= A Place to Call Home season 2 =

Season of Australian television series

A Place to Call Home
- Season 2
- Season 2 DVD and Revised Ending DVD
- No. of episodes: 10

Release
- Original network: Seven Network
- Original release: 11 May – 13 July 2014; 13 September 2015

Season chronology
- ← Previous; Season 1 Next → Season 3

The second season of the Seven Network television series A Place to Call Home premiered on 11 May 2014 and concluded on 13 July 2014.

== Production ==
On 15 July 2013, Channel Seven released an announcement which confirmed that A Place to Call Home had been commissioned for a second season, set to air in May 2014. Brad Lyons, the Director of Network Production at Seven stated, "A Place to Call Home has showcased drama on a scale never seen before on Australian television. It's pleasing to see such an ambitious production receive the acclaim it deserves."

Pre-production for season 2 began in August 2013. Filming for the second season began in September 2013 and wrapped in December 2013.

In June 2014, Glen Williams from TV Week reported that Channel Seven had passed on the option to renew the series and had recently told the cast and crew they would not be required for a third season. Due to this, the last episode of season two had to be hastily rewritten and filmed to accommodate the cancellation and tie up any loose storylines. However, on 25 October 2014, it was announced the show was to be revived by Foxtel for at least two more seasons. Due to the revival, the original ending was aired later to give the original lead-in to season three.

== Cast ==
=== Main ===
- Marta Dusseldorp as Sarah Adams
- Noni Hazlehurst as Elizabeth Bligh
- Brett Climo as George Bligh
- Craig Hall as Dr. Jack Duncan
- David Berry as James Bligh
- Abby Earl as Anna Bligh
- Arianwen Parkes-Lockwood as Olivia Bligh
- Aldo Mignone as Angelo "Gino" Poletti
- Sara Wiseman as Carolyn Bligh
- Matt Levett as Andrew Swanson
- Frankie J. Holden as Roy Briggs

=== Recurring ===
- Deborah Kennedy as Doris Collins
- Jenni Baird as Regina Standish
- Heather Mitchell as Prudence Swanson
- Amy Mathews as Amy Polson
- Jacinta Acevski as Alma Grey
- Dina Panozzo as Carla Poletti
- Ella Clark as Amo Poletti
- Ben Winspear as Dr. Rene Nordmann

=== Guest ===
- Siena Elchaar as Gilda Poletti
- Scott Grimley as Norman Parker
- Andrew McFarlane
- Jeff Truman as Father Joe
- Jason Montgomery as Adam Farrell
- Erica Lovell as Eve Walker
- Tristan Maxwell as Colin Walker
- Indi & Izzi Scott as Louise Walker
- Martin Sacks as Itzaak Gold
- Lisa Peers as Miriam Gold
- Michael Sheasby as Bert Ford
- Arianwen Parkes-Lockwood as Samantha
- Judi Farr as Peg Maloney
- Adam Gray-Hayward as Dr. Rene Nordmann

==== Casting ====
Amy Polson was originally played by Krew Boylan, however due to scheduling issues, the role is now played by Amy Mathews. Sara Wiseman and Matt Levett, who portray Carolyn Bligh and Andrew Swanson respectively, have both been promoted to the main cast. Jenni Baird and Deborah Kennedy, who portray Regina Standish and Doris Collins respectively, will both return for season two.

== Episodes ==
No. overall	No. in season	Title	Directed by	Written by	Original release date	Australian viewers (millions)
14	1	"No Secrets, Ever"	Mark Joffe	Trent Atkinson	11 May 2014	1,092,000
In 2013, an elderly Sarah relays the story of Bert's murder. Back in 1953, the trial periods for Anna and Sarah begin. Elizabeth announces a decision that shocks everyone. Olivia becomes increasingly worried about James' treatment. Carolyn returns to Ash Park. Jack is angry with Carolyn and promises to uncover his daughter's identity.
15	2	"I Believe"	Mark Joffe	Tony Morphett	18 May 2014	1,041,000
In the aftermath of Bert's death and its subsequent cover-up, those involved search for inner peace. But while Sarah battles her own demons, she is well aware that Colin's suffering is tenfold. James' treatment continues to cause him suffering and Jack is determined for answers after Carolyn's revelation.
16	3	"A Kiss to Build a Dream On"	Lynn-Maree Danzey	Rick Held	25 May 2014	1,159,000
Sarah reveals that, during her imprisonment in Ravensbrück, the officers repeatedly raped her. Olivia returns to Ash Park for Sarah and George's engagement party, bringing Andrew with her. After rejecting Andrew, Anna and Gino become engaged. Jack tries to grow closer to Anna. Dr Milsen continues torturing James and suggests a lobotomy.
17	4	"What Your Heart Says"	Lynn-Maree Danzey	Hamilton Budd	1 June 2014	1,213,000
After James is rescued from the hospital, his sexuality becomes known. Jack and Carolyn grow closer together through Anna. Sarah decides it is time to tell George the truth about her rape. Elizabeth and Anna go head-to-head when the former blames Carolyn for the latter's behaviour. Sarah informs Elizabeth she will be moving out for the Christmas period.
18	5	"The Ghosts of Christmas Past"	Lynn Hegarty	Brooke Wilson	8 June 2014	1,137,000
George tells Sarah that he will love her despite her secret. Elizabeth relives her romantic experience with Jack's father. Jack's intimacy issues come to light when Carolyn invites him to a party. Anna humiliates Andrew when she invites Gino to Christmas proceedings with her family. James and Olivia grow closer. Sarah leaves for the Christmas period.
19	6	"Auld Lang Syne"	Lynn Hegarty	Bevan Lee	15 June 2014	1,186,000
The family celebrate New Year's 1954. Sarah proves herself at a party designed by Elizabeth and Prudence to throw her in the deep end. Jack reveals the truth about his intimacy issue and sleeps with Carolyn. Anna and Gino sleep together in the Bligh mansion. Olivia discovers her unborn child has died and confides in Andrew. Regina returns from France with shocking news and discovers the truth about James.
20	7	"No Other Love"	Mark Joffe	Bevan Lee	22 June 2014	1,182,000
Regina informs Sarah that her husband is alive. Anna and Gino finalise their wedding details and disinvite Elizabeth. George and Sarah call off their engagement when she decides she needs to get her husband. Elizabeth realizes how big a mistake she has made. Regina threatens to blackmail Elizabeth with her knowledge of James' homosexuality. Andrew organises a pregnant, unwed mother to give her child to Olivia. Roy has trouble saying goodbye to Sarah.
21	8	"Answer Me, My Love"	Mark Joffe	Trent Atkinson	22 June 2014^{[a]}	1,150,000
Sarah arrives in Paris and moves in with René and his sister. George tells Elizabeth exactly what he thinks about her. Anna figures out that Jack is her biological father. Olivia and the mother of the child Andrew has organized both go into labour. James is (ignorantly) overjoyed by the birth of baby George. Regina and her hired driver, Adam, put a plan into action.
22	9	"I Do, I Do"	Lynn-Maree Danzey	Hamilton Budd	6 July 2014	1,210,000
Sarah returns to Inverness with René and moves in with Roy. Olivia believes that her child is not settling because of her deception and is further rattled when James delivers her an ultimatum - she chooses their marriage or Andrew. Anna and Gino's wedding day arrives and at the last minute, Elizabeth is forgiven by Anna and invited to the wedding. Elizabeth and Sarah mutually forgive each other. Regina has Adam bash her.
23a	10a	"Unforgettable"	Lynn-Maree Danzey	Bevan Lee & Kim Wilson	13 July 2014	1,302,000
Olivia tells Andrew they can no longer be friends and reassures James of her love for him. Anna and Gino's honeymoon is tainted when Andrew arrives with a letter revealing the truth about Olivia's child. George informs his family that he is leaving Ash Park, but after consideration, Elizabeth signs the estate over to her son. Regina attempts without success to become the mistress of the estate. Sarah informs René that she will always love him. Jack proposes to Carolyn. Elizabeth leaves Ash Park determined to discover who she really is. Note: This was the final episode aired on Channel Seven. Due to the cancellation of the series, the ending had to be reworked to act as a series finale.
23b	10b	"Unforgettable"	Lynn-Maree Danzey	Bevan Lee & Kim Wilson	13 September 2015	51,000
Anna's tainted honeymoon continues when she decides to read the letter Andrew delivers, and learns the truth about Olivia and James' son. Elizabeth decides to leave Ash Park, and does so after farewelling her family. George heads out on horseback, closely followed by Regina, when René heads out with a shotgun. Sarah emerges from the shower, to a gunshot, and finds a shocked René, a gun-wielding Regina and an unconscious George lying on the ground with a gunshot wound. Note: This was the first original episode to air on Foxtel. Due to the recommissioning of the series, this episode features the original cliffhanger ending, setting up the third season.

== Notes ==
- ^{a} "Answer Me, My Love" aired in Melbourne and Adelaide on 22 June 2014, and in Sydney, Brisbane and Perth on 29 June 2014.

== Home media ==
Title	Set details	Blu-ray and DVD release dates	Special features
Title	Set details	Region B/4	Special features
A Place to Call Home — Season 2	Discs: 3; Episodes: 10	17 July 2014	Interviews; Young to Old: Sarah's Transformation
A Place to Call Home — Season 2: Collector's Edition	Discs: 1; Episodes: 3	29 October 2015 (Note: Only released on DVD.)	
