= A Place to Call Home season 3 =

Season of Australian television series

A Place to Call Home
- Season 3
- No. of episodes: 10

Release
- Original network: SoHo
- Original release: 27 September – 29 November 2015

Season chronology
- ← Previous; Season 2 Next → Season 4

The third season of the Seven Network television series A Place to Call Home premiered on SoHo on 27 September 2015 and concluded on 29 November 2015. The series is produced by Chris Martin-Jones, and executive produced by Penny Win and Julie McGauran.

== Production ==
Helen Vnuk from TV Week confirmed that a third season had been commissioned in May 2014. However, one month later, the magazine reported that Channel Seven had passed on the option to renew the series and had recently told the cast and crew they would not be required for a third season.

On 15 October 2014, it was announced that Foxtel had finalised a deal with Channel Seven that would see third and fourth seasons written, using the outlines created by Bevan Lee, produced by Seven Productions, but aired on Foxtel.

On 25 October 2014, Amy Harris of The Daily Telegraph announced that A Place to Call Home had been officially renewed for another two seasons and would return in late 2015, airing on Foxtel channel SoHo. It was also announced that all the original cast and crew members would return. Production was scheduled to resume in March 2015 in Camden, the show's original filming location.

On 19 November 2014, it was announced that Bevan Lee had stepped down as the script producer and had hand-picked Susan Bower to take over. As well as a new script producer, a new writing team, consisting of David Hannam, Sarah Lambert, Giula Sandler and Katherine Thomson, was also hired.

The season has been written by Susan Bower, Katherine Thomson, Sarah Lambert, David Hannam, Giula Sandler, Deborah Parsons, Kim Wilson and John Ridley, and directed by Ian Watson, Shirley Barrett, Lynn-Maree Danzey and Chris Martin-Jones.

== Plot ==
In season three of A Place to Call Home: as Australia faces internal and external threats to its way of life so too do the people of Inverness, and previous alliances and relationships are tested. Sarah's dilemma, between her feelings for George and her duty to her husband René, is exacerbated by a heartbreaking secret. James and Olivia's relationship is under pressure when the true parentage of baby George is threatened with exposure. Elizabeth Bligh's decision to leave Ash Park to explore a life of her own proves more difficult than she thought. Anna and Gino face the difference between the fairytale romance and the reality of married life. Independent lovers Carolyn and Jack try to move closer to a commitment. Through it all, Regina's manipulative behaviour weaves an impenetrable web around George. In the sleepy village of Inverness, sex, death and secrets are never far below the surface.

== Cast ==
=== Main ===
- Marta Dusseldorp as Sarah Nordmann
- Noni Hazlehurst as Elizabeth Bligh
- Brett Climo as George Bligh
- Craig Hall as Dr. Jack Duncan
- David Berry as James Bligh
- Abby Earl as Anna Poletti
- Arianwen Parkes-Lockwood as Olivia Bligh
- Aldo Mignone as Gino Poletti
- Sara Wiseman as Carolyn Bligh
- Jenni Baird as Regina Bligh
- Frankie J. Holden as Roy Briggs

=== Recurring & Guest ===
- Deborah Kennedy as Doris Collins
- Brenna Harding as Rose O'Connell
- Mark Lee as Sir Richard Bennett
- Ben Winspear as René Nordmann
- Tim Draxl as Dr. Henry Fox
- Scott Grimley as Norman Parker
- Robert Coleby as Douglas Goddard
- Heather Mitchell as Prudence Swanson
- Rick Donald as Lloyd Ellis Parker
- Warwick Young as Sgt. Eddie Franklin
- Judi Farr as Peg Maloney

== Episodes ==
No. overall	No. in season	Title	Directed by	Written by	Original release date	Australian viewers (millions)
24	1	"The Things We Do for Love"	Ian Barry	David Hannam	27 September 2015	154,000
Because George is in critical condition after being shot, Sarah takes the risk of removing the bullet from his abdomen en route to the hospital. After surgery at the hospital, he awakens in his room and whispers Sarah's name, which Regina overhears. Anna is shocked to learn that baby George isn't James's and Olivia's child but is the baby of an unwed mother; she later tells Gino that James is a homosexual and is dismayed by his disgust. René is arrested for attempted murder, and Regina tells Sarah that if George dies, she'll make sure René hangs; however, he is released when Regina changes her story and says George stopped René from committing suicide. Olivia hires a new maid, Rose, who acts oddly around baby George. James quietly flirts with George's doctor, Henry Fox, over a cigarette. After dealing with the harrowing events of the past day, Sarah is shocked when she learns that she is pregnant with George's baby.
25	2	"L'Chaim, to Life"	Ian Barry	Giula Sandler	4 October 2015	154,000
George's return from hospital opens possibiliies for the Bligh family: His new lease on life prompts him to pursue a career in politics, and he announces that he'll run for the Country Party in the next election. Media baron Sir Richard Bennett supports his bid but also tells him that his chances would be better if he were to marry a suitable woman, with an aristocratic background. James and Olivia's decision to move forward the christening of baby George hits a snag when Gino, still disgusted by James's sexuality, declines becoming the godfather of his son. James assures Olivia that the scrutiny on their family during his father's campaign won't unearth any secrets and that he's committed to their marriage, and they make love. After learning that she's pregnant with George's baby and sharing the news with Jack, Sarah again remembers her past in Ravensbrück, where she was beaten by the Nazis while pregnant and lost the baby. After René has a health crisis, Sarah decides to go to the city and have an abortion.
26	3	"Somewhere Beyond the Sea"	Lynn-Maree Danzey	Katherine Thomson	11 October 2015	154,000
Elizabeth's new life in the city gets off to a great start when Douglas Goddard, a prominent man in Sydney and a friend of Prudence's, suggests that she volunteer in a refuge for men affected by the Second World War. Gino continues to barely hide his disgust for James; he also finally tells Anna that he wants to use his parents' farm to grow grapes and become a successful winemaker like the other men in his family. Lloyd Ellis Parker, an artist and friend of Carolyn's, arrives to paint the young Bligh family. George throws a party to celebrate his entrance into the ballot for the Country Party. On the night of the party, James and Dr Henry Fox grow closer, and Olivia and Lloyd share a passionate kiss. Sarah arrives in Sydney, ostensibly to look after Aunt Peg, who guesses that she's pregnant; although the latter is vehemently opposed to abortion, she later accepts that she has no idea what Sarah's going through, and she finds a name and number for Sarah. Sarah makes and keeps an appointment.
27	4	"Too Old to Dream"	Lynn-Maree Danzey	Deborah Parsons	18 October 2015	170,000
Anna and Gino's begin to establish the vineyard, but Anna worries that they won't survive the five or more years until the grapes can be harvested. Regina witnesses a moment of passion between James and Henry and decides to use it to her advantage. Elizabeth's feelings for Douglas grow as she continues to work at the Retired Veterans centre. Sir Richard offers Carolyn the job of arts critic at his Sydney newspaper, but Elizabeth worries that readers won't like or accept her views. Olivia panics when she finds Baby George's crib empty; shortly thereafter he's found in bed with Rose, the maid. Olivia later has a passionate dream about Lloyd, the artist. Sarah decides against having an abortion; as she flees, she drops an envelope with Aunt Peg's address, which the mother of another client picks up. When that client, a teen, falls ill from an incomplete abortion, the mother begs Sarah for help. Despite Sarah's and Jack's best efforts, the girl dies. Sarah tells René that she's pregnant with George's child.
28	5	"Living in the Shadow"	Shirley Barrett	Kim Wilson	25 October 2015	167,000
Carolyn takes up Sir Richard's offer of having her own column in the Sydney newspaper, and begins her new job with a controversial article about the woman with no female friends, an article written specifically about Regina. Douglas decides that life is too short and begins a series of romantic advances towards Elizabeth, which cause her to withdraw. Doris organises a day out for Inverness to meet George as the new Country Party candidate. Anna learns the truth about Olivia and Andrew's deception, which leads Olivia to seek solace in Lloyd's arms and ultimately begin an affair with him. Gino begins to realise how bad his money problems are and sells his father's pocket watch as a way to try and save his farm. Jack and Sarah travel to Sydney to track down the doctor, who is performing illegal abortions, in a bid to avenge the death of the young girl Jack couldn't save. After initial problems, René finally accepts Sarah's pregnancy, but the next morning on her way to work, Sarah begins cramping and collapses.
29	6	"In the Heat of the Night"	Shirley Barrett	Sarah Lambert	1 November 2015	174,000
After introducing Olivia to the world of oral sex, Lloyd's life is threatened when James uncovers the truth about his wife's level of intimacy with him and punches him. Learning that Henry is, in fact, gay and his partner died some time ago, James seeks solace in him. Carolyn's given a further opportunity by Sir Richard when he decides to keep her on as a writer, and she is later invited to one of his soirees, and takes a homosexual friend, Simon. Elizabeth makes a decision not to return to the soup kitchen, but after Douglas reveals his true feelings for her, she changes her mind and returns. Anna and Gino are caught in the middle of the Bligh family drama after Rose steals baby George, believing that he is the child that she lost at birth. She shows Olivia the birth certificate revealing that she too had a still birth. Sarah is placed into hospital with spotting, and is forced to tell George the truth - he's the father of her child. After the cramps stop and Sarah is given the all clear and taken home, René's illness takes a turn for the worse, and mistaking his wife for George, René strangles Sarah.
30	7	"The Sins of the Father"	Chris-Martin Jones	John Ridley	8 November 2015	198,000
George is haunted by the memory of his father's death and it is revealed that when George was 12, he found his father, Lewis, kissing another man, and when George confronted him over it, Lewis bashed him and rode away on his horse. He later found his father dead on a river bank, having been thrown from his horse, over a bridge - and believed it to be a suicide, until Elizabeth assured him that he was not to blame for Lewis' death. Regina suspects that James and Henry's relationship is more than platonic, and while spying on them, she pays Richard a visit who tells her to put her plan to get George into motion. Anna's decision making about buying a horse, and writing her book, puts Gino offside, straining their already fragile marriage. Sarah learns that René's ailment is worsening, and the only way to fix it is for him to have experimental brain surgery that could potentially kill him. Carolyn's new job at the newspaper puts her life in danger, when she invites Sir Richard over for drinks to propose a new story, and in an alcoholic rage, he brutally attacks and rapes her.
31	8	"Til Death Do Us Part"	Chris Martin-Jones	Giula Sandler	15 November 2015	178,000
René is admitted to hospital on the day of his surgery and tells Sarah that everything will be alright and after undergoing his potentially fatal brain operation, he awakens, but when he tries to get out of bed, he falls over and hits his head, causing a brain haemmorhage, which leads to his death. Carolyn reels in the wake of her rape and decides to confront Richard about it, but is soon disheartened when he tells her that no one would believe her because she's a woman. James returns to Inverness for baby George's christening, and decides to stay to keep up appearances, but he will stay in a separate room to Olivia. Gino discovers that all of his grape vines have died and when he reveals this to Anna, she also learns how in debt the young couple are. After taking Richard's advice on board, George proposes to Regina; however, when she learns that René has died and that Elizabeth knows that she cheated on her late husband, Charles, she suggests an impromptu wedding. As Sarah returns to Inverness with the body of her late husband, the wedding is well underway with George and Regina pronounced husband and wife, before taking their wedding photo.
32	9	"The Mourners' Kadish"	Lynn-Maree Danzey	Katherine Thomson	22 November 2015	169,000
Regina and George return to Ash Park from their wedding, where both Elizabeth and Carolyn warn both parties about their marriage of convenience. Sarah is flustered in her attempts to arrange René's funeral but Roy and Doris Collins offer their support. With her family in tatters, Elizabeth refuses Douglas' offer of a deeper friendship. Gino is upset when he finds and reads Anna's unpublished novel. As their romantic dream finally shatters, Anna returns to Ash Park. Regina takes extreme measures to further ensnare George.
33	10	"The Love Undeniable"	Lynn-Maree Danzey	David Hannam	29 November 2015	163,000
Elizabeth and Douglas' relationship grows to the point where he asks her on an overseas trip as more than friends, and to accept his offer, she just needs to meet him at Carolyn's apartment, but when he arrives, he's disappointed when she isn't there, ignorant to the fact that she has suffered a heart attack and is unconscious in the apartment. Anna and Gino make up and she reveals to him that she has received a book offer from Angus & Robertson, who want to publish her novel. James learns that baby George isn't his son, and in the heat of the moment, sleeps with Dr. Henry. Olivia, after learning of her husband's infidelity, packs her bags, takes her son and pursues a plight to find Lloyd. Jack learns that Carolyn was raped by Sir Richard, and is called into questioning by police after allegations are made that he is performing backyard abortions. George learns that Sarah considered having an abortion, and he reveals that he loves her, and that, when she is ready, he will divorce Regina to be with her. After learning that George is still in love with Sarah, Regina poisons Sarah's tonic with rat poison.

=== Ratings ===
No.	Title	Air date	Viewers	Rank
1	"The Things We Do for Love"	27 September 2015	154,000	2
2	"L'Chaim, to Life"	4 October 2015	154,000	2
3	"Somewhere Beyond the Sea"	11 October 2015	154,000	4
4	"Too Old to Dream"	18 October 2015	170,000	1
5	"Living in the Shadow"	25 October 2015	167,000	1
6	"In the Heat of the Night"	1 November 2015	174,000	2
7	"The Sins of the Father"	8 November 2015	198,000	1
8	"Til Death Do Us Part"	15 November 2015	178,000	1
9	"The Mourners' Kadish"	22 November 2015	169,000	1
10	"The Love Undeniable"	29 November 2015	163,000	1
