= A Place to Call Home season 4 =

Season of Australian television series

A Place to Call Home
- Season 4
- No. of episodes: 12

Release
- Original network: Showcase
- Original release: 11 September – 27 November 2016

Season chronology
- ← Previous; Season 3 Next → Season 5

The fourth season of the Seven Network television series A Place to Call Home premiered on Showcase on 11 September 2016. The series was produced by Chris Martin-Jones, and executive produced by Penny Win and Julie McGauran.

== Production ==
On 15 October 2014, it was announced that Foxtel had finalised a deal with Channel Seven that would see third and fourth seasons written, using the outlines created by Bevan Lee, produced by Seven Productions, but aired on Foxtel.

On 25 October 2014, Amy Harris of The Daily Telegraph announced that A Place to Call Home had been officially renewed for another two seasons and would return in late 2015, airing on Foxtel channel SoHo. It was also announced that all the original cast and crew members would return.

Production on the fourth season began on 29 February 2016 and concluded on 5 August 2016. The episode order was extended from the usual 10 episodes to 12, with Foxtel's Director of Television, Brian Walsh stating, "we have extended the commission order to 12 episodes this year because the storylines are so strong".

Having departed the series at the end of the second season, Bevan Lee returned to helm this year as Script Executive, with Katherine Thomson taking over from Susan Bower as Script Producer. Shirley Barrett, Kriv Stenders, Catherine Millar and Tony Krawitz serve as directors for this season.

Of the show's return, Foxtel's Head of Drama, Penny Win stated, "Working with Seven Productions on A Place to Call Home's has resulted in fantastic achievements for the series. With record breaking audiences for the SoHo channel, the passionate and dedicated fans and the growing audience around the world, the show is a testament to Foxtel's commitment to great Australian storytelling." Seven's Head of Drama, Julie McGauran stated, "A Place to Call Home has been a hugely successful collaboration between Seven Productions and Foxtel. Together we’ve been able to engineer a wonderful partnership for everyone, especially the fans, who have so much to look forward to in season 4."

The series was also planned to air on Showcase, after SoHo was closed by Foxtel.

== Plot ==
In this season, the characters are strongly affected by two contrasting social issues in 1954. The first is the conservative wave of fear generated by the "Reds Under the Beds" scare surrounding the Petrov Affair. The second, the wave of liberal change that opened up new social and moral choices for Australians at the time.

== Cast ==
=== Main ===
- Marta Dusseldorp as Sarah Nordmann
- Noni Hazlehurst as Elizabeth Bligh
- Brett Climo as George Bligh
- Craig Hall as Dr. Jack Duncan
- David Berry as James Bligh
- Abby Earl as Anna Poletti
- Arianwen Parkes-Lockwood as Olivia Bligh
- Aldo Mignone as Gino Poletti
- Sara Wiseman as Carolyn Duncan
- Jenni Baird as Regina Bligh
- Frankie J. Holden as Roy Briggs

=== Recurring & Guest ===
- Deborah Kennedy as Doris Collins
- Brenna Harding as Rose O'Connell
- Heather Mitchell as Prudence Swanson
- Mark Lee as Sir Richard Bennett
- Tim Draxl as Dr. Henry Fox
- Dominic Allburn as Harry Polson
- Rohan Nichol as Sergeant Brian Taylor
- Rick Donald as Lloyd Ellis Parker
- Robert Coleby as Douglas Goddard
- Leigh Scully as Gordon Walsh
- Alan Dearth as Robert Menzies

== Episodes ==
No. overall	No. in season	Title	Directed by	Written by	Original release date	Australian viewers (millions)
34	1	"A Nagging Doubt"	Shirley Barrett	Bevan Lee	11 September 2016	101,000
Sarah's suspicions are aroused when she realises that the death of the local teacher, Milly Davis, may not have been a suicide as first suspected. Regina's guilt weighs heavily on her conscience when it becomes apparent that the tonic she poisoned with rat bait, originally meant for Sarah, was given to Milly instead. James and Olivia's sham marriage falls further into disarray when she learns that although they aren't George's biological parents, the courts will still favour the Bligh family in a custody battle. Elizabeth offers James and Henry her blessing to pursue a relationship together, and assures her grandson that she isn't disgusted by him. Anna is rejected by a publisher in Sydney due to the content of her novel, however is given some hope when Elizabeth suggests she talk to Richard. Carolyn is forced into giving Richard information about James and Olivia's failing union when he threatens to rape her again. Regina begins to drive a wedge between Anna and Gino when she sends Rose for Italian lessons. Sarah confronts Regina and asks her what it is like to be a murderer when she realises the truth behind Milly's death.
35	2	"Bad in a Good Way"	Shirley Barrett	Bevan Lee	18 September 2016	156,000
Olivia confirms to James that she was carrying a stillborn child, and due to this, she went through with an illegal adoption to obtain baby George. She then agrees to continue to forge a united force with her husband in order to help George win the election, and promises Lloyd that she will wait for him. Anna's growing desire to have her writing published leads her into the hands of Sir Richard, who flirts with her, but assures her that she is a good writer, with thoughts far more futuristic than the times. Sarah's accusation of Regina as a murderer comes back to haunt her when Sgt Brian Taylor threatens her and investigates her as a potential Communist during a critical time in Australia's political history, the Red Scare. Carolyn's rape continues as a catalyst for her romantic closure, however to prove her love to Jack, she agrees to set a date for the wedding. James grows uncomfortable around Henry after a day at the beach provides James an insight into the hidden realm of homosexuality, revealing some interesting personalities. Brian questions Sarah over the disappearance of Bert Ford.
36	3	"When You're Smiling"	Kriv Stenders	Bevan Lee	25 September 2016	136,000
After various complaints from parents, Sarah is asked not to continue teaching at the local school. Concerned about the murder of Bert Ford, she and Roy visit Eve, but find that the police beat them to it. Sarah finds Eve's brother Harry in a hospital, after being beaten up for his sexuality, and decides to take him back to Inverness. Elizabeth considers voting against George in the election in an effort to be rid of Regina. Henry and James attend a movie in the company of a lesbian couple, to keep up appearances, and declare their love for one another afterwards. While Anna considers the plot for her next novel, Olivia returns to Ash Park for the Prime Minister's arrival and sleeps in the groundsman's cottage. Amongst dinner preparations, Regina is visited by Gino, who hopes to dispel rumours of an affair between him and Rose. She is shocked to hear that George has invited Anna and Gino, though the latter later declines. Carolyn refuses to attend the dinner in order to avoid Sir Richard, which leads to her telling the truth to Elizabeth about her rape. Mrs Collins and Jack discover that Sergeant Taylor is using their petition for Sarah as a list of communist sympathisers. Elizabeth sets off for Ash Park, keen to use the dinner with Menzies as a chance to humiliate Regina.
37	4	"Home to Roost"	Kriv Stenders	Bevan Lee	2 October 2016	126,000
Regina's anxiety of the arrival of Sir Robert Menzies causes issues between her and Anna which flares and results in Regina slapping Anna across the face. George's wound from his shooting begins to cause him pain, which leads Regina to talking him into taking morphine, which in turn leads to Regina abusing the substance. Elizabeth arrives at Ash Park and humiliates Regina during dinner with the Menzieses and after the meal, she confronts and stabs Richard's hand in retaliation to her discovery of Carolyn's rape. Sarah confides in Roy that Harry is a homosexual, and to her surprise, he accepts him on the proviso that he doesn't flirt with him. In a drugged stupor, Regina attempts to smother Elizabeth. Elizabeth apologises to Carolyn for the way that she has treated her over the years. George calls a family meeting in which he announces that Elizabeth, Carolyn and Olivia will move back into the mansion, whilst Regina is banished to the cottage. He then announces that he is the father of Sarah's unborn child and afterwards, he finds Sarah and tells her that they need to talk.
38	5	"Happy Days Are Here Again"	Catherine Millar	Bevan Lee	9 October 2016	136,000
Anna's attempts to use Jack and Carolyn's story as the major plotline of her novel are quashed when they ask her not to dredge up the past for the sake of their upcoming nuptials, which leads Elizabeth, Sarah and Anna to formulate a plan to destroy Regina - Anna shall pen a novel about a librarian who is poisoned, in hope that Regina's reputation will be ruined beyond repair. Gino tells James that although James is going against the teachings of the bible and what he is doing is wrong, he will be polite to him for Anna's sake. Carolyn receives a wreath in the mail with a note which reads 'RIP' and accuses Richard after it is revealed he has donated 5000 to the Inverness hospital for a surgical wing. Regina disappears from Ash Park only to confront Sir Richard, who tells her to go back and play happy family with George and to twist him around her finger. Olivia and Henry forge a friendship. James finally professes his love for Henry. Harry's arrival at Roy's farmstead is marred when he runs into James, who doesn't remember him due to his electroconvulsive therapy.
39	6	"The Trouble with Harry"	Catherine Millar	Bevan Lee	16 October 2016	142,000
James is delighted when Elizabeth and Olivia encourage him to go spend three days in the city with Henry. However, when he does, he begins to dream of, and remember, Harry. Elizabeth worries that she and Sarah will fall out after she and George learn of Harry's presence in town. Olivia attempts to banish Harry from Inverness, but after second thoughts, she apologises. Jack and his attorney meet with the police investigators and they drop the case, but Jack learns that Sir Richard paid for the lawyer he thought the Blighs had paid. Gino and Anna discuss their upcoming trip to Italy, and he and Carolyn try to encourage Anna to have children. Regina and Brian go to the city and have lunch with Gordon, Milly's fiancée and inform him that nothing will happen to Sarah if he doesn't do something about her. Olivia receives correspondence from Lloyd and learns that he has safely made it to London. Doris Collins talks Harry into staying in Inverness after he tries to leave without saying goodbye to Roy and Sarah. Elizabeth is overjoyed to find Douglas Goddard in her living room, playing the piano.
40	7	"You're Just in Love"	Shirley Barrett	Bevan Lee	23 October 2016	149,000
News of George's electoral win spreads around Inverness as the Country Party member. Gordon's presence becomes apparent when Harry sees him following Sarah and informs Roy. When Gordon prepares to shoot Sarah, he learns she is pregnant and tells Brian that when she has given birth, he will come back and kill her. Anna realises that she is just as much as liar as the rest of her family when she reveals to Carolyn that she may not be able to have a baby, and that Rose may be a better match for Gino, since she can give him children. Regina's banished from the wedding, and concurrently, she seduces Brian and they have sex in a room at the Australia Hotel. George finally learns of James and Henry's relationship, and eventually gives his blessing. Elizabeth and Douglas grow closer. Carolyn and Jack's wedding goes ahead without a hitch and they are pronounced husband and wife. Harry turns up at the wedding reception and James notices him. After the reception, James has flashbacks to his electro-convulsive therapy and conversion therapy and realises that he was once in love with Harry Polson.
41	8	"There'll Be Some Changes Made"	Shirley Barrett	Katherine Thomson	30 October 2016	150,000
Jack and Douglas take matters with Sir Richard into their own hands when the refuge comes under threat, Sir Richard begins to pick off Douglas's sponsors for the refuge. As Jack's plan to avenge Carolyn reaches its climax Carolyn begs him not to go ahead with the plan to which Jack decides he must do what he knows is right. James grapples with his old feelings for Harry. Sarah and Elizabeth support Doris through matters of the heart after she mistakenly believes Roy is interested in her. Sarah and George talk about his future in political life and she warns him about how dangerous Regina truly is. They then talk about how George will be able to react following the birth of the baby, Sarah requests that he does not rush back to Inverness when the baby is born. This causes tension between Sarah and George, but George soon decides that Sarah's plan must be followed if suspicion is not to be aroused. Meanwhile, Sarah and Roy go for dinner at Dawn's house where Roy begins to grow even closer to Dawn with Sarah's help.
42	9	"Where Will the Baby's Dimple Be"	Tony Krawitz	Katherine Thomson	6 November 2016	135,000
Sarah goes into a long and difficult labour. James supports Olivia when she heartbreakingly learns that her plans to leave Ash Park and start a life with Lloyd are dashed. Elizabeth gets a wonderful surprise. Sarah gives birth to a baby boy but he struggles to breathe leaving him in a critical condition. George's arrival at the hospital to see Sarah and their newborn ends on shaky grounds after Sarah asserts that the child will take the surname of Nordmann instead of Bligh and raise him on her own. This angers George who contemplates whether he and Sarah should go their separate ways. Roy tries to provide Sarah some comfort amongst the chaos. Meanwhile, Regina goes for a short trip to Sydney where she invites Sergeant Taylor to her apartment and they have passionate sex. She later sends a telegram to Milly Davis's fiancé who plans to kill Sarah after her baby is born to inform him the baby is born and the way forward is clear.
43	10	"And the Blind Shall See"	Tony Krawitz	Bevan Lee	13 November 2016	128,000
Anna and Gino arrive from Italy to learn that Anna is unable to conceive children. Sarah and Anna's plan to destroy Regina pushes Gino to his limit and he explodes at Anna expressing his disgust to Anna at the Bligh family secrets. Olivia is in a depressive state following the massive disappointment that her dream to start a new life with Lloyd in London is no longer. Roy and Sarah discuss his commitment issues. Elizabeth executes Operation Vanquish Regina when Anna completes the manuscript that reveals Regina's darkest secrets and the murder of Milly Davis. Rose overhears Anna and Carolyn discussing Regina and becomes suspicious that the family is planning something against Regina. Jack shows George the birth certificate of Sarah and his newborn son and is delighted that she has named him "David Bligh", thus securing the Bligh estate for another generation and hinting at the blossoming of a renewed relationship between them.
44	11	"Catch the Tiger"	Catherine Millar	Katherine Thomson	20 November 2016	132,000
The tension between James and Henry escalates after James invites Harry to an unconventional party. Regina continues her affair with Sergeant Taylor. Milly Davis's fiancé continues his discreet investigation of Sarah to avenge his fiancée's suicide-murder, and realises he has been played by Regina who wants Sarah dead. Regina is confronted by Sergeant Brian Taylor who has become suspicious of Regina's motives to frame Sarah for the murder-suicide. He threatens to leave her, causing Regina to reach breaking point and shoot the Sergeant through the head. A desperate Regina sneaks back to the Bligh Mansion having attempted to frame the Sergeant's death as a suicide then narrowly escapes with her future uncertain. Meanwhile, Anna and Gino struggle to overcome the news that Anna will be unable to conceive children. Anna proposes to annul the marriage on the basis that she knew of her infertility before marrying Gino and did not tell him. Gino is extremely angered that Anna lied to him leaving their marriage on the rocks and the possibility of annulment more possible.
45	12	"All Good Things"	Catherine Millar	Bevan Lee	27 November 2016	173,000
After escaping the doctors, Regina ends up at Sarah's house. Elizabeth's irritation over Rose helping Regina causes a rift between herself and Douglas. Worried about Sarah, George heads to her home. When Regina threatens to harm baby David, Sarah holds her at gunpoint but is convinced by George and Roy not to shoot. Sarah thumps Regina hard in the stomach, and Regina is taken away by doctors. Olivia and James agree to act like a couple to fend off suspicions during Regina's murder trials. Anna and Gino's marriage is in shambles. Gino convinces Rose of Regina's terrible acts, causing them to decide to leave together over the Blighs' deceptions. Anna decides that her inability to have children makes her incompatible with Gino and will cause them to hate each other, and goes to the city. Gino puts the Poletti farm for sale and leaves to start a new life elsewhere with Rose. Anna and Olivia discuss their failed marriages and conclude they were too young to understand the reality of married life. Olivia tells Anna that she sees her as a successful writer more than anything. Doris stumbles upon Sergeant Taylor's corpse. Two months later, at the marriage of Elizabeth and Douglas, Sarah and George appear together as a couple along with baby David. Anna is encouraged by Jack to say farewell to Gino, but she breaks down when she finds the farm empty and Gino and Rose gone. Milly Davis's fiancé agrees to testify at trial against Regina, and the Blighs agree to provide statements for Regina's actions. In the mental asylum, Regina hallucinates reconciling with George and getting revenge on Sarah. Richard and his lawyer discuss how to acquit Regina without sullying George's image, which would hurt Richard's business and political interests. Richard's lawyer suggests portraying Regina's crimes as the result of George's supposed infidelity. Sarah and Elizabeth toast each other as friends, and Sarah, George and David walk the grounds of Ash Park as a family.

=== Ratings ===
No.	Title	Air date	Viewers	Rank
1	"A Nagging Doubt"	11 September 2016	101,000	5
2	"Bad in a Good Way"	18 September 2016	156,000	2
3	"When You're Smiling"	25 September 2016	136,000	1
4	"Home to Roost"	2 October 2016	126,000	2
5	"Happy Days Are Here Again"	9 October 2016	136,000	8
6	"The Trouble with Harry"	16 October 2016	142,000	1
7	"You're Just in Love"	23 October 2016	149,000	2
8	"There'll Be Some Changes Made"	30 October 2016	150,000	1
9	"Where Will the Baby's Dimple Be"	6 November 2016	135,000	1
10	"And the Blind Shall See"	13 November 2016	128,000	1
11	"Catch the Tiger"	20 November 2016	132,000	1
12	"All Good Things"	27 November 2016	173,000	1
