= A Place to Call Home season 5 =

Season of Australian television series

A Place to Call Home
- Season 5
- No. of episodes: 12

Release
- Original network: Showcase
- Original release: 8 October – 24 December 2017

Season chronology
- ← Previous; Season 4 Next → Season 6

The fifth season of the Seven Network television series A Place to Call Home premiered on Showcase on 8 October 2017. The series was produced by Chris Martin-Jones, and executive produced by Penny Win and Julie McGauran.

== Production ==
On 16 November 2016, Foxtel announced that A Place to Call Home had been renewed for a fifth season. Of the renewal, Foxtel CEO, Peter Tonagh stated "[The show] goes way beyond just being a piece of content that appears on the screen. It’s a passion for hundreds of thousands of people who watch it every week."

Production on the fifth season began in February 2017.

Of the show's return, Foxtel's Head of Drama, Penny Win stated, "A Place to Call Home has continued to build very strong audiences and passionate fans throughout its time on Foxtel. We are thrilled with the success of the series both here and around the world, and series five promises to be more of what our audience loves. The incredible cast, whose performances are exemplary, and the creative team, led by Julie McGauran and Chris Martin-Jones, have brought Foxtel a wonderful piece of dramatic television that we are all very proud of." Seven's Head of Drama, Julie McGauran stated, "All of us at Seven Productions are delighted to continue the hugely successful collaboration with Foxtel on A Place To Call Home. This series is testament to how great storytelling, the talents of a truly gifted cast and a superb production can align to create extraordinary television and Seven are proud to be a part of an industry here in Australia that continues to deliver world class drama."

== Plot ==
Season five jumps forward four years to 1958 and looks at the changes in Australian society during that period, as cultural norms fall away, morals change, and the younger generation rejects the values of their elders and the continued focus on the War years. Ash Park faces turmoil as old friendships and rivalries reverse themselves, raising the question of what home means.

== Cast ==
=== Main ===
- Marta Dusseldorp as Sarah Nordmann
- Noni Hazlehurst as Elizabeth Goddard
- Brett Climo as George Bligh
- Craig Hall as Dr. Jack Duncan
- David Berry as James Bligh (Note: David Berry only appears in "The Anatomy of His Passing" and "In Memoriam", however he is credited among the main cast.)
- Abby Earl as Anna Bligh
- Arianwen Parkes-Lockwood as Olivia Bligh (Note: Arianwen Parkes-Lockwood is not credited in "Own Worst Enemy" through "Demons of the Dark" and she does not appear.)
- Sara Wiseman as Carolyn Duncan
- Jenni Baird as Regina Bligh
- Tim Draxl as Dr. Henry Fox
- Deborah Kennedy as Doris Collins
- Frankie J. Holden as Roy Briggs

=== Recurring & Guest ===
- Elliot Domoney as David Bligh
- Martin Sacks as Isaac Gold
- Madeleine Clunies-Ross as Leah Gold
- Heather Mitchell as Prudence Swanson
- Mark Lee as Sir Richard Bennett
- Robert Coleby as Douglas Goddard
- Conrad Coleby as Matthew Goddard
- Clodagh Crowe as Dawn Briggs
- George Pullar as Larry Forbes
- Aaron Pedersen as Frank Gibbs
- Matt Day as Ed Jarvis

== Episodes ==
No. overall	No. in season	Title	Directed by	Written by	Original release date	Australian viewers (millions)
46	1	"Own Worst Enemy"	Kevin Carlin	Bevan Lee	8 October 2017	163,000
ANZAC Day, 1958. Sarah and Henry clash when an Aboriginal patient named Frank Gibbs brings out the hidden prejudice in society. Elizabeth's life in the city is turned upside down when Douglas begins coughing up blood. Anna finally accepts her divorce from Gino by refusing to let their story influence her next book. George visits Regina in the mental asylum and is offered a divorce. Leah, a local Jewish teenager, runs away with her non-Jewish boyfriend, Larry. Henry takes his frustration of James' absence on others. Jack realises that Carolyn is missing life in the city.
47	2	"Fallout"	Kevin Carlin	Katherine Thomson	15 October 2017	105,000
Anna decides to move back to Ash Park to write her second novel. George concedes defeat and allows Sarah to bring David up in the Jewish faith. Douglas is diagnosed with lung cancer and decides to have the diseased lung removed. Isaac allows Leah to stay in Inverness while he moves to Israel. Carolyn's attempts to help Frank cause a rift between the pair. Jack contemplates hitting the bottle after a fight with Carolyn. Henry prepares to perform a double mastectomy on Sheila, a breast cancer patient. Richard urges George to get a divorce. Regina is released from the mental asylum after three months pass.
48	3	"All That Glitters"	Mark Joffe	John Lonie	22 October 2017	93,000
Frank politely declines Carolyn's advances to help him pursue a career in art. Elizabeth worries for Douglas' health as he seems to forget his pneumonectomy. Prudence returns to Ash Park, having gained her driving licence. George seeks guidance about converting to the Jewish faith. Leah is shocked when Larry gives her a condom as a house-warming present. Anna introduces her family to Ed, her publisher and announces she's finished her second book, All That Glitters. Jack's reluctance to change is clocked by Carolyn. Henry and Sarah look after Sheila when she is abused by her husband. Regina returns to Inverness after being released.
49	4	"The Edge of Reason"	Mark Joffe	David Hannam	29 October 2017	91,000
Anna decides to reject Ed's marriage proposal and revert their relationship to one of complete professionalism. Sarah threatens Regina's life, before agreeing to go to Canberra with George. Carolyn's rape by Sir Richard Bennett is revealed to George in a letter from Regina. Elizabeth learns that Douglas' cancer has returned after he begins coughing blood again. Larry and his friends harass Regina by throwing bottles at her house and hanging a baby doll on her verandah. Jack and Douglas propose a programme to Frank to help Aboriginal men who served in the war. Regina informs Sir Richard that she is back in Inverness, as per their plan.
50	5	"Do Not Go Gently"	Catherine Miller	Kristen Dunphy	5 November 2017	88,000
Frank loses his paintings and his home after sadistic local football coach, Stan O'Rourke burns his house down. Regina attempts to stop George and Sarah walking into Sir Richard's web in Canberra. Jack and Henry clash over whether to tell Douglas his diagnosis, against Elizabeth's wishes. After Elizabeth disapproves her novel, Anna attempts to have it edited, but Ed refuses. Elizabeth breaks the news to Douglas that he is dying. In Canberra, the Prime Minister berates George for bringing Sarah and then, Sarah suffers a panic attack when she sees a former guard from Ravensbrück.
51	6	"Demons of the Dark"	Catherine Millar	John Lonie	12 November 2017	110,000
Douglas researches the feasibility of euthanasia, despite Jack and Henry's advice. Regina's warnings fall upon deaf ears, except Anna's. Sir Richard attempts to rape Anna, however she defends herself and he falls down a flight of stairs. Frank, Roy and Jack bond with Larry when they convince him to help rebuild Frank's house. Sarah confronts the former guard from her concentration camp, and restrains herself instead of killing her. Carolyn reveals the truth about her rape to Anna. Jack threatens Stan O'Rourke. Elizabeth begs God to forgive any sins that Douglas may commit.
52	7	"The Anatomy of His Passing"	Jeremy Sims	David Hannam	19 November 2017	101,000
One month later, on Victory over Japan Day 1958, Douglas makes the decision to end his life and much to his chagrin, Elizabeth helps him. Henry launches an investigation into Douglas' death. Olivia returns from England with news that James has fallen back in love with her brother, William and is staying with him in the French Riviera. George learns that Sir Richard has the ability to seize Ash Park if he so desires. Elizabeth leaves Ash Park for the Swanson house in Sydney. Regina admits to Sarah that she is the person responsible for shooting George all those years ago. Roy learns that Dawn is pregnant.
53	8	"Cloud Break"	Jeremy Sims	Katherine Thomson	26 November 2017	98,000
Elizabeth's happiness in the city is soon replaced by shock when she learns that Douglas has named his supposedly deceased son Matthew in his will. Regina continues to string Sir Richard along, this time warning Henry of his capabilities. George questions whether he should sell off some land to repay his debts. Carolyn's obscure cake is a hit at the hospital fête, with Doris inviting her to join the CWA. Anna and Olivia's night of fun becomes a learning experience for both of them, as Anna surrounds herself with drugs and Olivia realises it is time to move on. Sarah and George must place their faith in Regina when coming up with an idea to stop Sir Richard once and for all.
54	9	"All That Lies Ahead"	Mark Joffe	Cathryn Strickland	3 December 2017	107,000
Jack decides to run for parliament as an independent after much consideration. Elizabeth welcomes Matthew into the family, as he asks Olivia to dinner. Sarah questions whether Regina's motives are genuine. Regina signs the divorce papers. Sir Richard pays Elizabeth a visit, to pay his respects after Douglas' passing. News of Dawn's pregnancy begin to spread. Henry and Jack learn that the latter's medical records have been requested by the Board. Carolyn learns the truth of Jack's addiction to pills. Three months later, Jack is seen stumbling through a paddock, drunk.
55	10	"Death Comes as an End"	Mark Joffe	Bevan Lee	10 December 2017	122,000
As the election day nears, Sir Richard begins to question whether a subterfuge is underway. Jack's chances of winning the election look certain until Sir Richard reveals Jack's torture in the war to the voters, resulting in him hitting the bottle. Elizabeth opens a Veteran's fund for Aboriginals who fought in the war. Anna and Henry get engaged to stop Sir Richard ruining his life. George rids himself of his debt after revealing his intent to wed Sarah. Regina's deception of Sir Richard is revealed in spectacular fashion and the morning of the election, her lifeless body is found in the river.
56	11	"Lie Deep"	Catherine Millar	Katherine Thomson	17 December 2017	100,000
Jack is found by Roy, intoxicated, still struggling with his public humiliation. After Regina's body is found, Henry and Sarah perform an autopsy and learn that she was dead before she went into the water. Elizabeth urges George to reconcile with James. Anna and Henry's drunken night of fun turns passionate when the two have sex. Matthew proposes to Olivia, and she accepts. Both George and Jack lose the election to the Labor candidate. Valda, the nurse Sir Richard was blackmailing, confesses to police that she stole morphine on his behalf, and he is arrested for Regina's murder.
57	12	"In Memoriam"	Catherine Millar	Bevan Lee	24 December 2017	66,000
Anna's world is shattered when Henry refuses to marry her after learning she cannot conceive children. Olivia and Matthew prepare to move overseas. Sir Richard is vindicated when Sarah learns that Regina killed herself to frame him and rid him from the lives of the Blighs forever. Elizabeth confronts Sir Richard one final time, armed with the fruit knife she attacked him with and forces him out of their lives. Jack reclaims his dignity after he confronts Stan O'Rourke. Sarah, George and David visit the French Riviera, where George makes amends with James, before heading to Israel.

=== Ratings ===
No.	Title	Air date	Viewers	Rank
1	"Own Worst Enemy"	8 October 2017	163,000	8
2	"Fallout"	15 October 2017	105,000	1
3	"All That Glitters"	22 October 2017	93,000	7
4	"The Edge of Reason"	29 October 2017	91,000	1
5	"Do Not Go Gently"	5 November 2017	88,000	6
6	"Demons of the Dark"	12 November 2017	110,000	1
7	"The Anatomy of His Passing"	19 November 2017	101,000	1
8	"Cloud Break"	26 November 2017	98,000	10
9	"All That Lies Ahead"	3 December 2017	107,000	1
10	"Death Comes as an End"	10 December 2017	122,000	1
11	"Lie Deep"	17 December 2017	100,000	1
12	"In Memoriam"	24 December 2017	66,000	1
