= A Place to Call Home season 1 =

Season of Australian television series

A Place to Call Home
- Season 1
- DVD cover art
- No. of episodes: 13

Release
- Original network: Seven Network
- Original release: 28 April – 21 July 2013

Season chronology
- Next → Season 2

The first season of the Seven Network television series A Place to Call Home, consisting of 13 episodes, premiered on 28 April 2013 and concluded on 21 July 2013.

== Production ==
A Place to Call Home was announced in Channel Seven's 2012 line-up. Seven Network's Angus Ross said that it would potentially premiere in late 2012 but wouldn't rush the show to air by a certain date unless "casting and other elements" were right.

== Plot ==
Set in Australia in the 1950s, A Place to Call Home is a compelling and romantic story of one woman's journey to heal her soul and of a privileged family rocked by scandal. Acclaimed actress Marta Dusseldorp leads the cast as Sarah Adams, a woman with a mysterious past who returns to Australia after 20 years in Europe.

Working her passage home aboard an ocean liner, Sarah becomes involved in the lives of the Blighs, a wealthy Australian pastoralist family. She develops an immediate connection with handsome and charming widower George (Brett Climo), as well as his modern young daughter Anna (Abby Earl) and withdrawn daughter-in-law Olivia (Arianwen Parkes-Lockwood). But it is when Sarah unwittingly discovers a potentially scandalous Bligh family secret that her future becomes forever linked with theirs.

Only the matriarch of the family, Elizabeth (Noni Hazlehurst), and her grandson James (David Berry) are aware that Sarah has uncovered this secret. Elizabeth seeks to conceal the truth and keep Sarah at a distance. Having been affected by the war and facing the animosity of a determined matriarch, Sarah begins to adjust her life and seek a sense of belonging.

== Cast ==
=== Main ===
- Marta Dusseldorp as Sarah Adams
- Noni Hazlehurst as Elizabeth Bligh
- Brett Climo as George Bligh
- Craig Hall as Dr. Jack Duncan
- David Berry as James Bligh
- Abby Earl as Anna Bligh
- Arianwen Parkes-Lockwood as Olivia Bligh
- Aldo Mignone as Gino Poletti (Note: Aldo Mignone is credited in "New Beginning" though he does not appear.)
- Frankie J. Holden as Roy Briggs (Note: Frankie J. Holden is credited in "Cane Toad", "True to Your Heart" and "Secret Love" though he does not appear.)

=== Recurring ===
- Deborah Kennedy as Doris Collins
- Krew Boylan as Amy Polson
- Michael Sheasby as Bert Ford
- Dominic Allburn as Harry Polson
- Jacinta Acevski as Alma Grey
- Dina Panozzo as Carla Poletti
- Sara Wiseman as Carolyn Bligh
- Jenni Baird as Regina Standish
- Tristan Maxwell as Colin Walker
- Angelo D'Angelo as Amo Poletti
- Judi Farr as Peg Maloney
- Lisa Peers as Miriam Goldberg
- Kris McQuade as Grace Stevens

=== Guest ===
- Scott Grimley as Norman Parker
- Paul Holmes as Reverend Green
- Erica Lovell as Eve Walker
- Adam Gray as Dr. René Nordmann
- Heather Mitchell as Prudence Swanson
- Nicole Shostak as Maude Carvolth
- Jeremy Lewis Hubbard as Clem
- Avital Greenberg-Teplitsky as Leah Goldberg
- Sean Taylor as Henry Swanson
- Matt Levett as Andrew Swanson
- Siena Elchaar as Gilda Poletti
- Martin Sacks as Itzaak Goldberg
- Russell Queay as William Brackley
- Alan Dearth as Robert Menzies

==== Casting ====
On 28 June 2012, it was reported that Noni Hazelhurst had been secured in a lead role as Elizabeth Bligh. A week later, on July 8, it was announced that Marta Dusseldorp and Brett Climo had joined Hazelhurst in the lead roles of Sarah Adams and George Bligh, respectively. Frankie J. Holden, David Berry, Arianwen Parkes-Lockwood, Craig Hall, Abby Earl and Aldo Mignone were announced the following day, completing the main cast.

== Episodes ==
No. overall	No. in season	Title	Directed by	Written by	Original release date	Australian viewers (millions)
1	1	"The Prodigal Daughter"	Roger Hodgman	Trent Atkinson and Bevan Lee	28 April 2013	1,930,000
Working her passage home aboard an ocean liner, Sarah becomes involved in the lives of the Blighs, a wealthy Australian pastoralist family. She develops an immediate connection with handsome and charming widower George, as well as his modern young daughter Anna and withdrawn daughter-in-law Olivia. But it is when Sarah unwittingly discovers a potentially scandalous Bligh family secret that her future becomes forever linked with theirs.
2	2	"The Welcome Mat"	Lynn-Maree Danzey	Trent Atkinson	5 May 2013	1,539,000
Warned by George about Doris' gossiping ways, Sarah proves a dab hand at deflecting her many leading questions - much to both Doris' frustration. At Ash Park, while Olivia remains feeling unwell and disconcerted by James' continued distance, it's Elizabeth who's the most put out - irritated by the fact Sarah continues to be the talk of the dinner table. But, alerted by James to the fact that her continued disparaging of Sarah is starting to raise eyebrows Elizabeth decides to allay suspicion by inviting Sarah to a fundraising concert at the local hospital.
3	3	"Truth Will Out"	Lynn-Maree Danzey	Trent Atkinson	12 May 2013	1,447,000
The horrors of the war cast a long, unwelcome shadow over Inverness as Jack heads out around town with Sarah on her first day at work. Unable to stop wondering about the woman James admitted to loving in Europe, Olivia searches for any memento he may have kept of her. It is in her wedding album that she makes the shocking discovery of who the person he loved is.
4	4	"The Mona Lisa Smile"	Mark Joffe	Trent Atkinson	19 May 2013	1,377,000
Yom Kippur is approaching and Sarah performs a mikveh in the local creek — a spiritual, cleansing ritual that's unfortunately witnessed by Doris Collins. But while Sarah finds it hard to deal with Doris' reaction to her nudity, it is Sarah's own, personal demons that she is struggling with most. The wealthy Swanson family visit inverness as Andrew, their handsome and extremely eligible son, hopes to impress Anna.
5	5	"Day of Atonement"	Mark Joffe	Rick Held	26 May 2013	1,434,000
Doris Collins witnesses Sarah performing a spiritual cleansing in the creek. The Blighs receive a visit from the Swanson family. Elizabeth hopes Anna will form a romantic attachment to their son, Andrew. Gino is harassed by Bert Ford, and Sarah later saves him from a beating. Olivia finally realises that James was in love with her brother, William. Anna and Gino have sex for the first time.
6	6	"That's Amore"	Lynn Hegarty	Hamilton Budd	2 June 2013	1,457,000
After learning Bert has been beating Eve, Sarah confronts him in the pub and humiliates him. Olivia confronts James with her suspicions and their marriage reaches breaking point. Anna asks Sarah to get her contraception after she has sex with Gino for the first time. Eve goes into labour and with the help of George, Sarah delivers the baby safely. Gino proposes to Anna.
7	7	"Boom!"	Lynn Hegarty	Tony Morphett	9 June 2013	1,322,000
Anna goes to visit her aunt Carolyn and purchases contraception. James contemplates committing suicide. George is asked by Henry Swanson and Robert Menzies to host a Japanese trade delegation. Elizabeth reveals that her husband was also a homosexual in the hope that it will help Olivia and James. Sarah returns home to be at her dying mother's bedside. Elizabeth collapses.
8	8	"Worlds Apart"	Lynn-Maree Danzey	Sarah Walker	16 June 2013	1,467,000
Elizabeth is rushed to hospital, and Jack reveals she has had a heart attack. Anna and Gino postpone telling their parents about their engagement. Carla finds Anna's diaphragm and learns of her relationship with Gino. Olivia admits she was hoping Elizabeth had died. Harry and James try to work together despite their sexual tension. George and Sarah go on a picnic and kiss.
9	9	"Cane Toad"	Lynn-Maree Danzey	Trent Atkinson	23 June 2013	1,407,000
Sarah and George begin a secret affair. Anna tries to push her father and Sarah closer so that he will approve of her and Gino. Olivia is overjoyed when her child begins to move. George's sister-in-law, Regina arrives after being summoned by Elizabeth. James and Harry continue to play down their feelings for each other. Sarah is greeted by Regina with a racist remark.
10	10	"Lest We Forget"	Ian Barry	Bevan Lee	30 June 2013	1,448,000
George hosts a Japanese trade delegation on Remembrance Day. Jack attends the event, but struggles with his memories of being held as a POW. He later gets drunk and tells Sarah he loves her. Sarah realises Regina's open hostility is caused by antisemitism. Gino fears his relationship with Anna is over. With Carolyn's help, Anna learns she is pregnant.
11	11	"True to Your Heart"	Ian Barry	Rick Held	7 July 2013	1,385,000
Elizabeth is released from hospital and is informed of George and Sarah's affair. After tension builds between himself and Harry, James and Olivia decide it best to move to Sydney. Carolyn reveals she is Anna's mother. Sarah slaps Regina after an incredibly racist comment. Despite Elizabeth's threats to disown him, George proposes to Sarah.
12	12	"New Beginning"	Mark Joffe	Hamilton Budd	14 July 2013	1,452,000
Much to Elizabeth's displeasure, Sarah accepts George's proposal. James and Harry share a sexually charged moment and kiss. Regina continues to dig deeper into Sarah's past. Anna suffers a miscarriage. Elizabeth and Olivia resolve their issues before she and James leave for Sydney. Bert blackmails the Blighs after discovering James' homosexuality.
13	13	"Secret Love"	Mark Joffe	Bevan Lee and Tony Morphett	21 July 2013	1,494,000
Elizabeth delivers Sarah with an ultimatum. George confronts James about his homosexuality. With Olivia by his side, James submits himself to electroconvulsive therapy. Anna and Gino's parents agree to let them have a trial marriage. Regina gets closer to discovering the truth about Sarah and gets Elizabeth's approval to pursue George. Carolyn tells Jack that he has a daughter, but does not say who it is. Bert turns up dead in the lake.
