= List of A Place to Call Home episodes =

A Place to Call Home is an Australian television drama series created by Bevan Lee. It debuted on the Seven Network on 28 April 2013. Set against the backdrop of the post-war social change, it follows Sarah Nordmann (Marta Dusseldorp), who has returned to Australia after twenty years abroad to start a new life and ends up clashing with wealthy matriarch Elizabeth Bligh (Noni Hazlehurst).

The sixth and final season premiered on 19 August 2018.

== Series overview ==
Series	Channel	Episodes	Originally released		OzTAM viewership	Rank
Series	Channel	Episodes	First released	Last released	OzTAM viewership	Rank
1	Seven	13	28 April 2013	21 July 2013	1,480,000	8
2	Seven	10	11 May 2014	13 July 2014	1,150,000	7
3	SoHo	10	27 September 2015	29 November 2015	168,000	2
4	Showcase	12	11 September 2016	27 November 2016	139,000	2
5	Showcase	12	8 October 2017	24 December 2017	104,000	3
6	Showcase	10	19 August 2018	21 October 2018	114,000	TBA

== Episodes ==
=== Season 1 (2013) ===
No. overall	No. in season	Title	Directed by	Written by	Original release date	Australian viewers (millions)
1	1	"The Prodigal Daughter"	Roger Hodgman	Trent Atkinson and Bevan Lee	28 April 2013	1,930,000
2	2	"The Welcome Mat"	Lynn-Maree Danzey	Trent Atkinson	5 May 2013	1,539,000
3	3	"Truth Will Out"	Lynn-Maree Danzey	Trent Atkinson	12 May 2013	1,447,000
4	4	"The Mona Lisa Smile"	Mark Joffe	Trent Atkinson	19 May 2013	1,377,000
5	5	"Day of Atonement"	Mark Joffe	Rick Held	26 May 2013	1,434,000
6	6	"That's Amore"	Lynn Hegarty	Hamilton Budd	2 June 2013	1,457,000
7	7	"Boom!"	Lynn Hegarty	Tony Morphett	9 June 2013	1,322,000
8	8	"Worlds Apart"	Lynn-Maree Danzey	Sarah Walker	16 June 2013	1,467,000
9	9	"Cane Toad"	Lynn-Maree Danzey	Trent Atkinson	23 June 2013	1,407,000
10	10	"Lest We Forget"	Ian Barry	Bevan Lee	30 June 2013	1,448,000
11	11	"True to Your Heart"	Ian Barry	Rick Held	7 July 2013	1,385,000
12	12	"New Beginning"	Mark Joffe	Hamilton Budd	14 July 2013	1,452,000
13	13	"Secret Love"	Mark Joffe	Bevan Lee and Tony Morphett	21 July 2013	1,494,000

=== Season 2 (2014–15) ===
No. overall	No. in season	Title	Directed by	Written by	Original release date	Australian viewers (millions)
14	1	"No Secrets, Ever"	Mark Joffe	Trent Atkinson	11 May 2014	1,092,000
15	2	"I Believe"	Mark Joffe	Tony Morphett	18 May 2014	1,041,000
16	3	"A Kiss to Build a Dream On"	Lynn-Maree Danzey	Rick Held	25 May 2014	1,159,000
17	4	"What Your Heart Says"	Lynn-Maree Danzey	Hamilton Budd	1 June 2014	1,213,000
18	5	"The Ghosts of Christmas Past"	Lynn Hegarty	Brooke Wilson	8 June 2014	1,137,000
19	6	"Auld Lang Syne"	Lynn Hegarty	Bevan Lee	15 June 2014	1,186,000
20	7	"No Other Love"	Mark Joffe	Bevan Lee	22 June 2014	1,182,000
21	8	"Answer Me, My Love"	Mark Joffe	Trent Atkinson	22 June 2014^{[a]}	1,150,000
22	9	"I Do, I Do"	Lynn-Maree Danzey	Hamilton Budd	6 July 2014	1,210,000
23a	10a	"Unforgettable"	Lynn-Maree Danzey	Bevan Lee & Kim Wilson	13 July 2014	1,302,000
23b	10b	"Unforgettable"	Lynn-Maree Danzey	Bevan Lee & Kim Wilson	13 September 2015	51,000

=== Season 3 (2015) ===
No. overall	No. in season	Title	Directed by	Written by	Original release date	Australian viewers (millions)
24	1	"The Things We Do for Love"	Ian Barry	David Hannam	27 September 2015	154,000
25	2	"L'Chaim, to Life"	Ian Barry	Giula Sandler	4 October 2015	154,000
26	3	"Somewhere Beyond the Sea"	Lynn-Maree Danzey	Katherine Thomson	11 October 2015	154,000
27	4	"Too Old to Dream"	Lynn-Maree Danzey	Deborah Parsons	18 October 2015	170,000
28	5	"Living in the Shadow"	Shirley Barrett	Kim Wilson	25 October 2015	167,000
29	6	"In the Heat of the Night"	Shirley Barrett	Sarah Lambert	1 November 2015	174,000
30	7	"The Sins of the Father"	Chris-Martin Jones	John Ridley	8 November 2015	198,000
31	8	"Til Death Do Us Part"	Chris Martin-Jones	Giula Sandler	15 November 2015	178,000
32	9	"The Mourners' Kadish"	Lynn-Maree Danzey	Katherine Thomson	22 November 2015	169,000
33	10	"The Love Undeniable"	Lynn-Maree Danzey	David Hannam	29 November 2015	163,000

=== Season 4 (2016) ===
No. overall	No. in season	Title	Directed by	Written by	Original release date	Australian viewers (millions)
34	1	"A Nagging Doubt"	Shirley Barrett	Bevan Lee	11 September 2016	101,000
35	2	"Bad in a Good Way"	Shirley Barrett	Bevan Lee	18 September 2016	156,000
36	3	"When You're Smiling"	Kriv Stenders	Bevan Lee	25 September 2016	136,000
37	4	"Home to Roost"	Kriv Stenders	Bevan Lee	2 October 2016	126,000
38	5	"Happy Days Are Here Again"	Catherine Millar	Bevan Lee	9 October 2016	136,000
39	6	"The Trouble with Harry"	Catherine Millar	Bevan Lee	16 October 2016	142,000
40	7	"You're Just in Love"	Shirley Barrett	Bevan Lee	23 October 2016	149,000
41	8	"There'll Be Some Changes Made"	Shirley Barrett	Katherine Thomson	30 October 2016	150,000
42	9	"Where Will the Baby's Dimple Be"	Tony Krawitz	Katherine Thomson	6 November 2016	135,000
43	10	"And the Blind Shall See"	Tony Krawitz	Bevan Lee	13 November 2016	128,000
44	11	"Catch the Tiger"	Catherine Millar	Katherine Thomson	20 November 2016	132,000
45	12	"All Good Things"	Catherine Millar	Bevan Lee	27 November 2016	173,000

=== Season 5 (2017) ===
No. overall	No. in season	Title	Directed by	Written by	Original release date	Australian viewers (millions)
46	1	"Own Worst Enemy"	Kevin Carlin	Bevan Lee	8 October 2017	163,000
47	2	"Fallout"	Kevin Carlin	Katherine Thomson	15 October 2017	105,000
48	3	"All That Glitters"	Mark Joffe	John Lonie	22 October 2017	93,000
49	4	"The Edge of Reason"	Mark Joffe	David Hannam	29 October 2017	91,000
50	5	"Do Not Go Gently"	Catherine Miller	Kristen Dunphy	5 November 2017	88,000
51	6	"Demons of the Dark"	Catherine Millar	John Lonie	12 November 2017	110,000
52	7	"The Anatomy of His Passing"	Jeremy Sims	David Hannam	19 November 2017	101,000
53	8	"Cloud Break"	Jeremy Sims	Katherine Thomson	26 November 2017	98,000
54	9	"All That Lies Ahead"	Mark Joffe	Cathryn Strickland	3 December 2017	107,000
55	10	"Death Comes as an End"	Mark Joffe	Bevan Lee	10 December 2017	122,000
56	11	"Lie Deep"	Catherine Millar	Katherine Thomson	17 December 2017	100,000
57	12	"In Memoriam"	Catherine Millar	Bevan Lee	24 December 2017	66,000

=== Season 6 (2018) ===
No. overall	No. in season	Title	Directed by	Written by	Original release date	Australian viewers (millions)
58	1	"For Better or Worse"	Jeremy Sims	Bevan Lee	19 August 2018	142,000
59	2	"Salt of the Earth"	Jeremy Sims	Bevan Lee	26 August 2018	108,000
60	3	"Darkness and Light"	Catherine Millar	Bevan Lee	2 September 2018	104,000
61	4	"Against the Tide"	Catherine Millar	Katherine Thomson	9 September 2018	115,000
62	5	"Look Not in My Eyes"	Amanda Brotchie	Katherine Thomson	16 September 2018	128,000
63	6	"Staring Down the Barrel"	Amanda Brotchie	Bevan Lee	23 September 2018	118,000
64	7	"New Adventures"	Jeremy Sims	Bevan Lee	30 September 2018	89,000
65	8	"Autumn Affairs"	Jeremy Sims	Bevan Lee	7 October 2018	108,000
66	9	"Life Longs for Itself"	Catherine Millar	Katherine Thomson	14 October 2018	99,000
67	10	"Reaching Home"	Catherine Millar	Bevan Lee	21 October 2018	128,000

== Specials ==
No.	Title	Original release date	Australian viewers
1	"An Audience with the Cast of A Place to Call Home"	20 September 2015	60,000
2	"A Place to Call Home: The Story So Far"	11 September 2016	122,000
3	"A Place to Call Home: The Final Chapter"	18 August 2018	N/A
