= Aldo Mignone =

Australian actor

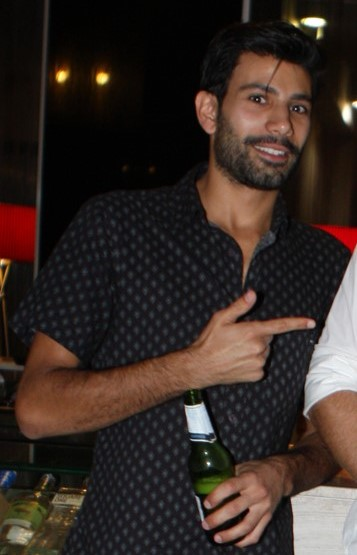
- Mignone in 2013
- Born: Adelaide, South Australia
- Occupation: Actor
- Known for: A Place To Call Home

Aldo Mignone is an Australian television and stage actor of Italian descent. He is best known for playing Gino Poletti in the period television drama series, A Place to Call Home between 2013 and 2016.

== Early ==
Mignone was born to Italian-Australian parents in Adelaide in South Australia. His grandparents immigrated to Australia from Italy in the 1950s. He attended Rostrevor College, an independent Catholic school in Adelaide. His sister, Louisa Mignone, is also an actress. He later studied at the National Institute of Dramatic Art in Sydney for two years.

== Career ==
In 2011, Mignone played Pierre, a series regular, in SBS series, Danger 5.

In 2012, Mignone was cast alongside Marta Dusseldorp, Noni Hazlehurst and Abby Earl in the dynasty period drama series, A Place to Call Home on the Seven Network.

In 2016, he took on a stage role, in the psychological thriller Belleville, directed by Claudia Barrie at Woolloomooloo’s Old Fitz Theatre.

In 2018, he appeared alongside Rachel Griffiths and Matt Nable in the SBS, crime drama mini-series, Dead Lucky.

In 2020, Mignone resumed his role of Pierre in Danger 5 for an Audible sequel.

== Filmography ==
Year	Title	Role	Notes
2007	Italian Spiderman		Short film
2011	Ostia: The Last Night	Ninetto	Short film
2011	Blue Monday		Short film
2011–2015	Danger 5	Pierre	Series regular (season 1), guest (season 2)
2012	The Alien Boy	Peaceful protestor	Short film
2013–2016	A Place to Call Home	Gino Poletti	Series regular; seasons 1–4
2016	Black Comedy	Guest cast	1 episode
2018	Dead Lucky	Eduardo Torries	Miniseries regular, 4 episodes

== Personal life ==
In 2015, he was a "Bachelor of the Year" nominee for Cleo Magazine.

Mignone is married to Isabella Wood, with whom he operates Studio Mignone, a sculptural furniture start up in Adelaide.

== Awards and nominations ==
Year	Category	Award	Series	Result
2015	Cleo Bachelor of the Year	-	-	nominated
2014	Outstanding Performance by an Ensemble Series in a Drama Series	Equity Ensemble Awards	A Place to Call Home	nominated
