= A Place to Call Home (TV series) =

Australian TV drama series (2013-2018)

- Genre: Period drama
- Created by: Bevan Lee
- Starring: Marta Dusseldorp; Noni Hazlehurst; Brett Climo; Craig Hall; David Berry; Abby Earl; Arianwen Parkes-Lockwood; Aldo Mignone; Frankie J. Holden; Sara Wiseman; Jenni Baird; Tim Draxl; Matt Levett
- Composer: Michael Yezerski
- Country of origin: Australia
- Original language: English
- No. of series: 6
- No. of episodes: 67 (list of episodes)

Production
- Executive producers: John Holmes; Julie McGauran; Penny Win
- Producer: Chris Martin-Jones
- Cinematography: John Stokes
- Running time: 42–45 minutes
- Production company: Seven Productions

Original release
- Network: Seven Network (2013–14); SoHo (2015); Showcase (2016–18)
- Release: 28 April 2013 – 21 October 2018

A Place to Call Home is an Australian television drama series, created by Bevan Lee for the Seven Network, which premiered in 2013. Set in rural New South Wales after World War II, it follows Sarah Adams (Marta Dusseldorp), who has returned to Australia after twenty years abroad to start a new life and ends up clashing with wealthy matriarch Elizabeth Bligh (Noni Hazlehurst). The main cast also includes Brett Climo (George Bligh), Craig Hall (Dr. Jack Duncan), David Berry (James Bligh), Abby Earl (Anna Bligh), Arianwen Parkes-Lockwood (Olivia Bligh), Aldo Mignone (Gino Poletti), Sara Wiseman (Carolyn Bligh), Jenni Baird (Regina Standish), Tim Draxl (Henry Fox), and Frankie J. Holden (Roy Briggs). The show was cancelled after its second season, but obtained further funding and concluded successfully in 2018 after six seasons.

== Cast and characters ==
=== Main continuing characters ===
- Marta Dusseldorp as Sarah Adams, who despite a strict Catholic upbringing, moved to Paris to be with the man she loved, and adopted his Jewish faith. She comes to work for the local hospital near the Bligh family, whom she met while serving as a nurse on the ship taking them back to Australia from Europe. Later, she is astonished to hear a report that her husband is still alive following World War II, and her life again spins into troubled times.
- Noni Hazlehurst as Elizabeth Bligh, the headstrong and stubborn matriarch of the Bligh family. She at first worries that Sarah will endanger the Bligh family's social position, but she mellows over time. She intuits James' homosexuality, since her own husband also had affairs with men, but she pressures James to stay in the marriage as she had done in her own past. Later in the series, she leaves for Sydney to live with her daughter Carolyn, and becomes a less-domineering, more-relaxed person.
- Brett Climo as George Bligh, Elizabeth's son, a good-hearted man who takes Sarah under his protection and gradually falls in love with her. He is Elaine's widower and father to James and Anna, although it eventually emerges that Anna is the secret child of his sister Carolyn and their friend Jack; she was taken in by George and Elaine to spare Carolyn any scandal. His high expectations of James puts his son in danger, until eventually George remembers having once seen his own father kissing another man. George later runs for public office and takes over as lord of the estate. In later years, he has a child by Sarah.
- Craig Hall as Jack Duncan, the secret, past lover of Carolyn and secret father to Anna, who now faces many challenges in his work as a doctor in a hospital run by the Bligh family. He is compassionate and generous, despite his episodic personal problems with addiction and depression, and devotes his energy to helping others. Over the series, he and Carolyn connect with their daughter Anna and reconnect with each other.
- David Berry as James Bligh (regular: seasons 1–4, 6; recurring: season 5), the only son of George and Elaine, who grows up believing Anna is his sister. In spite of his relationships with local farmhand Harry and fellow student William, he marries William's sister Olivia but, still tormented by his gay desires, he tries to commit suicide. During Olivia's pregnancy, he undergoes electroconvulsive therapy and aversion therapy in attempts to change his sexuality. He feels betrayed when Olivia has an affair, but returns to Ash Park to live for his son. He gets involved with Henry, his father's physician, and later moves to the Riviera in France with William, where he feels he can be fully himself.
- Arianwen Parkes-Lockwood as Olivia Bligh, James' wife, a newlywed from England at the start of the series. She does not know that James is secretly in love with her brother, William. She develops anger toward James for his indifference to her desperate need for affection, but eventually tries to come to terms with his sexuality in the interests of their son, Georgie, and of the family estate. She hides for many months the fact that her baby with James died in the womb and that the baby she brought home is not really theirs.
- Abby Earl as Anna Bligh, the secret child of Carolyn and Jack, who was raised believing she was daughter of George and Elaine. Anna marries a local farmer, Gino, after rebelling against the expectations of the Bligh family. The marriage faces difficulties, however, when Gino goes into debt, and his attempts to expand the farm fail. Anna becomes a novelist and later has a child with Henry.
- Frankie J. Holden as Roy Briggs, a kindly old farmer who lives alone at the series start. He is very generous toward Sarah from the time she arrives in town, eventually offering her a refuge in his small home. They develop an easy, informal, mutually-supportive friendship.
- Sara Wiseman as Carolyn Bligh (regular: season 2–6; recurring: season 1). Much like her secret daughter Anna, Carolyn was the rebel child of her generation. For a long time, she gave up on any relationship with the Bligh family, and has had little contact for years. Once her secret is revealed, she is reunited with her long-separated daughter Anna and they develop an even closer relationship than before. Later on, Carolyn works for Sir Richard Bennett, encountering new problems.
- Tim Draxl as Doctor Henry Fox (regular: season 3–6), the physician who helps to save George's life after he is shot. Henry befriends James, and they realize their mutual attraction is stronger than mere friendship. Henry helps James learn how to be gay without attracting attention, and the Bligh family eventually accepts their relationship as beneficial for James' mental stability. Henry falls under the devious control of Regina, when she blackmails him into supplying her with morphine for her addiction. He moves to Inverness to be with James, but is devastated when James abandons him to live in Europe with an old flame. In the end of season 5, he has a one-night-stand with Anna Bligh. Towards the end of season 6, Anna gives birth to their daughter, Elaine Elizabeth Bligh, and she and Henry agree to co-parent. Eventually, Henry connects with Harry and begins a romantic relationship. In the series finale, we find out that Henry and Harry got legally married in 2018, both of them in their 90's.
- Deborah Kennedy as Doris Collins (regular: season 4–6; recurring: seasons 1–3), the most widely-known member of the Inverness village, who seems omnipresent on her bicycle. Although she means well, her gossiping ways can sometimes make her seem rude and intrusive. Sarah dislikes her at first, but as time goes on, finds her helpful as someone who always knows who has done what in the village.
- Dominic Allburn as Harry Polson (regular: season 1 & 6; recurring: season 4), Amy Polson's gay brother, who had had a furtive romantic involvement with James when they were teens. Harry again kisses James, which is observed by Bert, who then beats him up, kicks him out, and blackmails James' family. After another severe beating, Sarah helps Harry to settle back into a more stable life at Inverness. Eventually, Harry connects with Henry and begins a romantic relationship. In the series finale, we find out that Harry and Henry got legally married in 2018, both of them in their 90s.
- Aaron Pedersen as Frank Gibbs, an Aboriginal Australian man, a war veteran broken by the effects of his service and by racist treatment. He paints watercolours and is discovered by Carolyn who encourages him to show his work. Frank and Jack bond over their shared military experience. Early in their friendship, Jack remarks that "a bullet can’t tell the colour of your skin. We all took the same risks." Both men learn to trust each other and begin to break free of their self-imposed prisons.

=== Main departed characters ===
- Aldo Mignone as Gino Poletti (seasons 1–4), the young, handsome Italian farmer who has set Anna's heart on fire. He has a real passion for farming and trying to please everybody, but his ambitious business decisions are not very successful.
- Jenni Baird as Regina Standish (season 1–5), the widowed, wealthy, but still money-hungry sister of George's late wife, Elaine. Regina is the opposite of who Elaine had been: cold, bitter, and scheming, she despises Jews and openly displays religious intolerance toward Sarah. Regina has now set her sights on the widower George's inheritance, and would take extreme actions to achieve her goals regardless of anyone she sees as an obstacle. After being committed in an asylum for the murder of Millie Davis and a policeman, Regina is released in 1958. She returns to the town and helps Sarah and George fight Sir Richard's cruel intentions. She succumbs to an overdose of morphine, thought to be administered by Sir Richard, at the end of season 5. Her body is found in the river, and he is arrested for murder, but it is later determined that she committed suicide.
- Matt Levett as Andrew Swanson (guest: season 6; regular: season 2; recurring: season 1), a somewhat-entitled heir apparent who tries to win the hand of Anna Bligh.
- Ben Winspear as Doctor Rene Nordmann (regular: season 3; recurring: season 2), the long-lost first love and husband of Sarah Adams. First seen only in flashback, Rene had been arrested by the Nazi occupiers of Paris, and had disappeared without a trace. Later, when Sarah is amazed to learn that he is still alive, she travels to Paris to rescue him from the deep psychological damage caused by his long ordeal of imprisonment and torture. Rene has great difficulty adjusting to normal life, and still seems to carry his imprisonment within him. Much of his behavior is attributable to shrapnel in the brain.
- Brenna Harding as Rose O'Connell (regular: season 4; recurring: season 3)
- Robert Coleby as Douglas Goddard, a retiree who operates a club for Australian war veterans. He marries Elizabeth Bligh but dies in season 5.

=== Recurring characters ===
- Heather Mitchell as Prudence Swanson, the wealthy friend of Elizabeth. Prudence socializes with Elizabeth whenever she comes to visit Sydney. As a member of Sydney's upper class, she is very aristocratic and looks down her nose at Sarah when she arrives for a garden party.
- Judi Farr as Peg Maloney, the aunt of Sarah Adams, who writes to her frequently from her home in Sydney. She and Sarah have grown very close, and when Sarah later decides to take a difficult action, she asks Peg for help.
- Krew Boylan and then Amy Mathews as Amy Polson, the maid of the Bligh household, sister to Harry and sister-in-law to Bert. When Regina suspects that James is gay, she manipulates Amy into spying for her, which eventually forces Elizabeth to dismiss Amy with great sorrow. After James's aversion therapy, Amy's face reminds him of her brother Harry, causing him to develop intense nausea.
- Dina Panozzo as Carla Poletti, the mother of Gino. She is very critical of the relationship with Anna and her son, saying that it will never work because she is not Catholic. But when George accedes, she does so as well.
- Angelo D'Angelo as Amo Poletti, the father of Gino
- Jacinta Acevski as Alma Grey
- Scott Grimley as Norman Parker (driver)
- Rick Donald as Lloyd Ellis-Parker, a talented portrait artist on temporary assignment, who seems to offer Olivia the romantic affection she desperately craves.
- Erica Lovell as Eve Walker, sister of Amy Polson and Harry Polson, in a turbulent relationship with Bert Ford.
- Michael Sheasby as Bert Ford, Amy and Harry's brother-in-law, a local yobbo who always seems to be looking for a fight. His suspicion of outsiders and religious intolerance make Sarah a natural target, as are the Italian Poletti family, and Harry and James, whose mutual attraction Bert uses to blackmail the Blighs. Bert is found dead in the lake, and the unknown circumstances surrounding his death haunt his former victims.
- Mark Lee as Sir Richard Bennett, a rich and powerful, but unprincipled owner of a major city newspaper. He is used to taking whatever he wishes to possess, including the people around him.
- Conrad Coleby as Matthew Goddard, Douglas' son who returns to town after his father's death. He starts dating Olivia and later asks her to marry him.
- Avital Greenberg-Teplitsky as Leah Goldberg/Gold (Seasons 1 & 2)
- Madeleine Clunies-Ross as Leah Gold, a young Jewish woman living in Inverness
- Elliot Domoney as David Bligh, George and Sarah Bligh's Son. (Seasons 5 & 6)
- Milly Alcock as Emma Carvolth (4 episodes)
- Nicholas Bell as Neil Burton (3 episodes)

== Production ==
Development for A Place to Call Home began after Bevan Lee completed his "domestic trilogy" (Always Greener, Packed to the Rafters, and Winners & Losers). He took inspiration from film director Douglas Sirk's 1950s films, such as Written on the Wind (1956) and All That Heaven Allows (1955). Lee told The Age that he wanted to create a romance-driven melodrama based in the 1950s because people's lives in the present are "relatively bland". He said, "At the end of the day, conflict is drama and we live in relatively conflict-free society. I had to go to a place where there was pain and damage and hurt; after the war there was." The script was co-written by Lee and Trent Atkinson.

Noni Hazlehurst (Elizabeth Bligh) was the first cast member to be announced for A Place to Call Home, on 18 June 2012. Marta Dusseldorp (Sarah Adams), Brett Climo (George Bligh) and Frankie J. Holden (Roy Briggs) were announced a month later, with Dusseldorp leading the overall cast. Newcomers David Berry (James Bligh), Arianwen Parkes-Lockwood (Olivia Bligh), Abby Earl (Anna Bligh) and Aldo Mignone (Gino Poletti), made up the rest of the main cast.

A Place to Call Home is set primarily in both the fictional estate "Ash Park" and the nearby fictional country town of "Inverness" in New South Wales. Inverness was also used as the country setting of Always Greener. Camden and the Southern Highlands in New South Wales serves as the backdrop for Inverness. Ash Park is actually Camelot, a heritage-listed property located at Kirkham, on the outskirts of Camden. Sydney, the capital city of New South Wales, is a third location where major events occur, but most city scenes are filmed indoors, aside from some establishing shots such as historic footage of the Sydney Harbour Bridge.

Filming for the first season began on 9 July 2012 and concluded on 12 December 2012. Season one was shot on a Sony F65 camera, the first Australian television production to do so.

In June 2013, Erin McWhirter of TV Week announced that A Place to Call Home had been renewed for another season. Abby Earl told McWhirter, "We're locked in pre-production in August and then we start filming in September, so there's plenty of time for me to get back in Anna's shoes." The second season started on 11 May 2014 and concluded on 13 July 2014.

TV Week confirmed that a third season had been commissioned. In June 2014, however, the magazine reported that Channel Seven had declined the option to renew the series, and that the cast and crew had been told that they would not be required for a third season.

On 15 October 2014, it was announced that Foxtel had finalised a deal with Channel Seven that would see a third season written by Bevan Lee, produced by Seven Productions, but aired on Foxtel. On 25 October 2014, The Daily Telegraph announced that A Place to Call Home was renewed for another two seasons and would return in late 2015, airing on Foxtel channel, SoHo. It was also announced that all the original cast and crew members would return.

On 16 August 2015 it was announced via the official Facebook page that season 3 would premiere on 27 September 2015 on SoHo. Season 4 premiered on Foxtel's Showcase channel on 11 September 2016.

Season 5 was announced by Foxtel on 16 November 2016. The timeline of season 5 skips ahead from 1954 to the year 1958. Production of A Place to Call Home resumed in February 2017 with principal photography continuing through July 2017. Season 5 premiered on Foxtel's Showcase Channel in Australia starting on 8 October 2017.

A sixth and final season was announced by Foxtel on 6 December 2017, which was noted to be the last in March 2018. The final season began airing on 19 August 2018 and the final episode aired 21 October 2018.

== Release ==
=== Broadcast ===
Series overview
Series	Channel	Episodes	Originally released		OzTAM viewership	Rank
Series	Channel	Episodes	First released	Last released	OzTAM viewership	Rank
1	Seven	13	28 April 2013	21 July 2013	1,480,000	8
2	Seven	10	11 May 2014	13 July 2014	1,150,000	7
3	SoHo	10	27 September 2015	29 November 2015	168,000	2
4	Showcase	12	11 September 2016	27 November 2016	139,000	2
5	Showcase	12	8 October 2017	24 December 2017	104,000	3
6	Showcase	10	19 August 2018	21 October 2018	114,000	TBA

When Seven Network revealed its new television series lineup for 2012, A Place to Call Home was mentioned alongside other titles. Seven Network's Angus Ross said that it would potentially premiere in late 2012, but would not be rushed to air by a certain date unless "casting and other elements" were right. The first season of A Place to Call Home consisted of thirteen episodes. The pilot episode was originally broadcast on 28 April 2013, in the 8:30 pm time slot (previously occupied by Downton Abbey).

==== International ====
Shortly after airing in Australia A Place to Call Home started broadcasting on TV One in New Zealand.

Series one and two began airing on BBC2 in the United Kingdom on 17 November 2014, series three on 25 February 2016, and series four on 13 February 2017. The fifth series was promoted to a BBC1 daytime slot, and began airing daily on 13 March 2018. The sixth and final series aired on BBC1 on 11 February 2019.

All six seasons are available for streaming in the US and Canada on Acorn TV. The first four seasons were also distributed to television stations by American Public Television.

In 2020, all six seasons were made available for streaming in Sweden on SVT Play until 17 September, in Norway on NRK TV and in Finland on YLE TV1.

In 2020, the entire series began screening in Greece on ERT2 weekdays from 29 June as "Μια Καινούργια Αρχή" (A New Start).

=== Home media ===
Title	Set details	DVD release dates			Blu-ray release dates	Special features
Title	Set details	Region 1	Region 2	Region 4	Region B	Special features
A Place to Call Home – Season 1	Discs: 4 (Note: 2 discs in the UK. Blu-ray includes 3 discs.); Episodes: 13	3 March 2015	23 February 2015	8 August 2013		Photo gallery (region 2 only); Interviews with the Cast (region 4 only)
A Place to Call Home – Season 2	Discs: 3 (Note: Blu-ray and UK release includes 2 discs.); Episodes: 10	30 June 2015	23 February 2015	17 July 2014		Interviews; Young to Old: Sarah's Transformation; Character Profiles (region 1 & 2 only)
A Place to Call Home – Season 2: Revised Edition	Discs: 3; Episodes: 10	—N/a	—N/a	29 October 2015	—N/a	Interviews; Young to Old: Sarah's Transformation; Season 3 Character Profiles; Season 3 Trailer
A Place to Call Home – Season 2: Collector's Edition	Discs: 1; Episodes: 3	—N/a	—N/a	29 October 2015	—N/a	Interviews; Young to Old: Sarah's Transformation; Season 3 Character Profiles; Season 3 Trailer
A Place to Call Home – Season 3	Discs: 3 (Note: 2 discs in the UK.); Episodes: 10	5 April 2016	14 March 2016	7 April 2016	—N/a	New season 2 finale; Picture gallery; Season 3 episode recaps (region 4 only)
A Place to Call Home – Season 4	Discs: 3 (Note: 2 discs in the UK.); Episodes: 12	28 February 2017	6 March 2017	26 April 2017	—N/a	Region 1: Cast and crew interviews (region 1 only); Behind-the-scenes featurettes (region 1 only); Photo gallery
A Place to Call Home – Season 5	Discs: 3 (Note: 4 discs in the US, and 2 in the UK); Episodes: 12	3 April 2018	2 April 2018	28 March 2018	—N/a	Q and A with Jenni Baird (region 1 only)

==== Box sets ====
Title	Set details	DVD release dates			Special features
Title	Set details	Region 1	Region 2	Region 4	Special features
A Place to Call Home – Season 1 & 2	Discs: 7; Episodes: 23	—N/a	—N/a	29 October 2015	Interviews; Young to Old: Sarah's Transformation; Season 3 Character Profiles; Season 3 Trailer
A Place to Call Home – Complete Seasons One to Three	Discs: 10 (Note: 6 discs in the UK.); Episodes: 33	—N/a	14 March 2016	1 September 2016	Interviews; Young to Old: Sarah's Transformation; Season 3 Character Profiles; Season 3 Trailer; New season 2 finale (region 2 & 4); Picture gallery (region 2 & 4); Season 3 episode recaps
A Place to Call Home – Complete Seasons 1–4	Discs: 13 (Note: 8 discs in the UK.); Episodes: 45	—N/a	6 March 2017	26 April 2017	Alternative series two finale (region 2)
A Place to Call Home – Complete Seasons 1–5	Discs: 16; Episodes: 57	TBA	TBA	28 March 2018	Region 4: Interviews; Young to Old: Sarah's Transformation; Season 3 Character Profiles; Season 3 Trailer; New Season 2 Finale; Season 3 Episode Recaps; Photo Gallery

=== Soundtrack ===
A Place to Call Home – Music from Seasons 1–5 was released on 20 October 2017

Disc 1
No.	Title	Artist	Length
1.	"A Place to Call Home Theme" (season 2)	Michael Yezerski	1:43
2.	"Motherland" (season 1)	Michael Yezerski	2:44
3.	"Ebb Tide" (season 1)	Stuie French featuring Shanley Del	2:45
4.	"Music! Music! Music!" (season 1)	Teresa Brewer	2:46
5.	"Heart and Soul" (season 1)	The Four Aces featuring Al Alberts	2:19
6.	"We're Going to have a Baby" (season 1)	Michael Yezerski	1:58
7.	"Bewitched, Bothered and Bewildered" (season 1)	Ella Fitzgerald	7:05
8.	"It's Coming" (season 2)	Michael Yezerski	3:03
9.	"The Anniversary Waltz" (season 1)	Vera Lynn	2:46
10.	"You Belong to Me" (season 1)	Jo Stafford	3:15
11.	"Mona Lisa" (season 1)	Michael Yezerski featuring Glenn Cunningham	1:51
12.	"When I Fall in Love" (season 2)	Nat King Cole	3:13
13.	"Mr. & Mrs. James Bligh" (season 1)	Michael Yezerski	1:53
14.	"A Kiss to Build a Dream On" (season 2)	Louis Armstrong	3:05
15.	"Lullaby of Broadway" (season 1)	Doris Day with the Norman Luboff Choir and the Buddy Cole Quartet	2:30
16.	"Ash Park Morning" (season 1)	Michael Yezerski	1:19
17.	"Rag Mop" (season 1)	The Ames Brothers	2:41
18.	"Botch-a-Me (Ba-Ba-Baciami Piccina)" (season 1)	Rosemary Clooney	2:20
19.	"Sh-Boom" (Single Version; season 2)	The Crew Cuts	2:50
20.	"Sway" (season 1)	Stuie French featuring Paul Fisher	2:44
21.	"Paris" (season 2)	Michael Yezerski	2:16
22.	"I Believe" (season 2)	Michael Yezerski featuring Martha Marlow	1:56
23.	"Are You Awake?" (season 2)	Michael Yezerski	1:46
24.	"No Other Love" (season 2)	Michael Yezerski featuring Alex Oomens	3:41
25.	"Side by Side" (season 1)	Kay Starr	2:55
26.	"You're Nobody till Somebody Loves You" (season 1)	The Mills Brothers	2:25
27.	"Undecided" (season 1)	The Ames Brothers	3:01
28.	"At Last" (season 1)	Etta James	3:04
29.	"Amazing Grace" (season 1)	Michael Yezerski featuring Mahalia Barnes	1:50

== Reception ==
The series was praised in a 2021 column by Michael Oren, former Israeli ambassador to the United States, in the Jewish online magazine, Tablet. Oren wrote that: "Sarah ranks as one of the most complex characters to appear in contemporary television—principled, passionate, long-suffering, and intrepid." He continued: "A Place to Call Home proves that Jews, God, and Israel needn’t be lambasted or lampooned to achieve high ratings."

=== Awards and nominations ===
Australian Cinematographers Society Awards

Year	Category	Nominee(s)	Work	Result	Ref
2014	Telefeatures, TV Drama & Mini Series Award of Distinction	John Stokes	Season 1, Episode 9: "Cane Toad"	Won	

Equity Ensemble Awards

Year	Category	Nominee(s)	Work	Result	Ref
2014	Most Outstanding Performance by an Ensemble in a Drama Series	Cast	Season 1	Nominated	

Logie Awards

Year	Category	Nominee	Work	Result	Ref
2014	Most Outstanding Drama Series	—N/a	A Place to Call Home	Nominated	
2014	Most Popular Actress	Marta Dusseldorp	A Place to Call Home	Nominated	
2014	Most Popular New Talent	Abby Earl	A Place to Call Home	Nominated	
2016	Best Actress	Marta Dusseldorp	A Place to Call Home	Nominated	
2016	Most Outstanding Supporting Actor	David Berry	A Place to Call Home	Nominated	
2016	Most Outstanding Supporting Actress	Jenni Baird	A Place to Call Home	Nominated	
2016	Best Drama Program	—N/a	A Place to Call Home	Nominated	
2016	Most Outstanding Drama Series	—N/a	A Place to Call Home	Nominated	
2017	Best Actress	Marta Dusseldorp	A Place to Call Home	Nominated	
2017	Most Outstanding Supporting Actress	Jenni Baird	A Place to Call Home	Nominated	
2017	Most Outstanding Drama Series	—N/a	A Place to Call Home	Won	
2018	Most Outstanding Drama Series	—N/a	A Place to Call Home	Nominated	
