= Dead Lucky (TV series) =

- Genre: Crime drama
- Written by: Ellie Beaumont; Drew Proffitt
- Directed by: David Ceasar
- Starring: Rachel Griffiths; Yoson An; Mojean Aria; Ian Meadows; Rhys Muldoon; Anna Samson; Xana Tang; Matt Nable; Sara West; Aldo Mignone; Sarah Thamin; Tessa de Josselin; Annie Maynard; Shameer Birges
- Composer: Michael Yezerski
- Country of origin: Australia
- Original language: English
- No. of series: 1
- No. of episodes: 4

Production
- Executive producers: Ellie Beaumont; Sue Masters; Drew Proffitt; Greg Sitch; Nina Stevenson
- Producer: Diane Haddon
- Cinematography: Matthew Temple
- Editor: Katrina Barker
- Running time: 60 minutes
- Production company: Subtext Pictures

Original release
- Network: SBS
- Release: 25 July – 15 August 2018

Dead Lucky is a four-part Australian crime thriller drama series, written and created by Ellie Beaumont and Drew Proffitt, that broadcast on SBS from 25 July 2018.

The series is one of three commissions made by SBS in 2017, alongside fellow crime thrillers Sunshine and Safe Harbour. The series was acquired by AMC Networks for premium subscription streaming service SundanceNow, which will screen the series in the United States, Canada, the United Kingdom, Ireland and German-speaking territories in Europe. In the United States, the series premiered in full on 20 September 2018.

== Cast ==
- Rachel Griffiths as DS Grace Gibbs
- Yoson An as Charlie Fung
- Mojean Aria as Mani Dalir
- Ian Meadows as Corey Baxter
- Rhys Muldoon as Richard
- Anna Samson as Anna Jamison
- Xana Tang as Bo-Lin
- Matt Nable as Matt O’Reilly
- Sara West as Leah Baxter
- Aldo Mignone as Eduardo Torres
- Sarah Thamin as Mary Ho
- Tessa de Josselin as Jess Roberts
- Annie Maynard as Penny Weir
- Shameer Birges as Marco Varma
- Simon Burke as Tony Hodge
- Brooke Satchwell as Claire
- Karen Pang as Mrs. Fung
- Jon-Claire Lee as Mr. Fung
- Julia Savage as Edie O'Reilly
- Justine Clarke as Erica Hodge
- Natalie Saleeba as Imogen Lander
- Brad McMurray as Ivan Milski
- Takhi Saul as Tommy Meeky
- Tony Cogin as Ian Jamison
- Susana Downes as Emily Tran
- Jude Hyland as Toby Diago
- Patrick Ryan as Paramedic
- Ling-Hsueh Tang as Margaret

== Episodes ==
No.	Title	Directed by	Written by	Original release date	Australia viewers (millions)
1	"Episode 1"	David Caesar	Ellie Beaumont & Drew Proffitt	25 July 2018	N/A
2	"Episode 2"	David Caesar	Ellie Beaumont & Drew Proffitt	1 August 2018	N/A
3	"Episode 3"	David Caesar	Ellie Beaumont & Drew Proffitt	8 August 2018	N/A
4	"Episode 4"	David Caesar	Ellie Beaumont & Drew Proffitt	15 August 2018	N/A

== Home media ==
Umbrella Entertainment released the series on DVD in April 2019.

Title	Ep #	Discs	Region 4 (Australia)	Special features	Distributors
Dead Lucky: The Complete Series	4	2	3 April 2019	None	Umbrella Entertainment
