= Jenni Baird =

Australian actress

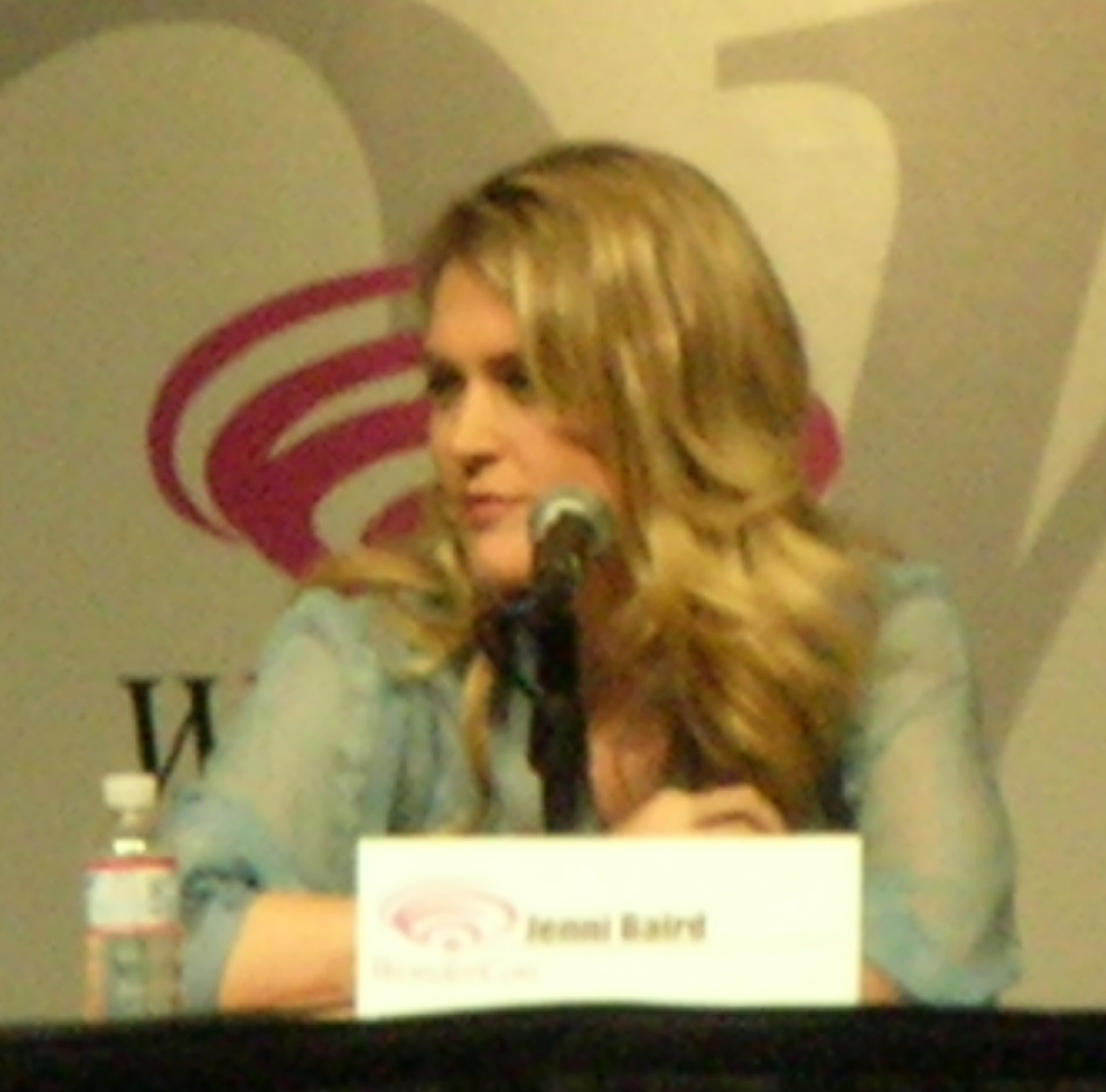
- Baird features at Wondercon on behalf of the movie Alien Trespass (2009)
- Born: April 29, 1976 (age 50); Sydney, New South Wales, Australia
- Education: Western Australian Academy of Performing Arts (1999)
- Occupation: Actress
- Years active: 1999–present
- Notable work: All Saints; A Place to Call Home; The 4400
- Height: 1.68 m (5 ft 6 in)

Jenni Baird (born 29 April 1976) is an Australian actress, who has appeared in several high-profile television series including in All Saints, A Place to Call Home and The 4400, and in Australian movies Alien Trespass and Backtrack.

== Early life ==
Baird attended the Western Australian Academy of Performing Arts (WAAPA), graduating in 1999. She then participated in the 1999 edition of the ANPC/Stages Young Playwrights Weekend.

== Career ==
Following her graduation from WAAPA, Baird made her debut in the Australian short film I Promise. In 2000, she appeared in the TV movie Metropolis playing Charlotte, and the following year, appeared in the TV soap drama Crash Palace as Chris Stanford.

Baird got her lucky break when she was cast in the long running, award-winning medical drama All Saints, appearing as the main character of Paula Morgan. She made her debut on the show on 6 November 2001, in the episode "A Little Death". After starring in over fifty episodes, her final appearance was in the episode "Bad Pennies" on 27 April 2004. When the series ended, her character also appeared prominently in the "Final Farewell" Trailer which featured recaps from across the entire show.

Baird made her American debut in the 2005 film Global Frequency, in which she starred as Dr. Katrina Finch. It was originally a pilot episode, but as the decision was ultimately made not to produce a series, it was treated as a television movie. Baird also appeared in the television drama movie Conviction and in a 2006 episode of the American police mystery drama Justice as Linda Wallis.

In 2007, Baird was cast in a main role in the fourth season of the Primetime Emmy-nominated American TV show The 4400. She appeared in her first episode ("The Wrath of Graham") on 17 June 2007 as Meghan Doyle. After the broadcast of season 4, the show was unexpectedly cancelled.

After a year's hiatus, Baird starred in the 2009 Australian comedy sci-fi film Alien Trespass. Entertainment Weekly described Baird's main character, Tammy, as someone who "thinks on her feet". Baird appeared at WonderCon in 2009 to talk about the film.

In 2012, Baird appeared in the guest role of Mikki in American television series GCB.

In 2013, Baird was cast in Bevan Lee's Australian television drama A Place to Call Home as Regina Standish, initially intended as a guest role. She made her first appearance in the episode "Cane Toad", which was awarded an Australian Cinematographers Society Award of Distinction. She subsequently appeared in five episodes, before returning in season two as a recurring character. Following the second season, the series was cancelled by the Seven Network, however, a third season was produced and aired on Foxtel. It premiered in 2015 with Baird returning to the show as a main character. The same year, Baird appeared on the TV Week list of 'The Top 10 Aussie Villains'.

After starring in 2015 Australian thriller/mystery drama film Backtrack, Baird resumed her role in A Place to Call Home when the series was renewed for a fourth season. It premiered in September 2016. Her portrayal of Regina Standish earned Baird a 2016 Silver Logie Award nomination for Most Outstanding Supporting Actress. The same year, Baird appeared on the cover of the Australian newspaper The Guide, in an article titled "How costumes complete A Place to Call Home". The show was renewed yet again, and a fifth series began filming in February 2017, airing that same year.

While working on A Place to Call Home Baird also appeared on an episode of Doctor Doctor as Hilda. Her most recent credits include playing Rhea Bowden in psychological drama thriller series The Secrets She Keeps (2020), Diane Lawson in The Twelve (2022), Susan Stirling in crime series Return to Paradise and Dana Hanlon in drama series Plum (both 2024).

== Personal life ==
Baird is married to Australian screenwriter and director, Michael Petroni, who she met when she was working in the United States. Together they have two children – a son and a daughter.

Baird has publicly stated that she supported Hillary Clinton in the United States presidential election of 2016.

== Filmography ==
=== Film ===
Year	Title	Role	Notes
1999	I Promise		Short film
2005	Amorality Tale	Roz	Short film
2007	Love Is Love	Sabrina	Short film
2009	Alien Trespass	Tammy	
2015	Backtrack	Carol Bower	

=== Television ===
Year	Title	Role	Notes
2000	Metropolis	Charlotte	TV film
2001	Water Rats	Jedda Simpson	Episode: "Bitter Legacy"
2001	Crash Palace	Chris Sandford	Main role
2001–2004	All Saints	Paula Morgan	Regular role
2005	Conviction		TV film
2005	Global Frequency	Dr. Katrina 'Kate' Finch	Unsold TV pilot
2006	Justice	Linda Wallis	Episode: "Wrongful Death"
2007	The 4400	Meghan Doyle	Regular role
2012	GCB	Mikki	Episode: "Pilot"
2013–2017	A Place to Call Home	Regina Standish	Main role (seasons 1–5)
2017	Doctor Doctor	Hilda	Episode: "Both Sides Now"
2020	The Secrets She Keeps	Rhea Bowden	6 episodes
2022	The Twelve	Diane Lawson	10 episodes
2024	Return to Paradise	Susan Stirling	1 episode
2024	Plum	Dana Hanlon	6 episodes
