= Tim Draxl =

Australian actor and singer

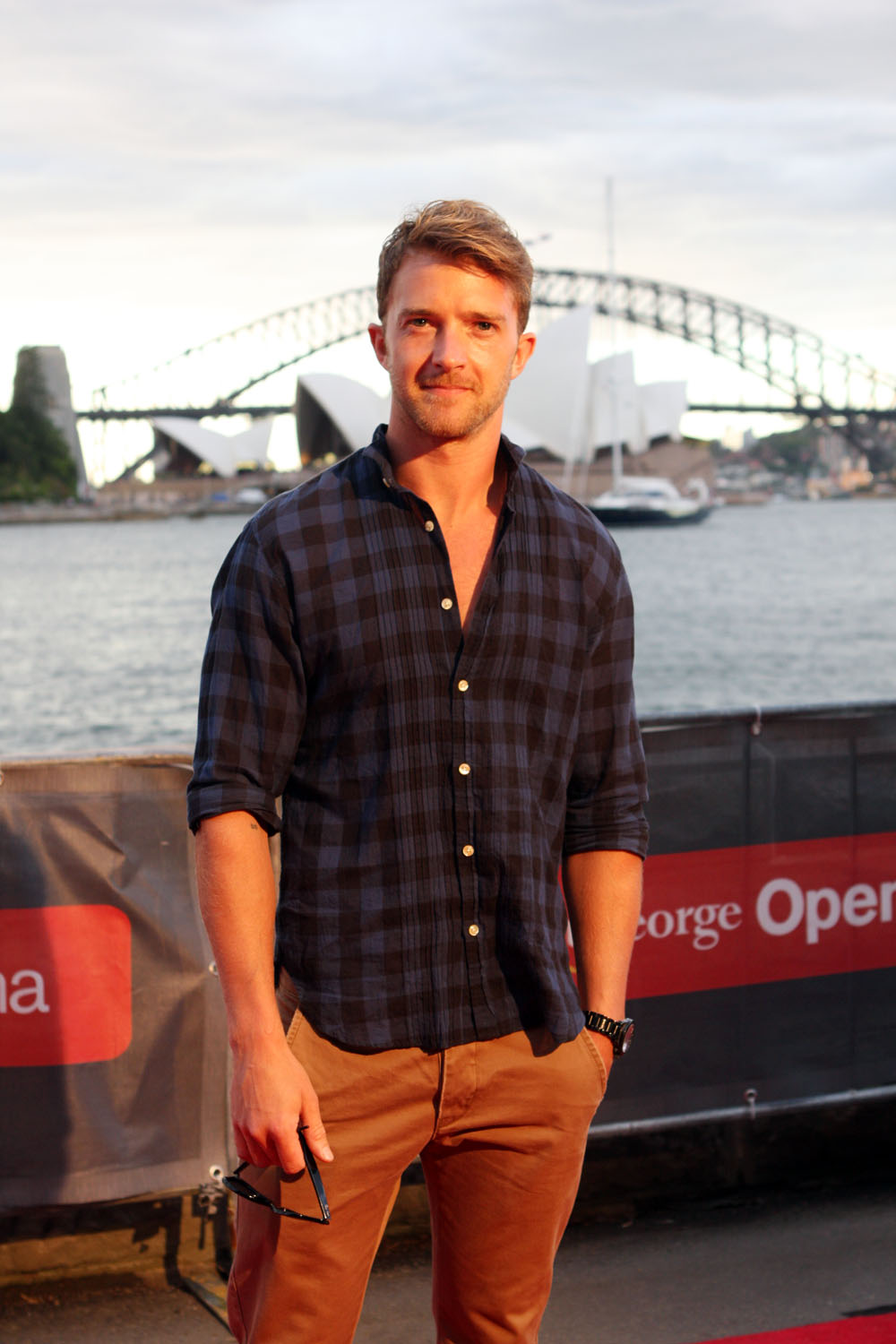
- Tim Draxl in January 2012
- Born: 8 October 1981 (age 45); Sydney, New South Wales, Australia
- Occupation: Actor
- Years active: 2003–present

Tim Draxl (born 8 October 1981) is an Australian actor and singer, known for his role as Doctor Henry Fox in A Place to Call Home.

== Early life ==
Draxl was born in Sydney and grew up in Jindabyne where his family was in the ski industry. He also spent winters in Austria. He attended high school at the McDonald College of Performing Arts. Draxl is openly gay.

== Career ==
Draxl's film roles include Swimming Upstream (2003), In My Sleep (2010) and A Few Best Men (2011). He was nominated for a Logie Award for Most Outstanding Actor in 2004 for the ABC miniseries The Shark Net. Other television roles include in Supernova, Tangle, Serangoon Road, Mrs Biggs, Molly and A Place to Call Home.

Draxl has been referred to as "easily our [Australia's] best cabaret artist" His performance Tim Draxl in Concert was nominated for a Helpmann Award for Best Live Music Presentation in 2002.

Draxl appeared in ABC musical drama In Our Blood.

== Filmography ==
=== Film ===
Year	Title	Role	Notes
2003	Swimming Upstream	John Fingleton	
2004	Right Here Right Now	Ed	
2006	The Deal	Dan	(Short)
2008	Red Canyon	Devon	
2010	Undocumented	William	
2010	In My Sleep	Justin	
2010	Ivory	Andreas	
2011	A Few Best Men	Luke	
2018	Guardians of the Tomb	Andrew	
2022	Blacklight	Drew Hawthorne	

=== TV ===
Year	Title	Role	Notes
2003	The Shark Net		(TV Mini-series)
2005	Dynasty: The Making of a Guilty Pleasure	Joe	(TV Movie)
2005–06	Supernova	Prof. Mike French	(TV Series), 12 episodes
2006	Headland	Kieran Bale	(TV Series), 9 episodes
2010	Tangle	Conrad Doyle	(TV Series), 4 episodes
2010	Day One		(TV Movie)
2011	Crownies	Rob Santangelo	(TV Series), 1 episode: "Episode #1.10"
2012	Mrs Biggs	Craig	(TV Mini-Series), 2 episodes: "Episode #1.4" and "Episode #1.5"
2012	Miss Fisher's Murder Mysteries	Simon Abrahams	(TV Series), 1 episode: "Raisins and Almonds"
2013	Serangoon Road	Stuart Anderson	(TV Series), 1 episode: "Episode #1.8"
2015–18	A Place to Call Home	Dr. Henry Fox	(TV Series), 40 episodes
2016	Molly	Karl	(TV Mini-Series), 1 episode: "Episode #1.2"
2019	Reef Break	Thomas Freeman	(TV Series), 1 episode: "Blue Skies"
2020	The Newsreader	Adam Lyndell	(TV Series) 2 episodes
2022	Summer Love	Luke	1 episode
2023	In Our Blood	David Westford	4 episodes
2023	Last King of the Cross	Detective Donnolly	1 episode
2023	Erotic Stories	Jet	1 episode (Bound)

== Discography ==
=== Albums ===
List of albums, with Australian chart positions
Title	Album details	Peak chart positions
Title	Album details	AUS
Ordinary Miracles	Released: April 1999; Label: Columbia (494292.2)	63
Insongniac	Released: 2001; Label: Columbia (50130720004)	-
Live at the Supper Club	Released: March 2010; Label: Your Management International (YMI200); Notes: Recorded at the Supper Club, Sydney in August 1999	-
My Funny Valentine	Released: 2012; Label: Fanfare Records (FANFARE088)	-

== Theatre credits ==
- Only Heaven Knows (as Cliff), 2017 Hayes Theatre, Sydney
- Jagged Little Pill (as Steve), 2022 Theatre Royal, Sydney
- Sunset Boulevard (as Joe Gillis), 2024 Princess Theatre, Melbourne and Sydney Opera House
- The Glass Menagerie (as Tom Wingfield), 2026 Southbank Theatre, Melbourne

== Awards ==
=== Mo Awards ===
The Australian Entertainment Mo Awards (commonly known informally as the Mo Awards), were annual Australian entertainment industry awards. They recognise achievements in live entertainment in Australia from 1975 to 2016.

Year	Nominee / work	Award	Result (wins only)
1998	Tim Draxl	Johnny O'Keefe Encouragement Award	Won
