= Trent Atkinson =

Australian actor

Trent Atkinson is an Australian-born actor, writer and director.

== Early life ==
The youngest of four children, Trent grew up in the town of Kingscliff on the far north coast of NSW. After appearances in shows such as Paradise Beach as a teenager, he moved to Sydney immediately after graduating high school to pursue his performing career.

== Training ==
Told he was too young for NIDA as a 17-year-old, Trent began studying with the Australian Theatre for Young People. In 1996 he received their annual Lend Lease scholarship which took him to New York to study acting at the Atlantic Theatre Company where he trained under instructors including David Mamet, William H. Macy and Felicity Huffman.

== Acting ==
After being seen in a performance at ATYP, Trent was cast as the titular lead in Storm Boy in a national tour by Bell Shakespeare Company. This was followed by being chosen for the lead role of Dud in the feature film Terra Nova, which won awards at Edinburgh Film Festival and Montreal World Film Festival. The next ten years would see him take a number of film, television and stage roles, including starring in Water Rats, All Saints, Out in the Open, Lower Depths at the Sydney Theatre Company, and PAN at the Capitol Theatre in Sydney among others. In Australia he is perhaps best known for playing autistic schoolboy Mikey Dunn in the Australian soap opera Home and Away. While continuing to perform in film and television, his work as an actor became secondary to what was becoming a full-time writing career.

== Writing ==
A self-taught screenwriter, Trent sold his first attempt at feature film writing to a British Production Company, Midsummer Films. At around this time, Trent also began writing for television, parlaying his acting work on "Home and Away" into writing for the show. His extensive television credits include Home and Away, Headland and All Saints. 2009 saw him pen the award-winning "Chocolate Face" and "Cat & Mouse", both of which he directed. In 2012, Trent was brought in as lead writer on A Place to Call Home and would go on to write six of the first thirteen episodes.

== Select filmography ==
- "A Place to Call Home" (2012)
- "Veneer" (2011)
- Off The Beat (2010)
- Dream The Life (2009)
- Home and Away (2002, 2003, 2017–Present)
- Garage Days (2002)
- Backberner (2002)
- Water Rats (2001)
- Terra Nova (1999)
