= Mark Joffe =

Australian film and television director

- Born: Mark Joffe; 1956 (age 69–70); Polotsk, Byelorussian SSR, USSR, now Belarus
- Occupations: Film director, producer
- Years active: 1981–present

Mark Joffe (born 1956) is an Australian film and television director and producer. He is known for feature films including Grievous Bodily Harm, Spotswood (released internationally as The Efficiency Expert), Cosi, The Matchmaker, The Man Who Sued God, and the documentary Working Class Boy. His television credits include The Great Bookie Robbery, Boy Soldiers, Jack Irish, A Place to Call Home, The Twelve, Halifax, and Lindy Chamberlain: The True Story.

== Career ==
Joffe began his career in Australian television at Crawford Productions, working on series including The Sullivans, Carson's Law, Special Squad and Neighbours.

In 1985, he directed and co-produced the documentary The Life in a Day of Barry Humphries, which was broadcast on the Seven Network and followed the Australian performer Barry Humphries.

His early feature film work included Grievous Bodily Harm (1987), a psychological thriller marking his transition from television to feature filmmaking.

His breakthrough as a director came with the mini-series The Great Bookie Robbery (1986), which won the Australian Film Institute (AFI) Award for Best Mini-Series, with Joffe (shared with Marcus Cole) receiving the AFI Award for Best Direction in a Mini-Series.

He achieved wider recognition with Spotswood (1992), starring Anthony Hopkins and Toni Collette. Released internationally as The Efficiency Expert, the film received overseas distribution.

He followed with Cosi (1996), adapted from the play by Louis Nowra, and The Matchmaker (1997), starring Janeane Garofalo.

His later feature The Man Who Sued God (2001), starring Billy Connolly and Judy Davis, was released internationally and noted for its satirical premise.

In 2018, Joffe directed Working Class Boy, a documentary based on the memoir and stage show of musician Jimmy Barnes.

Joffe also directed the telemovie Boy Soldiers (1990), which received international recognition, including the Liv Ullmann Peace Prize at the Chicago International Film Festival and a nomination for an International Emmy Award.

His later television work includes directing episodes of Jack Irish, A Place to Call Home, The Twelve, Halifax, and the documentary series Lindy Chamberlain: The True Story (2020).

== Critical reception ==
Joffe's work has received sustained critical attention across Australian and international publications.

Reviewing Spotswood, David Stratton described it as "a very Australian, very dry, very amusing film". Stephen Holden in The New York Times noted its "gentle humour" and "offbeat charm". Variety described it as an "engaging" comedy with "assured direction and strong performances".

Cosi was praised for its tone and performances, with Paul Byrnes writing that it had "likeable humour, appealing characters and a compassionate heart".

Reviewing The Matchmaker, Roger Ebert wrote that the film "has a certain sweetness and good humour", while the Los Angeles Times described it as "a thoroughly charming romantic comedy".

The Man Who Sued God was described by Philip French in The Observer as an "amusing and intriguing" film.

Working Class Boy was described by Luke Buckmaster as "heartfelt" and handled with restraint.

Reviewing Lindy Chamberlain: The True Story for The Australian, Graeme Blundell wrote that it was "the first to truly reveal the woman at its centre", adding that the series "cleans up much of the messiness" surrounding the case and remains "profoundly unsettling".

Writing in The Sydney Morning Herald, the series was described as a "clear-eyed retelling" that avoids sensationalism and foregrounds the human consequences of the case.

ABC commentary described the documentary as a "measured and sobering account" that allows the facts to speak for themselves.

== Awards and nominations ==
- Australian Academy of Cinema and Television Arts Awards (AACTA / AFI Awards)
  - 1987 – Best Direction in a Mini-Series, The Great Bookie Robbery (winner)
  - 1992 – AFI Awards – multiple nominations for Spotswood (including Best Film)
  - 1996 – AFI Awards – nominations for Cosi (including Best Film)
  - 2018 – AACTA Awards – Best Documentary (for Working Class Boy) (nominee)
  - 2020 – AACTA Awards – Best Documentary or Factual Program (for Lindy Chamberlain: The True Story) (nominee)
- Chicago International Film Festival
  - Liv Ullmann Peace Prize – Boy Soldiers (winner)
- International Emmy Awards
  - Nomination – Boy Soldiers

== Filmography ==
=== Film ===
- Grievous Bodily Harm (1987)
- Spotswood / The Efficiency Expert (1992)
- Cosi (1996)
- The Matchmaker (1997)
- The Man Who Sued God (2001)
- Working Class Boy (2018)

=== Television and documentary ===
- The Sullivans
- Carson's Law
- The Life in a Day of Barry Humphries (1985)
- The Great Bookie Robbery (1986)
- Boy Soldiers (1990)
- Halifax
- A Place to Call Home
- Jack Irish (2016–2021)
- The Twelve
- Lindy Chamberlain: The True Story (2020)
