= Katherine Thomson (Australian writer) =

Australian playwright and screenwriter

- Born: 1955 (age 70–71); Sydney, New South Wales, Australia
- Occupations: Dramatist and scriptwriter

Katherine Thomson is an Australian playwright and screenwriter born in Sydney, New South Wales in 1955.

== Life and career ==
Katherine Thomson was born in Manly, New South Wales and began her theatrical involvement as a teenager with the Australian Theatre for Young People. She helped found Theatre South in Wollongong and acted in many of their productions.

Her first work was A Change in the Weather, which was followed by Tonight We Anchor in Twofold Bay. Both works were performed in Wollongong in the early 1980s, while the latter was also staged at the Sydney Theatre Company's Wharf Studio. Her next play, A Sporting Chance, was commissioned by the Magpie Theatre Company in South Australia in 1987. It was succeeded by Darlinghurst Nights, developed from the light verse of the noted Australian poet Kenneth Slessor and it was presented, along with musical accompaniment, by the Sydney Theatre Company in 1988.

In 1991, Diving for Pearls premiered at the Melbourne Theatre Company, with Peter Cummins in the role of Den. Later the same year, Belvoir Street Theatre in Sydney produced the play with Robyn Nevin as Barbara and Marshall Napier as Den. Other productions have taken place in Adelaide, Wollongong, Newcastle and Penrith and the play was awarded the Victorian Premier's Literary Award.

Barmaids was first performed by Deckchair Theatre Company in Fremantle, Western Australia in 1991 and at Belvoir Street Theatre in 1992. It has since been performed across the eastern states and in New Zealand. As writer in residence for the Sydney Theatre Company in 1995, Thomson wrote Fragments of Hong Kong and in 1997 a production of Navigating, directed by Richard Wherrett, with Jacki Weaver as Bea, was staged by the Queensland and Melbourne Theatre companies. The following year, the Sydney Theatre Company presented a production of this play directed by Marion Potts, featuring Noni Hazelhurst in the central role.

In 2007, King Tide was premiered by Griffin Theatre Company, in a production directed by Patrick Nolan, starring Toni Scanlan.

Thomson has written for a number of television series, including Wildside, Halifax f.p., Fallen Angels, G. P. and Mirror, Mirror. She received an AWGIE Award for an episode of GP and an AFI nomination for an episode of Halifax f.p. She has also served as a member of the board of the Sydney Theatre Company for a number of years.
