= David Berry (actor) =

Australian actor

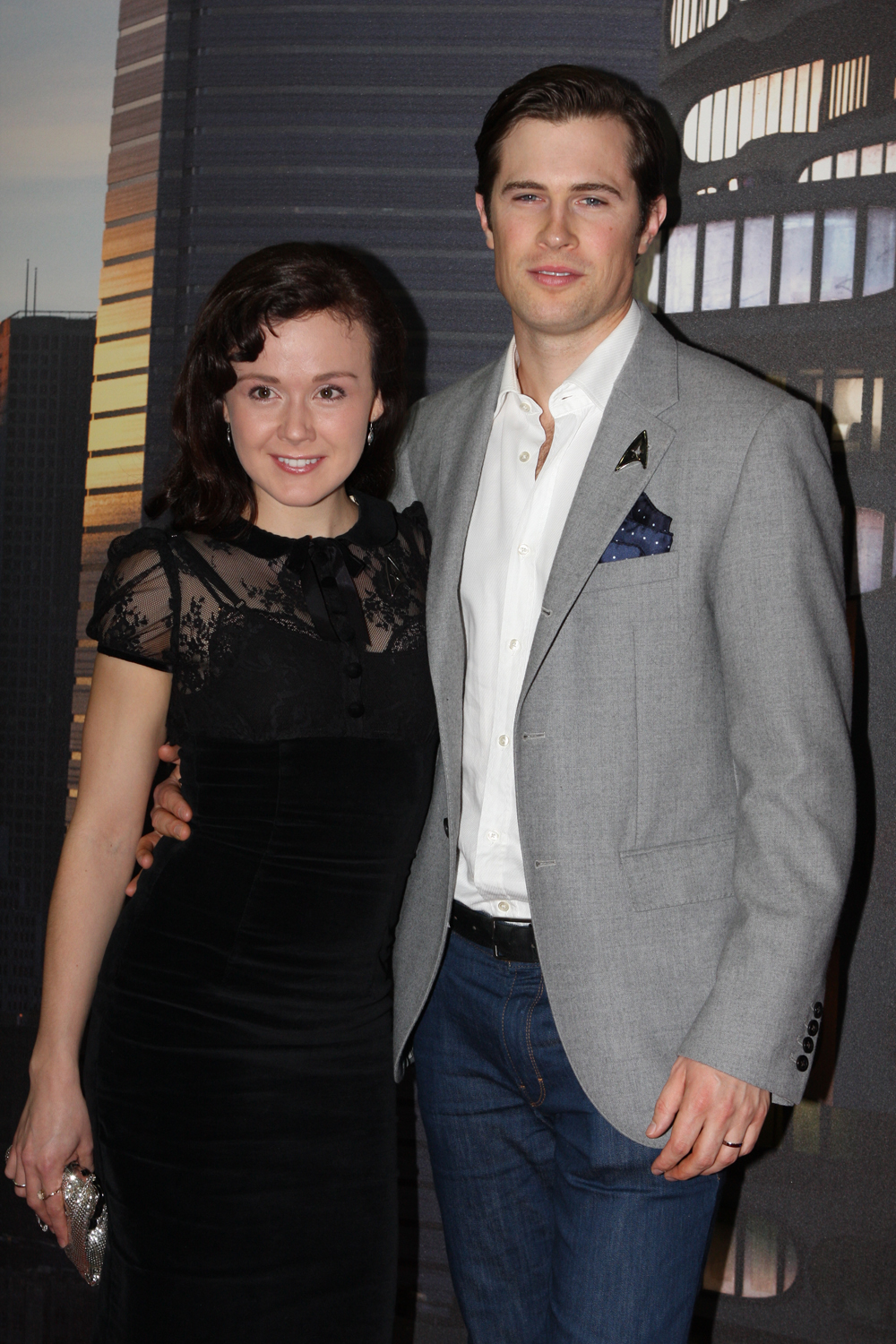
- Berry (right) in 2013
- Occupation: Actor
- Years active: 2012–present
- Notable credits: A Place To Call Home; Outlander
- Spouse: Kristina Tesic (m. 2012; div. 2022)
- Children: 1

David Berry is an Australian actor known for playing James Bligh in A Place To Call Home and Lord John Grey in Outlander.

== Early life ==
One of four children, Berry is talented in both singing and the violin. As a child, he attended school on a scholarship for voice, splitting his time between school and professional performances that included work at Opera Australia and numerous festivals. In 2002, he received a scholarship to study political science at Montreal's McGill University, where he earned a B.A. in Political Sciences and Cultural Studies. Returning to Australia, he began his Masters in Media Practice at the University of Sydney, while also working as a researcher in the newsroom for Channel Seven. Shortly after, he decided to abandon a career in media and return to his true passion, the performing arts. He applied and was accepted to the Australian National Institute of Dramatic Art (NIDA), from which he graduated in 2010.

== Career ==
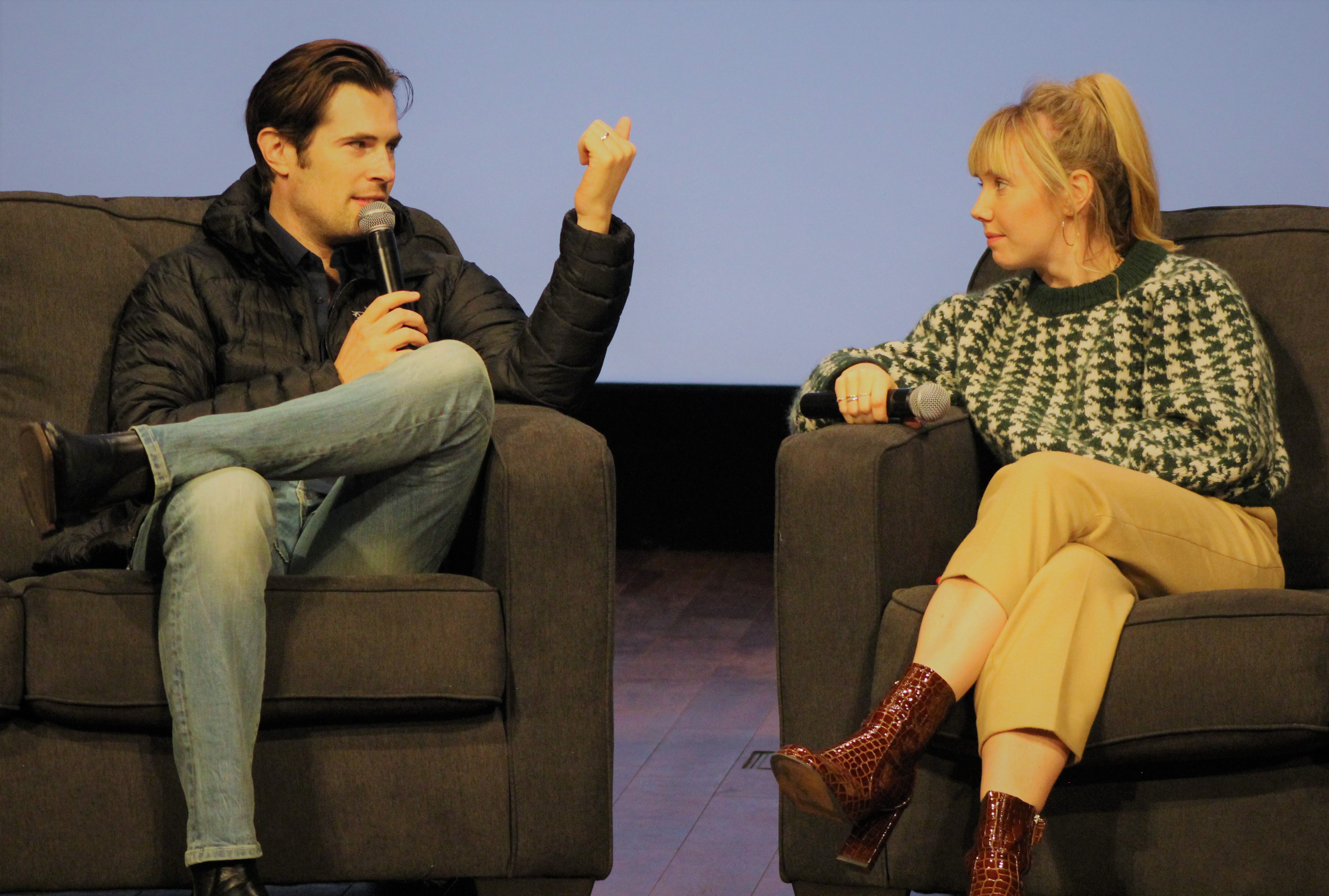
David Berry (L) and Lauren Lyle (R) answer fan questions during their panel at the Sasnak City Outlander convention on 17 November 2018.

Berry's first professional role was a guest appearance in an episode of Miss Fisher's Murder Mysteries. He went on that same year to portray Logan Meyer in a ten episode stint on 7 Network's long running soap opera Home and Away.

In 2013, Berry starred in writer/director Robert White's made for TV horror film, Progeny. He also joined the main cast of the Foxtel drama A Place To Call Home as James Bligh, a man tortured by society's treatment of his homosexuality, in 1950s Australia.

In 2015, Berry starred as Brian Cleaver in The Crater: A True Story of Vietnam. The film revolves around the experiences of Cleaver during The Battle of Coral-Balmoral, fought between May 12 and June 6, 1968.

In August 2016, it was announced that Berry would be joining the cast of Starz's time travel period drama Outlander, in the recurring role of Lord John Grey. He debuted in the 2017 episode "All Debts Paid", appearing in seasons three through eight.

In 2020, Berry teamed with fellow actor Tim Downie for an unofficial Outlander podcast entitled Outcasts.

== Filmography ==
=== Television ===
Year	Title	Character	Production	Notes
2012	Miss Fisher's Murder Mysteries	Alastair	ABC	Episode: "Murder on the Ballarat Train"
2012	Home and Away	Logan Meyer	7 Network	10 episodes
2013	Progeny	Damien	Wagsword Entertainment	Television film
2013–18	A Place to Call Home	James Bligh	Foxtel	Main role, (season 1-4, 6)
2017–26	Outlander	Lord John Grey	Starz	Main role (season 3-8)
2022	Riptide	Dan Burrell / Simon Cameron		4 episodes

=== Film ===
Year	Title	Character	Notes
2015	The Crater: A True Story of Vietnam	Brian Cleaver	Based upon the story of Brian Cleaver at the Battle of Coral-Balmoral.

=== Theatre ===
Year	Title	Role	Director	Theatre
2010	Lost Illusions	Lucien Chardon	Ian Sinclair	NIDA
2010	Medea Material	Jason	Kat Henry	NIDA
2010	Assassins	John Wilkes Booth	Tony Knight	NIDA
2011	Men Without Shadows	Jeanie	Hendrik Elstein	Sly Rat / NIDA
2011	A Little Touch of Chaos	Arthur	James Millar/Peter Rutherford	Grant Street Theatre
2015	Of Thee I Sing	Wintergreen	Jay James-Moody	Sydney Opera House

== Awards and nominations ==
Year	Award	Category	Nominated work	Result
2016	Logie Awards	Most Outstanding Supporting Actor	A Place to Call Home	Nominated

== Personal life ==
Berry married Kristina Tesic in 2012. They divorced in 2022. They had a son in 2016.
