= Arianwen Parkes-Lockwood =

Australian actress and producer (born 1987)

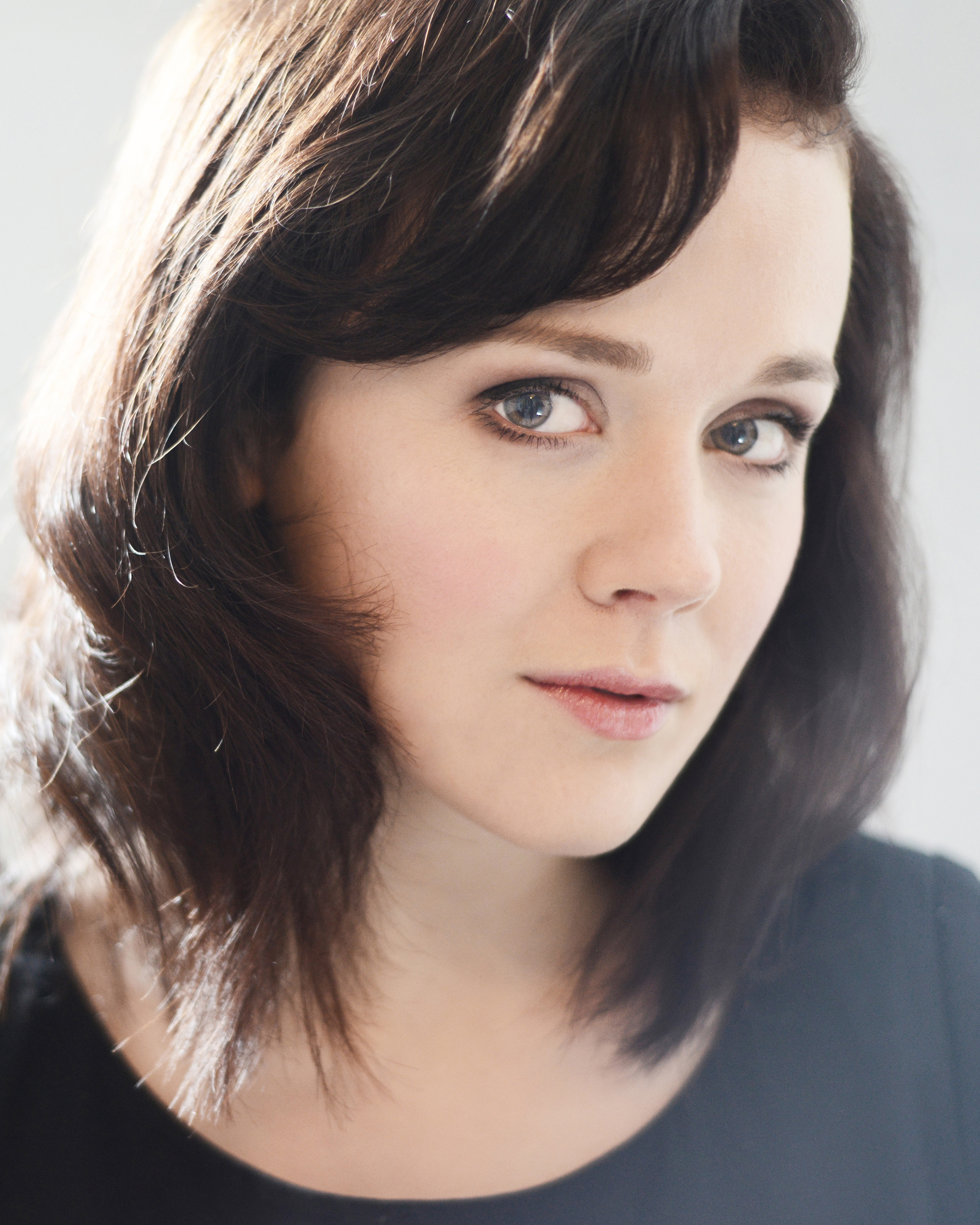
- Parkes-Lockwood in 2013
- Born: 24 July 1987 (age 39)
- Occupations: Actress, producer
- Years active: 2010–present
- Known for: A Place to Call Home
- Children: 1

Arianwen Parkes-Lockwood (born 24 July 1987) is an Australian actress and producer.

== Early life ==
Arianwen lived in the small rural area of Black Mountain in the New England Region of New South Wales. She attended Newling Public School and Duval High School in Armidale. She went on to study a Bachelor of Dramatic Art (Acting) at the National Institute of Dramatic Art (NIDA), graduating in 2008.

== Career ==
After graduating from NIDA, Parkes-Lockwood played Abigail in The Crucible for the Sydney Theatre Company. She also starred in a 2010 Sydney production As You Like It, playing Rosalind.

She appeared as Dolly Green in the 2011 television series Underbelly: Razor; then in an episode of Tough Nuts (2011) as well as an episode of the two-part BBC docudrama The Kangaroo Gang: Thieves by Appointment (2011).

She was a winner of the 2011 Marten Bequest Travelling Scholarship for acting and filmmaking.

In 2013, she was cast as Olivia Bligh in the Seven Network's 1950s period drama A Place to Call Home in which she appeared for 61 episodes, until 2018. In 2015 she had a guest role as Harriet Edwards in ABC Television's Miss Fisher's Murder Mysteries.

Parkes-Lockwood is also a successful voiceover artist, having voiced television commercials for Renault Arkana, LG, Chemist Warehouse, BBC Earth, Nurofen, Manicare, Elastoplast and Magnum.

In 2019, she appeared naked in a video for PETA's anti-wool campaign.

== Filmography ==
=== Film ===
Year	Title	Role	Note
2011	The Filmmaker	Teenage Jess (also Producer & Assistant Director)	Short film
2011	Rosey and Me	Rosey	Short film
2011	Gallery		Short film
2012	May	Emma	Short film
2016	A Grape Family Adventure	Voice (also Producer & Art Director)	Animated short film

=== Television ===
Year	Title	Role	Note
2011	Tough Nuts: Australia's Hardest Criminals	Marlene McPherson	season 1, episode 8: "Lennie McPherson: Mr Big"
2011	The Kangaroo Gang: Thieves by Appointment	Fiona	episode 1: "King of Thieves"
2011	Underbelly: Razor	Dolly Green	4 episodes
2013–18	A Place to Call Home	Olivia Bligh / Samantha Swanson	Main role
2015	Miss Fisher's Murder Mysteries	Harriet Edwards	TV series, 1 episode
2019	PETA Anti-Wool Campaign	Self	Video

== Audiobook narration ==
- The Barbershop Girl by Georgina Penney
- Bridget Crack by Rachel Leary
- The Sister's Song by Louise Allan
- Islands by Peggy Frew
- How to Be Thin in a World of Chocolate by Michael Connolly
- The Fence by Meredith Jaffé
- Michelle de Kretser on Shirley Hazzard by Michelle de Kretser
- Eight Lives by Susan Hurley
- Blackwater by Jacqueline Ross
- The Safe House by Cameron Ward
- Bennelong and Phillip by Kate Fullagar
- Sisters in Captivity by Colin Burgess
- Suitcase of Dreams by Tania Blanchard
- Her Sunburnt County by Deborah FitzGerald
- Letters from Berlin by Tania Blanchard
- The Lost Love Song by Minnie Darke
- The Girl from Munich by Tania Blanchard
- Paris Dreaming by Katrina Lawrence
- Echo Lake by Joan Sauers
- Whisky Valley by Joan Sauers
- The Lace Weaver by Lauren Chater
- The Forgotten Letters of Esther Durrant by Kayte Nunn
- Two Steps Onward by Anne Buist & Graeme Simsion
- Two Steps Forward by Anne Buist & Graeme Simsion
- Daughter of Calabria by Tania Blanchard
- Star-Crossed by Minnie Darke
- Wifedom by Anna Funder
- My Brilliant Sister by Amy Brown

== Theatre ==
Year	Title	Role	Note
2005	Hamlet		Bondi Pavilion, Sydney with The Shakespeare Globe Centre Australia
2008	The Crucible	Abigail	Wharf Theatre with Sydney Theatre Company
2010	As You Like It	Rosalind	199 Cleveland Street Theatre, Sydney

== Personal life ==
Parkes-Lockwood is married to writer and voiceover artist Marcello Fabrizi, and together they have a daughter, Serafina, who was born on Christmas Eve, 2017. She encourages people to remove the stigma around miscarriage and talk openly about it, having experienced one herself, prior to having her daughter.

Parkes-Lockwood is vegan.
