= Abby Earl =

Australian actress

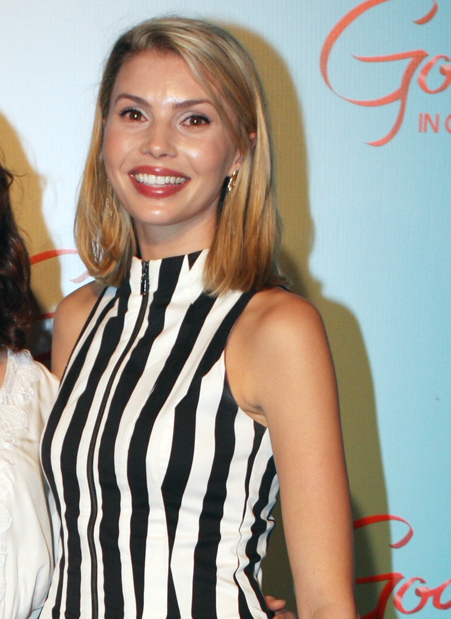
- Abby Earl in 2013
- Born: 15 February 1989 (age 37); Broulee, New South Wales
- Occupation: Actress
- Known for: A Place To Call Home
- Television: Underbelly; Love My Way

Abby Earl (born 15 February 1989) is an Australian actress, known for her role as Anna Bligh in the television drama A Place to Call Home.

== Early life ==
Earl was born and raised in Broulee, New South Wales. At age 15, she auditioned for Newtown High School of the Performing Arts. She was accepted and subsequently relocated to Sydney to attend the school.

She graduated from Western Australian Academy of Performing Arts at Edith Cowan University in Perth.

== Career ==
Earl's first role was a guest part in Fox8 drama series Love My Way in 2007. In 2012 she had another guest role on an episode of the fifth season of the Underbelly franchise, Underbelly: Badness. The same year, she featured as Diana in the made for television crime film The Great Mint Swindle, alongside Grant Bowler and Todd Lasance.

In 2013, Earl started playing Anna Bligh in post-war drama series A Place to Call Home, a part she starred in from seasons 1 through 6. She was nominated for Most Popular New Talent at the 2014 Logie Awards for the role.

She has also featured in several short films, the most recent being Sweet Tooth in 2019, which was narrated by Cate Blanchett.

== Filmography ==
=== Television ===
Name	Year	Character	Notes
2007	Love My Way	Chloe	Season 3, episode 3: "Say What You Mean"
2012	Underbelly: Badness	Karina	Episode: "Thy Will Be Done"
2013–2018	A Place to Call Home	Miss Anna Bligh (Seasons 1–2) Mrs Anna Poletti (Season 2 finale – Series finale)	Seasons 1–6, 67 episodes Nominated for Logie Award for Most Popular New Talent in 2014

=== Film ===
Name	Year	Character	Notes
2010	Bella the Ballerina	Cinderella	Short film
2012	Carnations	Waitress	Short film
2011	Bonsai		Short film
2012	The Great Mint Swindle	Diana	TV movie
2017	Kill Off	Emma	Short film
2019	Sweet Tooth	The Mother	Short film

== Awards ==
Year	Work	Award	Category	Result
2014	A Place to Call Home	Logie Award	Most Popular New Talent	Nominated
2014	A Place to Call Home	Equity Ensemble Awards	Outstanding Performance by an Ensemble in a Drama Series	Nominated

== Personal life ==
Earl is mother to twins that she shares with the British writer and musician, Christopher Unwin.
