= Bevan Lee =

Australian writer and executive (born 1950)

Bevan Lee OAM
- Born: Bevan John Lee; 7 November 1950 (age 76); Western Australia, Australia
- Occupations: Writer; producer; actor; teacher
- Years active: 1978–present
- Known for: Full list

Bevan John Lee OAM (born 7 November 1950) is an Australian writer and executive best known for creating the TV dramas All Saints, Packed to the Rafters, Winners & Losers and A Place to Call Home.

== Career ==
Lee was an actor before turning to writing, working his way up to be script producer of the TV serial Sons and Daughters. He also rewrote the first episode of Home and Away, a show which he has script produced at various stages over the years. Lee was network script executive at Channel Nine for eight years in the 1990s before returning to Channel Seven, where he took part in the creation and development of such series as All Saints, Always Greener, Marshall Law and headLand, forming a notable creative partnership with Seven's head of network drama John Holmes. He also created 2012's A Place to Call Home, and the 2020 series Between Two Worlds for Seven.

== Personal life ==
Lee is gay and in 2007 he was nominated as one of the 25 most influential lesbian and gay people in Australia by online digital media site SameSame.

== Filmography ==
=== Television ===
The numbers in writing credits refer to the number of episodes.

Title	Year	Credited as		Network	Notes
Title	Year	Creator	Writer	Network	Notes
Secret Valley	1980	No	Yes (1)	ABC	
Sons and Daughters	1982–87	No	Yes (118)	Seven Network	Script editor (1982: 171 episodes)
Prisoner	1985–86	No	Yes (8)	Network 10	Story editor (1985–86; 70 episodes); Storyline (1985–86; 41 episodes)
A Country Practice	1986	No	Yes (1)	Seven Network	
Home and Away	1988–2011	No	Yes (30)	Seven Network	Writer (1988–2008); Story editor (1988-89: 118 episodes); Script producer (1989–2011)
Family and Friends	1990	No	Yes	Nine Network	Unknown episodes
The Flying Doctors	1991	No	Yes (5)	Nine Network	Story editor (7 episodes)
The Adventures of Skippy	1992–93	No	Yes (5)	Nine Network	
Ship to Shore	1993	No	No	ABC	Producer (2 episodes)
Spellbinder	1995	No	No	Nine Network	Script consultant
Halifax f.p.	1995–96	No	No	Nine Network	Script executive (4 episodes)
All Saints	1998–2009	Yes	Yes (4)	Seven Network	
Always Greener	2001–03	Yes	Yes (1)	Seven Network	
Marshall Law	2002–03	Yes	No	Seven Network	
headLand	2005–06	Yes	Yes (1)	Seven Network	
Packed to the Rafters	2008–13	Yes	No	Seven Network	
Winners & Losers	2011–16	Yes	Yes (3)	Seven Network	Producer (1 episode)
A Place to Call Home	2013–18	Yes	Yes (26)	Seven Network	Script producer (2013–14; 18 episodes)
Between Two Worlds	2020	Yes	Yes (4)	Seven Network	
Back to the Rafters	2021	Yes	Yes (3)	Amazon Prime Video	

== Acting credits ==
=== Film ===
Title	Year	Role	Notes
The Bucks Party	1978		Short film
Harlequin	1980	Mr. Robinson	
Touch and Go	1980	Fisherman	

=== Television ===
Title	Year	Role	Notes
Falcon Island	1981	Vim Van Dorn	
