= Olivia Tennet =

New Zealand actress, dancer and choreographer

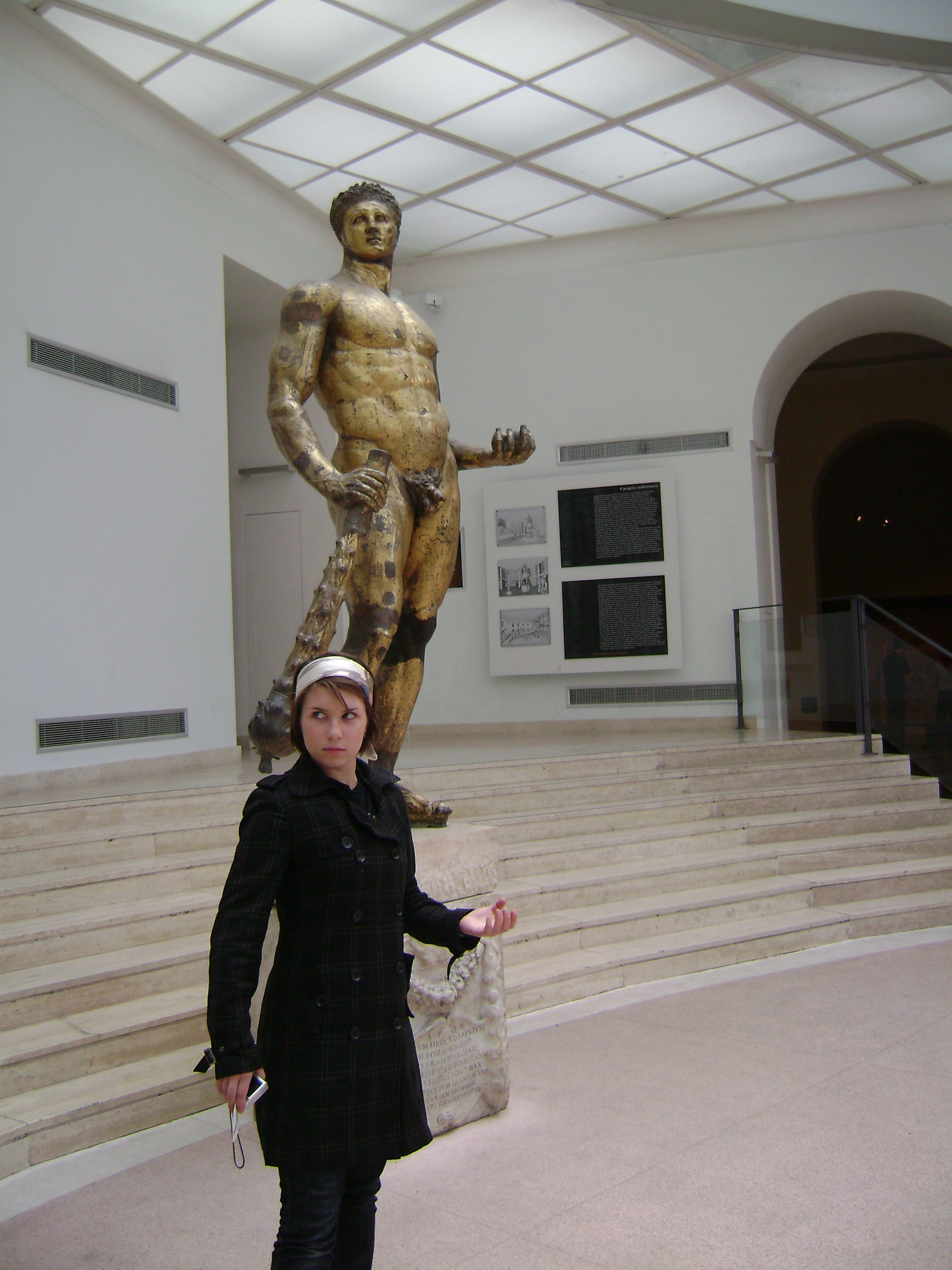
- Tennet in 2008
- Born: 4 January 1991 (age 35); Auckland, New Zealand
- Occupations: Actress, dancer
- Years active: 1999–present
- Spouse: Milo Cawthorne (m. 2013; sep. 2016)
- Partner: Tom Broome
- Children: 1

Olivia Tennet (born 4 January 1991) is a New Zealand actress and dancer best known in her home country for her role as Tuesday Warner on the nightly medical drama Shortland Street, along with several roles in television and theatre. Outside of New Zealand, she is best known for her roles in The Lord of the Rings: The Two Towers (2002), Power Rangers RPM (2009), and the independent film Blood Punch (2013).

== Career ==
Tennet began taking dance lessons at the age of four years following her older sister into dance, eventually stumbling into acting three years later She made her first major television appearance in the fourth season of Xena: Warrior Princess as the runaway Princess Alesia in the episode "If The Shoe Fits...".

Eventually, Tennet made her way into films. She went on to win the "Best Juvenile Performer" award at the Nokia New Zealand Film and TV Awards in 2000, for her role as Nicole Mitchell in Kids World. She also appeared in Peter Jackson's film adaptation of J. R. R. Tolkien's The Lord of the Rings: The Two Towers as Freda, a young girl of Rohan. She then won "Best Actress" at the Drifting Clouds Short Film Festival for her outstanding performance in the short film Watermark, beating the other adult nominees. The film won "Best Film" at the same awards.

Following this, Tennet became part of the core cast for Maddigan's Quest (2006) as Lilith. She then appeared as Tuesday Warner on Shortland Street for 54 episodes during the 2007 and 2008 seasons. She later portrayed the role of teenage genius Dr. K on Power Rangers RPM, the seventeenth season of the Power Rangers series which premiered in March 2009.

Around this time, Tennet competed in the "Sheilah Winn Shakespeare Competition" with classmate Phoebe Mason (Epsom Girls Grammar School Drama Leader 2008) and did quite well, winning four of fifteen awards. The 5-minute performance included various scenes from Macbeth. Tennet and Mason won a trip to the Globe Theatre in London, July 2009, as part of the Young Shakespeare Company.

Since her appearance on Power Rangers RPM, Tennet has participated in various television shows and theatrical productions in New Zealand. She played the role of nurse Lynne in an Auckland Theatre Company production of Stepping Out in June 2010, followed by the role of the Siren Queen for the Wet Hot Beauties' water ballet show titled Sirens for the Auckland Fringe Festival in February 2011. She also helped choreograph the show.

Later on, Tennet made a television appearance in an episode of The Almighty Johnsons as Delphine in March 2011. She also took the stage as Emilia in Peach Theatre Company's production of Othello in July 2011. She then took on the role of Dorothy in a major theatrical production of The Wizard of Oz based on the 1987 musical produced by the Royal Shakespeare Company at the Civic Theatre in September 2011, earning positive reviews for her portrayal of the character.

Before leaving for the United States, she made an appearance on Underbelly NZ: Land of the Long Green Cloud as Julie Theilman, a courier working for Terry Clark of the Mr. Asia drug syndicate.

After wrapping up on The Wizard of Oz, Tennet moved to the United States to film a low-budget independent feature film titled Blood Punch which also featured many of her co-stars from Power Rangers RPM. The film premiered at the 20th Austin Film Festival in late October 2013 and has won many awards and honors in the film festival circuit since then. While in the United States, she also appeared in a web series and did voiceover work before moving back to New Zealand.

Since then, Tennet appeared in the miniseries When We Go To War and the joint Australia-New Zealand TV series 800 Words, along with various stage and voiceover credits. She also produced her own web series of dance videos titled Dancing in Small Spaces on YouTube and Vimeo. In late 2018, Tennet, along with actors Esther Stephens and Aria Jones, formed a 60's doo-wop trio named The Up-Doos who have begun performing in several local Auckland venues.

In 2020, Tennet reprised the role of Dr. K in two episodes of the second season of Power Rangers Beast Morphers.

== Personal life ==
Tennet was born in Auckland, New Zealand. Along with her older sister Emma, Tennet also has an older brother, Anton Tennet, who is also an actor based in Melbourne, Australia.

While living in Los Angeles, California, she married fellow New Zealand actor Milo Cawthorne, with whom she has worked several times in the past, most notably on Power Rangers RPM and more recently on Blood Punch. The couple had been living together in Los Angeles since late 2011 before moving back to New Zealand in late 2013 to begin rehearsals for the Auckland production of 360: A Theatre of Recollections (2014). As of June 2016, the couple had separated. Since then, she has been in a relationship with musician Tom Broome with whom she has a son named Alwyn.

Tennet completed her secondary education at Epsom Girls Grammar School in 2008, shortly before appearing on Power Rangers RPM. She began studying speech therapy at the University of Auckland after moving back to NZ with her then-husband and as of July 2019, she graduated with her bachelor’s degree.

== Filmography ==
=== Film ===
Year	Title	Role	Notes
2001	Kids World	Nicole Mitchell	
2002	Watermark	Megan	Short
2002	The Lord of the Rings: The Two Towers	Freda	
2005	Boogeyman	Terrified Girl	
2001	Ozzie	Karen	
2012	The Swarming	Julie	Short
2013	Home	Olive	Short
2014	Blood Punch	Skyler	
2014	Satisfaction	Nicky	Short
2014	Partiality		Short
2015	Jiwi's Machines	June	Short
2016	Moving	Jess	Short
2017	Gary of the Pacific	House Buyer	
2020	This Town	Jasmine	
2020	Baby Done	Beth	
2021	A Love Yarn	Rose O’Doyle	

=== Television ===
Year	Title	Role	Notes
1999	Xena: Warrior Princess	Alesia	Episode: "If the Shoe Fits..."
2003	Lucy	Lucie Arnaz	TV film
2003	P.E.T. Detectives	Helena	Episode: "Fire Starters"
2006	Maddigan's Quest	Lilith	Main role
2007–2008, 2026	Shortland Street	Tuesday Warner	Recurring role
2009	Power Rangers RPM	Dr. K	Main role
2011	The Almighty Johnsons	Delphine Hansen	Episode: "Goddesses, Axl, Come in All Forms"
2011	Underbelly NZ: Land of the Long Green Cloud	Julie Thileman	Episodes: "Trains 'N' Boats 'N' Planes", "All at Sea", "Dominoes"
2013	The Zelfs	Tressa (voice)	TV miniseries
2015	When We Go to War	Lorna	TV miniseries
2015	Funny Girls		TV series
2015–2018	800 Words	Siouxsie	Recurring role
2017	Why Does Love?	Donna	TV film
2018	Kiwi	Dianne	TV film
2018	The Brokenwood Mysteries	Daisy Rose	Episode: "Scared to Death"
2019	Kiri and Lou	Kiri	Voice role
2019	Jandal Burn	Sherri	Voice role
2020	Power Rangers Beast Morphers	Dr. K	Recurring role

=== Voiceover ===
Year	Title	Role	Notes
2003	The Fat Man	Verna Muske	Radio play
2013	Jessica Darling's IT List: The (Totally Not) Guaranteed Guide to Popularity, Prettiness & Perfection	Narrator/Jessica Darling	Audiobook
2013	My Friend Barlow	Finch/Narrator	Interactive storybook

=== Music videos ===
Year	Song	Artist	Role
2008	"Exit Light"	Solomon	Lead
2013	"I Kill Giants"	The Naked and Famous	Dancer/Choreographer
2013	"Apple"	Barnaby Saints	Lead
2018	"100%"	Boycrush	Dancer
2018	"Disappear"	The Miltones	Dancer/Choreographer
2018	"Devil's Work"	Racing	Dancer
2018	"Look Up"	Sorrento ft. Troy Kingi	Dancer/Choreographer

=== Web series ===
Year	Title	Role	Notes
2014	Flat3	Lee	"The White Album"
2014	The Zelfs	Tressa	Web episode: "Bad Hair Day"
2015	Jiwi's Machines	June	
2014–2015	Dancing in Small Spaces	Editor, choreographer	Self-produced web series (11 episodes)
2015	Stake Out	Ganet	"Kids"
2016	Friday Night Bites		"Slutwalk: The Musical"
2021	Talkback	Zoe Williams	TVNZ OnDemand

== Stage ==
Year	Title	Role	Notes
2002	A Midsummer Night's Dream	Puck	Her Primary Schools Senior Production
2005	Les Misérables	Éponine	
2006	Romeo and Juliet	Juliet	
2007	Cabaret	Sally Bowles	
2008	For Today	Sophie	
2008	Children of the Poor	Albany	
2008	A Midsummer Night's Dream	Hermia	
2009	Titus Andronicus	Lavinia	
2009	The Arrival	Workshop/Ensemble	
2009	The Pied Piper of Hamilton	Lead/Various	
2009	Autobahn	Lead	
2009	Twelfth Night	Viola	
2009	Christ Almighty!	Mary	
2010	360	Little Sister	Production for the New Zealand International Arts Festival in Wellington
2010	Stepping Out	Lynne	Production with the Auckland Theatre Company.
2011	Sirens	Siren Queen	Production with the Wet Hot Beauties Ballet Group.
2011	Othello	Emilia	Production with the Peach Theatre Company.
2011	The Wizard of Oz	Dorothy Gale	Production with the Peach Theatre Company.
2014	360 - A Theatre of Recollections	Little Sister	Auckland production
2014	The Man Whose Mother Was A Pirate	Philosopher/Terrible Crabmeat/Ensemble	Auckland Theatre Company production.
2014	Hauraki Horror	Jaime Ridge	The Basement Annual Christmas Show
2015	The Book of Everything	Margot Klopper	Silo Theatre production for the Auckland Arts Festival.
2015	Guys and Dolls	Hotbox Girl	Auckland Theatre Company production.
2015	Jesus Christ Part II	Jesus	The Basement Annual Christmas Show
2016	Mia Blonde in "Ice Dagger"	Mia Blonde	
2016	In Flagrante: The Venus Season	Dancer	Q Theatre, Auckland, NZ
2016	The Opening Night Before Christmas	Self	The Basement Annual Christmas Show
2017	In Flagrante: The Butterfly Club	Dancer	The Butterfly Club, Melbourne, Australia
2017	Pleasuredome: The Musical	Ensemble dancer, understudy for Lilith; Lilith	Replaced Ashleigh Taylor for the role of Lilith
2018	In Flagrante	Dancer	The Butterfly Club, Melbourne, Australia
2018	Mr. Burns: A Post-Electric Play		Silo Theatre

== Other works ==
Year	Title	Role	Notes
2013	I Kill Giants	Choreographer	The Naked and Famous music video
2015	K Rd Stories	Director	"Sugar Hit"
2016	That Bloody Woman	Choreographer	Auckland Theatre Company stage play
2017	As You Like It	Choreographer	University of Auckland Summer Shakespeare 2017 production
2018	Shortland Street: The Musical	Choreographer	Auckland Theatre Company stage play

== Awards and nominations ==
Year	Nominated work	Award	Category	Result
2000	Kids World	Nokia New Zealand Film & Television Awards	Best Juvenile Performer	Won
2003	Watermark	New Zealand Drifting Clouds International Film Festival	Best Actress	Won
2011	The Wizard of Oz	Metro Magazine	Best Arms and Legs Outstretched	Won
2011	The Wizard of Oz	Hackman Theatre Awards	DANZ Award for Best Dancing in a Play	Nominated
2014	Blood Punch	Hoboken International Film Festival	Best Actress	Nominated
