= Blood Punch =

- Film poster
- Directed by: Madellaine Paxson
- Written by: Eddie Guzelian
- Produced by: Fred Schaefer; Fleur Saville; Ethan Pines; Rose McIver
- Starring: Milo Cawthorne; Olivia Tennet; Ari Boyland; Adelaide Kane
- Cinematography: Neil Cervin
- Edited by: Sean Stack
- Music by: Adam Berry
- Production company: Bluff Road Productions
- Release date: October 26, 2013 (Austin Film Festival)
- Running time: 104 minutes
- Country: United States
- Language: English

Blood Punch is a 2013 horror thriller film featuring a time loop, directed by Madellaine Paxson in her directorial debut, and starring Milo Cawthorne, Olivia Tennet, Ari Boyland, and Adelaide Kane. The film had its world premiere on 26 October 2013 at the Austin Film Festival, where it won the Dark Matters Audience Award. The film had a positive critical reception.

== Plot ==
On a Tuesday, Milton awakens in an off-season hunting lodge, goes to the bathroom, and throws up. He finds in the bathtub a note taped to a computer tablet; it says "Play Me Now." It's a video he's already made to advise himself to make an important decision. His video-self chops off two of his fingers with a meat cleaver to establish his earnestness, then explains that they are in a bizarre situation because Milton wanted to impress a woman. Video-Milton says that he must ask himself, "Was she worth it?"

On the previous day, Monday, Milton attends a rehab center after having been caught cooking crystal meth. There he meets the beautiful Skyler, who seduces him into sex and a plan to break out of the facility. She tells him that if he's willing to cook 85 pounds of high-grade meth in one day, they'll make an exorbitant sum of money.

Milton is intimidated by their getaway driver, her psychotic, trigger-happy cop boyfriend Russell, but is game for anything, having fallen in love with Skyler. They drive to a hunting cabin in the woods, where he is astonished by the enormous array of weapons on the walls and lying around the place. Russell demonstrates that he knows more about Milton than he should. When Milton and Skyler reveal their mutual affection, he abuses her and menaces both of them.

Russell tells Milton that they are in a valley which has been cursed by a bloody Native American war. Legend says a vast number of men fought there for months, filling the valley with blood, though a Full Moon appeared in the sky each night. In the end only one warrior remained, without a single enemy - or friend - remaining.

Milton wakes on Tuesday to find himself on the cabin couch, then goes to the bathroom to be sick. Skyler urges him to take Russell's police car and escape the valley, but he refuses. Milton prepares the meth; Russell tries to shoot him afterwards; they fight, and Skyler shoots Russell with a crossbow. That night, beneath the full Moon, Milton buries Russell alive. Then it is Tuesday again, and all three are alive and unharmed. Like Skyler, Milton remembers everything they did, but Russell is cheerfully unaware. In each iteration of the day, they kill Russell with a different weapon in the lodge and try different ways to escape the valley, but with each reset, they are all restored. Mysteriously, a growing number of Russell's corpses daily mount up in the shallow grave. One Tuesday, Skyler shows Milton a place which is littered with his own corpses from times when Russell and Skyler killed him, and he realizes that after being murdered, one does not remember the previous day. Skyler and Milton, studying a scrapbook, try to figure out why the day is recurring. She suggests they are in Hell, but Milton assumes the mystery is geographical.

Skyler and Milton decide to follow the original plan of meeting the meth dealers, Archer and Nabiki. When they hand over the meth and demand the cash, the scene erupts into a double-crossing barrage of gunfire, and they barely escape without the money. They drive away as night falls, but Skyler is bleeding out. Milton has a vision of himself, Russell, and Skyler in a cave. Old cave wall art depicts the aboriginal battle, and Russell repeats that a single warrior remained. When Tuesday recurs, Milton gets into the police car to call up its camera archives. He finds that November 12 has logged nearly 50,000 hours of use, rather than 24 for one day. Cannibalizing the dashboard console's laptop and keypad, he prepares to make the video which Milton will discover at the movie's beginning.

With the critical new clues, Skyler and Milton discuss the legend and its emphasis on blood being spilled in the valley. Old local newspaper clippings report on gangster shootouts, cult suicides, and other doomed societies. Milton pulls a gun on Skyler, saying that the only exit is for one of them to kill the other and emerge the sole victor. Skyler protests that they can stay happy and ageless together, never shedding blood again, but Milton reminds her of Russell. Skyler cooks breakfast while Milton performs the daily chore of shooting Russell. Then, both impulsively and apologetically, she shoots Milton. She sets fire to the house and calls Archer and Nabiki to say that she will come over with the full load of meth. She gets the money from Archer with the aid of a grenade, then drives away.

When she wakes, amazed to find another Tuesday, she joyfully searches for Milton, but finds his video playing in the bathtub, advising Milton to kill her. Milton pierces her hand with an arrow and aims a gun at her. She realizes that Milton had not killed Russell yesterday, so that the Tuesday would reboot, and explains that she had been happy that she could see him again. Russell interrupts the conversation by overpowering them both, watching the video, and realizing there must be only one left standing. To decide the winner, Russell proposes Russian roulette, but kills himself on the first turn. Skyler and Milton profess their love, then Milton shoots himself. Skyler is awakened on Wednesday by Archer and Nabiki, who have come to steal back the cash. Now there are three bloody-minded participants in the valley again, and Nabiki, aiming a gun, hesitates as Skyler begins to laugh and laugh.

== Cast ==
- Milo Cawthorne as Milton
- Olivia Tennet as Skyler
- Ari Boyland as Russell
- Cohen Holloway as Archer
- Adelaide Kane as Nabiki
- Fleur Saville as Claire
- Mike Ginn as Riley

== Production ==
Screenwriter Eddie Guzelian came up with the idea for the film from an incident when he left a note for himself one night, only to later find another note he had left for himself the night before that he had no memory of writing. Milo Cawthorne freely admits to the story's resemblance to the 2000 film Memento. Paxson and Guzelian also described the movie as a cross between Blood Simple and Groundhog Day.

The film in many ways serves as a reunion of cast and crew for the 2009 series Power Rangers RPM: the film was scripted by Eddie Guzelian, the head writer and executive producer for said-show; Cawthorne, Tennet, Boyland, Kane, Ginn, and producer McIver previously co-starred on RPM; and director Paxson was a writer on RPM.

== Themes ==
A reviewer at the Vodzilla website writes that "there is, hanging from this film's gallow's humour, plenty of serious subtext" and explains,

Given that all three characters are meth users, in a rather obvious way, the film's narrative cycle serves as a metaphor for the recurring nightmare of drug dependency, where appetite, paranoia and desperation reign, and one day bleeds into another. On the other hand, it is just as obviously an allegory of the never-ending spiral down which humanity is taken by violence and vendetta. Yet, as a film ruled by threes, there is a third reading of events available here. Caught between good guy Milton and bad boy Russell, Skyler is both calculating aggressor and sympathetic victim, her sociopathic survival instincts well honed from a lifetime of mistreatment at the hands of Russell and his associates (who have been passing her between them since she was 12). As she takes one day at a time, what she is trying to escape, ultimately, is the cycle of abuse – but as we know, that is never as easy as it sounds.

== Release ==
The film had its world premiere on October 26th, 2013, at the Austin Film Festival, and appeared at several more film festivals throughout 2014 and 2015. Released on DVD and video on demand on September 1, 2015, it followed as streaming media on September 1, 2016. Special features on the DVD include deleted scenes, outtakes, and test footage.

== Reception ==
On the review aggregator website Rotten Tomatoes, 89% of 9 critics' reviews are positive, with an average rating of 8/10.

Critical and viewer reception for Blood Punch was positive. The Austin Chronicle and Bloody Disgusting both praised the film, with Bloody Disgusting favorably comparing it to the 1948 film Road House, "with heaps of dark humor and a madcap edge that cuts deep." The Hollywood Reporter called it "wickedly clever" with "a mind-bending series of complications." The Movies In Focus site gave Blood Punch 4 out of 5 stars, calling it "a slick, polished affair" suggestive of "Groundhog Day meets Evil Dead by way of Breaking Bad."

HEAVY Magazine gives a rating of 5/5, calling the screenplay remarkable and well-rounded: "The film always works due to the fact despite a myriad of backstabs (literally) plus the regular twists and turns you would expect from a film like this, you do actually find yourself rooting for Skyler and Milton as a couple." Horror Cult Films rated the movie at 7.5 out of 10 stars as an "intriguing, entertaining slice of time-loop, blood-splatted action," while a reviewer at the Nerdly website also gives it 5/5 as "a fantastic horror experience," praising the acting and the way the murders become "ever more farcical and gloriously over the top." Vodzilla rates the film at 4/4 stars, praising how "Paxson's black comedy horror uses its Groundhog Day structure to capture cycles of abuse, addiction and violence." The Gruesome Magazine reviewer awarded the film 4.5 out of 5 and placed it at #3 on his Top Ten Horror Films of 2015 list.

=== Awards ===
- Dark Matters Audience Award at the Austin Film Festival (2013, won)
- Audience Award for Fusion Features at Dances With Films (2014, won)
- Audience Award for Run of Fest Features at Dances With Films (2014, won)
- Festival Award for Best Feature Film at the Hoboken International Film Festival (2014, won)
- Festival Award for Best Director at the Hoboken International Film Festival (2014, won - Madellaine Paxson)
- Festival Award for Best Cinematography at the Hoboken International Film Festival (2014, won - Neil Cervin)
- Jury Award for Best Feature Film at the New Orleans Horror Film Festival (2014, won)
- Jury Award for Best OFF THE EDGE Feature at the Omaha Film Festival (2014, won)

== See also ==
- List of films featuring time loops
