= Fiona Jackson =

British filmmaker based in New Zealand

Fiona Jackson (born 29 July) is a filmmaker currently based in New Zealand.

Born in Bath, England, Jackson moved to California in 1993 where she began her career in the film industry as a stunt performer and assistant for film, television and broadway director Tom Moore.

She graduated with a BA majoring in Screen and Media with a minor in Philosophy from the University of Waikato, and subsequently an MA in Visual Arts, Moving Image from WINTEC. As part of her master's degree she directed An Evening With Richard O'Brien, a live showcase featuring Rocky Horror's Richard O'Brien and New Zealand current affairs television presenter, Mark Sainsbury. A second showcase Partytime with Richard O'Brien was filmed at the Founders Theatre in Hamilton, New Zealand in celebration of O'Brien's 70th birthday. Jackson graduated from the University of Waikato in 2018 with a doctoral thesis titled Vocational Survival: Expanding the Film Value Chain for the Independent Filmmaker.

She is writer/producer of feature film Penny Black, co-written with director Joe Hitchcock, starring Astra McLaren as Penny Black, Anton Tennet as Guy, and Toni Garson as Alex Black. Penny Black was musically scored by the Scorelocks Collective of Jeremy Mayall and Chris Lam Sam.
