= Power Rangers Hyperforce =

- Power Rangers Hyperforce Logo
- Also known as: Saban's Power Rangers Hyperforce
- Genre: Tabletop; Action; Adventure; Science fiction; Superhero
- Created by: Haim Saban
- Based on: Power Rangers by Haim Saban, & Toei Company, and Super Sentai by Toei Company
- Developed by: Hyper RPG
- Written by: Cameron Rice; Zac Eubank; Malika Lim; Melissa Flores; Brian Casentini
- Starring: Peter Sudarso; Andre Meadows; Paul Schrier; Meghan Camarena; Cristina Vee; Malika Lim
- Composer: Noam Kaniel
- Country of origin: United States
- Original language: English
- No. of seasons: 1
- No. of episodes: 26

Production
- Producer: Hyper RPG
- Production locations: Los Angeles, California
- Running time: Approx. 3 hours (Note: Each episode is allotted around 3 hours for the Rangers to complete that episode's story. Due to the nature of how tabletop role-playing games work however this time will often vary episode to episode dependent upon how quickly the Game Master and Rangers progress through the story.)
- Production companies: Saban Brands; Hyper RPG

Original release
- Network: Twitch (2017–2018)
- Release: October 24, 2017 – April 24, 2018

Power Rangers Hyperforce (stylized as HyperForce) is an interactive live-streamed tabletop role-playing game web series from Saban Brands and Hyper RPG based on the long-running American television program Power Rangers. The show was announced at TwitchCon 2017 and premiered on October 24, 2017, on Hyper RPG's Twitch live-streaming channel and includes members of the Power Rangers franchise along with other Internet personalities. Rangers from past seasons of Power Rangers guest star, including Erin Cahill (of Power Rangers Time Force). It is overseen by Malika Lim as Game Master.

Power Rangers Hyperforce is published on Hyper RPG's Twitch live-streaming channel and YouTube channel. It is also published in an audio podcast format by Hyper RPG through SoundCloud, Google Play, iTunes and Spotify.

== Plot ==
Power Rangers Hyperforce is set in the year 3016 at Time Force Academy. A team of Time Force Ranger cadets must band together to defeat an ancient evil who is set on unraveling the very fabric of the universe. Under the leadership of their mentor, Jen Scotts, and with the show's Game Master, Malika Lim, the newly minted Rangers will cross both time and space to complete their mission while running into many familiar eras (and faces) along the way.

== Cast ==
Hyperforce Power Rangers

- Peter Sudarso as Marvin "Marv" Leonard Shih, the Hyperforce Red Ranger. Peter Sudarso portrayed Preston Tien, the Ninja Steel Blue Ranger from Power Rangers Ninja Steel.
- Andre Meadows as Edward "Eddie" Banks XXV, the Hyperforce Blue Ranger. Andre Meadows is the creator and host of the YouTube web series known as Black Nerd Comedy.
- Paul Schrier as Jack Dealgoode Thomas, the Hyperforce Yellow Ranger. Jack is the most experienced of the team, as he was a beat cop as opposed to the others who are all cadets. Paul Schrier formerly portrayed Farkas "Bulk" Bulkmeier throughout the Power Rangers franchise starting with Mighty Morphin Power Rangers.
- Meghan Camarena as Chloe Ashford, the Hyperforce Pink Ranger. Camarena is known as social media personality, Strawburry17.
- Cristina Vee as Vesper Leigh Vasquez, the Hyperforce Black Ranger. Cristina is a prolific voice actor for English dubs of anime, cartoons and video games.
- Yoshi Sudarso as Joseph "Joe" Shih, the Time Force Silver Ranger and Hyperforce Green Ranger. Joe is the Hyperforce Power Rangers' sixth Ranger. Yoshi Sudarso formerly portrayed Koda, the Dino Charge Blue Ranger from Power Rangers Dino Charge. Yoshi's role on the show is that of a recurring guest player.

Supporting cast

- Malika Lim as the Game Master. She acts as narrator, organizer, officiant regarding rules, arbitrator, and moderator. She also portrays most non-player characters.

== Fireside Chat ==
The Fireside Chat is an informal, impromptu interactive live-streamed aftershow web series that immediately follows most, though not all, episodes of Power Rangers Hyperforce. During the Fireside Chat various members of Saban Brands and Hyper RPG, including the cast and guest players, discuss with the Twitch chat room the most recent episode of Power Rangers Hyperforce. Each episode of the Fireside Chat runs for approximately 30 minutes and is published exclusively on Hyper RPG's Twitch live-streaming channel.

== Episodes ==
No.	Title (Note: Titles are not present for episodes when they first premiere on Hyper RPG's Twitch live-streaming channel. Titles only become available once the episode is subsequently uploaded to Hyper RPG's YouTube channel the following week.)	Guest players	Original release date
1	"Welcome to Time Force Academy"	Erin Cahill as Jen Scotts, the Time Force Pink Ranger	October 24, 2017
2	"It's Morphin Time!"	N/A	October 31, 2017
3	"Whatever Happened to Scorpina?"	N/A	November 7, 2017
4	"Aisha Campbell Returns!"	Karan Ashley as Aisha Campbell, the 2nd Mighty Morphin Yellow Ranger	November 14, 2017
5	"We Need Megazord Power!"	N/A	November 21, 2017
6	"Vesper's Betrayal"	N/A	November 28, 2017
7	"It's Boom Time"	Mike Ginn as Gem, the RPM Ranger Operator Series Gold	December 12, 2017
8	"Holiday Special Featuring Santa!"	Zac Eubank as Santa Claus	December 19, 2017
9	"Dr. Tommy Oliver Returns!"	Jason David Frank as Dr. Tommy Oliver, the Dino Thunder Black Dino Ranger	January 2, 2018
10	"Family"	N/A	January 9, 2018
11	"A Ranger in King Arthur's Court"	Allie Gonino as Lady Guinevere	January 16, 2018
12	"Save Marv"	Yoshi Sudarso as Joseph "Joe" Shih, the Time Force Silver Ranger	January 23, 2018
13	"What Happened to Rita Repulsa"	N/A	January 30, 2018
14	"SPD Emergency"	N/A	February 6, 2018
15	"Absorption"	Yoshi Sudarso as Joseph "Joe" Shih, the Time Force Silver Ranger	February 13, 2018
16	"Homecoming"	Yoshi Sudarso as Joseph "Joe" Shih, the Time Force Silver Ranger	February 20, 2018
17	"Director Ransik"	Yoshi Sudarso as Joseph "Joe" Shih, the Time Force Silver Ranger	February 27, 2018
18	"Stage 4: The Armada"	Cameron Jebo as Orion, the Super Megaforce Silver Ranger	March 6, 2018
19	"Shattered Grid Part 1"	Kyle Higgins as "Captain Michael Hicks"; Malika Lim as Colonel Lina Song	March 13, 2018
20	"Shattered Grid Part 2"	Jason David Frank as Lord Drakkon; Malika Lim as Colonel Lina Song	March 20, 2018
21	"Enter The Green Ranger"	Yoshi Sudarso as Joseph "Joe" Shih, the Hyperforce Green Ranger	March 27, 2018
22	"Fight for the Corona Aurora"	Yoshi Sudarso as Joseph "Joe" Shih, the Hyperforce Green Ranger	April 3, 2018
23	"Rebirth… Kind Of"	Yoshi Sudarso as Joseph "Joe" Shih, the Hyperforce Green Ranger	April 10, 2018
24	"Finale (Part 1)"	Yoshi Sudarso as Joseph "Joe" Shih, the Hyperforce Green Ranger; Christopher Khayman Lee as Andros, the Space Red Ranger; Mike Ginn as Gem, the RPM Ranger Operator Series Gold; Karan Ashley as Aisha Campbell, the 2nd Mighty Morphin Yellow Ranger	April 17, 2018
25	"Season Finale"	Yoshi Sudarso as Joseph "Joe" Shih, the Hyperforce Green Ranger; Zac Eubank as Various (See Notes)	April 24, 2018
Special	"Power Rangers Villains"	Mike Ginn as Unnamed Attack Bot #6 (dumbbell-themed Attack Bot) aka "Dumbbot"; Malika Lim as Waspicable; Cameron Rice as Robogoat and Eye Guy; Melissa Flores as Poisandra; Jason Bischoff as Psycho Green	March 25, 2018

== Comics ==
In 2018, the HyperForce Rangers appeared in Boom! Studios' "Shattered Grid", a crossover event between teams from all eras commemorating the 25th anniversary of the original television series. It was published in Mighty Morphin Power Rangers #25-30 and various tie-ins.

In April 2023, it was announced that Hyperforce would receive a one-shot comic continuation entitled Power Rangers Unlimited: Hyperforce #1. The book will be written by Melissa Flores and Meghan Camarena, illustrated by Federico Sabbatini, colored by Bryan Valenza and release on July 19, 2023.

== Hyper RPG ==
Hyper RPG (Hyper Rabbit Power Go) is an entertainment channel that streams live tabletop games, reviews and talk shows every weekday on Twitch. Each show has different casts but can often feature returning players and special guest stars.

=== Background ===
Founded in February 2016 Hyper RPG was created in cooperation with Harebrained Schemes, a video game developer responsible for the Shadowrun Returns and Battletech computer games. They broadcast their first show, a Battletech tabletop game titled Death From Above on March 3, 2016. In December 2018 Hyper RPG CCO Zac Eubank announced via YouTube Video the company would be moving to a new studio after a noticeable absence of content. Hyper RPG now boasts two to four videos a day on Twitch and many of their shows also airing on, and archived at YouTube.

=== Ruleset ===
The Hyperforce RPG system was custom made for the series. A complete ruleset for the game was never released, but a partial rundown of the games design was given by Game Designer Malika Lim.

=== Format and other shows ===
Role-playing Games - The role-playing games featured on Hyper RPG range from standard Dungeons & Dragons to licensed setting material much like Power Rangers Hyperforce. Often these shows will feature a game master and four to five players, with an occasional guest depending on the game. Many of their shows feature heavy viewer participation where participants can donate to the channel to earn the players a power-up or extra roll. Larger donations may initiate plot twists in the story, causing further drama to unfold. Each episode regardless of game will often run between 2 and 3 hours, with a short intermission somewhere in the middle of the broadcast.

Reviews - Review shows covering television shows, movies, books and general pop culture and often with a rotating panel of guests and regular members. Typically these will air when a notable pop-culture event is released.

Talk Shows - General forum for news, pop talk and the opinions of the guests and hosts. Many of their talk shows air daily, often before or after a related show, with the Coffee & Comics airing on Wednesdays.

Podcast - Hyper Heroes is a podcast form of some of the non-role-playing game shows. The Podcast has been active since August 1, 2017

Weekly Update - Every Monday a member of the team will break down the schedule for the week and share channel news.

=== Kollok 1991 ===
Recent show Kollok 1991 is inspired by such shows as Stranger Things, X-Files, and Twin Peaks. Kollok utilizes the game system Kids on Bikes, a game system designed to replicate the Stephen King style of storytelling of children banding together to face some unspeakable evil that the grown-ups don't even see. Kollok features Twin Peaks actor Ray Wise as part of the introduction. Wise was a guest star in a previous Hyper RPG show, 10 Candles.

=== Other gaming shows ===
Much like Power Rangers Hyperforce various licensed shows feature games set in various existing worlds. Games such as The Banner Saga, Pencils and Parsecs and Rat Queens. These shows follow a similar format to Power Rangers Hyperforce, run about as long and feature a primary cast with occasional guests. Hyper RPG also plays some classic Role-playing games such as Warhammer 40K and Shadowrun.
