= Mega Time Squad =

- Directed by: Tim van Dammen
- Written by: Tim van Dammen
- Produced by: Tim van Dammen; Anna Duckworth
- Starring: Anton Tennet; Jonathan Brugh
- Cinematography: Tim Flower
- Edited by: Luke Haigh
- Music by: Mike Newport
- Production company: Dark Sky Films
- Release date: 17 July 2018 (Fantasia International Film Festival)
- Running time: 86 minutes
- Country: New Zealand
- Language: English

Mega Time Squad is a 2018 New Zealand action-adventure crime comedy film produced, written and directed by Tim van Dammen and starring Anton Tennet and Jonathan Brugh. The film premiered at Fantasia International Film Festival on 17 July 2018 and by the end of September was locally premiered at Sydney Underground Film Festival. Later on, the film had its international premiere at the Chicago Cinema Society's Chicago Filmmakers section on 20 November 2018.

== Plot ==
In Thames, New Zealand, John is a petty thief who works alongside Sheldon, his boss. One day, during an attempted heist he steals a bracelet which upon putting it on can send one travelling through time. But time travelling can be unpredictable, and John, unknowingly ends up cloning himself. The clone then clones another John, and another. To keep his clones in check, John forms a "Mega Time Squad".

== Cast ==
- Anton Tennet as John
- Jonathan Brugh as Shelton
- Hetty Gaskell-Hahn as Kelly
- Charles Chan as Wah Lee
- Yoson An as Wen
- Jaya Beach-Robertson as Hootch
- Milo Cawthorne as "Damage"
- Ashley Jones as Taotie the Tour Guide
- Mick Innes as Les
- Arlo Gibson as "Gaz"
- Morgan Albrecht as Shayna
- Josh McKenzie as trashinator
- Lewis Roscoe as worker on the toilet
- Axl Scott as Gibbo
- Tian Tan as Wah Lee
- Paul Trimmer as Marcus
- Simon Ward as Jay
- Eru Wilton as Terry

== Reception ==
On review aggregator website Rotten Tomatoes, the film has an approval rating of 79% based on 19 critics, with an average rating of 6.4/10.

Dennis Harvey of Variety wrote "The unique mix of simultaneously droll and broad humor is very nicely delivered by a well-cast ensemble, resulting in a polished oddity that should make a splash at home, while attracting decent overseas interest".

Critics from RogerEbert.com had a split opinion. Odie Henderson gave the film 2 stars out of 4, writing "I still retain a tween boy's affection for movies that dare to be this goofy". Nick Allen, on the other hand, called it "A grounded sci-fi mini-odyssey with lots of creativity and even more laugh-out-loud gags". A review at RNZ wrote, "Mega Time Squad is the sort of film that could only come out during the Spring Clean, and it's by no means the worst of that genre."

Karl Puschman opened his review for the New Zealand Herald by stating "You don't need a time travelling device to realise that Mega Time Squad is destined to become a future cult classic."
