= Guns Akimbo =

2019 film by Jason Lei Howden

- New Zealand theatrical release poster
- Directed by: Jason Lei Howden
- Written by: Jason Lei Howden
- Produced by: Joe Neurauter; Felipe Marino; Tom Hern
- Starring: Daniel Radcliffe; Samara Weaving; Natasha Liu Bordizzo; Ned Dennehy; Grant Bowler; Edwin Wright; Rhys Darby
- Cinematography: Stefan Ciupek
- Edited by: Luke Haigh; Zaz Montana
- Music by: Enis Rotthoff
- Production companies: Occupant Entertainment; Four Knights Film; Maze Pictures; Cutting Edge; The Electric Shadow Company; Umedia; Ingenious Media; WS Filmproduktion; Deutscher Filmförderfonds; FilmFernsehFonds Bayern; Hyperion Media; New Zealand Film Commission
- Distributed by: Madman Entertainment (New Zealand); Altitude Film Distribution (United Kingdom); Leonine Distribution (Germany); Saban Films (North America)
- Release dates: 9 September 2019 (TIFF); 28 February 2020 (United States); 5 March 2020 (New Zealand); 25 June 2020 (Germany)
- Running time: 97 minutes
- Countries: New Zealand; United Kingdom; Germany; United States
- Language: English
- Budget: $15 million
- Box office: $1 million

Guns Akimbo is a 2019 action comedy film written and directed by Jason Lei Howden. It stars Daniel Radcliffe, Samara Weaving, Natasha Liu Bordizzo, Ned Dennehy, Grant Bowler, Edwin Wright, and Rhys Darby. In the film, an underground fight club becomes popular due to live-streaming fights to the death. A computer programmer criticizes the spectacle, and he is then forced to become one of its contestants.

The film had its world premiere at the 2019 Toronto International Film Festival and was released in the United States on 28 February 2020 by Saban Films, in New Zealand on 5 March 2020 by Madman Entertainment and in Germany on 25 June 2020 by Leonine Distribution. Due to the COVID-19 pandemic closing theatres worldwide, the film became available digitally on-demand less than three weeks after it was released theatrically.

== Plot ==
In an alternative near future, an underground fight club and a criminal organization known as Skizm has achieved massive popularity by live-streaming real death matches between criminals. Ordinary computer programmer Miles Lee Harris logs into Skizm's live-chat to insult viewers who turn murder into entertainment. Riktor, the criminal kingpin who runs Skizm, breaks into Miles' apartment with his henchmen Dane, Effie and Fuckface. After being beaten and drugged, Miles wakes up to find guns bolted into both of his hands. He learns that he has been forced to participate in Skizm by being pitted against Nix, the game's deadliest killer. Nix wants out of the games, but Riktor requires she kill Miles first.

Nix tracks Miles' phone. After he unsuccessfully tries to reason with Nix, she shoots up his apartment as he falls down the fire escape. Miles makes it to a local park and encounters his artist ex-girlfriend Nova Alexander, but when Miles reveals his plight, Nova flees in fright. Nova reports the situation to Detective Degraves, who has his partner Stanton hack Nova's phone so they can track Miles. Miles then goes to his workplace so his friend Hadley can hack the Skizm tracking malware on his phone.

Miles finally stands up to his condescending boss Zander by angrily pulling his guns. Zander is shot dead by Nix, who starts shooting up the office. Miles escapes in a stolen car and Nix chases him on a motorbike. After he again fails to reason with Nix, Miles calls Nova but sees Riktor kidnapping her. Miles calls the police and leaves his phone in a junkyard to provide the location. He then inadvertently interrupts a drug deal between two rival gangs. Nix shows up and starts gunning down thugs while pursuing Miles. Miles accidentally makes his first kill, a gang lord who hunted him down.

The police arrive and arrest Miles. While transporting him, Degraves and Stanton explain their plan to use Miles as bait to lure Nix, whom they have been trying to capture for years. Degraves reveals that Nix is his daughter. Nix was driven insane after Riktor took revenge on Degraves for taking down Riktor's gang by blowing up his family's van. Degraves had managed to save Nix, but his wife and son had died. Stanton shoots Degraves dead, revealing himself as a mole working for Riktor.

Stanton plays a video message in which Riktor explains that Miles has thirty minutes to kill Nix or else he will kill Nova. Miles recovers his phone from Degraves' body. While coercing a gaming café patron into hacking Nova's phone to retrieve her location, Miles learns the Skizm communities dubbed him "Guns Akimbo" as he has become the most popular player ever. Miles arrives at Nova's supposed location to find Riktor waiting. Riktor taunts Miles by dumping Hadley's dead body before driving away.

Miles secretly meets with Nix and tells her that Riktor murdered her father and kidnapped his ex-girlfriend. Seeking revenge, Nix agrees to a plan where they successfully stage a scene for Skizm's broadcast camera drones. She seemingly guns down Miles, who is actually wearing a bulletproof vest that he removed from Degraves. Henchmen recover Miles' body and transport him to Riktor's Skizm hideout. Nix joins Miles as they take down Riktor's henchmen, including Dane and Effie. Nix is mortally wounded in the gunfight and sacrifices herself by detonating a suicide vest that blows up Fuckface and the rest of Riktor's men so Miles can survive. Riktor shoots Stanton while heading to the rooftop with Nova.

At the rooftop, Miles charges at Riktor and ultimately kills him, but not before Riktor tells Miles that Skizm is becoming a global franchise. After Riktor dies, Miles collapses from massive blood loss while imagining a romantic reunion with Nova. However, Nova actually becomes frightened and goes into shock after seeing what Miles is turning into.

Some time later, Miles discovers a comic book written by Nova and learns that she is promoting Miles as a popular hero by writing a comic book based on their story. With Skizm spreading worldwide under new leaderships, Miles embarks on a mission to destroy the entire criminal organisation.

== Cast ==
- Daniel Radcliffe as Miles Lee Harris
- Samara Weaving as Nix Degraves
- Ned Dennehy as Riktor
- Natasha Liu Bordizzo as Nova Alexander
- Grant Bowler as Detective Degraves
- Edwin Wright as Stanton
- Milo Cawthorne as Hadley
- Mark Rowley as Dane
- Racheal Ofori as Effie
- Set Sjöstrand as Fuckface
- Rhys Darby as Glenjamin
- Richard Knowles as Zander
- Jack Riddiford as Shadwell
- Hanako Footman as Ruby
- Colin Moy as Clive

== Production ==
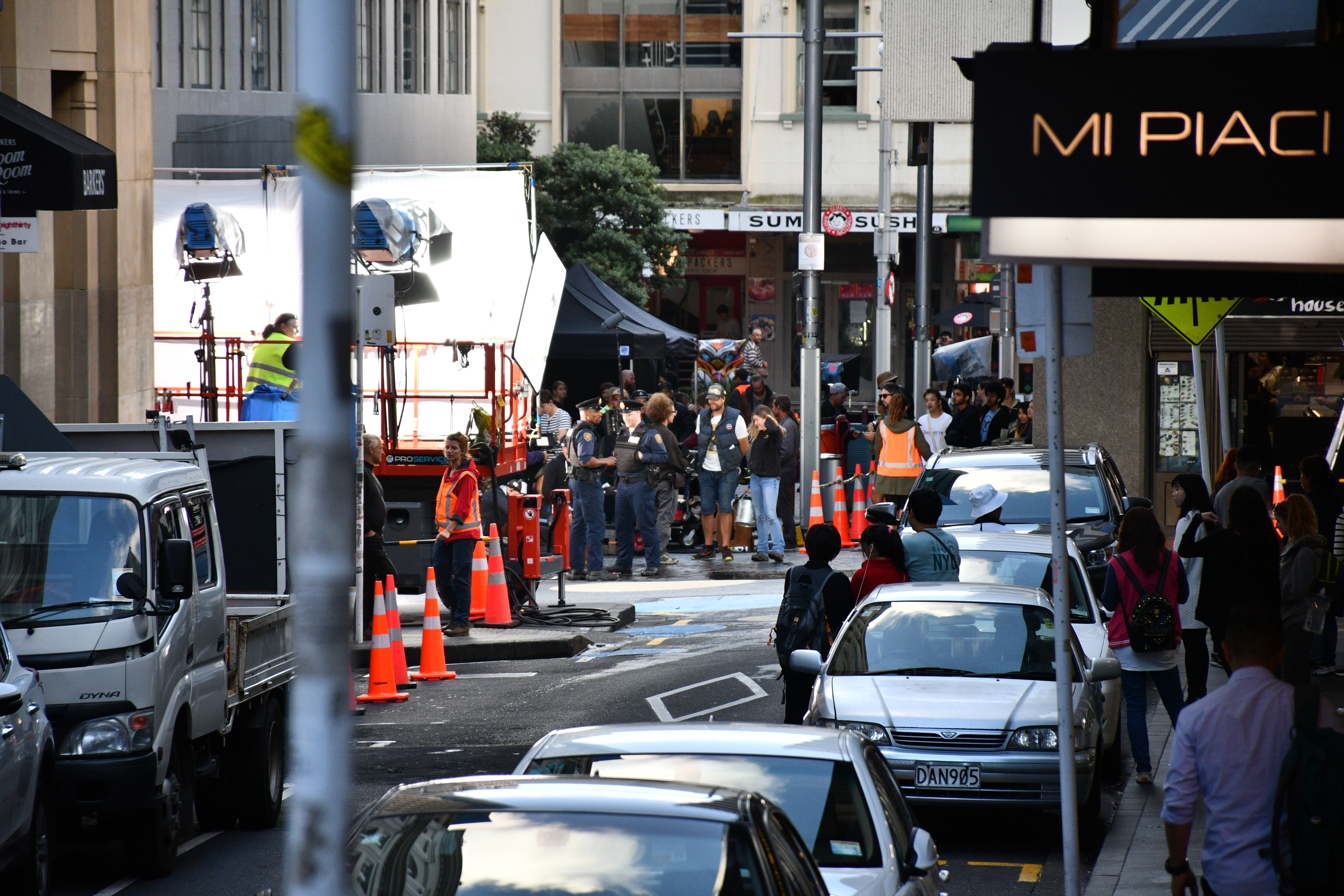
Filming for Guns Akimbo on Jean Batten Place

On 12 May 2017, it was announced that Daniel Radcliffe would be starring in Guns Akimbo by New Zealand director Jason Lei Howden, whose previous projects include the film Deathgasm. Felipe Marino and Joe Neurauter were also announced to be producing the film through Occupant Entertainment. On 8 May 2018, Natasha Liu Bordizzo was added to the cast, starring opposite Radcliffe. Filming was completed on-location and in-studio in Auckland and Munich.

== Music ==
The soundtrack features original music composed by Enis Rotthoff.

Songs used in the film:

- "3 Words" by AKA Block
- "Ballroom Blitz" by 3Teeth
- "You Spin Me Round (Like a Record)" by 3Teeth
- "When the Shit Goes Down" by Cypress Hill
- "We'll Be Good Friends" by Cellamare
- "Real Wild Child" by Iggy Pop
- "Superfreak" by Rick James
- "Never Surrender" by Stan Bush

== Release ==
The film had its world premiere at the Toronto International Film Festival on 9 September 2019. It also screened at Fantastic Fest on 19 September 2019. Two months later, Saban Films acquired North American rights to the film. It was released in the United States on 28 February 2020 followed by New Zealand on 5 March and Germany on 25 June.

=== Home media ===
The film was released onto home video on DVD, Blu-ray and Digital in the United States on 28 April 2020 by Lionsgate Home Entertainment, followed by New Zealand on 11 June by Madman and Germany on 4 December by Leonine.

== Controversy ==
A week prior to the film's release, director Jason Lei Howden drew criticism for a series of tweets targeted at online film critics, accusing them of online bullying and "attempted murder" of another critic.

Despite speculation that the film's release would be delayed, Saban Films released later a statement confirming that the film would be released on 28 February 2020, adding: "While we do not condone, agree or share Mr. Howden's online behaviour, which is upsetting and disturbing, we are supportive of the film and all the hard work and dedication that has gone into making Guns Akimbo."

== Reception ==
On the review aggregator website Rotten Tomatoes, the film holds an approval rating of 51% based on reviews from 70 critics, with an average rating of 5.9/10. The website's critics consensus reads, "Frenetic to a fault, Guns Akimbo may leave some viewers reaching for the killswitch – but for others, its videogame-style violence will have plenty of replay value." On Metacritic, the film has a weighted average score of 42 out of 100 based on 10 critic reviews, indicating "mixed or average" reviews.

John DeFore of The Hollywood Reporter wrote: "The ingredients for an engagingly ridiculous action pic are here, but the pacing's all wrong." Dennis Harvey of Variety wrote: "This undeniably slick, energetic contraption plays somewhere between grating and numbing."
