= Mike Ginn =

New Zealand actor (born 1989)

- Born: Michael Daniel Ginn; 24 July 1989 (age 37); Auckland, New Zealand
- Occupation: Actor

Michael Daniel Ginn (born 24 July 1989) is a New Zealand actor best known for his role as Gem, Ranger Operator Series Gold in Power Rangers RPM.

== Early life and education ==
Ginn was born and raised in New Zealand and is of Chinese descent.

After realizing his passion for acting and drama in elementary school, Ginn began attending drama school in 2005, graduating in 2007 with a Bachelor of Performing and Screen Arts from Unitec Institute of Technology in Auckland.

== Career ==
A year after his graduation from drama school, Ginn was cast as Gem, Ranger Gold on the Auckland-shot children's television series Power Rangers RPM (2009).

Since then, Ginn has featured in various works, including the romantic comedy film My Wedding and Other Secrets (2011).

Ginn has also acted on the stage, performing in a theatre production titled White Trash Omnibus.

After reprising his role of Gem on Power Rangers Hyperforce (2017–2018), Ginn became more involved with the production studio, Hyper RPG. He would later appear as a main cast member on Hyper RPG's 10 Candles (2018), a horror anthology show based on the tabletop game of the same name, and would appear as a guest on Roguelike and Perception Check.

== Personal life ==
Ginn lives in Los Angeles, California.

Ginn has a fraternal twin brother named Ken. A graduate of the University of Auckland with a double degrees Bachelor of Health Sciences (B.H.Sc.) and Bachelor of Laws with Honours (LL.B. (Hons.)), Ken Ginn is a lawyer in Australia and is the founding president of the Asian Students in Auckland at the University of Auckland.

== Filmography ==
- Amazing Extraordinary Friends (2006) as Lloyd
- Power Rangers RPM (2009) as Gem / RPM Ranger Series Gold
- The Hopes and Dreams of Gazza Snell (2010)
- 13 Steps (2011) as Speed-freak
- My Wedding and Other Secrets (2011) as Vincent Wong
- Flat3 (2013) as Jackie Chan
- Blood Punch (2013) as Riley

=== Web series ===
- Power Rangers Hyperforce (2017–2018) as Gem / RPM Ranger Series Gold
- 10 Candles (2018) as Raymond Pierce Murasaki / Deputy Gabriel Decker / Cain Ronnie / Frank Macbeth / Jason Garrick / Arch Chase
- Roguelike (2018) as various characters
- Perception Check (2018) as Ghostice
