= Rusty: A Dog's Tale =

- US DVD cover
- Directed by: Shuki Levy
- Written by: Shell Danielson; Shuki Levy
- Produced by: Shuki Levy; Haim Saban
- Starring: Hal Holbrook; Rue McClanahan; Laraine Newman; Charles Fleischer; Blake Foster; Rodney Dangerfield; Bobcat Goldthwait; Doug E. Doug; Suzanne Somers; Patrick Duffy Animals were cared for and trained by Worldwide Movie Animals
- Cinematography: Frank Byers
- Edited by: Priscilla Nedd-Friendly
- Music by: Inon Zur
- Production company: Saban Entertainment
- Distributed by: 20th Century Fox Home Entertainment
- Release date: September 22, 1998
- Running time: 93 minutes
- Country: United States
- Language: English

Rusty: A Dog's Tale (Known as Rusty: The Great Rescue on Home Video) is a 1998 American adventure film directed by Shuki Levy and starring Hal Holbrook and Rue McClanahan. The movie was produced by Saban Entertainment and distributed by 20th Century Fox Home Entertainment under the CBS/Fox Video label.

== Synopsis ==
Rusty is a two-year-old beagle who lives in an animal shelter with his mother Malley, his father Cap, his newborn siblings and a variety of other animals, including a cat, some chickens, a goat, some ducks, a rabbit, a snake, a pair of turtles, and an elephant named Ellie, who often visits the farm. Rusty wants to prove his worth to both his parents as a strong and loyal member of the family, but his father is insistent that he be patient.

After the recent death of their parents through unspecified circumstances, ten-year-old Jory Callahan and his younger sister Tess are currently under the care of their paternal grandparents Boyd and Edna, the owners of the shelter. The quartet are constantly visited by their older cousins Bart and Bertha Bimini, who believe that Boyd and Edna cannot take adequate care of their grandchildren. They consider taking over from their elders as Jory and Tess' legal guardians, but Edna is very much against this idea, as the two are uneducated hillbillies whose only reason for adopting the siblings is to squander the trust fund money their parents left for them (it is implied that the late Mr and Mrs. Callahan were well endowed). Undaunted by their refusal, the Bimini siblings are determined to adopt Jory and Tess and get their hands on the money by any means necessary.

Edna and Boyd hold a small birthday party for Jory with their friend Dylan and his father, policeman Sheriff Wilson attending (the latter for a short period of time). Among the presents is a framed photo of their late parents, which sends Tess to her room. Jory is quick to cheer her up. Meanwhile, hidden from the humans in the barn-shed, Rusty and the other animals try to stop the ducks Zelda and Myrtle from squabbling and bickering over the ownership of an egg.

The next day, Rusty and the three kids visit a carnival where Bart and Bertha are working as clowns. They are hoping to save up enough money to afford a lawyer. They are admonished by their boss for not selling balloons and he accidentally drops his wallet that Rusty snatches. A chase ensues in which Bart ends up crashing in a duck pond. The boss recovers his wallet and accuses the two of stealing. Bart and Bertha are eventually fired after a vicious tongue-lashing from the boss.

Discouraged, Bart and Bertha dine out where they see a very rich man, Carl Winthrope looking for the animal shelter; he plans to buy a puppy for his daughter at the exact price of $300. While Bart tells Winthrope that he knows the owner, he lies that he is the co-owner, a scene witnessed by Sheriff Wilson. After bidding the man farewell and getting his card, Bart and Bertha decide to kidnap the puppies and put them up for sale, especially since Edna and Boyd are financially struggling and with no puppies of their own to sell, the bank will foreclose the mortgage on their house.

The dog-napping goes off without a cinch, Rusty picks up their scent and decides to save them. With the help of a raccoon and a pigeon named Koo, he sets off to find the Bimini residence, an old shack that has seen better days. Meanwhile, Bertha leaves one of the female puppies out on the road, assuming her to be sick. Rusty reunites with his sisters and spends the night looking after her.

Back at the Callahan residence, Edna explains to Tess exactly why Bart and Bertha want to adopt her and her brother and the trust fund their parents left behind. After putting her to bed, she contemplates selling her wedding ring to pay off the mortgage. Boyd persuades her into keeping it.

The next morning, after sharing breakfast with a cow. Rusty and his sister run into a skater dog named Rebel, who agrees to take his sister back to the barn. Malley and Cap are relieved.

That evening, Rusty naps just outside the Bimini shack—right within viewing distance of the siblings. Bart attempts to shoot Rusty, but the convenient timing of a rat on Bertha's leg causes her to freak out and Bart misses. Once awakened, Rusty races back to the farm and rounds up the animals into leading a rescue operation on the shack. The following mission results in the puppies being saved, the shack torn down, Bertha crashing her van into a lake and Bart getting knocked out by Ellie with a baseball to the head. Conveniently, Sheriff Wilson shows up, and, having overheard from some people about Bart and Carl Winthrop, puts two and two together.

A towing company and the grandparents soon catch up with the others. A furious Edna considers fricasseeing Bart and Bertha, but Sheriff Wilson enacts a more civil idea: letting them cool off in the County Jail. Bertha blames Bart for their failure and the two are led away, still insistent at claiming the children.

The film ends with one of the puppies being adopted by Winthrop's daughter. As repayment, Mr. Winthrop gives the Callahans enough money to reimburse their animal shelter. Back at the shelter, the egg Zelda and Myrtle had been fighting over hatches, revealing a baby turtle.

== Partial cast ==
- Hal Holbrook as Boyd Callahan
- Rue McClanahan as Edna Callahan
- Laraine Newman as Bertha Bimini
- Charles Fleischer as Bart Bimini
- Blake Foster as Jory
- Danielle Keaton as Tess
- Beau Billingslea as Sheriff Wilson
- Michael J. Pagan as Dylan Wilson
- Vincent Schiavelli as Carney Boss
- Ken Kercheval as Carl Winthrope
- Gigi Goyette as Gladys the Waitress
- James Mathers as Man at Carnival

Voices

- Rodney Dangerfield as Bandit the Rabbit
- Bobcat Goldthwait as Jet the Turtle
- Doug E. Doug as Turbo the Turtle
- Suzanne Somers as Malley the Dog
- Patrick Duffy as Cap the Dog
- Matthew Lawrence as Rusty the Dog
- Charlie Adler as Agent the Snake
- Mary Kay Bergman as Myrtle the Duck
- Jennifer Darling as Mrs. Cluck
- Melissa Disney as Boo the Cat
- Tony Oliver as Rebel the Dog
- Nick Jameson as Ratchet the Raccoon
- Frank Welker as Boss Duck
- Jane Singer as Koo the Pigeon
- Rue McClanahan as Latte the Cow/Zelda the Duck

Additional Voices

- Jim Cummings
- Chad Einbinder
- Steve Kramer
- Wendee Lee
- Julie Maddalena
- Brianne Siddall
- Michael Sorich

== Broadcast ==
Internationally, the movie aired on Fox Kids, Jetix, and on some feeds of Disney Channel and Disney XD.

== Reception ==
Of the film's 2006 re-release on DVD, Andre Dursin of The Aisle Seat offered that the film, a "very cute, impossible-to-dislike tele-film from Shuki Levy and Haim Saban easily trumps their more bombastic children's fare (like the Power Rangers).
