= Tom O'Sullivan (actor) =

Australian television, film and theatre actor

- Born: Perth, Australia
- Occupation: Actor
- Years active: 2001–present

Tom O'Sullivan is an Australian television, film and theatre actor. O’Sullivan was born in Perth, Western Australia, and later relocated to Sydney to study at the National Institute of Dramatic Art where he graduated in 2003. His first television role was a guest role on the soap opera Home and Away and was followed by playing Tom Huppatz in the ABC TV mini-series Rain Shadow. In 2010, O'Sullivan played Sean 'Grunter' Sinclair in the crime drama Underbelly: The Golden Mile and joined the main cast of Nine Network drama Cops LAC playing Senior Constable Nathan Holt. He has also portrayed William Chambers in the TVNZ 1 drama When We Go To War and Michael Shrimpton in the Seven Network drama series Molly.

Aside from his television work, O'Sullivan has appeared in mainstream films and independent short films. The actor has also concentrated on theatre work throughout his career. His involvement at the 2006 Short and Sweet theatre festival helped boost his profile and he gained numerous other stage roles.

== Early life ==
O’Sullivan was born in Perth, Western Australia, and went to Guildford Grammar School. All four of his grandparents served Australia in World War II. When he finished studying he spent one year travelling. O'Sullivan moved from Perth to study acting at the National Institute of Dramatic Art in Sydney. He completed his training and graduated in 2003. He resides in Balmain, New South Wales.

== Career ==
=== Television and film ===
O'Sullivan has appeared in numerous television series, films and theatre works. He has also contributed to some as a writer. The actor believed that by gaining experience in all three would be the best way to further his career. O’Sullivan's first television role was playing Keith Harris, a reporter who was punched in the face by the character Alf Stewart (Ray Meagher) following a helicopter crash, on the soap opera Home and Away. He also did voice work on the 2006 animated film Happy Feet. O'Sullivan secured the role of Tom Huppatz in the mini-series Rain Shadow, which aired on ABC TV from 7 October 2007. He also gained small roles in the mainstream films Fool's Gold (2008) and X-Men Origins: Wolverine (2009).

In 2010, O'Sullivan took a role on crime drama Underbelly: The Golden Mile playing Sean 'Grunter' Sinclair. To prepare for his role in Underbelly, the actor read books written by policemen who were involved with the subject matter of the show. He then secured a role in the main cast of Nine Network drama Cops LAC playing Senior Constable Nathan Holt. The character was described as an officer with ten years of experience in the police force. Nine Network decided not to renew the show for a second season. At the time O'Sullivan stated that Nathan had been his most high-profile role. He felt at ease playing Nathan because of his research into his role in Underbelly and similar characters he played in theatre.

In 2013, he played the role of Craig in the Seven Network drama Packed to the Rafters. He also appeared in the short film Invisible playing Mitch. The film was an official selection at various independent film festivals. He also played Adam Evans in the Network Ten comedy drama series Wonderland. Next came a guest appearance in the drama A Place to Call Home playing Jack Duncan Snr in the episode titled "The Ghosts of Christmas Past", which aired on 8 June 2014. O'Sullivan played the role of Connor in The Reckoning. He also appeared in the short film A Man on the Edge, playing the male lead Adam Western. The film was selected for the 2015 Flickerfest International Short Film Festival.

In 2015, the actor secured the role of William Chambers in the TVNZ 1 drama When We Go To War, which aired in New Zealand. The character is a "proud and intelligent" Australian doctor who resides in New Zealand and served in the Gallipoli Campaign. That year he gained more film appearances as Bret Buchanan in Observance and a newscaster in Truth. In 2016, O'Sullivan secured the role of Michael Shrimpton in the Seven Network drama series Molly. The show focuses on the Molly Meldrum's rise to fame via the show Countdown, which Shrimpton created.

In 2017, O'Sullivan returned to Home and Away, this time playing Brian Gilbert. In addition was a small role in the film Alien: Covenant. The actor secured the supporting role of Nate Sabo in the 2018 Network Ten drama series Playing for Keeps. He also played Michael Gibson in the first episode of Nine Network drama Bite Club and played a doctor in an episode of Preacher.

In 2023, O'Sullivan appeared in channel 7 mini-series The Claremont Murders.

=== Theatre ===
O'Sullivan has also concentrated on theatre work gaining roles in various productions. In 2005, he played an officer in the East Coast Theatre Company production, Terminus. He then took part in the 2006 Short and Sweet theatre festival which helped launch his stage career. Notable works include playing Ferdinand and Caliban in Harlos Productions 2007 stagings of Shakespeare's The Tempest and Peter in Dying City. In 2009, O'Sullivan took the role of Craig in the Black Swan State Theatre Company production of The Dark Room, an original Australian play.

In February 2010, he took a lead role of Mitchell in The Little Dog Laughed at the Cremorne Theatre. That year he took on Freddy Page in The Deep Blue Sea at The Playhouse Theatre. In September 2011, the actor starred in a Cat On A Hot Tin Roof at Perth's State Theatre Centre of Western Australia. From January to February 2012, O'Sullivan appeared as Stanley Saunders in Hillary Bell's The White Divers of Broome at the Heath Ledger Theatre.

In September 2015, he starred in the theatre productions Ride and Fourplay which opened at the Eternity Playhouse, Sydney. In November 2018, O'Sullivan appeared in 80 Minutes No Interval at Theatre Works, St. Kilda.

== Filmography ==
Year	Title	Role	Notes
2001	Cross-Town Traffic	Matt	Short film
2004	The Lucky Country	Nuggett	Short film
2005	Boys Grammar	Nick	Short film
2006	Home and Away	Keith Harris	Guest role
2007	The Course	Ford	Film
2007	Rain Shadow	Tom Huppatz	Regular role
2008	Fool's Gold	Precious Gem Crew Member 2	Film
2008	Grey	Oldman	Short film
2009	The Key to Bravery	Angry Boss	Short film
2009	X-Men Origins: Wolverine	Logging Supervisor	Film
2009	Reality Survivor	Tommy Bel Castro	Short film
2010	Underbelly: The Golden Mile	Sean 'Grunter' Sinclair	Recurring role
2010	Cops LAC	Nathan Holt	Regular role
2011	Commercialisms	Actor	Short film
2012	Portrait of a Zombie	Neighbour	Film
2013	Packed to the Rafters	Craig / Logan	Guest role
2013	Invisible	Mitch	Short film
2013	Wonderland	Adam Evans	Guest role
2013	Refuge	David	Short film
2014	A Place to Call Home	John 'Jack' Duncan Snr	Guest role
2014	The Reckoning	Connor	Film
2014	A Man on the Edge	Adam Western	Short film
2015	Observance	Bret Buchanan	Film
2015	Truth	Newscaster	Film
2015	When We Go To War	William Chambers	Regular role
2016	Molly	Michael Shrimpton	Main role
2017	Home and Away	Brian Gilbert	Guest role
2017	Alien: Covenant	David/Walter Double	Film
2017	Outbreak Generation	Ben	Short film
2018	Bite Club	Michael Gibson	Guest role
2018	Playing for Keeps	Nate Sabo	Guest role
2019	The Furies	Derek	Film
2019	Preacher	Doctor	Guest role
2022	Avarice	Ryker	Film
2023	The Claremont Murders	Lance Williams	Main role
2023	It Only Takes a Night	Gavin	Film
2023	NCIS Sydney	Brandis	Guest Role
