= Jason Lei Howden =

New Zealand film director and visual effects artist

Jason Howden
- Born: Greymouth, New Zealand
- Occupations: Film director; visual effects artist
- Years active: 2001–present
- Notable work: Deathgasm; Guns Akimbo

Jason Howden is a New Zealand film director and visual effects artist.

== Early life ==
Howden was born and raised in Greymouth, New Zealand. He left high school at age 17 to pursue a career in the entertainment industry.

== Career ==
Aged 17, Howden began working as a television cameraman and editor at a local television station in Nelson. He began his directing career with his short film Automaton in 2005. Howden wrote and directed his debut feature Deathgasm in 2014. The film won several awards at Toronto After Dark Film Festival and other international film festivals.

Between 2017 and 2018, Howden wrote the feature film Guns Akimbo, and an adaptation of video game Dead Island. In 2019, he directed Guns Akimbo, starring Daniel Radcliffe and Samara Weaving, which premiered at the Toronto International Film Festival on 9 September 2019. The film was released in New Zealand on 5 March 2020 by Madman Entertainment.

In September 2022, Howden was set to direct an adaptation of Monsters of Metal, based on the comics he had written with Llexi Leon. The director was also attached as a co-writer along with Leon.

Since 2001, Howden has been working as a visual effects artist on films. He has worked on visual effects in several Hollywood movies, including The Hobbit: The Battle of the Five Armies, The Hobbit: The Desolation of Smaug, The Hobbit: An Unexpected Journey, Man of Steel, Gods of Egypt, and War for the Planet of the Apes, among others.

== Selected filmography ==
=== Director ===
- 2003: Parabiosis
- 2005: Automaton
- 2008: Veil
- 2010: Melodies of the Heart
- 2014: The Light Harvester
- 2015: Deathgasm
- 2019: Guns Akimbo
- 2025: Deathgasm 2: Goremageddon

=== Visual effects ===
- 2021: Spiderhead
- 2021: The Beatles: Get Back
- 2021: Shang-Chi and the Legend of the Ten Rings
- 2021: Night Raiders
- 2017: War for the Planet of the Apes
- 2017: Pork Pie
- 2016: Gods of Egypt
- 2014: The Light Harvester
- 2014: The Hobbit: The Battle of the Five Armies
- 2013: The Hobbit: The Desolation of Smaug
- 2013: Romeo and Juliet: A Love Song
- 2013: The Wolverine
- 2013: Man of Steel
- 2012: The Hobbit: An Unexpected Journey
- 2005: Automaton
