= Kids World (film) =

2001 film by Dale G. Bradley

Kids World (aka Honey, the Kids Rule the World)
- Early DVD cover art
- Directed by: Dale G. Bradley
- Written by: Michael Lach
- Produced by: Grant Bradley; Thomas Mulack; Tom Taylor
- Starring: Christopher Lloyd; Blake Foster; Anton Tennet; Olivia Tennet
- Cinematography: Neil Cervin
- Edited by: Douglas Braddock
- Music by: Bruce Lynch
- Production companies: Blue Rider Pictures; Daybreak Point Entertainment
- Distributed by: Mainline Releasing; Arkles Entertainment; Blue Steel Releasing; Hannover House; Kanal D; Scanbox International
- Release dates: 7 December 2001 (U.S.); 26 December 2001 (Australia); 28 March 2002 (New Zealand)
- Running time: 93 minutes
- Countries: United States; New Zealand
- Language: English
- Box office: $19,354

Kids World is a 2001 children’s film written by Michael Lach and directed by Dale G. Bradley. Though the story is set in Oregon, the project was filmed in Auckland, New Zealand. The film had limited release in the US in 2001, before its Australian release on Boxing Day, 2001, and New Zealand release in 2002. In the United Kingdom, its DVD title was "Honey, the Kids Rule the World." In 2007 it had DVD release under that title by Third Millennium Distribution and in 2008 by Boulevard Entertainment. It aired in 2007 in Romania on Kanal D television.

== Plot ==
12-year-old Ryan Mitchell (Blake Foster) and his friends Stu (Anton Tennet) and Twinkie (Michael Purvis) are tired of being told what to do. They have to do their homework, eat their vegetables, wear a coat when they go outside, wear a helmet when they ride their bikes, and aren’t allowed to come and go as they please like their older brothers and sisters. One day, Ryan and his pals find an ancient Native American burial ground, where they discover a magical wishing glass. Using the glass, Ryan wishes that all the grown-ups and teenagers in the world would disappear—and suddenly, his wish comes true! It’s party time for Ryan and all his friends until they discover there’s a problem——the moment anyone turns 13, they suddenly vanish!

== Main cast ==
- Christopher Lloyd as Leo
- Blake Foster as Ryan Mitchell
- Anton Tennet as Stu
- Olivia Tennet as Nicole Mitchell
- Anna Wilson as Holly
- Michael Purvis as Twinkie
- Todd Emerson as Detloff

== Reception ==
=== Reception ===
"Variety" panned the film calling it "Charmless and exceptionally tasteless pre-teen time-filler" and "the sort of movie that seems conceived more out of tax-credit incentives than from any real desire to engage children’s imaginations." The story is set in Oregon but shot in New Zealand, exemplified by the principal cast’s accents. The work of writer Michael Lach and director Dale G. Bradley was pointed out as a "slack setup, in which recycle decades-old cliches about why kids don’t get along with their parents." They found Christopher Lloyd’s presence as a mentally disabled man with the mind of a child inexplicable, in that it was a "thankless role, which requires little of him, except to sit on a porch, playing a didgeridoo (another good hint that we’re not really in Oregon) until, in a few moments of convenient lucidity, he helps to save the day."

Conversely, Australia’s "Urban Cinefile" gave a positive review, offering that it was "refreshing to see a film where kids behave like kids," calling the film old fashioned, "in that it relies on its storyline and engaging performances by a terrific young cast." They felt the film was a colorful adventure for pre-teens and that it was "jam-packed with humor, action and enough twists and turns to keep us engaged. [sic]" The also felt the music score was both fast-paced and upbeat, and praised the entire cast, noting that Christopher Lloyd’s character was credible.

=== Awards and nominations ===
- 2000, Won’ Best Juvenile Performer’ for Olivia Tennet at New Zealand Film and TV Awards
- 2002, ‘Best Performance in a Feature Film - Leading Young Actor’ nomination for Blake Foster at Young Artist Awards
- 2002, ‘Best Family Feature Film - Comedy’ nomination at Young Artist Awards
