= Molly (miniseries) =

2016 Australian TV series

- Genre: Drama
- Written by: Matt Cameron; Liz Doran
- Directed by: Kevin Carlin
- Starring: Samuel Johnson; Tom O'Sullivan; T.J. Power; Krew Boylan; Aaron Glenane; Rebecca Breeds; Connor Crawford
- Country of origin: Australia
- Original language: English
- No. of episodes: 2

Production
- Executive producers: Michael Gudinski; Mark Morrissey
- Producer: John Molloy
- Production company: M4 Entertainment Production

Original release
- Network: Seven Network
- Release: 7 February – 14 February 2016

Molly is a two-part Australian miniseries about Australian music personality Molly Meldrum. Aired on the Seven Network, the first part premiered on 7 February 2016, with the second and final half screening on 14 February. It is based on Meldrum's biography, The Never, Um ... Ever Ending Story, which was written with journalist Jeff Jenkins.

== Synopsis ==
Framed by Ian "Molly" Meldrum's fall from a ladder outside his home during the 2011 Christmas season and his resulting coma, Molly flashes back and forth through the key events of Meldrum's life, from his small beginnings in Quambatook, through his rise to becoming one of the biggest names in Australian music.

The central focus of the series is the invention, rise and eventual fall of the high-rating TV series Countdown, and how it shaped Meldrum's life and legacy. It also includes the opportunities afforded to him as host of the groundbreaking new show, along with how his accessible personality and passion for music saw him become an essential figure of the Australian music scene in the 1970s, '80s and beyond.

== Cast ==
- Samuel Johnson as Molly Meldrum
- Aaron Glenane as Michael Gudinski
- Rebecca Breeds as Camille, Meldrum's fiancée
- Ben Gerrard as Caroline, Meldrum's transgender flatmate
- T.J. Power as Robbie Weekes, co-creator and director of Countdown
- Tom O'Sullivan as Michael Shrimpton, co-creator and producer of Countdown
- Benedict Hardie as Alan Wade, an ABC executive who clashes with Meldrum
- Heather Mitchell as Pat Hatcher, Wade's successor
- Krew Boylan as Lynne Randell
- Connor Crawford as John Paul Young
- Ben Geurens as Shirley Strachan
- Jacinta Stapleton as Madonna
- Kate Atkinson as Meldrum's mother
- Helen Morse as Meldrum's grandmother
- Toby Truslove as Gary Morris
- Tegan Higginbotham as Petra
- Amy Lehpamer as Michelle Higgins
- Jacqueline Brennan as Dot, canteen lady

Comedians Ed Kavalee, Andy Lee, Hamish Blake and Mick Molloy also make cameo appearances. Molly Meldrum appeared as himself, in an epilogue.

== Production ==
Filming of the telemovie took place in early 2015.

== Reception ==
=== Ratings ===
The first part of the telemovie was the highest-rating non-sport program in Australia for 2016.

It had 3.02 million national viewers (2.1 million metropolitan and 931,000 regional).

Episode	Air date	Viewers (in millions)	Nightly rank	Consolidated Viewers (in millions)	Adjusted rank	Source
"Part 1"	Sunday, 7 February 2016	1.793	#1	2.088	#1	
"Part 2"	Sunday, 14 February 2016	1.526	#2	1.750	#2	

Samuel Johnson went on to win the Gold Logie the following year for his performance.

== Music ==
A three-disc soundtrack featuring 60 tracks was released on 27 November 2015 by Liberation Music, titled Molly: Do Yourself a Favour after one of Meldrum's catchphrases on Countdown. It peaked at number 1 on the ARIA Albums Chart.

A second three-disc soundtrack was released on 21 October 2016 by Liberation Music, titled Molly: Counting Down The Hits.
