= Milo Cawthorne =

New Zealand actor (born 1989)

- Born: 30 April 1989 (age 37); Whangārei, New Zealand
- Occupation: Actor
- Years active: 2002–present
- Known for: Ziggy Grover / RPM Green Ranger in Power Rangers RPM
- Spouse: Olivia Tennet (m. 2013; sep. 2016)
- Partner: Ella Hope-Higginson (2019-present)

Milo Cawthorne (born 30 April 1989) is a New Zealand actor who played Ziggy Grover from the television series Power Rangers RPM.

== Career ==
Cawthorne began acting as a teenager with a role on the TV show P.E.T. Detectives. After graduating from secondary school, he chose to forgo a college education and continue pursuing an acting career. He appeared in children's television shows such as Secret Agent Men, Amazing Extraordinary Friends, Maddigan's Quest, and Power Rangers RPM. In Power Rangers RPM he played the Green Ranger, Ziggy Grover, a bumbling reformed ex-cartel member.

Cawthorne had starring roles in the WWI mini-series When We Go To War and the movies Blood Punch and Deathgasm; in the latter he acted alongside another former Power Ranger, Kimberly Crossman.

Cawthorne was nominated for Best Actor for his role in Blood Punch at the 2014 Hoboken International Film Festival in the United States, and was nominated for Best Actor: Blood Punch at the 2017 Rialto Channel New Zealand Film Awards (The Moas).

Cawthorne has also appeared in several major New Zealand theatre productions, including "The History Boys" at the Maidment Theatre.

== Personal life ==
In June 2013, Cawthorne married actress Olivia Tennet, who he had been dating since they co-starred on Power Rangers RPM. However, as of June 2016, the couple had split up. Cawthorne has been in a relationship with actress Ella Hope-Higginson since 2019, announcing their engagement in August 2025.

== Filmography ==
=== Film ===
| Year | Title | Role | Notes |
|---|---|---|---|
| 2003 | Christmas | Moses | |
| 2010 | Sweet As | Sean | Short |
| 2012 | Mae & Ash | Ash | Short |
| 2012 | Andy | Dale | Short |
| 2013 | I Love L.A. | Teddy | Short |
| 2013 | Hyperlink | Sam Gumball | Short |
| 2014 | Blood Punch | Milton | |
| 2015 | Restoration | Francis | Short |
| 2015 | Deathgasm | Brodie | |
| 2015 | Interloafer | Babe Barista | Short |
| 2016 | Shout at the Ground | James | Short |
| 2017 | Pork Pie | Hannibal | |
| 2017 | Human Traces | Pete | |
| 2017 | Mega Time Squad | Damage | |
| 2019 | Guns Akimbo | Hadley | |
| 2023 | Uproar | Kenneth | |
| 2025 | Wolf Man | Man | |

=== Television ===
| Year | Title | Role | Notes |
|---|---|---|---|
| 2003 | Secret Agent Men | D.J. | "I R.O.B.E.R.T." |
| 2003–2005 | P.E.T. Detectives | Evan | Regular role |
| 2006 | Maddigan's Quest | Bolek | "Newtown" |
| 2009 | Power Rangers RPM | Ziggy Grover/Green Ranger | Main role |
| 2011 | Underbelly NZ: Land of the Long Green Cloud | Jimmy Smith | "Thirty of Silver/One of Gold" |
| 2015 | When We Go to War | Harry Smith | TV miniseries |
| 2015 | Ash vs Evil Dead | Delmont | "Fire in the Hole" |
| 2020–2021 | Mystic | Adam | Recurring, Season 1 |
| 2021–2022 | Shortland Street | Dr Vincent Hughes | Guest |
| 2023 | Under the Vines | Philippe Bidois | Recurring, Season 2 |
| 2025 | Warren's Vortex | Darren | Main role |

=== Web series ===
| Year | Title | Role | Notes |
|---|---|---|---|
| 2015 | Jiwi's Machines | Rupert | |
| 2020 | Sidekick | Helpful Boy | |
