= Countdown (Australian TV program) =

Australian music television series

- Logo
- Genre: Music
- Created by: Michael Shrimpton; Robbie Weekes; Ian "Molly" Meldrum
- Directed by: Robbie Weekes; Paul Drane
- Presented by: Ian "Molly" Meldrum
- Theme music composer: Brian May
- Country of origin: Australia
- Original language: English
- No. of seasons: 14
- No. of episodes: 563

Production
- Executive producer: Michael Shrimpton
- Producers: Robbie Weekes & Paul Drane
- Production location: Ripponlea, Victoria
- Camera setup: Multi-camera
- Running time: 25 min First six episodes 55 min

Original release
- Network: ABC
- Release: 8 November 1974 – 19 July 1987

Countdown is an Australian music television program, broadcast by the Australian Broadcasting Corporation from 8 November 1974 until 19 July 1987. It was created by executive producer Michael Shrimpton, producer/director Robbie Weekes and record producer and music journalist Ian "Molly" Meldrum. Countdown was produced at the studios of the ABC in the Melbourne suburb of Ripponlea. It was screened Sunday night from 6:00pm to 7:00pm.

Countdown was the most popular music program in Australian TV history. It was broadcast nationwide on Australia's government-owned broadcaster, the ABC, and commanded a huge and loyal audience. It soon exerted a strong influence on radio programmers because of its audience and the amount of Australian content it featured. The first half-hour episode went to air at 6.30pm on Friday, 8 November 1974, but for most of the time it was on air, it also gained double exposure throughout the country by screening a new episode each Sunday evening, and then repeating it the following Saturday evening. The majority of performances on the show were lip synced.

Molly Meldrum, the program's talent co-ordinator, began appearing on-air in 1975, presenting the "Humdrum" music news segment and conducting interviews. Meldrum soon became the "face" of Countdown. He appeared regularly on-air until 1986. Another attraction to the program was the local and international acts who would host an episode—usually performing as well. During the show, Meldrum would interview them (while co-hosting) or have a chat with them before the show went out with the number-one single of the week. In October 2014, Meldrum published his autobiography, The Never, Um, Ever Ending Story.

== Cultural influence ==
Teen-oriented pop music still enjoyed strong popularity during the 1970s, although much of it was sourced from overseas, and the proportion of Australian acts in the charts had hit an all-time low by 1973. That trend began to change around 1975, and many credit that largely to the advent of Countdown. Much of the show's influence derived from its timeslot (Sundays at 6pm) and the fact that each week's show was repeated the following Saturday at 5pm; the series also undoubtedly benefitted hugely from the long-delayed introduction of PAL colour television system in Australia, which was introduced four months after Countdown premiered. Because of this, Countdown was also one of the first Australian TV series to be made entirely in colour.

Although it is not widely recognised, Countdown also had a strong international influence, because it was one of the first TV shows in the world to promote the regular use of the music video as a major part of its programming. Because of its receptivity to music videos (something of a necessity because of the comparative rarity of tours by overseas acts), Countdown proved to be instrumental in the worldwide success of a number of important overseas acts of the period. Madonna achieved her first hit single in April 1984 when "Holiday" was screened on Countdown. Subsequently, "Burning Up" reached the top twenty following repeated showings of the video clip on the show; this second song was not a hit in other countries. Other international artists—including Blondie, ABBA, John Mellencamp, Meat Loaf, Boz Scaggs and Cyndi Lauper—achieved their first hits in Australia thanks to their video clips being aired on Countdown, and this in turn led to their records being picked up and becoming hits in America and/or Europe.

Many international acts, who would otherwise have gone largely unheard on Australian commercial radio, gained important exposure in Australia on Countdown through their music videos; the list includes many UK "new wave" acts such as Duran Duran, XTC, The Beat, Elvis Costello, The Specials, Lene Lovich, Joe Jackson, and The Cure, and US acts such as The Ramones and The Cars.

Above all, Countdown was crucial to the success of many leading Australian acts, including John Farnham, AC/DC, Olivia Newton-John, INXS, Dragon, Hush, Kylie Minogue, I'm Talking, John Paul Young, Sherbet, Skyhooks, Ted Mulry Gang, Jimmy and the Boys, Marcia Hines, Mark Holden, The Angels, Mondo Rock, Men at Work, Icehouse, Australian Crawl and Mental As Anything.

The program dominated Australian popular music well into the 1980s. The popularity of Countdown started to lose momentum by the mid-1980s. Music videos were often shown rather than the artists performing live in the studio. It was cheaper to produce with videos, and this led to Countdown having no significant difference from any other music video program shown on TV during this time.

The final episode of Countdown aired on 19 July 1987. Meldrum co-hosted with, and interviewed, Carol Hitchcock and Jim Keays. It was followed by the last Countdown Awards ceremony. It was a sad night for many, yet a celebration of musical achievements in '86/'87. Meldrum made his appearance at the end of the show wearing his well-known Stetson hat. Meldrum saluted the music industry and fans and then bared his shaved head to the audience. It was well known that his shaved head was a statement to artists like Midnight Oil, who during their career, and being one of Australia's favourite bands, never appeared on the show due to regarding Countdown as too industry/hit-driven and appealing only to a young teenage audience.

In March 2007, the pay television service Foxtel, and its regional affiliate Austar, began screening hundreds of studio performances from the Countdown era. Themed Countdown specials have become very popular, and thought-lost performances by John Farnham, drag queen Divine, a-ha, Pseudo Echo and the Countdown Dancers performing the Flashdance medley highlight the popular music of the period.

The sign used in the logo is now housed and displayed at the Australian Centre for the Moving Image.

== Side shows ==
During 1982–83, two side shows called Countdown Friday and Countdown Flipside were aired on Friday and Saturday nights. 23 episodes of Countdown Flipside were produced and by mid 1983 19 episodes of Countdown Friday had been produced. Both were clip shows with voice overs by John Peters.

== Prince Charles interview ==
A well-known segment of the show's run is an atypical studio interview Meldrum conducted with Prince Charles. Meldrum was extremely nervous about interviewing the prince, and he botched a great many takes during the interview by flubbing his lines and even committing several royal protocol blunders. Members of his production crew gave him constant encouragement between takes, and eventually Prince Charles politely asked Meldrum if he could get a teleprompter to assist him with the interview, to which Meldrum replied that there was not one available.

The interview, or, rather, the numerous botched takes from it, has become a staple of blooper shows in Australia and beyond. Meldrum has since said of the interview, "It's not a regret, but I definitely stuffed that up."

== Wiped episodes ==
A large number of master videotapes recorded between 1974 and 1978 were later erased and recycled during a management-initiated "economy drive" at the ABC, an action which Meldrum later criticised and said was "unforgivable". Given the costs at the time of recording on videotape, most tapes were wiped and re-used. At least 100 episodes in total were erased from this period of the show's history.

In the book Glad All Over, Michael Shrimpton said at that time the ABC were "run by financial types [who] suddenly discovered that the increase in the purchase of video tapes had roared up 200 percent in 12 months". He said they didn't stop to consider that the video tape "was the cheapest link in the chain". An order came through from middle-management Bill Pritchard to erase a whole wall of tapes.

A total of 500 12-inch reels were pulled out, which affected at least 100 episodes. Ted Emery and Paul Drane heard about the order, surreptitiously removing as many reels as they could during the middle of the night and hiding them in their cars. According to Ted Emery, when the order came to erase the episodes, he used stalling tactics such as moving the tapes around. He said: "I kept thinking fifteen years down the track this stuff will be important." The producers tried stalling further by handing in trims and pre-assemblies rather than the master copies. "But it wasn't enough," Emery said. "I didn't have enough to give him so they took the masters as well". Had it not been for Emery and Drane, the few episodes from the 1974–78 period that remained would have been erased. That includes the first episode broadcast in colour.

With the exception of 30 episodes, all programs aired between 1975 and 1978 were erased; only two episodes which aired in 1976 are known to exist. Most of the episodes erased originally aired from 1975 to 1977, but there are other episodes either missing or too damaged for future airing, the latter of which are most likely held only for research purposes.

According to Ted Emery, it was not just episodes of Countdown that were affected by the purge. A number of Australian Rules Football Grand Final games, along with episodes of Bellbird and Certain Women, were also erased.

In recent years, ABC Archives has undertaken an upgrade of the remaining episodes, copying what was left to its two on-air playback formats (Betacam SP and Digital Betacam). It is the copying of the programs onto this format that has allowed the ABC to re-broadcast episodes of Countdown during its all-night music show, Rage, in place of video clips which would normally air during that timeslot.

Missing-episode enthusiast Troy Walters has a website Turning Back Time: The Hunt For ABC's Countdown, which discusses what has been lost and found.

== Countdown Revolution era ==
From 3 July 1989 to December 1990, Countdown returned in the guise of Countdown Revolution. Without Meldrum, who had since gone on to Hey Hey It's Saturday, it featured a group of young hosts, including Tania Lacy and Mark Little. The duo were fired by the ABC after an unauthorised on-air protest on 22 June 1990 against the policy of not allowing acts to perform live and insisting they mime to backup tracks. The show continued until its cancellation in December 1990. It also played once a month in Sydney at the Artransa Studios in Frenchs Forest.

The program aired 6:30 weeknights for 30 mins. On Friday nights, the top 10 biggest-selling songs in Australia was counted down (using information from the ARIA Chart). Video clips were generally shown, but memorable appearances live on stage included Poison ("Nothin' but a Good Time"), Faith No More ("Epic"), Kylie Minogue ("Hand on Your Heart" and "Never Too Late"), Jason Donovan ("Sealed with a Kiss"), Collette ("All I Wanna Do Is Dance" and "That's What I Like About You"), Brother Beyond ("He Ain't No Competition"), Indecent Obsession ("Say Goodbye"), Martika ("I Feel The Earth Move"), James Freud ("One Fine Day") and many more. The performance of Epic would show Faith No More singer Mike Patton freeze and pull funny faces that would clearly show that the group were lip syncing.

The hour-long Batdance competition was a high-rating show in November 1989, where Molly Meldrum aided in the judging of the talent from the state finalists.

The ABC's late-night continuous music show Rage replayed old episodes of Countdown Revolution in January 2012, and again in January 2015, including the first episode from 1989.

The Countdown Magazine continued to be published during the run of Countdown Revolution.

== 40th anniversary ==
Countdown, the show that epitomised the pop music scene in Australia for over a decade, celebrated the 40th anniversary of its debut with the release of an anthology album in 2014. A two-part 40th Anniversary TV special, "Countdown: Do Yourself A Favour", was broadcast on Sunday 16 November 2014. It was hosted by Julia Zemiro and included a guest appearance by Prince Charles. At the ARIA Music Awards of 2014 in November, both Countdown and Meldrum were inducted into the ARIA Hall of Fame – the first time a non-performing artist was inducted.

== "Molly" television drama ==
A two-part documentary-drama about the life of Meldrum and his experiences with Countdown was created by Channel 7 in 2016. Episode one aired on 7 February 2016, while episode two aired on 14 February 2016. Australian actor Samuel Johnson starred as Meldrum, with Tom O'Sullivan as Shrimpton and T.J. Power as Weekes. It tells of the rise and fall of Countdown, its production struggles and various other tales about the music groups that went on it. The show received predominantly positive ratings, with 1.79 million viewers watching episode one and 1.52 million viewers watching episode two.

== Rage: Countdown ==
The show lived up to its name when it angered devoted viewers by slashing its top 50 in mid-2006 and playing videos freeform. But nearly a decade after that controversial decision, a new segment called "The Chart" hit the silver screen. Rage now regularly plays chart hits with a 'Countdown' of the most popular videos from the ARIA singles

== Classic Countdown ==
On 17 September 2017, the ABC commenced airing a retrospective of the show, comprising 13 one hour episodes. Each episode focused on one year from 1975 to 1987, showcasing live performances from the show, interviews and Molly's Humdrum. Voice over narration is supplied by recording artists who appeared on the show. The show was programmed to air in Countdown's original Sunday 6pm slot.

== New Year's Eve: Countdown Live ==
For the 2017 Sydney New Year's Eve live show and broadcast on the ABC, there was a countdown to midnight and the fireworks. The show was themed like the Countdown show, with many live artists including Casey Donovan, Jimmy Barnes, Phil Jamieson, Isiah Firebrace and more. The show had the Countdown theme song and some of the same graphics. Ian "Molly" Meldrum did not return to host. The stage also had the Countdown logo.

== 50th anniversary ==
A 50th anniversary special, "Countdown 50 Years On", was broadcast on Saturday 16 November 2024 on ABC. It was hosted by Myf Warhurst and Tony Armstrong.

== Compilation albums ==
A series of popular CD compilations have been released by ABC Music, with selective tracks as featured on the original series.

Title	Album details	Chart positions	Certifications (sales thresholds)
Title	Album details	AUS	Certifications (sales thresholds)
Countdown Silver Jubilee Australian Top 20	Released: November 1977; Label: The Silver Jubilee Committee Organisation, EMI Music (SCA 020); Formats: LP, Cassette	50	
Ten Years of Countdown – An Australian Collection	Released: 1984; Label: ABC, Festival Records (RMC 55001/2); Formats: 2× LP, 2× Cassette, VHS		
Countdown	Released: 2006; Label: ABC Music (0-642-590443); Formats: 2×CD; Note: Interviews with Molly Meldrum		
Countdown The Wonder Years	Released: July 2006; Label: Liberation Music (LIBCD8209.2); Formats: 3×CD, 2×DVD	2^{°}	ARIA: 2×Platinum (DVD)
The Countdown Collection – Legends the Early Years	Released: September 2006; Label: ABC Music, Warner Music Australia (5101128872); Formats: CD+DVD	16^{°}	ARIA: Gold (DVD)
The Countdown Spectacular Live	Released: November 2006; Label: Liberation Music (LIBCD8228.2); Formats: 3×CD, 2×DVD	44; 2^{°}	ARIA: 2×Platinum (DVD)
Countdown The Wonder Years 2	Released: May 2007; Label: Liberation Music (LIBCD9233.2); Formats: 3×CD, 2×DVD	2^{°}	ARIA: Platinum (DVD)
The Countdown Spectacular Live 2	Released: December 2007; Label: Liberation Music (LIBCD9254.2); Formats: 3×CD, 3×DVD	99; 14^{°}	
Countdown One Hit Wonders	Released: May 2008; Label: Liberation Music (LMCD0001); Formats: 2×CD+DVD		
Countdown One Hit Wonders 2	Released: October 2008; Label: Liberation Music (LMCD0020); Formats: 3×CD, 2×DVD	5^{°}	ARIA: Gold (DVD)
Countdown: Jukebox Classics	Released: 2009; Label: Liberation Music (LMCD0086); Formats: 3×CD		
Countdown: Disco Anthems	Released: July 2010; Label: Liberation Music (LMCD0099); Formats: 2×CD		
Countdown 40th Anniversary	Released: November 2014; Label: ABC Music, Universal Music Australia (535 5771); Formats: 2×CD		
Countdown 40th Anniversary Continues	Released: 2015; Label: ABC Music, Universal Music Australia (535 9448); Formats: 2×CD		
Countdown Rock!	Released: 2015; Label: ABC Music, Universal Music Australia (536 2259); Formats: 2×CD		
Countdown Pop!	Released: April 2016; Label: ABC Music, Universal Music Australia (536 8761); Formats: 2×CD		
Classic Countdown	Released: 2017; Label: ABC Music, Universal Music Australia (537 9257); Formats: 4×CD		
Countdown: Live at The Sydney Opera House	Released: 2018; Label: ABC Music, Universal Music Australia (674 8097); Formats: 2×CD+DVD		

Notes

- ° Australian DVD Compilation Chart.

== See also ==
- List of Australian music television shows
- List of Australian television series
- List of programs broadcast by ABC (Australian TV network)
- Top of the Pops, the British equivalent, aired on BBC One from 1964 to 2006.
