= Blake Foster =

American actor (born 1985)

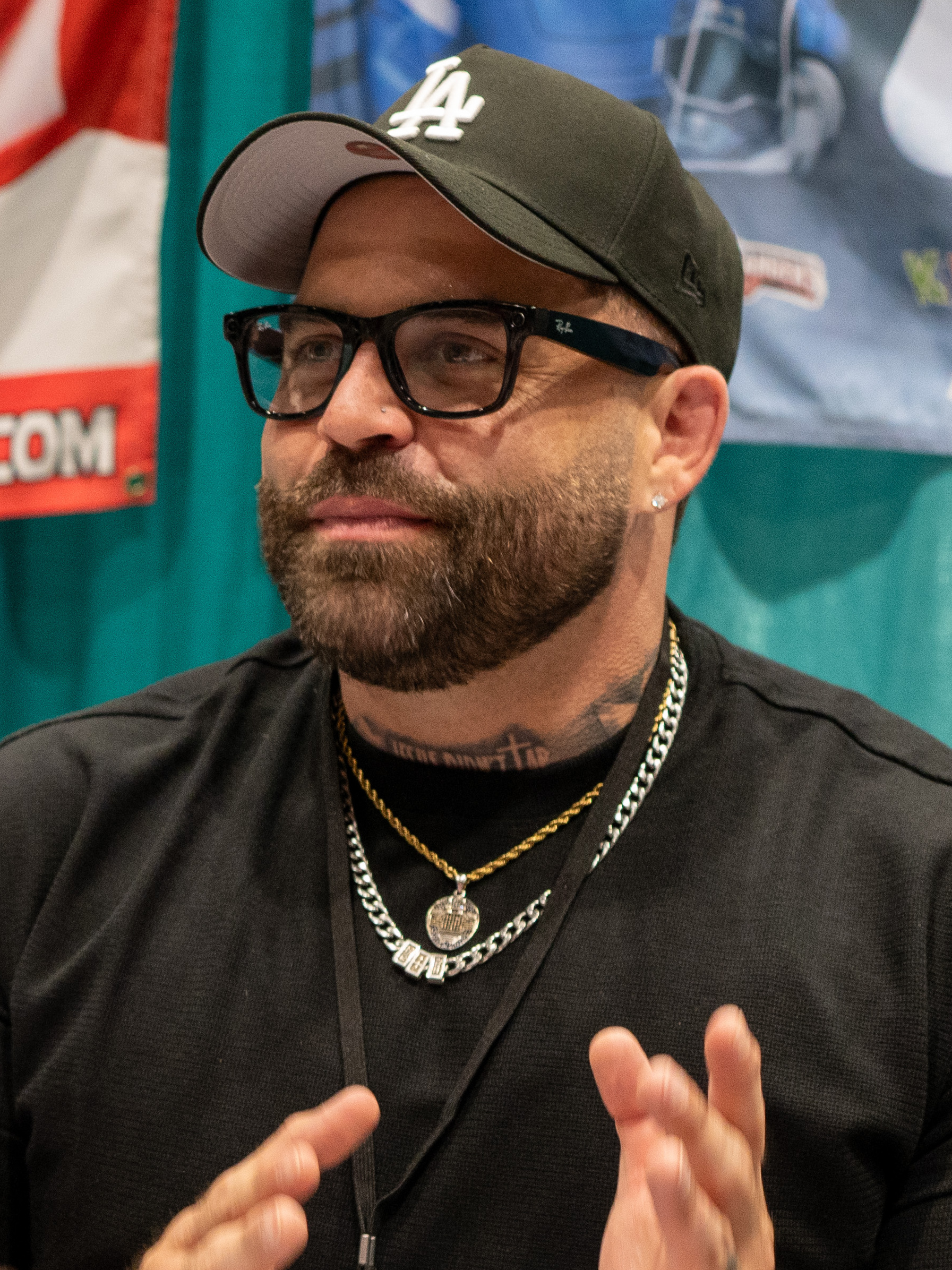
- Foster at GalaxyCon Oklahoma City in 2025
- Born: Blake Anthony Foster; May 29, 1985 (age 41); Northridge, Los Angeles, California, U.S.
- Occupation: Actor
- Years active: 1993–present
- Partner: Katie Needham
- Children: 2

Blake Anthony Foster (born May 29, 1985) is an American actor.

== Early life ==
Foster was born in Northridge, Los Angeles, the oldest of two children to Patricia (née Balasko) and John Foster, an Elvis impersonator and window cleaner.

== Career ==
In 1995, he was one of the stars in the movie Above Suspicion starring Christopher Reeve, Joe Mantegna and Kim Cattrall. He is perhaps best known for his role as Justin Stewart, the child who assumed the mantle of the Blue Turbo Ranger in the fifth season of Fox Kids' Power Rangers Turbo, making his debut for the show in the film Turbo: A Power Rangers Movie. Foster reprised the role in an episode of Power Rangers in Space.

In the same time, he was starred in two successful movies Casper Meets Wendy (1998) and Rusty: A Dog's Tale (1998).

In 2017, he starred in the short film The Order, along with Power Rangers alumni Austin St. John, Catherine Sutherland, David Yost, Johnny Yong Bosch, Paul Schrier, Karan Ashley, Steve Cardenas, Erin Cahill, Walter Emanuel Jones, Nakia Burrise, Hilary Shepard Turner, Dan Southworth, Alyson Sullivan, Deborah Estelle Phillips and Azim Rizk.

== Filmography ==
=== Film ===
- Street Knight (1993) .... (uncredited)
- Above Suspicion (1995) .... Damon Cain
- Turbo: A Power Rangers Movie (1997) .... Justin Stewart (Blue Turbo Ranger)
- Casper Meets Wendy (1998) .... Josh Jackson
- Rusty: A Dog's Tale (1998) .... Jory
- Kids World (2001) .... Ryan Mitchell
- Drifter TKD (2008) .... Jesse Tyler
- A Life Untitled (2015) .... Jimmy's Boss (V.O.)
- The Order (2017) .... Mason
- Kung Fu Drifter (2022) .... Jesse Tyler

=== TV ===
- Beverly Hills, 90210
  - Episode: "Midlife... Now What?" (1993).... Kevin Walsh McKay (Brenda and Dylan's imaginary older son)
- Family Album (1994) .... Young Lionel (uncredited)
- Boy Meets World
  - Episode: "The Pink Flamingo Kid" (1996) .... Danny
- Power Rangers Turbo (1997, 45 episodes) .... Justin Stewart (Blue Turbo Ranger) / Robot Justin
- Power Rangers in Space (1998, Episode: "True Blue to the Rescue") .... Justin Stewart (Blue Turbo Ranger)
- Power Rangers: The Lost Episode (1999)...Justin Stewart (special episode/archival footage)
- Walker, Texas Ranger
  - Episode: "The Children of Halloween" (1998).... Joey Williams
- Two of a Kind
  - Episode: "Carrie Moves In" (1999) .... Carter
- The Brady Bunch in the White House (2002, TV Movie) .... Peter Brady
- Skater Boys (2006) .... Mike
  - Episode: "Sundown"
  - Episode: "Sex and Candy"
- What's Stevie Thinking? (2007, TV Pilot).... Mark Lanalampi

=== Voice ===
- Turbo: A Power Rangers Movie (1997) .... Justin Stewart (When Morphed)
- Power Rangers Turbo (1997) .... Justin Stewart (When Morphed) / Blue Shadow Ranger
- Power Rangers in Space (1998) .... Justin Stewart (When Morphed)

== Awards ==
Awards and nominations in film and television
Year	Award	Category	Title of work	Medium	Result
1998	Young Artist Award	Best Performance in a Feature Film - Leading Young Actor	Turbo: A Power Rangers Movie	Film	Nominated
2002	Young Artist Award	Best Performance in a Feature Film - Leading Young Actor	Kids World	Film	Nominated
