= Penny Black (film) =

- Directed by: Joe Hitchcock
- Written by: Fiona Jackson; Joe Hitchcock
- Produced by: Fiona Jackson
- Starring: Astra McLaren, Anton Tennet, Toni Garson, Sash Nixon
- Cinematography: Ben Woollen
- Edited by: Brad Davison
- Music by: Jeremy Mayall
- Release date: 2015
- Running time: 85 mins
- Country: New Zealand
- Language: English

Penny Black is a 2015 New Zealand independent comedy film produced by Fiona Jackson, and directed by Joe Hitchcock.

== Plot ==
Beautiful Penny Black rose to fame as the face of Ubernu, the mega-corporation taking over the world. Penny likes the high life, expensive clothes, and fancy restaurants, but she just became guardian for her sister, Alex. She's 18 going on 8, always dresses like her favourite superhero, Lapwing, and she's driving Penny crazy! When she inadvertently sabotages a photoshoot, drives Penny into a public rage, and puts Penny's modelling career in jeopardy, she panics and heads for Wellington to try to win her job back.

Without anywhere to leave Alex she reluctantly packs her in the car, too, and they hit the road, cruising south till Penny accidentally plants the car into a paddock. Luckily, Guy, a charismatic activist picks them up and offers to take them both to Wellington.

Guy is smart, charming and has a different way of looking at the world, and Penny soon warms to his apple tree planting, dumpster diving, billboard altering ways.

But in the middle of their mayhem, adventure, and bending the law, things start to go wrong...

== Cast ==
- Astra McLaren as Penny Black
- Anton Tennet as Guy
- Toni Garson as Alex Black
- Sash Nixon as Lapwing
- Ross MacLeod as Henchmen

== Production ==
Penny Black features a core cast of three, and went into pre-production in October 2011. The film was completed in 2015 and premiered at the Arohanui Film festival in Te Aroha. Sponsors included Wicked Campers, Phoenix Organic and Whittakers with funding topped up by a PledgeMe campaign.

Penny Black was filmed on RED Scarlet from July–Oct 2012 in Auckland, Pukekohe, Hamilton, Te Aroha, Taupō, Napier, and Wellington, New Zealand.

The role of Penny's sister, Alex Black, was originally a male role, but when finding an actor with availability throughout the filming period became difficult the production team started to consider changing the role to a sister. When they found Toni, a Te Aroha College student, they decided she was perfect for the role and rewrote the script to suit her.

During production Astra McLaren became vegan which she attributes partly to the theme of Penny Black opening her eyes and giving her time to think about issues she already knew were there.

A short film entitled 'Lapwing' was made to be used within the narrative of Penny Black, and to provide back story for the superhero character. It was largely shot on the grounds of the University of Waikato, Hamilton, New Zealand.

== See also ==
- Penny Black, the world's first adhesive postage stamp, issued in 1840
