= Anton Tennet =

New Zealand actor

- Born: 6 February 1987 (age 39); Auckland, New Zealand
- Years active: 1998–Present

Anton Tennet (born 6 February 1987) is an actor from New Zealand. He is known for his roles in New Zealand and Australian TV shows and movies. He is the older brother of Olivia Tennet, an actress, and Emma Tennet, a dancer.

Variety wrote of his performance in Mega Time Squad: "more is more as far as Tennet is concerned – the effects that allow multiple Johns in the frame are no less impressive than the actor’s ability to keep them all equally, endearingly dim." A critic from Metro magazine wrote, in reviewing a play based on Lord of the Flies, "Tennet’s Simon as the outsider who suffers from his unwillingness to join the herd does a great deal with physical expression to fill out sparse lines."

== Filmography ==
Film
Year	Title	Role	Notes
2001	Ozzie	Darryl	
2001	Her Majesty	Robert Davies	
2001	Kids World	Stu	
2002	Grace		Short film
2003	Mercy Peak	Karl	Episode: "Fork in the Road"
2004	Maiden Voyage	Zach	TV movie
2004	Power Rangers Dino Thunder	Soccer Buddy	Episode: "Triassic Triumph"
2005	Outrageous Fortune	Kid	Episode: "Foul Deeds Will Rise"
2007	September	Tom	
2008	Legend of the Seeker	Liam	Episode: "Bounty"
2010	Avalon High	Matt	TV movie
2012	Slugs and Snails		Short Film
2013	Romeo and Juliet: A Love Song	Benvolio	
2015	Penny Black	Guy Dubord	
2020	Mega Time Squad	John	

== Theatre ==
Year	Title	Role	Notes
1998	Shadowlands	Douglas	Dolphin Theatre (May–June 1998)
2013	Lord of the Flies	Simon	
