= Deathgasm =

- Film poster
- Directed by: Jason Lei Howden
- Written by: Jason Lei Howden
- Produced by: Sarah Howden; Andrew Beattie; Morgan Leigh Stewart
- Starring: Milo Cawthorne; James Blake; Kimberley Crossman; Sam Berkley; Daniel Cresswell
- Cinematography: Simon Raby
- Edited by: Jeff Hurrell
- Music by: Chris van de Geer; Joost Langeveld
- Production companies: MPI Media Group; New Zealand Film Commission; Timpson Films
- Distributed by: Dark Sky Films
- Release dates: 15 March 2015 (SXSW); 2 October 2015 (United States)
- Running time: 86 minutes
- Country: New Zealand
- Language: English

Deathgasm is a 2015 New Zealand dark comedy supernatural horror film written and directed by Jason Lei Howden in his feature directorial debut. The film stars Milo Cawthorne, James Blake, Kimberley Crossman with Sam Berkley and Daniel Cresswel, follows the title teenage heavy metal band who acquire an ancient piece of sheet music and unwittingly summon an evil entity known as "The Blind One".

Deathgasm premiered at South by Southwest on 14 March 2015, and was theatrically released in the United States on 2 October 2015 to positive reviews from critics.

== Plot ==
After the institutionalization of his mother, teenager Brodie is forced to live with his Uncle Albert in Greypoint. However, Brodie's love for metal music clashes with Uncle Albert's strict Christian beliefs. To make matters worse, he faces constant bullying at school, particularly from his cousin David. Brodie's only solace comes from his geeky friends Dion and Giles.

Everything changes when Brodie meets another metal enthusiast named Zakk, and the two form a band called Deathgasm. They are later joined by Dion and Giles, and together they embark on a musical journey. One day, Zakk convinces Brodie to explore an abandoned house in search of a legendary metal musician named Rikki Daggers. They stumble upon Daggers, who hands them a mysterious album before being killed by a man named Vadin.

It turns out that Vadin is a member of a cult seeking the Black Hymn, an ancient piece of sheet music capable of summoning demons. When Brodie discovers the Black Hymn hidden inside the album, Deathgasm decides to play it. The song causes strange occurrences, including Uncle Albert's terrifying reaction. Brodie realises something is amiss and stops playing.

Meanwhile, Brodie's romantic life takes an unexpected turn when the beautiful Medina shows interest in him. They go on a date, but Brodie's shyness prevents him from making a move. However, tensions arise when Zakk intercepts a note from Medina to Brodie and lies about his disinterest in her, culminating in a kiss between Zakk and Medina.

As Brodie delves deeper into the Black Hymn's meaning, he discovers its connection to dark forces and the possession of the town's residents by Aeloth, a powerful demon. Seeking answers, Brodie and Zakk consult a fortune teller named Abigail, who reveals the demonic presence and the impending merging of Aeloth with the most evil human in town by 3 AM.

With the help of Dion, Giles, and Medina, Brodie and Zakk attempt to undo the summoning by playing the Black Hymn in reverse. Their journey leads them to face the cult members and their leader, Aeon, who is eventually killed by his acolyte Shanna. Despite setbacks, the group manages to acquire the sheet music and heads to Daggers' house to perform the song with his amplifiers.

However, the cult captures Deathgasm, and Shanna tears apart the sheets. Zakk, remorseful for his betrayal, saves his bandmates, and together they disrupt the cult's ritual. Brodie attempts to play the reversed Black Hymn, but the demons kill Dion and Giles, leaving him unable to finish in time. Aeloth possesses Shanna's body but is quickly dispatched by Zakk.

Realizing that completing the hymn is impossible, Brodie resorts to playing intense heavy metal music instead. This causes Aeloth to temporarily retreat from Zakk's body. Zakk urges Brodie to kill him to prevent Aeloth's resurrection, sacrificing himself to save his friends and the town.

Months later, Brodie and Medina are happily together, bonded by their love for death metal. Zakk's spirit returns through one of Brodie's records, and they engage in a conversation about the afterlife.

== Cast ==
- Milo Cawthorne as Brodie
- James Blake as Zakk
- Kimberley Crossman as Medina
- Sam Berkley as Dion
- Daniel Cresswell as Giles
- Delaney Tabron as Shanna
- Stephen Ure as Rikki Daggers
- Tim Foley as Vadin
- Kate Elliott as Abigail
- Nick Hoskins-Smith as David
- Colin Moy as Uncle Albert
- Jodie Rimmer as Aunt Mary
- Erroll Shand as Byron
- Andrew Laing as Aeon
- Aaron McGregor as Terry
- Cameron Rhodes as Mr. Cappenhurst
- Campbell Rousselle as Ron
- Paula Hallagher as Brodie's Mum

== Production ==
Howden took inspiration from his teenage years, in which he was a social outcast and fan of heavy metal music. The film won the 2013 Make My Horror Movie contest and received a NZ$200,000 prize to go toward production, which took place in mid-2014. Executive producer Ant Timpson cited Howden's "sheer enthusiasm and utter commitment" as to why it won.

== Reception ==
On the review aggregator website Rotten Tomatoes, 88% of 33 critics' reviews are positive. The website's consensus reads: "Deathgasm plumbs the blood-spattered depths of grindhouse gore with enough giddy glee to satisfy genre enthusiasts looking for a thrill." Metacritic, which uses a weighted average, assigned the film a score of 65 out of 100, based on 10 critics, indicating "generally favorable" reviews.

Dennis Harvey of Variety wrote that the script does not live up the vivid splatter effects, but the film's "consistent if undiscriminating high energy engenders a certain persuasive goodwill". Richard Whittaker of The Austin Chronicle wrote, "Shamelessly low-brow, reaching a beer-fueled gleeful high with a zombie-vs.-sex toys battle, it's a very metal tribute to the grand tradition of Kiwi splatter comedies."

At Bloody Disgusting, Brad Miska and Patrick Cooper reviewed the film, and both rated it four out of five stars. Miska called it "the most metal horror film ever", and Cooper said that it was "the movie the SXSW Midnighters category was created for". Drew Tinnin of Dread Central rated it 4 out of 5 stars and wrote, "Deathgasm knows exactly what it is and where its heart is, giving genre fans a welcome return to heavy metal in horror without cutting back on any of the splatstick that New Zealand has become known for, for better or worse." Zach Gayne of Twitch Film wrote, "[T]he voice that shines through the hysterical dialogue and playfully comic editing, is so teenage, so punk, it makes a beat-to-death genre feel refreshing." Heather Wixson of Daily Dead rated it 5 out of 5 stars and called it a "ridiculously fun and bombastic celebration of horror and heavy metal".
In early 2016,

Walmart refused to sell Deathgasm in its current form. Walmart renamed the film to a more 'acceptable' title, Heavy Metal Apocalypse.

=== Accolades ===
Nominated for a Fangoria Chainsaw Award, Best Makeup FX/Creature Design

Toronto After Dark Film Festival
Best Feature Film – Anchor Bay Entertainment Audience Choice Award Winner: Gold
Best Special Effects
Best Music
Best Title Sequence
Best Trailer
Best Film To Watch With A Crowd
Best Kill (Death by Sex Toy)
Best Gore
Best Screening Q&A
Knoxville Horror Film Festival
Palm D'Gore
Best Director: Jason Lei Howden
Total Film Frightfest
Best Gore for Dildos & chainsaws
Festival de cine de Terror de Molins de Rei
Best Feature Film
Best Actor: Milo Cawthorne
Razor Reel Flanders Film Festival
Audience Award
HARD LINE Film Festival, Germany
Audience Award
L'Absurde Séance Film Festival
Audience Award
Arizona Underground Film Festival
Audience Award

== Sequel ==
A sequel, titled Deathgasm Part 2: Goremageddon, was revealed on 16 December 2015 to be in production. On the topic of Goremaggedon, Jason Lei Howden said that "There is literally more gore in the first 10 minutes than the entire first Deathgasm. If you kinda liked the first, this will make your head implode. If you thought the first Deathgasm was puerile, juvenile and dumb, then Goremageddon will melt your face off and force you to barricade yourself inside, safe with some Terrence Malick and Coldplay." On January 31, 2021, Howden tweeted that the film was rejected by the New Zealand Film Commission board so the production would not go ahead.

In September 2023, a Kickstarter campaign to create Deathgasm 2 - Goremageddon was launched. The campaign ended in October 2023 and surpassed its $300,000 goal and earned $325,554.
