= Kenneth del Vecchio =

American film producer

- Born: New Jersey
- Occupations: Lawyer, politician, filmmaker
- Years active: late 1990s-present
- Notable work: The Life Zone

Kenneth del Vecchio is an American lawyer, politician, and filmmaker. He has written, produced, directed and acted in over 30 films. He is founder and chairman of the Hoboken International Film Festival. He also is the author of several legal books, including criminal codebooks published by Prentice Hall and ALM. He is a novelist, who penned his first published novel as a 24-year-old law student. He is the owner of the Criminal Law Learning Center and a former part-time New Jersey municipal judge.

== Career ==
Prior to working in film, del Vecchio earned a Juris Doctor degree through Temple University law school and was admitted to the bar in 1994. He began writing while in college, during which time he published his first novel. In 2001 del Vecchio wrote, produced, and performed in The Rules (for Men), which he based on a novel he wrote. His next film, Pride and Loyalty, marked his directorial debut. He would go on to star, produce, and write in several more films; as of 2024 he has only directed an additional three films, Tinsel Town, The Drum Beats Twice, and 4 Presidents. In 2005 del Vecchio launched the Hoboken International Film Festival (HIFF). He also helped found Justice for All Productions, through which he releases his films.

In 2010 del Vecchio contacted the New Jersey Supreme Court's Advisory Committee on Extrajudicial Affairs requesting that they review whether or not his filmmaking career would conflict with his work as a municipal court judge in North Arlington. The committee advised del Vecchio that the promotion of his films could be viewed as improper. In order to avoid issue, del Vecchio resigned from his position. The advisory ruling focused on three of del Vecchio's films, O.B.A.M. Nude, Fake, and An Affirmative Act.

The following year del Vecchio wrote, produced, and starred in The Life Zone, a pro-life horror film that focuses on three pregnant women who were kidnapped while seeking abortions, only to learn that they were instead brought to Hell. Two of the women choose not to pursue an abortion and are able to escape, while the third does not and is forced to undergo a never ending loop of pregnancy and childbirth. The movie was the focus of criticism from outlets such as Ms. magazine, which also noted that it received attention from Stephen Colbert. Erin Harrington noted that although del Vecchio tried to frame the film as non-partisan, marketing material advertised the film's ending as anti-abortion. She further wrote that there is no mention of what happens to the third woman's children and that "for all the emphasis upon foetal subjectivity and the rights of the unborn, they are ultimately elided in the name of cosmic retribution."

== Political career ==
In 2012 del Vecchio was nominated as the New Jersey Libertarian candidate for the United States Senate, which he lost to John Driscoll, Jr.. He chose to run again in 2016, but was again unsuccessful.

== Filmography ==
=== Film ===
Year	Title	Director	Writer	Producer	Actor	Role	Notes
2001	The Rules (for Men)	No	Yes	Yes	Yes	Armando Soul	Also based on his novel
2002	Pride and Loyalty	Yes	Yes	Yes	Yes	Thug #1	Also based on his novel
2005	Tinsel Town	Yes	Yes	Yes	Yes	Sebastian King	
2005	Lovesick	No	No	No	Yes	Attorney	
2007	Polycarp	No	Yes	Yes	Yes	Bob Hathaway / The Figure	
2008	The Drum Beats Twice	Yes	Yes	Yes	Yes	John Carreck	
2008	Break	No	No	No	Yes	The Bodyguard	
2008	¡Murders	No	Yes	Yes	No	—N/a	
2008	O.B.A.M Nude	No	Yes	Yes	Yes	O.B.A.M	
2010	Three Chris's	No	Yes	Yes	Yes	Mario Vigilante	
2010	An Affirmative Act	No	Yes	Yes	Yes	Nick	
2011	Fake	No	No	Yes	No	—N/a	
2011	The Grand Theft	Yes	Yes	Yes	Yes	Mueller	
2011	The Great Fight	No	Yes	Yes	Yes	Judge DeMitro	
2011	The Life Zone	No	Yes	Yes	Yes	Barry	
2013	Real Gangsters	No	No	Yes	No	—N/a	
2014	Snapshot	No	No	Yes	Yes	Max Grunberg	
2014	Scavenger Killers	No	Yes	Yes	Yes	Agent Truman	
2015	Bleeding Story	No	Yes	Yes	Yes	Judge DeMitro	
2015	The Last Apartment	No	No	No	Yes	Jameson	
2015	Rock Story	No	Yes	Yes	Yes	Judge Spinelli	
2016	Aberrant	No	No	Yes	No	—N/a	
2016	Joker's Poltergeist	No	Yes	Yes	Yes	Bob Nash	
2016	Hospital Arrest	No	Yes	Yes	Yes	Xavier PD	
2017	Cries of the Unborn	No	Yes	Yes	Yes	Barry	
2017	Price for Freedom	No	Yes	Yes	Yes	Carter Chief of Staff	
2018	Renaissance Man	No	Yes	Yes	Yes	Ken	Documentary
2018	The Brawler	No	No	Executive	Yes	Roger	
2019	The Savant	No	Yes	Yes	Yes	Judge DeMitro	
2019	A Karate Christmas Miracle	No	Yes	Yes	Yes	Bob Genesis	
2019	Blue Lives Matters	No	Yes	Yes	Yes	Brandis Weson	
2020	4 Presidents	Yes	Yes	Yes	Yes	Historical Figures 3	Documentary
2020	A Wrestling Christmas Miracle	No	Yes	Yes	Yes	Ajax Gabriel / Agent Truman	

==== Executive producer only ====
- Alone in the Dark II (2008)
- Here and There (2009)
- The Crimson Mask (2009)

=== Television ===
Year	Title	Writer	Producer	Actor	Role	Notes
2013	Shwabby Run	Yes	Yes	Yes	Kenny D	TV series
2014	Nobody	No	Yes	Yes	Richie Raffolini	TV movie
2018	Puppets	No	Yes	No	—N/a	TV movie

== Bibliography ==
- Pride & Loyalty (1997)
- Revelation in the Wilderness (2000)
- New Jersey Code of Criminal Justice: A Practical Guide (2004)
- 2009 New Jersey Code of Criminal Justice: A Practical Guide (2005)
- Prentince Hall's Test Prep Guide to Accompany New Jersey Code of Criminal Justice (2006)
- 2008 New Jersey Code of Criminal Justice: A Practical Guide (2007)
- Code of Criminal Justice: A Practical Guide to the Penal Statues (2008)
- New York Code of Criminal Justice: A Practical Guide 2010 (2009)
- The Great Heist (2011)
- New Jersey Code of Criminal Justice: A Practical Guide 2015 (2016)
- New Jersey Code of Criminal Justice: A Practical Guide 2017 (2017)
- New York Code of Criminal Justice: A Practical Guide 2017 (2017)
- New Jersey Code of Criminal Justice: A Practical Guide 2018 (2018)
- New York Code of Criminal Justice: A Practical Guide 2018 (2018)
- New Jersey Code of Criminal Justice: A Practical Guide 2019 (2019)
