= When We Go to War =

2015 television drama miniseries

- Genre: Drama
- Created by: Gavin Strawhan; Briar Grace-Smith
- Written by: Gavin Strawhan; Briar Grace-Smith; Rachel Lang
- Directed by: Peter Burger
- Starring: Esther Stephens; Shavaughn Ruakere; Alexander Tarrant; Ido Drent; Freya Milner; Tom O'Sullivan; Leith Towers; Andrew Grainger; Sylvia Rands; Gareth Williams; Sophia Hybens
- Composer: Tom McLeod
- Country of origin: New Zealand
- Original language: English
- No. of episodes: 6

Production
- Producers: Robin Scholes; Gavin Strawhan
- Cinematography: DJ Stipsen
- Editor: Eric de Beus
- Production companies: Jump Film & TV

Original release
- Network: TV One
- Release: 26 April – 24 May 2015

When We Go to War is a 2015 television drama miniseries from New Zealand directed by Peter Burger. The series uses fictional characters to depict the impact of the First World War on New Zealanders at home as well as in the New Zealand Expeditionary Force during the Gallipoli Campaign and in Egypt. The series premiered in 2015, the centenary year of the Gallipoli campaign, with its first two episodes aired together during the ANZAC day holiday weekend.

== Production ==
The six one-hour episodes were commissioned and broadcast by TVNZ. Each episode is framed around a letter written by one of six young men and women, who, in 1914 on the eve of World War I, are full of plans and dreams. Studio filming was undertaken at Studio West in West Auckland.

== Episodes ==
No.	Title	Directed by	Written by	Original release date	N.Z. viewers (millions)
1	"Bea's Letter"	Peter Burger	Gavin Strawhan	26 April 2015	314,820
2	"Manaaki's Letter"	Peter Burger	Briar Grace-Smith, Rachel Lang and Gavin Strawhan	26 April 2015	314,820
3	"Harry's Letter"	Peter Burger	Gavin Strawhan, Briar Grace-Smith and Rachel Lang	3 May 2015	305,820
4	"Awa's Letter"	Peter Burger	Rachel Lang	10 May 2015	273,310
5	"Charles' Letter"	Peter Burger	Gavin Strawhan	17 May 2015	267,450
6	"Cissy's Letter"	Peter Burger	Rachel Lang	24 May 2015	284,840
