= Power Rangers RPM =

American teen action television series

- Genre: Action-adventure; Science fiction Cyberpunk; Dystopian
- Created by: Haim Saban; Toei Company, Ltd.
- Based on: Engine Sentai Go-onger by Toei Company, Ltd.
- Developed by: ABC; The Walt Disney Company; Saban Capital Group; Toei Company, Ltd.
- Showrunners: Eddie Guzelian; Judd Lynn
- Directed by: Mike Smith; Jonathan Brough; Vanessa Alexander; Charlie Haskell; Peter Salmon
- Starring: See "Cast"
- Narrated by: Olivia Tennet
- Theme music composer: Brad Hamilton
- Composers: Leigh Roberts; Wayne Jones; William J. Sullivan
- Countries of origin: United States; Japan
- Original language: English
- No. of episodes: 32

Production
- Executive producers: Koichi Sakamoto; Eddie Guzelian; Judd Lynn
- Producers: Sally Campbell; Charles Knight; Jackie Marchand
- Production locations: New Zealand (Auckland Region) (Auckland); Japan (Greater Tokyo Area) (Tokyo, Saitama, Yokohama) and Kyoto)
- Cinematography: Neil Cervin
- Camera setup: Single-camera
- Running time: 22 minutes
- Production companies: BVS Entertainment; Renaissance Atlantic Entertainment; Toei Company, Ltd. Ranger Productions, Ltd.

Original release
- Network: ABC (ABC Kids)
- Release: March 7 – December 26, 2009

Related
- Power Rangers television series

Power Rangers RPM is a television series and the sixteenth entry of the Power Rangers franchise, and is an adaptation of Engine Sentai Go-onger, the thirty-second Japanese Super Sentai series.

The season was the eighth and final to air on ABC stations. RPM was also the final season to be produced and distributed by BVS Entertainment and Renaissance-Atlantic Entertainment, putting the series on a one-year hiatus until the premiere of Power Rangers Samurai in 2011.

Power Rangers Beast Morphers (2019), which was produced by the franchise's current owner Hasbro, through its Allspark Entertainment Division, was its direct sequel.

== Story ==
An AI computer virus named Venjix takes over all of the Earth's computers, creates an army of robot "Grinder" droids and destroys or enslaves almost all of humanity. Only the domed city of Corinth remains, protected by an almost impenetrable force field from the toxic atmosphere of the wasteland outside. To combat Venjix's encroaching evil, the mysterious Doctor K creates the RPM Power Rangers to fight him off, recruiting Air Force pilot Scott Truman, hero obsessed mechanic Flynn McAllistair, and reformed airhead socialite Summer Landsdown to operate their weapons and gear. Later, Doctor K recruits Dillon, a rebellious drifter whom Venjix had experimented on, and Ziggy Grover, an inept thief whom Dillon begrudgingly befriended, as 'Series Black and Green'.

During their fight against Venjix, Dillon attempts to recover his memories of his life before being experimented upon, eventually leading him to discover that Venjix's general Tenaya was actually his sister; his attempts to get her to rebel against Venjix are met with resistance not only from Tenaya, but also Venjix, who has her upgraded in order to suppress her remaining humanity. It is also revealed that Doctor K was the one who created Venjix, having intended to only use it to escape her confinement in the treacherous Alphabet Soup program along with 'test pilots' Gem and Gemma, but was intercepted before she had a chance to install the safety protocols, allowing Venjix to escape into the outside world. Gem and Gemma are ultimately shown to have survived Venjix's assault on Earth, having recovered the prototype 'Series Gold and Silver' Ranger gear when escaping Alphabet Soup.

Eventually, Venjix, having created a body for himself in order to personally destroy the Rangers, manages to infiltrate and attack Corinth, taking over the city and crippling the Rangers in the process. However, Tenaya eventually defects from Venjix thanks to Dillon and helps fight back, resulting in a building destroying Venjix. In the aftermath, Scott, Gem, and Gemma lead a fighter squad run by Scott's father, Flynn opens up a computer store with his dad, Ziggy and Doctor K intend to open a children's school, and Dillon, Summer, and Tenaya leave Corinth to help rebuild Earth.

== Cast and characters ==
RPM Rangers

- Eka Darville as Scott Truman / Ranger Operator Series Red
- Ari Boyland as Flynn McAllister / Ranger Operator Series Blue
- Rose McIver as Summer Landsdown / Ranger Operator Series Yellow
- Milo Cawthorne as Ziggy Grover / Ranger Operator Series Green
- Dan Ewing as Dillon / Ranger Operator Series Black
- Mike Ginn as Gem / Ranger Operator Series Gold
- Li Ming Hu as Gemma / Ranger Operator Series Silver

Supporting characters

- Olivia Tennet as Dr. K
- James Gaylyn as Colonel Mason Truman
- Damien Avery as Colonel Hicks
- Mia Koning as Vasquez
- Murray Keane as Benny
- Angela Shirley as Clara Landsdown
- Stephen Papps as Martin Landsdown

Villains

- Andrew Laing as the voice of the Venjix Virus
- Adelaide Kane as Tenaya
- Mark Mitchinson as the voice of General Shifter
- Charlie McDermott as the voice of General Crunch
- Leighton Cardno as the voice of General Kilobyte
- John Sumner as Fresno Bob

== Episodes ==
No.	Title	Directed by	Written by	Original release date
1	"The Road to Corinth"	Mike Smith	Eddie Guzelian	March 7, 2009
Everyone on Earth is forced into the domed city of Corinth, for it is their last haven from the computer virus known as Venjix. While everyone makes it safely into Corinth, a mysterious stranger later known as Dillon is seen outside the dome. Trying to find the city of Corinth, a man known as Ziggy Grover offers to take him there. Safely making it inside past Venjix's soldiers, known as Grinders, the city is attacked by a Generation 5 Attack Bot. However, three people: Scott Truman, Ranger Operator Series Red, Flynn McAllistair, Ranger Operator Series Blue, and Summer Landsdown, Ranger Operator Series Yellow, all of whom were previously seen before, step in to take down Venjix's forces. They are known as the Power Rangers.
2	"Fade to Black"	Mike Smith	Eddie Guzelian	March 7, 2009
It is revealed that Dillon is a human who happens to have Venjix's technology inside him, but does not know why. He helps the Rangers defeat the robots, but Colonel Truman (father of Scott Truman) takes them in. Ziggy pretends not to know who Dillon is, and the Rangers find out Venjix's technology in Dillon. Dillon protects Ziggy from inmates when they attack him. The Rangers go to Dillon and ask him to join their team, as long as Dillon can choose his own colour.
3	"Rain"	Mike Smith	Eddie Guzelian	March 14, 2009
Dillon is given a chance to become the Black Ranger, but even after he passes all the tests, he still doesn't want to. After realising he can protect others with power, he accepts the role, but he still has some obstacles to overcome. He accepts this offer on one condition he requests: Ziggy is to be released from the cell which he is kept at - Scott enquires why Dillon wants this condition he has placed in exchange for his acceptance of the Series Black powers to be accepted by the Ranger Operators but his only reason is one that has no sense and thus is a non-warrant for Ziggy's release: Ziggy "can make shadow puppets" - despite this reason that seems to be unworthy of warranting Ziggy's release from the cells, the Operators accept Dillon's condition. Later, he starts his drive away from Corinth before the Rangers' battle with this episode's Venjix Attack-Bot, which is audibly transmitted on the radio, prompting Dillon to reconsider permanently.
4	"Go for the Green"	Jonathan Brough	Jackie Marchand	March 21, 2009
The Rangers begin to search for a candidate for the Ranger Operator Series Green powers. After auditioning several colourful candidates, they give up. After Ziggy's past catches up to him, he encounters a young woman who seems perfect - she turns out to be Tenaya 7 in disguise, who wants to become the Green Ranger herself to destroy the Rangers from within by using the Series Green powers against the Rangers. Ziggy is forced to bond with the Morpher himself as a last resort for stopping the powers from falling into the wrong hands and becoming Ranger Operator Series Green.
5	"Handshake"	Jonathan Brough	John Tellegen	March 28, 2009
Dillon must learn how to use his invincibility shield to further master his Series' powers by understanding Doctor K's explanation of the shield's operation, requiring Dillon to have absolute faith that the shield will safeguard him, but later Tenaya 7 tries to bring down Corinth's shield through her detachable hand's infiltration of the city. Eventually, Dillon starts to use absolute faith as Doctor K instructed, so that his invincibility shield functions successfully against one of Tenaya's blasts. Dillon and Ziggy use their Zords for the first time to help the High Octane Megazord, and Doctor K finally reveals "his" identity as a teenage girl.
6	"Ranger Green"	Jonathan Brough	Eddie Guzelian	April 4, 2009
Ziggy and Doctor K clash as he undergoes training to master his powers' teleportation ability, while a magnetic Venjix monster launches an assault on the city. Ziggy's criminal past is revealed to the Rangers, as is how he angered the cartels by sending black-market medical supplies to an orphanage; Doctor K emerges from the base to save him from being executed by the mobsters, though she remains antagonistic to him.
7	"Ranger Red"	Vanessa Alexander	John Tellegen	April 11, 2009
After fending off a squad of Grinders, Ziggy and Dillon try to summon the Croc Carrier, but it goes out of control and requires rare technology, which only Scott knows about. Scott goes out alone into the desert and tries to get the part from his brother's plane wreckage, but then the newest Attack Bot attacks, leaving Scott in need of being saved by his father, Colonel Truman. Scott delivers Doctor K the engine part, allowing Ziggy and Dillon to form the ValveMax Megazord for the first time and destroy the Attack Bot. In the end, Colonel Truman reads the lost and found recommendation letter from Marcus, which pointed out Scott's abilities.
8	"Ranger Yellow"	Vanessa Alexander	Jackie Marchand	April 18, 2009
9	"Ranger Yellow"	Vanessa Alexander	Jackie Marchand	April 25, 2009
Tenaya 7 attacks Corinth with the Boombot while the Rangers and Doctor K answer questions from some school kids, making Summer remember her past as a spoiled rich kid. The Rangers fight and destroy the Boombot, only to discover it is a decoy and that Tenaya 7 has gone in search of a rare black diamond owned by Summer's parents. After defeating Tenaya 7, Summer tells the other Rangers that she promised to get married if her parents gave her space and temporarily become a Ranger until sometime when she would be taken home. Summer's parents then reveal that they are bankrupt and need her to marry Chaz Winchester for his family's money. Dillon and Scott are still arguing about whether or not Summer is making the right decision to go along with the marriage to get the diamond, and keep it safe from Tenaya 7. In a flashback, after Summer is abandoned in the desert on her birthday, her butler, Andrews, finds and helps her get close to Corinth before getting attacked by Grinders. Andrews dies but tells Summer to go on, and that he believes in her. Scott tells Mr. Landsdown about the "new" Summer and how she saved him after the Landsdowns first made it to Corinth. Tenaya 7 tries to steal the diamond at the wedding, but Summer catches on the Tenaya’s plan and, with Dr K’s help, Summer and the Rangers can foil Tenaya’s plan. Summer’s parents finally realised who their daughter has become, and told her that she doesn’t have to get married.
10	"Ranger Blue"	Charlie Haskell	Madellaine Paxson	May 2, 2009
A malfunction in his Time Manipulation Burst causes Flynn to be sidelined as the other Rangers face off against Tenaya 7 and her Grinders. While waiting for Doctor K to come up with a solution, Flynn looks back on his life leading up to Venjix's attack and how he came to be the Blue Ranger.
11	"Doctor K"	Charlie Haskell	Matthew Negrete	May 9, 2009
While attempting to overcome a power problem with the Rangers' new zord configuration, Doctor K is haunted by memories of her childhood being held at the "Alphabet Soup" think tank and a terrible mistake for which she has tried to make up.
12	"Blitz"	Charlie Haskell	Eddie Guzelian	May 16, 2009
Dillon has a dream about his past when the Rangers are called into action. Venjix sends multiple monsters, wearing the Rangers down, and Dillon must make an important decision when he confronts the monster with his stolen memories. He decides to keep his new memories and forget everything.
13	"Brother's Keeper"	Jonathan Brough	John Tellegen	May 23, 2009
Tenaya 7 implants a remote device on the back of Dillon's neck, which makes him fall under the control of Venjix and makes his bionic implants begin to take over his body. When he tries to leave the city, Dillon finds himself chained by Scott, leaving the rest of the Rangers to seek out the means to help him.
14	"Embodied"	Jonathan Brough	Eddie Guzelian	June 13, 2009
Dillon seeks to find more about his past by travelling to Omega City with the other Rangers in the GO-ONGER vehicle. They are sidetracked when Venjix downloads himself into a Generation 13 Attack Bot. When things look bad for the Rangers, two new and unknown Rangers appear to help. They then disappear, leaving the five Rangers in wonder at their identities.
15	"Ghosts"	Jonathan Brough	Eddie Guzelian	June 20, 2009
The Rangers arrive at Omega City only to discover it was all a trap set by Venjix. While trying to escape, they are ambushed and overwhelmed by Venjix forces, but are saved by Rangers Gold and Silver, who, this time, fight off their assailants in person. The seven Rangers then return to Corinth, where Rangers Gold and Silver finally reveal themselves as Gem and Gemma, long-lost friends of Dr K from the Alphabet Soup facility.
16	"In or Out"	Mike Smith	John Tellegen	July 4, 2009
Scott decides to join Gem and Gemma in a more offensive approach in the battle against Venjix. Colonel Truman defaults to his usual "defend the city" tactics and ends up trapping everyone inside while a Venjix bot sucks all the air out of the city. The remaining Rangers make a deadly escape from Corinth and regroup with Scott to save the city.
17	"Prisoners"	Mike Smith	Madellaine Paxson	July 11, 2009
Dillon hears Gem and Gemma humming a tune identical to the one from his pocket watch. They inform him that they learned it from a blind girl they befriended in a Venjix work camp and that the tune came from a pocket watch belonging to the girl's brother. Dillon, convinced that his sister is still there, mounts a rescue attempt with Summer and Ziggy while Scott and Flynn attempt to hold off a dangerous new attack bot. Dr K and the Rangers learn that Venjix is building a doomsday weapon and must venture back to the facility to destroy it.
18	"Belly of the Beast"	Mike Smith	Matthew Negrete	August 1, 2009
The Rangers must return to the factory where the doomsday device is being built. Dillon attempts to find his sister before it's too late. Dillon discovers that he, Summer, Gem, and Gemma are in his sister's cell. Summer sees the key that belonged to Dillon's sister at Venjix factory that matches Dillon's key.
19	"Three's a Crowd"	Peter Salmon	John Tellegen	August 8, 2009
Gem & Gemma's "blow things up and ask questions later" motto is getting quite out of hand. They follow a trail they think might lead to the Venjix Palace and end up walking right into a trap. They must learn to work together with the other Rangers as a team, and in turn, form a new Megazord configuration called the SkyRev Megazord.
20	"Heroes Among Us"	Peter Salmon	Judd Lynn	August 15, 2009
In an effort to impress his father, Scott makes a reckless trip out to the wasteland. He and Gem stumble upon human prisoners, and their field trip turns into a rescue mission. Venjix test-drives his new and improved robotic form. His new body doesn't hold up very well against the Rangers. Scott talks to Dillon about the Venjix Prisoners Camp, where humans are infected with the Venjix virus, and Grinders make human hybrids like Dillon, his sister & the other at the Venjix Palace.
21	"Not So Simple"	Peter Salmon	Matthew Negrete	August 22, 2009
For the first time, Gem and Gemma split up. Gemma believes in what Flynn can do. Together, they work on a Road Attack Zord on the side. With all their resources used up, Dr K has to trust the untested technology, and they use it to destroy the latest attack bot.
22	"The Dome Dolls"	Mike Smith	John Tellegen	September 5, 2009
A Chemical Attack Bot attacks the city and puts all men fast asleep. Now, the women of Corinth, led by Summer, all have to work together and save the day. DDrK works on an antidote to awaken the men of Corinth City.
23	"And….Action"	Mike Smith	Judd Lynn	September 12, 2009
For the first time, join Ziggy (aka: Milo Cawthorne) as he takes you behind the scenes and into the lives of the Power Rangers. See how explosions and stunts are done, as well as the funny moments that don't make it into the show, but keep the Power Rangers set a lively place to work as a Ranger. The Rangers and Dr K (Olivia Tennent) are sitting on the couch to watch their episode.
24	"Ancient History"	Mike Smith	John Tellegen	September 19, 2009
Untested technology is found in an Alphabet Soup dumping ground. Colonel Truman tries to keep the technology from Venjix and comes across a video log that pins Dr K responsible for the start of Venjix. Colonel Truman wants to arrest Dr K., but if he does, then she wouldn’t be able to help the Rangers with the dangerous Paleomax technology.
25	"Key to the Past"	Mike Smith	Jeffrey Newman	September 26, 2009
It dawns on Dillon that the two keys to his musical pocketwatch fit together to play another tune - the same one that Tenaya 7 whistles. Tenaya 7 is hit by memories of her past. She does some investigating on her own and finds out what happened to her. Dillon finds out Tenaya 7 is his long-lost sister.
26	"Beyond a Doubt"	Charlie Haskell	Judd Lynn	September 26, 2009
Tenaya 7 and Dillon go to Venjix Palace to retrieve codes to stop an Attack Bot. Dillon is left wondering which side she is on when she turns him in to Venjix. With the stolen codes, Dr K can configure the RPM Ultrazord. Kilobyte captures Tenaya 7 before she can reunite with the Rangers.
27	"Control-Alt-Delete"	Charlie Haskell	David Garber	October 3, 2009
Dillon's search for Tenaya is put on hold when Scott is in trouble. Scott was shot with a key that allows Shifter to control him. The Rangers do their best to save their leader when they come face to face with Tenaya 15. She has been reprogrammed with one mission: Serve Venjix. Dr K makes a gun whose shots can make Tenaya susceptible to mind control.
28	"Run Ziggy Run"	Charlie Haskell	John Tellegen	October 3, 2009
It's time for Ziggy to pay back the $5 million he owes Fresno Bob. Tenaya 15 makes a deal with Fresno Bob to give him Ziggy in exchange for a certain case. Instead, she double-crosses Fresno Bob, and Ziggy ends up saving him. The Rangers deploy DDrK's Rail SaSabreeapon against the latest Attack Bot. Fresno Bob and Ziggy are now even.
29	"If Venjix Won"	Charlie Haskell	Tiffany Louie	December 19, 2009
Ziggy and Doctor K are accidentally teleported into a distant cave outside of Corinth. The remaining Rangers need to find out the password to Dr K's computer and retrieve it. Still, their efforts instead trigger a time capsule recording compiled by Dr K to be played only if Venjix attained absolute victory.
30	"End Game"	Mike Smith	John Tellegen	December 19, 2009
Venjix’s endgame is about to reveal itself. Every Attack Bot has been a calculating step closer to his plan. Dillon fears that the virus will take him over. The city is filled with hybrids, just like Dillon. Venjix is going to activate them all, and Corinth will be brought down.
31	"Danger and Destiny"	Mike Smith	Judd Lynn	December 26, 2009
32	"Danger and Destiny"	Mike Smith	Judd Lynn	December 26, 2009
Part 1: When a magnetic wave cuts off Corinth's electricity, the Rangers are left vulnerable to attack from Venjix's army of sleeper hybrids. Ziggy embarks on a solo mission to rescue Dr K, kidnapped by Venjix when The Garage is compromised; Venjix deletes two Rangers, Gem and Gemma; and Venjix's hardware inside Dillon's body begins to take control over him. Tenaya has returned to the good side thanks to DDrK's antidote, and Kilobyte is destroyed. At Dr Dr's destroyed lab, the Rangers appeal to her to help them. Tenaya refuses at first, but Flynn convinces her to do so since Dillon's life is in danger. Part 2: Dr. K is ordered to develop another virus to counter Venjix, which has to be inserted into Venjix himself to be activated. Tenaya agrees to insert the virus into the Venjix network. Despite being short a few members, the remaining Rangers vow to soldier on before Venjix can regroup his armies. Gem and Gemma return with help from Dr K. Venjix is destroyed when Gem and Gemma destroy the support beams to the Command Centre and drop Venjix. The Earth is now safe for humanity to live and prosper once more. In the last scene, a red light appears in Ranger Red's morpher, hinting at Venjix's survival. Note: This was the last episode produced while Disney owned the rights to the Power Rangers franchise. Saban would buy back the franchise from Disney in 2010.

== Production ==
Australian actor Eka Darville, who previously starred in series three of Blue Water High, was reported to have a role in September 2008 in what was then unknown as RPM or Racing Performance Machines which began production in September 2008 in New Zealand. Heidi Kathy Bradhurt had been cast as an extra, but her profile initially listed her as the Yellow Ranger, named "Kayla," whose name and actress had since been changed to "Summer" played by Rose McIver. Daniel Ewing had been reported in November 2008 to be playing a major character named "Dillon," revealed to be the Black Ranger. Other cast members include Murray Keane in the role of "Benny", Charlie McDermott voicing "General Crunch", and Jason Hoyte as a guest role named "Mr. McAllistair".

Executive producer Eddie Guzelian was dismissed midseason due to creative differences and replaced with former series writer and producer Judd Lynn. Lynn did not immediately return when the franchise was reacquired by Saban but returned as showrunner with Power Rangers Dino Charge in 2015.

An article of The New Zealand Herald reported that Power Rangers RPM was to be the final season of the Power Rangers series. Production manager Sally Campbell stated in an interview "...at this stage we will not be shooting another season". A September 1, 2009, revision to Disney A to Z: The Official Encyclopedia by Disney's then-head archivist Dave Smith stated that production of new episodes of Power Rangers ceased in 2009. A re-version of Mighty Morphin Power Rangers began broadcasting in early 2010 instead. However, in mid-2010, Haim Saban bought the Power Rangers franchise back from Disney and production was restarted during that year for a 2011 series.

Jungle Fury (which was said to have low ratings) was originally set to be the final season, but obligations with Bandai forced Disney to produce one more season.

== Reception ==
Flixist ranked it second-best out of twenty seasons, remarking "showrunners decided to go for broke and throw everything they had into creating a post-apocalyptic film for kids. Lifting creative elements from films like Mad Max and Terminator, then adding a Power Rangers layer helped give this season a vibe no other season had before. It was more creatively cemented than years past, and actually had good cinematography". Geeky Brummie ranked it third, saying "Dillon and Ziggy are two of the best rangers and work fantastically together. The season also has some of the most surprising revelations in the franchise’s history". Comic Art Community ranked it fourth, saying "The childlike elements of the base material were generally ignored for a very dark, adult season of the show that involved the attempted genocide of mankind which included various character deaths in the show". Eric Francisco, writing for Inverse, called it the darkest, the best, and "smart, clever, and so hysterically funny that it should stand shoulder-to-shoulder with the best cult science-fiction series", and echoed the connections to Mad Max and Terminator.

== Comics ==
In 2018, the RPM Rangers appeared in Boom! Studios's "Shattered Grid", a crossover event between teams from all eras commemorating the 25th anniversary of the original television series. It was published in Mighty Morphin Power Rangers #25-30 and various tie-ins. A Power Rangers RPM story by Anthony Burch and Dylan Burnett was published in Mighty Morphin Power Rangers 2018 Annual as part of the crossover.
