= 1995 in American television =

In American television in 1995, notable events included television show debuts, finales, cancellations, and channel initiations, closures and rebrandings, as well as information about controversies and disputes.

== Notable events ==
=== January ===
Date	Event
2	The 1994–96 United States broadcast televiqion realignment continues in two major markets: as a by-product of an affiliation deal between ABC and The E.W. Scripps Company, and a related deal between CBS and Westinghouse Broadcasting, Westinghouse-owned WBZ-TV (channel 4) in Boston, Massachusetts switches from NBC to CBS, while NBC aligns with former CBS affiliate WHDH (which will remain affiliated with the network until New Year's Eve 2016). In Baltimore, CBS switches affiliations to Westinghouse-owned WJZ-TV (channel 13) after 46 years as an ABC affiliate, while ABC joins Scripps-owned WMAR (channel 2) and NBC reunites with WBAL-TV (channel 11) after 13 years as a CBS affiliate. Later that year, Westinghouse acquires CBS, making both WBZ-TV and WJZ-TV CBS owned-and-operated stations.
2	G-Force: Guardians of Space, the second American adaptation of the Japanese anime series Science Ninja Team Gatchaman (the first being Battle of the Planets) becomes the first-ever anime to air on Cartoon Network. On January 29, Robot Carnival, Vampire Hunter D, and Twilight of the Cockroaches also debut, followed in February of next year by Speed Racer. This predates the March 1997 debut of Toonami, which will go on to popularize anime on the network and in the West.
5	All My Children celebrates its 25th anniversary and broadcasts a prime-time special on ABC.
5	In an interview with Kathleen Gingrich, mother of Republican politician Newt Gingrich, on CBS' Eye to Eye, Mrs. Gingrich said she could not say what her son thought about First Lady Hillary Clinton on the air. Connie Chung asked Mrs. Gingrich to "just whisper it to me, just between you and me," and Mrs. Gingrich's microphone volume was turned up as she replied "He thinks she's a bitch." Many people interpreted Chung's suggestion that if Mrs. Gingrich would whisper this statement it would be promised that the statement would be off the record. Bill Carter for The New York Times reported, "Ms. Chung had become the object of some of the most ferocious criticism, justified or not, ever directed at any network anchor as a result of her now infamous interview with Speaker Newt Gingrich's mother, Kathleen." The interview was also parodied on Saturday Night Live.
11	The WB, a joint venture between Warner Bros. Television and Tribune Broadcasting in conjunction with original network CEO Jamie Kellner, launches. Among the programs offered are four situation comedies (two family-oriented, one family-focused but adult-targeted and one adult-oriented soap opera-inspired satire): The Wayans Bros. (starring former In Living Color DJ/cast member Shawn Wayans and his younger brother, Marlon Wayans), The Parent 'Hood (starring Robert Townsend), Unhappily Ever After and Muscle. While the former three series wound up lasting five seasons, Muscle fails to survive its first season. In addition to being available on around 70 affiliates, The WB is also initially distributed directly to cable and satellite providers via the superstation feed of Chicago charter affiliate WGN-TV (owned by Tribune) to serve markets where the lack of available independent stations or stations that passed over the network in favor of fellow fledgling network UPN prevented The WB from maintaining an exclusive affiliation at launch. (This ended in August 1999, as a result of The WB gaining full-time affiliates in some underserved mid-sized markets and a small-market cable feed being launched to serve smaller markets.)
16	The United Paramount Network (UPN) launches, with a two-hour premiere of Star Trek: Voyager. This results in an affiliation change in San Antonio between Fox affiliate KRRT (now KMYS) and independent station KABB, as KRRT leaves Fox for the new network (due to its then-ownership by Paramount Pictures, UPN's part-owner) and KABB assumes the Fox affiliation.
16	The 1994–96 United States broadcast television realignment continues in the Flint/Tri-Cities, Michigan market, as NBC affiliate WNEM-TV in Bay City and CBS affiliate WEYI-TV in Saginaw swap affiliations. The move is deemed necessary by CBS to restore coverage in areas underserved by its then-new affiliate WGPR in adjacent Detroit, since WNEM-TV's signal is stronger than that of WEYI-TV.
24	Live broadcasts of the O. J. Simpson trial begin; as a result, many network daytime programming are partially pre-empted, more or less, for nine months.

=== February ===
Date	Event
2	Seinfeld broadcasts its 100th episode on NBC.
20	What a Cartoon! (also known as World Premiere Toons) launches on TBS, TNT and Cartoon Network simultaneously as part of the Space Ghost Coast to Coast special "1st Annual World Premiere Toon-In". The first short, "The Powerpuff Girls in Meat Fuzzy Lumpkins", was shown at the end of the special. The series will prove to launch the careers of many prominent animators such as Butch Hartman, Craig McCracken, Genndy Tartakovsky, and Seth MacFarlane.
21	Ted Danson reprises his role as Sam Malone from Cheers in an episode of its spin–off Frasier on NBC.
25	In what would be his final television appearance, George Burns is presented with the very first SAG Lifetime Achievement Award by the Screen Actors Guild.

=== March ===
Date	Event
6	Deborah Norville begins assuming her duties as host of Inside Edition.
6	The Jenny Jones Show taped an episode titled "Revealing Same Sex Secret Crush", in which the secret admirers of six guests were revealed. Three days after the episode was taped, one of the guests, Jonathan Schmitz, murdered his secret admirer, Scott Amedure.
13	The 1994–96 United States broadcast television realignment continues in Seattle-Tacoma, as Gaylord Broadcasting-owned KSTW joins CBS for the third time while former CBS affiliate KIRO-TV joins the UPN network.
31	All major U.S. networks interrupt their regular programming to break the news regarding the murder of Tejano music superstar Selena Quintanilla-Pérez. The lead item on national television network evening news programs in Corpus Christi, Texas had been the end of the 1994–95 Major League Baseball strike. Within thirty minutes of its announcement, Selena's murder became the lead item on all television stations in South Texas. Univision and Telemundo are among the first national news stations to arrive at the crime scene. Coverage of the singer's death and the murder trial would dominate American newscasts in 1995.

=== April ===
Date	Event
2	Fox airs National Hockey League games for the first time.
12	Drew Barrymore appears on CBS's Late Show with David Letterman. In honor of Letterman's birthday, guest Barrymore dances on his desk and flashes him "on-air".
18	Rox becomes the first television series distributed via internet.
28–29	WCW and New Japan Pro-Wrestling showcase the "Collision in Korea". It is the first ever American pro wrestling event held in North Korea. It is rebroadcast in both Japan and the United States with the main event being between Ric Flair and Antonio Inoki.

=== May ===
Date	Event
7	Jurassic Park makes its network broadcast television premiere on NBC.
9	CBS broadcasts Deadline for Murder: From the Files of Edna Buchanan, starring Elizabeth Montgomery. This turned out to be Montgomery's final live-action acting role (her final acting role in general was in a voice-over role on Batman: The Animated Series) as she would die on May 18.
12	As the World Turns broadcasts its milestone 10,000th episode on CBS.
21	Above Suspicion starring Christopher Reeve premieres on HBO. In it, Reeve plays a paralyzed cop who plots to murder his wife. Six days after Above Suspicion first airs, Reeve is seriously injured in a fall while riding on horseback, resulting in him becoming a quadriplegic for the remainder of his life.
24	ABC announces that an episode of the soap opera All My Children was deleted from broadcasting due to the then-recent Oklahoma City bombing; in the story, villainess Janet Green was supposed to explode the church in which her ex Trevor Dillon was to marry her rival Laurel Banning.

=== June ===
Date	Event
24	Fox broadcasts the fourth game of the Stanley Cup Final between the New Jersey Devils and Detroit Red Wings. This marks the first time that a clinching game from the Stanley Cup Final is broadcast on American network television since the sixth game of the 1980 Final on CBS.

=== July ===
Date	Event
1	After being purchased by New World Communications from Argyle Television, three additional stations switch to Fox as part of the 1994–96 United States broadcast television realignment: KDFW (channel 4) in Dallas-Ft. Worth, KTBC (channel 7) in Austin, Texas and KTVI (channel 2) in St. Louis. KDFW and KTBC both defect from CBS, while KTVI leaves ABC. Independent station KTVT (channel 11) in Dallas takes the CBS affiliation in that area through an affiliation deal between the network and Gaylord Broadcasting (owners of KTVT); in Austin, former Fox affiliate KBVO (channel 42) swaps affiliations with KTBC and changes its calls to KEYE; and in St. Louis, KDNL (channel 30) swaps its Fox affiliation with KTVI and joins ABC. Former Fox-owned station KDAF-TV (channel 33) joins The WB, taking that affiliation from KXTX-TV (channel 39) due to a temporary arrangement in which KXTX would carry WB programming, until such time Fox was cleared to move to channel 4. KXTX-TV then becomes an independent station. Fox Kids, Fox's children programming block, doesn't follow the rest of the network's programming to KTBC and KTVI because of their commitments to news, and instead air on independent stations K13VC and KNLC. As a result of a dispute between Fox and KNLC, however, Fox Kids is moved to KTVI the following year.
11	ABC airs the 66th annual Major League Baseball All-Star Game from Arlington, Texas. It was ABC's first broadcast of baseball's All-Star Game since 1988 and their last to date.
24	WFMZ-TV initiates their very first daytime Berks Edition at 5:30 pm and the First Nighttime Newscast at 10:30 pm, covering the entire Berks County and all across the Lehigh Valley of Eastern Pennsylvania and Western New Jersey.
31	The Walt Disney Company announces that it would acquire and merge with Capital Cities/ABC Inc. The purchase would include the ABC network itself, stakes in A&E Television Networks, Lifetime and ESPN Inc., and the ownership in the limited partnership-ran animation studio DIC Productions, L.P. The sale would be completed in 1996.

=== August ===
Date	Event
4	Shortly after CBS' affiliation agreement with Westinghouse Broadcasting, its flagship station at that time, KDKA-TV finally brings back the program CBS This Morning after a few years of preempting.
7	NBC wins the rights to broadcast the 2002 Winter Olympics from Salt Lake City, Utah for $545 million.
14	ABC affiliate in Rockford, WREX-TV and NBC affiliate WTVO swaps network affiliations due to a group deal with Quincy Newspapers.
17	On the series finale of Yo! MTV Raps, numerous high-profile names in the world of hip-hop close the show out with a freestyle rap session.
17	The Tribune Company acquired a 12.5% limited partnership interest in The WB for $12 million; the deal gave Tribune an option to increase its stake in the network up to a 25% interest; Tribune would eventually increase its ownership share in the WB to 22.5% on March 31, 1997.
21	As a result of the 1994–96 United States broadcast television realignment, longtime NBC affiliate WLUK-TV in Green Bay becomes the first of four "Big three" affiliates that SF Broadcasting (a joint venture of Savoy Communications and Fox Broadcasting) has purchased from Burnham Broadcasting to switch its affiliation to Fox. NBC eventually aligns with former Fox affiliate WGBA-TV. Two more NBC-affiliated stations (WALA-TV in Mobile, Alabama, and KHON-TV in Honolulu), along with ABC affiliate WVUE in New Orleans switch their affiliations to Fox on January 1, 1996. NBC again swaps affiliations with the former Fox affiliates in Mobile and Honolulu (WPMI and KHNL respectively), while ABC joins WB affiliate WGNO and former Fox affiliate WNOL joins The WB.
22	Larry Hagman, former main actor of Dallas and I Dream of Jeannie, undergoes a liver transplant.

=== September ===
Date	Event
4	The very first edition of WCW Monday Nitro airs from the Mall of America in Minneapolis, Minnesota on TNT.
5	Alan Kalter becomes the second announcer of the Late Show with David Letterman replacing Bill Wendell.
6	In front of a nationwide audience watching on ESPN and on HTS in the Baltimore market, Orioles shortstop Cal Ripken Jr. surpasses New York Yankees legend Lou Gehrig on Major League Baseball's list for most consecutive games played.
8	The 1994–96 United States broadcast television realignment continues when longtime ABC affiliate WGHP-TV (channel 8) in High Point, North Carolina is sold directly to Fox (acquired via New World Communications from Citicasters, along with WBRC-TV in Birmingham, Alabama due to ownership conflicts) and as a result, becomes a Fox-owned station. Former Fox affiliates WNRW-TV (channel 45)/WGGT-TV (channel 48, now MyNetworkTV affiliate WMYV-TV) assume the ABC affiliation, and WNRW-TV changes its callsign to WXLV-TV to reflect the new affiliation. Both stations retain a secondary UPN affiliation until WGGT-TV leaves its WXLV-TV simulcast to become a full-time UPN affiliate the next year.
8	With the cancellation of the 1988 incarnation of Family Feud, The Price Is Right becomes the last remaining Goodson-Todman show on the air until a revival of Match Game three years later.
9	Kids' WB debuts on The WB, anchored by Animaniacs, which transfers over from Fox's children's programming block, Fox Kids. It debuted on Fox Kids 2 years before.
10	A major compensation deal between NBC and CBS after the Westinghouse-Group W/CBS deal as a result of the 1994–96 United States broadcast television realignment becomes effective: two NBC O&O's (KCNC-TV in Denver and KUTV-TV in Salt Lake City) and the network's Philadelphia affiliate KYW-TV become CBS-affiliated stations (and quickly after that CBS-owned stations after Westinghouse merged with CBS), while former CBS affiliate KSL-TV in Salt Lake City joins NBC and CBS O&O WCAU in Philadelphia becomes an NBC-owned station. Meanwhile, in Miami, CBS-owned WCIX (channel 6) and NBC-owned WTVJ (channel 4) swap channel positions, with WCIX becoming WFOR-TV as a result of the change. Two related swaps also occur in Denver, as former ABC affiliate KUSA-TV joins NBC, and former CBS affiliate KMGH-TV switches to ABC as a result of an affiliation deal between the network and McGraw-Hill, KMGH's owners.
10	The 47th Primetime Emmy Awards are aired on Fox.
10	CBS acquires ABC affiliate WPRI-TV from Narragansett Television and swaps affiliations with WLNE-TV, thus reversing a swap that took place in 1977.
10	UPN Kids launches on UPN, featuring two new series, Space Strikers and Teknoman.
10	As part of a deal between Outlet Communications and NBC, WB affiliate WNCN-TV in Raleigh, North Carolina switches to NBC, ending WNCN's 9-month affiliation with The WB. Former NBC affiliate WRDC elevates its UPN affiliation to full-time status, while WRAZ, which had signed on three days earlier, joins the WB.
17	Part 2 of "Who Shot Mr. Burns?" serves as the Season 7 premiere of The Simpsons on Fox. An America's Most Wanted special, "Springfield's Most Wanted", precedes the episode.
22	KASW signs on the air in Phoenix, Arizona, as part of a LMA with, and taking The WB from, KTVK which becomes independent. In addition, KASW also assumes the local broadcast rights to Fox Kids, which Fox affiliate KSAZ-TV is pre-empting in favor of news.
27	Jennifer Love Hewitt joins the cast of Party of Five, after appearing in three failed shows as a cast member, the Fox series Shaky Ground and the ABC series The Byrds of Paradise and McKenna.
30	Will Ferrell, Cheri Oteri, and Darrell Hammond join the cast of NBC's Saturday Night Live.

=== October ===
Date	Event
2	In Major League Baseball's first "do or die" tie-breaker game since 1980, the Seattle Mariners defeat the California Angels 9–1 to clinch the American League West title and their first ever postseason berth. The game is nationally televised on ESPN with Jon Miller and Joe Morgan on the call.
3	More than 150 million people tune in to watch the verdict in the O.J. Simpson murder trial, which ends with Simpson being found not guilty of murdering his ex-wife Nicole Brown Simpson and her friend Ronald Goldman. The verdict is met with both praise and criticism.
8	Game five of the American League Division Series between the Seattle Mariners and New York Yankees is broadcast on ABC/The Baseball Network with Brent Musburger and Jim Kaat on the call. With Seattle down by the score of 5–4 going into the bottom of the 11th inning, Edgar Martínez lines a double to the left field fence off of New York reliever Jack McDowell, scoring both Joey Cora and Ken Griffey Jr. to send the Mariners to the League Championship Series for the first time. Martinez's game-winning hit and the aftermath remains the Mariners' most famous moment. During 1995, there were rumors that the Mariners might relocate to the Tampa area. Their success this season leads to renewed local interest in the team and the building of Safeco Field, which opened in July 1999.
15	ABC affiliate W58BT goes on the air and former ABC affiliate WSJV-TV switches to Fox.
18	In the Michiana region of Indiana, Elkhart-based ABC affiliate WSJV swaps affiliations with South Bend-based Fox affiliate W58BT (which will become WBND-LP by the end of the year). The rush for W58BT to switch to ABC (at the insistence of network executives, who didn't want to wait for W58BT to sign-on a new transmitter) causes a partial transmitter failure, which is fixed within a few days.
20	Robert MacNeil anchors The MacNeil/Lehrer Newshour on PBS for the last time.
21	ABC and NBC begin their unprecedented shared coverage of the World Series through their soon to be concluding revenue sharing joint-venture with Major League Baseball called The Baseball Network. ABC, who last broadcast a World Series in 1989 airs Games 1, 4, and 5 (with Al Michaels, Jim Palmer and Tim McCarver on the call) while NBC, who last broadcast a World Series in 1988, airs games two, three and the decisive game six (with Bob Costas, Joe Morgan and Bob Uecker on the call). (A seventh game, if necessary, would have been televised by ABC.) While NBC will continue to hold some MLB rights for the next few years, game five on October 26 would prove to be the last Major League Baseball game to be broadcast by ABC until game one of the 2020 American League Wild Card Series between the Houston Astros and Minnesota Twins.
28	In Toledo, Ohio, NBC affiliate WTVG swaps affiliations with ABC affiliate WNWO and becomes an ABC owned-and-operated station.
28	The Atlanta Braves win the 1995 World Series in six games over the Cleveland Indians, making them the first Major League team to win a championship for three different cities (first being Boston in 1914 and then Milwaukee in 1957). It is also the final broadcast for The Baseball Network, which as previously mentioned, was a joint-venture between Major League Baseball, ABC, and NBC.

=== November ===
Date	Event
1	Clear Channel Communications, owners of recently purchased WHP-TV in Harrisburg, entered into a local marketing agreement with Gateway Communications, owners of WLYH-TV in Lancaster to start operating the station. As a result, WLYH-TV's news operation has been discontinued.
2	Characters from various NBC comedies appear on different shows. The lead character from Caroline in the City appears on Friends, while Friends characters Ross appears on The Single Guy and Chandler appears on Caroline in the City.
7	Major League Baseball reaches a television deal with Fox and NBC, allowing the former to obtain MLB game rights. Fox paid $575 million for the five-year contract, a fraction less of the amount of money that CBS had paid for the Major League Baseball television rights for the 1990–1993 seasons.
13	ABC's 30-minute soap opera Loving is turned into The City.
20	On ABC, One Life to Live broadcasts its 7,000th episode and debuts a new opening sequence.
20	ROX and Computer Chronicles are broadcast via the Internet—these are the first Internet broadcasts in the history of television.

=== December ===
Date	Event
1	The 1994–96 United States broadcast television realignment continues as WHBQ-TV (channel 13) in Memphis, Tennessee ends its ABC affiliation after 45 years. WHBQ-TV is acquired by Fox Television Stations from Communications Corporation of America and joins Fox, while former Fox affiliate WPTY-TV (channel 24) joins ABC.
11	On NBC, The Today Show becomes the highest-rated morning news program (and would remain so until 2012).
16	WLYH-TV in Lancaster ends its affiliation with CBS following a local marketing agreement with WHP-TV, and as a result, WLYH-TV became a primary UPN affiliate, cutting back the programming hours within the programming schedule.
18	As part of the Monday Night War, World Championship Wrestling booker Eric Bischoff has WWF performer Alundra Blayze (now going by the name Madusa) appear on TNT's WCW Monday Nitro, where she throws her WWF Women's Championship into a trash can.
31	Cartoon Network broadcasts the World Premiere Toons Countdown Call-In Show, a three-hour marathon during New Year's Eve where viewers decide to vote and call for their favorite What a Cartoon! short. The Dexter's Laboratory pilot (later known as "Changes"), was chosen the winner of the special as the network could later greenlit as a full animated series premiering in 1996.

== Programs ==
=== Programs debuting in 1995 ===
Date	Show	Network
January 1	Taxicab Confessions	HBO
January 2	Cybill	CBS
January 2	The Shnookums and Meat Funny Cartoon Show	Syndication
January 4	Washington Journal	C-SPAN
January 4	Double Rush	CBS
January 4	Women of the House	CBS
January 8	House of Buggin'	Fox
January 9	A Whole New Ballgame	ABC
January 9	The Late Late Show with Tom Snyder	CBS
January 11	Muscle	The WB
January 11	Unhappily Ever After	The WB
January 11	The Wayans Bros.	The WB
January 14	Fudge	ABC
January 15	Get Smart	Fox
January 15	Modern Marvels	The History Channel
January 16	Hercules: The Legendary Journeys	Syndication
January 16	Vanishing Son	Syndication
January 16	The Puzzle Place	PBS Kids
January 16	Star Trek: Voyager	UPN
January 17	Marker	UPN
January 17	The Watcher	UPN
January 17	Golf Central	Golf Channel
January 18	The Parent 'Hood	The WB
January 23	Pig Sty	UPN
January 23	Platypus Man	UPN
January 26	Pointman	PTEN
January 29	Extreme	ABC
January 31	The Marshal	ABC
February 20	What a Cartoon!	Cartoon Network
March 4	NHL 2Night	ESPN2
March 5	The Great Defender	Fox
March 8	The George Wendt Show	CBS
March 10	VR.5	Fox
March 11	The Office	CBS
March 13	Medicine Ball	Fox
March 14	Under One Roof	CBS
March 21	NewsRadio	NBC
March 21	Pride & Joy	NBC
March 22	Sliders	Fox
March 26	Happily Ever After: Fairy Tales for Every Child	HBO
March 26	The Outer Limits	Showtime
March 31	The Wright Verdicts	CBS
April 1	Amazing Grace	NBC
April 2	Real Sports with Bryant Gumbel	HBO
April 8	The Maxx	MTV
April 10	In the House	NBC
April 14	Colby's Clubhouse	TBN
April 18	Legend	UPN
May 27	Bringing up Jack	ABC
May 28	Dr. Katz, Professional Therapist	Comedy Central
May 28	My Wildest Dreams	Fox
June 5	Singled Out	MTV
July 12	20th Century with Mike Wallace	The History Channel
July 19	Road Rules	MTV
August 7	Squawk Box	CNBC
August 8	Aeon Flux	MTV
August 20	Exit 57	Comedy Central
August 23	Kirk	The WB
August 28	Nowhere Man	UPN
August 29	Live Shot	UPN
August 31	The Crew	Fox
September 2	Wild About Animals	Syndication
September 4	Bananas in Pyjamas	Syndication
September 4	WCW Monday Nitro	TNT
September 4	Xena: Warrior Princess	Syndication
September 5	Deadly Games	UPN
September 6	Carnie!	Syndication
September 8	Timon & Pumbaa	Syndication and CBS
September 9	Gadget Boy & Heather	Syndcation
September 9	Earthworm Jim	Kids' WB
September 9	Freakazoid!	Kids' WB
September 9	Pinky and the Brain	Kids' WB
September 9	The Sylvester & Tweety Mysteries	Kids' WB
September 9	The Preston Episodes	Fox
September 9	Hang Time	NBC
September 10	Cleghorne!	The WB
September 10	First Time Out	The WB
September 10	Simon	The WB
September 10	Space Strikers	UPN Kids
September 11	Danny!	Syndication
September 11	Day & Date	Syndication
September 11	Gabrielle	Syndication
September 11	LAPD: Life on the Beat	Syndication
September 11	Lauren Hutton and...	Syndication
September 11	The Mark Walberg Show	Syndication
September 11	Monster Mania	Syndication
September 11	Tempestt	Syndication
September 11	Ned & Stacey	Fox
September 11	Partners	Fox
September 11	Bless This House	CBS
September 12	The Monroes	ABC
September 13	Central Park West	CBS
September 13	Courthouse	CBS
September 13	The Drew Carey Show	ABC
September 13	The Naked Truth	ABC
September 14	Charlie Grace	ABC
September 15	Maybe This Time	ABC
September 15	Strange Luck	Fox
September 15	The Stephanie Miller Show	Syndication
September 16	Santo Bugito	CBS
September 16	The Twisted Tales of Felix the Cat	CBS
September 16	Masked Rider	Fox Kids
September 16	Brotherly Love	NBC
September 16	Minor Adjustments	NBC
September 16	Night Stand with Dick Dietrick	Syndication
September 16	U.S. Customs: Classified	Syndication
September 17	Almost Perfect	CBS
September 17	The Client	CBS
September 18	Can't Hurry Love	CBS
September 18	George & Alana	Syndication
September 19	Hudson Street	ABC
September 19	Murder One	ABC
September 19	The Pursuit of Happiness	NBC
September 21	Caroline in the City	NBC
September 21	The Single Guy	NBC
September 22	American Gothic	CBS
September 22	Dweebs	CBS
September 22	Bonnie	CBS
September 23	8-Track Flashback	VH1
September 23	JAG	NBC
September 24	Space: Above and Beyond	Fox
September 28	New York News	CBS
October 1	Misery Loves Company	Fox
October 1	Too Something	Fox
October 1	Inspiration, Please!	Faith & Values Channel
October 2	Flipper	Syndication
October 2	Family Challenge	The Family Channel
October 2	Wild Animal Games	The Family Channel
October 8	Wishbone	PBS
October 14	Mad TV	Fox
October 16	Littlest Pet Shop	Syndication
October 21	Street Fighter: The Animated Series	USA Network
October 22	The Little Lulu Show	HBO
October 27	Goosebumps	Fox Kids
October 28	Dumb and Dumber	ABC
October 30	High Society	CBS
November 3	Mr. Show with Bob and David	HBO
November 4	The Adventures of Hyperman	CBS
November 6	Little Bear	Nick Jr.
November 13	The City	ABC
December 3	What's So Funny?	Fox
December 9	Ace Ventura: Pet Detective	CBS

=== Programs returning in 1995 ===
Show	Last aired	Previous network	New title	Returning
Square One TV	1992	PBS	Square One TV Math Talk	Unknown

=== Programs ending in 1995 ===
Date	Show	Debut
January 1	Liquid Television	1991
January 6	SWAT Kats: The Radical Squadron	1993
January 21	Wild C.A.T.s	1994
January 26	My So-Called Life	1994
January 27	The New Price Is Right	1994
January 28	The Boys Are Back	1994
February 1	Hearts Afire	1992
February 2	My Brother and Me	1994
February 13	2 Stupid Dogs	1993
February 13	Ghostwriter	1992
February 19	Get Smart	1995
February 25	Free Willy	1994
February 28	Me and the Boys	1994
March 3	M.A.N.T.I.S.	1994
March 6	Models Inc.	1994
March 12	The Brothers Grunt	1994
March 13	A Whole New Ballgame	1995
March 15	All-American Girl	1994
March 25	The 5 Mrs. Buchanans	1994
March 27	The Shnookums and Meat Funny Cartoon Show	1995
April 4	On Our Own	1994
April 6	Extreme	1995
April 12	The Pink Panther	1993
April 12	The Cosby Mysteries	1994
April 12	Double Rush	1995
April 12	The George Wendt Show	1995
April 23	House of Buggin'	1995
May 7	Matlock	1986
May 11	Muscle	1995
May 12	VR.5	1995
May 15	Pig Sty	1995
May 16	Marker	1995
May 16	In the Heat of the Night	1988
May 20	Star Search	1983
May 21	Sirens	1993
May 22	Blossom	1991
May 22	Taz-Mania	1991
May 22	The Critic	1994
May 23	Full House (returned in 2016)	1987
May 28	Tiny Toon Adventures	1990
June 7	The Watcher	1995
June 10	The Mommies	1993
June 11	McGee and Me!	1989
June 14	Earth 2	1994
June 16	Supermarket Sweep (returned in 2000)	1965
June 17	Empty Nest	1988
June 17	Madman of the People	1994
June 19	The Maxx	1995
June 23	The Jon Stewart Show	1993
June 24	Bringing up Jack	1995
June 30	Love Connection	1983
July 1	The State	1993
July 4	Thunder Alley	1994
July 10	Platypus Man	1995
July 26	Northern Exposure	1990
July 31	The Great Defender	1995
August 15	Marker	1995
August 17	Yo! MTV Raps (returned in 2022)	1988
August 18	Love & War	1992
August 27	WWF Wrestling Challenge	1986
September 2	Name Your Adventure	1992
September 8	Family Feud (returned in 1999)	1976
September 8	Women of the House	1995
September 15	Batman: The Animated Series	1992
October 13	Quicksilver	1994
October 19	Charlie Grace	1995
October 19	The Monroes	1995
October 28	The Preston Episodes	1995
November 9	Dweebs	1995
November 9	The Moxy Show	1993
November 10	Loving	1983
November 15	Courthouse	1995
November 24	Legends of the Hidden Temple (returned in 2021)	1993
November 25	Aladdin	1994
November 27	Mighty Morphin Power Rangers	1993
December 3	Space Strikers	1995
December 8	Tattooed Teenage Alien Fighters from Beverly Hills	1994
December 9	The Baby Huey Show	1994
December 9	Bump in the Night	1994
December 16	Fudge	1995
December 17	Cleghorne!	1995
December 17	First Time Out	1995
December 22	Where in the World Is Carmen Sandiego?	1991
December 25	The Marshal	1995
Unknown date	Return to the Sea	1991

=== Entering syndication in 1995 ===
Show	Seasons	In Production	Source
America's Funniest Home Videos	6	Yes	
America's Most Wanted	7	Yes	
Beyond Reality	2	No	
Blossom	5	No	
Dinosaurs	4	No	
The Hitchhiker	6	No	
Home Improvement	4	Yes	
Melrose Place	4	Yes	
Seinfeld	6	Yes	
Step by Step	4	Yes	
Tales from the Crypt	6	Yes	

=== Programs changing networks in 1995 ===
Show	Moved from	Moved to
Animaniacs	Fox Kids	Kids' WB
The Busy World of Richard Scarry	Showtime	Nick Jr. Channel
G-Force: Guardians of Space	TBS	Cartoon Network
Madeline	The Family Channel	ABC
TV Nation	NBC	Fox
The Critic	ABC	Fox
Sister, Sister	ABC	The WB
One West Waikiki	CBS	First-run syndication

=== Milestone episodes and anniversaries ===
Show	Network	Episode #	Episode title	Episode airdate	Source
Home Improvement	ABC	100th episode	"Wilson's Girlfriend"	May 23	

=== Made-for-TV movies and miniseries ===
Premiere date	Title	Channel
January 7	Fudge-a-Mania	ABC
April 3	Danielle Steel's Vanished	NBC
May 14	The Langoliers	ABC
September 17	Danielle Steel's Zoya	NBC
October 29	Degree of Guilt	NBC

== Networks and services ==
=== Launches ===
Network	Type	Launch date	Notes	Source
America One	Cable and satellite	Unknown		
Free Speech TV	Cable television	Unknown		
HTV	Cable	January 1		
The History Channel	Cable and satellite	January 1		
The WB	Cable and satellite	January 11		
UPN	Cable and satellite	January 16		
The Golf Channel	Cable and satellite	January 17		
Classic Sports Network	Cable and satellite	May 6		
Outdoor Life Network	Cable and satellite	July 31		
CNNfn	Cable and satellite	December 29		
Speedvision	Cable and satellite	December 31		
Great American Country	Cable television	December 31		

=== Conversions and rebrandings ===
Old network name	New network name	Type	Conversion Date	Notes	Source
La Cadena Deportiva Prime Ticket	Prime Deportiva	Cable television	Unknown		
BBC World Service Television	BBC World	Cable television	January 26		
TV! Channel	INTRO Television	Cable and satellite	September		

=== Closures ===
Network	Type	End date	Notes	Sources
Prime Sports Upper Midwest	Cable and satellite	December 31		

== Television stations ==
=== Station launches ===
Date	City of license/Market	Station	Channel	Affiliation
January 2	Grundy, VA	WLFG	68	Religious Independent
January 15	Ashland, WI (Duluth, MN)	W25CA	25	America One
January 29	Tice/Fort Myers, FL	WRXY-TV	49	CTN
January 30	Baltimore, MD	W61BT	61	The WB
March 1	Macon, GA	WPGA-TV	58	Fox
March 7	Oklahoma City, OK	K19EA	19	The Box
April 1	Ketchikan, AK	KUBD	4	TBN
April 3	Boston, MA	W32AY	32	Telemundo
April 3	Hartford-New Haven, CT	WTVU	59	The WB
April 5	Hot Springs/Little Rock, AR	KVTH	26	Victory Television Network
May 1	Sitka, AK	K05KH	5	Fox
June	Reno, NV	K47CO	47	Univision
June 1	New Orleans, LA	WUPL	54	UPN
June 2	Houston, TX	KZJK	61	Shop at Home Network
June 5	Littleton, NH	WMUR-LP	29	Fox
June 10	Omaha, NE	KXVO	15	The WB
June 13	Sioux Falls, SD	KCSD-TV	23	PBS / SDPB
June 14	Phoenix, AZ	K69HJ	69	ACN
June 21	Austin, TX	K09VR	9	Independent (Texas Student Media)
June 21	Fort Myers, FL	W59CY	59	Daystar
June 28	Joplin, MO	K44ER	44	unknown
July 10	Laredo, TX	K39EL	39	TBN Enlace USA
July 11	Abilene, TX	K40BM	40	Telemundo
July 11	Kalispell, MT	K52EQ	52	ABC (Note: LPTV translator of KTMF.)
July 13	Manhattan, KS	K21ER	21	Independent
August	North Platte, NE	K11TW	11	UPN
August 7	Wake Forest, NC (Raleigh/Durham)	WRAY-TV	30	Independent
August 12	Bluefield-Beckley, WV	WVGV-TV	59	The WB
August 13	Cedar Rapids, IA	KFXA	28	Fox
August 28	Bangor, ME	WBGR-LP	33	The WB
September 1	Concord, NH	WNBU	21	Independent
September 8	Raleigh, NC	WRAZ	50	The WB
September 22	Phoenix, AZ	KASW	61	The WB
September 27	Albuquerque, NM	K45DL	45	Religious independent
October 6	Albuquerque/Santa Fe, NM	KASY-TV	50	UPN/The WB
October 7	Tamuning, GU	K26HK	26	Independent
October 18	South Bend, IN	W58BT	58	ABC
November 20	Hagåtña, GU	KUAM-LP	20	CBS
November 29	Nashville, TN	WNAB	58	The WB

=== Stations changing network affiliation ===
Date	City of license/Market	Station	Channel	Prior affiliation	New affiliation
January 2	Baltimore, MD	WMAR-TV	2	NBC	ABC
January 2	Baltimore, MD	WBAL-TV	11	CBS	NBC
January 2	Baltimore, MD	WJZ-TV	13	ABC	CBS
January 2	Boston, MA	WBZ-TV	4	NBC	CBS
January 2	Boston, MA	WHDH-TV	7	CBS	NBC
January 9	Phoenix, AZ	KTVK	3	ABC (Note: KTVK only aired ABC's daytime and primetime programming at the point of disaffiliation; the piecemeal dropping of ABC shows from the station throughout the latter half of 1994 resulted in KNXV-TV carrying all ABC News programming from December 1994 onward.)	Independent (Note: Temporarily carried The WB during part of 1995 before transferring the affiliation to KASW upon that station's sign-on.)
January 9	Phoenix, AZ	KNXV-TV	15	Independent	ABC
January 16	Flint/Saginaw, MI	WNEM-TV	5	NBC	CBS
January 16	Flint/Saginaw, MI	WEYI-TV	25	CBS	NBC
January 16	San Antonio, TX	KABB	29	Independent	Fox
January 16	San Antonio, TX	KRRT	35	Fox	UPN
January 31	Terre Haute, IN	WBAK-TV	38	ABC	Fox
March 6	Sacramento/Stockton, CA	KXTV	10	CBS	ABC
March 6	Sacramento/Stockton, CA	KOVR	13	ABC	CBS
March 13	Seattle/Tacoma, WA	KIRO-TV	7	CBS	UPN
March 13	Seattle/Tacoma, WA	KSTW	11	Independent	CBS
July 1	Austin, TX	KTBC	7	CBS	Fox
July 1	Austin, TX	KBVO-TV	42	Fox	CBS
July 1	Dallas/Fort Worth, TX	KDFW	4	CBS	Fox
July 1	Dallas/Fort Worth, TX	KTVT	11	Independent	CBS
July 1	Dallas/Fort Worth, TX	KDAF	33	Fox	The WB
July 1	Dallas/Fort Worth, TX	KXTX-TV	39	The WB	Independent
August 7	Providence, RI/New Bedford, MA	WLNE-TV	6	CBS	ABC
August 7	Providence, RI/New Bedford, MA	WPRI-TV	12	ABC	CBS
August 7	St. Louis, MO	KTVI	2	ABC	Fox
August 7	St. Louis, MO	KDNL-TV	30	Fox	ABC
August 13	Dubuque, IA	KFXB-TV	40	ABC	Fox
August 14	Rockford, IL	WREX	13	ABC	NBC
August 14	Rockford, IL	WTVO	17	NBC	ABC
August 28	Green Bay/Appleton, WI	WLUK-TV	11	NBC	Fox
August 28	Green Bay/Appleton, WI	WGBA-TV	26	Fox	NBC
September 3	Greensboro/Winston-Salem, NC	WGHP	8	ABC	Fox
September 3	Greensboro/Winston-Salem, NC	WXLV-TV (Note: Known as WRNW-TV prior to the affiliation switch.)	45	Fox	ABC
September 3	Greensboro/Winston-Salem, NC	WGGT-TV (Note: Satellite of WXLV.)	48	Fox	ABC
September 3	Greenville/Spartanburg, SC	WFBC-TV	40	ABC (Note: As a semi-satellite of WLOS under the WAXA calls.)	Independent
September 7	Raleigh/Durham/Goldsboro, NC	WNCN	17	The WB	NBC
September 7	Raleigh/Durham/Goldsboro, NC	WRDC	28	NBC	UPN
September 10	Denver, CO	KCNC-TV	4	NBC	CBS
September 10	Denver, CO	KMGH-TV	7	CBS	ABC
September 10	Denver, CO	KUSA	9	ABC	NBC
September 10	Philadelphia, PA	KYW-TV	3	NBC	CBS
September 10	Philadelphia, PA	WCAU-TV	10	CBS	NBC
September 10	Salt Lake City, UT	KUTV	2	NBC	CBS
September 10	Salt Lake City, UT	KSL-TV	5	CBS	NBC
October 10	West Point, MS	WLOV-TV	27	ABC	Fox
October 18	South Bend, IN	WSJV	28	ABC	Fox
October 28	Toledo, OH	WTVG	13	NBC	ABC
October 28	Toledo, OH	WNWO-TV	24	ABC	NBC
December 1	Memphis, TN	WHBQ-TV	13	ABC	Fox
December 1	Memphis, TN	WPTY-TV	24	Fox	ABC
December 2	Evansville, IN	WTVW	7	ABC	Fox
December 2	Evansville, IN	WEHT	25	CBS	ABC
December 2	Evansville, IN	WEVV-TV	44	Fox	CBS
December 16	Harrisburg/Lancaster, PA	WLYH-TV	15	CBS	UPN

=== Stations changing channel numbers ===
Date	City of license/Market	Station	Affiliation	Prior channel	New channel
September 10	Miami/Fort Lauderdale, FL	WTVJ	NBC	4	6 (Note: Exchanged network affiliations, intellectual property and all off- and on-air staff; now NBC owned-and-operated WTVJ.)
September 10	Miami/Fort Lauderdale, FL	WCIX → WFOR-TV	CBS	6	4 (Note: Exchanged network affiliations, intellectual property and all off- and on-air staff; now CBS owned-and-operated WFOR-TV.)

== Births ==
Date	Name	Notability
January 4	Maddie Hasson	Actress (The Finder, Twisted)
January 8	Ryan Destiny	Actress
January 9	Nicola Peltz	Actress (Bates Motel)
January 13	Natalia Dyer	Actress (Stranger Things)
January 13	Qaasim Middleton	Actor (The Naked Brothers Band)
January 24	Dylan Everett	Canadian actor (Degrassi: The Next Generation)
January 24	Callan McAuliffe	Actor
January 27	Malika Andrews	American sports journalist
January 30	Danielle Campbell	Actress (The Originals)
February 8	Jordan Todosey	Canadian actress (Degrassi: The Next Generation)
February 23	Zion Moreno	Actress (Control Z, Gossip Girl)
February 24	Brittany Raymond	Actress
February 28	Quinn Shephard	Actress
March 2	Veronica Dunne	Actress (K.C. Undercover)
March 7	Haley Lu Richardson	Actress (Ravenswood, Recovery Road)
March 10	Grace Victoria Cox	Actress (Under the Dome)
March 27	Taylor Atelian	Actress (According To Jim)
March 29	Marc Musso	Actor
April 1	Logan Paul	Actor and pro wrestler (Logan Paul VS., Foursome, WWE)
April 9	Cierra Ramirez	Actress (The Secret Life of the American Teenager, The Fosters, Good Trouble)
April 12	Miguel Luciano	Actor (Talia in the Kitchen)
April 15	Cody Christian	Actor (Pretty Little Liars, Teen Wolf)
April 21	Thomas Doherty	Scottish actor (The Lodge, Descendants, Gossip Girl)
April 23	Gigi Hadid	Actress (The Real Housewives of Beverly Hills)
May 1	Jake Cannavale	Actor
May 4	Shameik Moore	Actor (Incredible Crew, The Get Down)
May 6	Tiera Skovbye	Canadian actress (Riverdale)
May 12	Kenton Duty	Actor (Shake It Up)
May 12	Luke Benward	Actor (Ravenswood)
May 12	Sawyer Sweeten (d.2015)	Actors (Everybody Loves Raymond)
May 12	Sullivan Sweeten	Actors (Everybody Loves Raymond)
June 2	Sterling Beaumon	Actor (Lost, The Killing)
June 20	Serayah	Actress (Empire)
June 20	Aidan Drummond	Canadian actor (The Collector)
June 21	Andrew Dismukes	Comedian
July 2	Nicole Alyse Nelson	Actress (I Am Frankie)
July 7	Chloe Greenfield	Actress (ER)
July 9	Georgie Henley	Actress (The Chronicles of Narnia)
July 13	Sam Straley	Actor (The Kids Are Alright)
July 26	Tessa Blanchard	Pro wrestler (WWE, TNA)
August 4	Jessica Sanchez	Singer (American Idol)
August 7	Kris Statlander	Pro wrestler (AEW)
August 12	Austin Zajur	Actor
August 18	Parker McKenna Posey	Actress (My Wife and Kids)
August 19	Patrick Clark	Pro wrestler and contestant on Tough Enough
August 20	Lulu Antariksa	Actress (How to Rock)
August 26	Gracie Dzienny	Actress (Supah Ninjas)
August 28	Ben Petry	Actor
September 5	Caroline Sunshine	Actress (Shake It Up)
September 12	Ryan Potter	Actor (Supah Ninjas, Lab Rats: Elite Force, Titans), voice actor (Big Hero 6: The Series)
September 16	Victory Van Tuyl	Actress (Marvin Marvin)
September 17	Patrick Mahomes	Football player
September 18	Megan Lee	Actress (Make It Pop)
September 19	Natalia Wójcik	Voice actress (Annie on Little Einsteins)
September 20	Sammi Hanratty	Actress
October 3	Ayo Edebiri	Actress (Big Mouth, The Bear)
October 10	Da'Vinchi	Actor and rapper (All American, BMF)
October 15	Billy Unger	Actor (Lab Rats, Lab Rats: Elite Force)
October 23	Ireland Baldwin	Actress and daughter of Alec Baldwin and Kim Basinger
October 25	Conchita Campbell	Actress (The 4400)
October 30	Rachel Hilson	Actress (Love, Victor)
October 31	Mateo Arias	Actor (Kickin' It)
November 2	Brandon Soo Hoo	Actor (Incredible Crew, From Dusk till Dawn: The Series)
November 3	Kendall Jenner	Actress (Keeping Up with the Kardashians)
November 13	Stella Hudgens	Actress
November 16	Noah Gray-Cabey	Actor (My Wife and Kids, Heroes)
November 22	Katherine McNamara	Actress and singer (Shadowhunters)
November 29	Laura Marano	Actress (Without a Trace, The X's, Back to You, Austin & Ally)
December 12	C.J. LeBlanc	Actor (NCIS: New Orleans, Queen Sugar)
December 18	Elizabeth Stanton	Actress
December 29	Ross Lynch	Actor (Austin & Ally, Chilling Adventures of Sabrina) and singer (R5)
December 29	Nick Merico	Actor (Every Witch Way)

== Deaths ==
Date	Name	Age	Notability
February 5	Doug McClure	59	Actor (The Virginian)
February 9	David Wayne	81	Actor (Ellery Queen)
February 22	Ed Flanders	60	Actor (St. Elsewhere)
March 28	Hugh O'Connor	32	Actor (Lonnie Jamison on In the Heat of the Night)
April 23	Howard Cosell	77	Sports journalist/commentator (Monday Night Football)
April 25	Art Fleming	70	Original host of (Jeopardy!)
May 18	Elizabeth Montgomery	62	Actress (Samantha Stephens on Bewitched)
May 26	Friz Freleng	88	Animator (Looney Tunes)
June 30	Gale Gordon	89	Actor (The Lucy Show)
July 4	Eva Gabor	76	Hungarian-born actress (Lisa Douglas on Green Acres)
August 3	Ida Lupino	77	Actress & director
August 11	Phil Harris	91	Actor (The Phil Harris-Alice Faye Show)
August 24	Gary Crosby	62	Actor (Adam-12)
August 24	Sam Bagarella	44	Art director (Fifteen, Weinerville, Hi Honey, I'm Home, Welcome Freshman, Allegra's Window)
October 4	Linda Gary	50	Actress, Voice Actress (Spider-Man)
October 4	Fred Holliday	59	Actor
December 2	Roxie Roker	66	Actress (The Jeffersons)
December 25	Dean Martin	78	Singer, actor and host (The Dean Martin Show)

== Television debuts ==
- Anthony Anderson – In the House
- Justin Chambers- Another World
- Michael Clarke Duncan – The Bold and the Beautiful
- Mike Epps – Def Comedy Jam
- Lee Evans – The World of Lee Evans
- Will Ferrell – Saturday Night Live
- Darrell Hammond – Saturday Night Live
- Chris Kattan – NewsRadio
- Ron Livingston – JAG
- Cheri Oteri – Saturday Night Live
- Anna Nicole Smith – The Naked Truth
- Dave Willis – Cartoon Planet

== See also ==
- 1995 in the United States
- List of American films of 1995
