= Alex Cubis =

Australian actor

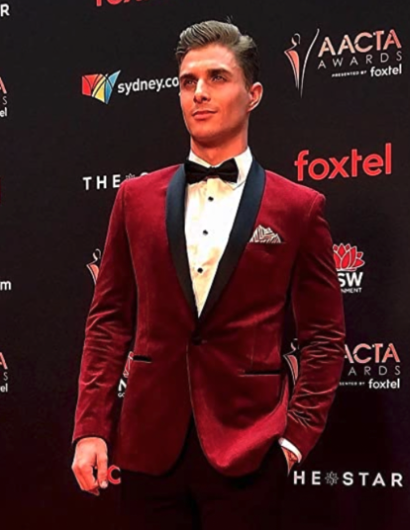
- Cubis at the 2019 AACTAs
- Born: Sydney, Australia
- Education: The University of Sydney, St Aloysius' College (Sydney)
- Occupation: Actor
- Years active: 2015–present

Alexander Cubis is an Australian actor, known for his roles on Netflix fantasy series Mako Mermaids, Paramount+ thriller series Ruthless and vampire romance action series, Black Dagger Brotherhood. He will appear in the upcoming feature film Tender . Cubis has also appeared in eOne drama series Between Two Worlds, Dear White People, Rake and Unverified for Funny or Die. He was named one of Who Magazine’s Sexiest People.

== Education ==
Cubis attended St. Aloysius' College, where he was Dux. He then received a scholarship to study a Bachelor of Arts/Bachelor of Laws at the University of Sydney where he was an editor on the Social Justice Law Review, and resided at St. Andrew's College. While a student, he was signed to Chadwick Models. In the United States, Cubis passed the New York Bar Exam.

== Career ==
=== Australia ===
In 2015, Cubis starred as evil merman Erik in Mako: Island of Secrets (known internationally as Mako Mermaids). The series was created by Jonathan M. Shiff and streams on Netflix.

In 2017, Cubis starred as the lovable son in a Western suburbs family in the world premiere of the National Theatre production at Riverside Theatres of The Incredible Here and Now alongside Caroline Brazier, which was directed by Wayne Harrison.

In 2019, Cubis joined the cast of Seven Network’s Between Two Worlds as AFL player Danny Grey, directed by Kriv Stenders and created by Bevan Lee. The series was released in 2020 and was acquired by Entertainment One for international distribution. Cubis was named the series' "breakout star."

=== United States ===
In the United States, Cubis was cast as a social worker opposite Oscar-nominee Sally Kirkland in feature film Hope for the Holidays and played a drug dealer alongside Lenny Von Dohlen and Estella Warren in Just Within Reach.

In 2021, Cubis joined the cast of the Paramount+ Tyler Perry directed suspense drama series, Ruthless, as a hitchhiker confronting a mysterious cult.

In August 2024, Cubis was cast alongside David Koechner, Jesse Garcia and Jess Weixler in the feature film, Tender.

In October 2024, Cubis was announced as a leading cast member in the TV series adaptation of JR Ward's vampire The Black Dagger Brotherhood ] book series, directed by Tosca Musk. The second season was announced in early 2026, with Cubis reprising his leading role as the warrior vampire, Rhage.

== Other work ==
Cubis hosted the podcast Honest Conversations for Nova Entertainment and also produced the film project Rocket Man.

He was an ambassador for the 2020 MEN-tality project and Beyond Blue, alongside David Wenham, Ryan Corr and Guy Sebastian. Cubis also starred in a Ralph Lauren digital campaign.

== Filmography ==
=== Film ===
List of acting performances in film
Year	Title	Role	Notes	Source
2017	Just Within Reach	Mike		
2019	Rocket Man	Paul	Short film. Also writer, co-producer	
2020	Hope for the Holidays	Scott Carter	Amazon Prime film	

=== Television ===
List of acting performances in television
Year	Title	Role	Notes	Source
2015	Mako Mermaids	Erik	Main role, series 2	
2016	Rake	Kyle Mannix		
2017	Unverified	Andrew	Funny or Die web series. Also creator	
2018	Dear White People	Nicolas	Netflix series, Volume 2, Chapter III	
2020	Between Two Worlds	Danny Grey		
2020 - 2024	Ruthless	Aaron	31 episodes	
2025–present	The Black Dagger Brotherhood	Rhage	Main role	

=== Theatre ===
List of acting performances in theatre
Dates	Title	Role	Production	Notes
2017	The Incredible Here and Now	Dom	National Theatre of Parramatta	
