= Alex Torres =

Alex Torres may refer to:

- Alex Torres (baseball), Venezuelan baseball player
- Alex Torres (musician), American metal/rock musician

== See also ==
- Alessandra Torre (U.S. novelist), erotica author
