= Passionflix =

American movie-streaming platform

- Website type: OTT platform
- Founded: May 2017; 9 years ago
- Headquarters: (United States) Atlanta, Georgia
- Area served: Original contents: Worldwide; Licensed contents: U.S. only
- Founders: Tosca Musk; Joany Kane; Jina Panebianco
- Key people: Tosca Musk (CEO)
- Industry: Entertainment
- Products: Streaming Media; Video on Demand
- Services: Film Production; Film Distribution
- Website: passionflix.com
- Registration: Required

Passionflix is an entertainment streaming platform and production company. Founded in 2017 by director and producer Tosca Musk, screenwriter Joany Kane, and producer Jina Panebianco, it focuses on releasing original film adaptations of the best-selling romantic novels, while also streaming classic romantic movies. Passionflix also makes erotic thrillers.

The Hollywood Reporter describes Passionflix productions in general as "saucier than Hallmark but much tamer than porn, tamer even than some R-rated movies." No frontal nudity below the waist is shown. As co-founder and CEO Tosca Musk explains, "Passionflix is there to remove shame from sexuality... We are there to encourage connection, communication and compromise in relationships and we’re there to validate emotions." Movies and television series on this platform are categorized according to a "barometer of naughtiness" ranging from "Oh so vanilla" (for romantic comedies) to "NSFW" (not safe for work). The New York Times characterizes these as having "simple" plots and "sometimes unrefined" acting. Wired opines that the "acting is good, the actors are hot, and the plots deliver; don’t ask about the cinematography." Each film has a budget of no more than $10 million and is typically shot within a fortnight. "Founding members" or "Signature members"—fans who paid a premium subscription—have the right to be on set during filming and offer their views on what should be done. Some might even appear as extras. Musk likens this form of fan service to having her own "focus group" on set.

Although the platform is technically available worldwide, licensed content can only be watched in the United States. Subtitles are available in nine languages.

== Company history ==
In 2015, Joany Kane conceived of a movie-streaming service focusing on romance—a "Netflix for women"—dubbed Passionflix. Tosca Musk and Jina Panebianco joined Kane in her efforts to create this platform and Passionflix was officially launched in May 2017. The streaming service went online September 1, that same year. Musk stated that her goal was to capture the market for adaptations of romance novels, a genre generally neglected by Hollywood, and to tell these stories from the female perspective. Musk, Kane, and Panebianco take advantage of their prior experience making television films, which can be produced more quickly and affordably than those on Netflix. But Musk maintains that her company does not compete with Netflix because it aims at a niche market. She complains that mainstream entertainment productions "tend to be more about the victimization of women than they are about sexually free or sexually empowered stories about women" and that "I kept getting into conflicts with network executives, who were not interested in stories about empowered women embracing their sexuality." Although the customer base is predominantly women, the number of subscribers who are men has been growing. For the first three years of Passionflix, Maye Musk (Tosca's mother) ran the company's Instagram account.

Although the company was originally headquartered in Los Angeles, Musk decided to leave California for the Atlanta metropolitan area in 2021 during the COVID-19 pandemic in order to advantage of the State of Georgia's tax incentives for film production, the low cost of living and housing for the company's employees, and the quality of public schools for their children. At a public screening of the company's first film, Hollywood Dirt (2017), Musk persuaded 4,000 people to pre-pay $100 each for a two-year subscription. She then used this money to convince potential investors that there was merit in her business idea. In 2020, Musk managed to raise $4.75 million in venture capital funding for her new company. In 2022, she received another $9.4 million in investment. Investors in Passionflix include Jason Calacanis, Kimbal Musk (Tosca's and Elon's brother), Lyn and Norman Lear, among others.

Initially, each original film was produced for just around a million dollars ($100M). But the budget steadily grew as the company moved towards producing series and historical romance movies. By 2024, Passionflix has reached a stage where the company's name is no longer unknown to romance authors, making it less challenging to negotiate an adaptation.

In late January 2025, hundreds of customers canceled their Passionflix subscriptions in response to Tosca's public support of her brother after he was accused of giving a Nazi salute. In early June, the Passionflix website temporarily went offline due to a surge of visitors. This incident coincided with the public altercation between Elon Musk and Donald Trump. Tosca Musk used this opportunity to promote her company's new series The Black Dagger Brotherhood, an adaptation of paranormal romance novels of the same name by J.R. Ward.

== Films ==
Year	Film	Cast	Novel
2017	Hollywood Dirt	Emma Rigby, Johann Urb	Hollywood Dirt by Alessandra Torre
2017	Afterburn/Aftershock	Caitlyn Leahy, Tyler Johnson	Afterburn/Aftershock by Sylvia Day
2017	The Trouble With Mistletoe	Rachel Melvin, Thomas Beaudoin	The Trouble With Mistletoe by Jill Shalvis
2018	The Matchmaker's Playbook	Nick Bateman, Caitlin Carver	The Matchmaker's Playbook by Rachel Van Dyken
2018	Mr. 365	Chelsea Hobbs, Christopher Russell	Mr. 365 by Ruth Clampett
2019	The Protector	Emma Rigby, Diarmaid Murtagh	The Protector by Jodi Ellen Malpas
2019	A Brother's Honor	Jeremy Batiste, Celestine Rae	A Brother's Honor by Brenda Jackson
2019	Dirty Sexy Saint	Jordan Lane Price, David A. Gregory	Dirty Sexy Saint by Carly Phillips and Erika Wilde
2020	The Will	Megan Dodds, Chris L. McKenna	The Will by Kristen Ashley
May 2020	Gabriel's Inferno Part I	Melanie Zanetti, Giulio Berruti	Gabriel's Inferno by Sylvain Reynard
July 2020	Gabriel's Inferno Part II	Melanie Zanetti, Giulio Berruti	Gabriel's Inferno by Sylvain Reynard
November 2020	Gabriel's Inferno Part III	Melanie Zanetti, Giulio Berruti	Gabriel's Inferno by Sylvain Reynard
May 2021	Wicked	Anna Maiche, Liam Hall	Wicked by Jennifer L. Armentrout
October 2021	Seduction and Snacks	Mela Green, Vince Hill-Bedford	Seduction & Snacks by Tara Sivec
November 2021	Gabriel's Rapture Part 1	Melanie Zanetti, Giulio Berruti	Gabriel's Rapture by Sylvain Reynard
February 2022	Tangled	Katherine Hughes, Josh Plasse	Tangled by Emma Chase
March 2022	Gabriel's Rapture Part 2	Melanie Zanetti, Giulio Berruti	Gabriel's Rapture by Sylvain Reynard
July 2022	Resisting Roots	Elizabeth Posey, Lou Ferrigno Jr.	Resisting Roots by Audrey Carlan
August 2022	Gabriel's Rapture Part 3	Melanie Zanetti, Giulio Berruti	Gabriel's Rapture by Sylvain Reynard
October 2022	Torn	Anna Maiche, Liam Hall	Torn by Jennifer L. Armentrout
March 2023	Wait With Me	Madison Lawlor, Andrew Biernat	Wait With Me by Amy Daws
June 2023	Gabriel's Redemption Part 1	Melanie Zanetti, Giulio Berruti	Gabriel's Redemption by Sylvain Reynard
October 2023	Gabriel's Redemption Part 2	Melanie Zanetti, Giulio Berruti	Gabriel's Redemption by Sylvain Reynard
December 2023	Gabriel's Redemption Part 3	Melanie Zanetti, Giulio Berruti	Gabriel's Redemption by Sylvain Reynard
April 2024	Wallbanger	Kelli Berglund, Amadeus Serafini	Wallbanger by Alice Clayton
August 2024	The Air He Breathes	Kelcie Stranahan, Ryan Carnes	The Air He Breathes by Brittainy C. Cherry
October 2024	A Man's Promise	Jasmine Johnson, Michael Marcel	A Man's Promise by Brenda Jackson
December 2024	Lick	Brooke Lee, Travis Burns	Lick by Kylie Scott
February 2025	A Lover's Vow	Dayna Dooley, Robert Christopher Riley	A Lover's Vow by Brenda Jackson
December 2025	Beauty from Pain	Samantha Allsop, Jackson Galagher	Beauty from Pain by Georgia Cates
February 2026	Royally Screwed	Jenny Boyd, Max Rinehart	Royally Screwed by Emma Chase

== TV series ==
Year	Series	Cast	Novel	Episodes
2018	Driven season 1	Olivia Applegate, Casey Deidrick	Driven by K. Bromberg	6
2021	Driven season 2	Olivia Applegate, Michael Roark	Fueled by K. Bromberg	4
May 2022	Driven season 3	Olivia Applegate, Michael Roark	Crashed by K. Bromberg	6
December 2022	The Secret Life of Amy Bensen season 1	Maddie McCormick, Casey King	The Secret Life of Amy Bensen by Lisa Renee Jones	6
August 2023	The Secret Life of Amy Bensen season 2	Maddie McCormick, Casey King	The Secret Life of Amy Bensen by Lisa Renee Jones	6
June 2025	The Black Dagger Brotherhood season 1	Olivia Applegate, Robert Maaser	Dark Lover by J. R. Ward	6
Oct 2026	The Black Dagger Brotherhood season 2	Olivia Applegate, Robert Maaser	Lover Eternal by J. R. Ward	6

== Quickie short films ==
Year	Film	Cast	Novel
2018	A Quickie	Tyler Johnson, Emily Peck	A Quickie by Jodi Ellen Malpas
2018	Dry Spell	Jes Meza, Anthony Bless	Dry Spell by Vi Keeland
2018	Wrapped Up in You	Thomas Hobson, James Austin Kerr	Wrapped Up In You by Ella Frank and Brooke Blaine
2019	The Naughty List	James Paladino	The Naughty List by Emma Chase
2020	Sexy Scrooge	Rachele Schank, Greg Perrow	Sexy Scrooge by Vi Keeland and Penelope Ward
2020	A Holiday Lift	Karla Mosley, Blake Cooper Griffin	A Holiday Lift by Corinne Michaels
2020	Just Say When	Keelin Woodell, Khylin Rhambo	Just Say When by Jill Shalvis
2020	The Package	Heather Grace Hancock, Coby Ryan McLaughlin	The Package by K. Bromberg
2020	The Merry Mistake	Jacqi Vene, Geovanni Gopradi	The Merry Mistake by Vi Keeland and Penelope Ward
2021	Hooked	Nicola Bertram, Jamison Jones	Hooked by Nina Bocci
2022	Dirty Sweet Valentine	Mayumi Roller, Jason Coviello	Dirty Sweet Valentine by Laurelin Paige
