= Giulio Berruti =

Italian film and television actor

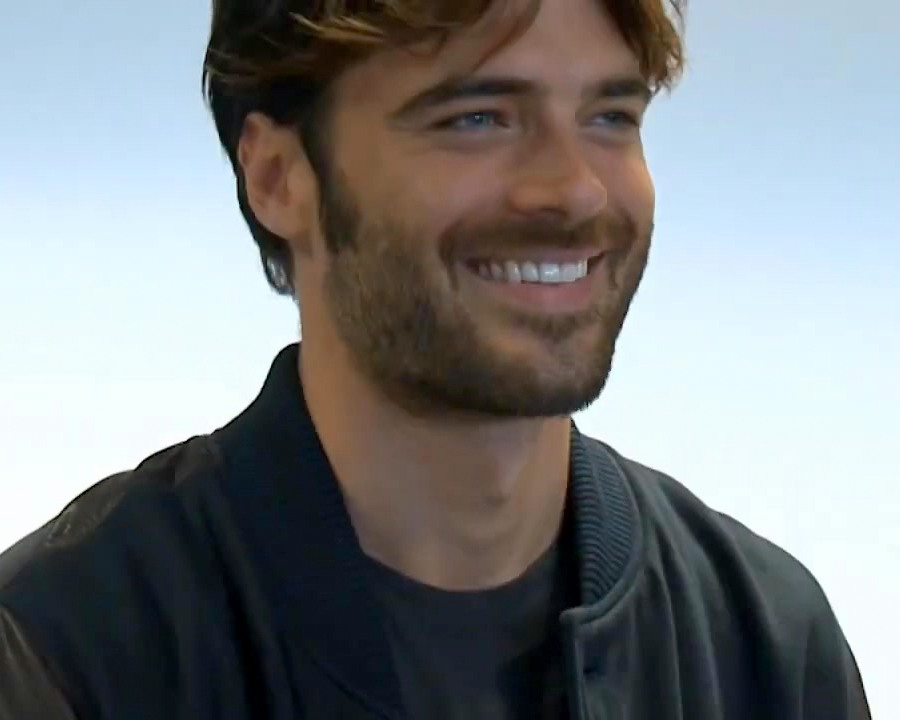
- Berruti in 2015
- Born: Giulio Maria Berruti; 27 September 1984 (age 42); Rome, Italy
- Education: University of Rome Tor Vergata
- Occupations: Actor, producer
- Years active: 2003–present

Giulio Berruti (born 27 September 1984) is an Italian actor, known for his roles in Monte Carlo (2011), Walking on Sunshine (2014), and the Gabriel's Inferno movie series.

== Life and career ==
Berruti was born in Rome, Italy, to ophthalmologist Giuseppe Berruti of Moncalvo and lawyer Francesca Romana Reggiani. He has an older brother, Gian Luca Berruti, lieutenant colonel of the Guardia di Finanza.

After obtaining a scientific high school diploma and a professional dental technician diploma, Berruti attended the University of Rome Tor Vergata School of Dentistry, and graduated in Dentistry and dental prosthesis in 2010. He subsequently undertook the specialization in Orthodontics and achieved it in 2015.

Berruti, who is 190 cm tall, had a fashion model career while in school, walking runways and participating in several fashion campaigns, for about three years since 1998. In 2003, he made his debut with a small role in the film The Lizzie McGuire Movie. He began rising to fame after appearing in Melissa P., La figlia di Elisa – Ritorno a Rivombrosa and Bon Appétit. In 2011, he starred in the film Monte Carlo and in 2014 he played the lead role in the musical comedy Walking on Sunshine.

In 2019, Berruti was cast by producer Tosca Musk of Passionflix, to play the main role of Gabriel Emerson in the novel adaptation of Gabriel's Inferno and its sequels.

Since 2020, Berruti has a relationship with the Italian politician Maria Elena Boschi.

== Filmography ==
=== Film ===
Year	Title	Role(s)	Notes
2003	The Lizzie McGuire Movie	Italian Guy #2	Cameo appearance
2005	Melissa P.	Roberto	
2007	Scrivilo sui muri	Cosmos	
2008	Deadly Kitesurf	Dario	
2010	Bon Appétit	Hugo	
2011	Monte Carlo	Prince Domenico da Silvano	
2012	Goltzius and the Pelican Company	Thomas Boethius	
2012	10 Rules for Falling in Love	Ettore	
2012	Love Is Not Perfect	Marco	
2014	Walking on Sunshine	Raf	
2015	Tutte lo vogliono	Raffaello De Angelis	
2016	L'amore che vorrei	Dr. Nardella	Short film
2017	Body of Deceit	Castellano	
2018	Magical Nights	Max Andrei	
2018	Show Dogs	Dante (voice)	Italian voice-over
2018	La ricetta della mamma	Mico Torre	Short film
2020	Downhill	Guglielmo	
2020	Gabriel's Inferno: Part 1	Gabriel Emerson	
2020	Gabriel's Inferno: Part 2	Gabriel Emerson	
2020	Gabriel's Inferno: Part 3	Gabriel Emerson	
2021	Hitman's Wife's Bodyguard	Yacht Guard	Cameo appearance
2021	Gabriel's Rapture: Part 1	Gabriel Emerson	
2021	Gabriel's Rapture: Part 2	Gabriel Emerson	
2021	Girls to Buy	Sam	
2022	Across the River and into the Trees	Antonio Ferrigo	
2022	Gabriel's Rapture: Part 3	Gabriel Emerson	
2023	Gabriel's Redemption: Part 1	Gabriel Emerson	
2023	Gabriel's Redemption: Part 2	Gabriel Emerson	
2023	Gabriel's Redemption: Part 3	Gabriel Emerson	
2023	My Mother's Wedding	Extra	Uncredited
TBA	The Brush Off †		Filming

=== Television ===
Year	Title	Role(s)	Notes
2006	La freccia nera	Thomas	6 episodes
2007	La figlia di Elisa – Ritorno a Rivombrosa	Andrea Casalegno Van Necker	8 episodes
2009	Il falco e la colomba	Goulio Branciforte	6 episodes
2011	La ragazza americana	Vasco	Two-parts television movie
2011	Angeli e diamanti	Giuseppe	3 episodes
2011	Sangue caldo	Manuele Signori	5 episodes
2014	Ballando con le Stelle	Himself / Contestant	Reality competition (season 10)
2014	I segreti di Borgo Larici	Francesco Sormani	6 episodes
2016	Matrimoni e altre follie	Rocco Borgia Rispoli	24 episodes
2016	Squadra antimafia – Il ritorno del boss	Carlo Nigro	8 episodes
2018	È arrivata la felicità	Charming Prince	Guest star (season 2)
2019	Pezzi unici	Roberto	2 episodes

== Writing ==
Berruti released an Italian novel called Nutshell in 2018.
