= Between Two Worlds (TV series) =

- Genre: Drama
- Created by: Bevan Lee
- Written by: Bevan Lee
- Directed by: Kriv Stenders; Lynn Hegarty; Caroline Bell-Booth; Beck Cole; Michael Hurst
- Country of origin: Australia
- Original language: English
- No. of series: 1
- No. of episodes: 10

Production
- Executive producer: Julie McGauran
- Producer: Chris Martin-Jones
- Running time: 60 minutes
- Production company: Seven Studios

Original release
- Network: Seven Network
- Release: 26 July – 6 September 2020

Between Two Worlds is an Australian television drama series which premiered on the Seven Network on 26 July 2020.

== Plot ==
The series revolves around two families. The Walford family is headed by wealthy tycoon Phillip Walford, his wife Cate and privileged son Bart. Their world is penthouses, luxury cars and designer offices. The Grey family consists of single mother Sophia, footballer son Danny, and daughter Bella. Their world is suburbia, work and sport. The two worlds become linked by an unexpected incident.

== Cast ==
- Philip Quast as Phillip Walford
- Hermione Norris as Cate Walford
- Sara Wiseman as Sophia Grey
- Aaron Jeffery as David Starke
- Alex Cubis as Danny Grey
- Megan Hajjar as Bella Grey
- Tom Dalzell as Bart Walford
- Melanie Jarnson as Georgia Konig
- Marny Kennedy as Martina Budd
- Gabriella Hirschson as Carrie Starke
- Andrew McFarlane as Gareth König
- Dominic Alburn as Mikael Stein
- Craig Hall as Detective Gordon Taylor

== Production ==
The series began filming in Sydney in April 2019. The series was created by Bevan Lee.

== Release ==
The series premiered on the Seven Network at 8:30 p.m. on 26 July 2020.

== Reception ==
Poor ratings after the second episode led Seven to reschedule the show to a late night timeslot. Despite the series ending on a cliffhanger, Seven axed the show after one season.

== Episodes ==
| No. overall | No. in series | Episode | Directed by | Written by | Original release date | Aus. viewers |
|---|---|---|---|---|---|---|
| 1 | 1 | "Episode 1" | Kriv Stenders | Bevan Lee | 26 July 2020 | 419,000 |
| 2 | 2 | "Episode 2" | Kriv Stenders | Bevan Lee | 2 August 2020 | 279,000 |
| 3 | 3 | "Episode 3" | Lynn Hegarty | Bevan Lee | 9 August 2020 | 171,000 |
| 4 | 4 | "Episode 4" | Lynn Hegarty | Bevan Lee | 16 August 2020 | 171,000 |
| 5 | 5 | "When World’s Collide" | Caroline Bell-Booth | Bevan Lee | 23 August 2020 | 126,000 |
| 6 | 6 | "Leith The Fall" | Caroline Bell-Booth | Bevan Lee | 23 August 2020 | 104,000 |
| 7 | 7 | "A Big Enough Lie" | Beck Cole | Bevan Lee | 30 August 2020 | 122,000 |
| 8 | 8 | "Cushioned Chamber and Padded Cell" | Beck Cole | Bevan Lee | 30 August 2020 | 69,000 |
| 9 | 9 | "The Leader And The Led" | Michael Hurst | Trent Atkinson | 6 September 2020 | 131,000 |
| 10 | 10 | "A Dog and a Man" | Michael Hurst | Bevan Lee | 6 September 2020 | 90,000 |
