= Black Dagger Brotherhood =

Paranormal romance series by J. R. Ward

The Black Dagger Brotherhood is an ongoing series of paranormal romance books by author J. R. Ward. The series focuses on a society (the "Black Dagger Brotherhood") of vampire warriors who live together and defend their race against de-souled humans called lessers. The first book in the series was published in 2005.

Ward's Fallen Angels series is set in the same universe, and has some overlap in characters, but little overlap in story lines. It takes place earlier than the main series.

A serial adaptation of these novels was optioned by Passionflix. Season 1 of the television series The Black Dagger Brotherhood was released in 2025.

== Main series ==
Main books following the brothers.

No.	Title	Date	ISBN
0	Darius (prequel)	September 2023	
1	Dark Lover	September 2005	9780451216953
2	Lover Eternal	March 2006	9780451218049
3	Lover Awakened	September 2006	9780451219367
4	Lover Revealed	March 2007	9780451412355
5	Lover Unbound	September 2007	9780451222350
6	Lover Enshrined	June 2008	9780451222725
	Father Mine: Zsadist and Bella's Story (eBook Novella)	October 2008	
	"The Story of Son" (story contained in Dead After Dark anthology )	December 2008	
7	Lover Avenged	April 2009	9780451225856
8	Lover Mine	May 2010	9780451229854
9	Lover Unleashed	March 2011	9780451233165
10	Lover Reborn	March 2012	9780451235848
11	Lover at Last	March 2013	9780451239358
12	The King	April 2014	9780451417053
13	The Shadows	March 2015	9780451417077
14	The Beast	April 2016	9780451475169
15	The Chosen	April 2017	9780451475190
	Dearest Ivie (eBook Novella)	March 2018	
16	The Thief	April 2018	9780451475213
	Prisoner of Night (eBook Novella)	January 2019	
17	The Savior	April 2019	9781501194948
	Where Winter Finds You (Novella)	November 2019	9780349425405
18	The Sinner	March 2020	9781501195099
	A Warm Heart in Winter (Novella)	December 2020	9780349427805
19	Lover Unveiled	April 2021	9780349420530
20	Lover Arisen	April 2022	9780349430829
21	Lassiter	April 2023	9780349430867
22	The Beloved	April 2024	9780349430904
	A Bloom in Winter (novella)	November 2024	
23	Lover Forbidden	September 2025	9780349430782
24	Lover Enthroned	September 2026	
25	Havoc	2027	
26	Wrath	2028	
27	The Scribe Virgin	2029	

- The Black Dagger Brotherhood: An Insider's Guide. October 2008 [2008]. ISBN 978-0-451-22500-9.
- The Black Dagger Brotherhood: 20th Anniversary Insider’s Guide. (2025)
- Black Dagger Brotherhood, box set: Dark Lover, Lover Eternal, Lover Awakened, Lover Unbound, Lover Revealed, Lover Enshrined (2009)

== Spin-off series ==
=== Black Dagger Legacy Series ===
A spin-off series that details the trainees. Runs parallel to the main series.

No.	Title	Date	ISBN
1	Blood Kiss	December 2015	9780451475329
2	Blood Vow	December 2016	9780451475336
3	Blood Fury	January 2018	9780451475343
4	Blood Truth	August 2019	9781501195037

=== Prison Camp Series ===
A spin-off series that follows the inmates of the glymera's secret and notorious prison camp. Runs parallel to the main series.

No.	Title	Date	ISBN
1	The Jackal	August 2020	9781501195068
2	The Wolf	November 2021	9780451475336
3	The Viper	September 2022	9781982179908
4	Brother of Fire: Lost Dagger Society 1	TBD	

=== The Lair of the Wolven Series ===
A spin-off series that follows wolves of the Black Dagger Brotherhood world. Runs parallel to the main series.

No.	Title	Date	ISBN
1	Claimed	July 2021	9781982150372
2	Forever	March 2023	
3	Mine	January 2024	

=== Fallen Angels Series ===
Series set in the same universe, but takes place in an earlier timeline.

No.	Title	Date	ISBN
1	Covet	September 2009	0451228219
2	Crave	October 2010	0451229444
3	Envy	September 2011	0349400202
4	Rapture	September 2012	9780749957001
5	Possession	October 2013	9780451240194
6	Immortal	October 2014	9780451241160

== Suggested reading order ==
Reading order suggested by J.R. Ward.

- Darius (BDB Book # 0.5)
- Dark Lover (BDB Book #1)
- Lover Eternal (BDB Book #2)
- Lover Awakened (BDB Book #3)
- Lover Revealed (BDB Book #4)
- Lover Unbound (BDB Book #5)
- Lover Enshrined (BDB Book #6)
- Father Mine (BDB Book #6.5)
- Lover Avenged (BDB Book #7)
- Covet (Fallen Angels Book #1)
- Lover Mine (BDB Book #8)
- Crave (Fallen Angels Book #2)
- Lover Unleashed (BDB Book #9)
- Envy (Fallen Angels Book #3)
- Lover Reborn (BDB Book #10)
- Rapture (Fallen Angels Book #4)
- Lover At Last (BDB Book #11)
- Possession (Fallen Angels Book #5)
- The King (BDB Book #12)
- Immortal (Fallen Angels Book #6)
- The Shadows (BDB Book #13)
- The Beast (BDB Book #14)
- Blood Kiss (Legacy Book #1)
- Blood Vow (Legacy Book #2)
- The Chosen (BDB Book #15)
- Dearest Ivie (BDB Book #15.5)
- Blood Fury (Legacy Book #3)
- The Thief (BDB Book #16)
- Prisoner of Night (Novella #1)
- The Savior (BDB Book #17)
- Blood Truth (Legacy Book #4)
- Where Winter Finds You (Novella #2)
- The Sinner (BDB Book #18)
- The Jackal (Prison Camp Book #1)
- A Warm Heart in Winter (Novella #3)
- Lover Unveiled (BDB Book #19)
- Claimed (Wolven Book #1)
- The Wolf (Prison Camp #2)
- Lover Arisen (BDB Book #20)
- The Viper (Prison Camp #3)
- Forever (Wolven Book #2)
- Mine (Wolven Book #3)
- Lassiter (BDB Book #3)
- The Beloved (BDB Book #22)
- A Bloom in Winter (Novella #4)
- Lover Forbidden (BDB Book #23)
- Lover Enthroned (BDB Book #24)

Note: 'Prisoner of Night' is a standalone novella in the same world, but does not cover the Brotherhood. 'Where Winter Finds You' and 'A Warm Winter Heart' novellas cover the Brotherhood.
