= Tosca Musk =

South African filmmaker (born 1974)

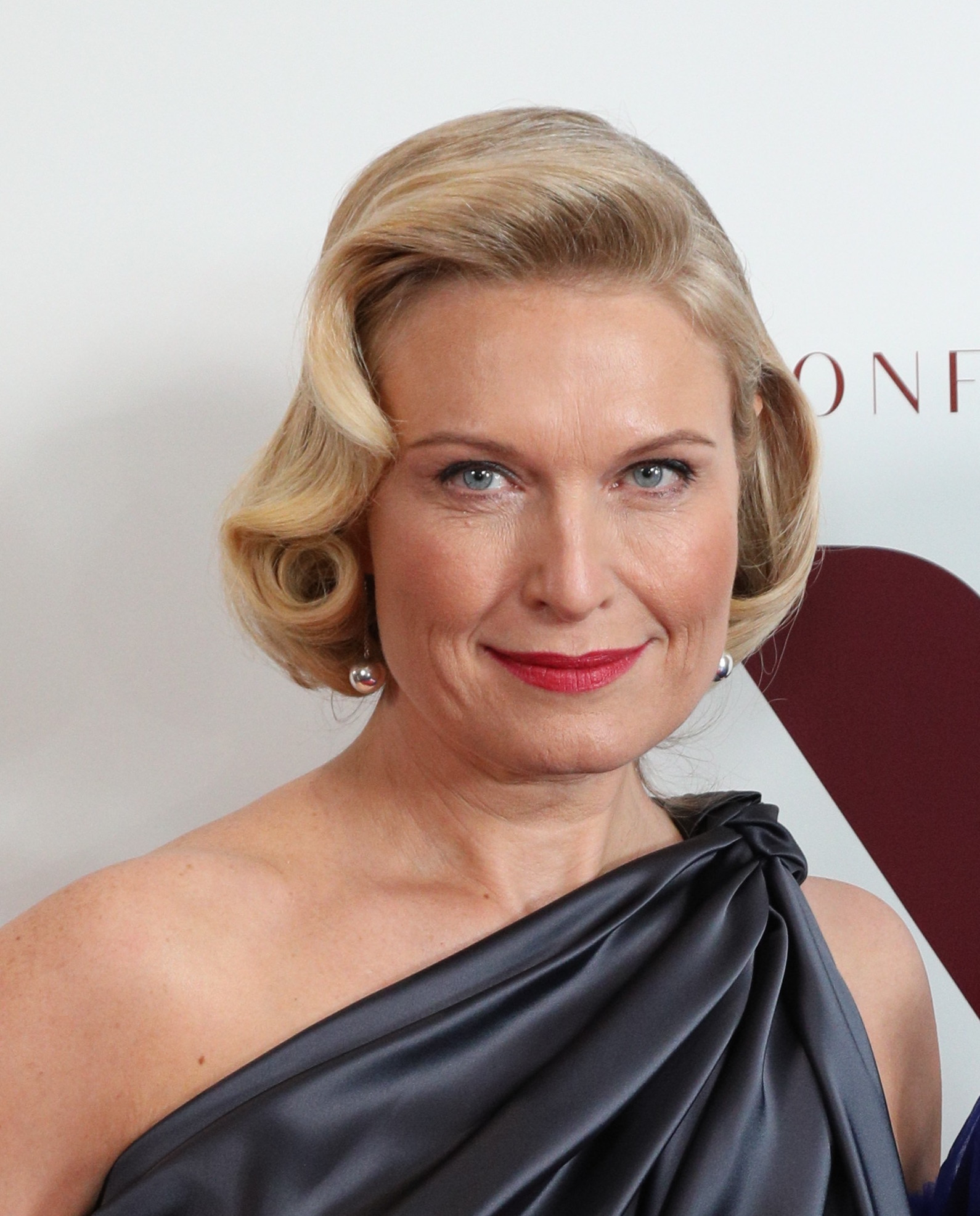
- Musk in 2019
- Born: Tosca Jane Musk; 20 July 1974 (age 52); Pretoria, South Africa
- Citizenship: South Africa, Canada, United States
- Education: University of British Columbia
- Occupation: Filmmaker
- Known for: Passionflix
- Children: 2
- Parents: Errol Musk (father); Maye Musk (mother)
- Relatives: Musk family

Tosca Jane Musk (born 20 July 1974) is a South African filmmaker. She is an executive producer and director of feature films, television programs, and web content. Her work includes the popular television series The Black Dagger Brotherhood, based on J.R. Ward's vampire book series, K. Bromberg's Driven, Rachel van Dyken's Matchmaker's Playbook, and her web series, Tiki Bar TV. Tosca is the younger sister of Elon Musk and Kimbal Musk, and daughter of Errol Musk and Maye Musk. She co-founded the streaming service Passionflix.

== Early life and education ==
Tosca Jane Musk was born in South Africa and grew up in Johannesburg with her two older brothers, Kimbal and Elon. In 1979, her parents, Errol and Maye Musk, divorced. In 1981, Elon moved to live with his father; four years later, Kimbal did so as well. After graduating from high school, Elon moved to Canada; six months later, in 1989, Maye also moved to Canada with Tosca.

== Career ==
Musk produced and directed her first feature film, Puzzled, in 2001 with Musk Entertainment. Elon Musk was the film's executive producer. Soon thereafter, Musk produced the feature film, The Truth About Miranda, since followed by over a dozen features, television movies and series, including the teen horror film, Cruel World, the UK feature, The Heavy and the television drama, We Have Your Husband. In 2011, Musk produced three more television movies, which aired on Lifetime and Hallmark in early 2012.

In 2005, Tosca Musk partnered with Jeff Macpherson to produce the web series Tiki Bar TV. That same year, during the Macworld 2005 Keynote presentation (which introduced the iPod with Video), Steve Jobs showcased Tiki Bar TV to the audience as an example of a video podcast (a relatively new media format at the time) which could be loaded to the new video iPod using Apple's iTunes software.

Tiki Bar TV has been featured in Wired magazine, as well as in other media outlets. In July 2006, the show was featured in a profile on Jeff Macpherson in Forbes magazine's Celebrity 100 Issue as "one of the first breakout stars in the world of Internet television".

Musk is the CEO and co-founder of the OTT streaming platform Passionflix, which The New York Times describes as "sexy Hallmark Channel." Developed in 2017 with writer Joany Kane and producer Jina Panebianco, Passionflix makes movies out of romance novels. As of 2022, it charges customers $6 per month for its service and had raised $22 million in funding. Tosca has directed several feature films for the platform including Alessandra Torre's Hollywood Dirt, Sylvia Day's Afterburn/Aftershock, Rachel van Dyken's The Matchmaker's Playbook, K. Bromberg's Driven, Jodi Ellen Malpas' The Protector, and Sylvain Reynard's Gabriel's Inferno series.

== Politics ==
Musk has "historically been a Democratic donor". In spite of this recent support (including the 2020 campaigns of Raphael Warnock and Jon Ossoff in Georgia), Musk has since attended inauguration parties for the second presidency of Donald Trump, which has included her being photographed with Robert F. Kennedy Jr.

When asked for comment regarding her brother's unprecedented influence on the second Trump administration, she first clarified that "It’s unfathomable to me to think that anybody would think such negative things about my family", in reference to public backlash surrounding her brother's stiff-armed salute/"my heart goes out to you" gesture, which some interpreted as a Nazi salute. She added that "I love my family dearly, and I will always be there and always support them, but sometimes their beliefs and their structures can be placed on me as if they’re the same as mine. And they aren't.".

== Awards and recognition ==
Awards
Year	Movie	Category	Result
2007	Simple Things	Governor's Golden Appy Award	Won
2007	Simple Things	Slate Award	Won
2007	Simple Things	IFFF 'Spirit' Award	Won
