= Gabriel's Inferno =

Novel by Sylvain Reynard

- First edition
- Author: Sylvain Reynard
- Genre: Romance
- Publisher: Omnific Publishing
- Publication date: 2009
- Pages: 506
- ISBN: 9780425265963
- OCLC: 9781936305629
- Followed by: Gabriel's Rapture

Gabriel's Inferno is an erotic romance novel by an anonymous Canadian author under the pen name Sylvain Reynard. The story was first published in novel format in 2011 by Omnific Publishing, with further publishing rights to the series being purchased by Berkley Books. The work was first published on 4 September 2012, along with the second book in the series, Gabriel's Rapture.

The series has been compared to Fifty Shades of Grey because both originated as Twilight fan fiction, with the International Business Times reporting that Gabriel's Inferno differs in that it bears "few similarities to the story that inspired it". The novel was originally published online as a Twilight fan fiction entitled The University of Edward Masen (Edward Masen being Edward Cullen's human name) under the pen name of Sebastien Robichaud. Gabriel's Inferno and its sequels appeared on The New York Times Best Seller list. A film adaptation was released on the streaming service Passionflix. The film was cut into three parts; the first part of the film was released on 29 May 2020.

== Plot ==
Gabriel Owen Emerson is a professor of Dante studies at the University of Toronto whose cold and aloof demeanor conceals a troubled past. His life begins to change when an intelligent graduate student in his seminar evokes a faint memory that may hold the key to a happiness he had long believed impossible.

Julianne Mitchell, a compassionate, kind young woman, is still struggling to overcome a childhood of neglect and abuse. When she enrolls at the University of Toronto, she knows she will see someone from her past – a man she met once, in an encounter she has never forgotten. Gabriel cannot recall what Julia knows: that they have a shared history rooted in an important moment of their lives.

The story unfolds around the electrifying connection between Gabriel and Julia and their increasingly passionate affair. Gabriel sees her unconditional love as his path to salvation even as he acknowledges his selfishness in doing so. Julia struggles with her own self-worth as she grows to trust Gabriel's feelings for her. Determined to capture the happiness that eluded them when they parted years ago, they must defy their own painful pasts as well as obstacles which now conspire to keep them apart.

== Development ==
When initially writing the novel, Reynard tried to "explore the themes of redemption and love with respect to two flawed people." The author also chose not to focus on the "mechanics of sex," viewing it as potentially detracting from the "mysterious and sometimes transcendent aspects of it." Reynard drew inspiration for the novel from the relationship between Dante and Beatrice Portinari.

Reynard has stated that the series was written as fanfiction as "an opportunity to try my hand at fiction writing."

== Reception ==
Fan reaction to the series has been positive, with some readers staging Inferno-inspired tours of Toronto. When Reynard chose to release the series for publication, some readers expressed disapproval over fanfiction being published for profit akin to the backlash Fifty Shades of Grey also received. As of October 2012, the book and its sequel were numbers 12 and 17 on The New York Times paperback trade fiction list.

== Further books ==
The second book in the series, Gabriel's Rapture, was released alongside Gabriel's Inferno on 4 September 2012. A third entry in the series, Gabriel's Redemption, was released on 3 December 2013. It also leads to a supernatural spin-off series centering a character introduced in Gabriel's Redemption, who is later revealed as a vampire known as The Prince, and his lover, Raven Wood, beginning with the novel The Raven. The author revealed on his Facebook page in November 2017 that he was currently writing the fourth novel in this series. The fourth novel, Gabriel's Promise, was released on January 7, 2020.

== Film adaptation ==
In November 2019, it was announced that filming for a Gabriel's Inferno movie had commenced in Syracuse, New York, with Melanie Zanetti and Giulio Berruti playing Julia and Gabriel and directed and produced by Tosca Musk. The film was released in 3 parts, the first part of Gabriel's Inferno premiered on Tosca's streaming service Passionflix on 29 May 2020; Part 2 was released on 31 July 2020. The last part was released on 19 November.

Filming for the sequel Gabriel's Rapture began in January until February 2020 but production had to be halted due to the COVID-19 pandemic. Principal production for Gabriel's Rapture resumed on 9 March 2021 in Florence; Italy, and completed in early June in Belize. During a live video chat on Instagram with producer & director Tosca Musk in March, she confirmed that like the first movie Gabriel's Inferno, the sequel will also be released in 3 parts due to the very long duration of the film. Part 1 of Gabriel's Rapture was released on 24 November 2021. Part 2 of Gabriel's Rapture was released on 24 March 2022. Part 3 was released on 12 August 2022.

Filming for the second sequel Gabriel's Redemption officially began in October 2022 and concluded in March 2023. On the 8 June Passionflix released the official trailer for part 1 of Gabriel's Redemption, confirming part 1 will be released on 22 June 2023. Part 2 of Gabriel's Redemption was released on 12 October 2023. Part 3 of Gabriel's Redemption and the final installment in the Gabriel's Inferno movie series, was released on 14 December 2023.

== See also ==
- Fifty Shades of Grey
- Beautiful Bastard
