= The Black Dagger Brotherhood =

2025 American TV series

- Genre: Romantic fantasy
- Created by: J. R. Ward
- Based on: Black Dagger Brotherhood by J. R. Ward
- Written by: Alys Murray; Tosca Musk
- Directed by: Tosca Musk
- Starring: Robert Maaser; Olivia Grace Applegate; Michael Roark; Joel Cederberg; Alexander Cubis; Sia Zami; Andrew Biernat; Zack Ignoffo; Victory Van Tuyl
- Country of origin: United States
- Original language: English
- No. of seasons: 2
- No. of episodes: 12

Production
- Production company: Passionflix

Original release
- Network: Passionflix
- Release: June 5, 2025 – present

The Black Dagger Brotherhood is an American paranormal romance television series based on the book series of the same name by J. R. Ward. Set in the fictional city of Caldwell, New York, the series follows a secret society of vampire warriors who protect their race from hidden enemies.

The series tells one ongoing story, with each season focusing on a different member of the Brotherhood. While a new central character and romance are introduced each season, everything stays connected to what happened before.

== Series overview ==
Season	Episodes	Originally released	
Season	Episodes	First released	Last released
1	6	June 5, 2025	July 10, 2025
2	6	October 29, 2026	December 3, 2026

== Synopsis ==
=== Season 1 ===
Wrath, the last purebred vampire and reluctant king of his race, is the leader of the Black Dagger Brotherhood, tasked with protecting vampires from growing threats. While navigating the responsibilities of his position, Wrath meets Beth Randall, a human journalist who discovers her vampire heritage after crossing paths with him. As she is drawn into the hidden vampire world under Wrath's protection, their relationship develops, influencing both their personal lives and the future of the Brotherhood.

=== Season 2 ===
Rhage is a powerful member of the Brotherhood burdened by a dangerous curse that manifests as an uncontrollable inner beast. His meeting with Mary Luce, a human woman who becomes connected to him under unexpected circumstances, challenges Rhage to confront his curse and his capacity for love.

== Cast and characters ==
=== Main ===
- Robert Maaser as Wrath
- Olivia Grace Applegate Beth Randall
- Michael Roark as Butch
- Joel Cederberg as Tohrment
- Alexander Cubis as Rhage
- Sia Zami as Vishous
- Andrew Biernat as Zsadist
- Zack Ignoffo as Phury
- Victory Van Tuyl as Marissa
- Audrey Hare as Mary Luce
- Bobby Hogan as John Matthew
- Mariah Davis as Bella

=== Recurring ===
- Gene David Paulsson as Fritz
- RJ Thomas as Billy Riddle
- Piotr Witkowski as Darius
- Ian Paola as José
- Kellen Boyle as Havers
- Darrell Snedeger as Mr. X
- Kim Whalen as Wellsie
- Jason Markoff as Mr. O

== Episodes ==
=== Season 1 (2025) ===
No.	Directed by	Original release date
1	Tosca Musk	June 6, 2025
Darius asks Wrath to help his half-human daughter Beth survive her impending transition into a vampire, but Wrath refuses due to his distrust of humans. The Brotherhood comes under attack from the Lessening Society, and Darius is killed. Beth meets Wrath shortly afterward, and he assumes responsibility for her protection as tensions escalate.
2	Tosca Musk	June 12, 2025
The Brotherhood begins searching for the Lessening Society's headquarters as their conflict intensifies. Meanwhile, Butch grows closer to Beth and expresses his feelings for her. Wrath reveals the truth about Beth's father and her vampire heritage, forcing her to confront the reality of her condition.
3	Tosca Musk	June 19, 2025
Wrath's past relationship with Marissa is revealed, creating tension around his personal life. Mr. X targets Billy Riddle as part of the Lessening Society's plans, while Butch becomes increasingly concerned for Beth's safety. Beth meets Tohrment, and a private dinner further deepens her connection with Wrath.
4	Tosca Musk	June 26, 2025
Rhage loses control of his inner beast, highlighting the dangers faced by the Brotherhood. Wrath begins to open up to Beth, while Mr. X punishes a lesser and recruits Billy Riddle. As Beth's transition begins, Butch brings her to Wrath, where he is introduced to the Brotherhood.
5	Tosca Musk	July 3, 2025
Beth survives her transition with Wrath's help, strengthening their bond. Preparations begin for a significant ceremony within the Brotherhood, while Wrath seeks guidance from the Scribe Virgin. Butch learns the truth about the vampire world, and Mr. X, along with the Omega, continues targeting Billy Riddle as part of their plan.
6	Tosca Musk	July 10, 2025
Wrath learns of a plot to kill him as the conflict with the Lessening Society reaches a climax. Mr. X kidnaps Beth, prompting Wrath to unite with the Brotherhood and Butch for a rescue mission.

=== Season 2 (2026) ===
No.	Directed by	Original release date
1	Tosca Musk	October 29, 2026
2	Tosca Musk	November 6, 2026
3	Tosca Musk	November 12, 2026
4	Tosca Musk	November 19, 2026
5	Tosca Musk	November 26, 2026
6	Tosca Musk	December 3, 2026

== Production and release ==
Over the years, Ward had been approached by various production studios interested in adapting her novels into television series or movies; however, she consistently declined, fearing that the final result might disappoint her readers. She eventually accepted an offer from Passionflix, a platform she knew produced faithful adaptations, which granted her veto power over casting, direction, and screenplays. The TV series, directed by Tosca Musk, was announced in September 2024 along with the cast. Ward serves as executive producer.

The first season was adapted from the novel Dark Lover, and filming started on October 14, 2024. A first trailer was released in March 2025, and a second one in May, ahead of its premiere on June 5, 2025 on Passionflix. It consisted of six episodes, which were released weekly on the platform.

The second season was announced in June 2025. Audrey Hare, Bobby Hogan and Mariah Davis were cast as Mary Luce, John Matthew and Bella, respectively, before production began in March 2026. The first scene filmed was Rhage and Mary's date at TGI Fridays from episode 2. Filming was over by the end of June. The teaser for the second season was released on September 28, 2026. Adapting the novel Lover Eternal, it premiered on October 29, 2026 on Passionflix.

Filming takes place in Georgia across Atlanta, Griffin and Senoia.

== Critical response ==
On the pilot episode, Sarabeth Pollock wrote "every detail of Ward's world has been recreated faithfully and in loving detail. It's a thrilling start to what's about to be a very long relationship." Markos Papadatos gave the first season 4 out of 5 stars, stating that it could be "a bit gratuitous at times, where viewers can recall Bridgerton meets Fifty Shades of Grey coupled with elements of The Matrix and The Vampire Diaries," but commended Musk's work.
