= The Will (2020 film) =

- Film poster
- Directed by: Louise Alston
- Written by: Joany Kane
- Based on: The Will by Kristen Ashley
- Produced by: Michael Buttiglieri
- Starring: Megan Dodds
- Cinematography: Jason Hargreaves
- Music by: Angela Little
- Production company: Passionflix
- Release date: February 14, 2020
- Country: United States
- Language: English

The Will is a 2020 American romance film. It was based on the 2014 novel of the same name by Kristen Ashley.

== Premise ==
Josie attends the funeral of her grandmother. She discovers she has been "left" in her grandmother's will to the enigmatic Jake.

== Cast ==
- Megan Dodds as Josephine "Josie" Malone
- Chris McKenna as Jake Spear
- Christian Hopper as Connor Spear
- Caroline Mixon as Amber Spear
- Trey Murphy as Ethan Spear
- Patrick Byas as Amond
- Martin Dingle-Wall as Henry Gagnon
- Billy Rick as Boston Stone
- Robin Spear as Alyssa
- David Anthony Buglione as Junior

== Production ==
Passionflix optioned the novel in 2017.
