= Joany Kane =

American screenwriter and novelist

Joany Kane is an American screenwriter from Massachusetts. She came up with the idea of the OTT streaming platform, Passionflix, got the URL, and in 2017, co-founded it with Tosca Musk and Jina Panebianco. She wrote her first screenplay in 1991. She also writes romance ebooks.

== Works ==
Screenplays

- The Christmas Card
- A Christmas Kiss
- Moonlight and Mistletoe
- The Will
- Christmas Magic

Books

- The Remote Seduction
- Operation Naughty
- The Memory Agent & Fool Me Once
- Miss Annie And The Chief
- A Villain's Kiss
- The Realm Warrior
