= Victory Van Tuyl =

American actress

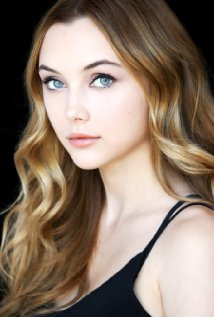
- Van Tuyl in 2014.
- Born: Atlanta, Georgia, U.S.
- Occupation: Actress
- Years active: 2008–present
- Height: 1.65 m (5 ft 5 in)

Victory Van Tuyl is an American actress. She starred in the Nickelodeon series Marvin Marvin and the independent film, Bedeviled, which had a theatrical release of August 11, 2017. In September 2024, Van Tuyl was announced as part of the cast for the television adaptation of J.R.Ward's bestselling paranormal romance series, The Black Dagger Brotherhood, in the role of Marissa.

== Early life ==
Van Tuyl was born in Atlanta, Georgia and grew up in Indian Hill, Ohio, a suburb of Cincinnati. At age 11, she moved back to Atlanta and began acting in community theatre, starring in several productions, including A Christmas Carol, Hansel and Gretel, Ramona Quimby and Will Rogers Follies. She signed with an agent and began traveling the Southeast, appearing in a number of independent films, such as Winter’s Tale, Magellan, and the lead role in Magic in the Forest.

== Career ==
In 2009 she appeared in the horror movie Zombieland. Van Tuyl and her family relocated to Los Angeles in 2011 to better pursue her acting career. Shortly after arriving she landed a recurring role as Julie on the Nickelodeon series Supah Ninjas. She also appeared in The Aquabats! Super Show!. Nickelodeon then offered her the part of Teri, one of the lead roles in the network's new series, Marvin Marvin. In it she starred alongside YouTube-sensation-turned-TV-star Lucas Cruikshank, who portrayed a space alien sent to live on Earth. Van Tuyl played his human sister who helped him navigate life as a typical American teenager. She starred in all twenty episodes of the entire Marvin Marvin series. She appeared in season 6 of the ABC series Castle, playing the role of Kris Howard in the episode "Smells like Teen Spirit." In 2014 she starred in the independent film The Stable Boy. Van Tuyl starred as Marissa in the Passionflix TV series The Black Dagger Brotherhood which was released on June 5, 2025.

== Awards ==
In 2013 Van Tuyl was nominated for a Young Artist Award in the category of Best Performance in a TV Series (Comedy or Drama) - Leading Young Actress for her performance in Marvin Marvin.

== Filmography ==
=== Cinema ===
Year	Title	Role
2008	Visitor	Monster-Girl
2008	Winter's Tale	Allison Clark
2009	Magellan	Ashley
2009	Zombieland	Bubby & Pee Paw's Granddaughter
2010	Magic in the Forest	Caty
2011	Demonica's Reign	Little Girl #5
2011	Anonymous	Kate
2014	The Stable Boy	Sophia
2016	Bedeviled	Haley Davis
2017	Honor Council	Mary Elizabeth

=== Television ===
Year	Title	Role	Notes
2011–2012	Supah Ninjas	Julie	5 episodes
2012	The Aquabats! Super Show!	Birthday Girl	Episode: "ManAnt!"
2012–2013	Marvin Marvin	Teri	19 episodes
2014	Castle	Kris Howard	Episode: "Smells like Teen Spirit"
2025–ongoing	The Black Dagger Brotherhood	Marissa	
