= Bedeviled (2016 film) =

- Theatrical release poster
- Directed by: The Vang Brothers
- Written by: The Vang Brothers
- Produced by: Cheng Yang; Leng Yang; Kirk Roos; The Vang Brothers
- Starring: Saxon Sharbino; Mitchell Edwards; Carson Boatman; Victory Van Tuyl; Brandon Soo Hoo; Jordan Essoe; Alexis G. Zall
- Cinematography: Jimmy Jung Lu
- Edited by: Cole Duran
- Music by: David C. Williams
- Production companies: Conduit; STANDOFF Pictures; Circle 18; Badlands Features
- Distributed by: Freestyle Digital Media
- Release dates: October 22, 2016 (Screamfest LA); August 11, 2017 (Digital HD)
- Running time: 98 minutes
- Country: United States
- Language: English

Bedeviled is a 2016 American supernatural horror film directed, written and produced by Abel Vang and Burlee Vang. Starring Saxon Sharbino, Mitchell Edwards, Victory Van Tuyl, Brandon Soo Hoo, Carson Boatman and Alexis G Zall. It follows a group of five friends who are haunted by a demonic entity after downloading a mysterious, Siri-like app that exploits their deepest fears to kill them.

The film was released on October 22, 2016, at Screamfest LA, and was released in select theaters and on Digital HD on August 11, 2017. It was overwelmgly panned by critics, "deeply dumb" teen thriller that failed to deliver scares, citing issues like poor acting, a nonsensical plot centered around an evil app, cheap special effects, unconvincing characters, and a reliance on tired horror clichés rather than innovative storytelling. Many critics found the film to be a missed opportunity, noting its potentially interesting concept was poorly executed and resulted in a boring and cheap-looking final product.

== Plot ==
The film opens with the death of Nikki, a young woman who recently downloaded Mr. Bedevil, a mysterious Siri-like A.I. app. She's stalked by a paranormal presence and is later found dead from a shock-induced heart attack. Following her funeral, Nikki's boyfriend, Cody, and best friend, Alice, along with Alice's boyfriend, Gavin, and friends, Haley and Dan, all receive invites to download Mr. Bedevil. They decide to download the app, which results in the group getting tormented by Mr. Bedevil and becoming haunted according to their personal fears. They also discover brands on their bodies in the shape of Mr. Bedevil’s app icon and eventually accept that the app is intent on killing them. Trying to destroy their phones will not stop Mr. Bedevil, as their phones will only get restored to their prior state.

The group tries to go to the police with their concerns after the app uploads a sex tape made by Haley and Dan, only for Mr. Bedevil to possess the police, making the application impossible to stop through normal means. As the tension mounts, the app tricks Gavin into coming to Alice's house, where he's murdered by clowns. The remaining friends manage to recover Nikki's phone, through which they discover that Nikki received an invite via Samuel Price, Nikki’s former physics tutor and pseudoscience enthusiast. Alice and Cody go to Sam's house, where they discover his body as well as audiotapes of Sam's research, which identify Mr. Bedevil as a paranormal presence that uses the app to enter reality in a manner similar to a Ouija board. Meanwhile, Haley and Dan are both murdered by Mr. Bedevil in ways that mimic their fears.

Cody discovers that it is possible to uninstall Mr. Bedevil from their phones by writing code that will accomplish this task. Because the app is capable of adapting and rewriting its firmware, Cody can only use his program when Mr. Bedevil enters the physical world by first connecting to the phone’s hardware. Alice and Cody set a trap for Mr. Bedevil at a warehouse using two separate computer stations. They manage to successfully uninstall Mr. Bedevil from Alice's phone but are unable to do the same for Cody's phone, as the second computer station's uninstall program fails to penetrate the additional security on his phone, resulting in Cody's death. The film ends with Alice attending college and FaceTiming her mother, only to discover that she is now using the Mr. Bedevil app herself.

== Cast ==
- Saxon Sharbino as Alice
- Mitchell Edwards as Cody
- Brandon Soo Hoo as Dan
- Victory Van Tuyl as Haley
- Carson Boatman as Gavin
- Jordan Essoe as Mr. Bedevil
- Alexis G. Zall as Nikki
- Robyn Cohen as Alice's Mom
- Kate Orsini as Nikki's Mom
- Bonnie Morgan as Grandmother
- Aaron Hendry as Mr. DiFilipo
- Linda Barrett as Lady on Bus
- Doug Scarbrough as Homeless Man
- Robert John Brewer as Voice of Homeless Man
- Shannon Sinclear as Bedeviled Lady
- Belle Vang as Young Dan / Young Haley
- Carr Carzouapa Lee as Drowned Woman
- Kevin Cheng Vang as Haley's Father
- Cole Duran as Teddy Bear Voice
- Brett Wagner as Fat Clown
- Camden Toy as Tall Clown
- Angelina Armani as Maid Clown
- Michael Shen as Detective
- Billy Mayo as Cop
- Matty Finochio as Samuel Price

== Reception ==
Bloody Disgusting rated Bedeviled three and a half out of a possible five stars, stating that "What we have here is a charming, albeit occasionally predictable, character-driven horror movie with a splash of modern sensibilities." On Rotten Tomatoes, the film has a 0% Tomatometer rating based on 5 reviews with reviewers critiquing the film's overreliance on clichés.
