= Inspiration, Please! =

American game show

Inspiration, Please! is an American game show that aired on the Odyssey Channel (now the Hallmark Channel) from October 1, 1995, until 1998. The show was created by Donald Epstein, who also served as the show's announcer. Robert G. Lee hosted. The show was produced by Trinity Productions at the Trinity TV Studios at Trinity Church at the corner of Broadway and Wall Street in New York City.

== Gameplay ==
Three players competed daily.

=== Round one ===
In round one, host Lee asked the contestants trivia questions on subjects and areas ranging from Bible trivia to art and zoology. The first player to buzz in with the correct answer earned 10 points and a chance at a bonus question on the same subject for an additional 10 points.

=== Round two ===
Round two was played the same way as round one, but with point values doubled, meaning that questions were worth 20 points.

=== Round three ===
In round three, all correct answers to questions were worth 30 points. The first letter of each answer was a letter in that day's "Inspiration Word" (the number of letters varied per episode). Giving correct answers allowed players to solve the word. Solving the word scored an additional 100 points and ended the game.

The player with the most points won the game, received prizes, and returned for further rounds in an elimination tournament, whose eventual winner won the grand prize trip for two to the Holy Land.
