= Marvin Marvin =

American TV series

- Genre: Comedy science fiction; Slapstick
- Created by: Jon Ross; Jeff Bushell
- Starring: Lucas Cruikshank; Mim Drew; Victory Van Tuyl; Jacob Bertrand; Camille Spirlin; Pat Finn; Casey Sander
- Composer: Kenneth Burgomaster
- Country of origin: United States
- Original language: English
- No. of seasons: 1
- No. of episodes: 19

Production
- Executive producers: Jon Ross; Jeff Bushell; Evan Weiss; Gary Binkow
- Producers: Richard G. King (Note: Episode 1); Patty Gary-Cox
- Running time: 23 minutes, one 45-minute special
- Production companies: The Collective; Nickelodeon Productions

Original release
- Network: Nickelodeon
- Release: November 24, 2012 – April 27, 2013

Marvin Marvin is an American science fiction comedy television series that aired on Nickelodeon from November 24, 2012, to April 27, 2013. The series stars Lucas Cruikshank of Fred fame as the titular character Marvin Forman, an alien teenage boy adjusting to human life. The series ended after one season due to Cruikshank's contract with Nickelodeon expiring.

== Premise ==
Set in Portland, Oregon, Marvin Marvin follows the adventures of a teenage alien with special powers named Marvin (Lucas Cruikshank) who was sent to Earth by his parents in order to protect him from evil invaders on his home planet, Klooton. Under the supervision of his new human parents, Bob (Pat Finn) and Liz (Mim Drew), Marvin tries to adjust to life on Earth as a typical American teenager. Helping him navigate Earth's unfamiliar social customs are Marvin's human siblings Teri (Victory Van Tuyl) and Henry (Jacob Bertrand) and his mischievous grandfather, Pop-Pop (Casey Sander). As if teaching Marvin how to act human was not hard enough, the family and even Teri's curious best friend, Briana (Camille Spirlin), must also conceal his real identity from the world.

== Cast ==
=== Main ===
- Lucas Cruikshank as Marvin Forman, a "teenage" alien from the planet Klooton who is revealed to actually be 580 years old in "Pilot" and hides his true alien form behind his human form. His powers include the ability to freeze and heat objects at will using his fingers. He is also able to talk to animals, shapeshift, float, and calm people down using the "Klootonian Calm Palm". In the pilot, he adopts the name Marvin Marvin because he knew Teri did not want him to have the same last name as her. He nervously repeated his first name Marvin as his last name.
- Mim Drew as Elizabeth "Liz" Forman, the family's mother and human "mother" of Marvin. She treats Marvin like her own children and really cares for him.
- Victory Van Tuyl as Teri Forman, the older sister of Henry and the younger human sister of Marvin.
- Jacob Bertrand as Henry Forman, Teri and Marvin's younger brother; he turns 10 in the episode "Burger on a Bun". He is very mischievous and cunning with plans of secret parties, playing hooky, going to a nude beach on a family vacation, etc.
- Camille Spirlin as Brianna, Teri's very loyal best friend. She finds out about Marvin's secret in "Space-Cation".
- Pat Finn as Robert "Bob" Forman, the family's father and human "father" of Marvin.
- Casey Sander as George "Pop-Pop", Teri and Henry's grandfather, Marvin's human "grandfather," and the father of Liz. He is very childish and mischievous like his grandson Henry.

=== Recurring ===
- Angel Amaral as Ben, Marvin's human best friend. He is stereotypically nerdy and is not very popular. He quickly makes friends with Marvin when he sees that Marvin is not making friends easily. Ben is also known to have a huge comic book collection.
- Dennis Atlas as Derek Winfeld, a school kid who believes he is a horse. He grows his hair long and wears brown as he gallops through the school whinnying.

== Episodes ==
No.	Title	Directed by	Written by	Original release date	Prod. code	U.S. viewers (millions)
1	"Pilot"	Gary Halvorson	Jon Ross and Jeff Bushell	November 24, 2012	101	2.61
Marvin wants to go to school, but Bob and Liz won't let him. Telling Bob and Liz that Marvin is upstairs shedding his skin, Henry then sneaks Marvin to school without them knowing. Meanwhile, Teri is running for student council against a super hot football player named Cliff Drill, and she has no one voting for her. Teri tells Marvin to pretend he isn't related to her. Teri then realizes that Cliff is stealing her posters, but she has no witness except a mime. Teri and her friend Brianna look for ways to win the election while Marvin tries to adjust to school, but keeps messing up (Releasing the animals from the science lab after they tell him they want to be released, dancing to ringtones whenever a phone rings.) When Marvin catches Cliff stealing Teri's posters, Cliff gets mad. Teri plays music, and Marvin starts dancing, luckily dodging Cliff's punches in the process, until finally the football player lands in the trash can. Brianna tells everyone Teri knows Marvin, and they all say they'll vote for Teri. Marvin returns home where Bob and Liz scold him when they realized he wasn't shedding after all and was at school. After Teri tells them she will keep an eye on Marvin, they agree to let him go to school, but ground him and Henry.
2	"Improbable Story"	Eric Dean Seaton	Carly Althoff & Luke Giordano	December 1, 2012	105	2.07
Marvin's ability to talk to horses inspires a plan from Grandpa to help him win big at the track. Meanwhile, Teri and Brianna come up with two inventions, The "Hairbandit", and "StickyBuds".
3	"Toothache"	Gary Halvorson	Dicky Murphy	December 8, 2012	103	2.25
Marvin "fends for himself" and eats a huge amount of chocolate when a family meal is called off, and soon he develops an explosive toothache; Henry wins a chocolate selling contest and wins a motorbike.
4	"Ice Pop Pop"	Eric Dean Seaton	Jennifer Joyce	December 15, 2012	106	2.94
Marvin learns what an expiration date is, and he thinks that Pop-Pop will expire when he sees his driver's license. The day before Pop-Pop was supposed to "expire," he says that the bacon is going to expire in one day so Bob tells him to freeze the bacon to keep it fresh. So he freezes Pop-Pop. Marvin, Henry, Liz and Bob soon discovered that Pop-Pop was tricking Marvin so he can get whatever he wants. Upon unfreezing him, it is unveiled that Marvin tried to make a device to make Pop-Pop young again. But it backfired so he is now an elderly. He was about to die, so he asks Pop-Pop to make him a smoothie as his last wish. It is revealed that he only set his cloaking device to "Old Fart". Meanwhile, Teri and Briana plot revenge on a boy who has asked them both on a date only to find out that the boy is actually a twin.
5	"Burger On a Bun"	Eric Dean Seaton	Steve Leff	January 5, 2013	108	2.88
After seeing a bicycle with training wheels on them, Marvin asks for more money, so Liz says to Marvin that Teri has a job at Burger on a Bun. He goes in for the job, but takes it too seriously. That only got him to Assistant Manager. Taking the job too hard, he fired Teri. Burger on a Bun went downhill in quality, so Briana quit when Marvin kept on taking it seriously. This caused him to make the burgers in his own way. After people started leaving, Marvin quit. But he spent all the money he made on Katy Perry tickets for Teri. Meanwhile, Pop-Pop and Henry find a suitcase Bill Gates lost 20 years ago and try to open it, only to find the suitcase itself is valuable.
6	"Marvin and the Cool Kids"	Eric Dean Seaton	Peter Dirksen & Jonathan Howard	January 12, 2013	107	2.11
Marvin begins to spend time with the popular kids at school and gets the cool reputation, but his new popular friends make him take the risk of breaking the rules and forgetting his best friend. Meanwhile, Teri obsesses over the unknown writer of the notebook she found at school. Teri meets a guy who she thinks is the owner but all he says is "Will you make out with me?"
7	"Scary Movie"	Rob Schiller	Peter Dirksen & Jonathan Howard	January 19, 2013	109	2.30
When Liz forbids Marvin and Henry from seeing a scary movie, they disobey her and watch it anyway. After seeing it, the horrors from the movie come to life. Meanwhile, Teri tries to impress a boy by "accidentally" pocket dialing him and pretending to do exciting things.
8	"Double Date"	Gary Halvorson	Jeff Bushell	January 26, 2013	102	2.39
Marvin and Teri go on a double date. After Marvin takes a picture of him and his date, Liz, Henry and Pop-Pop think that the waiter is a Klerg. Guest Star: Noah Centineo as Blaine Hotman
9	"Basketball"	Shannon Flynn	Jon Ross	February 2, 2013	104	2.31
When Marvin wants to try and pick a sports team to be active, he picks basketball and soon discovers he has the gift and talent of playing it.
10	"Space-Cation"	Rob Schiller	Jeff Bushell	February 9, 2013	110	2.33
When Marvin sends the Forman family to an unknown planet by mistake, he must tell Brianna that he is an alien in order to save them. In the end, it turns out that the family was still on Earth.
11	"Battle of the Bands"	Shannon Flynn	Dicky Murphy	February 16, 2013	112	1.83
Marvin needs a band to perform in "Battle of the Bands", so he uses a group of second graders. Meanwhile, the Forman family has a chili cook off and the loser has to eat the winner's chili from Marvin's shoe.
12	"Marvin Gets a Pet"	Shannon Flynn	Jennifer Joyce	February 23, 2013	113	2.01
Marvin finds a Klootonian Fuzzy egg and tries to raise it as a pet against Liz and Bob's wishes. Meanwhile, Teri tries to make everything perfect when meeting a U.S. senator.
13	"Calm Palm"	Eric Dean Seaton	Marc Warren & Danny Warren and Jeff Bushell	March 2, 2013	111	1.94
Marvin uses a Calm Palm on Teri when she's over stressed about a fencing competition. Meanwhile, Henry and Pop-Pop want to play hockey in the house, but Bob and Liz want them to follow the house rules.
14	"St. Glar Kai Day"	Shannon Flynn	Jon Ross	March 16, 2013	116	1.72
Marvin and the Forman family celebrate St. Glar Kai Day, but they also have to deal with federal agents who discover alien activity in their house.
15	"The Amazing Comic Book Thief"	Eric Dean Seaton	Blake J. Williger	March 30, 2013	117	1.80
Marvin accidentally steals one of Ben's precious comic books, and he must return it before Ben finds out. Meanwhile, Teri and Brianna think that Liz is reading Teri's phone text's.
16	"Marvin's Day Off"	Eric Dean Seaton	Steve Leff	April 6, 2013	118	1.80
Marvin joins a book club to spend time with his new crush;Marvin becomes sick the day of a book club meeting and plays hooky from school, however later sneaking into school and vomits on his crush. Meanwhile, Teri lets Brianna share her locker after a crime scene was done near her locker.
17	"House Party"	Jeff Bushell	Zach Butler	April 13, 2013	120	1.92
Marvin watches a bunch of Teen Party movies, and plans a party against Teri's wishes. Meanwhile, Liz, Bob, Pop Pop, and Henry fight a snowstorm to get to Henry's skating tournament.
18	"Mr. Earth"	Alex Winter	Peter Dirksen & Jonathan Howard	April 20, 2013	119	2.13
Marvin's Klootonian uncle, Uncle Steve, visits the Formans. He says that Marvin is more Earthling than Klootonian and tries to take Marvin back to Klooton. Then Uncle Steve sees that Marvin taught the Formans about Klooton and lets Marvin stay on Earth.
19	"Big Time Marvin"	Jonathan Judge	Carly Althoff & Luke Giordano	April 27, 2013	999-60	2.18
Marvin and Teri go to a Big Time Rush concert, but Big Time Rush got kidnapped by the Klerg, and so did Teri, after being mistaken for a Klootonian. Now it's up to Marvin to save them.

== Accolades ==
Year	Award	Category	Recipient	Result	Ref.
2013	Nickelodeon Kids' Choice Awards	Favorite TV Actor	Lucas Cruikshank	Nominated	
2013	Young Artist Award	Best Performance in a TV Series - Leading Young Actress	Victory Van Tuyl	Nominated	

== Broadcast ==
The series originally aired on Nickelodeon in the United States on November 24, 2012, and on YTV in Canada on March 19, 2013.

== Reception ==
Marvin Marvin received mostly negative reviews. Common Sense Media gave the show 2 out of 5 stars stating, "The show's best feature is the care it takes to reminding viewers that it's important to be yourself, even when that makes you different from your peers. From a kid's point, however, this message is lost amid Marvin's outrageous predicaments." Media Life Magazine stated, "Marvin Marvin is simply bland, bland," while Brian Lowry of Variety called the sitcom a "teeth-gnashing affair" and its gags "stale".

The series premiere scored 2.6 million viewers after a brand new Victorious. The next episode that premiered had 2.1 million viewers. The most watched episodes are "Ice Pop Pop" and "Burger on a Bun" with 2.9 million viewers, and the least watched episode is "St. Glar Kai Day" with 1.7 million viewers.

== See also ==
- Fred Figglehorn
