= Vi Keeland =

American novelist

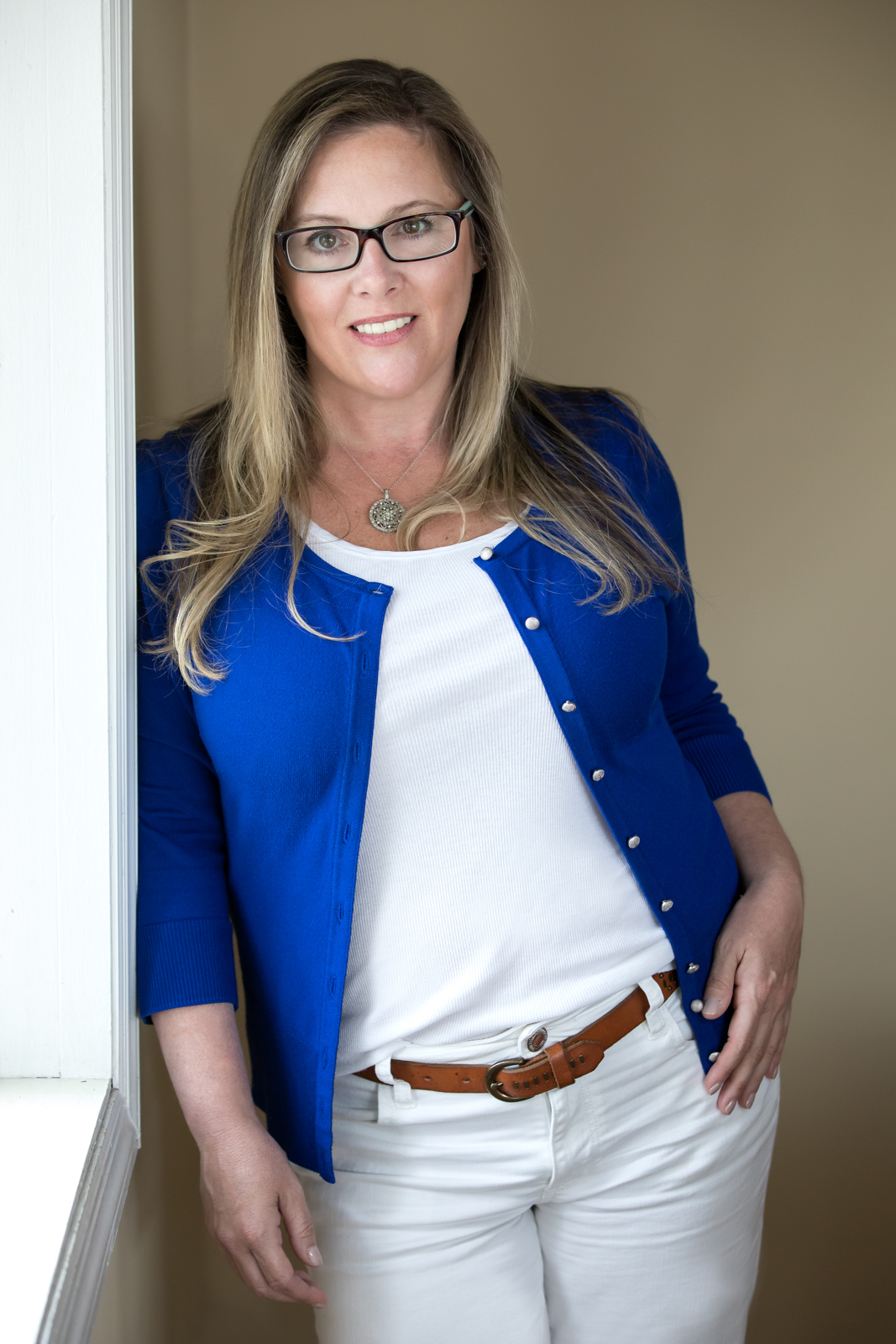
- Vi Keeland at home in New York in 2020
- Citizenship: United States
- Writing career
- Language: English
- Years active: 2013–present
- Genre: Romance novels
- Website: vikeeland.com

Vi Keeland is an American author associated with Montlake Romance. Her books have become bestsellers on New York Times and USA Today listings, have been translated worldwide, and have appeared on the German, Brazilian, and US bestseller lists. Fourteen of her novels have appeared on the New York Times bestseller list, and Bossman placed at #1 on both The New York Times and Wall Street Journal bestseller lists. Her short stories, Dry Spell, The Merry Mistake, and Scrooged were turned into movies by Passionflix. and her full-length novel, Egomaniac, is currently optioned for film by TaleFlick.

== Writing career ==
In January 2013, Keeland published her first novel First Thing I See. Though she never intended on publishing it, she was inspired to take a chance after being displaced from her home due to damage from Hurricane Sandy. Since then, she has published thirty-one full-length novels, and her work is translated in twenty-seven languages and available as animated games. She is represented by Kimberly Brower of Brower Literary & Management.

In 2016 Keeland published Bossman, a book about a boss who falls for one of his employees. The book debuted at #1 on The New York Times and the Wall Street Journal bestseller lists and spent 6 weeks on the USA Today bestseller list. In 2021, Keeland published The Invitation, a book about a woman who crashes a wedding only to be caught by a handsome groomsman. The book debuted at #1 on the Wall Street Journal bestseller list and spent 6 weeks on the USA Today bestseller list.

Keeland has been collaborating with Penelope Ward on a number of contemporary romance novels. The first of which, Cocky Bastard (2015), was about a cross-country driver who gets in a romance with a guy who fixed her flat tire. The book was listed on USA Today and New York Times bestsellers. The title of the book started a trend among romance novelists to include the word "cocky" in their titles.

Three of her short stories have been adapted into films by Passionflix, and her full-length novel, Egomaniac, is currently optioned for film by TaleFlick.

== Personal life and career ==
Keeland is married to a man whom she has known since they were in grade school. They have three children and live in Long Island. Before writing, Vi Keeland was an attorney and specialized in the area of tax law. Vi’s husband is a guitar player who is locally known for his cover of “Wagon Wheel”.

== Accolades ==
Year	Award	Book	Category	Result	Reference
2021	Audie Awards	Dirty Letters	Romance	Won	
2017	Audie Awards	The Baller	Erotica	Nominated	
2017	Australian Romance Readers Awards	Egomaniac	Erotic Romance	Won	
2016	Goodreads Choice Awards	Stuck-Up Suit	Romance	Nominated	
2017	Goodreads Choice Awards	Egomaniac	Romance	Nominated	
2018	Goodreads Choice Awards	Sex, Not Love	Romance	Nominated	
2021	New York Public Library Best Books of 2021	The Invitation		Listed	

Amazon Annual Top Sellers Stuck-Up Suit(#53) Bossman(#59) Hate Notes(#37)

Amazon Most Unputdownable Book of the Year Hate Notes(#1)

== Works ==
=== Novels ===
- First Thing I See (2013)
- Belong to You (2013) – Cole series #1
- Made for You (2013) – Cole series #2
- Worth the Fight (2013)* – MMA fighter series #1
- Worth the Chance (2014) – MMA fighter series #2
- Worth Forgiving (2014) – MMA fighter series #3
- Left Behind with Dylan Scott (2014)
- Throb (2015) – Life on stage series #1
- Beat (2015) – Life on stage series #2
- The Baller (2016)*
- Bossman (2016)*
- Egomaniac (2017)*
- Beautiful Mistake (Diversion Books, 2017)
- Sex, Not Love (2018)*
- The Naked Truth (2018)*
- We Shouldn't (2019)*
- All Grown Up (2019)*
- The Rivals (2020)*
- Inappropriate (2020)*
- The Invitation (2020)*
- The Spark (2021)*

=== Novels co-written with Penelope Ward ===
- Cocky Bastard (2015)*
- Stuck-Up Suit (2016)*
- Playboy Pilot (2016)*
- Mister Moneybags (2017)*
- Hate Notes (2018)
- British Bedmate (2018)
- Rebel Heir (2018)*
- Rebel Heart (2018)*
- Dirty Letters (2019)
- Park Avenue Player (2019)
- My Favorite Souvenir (2020)
- Happily Letter After (2020)
- Not Pretending Anymore (2021)
- denotes New York Times, USA Today and/or Wall Street Journal bestsellers

=== Other works ===
- Dry Spell (2018) – short story
