= Jessica Bird =

American novelist (born 1969)

Jessica Rowley Pell Bird Blakemore
- Born: Jessica Rowley Pell Bird; Boston, Massachusetts, U.S.
- Education: Smith College; Albany Law School (JD)
- Occupation: Novelist
- Spouse: John Neville Blakemore III (2001–present)
- Writing career
- Pen name: J. R. Ward
- Language: English
- Period: 2002–present
- Genres: Romance, paranormal romance
- Notable works: From the First, Black Dagger Brotherhood series
- Notable awards: RITA award – Short Contemporary Romance; 2007 From the First; RITA award – Paranormal Romance; 2008 Lover Revealed; RITA award – Paranormal Romance; 2019 Dearest Ivie
- Website: www.jessicabird.com

Jessica Bird is an American novelist. She writes contemporary romance novels under the name Jessica Bird and paranormal romance under the pen name J. R. Ward. She is a three-time winner of the Romance Writers of America RITA Award, once as Jessica Bird for From the First, and twice as J. R. Ward for Lover Revealed and Dearest Ivie. Her books have appeared on The New York Times Best Seller list. According to Louisville Magazine, her books have been published in 25 countries and in several different languages, with over 16 million copies reported in print. The same article notes that her works have been bestsellers in the United States, Germany, the United Kingdom, and several South American countries.

== Early life and education ==
Jessica Rowley Pell Bird was born in Massachusetts to W. Gillette Bird Jr. and Maxine F. Bird. She developed an interest in writing at an early age, reportedly completing her first story at the age of eight and writing her first romance book the summer before she attended college. She has described becoming interested in romance fiction at the age of thirteen.

Bird attended Smith College, where she majored in history and art history with a concentration in medieval studies. According to a 2013 profile in Kentucky Monthly, Bird was then encouraged by her mother to pursue publication of her writing. However, instead of immediately pursuing a writing career, Bird chose to earn a Juris Doctor degree from Albany Law School. After law school, Bird, who is licensed to practice law in two states, began working in healthcare administration in Boston, where she spent several years as Chief of Staff at a major academic medical center.

== Personal life ==
In 2001, Bird married John Neville Blakemore III. The couple relocated from Boston to Louisville, Kentucky, where Bird has since made her home.

== Career ==
Bird has mentioned in interviews that her husband discovered some of her early writing and helped her gain an introduction to a literary agent. The following year, her first novel, Leaping Hearts, a contemporary romance, was published. After publishing several books that did not sell strongly, she was released from her publishing contract.

A longtime fan of Stephen King, Bird discovered paranormal romance while browsing in a bookstore. Inspired by the genre, she created a fictional universe centered on vampires and began writing standalone paranormal romance novels under the pen name J. R. Ward. These novels comprise the Black Dagger Brotherhood series. The series was later adapted into a mini-series by Passionflix and released in June 2025.

In describing her writing style, Bird says the stories are presented “in short clips, similar to movies, as though she is witnessing their lives firsthand.” She then “puts these bites into chronological order and decides which point of view is the best way to let the book unfold”. She has stated that she prefers writing series in which characters from earlier books reappear, likening the process to “meeting friends through other friends".

In a 2004 interview, Bird described her preference for writing "alpha males," stating, "The tougher, the cockier, the more arrogant, the better." She explained that she is drawn to such characters because she "respect[s] strength and intelligence." She also noted she likes her heroines "to be very smart" and "strong enough to triumph over the obstacles that are placed before them," and emphasized that they "have to be intelligent and know what they want."

== Published works ==
Pen Name	Series / Stand‑alone	Title	Year Published	Notes
Jessica Bird	Stand-alone novels	Leaping Hearts	2002	Ivy Books. July 2002. ISBN 978-0-8041-1988-7.
		Heart of Gold	2003	Ivy Books. June 2003. ISBN 978-0-8041-1989-4.
		An Unforgettable Lady	2004	Ivy Books. March 2004. ISBN 978-0-345-45895-7.
		An Irresistible Bachelor	2004	Ivy Books. March 2004. ISBN 978-0-345-45896-4.
	Moorehouse Legacy	Beauty and the Black Sheep / The Rebel	2005	Silhouette. July 2005. ISBN 978-0-373-24698-4.
		His Comfort and Joy / The Player	2006	Silhouette. January 2006. ISBN 978-0-373-24732-5.
		From the First / The Renegade	2006	Silhouette. April 2006. ISBN 978-0-373-24750-9.
		A Man in a Million / The Rogue	2007	Silhouette. January 2007. ISBN 978-0-373-24803-2.
	The O’Banyon Brothers	The Billionaire Next Door	2007	Silhouette. August 2007. ISBN 978-0-373-24844-5.
	Omnibus / Collaborations	Plain Jane’s Secret Life / Beauty and the Black Sheep (with Cathy Gillen Thacker)	2005	Harlequin Mills & Boon. September 2005. ISBN 978-0-7335-6219-8.
		From the First / What Are Friends For? (with Patricia Kay)	2006	Harlequin Mills & Boon. June 2006. ISBN 978-0-7335-6904-3.
		Mistress: Taken by the Tycoon (includes The Billionaire Next Door)	2010	Mira. January 2010. ISBN 978-0-263-87701-4.
Jessica Ward	Stand-alone novel	The St. Ambrose School for Girls	2023	Gallery Books. July 2023. ISBN 978-1-9821-9486-4.
J.R. Ward	Black Dagger Brotherhood	Dark Lover	2005	Penguin. September 2005. ISBN 978-0-451-21695-3.
		Lover Eternal	2006	Signet. March 2006. ISBN 978-0-451-21804-9.
		Lover Awakened	2006	Signet. September 2006. ISBN 978-0-451-21936-7.
		Lover Revealed	2007	Onyx. March 2007. ISBN 978-0-451-41235-5.
		Lover Unbound	2007	Signet. September 2007. ISBN 978-0-451-22235-0.
		Lover Enshrined	2008	Signet. June 2008. ISBN 978-0-451-22272-5.
		Father Mine: Zsadist and Bella's Story: A Black Dagger Brotherhood Novella	2008	Berkley. October 2008. ISBN 978-1-4406-4161-9. (ebook)
		Lover Avenged	2009	NAL. April 2009. ISBN 978-0-451-22585-6.
		Lover Mine	2010	NAL. May 2010. ISBN 978-0-451-22985-4.
		Lover Unleashed	2011	NAL. March 2011. ISBN 978-0-451-23316-5.
		Lover Reborn	2012	NAL. March 2012. ISBN 978-0-451-23584-8.
		Lover at Last	2013	NAL. March 2013. ISBN 978-0-451-23935-8.
		The King	2014	NAL. April 2014. ISBN 978-0-451-41705-3.
		The Shadows	2015	NAL. March 2015. ISBN 978-0-451-41707-7.
		The Beast	2016	NAL. April 2016. ISBN 978-0-451-47516-9.
		The Chosen	2017	Ballantine Books. April 2017. ISBN 978-0-451-47519-0.
		Dearest Ivie: A Novella Set in the Black Dagger World	2018	Ballantine Books. March 2018. ISBN 978-0-525-62092-1. (ebook)
		The Thief	2018	Ballantine Books. April 2018. ISBN 9780451475213.
		Prisoner of Night (novella)	2019	Gallery Books. January 2019. ISBN 978-1-5011-9517-4.
		The Savior	2019	Gallery Books. April 2019. ISBN 978-1-5011-9494-8.
		Where Winter Finds You: A Caldwell Christmas (holiday novella)	2019	Pocket Books. November 2019. ISBN 978-1-9821-3547-8.
		The Sinner	2020	Gallery Books. March 2020. ISBN 978-1-5011-9509-9.
		A Warm Heart in Winter: A Caldwell Christmas (holiday novella)	2020	Pocket Books. December 2020. ISBN 978-1-9821-5970-2.
		Lover Unveiled	2021	Gallery Books. April 20, 2021. ISBN 978-1-5011-9512-9.
		Lover Arisen	2022	Gallery Books. April 2022. ISBN 978-1-9821-7999-1.
		Lassiter	2023	Gallery Books. April 2023. ISBN 978-1-9821-8006-5.
		Darius	2023	Gallery Book. September 2023. ISBN 978-1-6680-3538-2.
		The Beloved	2024	Gallery Books. April 2024. ISBN 978-1-9821-8008-9.
		Lover Forbidden	2025	Gallery Books. September 2025. ISBN 978-1-9821-7996-0.
		Lover Enthroned	2026	Gallery Books. September 2026.
		Havoc	2027	Gallery Books. 2027.
		Wrath	2028	Gallery Books. 2028.
		The Scribe Virgin	2029	Gallery Books. 2029.
	Black Dagger Legacy	Blood Kiss	2015	Signet. December 2015. ISBN 978-0-451-47532-9.
		Blood Vow	2016	Ballantine Books. December 2016. ISBN 978-0-451-47533-6.
		Blood Fury	2018	Ballantine Books. January 2018. ISBN 978-0-451-47534-3.
		Blood Truth	2019	Gallery Books. August 2019. ISBN 978-1-9821-3171-5.
	Black Dagger: Prison Camp	The Jackal	2020	Gallery Books. August 2020. ISBN 978-1-5011-9508-2.
		The Wolf	2021	Gallery Books. November 2021. ISBN 978-1-9821-7987-8.
		The Viper	2022	Gallery Books. September 2022. ISBN 978-1-9821-7990-8.
		A Bloom in Winter (holiday novella)	2024	Gallery Books. November 2024. ISBN 978-1-9821-8028-7.
	Lost Dagger Society	Brother of Fire	TBA	
	The Bourbon Kings	The Bourbon Kings	2015	Berkley. July 2015. ISBN 978-0-451-47526-8.
		The Angel's Share	2016	Berkley. July 2016. ISBN 978-0-451-47528-2.
		Devil's Cut	2017	Ballantine Books. August 2017. ISBN 978-0-451-47530-5.
	Fallen Angels Series	Covet	2009	Signet. September 2009. ISBN 978-0-451-22821-5.
		Crave	2010	Signet. October 2010. ISBN 978-0-451-22944-1.
		Envy	2011	Signet. September 2011. ISBN 978-0-349-40020-4.
		Rapture	2012	NAL. September 2012. ISBN 978-0-7499-5700-1.
		Possession	2013	NAL. October 2013. ISBN 978-0-451-24019-4.
		Immortal	2014	NAL. October 2014. ISBN 978-0-451-24116-0.
	Firefighter Series	The Wedding from Hell (3-Part prequel)	2018	Gallery Books. August 2018. ISBN 978-1-9821-0624-9.
		Consumed	2018	Gallery Books. October 2018. ISBN 978-1-5011-9490-0.
	The Kingdoms of the Compass	Crown of War and Shadow	2026	Bramble. February 2026. ISBN ISBN 978-1-250-37363-2.
		Throne of Frost and Flame	2027	Bramble. April 2027.
	Lair of the Wolven	Claimed	2021	Pocket Books. June 29, 2021. ISBN 978-1-9821-5037-2.
		Forever	2023	Pocket Books. March 28, 2023. ISBN 978-1-9821-8020-1.
		Mine	2024	Pocket Books. January 2024. ISBN 978-0-349-43066-9.
	Collaborative / Anthology Contributions / Stand-alone Novellas	The Story of Son: A Story of Dark Vampire Romance (Dead After Dark with Sherrilyn Kenyon, Susan Squires, Dianna Love)	2008	St. Martin's Paperbacks. December 2008. ISBN 978-1-4668-6783-3.
		Dark Lover (Boxset with MaryJanice Davidson, Christine Feehan)	2010	NAL. January 2010. ISBN 978-0-425-23619-2.
		Lover Awakened (Boxset with MaryJanice Davidson, Laurell K Hamilton, Charlaine Harris, Katie MacAlister)	2010	Signet. January 2010. ISBN 978-0-451-94815-1.
	Supplemental	The Black Dagger Brotherhood: 20th Anniversary Insider's Guide	2025	Blue Box Press. December 2025. ISBN 978-1-963135-79-4.
		The Black Dagger Brotherhood: An Insider's Guide	2008	NAL. October 2008. ISBN 978-0-451-22500-9.

== Filmography ==
Title	Year	Type	Role	Notes
The Black Dagger Brotherhood	2025 - present	TV Mini-Series	Author, Writer, Executive Producer	Adapted by Passionflix; released June 2025.
The Bourbon Kings	TBA	TV Movie	Author, Writer	In production.

== Awards and reception ==
Awards for Jessica Bird
Year	Nominated work	Category	Award	Result	Notes	Ref.
2006	Lover Awakened	Best Vampire Romance	RT Book Reviews Reviewers’ Choice Award	Won		
2006	Lover Unbound	Best Vampire Romance	RT Book Reviews Reviewers’ Choice Award	Won		
2007	From the First	Best Short Contemporary Romance	Romance Writers of America RITA Award	Won		
2008	Lover Enshrined	Best Vampire Romance	P.E.A.R.L. (Paranormal Excellence Award for Romantic Literature)	Won		
2008	Lover Revealed	Paranormal Romance	Romance Writers of America RITA Award	Won		
2009	Lover Avenged	Best Overall Paranormal Romance and Best Vampire Romance	P.E.A.R.L. (Paranormal Excellence Award for Romantic Literature)	Won		
2010	Lover Mine	Best Romance	Goodreads Choice Award	Won		
2011	Lover Unleashed	Best Romance	Goodreads Choice Award	Won		
2011	Lover Unleashed	Best Vampire Romance	RT Book Reviews Reviewers’ Choice Award	Won		
2013	Lover at Last	Best Romance	Goodreads Choice Award	Won		
2019	Dearest Ivie	Paranormal Romance	Romance Writers of America RITA Award	Won		

Ward has also appeared on The New York Times Best Seller list repeatedly, reaching the number one spot on several occasions.

She has been nominated six times for the RT Book Reviews Reviewers' Choice Awards, winning three times for Lover Awakened, Lover Unbound, and Lover Unleashed.
