= Alessandra Torre =

American novelist

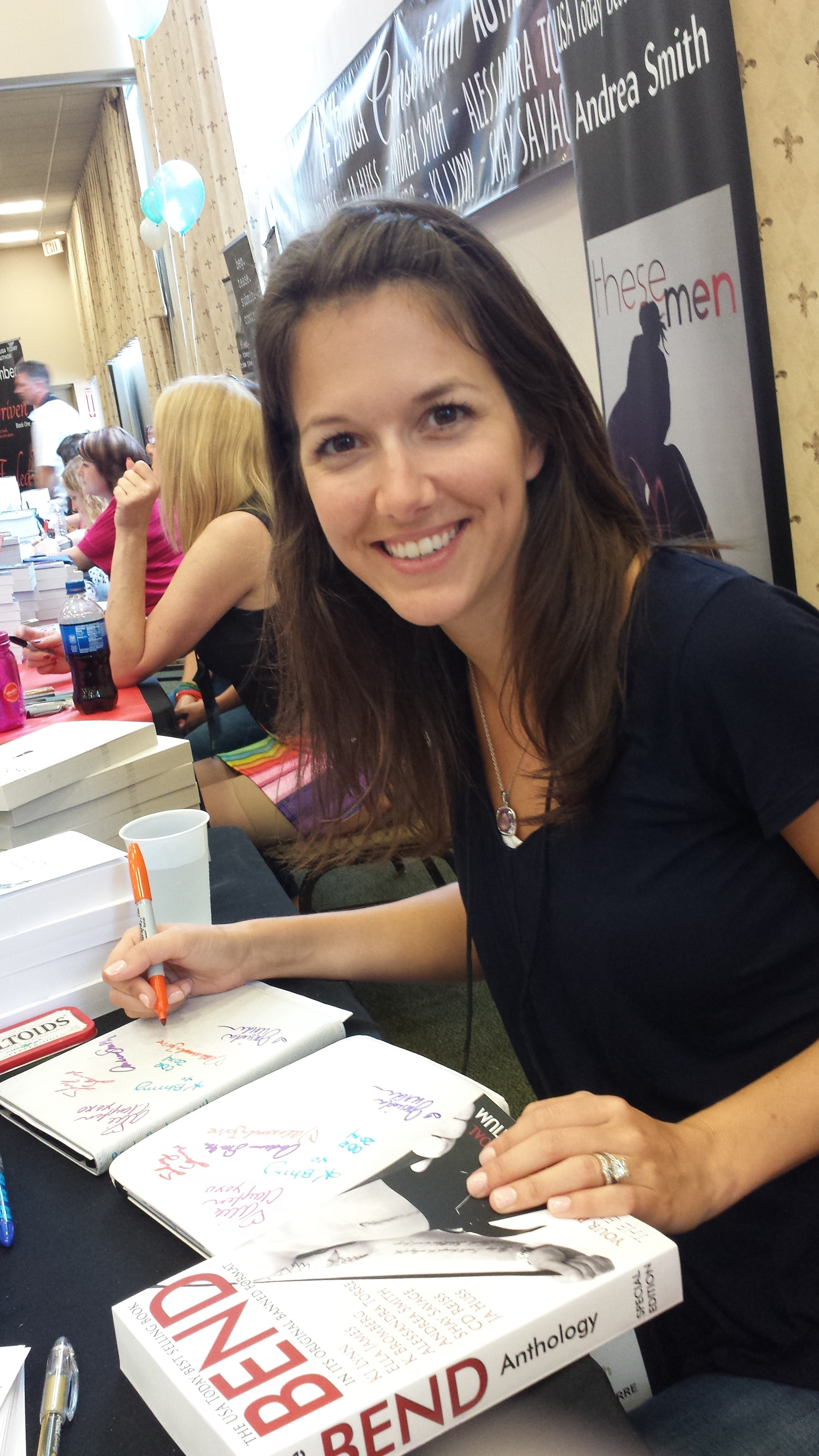
- Torre in 2014
- Born: Tallahassee, Florida, U.S.
- Occupation: Novelist
- Website: www.alessandratorre.com

Alessandra Torre is an American novelist, writing educator, and AI tech CEO.

Her early career lead to success in contemporary romance

Now she primarily write suspense under the pen name A. R. Torre, and is a New York Times, USA Today, Wall Street Journal and Amazon International bestselling novelist. Torre is the bedroom blogger for Cosmopolitan. She has been a guest columnist for the Huffington Post, RT Book Reviews, and was featured in Elle Magazine.

She cofounded Inkers Con with her sister Terezia Barna. "Inkers Con is a learning company focused on accelerating the success of indie fiction authors through conferences, workshops and communities.".

She is also the CEO of Authors.ai Their Marlowe AI analyses works of fiction and gives detailed reports.

In 2015, her novel The Girl in 6E was optioned for film by EuropaCorp. In 2017, her novel, Hollywood Dirt was released as a full-length movie by PassionFlix.

== Standalone novels ==
- 2014:- Black Lies
- 2015:- Tight
- 2015:- Hollywood Dirt
- 2016:- Moonshot
- 2017:- Love in Lingerie
- 2017:- Trophy Wife
- 2017:- Love Chloe
- 2017:- The Ghostwriter
- 2018:- Hidden Seams
- 2018:- Tripping on a Halo
- 2019:- Undertow
- 2019:- Filthy Vows
- 2019:- Twisted Marriage
- 2020:- The F List

== Series ==
- 2012:- The Innocence Trilogy
- 2012:- Blindfolded Innocence (The Innocence Trilogy #1)
- 2013:- The Diary of Brad De Luca (The Innocence Trilogy #1.5)
- 2014:- Masked Innocence (The Innocence Trilogy #2)
- 2014:- End of the Innocence (The Innocence Trilogy #3)
- 2014:- The Deanna Madden Series
- 2014:- The Girl in 6E (The Deanna Madden Series #1)
- 2015:- Do Not Disturb (The Deanna Madden Series #2)
- 2015:- If You Dare (The Deanna Madden Series #3)
- 2018:- Even Money (All In Duet #1)
- 2018:- Double Down (All In Duet #2)
- 2019:- Filthy Vows (Filthy Vows #1)
- 2019:- Twisted Marriage (Filthy Vows #2)

== Erotica ==
- 2014:- Just the Sex: Erotic Shorts
