= Ben Winspear =

Australian actor (born 1975/1976)

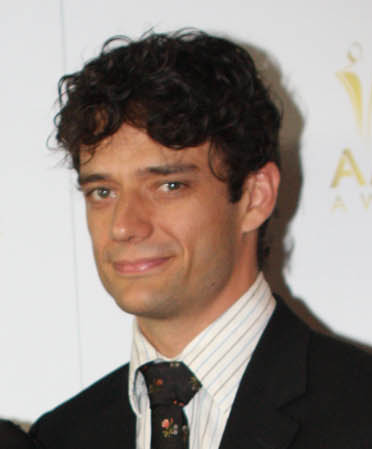
- Benjamin Winspear 2012 AACTA
- Born: 1975/1976 (age 50–51); Wagga Wagga, New South Wales, Australia
- Education: National Institute of Dramatic Art (1997)
- Occupation: Actor
- Known for: Underbelly: Badness (2012); Bay of Fires (2023)
- Partner: Marta Dusseldorp
- Children: 2
- Awards: Helpmann Award for Best Male Actor in a Play

Ben Winspear (born 1975/1976) is an Australian actor and director. He has an extensive history performing for theatre, and on screen is known for appearing in comedy drama series Bay of Fires (2023).

== Early life ==
Ben Winspear was born around 1975/1976 in Wagga Wagga, and was raised alongside younger brother Dallas in Hobart, Tasmania, where he attended an alternative community school. His father Les was a founding member of Hobart's Big Monkey Theatre, actor, director, and author of several plays.

In 1995, at the age of 19, Winspear relocated to Sydney, after being accepted into the National Institute of Dramatic Art (NIDA). He graduated in 1997, with a Bachelor of Dramatic Art (Acting).

== Career ==
=== Stage ===
Winspear has had a long career in theatre, as actor, adaptor, assistant director, director, dramaturge, lighting designer, performer, scenic artist and set designer. His first credited role was as flyman for a 1990 production of Don Pasquale at the Tasmanian Conservatorium of Music.

In 1998, after graduating from NIDA, Winspear was cast as Edmund in a production of King Lear for Bell Shakespeare. In 2002, he appeared in Same Same But Different, a major work created by Kate Champion with dance theatre company Force Majeure, touring the eastern states of Australia. That same year, he appeared in a stage production of Great Expectations at the Sydney Opera House.

Winspear was resident director at Sydney Theatre Company from 2003 to 2005, during which time he directed Morph, These People, This Little Piggy, The Metamorphosis, and Thyestes.

In 2008, Winspear played Viktor in a Sydney Theatre Company production of Frankenstein. In 2009, he appeared in Baghdad Wedding for Company B. He later appeared with wife Marta Dusseldorp in Joanna Murray-Smith's adaptation of Ingmar Bergman's 1973 film Scenes from a Marriage for Queensland Theatre, in 2017.

Additionally, Winspear was an associate artist for Sydney's Griffin Theatre Company, and has worked as assistant director with Barrie Kosky, Robyn Nevin, Howard Davies, Garry McDonald, and Jean-Pierre Mignon. Later, for Archipelago Productions, he directed sellout seasons of The Maids by Jean Genet, and Winterreise by Franz Schubert, as well as productions of The Bleeding Tree by Angus Cerini, which re-opened the Theatre Royal, and Venus and Adonis.

=== Screen ===
Winspear had a significant role in period drama series A Place to Call Home, playing René Nordmann, a war-damaged Jewish refugee and love interest for lead character Sarah Adams, played by his wife, Marta Dusseldorp. She also had in a main role in Underbelly: Badness, the fifth season of the Underbelly crime drama franchise, playing the task force's second-in-command, Detective Sergeant Tim Browne, opposite Jonathan LaPaglia and Matt Nable.

In 2014, Winspear had a recurring role as Sebastian Strong in Rake. That same year, he featured in horror film The Babadook, opposite Essie Davis and Daniel Henshall as the deceased husband of Davis's character. He then had a guest role as Con Heliotis in 2015 miniseries House of Hancock, opposite Mandy McElhinney, Peta Sergeant and Sam Neill. The following year, he appeared in drama thriller film Bad Girl, with Samara Weaving.

Winspear played the ongoing part of Sam in comedy series Rosehaven, from 2020 to 2021. More recently, he has appeared as Rowan Furness, a public servant in two episodes of crime comedy-drama series Bay of Fires in 2023. The series was co-produced by his company, Archipelago Productions.

== Other activities ==
Winspear is co-owner, with his wife Marta Dusseldorp, of film production company Archipelago Productions, in Hobart, Tasmania.

Winspear has been on the judging panel for the Patrick White Award and Young Writers Award.

== Awards and nominations ==
Year	Work	Award	Category	Result	Ref.
2002	Great Expectations	Helpmann Awards	Best Male Actor in a Play	Nominated	
2009	Baghdad Wedding	Helpmann Awards	Best Male Actor in a Play	Won	
2009	Baghdad Wedding	Sydney Theatre Awards	Best Male Actor in a Lead Role	Nominated	
2010	My Place	Australian Film Institute Awards	Best Guest or Supporting Actor in a Television Drama	Nominated	
2020	Gruesome Playground Injuries	Tasmanian Theatre Awards	Best Direction (Professional Theatre)	Nominated	
2022	The Maids	Tasmanian Theatre Awards	Best Direction (Professional Theatre)	Won	
2022	The Bleeding Tree	Tasmanian Theatre Awards	Best Direction (Professional Theatre)	Nominated	
2024	Past the Shallows	Tasmanian Theatre Awards	Best Direction (Professional Theatre)	Won	
2024	Women of Troy	Tasmanian Theatre Awards	Best Direction (Professional Theatre)	Nominated	

== Personal life ==
Winspear is married to actress Marta Dusseldorp. The couple met at the Sydney Theatre Company, while he was resident director and she was appearing in a production of The Way of the World. They met again later that year in Berlin, whereupon their relationship developed. They were married in February 2006.

The couple have two daughters. In 2018, the family relocated from their home in inner Sydney, to Hobart.

== Filmography ==
=== Film ===
Year	Title	Role	Notes	Ref.
2008	Every Other Weekend	Bart	Short	
2011	Loveless	Max	Short	
2012	Ricochet	Oliver	Short	
2013	The Last Goodbye	Joel		
2014	The Babadook	Oskar		
2015	Breeding in Captivity	Andrew	Film	
2016	Bad Girl	Peter Anderson		
2016	Perry	Ben's Mate	Short	
2017	Remembering Agatha	Bill	Short	
2017	Pile	Father	Short	
2017	The Suitor	Mr Sappleton	Short	
2021	Finding Jedda		Short	

=== Television ===
Year	Title	Role	Notes	Ref.
2009	My Place	Michaelis	2 episodes	
2011	Crownies	Dr Preston	1 episode	
2011	Panic at Rock Island	Baz Gaha	TV movie	
2012	Underbelly: Badness	Detective Sergeant Tim Browne	8 episodes	
2014	Black Comedy	Guest	2 episodes	
2014	Old School	Rodger	1 episode	
2014	Rake	Sebastian Strong	3 episodes	
2014–2015	A Place to Call Home	Dr. René Nordmann	11 episodes	
2015	House of Hancock	Con Heliotis	Miniseries, 1 episode	
2020–2021	Rosehaven	Sam	3 episodes	
2023	Bay of Fires	Rowan Furness	2 episodes	
2026	Ground Up	Garth	1 episode (1.6)	

== Theatre ==
=== As cast ===
Year	Title	Role	Notes	Ref.
1998	King Lear	Edmund	Bell Shakespeare	
2002	Same Same But Different		Australian tour with Force Majeure	
2002	Great Expectations		Sydney Opera House	
2006	Now That Communism Is Dead My Life Feels Empty		Malthouse Theatre, Melbourne with B Sharp	
2008	Frankenstein	Viktor	Sydney Theatre Company	
2009	Baghdad Wedding	Salim	Belvoir St Theatre, Sydney	
2011	Faustus	Faustus	Brisbane Powerhouse with QTC	
2014	Emerald City	Mike McCord	Stables Theatre, Sydney with Griffin Theatre Co	
2015	Elektra / Orestes	Aegisthus	Belvoir St Theatre, Sydney	
2017	Scenes from a Marriage	Johan	Playhouse, Brisbane with QTC	
2019	The Mares	Achilles	Peacock Theatre, Hobart with Tasmanian Theatre Company	
2020	Venus and Adonis	Adonis	Online at St David's Cathedral, Hobart with Archipelago Productions & regional tour with 10 Days on the Island	

=== As crew ===
Year	Title	Role	Notes	Ref.
1990	Don Pasquale	Flyman	Tasmanian Conservatorium of Music	
2000	Oedipus	Assistant Director	Wharf Theatre, Sydney with STC	
2001	Stones in His Pockets	Assistant Director	Fairfax Studio, Melbourne with MTC	
2001	King Lear	Director	STC	
2002	Macbeth	Director	Wharf Theatre, Sydney with STC	
2002	Saved	Director	NIDA, Sydney	
2003	The Tempest	Director	Wharf Theatre, Sydney with STC	
2003	Le Grand Macabre	Assistant Director	Komische Oper Berlin	
2003	Morph	Director	Wharf Theatre, Sydney with STC	
2004	Thyestes	Director	Wharf Theatre, Sydney with STC	
2004	Victory	Co-director	Wharf Theatre, Sydney with STC	
2004	The Miser	Assistant Director	Sydney Opera House with STC	
2005	The Metamorphosis	Director	Malthouse Theatre, Melbourne with STC	
2005	This Little Piggy	Director	Wharf Theatre, Sydney with STC	
2008	Pantagleize	Director	Myers Studio, Sydney with UNSW	
2008	The Women of Troy	Assistant Director	Merlyn Theatre, Melbourne with STC	
2009	Silver	Director	Belvoir, Sydney	
2011	Don Parties On	Assistant Director	Playhouse, Melbourne with MTC	
2011	Sweet Bird andsoforth	Translator	Mess Hall with atyp Under the Wharf, Sydney	
2014	Monkey – An Epic Tale of Cosmic Struggle	Director	UNSW, Sydney	
2016	Gloria	Associate Director	Griffin Theatre Co	
2016	The Good Wolf	Director	Griffin Theatre Co	
	Insect!	Director	UNSW, Sydney	
	These People	Director		
	The Bluebird	Director	Cranbrook School	
	The Cherry Orchard	Assistant Director		
	The Garden of Paradise	Director	10 Days on the Island	
2018	The Feather in the Web	Director	Stables Theatre, Sydney with Griffin Theatre Co	
2018	Twelve Times He Spoke	Director	Blue Cow Theatre with Performing Lines	
2019	Gruesome Playground Injuries	Director	Moonah Arts Centre, Hobart with Tasmanian Theatre Co	
2020	Venus and Adonis	Director	Online with St David's Cathedral, Hobart & Archipelago Productions; regional tour with 10 Days on the Island	
2020	The Bleeding Tree	Director	Online with Theatre Royal, Hobart, Archipelago Productions & Blue Cow Theatre	
2020	Perfect Stranger		Academy of the Arts, Launceston with UTAS & Archipelago Productions	
2021	Winterreise	Director	Old Mercury Building, Hobart with Archipelago Productions	
2021	The Maids	Director	Playhouse, Hobart with Archipelago Productions	
2021	The Masque of the Red Death	Director	St David's Cathedral, Hobart with Archipelago Productions & Mona Foma	
2023	The Carbon Neutral Adventures of the Indefatigable Enviroteens	Director	Theatre Royal, Hobart with Archipelago Productions	
2024	Past the Shallows	Director	Theatre Royal, Hobart with ATYP & Archipelago Productions	
