= Don't Tell =

Don't Tell may refer to:

- Don't Tell: The Sexual Abuse of Boys, a 1997 French non-fiction book
- Don't Tell (2005 film), an Italian film, also known as The Beast in the Heart
- Don't Tell (2017 film), an Australian drama film
