= Sara West =

Australian actress

- Born: Adelaide, South Australia, Australia
- Occupations: Actress; director; screenwriter
- Years active: 2010–present

Sara West is an Australian actress, director and screenwriter. She began her career with roles in short films and television roles. Her 2015 role as Liza Minnelli in television series Peter Allen: Not the Boy Next Door earned her a Logie Award nomination for Most Outstanding Newcomer. In 2017, West played Lyndal in the film, Don't Tell and was nominated for an AACTA Award. She also appeared in the main roles of the 2016 film Bad Girl, as Amy Anderson and the 2019 film, Awoken playing the medical student Karla. She also plays Brooke in ABC TV drama series Troppo. In 2023, West joined the cast of the soap opera Neighbours, playing Cara Varga-Murphy. West also writes and directs films and has won awards at the 2014 and 2018 South Australian Screen Awards.

== Early life ==
West grew up in the Murray River area of South Australia. When West was at high school, her mother encouraged her to take drama classes. West studied at the Flinders Drama Centre at Flinders University, Adelaide. West later moved to Sydney to continue pursuing further work. She and her university drama teacher, Richard Back set up their own production company called Salvage Productions.

== Career ==
West's first television role was Clarice Daley in the 2014 ABC1 television drama, ANZAC Girls. She then appeared in the Seven Network series Winter. Around this time, West began securing further work in theatre productions. In 2013, West directed the short film titled River Water. For her work on the film, West won the Best Emerging Filmmaker Award at the 2014 South Australian Screen Awards.

West developed her writing skills with the Australian Theatre for Young People (ATYP). She wrote the theatre play The Trolleys, and was the recipient of their 2014 Foundation Commission Award. The Trolley debuted on stage at the ATYP Studio 1 in Sydney.

In 2015, West played the main role of Liza Minnelli in Peter Allen: Not the Boy Next Door, a television drama mini-series that was broadcast on Seven Network. West recalled her shock when her agent got her an audition for the role. Prior to filming, West worked on mimicking Minelli's mannerisms, accent and her singing style. West stated that she really related to the role because they were both ambitious in their early careers. She was nominated for the 2016 Logie Award for Most Outstanding Newcomer for her role as Minnelli.

In 2016, West played the main character Amy Anderson in the film Bad Girl, alongside Samara Weaving, who played the other main role of Chloe Buchanan. She also played "a self-described bookworm" called Tanya, in two episodes of the second season of the American comedy series Ash vs Evil Dead, which was broadcast via Starz. West filmed the role in Auckland, New Zealand. In 2017, West played the role of Lyndal in the film, Don't Tell. Lyndal is a victim of sexual abuse who attempts to gain justice. She was nominated for the 2017 AACTA Award for Best Actress in a Leading Role for her role in Don't Tell. That year, she also played the role of Jennifer Hartley in Nine Network's drama Love Child.

In 2018, West wrote and directed the short films titled Mutt and Disco Dykes for the streaming service SBS on Demand. Disco Dykes was part of a collection of short films featuring LGBTIQ stories the broadcaster and the Government of New South Wales had commissioned and funded via their Emerging Filmmakers Fund. Mutt received four awards at the 2018 South Australian Screen Awards. West herself won the Best Directing award. That year, she played the role of Leah Baxter in the SBS crime series Dead Lucky. Her character is portrayed as pregnant and attempts to protect her brother from a police investigation. In 2019, West played the main role of Karla in the horror film Awoken. Karla is characterised as a medical student who is desperate to cure her brother's terminal sleepless illness.

In 2021, West played the title role of Iggy in AB Morrison's web-series Iggy and Ace. The show has queer themes and explores the issue of alcoholism. It was filmed in Perth and West's character was described as a "millennial with a drinking problem". That year she continued to appear in television series, first as Kelli in ABC iview's drama series Wakefield and Bianca in the Nine Network's drama Amazing Grace.

In 2022, West joined the cast of ABC TV drama series Troppo, playing the character Brooke. In 2023, West joined the cast of the Australian soap opera, Neighbours, playing the role of Cara Varga-Murphy who is in a same-sex relationship. West stated she was "honoured" to join the cast and hoped the inclusion of her character's family would "help better reflect the beautiful LGBTQIA+ community" that she proudly comes from. She also reprised her role as Brooke in the second series of Troppo.

On 26 October 2026, West was named as nine new cast members for Wentworth: Halfway Home.

== Filmography ==
=== Film ===
Year	Title	Role	Notes
2010	Nina	Emily	Short film
2010	The Turned	Cassie	Short film
2011	Collision	India	Short film
2013	Spine	Chloe	Short film
2013	One Eyed Girl	Sarah	Film
2013	Touch	Jessica	Short film
2015	The Daughter	Jane	Film
2016	Bad Girl	Amy Anderson	Film
2016	Trespass	Laura	Short film
2017	Don't Tell	Lyndal	Film
2017	Split Me	Scooter	Short film
2018	Ward One	Nurse	Short film
2018	Nursery Rhymes	Metalhead Girl	Short film
2018	Company	Amelia	Short film
2019	Top End Wedding	Rosemary	Film
2019	Awoken	Karla	Film
TBA	Dirt Girls	Grem	Short film

=== Television ===
Year	Title	Role	Notes
2014	ANZAC Girls	Clarice Daley	Regular role
2015	Winter	Indiana Hope	Main role
2015	Peter Allen: Not the Boy Next Door	Liza Minnelli	Main role
2016	Ash vs Evil Dead	Tanya	Guest role, Season 2
2017	Love Child	Jennifer Hartley	Guest role
2018	Dead Lucky	Leah Baxter	Regular role
2018	Jade of Death	Ebony	Guest role
2019	The Commons	Zoe	Guest role
2019	Drunk History Australia	Press / Party Member / Guest	Guest role
2020	Liberty Street	Sophie	Guest role
2021	Wakefield	Kelli	Guest role
2021	Amazing Grace	Bianca	Guest role
2021	Iggy and Ace	Iggy	Main role
2022–24	Troppo	Brooke	Recurring role
2023–2025	Neighbours	Cara Varga-Murphy	Regular role
2026	Wentworth: Halfway Home	Trina	TV series

== Awards and nominations ==
Year	Format	Association	Category	Nominated work	Result
2014	Film	South Australian Screen Awards	Best Emerging Filmmaker	River Water	Won
2016	Television	Logie Awards	Logie Award for Most Outstanding Newcomer	Peter Allen: Not the Boy Next Door	Nominated
2017	Television	AACTA Awards	AACTA Award for Best Actress in a Leading Role	Don't Tell	Nominated
2014	Film	South Australian Screen Awards	Best Directing	Mutt	Won
