= List of accolades received by Three Billboards Outside Ebbing, Missouri =

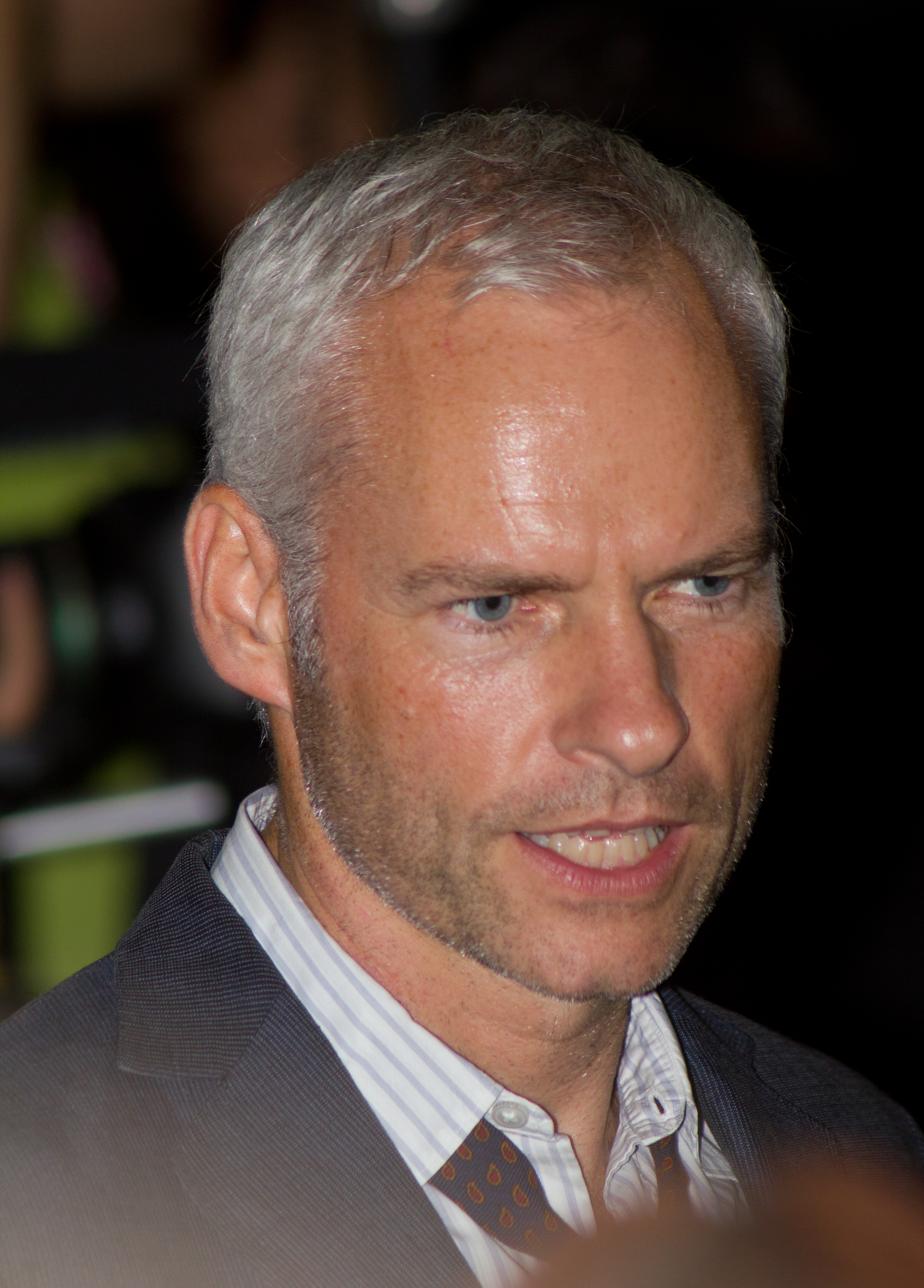
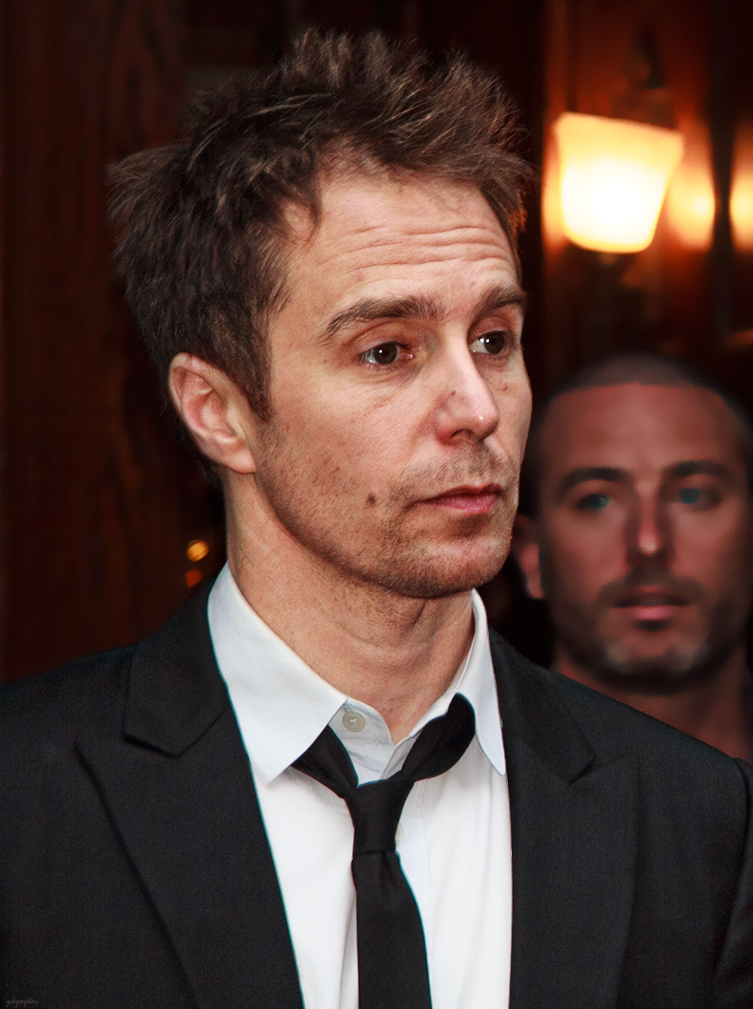
- Martin McDonagh (left) received critical acclaim for his screenplay and direction, and Frances McDormand (center) and Sam Rockwell (right) for their performances in the film.
Accolades
Award	Wins	Nominations
AACTA International Awards	3	5
AARP's Movies for Grownups Awards	0	3
Academy Awards	2	7
Alliance of Women Film Journalists	1	8
American Cinema Editors	0	1
American Film Institute	1	1
Art Directors Guild Awards	0	1
Austin Film Critics Association	2	5
British Academy Film Awards	5	9
British Independent Film Awards	2	11
Belgian Film Critics Association	0	1
Boston Society of Film Critics	1	1
Casting Society of America	1	1
Chicago Film Critics Association	0	4
Costume Designers Guild	0	1
Critics' Choice Movie Awards	3	6
Dallas–Fort Worth Film Critics Association	4	4
Denver International Film Festival	1	1
Detroit Film Critics Society	2	5
Directors Guild of America Awards	0	1
Dorian Awards	0	3
Empire Awards	0	3
Evening Standard British Film Awards	0	1
Florida Film Critics Circle	4	7
Georgia Film Critics Association	1	6
Golden Globe Awards	4	6
Grande Prêmio do Cinema Brasileiro	0	1
Hollywood Film Awards	1	1
Houston Film Critics Society	1	4
Humanitas Prize	0	1
IGN Awards	2	3
Independent Spirit Awards	2	3
IndieWire Critic's Poll	4	4
Location Managers Guild Awards	0	1
London Film Critics' Circle	3	7
Los Angeles Film Critics Association	3	3
Make-Up Artists and Hair Stylists Guild	0	1
National Society of Film Critics	2	2
Online Film Critics Society	4	5
Palm Springs International Film Festival	1	1
Producers Guild of America Awards	0	1
San Diego Film Critics Society	1	8
San Francisco Film Critics Circle	1	4
Satellite Awards	3	6
Saturn Awards	0	2
Screen Actors Guild Awards	3	4
Seattle Film Critics Society	0	5
St. Louis Film Critics Association	3	6
Toronto Film Critics Association	4	4
Vancouver Film Critics Circle	0	3
Venice Film Festival	1	2
Washington D.C. Area Film Critics Association	3	6
Women Film Critics Circle	2	2

Totals (Note: Certain award groups do not simply award one winner. They acknowledge several different recipients, have runners-up, and have third place. Since this is a specific recognition and is different from losing an award, runner-up mentions are considered wins in this award tally. For simplification and to avoid errors, each award in this list has been presumed to have had a prior nomination.)
- Wins: 81
- Nominations: 192

Three Billboards Outside Ebbing, Missouri is a 2017 black comedy crime film written, produced, and directed by Martin McDonagh. The film stars Frances McDormand as a mother who, when the police in her town fail to find a suspect in her daughter's murder, purchases three billboards to call public attention to the unsolved crime, polarizing the community. Woody Harrelson, Sam Rockwell, John Hawkes, and Peter Dinklage feature in supporting roles.

The film premiered at the 74th Venice International Film Festival on September 4, 2017. It began a limited release in the United States on November 10, 2017, before Fox Searchlight Pictures gave the film a wide release at over 1,430 theaters in the United States and Canada on December 1. The film has so far earned $159.6 million at the worldwide box office, against a production budget of $12 million. Rotten Tomatoes, a review aggregator, surveyed 243 reviews and judged 93% of them to be positive. Metacritic calculated a weighted average score of 88 out of 100 based on 49 reviews, indicating "universal acclaim".

Three Billboards Outside Ebbing, Missouri has received numerous awards and nominations, recognizing the cast's performances, particularly McDormand and Rockwell; several technical areas, including the film's cinematography, sound, and editing; and McDonagh's screenplay and direction. The film garnered six nominations at the 75th Golden Globe Awards and won Best Motion Picture – Drama, Best Actress – Drama for McDormand, Best Supporting Actor for Rockwell, and Best Screenplay. At the 23rd Critics' Choice Awards, the film was nominated for six awards and won Best Actress for McDormand, Best Supporting Actor for Rockwell, and Best Acting Ensemble. The film was nominated for 7 Oscars at the 90th Academy Awards, including Best Picture, Best Original Screenplay for Martin McDonagh, Best Actress for Frances McDormand and two Best Supporting Actor nominations for both Sam Rockwell and Woody Harrelson, with Rockwell and McDormand winning in their respective categories. In addition, the American Film Institute selected Three Billboards Outside Ebbing, Missouri as one of its ten films of the year.

== Accolades ==
Award	Date of ceremony	Category	Nominee(s)	Result	Ref(s)
AACTA International Awards	January 6, 2018	Best Film	Three Billboards Outside Ebbing, Missouri	Won	
AACTA International Awards	January 6, 2018	Best Actress	Frances McDormand	Nominated	
AACTA International Awards	January 6, 2018	Best Screenplay	Martin McDonagh	Won	
AACTA International Awards	January 6, 2018	Best Supporting Actor	Sam Rockwell	Won	
AACTA International Awards	January 6, 2018	Best Supporting Actress	Abbie Cornish	Nominated	
AARP's Movies for Grownups Awards	February 5, 2018	Best Actress	Frances McDormand	Nominated	
AARP's Movies for Grownups Awards	February 5, 2018	Best Picture	Three Billboards Outside Ebbing, Missouri	Nominated	
AARP's Movies for Grownups Awards	February 5, 2018	Best Supporting Actor	Woody Harrelson	Nominated	
Academy Awards	March 4, 2018	Best Picture	Graham Broadbent, Pete Czernin, and Martin McDonagh	Nominated	
Academy Awards	March 4, 2018	Best Actress	Frances McDormand	Won	
Academy Awards	March 4, 2018	Best Supporting Actor	Woody Harrelson	Nominated	
Academy Awards	March 4, 2018	Best Supporting Actor	Sam Rockwell	Won	
Academy Awards	March 4, 2018	Best Original Screenplay	Martin McDonagh	Nominated	
Academy Awards	March 4, 2018	Best Film Editing	Jon Gregory	Nominated	
Academy Awards	March 4, 2018	Best Original Score	Carter Burwell	Nominated	
Alliance of Women Film Journalists	January 9, 2018	Actress Defying Age and Ageism	Frances McDormand	Nominated	
Alliance of Women Film Journalists	January 9, 2018	Best Actor in a Supporting Role	Sam Rockwell	Nominated	
Alliance of Women Film Journalists	January 9, 2018	Best Actress	Frances McDormand	Won	
Alliance of Women Film Journalists	January 9, 2018	Best Director	Martin McDonagh	Nominated	
Alliance of Women Film Journalists	January 9, 2018	Best Ensemble Cast – Casting Director	Sarah Halley Finn	Nominated	
Alliance of Women Film Journalists	January 9, 2018	Best Film	Three Billboards Outside Ebbing, Missouri	Nominated	
Alliance of Women Film Journalists	January 9, 2018	Best Original Screenplay	Martin McDonagh	Nominated	
Alliance of Women Film Journalists	January 9, 2018	Bravest Performance	Frances McDormand	Nominated	
American Cinema Editors	January 26, 2018	Best Edited Feature Film – Comedy or Musical	Jon Gregory	Nominated	
American Film Institute	January 5, 2018	Top Ten Films of the Year	Three Billboards Outside Ebbing, Missouri	Won	
Art Directors Guild	January 27, 2018	Excellence in Production Design for a Contemporary Film	Inbal Weinberg	Nominated	
Austin Film Critics Association	January 8, 2018	Best Actress	Frances McDormand	Won	
Austin Film Critics Association	January 8, 2018	Best Film	Three Billboards Outside Ebbing, Missouri	Nominated	
Austin Film Critics Association	January 8, 2018	Best Original Screenplay	Martin McDonagh	Nominated	
Austin Film Critics Association	January 8, 2018	Best Supporting Actor	Sam Rockwell	Nominated	
Austin Film Critics Association	January 8, 2018	Top 10 Films	Three Billboards Outside Ebbing, Missouri	4th Place	
Belgian Film Critics Association	January 5, 2019	Grand Prix	Three Billboards Outside Ebbing, Missouri	Nominated	
Boston Society of Film Critics	December 10, 2017	Best Supporting Actor	Sam Rockwell	Runner-up	
BAFTA Awards	February 18, 2018	Best Actor in a Supporting Role	Woody Harrelson	Nominated	
BAFTA Awards	February 18, 2018	Best Actor in a Supporting Role	Sam Rockwell	Won	
BAFTA Awards	February 18, 2018	Best Actress in a Leading Role	Frances McDormand	Won	
BAFTA Awards	February 18, 2018	Best British Film	Graham Broadbent, Pete Czernin and Martin McDonagh	Won	
BAFTA Awards	February 18, 2018	Best Cinematography	Ben Davis	Nominated	
BAFTA Awards	February 18, 2018	Best Direction	Martin McDonagh	Nominated	
BAFTA Awards	February 18, 2018	Best Editing	Jon Gregory	Nominated	
BAFTA Awards	February 18, 2018	Best Film	Graham Broadbent, Pete Czernin and Martin McDonagh	Won	
BAFTA Awards	February 18, 2018	Best Original Screenplay	Martin McDonagh	Won	
British Independent Film Awards	December 10, 2017	Best Actress	Frances McDormand	Nominated	
British Independent Film Awards	December 10, 2017	Best British Independent Film	Three Billboards Outside Ebbing, Missouri	Nominated	
British Independent Film Awards	December 10, 2017	Best Casting	Sarah Halley Finn	Nominated	
British Independent Film Awards	December 10, 2017	Best Cinematography	Ben Davis	Nominated	
British Independent Film Awards	December 10, 2017	Best Director	Martin McDonagh	Nominated	
British Independent Film Awards	December 10, 2017	Best Editing	Jon Gregory	Won	
British Independent Film Awards	December 10, 2017	Best Music	Carter Burwell	Won	
British Independent Film Awards	December 10, 2017	Best Screenplay	Martin McDonagh	Nominated	
British Independent Film Awards	December 10, 2017	Best Sound	Joakim Sundström	Nominated	
British Independent Film Awards	December 10, 2017	Best Supporting Actor	Woody Harrelson	Nominated	
British Independent Film Awards	December 10, 2017	Best Supporting Actor	Sam Rockwell	Nominated	
Casting Society of America	January 18, 2018	Studio or Independent – Drama	Hannah Cooper, Sarah Halley Finn and Meagan Lewis	Won	
Chicago Film Critics Association	December 12, 2017	Best Actress	Frances McDormand	Nominated	
Chicago Film Critics Association	December 12, 2017	Best Film	Three Billboards Outside Ebbing, Missouri	Nominated	
Chicago Film Critics Association	December 12, 2017	Best Original Screenplay	Martin McDonagh	Nominated	
Chicago Film Critics Association	December 12, 2017	Best Supporting Actor	Sam Rockwell	Nominated	
Costume Designers Guild	February 20, 2018	Excellence in Contemporary Film	Melissa Toth	Nominated	
Critics' Choice Movie Awards	January 11, 2018	Best Picture	Three Billboards Outside Ebbing, Missouri	Nominated	
Critics' Choice Movie Awards	January 11, 2018	Best Director	Martin McDonagh	Nominated	
Critics' Choice Movie Awards	January 11, 2018	Best Actress	Frances McDormand	Won	
Critics' Choice Movie Awards	January 11, 2018	Best Supporting Actor	Sam Rockwell	Won	
Critics' Choice Movie Awards	January 11, 2018	Best Original Screenplay	Martin McDonagh	Nominated	
Critics' Choice Movie Awards	January 11, 2018	Best Acting Ensemble	The cast of Three Billboards Outside Ebbing, Missouri	Won	
Dallas–Fort Worth Film Critics Association	December 13, 2017	Best Actress	Frances McDormand	2nd Place	
Dallas–Fort Worth Film Critics Association	December 13, 2017	Best Film	Three Billboards Outside Ebbing, Missouri	7th Place	
Dallas–Fort Worth Film Critics Association	December 13, 2017	Best Supporting Actor	Woody Harrelson	5th Place	
Dallas–Fort Worth Film Critics Association	December 13, 2017	Best Supporting Actor	Sam Rockwell	Won	
Detroit Film Critics Society	December 7, 2017	Best Actress	Frances McDormand	Won	
Detroit Film Critics Society	December 7, 2017	Best Ensemble	The cast of Three Billboards Outside Ebbing, Missouri	Nominated	
Detroit Film Critics Society	December 7, 2017	Best Film	Three Billboards Outside Ebbing, Missouri	Nominated	
Detroit Film Critics Society	December 7, 2017	Best Screenplay	Martin McDonagh	Won	
Detroit Film Critics Society	December 7, 2017	Best Supporting Actor	Sam Rockwell	Nominated	
Directors Guild of America Awards	February 3, 2018	Outstanding Directing – Feature Film	Martin McDonagh	Nominated	
Dorian Awards	February 24, 2018	Best Performance of the Year – Actress	Frances McDormand	Nominated	
Dorian Awards	February 24, 2018	Supporting Film Performance of the Year – Actor	Sam Rockwell	Nominated	
Dorian Awards	February 24, 2018	Screenplay of the Year	Martin McDonagh	Nominated	
Empire Awards	March 18, 2018	Best Actress	Frances McDormand	Nominated	
Empire Awards	March 18, 2018	Best Screenplay	Martin McDonagh	Nominated	
Empire Awards	March 18, 2018	Best Thriller	Three Billboards Outside Ebbing, Missouri	Nominated	
Evening Standard British Film Awards	February 8, 2018	Best Screenplay	Martin McDonagh	Nominated	
Florida Film Critics Circle	December 23, 2017	Best Actress	Frances McDormand	Runner-up	
Florida Film Critics Circle	December 23, 2017	Best Cast	The cast of Three Billboards Outside Ebbing, Missouri	Won	
Florida Film Critics Circle	December 23, 2017	Best Director	Martin McDonagh	Nominated	
Florida Film Critics Circle	December 23, 2017	Best Film	Three Billboards Outside Ebbing, Missouri	Nominated	
Florida Film Critics Circle	December 23, 2017	Best Original Screenplay	Martin McDonagh	Runner-up	
Florida Film Critics Circle	December 23, 2017	Best Score	Carter Burwell	Nominated	
Florida Film Critics Circle	December 23, 2017	Best Supporting Actor	Sam Rockwell	Won	
Georgia Film Critics Association	January 12, 2018	Best Actress	Frances McDormand	Nominated	
Georgia Film Critics Association	January 12, 2018	Best Ensemble	The cast of Three Billboards Outside Ebbing, Missouri	Won	
Georgia Film Critics Association	January 12, 2018	Best Original Screenplay	Martin McDonagh	Nominated	
Georgia Film Critics Association	January 12, 2018	Best Picture	Three Billboards Outside Ebbing, Missouri	Nominated	
Georgia Film Critics Association	January 12, 2018	Best Supporting Actor	Woody Harrelson	Nominated	
Georgia Film Critics Association	January 12, 2018	Best Supporting Actor	Sam Rockwell	Nominated	
Golden Eagle Award	January 25, 2019	Best Foreign Language Film	Three Billboards Outside Ebbing, Missouri	Won	
Golden Globe Awards	January 7, 2018	Best Actress – Motion Picture Drama	Frances McDormand	Won	
Golden Globe Awards	January 7, 2018	Best Director	Martin McDonagh	Nominated	
Golden Globe Awards	January 7, 2018	Best Motion Picture – Drama	Three Billboards Outside Ebbing, Missouri	Won	
Golden Globe Awards	January 7, 2018	Best Original Score	Carter Burwell	Nominated	
Golden Globe Awards	January 7, 2018	Best Screenplay	Martin McDonagh	Won	
Golden Globe Awards	January 7, 2018	Best Supporting Actor – Motion Picture	Sam Rockwell	Won	
Grande Prêmio do Cinema Brasileiro	August 14, 2019	Best Foreign Feature Film	Three Billboards Outside Ebbing, Missouri	Nominated	
Hollywood Film Awards	November 5, 2017	Hollywood Supporting Actor Award	Sam Rockwell	Won	
Houston Film Critics Society	January 6, 2018	Best Actress	Frances McDormand	Nominated	
Houston Film Critics Society	January 6, 2018	Best Picture	Three Billboards Outside Ebbing, Missouri	Nominated	
Houston Film Critics Society	January 6, 2018	Best Screenplay	Martin McDonagh	Nominated	
Houston Film Critics Society	January 6, 2018	Best Supporting Actor	Sam Rockwell	Won	
Humanitas Prize	February 16, 2018	Feature – Drama	Martin McDonagh	Nominated	
IGN Awards	December 19, 2017	Best Director	Martin McDonagh	Nominated	
IGN Awards	December 19, 2017	Best Drama Movie	Three Billboards Outside Ebbing, Missouri	Won	
IGN Awards	December 19, 2017	Best Lead Performer in a Movie	Frances McDormand	Won	
Independent Spirit Awards	March 3, 2018	Best Female Lead	Frances McDormand	Won	
Independent Spirit Awards	March 3, 2018	Best Screenplay	Martin McDonagh	Nominated	
Independent Spirit Awards	March 3, 2018	Best Supporting Male	Sam Rockwell	Won	
IndieWire Critics Poll	December 19, 2017	Best Actress	Frances McDormand	2nd Place	
IndieWire Critics Poll	December 19, 2017	Best Picture	Three Billboards Outside Ebbing, Missouri	9th Place	
IndieWire Critics Poll	December 19, 2017	Best Screenplay	Martin McDonagh	5th Place	
IndieWire Critics Poll	December 19, 2017	Best Supporting Actor	Sam Rockwell	2nd Place	
Location Managers Guild Awards	April 7, 2018	Outstanding Locations in Contemporary Film	Robert Foulkes	Nominated	
London Film Critics Circle	January 28, 2018	Actress of the Year	Frances McDormand	Won	
London Film Critics Circle	January 28, 2018	British/Irish Film of the Year	Three Billboards Outside Ebbing, Missouri	Nominated	
London Film Critics Circle	January 28, 2018	Director of the Year	Martin McDonagh	Nominated	
London Film Critics Circle	January 28, 2018	Film of the Year	Three Billboards Outside Ebbing, Missouri	Won	
London Film Critics Circle	January 28, 2018	Screenwriter of the Year	Martin McDonagh	Won	
London Film Critics Circle	January 28, 2018	Supporting Actor of the Year	Woody Harrelson	Nominated	
London Film Critics Circle	January 28, 2018	Supporting Actor of the Year	Sam Rockwell	Nominated	
Los Angeles Film Critics Association	December 3, 2017	Best Actress	Frances McDormand	Runner-up	
Los Angeles Film Critics Association	December 3, 2017	Best Screenplay	Martin McDonagh	Runner-up	
Los Angeles Film Critics Association	December 3, 2017	Best Supporting Actor	Sam Rockwell	Runner-up	
Make-Up Artists and Hair Stylists Guild	February 24, 2018	Feature Motion Picture: Best Contemporary Hair Styling	Susan Buffington and Cydney Cornell	Nominated	
Motion Picture Sound Editors	February 22, 2018	Best Sound Editing – Dialogue and ADR for Feature Film	Joakim Sundström, Brian Bowles, Matthew Skelding	Nominated	
National Society of Film Critics	January 6, 2018	Best Actress	Frances McDormand	3rd Place	
National Society of Film Critics	January 6, 2018	Best Supporting Actor	Sam Rockwell	3rd Place	
Online Film Critics Society	December 28, 2017	Best Actress	Frances McDormand	Runner-up	
Online Film Critics Society	December 28, 2017	Best Ensemble	The cast of Three Billboards Outside Ebbing, Missouri	Won	
Online Film Critics Society	December 28, 2017	Best Original Screenplay	Martin McDonagh	Runner-up	
Online Film Critics Society	December 28, 2017	Best Picture	Three Billboards Outside Ebbing, Missouri	Nominated	
Online Film Critics Society	December 28, 2017	Best Supporting Actor	Sam Rockwell	Won	
Palm Springs International Film Festival	January 2, 2018	Spotlight Award	Sam Rockwell	Won	
Producers Guild of America Awards	January 20, 2018	Best Theatrical Motion Picture	Graham Broadbent, Pete Czernin and Martin McDonagh	Nominated	
San Diego Film Critics Society	December 11, 2017	Best Actress	Frances McDormand	Nominated	
San Diego Film Critics Society	December 11, 2017	Best Director	Martin McDonagh	Nominated	
San Diego Film Critics Society	December 11, 2017	Best Ensemble	The cast of Three Billboards Outside Ebbing, Missouri	Nominated	
San Diego Film Critics Society	December 11, 2017	Best Editing	Jon Gregory	Nominated	
San Diego Film Critics Society	December 11, 2017	Best Film	Three Billboards Outside Ebbing, Missouri	Nominated	
San Diego Film Critics Society	December 11, 2017	Best Original Screenplay	Martin McDonagh	Nominated	
San Diego Film Critics Society	December 11, 2017	Best Supporting Actor	Woody Harrelson	Nominated	
San Diego Film Critics Society	December 11, 2017	Best Supporting Actor	Sam Rockwell	Won	
San Diego International Film Festival	October 7, 2017	Audience Choice – Best Studio Film	Three Billboards Outside Ebbing, Missouri	Won	
San Francisco Film Critics Circle	December 10, 2017	Best Actress	Frances McDormand	Nominated	
San Francisco Film Critics Circle	December 10, 2017	Best Film	Three Billboards Outside Ebbing, Missouri	Nominated	
San Francisco Film Critics Circle	December 10, 2017	Best Supporting Actor	Sam Rockwell	Won	
San Francisco Film Critics Circle	December 10, 2017	Best Original Screenplay	Martin McDonagh	Nominated	
Satellite Awards	February 10, 2018	Best Actress	Frances McDormand	Nominated	
Satellite Awards	February 10, 2018	Best Cinematography	Ben Davis	Nominated	
Satellite Awards	February 10, 2018	Best Film	Three Billboards Outside Ebbing, Missouri	Won (Note: Tied with God's Own Country)	
Satellite Awards	February 10, 2018	Best Film Editing	Jon Gregory	Nominated	
Satellite Awards	February 10, 2018	Best Original Screenplay	Martin McDonagh	Won	
Satellite Awards	February 10, 2018	Best Supporting Actor	Sam Rockwell	Won	
Saturn Awards	June 27, 2018	Best Thriller Film	Three Billboards Outside Ebbing, Missouri	Won	
Saturn Awards	June 27, 2018	Best Actress	Frances McDormand	Nominated	
Screen Actors Guild Awards	January 21, 2018	Outstanding Performance by a Cast in a Motion Picture	The cast of Three Billboards Outside Ebbing, Missouri	Won	
Screen Actors Guild Awards	January 21, 2018	Outstanding Performance by a Female Actor in a Leading Role	Frances McDormand	Won	
Screen Actors Guild Awards	January 21, 2018	Outstanding Performance by a Male Actor in a Supporting Role	Woody Harrelson	Nominated	
Screen Actors Guild Awards	January 21, 2018	Outstanding Performance by a Male Actor in a Supporting Role	Sam Rockwell	Won	
Seattle Film Critics Society	December 18, 2017	Best Actress	Frances McDormand	Nominated	
Seattle Film Critics Society	December 18, 2017	Best Ensemble	The cast of Three Billboards Outside Ebbing, Missouri	Nominated	
Seattle Film Critics Society	December 18, 2017	Best Picture	Three Billboards Outside Ebbing, Missouri	Nominated	
Seattle Film Critics Society	December 18, 2017	Best Screenplay	Martin McDonagh	Nominated	
Seattle Film Critics Society	December 18, 2017	Best Supporting Actor	Sam Rockwell	Nominated	
St. Louis Film Critics Association	December 17, 2017	Best Actress	Frances McDormand	Won	
St. Louis Film Critics Association	December 17, 2017	Best Original Screenplay	Martin McDonagh	Nominated	
St. Louis Film Critics Association	December 17, 2017	Best Film	Three Billboards Outside Ebbing, Missouri	Nominated	
St. Louis Film Critics Association	December 17, 2017	Best Soundtrack	Three Billboards Outside Ebbing, Missouri	Runner-up	
St. Louis Film Critics Association	December 17, 2017	Best Supporting Actor	Woody Harrelson	Nominated	
St. Louis Film Critics Association	December 17, 2017	Best Supporting Actor	Sam Rockwell	Runner-up	
Toronto Film Critics Association	December 10, 2017	Best Actress	Frances McDormand	Won	
Toronto Film Critics Association	December 10, 2017	Best Film	Three Billboards Outside Ebbing, Missouri	Runner-up	
Toronto Film Critics Association	December 10, 2017	Best Screenplay	Martin McDonagh	Runner-up	
Toronto Film Critics Association	December 10, 2017	Best Supporting Actor	Sam Rockwell	Runner-up	
Vancouver Film Critics Circle	January 6, 2018	Best Actress	Frances McDormand	Nominated	
Vancouver Film Critics Circle	January 6, 2018	Best Screenplay	Martin McDonagh	Nominated	
Vancouver Film Critics Circle	January 6, 2018	Best Supporting Actor	Sam Rockwell	Nominated	
Venice Film Festival	September 9, 2017	Golden Lion	Three Billboards Outside Ebbing, Missouri	Nominated	
Venice Film Festival	September 9, 2017	Best Screenplay Award	Martin McDonagh	Won	
Washington D.C. Area Film Critics Association	December 8, 2017	Best Acting Ensemble	The cast of Three Billboards Outside Ebbing, Missouri	Won	
Washington D.C. Area Film Critics Association	December 8, 2017	Best Actress	Frances McDormand	Won	
Washington D.C. Area Film Critics Association	December 8, 2017	Best Film	Three Billboards Outside Ebbing, Missouri	Nominated	
Washington D.C. Area Film Critics Association	December 8, 2017	Best Original Score	Carter Burwell	Nominated	
Washington D.C. Area Film Critics Association	December 8, 2017	Best Original Screenplay	Martin McDonagh	Nominated	
Washington D.C. Area Film Critics Association	December 8, 2017	Best Supporting Actor	Sam Rockwell	Won	
Women Film Critics Circle	December 17, 2017	Best Actress	Frances McDormand	Won	
Women Film Critics Circle	December 17, 2017	Courage in Acting	Frances McDormand	Won	

== See also ==
- 2017 in film
