= Bad Girl (2016 film) =

2016 film by Fin Edquist

- Theatrical release poster
- Directed by: Fin Edquist
- Written by: Fin Edquist
- Produced by: Stephen Kearney; Bruno Charlesworth; Tenille Kennedy
- Starring: Sara West; Samara Weaving; Ben Winspear; Felicity Price; Rebecca Massey
- Cinematography: Gavin John Head
- Edited by: Simon Njoo
- Music by: Warren Ellis
- Production companies: Kmunications; George Nille & Co.; Immaculate Conception
- Distributed by: Curious Film
- Release dates: 11 August 2016 (MIFF); 27 April 2017 (Australia)
- Running time: 90 minutes
- Country: Australia
- Language: English

Bad Girl is a 2016 Australian thriller drama written and film directed by Fin Edquist, starring Sara West, Samara Weaving, Ben Winspear, Felicity Price and Rebecca Massey.

== Synopsis ==
Seventeen-year-old Amy plans to escape the care of her adoptive parents, who approve of her friendship with local girl Chloe. However, when Amy discovers a dark secret about the seemingly perfect Chloe, she finds herself fighting for her life and the family she tried to leave.

== Cast ==
- Sara West as Amy Anderson
- Samara Weaving as Chloe Buchanan
- Ben Winspear as Peter Anderson
- Felicity Price as Michelle Anderson
- Rebecca Massey as Detective Daniels

== Release ==
The film premiered at the Melbourne International Film Festival on 11 August 2016. It was released theatrically in Australia on 27 April 2017 by Curious Film.

== Reception ==
John Noonan of FilmInk rated the film $16.25 out of $20.00 and wrote that it "manages to be unbearably tense".

Luiz H. C. of Bloody Disgusting rated the film 3.5 skulls out of 5 and called it "thoroughly entertaining" and "remarkably solid".

Cindy Shi of Pelican wrote that the "universally relevant themes of family belonging, trust, and betrayal" allow the film to "transcend the boundary of an Australian independent film, to one capable of an international reception."

Craig Mathieson of The Age rated the film 3 stars out of 5 and wrote that the film "twists perceptions of adolescent camaraderie, attraction, and family's grip, with just enough shocks to allay the familiar conclusion."

== See also ==
- Cinema of Australia
