= Squirrel Boys =

Australian web series

- Genre: Comedy
- Written by: Kurt Martin; Jim Robison
- Directed by: Kurt Martin
- Starring: Samara Weaving; Paul Barton; Simon Westaway; Ian Bezzina; Jim Robison
- Country of origin: Australia
- Original language: English
- No. of seasons: 1
- No. of episodes: 4

Production
- Producers: Jim Robison; Milan Pulvermacher
- Production location: Australia
- Cinematography: Glenn Hanns
- Editor: Dan Berghofer

Original release
- Network: YouTube
- Release: 11 March – 7 April 2015

Squirrel Boys is a 2015 Australian web series directed by Kurt Martin and produced by Jim Robison, starring Samara Weaving, Paul Barton, Simon Westaway, Ian Bezzina, and Jim Robison.

== Cast ==
- Samara Weaving as Kelly
- Simon Westaway as the Coach
- Paul Barton
- Ian Bezzina
- Jim Robison
- Julian Pulvermacher as Chainsaw Preacher
- Milan Pulvermacher

== Plot ==
Nine year old Andy's best friend is Rodney J. Squirrel, with whom he has fun adventures around the neighbourhood.
