= Hassan Abdulrazzak =

Iraqi playwright and writer

Hassan Abdulrazzak (Arabic: حسن عبد الرزاق) is an Iraqi playwright and writer. He was born in Prague and studied molecular biology at university, obtaining a PhD from University College London in 1999. He has written a number of plays including Baghdad Wedding (2007), The Prophet (2012), Dhow Under The Sun, Catalina (both performed in 2015), Love, Bombs & Apples (2016), And Here I Am (2017). His plays have been produced in the UK, India and elsewhere. His writings have also been published in Banipal magazine.

Awards include George Devine, Meyer-Whitworth and Arab British Centre's Award for Culture in 2013. He was elected a Fellow of the Royal Society of Literature in 2024.
