= Three Billboards Outside Ebbing, Missouri =

2017 film by Martin McDonagh

- Theatrical release poster
- Directed by: Martin McDonagh
- Written by: Martin McDonagh
- Produced by: Graham Broadbent; Peter Czernin; Martin McDonagh
- Starring: Frances McDormand; Woody Harrelson; Sam Rockwell; Abbie Cornish; John Hawkes; Peter Dinklage
- Cinematography: Ben Davis
- Edited by: Jon Gregory
- Music by: Carter Burwell
- Production companies: Film4; Blueprint Pictures
- Distributed by: Fox Searchlight Pictures
- Release dates: September 4, 2017 (Venice); November 10, 2017 (United States); January 12, 2018 (United Kingdom)
- Running time: 115 minutes
- Country: United Kingdom
- Language: English
- Budget: $12–15 million
- Box office: $162.7 million

Three Billboards Outside Ebbing, Missouri is a 2017 British comedy-drama crime film (Note: Described as a genre-defying film, Three Billboards Outside Ebbing, Missouri incorporates a hybrid of Southern Gothic, neo-Western, satire, and vigilante elements..) written, directed, and produced by Martin McDonagh. It stars Frances McDormand as Mildred Hayes, a Missouri woman who rents three roadside billboards to draw attention to her daughter's unsolved rape and murder. Woody Harrelson, Sam Rockwell, Abbie Cornish, John Hawkes, Lucas Hedges and Peter Dinklage appear in supporting roles. The film was theatrically released in the United States in November 2017 and in the United Kingdom in January 2018 by Fox Searchlight Pictures, and it grossed $162 million at the worldwide box office.

It received widespread critical acclaim, particularly for McDonagh's screenplay and direction, and the performances of its ensemble cast (particularly McDormand, Rockwell and Harrelson), although the film's depiction of violence, race, and social themes was criticized by some reviewers. The film won numerous accolades, including five BAFTA Awards, four Golden Globe Awards, and three Screen Actors Guild Awards. It also received seven nominations at the 90th Academy Awards, including Best Picture, Best Supporting Actor (Harrelson) and winning Best Actress (McDormand) and Best Supporting Actor (Rockwell). The Writers Guild of America ranked the film's screenplay the 80th-greatest of the 21st century.

== Plot ==
In the fictional town of Ebbing, Missouri, Mildred Hayes is grieving over the rape and murder of her teen daughter, Angela. Angry over the lack of progress in the investigation, she rents three disused billboards near her home and posts on them: "Raped While Dying", "And Still No Arrests?", "How Come, Chief Willoughby?". Many townspeople are upset by the billboards for singling out local police chief Bill Willoughby, whose pancreatic cancer diagnosis is an open secret. Willoughby visits Mildred to persuade her to take them down, but is unsuccessful. He renews his efforts to solve the case, but does not get anywhere.

Police officer Jason Dixon unsuccessfully tries to intimidate Red Welby, who leased Mildred the billboards, into taking them down. Mildred's dentist is sympathetic to Willoughby and menaces her during an appointment, so she drills a hole in his thumbnail. Willoughby brings her in for questioning and accidentally coughs up blood into her face. He has her released and is hospitalized, though he soon checks himself out against medical advice.

The billboards have further strained Mildred's relationship with her son, Robbie, and she recalls that her last interaction with Angela was an argument (during which she lashed back by saying "hope you get raped"). Her abusive former police officer ex-husband Charlie confronts her about the billboards and ends up revealing that, shortly before Angela's murder, he had turned her down when she asked to come and live with him. Later, at his mother's suggestion, Dixon arrests Mildred's friend Denise on trivial drug possession charges to put pressure on Mildred. Knowing his death is imminent following the hospitalization, Willoughby spends an idyllic day with his wife, Anne, and their two daughters, then commits suicide later that night to spare his family from watching him die slowly. A distraught Dixon reacts to the news by assaulting Welby and throwing him out of a second-storey window. This is witnessed by Abercrombie, Willoughby's replacement, who fires Dixon. Before his death, Willoughby wrote several letters, including one to Mildred. Anne delivers it, interrupting an unknown man who was menacing Mildred at work. In the letter, Willoughby tells Mildred that she was not a factor in his suicide, insists that he cared about finding Angela's killer, and reveals he secretly paid to keep the billboards up another month.

After the billboards are destroyed by arson, Mildred retaliates by tossing Molotov cocktails at the police station. However, Dixon is inside reading Willoughby's letter to him, which advises him to let go of hate and embrace love if he wants to be a detective someday; he manages to escape the blaze with Angela's case file. James, an acquaintance of Mildred, happens to pass by and extinguishes Dixon's burning clothes before providing Mildred with an alibi. Dixon is put in the same hospital room as Welby, to whom he apologizes. Jerome, who was part of the team that put up the billboards, brings Mildred a set of copies and helps her restore them. Discharged from the hospital, Dixon overhears the man who menaced Mildred bragging in a bar about raping a girl in the same manner as Angela. He notes the number on the man's Idaho license plate and then scratches the man's face to get a DNA sample, passively accepting the resulting beating. Mildred is on a date with James to thank him for his help, when Charlie enters with his 19-year-old girlfriend Penelope and apologizes for burning the billboards when he was drunk. Unnerved that she retaliated against the wrong target, Mildred abruptly calls off the date, but James misinterprets her decision as embarrassment to be seen with him and leaves the restaurant incensed.

Abercrombie informs Dixon that the DNA sample is not a match and the man was overseas on military duty at the time of Angela's death. Dixon gives Mildred the disappointing news and, believing the man to be guilty of another rape, they plan a trip to Idaho to kill him. As they set out, Mildred confesses that she set the police station on fire, which Dixon had already assumed. They both express uncertainty about their mission, but Mildred says they can decide what to do along the way.

== Cast ==
- Frances McDormand as Mildred Hayes
- Woody Harrelson as Bill Willoughby
- Sam Rockwell as Jason Dixon
- Abbie Cornish as Anne Willoughby
- Lucas Hedges as Robbie Hayes
- Željko Ivanek as Cedric Connolly
- Caleb Landry Jones as Red Welby
- Clarke Peters as Abercrombie
- Samara Weaving as Penelope
- John Hawkes as Charlie Hayes
- Peter Dinklage as James
- Kerry Condon as Pamela
- Darrell Britt-Gibson as Jerome
- Kathryn Newton as Angela Hayes
- Brendan Sexton III as Crop-Haired Guy

Additionally, Amanda Warren portrays Mildred's friend Denise. Malaya Drew plays Gabriella, a local reporter, and Christopher Berry plays bar patron Tony. Jerry Winsett appears as Geoffrey, the dentist who has his thumb drilled by Mildred. Momma Dixon, Jason Dixon's mother, is portrayed by Sandy Martin. Nick Searcy makes an uncredited appearance as Father Montgomery.

== Production ==
=== Development ===
While traveling through the Southern United States c. 1998, Martin McDonagh came across a couple of accusatory billboards that alleged a woman named Kathy Page had been murdered by her husband Steve Page in Vidor, Texas, and highlighted the incompetence of the police in solving the case. McDonagh described the billboards, which he presumed had been put up by the victim's mother, as "raging and painful and tragic" and was deeply affected by them, saying the image "stayed in my mind [...] kept gnawing at me". The billboards were actually small signs that were later found along Interstate 10, and had been placed by James Fulton, whose daughter Kathy Page was assaulted and killed in 1991. This incident, combined with his desire to create strong female characters, inspired McDonagh to write the story for Three Billboards Outside Ebbing, Missouri. He said it took him about ten years to decide "it was a mother who had taken these things out. It all became fiction [...] based on a couple of actual billboards".

=== Casting ===
The character of Mildred was written with Frances McDormand in mind, and the character of Dixon was written specially for Sam Rockwell. McDormand initially felt she was older than the character as it was written and suggested Mildred be Angela's grandmother, rather than her mother, but McDonagh disagreed, feeling it would change the story too much, and eventually McDormand's husband Joel Coen persuaded her to take the part regardless.

John Wayne served as an inspiration for McDormand in her portrayal of Mildred as a protagonist in a modern-style Western, and Rockwell, wanting to make his character "the exact opposite" of Mildred, took inspiration from Lee Marvin, Wayne's co-star in The Man Who Shot Liberty Valance.

=== Filming ===
Principal photography began on May 2, 2016, in Sylva, North Carolina, and ran for 33 days. Allison Outdoor Advertising of Sylva built the billboards, which were put in a pasture near Black Mountain, North Carolina, 60 miles east of Sylva. When not filming, the billboards were usually covered because people in the area found them upsetting. David Penix of Arden, North Carolina, subsequently bought the billboards and used the wood for a roof in Douglas Lake, Tennessee, though the messages are no longer legible.

Town Pump Tavern in Black Mountain, which had been featured in The World Made Straight (2015), was closed for three days while filming took place inside. A pool table and booths were added, but the bar's actual sign appears in the film.

== Music ==
Carter Burwell's score for the film was nominated for Best Original Score at the 90th Academy Awards. It was Burwell's third collaboration with McDonagh, as he had served as composer for McDonagh's first two feature films, In Bruges (2008) and Seven Psychopaths (2012). The film also features songs by ABBA, Joan Baez, The Felice Brothers, the Four Tops, Monsters of Folk, and Townes Van Zandt.

== Release ==
Three Billboards premiered in competition at the 74th Venice International Film Festival on September 4, 2017. It was also screened at the Toronto International Film Festival, the San Sebastián International Film Festival, the BFI London Film Festival, the Zurich Film Festival, and the Mar del Plata International Film Festival, among many others.

In the United States, the film received a limited release by Fox Searchlight Pictures on November 10, 2017, in advance of its wide release on December 1. On February 27, 2018, it was released on 4K Ultra HD, Blu-ray, and DVD, with Six Shooter, McDonagh's 2004 Academy Award–winning short film, included as a bonus.

== Reception ==
=== Box office ===
The film grossed $54.5 million in the United States and Canada, and $105.7 million in other countries, for a worldwide box office total of $160.2 million.

In its limited opening weekend, the film made $322,168 from four theaters, for a per-theater average of $80,542, the fourth-best of 2017. It made $1.1 million from 53 theaters its second weekend and $4.4 million from 614 its third, finishing 9th and 10th at the box office, respectively.

The weekend following its four Golden Globe wins on January 7, 2018, the film was added to 712 theaters (for a total of 1,022) and grossed $2.3 million, an increase of 226% from the previous weekend's $706,188. Two weeks later, following the announcement of the film's seven Oscar nominations, it made $3.6 million, an increase of 87% over the previous week's $1.9 million, finishing 13th at the American box office. The weekend of March 9–11, following its two Oscar wins on March 4, the film made $705,000, down 45% from the previous weekend's $1.3 million.

=== Critical response ===
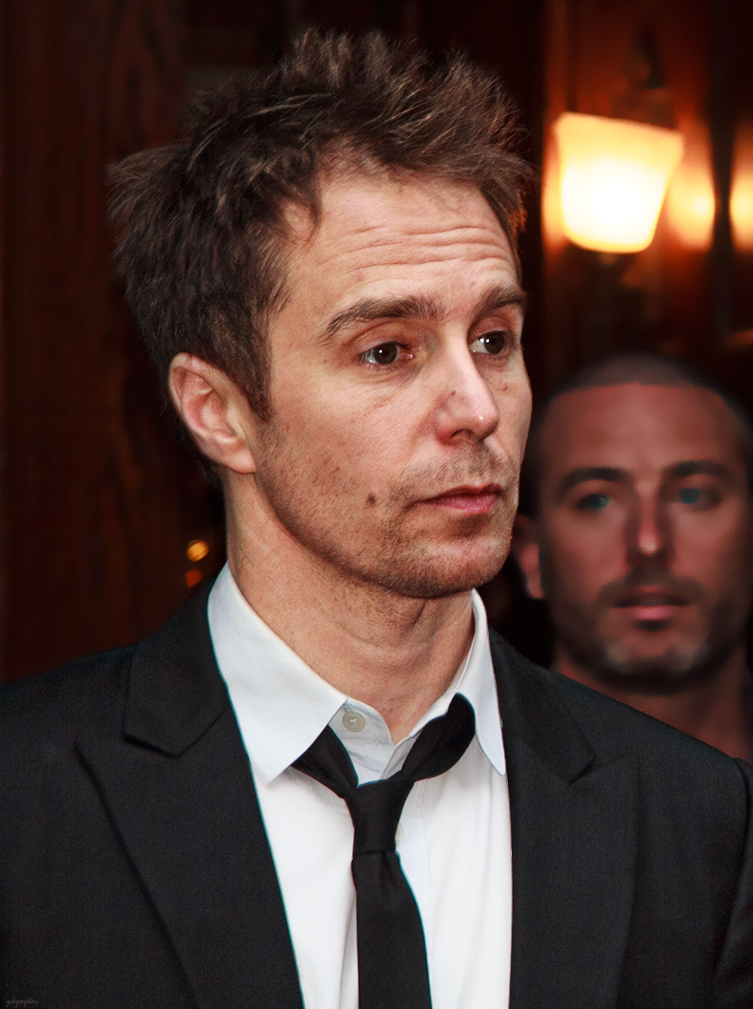
The performances of Frances McDormand and Sam Rockwell garnered widespread critical acclaim, earning them the Academy Awards for Best Actress and Best Supporting Actor respectively.

On the review aggregator website Rotten Tomatoes, 90% of 411 critics' reviews are positive, with an average rating of 8.4/10. The website's consensus reads: "Three Billboards Outside Ebbing, Missouri deftly balances black comedy against searing drama – and draws unforgettable performances from its veteran cast along the way." Metacritic, which uses a weighted average, assigned the film a score of 88 out of 100, based on 50 critics, indicating "universal acclaim".

Richard Roeper awarded the film a perfect 4-star rating, writing "We think we know these people, because the writer-director Martin McDonagh has done a masterful job with the script and with his visuals, and because the cast turns in perhaps the best ensemble work of any movie this year," concluding "Three Billboards provided some of the strongest laughs and some of the most poignant moments of heartbreak of any movie in recent memory. This is the best movie I've seen this year." Peter Travers, writing for Rolling Stone, called the film "a renegade masterpiece that will get you good", and said "by turns hellaciously hilarious and deeply sorrowful, the film hits you where it hurts."

Writing for RogerEbert.com, Brian Tallerico stated: "Three Billboards is one of those truly rare films that feels both profound and grounded; inspirational without ever manipulatively trying to be so. Very few recent movies have made me laugh and cry in equal measure as much as this one. Very few films recently are this good." Leonard Maltin was also enthusiastic, writing: "You never know what to expect, and that's one reason this film is so striking. The small-town setting feels real, and so do most of the characters. Sometimes I wish McDonough’s [sic] world view wasn't quite so twisted, but he's never dull and he showed great wisdom in casting McDormand in the leading role. She is incapable of striking a false note, and that more than anything else is what makes Three Billboards a must-see."

In a review for Variety, Owen Gleiberman described the film as a dark, morally ambiguous drama centered on grief, anger, and justice. He praised Frances McDormand's performance as the film's driving force, while noting that the film operates as a stylized, theatrical narrative that explores shifting moral perspectives rather than offering a clear resolution. Steve Pond, writing for TheWrap, described the film as a darkly comic drama that balances violence and humor. He praised Frances McDormand's performance as a central strength of the film, while noting that "after an unexpected twist halfway through the film, the pacing slackens and McDonagh struggles to keep the story on track as the violence escalates to ludicrous levels".

Other reviews were more critical; Vox summarized that the film "went from film fest darling to awards-season controversy". In a review for The New York Times, columnist Wesley Morris argued that the film presents an unconvincing and stylized depiction of the United States. He criticized McDonagh's handling of violence, race, and social themes, suggesting that the film relies on contrived storytelling and tonal inconsistency rather than offering meaningful insight into American society. Manohla Dargis, also writing for The New York Times, described the film as an uneven film that blends comedy and violence while exploring grief and vengeance. She praised Frances McDormand's performance, though she argued that McDonagh's tonal shifts and thematic ideas sometimes feel forced or overly constructed. In The New Yorker, Tim Parks praised the film's "magnificently photographed images", but wrote that the plot contained "a thousand cheap coincidences", and concluded that the film is "empty of emotional intelligence" and "devoid of any remotely honest observation of the society it purports to serve".

Some took issue with the film's handling of racial themes, particularly surrounding the redemptive arc of Officer Dixon, whose alleged torturing of an African American prisoner before the events of the film is referred to several times. In The Daily Beast, podcaster Ira Madison III described the treatment of Rockwell's character as "altogether offensive [...] McDonagh's attempts to script the black experience in America are often fumbling and backward and full of outdated tropes." Alyssa Rosenberg noted in The Washington Post that the film is dramatically uneven and undermined by the redemption arc of the racist police officer Dixon, played by Sam Rockwell. She contended that the film's attempt to morally rehabilitate the character weakens its narrative structure and limits its exploration of racism and justice in the fictional town. Ira Madison III also critiqued the film by highlighting Mcdonagh's "overall outsider perspective toward race in America and the casual racism that permeates the fictional Midwest town".

Focusing on the film's treatment of sexual violence, Oliver Kenny pointed out that the film is unusual for not foregrounding images of the rape victim, and welcomed the shift from a focus on the rape itself to how the community handles rape, however poorly or mishandled their approach may be. Kenny argues that the film avoids "pursuing eye-for-an-eye revenge narratives as a crowd-pleasing solution and without pandering to a black-and-white narrative of evil-doing perpetrators, angelic victims and innocent bystanders".

=== Accolades ===
At the 75th Golden Globe Awards, Three Billboards won Best Motion Picture – Drama, Best Actress – Drama (McDormand), Best Supporting Actor (Rockwell), and Best Screenplay, and it was also nominated for Best Director and Best Original Score. The film was nominated in nine categories at the 71st British Academy Film Awards and won five awards: both Best Film and Outstanding British Film (making it and The King's Speech (2010) the only films to win both awards since the latter category was reintroduced in 1992), Best Leading Actress (McDormand), Best Supporting Actor (Rockwell), and Best Screenplay (Original). At the 24th Screen Actors Guild Awards, the film was nominated for four awards and won three, including Outstanding Performance by a Cast in a Motion Picture. It was nominated for six awards at the 23rd Critics' Choice Awards and won three, including Best Acting Ensemble. At the 90th Academy Awards, the film received seven nominations, including for Best Picture, Best Actress (McDormand), Best Supporting Actor (both Rockwell and Harrelson), and Best Original Screenplay, and McDormand and Rockwell took home their respective awards.

The film was named one of the top 10 films of the year by the American Film Institute. It won the top prize, the People's Choice Award, at the 2017 Toronto International Film Festival, and won the Audience Award at the 2017 San Sebastián International Film Festival.

In 2021, members of Writers Guild of America West (WGAW) and Writers Guild of America, East (WGAE) voted its screenplay 80th in WGA's 101 Greatest Screenplays of the 21st Century (so far). In 2025, it was one of the films voted for the "Readers' Choice" edition of The New York Times' list of "The 100 Best Movies of the 21st Century," finishing at number 181.

== Impact ==
Signs inspired by the billboards in the film have been used in protests by numerous groups around the world. Both McDonagh and McDormand have responded positively to this, with McDonagh saying that "You couldn't ask for anything more than for an angry film to be adopted by protests," and McDormand saying she is "thrilled that activists all over the world have been inspired by the set decoration of the three billboards in Martin's film."

- On February 3, 2018, a mural was erected outside Bristol city centre in England depicting three billboards like those in the film, which read: "Our NHS is dying", "And still no more funding", "How come, Mrs May". It was installed by the groups People's Republic of Stokes Croft and Protect Our NHS in response to the alleged privatization of the National Health Service (NHS) and the death of a 15-year-old girl that the coroner attributed to neglect caused by a lack of NHS resources and care.
- On February 15, 2018, Justice4Grenfell, an advocacy group created in response to the Grenfell Tower fire, hired three vans with electronic screens to protest perceived inaction in response to the fire the previous June. The vans were driven around London and displayed messages in the style of the billboards in the film: "71 Dead", "And Still No Arrests?", "How Come?".
- On the night of February 15, 2018, the movement #OccupyJustice set up three billboards and a number of banners in Malta to mark the four-month anniversary of the murder of journalist Daphne Caruana Galizia. The billboards bore the text: "A Journalist Killed. No Justice.", "A Country Robbed. No Justice.", "No Resignations. No Justice.". The authorities removed the billboards the following day, stating that they were illegal. The government was criticized for this move, and a day after their removal, activists laid down banners with similar text near Auberge de Castille, the office of the Prime Minister.
- In response to the Stoneman Douglas High School shooting that took place on February 14, 2018, in Parkland, Florida, activist group Avaaz had three vans circle Florida senator Marco Rubio's offices displaying: "Slaughtered in School", "And Still No Gun Control?", "How Come, Marco Rubio?".

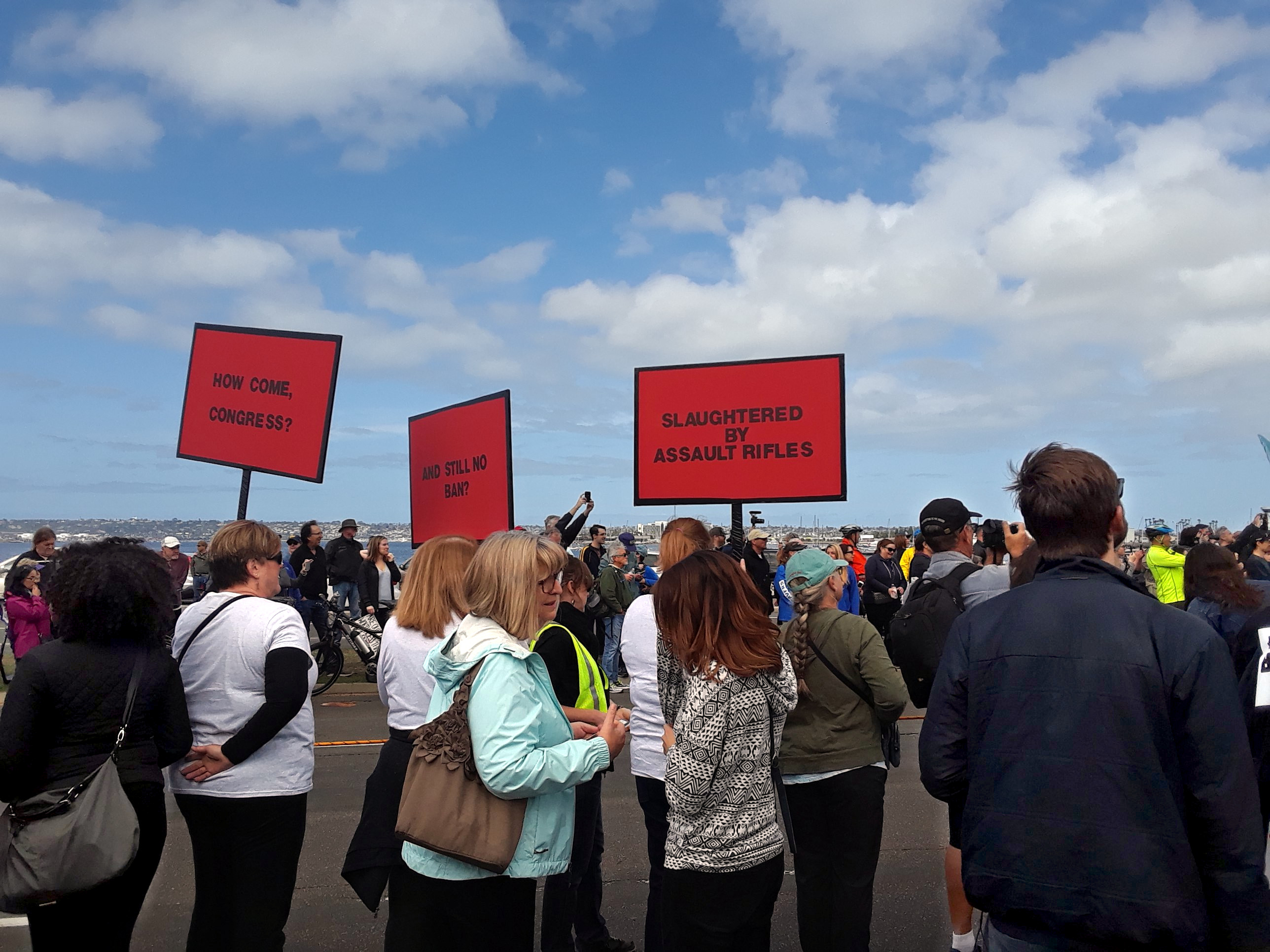
March 24, 2018: March for Our Lives demonstrators in San Diego

- On February 22, 2018, the Union of Medical Care and Relief Organizations, protesting the inaction of the UN in response to the Syrian Civil War, set up three billboards outside the United Nations building in New York that read: "500,000 Dead in Syria", "And still no action?", "How come, Security Council".
- Shortly before the 90th Academy Awards ceremony (on or around March 1, 2018), conservative street artist Sabo set up three billboards in Los Angeles, stating: "We all knew and still no arrests", "And the Oscar for Biggest Pedophile goes to...", "Name names on stage or shut the hell up!"
- On International Women's Day 2018 (March 8), three billboards were put in downtown Pristina, Kosovo, to protest the death of two women as a result of domestic violence.
- On March 24, 2018, signs inspired by Three Billboards appeared at March for Our Lives gun control rallies across the U.S. and around the world.
- In January 2019, Chinese artist Wu Qiong and a gay policeman launched a public protest campaign in which bright-red trucks bearing slogans denouncing homosexual "conversion therapy" were paraded through several major cities in China, including Shanghai, Beijing, and Nanjing.
- Around June 2022, three red banners were hung at Izmaylovsky Park in Moscow protesting the Russian invasion of Ukraine.
