= Awoken (film) =

- Directed by: Daniel J. Phillips
- Written by: Daniel J. Phillips; Alan Grace
- Cinematography: Michael Tessari
- Edited by: Sean Lahiff
- Music by: Christopher Larkin
- Release date: 2019
- Running time: 87 minutes
- Country: Australia
- Language: English

Awoken is a 2019 Australian horror film that was directed by Daniel J. Phillips, who co-wrote the script with Alan Grace. The film stars Sara West as a young medical student trying to save her insomnia plagued brother from sinister forces.

== Synopsis ==
Karla is a med student whose brother Blake developed a rare disorder, Fatal Familial Insomnia (FFI), after witnessing their parents die in a murder-suicide. She is also suffering from insomnia. Not wanting to lose her brother, Karla readily agrees when her instructor Robert proposes that they try to save Blake using a secret and highly illegal sleep lab that he has been holding in an unused and forgotten basement of the medical campus. Robert discovered the lab alongside Karla's father while they were exploring the building. The two used the lab to conduct a sleep study in hopes of curing Sarah, Karla and Blake's mother. Once there they are introduced to the two other participants Chris and Angela, who also suffer from insomnia due to their own ailments, severe sleep apnea and night terrors, respectively. To her displeasure, Karla's ex-boyfriend Patrick is allowed to accompany them as a pharmacist, despite her anger at him deserting her when she was trying to help Blake's FFI.

While searching for potential cures Karla and her friend Alice discover a hidden room, where they find a video camera, VHS tapes, and a journal. The tapes contain footage of her mother's sleep trial, which was overseen by her father, Robert, and a Catholic priest. As she views the footage Karla sees her mother show strange and seemingly demonic behaviors. Blake performs identical behaviors, including him ripping pages from a Bible. This frightens Angela, who begs Karla to help her escape. Karla later watches Angela enter a trance and commit suicide. After the death Robert claims that the trials will end, however when they try to leave the group discovers that they are locked in and cannot leave until the next day. Karla reconnects with Patrick, who she successfully persuades to also watch the tapes. Meanwhile Alice, who has been reading the journal, discovers that Karla's mother was possessed by Iddimu, a demon who went after people with insomnia.

The journal also notes that God created sleep in order to keep the demon at bay. Karla continues watching the tapes with Patrick and the two watch footage revealing that Robert knew about the demon and that the priest hid the tapes in hopes of the truth coming to light, as well as to serve as a warning. The two are unable to warn Alice in time, as the demon possesses and makes Alice kill herself. The demon also murders the other sleep participant, Chris.

Unwilling to leave her brother behind, Karla decides to exorcise the demon from Blake. Her attempt is interrupted by Robert, who kills Patrick and knocks Karla unconscious. She awakens in a candle filled room where Robert reveals that he wants to summon the demon because he views it as his savior. As a boy he was repeatedly sexually and physically assaulted by his guardian. The demon possessed another boy in the home and killed the guardian. The boy then committed suicide before the demon could harm anyone else. Despite his attempts to free the demon, Robert was repeatedly unsuccessful until Blake began suffering from insomnia. Karla is able to resume the exorcism, however Robert tries to assume control over the demon. This angers Iddimu, who forces Robert to kill himself. Karla pleads for Blake to fight the demon, giving him the energy to expel Iddimu. The demon appears as a ghostly spectre that disappears into the ground. The two make it to a hospital, where Karla is shown unable to sleep, implying that she is at risk of becoming possessed by Iddimu.

== Cast ==
- Sara West as Karla
- Erik Thomson as Robert
- Benson Jack Anthony as Blake
- Matt Crook as Patrick
- Berynn Schwerdt as Earl
- Amelia Douglass as Alice
- Melanie Munt as Sarah
- Mark Saturno as Sangermano
- Adam Ovadia as Chris
- Alexander Lloyd as Bazelli
- Felicia Tassone as Angela

== Development ==
Director Daniel J. Phillips drew inspiration for the film's premise from the creepypasta "The Russian Sleep Experiment", in which sleep deprivation features predominantly. Other influences on the film included The Exorcist and The Conjuring films. Grace was chosen as a co-writer due to his experience writing scripts set in claustrophobic, limited settings. Sara West was brought on to portray the lead character Karla and Erik Thomson was announced as one of her co-stars. Filming took place at Hendon Studios in Adelaide, Australia during 2018.

During the editing process Phillips and editor Sean Lahiff chose to restructure the lead in order to make it more clear that Karla was a student doctor, as they had previously introduced her as a doctor, causing confusion with viewers.

== Release ==
Awoken was first released in 2019 and by 2021 had been distributed in 32 territories all over the world. It screened at the 2020 Horror on Sea Film Festival and was released to VOD through Vertical Entertainment on May 8, 2020.

== Reception ==
Surgeons of Horror said "Some of the effects are a bit tried and tested, falling into the fairly predictable terrain, but Director Daniel J. Phillips has carefully positioned the audience into a false sense of security and then dialling up the entertainment level, whilst spinning a strong thriller that poses all the right questions towards a highly amped ending. Surprisingly good and well worth checking out." Horror Society rated Awoken at 2.5/5, as they felt that the "story for this one is very interesting and has a lot of promise but it’s very predictable and the ending is very drab." HorrorNews.net was more favorable, stating "If you are looking for the type of horror entry that de-emphasizes gore and quick-cut editing in favor of a solid script that is happily light on dialogue at times, a solid cast, and a director skilled at bringing it all together neatly, Awoken just might be the fare for you."
