= Samara Weaving =

Australian actress and model

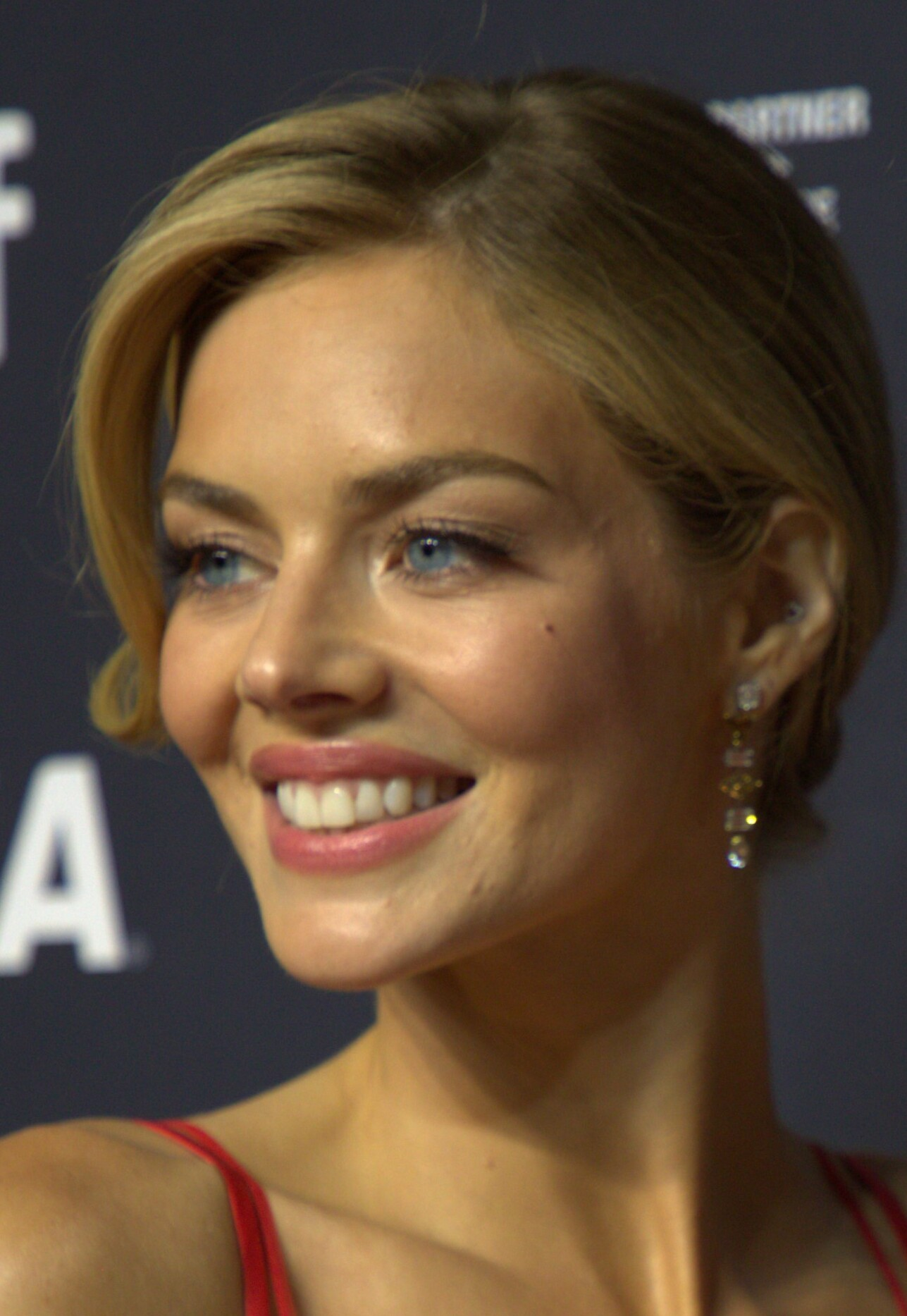
- Weaving at the 2025 TIFF
- Born: Adelaide, Australia
- Occupations: Actress; model
- Years active: 2004–present
- Spouse: Jimmy Warden (m. 2019)
- Children: 1
- Relatives: Hugo Weaving (uncle); Harry Greenwood (cousin)

Samara Weaving is an Australian actress and model. She began her career in Australian television with starring roles in the series Out of the Blue (2008) and the soap opera Home and Away (2009–2013), before making her film debut in the crime film Mystery Road (2013).

Weaving gained wide recognition as a scream queen, starring in the horror films Mayhem (2017), The Babysitter (2017), Ready or Not (2019), The Babysitter: Killer Queen (2020), Scream VI (2023), and Ready or Not 2: Here I Come (2026). Further projects include the drama film Three Billboards Outside Ebbing, Missouri (2017), the comedy films Bill & Ted Face the Music (2020) and The Valet (2022), and the thriller films Carolina Caroline (2025), and Over Your Dead Body (2026).

== Early life and education ==
Samara Weaving was born to Simon Weaving—a filmmaker and lecturer at the University of Newcastle in Newcastle, New South Wales and artistic director of the Canberra International Film Festival—and Helena Bezzina, an art therapist who teaches museum studies at the University of Newcastle. She grew up in Australia, Singapore, Fiji, and Indonesia. Her younger sister, Morgan, is also an actress; their uncle is actor Hugo Weaving.

Weaving and her family moved to Canberra in 2005 and she attended Canberra Girls Grammar School. She became vice drama captain and appeared in various school and theatre productions. Weaving later said that watching Pirates of the Caribbean in Malta at age 12 inspired her to get into acting; according to the Australian Daily Telegraph in 2013, Weaving was rumoured to have been shortlisted for a role in Pirates of the Caribbean: Dead Men Tell No Tales.

== Career ==
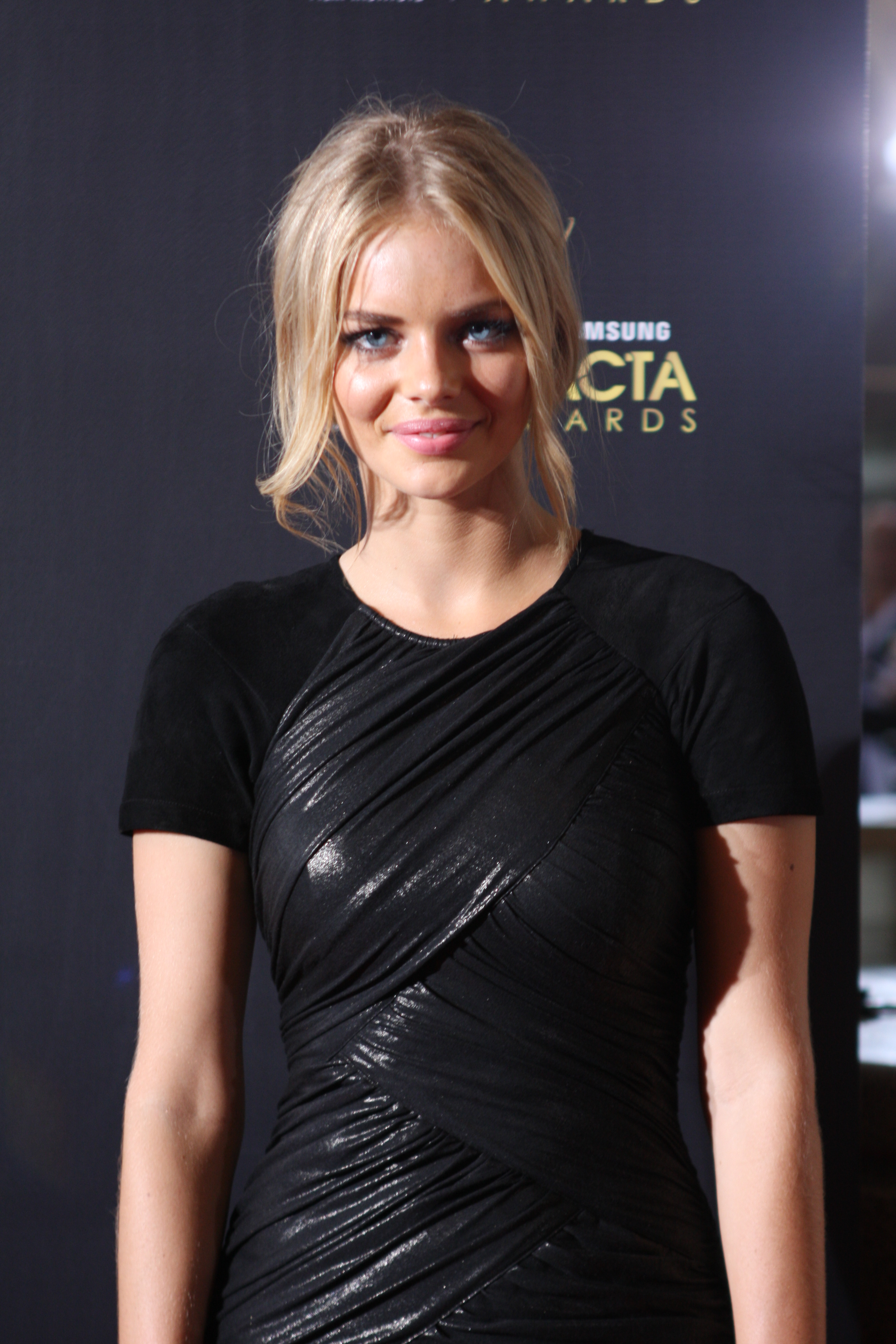
Weaving at the AACTA Awards in 2012

Weaving made her screen debut in 2008, being cast as Kirsten Mulroney in the Australian soap opera Out of the Blue when she was 16. The series was well received, but it was not commissioned for a second season. She then relocated from Canberra to Sydney to play Indigo "Indi" Walker in the Australian soap opera Home and Away. While initially cast in a recurring capacity, she was later brought into the main cast, playing the character from 2009-2013. Weaving described the experience as difficult, comparing it to a "machine." She was nominated for Best Female Performance at the AACTA Awards in 2012. Weaving began modelling for Australian underwear brand Bonds in 2012. In 2013, Weaving appeared in the crime film Mystery Road, alongside her uncle Hugo. She played the recurring role of Heather in the comedy horror series Ash vs Evil Dead in 2015, earning attention after a picture of her in a make-up test was used in a hoax. Also in 2015, she appeared in the comedy web series Squirrel Boys. The following year, she appeared in the action comedy Monster Trucks as Brianne. She was cast in the film during her first trip to Los Angeles in 2014.

In 2017, Weaving starred in the action comedy-thriller Mayhem, which saw her co-star with Steven Yeun and playing the role of Melanie Cross. Brian Tallerico of RogerEbert.com compared her to Margot Robbie and called her "captivating and a little scary at the same time". She also played the girlfriend of John Hawkes in the film Three Billboards Outside Ebbing, Missouri, for which she was nominated for numerous awards with the acting ensemble and the title character in the comedy-horror film The Babysitter. She also appeared in the music video for Charlie Puth's song "Attention." From 2017-2019, she played Nelson Rose in the Showtime series SMILF. In December 2018, it was announced that Weaving was leaving the show after the second season. Weaving asked to be released from her contract after making a complaint about having to perform a nude sex scene. Daniel Holloway of Variety reported that Weaving felt uncomfortable with the behaviour of show creator and co-star Frankie Shaw during a similar sex scene in the first season, leading to an investigation of alleged misconduct by Shaw, which found that there was no wrongdoing on Shaw's part, however the show was cancelled shortly after by Showtime. Also in 2018, Weaving appeared in the Picnic at Hanging Rock miniseries as one of three students who disappear during a school trip to the titular Hanging Rock.

Weaving next starred as Grace in the 2019 comedy-horror film Ready or Not, her first leading role in a theatrical American film. The film marks her first collaboration with directors Matt Bettinelli-Olpin and Tyler Gillett, who described her as "just one of those people that we'll be friends with forever. She's one of our favorites." The film and her performance received positive reviews and helped to establish her as a scream queen. Jeannette Catsoulis of The New York Times called her "fantastic" and wrote that she "gives heart to this efficiently blood-drenched harpooning of soul-sucking greed and inbred family values." Simran Hans of The Guardian believed that her performance would earn a cult following. Also in 2019, she starred alongside Daniel Radcliffe in the action comedy Guns Akimbo.

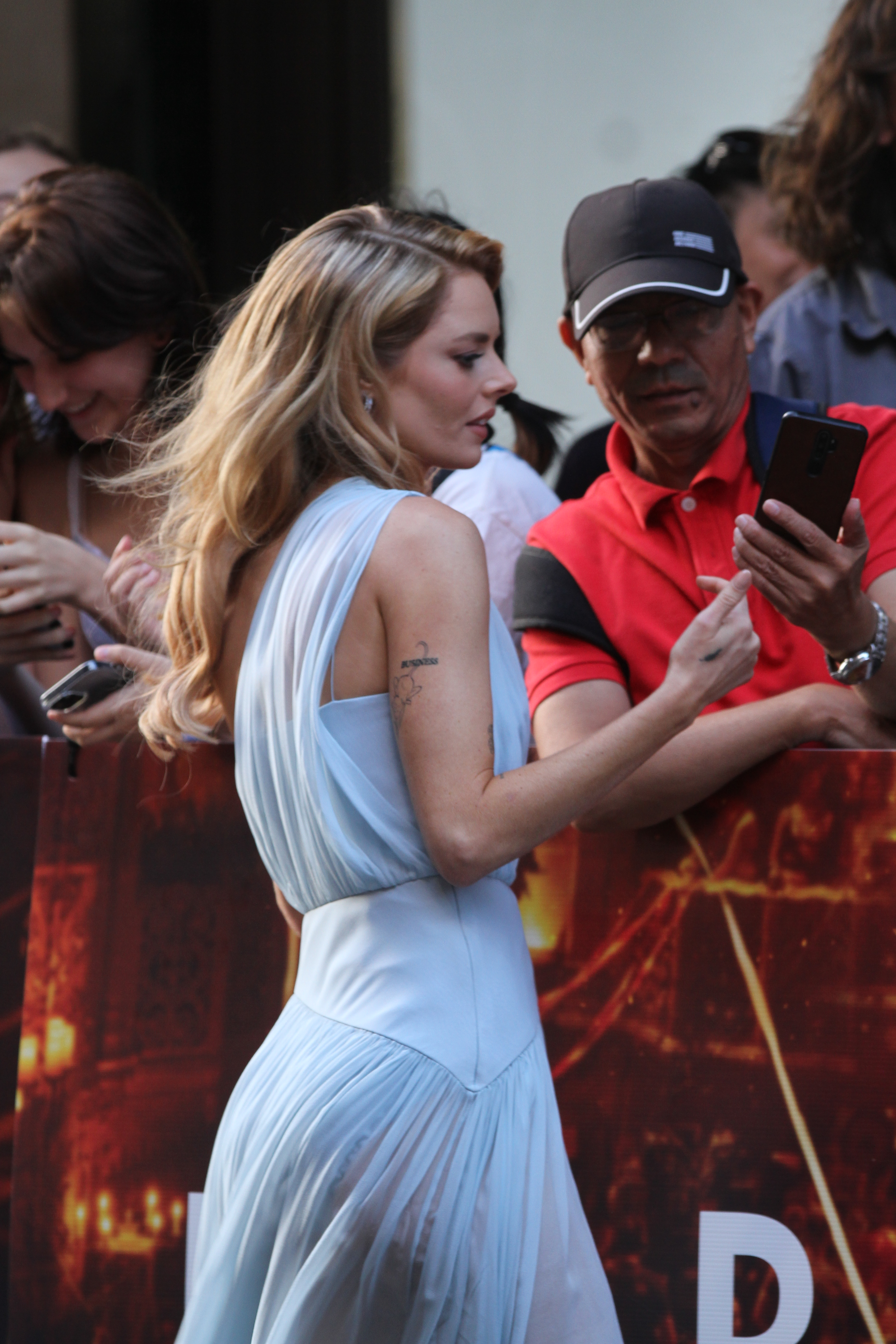
Weaving at the State Theatre in 2023, greeting fans at the premiere of Babylon

In 2020, Weaving headlined the drama thriller Last Moment of Clarity, reprised her titular role in The Babysitter: Killer Queen and appeared in the science-fiction comedy Bill & Ted Face the Music. She also starred in Ryan Murphy’s Netflix miniseries Hollywood as Claire Wood, the love interest of lead David Corenswet. The next year, she played Scarlett in the G.I. Joe spinoff Snake Eyes and Jessica in the Hulu drama series Nine Perfect Strangers, based on the novel of the same name by Liane Moriarty. Also in 2021, she was cast in the action comedy film Boy Kills World, but exited the project due to scheduling conflicts and was replaced by Jessica Rothe. In 2022, Weaving starred alongside Eugenio Derbez in the romantic comedy The Valet, a remake of the 2006 French film of the same name. Also in 2022, she played Constance Moore in Damien Chazelle's polarizing period drama film Babylon and Marie-Josephine de Montalembert in the biographical film Chevalier. That same year, she joined the cast of Scream VI. Her second film with Bettinelli-Olpin and Gillett, it was released theatrically in March 2023 and became the highest-grossing film of its franchise.

Weaving was announced in 2022 to lead the action horror film Azrael as the titular character. It premiered at South by Southwest in March 2024 and was released in theatres and on Shudder in September. Also in 2024, she had a voice role in the Australian film 200% Wolf. Weaving starred in and executive produced the Netflix pilot Little Sky in 2023, which ultimately did not go to series. She was also cast in Jimmy Warden's comedy-thriller Borderline, Adam Leon's biopic Liz and an unnamed limited television series based on the Holly Madison memoir Down the Rabbit Hole: Curious Adventures and Cautionary Tales of a Former Playboy Bunny. She reprised the role of Grace in Ready or Not 2: Here I Come, and star in the Prime Video horror-comedy Over Your Dead Body, an English-language remake of the Norwegian thriller I Onde Dager.

In 2025, Weaving starred in the thriller Borderline as Sofia, a 1990s pop star targeted by an obsessive fan, combining vulnerability and dark comedy in a performance that anchored the film's heightened premise. She later appeared in the action comedy Eenie Meanie as a former getaway driver. Despite never having driven a car before filming, she prepared for the role by learning to drive and studying driving techniques. She starred in the crime thriller Carolina Caroline as Caroline Daniels, portraying a young woman whose relationship with a charismatic criminal draws her into a dangerous life of crime. In July 2026, Weaving was cast to play Emma Frost in the upcoming untitled X-Men film produced by Marvel Studios, set in the Marvel Cinematic Universe (MCU).

== Public image ==
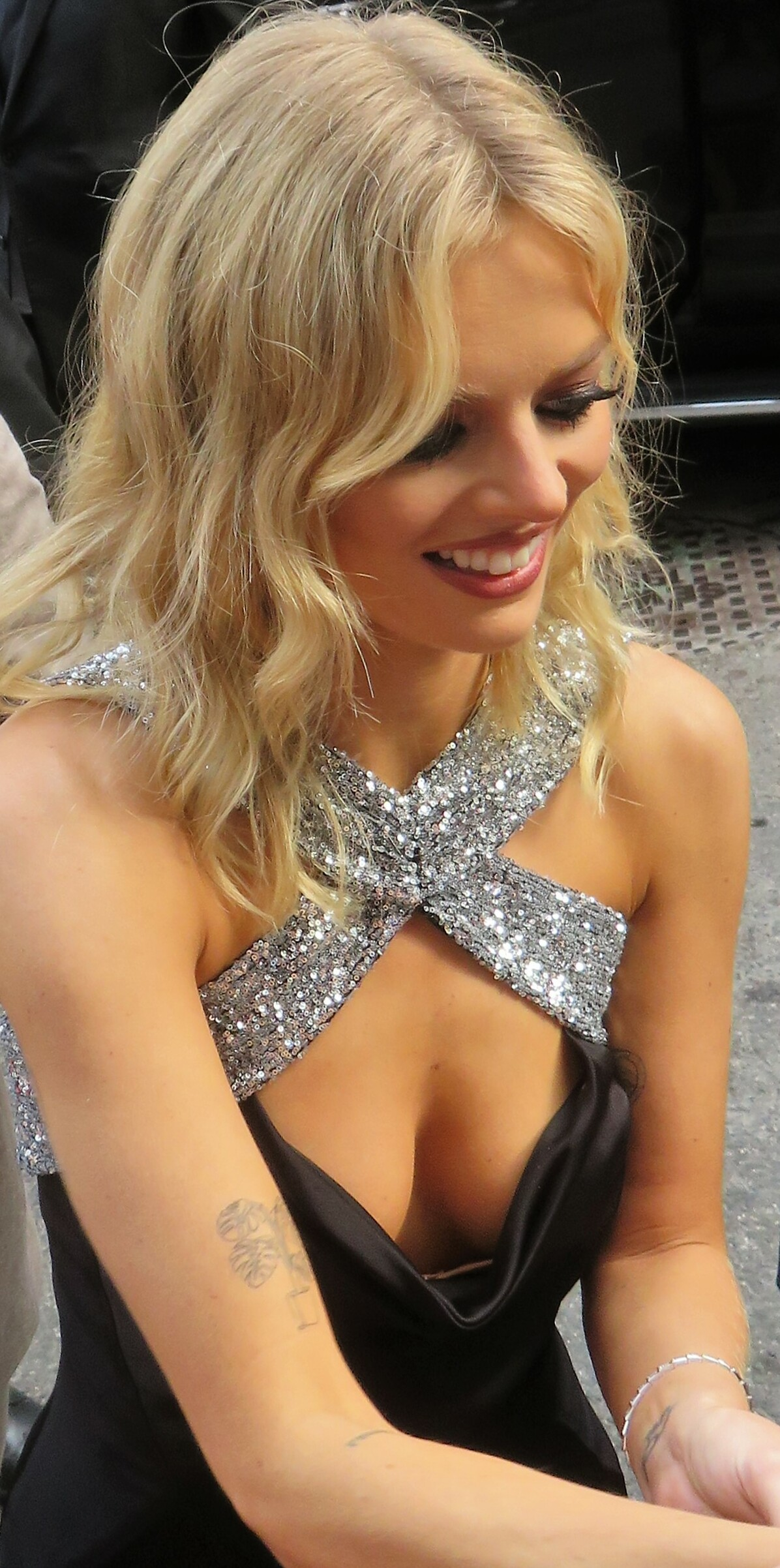
Weaving signs autographs for fans during the premiere of Chevalier in 2022.

Throughout her career, Weaving has starred in various film genres, primarily horror films, including Ready or Not, Mayhem, The Babysitter, The Babysitter: Killer Queen, Scream VI, Azrael and Ready or Not 2: Here I Come; consequently, she became known as a scream queen. Filmmakers Tyler Gillett and Matt Bettinelli-Olpin, who directed her in Ready or Not, Ready or Not II: Here I Come and Scream VI, stated that Weaving is "one of our favorites" and her presence in Scream VI inspired them to "have fun with her role" and use the "level of excitement [from the fandom] surrounding her involvement [in the film]," declaring that "she has the best scream in the world!" Kevin McCall of Collider stated that "Weaving continues to solidify herself as an icon of the [horror] genre".

In 2019, analysing Weaving's career path for The Sydney Morning Herald, Elaine Lipworth wrote that she "is rapidly gaining a reputation as one of Hollywood's most exciting young talents". Weaving has appeared in magazines such as Harper's Bazaar Australia and Women's Health Australia.

== Personal life ==
Weaving has been in a relationship with writer Jimmy Warden since meeting him on the set of The Babysitter. They announced their engagement on 10 March 2019 and married that same year. As her film career flourished, she relocated to Los Angeles. In December 2025, Weaving announced she was pregnant with her first child. Weaving gave birth to a daughter in 2026.

Weaving is a lifelong Harry Potter fan with the Deathly Hallows symbol tattooed on her ankle and took the role in the 2019 film Guns Akimbo just so that she could work with actor Daniel Radcliffe. Weaving also told versions of a story where she hid the tattoo from Radcliffe by wearing long socks and pretending she could not remember his name. When Radcliffe spotted the tattoo and recognized the symbol, he asked if it was a Potter tattoo and Weaving's save was to insist it was about the books and author J. K. Rowling, not him.

She is also an avid video game enthusiast, as she discussed in a promotional interview for Ready or Not II: Here I Come, having expressed her interest in several gaming franchises, including Assassin's Creed, Red Dead Redemption 2, Hogwarts Legacy, Mortal Kombat and Street Fighter. She has also stated that she takes her PlayStation 5 with her while travelling and played the Gran Turismo series to prepare for her role as a getaway driver in the film Eenie Meanie (2025). She also expressed her love for the Nintendo character Yoshi.

== Filmography ==
=== Film ===
Key
†	Denotes films that have not yet been released

List of film appearances, with year, title, role(s), notes and reference(s) shown
Year	Title	Role	Notes	Ref.
2009	Sprung	Fran	Short film	
2009	Steps	Herself	Short film; also director and writer	
2013	Mystery Road	Peggy		
2014	Growing Young	Minks	Short film	
2014	Flex Off 2014	Herself	Documentary film	
2015	He Who Has It All	Serena	Short film	
2016	Bad Girl	Chloe Buchanan / Jessica Cooper		
2016	Monster Trucks	Brianne		
2017	Mayhem	Melanie Cross		
2017	Three Billboards Outside Ebbing, Missouri	Penelope		
2017	The Babysitter	Bee		
2019	Ready or Not	Grace Le Domas (née MacCaullay)		
2019	Guns Akimbo	Nix Degraves		
2020	100% Wolf	Batty	Voice role	
2020	Last Moment of Clarity	Georgia Outerbridge / Lauren Clerk		
2020	Bill & Ted Face the Music	Theodora "Thea" Preston		
2020	The Babysitter: Killer Queen	Bee		
2021	Snake Eyes	Shana O'Hara / Scarlett		
2022	The Valet	Olivia Allan		
2022	Chevalier	Marie-Josephine de Montalembert		
2022	Babylon	Constance Moore		
2023	Scream VI	Laura Crane		
2023	La Snob	Marguerite de La Rocque	Short film; also producer	
2024	Azrael	Azrael		
2024	200% Wolf	Batty	Voice role	
2025	Borderline	Sofia Minor		
2025	Eenie Meanie	Edie Meaney / Eenie Meanie		
2025	Carolina Caroline	Caroline Daniels		
2026	Ready or Not 2: Here I Come	Grace MacCaullay	Also executive producer	
2026	Over Your Dead Body	Lisa Burton		
2027	Naughty †		Filming	

=== Television ===
List of television appearances, with year, title, role(s), notes and reference shown
Year	Title	Role	Notes	Ref.
2008	Out of the Blue	Kirsten Mulroney	Main role; 50 episodes	
2009–2013	Home and Away	Indi Walker	Main role; 340 episodes	
2011	1st AACTA Awards	Herself (presenter)	Television special	
2015	Squirrel Boys	Kelly	Web series; 4 episodes	
2015–2016	Ash vs Evil Dead	Heather	Recurring role; 3 episodes (season 1)	
2017–2019	SMILF	Nelson Rose	Main role; 13 episodes	
2018	Picnic at Hanging Rock	Irma Leopold	Miniseries; 6 episodes	
2020	Hollywood	Claire Wood	Miniseries; 7 episodes	
2021	No Activity	Sue	Voice role; 5 episodes (season 4)	
2021	Nine Perfect Strangers	Jessica Chandler	Main role; 8 episodes (season 1)	
2024	Little Sky	Penelope Paul Porter	Unaired television pilot (also executive producer)	

=== Music videos ===
List of music video appearances, with year, title, role(s), notes and reference shown
Year	Title	Artist	Role(s)	Notes	Ref.
2017	"Attention"	Charlie Puth		Guest appearance	
2026	"Crazy, Baby"	Cara Delevingne	Love interest		

== Awards and nominations ==
Awards and nominations received by Samara Weaving
Association	Year (Note: Indicates the year of ceremony. Each year is linked to the article about the awards held that year, wherever possible.)	Category	Work	Result	Refs.
AACTA Awards	2011	Best Female Performance	Home and Away	Nominated	
Critics' Choice Awards	2018	Best Acting Ensemble	Three Billboards Outside Ebbing, Missouri	Won	
Detroit Film Critics Society	2017	Best Ensemble	Three Billboards Outside Ebbing, Missouri	Nominated	
Equity Ensemble Awards	2013	Outstanding Performance by an Ensemble in a Drama Series	Home and Away	Nominated	
Equity Ensemble Awards	2014	Outstanding Performance by an Ensemble in a Drama Series	Home and Away	Nominated	
Equity Ensemble Awards	2019	Outstanding Performance by an Ensemble in a TV Movie or Miniseries	Picnic at Hanging Rock	Nominated	
Fangoria Chainsaw Awards	2020	Best Actress	Ready or Not	Nominated	
Film Critics Circle of Australia Awards	2017	Best Actress	Bad Girl	Nominated	
Florida Film Critics Circle Awards	2017	Best Cast	Three Billboards Outside Ebbing, Missouri	Won	
Florida Film Critics Circle Awards	2022	Best Cast	Babylon	Runner-up	
Fright Meter Awards	2019	Best Actress in a Leading Role	Ready or Not	Won	
Georgia Film Critics Association Awards	2018	Best Ensemble	Three Billboards Outside Ebbing, Missouri	Won	
HNiD Awards	2020	Best Actress	Ready or Not	Nominated	
IGN Summer Movie Awards	2019	Best Lead Performer in a Movie	Ready or Not	Nominated	
Online Film Critics Society Awards	2017	Best Ensemble	Three Billboards Outside Ebbing, Missouri	Won	
San Diego Film Critics Society Awards	2017	Best Performance by an Ensemble	Three Billboards Outside Ebbing, Missouri	Nominated	
Screen Actors Guild Awards	2018	Outstanding Performance by a Cast in a Motion Picture	Three Billboards Outside Ebbing, Missouri	Won	
Seattle Film Critics Society Awards	2018	Best Ensemble Cast	Three Billboards Outside Ebbing, Missouri	Nominated	
Washington D.C. Area Film Critics Association Awards	2017	Best Ensemble	Three Billboards Outside Ebbing, Missouri	Won	
