= Jon Gregory (film editor) =

British film editor (1944–2021)

Jon Henry Albert Gregory (21 May 1944 – 9 September 2021) was a British film editor. He was born in Lahore, British Raj to British parents, and raised in England from the age of nine, where he was educated at Reigate Grammar School.

He worked at the BBC as a crew member, and began his editing career with Ealing Studios. His credits included Shoestring (1981), A Year in Provence (1994), Deeply (2000), The Proposition, (2005), In Bruges (2008), and Three Billboards Outside Ebbing, Missouri (2017) for which he received an Academy Award for Best Film Editing nomination at the 90th Academy Awards.

Gregory was previously nominated for the BAFTA Award for Best Editing for Four Weddings and a Funeral (1994). He was a member of the American Cinema Editors.

Gregory married Beryl Ridley from 1966 until their divorce. They had two daughters. In about 1980, he began a relationship with Sue Barker, his former assistant and dubbing editor, and they married in 2020. He died on 9 September 2021, at the age of 77, after a short illness. The 2022 film The Banshees of Inisherin is dedicated to his memory.

== See also ==
- List of film director and editor collaborations - Gregory edited films with director Mike Leigh for more than 30 years, commencing with High Hopes (1988) and ending with Peterloo (2018). Secrets & Lies (1996) received Oscar and BAFTA nominations for best picture and for best directing.
