= Faustus (play) =

- Original language: English
- Written by: David Mamet
- Genre: Drama

Premiere
- Date: March 2004
- Place: San Francisco
- Directed by: David Mamet

Faustus is a two act play by David Mamet that had its world premiere in San Francisco's Magic Theatre in March 2004, directed by Mamet. It is a contemporary version of the Faust legend.

== Plot ==
In this version, Faustus is a married young scientist and philosopher with a child in the 1900s. However, after his latest work is slammed by critics, he makes a demonic deal with a bizarre party entertainer, 'Magus'.

== Reception ==
Variety's Dennis Harvey wrote a negative review, criticizing the dialogue, lack of emotion and staging, saying, "Those who suspect Mamet the director is far from Mamet the writer’s best interpreter will find that notion amply supported here. Even allowing for the lumpy prose, which would sap energy under any circumstances, the physical production is remarkably stilted."
