= Don't Tell (2017 film) =

- Theatrical film poster
- Directed by: Tori Garrett
- Screenplay by: Anne Brooksbank; Ursula Cleary; James Greville
- Produced by: Scott Corfield
- Starring: Jack Thompson; Aden Young; Sara West; Rachel Griffiths
- Cinematography: Mark Wareham
- Edited by: Peter Carrodus
- Music by: Bryony Marks
- Release date: 18 May 2017
- Running time: 110 minutes
- Country: Australia
- Language: English

Don't Tell is a May 2017 Australian drama film directed by Tori Garrett and starring Jack Thompson, Aden Young and Sara West. It was based on the 2017 novel of the same name by solicitor Stephen Roche.

The basis of the film has been paralleled with the film Spotlight, based on the Boston systematic child sexual abuse by a religious institution. The Missy Higgins song "Torchlight" was composed for the film.

== Plot synopsis ==
Don't Tell is based on the true story of Lyndal, a young woman who had been sexually abused at a prestigious private school and, with the help of a determined lawyer, sued the powerful church that denied her abuse for ten years.

== Cast ==
- Jack Thompson as Bob Myers, trial counsel
- Sara West as Lyndal, victim
- Aden Young as Stephen Roche, solicitor
- Rachel Griffiths as Joy Conolly, psychologist
- Jacqueline McKenzie as Jean Dalton, counsellor
- Susie Porter as Sue, mother of Lyndal
- Gyton Grantley as Kevin Guy, offender
- Robert Coleby as John Bowers
- Martin Sacks as Tony, father of Lyndal
- Robert Taylor as Robert Brewster, school council chairman

== Background ==
A school boardermaster of a Toowoomba private school was criminally charged in November 1990 with sexual offences involving children. He committed suicide on the day of a court appearance. In the subsequent 2001 civil court case S v Corporation of the Synod of the Diocese of Brisbane [2001] QSC 473, the offending behaviours were accepted by the defendant, and a suicide note not tended, which included the name of the subject victim of this movie. A jury found for the plaintiff.

The civil case was considered to be an important step leading to the 2013–2017 Australian Royal Commission into Institutional Responses to Child Sexual Abuse. The case also led to the development of the working with children checks government policy across Australia.

== Locations ==
The events centre around the Toowoomba Preparatory School (now known as the Toowoomba Anglican School) with filming around Toowoomba. Some shooting occurred around the Ipswich area, with the historic schoolhouse facade being the National Trust-listed 1888 'Woodlands' at Marburg. Scenes from Picnic Point, Toowoomba were also used.

== Reception ==
Don't Tell was met with positive reviews from critics. On Rotten Tomatoes it has an approval rating of 80% based on reviews from 10 critics.

=== Accolades ===
Award	Category	Subject	Result
AACTA Awards (7th)	Best Adapted Screenplay	Anne Brooksbank	Nominated
AACTA Awards (7th)	Best Adapted Screenplay	Ursula Cleary	Nominated
AACTA Awards (7th)	Best Adapted Screenplay	James Greville	Nominated
AACTA Awards (7th)	Best Actress	Sara West	Nominated
AACTA Awards (7th)	Best Supporting Actor	Jack Thompson	Nominated
AACTA Awards (7th)	Best Supporting Actress	Jacqueline McKenzie	Nominated
ADG Award	Best Direction in a Feature Film	Tori Garrett	Nominated
AFCA Awards	Best Film	Scott Corfield	Nominated
AFCA Awards	Best Screenplay	Anne Brooksbank	Nominated
AFCA Awards	Best Screenplay	Ursula Cleary	Nominated
AFCA Awards	Best Screenplay	James Greville	Nominated
AFCA Awards	Best Actress	Sara West	Nominated
AFCA Awards	Best Supporting Actor	Jack Thompson	Won
AFCA Awards	Best Supporting Actress	Jacqueline McKenzie	Nominated
ASE Award	Best Editing in a Feature Film	Peter Carrodus	Nominated
FCCA Awards	Best Screenplay	Anne Brooksbank	Nominated
FCCA Awards	Best Screenplay	Ursula Cleary	Nominated
FCCA Awards	Best Screenplay	James Greville	Nominated
FCCA Awards	Best Actress	Sara West	Nominated
FCCA Awards	Best Supporting Actor	Jack Thompson	Nominated
FCCA Awards	Best Supporting Actor	Aden Young	Nominated
FCCA Awards	Best Supporting Actress	Jacqueline McKenzie	Nominated
Newport Beach Film Festival	Audience Award for Best Feature Film		Won

== See also ==
- Spotlight
- Oranges and Sunshine
- Cinema of Australia
