= Don't Tell: The Sexual Abuse of Boys =

1997 book by Michel Dorais

- 2008 edition
- Author: Michel Dorais
- Original title: Ça arrive aussi aux garçons: l'abus sexuel au masculin
- Translator: Isabel Denholm Meyer
- Language: French
- Genre: Non-fiction
- Publisher: VLB; Typo éditeur; McGill-Queen's University Press
- Publication date: 1997
- Publication place: Canada

Don't Tell: The Sexual Abuse of Boys, originally released in French as Ça arrive aussi aux garçons: l'abus sexuel au masculin, is a nonfiction book by Michel Dorais (FR). It was published in 1997 in French by VLB (FR). It was later republished by Typo éditeur. The English translation was published by McGill-Queen's University Press in 2002, and Isabel Denholm Meyer was the translator.

The book has testimonials from thirty sexual abuse victims from Canada.

Manon Toupin of La Nouvelle Union stated the English version of the book was very successful in Canada and the United States.

The translator of the English version had a son who was a sexual abuse victim while he was a child; the man died by suicide at age 29.
