= Baghdad Wedding =

Play by Hassan Abdulrazzak

Baghdad Wedding is the first play by Hassan Abdulrazzak. It premiered at the Soho Theatre in London, England in 2007, and was directed by Lisa Goldman.

The play touches on the experience of three Expat Iraqis who return to their country after the overthrow of Saddam Hussein.

A recording of this play was broadcast on BBC Radio 3 on January 20, 2008.

The Company B production ran from February 12, 2009, to March 22, 2009, at the Belvoir St Theatre, Sydney.
