= 2005 Australian Film Institute Awards =

Australian film and TV awards ceremony

47th Australian Film Institute Awards
- Date: 25 November 2005 and 26 November 2005
- Site: Waterfront City Pavilion and Melbourne Central City Studios
- Hosted by: Russell Crowe
- Produced by: Paul Dainty

Highlights
- Best Film: Look Both Ways
- Best Direction: Sarah Watt; Look Both Ways
- Best Actor: Hugo Weaving; Little Fish
- Best Actress: Cate Blanchett; Little Fish
- Supporting Actor: Anthony Hayes; Look Both Ways
- Supporting Actress: Noni Hazlehurst; Little Fish
- Most awards: Feature film: Look Both Ways (5); Television: Love My Way (5)
- Most nominations: Feature film: Little Fish (13); Television: Love My Way (6)

Television coverage
- Network: Nine Network
- Viewership: 900,000

The 47th Annual Australian Film Institute Awards (generally known as AFI Awards), were a series of awards which included the AFI Craft Awards and the AFI Awards Ceremony. Presented by the Australian Film Institute (AFI), the awards celebrated the best in Australian feature film, television, documentary and short film productions of 2005. The two events were held in Melbourne, Victoria, with the former presentation at the Waterfront City Pavilion, and the latter at the Melbourne Central City Studios, on 25 November and 26 November 2005, respectively. The AFI Awards Ceremony was televised on the Nine Network, with actor Russell Crowe hosting both this and the AFI Craft Awards.

Look Both Ways received the most feature film awards with five, including Best Film and Best Direction. Little Fish and The Proposition collected four awards each. The only other winner was Three Dollars with the award for Best Adapted Screenplay. In the television categories, Love My Way won five awards, including Best Drama Series, Best Direction and Best Screenplay. MDA was given two awards. Other television winners were Holly's Heroes, John Safran vs God, The Glass House and The Incredible Journey of Mary Bryant, with one award apiece.

== Ceremony ==
After poor viewership of the 2004 Awards ceremony, the AFI hired live entertainment promoter Paul Dainty to revamp the event. This included splitting the awards into two separate events: The AFI Craft Awards and the AFI Awards Ceremony, which were held on the 25 November and 26 November, respectively. The Craft Awards were presented for technical achievements in feature films, television and non-feature films. The chief executive of the AFI said the reason behind the split was to give "craft nominees more respect, with their own black-tie event." The decision, however, was met with some criticism from industry members, who felt that they were being undermined and overshadowed by the other non-technical categories. Australian Screen Editors said the "split undermines the uniquely collaborative nature of filmmaking and sent the wrong message for the next generation of filmmakers." Guests were entertained at the Craft Awards with performances by Nick Cave and Russell Crowe. Special guest presenters included Geoffrey Rush, Simon Baker, Catherine Martin, Martin Henderson, Christiane Kubrick, Steve Bisley and Paul Grabowsky.

Australian actor Russell Crowe was chosen to host the AFI Craft Awards and the AFI Awards Ceremony. Awards at both presentations were handed out on the 25 November and 26 November, respectively. The latter event received a delayed broadcast on Nine Network at 10:55 pm, and a five-minute segment dedicated to the Craft Awards was shown. The ceremony drew in an audience of 900,000 viewers. Crowe's work as host, and the AFI's decision to hire Dainty to produce the event was well received by critics. The Age felt Dainty's involvement in the production of the ceremony "was pivotal to the awards' renaissance", adding that splitting the awards "put an end to the drawn-out ceremonies of years past." Michaela Boland from Variety praised Crowe for his "charming [and] funny" performance hosting the show. Presenters at the Awards Dinner included Geoffrey Rush, Rachel Griffiths, Baz Luhrmann, Melissa George, Richard Roxburgh, Simon Baker, Jack Thompson, Claudia Karvan, Saskia Burmeister, Sigrid Thornton, Martin Henderson, Vince Colosimo, Susie Porter, Pia Miranda, Alex Dimitriades and Mick Molloy.

== Winners and nominees ==
The nominations were announced by Australian actors Claudia Karvan and Alex Dimitriades on 21 October 2005 at the Wharf Restaurant in Sydney, New South Wales. Leading the feature film nominees was Little Fish with thirteen. Love My Way gained the most television nominations with six.

=== Feature Film ===
Best Film	Best Direction
Look Both Ways – Bridget Ikin; Little Fish – Vincent Sheehan, Liz Watts and Richard Keddie; Oyster Farmer – Anthony Buckley and Piers Tempest; The Proposition – Chris Brown, Jackie O'Sullivan, Chiara Menage and Cat Villiers	Sarah Watt – Look Both Ways; Rowan Woods – Little Fish; John Hillcoat – The Proposition; Greg McLean – Wolf Creek
Best Original Screenplay	Best Adapted Screenplay
Look Both Ways – Sarah Watt; Little Fish – Jacquelin Perske; The Proposition – Nick Cave; Wolf Creek – Greg McLean	Three Dollars – Robert Connolly and Elliot Perlman; Hating Alison Ashley – Christine Madafferi; The Illustrated Family Doctor – Kriv Stenders and David Snell; The Widower – Lyndon Terracini
Best Lead Actor	Best Lead Actress
Hugo Weaving – Little Fish as Lionel Dawson; William McInnes – Look Both Ways as Nick; Guy Pearce – The Proposition as Charlie Burns; Ray Winstone – The Proposition as Captain Morris Stanley	Cate Blanchett – Little Fish as Tracy Louise Heart; Saskia Burmeister – Hating Alison Ashley as Erica Yurken; Justine Clarke – Look Both Ways as Meryl Lee; Frances O'Connor – Three Dollars as Tanya Harnovey
Best Supporting Actor	Best Supporting Actress
Anthony Hayes – Look Both Ways as Andy Walker; Martin Henderson – Little Fish as Ray Robert Heart; John Hurt – The Proposition as Jellon Lamb; Robert Menzies – Three Dollars as Nick	Noni Hazlehurst – Little Fish as Janelle Margaret Heart; Tracy Mann – Hating Alison Ashley as Mum; Daniela Farinacci – Look Both Ways as Julia; Kestie Morassi – Wolf Creek as Kristy Earl
Best Cinematography	Best Editing
The Proposition – Benoît Delhomme; Little Fish – Danny Ruhlmann; Oyster Farmer – Alun Bollinger; Wolf Creek – Will Gibson	Little Fish – Alexandre de Franceschi and John Scott; Look Both Ways – Denise Haratzis; The Proposition – Jon Gregory; Wolf Creek – Jason Ballantine
Best Original Music Score	Best Sound
The Proposition – Nick Cave and Warren Ellis; Little Fish – Nathan Larson; Three Dollars – Alan John; Wolf Creek – François Tétaz	Little Fish – Sam Petty and Peter Grace; Look Both Ways – Andrew Plain, Peter Smith and Toivo Lember; The Proposition – Tim Alban, Paul Davies and Craig Walmsley; Wolf Creek – Des Kenneally, Peter Smith, Pete Best and Tom Heuzenroeder
Best Production Design	Best Costume Design
The Proposition – Chris Kennedy; Little Fish – Luigi Pittorino; Look Both Ways – Rita Zanchetta; Three Dollars – Luigi Pittorino	The Proposition – Margot Wilson; Hating Alison Ashley – Paul Warren; Little Fish – Melinda Doring; Look Both Ways – Edie Kurzer

=== Television ===
Best Drama Series	Best Comedy Series
Love My Way (Foxtel) – John Edwards and Claudia Karvan; All Saints, Series 8 (Seven Network) – MaryAnne Carroll; Blue Heelers, Series 12 (Seven Network) – Gus Howard and David Clarke; MDA, Series 3 (ABC) – Denny Lawrence	John Safran vs God (SBS) – Selin Yaman and John Safran; Comedy Inc. The Late Shift, Series 3 (Nine Network) – David McDonald; The Chaser Decides (ABC) – Chaser Crackerjack; We Can Be Heroes: Finding the Australian of the Year (ABC) – Laura Waters and Chris Lilley
Best Telefeature or Mini Series	Best Light Entertainment Series
The Incredible Journey of Mary Bryant (Network Ten) – Andrew Benson and Greg Haddrick; Hell Has Harbour Views (ABC) – Ian Collie; Little Oberon (Nine Network) – Susan Bower; Through My Eyes (Seven Network) – Simone North and Tony Cavanaugh	The Glass House, Series 5 (ABC) – Ted Robinson; Enough Rope with Andrew Denton, Series 3 (ABC) – Anita Jacoby and Andrew Denton; RocKwiz (SBS) – Brian Nankervis, Ken Connor, Peter Bain-Hogg; Spicks and Specks (ABC) – Paul Clarke, Bruce Kane, Anthony Watt
Best Lead Actor	Best Lead Actress
Shane Bourne – MDA, Series 3 (ABC); Chris Lilley – We Can Be Heroes: Finding the Australian of the Year (ABC); Alex O'Loughlin – The Incredible Journey of Mary Bryant (Network Ten); Dan Wyllie – Love My Way (Foxtel)	Claudia Karvan – Love My Way (Foxtel); Romola Garai – The Incredible Journey of Mary Bryant (Network Ten); Miranda Otto – Through My Eyes (Seven Network); Sigrid Thornton – Little Oberon (Nine Network)
Best Guest or Supporting Actor	Best Guest or Supporting Actress
Max Cullen – Love My Way: Episode 8, "A Different Planet" (Foxtel); Tony Barry – Hell Has Harbour Views (ABC); Steve Bisley – Hell Has Harbour Views (ABC); Frank Gallacher – MDA, Series 3 - Episode 12, "A Human Cost (Part 4)" (ABC)	Anita Hegh – MDA, Series 3 - Episode 6, "Departure Lounge (Part 2)" (ABC); Alyssa McClelland – Small Claims: White Wedding (Network Ten); Alice McConnell – The Incredible Journey of Mary Bryant (Network Ten); Angie Milliken – Through My Eyes (Seven Network)
Best Direction	Best Screenplay
Jessica Hobbs – Love My Way, Episode 8, "A Different Planet" (Foxtel); Peter Andrikidis – The Incredible Journey of Mary Bryant (Network Ten); David McDonald – Comedy Inc. The Late Shift, Series 3 - Episode 1 (Nine Network); Matthew Saville – We Can Be Heroes - Episode 5 (ABC)	Jacquelin Perske – Love My Way - Episode 9, "Only Mortal" (Foxtel); Peter Berry – The Incredible Journey of Mary Bryant (Network Ten); Greg Haddrick – MDA, Series 3 - Episode 12, "A Human Cost (Part 4)" (ABC); Chris Lilley – We Can Be Heroes - Episode 1 (ABC)
Best Children's Television Drama	Outstanding Achievement in Television Screen Craft
Holly's Heroes (Nine Network) – Ann Darrouzet, Dave Gibson and Jenni Tosi; Blue Water High (ABC) – Noel Price and Dennis Kiely; Scooter: Secret Agent (Network Ten) – Daniel Scharf and Jonathan Shiff	John Safran (for original concept) – John Safran vs God (SBS); Brian Alexander (for production design) – Scooter: Secret Agent (Network Ten); Tim Ferrier (for production design) – The Incredible Journey of Mary Bryant (Network Ten); Louis Irving ACS (for cinematography) – Love My Way (Foxtel)

=== Non-feature film ===
Best Documentary	Best Direction in a Documentary
Land Mines - A Love Story – Dennis O'Rourke; Girl in a Mirror – Helen Bowden; Jabe Babe: A Heightened Life – Janet Merewether, Deborah Szapiro and Georgia Wallace-Crabbe; Killers in Eden – Klaus Toft	Janet Merewether – Jabe Babe: A Heightened Life; Kathy Drayton – Girl in a Mirror; John Moore – Abortion, Corruption and Cops: The Bertram Wainer Story; Klaus Toft – Killers in Eden
Best Short Fiction Film	Best Short Animation
Jewboy – Tony Krawitz (Director); A Message from Fallujah – Richard Gibson (Director); Azadi – Anthony Maras (Director); The Eye Inside – Cordelia Beresford (Director)	The Mysterious Geographic Explorations of Jasper Morello – Anthony Lucas (Director); 2:41 Upfield – Callum Cooper (Director); Fritz Gets Rich – Eddie White and James Calvert (Directors); Piñata – Mike Hollands (Director)
Best Screenplay in a Short Film	Best Cinematography in a Non-Feature Film
Tony Krawitz – Jewboy; Wayne Blair – The Djarn Djarns; Jody Dwyer – Barely Visible; Mark Shirrefs – The Mysterious Geographic Explorations of Jasper Morello	Greig Fraser – Jewboy; Cordelia Beresford – The Eye Inside; Jenni Meaney – Abortion, Corruption and Cops: The Bertram Wainer Story; Corey Piper – Opal Fever
Best Editing in a Non-Feature Film	Best Sound in a Non-Feature Film
James Bradley – Mr. Patterns; Henry Dangar ASE – The Djarn Djarns; Paul Hamilton and Michael Horton – All Points of the Compass; Jane Moran – Jewboy	Leo Sullivan, Tony Vaccher and Danny Longhurst – Vietnam Symphony; Doron Kipen, Emma Bortignon and Ken Sallows ASE – Iraq, My Country; Basil Krivoroutchko and Davin Patterson – Cool; Sam Petty and Mark Blackwell – Jewboy
Outstanding Achievement in Craft in a Non-Feature Film
Anthony Lucas (for production design) – The Mysterious Geographic Explorations of Jasper Morello; Karla Urizar (for production design) – Jabe Babe: A Heightened Life; Phillip Crawford (for production initiative and realisation) – Knot at Home Project; Ewen Leslie (for performance) – Jewboy

=== Additional Awards ===
International Award for Excellence in Filmmaking	News Limited Readers' Choice Award
Roger Savage (for Sound) – House of Flying Daggers	Cate Blanchett
Young Actor's Award	
Sophie Luck – Blue Water High; Maddi Newling – Danya; Brittany Brynes – Little Oberon; Joanna Hunt-Prokhovnik – Three Dollars	
International Award for Best Actor	International Award for Best Actress
Russell Crowe – Cinderella Man	Emily Browning – Lemony Snicket's A Series of Unfortunate Events

=== Individual Awards ===
Award	Winner
Byron Kennedy Award	Chris Kennedy
Raymond Longford Award	Ray Barrett

== Multiple nominations ==
The following films received multiple nominations.

- 13 nominations: Little Fish
- 12 nominations: The Proposition
- 11 nominations: Look Both Ways
- 6 nominations: Wolf Creek

== See also ==
- AACTA Awards
