= AACTA Award for Outstanding Achievement in Television Screen Craft =

Former Australian television award

Outstanding Achievement in Television Screen Craft AACTA Award
- Country: Australia
- Presented by: Australian Academy of Cinema and Television Arts (AACTA)
- First award: 2000
- Currently held by: Shaun Micallef, Talkin' 'Bout Your Generation (2010)
- Website: http://www.aacta.org

The AACTA Award for Outstanding Achievement in Television Screen Craft is a special discretionary award, presented by the Australian Academy of Cinema and Television Arts (AACTA) for achievements in television screen crafts, in fields excluding acting, direction, producing and screenwriting. The award was presented by the Australian Film Institute (AFI), from 2006 to 2010, at the Australian Film Institute Awards (known commonly as the AFI Awards).

In the following tables, from 2000 to 2006 winners are listed first, in boldface and highlighted in gold; those listed below the winner that are not in boldface or highlighted are the nominees; from 2007, onwards, the award was presented as a special award.

Winner of competitive award

== Winners and nominees (2000-2006) ==
Year	Nominees(s)	Program	Craft
**2000** (42nd)	**Roger Ford and Sally Shepherd**	**On the Beach**	Set design
2000 (42nd)	Mark Wareham	BeastMaster	Cinematography
2000 (42nd)	Brent Crockett	Halifax f.p.	Cinematography
2000 (42nd)	Martin McGrath	On the Beach	Cinematography
**2001** (43rd)	**Shawn Seet**	**Do or Die**	Editing
2001 (43rd)	Henry Dangar and Nicole La Macchia	Love Is a Four Letter Word	Editing
2001 (43rd)	Jo Ford	My Brother Jack	Production design
2001 (43rd)	Peter Best	My Husband, My Killer	Original score
**2002** (44th)	**Jo Ford**	**The Road from Coorain**	Production design
2002 (44th)	Brent Crockett	Halifax f.p.	Cinematography
2002 (44th)	Tristan Milani	The Road from Coorain	Cinematography
2002 (44th)	Steven Rae	The Road from Coorain	Original score
**2003** (45th)	**John Safran**	**John Safran's Music Jamboree**	Original and innovative programme concept
2003 (45th)	Cezary Skubiszewski	After the Deluge	Original music
2003 (45th)	Peta Hastings, Karchi Maygar, Natalie Vincentich	Big Bite	Creative make-up
2003 (45th)	Craig Barden	Bootleg	Cinematography
**2004** (46th)	**Kitty Stuckey**	**Kath & Kim**	Costume design
2004 (46th)	Paul Grabowsky	Jessica	Music composition
2004 (46th)	Paul Nichola	Noah and Saskia	Animation and digital effects
2004 (46th)	Barry Lanfranchi	Wicked Science	Digital editing
**2005** (47th)	**John Safran**	**John Safran vs God**	Original concept
2005 (47th)	Louis Irving	Love My Way	Cinematography
2005 (47th)	Brian Alexander	Scooter: Secret Agent	Production design
2005 (47th)	Tim Ferrier	The Incredible Journey of Mary Bryant	Production design
**2006** (48th)	**Joseph Pickering**	**The Forest**	Cinematography
2006 (48th)	Rob Meyer	Comedy Inc: The Late Shift	Cinematography
2006 (48th)	Ian Jones	RAN Remote Area Nurse	Cinematography
2006 (48th)	Tim Millikan, Michael Letho and Stephen Witherow	RocKwiz	Sound

== Winners (2007-present) ==
Year	Recipient(s)	Program	Craft
**2007** (49th)	**Paddy Reardon**	**Bastard Boys, Call Me Mum and The King**	Production design
**2008** (50th)	**Steve Evans**	**Underbelly**	Editing
**2009** (51st)	**Luke Jurevicius**	**Figaro Pho**	Creative excellence
**2010** (52nd)	**Shaun Micallef**	**Talkin' 'Bout Your Generation**	Host
**2011** (1st)	**Herbert Pinter**	**Cloudstreet**	Production Design

== See also ==
- AACTA Awards
