= AACTA Award for Best Screenplay in Television =

Australian television award

Best Screenplay in Television AACTA Award
- Country: Australia
- Presented by: Australian Academy of Cinema and Television Arts (AACTA)
- First award: 1986
- Website: https://www.aacta.org

The AACTA Award for Best Screenplay in Television, formerly AFI Award for Best Screenplay in Television, is an award presented by the Australian Academy of Cinema and Television Arts (AACTA).

== History ==
From 1986 to 2010, the category was presented by the Australian Film Institute (AFI), the Academy's parent organisation, at the annual Australian Film Institute Awards (known as the AFI Awards).

When the award was first introduced, it was handed out as two awards: Mini-Series Screenplay and Telefeature Screenplay. The name was changed to Best Screenplay in a Mini-Series or Television Drama in 1990, and the following year it became Best Screenplay in a Television Drama until 2003 where the award was renamed to its current title.

When the AFI launched the Academy in 2011, it changed the annual ceremony to the AACTA Awards, with the current award being a continuum of the AFI Award for Best Screenplay in Television. AACTA is a non-profit organisation whose aim is to "identify, award, promote and celebrate Australia's greatest achievements in film and television".

== Ceremony ==
The award is presented at the annual AACTA Awards, which hand out accolades for achievements in feature film, television, documentaries and short films.

== Winners and nominees ==
In the following tables, the years listed correspond to the year of film release; the ceremonies are usually held the same year.^{[A]} The writer and programme in bold and in yellow background have won the award. Those that are neither highlighted nor in bold are the nominees. When sorted chronologically, the tables always lists the winning writer and programme first and then the other nominees.

=== Best Mini-Series Screenplay ===
Year	Program	Writer(s)	Network
**1986** (28th)	**The Dunera Boys**	**Ben Lewin**	**Network Ten**
**1987** (29th)
**1987** (29th)	**In Between**	**Maureen McCarthy** and **Shane Brennan**	**SBS**
**1987** (29th)	The Challenge	David Phillips	Nine Network
**1987** (29th)	The Great Bookie Robbery	Philip Cornford and Ian Bradley	Nine Network
**1987** (29th)	Vietnam	Terry Hayes, John Duigan and Chris Noonan	Network Ten
**1988** (30th)	**Not awarded**		
**1989** (31st)
**1989** (31st)	**Bodysurfer**	**Suzanne Hawley**, **Christopher Lee** and **Denis Whitburn**	**ABC**
**1989** (31st)	**Edens Lost**	**Michael Gow**	**ABC**
**1989** (31st)	Act of Betrayal	Michael Chaplin and Nick Evans	ABC
**1989** (31st)	Barlow and Chambers: A Long Way From Home	Bill Kerby	Nine Network

=== Best Telefeature Screenplay ===
Year	Program	Writer(s)	Network
**1986** (28th)	**Natural Causes**	**John Misto**	**ABC**
**1987** (29th)
**1987** (29th)	**Two Friends**	**Helen Garner**	**ABC**
**1987** (29th)	The Hour Before My Brother Dies	Daniel Keene	ABC
**1987** (29th)	Hunger	Louis Nowra	ABC
**1987** (29th)	Just Us	Ted Roberts	Seven Network
**1988** (30th)	**Not awarded**		
**1989** (31st)
**1989** (31st)	**Police State**	**Ian David** and **Francine Finnane**	**ABC**
**1989** (31st)	Malpractice	Jenny Ainge	Nine Network
**1989** (31st)	Rescue	Everett De Roche	ABC
**1989** (31st)	Prejudice	Pamela Williams	Nine Network

=== Best Screenplay in a Mini-Series or Television Drama ===
Year	Program	Writer(s)	Network
**1990** (32nd)
**1990** (32nd)	**The Magistrate**	**Chris Warner**	**ABC**
**1990** (32nd)	Come In Spinner	Nick Enright and Lissa Benyon	ABC
**1990** (32nd)	The Girl from Tomorrow	Mark Shirrefs and John Thomson	Nine Network
**1990** (32nd)	Police Crop	Ian David	ABC

=== Best Screenplay in a Television Drama ===
Year	Program	Episode	Writer(s)	Network
**1991** (33rd)
**1991** (33rd)	**Police Rescue**	**"Angel After Hours"**	**Peter Schreck**	**ABC**
**1991** (33rd)	Embassy	"A Human Dimension"	Anne Lucas	ABC
**1991** (33rd)	More Winners	"The Big Wish"	Steve J. Spears	ABC
**1991** (33rd)	The Paper Man		Keith Aberdein and John Lonie	ABC
**1992** (34th)
**1992** (34th)	**Brides of Christ**		**John Alsop and Sue Smith**	**ABC**
**1992** (34th)	Phoenix	"Fond Memories"	Cliff Green	ABC
**1992** (34th)	Phoenix	"Hard Ball"	Alison Nisselle	ABC
**1992** (34th)	Six Pack	"Piccolo Mondo"	Andrew Bovell	SBS
**1993** (35th)
**1993** (35th)	**The Leaving of Liverpool**		**John Alsop and Sue Smith**	**ABC**
**1993** (35th)	Seven Deadly Sins	"Sloth"	Hannie Rayson	ABC
**1993** (35th)	Round the Twist	"Little Squirt"	Paul Jennings and Esben Storm	ABC
**1993** (35th)	Police Rescue	"Lifeline"	Debra Oswald	ABC
**1994** (36th)
**1994** (36th)	**The Damnation of Harvey McHugh**	**"Hey, St Jude"**	**John Misto**	**ABC**
**1994** (36th)	Under the Skin	"The Long Ride"	Tony Ayres	SBS
**1994** (36th)	G.P.	"Double Bind"	Kristen Dunphy	ABC
**1994** (36th)	Blue Heelers	"Nowhere to Run"	Susan Hore	Seven Network
**1995** (37th)
**1995** (37th)	**Frontline**	**"The Siege"**	**Rob Sitch**, **Santo Cilauro**, **Jane Kennedy** and **Tom Gleisner**	**ABC**
**1995** (37th)	Halifax f.p.	"Lies of the Mind"	Jan Sardi	Nine Network
**1995** (37th)	Halifax f.p.	"The Feeding"	Mac Gudgeon	Nine Network
**1995** (37th)	Janus	"Not on the Merits"	Cliff Green	ABC
**1996** (38th)
**1996** (38th)	**Blue Murder**		**Ian David**	**ABC**
**1996** (38th)	Frontline	"Keeping Up Appearances"	Rob Sitch, Santo Cilauro, Jane Kennedy and Tom Gleisner	ABC
**1996** (38th)	G.P.	"Ceremony of Innocence"	Katherine Thomson	ABC
**1997** (39th)
**1997** (39th)	**Frontline**	**"The Simple Life"**	**Rob Sitch**, **Santo Cilauro**, **Jane Kennedy** and **Tom Gleisner**	**ABC**
**1997** (39th)	Frontline	"Epitaph"	Rob Sitch, Santo Cilauro, Jane Kennedy and Tom Gleisner	ABC
**1997** (39th)	Good Guys, Bad Guys	"1.8 Million Reasons to Change Your Name Part 2"	Graeme Koetsveld	Nine Network
**1997** (39th)	Simone de Beauvoir's Babies	"Episode 3"	Deborah Cox	ABC
**1998** (40th)
**1998** (40th)	**Wildside**	**"Episode 17"**	**Tim Pye**	**ABC**
**1998** (40th)	Halifax f.p.	"Afraid of the Dark"	Roger Simpson	Nine Network
**1998** (40th)	SeaChange	"Stormy Weather"	Deborah Cox	ABC
**1998** (40th)	The Violent Earth		Peter Gawler and Tony Ayres	Nine Network
**1999** (41st)
**1999** (41st)	**The Day of the Roses**		**John Misto**	**Network Ten**
**1999** (41st)	SeaChange	"Law and Order"	Deborah Cox	ABC
**1999** (41st)	SeaChange	"Manna From Heaven"	Deborah Cox and Andrew Knight	ABC
**1999** (41st)	Wildside	"Episode 19"	Kris Wyld	ABC
**2000** (42nd)
**2000** (42nd)	**Grass Roots**	**"The Whole Year"**	**Geoffrey Atherden**	**ABC**
**2000** (42nd)	Grass Roots	"Late July, Friday 4pm to 10.30pm"	Geoffrey Atherden	ABC
**2000** (42nd)	Halifax f.p.	"A Person of Interest"	Anne Brooksbank	Nine Network
**2000** (42nd)	Something in the Air	"We Will Remember Them"	Katherine Thomson	ABC
**2001** (43rd)
**2001** (43rd)	**The Games**	**"Solar"**	**John Clarke** and **Ross Stevenson**	**ABC**
**2001** (43rd)	Changi		John Doyle	ABC
**2001** (43rd)	SeaChange	"I Name Thee Bay of Pearls"	Deborah Cox and Andrew Knight	ABC
**2001** (43rd)	SeaChange	"Love in the Time of Coleridge"	Hannie Rayson and Andrea Denholm	ABC
**2002** (44th)
**2002** (44th)	**Kath & Kim**	**"Wedding"**	**Gina Riley** and **Jane Turner**	**ABC**
**2002** (44th)	Halifax f.p.	"Takes Two"	Katherine Thomson	Nine Network
**2002** (44th)	Kath & Kim	"Gay"	Gina Riley and Jane Turner	ABC
**2002** (44th)	The Secret Life of Us	"Intimations of Mortality"	Christopher Lee	Network Ten

=== Best Screenplay in Television ===
Year	Program	Episode	Writer(s)	Network
**2003** (45th)
**2003** (45th)	**Grass Roots**	**"By-Election"**	**Geoffrey Atherden**	**ABC**
**2003** (45th)	After the Deluge		Andrew Knight	Network Ten
**2003** (45th)	CNNNN	"Lunchgate"	Chris Taylor, Julian Morrow and Charles Firth	ABC
**2003** (45th)	MDA	"Crossing the Line"	Bill Garner	ABC
**2004** (46th)
**2004** (46th)	**Marking Time**		**John Doyle**	**ABC**
**2004** (46th)	Kath & Kim	"The Hideous Truth"	Gina Riley and Jane Turner	ABC
**2004** (46th)	Stingers	"Break and Enter"	Matt Ford	Nine Network
**2004** (46th)	The Brush-Off		John Clarke	Seven Network
**2005** (47th)
**2005** (47th)	**Love My Way**	**"Only Mortal"**	**Jacquelin Perske**	**Fox8**
**2005** (47th)	MDA	"A Human Cost (Part 4)"	Greg Haddrick	ABC
**2005** (47th)	The Incredible Journey of Mary Bryant		Peter Berry	Network Ten
**2005** (47th)	We Can Be Heroes: Finding The Australian of the Year	"Episode 1"	Chris Lilley	ABC
**2006** (48th)
**2006** (48th)	**RAN**	**"Blue Hawaii"**	**Sue Smith**	**SBS**
**2006** (48th)	Love My Way	"Five Minutes of Fame"	Jacquelin Perske	W
**2006** (48th)	Mortified	"Taylor's DNA"	Angela Webber	Nine Network
**2006** (48th)	The Chaser's War on Everything	"Episode 8"	Chris Taylor, Julian Morrow, Craig Reucassel, Andrew Hansen, Chas Licciardello, Dominic Knight and Charles Firth	ABC
**2007** (49th)
**2007** (49th)	**Bastard Boys**		**Sue Smith**	**ABC**
**2007** (49th)	Lockie Leonard	"The Ladder of Love"	Keith Thompson	Nine Network
**2007** (49th)	Love My Way	"Cars Without Brakes"	Tony McNamara	Showtime
**2007** (49th)	The Circuit	"Home Is Where the Past Is"	Kelly Lefever	SBS
**2008** (50th)
**2008** (50th)	**The Hollowmen**	**"Fat Chance"**	**Santo Cilauro**, **Tom Gleisner** and **Rob Sitch**	**ABC1**
**2008** (50th)	Dogstar	"Tail's End"	Philip Dalkin	Nine Network
**2008** (50th)	East West 101	"Death at the Station"	Kris Wyld	SBS
**2008** (50th)	Underbelly	"Sorcerer's Apprentice"	Peter Gawler	Nine Network
**2009** (51st)
**2009** (51st)	**Underbelly: A Tale of Two Cities**	**"The Brotherhood"**	**Kris Mrksa**	**Nine Network**
**2009** (51st)	30 Seconds	"Invisible Fault Lines"	Tim Bullock, Justin Drape and Scott Nowell	The Comedy Channel
**2009** (51st)	East West 101	"Atonement"	Michael Miller and Kristen Dunphy	SBS
**2009** (51st)	Review with Myles Barlow	"Episode 1"	Trent O'Donnell and Phil Lloyd	ABC
**2010** (52nd)
**2010** (52nd)	**Wilfred**	**"Dog Star"**	**Jason Gann and Adam Zwar**	**SBS**
**2010** (52nd)	Hawke		Glen Dolman	Network Ten
**2010** (52nd)	Review with Myles Barlow	"Happiness, Escapism, Acceptance"	Trent O'Donnell and Phil Lloyd	ABC
**2010** (52nd)	Tangle	"Sleepwalking"	Fiona Seres	Showcase

AACTA Awards

Year	Program	Episode	Writer(s)	Network
**2011** (1st)
**2011** (1st)	**The Slap**	**"Harry"**	**Brendan Cowell**	**ABC1**
**2011** (1st)	Cloudstreet	"Part 3"	Tim Winton and Ellen Fontana	Showcase
**2011** (1st)	Laid	"Episode 3"	Kirsty Fisher	ABC1
**2011** (1st)	The Slap	"Hector"	Kris Mrksa	ABC1
**2012** (2nd)
**2012** (2nd)	**Redfern Now**	**"Pretty Boy Blue"**	**Steven McGregor**	**ABC1**
**2012** (2nd)	A Moody Christmas	"Water Under the Bridge"	Trent O'Donnell and Phil Lloyd	ABC1
**2012** (2nd)	Lowdown	"One Fine Gay"	Amanda Brotchie, Adam Zwar and Trudy Hellier	ABC1
**2012** (2nd)	Puberty Blues	"Episode 5"	Alice Bell and Tony McNamara	Network Ten
**2013** (3rd)
**2013** (3rd)	**Offspring**	**"Episode 13"**	**Debra Oswald**	**Network Ten**
**2013** (3rd)	Upper Middle Bogan	"No Angel"	Robyn Butler, Wayne Hope, and Gary McCaffrie	ABC1
**2013** (3rd)	Redfern Now	"Babe in Arms"	Steven McGregor	ABC1
**2013** (3rd)	Power Games: The Packer-Murdoch War	"Part One"	Samantha Winston	Nine Network
