= List of Australian films of 2005 =

== 2005 ==
Title	Director	Cast	Genre	Notes
5 Seasons	Steven McGregor	Moses Numamurdirdi, Tom E. Lewis	Documentary	
The Actress	Zak Hilditch	Caitlin Higgins, Matt Hardie	Comedy	
The Big Red	Greg Parker		Documentary	
The Black Road	William Nessen	William Nessen, Sya’diah Syeh Marhaban	Documentary	
Blacktown	Kriv Stenders	Clayton Jacobson, Niki Owen	Drama	
The Comeback Kings	Joel Peterson	Colin Burgess, Denny Burgess		
Deck Dogz	Steve Pasvolsky	Richard Wilson, Sean Kennedy, Tony Hawk	Drama	
The Edge of the World	Shaun M. Jefford	Lee Martin, Clare Mackey	Drama	
The Extra	Kevin Carlin	Jimeoin, Katherine Slattery, Rhys Muldoon	Comedy	
Feed	Brett Leonard	Alex O'Loughlin, Patrick Thompson	Thriller	
Fink!	Tim Boyle	Sam Worthington, Steve Bastoni	Crime	
The Great Raid	John Dahl	Benjamin Bratt, Joseph Fiennes	War	
Hating Alison Ashley	Geoff Bennett	Saskia Burmeister, Delta Goodrem, Tracy Mann	Comedy	
The Hidden History of Homosexual Australia	Con Anemogiannis	Simon Burke	Documentary	
I Told You I Was Ill: The Life and Legacy of Spike Milligan				
The Illustrated Family Doctor	Kriv Stenders	Samuel Johnson, Colin Friels, Jessica Napier	Drama	
In the Shadow of the Palms - Iraq	Wayne Coles-Janess		Documentary	
Jabe Babe - A Heightened Life	Janet Merewether	Jabe Babe,	Documentary	
Jewboy	Tony Krawitz	Ewen Leslie, Chris Hayward, Saskia Burmeister	Drama	Screened at the 2005 Cannes Film Festival
Little Fish	Rowan Woods	Cate Blanchett, Hugo Weaving, Sam Neill	Drama	
The Living Graveyard	Lin Sutherland	Lin Sutherland	Documentary	
Look Both Ways	Sarah Watt	William McInnes, Justine Clarke, Anthony Hayes	Drama	AACTA Award for Best Film
The Magician	Scott Ryan	Scott Ryan, Ben Walker, Massimiliano Andrighetto	Mockumentary	
Make It Real (to Me)	Miles Roston	Kevin Sumba Okomba, Sennye Mugale	Documentary	
Man-Thing	Brett Leonard	Matthew Le Nevez, Rachael Taylor, Jack Thompson	Horror	
The Marey Project				
Meat Pie				
One Afternoon				
One Day				
Opal Dream	Peter Cattaneo	Vince Colosimo, Jacqueline McKenzie		
Peter Berner's Loaded Brush				
The Proposition	John Hillcoat	Guy Pearce, Stan Winston, Danny Huston	Western	
Puppy	Kieran Galvin	Nadia Townsend, Bernard Curry, Sally Bull		
Ra Choi	M. Frank	Janneke Arent, Larni Attwood, Nammi Le Benson		
RASH	Nicholas Hansen	Chali 2na Ha Ha, TOWER, Sixten	Documentary	
Reason 2 Kill				
Redefining Tom Nash				
Safety in Numbers				
Scratched				
Sounds and Visions of Dreamtime				
Stories of Lost Souls				
A Stranger in My Homeland	Chloe Traicos			
Stranded				
Thirty Eight				
Three Dollars	Robert Connolly	David Wenham, Frances O'Connor, Sarah Wynter	Drama	
Truth, Lies and Intelligence				
Troy's Story				
Vietnam Nurses	Polly Watkins		Documentary	Won 1 2006 AFI award, 3 nominations
Wolf Creek	Greg McLean	John Jarratt, Cassandra Magrath, Kestie Morassi, Nathan Phillips	Horror	
You and Your Stupid Mate	Marc Gracie, Kate Gorman	Angus Sampson, Nathan Phillips, Rachel Hunter	Comedy	

== See also ==
- 2005 in Australia
- 2005 in Australian television
- List of 2005 box office number-one films in Australia
