= AACTA Award for Best Lead Actor in a Television Drama =

Australian television award

- Country: Australia
- Presented by: Australian Academy of Cinema and Television Arts (AACTA)
- First award: 1986
- Currently held by: Lachy Hulme, Power Games: The Packer-Murdoch War (2013)
- Website: aacta.org

The AACTA Award for Best Lead Actor in a Television Drama is an accolade given by the Australian Academy of Cinema and Television Arts (AACTA), a non-profit organisation whose aim is to "identify, award, promote and celebrate Australia's greatest achievements in film and television." The award is handed out at the annual AACTA Awards, which rewards achievements in Australian feature film, television, documentaries and short films. From 1986 to 2010, the category was presented by the Australian Film Institute (AFI), the Academy's parent organisation, at the annual Australian Film Institute Awards (known as the AFI Awards). When the AFI launched the Academy in 2011, it changed the annual ceremony to the AACTA Awards, with the current prize being a continuum of the AFI Award for Best Lead Actor in a Television Drama.

The award was first presented in 1986, as two separate categories for performances in a miniseries and tele feature. These were then merged in 1990 to become Best Actor in a Leading Role in a Telefeature or Mini Series, and by 1991, the award was renamed Best Actor in a Leading Role in a Television Drama. In 2000, the Best Performance in a Telefeature or Mini Series accolade was re-introduced as a separate prize from the drama award. All of these were then combined in 2002, under the title Best Actor in a Leading Role in a Television Drama, and two years later, in 2004, was renamed Best Actor in a Leading Role in a Television Drama or Comedy. A separate comedy award was established in 2006, and the name reverted to Best Lead Actor in a Television Drama.

The AACTA Award for Best Lead Actor in a Television Drama is given for performances in television drama series, miniseries, telefeature, children's animation or children's drama series. Candidates for this award must be human and male, and cannot be nominated for best guest or supporting actor in a television drama in the same year, for the same production.

== Winners and nominees ==
In the following table, the years listed correspond to the year that the television programme aired on Australian television; the ceremonies are usually held the following year.^{[A]} The actor whose name is emphasised in boldface and highlighted in yellow have won the award. Those that are neither highlighted nor in bold are the nominees. When sorted chronologically, the table always lists the winning actor first and then the other nominees. There was no nomination announcement for television categories leading up to the 1986 awards, and therefore only the winners are known.

All sources used in this article make no mention of the episode or series that the actor was nominated for prior to 1991, and therefore have "N/A" template in the "Episode/Series" column. After 1991, the winners and nominees with the "N/A" template in the "Episode/Series" column are television films or miniseries. Those winners and nominees which have the "N/A" template and crosses (†) in the "Episode/Series" column, are TV series, but all reliable sources do not indicate which episode or series the actor was nominated for.

=== Best Performance by an Actor in a Leading Role in a Mini Series (1986–1989) ===
Year	Actor	Program	Character(s)	Episode/Series	Network
**1986** (28th)	**Simon Chilvers**	**The Dunera Boys**	**Col. Berry**	—N/a	**ABC**
**1987** (29th)
**1987** (29th)	**Nicholas Eadie**	**Vietnam**	**Phil Goddard**	—N/a	**Network Ten**
**1987** (29th)	Martyn Sanderson	The Harp in the South	Hughie Darcy	—N/a	Network Ten
**1987** (29th)	Vichea Ten	In Between	Saret	—N/a	SBS
**1987** (29th)	John Wood	The Challenge	Alan Bond	—N/a	Nine Network
**1988** (30th)
**1988** (30th)	**Ed Devereaux**	**True Believers**	**Ben Chifley**	—N/a	**ABC**
**1988** (30th)	Simon Chilvers	True Believers	H. V. Evatt	—N/a	ABC
**1988** (30th)	Shane Connor	Poor Man's Orange	Charlie Rothe	—N/a	Network Ten
**1988** (30th)	Keith Michell	Captain James Cook	Captain James Cook	—N/a	ABC
**1989** (31st)
**1989** (31st)	**Peter Kowitz**	**Bodysurfer**	**David Lang**	—N/a	**ABC**
**1989** (31st)	Patrick Bergin	Act of Betrayal	Michael McGurk	—N/a	ABC
**1989** (31st)	John Jarratt	Fields of Fire III	Jacko	—N/a	Nine Network
**1989** (31st)	John Polson	Barlow & Chambers: A Long Way From Home	Kevin Barlow	—N/a	Nine Network

=== Best Performance by an Actor in a Leading Role in a Telefeature (1986–1989) ===
Year	Actor	Program	Character(s)	Episode/Series	Network
**1986** (28th)	**Peter Kowitz**	**The Long Way Home**	**Graham**	—N/a	**ABC**
**1987** (29th)
**1987** (29th)	**Steve Jacobs**	**A Single Life**	**Richard Bennett**	—N/a	**ABC**
**1987** (29th)	Shane Connor	Army Wives	Grant	—N/a	Network Ten
**1987** (29th)	Ernie Dingo	Tudawali	Robert Tudawali	—N/a	SBS
**1987** (29th)	Brendan Higgins	Hunger	Michael Radulesco	—N/a	ABC
**1988** (30th)
**1988** (30th)	**Ernie Dingo**	**A Waltz Through the Hills**	**Frank Smith**	—N/a	**Nine Network**
**1988** (30th)	Nicholas Eadie	Fragments of War: The Story of Damien Parer	Damien Parer	—N/a	Network Ten
**1988** (30th)	John Hargreaves	The Lizard King	^{[B]}	—N/a	ABC
**1988** (30th)	Nick Tate	Olive	Anthony Wheeler	—N/a	ABC
**1989** (31st)
**1989** (31st)	**Bill Hunter**	**Police State**	**Graeme Parker**	—N/a	**ABC**
**1989** (31st)	Bob Baines	Malpractice	Doug Davis	—N/a	ABC
**1989** (31st)	Gary Sweet	Police Rescue	Sgt. Steve 'Mickey' McClintock	—N/a	ABC
**1989** (31st)	Max Phipps	Police State	Terry Lewis	—N/a	ABC

=== Best Performance by an Actor in a Leading Role, in a Mini-Series or Telefeature (1990) ===
Year	Actor	Program	Character(s)	Episode/Series	Network
**1990** (32nd)
**1990** (32nd)	**Frankie J. Holden**	**Police Crop: The Winchester Conspiracy**	**Det. Con. Max Chapman**	—N/a	**ABC**
**1990** (32nd)	Terry Gill	Police Crop: The Winchester Conspiracy	Det. Sgt. Bill Cullen	—N/a	ABC
**1990** (32nd)	Rhys McConnochie	Come In Spinner	Angus McFarland	—N/a	ABC
**1990** (32nd)	Franco Nero	The Magistrate	Paolo Pizzi	—N/a	ABC

=== Best Actor in a Leading Role in a Television Drama (1991–2002) ===
Year	Actor	Program	Character(s)	Episode/Series	Network
**1991** (33rd)
**1991** (33rd)	**Gary Sweet**	**Police Rescue**	**Sgt. Steve "Mickey" McClintock**	**Series 1, Episode 1: "Mates"**	**ABC**
**1991** (33rd)	Steve Bastoni	Police Rescue	Yiannis Angelopoulos	Series 1, Episode 2: "Angel After Hours"	ABC
**1991** (33rd)	Nico Lathouris	Police Rescue	Nicos Angelopoulos	Series 1, Episode 2: "Angel After Hours"	ABC
**1991** (33rd)	Cameron Nugent	More Winners	CW	—N/a	ABC
**1992** (34th)
**1992** (34th)	**Gary Sweet**	**Police Rescue**	**Sgt. Steve "Mickey" McClintock**	**Series 2, Episode 2: "Off the Track"**	**ABC**
**1992** (34th)	Alan Fletcher	Embassy	Michael Clayton	Series 3, Episode 12: "Hostage"	ABC
**1992** (34th)	Marshall Napier	Police Rescue	Sgt. Fred "Frog" Catteau	Series 2, Episode 5: "Judgement Day"	ABC
**1992** (34th)	Sean Scully	Phoenix	Ian "Goose" Cochrane	Series 1, Episode 10: "Blessed Are the Peacemakers"	ABC
**1993** (35th)
**1993** (35th)	**Peter Phelps**	**G.P.**	**Sam Hill**	**Series 5, Episode 20: "Exposed"**	**ABC**
**1993** (35th)	Jeremy Callaghan	Police Rescue	Const. Brian Morley	Series 3, Episode 10: "Whirlwind"	ABC
**1993** (35th)	John Howard	Joh's Jury	Hedley	—N/a	ABC
**1993** (35th)	Malcolm Kennard	Joh's Jury	Luke	—N/a	ABC
**1994** (36th)
**1994** (36th)	**Aaron Blabey**	**The Damnation of Harvey McHugh**	**Harvey McHugh**	**Episode 1: "Spray Misty for Me"**	**ABC**
**1994** (36th)	Hugh Baldwin	Heartbreak High	Graham Brown	Series 1, Episode 14	Network Ten
**1994** (36th)	Bradley Byquar	Heartland	Ricky Dyer	Episode 4	ABC
**1994** (36th)	Ernie Dingo	Heartland	Vincent Burunga	Episode 7	ABC
**1994** (36th)	Peter Kowitz	G.P.	Neil Hatton	Series 6, Episode 8: "Innocent Bystander"	ABC
**1995** (37th)
**1995** (37th)	**Colin Friels**	**Halifax f.p.**	**Kevin Tait**	**Series 1, Episode 5: "Hard Corps"**	**Nine Network**
**1995** (37th)	**Steven Vidler**	**Halifax f.p.**	**Steve Kingsley**	**Series 1, Episode 5: "Hard Corps"**	**Nine Network**
**1995** (37th)	Steve Bisley	Halifax f.p.	Jonah Cole	Series 1, Episode 3: "The Feeding"	Nine Network
**1995** (37th)	Grant Piro	Janus	Cassidy	Series 1, Episode 4: "A Rare Crushing Reversal"	ABC
**1995** (37th)	Richard Roxburgh	Halifax f.p.	Sergeant Paul Santos	Series 1, Episode 6: "Lies of the Mind"	Nine Network
**1996** (38th)
**1996** (38th)	**Tony Martin**	**Blue Murder**	**Arthur "Neddy" Smith**	—N/a	**ABC**
**1996** (38th)	Steve Bastoni	Police Rescue	Yiannis Angelopoulos	Series 5, Episode 8: "Tomorrow Never Knows"	ABC
**1996** (38th)	Marton Csokas	G.P.	Mr Paul Deacon	Series 8, Episode 8: "Ceremony of Innocence"	ABC
**1996** (38th)	Richard Roxburgh	Blue Murder	Roger Rogerson	—N/a	ABC
**1997** (39th)
**1997** (39th)	**David Wenham**	**Simone de Beauvoir's Babies**	**Ian**	—N/a	**ABC**
**1997** (39th)	Marcus Graham	Good Guys, Bad Guys	Elvis Maginnis	—N/a	Nine Network
**1997** (39th)	Geoff Morrell	Fallen Angels	Jack Landers	Series 1, Episode 15: "Pig in Shit"	ABC
**1997** (39th)	Jeremy Sims	Kangaroo Palace	Jack Gill	—N/a	Seven Network
**1998** (40th)
**1998** (40th)	**Stephen Dillane**	**Kings in Grass Castles**	**Patsy**	—N/a	**Seven Network**
**1998** (40th)	Shane Connor	Halifax f.p.	Ray	Series 3, Episode 3: "Afraid of the Dark"	Nine Network
**1998** (40th)	Tony Martin	Wildside	Detective Bill McCoy	—N/a †	ABC
**1998** (40th)	David Wenham	SeaChange	Daniel Della Bosca	Series 1, Episode 9: "Balls and Friggin' Good Luck"	ABC
**1999** (41st)
**1999** (41st)	**Jeremy Sims**	**Aftershocks**	**John Constable**	—N/a	**SBS**
**1999** (41st)	John Howard	SeaChange	Bob Jelly	Series 2, Episode 13: "Law and Order"	ABC
**1999** (41st)	Samuel Johnson	Wildside	Troy Cunningham	Series 2, Episode 19	ABC
**1999** (41st)	David Tredinnick	Halifax f.p.	David Neilson	Series 4, Episode 2: "Swimming with Sharks"	Nine Network
**2000** (42nd)
**2000** (42nd)	**Geoff Morrell**	**Grass Roots**	**Col Dunkley**	**Series 1, Episode 8: "The Whole Year"**	**ABC**
**2000** (42nd)	Tom Long	SeaChange	Angus Kabiri	Series 3, Episode 2: "How Much Greener Was My Neighbour's Valley"	ABC
**2000** (42nd)	Geoff Morrell	Grass Roots	Col Dunkley	Series 1, Episode 7: "Late July, Friday 4pm to 10.30pm"	ABC
**2000** (42nd)	Rhys Muldoon	Grass Roots	Greg Dominelli	Series 1, Episode 7: "Late July, Friday 4pm to 10.30pm"	ABC
**2001** (43rd)
**2001** (43rd)	**Samuel Johnson**	**The Secret Life of Us**	**Evan Wylde**	—N/a †	**Network Ten**
**2001** (43rd)	Nicholas Bell	The Games	Nicholas	—N/a †	ABC
**2001** (43rd)	John Howard	SeaChange	Bob Jelly	—N/a †	ABC
**2001** (43rd)	William McInnes	SeaChange	Max Connors	—N/a †	ABC
**2002** (44th)
**2002** (44th)	**Joel Edgerton**	**The Secret Life of Us**	**Will McGill**	—N/a †	**Network Ten**
**2002** (44th)	Shane Bourne	MDA	Bill "Happy" Henderson	—N/a †	ABC
**2002** (44th)	Tom Long	Young Lions	Det Snr Constable Guy "Guido" Martin	—N/a †	Nine Network
**2002** (44th)	Peter O'Brien	White Collar Blue	Detective Joe Hill	—N/a †	Network Ten

=== Best Performance by an Actor in a Telefeature or Mini Series (2000–2001) ===
Year	Actor	Program	Character(s)	Episode/Series	Network
**2000** (42nd)
**2000** (42nd)	**Andy Anderson**	**Halifax f.p.**	**Laurie Downes**	**Series 5, Episode 1: "A Person of Interest"**	**Nine Network**
**2000** (42nd)	Simon Baker	Secret Men's Business	Andy Greville	—N/a	ABC
**2000** (42nd)	Nicholas Eadie	Halifax f.p.	Simon Laser	Series 5, Episode 3: "A Hate Worse Than Death"	Nine Network
**2000** (42nd)	Joel Edgerton	The Secret Life of Us	Will McGill	Series 1	Network Ten
**2001** (43rd)
**2001** (43rd)	**David Field**	**My Husband, My Killer**	**Bill Vandenberg**	—N/a	**Network Ten**
**2001** (43rd)	Simon Lyndon	My Brother Jack	Jack Meredith	—N/a	Network Ten
**2001** (43rd)	William McInnes	My Brother Jack	Mr Meredith	—N/a	Network Ten
**2001** (43rd)	Geoff Morrell	Changi	Dr Rowdy Lawson	—N/a	ABC

=== Best Actor in a Leading Role in a Television Drama or Comedy (2003–2004) ===
Year	Actor	Program	Character(s)	Episode/Series	Network
**2003** (45th)
**2003** (45th)	**Shane Bourne**	**MDA**	**Bill "Happy" Henderson**	**Series 2**	**ABC**
**2003** (45th)	Ray Barrett	After the Deluge	Old Cliff Kirby	—N/a	Network Ten
**2003** (45th)	Geoff Morrell	Grass Roots	Col Dunkley	Series 2	ABC
**2003** (45th)	Glenn Robbins	Kath & Kim	Kel Knight	Series 2	ABC
**2004** (46th)
**2004** (46th)	**Abe Forsythe**	**Marking Time**	**Hal Fleming**	—N/a	**ABC**
**2004** (46th)	Geoff Morrell	Marking Time	Geoff Fleming	—N/a	ABC
**2004** (46th)	Sam Neill	Jessica	Richard Runche	—N/a	Network Ten
**2004** (46th)	David Wenham	The Brush-Off	Murray Whelan	—N/a	Seven Network

=== Best Lead Actor in Television (2005) ===
Year	Actor	Program	Character(s)	Episode/Series	Network
**2005** (47th)
**2005** (47th)	**Shane Bourne**	**MDA**	**Bill "Happy" Henderson**	**Series 3**	**ABC**
**2005** (47th)	Chris Lilley	We Can Be Heroes: Finding The Australian of the Year	Daniel Sims, Ja'mie King, Pat Mullins, Phil Olivetti and Ricky Wong	—N/a	ABC
**2005** (47th)	Alex O'Loughlin	The Incredible Journey of Mary Bryant	Will Bryant	—N/a	Network Ten
**2005** (47th)	Daniel Wyllie	Love My Way	Charlie Jackson	Series 1	Fox8

=== Best Lead Actor in a Television Drama (2006–current) ===
Year	Actor	Program	Character(s)	Episode/Series	Network
**2006** (48th)
**2006** (48th)	**David Wenham**	**Answered by Fire**	**Mark Waldman**	—N/a	**ABC**
**2006** (48th)	Charles Passi	RAN Remote Area Nurse	Russ Gaibui	—N/a	SBS
**2006** (48th)	Richard Roxburgh	The Silence	Richard Treloar	—N/a	ABC
**2006** (48th)	Daniel Wyllie	Love My Way	Charlie Jackson	Series 2	W
**2007** (49th)
**2007** (49th)	**Stephen Curry**	**The King**	**Graham Kennedy**	—N/a	**TV1**
**2007** (49th)	Khan Chittenden	Dangerous	Dean	—N/a	Fox8
**2007** (49th)	Daniel Frederiksen	Bastard Boys	Greg Combet	—N/a	ABC
**2007** (49th)	Ben Mendelsohn	Love My Way	Lewis Feingold	Series 3	Showcase
**2008** (50th)
**2008** (50th)	**Gyton Grantley**	**Underbelly**	**Carl Williams**	—N/a	**Nine Network**
**2008** (50th)	Don Hany	East West 101	Detective Zane Malik	Series 1	SBS One
**2008** (50th)	William McInnes	East West 101	Detective Sergeant Ray Crowley	Series 1	SBS One
**2008** (50th)	Callan Mulvey	Rush	Brendan "Josh" Joshua	Series 1	Network Ten
**2009** (51st)
**2009** (51st)	**Roy Billing**	**Underbelly: A Tale of Two Cities**	**Robert Trimbole**	—N/a	**Nine Network**
**2009** (51st)	Don Hany	East West 101	Detective Zane Malik	Series 2	SBS One
**2009** (51st)	Robert Menzies	3 Acts of Murder	Arthur Upfield	—N/a	ABC
**2009** (51st)	Dougray Scott	False Witness	Ian Porter	—N/a	UKTV
**2010** (52nd)
**2010** (52nd)	**Richard Roxburgh**	**Hawke**	**Bob Hawke**	—N/a	**Network Ten**
**2010** (52nd)	Garry McDonald	A Model Daughter: The Killing of Caroline Byrne	Tony Byrne	—N/a	Network Ten
**2010** (52nd)	Corey McKernan^{[C]}	Lockie Leonard	Phillip Leonard	—N/a	Nine Network
**2010** (52nd)	Aaron Pedersen	The Circuit	Drew Ellis	Series 2	SBS
**AACTA Awards**
**2011** (1st)
**2011** (1st)	**Alex Dimitriades**	**The Slap**	**Harry**	—N/a	**ABC1**
**2011** (1st)	Rob Carlton	Paper Giants: The Birth of Cleo	Kerry Packer	—N/a	ABC1
**2011** (1st)	Don Hany	East West 101	Detective Zane Malik	Season 3, Episode 1: "The Hero's Standard"	SBS One
**2011** (1st)	Jonathan LaPaglia	The Slap	Hector	—N/a	ABC1
**2012** (2nd)
**2012** (2nd)	**Richard Roxburgh**	**Rake**	**Cleaver Greene**	**Series 2**	**ABC1**
**2012** (2nd)	Jimi Bani	Mabo	Eddie Mabo	—N/a	ABC1
**2012** (2nd)	Anthony Hayes	Devil's Dust	Bernie Banton	—N/a	ABC1
**2012** (2nd)	Lachy Hulme	Howzat! Kerry Packer's War	Kerry Packer	—N/a	Nine Network
**2013** (3rd)
**2013** (3rd)	**Lachy Hulme**	**Power Games: The Packer-Murdoch War**	**Frank Packer**	—N/a	**Nine Network**
**2013** (3rd)	Ernie Dingo	Redfern Now	Ernie Johnson	Series 2, Episode 6: "Dogs of War"	ABC1
**2013** (3rd)	Remy Hii	Better Man	Van Tuong Nguyen	—N/a	SBS
**2013** (3rd)	Meyne Wyatt	Redfern Now	Justin	Series 2, Episode 3: "Babe in Arms"	ABC1
**2014** (4th)
**2014** (4th)	**Ashley Zukerman**	**The Code**			**ABC**
**2014** (4th)	Luke Arnold	INXS: Never Tear Us Apart			Seven Network
**2014** (4th)	Richard Roxburgh	Rake		Series 3	ABC
**2014** (4th)	Dan Spielman	The Code			ABC
**2015** (5th)
**2015** (5th)	**Joel Jackson**	**Peter Allen: Not the Boy Next Door**			**Seven Network**
**2015** (5th)	Wayne Blair	Redfern Now			ABC
**2015** (5th)	Joel Jackson	Deadline Gallipoli			FOXTEL
**2015** (5th)	Oliver Jackson-Cohen	The Secret River			ABC
**2016** (6th)
**2016** (6th)	**Samuel Johnson**	**Molly**			Seven Network
**2016** (6th)	Matt Nable	Barracuda			ABC
**2016** (6th)	Richard Roxburgh	Rake			ABC
**2016** (6th)	Ashley Zukerman	The Code			ABC
**2017** (7th)
**2017** (7th)	**Hugo Weaving**	**Seven Types of Ambiguity**			ABC
**2017** (7th)	David Dencik	Top of the Lake: China Girl			Foxtel/BBC First
**2017** (7th)	Sean Keenan	Wake in Fright			Network Ten
**2017** (7th)	Richard Roxburgh	Blue Murder: Killer Cop			Seven Network
**2018** (8th)
**2018** (8th)	**Damon Herriman**	**Riot**			ABC
**2018** (8th)	Aaron Pedersen	Mystery Road			ABC
**2018** (8th)	Richard Roxburgh	Rake			ABC1
**2018** (8th)	Scott Ryan	Mr Inbetween			FX
**2018** (8th)	Hazem Shammas	Safe Harbour			SBS
**2019** (9th)
**2019** (9th)	**Scott Ryan**	**Mr Inbetween**	Ray Shoesmith		FX
**2019** (9th)	Patrick Brammall	Glitch	Sgt. James Hayes		ABC
**2019** (9th)	Bryan Brown	Bloom	Ray Reed		Stan
**2019** (9th)	Ewen Leslie	The Cry	Alistair Robertson		ABC
**2019** (9th)	Sam Reid	Lambs of God	Father Ignatius		Foxtel
**2020** (10th)
**2020** (10th)	**Fayssal Bazzi**	**Stateless**	Ameer		ABC
**2020** (10th)	Bryan Brown	Bloom	Ray Reed		Stan
**2020** (10th)	Jai Courtney	Stateless	Cam Sandford		ABC
**2020** (10th)	Ewen Leslie	Operation Buffalo	Major Leo Carmichael		ABC
**2020** (10th)	Aaron Pedersen	Mystery Road	Jay Swan		ABC
**2021** (11th)
**2021** (11th)	**Scott Ryan**	**Mr Inbetween**	Ray Shoesmith		Fox Showcase
**2021** (11th)	Rudi Dharmalingam	Wakefield	Nikhil 'Nik' Katira		ABC
**2021** (11th)	Guy Pearce	Jack Irish	Jack Irish		ABC
**2021** (11th)	Sam Reid	The Newsreader	Dale Jennings		ABC
**2021** (11th)	Richard Roxburgh	Fires	Duncan Simpson		ABC
**2022** (12th)
**2022** (12th)	**Mark Coles Smith**	Mystery Road	Jay Swan	Season 3	ABC
**2022** (12th)	Jamie Dornan	The Tourist	The Man/Elliott Stanley		Stan
**2022** (12th)	James Majoos	Heartbreak High	Darren Rivers		Netflix
**2022** (12th)	Sam Neill	The Twelve	Brett Colby		Fox Showcase
**2022** (12th)	Hugo Weaving	Love Me	Glen Mathieson		BINGE, Foxtel

== See also ==
- AACTA Award for Best Guest or Supporting Actor in a Television Drama
- AACTA Awards

== Notes ==
A: From 1958–2010, the awards were held during the year of the films release. However, the 1974–75 awards was held in 1975 for films released in 1974 and 1975, and the first AACTA Awards was held in 2012 for films released in 2011.
B: All sources used in this article do not mention the name of John Hargreaves' character in The Lizard King.
C: The official AACTA website lists Corey McKernan's nomination in 2010 for The Legend of Enyo. However, there are no sources which indicates McKernan's involvement with the aforementioned series, and the original nominations list from the AFI website has him short listed for his performance in Lockie Leonard.
