= Land Mines - A Love Story =

2005 documentary film

- Directed by: Dennis O'Rourke
- Written by: Dennis O'Rourke
- Produced by: Dennis O'Rourke
- Starring: Habiba; Shah
- Edited by: Ruth Cullen; Andrea Lang
- Release date: 2005
- Running time: 71 minutes
- Country: Australia
- Language: English

Land Mines - A Love Story is a 2005 documentary film written and directed by Dennis O'Rourke. It looks at an Afghan couple who are living with land mine injuries.

== Reception ==
Evan Williams from The Australian gave it 4 stars saying "It's a little jewel of a film: gentle, delicate, probing." Writing in the Sydney Morning Herald Paul Byrnes concludes "There's a constant tension between his desire to editorialise and his wish to observe, but it's quietly productive. The film is neither all head nor all heart, more a galvanising balance of the two." Also in the Sydney Morning Herald Jason Steger writes "This is an extraordinary documentary, scrupulously filmed, sensitively structured. It will enlighten you, stir you and make you cry." Variety's Russell Edwards states "O’Rourke is occasionally manipulative, but his humanistic approach to this highly charged subject allows the natural charm of the struggling Afghani couple to shine."

== Awards ==
- 2005 Australian Film Institute Awards
  - Best Documentary - Dennis O'Rourke - won
