= List of 2005 box office number-one films in Australia =

This is a list of films which placed number-one at the box office in Australia during 2005. Amounts are in Australian dollars. Also included are the positions at the box office other films opened at. Quite a number of these are films from the previous year due to normal Australian film distribution delays. The number a film opens at does not necessarily denote its highest placement at the box office, but is intended as an indication and a guide to what theatrically released films opened and when.

== Number-one films ==
| † | This implies the highest-grossing movie of the year. |

| # | Week ending | Film | Box office | Openings |
|---|---|---|---|---|
| 1 | 5 January 2005 | Meet the Fockers | $8,993,413 | Finding Neverland (#4), Raise Your Voice (#8) |
| 2 | 12 January 2005 | Meet the Fockers | $5,546,235 | The SpongeBob SquarePants Movie (#3), Racing Stripes (#4), Ladder 49 (#5), Deck Dogz (#15) |
| 3 | 19 January 2005 | Meet the Fockers | $3,796,369 | Elektra (#3), After the Sunset (#8), Kinsey (#15) |
| 4 | 26 January 2005 | Meet the Fockers | $2,756,156 | Alexander (#2), Alfie (#7) |
| 5 | 2 February 2005 | Closer | $2,196,876 | Ray (#3), Sideways (#7) |
| 6 | 9 February 2005 | Closer | $1,437,301 | Million Dollar Baby (#2), Sky Captain and the World of Tomorrow (#6), Seed of Chucky (#9) |
| 7 | 16 February 2005 | The Aviator | $2,582,876 | Hide and Seek (#2), Cellular (#7), Vera Drake (#17) |
| 8 | 23 February 2005 | The Aviator | $1,869,409 | Bride and Prejudice (#2), Spanglish (#4), House of Flying Daggers (#5) |
| 9 | 2 March 2005 | Constantine | $3,759,269 | Hotel Rwanda (#12), My House in Umbria (#13) |
| 10 | 9 March 2005 | Hitch | $4,627,642 | The Door in the Floor (#14), Luther (#19) |
| 11 | 16 March 2005 | Hitch | $3,130,822 | Be Cool (#2), Are We There Yet? (#4), Friday Night Lights (#8), Ong-Bak: Muay Thai Warrior (#12), Riding Giants (#20) |
| 12 | 23 March 2005 | Hitch | $2,342,005 | Hating Alison Ashley (#4), Being Julia (#8), The Life Aquatic with Steve Zissou (#10) |
| 13 | 30 March 2005 | Robots | $4,211,917 | Miss Congeniality 2: Armed and Fabulous (#2), The Ring Two (#3), The Pacifier (#5), Ladies in Lavender (#9), Bad Education (#15), Maria Full of Grace (#19), Son of the Mask (#20) |
| 14 | 6 April 2005 | Robots | $2,798,977 | Assault on Precinct 13 (#6) |
| 15 | 13 April 2005 | The Pacifier | $2,720,012 | Sahara (#3), Guess Who (#4) |
| 16 | 20 April 2005 | The Pacifier | $2,666,529 | The Interpreter (#3), The Amityville Horror (#4), Hostage (#7) |
| 17 | 27 April 2005 | The Interpreter | $1,915,976 | In Good Company (#3), White Noise (#7), The Extra (#10), Downfall (#12), Fat Albert (#13), Three Dollars (#14) |
| 18 | 4 May 2005 | The Hitchhiker's Guide to the Galaxy | $3,496,717 | xXx^{2}: The Next Level (#2), Birth (#13) |
| 19 | 11 May 2005 | Kingdom of Heaven | $3,464,979 | You and Your Stupid Mate (#8) |
| 20 | 18 May 2005 | Kingdom of Heaven | $2,402,289 | The Upside of Anger (#3), Boogeyman (#15) |
| 21 | 25 May 2005 | Star Wars: Episode III – Revenge of the Sith † | $16,217,383 | |
| 22 | 1 June 2005 | Star Wars: Episode III – Revenge of the Sith † | $7,915,053 | Coach Carter (#2), The Wedding Date (#3), Melinda and Melinda (#13), We Don't Live Here Anymore (#15), 2046 (#18), Bunty Aur Babli (#20) |
| 23 | 8 June 2005 | Star Wars: Episode III – Revenge of the Sith † | $4,478,452 | The Longest Yard (#2), A Lot Like Love (#3), The Machinist (#14) |
| 24 | 15 June 2005 | Mr. & Mrs. Smith | $8,977,947 | The Assassination of Richard Nixon (#13), Peaches (#14) |
| 25 | 22 June 2005 | Madagascar | $6,250,327 | Batman Begins (#2), Pooh's Heffalump Movie (#15) |
| 26 | 29 June 2005 | Madagascar | $5,726,462 | Herbie: Fully Loaded (#4), A Good Woman (#8), The Sisterhood of the Traveling Pants (#9), Paheli (#15) |
| 27 | 6 July 2005 | War of the Worlds | $9,201,701 | Oyster Farmer (#11), My Summer of Love (#12), The Beat That My Heart Skipped (#19) |
| 28 | 13 July 2005 | Fantastic Four | $5,433,418 | Bewitched (#2), The Yes Men (#17) |
| 29 | 20 July 2005 | Fantastic Four | $2,886,431 | Sin City (#2), House of Wax (#7), Because of Winn-Dixie (#17) |
| 30 | 27 July 2005 | Monster-in-Law | $3,220,104 | Flight of the Phoenix (#6) |
| 31 | 3 August 2005 | The Island | $2,497,846 | Layer Cake (#8), Me and My Sister (#17) |
| 32 | 10 August 2005 | The Island | $1,703,774 | Land of the Dead (#3), Code 46 (#18) |
| 33 | 17 August 2005 | Wedding Crashers | $5,760,765 | Kicking & Screaming (#4), Kung Fu Hustle (#5), Millions (#12), The Jacket (#13), Mangal Pandey: The Rising (#14) |
| 34 | 24 August 2005 | Wedding Crashers | $3,829,155 | The Skeleton Key (#2), Unleashed (#3), Look Both Ways (#7), Mysterious Skin (#15), Turtles Can Fly (#18) |
| 35 | 31 August 2005 | Wedding Crashers | $2,723,885 | Lords of Dogtown (#8) |
| 36 | 7 September 2005 | Charlie and the Chocolate Factory | $8,785,146 | Red Eye (#3), P.S. (#10), No Entry (#16) |
| 37 | 14 September 2005 | Charlie and the Chocolate Factory | $5,636,804 | Stealth (#2), The Perfect Catch (#6), Little Fish (#7), Sky High (#8), The Adventures of Sharkboy and Lavagirl in 3-D (#9), Salaam Namaste (#13) |
| 38 | 21 September 2005 | The Dukes of Hazzard | $4,358,774 | Wallace & Gromit: The Curse of the Were-Rabbit (#3), The Perfect Man (#10), Murderball (#16) |
| 39 | 28 September 2005 | Charlie and the Chocolate Factory | $2,911,168 | Deuce Bigalow: European Gigolo (#2), Howl's Moving Castle (#12) |
| 40 | 5 October 2005 | Cinderella Man | $2,061,706 | Serenity (#7), Transporter 2 (#8), Mad Hot Ballroom (#13), The Queen of Sheba's Pearls (#17) |
| 41 | 12 October 2005 | The 40-Year-Old Virgin | $2,877,061 | Must Love Dogs (#3), The Proposition (#11) |
| 42 | 19 October 2005 | In Her Shoes | $2,296,362 | Night Watch (#6), The Devil's Rejects (#17), Enron: The Smartest Guys in the Room (#18) |
| 43 | 26 October 2005 | Pride & Prejudice | $2,092,274 | Into the Blue (#4), Dark Water (#8) |
| 44 | 2 November 2005 | Doom | $1,909,552 | The Exorcism of Emily Rose (#3), Me and You and Everyone We Know (#17) |
| 45 | 9 November 2005 | Wolf Creek | $1,811,448 | Elizabethtown (#2), Stay (#9), Gallipoli (#19) |
| 46 | 16 November 2005 | Flightplan | $2,943,589 | Kiss Kiss Bang Bang (#5), Four Brothers (#7) |
| 47 | 23 November 2005 | Saw II | $2,401,084 | Corpse Bride (#3), Prime (#4), The Constant Gardener (#5), Bee Season (#19) |
| 48 | 30 November 2005 | The Brothers Grimm | $1,570,397 | The Cave (#9), Thumbsucker (#18) |
| 49 | 7 December 2005 | Harry Potter and the Goblet of Fire | $15,752,194 | Domino (#4), Waiting... (#9), Shopgirl (#12) |
| 50 | 14 December 2005 | Harry Potter and the Goblet of Fire | $7,200,602 | King Kong (#2), Bad News Bears (#9) |
| 51 | 21 December 2005 | King Kong | $7,446,868 | Good Night, and Good Luck (#7), Joyeux Noël (#17) |
| 52 | 28 December 2005 | The Chronicles of Narnia: The Lion, the Witch and the Wardrobe | $8,754,491 | Cheaper by the Dozen 2 (#4), Fun with Dick and Jane (#5), Just Like Heaven (#6), The Legend of Zorro (#7), Mrs Henderson Presents (#8), Broken Flowers (#9), Russian Dolls (#18) |

== See also ==
- List of Australian films – Australian films by year
- 2005 in film
