= Love My Way =

Australian television series

- Love My Way intertitle
- Genre: Melodrama
- Created by: John Edwards; Claudia Karvan; Jacquelin Perske
- Starring: Claudia Karvan; Asher Keddie; Brendan Cowell; Dan Wyllie; Sam Worthington; Max Cullen; Ben Mendelsohn; Lynette Curran; Justine Clarke; Sam Parsonson
- Country of origin: Australia
- Original language: English
- No. of seasons: 3
- No. of episodes: 30

Production
- Executive producers: Kim Vecera; Mike Sneesby
- Running time: 50 minutes
- Production company: Southern Star Group

Original release
- Network: FOX8 (Season 1); W. (Season 2); Showtime (Season 3)
- Release: 22 November 2004 – 19 March 2007

Related
- The Secret Life of Us (2001–2005)

Love My Way is an Australian television drama series created by John Edwards and Claudia Karvan, which premiered on Fox8 on 22 November 2004, before moving to W. for its second season, and Showtime for its third and final season, concluding on 19 March 2007. The series stars Claudia Karvan, Asher Keddie, Brendan Cowell, Daniel Wyllie, Lynette Curran, Alex Cook, Max Cullen and Gillian Jones. It was produced by Southern Star Group for Foxtel, with Kim Vecera and Mike Sneesby serving as executive producers for the series.

The series garnered critical acclaim, where it became the recipient of several major Australian awards and nominations, including the AFI award, in which it won for Best Television Drama Series for each of its three seasons, as well as award wins at the TV Week Logie Awards, Australian Writers' Guild Awards (AWGIE), and the ASTRA Awards.

== Premise ==
Set in Sydney, Love My Way was about a group of 30-somethings dealing with the ups and downs of life. The series revolves around an extended family unit - Frankie Paige and Charlie Jackson are the separated parents of Lou, and Frankie also lives with Charlie's brother, Tom. As the series began, Charlie's new wife Julia is about to have their first child. Frankie's mother, Di and Charlie's mother, Brenda, and father, Gerry, also have a strong presence in the ongoing story, as does Julia's ex-lover Howard, who enters into a relationship with Frankie.

== Production ==
Love My Way was produced by John Edwards of the Southern Star Group, and Claudia Karvan, who also played the leading role of Frankie Paige in the series. Initially intended to be picked up by Network Ten, which did not proceed due to budget concerns, subscription service Foxtel commissioned a first season on ten episodes in 2003, with pre-production lasting 18 months before filming began on 21 June 2004.

When the series was launched, much was made of the connection between Love My Way and The Secret Life of Us: both sharing a star, as well as significant creative talent (Edwards and Perske both were involved in Secret Life, as were series writers like Tony McNamara). However, the series is not a continuation of Secret Life, although it does share some thematic concerns. When developing Love My Way, Edwards and Karvan did, in fact, explore the possibility of a spin-off series set in a hospital, featuring Karvan's character Alex, and Rex (played by Vince Colosimo) – a project which never came to fruition.

Foxtel's director of television and marketing, Brian Walsh, stated that the series marked the first time that the network had the freedom to produce a drama exclusively aimed at subscribers, as he remarked that it drew inspiration from several HBO series, including Six Feet Under, The Sopranos and Sex and the City, commenting "[he] wanted to carve out a piece of TV drama that was edgy, daring, provocative".

The series was filmed at locations in Sydney, including The Sunday Telegraph office, while some scenes were filmed on location at the infamously dangerous Cromwell Park, as there was enough money in the budget to cover council fees. Another advantage of producing a pay TV drama was the freedom to push the boundaries, such as the inclusion of regular swearing, drug use and sexual scenes and references – content which is limited in free-to-air shows.

In March 2005, Foxtel commissioned a 12-episode second season, with Austar joining the production as co-investors. The series was renewed for a third season in May 2006, and filming commenced in December 2006.

The star of the series, Claudia Karvan, was also a co-producer, along with having written for the series. Brendan Cowell, who appears as Tom, also worked as scriptwriter for two episodes of seasons 1 and three episodes of season 2.

On first airing, the theme song originally by The Psychedelic Furs, this time covered by Magic Dirt, played over the title sequence.

== Cast ==
=== Main ===
- Claudia Karvan as Francesca 'Frankie' Paige
- Asher Keddie as Julia Jackson
- Brendan Cowell as Tom Jackson
- Daniel Wyllie as Charlie Jackson
- Lynette Curran as Brenda Jackson
- Alex Cook as Louise 'Lou' Jackson Paige
- Gillian Jones as Di Paige
- Max Cullen as Gerry Jackson

=== Recurring / guests ===
- Abby Earl as Chloe
- Adelaide Clemens as Harper
- Alan David Lee as Father Chris
- Alex Dimitriades as Julien
- Angela Punch McGregor as Angela Morris
- Ben Mendelsohn as Lewis Feingold
- Claire van der Boom as Billie
- Damon Herriman as George Wagstaffe
- Ewen Leslie as Duc
- Ian Bliss as Darren Longman
- Josef Ber as Bruce
- Justine Clarke as Simone
- Kym Gyngell as Curtis Manning
- Leah Purcell as Caroline Syron
- Mariel McClorey as Katie
- Matthew Le Nevez as Jai
- Paula Arundell as Gina
- Sacha Horler as P.K.
- Sam Parsonson as Dylan Feingold
- Sam Worthington as Howard Light
- Steven Vidler as Steven
- Susie Porter as Christine

== Episodes ==
Season	Episodes	Originally released		
Season	Episodes	First released	Last released	Network
1	10	22 November 2004	31 January 2005	FOX8
2	12	5 February 2006	23 April 2006	W.
3	8	26 February 2007	19 March 2007	Showtime

(Episode information retrieved from Australian Television Information Archive).

=== Season 1 (2004-05) ===
No. overall	No. in season	Title	Directed by	Written by	Original release date
1	1	"Don't Tell Me Your Dreams"	Jessica Hobbs	Jacquelin Perske	22 November 2004
2	2	"What's In A Name"	Jessica Hobbs	Tony McNamara	22 November 2004
3	3	"Crazy Love"	Jessica Hobbs	Jacquelin Perske & Marissa Cooke	29 November 2004
4	4	"Spin Cycle"	Ian Watson	Brendan Cowell	6 December 2004
5	5	"Stick Sisters"	Ian Watson	Louise Fox	13 December 2004
6	6	"To Dance With Death"	Ian Watson	Fiona Seres	20 December 2004
7	7	"My Family Up A Tree"	Ian Watson	Brendan Cowell	10 January 2005
8	8	"A Different Planet"	Jessica Hobbs	Louise Fox	17 January 2005
9	9	"Only Mortal"	Jessica Hobbs	Jacquelin Perske	24 January 2005
10	10	"Garden Of Love"	Jessica Hobbs	Fiona Seres	31 January 2005

=== Season 2 (2006) ===
No. overall	No. in season	Title	Directed by	Written by	Original release date
11	1	"More To Tell"	Shirley Barrett	Jacquelin Perske	5 February 2006
12	2	"The Christmas Thing"	Shirley Barrett	Tony McNamara	12 February 2006
13	3	"When Wanting Works"	Shirley Barrett	Blake Ayshford	19 February 2006
14	4	"No Immunity"	Garth Davis	Louise Fox	26 February 2006
15	5	"Old Wounds"	Garth Davis	Fiona Seres	5 March 2006
16	6	"I Know You"	Garth Davis	Brendan Cowell	12 March 2006
17	7	"Tower of Love"	Geoff Bennett	Brendan Cowell, Fiona Seres & Tony McNamara	19 March 2006
18	8	"Crossing The Line"	Geoff Bennett	Sarah Lambert	26 March 2006
19	9	"Amphibians"	Geoff Bennett	Brendan Cowell	2 April 2006
20	10	"One Big Happy"	Omar Madha	Tony McNamara	9 April 2006
21	11	"Five Minutes of Fame"	Omar Madha	Fiona Seres	16 April 2006
22	12	"You're Almost There"	Omar Madha	Lousie Fox & Jacquelin Perske	23 April 2006

=== Season 3 (2007) ===
No. overall	No. in season	Title	Directed by	Written by	Original release date
23	1	"I'm The King of the Castle"	Ian Watson	Brendan Cowell	26 February 2007
24	2	"Cold Blooded Creatures"	Ian Watson	Tony McNamara	26 February 2007
25	3	"Say What You Mean"	Shirley Barrett	Fiona Seres	5 March 2007
26	4	"Together Apart"	Shirley Barrett	Louise Fox	5 March 2007
27	5	"The Cemetery Gates"	Kate Dennis	Brendan Cowell	12 March 2007
28	6	"Cars Without Brakes"	Kate Dennis	Tony McNamara	12 March 2007
29	7	"Running With Crabs"	Emma Freeman	Fiona Seres	19 March 2007
30	8	"And in the End"	Emma Freeman	Brendan Cowell, Tony McNamara & Fiona Seres	19 March 2007

== Reception ==
=== Critical reception ===
Love My Way has received critical acclaim throughout its run.

In a review for The Sydney Morning Herald, prior to broadcast of the second season, Robin Oliver stated that "The unrivalled television drama production of 2004 returns with fresh episodes and a verdict is easily reached: better than ever"... "Love My Way positively glows with that precious and often elusive ingredient, the ordinariness of life." Of the cast, he said, "The old gang is in position, notably Tom, Charlie and Julia Jackson (Brendan Cowell, Dan Wyllie and Asher Keddie). Lovely work, but it is the art of unexplored nuance - the parked car, the fingerprinting - that makes Jacqueline Perske's opening script a triumph."

David Knox of TV Tonight, gave the series a positive review prior to the season three premiere, showing praise to the cast performances, commenting "as with previous seasons of LMW the performances are roundly excellent", in particular, he mentioned "[Ben] Mendelsohn shines in a role that reminds us he is all too rarely seen. [Asher] Keddie’s Julia teeters on the brink of vulnerability and anal-retentiveness that shows she is no one-dimensional performer."

=== Awards and nominations ===
Award	Year	Category	Recipient	Result	Ref.
AFI Awards/ AACTA Awards (Note: The Australian Film Institute renamed the AFI Awards to the AACTA Awards.)	2005 (Note: AFI Awards for Season 1.)	Best Drama Series	John Edwards, Claudia Karvan	Won	
AFI Awards/ AACTA Awards	2005	Best Lead Actor in Television	Dan Wyllie	Nominated	
AFI Awards/ AACTA Awards	2005	Best Lead Actress in Television	Claudia Karvan	Won	
AFI Awards/ AACTA Awards	2005	Best Guest or Supporting Actor in Television	Max Cullen (S1:E8))	Won	
AFI Awards/ AACTA Awards	2005	Best Direction in Television	Jessica Hobbs (S1:E8)	Won	
AFI Awards/ AACTA Awards	2005	Best Screenplay in Television	Jacquelin Perske (S1:E9)	Won	
AFI Awards/ AACTA Awards	2005	Outstanding Achievement in Craft in Television	Louis Irving (cinematography)	Nominated	
AFI Awards/ AACTA Awards	2006 (Note: AFI Awards for Season 2.)	Best Drama Series	John Edwards, Claudia Karvan, Jacquelin Perske	Won	
AFI Awards/ AACTA Awards	2006	Best Direction in Television	Shirley Barrett (S2:E11)	Nominated	
AFI Awards/ AACTA Awards	2006	Best Lead Actor in Television Drama	Dan Wyllie	Nominated	
AFI Awards/ AACTA Awards	2006	Best Lead Actress in Television Drama	Claudia Karvan	Nominated	
AFI Awards/ AACTA Awards	2006	Best Lead Actress in Television Drama	Asher Keddie	Nominated	
AFI Awards/ AACTA Awards	2006	Best Screenplay in Television	Jacqueline Perske (S2:E11)	Nominated	
AFI Awards/ AACTA Awards	2007 (Note: AFI Awards for Season 3.)	Best Television Drama Series	John Edwards, Claudia Karvan	Won	
AFI Awards/ AACTA Awards	2007	Best Lead Actor in Television Drama	Ben Mendelsohn	Nominated	
AFI Awards/ AACTA Awards	2007	Best Lead Actress in Television Drama	Claudia Karvan	Won	
AFI Awards/ AACTA Awards	2007	Best Guest or Supporting Actress in Television Drama	Justine Clarke	Nominated	
AFI Awards/ AACTA Awards	2007	Best Screenplay in Television	Tony McNamara (S3:E6)	Nominated	
AFI Awards/ AACTA Awards	2015	Subscription Television 20th Anniversary Award for Best Drama	Love My Way	Won	
ASTRA Awards	2005 (Note: ASTRA Awards for Season 1 episodes that aired in 2004.)	Most Outstanding Australian Production - General Entertainment	Love My Way (John Edwards)	Won	
ASTRA Awards	2005	Most Outstanding On Camera Performance - Male	Dan Wyllie	Won	
ASTRA Awards	2005	Most Outstanding On Camera Performance - Female	Claudia Karvan	Won	
ASTRA Awards	2006 (Note: ASTRA Awards for the remaining Season 1 episodes that aired in 2005.)	Most Outstanding Drama Program	Love My Way (John Edwards)	Won	
ASTRA Awards	2006	Most Outstanding Performance by an Actor – Male	Dan Wyllie	Won	
ASTRA Awards	2006	Most Outstanding Performance by an Actor – Female	Claudia Karvan	Won	
ASTRA Awards	2007 (Note: ASTRA Awards for Season 2.)	Most Outstanding Drama Program	Love My Way (Note: tied with Stupid, Stupid Man.)	Won	
ASTRA Awards	2007	Most Outstanding Performance by an Actor – Male	Dan Wyllie	Won	
ASTRA Awards	2007	Most Outstanding Performance by an Actor – Male	Ben Mendelsohn	Nominated	
ASTRA Awards	2007	Most Outstanding Performance by an Actor – Female	Claudia Karvan	Nominated	
ASTRA Awards	2007	Most Outstanding Performance by an Actor – Female	Asher Keddie	Won	
ASTRA Awards	2008 (Note: ASTRA Awards for Season 3.)	Most Outstanding Drama	Love My Way	Nominated	
ASTRA Awards	2008	Most Outstanding Performance by an Actor – Male	Brendan Cowell	Nominated	
ASTRA Awards	2008	Most Outstanding Performance by an Actor – Male	Dan Wyllie	Nominated	
ASTRA Awards	2008	Most Outstanding Performance by an Actor – Male	Ben Mendelsohn	Nominated	
ASTRA Awards	2008	Most Outstanding Performance by an Actor – Female	Claudia Karvan	Won	
ASTRA Awards	2008	Most Outstanding Performance by an Actor – Female	Asher Keddie	Nominated	
ASTRA Awards	2008	Subscribers' Choice: Favourite Program	Love My Way	Nominated	
Australian Cinematographers Society Awards	2005	Best Cinematography in Television	Louis Irving	Nominated	
Australian Directors' Guild Awards	2007	Best Direction in a Television series	Kate Dennis (director) (S3:E6)	Nominated	
Australian Screen Editors Guild Awards	2007	Television Drama	Nick Holmes (S3:E6)	Nominated	
Australian Screen Sound Guild Awards	2005	Best Sound In A Drama Series		Nominated	
Australian Screen Sound Guild Awards	2006	Best Sound In A Drama Series		Nominated	
Australian Screen Sound Guild Awards	2007	Best Sound In A Drama Series		Nominated	
AWGIE Awards	2005	Television - Series	Louise Fox (S1:E8)	Won	
AWGIE Awards	2005	Television - Series	Jacquelin Perske (S1:E9)	Nominated	
AWGIE Awards	2006	Television - Series	Brendan Cowell (S2:E6)	Nominated	
AWGIE Awards	2007	Television - Series	Brendan Cowell (S3:E1)	Nominated	
AWGIE Awards	2007	Television - Series	Tony McNamara (S3:E2)	Won	
AWGIE Awards	2008	Television - Series	Brendan Cowell (S3:E6)	Nominated	
Logie Awards	2005 (Note: Logie Awards for Season 1.)	Most Outstanding Drama Series	Love My Way (John Edwards)	Won	
Logie Awards	2005	Most Outstanding Actor in a Drama Series	Brendan Cowell	Nominated	
Logie Awards	2005	Most Outstanding Actor in a Drama Series	Dan Wyllie	Nominated	
Logie Awards	2005	Most Outstanding Actress in a Drama Series	Claudia Karvan	Nominated	
Logie Awards	2005	Most Outstanding Actress in a Drama Series	Asher Keddie	Nominated	
Logie Awards	2006 (Note: Logie Awards for Season 2.)	Most Outstanding Drama Series	Love My Way (John Edwards)	Won	
Logie Awards	2006	Most Outstanding Actor in a Drama Series	Brendan Cowell	Nominated	
Logie Awards	2006	Most Outstanding Actor in a Drama Series	Dan Wyllie	Won	
Logie Awards	2006	Most Outstanding Actress in a Drama Series	Claudia Karvan	Won	
Logie Awards	2006	Most Outstanding Actress in a Drama Series	Asher Keddie	Nominated	
Logie Awards	2007 (Note: Logie Awards for Season 3.)	Most Outstanding Drama Series	Love My Way (John Edwards)	Won	
Logie Awards	2007	Most Popular Actor	Brendan Cowell	Nominated	
Logie Awards	2007	Most Outstanding Actor in a Drama Series	Ben Mendelsohn	Nominated	
Logie Awards	2007	Most Outstanding Actor in a Drama Series	Dan Wyllie	Nominated	
Logie Awards	2007	Most Outstanding Actress in a Drama Series	Claudia Karvan	Nominated	
Logie Awards	2007	Most Outstanding Actress in a Drama Series	Asher Keddie	Nominated	
Logie Awards	2007	Graham Kennedy Award for Most Outstanding New Talent	Sam Parsonson	Nominated	
Logie Awards	2008 (Note: Logie Awards for Season 3 (additional).)	Most Outstanding Actress in a Drama Series	Claudia Karvan	Nominated	
Logie Awards	2008	Most Outstanding Actress in a Drama Series	Asher Keddie	Nominated	
Logie Awards	2008	Graham Kennedy Award for Most Outstanding New Talent	Adelaide Clemens	Nominated	
Screen Music Awards	2005 (Note: Screen Music Award for Season 1.)	Best Music for a Television Series or Serial	Stephen Rae	Won	
Screen Producers Australia Awards	2005 (Note: Screen Producers Australia Award for Season 1.)	Drama Series Production of the Year	John Edwards	Won	

== Broadcast ==
The series premiered on FOX8 on 22 November 2004 during the late summer months when commercial TV is in a non-ratings period. During the second season it was moved to W. Channel. In 2007, for its third season, it screened on Showtime. Foxtel has been criticised for moving the show to different channels to encourage viewing of the W. Channel and then for moving the program to Showtime which is not included in the basic package of subscription television in Australia.

=== International airings ===
Love My Way was aired as a primetime show in the UK on Five's spin-off channel Five Life (Now 5Star), where it premiered on the channel's launch night of 15 October 2006. In Sweden it airs on channel 4 (TV4) on Thursday evenings and it also aired in Ireland on RTÉ Two in the early hours of Sunday, Monday and Wednesday. It is also screened in Estonia on ETV during Sunday evenings, and in New Zealand on TVNZ Channel 2 during late Monday evenings. As well, Super Channel carries Love My Way. In Mexico is screened on Cosmopolitan. The Netherlands as well.

== Home media ==
Title	Release date (Region 4)	No. of discs	ACB rating	Ref.
Love My Way – The First Series: Vols 1–5	2006	5	MA15+	
Love My Way: The Complete First Series	2 February 2006	5	MA15+	
Love My Way: Series 2	16 November 2006	3	MA15+	
Love My Way: Series 3	17 October 2007	3	MA15+	
Love My Way: The Complete Three Series – Everything	6 November 2008	11	MA15+	
Re-issue sets
Love My Way: The Complete First Series	2 July 2009	5	MA15+	
Love My Way: Series 2	6 January 2011	3	MA15+	
Love My Way: Series 3	5 May 2011	3	MA15+	
Love My Way: The Complete Series	21 April 2021	11	MA15+	
