= The Incredible Journey of Mary Bryant =

- Written by: Peter Berry
- Directed by: Peter Andrikidis
- Starring: Romola Garai; Jack Davenport; Alex O'Loughlin; Sam Neill; Tony Martin
- Country of origin: Australia
- Original language: English

Production
- Producers: Andrew Benson; Greg Haddrick
- Running time: 408 minutes
- Budget: A$15,000,000 (approx.)

Original release
- Release: 2005 – 2005

The Incredible Journey of Mary Bryant is a 2005 miniseries loosely based on the life of Mary Bryant, a teenage girl from Cornwall who in this telling was convicted of petty theft (though the historical Mary Bryant was transported for a violent robbery and assault), and who was transported to the Australian penal colony on the First Fleet with other prisoners bound for Botany Bay. It was written by Peter Berry and directed by Peter Andrikidis. The film had a budget in excess of A$15 million, making it the largest-budget television mini-series produced in Australia.

== Plot ==
Mary's story begins in her home, Cornwall Britain where her village is starving to death. In desperation, she steals, landing her a place on the long voyage to Sydney along with other convicts.

Made pregnant by a jailer, Mary is befriended by a quick-witted smuggler named Will. She is also aided by another on board, a stiff-necked, moralistic British officer named Lt Ralph Clarke, whose wife abandons him just as the ships set sail. His help is portrayed as a mission in humanity and social reform.

During a rough night at sea Mary hits her head on a bar and is knocked unconscious only to be saved by Will, with whom she becomes increasingly passionate. She is also cared for by Lt Clarke. Unaware that she is with child, Clarke asks permission from the Captain to let Mary stay with him. He believes that by educating her, he can reform her. Clarke has promised "the girl will remain an innocent under his charge" so, after finding out that she is pregnant, Clarke takes his anger out on one of the other female convicts (who insulted him) with a lash. Angered by his heartless act, Mary returns to the cells with the other prisoners.

After giving birth to her daughter on the ship, Mary and the other convicts arrive at Botany Bay. Mary names her daughter Charlotte, after the ship. Mary marries Will and has a son, Emmanuel. Her determination is always to avoid the hunger of her upbringing and to save her children from a similar fate.

Mary leaves her husband to live with Clarke who has been infatuated with her ever since the ship sailed. This is merely a distraction, so her husband and their friends can steal food and supplies. After getting everything they need to escape in the Governor's cutter, Mary slips away from Clarke in the middle of the night. Infuriated that Mary deceived him and again deserted him, Clarke shoots at and tries to sink their boat. They escape with only minor damage to the boat.

Mary, her husband Will, their two children, and five other men set sail for Timor, closely followed by Clarke who obsessively pursues them. Through sheer grit and enormous luck, most of them make it 4,000 miles to the Dutch colony of Timor where for a time they enjoy their freedom under false identities.

However, fate conspires against them as Clarke stops there on his way back to England. The group flee Clarke and his guards, splitting up to avoid being caught. Will, realising the danger that Mary and the children are in, intentionally leads the guards away from his frightened family. Pursued by the jealous Clarke, Will is eventually shot and killed.

An intense meeting between Mary and Clarke in the tropical jungle finds Clarke holding a pistol to Mary's head. Mary again tries to manipulate Clarke in order to save her children. Realising that she does not love him and only used him to survive, Clarke fires his pistol into the air, alerting nearby guards of their whereabouts, and Mary is arrested.

On the journey home to England both of her children die from shipboard diseases. An emotional Mary buries them at sea, as she says farewell to the last of her family.

On arrival in England, Mary gains the support of the English public as she tells her story of her search for justice, and the loss of her entire family. The court decide to free Mary and her companions in appreciation of their honesty and the belief that they have learnt their lesson. Clarke is left in England with the burden of being responsible for the death of Will, Charlotte and Emmanuel. Many people, including his superiors, believe that his actions were due to his obsession with Mary. As she stands once again in Cornwall, where her story began, she reflects on her family, freedom and the death of her loved ones. She silently agrees to carry on for their sake, despite not knowing what the future holds.

== Cast ==
Major characters

- Romola Garai as Mary Bryant
- Jack Davenport as Clarke
- Alex O'Loughlin as Will Bryant
- Sam Neill as Governor Arthur Phillip
- Tony Martin as Martin
- David Field as Thomas

Secondary cast

- Garry McDonald as Reverend Richard Johnson
- Dan Spielman as Cox
- Stephen Curry as Allen
- Abe Forsythe as Sam
- Alice McConnell as Elizabeth (ep. 1)
- Linal Haft as Sergeant Ryan
- Genevieve O’Reilly as Alicia (ep. 1)
- Brittany & Montana Carney as Charlotte
- Leo Wayne Jampijinpa as Bennelong (ep. 1)
- Edwina Bishop as Woman in Cornwall (ep. 1)
- Roxanne & Tieran Havard as Baby Charlotte (ep. 1)
- Jada, Jasmin & Tasha Lang as Baby Emmanuel
- Jacek Koman as Wanjon (ep. 2)
- Catherine McClements as Marleen (ep. 2)
- Michael Craig as Judge Stephens (ep. 2)

== Crew ==
Director	Peter Andrikidis
Writer	Peter Berry
Producers	Andrew Benson, Greg Haddrick
Executive Producers	Sue Masters, Peter Berry, Andy Harries, Des Monaghan, Justin Bodle
Director of Photography	Joe Pickering
Production Designer	Tim Ferrier
Costume Designer	Louise Wakefield
Editor	Henry Damgar
Composer	Iva Davies

== Awards and nominations ==
Award	Category	Recipient	Result	Ref
AFI Awards	Best Television Mini Series or Telefeature		Won	
AFI Awards	Best Direction in Television	Peter Andrikidis	Nominated	
AFI Awards	Best Screenplay in Television	Peter Berry	Nominated	
AFI Awards	Best Lead Actor in Television	Alex O'Loughlin	Nominated	
AFI Awards	Best Lead Actress in Television	Romola Garai	Nominated	
AFI Awards	Best Guest or Supporting Actress in Television	Alice McConnell	Nominated	
AFI Awards	Best Production Design	Tim Ferrier	Nominated	
Chicago International Film Festival	Gold Plaque for Best Mini-Series		Won	
Chicago International Film Festival	Best Achievement in Direction	Peter Andrikidis	Won	
Logie Awards	Most Outstanding Actor in a Series	Alex O'Loughlin	Nominated	
Logie Awards	Most Outstanding Actress in a Series	Romola Garai	Nominated	
Logie Awards	Most Outstanding Mini Series or Telemovie		Won	
