= 2004 in Australian television =

== Events ==
- 1 January – Australia's first Digital commercial free-to-air channel, Tasmanian Digital Television begins broadcasting in Hobart as a supplementary broadcaster to existing broadcasters Southern Cross Tasmania & WIN Television. On the same day, WIN TEN goes on air in the Mount Gambier & Riverland regions of South Australia as a supplementary broadcaster to existing solus broadcaster WIN Television.
- February – Nine launches a new afternoon news service to complete against Seven's 4:30 pm news, which was launched the previous year to provide viewers with up-to-date information on the War on Iraq.
- 1 February – Deal or No Deal debuts its 5.30pm timeslot on Seven which would last until 2015. This proves to be a massive ratings hit, leading into Seven's 6pm news bulletin. Its success proves too much for the Nine Network, with reworked game shows including The Price is Right, Bert's Family Feud and Million Dollar Wheel of Fortune all failing in the 5:30pm timeslot until Hot Seat's arrival in 2009.
- 2 February – Wheel of Fortune makes a rebranding and a new-look over to continue its long-run. Also, Steve Oemcke takes over from Rob Elliott as the show's final original main host.
- 14 March – Foxtel launches its new digital service, Foxtel Digital.
- 23 March – American animated science fiction sitcom Futurama created by Matt Groening the creator of The Simpsons airs on the Seven Network for one last time. The show would move to Network Ten on 30 November the following year.
- 5 April – Neighbours returns to air on American television with Oxygen broadcasting the series.
- 12 April – The Australian television series New MacDonald's Farm premieres on the Nine Network
- 18 April - Rove McManus wins the 2004 TV WEEK Gold Logie.
- 21 April - A live episode of Blue Heelers goes to air on the Seven Network, titled "Reasonable Doubt". Although this particular episode earned reasonable ratings, peaking with 693,000 viewers in Melbourne, the rest of the season is a failure ratings-wise.
- 1 May – Network Ten breaks with years of tradition and abandons the Sunday night movie after poor ratings. Instead, it screens some episodes of Law and Order: Criminal Intent. Most other networks follow suit later on.
- 12 May – After 18 years at SBS, Margaret Pomeranz and David Stratton resign from the station to move to the ABC to present a new program, At the Movies. Four younger presenters replace them on The Movie Show: Megan Spencer, Fenella Kernebone and Jaimie Leonarder, with Marc Fennell presenting a segment on newly released DVDs.
- 17 June, 5:58pm – Dean Cartechini becomes the first person to win Deal or No Deal's top prize, winning $200,000.
- 28 June – The Price is Right moves to the 5:00 pm timeslot on the Nine Network. The show extends to one hour.
- 26 July – Broken Hill resident Trevor Butler proposes to his girlfriend immediately after winning A$1,000,000 on Big Brother.
- 13 August – After a short-lived return at its new 11:30 am timeslot, Ten axes vintage Neighbours episodes again after bad ratings.
- 16 August – Ten extends its morning news into a one-hour format.
- 29 August – The Nine Network launches a new look version of the colour-coded days ident will be shown, again placing focus on the slogan “Still the One”.
- 30 August – Immediately after the closing ceremony of the Athens Olympics, the first ever Sunrise is broadcast from the Seven Network's new Martin Place studios. On the same night, Seven News relaunches nationwide with a complete overhaul of graphics, a new musical theme (unchanged until 1 February 2016) and a new set in Sydney. Nine News counters by introducing live CBD backdrops on its Sydney and Brisbane bulletins.
- 7 September – The American drama series Cold Case premieres on the Nine Network.
- 12 September – The 2001 war film Behind Enemy Lines starring Owen Wilson and Gene Hackman premieres on the Seven Network.
- 4 October – British long running children's animated series Peppa Pig debuts on ABC.
- 5 October – After a five-year absence, Daryl Somers returns to television to host a brand new series on Seven Network called Dancing with the Stars based on the American light entertainment reality series of the same name.
- 13 October – The Australian version of Border Security premieres on the Seven Network and is shown every Wednesday at 9:30 pm.
- 21 November – 16-year-old Casey Donovan wins the second series of Australian Idol defeating 21-year-old favourite, Anthony Callea. Her debut single "Listen with Your Heart" reaches number one in the ARIA Charts in December 2004.
- 23 November – Home and Away actress Bec Cartwright and her partner Michael Miziner are crowned season champions as the first season of Dancing with the Stars reaches its grand final.
- 11 December – The Network Ten is the next Australian television network to introduce a watermark on its programs, although the watermark is now broadcast on Ten News. It was located on the bottom left of the screens before switching to bottom right in 2006.
- 14 December – The final episode of Stingers goes to air on the Nine Network after a 6-year run.
- December – Seven, Nine & TEN withdrawn their opening to movies - movie openers are replaced by classification boards instead.
- Wheel of Fortune's attempt for a major revamp backfires and is quietly cancelled due to low ratings - leaving Deal or No Deal the absolute only game show remaining, leading into Seven's 6pm news bulletin.
- December – The Nine Network claims the ratings season for the fourth consecutive year, winning 38 out of 40 weeks, while Network Ten (which wins the other two weeks) finishes ahead of the Seven Network nationally for the first time.

== Debuts ==
Program	Channel	Debut date
Fergus McPhail	Network Ten	2 January
Surfing the Menu	ABC	14 January
My Restaurant Rules	Seven Network	1 February
Deal Or No Deal	Seven Network	1 February
ttn	Network Ten	3 February
Fireflies	ABC	7 February
The Einstein Factor	ABC	8 February
Strictly Dancing	ABC	11 February
The Resort	Network Ten	February
The Hot House	Network Ten	February
The New Inventors	ABC	10 March
New MacDonald's Farm	Nine Network	12 April
Coxy's Big Break	Seven Network	17 April
At the Movies	ABC	1 July
Wicked Science	Network Ten	2 July
Parallax	Nine Network	5 August
John Safran vs God	SBS	30 August
Dancing with the Stars	Seven Network	5 October
The Cooks	Network Ten	18 October
Foreign Exchange	Nine Network	5 November

=== Pay TV ===
Program	Channel	Debut date
Cooking for Kids with Luis	Nick Jr.	25 October
Love My Way	FOX8	22 November

== New international programming ==
Program	Channel	Debut date
(United States) Stanley	Seven Network	3 January
(Japan) Hamtaro	Network Ten	26 January
(United States) / (Mexico) / (Canada) ¡Mucha Lucha!	Nine Network	8 February
(United Kingdom) Death in Holy Orders	ABC	8 February
(United States) Harvey Birdman, Attorney at Law	SBS	20 February
(New Zealand) Freaky	ABC	23 February
(United Kingdom) The Way Things Work	ABC	23 February
(United States) The Fairly OddParents	ABC	1 March
(United Kingdom) Boohbah	ABC	1 March
(United States) Fillmore!	Seven Network	6 March
(United Kingdom) The Basil Brush Show	ABC	9 March
(Japan) Dragon Ball GT	Network Ten	15 March
(Canada) Max & Ruby	ABC	22 March
(United Kingdom) / (United States) / (Republic of Ireland) Jakers! The Adventures of Piggley Winks	ABC	29 March
(United Kingdom) Wide-Eye	ABC	29 March
(United States) Two and a Half Men	Nine Network	29 March
(United States) Lilo & Stitch: The Series	Seven Network	3 April
(United Kingdom) Boo!	ABC	5 April
(Japan) Astro Boy (2003)	ABC	15 April
(Canada) / (United States) / (United Kingdom) Franny's Feet	ABC	3 May
(United Kingdom) Metalheads	ABC	5 May
(United States) He-Man and the Masters of the Universe (2002)	Network Ten	8 May
(United States) NCIS	Network Ten	9 May
(France) Pigeon Boy	ABC	10 May
(United States) Grim and Evil	Nine Network	16 May
(United States) The Proud Family	Seven Network	5 June
(France) / (Canada) Potatoes and Dragons	ABC	7 June
(United States) Play With Me Sesame	ABC	5 July
(Japan) Zoids: Fuzors	Network Ten	17 July
(United Kingdom) New Tricks	ABC	23 July
(Japan) Transformers: Energon	Network Ten	14 August
(United Kingdom) Bob the Builder: The Knights of Can-a-Lot	ABC	16 August
(United States) Tutenstein	ABC	6 September
(United States) Cold Case	Nine Network	7 September
(United States) / (Japan) Sonic X	Network Ten	13 September
(Japan) Duel Masters	Network Ten	17 September
(United Kingdom) Hustle	ABC	19 September
(United Kingdom) Peppa Pig	ABC	4 October
(Canada) Atomic Betty	ABC	14 October
(United Kingdom) Postman Pat (2002)	ABC	20 October
(United Kingdom) Little Britain	ABC	21 October
(United States) Kenny the Shark	ABC	22 October
(United States) Time Squad	Nine Network	2 November
(United Kingdom) Himalaya with Michael Palin	ABC	13 November
(United States) Firefly	Seven Network	24 November
(United Kingdom) Powers	ABC	26 November
(United Kingdom) Creature Comforts	ABC	2 December
(United Kingdom) French Leave	ABC	3 December
(United Kingdom) Rose and Maloney	ABC	14 December
(Japan) Beyblade G-Revolution	Network Ten	15 December
(Republic of Ireland) Any Time Now	ABC	30 December
(Australia) / (Canada) The Eggs	Nine Network	2004
(United Kingdom) Road Wars	Seven Network	2004
(United States) Scare Tactics	Nine Network	2004
(United States) The Handler	Network Ten	2004
(United States) Threat Matrix	Seven Network	2004
(United Kingdom) There's Something About Miriam	Network Ten	2004
(United States) Tru Calling	Seven Network	2004
(United States) Jay Jay the Jet Plane	Nine Network	2004
(United States) Survivor: Vanuatu	Nine Network	2004

=== Subscription television ===
Program	Channel	Debut date
(United States) All Grown Up!	Nickelodeon	February
(United States) ChalkZone	Nickelodeon	Q2
(United States) Stuart Little: The Animated Series	Nickelodeon	Q2
(United States) Duck Dodgers	Cartoon Network	10 April
(United Kingdom) The Cassidys	UKTV	26 April
(Canada) My Dad the Rock Star	Nickelodeon	27 April
(United States) Romeo!	Nickelodeon	31 May
(United States) Pimp My Ride	MTV Australia	2 July
(United States) Drake & Josh	Nickelodeon	August
(Canada) / (France) Martin Mystery	Nickelodeon	August
(United States) The Ashlee Simpson Show	MTV Australia	5 August
(United States) Dr. 90210	E!	12 September
(United States) Phil of the Future	Disney Channel	20 September
(United States) Foster's Home for Imaginary Friends	Cartoon Network	24 September
(United States) The Assistant	MTV Australia	October
(United States) Maybe It's Me	Nickelodeon	14 October
(United States) Laguna Beach: The Real Orange County	MTV Australia	2 December

== Specials ==
Program	Channel	Debut date
(United States) Winnie the Pooh: Springtime with Roo	Seven Network	11 April
(Australia) / (United States) 2004 Kids' Choice Awards	Nickelodeon	25 September

== Programming changes ==
=== Changes to network affiliation ===
This is a list of programs which made their premiere on an Australian television network that had previously premiered on another Australian television network. The networks involved in the switch of allegiances are predominantly both free-to-air networks or both subscription television networks. Programs that have their free-to-air/subscription television premiere, after previously premiering on the opposite platform (free-to air to subscription/subscription to free-to air) are not included. In some cases, programs may still air on the original television network. This occurs predominantly with programs shared between subscription television networks.

=== International ===
Program	New network	Previous network	Date
(United States) The O.C.	Network Ten	Nine Network	22 June
(United States) Garfield and Friends	FOX8	Nickelodeon	2004
(Japan) Sailor Moon	FOX8	Fox Kids	2004
(United States) The Flintstones	Boomerang	Cartoon Network	2004
(United States) Fat Albert and the Cosby Kids	Boomerang	Cartoon Network	2004

=== Subscription premieres ===
This is a list of programs which made their premiere on Australian subscription television that had previously premiered on Australian free-to-air television. Programs may still air on the original free-to-air television network.

==== International ====
Program	Subscription network	Free-to-air network	Date
(United Kingdom) Operation Good Guys	UKTV	SBS TV	26 April

== Television shows ==
ABC

- Four Corners (1961–present)
- The Fat (2000–2003)
- Kath & Kim (2002–2005, 2007)
- The Glass House (2001–2006)

Seven Network

- Wheel of Fortune (1981–1996, 1996–2003, 2004–present)
- Sunrise (1991–1998, 2003–present)
- Home and Away (1988–2005, 2005–present)
- Blue Heelers (1994–2006)
- Today Tonight (1995–present)
- All Saints (1998–present)
- Ground Force (1999–2004)
- AMV (2000–present)
- The Big Arvo (2001–2004)
- Deal or No Deal (2003, 2004–present)

Nine Network

- Sale of the Century (1980–2001)
- A Current Affair (1971–1978, 1988–2005, 2006–present)
- Today (1982–present)
- Australia's Funniest Home Video Show (1990–2000, 2000–2004, 2005–present)
- The AFL Footy Show (1994–present)
- The NRL Footy Show (1994–present)
- Burgo's Catch Phrase (1997–2003)
- Who Wants to Be a Millionaire? (1999–2006, 2007–present)
- Backyard Blitz (2000–2007)
- McLeod's Daughters (2001–present)
- Merrick & Rosso Unplanned (2003–2004)
- The Block (2003–2004)

Network Ten

- Neighbours (1985–1989, 1989–present)
- Good Morning Australia (1991–2005)
- Rove Live (2000–2006)
- Australian Idol (2003–present)

== Ending / resting this year ==
Date	Show	Channel	Debut
(2004 – the whole year)	Behind The News	ABC	1969
5 February	Burgo's Catch Phrase	Nine Network	1997
28 July	Skithouse	Network Ten	2003
24 November	The Panel	Network Ten	1998
26 November	Burke's Backyard	Nine Network	1987
14 December	Stingers	Nine Network	1998

== Revamping this year ==
Date	Show	Channel
February	Wheel of Fortune	Seven Network

== See also ==
- 2004 in Australia
- List of Australian films of 2004
