= Greg Haddrick =

Australian writer and television producer

- Born: Gregory Bevan Haddrick; 7 September 1960 (age 66); Sydney, New South Wales, Australia
- Education: Newington College; University of Sydney
- Occupations: Screenwriter; film producer; television producer
- Spouse: Margaret
- Children: 3
- Parent(s): Lorraine and Ron Haddrick AM MBE

Gregory Bevan Haddrick (7 September 1960) is an Australian-born screenwriter and film and television producer. Over the last decade he has won six AWGIE Awards as a writer, two AFI Awards as a producer, and an International Emmy Award nomination as a writer and producer. In addition, in 2006 he won a Logie Award for a mini-series. In 2012, The Australian reported that: "If you've watched an Australian television drama in the past year, there's a one in two chance it was written by Greg Haddrick."

== Early life ==
Haddrick is the younger child and only son of actor Ron Haddrick AM MBE and his wife. He was educated at Homebush Public School, where he was School Captain in 1972, and at Newington College (1973–78), where he was Senior Prefect in 1978. In 1982 he graduated with as a Bachelor of Arts (Honours, English) from the University of Sydney.

== Film and television career ==
- Writer & Script Editor – Sons and Daughters
- First Writer – Home and Away
- Co-writer & Script Editor – Elly & Jools
- Co-writer of screenplay – The Magic Pudding feature film
- Writer – My Husband, My Killer
- Script editor of screenplay – The Potato Factory mini-series
- Script editor – Ihaka: Blunt Instrument telemovie
- Creator – MDA on ABC TV
- Producer – The Incredible Journey of Mary Bryant
- Co-writer – The Society Murders telemovie
- Co-producer & Writer – Underbelly
- Co-writer – Mirror, Mirror
- Producer – Cloudstreet
- Producer – Crownies
- Writer & Executive Producer – Janet King
- Writer – Bikie Wars: Brothers in Arms
- Writer – Tricky Business
- Creator & writer – Pine Gap (TV series)

== Awards ==
Association	Year	Award	Work	Results
AWGIE Awards		2 winner for scriptwriting	Home and Away	Won
International Emmy Awards	2003	Best Drama Series	MDA	Nominated
Australian Film Institute Awards	2003	Best Drama Series	MDA	Won
Australian Film Institute Awards	2005	Best Mini-Series	The Incredible Journey of Mary Bryant	Won
Logie Awards	2006	Most Outstanding Mini-Series	The Incredible Journey of Mary Bryant	Won
AWGIE AWARDS	2006	Television Series Script	MDA	Won
AWGIE AWARDS	2006	Television Adaptation	The Society Murders	Won
AWGIE AWARDS	2008	Telemovie Original	The Informant	Won
AWGIE AWARDS	2008	Television Mini-Series Adaptation	Underbelly	Won
AWGIE AWARDS	2008	(MAJOR) Peer recognition Praise	Underbelly	Honoured

== Publications ==
- Top Shelf 1: Reading and Writing the Best in Australian TV Drama ISBN 0-86819-610-X (Sydney, 2001)
- Top Shelf 2: Five Outstanding Television Screenplays ISBN 0-86819-611-8 (Sydney, 2001)
- The Mushroom Murders ISBN 9781761473661 (Allen & Unwin, 2025)
