= The Proposition (2005 film) =

2005 Australian Western

- Theatrical release poster
- Directed by: John Hillcoat
- Screenplay by: Nick Cave
- Produced by: Chris Brown; Jackie O'Sullivan; Chiara Menage; Cat Villiers
- Starring: Guy Pearce; Ray Winstone; Danny Huston; John Hurt; David Wenham; Emily Watson
- Cinematography: Benoît Delhomme
- Edited by: Jon Gregory
- Music by: Nick Cave; Warren Ellis
- Production companies: UK Film Council; Surefire Films; Autonomous; Jackie O Productions; Pictures in Paradise; The Pacific Film and Television Commission; The Film Consortium
- Distributed by: Sony Pictures Releasing and TV1 General Entertainment Partnership (Australia); Tartan Films (UK)
- Release dates: 12 September 2005 (Toronto); 6 October 2005 (Australia); 10 March 2006 (UK)
- Running time: 104 minutes
- Countries: Australia; United Kingdom
- Language: English
- Budget: $2 million
- Box office: $5 million

The Proposition is a 2005 Australian Western film directed by John Hillcoat and written by screenwriter and musician Nick Cave. It stars Guy Pearce, Ray Winstone, Emily Watson, John Hurt, Danny Huston and David Wenham. The film's production completed in 2004 and was followed by a wide 2005 release in Australia and a 2006 cinematic run in the U.S. through First Look Pictures. The film was shot on location in Winton, Queensland.

== Plot ==
In 1880s Australia, Charlie Burns and his gang of bushrangers engage in a gunfight with the police. All gang members except Charlie and his younger brother Mikey are killed. Captain Morris Stanley tells Charlie that he will have Mikey executed by Christmas, which is in 9 days. Stanley offers to free both Mikey and Charlie if Charlie agrees to kill his older brother Arthur Burns, who is wanted for the rape and murder of pregnant Eliza Hopkins and her family. Mikey remains in custody while Charlie sets out to kill their brother. During a raid, the police capture some Aboriginal Australians who call Arthur a "dog man" and report that no one goes near his cave. In town, Stanley's wife Martha asks him for details about Eliza's death. He hides both the grisly nature of her death and the deal he made with the two other Burns brothers from her. Sergeant Lawrence does not approve of his decision to let Charlie go free, informing the other policemen of Stanley's deal and speaking of their attraction to Martha in secret.

Riding in search of Arthur, Charlie encounters an inebriated old man named Jellon Lamb in a cantina where the owner has been speared to death. Charlie realizes Lamb is a bounty hunter pursuing the Burns brothers and knocks him out. Later, Charlie awakes and is speared in the chest by a group of Aboriginal men. Before passing out, he sees the man who speared him get shot in the head.

In town, word has spread of Stanley's proposition and Martha begins to notice people treating her differently, raising her suspicions. Eden Fletcher, who hired Stanley to "clean up" the area, comes into town and orders that Mikey be given one hundred lashes as punishment for the rape and murder of the Hopkins family. Stanley is aghast at this, as he believes Mikey is not responsible for his actions and the flogging will kill him, and because it will break his deal with Charlie and bring the Burns gang's revenge upon him and his wife. Martha, listening in on their conversation, learns the truth of her friend's rape and murder. Stanley realises Lawrence's disloyalty and sends him and a group of his men away to hunt the Aboriginals responsible for the death of the cantina owner.

Charlie wakes up in his brother Arthur's camp, located in caves among desolate mountains. Arthur's gang consists of Samuel Stoat, a woman named Queenie who tends to Charlie's wound, and an Aboriginal man called Two-Bob. As he recovers, Charlie has several opportunities to kill his brother but does not. He lies to Arthur that Mikey is not with him because he has met a woman.

On the day of Mikey's flogging, Captain Stanley attempts to defend him at gunpoint from the bloodthirsty townspeople but is overruled once Martha arrives and insists on revenge for her dead friend. Mikey is flogged and gravely wounded. The townspeople grow tired at the excessive display, Martha faints, and Stanley flings the bloody whip at Fletcher, who fires him. Back at the abandoned cantina, Sergeant Lawrence and his men have found and massacred a group of Aboriginal people. Arthur and Two-Bob find Lawrence's group while they sleep and kill Jacko and Sergeant Lawrence. Before Arthur stomps Lawrence to death, Lawrence tells Arthur that Charlie has been sent to kill him.

Lamb enters Arthur's camp and ties up Samuel and Charlie, both of whom are sleeping. Lamb is shot in the stomach by the returning Two-Bob. Arthur stabs Lamb in the heart; Charlie points his revolver at Arthur, but instead shoots Lamb in the head, putting him out of his misery. He finally informs Arthur that Mikey is in custody and is set to hang. Charlie decides to break out Mikey; Arthur, Samuel and Charlie ride into town dressed in police uniforms, while Two-Bob poses as an Aboriginal man they have captured. Once at the jail, the men free Mikey, and Charlie and Two-Bob ride off with him, but the injured Mikey dies in Charlie's arms. Arthur and Samuel remain to behead the two officers in the jail.

Stanley fears retribution and makes preparations, but he and Martha let their guard down to have a peaceful Christmas dinner. Shortly after the Stanleys say grace, Arthur and Samuel shoot open the door and invade their home. Arthur pulls Stanley into another room and brutally beats him. Samuel drags Martha inside, and Arthur has Stanley watch as Samuel begins to rape her. Charlie walks in and informs Arthur of Mikey's death; Arthur ignores him and encourages Charlie to listen to Samuel's beautiful singing. Charlie shoots Samuel in the head, then shoots Arthur twice, disgusted by his conduct. Arthur staggers out of the house and Charlie follows to find him seated on the ground. Arthur asks Charlie what his next move is, and dies.

== Cast ==
- Guy Pearce as Charlie Burns
- Ray Winstone as Captain Morris Stanley
- Emily Watson as Martha Stanley
- Danny Huston as Arthur Burns
- David Wenham as Eden Fletcher
- Richard Wilson as Mike Burns
- John Hurt as Jellon Lamb
- Tom E. Lewis as Two Bob
- Leah Purcell as Queenie
- Tom Budge as Samuel Stoat
- Robert Morgan as Sergeant Lawrence
- David Gulpilil as Jacko
- Noah Taylor as Brian O'Leary
- Oliver Ackland as Patrick Hopkins
- Mick Roughan as Mad Jack Bradshaw
- Shane Watt as John Gordon
- Rodney Boschman as Tobey
- Ralph Cotterill as Dr. Bantrey
- Bryan Probets as Officer Dunn
- Bogdan Koca as Paul Broussard
- Gary Waddell as Officer Davenport

== Soundtrack ==
The film's soundtrack, titled The Proposition, was released shortly after the film in October 2005. The music was composed and performed by Nick Cave and violinist Warren Ellis. When asked if he himself would be appearing in the film, Cave joked he was "too handsome".

== Reception ==
=== Box office ===
The Proposition received a limited release in North America opening in three theatres and grossed $32,681, with an average of $10,893 per theatre and ranking #46 at the box office. The widest release in the United States for the film was 200 theatres and it ended up earning $1,903,434. The film also grossed $3,145,259 internationally including $1,567,266 in Australia and $1,157,037 in the United Kingdom for a total of $5,048,693.

=== Critical response ===
The Proposition received positive reviews from film critics and has a score of 86% on Rotten Tomatoes based on 130 reviews, with an average rating of 7.30/10. The critical consensus states: "Brutal, unflinching, and violent, but thought-provoking and with excellent performances, this Australian western is one of the best examples of the genre to come along in recent times." The film also has a score of 73 out of 100 on Metacritic based on 31 critics.

At the Movies critic Margaret Pomeranz called it an "extraordinary film [that] explores the elliptical nature of class, race, colonisation and family. … All the performances are strong but once again Guy Pearce brings a strange power to Charlie and Ray Winstone is truly fine as Stanley. And Danny Huston is oddly perfect as Arthur. It's a strange, unsettling film, ultimately quite moving, it's impossible not to respond to it strongly. It's not an easy access film. It's violent and the motivation of the characters is sometimes oblique."

Co-host David Stratton thought that The Proposition was "a fascinating depiction of the outback in this period, and I've never seen an Australian film which told what is basically a bushranging story in such an unusual way. So, it has a lot of originality there. And it has fine performances. I thought Danny Huston was extraordinary, actually. He's an actor I usually don't respond to, but I thought he was excellent in this role. So, there's a lot of intriguing elements to this film, but I did find the violence almost unwatchable."

Roger Ebert, giving it four out of four, described the film as "a movie you cannot turn away from; it is so pitiless and uncompromising, so filled with pathos and disregarded innocence, that it is a record of those things we pray to be delivered from". AM New York, The Austin Chronicle and Entertainment Insider also gave the film four out of four.

Ty Burr of The Boston Globe acclaimed the film as "a near-masterpiece of mood and menace, and one that deserves to be seen on the largest screen possible".

J. R. Jones of the Chicago Reader said: "This Aussie feature perfectly re-creates the charbroiled landscapes and cruel psychodrama of the old Sergio Leone westerns, with John Hurt particularly fine as a raging old mountain goat." Lisa Schwarzbaum of Entertainment Weekly opined the film as "a pitiless yet elegiac Australian Western as caked with beauty as it is with blood".

Joe Morgenstern of The Wall Street Journal labelled the film "a visionary tale of a fragile civilizing impulse crushed by family loyalty and a lust for revenge in the vast outback of the late 19th century".

Chris Barsanti of the Film Journal International called it "the finest, strangest and most uncompromising western to hit screens since Unforgiven".

=== Awards ===
Award	Category	Subject	Result
AACTA Awards (2005 AFI Awards)	Best Film	Chris Brown, Chiara Menage, Jackie O'Sullivan and Cat Villiers	Nominated
AACTA Awards (2005 AFI Awards)	Best Direction	John Hillcoat	Nominated
AACTA Awards (2005 AFI Awards)	Best Original Screenplay	Nick Cave	Nominated
AACTA Awards (2005 AFI Awards)	Best Actor	Guy Pearce	Nominated
AACTA Awards (2005 AFI Awards)	Best Actor	Ray Winstone	Nominated
AACTA Awards (2005 AFI Awards)	Best Supporting Actor	John Hurt	Nominated
AACTA Awards (2005 AFI Awards)	Best Cinematography	Benoît Delhomme	Won
AACTA Awards (2005 AFI Awards)	Best Editing	Jon Gregory	Nominated
AACTA Awards (2005 AFI Awards)	Best Original Music Score	Nick Cave and Warren Ellis	Won
AACTA Awards (2005 AFI Awards)	Best Sound	Richard Davey, Paul Davies, Ian Morgan and Craig Walmsley	Nominated
AACTA Awards (2005 AFI Awards)	Best Production Design	Chris Kennedy	Won
AACTA Awards (2005 AFI Awards)	Best Costume Design	Margot Wilson	Won
FCCA Awards	Best Film	Chris Brown, Chiara Menage, Jackie O'Sullivan and Cat Villiers	Nominated
FCCA Awards	Best Director	John Hillcoat	Nominated
FCCA Awards	Best Original Screenplay	Nick Cave	Nominated
FCCA Awards	Best Actor	Guy Pearce	Nominated
FCCA Awards	Best Cinematography	Benoît Delhomme	Won
FCCA Awards	Best Musical Score	Nick Cave and Warren Ellis	Won
Golden Trailer Award	Best Foreign Dramatic Trailer		Nominated
Inside Film Awards	Best Feature Film	Chris Brown, Chiara Menage, Jackie O'Sullivan and Cat Villiers	Won
Inside Film Awards	Best Direction	John Hillcoat	Nominated
Inside Film Awards	Best Script	Nick Cave	Nominated
Inside Film Awards	Best Actor	Guy Pearce	Nominated
Inside Film Awards	Best Actress	Emily Watson	Nominated
Inside Film Awards	Best Cinematography	Benoît Delhomme	Won
Inside Film Awards	Best Editing	Jon Gregory	Nominated
Inside Film Awards	Best Music	Nick Cave and Warren Ellis	Won
Inside Film Awards	Best Production Design	Chris Kennedy	Won
International Cinephile Society Award	Best Picture	Chris Brown, Chiara Menage, Jackie O'Sullivan and Cat Villiers	Nominated
London Film Critics' Circle Award	British Supporting Actress of the Year	Emily Watson	Nominated
Golden Reel Award	Best Sound Editing for Music in a Feature Film	Gerard McCann	Nominated
San Diego Film Critics Society Award	Best Supporting Actor	Ray Winstone	Won
Toronto Film Critics Association Award	Best Supporting Performance, Male	Danny Huston	Nominated
Venice Film Festival	Gucci Prize for Best Screenplay	Nick Cave	Won
World Soundtrack Academy	Discovery of the Year	Nick Cave and Warren Ellis	Nominated

== Aboriginal culture ==
Three acclaimed Aboriginal Australian actors (David Gulpilil, Tom E. Lewis and Leah Purcell) have supporting roles in the film.

As noted in behind-the-scenes features included on The Proposition DVD, the film is regarded as uncommonly accurate in depicting Aboriginal Australian culture of the late 19th century, and when filming in the outback, the cast and crew took great pains to follow the advice of indigenous consultants. In an interview included on the DVD, Lewis even compares the depiction of Aboriginal or Torres Strait Islander cultures in The Proposition to the landmark film The Chant of Jimmie Blacksmith (1978), in which Lewis starred.

== Home media ==
The DVD was released in the United States by First Look Pictures on 19 September 2006.

Tartan Video's Region 2 DVD release in the UK was a two-disc release and contains these additional features: audio commentary by Nick Cave and John Hillcoat on disc 1, exclusive interviews with Guy Pearce and Danny Huston (25 minutes), a "meet the cast and crew" feature (35 minutes), a "making of" feature (118 minutes) and a theatrical trailer on disc 2.

The film was released on Blu-ray on 19 August 2008 and Ultra HD Blu-Ray on April 11, 2022.

== See also ==
- List of Australian films
- Cinema of Australia
