= 2001 in Australian television =

== Events ==
- 1 January – Digital Television arrives in the major state capitals of Australia and states in it, with the ABC and SBS permitted to operate multi-channel services.
- 24 January – The Seven Network loses the TV rights to the AFL for the first time, since televised football began in 1957. The rights are won by a Nine Network-Network Ten-Fox Footy Channel consortium.
- 5 February – The Weakest Link premieres on the Seven Network, airing twice a week, Mondays and Fridays, however, shortly before the commencement of the AFL season, the latter edition is moved forwards to Thursdays in Melbourne, Adelaide and Perth, and then in Sydney and Brisbane after the conclusion of the AFL season.
- 11 February – The Network Ten undergoes a major revamp in its production and circle logo and on air graphics as a part of a new network re-launch, with the launch of its motto Seriously Ten, which are both currently in use to the 2012 revamp.
- 22 February – The voice actors behind the Funimation dubbed version of Dragon Ball Z Sean Schemmel (Goku, Nails and King Kai) and Christopher Sabat (Piccolo, Vegeta and Yamcha) appear on Cheez TV for an interview on Network Ten.
- 26 March – The $10,000 bank target is achieved for the first time on an episode of The Weakest Link.
- 10 April – American mystery fiction television series CSI: Crime Scene Investigation premieres on the Nine Network and is shown every Tuesday at 8:30 pm.
- 22 April – The Australian version of Big Brother premieres on Network Ten.
- 25 April – Brooke Marshall wins the second season of The Mole, taking home $100,000 in prize money. Michael Laffy is revealed as the Mole, and Hal Pritchard is the runner-up.
- 7 May – Nine players who were voted off The Weakest Link early in previous episodes were given a second chance to win up to $100,000.
- 27 May – Nine previous winners of The Weakest Link appear on the show again for another chance to win up to $100,000. In this episode, the $10,000 bank target is achieved again.
- 2 June – Mamma Mia: The Ultimate ABBA-Thon a 75-minute live variety special with a tribute to ABBA, goes to air live on the Nine Network. The special followed by a showing of ABBA: The Movie, a 1977 documentary on the group’s visit to Australia.
- 22 June – Hi-5 airs its 100th episode.
- 24 June – Australian children's Sunday morning wrapper programme Couch Potato airs its final episode on ABC hosted by Abby Coleman and David Heinrich and finishing up with a rerun of SimsalaGrimm.
- 16 July –
  - Network Ten's Melbourne-based drama series The Secret Life of Us makes its first screening debut.
  - The first season of Big Brother was won by Ben Williams.
  - Australian soap opera Home and Away has switched over to air on Channel 5 in the UK after ITV lost the rights to the series.
- 31 July – Australian miniseries Blue Murder finally screens in NSW and the ACT for the very first time on the ABC six years after its broadcast in other states and territories due to the life sentence of Neddy Smith.
- 1 August – The ABC launches its very first digital multi-channel service ABC Kids. The channel airs programmes aimed at children and runs from 6:00am to 6:00pm.
- 7 August – The final episode of Water Rats goes to air on the Nine Network and the show was axed after six years.
- 8 August –
  - Australian rural drama series McLeod's Daughters, based on the 1996 telemovie of the same name, premieres on Nine Network, which broadcasts every Wednesday at 7:30 pm.
  - Long running Australian soap opera Neighbours begins airing on television stations in Ireland for the very first time on RTÉ.
- 11 September – Television networks relay coverage from CNN, NBC, ABC America and the BBC for up to forty-eight hours in the wake of September 11 attacks. Ten News is the first Australian network to cover the events, on its late news bulletin with Sandra Sully.
- 29 September – The Seven Network televises its final game of AFL until March 2007.
- 1 November – The ABC launches another digital multi-channel service called Fly TV. Airing from 6:00pm to 6:00am, the channel broadcasts music videos, reviews, comedy, drama, news programming, sport programmes, cartoons and current affairs for teenagers and young adults.
- 22 November – After Prime Television axes Regional television news bulletins in Newcastle, Wollongong and Canberra, and Southern Cross Broadcasting axes regional bulletins in Canberra and North Queensland, the ABA holds an inquiry into the adequacy of regional news services. Bulletins eventually return to those areas in 2004, albeit in the form of two-minute updates during weekdays in the ratings season.
- 25 November – The 1999 Film Notting Hill starring Hugh Grant and Julia Roberts premieres on the Seven Network.
- 29 November – After 21 years, Sale of the Century is "rested". It later returns to the Nine Network as Temptation in 2005 and runs until 2007, and again 2008 until 2009. Also another Nine Network game show Burgo's Catch Phrase has given the axe after 4 years.
- 12 December – The American comedy-drama series Gilmore Girls premieres on the Nine Network.
- December – The Nine Network will introduce a watermark on its programs. Until now, the Channel Nine watermark will now be broadcast on all news (until 2008 for the major revamp of its news bulletins, but reinstated in late 2009), current affairs and Live programs.
- December – A record $72,900 is won on The Weakest Link's special titled The Best of the Best.

== Debuts ==
=== Free-to-air ===
==== Domestic ====
Program	Channel	Debut date
Love Is a Four Letter Word	ABC	30 January
The Big Arvo	Seven Network	1 February
The Weakest Link	Seven Network	5 February
Greed	Network Ten	11 February
Sit Down, Shut Up	Network Ten	16 February
Flat Chat	Nine Network	19 February
Cash Bonanza	Nine Network	3 March
Head Start	ABC	4 March
Littlemore	ABC	5 March
Big Brother	Network Ten	22 April
The Saddle Club	ABC TV	30 April
Horace and Tina	Network Ten	4 May
Wild Kat	Network Ten	2 June
Outriders	Nine Network	9 July
Insiders	ABC	15 July
Cybergirl	Network Ten	21 July
Big Brother: Adults Only	Network Ten	23 July
All Aussie Adventures	Network Ten	5 August
McLeod's Daughters	Nine Network	8 August
Catalyst	ABC	9 August
The Glass House	ABC	10 August
Always Greener	Seven Network	9 September
Bush Mechanics	ABC	11 September
Escape of the Artful Dodger	Nine Network	17 September
Corridors of Power	ABC	8 October
Kids, Drugs and Growing Up	Nine Network	9 October
Changi	ABC	14 October
The Chaser election specials	ABC	23 October
Effie: Just Quietly	SBS TV	6 November
The Shapies	Nine Network	1 December
Fishing Australia	WIN Television	2001
The Great South East	Seven Network (Queensland)	2001
Hook, Line and Sinker	Southern Cross Tasmania	2001
The World Game	SBS TV	2001

==== International ====
Program	Channel	Debut date
(United States) Cupid	Network Ten	3 January
(United Kingdom) State of the Planet	ABC TV	10 January
(United Kingdom) Four Fathers	ABC TV	12 January
(United Kingdom) Dad	ABC TV	15 January
(United States) Savage Dragon	Network Ten	24 January
(United States) Passions	Seven Network	29 January
(United States) The Chimp Channel	Nine Network	29 January
(United States) The Hughleys	Seven Network	29 January
(United Kingdom) The Big Knights	ABC TV	30 January
(United States) The Wacky World of Tex Avery	Seven Network	3 February
(United States) Payne	Network Ten	5 February
(United Kingdom) Hero to Zero	ABC TV	12 February
(United States) Malcolm in the Middle	Nine Network	13 February
(Canada) Shadow Raiders	ABC TV	13 February
(United Kingdom) Big Kids	ABC TV	14 February
(Germany) Junior	Seven Network	17 February
(United States) Bette	Network Ten	17 February
(United Kingdom) / (Canada) / (France) The Baskervilles	ABC TV	26 February
(United States) Bloodlines: Murder in the Family	Seven Network	26 February
(Canada) Angela Anaconda	ABC TV	27 February
(Canada) Our Hero	ABC TV	2 March
(United Kingdom) Kiss Me Kate	ABC TV	9 March
(United Kingdom) Angelmouse	ABC TV	12 March
(United States) The Division	Nine Network	13 March
(United States) Power Rangers Lightspeed Rescue	Seven Network	24 March
(United Kingdom) Takács Quartet	SBS TV	24 March
(United Kingdom) Life Force	ABC TV	26 March
(United Kingdom) Love in a Cold Climate	ABC TV	1 April
(United States) Buzz Lightyear of Star Command	Seven Network	7 April
(United States) Spider-Man Unlimited	Network Ten	9 April
(Germany) Plonsters	ABC TV	9 April
(United States) CSI: Crime Scene Investigation	Nine Network	10 April
(United States) Too Rich: The Secret Life of Doris Duke	Nine Network	15 April
(United States) Sabrina: The Animated Series	Seven Network	28 April
(United States) The Parkers	Nine Network	4 May
(United Kingdom) The Sins	ABC TV	4 May
(United States) Ed	Network Ten	8 May
(United States) Sheep in the Big City	Nine Network	14 May
(United States) The Zeta Project	Nine Network	16 May
(United Kingdom) Pond Life	SBS TV	19 May
(Japan) Bubblegum Crisis Tokyo 2040	SBS TV	19 May
(United States) That's My Bush!	SBS TV	19 May
(United States) X-Men: Evolution	Nine Network	25 May
(United Kingdom) My Family	ABC TV	28 May
(United Kingdom) Harry and the Wrinklies	ABC TV	30 May
(United States) House of Mouse	Seven Network	2 June
(United States) / (United Kingdom) / (Wales) / (Scotland) Animated Tales of the World	SBS TV	2 June
(United Kingdom) Down to Earth	ABC TV	3 June
(United States) Arliss	Seven Network	7 June
(Canada) / (United States) Action Man (2000)	Network Ten	11 June
(United States) Night Man	Nine Network	18 June
(United Kingdom) Burnside	ABC TV	22 June
(United Kingdom) Border Cafe	ABC TV	30 June
(United Kingdom) Black Cab	ABC TV	30 June
(United States) / (Hong Kong) Jackie Chan Adventures	Network Ten	1 July
(United Kingdom) Cubeez	ABC TV	2 July
(Canada) My Best Friend is an Alien	ABC TV	2 July
(United Kingdom) Titch	ABC TV	9 July
(United Kingdom) / (Canada) Aaagh! It's the Mr. Hell Show!	SBS TV	14 July
(United States) Dark Angel	Seven Network	26 July
(United States) Boston Public	Seven Network	30 July
(United Kingdom) Lucy Sullivan is Getting Married	Nine Network	30 July
(United Kingdom) Tom and Vicky	ABC Kids (digital only)	August
(United Kingdom) PB Bear and Friends	ABC Kids (digital only)	August
(Canada) / (China) George Shrinks	ABC Kids (digital only)	August
(United States) Horrible Histories (2001 cartoon)	ABC Kids (digital only)	August
(United Kingdom) Roger and the Rottentrolls	ABC Kids (digital only)	August
(Canada) Maggie and the Ferocious Beast	ABC Kids (digital only)	1 August
(United Kingdom) Rosie and Jim	ABC Kids (digital only)	1 August
(Japan) Cardcaptors	Network Ten	6 August
(United Kingdom) Preston Pig	ABC TV, ABC Kids (digital only)	7 August
(United Kingdom) / (Hungary) The Mystery of Black Rose Castle	ABC TV, ABC Kids (digital only)	15 August
(United States) Stark Raving Mad	Seven Network	20 August
(United States) The Lone Gunmen	Seven Network	30 August
(United States) Rocket Power	Network Ten	31 August
(United States) Sylvanian Families	Network Ten	1 September
(United States) The Street	Nine Network	4 September
(United States) Courage the Cowardly Dog	Nine Network	5 September
(United States) Soldier of Fortune, Inc.	Seven Network	6 September
(United States) Mike, Lu and Og	Nine Network	10 September
(United Kingdom) Ethelbert the Tiger	ABC TV, ABC Kids (digital only)	24 September
(United States) Beverly Hills Teens	Network Ten	30 September
(United States) Sister, Sister	Seven Network	30 September
(United States) Butt-Ugly Martians	Network Ten	1 October
(United Kingdom) Bill and Ben	ABC TV, ABC Kids (digital only)	3 October
(United States) The Ananda Lewis Show	Nine Network	8 October
(Wales) / (United Kingdom) Sali Mali	ABC TV, ABC Kids (digital only)	24 October
(United Kingdom) Tiny Planets	ABC TV, ABC Kids (digital only)	30 October
(Australia) / (Canada) John Callahan's Quads!	SBS TV	12 November
(United States) Smart Guy	Seven Network	13 November
(Canada) The Kids from Room 402	Network Ten	18 November
(United Kingdom) Beast	ABC TV	19 November
(United Kingdom) El Nombre	ABC TV, ABC Kids (digital only)	19 November
(United Kingdom) Marion and Geoff	ABC TV	19 November
(United States) / (Canada) Sitting Ducks	ABC TV, ABC Kids (digital only)	19 November
(United Kingdom) In a Land of Plenty	ABC TV	19 November
(United States) What About Joan?	Network Ten	2 December
(United Kingdom) Eye Spy	Seven Network	3 December
(United Kingdom) Beware: Bad Drivers	Seven Network	3 December
(United Kingdom) The Ghost Hunter	ABC TV, ABC Kids (digital only)	5 December
(United Kingdom) Albie	ABC TV, ABC Kids (digital only)	6 December
(United States) The Fugitive (2000)	Nine Network	6 December
(United Kingdom) / (Canada) Treasure	ABC TV, ABC Kids (digital only)	6 December
(United States) The Invisible Man (2000)	Network Ten	6 December
(United Kingdom) / (Republic of Ireland) Custer's Last Stand Up	ABC TV, ABC Kids (digital only)	7 December
(United States) The Oblongs	Nine Network	8 December
(United States) Gilmore Girls	Nine Network	12 December
(United Kingdom) Human Remains	SBS TV	15 December
(United Kingdom) / (United States) Further Tales of the City	Nine Network	17 December
(Canada) Eckhart	ABC TV, ABC Kids (digital only)	20 December
(United Kingdom) Badjelly the Witch	ABC TV, ABC Kids (digital only)	25 December
(Germany) Light Through Ashes	SBS TV	30 December
(France) Oggy and the Cockroaches	ABC Kids (digital only)	2001
(France) Space Goofs	ABC Kids (digital only)	2001
(Canada) What About Mimi?	Seven Network	2001
(United Kingdom) Yoho Ahoy	ABC Kids (digital only)	2001
(United States) / (Canada) / (Germany) Weird-Oh's	Seven Network	2001
(Canada) The Zack Files	ABC Kids (digital only)	2001
(United Kingdom) Top of the Pops	ABC TV	2001

=== Changes to network affiliation ===
This is a list of programmes which made their premiere on an Australian television network that had previously premiered on another Australian television network. The networks involved in the switch of allegiances are predominantly both free-to-air networks or both subscription television networks. Programs that have their free-to-air/subscription television premiere, after previously premiering on the opposite platform (free-to air to subscription/subscription to free-to air) are not included. In some cases, programs may still air on the original television network. This occurs predominantly with programs shared between subscription television networks.

==== Domestic ====
Program	New Network(s)	Previous Network(s)	Date
Bananas in Pyjamas	ABC Kids (digital only)	ABC TV	1 August
Play School	ABC Kids (digital only)	ABC TV	1 August
Johnson and Friends	ABC Kids (digital only)	ABC TV	2001
The Ferals	ABC Kids (digital only)	ABC TV	2001
The Adventures of Blinky Bill	ABC Kids (digital only)	ABC TV	2001
Mr. Squiggle and Friends	ABC Kids (digital only)	ABC TV	2001
Kideo	ABC Kids (digital only)	ABC TV	2001

==== International ====
Program	New Network(s)	Previous Network(s)	Date
(United Kingdom) Bimble's Bucket	NBN Television	Nine Network	9 June
(United States) Sesame Street	ABC Kids (digital only)	ABC TV	1 August
(United States) / (Canada) The Magic School Bus	ABC Kids (digital only)	Network Ten	1 August
(United States) Johnny Bravo	Nine Network	Seven Network	14 September
(United States) Horrible Histories (2001 cartoon)	ABC TV	ABC Kids (digital only)	17 December
(United Kingdom) Henry's Cat	ABC Kids (digital only)	ABC TV	2001
(United Kingdom) Bob the Builder	ABC Kids (digital only)	ABC TV	2001
(United Kingdom) Teletubbies	ABC Kids (digital only)	ABC TV	2001
(United States) Bear in the Big Blue House	ABC Kids (digital only)	ABC TV	2001
(Canada) Stickin' Around	ABC Kids (digital only)	ABC TV	2001
(United States) Santo Bugito	ABC Kids (digital only)	ABC TV	2001
(United Kingdom) The Forgotten Toys	ABC Kids (digital only)	ABC TV	2001
(United Kingdom) The Animal Shelf	ABC Kids (digital only)	ABC TV	2001
(United Kingdom) Oakie Doke	ABC Kids (digital only)	ABC TV	2001
(Canada) Franklin	ABC Kids (digital only)	ABC TV	2001
(Wales) Fireman Sam	ABC Kids (digital only)	ABC TV	2001
(United States) Hey Arnold!	ABC Kids (digital only)	ABC TV	2001
(United Kingdom) Thomas the Tank Engine and Friends	ABC Kids (digital only)	ABC TV	2001
(United Kingdom) The Wombles (1996)	ABC Kids (digital only)	ABC TV	2001
(United Kingdom) Tweenies	ABC Kids (digital only)	ABC TV	2001
(France) / (Australia) Lil' Elvis Jones and the Truckstoppers	ABC Kids (digital only)	ABC TV	2001
(United Kingdom) Rocky and the Dodos	ABC Kids (digital only)	ABC TV	2001
(United Kingdom) Noddy's Toyland Adventures	ABC Kids (digital only)	ABC TV	2001
(United Kingdom) Sheeep	ABC Kids (digital only)	ABC TV	2001
(United Kingdom) / (Canada) / (France) The Baskervilles	ABC Kids (digital only)	ABC TV	2001
(Canada) / (United States) Arthur	ABC Kids (digital only)	ABC TV	2001
(Australia) / (United Kingdom) Minty	ABC Kids (digital only)	ABC TV	2001
(United Kingdom) Brambly Hedge	ABC Kids (digital only)	ABC TV	2001
(United Kingdom) The Big Knights	ABC Kids (digital only)	ABC TV	2001
(United States) CatDog	ABC Kids (digital only)	ABC TV	2001
(Germany) / (Austria) Simsala Grimm	ABC Kids (digital only)	ABC TV	2001

=== Subscription television ===
==== Domestic ====
Program	Channel	Debut date
Kate & Julia	Arena	8 August
Hooley Dooleys	Fox Kids	2001
Shock Jock	TV1	2001

==== International ====
Program	Channel	Debut date
(United Kingdom) Fat Dog Mendoza	Nickelodeon	2 January
(Canada) Yvon of the Yukon	Nickelodeon	2 January
(United States) Maury	Arena	March
(United Kingdom) / (Republic of Ireland) Custer's Last Stand Up	Nickelodeon	16 March
(United States) Looney Tunes	Boomerang	3 April
(United States) Merrie Melodies	Boomerang	3 April
(United States) Tom and Jerry	Boomerang	3 April
(United States) As Told by Ginger	Nickelodeon	7 April
(United States) Toonami	Cartoon Network	7 July
(United States) The Oblongs	Oh!	17 July
(New Zealand) Being Eve	Nickelodeon	24 August
(United States) Invader Zim	Nickelodeon	Q3/Q4
(United States) Samurai Jack	Cartoon Network	2001
(United Kingdom) The Tidings	Fox Kids	2001
(Japan) Cardcaptors	Cartoon Network	2001
(Japan) Mobile Suit Gundam Wing	Cartoon Network	2001
(United States) / (Canada) / (Germany) Rainbow Fish	Disney Channel	2001
(Canada) Theodore Tugboat	Disney Channel	2001
(United States) Super Duper Sumos	Fox Kids	2001
(Japan) Dinozaurs	Fox Kids	2001
(Germany) / (France) / (Canada) Wunschpunsch	Fox Kids	2001
(United States) Generation O!	Nickelodeon	2001
(Canada) Screech Owls	Fox Kids	2001
(United States) / (Canada) Kong: The Animated Series	Fox Kids	2001
(United States) Dora the Explorer	Nickelodeon	2001
(United States) / (Canada) Dragon Tales	Fox Kids	2001
(Canada) / (Hong Kong) Braceface	Fox Kids	2001
(United States) Adult Swim	Cartoon Network	2001
(United States) Home Movies	Cartoon Network	2001
(Scotland) Meeow!	Fox Kids	2001
(Canada) Ultimate Book of Spells	Fox Kids	2001

=== Subscription premieres ===
This is a list of programs which made their premiere on Australian subscription television that had previously premiered on Australian free-to-air television. Programs may still air on the original free-to-air television network.

==== Domestic ====
Program	Subscription network	Free-to-air network	Date
Eugénie Sandler P.I.	Nickelodeon	ABC TV	3 August
Hi-5	Fox Kids	Nine Network	2001
Escape from Jupiter	Fox Kids	ABC TV	2001

==== International ====
Program	Subscription network	Free-to-air network	Date
(Canada) / (Australia) Dumb Bunnies	Nickelodeon	Seven Network	2 January
(United Kingdom) An Actor's Life For Me	UKTV	ABC TV	10 April
(United States) Angel	Fox8	Seven Network	24 April
(United Kingdom) Full Wax	UKTV	ABC TV	1 June
(United Kingdom) The Brittas Empire	UKTV	ABC TV	6 June
(United States) Friends	Oh!	Nine Network	3 July
(United States) The Drew Carey Show	Oh!	Nine Network	July
(United States) ER	Oh!	Nine Network	August
(United Kingdom) Thomas the Tank Engine and Friends	Nickelodeon	ABC TV	2001
(France) Insektors	Fox Kids	ABC TV	2001
(United Kingdom) Budgie the Little Helicopter	Fox Kids	ABC TV	2001
(Canada) Freaky Stories	Nickelodeon	ABC TV	2001
(New Zealand) Oscar and Friends	Nickelodeon	ABC TV	2001
(Canada) What About Mimi?	Fox Kids	Seven Network	2001
(United Kingdom) Cubeez	Fox Kids	ABC TV	2001
(United States) / (Canada) / (Germany) Weird-Oh's	Fox Kids	Seven Network	2001

== Specials ==
Program	Channel	Debut date
(United States) 2001 Kids' Choice Awards	Nickelodeon	12 May

== Television shows ==
ABC

- Four Corners (1961–present)
- The Fat (2000–2003)

Seven Network

- Wheel of Fortune (1981–2006, 2024–present)
- Home and Away (1988–present)
- Blue Heelers (1994–2006)
- Today Tonight (1995–2019)
- All Saints (1998–2009)
- Ground Force (1999–2004)
- AMV (2000–2002)

Nine Network

- Today (1982–present)
- Sale of the Century (1980–2001)
- A Current Affair (1971–1978, 1988–present)
- Australia's Funniest Home Video Show (1990–2014)
- The AFL Footy Show (1994–2019)
- The NRL Footy Show (1994–2018)
- Water Rats (1996–2001)
- Burgo's Catch Phrase (1997–2003, 2002–2003)
- Who Wants to Be a Millionaire? (1999–2006, 2007–2010)
- Surprise Surprise (2000–2001)
- Backyard Blitz (2000–2007)

Network Ten

- Neighbours (1985–2025)
- GMA With Bert Newton (1991–2005)
- Rove Live (2000–2006)

== Ending / resting this year ==
Date	Show	Channel	Debut
5 January	Zirkos Kids	NBN Television	2000
2 March	Open Learning	ABC	1992
1 April	Greed	Channel Ten	11 February 2001
9 April	The Micallef P(r)ogram(me)	ABC	1998
26 April	Quantum	ABC	1985
8 May	Flat Chat	Channel Nine	19 February 2001
24 June	Couch Potato	ABC	1991
24 July	Love Is a Four Letter Word	ABC	30 January 2001
6 August	Water Rats	Channel Nine	1996
16 August	Above the Law	Channel Ten	2000
19 August	Wild Kat	Channel Ten	2 June 2001
25 August	Crash Zone	Channel Seven	1999
21 September	Denise	Channel Seven	1998
29 November	Burgo's Catch Phrase	Channel Nine	1997
29 November	Sale of the Century	Channel Nine	1980
2 December	Head Start	ABC	4 March 2001
10 December	Escape of the Artful Dodger	Channel Nine	17 September 2001
	Consuming Passions	ABC	1992

== See also ==
- 2001 in Australia
- List of Australian films of 2001
