= Vincent Sheehan (producer) =

Australian filmmaker

Vincent Sheehan is an Australian film producer. He was also co-creator of the 2016 sci-fi drama series The Kettering Incident (2016) and the comedy series Fisk, co-created by and starring Kitty Flanagan. Sheehan was a founding partner in Porchlight Films (1997–2020), before establishing his own production company, Origma 45.

== Early life and education ==
Vincent Sheehan attended the Sydney College of the Arts and played in rock bands through his 20s. He then did a degree in communications at University of Technology Sydney.

== Career ==
=== Film ===
Sheehan started working in the film industry after graduating from UTS, starting at a community training and production studio called Metro Screen. While he was there, he produced David Caesar's film Mullet, which was funded by SBS independent and Globe. At that time, he cited New York producers James Schamus, Ted Hope, and Christine Vachon as role models, saying "they don't compromise and they work outside the models". His next film was Walking on Water (2002), directed by Tony Ayres and partly funded by the Adelaide Film Festival.

In 2011, he produced The Hunter, the directorial debut feature of Daniel Nettheim, who went on to direct episodes of the British series Line of Duty, Broadchurch, and Doctor Who. After his company had optioned the book, it took around nine years for the film to reach production; Sheehan saying that "the challenging part was getting the script right".

Sheehan co-produced, with director Noora Niasari, her debut feature film Shayda, released in 2023.

=== Television ===
In 2016, Sheehan co-created the award-winning TV series The Kettering Incident, along with Victoria Madden.

He co-produced, with Tanya Phegan and director Peter Duncan, the 2020 ABC series Operation Buffalo, starring Ewen Leslie, Jessica De Gouw, and James Cromwell.

Sheehan co-created, executive-produced, and co-produced Kitty Flanagan's award-winning series Fisk. Sheehan came up with the idea for setting a drama in a wills and probate office, and approached Flanagan, whom he had known for many years, to write the series. The series was co-written by Kitty Flanagan's sister, Penny Flanagan.

== Other activities ==
Sheehan was on the judging panel for the fifth edition of AACTA Pitch: Focus, a national short film production and development initiative open to Australian student filmmakers, which closed in September 2025.

Along with actor Yael Stone and producer Ian Collie (Colin from Accounts), Sheehan was also on the judging panel of the 2025/2026 Creative Wollongong Short Film Competition.

== Production companies ==
=== Porchlight Films ===
In 1997 Sheehan co-founded film production company Porchlight Films with Liz Watts and Anita Sheehan, which produced 15 feature films, five television series, two documentaries, and three short films during its existence, including:

- Little Fish (2005), directed by Rowan Woods and starring Cate Blanchett, winner of many awards
- The Home Song Stories (2007), Tony Ayres biographical feature film, starring Joan Chen
- Animal Kingdom (2010), David Michôd's directorial debut which won several awards (Liz Watts)
- Laid (2011-2), a TV series created by Marieke Hardy and Kirsty Fisher, starring Alison Bell and Celia Pacquola
- The Hunter (2011), directorial debut for Daniel Nettheim, starring Willem Dafoe (Vincent Sheehan)
- Dead Europe (2012), starring Ewen Leslie, Marton Csokas, and Kodi Smit-McPhee
- The Kettering Incident (2016), created by Vicki Madden and Vincent Sheehan, starring Elizabeth Debicki and Matthew Le Nevez, winner of the AACTA Award for Best Telefeature or Mini Series as well as other awards
- Jasper Jones (2017), directed by Rachel Perkins, starring Toni Collette and Hugo Weaving
- True History of the Kelly Gang (2020), directed by Justin Kurzel, starring George MacKay, Essie Davis, and Russell Crowe
- Operation Buffalo (2020), an ABC TV series directed by Peter Duncan and starring Ewen Leslie, Jessica De Gouw, and James Cromwell

The company was actively engaged with Screen Producers Australia.

The company ceased operations in June 2020, having made Watts and Vincent Sheehan continued to work on individual projects, while Anita Sheehan, who was appointed managing director of Porchlight in 2015, went on to pursue other avenues. The three partners retain ownership of Jetty Distribution, which manages ongoing rights for Porchlight productions.

=== Origma 45 ===
Sheehan subsequently founded his own production company, Origma 45, with Anwyn Watkins as production executive. Fisk and Shayda were produced through this company.

== Accolades ==
In the 6th AACTA Awards in 2016, The Kettering Incident won Best Telefeature or Mini Series, with Sheehan, Victoria Madden, and Andrew Walker the recipients of the award.

In 2017, in the 7th AACTA Awards, Jasper Jones was nominated for the AACTA Award for Best Film, but Lion won the award.

In 2020, Operation Buffalo, credited with Sheehan, Tanya Phegan, and Peter Duncan, was nominated for the AACTA Award for Best Telefeature or Mini Series, but did not win the award.

In 2021, Sheehan won the AACTA Award for Best Narrative Comedy Series for Fisk.
