= 6th AACTA Awards =

Australian film and television awards ceremony

- Date: 5 December 2016 and 7 December 2016
- Site: The Star Event Centre; Sydney, New South Wales

Television coverage
- Network: Seven Network; Arena
- Ratings: 416,000

The 6th Australian Academy of Cinema and Television Arts Awards (generally known as AACTA Awards) are a series of awards which includes the 6th AACTA Awards Luncheon, the 6th AACTA Awards ceremony and the 6th AACTA International Awards. The former two events were held at The Star Event Centre, in Sydney, New South Wales. Presented by the Australian Academy of Cinema and Television Arts (AACTA), the awards celebrate the best in Australian feature film, television, documentary and short film productions of 2016. The first winners announced on 5 December 2016 and the AACTA Awards ceremony occurred on 7 December 2016 and was broadcast on the Seven Network for the second year running with an extended broadcast to air on Arena.

The first round of nominees, for Best Feature Length Documentary, Best Short Animation and Best Short Fiction Film, were announced on 14 July 2016. A new feature film and television category for Best Hair and Makeup was presented for the first time. Through a partnership with Australian Subscription Television and Radio Association (ASTRA) five additional awards, for subscription television programs, were handed out for Best Lifestyle Program, Best New Talent, Best Male Presenter, Best Female Presenter and Best Live Event Production.

== Nominees ==
The nominations are as follows:

=== Feature film ===
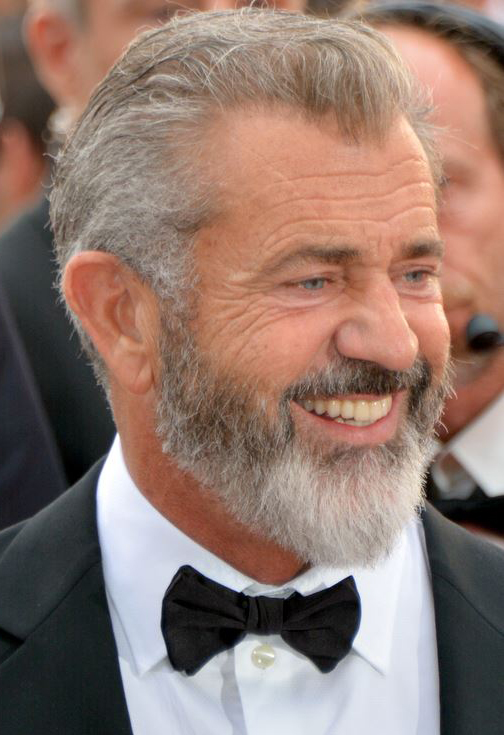
Mel Gibson, winner of Best Direction

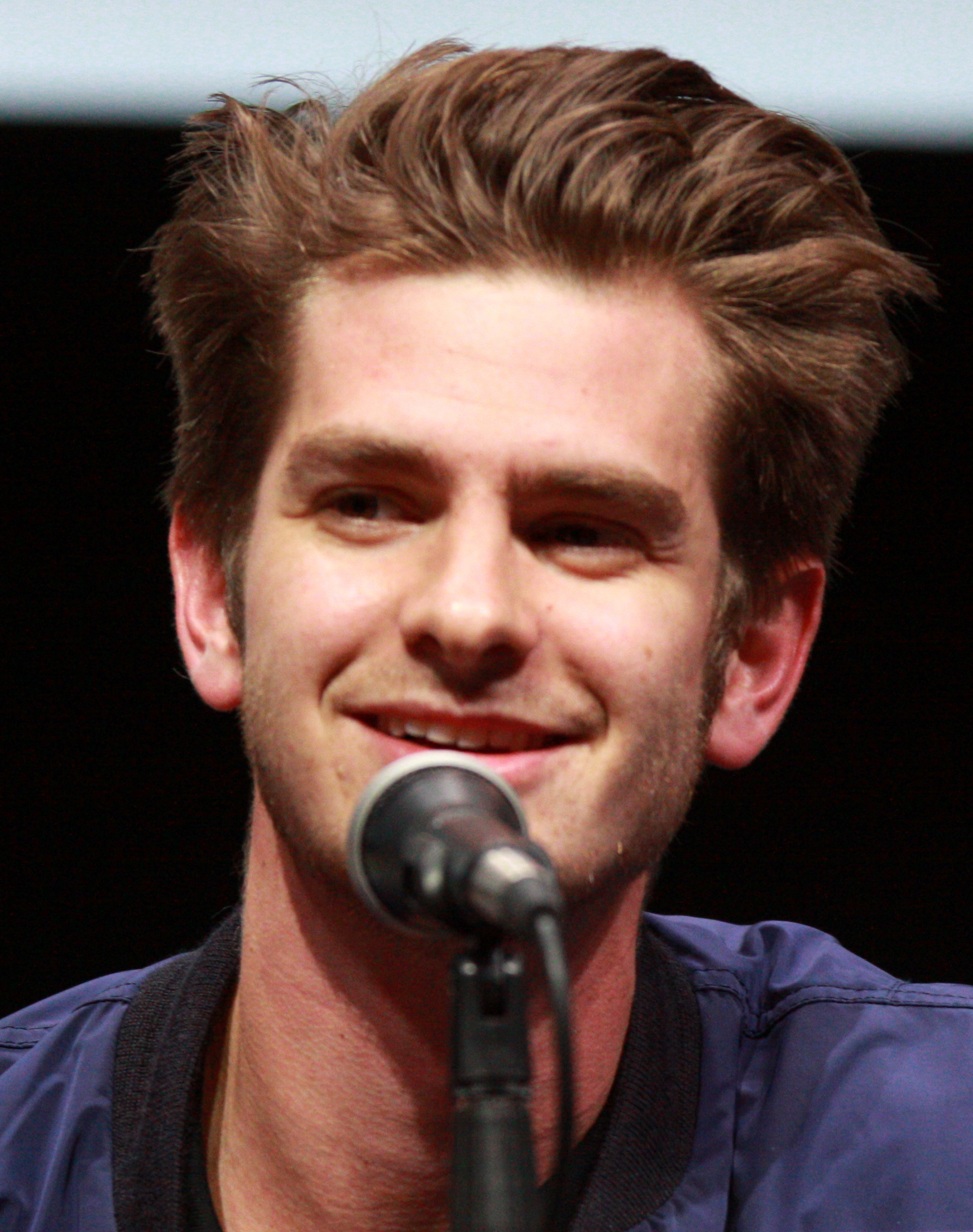
Andrew Garfield, winner of Best Lead Actor

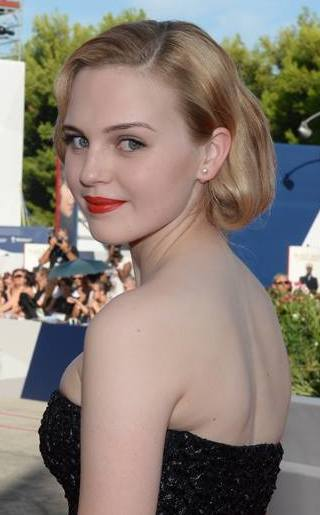
Odessa Young, winner of Best Lead Actress

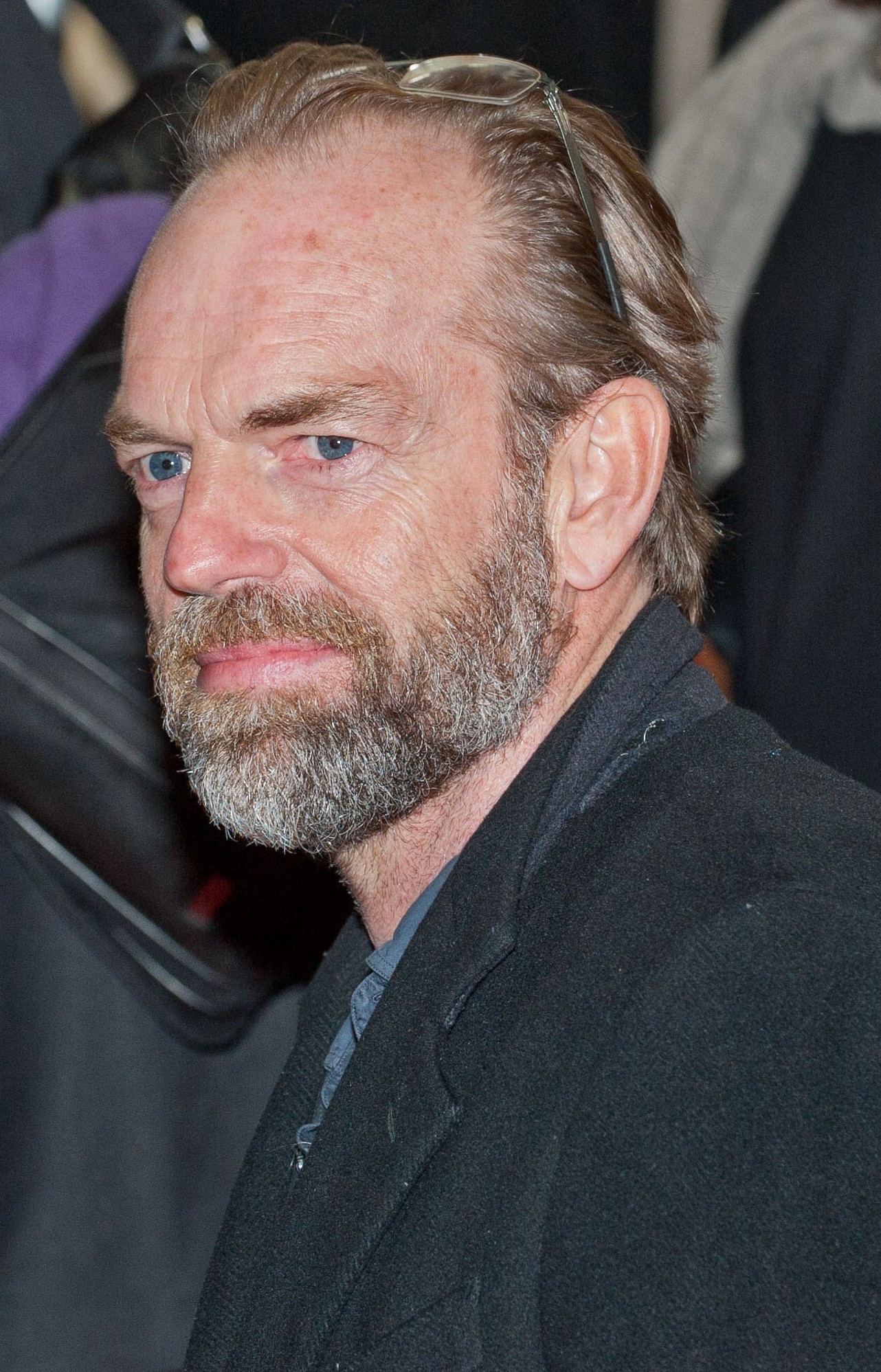
Hugo Weaving, winner of Best Supporting Actor

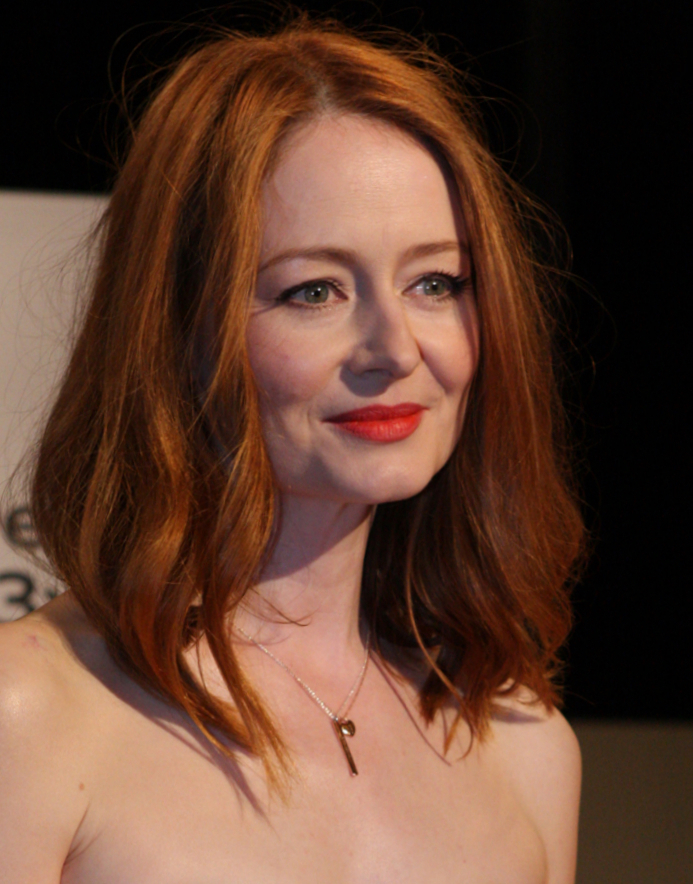
Miranda Otto, winner of Best Supporting Actress

Best Film: Hacksaw Ridge – Bill Mechanic, David Permut, Paul Currie, Bruce Davey; The Daughter – Jan Chapman, Nicole O'Donohue; Girl Asleep – Jo Dyer; Goldstone – Greer Simpkin, David Jowsey; Tanna – Martin Butler, Bentley Dean, Carolyn Johnson	Best Direction: Mel Gibson – Hacksaw Ridge; Rosemary Myers – Girl Asleep; Ivan Sen – Goldstone; Bentley Dean, Martin Butler – Tanna
Best Original Screenplay	Best Adapted Screenplay
Andrew Knight, Robert Schenkkan – Hacksaw Ridge; Abe Forsythe – Down Under; Ivan Sen – Goldstone; Damian Hill – Pawno	Simon Stone – The Daughter, based on the play The Wild Duck by Henrik Ibsen; Matthew Whittet – Girl Asleep, based on the play Girl Asleep by Matthew Whittet
Best Lead Actor	Best Lead Actress
Andrew Garfield as Desmond Doss – Hacksaw Ridge; John Brumpton as Les Underwood – Pawno; Damian Hill as Danny Williamson – Pawno; Ewen Leslie as Oliver – The Daughter	Odessa Young as Hedvig – The Daughter; Maeve Dermody as Kate – Pawno; Maggie Naouri as Anu Singh – Joe Cinque's Consolation; Teresa Palmer as Dorothy Schutte – Hacksaw Ridge
Best Supporting Actor	Best Supporting Actress
Hugo Weaving as Tom Doss – Hacksaw Ridge; Mark Coles Smith as Pauly – Pawno; Damon Herriman as Jason – Down Under; Sam Neill as Walter – The Daughter	Miranda Otto as Charlotte – The Daughter; Kerry Armstrong as Jennifer Montgomery – Pawno; Rachel Griffiths as Bertha Doss – Hacksaw Ridge; Anna Torv as Anna – The Daughter
Best Cinematography	Best Editing
Simon Duggan – Hacksaw Ridge; Andrew Commis – Girl Asleep; Bonnie Elliott – Spear; Bentley Dean – Tanna	John Gilbert – Hacksaw Ridge; Veronika Jenet – The Daughter; Karryn de Cinque – Girl Asleep; Ivan Sen – Goldstone
Best Original Music Score	Best Sound
Antony Partos – Tanna; Darrin Verhagen – Boys in the Trees; Marco Beltrami – Gods of Egypt; David Barber – Teenage Kicks	Andrew Wright, Robert Mackenzie, Kevin O'Connell, Mario Vaccaro, Tara Webb, Peter Grace – Hacksaw Ridge; Liam Egan, Nick Emond, Tony Murtagh, James Andrews, Yulia Akerholt, Robert Sullivan – The Daughter; Wayne Pashley, Peter Grace, Derryn Pasquill, Fabian Sanjurjo, Greg P. Fitzgerald, Peter Purcell – Gods of Egypt; Emma Bortignon, James Ashton, Martin Butler – Tanna
Best Production Design	Best Costume Design
Barry Robinson – Hacksaw Ridge; Steven Jones-Evans – The Daughter; Jonathon Oxlade – Girl Asleep; Matt Putland – Goldstone	Jonathon Oxlade – Girl Asleep; Liz Palmer – Gods of Egypt; Lizzy Gardiner – Hacksaw Ridge; Jennifer Irwin – Spear

=== Television ===
Best Drama Series: Wentworth – Pino Amenta, Jo Porter - Foxtel/SoHo; The Code – David Maher, David Taylor, Shelley Birse, Diane Haddon - ABC; Jack Irish – Ian Collie, Andrew Knight - ABC; Rake – Ian Collie, Peter Duncan, Richard Roxburgh - ABC	Best Telefeature, Mini Series or Short Run Series: The Kettering Incident – Vincent Sheehan, Victoria Madden, Andrew Walker - Foxtel/Showcase; Barracuda – Tony Ayres, Amanda Higgs - ABC; The Beautiful Lie – John Edwards, Imogen Banks - ABC; Molly – John Molloy - Seven Network
Best Comedy Series	Best Light Entertainment Series
Upper Middle Bogan – Robyn Butler, Wayne Hope, Ben Grogan - ABC; Black Comedy – Kath Shelper, Mark O'Toole - ABC; The Family Law – Sophie Miller, Julie Eckersley, Debbie Lee, Tony Ayres - SBS; Please Like Me – Todd Abbott, Josh Thomas, Lisa Wang, Kevin Whyte - ABC	Gruen – Jon Casimir - ABC; Gogglebox – David McDonald, Kam Vurlow - Foxtel/Lifestyle; Luke Warm Sex – Jon Casimir, Richard Huddleston, Karina Holden, Anna Bateman - ABC; RocKwiz – Peter Bain-Hogg, Ken Connor, Brian Nankervis - SBS
Best Children's Series	Best Reality Series
Beat Bugs – Josh Wakely, Jennifer Twiner McCarron – 7Two; Bottersnikes & Gumbles – Patrick Egerton – Seven Network; The Deep – Avrill Stark, Asaph Fipke, Tom Taylor – 7Two; Play School – Jan Stradling, Sophie Emtage, Sarah Dabro, Rebecca O'Brien– ABC 2	Masterchef Australia – Marty Benson, Tim Toni, Rob Wallace - Network Ten; First Dates – Geraldine Orrock, Bikkie Proost, Brad Gustafson - Seven Network; My Kitchen Rules – Matt Apps, Joe Herdman, Rikkie Proost - Seven Network; The Recruit – Luke Tuncliffe, Lara Hopkins - Foxtel/Fox8
Best Lifestyle Program
Destination Flavour – Erik Dwyer, Rachel Hardie - SBS; Grand Designs Australia – Anna Gregory - Foxtel/Lifestyle; Poh & Co. – Erik Dwyer - SBS; River Cottage Australia – Judi Boylan - Foxtel/Lifestyle
Best Lead Actor – Drama	Best Lead Actress – Drama
Samuel Johnson – Molly – Seven Network; Matt Nable – Barracuda – ABC; Richard Roxburgh – Rake – ABC; Ashley Zukerman – The Code – ABC	Elizabeth Debicki – The Kettering Incident – Foxtel/Showcase; Danielle Cormack – Wentworth – Foxtel/SoHo; Pamela Rabe – Wentworth – Foxtel/SoHo; Sarah Snook – The Beautiful Lie – ABC
Best Guest or Supporting Actor – Drama	Best Guest or Supporting Actress – Drama
Damon Herriman – Secret City, Episode 1 – A Donation to the Struggle – Foxtel/Showcase; Russell Dykstra – Rake, Episode 8 – ABC; Ben Gerrard – Molly, Part 1 – Seven Network; Hamish Michael – Janet King – The Invisible Wound, Episode 8 – The Long Goodbye – ABC	Celia Pacquola – The Beautiful Lie, Episode 3 – ABC; Caroline Brazier – Rake, Episode 8 – ABC; Sacha Horler – The Kettering Incident, Episode 3 – Foxtel/Showcase; Sianoa Smit-McPhee – The Kettering Incident, Episode 1 – Foxtel/Showcase
Best Direction in a Drama or Comedy	Best Direction in a Light Entertainment, Lifestyle or Reality Series
Peter Duncan – Rake, Episode 8 – ABC; Shawn Seet – The Code, Episode 1 – ABC; Rowan Woods – The Kettering Incident, Episode 1 – Foxtel/Showcase; Kevin Carlin – Wentworth, Episode 12 – Seeing Red – Foxtel/SoHo	Michael Venables – The Recruit, Episode 2 – Foxtel/Fox8; Hayden Guppy – Luke Warm Sex, Episode 4 – It's A Pleasure To Meet You – ABC; Richard Franc – MasterChef Australia, Episode 41 – Network Ten; Claude Gonzalez – Meet the Mavericks, Episode 1 – Ben Quilty & Warwick Thornton – ABC
Best Comedy Performance	Best Screenplay in Television
Patrick Brammall – No Activity – Stan; Alison Bell – ABC Comedy Showroom – The Letdown – ABC; Fiona Choi – The Family Law – SBS; Leah Purcell – Black Comedy – ABC	Sarah Scheller, Alison Bell – ABC Comedy Showroom – The Letdown – ABC; Jonathan Gavin – The Beautiful Lie, Episode 3 – ABC; Victoria Madden – The Kettering Incident, Episode 1 – Foxtel/Showcase; Robyn Butler, Wayne Hope – Upper Middle Bogan, Episode 1 – New Kids on the Block – ABC
Best Cinematography in Television	Best Editing in Television
Geoffrey Hall – Wolf Creek, Episode 3 – Salt Lake – Stan; Henry Pierce – A Place to Call Home, Episode 1 – A Nagging Doubt – Foxtel; John Brawley – The Beautiful Lie, Episode 3 – ABC; Ari Wegner – The Kettering Incident, Episode 3 – Foxtel/Showcase	Ben Joss – Wentworth, Episode 3 – Prisoner – Foxtel/SoHo; Denise Haratzis – The Beautiful Lie, Episode 6 – ABC; Nicole La Macchia – Janet King – The Invisible Wound, Episode 6 – The Thaw – ABC; Mark Perry – Rake, Episode 8 – ABC
Best Sound in Television	Best Original Music Score in Television
Guntis Sics, Michol Marsh, Peter Hall, Olivia Monteith – Rake, Episode 7 – ABC; John McKerrow, Glenn Newnham, Cameron Grant, Blair Slater, Andrew Neil, Paul Pirola – The Beautiful Lie, Episode 6 – ABC; Wes Chew, Luke Mynott, Tom Herdman, Mick Boraso, Blair Slater, Nick Emond – Deep Water, Chapter 1 – SBS; Ernie Rose, Tim Milliken, Michael Letho, Todd Shattock – RocKwiz Episode 7 – RocKwiz Salutes the Legends of Australia – SBS	Matteo Zingales, Max Lyandvert – The Kettering Incident, Episode 1 – Foxtel/Showcase; Nerida Tyson-Chew – The Deep, Episode 11 – Monster Hunter – 7Two/ABC; Antony Partos – Deep Water, Chapter 1 – SBS; Elena Kats-Chernin – The Divorce, Episode 1 – ABC
Best Production Design in Television	Best Costume Design in Television
Sam Rickard – Mary: The Making of a Princess – Network Ten; Fiona Donovan – A Place to Call Home (season 4), Episode 1 – A Nagging Doubt – Foxtel; Elizabeth Mary Moore – The Beautiful Lie, Episode 3 – ABC; Ben Morieson, Carrie Kennedy – Molly, Part 1 – Seven Network	Edie Kurzer – Molly, Part 1 – Seven Network; Lisa Meagher – A Place to Call Home (season 4), Episode 1 – A Nagging Doubt – Foxtel; Erin Roche – The Beautiful Lie, Episode 3 – ABC; Jan Hurley – Mary: The Making of a Princess – Network Ten

=== Documentary ===
Best Feature Length Documentary: Chasing Asylum – Eva Orner; In the Shadow of the Hill – Dan Jackson; Remembering the Man – Nickolas Bird and Eleanor Sharpe; Snow Monkey – Lizzette Atkins and George Gittoes	Best Documentary Television Program: Hitting Home – Nial Fulton, Sarah Ferguson, Ivan O'Mahoney - ABC; #blacklivesmatter – Sally Sara, Matthew Davis - ABC; Changing Minds: The Inside Story – Karina Holden, Alison Black, Jenni Wilks - ABC; Matilda and Me – Ivan O'Mahoney, Nial Fulton, Nel Minchin - ABC
Best Direction in a Documentary	Best Cinematography in a Documentary
Anna Broinowski – Hanson: Please Explain - SBS; Cian O'Clery – Changing Minds: The Inside Story Episode 1 - ABC; Eva Orner – Chasing Asylum; Nicole Ma – Putuparri and the Rainmakers	Dan Jackson – In the Shadow of the Hill; Matt Nettheim – Another Country; Simon Morris, Cian O'Clery – Changing Minds: The Inside Story Episode 1 - ABC; Simon Morris – DNA Nation Episode 3 - SBS
Best Editing in a Documentary	Best Sound in a Documentary
Steven Robinson, Dan Jackson – In the Shadow of the Hill; Andrew Cooke – Hitting Home Episode 1 – ABC; Nickolas Bird, Tony Stevens, Eleanor Sharpe – Remembering the Man; Nick Meyers – Snow Monkey	James Currie, Pete Smith, Tom Heuzenroeder – Highly Strung; James Currie, Tom Heuzenroeder – Another Country; Andy Wright, Diego Ruiz, Mario Vaccaro, Adam Connolly – Chasing Asylum; Mark Street, Doron Kipen, Dan Jackson – In the Shadow of the Hill
Best Original Music Score in a Documentary
Cezary Skubiszewski – Monsieur Mayonnaise; Amanda Brown – The Diplomat, the Artist and the Suit – ABC; Kevin Kiner – In the Shadow of the Hill; Elena Kats-Chernin, Alies Sluiter – Michelle's Story – ABC

=== Short film ===
Best Short Animation Oscar Wilde's The Nightingale and the Rose – Angie Fielder, Brendan Fletcher and Del Kathryn Barton: The Albatross – Joel Best, Alex Jeremy and Alex Karonis; The Crossing – Marieka Walsh and Donna Chang; Femme Enfant – Bonnie Forsyth and Grace Lim	Best Short Fiction Film Dream Baby – Lucy Gaffy and Kiki Dillon: Bluey – Darlene Johnson and Heather Oxenham; Homebodies – Yianni Warnock and Charles Williams; Nathan Loves Ricky Martin – Steven Arriagada, Llewellyn Michael Bates and Bryan Chau

=== Other awards ===
Best Visual Effects or Animation Joe Bauer, Steve Kullback, Glenn Melenhorst and Ineke Majoor – Game of Thrones, season six, episode 9: "Battle of the Bastards" (Showcase): Joe Bauer, Steve Kullback, Sam Conway, Hubert Maston and Anthony Smith – Game of Thrones, The Winds of Winter (Showcase); Eric Durst, Jack Geist, Andrew Hellen, James Whitlam and Julian Dimsey – Gods of Egypt; John Dykstra, Matt Sloan, Blondel Aidoo, Stephen Hamilton, Tim Crosbie and Dennis Jones – X-Men: Apocalypse	Best Hair and Makeup Kath Brown, Simon Joseph and Troy Follington – Cleverman (ABC): Wizzy Molineaux – A Place to Call Home (Foxtel); Lesley Vanderwalt, Lara Jade Birch and Adam Johansen – Gods of Egypt; Shane Thomas, Larry Van Duynhoven and Noriko Watanabe – Hacksaw Ridge

=== Special awards ===
- Longford Lyell Award - Paul Hogan, for his work as an actor, producer and writer.
- Trailblazer Award - Isla Fisher, for her work as an actress.
- Byron Kennedy Award - Lynette Wallworth, for her work as a filmmaker and her use of virtual reality and the mixing of technology with art.

== Productions with multiple nominations ==
=== Feature film ===
- Twelve: Hacksaw Ridge
- Ten: The Daughter
- Seven: Girl Asleep
- Six: Pawno
- Five: Goldstone, Tanna, Gods of Egypt
- Two: Down Under, Spear
