= Laid (American TV series) =

- Genre: Romantic comedy
- Based on: Laid by: Marieke Hardy; Kirsty Fisher
- Developed by: Nahnatchka Khan & Sally Bradford McKenna
- Starring: Stephanie Hsu; Zosia Mamet; Michael Angarano; Tommy Martinez
- Music by: Mike Andrews
- Country of origin: United States
- Original language: English
- No. of seasons: 1
- No. of episodes: 8

Production
- Executive producers: John Davis; John Fox; Marieke Hardy; Kirsty Fisher; Liz Watts; Stephanie Hsu; Jennifer Carreras; Sally Bradford McKenna; Nahnatchka Khan
- Producers: Abbey Caldwell; Justin McEwen
- Cinematography: Judd Overton
- Editors: Jeremy Cohen; Tara Timpone
- Running time: 29–35 minutes
- Production companies: Fierce Baby Productions; That's Bananas; Davis Entertainment; All3Media International; Porchlight Films; Universal Television

Original release
- Network: Peacock
- Release: December 19, 2024

Laid is an American romantic comedy television series developed by Nahnatchka Khan and Sally Bradford McKenna. It is based on the Australian television series of the same name. The series premiered on Peacock on December 19, 2024. In May 2025, the series was canceled after one season.

== Plot ==
Ruby, a thirty-something single woman, is discovering that some of the people with whom she has had a sexual relationship are dying. Her best friend, AJ, assists Ruby with recalling her sex timeline, and helps her warn her past partners of impending danger.

== Cast and characters ==
=== Main ===
- Stephanie Hsu as Ruby Yao, a 33-year-old single Seattle-based party planner who is trying to solve why her sex partners are dying in the order she slept with them
- Zosia Mamet as AJ, Ruby's best friend and roommate
- Michael Angarano as Richie, one of the people Ruby slept with and her ex of 3 years
- Tommy Martinez as Isaac Torres, a client who hires Ruby to plan his parents' 40th anniversary party with whom Ruby shares a connection

=== Recurring ===
- Andre Hyland as Zack, AJ's boyfriend
- Elizabeth Bowen as Debra, Ruby's therapist
- Olivia Holt as Merci, Isaac's girlfriend who is a marine biologist
- Ryan Pinkston as Brad, Ruby's co-worker
- David Denman as Detective Brenowitz
- Susan Berger as Jill Blanch, Ruby's and AJ's crabby elderly upstairs neighbor

== Episodes ==
No.	Title	Directed by	Written by	Original release date
1	"Brandon from College"	Nahnatchka Khan	Teleplay by : Sally Bradford McKenna & Nahnatchka Khan	December 19, 2024
Ruby, a 33-year-old single party planner, struggles to find love. After an unsuccessful date with Jason, she attends an appointment with her newest client Isaac and is instantly smitten with him. While there, she receives a text from AJ that her college boyfriend Brandon has died. Ruby goes to his funeral and reconnects with Jeffery, another former fling. Ruby is surprised to discover that Brandon never got over her, realizing that it was because she was his first sexual relationship. A distraught Ruby attempts to kiss Jeffery, who is appalled and storms out before he is suddenly hit by a car. Later, she drunkenly calls her first love, David, and is surprised to learn that he too is dead.
2	"FB to the T"	Nahnatchka Khan	Sally Bradford McKenna & Nahnatchka Khan	December 19, 2024
After another one of Ruby's exes dies from a traumatic brain injury, she panics and goes to the doctor to test for STDs, only to be told that she is perfectly healthy. Deeming the recent deaths an extremely bizarre coincidence, she and AJ, who has recently dumped her boyfriend Zack, go to the wedding of another one of Ruby's old boyfriends. While there, she has a conversation with the groom, who reveals he is terminally ill and lambasts her for her selfishness. She confides in Zack, and they end up drunkenly sleeping together, much to her horror. The next day, AJ reveals she and Zack have rekindled their relationship. Ruby then confirms the death of another one of her exes and is shocked to realize they've all died in the order she slept with them.
3	"Sex Cluster"	Mo Marable	Billy Finnegan	December 19, 2024
AJ makes a board detailing all of Ruby's relationships in an attempt to find a pattern between deaths. Ruby comes to the conclusion that she has a stalker who is killing her exes; she takes her concerns to the police, who are skeptical. Ruby later goes to Isaac's house to discuss his parents' upcoming anniversary party, and mistakenly believes he is the stalker, but AJ convinces her that what's happening is clearly a supernatural phenomenon. Together, they advise several exes in Ruby's "sex cluster", all of whom react negatively and dismiss her. She is later kidnapped by a mysterious figure.
4	"Flagstaff"	Mo Marable	Jeff Chiang	December 19, 2024
Ruby's kidnapper reveals himself as Richie, her ex-boyfriend of 3 years. He too chastises her for her behavior during their relationship but ultimately lets her go. Ruby wants to tell AJ that she and Zack slept together, but Zack convinces her not to. Ruby later finds out that several people in her sex cluster have all seemingly died in a variety of ways. Ruby warns her next ex, John Early, and goes back to Isaac's house and confides in him about her problems. The two dance together to the Greatest Showman soundtrack but are caught by Isaac's girlfriend Merci. Ruby realizes she has feelings for Isaac but doesn't want to risk putting him in danger. She goes back to Richie's apartment to identify his body but is surprised to find him still alive. As a news broadcast announces Early's death, Ruby and Richie realize he's a loophole in her sex cluster.
5	"Secret Soft"	Nahnatchka Khan	David Smithyman	December 19, 2024
Ruby and AJ theorize that the deaths in Ruby's sex cluster is due to her "unfinished business" with them. Ruby tells both Richie and her therapist about her complicated feelings for Isaac; Richie offers to let Ruby have sex with him while imagining Isaac, and Ruby's therapist suggests she take a break from romance. Zack discovers Ruby's sex cluster board and realizes he too is in danger; he later admits this to an anonymous player on an online gaming forum, who is revealed to be Merci. Later, Isaac finds Ruby and reveals he broke up with Merci because of his feelings for Ruby and kisses her; Ruby turns him down, saying she doesn't want to hurt him, but Isaac says he'll wait until she's ready. Ruby takes Richie up on his offer and has sex with him, imagining him as Isaac. She later goes home and discovers that Zack has confessed to AJ about their night together.
6	"More Handsome than Joe Jonas"	Nahnatchka Khan	Abbey Caldwell	December 19, 2024
AJ kicks Ruby and Zack out of her apartment after finding out that they slept together; Ruby crashes with Richie for the time being. Together, they go to warn Aubrey, who Ruby deems "the one who got away". Aubrey advises Ruby to reconnect with her estranged father before she's suddenly killed in the crossfire of an outside shootout. Richie consoles Ruby following the ordeal and encourages her to apologize to AJ. The next day, Ruby and Richie go to her work when AJ suddenly appears and reveals an old video of Ruby's coworker Brad admitting he put a hex on her.
7	"Toby and Lindsey Are Here"	Nahnatchka Khan	Ria Sardana	December 19, 2024
As Ruby, Richie, and AJ confront Brad about the hex, Isaac walks in and confronts Ruby for avoiding him. Ruby confesses everything to him and he leaves, not believing her. As Brad recalls the night he put the hex on Ruby, he admits he had a woman he met at a bar do it on his behalf. They manage to find the woman and confront her; however, she says she cannot undo the hex and that Ruby can instead transfer it to someone else. Ruby immediately contemplates transferring the hex, but AJ condemns her for being selfish. Feeling guilty, Ruby decides to keep the hex, when Isaac suddenly appears and admits he now believes her story, declaring he wants to be with her regardless.
8	"Il Mostro del Sesso"	Nahnatchka Khan	Sally Bradford McKenna & Nahnatchka Khan	December 19, 2024
Ruby and Isaac navigate their new relationship without sexual intimacy as Ruby also prepares to meet his parents at their anniversary party. Ruby meets with Richie, who denies having feelings for her and kicks her out of his apartment. AJ receives an invitation, seemingly from Zack, to meet at a restaurant, which is revealed to be a private dinner with her idol Amanda Knox. AJ deduces the invitation actually came from Ruby and the two ultimately reconcile as AJ gives Ruby blessing to transfer the hex. They decide to transfer it to their elderly upstairs neighbor, Jill Blanch, and wait a month for results. A month later, Ruby checks in with her ex Jason at a marathon, who seems perfectly healthy. Believing the hex to be lifted, Ruby and Isaac have sex for the first time. Suddenly, Ruby's estranged father appears at her door, and they receive news that Jason has in fact died, meaning the transfer was unsuccessful (and that Isaac is now in danger as well). Ruby's father offers to help, admitting that whatever's happening to Ruby happened to him as well.

== Production ==
=== Development ===
On January 11, 2024, Peacock gave production a straight-to-series order for Laid. It is based on the Australian television series series of the same name. The series was developed by Nahnatchka Khan and Sally Bradford McKenna who also executive produced alongside Marieke Hardy, Kirsty Fisher, Liz Watts, John Davis, John Fox, Jennifer Carreras, and Stephanie Hsu. Production companies involved producing the series are Universal Television, Fierce Baby, Davis Entertainment, Porchlight Films, and All3Media International. On May 29, 2025, Peacock canceled the series after one season.

=== Casting ===
Upon the series order announcement, Hsu was cast to star. On March 13, 2024, Zosia Mamet, Michael Angarano, and Tommy Martinez joined the cast as series regulars.

== Release ==
Laid was released on Peacock on December 19, 2024.

== Reception ==
The review aggregator website Rotten Tomatoes reported a 97% approval rating with an average rating of 6.5/10, based on 29 critic reviews. The website's critics consensus reads, "A breezy showcase for Stephanie Hsu's considerable comedic chops, Laid racks up a high bodycount of laughs." Metacritic, which uses a weighted average, assigned a score of 73 out of 100 based on 17 critics, indicating "generally favorable" reviews.

Reviewing the series for Chicago Sun-Times, Richard Roeper gave a rating of 3.5/5 and said, "Laid might be an acquired taste and could be accused of being less than tasteful, but it's funny as hell and even kind of sweet in its own warped way." Margaret Lyons of The New York Times described the series as "Biting in ways that feel special and gossipy, and unlike with lesser kooky mystery shows, its characters' smarts and forthrightness are what move the story forward." In a review for Variety, Alison Herman wrote that Laid's heightened premise over similar series such as Lovesick results in a "tonal hurdle the eight-episode season proves unable to surmount". Laid is "breezily casual" about Ruby's former lovers dying while not interrogating how these deaths are a result of her actions.
