= AACTA Award for Best Television Comedy Series =

Australian television award

- Country: Australia
- Presented by: Australian Academy of Cinema and Television Arts (AACTA)
- First award: 2003
- Currently held by: Shaun Micallef's Mad as Hell (2022)

Highlights
- Most awards: Review with Myles Barlow; Utopia; The Letdown
- Most nominations: Rosehaven; Shaun Micallef's Mad as Hell
- Website: www.aacta.org

The AACTA Award for Best Television Comedy Series is an Australian television award, given at the AACTA Awards (formerly AFI Awards). It has formerly been known as the AFI Award for Best Comedy Series – Sitcom or Sketch; AFI Award for Best Television Comedy Series; and AFI Award for Best Television Comedy Series.

== History ==
From 2003 to 2010, the category was presented by the Australian Film Institute (AFI), the Academy's parent organisation, at the annual Australian Film Institute Awards (known as the AFI Awards). When the AFI launched the Academy in 2011, it changed the annual ceremony to the AACTA Awards, with the current prize being a continuum of the AFI Award for Best Television Comedy Series.

The award was first handed out in 2003 it was called Best Comedy Series – Sitcom or Sketch until 2005, when it was renamed Best Television Comedy Series. In 2013, the Academy announced that because of a lack of funds, due to the loss of Samsung as a naming rights sponsor for the AACTA Awards, some categories were either merged or removed from the 2014 Awards. This included the award for Best Television Comedy Series which was merged with the Best Light Entertainment Television Series prize, under the name Best Television Comedy or Light Entertainment Series. However, AACTA announced that it will split the category, and Best Television Comedy Series will be given as a stand-alone award once again for the 2015 presentation.

== Description ==
The AACTA Award for Best Television Comedy Series is accolade given by the Australian Academy of Cinema and Television Arts (AACTA), a non-profit organisation whose aim is to "identify, award, promote and celebrate Australia's greatest achievements in film and television." The award is handed out at the annual AACTA Awards, which rewards achievements in Australian feature film, television, documentaries, and short films.

The AACTA Award for Best Television Comedy Series is given to the producer of the winning production. To be eligible for nomination, the program must be a situation comedy or sketch series, with no less than four substantially scripted episodes, no more than one hour in length. Each episode must contain either a "continuing story with an ongoing plot and characters" or "a series of unrelated sketches."

== Most awards ==
Review with Myles Barlow, Utopia, and The Letdown have earned two awards, more than any other program. Selin Yaman and John Safran are the most awarded producers with two wins, and Nicole Minchin, Adam Zwar, Robyn Butler, and Wayne Hope have received the most nominations with four each.

== Winners and nominees ==
In the following table, the years listed correspond to the year that the television programme aired on Australian television; the ceremonies are usually held the following year.^{[A]} The television series whose name is emphasised in boldface and highlighted in yellow has won the award. Those that are neither highlighted nor in bold are the nominees. When sorted chronologically, the table always lists the winning program first and then the other nominees.

Year	Program	Producer(s)	Network
**2003** (45th)
**2003** (45th)	**John Safran's Music Jamboree**	**Selin Yaman, John Safran**	**SBS**
**2003** (45th)	Big Bite	Michael Horrocks	Seven Network
**2003** (45th)	CNNNN	Andrew Denton, Mark Fennessy	ABC
**2003** (45th)	Kath & Kim	Gina Riley, Jane Turner, Mark Ruse	ABC
**2004** (46th)
**2004** (46th)	**Double the Fist**	**Megan Harding**	**ABC**
**2004** (46th)	Kath & Kim	Gina Riley, Jane Turner, Mark Ruse	ABC
**2004** (46th)	SkitHOUSE	Craig Campbell, Jodie Crawford-Fish, Rove McManus	Network Ten
**2004** (46th)	Stories from the Golf	Robyn Butler, Wayne Hope	SBS
**2005** (47th)
**2005** (47th)	**John Safran vs God**	**Selin Yaman, John Safran**	**SBS**
**2005** (47th)	Comedy Inc.-The Late Shift	David McDonald	Nine Network
**2005** (47th)	The Chaser Decides	The Chaser	ABC
**2005** (47th)	We Can Be Heroes: Finding The Australian of the Year	Laura Waters	ABC
**2006** (48th)
**2006** (48th)	**The Chaser's War on Everything**	**Mark Fitzgerald, Julian Morrow, Andy Nehl**	**ABC**
**2006** (48th)	Comedy Inc.-The Late Shift	David McDonald	Nine Network
**2006** (48th)	Supernova	David Maher, David G. Taylor, Beryl Vertue, Sue Vertue	UKTV
**2007** (49th)
**2007** (49th)	**Wilfred**	**Jenny Livingston**	**SBS**
**2007** (49th)	The Chaser's War on Everything	Andy Nehl, Julian Morrow, Jo Wathen	ABC
**2007** (49th)	The New Inventors	Anita Jorgensen, Jo Wathen	ABC1
**2007** (49th)	The Sideshow	Ted Robinson, Pam Swain, Megan Harding	ABC
**2008** (50th)
**2008** (50th)	**Summer Heights High**	**Chris Lilley, Laura Waters**	**ABC**
**2008** (50th)	Chandon Pictures	Rob Carlton	Movie Extra
**2008** (50th)	The Hollowmen	Santo Cilauro, Tom Gleisner, Rob Sitch	ABC1
**2008** (50th)	The Librarians	Robyn Butler, Wayne Hope	ABC
**2009** (51st)
**2009** (51st)	**Review with Myles Barlow**	**Dean Bates**	**ABC2**
**2009** (51st)	Chandon Pictures	Rob Carlton	Movie Extra
**2009** (51st)	Lawrence Leung's Choose Your Own Adventure	Nathan Earl, Andy Nehl	ABC1
**2009** (51st)	Very Small Business	Robyn Butler, Wayne Hope	ABC1
**2010** (52nd)
**2010** (52nd)	**Review with Myles Barlow** (series 2)	**Dean Bates**	**ABC2**
**2010** (52nd)	Lowdown	Nicole Minchin, Amanda Brotchie, Adam Zwar	ABC1
**2010** (52nd)	Wilfred (series 2)	Jenny Livingston, Tony Rogers, Adam Zwar, Jason Gann	SBS
**AACTA Awards**
**2011** (1st)
**2011** (1st)	**Laid**	**Liz Watts**	**ABC1**
**2011** (1st)	At Home With Julia	Rick Kalowski, Greg Quail and Carol Hughes	ABC1
**2011** (1st)	Twentysomething	Nicole Minchin	ABC2
**2012** (2nd)
**2012** (2nd)	**Lowdown** (series 2)	**Nicole Minchin, Amanda Brotchie and Adam Zwar**	**ABC1**
**2012** (2nd)	A Moody Christmas	Andrew Walker	ABC1
**2012** (2nd)	Danger 5	Kate Croser and Dario Russo	SBS One
**2012** (2nd)	Shaun Micallef's Mad as Hell	Peter Beck	ABC1
**2013** (3rd)
**2013** (3rd)	**Please Like Me**	**Todd Abbott**	**ABC2**
**2013** (3rd)	The Agony of Life	Nicole Minchin, Amanda Brotchie and Adam Zwar	ABC1
**2013** (3rd)	Gruen Nation (series 2)	Sophia Zachariou, Jo Wathen, Wil Anderson and Jon Casimir	ABC1
**2013** (3rd)	Shaun Micallef's Mad as Hell	Peter Beck and Shaun Micallef	ABC1
**2013** (3rd)	Upper Middle Bogan	Robyn Butler and Wayne Hope	ABC1
**2014** (4th)
**2014** (4th)	**Utopia**	**Santo Cilauro, Tom Gleisner, Michael Hirsh, and Rob Sitch**	**ABC**
**2014** (4th)	It's a Date	Laura Waters, Andrea Denholm, Paul Walton, and Peter Helliar	ABC
**2014** (4th)	The Moodys	Chloe Rickard and Jason Burrows	ABC
**2014** (4th)	Please Like Me	Todd Abbott, Josh Thomas, and Kevin Whyte	ABC
**2014** (4th)	Shaun Micallef's Mad as Hell	Peter Beck and Shaun Micallef	ABC
**2015** (5th)
**2015** (5th)	**Shaun Micallef's Mad as Hell**	**Peter Beck and Shaun Micallef**	ABC
**2015** (5th)	Danger 5 (Series 2)	Kate Croser and Dario Russo	SBS
**2015** (5th)	Sammy J & Randy in Ricketts Lane	Donna Andrews and Stu Connolly	ABC
**2015** (5th)	Utopia	Michael Hirsh, Santo Cilauro, Tom Gleisner and Rob Sitch	ABC
**2016** (6th)
**2016** (6th)	**Upper Middle Bogan**	**Robyn Butler, Wayne Hope, Ben Grogan**	**ABC**
**2016** (6th)	Black Comedy	Kath Shelper, Mark O'Toole	ABC
**2016** (6th)	The Family Law	Sophie Miller, Julie Eckersley, Debbie Lee, Tony Ayres	SBS
**2016** (6th)	Please Like Me	Todd Abbott, Josh Thomas, Lisa Wang, Kevin Whyte	ABC
**2017** (7th)
**2017** (7th)	**Utopia**	Michael Hirsh, Santo Cilauro, Tom Gleisner and Rob Sitch	ABC
**2017** (7th)	No Activity	Chloe Rickard	Stan
**2017** (7th)	Rosehaven	Andrew Walker, Kevin Whyte, Celia Pacquola, Luke McGregor	ABC
**2017** (7th)	True Story with Hamish & Andy	Tim Bartley, Andy Lee, Ryan Shelton, Andrew Walker	Nine Network
**2018** (8th)
**2018** (8th)	**The Letdown**	**Julian Morrow, Sarah Scheller, Alison Bell**	**ABC**
**2018** (8th)	Black Comedy	Kath Shelper, Mark O'Toole	ABC
**2018** (8th)	Nanette	Kevin Whyte, Kathleen McCarthy, Frank Bruzzese	Netflix
**2018** (8th)	Rosehaven	Andrew Walker, Kevin Whyte, Celia Pacquola, Luke McGregor	ABC
**2018** (8th)	True Story with Hamish & Andy	Tim Bartley, Andy Lee, Ryan Shelton, Andrew Walker	Nine Network
**2019** (9th)
**2019** (9th)	**The Letdown**	**Julian Morrow, Sarah Scheller, Alison Bell**	**ABC**
**2019** (9th)	Rosehaven	Andrew Walker, Kevin Whyte, Celia Pacquola, Luke McGregor	ABC
**2019** (9th)	Frayed	Clelia Mountford, Sharon Horgan, Nicole O'Donohue, Kevin Whyte	ABC
**2019** (9th)	Sammy J	Sammy J, Michelle Buxton, Chris McDonald	ABC
**2019** (9th)	Utopia	Michael Hirsh, Santo Cilauro, Tom Gleisner and Rob Sitch	ABC
**2020** (10th)
**2020** (10th)	**Upright**	**Jason Stephens, Helen Bowden, Melissa Kelly, Chris Taylor, Tim Minchin**	**Foxtel**
**2020** (10th)	At Home Alone Together	Nick Hayden, Janet Gaeta, Nikita Agzarian, Dan Ilic	ABC
**2020** (10th)	Black Comedy	Kath Shelper, Mark O'Toole, Nakkiah Lui, David Woodhead	ABC
**2020** (10th)	The Other Guy	Angie Fielder, Polly Staniford, Jude Troy, Alice Willison	Stan
**2020** (10th)	Rosehaven	Andrew Walker, Kevin Whyte, Celia Pacquola, Luke McGregor	ABC
**2021** (11th)
**2021** (11th)	**Fisk**	**Vincent Sheehan**	**ABC**
**2021** (11th)	Aftertaste	Rebecca Summerton, Erik Thomson, Matthew Bate, Julie De Fina	ABC
**2021** (11th)	Aunty Donna's Big Ol' House of Fun	Sam Lingham, Katherine Dale	Netflix
**2021** (11th)	Frayed	Clelia Mountford, Sharon Horgan, Kevin Whyte, Nicole O'Donohue	ABC
**2021** (11th)	Preppers	Liz Watts, Sylvia Warme	ABC
**2021** (11th)	Rosehaven	Andrew Walker, Celia Pacquola, Luke McGregor, Kevin Whyte	ABC
**2022** (12th)
**2022** (12th)	**Shaun Micallef's Mad as Hell**	**Peter Beck, Beth Hart, Shaun Micallef**	**ABC**
**2022** (12th)	Aftertaste	Rebecca Summerton, Matthew Bate, Erik Thomson, Julie De Fina	ABC
**2022** (12th)	Five Bedrooms	Christine Bartlett, Michael Lucas, Nathan Mayfield, Tracey Robertson	Network Ten
**2022** (12th)	Hard Quiz	Chris Walker, Kevin Whyte, Tom Gleeson, John Tabbagh	ABC
**2022** (12th)	Spicks and Specks	Rachel Millar, Anthony Watt	ABC
**2022** (12th)	Summer Love	Wayne Hope, Robyn Butler	ABC
**2023** (13th)
**2023** (13th)	**Colin from Accounts**	**Ian Collie, Rob Gibson, Patrick Brammall, Harriet Dyer**	**Binge, Foxtel**
**2023** (13th)	Deadloch	Kate McCartney, Kate McLennan, Andrew Walker, Kevin Whyte
**2023** (13th)	Fisk	Vincent Sheehan, Kitty Flanagan	ABC
**2023** (13th)	Gold Diggers	Ujuk Linda, John-Paul Sarni, Muffy Potter, Kate Butler	ABC
**2023** (13th)	Upright	Jason Stephens, Meg O'Connell, Tim Minchin, Helen Bowden	Foxtel
**2023** (13th)	Utopia	Michael Hirsh, Deb Herman	ABC
**2024** (14th)
**2024** (14th)	**Fisk**	**Nicole Minchin, Kitty Flanagan, producer, Tom Peterson**	**ABC**
**2024** (14th)	Austin	Catherine Nebauer, Joe Weatherstone, Darren Ashton, Ben Miller	ABC
**2024** (14th)	Bump	Dan Edwards, John Edwards, Claudia Karvan, Kelsey Munro	Stan
**2024** (14th)	Colin from Accounts	Kevin Greene, Ian Collie, Rob Gibson	**Binge, Foxtel**
**2024** (14th)	Strife	Steve Hutensky, Jodi Matterson, Asher Keddie, Mia Freedman, Sarah Scheller, Lorelle Adamson	**Binge, Foxtel**
**2024** (14th)	The Office	Sophia Zachariou, Kylie Washington, Linda Micsko	Amazon Prime Video

== See also ==
- AACTA Awards
