= The Kettering Incident =

Australian TV series

- Genre: Thriller
- Created by: Victoria Madden; Vincent Sheehan
- Written by: Victoria Madden; Louise Fox; Cate Shortland; Andrew Knight
- Directed by: Rowan Woods; Tony Krawitz
- Starring: Elizabeth Debicki; Matthew Le Nevez; Henry Nixon; Anthony Phelan; Damon Gameau; Damien Garvey; Sacha Horler; Brad Kannegiesser; Sianoa Smit-McPhee
- Country of origin: Australia
- Original language: English
- No. of series: 1
- No. of episodes: 8

Production
- Executive producers: Penny Win; Liz Watts
- Producers: Vincent Sheehan; Andrew Walker
- Running time: 60 minutes

Original release
- Network: Showcase
- Release: 4 July – 15 August 2016

The Kettering Incident is an Australian television sci-fi drama program, first broadcast on Foxtel's Showcase channel on 4 July 2016. Starring Elizabeth Debicki and Matthew Le Nevez, the series was created by Victoria Madden and Vincent Sheehan, and filmed in and around the town of Kettering and Bruny Island in Tasmania. The series won several awards, including the AACTA Award for Best Telefeature or Mini Series.

== Synopsis ==
Anna Macy left Kettering when she was just fourteen, shortly after her best friend (and paternal half-sister), Gillian Baxter, mysteriously disappeared. The two girls had been cycling through the forbidden forests outside Kettering when they saw strange lights in the sky. Eight hours later, Anna was found alone, terrified and covered in blood.

Fifteen years later, Anna returns to find the town struggling to survive. The forests have been marked for logging and the town is on edge following violent clashes between environmentalists and the local loggers. Anna's reappearance causes a stir when another local girl, Chloe Holloway (Sianoa Smit-McPhee), disappears, prompting Anna to discover what really happened the night Gillian disappeared, uncovering secrets that threaten the future of Kettering.

== Cast ==
=== Main cast ===
- Elizabeth Debicki as Anna Macy
- Matthew Le Nevez as Detective Brian Dutch
- Henry Nixon as Officer Fergus McFadden
- Anthony Phelan as Roy Macy
- Damon Gameau as Jens Jorgenssen
- Damien Garvey as Max Holloway
- Sacha Horler as Barbara Holloway
- Brad Kannegiesser as Adam Holloway
- Sianoa Smit-McPhee as Chloe Holloway

=== Supporting cast ===
- Suzi Dougherty as Renae Baxter
- Kevin MacIsaac as Travis Kingston
- Alison Whyte as Deb Russell
- Tilda Cobham-Hervey as Eliza Grayson
- Dylan Young as Dane Sullivan
- Neil Pigot as Dominic Harold
- Nathan Spencer as Lewis Sullivan
- Marcus Hensley as Mick MacDonald
- Matthew Burton as Singlet Russell
- Miranda Bennett as Gillian Baxter
- Ben Oxenbould as Craig Grayson
- Katie Robertson as Sandra Hull
- Maddison Brown as Anna Macy when young
- Kris McQuade as Fiona McKenzie
- Thomas Readman as Kade Fisher
- Maya Jean as Matilda Russell
- Anna McGahan as Gillian Baxter / Dr Colleen McKay

== Episodes ==
No.	Title	Directed by	Written by	Original release date	Australian viewers
1	"Anna"	Rowan Woods	Victoria Madden	4 July 2016	115,000
Consultant Anna Macy (Elizabeth Debicki), who is working at a city hospital in London, decides to head home to her native Tasmania after suffering from a series of unexplained blackouts, which she suspects are the result of a childhood trauma in which her best friend, Gillian, disappeared one night whilst biking in the forests outside Kettering. Upon her return, she is greeted with distrust from many of the locals who still believe that she killed Gillian and buried her body. As Anna is gradually drawn back into the haunting past of Kettering, she reunites with former flame Fergus McFadden (Henry Nixon) and forms a close friendship with student Chloe Holloway (Sianoa Smit-McPhee). But when Chloe later disappears in similar circumstances to Gillian, Anna soon begins to realise that the terrible events of her past are about to catch up with her.
2	"The Lights"	Rowan Woods	Victoria Madden	4 July 2016	115,000
Chloe's parents start to panic when she fails to return home, and when they discover that she was in Anna's company at the forest party the previous night, alarm bells start to ring. Fergus (Henry Nixon) finds part of an old sailing vessel that disappeared ten years ago with his father on board. Max (Damien Garvey) continues to negotiate contract rights for the next part of his logging project, but continues to face stiff opposition. Dane is confronted by his supplier when a drugs shipment fails to reach its intended buyer. Anna's erratic behaviour continues as she trashes a local pharmacy and steals a medical prescription pad belonging to her former doctor, Fiona McKenzie (Kris McQuade). When Eliza (Tilda Cobham-Hervey) receives a voicemail from a clearly distressed and frightened Chloe, her parents begin to suspect that history may be repeating itself.
3	"The Search"	Tony Krawitz	Cate Shortland	11 July 2016	106,000
As the search for Chloe gets underway, many of the locals voice concern over Anna's offer to help. Dane comes under further scrutiny from Dutch and finally reveals the location of the missing drugs. Fergus struggles to adapt to taking control of his first major investigation since Roy's retirement. Anna discovers that Deb (Alison Whyte) is suffering from cancer, and pays a visit to McKenzie in the hope of discovering a link between the incidents in the forest and the high number of local diagnoses of various forms of the disease. Ranae (Suzi Dougherty) finds herself on the end of a beating from Travis (Kevin MacIsaac) after the pressure of Chloe's disappearance begins to reopen old wounds. As light breaks, the second day of the search begins, but it's not long before Max's own workers find Chloe's decomposing body in the grounds of the mill.
4	"The Mill"	Tony Krawitz	Louise Fox	18 July 2016	119,000
Chloe's post mortem reveals that she died as a result of blunt force trauma to the skull. Anna is interviewed, and under scrutiny from Dutch, provides an alternate account to the one she gave Fergus on the day of Chloe's disappearance. Dutch fakes an alibi for Dane, but Dane's interview with Fergus only arouses his suspicions as to his governor's involvement. Max reveals that he had been receiving a series of blackmail letters in the months leading up to Chloe's death, warning him that his actions will result in tragedy for his family. Anna finds a photo in Fergus' case file of marks on Chloe's body which are identical to those of a young boy she met several days previously at the medical centre. Adam is involved in a serious accident whilst out driving in the forest, leading Anna to suspect that something dangerous is being hidden up at Mother Sullivan's Ridge.
5	"The Forest"	Rowan Woods	Andrew Knight	25 July 2016	115,000
Eliza accuses Travis of rape and, as news of his indiscretion sweeps through Kettering, a group of protesters decide to teach him a lesson by chaining him up deep in the forest. Anna's attempts to identify the young boy's condition are halted when forensic tests reveal a blood sample taken from him contains a molecular structure previously undiscovered in humans. A party in Roy's honour is held at the local social club, but his mood for celebration is interrupted by a stern warning from Dutch. Anna discovers a case file in Roy's possessions which claims that she was held in an asylum for ten days after Gillian's disappearance, and that Lofty's arrest was part of a cover-up to ensure that the truth about what happened that night was kept secret. Fergus continues to secretly investigate Dutch and warns Roy that he intends to expose his corruption.
6	"Roy"	Rowan Woods	Victoria Madden	1 August 2016	149,000
Whilst investigating Mother Sullivan's Ridge, Anna stumbles across a possible crime scene in the old Sullivan house and alerts Fergus. Chloe's missing pickup is found nearby in a recently dry dam, but suspicions are aroused when evidence found inside the vehicle, suggesting she was working against her own father by leaking confidential information to protesters, is found to be bone dry, suggesting the vehicle has only recently been dumped. Fergus decides to take his concerns about Dutch to the assistant commissioner, but his suspicions are rebuffed when the commissioner claims that Dutch has been privately reporting the progress of the investigation directly to his superiors. Lofty is arrested after blood is found in the back of his pickup. Anna's mother takes a turn for the worse, and Anna is shocked to discover that her blood type, previously O, has changed to AB+.
7	"The Madness"	Tony Krawitz	Victoria Madden	8 August 2016	133,000
Mother Sullivan's Ridge is put into quarantine when it is discovered that toxic waste has contaminated the town's water supply. Max is forced to inform his workers that the mill has been sold and that they will be made redundant from the end of the month. Fergus continues to interrogate Dutch about the drugs operation. Forensic analysis of Chloe's belt reveals a partial fingerprint belonging to an Antarctic scientist, David Owen, who has been missing since 1998. Anna speaks to one of his colleagues, who has pitched up in Kettering after tracking a signal first discovered in Antarctica shortly before Owen's disappearance. Dutch finds a bloodied weapon in the boot of Anna's car, and later witnesses Max and Craig burying Travis's decomposing body out in the forest. Paint samples found near the scene of Chloe's murder are discovered to match a car belonging to Travis.
8	"The Homecoming"	Tony Krawitz	Victoria Madden	15 August 2016	151,000
Roy and Fiona are forced to admit Anna after she begins to show signs of blood transformation. Fergus discovers that Roy was bribed to dump toxic waste up on Mother Sullivan's Ridge by a biotech company trading as Amber Arrow. After discovering that Amber Arrow are also responsible for the recent purchase of the mill, Anna manages to break free from the hospital and tracks them down to a deserted warehouse on the edge of Kettering, where she manages to confirm her suspicions that Jens is none other than David Owen. As she comes face to face with the truth of what happened on the night of Gillian's disappearance, she discovers a life-changing secret buried beneath Mother Sullivan's Ridge. Renae mysteriously disappears, and Dutch and Fergus find a note which supposedly confirms that she was responsible for Chloe's murder.

== Production ==
The Kettering Incident was created by Victoria Madden and Vincent Sheehan, and was written by Victoria Madden, Louise Fox, Cate Shortland, and Andrew Knight. A sneak preview of the series launched at the 2015 Dark MoFo festival, with two episodes shown to select audiences at nine locations around Tasmania.

The series was filmed in and around the town of Kettering and Bruny Island in Tasmania, as announced in February 2014 by the then Premier of Tasmania, Lara Giddings, during a press conference in Kettering. The series was funded by Screen Australia, Screen Tasmania, Foxtel and BBC Worldwide, and was developed with the assistance of British broadcaster Channel 4. The series was executive produced by Penny Win and Liz Watts.

The series was budgeted at A$15 million, and was promoted as the first adult drama filmed in Tasmania. The series was directed by Rowan Woods and Tony Krawitz.

A second series was in development in May 2017 but series creator Victoria Madden confirmed in June 2018 that it was ultimately not picked up by Foxtel.

== Broadcast ==
The Kettering Incident premiered on Foxtel's Showcase channel on 4 July 2016.

== Reception ==
=== Critical reception ===
The Kettering Incident garnered mixed reviews, with a score of 67% on review aggregator Rotten Tomatoes.

Clem Bastow, writing in The Guardian in June 2016, called the series a "Tasmanian gothic thriller par excellence", awarding it 4 out of 5 stars, while Chitra Ramaswamy, writing in The Guardian in February 2017 (after the show's release to Sky Atlantic), wrote that that there was "more than a touch of David Lynch to this Australian take on Scandi-noir"

The Irish Times reviewer Peter Crawley, referring to the series as a "widely applauded Australian drama" was withholding his opinion after viewing the first episode, writing "The Kettering Incident is so far shy to define itself, trailing the scent of a supernatural, political, sci-fi or detective drama. The real mystery is how many genres a single show can keep in play, before a globetrotting audience decides it would rather escape elsewhere". Rachel Cooke, writing in the New Statesman, called it a "ponderous, derivative show", which sacrifices character for plot.

SciFiNow, reviewing the DVD release, gave it 3 out of 5 stars.

=== Ratings ===
The series debuted to 115,000 viewers across its two episode premiere, making it the most watched non-sport title on the Foxtel platform. The figure does not include replays, streams or timeshift viewers.

No.	Title	Air date	Overnight ratings		Ref(s)
No.	Title	Air date	Viewers	Rank	Ref(s)
1	Anna	4 July 2016	115,000	1	
2	The Lights	4 July 2016	115,000	1	
3	The Search	11 July 2016	106,000	4	
4	The Mill	18 July 2016	119,000	3	
5	The Forest	25 July 2016	115,000	3	
6	Roy	1 August 2016	149,000	3	
7	The Madness	8 August 2016	133,000	2	
8	The Homecoming	15 August 2016	151,000	3	

== Accolades ==
Year	Award	Category	Recipients and nominees	Result
2015	AWGIE Awards	Television Original Miniseries	Vicki Madden, Andrew Knight, Cate Shortland and Louise Fox	Nominated
2016	AACTA Awards	Best Cinematography in Television	Ari Wegner for "The Search"	Nominated
2016	AACTA Awards	Best Direction in a Television Drama or Comedy	Rowan Woods for "Anna"	Nominated
2016	AACTA Awards	Best Guest or Supporting Actress in a Television Drama	Sacha Horler	Nominated
2016	AACTA Awards	Best Guest or Supporting Actress in a Television Drama	Sianoa Smit-McPhee	Nominated
2016	AACTA Awards	Best Lead Actress in a Television Drama	Elizabeth Debicki	Won
2016	AACTA Awards	Best Original Music Score in Television	Matteo Zingales and Max Lyandvert for "Anna"	Won
2016	AACTA Awards	Best Screenplay in Television	Victoria Madden for "Anna"	Nominated
2016	AACTA Awards	Best Telefeature or Mini Series	Vincent Sheehan, Victoria Madden, Andrew Walker	Won
2016	Series Mania Festival	Special Jury Prize	The Kettering Incident	Won

== See also ==
- Tasmanian Gothic
