= Swinburne Senior Secondary College =

College in Melbourne, Australia

- Type: Government senior secondary
- Established: 1913
- Affiliations: Swinburne University of Technology
- Principal: Daryl Bennett
- Location: Melbourne, Victoria, Australia
- Website: www.sssc.vic.edu.au

Swinburne Senior Secondary College is a co-educational government secondary college located at 505 Burwood Road, Hawthorn Victoria 3122 which caters for Years 11 and 12 students. The College offers Victorian Certificate of Education (VCE), Vocational Education and Training (VET) and Victorian Certificate of Education Vocational Major (VCEVM).

== History ==
The college was founded in 1913. Daryl Bennett became the principal in July 2021.

== Notable former students ==
- Marieke Hardy – writer, broadcaster, television producer and actress
- Georgia Maq – lead singer of Camp Cope
- Daniel Pollock – film actor, best known for his role as Davey in the 1992 Australian film Romper Stomper.
- Jane Gazzo - radio and TV presenter
- Rowland S. Howard - guitarist and songwriter known for his work in the band The Birthday Party (band)
- Robert DiPierdomenico - AFL player

== See also ==
- List of schools in Victoria
- Victorian Certificate of Education
