= Little Fish (2005 film) =

2005 Australian film by Rowan Woods

- Theatrical poster
- Directed by: Rowan Woods
- Written by: Jacquelin Perske
- Produced by: Vincent Sheehan; Liz Watts; Richard Keddie
- Starring: Cate Blanchett; Sam Neill; Hugo Weaving
- Edited by: Alexandre de Franceschi; John Scott
- Distributed by: Icon Film Distribution
- Release date: 8 September 2005 (Australia)
- Running time: 114 minutes
- Country: Australia
- Languages: English; Vietnamese
- Box office: $3.2 million

Little Fish is a 2005 Australian crime drama film directed by Rowan Woods and written by Jacquelin Perske. Starring Cate Blanchett, Hugo Weaving, and Sam Neill, the film is about a heroin addict who is desperately trying to escape her past to achieve her goals. It was developed and produced by Vincent Sheehan and Liz Watts of Porchlight Films. Little Fish was released on 8 September 2005 in Australia, earning positive reviews from critics. It was nominated for 13 AACTA Awards, winning in five categories.

== Plot ==
Little Fish is about Tracy Heart, a former heroin addict who is desperately trying to escape her past and achieve her goals and dreams. Tracy lives with her mother and brother Ray in the suburb of Cabramatta, Sydney, where heroin is readily available.

She is in need of money to become a partner in the video store that she works in, but her loan applications are repeatedly rejected by finance providers, as a result of her past criminal record, poor repayments of credit card debt, history of drug use and lack of collateral. Tracy lies to both her mother and her boss at the video store, pretending she has received the loan. The casual ways people lie to each other for convenience is one of the recurring themes of the movie.

Tracy is trying to help her drug addicted stepfather and former National Rugby League star Lionel Dawson to kick his heroin addiction. After a four-year absence in Vancouver, her former boyfriend Jonny Nguyen, also a former heroin addict, has come back into her life. Jonny, who now dresses in business suits, claims to have employment as a stockbroker at a large firm and suggests he may be able to obtain the money Tracy desires through share trading. The romance between Tracy and Jonny is rekindled.

Upon visiting Jonny's alleged workplace, Tracy discovers Jonny has lied to her and is not in fact employed as a stockbroker. Jonny has become involved in a drug deal with her brother Ray, and Tracy also chooses to become involved in the deal as she sees this as the only means of providing the finance she needs to become a partner in the video store.

Tracy, Ray, and Jonny set out to execute the deal, which ends in tragedy. Tracy's courage and deep love for those she cares about are notable in the climactic scenes of the film.

== Cast ==
- Cate Blanchett as Tracy Louise Heart
- Hugo Weaving as Lionel Dawson
- Sam Neill as Brad 'The Jockey' Thompson
- Martin Henderson as Ray Heart
- Noni Hazlehurst as Janelle Heart
- Dustin Nguyen as Jonny Nguyen
- Joel Tobeck as Steven Moss
- Lisa McCune as Laura
- Susie Porter as Jenny Moss
- Anh Do as Tran
- Daniela Farinacci as Donna
- Frannie Cutrupi as the Local Girl
- Nina Liu as Mai
- Jon Sivewright as Footy Fan

== Production ==
=== Development ===
The film, a crime drama, is directed by Rowan Woods and written by Jacquelin Perske. It was developed and produced by Vincent Sheehan and Liz Watts of Porchlight Films, with Cate Blanchett and her husband Andrew Upton's production company Dirty Films receiving an associate producer credit.

=== Soundtrack ===
Cover versions of the Cold Chisel song "Flame Trees" appear more than once during the film and on the soundtrack. One version is sung by The Sacred Heart School Choir from Cabramatta, New South Wales, the other by singer Sarah Blasko. The soundtrack also features original songs composed by Nathan Larson. The track listing comprises:

1. "Flame Trees" - Sarah Blasko
2. "Little Fish Theme"
3. "A Place in the Sun" - Hoodoo Gurus
4. "Pool Love"
5. "Con Mua Ha" - Mylinh Dinh
6. "Half Speed Love"
7. "Something's Gotten Hold of My Heart" - Bic Runga
8. "I Can't Score For You"
9. "Flame Trees" - The Sacred Heart School, Cabramatta
10. "Little Fish Theme" (Redux)
11. "Ban Toi" - The Enterprise Band featuring Hoang Son
12. "Lionel Requiem"
13. "End Credits"
14. "Tinh Xot Xa Thoi".... Hong Anh Singer ( Le Quang)

== Release ==
Little Fish was released on 8 September 2005 in Australian cinemas. Distribution was handled by Icon Film Distribution.

Little Fish was released on DVD a part of the Dendy Collection by Icon Entertainment. A Blu-ray edition was released in August 2010.

== Reception ==
Little Fish received positive reviews from critics. The film has a 90% approval rating on review aggregator website Rotten Tomatoes based on 29 reviews, with an average rating of 6.7/10. Metacritic assigned the film a weighted average score of 77 (out of 100), based on 9 critics, indicating "generally favorable reviews".

Critics admired the film for its screenplay and the actors' performances. The critic Liz Braun said "Little Fish has beautifully understated performances and a script that emphasizes the mundane and the manipulative in the addict's world." Owen Gleiberman from Entertainment Weekly praised it mostly for its acting performances, saying "The actors are terrific, especially Weaving, who plays bottoming out as a tragedy spiked with gallows humor, and Blanchett, who digs deep into the booby-trapped nature of recovery. The revelation, however, is Rowan Woods, a major filmmaker in the making."

== Accolades ==
The film was nominated for 13 AACTA Awards in 2005, and won five including Best Actor (Hugo Weaving), Best Actress (Cate Blanchett), Best Supporting Actress (Noni Hazlehurst), and Best Editing. It also won several Inside Film Awards, including Best Actress and Best Actor. Jacquelin Perske's screenplay won the Film Script category at the 2005 Queensland Premier's Literary Awards.

At the ARIA Music Awards of 2006 the soundtrack was nominated for ARIA Award for Best Original Soundtrack, Cast or Show Album.
