= Liz Watts =

Australian film producer

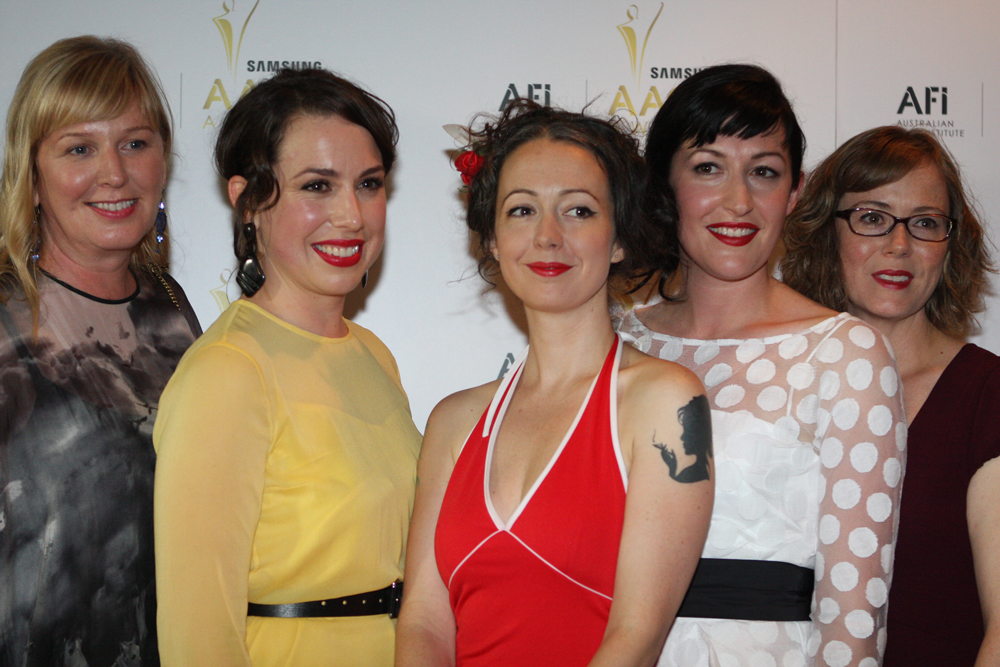
Left to right: Liz Watts, Alison Bell, Marieke Hardy, Celia Pacquola and Kirsty Fisher at AACTA Awards 2012

Liz Watts is an Australian film producer. She is best known for the 2010 drama film Animal Kingdom, and was a founding partner of Porchlight Films (1997–2020). After developing some projects through her own company, Spirit Pictures, she was appointed head of film and television (Australia) at See Saw Films in December 2021.

== Career ==
=== Films ===
Liz Watts began her career working in the camera department, before branching into developing films. She was appointed to various roles at Film Australia, Beyond, and Southern Star, first working on managing the production of short films.

In 2010, she produced David Michôd's directorial feature debut, Animal Kingdom, which won widespread critical acclaim. It was nominated in 18 categories in the 2010 Australian Film Institute Awards, winning 10 of them.

Watts collaborated with See-Saw Films on the 2018 film Mary Magdalene starring Rooney Mara, among other projects. She co-produced the 2019 film directed by David Michôd for Netflix, The King. She also co-produced Justin Kurzel's True History of the Kelly Gang, also released in 2019, with Kurzel and others.

In 2021 Watts struck an overall first-look deal with Matchbox Pictures, which is part of Universal International Studios.

=== Production companies ===
In 1997, with producer Vincent Sheehan and Anita Sheehan, and she formed Porchlight Films. The company ceased operations on 20 June 2020, and Watts subsequently formed her own company, Spirit Pictures.

In December 2021, Watts was appointed head of film and television, Australia, at See Saw Films, effective 14 December. In this role, she oversees the development and production of all film and television projects out of the company's Australian office in Sydney. She also brought selected projects from her previous company, Spirit Pictures, and continued to executive produce various projects developed under the deal with Matchbox Pictures. As of January 2026, Watts still holds this position.

== Other activities ==
Watts has served on the boards of the Sydney Film Festival (five years); for 5 years Metro Screen (six years, as vice-president), and the South Australian Film Corporation.

She gave a masterclass in film production at the 2015 Big Screen Symposium.

In October 2025, Watts was a panel member of a discussion titled "What Is An Australian Story?" at SXSW Sydney.

== Recognition ==
- 2010: Churchill Fellowship, "to explore innovative production, distribution practices and content creation within independent American cinema in the USA and UK"
- 2012: Listed in Harper's Bazaar "Top 25 Women in Australian Film"
- 2013: Patron of The World of Women (WOW) Film Festival

== Selected filmography ==
- Martha's New Coat (2003)
- Jewboy (2005)
- Little Fish (2005)
- The Home Song Stories (2007)
- Animal Kingdom (2010)
- Laid (2011–12) (TV series)
- Lore (2012)
- Dead Europe (2012)
- The Rover (2014)
- Jasper Jones (2017)
- Mary Magdalene (2018)
- The King (2019)
- True History of the Kelly Gang (2019)
- The Royal Hotel (2023)
- Tenzing (2026)
- Wizards! (TBA)
