= Laid (Australian TV series) =

Australian comedy television series

- Promotional poster for the series
- Genre: Black comedy Drama
- Created by: Marieke Hardy; Kirsty Fisher
- Directed by: Trent O'Donnell; Abe Forsythe
- Starring: Alison Bell; Celia Pacquola; Abe Forsythe; Toby Truslove; Damon Herriman
- Opening theme: "My Girl's Pussy" by R. Crumb & His Cheap Suit Serenaders
- Country of origin: Australia
- Original language: English
- No. of seasons: 2
- No. of episodes: 12

Production
- Executive producers: Debbie Lee; Vincent Sheehan
- Producer: Liz Watts
- Running time: 26–30 minutes

Original release
- Network: ABC Television
- Release: 9 February 2011 – 6 June 2012

Laid is an Australian television comedy series that first aired on 9 February 2011 on ABC1. The 12-episode comedy series was written by Marieke Hardy and Kirsty Fisher, and produced by Liz Watts. Laid was renewed for a second series, which aired from 2 May to 6 June 2012.

== Premise ==
Roo McVie is a market researcher who faces an unenviable situation when her former lovers start dying in strange and unexpected circumstances. With EJ, her best friend and flatmate, Roo embarks on a quest to find a pattern and stop the trail of deaths.

== Cast ==
=== Regular ===
- Alison Bell as Roo McVie
- Celia Pacquola as EJ Griggs
- Toby Truslove as Zach
- Abe Forsythe as Charlie
- Graeme Blundell as Graham McVie
- Damon Herriman as Marcus Dwyer (season 2)

=== Recurring ===
- Tracy Mann as Marion McVie
- Huw McKinnon as Brendan
- Celia Ireland as Brendan's Mum
- Peter Callan as Brendan's Dad
- Justin Rosniak as Johnny
- Ryan Johnson as Davey
- Septimus Caton as Andrew
- Shaun Micallef as G-Bomb
- Craig Anderson as Russ
- Marcus Graham as Telly
- Judi Farr as Nan
- Deborah Kennedy as Jan Beane
- Neil Pigot as Hilary
- Bob Baines as Andrew's Dad

=== Guests ===
- Steve Le Marquand as Zalan
- John Batchelor as Boss
- Syd Brisbane as Peter
- Wendy Playfair as Old Lady

== Episodes ==
=== Season 1 (2011) ===
No. overall	No. in series	Title	Directed by	Written by	Original release date
1	1	"Episode 1"	Trent O'Donnell	Marieke Hardy	9 February 2011
Roo McVie is a market researcher who likes to have a good time. After attending former lover Brendan Atherton's funeral, she faces an unenviable situation when more of her former lovers start dying in strange and unexpected circumstances. She embarks on a quest to find a pattern and stop the litany of deaths with EJ, her best friend and flatmate.
2	2	"Episode 2"	Trent O'Donnell	Marieke Hardy	16 February 2011
It's a triple whammy for Roo when she sleeps with Zach post yet another break up with EJ, finds out that Charlie has a girlfriend and learns her past big love, Andrew, is dying.
3	3	"Episode 3"	Trent O'Donnell	Kirsty Fisher	23 February 2011
Charlie asks Roo to fill in on his indoor cricket team. Telly, a man who Roo had a drunken night with, plays for a rival team. Telly is hit in the head by a cricket ball and killed. Meanwhile, EJ has prepared a photo-board of Roo's exes. Roo tries to track down Russell Black, the next ex on her list, and tries to protect him. But he falls off a cliff and is rushed to the hospital. While Roo is in the waiting room, EJ calls to tell Roo the ex after Russ has died, which leaves her confused. A confession from Russ clears up why he didn't die – Russ didn't go all the way with Roo.
4	4	"Episode 4"	Trent O'Donnell	Marieke Hardy	2 March 2011
Roo visits a suburban shaman who uses a hot tub to attempt to remove her curse. Zach finds the photo-board and works out that all the exes, including him, are slated for death. He decides to warn all Roo's former lovers and calls them to a meeting at a pub, where they all, except for him, die from food poisoning.
5	5	"Episode 5"	Trent O'Donnell	Marieke Hardy	9 March 2011
Roo has moved out of the flat and EJ is not speaking to her, after EJ found out that Roo slept with Zach at the end of the previous episode.
6	6	"Episode 6"	Trent O'Donnell	Marieke Hardy	16 March 2011
Zach holds his own wake and then decides to tick off his bucket list and while swimming in a shark tank chokes on a fish and is declared dead – only to revive, possibly dodging his fate. Charlie takes Roo to meet his mother, a spiritualist, who tells Roo she has to make peace with her dead lovers. After a ceremony doing this, Charlie believes the curse is lifted and they sleep together – the next day he doesn't wake up.

=== Season 2 (2012) ===
No. overall	No. in series	Title	Directed by	Written by	Original release date
7	1	"Episode 1"	Abe Forsythe	Marieke Hardy & Kirsty Fisher	2 May 2012
Charlie is in a coma. G-Bomb recommends Roo see Marcus Dwyer, the "opposite" of Roo – any woman he has sex with is cured of her ailment. Charlie wakes from coma, but seems about to succumb to the curse, so Roo tries to get him to have sex with Marcus, but both refuse.
8	2	"Episode 2"	Abe Forsythe	Marieke Hardy & Kirsty Fisher	9 May 2012
Charlie's mother Jan has sex with Marcus while EJ takes notes. Roo decides to have sex with Marcus to remove her curse, but he refuses, fearing he will lose his power. Zach believes he is the Second Coming of Christ, and tries to perform miracles, with little success.
9	3	"Episode 3"	Abe Forsythe	Marieke Hardy	16 May 2012
Zach and his friend decide to spend the day with Marcus. Charlie recovers, then has a relapse after sleeping with Roo. Desperate, she decides to drug Marcus and rape him, but is unable to get him to perform.
10	4	"Episode 4"	Abe Forsythe	Marieke Hardy	23 May 2012
Marcus tries to contact Roo, but EJ rebuffs him and takes Roo to a sexual healing retreat to keep her away from him. EJ has also lost patience with Zach's Jesus obsession and broken off with him; and Charlie attempts suicide.
11	5	"Episode 5"	Abe Forsythe	Kirsty Fisher	30 May 2012
Roo's great grandmother's funeral, her wake features a pinata. Marcus is impotent and blames Roo; she helps him rebuild his confidence. Zach meanwhile tries to take Marcus' place.
12	6	"Episode 6"	Abe Forsythe	Marieke Hardy	6 June 2012
Marcus decides he is in love with Roo and says he will have sex with her, if she will stay with him. Roo agrees, and as they have sex Charlie is cured. Roo then abandons Marcus and later, when he tries to cure another woman, she dies instead.

== Accolades ==
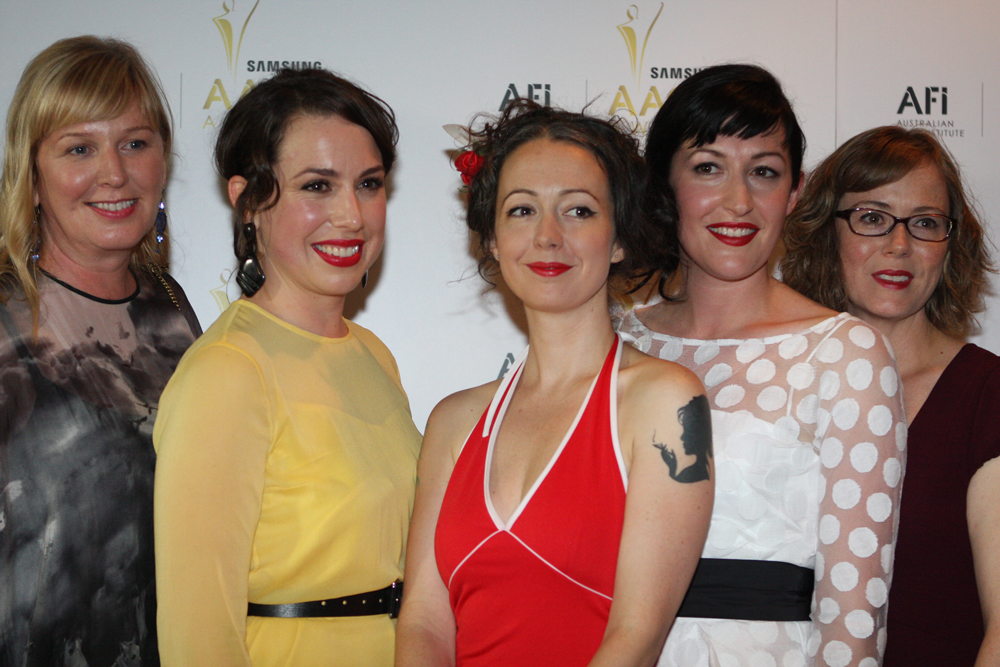
Left to right:Liz Watts, Alison Bell, Marieke Hardy, Celia Pacquola and Kirsty Fisher at AACTA Awards 2012

Year	Award	Category	Recipients and nominees	Result
2011	AACTA Awards	Best Comedy Performance	Alison Bell	Nominated
2011	AACTA Awards	Best Comedy Performance	Celia Pacquola	Nominated
2011	AACTA Awards	Best Comedy Series	Liz Watts	Won
2011	AACTA Awards	Best Screenplay	Kirsty Fisher	Nominated
2011	Australian Writers' Guild Awards	Best Situation or Narrative Episode	Marieke Hardy	Won
2012	Australian Directors Guild Awards	Best Direction in a TV Comedy Series	Trent O'Donnell	Nominated
2012	Australian Writers' Guild Awards	Best Situation or Narrative Episode	Marieke Hardy	Nominated
2012	Monte-Carlo Television Festival	Outstanding Actor in a Comedy Series	Damon Herriman	Nominated

== Home media ==
The first series of Laid was released on DVD under the title of Laid: The Complete First Season on 7 April 2011. The second series was released on DVD under the title of Laid: The Complete Second Season on 5 July 2012.

== American version ==
In October 2011, it was reported that television network NBC bought the rights to adapt an American version of the series. On 11 January 2024, Peacock gave production a straight-to-series order for an American version of Laid which is developed by Nahnatchka Khan and Sally Bradford McKenna. Stephanie Hsu is in the lead role. It premiered on 19 December 2024.
