= The Letdown =

Australian comedy television series

- Genre: Comedy drama
- Created by: Sarah Scheller; Alison Bell
- Written by: Sarah Scheller; Alison Bell
- Directed by: Trent O'Donnell
- Country of origin: Australia
- No. of series: 2
- No. of episodes: 13

Production
- Executive producers: Julian Morrow; Rick Kalowski; Rebecca Anderson
- Production company: Giant Dwarf Pty Ltd

Original release
- Network: ABC
- Release: 4 May 2016 – 3 July 2019

The Letdown is an Australian comedy drama television series that first premiered on ABC in 2016. It follows the adventures of Audrey, including her struggles as a new mum in an oddball mothers' group. It ran for two seasons between 4 May 2016 and 3 July 2019.

The title is a play on the word letdown, which refers to the let-down reflex in breastfeeding, but is also a colloquialism for disappointment, both of which are key elements of Audrey's story.

== Production ==
=== First series ===
The series began as part of the comedy anthology series Comedy Showroom which screened on 4 May 2016. It was one of six new comedies screened in the series, which were seen as potential pilots for a full TV series.

In June 2017, the show was picked up to series by ABC, with Netflix as a co-producer. The series premiered on 25 October 2017 on ABC. The series premiered internationally on Netflix on 21 April 2018.

=== Second series ===
A second series was produced 2019 and began airing from 29 May 2019.

In the second series, Audrey's daughter is a one-year-old toddler and her partner Jeremy is living and working in Adelaide. Audrey and her friends continue to struggle with parenthood into the toddler years. At the end of the first series, Audrey discovers that she's unexpectedly pregnant.

As the second series goes on, we learn that Audrey had an abortion because she and Jeremy were not ready for a second child and because her clinician told her that a second pregnancy might rupture her uterus. Audrey tells her aloof, artsy mum about the abortion and finds out that her mum also had an abortion. During the last episode, she shares her abortion with her clinician and with her mothers' group, all of whom are supportive. Ester, a member of the mothers' group, also shares that she had an abortion when she was younger.

== Cast ==
=== Main ===
- Alison Bell as Audrey
- Duncan Fellows as Jeremy
- Noni Hazlehurst as Ambrose
- Sacha Horler as Ester
- Lucy Durack as Sophie
- Leon Ford as Ruben
- Celeste Barber as Barbara
- Taylor Ferguson as Jenna
- Leah Vandenberg as Martha
- Xana Tang as Georgia
- Sarah Peirse as Verity

=== Guests ===
- Valerie Bader as Carol
- Patrick Brammall as Scott
- Brendan Cowell as Harry
- Maggie Kirkpatrick as Lois
- Gareth Davies
- Rachel Gordon
- John Leary as Dave
- Wayne Blair as Father Whyman
- Ming-Zhu Hii as Catherine
- Greg Larsen as Kim
- Jason Smith as Angus
- Roz Hammond as Christine
- Fayssal Bazzi as Tony
- Peter Carroll as Dr Julian
- Lani Tupu as Jimmy

== Awards ==
Series 1 won an AACTA Award for Best TV Comedy Program in 2018. The Pilot Episode won the AACTA Award for Best Television Screenplay in 2016.

At the ARIA Music Awards of 2020, the soundtrack was nominated for Best Original Soundtrack, Cast or Show Album.

== Episodes ==
| Series | Episodes | Originally released | |
| Series | Episodes | First released | Last released |
|---|---|---|---|
| 1 | 7 | 4 May 2016 | 6 December 2017 |
| 2 | 6 | 29 May 2019 | 3 July 2019 |

=== Series 1 (2016–2017) ===
| No. overall | No. in series | Title | Directed by | Written by | Original release date | Australia viewers |
|---|---|---|---|---|---|---|
| 1 | 1 | "Pilot" | Trent O'Donnell | Sarah Scheller & Alison Bell | 4 May 2016 | N/A |
| 2 | 2 | "Frankenstein" | Trent O'Donnell | Sarah Scheller & Alison Bell | 1 November 2017 | 424,000 |
| 3 | 3 | "Genealogy" | Trent O'Donnell | Sarah Scheller & Alison Bell | 8 November 2017 | 455,000 |
| 4 | 4 | "Trivial Pursuits" | Trent O'Donnell | Sarah Scheller & Alison Bell | 15 November 2017 | N/A |
| 5 | 5 | "Super Mum" | Trent O'Donnell | Sarah Scheller & Alison Bell | 22 November 2017 | 474,000 |
| 6 | 6 | "Mother Nature" | Trent O'Donnell | Sarah Scheller & Alison Bell | 29 November 2017 | 450,000 |
| 7 | 7 | "Matrescence" | Trent O'Donnell | Sarah Scheller & Alison Bell | 6 December 2017 | 426,000 |

=== Series 2 (2019) ===
| No. overall | No. in series | Title | Directed by | Written by | Original release date | Australia viewers |
|---|---|---|---|---|---|---|
| 8 | 1 | "One" | Amanda Brotchie | Sarah Scheller & Alison Bell | 29 May 2019 | N/A |
| 9 | 2 | "The Dilemma" | Sarah Scheller & Alison Bell | Sarah Scheller & Alison Bell | 5 June 2019 | N/A |
| 10 | 3 | "He's a Girl" | Trent O'Donnell | Sarah Scheller & Alison Bell | 12 June 2019 | N/A |
| 11 | 4 | "Heavy Heart" | Trent O'Donnell | Sarah Scheller & Alison Bell | 19 June 2019 | N/A |
| 12 | 5 | "Rat Park" | Amanda Brotchie | Sarah Scheller & Alison Bell | 26 June 2019 | N/A |
| 13 | 6 | "Shameless" | Trent O'Donnell | Sarah Scheller & Alison Bell | 3 July 2019 | N/A |
