= Rowan Woods =

Australian film director

- Born: Sydney, New South Wales, Australia
- Occupations: Film and television director; actor; screenwriter
- Years active: 1988–present

Rowan Woods is an Australian AACTA Award-winning film and television director, best known for the 1998 film The Boys and the 2016 television drama series The Kettering Incident.

== Career ==
=== Film ===
Woods directed The Boys in 1998 and won an ACCTA Award for Best Direction. The film was also entered into the 48th Berlin International Film Festival. His next film, Little Fish, starring Cate Blanchett, was released in September 2005.

His 2009 film, Fragments received mixed, but mostly negative reviews from critics.

=== Television ===
Woods has directed episodes of several television series, including Farscape, Fireflies, Police Rescue, and Spartacus: Blood and Sand.

In 2012, he directed The Straits, and some episodes of Rake between 2012 and 2016. In 2016, he directed the acclaimed The Kettering Incident, and also Nowhere Boys.

In 2013, he directed The Broken Shore, a Duncan Lawrie Dagger award-winning novel by Australian author Peter Temple.

== Other roles ==
Since December 2021 and as of November 2023, Woods is president of the Australian Directors' Guild.

== Awards and nominations ==
Woods has been nominated for many awards and won several, including:

- 1998: Winner, Best Achievement in Direction in the AFI Awards, for The Boys
- 1998: Nominee, Golden Bear in the Berlin International Film Festival, for The Boys
- 1999: Winner, Best Director in the FCCA Awards, for The Boys
- 1999: Winner, Readers' Award for Favourite Australian Film in the FCCA Awards, for The Boys
- 2001: Nominee, Best Direction in a Television Drama in the AFI Awards, for Do or Die
- 2005: Nominee, Best Director in the FCCA Awards, for Little Fish
- 2005: Nominee, Best Direction in the AFI Awards, for Little Fish
- 2005: Nominee, Best Direction in the IF Awards, for Little Fish
- 2006: Nominee, Best Direction in the Zurich Film Festival, for Little Fish
- 2014: Winner, Best Direction in a Telemovie in the ADG Awards, for The Broken Shore
- 2015: Nominee, Best Direction in a Television Drama Series in the ADG Awards, for Rake
- 2016: Nominee, Best Direction in a Television Drama or Comedy in the AACTA Awards, for The Kettering Incident
