= Elizabeth Debicki =

Australian actress (born 1990)

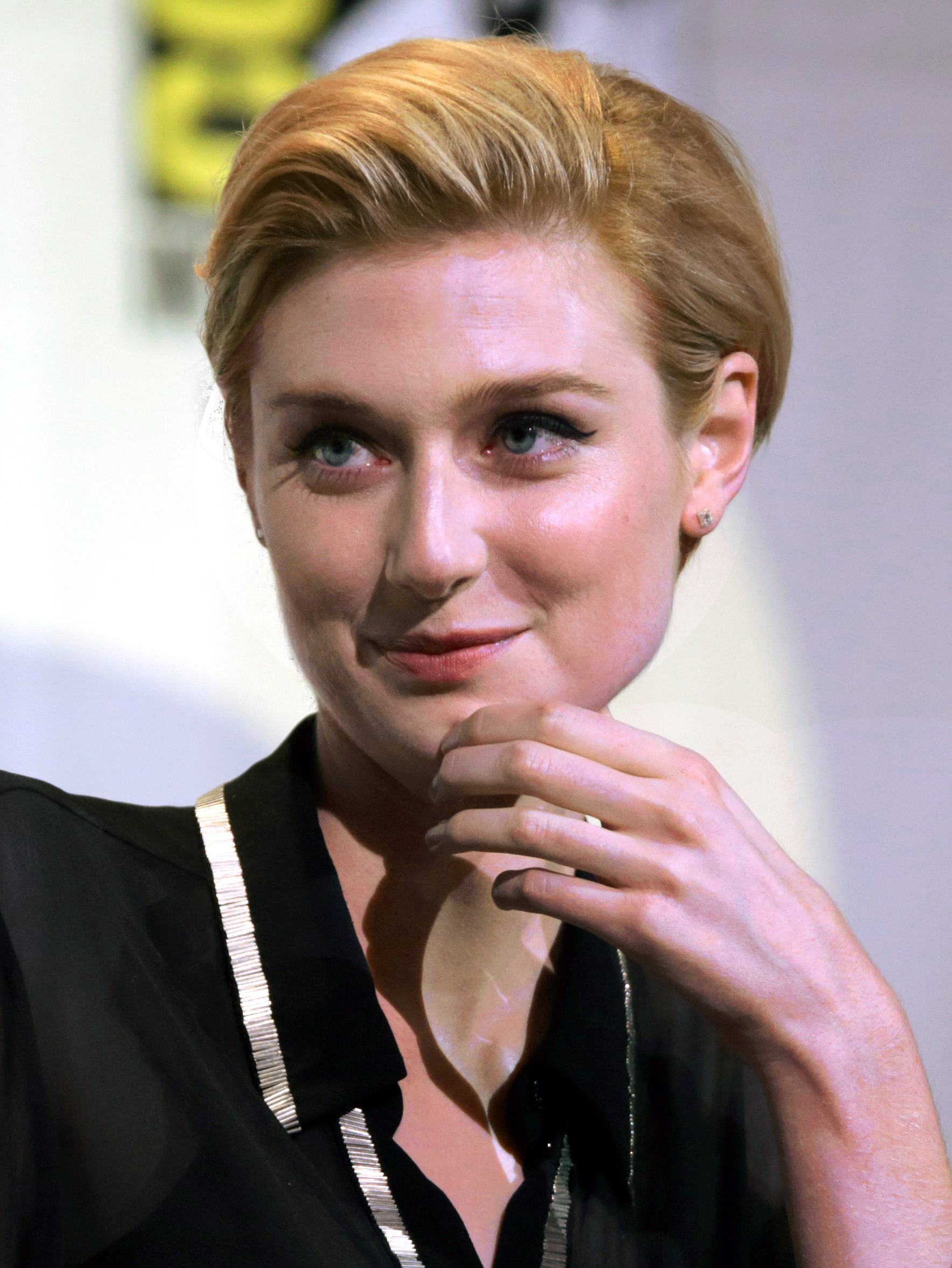
- Debicki in 2016
- Born: 24 August 1990 (age 36); Paris, France
- Citizenship: Australia
- Education: University of Melbourne
- Occupation: Actress
- Years active: 2010–present

Elizabeth Debicki (born 24 August 1990) is an Australian actress. Known for her work across screen and stage, her acting philosophy incorporates dance training, with emphasis on physical detail, posture, and movement. Her accolades include a Primetime Emmy Award, a Golden Globe, a Trophée Chopard and three AACTA Awards, in addition to a nomination for a BAFTA Award.

Born in Paris and raised in Melbourne, Debicki trained in dance before studying drama at the University of Melbourne's Victorian College of the Arts. She made her feature film debut in A Few Best Men (2011). Her first major screen role was as Jordan Baker in Baz Luhrmann's The Great Gatsby (2013). Her early stage work included the Sydney Theatre Company production of The Maids. In 2016, Debicki starred in the miniseries The Kettering Incident and The Night Manager. She subsequently starred in the Hollywood thriller films Widows (2018) and Tenet (2020).

Debicki earned greater recognition for her portrayal of Diana, Princess of Wales, in the final two seasons of the Netflix period drama series The Crown (2022–2023), becoming the first Australian to win the Primetime Emmy Award for Outstanding Supporting Actress in a Drama Series. She then starred in the horror film MaXXXine (2024) and made her West End debut in My Master Builder (2025).

== Early life and education ==
Debicki was born on 24 August 1990 in Paris, France, to a Polish father and an Australian mother of Irish descent. Her parents were both ballet dancers. The family moved to Melbourne, Victoria, when Debicki was five years old. The eldest of three children, she has a sister and a brother.

Debicki became interested in ballet early in life and trained as a dancer before turning to theatre. After growing taller than her teachers by the age of 12, Debicki concluded that she was unlikely to pursue ballet professionally; however, Debicki continued dancing until she entered acting school.

Debicki attended Huntingtower School in eastern Melbourne, where she achieved two perfect study scores in drama and English, and was the school's dux when she graduated in 2007. In 2009, while in her second year of training, Debicki received a Richard Pratt Bursary for outstanding acting students. The next year, she completed a bachelor's degree in drama at the University of Melbourne's Victorian College of the Arts.

== Career ==
=== Early work and international roles (2011–2016) ===
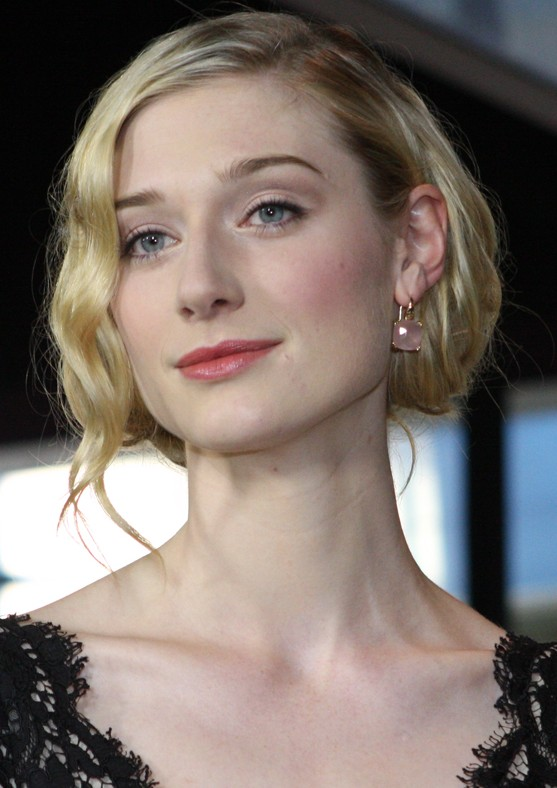
Debicki at a Sydney premiere for A Few Best Men in 2012.

Debicki's first professional screen role was in the 2011 comedy film A Few Best Men, in which she played a secretary. Her first major screen role came soon afterwards, when director Baz Luhrmann cast her as Jordan Baker in The Great Gatsby (2013), his adaptation of F. Scott Fitzgerald's novel. While rehearsing her first Melbourne Theatre Company play, Debicki taped a screen test for Jordan Baker, then flew to Los Angeles for a second audition with Luhrmann. She appeared in the film, released in 2013, opposite Leonardo DiCaprio, Tobey Maguire and Carey Mulligan, and won the AACTA Award for Best Supporting Actress in Film.

In 2013, Debicki played Madame in the Sydney Theatre Company production of Jean Genet's The Maids, opposite Cate Blanchett as Claire and Isabelle Huppert as Solange. The Guardian noted her imposing stage presence and the use of small movements and phrasing to show Madame's hold over the maids. She won the best newcomer award at the Sydney Theatre Awards, and the production later played at the New York City Center. She also appeared in the third season of the Australian television series Rake. In 2015, Debicki appeared in Guy Ritchie's The Man from U.N.C.L.E., Justin Kurzel's Macbeth, and the biographical adventure film Everest.

In 2016, she returned to the London stage as Mona Sanders in The Red Barn, a David Hare adaptation of Georges Simenon's novel La Main, at the Lyttelton Theatre. In television, Debicki starred as Dr Anna Macy in The Kettering Incident (2016), an eight-part Australian mystery miniseries set in Tasmania. The Guardian described the series as an eight-part Tasmanian gothic thriller whose central mystery follows Anna's return to her childhood town. The role won Debicki the 2016 AACTA Award for Best Lead Actress in a Television Drama, while the series won Best Telefeature or Miniseries. She also played Jed Marshall in the BBC miniseries The Night Manager (2016), adapted from the John le Carré novel of the same name. A 2020 profile in The Guardian said the role, which appeared slight on the page, became more powerful in her performance, and reported that le Carré told Debicki she had made Jed more interesting than he had written her.

=== Film roles and Widows (2017–2021) ===
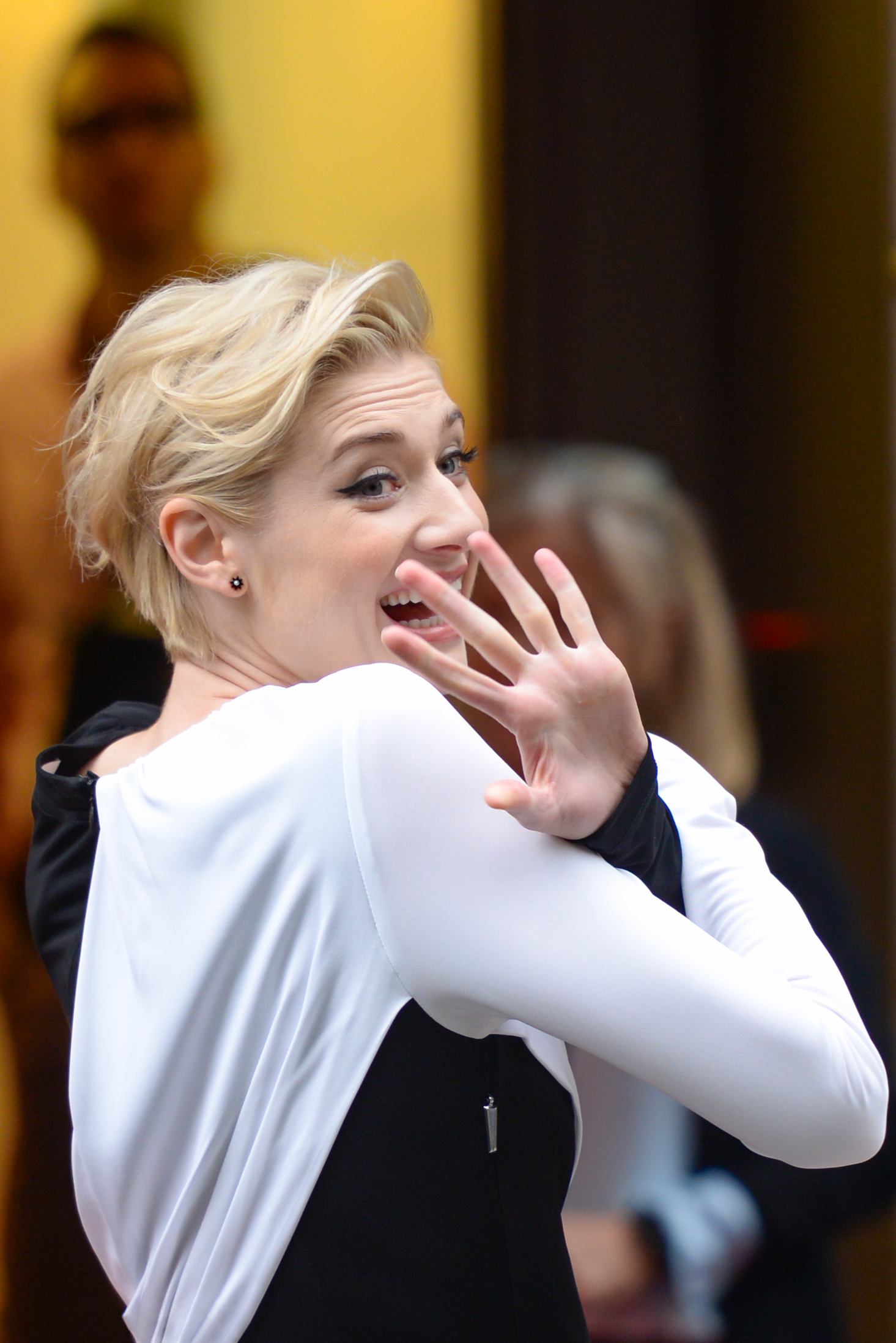
Debicki at the 2018 Toronto International Film Festival

In 2017, Debicki played Ayesha, leader of the Sovereign people, in the Marvel Studios film Guardians of the Galaxy Vol. 2. She later reprised the role in Guardians of the Galaxy Vol. 3 (2023). The same year, she joined Luc Besson's Valerian and the City of a Thousand Planets in a voice-over role and played Eva, the wife of Simon Baker's character, in the Australian film Breath. Her performance in Breath earned an AACTA Award nomination for Best Actress in a Supporting Role.

Debicki's 2018 roles included the science fiction film The Cloverfield Paradox, the HBO film The Tale, the live-action/animated film Peter Rabbit, and Vita & Virginia, in which she portrayed Virginia Woolf. She also played Alice in Steve McQueen's heist film Widows, co-starring Viola Davis, Michelle Rodriguez and Cynthia Erivo. Writing about the film, Vulture said Debicki had become known for glamorous parts and that Widows gave her the chance to play an ordinary woman. Debicki told GQ that she had wanted to play a character who felt real and multidimensional. Brian Tallerico of RogerEbert.com called Alice Debicki's breakthrough role.

Debicki next appeared opposite Claes Bang and Mick Jagger in the 2019 thriller The Burnt Orange Heresy, playing Berenice Hollis. In Christopher Nolan's spy film Tenet (2020), she played Kat, an art specialist trapped in a marriage to Kenneth Branagh's Russian oligarch. Nolan sought Debicki for the role, which brought one of the film's more direct emotional threads. Debicki later described the role as physically and emotionally demanding, especially in scenes involving Kat and Sator. She was also among the cast of the sequel Peter Rabbit 2: The Runaway (2021).

=== The Crown and later work (2022–present) ===
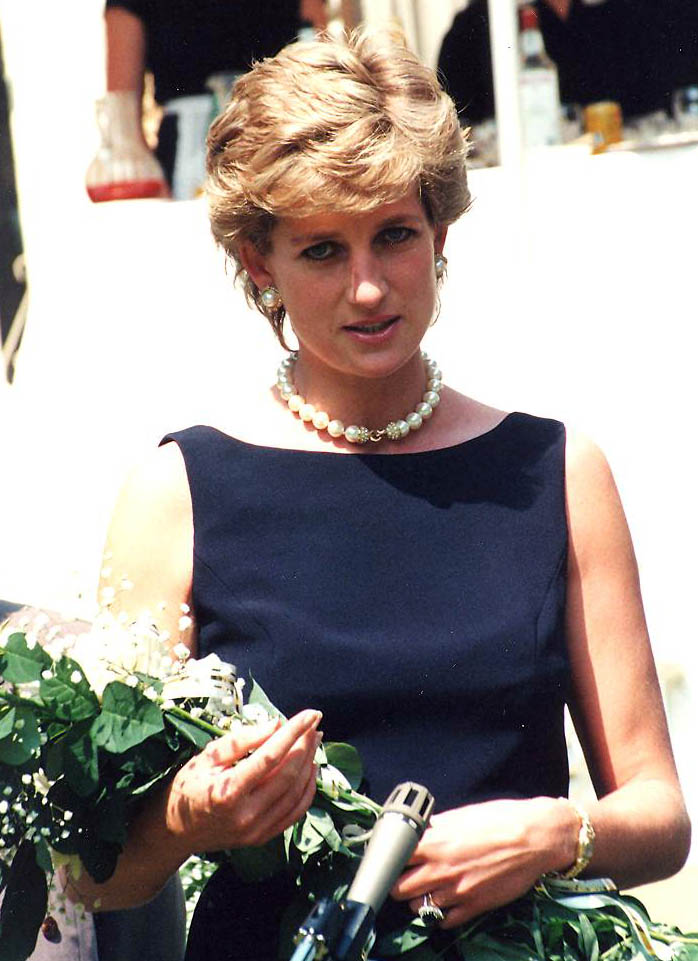
Diana, Princess of Wales, pictured in 1995. Debicki portrayed her in the final two seasons of The Crown.

Debicki portrayed Diana, Princess of Wales, in the final two seasons of the Netflix period drama series The Crown from 2022 to 2023. She played Diana during the 1990s, including the final years of her marriage to Prince Charles, the Panorama interview, and her final days in 1997. Debicki worked on Diana's accent and physical mannerisms, and later said the role was unusually vulnerable because it required her to work from public history, fact and opinion rather than inventing a fictional backstory. Speaking about the sixth season, she said filming the paparazzi scenes was physically stressful and made it difficult to relax after leaving the set.

The role became the most visible work of Debicki's career up to that point, following several years of supporting roles in film and television. Reviews of the fifth season highlighted her handling of Diana's look and mannerisms, while later coverage of the sixth season noted the warmth and vulnerability of Diana's relationship with Dodi Fayed. Her performance in the fifth season earned nominations from the Primetime Emmy, Golden Globe, and Screen Actors Guild awards. For the sixth and final season, she won the Golden Globe, Critics' Choice, Screen Actors Guild, and Primetime Emmy awards. Her Emmy win made her the first Australian actress to win Outstanding Supporting Actress in a Drama Series.

After The Crown, Debicki said she wanted to do something different and joined Ti West's horror film MaXXXine (2024), playing film director Elizabeth Bender. Peter Bradshaw of The Guardian wrote that the film was nearly stolen by Debicki's supporting performance as Bender, whom he described as a demanding British director and Maxine's mentor. In 2025, she returned to the London stage opposite Ewan McGregor in Lila Raicek's My Master Builder, a contemporary play inspired by Henrik Ibsen's The Master Builder, at Wyndham's Theatre in the West End. Debicki is set to appear in David Fincher's Netflix film The Further Mis-Adventures of Cliff Booth, a follow-up to Quentin Tarantino's Once Upon a Time in Hollywood centred on Cliff Booth.

== Acting approach and screen image ==
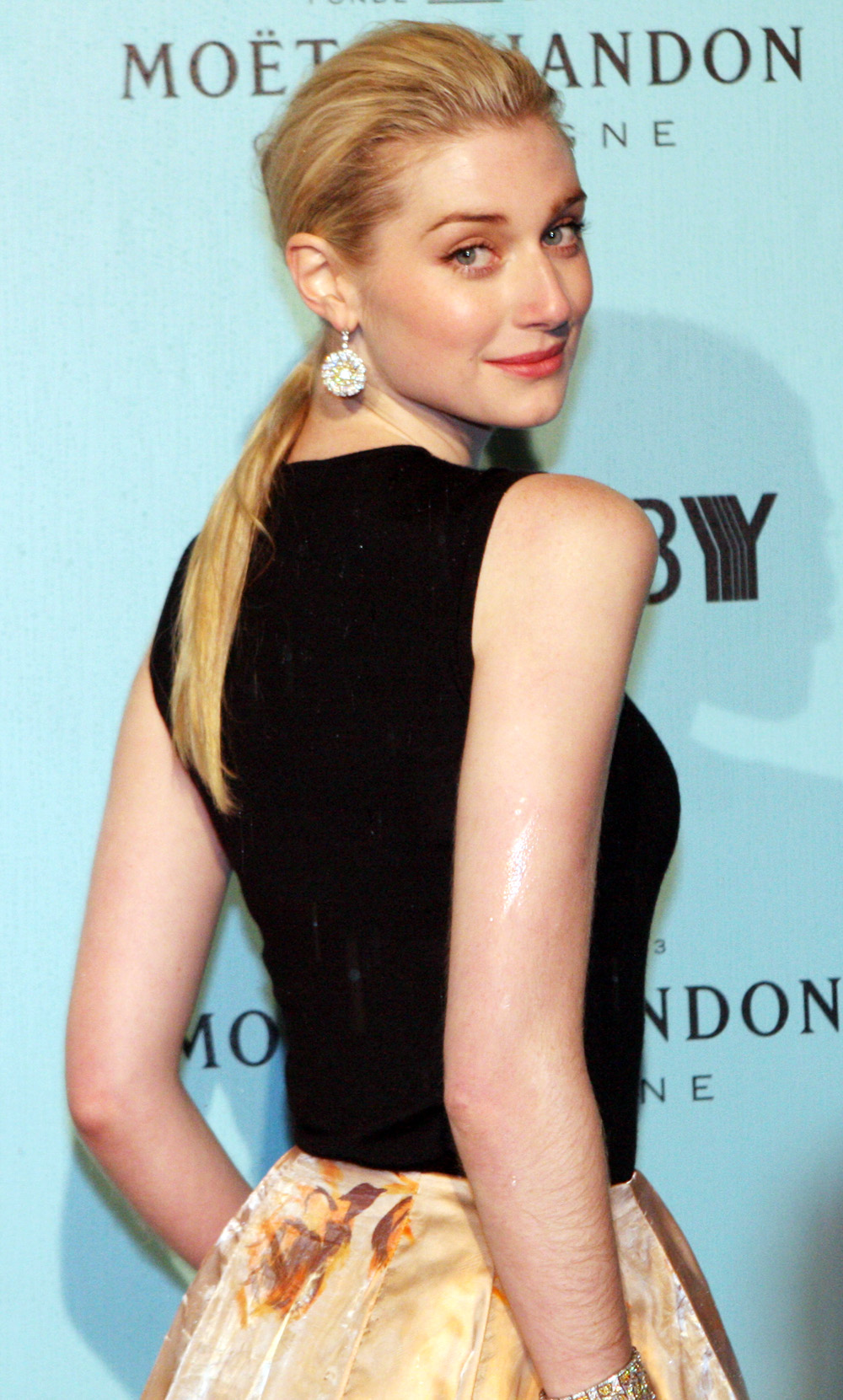
Debicki at The Great Gatsby premiere in Sydney, 2013

Debicki has described acting in terms of physical awareness. Having trained in dance before turning to theatre, she told Allure that dance gave her an awareness of the body and that acting felt like a related medium shaped through language. Her screen performances have often drawn on restraint and stillness; Rebecca Nicholson of The Guardian connected characters such as Jed Marshall in The Night Manager and Kat in Tenet through their private sadness and physical reserve. For The Crown, Debicki studied footage of Diana, Princess of Wales, and worked with a movement coach to find the "emotional logic" behind Diana's posture, gaze and gestures rather than simply copying her movements.

Critical attention to Debicki's physical acting increased with Widows and The Crown. Reviews of Widows focused on her use of body language as Alice moves from fear and dependence towards self-possession. Her portrayal of Diana drew sustained attention for its physical and vocal precision, while Diana biographer Andrew Morton was struck by her likeness to the princess.

Debicki's tall stature (Note: Sources have variously reported her height as 6 ft 2 in (1.88 m) or 6 ft 3 in (1.91 m).) and appearance have also influenced her screen image and casting. Vanity Fair described how costume designers used her height in The Great Gatsby, The Man from U.N.C.L.E. and The Night Manager. She has also noted a recurring pattern of being cast as affluent, unhappy women, though she said she could not explain what directors repeatedly saw in her for such roles.

== Acting credits ==
=== Film ===
Year	Title	Role	Notes
2011	A Few Best Men	Maureen	
2013	The Great Gatsby	Jordan Baker	
2015	Macbeth	Lady Macduff	
2015	The Man from U.N.C.L.E.	Victoria Vinciguerra	
2015	Everest	Caroline Mackenzie	
2017	Guardians of the Galaxy Vol. 2	Ayesha	
2017	Valerian and the City of a Thousand Planets	Emperor Haban Limaï	Voice
2017	Breath	Eva	
2017	7 from Etheria	Serita Cedric	Collection of shorts
2018	The Cloverfield Paradox	Mina Jensen	
2018	Peter Rabbit	Mopsy Rabbit	Voice
2018	Widows	Alice	
2018	Vita & Virginia	Virginia Woolf	
2019	The Burnt Orange Heresy	Berenice Hollis	
2020	Tenet	Catherine Barton	
2021	Peter Rabbit 2: The Runaway	Mopsy Rabbit	Voice
2023	Guardians of the Galaxy Vol. 3	Ayesha	
2024	MaXXXine	Elizabeth Bender	
2026	Wicker	The Tailor's Wife	
2026	The Further Mis-Adventures of Cliff Booth	Karen Crosby	

=== Television ===
Year	Title	Role	Notes
2014	Rake	"Missy"	Season 3, Episode 3
2016	The Kettering Incident	Dr Anna Macy	8 episodes
2016	The Night Manager	Jed Marshall	6 episodes
2018	The Tale	Mrs. G	Television film (HBO)
2022–2023	The Crown	Diana, Princess of Wales	Main role (seasons 5–6)

=== Theatre ===
Year	Production	Role	Playwright	Venue	Ref.
2010	The Gift	Chloë	Joanna Murray-Smith	Melbourne Theatre Company	
2013–2014	The Maids	Madame	Jean Genet	Sydney Theatre Company; New York City Center	
2016	The Red Barn	Mona Sanders	David Hare	Lyttelton Theatre, London	
2025	My Master Builder	Mathilde	Lila Raicek	Wyndham's Theatre, West End	
2027	Richard II	King Richard II	William Shakespeare	Royal Shakespeare Theatre, Stratford-upon-Avon	

== Awards and nominations ==
Year	Association	Category	Work	Result	Ref.
2014	Australian Academy of Cinema and Television Arts	Best Actress in a Supporting Role	The Great Gatsby	Won	
2014	Helpmann Awards	Best Female Actor in a Supporting Role in a Play	The Maids	Nominated	
2014	Sydney Theatre Awards	Best Newcomer	The Maids	Won	
2016	Critics' Choice Television Awards	Best Supporting Actress in a Movie or Miniseries	The Night Manager	Nominated	
2016	Australian Academy of Cinema and Television Arts	Best Lead Actress in a Television Drama	The Kettering Incident	Won	
2017	Logie Awards	Most Outstanding Actress	The Kettering Incident	Nominated	
2018	Cannes Film Festival	Trophée Chopard	—	Won	
2018	Australian Academy of Cinema and Television Arts	Best Actress in a Supporting Role	Breath	Nominated	
2018	Critics' Choice Awards	Best Acting Ensemble (shared with the ensemble)	Widows	Nominated	
2018	Chicago Film Critics Association	Best Supporting Actress	Widows	Nominated	
2018	London Film Critics' Circle	Supporting Actress of the Year	Widows	Nominated	
2018	Los Angeles Film Critics Association	Best Supporting Actress	Widows	Runner-up	
2019	National Society of Film Critics	Best Supporting Actress	Widows	Runner-up	
2019	Online Film Critics Society	Best Supporting Actress	Widows	Nominated	
2023	Golden Globe Awards	Best Supporting Actress – Series, Miniseries or Television Film	The Crown	Nominated	
2023	AACTA International Awards	Best Actress in a Series	The Crown	Nominated	
2023	Actor Awards	Outstanding Performance by a Female Actor in a Drama Series	The Crown	Nominated	
2023	Primetime Emmy Awards	Outstanding Supporting Actress in a Drama Series	The Crown	Nominated	
2024	Golden Globe Awards	Best Supporting Actress – Series, Miniseries or Television Film	The Crown	Won	
2024	Critics' Choice Awards	Best Supporting Actress in a Drama Series	The Crown	Won	
2024	AACTA International Awards	Best Actress in a Series	The Crown	Nominated	
2024	Actor Awards	Outstanding Performance by a Female Actor in a Drama Series	The Crown	Won	
2024	British Academy Television Awards	Best Supporting Actress	The Crown	Nominated	
2024	Primetime Emmy Awards	Outstanding Supporting Actress in a Drama Series	The Crown	Won	
2025	AACTA International Awards	Best Actress in a Series	The Crown	Won	
