= Alison Bell (actress) =

Australian actress

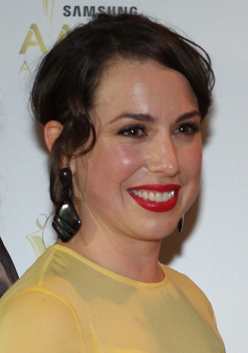
- Bell at AACTA Awards, 2012
- Born: 1978 (age 47–48); Young, New South Wales Australia
- Education: St Clare's College, Canberra; Australian National University (2001); Victorian College of the Arts (2004)
- Occupations: Actress & writer
- Known for: Laid; The Letdown
- Spouse: John Leary
- Children: 1

Alison Bell is an Australian stage, film and television actress and writer.

== Early life and education ==
Born in Young, New South Wales, Bell grew up in Grenfell where she attended St Joseph's School. The family then moved to Canberra in 1984, where she went to Sacred Heart Primary School, before going on to study high school at St Clare's College, where she became school captain.

Bell studied drama while at school, with the intent of pursuing a career as an actor. However, after her graduation she enrolled at Australian National University (ANU), completing an Arts/Law degree in 2001. While at university, she participated in several theatre productions and took a job as a researcher/editor for Butterworth's Publishing. On completion of her studies, she auditioned for both the National Institute of Dramatic Art (NIDA) and Victorian College of the Arts (VCA), ultimately undertaking the acting course at VCA and graduating in 2004.

== Career ==
Bell has worked in television, documentary film and theatre. In 2010, she starred in comedy drama series I Rock, as Jane, music journalist and ex-girlfriend of central character, Nash Taylor (played by Josh Mapleston). She became known for her performance as Roo McVie on ABC TV series Laid, from 2011 to 2012, for which she was nominated for an AACTA Award.

After appearing in several television guest roles, Bell played Liz Linton, mother of one of the protagonists in the 2016 drama miniseries Tomorrow When the War Began, an adaptation of the 1993 John Marsden novel of the same name.

From 2017 to 2019, Bell starred in the acclaimed ABC TV series The Letdown, as Audrey, the main character. She also served as co-writer, co-creator, producer and director of the series. She won the AACTA Award for Best Television Comedy Series for both seasons as well as Best Comedy Performer and Best Screenplay. Her role as Audrey also won her the AACTA Award for Best Performance in a Television Comedy. Additionally, she earned a nomination for Best Director of a TV Comedy or Drama.

Bell featured in 2021 four-part colonial drama miniseries New Gold Mountain for SBS, in the role of Clara, society wife of the Ballarat Commissioner (played by Rhys Muldoon). She then starred as Claire in 2022 ABC TV mystery drama miniseries Significant Others, alongside Jacqueline McKenzie and Rachael Blake.

Bell has also acted for the stage, including a noteworthy performance in Sydney Theatre Company's production of Doubt in 2006, for which she won a Helpmann Award.

== Awards ==
Year	Work	Award	Category	Result	Ref.
2006	Doubt	Helpmann Awards	Best Female Actor in a Supporting Role in a Play	Won	
2007	Doubt	Green Room Awards	Best Female Performer	Won	
2008	2007 Body of work: Who's Afraid of Virginia Woolf?, Sleeping Beauty, The Sook	Green Room Awards	Best Female Performer	Won	
2009	Blackbird	Helpmann Awards	Best Female Actor in a Play	Nominated	
2009	Blackbird	Green Room Awards	Best Female Actor	Nominated	
2011	Laid	AACTA Awards	Best Performance in a Television Comedy	Nominated	
2011	Laid	IF Awards	Out of the Box Award	Nominated	
2012	Laid	Festival de Television de Monte Carlo Awards	Outstanding Actress in a Comedy TV Series	Nominated	
2012	Old Man	Sydney Theatre Awards	Best Supporting Actress	Nominated	
2012	Tribes	Green Room Awards	Best Female Actor	Nominated	
2013	Hedda Gabler	Helpmann Awards	Best Female Actor in a Play	Won	
2013	Constellations	Helpmann Awards	Best Female Actor in a Play	Nominated	
2016	The Letdown	AACTA Awards	Best Screenplay in Television	Won	
2016	The Letdown	AACTA Awards	Best Performance in a Television Comedy	Nominated	
2018	The Letdown	AACTA Awards	Best Television Comedy Series	Won	
2019	The Letdown	AACTA Awards	Best Performance in a Television Comedy	Won	
2019	The Letdown	AACTA Awards	Best Television Comedy Series	Won	
2026	Much Ado About Nothing	Green Room Awards	Outstanding Performance	Nominated (result pending)	

== Filmography ==
=== Television ===
Year	Title	Role	Notes
2005	Last Man Standing	Gen	2 episodes
2009	Packed to the Rafters	Susannah	2 episodes
2009	Rush	Anna	1 episode
2010	I Rock	Jane Humphries	8 episodes
2010	City Homicide	Kellie Briggs	1 episode
2011	Offspring	Louise	2 episodes
2011–2012	Laid	Roo McVie	12 episodes
2012	Mrs Biggs	Joan Walter	Miniseries, 2 episodes
2013	Mr & Mrs Murder	Holly Piper	Miniseries, 1 episode
2014	The Doctor Blake Mysteries	Adeline Campbell	1 episode
2015	House Husbands	Fiona Coates	1 episode
2016	Comedy Showroom: The Letdown	Audrey	TV movie
2016	Tomorrow When the War Began	Liz Linton	Miniseries, 6 episodes
2016	Upper Middle Bogan	Clara	1 episode
2017	The Leftovers	Aggie	1 episode
2017–2019	The Letdown	Audrey (main role); Also writer / creator	2 seasons, 13 episodes
2018	Olivia Newton-John: Hopelessly Devoted to You	Betsey Cox (uncredited)	Miniseries, 1 episode
2018	No Activity	Leary	1 episode
2020	Amazing Stories	Helen Harris	Episode: "Dynoman and the Volt"
2021	New Gold Mountain	Clara Wright	Miniseries, 4 episodes
2022	Summer Love	Hannah	1 episode
2022	Significant Others	Claire	Miniseries, 6 episodes
2026	Deadloch	Detective Wilson	2 episodes
2026	Shakedown	Kath Madgwick	TV mini series: 2 episodes

=== Film ===
Year	Title	Role	Notes
2007	Bookstore Reunion	Sarah	Short film
2008	Wasting Away	Alice Griggs	Short film
2009	Further We Search	Sue	Feature film
2013	The Exchange	Mother	Short film
2013	Purcell Purcell	Purcell Purcell	Short film
2014	Meeting Susan	Jen	Short film
2018	Joy Boy	Lynn	Short film

=== Theatre ===
Year	Production	Role	Theatre	Ref.
2005	King Lear	Cordelia and The Fool	Melbourne Theatre Company	
2006	Doubt		Sydney Theatre Company	
2008	Blackbird	Una	Melbourne Theatre Company	
2011	As You Like It	Rosalind	Belvoir St Theatre, Sydney	
2012	Tribes	Sylvia	Melbourne Theatre Company	
2013	Hedda Gabler	Hedda Gabler	State Theatre Company of South Australia	
2013	Constellations	Marianne	Melbourne Theatre Company	
2015	Betrayal	Emma	Dunstan Playhouse, Adelaide with State Theatre Company of South Australia	
2017	Three Sisters	Olga	Sydney Theatre Company	
2018	NASSIM	solo performance	Arts Centre Melbourne	
2025	Much Ado About Nothing	Beatrice	Melbourne Theatre Company	
