= Marieke Hardy =

Australian writer and broadcaster

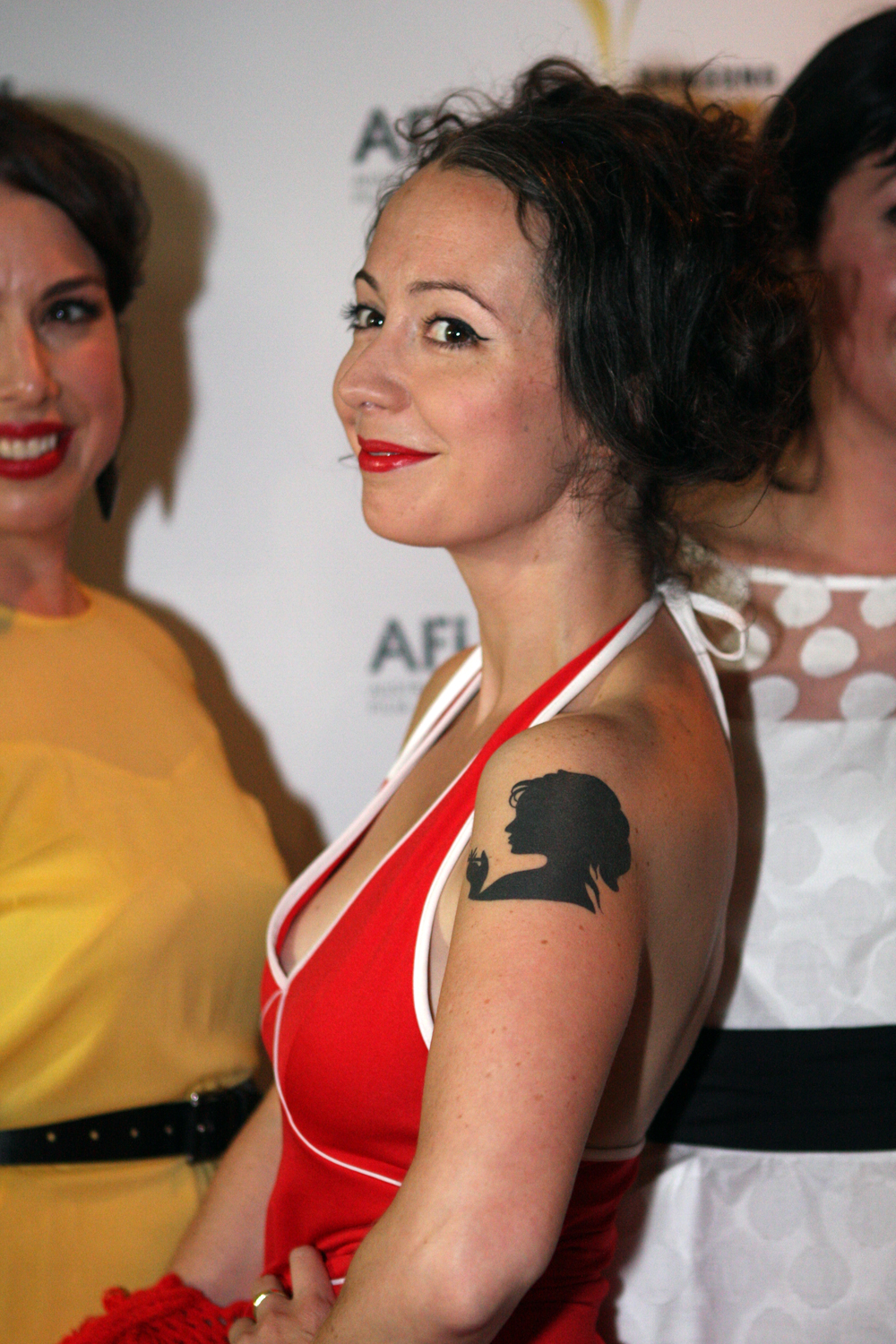
- Hardy in 2012
- Born: Marieke Josephine Hardy; Melbourne, Australia
- Education: Carey Baptist Grammar School; Swinburne Senior Secondary College
- Occupations: Writer; actress; television producer; radio and television presenter; screenwriter; actress
- Relatives: Alan Hardy, Galia Hardy, Frank Hardy, Mary Hardy
- Writing career
- Language: English
- Notable works: Laid; Packed to the Rafters; Last Man Standing; Short Cuts; Neighbours

Marieke Josephine Hardy is an Australian writer, radio and television presenter, television producer and screenwriter, and former television actress.

== Early life and education ==
Hardy is the granddaughter of Frank Hardy, author of Power Without Glory, and the grandniece of comedian and radio and television presenter Mary Hardy. Her parents Alan and Galia Hardy were writers, producers and editors on several Australian television series including The Sullivans and All the Rivers Run.

Hardy was raised in the Melbourne suburbs of Hawthorn East and Richmond.

Hardy was educated at Carey Baptist Grammar School and Swinburne Senior Secondary College in Melbourne.

She was a passionate supporter of the Fitzroy Football Club until their disbandment from the AFL competition in 1996.

== Career ==
=== Radio ===
Hardy co-hosted Melbourne's 3RRR radio show Best of the Brat on Tuesday nights from April 1996 to December 2007, under the pseudonym Holly C. The show was known as "the most immature show on Australian radio". Almost immediately following her departure from RRR, in January 2008 she began co-hosting the breakfast show on Triple J, the ABC's youth radio station, with Robbie Buck and Lindsay "The Doctor" McDougall. In December 2009, Hardy announced she was leaving Triple J to concentrate on her writing career. On 23 September 2024, it was announced that Hardy had joined former breakfast radio host Jo Stanley alongside several others for the launch of the Broad Radio radio platform, as Broad Radio had been in podcast form since 2020, Hardy had been a co-host previously.

=== Television ===
Working in the entertainment industry from a young age as an actress, Hardy appeared in such television programs as The Henderson Kids II, All Together Now, Neighbours, A Country Practice and various television commercials before pursuing a career as a scriptwriter.

In 2005, Hardy co-wrote and produced a 22-episode drama series for the Seven Network called Last Man Standing, starring Rodger Corser, Travis McMahon and Matt Passmore. The series struggled to gain ratings for its prime-time slot and was cancelled after one series.

Hardy was a regular panellist (or book club member) on the ABC1 literary review show, First Tuesday Book Club.

From 2008, Hardy wrote 11 episodes of Packed to the Rafters, starting with the third episode of the first season. She wrote episodes for every season up to the fourth.

After leaving Triple J in 2010, Hardy returned to television writing, working on the Comedy Channel advertising industry sitcom 30 Seconds.

In 2011, with Kirsty Fisher, she co-created and co-wrote six-part TV series Laid for the ABC.

In 2021, it was announced that Hardy was part of the writing team for the new version of Heartbreak High. She also served as a writer on ABC series Barons.

In 2024, it was announced that Hardy was part of the writing team for Stan series Sunny Nights.

=== Newspaper columnist and blog ===
Hardy penned a blog called Reasons You Will Hate Me under the pseudonym "Ms Fits" which won a Bloggie award for Best Australia/New Zealand blog in 2008.

She wrote commentary columns for The Age newspaper's "Green Guide" TV section ("Back Chat") and "Life & Style" ("formally A2") section, as well as contributing to Frankie magazine. She resigned from the "Green Guide" in November 2009 due to other writing commitments.

=== Books ===
Hardy signed a two-book deal with publishers Allen & Unwin, and the first of those books, You'll Be Sorry When I'm Dead, was published in 2011. She began working on the second, a novel, in 2012.

=== Other work ===
Hardy started a left-wing political apparel brand with designer Sara-Jane Chase called Polichicks in 2003.

As of October 2008, Hardy became a committed vegan after completing a one-week challenge set by her Triple J co-presenter Lindsay McDougall.

Since 2010, Hardy and writer Michaela McGuire have co-hosted the popular international literary public event "Women of Letters", in which five or six women read letters they have written on a set theme.

In October 2010, an article on the Liberal Party politician Christopher Pyne written by Hardy on the ABC The Drum blog site was withdrawn on the grounds that it "failed to meet the standards for argument and well-thought opinion". A public apology was issued to Pyne by The Drum editor "for both the attack and for its deeply personal nature".

In August 2017, it was announced that Hardy would join the annual Melbourne Writers Festival as the event's Artistic Director. She resigned from her three-year contract, with effect December 2019.

== Filmography ==
=== Film appearances ===
Year	Title	Role	Notes	Ref
1988	Two Brothers Running	School Child		
1997	True Love and Chaos	Out of it Woman		
1998	Denial	Michelle	Short	

=== Television appearances ===
Year	Title	Role	Notes	Ref.
2010	Talkin' 'Bout Your Generation	Herself / Contestant	Episode: #2.5	
2002	Short Cuts	Josephine Coxon	2 episodes	
1998	Thunderstone	Sophie	1 episode	
1998	Stingers	Lara Kelly	"Jelly Babies" (#1.9)	
1998	Raw FM	Lucina	"Raw'n'Sore" (#1.8)	
1995–2003	Neighbours	Rhonda Brumby	5 episodes	
1994	A Country Practice	Yesterday Hubble	"Over The Edge" (#1.23)	
1993	The Late Show	Passer-by in "Kelvin, Son of Melvin, Son of Alvin"	Uncredited (#2.17)	
1993-94	R.F.D.S	Zoe Solomon	13 episodes	
1987	The Henderson Kids II	Sally Marshall	24 episodes	

=== Production credits ===
Year	Title	Role	Notes	Ref
1992	All Together Now	Writer	1 episode	
1996	Ocean Girl	Script assistant	14 episodes	
1999	Thunderstone	Writer	3 episodes	
2000	Blue Heelers	Writer	1 episode	
2001	Horace and Tina	Writer	1 episode	
2001	Something in the Air	Writer	4 episodes	
2001	Wild Kat	Writer	2 episodes	
2001	McLeod's Daughters	Writer	"Playing to Win" (#1.16)	
2002	Short Cuts	Series writer	22 episodes	
1995–2003	Neighbours	Writer	37 episodes	
2002-03	Always Greener	Writer	4 episodes	
2003	The Sleepover Club	Writer	Various episodes	
2005	Last Man Standing	Series writer and producer	22 episodes	
2007	Marx and Venus	Writer	Unknown episodes	
2010	Spirited	Writer	"Cats in the Cradle" (#1.6)	
2011–2012	Laid	Co-creator, series writer and co-producer	12 episodes	
2013	Mr & Mrs Murder	Writer	"En Vogue" (#1.3)	
2008–2011	Packed to the Rafters	Series writer	15 episodes	
2013-15	Wonderland	Writer	5 episodes	
2016	Family Law	Writer	2 episodes	
2017	Hoges	Writer	1 episode	
2017	Seven Types of Ambiguity	Writer	1 episode	
2016-18	Nowhere Boys	Writer	5 episodes	
2017	Growing Up Gracefully	Script editor	6 episodes	
2021	Metro Sexual	Consultant	6 episodes	
2021	Rosehaven	Script Producer	8 episodes	
2022	Barons	Writer	1 episode	
2023	Erotic Stories	Writer	1 episode ("Come As You Are")	
2023	Paper Dolls	Writer	1 episode	
2022-24	Heartbreak High	Writer	2 episodes	
2024	Laid	Writer / Producer	8 episodes (US Remake)	
2025	Sunny Nights	Writer	2025	

== Bibliography ==
=== Children's fiction ===
- Short Cuts, Angus & Robertson, 2002

=== Humour ===
- You'll be Sorry When I'm Dead, Allen & Unwin, 2011

=== Play ===
- No Pay? No Way!, Sydney Theatre Company, 2020
- Losing Face, Melbourne Theatre Company, 2025
