= 2005 in Australian television =

== Events ==
- 8 January – Australia Unites: Reach Out To Asia raises $20 million for the 2004 Indian Ocean Tsunami relief effort. It is also the first time that Australia's three major commercial television stations have co-operated to broadcast such an event.
- 31 January – ABC starts its new afternoon wrapper programme named off its children's website called RollerCoaster with host Elliot Spencer.
- 3 February – American science fiction drama series Lost premieres on the Seven Network.
- 12 February – Australia's Funniest Home Video Show returns and starts 2005 when AFHVS became Australia's Funniest Home Videos with a funky major revamp, a monster-revamped funky instrumental theme music and a relocation from Melbourne back to Sydney. This is the very first episode to be filmed at Nine's Sydney studios since 1999.
- 22 February – In The Price Is Right, contestant Joanne Segeviano won a record-breaking mega showcase of A$664,667 (about US$406,274.45), setting a record of becoming the largest winner in the show's franchise worldwide that would held on for exactly three years, until it was surpassed by Adam Rose's total of US1,153,908 (approximately A$1.5 million).
- 7 March – ABC launches a brand new digital channel ABC2.
- 13 April – The Seven Network's Melbourne headquarters suffer a 30-minute blackout, causing the network to be knocked off air nationwide. This resulted in Blue Heelers being interrupted in the midst of a four-part storyline; this episode is repeated the following week in all markets except Perth (where, due to the time difference, it was Home and Away which was interrupted).
- 26 April – The Great Outdoors host Tom Williams and his partner Kym Johnson win the second season of Dancing with the Stars.
- 1 May – Rove McManus wins the 2005 TV WEEK Gold Logie.
- 15 May – Random wins the first season of The X Factor, based on the British namesake singing competition, making them the first-ever group to win the show since the franchise's debut in 2004. Despite the cancellation following the first season, the series returned after a five-year hiatus that would air for seven more seasons until 2016.
- 25 May – Graham Kennedy dies at age 71. The network on which most of his shows aired, the Nine Network, passes up the offer to broadcast his funeral but Seven axes Nine's coverage, picks it up and wins it. Nine does eventually show parts of the funeral live.
- 30 May – The Australian game show Temptation premieres on the Nine Network.
- June – Deal or No Deal host Andrew O'Keefe replaces Chris Reason as co-host when the title Sunday Sunrise became Weekend Sunrise.
- 26 June – Douglas Wood is interviewed by Sandra Sully about his time as a captive after Network Ten pays a reported $400,000 for an exclusive interview.
- 22 July – Hi-5 airs its 300th episode.
- 15 August – Big Brother: Greg Mathew, along with twin brother David Mathew, also known as "The Logan Twins", is announced the winner of the fifth series.
- 20 August – Cheez TV ends after 10-year run with Jade Gatt and Ryan Lappin and it will be replaced by a new weekday morning children's cartoon programme Toasted TV.
- 22 August – Network Ten debuts another weekday morning children's cartoon programme called Toasted TV presented by Pip Russell and Dan Sweetman replacing Cheez TV.
- 25 August – After a one-year hiatus, The Mole returns to Australian television for its fifth season, hosted by Tom Williams after its original host Grant Bowler was unavailable due to a prior commitment.
- 22 September – The final episode of Australian medical drama series MDA airs on ABC.
- 17 October – Rob "Coach" Fulton, a resident from Sydney, becomes the first ever person to win $1 million on Who Wants to Be a Millionaire?. Just four episodes later, another resident from Sydney, Martin Flood, became the second and final person won the top prize, amid allegations of cheating.
- 27 October – Liz Cantor wins the fifth season of The Mole, taking home $203,000 in prize money. John Whitehall is revealed as the Mole, and Craig Murrell is the runner-up. Cantor would later embark on a role with Channel Seven in Brisbane as its fill-in weather presenter.
- 8 November – Home and Away actress Ada Nicodemou and her partner Aric Yegudkin win the third season of Dancing with the Stars.
- 18 November – It is announced on Sunrise that Wheel of Fortune would return to Channel Seven, with Larry Emdur & Laura Csortan as hosts.
- 21 November – Kate DeAraugo wins the third season of Australian Idol.
- 24 November – The very last episode of The Price Is Right goes to air on the Nine Network after a five-year run then a two-year run. The show was axed due to the strong competitions of rival Seven Network game show Deal or No Deal. This was host Larry Emdur's final appearance on Nine, before returning to the Seven Network, where he remains to this day.
- 27 November – American science fiction fantasy series Smallville switches over to airing on Network Ten following disappointing ratings on Nine.
- 30 November – American animated science fiction sitcom Futurama created by Matt Groening the creator of The Simpsons switches over to airing Network Ten and in doing so would join The Simpsons as part of its "Happy Hour" block, airing every Wednesday night. The show became a major hit for the network, with some episodes drawing 1.1 million viewers and occasionally outrating The Simpsons.
- 2 December – A Current Affair again draws with a final goodbye with Ray Martin in the hot-seat before semi-retiring for the very last time. As the program is rested for six weeks to try out a major reliable revamp, he is definitely to be replaced by Tracy Grimshaw from 2006 onwards. Grimshaw quits the Today show after 9 years as co-host. She will be replaced by former-Ten News anchor Jessica Rowe effective from 30 January 2006, then soon axed due to poor ratings. ACA returned on 30 January 2006.
- 15 December – American animated sitcom American Dad! debuts on the Seven Network.
- 16 December – Good Morning Australia ends with a final goodbye after a 14-year run on Network Ten from the studios of ATV-10 first out of Nunawading in 1992, then from Como Centre, South Yarra from 1993 onwards. Host Bert Newton leaves Channel Ten and signs up and returns to Nine Network to host game show Bert's Family Feud. The following year, Good Morning Australia time slot was replaced by 9am with David and Kim hosted by former Getaway reporter David Reyne and former National Nine News/Nightline presenter, Kim Watkins who both moved from the Nine Network to Channel Ten.

=== New channels ===
- 7 March – ABC2
- 5 December – Playhouse Disney

== Debuts ==
Program	Channel	Debut date
RocKwiz	SBS	31 January
RollerCoaster	ABC	31 January
Medical Emergency	Seven Network	February
Aussie Queer Eye for the Straight Guy	Network Ten	9 February
Spicks and Specks	ABC	9 February
Streetsmartz	Nine Network	4 March
Blue Water High	ABC	11 May
Temptation	Nine Network	30 May
The Adventures of Bottle Top Bill and His Best Friend Corky	ABC	1 June
Last Man Standing	Seven Network	6 June
Outback House	ABC	12 June
Toasted TV	Network Ten	22 August
Holly's Heroes	Nine Network	16 September
Australian Princess	Network Ten	5 October
20 to 1	Nine Network	13 October
The Surgeon	Network Ten	13 October
The Ronnie Johns Half Hour	Network Ten	October
Speaking in Tongues	SBS	7 November
headLand	Seven Network	15 November
Larry Emdur & Laura Csortan's Wheel of Fortune	Seven Network	5 December
Lonely Planet Six Degrees	SBS	17 December
Eclipse Music TV	Seven Network	2005
Ready Steady Cook	Network Ten	2005

=== Subscription television ===
Program	Channel	Debut date
Australia's Next Top Model	FOX8	11 January
Camp Orange	Nickelodeon	18 February

== New international programming ==
Program	Channel	Debut date
(United Kingdom) Altered Statesman	ABC TV	3 January
(United States) Dave the Barbarian	Seven Network	8 January
(Canada) Poko	ABC TV	24 January
(United States) ChalkZone	ABC TV	24 January
(United States) CSI: NY	Nine Network	25 January
(United States) Desperate Housewives	Seven Network	31 January
(Scotland) Shoebox Zoo	ABC TV	1 February
(United States) Medium	Network Ten	2 February
(United States) Lost	Seven Network	3 February
(United States) Ozzy & Drix	Nine Network	6 February
(United Kingdom) Shameless	SBS	7 February
(United Kingdom) I Dream	ABC TV	7 February
(Italy) Winx Club	Network Ten	7 February
(France) / (Canada) Totally Spies!	Network Ten	7 February
(United States) Oobi	ABC TV	8 February
(United Kingdom) Funky Valley	ABC TV	8 February
(Japan) SD Gundam Force	Network Ten	10 February
(Canada) Dragon Booster	ABC TV	24 February
(United Kingdom) Little Red Tractor	Nine Network	5 March
(United Kingdom) Agatha Christie's Marple	ABC TV	6 March
(United Kingdom) / (New Zealand) The Tribe	ABC2	7 March
(United States) / (France) / (Republic of Ireland) / (India) / (Canada) ToddWorld	ABC TV	16 March
(United Kingdom) Nighty Night	ABC TV	23 March
(United States) Baby Looney Tunes	Nine Network	2 April
(Canada) Dragon	ABC TV	4 April
(France) / (Canada) Tupu	ABC TV	11 April
(United States) Brandy & Mr. Whiskers	Seven Network	16 April
(Wales) Fireman Sam (2003)	ABC TV	20 April
So Frenchy, So Chic	SBS	23 April
(United Kingdom) Christopher Crocodile	ABC2	26 April
(Australia) / (Canada) / (United Kingdom) Faireez	Network Ten	29 April
(Germany) / (France) The Hydronauts	ABC TV	2 May
(United Kingdom) I am Not an Animal	ABC TV	4 May
(France) Flatmania	ABC TV	12 May
(United Kingdom) Barney	ABC2	18 May
(United Kingdom) Doctor Who (2005)	ABC TV	21 May
(United States) Star Wars: Clone Wars	Network Ten	26 May
(Japan) Mega Man NT Warrior	Network Ten	30 May
(United Kingdom) Bronski and Bernstein	SBS	2 June
(Norway) / (Sweden) Sophie's World	SBS	24 June
(United States) Taken	Nine Network	5 July
(United Kingdom) BB3B	ABC TV	8 July
(United States) American Dragon: Jake Long	Seven Network	16 July
(United States) Hot Wheels AcceleRacers	Network Ten	30 July
(United Kingdom) Gordon the Garden Gnome	ABC TV	8 August
(Canada) Being Ian	ABC TV	10 August
(United States) / (Denmark) Trollz	Network Ten	25 August
(United Kingdom) Spitfire Ace	ABC TV	1 September
(Japan) Transformers: Cybertron	Network Ten	3 September
(United Kingdom) Bob the Builder: Project Build It	ABC TV	13 September
(Japan) Ghost in the Shell: Stand Alone Complex	SBS	15 September
(Japan) Battle B-Daman	Seven Network	18 September
(United States) Grey's Anatomy	Seven Network	26 September
(United States) Global Grover	ABC TV	3 October
(United Kingdom) Charlie and Lola	ABC TV	3 October
(United Kingdom) Planet Cook	ABC TV	3 October
(United Kingdom) / (Canada) Planet Sketch	ABC TV	7 October
(Italy) / (Germany) / (France) W.I.T.C.H.	Seven Network	9 October
(United States) / (Japan) Super Robot Monkey Team Hyperforce Go!	Seven Network	9 October
(United Kingdom) Fifi and the Flowertots	ABC TV	20 October
(United States) Pet Alien	Network Ten	22 October
(United Kingdom) Pitt & Kantrop	ABC TV	31 October
(Spain) / (United Kingdom) Pocoyo	ABC TV	8 November
(France) / (Germany) Lazy Lucy	ABC TV	9 November
(United Kingdom) The F***ing Fulfords	ABC TV	10 November
(United States) Ghost Whisperer	Seven Network	29 November
(United Kingdom) Bromwell High	ABC TV	30 November
(United Kingdom) King Arthur's Disasters	ABC TV	15 December
(United States) American Dad!	Seven Network	15 December
(United Kingdom) Bertha	ABC2	15 December
(United States) Psychic Detectives	Nine Network	2005
(United States) The Benefactor	Seven Network	2005
(United Kingdom) Ebb and Flo	ABC TV	2005
(Canada) Mentors	ABC TV	2005

=== Subscription television ===
Program	Channel	Debut date
(United States) American Casino	Discovery Channel	3 January
(United States) Brandy & Mr. Whiskers	Disney Channel	3 January
(United Kingdom) Don't Drop the Coffin	The LifeStyle Channel	3 January
(United States) Unfabulous	Nickelodeon	31 January
(United Kingdom) Making Spaces	The LifeStyle Channel	1 February
(United Kingdom) Property Ladder	The LifeStyle Channel	2 February
(United States) Blue's Room	Nickelodeon/Nick Jr	March
(United Kingdom) Ramsay's Kitchen Nightmares	The LifeStyle Channel	9 March
(United States) Love Is in the Heir	E!	21 March
(United States) The Gastineau Girls	E!	April 2005
(United States) The Suite Life of Zack & Cody	Disney Channel	15 April 2005
(United Kingdom) Green Wing	UKTV	June
(United States) Meet the Barkers	MTV	16 June 2005
(United States) Meet Diego!	Nick Jr	July/August
(United States) Zoey 101	Nickelodeon	July/August
(United States) Pet Alien	Cartoon Network	25 July
(United States) Hogan Knows Best	VH1	12 August 2005
(United States) Rescue Me	Fox8	26 September
(United States) Breaking Bonaduce	VH1	October 2005
(Japan) One Piece	Cartoon Network	2005

== Programming changes ==
=== Changes to network affiliations ===
This is a list of programs which made their premiere on an Australian television network that had previously premiered on another Australian television network. The networks involved the switch of allegiances are predominantly both free-to-air networks or both subscription television networks. Programs have their free-to-air/subscription television premiere, after previously premiering on the platform (free-to-air to subscription/subscription to free-to-air). are not included. In some cases, programs may still air on the original television network. This occurs predominantly with programs shared between subscription television networks.

==== Domestic ====
Program	New Network	Previous Network	Date
Bambaloo	ABC TV	Seven Network	11 July

==== International ====
Program	New Network	Previous Network	Date
(United Kingdom) Engie Benjy	ABC2	ABC Kids (now defunct)	7 March
(United Kingdom) Boohbah	ABC2	ABC TV	7 March
(United States) Play with Me Sesame	ABC2	ABC TV	7 March
(Canada) / (France) Inuk	ABC2	ABC Kids (now defunct)	7 March
(Wales) / (United Kingdom) Starhill Ponies	ABC2	ABC Kids (now defunct)	7 March
(United Kingdom) Bob the Builder	ABC2	ABC Kids (now defunct)	7 March
(United States) Batfink	ABC2	ABC Kids (now defunct)	12 March
(United Kingdom) Molly's Gang	ABC2	ABC Kids (now defunct)	1 April
(United Kingdom) The Wombles (1996)	ABC2	ABC Kids (now defunct)	12 April
(United States) Angel	Network Ten	Seven Network	29 April
(United Kingdom) Spider!	ABC2	ABC TV	1 June
(United States) / (Canada) The Little Lulu Show	ABC2	ABC TV/ABC Kids (now defunct)	28 June
(United States) Sex and the City	Network Ten	Nine Network	8 August
(United States) / (Canada) Dragon Tales	Cartoon Network	Fox Kids	14 November
(United States) Smallville	Network Ten	Nine Network	27 November
(United States) Futurama	Network Ten	Seven Network	30 November
(United Kingdom) The Human Body	Network Ten	ABC TV	3 December

==== Free-to-air premieres ====
This is a list of programs which made their premiere on Australian free-to-air television that had previously premiered on Australian subscription television. Programs may still air on the original subscription television network.

=== International ===
Program	Free-to-air network	Subscription network	Date
(United States) MythBusters	SBS TV	Discovery Channel	3 January

==== Subscription premieres ====
This is a list of programs which made their premiere on Australian subscription television that had previously premiered on Australian free-to-air television. Programs may still air on the original free-to-air television network.

=== International ===
Program	Subscription network	Free-to-air network	Date
(United States) What I Like About You	Nickelodeon	Nine Network	31 January
(United States) She-Ra: Princess of Power	Cartoon Network	Seven Network	31 October
(United Kingdom) Bob the Builder	Disney Channel	ABC TV	2005

== Specials ==
Program	Channel	Debut date
(United States) Winnie the Pooh: Springtime with Roo (Repeat)	Seven Network	27 March
(United States) 2005 Kids' Choice Awards	Nickelodeon	23 April
(United States) Pooh's Heffalump Halloween Movie	Seven Network	31 October

== Television shows ==
=== 1960s ===
- Four Corners (1961–present)

=== 2000s ===
2001

- Big Brother (2001–2008, 2012–2014)
- All Aussie Adventures (2001–2002, 2017)

2002

- Kath & Kim (2002–2007)

2003

- Australian Idol (2003–2009)
- Deal or No Deal (2003–2013)

2004

- Border Security: Australia's Front Line (2004–present)
- Dancing with the Stars (2004–present)

== Ending / resting this year ==
Date	Show	Channel	Debut
January 2005	Wheel of Fortune (Wheel of Fortune will not be reinstated on Channel Seven until December 2005 with a major-revamped set and the theme music and font remained)	Seven Network	1981
13 January	The Cooks	Network Ten	18 October 2004
23 February 2005	Aussie Queer Eye for the Straight Guy	Network Ten	9 February 2005
6 May	The Big Arvo	Seven Network	1 February 2001
13 May 2005	Our Place	Nine Network	8 April 2005
29 May 2005	Celebrity Circus	Nine Network	1 May 2005
29 May	My Restaurant Rules	Seven Network	15 February 2004
5 June 2005	Let Loose Live	Seven Network	29 May 2005
22 July 2005	Scooter: Secret Agent	Network Ten	28 January 2005
31 July 2005	Outback House	ABC	12 June 2005
20 August	Cheez TV	Network Ten	10 July 1995
31 August 2005	We Can Be Heroes: Finding The Australian of the Year	ABC	27 July 2005
22 September	MDA	ABC	23 July 2002
October 2005	The Alice	Nine Network	28 September 2005
25 October 2005	Last Man Standing	Seven Network	6 June 2005
28 October	The Mole	Seven Network	27 February 2000
18 November	Strictly Dancing	ABC	13 February 2004
24 November	The Price Is Right	Nine Network	23 June 2003
1 December 2005	The Surgeon	Network Ten	13 October 2005
4 December	7 Days	ABC	4 August 2001
9 December 2005	The New Tomorrow	Seven Network	17 September 2005
16 December	GMA with Bert Newton	Network Ten	1991
28 December	The Secret Life of Us	Network Ten	16 July 2001
2005	Aerobics Oz Style	Network Ten	1982

== Miniseries ==
=== International ===
Miniseries	Network	Airdate(s)
(United Kingdom) North and South	ABC TV	8, 15, 22, 29 May

== See also ==
- 2005 in Australia
- List of Australian films of 2005
