= Queer Eye =

Queer Eye is a television franchise based upon a team of gay professionals (the "Fab 5") giving lifestyle and fashion makeovers to guests.

Queer Eye may refer to:

- Queer Eye (2003 TV series), an American reality television series on Bravo, known originally as Queer Eye for the Straight Guy
- Queer Eye for the Straight Girl (2005), a women-focused spin-off of the 2003 series
- One of a number of international adaptations of Queer Eye:
  - Aussie Queer Eye for the Straight Guy (Australia)
  - FAB 5 (Greece)
- Queer Eye (2018 TV series), a Netflix reboot series

== See also ==
- Queer Eyes, Full Hearts, a 2014 episode of Modern Family
