= 2005 in Australia =

- Monarch: Elizabeth II
- Governor-General: Michael Jeffery
- Prime minister: John Howard
- Population: 20,328,609
- Elections: WA, NT

The following lists events that happened during 2005 in Australia.

- Decades: 1980s; 1990s; 2000s; 2010s; 2020s
- See also: 2005 in Australian television; 2005 in Australian literature; Other events of 2005; Timeline of Australian history

== Incumbents ==
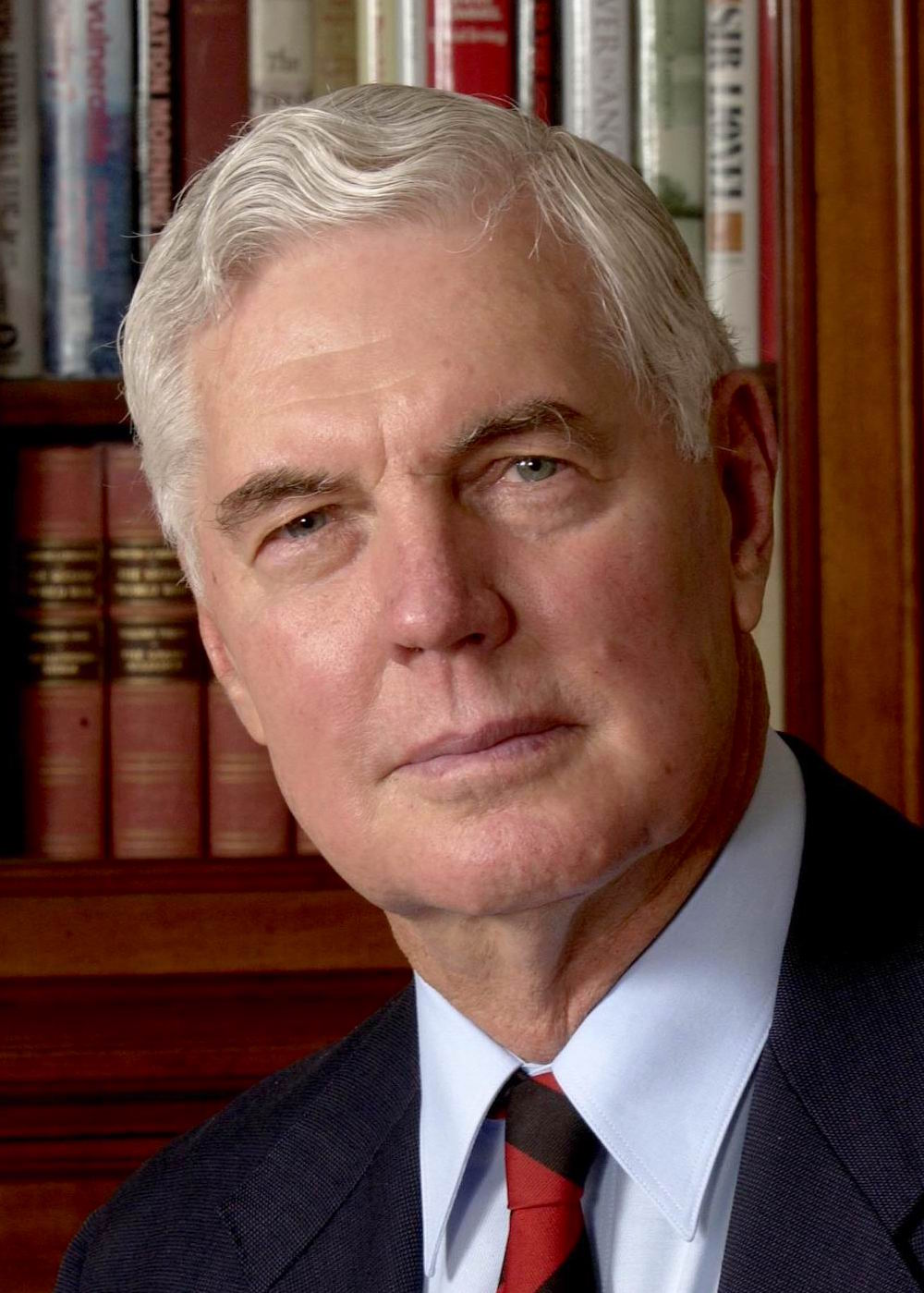
Michael Jeffery

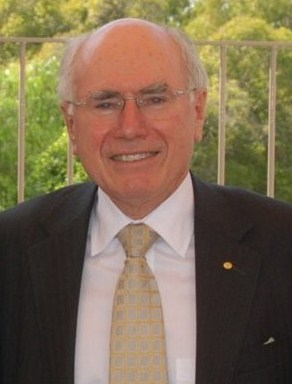
John Howard

- Monarch – Elizabeth II
- Governor-General – Michael Jeffery
- Prime Minister – John Howard
  - Deputy Prime Minister – John Anderson (until 6 July), then Mark Vaile
  - Opposition Leader – Mark Latham (until 18 January), then Kim Beazley
- Chief Justice – Murray Gleeson

=== State and territory leaders ===
- Premier of New South Wales – Bob Carr (until 3 August), then Morris Iemma
  - Opposition Leader – John Brogden (until 1 September), then Peter Debnam
- Premier of Queensland – Peter Beattie
  - Opposition Leader – Lawrence Springborg
- Premier of South Australia – Mike Rann
  - Opposition Leader – Rob Kerin
- Premier of Tasmania – Paul Lennon
  - Opposition Leader – Rene Hidding
- Premier of Victoria – Steve Bracks
  - Opposition Leader – Robert Doyle
- Premier of Western Australia – Geoff Gallop
  - Opposition Leader – Colin Barnett (until 9 March), then Matt Birney
- Chief Minister of the Australian Capital Territory – Jon Stanhope
  - Opposition Leader – Brendan Smyth
- Chief Minister of the Northern Territory – Clare Martin
  - Opposition Leader – Terry Mills (until 4 February), then Denis Burke (until 17 June), then Jodeen Carney
- Chief Minister of Norfolk Island – Geoffrey Gardner

=== Governors and administrators ===
- Governor of New South Wales – Marie Bashir
- Governor of Queensland – Quentin Bryce
- Governor of South Australia – Marjorie Jackson-Nelson
- Governor of Tasmania – William Cox
- Governor of Victoria – John Landy
- Governor of Western Australia – John Sanderson (until 31 October)
- Administrator of the Australian Indian Ocean Territories – Evan Williams (until 31 October)
- Administrator of Norfolk Island – Grant Tambling
- Administrator of the Northern Territory – Ted Egan

== Events ==
=== January ===
- 3 January – The Clean Ocean Foundation bans Victorian Premier Steve Bracks from Gunnamatta Beach over delays to upgrade a treatment plant that is allowing effluent to be dumped at sea.
- 6 January –
  - Australia becomes the single biggest aid donor to Indonesia, promising $1 billion to rebuild tsunami devastated regions, such as India, the Maldives, Sri Lanka and Thailand.
  - Federal Labor Leader Mark Latham has another bout of pancreatitis.
- 8 January – Australian government pledged $20 million for tsunami relief effort in South and Southeast Asia.
- 9 January – Australian Prime Minister John Howard addresses the nation to thank police, volunteers and defence personnel working to helping rebuild the region devastated by the 2004 Indonesian tsunami.
- 11 January – Nine people are killed in bushfires in South Australia, making them the worst fires seen in Australia since Ash Wednesday, and until the Black Saturday bushfires in February 2009.
- 17 January – West Australian Premier Geoff Gallop and the State Government decide to support a yes-yes vote in a referendum favouring extended late night and Sunday trading.
- 18 January – Mark Latham quits as Federal Opposition Leader, resigns his seat in Parliament.
- 28 January – The Australian Labor Party leadership spill, 2005 takes place. Kim Beazley is the only contender and is elected unopposed as leader of the Federal Labor Party and of the Federal Opposition.

=== February ===
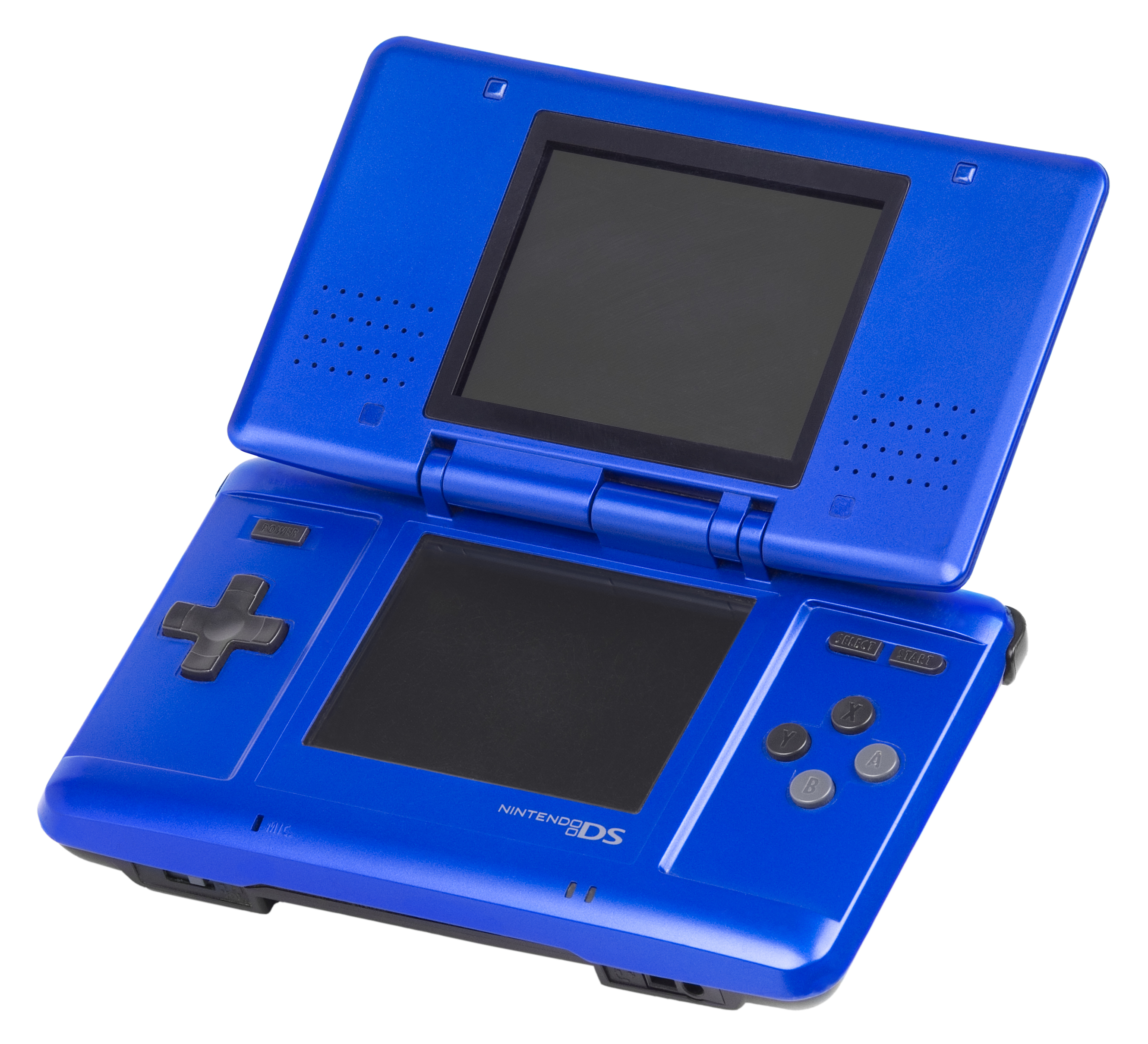
February 24: The release of the Nintendo DS in Australia

- 8 February –
  - Immigration Minister Amanda Vanstone announces a closed inquiry to be headed by former AFP commissioner Mick Palmer, to investigate how Cornelia Rau came to be held in solitary confinement at Baxter Detention Centre and why she did not receive treatment despite having schizophrenia.
  - Queensland Senator Santo Santoro raises the issue of abortion at the Coalition Party Room meeting in Canberra by circulating a policy paper with recommendations aimed at reducing the number of abortions, such as a Medicare-funded ultrasound for women contemplating an abortion, along with some Medicare-funded counselling.
- 9 February – Queensland Premier Peter Beattie releases an edited transcript of an interview between Cornelia Rau and officers at the Brisbane Women's Correctional Centre on 5 July 2003.
- 10 February –
  - Queensland Premier Peter Beattie apologises for the failure of his agencies to properly care for Cornelia Rau.
  - Local Government Minister Jim Lloyd denies allegations that his office was involved in a conspiracy to defraud the Commonwealth over a one-and-a-half million dollar grant to dredge the Tumbi Creek on the New South Wales central coast.
- 11 February – Immigration Minister Amanda Vanstone admits that criminals who have finished their prison sentences and are awaiting deportation are being held among asylum seekers at the Baxter Detention Centre.
- 13 February – Federal Treasurer Peter Costello breaks ranks with Prime Minister John Howard and says he and the government are sorry for the way Cornelia Rau was treated.
- 19 February – Prime Minister John Howard and New Zealand Prime Minister Helen Clark meet for talks.
- 21 February – Health Minister Tony Abbott is reunited with what he believes to be his son, who was given up for adoption as a baby.
- 24 February - the Nintendo DS is released in Australia.
- 25 February – Parts of the Sydney suburb of Macquarie Fields erupt into rioting following the death of a 19-year-old in a police pursuit.
- 26 February – The ALP government of Geoff Gallop is re-elected in Western Australia for a second term.
- 27 February – Immigration Minister Amanda Vanstone announces an extension of the Rau inquiry from original date of 24 March. Neil Comrie, the former Victorian Police Commissioner, is recruited to help Mick Palmer in the inquiry investigations.

=== March ===
- 9 March – Immigration Minister Amanda Vanstone rejects the findings of a Senate report regarding the replacement of the Aboriginal and Torres Strait Islander Commission (ATSIC).
- 17 March – News Limited newspapers report that Liberal Senator Ross Lightfoot, while on a parliamentary tour to Iraq, smuggled US$20,000 into the country on behalf of Woodside Petroleum as a donation for the Kurdish government, having been issued with a pistol for personal security. The newspapers published photographs of Mr. Lightfoot appearing with Kurdish militants wielding an AK-47. Mr. Lightfoot strenuously denies the allegations and threatens legal action against the newspapers carrying the story.
- 18 March – Prime Minister John Howard admits that Liberal Senator Ross Lightfoot has changed his story regarding the Cash for Kurds affair.
- 20 March –
  - Prime Minister John Howard confirms that some aspects of the Federal Government's immigration detention policies are under review.
  - Labor wins the seat of Werriwa.
- 21 March – Federal Government backbenchers, churches and the Family First Party lobby for the Federal Government to relax its refugee policy for Christian converts, but Prime Minister John Howard announces that no special treatment will be given.
- 22 March –
  - Stuart Copeland, the Queensland Shadow Minister for Health, raises the issue of Doctor Jayant Patel's clinical practice during Question Time in the Queensland Parliament. Copeland had been alerted to Patel's inadequacies by Toni Hoffman, a nurse at the Bundaberg Base Hospital.
  - Federal Health Minister Tony Abbott announces that his alleged long lost son is actually the son of another man, according to DNA testing.
- 24 March – Prime Minister John Howard puts state Labor governments on notice to cut taxes or else, giving them four weeks to comply.
- 25 March – Rob Messenger, the National Party Member of Parliament for Burnett, raises the matter of Doctor Jayant Patel in a speech to the Queensland Legislative Assembly. He calls for Patel's suspension.

=== April ===
- 2 April – The Shark 02 Royal Australian Navy Westland Sea King helicopter crashes off the coast of Nias, killing nine people.
- 9 April – Queensland Health Minister Gordon Nuttall announces an inquiry into patient safety at Bundaberg Base Hospital in the wake of the "Dr Death" controversy at the hospital.
- 11 April – Victorian Premier Steve Bracks unveils a plan to increase Melbourne's migration intake.
- 14 April – Queensland Premier Peter Beattie unveils plans to build a rail tunnel under the Brisbane River.
- 15 April – Prime Minister John Howard apologises for breaking his Medicare safety net election promise.
- 17 April –
  - The Bali Nine are arrested for drug smuggling in Indonesia
  - In Darwin, Prime Minister John Howard farewells troops bound for Iraq.
- 18 April - A fifteen-year-old known as "Tram Boy" allegedly stole a tram in Melbourne. Tram boy drove around on the network for 40 minutes before being stopped by police

=== May ===
- 1 May – Federal Treasurer Peter Costello warns of Liberal Party instability if John Howard does not hand over the Prime Ministership.
- 2 May – Douglas Wood is taken hostage in Iraq. He is later rescued on 15 June.
- 6 May – The scandal concerning the 2001 deportation the Philippines of Australian resident Vivian Solon first comes to light.
- 19 May – Prime Minister John Howard admits he has no proof that a Muslim cleric spoke to Douglas Wood.
- 23 May – The Morris Inquiry into the Queensland public hospital system (headed by Tony Morris QC) begins in Brisbane.
- 25 May – New South Wales Premier Bob Carr becomes the State's longest serving Premier.
- 26 May – National Sorry Day is renamed National Day of Healing.
- 27 May – Schapelle Corby convicted of drug smuggling by an Indonesian court, and sentenced to 20 years in prison (later reduced to 15 and then reverted to 20 years).

=== June ===
- 1 June –
  - The Indonesian embassy is subjected to a bioterrorism hoax.
  - Prime Minister John Howard stands by the Special Air Service Regiment against allegations in Time Magazine that Australian SAS soldiers killed innocent tribesmen in Afghanistan.
  - The Federal Government announces an independent audit of airport security.
- 3 June – The Council of Australian Governments (COAG) meeting between the State Premiers and the Prime Minister is held. The Premiers agree to disagree with the Prime Minister on industrial relations, but make a commitment to the establishment of a national system of apprenticeships to address the skills shortage.
- 8 June – Queensland Premier Peter Beattie announces approval for $60,000 in retrospective travel expenses for former Speaker Ray Hollis.
- 28 June – Three suspects in a 2002 gang rape in Hurstville finally arrested in dawn raids in New South Wales.
- 29 June – Rain brings drought relief and flooding across New South Wales.
  - New South Wales Supreme Court finds no evidence of neglect against Westmead Hospital in the Rhiannon Richards brain damage suit, leaving her family to pay both sides' legal costs.
  - New South Wales health authorities warn parents of an outbreak of whooping cough across the state, urging parents to immunise their children.
  - Former Federal Labor Opposition Leader, Mark Latham's autobiography is released, causing uproar in the Australian Labor Party.

=== July ===
- 1 July –
  - Controversial tax cuts, intended to boost family budgets, come into effect as the Federal Government officially takes control of the Senate.
  - A statewide two-hour teachers' strike takes place in New South Wales to protest proposed changes to Federal industrial relations laws.
- 14 July – Following the release of the Palmer Inquiry report, Prime Minister John Howard and Immigration Minister Amanda Vanstone apologise to Cornelia Rau, who was mistakenly held in detention for 10 months, and to Vivian Solon, who was deported to the Philippines. The 200-page report identified systemic weaknesses in the Department of Immigration which contributed to Ms Rau's detention, the failure to establish her identity, and to meet her mental health needs. The report says that those same mistakes were made in Vivian Solon's case.
- 23 July – Victorian Premier Steve Bracks outlines plans for a summit involving every regional mayor in Victoria, as well as announcing a new deal for a sustainable abalone industry.
- 26 July – Prime Minister John Howard meets with Iraqi Prime Minister Ibrahim Jaafari and was told that the Iraqi military no longer needs help from Australian troops as they begin to take over.
- 27 July – After ten years in power, Bob Carr resigns as Premier of New South Wales. He is replaced by Morris Iemma on 3 August.

=== August ===
- 21 August – Michelle Leslie is arrested in Bali after being found with two ecstasy pills in her handbag at an open-air dance party just outside Kuta. She is found guilty, and sentenced to three months in prison on 18 November, but is released on 20 November as she had already served her sentence.
- 29 August –
  - After describing Bob Carr's wife Helena as a "mail-order bride", NSW Opposition Leader John Brogden resigns. He attempts suicide on 30 August.
  - Prime Minister John Howard supports the right of Muslim girls to wear headdresses to school.

=== September ===
- 5 September – Prime Minister John Howard rejects calls to sack Health Minister Tony Abbott over his insensitive remarks in relation to the suicide attempt by John Brogden.
- 14 September – In New York City, at the biggest gathering of world leaders at the United Nations 2005 World Summit, Prime Minister John Howard announces that Australia will double its overseas aid donations to $4 billion per year, within five years.
- 17 September – Prime Minister John Howard delivers a rebuke to the United Nations during an address to world leaders.
- 28 September – Prime Minister John Howard meets oil company leaders over the use of biofuels.

=== October ===
- 5 October – The Opposition accused Queensland Premier Peter Beattie of covering up a letter from the Health Commissioner asking for a new inquiry into the health crisis.
- 12 October – The Bali Memorial, Melbourne commemorating the victims of the 2002 Bali bombings is officially opened.
- 31 October – Federal Opposition Leader Kim Beazley commits the Federal Labor Party to supporting the Government's anti-terror laws.

=== November ===
- 4 November –
  - The Federal Opposition accuses Federal Health Minister Tony Abbott of failing to act on a report urging the wider use of a class of drugs which lower cholesterol and reduce the risk of strokes and heart attacks.
  - The Federal Government decides not to list the Aboriginal Tent Embassy on the Commonwealth Heritage Register despite a recommendation from the Australian Heritage Council to do so.
- 12 November – Prime Minister John Howard tells Australia's Islamic community that it is their duty to turn in anyone it believes to be an extremist.
- 17 November – Prime Minister John Howard is named in a video tape of the latest threat by Asia's most wanted terrorist.
- 27 November – At the Commonwealth Heads of Government Meeting (CHOGM) in Malta, Prime Minister John Howard makes a final plea to Singapore to spare the life of heroin trafficker, Van Nguyen, and makes it clear that Australians may resent Singapore if the hanging proceeds.
- 29 November – Prime Minister John Howard confirms that he will allow Coalition MPs to take part in conscience vote on whether to legalise the use of controversial abortion pill RU-486.

=== December ===
- 2 December –
  - Van Tuong Nguyen is hanged in Singapore for drug offences. He is the first Australian to be executed since 1993.
  - The Federal Government's sweeping industrial relations changes are endorsed by the Senate, along party lines, after a marathon sitting.
- 11–12 December – The 2005 Cronulla riots take place, with the rioting centred on Cronulla and other beachside suburbs. There is also rioting in the Western Sydney area of Sydney. Attacks on people of Middle Eastern appearance are also reported in Perth and Adelaide.
- 15 December – A Senate inquiry into the abortion drug RU-486 begins and the inquiry is told that Viagra is more dangerous than RU-486.
- 31 December – Sections of the Trans-Australian Railway near Nurina on the Nullarbor Plain are washed away by flooding, halting passenger and freight services for up to five days.

=== Date unknown ===
- Yodel Australia, online advertising and internet marketing company is founded.

== Arts and literature ==
- Andrew McGahan's novel The White Earth wins the Miles Franklin Award.
- Gail Jones is awarded the Australian Literature Society Gold Medal for Sixty Lights.
- Tim Winton's short-story collection The Turning wins the Christina Stead Prize for fiction.
- Sonya Hartnett's novel Surrender wins the Vance Palmer Prize for Fiction.

== Film ==
- 13 October – The Australian government passes a bill granting film directors a share of the copyright in their films.
- 26 November – Look Both Ways wins best film at the Australian Film Institute Awards 2005.
- Little Fish
- Wolf Creek

== Television ==
- 8 January – Australia Unites: Reach Out To Asia raises $20 million for the 2004 Asian tsunami relief effort. It is also the first time that Australia's three major commercial television stations have co-operated to broadcast such an event.
- 25 May – Graham Kennedy dies at age 71. The network on which most of his shows aired, the Nine Network, passes up the offer to broadcast his funeral & the Seven Network arrives, axes Nine's coverage and Seven picks it up and wins it. Nine does eventually show parts of the funeral live.
- 26 June – Douglas Wood is interviewed by Sandra Sully about his time as a captive after Network Ten pays a reported $400,000 for an exclusive interview.
- 15 August: Big Brother: Greg Mathew, along with twin brother David Mathew, also known as "The Logan Twins", is announced the winner of the fifth series.
- 20 November – Madonna's Warner Bros. single "Hung Up" defeats Gold Digger by Kanye West and Jamie Foxx to be crowned the title of the ARIA single debuting at No. 1. This was the last Top 50 ARIA charts on ABC TV's Rage to be shown on the Seven Network. Only Seven Local TV and ABC TV will continue the Rage's Top 50 Charts until the end of July 2006, when it launches jtv.
- 16 December: Good Morning Australia finishes its 12-year run on Network Ten from the studios of ATV-10. Host Bert Newton leaves Ten and signs with the Nine Network to host the game show Bert's Family Feud.

== Sport ==
- 4 March – First day of the Australian Track & Field Championships for the 2004–2005 season, which are held at the Sydney Olympic Park in Homebush Bay. The 10,000 metres (men and women) were conducted at the Zatopek Meet in Melbourne, Victoria on Saturday 4 December 2004. The relays were conducted at Canberra on Sunday 6 February 2005.
- 6 March – Giancarlo Fisichella wins the Australian Grand Prix in his first race for Renault F1 at Albert Park.
- 19 March – Sydney Kings defeat Wollongong Hawks 112–85 in Game 3 of a series sweep in the NBL Grand Final series. The win completed the only three-peat in league history.
- 3 April – Suzuki rider Troy Corser takes both race victories in front of his home crowd, Phillip Island at the Superbike World Championship round.
- 3 July – Brett Cartwright wins the men's national marathon title, clocking 2:18:16 in Brisbane, while Jackie Fairweather claims the women's title in 2:34:34.
- 26 August – The inaugural A-League national football (soccer) season begins. In the first game, Adelaide United FC defeat the Newcastle United Jets 1–0 at EnergyAustralia Stadium in front of 13,000 people.
- 3 September – The Melbourne Phoenix defeat the Sydney Swifts 61–44 in the Commonwealth Bank Trophy netball grand final.
- 4 September – The Parramatta Eels win their most recent minor premiership following the conclusion of the final main round of the 2005 NRL season. The Newcastle Knights finish in last position, claiming the wooden spoon.
- 12 September – Cricket: England wins The Ashes back from Australia for the first time since 1987 in The 2005 Ashes series
- 24 September – The Sydney Swans (8.10.58) defeat the West Coast Eagles (7.12.54) to win the 109th VFL/AFL premiership. It is the first flag for the Swans in 72 years.
- 2 October – The Wests Tigers defeat the North Queensland Cowboys 30–16 to win the 2005 NRL grand final. It was the first finals series for the Wests Tigers and, to date, the only premiership win for the merged club.
- 2 October – With heavy rain cancelling the second race at Imola, Troy Corser secures his second Superbike World Championship.
- 9 October – Mark Skaife and Todd Kelly win the Super Cheap Auto Bathurst 1000 for the Holden Racing Team. It was Skaife's fifth win, and Kelly's first. It was also a seventh consecutive win for Holden, extending the longest winning streak in the races history.
- 16 October – Valentino Rossi wins his fifth consecutive Australian motorcycle Grand Prix on his Yamaha at Phillip Island.
- 1 November – Makybe Diva wins the Melbourne Cup horse racing event for a historic 3rd time in a row and is immediately retired.
- 13 November – French rallyist François Duval and co-driver Stéphane Prévot take victory for in their Citroën Xsara at the season ending Rally Australia.
- 16 November – The Socceroos qualify for the 2006 FIFA World Cup for the first time since 1974, by defeating Uruguay in a penalty shootout at Telstra Stadium.

== Births ==
- 21 July - Joseph Zada, actor.

== Deaths ==
- 8 January – Campbell McComas, comedian, writer and actor (b. 1952)
- 11 January – Miriam Hyde, composer and pianist (b. 1913)
- 24 January – June Bronhill, opera singer (b. 1929)
- 16 March – Bob Bellear, lawyer and District Court judge; first Indigenous judge (b. 1944)
- 25 March – Davis McCaughey, 23rd Governor of Victoria (born in the United Kingdom) (b. 1914)
- 26 March – Paul Hester, drummer (b. 1959)
- 15 April – Bill Longley, speedway racer (b. 1911)
- 23 April
  - Sir Joh Bjelke-Petersen, 31st Premier of Queensland (born in New Zealand) (b. 1911)
  - Al Grassby, New South Wales politician (b. 1926)
- 29 April – Sara Henderson, pastoralist and author (b. 1936)
- 1 May – René Rivkin, entrepreneur and stockbroker (born in China) (b. 1944)
- 25 May – Graham Kennedy, entertainer and television personality (b. 1934)
- 16 June – Ross Stretton, ballet dancer and artistic director (b. 1952)
- 25 June – Sir Harry Gibbs, 8th Chief Justice of Australia (b. 1917)
- 3 July – W. Rubuntja, artist and activist (b. 1923)
- 15 July – Sir Ronald Wilson, High Court justice (b. 1922)
- 17 July – Joe Vialls, conspiracy theorist (b. 1944)
- 18 July – Amy Gillett, track cyclist and rower (b. 1976)
- 28 August – George Szekeres, mathematician (born in Austria-Hungary) (b. 1911)
- 29 August – Margaret Scott, author and poet (born in the United Kingdom) (b. 1934)
- 8 September – Donald Horne, journalist and academic (b. 1921)
- 9 September – John Wayne Glover, convicted serial killer (born in the United Kingdom) (b. 1932)
- 12 October – Frank Galbally, criminal defence lawyer and Australian rules footballer (Collingwood) (b. 1922)
- 14 October – Winifred Curtis, botanist and author (born in the United Kingdom) (b. 1905)
- 18 October – William Evan Allan, soldier; last surviving dual Australian veteran of the First and Second World War (b. 1899)
- 24 October – Frank Wilson, actor (b. 1924)
- 1 November – Michael Thwaites, academic, poet, and intelligence officer (b. 1915)
- 5 November – Hugh Alexander Dunn, diplomat (b. 1923)
- 10 November – Kristian Fredrikson, stage and costume designer (born in New Zealand) (b. 1940)
- 2 December – Peter Menegazzo, cattle baron (b. 1944)
- 3 December
  - Peter Cook, Western Australian politician (b. 1943)
  - Lance Dossor, concert pianist (born in the United Kingdom) (b. 1916)
- 5 December – Kevin McQuay, entrepreneur (b. 1950)
- 12 December – Eric D'Arcy, Catholic archbishop (b. 1924)
- 26 December – Kerry Packer, billionaire and media tycoon (b. 1937)

== See also ==
- 2005 in Australian television
- List of Australian films of 2005
