= Dan Sweetman =

- Born: Daniel Albus Sweetman; Australia
- Occupation: Television presenter

Daniel Albus Sweetman is the former co-host for Network Ten's national cartoon show Toasted TV.

== Biography ==
His father, John, works as a principal pastor while his mother, Debbie, is a piano teacher. He also has two younger siblings, Alex and Zac.

Sweetman has been playing instruments since the 3rd grade specializing in Guitar, Piano, Saxophone, Jazz Flute, Sitar and G chromatic kazoo. He has performed at the 2007 Australian Gospel Music Festival in Toowoomba, Queensland. Among his major influences are Bob Evans, Eminem, Bob Carlisle, The Kinks, a-ha, Ryan Adams, Rammstein, Ray Charles, Coldplay, Mozart, Billy Ray Cyrus and Tom Jones.

Sweetman has represented Queensland U/14s in Basketball and runs the Bridge to Brisbane every second year. Sweetman is the brainchild of the MS Brissie to the Bay ride and has received national recognition for this event. Many other charities have adopted this mode of fundraising since this ride commenced in 1990.

Prior to his 3-year stint on Ten's Toasted TV, Sweetman completed a Bachelor of Creative Industries at the Queensland University of Technology.

Sweetman has often stepped up to talk about bullying and other social issues such as child abuse. He is a Christian and is currently the senior pastor for the Life Point Church in Brisbane.

== See also ==
- Toasted TV
- Pip Russell
