= Gay Weddings =

Television series

- DVD cover
- Created by: Douglas Ross; Kirk Marcolina
- Opening theme: Bridal Chorus – Richard Wagner, arranged by Laura Karpman
- Country of origin: United States
- No. of seasons: 1
- No. of episodes: 8

Production
- Running time: 30 minutes (including commercials)

Original release
- Network: Bravo
- Release: September 2 – September 5, 2002

Gay Weddings is a 2002 American reality television series that aired on Bravo. The series, created by openly gay producers Kirk Marcolina and Douglas Ross, followed two lesbian and two gay couples as they prepared for their wedding ceremonies. Each episode combined interview footage of the individual couples and their families and friends with footage of the various couples going through their wedding planning activities along with video diaries from the couples themselves.

== Couples ==
- Sonja, 39, emergency room supervisor and Lupe, 32, marketing representative. Sonja has a son, Brandon, from a previous relationship. He is supportive of their relationship but they are nervous about telling him about the ceremony.
- Harley, 28, sales and Scott, 32, consultant. Harley and Scott are marrying in Puerto Vallarta because that is where they first got together.
- Dale, 32, entertainment lawyer and Eve, 30, graduate film student. Dale feels that her family doesn't support her marrying a woman whereas they would were she marrying a man.
- Dan, 37, film studio global marketing executive and Gregg, 35, vice-president of an LGBT travel company. They fell in love while on a safari to Africa that Gregg organized.

== Episodes ==
Number	U.S. air date	Synopsis
1	September 2, 2002	Harley and Scott plan their wedding in Puerto Vallarta. They clash over everything from guest list to wedding outfits and wonder whether they should even stay together. Lupe and Sonja shop for wedding dresses and tell Sonja's son Brandon about the ceremony. He is excited and agrees to give Sonja away. Gregg and Dan discuss their families' conflicted feelings about two men getting married. Eve and Dale pick up their rings and search for a venue. Dale tells her parents about the ceremony and is hurt by her family's refusal to treat her wedding as equal to those of her siblings.
2	September 2, 2002	Lupe and Sonja attend a bridal show for ideas for their wedding. Their friends Dottie and Laura offer their back yard for the ceremony and, after facing discrimination in seeking another venue, they accept. Scott and Harley's friends, Tracey and Trent, agree to co-officiate their wedding. Harley is uncomfortable at the religious content of the ceremony Scott writes. The pair are going to couples counseling and Scott is also seeing a private therapist, which bothers Harley. Eve and Dale find a venue they love but Eve's parents back out of a promise to help pay for the wedding. Gregg and Dan discuss having children.
3	September 3, 2002	Scott has the diamonds from a ring he inherited from his father re-set into wedding bands. Eve and Dale meet with ChoQosh, who will officiate their ceremony. Dan tries to secure a venue while Gregg is on a business trip. For Valentine's Day, Dan surprises Gregg with a helicopter ride. Sonja and Lupe go out dancing. Eve prepares a surprise romantic dinner for Dale. Scott, forgetting about the day, has made plans for a trip but sends flowers. Harley spends the evening with his mother.
4	September 3, 2002	Harley and Scott fly to Mexico to finalize their wedding plans. Harley clashes with gay event planner Michael but for Scott's sake backs down. Gregg and Dan hire Merv Griffin Productions to plan their wedding and book the Park Plaza Hotel for the venue. Eve reconciles with her mother. Sonja and Lupe's friend Laura's father is found dead two days before their wedding. Laura's wife Dottie goes ahead with her plans to make the wedding cake the next day, but it looks burned and the weather is turning very cold.
5	September 4, 2002	Despite having to rush to take care of last-minute details and the cold weather, Sonja and Lupe celebrate their wedding. At the reception, Brandon welcomes Lupe to the family. The cake, worrisome because of appearing burned, is pronounced delicious by the wedding guests. Dan flies to Hawai'i as a last-minute surprise for Gregg, who is working a cruise.
6	September 4, 2002	Sonja and Lupe honeymoon near the ocean. Dan and Gregg's friends throw them a bridal shower. Dale's maid of honor Luana throws Dale and Eve a shower as well. Dale and Eve continue finalizing the details, selecting the wedding cake and the menu for the reception and meeting with ChoQosh. Scott's parents fly out to see his gay men's chorus perform the Naked Man song cycle. Dan and Gregg host a rehearsal dinner the night before their ceremony. Three of Dan's cousins come for the wedding but his mother elects not to.
7	September 5, 2002	Dale and Eve have their wedding rehearsal with ChoQosh. She clashes with them over their choice of music and calls their decision to include a very young child exploitative, offending both brides. They end up confused about the ceremony and concerned about ChoQosh's strong will. Scott and Harley fly to Puerto Vallarta with friends and family. Four hours before their wedding, Dan and Gregg have not written their vows. Despite waiting so late, the ceremony runs smoothly, complete with gospel choir, bagpipers, confetti cannons and the couple's dog as ring bearer. At the reception, Gregg's father welcomes Dan into the family as a son.
8	September 5, 2002	Scott and Harley host a party the night before their ceremony, including drag queens for entertainment. The next day, Harley's mother and Scott's parents walk them down the aisle. Scott's parents state in an interview that while they may still not fully understand Scott and Harley's relationship, what's important is not to understand it but to support it. Dale and Eve are also walked down the aisle by their parents, to the sound of ChoQosh blowing a conch. In spite of some awkward moments, the brides exchange their vows. The series closes with some words from each of the couples, describing the difference that getting married has made in their lives.

== Reception ==
LGBT-interest magazine The Advocate described Gay Weddings as "deliciously gripping". MetroWeekly out of Washington, D.C. dissented, saying that the series "is not [a] stellar example of reality TV" and that it "has a cheap, thrown together on-the-fly feel".

Bravo aired the complete eight-part series on January 26, 2003, as counterprogramming to Super Bowl XXXVII. The ratings success of the marathon led Bravo to develop additional LGBT-interest programming, including the very successful Queer Eye and the gay dating show Boy Meets Boy.

With the success of the first season, the production company advertised for couples to appear in a second season of the program. However, no second season was produced. Bravo has no plans to revive the series.

== Controversy ==
During the series' September 2 premiere, Bravo inadvertently ran a commercial for "family restaurant" chain Applebee's during Gay Weddings, despite Applebee's having asked not to have its advertising placed in the series. Right-wing advocacy group Focus on the Family criticized Applebee's as an advertiser. Bravo acknowledged that the ad was placed in error and no additional Applebee's ads ran during the series. The LGBT media advocacy organization Gay and Lesbian Alliance Against Defamation called Applebee's request not to have its ads run during Gay Weddings disappointing and suggested that Applebee's ran a risk of alienating a significant customer base.
