= List of Queer Eye episodes =

Queer Eye is an American reality television series that aired on Bravo from 2003 to 2007.

== Series overview ==
Season	Episodes	Originally released	
Season	Episodes	First released	Last released
1	25	July 15, 2003	April 20, 2004
2	30	June 1, 2004	April 12, 2005
3	19	June 7, 2005	February 7, 2006
4	16	June 6, 2006	September 19, 2006
5	10	October 2, 2007	October 30, 2007

== Episodes ==
=== Season 1 (2003–04) ===
No. overall	No. in season	Title	Original release date
1	1	"Hair Today, Art Tomorrow: Brian S"	July 15, 2003
2	2	"A Great Mess in Great Neck: Adam Z"	July 15, 2003
3	3	"Make Room for Lisa: Tom K"	July 22, 2003
4	4	"He's a Little Bit Country: John B."	July 29, 2003
5	5	"For Better and Verse: Vincent T."	August 5, 2003
6	6	"Queer Eye for Our Production Guy: Andrew L"	August 12, 2003
7	7	"Law & Disorder: John V"	August 19, 2003
8	8	"My Big Fat Greek Haircut: George K."	August 26, 2003
9	9	"Talk, Dark, & Dancin': Josh D"	September 2, 2003
10	10	"Make Over for Daddy: Tom M"	September 16, 2003
11	11	"Meet the Folks: Alan C"	September 23, 2003
12	12	"Neither Rain nor Sleet nor Length of Hair: Jeff T"	November 18, 2003
13	13	"Mr. Clean Comes Clean: Richard M"	November 25, 2003
14	14	"Helping the Hard-Rocking Host: Steven S."	December 2, 2003
15	15	"Create an Officer and a Gentleman: Ross M."	December 9, 2003
16	16	"A Very Queer Eye Holiday: Holiday Special"	December 16, 2003
17	17	"Radio Ralph: Ralph S."	February 17, 2004
18	18	"Stand Up and Deliver: Kevin D"	February 24, 2004
19	19	"Compose Yourself: Warren L."	March 2, 2004
20	20	"Queer Guy for the Skate Guy: John Z."	March 9, 2004
21	21	"Meeting Mildred: Rob M."	March 16, 2004
22	22	"Training Day: James M."	March 23, 2004
23	23	"Do You Know the Mullet Man? Mark F."	April 6, 2004
24	24	"You Never Forget Your First Straight Guy: Lawson C."	April 13, 2004
25	25	"Romancing the Coach: Mark F."	April 20, 2004

=== Season 2 (2004–05) ===
No. overall	No. in season	Title	Original release date
26	1	"Taking on the Twins: Brandon & David B"	June 1, 2004
27	2	"Conquering the Catwalk: David G."	June 8, 2004
28	3	"Dharma Dad: Michael C."	June 15, 2004
29	4	"Straight Outta Brooklyn: Philly R."	June 22, 2004
30	5	"Queer Eye for a Not-So-Straight Guy: Wayne H."	June 29, 2004
31	6	"Raising the Stakes: John S."	July 6, 2004
32	7	"Voice Makeover: Barra F (UK Special)"	July 13, 2004
33	8	"Senior Seeking Style: John K."	July 20, 2004
34	9	"Never too Late to Celebrate: Chris L"	July 27, 2004
35	10	"Top of the (Trash) Heap: Al D"	August 3, 2004
36	11	"Refining New York's Finest: Michael Z"	August 10, 2004
37	12	"Queer Eye for the Shy Guy: Sean K"	August 31, 2004
38	13	"An Opening Night to Share: Winston S"	September 7, 2004
39	14	"It's Only Rock&Roll: Ari V"	September 14, 2004
40	15	"Moving Out but Not Moving Far: John W"	September 21, 2004
41	16	"Second Time Around: Steve P"	November 2, 2004
42	17	"A Queer Eye Thanksgiving"	November 23, 2004
43	18	"The Brady Bunch Does Christmas: Richard M"	December 7, 2004
44	19	"A Home to Come Home To: Ray S"	January 11, 2005
45	20	"A Pigskin Proposal: Brian M"	January 18, 2005
46	21	"Queer Eye for the British Guy: Simon B"	January 25, 2005
47	22	"An American Straight Guy in London: Darin D"	February 1, 2005
48	23	"The Dude Gets a Haircut: Brud L"	February 15, 2005
49	24	"Mike the Mechanic: Mike S"	February 22, 2005
50	25	"A Closet Thespian: Alex M"	March 1, 2005
51	26	"Minor League Loser to Major League Schmoozer: John D"	March 8, 2005
52	27	"From Minor Disaster to TV SportsCaster: Kord S"	March 15, 2005
53	28	"The Best Little Frat House in Texas: Cameron A"	March 29, 2005
54	29	"An Overdue Reunion: Joe H"	April 5, 2005
55	30	"Home on the Ranch: Scott B"	April 12, 2005

=== Season 3 (2005–06) ===
No. overall	No. in season	Title	Original release date
56	1	"Championship Make Better: Boston Red Sox"	June 7, 2005
57	2	"Guess Who's Coming to Babysit? Paolo P"	June 14, 2005
58	3	"Hero on Wheels: Hector D."	June 21, 2005
59	4	"Debut The New Dude: Patrick M"	June 28, 2005
60	5	"Shearing Sampson's Locks: Jim J"	July 5, 2005
61	6	"A Nude Scary Garcia: Jim B"	July 12, 2005
62	7	"Surprise the Super Dad: Lee F"	July 19, 2005
63	8	"A Phenominal 40th: Gary K"	July 26, 2005
64	9	"Send in the Clowns: Michael L"	August 2, 2005
65	10	"Back to School: Pat M"	August 9, 2005
66	11	"Trump-ed to Triumph: Danny K"	August 16, 2005
67	12	"From the Doghouse to the Altar: Joe U"	December 6, 2005
68	13	"From the Doghouse to the Altar Part 2: Joe U"	December 7, 2005
69	14	"Emergency Room to Emergency Wedding: Christian H"	December 20, 2005
70	15	"When Two Worlds Collide: David P. & Maria"	January 3, 2006
71	16	"Surprise Our Stud With Stag Party: Ryan M"	January 10, 2006
72	17	"Expose the Moose for Charity: Stephen G"	January 17, 2006
73	18	"Make Star's Brother a Star: Michael B."	January 24, 2006
74	19	"Clean up Zookeeper to turn him into a Keeper: Carlos F"	February 7, 2006

=== Season 4 (2006) ===
No. overall	No. in season	Title	Original release date
75	1	"Small Time Entertainer to Big Show Headliner: Max C"	June 6, 2006
76	2	"Marriage, Vegas Style: Asher and Tsiliana"	June 13, 2006
77	3	"Turn a Poker Dud into a Five Card Stud: Ed M"	June 20, 2006
78	4	"Bringing Out the Inner Fab: Jeff B"	June 27, 2006
79	5	"Messenger to Model Material: Jesan H"	July 4, 2006
80	6	"Help Fireman Thank His Heroes: Steve H"	July 11, 2006
81	7	"Groometh Yon Lad For Fair Maiden: Eric Z"	July 18, 2006
82	8	"Give Newlyweds a New Lease on Life: Anne Marie & Michael G"	July 25, 2006
83	9	"Trans-form this Trans-man: Miles G"	August 1, 2006
84	10	"Enroll this Trifecta in Domestic Boot Camp: Rotondo Family"	August 8, 2006
85	11	"Turn Dr. Dud into Dr. Stud: Ron B"	August 15, 2006
86	12	"Taking the Stuffing out of the Lovebirds: Erik and Khadijah"	August 22, 2006
87	13	"From Big Boy to Broadway Baby: Eric S"	August 29, 2006
88	14	"Getting Kicked Out of the Garden of Eaten: Adam & Steve"	September 5, 2006
89	15	"Turn This Fat Man into an Iron Man: Todd E"	September 12, 2006
90	16	"Help Widower Learn to Live Again: Jim M"	September 19, 2006

=== Season 5 (2007) ===
No. overall	No. in season	Title	Original release date
91	1	"Straight Guy Pageant"	October 2, 2007
92	2	"Eric & Tracie"	October 2, 2007
93	3	"Julie & Phil D"	October 9, 2007
94	4	"Roth Family"	October 9, 2007
95	5	"Ronnie B"	October 16, 2007
96	6	"Freaky Friday: Ryan V"	October 16, 2007
97	7	"Wayne S"	October 23, 2007
98	8	"Jeff L"	October 23, 2007
99	9	"Boat Builder: Adam G"	October 30, 2007
100	10	"Like Father Like Son: Willy and Nathan M"	October 30, 2007

== Netflix reboot ==
Netflix revived the series in 2018 with a new Fab Five.
