= Michaela Cook =

- Also known as: Micks
- Born: June 26, 1995 (age 31); Cape Town, South Africa
- Origin: Brisbane, Australia
- Genre: Country-pop
- Occupations: Singer-songwriter; Television presenter; Host
- Years active: 2014–present
- Spouse: Jake Moyle (married 2023-present)
- Website: www.michaelacook.com.au

Michaela Cook (born 26 June 1995), also known by her stage name Micks, is an Australian country-pop singer-songwriter, television presenter, and host. She has achieved chart success on both the Australian and United States official music charts, produced award-winning music videos, and garnered international radio airplay.

Cook has made notable appearances on Australian television programs including The Great Day Out on Channel 7 and Toasted TV on Network 10.

== Career ==
Cook began recording and releasing original music in July 2014 with her iTunes topping single Have Faith. Described by Australian media as "Australia's answer to Taylor Swift," she produced nine country-pop singles, accompanied by six music videos.

In October 2015, Cook, along with her sister, founded the record label KMC Records. This record label subsequently released Cook's entire music catalogue. She made her debut on United States country radio with original singles New Life and Chasing Forever in 2016.

In 2017, She released the single Everything Will Be Alright in collaboration with Tourism and Events Queensland, who sponsored the music video for the song. The video was filmed in the Whitsundays region as part of a marketing strategy to promote the area's recovery following ex-Tropical Cyclone Debbie. In 2018, the music video for Everything Will Be Alright won the 'Best Video' award at the Tamworth Country Music Festival People's Choice Awards.

In April 2020, Cook released the single, Taking Back My Crown, accompanied by a music video created in collaboration with Harley-Davidson Motorcycles and Gasoline Alley. During the COVID-19 pandemic, She recorded a follow-up single Let's Go Now, which was released in 2021.

Cook was named as a finalist in the Entertainers category for the Gold Coast Woman of the Year award, recognising her contributions and achievements in the entertainment industry In 2022. She was also recognized as one of the top female influencers by "The Oz's Influencer Index" the same year.

In December 2023, She was listed among Brisbane's Top 25 Influential and Successful Females by the Courier Mail.

She has served as an ambassador for RSPCA Queensland since 2015. Cook made her Australian National television debut on Channel 7's former TV show, The Great Day Out. She also appeared on Network 10's Toasted TV.

== Personal ==
Cook was born in Cape Town, South Africa, but her family immigrated to Brisbane, Australia when she was two years old. She graduated from the University of Queensland in 2017 with a Bachelor of Communications degree.

In October 2023, Cook married Jake Moyle in Brisbane. The couple had become engaged in 2022. Tragically, Cook's father died two weeks before the scheduled wedding date. In a poignant gesture, Cook and Moyle held a private ceremony by her father's ICU bedside and later conducted a vow renewal service on the intended wedding date.
