= Love Is in the Heir =

- Genre: Documentary
- Created by: Jonathan Koch; Steve Michaels
- Starring: Ann Claire Van Shaick
- Country of origin: United States
- No. of seasons: 1
- No. of episodes: 10

Original release
- Network: E!
- Release: November 28, 2004 – January 31, 2005

Love Is in the Heir is an American reality documentary television series on E! that debuted on November 28, 2004.

== Synopsis ==
The series follows the life of Iranian Princess Ann Claire Van Shaick, the granddaughter of HIH Princess Shams of the Pahlavi dynasty, and daughter of HH Prince Shahboz Pahlbod and Beatrice Anne. Against her parents wishes, she moves to Los Angeles with the hopes of becoming a country singer. Her parents disapprove of her lifestyle and make repeated attempts to bring her back to London with no success. Ann Claire's father ultimately gives her a time frame in which she has to become a successful country music star or return to her family and enter into an arranged marriage.

== Episodes ==
No.	Title	Original release date
1	"London Calling"	November 28, 2004
2	"Rich or Richie"	December 5, 2004
3	"Love, Sweat and Tear"	December 12, 2004
4	"The Material Girl"	December 19, 2004
5	"Rubber Hits the Road"	December 26, 2004
6	"Model Assistance"	January 2, 2005
7	"Making the Video"	January 9, 2005
8	"You're So Country"	January 16, 2005
9	"Reality Bites"	January 24, 2005
10	"Home Sweet Home"	January 31, 2005
