= 2005 Australian Labor Party leadership spill =

Declaration of a political vcacancy

2005 Australian Labor Party Leadership spill
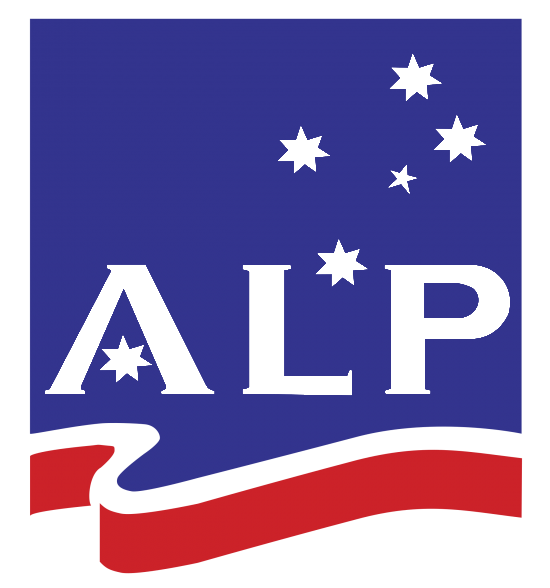
- 28 January 2005
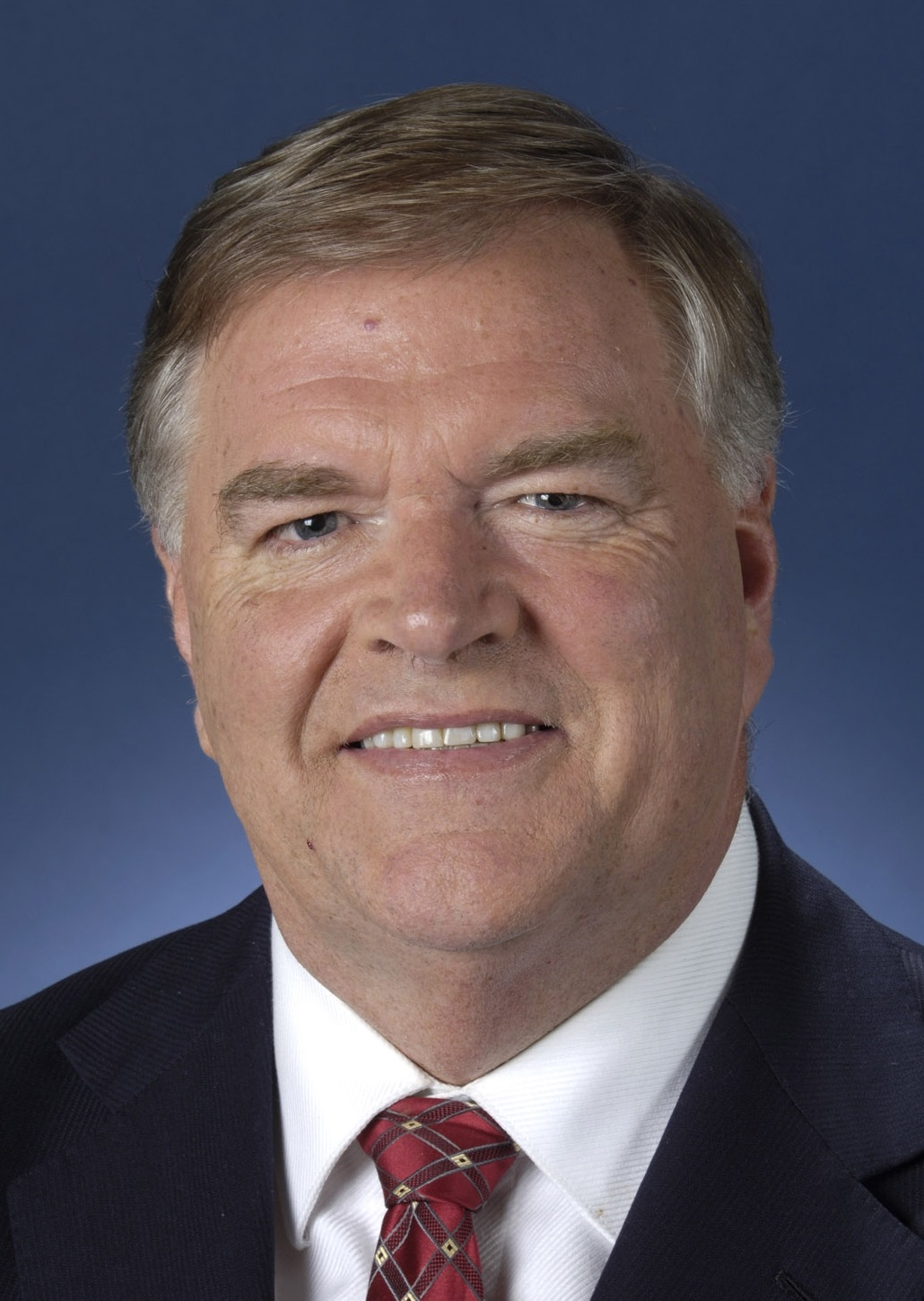
Candidate	Kim Beazley
Caucus vote	Unopposed
Seat	Brand (WA)
Faction	Right
Leader before election
Mark Latham
Elected Leader
Kim Beazley

A leadership spill of the Australian Labor Party (ALP), the official opposition party in the Parliament of Australia, was held on 28 January 2005. The outgoing Opposition Leader, Mark Latham, stood down 13 months after assuming the leadership in December 2003. Kim Beazley was the only contender for the ballot, and was therefore elected unopposed.

== Background ==
Mark Latham became leader in December 2003 after Simon Crean stood down after losing support from his caucus. However, Latham went on to lose the federal election in October 2004.

Latham stayed on as leader after the election until January 18, 2005, when he stood down, citing ill health.

== Candidates ==
- Kim Beazley, former Leader, Member for Brand

== Potential candidates who declined to run ==
The following individuals ruled themselves out as candidates or were the subject of media speculation but did not stand:

- Kevin Rudd, Shadow Minister for Foreign Affairs, Member for Griffith
- Julia Gillard, Shadow Minister for Health and Manager of Opposition Business in the House, Member for Lalor

== See also ==
- 2006 Australian Labor Party leadership spill
- 2003 Australian Labor Party leadership spills
