= Toasted TV =

Australian children's television program

- Genre: Children's television
- Created by: Stephen Bergin
- Presented by: List of presenters
- Theme music composer: Peter Christie
- Opening theme: Andrew Moss and Michael Brown
- Ending theme: Andrew Moss and Michael Brown
- Country of origin: Australia
- Original language: English
- No. of seasons: 15
- No. of episodes: 4,891

Production
- Producer: Stephen Bergin 2005 - 2009
- Production locations: TVQ-10 (2012–2020); Dreamworld (2011–2012); Village Roadshow Theme Parks (2010–2011); Sea World (2007–2010); Warner Bros. Movie World (2005–2007)
- Running time: 60–210 minutes

Original release
- Network: Network 10 (2005–2012); 10 Peach (2012–2020)
- Release: 22 August 2005 – 18 September 2020

Related
- Cheez TV

Toasted TV is an Australian children's television program that aired on Network 10 and later 10 Peach from 22 August 2005 to 18 September 2020.

Toasted TV replaced similar children's program Cheez TV in the same timeslot. The series originally aired on Network 10 until 25 February 2012, when it moved to 10 Peach (then known as Eleven). It was originally presented by Pip Russell and Dan Sweetman; the final hosts were Ollie McCormack and Lia Walsh.

On 13 July 2020, Network 10 announced that Toasted TV has been axed and that the show would end production in August; the final episode aired on 18 September 2020.

== Hosts ==
Original Replacement Final

Name	First Show	Last Show
Pip Russell	22 August 2005	11 July 2008
Dan Sweetman	22 August 2005	26 August 2008
Kellyn Morris	14 July 2008	19 July 2013
Palmer Marchese	27 August 2008	23 February 2009
Sean Kennedy	24 February 2009	23 April 2009
Seamus Evans	23 April 2009	19 July 2013
Ollie McCormack	19 July 2013	18 September 2020
James Symons	19 July 2013	28 October 2016
Elly Bailey	30 October 2016	27 July 2019
Lia Walsh	18 August 2019	18 September 2020

== Format ==
The show targeted an audience of 7- to 14-year-olds. The activities of the hosts are interspersed with cartoons and anime, such as Pokémon, Avatar: The Last Airbender, Beyblade: Metal Fusion, SpongeBob SquarePants, Yu-Gi-Oh! GX (Yu-Gi-Oh! Duel Monsters GX), The Penguins of Madagascar and Bakugan.

Premiering on 22 August 2005, it succeeded Cheez TV, and is produced in conjunction with Village Roadshow Theme Parks, the owner of Warner Bros. Movie World, Sea World and Wet'n'Wild Water World. On 13 July 2011, the show changed to filming at Dreamworld. As of 2 July 2012, the show is shot in a studio.

Regular segments on Toasted TV included:

- Letter of the Week, where letters are read and prizes are given out for them. This segment used to show on Saturdays and now shows on a weekday.
- Facebook Watch, a segment where Ollie and Lia read out a topic they have posted on Facebook and the viewers replies or the posts on their Facebook feed.
- The Week That Was where every Friday, recaps of the week are shown from Sunday to Thursday.

Former segments on Toasted TV included:

- Appearances by a wide range of guests from sportstars to artists and celebrities.
- Bike Wheel of Misfortune, where the bike wheel is spun and the hosts have to do one of the many double dares that have been sent in. The Bike Wheel of Misfortune has five categories of double dare: Physical Challenge, Face Off (Kell vs Seamus), On Your Head, Wild Card, and Down Your Pants. The most popular is "Down Your Pants". This segment was showing on Saturdays.
- Brain Squeeze, the world's dodgiest quiz show, where contestants played for Wahu items. Used to be hosted by Pip and Dan.
- Bread Board, where viewers send in a question about a situation and the board consisting of at least four kids try to solve the problem.
- Chuck It In. This is one of the most popular segments on the show. People send in their gross recipes and Kellyn and Palmer mix them in a blender and then have to drink it. This segment was showing on Saturdays.
- Delson Asprin, portrayed by Palmer who brings in the latest scoop from Hollywood. No longer happening due to him leaving the show.
- E Toasted, a segment that is a parody of Entertainment Tonight.
- Game Roadtest where Kellyn and Seamus test out new games that are yet to be released in Australia.
- Get Active Time, where a countdown timer appears every Wednesday and when it gets to zero, the hosts partake in a short exercise routine. Used to be hosted by Pip and Dan and later hosted by exercise instructor "Frizzie". portrayed by Pip who was a parody of foreign fitness instructors.
- Nelson Asprin, portrayed by Dan who brings in the latest scoop from Hollywood. Replaced by Delson Asprin and revealed his true identity on his final appearance on Toasted TV.
- Song on the Spot, where random people in Movie World say a word for Pip and Dan to make up a song using the selected words. No longer around, since Dan did the playing and left the show.
- Toasted TV Rise and Shine Today, where Pip Russell and Dan Sweetman do various random news reports. Parody of Channel Seven's Sunrise with David and Mel. Replaced by "E Toasted".
- Vicky Schmeckham, portrayed by Kellyn who brings in the latest music news from London. A parody of Victoria Beckham who Schmeckham points out she is not related to.

== History ==
The block's original logo.

The block's second logo.

- On Friday, 4 July 2008, it was announced that Pip Russell would be leaving Toasted TV for Totally Wild, Network Ten's wildlife program for kids.
- On Thursday, 10 July 2008, it was revealed that the new female co-host is Kellyn Morris from Puzzle Play.
- On Friday, 11 July 2008, this was Pip's last episode ever on Toasted TV.
- On Saturday, 12 July 2008, since Pip left the show and Kellyn didn't start hosting, Dan was hosting the show solo on that day.
- On Monday, 14 July 2008, Kellyn started co-hosting Toasted TV.
- On Friday, 18 July 2008, near the end of the show, host Dan Sweetman revealed that he would be leaving the show within four weeks. It was revealed that four candidates are up for the job with the audience having the vote for the new co-host.
- On Tuesday, 26 August 2008, it was revealed that the new co-host is Palmer Marchese, the same day Dan Sweetman left the show.
- On Wednesday, 27 August 2008, Palmer started co-hosting Toasted TV.
- On Saturday, 30 August 2008, Dan temporarily co-hosted Toasted TV since Kellyn wasn't present in that episode.
- On Thursday, 23 October 2008, Toasted TV aired its 1,000th episode.
- On Friday, 31 October 2008, not only was the Pokémon Mystery Dungeon: Explorers of Time & Darkness special shown at 7:30, special guest Pikachu made an appearance on this episode.
- From Thursday, 13 November 2008 until Tuesday, 18 November 2008, Toasted TV went to Wet'n'Wild. Except for Monday, where they do their "Outback Monday" segment.
- On Tuesday, 30 December 2008, Toasted TV announced that Saturday's edition Toasted TV will air from 6:00am to 8:30am, 90 minutes longer than usual.
- From Monday, 5 January 2009 till Wednesday, 7 January 2009, Palmer wasn't present in these episodes. As a result, Kellyn had to host Toasted TV on her own.
- On Thursday, 8 January 2009, Brain Squeeze "Family Fraud" returned to the segment where Kellyn's family was against Palmer's family. Palmer won in a rock, paper, scissors contest, despite the normal Brain Squeeze's final round was rock, paper, anything.
- From Tuesday, 13 January 2009 to Wednesday, 14 January 2009, Kellyn wasn't present in these episodes due to laryngitis. As a result, Palmer had to host Toasted TV on his own. When Kellyn came back, she made a comment that she wanted to go snorkeling when Palmer did it.
- On Thursday, 15 January 2009, not only did Kellyn return, Toasted TV went behind the scenes for the first time. Pip Russell made a cameo appearance saying "I miss you" when Palmer introduced people in the HQ.
- On Thursday, 29 January 2009, this is the very first time Vicky Schmeckham makes an appearance, talking about the latest music on the charts.
- On Monday, 9 February 2009, not only was the fourth series premier of Scope aired, Dr Rob and Julia appeared on the show as well. They also did the famous Diet Coke and Mentos experiment on the show.
- On Tuesday, 10 February 2009 and Wednesday, 11 February 2009, not only was the new series of Totally Wild aired, Sean from Totally Wild made an appearance in the show. Celebrity Bike Wheel of Misfortune was played and landed on Kell and Palmer vs Celebrity. Kell and Palmer won.
- On Saturday, 14 February 2009, the very first Mega Saturday was shown. Spider-Man was on at 7:30-7:45 with the remaining fifteen minutes showing Kell and Palmer playing with rays. Chuck It In and Bike Wheel of Misfortune was aired together for the first time.
- From Tuesday, 24 February 2009, Palmer Marchese was on holidays. Sean Kennedy from Totally Wild filled in for him.
- On Tuesday, 10 March 2009, Victoria Schmeckham (portrayed by Kellyn Morris) announced that "Palmer has decided to leave the Toaster to pursue a big, massive acting career!". As a result, Sean Kennedy is officially the new co-host of Toasted TV.
- On Monday, 30 March 2009, at Wet 'n' Wild Water World, Dan Sweetman returned as a special guest.
- On Thursday, 16 April 2009, during E Toasted, Natalie Hunter from Totally Wild interviewed Zac Efron about his new movie 17 Again and asked him questions that were sent in by viewers.
- On Saturday, 18 April 2009, it was announced that Sean Kennedy will be leaving Toasted TV and a new co-host will take over.
- On Monday, 20 April 2009, the new Bike Wheel of Misfortune was displayed. This time, "Physical Challenge" is replaced with "Can You Feel It?" where the hosts are blindfolded and have to touch something gross. Also, "Face Off" is replaced with "Kell vs ?".
- On Thursday, 23 April 2009, Victoria Schmeckham (portrayed by Kellyn Morris) announced the new male co-host of Toasted TV is Seamus Evans. He also appeared with Kellyn and Sean in this episode.
- On Tuesday, 15 June 2010, Toasted TV celebrated 1,500 episodes.
- On Monday, 14 March 2011, Kellyn and Seamus returned along with their 'Toaster Coaster' (a RV) to present an On the Road series traveling across Australia.
- On Monday, 27 February 2012, Toasted TV moved to Ten's digital channel Eleven (now 10 Peach) every Monday to Friday at 6am to 9am.
- On Saturday, 3 March 2012, Toasted TV celebrated 2,000 episodes.
- On Friday, 31 March 2013, Toasted TV celebrated 2,250 episodes.
- On Sunday, 9 February 2014, Toasted TV celebrated 2,500 episodes.
- On Wednesday, 15 July 2015, Toasted TV celebrated 3,000 episodes.
- On Monday, 12 November 2017, Michaela Cook (Micks) hosted and performed on Toasted TV as their Music Monday guest.
- On Tuesday, 10 April 2018, Toasted TV celebrated 4,000 episodes.
- On Saturday, 10 November 2018, Toasted TV aired a Special Saturday Preview.
- On Saturday, 27 July 2019, Elly Awesome presented her final show and was replaced on Sunday, 18 August 2019 by Lia Walsh after a few weeks of stand-in presenters.
- On Friday, 18 September 2020, Toasted TV aired the final show after 15 years.

== Programming ==
The following is a complete list of cartoons which have premiered on Toasted TV or aired new episodes on Toasted TV. Shows listed according to the era of their premiere.

=== Network Ten (2005–2012) ===
==== Shows ====
- The Adventures of Jimmy Neutron, Boy Genius
- Alien Racers
- All Grown Up!
- Avatar: The Last Airbender
- Bakugan Battle Brawlers
- Bakugan: Gundalian Invaders
- Bakugan: Mechtanium Surge
- Bakugan: New Vestroia
- Beyblade: Metal Fusion
- Beyblade: Metal Masters
- Biker Mice from Mars
- Bratz
- Chaotic
- Code Lyoko
- Digimon Frontier
- Dinosaur King
- Dork Hunters from Outer Space
- Dragon Ball GT
- Eon Kid
- Gadget and the Gadgetinis
- GoGoRiki
- Gormiti: The Lords of Nature Return
- Hero: 108
- Horseland
- Hot Wheels Battle Force 5
- Huntik: Secrets & Seekers
- iCarly
- Legend of the Dragon
- Mew Mew Power
- My Life as a Teenage Robot
- Naruto
- Ojamajo Doremi
- One Piece
- The Penguins of Madagascar
- Pet Alien
- Pokémon
- Pokémon: Advanced Battle
- Pokémon: Battle Frontier
- Pokémon: Diamond and Pearl
- Pokémon: Diamond and Pearl: Battle Dimension
- Pokémon: Diamond and Pearl: Galactic Battles
- Pokémon: Diamond and Pearl: Sinnoh League Victors
- Pokémon: Black & White
- RollBots
- Rugrats
- The Spectacular Spider-Man
- SpongeBob SquarePants
- Stuart Little: The Animated Series
- Teenage Mutant Ninja Turtles
- Teenage Mutant Ninja Turtles - Back to the Sewer
- Teenage Mutant Ninja Turtles - Fast Forward
- Teenage Mutant Ninja Turtles - The Lost Episodes
- Totally Spies!
- Transformers: Animated
- Transformers: Cybertron
- Trollz
- Victorious
- Viva Piñata
- Winx Club
- Yu-Gi-Oh! 5D's
- Yu-Gi-Oh! GX
- Zorro: Generation Z

==== Movies and specials ====
- Pokémon: Arceus and the Jewel of Life
- Pokémon: Giratina and the Sky Warrior
- Pokémon Mystery Dungeon: Explorers of Time and Explorers of Darkness
- Pokémon Mystery Dungeon: Team Go-Getters Out of the Gate!
- Pokémon: The Mastermind of Mirage Pokémon
- Pokémon: The Rise of Darkrai
- Tamagotchi: The Movie

=== Eleven (2012–2018) / 10 Peach (2018–2020) ===
==== Shows ====
- The Adventures of Chuck and Friends
- The Amazing Spiez!
- GGO Football
- B-Daman Crossfire
- Barbie: Life in the Dreamhouse
- The Barefoot Bandits (Teletoon, Nickelodeon and DHX Media Canadian dub with Canadian voices)
- Beyblade: Metal Fury
- Beyblade: Shogun Steel
- BeyWarriors: BeyRaiderz
- BeyWheelz
- Blazing Team: Masters of Yo Kwon Do
- Bob the Builder (2015 TV series)
- Buzzy Bee and Friends
- Cardfight!! Vanguard (2018 series)
- Cardfight!! Vanguard G
- Cardfight!! Vanguard G: GIRS Crisis
- Cardfight!! Vanguard G: Stride Gate
- Cardfight!! Vanguard G: NEXT
- Care Bears: Welcome to Care-a-Lot
- Care Bears & Cousins
- Clue (mini-series)
- Dinofroz
- Dinosaur Train
- Dofus
- Drakers
- The Fairly OddParents
- Geronimo Stilton
- Get Ace
- Gormiti Nature Unleashed
- Hanazuki: Full of Treasures
- Hi-5 House
- Jar Dwellers SOS
- Julius Jr.
- Lalaloopsy
- Littlest Pet Shop (2012 TV series)
- Mako: Island of Secrets
- Matt Hatter Chronicles
- Mia and Me
- My Little Pony: Friendship Is Magic
- Pac-Man and the Ghostly Adventures
- Pokémon: Black & White: Rival Destinies
- Pokémon: Black & White: Adventures in Unova
- Pokémon: Black & White: Adventures in Unova and Beyond
- Pokémon The Series XY
- Pokémon The Series XY: Kalos Quest
- Pokémon The Series: XYZ
- Pound Puppies (2010)
- Puppy in My Pocket: Adventures in Pocketville
- Redakai: Conquer the Kairu
- Redakai: Lokar's Shadow
- Rekkit Rabbit
- Scaredy Squirrel
- Scope
- Sidekick
- Slugterra
- Strawberry Shortcake's Berry Bitty Adventures
- Super Wings
- Teenage Mutant Ninja Turtles (2012)
- Treasure Island
- Tickety Toc
- Totally Wild
- Transformers: Prime
- Transformers: Rescue Bots
- Transformers: Robots in Disguise
- Tree Fu Tom
- Vic the Viking
- Wakfu

==== Movies and specials ====
- Barbie: Dreamtopia
- Invizimals: Tale of Two Dimensions
- Invizimals: The Alliance
- Monster High
- My Little Pony: Equestria Girls
- My Little Pony: Equestria Girls – Friendship Games
- My Little Pony: Equestria Girls – Legend of Everfree
- My Little Pony: Equestria Girls – Rainbow Rocks
- Pac-Man: Santa Pac's Merry Berry Day
- Pac's Scary Halloween Special
- Pokémon the Movie: Black—Victini and Reshiram and White—Victini and Zekrom
- Pokémon the Movie: Diancie and the Cocoon of Destruction
- Pokémon the Movie: Genesect and the Legend Awakened
- Pokémon the Movie: Hoopa and the Clash of Ages
- Pokémon the Movie: Kyurem vs. the Sword of Justice
- Pokémon the Movie: Volcanion and the Mechanical Marvel
- Pokémon: Zoroark: Master of Illusions
- Team Hot Wheels: Build the Epic Race
- Team Hot Wheels: Origins of Awesome
- Team Hot Wheels: Skills To Thrill
- Transformers Prime Beast Hunters: Predacons Rising

== See also ==
- Dan Sweetman
- Pip Russell
- Scope (Australian TV series)
- Cheez TV
