= Bronski & Bernstein =

- Created by: Richard Engel, Josh Broecker, Sigi Rothemund
- Country of origin: Germany
- Original language: German
- No. of episodes: 13

Production
- Producer: Matthias Walther
- Running time: 45 Minutes

Original release
- Network: ARD
- Release: March 14, 2001

Bronski & Bernstein (in German also: Bronski und Bernstein) is a popular German-made police television drama, aired in 2001.

The series is set in Hamburg and focuses on the two-man staff of an office of the Kriminalpolizei - the German Crime Squad - specifically a Mordkommission, or Homicide Commission. In addition to the two policemen, the office is staffed by an Inspector.

The original team at the office consisted of Guido Bernstein and Wolfgang Bronski. This team was also assisted by the main inspector, Theo Micklitz, who comedically yells at the two policemen at the end of each episode about their work.

The show is scripted entirely in German and most characters speak German. It is shot on location in Hamburg and its surroundings, though the usage of areas in production is often geographically incorrect. Subtitles are used for some international markets, while in others the series is dubbed.

== Characters ==
=== Guido Bernstein (Xaver Hutter) ===
Guido Bernstein (Xaver Hutter) is the son of the police commissioner and a law-school drop-out. He is ambitious and impulsive and breaks all the rules. He is also handsome, a flirt and used to living a life of luxury.

=== Wolfgang Bronski (Matthias Schloo) ===
Bronski is another inspector. He tries to keep his family out of the police, as he has a sister and a mother, Angela Bronski and Irmi Bronski. The dependable Wolfgang Bronski (Matthias Schloo) has been working for the Homicide Squad in Hamburg for two years and gets on well with his boss, the Chief Inspector.
