= Queer Eye (2003 TV series) =

American reality television series

- Also known as: Queer Eye for the Straight Guy (seasons 1–2)
- Genre: Reality television
- Created by: David Collins; Michael Williams
- Starring: Ted Allen; Kyan Douglas; Thom Filicia; Carson Kressley; Jai Rodriguez
- Theme music composer: Widelife
- Opening theme: "All Things (Just Keep Getting Better)" by Widelife featuring Simone Denny
- Country of origin: United States
- No. of seasons: 5
- No. of episodes: 100 (list of episodes)

Production
- Running time: 43–54 minutes

Original release
- Network: Bravo
- Release: July 15, 2003 – October 30, 2007

Queer Eye is an American reality television series that premiered on the Bravo network in July 2003, initially broadcast as Queer Eye for the Straight Guy. The series was created by executive producers David Collins and Michael Williams along with David Metzler through their company, Scout Productions. Each episode features a team of gay professionals in the fields of fashion, personal grooming, interior design, entertaining, and culture collectively known as the "Fab Five" performing a makeover (in the parlance of the show, a "make-better"): revamping wardrobe, redecorating, and offering lifestyle advice.

Queer Eye for the Straight Guy quickly became a surprise success, winning an Emmy Award for Outstanding Reality Program in 2004, with subsequent merchandising, international franchising of the concept, and a woman-oriented spin-off, Queer Eye for the Straight Girl. The series name was abbreviated to Queer Eye at the beginning of its third season to include making over individuals regardless of gender or sexual orientation.

Queer Eye ended production in June 2006 and the final episode aired October 30, 2007. During September 2008, the Fine Living Network briefly aired Queer Eye in syndication. The series was also run again by the CBS-affiliated Twist network in 2023.

Netflix revived the series in 2018 with a new Fab Five.

== Format ==
The majority of Queer Eye episodes use the same basic format. The episode begins with the Fab Five in an SUV (usually in New York City, where the series was based) discussing their heterosexual client. The Five review details of the subject's personal life and note problems in their various areas of expertise. The Five usually have a specific event for which they plan to prepare the client. These included everything from throwing a backyard barbecue for friends to preparing to ask for a salary increase to proposing marriage.

Upon arriving at the subject's home, the Fab Five go through his belongings, performing a running commentary of catty remarks about the state of his wardrobe, home decor, cleanliness, and grooming. They also speak with the subject and family members to get an idea of the sort of style they like and their goals for the experience and to discuss the planned event.

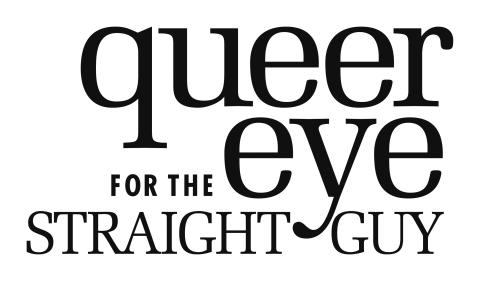
Series logo for the first and second season

The remainder of the first half of the episode follows the Fab Five as they escort the subject to various locales to select new furniture and clothes. Often, Ted demonstrates how to select and prepare food for a particular dish that the subject will prepare for the special event, and Kyan takes him for spa treatments and a new haircut. Each such segment includes a style tip superimposed on the screen, summarizing the style issues addressed in the segment. Interspersed with this are interview segments in which friends and family members of the subject discuss his style issues.

In the next section, the subject returns to a completely redecorated home and models articles of his new wardrobe for the Fab Five. Each of the Five offer final words of advice and encouragement, accompanied by supplies of grooming products, food and kitchenware, and in some cases expensive electronics items such as entertainment centers and computers.

The final section follows the subject as he prepares for the special event, with the Fab Five watching edited footage of his preparations and critiquing how well or how poorly he followed their advice. Finally, the subject is followed through the event itself, with the Five again performing a running commentary and the subject often expressing his deep gratitude to the Fab Five for their counsel. A final tip from each of the Fab Five, usually relating to one of the topics covered in the episode, plays just before the credits.

Special episodes of Queer Eye that deviated from this formula included episodes in which the Fab Five journeyed outside the greater New York area, including shows filmed in England, Texas, and Las Vegas. In two episodes, the Fab Five made over homosexual men (both of which aired during June, Gay Pride Month, during 2004 and 2006), and in one episode made over a transgender man. The show also featured makeovers of members of the Boston Red Sox after their 2004 World Series victory, several holiday specials, and, in the final season, a "Mister Straight Guy" pageant featuring subjects from the series' history.

=== "Fab Five" experts ===
Cast of Queer Eye, from left to right: Kyan, Jai, Carson, Ted and Thom

- Ted Allen: "Food and Wine Connoisseur", expert on alcohol, beverages, food preparation, and presentation
- Kyan Douglas: "Grooming Guru", expert on hair, grooming, personal hygiene, and makeup
- Thom Filicia: "Design Doctor", expert on interior design and home organization
- Carson Kressley: "Fashion Savant", expert on clothing, fashion, and personal styling
- Jai Rodriguez: "Culture Vulture", expert on popular culture, relationships and social interaction

== Production ==
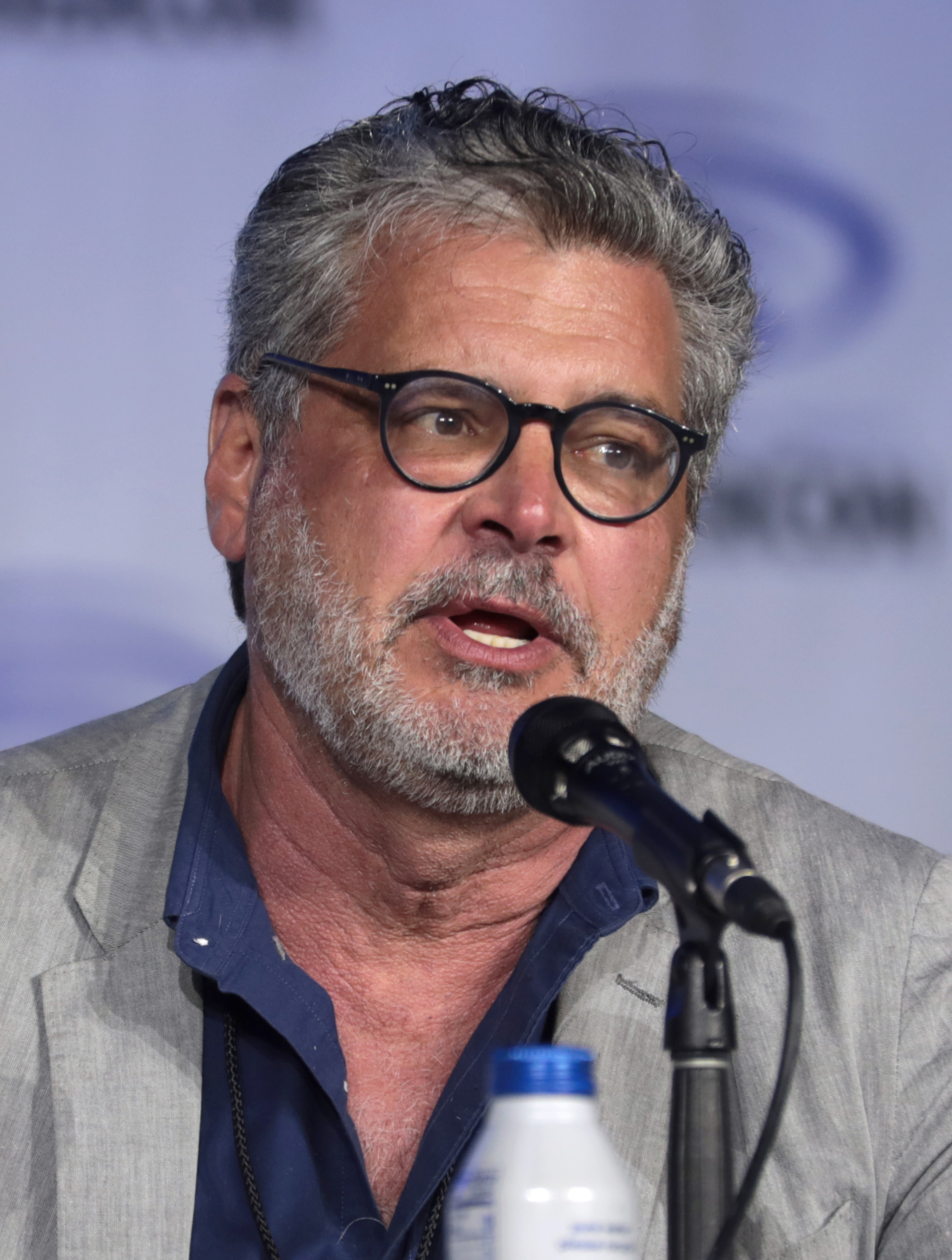
Co-creator Michael Williams

Producers Collins and Metzler were given approval by Bravo to develop Queer Eye after the ratings success the network experienced when it counterprogrammed a marathon of its 2002 series Gay Weddings at the same time as Super Bowl XXXVII during 2003 January. The pilot episode was filmed in Boston, Massachusetts during June 2002. Of the eventual Fab Five, only Kressley and Allen appeared. The culture, design, and grooming roles were filled by James Hannaham, Charles Daboub Jr., and Sam Spector, respectively.

The pilot was delivered to Bravo in September 2002 and was well received in audience testing. Soon thereafter, NBC purchased Bravo and ordered 12 episodes of the series. NBC promoted the show extensively, including billboard campaigns and print advertisements in national magazines.

Kyan Douglas and Thom Filicia joined the show for these episodes, along with Blair Boone in the role of "culture guy". Boone filmed two episodes (which were broadcast as the second and third episodes and for which he was credited as a "guest culture expert") but was replaced by Rodriguez beginning with production of the third episode. Each episode was shot over a span of four days and edited to create the perception that the events of the episode took place in a single day.

== Series overview ==
Season	Episodes	Originally released	
Season	Episodes	First released	Last released
1	25	July 15, 2003	April 20, 2004
2	30	June 1, 2004	April 12, 2005
3	19	June 7, 2005	February 7, 2006
4	16	June 6, 2006	September 19, 2006
5	10	October 2, 2007	October 30, 2007

== Broadcast history and release ==
The series aired alongside Boy Meets Boy as part of Bravo's gay programming block.

== Reception ==
=== Critical response ===
Queer Eye for the Straight Guy debuted on July 15, 2003, and the series quickly attained high ratings, peaking during September of that year with 3.34 million viewers per episode. The popularity of the series established the Fab Five as media celebrities, with high-profile appearances at the Emmys and a "make-better" of Jay Leno and his The Tonight Show set in August of that year. The members parlayed their statuses into endorsement deals, most notably when Thom Filicia became the spokesperson for Pier 1 Imports.

American press reviews were largely positive. Out magazine listed the Fab Five in its "OUT 100", the "greatest gay success stories" of 2003. Instinct magazine declared Kressley one of the "Leading Men" of 2004.

The series attracted criticism for making generalizations about sexual identity, often objecting to ideas that homosexual men are inherently more fashionable and stylish than heterosexuals. Among those making this critique were Tom Shales in The Washington Post ("stereotypes on parade"), Richard Goldstein in Village Voice ("Haven't fags always been consigned to the role of body servant?") and United States Congressman Barney Frank speaking to the New York Post. Author Gustavus Stadler presents similar critiques of Queer Eye emphasizing the expectation placed on homosexual men by society. Queer Eye, Stadler claims, is an example of an unrealistic world in which all queer men are fashionable, hip, witty, and very much enjoy helping a straight man to reach their straight potential. Similarly, Stadler claims this is why heterosexual men find enjoyment in watching Queer Eye, as they envy the "simple" imaginary gay lifestyle held by queer men; a life free from divorce rates, children, and demanding jobs. Anthropologist Lionel Tiger criticized the show's portrayal of heterosexual men: "Heteromales are the last group it is acceptable to bash as a class. The homosexual fellows on Queer Eye seem to provide riveting hilarity to especially female viewers. What if there were 5 Swedes telling Kenyans how to live elegantly and fashionably? What if 5 Catholics told Jews how to dress, decorate, and court? The program is degraded and degrading".

Before same-sex marriage was legalized throughout the United States, there was a study on the distribution of attitudes about gay marriage from residents in Louisiana, Arizona, and Minnesota. Reportedly in this study, 60.9% disagreed with gay marriage with the "intensity of disagreement also stronger for those who disagree compared to those who agree". While Queer Eye for the Straight Guy did last from 2003 to 2007, the attitudes of the U.S audience during these years might have had an effect on the show's popularity during their airing.

With the success of the first season, original "culture guy" Blair Boone sued the show for breach of contract, claiming he should be paid not just for two episodes but for the season that he had been contracted to film.

The popularity of the series inspired a number of parodies. Comedy Central hosted a satirical television series named Straight Plan for the Gay Man, which featured four heterosexual men teaching homosexual men how to be more stereotypically straight, redecorating their homes with neon beer signs and teaching them about sports. South Park spoofed the show and its hosts in the episode "South Park Is Gay!", in which the protagonists learn that the Fab Five are actually the disguises of evil Crab People aiming for world domination by converting heterosexual men into metrosexuals.

Queer Eye won an Emmy Award for Outstanding Reality Program during 2004 and was nominated for another Emmy in the same category during 2005. The series also received GLAAD Media Awards for Outstanding Reality Program during 2004 and 2005, and was nominated for a third during 2006.

In the second season, ratings decreased, averaging about 1.8 million viewers per episode with an average of 804,000 viewers in the important 18–40 demographic. Despite this, new episodes continued to be broadcast for two more seasons. After Bravo confirmed in early 2007 that Queer Eye had been cancelled, the remaining fifth-season episodes were billed as Queer Eye: The Final Season and aired twice weekly beginning October 2, 2007.

The show attracted more criticism than other similar television series from the same time period. James Keller asserts that the title itself seems to cross a boundary; gay men objectifying straight men. Keller also criticizes the exemplification of stereotypes on both sides; gay men who are effeminate, only pursuing artistic careers, while straight men are rude, uncultured and uncivilized. The largest criticism from Keller to be that even if the stereotypes are correct, the show tended to take too simplistic of a view, relying on a sophisticated audience.

Joshua Gamson praised the series and its portrayal of gay men on television saying that it has "produced a fascinating reversal of fortune" where gay men are admired, and straight men are praised for being more like gay men.

=== Cultural impact ===
Creators David Collins and Michael Williams joined Vice President Kamala Harris in June 2024, alongside original and revival cast members, to discuss the series and franchise influence over two decades.

== Spin-offs ==
During January 2005, Scout Productions premiered the spin-off series Queer Eye for the Straight Girl, set in Los Angeles. It featured a cast of four lifestyle experts (three men and a woman, known as the "Gal Pals") who performed makeovers for women. The show was cancelled after one season.

== International adaptations ==
Queer Eye's American success caused television networks in several countries to syndicate the American episodes, with a number of countries creating their own local versions of Queer Eye for broadcast in their countries. However, few of these homegrown versions have proven as successful as the original, and most did not last long before cancellation. Licensing of the format is managed by NBCUniversal.

NBCU licensed British television production house vialondon.tv to produce local versions for Europe, with Flextech's Living channel doing the same to produce the United Kingdom's version after a first attempt at a British production by Making Time was abandoned.

The first episode of the Finnish version, Sillä silmällä, created controversy for the blatant product placement considered to be a transgression of a Finnish law against surreptitious advertising.

Country	Channel	Program name	Seasons	Episodes	First aired
Australia	Network Ten	Aussie Queer Eye for the Straight Guy	1	6	9 February 2005—23 February 2005 NB: Three episodes were broadcast later in the year.
Belgium	KanaalTwee	De heren maken de man	2		2005
Brazil	Netflix	Queer Eye Brasil			2021
Chile	Mega	Ojo con Clase (Classy Eye)	1		April 5, 2013
Finland	Nelonen	Sillä silmällä	2	24	March 30, 2005
France	TF1	Queer, Cinq Experts dans le Vent	1	8	2004
Germany	RTL 2	Schwul macht cool (Gay makes you cool)	1	8	November 10, 2003
Greece	Antenna 1 (ANT1)	Fab 5	1	10	2011
Italy	La7	I Fantastici Cinque	2	22	2004
Norway	TV3	Homsepatruljen (The Gay Patrol)	3	36	2004 & 2012
Portugal	SIC	Esquadrão G	1	8	September 11, 2005
Spain	Antena 3	El Equipo G	1	10	2005
Sweden	TV3	Fab 5 Sverige	1	12	2003
UK	Living	Queer Eye for the Straight Guy	2	14	2004

== Merchandising ==
=== Soundtrack ===
Queer Eye for the Straight Guy

Soundtrack album by various artists
- Released: 2004
- Genres: Pop, dance
- Label: Capitol Records

Professional ratings
Review scores
Source	Rating
Allmusic	4/5 stars

The soundtrack for Queer Eye for the Straight Guy was released February 10, 2004, in the USA. It reached number one on the electronic music chart, number two on the soundtrack charts and the top 40 in the Billboard 200 album chart. In Australia, the soundtrack was released for the Sydney Gay and Lesbian Mardi Gras, and the popularity of the series in Australia resulted in the soundtrack scoring in the top 10 of the Australian album chart on March 8, 2004. It was certified gold in Australia in March 2004. The song "Superstar" by Jamelia from the soundtrack also went to number one on the Australian singles charts in the same week, and the theme song of the show, "All Things (Just Keep Getting Better)" by Widelife, went to the top 20 that month. "All Things" scored a 2005 Juno Award for "Dance Recording of the Year" for Widelife (Rachid Wehbi & Ian Nieman). Rob Eric was the executive producer for the album.

==== Track listing ====
1. "All Things (Just Keep Getting Better)" – Widelife with Simone Denny
2. "Good Luck" – Basement Jaxx featuring Lisa Kekaula
3. "Slow" (Chemical Brothers Mix) – Kylie Minogue
4. "Move Your Feet" – Junior Senior
5. "You Promised Me (Tu Es Foutu)" – In-Grid
6. "Superstar" – Jamelia
7. "Everybody Wants You to Emerge" – Fischerspooner/Billy Squier
8. "Sunrise" (Jason Nevins Remix) – Duran Duran
9. "Never Coming Home" (Gonna Live My Life Remix) – Sting
10. "An Area Big Enough to Do It In" – Prophet Omega
11. "You're So Damn Hot" – OK Go
12. "Extraordinary" – Liz Phair
13. "Are You Ready for Love" – Elton John
14. "Five Gay Men in One House" – Jai Rodriguez and Ted Allen
15. "All Things (Just Keep Getting Better)" (music video)

==== Certifications ====
Region	Certification	Certified units/sales
Australia (ARIA)	Gold	35,000^{^}
^{^} Shipments figures based on certification alone.

=== Books ===
The book tie-in Queer Eye for the Straight Guy: The Fab 5's Guide to Looking Better, Cooking Better, Dressing Better, Behaving Better and Living Better was published in 2004 by Clarkson Potter/Publishers, an imprint of Random House.

=== DVD releases ===
Several DVDs were released in conjunction with the series. Kressley, Filicia and Allen each had individual releases emphasizing their topics of expertise. Douglas and Rodriguez were featured together in a single DVD focused on grooming. Additional DVD releases include Queer Eye for the Red Sox (featuring the team makeover episode) and a multi-disc box set.

== Revival ==
Netflix ordered eight new episodes of Queer Eye in January 2017, to feature a new Fab Five. Scout Productions has contributed involvement with the revival, which trades the original New York setting for Georgia in the first two seasons, and Missouri in the third and fourth. The revival Fab Five are Bobby Berk (design), Karamo Brown (culture), Tan France (fashion), Antoni Porowski (food and wine), and Jonathan Van Ness (grooming).

On review aggregator website Rotten Tomatoes, the season holds an approval rating of 100% based on 13 reviews, and an average rating of 7.35/10. The website's critical consensus reads, "Queer Eye adapts for a different era without losing its style, charm, or sense of fun, proving that the show's formula remains just as sweetly addictive even after a change in location and a new group of hosts." On Metacritic, the season has a weighted average score of 73 out of 100, based on 7 critics, indicating "generally favorable reviews". Following its success, Netflix subsequently renewed it for ten seasons.

== See also ==
- How to Look Good Naked
