= Yodel Australia =

Australian online advertising company

- Type: Private
- Industry: Internet, online advertising
- Founded: Sydney, Australia, 2005
- Headquarters: Macquarie Park, New South Wales, Australia
- Area served: Australia
- Website: web.archive.org/web/20100611091420/http://www.yodel.com.au:80/

Yodel Australia was an online advertising and internet marketing company with its headquarters in Australia. Yodel was also one of a few official authorised Google Adwords resellers in Australia.

== History and locations ==
Yodel Australia was located in Macquarie Park, NSW, and was a subsidiary of parent company fulfilNET Australia Pty. Ltd - in Liquidation. It began trading in 1998 targeting the SME (small and medium enterprises) online market. John Howard made a notable appearance at the opening of the new fulfilNET offices in North Ryde, stressing the importance of small and medium enterprises.

In 2002, fulfilNET announced a 12-month expansion programme, to move from "$5 million to $10 million price range" and in 2003, it partnered with Melbourne IT to provide a range of web site design services for Melbourne IT customers. Three years later fulfilNET established Yodel Australia as a local website advertising company, and in May 2006, Yodel became the first authorised reseller of Google Adwords and Yahoo Search Marketing in Australia and New Zealand. Since registering with WhoisGAP, Yodel has grown to be a company with over 7000 customers and 160 employees.

Yodel renewed its contract with Google in 2007 and expanded to New Zealand, and in 2008, as part of its international expansion strategy, fulfilNET Australia announced that it has secured a strategic alliance with Google for Yodel Australia to sell Google AdWords service in South Africa, Ireland and the UK. while also establishing an office in France.

== Products and services ==
Yodel was a certified Google AdWords Qualified Company, and this was their main advertising service. It employed 26 Google AdWords Professionals to manage the pay per click advertising campaigns of small to medium businesses located in Australia.

Yodel also built and managed their customers' websites, providing ready-made template sites that were customised and edited by the client as well as associated hosting and domain name services. In June 2010, Yodel launched their search engine optimisation services.

== Criticisms and controversies ==
In her blog, Meg Tsiamis questioned their sales method of representing themselves as "Google"

Queensland photographer Olya Hilton signed up with Yodel so she could access the popular Google Ads service, but said she had no increase in hits to her site. "What they do is they take money from people, they tell them that they are going to help them increase the traffic, they're going to help them improve their sales and nothing happens."

== See also ==
- Search engine marketing
