= FAB 5 =

- Created by: David Collins; David Metzler
- Starring: Lakis Gavalas; Tryfwnas Samaras; Giorgos Merlos; Panos Fasoulis; Ilias Psinakis (ep.1-7)
- Country of origin: Greece
- No. of seasons: 1
- No. of episodes: 8 (13 ordered)

Production
- Running time: 43 minutes

Original release
- Network: ANT1
- Release: November 2, 2011

FAB 5 is a Greek reality TV show. The show is based on the American show, Queer Eye. In each episode, the team of five men known collectively as the "Fab Five" perform a makeover (in the parlance of the show, a "make-better") on a man, revamping his wardrobe, redecorating his home and offering advice on grooming, lifestyle and food. The show premiered on 2 November 2011.

== The Fab Five ==
- Lakis Gavalas: "Fashion Savant", expert on clothing, fashion and personal styling
- Tryfonas Samaras: "Grooming Guru", expert on hair, grooming, personal hygiene, and makeup
- Giorgos Merlos: "Design Doctor", expert on interior design and home organization
- Panos Fasoulis: "Food and Wine Connoisseur", expert on alcohol, beverages, food preparation, and presentation
- Ilias Psinakis: "Culture Vulture", expert on popular culture, relationships and social interaction (only episodes 1-7 because he left the show)
