= Pip Russell =

Pip Russell (born 1986) is an Australian children's television host. She co-hosted Toasted TV from 2005 to 2008 before moving to Totally Wild, Network Ten's wildlife program for children.

In 2014 she started Juiced, a television network aimed at children in hospital. Juiced TV airs weekly at the Queensland Children's Hospital.
