= Aussie Queer Eye for the Straight Guy =

- Also known as: Aussie Queer Eye
- Genre: Reality
- Presented by: Liston Williams – Life; Ty Henschke – Fashion; Brendan Wong – Interior Design; Will Fennell – Grooming; Ryan Andrijich – Food and Wine
- Country of origin: Australia
- Original language: English
- No. of seasons: 1
- No. of episodes: 6

Production
- Running time: 42 minutes

Original release
- Network: Network Ten
- Release: 9 February – 23 February 2005

Aussie Queer Eye for the Straight Guy is an Australian reality television series that was based on the original and hugely popular American series, Queer Eye for the Straight Guy.

Much like the American version, the program is premised on the stereotype that gay men are superior in matters of fashion, style, personal grooming, interior design and culture. In each episode, a team of five gay men—known collectively as the "Fab Five"—perform a makeover on a subject, usually a straight man, revamping his wardrobe, redecorating his home and offering advice on grooming, lifestyle and food.

The program premiered on Network Ten at 7:30 pm on Wednesday 9 February 2005, during the first week the 2005 Australian ratings season to a national audience of 903,254. After the second episode saw its audience share drop 20 per cent to 725,263, rumours began the show would now be moved from its prime time slot at 7.30 pm on Wednesdays to 9.30 pm on Mondays. However, after the third episode which aired on 23 February, the Network axed the program. The three remaining episodes aired later in the year as part of a series marathon titled: "The Aussie Queer-a-thon".

== Cast ==
- Ryan Andrijich: expert on food, alcohol and beverages, cooking, and meal preparation
- Will Fennell: expert on hair, grooming, personal hygiene, and makeup
- Brendan Wong: expert on interior design and home organization
- Ty Henschke: expert on clothing, fashion and personal styling
- Liston Williams: expert on popular culture, relationships, and social interaction

== See also ==
- List of programs broadcast by Network Ten
- List of Australian television series
