= Xavier Samuel =

Australian actor (born 1983)

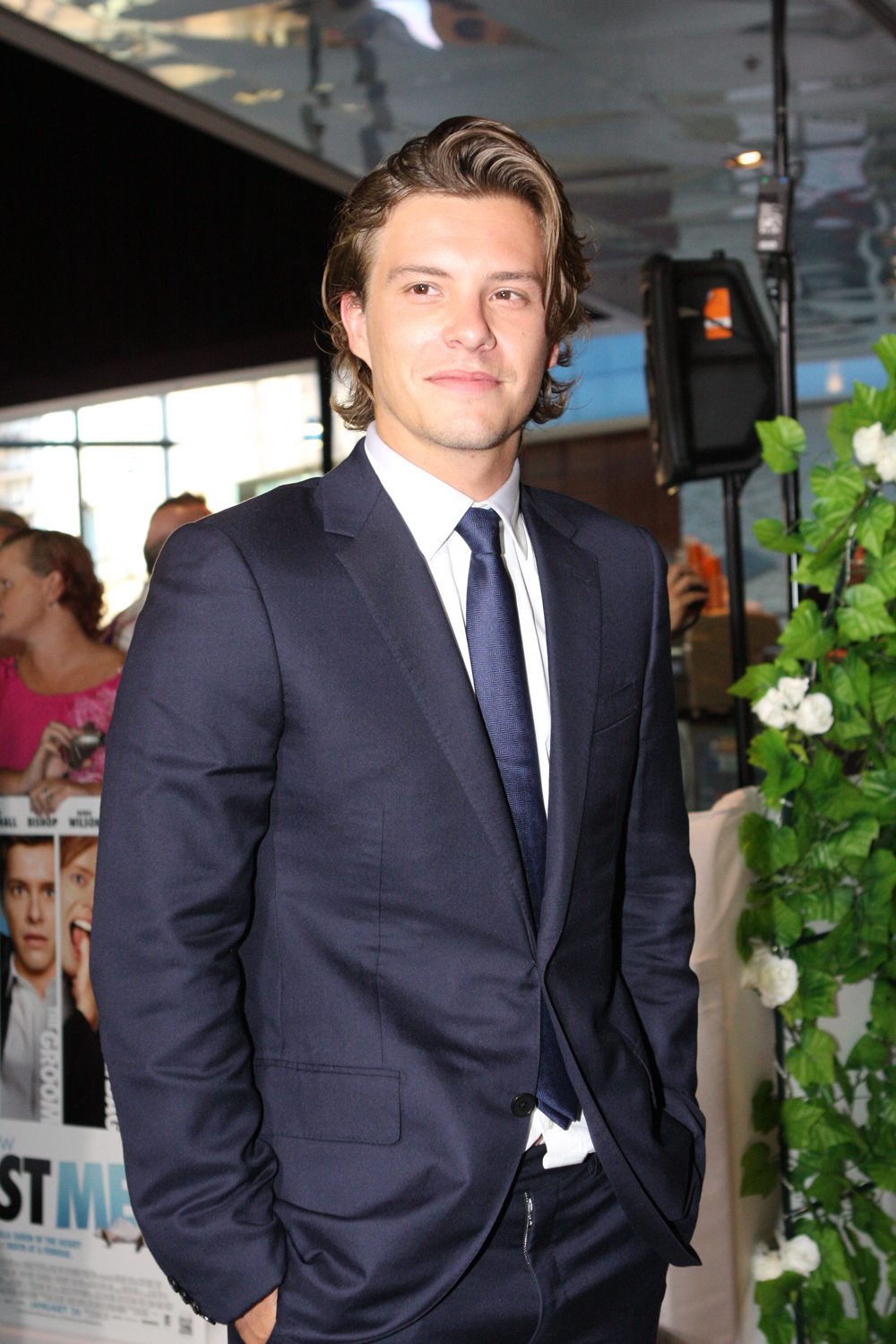
- Samuel in 2012
- Born: 10 December 1983 (age 42); Hamilton, Victoria, Australia
- Occupation: Actor
- Years active: 2003–present
- Relatives: Benedict Samuel (brother)

Xavier Samuel (born 10 December 1983) is an Australian film and theatre actor. He has appeared in leading roles in the feature films Adore, September, Further We Search, Newcastle, The Loved Ones, Frankenstein, A Few Best Men, and played Riley Biers in The Twilight Saga: Eclipse and Billy in Spin Out. He also starred as Cass Chaplin in Blonde.

== Early life and education ==
Samuel was born in Hamilton, Victoria, the son of Maree and Clifford Samuel. He grew up in Adelaide, South Australia, and graduated from Rostrevor College in 2001 where he boarded. When Samuel was 13, his family spent a year in Darwin due to his parents' teaching jobs.

He has a younger brother, Benedict, a writer, producer and actor, as well as an older sister, Bridget, a stage manager.

Despite completing his senior secondary years at Rostrevor College, Samuel undertook final year drama at Christian Brothers College, where he played the part of Tom Snout (the wall) in Rostrevor College's production of Shakespeare's A Midsummer Night's Dream as well as playing Belvile in CBC's production of Aphra Behn's The Rover (The Banished Cavaliers).

Samuel later attended Flinders University Drama Centre and graduated in 2006.

== Career ==
Samuel made his debut on the Australian TV show McLeod's Daughters in 2003. He starred in the Australian horror movie Road Train as Marcus, and also acted in the Australian movie Drowning with Elephant Princess star Miles Szanto, directed by Craig Boreham.

Alongside Mia Wasikowska, Samuel was in the 2007 Australian film September, set in 1968 where two young boys who share a passion for boxing are friends.

In 2008, Samuel starred in the Australian surfing movie Newcastle, opposite Reshad Strik.

In 2009, Samuel was cast as Brent in the Australian horror/thriller movie The Loved Ones in the lead role opposite Robin McLeavy.

In early 2010, Samuel was cast as Riley Biers in The Twilight Saga: Eclipse. The film was Samuel's first high-profile film. Samuel was nominated for, and won, his first film award at the 2011 MTV Movie Awards. In an interview with GQ Australia in November 2010, Samuel described the process of his Twilight casting. "I sent off the audition tape from Sydney, which landed in a big pile on someone's desk. So then to actually hear something back was kind of unusual. I guess I was a bit of a gamble, but it's bizarre and wonderful."

Samuel appeared as Henry Wriothesley in the 2011 film Anonymous.

In 2012 Samuel played a lead role in A Few Best Men with other notable stars, Rebel Wilson and Olivia Newton-John. The film is about a wedding. He reprised his role in the 2017 sequel, A Few Less Men.

Eventually forming a relationship with co-star Phoebe Tonkin, Samuel was cast in 3D feature Bait, released in September 2012.

In 2013 he played Ian in Adore beside Robin Wright and Naomi Watts, which is based on Doris Lessing's book and directed by Anne Fontaine. The film is about two middle-aged mothers who become the lovers of each other's sons. Anne Fontaine coached Samuel through rehearsals of the love scenes in a hotel room using a paid actress who stood in for Wright. The film was shot in Seal Rocks in New South Wales and premiered at the Sundance Film Festival under its original name of Two Mothers.

Alongside Hugo Weaving and an owl, Samuel was cast in the movie Healing in 2014. The film is about a prison program where the inmates rehabilitate birds. When speaking about Doris the owl, Samuel stated that he grew rather fond of her as she was easy to play with and was a real diva.

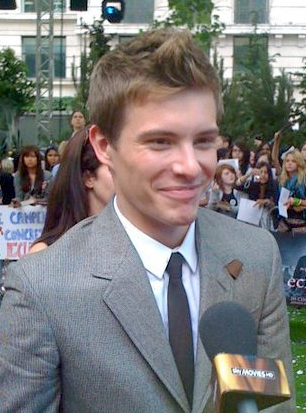
Samuel at the Twilight: Eclipse premier in London in 2010

In 2014, Samuel was cast alongside Brad Pitt and Shia LaBeouf in the $80 million blockbuster Fury, about a group of Americans in Nazi Germany at the end of World War II.

In 2016, Samuel played the titular character in The Death and Life of Otto Bloom, with Rachel Ward and her daughter, Matilda Brown.

In the same year, Samuel performed alongside Kate Beckinsale, Chloe Sevigny, Stephen Fry, and James Fleet in the critically-acclaimed film Love & Friendship, adapted from Jane Austen novel Lady Susan.

Starring alongside Hugo Weaving yet again, Samuel played the role of Simon Heywood in the Australian TV series, Seven Types of Ambiguity in 2017. The series was based on Seven Types of Ambiguity, a 2003 novel by Australian writer Elliot Perlman.

Samuel played Kit Parker in the Amazon thriller series Tell Me Your Secrets in 2021.

In 2022, he starred in the Marilyn Monroe bio-pic Blonde, written and directed by Andrew Dominik and adapted from the 2000 novel of the same name by Joyce Carol Oates. It stars Ana de Armas as Marilyn Monroe and premiered on Netflix in September 2022.

== Personal life ==
As a child, Samuel wanted to be an Australian rules football star like his hero Tony Modra, and is a supporter of the Adelaide Football Club.

Samuel regularly moves between America and Australia to take on roles.

From 2010 to 2011, Samuel dated Iranian-German model Shermine Shahrivar. In 2012, Samuel dated his Bait 3D co-star, Phoebe Tonkin. From 2012 to 2015, Samuel dated his Plush co-star Emily Browning. Starting in 2016, he was in a relationship with model Jessica Gomes for two years.

== Filmography ==
=== Film ===
Key
†	Denotes projects that have not yet been released

Year	Title	Role	Notes
2006	2:37	Theo	
2006	Angela's Decision	Will Turner	
2007	September	Ed Anderson	
2008	Newcastle	Fergus	
2009	Drowning	Dan	Short film
2009	The Loved Ones	Brent	
2009	Further We Search	Age	
2010	The Twilight Saga: Eclipse	Riley Biers	
2010	Road Train	Marcus	
2011	Anonymous	Henry Wriothesley	
2011	A Few Best Men	David	
2012	Bait 3D	Josh	
2013	Adoration	Ian Weston	
2013	Drift	Jimmy Kelly	
2013	Plush	Enzo	
2014	Healing	Paul	
2014	Fury	Lt. Parker	
2015	Frankenstein	Monster / Adam	
2016	Love & Friendship	Reginald DeCourcy	
2016	Mr. Church	Owen	
2016	Spin Out	Billy	
2016	The Death and Life of Otto Bloom	Otto Bloom	
2017	Bad Blood	Vincent	
2017	A Few Less Men	David	
2018	Riot	Jim Walker	
2018	Della Mortika	Lt Pasha Dimitrikov	Short film
2022	Elvis	Scotty Moore	
2022	Blonde	Cass Chaplin	
2025	Champagne Problems	Ryan Garner	
2026	Send Help	Donovan Murphy	
TBA	The Great Departure †	Marc	Post-production
TBA	The Tuna Goddess †	Pete	In development

=== Television ===
Year	Title	Role	Notes
2003	McLeod's Daughters	Jason	1 episode
2017	Seven Types of Ambiguity	Simon Heywood	6 episodes
2021	Tell Me Your Secrets	Kit Parker	8 episodes
2023	The Clearing	Colin Garrison	7 episodes
2023	The Lost Flowers of Alice Hart	Moss	1 episode
2025	Apple Cider Vinegar	Erik	3 episodes
2025	The Last Anniversary	Zeke	3 episodes
2025	The Stolen Girl	Marcus Turner	4 episodes
2026	The Killings at Parrish Station	Michael Thorne (1987)	6 episodes
TBA	Bishop †	Anthony "Ant" Graves	Main role

Key
†	Denotes television productions that have not yet been released

== Theatre ==
Year	Play	Role	Notes
2006	Two Weeks with the Queen	Colin	Windmill Performing Arts
2006	Osama the Hero	Unknown	The Old Fitzroy Theatre
2007	Mercury Fur	Unknown	Griffin Theatre
2014	The Seagull	Konstantin	South Australian State Theatre

== Awards and nominations ==
Year	Award	Category	Work	Result
2010	Nickelodeon Australian Kids' Choice Awards	Favorite movie actor	The Twilight Saga: Eclipse	Nominated
2010	Scream Awards	Best Breakthrough Performance Male	The Twilight Saga: Eclipse	Nominated
2011	Teen Choice Awards	Choice Movie Breakout: Male	The Twilight Saga: Eclipse	Nominated
2011	MTV Movie Awards	"Best Breakout Star"	The Twilight Saga: Eclipse	Nominated
2011	MTV Movie Awards	"Best Fight"	The Twilight Saga: Eclipse (with Robert Pattinson and Bryce Dallas Howard)	Won
2015	Louisiana International Film Festival	Best Actor	Frankenstein	Won
2018	Australian Academy of Cinema and Television Arts (AACTA) Awards	Best Guest or Supporting Actor in a Television Drama	Riot	Nominated
2018	Equity Ensemble Awards	Outstanding Performance by an Ensemble in a Mini-series or Telemovie	Seven Types of Ambiguity	Won
2019	Equity Ensemble Awards	Outstanding Performance by an Ensemble in a Mini-series or Telemovie	Riot	Won
2023	Golden Raspberry Awards	Worst Supporting Actor	Blonde	Nominated
