= $3 =

$3 may refer to:

- Cook Islands $3 banknote
- Cuban peso $3 coin or banknote
- Three-dollar piece (US, 1854–89)

== See also ==
- Fake denominations of United States currency
- Three Dollars (novel) by Elliot Perlman
  - Three Dollars, film adaptation of the Perlman novel
