= Dacre Montgomery =

Australian actor (born 1994)

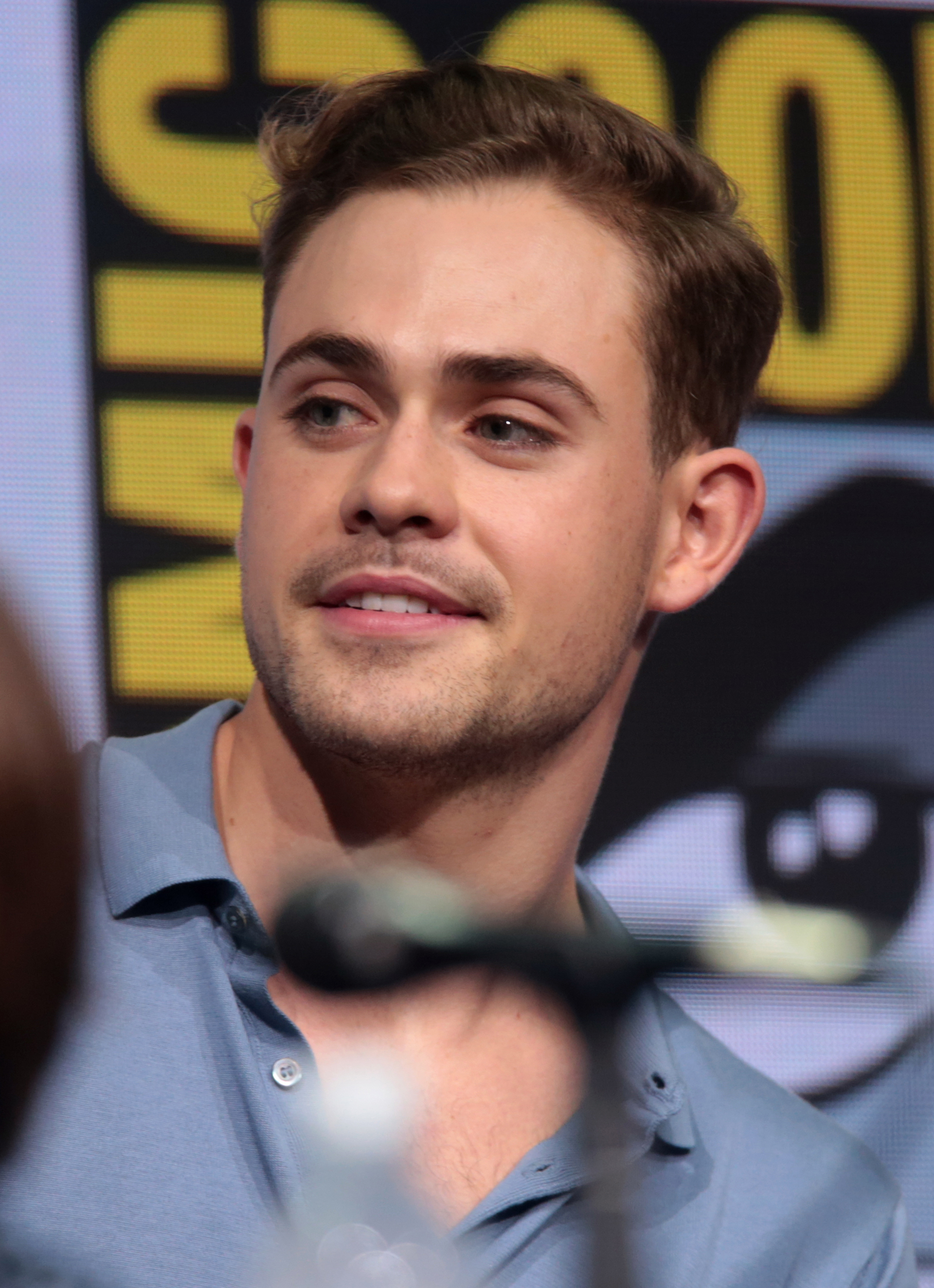
- Montgomery in 2017
- Born: Dacre Kayd Montgomery-Harvey; 22 November 1994 (age 32); Perth, Western Australia, Australia
- Education: Edith Cowan University (BA)
- Occupation: Actor
- Years active: 2011–present
- Partner(s): Liv Pollock (2017–present; engaged)

Dacre Kayd Montgomery-Harvey (/ˈdeɪkər/ DAY-kuhrr; born 22 November 1994) is an Australian actor. Montgomery began acting in short films as a teenager before making his feature film debut in the 2017 adventure comedy A Few Less Men. Also in 2017, Montgomery starred as Jason Scott / Red Ranger in the superhero film Power Rangers, appeared in the Christmas horror film Better Watch Out (2017), and began playing Billy Hargrove in the Netflix science fiction horror series Stranger Things, ending in the fourth series in 2022. His performance in the series earned him critical acclaim and various awards nominations.

He starred in the 2020 romantic comedy The Broken Hearts Gallery. and portrayed Steve Binder in Baz Luhrmann's Elvis (2022). In 2025, Montgomery played a major role opposite Bill Skarsgård in the Gus Van Sant thriller film Dead Man's Wire.

== Early life and education ==
Dacre Kayd Montgomery-Harvey was born on 22 November 1994 in Perth, Western Australia. His father is from New Zealand and his mother is Canadian. He has a younger sister. His parents worked in the screen industry in Australia. Montgomery began performing on screen and in theatre at the age of nine.

Montgomery attended Bayswater Primary School and Mount Lawley Senior High School. When he was in Year 12, his fellow students voted him "The most likely student to become a Hollywood star".

Montgomery completed his acting degree at the Western Australian Academy of Performing Arts at Edith Cowan University in 2015.

In an Instagram post, Montgomery later said that he was a "lost kid." He had a difficult time in school and started to have anxiety at an early age. He said he was bullied throughout his school years due to his weight and interest in theatre. He also failed his drama exams in high school

== Career ==
=== Early work (2011–2016) ===
Montgomery's first role came when he appeared in Betrand the Terrible as Fred, in 2010. In 2011, he appeared in a TV pilot called Family Tree. In 2015, Montgomery appeared in the music video for "Old Souls" by Australian deathcore band Make Them Suffer directed by Jason Eshraghian.

In early 2017, Montgomery starred as Jason Scott, leader of the Power Rangers, in the Power Rangers feature film reboot. On being cast in the film, Montgomery said "Power Rangers was a big break, but it was also my first break which was lovely." The film received mixed reviews and failed at the box-office. He also appeared in the sequel to the Australian comedy A Few Best Men, titled A Few Less Men.

=== Stranger Things (2017–2022) ===
In 2017, Montgomery joined the cast for the second season of the Netflix series Stranger Things as Billy Hargrove, an abusive and unpredictable teenager. He reprised the role in the third season (2019) and in a cameo on the fourth (2022), receiving critical acclaim for his performance. For season four, he filmed remotely from Australia due to COVID-19 travel restrictions while being directed by Shawn Levy over Zoom in the US. Montgomery was nominated for an MTV Movie & TV Award for his performance and, along with his castmates, received two nominations for the Screen Actors Guild Award for Outstanding Performance by an Ensemble in a Drama Series. He later said that being in the show opened up other opportunities for his career.

He took a hiatus from acting in order to "reverse engineer" his acting career, as he did was interested in acting in art house films rather than commercial ones.

=== 2024–present ===
In 2024, he was starred opposite Vicky Krieps in Went Up the Hill, co-scripted and directed by Samuel Van Grinsven. The film premiered at the 2024 Toronto International Film Festival. In 2025, Montgomery co-starred opposite Bill Skarsgård in the Gus Van Sant film Dead Man's Wire. Van Sant cast Montgomery off of his viral Stranger Things audition tape. Speaking about working on the film, Montgomery said it was "rewarding" and added: "It was physically taxing because the wire was real — the handcuffs were tight, Bill (Skarsgård) was at my back, the whole film ... I left set with bruises around my neck and my arms, and a sore back and whatever else, but I think it helps believe the performance."

In November 2025, Montgomery was working on his directorial debut film, The Engagement Party, in which he also stars. Montgomery said that it was something he had been wanting to do for a long time.: "...if it’s the last job I ever do, I’m happy ... I just want to be pushed. I want to explore the limits of what I’m capable of in every way. And this was the hardest, most rewarding experience of my adult life".

In September 2025 it was announced that Montgomery would play the leading role of James Fisher in an upcoming movie Moral Capacity, along with Diane Lane, Tim Robbins and Sofia Boutella.

In June 2026, it was announced that Montgomery would be part of the cast in the upcoming video game Until Dawn 2, the sequel to the previous title. He confirmed he had been involved with development for several years.

== Other ventures ==
On 10 July 2019, he released his own podcast titled DKMH, which features his own poetry. The description of the podcast states that he spent two years compiling his own poetry and getting musicians to help him "bring it to life".

== Personal life ==
Montgomery began a relationship with model Liv Pollock since 2017 and they got engaged in December 2023.

Montgomery has revealed that he has OCD, talking about it in an episode of his podcast. He said that it is a condition that both "fuels" and "hinders" him.

== Filmography ==
=== Film ===
Year	Title	Role	Notes
2017	A Few Less Men	Mike	
2017	Power Rangers	Jason Scott / Red Ranger	
2017	Better Watch Out	Jeremy	
2020	The Broken Hearts Gallery	Nick Danielson	
2022	Elvis	Steve Binder	
2024	Went Up the Hill	Jack	
2025	What We Hide	Reece	
2025	Dead Man's Wire	Richard Hall	
2026	Faces of Death	Arthur Spevak	
TBA	Caine †	TBA	
TBA	Deepfake †	TBA	Filming

=== Television ===
Year	Title	Role	Notes
2017–2025	Stranger Things	Billy Hargrove	Main cast (seasons 2–3); guest star (season 4); uncredited cameo in "Chapter Four: Sorcerer" (season 5, archive footage)

=== Music videos ===
Year	Title	Artist	Role	Director
2015	"Old Souls"	Make Them Suffer	Robert	Jason Eshraghian
2017	"Chateau"	Angus & Julia Stone	Lead Man	Jessie Hill

=== Video games ===
Year	Title	Role	Notes
2027	Until Dawn 2 †	Owen Baines	

== Awards and nominations ==
Year	Award	Category	Nominated work	Result	Ref.
2017	Teen Choice Awards	Choice Sci-Fi Movie Actor	Power Rangers	Nominated	
2018	Screen Actors Guild Awards	Outstanding Performance by an Ensemble in a Drama Series	Stranger Things	Nominated	
2018	MTV Movie & TV Awards	Scene Stealer	Stranger Things	Nominated	
2020	Screen Actors Guild Awards	Outstanding Performance by an Ensemble in a Drama Series	Stranger Things	Nominated	
