= List of The Sleepover Club episodes =

This is a complete episode list for the Australian children's television series The Sleepover Club TV series. It was adapted from The Sleepover Club novel series. Two series have been developed, each with twenty-six episodes. DVDs have been released, including the series by the series 2 girls.

== Series overview ==
Series	Episodes	Originally aired	
Series	Episodes	First aired	Last aired
1	26	12 November 2003	17 December 2003
2	26	3 November 2006	7 March 2008

== Episodes ==
=== Series 1 (2003) ===
No.	Title	Directed by	Written by	Original release date
1	"Perfect Match"	Arnie Custo; Catherine Millar	Ellie Beaumont	12 November 2003
The Sleepover Club play while Rosie Cartwright, the new girl at Crescent Bay, proves to be worthy of the Sleepover girls' friendship when she gives the M&Ms, the Sleepover Club's arch rivals, the perfect payback. Presented by: Frankie
2	"Scary Movie"	Catherine Millar	Chris Kunz	13 November 2003
Frankie still needs convincing that Rosie can prove that she is Sleepover Club material and decides that a scary movie on Lyndz's birthday is the best way to do it but then it turns out that Rosie wasn't the one who got scared! Presented by: Lyndz
3	"Beach Hut"	Catherine Millar	Chris Kunz	14 November 2003
When Mr Stephanopolous, the owner of the girls favourite hangout The Beach Hut Cafe, decides it is time to retire early, Frankie sets out to show him how important he is to the whole community. Will he come back? Presented by: Frankie
4	"Fearlotto"	Catherine Millar	Chris Kunz	17 November 2003
Rosie creates this week's Sleepover challenge—Fearlotto, the objective of the game being to confess your worst fears. Presented by: Lyndz
5	"The Great Debate"	Michael Pattinson	Fiona Wood	18 November 2003
The year 7s have to debate that men are the stronger sex, but the teams are mixed— not only does Frankie have to argue that men are stronger, but she's in a team with Marco, Michael and Sara while Rosie has Matthew, Lyndz & Fliss on her team. Plus, Rosie seems to be feeling oddly unwell. What is wrong with her? Presented by: Rosie
6	"Happy Birthday, Rosie!"	Arnie Custo	Marieke Hardy	19 November 2003
It is Rosie's birthday and she has asked everyone to keep it low key, but now her older brother Will's basketball match threatens to eclipse her day. The rest of the club sets out to find something nice for her birthday but chaos is in the cards as Lyndz doesn't tell the others that she has no money. Also Kenny nearly gets arrested! But she keeps talking in order to get the police officer let her out of jail.But he gives in and lets her go after he finally wants her to be quiet! Presented by: Lyndz
7	"Starring"	Arnie Custo	Ellie Beaumont	20 November 2003
Fliss is not thrilled that her mother's new boyfriend Andy is taking up so much of their time together, and gets especially antagonized when he tries to make a "Sleepover Club Video". Presented by: Fliss
8	"Makeover"	Arnie Custo	Marieke Hardy	21 November 2003
Lyndz is suddenly worried about her appearance after Michael calls her 'butch'. She thinks she needs to bring some spark into her appearance, while the others are worried she's going too far. Lyndz falls out with Fliss because of this. Meanwhile, Frankie makes a deal with Matthew so that he dances with her in the school dance contest. Presented by: Lyndz
9	"Changing Rooms"	Catherine Millar	David Hannam	24 November 2003
Rosie doesn't want to host a Sleepover, but won't tell the others why, so they devise a plan to go into her room without telling her. On a secret mission to refurnish her room, they call upon the assistance of her father David, and her brother Will. The M&M's lose a bet with the Sleepover Club and have to serve them smoothies at the Beach Hut Café dressed in bikinis. Presented by: Fliss
10	"Swim Carnival"	Arnie Custo	Meaghan Smith	25 November 2003
It is the Crescent Bay swimming carnival and the Sleepover girls have convinced Rosie that her father's sudden health kick is due to a new love interest in his life. But who is it? Presented by: Rosie
11	"Car Wash"	Catherine Millar	David Phillips	26 November 2003
The Sleepover Club set up a car wash to raise money to make their sleepovers more exciting, but the M&Ms find a way to ruin the girls' plan. Meanwhile, Lydnz falls out with Frankie. Presented by: Frankie
12	"Outdoor Trip"	Michael Pattinson	Rose Impey	27 November 2003
The year 7s go on a camping trip and a navigational exercise goes haywire, thanks to the M&Ms. Rosie is scared as it is her first trip to the Australian Bush. Presented by: Frankie
13	"Fight for Kenny"	Michael Pattinson	David Hannam	28 November 2003
Kenny is told that her family will be moving to Sydney. The Sleepover Club is on a mission to do everything in their power to stop it from happening, will they succeed? Presented by: Kenny
14	"Bad Things Come in Threes"	Michael Pattinson	Louise Le Nay	1 December 2003
Frankie is really upset about Kenny living in Sydney, but Rosie thinks that the Sleepover Club is too valuable to let go just because the girls are missing Kenny. And Fliss loses the sacred SOC'S rule book. Presented by: Rosie
15	"Election"	Arnie Custo	Meaghan Smith	2 December 2003
Frankie is running for year 7 student council representative, but the M&Ms and Kenny's sister Molly conspire together to ruin Frankie's chances. Will this hinder her? Presented by: Fliss
16	"Shoot to Win"	Arnie Custo	David Phillips	3 December 2003
An outbreak of chicken pox means that Ms Nickels is coaching the Crescent Bay netball team and because the numbers are low, Sara and Alana have been made members, even though they cannot play. Presented by: Kenny
17	"Horseback"	Catherine Millar	Piers Hobson	4 December 2003
Lyndz has a horse-riding competition and Fliss offers to help her on the day. Meanwhile, Frankie finally gets the chance to prove she can be a worthy big sister but needs her friends' help. Rosie's only interest is their school assignment, and Kenny knows nothing about childcare! Presented by: Fliss
18	"Family Ties"	Arnie Custo	Meg Mappin	5 December 2003
Kenny's Gran is bored and looking to add some spice to her life, but Kenny is worried she's going to do herself some damage! Lyndz and Rosie have an argument that could result in the Sleepover Club disbanding. Presented by: Kenny
19	"Agony Aunt"	Arnie Custo	Marieke Hardy	8 December 2003
Kenny becomes the Crescent Bay High style guru for the school paper and influences some weird and wonderful fashion ideas. Presented by: Lyndz
20	"The Winning Ticket"	Arnie Custo	David Phillips	9 December 2003
The local theme park will be handing out a year's worth of free passes to the one millionth guest and every cool kid in the area will be there - including the M&Ms and the Sleepover Club. Presented by: Frankie
21	"Blind Date"	Kate Woods	Jess Ractliffe	10 December 2003
Matthew is busy and no one knows why. Secretly he is helping his cousin Sam teach salsa lessons for the upcoming rugby fund-raising dance. Presented by: Rosie
22	"Greek Sleepover"	Kate Woods	Chris Kunz	11 December 2003
Nina, Mr Stephanopolous' niece, comes to Crescent Bay from Greece for a stay and hosts a Greek-style Sleepover for the girls. Presented by: Lyndz
23	"Price of Success"	Kate Woods	Sue Hore	12 December 2003
Frankie and Fliss are upset because Kenny thinks training with Ryan Scott is more important to her than her best friends. Frankie needs help with the science exam, while the M&Ms have found a way to cheat. Presented by: Kenny
24	"Trapped"	Kate Woods	Anthony Morris	15 December 2003
The M&Ms finally win a prize from entering mobile phone competitions, but the only place they can uncover it is in the garage of Michael's house, where no one can see them. Presented by: Fliss
25	"Graffiti"	Kate Woods	Sarah Rosetti	16 December 2003
The trials are on, but Crescent Bay isn't allowed to participate unless the graffiti artists who are vandalizing the school are exposed. Presented by: Frankie
26	"End of an Era"	Kate Woods	John Davies	17 December 2003
Fliss is forced to stay at Matthew's house while her mother is on her honeymoon, causing the boys to instigate a turf war. Rosie and Kenny also start to take more of an interest in boys. The girls throw a party for them once they get back. Presented by: Lyndz

=== Series 2 (2006–2008) ===
- Caitlin Stasey reprises her role from the first series for one episode.

No.	Title	Directed by	Written by	Original release date
1	"What Are Friends For?"	James Bogle	David Hannam	3 November 2006
Frankie meets her cousin after she moves away from her friends back home.She meets Charlie's four friends who Charlie soon falls out with as she tries to help them all at once. Frankie ends up giving the girls a Sleepover Club Book of their own, to solve the problem. Special Guest Star: Caitlin Stasey as Frankie Presented by: Frankie
2	"Tickets for Two"	Mark Defriest	Sue Hore	10 November 2006
Tayla wins two tickets to Spectaculand and she can't decide who she will take with her. The girls all attempt to get Tayla to take them by being nice to her. The blockheads hatch a plan so that she'll go with Jason, but it all backfires. In the end she gives the tickets to her mum and little sister since she could not pick only one of her friends. Presented by: Tayla
3	"Cringe City"	Mark Defriest	Sarah Rosetti	17 November 2006
When Brooke has her first sleepover she is embarrassed about what the girls will think of her parents so she keeps making excuses to avoid it, and ends up pretending that Lisa is pregnant. However the girls still want the sleepover and end up deciding that they should turn it into a baby shower for Lisa. When Brooke hears her parents talk about the baby, it turns out that Lisa really was pregnant. Presented by: Brooke
4	"And the Winner is..."	James Bogle	Rose Impey	24 November 2006
When Tayla is upset about everyone in The Sleepover Club winning competitions except her she enters a competition to make a front cover for a girl's fashion magazine, but it is really bad. Jess gets a chance to secretly improve the cover before she sends it. Tayla ends up being one of three lucky finalists. The competition goes to her head and she ends up neglecting the SOC girls so they fall out with her. Presented by: Jess
5	"Where's the Bear?"	James Bogle	Sue Hore	1 December 2006
Maddie wins a bear at crazy golf and Simon steals it and the blockheads send photos of the bear to taunt the SOC girls. Brooke had hidden a locket for her mum's birthday inside the bear's backpack so the SOC girls dress as spies and secretly go undercover inside Jason's house to retrieve the bear but can't find it end up stealing Jason's hat as a ransom for the bear. Presented by: Brooke
6	"Dance Fever"	James Bogle	Rose Impey	8 December 2006
Barry, a boy at school who has no friends, is tricked by Jason into thinking that Maddie likes him but she really doesn't. Eventually he finds out she never liked him and Maddie and Barry get revenge on Jason. Meanwhile the SOC girls are getting ready for the school dance. Barry and Maddie secretly have dance lessons together. Krystal and Caitlin enter the school dance contest thinking that they are sure to win because Krystal's dad is the judge. But in the end Maddie and Barry end up winning. Presented by: Maddie
7	"Bird in the Hand"	James Bogle	Shirley Van Sanden	15 December 2006
The school Principal's budgie isn't feeling well. The girls offer to look after the bird. Unfortunately, they lose it. The SOC girls end up getting a new budgie just like it and try to train it to be like the one they lost, but it is not convincing enough. Eventually they find it, just in time no thanks to the blockheads. Presented by: Brooke
8	"The Haunting"	Mark Defriest	Sarah Rosetti	12 January 2007
The Sleepover Club shoot a film at a haunted prison that closed 14 years ago, for a school project. Meanwhile, the Blockheads shoot their film there too and scare the SOC. The girls think up a plan to get them back good. Presented by: Brooke
9	"Blast from the Past"	Andrew Lewis	Annie Fox	19 January 2007
Tayla is failing miserably at history and if she doesn't pass she is going to be sent to another school called St. Anne's. At first she isn't bothered and she gives up. But when she sees the school uniform she freaks and starts studying. She's still no good but then she finds a weird but helpful way of learning. Presented by: Tayla
10	"Prankfest"	Andrew Lewis	Vanessa Yardley	26 January 2007
The Blockheads are out to prank everyone in sight during the school's weekend at camp. The SOC must team up with an unlikely ally to get revenge. They get their revenge but what will the consequences be? Presented by: Charlie
11	"Fallen Star"	James Bogle	Vanessa Yardley	2 February 2007
Jess wins a contest based on her favorite TV show Beach of Hearts and gets to hang out with the show's main actress. But Jess discovers that she's not all she seems on TV, she's horrible. But who will she choose, her or the SOC? Presented by: Jess
12	"The Crush"	James Bogle	David Hannam	9 February 2007
Charlie has a crush on a surfer called Angus Miller, but grows increasingly jealous of the time he spends with Jess. At first Charlie claims that she doesn't have a crush on him but she wants to get his attention. Meanwhile Krystal tries to get information about Angus for the newspaper Presented by: Jess
13	"I Spy"	Andrew Lewis	John Thomson	16 February 2007
Krystal dumps Caitlyn as a friend, causing Jess to take pity on her and invite her to hang with the SOC. But Krystal sees this as a way she can use to her advantage and gets Caitlyn to try to find out the SOC secrets. The SOC find out about Krystal's plan and luckily Caitlin and Krystal don't find out any of their secrets. Presented by: Charlie
14	"Walk Like a Boy"	Steve Peddie	David Hannam	14 December 2007
The sailing contest gives $500 to the boy that wins and only $250 to the girl that wins. So Maddie decides to enter as a boy called Buddy Guy. But the Blockheads also have their eyes on the prize. Maddie has to dress, talk and act like a boy. But can she beat Jason and prove a point that the boys and girls prizes should be the same? Presented by: Maddy
15	"The Front Page"	James Bogle	David Hannam	21 December 2007
Charlie is thrilled to receive a trial on the school paper, but finds it impossible to get a good story. The rest of the girls secretly invent a story to help her out. But it ends up turning into an investigation and nearly making the lunch lady lose her job. Presented by: Charlie
16	"The Deep End"	Mark Defriest	Annie Fox	11 January 2008
When Jason throws a sweet at Charlie during swim practice, she zooms off and wins the race by a fluke. She then gets on the swim team, and it starts to get to Maddie as sport is her thing. Maddie decides to beat Charlie at the things she's good at. The whole time Krystal is plotting a plan so that she can win the swim race with the help of the Blockheads. Will Maddie and Charlie reconcile and can Maddie beat Krystal in the race? Presented by: Maddy
17	"Never Too Old"	Steve Peddie	Sarah Rosetti	18 January 2008
Mrs. Pendrety, a sad old woman is knocked over by accident from the girls while chasing the Blockheads. Charlie invites her to stay with her until she feels better but she annoys the girls by making them be her slave. But then, it gets far more exciting when they give her a makeover. Presented by: Charlie
18	"Secret Admirer"	Mark Defriest	David Hannam	25 January 2008
It is own clothes day at their school and the other girls feel guilty for ruining one of Brooke’s T-shirts, so they go shopping for something new for her to wear. But when she arrives at school she has a shock when she sees Krystal has the exact same outfit as her. What will the sleepover club do to cheer her up? And how far will they go? Presented by: Brooke
19	"Set Them Free"	Steve Peddie	Sarah Rosetti	1 February 2008
Maddy's room is a mess so the other girls decide to clean it for her while she is out surfing. Whilst cleaning her room though they find something that might result in Maddy leaving the club. So to prove how much they will miss her, they show her how much she means to them. Meanwhile Jason wants to get rid of his lizard so he can get a Python, And Krystal wants a dog. Presented by: Maddy
20	"Six is a Crowd"	Steve Peddie	David Hannam	8 February 2008
Caitlyn's sick and Krystal can't stay at her place when her parents go away for the weekend, so her parents leave her at Charlie's house. Krystal pretends to be nice and tries to become part of the S.O.C. just to win a bet with Jason. They find out her plan and get revenge by making her do tasks which they tell her are required for entry into the sleepover club. Presented by: Charlie
21	"What About Me?"	James Bogle	David Hannam	15 February 2008
Maddy's older cousin Reese comes to stay. When the girls basketball team Coach has to go interstate they ask Reese to be their Coach. Then Krystal is determined to beat them in the grand final and she starts a bet. But the girls end up tricking Krystal's team into thinking they know their gameplan, but it was a fake gameplan so Krystals's team aren't prepared and the SOC girls end up winning. Presented by: Maddy
22	"Tropicana Sunrise"	James Bogle	David Hannam	22 February 2008
There is a baking competition in school and Brooke's cake looks set to win. However after break they come back to find it has gone missing and Brooke is determined to find out who is responsible. Presented by: Brooke
23	"Secrets"	Mark Defriest	Sarah Rosetti	29 February 2008
Charlie has a secret diary which lists really mean things about the rest of the SOC's. Meanwhile when it goes missing the blockheads try to read it but find out that it is voice activated so they try to secretly record Charlie saying the passwords. Caitlyn also has a secret but she doesn't want to tell Krystal. The Sleepover Club find Charlie's Diary and everything turns out alright. Presented by: Charlie
24	"Surprise"	James Bogle	Sue Hore	7 March 2008
Tayla's 13th birthday is coming up and the SOC girls want to throw a surprise party. They act suspiciously around her as they try to keep it a secret. Krystal tries to makes Tayla feel like the girls are avoiding her because they don't want to be friends with her anymore. However it ends up okay in the end much to Krystal's hatred. Presented by: Tayla
25	"One in, All In"	James Bogle	Sue Hore	14 March 2008
When Charlie makes a presentation at the abandoned orphanage the Blockheads notice that the book that Charlie used dropped out of her bag. That night the girls were supposed to see The Galaxy SuperNova premiere. Charlie and Jason end up locked inside the orphanage for 4 hours and the girls miss the premiere. Jason gets 5 tickets to another movie premiere to give to the SOC's as they missed out on the Galaxy SuperNova one. Presented by: Charlie
26	"Curtain Up"	Mark Defriest	Phil Thomson	21 March 2008
When Charlie gets to be the director of the school play, the SOC is relieved and Tayla thinks that Charlie will let her play the part of Cinderella, but when Charlie realises that Krystal is a much better actress, she lets her play the part and Tayla is upset. Also there are disagreements between The Blockheads and Krystal which upsets Charlie, but in the end Charlie finds a way to please everyone and they all put on a stunning performance. Presented by: Charlie
