= The Sleepover Club (TV series) =

- Genre: Teen sitcom Comedy drama
- Created by: Sue Rose
- Based on: The Sleepover Club by Rose Impey
- Starring: Caitlin Stasey; Ashleigh Chisholm; Hannah Wang; Basia A'Hern; Eliza Taylor; Morgan Griffin; Rachel Watson; Emanuelle Bains; Monique Williams; Katie Nazer-Hennings
- Country of origin: Australia
- Original language: English
- No. of series: 2
- No. of episodes: 52 (list of episodes)

Production
- Executive producer: Ewan Burnett
- Producer: Andy Rowley
- Camera setup: Single-camera
- Running time: 24 minutes
- Production companies: Burberry Productions; Wark Clements; Rialto Films; Southern Star Entertainment

Original release
- Network: Nine Network
- Release: 12 November 2003 – 21 March 2008

The Sleepover Club is an Australian television series that was created by Sue Rose and produced by Andy Rowley for Wark Clements and Burberry Production in association with Rialto Films, with the assistance of the Pacific Film and Television Commission for ITV, Yey!, Nickelodeon and the Nine Network. It is distributed internationally by Southern Star Sales. It was adapted from The Sleepover Club novel series. It ran from 12 November 2003 to 21 March 2008.

== Overview ==
=== Season one ===
Frankie with her four friends Fliss, Kenny, Lyndz and Rosie are part of the sleepover club, where each member holds sleepovers. The five-members strong club deals with everyday problems. The main antagonists are called the M&Ms, made up of three members (Matthew, Marco and Michael) who always try to interfere with the girls' lives. The club is also targeted by two posh girls Sara and Alana who always try to either join the club or disband it.

==== Main characters ====
- Francesca 'Frankie' Thomas (Caitlin Stasey) is the leader of the sleepover club. In the first few episodes, Frankie takes an immediate disliking to Rosie, the newest member of the group (due to jealousy - that she denies) even though the other girls get along great with her. Frankie is loyal to the SOC. She is adventurous, determined, stubborn and bossy. She is an only child who lives with her parents, and has always wanted a sister. It is revealed that Frankie dreams of becoming an actress. She has a dog, Megs. Her best friend is Kenny. She secretly has a crush on Matthew. Her favourite colour is purple.
- Felicity 'Fliss' Sidebotham (Ashleigh Chisholm) is a young fashion enthusiast who's obsessed with her appearance. She was known as the bubbly fashionista and also she has a crush on her fellow student Ryan Scott. Fliss' parents are divorced and she no longer sees her father. Her mother remarries in the last episode of series one. She has a younger brother, Callum (Trent Sullivan), who was bullied in one episode and hates the SOC. She can be shallow and self-centered. Her favourite colour is pink.
- Kendra 'Kenny' Tan (Hannah Wang) is the athletic member of the club. She is Chinese-Australian and hopes to manage Manchester United F.C. when she is older, as it is her favorite team. She takes part in all sorts of physical activities from soccer to athletics. Kenny is a natural-born leader and is always there for her friends. She lives with her sister (whom she doesn't get along with) her mother, father and grandmother. Her best friend is Frankie. Her favourite colour is orange. In the book series, her name was Laura McKenzie.
- Lyndsey 'Lyndz' Collins (Basia A'Hern) is the fourth member of the club, and like Rosie she is also from England. She is considered to be the nicest member of the group. Although she has shown to be short-tempered at times. Lyndz tries her best to fit in and at times has low self-esteem. She is passionate about animals, especially horses. It has been mentioned that when she is older, she wants to run a horse riding school. She has a fraternal twin brother, Michael. She also has an older brother, Tom (Tim Mager). She later becomes best friends with Rosie. Her favourite colour is green.
- Rosalind 'Rosie' Cartwright (Eliza Taylor) is an aspiring writer and journalist from England. She wants to take after her father, as he is a journalist. She was the last girl to join the SOC. She is the smartest of the girls and can be quite sassy. She is the prankster of the group. She is also often the problem-solver of the group. Her mother died a few years ago and she lives with her father, David, and her brother, Will (Jamie Stewart). The M&Ms call her Rosie Posie. She has a crush on Lyndz's older brother, Tom. She later becomes best friends with Lyndz. Her favourite colour is yellow.

==== Recurring characters ====
- Matthew McDougal (Ryan Corr) is the leader of the M&Ms. His mother is a friend of Fliss' mother, so they often see each other which provides a chance to spy on her and the SOC activities. He is a friend of Fliss' younger brother, Callum. It is implied he has a crush on Frankie.
- Marco de Peiri (Stefan La Rosa) is the friendliest member of the M&Ms, who sometimes gives away the boy's plans. Later, Marco has a growing interest in Fliss, and is shown to secretly be a nice guy.
- Michael Collins (Blake Hampson) is Lyndsey's twin brother and a member of the M&Ms. Despite his antagonism towards the SOC, Michael cares very much about his twin sister, and has occasional fleeting moments of goodness.
- Sara (Annaleise Woods) is dedicated to disbanding the SOC. She is in the same class as Frankie and her friends. She is known as Sara Tiara to the SOC members.
- Alana (Ashleigh Brewer) is the lackey friend of Sara. The SOC members call her Alana Banana. She isn't really intelligent and agrees with whatever Sara says.
- Ryan Scott (Craig Marriott) is Fliss' longtime crush. In Fliss' mind, Ryan is her future husband. She plans to have two children with him, Ryan Jr. and Ryanna. He is friends with Wolf (Lindsay Farris) and Dim (Eamon Farren).
- Mr. Stephanopolous (Vince D'Amico) is the owner of the legendary Beach Hut Café. The SOC, the M&Ms and Sara & Alana all hang out there. In one episode, he almost closes the Beach Hut for good, but the SOC saves it. He has a niece named Nina (Sarah Attalah). The SOC calls him Mr. S. He is very funny and has a childlike nature.

=== Season two ===
Three years after season one, Frankie (now 16) is forced to move away from her home town after her father receives a job promotion, and she takes with her the SOC book. Due to complications, she stays with her cousin for a week. There she discovers her cousin Charlie struggling to balance her social life with her four friends. She entrusts Charlie with a new SOC book as Charlie, Tayla, Maddy, Jess and Brooke form their own SOC. The main antagonists are called 'The Blockheads', and consist of Jason, Simon and Declan, who with the aid of Krystal and Caitlin, try to meddle with the clubs affairs.

==== Main characters ====
- Charlotte 'Charlie' Anderson (Morgan Griffin) is the leader of the second generation of the SOC. Charlie and Maddy have been best friends since kindergarten. Charlie is an only child and lives with her two loving parents. She and Frankie are cousins. When she is older she hopes to become a journalist. It is implied that she has a crush on Jason. She was inspired by Frankie from season one.
- Tayla Kane (Rachel Watson) is not the smartest of the girls. She loves the colour pink. She is very fashion-conscious and always listens to her psychic phone pal, Zodiac Zoey. She lives with her younger sister and her parents. She was inspired by Fliss from season one.
- Madeline 'Maddy' Leigh (Emanuelle Bains) is the very competitive and sporty one of the group. Her main interests are basketball and surfing and she always wants to win. Maddy is also known to be very smart and good in science. She has been best friends with Charlie since kindergarten. She was inspired by Kenny from season one.
- Jessica 'Jess' Philips (Monique Williams) is the artsy and shy one of the group. Of African-Australian descent, she lives with her parents and older brother, Zac. She and Brooke are best friends. She was inspired by Rosie from season one.
- Brooke Webster (Katie Nazer-Hennings) enjoys photography and knows a lot about computers. She is very knowledgeable and loves animals. She has a stepbrother named Simon who is one of the Blockheads. She and Jess are best friends. She was inspired by Lyndz from season one.

==== Recurring characters ====
- Jason Block (James Bell) is the brains of the Blockheads, and is always thinking of a plan to benefit himself. Jason is the enemy of the SOC. Jason and Charlie used to be best friends as kids because they are neighbours. He also has a crush on Charlie, but tries to hide it by irritating her and the rest of the SOC girls. Inspired by Matthew from series 1.
- Declan (Shannon Lively) is Jason's second henchman. Not the smartest, mostly just tags along because it's something to do. Inspired by Marco from series 1.
- Simon Webster (Nathan Coenen) is the main deceiver out of the three, as he always goes with his step sister, Brooke's mind rather than Jason's. He gets the gossip from Brooke to relay to Jason. Inspired by Michael from series 1.
- Krystal Beasley (Julia O'Connor) is always trying to learn the SOC's secrets and asks Caitlin to tell her. Secretly everyone at school calls her 'Beastley'. She is also an only child and extremely spoilt. She is very bossy and rude, but can sometimes be an ally to the SOC girls to get revenge on the boys. Inspired by Sara from series 1.
- Caitlin (Ruby Hall) Caitlin has a lovely personality and is the loyal best friend of Krystal Beasley. She always craves positive attention and can become easily flustered when she receives it, particularly from boys. This is noticeable in episodes such as “The Crush,” involving Angus Miller, and “Dance Fever,” involving Barry. Caitlin also craves Krystal’s approval and has a crush on her. She deeply admires Krystal and wants to please her, which often leaves her easily led astray and constantly doing Krystal’s bidding. The SOC girls often pity Caitlin when Krystal's bossing her about with particular force. Inspired by Alana from series 1.

== Episodes ==
Series	Episodes	Originally aired	
Series	Episodes	First aired	Last aired
1	26	12 November 2003	17 December 2003
2	26	3 November 2006	7 March 2008

== Production and filming ==
Production for The Sleepover Club was announced in December 2002, when Scottish production outfit Wark Clements, Australian major independent entertainment production group Southern Star Entertainment and fellow Australian television production company Burberry Productions had ordered an adaptation of Rose Impey's book series The Sleepover Club, originally published by British publishing house HarperCollins for British children's TV stand CITV and Australian broadcasting network Nine Network with Wark Clements’ head of children’s, Richard Langridge, and Burberry Productions' managing director & executive producer Ewan Burnett would jointly executive produce the series while Southern Star's international distribution arm Southern Star Sales would distribute the series worldwide.

- The original series was produced at Varsity College in Gold Coast, Queensland, Australia and post produced by Cutting Edge Gold Coast and Brisbane. The glorious beaches and attractive beach side homes were a major feature of the series which featured the famous M&M's in various shore side exploits.
- The second series was filmed in and around Western Australia's Perth Metropolitan area at locations such as the Fremantle Jail (no longer in service, but now a major tourist attraction), the Sunset Men's home (turned Psychiatric Hospital, also no longer in use), Churchlands Senior High School and Hillarys Boat Harbour as well as at other various locations.

== Broadcast Australia history ==
- Nine Network (12 November 2003 – 21 March 2008)

== Broadcast UK history ==
- CITV (2004)
- Nickelodeon (2004–2008)
- Pop Girl (2009–2013)

== Australia VHS history ==
- Village Roadshow Australia (2004)

== Media and DVDs ==
Both series of The Sleepover Club have been released on DVD. Besides numerous volumes, the first series was released in 2007 and contains all 26 episodes of the first series, and the second series was released in August 2007 and contains all 26 episodes of the second series.

Title	Region 2 release date	Region 4 release date	Episode(s)	Distributor(s)
The Sleepover Club: Series One	5 March 2007	8 January 2007	26	Blackhorse Entertainment
The Sleepover Club: Series Two	9 November 2008	1 October 2008	26	Blackhorse Entertainment

=== Australia VHS releases ===
- Village Roadshow Australia (2004)

VHS title	Release date	VHS studio	Episodes
The Sleepover Club – Episodes 1-7	2004	Village Roadshow Australia	Perfect Match, Scary Movie, Beach Hut, Fearlotto, The Great Debate, Happy Birthday Rosie, Starring
The Sleepover Club – Episodes 8-13	2004	Village Roadshow Australia	Makeover, Changing Rooms, Swim Carnival, Car Wash, Outdoor Trip, Fight for Kenny
The Sleepover Club – Episodes 14-19	2004	Village Roadshow Australia	Bad Things Come in Threes, Election, Shoot to Win, Horseback, Family Ties, Agony Aunt
