= Rainbow Magic =

British children's book series

- The current Rainbow Magic logo
- Author: Daisy Meadows
- Illustrator: Georgie Ripper (2003–2006); Orchard Books illustrators (2007–present)
- Cover artist: Georgie Ripper (2003–2007); Orchard Books illustrators (2008–present)
- Country: United Kingdom
- Language: English
- Genre: Children's literature
- Publisher: Orchard Books
- Published: 2003–present
- Media type: Print (hardcover and paperback) and eBook editions
- No. of books: 302 (+ 2 upcoming)

Rainbow Magic is a British children's fiction brand originally created by Working Partners and currently owned by Mattel, with some licensing rights held by IoM Media Ventures. It is best known for the children's books published by Orchard Books. The books are ghostwritten by a number of authors under the collective pseudonym Daisy Meadows, and illustrated by Georgie Ripper in earlier books and other uncredited illustrators in later books. The series follows the lives of Kirsty Tate, Rachel Walker, Gracie Adebayo and Khadijah Khan and their magical adventures with their fairy friends.

Rainbow Magic books by Daisy Meadows were the most-borrowed children's books at libraries in the United Kingdom, and the second-most borrowed books overall at those libraries, in 2010 and 2011, respectively.

The Rainbow Magic books were issued by Scholastic Inc. (from 2005 to 2019) and Silver Dolphin Books (as of 2022) in the United States and Canada, and by other publishing companies internationally. Some series and individual book titles vary by country and language.

The books are usually six chapters long, and tell one overarching story spanning out over seven books in the earlier series, and four books in the later series. Each set of books is based on a theme, such as 'The Sporty Fairies' and 'The Jewel Fairies'.

== Characters ==
=== Primary ===
- Rachel Walker – A blonde hair girl who is friendly, caring, loyal, adventurous and fun-loving. Rachel is quite tomboyish and outgoing, and likes a wide range of sports. She is also the one who takes physical action when helping the fairies retrieve their magic objects.
- Kirsty Tate – A brown hair girl who is kind, friendly, loyal, fun-loving and adventurous like Rachel. However, Kirsty is more imaginative and less impulsive unlike Rachel. She is usually the one to make plans when helping the fairies retrieve their magic objects.
- Gracie Adebayo – A black hair girl who was born with a below-elbow amputation on her left hand. She moved from a city centre to Wetherbury Village where Kirsty lives. Gracie is bold and funny as she makes terrible puns to make everyone laugh. She also loves to play guitar despite only having one hand.
- Khadijah Khan – A dark brown hair girl who moved from a city to Wetherbury Village like Gracie. Khadijah tends to be less bold than her friends, and does not like to do public speaking or taking risks, but she does them if she needs to save her friends or the fairies. She also loves to cook as she likes seeing her grandma cooking food.
- The Fairies – A magical race of tiny humanoid people who are the main focus in each Rainbow Magic story. They live and work in Fairyland, a magical land where they do their everyday duties. They also ask for help from the girls' if their magic object ever gets stolen.

=== Secondary ===
- Jack Frost – An enemy to the fairies and the main antagonist of the series. Based on the personification of the same name, Jack is described as ruthless and greedy, and wants to take over Fairyland by hating on the fairies and trying to take their magic objects, but he fails everytime due to the girls' getting the fairies' magic objects back.
- The Goblins – The servants of Jack Frost, and the second main antagonist alongside him. They are greedy green creatures who live in Goblin Grotto, a big village from where Jack Frost's ice castle is. The goblins like to cause lots of trouble, and will do anything to keep the fairies' magic objects away from the fairies, but their own selfishness gives the girls' an advantage in getting the objects back from them.
- King Oberon – The king of the fairies and ruler of Fairyland with Queen Titania. Named after Oberon from Shakespeare's A Midsummer Night's Dream, King Oberon is noble and fair, and is usually the one to deal with Jack Frost in person.
- Queen Titania – The queen of the fairies and ruler of Fairyland with King Oberon. Named after Titania from Shakespeare's A Midsummer Night's Dream like with Oberon, Queen Titania is gentle and kind, as she shows gratefulness towards the girls' help. She is usually by the Seeing Pool inside the Fairyland Palace, where she has access to it whenever the girls' need to retrieve the fairies' magic objects.

=== Reoccurring ===
- Mr. and Mrs. Walker – The parents' of Rachel Walker.
- Mr. and Mrs. Tate – The parents' of Kirsty Tate.
- Chioma and Michelle – The two mothers' of Gracie Adebayo.
- Mr. and Mrs. Khan – The parents' of Khadijah Khan.
- Rafi Khan – The brother of Khadijah who is older than her. He has diabetes and uses an insulin pump for whenever he eats food.
- Bertram – A green frog footman who is a loyal servant to King Oberon and Queen Titania. He is also good friends with the girls'.
- The Fairy Godmother – An occasionally-seen fairy who helps the girls' out on some fairy adventures. She was the one in charge of doing King Oberon and Queen Titania's Jubilee party in the 'Party Fairies' sub-series. She can also do advanced magic by only pointing her finger.
- Queen Grace and King Arthur – The rulers of the Land of Legends, a kingdom up near the clouds of Fairyland made by Queen Titania to help look after myths and legends in the human world. They are a parody of William and Catherine, as they are used to tell the real world events of the Duke and Duchess in some of the books. Grace and Arthur are the niece and nephew-in-law of King Oberon and Queen Titania respectively. They also have two children: Prince George, based on Duke and Duchess' first child of the same name, and an unnamed girl, based on Duke and Duchess' second child.

== Authors ==
The Rainbow Magic books are written and illustrated by a number of authors and illustrators under the 'Daisy Meadows' pen name:

- Linda Chapman
- Narinder Dhami
- Rachel Elliot
- Sue Bentley
- Sue Mongredien
- Kristen Earhart
- Mandy Archer
- Tracey West
- Sarah Levison
- Shannon Penney
- Charlie Hart
- Karen Ball
- AnnMarie Anderson
- Marilyn Kaye

Each title carries a dedication including a "special thanks" indicating the primary author.

== Rainbow Magic: Return to Rainspell Island ==
Rainbow Magic: Return to Rainspell Island
- Directed by: Hiroshi Kawamata
- Written by: Dale Schott
- Based on: The Rainbow Fairies by Daisy Meadows
- Produced by: Jo Aslett; Vici King; Yukari Kiso
- Starring: Lucy Delaiche; Grace Vance; David Holt; Teresa Gallagher; Keith Wickham; Tim Whitnall
- Music by: Sacha Puttnam
- Production companies: HIT Entertainment; The Answer Studio
- Release date: 7 May 2010
- Running time: 60 minutes
- Countries: United Kingdom; Japan
- Language: English

Rainbow Magic: Return to Rainspell Island is a straight-to-video anime movie that was first released in the United Kingdom on 7 May 2010. It is a British-Japanese co-production that was co-produced by HIT Entertainment and The Answer Studio. It was also released in Japan; but only with subtitles and no Japanese vocal track.
