= Bad Blood (2017 film) =

2017 film by David Pulbrook

- Theatrical film poster
- Directed by: David Pulbrook
- Screenplay by: David Pulbrook
- Story by: Patrick Edgeworth
- Produced by: Antony I. Ginnane; David Lightfoot
- Starring: Xavier Samuel; Morgan Griffin
- Cinematography: Lee Pulbrook
- Edited by: Rohan Cooper
- Music by: Michael Allen
- Production companies: South Australian Film Corporation; F.G. Film Productions; Horizon Films; The Post Lounge; Ultra Films
- Distributed by: Potential Films
- Release date: 12 October 2017
- Running time: 90 minutes
- Country: Australia
- Language: English

Bad Blood is a 2017 Australian thriller film directed by David Pulbrook and starring Xavier Samuel and Morgan Griffin.

== Plot synopsis ==
Carrie (Morgan Griffin) is a veterinarian who goes on a weekend holiday with her fiancée Vincent (Xavier Samuel), who is a best-selling author. They spend the weekend at an isolated house in the middle of the desolate forest where Carrie finds that Vincent may not be what he seems.

== Cast ==
- Morgan Griffin as Carrie
- Xavier Samuel as Vincent
- Tess Fowler as Kate
- Rob Macpherson as Mitchell
- Elena Carapetis as Rose
- Patrick Frost as Pete
