= Spin Out (film) =

- Theatrical film poster
- Directed by: Tim Ferguson; Marc Gracie
- Written by: Edwina Exton; Tim Ferguson
- Produced by: Marc Gracie; David Redman
- Starring: Xavier Samuel; Morgan Griffin; Lincoln Lewis
- Cinematography: Justin Brickle
- Edited by: Ken Sallows
- Music by: Jon Hume
- Production company: Stella Rose Productions
- Distributed by: Stage 6 Films
- Release date: 15 September 2016
- Running time: 92 minutes
- Country: Australia
- Language: English

Spin Out is a 2016 Australian romantic comedy film directed by Tim Ferguson and Marc Gracie and starring Xavier Samuel and Morgan Griffin.

== Plot synopsis ==
Billy (Xavier Samuel) and Lucy (Morgan Griffin) grew up together in a small town in Australia, where they form one of the town's most formidable ute driving teams. Lucy declares she is moving to the city after Billy makes a risky car stunt, sending him into a spin. Amid the mayhem of the town's annual Bachelor and Spinster Ball, Billy only has one night to reveal his true feelings to his best friend or lose her forever.

== Cast ==
- Xavier Samuel as Billy
- Morgan Griffin as Lucy
- Lincoln Lewis as Nic
- Melissa Bergland as Mary
- Christie Whelan Browne as Sacha
- Lisa Kowalski as Shazza
- Eddie Baroo as Hammerhead Carney
- Travis Jeffery as Sparrow McGee
- PiaGrace Moon as Taylah
- Mark Nicholson as Tubby
- Tessa James as Kimba
- Brendan Bacon as JJ
- Thomas Blackburne as Rooter
- Dorje Swallow as Podge
- Aileen Huynh as Merline

== Reception ==
Reviews for the film had mostly been negative. The film holds a 13% rotten rating on review aggregator Rotten Tomatoes, with an average score of 3.7/10. Leigh Paatsch of the Herald Sun gave the film a rating of 1 and said "How did this ever get made? And when will it ever end?" Jake Wilson of The Sydney Morning Herald gave it 2 stars and described it as "the glamorised version of rural Australia we're used to seeing on commercial TV." He stated that Samuel's character was the opposite to how he's made out in the film, as a "good-looking captain" instead of a rugged outdoor type he is described as.

== See also ==
- Cinema of Australia
