= Little Brown Bushrat =

Children's book by Georgie Ripper

- First edition cover
- Author: Georgie Ripper
- Illustrator: Georgie Ripper
- Language: English
- Genre: Children's
- Publisher: Macmillan
- Publication date: 21 June 2002
- Publication place: United Kingdom
- Pages: 32
- ISBN: 0-333-96083-1

Little Brown Bushrat is a children's book by writer and illustrator Georgie Ripper, that tells the story of a little brown bushrat discovering that he has special talent. The book is the winner of The Macmillan Prize for Children's Illustration in 2000.

Little Brown Bushrat was initially published in 2002 in the United Kingdom by Macmillan Children's Books (ISBN 0-333-96083-1) as a 32-page hardback edition, was followed by a paperback edition. It was penned for readers aged three to seven, and is 546 words long.

== Plot ==
The protagonist is a little brown bushrat. All the animals in the bush have individual talents – the kangaroo can jump the highest, the emu can run the fastest and the duck-billed platypus is the best swimmer. But the little brown bushrat thinks he cannot do anything, until he is given a chance to protect the other animals from danger.

== Recognition ==
The book is the winner of The Macmillan Prize for Children's Illustration in 2000.
