= A Few Less Men =

2017 Mark Lamprell film

- Promotional poster
- Directed by: Mark Lamprell
- Written by: Dean Craig
- Produced by: Tania Chambers; Laurence Malkin; Share Stallings
- Starring: Xavier Samuel; Dacre Montgomery; Kris Marshall; Kevin Bishop
- Cinematography: Steve Arnold
- Edited by: Steve Burgess; Chris Goodes; Gwillym Hewston; Marc van Buuren; Andy Wright
- Music by: David Hirschfelder
- Production companies: Feisty Dame Productions; Gorean Films
- Distributed by: StudioCanal
- Release date: 9 March 2017 (Australia)
- Running time: 92 minutes
- Country: Australia
- Language: English
- Box office: $380,806

A Few Less Men is a 2017 Australian adventure comedy film directed by Mark Lamprell and written by Dean Craig. It is a sequel to A Few Best Men (2011).

== Cast ==
- Xavier Samuel as David Locking
- Dacre Montgomery as Mike
- Kris Marshall as Tom
- Kevin Bishop as Graham
- Ryan Corr as Henry
- Saskia Hampele as Angie
- Deborah Mailman as Sergeant Simpson
- Sacha Horler as Ranger Ruth
- Jeremy Sims as Pilot Pidgeon
- Shane Jacobson as Mungus
- Darren Gilshenan as Eric
- Pip Edwards as Janet
- Lynette Curran as Maureen

== Production ==
Filming took place in Western Australia. Locations include Yanchep State park caves and a quarry near Yanchep, WA.
