= Morgan Griffin =

Australian actress

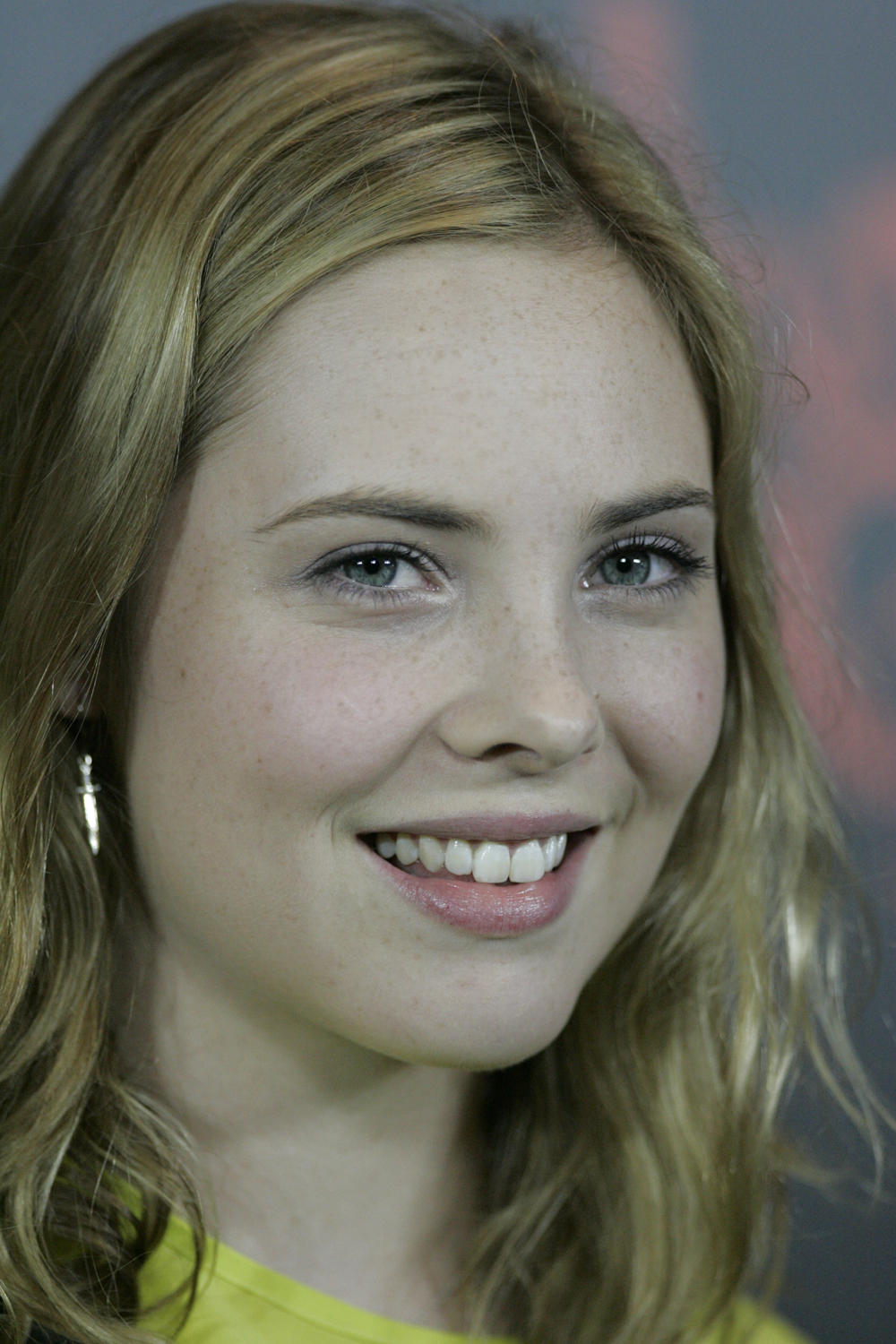
- Griffin in 2013
- Born: Morgan Griffin; Sydney, Australia
- Occupation: Actress
- Years active: 2002–present

Morgan Griffin is an Australian actress. Her career began in the children's series The Sleepover Club playing the lead role of Charlie. Other notable roles include Heidi in September (2007), Alice in Nim's Island (2008), Katrina Post in Accidents Happen (2009) opposite Geena Davis and Jess in Charlie & Boots (2009) opposite Paul Hogan and Shane Jacobson. Griffin went on to perform alongside David Duchovny and Hope Davis as their daughter in Anthony Fabian's film Louder Than Words. She appeared in Angelina Jolie's film Unbroken, and in 2015, Griffin appeared in director Brad Peyton's disaster film San Andreas opposite Dwayne Johnson. In 2017 she was awarded a place in the top ten finalists for Australians in Film's Heath Ledger Scholarship. In 2018, Griffin portrayed Young Olivia Newton-John in Olivia Newton-John: Hopelessly Devoted to You. In 2020, she starred in the Australian independent film Reaching Distance and as Tiff Adams in the Australian series Amazing Grace.

== Filmography ==
=== Film ===
Year	Title	Role	Notes
2007	September	Heidi	Film
2008	Nim's Island	Alice	Film
2009	Accidents Happen	Katrina Post	Film
2009	Charlie & Boots	Jess	Film
2012	Island	Hanna	Short
2013	The Inheritance	Gitty	Short
2013	Louder than Words	Julie Fareri	Film
2014	Unbroken	Beautiful Young Blonde	Film
2014	Freeze-Frame	Flight Attendant	Short
2015	San Andreas	Natalie	Film
2016	Spin Out	Lucy	Film
2017	Bad Blood	Carrie	Film
2020	Reaching Distance	Mo	Film

=== TV series ===
Year	Title	Role	Notes
2006–2008	The Sleepover Club	Charlie	26 episodes
2013	Cliffy	Vicki	TV movie
2018	Olivia Newton-John: Hopelessly Devoted to You	Young Olivia Newton-John	TV movie
2021	Amazing Grace	Tiff Adams	TV series
2022	Pieces of Her	Paralegal Sheila	TV series
2025	Good Cop/Bad Cop	Gina	2 episodes: "Explosions" & "Skeletons"
