= My Best Friend Bob =

Book by Georgie Ripper

My Best Friend, Bob
- Author: Georgie Ripper
- Illustrator: Georgie Ripper
- Language: English
- Genre: Children's
- Publisher: Macmillan Publishing
- Publication date: April 2003
- Publication place: United Kingdom
- Media type: Paperback
- ISBN: 0-333-96085-8

My Best Friend, Bob is a 2003 children's picture book written and illustrated by Georgie Ripper.

It was published in the United States under the title Brian and Bob: The Tale of Two Guinea Pigs. The book received the Macmillan Prize for Picture Book Illustration in 2003.

== Plot summary ==
Brian and Bob are guinea pigs who live in a cage in Pete's Pet Palace. One day they are separated, when Bob is sold and suddenly taken away from the pet shop. Brian is inconsolable as he now has no-one to play I-Spy with, and even a peanut cannot cheer him up. Misery sets in until he, too, is sold to the same owner as Bob, and the two guinea pigs are reunited in a touching final scene.

== Reception ==
In a mixed review, Kirkus Reviews said, "An improbable tale, but a happily-ever-after one, so young readers will suspend their disbelief as they pull for the reunion of Ripper's guinea pig protagonists. Narrative and story architecture aren't Ripper's strong suits--left to them alone, she'd be wise to fold her hand--but she trumps readers with her winsome artwork: it's not easy to convincingly make a guinea pig scowl or to cross its arms in a huff, but it's visual magic when it works, and Ripper does it with aplomb." School Librarian reviewed the book.

Elizabeth Ward of The Washington Post called the book a "soon-to-be classic", comparing it to Anne Mazer's 1991 book The Salamander Room. She said both books are heart-rending to kids and educate them about what is essential for pets. She concluded that the scene where the guinea pigs Brian and Bob meet each other again is "among the most heartwarming denouements to be found in recent children's literature". Books for Keeps's Martin Salisbury agreed, stating, "The ensuing happy reunion concludes a book whose success is built on the totally convincing visual characterisation of the animals. Their facial expressions, gesture and movement are all spot on. The image of the dejected Brian, lying in his food bowl, idly flicking a peanut in the air, is a particular delight." Publishers Weekly praised the book, saying, "Ripper's unadorned prose and pared-down watercolor compositions eloquently describe the joy of close friendship and the sorrow that comes from its loss."

Calling the book "a charmingly illustrated tale", Rocky Mount Telegram's Mae Woods Bell said, "this human wasn't able to resist this endearing little tale of friendship and Ripper's illustrations". The Scotsman review Kathryn Ross stated the book was "a funny, heart-warming classic". The Herald said, "Illustrations and text combine powerfully to heighten anxiety as we wonder if the friends will meet again. The ending is suitably cathartic." The Noblesville Ledger found that "children in first and second grades love this book". Jean Westmoore of The Buffalo News praised the book, saying, "The expressive illustrations bring to life the different personalities of Brian and Bob", while Susan Nowak of St Albans & Harpenden Review said "it is Georgie's gorgeous larger-than-life pictures that really make the book".
