= Went Up the Hill =

2024 Australian thriller film

- U.S theatrical release poster
- Directed by: Samuel Van Grinsven
- Written by: Samuel Van Grinsven; Jory Anast
- Produced by: Kristina Ceyton; Samantha Jennings; Vicky Pope
- Starring: Dacre Montgomery; Vicky Krieps
- Cinematography: Tyson Perkins
- Edited by: Dany Cooper
- Music by: Hanan Townshend
- Production companies: POP Film; Causeway Films
- Distributed by: Greenwich Entertainment
- Release date: 5 September 2024 (TIFF)
- Running time: 100 minutes
- Countries: Australia; New Zealand
- Language: English
- Box office: $36,326

Went Up the Hill is a 2024 psychological drama film directed by Samuel Van Grinsven. The film stars Dacre Montgomery as Jack, a man returning to his native New Zealand to attend the funeral of his birth mother, from whom he was taken away and placed into foster care; he meets his mother's widow Jill (Vicky Krieps) for the first time, only for his mother to return in spirit form and inhabit both Jack and Jill, using each of their bodies to speak to the other.

The cast also includes Sarah Peirse, Arlo Green and Finlay Grey.

== Cast ==
- Dacre Montgomery as Jack
  - Finlay Grey as Young Jack
- Vicky Krieps as Jill
- Sarah Peirse as Helen
- Arlo Green as Ben
- Ally Xue as Veronica

== Production ==
The film's casting was first announced in fall 2022, with the film shooting on location in New Zealand in 2023.

The film's closing theme song, "Jill", was written and performed by Krieps. According to Krieps, she has maintained a practice for a number of years of writing a song about each film character she played, as a way to process and "exorcise" her emotions about the role, but "Jill" marked the first time that the filmmaker had actually placed her song in the movie.

== Distribution ==
The film premiered as a special presentation at the 2024 Toronto International Film Festival. Following the screening, Krieps performed the song "Jill" live in the theatre, accompanied by New Zealand singer-songwriter Merk.

The film was acquired for U.S. distribution by Greenwich Entertainment in December 2024. It opened for a limited theatre release on August 15, 2025.

== Critical response ==
On the review aggregator website Rotten Tomatoes, 67% of 49 critics' reviews are positive, with an average rating of 6.1/10. The website's consensus reads: "Heavy on mood and light on answers, Went Up the Hill is a heady ghost story that weaves an intoxicating spell for those patient enough to surrender to its languid rhythms." Metacritic, which uses a weighted average, assigned the film a score of 60 out of 100, based on 8 critics, indicating "mixed or average" reviews.

Caryn James of The Hollywood Reporter favourably reviewed the film, writing that "Van Grinsven’s aesthetic choices mirror the mood of the story, and the eeriness comes as much from his technique as it does from any plot turn. At the start, the sound effects by Robert Mackenzie might be wind but also might double as a moan or howl. Especially at the beginning, the cinematographer, Tyson Perkins, plays with focus. The foreground and background shift at times to create a sense of disorientation. And Sherree Philips’ production design is understated and effective."
