= Lucy Diamond =

English author

Sue Mongredien (born 1970) better known by the pen name Lucy Diamond, is an English author of female lead fiction.

== Biography ==
She grew up in Nottingham, and studied English Literature at Leeds University. After graduating, she lived in London for a few years and worked in the publishing industry.

Mongredien also worked with BBC and lived for some time in Brighton. She now lives in Bath with her family.

Her first book, Any Way You Want Me, was published by Pan Macmillan in 2007. She has sold 907,678 print books in the UK for £4.2m, according to Nielsen BookScan.

In 2011, her novel Sweet Temptations was shortlisted for the Melissa Nathan Award for Comedy Romance.

In 2021, after 14 years with Pan MacMillan, Mongredien moved to Quercus.

Mongredien has also authored several children's books, including books in The Sleepover Club series, the Rainbow Magic series, the Oliver Moon series, and the Captain Cat series.

== Bibliography ==
- On a Beautiful Day
- The Promise
- An Almost Perfect Holiday
- Any Way You Want Me
- Over You
- Hens Reunited
- Sweet Temptation
- The Beach Café
- Summer with My Sister
- Me and Mr Jones
- One Night in Italy
- Christmas at the Beach Café (short story)
- Christmas Gifts at the Beach Café (short story)
- The Year of Taking Chances
- Summer At Shell Cottage
- A Baby at the Beach Café (short story)
- The Secrets of Happiness
- The House of New Beginnings
- Something to Tell You
- Anything Can Happen
