= Shannon Lively =

Australian actor (born 1992)

- Born: Shannon James Lively; 4 May 1992 (age 34); Attadale, Western Australia
- Occupation: Actor
- Years active: 2006–present

Shannon James Lively (born 4 May 1992 in Attadale, Western Australia) is an Australian actor. His first television role was Declan in the second series of The Sleepover Club. He graduated in the class of 2009 from Corpus Christi College, Bateman and within that time he also finished working on the Australian television series entitled Wormwood. In 2010, Shannon Lively played Chub Pickles on the Australian miniseries; Cloudstreet, based on the popular novels by Tim Winton and aired in 2011.

Since 2011, Shannon Lively has been working with longtime friend Eduardo Martinez on various short films for the YouTube based Perth production company Space Bandidos Films. He has acted in the shorts Cream Pie, The Getaway Car, Hostile Hospitality, Knock Knock and Happy Slappy; all of which were directed by Eduardo Martinez, except Hostile Hospitality, which was directed by Vincent Lange. Currently the two are running a crowdfunding campaign on the Australian site Pozible, for a short film written by Shannon Lively titled A Full Stop. Eduardo Martinez will direct the film, while Shannon Lively portrays the main character, Johnny, a fictitious Australian punk musician.
