= Seven Types of Ambiguity (novel) =

2003 Australian novel by Elliot Perlman

- First edition
- Author: Elliot Perlman
- Language: English
- Genre: Novel
- Publisher: Picador
- Publication date: 2003
- Publication place: Australia
- Media type: Print paperback
- Pages: 607 pp
- ISBN: 0330364235 (first edition, paperback)
- Preceded by: Three Dollars
- Followed by: The Street Sweeper

Seven Types of Ambiguity is a 2003 novel by Australian writer Elliot Perlman.

== Plot summary ==
The novel is narrated by seven different characters whose lives intersect in various ways. The first of these, Alex Klima, is a Czech psychiatrist who has been hired to treat Simon for his depression. Simon is obsessed with his ex-lover Anna, and it is this obsession that leads him in a downward spiral. He takes a child from school but the child is found a few hours later. The boy is the son of Anna and the police wonder if the case is more complex than it first appears.

== Awards ==
- 2004 shortlisted Commonwealth Writers Prize — South East Asia and South Pacific Region — Best Book
- 2004 shortlisted Miles Franklin Literary Award
- 2004 shortlisted Queensland Premier's Literary Awards — Best Fiction Book

== Reviews ==
Kate Kellaway in The Guardian noted that "Perlman's novel is a colossal achievement, a complicated, driven, marathon of a book...The prose is lucid and intense...At the end, in a comprehensive, an almost Shakespearian way, Perlman picks up every loose thread and knots it. And there is almost as much satisfaction in this as there was at the extraordinary beginning. One learns all the things one has most keenly wanted to know from a fresh character, at a new, transformative remove."

In The Sydney Morning Herald Andrew Reimer was not as impressed: "His seriousness is beyond question. He is obviously dismayed by the corrosion of public values - corporate greed and excess, the dismantling of public health and education, the failings of the criminal justice system and even the ruinous influence of deconstruction on the study and appreciation of literature. The impact of what might have been an incisive vision of our world is dissipated, however, by this novel's excessive length, by its structure and by the almost unrelieved uniformity of voice."

- The New York Times

== Television series ==
A six-part series based on the novel was screened on ABC Television in 2017.
