= Cloudstreet (miniseries) =

2011 Australian television miniseries

- Created by: Tim Winton, adapted with Ellen Fontana
- Written by: Tim Winton; Ellen Fontana
- Directed by: Matthew Saville
- Starring: Essie Davis; Stephen Curry; Todd Lasance; Emma Booth; Shannon Lively; Kerry Fox; Geoff Morrell; Callan McAuliffe
- Country of origin: Australia
- Original language: English
- No. of episodes: 3

Production
- Producers: Greg Haddrick; Brenda Pam; Della Churchill (Assoc)
- Running time: 120 minutes
- Production company: Screentime

Original release
- Network: Showcase; Foxtel
- Release: 22 May – 5 June 2011

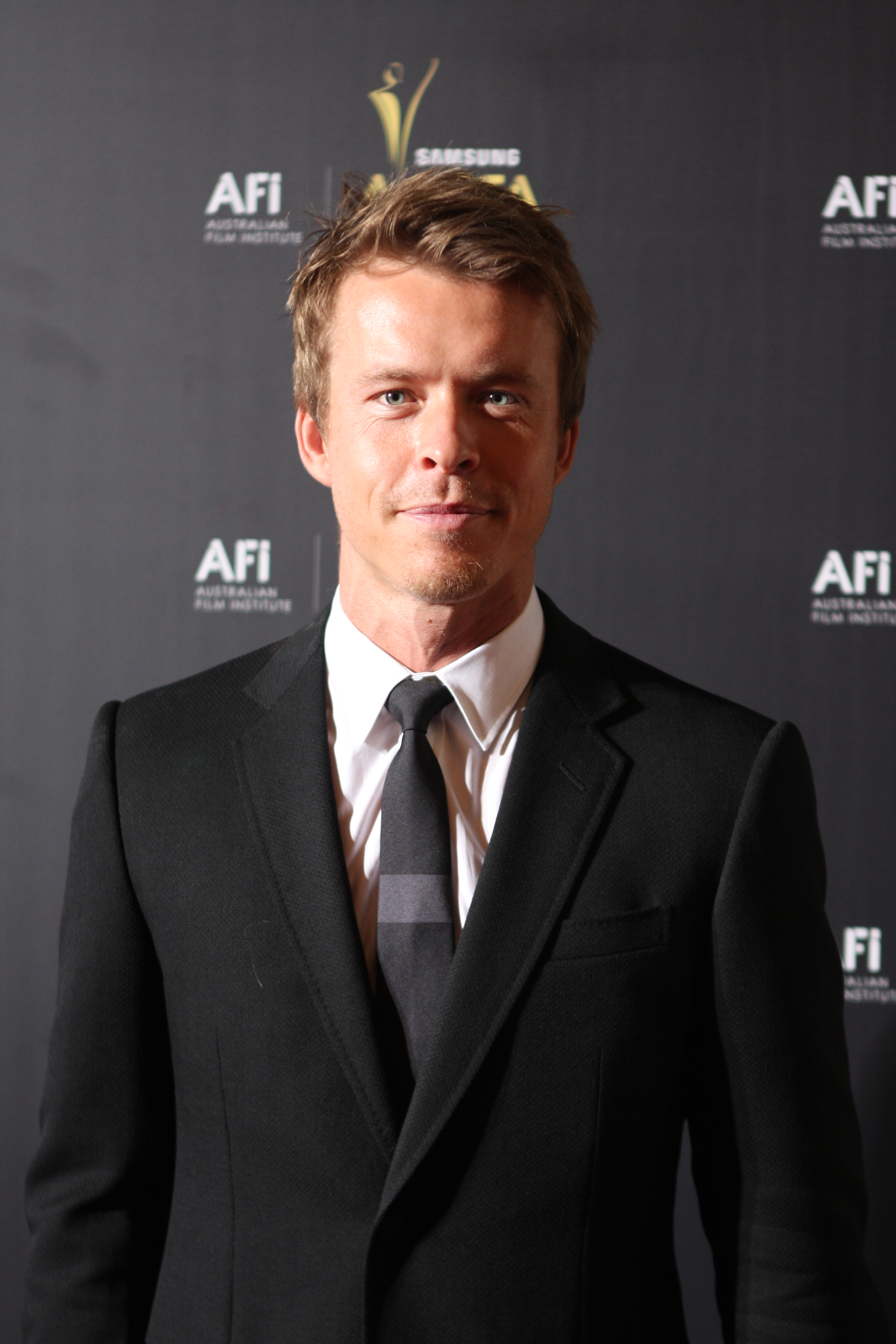
Tod Lasance

Cloudstreet is an Australian television drama miniseries for the Showcase subscription television channel, which first screened from 22 May 2011, in three parts. It is an adaptation of Cloudstreet, an award-winning novel by Australian author Tim Winton. It was filmed in 2010 in Perth, Western Australia, with Matthew Saville as the director, and script written by Tim Winton and Ellen Fontana.

== Plot and context ==
After separate personal tragedies, two families flee their rural lives to share a "great continent of a house", Cloudstreet, in the Perth suburb of West Leederville. The two families are very different; the Lambs find meaning in industry and in God's grace; the Pickles, in luck. Although at first the two families do not warm to each other, their separate paths and search for meaning in life ends with the uniting of the two families.

Cloudstreet is set in the mid-1940s to late 1950s. Although the families are influenced by world events, the story focuses on their domestic and personal lives. A recurring motif in the series involves the stolen generations of Aboriginal children, some of whom had been harshly treated in the house the two families now inhabit.

== Cast ==
=== The Pickles ===
- Dolly Pickles - Essie Davis
- Sam Pickles - Stephen Curry
- Rose Pickles - Emma Booth
- Young Rose Pickles - Lara Robinson
- Ted Pickles - Sean Keenan
- Young Ted Pickles - Will Mattock
- Chub Pickles - Shannon Lively
- Young Chub Pickles - Reece Sardelic

=== The Lambs ===
- Lester Lamb - Geoff Morrell
- Oriel Lamb - Kerry Fox
- Fish Lamb - Hugo Johnstone-Burt
- Young Fish Lamb - Tom Russell
- Quick Lamb - Todd Lasance
- Young Quick Lamb - Callan McAuliffe
- Young Hat Lamb - Freya Tingley
- Hat Lamb - Siobhan Dow-Hall
- Young Elaine Lamb - Annie Smith
- Elaine Lamb - Sarah McKellar
- Lon Lamb - Adam Sollis
- Red Lamb - Amanda Woodhams

=== Additional cast ===
- Narration by Ron Haddrick
- Greg McNeill as Trainer
- Milly Haddrick as Trainer's Daughter
- Ben Mortley as Gerry Clay
- Bruce Spence as Pig
- Kelton Pell as Bob Crab
- Shaquita Nannup as Florrie
- Billie-Jean Hamlet as Ruby
- Michelle Stanley as Mrs Johnson
- Julia Moody as Mrs Tisborn
- Anna Bauert as Alma
- Sarah Louella as Darlene
- Natalie Holmwood as Merle
- Melanie Munt as Mrs Clay
- Oliver Ackland as Toby Raven
- Ethan Thomas as Geoffrey Birch
- Laura Fairclough as Lucy Wentworth
- David Bowers as Earl Blunt
- Helen Doig as May Blunt
- Richard Adams as Spinner
- Jodie Mead as Aboriginal Woman
- Sean Walsh as Bloke
- Matthew Elverd as Bloke
- Angelique Malcolm as Housewife
- John Atkinson as Banjo player

== Production ==
It is an adaptation of Cloudstreet, an award-winning novel by Australian author Tim Winton. It was filmed in 2010 in Perth, Western Australia, with Matthew Saville as the director, and script written by Tim Winton and Ellen Fontana.

Three generations of the Sydney-based Haddrick family were involved in the production of Cloudstreet: Ron Haddrick as the narrator; Greg Haddrick as producer; and Milly Haddrick as an actress.

== Release ==
The three-part series premiered in Australia on 22 May 2011.

The series was screened in the UK from January 2012, distributed by Sky Atlantic.

== Reception ==
David Knox from Tvtonight.com stated: "There are visuals, concepts and performances that surpass the usual small screen dramas which stick to pedestrian storytelling and talking heads. Cloudstreet is bursting with character, imagination and offers a cornucopia for the eye."

The Sydney Morning Herald's Brad Newsome wrote: "The production and costume designs are wonderful, as is the original music by Bryony Marks (who also provided the haunting score for Tangle). Director Matthew Saville (Noise, The King) and cinematographer Mark Wareham (Clubland, Answered by Fire) bring it all to vivid, entrancing life. Outstanding."
