= Georgie Ripper =

English children's book illustrator

Georgie Ripper (born London, 1977) is a children's book illustrator, who is best known for her work on the Rainbow Magic series of fairy books. She won the Macmillan Prize for Picture Book Illustration in 2000 with My Best Friend Bob and Little Brown Bushrat which she authored and illustrated. She has also illustrated A Dog Called Whatnot and Whatnot Takes Charge which were written by Linda Newbery.

== Life and career ==
She graduated from Anglia Ruskin University where she studied Illustration. Her books have sold over 10 million copies in the UK.

== Rainbow Magic ==
A publishing phenomenon, “Rainbow Magic” has sold 20+ million copies in 31 languages worldwide, including over 6 million books in print in the U.S. The series of books are highly collectible and regularly featured in children's bestseller lists.

== Awards ==
- Winner of The Macmillan Prize for Children's Illustration - 2000

== Published work ==
- The Rainbow Magic fairy series - Orchard Books, 2003 - 2008
- Little Brown Bushrat - Macmillan Publishers, April 2002
- My Best Friend Bob - Macmillan Publishers, April 2003
- A Dog Called Whatnot - Egmont UK, Sept 2005
- Whatnot Takes Charge - Egmont UK, Sept 2006
