= Nathan Coenen =

Australian actor

- Born: Nathan Coenen; 10 September 1992 (age 34); Perth, Australia
- Occupation: Actor
- Height: 1.5 m (4 ft 11 in)
- Awards: Young Artists Award in the Best Performance for a Leading Actor in a Short Film

Nathan Coenen (born 10 September 1992) is an Australian actor.

He is most well known for his work in The Sleepover Club 2, a TV series aired across Australia and Europe, as well as the short feature Tinglewood, which blitzed the festival season with success.

He was nominated for a Young Artists Award in the Best Performance for a Leading Actor in a Short Film, based on his work in Tinglewood.

He attended the John Curtin College of the Arts until 2009. He enrolled at Guildhall School of Music & Drama in 2012, graduating in 2015.
