= Seven Types of Ambiguity (TV series) =

Australian television series

- Based on: Seven Types of Ambiguity by Elliot Perlman
- Written by: Jacquelin Perske; Jonathan Gavin; Marieke Hardy
- Story by: Elliot Perlman
- Directed by: Glendyn Ivin; Ana Kokkinos; Matthew Saville
- Starring: Alex Dimitriades; Leeanna Walsman; Xavier Samuel; Andrea Demetriades; Hugo Weaving
- Theme music composer: Stephen Rae; Jonathan Wilson
- Country of origin: Australia
- Original language: English
- No. of seasons: 1
- No. of episodes: 6

Production
- Executive producer: Tony Ayres
- Producer: Amanda Higgs
- Production locations: Melbourne, Australia
- Cinematography: Bonnie Elliot
- Editors: Rodrigo Balart; Anne Carter; Ken Sollows
- Running time: 55 minutes
- Production company: Matchbox Pictures

Original release
- Network: ABC
- Release: 13 April – 18 May 2017

Seven Types of Ambiguity is an Australian television drama series on the ABC first screened on 13 April 2017. The six-part series is based on Seven Types of Ambiguity, a 2003 novel by Australian writer Elliot Perlman.

The series is produced by Tony Ayres and Amanda Higgs and written by Jacquelin Perske, Jonathan Gavin and Marieke Hardy. It is directed by Glendyn Ivin, Ana Kokkinos and Matthew Saville. Despite being announced to premiere in 2016, it was later delayed to air in 2017.

== Cast ==
- Alex Dimitriades as Joe Marin
- Leeanna Walsman as Anna Marin
- Xavier Samuel as Simon Heywood
- Andrea Demetriades as Angela
- Hugo Weaving as Dr Alex Klima
- Anthony Hayes as Mitch
- Susie Porter as Gina Serkin
- Sarah Peirse as Detective Staszic
- Tony Briggs as Detective Threlfall
- Harrison Molloy as Sam Marin
- Nicholas Bell as Gorman
- Janet Andrewartha as Kathleen
- Jacek Koman as Gideon
- Alex Papps as Robert Henshaw
- Andrew McFarlane as Donald Sheere

== Episodes ==
No.	Title	Directed by	Written by	Original release date	Australia viewers
1	"Joe"	Glendyn Ivin	Jacquelin Perske	13 April 2017	502,000
2	"Alex"	Glendyn Ivin	Jacquelin Perske	20 April 2017	437,000
3	"Angela"	Matthew Saville	Marieke Hardy	27 April 2017	397,000
4	"Mitch"	Matthew Saville	Jonathan Gavin	4 May 2017	341,000
5	"Gina"	Ana Kokkinos	Jacquelin Perske	11 May 2017	355,000
6	"Anna"	Ana Kokkinos	Jacquelin Perske	18 May 2017	355,000

== Arabic adaptation ==
In June 2024, it was announced that beIN Media Group’s TOD was developing their own version of the six-part ABC series – Australian series, Seven Types of Ambiguity the acclaimed novel by Australian author Elliot Perlman, with Sally Wally along, with their production company, S Productions in partnership with NBCUniversal Formats. The series was greenlit for a ten-episodes of first season, beIN Media Group’s TOD S Productions collaborate on their first drama series: titled “Mirage” or alternately (“Sarab”). The Arabic series premiered on the streaming platform TOD on January 7, 2025.
