= Samuel Van Grinsven =

New Zealand-born Australian film director and screenwriter

Samuel Van Grinsven is a New Zealand-born Australian film director and screenwriter, whose debut feature film Sequin in a Blue Room was released in 2019.

A graduate of the Australian Film, Television and Radio School, Van Grinsven made Sequin in a Blue Room as his graduation project. Centred on the coming-of-age of a gay teenager, the film was based on Van Grinsven's own experiences growing up queer in a conservative part of Australia. The film premiered in June 2019 at the 66th Sydney Film Festival, where it was the winner of the Audience Award for best Australian narrative feature. It was an AACTA Award nominee for Best Indie Film at the 9th AACTA Awards, and received commercial distribution in Australia in 2020 before going into wider international distribution in 2021.

His second feature film, Went Up the Hill, premiered at the 2024 Toronto International Film Festival.
