= The Sleepover Club =

Children's book series

- Country: England
- Genre: Family/Children's fiction
- No. of books: 54

The Sleepover Club is a series of children's books by authors Rose Impey, Narinder Dhami, Lorna Read, Fiona Cummings, Louis Catt, Sue Mongredien (aka Lucy Diamond), Angie Bates, Ginny Deals, Harriet Castor and Jana Novotny Hunter. It has also been adapted into a children's television programme. While the books were set in Cuddington, Leicester, England, the television show was set in the fictional Australian beachside suburb of Crescent Bay. The books revolve around five young girls who are part of a club in which they sleepover at each other's houses at least once a week. The television series do not portray the same stories as the books with the possible exception of the first episode which loosely resembled the story where the girls try and set up their 'Brown Owl' with their school care-taker.

The girls' names are Francesca "Frankie" Thomas, Rosie Cartwright, Felicity "Fliss" Sidebotham (Later "Proudlove"), Lyndsey "Lyndz" Collins and Laura "Kenny" McKenzie. Their rivals are two, snobbish girls in their class named Emma Hughes (nicknamed "The Queen") and Emily Berryman (nicknamed "The Goblin"). This pair are also referred to as the Gruesome Twosome or "The M&Ms." There are 54 books:

1. The Sleepover Club at Frankie’s
2. The Sleepover Club at Lyndsey’s
3. The Sleepover Club at Felicity’s
4. The Sleepover Club at Rosie’s
5. The Sleepover Club at Kenny’s
6. Starring the sleepover club
7. The Sleepover Girls Go Pop (A.K.A Sleepover Girls Go Spice)
8. The 24-Hour Sleepover Club
9. The Sleepover Club Sleeps Out
10. Happy Birthday Sleepover Club
11. Sleepover Girls on Horseback
12. Sleepover in Spain
13. Sleepover on Friday 13th
14. The Sleepover Girls Go Camping
15. Sleepover Girls Go Detective
16. Sleepover Girls Go Designer
17. The Sleepover Girls Surf the Net
18. Sleepover Girls on Screen
19. Sleepover Girls and Friends
20. Sleepover Girls on the Catwalk
21. Sleepover Girls go for Goal
22. Sleepover Girls Go Babysitting
23. Sleepover Girls Go Snowboarding
24. Happy New Year, Sleepover Club
25. Sleepover Girls Go Green (A.K.A Sleepover Club 2000)
26. We Love You Sleepover Club
27. Vive le Sleepover Club
28. Sleepover Club Eggstavaganza
29. Emergency Sleepover
30. Sleepover Girls on the Range
31. The Sleepover Club Bridesmaids
32. Sleepover Club See Stars
33. Sleepover Club Blitz
34. Sleepover Girls in the Ring
35. Sari Sleepover
36. Merry Christmas Sleepover Club
37. The Sleepover Club Down Under
38. Sleepover Girls Go Splash
39. Sleepover Girls Go Karting
40. Sleepover Girls Go Wild!
41. The Sleepover Club at the Carnival
42. The Sleepover Club at the Beach
43. Sleepover Club Vampires
44. sleepoverclub.com
45. Sleepover Girls Go Dancing
46. The Sleepover Club on the Farm
47. Sleepover Girls Go Gymnastic
48. Sleepover Girls on the Ball
49. Sleepover Club Witches
50. Sleepover Club Ponies
51. Sleepover Girls on Safari
52. Sleepover Club Makeover
53. Sleepover Girls Go Surfing
54. Sleepover Girls go Treasure Hunting
