= Three Dollars =

- Theatrical release poster
- Directed by: Robert Connolly
- Screenplay by: Robert Connolly; Elliot Perlman
- Based on: Three Dollars by Elliot Perlman
- Produced by: John Maynard
- Starring: David Wenham; Sarah Wynter; Frances O'Connor
- Cinematography: Tristan Milani
- Edited by: Nick Meyers
- Music by: Alan John
- Distributed by: Dendy Films
- Release date: 21 April 2005
- Running time: 118 minutes
- Country: Australia
- Language: English

Three Dollars is a 2005 Australian film directed by Robert Connolly and starring David Wenham, Sarah Wynter, and Frances O'Connor. It was based on a 1998 novel of the same name by Elliot Perlman. It won the 2005 Australian Film Institute Award for Best Adapted Screenplay.

== Plot ==
The film and book tell the story of Eddie (David Wenham), a principled man with a seemingly stable and happy life. He has a wife, the academic Tanya (Frances O'Connor), a daughter, Abby (Joanna Hunt-Prokhovnik), is paying off a house and has a job as a government land assessor. Yet when the forces of economic and social change threaten this, he realises just how fragile his reality and security is. After losing his job, he checks his bank balance and realises he has only the 'three dollars' of the title to his name.

Eddie's life also becomes entwined with that of childhood friend Amanda (Sarah Wynter), whom he unfailingly runs into every nine-and-a-half years, and every time he has just three dollars.

The novel and film are set largely in Melbourne, at a time when the policies of economic liberalisation were gaining credence in Australian politics and were arguably affecting many lives similarly to Eddie and Tanya. They explore the choices we make between what we have and what might be.

== Cast ==
- David Wenham as Eddie
- Frances O'Connor as Tanya Harnovey
- Joanna Hunt-Prokhovnik as Abby
- Sarah Wynter as Amanda
- Robert Menzies
- Julia Blake as Tanya's Mother
- Tyler Coppin as Giles
- David Roberts as Gerard
- Terry Norris as Alfred Price
- Elspeth Ballantyne as Eddie's Mother

== Reception ==
The film has received better reviews in Australia and New Zealand than in the United States. Generally, performances, cinematography, and observational details received praise, while direction and story flow received criticism.

In New Zealand, The Lumiere Reader gave the film 5/5 stars as an "engaging and accessible film which gives the audience plenty to mull over. The cast all bring their roles to life in a fresh, believable fashion and the direction, whilst smart, is not overtly in your face." On the Australian At The Movies Margaret Pomeranz gave the film 3.5/5 and David Stratton gave 4.5/5 stars. TripleJ's Megan Spencer gave the film 4/5 stars, describing the film as "an authentic, intelligent and entertaining snapshot of contemporary middle class life," and, "it does have flaws, however: the key plot device of meeting Amanda over time amounts to...not very much. The ethical dilemma Eddie faces at work is dropped like a hot potato and there were some superfluous scenes that could have easily been trimmed from the cut, which would have made dramatically stronger." Andrew Urban of Australia's Urban Cinefile wrote: "Three Dollars is such a strange film I am tempted to read the novel [...] to see if the tantalising episodes of Eddie's life captured here find some cohesion through the inner voice of literature. The cinematic arts of the film are beyond doubt: Robert Connolly is a natural master of film, and he makes this a fascinating work, filled with little treasures of observation, performance and technique." Louise Keller wrote, "Wenham is excellent as always," and "there's plenty to relate to in Three Dollars, and the moments, like domestic squabbles about whether dinner is a casserole or a stew, ring very true. But at nearly two hours, the film feels overlong."

The film received some mild recommendations, and some harshly negative reviews in the United States. Variety found the film dark, but "far from humorless. An intimate drama of a family man recalling happier times while contemplating a bleak future, this adaptation of Elliot Perlman's 1998 novel shifts uneasily at times around weighty themes, but its essential humanism still strikes chords." However, the San Francisco Chronicle called it "a depressing muddle," and, "a person could get a headache trying to figure out" the film. Worse, Film Threat summed up: "I wanted to like this film," but "throw in some homeless people, a few dogs and some really pointless coincidences, and you remember why real life sometimes makes for a boring film."

=== Awards ===
The film won the following awards:

- 2005 AFI – Award for Best Screenplay, Adapted
- 2005 Film Critics Circle of Australia – Award for Best Screenplay, Adapted

Nominations

- 2005 AFI Young Actors Award – Joanna Hunt-Prokhovnik (Nominated)
- 2005 AFI Best Actress in a Leading Role – Frances O'Connor (Nominated)
- 2005 AFI Best Actor in a Supporting Role – Robert Menzies (Nominated)

== DVD ==
The DVD release was a two-disc set, produced in 2004, released 15 February 2006. Extras included deleted scenes, storyboards, interviews, three commentary tracks (director, author, and creative team), theatrical Trailer, interviews with the director and lead actors, deleted scenes, musical highlights from the score, storyboard comparisons with commentary, photo gallery, an extra short film (Winged Plague), an essay ("Human Cost of Economic Rationalism"), audio-only interview by Elliot Perlman of Tony Wilson. The DVD set received an excellent review for its audio, video, and features, in aggregate, 4/5 stars.

== Box office ==
Three Dollars grossed $1,871,447 at the box office in Australia.

== See also ==
- Cinema of Australia
