= A Few Best Men =

2011 film directed by Stephan Elliott

- Australian release poster
- Directed by: Stephan Elliott
- Written by: Dean Craig
- Produced by: Antonia Barnard; Gary Hamilton; Laurence Malkin; Share Stallings
- Starring: Xavier Samuel; Kris Marshall; Kevin Bishop; Rebel Wilson; Olivia Newton-John
- Cinematography: Stephen F. Windon
- Edited by: Sue Blainey
- Music by: Guy Gross
- Production companies: Quickfire Films; Screen Australia; Screen NSW
- Distributed by: Icon Film Distribution (Australia); Buena Vista International (United Kingdom)
- Release dates: 14 October 2011 (MVFF); 26 January 2012 (Australia); 31 August 2012 (United Kingdom)
- Running time: 96 minutes
- Countries: Australia; United Kingdom
- Language: English
- Budget: A$14 million
- Box office: $15.5 million

A Few Best Men is a 2011 comedy film written by Dean Craig and directed by Stephan Elliott. The film stars Xavier Samuel as a young groom heading to the Australian Blue Mountains with his three best men for his wedding. A sequel, A Few Less Men, was released in 2017.

== Plot ==
When David Locking proposes to his girlfriend Mia Ramme a week after they meet in Tuvalu, he rounds up his three best friends to attend his wedding in Australia as best men; however, all hell breaks loose when the three of them accidentally steal drugs, are chased by a mobster, and get the father-in-law's sheep stoned.

== Cast ==
- Xavier Samuel as David Locking
- Kris Marshall as Tom
- Kevin Bishop as Graham
- Rebel Wilson as Daphne Ramme
- Olivia Newton-John as Barbara Ramme
- Laura Brent as Mia Ramme
- Jonathan Biggins as Jim Ramme
- Tim Draxl as Luke
- Steve Le Marquand as Ray
- Elizabeth Debicki as Maureen
- Phillip Scott as Celebrant Robin Arthur

== Soundtrack ==
Universal Music Australia released A Few Best Man: Original Motion Picture Soundtrack and Remixes on 20 January 2012. The film soundtrack is sung primarily by Olivia Newton-John.

== Release ==
A Few Best Men premiered at the Mill Valley Film Festival in San Rafael, California on 14 October 2011. The film was released in Australia on 26 January 2012, and in the United Kingdom on 31 August 2012.

=== Critical reception ===
A Few Best Men was mostly met with negative reviews, earning an approval rating of 18% on Rotten Tomatoes, based on 39 reviews, with an average score of 3.6/10.

However, David Stratton and Margaret Pomeranz both gave the film four stars on At the Movies. Stratton commented that "I think all the performances are nice. Olivia Newton John is hilarious...not many films make me laugh out loud these days and this made me laugh out loud quite a few times." Pomeranz stated that "Stephan Elliott's been able to ground it so that there is a reality to the silliness so that you're laughing from a really healthy and witty base in a lot of way."

Fiona Williams of SBS noted that the film was as "funny as a funeral", awarding one star out of five, commenting that "Like a bad wedding reception, A Few Best Men is overlong by at least an hour, and the flimsy plot groans under its own weight."

Despite poor reviews, A Few Best Men was nominated for an AACTA Award for Best Original Music Score.

=== Box Office ===
A Few Best Men was opened on 235 screens in Australia, making $1.9 million at the local box office in its opening weekend, the third highest grossing film of the week. The film eventually made $5,296,692 at the domestic box office, the fourth most successful Australian film of the year.
