= Narinder Dhami =

British children's author

Narinder Dhami (born 1958 in Wolverhampton) is a British children's author.

== Early life ==
Dhami's father was an Indian immigrant from the Punjab who arrived in the UK in 1954, and her mother is English. She grew up in a multi-cultural environment, with Asian Indian and western cultures both major influences in her life, and was educated at Wolverhampton Girls' High School and then Birmingham University, where she graduated in 1980.

== Career ==
Dhami started working as a teacher, and for the next nine years she taught in primary and secondary schools in Essex and in the London borough of Waltham Forest. During this time, she began writing stories for teenage magazines, and contributed many photo-stories to the now-defunct Jackie magazine, published by DC Thomson.

Eventually she gave up teaching for a full-time writing job. For the last few years, she has been writing contemporary realistic fiction about children growing up in Britain. Her Babes quartet about three British Asian girls is extremely popular with girls between 9 and 14 years of age. She writes a wide range of children's books for pre-teens on other subjects and now increasingly for older teens too. Her characters reflect the British urban ethnic mix.

Books for 2009 included a teen thriller Bang, Bang You're Dead! May 2009, which won or was shortlisted for a large number of book awards in 2010, and the first book in a series of six for 9+ readers called The Beautiful Game about girls' football. A further four books in the series were published in 2010 and the last of the six appeared in Jan 2011.

Dhami is one of the authors of the internationally successful Rainbow Magic series, written under the name of Daisy Meadows. Her most famous and biggest selling book was Bend It Like Beckham, a novelisation of the film.

Now she lives in Shropshire with her husband and her cats, continuing her writing career. A book that came out in March 2015 is a thriller for 9-13 year olds called 'Thirteen Hours', It was published by Random House.

== Bibliography ==
Around 300 books published to date. Key titles include the following:

- The Beautiful Game - Team Jasmin (Orchard 2010)
- The Beautiful Game - Golden Girl Grace (Orchard 2010)
- The Beautiful Game - Georgie's War (Orchard 2010)
- The Beautiful Game - Lauren's Best Friend (Orchard 2010)
- The Beautiful Game - Hannah's Secret (Orchard 2009)
- The New Adventures of the Wishing Chair (various) (Egmont)
- Bang, Bang, You're Dead! (Corgi Books)
- Angel Face (Collins)
- Changing Places (OUP)
- Annie’s Game
- Animal Crackers
- Bindi Babes
- Bollywood Babes
- Bhangra Babes
- Sunita’s Secret
- Dani’s Diary
- Bend It Like Beckham (2002) (Hodder Headline)
- Superstar Babes (2008)
- Cinderella (2003) (Puffin Books)
- Lady and the Tramp (2003) (Puffin Books)
- Sleeping Beauty (2003) (Puffin Books)
- The Aristocats (2003) (Puffin Books)
- The Jungle Book (2003) (Puffin Books)
- The Lion King (2003) (Puffin Books)
- 101 Dalmatians (2004) (Puffin Books)
- Alice in Wonderland (2004) (Puffin Books)
- Bambi (2004) (Puffin Books)
- Pinocchio (2004) (Puffin Books)
- Beauty and the Beast (2004) (Puffin Books)
- Snow White (2004) (Puffin Books)
- Cinderella: A Princess at Last (2004) (Puffin Books)
- Jasmine (2004) (Puffin Books)
- Tinker Bell: Peter Pan and Never Land (2004) (Puffin Books)
- The Little Mermaid (2005) (Puffin Books)
- Robin Hood (2005) (Puffin Books)
- The Hunchback of Notre Dame (2005) (Puffin Books)

All books published by Random House unless otherwise specified.
