= Elliot Perlman =

Australian author and barrister (born 1964)

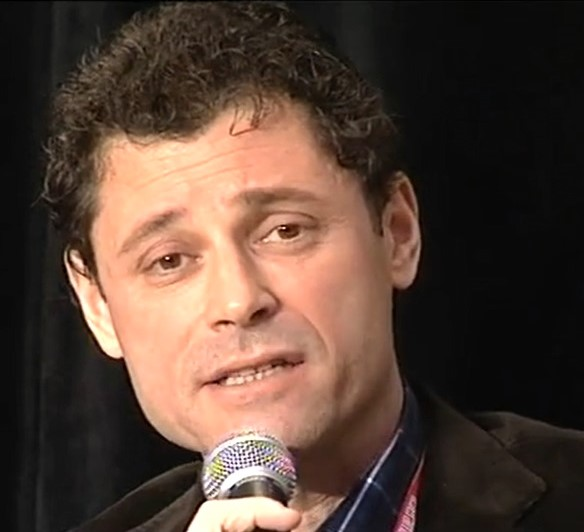
- Perlman in 2013
- Born: 1964 (age 61–62); Melbourne, Victoria, Australia
- Occupation: Novelist
- Writing career
- Notable awards: Age Book of the Year Award

Elliot Perlman (born 7 May 1964) is an Australian author and barrister. He has written four novels (Three Dollars, Seven Types of Ambiguity, The Street Sweeper and Maybe the Horse Will Talk), one short story collection (The Reasons I Won't Be Coming) and a book for children.

== Life ==
Perlman is the son of second-generation Jewish Australians of East European descent. He studied law at Monash University in Melbourne, graduating in 1989. He was called to the Bar in 1997, but while working as a judge's associate in the early 1990s he started writing short stories. He lives in Melbourne.

== Writing career ==
In 1994 he won The Age Short Story Award for "The Reasons I Won't Be Coming", a short story that later gave the title to his first collection of short stories, published in 1999. In 1998, his first novel, Three Dollars, was published. It won The Age Book of the Year and the Betty Trask Prize. His second novel, Seven Types of Ambiguity, was shortlisted for the Miles Franklin Award, Australia's most prestigious literary award, in 2004. Perlman's third novel, The Street Sweeper, was published in 2011. In an interview in 2001 he named Graham Greene as one of the writers who inspire him, describing Greene as "a master of beautifully crisp, clean and spare prose".

== Themes and style ==
His work "condemns the economic rationalism that destroys the humanity of ordinary people when they are confronted with unemployment and poverty." This is not surprising in a writer who admires Raymond Carver and Graham Greene because they "write with quite a strong moral centre and a strong sense of compassion." However, he says, "Part of my task is to entertain readers. I don't want it to be propaganda at all. I don't think that for something to be political fiction it has to offer an alternative; I think just a social critique is enough." He describes himself, in fact, as being interested in "the essence of humanity" and argued that exploring this often means touching on political issues. Perlman often uses music, and song lyrics, in his work to convey an idea or mood, or to give a sense of who a character is. However, he recognises that this is "a bit of a risk because the less familiar the reader is with the song, the smaller the pay off."

== Adaptations ==
His novel Three Dollars was produced as a film in 2005. It was directed by Robert Connolly, and starred David Wenham and Frances O'Connor. Perlman and Connolly jointly adapted the novel.

A six-part series based on Seven Types of Ambiguity was screened on ABC Television in 2017.

== Awards and nominations ==
- 2019: Children's Peace Literature Award: shortlisted for The Adventures of Catvinkle
- 2012 Indie Book Awards Book of the Year – Fiction, winner for The Street Sweeper
- 2012: Miles Franklin Award: longlisted for The Street Sweeper
- 2005: Australian Film Institute (AFI) Awards, Best Adapted Screenplay: winner for Three Dollars
- 2005: Film Critics Circle of Australia, Best Screenplay – Adapted: winner for Three Dollars
- 2005: AWGIE Awards, Film Award, Feature: shortlisted for Three Dollars
- 2004: Commonwealth Writers Prize, South East Asia and South Pacific Region, Best Book: shortlisted for Seven Types of Ambiguity
- 2004: Queensland Premier's Literary Awards, Best Fiction Book: shortlisted for Seven Types of Ambiguity
- 2004: Miles Franklin Award: shortlisted for Seven Types of Ambiguity
- 2000: Arts Queensland Steele Rudd Australian Short Story Award: joint winner for The Reasons I Won't Be Coming
- 1999: Betty Trask Award for Commonwealth Writers Under 35 Years: winner for Three Dollars
- 1999: Queensland Premier's Literary Awards, Best Literary Work Advancing Public Debate: joint winner for Three Dollars
- 1999: Miles Franklin Award: shortlisted for Three Dollars
- 1998: The Age Book of the Year Award, Book of the Year: winner for Three Dollars
- 1998: The Age Book of the Year Award, Fiction Prize: winner for Three Dollars
- 1994: The Age Short Story Award: winner for The Reasons I Won't Be Coming

== Bibliography ==
=== Novels ===
- Three Dollars (1998)
- Seven Types of Ambiguity (2003)
- The Street Sweeper (2011)
- Maybe the Horse Will Talk (2019)

=== Short story collection ===
- The Reasons I Won't Be Coming (1999)

=== For children ===
- The Adventures of Catvinkle, illustrated by Laura Stitzel (2018)
- Catvinkle and the Missing Tulips, illustrated by Laura Stitzel (2020)
