= Three Dollars (novel) =

Book by Elliot Perlman

- Cover of 1998 Picador edition
- Author: Elliot Perlman
- Cover artist: Bland Design
- Language: English
- Genre: Novel
- Publisher: Picador
- Publication date: 1998
- Publication place: Australia
- Media type: Print (Paperback)
- Pages: 381pp
- ISBN: 0-330-42167-0
- OCLC: 156765358

Three Dollars is a 1998 novel by Australian writer Elliot Perlman. It is his first published novel. A movie of the same name based on the novel was released in 2005.

== Plot summary ==
The novel is set in Melbourne. The first-person narrator, Eddie Harnovey, is a chemical engineer, married to Tanya, an aspiring but ultimately uncontracted political science academic. Eddie is from middle class origins, his father being a clerk for a local council. His childhood friend Amanda, however, was a class above them. As a chemical engineer, her father wore starched cotton shirts while Eddie's father wore drip-dry poly-cotton shirts. Amanda's family banned Eddie from meeting her. Nevertheless, Eddie meets Amanda every nine and half years. The next time is as undergraduates, where Eddie notices her in a queue for more fashionable food than he is in the queue for. The next time is as fellow shoppers in a department store, as Eddie looks for formal wear for his marriage to Tanya. The next time he meets her is in much straitened circumstances. Downsized, jobless, and with only three dollars in his bank account, Eddie skips an appointment with Amanda - now an employment consultant - and ends up beaten unconscious protecting a friend of a now indigent man Eddie befriended while still solvent. Eddie's report on Amanda's father's smelter expansion was the reason Eddie was downsized. Amanda identifies Eddie from the appointment card he had in his shirt pocket.

== Movie adaptation ==
In 2005, the novel was adapted to a movie of the same name.
