= 1990 in Australian television =

== Events ==
- January – The 1990 Commonwealth Games in Auckland, New Zealand are broadcast on Seven Network.
- 27 January – Australian longest running children's Saturday morning series Saturday Disney along with music video program Video Smash Hits debut on Seven Network.
- 29 January – Welsh children's animated series Fireman Sam premieres on ABC.
- 29 January – Australian television and radio host Steve Vizard presents his very own national Tonight show titled Tonight Live with Steve Vizard which is shown five nights a week on Seven Network.
- 3 February – Paul Keane was ready to get axed from his long-running role as Des Clarke in Neighbours, but has instead opted to take a four-month hiatus and was expected to return in April. Keane's break from the show comes as cast morale is at an all-time low following the departure of several key cast members, but producers are confident that Des will return with some good storylines.
- 12 February – American children's animated series Teenage Mutant Ninja Turtles debuts on Seven Network.
- 13 February – ABC debuts a new current affairs program Lateline hosted by Kerry O'Brien.
- 16 February – Australian lifestyle and gardening series Gardening Australia debuts on ABC.
- 20 February – In Neighbours, Toby & Noelene Mangel depart.
- 23 February – In Neighbours, this was Bronwyn Davies' final episode.
- 28 February – In Neighbours, this was Hilary Robinson's final episode.
- 31 March – Neighbours Producers have chosen to write out the popular character of Sharon Davies – the on-screen sister to Rachel Friend's former character Bronwyn Davies, played by 19-year-old Jessica Muschamp said the exit of Neighbours may have been a "blessing in disguise." She finished her final credits in Neighbours in five weeks and after leaving the series, she went to English pantomime performances over Christmas and was considering mini-series and theatre roles in Australia.
- April – Jennifer Keyte becomes the first solo woman newsreader on a commercial network in Australia when Glenn Taylor leaves the Melbourne bureau of Seven News.
- 9 June – Neighbours star Linda Hartley has decided to leave the hit-turned-troubled 10 TV Australia soap opera after a behind-the-scenes battle between producers Grundy Television and 10 TV Australia. Hartley had requested for a hiatus from the series to allow time to travel overseas and to pursue an opportunity for a singing career including a recording contract with Sony Music Australia, but Grundys were not keen to renew her contract, claiming the show had exceeded its casting budget. However, budget cuts ran out, negotiations broke down again and Hartley has chosen to leave the series.
- 2 July – Canadian children's animated series Babar based on a series of children's books by Jean and Laurent de Brunhoff premieres on ABC.
- 15 July – After a long absence of six months, the Australian comedy series The Comedy Company returns on 10 TV Australia.
- 20 August - French children's animated series Bouli premieres on ABC.
- 3 September – Australian children's TV series Johnson and Friends debuts on ABC.
- 5 September – In Neighbours, this was Beverly Robinson's final episode.
- 7 September – In Neighbours Kerry Mangel was shot in the head while duck hunting by Mick Taylor, leaving Joe Mangel in Saw-styled screaming and crying. This was the final episode.
- 10 October – In Neighbours, this was Des Clarke's final episode.
- 9 November – Cartoon All-Stars to the Rescue, the American animated special program that warns children the danger of drugs and features famous cartoon characters from various animated TV shows alike, is simultaneously simulcast by Seven Network, Nine Network and 10 TV Australia (thus airing on all three major commercial television stations). The program was also introduced by Prime Minister Bob Hawke and his wife Hazel.
- 11 November – Australian comedy series The Comedy Company airs its final episode on 10 TV Australia before getting axed after very bad ratings and a failure to match the success of its 1988 season.
- 12 November – Australian children's TV series Johnson and Friends begins a second run and first ever repeat on ABC when it starts airing in the afternoons for the very first time ever. The series will be shown at 3:55 pm (which is usually the timeslot for airing 5 minute programs for children) dominating the 5 minute programming thus making Play School screening at 4:05 pm and the 4:30 pm programmes to push forward to 4:35 pm.
- 16 November – Hey Hey It's Saturday's Red Symons marries Elly Agotis in Melbourne in a Greek ceremony.
- December – The Seven Network wins the 1990 ratings year with a record of 35.6% share for Total People. The most watched program was Seven's AFL: 1990 AFL Grand Final.
- 8 December – Neighbours producers have announced that star Ashley Paske will not renew his contract with the troubled 10 TV Australia soap opera when it expires in January. He is expected to be seen on-air until May.
- 9 December – 1990 Neighbours movie-length finale: Joe Mangel shakes and kidnaps Sky Bishop from Eric Jensen (episode 1), Joe & Toby Mangel are arrested for shoplifting and kidnapping Sky Bishop, Tom Ramsay returns to Rsmsay Street after a three-and-a-half-year absence (episode 2), Paul Robinson proposes to Christina Aleesi, Glen Donnolly arrives and tells that Jim Robinson is his father (episode 3).
- 21 December – James Valentine presents the Australian weekday afternoon magazine series The Afternoon Show for the last time at 5:00 pm on ABC. The programme includes reruns of the French-American-Canadian animated series Inspector Gadget and Canadian action drama series Danger Bay (Both these shows haven't been airing on the ABC for a long time since most of the year).
- 22 December – Neighbours star Richard Norton has been informed by producers that they won't be renewing his contract with the troubled 10 TV Australia soap opera when it expires in February.
- 24 December – American animated special program Cartoon All-Stars to the Rescue gets repeated and airs for a second time airing on both Seven Network, Nine Network and 10 TV Australia once again.
- 31 December – Queensland becomes the second Aggregated market with local stations Sunshine Television (which now is Seven Queensland), WIN and QTV (in 2002 it became Southern Cross Ten, in 2016 it became Southern Cross Nine, now 10 Regional).

== Premieres ==
=== Domestic series ===
Program	Network	Debut date
Agro's Cartoon Connection	Seven Network	22 January
Saturday Disney	Seven Network	27 January
Video Smash Hits	Seven Network	27 January
The Super Sunday Show	Seven Network	28 January
Tonight Live with Steve Vizard	Seven Network	29 January
Family and Friends	Nine Network	7 February
Lateline	ABC TV	13 February
Gardening Australia	ABC TV	16 February
Facing Writers	ABC TV	26 February
The C Company	Nine Network	3 March
The Party Machine	ABC TV	12 March
Graham Kennedy's Funniest Home Video Show	Nine Network	29 March
Robbo's World	Nine Network	2 April
Skirts	Seven Network	18 April
The Greatest Tune on Earth	Seven Network	20 May
The Private War of Lucinda Smith	Nine Network	20 May
Elly & Jools	Nine Network	11 June
The Bugs Bunny Show	Nine Network	18 June
More Winners	ABC TV	1 July
Savage Indictment	ABC TV	1 July
Flair	Seven Network	1 August
Let the Blood Run Free	10 TV Australia	20 August
Johnson and Friends	ABC TV	3 September
Embassy	ABC TV	12 September
The Search for the World's Most Secret Animals	Nine Network	27 September
Jackaroo	Seven Network	7 October
The Girl from Tomorrow	Nine Network	30 October
Imparja National News	Imparja Television	1990
In Brisbane Today	Nine Network (Queensland only)	1990

=== International series ===
Program	Network	Debut date
(United States) The Popcorn Kid	Nine Network	1 January
(United Kingdom) / (United States) Max Headroom	Seven Network	2 January
(United Kingdom) Surgical Spirit	ABC TV	2 January
(United Kingdom) The Giddy Game Show	ABC TV	4 January
(United States) Hothouse	ABC TV	4 January
(United Kingdom) The Growing Pains of Adrian Mole	ABC TV	7 January
(United States) Lincoln	ABC TV	10 January
(United States) / (New Zealand) / (Canada) The Ray Bradbury Theatre	ABC TV	14 January
(United States) The New Adventures of Winnie the Pooh	Seven Network	20 January
(United Kingdom) Pinny's House	ABC TV	24 January
(Wales) Fireman Sam	ABC TV	29 January
(United States) The Story of the Dancing Frog	ABC TV	2 February
(United States) Murphy Brown	Nine Network	5 February
(United States) Doogie Howser M.D.	10 TV Australia	5 February
(United States) Dream Street	Seven Network	11 February
(United States) Teenage Mutant Ninja Turtles	Seven Network	12 February
(United Kingdom) We'll Think of Something	ABC TV	13 February
(United States) Kidd Video	Nine Network	17 February
(United States) The Adventures of Huckleberry Finn	ABC TV	17 February
(China) A Dream of Red Mansions	SBS	18 February
(United Kingdom) After the War	ABC TV	24 February
(United Kingdom) Floyd's American Pie	SBS	25 February
(United Kingdom) Michael Palin: Around the World in 80 Days	ABC TV	4 March
(United Kingdom) Agatha Christie's Poirot	Seven Network	6 March
(United Kingdom) The Gemini Factor	ABC TV	12 March
(United States) Beverly Hills Buntz	Nine Network	23 March
(United States) Police Academy	Nine Network	26 March
(United Kingdom) The Watch House	ABC TV	28 March
(United States) Hard Time on Planet Earth	Seven Network	28 March
(United Kingdom) Screen One	ABC TV	1 April
(United States) Hard Copy	Nine Network	2 April
(United Kingdom) Hale and Pace	Nine Network	5 April
(United Kingdom) Marco	SBS	7 April
(United States) Bugs vs. Daffy: Battle of the Music Video Stars	Nine Network	12 April
(United Kingdom) One God-Three	SBS	12 April
(United States) Maria Chapdelaine	ABC TV	17 April
(United States) Bugs Bunny's Wild World of Sports	Nine Network	19 April
(United Kingdom) Frontiers	ABC TV	22 April
(New Zealand) Heart of the High Country	10 TV Australia	22 April
(United States) Generations	Seven Network	24 April
(United States) Rituals	Seven Network	1 May
(United States) The Hitchhiker	10 TV Australia	1 May
(West Germany) The Black Forest Clinic	10 TV Australia	8 May
(United Kingdom) Ladies in Charge	ABC TV	12 May
(United Kingdom) The Heat of the Day	ABC TV	25 May
(United States) Cross of Fire	Seven Network	27 May
(United States) Baywatch	10 TV Australia	8 June
(Italy) The Six Cases of Father Brown	SBS	9 June
(Denmark) Once a Cop	SBS	9 June
(United States) Sparky's Magic Piano	ABC TV	11 June
(United Kingdom) / (Australia) The Great Wall of Iron	ABC TV	14 June
(United States) The Jim Henson Hour	10 TV Australia	16 June
(United Kingdom) Alexei Sayle's Stuff	ABC TV	18 June
(United Kingdom) Singles	Seven Network	22 June
(United Kingdom) A Kind of Loving	ABC TV	23 June
(Canada) / (France) Babar	ABC TV	2 July
(United States) Chip 'n Dale Rescue Rangers	Seven Network	8 July
(United Kingdom) Eye of the Dragon	ABC TV	9 July
(Greece) Madam Sousou	SBS	10 July
(United States) The Charmings	Nine Network	10 July
(United Kingdom) Woof!	Nine Network	14 July
(Japan) Grimm's Fairy Tale Classics	Nine Network	14 July
(United States) The Karate Kid	Nine Network	14 July
(United Kingdom) The Mind	SBS	16 July
(United Kingdom) The Lenny Henry Show	SBS	20 July
(United States) Father Dowling Mysteries	Seven Network	29 July
(United Kingdom) Ffizz	10 TV Australia	31 July
(United States) E! Entertainment	Nine Network	1 August
(United Kingdom) Never Come Back	ABC TV	1 August
(Japan) / (United States) / (Netherlands) Ox Tales	Nine Network	6 August
(United Kingdom) Moondial	ABC TV	10 August
(United States) Booker	Nine Network	11 August
(United Kingdom) The Fear	ABC TV	13 August
(United States) Marblehead Manor	10 TV Australia	14 August
(United States) Hardball	Nine Network	16 August
(United Kingdom) Mike and Angelo	ABC TV	20 August
(United Kingdom) Ernie's Incredible Illucinations	ABC TV	20 August
(France) Bouli	ABC TV	20 August
(United Kingdom) The Country Boy	ABC TV	24 August
(Spain) Miguel Servet	SBS	26 August
(France) The Secret Drawer	SBS	26 August
(United States) Major Dad	10 TV Australia	28 August
(United States) Poor Little Rich Girl: The Barbara Hutton Story	Seven Network	9 September
(United Kingdom) Press Gang	ABC TV	10 September
(Italy) Spy Wars	SBS	11 September
(New Zealand) Space Knights	Seven Network	15 September
(United States) Vid Kids	10 TV Australia	16 September
(United States) America's Funniest People	Nine Network	20 September
(United Kingdom) Prisoners of Childhood	SBS	21 September
(United States) The Completely Mental Misadventures of Ed Grimley	ABC TV	27 September
(Greece) The Storm	SBS	10 October
(United States) Knight & Daye	10 TV Australia	12 October
(United States) / (Japan) / (Canada) The Adventures of the Little Koala	Nine Network	20 October
(United States) Blind Faith	Seven Network	22 October
(United Kingdom) Adventurer	ABC TV	28 October
(Japan) Shingen	SBS	31 October
(United States) Island Son	Seven Network	5 November
(United Kingdom) Body Styles	SBS	7 November
(United States) Cartoon All-Stars to the Rescue	Seven Network; Nine Network; 10 TV Australia	9 November
(United States) Good Morning, Miss Bliss	Seven Network	13 November
(United States) The Thanksgiving Promise	Seven Network	18 November
(United States) Hey Vern, It's Ernest!	Nine Network	19 November
(United Kingdom) Round the Bend	ABC TV	19 November
(Japan) / (United States) / (Netherlands) Wowser	Nine Network	20 November
(United States) In the Heat of the Night	Seven Network	20 November
(United Kingdom) That's Love	10 TV Australia	20 November
(United Kingdom) No Strings	Seven Network	20 November
(United Kingdom) Only One Earth	ABC TV	20 November
(United States) Murphy's Law	10 TV Australia	21 November
(United States) The Famous Teddy Z	Nine Network	22 November
(United States) A Man Called Hawk	Nine Network	22 November
(United States) Starting from Scratch	10 TV Australia	22 November
(United Kingdom) Vintage: A History of Wine	ABC TV	23 November
(United States) A Fine Romance (1989)	10 TV Australia	24 November
(United States) A Peaceable Kingdom	Nine Network	24 November
(United States) The Young Riders	Seven Network	25 November
(United Kingdom) The Real Charlotte	ABC TV	26 November
(United Kingdom) The Return of Shelley	ABC TV	26 November
(United States) New Attitude	Nine Network	26 November
(United States) Free Spirit	Nine Network	28 November
(United States) Doctor Doctor	Nine Network	28 November
(United States) Family Matters	Seven Network	30 November
(United States) Annie McGuire	Nine Network	6 December
(United States) The New Archies	Nine Network	8 December
(United States) Great Circuses of the World	Nine Network	9 December
(United States) / (United Kingdom) Hollywood the Golden Years: The RKO Story	ABC TV	13 December
(Australia) / (United States) Dolphin Cove	Nine Network	14 December
(United States) 48 Hours	Nine Network	16 December
(United States) The Phantom of the Opera	Nine Network	16 December
(United Kingdom) Rod, Jane and Freddy	ABC TV	18 December
(United States) Cops	10 TV Australia	18 December
(United Kingdom) Blackadder's Christmas Carol	Seven Network	20 December
(United Kingdom) Rarg	10 TV Australia	22 December
(United Kingdom) First of the Summer Wine	ABC TV	23 December
(United Kingdom) Jim Henson's The Storyteller	10 TV Australia	24 December
(United Kingdom) The Angel and the Soldier Boy	ABC TV	25 December
(United States) Marvin: Baby of the Year	Seven Network	26 December
(United States) / (Japan) The Adventures of the Galaxy Rangers	Seven Network	1990

=== Changes to network affiliation ===
This is a list of programs which made their premiere on an Australian television network that had previously premiered on another Australian television network. The networks involved in the switch of allegiances are predominantly both free-to-air networks or both subscription television networks. Programs that have their free-to-air/subscription television premiere, after previously premiering on the opposite platform (free-to air to subscription/subscription to free-to air) are not included. In some cases, programs may still air on the original television network. This occurs predominantly with programs shared between subscription television networks.

==== Domestic ====
Program	New network(s)	Previous network(s)	Date
Kaboodle	Seven Network	ABC TV	8 April

==== International ====
Program	New network(s)	Previous network(s)	Date
(United Kingdom) Ken Hom's Chinese Cookery	ABC TV	SBS	5 January
(United States) The Real Ghostbusters	Nine Network	10 TV Australia	3 March
(United States) The Banana Splits	Southern Cross Television	ABC TV	1990

== Television shows ==
=== 1950s ===
- Mr. Squiggle and Friends (1959–1999)

=== 1960s ===
- Four Corners (1961–present)

=== 1970s ===
- Hey Hey It's Saturday (1971–1999)
- A Current Affair (1971–1978, 1988–2005, 2006–present)
- The Midday Show (1973–1998)
- 60 Minutes (1979–present)

=== 1980s ===
- Sale of the Century (1980–2001)
- Sunday (1981–2008)
- Wheel of Fortune (1981–1996, 1996–2003, 2004-beyond)
- Today (1982–present)
- Neighbours (1985–1990)
- The Flying Doctors (1986–1991)
- Rage (1987–present)
- The Comedy Company (1988–1990)
- Home and Away (1988–present)
- Family Feud (1988–1996)
- Fast Forward (1989–1994)
- Til Ten (1989–1991)
- G.P. (1989–1996)

=== 1990s ===
- Australia's Funniest Home Video Show (1990–2000, 2000–2004, 2005–2007)

== Ending this year ==
Date	Show	Channel	Debut
20 January	Seven's Super Saturday	Seven Network	1988
21 January	The Cartoon Connection	Seven Network	1985
1 February	The Power, The Passion	Seven Network	1989
13 May	Kaboodle	Seven Network; ABC TV	1987
10 June	The Greatest Tune on Earth	Seven Network	20 May 1990
26 June	Elly & Jools	Nine Network	11 June 1990
29 June	Stop at this Station	ABC TV	1988
11 November	The Comedy Company	10 TV Australia	1988
15 November	The Girl from Tomorrow	Nine Network	30 October 1990
17 November	Neighbours	10 TV Australia	1985

== See also ==
- 1990 in Australia
- List of Australian films of 1990
