= List of Australian films of 1988 =

== 1988 ==
Title	Director	Cast	Genre	Notes
Afraid to Dance	Denny Lawrence	Nique Needles, Rosey Jones, Grigor Taylor, Tina Bursill, Annie Byron, Mervyn Drake, Tom Richards, Steve J. Spears, Bill Young, Allan Penney	Drama Feature film	
Alterations	Julian Pringle	Richard Moir, Angela Punch McGregor, Linden Wilkinson, Steven Jacobs, Gillian Jones, Alan David Lee, Karen Linley, Michelle Linley, Tim Drummond, Paul Bertram, Kim Krejus	Drama ABC TV film	
An Ordinary Woman	Sue Brooks	Denise Scott, Bruce Atkins	Short film	IMDb
As Time Goes By	Barry Peak	Bruno Lawrence, Nique Needles, Ray Barrett, Marcelle Schmitz, Mitchell Faircloth, Max Gillies, Deborah Force, Christine Keogh, Don Bridges, Ian Shrives, Jane Clifton, Mitch Harrison, Fred Peter, John Barrett, Rex Greeney, Additional Voices: Matthew King	Comedy / Sci-fi Feature film	IMDb
Backstage	Jonathan Hardy	Laura Branigan, Michael Aitkens, Noel Ferrier	Drama	IMDb
Barracuda	Pino Amenta	Andrew McFarlane, Dennis Miller, Kim Krejus, Shane Briant, Graham Rouse, Cassandra Delaney, Roger Ward, John O'Brien, David Lynch, Angela Kennedy, John Bonney, Patrick Ward, Pat Bishop, Colleen Clifford, Robert Taylor, Joe Bugner	Drama / Thriller TV film	
Belinda	Pamela Gibbons	Deanna Jeffs, Mary Regan, Kaarin Fairfax	Drama	IMDb aka: "Midnight Dancer" in the US
Bingo, Bridesmaids & Braces	Gillian Armstrong	Gillian Armstrong, Kerry Carlson, Diana Doman	Documentary	IMDb
Black Tulip	Franco Cristofani	Brian Anderson, Phillip Hinton, Paul Johnstone, Juliet Jordan, Keith Scott, Shane Withington	Animation / Adventure	IMDb
The Boardroom	Brian Phillis	Vincent Ball, Tony Wager, Colin McEwan, Leslie Wright, Ian Toyne, Shaunna O'Grady, Leith Taylor, Rick Hearder, Kathryn Rowe, Matthew Quartermaine	Comedy TV film	
Body Works	David Caesar	Margot Nash	Documentary	IMDb aka: "Bodywork" and "Body Work"
Boulevard of Broken Dreams	Pino Amenta	John Waters, Penelope Stewart, Nicki Paull, Kim Gyngell, Kevin Miles, Ross Thompson, Andrew McFarlane	Drama Feature film	IMDb
Boundaries of the Heart	Lex Marinos	Wendy Hughes, John Hargreaves, Norman Kaye, Julie Nihill, Max Cullen, Michael Siberry, John Clayton, Robert Faggetter	Drama Feature film	IMDb
Breaking Loose	Rod Hay	Peter Phelps, Vince Martin, Abigail, Shane Connor, David Ngoombujarra, John Clayton, Sandra Lee Paterson, Angela Kennedy, Tom Richards, Gary Waddell	Action / Drama Feature film	IMDb aka: "Summer City II"
Cane Toads: An Unnatural History	Mark Lewis	Tip Byrne, H. W. Kerr, Glen Ingram	Documentary	IMDb
Cannibal Tours	Dennis O'Rourke		Documentary	IMDb
Celia	Ann Turner	Rebecca Smart, Nicholas Eadie, Victoria Longley, Mary-Anne Fahey, William Zappa, Deborra-Lee Furness, Amelia Frid	Drama / Fantasy / Thriller Feature film	IMDb
Cherith	Shirley Barrett	Louise Cullen, Zoe Williams, Maggie Dence	Short film	IMDb
The Clean Machine	Ken Cameron	Steve Bisley, Peter Kowitz, Grigor Taylor, Sandy Gore, Tim Robertson, Regina Gaigalas, Ed Devereaux, Mervyn Drake, Frank Whitten, Robert Taylor, Marshall Napier	Drama / Thriller TV film	
Compo	Nigel Buesst	Jeremy Stanford, Bruce Kerr, Christopher Barry, Cliff Neate, Rowan Woods, Peter Hosking, Leo Regan, Darryl Emmerson, Elizabeth Crockett	Comedy Feature film	IMDb
Crocodile Dundee II	John Cornell	Paul Hogan, Linda Kozlowski, John Meillon, Ernie Dingo, John Meillon, Hector Ubarry, Juan Fernandez, Charles S. Dutton, Steve Rackman, Gus Mercurio	Action / Adventure / Comedy Feature film	IMDb
Custody	Ian Munro	Judith Stratford, Peter Browne, Michael Cudlin, Sheridan Murphy, Peter Carroll, Susan Leith, Mary Acres, Stuart Fowler, June Musgrave, Lillian Thompson-Austen, Eric Baker	Drama TV film	
Dadah Is Death	Jerry London	Julie Christie, Hugo Weaving, John Polson, Victor Banerjee, Sarah Jessica Parker	Drama	IMDb aka: "A Long Way From Home"
Daisy and Simon	Stasch Radwanski Jr.	Jan Adele, Sean Scully, Colin McEwan, Shauna O'Grady, Tony Wager, Leith Taylor	Drama Feature film	IMDb
Day of the Panther	Brian Trenchard-Smith	Edward John Stazak, John Stanton, James Richards, Rowena Wallace	Action	IMDb
The Dreaming	Mario Andreacchio	Arthur Dignam, Penny Cook, Gary Sweet, Kristina Nehm, Patrick Frost, John Noble, Leo Taylor, Peter Merril, Deborah Little, Marcella Russo, Kathy Fisher, Laurence Clifford	Horror / Mystery / Thriller Feature film	IMDb
E'ellermani: The Story of Leo and Leva	Lorraine Mafi-Williams		Documentary	IMDb
Emerald City	Michael Jenkins	John Hargreaves, Robyn Nevin, Chris Haywood, Nicole Kidman, Ruth Cracknell, Nicholas Hammond, Michelle Torres, Dennis Miller	Comedy / Drama Feature film	IMDb
The Everlasting Secret Family	Michael Thornhill	Arthur Dignam, Mark Lee, Heather Mitchell, Dennis Miller, Paul Goddard, John Meillon, Allan Penney, Beth Child, Anna Volska, John Clayton	Drama / Romance Feature film	IMDb
Evil Angels	Fred Schepisi	Meryl Streep, Sam Neill, Bruce Myles, Charles Tingwell, Dorothy Alison, Brian James, Dennis Miller, Lewis Fitz-Gerald, Maurie Fields, Sandy Gore, Alan Hopgood, Debra Lawrance, Deborra-Lee Furness, Kevin Miles	Biography / Drama Feature film	IMDb, Streep won Best Actress at the 1989 Cannes Film Festival aka: "A Cry in the Dark"
Fragments of War: The Story of Damien Parer	John Duigan	Nicholas Eadie, Anne Tenney, Huw Williams, Steve Jodrell, Jeff Truman, Liz Stuart, Melanie Salomon, Maureen O'Shaughnessy, Mary Regan, Anna Hruby, Robert Taylor, Leone Carmen	Biography / Drama / Romance TV film	
Georgia	Ben Lewin	Judy Davis, John Bach, Julia Blake, Marshall Napier, Alex Menglet, Lewis Fiander, Roy Baldwin, Colin Hay	Mystery / Thriller Feature film	IMDb
Ghosts… of the Civil Dead	John Hillcoat	David Field, Chris DeRose, Nick Cave, Mike Bishop, Chris de Rose, Vincent Gil, Bogdan Koca, Kevin Mackey, Ian Mortimer, John Flaus	Drama / Horror Feature film	IMDb
Grievous Bodily Harm	Mark Joffe	Colin Friels, John Waters, Bruno Lawrence, Joy Bell, Chris Stalker, Kim Gyngell, Shane Briant, Caz Lederman, Sandy Gore, John Flaus, Gary Waddell, Kerry Armstrong	Crime / Thriller Feature film	IMDb
Hell's Half Hectare	Scott Patterson	Johnny Barker, Alan Flower, Richard Kuipers	Short film	IMDb
In the Aftermath	Carl Colpaert	Tony Markes, Rainbow Dolan, Kenneth McCabe	Animation / Drama	IMDb
Incident at Raven's Gate	Rolf de Heer	Steven Vidler, Celine Griffin, Max Cullen, Terry Camilleri, Ritchie Singer, Vincent Gil, Saturday Rosenberg	Sci-Fi / Thriller Feature film	IMDb aka" "Encounter at Raven's Gate"
Kadaicha	James Bogle	Zoe Carides, Tom Jennings, Eric Oldfield, Natalie McCurry, Fiona Gauntlett, Deborah Kennedy, Kerry McKay, Bruce Hughes, Sara Dakin, Nicholas Ryan, Sean Scully	Horror / Thriller Feature film	IMDb aka: "Stones of Death" aka Stones Of Death
Lover Boy	Geoffrey Wright	Noah Taylor, Gillian Jones, Ben Mendelsohn	Drama / Romance Short Feature film	IMDb
The Man from Snowy River II	Geoff Burrowes	Tom Burlinson, Sigrid Thornton, Brian Dennehy, Nicholas Eadie, Bryan Marshall, Mark Hembrow, Peter Cummins, Rhys McConnochie, Wynn Roberts, Peter Browne, Cornelia Frances, Alan Hopgood, Tony Barry	Adventure / Drama / Western Feature film	IMDb aka: Return to Snowy River (US) and The Untamed (UK)
Minnamurra	Ian Barry	Jeff Fahey, Tushka Bergen, Steven Vidler, Richard Moir, Shane Briant, Drew Forsythe, Fred Parslow, Cornelia Frances, Michael Winchester, Owen Weingott, Sandy Gore	Drama Feature film	aka Outback (US) / The Fighting Creed
Moodeitj Yorgas	Tracey Moffatt		Documentary / Short	IMDb
The Navigator: A Medieval Odyssey	Vincent Ward	Bruce Lyons, Chris Haywood, Hamish McFarlane, Marshall Napier, Paul Livingston	Fantasy	IMDb
Night's High Noon: An Anti-Terrain	Peter Callas		Short	IMDb
Pandemonium	Haydn Keenan	David Argue, Amanda Dole, Esben Storm	Comedy / Horror	IMDb
Pleasure Domes	Maggie Fooke		Short	IMDb
Point of Departure	Kathryn Millard	Patrick Frost, Sue Ingleton, Tim Maddocks	Documentary / Short	IMDb
Prisoner of Zenda		Christine Amor, Robert Coleby, Claire Crowther	Animation	IMDb Based on book of same title
The Pursuit of Happiness	Martha Ansara	Laura Black, Peter Hardy, Anna Gare	Drama Feature film	IMDb
Raw Silk	Greg Dee	David Argue, Nicki Paull, Frank Gallacher, Frankie J. Holden, Colin Hay, Robert Morgan, Ariane Hubay, John Heywood, Suzy Cato	Comedy / Drama TV film / TV Pilot	
The Riddle of the Stinson	Chris Noonan	Jack Thompson, Helen O'Connor, Norman Kaye, Richard Roxburgh, Mark Lee, Susan Lyons, Huw Williams, Esben Storm Len Kaserman, Frank Wilson, Dennis Miller	Biography / Drama TV film	
Rikky and Pete	Nadia Tass	Stephen Kearney, Nina Landis, Tetchie Agbayani, Bill Hunter, Dorothy Alison, Bruno Lawrence, Bruce Spence, Glenn Robbins, Alan Hopgood, Lewis Fitz-Gerald	Adventure / Comedy / Drama Feature film	IMDb
Salt, Saliva, Sperm and Sweat	Philip Brophy	Phil Dean, Jean Kittson, Lyndal Barry	Short	IMDb
Sebastian and the Sparrow	Scott Hicks	Alexander Bainbridge, Jeremy Angerson, Robert Coleby, Elizabeth Alexander, Vincent Gil, Alice Ramsay, John Clayton	Adventure / Family Feature film	IMDb
Shame	Steve Jodrell	Deborra-Lee Furness, Tony Barry, Simone Buchanan, Gillian Jones, Peter Aanensen, Margaret Ford, David Franklin, Bill McClusky, Alison Taylor, Phil Dean, Stig Wemyss	Drama / Thriller Feature film	IMDb
Shut-In	Cam Eason	Robert Chuter, Deborah Force, Effie James	Short film	IMDb
Smoke 'Em If You Got 'Em	Ray Boseley	Rob Howard, Nique Needles, Polly Croke	Comedy Feature film	IMDb
Spook	David Anthony Hall	Tim Elston, Joanne Samuel, Daniel Hill, Amanda Hill, Roger Carroll, Patricia Perry, Peter Kowitz, Ray Wiseman, Donald Walters, Tom Richards	Drama / Thriller Feature film	IMDb
Takeover	Robert Marchant	Barry Otto, Anne Tenney, Paul Chubb, Wayne Cull, Alexander Kemp, Julie du Rieu, Sean Scully, Justin Gaffney, Bruce Kerr	Comedy TV film	
To Make a Killing	Karl Zwicky	Tamblyn Lord, Craig Pearce, Tiffany Dowe, Ralph Cotterill, Kelly Dingwall, Joanna Lockwood, John Godden, Gerard Maguire, John Clayton	Drama	IMDb aka: "Vicious!" and "Wild Boys"
Tudawali	Steve Jodrell	Ernie Dingo, Frank Wilson, Jedda Cole, Peter Fisher, Charles Tingwell, Syd Plummer, Bill McCluskey	Biography / Drama TV film	
Strike of the Panther	Brian Trenchard-Smith	Edward John Stazak, John Stanton, Rowena Wallace, Jim Richards, Zale Daniel, Paris Jefferson	Action / Drama TV film	IMDb
The Tale of Ruby Rose	Roger Scholes	Melita Jurisic, Chris Haywood, Rod Zuanic, Martyn Sanderson, Sheila Florance, Sheila Kennelly, John McKelvey, Wilkie Collins, Nell Dobson, Terry Garcia	Drama / Horror / Thriller Feature film	IMDb
The 13th Floor	Chris Roache	Lisa Hensley, Miranda Otto, Tim McKenzie, Jeff Truman, Vic Rooney, Tony Blackett, Georgie Parker, Paul Hunt, Kylie Clare, Allen Leong, Michael Caton	Horror / Thriller Feature film	IMDb
Two Brothers Running	Ted Robinson	Tom Conti, Elizabeth Alexander, Ritchie Singer, Asher Keddie, Deborra-Lee Furness, John Gregg, Martin Lewis, Rachel Levita, Mark Zandle, Dorothy Alison	Comedy Feature film	IMDb
Warm Nights on a Slow Moving Train	Bob Ellis	Wendy Hughes, Colin Friels, Norman Kaye, John Clayton, Rod Zuanic, Lewis Fitz-Gerald, Peter Whitford, Chris Haywood, Steven J. Spears, Grant Tilly, Peter Carmody, John Flaus	Drama / Romance Feature film	IMDb
Whiteforce	Eddie Romero	Sam J. Jones, Kimberley Pistone, Tim Hughes, Raoul Aragonn, Jimmy Fabregas, Vic Diaz, Rubin Rustia, Ken Metcalfe, Mike Monty, Tsing Tong Tsai	Action / Drama Feature film	IMDb
Young Einstein	Yahoo Serious	Yahoo Serious, Odile Le Clezio, John Howard, Lulu Pinkus, Pee Wee Wilson, Su Cruickshank, Esben Storm, Roger Ward, David Ngoombujarra, Georgie Parker	Comedy Feature film	IMDb

== See also ==
- 1988 in Australia
- 1988 in Australian television
