= 1988 in Australia =

- Monarch: Elizabeth II
- Governor-General: Sir Ninian Stephen
- Prime minister: Bob Hawke
- Population: 16,532,164
- Elections: NSW, Referendum, VIC

The following lists events that happened during the year 1988 in Australia.

- Decades: 1960s; 1970s; 1980s; 1990s; 2000s
- See also: 1988 in Australian television; 1988 in Australian literature; Other events of 1988; Timeline of Australian history

== Incumbents ==
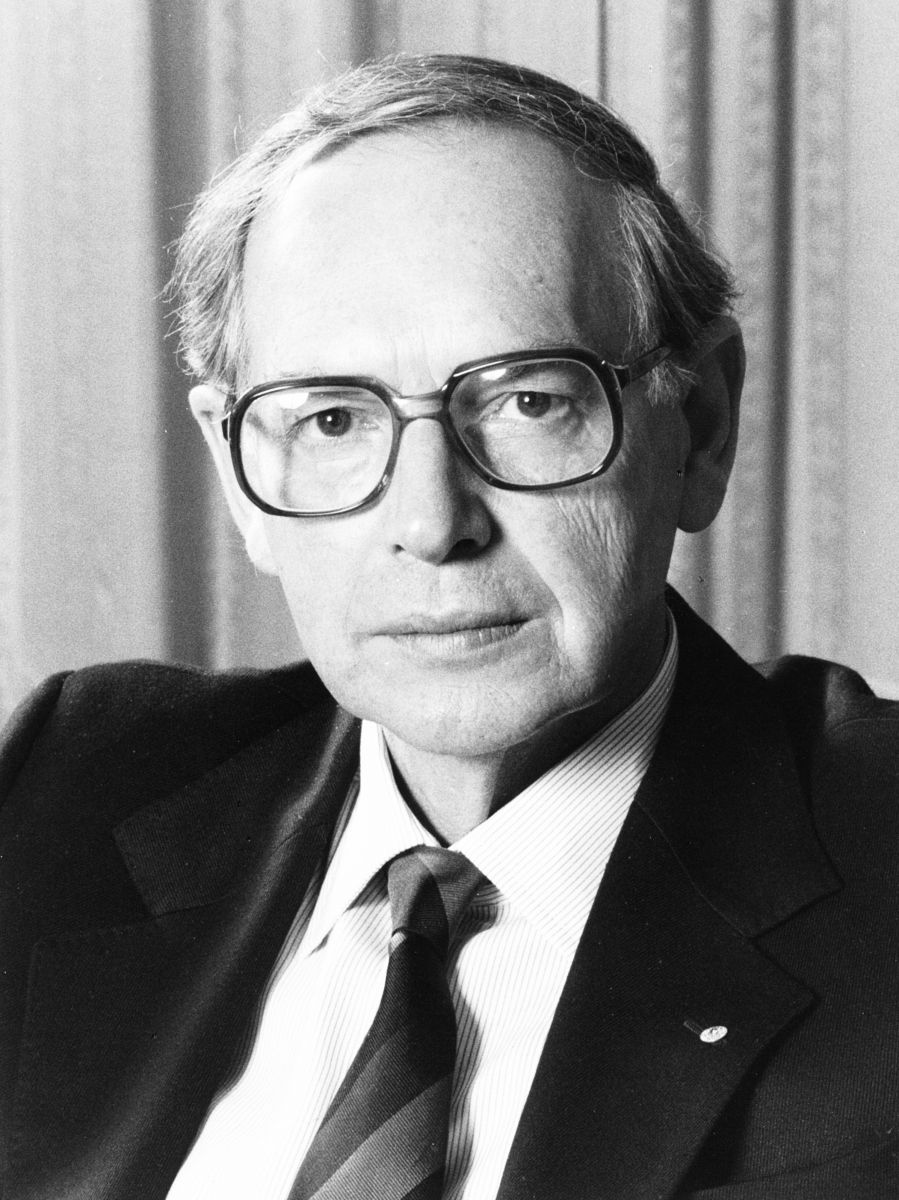
Sir Ninian Stephen

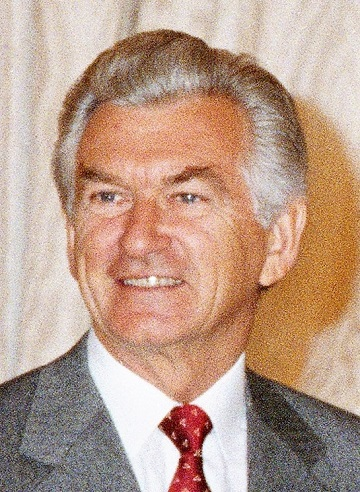
Bob Hawke

- Monarch – Elizabeth II
- Governor-General – Sir Ninian Stephen
- Prime Minister – Bob Hawke
  - Deputy Prime Minister – Lionel Bowen
  - Opposition Leader – John Howard
- Chief Justice – Sir Anthony Mason

=== State and territory leaders ===
- Premier of New South Wales – Barrie Unsworth (until 25 March), then Nick Greiner
  - Opposition Leader – Nick Greiner (until 25 March), then Bob Carr
- Premier of Queensland – Mike Ahern
  - Opposition Leader – Nev Warburton (until 2 March), then Wayne Goss
- Premier of South Australia – John Bannon
  - Opposition Leader – John Olsen
- Premier of Tasmania – Robin Gray
  - Opposition Leader – Neil Batt (until 14 December), then Michael Field
- Premier of Victoria – John Cain Jr.
  - Opposition Leader – Jeff Kennett
- Premier of Western Australia – Brian Burke (until 25 February), then Peter Dowding
  - Opposition Leader – Barry MacKinnon
- Chief Minister of the Northern Territory – Stephen Hatton (until 13 July), then Marshall Perron
  - Opposition Leader – Terry Smith
- President of the Legislative Assembly of Norfolk Island – John Brown

=== Governors and administrators ===
- Governor of New South Wales – Sir James Rowland
- Governor of Queensland – Sir Walter Campbell
- Governor of South Australia – Sir Donald Dunstan
- Governor of Tasmania – Sir Phillip Bennett
- Governor of Victoria – Davis McCaughey
- Governor of Western Australia – Gordon Reid
- Administrator of Norfolk Island – John Matthew (until 31 December), then William Campbell
- Administrator of the Northern Territory – Eric Johnston

== Events ==
- Australia's Bicentenary year, celebrations lasting throughout year.

=== January ===
- 17 January – The TV soap Home and Away is launched by Seven Network.
- 19 January – Federal Sport and Tourism Minister John Brown steps down for apparently misleading Parliament over his role in the tendering process for Brisbane's Expo contracts on 10 December 1987.
- 26 January – Australia Day, Australia celebrates its bicentennial day with the arrival of the First Fleet Re-enactment Voyage and a tall ships parade in Sydney Harbour.

=== February ===
- 5 February – New Liberal Party President, entrepreneur John Elliott, states publicly that the Liberals lack strong leadership and had not deserved to win at the previous election.
- 6 February – The 1988 Adelaide by-election is held for the Australian House of Representatives seat of Adelaide following Chris Hurford's retirement. Liberal candidate Michael Pratt wins the seat with a 9% swing, largely because Labor refused to rule out a proposal for timed local telephone calls.
- 9 February – Australian Labor Party President Mick Young is forced to resign from Parliament over allegations (later disproved) of concealing a large donation from Harris-Daishowa. In the ensuing reshuffle, Graham Richardson and Michael Duffy enter Cabinet.

=== March ===
- 19 March – Nick Greiner and the Liberal Party win the 1988 New South Wales state election in a landside, removing the ALP government of Barrie Unsworth. Greiner's Coalition of 39 Liberals and 20 Nationals wins 49.5% of the vote in the enlarged 109-seat House, leading comfortably over Labor with 43 seats and 7 others. Labor suffers a further fall of 10% in its vote. National Party leader Wal Murray becomes Deputy Premier of New South Wales.
- 26 March – The 1988 Port Adelaide by-election is held for the Australian House of Representatives seat of Port Adelaide following Mick Young's resignation. The election is won by Labor candidate Rod Sawford, despite an 11.1% swing to the Liberal Party.

=== April ===
- 9 April – At the Liberals' Federal Council meeting in Melbourne, Liberal leaders Jeff Kennett, John Olsen and Barry MacKinnon are reserved about a consumption tax. John Elliott's motion to broaden the tax is passed.
- 30 April – World Expo 88 opens in Brisbane, Queensland. The exhibition runs for 6 months hosting pavilions from over 70 countries and thrusts Brisbane into the international spotlight.

=== May ===
- 9 May – Elizabeth II opens the New Parliament House in Canberra

=== June ===
- 1 June – the British Government fail to stop the publication of Spycatcher by the ex-MI5 agent Peter Wright.
- 6 June – 10 June – The Australian Labor Party's biennial conference in Hobart sees the left faction defeated on the divisive issues of uranium mining, privatisation and tertiary education fees.
- 20 June - The $2 coin replaces the note of the same denomination issued since 1966.

=== August ===
- 3 August – Federal Opposition Leader John Howard's draft One Australia policy taps latent concerns over Asian immigration and sparks damaging debate on this issue within the Coalition.
- 17 August – Foreign Minister Bill Hayden is announced as the next Governor-General. In the subsequent ministerial reshuffle, Gareth Evans receives the Foreign Affairs and Trade portfolio, Ralph Willis receives Industrial Relations, and Robert Ray receives Immigration, Local Government and Ethnic Affairs.
- 22 August – Federal Parliament reassembles for the Budget session in the new Parliament House, Canberra.
- 24 August – In the vote on a Labor motion repudiating race as a criterion for immigration, Liberals Ian Macphee, Philip Ruddock and Peter Baume cross the floor, while Wilson and Michael MacKellar abstain.

=== September ===
- 1 September – Acacia pycnantha proclaimed Australia's national floral emblem.
- 3 September – The 1988 Australian referendum is held and propositions on 4-year parliamentary terms, recognition of local government, religious liberty and other issues are defeated with 60% of the electorate voting against them.
- 26 September – Federal Opposition Leader John Howard sacks the National Party of Australia's John Stone from the Shadow Cabinet over a series of remarks about immigration and for not being a "team player".

=== October ===
- 1 October – The 1988 Victorian state election is held and the ALP government of John Cain is narrowly re-elected for a third term in Victoria.
- 8 October – The 1988 Oxley by-election is held for the Australian House of Representatives seat of Oxley vacated by Bill Hayden. Labor candidate Les Scott only narrowly wins the seat, suffering a 12% swing. Bill Hayden's world trip before taking up his appointment as the new Governor-General is criticised by the Federal Opposition and others.
- 12 October – Two officers of the Victoria Police are gunned down execution-style in the Walsh Street police shootings.
- 15 October – Aus Steam '88 commences in Melbourne, Victoria
- 30 October – World Expo 88 draws to a close after a 6-month spectacular.

=== November ===
- 29 November – The four acts granting the ACT self-government are given Royal Assent.
- Olympic Dam, the world's largest uranium deposit and the largest underground mine in Australian opens

=== December ===
- 4 December – In Sydney, Federal Opposition Leader John Howard launches a statement of principle and general policy entitled Future Directions which reveals that a Liberal government would encourage the introduction of external school examinations, establish a National Standards Monitoring Program for schools and did not rule out the introduction of a consumption tax after the first term of a Coalition government. Based on intensive research in 20 marginal seats, the statement also speaks nostalgically of traditional values.
- 24 December – Arbitration Commission President Barry Maddern finds that the Remuneration Tribunal's November recommendations for a 29% increase in MP's salaries and allowances are justified.

== Arts and literature ==
- No Miles Franklin Award winner is announced as date changed from year of publication to year of announcement
- The Aboriginal Memorial was created to honour all Aboriginals that had died defending their land since 1788

== Film ==
- Celia
- Crocodile Dundee II
- Evil Angels
- The Man from Snowy River II
- Young Einstein

== Television ==
- 1 January – Australia Live, a four-hour celebration for Australia's bicentennial of European settlement airs on the ABC, SBS, the Nine Network and regional solus stations.
- 2 January – Imparja starts broadcasting to remote Central Australia via satellite It will have its official launch on 15 January.
- 17 January – The first episode of Home and Away goes to air.
- 17 January – A Current Affair debuts on Channel Nine, hosted by Jana Wendt.
- 24 January – Network Ten unveils its new logo, the "X" logo.
- 16 February – The Comedy Company debuts on Network 10 (1988–1990)
- 29 April – QSTV (now Seven Central) starts broadcasting to remote Eastern Australia via satellite.
- 20 May – Perth's third commercial television station NEW-10 opens, giving Perth the same number of stations as the eastern states.
- 10 September – Brisbane's TVQ-0 becomes TVQ-10. On the same day, Toowoomba's DDQ-10 becomes DDQ-0.
- Christopher Skase buys Perth's TVW-7 and SAS-7 from Alan Bond's Bell Group for $130 million, meaning that all stations in the Seven Network are owned by the one company for the first time.

== Sport ==
- 50m penalty introduced in the VFL.
- 4 March – First game of rugby league played at the newly built Sydney Football Stadium. St. George defeat Eastern Suburbs 24-14.
- 5 March – Newcastle Knights play their first game in the NSWRL. At Newcastle International Sports Centre (later EnergyAustralia Stadium), Parramatta win 28–4. On the same day, the Gold Coast Giants (later Seagulls & finally Chargers) play their first game in the same competition. At Seagulls Stadium, Canterbury win 21–10.
- 6 March – Brisbane Broncos play their first match, defeating defending premiers Manly 44–10 at Lang Park.
- 11 June – In the 100th rugby league test between the two nations, Australia defeat Great Britain 17-6.
- 28 June - Australia retain the Ashes by defeating Great Britain in the 2nd Test of the 1988 Great Britain Lions tour.
- 17 July – Australia thrash reigning World Champions Argentina 4–1 in the Bicentennial Gold Cup, at Sydney Football Stadium.
- 24 July – Patrick Carroll wins the men's national marathon title, clocking 2:10:44 in Brisbane, while Karen McCann claims the women's title in 2:44:05.
- 11 September – Canterbury-Bankstown Bulldogs defeat Balmain 24–12 to win the 81st NSWRL premiership. It is the first Grand Final played at the S.F.S. & the last game for Steve Mortimer. The Grand Final was played early so that Channel Ten could broadcast the 1988 Seoul Olympics. Bulldogs prop Paul Dunn is awarded the Clive Churchill medal for man of the match. Western Suburbs Magpies finish in last position, claiming their second straight wooden spoon.
- 24 September – Hawthorn Hawks (22.20.152) defeat Melbourne Demons (6.20.56) to win the 92nd VFL premiership.
- 9 October – Australia defeat New Zealand 25–12 in the final of the Rugby League World Cup, played at Eden Park in Auckland.
- Debbie Flintoff-King wins gold in the women's 400m over Tatyana Ledovskaya (Soviet Union) in a photo finish by 0.01s.
- Duncan Armstrong wins gold in the men's 200m freestyle over Anders Holmertz of Sweden & race favourite Matt Biondi of the United States.
- Brownlow Medal awarded to Gerard Healy (Sydney.)

== Births ==
- 7 January – Scott Pendlebury, footballer
- 17 January – Will Genia, rugby union player
- 20 January – Nathan Jones, footballer
- 22 January – Steve Constanzo, basketball player
- 27 January – Alice Burdeu, fashion model
- 15 February
  - Jessica De Gouw, actress
  - Jarryd Hayne, rugby league player and football player
  - Tim Mannah, rugby league player
- 22 February – Dane Searls, BMX rider (d. 2011)
- 2 March – Matthew Mitcham, diver
- 8 March – Johnny Ruffo, singer-songwriter and dancer (d. 2023)
- 31 March – Conrad Sewell, singer-songwriter
- 3 April – Daniel Johnson, basketball player
- 12 April – April Rose Pengilly, model and actress
- 20 April – Michael Jennings, Australian-Tongan rugby league player
- 26 April – Daniel Jackson, basketball player
- 2 May
  - Laura Brent, actress
  - Anna McGahan, actress
- 13 May – Casey Donovan, singer, Indigenous television host
- 26 May
  - Will Chambers, rugby league player
  - Dani Samuels, discus thrower
  - Joel Selwood, Australian rules footballer
- 11 June – Claire Holt, actress
- 16 June – Nathan Parsons, actor
- 17 June
  - Stephanie Rice, swimmer.
  - Andrew Ogilvy, basketball player
- 3 July – Tyson Demos, basketball player
- 6 July – Cody Fern, actor and filmmaker
- 8 July
  - Rachael Finch, beauty pageant titleholder and television reporter
  - Dave Taylor, rugby league player
- 4 August – Liam Zamel-Paez, high jumper
- 12 August – Oliver Atkins, rugby union footballer
- 22 August – Mitchell Langerak, soccer goalkeeper
- 24 August – Joel Thompson, rugby league player
- 1 September – Taryn Marler, actress
- 14 September – Nick Percat, racing driver
- 1 October – Cariba Heine, actress
- 15 October – Trent Dalzell, actor
- 17 October –
  - Harriet Dyer, actress
  - Dami Im, singer
- 18 October – Chris Cedar, basketball player
- 24 October – Chris Goulding, basketball player
- 3 November – Angus McLaren, actor
- 9 November
  - Cadeyrn Neville, rugby player
- 20 November – Rhys Wakefield, actor
- 30 November – Phillip Hughes, cricketer (d. 2014)
- 7 December – Emily Browning, actress
- 19 December – Casey Burgess, TV personality known for Hi-5

== Deaths ==
- 21 January – Vincent Lingiari, Aboriginal rights activist (b. 1908)
- 31 January – David Ahern, composer.
- 28 February – Kylie Tennant, author.
- 23 March – Reg Lye, actor (b. 1912)
- 31 March – William McMahon, twentieth Prime Minister of Australia.
- 31 May – Arthur Olliver, footballer (b. 1916)
- 2 July – Bede Morris, immunologist (b. 1927)
- 2 December – Lloyd Rees, artist.

== See also ==
- 1988 in Australian television
- List of Australian films of 1988
