= List of Australian films of 1990 =

The following is a list of Australian films released in the year 1990.

== 1990 ==
Title	Director	Cast	Genre	Type
An Angel at My Table	Jane Campion	Kerry Fox, Alexia Keogh, Karen Fergusson, Iris Churn, Jessie Mune, Kevin J. Wilson, Francesca Collins, Melina Bernecker, Mark Morrison, Katherine Murray-Cowper, Mark Thomson, Brenda Kendall, Paul Moffat	Biography / Drama	Feature film NZ/AUSTRALIA
Aya	Solrun Hoaas	Eri Ishida, Nicholas Eadie, Chris Haywood, Tim Robertson, Sumiko McDonald, Miki Oikawa, Atsushi Suzaki, Takahito Masuda, Christopher Parker, D.J. Foster, Mayumi Hoskin, Marion Heathfield, Jed Chegwiddon, Taya Stratton, Hao Fakushima, Julie Forsyth, Sandra Williams, Evelyn Johnson, Cathy Mundy, Warwick Randall, Sally-Anne Upton	Drama	Feature film
Beyond My Reach	Dan Burstall	Terri Garber, David Roberts, Alan Fletcher, Nicholas Hammond, Belinda Davey, Christine Harris, George Prataris, John Jacobs, Nicki Wendt, Christine Lucas, Karrie Forbes, Lynne Murphy, Nancy Black, Jon Craig, Chuck McKinney, Constance Lansberg, Stuart Conran, Tim Robertson, Arron Wayne Cull, Randall Berger	Drama	Feature film
The Big Steal	Nadia Tass	Ben Mendelsohn, Claudia Karvan, Marshall Napier, Damon Herriman, Angelo D'Angelo, Tim Robertson, Maggie King, Steve Bisley, Sheryl Munks, Lise Rodgers, Frankie J. Holden, Mark Hennessy, Roy Edmunds, Mike Nickol, Andrew Spence, Ken Radley, Robert Meldrum, Robert Morgan, Eve von Bibra, Mark Warren	Comedy	Won 'Best Actor in a Supporting Role', 'Best Screenplay, Original or Adapted' and 'Best Original Music Score' at AFI awards. Feature film
Bloodmoon	Alec Mills	Leon Lissek, Christine Amor, Ian Williams, Helen Thomson, Craig Cronin, Hazel Howson, Suzie Mackenzie, Anya Molina, Brian Moll, Stephen Bergin, Christine Broadway, Jonathan Hardy, Sueyan Cox, David Clendenning	Horror / Thriller	Feature film
Blood Oath	Stephen Wallace	Bryan Brown, George Takei, Terry O'Quinn, John Bach, Toshi Shioya, John Clarke, Deborah Unger, John Polson, Russell Crowe, Nicholas Eadie, Jason Donovan, Tetsu Watanabe, Sokyu Fujita, Ray Barrett, David Argue, Kazuhiro Muroyama, Malcolm Cork, Donal Gibson	Drama / War	Feature film aka: "Prisoners of the Sun"
Breakaway	Don McLennan	Bruce Boxleitner, Bruce Myles, Deborah Unger, Toni Scanlan, Terry Gill, Belinda Davey, Lauren Taylor, David Hoflin, Michelle O'Grady, Peter Lane, Peter Styles, Abbe Holmes, Gary Adams, Mike Bishop, Greg Carroll, Shane Spence, Geoff Brooks, Matt Parkinson, Bruce Alexander	Adventure / Comedy	Feature film aka: "Escape from Madness"
The Castanet Club	Neil Armfield	Angela Moore, Warren Coleman, Penny Biggins	Comedy / Musical	
Catch of the Day	Sarah Watt	Julie Forsyth, William McInnes, Kristina Schofield	Short / Animation	
The Crossing	George Ogilvie	Russell Crowe, Robert Mammone, Danielle Spencer	Drama	Feature film
A Date with Destiny	Mark Hartley		Short	
Dead Sleep	Alec Mills	Linda Blair, Tony Bonner, Andrew Booth	Mystery / Thriller	Feature film
Death In Brunswick	John Ruane	Sam Neill, Zoe Carides, John Clarke, Nicholas Papademetriou	Comedy	Feature film
Deep Dive	Sarah Watt		Short / Animation	
Fatal Sky	Frank Shields	Michael Nouri, Darlanne Fluegel, Maxwell Caulfield	Action / Sci-Fi	
Father	John Power	Max von Sydow, Julia Blake, Carol Drinkwater, Steve Jacobs	Drama / War	Entered into the 17th Moscow International Film Festival
Flowers by Request	Susan Wallace	Judy Davis, Robyn MacKenzie	Short	
Friday on My Mind	Frank Howson	Abigail, Tommy Dysart, Michael Lake	Thriller	Feature film
Golden Braid	Paul Cox	Chris Haywood, Gosia Dobrowolska, Paul Chubb, Norman Kaye	Drama	Feature film
Green Card	Peter Weir	Gérard Depardieu, Andie MacDowell	Romantic comedy	Golden Globes 3 nominations, 1 win 1 Oscar nomination for writing
Harbour Beat	David Elfick	John Hannah, Gary Day, Tony Poli, Angie Milliken, Peta Toppano	Drama	TV film
Heaven Tonight	Pino Amenta	John Waters, Rebecca Gilling, Kim Gyngell, Guy Pearce	Drama / Music	Feature film
In Too Deep	Colin South, John Tatoulis	Hugo Race, Santha Press, Rebekah Elmaloglou, John Flaus	Music / Thriller	Feature film
Jigsaw	Marc Gracie	Rebecca Gibney, Michael Coard, Dominic Sweeney	Thriller	Feature film
A Kink in the Picasso	Marc Gracie	Peter O'Brien, Jane Clifton, Jon Finlayson, Andrew Daddo	Comedy	Feature film
The Man in the Blue and White Holden	Peter Luby	Ben Ashton, Don Bridges, John Brumpton	Short	
Man Without Pigs	Chris Owen		Documentary	
The NeverEnding Story II: The Next Chapter	George T. Miller	Jonathan Brandis, Kenny Morrison, Clarissa Burt, John Wesley Shipp, Martin Umbach	Fantasy	Feature film US/AUSTRALIA
Nirvana Street Murder	Aleksi Vellis	Mark Little, Ben Mendelsohn, Mary Coustas	Comedy	Feature film
The Phantom Horseman	Howard Rubie	Beth Buchanan, Brian Rooney, Bryan Marshall	Drama	aka: "South Pacific Adventures"
Phobia	John Dingwall	Gosia Dobrowolska, Sean Scully	Drama	Feature film
Plead Guilty, Get a Bond	Peter Maguire	Lillian Crombie, Chris Haywood, Dennis Miller	Short	
Quigley Down Under	Simon Wincer	Tom Selleck, Alan Rickman, Laura San Giacomo, Gus Mercurio	Action / Adventure	Feature film US/AUSTRALIA
Raw Nerve	Tony Wellington	Kelly Dingwall, Rebecca Rigg, John Polson	Drama	Feature film
Return Home	Ray Argall	Dennis Coard, Frankie J. Holden, Ben Mendelsohn, Mickey Camilleri	Drama	Feature film
Sher Mountain Killings Mystery	Vince Martin	Phil Avalon, Tom Richards, Joe Bugner, Ric Carter, Abigail, Ron Becks	Mystery / Thriller	Feature film
Sleep When You're Dead	Clem Maloney	Jaci Edwards, Clem Maloney, Hirokazu Shirado	Documentary	
Struck by Lightning	Jerzy Domaradzki	Gary McDonald, Brian Vriends, Catherine McClements	Drama	Feature film
Swimming	Belinda Chayko	Michelle Linley, Steve Jacobs, Lynette Curran	Short	
The Tales of Helpmann	Don Featherstone	Robert Helpmann, Frederick Ashton, Ninette de Valois, Kate Fitzpatrick	Documentary	
Till There Was You	John Seale	Mark Harmon, Martin Garner, Gregory T. Daniel	Drama	Feature film
Weekend with Kate	Arch Nicholson	Colin Friels, Catherine McClements, Jerome Ehlers	Comedy	Feature film
Wendy Cracked a Walnut	Michael Pattinson	Rosanna Arquette, Bruce Spence, Hugo Weaving	Drama	Feature film aka: "...Almost"
What the Moon Saw	Pino Amenta	Andrew Shephard, Pat Evison, Kim Gyngell	Family	Feature film
The Wonderful World of Dogs	Mark Lewis	Su Cruickshank	Documentary	

== See also ==
- 1990 in Australia
- 1990 in Australian television
