= 1987 in Australian television =

This is a list of events from 1987 in Australian television.

== Events ==
- January – Alan Bond, the owner of QTQ-9 & STW-9, also purchases TCN-9 & GTV-9 from Kerry Packer for $1.055 billion. The expanded Nine Network becomes the first coast-to-coast network.
- January – Long-running ABC music program Countdown launches as Countdown Pirate TV or CDP-TV.
- 5 January – British soap opera series EastEnders debuts on ABC.
- 10 January – Final episode of Australian soap opera Prime Time is being shown on Nine Network as the series was not a popular success.
- February – Fairfax, owners of ATN-7 & BTQ-7 purchase HSV-7 from The Herald and Weekly Times for $320 million. The move sees the replacement of most Melbourne-produced programming with networked programming from Sydney, including long-running shows such as World of Sport & sees Mal Walden sacked as newsreader. The revamped news service, read by former STW-9 newsreader Greg Pearce plunges to as low as zero in the ratings.
- 2 February – Canadian children's series The Kids of Degrassi Street, the first in the Degrassi trilogy series premieres on the ABC.
- 8 February – American sitcom ALF debuts on Seven Network.
- 11 February – Australian comedy series Hey Dad..! debuts on Seven Network.
- 12 February – Australian drama series Rafferty's Rules screens on Seven Network.
- 15 February – Network Ten premieres a brand new Australian music video program called Video Hits.
- 16 February – British children's animated series Henry's Cat makes its debut on the ABC at 3:55 pm.
- 16 February – ABC debuts a brand new weekday afternoon magazine series called The Afternoon Show presented by former Models saxophonist James Valentine. The show begins by airing three programmes per day. One show (The Mysterious Cities of Gold) airs weekdays at 5:00 pm, one (The Return of the Antelope) airs for only two days and the other three (which includes Behind the News, Educating Marmalade and Earthwatch) will be airing on one different day of the week for the 5:30 pm timeslot. The third programme (which is the continuing episodes of The Kids of Degrassi Street) for this show also airs at 6:00 pm on weeknights.
- 26 March – Prime Minister Bob Hawke calls off the proposed amalgamation of the ABC and SBS.
- 27 March - Mal Walden was sacked by new management after HSV-7 was taken over by the Fairfax group. He was told of his dismissal only minutes before going on air to present what became his final news bulletin for the station.
- 5 April – The infamous Grim Reaper advertisement debuts on television.
- 6 April – British children's television series Thomas the Tank Engine & Friends (later Thomas & Friends) debuts on ABC at 3:55 pm.
- 6 April – ABC debuts a brand new comedy series called The Dingo Principle.
- 13 April – ABC weekday afternoon magazine series The Afternoon Show updates its schedule by airing four different programmes on five different days of the week. One show (a brand new Canadian-Scottish drama series called The Campbells) airs from Monday to Thursdays, the other (which is an Australian children's environmental series called Earthwatch now presented by David Smith) now airs only on Fridays, the next programme, a brand new sketch comedy series from Canada titled You Can't Do That on Television airs weekdays at 5:30 pm and the last one includes reruns of the French-American-Canadian animated series Inspector Gadget being shown weeknights at 6:00 pm.
- 17 April – The ABC launches its overnight music video block Rage.
- 20 April – ABC comedy series The Dingo Principle broadcasts a mock interview with the Ayatollah Khomeini, which results in diplomatic tensions with Iran, including the expulsion of two Australian diplomats. Two weeks later, the ABC receives a letter of complaint from the Soviet embassy regarding a skit lampooning Russian figures Mikhail Gorbachev and Vladimir Lenin.
- 4 May – Australian children's weekday and weekend morning series The Cartoon Connection airs on Seven Network in Victoria for the first time starting off with The Herculoids (replacing The Bugs Bunny Show for Mondays to Wednesdays, The Road Runner Show for Thursdays and The Porky Pig Show for Fridays because all three of these shows aired on Seven only in Sydney), The Flintstones, Tom and Jerry and The Partridge Family on weekdays, Yogi's Treasure Hunt, Paw Paws, Galtar and the Golden Lance (replacing ThunderCats, this show first aired in Sydney in 1986, it didn't air in Melbourne until 1989) and Scooby-Doo, Where Are You? on Saturdays and The Smurfs, The Challenge of the GoBots, It's Punky Brewster and Defenders of the Earth on Sundays.
- 8 June – ABC comedy series The Dingo Principle airs its 10th and final episode.
- 25 June – After the ill-fated attempt of the Pirate TV format, the axing of the ABC's long-running music program, Countdown was announced, according to the network's then-managing director David Hill, who has said that the damage was done.
- 1 July – Neighbours screens the wedding of Scott Robinson and Charlene Mitchell, which later in November 1988 saw the most-watched all time episodes in the UK.
- 6 July – Reruns of the British children's television series Thomas the Tank Engine & Friends air on the ABC for the first time. This was also the second time the series had been broadcast.
- 6 July – Debut of British sitcom Executive Stress on ABC.
- July – Westfield buys Network Ten from Rupert Murdoch's News Limited for $842 million.
- 19 July – Countdown broadcasts for the very last time ever with the final Countdown Music and Video Awards from the Sydney Entertainment Centre. In the closing, Molly Meldrum took off his trademark cowboy hat to reveal a bald head, signing off and John Farnham performed "You're the Voice". The last one-hour show was presented by Neighbours stars Guy Pearce, Kylie Minogue and Jason Donovan.
- 31 July – American sitcom The Golden Girls debuts on Seven Network.
- August – New cross-media ownership rules force the sale of the Seven Network. Fairfax sells its stations to Christopher Skase's Qintex company for $780 million.
- 17 August – The ABC broadcasts a lineup of children's morning programmes for the 7:00 am to 10:00 am timeslot for the first time.
- 12 September – Australian gardening and lifestyle programme Burke's Backyard, endorsed by gardener Don Burke, premieres on Nine Network. It was also one of the first of the long line of prime-time "infotainment" and lifestyle programs on commercial television.
- 26 October – A new Australian children's television series called Kaboodle debuts on ABC.
- 23 November – American soap opera The Bold and the Beautiful makes it debut on Network Ten at 1:00 pm.
- 24 November – American action adventure series MacGyver makes its debut on Seven Network at 7:30 pm.
- 2 December – American sitcom Perfect Strangers premieres on Seven Network.
- 27 December – When the new year approaches, Kerry Stokes's ownership of ADS-7 (while owning Network Ten outlets in Perth and Canberra) and TVW-7's ownership of SAS-10, result in the stations deciding to cease broadcasting under swapped callsigns and affiliations. ADS-7 becomes ADS-10 and aligns to the Ten Network and SAS-10 becomes SAS-7 and aligns to the Seven Network.
- Network Ten loses the Winfield Cup rights to the Nine Network after 5 years.

The following quote came from Seven National News reporter Alan Murrell on the 27 December 1987 edition regarding the move:

"Tonight will mark the end of the callsigns ADS-7 and SAS-10. Tomorrow, they be rebranded as ADS-10 and SAS-7. It's the first time such a change has been made. The switch follows a media shake-up earlier this year, which left ADS in the hands of the owners of the Ten Network. Already, the cosmetic changes are being made at Strangways Terrace and Gilberton. But viewers will notice little difference. They'll still turn the knob to Ten for Channel Ten programs, and to Seven for Seven programs.

"The only difference will be that the local personalities will be seen on different channels. So if you want to watch Steve Whitham and Caroline Ainslie reading the news tomorrow night, you simply turn the dial three positions, from Seven-to ADS-10. And it's as easy as that."

== Debuts ==
Program	Network	Debut date
For Love or Money	ABC TV	3 February
Hey Dad...!	Seven Network	11 February
Rafferty's Rules	Seven Network	12 February
Video Hits	Network Ten	15 February
The Afternoon Show	ABC TV	16 February
Willing and Abel	Nine Network	18 February
Pot Luck	Network Ten	23 February
Vietnam	Network Ten	23 February
Camera Script	ABC TV	6 April
The Dingo Principle	ABC TV	6 April
Rage	ABC TV	17 April
Night Shift	Network Ten	April
MTV	Nine Network	April
Fields of Fire	Nine Network	14 June
Relative Merits	ABC TV	15 June
Pals	ABC TV	13 July
University Challenge	ABC TV	1 September
Poor Man's Orange	Network Ten	6 September
Ridgey Didge	Network Ten	7 September
Burke's Backyard	Nine Network	12 September
The Factory	ABC TV	19 September
Kaboodle	ABC TV	26 October
Nancy Wake	Seven Network	4 November
Crossfire	Nine Network	7 December
Rubbish	Nine Network	19 December

== New international programming ==
Program	Network	Debut date
(Canada) Legends of the World	SBS TV	2 January
(United Kingdom) EastEnders	ABC TV	5 January
(United Kingdom) In Sickness and in Health	ABC TV	5 January
(United Kingdom) Oxbridge Blues	ABC TV	7 January
(United States) The Last Sailors	SBS TV	11 January
(United Kingdom) Howards' Way	ABC TV	16 January
(United Kingdom) C.A.T.S. Eyes	Network Ten	20 January
(United Kingdom) Jesus: The Evidence	SBS TV	26 January
(Italy) The Great Oak	SBS TV	27 January
(United Kingdom) Brookside	SBS TV	27 January
(United Kingdom) Paradise Postponed	ABC TV	1 February
(Netherlands) The Wijntak Family	SBS TV	1 February
(United Kingdom) Aubrey	ABC TV	2 February
(Canada) The Kids of Degrassi Street	ABC TV	2 February
(United Kingdom) Crime, Inc.	ABC TV	4 February
(United Kingdom) Who Dares Wins	ABC TV	5 February
(United Kingdom) Dempsey and Makepeace	Seven Network	5 February
(United States) ALF	Seven Network	8 February
(United States) Valerie	Seven Network	8 February
(United Kingdom) Oddie in Paradise	ABC TV	11 February
(United States) My Sister Sam	Nine Network	12 February
(United States) Head of the Class	Nine Network	12 February
(United States) Hulk Hogan's Rock 'n' Wrestling	Network Ten	14 February
(Canada) Today's Special	ABC TV	16 February
(United States) If Tomorrow Comes	Nine Network	16 February
(United Kingdom) Henry's Cat	ABC TV	16 February
(France) / (Japan) The Mysterious Cities of Gold	ABC TV	16 February
(United States) Sins	Network Ten	16 February
(United Kingdom) Return of the Antelope	ABC TV	16 February
(United Kingdom) Let's Go Maths	ABC TV	16 February
(Germany) Mandara	SBS TV	18 February
(United States) Easy Street	Nine Network	23 February
(United States) Dress Gray	Nine Network	23 February
(United States) Yogi's Treasure Hunt	Seven Network	28 February
(United Kingdom) Fragile Earth	ABC TV	28 February
(France) The Second Sex	SBS TV	2 March
(United Kingdom) Barriers	ABC TV	9 March
(United States) George Burns Comedy Week	Seven Network	10 March
(United States) L.A. Law	Network Ten	12 March
(United States) Fluppy Dogs	Seven Network	15 March
(United Kingdom) Alias the Jester	ABC TV	23 March
(Canada) / (Germany) The Little Vampire	Network Ten	31 March
(United States) The Redd Foxx Show	Seven Network	1 April
(Germany) Heimat	SBS TV	5 April
(United Kingdom) Thomas the Tank Engine & Friends	ABC TV	6 April
(United Kingdom) The Raggy Dolls	ABC TV	9 April
(Canada) / (Scotland) The Campbells	ABC TV	13 April
(Canada) You Can't Do That on Television	ABC TV	13 April
(United States) Vidal in Venice	SBS TV	13 April
(United States) The Insiders	Network Ten	15 April
(Germany) Blam!	SBS TV	16 April
(United States) Jim Henson Presents The World of Puppetry	ABC TV	16 April
(United Kingdom) The Adventures of Sherlock Holmes	Seven Network	21 April
(United States) Defenders of the Earth	Seven Network	26 April
(United Kingdom) The Monocled Mutineer	ABC TV	29 April
(United Kingdom) Filthy, Rich and Catflap	ABC TV	30 April
(United States) The Real Ghostbusters	Network Ten	2 May
(United States) Pound Puppies (1986)	Seven Network	2 May
(South Africa) Shaka Zulu	Nine Network	6 May
(United Kingdom) Understanding the Under 12s	ABC TV	8 May
(United Kingdom) Jimbo and the Jet-Set	ABC TV	11 May
(United Kingdom) There Comes a Time	Seven Network	14 May
(United Kingdom) The Life and Loves of a She-Devil	Seven Network	19 May
(United Kingdom) Langley Bottom	ABC TV	27 May
(United States) Matlock	Nine Network	27 May
(United States) Donald Duck's 50th Birthday	Network Ten (Sydney)	30 May
(Canada) Cities	SBS TV	3 June
(New Zealand) The Krypton Factor	ABC TV	18 June
(United States) Designing Women	Nine Network	22 June
(United Kingdom) Cyprus: Britain's Grim Legacy	SBS TV	29 June
(United States) Silverhawks	Seven Network	4 July
(United States) Kissyfur	Seven Network	5 July
(United Kingdom) Executive Stress	ABC TV	6 July
(France) Once Upon a Time... Space	SBS TV	6 July
(Norway) Teacher Haze	ABC TV	6 July
(United Kingdom) Lovejoy	ABC TV	7 July
(United Kingdom) Lytton's Diary	ABC TV	8 July
(United Kingdom) The Troubles	SBS TV	20 July
(United Kingdom) The Return of Sherlock Holmes	Seven Network	21 July
(United States) Peter the Great	Nine Network	26 July
(United States) The Golden Girls	Seven Network	31 July
(United Kingdom) Cockleshell Bay	Network Ten	1 August
(United States) The Great Space Coaster	Network Ten	11 August
(Czech Republic) Mysterious Island	SBS TV	14 August
(United States) Popples	Nine Network	15 August
(United Kingdom) The Family Ness	ABC TV	17 August
(France) Robo Story	ABC TV	17 August
(United States) Out on a Limb	Nine Network	17 August
(United Kingdom) Hold the Dream	ABC TV	19 August
(United Kingdom) First Among Equals	Network Ten	19 August
(United Kingdom) All in Good Faith	ABC TV	24 August
(United Kingdom) Three Up, Two Down	ABC TV	31 August
(Socialist Federal Republic of Yugoslavia) Hang in There, Floki	SBS TV	1 September
(United Kingdom) The First Eden	ABC TV	6 September
(Japan) / (Canada) The Wonderful Wizard of Oz	ABC TV	17 September
(Australia) / (United States) The Berenstain Bears	ABC TV	21 September
(France) Colette	SBS TV	26 September
(United States) The Flintstone Kids	Seven Network	26 September
(United Kingdom) Paddington's Birthday Bonanza	ABC TV	28 September
(United Kingdom) Chocky's Challenge	ABC TV	5 October
(United States) Ghostbusters	ABC TV	5 October
(United Kingdom) Connie	Nine Network	7 October
(France) The Land and the Mill	SBS TV	8 October
(United States) DuckTales	Seven Network	11 October
(United States) Anastasia: The Mystery of Anna	Seven Network	14 October
(Poland) The House	SBS TV	18 October
(United Kingdom) Mr. Palfrey of Westminster	ABC TV	21 October
(United Kingdom) Bulman	Nine Network	27 October
(United States) Monte Carlo	Network Ten	2 November
(Canada) Lorne Greene's New Wilderness	ABC TV	7 November
(United States) Better Days	Seven Network	9 November
(United Kingdom) Slinger's Day	ABC TV	16 November
(United States) Sidekicks	Seven Network	22 November
(United States) The Bold and the Beautiful	Network Ten	23 November
(United Kingdom) Bread	ABC TV	23 November
(United States) Santa Barbara	Network Ten	23 November
(United States) Spies	Seven Network	24 November
(United States) MacGyver	Seven Network	24 November
(United Kingdom) High and Dry	Seven Network	25 November
(United Kingdom) Codename	Nine Network	26 November
(United States) Life with Lucy	Nine Network	27 November
(United States) Misfits of Science	Seven Network	27 November
(United States) Fortune Dane	Seven Network	28 November
(United States) Shadow Chasers	Nine Network	2 December
(United States) Perfect Strangers	Seven Network	2 December
(United States) Crime Story	Network Ten	6 December
(United Kingdom) The Refuge	Seven Network	7 December
(United States) Comedy Break	ABC TV	8 December
(Japan) Belle and Sebastian	ABC TV	8 December
(United Kingdom) The Singing Detective	ABC TV	13 December
(United Kingdom) Puddle Lane	ABC TV	14 December
(United Kingdom) Baby and Co.	ABC TV	14 December
(United Kingdom) Dodger, Bonzo and the Rest	ABC TV	14 December
(United Kingdom) Gems	ABC TV	14 December
(United Kingdom) Mapp and Lucia	Seven Network	14 December
(United Kingdom) Tucker's Luck	ABC TV	14 December
(United Kingdom) Murder of a Moderate Man	ABC TV	15 December
(United States) The Pee-wee Herman Show	ABC TV	18 December
(United States) Carlton Your Doorman	Nine Network	19 December
(Canada) / (France) Babar and Father Christmas	ABC TV	25 December
(United States) The Cavanaughs	ABC TV	28 December
(United States) The Ellen Burstyn Show	Seven Network	28 December
(United Kingdom) Supergran	Nine Network	1987
(United States) Our House	Seven Network	1987

=== Changes to network affiliation ===
This is a list of programs which made their premiere on an Australian television network that had previously premiered on another Australian television network. The networks involved in the switch of allegiances are predominantly both free-to-air networks or both subscription television networks. Programs that have their free-to-air/subscription television premiere, after previously premiering on the opposite platform (free-to air to subscription/subscription to free-to air) are not included. In some cases, programs may still air on the original television network. This occurs predominantly with programs shared between subscription television networks.

==== Domestic ====
Program	New network(s)	Previous network(s)	Date
Mother and Son	Network Ten	ABC TV	February
Butterfly Island	Seven Network	ABC TV	20 April

==== International ====
Program	New network(s)	Previous network(s)	Date
(United States) The New Scooby-Doo Movies	Seven Network	Nine Network	7 February
(United States) Scooby-Doo, Where Are You?	Seven Network	Nine Network	18 April
(United States) Donald Duck's 50th Birthday	Seven Network (Melbourne)	Network Ten	19 July
(United States) Finder of Lost Loves	Seven Network	Network Ten	23 September
(United States) Scooby and Scrappy-Doo	Seven Network	Nine Network	26 September

== Television shows ==
=== 1950s ===
- Mr. Squiggle (1959–1999)

=== 1960s ===
- Four Corners (1961–present)

=== 1970s ===
- Hey Hey It's Saturday (1971–1999, 2009–2010)
- Young Talent Time (1971–1989)
- Countdown (1974–1987)
- 60 Minutes (1979–present)

=== 1980s ===
- Wheel of Fortune (1981–2008)
- Sunday (1981–2008)
- Today (1982–present)
- Perfect Match (1984–present)
- Neighbours (1985–present)
- The Flying Doctors (1986–1993)
- Rage (1987–present)

== Ending this year ==
Date	Show	Channel	Debut
22 March	World of Sport	Seven Melbourne	1959
10 January	Prime Time	Nine Network	1986
10 April 1987	Camera Script	ABC	6 April 1987
8 June 1987	The Dingo Principle	ABC	6 April 1987
18 June	The Girl from Steel City	SBS	1986
19 July	Countdown	ABC	1974
17 August	Relative Merits	ABC	15 June 1987
19 August	Sons and Daughters	Channel Seven	1982
29 August	The Henderson Kids	Channel Ten	1985
11 September	It's a Knockout	Channel Ten	1985
18 September	The New Adventures of Blinky Bill	ABC	1984
5 November	Nancy Wake	Channel Seven	4 November 1987
29 December	The Fast Lane	ABC	1985

== See also ==
- 1987 in Australia
- List of Australian films of 1987
