= 1987 in Australia =

- Monarch: Elizabeth II
- Governor-General: Sir Ninian Stephen
- Prime minister: Bob Hawke
- Population: 16,263,874
- Elections: NT, Federal

The following lists events that happened during 1987 in Australia.

- Decades: 1960s; 1970s; 1980s; 1990s; 2000s
- See also: 1987 in Australian television; 1987 in Australian literature; Other events of 1987; Federal election; Timeline of Australian history

== Incumbents ==
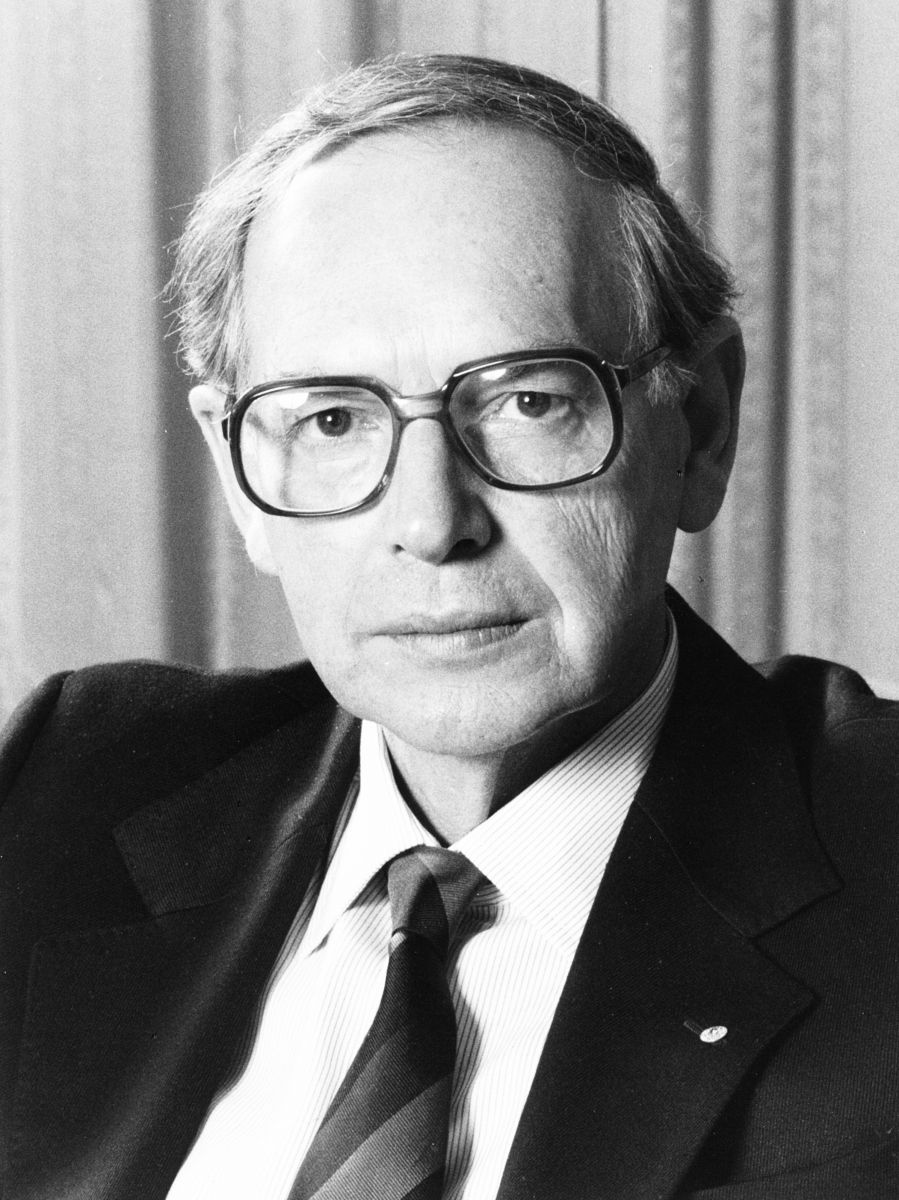
Sir Ninian Stephen

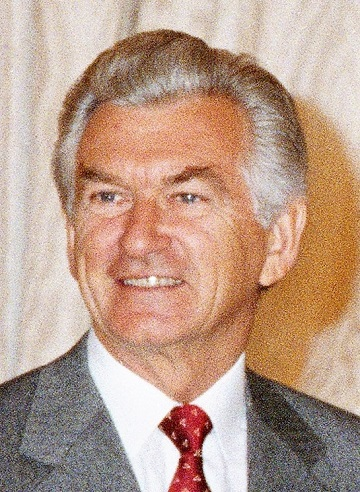
Bob Hawke

- Monarch – Elizabeth II
- Governor-General – Sir Ninian Stephen
- Prime Minister – Bob Hawke
  - Deputy Prime Minister – Lionel Bowen
  - Opposition Leader – John Howard
- Chief Justice – Sir Harry Gibbs (until 5 February) then Sir Anthony Mason

=== State and territory leaders ===
- Premier of New South Wales – Barrie Unsworth
  - Opposition Leader – Nick Greiner
- Premier of Queensland – Sir Joh Bjelke-Petersen (until 1 December), then Mike Ahern
  - Opposition Leader – Nev Warburton
- Premier of South Australia – John Bannon
  - Opposition Leader – John Olsen
- Premier of Tasmania – Robin Gray
  - Opposition Leader – Neil Batt
- Premier of Victoria – John Cain Jr.
  - Opposition Leader – Jeff Kennett
- Premier of Western Australia – Brian Burke
  - Opposition Leader – Barry MacKinnon
- Chief Minister of the Northern Territory – Stephen Hatton
  - Opposition Leader – Terry Smith
- President of the Legislative Assembly of Norfolk Island – John Brown

=== Governors and administrators ===
- Governor of New South Wales – Sir James Rowland
- Governor of Queensland – Sir Walter Campbell
- Governor of South Australia – Sir Donald Dunstan
- Governor of Tasmania – Sir James Plimsoll (until 8 May), then Sir Phillip Bennett
- Governor of Victoria – Davis McCaughey
- Governor of Western Australia – Gordon Reid
- Administrator of Norfolk Island – John Matthew
- Administrator of the Northern Territory – Eric Johnston

== Events ==
=== January ===
- 31 January – A rally in Wagga Wagga, New South Wales, of new ultra-right Grassroots 2000 represents a declaration of war by Queensland Premier Sir Joh Bjelke-Petersen and the religious right on the "wets" and "losers" in the Liberal Party of Australia such as Ian Macphee, Peter Baume, Chris Puplick, Robert Hill, Steele Hall and Max Burr. The movement is predicated on the populist appeal of a flat tax, the suppression of trade union power and small government.

=== February ===
- 4 February – Federal Opposition Leader John Howard launches the Opposition's election strategy, promising lower taxes, family policies, needs-based social welfare, and an end to the fringe benefits tax. His coining of the word "incentivation" draws some derision.
- 6 February –
  - Sir Anthony Mason replaces Sir Harry Gibbs as Chief Justice of the High Court of Australia. With other retirements, for the first time the High Court contains no former politicians.
  - Mary Gaudron is sworn in as the first female Justice of the High Court of Australia.
- 8 February – 9 February – Worried by the damage to their electoral prospects, John Howard, Ian Sinclair and Liberal President John Valder unite to pour scorn on Sir Joh Bjelke-Petersen's federal pretensions, hoping that common sense will dissolve the "initial seduction of simplistic solutions".
- 23 February – The first mobile phone call in Australia is made.
- 28 February – The Central Council of the Queensland National Party decides to withdraw its 12 federal MPs from the Coalition. They officially leave on 10 April.

=== March ===
- 7 March – An election in the Northern Territory returns CLP government of Stephen Hatton to power.
- 23 March – Following the publication of transcripts of damaging car phone conversations between Jeff Kennett and Andrew Peacock, John Howard dismisses Andrew Peacock from the Shadow Cabinet.
- 26 March – Peter Baume resigns from the Shadow Cabinet because of the Liberal Party's opposition to equal opportunity legislation.

=== April ===
- 15 April – Ian Sinclair and John Howard sign a Coalition Agreement which formalises the split with the Queensland Nationals.
- 21 April – Federal Opposition Leader John Howard reshuffles the Shadow Cabinet, omitting the remaining "wet" Ian Macphee and elevating more "dries".
- 28 April – The Coalition comes to a temporary end when Liberal Leader John Howard excoriates Sir Joh Bjelke-Petersen and Queensland National Party President Sir Robert Sparkes as "wreckers".

=== May ===
- 28 May – Only 8 weeks after promising no early poll, but unable to resist the opportunity afforded by Coalition disarray, Prime Minister Bob Hawke calls a double dissolution election, the trigger used being the Senate's rejection of the Australia Card legislation. The National Party of Australia's campaign collapses as Sir Joh Bjelke-Petersen is out of the country when the election is called.

=== June ===
- 16 June – Crazed German tourist Joseph Schwab, known as the "Kimberley killer", is shot dead in a shootout with Western Australia Police at Fitzroy Crossing. Schwab had already killed three people that day, and two others a week previously in the Northern Territory.
- 23 June – Launching a long campaign at the Sydney Opera House, Prime Minister Bob Hawke promises that "no child will be living in poverty by the year 1990" and woos the environmental vote by promising no mining in Kakadu.
- 25 June – Federal Opposition Leader John Howard makes his policy speech as a rousing call to middle Australia.

=== July ===
- 11 July – With a good deal of help from the Joh for Canberra campaign which splits the conservative vote between his National Party and the Liberal Party's John Howard, Bob Hawke's Australian Labor Party government is re-elected for a third term. Labor wins six Queensland seats from the Coalition. A net gain of four seats despite a 1.7% fall in their primary vote gives the Labor Party 86 seats to the Liberals' 43 and Nationals' 19. In the Senate, seven Australian Democrats senators again hold the balance.
- 16 July – John Howard retains the Liberal leadership, beating Andrew Peacock in the post-election party room spill 41:28. He is forced to accept his rival as deputy when Andrew Peacock beats Fred Chaney 36:24.
- 24 July – Prime Minister Bob Hawke undertakes a major reorganisation of the Commonwealth Public Service, reducing the number of departments from 27 to 17, 8 of them "super" departments covering a range of areas. John Dawkins becomes Minister for Employment, Education and Training and Graham Richardson receives the Environment and the Arts portfolio.

=== August ===
- 9 August – Seven people are killed and 19 injured when 19-year-old Julian Knight goes on a shooting rampage in Melbourne – the (Hoddle St Massacre).
- 14 August – All the children held at Kia Lama, a rural property on Lake Eildon run by the Santiniketan Park Association, are released after a police raid.
- 17 August – Tony Eggleton's reforms to tighten the Liberal Party of Australia's discipline and procedures are accepted at the Federal Executive meeting. Liberal Leader John Howard then reconstructs his Coalition with the 26 Nationals, only four of whom had opposed the restoration of the agreement.

=== September ===
- 23 September – The increasingly unpopular Australia Card is abandoned when retired public servant Ewart Sith points out that although the Bill could be passed at a joint sitting, it could not be put into practice due to poor drafting, which has omitted a starting date – the regulation to set one would have to go to a still hostile Senate.

=== October ===
- 3 October – Australia finally notes the contribution of the Vietnam War veterans with a Welcome Home parade held in Sydney – 15 years after the last soldiers and national service men have returned.
- 20 October – Black Monday: After the largest fall in the Dow Jones's history, stock markets nosedive around the world. Australia is no exception as the All Ordinaries falls 25%, making it the biggest one-day drop in the market's history.

=== November ===
- 13 November – Despite support from Queensland Premier Sir Joh Bjelke-Petersen, enabling legislation for the construction of the planned 107-storey Minuzzo Tower is deferred. Deferment was called for by National Party backbenchers, so that guidelines could be drawn up for super-high rise structures of more than 60 storeys. The planned tower would have been the world's tallest building.
- 24 November – Queensland Premier Sir Joh Bjelke-Petersen sacks three ministers from his cabinet, accusing them of gross disloyalty.
- 26 November – The National Party deposes Sir Joh Bjelke-Petersen as party leader, but he refuses to resign as premier. He was not present at the caucus meeting.

=== December ===
- 1 December – Sir Joh Bjelke-Petersen resigns as Premier of Queensland after 19 years at the top. He is replaced by Mike Ahern, who becomes the only premier never to contest an election as premier.
- 8 December –
  - Queen Street Massacre: 22-year-old Frank Vitkovic kills 8 and injures another 5 in an Australia Post office building in Queen Street, Melbourne before committing suicide by jumping from the 11th floor.
  - The Queensland Premier's Department releases a list of 60 companies which had expressed an interest in developing Australia's first space port in Queensland's Cape York area.
- 29 December – 19-year-old Neighbours star Kylie Minogue enters the charts with her first single "I Should Be So Lucky".
- 31 December – Senator Susan Ryan, Minister assisting the Prime Minister for the Status of Women, resigns to take a private sector job. The post is demoted outside Cabinet under her successor Margaret Reynolds. Former Australian Labor Party Federal Secretary Bob McMullan takes over Susan Ryan's Senate term.

== Arts and literature ==
- Glenda Adams's novel Dancing on Coral wins the Miles Franklin Award

== Film ==
- Howling III
- Travelling North
- The Lighthorsemen
- The Year My Voice Broke

== Television ==
- January – Alan Bond, who already owns QTQ-9 & STW-9 purchases TCN-9 & GTV-9 from Kerry Packer for $1.055 billion. The expanded Nine Network becomes the first coast-to-coast network.
- February – Fairfax, owners of ATN-7 & BTQ-7 purchase HSV-7 from The Herald and Weekly Times Ltd for $320 million. The move sees the replacement of most Melbourne-produced programming with networked programming from Sydney, including long-running shows such as World of Sport & sees Mal Walden sacked as newsreader. The revamped news service, read by former STW-9 newsreader Greg Pearce plunges to as low as zero in the ratings.
- 6 April – Long running UK children's television series Thomas the Tank Engine & Friends gets its first Australian television transmission on ABC.
- July – Westfield buys Network Ten from Rupert Murdoch's News Limited for $842 million.
- 19 July – Long-running ABC music program Countdown broadcasts its final episode.
- August – New cross-media ownership rules force the sale of the Seven Network. Fairfax sells its stations to Christopher Skase's Qintex company for $780 million.
- 27 December – Rupert Murdoch's ownership of ADS-7, combined with TVW-7's ownership of SAS-10, result in the stations deciding to swap callsigns & affiliations. So, on this day, ADS-7 becomes ADS-10 & SAS-10 becomes SAS-7.

== Sport ==
- 4 February – The 1987 America's Cup ends in Perth with the US regaining the America's Cup after Australia won it in 1983 as the first Nation ever after US-Teams won it 25 times for 132 years in a row.
- 22 March – Steve Moneghetti is Australia's best finisher in the men's competition at the IAAF World Cross Country Championships, staged in Warsaw, Poland. He finishes in 11th place (37:11.0) in the long-distance race over 11,950 metres. In the women's competition Krishna Stanton ends up in 8th place in the long event (5.050 metres).
- 27 March – The Brisbane Bears (now the Brisbane Lions) make their debut in the VFL. At the MCG, the Bears upset North Melbourne 19.23.137 to 15.12.104.
- 29 March – The West Coast Eagles make their debut in the Victorian Football League. At Subiaco Oval, they defeat the Richmond Tigers 20.13.133 to 16.12.119.
- 5 April – It is announced that Newcastle will join the NSWRL in 1988. They are later joined by Brisbane and the Gold Coast to form a 16-team competition.
- 7 June – Daniel Boltz wins the men's national marathon title, clocking 2:14:36 in Sydney, while Tani Ruckle claims the women's title in 2:37:53.
- 15 July – Queensland win the 1987 State of Origin series by defeating New South Wales 10–8 in the third and deciding game.
- 26 September – The Carlton Blues (15.14.104) defeat the Hawthorn Hawks (9.17.71) to win the 91st VFL/AFL premiership.
- 27 September – Manly-Warringah Sea Eagles defeat the Canberra Raiders 18–8 to win the 80th NSWRL premiership. It is the last grand final ever to be played at the SCG. The Western Suburbs Magpies finish in last position, claiming the wooden spoon.
- The Dally M Medal and the Rothmans Medal are won by Parramatta Eels halfback Peter Sterling.
- The Clive Churchill medal for man of the match is won by Manly-Warringah Sea Eagles five-eighth Cliff Lyons.
- The Brownlow Medal is shared by John Platten (Hawthorn) and Tony Lockett (St Kilda). Lockett becomes the first full-forward to win the Brownlow Medal.

== Births ==
- 15 January – Greg Inglis, rugby league footballer
- 18 January – Tom Stray, cricketer
- 19 January – Angus Monfries, Australian footballer
- 30 January
  - Ben Cutting, cricketer
  - Lance Franklin, Australian Rules footballer
- 13 February – David smith, sprint canoeist
- 15 February – Jarrod Sammut, rugby league player
- 21 February – Heli Simpson, actress, singer, dancer, equestrian, comedian, and doctor
- 27 February – Bridie Kean, wheelchair basketball player
- 18 April – Samantha Jade, singer
- 30 April – Nikki Webster, singer and model
- 1 May – Marcus Drum, Australian footballer
- 26 May – Josh Thomas, comedian and actor
- 27 May – Bella Heathcote, actress
- 5 June – Shea Moylan, rugby league player
- 12 June – Abbey Lee, actress and model
- 17 June – Rebecca Breeds, actress
- 22 June – Lara Worthington, model and social media personality
- 30 June – Tim Blanchard, racing driver
- 15 July – Jimmy Rees, entertainer
- 17 July
  - Gemma Beadsworth, water polo player
  - Darius Boyd, rugby league footballer
- 27 July – Simon Dunn, bobsledder (died 2023)
- 31 July – Brittany Byrnes, actress
- 10 August – Damon Heta, professional darts player
- 16 August
  - Evan Berger, footballer
  - Kyal Marsh, actor
- 18 August – Robert McNamara, figure skater
- 21 August – Kerser, rapper
- 1 October – Mitchell Aubusson, rugby league player
- 18 October – Sam Clark, actor
- 29 October – Cleopatra Coleman, actress
- 10 November – Jessica Tovey, actress
- 11 November – Giles Matthey, actor
- 10 December – Ben Nicholas, actor
- 21 December – Brad Howard, Australian rules footballer

== Deaths ==
- 3 April – Lynda Heaven, first female Labor MHR in Tasmania (b. 1902)
- 14 April – Brian Carlson, rugby league player (b. 1933)
- 26 June – Sir Billy Snedden, lawyer and politician, 18th Leader of the Opposition (b. 1926)
- 5 July – Karna Maria Birmingham, artist, illustrator and print maker (b. 1900)
- 15 July – Eric Worrell, naturalist and science writer, established Australian Reptile Park (b. 1924)
- 28 July – Jack Renshaw, 31st Premier of New South Wales (b. 1909)
- 17 August – Olga Agnew, child actress (b. 1899)

== See also ==
- 1987 in Australian television
- List of Australian films of 1987
