= 1988 in Australian television =

== Events ==
- 1 January – Australia Live, a four-hour celebration welcoming a year of celebrations for Australia's bicentennial of European settlement airs on the ABC, SBS, the Nine Network and regional solus stations. It also aired in the U.S. on A&E.
- 2 January – Imparja starts broadcasting to remote Central Australia via satellite It would have its official launch on 15 January.
- 17 January – The first episode of Home and Away one of the longest running Australian TV soaps since Neighbours airs on Seven Network
- 24 January – Ten launches Richmond Hill, a Grundy Organisation production, created by Reg Watson. Billed as a sister-soap to Neighbours, it airs on Wednesdays and Thursdays at 19:30-20:30.
- January – Five months after Countdown's demise, Molly Meldrum returns to television and joins Nine's Hey Hey It's Saturday as part of the weekly Molly's Melodrama segment.
- 18 January – A Current Affair launches on the Nine Network after a ten-year absence, hosted by Jana Wendt.
- 24 January – Network Ten unveils new logo, the "X" logo.
- February – Seven Network launches Family Feud.
- 8 February – Canadian teen drama series Degrassi Junior High, the second in the Degrassi trilogy series debuts on the ABC.
- 16 February – The Comedy Company starring Mark Mitchell (Con The Fruitier), Glenn Robbins (Uncle Arthur), Mary-Anne Fahey (Kylie Mole), Ian McFayden, Kim Gyngell (Col'n Carpenter), Chris Keogh, Russell Gilbert, Siobhan Tuke, Paula Gardener and Peter Rowsthorn debuts on Channel Ten (1988–1990).
- 7 March – The ABC begins airing their only Rankin/Bass animated series, The Comic Strip.
- 12 March – Nine Network broadcasts its Australian premiere of the American police procedural television series 21 Jump Street.
- 20 March – The Nine Network takes over the Rugby league rights from Network Ten, which they continue to broadcast to the present day.
- 26 March – In Neighbours, Daphne Clarke becomes the first character in history to die to do so after being in a coma in a car crash four months earlier.
- 28 March – The ABC's current affairs program Four Corners presents a television special called Wither the ABC? which was a debate over the future direction of the national broadcaster. Hosted by Andrew Olle there will be interviews with ABC managing director David Hill, Gareth Evans, Max Walsh, Terry Hayes, Peter Luck and Ted Thomas.
- 28 March – Blah Blah Blah a new Australian comedy series premieres on Australian Broadcasting Corporation at 9:50pm and at 10:45pm. It was hosted by Andrew Denton which also marked his very first hosting role.
- 18 April – The ABC launches an afternoon block for younger children at 4:30 pm called Stop at this Station. This block will include animated television series from overseas such as Alias the Jester and the live-action series Tales from Fat Tulip's Garden.
- 25 April – The 10:30 pm timeslot becomes an unlikely battle ground as Graham Kennedy returns to the Nine Network after a 13 years absence to co-host Graham Kennedy's News Show (re-titled Graham Kennedy's Coast to Coast when the show returns for 1989) up against Seven Network's Newsworld with Clive Robertson and Network Ten's Late Night Australia with Don Lane.
- 29 April – QSTV (now Seven Central) starts broadcasting to remote Eastern Australia via satellite.
- 20 May – Perth's third commercial television station NEW-10 opens, giving Perth the same number of stations as the eastern states.
- 18 May – In Neighbours, Madge Mitchell and Harold Bishop marry.
- 20 June – ABC debuts a new children's sketch TV series called Swap Shop (based on the British Saturday Morning children's programme of the same name) at 4:30 pm.
- June – After six months of middling ratings, Ten Network cancels struggling soap opera, Richmond Hill, with production ending later in the year. Coincidentally, the new serial had just been purchased by the ITV network for broadcast in the United Kingdom.
- 17 July – In Neighbours, this was Charlene Robinson's final episode. Kylie Minogue leaves the show to focus on her recently launched recording career.
- 10 September – Brisbane's TVQ-0 becomes TVQ-10. On the same day, Toowoomba's DDQ-10 became DDQ-0.
- October – Lee Lin Chin defects from ABC Local Radio and moves to SBS Television.
- 3 October – Long running Australian soap opera Home and Away starts airing on Network 2 (originally RTÉ2) in Ireland.
- 5 October – Ten Network's soap opera, Richmond Hill, launches on the ITV network in Britain. Originally intended to air early evening across the country, its cancellation in Australia leads to it airing in a graveyard mid-afternoon slot and it makes no impact whatsoever.
- 24-25 October – In Neighbours, Mrs. Mangel marries Englishman John Worthington, immigrate to the UK and lived happily ever after.
- 31 October – The British long running science fiction series Doctor Who returns to the ABC with the very first serial of Season 24 Time and the Rani, which marked the first episode to star Sylvester McCoy as the Doctor. Because the show is no longer airing at an early evening timeslot, it now airs as part of the hit weekday afternoon magazine series The Afternoon Show at 5:30 pm. The show will also end on 23 November with the last part of Remembrance of the Daleks to celebrate the series' 25th anniversary.
- November – Australian soap opera Home and Away airs on television in Canada for the first time on the country's already newly launched cable television channel YTV.
- 4 November – In Neighbours, Bronwyn Davies (Rachel Friend) and Henry Ramsay (Craig McLachlan) get together.
- Christopher Skase buys Perth's TVW-7 & SAS-7 from Alan Bond's Bell Group for $130 million, meaning that all stations in the Seven Network were owned by the one company for the first time.
- 12 December – Final episode of Neighbours for 1988 airs on Network Ten with a Ramsay Street Christmas Party and Jane Harris proposes to Mark Granger.

== Debuts ==
=== Domestic ===
- 17 January – Home and Away (Seven Network, 1988 – present)
- 18 January – A Current Affair (Nine Network)
- 27 January – Richmond Hill (Network Ten, 1988 – 1989)
- 29 January – Overseas and Undersold (ABC TV, 1988 – 1991)
- 7 February – Compass (ABC TV, 1988 – present)
- 16 February – The Comedy Company (Network Ten, 1988 – 1990)
- 29 February – c/o The Bartons (ABC TV, 1988)
- 27 March – Touch the Sun (ABC TV, 1988)
- 28 March – Blah Blah Blah (ABC TV)
- 10 April – The Dirtwater Dynasty (Network Ten, 1988)
- 18 April – Stop at this Station (ABC TV, 1988 – 1990)
- 19 April – Alien Years (ABC TV, 1988)
- 23 April – Seven's Super Saturday (Seven Network, 1988 – 1990)
- 27 April – The Last Resort (ABC TV, 1988)
- 30 May – Mulligrubs (Network Ten, 1988 – 1996)
- 20 June – Swap Shop (ABC TV, 1988 – 1989)
- 28 June – Just for the Record (Network Ten)
- 29 June – The Gerry Connolly Show (ABC TV, 1988)
- 10 July – House Rules (ABC TV, 1988)
- 25 July – The Oz Game (ABC TV, 1988 – 1989)
- 1 September – Bush Tucker Man (ABC TV 1988 – 1990)
- Family Feud (Seven Network, 1988 – 1996)

=== New international programming ===
- 3 January – (United Kingdom) Durrell in Russia (ABC TV)
- 3 January – (United States) Dinosaur! (Seven Network)
- 4 January – (Canada) Spirit Bay (ABC TV)
- 12 January – (Denmark) A Pot of Gold (SBS TV)
- 13 January – (United States) Shell Game (Nine Network)
- 22 January – (United Kingdom) Our Backyard (ABC TV)
- 27 January – (United States) The Days and Nights of Molly Dodd (ABC TV)
- 28 January – (United Kingdom) Skorpion (ABC TV)
- 29 January – (United Kingdom) Who Sir? Me Sir? (ABC TV)
- 1 February – (United States) The Tracey Ullman Show (ABC TV)
- 7 February – (United States) The Tale of the Bunny Picnic (Network Ten)
- 8 February – (Canada) Degrassi Junior High (ABC TV)
- 9 February – (United States) Sledge Hammer! (Network Ten)
- 9 February – (United States) Hooperman (Network Ten)
- 13 February – (Italy) The Inspector's Kids (SBS TV)
- 13 February – (Netherlands) Thomas and Senior (SBS TV)
- 14 February – (United States) Dolly (Network Ten)
- 15 February – (United States) Tour of Duty (Network Ten)
- 16 February – (United Kingdom) The Dame Edna Experience (Seven Network)
- 17 February – (Sweden) Bill and Bunny (ABC TV)
- 18 February – (United States) Leo & Liz in Beverly Hills (Network Ten)
- 24 February – (United States) My Two Dads (Nine Network)
- 1 March – (New Zealand) Erebus: The Aftermath (ABC TV)
- 3 March – (United States) Jake and the Fatman (Nine Network)
- 3 March – (United Kingdom) A Very Peculiar Practice (ABC TV)
- 6 March – (United States) Noble House (Network Ten)
- 7 March – (United States) The Comic Strip (ABC TV)
- 11 March – (United Kingdom) Rude Health (Nine Network)
- 12 March – (United States) 21 Jump Street (Nine Network)
- 14 March – (United Kingdom) The Story of English (SBS TV)
- 14 March – (Soviet Union) Tass is Authorized to Announce (SBS TV)
- 20 March – (United States) Sky Commanders (Seven Network)
- 21 March – (United Kingdom) The Children of Green Knowe (ABC TV)
- 22 March – (Canada) Check It Out! (Network Ten)
- 2 April – (United States) Houston Knights (Nine Network)
- 3 April – (United States) Cosmos: Special Edition (Nine Network)
- 8 April – (United Kingdom) Chance in a Million (ABC TV)
- 17 April – (United States) The Lucie Arnaz Show (Network Ten)
- 17 April – (United Kingdom) An Audience with Peter Ustinov (ABC TV)
- 23 April – (United States) ALF: The Animated Series (Seven Network)
- 25 April – (United Kingdom) Dream Stuffing (ABC TV)
- 25 April – (United States) Charlie & Co. (Network Ten)
- 28 April – (United Kingdom) The Brothers McGregor (Network Ten)
- 28 April – (United Kingdom) The Duty Men (ABC TV)
- 4 May – (United Kingdom) Spear of the Nation: The Story of the African National Congress (SBS TV)
- 19 May – (United States) Unsolved Mysteries (Seven Network)
- 24 May – (United States) Alfred Hitchcock Presents (1985) (Network Ten)
- 26 May – (United Kingdom) Ever Decreasing Circles (Seven Network)
- 9 June – (United States) Out of This World (Network Ten)
- 12 June – (United Kingdom) The Day the Universe Changed (SBS TV)
- 13 June – (United States) Brush Strokes (ABC TV)
- 15 June – (United States) Downtown (Nine Network)
- 16 June – (United Kingdom) A Perfect Spy (ABC TV)
- 22 June – (United Kingdom) Mann's Best Friends (Seven Network)
- 24 June – (Canada) / (United States) Captain Power and the Soldiers of the Future (Nine Network)
- 27 June – (United States) Starman (Network Ten)
- 28 June – (United Kingdom) Gnostics (SBS TV)
- 30 June – (United States) Brothers (Seven Network)
- 4 July – (United States) AfterMASH (Network Ten)
- 4 July – (France) Spartakus and the Sun Beneath the Sea (ABC TV)
- 5 July – (United States) Half Nelson (Network Ten)
- 6 July – (United Kingdom) The Telebugs (ABC TV)
- 7 July – (United Kingdom) Hot House People (ABC TV)
- 10 July – (United States) Foofur (Seven Network)
- 11 July – (United Kingdom) The Comedians (Network Ten)
- 15 July – (United Kingdom) Fortunes of War (ABC TV)
- 16 July – (United States) Werewolf (Nine Network)
- 18 July – (United States) Frank's Place (Nine Network)
- 20 July – (Greece) The Disappearance of John Avlakiotis (SBS TV)
- 20 July – (United States) Powerhouse (ABC TV)
- 22 July – (Czechoslovakia) Tales from the Lower Town (SBS TV)
- 23 July – (United Kingdom) The Taste of Health (SBS TV)
- 1 August – (United States) Beauty and the Beast (1987) (Seven Network)
- 6 August – (United States) Popeye and Son (Seven Network)
- 8 August – (United States) The New Adventures of Beans Baxter (ABC TV)
- 8 August – (United Kingdom) Don't Miss Wax (ABC TV)
- 8 August – (United Kingdom) Worlds Beyond (ABC TV)
- 11 August – (United States) Me and Mom (Nine Network)
- 15 August – (United States) Fresno (Nine Network)
- 23 August – (Spain) Joy and Shadows (SBS TV)
- 23 August – (United Kingdom) Floodtide (ABC TV)
- 24 August – (United Kingdom) Dead Entry (ABC TV)
- 24 August – (United Kingdom) AIDS Now (SBS TV)
- 28 August – (United Kingdom) The Fear (ABC TV)
- 30 August – (United Kingdom) Blackadder II (Seven Network)
- 5 September – (United Kingdom) / (New Zealand) Worzel Gummidge Down Under (ABC TV)
- 19 September – The Japan Project (SBS TV)
- 23 September – (United Kingdom) The New Statesman (Seven Network)
- 24 September – (United States) BraveStarr (Nine Network)
- 24 September – (United States) Mighty Mouse: The New Adventures (Nine Network)
- 24 September – (United States) / (Canada) Dinosaucers (Nine Network)
- 1 October – (Japan) / (United States) Bionic Six (Network Ten)
- 1 October – (United States) / (Canada) The Adventures of Teddy Ruxpin (Network Ten)
- 2 October – (United Kingdom) Maharajas (ABC TV)
- 4 October – (United States) Sable (Network Ten)
- 7 October – (United Kingdom) Buddy (ABC TV)
- 9 October – (Australia) / (New Zealand) The Rainbow Warrior Conspiracy (Seven Network)
- 10 October – (United States) Alice in Wonderland (1985) (Nine Network)
- 18 October – (United Kingdom) One More Audience with Dame Edna Everage (Seven Network)
- 28 October – (New Zealand) The Haunting of Barney Palmer (ABC TV)
- 5 November – (Canada) Hot Shots (Seven Network)
- 8 November – (United States) Down and Out in Beverly Hills (Seven Network)
- 9 November – (United Kingdom) Tumbledown (ABC TV)
- 13 November – (United States) Mickey's 60th Birthday (Seven Network)
- 15 November – (United States) Crazy Like a Fox (Network Ten)
- 20 November – (United States) I Married Dora (Network Ten)
- 21 November – (New Zealand) Steel Riders (Network Ten)
- 22 November – (United Kingdom) Hannay (ABC TV)
- 23 November – (United States) Outlaws (Nine Network)
- 24 November – (United Kingdom) Prospects (ABC TV)
- 24 November – (United States) J.J. Starbuck (Nine Network)
- 24 November – (United States) Women in Prison (Nine Network)
- 28 November – (United Kingdom) Your Mother Wouldn't Like It (ABC TV)
- 28 November – (United States) The Highwayman (Network Ten)
- 29 November – (United States) The Slap Maxwell Story (Seven Network)
- 1 December – (United States) The Law & Harry McGraw (Network Ten)
- 1 December – (United Kingdom) King and Castle (ABC TV)
- 3 December – (United Kingdom) The Old Men at the Zoo (ABC TV)
- 3 December – (Italy) / (France) / (Spain) / (Switzerland) / (United Kingdom) / (West Germany) Quo Vadis? (ABC TV)
- 4 December – (France) / (Italy) / (Canada) / (Socialist Federal Republic of Yugoslavia) Race for the Bomb (ABC TV)
- 5 December – (United Kingdom) C.A.B. (Network Ten)
- 5 December – (United States) The New Gidget (Network Ten)
- 16 December – (Canada) The Body Electric (ABC TV)
- 19 December – (United Kingdom) The Ghosts of Motley Hall (ABC TV)
- 21 December – (United States) Jack and Mike (Network Ten)
- 24 December – (United States) Christmas Everyday (ABC TV)
- 25 December – (United Kingdom) / (Wales) Fox Tales (ABC TV)
- 26 December – (United Kingdom) The December Rose (ABC TV)
- 30 December – (United Kingdom) Clarence (ABC TV)
- 31 December – (West Germany) / (Italy) / (France) Treasure Island in Outer Space (ABC TV)
- (United Kingdom) Creepy Crawlies (SBS TV)
- (United Kingdom) Playbox (Nine Network)
- (United States) Pursuit of Happiness (Unknown)

== Changes to network affiliation ==
This is a list of programs which made their premiere on an Australian television network that had previously premiered on another Australian television network. The networks involved in the switch of allegiances are predominantly both free-to-air networks or both subscription television networks. Programs that have their free-to-air/subscription television premiere, after previously premiering on the opposite platform (free-to air to subscription/subscription to free-to air) are not included. In some cases, programs may still air on the original television network. This occurs predominantly with programs shared between subscription television networks.

=== International ===
| Program | New network(s) | Previous network(s) | Date |
|---|---|---|---|
| (United Kingdom) It Ain't Half Hot Mum | Seven Network | ABC TV | 23 February |
| (France) / (Japan) Zoom the White Dolphin | SBS TV | ABC TV | 13 July |
| (Sweden) Who Will Comfort Toffle? | ABC TV | SBS TV | 29 August |
| (United States) Murder She Wrote | Network Ten | Nine Network | 29 December |

== Television shows ==
=== 1950s ===
- Mr. Squiggle and Friends (1959–1999)

=== 1960s ===
- Four Corners (1961–present)

=== 1970s ===
- Hey Hey It's Saturday (1971–1999, 2009–2010)
- Young Talent Time (1971–1988)
- 60 Minutes (1979–present)

=== 1980s ===
- Sale of the Century (1980–2001)
- Wheel of Fortune (1981–1996, 1996–2003, 2004–present)
- Sunday (1981–2008)
- Today (1982–present)
- Neighbours (1985–present)
- The Flying Doctors (1986–1993)
- Rage (1987–present)
- Home and Away (1988–present)
- The Comedy Company (1988–1990)
- Seven's Super Saturday (1988–1990)

== Ending this year ==
| Date | Show | Channel | Debut |
|---|---|---|---|
| 17 March 1988 | c/o The Bartons | ABC TV | 29 February 1988 |
| 14 April 1988 | The Dirtwater Dynasty | Network Ten | 10 April 1988 |
| 1 May 1988 | Touch the Sun | ABC TV | 27 March 1988 |
| 3 August 1988 | The Gerry Connolly Show | ABC TV | 29 June 1988 |
| 15 November 1988 | Emma: Queen of the South Seas | Channel Ten | 14 November 1988 |
| December 1988 | Romper Room | Channel Seven/NBN Television | 1963 |
| 1 December 1988 | Young Talent Time | Channel Ten | 24 April 1971 |
| 13 December 1988 | The Last Resort | ABC TV | 27 April 1988 |
| 18 December 1988 | House Rules | ABC TV | 10 July 1988 |
| 23 December 1988 | Good Morning Melbourne | Channel Ten | 1981 |

== See also ==
- 1988 in Australia
- List of Australian films of 1988
