= 1990 in Australia =

- Monarch: Elizabeth II
- Governor-General: Bill Hayden
- Prime minister: Bob Hawke
- Population: 17,065,128
- Elections: Federal, NT

The following lists events that happened during 1990 in Australia.

- Decades: 1970s; 1980s; 1990s; 2000s; 2010s
- See also: 1990 in Australian television; 1990 in Australian literature; Other events of 1990; Federal election; Timeline of Australian history

== Incumbents ==
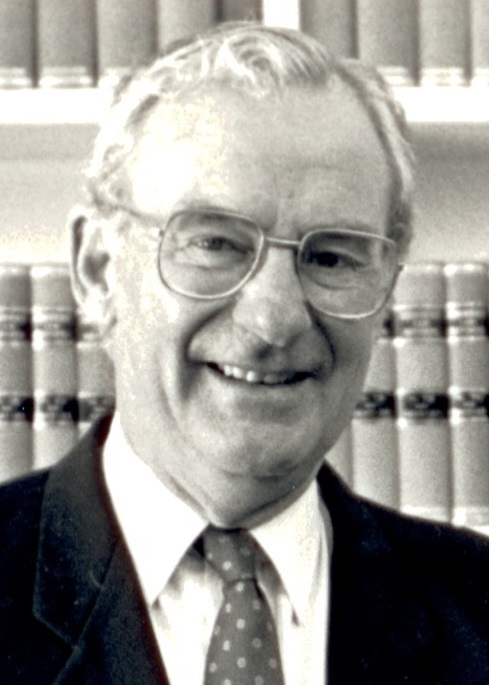
Bill Hayden

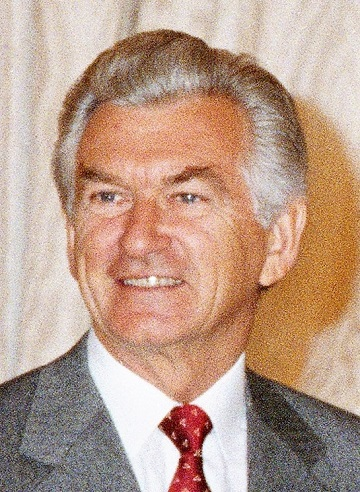
Bob Hawke

- Monarch – Elizabeth II
- Governor-General – Bill Hayden
- Prime Minister – Bob Hawke
  - Deputy Prime Minister – Lionel Bowen (until 4 April), then Paul Keating
  - Opposition Leader – Andrew Peacock (until 3 April), then John Hewson
- Chief Justice – Sir Anthony Mason

=== State and territory leaders ===
- Premier of New South Wales – Nick Greiner
  - Opposition Leader – Bob Carr
- Premier of Queensland – Wayne Goss
  - Opposition Leader – Russell Cooper
- Premier of South Australia – John Bannon
  - Opposition Leader – John Olsen (until 12 January), then Dale Baker
- Premier of Tasmania – Michael Field
  - Opposition Leader – Robin Gray
- Premier of Victoria – John Cain Jr. (until 10 August), then Joan Kirner
  - Opposition Leader – Alan Brown
- Premier of Western Australia – Peter Dowding (until 12 February), then Carmen Lawrence
  - Opposition Leader – Barry MacKinnon
- Chief Minister of the Australian Capital Territory – Trevor Kaine
  - Opposition Leader – Rosemary Follett
- Chief Minister of the Northern Territory – Marshall Perron
  - Opposition Leader – Terry Smith (until 1 November), then Brian Ede
- President of the Legislative Assembly of Norfolk Island – David Buffett

=== Governors and administrators ===
- Governor of New South Wales – Sir David Martin (until 7 August), then Peter Sinclair
- Governor of Queensland – Sir Walter Campbell
- Governor of South Australia – Sir Donald Dunstan
- Governor of Tasmania – Sir Phillip Bennett
- Governor of Victoria – Davis McCaughey
- Governor of Western Australia – Sir Francis Burt (from 29 March)
- Administrator of Norfolk Island – Herbert MacDonald
- Administrator of the Northern Territory – James Muirhead

== Events ==
=== January ===
- 2 January – A battle by the major creditors to the Bond Group of companies to gain control of the best assets begins in the Supreme Court of Victoria.
- 3 January – Prime Minister Bob Hawke and New South Wales Premier Nick Greiner meet to discuss the reconstruction of Newcastle.
- 16 January – Andrew Peacock launches the Federal Opposition's Family Action Plan.
- 17 January –
  - Prime Minister Bob Hawke is heckled by pilots while on the campaign trail.
  - The National Australia Bank buys out Britain's Yorkshire Bank.
- 18 January –
  - Supreme Court of Victoria grants Alan Bond permission to sell an oilfield to raise cash.
  - A fateful outback trip in scorching conditions claims the lives of seven Aboriginal people from the Punmu community in the Great Sandy Desert.
- 19 January – A fire breaks out in the historic Wool Store building in Brisbane.
  - A man is charged over an alleged plan to fire-bomb Parliament in Canberra.
  - Queensland Premier Wayne Goss announces an independent inquiry into the logging industry on Fraser Island.
- 22 January –
  - Tram dispute talks break down in Melbourne.
  - A gas leak causes the evacuation of a Melbourne building.
- 23 January – The industrial tram dispute continues as 250 trams blockade the city of Melbourne.
- 24 January –
  - An Australian is shot dead in Bougainville.
  - A fireworks explosion occurs at an amusement park on the New South Wales Central Coast.
- 25 January –
  - Opposition health spokesman Peter Shack embarrassingly fails to produce the Coalition's long-promised health insurance policy. The Federal Opposition abandons its Medicare policy in what critics regarded as an embarrassing turnaround.
  - The International Olympic Committee President arrives in Melbourne, giving a massive boost to Melbourne's Olympic Games bid.
- 26 January – Allan Border is honoured in the Australia Day Honours.
- 27 January – A riot breaks out at a Brisbane jail.
- 28 January –
  - Prime Minister Bob Hawke pledges millions for a new Melbourne sports stadium.
  - Police arrest a man in Melbourne alleged to be the infamous loaded note bandit.
- 30 January – An inquiry into the Grafton bus crash begins.
- 31 January – A freak storm tears a path of destruction across Mount Isa, Queensland.

=== February ===
- 2 February – Cyclone Nancy hits the town of Maryborough in Queensland.
- 7 February – Commonwealth Games athletes are welcomed home with a parade through the city streets of Melbourne.
- 8 February – An oil slick pollutes Victoria's Ninety Mile Beach.
- 12 February – Carmen Lawrence becomes the premier of Western Australia, and Australia's first female premier, after the resignation of Peter Dowding.
- 14 February –
  - A report is released which condemns the police rescue effort during the Newcastle earthquake.
  - Austin Lewis is removed from the shadow frontbench for declaring that Andrew Peacock was "gone" if they lost the next election.
- 15 February – The Reserve Bank of Australia cuts official interest rates by half a percent – a move which Federal Opposition MP John Hewson described as "blatantly playing politics".
- 16 February – Prime Minister Bob Hawke announces a 24 March election date.
- 25 February – A televised debate between Prime Minister Bob Hawke and Opposition Leader Andrew Peacock reinforces Bob Hawke's position.
- 28 February – Bob Carr moves to suspend Standing Orders in New South Wales Legislative Assembly to move a motion to condemn National Party Leader and Deputy Premier Wal Murray for allegedly interfering with proper tendering procedures in respect of the Walsh Bay redevelopment.

=== March ===
- 5 March –
  - Queensland State Cabinet gives Commission of Inquiry status to the investigation which Mr Tony Fitzgerald, QC, will conduct into the future management and conservation of Fraser Island.
  - Federal Opposition Leader, Andrew Peacock, launches the Liberal Party's policy for the upcoming Federal Election.
- 6 March – The New South Wales Auditor-General clears the New South Wales Rail Chief, Sayers, of any wrongdoing.
- 7 March – The New South Wales Government launches its "Statecare" environmental policies on the same day that an oil slick is washed up on three Sydney beaches.
- 9 March –
  - A "sombre, serious and responsible" Labor campaign is launched in Brisbane, 4 days after the Liberal Party's glitzy launch.
  - Bushfires burn in the Adelaide Hills.
- 11 March –
  - The Queensland Government introduces new heritage laws to protect heritage buildings from demolition by developers.
  - Criminal Abe Saffron is released from prison.
- 18 March – Andrew Peacock is interviewed by Laurie Oakes on the television program Sunday, regarding his stance on the Multifunction Polis (MFP), a proposal to build a Japanese funded technology city in Australia. Peacock attacks the MFP concept, saying it would become an Asian "enclave".
- 19 March –
  - The Australian newspaper runs a headline titled Peacock a 'danger in the Lodge'.' for Andrew Peacock] opposition to the Multifunction Polis (MFP).
  - Cyclone Ivor batters the Queensland coast.
  - Wild storms hit Sydney.
  - The Royal Commission into Black Deaths in Custody is to focus on police in a new inquiry.
- 20 March –
  - Serial killer John Wayne Glover is arrested for a series of "Granny Murders" on Sydney's North Shore.
- 21 March –
  - Allegations are revealed that a Minister misled New South Wales Parliament over North Coast land deals.
  - Alan Bond sells off his brewing interests and Bond Media to Bell Resources.
- 22 March – Prime Minister Bob Hawke admits that Australia is in the first stages of recession.
- 23 March-
  - A bushfire sweeps through the Adelaide Hills.
  - Police conduct a drug raid on the Heidelberg Hotel, angering civil libertarian groups.
  - Aboriginal groups accuse Charles Perkins of joining in an attack on land rights by the New South Wales Government.
  - The Law Reform (Decriminalisation of Sodomy) Act 1989, decriminalising private sexual acts between two people of the same sex in Western Australia, goes into effect.
- 24 March – A federal election is held. The government of Prime Minister Bob Hawke is re-elected for a fourth term with its lowest primary vote ever – 39.4% and the loss of 8 seats. Australian Democrats Leader Janine Haines fails in her bid for the South Australian Lower House seat of Kingston, and National leader Charles Blunt loses his northern New South Wales seat of Richmond, largely on anti-nuclear Helen Caldicott's preferences. In North Sydney, popular ex-mayor Ted Mack becomes the first genuine Independent to win a House seat since World War II. The number of Australian Democrats Senators increases to 8.
- 25 March – A bomb and poison attack is instigated against an Adelaide poultry processing plant.
- 26 March – Finance Minister Senator Peter Walsh makes unflattering remarks about poll-driven policies having undermined the careful work of Cabinet's Economic Review Committee and declines to stay in the Ministry.

=== April ===
- 3 April –
  - The Liberal Party of Australia leadership spill, 1990 takes place, with Dr. John Hewson being elected as Leader, and Peter Reith as Deputy Leader of the Federal Liberal Party.
  - The fourth Hawke ministry is announced – Treasurer Paul Keating replaces the retired Lionel Bowen as deputy prime minister, Senator Graham Richardson transfers from the Environment portfolio to Social Security and the centre left faction loses out in the extensive reshuffle.
  - The South Australian Government releases its final report on the murder of George Duncan finding that there was insufficient evidence to charge any person with the murder which took place on 10 May 1972.
- 11 April – Tim Fischer unexpectedly beats John Sharp for the leadership of the National Party of Australia. He pledges to restore his party's traditional base in rural and provincial Australia.

=== May ===
- The 80 Series Toyota Land Cruiser goes on sale in Australia for the first time. It is considered to be the greatest 4WD ever built.
- 6 May – Six people die in the Cowan rail accident, when a CityRail Interurban train collides with a 3801 Limited steam locomotive on the banks of the Hawkesbury River in New South Wales.
- 14 May – A bitter public row between Paul Keating and John Button over tariff policy leads critics to cast further doubt on Prime Minister Bob Hawke's ability to discipline his ministers.
- 21 May – The Federal Government rejects calls from the New South Wales Government for a Royal Commission into the Mafia and its alleged links to the assassination of Police Chief Colin Winchester.
- 27 May – Mistaking them for two off duty British soldiers, the Provisional Irish Republican Army kill Australian tourists Nick Spanos and Stephen Melrose in the southern Dutch town of Roermond.

=== June ===
- 8 June – Two major Queensland firms involved in the building industry collapse, costing hundreds of jobs and leaving projects worth millions of dollars in jeopardy.
- 10 June – The Federal Health Minister announces that Medicare is to be overhauled for the first time in its six-year history to produce a better targeted, more efficient system with a stronger emphasis on community care and preventative programs.
- 15 June –
  - The Federal Government admits it can't stop Indonesia giving aid to thousands of Cambodians heading to Australia, renewing fears of an influx of boat people.
  - Hundreds of Aborigines and their supporters march to New South Wales Parliament House to demonstrate against a plan to replace the New South Wales Aboriginal Land Council.
- 16 June – Queensland Premier Wayne Goss announces that virgin forests on Fraser Island will be protected under a historic agreement between conservationists and the timber industry.
- 19 June –
  - Solomon Lew's luxury cruiser "Voyage Solo" erupts into flames at North Wharf.
  - Tasmanian Labor Party Senator Terry Aulich is cleared of an assault charge.
- 20 June –
  - The Victorian Government is humiliated following the downgrading of the State's credit rating by Moody Investor Services.
  - The first legal brothel opens in Melbourne's Central Business District.
- 22 June –
  - A jury finds 24-year-old Stephen Jamieson, 18-year-old man Matthew Elliot and a 17-year-old boy (later identified as Bronson Blessington) guilty of the rape and murder of 20-year-old bank teller Janine Balding on 8 September 1988.
  - Violence erupts on a Leighton Contractors building site in Melbourne as mounted police use batons to force a passage through a picket line for vehicles carrying contractors onto the site.
- 24 June – The Victorian Government orders the closure of the Farrow Corporation building societies Pyramid, Geelong and Countrywide.
- 28 June – The Premiers' Conference takes place and Prime Minister Bob Hawke outlines his vision of a new co-operative federalism for Australia for the 21st century.

=== July ===
- 10 July – Bob Hawke becomes Australia's second-longest-serving prime minister (after Robert Menzies).
- 19 July – Prime Minister Bob Hawke announces that the Commonwealth will work with the States to achieve effective supervision of deposit-taking, non-bank institutions.
- 20 July –
  - Prime Minister Bob Hawke announces that some public service jobs would be cut under reforms to eliminate Commonwealth-State duplication.
  - New South Wales Education and Youth Affairs Minister, Dr Terry Metherell, resigns from his ministry after revealing he faces tax charges.

=== August ===
- 2 August – Former South Australian premier Don Dunstan attacks Prime Minister Bob Hawke over his apparent reversal in Government policy on Fiji's new constitution.
- 7 August – John Cain resigns as Premier of Victoria over a series of financial scandals, and is replaced by the first female premier of Victoria, Joan Kirner.
- 10 August –
  - The State Bank of Victoria is sold to the Commonwealth Bank for AU$1.6b, in the wake of bad debts run up by the State Bank's Tricontinental subsidiary in the 1980s.
  - Prime Minister Bob Hawke announces that Australia will send two frigates to join the naval blockade of Iraq in the Gulf War which followed Iraq's annexation of Kuwait. Protests ensued.
- 21 August – Measures announced in the Federal Budget – an assets test on family allowances, the cutting of pharmaceutical benefits and taxes on imputed pensioner income from investments – all provoke community outcry.

=== September ===
- 1 September – Liberal candidate Tony Packard wins the Hills by-election in New South Wales.
- 5 September – The Queensland Government hands down its first budget under Premier Wayne Goss, which sets out a plan for increased spending on education, the police, aged care and the environment.
- 9 September – New South Wales Premier Nick Greiner announces a ban on beachfront high-rise developments and says his State "is no place for the Queensland white-shoe brigade".
- 14 September – Following the blockading of Parliament House, Canberra by hundreds of logging rigs, Federal Cabinet agrees to interim logging in 15 National Estate areas.
- 16 September – Meeting in Perth 30 representatives of a range of gay, lesbian, bisexual and transsexual organisations agree to form the Pride Collective (WA).
- 18 September – Melbourne loses its bid to host the 1996 Olympic Games to the American city of Atlanta.
- 24 September – A special Australian Labor Party Conference endorses the privatisation of Qantas and Australian Airlines, the merger of OTC and Telecom and the sale of Aussat, despite the misgivings of the Left faction.

=== October ===
- 1 October – The Tasmanian Greens terminate the Labor–Green Accord after Tasmania adopts the federal government's Forests and Forest Industry Strategy.
- 2 October – Opera singer Dame Joan Sutherland announces her retirement.
- 5 October – After one hundred and fifty years, ten months and two days, The Herald broadsheet newspaper in Melbourne is published for the last time as a separate newspaper. Founded in 1840 as The Port Phillip Herald, it is merged with its morning tabloid sister paper The Sun News-Pictorial and the first issue of the new Herald-Sun, described by owner Rupert Murdoch as "the world's first 24-hour newspaper", with morning and afternoon editions, is published on 8 October. On the same day, the 49-year-old afternoon tabloid The Daily Mirror in Sydney is published for the last time as a separate newspaper. The Daily Mirror is merged with its morning sister paper The Daily Telegraph and the first edition of The Daily Telegraph-Mirror also appears on 8 October.
- 8 October – Federal Cabinet endorses logging in 40% of the disputed New South Wales south-eastern forests, to the dismay of environmentalists.
- 27 October – A general election is held in the Northern Territory. The Country Liberal Party government of Marshall Perron is returned to power.
- 29 October – Prime Minister Bob Hawke makes an announcement promising the States more access to Government revenue.
- 30 October – A special Premiers' Conference is held in Brisbane. State Premiers agree with the Commonwealth to streamline transport rules under an historic agreement providing for national registration and licensing.

=== November ===
- 1 November – The Australian domestic aviation market is deregulated.
- 12 November – Prime Minister Bob Hawke announces that the risk of war in the Persian Gulf had increased as two more Australian guided missile vessels left for the Gulf.
- 14 November – Former Queensland Health Minister Leisha Harvey is sentenced to twelve months in jail after being found guilty of thirteen counts of misappropriating public money.
- 16 November – Prime Minister Bob Hawke and Queensland Premier Wayne Goss announce that the Federal and State Governments will provide $11 million to manage the 621,566 hectares of rainforest between Townsville and Cooktown.
- 21 November – The Queensland state caucus amends the Criminal Code and the Criminal Law (Sexual Offences) Act 1978–1989 to decriminalise consensual sexual activity between adult males in private.
- 29 November – Federal Treasurer Paul Keating announces that Australia is experiencing an economic recession.

=== December ===
- 7 December – Paul Keating remarks at a Press Gallery dinner that Australia has never had a strong leader. He is forced to make a public apology to Prime Minister Bob Hawke on 10 December.
- 11 December – Media company Fairfax is placed in receivership.
- 12 December – Prime Minister Bob Hawke publicly states that skilled journalists are more important than diverse media ownership to the media's crucial democratic role.
- 29 December – Five men, aged between 41 and 80, are killed in a fire at the Oakdale Guest House in Ipswich, Queensland. Although a man is charged in 1992 with arson and murder, the charges are eventually dropped. Upon the fire's 17th anniversary in 2007, the investigation into the fire is reopened. In October 2024, it's announced that a $500,000 reward is being offered for information about the fire.

== Arts and literature ==
- Tom Flood's novel Oceana Fine wins the Miles Franklin Award

== Film ==
- 20 September – The Big Steal is released. Directed by Nadia Tass, the film will go on to be nominated for nine AFI awards, of which it will win three.
- Blood Oath

== Television ==
- July – Kerry Packer purchases back control of the Nine Network for A$250 million from Alan Bond, who purchased it from him for $1 billion in 1987.
- 14 September – Westpac puts Network Ten into receivership.
- 27 December – WIN Television purchases Star Television just three days before Queensland is due to be aggregated, giving them the Nine Network affiliation and leaving QTV, who were going to take the Nine affiliation, with the Network Ten affiliation.
- 31 December – The Queensland regional television market is aggregated, with Sunshine Television Network (now Seven Queensland) taking a Seven affiliation, WIN Television taking a Nine affiliation, and QTV with the Ten affiliation.
- The Seven Network is placed in receivership.

== Sport ==
- 1 January – The VFL is renamed as the AFL (Australian Football League).
- 22 January – John McEnroe is thrown out of the Australian Open Tennis Championships.
- 27 January – Steffi Gras wins the Australian Open Tennis Championship.
  - Hayley Lewis wins her fourth gold medal at the Auckland Commonwealth Games.
- 28 January – Lisa Curry wins a gold medal at the Auckland Commonwealth Games.
- 30 March – First day of the Australian Track & Field Championships for the 1989–1990 season, which are held at the Olympic Park in Melbourne. The men's 10,000 metres event was conducted at Canberra on 24 February 1990.
- 22 May – New South Wales (13.8.86) upsets Victoria (10.16.76) in a State of Origin match at the SCG.
- 22 July – Allan Carman wins the men's national marathon title, clocking 2:15:17 in Brisbane, while Trudy Fenton claims the women's title in 2:44:38.
- 23 July – Players' draft adopted at board meeting of NSWRL.
- 8 September – Collingwood draws its qualifying final with the West Coast Eagles. The AFL finals schedule is thrown into chaos and the Grand Final is rescheduled to be played a week later than usual. Extra time is subsequently introduced for future finals matches.
- 23 September – Canberra Raiders defeat Penrith Panthers 18–14 to win the 83rd NSWRL premiership, their second straight. Raiders halfback Ricky Stuart is awarded the Clive Churchill medal for man of the match. South Sydney Rabbitohs finish in last position, claiming the wooden spoon.
- 6 October – Collingwood (13.11.89) defeats Essendon (5.11.41) to win the 94th VFL/AFL premiership. It is the first premiership won under the AFL banner and Collingwood's first premiership since 1958, thereby symbolising the end of the "Colliwobbles".
- 10 November – Mal Meninga scores a stunning last-minute try to win the second Ashes rugby league test at Old Trafford.

== Births ==
- 2 January – Chris Sabburg, cricketer
- 8 January – Scott Pye, racing driver
- 10 January – Cody Walker, rugby league player
- 13 January – Liam Hemsworth, actor
- 20 January – Ray Thompson, rugby league player
- 30 January
  - Andrew McCullough, rugby league player
  - Mitchell Starc, cricketer
- 4 February – Jake Friend, rugby league player
- 8 February – Daniel Vidot, Australian-Samoan rugby league player
- 24 March
  - Keisha Castle-Hughes, Australian-born New Zealand actress
  - Alyssa Healy, cricketer
- 5 April – Patrick Dangerfield, Australian rules footballer
- 7 April – Trent Cotchin, Australian rules footballer
- 10 April – Ricky Leutele, Australian-Samoan rugby league player
- 26 April –Carla Krizanic, lawn bowler
- 1 May – Caitlin Stasey, actress
- 2 May – Daria Joura, artistic gymnast
- 4 May – Nic Naitanui, Australian rules footballer
- 10 May – Josh Dugan, rugby league player
- 22 May – Wyatt Roy, politician
- 7 June
  - Iggy Azalea, rapper
  - Daniel Rich, Australian rules footballer
- 29 June – Aaron Stonehouse, politician
- 2 July – Margot Robbie, actress
- 3 July – Nathan Gardner, Rugby league player
- 6 July – Jamal Idris, rugby league player
- 20 July – Samantha Harris, model
- 24 July – Travis Mahoney, Olympic swimmer
- 27 July – Indiana Evans, actress
- 25 August – Chloe Sims, gymnast
- 1 September – Shona Morgan, gymnast
- 12 September – Hollie Dykes, gymnast
- 15 September – Aaron Mooy, soccer player
- 12 October – Olivia Wright, diver
- 23 October – Stan Walker, singer
- 30 October – Melody Hernandez, artistic gymnast
- 12 November – Peter Mata'utia, Australian-Samoan rugby league player
- 27 November – Natasha Scott, lawn bowler
- 9 December – Ashleigh Brewer, actress

== Deaths ==
- 4 January – Henry Bolte (born 1908), Premier of Victoria
- 9 January – Sir Edward McTiernan (born 1892), High Court judge and politician
- 15 January – Dame Peggy van Praagh (born 1910), ballet dancer
- 8 February – Sir Ernie Titterton (born 1916), nuclear physicist
- 14 February – Graeme Hole (born 1931), cricketer
- 10 March – Pat McDonald (born 1922), actress (Number 96, Sons & Daughters)
- 10 March – Sir Reg Wright (born 1905), Tasmanian Liberal senator
- 2 April – Ted Hook (born 1910), public servant
- 15 April – William Hart-Smith (born 1911), poet
- 5 May – Gordon Mackie (born 1912), NSW politician
- 3 May – Jock Austin (born 1938), Indigenous Australian community leader
- 8 June – Herbie Matthews (born 1913), Australian rules footballer and South Melbourne coach
- 21 June – Martin Johnston (born 1947), poet
- 25 June – Peggy Glanville-Hicks (born 1912), composer
- 1 July – Albert Field (born 1910), Queensland senator
- 15 August – Jimmy Carruthers (born 1929), boxer
- 17 August – Sir David Martin (born 1933), Governor of New South Wales
- 19 August – Jim Cavanagh (born 1913), ALP politician
- 2 September – Robert Holmes à Court (born 1937), businessman
- 26 September – Sir James Forrest (born 1905), lawyer
- 30 September – Patrick White (born 1912), author
- 14 October – Clifton Pugh (born 1924), artist
- 8 November – Helen Cutler (born 1923), charity worker and patron
- 25 December – John Stuart Anderson (born 1908), chemist

== See also ==
- 1990 in Australian television
- List of Australian films of 1990
