= Wendy Cracked a Walnut =

1990 Australian movie

- Directed by: Michael Pattinson
- Written by: Suzanne Hawley
- Starring: Rosanna Arquette; Bruce Spence
- Cinematography: Jeffrey Malouf
- Edited by: Michael Honey
- Music by: Bruce Smeaton
- Production companies: Rosen, Harper Mortlock Entertainment; Classic Films; Australian Broadcasting Corporation
- Release date: August 2, 1990
- Running time: 87 minutes
- Country: Australia
- Language: English
- Box office: A$43,074 (Australia)

Wendy Cracked a Walnut (also known as ...Almost) is a 1990 Australian romantic fantasy/comedy film directed by Michael Pattinson and starring Rosanna Arquette and Bruce Spence.

== Plot ==
Wendy is unhappy with her life and with her preoccupied husband, Ronnie. She reads Mills and Boon romantic novels and dreams of a new life featuring a dream lover, Jake.

== Cast ==
- Rosanna Arquette as Wendy
- Bruce Spence as Ronnie
- Hugo Weaving as Jake
- Kerry Walker as Deidre
- Doreen Warburton as Elsie
- Desiree Smith as Cynthia
- Susan Lyons as Caroline
- Betty Lucas as Mrs. Taggart
- Dennis Hoey as Sonny Taggart
- Douglas Hedge as Mr. Leveredge
- Barry Jenkins as Pierre
- Jan Adele as Majorie
- William McInnes as Ralph

== Production ==
It was the first theatrical film from the Australian Broadcasting Corporation.

== Reception ==
The film wasn't well received critically or commercially. David Stratton of Variety called it "limply executed" and "unconvincing". It grossed only A$43,074 in Australia.

It was released in the U.S. direct-to-video under the title ...Almost.
