= Savage Indictment =

1990 documentary film

- Directed by: Nicholas Adler; Caroline Sherwood
- Produced by: Nicholas Adler; Caroline Sherwood
- Release date: 1990
- Running time: 51 minutes
- Country: Australia
- Language: English

Savage Indictment is a 1990 British/Australian documentary film created by Nicholas Adler and Caroline Sherwood. It looks at Australia's policy of assimilating the countries Aboriginal People. It largely focussed on the story of James Savage (born Russell Moore), who was taken from his family when he was four days old and was sentenced to death in the USA. It was described by Sean Day-Lewis of The Sunday Telegraph as "a film concerned to press the charge against white Australia of "cultural genocide"."
