= Steve Constanzo =

Australian basketball player

Steve Costanzo (born 22 January 1988 in Ingham, Queensland) is a former Australian professional basketball player who has played for the Townsville Heat in the Queensland Basketball League. At 18 years old, he earned himself a position at the Australian Institute of Sport. Costanzo played one game for the Townsville Crocodiles in the 2008–09 NBL season, before a foot injury forced him out for the rest of his career.
