= Jan Adele =

Australian actress and entertainer

- Born: Janice Adele; 14 April 1935; Melbourne, Victoria, Australia
- Died: 27 February 2000 (aged 64); Allawah, New South Wales, Australia
- Occupations: vaudevillian; circus performer; actress; singer; dancer
- Years active: c. 1938-1998

Janice Adele (14 April 1935 – 27 February 2000) better known as Jan Adele, was an Australian actress and entertainer with a career spanning over 50 years, in circus, vaudeville, theatre, television and film. She was best known for her role as showgirl Trixie O'Toole in the 1970s soap opera Number 96.

== Early life ==
Adele was a fourth-generation performer. Her grandfather Roy Kelroy had worked for Barnum and Bailey circus in America and her aunt Eilleen Pascoe Webb ran an elocution and dance school in Melbourne. Her mother, was known professionally as Eris O'Dell, worked for the Tivoli circuit and J.C. Williamson, as a singer, actress and dancer and also played piano, and was an assistant producer to Jack Davey at the Macquarie theatre radio and to Wallace Parnell at the Tivoli. Adele did not know her father.

Adele appeared in pantomime from the age of three at Mark Foy's. As a teenager she performed in the circus as an acrobat on the high wire, and as a contortionist. At the age of 19 she began a three-year stint entertaining US troops in Korea and Japan. In 1971 she was part of the New South Wales Concert Party, entertaining Australian troops in Vietnam. After this she performed steadily in vaudeville theatre and as a show girl.

== Career ==
=== Television ===
In the 1970s, Adele moved into television, with guest spots in the Crawford Productions police dramas Homicide and Division 4.

Subsequent to this, she was spotted by Number 96 producer, Bill Harmon, in a pantomime show from which he devised the recurring character of Trixie O'Toole – a warm and funny vaudevillian showgirl and nightclub entertainer who has been treading the boards for years – for her.

Some of the humour of her Number 96 character was built around Adele's 15 stone figure. When joining the series Adele happily signed the nudity clause present in all cast member's contracts, reasoning that she would never be called upon to strip. She was later horrified to learn she would need to appear semi-nude for a comedy sequence in the show, but went ahead with the scenes. She often shared scenes with co-stars Wendy Blacklock and Mike Dorsey.

In the late 1970s, Adele was a frequent comedy performer on The Mike Walsh Show. She was also a frequent guest on Good Morning Australia with Bert Newton. Later television guest credits included Bony (1992), Heartbreak High (1994), Home and Away and 42nd Street.

=== Film ===
Adele subsequently acted in several Australian films. These included High Tide (1987), for which she won a Best Supporting Actress Award from the Australian Film Institute, Daisy and Simon (1988), ...Almost (1990), Greenkeeping (1992), Fatal Bond (1992) and The Sum of Us (1994).

== Personal life ==
Adele was married at 17. Her second husband, actor Rick Marshall, was bisexual. Her third marriage was to musician David Anderson in 1962. Adele had two daughters, Mandy and Jody.

== Awards ==
Year	Work	Award	Category	Result
1977	Jan Adele	Mo Awards	Comedian of the Year	Won
1982	Jan Adele and Lucky Grills – Fun Follies	Mo Awards	Variety Show of the Year	Won
1987	High Tide	Australian Film Institute Awards	Best Actress in a Supporting Role	Won

== Filmography ==
=== Film ===
Year	Title	Role	Type
1976	Caddie	Daisy	Feature film
1981	Winter of Our Dreams	Woman	Feature film
1987	High Tide	Bet	Feature film
1988	Daisy and Simon (aka Where the Outback Ends)	Daisy	Feature film
1990	Wendy Cracked a Walnut (aka ...Almost)	Majorie	Feature film
1991	Fatal Bond	Mrs. Karvan	Feature film
1992	Greenkeeping	Doreen	Feature film
1994	The Sum of Us	Barmaid	Feature film

=== Television ===
Year	Title	Role	Type
1960	The Bobby Limb Show	Guest performer	
1960	The Joe Martin Show	Guest performer	
1969	In Melbourne Tonight	Guest performer	6 episodes
1969–1985	The Mike Walsh Show	Guest performer	
1971–1972	The Bob Rogers Show	Guest performer	
1973	Homicide		1 episode
1974	Division 4		1 episode
1974–1975	Number 96	Trixie O'Toole	63 episodes
1976	Mummy and Me		TV pilot
1978	Graham Kennedy's Blankety Blanks	Panelist	
1981	Personality Squares	Contestant	1 episode
1985	Blankety Blanks	Contestant	3 episodes
1987	Have a Go	Guest judge	6 episodes
1988	Rafferty's Rules	Mrs. Gunning	1 episode
1990	Home and Away	Helen Cody	2 episodes
1991	A Country Practice	Mrs. Howie	1 episode
1991	The Miraculous Mellops	Customer	2 episodes
1992	Bony	Mrs. Adele	1 episode
1994	Heartbreak High	Ruby	26 episodes

== Theatre ==
Year	Title	Role	Type
1975	The Seahorse		UNSW, Old Tote Parade Theatre, Sydney
1979	Fun Follies		Palais Royale, Newcastle, NSW tour with Vidette Productions
1981	Gypsy	Rose	Rockdale Town Hall, Sydney
1982	My Kind of Music	Singer	Her Majesty's Theatre, Sydney
1984	Better Known As Bee		Q Theatre, Penrith
1988	Variety for AIDS		Paddington-Woollahra RSL
1990	Barnum		His Majesty's Theatre, Perth with Western Australian Theatre Company
1991	Fabulous Follies	Dancer	Her Majesty's Theatre, Adelaide
1992	Alive, Alone, Adele	Creator / performer	Tilbury Hotel, Sydney, Queanbeyan School of Arts Cafe
1993	Nunsense 2		La Mama, Melbourne with Edgley International
1997	42nd Street	Maggie Jones	Theatre Royal, Hobart
