= In Brisbane Today =

In Brisbane Today was an early Australian television series, which aired in 1990 until 1992, on the Nine Network in Queensland only. It was hosted by Fiona McDonald and Steve Haddan.
