= Daisy and Simon =

1988 Australian film

- Directed by: Stasch Radwanksi
- Written by: Anthony Wheeler
- Starring: Sean Scully; Jan Adele
- Release date: 1988
- Country: Australia
- Language: English
- Box office: A$2,261 (Australia)

Daisy and Simon is a 1988 Australian film shot in Perth. It is also known as Where the Outback Ends.

It was first announced in 1983 as Daisy then in 1985 as The Distance with Michael York.

== Cast ==
- Sean Scully as Simon
- Jan Adele as Daisy
