= Silver Brumby (disambiguation) =

Silver Brumby is a collection of children's fiction books by Elyne Mitchell.

Silver Brumby may also refer to:

- The Silver Brumby (novel), the 1958 first novel in the series
- The Silver Brumby (film), a 1993 Australian film based on the books
- The Silver Brumby (TV series), a 1996–1998 Australian animated series based on the books
