= The Silver Brumby (novel) =

1958 novel for children by Elyne Mitchell

- Author: Elyne Mitchell
- Language: English
- Series: Silver Brumby
- Genre: Children's fiction
- Publisher: Hutchinson
- Publication date: 1958
- Publication place: Australia
- Media type: Print
- Pages: 191 pp
- Preceded by: Black Cockatoos Mean Snow
- Followed by: Silver Brumby's Daughter

The Silver Brumby is a 1958 novel for children by Australian author Elyne Mitchell. It was commended for the Children's Book of the Year Award: Older Readers in 1959.

== Story outline ==
The story follows the fortunes of a young stallion in a herd of brumbies in the Australian mountain country as he fights his way to the leadership of the herd.

== Critical reception ==
The reviewer in The Bulletin had a few reservations about the book: "One has some doubts about the way the horses talk in it – Mrs. Mitchell, with her essentially realistic approach, hasn't set up quite the right climate of fantasy where this could be acceptable – and, with one brumby-hunt following another and the stallions incessantly fighting, it is a bit repetitive: but against that Mrs. Mitchell does know her country and does know her brumbies".

== Adaptations ==
The novel was adapted for the film in 1993, with the title altered to The Silver Stallion for the US market. The film was directed by John Tatoulis, from a script by Mitchell, Jon Stephens, and Tatoulis, and featured Caroline Goodall and Russell Crowe.

The novel was also adapted as an animated television series in 1996, and was written by Judy Malmgren, Stephens, and Paul Williams, and featured Brett Climo, Rebecca Gibney and Rhys Muldoon in vocal roles.

== Awards ==
- 1959 – commended Children's Book of the Year Award: Older Readers

== See also ==
- 1958 in Australian literature
