= Brumby (disambiguation) =

A brumby is an Australian term for a feral horse.

Brumby may also refer to:

- Brumby (surname)
- Brumbies, a Canberra-based rugby union team competing in Super Rugby
- Brumby Engineering College
- Brumby's Bakeries, chain of retail bakeries
- USS Brumby (FF-1044)
- Subaru Brumby, the Australian-market name of the Subaru BRAT
- Brumby, Lincolnshire, former village

== See also ==
- Brumby shooting, feral horse eradication in Australia
- Silver Brumby (disambiguation)
