= Craig Saavedra =

American producer

- Born: November 2, 1963 (age 62); Los Angeles, California

Craig Michael Saavedra (born November 2, 1963, in Los Angeles, California) is an American film producer, director, and two time Tony Award-winning Broadway producer. He is married to cinematographer/director Joaquin Sedillo.

== Early life ==
Saavedra was raised in Thousand Oaks, California, along with his six siblings, among them cartoonist/illustrator Scott Saavedra (“Dr. Radium”) and KFI AM 640 radio personality Neil Saavedra (The Jesus Christ Show).

Shortly after graduating high school, Saavedra found employment at Universal Studios in Hollywood as a tour guide. In the evenings, he attended film courses at UCLA’s Extension program. It was through this program that he met a film executive who eventually hired him as a story analyst at producer Jerry Weintraub’s Weintraub Entertainment Group. Shortly thereafter, Saavedra left to become Director of Operations at Big Time Picture Company, a post-production and film editing facility on Los Angeles’ west side.

== Producer/Director ==
=== Pro FilmWorks / Becker FilmWorks Entertainment ===
At Big Time Picture Company, Saavedra met Gregg Hoffman from nearby PRO FilmWorks, and was recruited to join PRO as a development executive.

At PRO FilmWorks, Saavedra was promoted to Vice President of Production and soon was producing and/or supervising the production/development of numerous projects, including the films Scorchers (1991), Only You (1992).

In 1993, PRO FilmWorks changed its name to Becker FilmWorks Entertainment, reflecting its ties with Australian parent company Becker Group a.k.a. Becker Entertainment. Saavedra was promoted to President of the Los Angeles operations, and was instrumental in the production and development of such films as Gross Misconduct (1993), and Closer and Closer (1996),The Real Macaw (1998), At First Sight (1999), and the television series The Man from Snowy River (1993–96).

In 1997, Saavedra took on the director's role for the Becker FilmWorks Entertainment comedy-drama Rhapsody in Bloom, written by Eric Tuchman and released in early 1998. The film stars Penelope Ann Miller, Ron Silver, Craig Sheffer, and Caroline Goodall. Shortly after the release of Rhapsody in Bloom, Saavedra left Becker FilmWorks to focus on writing both motion picture and theatrical works.

=== Starry Night Entertainment ===
In 2004, Saavedra teamed with Michael Shulman, a recent Yale graduate and former child actor, including a role as a teenager in Rhapsody in Bloom, to form Starry Night Entertainment.

Saavedra produced and directed the comedy/drama Sherman's Way (2008), which won the Audience Award for Best Feature at the Cinequest Film Festival 2008, the Audience Award at the Newport International Film Festival and a Special Jury Award at the Jackson Hole Film Festival.

In 2009, Starry Night Entertainment moved into producing live theater, mounting the New York premiere of JT Rogers's White People, Off-Broadway at the Atlantic Theater Company's Stage 2.

Starry Night followed up White People the following year with Craig Wright (playwright)'s Mistakes Were Made featuring a tour-de-force performance by Michael Shannon at Barrow Street Theatre.

Starry Night Entertainment was part of the production group for the musical After Midnight, which opened at the Brooks Atkinson Theater on November 3, 2013. The revue, centered on the music of Duke Ellington, marked the first above-the-title producing credit on Broadway for Saavedra and Shulman. The play was a popular and critical success, earning numerous awards and nominations for cast and crew, including a Tony Award Best Musical nomination and a Drama Desk Award win for Outstanding Musical Revue for Starry Night Entertainment and the other producers.

Starry Night Entertainment also produced the play The Cripple of Inishmaan, starring Daniel Radcliffe, which opened on Broadway on April 20, 2014, at the Cort Theatre. The play was a popular and critical success, earning six Tony Award nominations for cast and crew, including a nomination for the producers for Tony Award for Best Revival of a Play.

In 2016, Saavedra and Shulman produced the Broadway revival of Christopher Hampton's Les Liaisons Dangereuses starring Liev Schreiber, which opened at the Booth Theatre on October 30 and ran through January 8, 2017.

October 21, 2018, saw the opening of Jez Butterworth's The Ferryman directed by Sam Mendes at the Bernard B. Jacobs Theatre. Saavedra was part of the producing team that brought the acclaimed UK National Theatre production set in rural Northern Ireland c. 1981 to Broadway. The production was nominated for nine Tony Awards, winning four including Best Direction of a Play for Mendes, and earning Saavedra his first Tony win for Best Play. The Ferryman also won Drama Desk Awards for Outstanding Play, Outstanding Featured Actor and Outstanding Director. It ran for 296 performances, and ended its limited-run engagement on July 7, 2019.

In 2020, Saavedra was among a group of producers who transferred the acclaimed London production of Ben Power's adaptation of Stefano Massini's The Lehman Trilogy to Broadway's Nederlander Theatre. Once again directed by Sam Mendes, the production began previews on March 7 but was shut down just prior to its scheduled March 26 opening due to the COVID-19 pandemic. The play reopened on October 15, 2021 with Ben Miles joining original cast-members Simon Russell Beale and Adam Godley. The Broadway production's final performance was on January 2, 2022, after extending its limited run two weeks. The play was nominated for seven Tony Awards, winning among others Best Play (Saavedra's second win), Best Actor (Beale), and Best Director (Mendes). The production also won Best Play awards from The Drama League and Outer Critics Circle.

After 15 years, Saavedra and Shulman dissolved Starry Night Entertainment, and Saavedra now produces under Saavedillo, Inc.

== Awards ==
- Tony Award for The Lehman Trilogy - Best Play 2021-2022 Broadway Season
- Tony Award for The Ferryman - Best Play 2018-2019 Broadway Season
- The Ferryman earned 11 major awards on 20 nominations, including 4 wins for production partners
- Tony Award Nomination for After Midnight
- Tony Award Nomination for The Cripple of Inishmaan
- Audience Award for Best Feature Sherman's Way - Cinequest Film Festival 2008
- Audience Award for Best Feature Sherman's Way - Newport International Film Festival 2008
- Audience Award for Best Feature Sherman's Way - Gaia Film Festival 2008
- Special Jury Award for Sherman's Way - Jackson Hole Film Festival 2008
- Addy Award for Heinz Commercial Midnight Snack - 2008
- Audience Award for Best Feature Rhapsody in Bloom - Sedona International Film Festival 1999
- Rhapsody in Bloom - Hollywood Film Festival 1999 Best Actress Penelope Ann Miller
