= List of Home and Away characters introduced in 2002 =

Home and Away is an Australian soap opera. It was first broadcast on the Seven Network on 17 January 1988. The following is a list of characters that first appeared in 2002 by order of first appearance. They were all introduced by the show's Series Producer Julie McGuaran. The 15th season of Home and Away began airing on the Seven Network on 14 January 2002. The first introduction of year was Sebastian Elmaloglou as Max Sutherland. Rhett Giles joined the cast as Paris Burnett in April. Laurie Foell arrived as Deputy Principal Angie Russell in September and was joined by her son Dylan (Brett Hicks-Maitland) in October.

== Max Sutherland ==
Max Sutherland
- Home and Away character
- Portrayed by: Sebastian Elmaloglou
- Duration: 2002–2004
- First appearance: Episode 3196; 21 January 2002
- Last appearance: Episode 3821; 1 September 2004
In-universe information
- Occupation: Student; Author
- Father: Pete Sutherland
- Mother: Mandy Sutherland
- Uncles: Rhys Sutherland
- First cousins: Dani Sutherland; Kirsty Sutherland; Laura DeGroot; Jade Sutherland
- Other relatives: Oliver Phillips

Max Sutherland, portrayed by Sebastian Elmaloglou, made his first appearance on 21 January 2002 and departed on 1 September 2004. Following guest appearances on various television serials including GP. Max was Elmaloglou's first ongoing role He told the serial's official website how he differed from his character. "He is nothing like me because he is accused for everything as he is very cheeky and I'm not like that". Around the time of his debut, Elmaloglou began watching repeats of Home and Away starring his sister, Rebekah who played Sophie Simpson. "It is so funny watching Rebekah because she looks completely different. I have been told that when I was a baby and we were out together as a family, people would go up to Bec and ask her if I was her baby, after she had the baby on the show".

Max arrives in Summer Bay with his father, Pete (Christopher Mayer) to stay with his uncle Rhys (Michael Beckley) and aunt Shelley (Paula Forrest). Max's stay with his relatives becomes permanent when Pete flees to Hong Kong to escape gambling debts. He struggles to adjust to his new life but quickly makes a friend in caravan park resident Colleen Smart (Lyn Collingwood). He is also often in trouble at school along with his cousin Kirsty (Christie Hayes). Max later helps Colleen write a book under the pen-name "Maxine Peterson". He is also the centre of a small love triangle with Tamara Simpson (Sophie Luck) and Caitlin (Bree Beadman), who both want him to dedicate the book to them but both disappear from his life. Max then finds Tasha Andrews (Isabel Lucas), a disoriented girl on the beach and quickly becomes friendly with her. Eloise Lennox (Suzanne McEachernn), a new student at Summer Bay High catches Max's eye but has a hard time getting to know her due to her overprotective parents. Eloise reveals she is dying of Leukaemia and Max helps her live out her final wishes. After a date, Eloise dies in Max's arms.

Max creates a memorial place for Eloise in an abandoned mineshaft, but it collapses when Rhys, Kirsty and Jade (Kate Garven) arrive to find him. They are all eventually rescued. When Rhys marries Beth Hunter (Clarissa House, following his divorce from Shelley, Max has to contend with her younger children, twins Henry (Tobi Atkins) and Matilda (Indiana Evans), who are frequently rude to the Sutherlands due to being uprooted from their boarding school. Max and Henry do not get along at first and do not see eye to eye. After Principal Barry Hyde (Ivar Kants) catches Henry holding Max in a headlock he sentences them to a boxing match which Henry wins after Max is distracted. Max and Henry both become friends in time. Max had a short attraction to Matilda but she rebuffs him. Following the collapse of the Sutherland family and Rhys reconciling with Shelley, Max begins to feel out of place in the bay and feels betrayed by Rhys and Shelley. In spite of being offered a home with his uncle and aunt in the city, Max decides to leave Summer Bay to attend boarding school.

For his portrayal of Max, Elmaloglou was nominated for "Best Young Actor" at the 2004 Inside Soap Awards. Channel 5 chose the 2003 season finale where Max and his family fall into a Mineshaft as one their best ever episodes. In 2017, Daniel Kilkelly of Digital Spy praised the character's plots, saying "He was one of the few soap kids who actually had some decent storylines, including love triangles, boxing showdowns, his girlfriend's untimely death, and even a shock mineshaft collapse. Blimey – and he was only there for less than three years!" Lucy Lather from Inside Soap criticised Max and Eloise's terminal illness plot for copying an earlier storyline featuring Blake Dean (Les Hill) and Meg Bowman (Cathy Godbold) "Come on, Home and Away - you can't just revamp old storylines."

== Paris Burnett ==
Paris Burnett
- Home and Away character
- Portrayed by: Rhett Giles
- Duration: 2002–2003
- First appearance: 29 April 2002
- Last appearance: 10 September 2003
- Introduced by: Julie McGuaran
In-universe information
- Occupation: Principal of Summer Bay High (2002–03)
- Brothers: Troy Burnett

Paris Burnett, played by Rhett Giles, made his first appearance on 29 April 2002. The character was introduced as a replacement headmaster for Summer Bay High, after Donald Fisher (Norman Coburn) is forced to step down following his arrest. Of the situation, Giles stated "It's kind of weird - the character is stepping into a role and bringing his own ideas into an established place. It's like an actor bringing new ideas to the show. Everyone is watching Paris, judging him and wondering, 'Exactly how do we handle this guy?'" Giles said taking over from Donald was a challenge, but Paris does not look on the negative side and believes in making the best of the situation. He also said Paris's work and personal sides are very different and he is able to switch from one to the other pretty quickly. The character's "hip demeanour" and "flashy" Mustang car surprises the students and staff, but teacher Sally Fletcher (Kate Ritchie) is initially unsure about his methods, but they soon establish "a good rapport".

Giles admitted that Sally takes her time as she works out what Paris is about. He also stated that Paris is a team player, telling Sarrah Le Marquand of TV Week: "He grabs everyone around him, picks them up and holds them up above him. He leads from behind. He's not about being top dog or anything." This aspect of his personality endears him to school administrator Irene Roberts (Lynne McGranger). Giles told Le Marquand that Irene is taken aback by Paris's age, but his arrival gives her more responsibility which she enjoys. Paris also manages to establish mutual respect between himself and Donald, a moment that Giles compared to "meeting the ex-boyfriend of your new girlfriend." Giles added that there is a part of his character that is afraid of not living up to expectations, but he does not close himself off to new opportunities. He departed on 10 September 2003. Giles previously appeared on All Saints, which is filmed in a neighbouring studio at Seven Network, and he returned there after finishing his stint in Home and Away.

Paris arrives to take over as principal of Summer Bay High from Donald Fisher (Norman Coburn) who has been suspended during a departmental plot to close the school. Paris meets Irene Roberts (Lynne McGranger) and both are immediately attracted to each other but deny it. When they both attend Noah Lawson (Beau Brady) and Hayley Smith's (Bec Cartwright) flat-painting party, Both Irene and Paris discover they have a great deal in common including losing previous partners.

Paris is able to save the school after Donald is given some incriminating information about the department's incompetence from Brett Egan (Emmanuel Marshall). He grows closer to Irene and at the end of a date, he wants to kiss her but backs out. Donald is reinstated and Irene decides she cannot be with Paris as he is going to leave and both find it difficult to be around one another. They both attend the Summer Bay 150th anniversary dinner on board the Mirgini, but end up caught in a storm and are shipwrecked on an island where they share a kiss. After being rescued, they begin a relationship but Irene's foster son Nick Smith (Chris Egan) disapproves and feels Paris is too young for Irene. Paris is later offered a job in Orange, but agrees to return and he and Irene share a fond farewell.

Paris returns several months later to take over from Donald, following his retirement. Angie Russell (Laurie Foell) is annoyed as she thought she would be in line for promotion. Irene is reluctant to resume things but Paris works hard to convince her to do so and they reunite and Paris moves into the Beach House. Nick's behaviour is hard to contend with and he moves out again. He and Irene get back together after she is diagnosed with depression. However, this is short-lived as Paris receives a phone call telling him his brother and sister-in-law have been killed in a car crash and he has to return to the city to care for his orphaned niece and nephew. He asks Irene to join him but she tells him she cannot leave the bay. They share a sad goodbye and one final kiss before Paris leaves town.

== Angie Russell ==
Angela "Angie" Russell, played by Laurie Foell. She made her first screen appearance during the episode broadcast on 26 September 2002 and departed on 21 March 2003, but her character subsequently appeared as a ghost in her daughter's dreams on 24 May 2004. The revelation of Angie's killer and the aftermath raised audience figures in Australia to 1.5 million viewers, beating the Nine Network's Big Brother. A writer for What's on TV included Angie on their list of "The 50 most evil soap villains of all time". The writer stated "Actress Laurie Foell caused chaos not once but TWICE in Home and Away as evil Angela Russell and, later, as Angie's twisted cousin Josie." A writer from the Sunday Mercury described Angie as a "crackpot" and opined that the serial should "take lessons from British soaps about how to milk storylines", before adding "They won't be dragging this one out for months, as the killer confesses next week!"

== Dylan Russell ==
Dylan Russell
- Home and Away character
- Portrayed by: Brett Hicks-Maitland
- Duration: 2002–2004
- First appearance: Episode 3382; 8 October 2002
- Last appearance: Episode 3803; 11 August 2004
- Introduced by: Julie McGuaran
- Spin-off appearances: Home and Away: Secrets and the City (2002)
In-universe information
- Occupation: Student
- Mother: Angie Russell
- Half-sisters: Tasha Andrews
- Grandmothers: Monica Markham
- Nieces: Ella Hunter
- Other relatives: Josie Russell

Dylan Russell, played by Brett Hicks-Maitland, made his first appearance on 8 October 2002 and departed in 2003. He returned for several episodes in 2004. Adelaide-born Hicks-Maitland, a graduate of NIDA, relocated to Sydney to secure acting work. Producers were impressed and offered him a longer stint in the role of Dylan. Several years after leaving the serial, Maitland-Hicks was still being recognized as Dylan.

On the serial's official website Hicks-Maitland described his character "as 17 year old with the maturity of a 19 year old and the looks of a 20 year old, but, having said that, he is still growing up. I think Dylan is a really level headed guy who is quite compassionate." Maitland Hicks was 24 when he secured the role of Dylan. "I think it is great playing a younger character, it just means that when I am 30 I can play a 25 year old, it is great for career longevity to be able to play younger roles". A writer for Home and Away's website described Dylan as "Tall and lithe, with great looks and a sense of detached mystery about him" and referred to him as a "lone wolf by conditioning - socially adept, there is still a sense that he has always been the centre of his own universe." They also compared his wit with Nick Smith's (Chris Egan) boyish humour.

Dylan arrives in Summer Bay after his mother Angie (Laurie Foell) becomes Deputy Principal of the local school. He soon forms a relationship with Kirsty Sutherland (Christie Hayes). The relationship is met with disapproval from Angie. After Angie tells Dylan that Kirsty's father Rhys (Michael Beckley) is also his father, Dylan quickly puts an end to the relationship. Dylan gradually grows closer to his new-found family is torn between them and Angie, however, his decision is made easier when Angie's behavior becomes increasingly unstable as she plays mind games with Nick and begins causing trouble for Sally Fletcher (Kate Ritchie). Dylan later suffers an accident with a boat engine and needs a blood transfusion but when Rhys steps up, tests reveal that Dylan is not a Sutherland at all. Dylan is hurt that Angie lied, but the Sutherlands let him know he is always welcome. He and Kirsty try to resume their relationship but it does not feel right for either.

After realising Angie has mental problems, Dylan decides to leave town with her to get help but before they can leave, Dylan and Angie get into a heated argument which results in Dylan shoving Angie, causing her to fall and hit her head on a coffee table, killing her instantly. The truth is only revealed when Rhys, one of many suspects is about to be formally charged. He is then arrested and bailed and relocates to the city with his grandmother Monica Markham (Barbara Morton). Dylan is later acquitted of murder at the trial. Dylan returns to meet his long-lost half-sister, Tasha Andrews (Isabel Lucas) and is shocked at how much she looks like their late mother. He also tracks down Angie's lookalike Cousin, Josie (also played by Foell) at her brothel in the city when Tasha goes missing.

The episode featuring Dylan's confession to killing Angie, written by Fiona Kelly was nominated for an Australian Writer's Guild Award in 2004.

== Others ==
Date(s)	Character	Actor	Circumstances
21 January – 13 March	Pete Sutherland	Christopher Mayer	Pete is the brother of Rhys Sutherland (Michael Beckley) and the father of Max (Sebastian Elmaloglou). He arrives in the Bay to see his family. Pete's suspicious behaviour is noticeable and he is forced to admit he owes some gambling debts and he and Max flee. They return several months later but when Pete's creditors give chase, He leaves Max in the care of Rhys and his wife Shelley (Paula Forrest).
22–24 January	Brian Alcott	Richard Healy	Brian is Miles Alcott's (Steven Rooke) father. He arrives in Summer Bay for the coronal inquest into his son's death following a road accident. Alex Poulos (Danny Raco) is afraid to face him and avoids Brian. He visits Brodie Hanson (Susie Rugg), Miles' girlfriend and sees how upset she is at Alex. After Alex is found not guilty, Brian tells him he is relieved. He eventually catches up with Brodie and explains that Alex and Miles had a bond and Miles would not want Brodie to hate Alex. Before parting, Brian tells Alex not to let the accident ruin his life.
23 January	Mrs. Alcottt	Uncredited	Miles Alcott's (Steven Rooke)) mother who attends his inquest.
5–13 February	Justin Bell	Mitchell Eirth	Justin annoys Alf Stewart (Ray Meagher) when he breaks one of the surf club pool cues. Flynn Saunders (Martin Dingle-Wall) talks Alf out of calling the police, and then tried to talks to Justin. Justin tells about Flynn that he is sleeping on the streets. Flynn organizes for him to stay at the drop-in centre. The police arrive looking for Justin, who was spotted shoplifting in Yabbie Creek but he flees. It later turns out Justin's mother Maggie threw him out for being violent and took out an AVO against him. After Justin is beaten up, Flynn calls the police and Justin blames him. When Justin collapses, Charlotte Adams (Stephanie Chaves-Jacobsen) attends to him but he attacks her and flees. Flynn catches up with him but Justin later alleges Flynn assaulted him. Maggie tries to blackmail Flynn but is unsuccessful and is also in trouble with the law.
5 February – 1 April	Patricia Morgan	Gennie Nevinson	Patricia is the principal of Reefton Lakes High. She butts heads with Donald Fisher (Norman Coburn), the principal of Summer Bay High and relations are strained between the schools when both are under threat of closure. Following a bus crash, Patricia submits a proposal to the department seemingly to save both schools but it is revealed that the proposal is only to save Reefton Lakes. Patricia's son Ethan (Ben Connolly) helps Summer Bay with their campaign after discovering her deception.
6 February – 8 March	Maggie Bell	Helen O'Connor	Maggie is the mother of Justin Bell (Mitchell Eirth) and his sister, Susie. She throws Justin out due to his violent behaviour. When Justin disappears, she contacts Flynn Saunders (Martin Dingle-Wall) who helps look for him. When Justin alleges Flynn assaulted him, Maggie begins blackmailing him for $10,000 but she is foiled by Noah Lawson (Beau Brady) who calls the police.
11 February – 12 April	Grace O'Connor	Mary Docker	Grace is a nurse at Northern Districts Hospital who attends to Justin Bell after he is hospitalized and later Nick Smith (Chris Egan) following a bus crash. She begins dating Nathan Roberts (Craig Ball) but it cut short when Grace has to leave for Alice Springs. Nathan decides to join her and they leave.
18–20 February	Mr Atkins	David Webb	Atkins is a solicitor hired by the Poulos family to represent Vinnie Patterson (Ryan Kwanten) in his trial for fraud. He is unsuccessful in defending Vinnie, who is found guilty.
19 February	Greg West	Dane Carson	Greg is Josh West’s (Daniel Collopy) father. He visits following the arrival of Josh's HSC results and encourages him to attend university. Greg later falls ill and asks Josh to take over his various businesses.
20 February	Governor Williamson	Alistair Duncan	Williamson is the presiding judge over Vinnie Patterson's (Ryan Kwanten) fraud trial. He sentences him to two years imprisonment.
21 February – 8 April	Ethan Morgan	Ben Connolly	Ethan is the head of the Students Committee at Reefton Lakes High School. He helps in a student campaign to help save both his school and Summer Bay High from closure and sets up a website with live stream to cover a sit-in at Summer Bay High. Ethan declares his feelings for Brodie Hanson (Susie Rugg) but she rejects him as her boyfriend Miles Alcott (Steven Rooke) died recently but realizes his advances are in the best of intentions. The police storm the school and Ethan and the others are arrested but due to a clean criminal record, he is released.
25 February	Jenny Latham	Fiona Hepburn	Jenny is Nathan Roberts' (Craig Ball) parole officer who helps him find work.
26 February–14 August 2012	Julie Cooper	Lisa Hayson-Phillips	Julie is a nurse at Northern Districts Hospital. She befriends Flynn Saunders (Joel McIlroy) and is saddened when he dies in 2006 and she attends his funeral. She briefly dates Tony Holden (Jon Sivewright) but it goes nowhere. When Julie is attacked by an assailant revealed to be Reverend John Hall (Paul Tassone), who is suffering from a brain tumour, she refuses to treat him when he is admitted. Sam Holden frames Julie for the murder of Johnny Cooper (Callan Mulvey), but she is cleared. Julie is part of the nurses' strike against Sid Walker (Robert Mammone) but relents when Hayley Doven (Bonnie Sveen) is brought in following a car accident.
27 February – 21 March	Christopher "Kick" Johnson	Jason Clarke	Kick is an exchange teacher from Reefton Lakes High. His informal style of teaching does not sit well with Donald Fisher (Norman Coburn). When Kick's Year 10 class are involved in a bus crash, the after-effects take their toll on him and as a result he leaves Summer Bay High.
7 March – 6 September	Kelli Edwards	Alyssa-Jane Cook	Kelli is a local baker who supplies cakes for the Beachside Diner. She purchases Alex Poulos' (Danny Raco) old van and he becomes interested in her. Their relationship is ruined by the presence of Kelli's ex-husband Jason (Benj Daddario) who begins hounding Kelli. After realizing that Alex is still in love with Brodie Hanson (Susie Rugg), Kelli leaves the bay.
12 March – 17 April	Jemma MacKinnon	Thea Gumbert	Jemma is a hairdresser who works at the same salon as Kirsty Sutherland (Christie Hayes) when she drops out of school. They become fast friends and Jemma supplies Kirsty with a fake ID in order for them to go a nightclub. When Kirsty has a bad reaction to some drugs and ends up in hospital, Jemma is thrown out by her parents and is found sleeping rough by Jude Lawson (Ben Steel) and Flynn Saunders (Martin Dingle-Wall). Kirsty's mother Shelley (Paula Forrest) talks to Jemma's parents, Ray and Carmel and she returns home.
15 March – 13 September	Marie Peters	Cate Murray	Marie is the mother of Julius Peters (Leslie Brock).
28 March – 26 August	Riley Edwards	Issac Gorman	Riley and Brayden are Kelli Edwards' (Alyssa Jane Cook) sons.
28 March – 26 August	Brayden Edwards	Jamie Broadbent	Riley and Brayden are Kelli Edwards' (Alyssa Jane Cook) sons.
5–30 April 2003	Jackie Turner	Julieanne Newbould	Jackie is the mother of Josh West (Daniel Collopy). She is a journalist for a city newspaper. Jackie arrives at Summer Bay High to report on a student sleepover to protest the closure of the school, much to Josh's surprise. On her next visit, she learns Flynn Saunders (Martin Dingle-Wall) did some nude modelling and is about to run a story that could ruin his career as a counsellor but Josh and Shelley Sutherland (Paula Forrest) talk her out of it and she leaves. Josh and Shelley's daughter Dani (Tammin Sursok) visit Jackie in the city and she uses her contacts to help them find Dani's father Rhys (Michael Beckley). When Josh's father Greg (Dane Carson) falls ill, Jackie visits and encourages Josh to visit him and they leave.
17 April	Ray MacKinnon	Christopher Burke	Ray and Carmel are Gemma MacKinnon's (Thea Gumbert) parents, who are visited by Shelley Sutherland (Paula Forrest) who convinces them to let their daughter return home after she is thrown out.
17 April	Carmel MacKinnon	Meredith O'Reilly	Ray and Carmel are Gemma MacKinnon's (Thea Gumbert) parents, who are visited by Shelley Sutherland (Paula Forrest) who convinces them to let their daughter return home after she is thrown out.
19 April – 16 July	Aimee Cooper	Rhianna Griffith	Aimee appears at the drop-in centre for an orienteering competition and is placed on a team with Dani Sutherland (Tammin Sursok), Josh West (Daniel Collopy) and Brodie Hanson (Susie Rugg). Aimee and Dani clash and the group lose the competition. Aimee later takes a job at the diner and befriends Alex Poulos (Danny Raco) and Hayley Smith (Bec Cartwright). She and Hayley organize a bikini car wash which successful. Aimee begins to outstay her welcome by encroaching on Hayley and Noah Lawson's (Beau Brady) space when she moves in. When Hayley catches Aimee trying to seduce Noah, she runs away and leaves town on a passing ute. Hayley and Noah look through Aimee's forgotten belongings to gauge her wild behaviour and It is revealed that Aimee lost her father at 14 and her mother abandoned her.
23 April – 8 May	Ryan Anderson	Damien Fowler	Ryan is a kid who Donald Fisher (Norman Coburn) connects with. It becomes clear Ryan is being bullied after two boys beat him up and steal his shoes.
23 May	Captain Ellis	Christopher Galletti	Captain Ellis is the captain of the Mirgini where numerous Summer Bay residents take a cruise for the town's 150th celebrations.
27 June–4 May 2004	Caitlin	Bree Beadman	Caitlin is a classmate in Max Sutherland's (Sebastian Elmaloglou) year who takes a liking to him.
18 July – 5 September	Mav Patterson	Clayton Williams	Mav is Vinnie Patterson's (Ryan Kwanten) cousin. He attends the christening of Vinnie's son, VJ. When Alex Poulos' (Danny Raco) watch goes missing, he instantly blames Mav but the real culprit is June Reynolds (Rowena Wallace). Mav begins a relationship with Brodie Hanson (Susie Rugg) but it is short-lived when he has to leave. He asks her to join him and Charlotte Adams (Stephanie Chaves-Jacobsen) in Vietnam, but Brodie has her HSC exams. On the day of departure, Charlotte drowns and Mav later leaves alone.
1–27 August	Jason Edwards	Benj Daddario	Jason is Kelli Edwards (Alyssa Jane Cook) ex-husband and father of her two children, Riley and Brayden. He begins hounding her relentlessly and hits her. Alex Poulos (Danny Raco) warns Jason off but is beaten up for his trouble. Jesse McGregor (Ben Unwin) attacks Jason, and puts him in hospital. Kelli later reports Jason for theft of the computers at the drop-in centre.
27 August – 6 September	Bernadette	Celia Ireland	Bernadette is the manager of Yabbie Creek RSL club. She pays Colleen Smart (Lyn Collingwood) a $500 jackpot when she wins on the video poker machine while at the club.
17 October–3 July 2003	Mikey Dunn	Trent Atkinson	Mikey is an autistic student who enrolls at Summer Bay High. He befriends Seb Miller (Mitch Firth) and takes a liking to his teacher Sally Fletcher (Kate Ritchie). When a fire drill occurs, Mikey is visibly shaken and when Sally tries to calm him down he slaps her. Seb worries for Mikey when he disappears one day and fears he has drowned but he is found at the school. After the end of year dance, Mikey leaves but returns for Sally's wedding to Flynn Saunders (Joel McIlroy) and begins working for Scott Hunter (Kip Gamblin). Scott later fires Mikey and he leaves after his mother lines up a new job for him.
17 October–3 July 2003	Mrs Dunn	Susan Kennedy	Mikey's mother.
17 October	Kelvin Matthews	James Donnellan	Kelvin is a customer of the surf club gym who tries to make unwanted advances on Hayley Smith (Bec Cartwright) but is beaten up by Jesse McGregor (Ben Unwin) and subsequently presses charges on him.
17–25 October	Tara	Rebecca Murphy	Tara is an old friend of Sally Fletcher (Kate Ritchie) who attended primary school with her. Sally asks Tara to be a surrogate for her and Flynn Saunders (Martin Dingle-Wall). The plan falls apart when Tara reveals she was involved in a car accident that killed her husband and youngest daughter. Flynn contacts Tara's family and convinces her to reconnect with them and she leaves the bay.
6–12 November	Grigg	Amos Szeps	Grigg is a former cellmate of Jesse McGregor (Ben Unwin). He blackmails Jesse for $20,000 and then takes him, Nick Smith (Chris Egan) and Irene Roberts (Lynne McGranger) hostage in their own home. When Grigg is disturbed by Donald Fisher (Norman Coburn), he flees and steals his car. Grigg is found dead several days later in Donald's car.
