= Elyne Mitchell =

Australian author (1913 – 2002)

Elyne Mitchell OAM
- Born: Elyne Chauvel; 30 December 1913; Melbourne, Victoria, Australia
- Died: 4 March 2002 (aged 88); Corryong, Victoria, Australia
- Education: St Catherine's School, Toorak
- Occupations: Writer, cattlewoman, champion skier
- Spouse: Thomas Walter Mitchell (1935–1984, his death)
- Children: Indi Mitchell; Harry Mitchell; Honor Auchinleck; John Mitchell
- Relatives: Sir Harry Chauvel (father); Charles Chauvel (cousin)
- Writing career
- Genres: Children's, non-fiction
- Subject: Australian Alps
- Notable work: Silver Brumby series
- Notable awards: Medal of the Order of Australia

Elyne Mitchell, OAM (née Chauvel, 30 December 1913 – 4 March 2002) was an Australian author noted for the Silver Brumby series of children's novels. Her nonfiction works draw on family history and culture.

== Biography ==
Sybil Elyne Keith Chauvel was born in Melbourne on 30 December 1913. She was the daughter of General Sir Henry Chauvel, who was the commander of the ANZAC Mounted Division Light Horse and Desert Mounted Corps in World War I, later famous for the charge at Beersheba.

She was educated at St Catherine's School, Toorak. She married lawyer, and later parliamentarian, Thomas Walter Mitchell in 1935 and moved with him to the Snowy Mountains. He taught her to ski, and they had four children. Mitchell became a keen skier and horsewoman – in 1938 she won the Canadian downhill skiing championship, and according to Tom Wright, in 1941 she became the first woman to descend the entire western face of the Snowy Mountains on skis.

During World War II, her husband enlisted in the 2nd A.I.F. and was posted to the 8th Division in Singapore where he was captured by the Japanese. Mitchell ran the property by herself until her husband's return at the end of the war.

== Writing ==
Her novels describe eastern Australian terrain and wildlife in considerable detail. She was part of a wave of nationalist Australian writing that gathered strength in the late 1930s and 1940s, and her work is generally described as having a landscape aesthetic. Although the horses and other animals in her books speak to each other, they are not anthropomorphic and, particularly in the first two Silver Brumby books, otherwise behave naturally.

According to an interview with Tom Wright, the Silver Brumby series arose from Mitchell's difficulties in finding suitable reading material for her daughter Indi, then 10 and being raised in some isolation on the Mitchell family property Towong Hill, a remote cattle station in the Snowy Mountains.

Set in the Snowy Mountains area of the Australian Alps around Mount Kosciuszko in southern New South Wales and northern Victoria, the Snowy Brumby books recount the life of the pale palomino brumby stallion Thowra from his birth in The Silver Brumby (first published 1958) to Silver Brumby Whirlwind. The Silver Brumby was the basis of a film of the same name in 1993 starring Caroline Goodall as Mitchell and Russell Crowe as The Man. This film was also released under the title The Silver Stallion: King of the Wild Brumbies. There is also a children's cartoon TV series of the same name, which uses some character names, but is a loose adaptation of the books.

Mitchell's other works of fiction are also set in the Snowy Mountains around Thredbo and the Cascade Hut and are populated by brumbies and other animals, native and feral. The brumby stories generally intersect geographically or thematically with the Silver Brumby books, and various characters from the Silver Brumby books may appear in the others. She often also illustrated her work with her own photographs.

== Awards and honours ==
Mitchell was awarded the Medal of the Order of Australia for services to literature in 1990. In 1993, Charles Sturt University awarded her an Honorary Doctorate of Letters. She also won Children's Book Council awards: The Silver Brumby was highly commended in the 1959 Book of the Year, Silver Brumby's Daughter was commended in 1961 and Winged Skis was highly commended in 1965. Mitchell used several typewriters, including a 1936 Corona, which can be seen at the National Museum of Australia in Canberra. The Corryong Library in North East Victoria was renamed in Mitchell's honour in 2001, and a rural women's literary award (with prizes totalling $2,000) has been named after her.

== Bibliography ==
=== Fiction ===
- Flow River, Blow Wind (1953)
- Black Cockatoos Mean Snow (1956)
- The Silver Brumby (1958)
- Silver Brumby's Daughter (1960)
- Kingfisher Feather (1962)
- Winged Skis (1964)
- Silver Brumbies of the South (1965)
- Silver Brumby Kingdom (1966)
- Moon Filly (1968)
- Jinki: Dingo of the Snows (1970)
- Light Horse to Damascus (1971)
- Silver Brumby Whirlwind (1973)
- The Colt at Taparoo (1973)
- Son of the Whirlwind (1979)
- The Colt from Snowy River (1980)
- Snowy River Brumby (1980)
- Brumby Racer (1981)
- The Man from Snowy River (1982) (novelization of the screenplay of the film, based on the poem by Banjo Paterson)
- The Lighthorsemen (1987) (novelization of the screenplay of the film)
- Silver Brumby, Silver Dingo (1993)
- Dancing Brumby (1995)
- Brumby Stories (1995)
- Brumbies of the Night (1996)
- Dancing Brumby's Rainbow (1998)
- The Thousandth Brumby (1999)
- Wild Echoes Ringing (2003)

=== Nonfiction ===
- Australia's Alps (1942)
- Speak to the Earth (1945)
- Soil and Civilization (1946)
- Images in Water (1947)
- Australian Treescapes: A Photographic Study (1960) (photographs by Harold Cazneaux et al.)
- Light Horse: The Story of Australia's Mounted Troops (1978)
- Chauvel Country – The Story of a Great Australian Pioneering Family (1983)
- Discoverers of the Snowy Mountains (1985) ISBN 0-333-40068-2
- Vision of the Snowy Mountains (1988)
- Towong Hill: Fifty Years on an Upper Murray Cattle Station (1989)
