= Sebastian Elmaloglou =

Australian actor

Sebastian Elmaloglou is an Australian actor best known for playing Max Sutherland on the long-running Australian soap opera Home and Away from 2002 to 2004.

== Background ==
Elmaloglou trained at the Keane Kids Studios where he studied acting, singing, and dancing. He has worked on numerous stage productions with Sydney Theatre Company and Sydney Opera. He made two appearances on G.P. and one on Fallen Angels prior to joining Home and Away. He has also worked on television ads. His brothers, Peter and Dominic Elmaloglou, and his sister Rebekah Elmaloglou have also appeared on Home and Away. Dominic played Sebastian Harrison in 1996, and Rebekah is well known for playing Sophie Simpson from 1990 to 1993. He is the cousin of English actors Jeffrey and Judi Dench.

== Career ==
=== Filmography ===
Year	Title	Role	Notes
1995	G.P.	Dominic Garland	Season 7, episode 23: "You Say Potato"
1996	G.P.	Danny Papadopoulos	Season 8, episode 6: "Someone to Turn To"
1997	Fallen Angels	Troy Everett	Season 1, episode 9: "Baby It's You"
2002–04	Home and Away	Max Sutherland	Season 15–17 (main role)
2002	Home and Away: Secrets and the City	Max Sutherland	Video special
2003	Home and Away: Hearts Divided	Max Sutherland	Video special
2016	Tender	Rescue Soldier	Short film (also property master)

=== Theatre ===
- Gypsy Boy (2001)
- Burnt Piano (1999)
- Merrily Rolling Along (1996)
