= Adventures on Kythera =

- Genre: Children; Adventure
- Directed by: John Tatoulis
- Starring: Amelia Frid
- Country of origin: Australia
- Original language: English
- No. of seasons: 2
- No. of episodes: 13

Production
- Producer: John Tatoulis

Original release
- Release: 13 August 1991 – 1992

Adventures on Kythera is an Australian children's television series about five children who have adventures on the Greek island of Kythera.

It premiered on 13 August 1991 on the Nine Network and aired until 1992. There were 13 episodes filmed but it was screened as two series, consisting of seven and six episodes. The series was produced and directed by John Tatoulis and written by Deborah Parsons.

The series also aired in the United Kingdom on the ITV network between summer 1991 and Easter 1992.

== Cast ==
- Amelia Frid as Molly Leeds
- Rebekah Elmaloglou as Tik
- Zenton Chorny as Zenton
- Garry Perazzo as Spike
- George Lekkas as Johnny
- Richard Aspel as Vincent
- Tassos Ioannides as Philippas
- Kerry Noonan as Pia
- Michelle Royal as Annie
