= Sherman's Way =

- Promotional film poster
- Directed by: Craig Saavedra
- Written by: Tom Nance
- Produced by: Craig Saavedra
- Starring: James LeGros; Enrico Colantoni; Michael Shulman; Brooke Nevin; Donna Murphy; Thomas Ian Nicholas; Lacey Chabert
- Cinematography: Joaquin Sedillo
- Edited by: Christopher Gay
- Music by: David Michael Frank
- Production company: Starry Night Entertainment
- Distributed by: International Film Circuit
- Release date: February 29, 2008 (Cinequest Film Festival)
- Running time: 97 minutes
- Country: United States
- Language: English
- Box office: $13,282

Sherman's Way is a 2008 American independent comedy-drama film starring James LeGros, Enrico Colantoni, Lacey Chabert, Donna Murphy, Brooke Nevin, and Michael Shulman. The film was directed by Craig Saavedra, written by Thomas R. Nance, and produced by Starry Night Entertainment. Sherman's Way completed principal photography in 2007 and was shot in Manhattan, and in Los Angeles, Clear Lake, and Kelseyville, California.

== Plot ==
The life of Yale Law School student Sherman takes an unexpected turn when he decides to follow his girlfriend's advice and take more chances in life. She meant their relationship. But Sherman's new spontaneity lands him in the car seat next to Palmer, a washed-up, cheerfully eccentric former Olympic athlete.

Dumped and cut off from his mother's funds, Sherman has to travel with Palmer to Southern California for an important job opportunity.

== Cast ==
- James LeGros as Palmer
- Enrico Colantoni as D.J.
- Michael Shulman as Sherman Black
- Brooke Nevin as Addy
- Donna Murphy as Evelyn Black
- Thomas Ian Nicholas as Tom
- Lacey Chabert as Marcy
