= Silver Brumby =

Novel series by Elyne Mitchell

- 6
- Author: Elyne Mitchell
- Translator: Various
- Illustrator: Various
- Cover artist: Various
- Country: Australia
- Language: English
- Genre: Children's, novel
- Published: 1958-1979
- Media type: Print (hardback & paperback)

The Silver Brumby series is a collection of fiction children's books by Australian author Elyne Mitchell. They recount the life and adventures of Thowra, a magnificent 'creamy' brumby (Australian feral horse), and his descendants, and are set in the Snowy Mountains of Australia around Mount Kosciusko.

== Books ==
	Title	Year	Summary
1	The Silver Brumby	1958	Thowra, the silver brumby, must evade danger from both man and horse in his journey to become king of the brumbies.
2	Silver Brumby's Daughter	1960	Kunama, daughter and eldest creamy offspring of Thowra, journeys away from the secret valley to find her own herd to belong with.
3	Silver Brumbies of the South	1965	Baringa, son of Kunama, and Lightning, Kunama's younger brother, are led by Thowra to the south to start their own herds.
4	Silver Brumby Kingdom	1966	The continuing story of Baringa and his rivalry with his uncle Lightning, as Baringa grows to become the Silver Stallion of the South.
5	Silver Brumby Whirlwind	1973	An elderly Thowra journeys to the north to pursue a mysterious mare named Yuri.
6	Son of the Whirlwind	1979	Yuri's son, Wirramirra, travels south in search of his father, Thowra.

The following books are generally not seen as part of the main Silver Brumby series, but several of them feature characters or locations from the Silver Brumby and could be considered to exist within the same fictional universe.

Title	Year	Summary
Silver Brumby, Silver Dingo	1993	A tale of an unlikely friendship between an orphaned brumby and dingo, and an eagle. Unlike other books in the series, this book contains no dialogue from the main characters.
Dancing Brumby	1995	A colt is captured by a little girl and her father, and is then trained in the circus. He learns the airs above grounds.
Dancing Brumby's Rainbow	1998	Sequel to, 'Dancing Brumby', A tale of a young lippizaner colt who was trained in a circus, and escaped to live in the Snowy Mountains.
Brumbies of the Night	1996	
The Colt from Snowy River	1980	
Moon Filly	1968	Wurring, a chestnut stallion, and the strangely beautiful mare Illinga desperately try to find each other despite the efforts of an evil iron-grey stallion.
Brumby Stories	1995	
The Thousandth Brumby	1999	

== The Silver Brumby ==
=== Characters ===
==== Thowra ====
Thowra is a creamy-silver stallion, son of the chestnut stallion Yarraman and the creamy mare Bel Bel. Being born in a storm, his dam named him after the Aboriginal word for 'wind' not only for the gale outside when he was born, but because she was worried he would have to be as fast as the wind to remain free from the tyranny of man. The majority of brumbies in the southern areas of Australia being black, bay, brown and grey, the appearance of a cream horse causes quite a stir among wild herds and humans alike. Thowra is met with open hostility from other horses, stallions in particular, while the men of the mountains quickly become obsessed with trying to capture him for his rarity. To survive, Thowra is forced to become more cunning than both horse and man.

Though he is mentioned in nearly every Silver Brumby book, Thowra is only a main character in The Silver Brumby (and Silver Brumby Whirlwind), where he wins Golden for his mate, defeats the powerful stallion Brolga, wins Boon Boon as his mate, and becomes King of the Cascade Brumbies, but there is always the ever-present threat of man, and at the end of the first novel, Thowra is forced to pull off a seemingly suicidal trick to stay free. There is some indication that he can shapeshift into a white hawk and a whirlwind. In the rest of the series, he is an ancestor of nearly all of the protagonists, and often helps them (and others) on their respective journeys.

==== Bel Bel ====
A wise, creamy mare, mother of Thowra and good friends with Mirri, Storm's mother, Bel Bel runs with the stallion Yarraman, and in some cases is entrusted to go ahead and guide. Bel Bel, like Thowra, is scared of people, although in her case because she had always been hunted for her unusual colouration. She showed her son Thowra the ways of the hunted life, passing all her wisdom to him, which in turn Thowra passed down to his mare, Boon Boon, his daughter, Kunama, and his grandson, Baringa. He also tried to pass it down to his son, Lightning, and one of his favorite mares, Golden. Bel Bel is often described as a 'lone wolf' and dies on her own on the Ramshead Range, after one final chase. Bel Bel was the lead mare of Yarraman's herd.

===== Thowra's herd =====
- Boon Boon (daughter of The Brolga; Thowra's first mate)
- Golden
- Kunama (once fully grown, joined Tambo's Herd)
- Koora
- Cirrus
- Yuri
- Wingilla (born from Boon Boon)
- unnamed black mare
- 2 unnamed grey mares (daughters of Brolga)
- unnamed chestnut daughter of Arrow
- Arrow's black mare
- creamy colt with dark points (firstborn of Boon Boon)
- 2 unnamed dun foals
- Jillamatong 'Jilla' (creamy with dark points, born in Thowra's Cascade Herd)
- Wanga (creamy with dark points, born in Thowra's Cascade Herd)
- Yuri
- Dilkara

Many unnamed mares are also in his herd but are not mentioned in the story as they run separately with Storm's herd.

==== Other characters ====
Yarraman: Thowra's handsome flaxen chestnut father, he is the greatest stallion of the High country mountains and king of the Cascade Brumbies, until the Brolga takes over, and then, Thowra takes over.

The Brolga: The rival grey stallion. After battling Yarraman as a young stallion, he defeats and kills him when he reaches his prime. In turn, when Thowra reaches maturity, he defeats The Brolga, leaving him alive, and becomes king of the Cascade brumbies.

Boon Boon: The Brolga's daughter, she joined Thowra's herd when she left her father's herd. She eventually became Thowra's mate. Boon Boon is the wisest mare Thowra has ever met.

Golden: A palomino mare who, born with humans, is bought by the man pursuing Thowra. Thowra is intrigued by the stunning mare and shows her how to jump the fence of man. With the help of Storm, Thowra makes Golden jump over a fence. She lives with Thowra through the winter and into the summer. Through the winter Golden is carrying Thowra's foal. Although she lives in the wild, Golden lacked the confidence to give birth to Thowra's daughter without the help of man. Later, Thowra returns, bringing Golden and their foal, Kunama, to the Hidden Valley.

Arrow: Thowra's older half brother (sired also by Yarraman), he is described to have Yarraman's flaxen chestnut colouring but his mother's cruel attitude and pinched looking face.

Storm: Thowra's bay half brother, sired by Yarraman. Storm's mother is Mirri.

Mirri: Storm's mother, best friend to Bel Bel, she is described as a bay mare.

Kunama: The first daughter of Thowra and Golden, her name means snow. She is beautiful and has joined Tambo's herd along with Jillimatong and Wanda, two other palomino mares.

== Silver Brumby's Daughter ==
=== Kunama ===
Thowra and Golden's daughter, Kunama, is a free-spirited and beautiful young filly, one of the first creamies begotten by Thowra. Her name means snow. As a two-year-old, she is shown to possess a depth of intuition that is not shared by Thowra, her sire. This is perhaps partially because mares, without the luxury of a stallion's great strength and with the responsibility of foals at foot, must possess even greater wisdom than even the stallions of their herds if they are to remain free and wild. Kunama, having been trained in bush craft by both Thowra and Boon Boon, is cautious and wary of men, but not even this caution is enough to keep her in Thowra's Hidden Valley when her interest is captured by a young, spirited black stallion with an unusual splash of white on his flank, named Tambo, who is the son of a chestnut racehorse and another racehorse 'Highland Lass'. In the wild excitement of running with another young horse, Kunama does not heed the warnings of the wiser bush animals, and runs in the mountains for far longer than she should, even returning to the Cascades with Tambo during the summer, despite it being 'a time a silver filly must remain hidden or fear capture'. Eventually, a boy and his father manage to capture the silver filly, with the intention of turning her into a stock horse, but Kunama's longing for her freedom only succeeds in turning her into what the stock men call a bad horse. Kunama is eventually given her freedom by the boy out of pity, and she makes her way back to the Hidden Valley, remaining there with Tambo.

Kunama is full sister to Lighting and half-sister to Jillamatong and Wanga, both creamies but with dark freckles. She is dam to Baringa and an unnamed chestnut filly.

== Silver Brumbies of the South and Silver Brumby Kingdom ==
=== Baringa ===
Nephew to Lightning and son of Kunama, Baringa is a true silver horse. Strong, swift and smart, he is truly Thowra's grandson, but when Thowra takes him to the southern lands he is only a yearling. When he adds the beautiful Dawn to his herd, life becomes even more dangerous, but Baringa soon finds a secret canyon where he can keep his herd, and he learns how to fight just as well as his grandsire. Eventually, he becomes the Silver Stallion of Quambat Flat.

Baringa's name means 'dawn' or 'light' in an Aboriginal language. Baringa's story is told in the books Silver Brumbies of the South and Silver Brumby Kingdom. Baringa is also known to have the most beautiful herd anyone has seen in the south.

=== Baringa's herd ===
- Dawn: 'White and silver' filly.
- Moon: 'White and silver filly' or 'The Hidden filly'.
- Yarolala: flaxen chestnut filly, she is a throwback to Yarraman line and a daughter of Son Of Storm.
- Kalina: 'Cream and silver' colt. Baringa's first-born son, first foal of Dawn, he was born during a great flood.
- An unnamed snow white filly foal by Moon.
- A blue roan filly, daughter of White-Face, who was also brought to Baringa by Thowra.
- A lazy pert round white mare who belonged to the black stallion previously, she thinks everything is a joke (she also thought a big deal of herself, wanting Thowra to fight for her), brought to Baringa by Thowra.

=== Dawn ===
The first mare to join Baringa's herd, Lightning and Baringa first saw her dancing in a spiral of silver mist on Quambat Flat. Though Lightning tried many times to (unsuccessfully) win Dawn over, she decided to run with the more compassionate Baringa. In the events of Silver Brumby Kingdom, Dawn is separated from the herd by a terrible flood and Baringa goes to search for her, eventually finding her on a small island in the middle of a river. By this time she has borne Baringa's foal, whom they name Kalina. Of interest is the fact that, though Baringa already has a herd, it is heavily implied in Silver Brumby Kingdom that Dawn is the mare he loves most, even to the extent of leaving his herd to search for her. Dawn is Moon's half-sister, and the two seem to be great friends.

=== Moon ===
The second mare to join Baringa's herd, she was called the 'hidden one'. She looks and has the same hoofprint as her half-sister Dawn. Moon originally followed The Ugly One. Her first foal was a snowy white filly.

=== Pert White Mare ===
One of the mares Thowra brought for Baringa. She was originally owned by the black stallion, but when Thowra decided to steal her, she went along willingly, yet slowly. She is described as 'lazy' and 'round'. Often called "Pert" Thowra is embarrassed but enjoys her stubbornness and is often 'fun'.

=== Unnamed Blue Roan Mare ===
One of the mares Thowra brought for Baringa. When Thowra was looking for Baringa, she was the only one of her herd to tell him anything.

=== Kalina ===
Son of Dawn and Baringa, Kalina was born when Dawn was swept by the river onto a small island, and it took Baringa days to find her. Though Baringa originally wanted to name Kalina after the flood, Dawn believed that their foal shouldn't be called something so terrible, and they named him Kalina - "for the marvellous beauty of the frost on snow". He also sired Yuri's foal whilst they were searching for Thowra.

=== Koora ===
Thowra's mare whom he left to run with Baringa. He had a silver colt with pale roan ears, Dilkara.

=== Lightning ===
Son of Thowra and Golden and the full brother of Kunama, Lightning is one of the only three silver foals Thowra sires. After being hidden away in the Secret Valley for two years, he is taken south by Thowra, along with Baringa. Lightning is beautiful but arrogant and is said by Thowra to have been almost as difficult as Golden to train in the way of the bush. He is captivated by Dawn's beauty and constantly pursues her for his herd, but appears that Goonda is the mare he loves the most. When the black stallion comes looking for his stolen mares and becomes captivated by Goonda, Lightning learns one thing, that even the remembered beauty of Dawn meant nothing to him compared with his feeling for Goonda.

Lightning finally concedes that he must not go after Baringa's mares when Baringa defeats the black stallion when he could not.

=== Lightning's herd ===
- Goonda: Red roan filly
- unnamed colt born to Goonda
- 2 unnamed grey mares
- 2 blue roan mares (stolen from the black stallion and won by Baringa who gifts them to Lightning)
- Yarolala: Chestnut flaxen filly (who later joins Baringa's herd)
- 3 unnamed roan mares (stolen and taken back by the black)

=== Goonda ===
Goonda is a beautiful red (chestnut/sorrel) roan mare and the first mare to join Lightning's herd when they were both two years old. She is the daughter of Whiteface. Lightning won her after his first real fight against another grey colt. Her name means fire. She grows into a lovely mare with Thowra surprised at how beautiful she's become and the black stallion stopping in his tracks when he saw her. She adores Lightning and when she sees him fight for her as though possessed by the spirit of Thowra, knows that she will belong to Lightning forever.

=== Yarolala ===
A chestnut flaxen filly whose colouring is a throwback to the Yarraman line. She is a daughter of Son of Storm. Yarolala heeds Lightning's call with the intention of following Baringa but loses track of him as he melts into the bush before either she or Lightning realizes he's gone. She stays with Lightning's herd but spends most of her time wandering in search of Baringa who she considers to be 'the most beautiful horse in the mountains'.

== Coat colours ==
Many of the brumbies are described in the books using colloquial terms such as 'creamy' or 'silver' or compared to the sun or moon, leading to debate on the genetics of the horses described in the books. It is likely that Elyne Mitchell took a lot of poetic licence when describing the characters in the series.

=== Creamies ===
Thowra and his lineage (Bel Bel, Golden, Kunama, Lightning, Baringa, etc) are all referred to as creamies in the books, notable within the story for being a rare colour to see in the wild. Given Thowra's chestnut father, and Golden's name, the closest real-life analogue to 'creamy' would be Palomino. Some of the creamy horses are described as 'silver' for how pale their coats become over winter, but they noted to be different from grey or white horses such as Cloud (Grey) or Dawn (White).

In the cartoon series and the film released in the mid-1990s, the 'creamies' are represented as palominos, but earlier cover art shows the silver horses as greys (white).

=== White (Dawn & Moon) ===
Dawn and Moon are described as distinct from the creamy horses, and are likely cremello due to their grey parents, or were born grey and 'whited out' later in life.

=== Ilinga, Wuring and Yuri ===
Yuri's coat oat colour is described as being both a dark chestnut, and as having a coat that glows with reflected moonlight. This description is similar to the metallic coats of Akhal-Teke's, a known influence on feral brumbies. It is heavily suggested by Elyne Mitchell that the "moon horses" are a special breed that is very refined and beautiful beyond their colour alone. It is unknown if she was inspired by the rare Akhal-Teke.

Wurring also may carry this glowing metallic sheen since he is described as glowing like the sun itself.

Ilinga is described for the most part described to be a very dark brown, but as she matures she is described with 'the colour of moonlight running across her back', and strands of silver in her hair. She could be a silver dapple black, but since silver dapples are described in some of the novels, it seems strange that the author would not describe them as such.

== Controversy ==
Brumbies are considered an invasive pest species in Australia and are credited with doing massive damage to the native habitat of the snowy mountains, where the Silver Brumby series is set. Government programs seek to control their numbers by culling, but some Australians defend the brumbies and protest the cullings.

The Silver Brumby and other brumby-centric books by Elyne Mitchell are credited with creating sympathy and fondness for the brumbies, and perpetuating the idea that brumbies are a classic staple of the Australian bush.

== Adaptations ==
In 1993 the first book, The Silver Brumby, was adapted into a film of the same name. The film starred Russell Crowe, Caroline Goodall and Amiel Daemion. It was released as The Silver Stallion: King of the Wild in some countries.

The series was also adapted into a children's cartoon TV series of the same name in 1996. Running for 3 seasons with a total of 39 episodes, the series uses some character names, but is a loose adaptation of the books.
