= Michael Shulman (actor) =

American actor

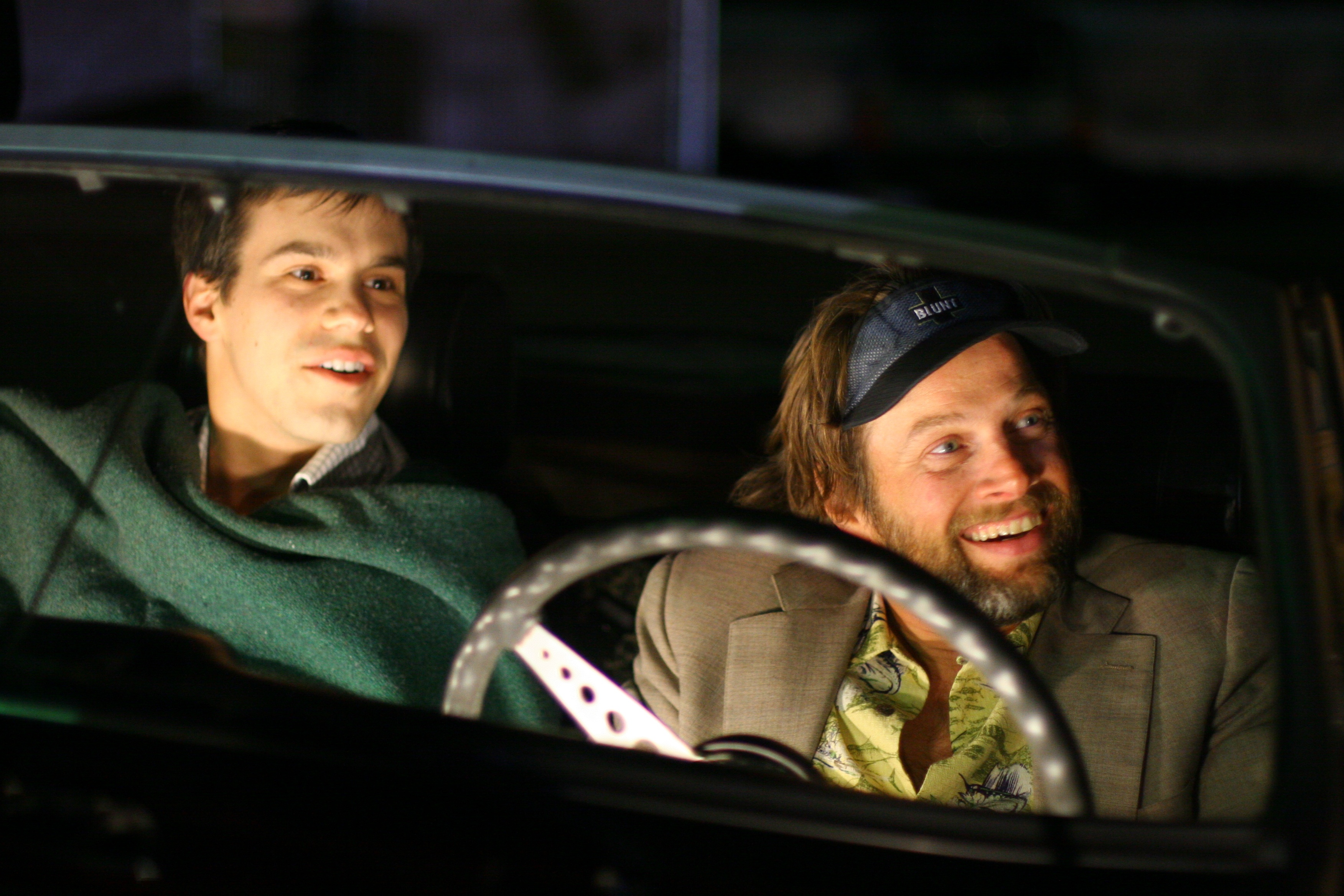
- Michael Shulman and James LeGros on the set of Sherman's Way
- Born: New York City, New York, U.S.
- Occupation: Actor
- Years active: 1989–present

Michael Shulman is an American film, stage, television actor and producer. Shulman is the founder of Sand & Snow Entertainment, a company formed in 2021. Previously, he was the co-owner of the New York and Los Angeles-based production company Starry Night Entertainment alongside Craig Saavedra.

== Early life ==
Shulman was born in New York City and was a child actor. He appeared in several plays and musicals, including a two-year run on Broadway in Les Misérables, the original cast of Stephen Sondheim's Assassins, and two plays by John Guare. He was a member of the cast of Recess and played the role of the Hustler Kid. It was during this time that he began his recording career and has since appeared on more than five albums. Shulman next turned to television and film and landed several roles, including Jodie Foster's Little Man Tate, M. Night Shyamalan's Wide Awake, Disney's Can of Worms, Fox's Party of Five (1994), and as Benny in the HBO special Someone Had to Be Benny (1996) for which he was nominated for a CableAce and Daytime Emmy Award.

== Career ==
In 1999, Shulman starred in the Disney Original film Can of Worms as its protagonist. In 2009, Shulman produced and starred in the comedy/drama Sherman's Way opposite James LeGros, Enrico Colantoni, Brooke Nevin, Donna Murphy, and Lacey Chabert with whom he also did Les Miserables on Broadway.

From 2010–2014, Shulman appeared in TV shows ranging from Law & Order, Unforgettable, the feature film The Word, and the Atlantic Theater Company's White People by J. T. Rogers, while also producing the New York premiere of Mistakes Were Made at Barrow Street Theatre with Academy Award nominated actor Michael Shannon. In 2014, Shulman and Saavedra's production arm Starry Night Entertainment earned its first two Tony Award nominations as producers on Broadway's After Midnight and The Cripple of Inishmaan starring Daniel Radcliffe.

Shulman and Saavedra invested in Hedwig and the Angry Inch, both on Broadway and on National Tour, The Elephant Man with Bradley Cooper, Photograph 51 starring Nicole Kidman on the West End, Les Liaisons Dangereuses starring Liev Schreiber and Labour of Love starring Martin Freeman.

Shulman and Saavedra opened the West End premiere of John Logan's Red and The Lieutenant of Inishmore by Martin McDonagh. Later that year, the team produced the Broadway transfer of The Ferryman. The play won the 2019 Tony Award for Best Play.

With theaters shut down due to the pandemic, Shulman started his Sand & Snow venture. Shulman won his second Tony Award for The Lehmany Trilogy, his third in 2025 for Sunset Boulevard and has become a prolific producer both on Broadway and on the West End. In 2025/2026, Shulman produced ART on Broadway starring James Corden, Neil Patrick Harris, and Bobby Cannavale. Shulman is the producer of BASURA soon coming to Broadway composed by Gloria Estefan and Emily Estefan
