= Rhapsody in Bloom =

- Film Poster
- Directed by: Craig M. Saavedra
- Written by: Eric Tuchman
- Produced by: Steven Felder; Craig M. Saavedra
- Starring: Penelope Ann Miller; Ron Silver; Craig Sheffer; Caroline Goodall
- Cinematography: Wally Pfister
- Edited by: Mary Jo Markey; Lucyna Wojciechowski
- Music by: David Michael Frank
- Production company: Becker Filmworks
- Distributed by: Starz! Movie Channel; Image Organization; Behaviour Entertainment
- Release date: January 2, 1998
- Running time: 92 min.
- Country: United States
- Language: English
- Budget: $2,200,000 (estimated)

Rhapsody in Bloom is a 1998 American television film, starring Penelope Ann Miller, Ron Silver, Craig Sheffer and Caroline Goodall. It was directed by Craig Saavedra.

== Plot ==
Humor and self-awareness emerge in the Lilah Bloom's life as she ventures out to start a new life with a musician.

== Cast ==
- Penelope Ann Miller as Lilah Bloom
- Ron Silver as Mitch Bloom
- Craig Sheffer as Jack Safrenek
- Caroline Goodall as Debra Loomis
- Scott Patterson as Phil
