= Amelia Frid =

Australian actress

- Born: 30 July 1975 (age 50); Soviet Union
- Occupation: Actress
- Years active: 1987–1993
- Notable work: Cody Willis in Neighbours

Amelia Frid (born 30 July 1975) is an Australian former child actress, known for originating the role of Cody Willis in Neighbours.

== Early life ==
Frid was born on 30 July 1975. She left her birth place of Russia and arrived in Australia by boat at the age of five. She attended prep in Melbourne.

== Career ==
In 1988, Frid was cast as Molly in the children's television series Adventures on Kythera. It was not broadcast in Australia until 1991. She also appeared in the 1989 film Celia.

In 1989, at the age of 14, she secured a regular role as the first incarnation of Cody Willis in Neighbours. Her character was romantically paired with Todd Landers (played by Kristian Schmid). Frid departed from the role in order to focus on her VCE (Victorian Certificate of Education), in her final year of high school. Her final appearance in Neighbours was on 30 July 1991 (her 16th birthday). Peta Brady was later cast in the role.

Frid's final acting work was with former Neighbours co-star Ashley Paske (who played Matt Robinson). In the tradition of fellow Neighbours actors, she appeared in a Christmas pantomime performance of Aladdin in Oxford, UK in 1992, playing the princess to Paske's Aladdin.

After high school, Frid enrolled in an arts/law degree at Monash University in Melbourne, taking a gap year travelling to Israel and Egypt, before resuming her studies. She also studied psychology. She undertook an internship as a student counsellor at Deakin University for a year, before taking a job working as a therapist at Ararat Prison. She currently works as a psychologist in Prahran, Melbourne.

== Personal life ==
Frid is a mother to three boys.

== Acting credits ==
Year	Title	Role	Notes
1989	Celia	Stephanie Burke	Feature film
1989–1991	Neighbours	Cody Willis	TV series
1991	Adventures on Kythera	Molly Leeds	TV series
1992–1993	Aladdin	The Princess	Apollo Theatre, Oxford, UK
