= Brumby (surname) =

Brumby is a surname. Notable people with the surname include:

- Beatrice Brumby (1914–2012), Australian pioneer
- Colin Brumby (1933–2018), Australian composer and conductor
- Christine Brumby (born 1965), Aboriginal Australian artist born in Areyonga, Northern Territory
- Frank H. Brumby (1874–1950), American admiral
- Glen Brumby (born 1960), Australian squash player
- John Brumby (born 1953), Australian politician, premier of Victoria 2007–10
- Monique Brumby (born 1974), Australian musician
- Sandy Brumby (born c. 1950), Aboriginal Australian artist
