= In Too Deep (1989 film) =

- Directed by: John Tatoulis; Colin South
- Written by: Deb Parsons
- Produced by: John Tatoulis; Colin South
- Starring: Santa Press; Hugo Race; Rebekah Elmaloglou
- Production company: Media World
- Distributed by: Home Cinema Group (video)
- Release date: 1989
- Running time: 103 minutes
- Country: Australia
- Language: English
- Budget: AU $800,000

In Too Deep is a 1989 erotic thriller film.

Producer Colin South later said "It was a very moody European type of film. I’m not ashamed of it...the intention for the film was not even an arthouse release."

== Cast ==
- Santa Press as Mack
- Hugo Race as Wendy
- Rebekah Elmaloglou as Jojo
- John Flaus as Milas
- Dominique Sweeney as Dinny
- Craig Alexander as Ivan
- Gerda Nicolson as Mr Lyall
- Sheryl Munks as Girl on street

== Production ==
The film was raised through private investment including the producers own money. Two weeks into the five-week shoot a major investor pulled out but they managed to complete the film. It was shot under the title Mack the Knife.

John Tatoulis later stated:

I was interested in two things in In Too Deep: one was the corruption of innocents and the other was the strengths and weaknesses of sexuality. And I wanted to set it in an urban landscape. What I was really keen to do was create a mood and a feel through a variety of ways. I believe that film is like a tapestry and all the components that go to making the texture of that tapestry are all important: sound, pictures, editing, performances, direction. If one doesn't work, then the final tapestry won't have the texture the director had in his or her mind to start with. If a film doesn't have a feeling, a feeling that has a texture to it, then it's lacking. So that was something I was very keen to explore: how do I give this film a feeling of claustrophobia, a feeling of heat, a feeling of menace and vulnerability.

== Release ==
Despite the film's low budget it managed to be widely seen around the world on video. South reflected in 1995, "We borrowed the money and we’re still paying it off [laughter], but it did achieve a couple of things. It got recognition for the cinematographer with the A.C.S., and it got good critical response. We didn’t and still haven’t sought a theatrical release for it, though. I suppose the values that we placed upon it were not the same values that a theatrical release would have required."
