= The Jesus Christ Show =

KFI AM weekly radio program

- Genre: Talk radio
- Running time: 3 hours
- Country of origin: United States
- Syndicates: Premiere Networks
- Created by: Neil Saavedra
- Recording studio: KFI Los Angeles
- Original release: June 1, 2008 – present
- Website: TheJesusChristShow.com
- Podcast: KFIam640.com/JesusChrist.xml

The Jesus Christ Show is a syndicated radio program that airs every Sunday from 6 to 9 a.m. Pacific Time. It is carried on the Premiere Networks, a subsidiary of iHeartMedia, Inc. AM 640 KFI in Los Angeles serves as the flagship station where the show is produced. It is billed as "Hosted by Jesus Christ."

Jesus is played by the show's producer, Neil Saavedra, who wears many hats at KFI, including hosting "The Fork Report," a Saturday afternoon food show, as well as selling advertising for the station. Saavedra refers to himself on-air as "your holy host." He does not believe that he is actually Jesus Christ. The show describes itself as "...interactive radio theater designed to teach people about themselves and the historical person of Jesus." The premise is presented on the air as "What if you could talk to Him, laugh with Him, learn from Him?"

The show became a part of Premiere Networks on June 1, 2008, and is syndicated to radio stations in the U.S., including KOGO in San Diego, KDFD in Denver, KSTE in Sacramento and WRNO-FM in New Orleans.

The Jesus Christ Show began as a short segment on KFI's The Bill Handel Show, when Saavedra was invited to play the role of Jesus as a serious guest for an Easter program segment.

== See also ==
- Craig Saavedra, brother of Neil, also a media producer
