= Jump (1999 film) =

1999 full written and directed by Justin McCarthy

Jump is a 1999 film, directed and written by Justin McCarthy, and starring James LeGros, Mark Rosenthal and Jessica Hecht.
