= Rebekah Elmaloglou =

Australian actress (born 1974)

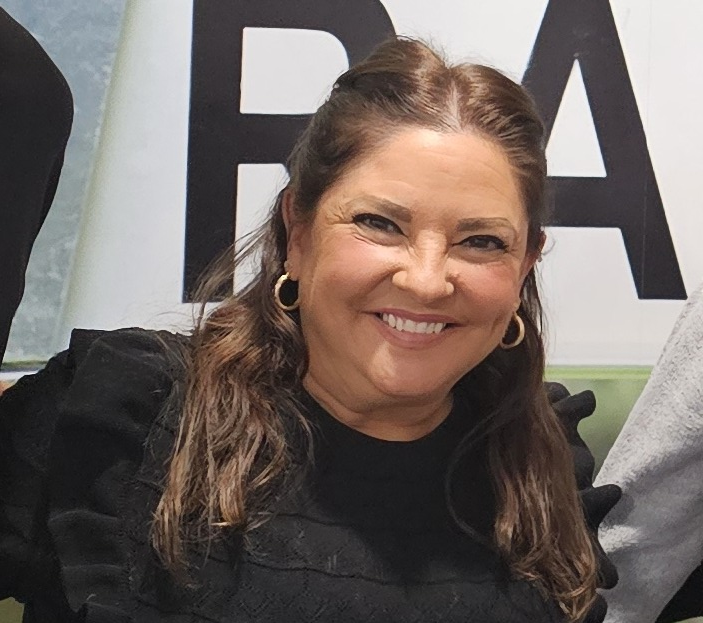
- Born: Rebekah Sophie Elmaloglou; 23 January 1974 (age 52); Paddington, New South Wales, Australia
- Occupation: Actress
- Years active: 1983–present
- Known for: Neighbours (TV series) as Terese Willis; Home and Away (TV series) as Sophie Simpson
- Spouse: Kane Baker (m. 2009)
- Children: 1
- Relatives: Sebastian Elmaloglou (brother); Judi Dench (cousin); Jeffery Dench (cousin)

Rebekah Sophie Elmaloglou (born 23 January 1974) is an Australian actress, known for her roles as teenage tearaway Sophie Simpson on Home and Away and Terese Willis on Neighbours. She also made guest appearances in E Street, A Country Practice and Pacific Drive. Her film appearances include Mad Max Beyond Thunderdome (1985), Princess Kate (1988) and The Sum of Us (1994).

== Early life ==
Elmaloglou was born at the Royal Women's Hospital, Paddington, New South Wales, to a Greek father, Gregory, who was principal cello in the Sydney Symphony Orchestra, and an English mother, Theresa, who was a kindergarten teacher. Her father was born in France. Elmaloglou left school at the age of 15 and trained at the Keane Kids studios in Sydney, where she studied acting, singing and dancing.

== Career ==
Elmaloglou has appeared in numerous roles in various programmes and films such as Mad Max Beyond Thunderdome (1985), Five Times Dizzy (1986) and Jocelyn Moorhouse' debut film The Siege of Barton's Bathroom (1986), Relatives, In Too Deep (also known as Mack the Knife) (1989) and Love in Limbo (1993) plus the 1988 telemovie Princess Kate. In 1989, she had a two-week guest stint as asthmatic street-kid Simone in E Street and immediately followed this with a regular role in Home and Away as Sophie Simpson (1990–1993). She left the soap in late 1992 and travelled to the UK to appear in a production of Cinderella during the pantomime season. She later appeared in a production of Aladdin.

Following Home and Away, Elmaloglou appeared alongside Russell Crowe in the Australian film The Sum of Us (1994), and guest starred in A Country Practice as Christine Agapitos, a love interest for Gavin Harrison's character Hugo Strzelecki. She relished filming The Sum of Us, and compared filming it to Home and Away:

"You feel like you're really acting and really doing something when you do film, because in television you're grinding your way through it. The moment you finish one script you're on to another one, and it just goes on and on and on. (In film) you have more time to work with it – not at it – and you spend more time talking to the director about the role and, yes, your best work comes out of a film and you feel that you can really show your talents as an actress."

In 1994, she appeared on the stage at the Sydney Opera House in Caravan. In a 1995 interview, she stated that she did not receive the offers she had anticipated after leaving Home and Away and that finding work was a struggle. Elmaloglou appeared in Pacific Drive in 1996 as a victim of incest, who dices with death when she turns to drugs. She appeared in an episode of Life Support as a "publicity whore". The actress later posed naked in a Gothic-themed set of photographs for the Australian celebrity nude art magazine Black+White. In 2000, Elmaloglou guest starred in All Saints as Justine Addison, a pregnant women whose husband is injured in a workplace accident.

On 7 February 2013, it was announced that Elmaloglou had joined the cast of Neighbours as Terese Willis, a role she remained in until the show's then-final episode on 28 July 2022. Elmaloglou continued in the part when Neighbours was picked up by Amazon Freevee in 2023.

In January 2026, Elmaloglou was announced as a contestant on the twelfth season of I'm a Celebrity..Get Me Out of Here!. The series was pre-filmed in December 2025. She was eliminated on 18 February 2026, placing fourth overall.

== Personal life ==
Dame Judi Dench is a cousin. Two of Elmaloglou's brothers, Dominic and Sebastian Elmaloglou, have also appeared on Home and Away, plus she has a brother who is a crew member on the show'.

When working on Home and Away (from 1990 to 1993), Elmaloglou frequently had panic attacks. She was later diagnosed with obsessive–compulsive disorder and has been open about her condition.

Elmaloglou has been married to Kane Baker since 2009, and together they have a son born in 2008.

== Filmography ==
=== Film ===
Year	Title	Role	Type
1985	Lorca and the Outlaws (aka Starship or 2084)	Little Girl	Feature film
1985	Relatives	Rebecca	Feature film
1985	Mad Max: Beyond Thunderdome	Gatherer	Feature film
1986	The Siege of Barton's Bathroom	Elly Barton	Short film
1990	In Too Deep	Jojo	Feature film
1993	Love in Limbo		Feature film
1994	The Sum of Us	Jenny Johnson	Feature film
1995	Back of Beyond	Susan MacGregor	Feature film
2007	U-Turn	Car Chick 1	Short film

=== Television ===
Year	Title	Role	Type
1986	Professor Poopsnagle's Steam Zeppelin	Child	1 episode
1986	Five Times Dizzy	Mareka Nikakis	12 episodes
1987; 1993	A Country Practice	Belinda Perkins	2 episodes
1988	Emma: Queen of the South Seas	Young Emma	Miniseries, 2 episodes
1988	Touch The Sun: Princess Kate	May Mathieson	TV film
1988	Fragments of War: The Story of Damien Parer	Helena	TV film
1989	E Street	Simone	4 episodes
1991	Adventures on Kythera	Tik	13 episodes
1991–1993, 2002–2003, 2005	Home and Away	Sophie Simpson	Series regular / guest
1993	A Country Practice	Christina Agapitos	5 episodes
1994	G.P.	Leanne	1 episode
1994	Paradise Beach	Karen Wolfe	1 episode
1996	Pacific Drive	Eliza Garland	1 episode
1999	Water Rats	Christina Mangano	1 episode
2000; 2001	All Saints	Justine Addison	2 episodes
2003	Life Support	Penne's publicity partner	1 episode
2013–2025	Neighbours	Terese Willis	Series regular
2016	Summer Stories	Terese Willis	Web series
2017	Pipe Up	Terese Willis	Webseries
2017	Neighbours vs Time Travel	Terese Willis	Web series
2018	Endless Summer: 30 Years of Home and Away	Sophie Simpson	TV movie
2026	I'm a Celebrity...Get Me Out of Here!	Herself/Contestant	Reality TV series

== Theatre ==
Year	Title	Role	Type
1983	The Sound of Music	Marta	Australian tour
1992	Cinderella	Cinderella	Sunderland Empire Theatre, United Kingdom
1993	Aladdin	Aladdin	De Montfort Hall Leicester, United Kingdom, Inverness, Scotland
1994	Theatresports		
1994	Caravan		Sydney Opera House
1997–98	Wogboys		Enmore Theatre, Sydney, IMB Theatre, Wollongong
2001	The Vagina Monologues		Sydney
