= Beatrice Brumby =

Beatrice Mary Brumby or Beatrice Bell (née Lennon; 8 January 1914 – 31 March 2012) was a pioneering woman from Central Australia and northern South Australia who contributed significantly to the development of the pastoral and tourism industries.

== Early life ==
Brumby was born on 8 January 1914 at Millers Creek in South Australia to Mary Moffatt and Herbert Francis Lennon. Brumby was the second of 12 children. She left school at the age of 14 and began working as a dishwasher at the Oodnadatta Hotel in South Australia in 1928.

== Life in Central Australia ==
Beatrice married Allan Brumby on 11 December 1934 aged 19. Allan Brumby worked for his uncle on a sheep station at Ernabella which is in the Musgrave Ranges in northern South Australia. Their first two children were born at Ernabella. They lived in a hut made of mud and spinifex for three years while at Ernabella which became a Presbyterian Mission in 1938.

Moved back to Oodnadatta when second son was a few months old. She and Allan bought the Hotel Rhynie. They later sold it and managed Vivian Station for two years. The built yards on Macumba, Eringa and Hamilton Stations before returned to Oodnadatta.

They lived in a brush shed at Mt Cavanagh until it was sold. They then bought and ran the Finke Hotel until 1958 before managing Kenmore Station for two years then moved to Gosse Street in Alice Springs.

Brumby was then the cook at the RSL Club in Alice Springs, which was managed by her husband. They also managed Glen Helen Lodge for three years. Allan Brumby died in 1975.

After the death of her first husband, Beatrice married Dick Bell from New Zealand in 1978. Dick was 24 years younger than Beatice. They married at the Memorial Club in Alice Springs.

Together they ran a coffee shop in the Diarama complex until retirement. This shop later became known as BJ's. Beatrice and Dick were together for 33 years and travelled interstate and to New Zealand.

Brumby died on 31 March 2012. At the time of her death she had six remaining children, 17 grandchildren, 33 great-grandchildren and one great-great-grandchild.
