= John Tatoulis =

John Tatoulis is an Australian film and television producer and director.

Tatoulis was the producer of such movies as Take Away, Let's Get Skase and Beware of Greeks Bearing Guns. Tatoulis produced and directed the film The Silver Brumby and later television series The Silver Brumby, which won the Children’s Jury – Best Feature Film award at the 1994 Chicago International Children's Film Festival and Adventures on Kythera. He also produced the animated television series The New Adventures of Ocean Girl.

== Credits ==
Year	Title	Role	Type
1989	In Too Deep	Director	Feature film
1991-92	Adventures on Kythera	Director / Producer	TV series
1993	The Silver Brumby	Director / Producer	Feature film
1996	The Silver Brumby	Producer	TV series
1996	Zone 39	Director	Feature film
2000	Beware of Greeks Bearing Guns (aka Fouvou tous Ellines)	Producer	Feature film
2000	The New Adventures of Ocean Girl	Producer	TV series
2001	Let's Get Skase	Producer	TV film
2001-02	John Callahan's Quads!	Executive producer	TV series
2003	Take Away	Producer	Feature film
2006-11	Dogstar	Creator	TV series
