= The Silver Brumby (TV series) =

Animated series

- Genre: Animated series
- Created by: Elyne Mitchell (original); Jon Stephens and Judy Malmgren
- Developed by: Judy Malgrem
- Directed by: Paul Williams; Magie Geddes; Steve French
- Voices of: John Higginson; Brett Climo; Doug Tremlett; Rhys Muldoon; Stephen Whittaker; Rebecca Gibney; Michael Carman; Marg Downey; Bud Tingwell; Richard Aspel; Edward Hepple; John Stanton
- Opening theme: "Son of the Wind" by Joe Creighton
- Ending theme: "Son of the Wind" (instrumental)
- Composer: Tassos Ioannides
- Country of origin: Australia
- Original language: English
- No. of seasons: 3
- No. of episodes: 39

Production
- Producers: Colin J. South; John Tatoulis
- Running time: 25 minutes
- Production company: Media World Features

Original release
- Network: Nelonen, Network 10
- Release: 29 October 1996 – 17 September 1998

The Silver Brumby is an Australian animated children's television series written by Jon Stephens, Judy Malmgren and Paul Williams, and based on Elyne Mitchell's Silver Brumby books. A total of 39 episodes were produced by Media World Features between 1996 and 1998, and was originally broadcast on Nelonen and Network 10.

== Plot ==
The series focuses on Thowra, a silver colt, his brothers Storm and Arrow and their friends the bush animals in their continued quest to resist the Men's efforts to capture them. The series is loosely based on the books.

== Characters ==
=== Horses ===
- Thowra (voiced by John Higginson (Season 1) and Brett Climo (Seasons 2 and 3)) is the "Silver Brumby", and Yarraman's youngest son. He is calm, kind and brave horse who values his friends. He is often chased by the Man.
- Storm (voiced by Doug Tremlett) is an older brother of Thowra. He is a loyal and kind horse who stands by Thowra's side in the event of trouble. Starting in Season 2, it is presumed that Storm left Thowra's gang to form his own herd, as he is only mentioned and never seen again.
- Arrow (voiced by Rhys Muldoon (Season 1) and Stephen Whittaker (Seasons 2 and 3)) is a chestnut brumby and half-brother of Thowra, and one of the oldest of Yarraman's three sons. Arrow is an arrogant and jealous horse who seeks an opportunity to prove himself better than Thowra, but often gets himself into trouble. Occasionally he will assist Thowra when trouble affects him too. He gets his name from the arrow-shaped marking on his face. It is presumed that Arrow inherited his mean-spirited nature from his mother. According to Benni, there was 'never a mean-spirited mare like her'.
- Boon Boon (voiced by Rebecca Gibney (Season 1) and Marg Downey (Seasons 2 and 3)) is a pretty filly and the Brolga's daughter, who loves Thowra and is his equal on courage, compassion and wisdom.
- Brolga (voiced by John Stanton) is a bitter, pompous and bossy stallion who fiercely protects his herd and does not welcome Thowra or his friends. He fought Yarraman, Thowra's father, and slew him, claiming the title "King of the Cascade Brumbies" in the process.
- Aranda (voiced by Marg Downey) is a paint-colored horse and the Brolga's favourite mare. She often watches the herd while the Brolga is away.
- Yooralla is a young foal who joins Thowra's herd. He became lost from his mother and home herd after a storm. His older sister, Gunda, came to take him home, but he decided to stay with Thowra to continue learning the ways of the wild.
- Yarraman is Thowra, Storm and Arrow's father, former "King of the Cascade Brumbies". His mate was Bel Bel. Eventually the Brolga succeeded him.
- Golden (voiced by Robyn Gibbles (Season 1) and Abbe Holmes (Season 2 and 3)) is a palomino filly, brought to the bush by the Man. She is briefly freed by Thowra, but decides to return home after she is injured by a razorback. She escapes later on after hearing rumours of Thowra's leap to death, then returned to the Man after proving the rumours were false.
- Ebony is the black race horse, who visits the High Country to have a race to beat Thowra.
- Gunda is a young filly and Yooralla's older sister. She came to the High Country to find her brother after he was lost during a storm. After hearing of his decision to stay, she returns to her home herd in the South.
- Narrabri is a young foal in Thowra's herd. He and Yooralla are good friends, and spend time playing together, but they have a tendency to get into trouble while playing. Narrabri is quite a level-headed youngster, as he realizes that they are in trouble before Yooralla, and remembers old advice/sayings during times of trouble. Narrabri and Yooralla are some of the first to encounter the Bun-Yip at Misty Lake.
- Yuri is one of the Brolga's sons. Yuri is a friend of Yooralla's, and sometimes leaves his herd to play with the orphan foal. He does not think much of Thowra, having been brought up to think the Silver Brumby is less than his legend. He too gets into trouble while playing with Yooralla.
- The Prince of the West is a narcissistic and foolish stranger from the West, who comes to the High Country in search of a mate to take back with him. While Thowra is away, and Arrow is left in charge of the herd, he sets his sights on Boon Boon but is unlikely to win the Brolga's approval. He returns home to the West after the Brolga chases him off.
- Boomerang is a young foal from Thowra's gang, and is the only one of the three colts in the gang that escape the capture of the Man.
- Ilinga is an elderly brumby from the South who comes to the High Country in search of Thowra to see if the legends she has heard are true. She wishes to see what Thowra is like and determine if he will make a good King of the Cascade Brumbies.
- Bel Bel is Thowra's mother and former mate of Yarraman. She is seen in the opening credits, and appears to have similar coloring to Thowra and Golden.
- Rocky and Woomera are two colts from Thowra's herd who foolishly follow Arrow when fleeing from a brumby hunt. As a result, they are captured, and become too used to the food given to them by The Man to want to return to the wild.
- Anda is one of the Brolga's daughters. Anda and Moolie caused Aranda to fall over a cliff one day when running away after a snake scare. They go to fetch help to free Aranda.
- Moolie is one of The Brolga's sons. He does not have much luck with snakes, often finding himself a target of them. He and Anda almost cause Aranda a trouble while bolting from a snake.
- Echo is the Man's black horse, who has chased Thowra all over the High Country. It is clear that he respects Thowra in the way he speaks of him. He is loyal to The Man, and is renowned as the strongest, fastest stock horse in the district.
- Snowy is Charlie's white horse.

=== Other animals ===
- Currawong (voiced by Michael Carman) is a sycophantic pied currawong and Brolga's spy who often suffers mistreatment from Brolga or other trouble.
- Wombat (voiced by Michael Carman) is a grumpy, griping wombat who goes on a path without looking ahead and blaming both humans and animals for making his progress difficult. His weakness into helping others is flattery and pestering. He has a wife and two children.
- Mrs. Dingo (voiced by Marg Downey) is a dingo who is a mother of two pups named Bindi and Warri. She is wary of any danger that comes in the bush and has a lot of respect for Thowra.
- Benni (voiced by Bud Tingwell) is a fatherly grey kangaroo and a close friend of Thowra's. He has a wife named Silky and an unnamed daughter. He also narrates the series.
- Mopoke (voiced by Michael Carman) is a wise boobook owl who gives advice to Thowra and his friends but talks in poetic rhyming couplets.
- Eee and Mu (voiced by Richard Aspel and Marg Downey respectively) are a couple of loudmouth emus who gossip and mostly talk to each other.
- Skink is a small green skink who never speaks or makes noise, and is very accident prone.
- Eagle is a wedge-tailed eagle who is occasionally seen as a background character throughout the series. He only spoke briefly in the episode "Seeking A Legend" to Ilinga, and during the latter part of the series, hunts after Currawong.
- Silky (voiced by Marg Downey) is a female grey Kangaroo and Benni's wife.
- Warri and Bindi are Mrs. Dingo's two young pups. The two of them have noses for trouble, but are eager to play with Thowra and the members of his herd. They slowly begin to learn the ways of the High Country to avoid capture by the Trappers that come to hunt Dingos.
- Whip Bird is to Thowra what Currawong is to Brolga. The small green bird comes to tell Thowra what she has heard if it is something of consequence. She is a good-natured creature, though she seems to enjoy baiting Arrow in the same way as Mopoke. She finishes her every sentence with a spirited "WHIP!"
- Kookaburra (voiced by Marg Downey)
- Gang Gangs is a noisy birds from the first few inches of the bush grapevine. Their loud, repetitive cries are usually nothing but gossip. Sometimes they are first to report when danger has arrived in the High Country. At the first sign of danger they fly up into the air crying "DANGER! DANGER! BEWARE! BEWARE! WARNING! WARNING!"
- Benni and Silky's daughter is a young joey who spends a lot of time sitting in Silkie's pouch. She is caught in a dingo trap and injured. The Old Prospector helps her to recover. During her time healing she becomes too used to his ways and is at first reluctant to leave him.
- Mrs. Wombat is married to Wombat.
- Baby Wombats are the two children of Mr. Wombat and Mrs. Wombat.
- Razorback is a vicious feral pig who came to the low country and begun to attack the local animals. He seriously injures Golden's neck but is soon chased into the sea by Mopoke and the Gang Gangs, and his fate afterwards is unknown.
- Lion is an African lion from a circus who was lost because the transport crashed in a storm, and was forced to hunt the local fauna until Thowra tricked him into a pit trap. Thanks to Thowra and the old prospector, the lion returned back to the circus. He seemed fierce but turned out to be soft due to his upbringing in captivity.
- Spider is a house spider who grumbles because some of the brumbies keep messing his webs up.
- Bunyip is a bunyip who dwells on Misty Lake. He looked fierce, but proved to be a dopey, gentle prankster.

=== Humans ===
- The Man (voiced by Richard Aspel) is an unnamed human who spends much of the year in his hut in the High Country. He frequently tries to catch brumbies, particularly Thowra. He rides his own personal black horse named Echo. Despite his urge to catch Thowra, he also comes to respect the Silver Brumby for his elusiveness. He gains a new appreciation for Thowra and Boon-Boon after they free him from an avalanche.
- The Prospector (voiced by Edward Hepple) is a benevolent and wise man who has lived in the bush for a very long time. He pans for gold in the river and aids the animals as often as he can spare.
- Charlie (voiced by Chris Lyons) is Don's son, and the Old Prospector's grandson. He is a kind, plucky boy who loves the bush and animals as much as his grandfather. His personal horse is a white, gray-maned stallion named Snowy.
- The Trappers are a pair of inept men who come to the High Country to trap and shoot animals, particularly Dingos. They end up catching Currawong and Mopoke at some point, but are chased away from their camp afterwards. The Man sets Mopoke and Currawong free. After some time of being lost in the High Country, the Trappers leave, presumably to go hunt animals elsewhere. They briefly returned to recapture the circus lion.
- Don (voiced by Matthew King) is Charlie's father and the Old Prospector's son-in-law. Don is a stockman who comes to the High Country to hunt brumbies. He seems single-minded when it comes to money, and is unable to see Charlie's unhappiness with the way he makes his living. Don and the Old Prospector do not get on very well as they clash over Don's choice to hunt brumbies.
- Charlie's mother is the mother of Charlie, Don's wife and the Prospector's daughter. She never appears and is only mentioned in one episode.
- Bob is a friend of the Man and fellow stockman. He is sometimes involved in brumby hunts in the High Country and uses Dead Horse Hut as a base.
- Anne is a feisty, gentle, and sensible girl who goes skiing on the High Country trails during winter. Along with Tom, she sees Thowra in the snow, and has heard his legends. When Tom is hurt, she follows Thowra and Boon Boon to Dead Horse Hut where she is able to lead the Man back to where Tom is waiting.
- Tom is a youngster who goes skiing in the High Country in winter. He sees Thowra while skiing and decides it would be great if he and Anne managed to catch him, but is injured trying to approach Thowra when he falls down a cliff. He is saved by Thowra and Boon Boon when they lead Anne to find the Man.

== Animation ==
The Silver Brumby is one of the earliest animated TV shows to use digital ink-and-paint for animating as opposed to the traditional usage of cels (which were still being used by other animation production companies at the time).

== Episodes ==
=== Season 1 (1996–97) ===
#	Title	Summary	Air date
1	Friends of the High Country	Thowra befriends Boon Boon. Later he tries to save his small herd from the Man, but he manages to capture two foals. Thowra then gets chased by Brolga, while Arrow left to face his wrath.	29 October 1996
2	Wombats to the Rescue	Determined to prove courage, Arrow tries to rescue the captured foals, but gets himself caught along with Storm by the Man. Thowra convinces the wombats to help them rescue them.	5 November 1996
3	Lost in the Snow	In the middle of winter, two skiing children Tom and Anne fall and get lost in a ravine. Thowra leads Anne to the Man to rescue them.	30 November 1996
4	Flight To Freedom	The Man embarks on a new hunt for the wild horses. With the combined efforts of Boon Boon, Storm, Arrow, Thowra and Brolga they all manage to elude capture.	7 December 1996
5	An Old Prospector Saves a Friend	The Trappers come to shoot dingoes for their tails. The traps they set are a danger to other animals too. A Prospector is giving the animals a helping hand against this threat, especially Benni and Silky's injured daughter.	19 December 1996
6	Benni Returns the Favour	Benni and Silky reclaim their daughter from the Prospector. Thowra gets caught in a chase by the Man barely escaping. Meanwhile, the prospector has a nasty fall and Benni requests Thowra to lead the Man to him.	20 December 1996
7	Racing against the Wind	A racehorse Ebony is encouraged by Currawong to challenge Thowra. Ebony evades the Man but he runs into Brolga. Together Ebony and Thowra escape Brolga and get on good terms.	4 January 1997
8	The Sight of Golden	The Man has brought to the country a Palomino Filly named Golden. This catches the attention of Thowra. With help from Storm, Thowra frees Golden into the wild.	19 January 1997
9	Golden in Trouble	While Golden learns about and enjoys the country and meeting new friends, the Man seeks to reclaim her. Golden is almost cornered by the Man, but Thowra arrives to divert him.	5 March 1997
10	A Wombat on the Road	Men with a bulldozer have come to clear a path, through the high country. An accident diverts the stream. The prospector sorts out the problem and rescues Wombat's missing son.	10 March 1997
11	Fire	The Trappers have returned, but the area catches fire from their camp. Arrow does not take heed and gets trapped, but Thowra rescues him and the emus. The fire is finally out when the rain comes.	20 March 1997
12	Golden Goes Home	A razorback enters the high country. The Man goes out to hunt that boar after it took his cattle. Golden feels vulnerable, so she returns to the Man. The animals manage to drive the boar away.	3 April 1997
13	Seeking a Legend	IIinga seeks the legendary Thowra. Each of Thowra's friends share information about him, while Thowra visits Golden. IIinga angers Brolga into fighting Thowra, but Thowra leads him to fall into a river.	10 April 1997

=== Season 2 (1997) ===
#	Title	Summary	Air Date
14	Spring	Thowra has an odd sensation he is being followed by something. Then Thowra rescues Arrow from Brolga and finds the follower is a lost orphaned foal named Yooralla and he adopts him.	10 September 1997
15	To Catch a Brumby	Thowra raises Yooralla and teaches him about the high country. The Prospector's son captures Boon Boon. Thowra follows their trail down the plains to begin a rescue attempt.	11 September 1997
16	Swimming to Safety	Charlie frees Boon Boon and Thowra leads her back to safety in the High County. After taking refuge on an island in the middle of a fast-flowing river, Thowra and Boon Boon await rescue by Arrow.	12 September 1997
17	A Leap into Legend	Mrs. Dingo's son Warri goes missing and Thowra, Boon Boon and Benni help to look for him. They eventually find the missing dingo pup in a hidden valley. Thowra later uses this valley to evade the Man.	13 September 1997
18	Charlie Heads for the Mountains	After doing his chores, Charlie rides off to meet his grandfather. Charlie is stranded on a cliff ledge, but Thowra summons the Prospector to rescue him.	14 September 1997
19	Charlie Helps a Friend	While trying to follow Thowra during a storm, Yooralla gets into trouble but is rescued by the Old Prospector and his grandson Charlie.	15 September 1997
20	In it Together	Currawong and Mopoke get caught in a trap set by the two trappers.	16 September 1997
21	Trappers Go Home	Thowra and Benni organise the creatures of the High Country to help drive-out the two trappers once and for all.	17 September 1997
22	A Wombat in Trouble	One of Wombat's babies gets knocked over by the Trapper's jeep. Charlie takes him to be cared by his grandfather.	28 September 1997
23	Wombat Goes on a Holiday	The Wombats go on a holiday but goes back to help a new brumby Gunda and save Thowra from Brolga.	18 September 1997
24	Arrow Makes a Friend	Yooralla and Gunda are finally reunited. During a run in with Brolga, Arrow accidentally comes to their rescue.	19 September 1997
25	Arrow Goes South	While Arrow and Yooralla look for a migrating Gunda, the Man is in pursuit. Arrow is almost captured, but manages to shake off the Man.	20 September 1997
26	Golden Returns	Golden returns to the High Country, then escapes and finds Thowra. They then rescue the Trappers who crashed down from a hot air balloon.	21 September 1997

=== Season 3 (1998) ===
#	Title	Summary	Air Date
27	Long Hot Summer	Currawong breaks the Man's mirror, which causes the sun to start a fire. Thowra and his friends rescue Golden with unexpected help from Currawong.	1 August 1998
28	An Unwelcome Stranger	An escaped lion frightens the High Country animals. Thowra gets the lion trapped in a pit, then helps him get home.	3 August 1998
29	Foals in Trouble	Yooralla and Yuri disregard Thowra's warning and get trapped in a flooding gorge, until lightning strikes the dam away. Meanwhile, another lightning causes Currawong and Mopoke to swap bodies temporarily.	5 August 1998
30	The Brolga Wants a Fight	Brolga has to stop his fight with Thowra in order to help Aranda. Mopoke provides Aranda directions to save herself.	10 August 1998
31	Charlie Saves the Brumbies	Arrow returns to the high country. Chased by Brolga, Arrow unwittingly helps Charlie to prevent the Brumbies getting caught.	16 August 1998
32	Emus Get a Break	After a tangle with an Echidna, one of the emus has laid an egg. It turns out to be a gold nugget.	19 August 1998
33	Trapped in the Snow	The man's prized bull breaks loose and rampages across the high country, until Thowra helps the man to catch him.	20 August 1998
34	Youngsters' Winter Woes	Yooralla and Narrabri are trapped in the ice gorge and Wombat is stranded on an ice lake. Thowra comes to their rescue.	25 August 1998
35	An Unexpected Encounter	Arrow is getting flustered from the harsh winter. The prospector gets trapped in his own house buried in snow. Thowra heads south to summon help, which Arrow is in need later.	29 August 1998
36	The Cave of Wonder	After an earthquake occurs, Arrow hides in the waterfall cave from the Man. Thowra learns his destiny as he searches for Arrow. Brolga pursues them but the wombats unwittingly help them.	1 September 1998
37	A Bothersome Nuisance	While Arrow is looking after Thowra's herd, a new ill-mannered brumby from the west wants Boon Boon for a mate. After a run in with the Man, Brolga drives the new brumby away.	9 September 1998
38	Getting Together	Arrow assumes leadership over the herd, taking them to Misty Lake, where some creature lingers and is revealed by Thowra to be a Bunyip. Brolga swears revenge after Currawong informs him.	11 September 1998
39	The Final Encounter	Brolga challenges Thowra hearing that Boon Boon is his mate, which also arouses envy in Arrow. Thowra takes the challenge and eventually emerges victorious and banishes the Brolga from the High Country.	17 September 1998

== Home media ==
The Complete Series 1 DVD was released in 2006, and Volume 1-6 on VHS in 1997 (Australia only) by Roadshow Entertainment. The Animated Adventures of The Silver Brumby is not available to buy on DVD in full. As of April 2011 only the first series has been released in its entirety, with a bonus episode from series two, on Region 4 DVD format. Nine episodes have to date been released on Region 2 format.
