= The Silver Brumby (film) =

- Directed by: John Tatoulis
- Written by: Elyne Mitchell; Jon Stephens
- Based on: Elyne Mitchell
- Produced by: Colin South
- Starring: Russell Crowe; Caroline Goodall; Amiel Daemion; Johnny Raaen; Buddy Tyson
- Narrated by: Caroline Goodall
- Cinematography: Mark Gilfedder
- Edited by: Peter Burgess
- Music by: Tassos Ioannides
- Production companies: Film Victoria; Film Finance Corporation Australia
- Distributed by: Roadshow Entertainment; Barnholtz Entertainment; Media World Features
- Release date: 16 September 1993 (Australia)
- Running time: 93 minutes
- Country: Australia
- Language: English
- Box office: $1,532,649AUD ($996,222USD)

The Silver Brumby (also known as The Silver Stallion or The Silver Stallion: King of the Wild Brumbies in overseas markets such as the United States) is a 1993 Australian drama film-family film, directed by John Tatoulis, and starring actors Caroline Goodall, Russell Crowe and Amiel Daemion. It is based on the Silver Brumby series of novels by Elyne Mitchell.

== Plot ==
A mother tells her daughter a fable about the prince of the brumbies - brumby being a term for the feral horses of Australia - who must find his place amongst his kind, while avoiding The Man who always seems to be hunting him.

The plot shifts to the birth of the titular character. Bel Bel, a wild palomino mare, gives birth to a blonde colt during a nighttime thunderstorm. She names the newborn foal Thowra, after the strong winds that blew that night. His sire, a chestnut stallion named Yarraman, is the leader of their herd.

The herd is under constant threat from being captured by men. One man becomes particularly obsessed with capturing Thowra, who is now a young stallion.

== Cast ==
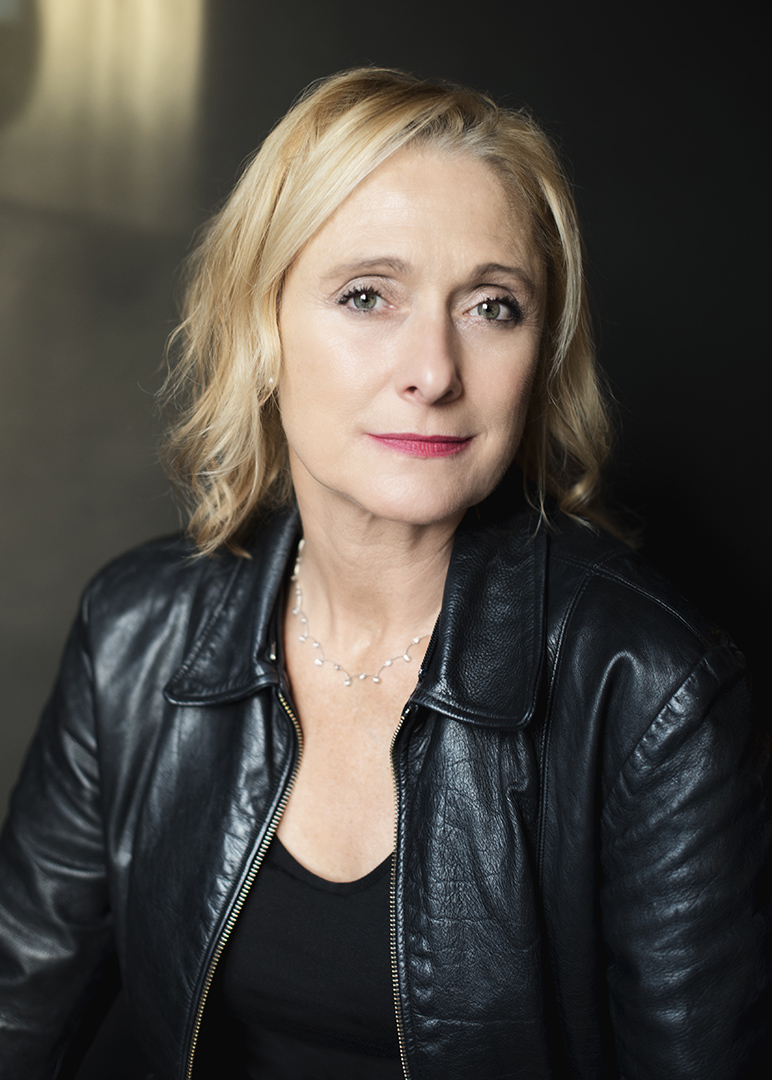
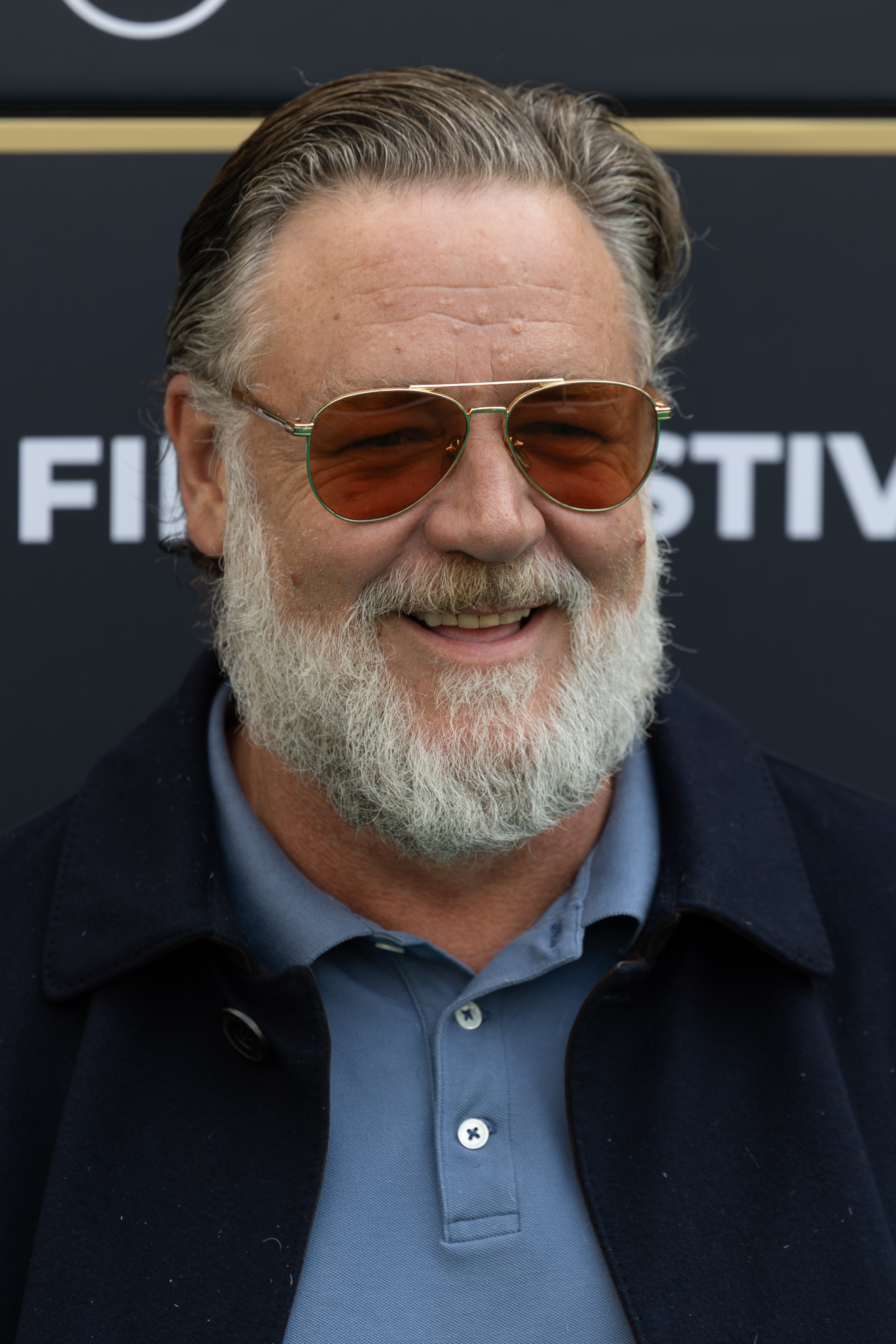
(Left-to-right) Caroline Goodall (pictured in 2016), and Russell Crowe (2025) portrayed Elyne Mitchell and Egan.
- Caroline Goodall as Elyne Mitchell
- Amiel Daemion as Indi Mitchell
- Russell Crowe as The Man / Egan
- Johnny Raaen as Jock
- Buddy Tyson as Darcy
- Graeme Fullgrabe as Auctioneer
- Gary Amos as Rider #1
- Murray Chesson as Rider #2
- John Coles as Rider #3
- Danny Cook as Rider #4
- Peter Faithfull as Rider #5
- Richard Faithfull as Rider #6
- Cody Harris as Rider #7
- Ken Mitchell as Rider #8
- Charles Harris as Rider #9

The animal performers, particularly for the titular silver brumby Thowra, were portrayed by several trained brumbies selected for their striking appearance and agility, allowing authentic depictions of feral horse behavior without delving into detailed training processes. This choice reinforced the film's focus on the majestic yet vulnerable nature of Australia's wild horses, complementing the human cast's grounded performances.

== Production ==
John Tatoulis says that he was attracted to the project because of the spirituality of the Silver Brumby books. The film was shot in the high country of Victoria around Dinner Plain, Mount Hotham, Swindler's Creek and the Blue Ribbon ski area. A hut now known as the Silver Brumby Hut was built as a set prop at Mount Hotham and is now a tourist attraction.

== Release ==
The Silver Brumby opened on 22 screens in Australia and grossed A$153,859 in its opening week, placing ninth at the Australian box office.

=== Home media ===
The film was released in the United States on VHS in 1994 by Paramount Home Video and on DVD in 2004 by Artisan Entertainment.

== Awards ==
=== Won ===
- Australasian Performing Right Association 1994:
  - APRA Music Award - Best Film Score: Tassos Ioannides
- Chicago International Children's Film Festival 1994:
  - Children's Jury Award - Feature Film
- Cinekid Festival 1994:
  - Audience Award - John Tatoulis

=== Nominations ===
- Australian Film Institute 1993:
  - AFI Award - Best Screenplay: John Tatoulis

== See also ==
- List of films about horses
