= Caroline Goodall =

English-Australian actress (born 1959)

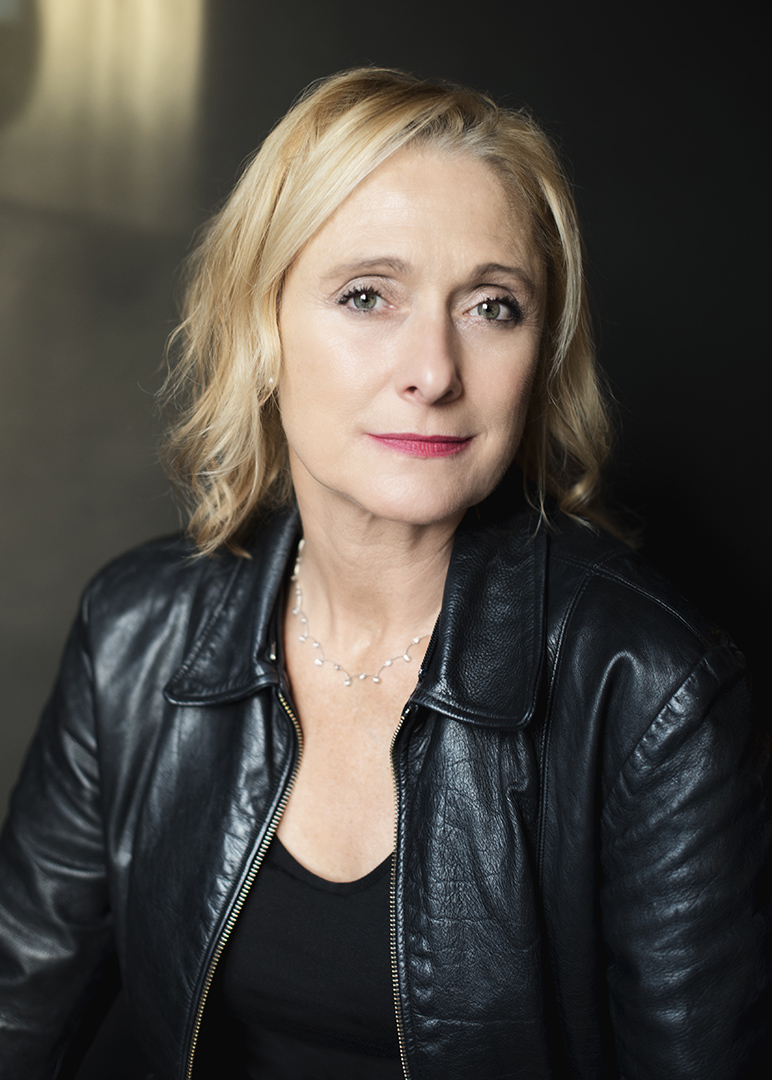
- Goodall interviewed about The Best of Me in 2014
- Born: 13 November 1959 (age 66); London, England
- Education: St Leonards-Mayfield School; Bristol University (B.A., 1981)
- Occupations: Actress, screenwriter, producer
- Years active: 1978–present
- Spouses: Derek Scott Hoxby (m. 1990; div. 1993) Nicola Pecorini (m. 1994)
- Children: 2

Caroline Goodall (born 13 November 1959) is an English–Australian actress, screenwriter and producer. Awards and nominations include Best Actress nominations AFI Awards for her roles in the 1989 miniseries Cassidy and the 1995 film Hotel Sorrento, a Logie Awards Nomination for the mini series A Difficult Woman, and a Best Actress award (Rome Film Festival). Her film appearances include Hook (1991), Cliffhanger (1993), Schindler's List (1993), Disclosure (1994), White Squall (1996), The Princess Diaries (2001) and The Best of Me (2014).

== Early life ==
Goodall was born in London to a publisher father and journalist mother. She attended St Leonards-Mayfield School and graduated in 1981 with a Bachelor of Arts degree in Drama and English from the University of Bristol. Her sister is producer Victoria Goodall.

== Career ==
Goodall appeared extensively on stage, joining the Royal Shakespeare Company (RSC) and then the National Theatre. Her roles for the RSC include Lady Anne in Richard III, Australian tour opposite Sir Anthony Sher and Hypatia in Misalliance; while for the National Theatre she played Rebecca in Command or Promise. She played Juliet in Romeo and Juliet at the Shaw Theatre, Viola In Twelfth Night (Plymouth) starred at the Manchester Royal Exchange, Royal Court Theatre as Susan in Jonathan Gem's comedy Susan's Breasts; Alan Ayckbourn's Steven Joseph Theatre in Scarborough and as Isobel in David Hare's US premiere of The Secret Rapture at the SCR. Goodall has starred in over 80 feature films and TV productions. The only actress to have worked twice with Steven Spielberg, Goodall was cast as Moira Banning in Steven Spielberg's film Hook in 1991 and then as Emilie Schindler in Steven Spielberg's multi-Oscar-winning film Schindler's List (1993). She played Kristel in the Stallone film Cliffhanger (1993), and Susan Hendler in Barry Levinson's Disclosure (1994) opposite Michael Douglas. She co-starred with Russell Crowe in The Silver Brumby in 1993, and was nominated for the AFI Award for Best Actress for her role as Meg in Richard Franklin's 1995 film Hotel Sorrento. She was also nominated for the AFI Award for Best Actress in a TV film or miniseries for the 1989 miniseries Cassidy. She starred opposite Jeff Bridges in Ridley Scott's White Squall (1996) and in the same year starred in the BAFTA-winning BBC miniseries The Sculptress. In 1998, she was nominated for a Logie Award for Best Actress for A Difficult Woman, which also won best TV mini series at the New York Festival in 1998. She played Helen Thermopolis in Garry Marshall's classic The Princess Diaries (2001), The Princess Diaries 2: Royal Engagement (2004), and worked again with Mandy Moore as FLOTUS in Chasing Liberty. She starred opposite Bruce Willis and Henry Cavill in the thriller The Cold Light Of Day (2012). In 2012, she played Doris in PJ Hogan's comedy Mental and in 2015, she played Elsbeth Beaumont in Jocelyn Moorhouse's film The Dressmaker, with Kate Winslet and Judy Davis. Other film roles include POTUS in Hunter Killer (2018) The Hitman's Wife's Bodyguard (2021) and Grace Vessler in Fred and Freddy Macdonald's Sew Torn (2024). European credits include appearances in Urs Egger's Opernball (1998) The Thief Lord (2006), and Denis De La Patelliere's Épées Des Diamants. She appeared in Lars von Trier's Nymphomaniac Vol. II (2013) and won a RIFF Best Actress Award for her role in Massimo Cogliatore's two-hander thriller The Elevator (2014). Other credits include Italian thriller Ferine (2026) and The Wrong People.

As a producer and screenwriter, in addition to writing and producing the independent thriller feature, The Bay of Silence, for Silent Bay Productions/TBOS Film Ltd, starring Claes Bang, Olga Kurylenko and Brian Cox (2020) which sold worldwide, Goodall co-produced Caserta Palace Dream for Gemma Productions/Blue Door SRL; Associate Producer credits: Sew Torn (2024) Casualties (1997) Goodall's writing credits include screen adaptations of Rupert Thomson's Dreams of Leaving for HKM Films and upcoming "Maytime" for Gemma Productions Inc/Silent Bay Productions Ltd

She has appeared in many TV series including as Igraine in The Mists of Avalon, The White Queen (2013) and its sequel The White Princess (2017), portraying Cecily Neville, Duchess of York. In 2016, she portrayed Kelly Frost in the CIA spy-thriller TV series Berlin Station. Other TV credits include Poirot, Midsomer Murders. Alias, CIS, Lady Doris in The Crown (2017), Mayor Charlotte Carmel in Bulletproof (2018); Maggie in Cold Courage (2020);

== Personal life ==
Goodall was first married to American actor-turned-therapist Scott Hoxby, also known as Derek Scott Hoxby. They were married from 1990–1993 before divorcing. She married Nicola Pecorini on 17 September 1994; the couple have two children.

== Filmography ==
=== Film ===
Year	Title	Role	Notes
1986	Every Time We Say Goodbye	Nurse Sally	
1991	Hook	Moira Banning	
1993	Cliffhanger	Kristel	
1993	The Silver Brumby	Elyne Mitchell	
1993	Schindler's List	Emilie Schindler	
1994	Disclosure	Susan Sanders	
1995	Hotel Sorrento	Meg Moynihan	
1996	White Squall	Dr. Alice Sheldon	
1997	Casualties	Annie Summers	
1999	The Secret Laughter of Women	Jenny Field	
2000	Harrison's Flowers	Johanna Pollack	
2001	The Princess Diaries	Helen Thermopolis	
2003	Shattered Glass	Mrs. Duke	
2003	Easy	Sandy Clarke	
2004	Chasing Liberty	Michelle Foster	
2004	The Princess Diaries 2: Royal Engagement	Helen Thermopolis	
2004	Haven	Ms. Claire	
2005	The Chumscrubber	Mrs. Parker	
2005	River's End	Sarah Watkins	
2006	The Thief Lord	Ida Spavento	
2006	We Fight to Be Free	Martha Dandridge Custis	
2008	The Seven of Daran: Battle of Pareo Rock	Lisa Westwood	
2009	My Life in Ruins	Dr. Elizabeth Tullen	
2009	Dorian Gray	Lady Radley	
2012	The Cold Light of Day	Laurie Shaw	
2012	Mental	Doris	
2013	Third Person	Dr. Gertner	
2013	Nymphomaniac	Psychologist	
2014	The Best of Me	Evelyn Collier	
2015	The Daniel Connection	Veronica Ashler	
2015	The Dressmaker	Elsbeth Beaumont	
2016	A Street Cat Named Bob	Mary	
2018	Hunter Killer	President Ilene Dover	
2019	Muse	The Nurse	
2020	The Bay of Silence	Marcia	Also writer and producer
2021	Hitman's Wife's Bodyguard	Crowley	
2021	Birds of Paradise	Celine	
2024	Sew Torn	Grace	
TBA	The Islander	The Baroness	Post-production

=== Television ===
Year	Title	Role	Notes
1978	The Moon Stallion	Estelle Mortenhurze	Main role
1982	Charles & Diana: A Royal Love Story	Ann Bolton	TV film
1985	Gems	Anne-Marie Colman	Regular role (series 1)
1985	Remington Steele	Jenny Buchanan	"Steele Searching: Part 1"
1988	Tales of the Unexpected	Holly Peverill	"Wink Three Times"
1988	Rumpole of the Bailey	Helen Derwent	"Rumpole and the Quality of Life"
1989	After the War	Sally Raglan	TV miniseries
1989	Cassidy	Charlie Cassidy	TV film
1990	4 Play	Marsha	"Madly in Love"
1990	Agatha Christie's Poirot	Lady Yardly	"The Adventure of the Western Star"
1990	Half a World Away	Amy Johnson	TV miniseries
1991	Ring of Scorpio	Helen Simmons	TV film
1991	Quantum Leap	Dr. Leslie Ashton	"The Wrong Stuff"
1993	At Home with the Webbers	Karen James	TV film
1993	The Commish	Maddie Hodges	"Eastbridge Boulevard"
1993	Screen One	Mandy	"Royal Celebration"
1993	Diamond Swords	Liv Gustavson	TV film
1995	Spider-Man	Vanessa Fisk (voice)	"Neogenic Nightmare: Chapters 11 & 12"
1996	The Sculptress	Rosalind Leigh	TV miniseries
1998	Rhapsody in Bloom	Debra Loomis	TV film
1998	Opera Ball	Heather Frazer	TV film
1998	The Outer Limits	Rebecca	"Promised Land"
1998	A Difficult Woman	Dr. Anne Harriman	TV miniseries
1999	Sex 'n' Death	Bella	TV film
2000	Love and Murder	Sally Love	TV film
2000	Trust	Anne Travers	TV film
2001	Murder in Mind	Joanna Liddy	"Neighbours"
2001	The Mists of Avalon	Igraine	TV miniseries
2002	Me & Mrs Jones	Laura Bowden	TV film
2005	CSI: Crime Scene Investigation	Dr. Emily Ryan	"Secrets & Flies"
2005	Alias	Elizabeth Powell	"Bob"
2006	Midsomer Murders	Grace Starkey	"Dead Letters"
2010	Pulse	Juliette Randall	TV film
2011	The Good Wife	Kim Palmieri	"Wrongful Termination"
2012	Mrs Biggs	Muriel Powell	TV miniseries
2013	The White Queen	Cecily Neville, Duchess of York	TV miniseries
2014	Midsomer Murders	Penelope Calder	"The Killings of Copenhagen"
2016	The Crown	Lady Doris	"Pride & Joy"
2016	Berlin Station	Kelly Frost	Recurring role (series 1)
2017	The White Princess	Cecily Neville, Duchess of York	TV miniseries
2018	Endeavour	Lady Bayswater	"Colours"
2018	Bulletproof	Deputy Mayor Charlotte Carmel	Main role
2020	The Trader	Alex Patterson	Main cast
2020	Cold Courage	Maggie	Main cast
