= 1991 in Australia =

- Monarch: Elizabeth II
- Governor-General: Bill Hayden
- Prime minister: Bob Hawke, then Paul Keating
- Population: 17,284,036
- Elections: NSW

The following lists events that happened during 1991 in Australia.

- Decades: 1970s; 1980s; 1990s; 2000s; 2010s
- See also: 1991 in Australian television; 1991 in Australian literature; Other events of 1991; Timeline of Australian history

== Incumbents ==
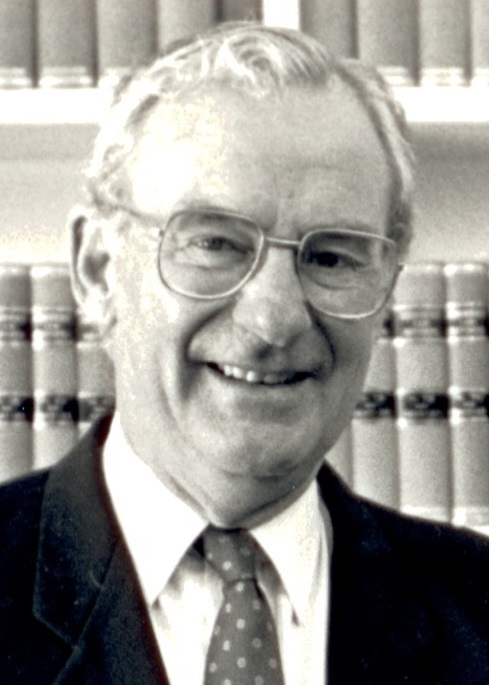
Bill Hayden

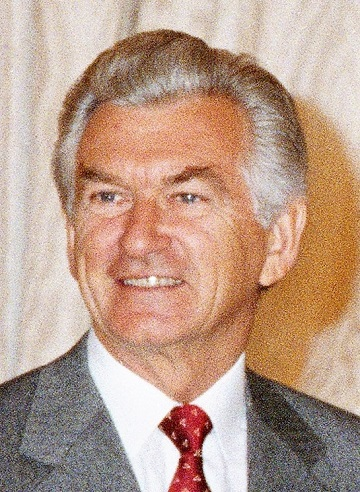
Bob Hawke

Paul Keating

- Monarch – Elizabeth II
- Governor-General – Bill Hayden
- Prime Minister – Bob Hawke (until 20 December), then Paul Keating
  - Deputy Prime Minister – Paul Keating (until 3 June), then Brian Howe
  - Opposition Leader – John Hewson
- Chief Justice – Sir Anthony Mason

=== State and territory leaders ===
- Premier of New South Wales – Nick Greiner
  - Opposition Leader – Bob Carr
- Premier of Queensland – Wayne Goss
  - Opposition Leader – Russell Cooper (until 9 December), then Rob Borbidge
- Premier of South Australia – John Bannon
  - Opposition Leader – Dale Baker
- Premier of Tasmania – Michael Field
  - Opposition Leader – Robin Gray (until 17 December), then Ray Groom
- Premier of Victoria – Joan Kirner
  - Opposition Leader – Alan Brown (until 23 April), then Jeff Kennett
- Premier of Western Australia – Carmen Lawrence
  - Opposition Leader – Barry MacKinnon
- Chief Minister of the Australian Capital Territory – Trevor Kaine (until 6 June), then Rosemary Follett
  - Opposition Leader – Rosemary Follett (until 6 June), then Trevor Kaine (until 21 June), then Craig Duby (until 21 June), then Gary Humphries (until 22 July), then Trevor Kaine
- Chief Minister of the Northern Territory – Marshall Perron
  - Opposition Leader – Brian Ede
- President of the Legislative Assembly of Norfolk Island – David Buffett

=== Governors and administrators ===
- Governor of New South Wales – Peter Sinclair
- Governor of Queensland – Sir Walter Campbell
- Governor of South Australia – Sir Donald Dunstan (until 5 February), then Dame Roma Mitchell
- Governor of Tasmania – Sir Phillip Bennett
- Governor of Victoria – Davis McCaughey
- Governor of Western Australia – Sir Francis Burt
- Administrator of Norfolk Island – Herbert MacDonald
- Administrator of the Northern Territory – James Muirhead

== Events ==
=== January ===
- 1 January – The Australian Securities Commission commences operations, replacing the National Companies and Securities Commission. The new Commission's function includes investigation and enforcement of corporate and securities law.
- 2 January – Warship HMAS Westralia (O 195) leaves for the Persian Gulf.
- 3 January – The musical The Buddy Holly Story premieres in Sydney.
- 4 January – In Melbourne, 35,000 march to demand the resignation of the government.
- 7 January –
  - Flooding in Rockhampton is the worst in 36 years.
  - Australia sends troops to assist the United Nations with the Gulf War.
- 10 January – Australia orders its diplomats out of Baghdad, Iraq.
- 12 January – Six people drown in floods in Queensland.
- 13 January – A Victorian factory which supplies United States Armed Forces is destroyed by fire.
- 14 January –
  - Across the nation, thousands attend church services and protest rallies urging peace.
  - A flood emergency is declared in the Queensland Gulf country.
- 16 January –
  - Widespread flooding isolates Normanton.
  - A Sydney mother is charged with the murder of her baby daughter.
- 17 January –
  - The Gulf War begins, with Prime Minister Bob Hawke giving battle orders to the Navy stationed in the Gulf after a telephone call from President Bush.
  - A siege takes place in Brisbane after an off-duty policeman is taken hostage.
  - The unemployment rate falls to 8.1%
  - Victorian Premier Joan Kirner axes two government departments.
- 18 January – Prime Minister Bob Hawke calls on Israel not to retaliate against Iraq.
- 19 January –
  - Peace marches across Australia demand the withdrawal of Australian forces from the Gulf.
  - A shark attacks a midnight swimmer in a Gold Coast canal.
- 21 January –
  - A mini cyclone leaves a trail of destruction in Sydney.
  - Sydney's Australia Square is evacuated after a parcel bomb scare.
- 22 January – At a special sitting of Parliament, a resolution supporting Australia's commitment to the Gulf War is passed, though 7 Labor MHRs and 3 Senators join the Democrats in opposition.
- 23 January –
  - Fierce storms lash Adelaide and Melbourne
  - Insurance companies react angrily to Federal Treasurer Paul Keating's levy ruling.
  - Billy Joel arrives for his Australian Tour.
- 24 January –
  - An Islamic mosque in Sydney's west is fire bombed.
  - Ford announces plans to retrench 1,600 workers at its Geelong and Broadmeadows factories.
- 25 January – Australia sends Navy divers to join the Gulf task force.
- 26 January –
  - Professor Fred Hollows is named Australian of the Year.
  - The most senior Iraqi diplomat in Australia is asked to leave.

=== February ===
- 2 February – Public Service criticism of the Public Service Management Commission erupts in mass demonstrations in Queensland.
- 8 February – In a move to distance himself from the beleaguered Gray, Ray Groom resigns as Tasmanian Deputy Leader, citing fundamental disagreements with his leader. Peter Hodgman replaces him.
- 10 February – The South Australian Government announces its first $1 billion bail-out of the State Bank of South Australia.
- 12 February – South Australian Premier John Bannon is forced to agree to the setting up of a Royal Commission into the State Bank of South Australia under Mr. Justice Sam Jacobs.
- 14 February – the bulk carrier Sanko Harvest sinks off the coast of the Western Australian town of Esperance, leaking 700 tonnes of bunker oil and 30,000 tonnes of fertiliser into the surrounding waters near the Recherche Archipelago.
- 20 February – Democrat Ian Gilfillan reveals in South Australian Parliament Westpac's leaked "Swiss Loans" letters on the bank's controversial foreign currency loans.

=== March ===
- 21 March – Richard Jones declares Democrats' support for New South Wales Premier Nick Greiner's reform of the Legislative Council, ensuring passage of the legislation.
- 23 March – In a surprise result, Brisbane's Liberal Lord Mayor Sallyanne Atkinson loses the Brisbane City Council election, 1991 to political novice Jim Soorley, an ex-priest from the Gold Coast.

=== April ===
- 2 April – New South Wales Premier Nick Greiner makes an address to the National Press Club of Australia in which he criticises Federal Treasurer Paul Keating, accusing him of dragging the chain on microeconomic reform and claiming that Keating's apparent lack of interest in fixing Federal-State financial relations may thwart attempts to lower inflation.
- 4 April – Prime Minister Bob Hawke announces that a Telecom proposal to increase the price of local phone calls by 2 cents to 24 cents and increase business charges may be accepted provided they were below the Consumer Price Index.
- 7 April – Prime Minister Bob Hawke rebukes Employment, Education and Training Minister John Dawkins during a Cabinet meeting over a speech he made the day before, in which he called for a review of the floating exchange rate, in direct opposition to the Government's policy on the issue. Dawkins also suggested that the Government's pursuit of low inflation may have to be sacrificed in the interests of stabilising the exchange rate. The Prime Minister warns the other ministers that they will face the same fate if they speak on issues outside their normal portfolio responsibilities.
- 11 April – Prime Minister Bob Hawke volunteers to give evidence to the WA Inc Royal Commission and announces that the former West Australian Premier Brian Burke will return from Ireland next week to testify to the Commission. Mr. Hawke also reverses his earlier categorical denial, given repeatedly in Parliament during the week, that there had been discussion of a gold tax at a lunch with Mr Burke, the failed merchant banker Laurie Connell, Alan Bond and others on 15 June 1987. In evidence before the Royal Commission, Laurie Connell said he received an assurance from the Prime Minister that the Government would not introduce a new gold tax, and that he subsequently donated $250,000 to the Labor Party.
- 15 April – The Australian Industrial Relations Commission hands down a national wage decision which will give Australia's 7 million workers a 2.5% pay rise. Federal Treasurer Paul Keating joins with the ACTU in condemning the decision which rejects the Accord agreement on wages for the first time since the Hawke Government came to power in 1983. The Commission also rejects Accord proposals for a more flexible wage system.
- 17 April – The bulk carrier MV Mineral Diamond disappears of the coast of Western Australia. The vessel is believed to have been sunk during adverse conditions caused by Cyclone Fifi.
- 25 April – Prime Minister Bob Hawke secures a compromise agreement with the Australian Council of Trade Unions (ACTU) to end the stalemate on waterfront reform and fix a timetable for pay rises to stevedores linked to the Accord Mark VI. Mr Hawke proposes a two-year contract for waterside workers that would allow a $12-a-week rise from 16 May and further average rises of 4 per cent in exchange for new job classifications.
- 26 April – The jury in the Sir Leslie Thiess trial finds that the construction and mining magnate had bribed Sir Joh Bjelke-Petersen to win government contracts, as well as cheating his companies' shareholders.
- 30 April –
  - Federal Treasurer Paul Keating intensifies speculation about a change of leadership of the Labor Party by saying publicly that the Labor Party could not demand to have both him and Prime Minister Bob Hawke in the Government at the time of the next election.
  - New South Wales Attorney-General John Dowd resigns after failing to get an assurance from Premier Nick Greiner that he would retain that position after the election.

=== May ===
- 9 May – The report of the Royal Commission into Aboriginal Deaths in Custody is released. No criminal charges were recommended, nor was compensation for victims' families, but changes were recommended to the way that Aboriginal people were dealt with in police custody.
- 11 May – Kevin Andrews wins the 1991 Menzies by-election for the federal seat of Menzies following the retirement of Liberal Deputy Leader Neil Brown.
- 23 May – Protesters storm Parliament House, Brisbane, angry at the Labor Caucus' approval for legislation giving Aborigines limited land rights but restricting their claims to less than 3% of Queensland.
- 25 May – The state election in New South Wales produces a hung parliament. The ruling Liberal/National coalition government of Nick Greiner manages to form a minority government with the support of four Independent MPs.
- 30 May – A television report reveals that Prime Minister Bob Hawke made a secret deal in 1988, known as the "Kirribilli agreement", to hand over the Australian Labor Party (ALP) leadership at a suitable time after the 1990 federal election to Paul Keating.

=== June ===
- 3 June –
  - After the secret deal emerged, Paul Keating makes his first challenge against Bob Hawke for the Australian Labor Party leadership. Hawke wins 66–44, and Keating resigns as Treasurer the same day. Brian Howe becomes Deputy Prime Minister and John Kerin becomes Treasurer. Simon Crean is promoted to the position of Primary Industry Minister.
  - The Federal Government's monthly deficit blows out to more than 1.2 billion dollars.
  - Warner Bros. Movie World holds a grand opening, Mel Gibson, Kurt Russell and Goldie Hawn were those in attendance.
- 24 June–27 June – The Australian Labor Party Centenary Conference is held in Hobart.

=== July ===
- 4 July – Leading Sydney heart surgeon Dr. Victor Chang is shot and killed near his home in the Sydney suburb of Mosman. His murder is the result of a bungled kidnapping and extortion attempt.
- 30 July – A special Premiers' Conference produces an in-principle agreement to devolve to the states greater taxing power and service responsibilities.

=== August ===
- 2 August – The Palm Grove Hostel fire kills 12 people in Dungog, New South Wales.
- 5 August – Former Queensland Police Commissioner Terry Lewis is sentenced to 14 years in prison for corruption.
- 17 August – Strathfield massacre: Wade Frankum kills seven people, mostly women, in a killing spree in Strathfield Plaza in Sydney.
- 19 August – Australian Democrats Leader Janet Powell is dumped by a vote of 6 of the 8 Senators, following a petition from members.
- 20 August – John Kerin delivers his first Federal Budget.
- 23 August – New South Wales Democrats Senator Paul McLean resigns from the Senate, later replaced by Karin Sowada.

=== September ===
- 15 September – Federal Opposition Leader John Hewson re-affirms a consumption tax (Goods and Services Tax), as integral to the Coalition's electoral strategy, despite Tim Fischer's public doubts about its saleability.
- 24 September – The trial of former Queensland Premier Sir Joh Bjelke-Petersen begins in Brisbane.
- 27 September – A fall of 3.2 millimetres or 0.13 inches ends Brisbane's longest-ever rainless spell of 64 consecutive days, with the previous rain in the city having fallen on 24 July.

=== October ===
- 2 October – A 60 Minutes interview with John Hewson's former wife and three children helps to damage his political standing.
- 19 October – The perjury trial of former Premier of Queensland Sir Joh Bjelke-Petersen ends in a hung jury 10:2. Prosecutors decide against a retrial on the basis of Joh's advancing age and divided public opinion.
- 22 October – Paul Keating addresses the National Press Club of Australia, continuing his attacks on Prime Minister Bob Hawke's "new federalism".
- 23 October – The first general strike in Australia in 65 years takes place in New South Wales.
- October to December – The world's largest blue-green algal bloom takes place on the Darling River, and after the deaths of over a thousand livestock, leads the New South Wales Government to declare a state of emergency.

=== November ===
- 11 November – Joan Sheldon successfully challenges Denver Beanland to become leader of the Queensland Liberal Party.
- 20 November – After weeks of successive leaks, the full text of the Coalition's Fightback! (policy) is released, the day before its official launch. Initial reaction from business and financial interests is positive, and Labor is caught unprepared.

=== December ===
- 6 December – John Kerin, unable to sell the Budget or counter Fightback! is sacked as Federal Treasurer and replaced by Ralph Willis.
- 9 December – Queensland Opposition Leader Russell Cooper announces that he is under investigation for the funding of a trip to Hamilton Island with his wife and that he has refunded the cost of the trip. He stands down as National Party Leader and is replaced by Rob Borbidge.
- 15 December – Russell Cooper and Joan Sheldon announce that the Queensland Nationals and Liberals will co-operate in order to reduce the conflict over the new seats before the next election.
- 16 December – After a week of intense pressure, Prime Minister Bob Hawke is informed by a Button-led delegation that he no longer has the confidence of the Labor Party.
- 19 December – Paul Keating makes his second Labor leadership challenge. This time, he wins 56–51 and becomes Australia's 24th Prime Minister the next day.
- 20 December – Barely a year after starting up, Compass Airlines Mk I is shut down. The shutdown is somewhat controversial, coming shortly before the peak Christmas travelling period and coming about partially as a result of debts owed to a government authority.
- 25 December – Prime Minister Paul Keating announces his Federal Cabinet, with John Dawkins as Treasurer.

== Arts and literature ==
- Cloudstreet adapted for the stage by Nick Enright and Justin Monjo, the theatrical adaptation opened in Sydney under the direction of Neil Armfield. Seasons followed in Perth, Melbourne, London, Dublin, New York and Washington, D.C.
- David Malouf's novel The Great World wins the Miles Franklin Award

== Film ==
- Death in Brunswick
- Dingo
- Flirting
- Proof

== Television ==
- January – Network Ten relaunches with a new logo, which was used until 31 October 2018, after its sale by CBS.
- 10 February – American animated comedy series The Simpsons debuts on Network Ten.
- 31 December – The Northern New South Wales television market is aggregated, with Prime Television taking a Seven Network affiliation, NBN taking a Nine Network affiliation & NRTV (now Southern Cross Ten) taking a Network Ten affiliation.

== Sport ==
- 2 January – Australian Nicole Provis loses in the Danone Women's Open Tennis Championship.
- 3 January – Jana Novotina is out of the Danone Women's Open Tennis Championship.
- 4 January – The last remaining player Rachel McQuillan is out of the Danone Women's Open.
- 5 January – The Danone Women's Open is delayed due to rain.
  - Greg Matthews puts Australia on top in the Third Ashes Test.
- 6 January – Czech player Helena Sukova wins the Danone Women's Hard Court Championship.
- 7 January – Hayley Lewis makes it into the finals of the World Swimming Championships.
- 26 January – Monica Seles becomes the youngest winner of the Australian Open Tennis Championship.
- 27 January – Boris Becker beats Ivan Lendl in the Australian Open Tennis Championship and takes the world's top ranking.
- 22 February – First day of the Australian Track & Field Championships for the 1990-1991 season, which are held at the ES Marks Athletics Field in Sydney. The combined events were conducted in Perth on 22 and 23 March, while the relays were conducted at Hobart on 6 January 1991.
- 22 March – The Adelaide Crows play their first game in the AFL. In front of a sellout crowd at Football Park, they defeat Hawthorn 24.11.155 to 9.15.69
- May – South Melbourne, managed by legendary Hungarian Ferenc Puskás, defeat Melbourne Croatia on penalties after a thoroughly entertaining 1–1 draw in the National Soccer League Grand Final at Olympic Park.
- 2 June – Carlton go within thirty seconds of becoming the first goalless team in the VFL/AFL since 1961 and only the second since 1921. Mark Arceri kicks a goal from a free kick with 33 seconds remaining.
- 3 June – England soccer team scores a one-nil victory over Australia.
- 21 July – Sean Quilty wins his first men's national marathon title, clocking 2:14:59 in Brisbane, while Karen Gobby claims the women's title in 2:36:42.
- 22 September – Minor premiers Penrith Panthers defeat Canberra Raiders 19–12 to win the 84th NSWRL premiership. It is the first premiership for Penrith, who had been trying since 1967 to win one. Raiders lock Bradley Clyde is awarded the Clive Churchill medal for man of the match, becoming the only player to win the award twice until 2017. Gold Coast Seagulls finish in last position, claiming the wooden spoon.
- 28 September – Hawthorn (20.19.139) defeat the West Coast Eagles (13.8.86) to win the 95th VFL/AFL premiership. It's the last grand final not played at the Melbourne Cricket Ground until 2020, it was played at Waverley Park instead as the MCG was being renovated.
- 2 October – NSWRL premiers Penrith Panthers are defeated by RFL Championship winners Wigan 21–4 in the 1991 World Club Challenge, held in Liverpool, England.
- 2 November The Wallabies beat England in the Rugby World Cup final 12–6^ at Twickenham

^-Scored under outdated scoring system.

== Births ==
- 2 January – Steele Sidebottom, footballer
- 7 January – Michael Walters, Australian rules footballer
- 8 January – Josh Jackson, rugby league player
- 1 February – Blake Austin, rugby league player
- 11 February – Shanina Shaik, model
- 13 February – Junior Roqica, Australian-Fijian rugby league player
- 5 March – Hanna Mangan-Lawrence, actress
- 14 March – Rhiannon Fish, Canadian-born actress
- 15 March – Kurt Baptiste, rugby league player
- 20 March – Ethan Lowe, rugby league player
- 26 March – Jack Watts, Australian rules footballer
- 2 April – Luke Jones, rugby player
- 14 April – James Frecheville, actor
- 17 April – Tessa James, actress
- 23 April – Paul Vaughan, rugby league player
- 23 May – Sam Masters, speedway rider
- 25 May – Joe Robinson, musician
- 1 June – Sally Peers, tennis player
- 7 June
  - Olivia Rogowska, tennis player
  - Gary Rohan, footballer
- 23 June – Damien Cook, rugby league player
- 26 June – Dustin Martin, footballer
- 23 July – Lauren Mitchell, gymnast
- 24 July – Penelope Mitchell, actress
- 30 July – Taylor Glockner, actor
- 12 August – Jesinta Campbell Franklin, model
- 17 August – Michael Hepburn, cyclist
- 27 August – Alex Carey, cricketer
- 19 September – Demelza Reveley, model
- 9 October –Tyson Frizell, Australian-Welsh rugby league player
- 17 October –
  - Gabriella Cilmi, singer
  - Joseph Dare, footballer
- 20 October – Mitchell Marsh, cricketer
- 8 November – Jason Waterhouse, sailor
- 18 November – Ahmed Kelly, Paralympic swimmer
- 28 November – Stephanie Wood, netball player
- 10 December – Thomas Oar, soccer player
- 19 December – Keiynan Lonsdale, actor
- 20 December – Isabel Durant, actress
- 27 December – Sam Reid, Australian rules footballer
- 30 December - Max Gawn, Australian rules footballer

== Deaths ==
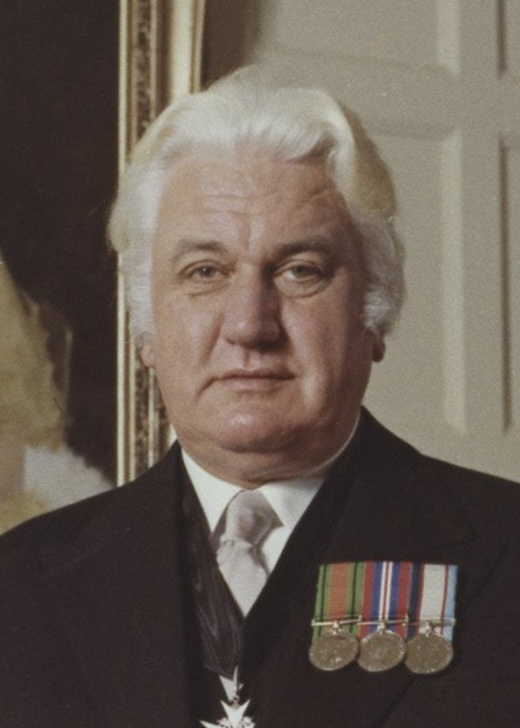
Sir John Kerr

- 12 January – Sir Robert Jackson, public servant and United Nations administrator (died in the United Kingdom) (d. 1991)
- 14 January – Gordon Bryant, Victorian politician (b. 1914)
- 9 March – Ralph Green, Australian rules footballer (Carlton) (b. 1911)
- 11 March – Hector Crawford, Australian television producer (b. 1913)
- 24 March – Sir John Kerr, 18th Governor-General of Australia (b. 1914)
- 23 May – Manning Clark, historian (b. 1915)
- 14 June – Vladimir Petrov, defected Soviet spy (born in Russia) (b. 1907)
- 29 June
  - Sheree Beasley, murdered schoolgirl (b. 1985)
  - Russ Hinze, Queensland politician (b. 1919)
- 4 July – Victor Chang, cardiac surgeon (born in China) (b. 1936)
- 14 July – Ian Dougald McLachlan, military officer (b. 1911)
- 7 October – Darren Millane, Australian rules footballer (Collingwood) (b. 1965)
- 28 December – Cassandra Harris, actress (died in the United States) (b. 1948)

== See also ==
- 1991 in Australian television
- List of Australian films of 1991
