= List of Australian films of 1991 =

List of Australian films of 1991 contains a detailed list of films created in Australia in 1991

== 1991 ==
| Title | Director | Cast | Genre | Notes |
|---|---|---|---|---|
| The Aberrant | Brent Houghton | Mark Reid, Tim Houghton | Short | |
| Ali Baba | Douglas Richards, Richard Slapczynski | Caz Adams, Robert Mack, Gennie Nevinson | Animation/Adventure/Comedy | aka: "Burbank's ACT I: Ali Baba" |
| Antarctica | John Weiley | Alex Scott | Short documentary | |
| As Happy as Larry | Riju Ramrahka | Max Cullen, Tony Harvey | Short | |
| Bad News Bachelors | Franco di Chiera | Nicholas Papademetriou | Short | |
| Behind the Mask | Frank Martin | John Fitzpatrick, Brenda Bruce, Jackson Burns | Documentary | |
| Black Robe | Bruce Beresford | Lothaire Bluteau, Sandrine Holt, Aden Young | Adventure/ Drama/ History | Feature film |
| Born to Shop | Sarah Gibson | Julie McCrossin | Documentary | |
| DAAS: The Edinburgh Years | Cameron P. Mellor | Paul McDermott, Tim Ferguson, Richard Fidler | Comedy | |
| Dead to the World | Ross Gibson | Lynette Curran, John Doyle, Tibor Gyapjas | Action / Drama | Feature film |
| Deadly | Esben Storm | Jerome Ehlers, Frank Gallacher, Lydia Miller, Caz Lederman | Crime | Feature film |
| Death in Brunswick | John Ruane | Sam Neill, Zoe Carides, John Clarke | Comedy | Feature film |
| Dingo | Rolf de Heer | Colin Friels, Miles Davis | Drama | Feature film; Co-production with France |
| Dusty Hearts | Pauline Chan | | Short | |
| The Emperor's New Clothes | Richard Slapczynski | Caz Adams, Claire Crowther, Alistair Duncan (Note: Perhaps the voice artist Alastair Dundan) | Animation | |
| Fantastic Futures | Pip Karmel | | Short | |
| Fantasy | Geoffrey Brown, Derek Strahan | Colin Borgonon, Clare Chilton, Jane Darley-Jones | Thriller | Feature film |
| Flirting | John Duigan | Noah Taylor, Thandiwe Newton, Nicole Kidman | Drama | Feature film |
| Frank Enstein | | Laura Gabriel, Alan Glover, David Nettheim | Animation | |
| Goldilocks and the Three Bears | | Claire Crowther, Joanna Moore, Lee Perry | Animation | |
| The Good Woman of Bangkok | Dennis O'Rourke | Yagwalak Chonchanakun | Drama | |
| Gotcha | Howard Rubie | Daniel D'Amico, Melissa Trovato, Barbara Magnolfi | Short | |
| Greenhouse | Sarah Watt | | Short | |
| Hans and the Silver Skates | | Ric Herbert, Juliet Jordan, Robert Mack | Animation | |
| Holidays on the River Yarra | Leo Berkeley | Craig Adams, Luke Elliot, Alex Menglet, Claudia Karvan | Drama | Screened at the 1991 Cannes Film Festival |
| Hunting | Frank Howson | John Savage, Kerry Armstrong, Guy Pearce | Drama | Feature film |
| Isabelle Eberhardt | Ian Pringle | Mathilda May, Peter O'Toole, Tcheky Karyo | Biography / Drama | Feature film; Co-production with France |
| Luke's Party | Tim Burns, Ros Sultan | | Short | |
| The Magic Riddle | Yoram Gross | Robyn Moore, Keith Scott | Animation | |
| My Tiger's Eyes | Teck Tan | | Short | |
| No Worries | David Elfick | Amy Terelinck, Geoff Morrell, Susan Lyons | Feature film | |
| On My Own | Antonio Tibaldi | Matthew Ferguson, Judy Davis | Drama | aka: "Il colore dei suoi occhi" |
| Placenta | James Ferguson | Jeremy Sims, Danielle Long, John Paramor | Short | |
| Proof | Jocelyn Moorhouse | Hugo Weaving, Russell Crowe, Genevieve Picot, Heather Mitchell | Drama | Feature film |
| Puss in Boots | Richard Slapczynski | Ric Herbert, Rachel King, Lee Perry | Animation | |
| Resonance | Stephen Cummins | Andrea Aloise, Mathew Bergan, Chad Courtney | Short | |
| See Jack Run | Stephen Amis | Trent Mooney, Molly Brumm, Ellisa Holloway | Drama | |
| Sexual Healer | Aja | Kelly Blue, Mel Bourne, Tom Byron | Adult | |
| Stan and George's New Life | Brian McKenzie | Paul Chubb, Julie Forsyth, John Bluthal | Drama | Feature film |
| Sweet Talker | Michael Jenkins | Bryan Brown, Karen Allen | Comedy | Feature film |
| Until the End of the World | Wim Wenders | Solveig Dommartin, William Hurt, Sam Neill | Drama / Science-fiction | aka: "Bis ans Ende der Welt" |
| Waiting | Jackie McKimmie | Noni Hazlehurst, Deborra-Lee Furness | Drama | Feature film |
| A Woman's Tale | Paul Cox | Sheila Florance, Gosia Dobrowolska | Drama | Feature film |

== See also ==
- 1991 in Australia
- 1991 in Australian television
