= 1991 in Australian television =

== Events ==
=== January ===
- 2 January – British sitcom Mr. Bean starring Rowan Atkinson premieres on the ABC.
- 13 January – Network Ten undergoes a major rebrand, launching as "The Entertainment Network" and introducing a new logo, which remained in use until October 2018.
- 17 January – Seven Network's long running breakfast program Sunrise makes its first broadcast.
- 22 January – Australian sitcom All Together Now premieres on Nine Network.

=== February ===
- 8 February – French-American-Canadian animated series Inspector Gadget ends its afternoon run on ABC. The series will later shift to air on Sunday mornings on 22 December of that year.
- 10 February – The Simpsons makes its debut on Network Ten at 7:30 pm with the first season episode, 'Bart the Genius'.
- 11 February – The ABC premieres the sitcom Eggshells starring Garry McDonald.

=== March ===
- March – Tony Barber and Alyce Platt announced that they will quit hosting the quiz show Sale of the Century.
- 15 March – Steve Vizard wins the 1991 Gold Logie.
- 16 March – The producers of soap opera Neighbours have reported that star Beth Buchanan (sister of ex-Hey Dad star Simone) is going to leave the series when her contract expires in June.
- 17 March – ABC debuts a new Sunday morning children's wrapper program called Couch Potato presented by Australian actor Grant Piro.
- 19 March – Australian children's series Johnson and Friends premieres in New Zealand on TVNZ's Channel 2 as part of the After 2 children's block.

=== April ===
- 6 April – Network Ten's troubled soap opera Neighbours is set to lose a record number of cast members as many of them have contract renewals coming up. Ian Williams, who plays medical student Adam Willis, is confirmed to be leaving, while co-star Lucinda Cowden who plays Melanie Pearson is also believed to be quitting when their contracts expire.
- 22 April – Glenn Ridge and Jo Bailey replace Tony Barber and Alyce Platt on Sale of the Century.
- 30 April – ABC's live comedy series The Big Gig returns with a new series.
- 6 April – Network Ten's soap opera Neighbours is set to lose more than twenty-five actors, along with two-hundred crew people. They are being terminated from their roles as part of a revamp. Among the leaving actors are Ian Smith (Harold Bishop), Lucinda Cowden (Melanie Pearson), Stefan Dennis (Paul Robinson), Gayle and Gillian Blakeney (Caroline & Christina Aleesi), Mark Little (Joe Mangel), Kristian Schimid (Todd Landers), Jeremy Angerson (Josh Anderson), Beth Buchanan (Gemma Ramsay), Amelia Frid (Cody Willis), Ben Guerens (Toby Mangel), Miranda Fryer (Sky Bishop) and Ian Williams (Adam Willis). Joining the series will be former Cleo covergirl of the year Rachel Blakely and former models Scott Michaelson and Andrew Williams.

=== May ===
- 13 May – Triple J presenter and radio announcer Michael Tunn takes over as presenter of the Australian weekday magazine series The Afternoon Show.
- 15 May – Canadian teen drama series Degrassi High, the third in the Degrassi trilogy series makes its debut on ABC.
- 30 May – Australian sitcom All Together Now premieres in New Zealand, screening on Channel 2.
- 30 May – A spinoff of the Australian comedy series Hey Dad...! called Hampton Court airs on Seven Network running for only one season and a total of thirteen episodes. It was later axed after the final episode on 22 August.

=== June ===
- 1 June – Reruns of the classic ABC drama series Patrol Boat are now airing on Network Ten.
- 3 June – Neighbours premieres in America, airing on KCOP-TV in Los Angeles, CA. Two weeks later, the series debuts on WWOR-TV, New York.
- 10 June – British children's animated series Postman Pat and Tugs premiere on ABC.
- 15 June – Hey Hey It's Saturday begins airing on Channel 2 in New Zealand.
- 24 June – ABC debuts its new children's game show Big Square Eye hosted by ex-Neighbours star Bob La Castra.

=== July ===
- 4 July – British long running soap opera series EastEnders airs on ABC for the very last time due to the show not getting any more episodes from the UK where it originally came from, although it was later repeated on UKTV on cable television.
- 16 July – Australian live comedy series The Big Gig airs its final episode on ABC.
- 19 July – Ron Casey and Normie Rowe receive a massive punch-up live on Midday with Ray Martin. In Neighbours, Harold Bishop has had a massive heart attack in the Coffee Shop.
- 30 July – Johnson and Friends makes it debut in the UK on the BBC.

=== August ===
- 9 August – Final episode of the Australian children's sitcom Pugwall screens on Nine Network.
- 13 August – Australian children's series Adventures on Kythera premiers on the Nine Network, its first broadcast in Australia. The series debuted in the UK and Ireland two years ago.
- 15 August – American talk show The Oprah Winfrey Show makes its debut on Network Ten as a late-night program.

=== September ===
- 7 September – Neighbours star Richard Huggett, who plays Jim Robinson's half-son Glen Donnelly has told producers that he will not be renewing his contract when it expires in November. He will be seen on air until February 1992.
- 7 September – Johnson and Friends premieres in South Africa on M-Net as part of their children's block K-T.V..
- 19 September – Network Ten's shamed soap opera Neighbours airs a tragic episode: Joe Mangel proposes to Melanie Pearson announce they will immigrate to the UK, Adam Willis leaves Ramsay Street for Europe, Harold Bishop is murdered off the coast while on holidays with Madge to Tasmania – this was the final episode.

=== October ===
- 25 October – In Neighbours, Joe Mangel, Melanie Pearson and Sky Bishop depart.
- 30 October – The second series of Johnson and Friends debuts at 4:30pm on ABC.

=== November ===
- 5 November – The hit long running British science fiction series Doctor Who returns on ABC after a long absence since its last air in mid 1990, starting off with the fourth serial of Season 17 Nightmare of Eden and ending with the seventh and final serial of Season 18 Logopolis in early 1992. A convention of the series is also being held at the local Noah's on the Beach hotel in Newcastle, New South Wales.
- 6 November – Star Trek: The Next Generation, a sequel to the American science fiction television series in the Star Trek franchise, premieres on the Nine Network and is shown every Wednesday at 7:30pm.
- 6 November – Johnson and Friends begins airing in Ireland on RTÉ Network 2 as part of The Den, a wrap-around programme for children.

=== December ===
- December – The Seven Network wins the 1991 ratings year with a record of 33.8% share for Total People. This is the fifth consecutive year the network had won in primetime.
- 3 December – American sitcom The Fresh Prince of Bel-Air starring American rapper Will Smith makes its debut on Nine Network. American teen sitcom Parker Lewis Can't Lose also debuts on Nine on the same day.
- 19 December – Australian children's television series Johnson and Friends is sold to television markets across Canada for the first time ever. The first television channel to air the series in Canada was Knowledge Network in British Columbia.
- 22 December – Inspector Gadget returns to the ABC after a very long absence with the series now broadcasting every Sunday morning.
- 27 December – Australian children's series Fat Cat and Friends airs on Seven Network for the very last time. The series was then cancelled due to the Australian Broadcasting Tribunal claiming that it was not educational enough and not clearly defined and it will might confuse young children.
- 30 December – Australian children's series The Book Place debuts on Seven Network.
- 31 December – The Northern New South Wales television market is aggregated, with Prime Television taking a Seven Network affiliation, NBN taking a Nine Network affiliation & NRTV (now Southern Cross Ten) taking a Network Ten affiliation.
- Whole year – Hey Hey It's Saturday tours Australia, celebrating the show's 20th Anniversary, touring Adelaide, Perth, Brisbane, including the opening of Warner Bros. Movie World on the Gold Coast and Warner Bros. Studios in Hollywood.

== Debuts ==
=== Domestic ===
Program	Network	Debut date
Sunrise	Seven Network	17 January
Ten Eyewitness News Late	Network Ten	21 January
All Together Now	Nine Network	22 January
Chances	Nine Network	29 January
Extra	Nine Network	9 February
Eggshells	ABC	11 February
Landline	ABC	11 March
Couch Potato	ABC	17 March
Live and Sweaty	ABC	22 March
The Life and Death of Sandy Stone	ABC	29 April
Goodsports	Nine Network	3 May
Act of Necessity	ABC	8 May
Half a World Away	ABC	22 May
Hampton Court	Seven Network	30 May
Big Square Eye	ABC	24 June
What's Cooking?	Nine Network	1 July
Blockbusters	Seven Network	15 July
DAAS Kapital	ABC	15 July
Kids' Stuff	Network Ten	27 July
Kelly	Network Ten	10 August
Adventures on Kythera	Nine Network	13 August
Brides of Christ	ABC	4 September
Which Way Home	Network Ten	22 September
Rex Hunt's Fishing Adventures	Seven Network	27 September
Rose Against the Odds	Seven Network	29 September
Finders Keepers	ABC	28 October
The Worst Day of My Life	ABC	4 November
Animal Park	Seven Network	24 November
The Miraculous Mellops	Network Ten	25 November
Global Gardener	ABC	29 November
The Book Place	Seven Network	30 December

=== International ===
Program	Network	Debut date
(United Kingdom) Mr. Bean	ABC	2 January
(United Kingdom) Traffik	Nine Network	6 January
(United States) Ann Jillian	Nine Network	7 January
(United States) Homeroom	Nine Network	14 January
(United States) Totally Hidden Video	Network Ten	21 January
(United Kingdom) / (Wales) East of the Moon	ABC	22 January
(United States) Alien Nation	Network Ten	22 January
(Czechoslovakia) White Again	SBS	23 January
(United Kingdom) Take Me Home	ABC	29 January
(United States) The Super Mario Bros. Super Show!	Nine Network	4 February
(United States) The Legend of Zelda	Nine Network	8 February
(United States) The Simpsons	Network Ten	10 February
(United States) Heartland	Nine Network	10 February
(Italy) Octopus 4	SBS	17 February
(United Kingdom) Smith and Jones in Small Doses	SBS	17 February
(United States) Twin Peaks	Network Ten	18 February
(United Kingdom) The Paradise Club	ABC	18 February
(United Kingdom) Campaign	ABC	19 February
(United States) The Nutt House	Seven Network	28 February
(United States) / (Australia) Something Is Out There	Nine Network	7 March
(United Kingdom) Grim Tales	ABC	11 March
(United Kingdom) The Trap Door	ABC	17 March
(United Kingdom) The Trials of Life	ABC	17 March
(United Kingdom) French and Saunders	ABC	18 March
(United Kingdom) The Great Moghuls	SBS	24 March
(United Kingdom) Maid Marian and Her Merry Men	ABC	25 March
(United States) Tiny Toon Adventures	Nine Network	26 March
(United Kingdom) Charlie Chalk	ABC	1 April
(United Kingdom) No Job for a Lady	ABC	1 April
(United States) / (Canada) Friday the 13th: The Series	Network Ten	5 April
(United States) Guys Next Door	Seven Network	6 April
(United States) Saved By the Bell	Seven Network	6 April
(United States) Gumby Adventures	ABC	22 April
(United States) The Flash	Nine Network	9 May
(United States) Mancuso, F.B.I.	Seven Network	9 May
(United Kingdom) South of the Border	ABC	13 May
(Canada) Degrassi High	ABC	15 May
(United Kingdom) Blackeyes	ABC	26 May
(United Kingdom) Alfonso Bonzo	ABC	27 May
(United Kingdom) The Manageress	ABC	27 May
(United States) Anything But Love	Network Ten	29 May
(United States) Wake, Rattle and Roll	Network Ten	3 June
(United Kingdom) Billy Webb's Amazing Stories	ABC	4 June
(United Kingdom) Blackadder Goes Forth	Seven Network	6 June
(United Kingdom) Postman Pat	ABC	10 June
(United Kingdom) TUGS	ABC	10 June
(United States) Top of the Hill	Nine Network	17 June
(United States) / (United Kingdom) / (Wales) The Further Adventures of SuperTed	ABC	17 June
(United Kingdom) House of Cards	ABC	19 June
(United States) Tender Is the Night	ABC	23 June
(United Kingdom) French Fields	ABC	24 June
(United States) Alvin and the Chipmunks (Murakami-Wolf-Swenson/DIC Entertainment version)	ABC	4 July
(United States) Zorro (1990)	Network Ten	8 July
(United States) The Civil War	SBS	15 July
(United Kingdom) Capital City	ABC	23 July
(United States) Equal Justice	Network Ten	23 July
(United States) Dink, the Little Dinosaur	Network Ten	27 July
(United States) Attack of the Killer Tomatoes	Network Ten	27 July
(United States) / (Canada) Piggsburg Pigs!	Network Ten	28 July
(United States) Today's Gourmet	SBS	3 August
(United States) / (United Kingdom) The Ghost of Faffner Hall	Network Ten	4 August
(United States) The Josephine Baker Story	Network Ten	5 August
(United States) The Oprah Winfrey Show	Network Ten	5 August
(United Kingdom) This is David Lander	SBS	6 August
(United Kingdom) Mr. Fixit	ABC	6 August
(United Kingdom) Grandma Bricks of Swallow Street	ABC	12 August
(Greece) Flower Street	SBS	26 August
(New Zealand) Strangers	ABC	28 August
(United States) The Muppets at Walt Disney World	Seven Network	1 September
(United States) Tom and Jerry Kids	Seven Network	5 September
(United Kingdom) Five Minute Wonder	ABC	11 September
(United States) I'm Telling!	Seven Network	19 September
(United States) Police Squad!	Seven Network	19 September
(United States) The Arsenio Hall Show	Nine Network	19 September
(United States) Commander Crumbcake	Network Ten	28 September
(United States) Telling Tales	SBS	29 September
(United States) In Living Color	Network Ten	29 September
(United Kingdom) Drop the Dead Donkey	SBS	1 October
(United States) Captain Planet and the Planeteers	ABC	7 October
(United States) The All-New Candid Camera	Network Ten	7 October
(United Kingdom) Tom's Midnight Garden (1988 version)	ABC	11 October
(United States) / (Japan) Peter Pan and the Pirates	Network Ten	26 October
(United States) Bobby's World	Network Ten	26 October
(United States) The Fanelli Boys	Seven Network	5 November
(United States) Star Trek: The Next Generation	Nine Network	6 November
(United States) Little Wizards	Network Ten	17 November
(United States) Super Force	Nine Network	18 November
(United States) Lucky Chances	Seven Network	27 November
(United States) Beverly Hills 90210	Network Ten	29 November
(United States) Rescue 911	Nine Network	2 December
(United States) The Fresh Prince of Bel-Air	Nine Network	3 December
(United States) Parker Lewis Can't Lose	Nine Network	3 December
(United Kingdom) / (Russia) / (Ukraine) / (Kazakhstan) Red Empire	ABC	4 December
(United States) A Family for Joe (TV movie)	Seven Network	6 December
(United Kingdom) Joint Account	ABC	8 December
(United States) The 100 Lives of Black Jack Savage	Seven Network	9 December
(United States) Hull High	Seven Network	10 December
(United States) A Family for Joe (TV series)	Seven Network	10 December
(United States) Baby Talk	Nine Network	13 December
(United States) Married People	Nine Network	13 December
(United States) Dear John (USA)	Nine Network	16 December
(United States) Evening Shade	Nine Network	19 December
(United States) Wings	Nine Network	19 December
(Canada) Maniac Mansion	Network Ten	23 December
(United Kingdom) The Fool of the World and the Flying Ship	ABC	25 December
(Wales) Fireman Sam: Snow Business	ABC	25 December
(United Kingdom) My Family and Other Animals	Network Ten	28 December
(United States) The Muppets Celebrate Jim Henson	Seven Network	29 December
(United States) Star Trek: 25th Anniversary	Seven Network	31 December
(United States) The Adventures of Don Coyote and Sancho Panda	Seven Network	1991
(United States) Gravedale High	Seven Network	1991
(United States) TaleSpin	Seven Network	1991
(United States) Captain N: The Game Master	Seven Network	1991
(Italy) (Japan) Sherlock Hound	Nine Network	1991

=== Changes to network affiliation ===
This is a list of programs which made their premiere on an Australian television network that had previously premiered on another Australian television network. The networks involved in the switch of allegiances are predominantly both free-to-air networks or both subscription television networks. Programs that have their free-to-air/subscription television premiere, after previously premiering on the opposite platform (free-to air to subscription/subscription to free-to air) are not included. In some cases, programs may still air on the original television network. This occurs predominantly with programs shared between subscription television networks.

==== Domestic ====
Program	New network(s)	Previous network(s)	Date
Patrol Boat	Network Ten	ABC	1 June

==== International ====
Program	New network(s)	Previous network(s)	Date
(United States) Rocky and Bullwinkle	ABC	Nine Network	26 August
(United States) Married... with Children	Nine Network	Network Ten	27 August
(United States) Magilla Gorilla	Seven Network	Nine Network	December
(United States) Casper and the Angels	Seven Network	ABC	1991

== Television shows ==
ABC TV

- Mr. Squiggle and Friends (1959–1999)
- Four Corners (1961–present)
- Rage (1987–present)
- G.P. (1989–1996)

Seven Network

- Wheel of Fortune (1981–1996, 1996–2003, 2004–06)
- A Country Practice (1981–1994)
- Home and Away (1988–present)
- Family Feud (1988–1996)
- Fast forward (1989–1992)

Nine Network

- Sale of the Century (1980–2001)
- A Current Affair (1971–1978, 1988–present)
- Hey Hey It's Saturday (1971–1999)
- The Midday Show (1973–1998)
- 60 Minutes (1979–present)
- Sunday (1981–2008)
- Today (1982–present)
- The Flying Doctors (1986–1991)
- Australia's Funniest Home Video Show (1990–present)
- Golden Fiddles (1991)

Network Ten

- Neighbours (1985–present)
- E Street (1989–1993)
- Til Ten (1989–1991)

== Ending this year ==
Date	Show	Channel	Debut
2 February	Rafferty's Rules	Seven Network	1987
10 May	Overseas and Undersold	ABC	1988
16 July	The Big Gig	ABC	1989
7 August	The New Adventures of Blinky Bill	ABC	1984
9 August	Pugwall	Nine Network	13 June 1989
22 August	Hampton Court	Seven Network	30 May 1991
25 August	Golden Fiddles	Nine Network	18 August 1991
30 August	A Big Country	ABC	1968
23 September	Which Way Home	Network Ten	22 September 1991
9 October	Brides of Christ	ABC	4 September 1991
23 November	The Cartoon Company	Nine Network	1986
23 November	The C Company	Nine Network	1990
1 December	The River Kings	ABC	10 November 1991
9 December	The Worst Day of My Life	ABC	4 November 1991
20 December	Global Gardener	ABC	29 November 1991
27 December	Fat Cat and Friends	Network Ten; Seven Network	1972
27 December	Til Ten	Network Ten	1989

== See also ==
- 1991 in Australia
- List of Australian films of 1991
