= The BBQ =

- Film poster
- Directed by: Stephen Amis
- Written by: Stephen Amis; Serge De Nardo; David Richardson; Angelo Salamanca
- Produced by: Stephen Amis; Tait Brady; Deb Fryers; Lynne Wilson
- Starring: Shane Jacobson; Magda Szubanski; Julia Zemiro; Nicholas Hammond
- Cinematography: David Richardson
- Edited by: Bill Murphy
- Music by: Ricky Edwards
- Production company: BBQ Three Pty Ltd
- Release date: 22 February 2018
- Running time: 87 minutes
- Country: Australia
- Language: English

The BBQ is a 2018 Australian comedy film written and directed by Stephen Amis. Starring Shane Jacobson, Magda Szubanski, Julia Zemiro, Nicholas Hammond, and Manu Feildel. It was filmed at Albury, New South Wales. My Kitchen Rules co-host Manu Feildel has a guest role in the film.

== Plot synopsis ==
Shane Jacobson stars as Dazza, a loveable suburban everyman who claims to be a descendant of Captain Cook and has a passion for barbecuing, but after accidentally giving his neighbours food poisoning at his regular Saturday barbecue, Dazza's reputation and dignity are on the line. Seeking atonement, he teams up with a tyrannical Scottish chef known as "The Butcher" and enters an international barbecue competition.

== Cast ==
- Sam Winspear-Schillings as Dave
- Shane Jacobson as Dazza
- Nicholas Hammond as Carver
- Lara Robinson as Montana
- Magda Szubanski as The Butcher
- Faith Seci as Samantha
- Justine Jones as Lisa
- Rodney Afif as Mr. Spittle
- Manu Feildel as Andre Mont Blanc
- Julia Zemiro as Dianne
- John Orcsik as Hector

== Reception ==
The BBQ received negative reviews from critics and audiences. It holds a 30% approval rating on review aggregator Rotten Tomatoes, based on 10 reviews, with an average rating of 3.8/10.

Leigh Paatsch of the Herald Sun called the film "so overwhelmingly bland, you often forget how faintly awful it consistently remains from beginning to end." Luke Buckmaster of The Guardian wrote, "Jacobson may be the best thing about the director and co-writer Stephen Amis' The BBQ, though that is not the same as saying he comes even remotely close to saving it."
