= Stephen Amis =

Australian screenwriter and director

Stephen Amis (born 21 November 1966) is an Australian film and television screenwriter, film director and film producer, known mostly for his independent sci-fi, action and fantasy-themed films.

== Personal life ==
Stephen Amis was born in Melbourne, Victoria, Australia, and graduated from the Swinburne Film & Television School in 1989. Stephen went on to produce and direct the 16mm short, Virus (2005) – a steam-punk science fiction fantasy, set at the Melbourne Astronomical Observatory in 1888. The film featured state of the art CGI special effects, and starred Kerry Armstrong and John Stanton.

== Career ==
His first feature film, See Jack Run, won the 1994 Australian Children's Film Festival. He is set to direct Defend – Conserve – Protect, a documentary centered on the work of Sea Shepherd Conservation Society, featuring actor Dan Aykroyd. In 2012 he wrote, produced and directed the WWII sci-fi adventure The 25th Reich. In 2018, he wrote and directed the film The BBQ.

== Awards ==
He won the 1986 Victorian Young Achiever's Award and two Australian Cinematographer's Awards.
