= 1990–91 Australian region cyclone season =

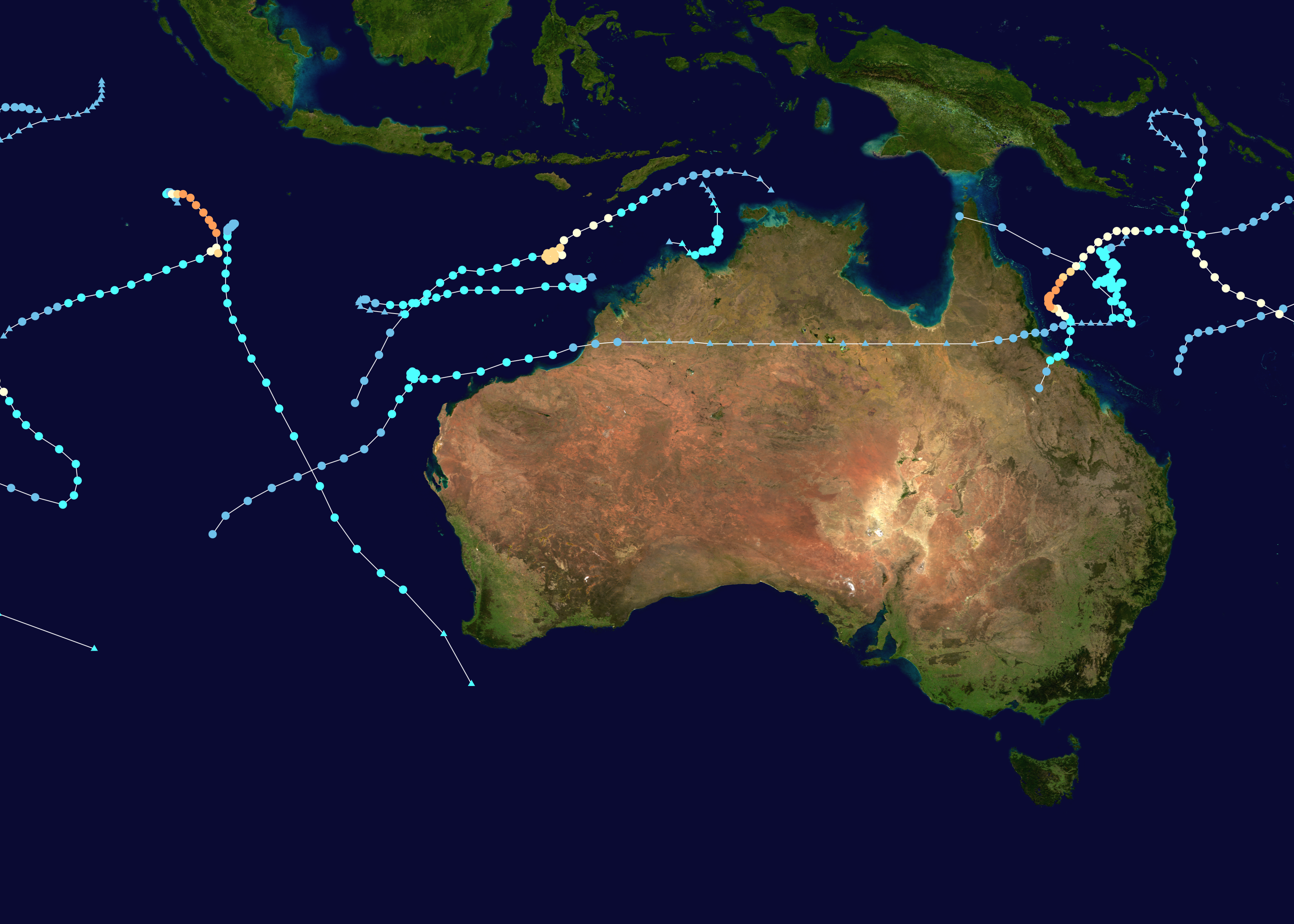
- Season summary map

Seasonal boundaries
- First system formed: 10 December 1990
- Last system dissipated: 11 May 1991

Strongest storm
- Name: Marian
  - Maximum winds: 210 km/h (130 mph) (10-minute sustained)
  - Lowest pressure: 930 hPa (mbar)

Seasonal statistics
- Tropical lows: 12
- Tropical cyclones: 10
- Severe tropical cyclones: 3
- Total fatalities: 56
- Total damage: $63.87 million (1991 USD)

Related articles
- 1990–91 South-West Indian Ocean cyclone season; 1990–91 South Pacific cyclone season

The 1990–91 Australian region cyclone season was a slightly below average cyclone season, with ten tropical cyclones occurring within the region between 90°E and 160°E. The season officially ran from November 1, 1990, to April 30, 1991, with the first disturbance of the season forming on 10 December and the last disturbance moving out of the region during 11 May. Six people were killed by Cyclone Joy when it made landfall on Australia. During the season, tropical cyclones were monitored by the Australian Bureau of Meteorology, who ran Tropical Cyclone Warning Centers (TCWC) in Perth, Darwin, and Brisbane. The United States Joint Typhoon Warning Center (JTWC) and Papua New Guinea National Weather Service also monitored systems within the basin during the season. The JTWC designated systems with a number and either a S or a P suffix depending on which side of 135E. The Bureau of Meteorology and Papua New Guinea national Weather Service both used the Australian Tropical Cyclone Intensity Scale, and estimated windspeeds over a ten-minute period, while the JTWC estimated sustained winds over a one-minute period and are comparable to the Saffir–Simpson Hurricane Scale.

== Systems ==
=== Tropical Cyclone Laurence ===
- Category 1 tropical cyclone (Australian scale)
- Tropical storm (SSHWS)
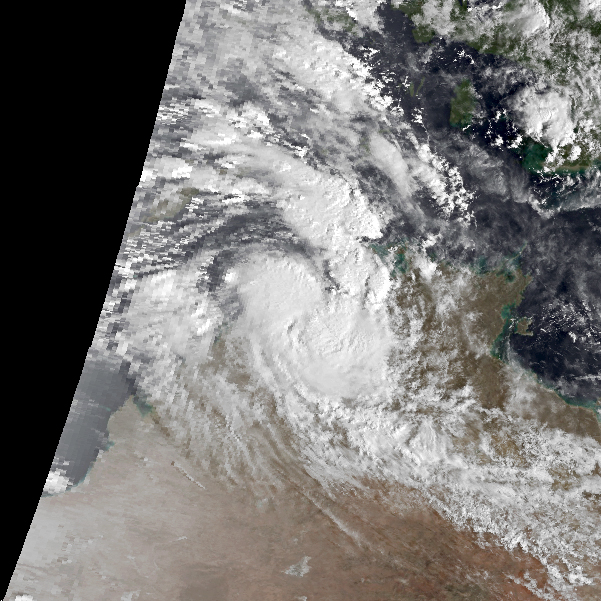
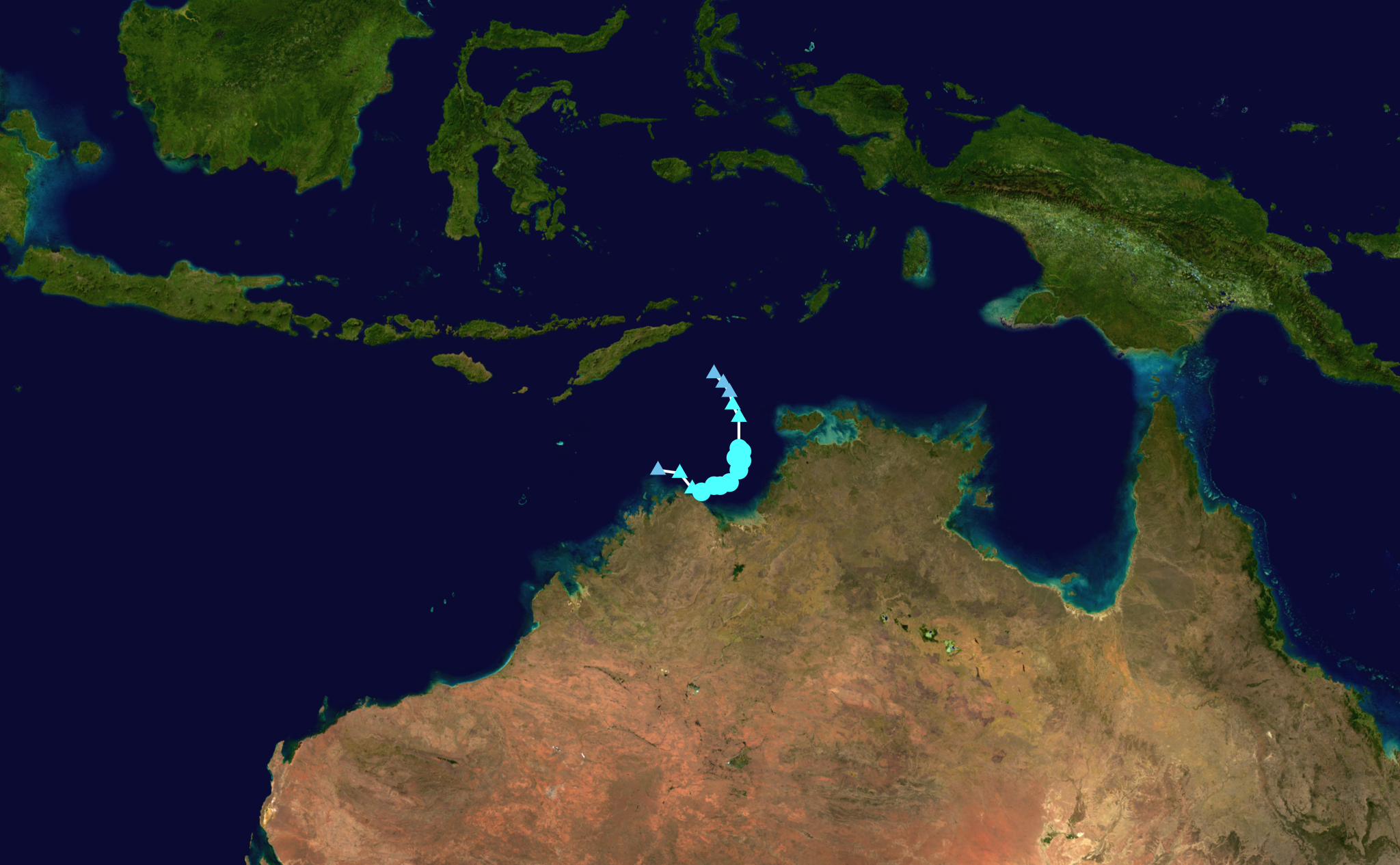
- Duration: 10 December – 12 December
- Peak intensity: 65 km/h (40 mph) (10-min); 992 hPa (mbar)

On 8 December, a cluster of clouds developed over the Timor sea and moved towards the south-east, following a large scale mid-latitude forcing event. During the next day, the system developed into a tropical low about 360 km (225 mi) to the south-east of Dili, East Timor while continuing to develop and move towards the south-east. During 10 January as the low became detectable on Darwin's radar, TCWC Darwin reported that the low had developed into a category one tropical cyclone and named it Laurence while reporting that the cyclone had reached its 10-minute peak intensity of 65 km/h (40 mph). Early on 11 January, the JTWC designated Laurence as 05S and initiated warnings on the cyclone with 1-minute windspeeds equivalent to a tropical depression. Later that day TCWC Darwin, reported that Laurence had weakened below cyclone intensity under the influence of vertical wind shear from low-level easterlies while the JTWC reported that Laurence had reached its 1-minute peak intensity of 65 km/h (40 mph). The JTWC kept Laurence at its peak intensity until 2000 WST (1200 UTC) the next day when they reported that the cyclone had become equivalent to a tropical depression. Laurence's remnants moved west over the next few days before dissipating near Rowley Shoals early on 16 December. The only damage that was associated with the cyclone, was the sinking of a fishing boat on 11 December, however TCWC Darwin considers this damage to be indirect because the boat was 150 km (95 mi) away, from the cyclone centre and the radius of gales was less than 55 km (35 mi).

=== Severe Tropical Cyclone Joy ===
- Category 4 severe tropical cyclone (Australian scale)
- Category 3 tropical cyclone (SSHWS)
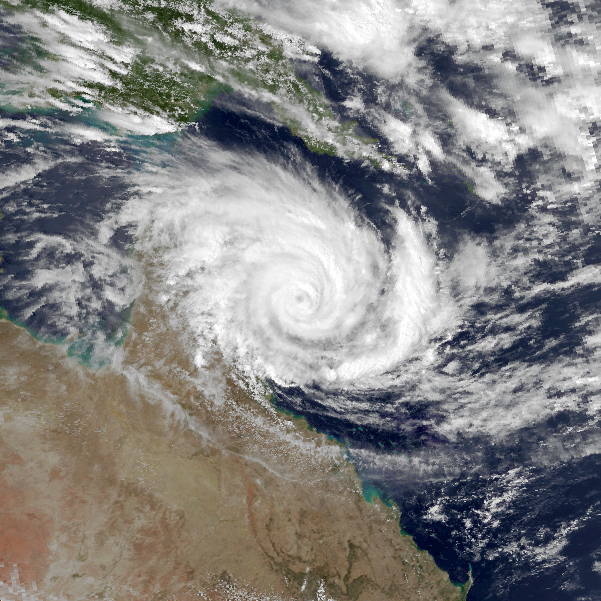
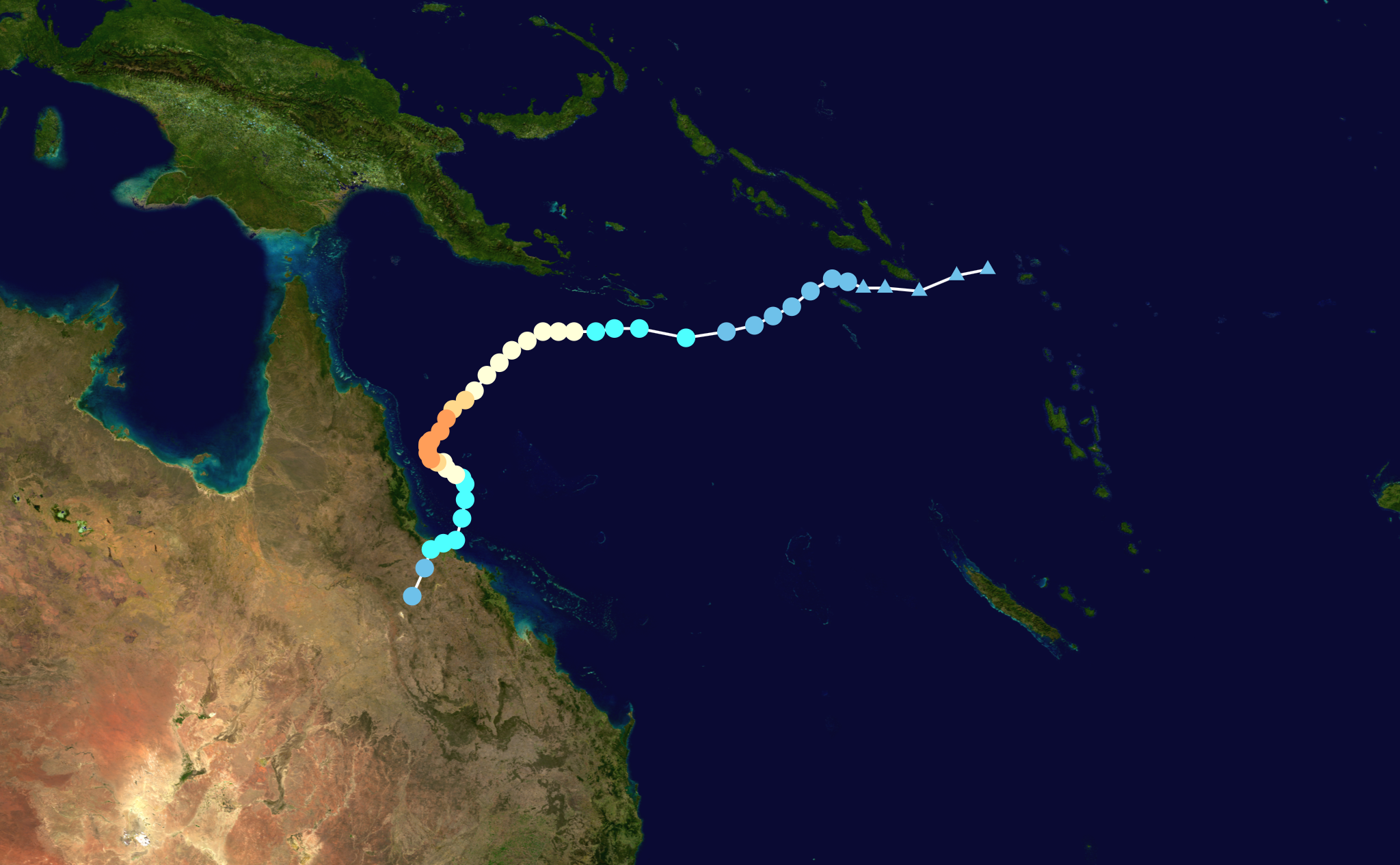
- Duration: 17 December (Crossed 160°E) – 27 December
- Peak intensity: 165 km/h (105 mph) (10-min); 940 hPa (mbar)

On 17 December, TCWC Brisbane started to monitor a tropical low that had moved into the basin from the South Pacific. Beginning 24 December 1990, the outer bands of Cyclone Joy reached Queensland, Australia. The storm killed 5 people and caused extensive flooding. Joy reached Category 4 intensity off the coast of Cairns on 24 December 1990, before crossing the coast to the North of Townsville, on 26 December 1990. The remnants of Joy created a convergence zone along the central Queensland coast, with many locations around the Mackay region recording over 2000 mm of rain during the following week.

=== Tropical Cyclone Chris ===
- Category 2 tropical cyclone (Australian scale)
- Tropical storm (SSHWS)
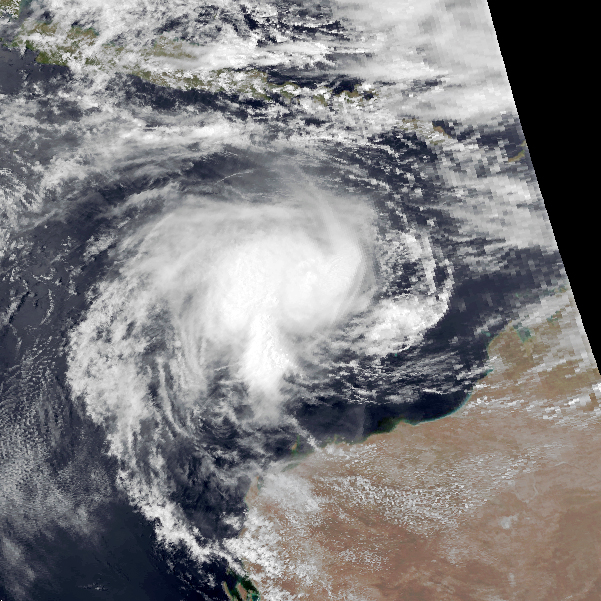
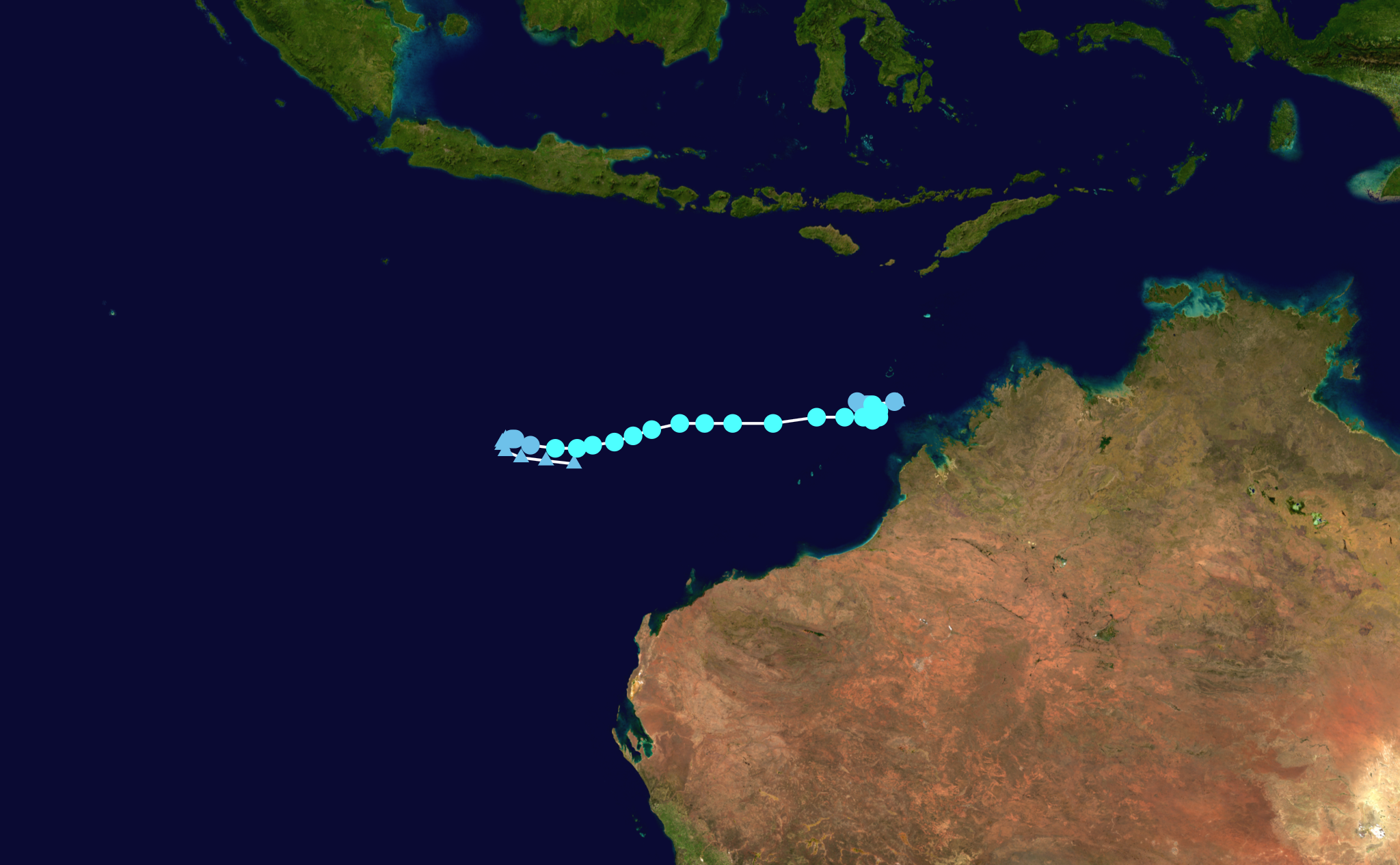
- Duration: 15 February – 21 February
- Peak intensity: 110 km/h (70 mph) (10-min); 976 hPa (mbar)

On 15 February, the cyclone formed 170 km northwest from the Kimberly coastline, and travelled west. Its intensity peaked on 19 February, and dissipated on 21 February, without impacts.

=== Tropical Cyclone Daphne ===
- Category 2 tropical cyclone (Australian scale)
- Tropical storm (SSHWS)
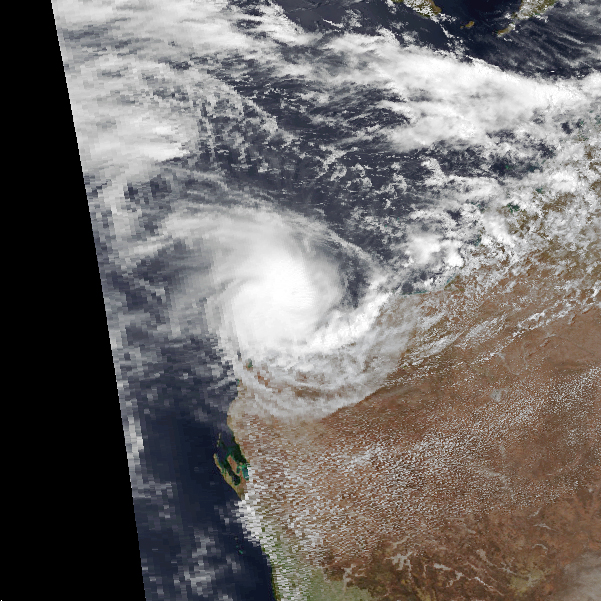
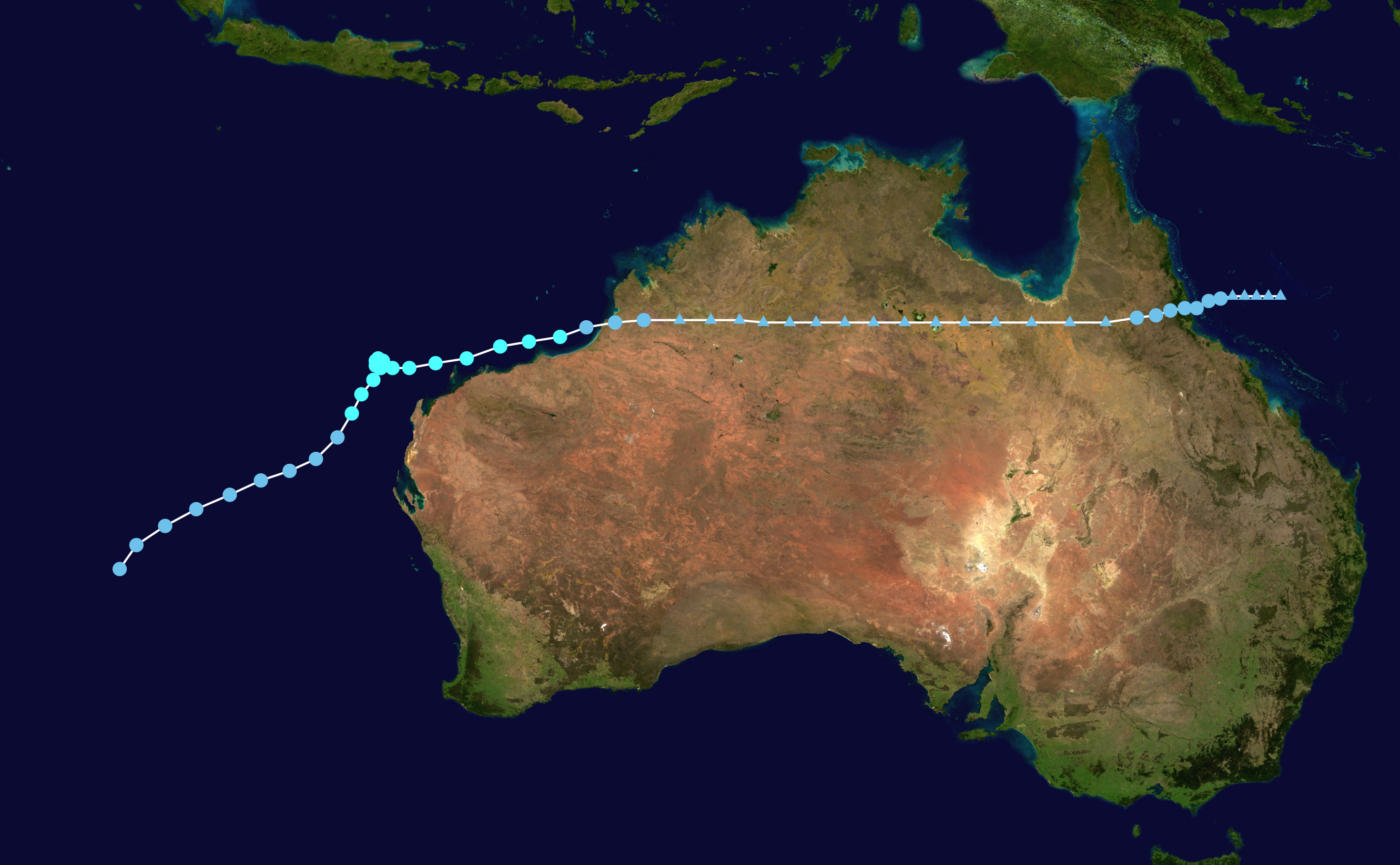
- Duration: 21 February – 28 February
- Peak intensity: 110 km/h (70 mph) (10-min); 976 hPa (mbar)

On 21 February, Daphne formed near the Gulf of Carpentaria, reaching peak intensity on 23 February in the Indian Ocean, before weakening below category 1 strength and dissipating 28 February.

=== Tropical Cyclone Kelvin ===
- Category 2 tropical cyclone (Australian scale)
- Tropical storm (SSHWS)
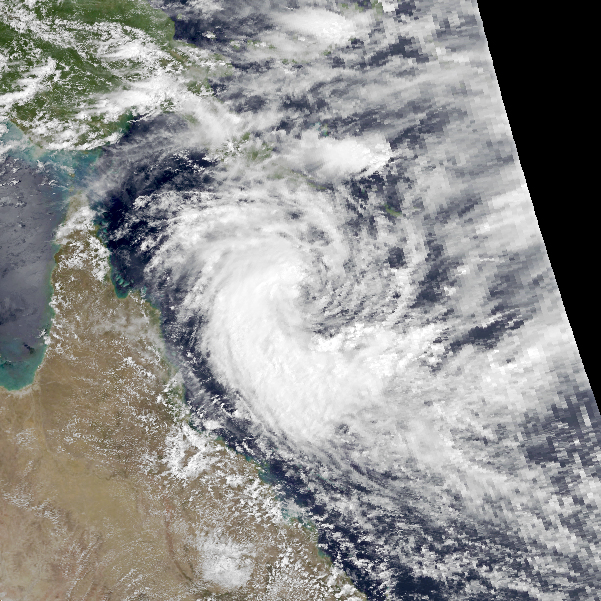
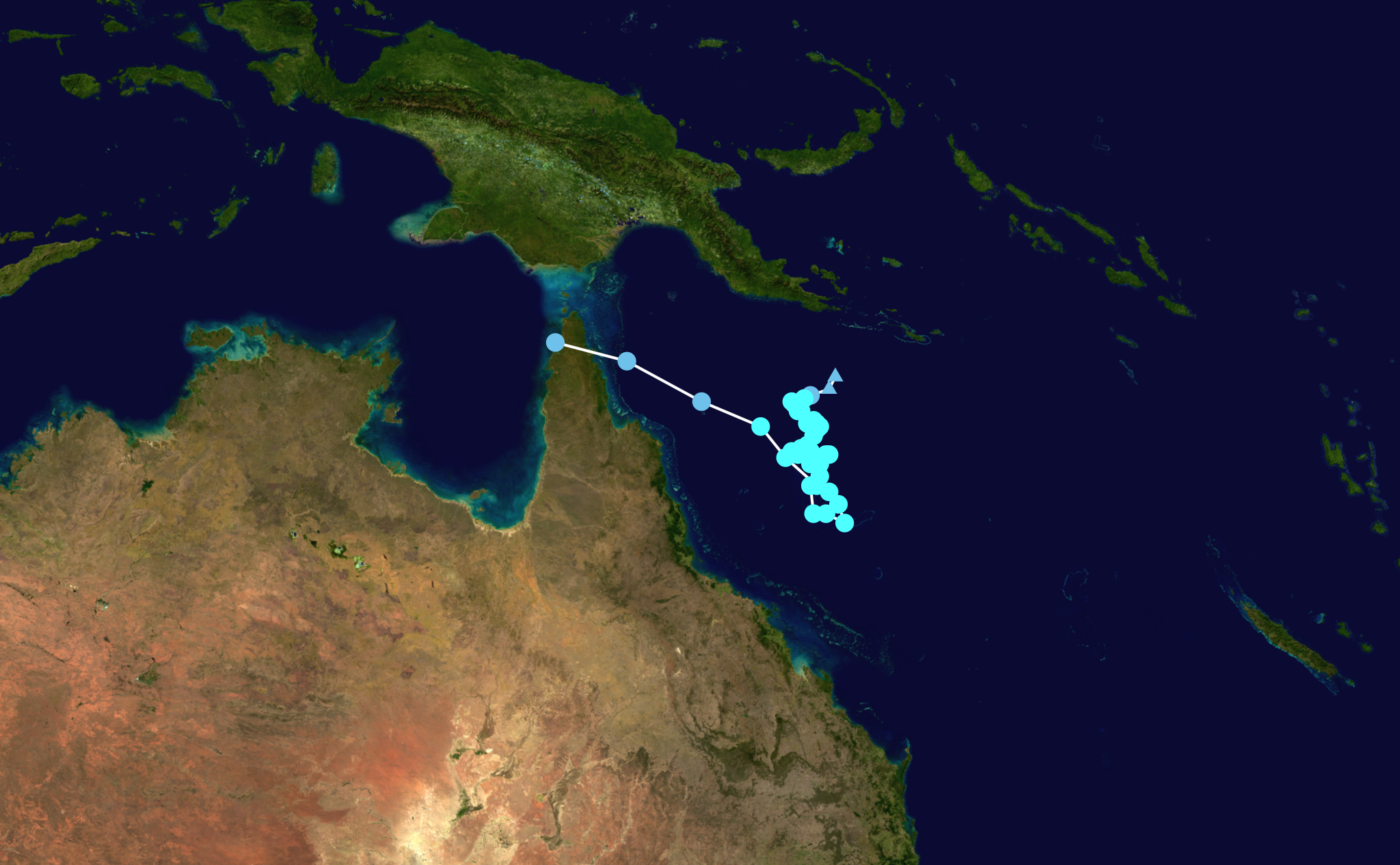
- Duration: 24 February – 5 March
- Peak intensity: 110 km/h (70 mph) (10-min); 980 hPa (mbar)

Kelvin developed from a tropical low which moved east from the Gulf of Carpentaria into the Coral Sea, where it intensified and was named on 25 February. Later that day it reached peak intensity near Willis Island, where gusts to 160 km/h were recorded. The cyclone moved erratically in the Coral Sea, before weakening below cyclone strength on 5 March.

=== Tropical Cyclone Elma ===
- Category 2 tropical cyclone (Australian scale)
- Category 1 tropical cyclone (SSHWS)
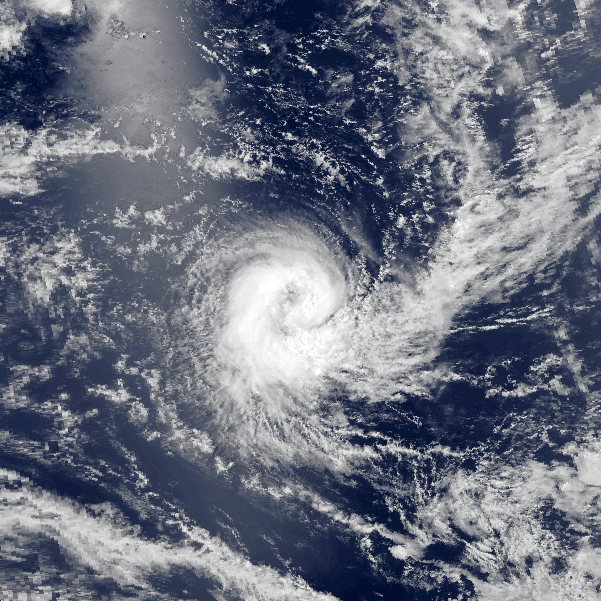
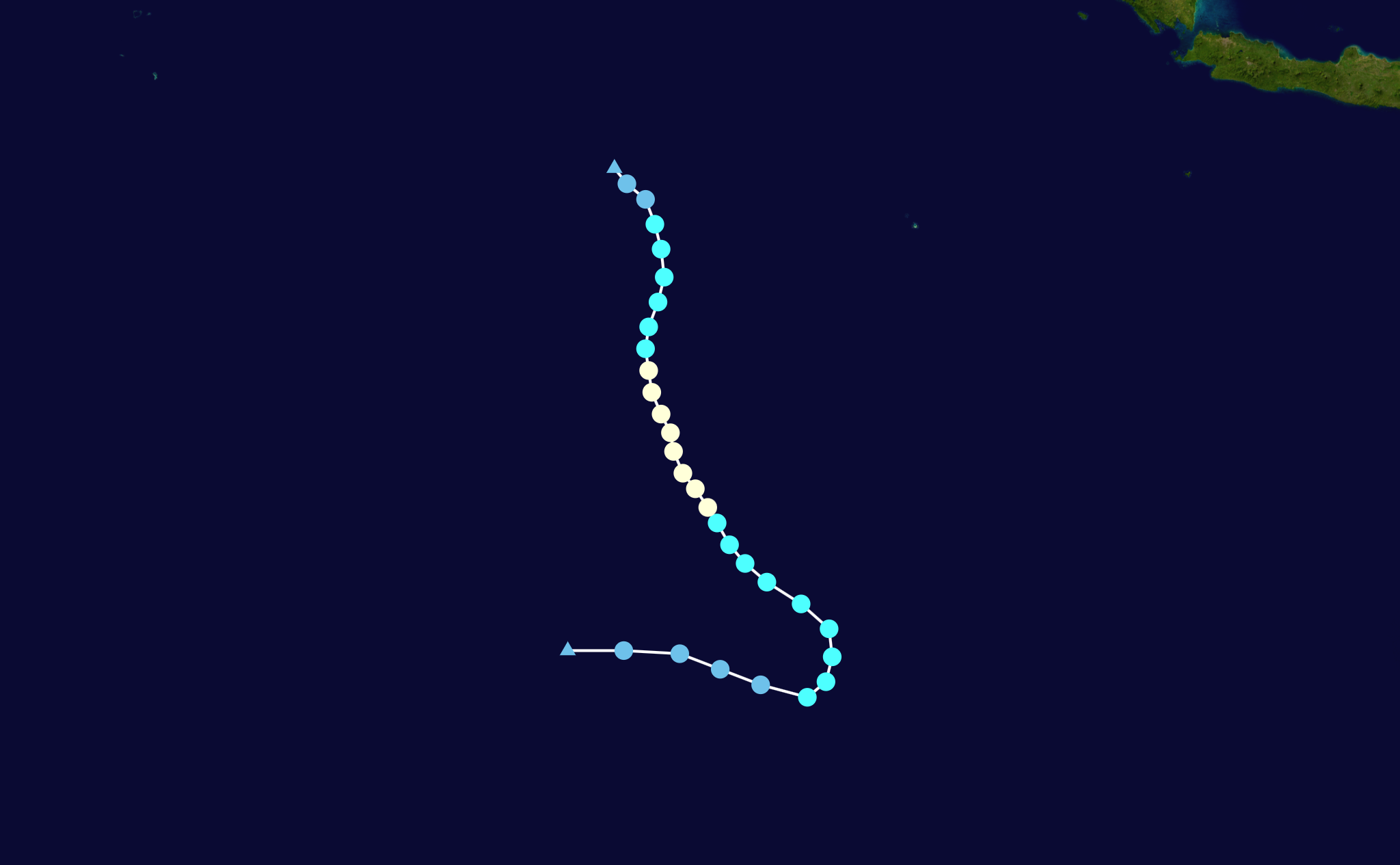
- Duration: 1 March (Entered basin) – 5 March (Exited basin)
- Peak intensity: 110 km/h (70 mph) (10-min); 965 hPa (mbar)

The cyclone formed on 26 February in the South–West Indian Ocean basin, reaching peak intensity on 1 March, and crossed 90°E into the Australian Region, where it tracked south. The system weakened below category 1 strength on 3 March, dissipating on 5 March.

=== Severe Tropical Cyclone Errol ===
- Category 4 severe tropical cyclone (Australian scale)
- Category 3 tropical cyclone (SSHWS)
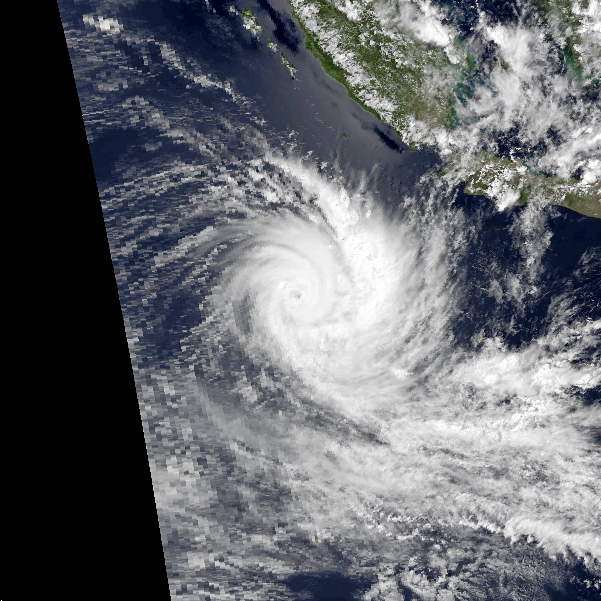
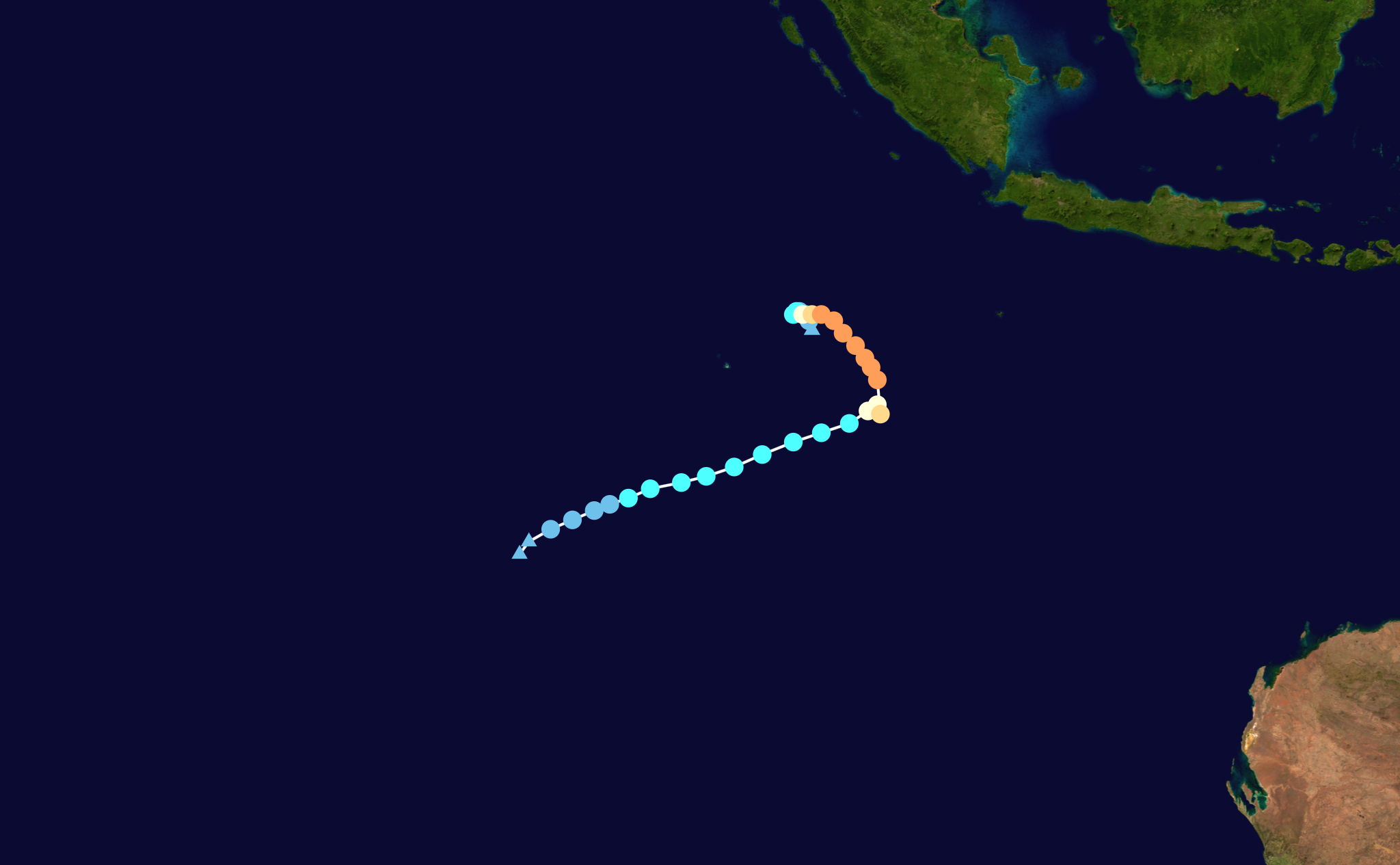
- Duration: 23 March – 31 March
- Peak intensity: 165 km/h (105 mph) (10-min); 950 hPa (mbar)

Cyclone Errol formed on 23 March 1991 and never hit land. The storm was responsible for a sinking of an Indonesian fishing boat.

=== Severe Tropical Cyclone Marian ===
- Category 4 severe tropical cyclone (Australian scale)
- Category 2 tropical cyclone (SSHWS)
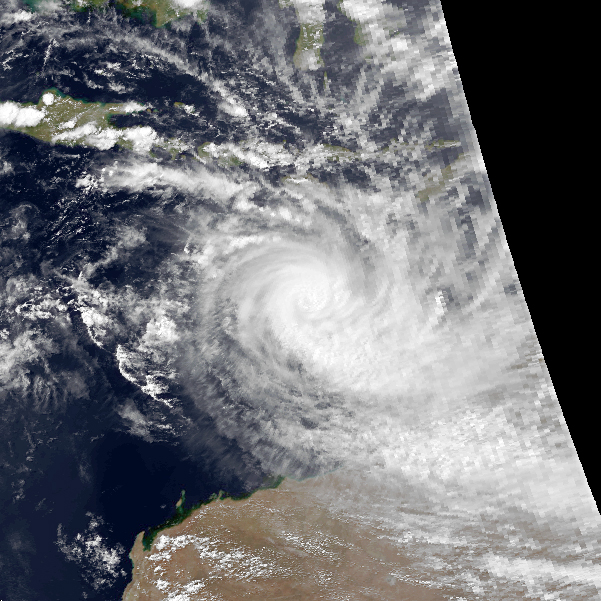
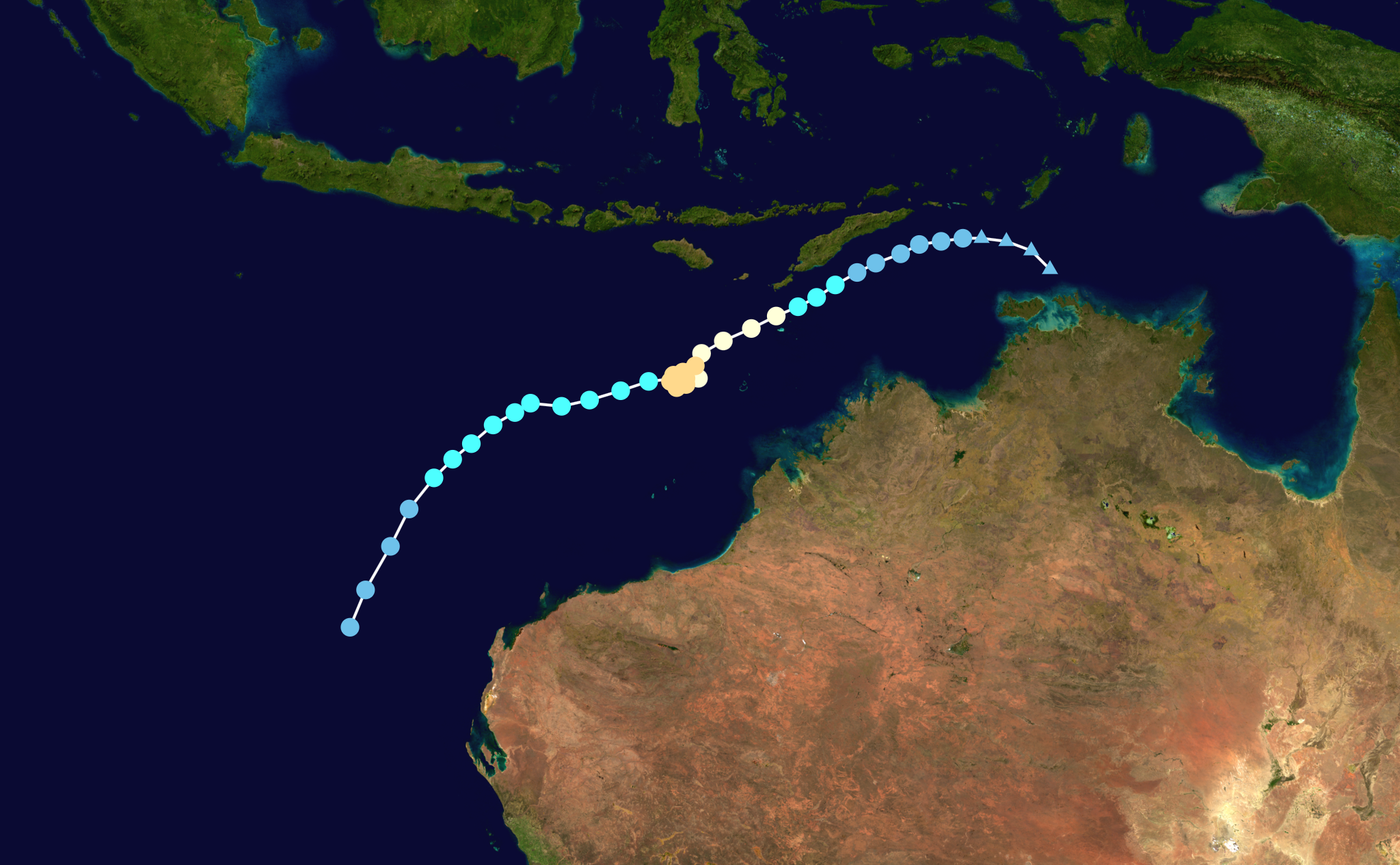
- Duration: 9 April – 19 April
- Peak intensity: 185 km/h (115 mph) (10-min); 930 hPa (mbar)

Severe tropical cyclone Marian was first evident as a middle-level depression over the western Arafura Sea. In response to a southeasterly surge and a weaker monsoonal surge, it intensified to cyclone strength about 110 km south of Timor, under a divergent upper northeasterly wind regime. Its initial development may have been inhibited by restrictions to its low-level inflow caused by the mountains of Timor to its north. Once clear of this barrier, the cyclone intensified rapidly as it continued to move west-southwest, under the influence of a subtropical high over Australia. It moved slowly and erratically between 13 and 16 April as a new middle-level ridge developed to its west. Its peak estimated intensity of 930 hPa was reached during this period and weakening commenced as vertical shear increased across the system. For a period of about one day, commencing 1000, 13 April, Tropical Cyclone Watch advices were issued for parts of the Pilbara and Kimberley coastline. These advices were cancelled when the shearing process become apparent. Marian weakened further as its remnants drifted southwest before being absorbed into the circulation associated with cyclone Fifi.

=== Tropical Cyclone Fifi ===
- Category 2 tropical cyclone (Australian scale)
- Tropical storm (SSHWS)
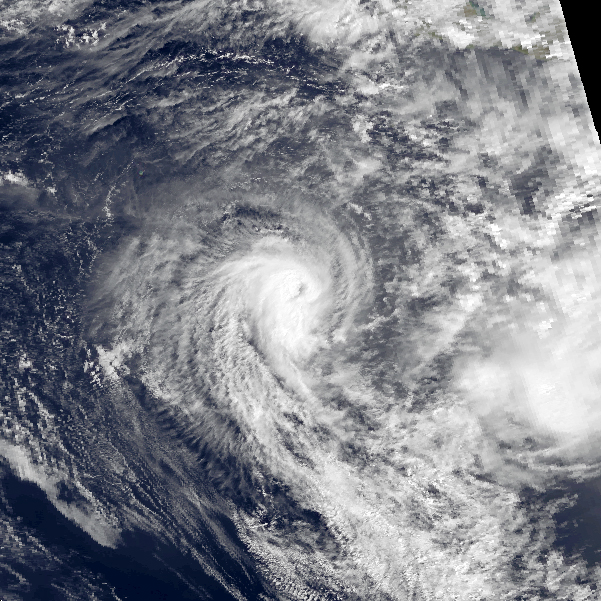
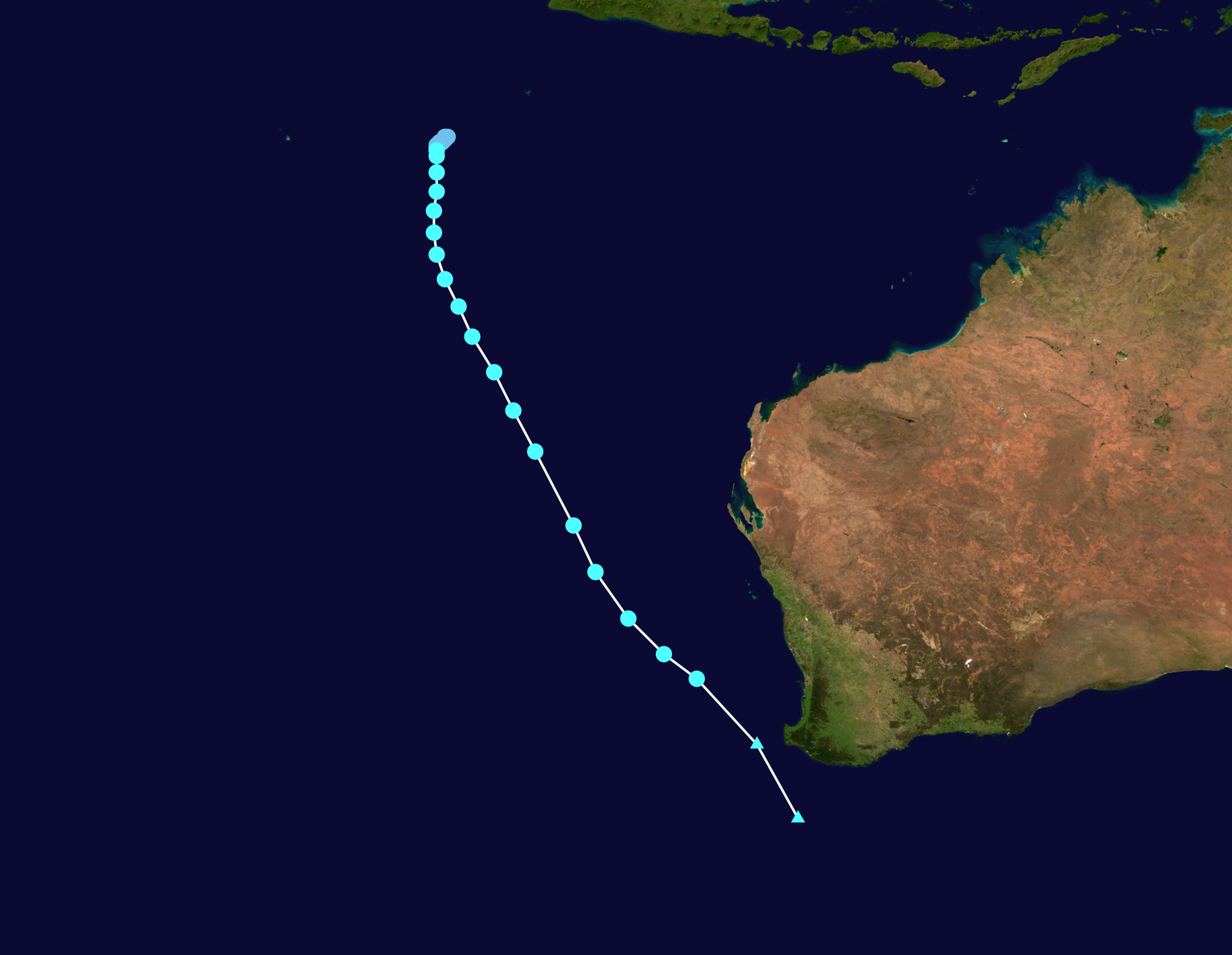
- Duration: 15 April – 20 April
- Peak intensity: 110 km/h (70 mph) (10-min); 975 hPa (mbar)

A severe cyclone, Fifi struck Western Australia in mid April 1991. The storm killed 29 people, 27 of which were from the sinking of bulk ore ship Mineral Diamond and left 100,000 homes without power.

=== Tropical Cyclone Lisa ===
- Category 2 tropical cyclone (Australian scale)
- Category 1 tropical cyclone (SSHWS)
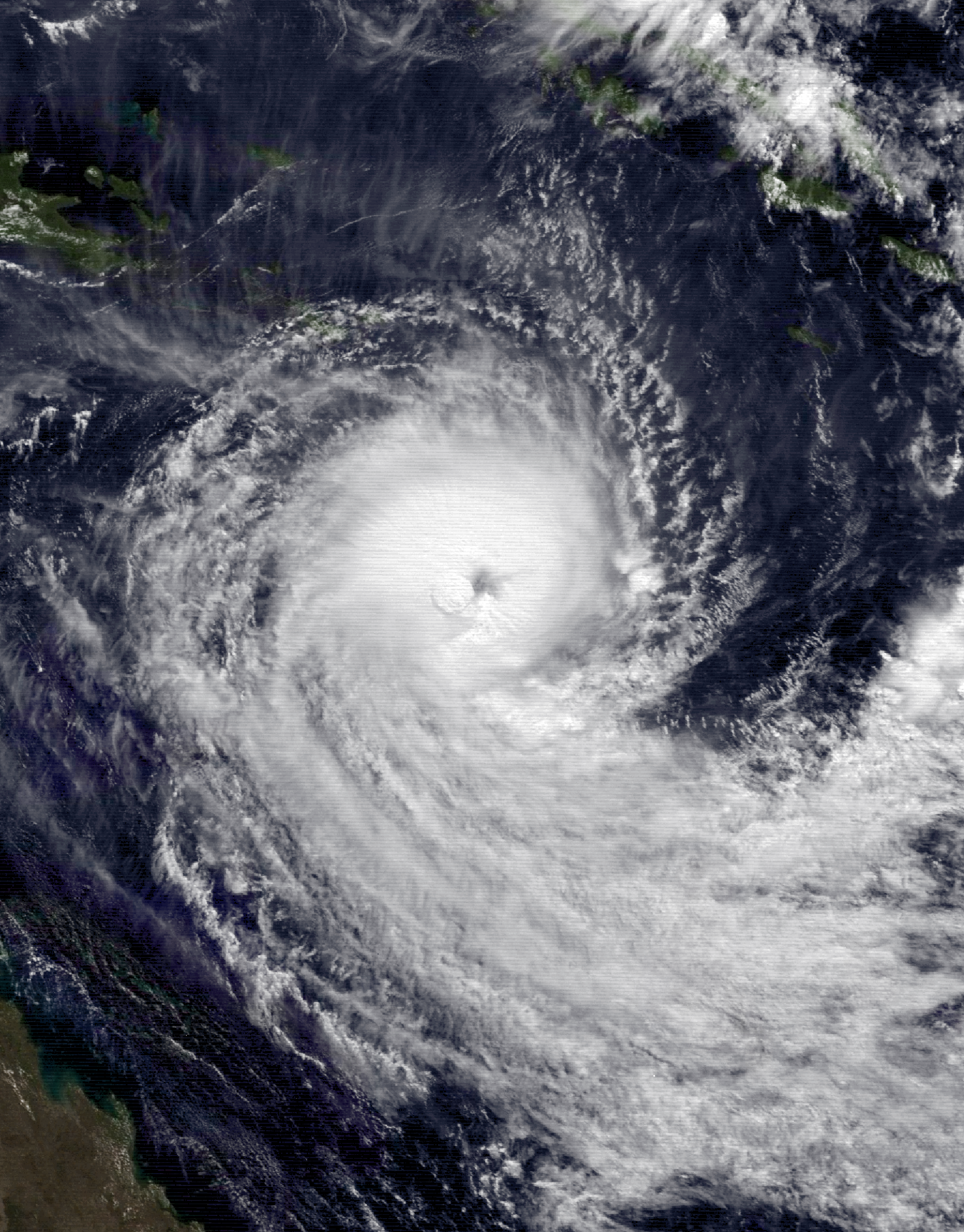
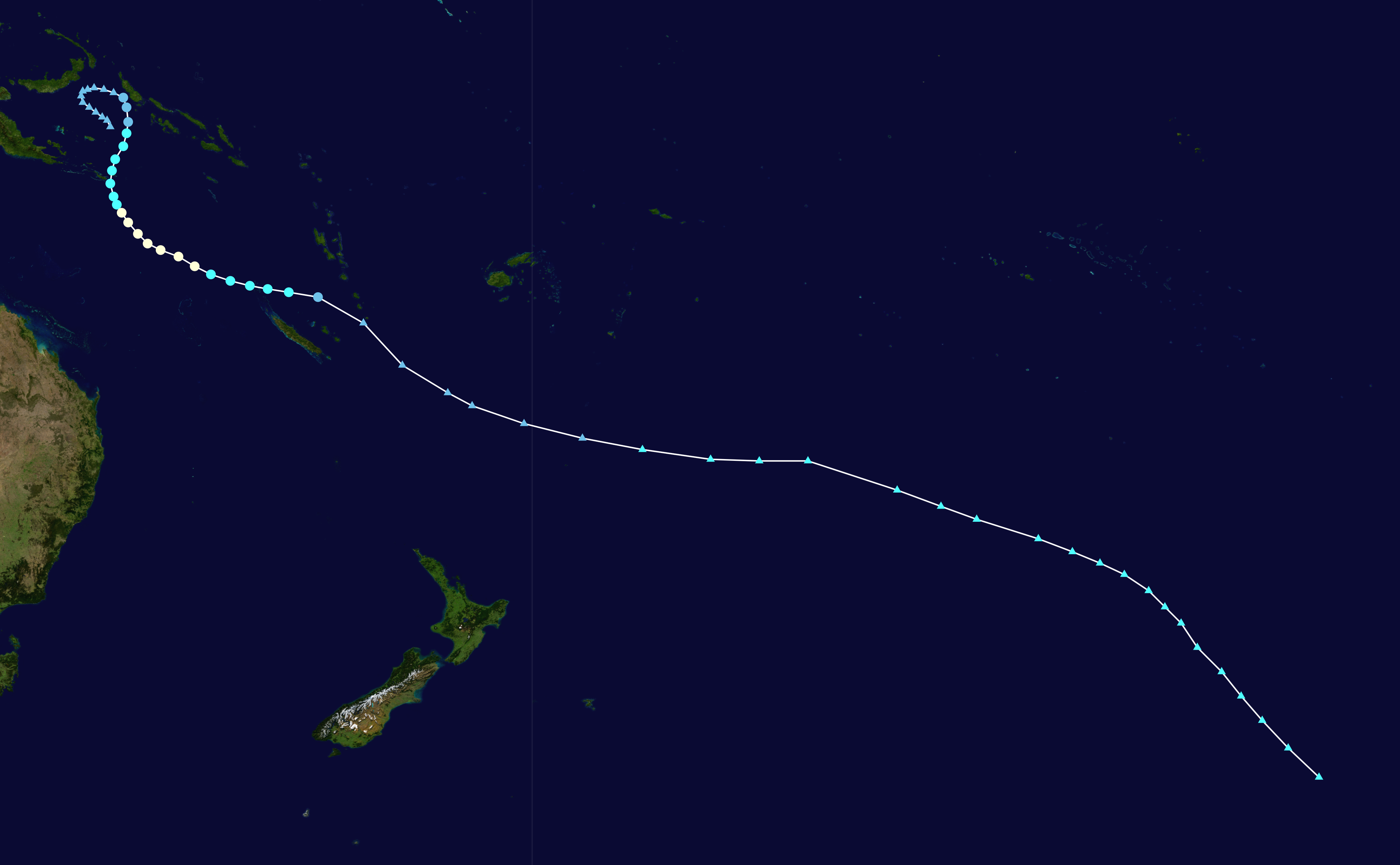
- Duration: 7 May – 11 May (Crossed 160°E)
- Peak intensity: 110 km/h (70 mph) (10-min); 975 hPa (mbar)

During 7 May, the BoM and the JTWC started to monitor a Tropical Low that had developed, along the South Pacific Convergence Zone near the island of Bouganville. During that day the low moved southwards and acquired the characteristics of a tropical cyclone, before it was named Lisa by TCWC Brisbane early the next day, after it had developed into a Category 1 tropical cyclone on the Australian scale. During that day the system continued to intensify as it moved towards the south-southwest across the axis of a ridge of high pressure towards a strong subtropical jet stream before it recurved and started to move towards the southeast during 9 May. During 9 May, the BoM reported that Lisa had become a category 2 tropical cyclone, before the system peaked with 10-minute sustained windspeeds of 110 km/h (70 mph) during the next day. The JTWC also reported during 10 May, that Lisa had peaked with 1-minute sustained winds of 150 km/h (90 mph)), which made it equivalent to a category 1 hurricane on the SSHWS. After it had peaked in intensity, Lisa encountered strong vertical windshear and started to gradually weaken during 11 May, as it moved out of the Australian region with TCWC Brisbane passing the primary warning responsibility for Lisa to the FMS. There was no reports of any significant damage associated with Lisa in either Papua New Guinea, the Solomon Islands or Vanuatu.

=== Other systems ===
During March, 3 significant tropical lows including 15 and 16P were observed within the Coral Sea/Australian region, which did not become tropical cyclones on the Australian scale but were subject to gale warnings. 15P was first noted on 3 March, while it was located about 900 km (560 mi) to the east of the Solomon Islands. Over the next couple of days the system moved towards the south-west, before it moved into the Australian region during 5 March. The system was subsequently designated as Tropical Cyclone 15P by the JTWC who issued two advisories on it, before it was last noted during the next day while it was located about 500 km (310 mi) to the northeast of Mackay, Australia. 16P was first noted within the Australian region on 14 March, while located about 300 km (185 mi) to the southeast of Honiara in the Solomon Islands. Over the next couple of days the system moved towards the south-east before the JTWC designated the system 16P, and initiated advisories on it during 18 March after it had moved into the South Pacific basin. Over the next couple of days the system moved towards the south-southeast before it turned towards the southwest and passed over New Caledonia on 20 March, before it was last noted during the next day as it moved back into the Australian region. Tropical Depression Fatima east of 90°E on 20 March, before crossing the meridian and entering the South West Indian OCean basin on 22 March (midnight UTC).

== Season effects ==
Name	Dates	Peak intensity			Areas affected	Damage (USD)	Deaths	Ref(s).
Name	Dates	Category	Wind speed	Pressure	Areas affected	Damage (USD)	Deaths	Ref(s).
Laurence	8 – 12 December	Category 1 tropical cyclone	65 km/h (40 mph)	992 hPa (29.29 inHg)	None	None	None	
Joy	17 – 27 December	Category 4 severe tropical cyclone	165 km/h (100 mph)	940 hPa (27.76 inHg)	Queensland	63.84	6	
Chris	15 – 21 February	Category 2 tropical cyclone	110 km/h (70 mph)	976 hPa (28.82 inHg)	Western Australia	None	None	
Daphne	24 February – 6 March 1991	Category 2 tropical cyclone	110 km/h (70 mph)	976 hPa (28.82 inHg)	Northern Australia	Unknown	Unknown	
Kelvin	24 February – 5 March	Category 2 tropical cyclone	95 km/h (60 mph)	980 hPa (28.94 inHg)	None	None	None	
Elma	2 – 5 March 1991	Category 2 tropical cyclone	110 km/h (70 mph)	975 hPa (28.79 inHg)	Queensland	None	None	
15P	5 – 7 March	Tropical depression	55 km/h (35 mph)	1000 hPa (29.53 inHg)	None	None	None	
16P	16 – 21 March	Tropical depression	55 km/h (35 mph)	1000 hPa (29.53 inHg)	None	None	None	
Errol	23 – 31 March	Category 4 severe tropical cyclone	175 km/h (110 mph)	950 hPa (28.05 inHg)	None	None	21	
Marian	9 – 19 April	Category 4 severe tropical cyclone	210 km/h (130 mph)	930 hPa (27.46 inHg)	None	None	None	
Fifi	14 – 21 April 1991	Category 2 tropical cyclone	110 km/h (70 mph)	975 hPa (28.79 inHg)	Western Australia	Unknown	Unknown	
Lisa	7 – 11 May 1991	Category 2 tropical cyclone	110 km/h (70 mph)	975 hPa (28.79 inHg)	Papua New Guinea, Solomon Islands; Vanuatu	None	None	
Season aggregates
12 systems	10 December – 19 May		210 km/h (130 mph)	930 hPa (27.46 inHg)		>$63.9 million	56	

== See also ==
- List of Southern Hemisphere tropical cyclone seasons
- Tropical cyclones in 1990 and 1991
- Atlantic hurricane seasons: 1990, 1991
- Pacific hurricane seasons: 1990, 1991
- Pacific typhoon seasons: 1990, 1991
- North Indian Ocean cyclone seasons: 1990, 1991
