= The Worst Day of My Life =

The Worst Day of My Life is an Australian children's television anthology series that first screened on the ABC in 1991–1992.

== Cast ==
- Garry Perazzo as Paul
- Michael Hammett as Guy
- Erica Kennedy as Kerry
- Jim Mckinnon as Tim
- Eamon Kelly as Danny
- Aimee Robertson as Lucy
- Rodney McLennan as Goomy

== Episodes ==
- On The Run
- Out of Your Mind
- Normal
- War and Puss
- Mum's Going To Kill You
- Up The Creek

== See also ==
- List of Australian television series
