= See Jack Run =

- Based on: play Who Cares? by Gillian Wadds
- Written by: Stephen Amis; Robert Gough
- Directed by: Stephen Amis
- Starring: Trent Mooney
- Country of origin: Australia
- Original language: English

Production
- Producer: Roger Gough
- Running time: 73 minutes
- Budget: $97,000

Original release
- Release: 1992

See Jack Run is a 1992 Australian television film about urban teenagers. Directed by Stephen Amis, it stars Trent Mooney.

== Plot ==
In Melbourne's western suburbs, seventeen year old Brian Johnson has an inadequate education and a family involved in crime.

== Cast ==
- Trent Mooney as Brian Johnson
- Molly Brumm as Jan Wilson
- Ellisa Holloway as Karen Molloy

== Release ==
The film screened at the 1994 Melbourne International Film Festival and was nationally screened in Australia on the Channel Nine network.
