= 1991 Darling River cyanobacterial bloom =

Largest algal bloom on record

The 1991 Darling River cyanobacterial bloom is the largest algal bloom on record, of the Barwon-Darling River in New South Wales, Australia.

Parts of the river were sprayed with a Copper based algaecide using a crop duster.
