= 1989 in Australian television =

Below is a list of television-related events in 1989.

== Events ==
- December 1988 / January – Young Talent Time was rested by Network Ten during the Cricket / Australian Open season. One week into January 1989 the network announced that the show would not return. Reasons given for YTT's axing are very bad ratings. It was unable to match its rivals from Seven or Nine.
- January – Nine Network launches two brand new daytime talk shows: In Melbourne Today and In Sydney Today, which later merge to become Ernie and Denise.
- January – Seven Network purchases the Australian television rights to the 1992 Barcelona Olympics for $40 million.
- 13 January – American police drama series Hill Street Blues switches over to broadcast on ABC.
- 25 January – Network Ten debuts a brand new evening drama series: E Street (1989–1993).
- 30 January – Network Ten launches a brand new local morning series called Til Ten (1989–1991) hosted by Andrew Harwood and Joan McInnes.
- 6 February – The Afternoon Show (1987–1993) returns to the ABC for another year with a brand new lineup of two programmes presented by James Valentine. The two programmes include the debut of the British children's animated series Count Duckula and a repeat of the very first episode of Doctor Who to feature Tom Baker, Robot.
- 11 February – Long running Australian soap opera Home and Away starts airing in the UK for the very first time on ITV.
- 13 February – Australian investigative journalism/current affairs program Four Corners (1961–present) returns to the ABC for another year with Andrew Olle as presenter once again.
- 14 February – A brand new Australian sitcom called The Family Business (1989) starring Shane Withington debuts on Network Ten. The series ran for only one season and 13 episodes.
- 14 February – American sitcom Roseanne premieres on Network Ten.
- 28 February – A brand new live comedy series The Big Gig premieres on ABC (1989–1992).
- 28 February – Australian miniseries Edens Lost debuts on ABC at 8:30pm. The series only ran for three episodes and was shown on three days and one week with a budget of only $A3.9 million.
- 6 March – The Adventures of Spot, a British children's animated TV series based on the books by Eric Hill and aimed at pre-schoolers, debuts on the ABC.
- 7 March – Australian drama series G.P. (1989–1996) debuts on the ABC.
- 13 March – Australian version of the children's game show Double Dare (1989–1992) airs on Network Ten.
- 15 March – First episode of the new Australian police drama Police Rescue (1989–1996) airs on the ABC.
- 17 March – Bert Newton hosts the TV Week Logie Awards, telecast on the Seven Network for the first time.
- 20 March – The Bert Newton Show and new soap opera The Power, The Passion launch on the Seven Network, only shown for a few months, but later cancelled after a strong competition win with Midday with Ray Martin.
- 23 March – Long running Australian soap opera Home and Away begins airing on British forces television on BFBS and SSVC Television. The networks have transmitted the show in a range of countries including Germany, Cyprus and the Falkland Islands.
- 31 March – Phase 1 of Aggregation of television services occurs in Southern NSW, with WIN Television becoming a regional Nine Network affiliate, Prime Television becoming the Seven Network affiliate & Capital Television (now Southern Cross Ten) becoming the Network Ten affiliate.
- April – American TV executive Bob Shanks is hired by Network Ten to lift its ailing ratings.
- 12 April – Accident-prone sketch comedy Fast Forward starring Steve Vizard, Marg Downey, Jane Turner, Gina Riley, Magda Szubanski (Kath & Kim) premieres on Seven Network (1989–1992).
- 1 May – Australian children's programme Swap Shop returns to the ABC for a brand new series.
- 6 May – Final episode of the Australian music television series The Factory (1987–1989) is broadcast on the Australian Broadcasting Corporation at 9:00am.
- 8 May – Australian media analysis television program Media Watch (1989–2000, 2002–present) presented by Stuart Littlemore debuts on the ABC airing on Monday nights.
- 8 May – Australian 7 episode sitcom Dearest Enemy starring Grigor Taylor, Frank Wilson and Bruce Spence premieres on ABC.
- 26 May – Neighbours launches a newly revised theme song, with an overload of new cast members who will be "boned" or "suspended" from the soap indefinitely between now and 1994. Between August and November 1989 Neighbours suffered poor ratings with 290,000 national viewers compared to Seven's Home and Away 1,500,000 nationally. The new-look and re-recorded Neighbours theme was again sung by Barry Crocker, which was used until mid-1992.
- 13 June – Australian children's sitcom Pugwall (1989–1991) debuts on the Nine Network.
- 16 June – SBS launches a new television series called Eat Carpet (1989–2005). Hosted by Annette Shun Wah who was also the host of SBS's other television series MC Tee Vee and The Noise
- 3 July – A new nightly version of the former long-running weekly Australian music television show Countdown airs on ABC with a new title Countdown Revolution hosted by Andy McLean, Lisa Collins and Daniel Woods. The show itself received a modest following and was axed the following year.
- 22 July – American animated series ThunderCats airs on Seven Network in Victoria for the first time.
- 23 July – Network Ten is relaunched as 10 TV Australia, introducing a new lineup with increased game show content. Most of the new shows are axed by the end of the year following poor ratings.
- 29 July – Australian game show The Price is Right, again hosted by Ian Turpie, returns to television airing on 10 TV Australia at 7:30pm on Saturdays as part of the network's attempted revamp. Despite the show returning, only 12 episodes were lasted in the face of stiff competition of AFL coverage on most-watched rival Channel Seven.
- 9 August – Greek-Australian sitcom, Acropolis Now premieres on Seven Network in Australia (1989–1992).
- September – Network Ten is sold to Steve Cosser, head of Broadcom Australia, for $22 million.
- 9 October – Neighbours, Australian television's long running soap opera has been snapped up for television broadcasting in Germany when the series begins airing on Sat. 1 with the title beginning translated to Nachbarn.
- 14 October – After very nasty ratings, the final episode of the Australian game show The Price is Right airs on 10 TV Australia.
- 21 October – British science fiction sitcom Red Dwarf premieres on ABC.
- 22 October – The 1985 film Back to the Future starring Michael J. Fox and Christopher Lloyd premieres on 10 TV Australia.
- November – Jacki MacDonald quits Hey Hey It's Saturday after 11 years. McDonald is replaced by Denise Drysdale when the show returns in 1990.
- 17 November – Australian dating game show Perfect Match airs its final episode on 10 TV Australia. The show was cancelled due to poor ratings, failing to match the success of its 1984 series, which broke records for 5:30pm.
- December – The Seven Network wins the 1989 ratings year with a record of 34.0% share.
- 5 December – Australian soap opera Home and Away begins its very first broadcast in New Zealand on the country's already newly launched channel TV3.
- 16 December – The late Australian rock musician Brad Robinson of Australian Crawl fame presents a brand new Australia music program on 10 TV Australia called Spin.
- 31 December – Phase 2 of Aggregation of Television services occurs in Orange & Wagga Wagga, with aggregation occurring in Wollongong and Canberra in March.

== Television ==
=== Debuts ===
Program	Network	Debut date
E Street	Network Ten	25 January
Til Ten	Network Ten	30 January
Australia's Most Wanted	Seven Network	5 February
Tanamera – Lion of Singapore	Network Ten	7 February
The Family Business	Network Ten	14 February
Edens Lost	ABC TV	28 February
The Big Gig	ABC TV	28 February
G.P.	ABC TV	7 March
Double Dare	Network Ten	13 March
Police Rescue	ABC TV	15 March
The Bert Newton Show	Seven Network	20 March
The Power, The Passion	Seven Network	20 March
Couchman	ABC TV	12 April
Fast Forward	Seven Network	12 April
Living with the Law	ABC TV	24 April
Media Watch	ABC TV	8 May
Dearest Enemy	ABC TV	8 May
This Man... This Woman	ABC TV	24 May
Bunyip	ABC TV	5 June
Pugwall	Nine Network	13 June
Eat Carpet	SBS TV	16 June
Club 10	Network Ten	17 June
Countdown Revolution	ABC TV	3 July
Shadow of the Cobra	Seven Network	23 July
Family Double Dare	10 TV Australia	24 July
Candid Camera on Australia	10 TV Australia	25 July
Superquiz	10 TV Australia	25 July
Happy Hatchday to Plasmo	ABC TV	4 August
Acropolis Now	Seven Network	9 August
Naked Under Capricorn	Nine Network	17 September
Cassidy	ABC TV	25 October
Bangkok Hilton	10 TV Australia	5 November
Grim Pickings	Nine Network	15 November
Spin	10 TV Australia	16 December
Bright Sparks	Unknown	1989

=== New international programming ===
Program	Network	Debut date
(United Kingdom) Lost Belongings	ABC TV	2 January
(United States) Global Rivals	SBS TV	3 January
(United Kingdom) Intimate Contact	Network Ten	3 January
(United Kingdom) Talking Animals	ABC TV	4 January
(United States) Brown Sugar	SBS TV	4 January
(United Kingdom) How to Be Celtic	SBS TV	22 January
(New Zealand) The Fire-Raiser	ABC TV	30 January
(United States) Kids Incorporated	Seven Network	30 January
(United States) Fast Times	Network Ten	5 February
(United States) The Munsters Today	Network Ten	5 February
(United Kingdom) Count Duckula	ABC TV	6 February
(United Kingdom) Home James!	ABC TV	6 February
(United States) China Beach	Nine Network	6 February
(United States) Wiseguy	Nine Network	7 February
(United States) Empty Nest	Seven Network	10 February
(Canada) Bizarre	Network Ten	13 February
(United States) Roseanne	Network Ten	14 February
(United States) Mission: Impossible (1988)	Nine Network	16 February
(Czechoslovakia) Roby and Boby on the Roads	ABC TV	18 February
(United States) Thirtysomething	Network Ten	21 February
(Sweden) Vicky the Viking	ABC TV	23 February
(United States) Billionaire Boys Club	Seven Network	27 February
(Germany) Topsy Turvy	SBS TV	1 March
(United Kingdom) Floyd on Britain and Ireland	SBS TV	4 March
(Canada) Concerto Grosso Modo	ABC TV	6 March
(United Kingdom) The Adventures of Spot	ABC TV	6 March
(France) / (Japan) / (Switzerland) / (Italy) Once Upon a Time... Life	SBS TV	10 March
(United Kingdom) Henry's Leg	ABC TV	20 March
(United States) Storybreak	ABC TV	21 March
(United States) It's Garry Shandling's Show	Nine Network	22 March
(United States) The Bronx Zoo	Network Ten	29 March
(United States) / (United Kingdom) Jack the Ripper (1988)	Seven Network	2 April
(United States) Of Pure Blood	Nine Network	5 April
(United States) Rags to Riches	Network Ten	8 April
(United States) War and Remembrance	Network Ten	9 April
(United States) Midnight Caller	Seven Network	12 April
(United Kingdom) Tripper's Day	ABC TV	23 April
(United Kingdom) Blind Justice	ABC TV	30 April
(United Kingdom) Aliens in the Family (1987)	ABC TV	2 May
(United Kingdom) The Thatcher Factor	SBS TV	4 May
(United Kingdom) White Peak Farm	ABC TV	10 May
(Canada) Danger Bay	ABC TV	16 May
(United States) Mama's Boy	Nine Network	27 May
(Hong Kong) Pet and Pest	SBS TV	2 June
(United Kingdom) The Secret World of Polly Flint	ABC TV	5 June
(Czechoslovakia) Safari	SBS TV	14 June
(France) The Image in the Mirror	SBS TV	14 June
(Sweden) Xerxes	SBS TV	15 June
(United Kingdom) Lizzie's Pictures	ABC TV	18 June
(Italy) Mother Again	SBS TV	20 June
(Greece) The Other Side of the River	SBS TV	20 June
(United Kingdom) Dead Head	ABC TV	21 June
(United States) Mr. Belvedere	Seven Network	21 June
(United Kingdom) Codename: Kyril	Seven Network	25 June
(United Kingdom) Farrington of the F.O.	Seven Network	29 June
(United States) Dr. Fad	Network Ten	3 July
(United States) Eisenhower and Lutz	Network Ten	7 July
(United States) The New Mike Hammer	Nine Network	13 July
(Spain) / (Netherlands) The World of David the Gnome	ABC TV	14 July
(United States) Full House	Seven Network	14 July
(United Kingdom) Hannay	ABC TV	15 July
(United States) Superboy	Nine Network	17 July
(United States) The Wonder Years	10 TV Australia	24 July
(United States) Quantum Leap	10 TV Australia	24 July
(Netherlands) Rising Waters	SBS TV	25 July
(United Kingdom) Supersense	ABC TV	27 July
(United States) Just the Ten of Us	Nine Network	1 August
(United States) Teen Wolf	Nine Network	5 August
(United Kingdom) The Road to War: Great Britain, Italy, Japan, USA	ABC TV	6 August
(Italy) The Kids in 12C	SBS TV	7 August
(Germany) The Show with the Mouse	ABC TV	10 August
(United States) Superman	Nine Network	12 August
(Canada) / (United States) My Pet Monster	Seven Network	13 August
(United Kingdom) Odysseus: The Greatest Hero of Them All	ABC TV	16 August
(United States) AlfTales	Seven Network	27 August
(United Kingdom) / (Australia) The Heroes	10 TV Australia	27 August
(Canada) Diamonds	Seven Network	28 August
(United Kingdom) Big World Cafe	SBS TV	1 September
(United States) Lonesome Dove	Seven Network	4 September
(United States) Everything's Relative	10 TV Australia	8 September
(United Kingdom) London Embassy	ABC TV	10 September
(Canada) Ramona	ABC TV	11 September
(United States) Baby Boom	Seven Network	11 September
(United Kingdom) Out to Tuesday	SBS TV	12 September
(Canada) Just for Laughs	ABC TV	14 September
(Malta) The Maltese	SBS TV	16 September
(Canada) T. and T.	Seven Network	18 September
(United Kingdom) The Bell	Seven Network	21 September
(Canada) My Secret Identity	10 TV Australia	21 September
(United States) Hollywood Legends	ABC TV	23 September
(United States) C.O.P.S.	Nine Network	23 September
(United States) Dennis the Menace (1986)	ABC TV	2 October
(United States) The Van Dyke Show	10 TV Australia	5 October
(United Kingdom) Tickets for the Titanic	SBS TV	8 October
(United States) Brotherhood of the Rose	Seven Network	8 October
(United States) Around the World in 80 Days	Nine Network	8 October
(United States) High Mountain Rangers	10 TV Australia	8 October
(United States) Denver, the Last Dinosaur	Nine Network	9 October
(United Kingdom) Running Scared	ABC TV	12 October
(United States) Raising Miranda	10 TV Australia	14 October
(United States) The Oldest Rookie	Seven Network	15 October
(United Kingdom) Red Dwarf	ABC TV	21 October
(United Kingdom) City Tails	ABC TV	25 October
(United States) Windmills of the Gods	Seven Network	29 October
(United Kingdom) A Very British Coup	Seven Network	9 November
(Australia) / (Italy) The Magistrate	ABC TV	15 November
(United States) Hello Kitty's Furry Tale Theater	Seven Network	19 November
(United States) Paradise	Seven Network	19 November
(United States) Aaron's Way	ABC TV	19 November
(Canada) / (France) The Smoggies	ABC TV	20 November
(United Kingdom) The Ratties	ABC TV	20 November
(United States) Married... with Children	10 TV Australia	20 November
(United States) Unsub	Nine Network	21 November
(United States) Sonny Spoon	Nine Network	22 November
(United Kingdom) Miss Marple	Seven Network	22 November
(United States) Tattingers	Nine Network	23 November
(United Kingdom) Dear John (UK)	Seven Network	23 November
(United Kingdom) Pulaski: The TV Detective	ABC TV	25 November
(United States) The Wizard	10 TV Australia	26 November
(United Kingdom) Chelmsford 123	ABC TV	28 November
(United States) TV 101	10 TV Australia	28 November
(United States) Buck James	Nine Network	29 November
(United States) Private Eye	10 TV Australia	29 November
(United Kingdom) After Henry	ABC TV	1 December
(United Kingdom) Andy Capp	Seven Network	4 December
(United Kingdom) Game, Set and Match	ABC TV	6 December
(United Kingdom) Vanity Fair (1989)	ABC TV	9 December
(United States) Knightwatch	Seven Network	10 December
(United States) Dirty Dancing	Seven Network	11 December
(United Kingdom) Cover Her Face	Nine Network	11 December
(United States) Leg Work	10 TV Australia	14 December
(United Kingdom) Simon and the Witch	ABC TV	18 December
(United States) Secrets & Mysteries	Nine Network	18 December
(United States) Square One Television	ABC TV	18 December
(United Kingdom) Death of an Expert Witness	Seven Network	18 December
(United Kingdom) Billy's Christmas Angels	ABC TV	25 December
(United States) Nearly Departed	Seven Network	26 December
(Canada) Night Heat	Seven Network	26 December

=== Changes to network affiliation ===
This is a list of programs which made their premiere on an Australian television network that had previously premiered on another Australian television network. The networks involved in the switch of allegiances are predominantly both free-to-air networks or both subscription television networks. Programs that have their free-to-air/subscription television premiere, after previously premiering on the opposite platform (free-to air to subscription/subscription to free-to air) are not included. In some cases, programs may still air on the original television network. This occurs predominantly with programs shared between subscription television networks.

==== Domestic ====
Program	New network(s)	Previous network(s)	Date
The Price Is Right	10 TV Australia	Seven Network	29 July

==== International ====
Program	New network(s)	Previous network(s)	Date
(United States) Hill Street Blues	ABC TV	Nine Network	13 January
(United States) Gumby	ABC TV	Seven Network	20 February
(United Kingdom) Minder	Seven Network	ABC TV	2 May
(United States) / (Japan) ThunderCats	Seven Network (Victoria)	10 TV Australia (Victoria)	22 July
(United States) Miami Vice	10 TV Australia	Nine Network	30 August
(United States) The Abbott and Costello Cartoon Show	ABC TV	10 TV Australia	9 October
(United Kingdom) Floyd on Fish	ABC TV	SBS TV	13 October
(New Zealand) Sea Urchins	10 TV Australia	ABC TV	1989

== Television shows ==
=== 1950s ===
- Mr. Squiggle and Friends (1959–1999)

=== 1960s ===
- Four Corners (1961–present)

=== 1970s ===
- Hey Hey It's Saturday (1971–1999)
- 60 Minutes (1979–present)

=== 1980s ===
- Sale of the Century (1980–2001)
- Wheel of Fortune (1981–1996, 1996–2003, 2004–08)
- Sunday (1981–2008)
- The Price is Right (1981–1985, 1989, 1993–1998, 2003–2005, 2012)
- Today (1982–present)
- Neighbours (1985–present)
- The Flying Doctors (1986–1993)
- Rage (1987–present)
- Home and Away (1988–present)
- Seven's Super Saturday (1988–1990)
- The Comedy Company (1988–1990)
- Fast Forward (1989–1992)
- The Big Gig (1989–1991)
- G.P. (1989–1996)
- Til Ten (1989–1991)

== Ending this year ==
Date	Show	Channel	Debut
January	Young Talent Time	Network Ten	1971
19 January	University Challenge	ABC TV	1987
31 January	Rock Arena	ABC TV	1982
3 February	Earthwatch	ABC TV	1979
4 February	Rock Arena	ABC TV	1982
15 February	Tanamera – Lion of Singapore	Network Ten	7 February 1989
24 February	Ridgey Didge	Network Ten	1987
2 March	Edens Lost	ABC TV	28 February 1989
14 March	The Family Business	Network Ten	14 February 1989
6 May	The Factory	ABC TV	1987
9 June	Swap Shop	ABC TV	1988
10 June	The Early Bird Show	Network Ten	1985
16 June	The Oz Game	ABC TV	1988
22 June	Richmond Hill	Network Ten	1988
30 June	Bunyip	ABC TV	5 June 1989
7 August	Family Double Dare	10 TV Australia	24 July 1989
26 August	Club 10	10 TV Australia	17 June 1989
14 October	The Price Is Right	10 TV Australia	29 July 1989
17 November	Perfect Match	10 TV Australia	1984
16 November	Grim Pickings	Nine Network	15 November 1989
17 November	The Bert Newton Show	Seven Network	20 March 1989

== Returning this year ==
Date	Show	Channel	Debut
29 July	The Price Is Right	10 TV Australia	1981

== See also ==
- 1989 in Australia
- List of Australian films of 1989
