= 1989 in Australia =

- Monarch: Elizabeth II
- Governor-General: Sir Ninian Stephen, then Bill Hayden
- Prime minister: Bob Hawke
- Population: 16,814,416
- Elections: WA, ACT, TAS, SA, QLD

The following lists events that happened during 1989 in Australia.

- Decades: 1960s; 1970s; 1980s; 1990s; 2000s
- See also: 1989 in Australian television; 1989 in Australian literature; Other events of 1989; Timeline of Australian history

== Incumbents ==
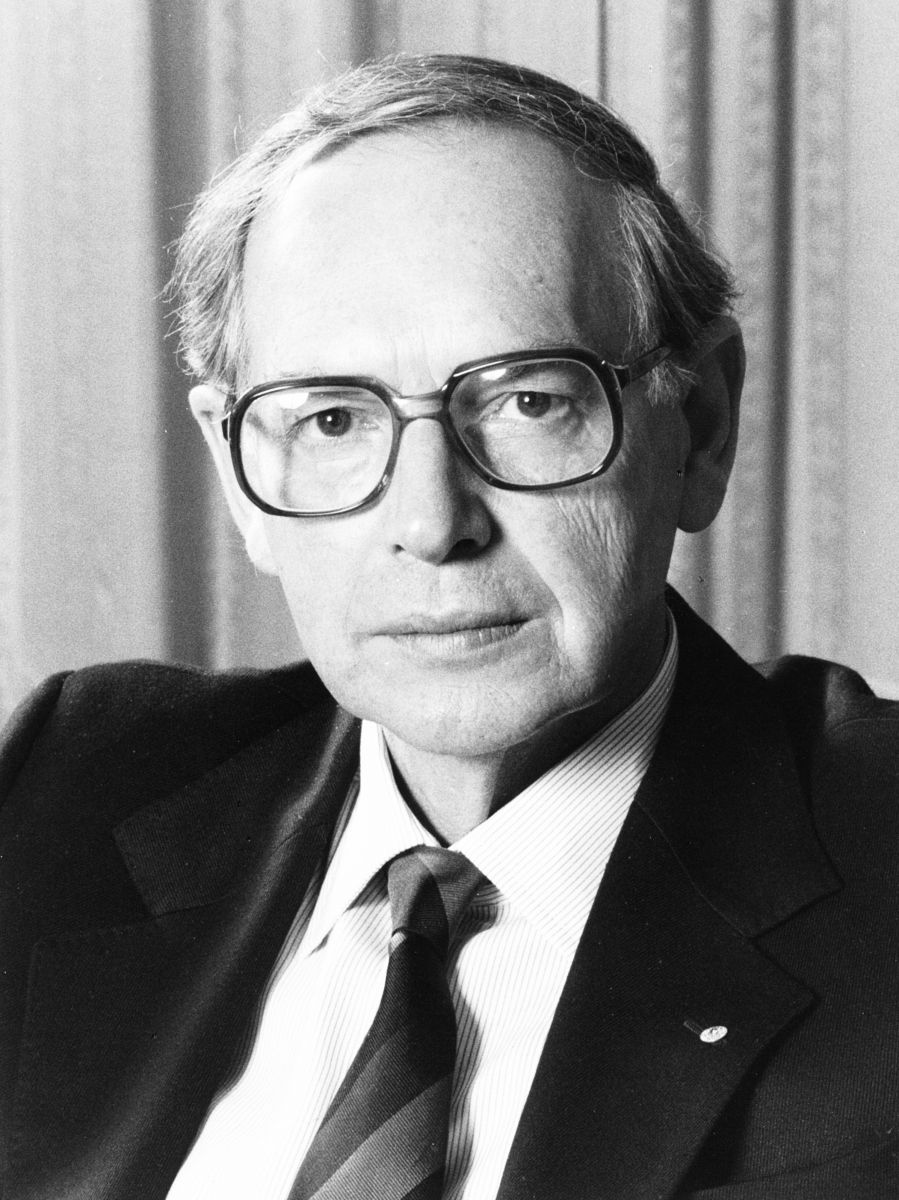
Sir Ninian Stephen

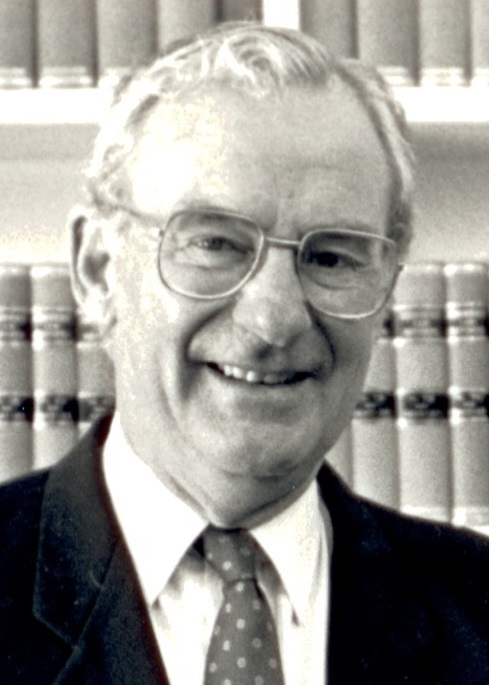
Bill Hayden

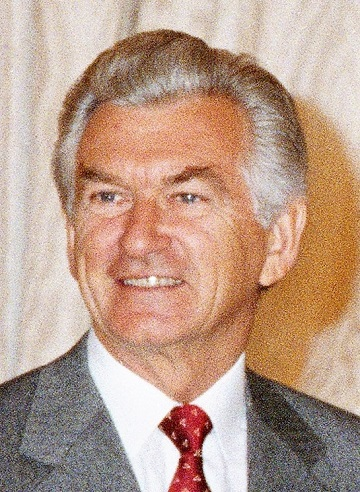
Bob Hawke

- Monarch – Elizabeth II
- Governor-General – Sir Ninian Stephen (until 16 February), then Bill Hayden
- Prime Minister – Bob Hawke
  - Deputy Prime Minister – Lionel Bowen
  - Opposition Leader – John Howard (until 9 May), then Andrew Peacock
- Chief Justice – Sir Anthony Mason

=== State and territory leaders ===
- Premier of New South Wales – Nick Greiner
  - Opposition Leader – Bob Carr
- Premier of Queensland – Mike Ahern (until 25 September), then Russell Cooper (until 7 December), then Wayne Goss
  - Opposition Leader – Wayne Goss (until 7 December), then Russell Cooper
- Premier of South Australia – John Bannon
  - Opposition Leader – John Olsen
- Premier of Tasmania – Robin Gray (until 29 June), then Michael Field
  - Opposition Leader – Michael Field (until 29 June), then Robin Gray
- Premier of Victoria – John Cain Jr.
  - Opposition Leader – Jeff Kennett (until 23 May), then Alan Brown
- Premier of Western Australia – Peter Dowding
  - Opposition Leader – Barry MacKinnon
- Chief Minister of the Australian Capital Territory – Rosemary Follett (from 11 May, until 5 December), then Trevor Kaine
  - Opposition Leader – Trevor Kaine (from 11 May, until 5 December), then Rosemary Follett
- Chief Minister of the Northern Territory – Marshall Perron
  - Opposition Leader – Terry Smith
- President of the Legislative Assembly of Norfolk Island – John Brown (until 22 May), then David Buffett

=== Governors and administrators ===
- Governor of New South Wales – Sir James Rowland (until 20 January), then Sir David Martin
- Governor of Queensland – Sir Walter Campbell
- Governor of South Australia – Sir Donald Dunstan
- Governor of Tasmania – Sir Phillip Bennett
- Governor of Victoria – Davis McCaughey
- Governor of Western Australia – Gordon Reid (until 30 September)
- Administrator of Norfolk Island – William Campbell (until 12 April), then Herbert MacDonald
- Administrator of the Northern Territory – Eric Johnston (until 1 July), then James Muirhead

== Events ==
=== January ===
- 1 January – HECS is introduced with the commencement of the Higher Education Funding Act 1988.
- 10 January –
  - Assistant Australian Federal Police commissioner Colin Winchester is shot dead in the driveway of his Canberra home by a sniper, later identified as David Harold Eastman.
  - The Tasmanian Parliament is recalled to debate guidelines for the Wesley Vale pulp mill.
- 31 January – Victorian Deputy Premier Robert Fordham resigns under pressure from the factions and Opposition over his handling of the VEDC fiasco. Roger Pescott narrowly defeats Alan Stockdale in the final ballot for the position of deputy.

=== February ===
- 4 February – The 1989 Western Australian state election is held. Peter Dowding returns as Premier when the Labor Party wins 31 seats albeit with a 10% fall in votes.
- 7 February – Joan Kirner becomes Victoria's (and Australia's) first female deputy premier after the resignation of Robert Fordham over the VEDC (Victorian Economic Development Corporation) crisis.

=== March ===
- 1 March – The Industrial Relations Commission replaces the Australian Conciliation & Arbitration Commission.
- 4 March – The first Australian Capital Territory election is held.
- 20 March – Prime Minister Bob Hawke weeps on national television, as he admits marital infidelity.
- 21 March – Federal Cabinet decides to develop a third runway at Sydney's congested airport, leading to outraged protests from residents' groups and the sudden resignation from the Federal Ministry of Gary Punch whose marginal electorate of Barton bordered the airport.
- 22 March – The Victorian Division of the National Safety Council collapses with debts of $235 million.

=== April ===
- 5 April – CEO of the Victorian Division of the National Safety Council John Friedrichs is captured after 17 days on the run.
- 15 April – John Anderson wins the 1989 Gwydir by-election, unopposed by either Labor or Liberal, after the retirement of National Party Deputy Leader Ralph Hunt. Apart from Anderson, two far-right independent candidates are the only people to contest the by-election.
- 27 April – A dawn raid by the Tactical Response Group kills innocent Aboriginal Redfern resident David Gundy and arouses community anger. An inquiry into Gundy's death adds to already existing distrust of the police.

=== May ===
- 6 May – Liberal Ian Macphee loses pre-selection for his seat of Goldstein in favour of hardliner David Kemp, amid accusations of branch-stacking and foul play.
- 9 May –
  - Andrew Peacock deposes John Howard as Federal Opposition Leader and Leader of the Liberal Party by a clear vote of 44 to 27. Senator Fred Chaney is elected as Deputy Leader.
  - Charles Blunt replaces Ian Sinclair as National Party of Australia Leader in a spill precipitated by tensions over deregulation of the wheat industry.
  - Serafettin Huseyin kidnaps a group of kindergarten children, douses them in petrol and holds them hostage in a toilet cubicle at the Manresa Kindergarten in Hawthorn. After a ten-day trial in February 1990, Huseyin is found guilty by a jury of 37 charges including 23 of false imprisonment. He is subsequently sentenced to 21 years in prison, although he unsuccessfully attempts to have the conviction overturned.
- 11 May –
  - The ACT Legislative Assembly meets for the first time.
  - In the Harris-Daishowa affair, state Australian Labor Party General Secretary Stephen Loosley is convicted of not declaring a $10,000 donation from the wood chipping company.
- 13 May –
  - Liberal candidate Robin Gray wins the 1989 Tasmanian state election. The Liberal Party secures 46.9% of the vote, while the Labor Party secures 34.7% and the Green Independents 17.1%.
  - Queensland National Party MP Santo Santoro wins the 1989 Merthyr state by-election.
- 15 May – Australia's first private tertiary institution, Bond University, opens on the Gold Coast.
- 16 May – Plotters of the Liberal leadership coup appear on the ABC TV's Four Corners hindering Andrew Peacock's attempts to unify the party.
- 18 May – At the Premiers' Conference, the Commonwealth cuts $550 million from payments, grants and loans to the states.
- 23 May – Victorian Liberal Leader Jeff Kennett is replaced by Alan Brown in the fifth challenge to his leadership since 1982.
- 29 May – The Australian Labor Party in Tasmania signs the Labor–Green Accord with the Tasmanian Greens to form government.
- 30 May – Ananda Marga member Tim Anderson is arrested on charges related to the 1978 Hilton bombing.

=== June ===
- 23 June – Vacancies caused by the departure to federal politics of New South Wales MPs Laurie Brereton, Laurie Ferguson and Janice Crosio see Labor retain the seats of Heffron, Granville and Smithfield.

=== July ===
- 3 July – Findings from the Fitzgerald Inquiry are released in Queensland.
- 16 July – The Victorian state Australian Labor Party conference chooses Jenny Doran as its first female President.
- July - Interest rates on home mortgages reach 17%.

=== August ===
- 9 August – The Victorian Government releases its Budget, proposing further savage cuts to the public sector due to the decreasing amount of Commonwealth funding available.
- 13 August – Thirteen people die in a hot air balloon accident near Alice Springs, Northern Territory.
- 22 August – The damaging 2-month airline pilots' strike over a 30% pay rise begins in earnest. Prime Minister Bob Hawke makes a crusade of resisting the claim.
- 23 August – All of Australia's 1,645 domestic airline pilots resign over an airline's move to sack and sue them over a dispute, following a strike.

=== September ===
- 17 September – Six people die in the Downunder Hostel fire in Sydney's Kings Cross.
- 22 September – Queensland Emergency and Administrative Services Minister Russell Cooper becomes Queensland Premier after beating Mike Ahern in his second leadership attempt. Bill Gunn remains Deputy Premier.

=== October ===
- 11 October – Media magnate Rupert Murdoch criticises Andrew Peacock as having a poor standing as Opposition Leader.
- 17 October – New South Wales Premier Nick Greiner announces a Royal Commission under Mr. Justice Lee to investigate the case of Police Chief Superintendent Harry Blackburn who had been arrested and charged with sexual offences allegedly committed over a 20-year period. After several months, it was found that he had no case to answer.
- 20 October – Grafton bus crash – 21 people are killed and 22 are injured when a tourist bus collides with a semi-trailer on the Pacific Highway near Grafton.
- 22 October – The first Pride March is held at Parliament House, Perth as a rally in support of homosexual law reform (currently being debated in the West Australian Parliament).
- 25 October – In response to the Fitzgerald Inquiry recommendations, the Queensland Government establishes two new bodies - the Criminal Justice Commission (CJC) to be headed by former NCA Commissioner Sir Max Bingham and the Electoral and Administrative Review Commission (EARC) under Tom Sherman.

=== November ===
- 10 November – Gaby Kennard becomes the first Australian woman to fly non-stop around the world.
- 25 November – Elections in South Australia narrowly return the Labor government of John Bannon to power.

=== December ===
- 2 December – The 1989 Queensland state election is held. After 32 years in power, 19 of those under Sir Joh Bjelke-Petersen, the National Party government is voted out of office in Queensland amid widespread allegations of corruption & is replaced by the Australian Labor Party. led by Wayne Goss. The Labor Party wins 54 seats with 50.3% of the vote. The Nationals retain 26 seats with 24.1% of the vote while the Liberal Party wins only 9 seats with 21.1% of the vote.
- 5 December – Five former Queensland ministers are charged with misuse of public money. Special prosecutor Doug Drummond, QC, had summonses issued against Don Lane, Brian Austin, Ivan Gibbs, Geoff Muntz and Leisha Harvey.
- 7 December – The Law Reform (Decriminalisation of Sodomy) Act 1989, decriminalising private sexual acts between two people of the same sex in Western Australia, is passed by the West Australian Parliament (going into effect in March 1990).
- 22 December –
  - Kempsey bus crash – Two tourist coaches collide on the Pacific Highway north of Kempsey, New South Wales, 35 are killed and 39 injured. Both the Grafton and Kempsey bus crashes led to calls to make the Pacific Highway dual carriageway.
  - One of the few successful Australian Democrats Bills is passed through the House of Representatives on the voices. It outlaws the advertising of tobacco products in the print media.
- 25 December – A savage storm rips through Brisbane and Redcliffe, leaving a $5 million trail of destruction. Two people are killed, around 1,000 homes are damaged and about 4,500 homes suffer loss of electric power.
- 28 December – A magnitude 5.6 earthquake hits Newcastle, New South Wales, killing 13 people.

=== Unknown dates ===
- The Independent Commission Against Corruption (ICAC) is established in New South Wales.
- Western Australia decriminalises homosexual acts between consenting adults.
- Alan Bond's Bond Corporation goes into receivership with the largest debt in Australian history.
- Arrow Research Corporation established.

== Arts and literature ==
- Peter Carey's novel Oscar and Lucinda wins the Miles Franklin Award

== Film ==
- Dead Calm
- The Delinquents
- Sweetie

== Television ==
- January – Young Talent Time is cancelled before the new series goes to air.
- 31 March – Phase 1 of Aggregation of television services occurs in Southern NSW, with WIN Television becoming a regional Nine Network affiliate, Prime Television becoming the Seven Network affiliate & Capital Television (now Southern Cross Ten) becoming the Network Ten affiliate.
- 12 April – Fast Forward premieres in Australia (1989–1992).
- June – Neighbours introduces a new look theme song. The theme is sung by Barry Crocker when it lasted until the end of 1994.
- July – Bob Shanks takes over as managing director of Network Ten due to ailing ratings & totally revamps the network, giving it the name 10 TV Australia as well as introducing a new lineup with increased game show content. Most of the new shows are axed by the end of the year.
- August – Acropolis Now premieres in Australia (1989–1992).
- September – Network Ten is sold to Steve Cosser, head of Broadcom Australia, for $22 million.
- 31 December – Phase 2 of Aggregation of Television services occurs in Orange & Wagga Wagga, with aggregation occurring in Wollongong & Canberra in March
- The Big Gig premieres in Australia (1989–1992).

== Sport ==
- 13 March – NSWRL unveils massive advertising campaign featuring rock legend Tina Turner singing What You Get is What You See.
- 17 March – First day of the Australian Track & Field Championships for the 1988–1989 season, which are held at the QEII Stadium in Brisbane, Queensland.
- 23 July – Bradley Camp wins the men's national marathon title, clocking 2:10:10 in Brisbane, while Jan Federick claims the women's title in 2:51:30.
- 11 August – Canterbury Bulldogs & Canberra Raiders meet at the WACA Ground in Perth in the first NSWRL match played outside the eastern states. On the same day, it is announced that the VFL will become known as the AFL from next season.
- 13 August – Marconi Fairfield win the NSL with a 2–0 victory over Sydney Olympic, in the last season to be played in traditional Winter format.
- 24 September – Canberra Raiders upset Balmain Tigers 19–14 in extra time at the Sydney Football Stadium (now Aussie Stadium) to win one of the most dramatic & exciting grand finals ever & take the NSWRL premiership outside Sydney for the first time. Raiders lock Bradley Clyde is awarded the Clive Churchill medal for man of the match. Illawarra Steelers finish in last position, claiming the wooden spoon.
- 30 September – Hawthorn (21.18.144) defeat Geelong (21.12.138) to win the 93rd and indeed final VFL premiership until 1996, when the VFA would become known as the VFL.
- Brownlow Medal awarded to Paul Couch (Geelong).
- Cricket – Australia regains The Ashes on English soil for the first time in 40 years defeating England 4–0 in the 6 test series.

== Births ==
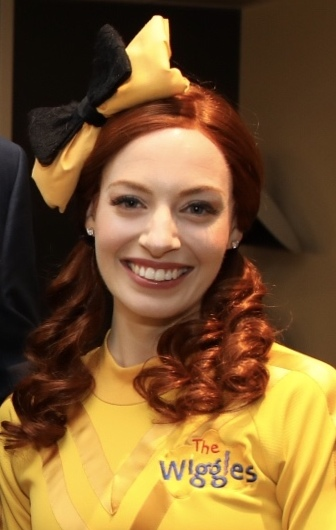
Emma Watkins

- 8 January – Oliver Bozanic, footballer
- 9 January – Chris Sandow, rugby league player
- 10 January – Kyle Reimers, Australian rules footballer
- 11 January – Kane Linnett, rugby league player
- 15 January – Ryan Corr, actor
- 1 February – Steven Browne, Australian rules footballer
- 4 February – Kevin Naiqama, Australian-Fijian rugby league player
- 7 February – Jake Granville, rugby league player
- 8 February
  - Chai Hansen, Thai-born actor
  - Bronte Barratt, swimmer
- 10 February – Liam Hendriks, baseball player
- 13 February – Rhys Palmer, footballer
- 17 February
  - Jake Marketo, rugby league player
  - Tom Symonds, rugby league player
- 20 February – Daly Cherry-Evans, rugby league player
- 25 February – Hayden Doyle, soccer player
- 15 March – Bryce Gibbs, Australian rules footballer
- 24 March – James Sellar, Australian rules footballer
- 24 March – Aziz Shavershian, Australian bodybuilder (d. 2011)
- 4 April – Chris Herd, soccer player
- 6 April – Gabrielle Scollay, actress
- 11 April – Eka Darville, actor
- 20 April – Amy Steel, netballer
- 21 April – Jayson Bukuya, Australian-Fijian rugby league player
- 26 April – Luke Bracey, actor
- 27 April – Tim Glasby, rugby league player
- 11 May – Jack Grimes, Australian rules footballer
- 14 May – Alexandra Park, actress
- 15 May – James Holland, soccer player
- 30 May – Catherine McNeil, fashion model
- 31 May – Chase Stanley, Australian-New Zealand rugby league player
- 2 June – Steve Smith, cricketer
- 7 June – Mitch Robinson, Australian footballer
- 9 June – Josephine Tomic, racing cyclist
- 12 June – Shane Lowry, soccer player
- 13 June – Ben Barba, rugby league footballer
- 1 July – Daniel Ricciardo, racecar driver
- 12 July – Phoebe Tonkin, actress (H_{2}O: Just Add Water)
- 13 July – Jack Bobridge, racing cyclist
- 18 July – Sebastian Ryall, soccer player
- 27 July – Talia Zucker, actress
- 4 August
  - Dajana Cahill, actress
  - Jessica Mauboy, actress and singer-songwriter (Young Divas)
- 10 August – Brenton Thwaites, actor
- 15 August – Ryan McGowan, soccer player
- 19 September – Kimberly Mason, rhythmic gymnast
- 21 September – Emma Watkins, singer and actress (The Wiggles)
- 22 September – Renee Rollason, soccer player
- 16 October – Angie Bainbridge, swimmer
- 17 October – Sophie Luck, actress
- 18 October – Leigh Howard, racing cyclist
- 24 October – Eliza Taylor, actress
- 26 October – Daniel Mullen, soccer player
- 2 November – Chris Winter, television presenter and reporter
- 9 November – Lucinda Whitty, sailor
- 10 November – Andrew James Morley, actor
- 25 November – Basia A'Hern, actress
- 10 December – Tom Sexton, Australian-Irish rugby player
- 22 December – Jared Petrenko, Australian rules footballer
- 22 December – Jharal Yow Yeh, rugby league footballer
- 31 December – Brydan Klein, tennis player

=== Full date unknown ===
- Blair Cottrell, far right activist

== Deaths ==
- 31 May – Malcolm Scott, Western Australian politician (b. 1911)
- 12 June – Bruce Hamilton, public servant (b. 1911)
- 11 August – John Meillon, actor (b. 1934)
- 16 August – Donald Friend, artist and diarist (b. 1915)
- 26 October – Gordon Reid, 26th Governor of Western Australia (b. 1923)

== See also ==
- 1989 in Australian television
- List of Australian films of 1989
