= Taryn Marler =

Australian actress

- Born: Taryn Natalie Marler; September 1, 1988 (age 37); Brisbane, Queensland, Australia
- Occupation(s): Actress, director, writer
- Years active: 2006–present

Taryn Natalie Marler (born 1 September 1988) is an Australian actress.

== Biography ==
Marler is best known for her role on Blue Water High as Rachel Samuels which was filmed in 2006. She was also in the short film Car Pool as Chrissy Clapton.

Marler met up with her Blue Water High co-stars Sophie Luck, Lesley Anne Mitchell and Gabrielle Scollay in early 2006. Taryn has also taken part in Rove McManus's stand-up comedy show in a 'Benny Hill' style skit, as a nurse in his 2008 tour.

Marler was later cast in series three of H_{2}O: Just Add Water as Sophie Benjamin, a recurring character who is very involved in her younger brother Will's success as a free diver. She also causes much misfortune to the mermaids and is viewed primarily as a negative character. She also had a brief cameo in series two of H_{2}O: Just Add Water as Julia, a mermaid from 50 years before the main protagonists' time (she replaced Amrita Tarr in this role).

== Filmography ==
Year	Title	Role	Notes
2006	Car Pool	Chrissy Clapton	TV short
2006	Blue Water High	Rachel Samuels	TV series, 26 episodes
2008–2010	H_{2}O: Just Add Water	Sophie Benjamin / Julia	TV series, 18 episodes
2009	In Her Skin	Jenny	Film
2016	Sea Monsters	Sally	TV short
2017	The Hamster Snatcher	Madeleine	TV short
2021	In Extremis	News Anchor (voice)	TV short
2021	Choices	Mona	TV short
