= Scherzinger =

Scherzinger is a German surname. Notable people with the surname include:

- Mara Scherzinger (born 1989), German actress
- Nicole Scherzinger (born 1978), American singer

== See also ==
- Victor Schertzinger (1888–1941), American composer, film director, film producer, and screenwriter
