= In Her Skin =

2009 Australian film

- Directed by: Simone North
- Written by: Simone North
- Based on: Perfect Victim by Elizabeth Southall and Megan Norris
- Produced by: Tony Cavanagh; Executive: Maureen Barron; Catriona Hughes; Jason Moody; John Keating; Leesa Kahn
- Starring: Guy Pearce; Miranda Otto; Kate Bell; Khan Chittenden; Sam Neill; Rebecca Gibney; Ruth Bradley; Jack Finsterer; Robert Braiden; Jerome Velinsky; Paul Bishop
- Production companies: Screen Australia; Liberty Films International
- Distributed by: Goldcrest Films (international)
- Release date: 2009; 2013 (Australian pay TV premiere)
- Running time: 107 minutes
- Country: Australia
- Language: English
- Budget: $7.5 million

In Her Skin (also known as I Am You from the working title How to Change in 9 Weeks) is a 2009 Australian drama movie written and directed by Simone North. The film is based on the true story of the murder of 15-year-old Rachel Barber, Ivan Southall's granddaughter, who went missing on March 1, 1999. It was later discovered that Barber was murdered by a former neighbour and family babysitter, Caroline Reed Robertson.

The film's story is told from alternating points of view; the victim, the victim's parents, and the murderer. Flashbacks reveal details about all of the characters, including the motive of the murderer. In Her Skin is inspired by the book Perfect Victim by Elizabeth Southall (Rachel's mother) and Megan Norris (an Investigative reporter).

== Synopsis ==
Fifteen-year old Rachel Barber misses her train to meet with her father. Her parents grow concerned and report the incident to the police the next day. Since Rachel had gone missing with her backpack, with several of her most favorite possessions, the police treat the case as a teenage runaway incident.

Caroline Reid Robertson, a former neighbor and babysitter to the Barber family suffers from low self-esteem, depression, and an inferiority complex due to being bullied at school. Her parents are divorced and she has a complicated relationship with them. She idolizes the Barber family especially their daughter Rachel and tries to emulate her. This obsession continues even after Caroline starts her adult life away from the Barber family. After years spent in obsessing over Rachel, Caroline decides to 'become' Rachel and replace her. She asks Rachel to be a part of a confidential study through which Rachel can earn a considerable amount of money. Rachel confides about the study to her boyfriend, Manni, who is skeptical about it, but she does not tell him who recruited her for the study.

Rachel goes to Caroline's apartment where they talk to each other and drink. Caroline manages to incapacitate Rachel and strangles her to death.

Meanwhile, Manni tells Rachel's parents about the study Rachel wanted to participate in. An analyst with the police's Missing Persons department, Max DePyle, takes an interest in the case. DePyle calls in a favor with a friend at Australia's Most Wanted so that the case can get special attention from the media.

Caroline dumps Rachel's body at her father's farm. She thinks about how she can use Rachel's identity to start afresh. Feigning concern over Rachel's disappearance, Caroline calls the Barber home. But she is appalled to find that someone described Rachel being seen with a woman matching Caroline's description.

Caroline's odd behavior does not go unnoticed and soon her mother shares her concerns with Caroline's father. The police also become interested in Caroline and Detective Neil Paterson and DePyle bring her in for questioning. Caroline collapses and has to be hospitalized. Her father coaxes her to admit her possible role in Rachel's disappearance. Caroline ends up confessing to the murder and Detective Paterson arrests her.

Patterson and DePyle come to the Barber household to inform them of Rachel's fate and Caroline's involvement in it.

The film closes with Caroline in prison awaiting trial while Rachel's funeral is attended by her family and friends.

== Cast ==
- Guy Pearce as Mike Barber, Rachel's father
- Miranda Otto as Elizabeth Barber, Rachel's mother
- Kate Bell as Rachel Barber, 15-year-old Australian dance student who went missing in Melbourne in 1999
- Khan Chittenden as Manni Carella, Rachel's boyfriend
- Sam Neill as David Reid, Caroline's father
- Rebecca Gibney as Gail, Caroline's mother
- Ruth Bradley as Caroline Reed Robertson, Rachel's former neighbour and sitter
- Jack Finsterer as Neil Patterson, Police Detective
- Eugene Gilfedder as Max DePyle, Police Detective
- Robert Braiden as a Detective
- Jeremy Sims as McLean, Policeman
- Damien Garvey as Policeman
- Claude Minisini as Stephen Waddell, Missing Persons Boss
- Justine Clarke as Irene, Caroline's Boss
- Graeme Blundell as Ivan, Elizabeth's father
- Diane Craig as Joy, Elizabeth's mother
- Steven Vidler as Drew, Elizabeth's brother
- Kelly Abbey as Zoe, Rachel's Dance Teacher (also choreographer for the film)
- Veronica Neave as Yvonne, Elizabeth's friend
- Paul Bishop as Doctor
- Paul Denny as Ambulance man
- Tori Forrest as Heather Barber (9 years old)
- Amanda Dettrick as Diane, Rachel's family friend
- Dan Purdey as Missing Persons Cop
- John Wonnacott as Missing Persons Cop

== Production ==
In Her Skin was inspired by the 2004 book Perfect Victim by Elizabeth Southall, the pen name of Elizabeth Barber, Rachel Barber's mother, and Megan Norris, an investigative reporter who as a court reporter followed the case of the murder of Rachel Barber. As alluded to in the film, Robertson went on to trial: after pleading guilty, she was sentenced and jailed in 2000 before being paroled in January 2015.

The film was shot in 2008 in Brisbane and Melbourne under the title How to Change in 9 Weeks. It was the directorial debut for Simone North. She had worked extensively in the film and television industry as a Creative Producer and writer. Director Sidney Lumet mentored In Her Skin director Simone North prior to production.

The Film Finance Corporation invested $3.02 million in the film. Screen Queensland cashflowed the distribution guarantee from Reliant Pictures, the distributor, which was to be repaid 12 months after delivery. Liberty Films bankrolled the Icon distribution guarantee, which was to be repaid when the film was delivered. Neither Reliant Pictures nor Icon paid these guarantees.

=== Post-production controversies ===
The film was re-cut by the international distributor, Reliant Pictures International, without informing the filmmakers. The film's producers objected to this, because it broke contractual obligations to the Barbers. Also, as it was based on the true story of Rachel Barber who died in 1999 by the hands of a babysitter, the re-cut was potentially defamatory.

Thom Mount of Reliant Pictures was forced to destroy the cut, as the American and Australian Writers Guild and American and Australian Directors Guild, backed by contractual obligations, found the cut to be illegal. Omnilab, who was working with Reliant Pictures and were involved in the recut and part of the RFFF loan with Reliant, refused to repay Screen Queensland the $2.3 million loan. It has never been paid. Screen Queensland attempted to recover its money through the courts, suing both Omnilab Media and Mapp Group Holdings, who had underwritten Reliant’s distribution guarantee. The PFTC (which became Screen Queensland) eventually settled out of court with Omnilab. Film Finances paid for and aided the re-cut with the American Producer.

Goldcrest Films was given the film by Tony Cavanaugh, the Producer of the Film for international distribution, and screened it at markets in 2011 under the title I Am You. Icon films refused to release the film theatrically in Australia and ended the contract as the film remained as per the script, not the re-cut.

== Release ==
The film screened at the Brisbane International Film Festival in 2012. It was screened on Foxtel in Australia on 2013.

== Music ==
"Caroline", "What You Want" and "Ocean" were written and performed by John Butler Trio, Family Music, Jarrah Records. "Dawning" and "Dying Swan" were performed by Mark Seymour and Cameron McKenzie. Score music was arranged and conducted by Nico Muhly and performed by Amiina (Iceland).

== Awards ==
Ruth Bradley won the Best Actress award at the Milan International Film Festival 2010 for her performance as Caroline Reed Robertson.

== See also ==
- Cinema of Australia
