= Couchman =

Couchman is a surname. Notable people with the surname include:

- Couchman (Kent cricketer), 18th-century English cricketer
- Elizabeth Couchman (1876–1982), Australian political activist
- Henry Couchman, 18th-century English architect and landscape gardener
- Hugh Couchman, Canadian astronomer
- James Couchman (born 1942), British politician
- John Couchman (1913–2004), British rower
- Peter Couchman (born 1941), Australian journalist and writer
- Walter Couchman (1905–1981), British Royal Navy admiral
- Martin Couchman OBE (born 1947), Hotelier of sorts
