= Blue Water High =

Australian television series

- Opening title card (season 1)
- Written by: Shelly Birse; Charlie Richardson; Jennifer Mellet; Kristen Dunphy; Michael Miller; John Armstrong; Marissa Cooke; Noel Price; Chris Phillips; David Ogilvy
- Directed by: Marcus Cole; Ralph Strasser; Ian Watson; Chris Martin-Jones
- Starring: Season 1 Sophie Luck (series 1 & 2); Tahyna Tozzi; Kate Bell (series 1 & 3); Mara Scherzinger; Khan Chittenden; Adam Saunders (Series 1 & 2); Christopher Foy; Season 2 Gabrielle Scollay; Lesley Anne Mitchell; Taryn Marler; James Sorensen; Ryan Corr; Trent Dalzell; Martin Lynes; Liz Burch; Season 3 Cariba Heine; Kain O'Keeffe; Lachlan Buchanan; Eka Darville; Amy Beckwith; Rebecca Breeds; Craig Horner; Don Halbert (series 1–3); Nell Mitchell
- Theme music composer: Liam Finn
- Opening theme: "Aiming for Your Head" by Betchadupa
- Ending theme: "Aiming for Your Head"
- Country of origin: Australia
- Original language: English
- No. of seasons: 3
- No. of episodes: 78 (list of episodes)

Production
- Executive producers: Noel Price; Claire Henderson (series 1 & 2); Matt Bruce (series 1); Tim Brooke-Hunt (series 3)
- Producers: Dennis Kiely; Noel Price
- Cinematography: Russell Bacon; Brendan Lavelle
- Editors: Simon Martin; Patrick Stewart; Michael J. Hagan
- Running time: 25-26 minutes
- Production company: Southern Star Entertainment

Original release
- Network: ABC1; Nickelodeon
- Release: 11 May 2005 – 25 September 2008

Blue Water High is an Australian television drama series, broadcast by the Australian Broadcasting Corporation on ABC1 and on Austar/Foxtel Nickelodeon channel in Australia and on various channels in many other countries. Each season follows the lives of a young group of students at Solar Blue, a high-performance surf academy where several lucky 16-year-olds are selected for a 12-month-long surfing program at Bilgola Beach, Sydney.

There are three seasons in Blue Water High. The first two seasons aired in 2005 and 2006 and the producers did not intend to create a third and final season. However, due to popular demand by fans, they relented and made one more season with only Kate Bell returning in a main role. Season 3 ended with the closure of Solar Blue because of a lack of funding, indicating that the show would most likely not continue.

== Plot summary ==
=== Season 1 ===
The first season consisted of twenty-six episodes. It starred Adam Saunders as Heath, Tahyna Tozzi as Perri, Sophie Luck as Fly, Kate Bell as Bec, Khan Chittenden as Edge, Chris Foy as Matt and Mara Scherzinger as Anna. At the end of the year, two of them (one girl and one boy) get a wild card spot on the pro-circuit tour. The winners for season 1 were Fly and Edge. The first season was released on DVD in 4 volumes. Sophie Luck won the 2005 Australian Film Institute Award for Best Young Actor for her role in the series.

=== Season 2 ===
Filming of a second season began in early January 2006 in Sydney, with a revised cast, which included Sophie Luck (who was back as Fly), Adam Saunders as Heath (who leaves in episode six), Trent Dalzell as Corey, Ryan Corr as Eric, Lesley Anne Mitchell as Brooke, Taryn Marler as Rachel, Gabrielle Scollay as Amy, and James Sorensen as Mike. It premiered on 28 June 2006. Luck, Saunders, Kate Bell, Chris Foy, Tahyna Tozzi, Nadine Garner and Khan Chittenden all reappeared in the second season in various episodes. The winners of season 2 were Brooke and Eric.

The complete second season was released on DVD in Australia on 1 October 2007.

=== Season 3 ===
The third and final season began filming in October 2007. Kate Bell returns as Bec for season 3 and is joined by Craig Horner as Garry. The new Solar Blue pupils are Guy (Kain O'Keeffe), Charley (Lachlan Buchanan), Adam (Eka Darville), Bridget (Cariba Heine), Loren (Amy Beckwith) and Cassie (Rebecca Breeds). Season 3 began screening on Rollercoaster on 3 April 2008.

The winners are Bridget and Adam, but Bridget decides to go to university instead of joining the Pro Circuit, so Loren gets the wild card after Cassie literally 'draws the short straw' (as they both have the same number of points in the final surf-off, so they decide who gets the wild card this way). In the last episode, Simmo makes a surprise return as one of the three judges in what is described as "one of the best finals Solar Blue has seen", saving the day as he pulls "not a rabbit out of a hat, but an elephant", ensuring that the winners of the final surf-off still get a wild card invitation.

== Cast ==
=== Season one ===
Series 1 cast of Blue Water High, from left to right: Back Row: Bec, Heath, Matt, Simmo, Deb, and Anna. Middle Row: Perri Front Row: Edge and Fly

- Kate Bell as Rebecca 'Bec' Sanderson
- Khan Chittenden as Dean 'Edge' Edgely
- Chris Foy – Matthew 'Matt' Leyland
- Sophie Luck as Fiona 'Fly' Watson
- Adam Saunders as Heath Carroll
- Mara Scherzinger – Anna Peterson
- Tahyna Tozzi as Perri Lawe
- Martin Lynes as Craig 'Simmo' Simmonds
- Nadine Garner as Deborah 'Deb' Callum
- Liz Burch as Jilly
- Matt Rudduck as Joe Sanderson
- Clae Whitelaw as Simon Heart
- Don Halbert as Mr. Savin

=== Season two ===
Series 2 cast of Blue Water High, from left to right: Back Row: Amy, Fly, Eric, and Corey Front Row: Rachael, Mike, and Brooke

- Ryan Corr as Eric Tanner
- Gabrielle Scollay as Amy Reed
- James Sorensen as Michael 'Mike' Kruze
- Lesley Anne Mitchell as Brooke Solomon
- Trent Dalzell as Corey Petrie
- Taryn Marler as Rachael Samuels
- Adam Saunders as Heath Carroll
- Sophie Luck as Fiona 'Fly' Watson
- Kate Bell as Rebecca 'Bec' Sanderson
- Martin Lynes as Craig 'Simmo' Simmonds
- Joe Ireland as Dave Jones
- Liz Burch as Jilly
- Natasha Sitkowski as Greta
- Don Halbert as Mr. Savin

=== Season three ===
Series 3 cast of Blue Water High, from left to right: Back Row: Garry, and Bec Middle Row: Bridget, Cassie, and Loren Front Row: Guy, Adam, and Charley

- Kain O'Keeffe as Guy Spender
- Lachlan Buchanan as Charley Prince
- Eka Darville as Adam Bridge
- Cariba Heine as Bridget Sanchez
- Amy Beckwith as Lauren 'Loren' Power
- Rebecca Breeds as Cassandra 'Cassie' Cometti
- Craig Horner as Garry Miller
- Kate Bell as Rebecca 'Bec' Sanderson
- Tom Fisher as James Cassidy
- Erol Cimen as Michael De Santa
- Don Halbert as Mr. Savin

== List of episodes ==
=== Season 1 (2005) ===
No. overall	No. in season	Title	Directed by	Written by	Featured character	Original release date
1	1	"The Contenders"	Ralph Strasser	Shelley Birse	Heath	11 May 2005
6 teenagers have been selected for the 1 year long training at Solar Blue academy, Rebecca "Bec" Sanderson, Dean "Edge" Edgely, Matthew "Matt" Leyland, Fiona "Fly" Watson, Perri Lawe and Heath Carroll. The seventh and last is supposed to go to a male contender, but at the last minute Solar Blue decides to pick their own candidate who happens a German girl named Anna Peterson. Bec is upset because her brother, Joe, was supposed to compete for the last spot.
2	2	"Winners and Losers"	Ralph Strasser	Shelley Birse	Anna and Bec	18 May 2005
Anna feels pressure as Bec continues to be upset at Solar Blue deciding to pick Anna. So much as that Anna decides to have in a surf competition with Joe to decide who get to stay at Solar Blue.
3	3	"Trouble in Paradise"	Ralph Strasser	Charlie Richardson	Matt	25 May 2005
The group has their first day in school where they find themselves in representing the School's surf team. When They found out that their competition happens at same time as a contract party organized by Solar Blue, they have to decide where their priorities lie.
4	4	"Fly Takes a Dive"	Ian Watson	Jennifer Mellet	Fly	1 June 2005
Fly is feeling homesick and inadequate, being the youngest in her family and the contesters.
5	5	"Anna Loses Her Way"	Ralph Strasser	Shelley Birse	Anna	8 June 2005
The teens discover where Simmo keeps the coaching files and that their weakness are written in them. They debate if they should there individual files to make their training easier.
6	6	"Edge Wipes Out"	Tony Tilse	John Armstrong	Edge	15 June 2005
Edge has been losing competitions and gets in a dangerous situation after overestimating his abilities.
7	7	"Friends in Need"	Tony Tilse	Shelley Birse	Heath	22 June 2005
Heath copies Matt's homework project after falling behind in school, causing them to both lose points in school and in the surf competition.
8	8	"Brothers and Sisters"	Ian Watson	John Armstrong	Bec	29 June 2005
Bec is struggling with her relationship with Joe when he starts hanging out a group of people pestering the Solar Blue team.
9	9	"Sharks in the Mind"	Ian Watson	Shelley Birse	Matt	6 July 2005
Matt's father wants Matt to join him in the crayfishing businesses.
10	10	"Timing Is Everything"	Tony Tilse	Noel Price	Perri	13 July 2005
Perri is low on money when she gets offered a modeling contract.
11	11	"Out of Control"	Ralph Strasser	Jennifer Mellet	Matt and Edge	20 July 2005
Matt and Edge's rivalry for the top of Academy scoreboard escalates when they accidentally put Bec's little brother, Ben, in danger.
12	12	"Dreams and Dramas"	Tony Tilse	Shelley Birse	Fly	27 July 2005
Fly is nervous as she realizes she has feelings for Heath.
13	13	"Life on the Line"	Ian Watson	Shelley Birse	Perri	3 August 2005
Perri bonds with a surfer she saves from drowning.
14	14	"Bad Boy Heath"	Ralph Strasser	Noel Price	Heath	10 August 2005
Heath falls for a girl, making Fly jealous.
15	15	"Joker's Wild"	Marcus Cole	Michael Miller	Fly	17 August 2005
16	16	"It's Hard to Be Normal"	Ian Watson	Shelley Birse	Anna	24 August 2005
Anna decides to focus on having fun instead of constantly training.
17	17	"Perri Lies Low"	Ian Watson	Michael Miller	Perri	31 August 2005
Perri faints due to her diabetes, which she has been hiding to not get disqualified
18	18	"Winning Isn't Everything"	Ralph Strasser	Shelley Birse	Edge	7 September 2005
Edge races in an endurance test alone.
19	19	"Right Dance, Wrong Partner"	Marcus Cole	Kristen Dunphy	Matt	14 September 2005
20	20	"Big Wave Fears"	Ralph Strasser	Kristen Dunphy	Bec	21 September 2005
21	21	"The Kiss"	Marcus Cole	Shelley Birse	Perri	28 September 2005
22	22	"Behind the Scenes"	Marcus Cole	Nole Price	Heath	5 October 2005
23	23	"Tough Choices"	Marcus Cole	Kristen Dunphy	Anna	12 October 2005
24	24	"The Band Plays On"	Ian Watson	Kristen Dunphy	Bec	19 October 2005
25	25	"Suspicious Minds"	Ralph Strasser	Merilyn Slade	Heath	26 October 2005
26	26	"And the Winner Is..."	Ralph Strasser	Noel Price	TBA	2 November 2005

=== Season 2 (2006) ===
Episodes of season 2 were not named but were numbered from 1 to 26.

No. overall	No. in season	Title	Directed by	Written by	Featured character	Original release date
27	1	"Episode 1"	Ralph Strasser	Shelley Birse, Noel Price	Fly	28 June 2006
28	2	"Episode 2"	Ralph Strasser	John Armstrong	Amy	5 July 2006
29	3	"Episode 3"	Chris Martin-Jones	Noel Price	Amy	12 July 2006
30	4	"Episode 4"	Chris Martin-Jones	Noel Price	Corey	19 July 2006
31	5	"Episode 5"	Marcus Cole	John Armstrong	Eric	26 July 2006
32	6	"Episode 6"	Marcus Cole	Shelley Birse	Fly	2 August 2006
33	7	"Episode 7"	Marcus Cole	Shelley Birse	Rachael	9 August 2006
34	8	"Episode 8"	Marcus Cole	John Armstrong	Eric	16 August 2006
35	9	"Episode 9"	Ralph Strasser	Noel Price	Rachael and Corey	23 August 2006
36	10	"Episode 10"	Ralph Strasser	John Armstrong	Brooke	30 August 2006
37	11	"Episode 11"	Chris Martin-Jones	Chris Hawkshaw	Amy and Eric	6 September 2006
38	12	"Episode 12"	Chris Martin-Jones	Ellie Beaumont	Brooke	13 September 2006
39	13	"Episode 13"	Chris Martin-Jones	Kristen Dunphy	Eric	20 September 2006
40	14	"Episode 14"	Marcus Cole	Ellie Beaumont	Amy	27 September 2006
41	15	"Episode 15"	Ralph Strasser	John Armstrong	Amy	4 October 2006
42	16	"Episode 16"	Marcus Cole	John Armstromg	Amy	11 October 2006
43	17	"Episode 17"	Chris Martin-Jones	Chris Hawkshaw	Edge	18 October 2006
44	18	"Episode 18"	Ralph Strasser	Sarah Smith	Brooke	25 October 2006
45	19	"Episode 19"	Ralph Strasser	Ellie Beaumont	Mike	1 November 2006
46	20	"Episode 20"	Marcus Cole	John Armstrong	Rachel	8 November 2006
47	21	"Episode 21"	Marcus Cole	Shelley Birse	Eric	15 November 2006
48	22	"Episode 22"	Ralph Strasser	Sarah Smith	Brooke	22 November 2006
49	23	"Episode 23"	Chris Martin-Jones	Kristen Dunphy, Kym Goldsworthy	Corey	29 November 2006
50	24	"Episode 24"	Chris Martin-Jones	John Armstromg	Amy	6 December 2006
51	25	"Episode 25"	Marcus Cole	Shelley Birse	Fly	13 December 2006
52	26	"Episode 26"	Marcus Cole	John Armstrong	TBA	13 December 2006

=== Season 3 (2008) ===
Episodes of season 3 were also not named, but were numbered from 1 to 26.

No. overall	No. in season	Title	Directed by	Written by	Featured character	Original release date
53	1	"Episode 1"	Ralph Strasser	Noel Price	Cassie	3 April 2008
This episode focused on the beginning of the year in Solar Blue for the new 6 intakes for the year, introducing them all: Bridget and Charley (known as "The King") both very seriously intense and engaged to learn and train; Guy, a laid back "surfing machine" that is clumsy the second he steps out of the water; Loren, an extremely friendly yet overly anxious girl with low self-confidence; and Cassie and Adam, two "wildcards" that Simmo had found on offshore beaches that he thought has potential. Despite Cassie's excitement to being in Solar Blue for the year, the day didn't start off well. Solar Blue gets bought by a large corporation, which is mostly represented by "Mr. Lee". Mr. Simmonnds, the renowned coach, decides to leave Solar Blue, and Bec gets offered a job as an administrator for running Solar Blue due to her experience. Cassie and Adam arrive early at Solar Blue to find it wrapped up at the same time; hence finding themselves at the police station for the night after failing to contact those in charge at Solar Blue. The following day, the other 4 arrive and the two do so too, and after careful thinking, Bec decides to take the job in running the academy.
54	2	"Episode 2"	Ralph Strasser	Noel Price	Charley	10 April 2008
In this episode, Charley openly talks about his generally cold manner towards the others due to his determined strive to do well. In choosing an appropriate surfing coach for the students, Bec decides to leave it to be chosen via voting by the students themselves at Solar Blue, causing heat and rivalry. They meet the two shortlisted candidates - Dave Stretin and Garry Miller; both ex-pros of the Pro Circuit of 10 and 4 years respectively. After the interviews, they find that Dave has a more fun-filled approach, talking about fun stories of his time in the Circuit whereas Garry is brief and almost curt about his past, encouraging good discipline and a boundary-set relationship between the coach and the students. Adam, Cassie, Loren, Guy, and Bridget all vote for Dave, but Charley researches and despite backlash, decides on Garry. In the end, after explaining his reasoning behind his choice, they all go for Garry, and his attitude opens up, and he attempts to be more friendlier to the other intakes.
55	3	"Episode 3"	Marcus Cole	Noel Price	Loren	17 April 2008
Despite the kickoff and thrill to be at Solar Blue, Loren begins to look around her at her competitors and is completely overwhelmed. Comparing herself with Bridget and Cassie, she finds herself out of place and realizes that she should drop out. After talking with Bec about it, she decides to wait until the competition that was coming the next day, but in her final heat, she rode a beautiful wave, wanting to finish off her time here and making the most of it. An inexperienced competitor, however, drops in on her wave, making her unable to perform at her level best, intent that she should leave Solar Blue. Just as she was about to give up, Bec gives her the score sheet of the judges' marks in the previous heats and she finds that she got a 9 before the final heat, higher than Bridget and Cassie both. This boosts her confidence and she decides to stay.
56	4	"Episode 4"	Marcus Cole	Noel Price	Adam	24 April 2008
In order to make sure the 6 surfers have what it takes, Bec and Garry decide to push the surfers to the hardest, trying to find whether they wanted to be here. Adam gets frustrated after being 2 weeks in at Garry's attitude as it got built up. On a hot day of 35 degrees Celsius, Garry decides to put them all on tracks carrying heavy dead weight for 4 hours, splitting them up in teams of 2 but offering training points in return. Adam lashes out and refuses to partake in the activity, but when Garry puts Cassie's training points on the line, too, he decides to do it anyway. That following evening, he complains loudly to Bec and Garry, and they admit to pushing them to their hardest right before the term started as a test, so Adam understands and decides to stay at Solar Blue.
57	5	"Episode 5"	Chris Martin-Jones	Noel Price	Bridget	1 May 2008
Similar to Charley's episode (episode 2), this episode is where Bridget talks about her overcompetitiveness - not only in the water but from academic achievements to something as simple as dishwashing.
58	6	"Episode 6"	Marcus Cole	Noel Price	TBA	8 May 2008
59	7	"Episode 7"	Marcus Cole	Kristen Dunphy	TBA	15 May 2008
60	8	"Episode 8"	Chris Martin-Jones	Noel Price	TBA	22 May 2008
61	9	"Episode 9"	Chris Martin-Jones	Noel Price	TBA	29 May 2008
62	10	"Episode 10"	Chris Martin-Jones	Chris Phillips	TBA	5 June 2008
63	11	"Episode 11"	Ralph Strasser	Noel Price	TBA	12 June 2008
64	12	"Episode 12"	Ralph Strasser	Noel Price	TBA	19 June 2008
65	13	"Episode 13"	Ralph Strasser	Noel Price	TBA	26 June 2008
66	14	"Episode 14"	Chris Martin-Jones	Noel Price, David Ogilvy	TBA	3 July 2008
67	15	"Episode 15"	Marcus Cole	Noel Price	TBA	10 July 2008
68	16	"Episode 16"	Chris Martin-Jones	Noel Price	TBA	17 July 2008
69	17	"Episode 17"	Chris Martin-Jones	Noel Price	TBA	24 July 2008
70	18	"Episode 18"	Marcus Cole	John Armstrong	TBA	31 July 2008
71	19	"Episode 19"	Marcus Cole	Noel Price	TBA	7 August 2008
72	20	"Episode 20"	Marcus Cole	Noel Price	TBA	14 August 2008
73	21	"Episode 21"	Ralph Strasser	Noel Price	TBA	21 August 2008
74	22	"Episode 22"	Ralph Strasser	John Armstrong	TBA	28 August 2008
75	23	"Episode 23"	Chris Martin-Jones	Noel Price	TBA	4 September 2008
76	24	"Episode 24"	Ralph Strasser	John Armstrong	TBA	11 September 2008
77	25	"Episode 25"	Marcus Cole	Noel Price	TBA	18 September 2008
78	26	"Episode 26"	Marcus Cole	Noel Price	TBA	25 September 2008

== International broadcasts ==
Country	Channel	Year
Italy	Nickelodeon (Italy), Italia 1 and Boing (Italy)	2006–2010
Mexico	Boomerang	2005–2008
New Zealand	TV2	2007–2012
Australia	ABC TV	2005–2010
Australia	Australia Network	2014–
Sweden	SVT1, Barnkanalen	2007–2011
Poland	ZigZap, TVP1 and Filmy+	2007–2010
Germany	KI.KA	2007–2010
Ireland	RTÉ Two	2007–2010
Spain	La 2, Neox and Clan TVE	2007–2010
France	Filles TV/June	2007–2010
France	France Ô	2012–2015
Norway	TV2 Zebra	2007–2011
Portugal	SIC and SIC K	2009–2019
Netherlands	RTL 8	2009–2013
Brazil	Boomerang Brazil and TV Brasil	2006–2014
British Virgin Islands	Falkland Islands Television Service	2009–2013
South Africa	Go	2009
South Africa	Magic World 112	2010–2013
Great Britain	Boomerang and Pop Girl	2006–2012
Belgium	Ketnet	2010s
Russia	Teen TV	2011
Romania	Megamax	2010s

=== Africa ===
In South Africa, Blue Water High was aired twice a week on Go on the local satellite system, DSTV. After DSTV added more MNET channels, Blue Water High started airing every weekday at 19:30 on Magic World 112 from 1 July 2010.

=== Europe ===
In Germany, the series is called Blue Water High, die Surf-Akademie (which means "Blue Water High, the Surf Academy") and is broadcast on KI.KA (a children's channel). In Ireland Blue Water High was broadcast on RTÉ Two as part of The Den and, in Spain, the show was broadcast on La 2, Clan TVE and Neox. In France, it was broadcast on Filles TV as Blue Water High: Surf Academy in 2007 and France Ô has started re-airing the series on 12 November 2012. In Norway the show aired on TV 2 Zebra. In Portugal, SIC also bought the first season, and it aired in the country from Monday to Friday at 5pm in Summer 2009; the show was named Mar Azul ("Blue Sea"). It also started again on SIC K in December of that year, where it has, since, been airing, on and off. The series also began airing on RTL 8 in the Netherlands from 2009 onwards. In the United Kingdom, the show was originally broadcast on Toonami. Once the channel closed, it was moved over to Boomerang. It later aired on Pop Girl.

=== North America ===
Blue Water High was broadcast online in USA through the former The WB Television Network, which was resurrected by the Warner Bros. television arm as a website in 2008. Currently, the series is now streaming on Tubi.

=== Oceania ===
In Australia, the country of its origin, Blue Water High aired once every week on ABC3. In New Zealand, Blue Water High currently airs every Saturday afternoon on TV2

=== South America ===
In the Spanish-speaking countries of Latin America, the show is titled Blue Water High, Escuela del Surf, which translates as "Blue Water High, Surf Academy", and is broadcast on Boomerang Latin America. In Brazil, it is broadcast by Boomerang Brazil and TV Brasil under the title Galera do Surfe (The Surf Crowd). In Falkland Islands, Blue Water High was aired on Falkland Islands Television Service Tuesdays to Friday at 15:00 and Saturday at 11:30.

== Home media ==
=== DVD releases ===
Blue Water High has been released in its entirety on DVD. Originally distributed by Roadshow Entertainment, the first series was made available over four individual volumes in 2005 (omitting "Life on the Line" due to licensing rights), before a complete first series set was released in 2007, followed by a complete second series set in the same year. The third and final series remained unreleased, until 2020, when Via Vision and Madman Entertainment acquired the rights for home distribution of the series, releasing the complete series on DVD.

Title	Release date		Ep #	Discs #
Title	Region 2 (Germany)	Region 4	Ep #	Discs #
Volume 1 (Series 1, episodes 1–6)	—N/a	23 September 2005	6	1
Volume 2 (Series 1, episodes 7–12)	—N/a	23 September 2005	6	1
Volume 3 (Series 1, episodes 14–19)	—N/a	11 November 2005	6	1
Volume 4 (Series 1, episodes 20–26)	—N/a	11 November 2005	7	1
The Complete First Series (as "Staffel 1" in Germany)	9 September 2016	7 February 2007	26	4
The Complete Second Series	—N/a	7 February 2007	26	4
Seasons 1–3	—N/a	7 October 2020	78	12

=== Online streaming ===
All Seasons of Blue Water High are currently streaming for release on 7plus.

Title	Format	Ep #	Release date	Distributors
Blue Water High: Season 01	Streaming	26	2019	7plus
Blue Water High: Season 02	Streaming	26	2019	7plus
Blue Water High: Season 03	Streaming	26	2019	7plus
