= Kate Bell (Australian actress) =

Australian actress (born 1983)

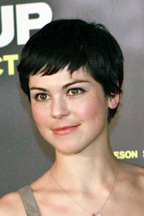
- Bell in 2010
- Occupation: actress

Kate Bell is an Australian actress.

== Career ==
Bell played the role of Joey Collins in Home and Away. In 2010, she had a guest role in Neighbours.

== Filmography ==
- In Her Skin
- Blue Water High (53 Episodes)
- Neighbours (11 Episodes)
- Home and Away (10 Episodes)
- The Pacific
