= Eat Carpet =

Australian television series

Eat Carpet was an Australian television series aired on SBS from 1989 to 2005. It premiered alongside MC Tee Vee and The Noise. Each hour-long episode consisted of up to a dozen short films shot by amateur directors or film students from all over the world.

An estimated 3,000 films ranging from 2 to 24 minutes in duration were broadcast over the course of the series, covering all styles and genres, including documentaries, music videos, stage performances, dramas, comedies, interviews and even mildly pornographic films.

The show was hosted by Annette Shun Wah, who was also one of the commissioning editors along with Eat Carpet's original designer, producer and programmer Pauline Webber. Later, producers included Joy Toma and Terry Toaldo. The original opening titles were created by Bruce Currie and featured an animated version of the character Flacco, created by Paul Livingston.

Eat Carpet ended in 2005 after 16 years. It was replaced by the similarly themed Shorts on Screen, until this, too, was cancelled in 2014.
