= Mara Scherzinger =

German actress (born 1989)

- Born: September 23, 1989 (age 35); Titisee-Neustadt, Germany

Mara Scherzinger (born September 23, 1989) is a German actress. She performed in commercials, TV films, TV series, and cinema movies.

== Childhood ==
Mara Scherzinger grew up in Saig, Lenzkirch in the Black Forest. Her father, Paulus Straub, was an electronics engineer working in solar energy business. Her mother is Claudia Scherzinger, working as Business and Personality-Development coach; Mara has a brother named Jannis, who now works as filmmaker and musician. He performs in a Duo with Lilian Lito.

About 2000, the family moved to Cologne and in 2004 to Sydney, Australia. There Mara became a Lifeguard at Surf Life Saving Australia in Long Beach. With the club she competed in related sports competitions specialising in IRB - (inflatable rescue boat) races.

== Career ==
In 2002, she got a small role in a commercial for Masterfoods. Her success came with the film Love and Desire, in which she plays Torchy, a troubled and wild juvenile. She played alongside award-winning actress Natalia Wörner and Katja Flint. From then on parts in short films, movies and series followed. Her role as Anna Peterson on the Australian/German produced TV-Series Blue Water High gained her credits as it aired not only in Australia and Germany but also in more than 10 other countries. Another highlight was getting to kiss Bill Murray in the movie The Monuments Men (2014).

Mara has been singing and dancing since a young age and continues to take classes for example at the Sydney Dance Company and other acclaimed institutions.

The girlgroup "Pretty Girls" was founded by Mara Scherzinger, Mareike Xander, Joana Xander and Johanna Sandvoss in 2001. They had international success until 2005.

From 2002 until 2005, Mara took part in the High Performance Leadership Training with shows on Broadway in NYC and at Starnberger Lake in Bavaria.

In 2008, she completed her HSC Certificate, Performing Arts (Drama, Dance and Arts) in New South Wales, Australia.

Parallel to acting, school and international travels and workshops Mara Scherzinger has also worked as a model in print and catwalk. On print she appeared in various magazines. For example, Dolly and Girlfriend Australia, YAM! Germany etc. The shows range from fashion shows in Manhattan, NYC to shows in Germany for various labels like La Perla, Britta Uschkamp and Valisere. At the international trade fair photokina 2010 she worked with the American fashion and lifestyle photographer Steve Thornton, as well as with the photographers of fine arts Manuel Cortez and Florian Anders in Berlin.

== Filmography ==
- Love and Desire (2003)
- German TV series SK Kölsch (2004)
- Australian TV series Blue Water High (2005)
- Beautiful Bitch (2006)
- German Arte TV Pilot Monologe (2010)
- The Monuments Men (2014)
- Übers Wasser (over the water) (2014)

List of film works
Title	Year	Role	Notes
Monologe	2011	Ranja	Monologue: "Vollmilch-Nuss"; TV format pilot, directed by Florian Anders
Life Changes	2010	Arielle	Short film
The Witch and the Holy	2008	Sybilla	Short film, by Lena Film Los Angeles
Beautiful Bitch	2007	Lea	feature film directed by Martin Theo Krieger best foreign film in Santa Barbara 2008, German cinema Berlinale 2008
Blue Water High	2005	Anna Petersen	Australian TV Series; 2005, 2006 AFI nomination for "Best Children's Television Drama" and "Young Actor Award" 2005. 2007 Logie nomination "Most outstanding Children's Drama" also starring Sophie Luck
SK Kölsch	2004	Maike	TV crime drama, episode "die Liebesfalle"
Love and Desire	2003	Torchy	TV film, 90 minutes, ZDF starring Natalia Wörner, Katja Flint
R.A.U.S.C.H.	2003	Kathi	format: TV Series Pilot, directed by Joscha Douma, Filmakademie Baden-Württemberg (Ludwigsburg)
