= Dangerous (Australian TV series) =

- Genre: Drama
- Created by: John Edwards
- Written by: Fiona Seres; David Caesar; David Michod; Brendan Cowell
- Directed by: David Caesar; Shawn Seet
- Starring: Khan Chittenden; Brooke Satchwell; Joel Edgerton
- Country of origin: Australia
- No. of seasons: 1
- No. of episodes: 8

Production
- Executive producers: Kim Vecera; Hugh Marks
- Producer: John Edwards
- Running time: 60 minutes (with ads)
- Production company: Southern Star Group

Original release
- Network: FOX8
- Release: 16 January – 6 March 2007

Dangerous is an Australian television drama series that first screened on 16 January 2007 on FOX8 and was shown in Ireland on RTÉ One. In mid-2008, it began running on The WB's online network in the US.

It features a "Romeo and Juliet" story of forbidden love, set against the culturally diverse backgrounds of Sydney's western suburbs street crime and the affluence of Sydney's eastern suburbs. It explores youth culture, including taboo subjects like party drug use and the underground world of drag racing and ramraiding. Dangerous is produced by John Edwards and Imogen Banks. Writers include Fiona Seres and Brendan Cowell, acclaimed for their work on Love My Way. It is directed by David Caesar and Shawn Seet. The series' theme song is "Set The Record Straight", performed by New Zealand hip hop group Fast Crew, although the lyrics "Auckland City, let's go" has been changed to "Sydney City, let's go" for use on the show.

== Cast ==
- Khan Chittenden as Dean
- Brooke Satchwell as Donna McCarthy
- Joel Edgerton as Detective Mark Field
- Robert Mammone as Craig Lukovic
- Paul Pantano as Joe
- Nicole da Silva as Erica 'EC' Eulestra
- Vico Thai as Phu 'Riz' Nguyen
- Jack Finsterer as Nathan Walsh
- Steve Rodgers as Brendan
- Katie Wall as Esther
- Jackson Edwards as Kale
- Gabrielle Scollay as Catriona Lukovic
- Kieran Darcy-Smith as Garry
- Trent Dalzell as Jock
- Jess Levett as Tiane
- David Dowell as Daryl
- Waddah Sari as Vinnie
- Justin Rosniak as Kevin
- Jacqueline Brennan as Dean's mother

== Episodes ==
No. in season	Title	Directed by	Written by	Original release date
1	"Episode 1"	David Caesar	Fiona Seres	16 January 2007
2	"Episode 2"	David Caesar	David Caesar	23 January 2007
3	"Episode 3"	Shawn Seet	Fiona Seres	30 January 2007
4	"Episode 4"	Shawn Seet	David Caesar	6 February 2007
5	"Episode 5"	Shawn Seet	David Michôd	13 February 2007
6	"Episode 6"	Shawn Seet	Fiona Seres	20 February 2007
7	"Episode 7"	David Caesar	Fiona Seres & David Caesar	27 February 2007
8	"Episode 8"	David Caesar	Fiona Seres	6 March 2007

== Cars ==
Model	Driver	Colour	Use
1998 Nissan Skyline R34 25GT(2.5 litre non-turbo)	EC but shared with Dean and Riz	Yellow	Getaway car
Subaru WRX	EC	dark green	Diversion Car (Used to draw cops away from Ram-Raids)
Subaru WRX sti version 5	Nathan (later stolen by EC)	White	Getaway
Chevrolet Chevelle	Unknown	Red	Ramraiding Vehicle
DMC Tow truck	EC	White	Ramraiding Vehicle
Holden Commodore SS	Police	White (With Police Lingo)	Police Car
Holden Rodeo	Police	White (with Police Lingo)	Police Car

== See also ==
- List of Australian television series
