= Robert Braiden =

Australian film director, writer and YouTuber

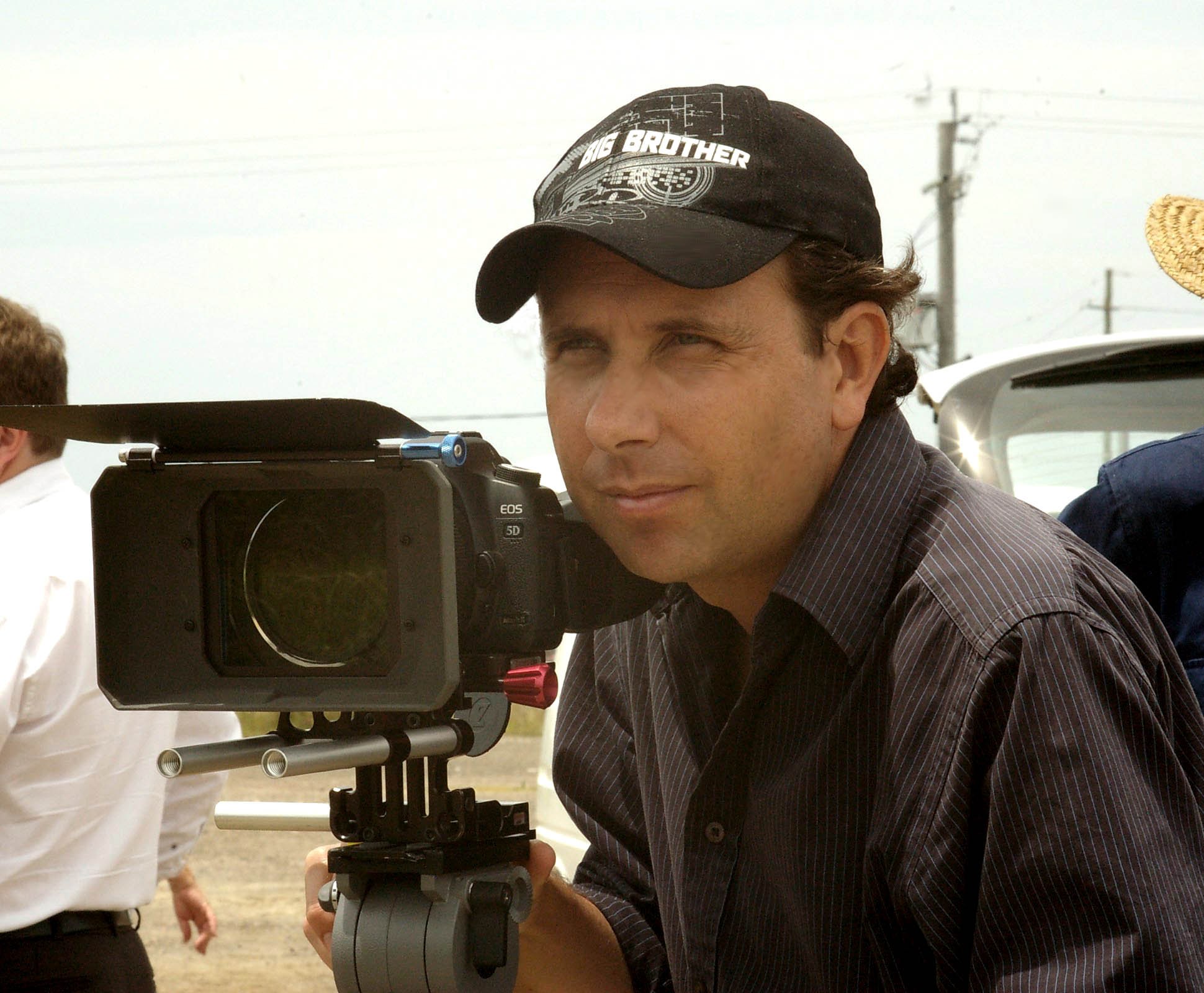
Robert Braiden

Robert Braiden is an Australian film director, writer and YouTuber.

== Film & Television Career ==
Robert studied a Bachelor of Visual Arts in Film and Television Production from Griffith University.

Robert has worked in commercial television as a writer for shows The Great South East and as a story assistant for Big Brother. Braiden wrote and directed the short films Nine Miles Beautiful, Falling, True Love, Ink and The Housewife, and the science fiction feature film 1.

True Love won several industry awards including the Kinetone Award for Best Film at the Queensland New Filmmakers Awards. Braiden was nominated for Best Director and Best Emerging Talent. The film has won the Best Film Award at the NYC Picture Start Film Festival in New York City.

== YouTube Career ==
In 2019, Robert began producing videos on YouTube under the handle "WalkaboutWithRob". Each video consists of him traveling and exploring the history of various suburbs and regions within south East Queensland.
