= Chris Winter (television presenter) =

Australian television presenter (born 1989)

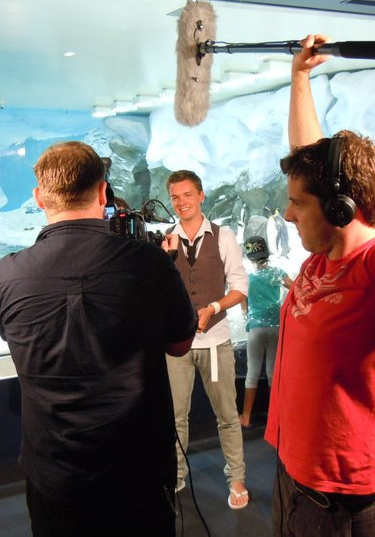
- Winter filming for an episode of Hit List TV at Sea World on the Gold Coast
- Born: Christos Winter; 2 November 1989 (age 36); Mount Gambier, South Australia
- Occupations: Television presenter, YouTuber
- Years active: 2008–present
- Website: chriswinter.com.au

Chris Winter (born 2 November 1989) is an Australian television presenter, YouTube personality and entrepreneur.

== Career ==
=== 2008–2014: Television ===
Winter started his television career at the age of 20, working as an intern news reporter at Channel Nine News. Under the guidance of more experienced journalists, including anchorwoman Eva Milic, Winter continued to learn the trade before successfully auditioning to be a guest host for the Australian wide music television series Hit List TV, which is broadcast on Network Ten and, in country areas, Southern Cross Ten.

=== 2014–present: Move to YouTube ===
Winter started his YouTube channel in 2014, primarily teaching his photography and cinematography knowledge that he learnt during his television career. As of December 2020, Winter has over 500,000 subscribers on YouTube and has had over 55 million views.

Media offices
| Preceded by Tim Dormer | Hit List TV host 2011 | Succeeded by latest |
