= Hugh Couchman =

Canadian astronomer

Hugh Couchman is a Canadian astronomer and professor at McMaster University. He is a computational astrophysicist who studies the growth of structure in the universe via gravitational N-body simulations.

== Early life and education ==
Couchman received both his undergraduate and graduate degrees from Cambridge University. In his final year as an undergraduate, he took a course in astronomy taught by Martin Reese, which sparked his interest in cosmology. In 1986, he completed his Ph.D. from the Institute of Astronomy at Cambridge.

== Career ==
After finishing his PhD, Couchman moved to Canada to begin a postdoctoral fellowship at the Canadian Institute for Theoretical Astrophysics. He spent some time as an assistant professor in the department of Astronomy at the University of Toronto, before beginning a position at the department of physics and astronomy at the University of Western Ontario in 1991.

In 1999, he moved to the department of physics and astronomy at McMaster University. There he helped found SHARCNET, a consortium of universities in South Western Ontario that have joined high performance computers together by optical fiber. He is also a member of the Virgo Consortium for Cosmological Supercomputer Simulations, an international collaboration which performs state-of-the-art cosmological simulations of the large scale structure of the Universe.

== Awards and recognition ==
- Fellow of the CIFAR Program in Gravitation and Cosmology

== Selected publications ==
- MacFarland, Tom; Couchman, H.M.P.; Pearce, F.R.; Pichlmeier, Jakob (1998). "A new parallel code for very large-scale cosmological simulations". New Astronomy. 3 (8): 687–705. arXiv:astro-ph/9805096. Bibcode:1998NewA....3..687M. doi:10.1016/S1384-1076(98)00033-5. ISSN 1384-1076. S2CID 118250431.
- Couchman, H. M. P.; Peebles, P. J. E. (1998-04-20). "A Numerical Renormalization Solution for Self‐similar Cosmic Structure Formation". The Astrophysical Journal. 497 (2): 499–511. arXiv:astro-ph/9708230. Bibcode:1998ApJ...497..499C. doi:10.1086/305499. ISSN 0004-637X. S2CID 2562194.
- Couchman, H. M. P.; Thomas, P. A.; Pearce, F. R. (1995). "Hydra: an Adaptive-Mesh Implementation of P 3M-SPH". The Astrophysical Journal. 452: 797. arXiv:astro-ph/9409058. Bibcode:1995ApJ...452..797C. doi:10.1086/176348. ISSN 0004-637X. S2CID 119419684.
