= Downunder Hostel fire =

1989 arson attack in Sydney, Australia

Coordinates: 33°52′25.3″S 151°13′24.2″E

Downunder Hostel Fire
- Date: 17 September 1989
- Time: Just before 5:00 am
- Location: Kings Cross, Sydney, Australia
- Type: Fire
- Cause: Arson
- Deaths: 6

The Downunder Hotel Fire was a lethal fire on 17 September 1989, set at 4:47 am in a backpackers hostel on Darlinghurst Road, Kings Cross, Sydney, Australia.

== Building ==
The Downunder hotel was originally the Kingsdore hotel, a brothel owned and operated by notorious Sydney criminal Abe Saffron.

Early in 1989, the Kingsdore would change its lease to a company called Baroku Pty Ltd, which formally renamed the establishment as the Downunder Hotel. Abe Saffron maintained ownership.

== Fire ==
Gregory Allan Brown, a serial arsonist born in Adelaide, approached the Downunder around 4.45 am in the early morning of 17 September 1989. Not knowing the hotel's entry code he waited for a backpacking resident to approach. A resident, believed to be Jenny, came to the entrance;

She politely asked, ‘Do you live here?’, and he [Brown] confidently replied, ‘Yes.’ To look like a fellow traveller, the wholly unremarkable Brown carried a small black backpack.

After Jenny went to her room he walked to a couch in the foyer. He knew the building's layout as he had set a fire there previously. Brown, with a sophisticated knowledge of fire progression, set a fire on the foyer couch, knowing the adjacent stairs would act as a chimney and block the only internal escape route for the residents.

The fire, aided by all the fire doors being permanently hooked open, gained access to the rear external wall and penetrated between the wall studs. The fire then entered room 15 and killed four backpackers; Jacinda Hill; Allan Nielsen; David Hillman and Darren Andrews. Two residents, Lennart Storm and Johann Gensluckner perished in the adjacent room 14.

== Gregory Allan Brown ==
Although it was clear the fire had started on the foyer’s lounge, there was no evidence remaining at the fire’s origin to positively establish the exact cause.

On 11 August 1990, Sydney arson detectives were notified that Brown had confessed to lighting a lot of fires in Sydney's CBD. Brown, accompanied by arson detectives was driven around the CBD. He indicated fires he had lit, including the Downunder. Brown clinched his guilt by giving details only the arsonist could have known.

Gregory Allan Brown, clinically diagnosed with psychopathy and Anti Social Personality Disorder had no abnormality of mind, rather an abnormality of behaviour. He tortured and killed animals, tried to kill his stepfather and leeched social services all his life. He lit over 500 building fires in Sydney, Melbourne and Adelaide.

He is rated the 4th most dangerous serial arsonist in world history (out of 1,500) and more dangerous than notorious Australian serial killer Ivan Milat.

He spent 19 years in prison, gaining release in 2009.

== Sex offense ==
In 2022 Gregory Allan Brown appeared in the Supreme Court of Tasmania, accused of asking a 16-year-old girl to send him photos of her vagina, via Messenger. She refused. Brown received a 12 months suspended sentence.

A trio of experts questioned Brown's defense, arguing he fabricated a neglected childhood and other hardships which led to his lighting the Downunder Hostel in anger. The experts argued he used this 'sob' story to gain leniency in his 2022 sex offense case.

Brown was charged with perverting justice. On 27 May 2024 Brown entered no plea to the charge. On 17 September 2024, 35 years to the day of the Downunder arson fire, Brown plead guilty to perverting justice. He was sentenced to 4 months imprisonment on 2 October 2025.
