= Shane Withington =

Australian actor (born 1958)

- Born: 22 August 1958 (age 68); Toowoomba, Queensland, Australia
- Occupation: Actor
- Years active: 1978–present
- Known for: A Country Practice (TV series) as Brenden Jones; Home and Away (TV series) as John Palmer
- Spouse: Anne Tenney

Shane Withington (born 22 August 1958) is an Australian actor, notable for roles in theatre, television, and film.

== Career ==
In 1984, Withington appeared as motorcycle cop Fred "Speedy" Norton in the film Queen of the Road, alongside Joanne Samuel and Amanda Muggleton. One of Withington's best known roles was Brendan Jones, a farmer, nurse, and subsequently the Deputy Matron of the fictional Wandin Valley in the television series A Country Practice from the pilot in 1981 until 1986. In 1987, he starred in the television comedy series Willing and Abel as Abel Moore.

From late 1987 until early 1988, he was part of the supporting cast of role of The Flying Doctors as geophysicist Mike Lancaster, who was a love interest for lead character Dr Chris Randall (Liz Burch). Withington appeared in the sitcom The Family Business in 1989. He also co-starred in the play The Boys Next Door in 1992.

He had a guest star appearance in the film Strange Bedfellows in 2004. In 2008, he was in the BBC drama Out of the Blue, playing the detective in charge of investigating a murder.

Withington first appeared in the television serial Home and Away as helicopter pilot Colin Page, before being given the permanent role of cranky but warm-hearted surf lifesaver and patrol officer John Palmer in 2009, initially as a 3-month stand-alone stint; he'd been in the role for ten years by 2019.

== Personal life ==
Withington was born in Toowoomba, Queensland to a cowgirl mother, who was the daughter of a drover and an English father who worked in food processing and was a nightclub singer and champion first grade soccer player in Queensland.

After being expelled from school, Withington worked as a horsesman and jackaroo, before auditioning an acting scholarship with the Elizabethan Quest Scholarship at 16. He toured with the Twelfth Night Theatre.

Withington lives in the Pittwater area of Sydney's Northern Beaches and led a community campaign to preserve the Currawong Workers' Holiday Camp.

Withington is married to actress Anne Tenney, who played his character's wife Molly Jones on A Country Practice.

== Filmography ==
Film performances
| Year | Title | Role | Notes |
|---|---|---|---|
| 1988 | Black Tulip | | Voice role |
| 1991 | Roy's Raiders | Bazza | |
| 2004 | Strange Bedfellows | Father Xavier Delaney | |
| 2018 | The Confession | Father Shane | Short |
| 2023 | Butter | Farmer | Short |

Television performances
| Year | Title | Role | Notes |
|---|---|---|---|
| 1978 | Chopper Squad | William "Mac" McKenna | Season 2, episode 3 |
| 1978 | Glenview High | Edward Lander | Season 1, episode 13 |
| 1981–1986 | A Country Practice | Brendan Jones | Main cast |
| 1984 | Queen of the Road | Fred "Speedy" Norton | TV movie |
| 1987 | Willing and Abel | Abel Moore | 26 episodes |
| 1987–1988 | The Flying Doctors | Mike Lancaster | 9 episodes |
| 1989 | The Family Business | Terry Jackson | 13 episodes |
| 1997 | Water Rats | Det. Insp. Gordon Withers | 2 episodes |
| 1997 | Reprisal | Charlie | TV movie |
| 1998 | Wildside | Alan Grey | Season 1, episode 13 |
| 1999 | Dog's Head Bay | Bob Grant | 13 episodes |
| 2005 | All Saints | Bob "Smithy" Smith | Season 8, episode 29 |
| 2005 | Blinky Bill's White Christmas | Sly (Chopper's assistant) and Johnny Rabbit | TV movie Voice role |
| 2006 | Home and Away | Colin Page | Guest |
| 2006–2010 | Dive Olly Dive! | Various characters | 56 episodes |
| 2007 | Rain Shadow | Harry Greene | Miniseries |
| 2007 | Gumnutz: A Juicy Tale | | TV movie Voice role |
| 2008 | Out of the Blue | D.S. Simon Wilson | 43 episodes |
| 2008–2009 | Milly, Molly | Narrator | Two seasons |
| 2009–present | Home and Away | John Palmer | Main cast |
| 2017, 2019 | Drop Dead Weird | Wilmot Fogie / Mr O'Shea | 2 episodes |
| 2024 | Last Days of the Space Age | Spider | 2 episodes |
