= The Family Business (Australian TV series) =

- Written by: Gary Reilly
- Starring: Shane Withington; Tony Sheldon
- Country of origin: Australia
- Original language: English
- No. of episodes: 13

Production
- Producer: Gary Reilly
- Running time: 30 mins

Original release
- Release: 1989

The Family Business is a 1989 Australian sitcom about two sisters and their husbands who live near each other.
