= Arrow Research Corporation =

Australian software company

Arrow Research Corporation is an Australian software company that specializes in the development of financial and accounting software. Arrow software includes Tencia, ArrowFinancials and ArrowSQL. It was established in 1989 and its headquarters are located in Melbourne, Victoria.
