= Khan Chittenden =

Australian actor

Khan Chittenden (born 1983 in New Zealand) is a New Zealand-born Australian actor.

== Career ==
Chittenden was born in New Zealand and moved at age 11 to Perth, Western Australia. He graduated from WAAPA (Western Australian Academy of Performing Arts) and landed his first major part as Dean "Edge" Edgely in the television series Blue Water High. Khan shot numerous commercials and has done much voiceover work for W.A. based agencies Brainestorm and DoubleDragon – as well as appearing in a couple of short films.

Following Blue Water High, Khan signed on for the Foxtel TV series Dangerous and was cast in the globally successful indie film Clubland (USA title: Introducing the Dwights). The success of this film landed him his first US-based film role in Endless Bummer. He has since also appeared on the stage at His Majesty's Theatre in Perth for Perth Theatre Company's production of Peter Shaffer's Equus.

In 2024 Chittenden was named as part of the cast for Stan drama series Invisible Boys.

== Filmography ==
=== Television appearances ===
Year	Title	Role	Notes
2026	Run	Sam Quilty	TV series: 4 episodes
2025	Invisible Boys	Cal Roth	TV series
2014	Parer's War	Fred Street	TV movie
2014	Home and Away	Sean Green	4 episodes
2011-13	Underbelly	Frank Green	14 episodes
2013	Paper Giants: Magazine Wars	Nick Trumpet	2 episodes
2012	Devil's Dust	Bruce Banton	2 episodes
2010	Sisters of War	Len	TV movie
2009	All Saints	Corey	1 episode
2008	Packed to the Rafters	Ewan	1 episode
2007	Dangerous	Dean	8 episodes
2005-06	Blue Water High	Dean 'Edge' Edgely	27 episodes
2005	The Alice	Sparrow	1 episode
1997	The Gift	Leo	TV series

=== Film appearances ===
Year	Title	Role	Notes
2021	Little Tornadoes	Young Jim	
2021	Rhapsody of Love	Phil McEnjoe	
2018	Book Week	Adam	
2015	Nulla Nulla	White Cop	Short
2014	Notes	Greg	Short
2013	Canopy	Jim	
2010	Needle	Jed	
2010	Loveless	Tom	Short
2009	Endless Bummer	JD	
2009	In Her Skin	Manni	
2007	West	Pete	
2007	Clubland (2007 film)	Tim	
2006	Wobbegong	Jared	Short
2006	The Caterpillar Wish	Joel Roberts	
2005	Three to One	Paul	Short
