= MC Tee Vee =

Television series

MC Tee Vee is a music program that was broadcast on Australia's SBS TV television network in the early- to mid-1990s. It was a 30-minute dance music video showcase hosted by Annette Shun Wah.

MC Tee Vee was included in Television.au's SBS history of programming highlights.

The program was the first Australian national broadcast television music program dedicated to dance, rap and house music.

== See also ==
- List of Australian music television shows
