= Gabrielle Scollay =

Australian actress

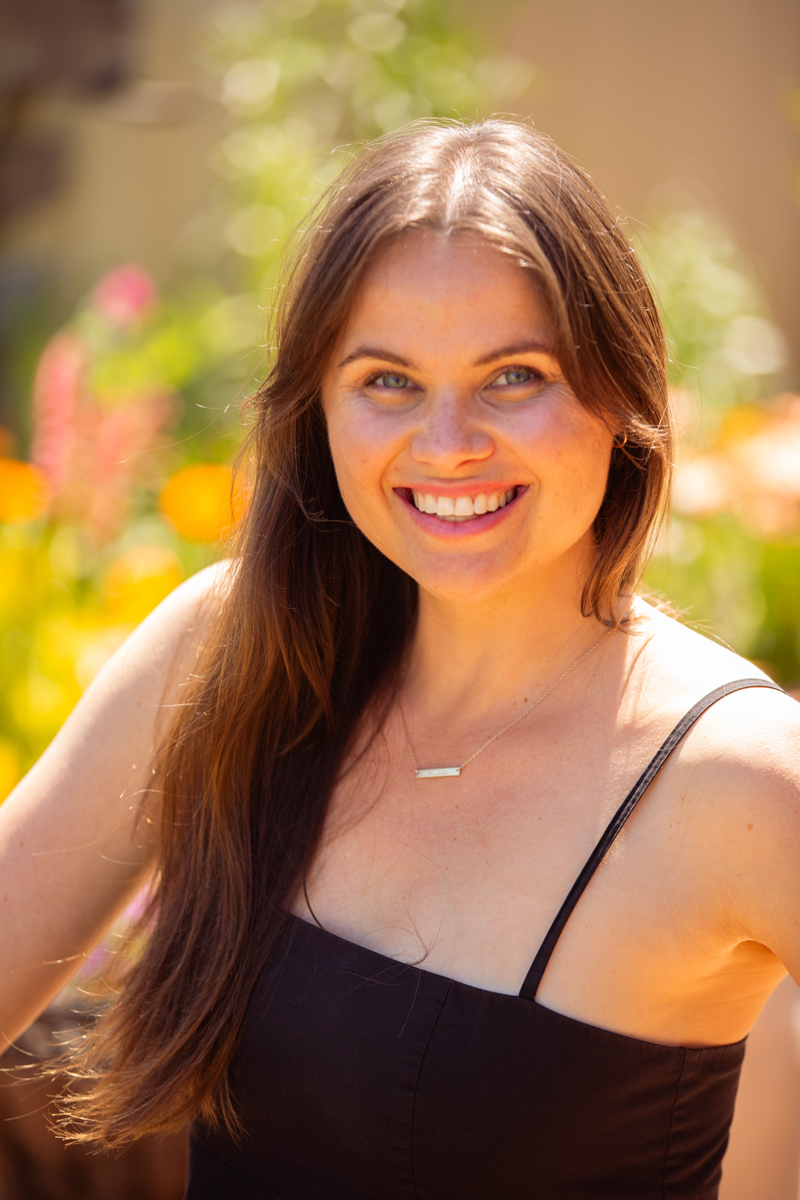
- Born: 6 April 1989 (age 37); Newcastle, New South Wales, Australia
- Occupation: Actress
- Years active: 2006–present
- Website: http://sustainablygabrielle.com

Gabrielle Scollay (born 6 April 1989) is an Australian actress known for the role of Amy in the second season of the television series Blue Water High. She has been involved in many successful film and television projects including Dangerous (2007), Home and Away (2007), A Model Daughter: The Killing of Caroline Byrne (2009), Rescue: Special Ops (2011), and Dance Academy (2012).

== Filmography ==
- Mrs S as Steph (2017)
- The Hungry Mile: The Heretic music Video (2013)
- Urthboy "Knee Length Socks" Music Video (2012)
- Dance Academy as Lexie (2012)
- Rescue: Special Ops as Kate Marchelo (2011)
- A Model Daughter – The Killing of Caroline Byrne as Deanna Byrne (2009)
- Home and Away as Tamsyn Armstrong (2007)
- Dangerous as Catriona (6 episodes, 2007)
- Blue Water High as Amy (26 episodes, 2006)
