= Sophie Luck =

Australian actress

Sophie Kathlyn Luck
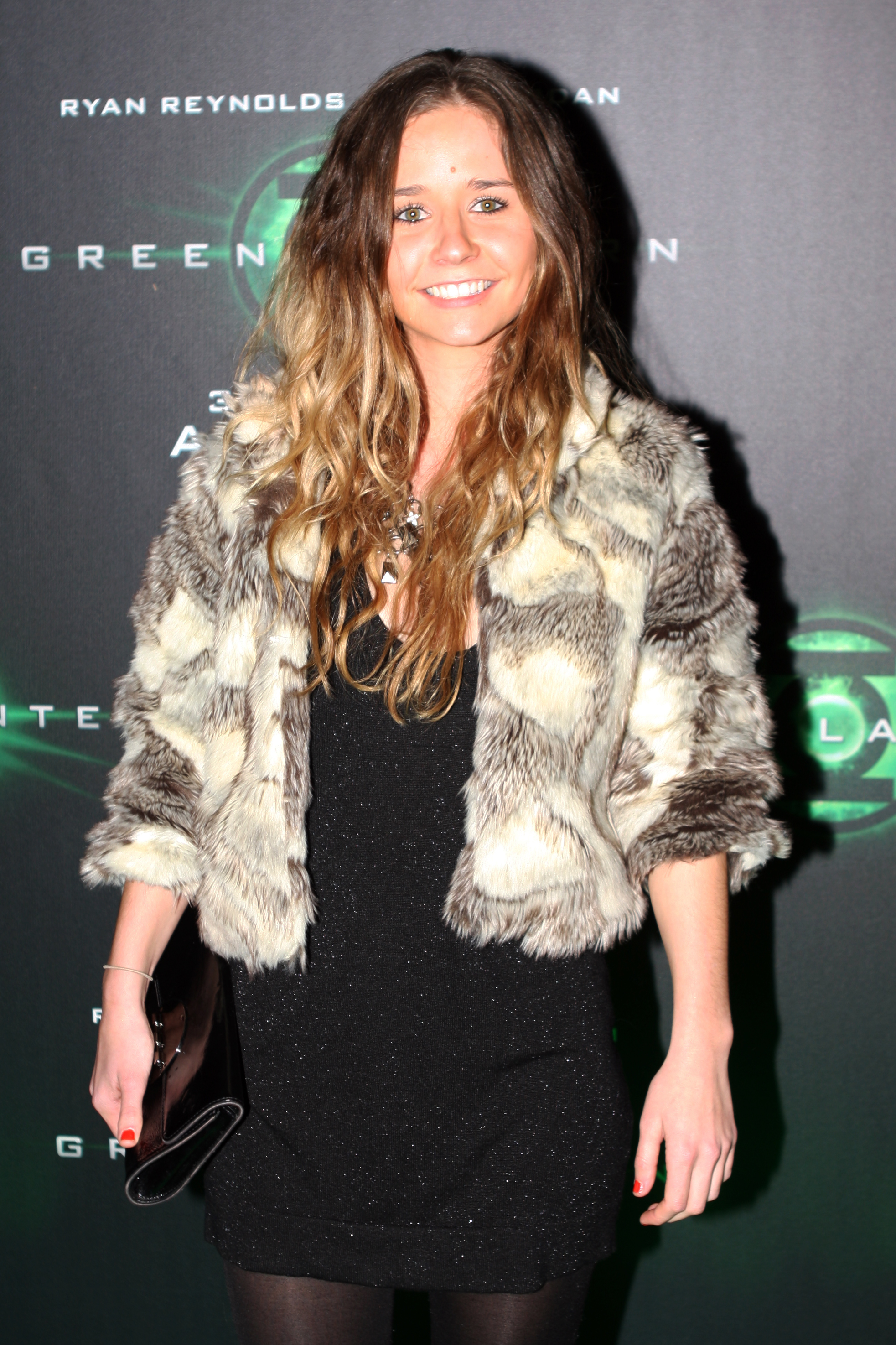
- Luck in August 2011
- Born: 17 October 1989 (age 36); Pymble, Sydney, Australia
- Years active: 2000-present

Sophie Kathrin Luck (born 17 October 1989) is an Australian actress best known for her roles on the television shows Blue Water High and Home and Away.

== Biography ==
=== Personal life ===
Luck has had drama lessons since the age of seven. She has trained with the Performing Arts Academy, and is currently continuing her acting and singing courses in its professional training program. In her spare time Luck enjoys dancing, surfing, horse riding and spending time with friends. She attended Crestwood High School (although she was tutored while on set) and undertook the Higher School Certificate in 2007. Luck is a Christian and attends Hillsong Church. She has a younger sister, Stephanie, who also attended Crestwood High School.

=== Film & TV ===
Luck had a five-month role on Home and Away as Tamara Simpson. Luck starred in Blue Water High as Fiona "Fly" Watson, appearing in all three seasons. Other film and TV credits include Don't Blame Me, Snobs and Water Rats. On 3 February 2009, Luck guest starred on the Season 12 premiere of All Saints as 'Lacey'.

=== Awards ===
Luck won the 2005 Australian Film Institute Award for Best Young Actor. She was also nominated for a 2007 Nickelodeon Kids' Choice Award.

== Filmography ==
=== Film ===
Year	Title	Role	Notes
2010	The Fall	Julie	Short film
2012	Circle of Lies	Unknown / unnamed role	
2014	The Toy Soldiers	Bikini Girl	
2014	Pandorian	Kira Somers	Short film

=== Television ===
Year	Title	Role	Notes
2000	Water Rats	Polly Fleet	Episode: "Chinese Checkers"
2002-03	Don't Blame Me		TV series
2003	Home and Away	Tamara Simpson	Recurring role; season 16 (10 episodes); Additionally appeared in the exclusive video-only episode Home and Away: Hearts Divided
2003	Snobs	Town Girl	Season 1, episode 7
2005–08	Blue Water High	Fiona 'Fly' Watson	Main role; 2 seasons (52 episodes) (2005–06); Guest role; season 3, episode 11 (2008)
2009	All Saints	Lacey	Season 12, episode 1: "Out of the Ashes"
2012–15	SYD2030	Frankie Goldstein	2 seasons (23 episodes)
2013	Whoopa-chow!	Serena	TV series
