= The Man from Snowy River: Arena Spectacular (film) =

- DVD cover
- Directed by: David Atkins; Ignatius Jones
- Written by: Banjo Paterson (poem); David Atkins; Ignatius Jones; Jonathan Biggins (extra dialogue); Phillip Scott (extra dialogue)
- Produced by: David Atkins; Kevin Jacobsen; Amber Jacobsen; Lesley Shaw
- Starring: Charles "Bud" Tingwell; Georgie Parker; Steve Bisley; Lee Kernaghan; Martin Crewes
- Music by: Bruce Rowland; Lee Kernaghan; Garth Porter
- Distributed by: Roadshow Entertainment
- Release date: 26 January 2003
- Running time: 101 minutes
- Country: Australia
- Language: English

The Man from Snowy River: Arena Spectacular was a musical theatre production based on Banjo Paterson's poem The Man from Snowy River. The production was filmed at the Brisbane Entertainment Centre in Brisbane, Queensland, Australia, during October 2002, and was released on DVD and VHS in Australia on 26 January 2003 (Australia Day).

The musical was presented by Jacobsen Entertainment and David Atkins Enterprises.

The creative team for the show were David Atkins (co-creator, co-writer, director and executive producer), Ignatius Jones (co-writer and director) and Kevin Jacobsen (executive producer). Extra dialogue was written for the show by Jonathan Biggins and Phillip Scott.

All poetry narrated in the musical was written by Banjo Paterson, including "Waltzing Matilda" (for which the music was written by Marie Cowan).

Bruce Rowland, who composed the instrumental music for both the 1982 film The Man from Snowy River and its 1988 sequel The Man from Snowy River II (American title: Return to Snowy River), composed special arrangements of some of his music for the musical. He also conducted the orchestra.

Lee Kernaghan and Garth Porter wrote the music and lyrics for the country songs. During the concert scene, Lee Kernaghan also sang some country songs which he had already recorded on some of his albums.

The screen images, photographed by Ross Dunstan, were provided by Australian Geographic and are featured in their book The Snowy Mountains.

The "crack riders" (expert riders) in the musical wore Akubra hats and Driza-Bone riding coats.

== Awards and nominations for the musical ==
=== Awards ===
- Winner: 2002 ARIA award for The Man from Snowy River: Arena Spectacular (Original Cast Recording) for Best Original Show/Cast Album (2002)
- Winner: ARIA Award for Bruce Rowland for Best Score for The Man from Snowy River: Arena Spectacular (Original Cast Recording)
- Winner: David Atkins and Ignatius Jones for Direction and Staging
- Winner: Conrad Helfrich for Musical Direction in a Musical Production
- Winner: Morris Lyda for Technical Design

=== Nominations ===
- Nominee: Peter Milne for Projections/Set/Designs
- Nominee: Wyn Milsom for Sound Design
- Nominee: Martin Crewes for Male Artist in a Leading Role

== Plot ==
On John Conroy's property, the 2-year-old colts and fillies are mustered and brought to the homestead for horse breaking. Two of the colts are of very good stock, especially the beautiful and spirited colt from the famous racehorse old Regret (John Conroy says that the colt is worth a thousand pounds (£1000) and that he wants the colt to eventually be the stud horse for the property).

Jim Ryan arrives at John Conroy's property following the death of his father. When he and Conroy's daughter, Kate, see each other, it is love at first sight for them both.

Jim, however, finds resentment at his presence at the station, both from John Conroy, the owner of the property, and the station's stockmen and station hands, with Dan Mulligan (the leading hand), disdainfully commenting "We don't want any swagmen here". Saltbush and McGinness McGee also make disparaging remarks about Jim Ryan's horse, with Saltbush sarcastically asking Jim if he bought his horse from a Mark Foy's catalogue, and McGinness McGee commenting that it was more likely that the horse had been saved from a glue factory.

John Conroy also comments that they have enough men working on the property already. Kate pleads with her father to give Jim a job at the property, and he finally relents, saying that Jim can help break the horses. John Conroy resents it when Jim Ryan says that he knows of a better way to break horses than the horse-breaking method being used at the property. However, John Conroy says that Jim could prove his expertise in horse-breaking by breaking the colt from old Regret.

During the night, the Brumby herd gallops close to the homestead, and the colt from old Regret breaks free from his tethers and joins them. John Conroy is furious at the loss of his prized colt, and unfairly blames Jim for what has occurred. Conroy decides to get all the crack riders (expert horse riders) from the stations near and far to muster at the homestead and hunt for the Brumbies, offering a reward of £1000, and angrily orders Jim to leave the property first thing in the morning.

The crack riders gather at the homestead the following morning, including Harrison, who made his fortune when Pardon won the cup (a reference to the President's Cup, a lesser known race held in Manindie, New South Wales). Another crack rider at the homestead was Clancy of the Overflow (who was a friend of Jim). Jim shyly turns up to join in the ride to hunt for the colt and Brumbies, but finds that, apart from his friend, Clancy, he is not wanted by anyone on the ride. Clancy convinces the others that, as both Jim and his horse were mountain-reared, they would be of great help in the ride.

The Brumbies are too quick for the riders and, when it becomes too steep and dangerous with wombat holes (burrows, where a horse could break a leg), all riders stop short of the dangerous descent — apart from Jim, who continues to chase the Brumby herd - finally bringing the herd (including the colt) back to John Conroy's property.

John Conroy is delighted to have his colt back again, and gives his approval to Jim marrying Kate. A concert and country dance, as well as a superb equestrian pageant, are then held in celebration and recognition of Jim's deed, and all ends happily.

== Cast members ==
=== Actors and actresses ===
- Georgie Parker as Kate Conroy
- Charles "Bud" Tingwell as John Conroy (Kate's father, the owner of the property)
- Steve Bisley as Banjo Paterson
- Lee Kernaghan as the Balladeer
- Martin Crewes as Jim Ryan (The Man) — (also rider)
- Simon Westaway as Dan Mulligan, the leading hand
- John Brady as Saltbush Bill — (also whipcracking and rope tricks)
- James Rutty as McGinness McGee
- Steve Jefferys as the Breaker — (also rider of rearing horse)
- Deb Mitchelmore as John Brady's whips and ropes assistant

=== The Snowy River Band ===
- Lee Kernaghan (vocalist/guitarist)
- Robyn McKelvie (keyboard player)
- Mick Albeck (fiddle player)
- James Gillard (vocalist/guitarist)
- Jake Lardot (guitarist)
- Lawrie Minson (vocalist/guitarist)
- Rudy Miranda (drummer)
- Brendan Radford (vocalist/guitarist)
- Travis Sinclair (vocalist/guitarist)

=== Dancers and acrobats ===
- Troy Honeysett (acrobat)
- Mark Fannin (dancer)

=== Horse riders ===
==== A - H ====
- Martin Addy (crack rider – "spinner"/station hand rider/station hand)
- Dene Barram (rider)
- Wayne Biffin (crack rider – "whip")
- Grant Biffin (crack rider – "whip"/station hand rider/station hand)
- Heath Biffin (crack rider – "whip"/station hand rider/station hand)
- Rona Bowman (rider/trick horse handler)
- Deborah Anne Brennan (trick rider)
- John Bush (crack rider – "hat")
- Tim Conroy (crack rider – "spinner"/stunt rider/station hand)
- Martin Crewes (Jim Ryan)
- Wayne Glennie (crack rider – "hat"/station hand)
- West Hartley (rider)
- D. J. Hendren (rider)
- P. J. Hendry (rider)

==== J - W ====
- Steve Jefferys (the Breaker)
- Kevin Kasper (station hand/station hand rider/pick-up rider)
- Mark Kasper (crack rider – "hat"/station hand rider/station hand/pick-up rider)
- Sandra Langsford (crack rider – "spinner")
- Shannon Ryan (rider/stable hand)
- Peter Schipp (crack rider – "rope"/trick rider)
- Zelie Thompson (trick rider)
- Rhett Thomson (buck rider)
- Troy Thomson (crack rider – "rope"/buck rider)
- Barry Thurlow (rider)
- Troy Welsh (crack rider – "rope"/buck rider)

=== Buckboard and coach drivers ===
- Don Bourke (buckboard driver/coach transfer)
- Don Cross (buckboard driver)
- Don Ross (Cobb & Co coach driver)
- Scott Goodall (Cobb & Co coach driver)

=== Horse trainers and handlers ===
- Steve Jefferys (horse rearing and horse whispering)
- Tony Jablonski (horse co-ordinator)
- Donna Morton (horse co-ordinator)
- Kevin Kasper (brumby co-ordinator)
- Don Eyb|Snr Sgt Don Eyb (horse quadrille master)
- Rona Bowman (trick riding handler)
- Barry Thurlow (liberty handler assistant)

== DVD ==
=== Chapter listing ===
==== Act 1 ====
1. Prelude
2. Mustering the Colts
3. The Homestead
4. Jim's Entrance – The Man Arrives
5. Breaking the Colts
6. The Horse Whisperer
7. The Breakout
8. The Confrontation
9. The Cracks Gather/Musical Ride

==== Act 2 ====
1. Musical Entrance – "Waltzing Matilda" (Queensland version)
2. Tall Stories
3. The Man and Kate – A Kiss for Luck
4. The Departures
5. The Ride
6. The Return and Celebrations
7. The Concert
8. Musical Ride
9. Finale
10. The Swagman Returns

=== Special features ===
- Outside the Arena — Behind the Scenes (The Making of The Man from Snowy River: Arena Spectacular)

Narrated by David Atkins (includes interviews with members of the cast).

- Opening the Stable Door

Names and information about the horses in the show — and about Jana the Border Collie (Banjo's dog).

- Wood Chopping — intermission entertainment:

Woodchoppers: Sean Harper, Lindsay Hewill, Peter Windley and Mal Windley (who was also the co-ordinator)

- Cast and crew biographies

== Notes ==
Although also based on The Man from Snowy River (poem), the arena spectacular has no connection whatsoever with either the films or the television series of the same name.
