= The Man from Snowy River =

The Man from Snowy River may refer to:

- "The Man from Snowy River" (poem), an 1890 Australian poem by Banjo Paterson.
- The Man from Snowy River and Other Verses an 1895 poetry collection by Banjo Paterson (including the above)
- The Man from Snowy River (1920 film), a silent black & white film
- The Man from Snowy River (1982 film), an Australian Western drama film
  - The Man from Snowy River (soundtrack) (the soundtrack for the 1982 film The Man from Snowy River)
  - The Man from Snowy River II, the 1988 sequel to the 1982 film
    - Return to Snowy River (the soundtrack for the 1988 sequel film The Man from Snowy River II)
- The Man from Snowy River (TV series)
- The Man from Snowy River: Arena Spectacular, a musical theatre production which toured Australia during 2002
  - The Man from Snowy River: Arena Spectacular (film)
  - The Man from Snowy River: Arena Spectacular (original soundtrack) (the original musical cast album)
