= The Man from Snowy River: Arena Spectacular (original soundtrack) =

2002 studio album

Studio album by Original Australian cast of The Man from Snowy River: Arena Spectacular
- Released: 2002
- Recorded: 2002
- Genre: cast recording
- Label: ABC Music
- Producers: Garth Porter; Conrad Helfrich

The Man from Snowy River: Arena Spectacular is a musical by David Atkins and Ignatius Jones, based on the poem The Man from Snowy River, written by Banjo Paterson.

All poetry narrated in the musical was written by Banjo Paterson, including "Waltzing Matilda" (for which the music was written by Marie Cowan).

Bruce Rowland composed the instrumental music for both the 1982 film The Man from Snowy River film and its sequel 1988 film The Man from Snowy River II (American title for the 1988 sequel: "Return to Snowy River"). Rowland composed special arrangements of some of his music for "The Man from Snowy River: Arena Spectacular" musical and also conducted the orchestra, Victorian Philharmonic Orchestra – orchestration.

Lee Kernaghan and Garth Porter wrote the music and lyrics for the country songs. Lee Kernaghan also sang some of the country songs (which he had already recorded on some of his albums), during the concert scene.

AT the ARIA Music Awards of 2002, the soundtrack won Best Original Soundtrack, Cast or Show Album.

== Track listing ==
1. "Waltzing Matilda" — (Traditional version) — Instrumental — music composed by M. Cowan, poem (lyrics) written by Banjo Paterson
2. "Prelude" — poem written by Banjo Paterson — narrated by Steve Bisley
3. "Mustering the Colts" — Instrumental — music composed by Bruce Rowland
4. "Spirit of the High Country" — music and lyrics by Lee Kernaghan and Garth Porter — sung by Lee Kernaghan
5. "Southern Son" — music and lyrics by Lee Kernaghan and Garth Porter — sung by Martin Crewes
6. "Snowy Mountains Buck Jump" — music and lyrics by Lee Kernaghan and Garth Porter — sung by Lee Kernaghan
7. "Jessica's Theme" — Instrumental — music composed by Bruce Rowland
8. "The Rope That Pulls the Wind" — music and lyrics by Lee Kernaghan and Garth Porter — sung by Martin Crewes
9. "The Breakout" — Instrumental — music composed by Bruce Rowland
10. "Kosciusko Moon" — music and lyrics by Lee Kernaghan and Garth Porter — sung by Martin Crewes and Georgie Parker
11. "Boys From the Bush" — music and lyrics by Lee Kernaghan and Garth Porter — sung by Lee Kernaghan
12. "Waltzing Matilda" — (Queensland version) — Instrumental — music composed by Bruce Rowland
13. "Pull the Other One Mate" — music and lyrics by Lee Kernaghan and Garth Porter — sung by Lee Kernaghan and the Riders
14. "Eureka Creek" — Instrumental — music composed by Bruce Rowland
15. "A Handful of Dust" — music and lyrics by Lee Kernaghan and Garth Porter — sung by Martin Crewes and Georgie Parker
16. "As Long As Your Eyes Are Blue" — music (for "Clancy's Theme") composed by Bruce Rowland — poem (lyrics) written by Banjo Paterson — sung by Georgie Parker
17. "The Departure, The Ride, The Return" — Instrumental — music composed by Bruce Rowland
18. "The Man from Snowy River" — poem written by Banjo Paterson — narrated by Steve Bisley
19. "Spirit of the High Country" (Reprise) — music and lyrics by Lee Kernaghan and Garth Porter — sung by Lee Kernaghan
20. "Waltzing Matilda" — (Traditional version) — Instrumental — music composed by M. Cowan — poem written by Banjo Paterson
21. "Epilogue - A Singer of the Bush" — poem written by Banjo Paterson — narrated by Steve Bisley

== Personnel ==
=== Performers ===
==== Cast Members ====
- Steve Bisley – cast member as "Banjo Patterson"
- Martin Crewes – cast member and singer: as "Jim Ryan" (The 'Man')
- Georgie Parker – cast member and singer as "Kate Conroy"
- Lee Kernaghan – musician and singer

==== Musicians ====
- Jake Lardot – musician
- Mick Albeck – musician
- Mitch Farmer — musician
- James Gillard – musician
- Tommy Grasso – musician
- Conrad Helfrich – musician
- Rod McCormack – musician
- Robyn McKelvie – musician
- Lawrie Minson – musician
- Mark Punch – musician
- Michel Rose – musician

=== Production ===
- David Atkins – executive producer
- David Cheshire – assistant engineer
- Greg Ellis – copying and score preparation
- Robin Grey – engineer
- Conrad Helfrich – producer / additional arrangements and score preparation
- Ted Howard – engineer
- Amber Jacobsen – executive producer
- Giles Muldoon – assistant engineer
- Garth Porter – music composer and producer
- Bruce Rowland – music composer / music conductor /music arranger
