= The Man from Snowy River (soundtrack) =

The Man from Snowy River (1982 film)

Soundtrack album by Bruce Rowland
- Released: 1982
- Recorded: 1982
- Genre: Soundtrack
- Label: Festival Records (Australia); Varèse Sarabande (USA)

Professional ratings
Review scores
| Source | Rating |
|---|---|
| Allmusic | link |

The Man from Snowy River is the original motion picture soundtrack from the 1982 film The Man from Snowy River.

Bruce Rowland composed the music for the film, and also conducted the orchestra during the recording of the album. The sound engineer for the recording was Roger Savage.

Later, Bruce Rowland composed a special Olympics version of the "Main Title" theme for the 2000 Summer Olympics opening ceremony.

Also, both the "Main Title" and "Jessica's Theme", from the film's soundtrack were reprised as part of the cast album soundtrack of the 2002 musical The Man from Snowy River: Arena Spectacular.

A pastiche of the "Main Title" appeared in the post-credits scene of Napoleon Dynamite.

== Australian soundtrack ==
=== Track listing ===
1. "Main Title"
2. "Clancy's Theme"
3. "Henry Dies / Farewell To Frew"
4. "Harrison's Homestead / Jim Gets His Horse"
5. "Mountain Theme"
6. "The Brumbies"
7. "Jessica's Sonata"
8. "Tom Fool's Knot"
9. "Searching for Jessica"
10. "Jessica's Theme" — (Breaking in the Colt)
11. "The Chase"
12. "Rosemary Recalls"
13. "Jim's Ride"
14. "Jim Brings in the Brumbies"
15. "Closing Titles"

== United States soundtrack ==
=== Track listing ===
The Man from Snowy River (1982 film) — (American CD cover) USA label: Varèse Sarabande

The American album of the film soundtrack has the track listing in a different order to the Australian track listing, and is missing Tom Fool's Knot.

The American track listing of the soundtrack is as follows:

1. "Main Title"
2. "Jim's Ride"
3. "The Chase"
4. "Jessica's Theme (Breaking in the Colt)"
5. "Henry Dies (Farewell To Frew)"
6. "Rosemary Recalls"
7. "Mountain Theme"
8. "Jessica's Sonata"
9. "Jim Brings in the Brumbies"
10. "Clancy's Theme"
11. "Harrison's Homestead (Jim Gets His Horse)"
12. "The Brumbies"
13. "Searching for Jessica"
14. "End Titles"

=== Charts ===
| Chart (1982) | Peak position |
|---|---|
| Australia (Kent Music Report) | 48 |

== Awards ==
- Winner: AFI award for Bruce Rowland for Best Score — The Man from Snowy River (1982)
- Winner: APRA award for Bruce Rowland for Best Score — The Man from Snowy River (1984)
