= Stephen Jefferies =

Stephen Jefferies may refer to:

- Stephen Jefferies (cricketer) (born 1959), South African cricketer
- Stephen Jefferies (dancer) (born 1951), ballet dancer, artistic director and choreographer

== See also ==
- Stephen Jeffreys (1950–2018), British playwright and playwriting teacher
- Steve Jefferys, lone horse rider in the Sydney Olympics opening ceremony
- Stephen Geoffreys (born 1964), American actor
