= Everything in Between (2022 film) =

Feature Film

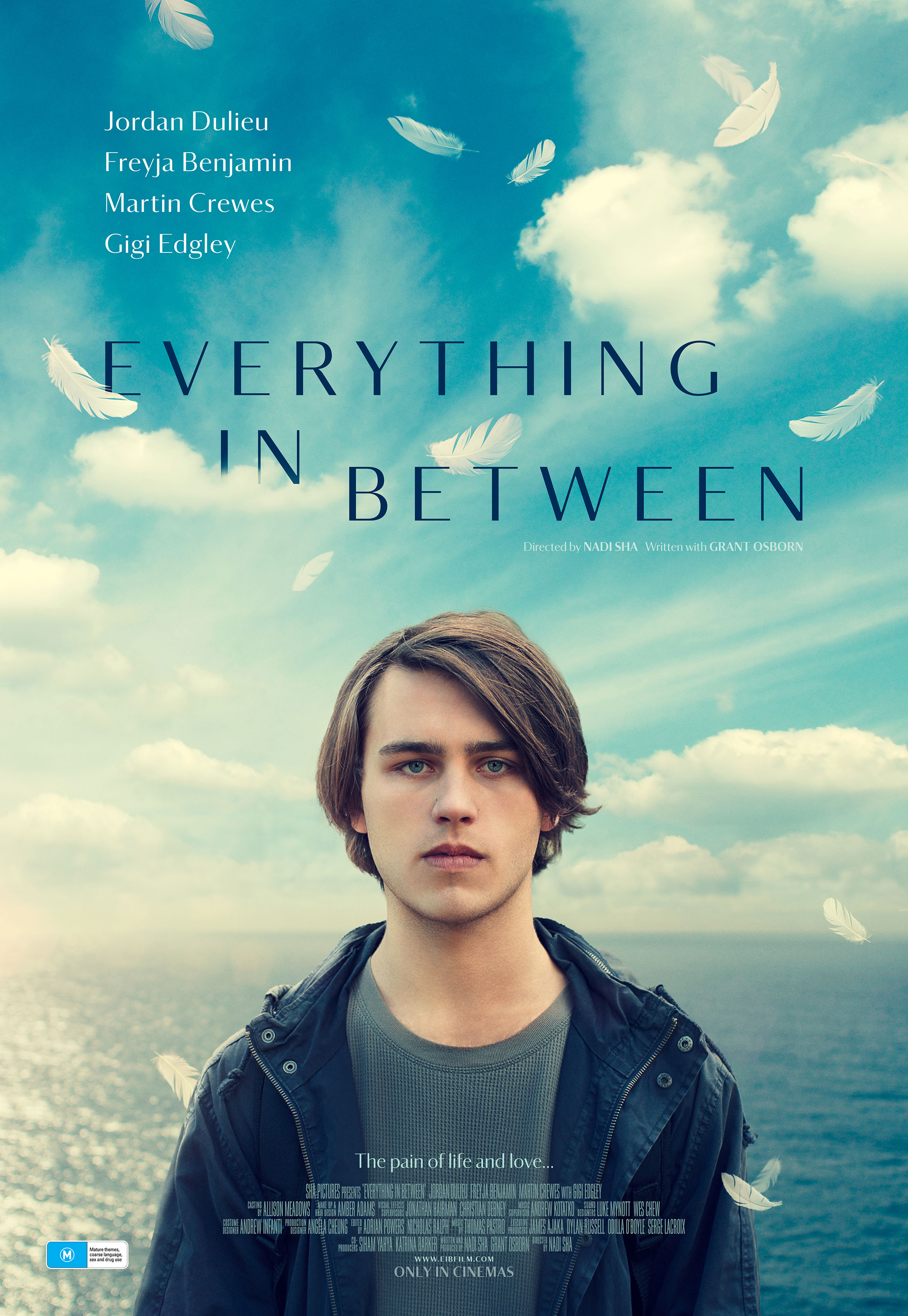
- Official theatrical release poster
- Directed by: Nadi Sha
- Written by: Nadi Sha, Grant Osborn
- Produced by: Nadi Sha, Grant Osborn
- Starring: Jordan Dulieu, Freyja Benjamin, Gigi Edgley, Martin Crewes
- Edited by: Adrian Powers, Nicholas Ralph
- Music by: Tom Pastro
- Production company: Sha Pictures
- Release date: 20 October 2022
- Running time: 90 minutes
- Country: Australia
- Language: English
- Box office: $24,341

Everything in Between is a 2022 Australian drama film directed by Nadi Sha. The film follows an alienated teenager as he learns to find meaning and purpose in a world where he feels he doesn't belong. It stars Jordan Dulieu, Freyja Benjamin, Gigi Edgley, and Martin Crewes. The film was featured in competition under the Cannes Cinéphiles section of the 2024 Cannes Film Festival.

== Plot ==
An emotionally numb teenager, Jay Knight, survives a suicide attempt and is taken to hospital, where he meets Liz, an older free-spirited traveller being treated for Coccidioidomycosis. They form a quiet bond that becomes the first time he truly connects with someone.

As Liz speaks of a premonition that she will die and her condition worsens, Jay is drawn into her struggle. Tension rises at home, where his privileged yet jaded parents fear the relationship will unravel his fragile recovery.

Her prediction proves true. Liz’s sudden death breaks through Jay’s emotional paralysis. In grief, he discovers that feeling — even pain — is reason enough to stay alive.

== Cast ==
- Jordan Dulieu as Jason Knight
- Freyja Benjamin as Elizabeth Myers
- Gigi Edgley as Meredith Knight
- Martin Crewes as David Knight
- Siham Yahya as Dr Freeda Yussuf
- Esther Anderson as Linda
- Benjamin Matthews as Dr Lucas Armstrong
- Isabella Bucceri as Myrna

== Release ==
The film was released theatrically on October 20, 2022, in Australia, initially opening on 31 screens nationally with an additional 18 locations added in the following week. It was released in North America in February 2024 by Giant Pictures. The film is distributed in the United Kingdom by Bohemia Media.

In 2026, Everything in Between was selected by the Australian Teachers of Media (ATOM) for its Classroom Cinema Program. The film is also available to Australian schools through ClickView, where it is featured as part of the platform's Australian Movies collection.

== Reception ==
The film has garnered a box office gross of $24,341 worldwide.

=== Critical reception ===
The film received mixed to positive reviews. David Stratton awarded the film three and a half stars, praising the performances: "as Liz, Benjamin evokes the young Barbara Hershey, while Dulieu is excellent as the troubled Jay, bringing surprising nuance to what could have been a routine character. Indeed, the entire film is better than you might expect, redeemed by a better-than-average screenplay (by director Nadi Sha and Grant Osborn) and by the actors."

Martin Fabinyi remarked on the film’s subtlety and effective performances, calling Everything in Between "a small film with a big heart." A preview of the film was also featured at the 12th Beijing International Film Festival, where it received attention for its unconventional approach: "such films rewrite the beauty and pain of youth in an alternative form."
