= The Man from Snowy River: Arena Spectacular =

- Music: Bruce Rowland; Lee Kernaghan; Garth Porter
- Lyrics: Lee Kernaghan; Garth Porter
- Book: David Atkins; Ignatius Jones
- Basis: the Poem The Man from Snowy River, by Banjo Paterson
- Productions: 2002 Australia

The Man from Snowy River: Arena Spectacular, based on Banjo Paterson's poem The Man from Snowy River, was a popular musical theatre production which toured Australian capital cities twice during 2002. Kevin Jacobsen and David Atkins were the executive producers for the show. David Atkins and Ignatius Jones were co-directors and co-writers. Extra dialogue was written for the show by Jonathan Biggins and Phillip Scott.

The stage musical has no relationship to the 1982 film The Man from Snowy River, or the 1988 sequel The Man from Snowy River II, or the television series The Man from Snowy River.

All poetry narrated in the musical was written by Banjo Paterson, including the lyrics to the songs "Waltzing Matilda" (with music written by Marie Cowan), and "As Long as Your Eyes Are Blue" (the music to which was "Clancy's Theme", which was written by Bruce Rowland for the film The Man from Snowy River).

== Awards and nominations ==
=== Awards ===
- Winner: Australian Recording Industry Association award. The Man from Snowy River: Arena Spectacular (Original Cast Recording) won the ARIA award for Best Original Show / Cast Album (2002)
- Winner: David Atkins and Ignatius Jones for Direction and Staging
- Winner: Conrad Helfrich for Musical Direction in a Musical Production
- Winner: Morris Lyda for Technical Design

=== Nominations ===
- Nominee: Peter Milne for Projections/Set/Designs
- Nominee: Wyn Milsom for Sound Design
- Nominee: Martin Crewes as Jim Ryan (the Man) Green Room Award for Male Actor in a Leading Role (Music Theatre)

== Cast members ==
- Georgie Parker as Kate Conroy (John Conroy's daughter)
- Steve Bisley as Banjo Paterson
- Charles "Bud" Tingwell as John Conroy (the owner of the property)
- Lee Kernaghan as the Balladeer
- Martin Crewes as Jim Ryan (The Man)
- Simon Westaway as Dan Mulligan, the leading hand
- John Brady as Saltbush Bill (also whipcracking and rope tricks)
- Steve Jefferys as the Breaker
- James Rutty as McGinness McGee
- Deb Mitchelmore as John Brady's whips and ropes assistant
- Daniel Zimmer as a 'villager'

== Plot ==
On John Conroy's property, the 2-year-old colts and fillies are mustered and brought to the homestead for horse breaking. Two of the colts are considered to be good stock, including a colt sired by the famous racehorse old Regret. John Conroy says that the colt is worth £1,000 and wants it to eventually become the stud horse for the property.

Jim Ryan arrives at John Conroy's property following the death of his father. When he and Conroy's daughter, Kate, see each other, it is love at first sight for them both.

Jim, however, finds resentment at his presence at the station, both from John Conroy, the owner of the property, and the station's stockmen and station hands, with Dan Mulligan (the leading hand), disdainfully commenting "We don't want any swagmen here". Saltbush and McGinness McGee also make disparaging remarks about Jim Ryan's horse, with Saltbush sarcastically asking Jim if he bought his horse from a Mark Foy's catalogue, and McGinness McGee commenting that it was more likely that the horse had been saved from a glue factory.

John Conroy also comments that they have enough men working on the property already. Kate pleads with her father to give Jim a job at the property, and he finally relents, saying that Jim can help break the horses. John Conroy resents it when Jim Ryan says that he knows of a better way to break horses than the horse-breaking method being used at the property. However, John Conroy says that Jim could prove his expertise in horse-breaking by breaking the colt from old Regret.

During the night, the Brumby herd gallops close to the homestead, and the colt from old Regret breaks free from his tethers and joins them. John Conroy is furious at the loss of his prized colt, and unfairly blames Jim for what has occurred. Conroy decides to get all the crack riders (expert horse riders) from the stations near and far to muster at the homestead and hunt for the Brumbies, offering a reward of £1000, and angrily orders Jim to leave the property first thing in the morning.

The crack riders gather at the homestead the following morning, including Harrison, who made his fortune when Pardon won the cup (a reference to the President's Cup, a lesser known race held in Manindie, New South Wales). Another crack rider at the homestead was Clancy of the Overflow (who was a friend of Jim). Jim shyly turns up to join in the ride to hunt for the colt and Brumbies, but finds that, apart from his friend, Clancy, he is not wanted by anyone on the ride. Clancy convinces the others that, as both Jim and his horse were mountain-reared, they would be of great help in the ride.

The Brumbies are too quick for the riders and, when it becomes too steep and dangerous with wombat holes (burrows, where a horse could break a leg), all riders stop short of the dangerous descent — apart from Jim, who continues to chase the Brumby herd - finally bringing the herd (including the colt) back to John Conroy's property.

John Conroy is delighted to have his colt back again, and gives his approval to Jim marrying Kate. A concert and country dance, as well as an equestrian pageant, are then held in celebration and recognition of Jim's deed, and all ends happily.

== The musical — scenes, songs and poetry ==
=== Act I ===
Scene 1 — Prelude

instrumental music: "Waltzing Matilda" (Traditional version)
poem: "Prelude" (narrated by Steve Bisley)

Scene 2 — Mustering the Colts

instrumental music: "Snowy River Suite"

Scene 3 — The Homestead

song: "Spirit of the High Country" (sung by Lee Kernaghan)
poem: "The Melting of the Snow" (narrated by Charles "Bud" Tingwell and Steve Bisley)

Scene 4 — Jim's Entrance — The Man Arrives

song: "Southern Son" (sung by Martin Crewes)

Scene 5 — Breaking the Colts

song: "Snowy Mountains Buckjump" (sung by Lee Kernaghan)

Scene 6 — The Horse Whisperer

instrumental music: "Jessica's Theme"
song: "The Rope That Pulls the Wind" (sung by Martin Crewes)

Scene 7 — The Breakout

poem: "Brumby's Run" (narrated by Steve Bisley)
instrumental music: "The Breakout"

Scene 8 — The Confrontation — Jim's & Kate's First Kiss

song: "Kosciusko Moon" (sung by Martin Crewes and Georgie Parker)

Scene 9 — The Cracks Gather — Musical Ride

instrumental music: "The Man from Snowy River Theme"
song: "Boys from the Bush" (sung by Lee Kernaghan)

=== Act II ===
Musical Entrácte

instrumental music: "Waltzing Matilda" (Queensland version) (sung by Lee Kernaghan)
poem" "Daylight Is Dying" (narrated by Steve Bisley and Charles 'Bud' Tingwell)

Scene 1 — Tall Stories

song: "Pull the Other One Mate" (sung by Lee Kernaghan, Simon Westaway, James Rutty and Steve Jefferys)
instrumental "Eureka Creek"

Scene 2 — The Man and Kate — A Kiss for Luck

song: "As Long as Your Eyes Are Blue" (sung by Georgie Parker)

Scenes 3, 4 and 5

poem: "The Man from Snowy River" (narrated by Steve Bisley during scenes 3, 4 and 5)

Scene 3. instrumental music: "The Man from Snowy River Theme"

instrumental music: "The Departure"

Scene 4. instrumental music: "The Ride"
Scene 5. instrumental music: "The Return"

Scene 6 — The Concert

- Country songs and country dancing

song: "You Rock My World" (sung by Lee Kernaghan)
song: "Electric Rodeo" (sung by Lee Kernaghan)
song: "Cobar Line" (sung by Lee Kernaghan)

Scene 7 — Musical Ride

song: "Southern Son" (reprise) — (sung by Lee Kernaghan)

Scene 8 — The Finale

instrumental music: "The Man from Snowy River Theme"
song: "Spirit of the High Country" (reprise) — (sung by Lee Kernaghan)

Scene 9 — The Swagman Returns

instrumental music: "Waltzing Matilda" (Traditional version)
Epilogue: "A Singer of the Bush" (narrated by Steve Bisley)

=== Interval entertainment ===
- Woodchopping

Woodchoppers: Sean Harper, Lindsay Hewill, Mal Windley and Peter Windley

== Notes about the musical ==
Although also based on The Man from Snowy River (poem), the arena spectacular has no connection whatsoever with either the films or the television series of the same name.

Steve Jefferys and Ammo The Man from Snowy River: Arena Spectacular (advertisement)

=== Screen images ===
- The screen images, photographed by Ross Dunstan, were provided by Australian Geographic Pty Ltd and are featured in their book The Snowy Mountains.

=== Poetry ===
- Steve Bisley, in his role of Banjo, recites the poem during Act II in the scene "The Ride — parts 1–4", as well as reciting other poems by Banjo Paterson. Bud Tingwell, in his role of "John Conroy", also recited poems by Banjo Paterson.

=== Horses, riders and drivers ===
- The Man from Snowy River: Arena Spectacular had real horses performing in the show.
- During the opening sequence of The Man from Snowy River: Arena Spectacular, Steve Jefferys and his stock horse Ammo reprised their entrance at the beginning of the Sydney 2000 Olympic Games Opening Ceremony. Steve Jeffreys' wife Sandra Langsford also took part in both the Sydney 2000 Olympic Games Opening Ceremony (in which she was one of the 140 riders) and also took part in The Man from Snowy River: Arena Spectacular, in which she was one of the featured crack riders (expert riders). Steve Jefferys and Sandra Langsford also trained Ammo (the rearing horse), and Drummond (the colt from old Regret), as well as training Jana, the Border Collie (Banjo Paterson's dog).
- For his horse riding role as Jim Ryan in the production of The Man from Snowy River: Arena Spectacular, Martin Crewes, who could already ride, was given intensive riding lessons by expert riding teacher Steve Jefferys, so that Crewes would not require a body double for the difficult riding feats he had to accomplish in the show. Jefferys also taught Crewes the difficult art of being a horse whisperer for his role as Jim Ryan. Horse whispering usually takes years to learn, but Crewes was able to master this difficult skill in only two weeks.
- There was also superb riding, including intricate equestrian drill movements, and all of the animal actors ('Jana' the Border Collie, and the horses in the show) were magnificent. Horse riding stunts in the show were performed by trick riders and stunt riders, including Zelie Thompson and Deborah Brennan. The crack riders in the musical wore Akubra hats and Driza-Bone riding coats.
- The Horse Master for the show was Tony Jablonski, who had also been the Horse Master for the horse segment at the beginning of the Sydney 2000 Olympic Games Opening Ceremony.
- A Cobb & Co stagecoach, pulled by five horses, was featured in the musical.
- Also featured were a couple of buckboards, with one of the buckboards being pulled by a mare, while the second buckboard was pulled by a gelding (the buckboard horses, which were very similar in colouring, though different in size, were mother and son).

=== Whipcracking and ropes ===
- Australia's whipcracking expert John Brady demonstrated his expertise with both stockwhips and rope tricks within the show, as well as appearing in the show in the role of Saltbush.

== Cast album ==
The CD, which was released by the Australian Broadcasting Corporation in 2002, won the 2002 Australian Record Industry Association (ARIA Music Award) for Best Cast/Show Album.

Bruce Rowland, who composed the instrumental music for both the 1982 film The Man from Snowy River film and its sequel 1988 film The Man from Snowy River II (which was released in the United States of America under the title: Return to Snowy River - and released in the United Kingdom under the title: The Untamed), composed special arrangements of some of his music for the musical.

Lee Kernaghan and Garth Porter wrote the music and lyrics for the country songs. Lee Kernaghan also sang some of the country songs (which he had already recorded on some of his albums), during the concert scene.

== DVD release ==
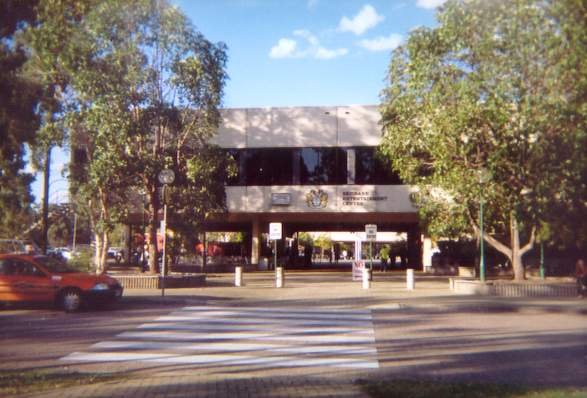
Brisbane Entertainment Centre, 2002

The Man from Snowy River: Arena Spectacular was performed all over Australia.

For both of its Brisbane runs (in 2002), the show was performed at the Brisbane Entertainment Centre in Boondall, with the musical being filmed, for DVD and videotape release, at the entertainment centre during its second run in Brisbane in October, 2002. Extra dancers and acrobats were hired for the finale of this recording. The DVD and VHS recordings of the musical were released on 26 January 2003 (Australia Day).

== See also ==
- Snowy River
