= The Man from Snowy River (TV series) =

- Cover of DVD Box Set – Season 4
- Also known as: Snowy River: The McGregor Saga
- Starring: Andrew Clarke; Wendy Hughes; Brett Climo; Hugh Jackman; Guy Pearce; Joelene Crnogorac; Sheryl Munks; Kristie Raymond; Josh Lucas; Amanda Douge; James Sherry
- Country of origin: Australia
- No. of seasons: 4
- No. of episodes: 65

Production
- Running time: 50 minutes

Original release
- Network: Nine Network
- Release: August 28, 1993 – May 24, 1998

The Man from Snowy River is an Australian adventure drama television series based on Banjo Paterson's poem "The Man from Snowy River". Released in Australia as Banjo Paterson's The Man from Snowy River, the series was subsequently released in both the United States and the United Kingdom as Snowy River: The McGregor Saga.

The series follows the adventures of Matt McGregor (Andrew Clarke), a successful Australian rancher, and his family. Matt is the hero immortalised in Banjo Paterson's poem "The Man from Snowy River", and the series is set 25 years after his famous ride. Patterson's poem was also the basis for two films The Man from Snowy River, and The Man from Snowy River II (aka Return to Snowy River).

== Synopsis ==
During the late 1800s, widower Matt McGregor, his adult sons Collin and Rob, and adolescent daughter Danni, live and work on their cattle ranch named 'Langara'. Widow Kathleen O'Neil and her young son Michael live on a nearby smaller property. To earn needed money, Kathleen teaches school and runs the local newspaper. Matt and Kathleen eventually wed, but only after overcoming Kathleen's initial reluctance.

Wealthy and unscrupulous Oliver Blackwood, along with Matt's bitter nephew Luke, habitually cause trouble for the McGregors.

== Cast ==
Stars and guest stars of the series included notable and future notable actors.

=== Main ===
- Andrew Clarke as Matt McGregor
- Brett Climo as Colin McGregor
- Wendy Hughes as Kathleen O'Neill/McGregor
- Guy Pearce as Rob McGregor
- Sheryl Munks as Emily McGregor
- Josh Lucas as Luke McGregor
- Ben Geurens as Michael O'Neil
- Jon Finlayson as James Gleeson

=== Regular ===
- Gabrielle Fitzpatrick as Montana Hale
- Rodney Bell as Frank Blackwood

=== Recurring/guests ===
Actor	Role	Ep. count
Aaron Blabey	Jimmy Wilks	1
Alan Hopgood	Gil Tyson	
Amanda Douge	Victoria Blackwood	
Andrew Curry	Miner #1	
Ben Mendelsohn	Dale Banks	1
Brett Swain	Surveyor 1	1
Brett Tucker	Ted	1
Broderick Smith		1
Bud Tingwell	Governor	1
Chad Lowe	Sam Taylor	2
Colette Mann	Mrs Carney	4
Damien Bodie	Dennis Andrews	1
Danny Adcock	Jarrod Banks	1
David Field	Dave Turner	1
Dean Stockwell	Professor Julius Waugh	2
Denise Roberts	Mary Kelly	1
Dieter Brummer	Nathan	1
Esben Storm	Frobisher	1
Fiona Corke	Lola Hatton	
Frances O'Connor	Rachel McAlister	2
Frank Gallacher	Grady Hocking	1
Greg Stone	Dr Cameron	1
Hélène Joy	Agnes Windsor	1
Henri Szeps	Jacob Verkovic	1
Hugh Jackman	Duncan Jones	5
Jane Badler	Yvonne Waugh	2
John McTernan	Connor O'Shea	1
John Stanton	Oliver Blackwood	
Jonathan Hardy	John Archer snr	1
Julie Nihill	Nora O'Reilly	1
Lee Horsley	Seamus O'Neil	3
Libby Tanner	Brodie	1
Lewis Fitz-Gerald	Henry Faulkner	1
Marshall Napier	Charlie Dunn	1
Matt Day	Pete Reilly	
Matthew Newton	Private Horsefall	1
Nell Feeney	Elsie Morgan	2
Nick Carrafa	Alan Grout	2
Nigel Bradshaw	Thomas Pascoe	
Nique Needles	PIke	1
Olivia Newton-John	Joanna Walker	3
Reg Gorman	Mr Fowler	6
Shane Connor	Tyler Morgan	2
Simon Palomares	Prince Alfredo Perez	1
Steven Vidler	Daniel Larson	1
Tim Robertson	Trooper John Clarke	1
Tony Bonner	Dave Turner	1
Tony Briggs	Toby King	1
Tracy Nelson	Ruth Whitney	5
Victoria Tennant	Anita Hargraves	5
Wynn Roberts	Sir Harry Garfield	1
Zbych Trofimiuk		1

== Awards and nominations ==
Year	Award	Category	Result	Ref
1996	Logie Awards	Logie Award for Most Popular Series	Nominated	
1996	Logie Awards	Silver Logie for Most Popular Actor (Guy Pearce)	Nominated	

== International distribution ==
When the series was distributed to some countries, the title was changed for various reasons.

Country	Title
Australia	Banjo Paterson's The Man from Snowy River
United States & Canada	Snowy River: The McGregor Saga
United Kingdom	Snowy River: The McGregor Saga
Ireland	Snowy River: The McGregor Saga
Gibraltar	Snowy River
Iran	Snowy River

The series was aired on The Family Channel in the US, BBC Two in the UK, and WIC-owned and independent stations in Canada.

== Episodes ==
=== Season 1 (1993-1994) ===
- 1 – The Race (28 August 1993)
- 2 – Pascoe's Principles (23 September 1994)
- 3 – Kathleen's Choice (23 September 1994)
- 4 – Partnerships (25 September 1994)
- 5 – Where There's Smoke (2 October 1994)
- 6 – Tracks of Gold (9 October 1994)
- 7 – Plans of Poison (16 October 1994)
- 8 – Stepping Out (23 October 1994)
- 9 – The Bushranger (30 October 1994)
- 10 – The Rustlers (6 November 1994)
- 11 – The Loneliness of Luke McGregor (13 November 1994)
- 12 – Love Finds a Way (20 November 1994)
- 13 – The Stampede (27 November 1994)

=== Season 2 (1995-1996) ===
- 1 – The Hostage (13 August 1995)
- 2 – The Savage Land (20 August 1995)
- 3 – The Railroad (27 August 1995)
- 4 – Fathers and Sons (3 September 1995)
- 5 – The Manly Art (10 September 1995)
- 6 – The Dry Argument (17 September 1995)
- 7 – Servant of the People (1 October 1995)
- 8 – The Search (8 October 1995)
- 9 – The Lost Child (15 October 1995)
- 10 – The Foundling (22 October 1995)
- 11 – The Long Arm of the Law (29 October 1995)
- 12 – The Recruit (5 November 1995)
- 13 – The Reilly Gang (12 November 1995)
- 14 – The Choice (19 November 1995)
- 15 – Man and Boy (26 November 1995)
- 16 – Flight of Fancy (11 February 1996)
- 17 – Code of Ethics (18 February 1996)
- 18 – The Cutting Edge (25 February 1996)
- 19 – House of Worship (10 March 1996)

=== Season 3 (1996) ===
- 1 – A Sea of Troubles (24 March 1996)
- 2 – Rough Passage (31 March 1996)
- 3 – The Grand Wedding (7 April 1996)
- 4 – Montana Territory (14 April 1996)
- 5 – High Country Justice (21 April 1996)
- 6 – The Question of Danni (28 April 1996)
- 7 – The Prodigal Father: Part 1 (5 May 1996)
- 8 – The Prodigal Father: Part 2 (12 May 1996)
- 9 – Fire Boy (19 May 1996)
- 10 – Blind Faith (26 May 1996)
- 11 – Shoshoni Dreaming (2 June 1996)
- 12 – The Trial of Hetti Lewis (9 June 1996)
- 13 – Toy Soldiers (16 June 1996)
- 14 – A Mid-Winter Nights Dream (23 June 1996)
- 15 – In Duty Bound (30 June 1996)
- 16 – The Lion and the Lamb (7 July 1996)
- 17 – Broken Hearts (14 July 1996)
- 18 – Deliverance (21 July 1996)
- 19 – A New Life: Part 1 (28 July 1996)
- 20 – A New Life: Part 2 (4 August 1996)

=== Season 4 (1998) ===
- 1 – Comeback (8 February 1998)
- 2 – The Grand Opening (15 February 1998)
- 3 – Black Sheep (22 February 1998)
- 4 – Prince of Hearts (1 March 1998)
- 5 – The Grand Duke (22 March 1998)
- 6 – New Business (29 March 1998)
- 7 – Foundation Day (5 April 1998)
- 8 – The Lovers (12 April 1998)
- 9 – The Claimant (19 April 1998)
- 10 – The Loaded Deck (26 April 1998)
- 11 – Difficult Times (10 May 1998)
- 12 – A Son for a Son: Part 1 (17 May 1998)
- 13 – A Son for a Son: Part 2 (24 May 1998)

== Video releases ==
On 27 June 1995, the pilot was released on VHS

On 5 March 2002, a number of single episode videos were released on VHS. These include episodes "New Business", "Grand Opening", "Black Sheep", "Comeback", "The Grand Duke", and "Prince of Hearts"

In 2003, a region 1 DVD of the series pilot was released.

DVD name	Ep#	Release date
Snowy River: The McGregor Saga – The Race	1	18 November 2003

In 2004, season 4 was released as a 3 disk set, this time in region 4. This was followed by season 1 (3 disks) and season 2 (4 disks) in 2005, and season 3 (4 disks) in 2006.

DVD name	Ep#	Release date
Banjo Paterson's The Man From Snowy River – TV Series Season 1	13	July 2005
Banjo Paterson's The Man From Snowy River – TV Series Season 2	19	December 2005
Banjo Paterson's The Man From Snowy River – TV Series Season 3	20	January 2006
Banjo Paterson's The Man From Snowy River – TV Series Season 4	13	May 2004

On 25 January 2005, three 2-episode DVDs from the series were released in region 1. These episodes were the same as they had previously released on VHS.

DVD name	Ep#	Release date	Episodes
Snowy River: The McGregor Saga – Black Sheep/Prince of Hearts	2	25 January 2005	
Snowy River: The McGregor Saga – Come Back/Grand Opening	2	25 January 2005	"Come Back", "Grand Opening"
Snowy River: The McGregor Saga – Grand Duke/New Business	2	25 January 2005	"Grand Duke", "New Business"

In 2006, a 3-episode DVD was released in region 1, containing episodes previously released on VHS and DVD. In early 2007, a second DVD was released containing the remaining three previously released episodes. Later in 2007, a third DVD was released. Though the DVD case misreports two of the episodes as titles from the previous release, the actual contents are three never-before released episodes.

DVD name	Ep#	Release date	Episodes
Snowy River: The McGregor Saga – There was more than one wild west!	3	16 November 2006	"Comeback", "The Grand Opening", "Black Sheep"
Snowy River: The McGregor Saga – Adventure in the Australian Outback	3	3 April 2007	"Prince of Hearts", "The Grand Duke", "New Business"
Snowy River: The McGregor Saga – A Different Breed of Cowboy	3	21 August 2007	"Foundation Day", "The Lovers", "The Claimant" **

- The DVD case erroneously reports the episodes as "Foundation Day", "The Grand Duke", and "New Business".

In 2008, all three of their previous DVDs was released as a set. The package contained one DVD case for "There was more than one wild west!" and a new double DVD case for the other two. The erroneous episode information for the third volume was corrected on the box and the double DVD case.

DVD name	Ep#	Release date	"Episodes"
Snowy River: The McGregor Saga Trilogy Volume 1 – 3	6	2008	"Comeback", "The Grand Opening", "Black Sheep" "Prince of Hearts", "The Grand Duke", "New Business" "Foundation Day", "The Lovers", "The Claimant"

In 2010, a combined 2-DVD package was released containing the last two DVDs (Adventure in the Australian Outback and A Different Breed of Cowboy).

DVD name	Ep#	Release date	"Episodes"
Snowy River: The McGregor Saga – Adventure in the Australian Outback/A Different Breed of Cowboy	6	9 March 2010	"Prince of Hearts", "The Grand Duke", "New Business" "Foundation Day", "The Lovers", "The Claimant"

In 2010, the entire series was released for region 4, commemorating the 120th anniversary of the poem.

DVD name	Ep#	Release date
Banjo Paterson's The Man From Snowy River – The Complete Series	65	2 April 2010
Banjo Paterson's The Man From Snowy River – Season 1	13	4 April 2011
Banjo Paterson's The Man From Snowy River – Season 2	19	4 April 2011
Banjo Paterson's The Man From Snowy River – Season 3	20	4 April 2011
Banjo Paterson's The Man From Snowy River – Season 4	13	4 April 2011

In 2011, season 1 was released for region 2 with Danish, Swedish, Norwegian and Finnish subtitles.

== Notes ==
Geoff Burrowes producer of the Snowy River films sued the producers of the series for using the title. The case settled out of court.

== See also ==
- Snowy River
- Newbury, the town where the show was filmed.

== Bilbliography ==
- The Dictionary of Performing Arts in Australia – Theatre . Film . Radio . Television – Volume 1 – Ann Atkinson, Linsay Knight, Margaret McPhee – Allen & Unwin Pty. Ltd., 1996.
