= The Mysterious Geographic Explorations of Jasper Morello =

- Promotional Poster
- Directed by: Anthony Lucas
- Written by: Mark Shirrefs
- Produced by: Anthony Lucas, Julia Lucas
- Starring: Joel Edgerton; Helmut Bakaitis; Tommy Dysart; Jude Beaumont
- Narrated by: Joel Edgerton
- Edited by: David Tait
- Music by: Bruce Rowland
- Production companies: 3d Films Pty Ltd. Australian Film Commission, Film Victoria, SBS Independent
- Distributed by: Monster Distributes
- Release date: 20 January 2005
- Running time: 26 minutes
- Country: Australia
- Language: English
- Budget: AUD 600,000

The Mysterious Geographic Explorations of Jasper Morello is a 2005 Australian animated short film. It was developed and produced in association with the Australian Film Commission; developed and produced with the assistance of Film Victoria and produced in association with SBS Independent. It was supposed to be succeeded by three other feature films: Jasper Morello and the return of Claude Belgon, Jasper Morello and the Ghost of ALTO MEA, and Jasper Morello and the Ebeneza of Gothia.

== Story ==
The film opens in the city of Gothia, a smoky industrial metropolis where steam-powered dirigibles are the primary mode of transportation, and where a terrible flesh-eating plague is decimating the population. The protagonist, royal navigator Jasper Morello (Joel Edgerton), is deployed by the government to distribute mobile weather beacons along the route of his next voyage. He has difficulty concentrating on the task, guilt-stricken over the recent death of one of his crew members which was caused by a mistake in his calculations ("one degree can be a very large distance – enough to unmake a man"). He fears for the safety of his wife, alone at home amidst the plague. Their airship the Resolution is also carrying a passenger, the eccentric Dr Claude Belgon (Helmut Bakaitis), a "controversial biologist" searching for a cure for the plague, and motivated by a thirst for fame.

Soon after taking off, the Resolution is caught up in a storm and wrecked in a collision with an abandoned vessel; Jasper loses his compass. The crew then prepares to continue on their way in the new ship. Learning that his wife Amelia, whom he left at home, has contracted the plague, Jasper despairs and tries to turn the ship around; he is sedated by Claude.

As the voyage continues, one crew member contracts the plague. The captain decides to turn around and head home, but is forestalled by the sighting of an uninhabited levitating island. While exploring there, Jasper is attacked by a large bug-like creature, which they manage to kill, despite the protests of Claude, who had wanted to capture a living specimen. Upon eating the remains of the monster, the crew notices that the boiled blood of the creature cures their sick mate. Claude insists on bringing back some cocoons of the creature to Gothia, in order to establish a breeding colony to cure the citizens.

The cocoons are brought aboard the ship. One by one they hatch, but die before Claude can determine a suitable mode of nourishment. At length he realises that they require human blood, and he feeds the single remaining creature with his own blood. Two of the crew go missing, rousing Jasper’s suspicions, but Claude sedates him again when he discovers that the doctor has been feeding the monster with them.

When Jasper revives, he is chained to the wheel and Claude tells him that the whole crew is under sedation, waiting to be fed to the creature. Jasper, without a choice, guides the ship towards home. He deliberately rams the ship into an iceberg, killing Claude.

The film ends with Jasper, left alone, attaching a blood-sucking machine to his arm to feed the last creature. Knowing that he may not survive, prior to reaching home, Jasper reassures his wife that he will be, with "The great company of souls, riding the borealis to eternity" (a reference to his previous observation, of such a sight). "Perhaps," he muses, "they will require a navigator".

== Characters ==
- Captain Otto H. Griswald – Aeronaut Captain, 7th Class
- Mr. Jasper Morello – Navigator, 3rd Royal Cartographers, Difference Engine Operator 2nd Class
- Engineer Kemp – First Engineer of the Ironclad RES
- Linesman Kovacs – One of the crew aboard the dirigible
- Mr. Emile LeBrun – The ship’s cook
- Dr Claude Belgon – Royal Academy Member, Electrical Aerologist 12th Class, Doctorate of Cloud Biology. KP, RTS, q-23P.g.k.o.
- Amelia Morello – Jasper's wife, a nurse in Gothia among the Plague victims

== Animation style ==
The short film is set in a world styled after mid-Victorian England with steampunk style iron dirigibles and steam powered computers, where giant mechanical airships are the main mode of transport. The characters are animated in the style of Wayang (Indonesian shadow puppets), best described as silhouettes. The visual style of the characters is similarly compared to that used by the 1926 film The Adventures of Prince Achmed (one of the oldest-surviving animated feature films).

The animation production style was essentially "anymation", using anything that served the purpose. Scenes featuring characters were composed out of a variety of materials, including card cut-outs which were then scanned and manipulated in Adobe Photoshop, and also various found objects. The backgrounds are actually 2D, consisting of many layers to simulate 3D. These background layers were later selectively blurred in the compositing application, to simulate distant views. Certain sequences (notably those featuring airships) are entirely computer-rendered 3D scenes using an assemblage of parts from a variety of commercial 3D models of vehicles and ships in the Despona 3DS Max series, textured and animated using 3DS Max. The final product consists of all of these elements brought together using the compositing program Combustion (software). Combustion added the particle effects for smoke and similar, while cloud layers in certain scenes were rendered using Maya.

== Awards ==
=== Nominations ===
- Academy Award for Best Animated Short Film, 2006.

=== Wins ===
- Australian Film Institute Awards, best short animation, outstanding achievement in craft in a non-feature, Production Design,
- 2005 IF Awards. Winner, Digital Pictures IF Award for Best Animation
- Flickerfest 14th International Short Film Festival 2005Yoram Gross Best Animation Award Audioloc Sound Design Award for Best Achievement in Sound
- The 29th Annecy International Animated Film Festival, France 2005 – Le Cristal d’Annecy – Grand Prix Court Métrage
- Worldwide Short Film Festival, Toronto, Canada 2005 – The C.O.R.E. Digital Pictures Award for Best Animated Short Film
- Dendy Awards for Australian Short Film, Sydney 2005 – The 2005 Yoram Gross Best Animation Award
- Sicaf Film Festival, KOREA 2005 – Special Jury Prize
- Dragon Con –Sci Fi USA, 2005 – First Place Animated Fantasy and Science Fiction: Best of Fest award, Best Animated Short.
- Palm Springs International Short Film Festival, USA, 2005 – Runner up Jury Award
- Valladolid International Film Festival, 2005 – 50th Anniversary Prize
- ATOM Award, Melbourne 2005 – Best Short Animation

=== Festival Selections ===
- Fantoche International Animation Festival, Baden, Switzerland
- Feile Bochan, Kilkenny Ireland
- Ottawa International Animation Festival '05, Canada
- Animafest Zagreb, Croatia
- Athens International Film Festival, Greece
- Revelation Perth International Film Festival 2005
- Melbourne International Film Festival 2005
- 14th Brisbane International Film Festival 2005
- Edinburgh International Film Festival, UK 2005
- Imago 2005, Portugal
- Animadrid, Spain
- Cardiff, Wales UK
- Buster, Copenhagen
- Leipzig, Germany
- Wiesbaden, Germany
- Redcat, Los Angeles
- Les Nuits Magiques, France
- L’Etrange, France
- Wessembourg, France
- Montreal, Canada
- Chang-Sha, China
- PISAF, Korea
- Asiana, Korea
- Golden Horse, Taipei
- Best of Short Films Festival in La Chiotat, France
- Cinanima, Portugal
- Horror and Fantasy Film Festival, San Sebastian, Spain
- Tollywood, Best of Annecy, Tokyo
- FIFM – Festival international de films de Montréal
- Wiesbaden International Weekend of Animation, Germany
- International Leipzig Festival for Documentary and Animated Film
- I Castelli Animati, Italy
- InDPanda International Short Film Festival, Hong Kong
