= Simon Westaway =

Australian actor (born 1958)

- Born: 22 December 1958 (age 67); Australia
- Occupation: Actor
- Years active: 1986-present
- Spouse: divorced

Simon Westaway (born 22 December 1958) is an Australian actor who has appeared in many television series, films and theatre productions.

== Education ==
Westaway studied acting with PBL Workshop and John Gauchi's Theatre Workshop.

== Career ==
Westaway has featured in numerous films and television series since the mid-1980s. His most notable roles are as Sergeant Peter 'Noddy' Faithful in the crime drama series Phoenix, and its legal drama spin-off Janus, as well as portraying Domenic "Mick" Gatto in the first season of crime series Underbelly (which won him critical acclaim) and its sequel in 2014, Fat Tony & Co.. He also narrated Seven Network reality series Surf Patrol.

He has also appeared on stage, including touring productions of The Rocky Horror Show (1987–1988) and The Man from Snowy River: Arena Spectacular (2002).

Westaway is a voiceover artist for the Seven Network. He has also provided the voiceover in television commercials such as Qantas, American Express, Aerogard and Toyota Prius, as well as the Foster's beer commercials in the US ("Foster's. Australian for beer").

He competed on Celebrity MasterChef Australia in 2009.

== Personal life ==
Westaway has three children – Jackson, Bella and Ruben.

He spent time in rehab for alcoholism and a prescription Xanax blackout, following his split and subsequent divorce from wife Diane, in 2009.

== Filmography ==
=== Television ===
Year	Title	Role	Type
1986	Prisoner	Officer Blunt	TV series, 1 episode
1989	Rafferty's Rules	Vincent Paul Vincent	TV series, 1 episode
1989	Neighbours	Kevin Harvey	TV series, 6 episodes
1989	Pugwall	Policeman #1	TV series, 3 episodes
1989	Home and Away	Sergeant Col Baker	TV series, 1 episode
1989	Mission: Impossible	Lt. Muler	TV series, 1 episode
1990	Family and Friends	Damien Chandler	TV series
1992	Cluedo	David	TV series, 1 episode
1992–93	Phoenix	Sergeant Peter 'Noddy' Faithful	TV series, 26 episodes
1993	Crocadoo	Jazz (voice)	TV series
1994	Time Trax	Buffo Francis	TV series
1994–95	Janus	Peter Faithful	TV series, 25 episodes
1995	Soldier Soldier	Major Ian McKinnon	TV series, 2 episodes
1996	Naked: Stories of Men	Father Breslin	TV series, 1 episode
1996	G.P.	Lt Colonel Brian Parsons	TV series, 1 episode
1996	Twisted Tales	John Berryman	TV series, 1 episode
1997	Fallen Angels	Eddie Hallat	TV series, 1 episode
1997	Big Sky	Luke	TV series, 1 episode
1997	Wildside	Senator Phillip Dunleavey	TV series, 2 episodes
1998	Crocadoo II	Jazz (voice)	TV series
1999	Flipper	Nick Randell	TV series, 1 episode
1999	Halifax f.p.	Jon Knight	TV series, 1 episode
1999	The Micallef Program	Detective	TV series, 1 episode
1999–2000	BeastMaster	Baha	TV series, 4 episodes
2000	Tales of the South Seas		Miniseries, 1 episode
2002	Stingers	Leo Goldman	TV series, 1 episode
2003	White Collar Blue	Jack McCabe	TV series, 1 episode
2004	Blue Heelers	Abe Burrows	TV series, 2 episodes
2004	Through My Eyes	Dennis Barritt	Miniseries, 2 episodes
2005	Blue Water High	Mr Sanderson	TV series, 2 episodes
2005	The Alice	Snr Sgt Milroy	Miniseries, 1 episode
2007	Surf Patrol	Narrator	TV series
2008	Underbelly	Mick Gatto	TV series, season 1, 9 episodes
2008	The Singing Bee	Contestant	TV series, 1 episode
2009	Celebrity MasterChef	Himself	TV series, 10 episodes
2014	Rake	Gordon Martin	TV series, 1 episode
2014	Fat Tony & Co.	Mick Gatto	Miniseries, 7 episodes
2014	Old School	Dave Granger	Miniseries, 1 episodes
2015	Squirrel Boys	The Coach	Web series

=== Film ===
Year	Title	Role	Type
1987	Slate, Wyn & Me	Policeman	Feature film
1987	Running from the Guns (aka Free Enterprise)	Motorcycle Cop	Feature film
1987	Feathers	TV Race Car Announcer	
1988	Tender Hooks	Motorcycle Cop	Feature film
1993	No Worries	Auctioneer	Film
1995	Sahara	Marty Williams	TV movie
1996	The Thorn Birds: The Missing Years	Luke O'Neill	TV movie
1996	Hart to Hart: Harts in High Season	Billy	TV movie
1996	Film Noir	Voice	Short film
1997	Fable	Henry Fable	TV movie
1998	When Love Comes	Eddie	Feature film
1998	Babe: Pig in the City	Detective	Feature film
1998	The Thin Red Line	First Scout	Feature film
1998	Justice	Det Sgt Alan Blake	Feature film
1999	Alien Cargo	Adam Iberra, SSS17 First Watch	TV movie
1999	Komodo	Bracken	Film
1999	Chameleon II: Death Match	Reynard Dulac	TV movie
2001	The Finder (aka Trackdown)	Les Kearney	TV movie
2002	Australian Rules	Bob Black	Feature film
2001	Tempe Tip	Vladimir	Feature film
2003	The Man from Snowy River: Arena Spectacular	Dan Mulligan	TV movie
2003	Temptation	Bob	TV movie
2004	Small Claims	Detective Inspector Ray Vaughn	TV movie
2005	Cable	Bruno	TV movie
2005	The Great Raid		Film
2006	Happy Feet	Live action cast	Feature film
2015	Manny Lewis	Joel Hillman	Feature film

== Stage ==
Year	Title	Role	Venue / Co.
1982	West Side Story	Tony	Whitehorse Musical Theatre
1985	The Best Little Whorehouse in Texas		Deakin University, Melbourne with Whitehorse Musical Theatre
1987	Foreskin's Lament	Foreskin	Universal Theatre, Melbourne
1987–88	The Rocky Horror Show	FranknFurter / Brad	Princess Theatre, Melbourne, Lyric Theatre, Brisbane, Theatre Royal Sydney, Her Majesty's Theatre, Sydney, Comedy Theatre, Melbourne, Perth Entertainment Centre, Seagulls, Tweed Heads, Brisbane Riverstage, Parramatta Cultural Centre, Newcastle Civic Theatre, Canberra Theatre, Wellington, Auckland, Palmerstone North, Christchurch, Dunedin, New Zealand
1989	Bad Boy Johnny and the Prophets of Doom	Pope Liberty III	Church Theatre, Melbourne with Prophet Productions
1993	The Official Tribute to the Blues Brothers Show	Elwood Blues	Metro Theatre, Sydney with Paul Dainty Productions
1994	Villain of Flowers		NIDA Parade Theatre, Sydney
2000	A Streetcar Named Desire		Sydney Opera House
2002	The Man From Snowy River Arena Spectacular	Dan Mulligan, the leading hand	Sydney Entertainment Centre, Brisbane Entertainment Centre, Rod Laver Arena, Melbourne, Burswood Dome, Perth, Adelaide Entertainment Centre

== Awards ==
Year	Work	Award	Category	Result
2002	Australia Day	Film Critics Circle of Australia Awards	Best Supporting Actor – Male	Won
