= Return to Snowy River =

The Man from Snowy River II / Return to Snowy River

Soundtrack album by Bruce Rowland
- Released: April 1988
- Recorded: 1988
- Genre: Soundtrack
- Label: Varese Sarabande
- Producer: Bruce Rowland

The Man from Snowy River II is the original motion picture soundtrack from the 1988 film The Man from Snowy River II. The album was released in Australia in April 1988.

The film and album were released in USA under the title Return to Snowy River.

Bruce Rowland composed the music for the film, and also conducted the orchestra during the recording of the album. He also wrote the music for the score of the 1982 film The Man from Snowy River.

== Tracks ==
1. "Long Way from Home"
2. "Man from Snowy River II"
3. "By the Fireside"
4. "Eureka Creek"
5. "Back to the Mountains"
6. "Skill at Arms"
7. "Jessica's Sonata #2"
8. "Pageant at Harrison's"
9. "Gathered to the Fray"
10. "Alone in the Mountains"
11. "Farewell to an Old Friend" — (Now Do We Fight Them)
12. "You Should be Free"
13. "Closing Credits"

== Charts ==
Chart (1988)	Peak position
Australia (Kent Music Report)	82

== Award ==
- The 1989 APRA Award, was awarded to Bruce Rowland for the Best Film soundtrack score, for The Man from Snowy River II (Return to Snowy River).
