= Troy Honeysett =

Australian actor

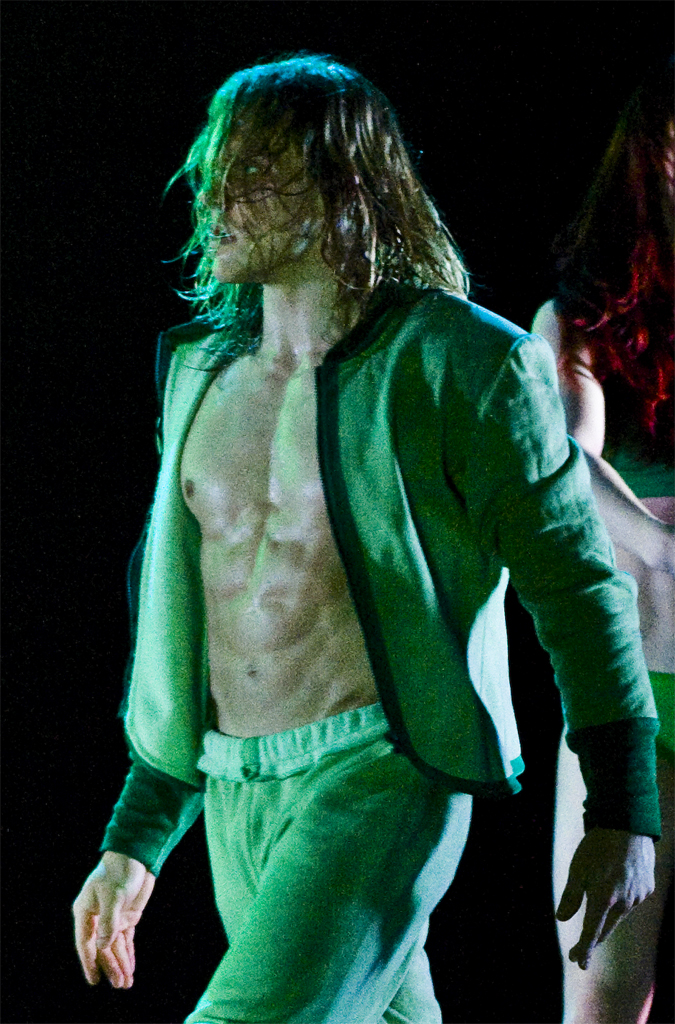
- Honeysett in the premiere of Garry Stewart's contemporary re-working of classical ballet Giselle.
- Born: Troy James Honeysett; Alice Springs, Northern Territory
- Education: National Institute of Dramatic Art, Te Whaea
- Occupation: Actor
- Years active: 2014–present 2006–2010 (dancer)
- Website: www.troyhoneysett.com

Troy Honeysett is an Australian actor. He is also known for his time with Australian Dance Theatre and his "ferocious athleticism" on stage. Honeysett is a graduate from the National Institute of Dramatic Art, Sydney, Australia, and Te Whaea, Wellington, New Zealand. He is the face of Builders Academy Australia.

== Background ==
Honeysett made his American feature film debut in Universal Pictures' Hard Target 2 (released Sept 2016). His most recent performance is in Australian cinema release The Combination: Redemption (premiered Feb 2019). He has been credited in productions by Australian companies Pinchgut Opera, Theatre of Image, Bell Shakespeare, Opera Australia; and various other screen roles.

Honeysett was born in Alice Springs, Northern Territory and began classical ballet later in life, having proven himself a proficient gymnast and international martial arts competitor. He became a Principal dancer with Australian Dance Theatre (ADT), and during this time toured full-length contemporary dance works throughout Europe, The United States and Japan. Honeysett left ADT to attend the National Institute of Dramatic Art (NIDA) to pursue acting.

Honeysett plays action-hero "Bob the Builder" in an advertising campaign from Builders Academy Australia – the first television release was banned from free-to-air broadcast for "glamourising unsafe workplace behaviour".

Other screen appearances include ABC Television's Artscape documentary series – Artists at Work and The Making of Collision Course. He appeared in Seasons Two and Three of reality-television series So You Think You Can Dance Australia, with Guest Performances and Choreography by Australian Dance Theatre. Honeysett was first seen on screen in The Man from Snowy River: Arena Spectacular (film).

Honeysett is a stage and screen movement director, stunt advisor, coach, educator, and dramaturg.

== Filmography ==
Key
†	Indicates a film that has not yet released
‡	Indicates a documentary

=== Films ===
Year	Title	Role	Notes
2021	Hostile Forces †	Kane	Feature film
2021	Lickerish †	Tyler	Feature film
2021	Deliverance †	Noah	Short film
2021	Temple Of Zoom	C*nt	Short film
2020	Bluey	Jeff	Short film
2020	Dark Art †	Detective West	Short film
2020	Stay Home Stay Safe	P.R.	Short film
2019	Phantastes †	Sir Percival	Short film
2019	Lost Boy	Joe	Short film
2018	Spirit Spinner †	Mark	Short film
2018	Courtside Confessional	Wiley	Short film
2017	The Combination: Redemption	Rick	Feature film
2016	Hard Target 2	Jonny Sutherland	Feature film
2016	Superman Meets Batman	Clark Kent / Superman	Mini-movie
2016	Saralysis †	Sack	Feature film
2016	Tackling Romeo †	Coop Dorelli	Feature film
2015	Spear	White Man	Feature film
2015	The Mistress of the Forest	Hogart	Short film
2011	Collision Course	Himself	Art film
2003	The Man from Snowy River: Arena Spectacular	Acrobat	TV film

=== Television ===
Year	Title	Role	Network	Notes
2023	Class Of '07	The Match (Gareth)	Amazon Prime	TV series
2022	Foxtel: All In One Place	Lestat	Foxtel	Commercial
2015	Builders Academy: A Legend Is Born	Bob	Foxtel	Commercial
2014	Builders Academy: We Can Fix It	Bob	Foxtel	Commercial
2014	The 14th Annual Helpmann Awards	Presenter	Arena	Live ceremony
2011	The Making of Collision Course ‡	Himself	ABC	Documentary
2010	Artscape: Artists at Work ‡	Himself	ABC	Documentary
2009–2010	So You Think You Can Dance Australia	Himself	Network Ten	3 episodes: (season 3, episode 23) "Grand Finale"; (season 2, episode 17) "Top 10: Performances"; (season 2, episode 16) "Top 12: Results"
2009	The 7PM Project	Julian Schiller	Network Ten	1 episode: (season 1, episode 25) Stunt double (segment)
2008	Don't Try This at Home	Himself	Free-to-air	Commercial

=== Theatre ===
Year	Title	Role	Venue	Production Co.	Notes
2023	Chorus!	movement director	Sydney Opera House	Opera Australia	Also dramaturg
2022–2023	The Phantom Of The Opera	movement coach	Sydney Opera House; Arts Centre Melbourne	Opera Australia	Also revival fight choreographer
2022	Lohengrin	movement director	Arts Centre Melbourne	Opera Australia	Also revival fight choreographer
2021	Tosca	movement coach	Sydney Opera House	Opera Australia	Also revival fight choreographer
2021	Bluebeard's Castle	movement director	Sydney Opera House	Opera Australia	Also revival fight choreographer
2020	Attila	movement director	Sydney Opera House	Opera Australia	Also revival fight choreographer
2020	Don Giovanni	movement coach	Sydney Opera House	Opera Australia	Also revival fight choreographer
2020	Carmen	movement coach	Sydney Opera House	Opera Australia	Also revival fight choreographer
2019	Twelfth Night	movement director	Reg Grundy Theatre	NIDA	Directed by Jim Sharman
2017	L'incoronazione di Poppea	Nero's mercenary	City Recital Hall	Pinchgut Opera	Also assistant director
2015–2017	NIDA Diploma of Musical Theatre Showcase	Himself	Parade Playhouse	NIDA	Director
2014–2015	Monkey	Boatman	Sydney Opera House; Canberra Theatre; Brisbane Powerhouse; Riverside Theatre	Bell Shakespeare; Theatre of Image	Also martial arts tricker
2014	Der Rauchfangkehrer	Peter	City Recital Hall	Pinchgut Opera	Also assistant director, choreographer
2014	Australian Dance Awards	Himself	Joan Sutherland Theatre	Australian Dance Council	Live VO announcer
2009	Australian Dance Awards	Himself	State Theatre	Australian Dance Council	Guest performer

=== Dance ===
Year	Title	Role	Venue	Notes
2011	NSW Business Chamber Awards	Himself	Sydney Town Hall	Guest soloist
2010	Be Your Self	Principal	Her Majesty's Theatre	Australian premiere
2009	Slack --New Breed	Principal	Sydney Opera House	w/ Sydney Dance Company
2009	Zero-sum	Principal	WOMADelaide	World premiere
2008–2009	Giselle (G)	Principal	(33 venues): Le Grand T, Nantes, FR; Théâtre de Saint-Quentin-en-Yvelines, FR; Théâtre de Nîmes, FR Le TAP, Poitiers, FR; L’apostrophe, Cergy-Pontoise, FR; Dunstan Playhouse, Adelaide, AU; Grand Théâtre de Luxembourg, LU; Espace des Arts, Chalon-sur-Saône, FR; Château Rouge, Annemasse, FR; Théâtre de la Ville, Paris, FR; Southbank Centre, London, ENG; Stadsschouwburg Groningen, NL; Cultuurcentrum De Werf, Aalst, BE; Cultuurcentrum Hasselt, BE; Teatro Sociale di Trento, IT; Le Rive Gauche, Saint-Étienne-du-Rouvray, FR; Bonlieu Scène Nationale, Annecy, FR; Teatro Central, Seville, ES; Cultuurcentrum Magdalenazaal, Brugge, BE; Schouwburg Kunstmin, Dordrecht, NL; Le Toboggan, Décines-Charpieu, FR; La Rampe, Échirolles, FR; Mercat de les Flors, Barcelona, ES; Theater de Veste, Delft, NL; Stadsschouwburg De Harmonie, Leeuwarden, NL; Schouwburg Tilburg, NL; Goudse Schouwburg, Gouda, NL; Schouwburg Arnhem, NL; Theater de Vest, Alkmaar, NL; Het Zaantheater, Zaandam, NL; Parktheater Eindhoven, NL; Stadsschouwburg Utrecht, NL; Wonderland Ballroom, Adelaide, AU	(9 countries): France; Australia; Luxembourg; England; Netherlands; Belgium; Italy; Spain
2008	G'Day USA	Guest	Jazz at Lincoln Center	United States
2007	Devolution	Principal	(3 venues): Bonlieu Scène Nationale, Annecy, FR; Théâtre de la Ville, Paris, FR; Her Majesty's Theatre, Adelaide, AU	(2 countries): France; Australia
2006–2007	Held	Guest	(26 venues): Festival Theatre, Edinburgh, SCT; The Lowry, Salford, ENG; New Victoria Theatre, Woking, ENG; Hall for Cornwall, Truro, ENG; Alhambra Theatre, Bradford, ENG; Wycombe Swan, High Wycombe, ENG; Derngate Theatre, Northampton, ENG; Wales Millennium Centre, Cardiff, WAL; Theatre Royal, Glasgow, SCT; City Hall, Sheffield, ENG; Sadler's Wells Theatre, London, ENG; Stadsschouwburg Groningen, NL; Theater Castellum, Alphen aan den Rijn, NL; Schouwburg Tilburg, NL; Bonlieu Scène Nationale, Annecy, FR; La Rampe, Échirolles, FR; Festspielhaus, St. Pölten, AT; La Comète, Châlons-en-Champagne, FR; Teatro Central, Seville, ES; Château Rouge, Annemasse, FR; Théâtre des Salins, Martigues, FR; Le Parvis, Tarbes, FR; Cultuurcentrum De Warande, Turnhout, BE; Maison de la Culture, Bourges, FR; Espace Michel-Simon, Noisy-le-Grand, FR; Saitama Arts Theater, Tokyo, JP	(8 countries): Scotland; England; Wales; Netherlands; France; Austria; Spain; Belgium; Japan
2005	Kylián Suite II	Himself	Te Whaea Theatre	New Zealand
2004	Currently Under Investigation	Himself	Te Whaea Theatre	New Zealand
