= Surf Patrol =

- Created by: David Galloway; Michael Horrocks
- Presented by: Simon Westaway (S1); Naomi Robson (S2); Tom Williams (S3)
- Country of origin: Australia
- Original language: English
- No. of series: 3

Production
- Running time: 30 minutes (including commercials)
- Production company: Cornerbox Productions

Original release
- Network: Seven Network
- Release: 9 July 2007 – 2009

Surf Patrol, Australia's Lifesavers is an Australian reality television series that aired on the Seven Network. The series was produced by the Australian production company Cornerbox, the producers of Seven's other factual series The Force and Border Security: Australia's Front Line. The first season was presented by Simon Westaway, with Naomi Robson taking over for season two, and Tom Williams for series three.

The show premiered on 9 July 2007. The second season started airing from 12 May 2008, with a third aired from 14 July 2009.

== Overview ==
The show follows the work of volunteer surf lifesavers on the beaches of New South Wales, Victoria, and Queensland. It also features the work of the Sydney Westpac Life Saver Rescue Helicopter Service and Sydney's offshore rescue boats, such as the Cronulla District LifeSaver Rescue Service.

== Reception ==
=== Series One ===
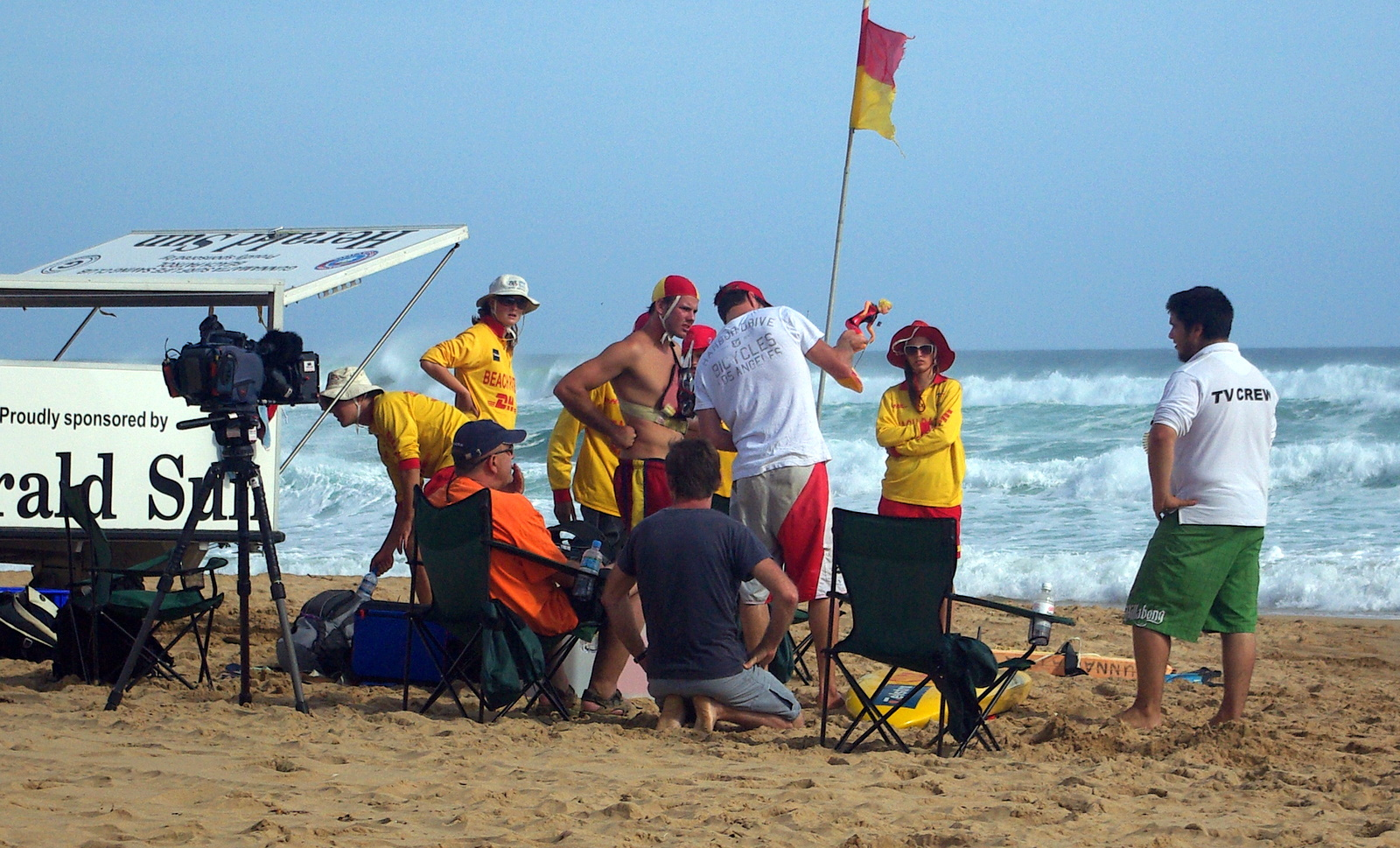
Filming for the second series at Gunnamatta Surf Beach, Victoria.

The first season, consisting of 17 episodes, began airing on 9 July 2007. The first reason of Surf Patrol was viewed by an average of 1.45 million people in Australia's mainland capital cities over the course of the series and was the highest rating program of the week on several occasions.

=== Series Two ===
Following its highly successful debut in 2007, Channel 7 and Cornerbox ordered a second season of Surf Patrol, which began filming on 22 December 2007. The second season consisted of 20 episodes, and covered more beaches than the first series.

Surf Lifesaving Australia President, Ron Rankin AM, welcomed the news of a second series and said the program was a tribute to the work of surf lifesavers across the country: "I have travelled around Australia extensively during the Year of the Surf Lifesaver and many people have told me how much they love Surf Patrol and the realistic portrayal of SLSA members," he said. "We look forward to working closely with Cornerbox and Channel 7 to ensure that the second series portrays the very best of our movement."

=== Series Three ===
Season three of Surf Patrol focused on the beaches of Queensland, primarily the Northern Gold Coast and Southport & Surfers Paradise SLSCs. Many episodes primarily feature Lifesavers Ryan Knight (Lifesaver of the Year), Kenny Lloyd (Surfers Paradise Patrol Captain) and Tom Abella (popular public figure) due to their relative popularity with viewers.

The season debuted well, attracting an audience of 1.526 million viewers.

Season	Episodes	Viewership			Ref
Season	Episodes	Viewers	Rating	Rank	Ref
One	13	1.454	10.3	No. 6	
Two	10	1.363	9.6	No. 13	
Three	8	1.415	9.7	No. 6	

== See also ==
- Bondi Rescue, a similar series
