= Edgley International =

Australian theatre and concert promotions company

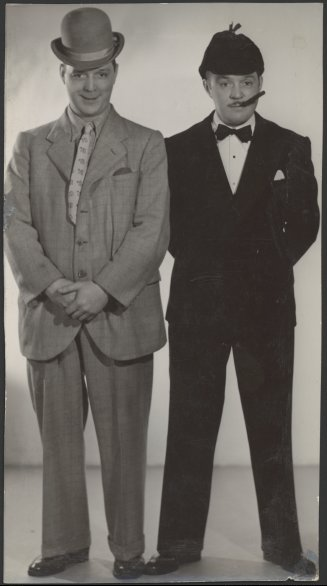
Brothers Eric Edgley and Clement Edward as duo "Edgley and Dawe" in the 1920s

Edgley International is a theatre and concert promotions company from Australia, first started in the 1930s and run by several generations.

It has also been known as Edgley & Dawe Attractions, Edgley Ventures, and Michael Edgley International. The company is noted for bringing to Australia many foreign acts not previously seen in the country, particularly dance companies and circuses from Russia.

== Origins ==
English song and dance vaudeville brothers Eric Edgley and Clement Edward were invited to Australia in 1920 by J&N Tait to appear in a production of Sinbad the Sailor at King's Theatre, Melbourne.

Born as Eric and Clem White, to musician Richard White and dancer Lizzie Warton, they changed their names in their early years to stage names, considering that "White" was uninteresting and became duo "Edgley and Dawe" The partnership later toured Australia for theatre manager J. C. Williamson and played in shows including Robinson Crusoe, Love Lies and So This Is Love. Eric married an actress Phyllis Edith Amery in 1925, in Newcastle, New South Wales and was widowed when she died during childbirth in 1930, he remarried dancer Edna Louise Luscombe in 1940 at an registrar office in England. Throughout this period he and Clem toured Australasia, the United Kingdom and South Africa, doing shows under various arrangements, and moving from performers to promoters and creating a troupe called. "The Midnight Frolics", and toured productions by Sir Benjamin Fuller and the Tivoli circuit.

In 1951 they moved to Perth, Western Australia to manage His Majesty's Theatre. They took a lease on the venue in 1954 and Clem died the following year. In 1958 the company purchased His Majesty's and undertook extensive renovation work. From the early 1960s Eric arranged tours to Australasia from Russian performing troupes including the Bolshoi Ballet, the Georgian State Dance Company and the Moscow Variety Theatre. Edgley also promoted local talent including the West Australian Ballet.

Eric died in 1967 and management of the company was taken over by his then 23-year-old son Michael. The Moscow State Circus tour in 1968 attracted an audience of 1.2 million and grossed more than $7 million. Russian ballet and theatre ensembles returned to Australia under the Edgley banner in 1970, 1976, 1982, 1985, 1987, and 1988.

== Recent years ==
Edgley now has broad interests in the film industry and venue management. Film productions include The Man From Snowy River (1982) and Phar Lap (1983).

The company has staged shows in England and the United States, as well as in Asia including Hong Kong, Singapore, Korea and Taiwan

== Notable family members ==
- Eric Edgley (1899-1967).
- Edna Edgley (1910-2000. née Luscombe). Dancer. Eric's second wife, married in 1940
- Clem Dawe. (?-1955)
- Phillip Edgley (1930-1999), Eric's son by his first marriage. Stage and television performer in Western Australia. Was an early newsreader and host of TVW's first variety show called Spotlight with Rolf Harris. Spotlight premiered on TVW's opening night on 16 October 1959.
- Michael Edgley (born 1943), entrepreneur. Son of Eric and Edna.
- Jeni Edgley, entrepreneur and author. Former wife of Michael.
- Gigi Edgley (born 1977), film and television actor. Daughter of Michael and Jeni.
