= Greg Greg =

- Town
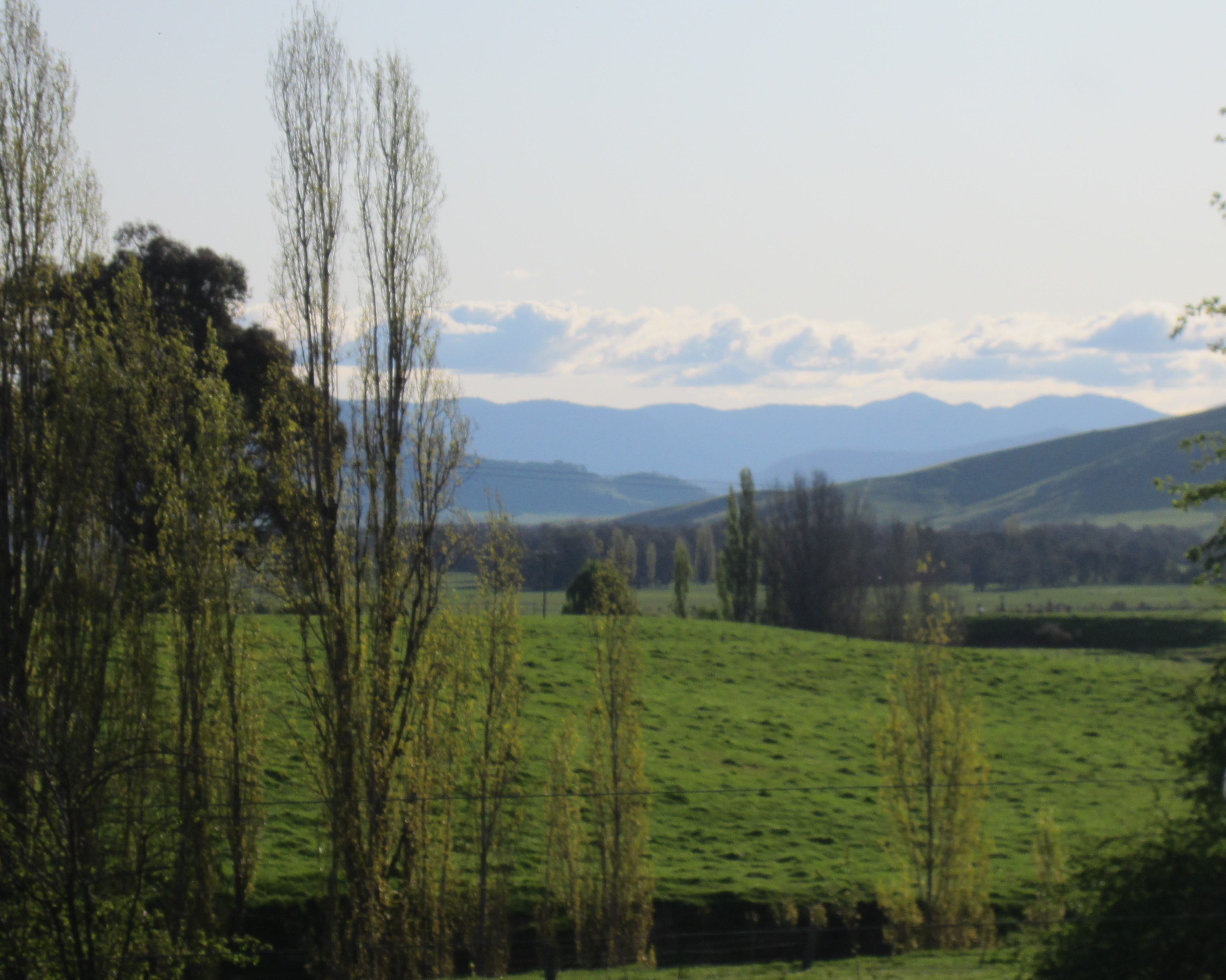

- Interactive map of Greg Greg
- Coordinates: 36°03′58.5″S 148°01′42.8″E
- Country: Australia
- State: New South Wales
- LGA: Snowy Valleys Council
- Location: 21 km (13 mi) N.E. of Corryong; 51 km (32 mi) S of Tumbarumba

Government
  - State electorate: Albury
  - Federal division: Riverina

Population
  - Total: 36 (2016 census)
- Postcode: 2642
- County: Selwyn
- Parish: Greg Greg, Welumba

Greg Greg is a rural locality in the Snowy Valleys Council local government area of New South Wales, Australia.

The locality lies on the route between Tumbarumba and Corryong. The western boundary of the locality is the Murray River (N.S.W. - Victoria border). Greg Greg lies close to where the Murray's course changes direction from generally south-to-north to generally east-to-west. Its northern boundary is the left bank of the Tooma River, and its eastern boundary is with Kosciuszko National Park. To its south lies the rural locality of Bringenbrong. The area of the locality includes the parish of the same name, but also includes part of the neighbouring parish of Welumba.

The area now known as Greg Greg lies close to the boundaries of the traditional lands of Ngarigo and Jaimathang peoples.

Greg Greg takes its name from an early grazing run operated by John Pierce (1817—1897), from at least the early 1860s. The origin of the name Greg Greg is the settlers' rendering of an Aboriginal word, said to imitate the croaking of frogs.

The area is relatively well-watered cattle grazing country. It was later subject to selection—although it seems there was some 'dummying' by the Pierce family to retain effective control of their land—and also to subdivision, resulting in the smaller landholdings still apparent today. The Pierce family and Greg Greg Station became well known for breeding of thoroughbred horses, providing horses to annual horse sales into the 1950s.

Jack Riley (1841-1914), one of the men who are held to be the inspiration for the character in the poem, The Man from Snowy River, was employed by the Pierce family of Greg Greg, although he lived for much of the time in an isolated cabin at Tom Groggin, where the Pierces had a grazing lease. It is known that the poet, A. B. 'Banjo' Paterson, had met Riley.

There is no bridge across the Murray at Greg Greg—the nearest are upstream at Towong and downstream at Tintaldra—but the old fording location known as the 'Lighthouse Crossing', lies immediately south of the locality. This old crossing was the scene of many accidental deaths and near misses, before the construction of the bridge at Towong. Prior to Federation, the area around the old crossing was the location of smuggling activities to evade inter-colonial customs duties and other border controls. The lands bordering the Murray were particularly affected by colonial-era customs policies.

There was a school at Greg Greg from 1881 to 1887 and again from 1950 to 1968.
