= Steve Jefferys =

Steve Jefferys (born in Australia) was the lone rider in the Sydney Olympics Opening Ceremony. He galloped into the stadium on his 7-year-old Australian Stock Horse "Ammo", which reared, and then Jefferys cracked his whip to signal the beginning of the Opening Ceremony. This was followed by the entrance of a further 120 riders (which included Steve Jefferys' wife, Sandra Langsford) and their Stock Horses.

Jefferys and "Ammo" re-created their Olympics entrance during the 2002 Australian stage production The Man from Snowy River: Arena Spectacular, which was based on Banjo Paterson's poem The Man from Snowy River. He also played the role of "The Breaker" in the show, and his wife also took part as one of the crack riders (expert riders). The Arena Spectacular was so successful that the show toured Australian capital cities twice. Jefferys, who is an expert horse whisperer, also taught this difficult art to Martin Crewes (who played the title role of "The Man" in the show). Steve Jefferys and his wife Sandra also trained their Stock Horse "Drummer" for his role of "the Colt from old Regret". Jefferys' and Langsford's Border Collie dog "Jana" (whom they have also trained) was also in the show, where she had the part of Banjo Paterson's dog.

Jefferys and his Stock Horses "Ammo" and "Drummer", as well as "Jana" the Border Collie, have also taken part in other equestrian events, including "Equitana 2002" in Brisbane, Queensland. Australia,

Jefferys and Langsford have a riding school, where they train horses and teach horse riding, and also teach people how to care for their horses. Jefferys also lectures at universities on animal behaviour, and has spoken at conferences, as well as holding horse clinics.

== Other appearances ==
Steve Jefferys appeared, with his horse "Ammo", on "Weekend Today" on the Nine Network in Australia on Saturday, 9 September 2010, celebrating ten years since the 2000 Summer Olympics in Sydney.
