= Bruce Rowland (composer) =

Australian composer (born 1942)

Bruce Rowland AM
- Born: Kenneth Bruce Rowland; 9 May 1942 (age 84); Melbourne, Victoria, Australia
- Occupation: Composer

Kenneth Bruce Rowland (born 9 May 1942) is an Australian composer.

== Life and career ==
Rowland received his education at Caulfield Grammar School in his hometown. He learned piano and was a keyboard player for Australian music groups and singers. He played drums on Shawn Phillips's Second Contribution album released in 1970.

Rowland is best known for having composed the soundtrack to the 1982 film The Man from Snowy River and its 1988 sequel The Man from Snowy River II (which also has the United States title Return to Snowy River and the United Kingdom title The Untamed). Both films are based on Banjo Paterson's poem "The Man from Snowy River".

His other film scores include Now and Forever (1983), Phar Lap (1983), Bushfire Moon (1987), Cheetah (1989), Weekend with Kate (1990), Gross Misconduct (1993), Andre (1994), Lightning Jack (1994), Zeus and Roxanne (1997) and the TV movie Tidal Wave: No Escape (1997). He also composed the score for the TV miniseries All the Rivers Run (1983) and its sequel (1990). Rowland composed the music to the Oscar-nominated animated short film The Mysterious Geographic Explorations of Jasper Morello (2005).

Some of his early work was in television, where he was musical director for ATV0's The Go!! Show, Fredd Bear's Breakfast-A-Go-Go and the Magic Circle Club, then Adventure Island for the Australian Broadcasting Corporation.

He composed a special Olympics version of the main theme of The Man from Snowy River for the Opening Ceremony of the 2000 Summer Olympics, as well as conducting the orchestra for the performance. He also composed special arrangements of some of his music for the 2002 musical theatre production "The Man from Snowy River: Arena Spectacular", which twice toured Australian capital cities. The original cast album of the show won the ARIA Award for Best Cast / Show Album. Rowland also composed new music for "The Australian Outback Arena Show" on Queensland's Gold Coast.

The Man From Snowy River soundtrack has featured four times in ABC Classic's annual Classic 100 Countdown, peaking at 18 in the 2025 piano countdown. This made it the highest-ranking entry by an Australian composer.

NBC Sports uses music from The Man from Snowy River soundtrack for their coverage of The Players Championship.

== Discography ==
=== Charting albums ===
List of albums, with Australian chart positions
Title	Album details	Peak chart positions
Title	Album details	AUS
Piano by Request	Released: March 1985; Format: LP; Label: Hammard (HAM097)	51

== Honours and awards ==
In the 2025 King's Birthday Honours, Rowland was appointed a Member of the Order of Australia, for significant service to music as a composer, arranger and conductor.

Awards won by Bruce Rowland:

1982

- Won the AFI Award for Best Score for The Man from Snowy River

1983

- Won the AFI Award for Best Score for Phar Lap
- Won the Penguin Award for Best Score for All the Rivers Run

1984

- Won the Australasian Performing Right Association Award for Best Score for The Man from Snowy River

1985

- Won the AFI Award for Best Score for Rebel
- Won the Australasian Performing Right Association Award for Best Score for The Man from Snowy River
- Won the Australasian Performing Right Association Award for Best Score for Phar Lap

1989

- Won the Australasian Performing Right Association Award for Best Score for The Man from Snowy River (Return to Snowy River)

2005

- Won the Australasian Performing Right Association Award for Best Score for The Mysterious Geographic Explorations of Jasper Morello
- Awarded the APRA/AGSC 'International Achievement Award'

=== ARIA Music Awards ===
The ARIA Music Awards is an annual awards ceremony held by the Australian Recording Industry Association. They commenced in 1987.

Year	Nominee / work	Award	Result	Ref.
1989	The Man from Snowy River II	Best Original Soundtrack, Cast or Show Album	Nominated	

== See also ==
- List of Caulfield Grammar School people
