= John Brady (showman) =

Australian whip cracking expert

John Brady is an Australian whip cracking expert. He has performed in leading shows, fairs and special events, as well as in many television shows and films, including being a stuntman in the Clint Eastwood film Paint Your Wagon.

In September 1974, John and Vi Brady performed at Expo '74 in Spokane, Washington, United States, "billed as Australia's stockwhip champions, [they] flicked cigarettes and handkerchiefs from each others mouths and pockets and did boomerang stunts".

Brady's television appearances include You Asked for It and It's Incredible.

In 2002 Brady performed original routines with both stockwhips and rope tricks during the musical theatre show, The Man from Snowy River: Arena Spectacular, as well as playing the character Saltbush Bill in the show.

Because of his rope tricks and whipcracking expertise, John Brady has been inducted into the Australian Stockman's Hall of Fame in Longreach, Queensland, Australia. DVDs have been released of his whip-cracking.
