= Martin Crewes =

Australian actor

Martin Crewes is an Australian stage, television and movie actor.

== Early life ==
Crewes was born in Barnet borough, London in 1968. He moved to Australia when he was 10 years of age, and attended the Western Australian Academy of Performing Arts, in Perth, Western Australia. Since graduating, Crewes has taken part in many stage plays and musical productions, both in Australia and internationally, and has also appeared in various television and movie productions.

== Career ==
Crewes' stage musical theatre roles include Lt. Joe Cable in South Pacific, Marius in Les Misérables, Claud in Hair and Chino in West Side Story. Other stage musicals include Joseph and the Amazing Technicolor Dreamcoat, The Wizard of Oz and Aspects of Love.

Crewes originated the leading role of Walter Hartright in the West End production of The Woman in White (in which he starred from September 2004 to July 2005).

For his horse riding role as Jim Ryan in the Australian musical theatre production of The Man from Snowy River: Arena Spectacular, Crewes, who could already ride, was given intensive riding lessons by expert riding teacher Steve Jefferys so that he would not require a body double for the difficult riding feats he had to accomplish in the show. Jefferys also taught Crewes the difficult art of being a horse whisperer. Horse whispering usually takes years to learn, but Crewes was able to master this difficult skill in only two weeks.

From 2011, he originated the role of Pasha/Strelnikov in the Australian premiere of Doctor Zhivago. His performance earned him a nomination for a Helpmann Award.

Following this in 2012, he performed in The Production Company's season of Chess as Frederick "Freddie" Trumper. Directed by Gale Edwards, and ran for 10 performances (as standard for The Production Company). Crewes was nominated for a Green Room Award for Actor in a Leading Role. In 2019, he played Utterson in the 25th Anniversary Concert of Jekyll & Hyde. Other roles he’s played in Australia are Sky Masterson in Guys and Dolls, Larry Murphy in Dear Evan Hansen and Monsieur Andre in The Phantom of the Opera.

Crewes' television and movie roles include Luis Amor Rodriguez in Dream Team, DOA: Dead or Alive as Guy on Boat, and a major role as Chad Kaplan in the 2002 film Resident Evil.

In the 2022 Australian film Everything in Between, Crewes portrayed David Knight, a wealthy but emotionally distant father. Critics described his performance as “likeable yet despicable”, with one review stating that “the most specific performance belongs to Crewes”.

== Awards ==
Green Room Awards

- Winner (2002) for Male Artist in a Leading Role (Claude in Hair)
- Nominee (2002) for Male Artist in a Leading Role (Jim Ryan in The Man from Snowy River: Arena Spectacular)
- Nominee (2012) for Male Artist in a Leading Role (Freddy in Chess)

Helpmann Awards

- Nominee (2002) for Best Male Actor in a Musical (Rik in Oh! What a Night)
- Nominee (2011) for Best Male Actor in a Supporting Role in a Musical (Pasha/Strelnikov in Doctor Zhivago)

== Filmography ==
Year	Title	Role	Notes
2002	Resident Evil	Chad Kaplan	
2006	DOA: Dead or Alive	Butler	
2013	Patrick	Brian Wright	
2022	Everything In Between	David Knight	
