= The Man from Snowy River (poem) =

1890 poem by Andrew Barton Paterson

- by Banjo Paterson
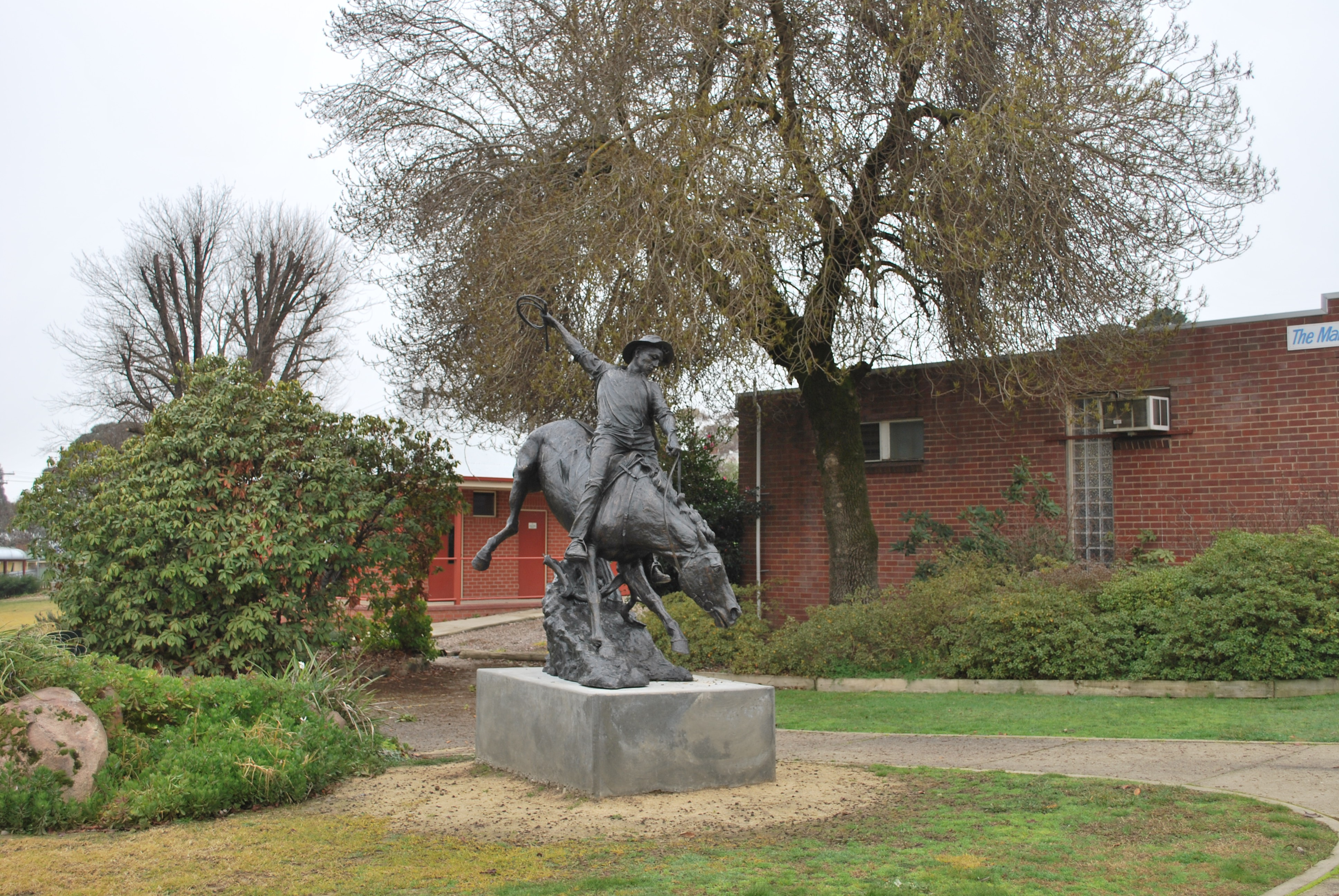
- Statue of The Man from Snowy River at Corryong, Victoria, Australia
- Written: 1890
- First published in: The Bulletin
- Country: Australia
- Language: English
- Publication date: 26 April 1890

Full text
- The Man from Snowy River at Wikisource

"The Man from Snowy River" is a poem by Australian bush poet Banjo Paterson. It was first published in The Bulletin, an Australian news magazine, on 26 April 1890, and was published by Angus & Robertson in October 1895, with other poems by Paterson, in The Man from Snowy River and Other Verses.

The poem tells the story of a horseback pursuit to recapture the colt of a prizewinning racehorse that escaped from its paddock and is living with the brumbies (wild horses) of the mountain ranges. Eventually the brumbies descend a seemingly impassable steep slope, at which point the assembled riders give up the pursuit, except the young protagonist, who spurs his "pony" (small horse) down the "terrible descent" and catches the mob.

Two characters mentioned in the early part of the poem are featured in previous Paterson poems: "Clancy of the Overflow" and Harrison from "Old Pardon, Son of Reprieve".

== Setting of the poem ==
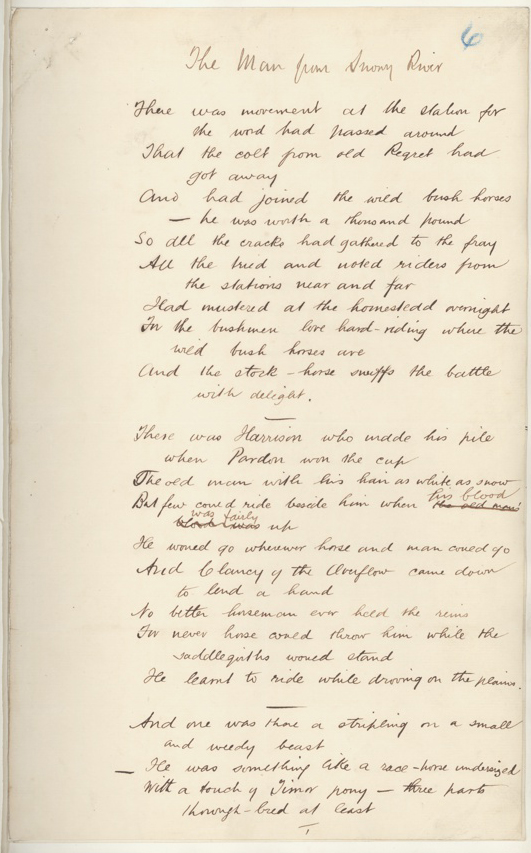
The Man from Snowy River and other verses, manuscript, ca. 1895

It is recorded in the selected works of "Banjo" Paterson that the location of the ride fictionalised in the poem was in the region of today's Burrinjuck Dam, north-west of Canberra in the Australian Capital Territory. Paterson had helped round up brumbies as a child and later owned property in this region.

The Snowy River, from where "the Man" comes, has its headwaters in the Snowy Mountains, the highest section of the Great Dividing Range near the easternmost part of the border between New South Wales and Victoria. The ride does not take place in the Snowy River region because, within the poem, Clancy describes to the other men the country from where "the man from Snowy River" comes.

== "The Man" ==
Charlie McKeahnie's grave in Old Adaminaby cemetery

Corryong, a small town on the western side of the range, claims stockman Jack Riley (1841–1914) as the inspiration for the character, and like many other towns in the region uses the image of the character as part of the marketing to tourists. Riley was a hermit stockman employed by John Pierce of Greg Greg Station at Corryong to run cattle at "Tom Groggin", 60 km upriver from Khancoban, New South Wales. Paterson is said (by Corryong legend) to have met Riley on at least two occasions.

The inspiration for "The Man" was claimed by Banjo himself to be not one person, but a number of people, one of whom was Owen Cummins. Cummins was born to Michael Cummins of Duniry, Ireland. The family emigrated to Melbourne to settle in Dargo. Owen was well known for being a great horseman. He worked around the area before making his way up to Wave Hill, Northern Territory, where a monument has been erected to reflect his role in inspiring the poem. Owen Cummins is also recognised in the Stockmen's Hall of Fame in Longreach.

There is a possibility that another exceptional and fearless rider, Charlie McKeahnie, was the inspiration for the poem. In 1885, when McKeahnie was only 17 years of age, he performed a dangerous riding feat in the Snowy River region. Historian Neville Locker supports this theory, adding that a prior poem had been written about McKeahnie by bush poet Barcroft Boake and that the story had been recounted by a Mrs Hassle to a crowd that included Paterson. Locker also offers as evidence a letter by McKeahnie's sister that discusses the ride and Paterson's hearing of the ride. McKeahnie was killed in a riding accident near Bredbo in 1895 and is buried in the Old Adaminaby cemetery, on the shores of Lake Eucumbene.

Other historians point to the claims of Jim Troy, who died aged 33. Troy was related by marriage to Thomas McNamara, said to be “Clancy”, subject of another famous Paterson poem, Clancy of the Overflow. “Clancy” also had a second claim to absolute knowledge of the “man” having been included in the Snowy River poem as “no better horseman ever held the reins”. McNamara gave an interview to the Brisbane Courier-Mail newspaper in 1938 in which he recalled the actual details of that terrific chase in the hills beside Wagga Wagga.

Another possibility is J. R. Battye from Walgett. In a report in the papers in 1877, likely to have been seen by Paterson, Battye while Brumby shooting spurs his horse on when it slips its bridle and, powerless over the animal's actions trusts it to follow the wild ones, which it does, catching them after several miles through country thickly timbered and full of holes.

== Historical context of the poem ==
The poem was written at a time in the 1880s and 1890s when Australia was developing a distinct identity as a nation. Though Australia was still a set of self-governing colonies under the final authority of Britain, and had not yet trod the path of nationhood, there was a distinct feeling that Australians needed to be united and become as one. Australians from all walks of life, be they from the country or the city (see "Clancy of the Overflow"), looked to the bush for their mythology and heroic characters. They saw in the Man from Snowy River a hero whose bravery, adaptability and risk-taking could epitomise a new nation in the south. This new nation emerged as the Commonwealth of Australia in 1901.

== Currency commemoration and tribute ==
A. B. "Banjo" Paterson and "The Man From Snowy River" poem are commemorated on the Australian 10 dollar note . The full text of the poem is printed several times in microprint as one of the note's security devices.

== Recordings of the poem ==
- In 1972, Slim Dusty recorded the poem with new music, to call attention to the "old bush ballads".
- A reading of the poem by actor and narrator Leonard Teale was named to the National Film and Sound Archive's registry of culturally significant audio recordings, Sounds of Australia, in 2019.
- Steve Bisley narrated the poem, in his role as Banjo Paterson, during the re-enactment of the poem in the 2002 musical theatre production The Man from Snowy River: Arena Spectacular.
- Jack Thompson has released recordings of a number of Banjo Paterson poems including "The Man from Snowy River" and "Clancy of the Overflow" on the album The Bush Poems of A.B. (Banjo) Paterson.
- The Australian folk band Wallis and Matilda set the poem to music on their album Pioneers.
- The Concert Band of the 2nd Military District (Australia) made a recording with the poem narrated by Tim Elliott, accompanied by an arrangement of the music from the 1982 film. (Reference YPRX2097)

== Adaptations of the poem ==
Three films, a television series and an arena spectacular musical have been based on the poem.

Films:

- The Man from Snowy River (1920 film)– a silent black and white film
  - starring Cyril Mackay as "Jim Conroy" (the Man) and Stella Southern as "Kitty Carewe"
- The Man from Snowy River (1982 film)– film
  - starring Tom Burlinson as "Jim Craig" (the Man) and Sigrid Thornton as "Jessica Harrison"
- The Man from Snowy River II – the 1988 sequel to the 1982 film
  - (US title: Return to Snowy River / UK title: The Untamed)
  - starring Tom Burlinson as "Jim Craig" (the Man) and Sigrid Thornton as "Jessica Harrison"

Television:

- The Man from Snowy River (TV series) — (set 25 years after the famous ride)
  - starring Andrew Clarke as "Matt McGregor" (the Man)

Stage musical:

- The Man from Snowy River: Arena Spectacular
  - starring Martin Crewes as "Jim Ryan" (the Man) and Georgie Parker as "Kate Conroy"

== See also ==
- 1890 in Australian literature
- Adaminaby
- Snowy River
