= David Atkins =

Australian dancer and choreographer (born 1955)

David Atkins OAM
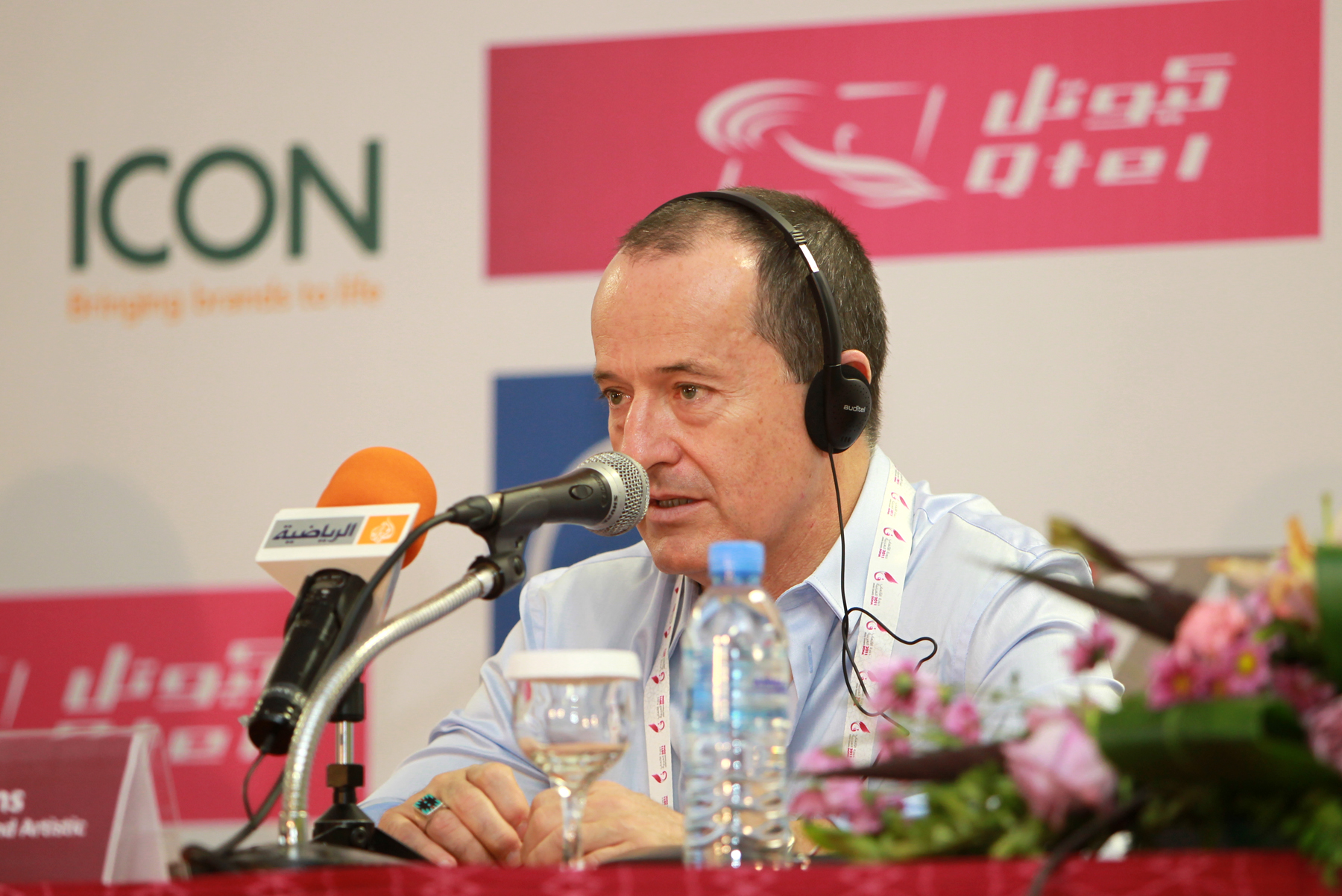
- Atkins at the 2011 Doha Arab Games
- Born: 12 December 1955 (age 70); Sydney, Australia
- Occupations: Executive producer and artistic director; dancer; choreographer
- Years active: 1967–present
- Children: 2

David Atkins (born 12 December 1955) is an Australian dancer, choreographer, music-theatre director and producer.

== Career ==
=== Stage and television ===
Atkins began his performance career aged 12 with a role in the musical Mame. As an adult performer, as well as performing in shows such as A Chorus Line and The Pirates of Penzance, he created and performed in his own works Dancin' Man and Dynamite.

=== World events ===
Atkins has directed and produced major live events in various countries. These include opening, victory and closing ceremonies of the 2010 Winter Olympics held in Vancouver, British Columbia, Canada.

== Honours and awards ==
Atkins was recognised in the 2003 Queen's Birthday Honours with a Medal of the Order of Australia (OAM) for his contribution to the Australian entertainment industry. In 2010, the Australian Event Awards presented him with a Lifetime Achievement Award for his enduring contributions to the Australian events industry.

=== Mo Awards ===
The Australian Entertainment Mo Awards (commonly known informally as the Mo Awards), were annual Australian entertainment industry awards. They recognise achievements in live entertainment in Australia from 1975 to 2016. David Atkins won nine awards in that time.

Year	Nominee / work	Award	Result (wins only)
1991	David Atkins	Outstanding Contribution to Musical Theatre	Won
1992	David Atkins	Musical Theatre Male Performer of the Year	Won
1992	David Atkins	Musical Theatre Performer of the Year	Won
1994	David Atkins	Musical Theatre Male Performer of the Year	Won
1994	David Atkins	Australian Showbusiness Ambassador	Won
1995	David Atkins	Outstanding Contribution to Musical Theatre	Won
1995	David Atkins	Australian Showbusiness Ambassador	Won
1997	David Atkins	Outstanding Contribution to Musical Theatre	Won
1998	David Atkins	Outstanding Contribution to Musical Theatre	Won
