= The Man from Snowy River II =

1988 Australian drama film

- Theatrical release poster
- Directed by: Geoff Burrowes
- Written by: Banjo Paterson (poem); Geoff Burrowes (story); John Dixon
- Produced by: Geoff Burrowes
- Starring: Tom Burlinson; Sigrid Thornton; Brian Dennehy; Nicholas Eadie; Bryan Marshall; Mark Hembrow
- Cinematography: Keith Wagstaff
- Edited by: Gary Woodyard
- Music by: Bruce Rowland
- Production companies: Burrowes Film Group; The Hoyts Group; Silver Screen Partners III
- Distributed by: Hoyts Distribution (Australia); Walt Disney Pictures (through Buena Vista Pictures Distribution, International)
- Release dates: 24 March 1988 (Australia); 15 April 1988 (United States)
- Running time: 110 minutes
- Country: Australia
- Language: English
- Budget: A$8.7 million
- Box office: $13,687,027

The Man from Snowy River II is a 1988 Australian drama film, the sequel to the 1982 film The Man from Snowy River, which was distributed by 20th Century Fox.

It was released in the United States by Buena Vista Pictures Distribution under its Walt Disney Pictures label as Return to Snowy River, and in the United Kingdom as The Untamed.

Reprising their roles from the first film were Tom Burlinson as Jim Craig and Sigrid Thornton as Jessica Harrison, while Brian Dennehy appeared as Harrison instead of Kirk Douglas.

== Plot ==
Some years after his dangerous ride down the steep mountain to capture the Brumby mob and regain the colt, Jim Craig, now with a large herd of mountain-bred horses of his own, returns to take up with his woman, Jessica Harrison. She is still smitten with him, but opposition from her father, Harrison, is as resolute as ever. Further, she also has a rich would-be suitor, Alistair Patton (son of the banker from whom Harrison is seeking a large loan), endeavouring to court her. Before he returns from Harrison's property to his home, Jim meets an army officer seeking quality horses for the remount service on a regular basis.

As he realizes Jessica's affections remain for Jim, and that she doesn't "give a damn" about him, Patton jealously and maliciously recruits a gang to steal Jim's horses. Jim gives chase and in so doing again rides his horse down the steep mountainside. Patton shoots at him; the horse is killed and Jim is injured but manages to recover and resume the pursuit. Jim had earlier let the wild stallion which led the Brumbies loose into the wild again; in a twist of fate, the stallion shows itself from the wild at this crucial moment, and Jim finally trains the horse that has been the enigma of the entire district for decades. As Jim breaks him in and learns to ride him, they become friends, and together they catch up to Patton and his gang.

Harrison has also relented during this time, and he eventually joins with Jim and his friends to hunt down Patton and his gang. Jim wins a man-to-man duel with Patton, and Harrison gives his blessing for Jim to marry Jessica.

== Cast ==
- Tom Burlinson as Jim Craig
- Sigrid Thornton as Jessica Harrison
- Brian Dennehy as Harrison
- Nicholas Eadie as Alistair Patton Jr.
- Mark Hembrow as Seb
- Bryan Marshall as Hawker
- Rhys McConnochie as Alistair Patton Sr.
- Peter Cummins as Jake
- Cornelia Frances as Mrs. Darcy
- Tony Barry as Jacko
- Wynn Roberts as Priest
- Alec Wilson as Patton's Croney
- Peter Browne as Reilly
- Alan Hopgood as Simmons
- Mark Pennell as Collins

== Production ==
Geoff Burrowes, who produced the first movie, decided to direct as he felt he would clash with any other director because he felt so strongly about the material.

A pregnant mare, which was part of the horse mob, injured a leg during the making of the movie and was put down. A government inquiry later found, contrary to allegations by the RSPCA, that the horse was put down in the most humane way possible under the circumstances.

== Award and nominations ==
- Won 1989 APRA Award for Best Original Music Score (soundtrack title Return to Snowy River) — (awarded to Bruce Rowland)
- Nominated for 1988 AFI Award for Best Achievement in Sound
- Nominated for 1989 Motion Picture Sound Editors Golden Reel Award for Best Sound Editing – Sound Effects

== Box office ==
The Man from Snowy River II grossed $7,415,000 at the box office in Australia.

== See also ==
- List of films about horses
