= The Man from Snowy River (1982 film) =

1982 Australian Western and drama film

- Theatrical release poster
- Directed by: George T. Miller
- Screenplay by: John Dixon
- Story by: Fred "Cul" Cullen
- Based on: "The Man from Snowy River" by Banjo Paterson
- Produced by: Geoff Burrowes; Michael Edgley; Simon Wincer
- Starring: Kirk Douglas; Jack Thompson; Tom Burlinson; Sigrid Thornton; Lorraine Bayly
- Cinematography: Keith Wagstaff
- Edited by: Adrian Carr
- Music by: Bruce Rowland
- Production companies: Cambridge Productions; Edgley International; Snowy River Investment Pty. Ltd.
- Distributed by: Hoyts Distribution (Australia); 20th Century Fox (International)
- Release dates: 25 March 1982 (Australia); 5 November 1982 (United States)
- Running time: 104 minutes
- Country: Australia
- Language: English
- Budget: $3 million or $3.5 million
- Box office: $50 million (worldwide)

The Man from Snowy River is a 1982 Australian Western drama film by George T. Miller, based on the Banjo Paterson poem "The Man from Snowy River." The film stars Kirk Douglas in dual roles as brothers Harrison (a character who appeared frequently in Paterson's poems) and Spur, Jack Thompson as Clancy, Tom Burlinson as Jim Craig, Sigrid Thornton as Harrison's daughter Jessica, Terence Donovan as Jim's father, Henry Craig, and Chris Haywood as Curly. Both Burlinson and Thornton later reprised their roles in the 1988 sequel, The Man from Snowy River II, which was distributed by Walt Disney Pictures.

== Plot ==
When Jim Craig and his father Henry are discussing their finances, a herd of wild horses called the Brumby mob passes by, and Henry wants to shoot the black stallion leader, but Jim convinces his father to capture and sell them. Jim and Henry are making a yard to trap the mob when the horses reappear and trample through the area. In the mayhem, the Craigs' horse runs off with the mob and Henry is accidentally killed. Before Jim can inherit the station, a group of mountain men tell him that he must first earn the right – and to do so he must go to the lowlands and work. Henry's old friend, Spur, a one-legged miner, gives Jim a horse. Jim then gets a job at a station owned by Harrison, Spur's brother, on a recommendation by Harrison's friend, Andrew Patterson (a character based on the poet A. B. (Banjo) Paterson). Meanwhile, Clancy appears at Spur's mine and the two discuss their pasts and futures. Clancy goes to Harrison's station to lead a cattle muster. At dinner, Harrison tells Clancy that "he has no brother" when referring to Spur.

Harrison organises a round-up of his cattle, but Jim is not allowed to go. While the others are gone, Harrison's daughter Jessica asks Jim to help her break in a prize colt. The mob appears again, and Jim unsuccessfully gives chase to the valuable horse. When Harrison returns, he sends Jim to bring back 20 strays. Later, Harrison learns of Jim's actions and tells Jessica that Jim will be fired and that she will be sent to a women's college. Impulsively, she rides off into the mountains where she is caught in a storm.

Spur, meanwhile, finally strikes a large gold deposit. Jim finds Jessica's horse and rescues her. She tells him that he's going to be fired, but he still leaves to return the cattle. Jessica is surprised to meet Spur, her paternal uncle, whom she had never been told about. She is also confused when Spur mistakes her for her dead mother and refuses to tell her anything about his past. After returning, Jessica learns that Spur and Harrison both fell in love with her mother, Matilda. Matilda declared that the first to make his fortune would be her husband. Spur went looking for gold, while Harrison bet his life savings on a horse race. Harrison became rich overnight when the horse he bet on won. Having made his fortune, Harrison wed Matilda, but she died while delivering Jessica. Harrison is grateful to Jim for returning his daughter, but he becomes angry when Jim says he loves her. As Jim leaves, a prized colt is let loose by a farmhand named Curly in the hope that Jim will be blamed.

Later, while camping out, Spur tells Jim that he will inherit his father's share of the mine. Clancy joins them and informs them of the colt, but Jim refuses to retrieve the animal. Meanwhile, Harrison offers a reward of £100, attracting riders and fortune-hunters from every station in the area. Clancy does eventually show, accompanied by Jim, whom Harrison finally allows to join the hunt. Several riders have accidents in pursuit and even Clancy is unable to contain the Brumby mob. The riders give up when the mob descends a seemingly impassable grade. However, Jim goes forward and returns the horses to Harrison's farm. Harrison offers him the reward but he refuses. Having cleared his name, Jim would like to return someday for the horses and, looking at Jessica, "anything else that's mine." He rides back up to the mountain country, knowing that he has earned his right to live there.

== Cast ==
- Tom Burlinson as Jim Craig
- Sigrid Thornton as Jessica Harrison
- Terence Donovan as Henry Craig
- Kirk Douglas as Harrison / Spur
- Tommy Dysart as Mountain Man
- Bruce Kerr as Man in Street
- David Bradshaw as Banjo Paterson
- Jack Thompson as Clancy
- Tony Bonner as Kane
- June Jago as Mrs. Bailey
- Chris Haywood as Curly
- Kristopher Steele as Moss
- Gus Mercurio as Frew
- Howard Eynon as Shorry
- Lorraine Bayly as Rosemary Hume

== Production ==
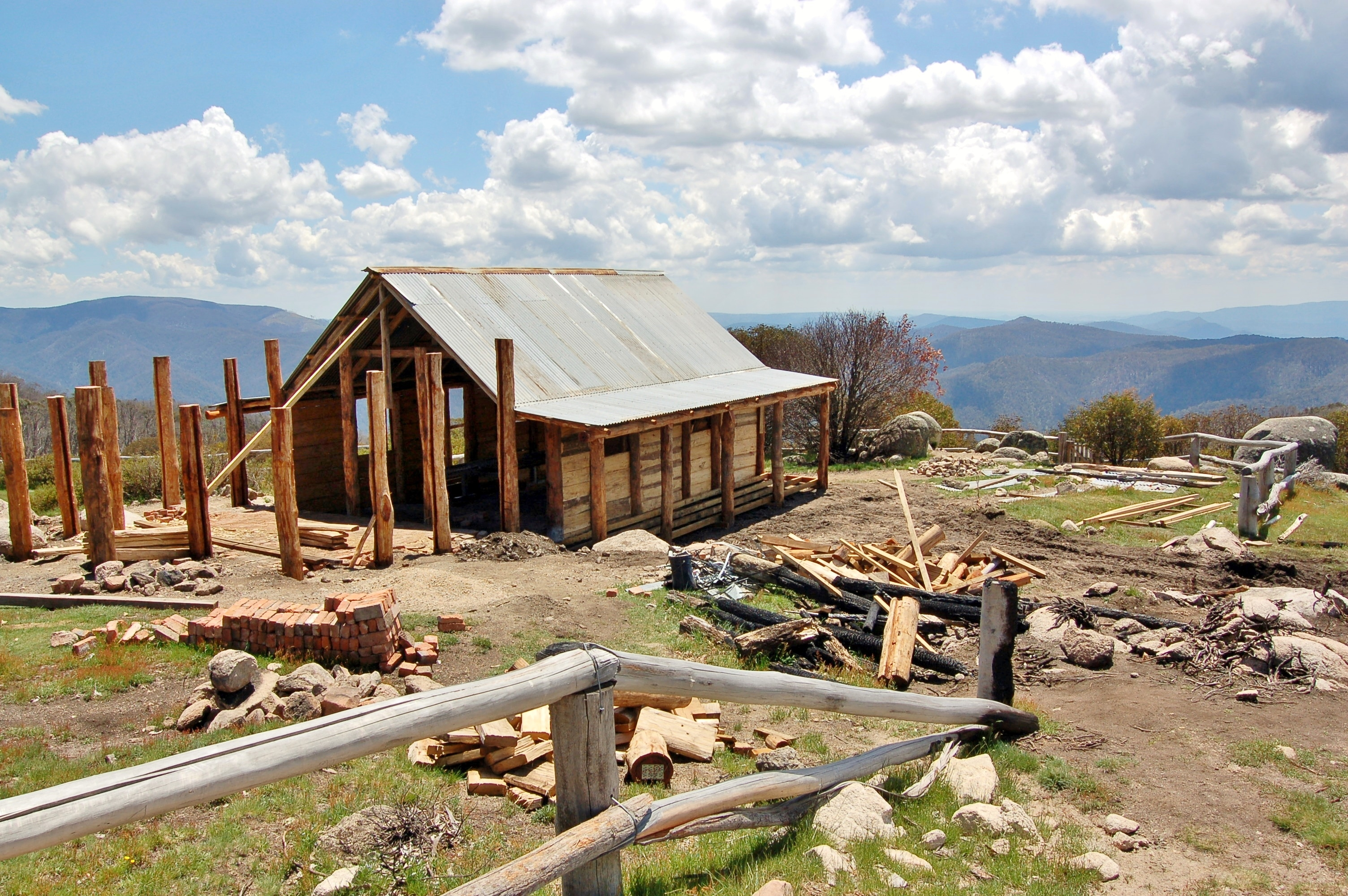
Craig's Hut undergoing reconstruction in 2007

According to Geoff Burrowes, the idea to make the film came at a dinner party when someone suggested the poem would make a good movie. Burrowes developed a treatment with George Miller then hired John Dixon to write a screenplay. All three men had worked together in television; another former TV colleague, Simon Wincer, became involved as executive producer with Michael Edgley and succeeded in raising the budget.

The screenplay contains numerous references to Banjo Paterson, aside from using his poem "The Man from Snowy River" as the source material and his inclusion as a character in the film. For example, the numerous references to the late Matilda are likely a reference to the song "Waltzing Matilda", which was written by Paterson. In addition, the melody for "Waltzing Matilda" can be heard near the end of the film. A Bible passage from Genesis 30:27, which talks about cattle, goats, and sheep is read aloud in a scene in the middle of the film.

Jack Thompson has a relatively brief role despite his prominent billing.

The film was not shot in the actual Snowy Mountains but in the Victorian High Country near Mansfield, Victoria, where Burrowes' wife's family had lived for several generations, which was logistically easier. Burt Lancaster and Robert Mitchum were considered for the dual role of Harrison and Spur before Kirk Douglas was cast in the roles.

Tom Burlinson had ridden a horse only a few times before being cast in the film. He was taught to ride by mountain cattleman Charlie Lovick, who owned the buckskin horse Burlinson rode in the film. Gerald Egan doubled for Burlinson for several riding shots in the film, including the jump into the "terrible descent". Other moments in the film such as when Jim is thrown over the fence into the path of the brumbies were performed by professional stunt men. Nevertheless, Burlinson did much more of the action riding in the film than an actor normally would, including all the profile shots of the downhill ride.

== Soundtrack ==
Bruce Rowland composed the music for both the film and the sequel. Clancy's theme is a derivative of the convict ballad Moreton Bay.

== Reception ==
The film "was released to a fair degree of critical acclaim" and "moviegoers found it to be a likable and highly entertaining piece of filmmaking that made no effort to hide its Australian roots, despite the presence of American star Kirk Douglas in one of the principal roles." The film has a rating of 77% on film review aggregator Rotten Tomatoes from 13 reviews. One reviewer commented: "The Australian film industry has been responsible for many decent films for decades (and some utter crap, of course), but the percentage with international appeal is quite small. That is changing, and it is films such as The Man from Snowy River that have ensured ongoing interest.

Sandra Hall in The Bulletin said, "the horses are fine. Magnified by the wide screen, their every pant and whinny dignified by Dolby Sound, the horses deliver the goods. As the production notes say, the problem in making Banjo Paterson’s poem into a film was that while he provided a wonderful climax, he didn’t leave much in the way of exposition." Roger Ebert said, "It's corny in places, and kind of dumb, and its subplot about the romance between the boy and the girl seems plundered from some long-shelved Roddy McDowall script. But The Man from Snowy River has good qualities, too, including some great aerial photography of thundering herds of horses."

== Box office ==
The Man from Snowy River was a box-office success, grossing A$17,228,160 at the box office in Australia – the highest-grossing Australian film until Crocodile Dundee was released four years later. It was briefly the highest-grossing film in Australia until surpassed by E.T. the Extra-Terrestrial.

The film grossed A$33 million outside Australia for a worldwide total of A$50 million, including US$20,659,423 from the United States and Canada.

Kirk Douglas sued Burrowes for a share of the profits.

== Awards and nominations ==
- Won 1982 AFI Award for Best Original Music Score—(awarded to Bruce Rowland)
- Won 1982 Montreal World Film Festival Award for Most Popular Film—(awarded to George T. Miller)
- Won 1984 APRA Award for Best Original Music Score—(awarded to Bruce Rowland)
- Nominated for 1982 AFI Award for Best Achievement in Sound
- Nominated for 1983 Golden Globe Award for Best Foreign Film Australia

== Legacy ==
As indicated by its box-office takings, The Man from Snowy River gained a very large audience, popularising the story and Banjo Paterson's poem. Since 1995 the story has been re-enacted at The Man from Snowy River Bush Festival in Corryong, Victoria. Jack Thompson who played Clancy in the film has released recordings of a number of Banjo Paterson poems, including Clancy of the Overflow and The Man from Snowy River on the album The Bush Poems of A.B. (Banjo) Paterson.

The Craigs' Hut building was a permanent fixture created for the film. Located in Clear Hills, east of Mount Stirling, Victoria, the popular 4WD and hiking landmark was destroyed on 11 December 2006 in bushfires. The hut has been rebuilt. The film was selected for preservation as part of the National Film and Sound Archive of Australia's Kodak/Atlab Cinema Collection Restoration Project.

For the 2000 Summer Olympics, Rowland composed a special Olympics version of The Man from Snowy River "Main Title" for the Olympic Games, which were held in Sydney. The CD of the music for the Sydney Olympics includes the Bruce Rowland's special Olympic version of the main title. Rowland composed special arrangements of some of the soundtrack music for the 2002 musical version of The Man from Snowy River, The Man from Snowy River: Arena Spectacular.

== See also ==
- List of films about horses
