= Stockman (Australia) =

Livestock herder

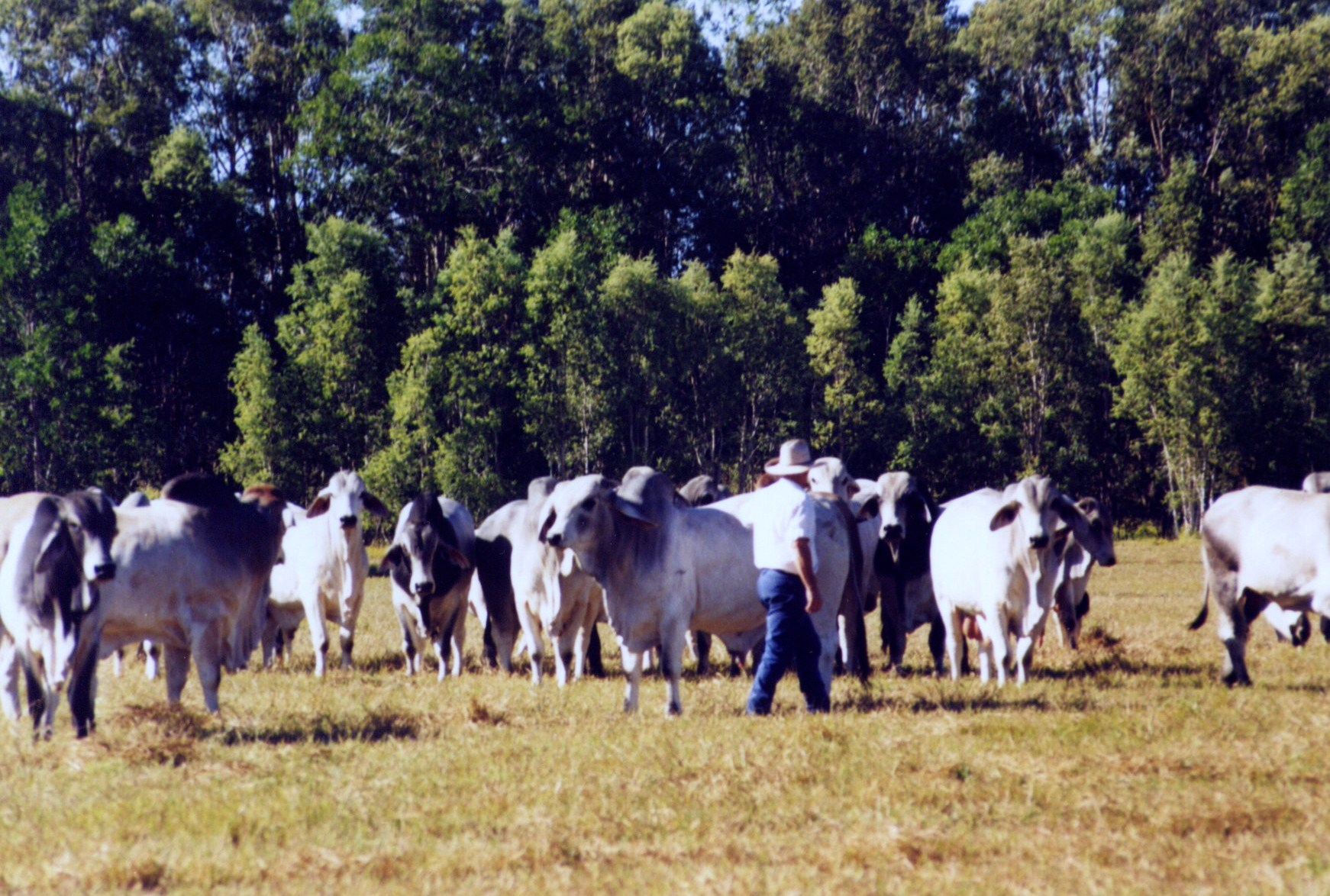
Bulls will respond well to a good stockman

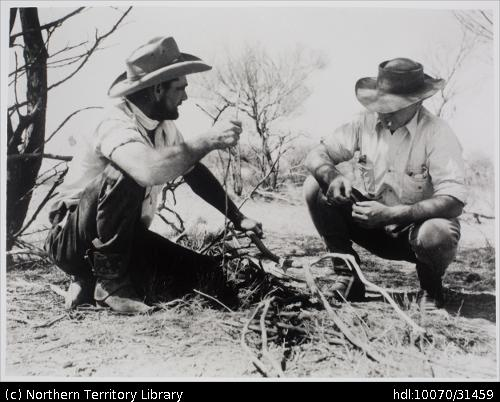
Two stockmen at Brunette Downs Station ca. 1953

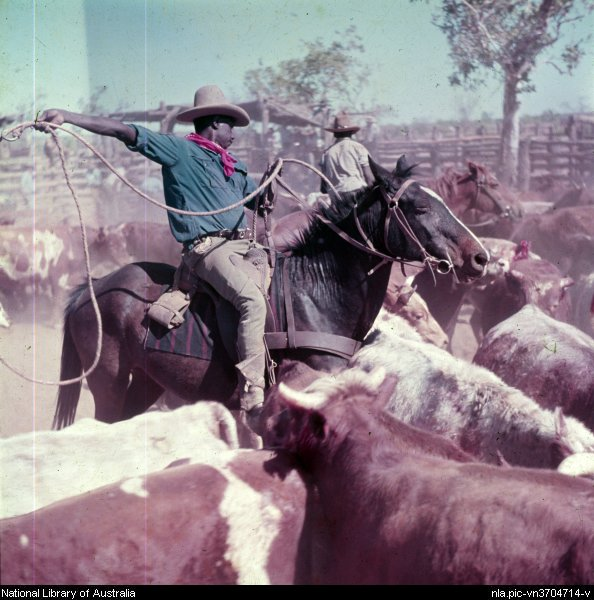
Aboriginal Australian or Torres Strait Islander stockman at Victoria River Downs Station

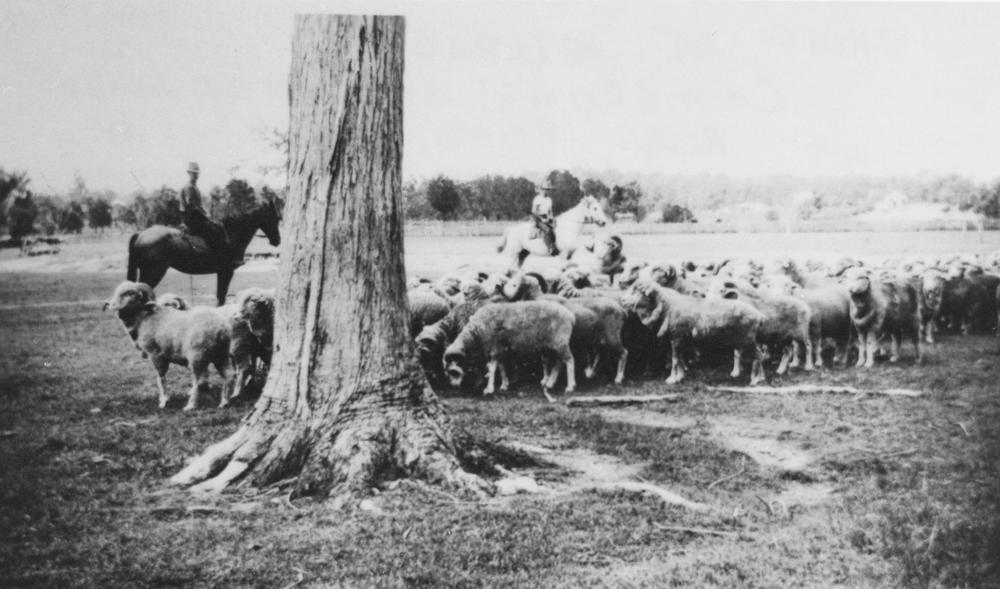
Sheep mustering at Chermside, ca. 1931

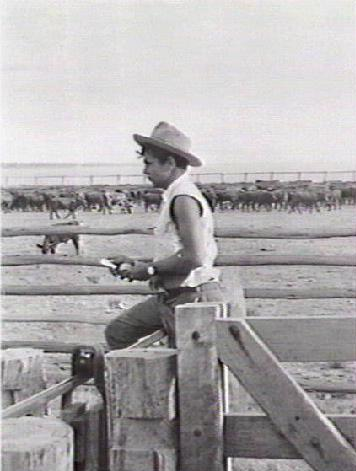
Stockman in cattle yards at Newcastle Waters Station

In Australia and New Caledonia, a stockman (plural stockmen) is a person who looks after the livestock on a station, traditionally on horse. It has a similar meaning to "cowboy". A stockman may also be employed at an abattoir, feedlot, on a livestock export ship, or with a stock and station agency.

== Associated terms ==
Stockmen who work with the cattle in the Top End are known as ringers and are often only employed for the dry season which lasts from April to October. A station hand is an employee who is involved in routine duties on a rural property or station, which may also involve caring for livestock. With pastoral properties facing dire recruitment problems as young men are lured into the booming mining industry, young women from the cities are becoming a common sight on outback stations, often attracted by the chance to work with horses. An associated occupation is that of the drover, who, like the shearer may be an itinerant worker, and is employed in tending to livestock while they are travelling on a stock route.

A station trainee is known as a jackaroo (male) or jillaroo (female).

== History ==
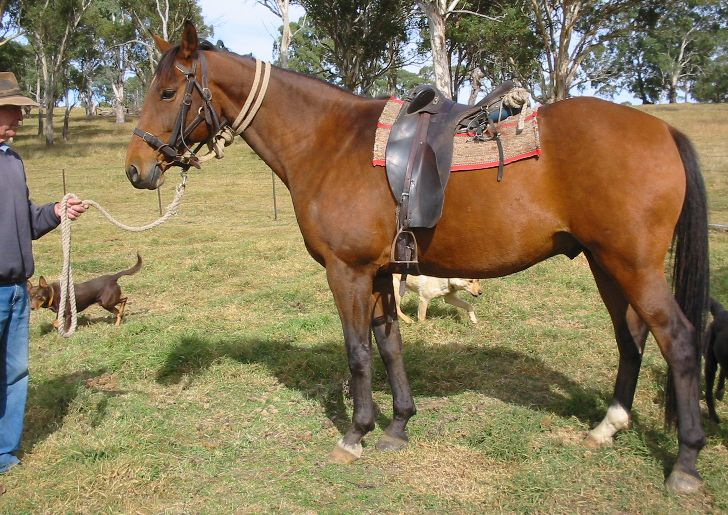
A stockman, an Australian Stock Horse and Kelpies, ready for work on Australian property.

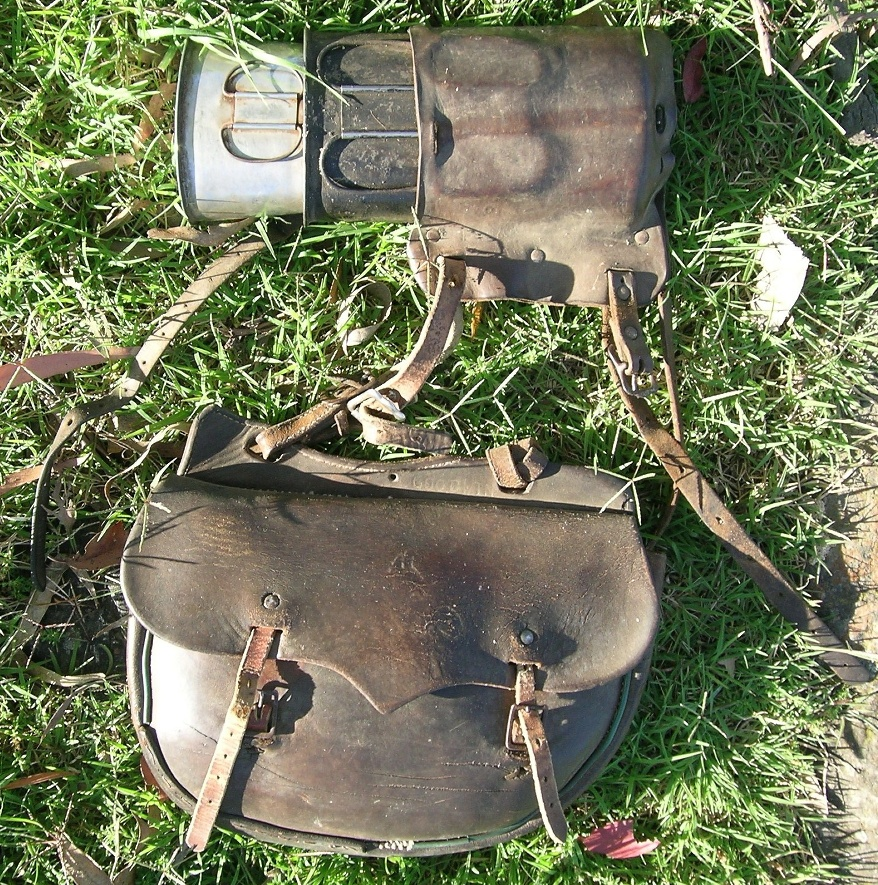
A pannikin, quart pot and saddlebag as used by stockmen to boil the billy, and carry lunch when riding.

The role of the mounted stockmen came into being early in the 19th century, after the Blue Mountains, separating the coastal plain of the Sydney region from the interior of the continent, were first crossed by Europeans in 1813. The town of Bathurst was founded shortly after, and potential farmers moved westward, and settled on the land, many of them as squatters. The rolling country, ideal for sheep and the large, often unfenced, properties necessitated the role of the shepherd to tend the flocks.

Early stockmen were few and selected owing to the high value and importance of livestock at the time. Stockmen are usually interested in animals, handle them with confidence and patience, make accurate observations about them and enjoy working outdoors.

Aboriginal Australians were good stockmen who played a large part in the successful running of many stations. With their intimate bonds to their tribal places, and local knowledge they also took considerable pride in their work. After the gold rushes white labour was expensive and difficult to retain. Aboriginal women also worked with cattle on the northern stations after this practice developed in northern Queensland during the 1880s. A Native Administration Act later stopped the employment of women in the cattle camps. Aboriginal people often received only food and clothing to retain their labour, until they began to be paid a small cash wage in the 1950s and 1960s, much less than their white counterparts. In 1966, Vincent Lingiari led Gurindji workers on the Wave Hill walk-off, a strike on the large Vesteys cattle station in the Northern Territory, which brought about wage parity two years later. In the 21st century class actions for these "stolen wages", as they have been dubbed, have taken place in Queensland, Western Australia and the NT.

In 1911, rural stockmen received only £1 to £1/5/- a week plus keep after a decision was made by the Arbitration Court. The award of 1918 increased wages by up to 50 per cent to a minimum of £2/13/-. Head stockmen received about £1 extra. Stockmen now work under a state or federal award, which is reviewed regularly.

== Role and description ==
A stockman is responsible for the care for livestock and treatment of their injuries and illnesses. This includes feeding, watering, mustering, droving, branding, castrating, ear tagging, weighing, vaccinating livestock and dealing with their predators. Stockmen need to be able to judge age by examining the dentition (teeth) of cattle, sheep and occasionally horses. Those caring for sheep will regularly have to deal with flystrike treatments, jetting animals, worm control and lamb marking. Pregnant livestock usually receive special care in late pregnancy and stockmen may have to deal with dystocia (abnormal or difficult birth or labour). A good stockman is aware of livestock behavioural characteristics, and has an awareness of flight zone distances of the livestock being handled. Apart from livestock duties a stock person will inspect, maintain and repair fences, gates and yards that have been broken by storms, fallen trees, livestock and wildlife.

A head stockman is responsible for a number of workers and a range of livestock and property operations including the supervision of operations that includes feeding, mating, managing artificial breeding and embryo transfer programs; managing vehicle and equipment maintenance; repair and maintenance of property structures; supervising and training of staff.

Mustering is done with horses or vehicles including all-terrain vehicles (ATV), and some of the large cattle stations use helicopters or light aircraft to assist in the mustering and surveillance of livestock and their watering points. Cattle mustering in the Outback and the eastern ‘Falls’ country of the Great Dividing Range often necessitates days camping out in isolated areas and sleeping in a swag (bedroll) on the ground with limited food choices. Damper is a traditional type of bread that was baked by stockmen during colonial times, or nowadays when the bread supply has been exhausted. It is made with self-raising flour, salt and water and is usually cooked in a camp oven over the embers of a fire. In these areas the days in the saddle are often very long as the cattle have to be mustered and then driven to yards or a paddock where they can be held. After the stock have been yarded they may then require drafting prior to branding, shearing or whatever procedures are required or have been planned.

The employment of mounted workers to tend livestock is necessitated in Australia by the large size of the "properties" which may be called sheep stations or cattle stations, depending upon the type of stock. In the inland regions of most states excluding Victoria and Tasmania, cattle stations may exceed 10,000 km^{2} with the largest being Anna Creek Station at 24,000 km^{2} (6,000,000 acres).

The traditional attire of a stockman or grazier is a felt Akubra hat; a double-flapped, two-pocket (for stock notebooks) cotton shirt; a plaited Kangaroo leather belt carrying a stockman's pocket knife in a pouch; light coloured, stockman cut, moleskin trousers with brown elastic side boots. The moleskin trousers have now largely been replaced by jeans. The plaited belt is often replaced by a working stockman or ringer with a belt known as a Queensland Utility Strap which can be used as a belt, neck strap, lunch-time hobble or a tie for a "micky". This attire is still used in Australian Stock Horse competitions. Pocket knives may be used to castrate and/or earmark an animal, to bang cattle tails or in an emergency to cut free an animal entangled in a rope or horse tack. Specially designed and cut for riding, oilskin Driza-Bone coats are used during wet weather. The horse typically wears a ringhead bridle, a saddle cloth, a leather Australian stock saddle, which may be equipped with a breastplate in steep country, and saddlebag and quart-pot.

== Changing times ==
Stockmen traditionally ride horses, use working dogs and a stockwhip for stock work and mustering, but motorised vehicles are increasingly used. Sometimes the vehicles that are used are four-wheel drive (4WD) "paddock-bashers", which are often old unregistered utilities. These vehicles may also be modified by removing the top and fitting roll and bull bars for bull or buffalo catching.

Some stations are now making changes for the employment of women by building female living quarters and installing hydraulic cattle crushes etc.

Transportable steel yards are now often carried on a truck to an area where stock-work can be completed without having to drive stock long distances to permanent yards. Stockmen and their horses can be unloaded at these yards and then the cattle can be branded and also transported from these yards if required. Lambs are also often marked in temporary yards as a means of reducing infection.

== Sports ==
A number of equestrian sports are particularly associated with stockmen. These include campdrafting, team penning, tentpegging and polocrosse, as well as working dog trials. The sports are played in local and state competitions and are often a feature of agricultural shows such as the Sydney Royal Easter Show. Stockman challenges are also gaining in popularity across the eastern states of Australia. In this event competitors show their skills by whipcracking, packing a packhorse (to be led around a course), bareback obstacle course, cross country, shoeing and stock handling competing in a single Australian Stock Saddle. The best will compete in a final with a brumby catch and a second final section of a stock saddle buckjump ride where they have to mark out carrying a stockwhip, or a timed obstacle event.

== Cultural depictions of stockmen ==
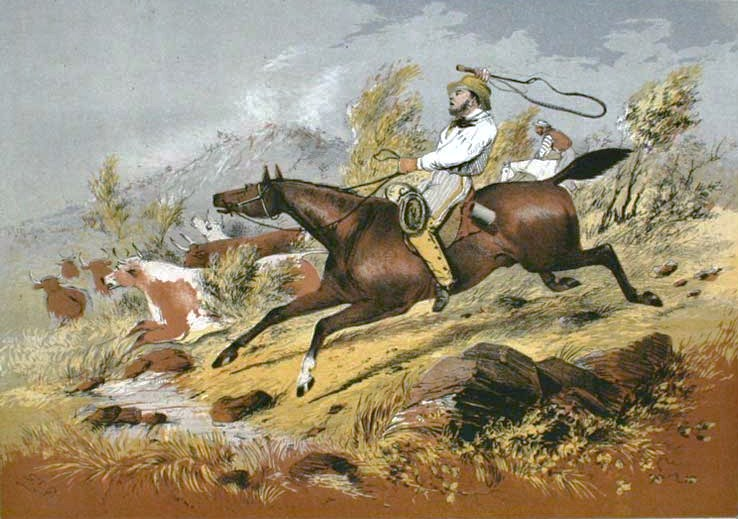
The Stockman by S.T. Gill (1818-1880)

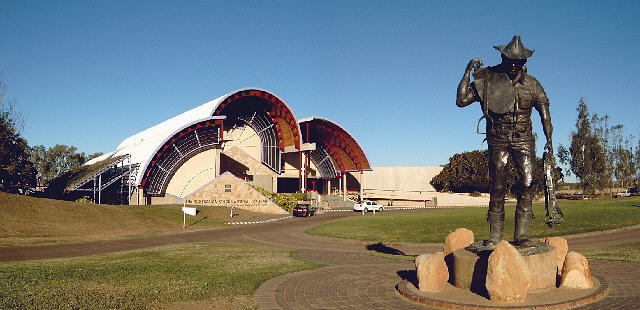
The Australian Stockman's Hall of Fame is a museum in Longreach, Australia.

Country music singer-songwriter, Slim Dusty, sang about The Ringer from the Top End.

The role of the stockmen has often been celebrated in various media, with the stockman being generally more highly renowned for his ability to bring down a bullock than an outlaw and for sharp wit rather than sharp shooting.

Two well-known songs commemorate the death of a stockman, the anonymous "Wrap me up with my stockwhip and blanket" and Rolf Harris's "Tie Me Kangaroo Down, Sport".

Through the 19th and early 20th centuries the writing of balladic poetry was a favoured form of literary expression, and the public recitation of such pieces remains a feature of Australian folk festivals. The majority of the most popular ballads deal with rural subject and many are specifically about stockmen. These works include Adam Lindsay Gordon's Bush Ballads and Galloping Rhymes which includes "The Sick Stockrider", and, most famously, Banjo Paterson's epic poem The Man from Snowy River.

"The Man from Snowy River" was to become the source of three movies, one in 1920, and another in 1982 to be followed by a sequel. A TV series followed called Banjo Paterson's The Man from Snowy River.

In 2002 the story was shown as live musical theatre called The Man from Snowy River: Arena Spectacular. The inspiration for this musical performance came from the Opening Ceremony of the 2000 Summer Olympics in Sydney, when the performance opened with 121 stockmen and women riding Australian Stock Horses in a tribute to the Australian pastoral heritage and the importance of the stock horse in Australia's heritage. The pastoral tribute took place to music written by Bruce Rowland, who composed a special Olympics version of the main theme for the 1982 movie "The Man from Snowy River". David Atkins and Ignatius Jones, who were the artistic creators of the opening ceremony of the 2000 Summer Olympics in Sydney, were also the co-creators of the musical, The Man from Snowy River: Arena Spectacular.

A further tribute to the stockman derives from the fact that for a number of years the promotions of the Sydney Royal Easter Show have referred to it as "The Great Australian Muster".

In Longreach, Queensland, a museum and memorial called the Australian Stockman's Hall of Fame was established to pay tribute to the pioneers of the Australian outback.

== Famous stockmen ==
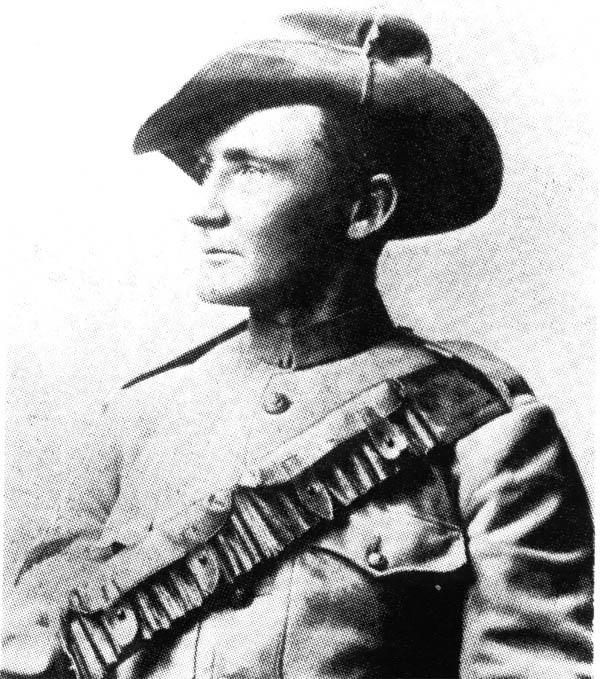
Harry 'Breaker' Harbord Morant

- Nathaniel Buchanan (1826–1901)
- Owen Cummins (1874–1953)
- Big John Dodo (c1910–2003)
- Ben Hall (1837–65)
- Sidney Kidman (1857–1935)
- William Henry Ogilvie (1869–1963)
- Vincent Lingiari (c1908–88)
- James Alpin McPherson (1842–95)
- Breaker Morant (1864–1902)
- William Shadforth (1912–2000)
- Ronnie Wavehill (c1936–2020)

== See also ==
- Cowboy
- Animal husbandry
- Drover (Australian)
- Stockman (disambiguation)
