= Stock route =

Authorised route for moving livestock

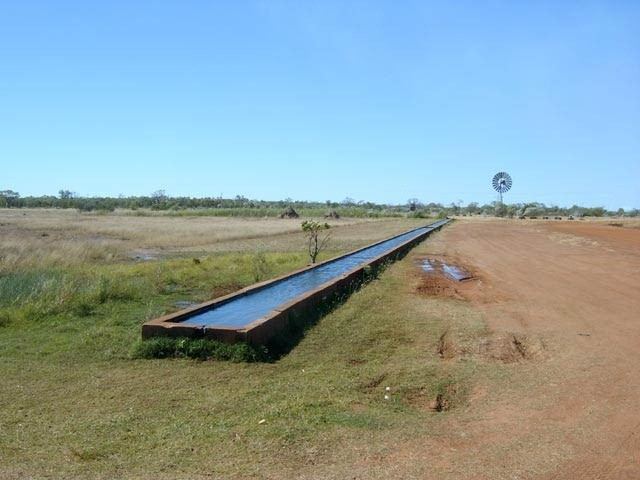
A cattle trough and windmill on a Travelling Stock Route

A stock route, also known as travelling stock route (TSR), is an authorised thoroughfare for the walking of domestic livestock such as sheep or cattle from one location to another in Australia. The stock routes across the country are colloquially known as The Long Paddock or Long Paddock.

A travelling stock route may often be distinguished from an ordinary country road by the fact that the grassy verges on either side of the road are very much wider and the property fences being set back much further from the roadside than is usul, or open stretches of unfenced land. The reason for this is so that the livestock may feed on the vegetation that grows on the verges as they travel, especially in times of drought.

== Usage ==
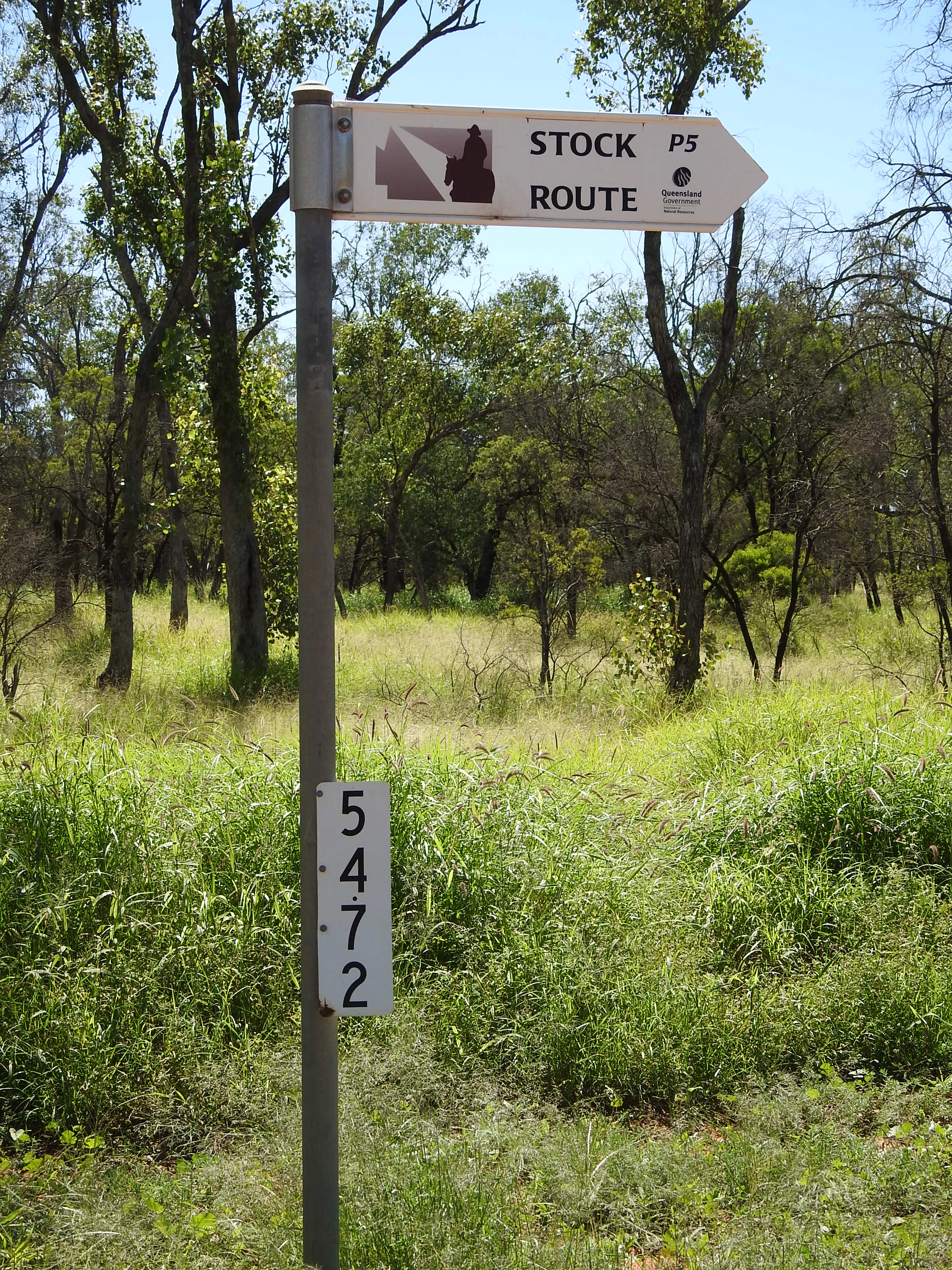
Stock route sign, Barwon Highway, Weengallon, Goondiwindi region, Queensland (2021).

By law, the travelling stock must travel "six miles a day" (approximately 10 kilometres per day). This is to avoid all the roadside grass from being cleared in a particular area by an individual mob. Bores, equipped with windmills and troughs, may also be located at regular intervals to provide water in regions where there are no other reliable water sources. A Travelling Stock Reserve is a fenced paddock set aside at strategic distances to allow overnight watering and camping of stock. Reserves may also be located on many roadways that are not the typical wide TSRs.

The travelling stock are driven by a drover and stockmen using Australian Stock Horses or vehicles. Other working animals include working dogs such as Kelpies, or their crosses which have been bred for working sheep and cattle. The stockman may also be accompanied by a packhorse,carrying supplies and equipment, or a wagon with supplies might follow the stock. More recently ,travelling stock has been accompanied by four-wheel drive vehicles and mobile homes.

The purpose of "droving" livestock on such a journey might be to move the stock to different pastures. It was also the only way that most livestock producers had of getting their product to the markets of the towns and cities. The beef cattle were transported to a rail siding or abattoirs "on the hoof". The rigors of the journey, the availability of feed and water, and the reliability of those "droving" the stock were all factors in the condition of the livestock when it was slaughtered.

== History ==
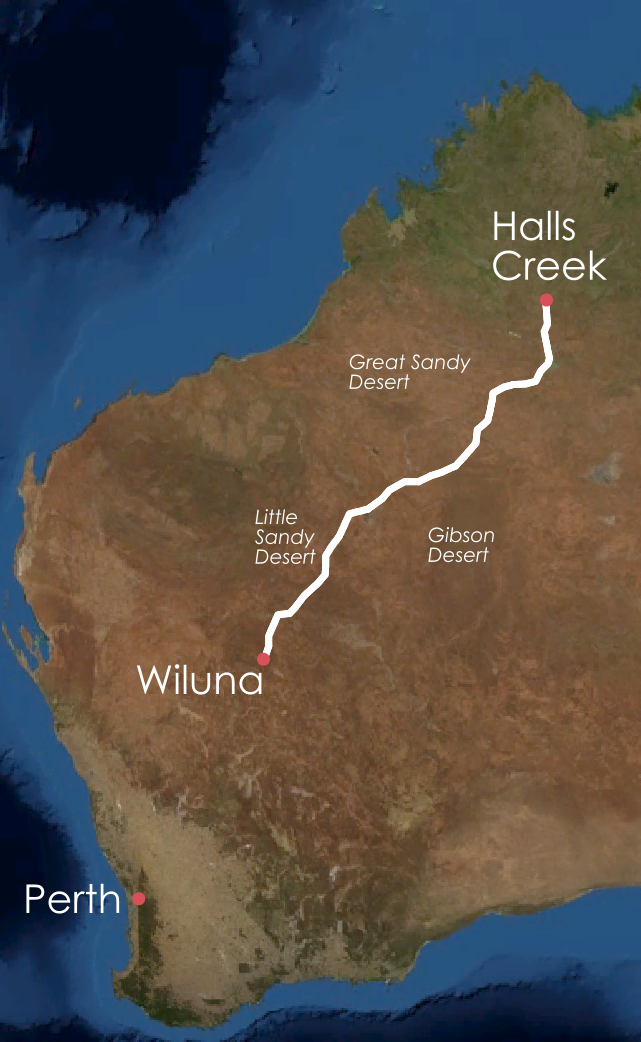
Canning Stock Route in Western Australia.

An early stock route, the Snowy TSR, was pioneered during the drought of 1828, when the supply of water and fodder failed around Lake George (New South Wales), near Canberra. The local Aboriginals, realising the plight of the stock, led the stock and their owners into the country now known as Berridale.

Colonial explorers and overlanders pioneered many of the present-day stock routes along corridors that followed river systems, indigenous trade routes, and trails. Before the railways were extended, cattle were often driven up to 3,220 kilometres (2,000 mi) on the main stock routes. These early drovers sometimes had to contend with crocodile-infested rivers, droughts, dust storms, floods, poisonous plants and hostile Aboriginals. These established routes were recognised and dedicated as roads between the 1860s and 1890s. From the early 1900s the state Governments established a program to develop stock route water facilities throughout the stock route network. Most stock routes now have designated watering points, each located the distance of away from the otherrivingay apart.

With the establishment of railways in country areas from the 1880s onwards, livestock usually reached the major destinations in cattle wagons. There were stock-yards and livestock ramps at nearly all rural railway stations to facilitate this transportation, meaning that it was only necessary to drove stock to the nearest rail transport depot. Travelling stock routes and reserves have generally been administered by Rural Lands Protection Boards since 1902. There are about 600,000 hectares of travelling stock reserves in NSW and 2.6 million hectares running for 72,000 kilometres across Queensland.

Between 1906 and 1910 Alfred Canning opened up the Canning Stock Route, one of the most famous overland routes in the world.

During World War II good highways were constructed in the Northern Territory where the railway had not been extended. After the war the road transport of cattle proved very successful with trucks carrying 80 head of fat cattle on each trip. Droving though, was continued until well into the 1950s , s these units required sealed roads. From about 1980 the road transport of livestock by road trains became increasingly common and has virtually replaced the transport of stock either by foot or by rail.

But the days of the travelling stock route are not past. In times of extreme drought, when paddocks lack feed and/or water, stockowners have been forced to reduce their livestock numbers radically or take the remaining beasts to travel their six miles a day, along the stock routes, surviving on the roadside grass. Uses of Travelling Stock Reserves include emergency refuge during floods and drought, as well as some local agistment. Today, TSRs are valued as corridors for native vegetation ecosystems and providing a habitat for flora and fauna.

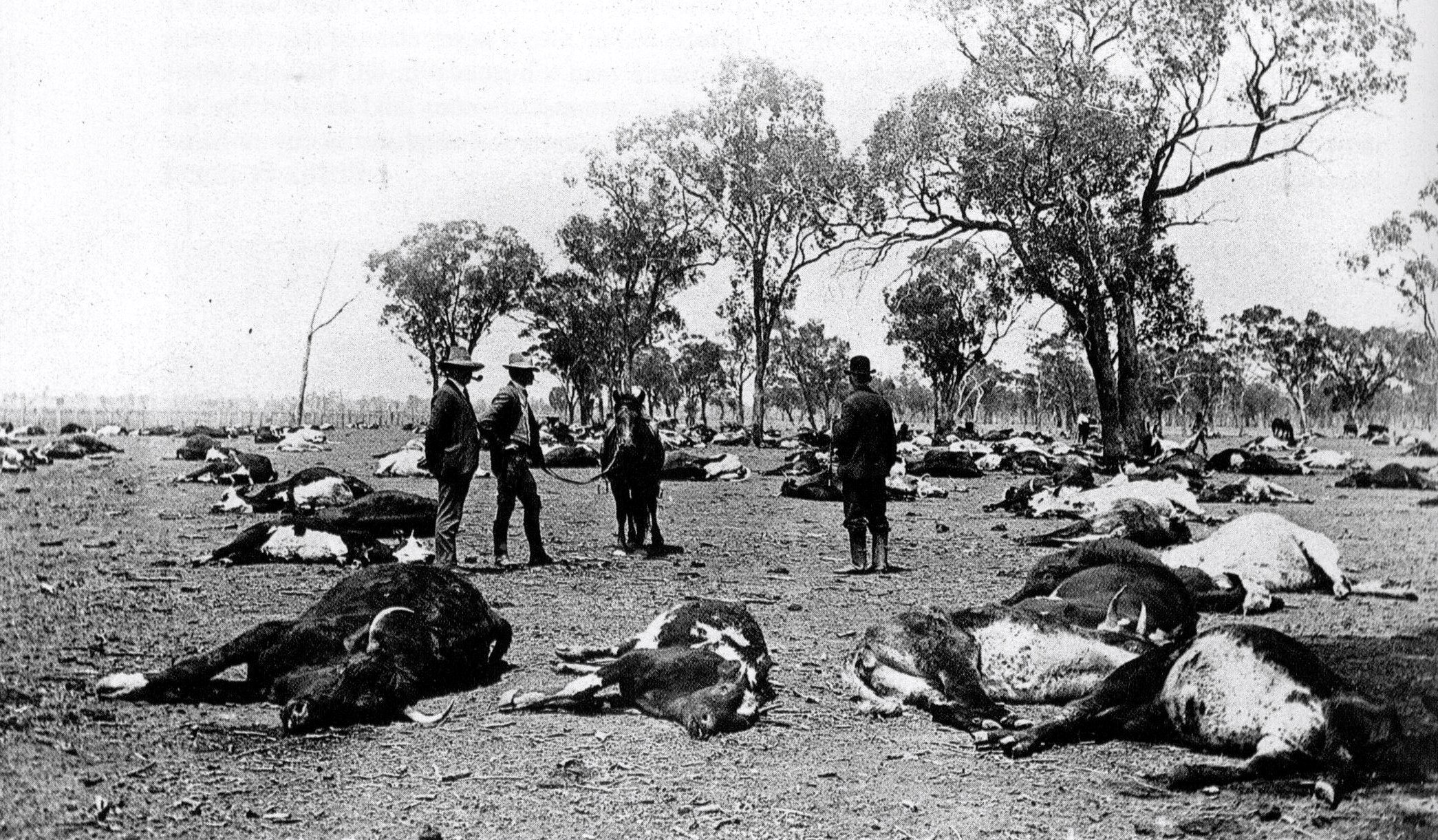
Australia, 1907: Cattlemen survey 700 carcasses of cattle that were killed overnight by a poisonous plant

During 1997, 125 head of cattle died after eating Kalanchoe delagoensis (mother-of-millions) on a travelling stock reserve near Moree, New South Wales.

== Notable travelling stock routes ==
The Strzelecki Track, from Lyndhurst in the south to Innamincka, South Australia and beyond in the north used to be one of the driest and loneliest tracks to transport mobs of fat cattle to the Adelaide market. It was Captain Starlight, of Robbery Under Arms fame, who gave the track notoriety. In 1870 Henry Arthur Readford, better known as Harry Redford, or Starlight, drove a thousand head of stolen cattle from Queensland, down the Barcoo and Cooper past Mount Hopeless, to Blanchewater where he sold them for $10,000. Although he was caught and went on trial for his crime, he was found not guilty by a jury largely impressed with his audacious feat of blazing a new cattle stock route, making him one of the greatest drovers in Australian history.

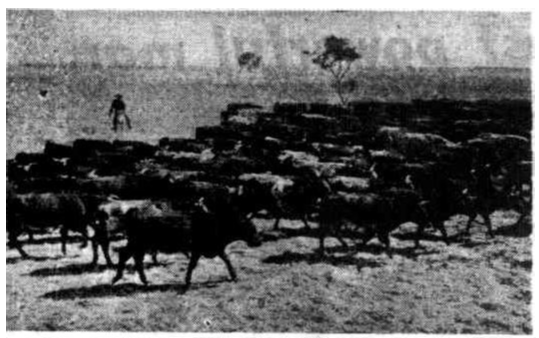
Stock on Murranji track after being dipped at Lake Nash (1953).

The Murranji Track in the Northern Territory, also known as the Ghost Road of the Drovers, was pioneered by the famous overlander Nathaniel Buchanan in 1881, when he drove large mobs of cattle along it. When Buchanan travelled the Murranji Track the Murranji Waterhole was one of the vital sources of water. If it was dry the cattle and horses faced a 110-mile 'dry stage' before reaching the next water. This route was considered the worst stock route of all. In one horrendous trip across this Track in 1905 one man died, all but two stockmen deserted the drover, 800 cattle and 11 horses died. vidence has been found that five or six persons definitely died around the Murranji Waterhole and about 12 on the whole track,while trying to negotiate it.

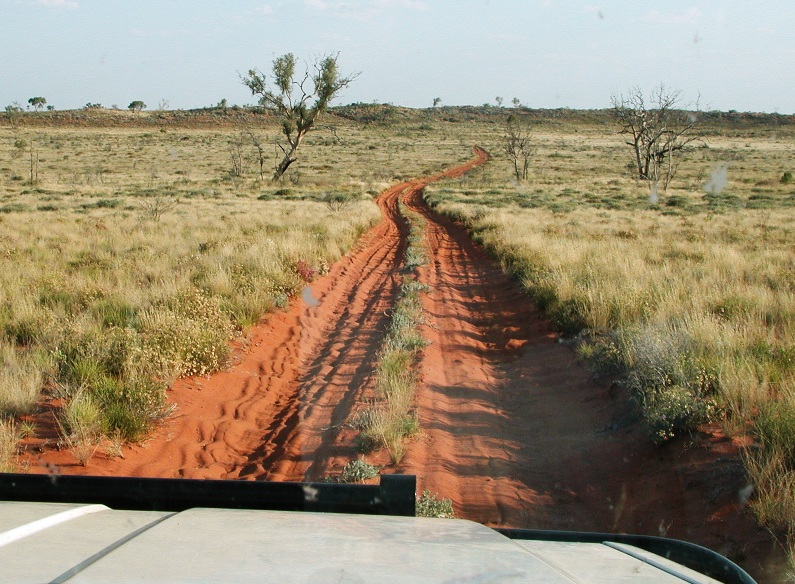
Little Sandy Desert as seen from the Canning Stock Route

The Birdsville Track is also a notorious stock route. The 520 km Birdsville Track was developed in the 1880s and runs across the desert in some seasons, from Birdsville, Queensland to Marree just north of the Flinders Ranges in South Australia. The remote track skirts the Simpson Desert and the Sturt Stony Desert and drovers relied on government provided artesian bores to water their stock along the route. On several occasions during the early years there were big losses of stock on this route. In 1901 Jack Clarke left Warenda Station, Queensland, with 500 fat bullocks but only had 72 when he reached Marree. Stock is now transported on trucks and the track is mostly used by tourists.

The Canning Stock Route was regarded as the loneliest and one of the most difficult routes. Crossing the Great Sandy Desert, the Little Sandy Desert and large portions of the Gibson Desert, it is almost 2,000 km long. It is a place of living history - the longest heritage trail in Australia. A series of wells, first dug between March 1908 and April 1910 by a party under the leadership of surveyor Alfred Canning, connect the stock route. These wells are generally situated on or near native water sources (soaks). In the early years of the stock route, several drovers were killed by Aboriginal people defending their land and water sources.

The Tanami Road or Tanami Track follows a cattle droving route northwest from the MacDonnell Ranges just north of Alice Springs to Halls Creek.

The Barkly Stock Route in the Northern Territory was also pioneered by Nat Buchanan and known for the epic cattle drives of the past that passed through the area en route to Queensland. Today this is a road known as the Overlander's Way (Barkly Highway) and is used by great road trains and visitors.

The Cobb Highway is part of a significant Travelling Stock Routes network that traverses New South Wales. The Bradfield Highway, which passes over the Sydney Harbour Bridge, is also a designated Travelling Stock Route.

== Current situation ==
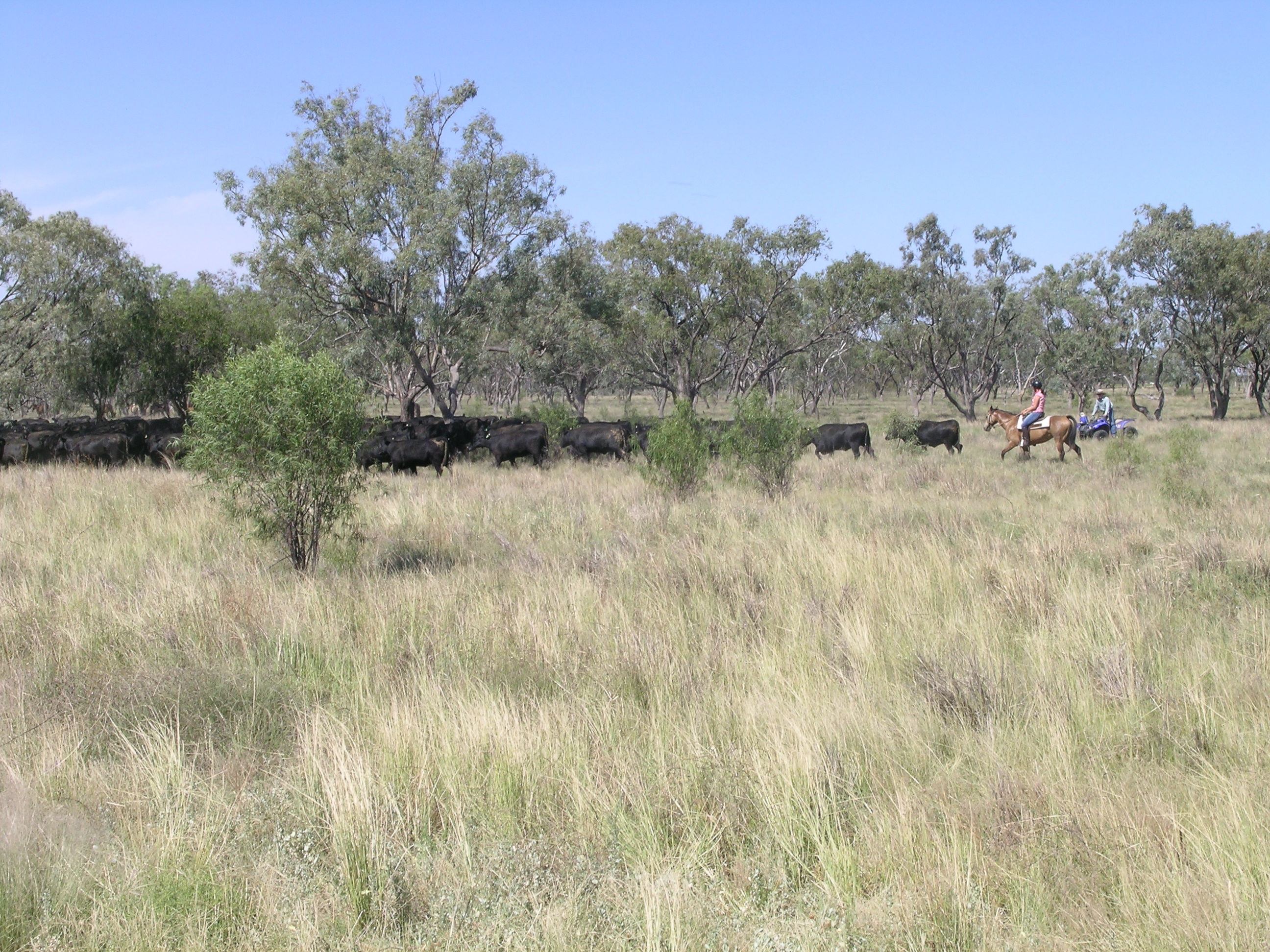
Modern droving on a Travelling Stock Route, Walgett, New South Wales

Although their original transport purpose has been mostly superseded, stock routes also sustain non-pastoral industries, including bee keeping, forestry, fossicking, mineral exploration and quarrying.

Travelling stock routes also provide crucial habitat and connectivity for many endangered species and ecosystems. Their length and density mean that they provide a comprehensive sample of the landscape and biodiversity of eastern Australia. Most predate the late Victorian gazetting of conservation reserves and thus provide substantial protection to highly cleared ecosystems that were targeted for agricultural clearing in the preceding colonial period, and are therefore under-represented in the national park system (e.g., the flat land west of the Great Dividing Range). The entire network is publicly owned and therefore represents the best remaining opportunity for conservationists to protect large amounts of threatened biodiversity. Further, the Travelling Stock Routes provide a serendipitous solution to the problem of biodiversity connectivity in the face of climate change. As temperature and rainfall patterns begin to change, the stock routes represent a set of corridors that organisms can safely transverse to reach appropriate climatic conditions.

A government review has recommended the Rural Lands Protection Board no longer manage the stock routes and "that travelling stock routes should be ceded back to the Department of Lands unless the local boards can provide a business case for their retention, which means they have to be profitable". A group of more than 450 scientists recently petitioned the Premiers of New South Wales and Queensland, asking them to intervene, to protect both the heritage and environmental values represented by the stock routes (the "Long Paddock Statement").

The Stock Routes Coalition is a group of organisations who have come together to have the NSW and Queensland Stock Routes declared 'Protected Corridors for Travelling Stock and Biodiversity', managed by the current managers and adequately resourced with supplements from public funds. It is a unique grouping of conservation organisations, scientists and drovers.

- Applied Environmental Decision Analysis (UQ)
- Birds Australia (BANQ, BAC, BASQ, BANN, BASNA)
- Bird Observation & Conservation Australia (BrisBOCA)
- Birds Queensland
- Chinchilla Field Naturalists Club
- Citizens Wildlife Corridors Armidale
- Droving and Stock Routes Association
- North Burnett Landcare
- National Parks Association of NSW
- National Parks Association of Qld
- Nature Conservation Council of NSW
- Qld Naturalists Club
- Ravensbourne and District Landcare
- South West NRM Ltd
- Tamworth Birdwatchers
- Toowoomba Field Naturalists Club
- Wildlife Preservation Society of Australia
- Wildlife Preservation Society of Qld
- WWF- Australia

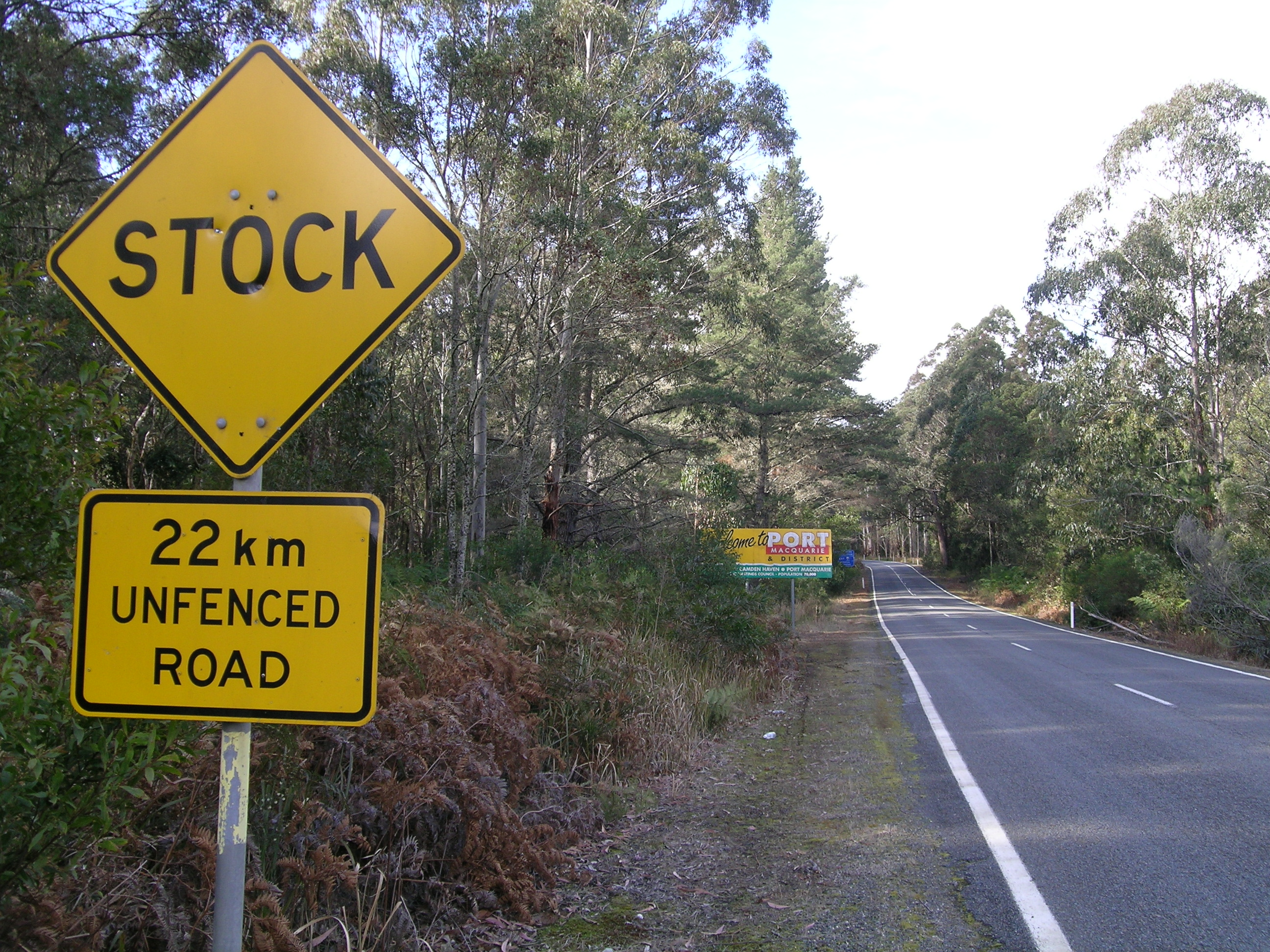
Unfenced road sign, Oxley Highway, NSW

In January 2009 Travelling Stock Routes came under the control of the new Livestock Health and Pest Authorities (LHPA) which replaced the Rural Lands Protection Board. The new LHPA has stated "that TSRs to be ceded back to the Department of Lands where they place an unreasonable financial burden on authorities (latter part of 2009)".

== Other roadside grazing ==
Shire councils often permit livestock to graze a designated stretch along a rural road during times of drought. A fee is paid to the council on a per head of livestock basis and the stock owner is permitted to use the selected strip to the exclusion of others.

In Australia many thousands of kilometres of roads are unfenced and this includes some highways. These roads usually pass through forests or private property.

== See also ==
- Drought in Australia
- Drovers' road
- Barwon Highway
- Overlanding
