= Owen Cummins =

Australian stockman and drover (1874–1953)

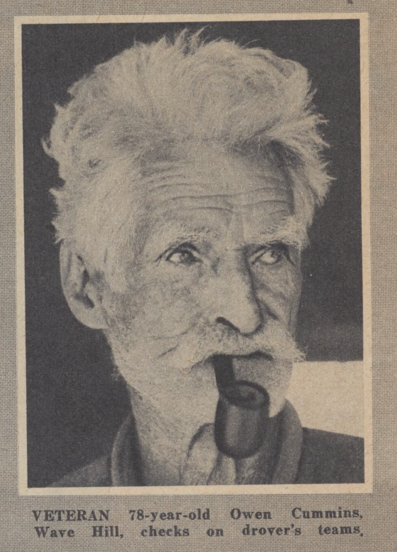
Owen Cummins as pictured in a 1952 article in Pix Magazine

Owen Stephen Cummins (13 September 1874 – 25 August 1953) was an Australian stockman, drover and horse breeder who is thought to be one of the possible inspirations for the poem A Man from Snowy River by Andrew Barton "Banjo" Paterson.

As a drover he worked in the Snowy Mountains and the Riverina districts of New South Wales before, around the turn of the century, moving to the Northern Territory. In the Northern Territory he worked of Victoria River Downs and Wave Hill Stations. Cummins is sometimes known as "The Territory's own man from Snowy River".

== Biography ==
Cummins grew up on his family's property on the Dargo River in Victoria where he was the third of nine children to Michael and Johanna Cummins who were Irish immigrants to Australia. His parents had come to Australia during the Victorian gold rush in the 1860s but had had limited success finding gold. Very early on he earned a reputation of a fearless rough rider and one of his feats was to jump from the top rail of a fence onto the backs of young horses without a saddle or a bridle.

He began droving at an early age and started working in the Snowy Mountains and Riverina districts where he developed a good reputation and was well known for his skill throughout the region.

It is likely that Cummins arrived in the Northern Territory around 1894 after a 'broken romance'; after his arrival he first worked on the Pine Creek goldfield as a blacksmith at 'The Enterprise' mine there. By 1914 he was working as a stockman on Victoria River Downs Station and while here he did horse breeding and also worked on donkey teams. During his employment there he was frequently required to travel to and from Wave Hill Station; he was identified by Gurindji man Ronnie Wavehill as someone who shot Aboriginal people "in the early days". This is supported by Albert Lalga, a Mudburra man, who made similar statements. For this reason he is likely to have been involved in the Wave Hill Station Massacre/s that took place between 1920 and 1922 and numerous other such massacres and events which took place during his time in the Northern Territory.

There are, however, other accounts saying that he saved a number of people during the Blackfellows Knob Massacre of 1895 (nearby Victoria River Downs Station) and that the report by Bill Wongiari, that he was "a good man" was supported by the elders who were listening.

In 1923 Cummins applied for a grazing license for land in the Tanami Desert, south of Wave Hill, and was successful. This was, however, short-lived as a lack of water forced him to give it up and he took up land at Frog Valley which was relinquished in 1928.

From around 1932 he was employed at Wave Hill and was in charge of the station stallions and often rode the boundaries between Wave Hill and Victoria River Downs stations.

Cummins died in his camp near the site of the original Wave Hill homestead on 25 August 1953 and is buried at the Wave Hill Cemetery. His name is commemorated on a water tank along the Murranji Track, at the Murranji Bore, and there is a monument to him at Kalkarindji. This monument calls him "The Territory's Own Man from Snowy River".

== Connection to "A Man from Snowy River" by Banjo Paterson ==
It is possible that Cummins was the inspiration, or one of the inspirations, for the poem "A Man from Snowy River" by Banjo Paterson as, although Cummins was only 16, at the time of publication (April 1890) he was very well known in the Snowy River regions.

Ted Evans, who wrote a brief biography of Cummins, stated:

I was to hear him make this claim on several convivial occasions, and as the level of the bottle receded, so his voice would become somewhat vehemently insistent of the truth of his claim. Basically, he was reticent man who rarely removed his pipe from his mouth with the result that his utterances were few and confined to essentials. But given a few drinks he could be voluble on the subject of horses and driving, particularly when in the company of his great droving friend, Charlie Swan. Like many others who know Owen Cummins at that time, I was sceptical of his Snowy River claim, particularly as he was inclined to avoid the subject when he was stone cold sober.

— Ted Evans, Owen Cummins 1874-1953 : the Territory's man from Snowy River, 1988

Ted Evans also talks about Cummins in an oral history interview (LANT NTRS 226 TS 46) with Library & Archives NT.

Despite this Banjo Paterson did state, on numerous occasions, that there was no particular individual who inspired the poem.
