= Toni Tapp Coutts =

Australian author (born 1955)

Toni Tapp-Coutts
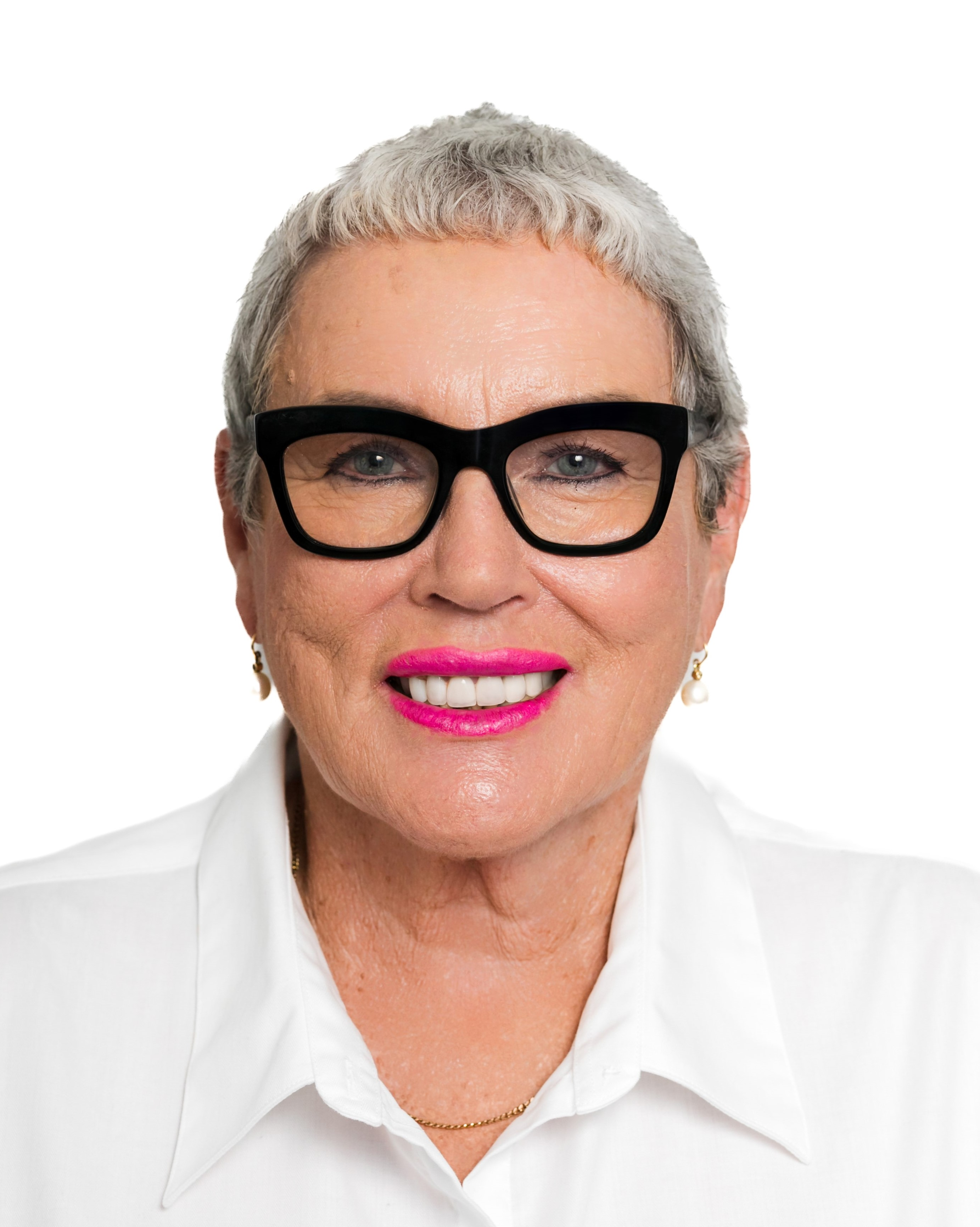
- Toni Tapp-Coutts
- Born: 1955 (age 70–71); Alice Springs, Northern Territory, Australia
- Occupation: Writer

Toni Tapp Coutts (born 7 November 1955) is an Australian author who has written extensively about her experiences growing up in the Northern Territory of Australia.

== Biography ==
Tapp Coutts was born in Alice Springs and grew up on Killarney Station after moving there when her mother, divorcee June Clements (née Forscutt) married cattleman Bill Tapp when she was 9 years old. She moved there with her mother and her two siblings; Billy and Shing. On the station, they lived in a shack with no electricity or running water, and found conditions very taxing. When Tapp Coutts and her family arrived at the house, it had a hand-painted sign stating 'Cockrag Downs'; she said the meaning of 'cockrag' was "broken down and uncared for". She said further of it:

The house was a Sidney Williams hut. A massive great big tin shed that had virtually three rooms. One end was the bedrooms, which were basically rows of beds with mosquito nets over them. That sort of defined the sleeping areas from where people lived or slept, other than my grandmother's room which had half a wall, and there was a toilet down the back, a long‐drop toilet down the back, which I was terrified of, and fall down the hole.

— Toni Tapp Coutts, Growing the Katherine – the Tapp family, 2009

Despite the hardships she loved where she grew up and was "happy on the land" with her friends and family. In her books she offers a tender portrait of the many characters who she encountered there and her love of the natural world. She said that she had an amazing childhood growing up with Aboriginal people, the Olkolo people, and being able to be part of observing and learning about their way of life. She says that everyone was family.

In 1974, Tapp Coutts married Shaun Coutts and in the early 1980s, after a short period in Victoria, they moved to McArthur River Station, nearby Borroloola, where Shaun had taken a job. There, Tapp Coutts became a cook, counsellor, housekeeper, and nurse to many in the region. While there, she created the Heartbreak Bush Ball and started riding campdraft in rodeos all over the Northern Territory, becoming one of the NT's top riders.

In 1994, they moved together to Katherine and, in her time there, she has been a board member of the NT Writers' Centre and coordinator of the Katherine region of the Writers' group. She is also a member of the Katherine Museum, Katherine Community Markets and has organised and participated in many local festivals and events including the Katherine Flying Fox Festival, the Fringe Festival and the Barunga Festival. She also served an elected member of the Katherine Town Council for 25 years (1996–2021) and ran, unsuccessfully, for the 2008 Northern Territory general election as an Independent.

She is a breast cancer survivor and overcame a major spinal infection in 2013 to 2014. During this time she formed a lobby group to establish a chemotherapy unit and cancer support office in Katherine. She is also a mother of three.

== Selected publications ==
- Tapp Coutts, Toni (2010). Bill Tapp : cattle king : the story about a big man with a big hat and a big heart. Toni Tapp Coutts, Katherine, N.T.
- Coutts, Toni Tapp (2010). Walking the Wet. In Meanjin. 69 (1), 143–147.
- Tapp Coutts, Toni (2016). A sunburnt childhood : growing up in the Territory. Hachette Australia, Sydney, NSW.
- Tapp Coutts, Toni (2017). My Outback Life : The sequel to the bestselling memoir A Sunburnt Childhood (Digital original). Hachette Australia, Sydney, New South Wales.
- Tapp Coutts, Toni & Lothian Children's Books (2018). My Outback Childhood (younger readers) : Growing up in the Territory (Digital original). Hachette Australia, Sydney, New South Wales.

Tapp Coutts also compiled the book Katherine street names in 2003.

== Collections ==
In 2020 and 2021 Tapp Coutts donated a collection of Personal and Community Archives (PCA 7) to Library & Archives NT: this collection consists of magazine and newspaper clippings, correspondence, personal papers and notes, event notices, ephemera, newsletters, CDs and posters relating to her family and community.
