= Jim Forscutt =

Former mayor of Katherine, Northern Territory, Australia

- Occupation: Politician

James Forscutt (born 1941) better known as Jim Forscutt, is a former Mayor of Katherine in the Northern Territory of Australia.

== Early life ==
Forscutt moved to the Northern Territory in 1947 as a six-year-old. Upon arrival, his family settled in a three-room Sidney Williams tin hut in Katherine.

Forscutt began his career on Killarney Station in owner Bill Tapp's stockcamp, working with his brother, Boko Forscutt. His sister, June, later married Tapp. In March 1963, his brother, Boko, drowned in the Katherine River in March 1963. Jim retrieved his body the following day.

In 1969, Forscutt bought the local soft drink factory, known locally as the "Lolly Water Factory", from the Scott family, expanding the business to supply Tennant Creek and Adelaide River.

== Political career ==
Forscutt served on the Katherine Town Council for 23 years. He joined local government in 1972, serving on the town management board. He was elected as an alderman in 1982. He was then elected Mayor of Katherine, serving for the next sixteen years. In 2015, Forscutt received a local government long service award.

== Later life ==
Forscutt owns 400-hectare property north of Katherine. He runs a small herd of Brahman cattle on the property.

He was the president of the Local Government Association in the Northern Territory and the junior vice-president of the national Local Government Association in 2012.
