= Drover (Australian) =

Person who moves livestock over long distances

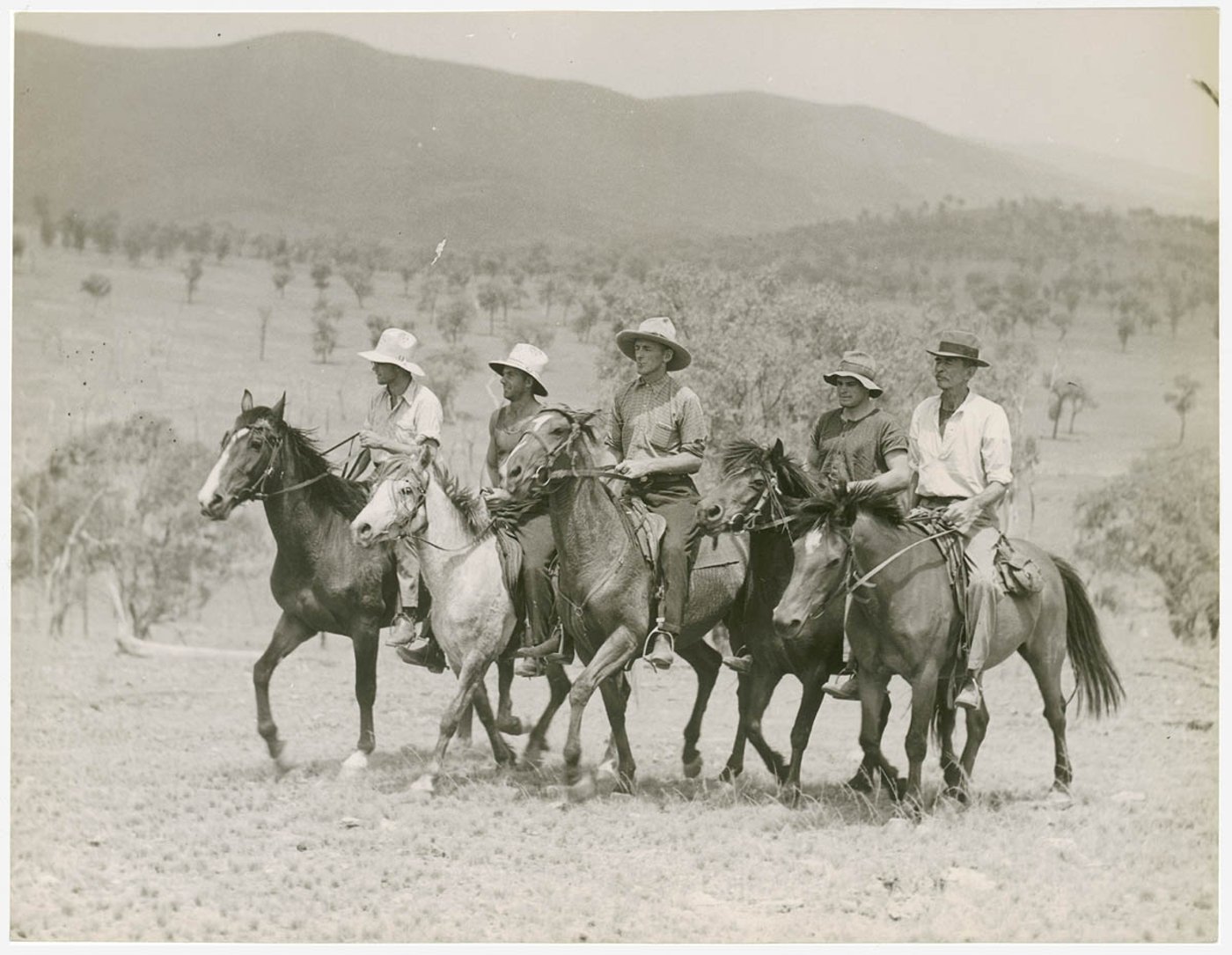
Drovers NSW 1942

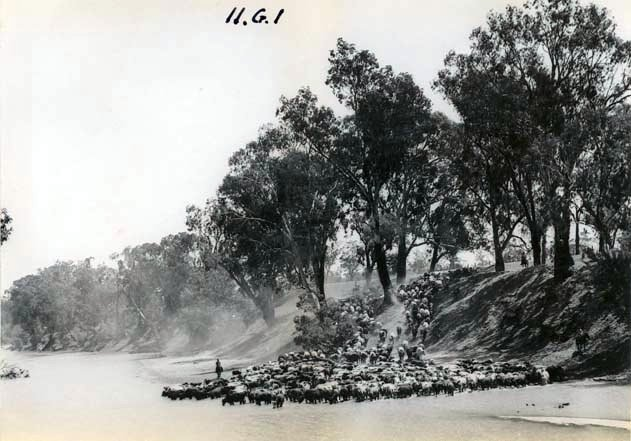
A mob of cattle crossing the MacIntyre River from Queensland to New South Wales

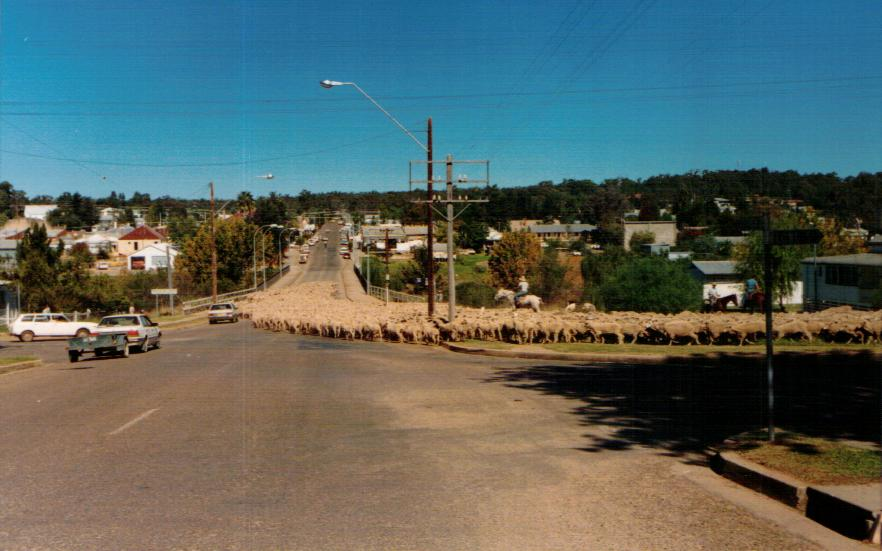
Sheep droving through the town of Warialda in northern New South Wales

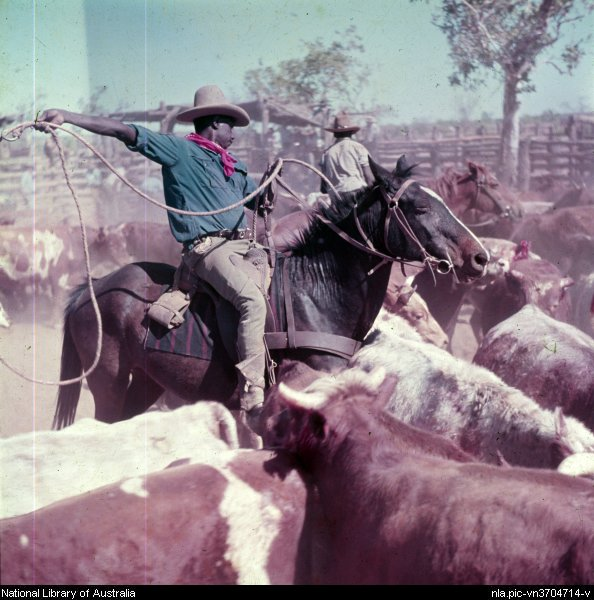
Indigenous stockman at Victoria River Downs Station

A drover in Australia is a person, typically an experienced stockman, who moves livestock, usually sheep, cattle, and horses "on the hoof" over long distances. Reasons for droving may include: delivering animals to a new owner's property, taking animals to market, or moving animals during a drought in search of better feed and/or water or in search of a yard to work on the livestock. The drovers who covered very long distances to open up new country were known as "overlanders".

== Method ==
Moving a small mob of quiet cattle is relatively easy, but moving several hundreds or thousands head of wild station cattle over long distances is a very different matter. Long-distance moving large mobs of stock was traditionally carried out by contract drovers. A drover had to be independent and tough, an excellent horseman, able to manage stock as well as men. The boss drover who had a plant (horses, dogs, cooking gear and other requisites) contracted to move the mob at a predetermined rate according to the conditions, from a starting point to the destination. The priorities for a boss drover were the livestock, the horses, and finally the men, as drovers were paid per head of stock delivered. Drovers were sometimes on the road for as long as two years.

Traditional droving could not have been done without horses. The horse plant was made up of work-horses, night-horses and packhorses, with each drover riding four or five horses during a trip. The horse tailer was the team member responsible for getting horses to water and feed, and bringing them to the camp in the morning. A good night-horse was highly prized for its night vision, temperament, and its ability to bring animals under control when a "rush", known elsewhere as a stampede, occurred at night.

The standard team of men employed to move 1,200 cattle consisted of seven men: the boss drover, four stockmen, a cook and a horse-tailer. Store cattle were moved in larger mobs, of up to 1,500 head, while fat bullocks going to meatworks were taken in mobs of about 650 head, i.e. three train loads. The stockmen will ride in formation at the front, sides and back of the mob, at least until the mob has settled into a routine pace. Cattle are expected to cover about ten miles (16 km) a day, sheep about six miles (9.7 km), and are permitted to spread up to 800 metres (half a mile) on either side of the road. Occasionally mobs of horses were moved by drovers. A short camp is made for a lunch break, after which the cook and horse-tailer will move ahead to set up the night camp.

A continual watch is kept over cattle during the night camp, usually with one horseman riding around the mob unless the cattle are restless, when two riders would be used. A rush can be started by a sudden noise such as a dingo howl, a bolt of lightning, or sparks from a fire. Drovers tell vivid stories of chaotic conditions when several hundred cattle start a rush at night. If the cattle head towards the drovers' camp, the best option may be to quickly climb a sturdy tree if any are available. Many drovers have been trampled to death in a rush, sometimes still in their swags.

During long "dry stages" extra care will be taken of the stock, and this may involve droving during the night to conserve the animals’ energy. About three kilometres before water is reached, the animals will be held and small groups will be taken to drink in order that the cattle do not rush and injure or drown others.

A "cattle train drover" is a person who accompanies a mob of cattle on a train while they are being transported to a new location. The goods trains provide special accommodation for these drovers in specially constructed guard's vans. Queensland is now the only state to run cattle trains.

== Heyday ==
The first droving over a significant distance occurred in 1836 when 300 cattle were moved by Joseph Hawdon in 26 days from the Murrumbidgee River to Melbourne, a distance of about 480 km. Also in 1836, Edward John Eyre drove stock from New South Wales to the Port Phillip district. As droving skills were developed, more challenging assignments were undertaken.

During the late 1830s, settlers began to move into countryside near Adelaide. There followed expeditions to bring sheep and cattle to Adelaide from New South Wales. The first such expedition was led by Eyre, which started in December 1837 and followed the path of Charles Sturt along the Murray–Darling River system. Eyre's party comprised eight stockmen, 1000 sheep, and 600 head of cattle, which started out from Monaro in New South Wales. The party arrived in Adelaide in July 1838.

During the following years, the traffic on the Murray–Darling route would grow enormously. At its height, there was an almost continuous train of sheep, cattle, bullock drays, and horses along the route. Many Aboriginal Australians lived along the route. They sometimes received "injudicious treatment" from the Europeans—in the words of Governor George Gawler. Such treatment included sexual abuse of Aboriginal women and wanton shooting of Aboriginal people. That led to an escalating cycle of conflicts between Aboriginal people and Europeans. For example, drover Henry Inman lost all 5000 of his sheep, when Aboriginal people attacked his party, in April 1841. And in August 1841, drover William Robinson and his party, together with a policing force, killed at least 30 Aboriginal people, in the Rufus River massacre. In 1863, boss drover George Gregory drove 8,000 sheep from near Rockhampton to the Northern Territory border, some 2,100 km, taking seven months. In the early 1870s, Robert Christison overlanded 7,000 sheep from Queensland to Adelaide, a distance of 2,500 km.

Patrick Durack and his brother Michael trekked across the north of Australia from their property on Coopers Creek in Queensland, which they left in 1879 along with 7250 breeding cattle and 200 horses, to the Kimberley region of Western Australia near Kununurra where they arrived in 1882. The 3,000 miles (4,828 km) journey of cattle to stock Argyle Downs and Ivanhoe Station is the longest of its type ever recorded.

Charles and William MacDonald left their property near Tuena, New South Wales, in 1883 bound to establish a new pastoral lease, Fossil Downs Station, in the Kimberley of Western Australia some 5,600 kilometres (3,480 mi) away. They left with 700 head of cattle and 60 horses during drought conditions as they trekked through Queensland. Arriving at the property in June 1886 with 327 cattle and 13 horses they reunited with their brother Dan.

The most famous Outback stock routes were the Murranji Track, the Birdsville Track, the Strzelecki Track and the Canning Stock Route. The Canning was regarded as the loneliest, the most difficult, and the most dangerous.

== Decline ==
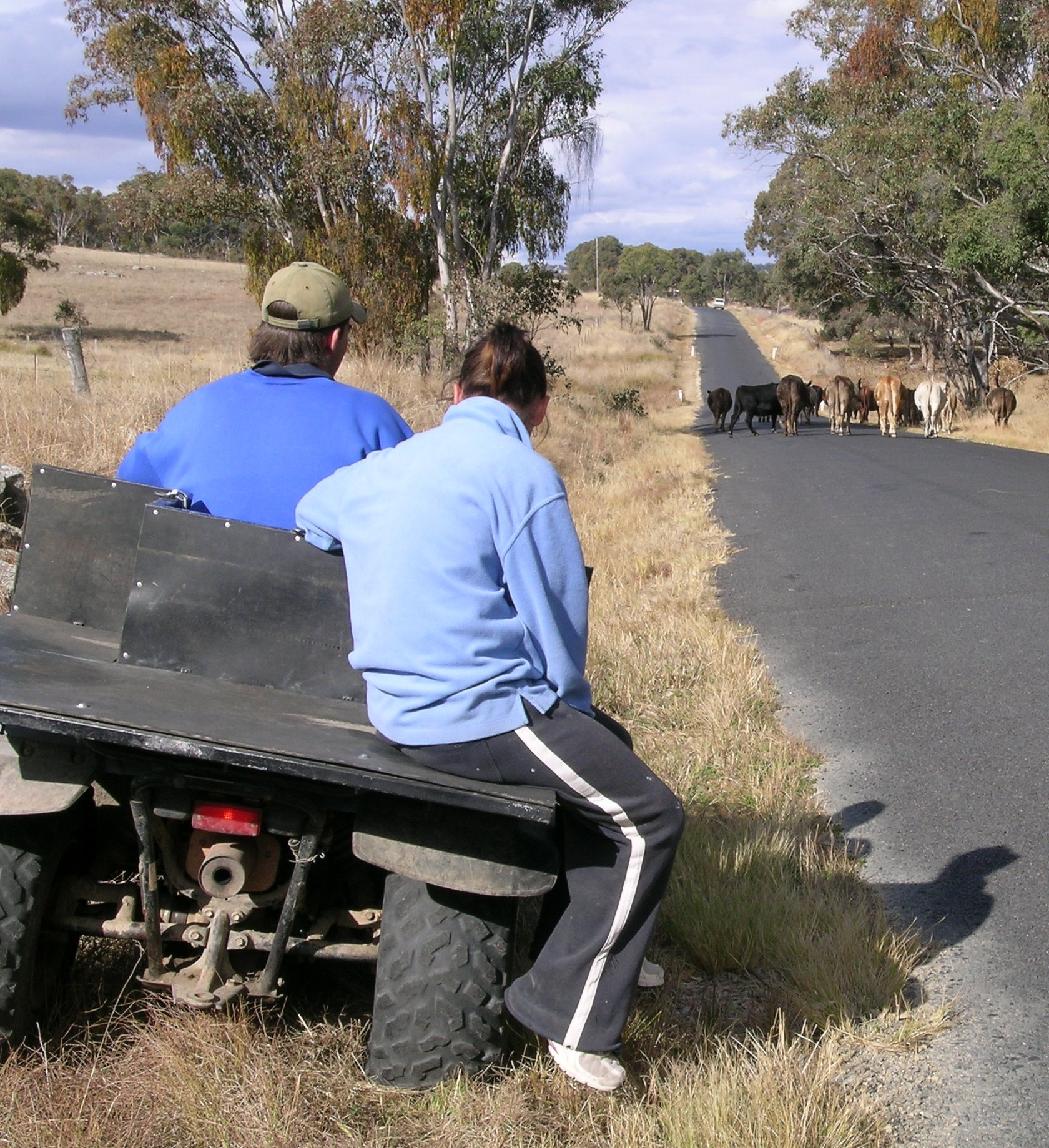
A modern way to move some stock

The gradual introduction of railways from about the 1860s made some droving work unnecessary. However, the work of the overlanders and drovers in general fell away rapidly in the 1960s as trucking of animals became the norm. Road trains carrying large number of animals are today a common sight in rural and Outback areas. But during times of drought, taking animals onto the "long paddock", the fenced travelling stock route, along a public road, is common practice even today, and droving skills are still required. The modern drover is now typically assisted with modern equipment, such as motorcycles, all-terrain vehicles, a truck and/or trailer for the horses, if they are used. Caravans are commonly used, along with generators to provide extra comfort and convenience. Stock may be enclosed at night in an area that has been fenced off with a temporary electric fence.

Localised droving was common in the Kosciuszko National Park and Alpine National Park and High Plains areas, until the areas became National Parks. The drovers would often bring cattle from the lower pastures to the fresh green pastures for the summer months. During the summer months many of the drovers would often stay in mountain huts like Daveys Hut, Whites River Hut and Mawsons Hut.

== Notable drovers ==
In 1881, Nat Buchanan, regarded by many as the greatest drover of all, took 20,000 cattle from St George in Southern Queensland to the Daly River, not far south of Darwin, a distance of 3,200 km.

Cattle stealing has long been part of Australia's history and some of the country's biggest droving feats have been performed by cattle rustlers or duffers. The most notable one was Harry Redford who established a reputation as an accomplished drover when he stole 1,000 cattle from Bowen Downs Station near Longreach, Queensland in 1870 and drove them 1,500 miles (2,400 km). His route took him through very difficult country down the Thomson, Barcoo, Cooper and Strezlecki rivers thus pioneering the Strzelecki Track.

Women have been noted as exceptional drovers as well. One of the true legends of the outback is Edna Zigenbine, better known as Edna Jessop, who took over a droving job from her injured father, and became a boss drover at 23. Along with her brother Andy and four ringers, they moved the 1,550 bullocks the 2,240 kilometres across the Barkly Tableland to Dajarra, near Mount Isa, Queensland.

== Droving in popular culture ==
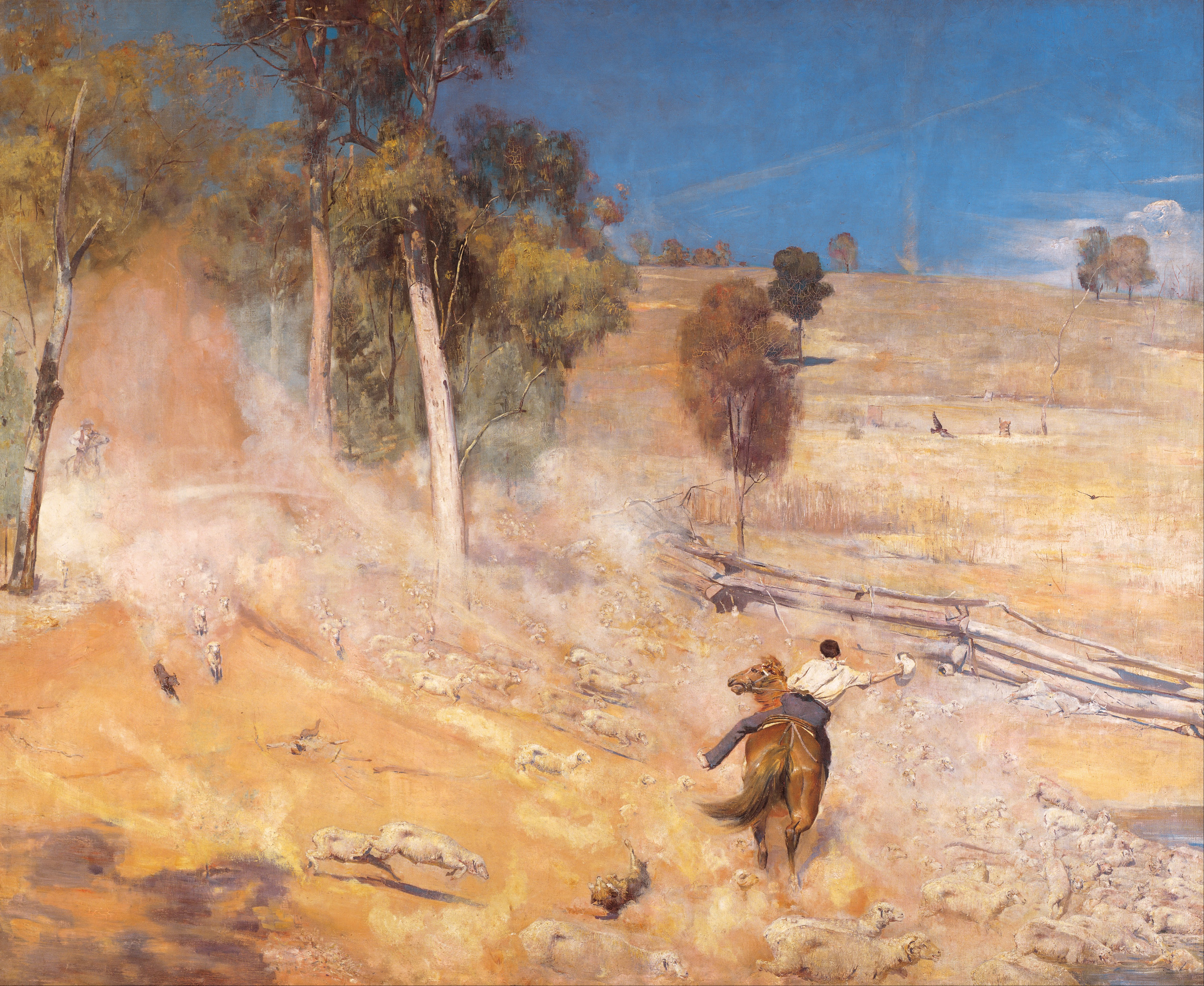
Tom Roberts, A breakaway! (1891), Art Gallery of South Australia

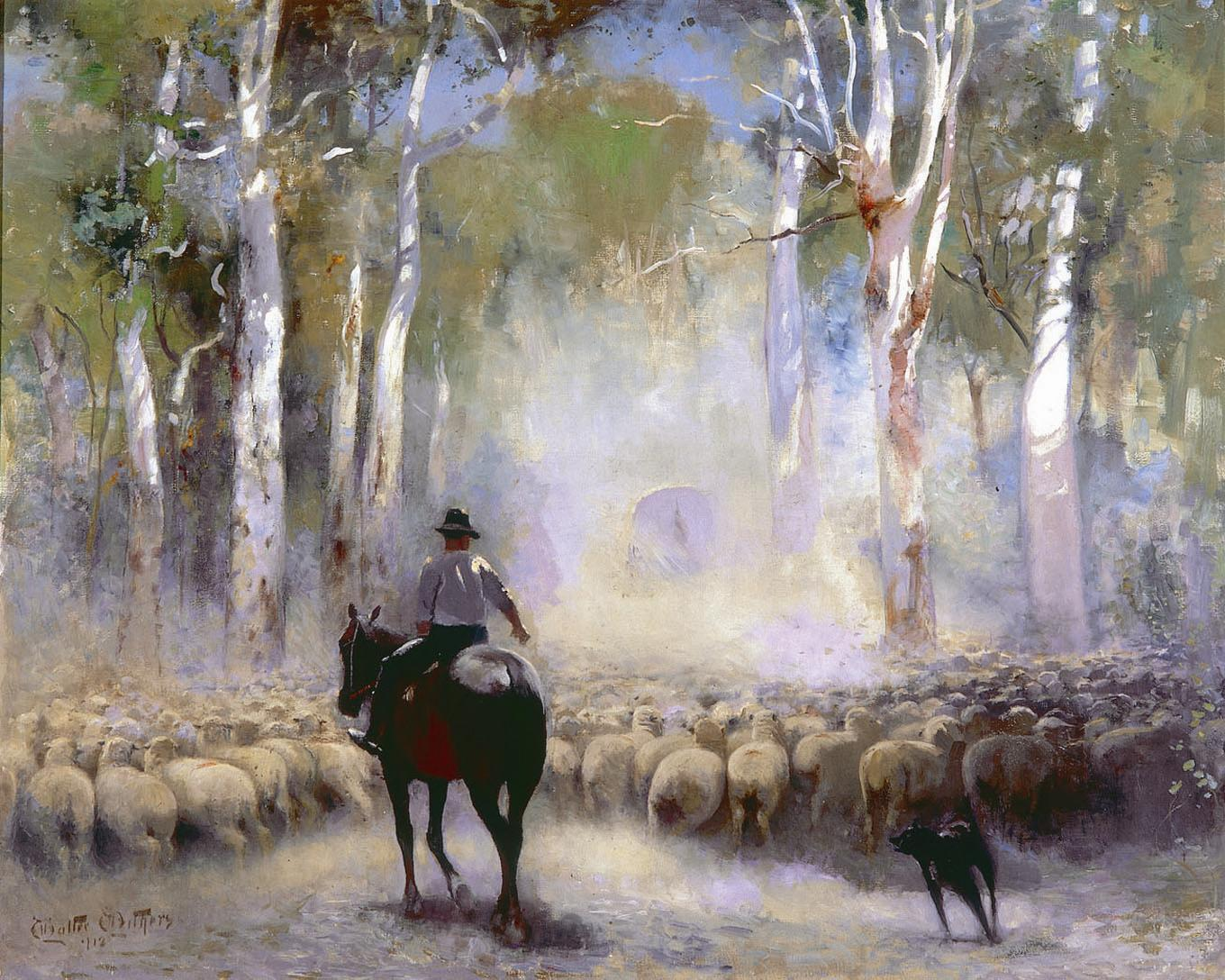
Walter Withers, The Drover (1912), Bendigo Art Gallery

Hans Heysen, Droving into the Light (1914–21), Art Gallery of Western Australia

Much literature has been written about droving, particularly balladic poetry.

An idealised image of the droving life is described in the poem Clancy of the Overflow, and more realistically depicted in the historical film The Overlanders.

- Henry Lawson
  - "The Ballad of the Drover" (poem)
  - "Andy's Gone with Cattle" (poem)
  - "The Drover's Wife" (short story)
- Will H. Ogilvie
  - "From the Gulf" (poem)
  - "The Overlander" (poem)
  - "A Leaf from Macquarie" (poem)
- Banjo Paterson
  - "Clancy of the Overflow" (poem)
  - "In the Droving Days" (poem)
  - "The Travelling Post Office" (poem)
- Judith Wright – "South of My Days" (poem)
- Kev Carmody – "Droving Woman" (song)
- Adam Lindsay Gordon – "The Sick Stockrider" (poem)
- Rolf Harris – "Tie me Kangaroo down, Sport!" (song)
- Anonymous – "The Overlander" (folk song)
- Anonymous – "Wrap me up in my Stockwhip and Blanket" (folk song)
- Anonymous – "The Three Drovers" (Christmas song)
- Saul Mendelsohn – "Brisbane Ladies" (folk song)
- Hugh McDonald (of Redgum) – "Diamantina Drover" (song)

also performed by John Williamson

- Bill Callahan – "Drover" (song)
- Bill 'Swampy' Marsh – Great Australian Droving Stories (book)
- Bok, Tricket, & Muir – "Johnny Stewart, Drover" (folk song)
- Ralph Vaughan Williams – Hugh the Drover, opera
- Ted Egan — The Drover's Boy

also performed by John Williamson

- Louis Esson – "The Drovers" (play)
- Nicole Kidman and Hugh Jackman (as a drover) appeared in the Australian period film Australia, set around a droving trip in the remote Northern Territory.
- In the Australian hit drama show McLeod's Daughters, the McLeod family runs a fictional cattle station named Drovers Run. The series two-part finale is centred around the need to move their cattle across a long distance in order to make a sale and save the family farm.

== See also ==
- Cattle drives in the United States
- Cowboy
- Drovers' road
- Droving
- Stock route
- The Drover's Wife (disambiguation)
- Shepherds
