= Cowboy bedroll =

One of the precursors of the modern sleeping bag

The cowboy bedroll was an American Old West precursor to the modern sleeping bag, which carried a man's bed and some personal belongings in a waterproof shell. In Australia, it is called a swag.

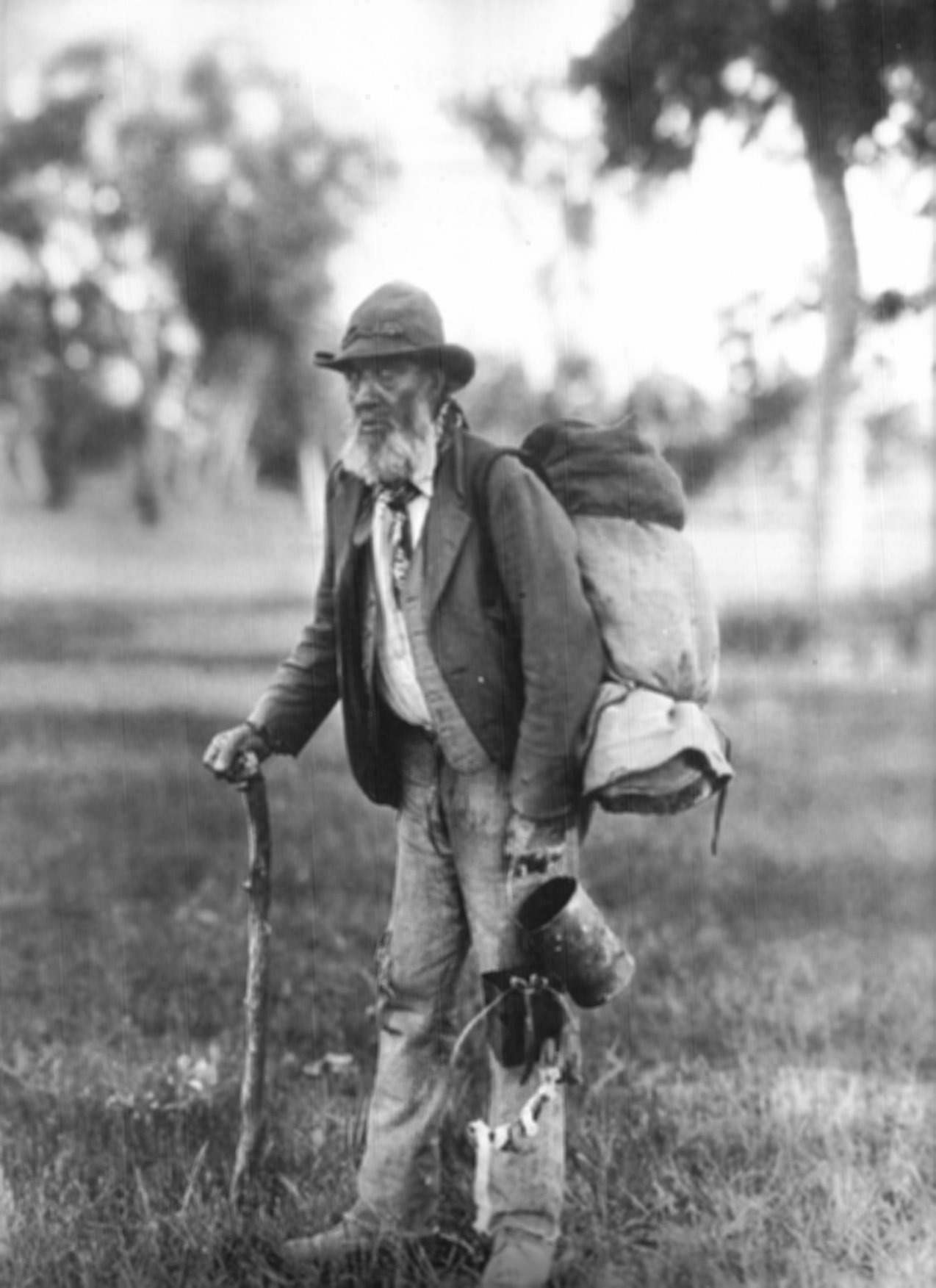
A "swagman" from Australia carrying a variation of the cowboy bedroll, called a "swag", ca. 1901

== Origins ==
It is unclear when or how the roll developed, but it has been used in its variations from the United States, Canada, Mexico, Argentina, Australia, South Africa, among other places. However, one item just predating the "Cowboy" era that was very familiar to most cowboys – many of whom were veterans of the American Civil War – was the Confederate soldier's rolled bedding that was carried slipped diagonally over one shoulder and tied together just over one hip. A vital part of this "bedding roll" was the "rubber blanket", a rectangle of heavy canvas with brass eyelets at the corners and edges, that was heavily coated with vulcanized "Goodyear" latex rubber. Each Federal soldier was issued one, but both sides write of having acquired two or more, either through capture or acquisition on the battlefield. This rubber blanket was carried rolled around the rolled-up wool blanket and served as a groundcloth, sunshade, hasty tent, or any other purpose the soldier could devise. This rubber blanket was very waterproof which made it possible for the soldier to sleep relatively dry for the first time in the history of warfare. Prior to this time, most soldiers of the world's regular armies may or may not have been issued a wool blanket. Very crude groundcloths of "painted canvas" were sometimes secured by the soldier themselves, but at best, the soldier could count on waking wet and cold. In the Civil War, the usual practice was to spread one rubber blanket on the ground, arrange the wool blanket on the rubber blanket, and, if available, spread a second rubber blanket on top of the wool blanket. The soldier slept directly on the rubber blanket, uncoated side up, and the wool blanket over the recumbent soldier. In practice, it almost duplicated the cowboy bedroll. The addition of the waterproof tarp of the cowboy bedroll may well have descended from this source.

The bedroll is not prefigured in the history of the Midwestern United States, where several of the older states, notably Ohio, Indiana, Illinois, Iowa, and Missouri, were noted c. 1830-65 as breeding and finishing grounds for great numbers of cattle, and from which these cattle were routinely "walked" to markets as far east as New York City, until the wholesale introduction of farming machinery in the postbellum era caused an economic shift toward grain culture, primarily wheat and corn. Photographs exist of it, notably one in Albert Marrin's Cowboys, Indians, and Gunfighters, but they tend not to be specifically dated. Will James, writing from 1924-1942, referred to the bedroll and portrayed it in his sketches, as did Stan Lynde. Louis L'Amour, who took some pride in the authenticity of his backgrounds, suggested in The Cherokee Trail (set c. 1863) that the roll may have existed as early as the Civil War, as he has a character say he'll "just throw my bed under that tree." It may have developed from the elementary bedding used by the mountain man, who generally used only a Mackinaw blanket and a buffalo robe or bearskin, cured with the hair on. The one certainty is that it was widespread, as authors on the subject generally agree that most roundups and trail drives had at least one "bed wagon" (sometimes more), specifically intended for the transport of cowboys' personal beds and other belongings.

== Construction ==
The foundation of the bedroll consisted of a thoroughly waterproofed canvas tarpaulin weighing, most often, 18 oz. per square yard (i.e., 9 sq. ft.), and measuring between 6x14ft. and 7x18.

== Use ==
To prepare the bed for sleeping, the cowboy laid it out with the tarp folded roughly in half at the middle, creating a near-square 6–7 ft. wide and 7–9 ft. long, and centered his bedding between the two long edges, with the top side of the tarp (2.5 to 3 ft. longer than the bottom, so it could be pulled completely over his head if desired) turned back. If the weather looked threatening, he folded the sides under to the edge of the bedding, thereby preventing water from entering, and pulled the flap up when he turned in. In the morning, he spread the tarp out to its full extent, centered the bedding on the resulting oblong, and folded its two long edges up. He folded the tarp over on either side, fastening the hooks together, and placed his war bag near the upper end; folded the tarp over the bag, and tied it with a piece of thong so the bag would not slide around; and rolled the whole up into a cylinder. He secured it by means of a pair of leather straps with buckles, or with a couple of lengths of clothesline or worn-out lariat which he tied around it near the two ends, and a third piece of rope running from one of these to the other to form a handle. [See pictures in The Cowboy at Work, p. 46, and The Cowboy Life, p. 30.]

If the cowboy was working from headquarters or a line camp, he spread his roll on the floor or in a bunk. If he was out with "the wagon" (meaning a roundup or trail outfit), the bed was rolled and loaded to go along; the first thing he did after crawling out in the morning was to roll and tie it, pack it over to the bed wagon, and dump it where it would be conveniently at hand when camp-moving time came. (Not to do so was a serious breach of camp etiquette, and was moreover likely to earn the careless one the rough side of the cook's tongue.) Often he sat on it while he ate, which was quite permissible as long as he moved it afterwards. If he went to town for a while, he took his roll, which was also his trunk, and dumped it in the corner of his hotel or boarding-house room—or else unrolled it in a stable loft or in the trees down by the river, which was cheaper. If he was drifting over the range he tied it on his pack horse and it went wherever he did. In wet weather he took his hat, rope, boots, and spurs to bed with him; in cold weather his bridle came too. (Wet boots were hard to put on, and a wet rope was stiff and hard to handle; a cold bridle meant a cold bit, and the horse would fight it.) In rainy, snowy, windy, and/or sleety weather, he pulled up the canvas flaps of his roll and remained snug and warm (the waterproof tarpaulin underneath him kept ground moisture from seeping in). If the roll was covered with snow and ice during the night, the extra weight made it that much warmer inside. If when he woke it was freezing cold outside, he dressed a la Pullman berth, without quitting his warm blankets. If, on the other hand, the weather was warm, he could arrange his blankets in such a way as to have most of them underneath him and only one (perhaps the blanket sheet) over him. Some men also carried a 3-ft. canvas triangle with a grommet at each corner and another centering each edge; this could be rigged in half-a dozen ways as a windbreak or rain-roof, or rolled and shoved under the sougans for a pillow. Near the foot the cowboy kept his hobbles, latigo straps, dirty laundry, extra (usually fancy) spurs, and whatever else he might happen to have. If he owned a suit (4–5 lb.) and a couple of good shirts (1.25–1.875 lb.) for dressy wear, they were tucked in between the sougans, where they stayed both clean and wrinkle-free.

The war bag seems to have been used primarily as a pillow and for clothing (which provided the stuffing), and it is likely that the cowboy rolled each item up in a tight cylinder, as the modern backpacker does, to save space. He generally had, besides what he was wearing, a change or two of trousers or jeans, one or two sets of underwear, and one to four shirts, as well as clean socks and perhaps a second pair of boots. A lightweight jacket, such as a denim jumper, and an extra vest would be kept there too. This would come to a total of about 23–26 lb., or as much as 33 if "good" clothing was present, plus the bedding itself, which ran roughly 30–44, not counting anything else he might have tucked away in the bag (ranging from extra tobacco to books to personal papers to odd small collectibles, jewelry, etc., which was why it was considered unhealthy to be caught prowling through another man's bedroll). The roll also made a cylinder 12 to 14 inches thick, which was both too bulky and too heavy to tie behind the cantle of a saddle. Thus the cowboy would need a pack horse as well as his mount.

== Bibliography ==
- Adams, Ramon F., The Old-Time Cowhand (1961, Macmillan Co., NY)
- Morris, Michele, The Cowboy Life (1993, Fireside) ISBN 978-0671866822
- Ward, Fay E., The Cowboy at Work (2003, Dover) ISBN 978-0486426990
- 1897 Sears Roebuck Catalog (2007, Skyhorse, ISBN 1602390630)
- 1895 Montgomery Ward Catalog (1969, Dover, ISBN 0486223779)
- Marrin, Wayne Swanson, Why the West Was Wild (2004, Arnick Press, Toronto)
- Marrin, Albert, Cowboys, Indians, and Gunfighters (1993, Atheneum)
- L'Amour, Louis, The Cherokee Trail (Bantam, 1982)
