= Murranji Track =

Stock route in Northern Territory, Australia

Sister Ellen Kettle vehicle while travelling on the Murranji track, 1962

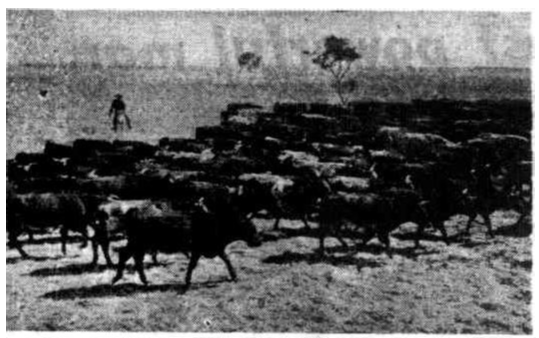
Stock on Murranji Track after being dipped at Lake Nash, 1953

The Murranji Track or Murranji Stock Route is a stock route in the Northern Territory of Australia and it runs between Newcastle Waters and Top Springs. The track was primarily operational between 1904 and the late 1960s and it attracted descriptions as the "ghost road of the Drovers" and the "death track". It was used as an entry point to the Barkly Tableland and it is nearby to Wave Hill, Auvergne and Victoria River Downs Stations.

It is on the lands of the Mudburra and Djingili peoples and their rights to this land has been established by the Aboriginal Land Rights (Northern Territory) Act 1976 and the Native Title Act 1993.

Use of the track declined from 1966 when the Buchanan Highway was completed and it is now rarely used as a stock route and is now an unsealed road. It is 644 km long.

== History ==
The land surrounding the Murranji Track was first explored by Europeans by John McDouall Stuart who found it impenetrable and it was first used as a track by pastoralist and drover Nat Buchanan in 1886 when taking cattle to The Kimberleys (Western Australia). Buchanan travelled alongside Gordon Buchanan, "Greenhide" Sam Croker, Willie Glass, Archie Ferguson and Mick Berry. Their journey was successful as they were led through by a Mudburra guide, who showed them where to find water, and the name "Murranji" comes from the name for a species of burrowing frog in the Mudburra language.

Use of the track was limited until, in 1904, one of Sidney Kidman's drover's, Blake Miller used it and it became a popular shortcut; despite this at least 11 drovers are known to have died along its route.

It was notoriously difficult to transport stock on this track because of the lack of waterholes, with dry stages of up to 180 km, dense scrub (thorny lancewood and bullwaddy) and limestone soil. When moving cattle the limestone soil had the effect of making a drumming sound; this often spooked cattle. The main water sources were soakages named the Bucket (Wirntirrkuji), the Murranji and Yellow Waterhole (Binjacootra). The Bucket was named for an iron bucket left there by Buchanan.

Ernestine Hill wrote about the history and development of the track for Walkabout (magazine) in 1949.

Major improvements were made to the track during World War II with government bores being built and bulldozers being used to smooth the road; writing about these improvements Hilda Abbott said "since then the cattle have walked like gentlemen through wide, scrub-bordered boulevards". Abbott also said of the track more generally:

Just after the "Wet" the Murranji is magic. It lies in the southern fringe of the jungle country winding through close forests of tall straight lancewoods. Bulwaddi trees with gnarled branches and spindly dark foliage are sombre and savage looking but the bloodwoods will be in bloom, each creamy blossom holding a globule of honey.

— Hilda Abbott, ABC Weekly, 10 November 1951

One of the most famous trips on the Murranji Track was by Edna Zingenbine in 1950 who was the first female "Boss Drover" and made headlines throughout Australia. In the 1950s it was also frequently travelled by Bill Tapp who established a droving business which used it regularly. It was also travelled by Ellen Kettle in 1962 as pictured above.

== Graffiti ==
The tanks along the Murranji Track are also home to a significant collection of graffiti, these date from the late 1930s to the 1960s and are a unique form of documentation along the track. All of these messages are faded and some have completely disappeared but many still survive. The graffiti primarily consists of messages, insults, poems, laments and drawings of the Murranji drovers. There are also a number of signatures including one by Owen Cummins the "Territory's own man from Snowy River".

The remaining drawings were photographed and traced onto plastic sheets by archaeologist and historian Darrell Lewis. The graffiti have been replicated in Lewis' detailed history of the track in The Murranji track: ghost road of the drovers (2007).

== Resources about ==
- Lewis, Darrell (2007). The Murranji track: ghost road of the drovers. Rockhampton, QLD CQU Press.
- Australia. Office of the Aboriginal Land Commissioner & Kearney, William & Australia. Department of Aboriginal Affairs & Northern Territory. Administrator & Australia. (1987). Murranji land claim.

== Notable drovers on the Track ==
- Beetaloo Jangari Bill
- Nathaniel Buchanan
- Sam Croker
- Owen Cummins
- William Linklater
- Edna Zigenbine

== Coordinates ==
- The Track begins at Murrunji, nearby the Queensland border: 17.009229°S 133.136645°E
- A midway point is the Murranji Bore: 16.836831°S 132.804032°E
- It ends at Peak Knob: 16.67165°S 132.11774°E

Map
