= Ronnie Wavehill =

Australian Aboriginal activist (c. 1936–2020)

Ronnie Wavehill also known as Ronnie Wavehill Wirrpngayarri Jangala (c. 1936 – 20 May 2020) was a Gurindji stockman who was born at Wave Hill Station, Northern Territory, Australia. He took part in the Wave Hill walk-off and he was a cultural storyteller, Indigenous cultural informant and singer.

== Life in the Northern Territory ==
Wavehill was the son of Cracker Jarluyarri Jampin and Mariah Yakngarri Nangari and was one of seven children. He many years of his early childhood travelling through Gurinji Country, and further afield, with his grandparents by foot. They would travel hundreds of kilometres to follow seasonal ceremonial gatherings and connect with Country and Countrymen. This time with them, who were elders among his people, gave him Gurindji language proficiency significantly higher than many of his peers.

It was on one of the trips that Wavehill learnt the Wanjiwanji (Laka) songs that he brought to Wave Hill Station. This song came from Yawulyurru Tjapangarti, a Pintupi songman, and he shared it with dozens of language groups with the lyrics remaining unchanged. Wavehill remembers sharing this song and says if it:

With some to-do, I got up there and stood up in front of everyone. They had me stand up there in the middle to sing … All the Gurindji were amazed at me: they’d never seen such a small boy sing without shame. All the mob from the west were egging me on, ‘Go on, Jangala!’

— Ronnie Wavehill, Songs from the stations : Wajarra, 2019

In 1945, when Wavehill was 10 years old, Ronald and Catherine Berndt arrived for a visit to Wave Hill Station and reported the inhumane working and living conditions of the Aboriginal people living there; additionally they noted that children under 12, like Wavehill, were employed illegally as stockmen.

Wavehill continued working as a stockman, for no pay, until the Wave Hill walk-off, where he and his people protested not only their living and working conditions but also began their fight for Land Rights.

After the successful strike Wavehill worked as a rubbish collector for the Daguragu and Kalkarindji local councils.

In the 1990s Wavehill began working with linguists, including Erika Charola and Felicity Meakins, and other researchers to share his knowledge of Gurinji language and culture. To do this he often worked alongside other Elders to produce publications. He was also a contributor to Native Title proceedings and Aboriginal Lands Trusts activities throughout the region.

Wavehill was also an informant regarding numerous massacres of Aboriginal people which had been recounted to him by previous generations; one of the names provided was Owen Cummins who he identified as someone who, in the "eearly days", had shot Aboriginal people the Wave Hill Station Massacre/s between 1920 and 1922.

Wavehill was quoted as saying of the Blackfellows Knob Massacre, at Tartarr, that:

‘The ngumpin [Aboriginal people who had been butchering a beast] ran away southwards, away from Tartarr. They went downstream a bit and then out across the rocks. The kartiya [whitefellas] were chasing them on horseback, galloping like mad. The ngumpin stopped there in the dry creek and hooked up their spears. “Don’t go”, the kartiya boss was saying. “Don’t get close otherwise we’ll get speared.” They were frightened of the ngumpin. The horsemen never caught up to them, so a lot of them got away. A horse can gallop but those ngumpin were very good runners’.

— Ronnie Wavehill, Yijarni : true stories from Gurindji country, 2016

Although he remembered past atrocities he did not generalise his opinion of kartiya (non-Indigenous people) and he said that there "were bad kartiya and good kartiya, bad ngumpin (Aboriginal people) and good ngumpin.

Wavehill died on 20 May 2020 on Gurinji Country and it was noted that his Dreaming was the Ngapa (Rain) Dreaming and it rained for three days on Gurinji Country after his death.

== Select publications ==
- Bilinarra, Gurindji and Malngin Plants and Animals (2012)
- Gurindji to English Dictionary (2013)
- Yijarni: True Stories from Gurindji Country (2016)
- Mayarni-kari Yurrk: More Stories from Gurindji Country (2016)

For a full list see AustLit.

== Legacy ==
Wavehill was quoted by Pat Dodson in his censure motion against Fraser Anning following the Christchurch mosque shootings in New Zealand.
