= Bill Tapp =

- Born: Charles William Tapp; 2 June 1929; Sydney
- Occupation: Pastoralist
- Spouse: June Clements (nee Forscutt)
- Children: 10
- Parent(s): Earnest Charles Tapp and Sarah Ann

Charles William Tapp, best known as Bill Tapp (2 June 1929 – 22 May 1992), was a pioneer and cattleman from Killarney Station in the Northern Territory of Australia.

== Early life ==
Tapp was born in Sydney on 2 June 1929 and grew up in Vaucluse. His father was Earnest Charles Tapp, a radio technician in the Australian Navy and his mother was Sarah Ann (Sadie), a managing director of Rosenthal Australia – a German-owned department store in George Street, Sydney. He was an only child.

Tapp lived in a house with a tennis court and a maid during the 1930s and later became a full-time boarder at the Scots College in Bellevue Hill. A champion sportsman and scholar, he represented his school in many sports, swimming, cricket, football, rowing, diving and played tennis at a state level. It is said that he played with, and against, Australian tennis champions Lew Hoad and Frank Sedgman.

He was known to be agonisingly shy and had a pronounced stutter.

While at Scots College, Tapp read the Ion Idriess book 'Cattle King' about Sir Sidney Kidman who owned large cattle stations in the Northern Territory. The book had a lasting effect on him and he decided that as soon as he finished school he would become a cattleman. His mother Sadie secured a job as a jackeroo-bookkeeper on Elsey Station near the tiny township of Mataranka 400 kilometres south of Darwin, made famous by the book We of the Never Never.

Tapp settled into station life learning everything he could. He left Elsey Station a few years later to manage Rosewood Station on the Northern Territory-Western Australian border. Two years later he established a droving business in the early 1950s, moving cattle from Alice Springs through Tennant Creek and Elliott along the Murranji Track.

In 1952 Bill Tapp and business partner Bill Crowson bought Montejinni Station. With Crowson's family, the business partners transported all their worldly possessions and their plant of horses up the Murranji to Montejinni. With them was Aboriginal stockman and a young sixteen year old deaf man, Kenny Wesley. Simultaneously, Paul and Mick Vandeleur acquired Camfield Station and Leo Izod and Ivor Townshend Hall drew Killarney Station. These names formed the initials for the brands of CTT for Montejinni and ITH for Killarney.

Following a breakdown in the relationship with the Crowsons, Bill Tapp began talks with Izod and Hall about buying Killarney Station and reached an agreement in 1960 to pay £90,000, a Northern Territory record price for a cattle station at that time. He received title to Killarney in 1962.

== The Cattle King ==
Tapp's empire at Killarney Station began under a bough shed at Mayvale Bore with a sign swinging off a post saying "COCKRAG DOWNS' (Toni Tapp Coutts states that 'Cockrag' means "broken down and uncared for"). His first stock camp consisted of brothers Jim Forscutt and Boko Forscutt, Joey and Alfie Russell, and Kenny Wesley. He worked tirelessly, mustering and building fences to contain the wild cattle. They lived on salted beef and black tea.

Tapp met his future wife June Clements (née Forscutt), a divorcee with three small children Billy, Shing and Toni (Toni Tapp Coutts: who would later become his biographer), while staying at her mother's house in Katherine. After their first meeting, Tapp stated that he wanted to marry her. The courtship was short and sweet and June soon found herself out at Killarney Station living under a bough shed, a structure made from four tree posts with fencing wire slung across the top and branches thrown over to make shade. The bough shed was the kitchen, the office and doctors surgery. On 2 August 1962, Tapp wrote in his diary, 'Day off – got married today'. Bill and June Tapp went on to have seven more children, Sam, Joe, Ben, William, Caroline, Daniel and Kate.

Tapp went on to purchase Maryfield Station, Roper Valley Station and Mountain Valley Station.

== Later life ==
Bill Tapp and June divorced in 1985. After years of mismanagement by agricultural company Elders, the Tapp family properties went into receivership in 1991. All three properties owned by the Tapps were advertised for sale. After a battle in the Northern Territory Supreme Court between the Tapps and Elders, Killarney Station and Maryfield Station were sold, but the Tapps were permitted to retain Roper Valley Station.

Tapp died on 23 May 1992 in his own bed on Killarney Station at the age of 62. He was buried at the station on 3 June. A plaque on his grave reads:

Killarney stands as a monument to his vision and contribution to the Northern Territory horse and cattle industry.

Tapp's legacy was recognised by being inducted into the Australian Stockmen's Hall of Fame with his proud children accepting the award on his behalf.
