= Edna Jessop =

Australian drover

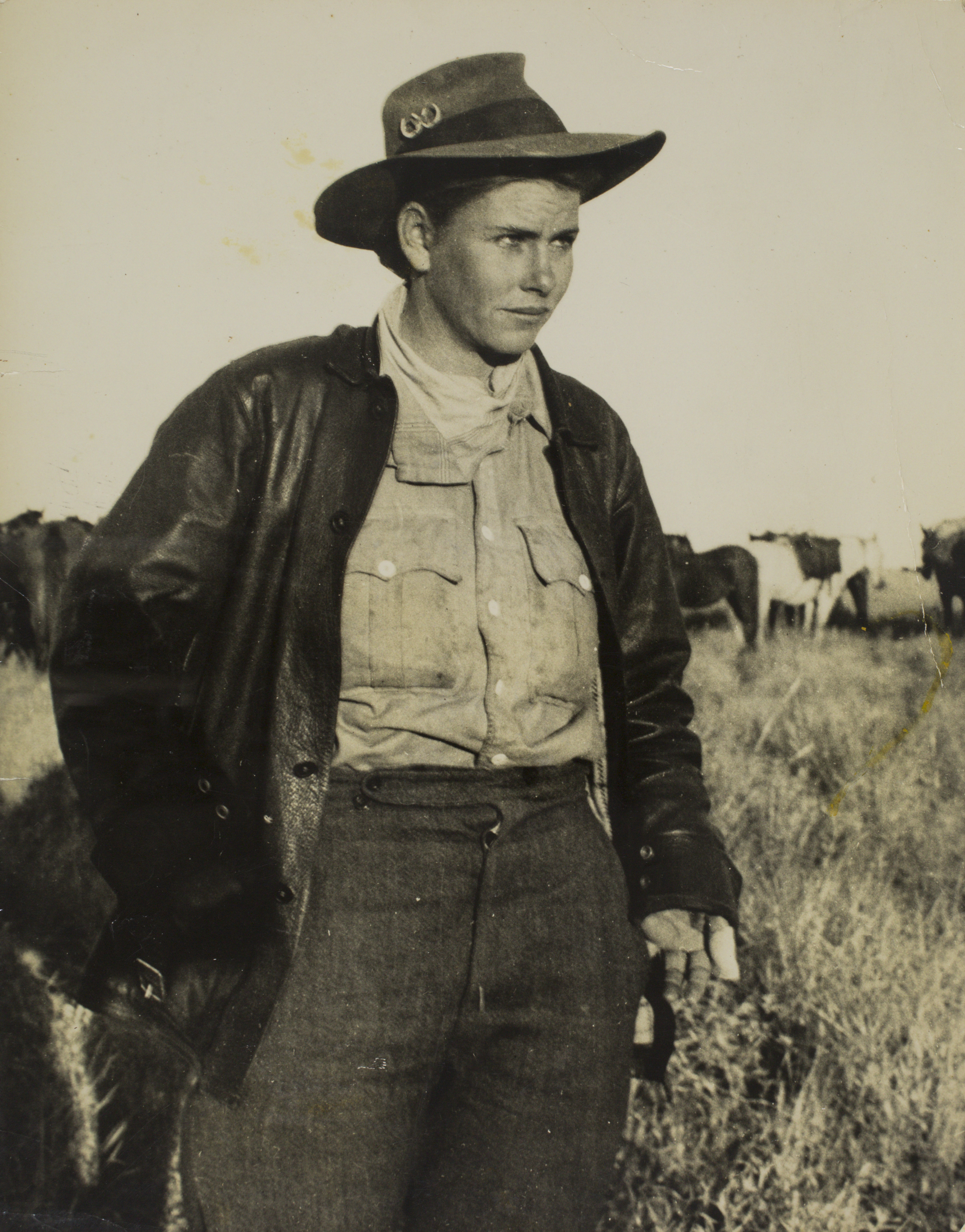
Edna Zigenbine in 1950

Edna Jessop née Zigenbine, is most often remembered as Edna Zigenbine (10 October 1926 – 15 September 2007) is considered to be the first female to lead a droving team in 1950 and often referred to as a "Boss Drover".

== Biography ==
Edna Jessop was born Edna Zigenbine to a family of drovers who worked largely along the stock routes of northern Australia in Western Queensland, the Northern Territory and the north of Western Australia. Her father was Harry Zigenbine and she was the second daughter and third eldest child in a family of eight children. The children had no formal education but their mother taught them to read and write.

Jessop made headlines in Australia and internationally in 1950 when she was called upon to take over the delivery by droving of 1,550 bullocks from Bedford Downs Station in Western Australia to Dajarra, Queensland, via the Murranji Track, when her father Harry could no longer continue riding. This was a distance of 2,240 kilometres.

It is not known why her father could no longer continue droving with reports varying; some state that he became ill and others that he fell from a horse. Ted Egan believed that he was incapacitated after a bar fight at Newcastle Waters. It is, however, clear that Zigenbine was transported to the hospital at Tennant Creek.

The local postmaster sent photos of Jessop and her team to national newspapers before they left Newcastle Waters, which resulted in significant media attention for the remainder of the journey. The media wanted to interview Jessop as she was an attractive, 23-year-old woman who was an experienced drover.

She arrived in Dajarra after a six-month journey without stock losses and, on her return to Tennant Creek, was greeted warmly by the town and a number of press. Following the trip a member of the press took her to Darwin, Northern Territory to see the sea for the first time. Jessop was amazed by the "all that water" and the appearance that it was all going to waste.

Following this trip she returned to the job she had held previously, as a wards-maid (sometimes reported as waitress) at the Tennant Creek Hospital.

Jessop married John Jessop in 1952, also a drover. She moved to the Mount Isa area in 1960 after their separation and later divorce (due to John's drinking) to ensure an education for her son, Jack. There she worked for the Mount Isa City Council along with a variety of other jobs.

She was featured in a 1981 article in The Australian Women's Weekly who called her "[t]he woman who mastered the Outback".

Jessop died on 15 September 2007 at the age of 80 at Mount Isa Hospital after a short battle with cancer. She was buried with her bridle and her hat.

She is listed on the Australian Stockman's Hall of Fame.

== Songs ==
There are two songs written about Jessop:

- Edna by Ted Egan
- Give my regards to Edna by Stan Coster; sung by Slim Dusty
