= Swag (bedroll) =

Portable sleeping unit

One of the many ways to set up some brands of commercial, modern swags

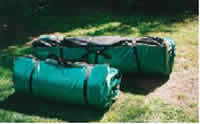
Rolled modern commercial swags

In Australia, a swag is a portable sleeping unit. It is normally a bundle of belongings rolled in a traditional fashion to be carried by a foot traveller in the bush. Before motor transport was common, foot travel over long distances was essential to agriculture in the Australian bush. It is sometimes referred to as a "backpack bed". Swags have been carried by shearers, miners, the unemployed, and many others, some of whom would have been happy to have been called swagmen and some not.

== History ==
In the early 1800s, the term swag was used by British thieves to describe any amount of stolen goods. One definition given in Francis Grose's 1811 Dictionary of the Vulgar Tongue is "any booty you have lately obtained,.... To carry the swag is to be the bearer of the stolen goods to a place of safety." James Hardy Vaux, a convict in Australia, used the term for similar purposes in his memoirs written in 1812 and published in 1819. By the 1830s, the term in Australia had transferred from meaning goods acquired by a thief to the possessions and daily necessaries carried by a bushman. The compound swagman and colloquial variation swaggie first appeared in the 1850s during the Australian gold rushes, alongside less common terms such as bundleman. New Zealanders adopted the term in the 1880s, where swagmen were also known as swaggers. Swagger also originated in Australia, but became obsolete there by the 1890s.

== Modern use ==
In Australia, the term swag is widely used to refer to a portable shelter used for camping or outdoor sleeping that acts as tent, sleeping bag and mattress combined in a single item. Originally designed to be carried by bush travellers on foot, the modern swag has grown in both size and weight and is intended for campers travelling with a vehicle.

The modern swag is a waterproof canvas sleeping compartment that is sometimes insect-proof. Swags include a mattress (usually high-density foam, 50 or 75 mm thick). When rolled up the swag is relatively lightweight and compact, making it ideal for storage and transport. It is typically easy to erect, and roll up can be done quickly. Swags are still heavily used in Australia, by overlanders. There are still a large number of manufacturers actively making both standard and custom-design swags. The modern swag is designed for robustness and is marketed towards those travelling by vehicle – they are too heavy (10–20kg) and bulky to be transported long distances on foot. Bushwalkers and hikers would use conventional lightweight tents and sleeping bags. More recently, several camping supply firms have produced readymade bedrolls along the pattern of the original swag.

1. a bundle or roll carried across the shoulders or otherwise, and containing the bedding and personal belongings of a traveller through the bush, a miner, etc.; shiralee; bluey; drum: *I got my rug and rolled it up into a swag, putting the remains of the bread and butter inside. –A.B. FACEY, 1981.

2. a pack of personal belongings.

3. The Australian Swag, as defined in the past, is a portable sleeping unit. It is normally a bundle of belongings rolled in a traditional fashion to be carried by a foot traveler in the bush. Before motor transport was common, foot travel over long distances was essential to agriculture in the Australian bush.

== See also ==
- Bindle
- Bivouac sack
- Cowboy bedroll
- Sleeping pad
- Swagman
- Tent
