= Killarney Station =

Pastoral lease in the Northern Territory

Coordinates: 16.257°S 131.751°E

Location in Northern Territory

Killarney Station is a pastoral lease that operates as a cattle station in the Victoria River District of the Northern Territory of Australia. The property is situated approximately 150 kilometres (93 mi) south east of Timber Creek and 430 kilometres (267 mi) south of Darwin.

== History ==
Killarney Station was established by Eric Izod with managing partner Ivor Hall in 1953.

Bill Tapp purchased Killarney following talks with Izod and Hall about buying Killarney Station in 1960. Tapp paid £90,000, a Northern Territory record price for a cattle station at that time. He received title to Killarney in 1962.

The Tapp family properties, including Killarney Station, went into receivership in 1991. Brian Oxenford's Western Grazing Company purchased the property.

Wallco acquired Killarney in 2001 from Western Grazing Company. The property was being run in conjunction with neighbouring Birrimba Station, forming an aggregation with an area of 5,515 square kilometres (2,129 sq mi) that was supporting a herd of 41,000 Brahman cattle.

In 2012 the property was run by Wallco Pastoral Company until it was placed in receivership by the National Australia Bank before a refinancing.

Killarney was sold in 2014 to the Jumbuck Pastoral Company for about A$35 million. At the time it occupied an area of 2,819 km^{2} (1,088 sq mi).

Most of Birrimba and a small portion of Killarney were burnt out by a bushfire in 2014.

== See also ==
- List of ranches and stations
