= Nathaniel Buchanan =

Australian pioneer pastoralist, drover and explorer

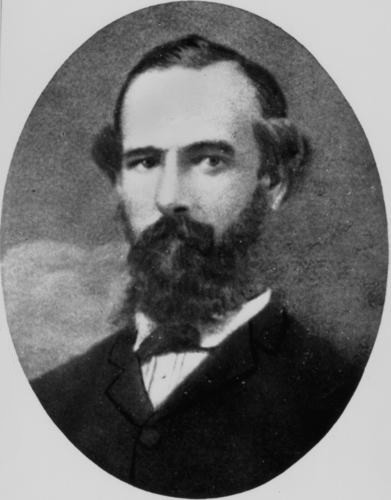
Nat Buchanan, pioneer, pastoralist and explorer.

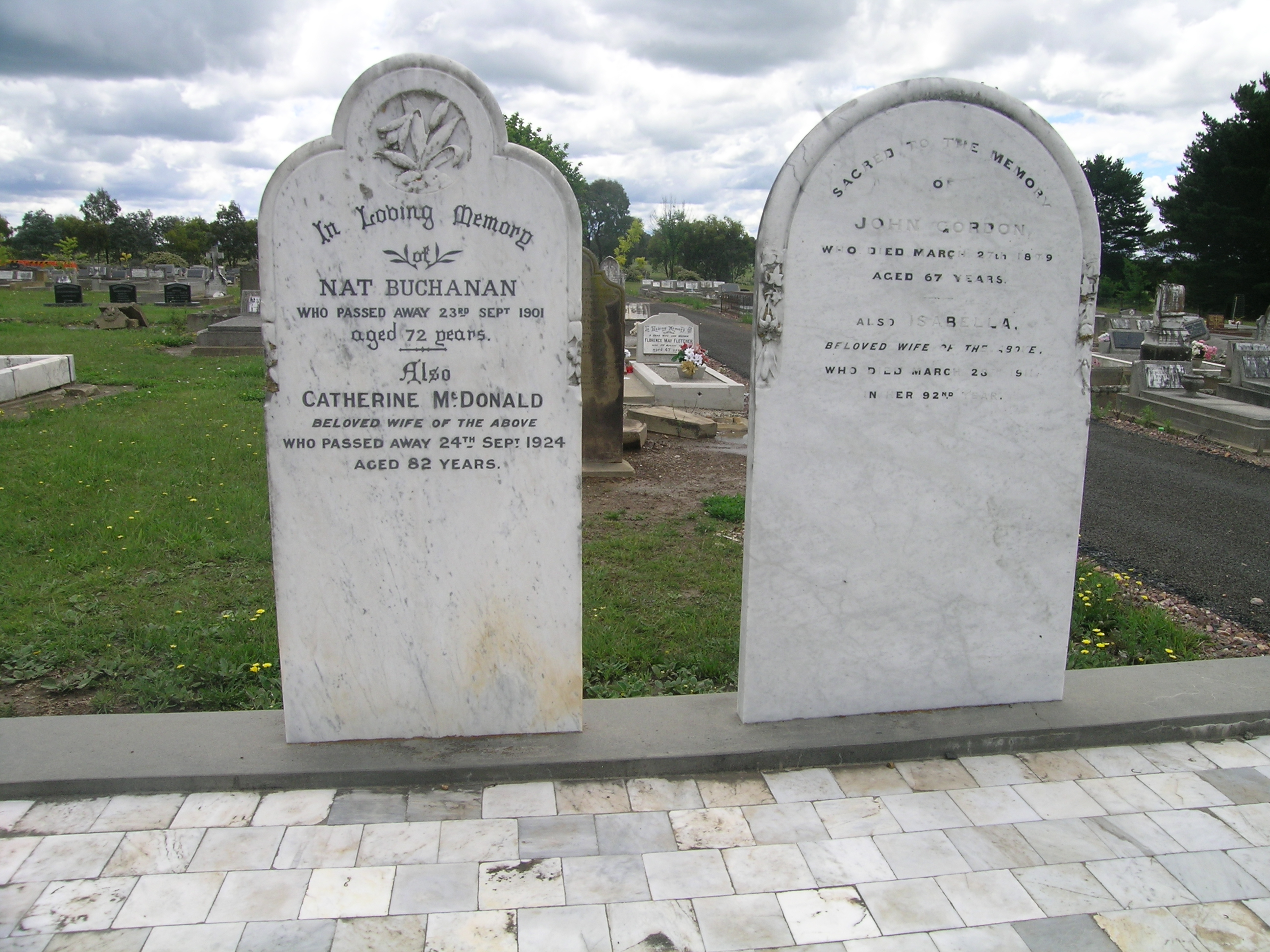
Headstone on Nat Buchanan's grave, Walcha, NSW

Nathaniel Buchanan (1826 – 23 September 1901) was an Australian pioneer pastoralist, drover and explorer.

== Early life ==
Buchanan was born near Dublin, and was of Scottish descent the son of Lieutenant Charles Henry Buchanan, and his wife Annie, née White.

== Career ==
In 1859 Buchanan explored new country with William Landsborough.

Buchanan made several explorations inland from Bowen Downs, including securing land near Burketown, Queensland.

Buchanan was also noted for his overlanding feats including droving 20,000 head of cattle from Queensland to Glencoe Station.

Nat was buried in the general cemetery at Walcha, New South Wales.

== Legacy ==
His brother William had also been a significant pastoralist pioneer.
