= Nikki Webster discography =

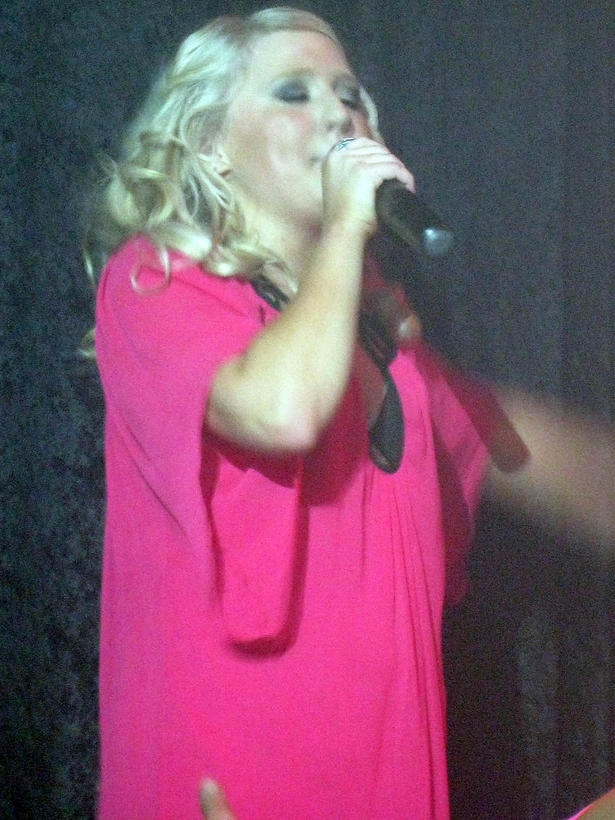
- Nikki Webster performing on 13 July 2008
- Studio albums: 4
- Compilation albums: 1
- Singles: 10
- Music videos: 10

Nikki Webster is an Australian pop singer. She has released four studio albums, one compilation album and nine singles, in addition to ten music videos on record labels Gotham Records and Piller Records.

Webster rose to prominence after performing at the opening ceremony of the 2000 Summer Olympics. Her debut studio album, Follow Your Heart, was released in 2001. The album peaked at number five on the Australian Top 100 Albums Chart and received platinum certification by the Australian Recording Industry Association. The lead single "Strawberry Kisses" peaked at number two on the Australian Top 100 Singles Chart and received platinum certification. The album's subsequent singles "Depend on Me" and "The Best Days" reached numbers 16 and 21, respectively. The following year, Webster released her second studio album, Bliss. The album peaked at number 16 and received gold certification. The lead single "Something More Beautiful" reached number 13 and received gold certification. Webster released her third studio album, Let's Dance, in 2004. The album failed to achieve the commercial success of her previous albums, peaking at number 46. The lead single "Dancing in the Street" reached number 19. Later that year, she released a compilation album, The Best of Nikki Webster. The album peaked at number 84. As of February 2008, Webster is working on her fourth studio album. The lead single "Devilicious" reached number 78.

== Albums ==
=== Studio albums ===
List of studio albums, with selected details, chart positions and certifications
Title	Album details	Peak chart positions	Certifications
Title	Album details	AUS	Certifications
Follow Your Heart	Released: 20 August 2001; Format: CD, CS, DLD; Label: Gotham	5	ARIA: Platinum
Bliss	Released: 28 October 2002; Format: CD, CS, DLD; Label: Gotham	16	ARIA: Gold
Let's Dance	Released: 21 June 2004; Format: CD, DLD; Label: Gotham	46	
Girls	Released: 17 July 2020; Format: Digital download, streaming; Label: MIB	—	

=== Compilation albums ===
List of compilation albums, with selected details and chart positions
Title	Album details	Peak chart positions
Title	Album details	AUS
The Best of Nikki Webster	Released: 29 November 2004; Format: CD, DLD; Label: Gotham (#04062)	84

== Singles ==
List of singles, with selected chart positions
Year	Title	Peak chart positions					Certifications	Album
Year	Title	AUS	BEL	NLD	NZ	UK	Certifications	Album
2000	"We'll Be One" (with Sing 2001 Choir)	19	—	—	—	—	ARIA: Gold	Non-album single
2001	"Strawberry Kisses"	2	44	58	40	64	ARIA: Platinum	Follow Your Heart
2001	"Depend on Me"	16	—	—	—	—	ARIA: Gold	Follow Your Heart
2001	"The Best Days"	21	—	—	—	—		Follow Your Heart
2002	"Something More Beautiful"	13	—	—	—	—	ARIA: Gold	Bliss
2002	"24/7 (Crazy 'Bout Your Smile)"	19	—	—	—	—		Bliss
2003	"Dancing in the Street"	19	—	—	—	—		Let's Dance
2004	"Let's Dance"	37	—	—	—	—		Let's Dance
2009	"Devilicious"	78	—	—	—	—		Non-album single
2017	"Strawberry Kisses 2017" (featuring Sam Mac)	97	—	—	—	—		Non-album single
"—" denotes releases that did not chart.

== Music videos ==
Year	Title
2000	"We'll Be One"
2001	"Strawberry Kisses"
2001	"Depend on Me"
2001	"The Best Days"
2002	"Something More Beautiful"
2002	"24/7 (Crazy 'Bout Your Smile)"
2003	"I Wan'na Be Like You"
2003	"Dancing in the Street"
2004	"Let's Dance"
2009	"Devilicious"
