= The Best of Nikki Webster =

Greatest hits album by Nikki Webster
- Released: 29 November 2004
- Recorded: 2000–2004
- Genre: Pop
- Label: Gotham
- Producer: Richard Brobyn

Nikki Webster chronology
Let's Dance (2004)	The Best of Nikki Webster (2004)	Girls (2020)

The Best of Nikki Webster is the fourth album by Australian singer Nikki Webster released in Australia on 29 November 2004 (see 2004 in music) by Gotham Records. It is a compilation album: CD 1 is a collection of Webster's hits from 2000 to 2004, while the DVD is a collection of her music videos and live performances. It reached the ARIA Albums Chart top 100.

== Track listing ==
- CD
1. "Strawberry Kisses" – 3:34
2. "We'll Be One" – 4:13
3. "24/7 (Crazy 'Bout Your Smile)" – 3:17
4. "The Best Days" – 3:38
5. "Over the Rainbow" – 3:02
6. "I Wanna Be Like You (the Monkey Song)" – 2:50
7. "I Sing for You" – 3:36
8. "Depend on Me" – 4:10
9. "Let's Dance" – 3:58
10. "Something More Beautiful" – 3:32
11. "Follow Your Heart" – 3:51
12. "Under Southern Skies" – 2:26
13. "Dancing in the Street" – 3:53
14. "Don’t Give Up" – 3:45
- DVD
1. "Strawberry Kisses" – 3:37
2. "We'll Be One" – 4:10
3. "24/7 (Crazy 'Bout Your Smile)" – 3:22
4. "The Best Days" – 3:54
5. "I Wanna Be Like You (the Monkey Song)" – 2:51
6. "Depend on Me" – 3:57
7. "Let's Dance" – 4:00
8. "Something More Beautiful" – 3:32
9. "Dancing in the Street" – 3:46
10. "Under Southern Skies" (live at Australia Day Concert 2004) – 3:33
11. "Let's Dance" (live at Australia Day Concert 2004) – 4:10
12. "Something More Beautiful" (behind the scenes) – 2:37
13. "Dancing in the Street" (behind the scenes) – 3:38
14. Photo Gallery – 2:36
15. "Follow Your Heart" (documentary) – 4:57

== Charts ==
Chart performance for The Best of Nikki Webster
Chart (2004)	Peak position
Australian Albums (ARIA)	84
