= Let's Dance =

Let's Dance may refer to:

== Music ==
=== Albums ===
- Let's Dance (David Bowie album), 1983
- Let's Dance (Nikki Webster album), 2004
- Let's Dance! (Sharon, Lois & Bram album), 1995
- Let's Dance, an album by U'redu, featuring Magnifico, 1992

=== Songs ===
- "Let's Dance" (9th Creation song), 1979
- "Let's Dance" (Benny Goodman song), 1935
- "Let's Dance" (Chris Montez song), 1962
- "Let's Dance" (Chris Rea song), 1987
- "Let's Dance" (David Bowie song), 1983
- "Let's Dance" (Five song), 2001
- "Let's Dance" (Nikki Webster song), 2004
- "Let's Dance" (Vanessa Hudgens song), 2006
- "Hot Stuff (Let's Dance)", by Craig David, 2007
- "Let's Dance", by the Balham Alligators, 1987
- "Let's Dance", by Hawk Nelson from Hawk Nelson Is My Friend, 2008
- "Let's Dance", by LP & JC from the StreetDance 3D soundtrack, 2010
- "Let's Dance", by Miley Cyrus from Hannah Montana 2: Meet Miley Cyrus, 2007
- "Let's Dance", by Sara Evans from Born to Fly, 2000
- "Let's Dance", by Shimica Wong from The Way We Dance soundtrack, 2013

== Film, television, and radio ==
- Let's Dance (radio), a 1934–35 NBC radio program
- Let's Dance (1950 film), a musical starring Betty Hutton and Fred Astaire
- Let's Dance (2007 film) (Faut que ça danse!), a French-Swiss film
- Let's Dance (2009 film), a Bollywood film
- Balla con noi - Let's Dance, an Italian film
- Let's Dance (2019 film), a French film
- Dancing with the Stars, a dance competition TV program known as Let's Dance in Germany, Slovakia and Sweden
  - Let's Dance (German TV series), the German version of Dancing with the Stars
  - Let's Dance (Slovak TV series), the Slovak version of Dancing with the Stars
  - Let's Dance (Swedish TV series), the Swedish version of Dancing with the Stars
- Let's Dance (UK TV series), a British fundraising competition
- Let's Dance (Australian TV series), 1957 Australian instructional series
- "Let's Dance" (Northern Exposure), a 1995 television episode
- The Raccoons: Let's Dance!, 1984 TV special of The Raccoons

== Other uses ==
- Let's Dance, a segment of 1theK Originals
