= Bliss (Nikki Webster album) =

Studio album by Nikki Webster
- Released: 28 October 2002
- Recorded: 2002
- Genres: Pop; teen pop; bubblegum pop
- Length: 44:41
- Label: BMG/Gotham
- Producer: Chong Lim

Nikki Webster chronology
Follow Your Heart (2001)	Bliss (2002)	Let's Dance (2004)

Singles from Follow Your Heart
- 1. "Something More Beautiful" Released: 29 July 2002; 2. "24/7 (Crazy 'Bout Your Smile)" Released: 14 October 2002

Bliss is the second studio album by Australian pop singer, Nikki Webster. It was released in Australia on 28 October 2002 (see 2002 in music) through BMG/Gotham Records. Bliss was recorded in one week, earlier that year. Nikki said:" My voice (in Bliss) has aged since Follow Your Heart." The album peaked at No. 16 on the ARIA Albums Chart.

An early version of Bliss included a bonus DVD featuring the music videos for "Strawberry Kisses", "Depend on Me", "The Best Days", "Something More Beautiful" and "24/7 (Crazy 'Bout Your Smile)".

== Track listing ==
1. "24/7 (Crazy 'Bout Your Smile)" (Daniel Eklund, Paul Rein) – 3:17
2. "Something More Beautiful" (Johan Åberg, Rein) – 3:31
3. "Mmm...I Like!" (Åberg, Rein) – 3:19
4. "Never Been Kissed" (Pelle Ankarberg, Jodi Marr, Niclas Molinder, Joacim Persson) – 3:47
5. "To Have to Let Go" (Chris Braide, Emma Bunton, Andrew Frampton) – 4:15
6. "I Think I Do" (Janski, Lars Johansen) – 3:23
7. "Perfect Bliss" (Jörgen Elofsson, Phil Thornalley) – 3:58
8. "Positivity" (Henrik Åhlgren, Jo Evans) – 3:07
9. "Miracle of You" (Jeff Franzel, Andrew Fromm, Sandy Linzer) – 4:28
10. "I Sing for You" (Martin Briley, Dana Calitri, Andy Marvel) – 3:32
11. "Only When I Need You" (Åberg, Rein, Winston Sela) – 4:27
12. "Fairytale Believer" (Franzel, Marjorie Maye, Andy Snitzer) – 3:37
- DVD
1. "Strawberry Kisses"
2. "Depend on Me"
3. "The Best Days"
4. "Something More Beautiful"
5. "24/7 (Crazy 'Bout Your Smile)"

== Charts ==
=== Weekly charts ===
Chart (2002)	Peak position
Australian Albums (ARIA)	16

=== Year-end charts ===
Chart (2002)	Position
Australian Albums (ARIA)	99

== Certifications ==
Region	Certification	Shipment
Australia ARIA	Gold	35,000+
