= PYT =

PYT or P.Y.T. may refer to:

- "P.Y.T. (Pretty Young Thing)", a song by Michael Jackson
- P.Y.T. (band), a Florida-based girl group
- PYT (Down with Me), an album by P.Y.T.
- "P.Y.T. (Pretty Young Thing)", an episode in season 7 of the television show Grey's Anatomy
- Pyongyang Time (PYT) (UTC+09:00)

== See also ==
- "My PYT", a song by Wale
- Pretty Young Thing (disambiguation)
