= List of most watched United States television broadcasts of 2000 =

The following is a list of most watched United States television broadcasts of 2000.

== Most watched by week ==
Broadcast (primetime only)
Week of	Title	Network	Viewers (in millions)	Ref.
May 8	ER	NBC	32.67	
May 15	ER	NBC	34.59	
May 22	Spin City	ABC	32.76	
May 29	Who Wants to Be a Millionaire (Thurs)	ABC	23.83	
June 5	Who Wants to Be a Millionaire (Sun)	ABC	26.27	
June 12	Who Wants to Be a Millionaire (Tues)	ABC	23.84	
June 19	Survivor	CBS	24.22	
June 26	Survivor	CBS	23.98	
July 3	Survivor	CBS	24.49	
July 10	Survivor	CBS	24.50	
July 17	Survivor	CBS	26.15	
July 24	Survivor	CBS	27.18	
July 31	Survivor	CBS	27.41	
August 7	Survivor	CBS	28.00	
August 14	Survivor	CBS	28.67	
August 21	Survivor	CBS	51.69	
August 28	Who Wants to Be a Millionaire (Tues)	ABC	21.72	
September 4	Who Wants to Be a Millionaire (Tues)	ABC	23.26	
September 11	2000 Summer Olympics opening ceremony	NBC	27.27	
September 18	2000 Summer Olympics (Sun)	NBC	25.91	
September 25	2000 Summer Olympics (Mon)	NBC	24.42	
October 2	The West Wing	NBC	25.05	
October 9	ER	NBC	29.33	
October 16	ER	NBC	18.44	
October 23	Frasier	NBC	28.64	
October 30	ER	NBC	27.81	
November 6	ER	NBC	28.40	
November 13	ER	NBC	31.03	
November 20	ER	NBC	25.79	
November 27	Who Wants to Be a Millionaire (Wed)	ABC	22.09	
December 4	ER	NBC	28.08	
December 11	ER	NBC	29.84	
December 18	Monday Night Football	ABC	22.32	
December 25	Who Wants to Be a Millionaire (Tues)	ABC	18.94	
