= Little Things =

Little Things or The Little Thing or variation, may refer to:

== Music ==
=== Albums ===
- Little Things (Sylver album), 2003
- Little Things (Toby Lightman album), 2004
- Little Things (Jeannie Seely album), 1968
- Little Things, a 2004 album by Hanne Hukkelberg
- Little Things, a 2011 album from C418 discography

=== Songs ===
- "Little Things" (ABBA song), 2021
- "Little Things" (Bobby Goldsboro song), 1964
- "Little Things" (Bush song), 1995
- "Little Things" (Ella Mai song), 2024
- "Little Things" (Good Charlotte song), 2001
- "Little Things" (India Arie song), 2002
- "Little Things" (Jessica Mauboy song), 2019
- Little Things (Kevin Jonas song), 2026
- "Little Things" (Marty Stuart song), 1991
- "Little Things" (One Direction song), 2012
- "Little Things" (Tanya Tucker song), 1997
- "Little Things" (The Oak Ridge Boys song), 1985
- "Little Things", by Big Thief, 2021
- "Little Things", by Jeannie Seely, 1968; off the album Little Things (Jeannie Seely album)
- "Little Things", by Sylver, 2003; off the album Little Things (Sylver album)
- "Little Things", by Ziggy Ramo and Paul Kelly, 2021
- "Little Thing", by Toby Lightman, 2004; off the album Little Things (Toby Lightman album)
- "The Little Things" (Colbie Caillat song), 2008
- "The Little Things" (Kelsea Ballerini song), 2022
- "The Little Things", by I.N; off the album SKZ-Replay 2026 Pt.1, 2026

== Film ==
- Little Things (film), 2014
- The Little Things (2021 film), a crime thriller film by John Lee Hancock
- The Little Things (2010 film), an Australian indie film
- The Little Thing (1938 film), a French drama film
- The Little Thing (1923 film), a French silent film

== Literature ==
- Little Things (novel), a 2002 novel in the Buffy the Vampire Slayer series
- "Little Things" (poem), a 1845 poem by Julia Abigail Fletcher Carney
- "Little Things" (short story), a short story by Raymond Carver

== Other uses ==
- LittleThings, a digital media firm
- Little Things (video game), a 2010 iOS game by KLICKTOCK
- Little Things (TV series), a 2016 Indian Netflix series
- "Little Things" (Doctors), a 2001 television episode

== See also ==
- "All of the Little Things", a 2021 song by Winston Surfshirt featuring Ramirez
- "Littlest Things", a 2006 song by Lily Allen
- "Dirty Little Thing", a 2004 Velvet Revolver song off the album Contraband
- Pretty Little Thing (disambiguation)
