= Pretty Young Thing (disambiguation) =

Pretty Young Thing or variant, may refer to:

- An attractive person

== Songs, singles, 45 records ==
- "P.Y.T. (Pretty Young Thing)", a 1982 song by Michael Jackson off the album Thriller
- "Pretty Young Thing", a 2002 song by B2K off the album Pandemonium! (album)
- "Pretty Young Thing", a single by Stella Soleil, later covered by Lene Nystrom
- "Pretty Young Thing", a 2004 single by Lene Nystrøm featuring a cover of the Stella Soleil song
- "Pretty Young Thing", a 2005 song by Tina Cousins off the album Mastermind (Tina Cousins album)
- "Pretty Young Things", a Bodyrox song from the soundtrack of the 2010 film 4.3.2.1.

== Groups, organizations ==
- P.Y.T. (band) (1998-2002), a Florida-based girl group variously rendered as "Pretty Young Thing", "Pretty Young Things" and "Prove Yourself True"; named after the Michael Jackson song
- Pretty Young Things (1983-1985), a pro-wrestling tag team; named after the Michael Jackson song

== Other uses ==
- Pretty Young Thing, a 2005 poetry collection by Danielle Pafunda
- "P.Y.T. (Pretty Young Thing)" (Grey's Anatomy), a 2011 episode in season 7 of the television show Grey's Anatomy

== See also ==
- PYT (disambiguation)
- Pretty Thing (disambiguation)
- Pretty Things (disambiguation)
- Pretty Little Thing (disambiguation)
