= Dirty Pretty Things =

Dirty Pretty Things may refer to:

== Music ==
- Dirty Pretty Things (band), a band formed in the United Kingdom in 2005, by two former members of The Libertines
- Dirty Pretty Things (album), a 2019 album by Delaney Jane
- Dirty Pretty Things (record label), a record label founded by Delaney Jane

== Other uses ==
- Dirty Pretty Things (film), a 2002 film
- Dirty Pretty Things (lingerie label), a clothing brand that won one of the UK Lingerie Awards in 2012 for new designer

== See also ==
- "Dirty Little Thing", a 2004 Velvet Revolver song off the album Contraband
- Pretty Things (disambiguation)
