= Pretty Little Thing =

Pretty Little Thing or variant, may refer to:

- An attractive person
- A desirable object

== Music ==
- "Pretty Little Thing" (will.i.am song), a 2019 non-album single by will.i.am
- "Pretty Little Thing" (Ashanti song), a 2019 non-album single by Ashanti
- "Pretty Little Thing" (Courtney Hadwin song), a 2019 song by Courtney Hadwin
- "Pretty Little Thing" (Blackchords song), a 2010 single by Blackchords
- "Pretty Little Thing" (DJ Green Lantern song), a 2010 song off the 2010 Styles P album The Green Ghost Project
- "Pretty Little Thing" (Fink song), a 2006 single off the album Biscuits for Breakfast by Fink
- "Pretty Little Thing" (Cold Chisel song), a 1998 song by Cold Chisel off the album The Last Wave of Summer
- "Pretty Little Things" (Shriekback song), a 1986 song by Shriekback off the album Big Night Music
- "Pretty Little Thing" (The Deepest Blue song), a song released on the Where the Action Is! Los Angeles Nuggets: 1965–1968
- "Pretty Little Thing" (Doug Bragg song), a 1958 song and record by Doug Bragg
- "Pretty Little Thing" (The York Brothers song), a 1955 song and record by The York Brothers

== Other uses ==
- Pretty Little Things (book), a 2010 novel by Jilliane Hoffman
- PrettyLittleThing.com (retailer), a UK-based online fast-fashion brand founded in 2012; now part of the BooHoo Group
- "Pretty Little Thing" (TV ad), a 2016 television advertisement produced by DaWood

== See also ==
- Little Things (disambiguation)
- Pretty Thing (disambiguation)
- Pretty Things (disambiguation)
- Pretty Young Thing (disambiguation)
