= Pretty Thing (disambiguation) =

Pretty Thing may refer to:

- "Pretty Thing", a 1955 song written by Bo Diddley and Willie Dixon and performed by Bo Diddley.
- Pretty Thing (film), a film directed by Justin Kelly.

== See also ==
- Pretty Things (disambiguation)
- Pretty Young Thing (disambiguation)
- Pretty Little Thing
