= Pretty Things (disambiguation) =

The Pretty Things are an English rock band.

Pretty Things may also refer to:

- "Oh! You Pretty Things", a 1971 song by David Bowie
- The Pretty Things (album), a 1965 album by the band
- The Pretty Things/Philippe DeBarge, another album by the band
- Pretty Things (album), a 1970 album by jazz saxophonist Lou Donaldson
- Pretty Things (novel), a 2020 novel by Janelle Brown
- Pretty Things (2001 film), a film directed by Gilles Paquet-Brenner and based on Virginie Despentes's 1998 novel Les Jolies Choses
- Pretty Things (2005 film), a documentary film by Liz Goldwyn
- "Pretty Things", a 2010 song by Take That from Progress
- Pretty Things: the Last Generation of American Burlesque Queens, a 2006 book by Liz Goldwyn

== See also ==
- Pretty Thing (disambiguation)
- Dirty Pretty Things (disambiguation)
- Pretty Little Thing (disambiguation)
- Pretty Young Thing (disambiguation)
- Ugly Things
