= Devilicious =

Single by Nikki Webster
- Released: 12 June 2009
- Recorded: 2008
- Genre: Pop; dance
- Length: 3:07
- Label: Piller Records
- Songwriter(s): Peter Rafelson; Mike Rizzo; Nikki Webster

Nikki Webster singles chronology
"Let's Dance" (2004)	"Devilicious" (2009)	"Strawberry Kisses 2017" (2017)

Music video
- "Devilicious" on YouTube

"Devilicious" is the first single from Nikki Webster's fourth studio album. The track was released digitally and physically on June 12, 2009. The single peaked at number 4 on the Australian ARIA Physical Singles Chart and at 12 on the ARIA Dance Chart.

== Promotion ==
The song made numerous headlines through the media during April 2009 due to Nikki's much publicised comeback. She performed the track with four backup dancers on The Morning Show.

== Music video ==
A video premiered in April 2009 on the Piller Records website. It features her in a warehouse (the Rozelle Tram Depot) dancing with others. The video was directed by Luke Eve and choreographed by William Forsythe. Dancers included Mashum Liberta and Heath Keating.

== Track listing ==
CD single

1. "Devilicious" (Radio Mix) [Mike Rizzo Funk Generation Remix]
2. "Devilicious" (Rafelson Mix)

== Charts ==
Chart performance for "Devilicious"
Chart (2009)	Peak position
Australia (ARIA)	78
