= Something More Beautiful =

2002 single by Nikki Webster

Single by Nikki Webster

from the album Bliss
- Released: 29 July 2002
- Length: 3:32
- Label: BMI
- Songwriters: Pauli Reinikainen; J. Alberg
- Producer: Chong Lim

Nikki Webster singles chronology
"The Best Days" (2001)	"Something More Beautiful" (2002)	"24/7 (Crazy 'Bout Your Smile)" (2002)

Music video
- "Something More Beautiful" on YouTube

"Something More Beautiful" is the first single from Australian singer Nikki Webster's second studio album, Bliss (2002), released on 29 July 2002. It peaked at No. 13 on the Australian ARIA Singles Chart in August 2002. The song was originally recorded by American girl group P.Y.T. in 1999.

== Music video ==
The music video for "Something More Beautiful" is set in a 3D underwater world. It was directed by Mark Hartley, with dancing choreographed by William Forsythe. A behind-the-scenes look at the making of the video is included on The Best of Nikki Webster DVD.

== Track listing ==
Australian CD single

1. "Something More Beautiful" (radio mix) – 3:32
2. "Something More Beautiful" (NRG mix) – 3:32
3. "Something More Beautiful" (karaoke mix) – 3:30
4. "Something More Beautiful" (video)

== Charts ==
=== Weekly charts ===
Chart (2002)	Peak position
Australia (ARIA)	13

=== Year-end charts ===
Chart (2002)	Position
Australian Artists (ARIA)	17

== Certifications ==
Region	Certification	Certified units/sales
Australia (ARIA)	Gold	35,000^{^}
^{^} Shipments figures based on certification alone.
