= LittleThings =

Digital media firm

- Website type: Digital media
- Available in: English
- Owner: RockYou Media
- Website: littlethings.com
- Commercial: Yes
- Launched: 2014
- Current status: Active

LittleThings is a digital media firm that published positive, uplifting stories geared towards American women. LittleThings attracted its following primarily through distributing its content on Facebook targeting a female audience.

In 2015, LittleThings had the most popular Facebook post.

On February 27, 2018, LittleThings announced it was shutting down, citing Facebook's algorithm shift taking out 75% of their organic traffic.

On April 10, 2018, LittleThings was acquired by RockYou Media, an entertainment and media company aimed at millennials. RockYou Media relaunched of LittleThings.
