= Siyahamba =

Popular song

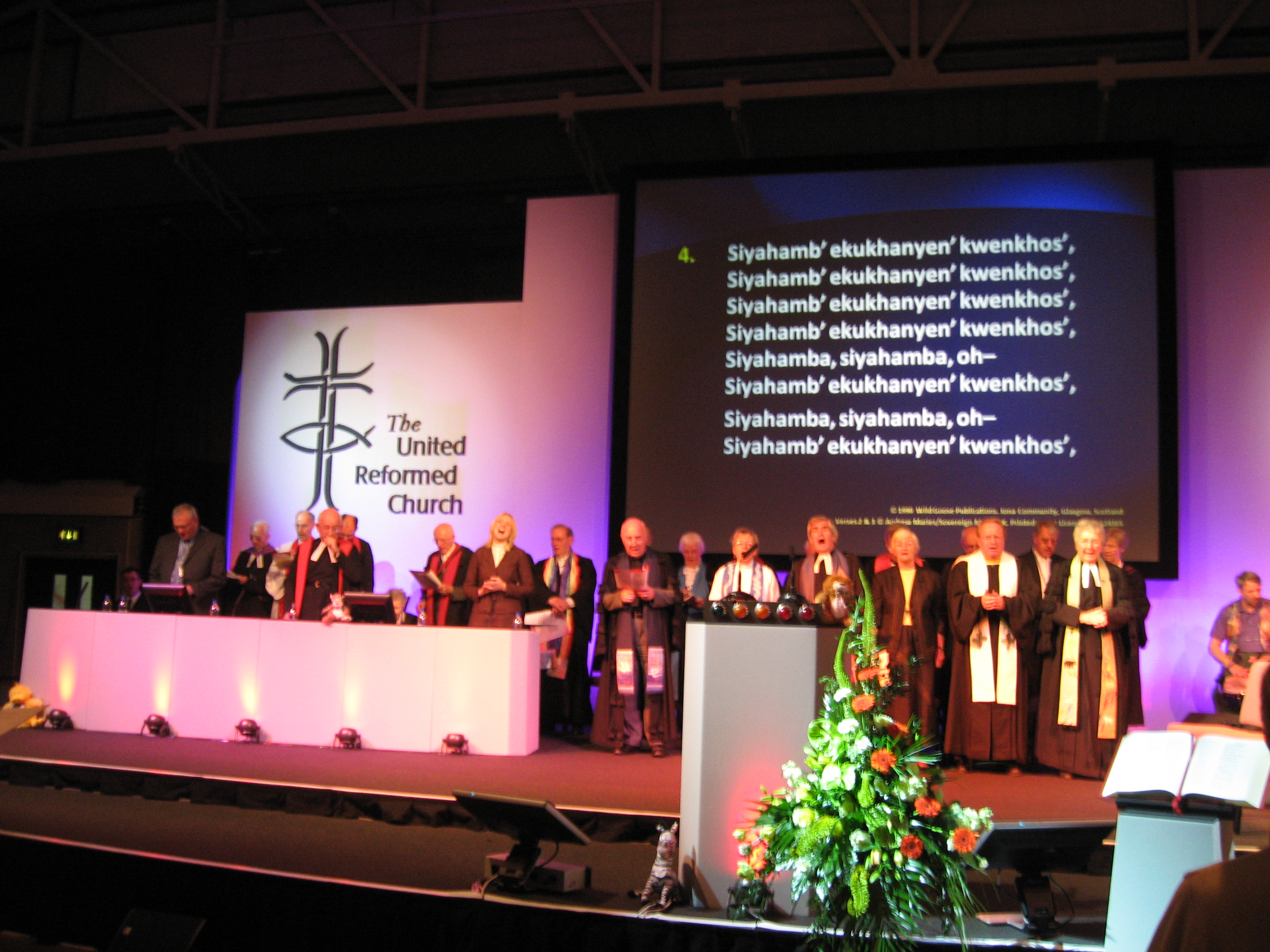
Singing "Siyahamba" with the former moderators at the United Reformed Church General Assembly 2007, Manchester

Siyahamba (written down by Andries Van Tonder, and possibly composed by him, or possibly a Zulu folk song) is a South African Christian hymn that became popular in North American churches in the 1990s. The title means "We Are Marching" or "We are Walking" in the Zulu language.

== History ==
"Siyahamba" is a Zulu chorus that emerged in a rural Protestant congregation, possibly in the former Natal province of South Africa. The chorus may have existed in an oral form before 1952, when Andries van Tonder of Dundee, Natal, first transcribed it. Van Tonder is also credited as the author of the earliest known Afrikaans version of the lyrics, while the authors of the melody and of the Zulu lyrics are unknown. The lyrics, with their biblical imagery of walking in the divine light, could be inspired by Methodist or Pentecostal hymnody. The melody has more similarities with African or Afro-American patterns than with conventional European church music.

In 1978, the Swedish choral group Fjedur toured South Africa at the invitation of the Evangelical Lutheran Church of South Africa. It was during this tour that Fjedur's musical director, Anders Nyberg, heard and recorded "Siyahamba" at a girls' school in Appelsbosch, Natal. Subsequently, this song has been used around the world by schools in their prayers.

In 1984, Nyberg arranged "Siyahamba" for a four-voice setting and published it in a songbook and recording called Freedom is Coming: Songs of Protest and Praise from South Africa. In 1994, GIA Publications included the song (under the title "We Are Marching in the Light of God") in Gather Comprehensive, a hymnal widely used in American Catholic parishes. A year later, the United Church of Christ included the song, under the same title, in The New Century Hymnal. Community of Christ included the song in its 2002 hymnal, Community of Christ Sings. Shortly thereafter, the Unitarian Universalist Association included the song in its 2005 supplemental hymnbook, Singing the Journey.

"Siyahamba" is often performed by children's groups in both sacred and secular environments. Occasionally, the translated lyrics are modified for a secular performance: for example, the English translation "We are marching in the light of God" becomes "We are standing in the light of peace."

Although "Siyahamba" has been associated with the anti-apartheid movement, it was not composed as a protest song and evidently did not feature prominently in the repertoire of anti-apartheid campaigners in South Africa. However, after its introduction to Europe and the US by Nyberg in the 1980s, it was often used in the international effort to end the regime of racial discrimination in South Africa, particularly, because of its devotional message, in the campaign organised by Christian churches in the West. Nowadays, "Siyahamba" is viewed both locally and internationally as a liberation song. As such, it is still performed not only in church and at concerts, but also at rallies, demonstrations, and processions, sometimes with the lyrics modified to match the cause of the event. In this way, the historic South African tune continues to contribute to current struggles for change.

== Lyrics ==
Siyahamba is a "zipper song": the lyrics consist of one phrase, repeated with permutations. This results in a structure that is perceived as cyclical rather than linear. Hawn notes that cyclical forms tend to emphasize a spirit of community and allow for physical response during the performance. This cyclical form, along with the meaning of the lyrics, may explain the song's popularity as a processional and offertory as well as a protest or marching song.

=== Afrikaans ===
Ons marsjeer nou in die lig van God,

Ons marsjeer nou in die lig van God.

Ons marsjeer nou in die lig van God,

Ons marsjeer nou in die lig van God.
[in die lig van God]

Ons marsjeer nou... ooh
[Ons marsjeer nou, marsjeer nou, ons marsjeer nou, marsjeer nou,]

Ons marsjeer nou in die lig van God.
[in die lig van God]

Ons marsjeer nou... ooh
[Ons marsjeer nou, marsjeer nou, ons marsjeer nou, marsjeer nou,]

Ons marsjeer nou in die lig van God.

(Lyrics may alternate marsjeer with different verbs such as wandel.)

=== Zulu ===
Siyahamb' ekukhanyeni kwenkos,

Siyahamba ekukhanyeni kwenkos'.

Siyahamb' ekukhanyeni kwenkos',

Siyahamba ekukhanyeni kwenkos'.
[ekukhanyeni kwenkos']

Siyahamba... ooh
[Siyahamba, hamba, Siyahamba, hamba]

Siyahamba ekukhanyeni kwenkos'.
[ekukhanyeni kwenkos']

Siyahamba... ooh
[Siyahamba, hamba, Siyahamba, hamba]

Siyahamba ekukhanyeni kwenkos'.

=== English ===
We are marching in the light of God,

We are marching in the light of God.

We are marching in the light of God,

We are marching in the light of God.
[in the light of God]

We are marching... ooh
[We are marching, marching, we are marching,]

We are marching in the light of God.
[in the light of God]

We are marching... ooh
[We are marching, marching, we are marching,]

We are marching in the light of God.

(Lyrics may alternate marching with different verbs such as walking, dancing, singing, living, or praying, or the word God for love or peace in a less religious gathering.)
