= PYT (Down with Me) =

PYT (Down With Me)

Studio album by P.Y.T.
- Released: June 19, 2001
- Recorded: 1999–2000
- Genre: Pop, R&B
- Length: 57:29
- Label: Epic

Singles from P.Y.T.
- 1. "PYT (Down With Me)" Released: August 29, 2000; 2. "Same Ol' Same Ol' (Remix)" Released: February 27, 2001

Professional ratings
Review scores
| Source | Rating |
|---|---|
| AllMusic | 2.5/5 stars |
| New Sunday Times | |
| Sunday Mail | |

PYT (Down With Me) is the only studio album by American girl group P.Y.T.'s. It features the single "Same Ol Same Ol" featuring rapper Sarai and "PYT (Down With Me)". It also features a hidden track by Sarai.

== Track listing ==
| # | Title | Length |
|---|---|---|
| 1. | "Who's Lovin' Me" (cover version of Jackson 5 hit "Who's Lovin' You"; written by Smokey Robinson) | 1:08 |
| 2. | "Same Ol' Same Ol'" (Remix) (featuring Sarai; written by David Axelrod, Christina Milian and Beau Dozier) | 3:05 |
| 3. | "Yeah, Yeah, Yeah" (written by Jarret Washington, Neely Dinkins, Noah Porter and Vito Colapietro) | 3:44 |
| 4. | "Weak" (written by Anthony President, Brainz Dimilo, Channette Higgens, Channoah Higgens) | 4:30 |
| 5. | "Simple Things" (written by Jacqueline Nemorin, Toby Gad, Alonzo Williams, Dave McPherson) | 3:58 |
| 6. | "PYT (Down With Me)" (written by Chanette and Channoah Higgens, Andre Culley and Rod Norman) | 3:59 |
| 7. | "I Like the Way (The Kissing Game)" (cover of the hit single from Hi-Five; written by Bernard Bell, David Way and Teddy Riley) | 3:56 |
| 8. | "Ain't No Ifs Ands or Buts About It" (written by Chanette and Channoah Higgens, Culley, Norman) | 3:45 |
| 9. | "Same Ol' Same Ol'" (Sarai Mix; written by Milian, Dozier, Sarai Howard) | 3:14 |
| 10. | "You Don't Know" (written by Phillip Aaron) | 3:28 |
| 11. | "Sweet Kisses" (written by Tony Battaglia and Anthony Harrison) | 4:04 |
| 12. | "Call Me Anytime" (written by Battaglia and Shaun Fisher) | 4:01 |
| 13. | "Deep Down" (written by Darryl McClary, Brandi Tate and Michael Allen) | 4:14 |
| 14. | "A Girl Can Dream" (written by Jimmy Santis, Nina Ossoff, Steve Skinner) | 4:10 |
| 15. | "Same Ol' Same Ol'" | 3:25 |
| 16. | "It's Official" (snippet) (hidden track by Sarai) | 2:48 |
| | Total time | 57:29 |
