= Follow Your Heart (Nikki Webster album) =

Studio album by Nikki Webster
- Released: 20 August 2001
- Recorded: Melbourne, Australia; Sydney, Australia
- Studios: Ipoh Studios; Riversound Studios; Metropolis Audio; Studios 301
- Length: 43:32
- Label: Gotham
- Producer: Chong Lim

Nikki Webster chronology
Follow Your Heart (2001)	Bliss (2002)

Singles from Follow Your Heart
- 1. "Strawberry Kisses" Released: 11 June 2001; 2. "Depend on Me" Released: 3 September 2001; 3. "The Best Days" Released: 3 December 2001

Follow Your Heart is the first album by Australian singer Nikki Webster, released in Australia on 20 August 2001 (see 2001 in music) by Gotham Records. The album has a genre of pop songs, and was produced by Chong Lim.

The album produced Webster's first top ten single on the ARIA Charts, giving her the record of being one of the youngest singers to debut at number two. The album also generated another top twenty single. In 2002, the album was nominated for an ARIA Music Awards for the "Highest Selling Album" for 2002 but lost to Kylie Minogue's album Fever. Follow Your Heart was the thirty-second highest selling album in Australia for 2001 and was certified platinum by ARIA selling 70,000 copies in Australia.

== Reception ==
The album made its debut on the Australian Albums Chart on 27 August 2001 at number six and was certified Gold. On its second week in the chart it fell four places to number ten but on its third week at jumped five places to number five and stayed there for two consecutive weeks. It then fell out of the top ten to number eleven but the next week it jumped back to number ten. After two weeks the album fell out of the top twenty to number twenty-four. On its eleventh week in the chart it jumped back into the top twenty from number twenty-six and then rose three places to number sixteen. It then dropped out of the top twenty to number thirty rising a few times then falling out of the top fifty. The album spent twenty-two weeks in the top fifty leaving at number forty-four and it spent twenty-eight weeks in the top one hundred leaving at number ninety-nine.

The singles released from Follow Your Heart were released in Australia. "Strawberry Kisses" was the first song released from the album. It debuted on the Australian ARIA Singles Chart at number two, was there for seven weeks, and was accredited Platinum by ARIA. It also charted in the UK at number sixty-four and in New Zealand at number forty. "Depend on Me" was the second song released from the album and gave Webster her third top twenty single, peaking at number sixteen and getting certified Gold. "The Best Days" was the third and final song released from the album and featured a cover of the song "Over the Rainbow". It peaked at number twenty-one in Australia and was also certified Gold.

== Track listing ==
1. "Strawberry Kisses" (Jeff Franzel, Andy Marvel, Marjorie Maye) – 3:30
2. "Depend on Me" (Anders Hansson, Steven Diamond) – 3:55
3. "Mirror Mirror" (Johan Åberg, Paul Rein) – 3:41
4. "The Best Days" (Mark Holden, Axel Breitung) – 3:25
5. "Boy Inside My Heart" (Samuel Waermo, M. Waermo) – 3:45
6. "Heavenly" (Pelle Ankarberg) – 3:26
7. "Friends 4 Ever" (Jan Lindvaag, Aleena Gibson) – 4:10
8. "Individuality" (Hansson, Savan Kotecha) – 2:48
9. "All Come Back to You" (Hansson, Mårten Sandén) – 3:42
10. "Red Light Green Light" (Franzel, Andrew Snitzer, Maye) – 3:45
11. "I Will Be Your Friend" (Michelle Lewis, Dane DeViller, Sean Hosein) – 3:32
12. "Follow Your Heart" (Holden, Paul Wiltshire) – 3:51

== Charts ==
=== Weekly charts ===
Chart (2001)	Peak position
Australian Albums (ARIA)	5

=== Year-end charts ===
Chart (2001)	Position
Australia (ARIA)	32

== Certifications ==
Region	Certification	Certified units/sales
Australia (ARIA)	Platinum	70,000^{^}
^{^} Shipments figures based on certification alone.
