= 24/7 (Crazy 'Bout Your Smile) =

2002 single by Nikki Webster

Single by Nikki Webster

from the album Bliss
- Released: 14 October 2002
- Length: 3:17
- Label: Gotham
- Songwriters: Pauli Reinikainen; Daniel Eklund
- Producer: Chong Lim

Nikki Webster singles chronology
"Something More Beautiful" (2002)	"24/7 (Crazy 'Bout Your Smile)" (2002)	"Dancing in the Street" (2003)

"24/7 (Crazy 'Bout Your Smile)" is a song by Australian singer Nikki Webster, released as a single on 12 October 2002. It was written by Swedish songwriters Daniel Eklund and Paul Rein as an English rendition of the song "Me pierdo junto a ti" ("I Am Lost Next to You") by Spanish singer Natalia (which had lyrics in Spanish by Ignacio Ballesteros Díaz). The song was released as the second single from the album Bliss and at number 19 on the Australian ARIA Singles Chart in October 2002. The music video was filmed at Ku-ring-gai Creative Arts High School in North Turramurra, a suburb of Sydney.

== Track listing ==
Australia CD single

1. "24/7 (Crazy 'Bout Your Smile)"
2. "24/7 (Crazy 'Bout Your Smile)" (Nite 'N Day mix)
3. "To Have to Let Go"
4. "24/7 (Crazy 'Bout Your Smile)" (karaoke mix)

== Charts ==
Chart (2002)	Peak position
Australia (ARIA)	19
