= Let's Dance (Nikki Webster album) =

Studio album by Nikki Webster
- Released: 21 June 2004
- Recorded: 2003–2004
- Studio: River Studios, Melbourne
- Genre: Pop; dance
- Length: 43:52
- Label: Gotham
- Producer: Chong Lim

Nikki Webster chronology
Bliss (2002)	Let's Dance (2004)	The Best of Nikki Webster (2004)

Singles from Let's Dance
- 1. "Dancing in the Street" Released: 29 September 2003; 2. "Let's Dance" Released: 7 June 2004

Let's Dance is the third studio album by Australian pop singer, Nikki Webster, released on 21 June 2004 by BMG/Gotham Records. It is an album which found Webster working with a different style of music, a range of dance music was added. It peaked at number forty-six on the ARIA Albums Chart.

Webster provided her cover versions of various tracks, which include, "Dancing in the Street" by Martha and the Vandellas, "I Wanna Dance with Somebody (Who Loves Me)" by Whitney Houston, "ABC" by The Jackson 5, "My Boy Lollipop" by Millie Small, "You Make Me Feel Like Dancing" by Leo Sayer, "Walking on Sunshine" by Katrina and the Waves and "Be Mine" by Wild Orchid.

The front cover was shot at Webster's secondary school, The McDonald College, and includes several of her ballerina friends in the shot. They included Katherine Harper, the then School Captain, with whom Nikki had worked with as part of the Student Prefect team to help raise a record amount for the Exodus Foundation. Other Dancers used include Serena Chalker (Prefect and Dux, 2004), Amanda Platcher, Sara Czarnotta (Vice Captain, 2004), Samantha Jennings and Ann Conolly.

The American comedy film, Kindergarten Cop 2 (2016), included Webster's version of "ABC". However, it was not released with the official soundtrack for the film.

== Track listing ==
1. "Let's Dance" (Axel Breitung, Delta Goodrem, Mark Holden) – 3:58
2. "Dancing in the Street" (Marvin Gaye, Ivy Hunter, William Stevenson) – 3:53
3. "ABC" (Alphonso Mizell, Berry Gordy, Frederick Perren, Deke Richards) – 3:04
4. "My Boy Lollipop" (Morris Levy, Johnnie Roberts) – 3:41
5. "The Beat of Life" (Georgie Dennis, Rickey Hanley, Sean Creasey) – 3:47
6. "You Make Me Feel Like Dancing" (Leo Sayer, Vince Poncia) – 3:09
7. "I Wanna Dance With Somebody (Who Loves Me)" (Shannon Roberts, George Merrill) – 4:45
8. "Zero Gravity" (Pete Kirtley, Tim Hawes, Sean Hosein, Dane Deviller) – 3:21
9. "Don't Give Up" (Chong Lim, Nikki Webster) – 3:45
10. "Be Mine" (Hosein, Deviller, Stacy Ferguson, Renee Sandstrom, Stefanie Ridel) – 3:25
11. "This Is How We Do It" (Dennis, Michael Harwood, Nick Keynes, Jon O'Mahoney) – 3:00
12. "Walking on Sunshine" (Kimberley Raw) – 4:04

== Personnel ==
- Guitars (all tracks except "Let's Dance") – Stuart Fraser
- Guitars on "Let's Dance" and "Walking on Sunshine" – Brett Garsed
- Keyboards, programming and percussion – Chong Lim
- Harmonica and saxophone on "My Boy Lollipop" – Steve Williams
- All backing vocals – Nikki Nichols
- Additional backing vocals on "Dancing in the Street" – Lindsay Field
- Additional vocals on "You Make Me Feel Like Dancing" – Mark Williams
- Tap dancing on "Let's Dance" – Nikki Webster and Kaylie Yee
- Vocal director on "Let's Dance", "Dancing in the Street", "You Make Me Feel Like Dancing" and "Walking on Sunshine" – Danielle Gaha
- Cover shoot for "Let's Dance" – Katherine Harper, Amanda Platcher, Serena Chalker, Sara Czarnotta, Samantha Jennings, Ann Conolly

== Charts ==
Chart performance for Let's Dance
Chart (2004)	Peak position
Australian Albums (ARIA)	46
