= P.Y.T. (band) =

American girl group

- Origin: Tampa, Florida
- Genres: Pop, R&B
- Years active: 1998–2002
- Label: Epic Records
- Past members: Lauren Mayhew; Tracy Williams; Ashley Niven; Lydia Bell

P.Y.T. was an American girl group from Florida that formed in 1998 and parted in 2002.

PYT toured with 'N Sync, Britney Spears and Destiny's Child and 98 Degrees and performed at the 2001 Super Bowl pre-game show. They had their music used in the films Center Stage, Miss Congeniality, and Bring it On, as well as the TV soap opera Guiding Light. They released their delayed debut album PYT (Down with Me) in the middle of 2001.

== Formation ==
P.Y.T.'s was formed by four Tampa teenagers—Ashley Niven, Lauren Mayhew, Lydia Bell, and Tracy Williams—who had all been childhood friends. They had previously performed together in the Tampa Bay's Entertainment Revue (through Busch Gardens). The band formed, as Glory, to enter a contest in Teen People magazine. They recorded a demo which instead of entering in the contest made its way to Dave McPherson of Epic Records who signed them to a record contract in 1999. The band was renamed P.Y.T., the name coming from the Michael Jackson song "P.Y.T. (Pretty Young Thing)," though on some occasions the girls used the acronym "P.Y.T." to stand for the slogan "Prove Yourself True." Among the members of the group, Williams was the alto and sang lower harmonies, Mayhew and Niven were mezzo-sopranos and sang the melody line, and Bell was the soprano who sang higher harmonies. Niven was the lead vocalist on the tracks on the album PYT (Down With Me).

== Career ==
In 1999, the group released their first single, "Something More Beautiful" eventually being rerecorded by Australian singer Nikki Webster in 2002 gaining her a hit on the ARIA Charts peaking at number 13. The following year, they released the R&B-tinged "Down With Me," featuring mostly the vocals of Ashley Niven. Though not credited, the members of P.Y.T. appeared as friends of fellow pop singer Mandy Moore in her music video "Candy." To promote their new single and forthcoming album, P.Y.T. toured with the likes of *NSYNC and Britney Spears. In 2001, the group released the single "Same Ol' Same Ol'". A remix version of the song was released with a video which premiered on Nickelodeon. P.Y.T. continued to tour with 98 Degrees and Destiny's Child before finally releasing their debut album "PYT (Down With Me)" in August 2001. Soon after, P.Y.T. was dropped from Epic. After considering finding a new label the band disbanded soon after.

Lauren Mayhew decided to focus on acting and went on to host The N's teen version of Access Hollywood -- Real Access. She has since had guest roles on television programs such as Joan of Arcadia and American Dreams. In films, Mayhew portrayed the role of Robin in the film Raise Your Voice starring Hilary Duff, and Arianna in American Pie: Band Camp. She was the Ring Announcer from the World Wrestling Entertainment's ECW brand. Tracy Williams formed the all-girl trio UC3, which has played throughout the United States and performed for US troops overseas.

== Discography ==
=== Studio albums ===
- PYT (Down with Me) (June 19, 2001)

=== Singles ===
- "Something More Beautiful" (1999)
- "PYT (Down with Me)" (2000)
- "Same Ol' Same Ol'" (remix) feat. Sarai (2001)

== Soundtrack appearances ==
- We’re Dancing and A Girl Can Dream in Center Stage (2000)
- Anywhere USA in Bring It On and Miss Congeniality (2000)
- Same Ol' Same Ol' in the video game Project Gotham Racing (2001)
