= We'll Be One =

Single by Nikki Webster
- Released: 2 October 2000 (Australia)
- Recorded: 2000
- Genre: Pop
- Length: 4:13
- Label: Columbia
- Songwriter(s): Kylieann Hewitt, Philip Turcio
- Producer(s): Chong Lim

Nikki Webster singles chronology
"We'll Be One" (2000)	"Strawberry Kisses" (2001)

"We'll Be One" is a pop song performed by Nikki Webster at the 2000 Summer Olympics closing ceremony. It was written by Kylieann Hewitt and Philip Turcio, produced by Chong Lim and is featured on the 2000 Summer Olympics closing ceremony soundtrack. It was released in October 2000 as a CD single in Australia. The song is about all the nations coming together and becoming one. Webster was only 13 years old at the time of the song's release.

== Track listing ==
1. "We'll Be One"
2. "Under Southern Skies"
3. "Advance Australia Fair"
4. "Journey of Angels"

== Charts ==
Chart (2000)	Peak position
Australian ARIA Singles Chart	19
