= 2000 Summer Olympics opening ceremony =

- Part of 2000 Summer Olympics
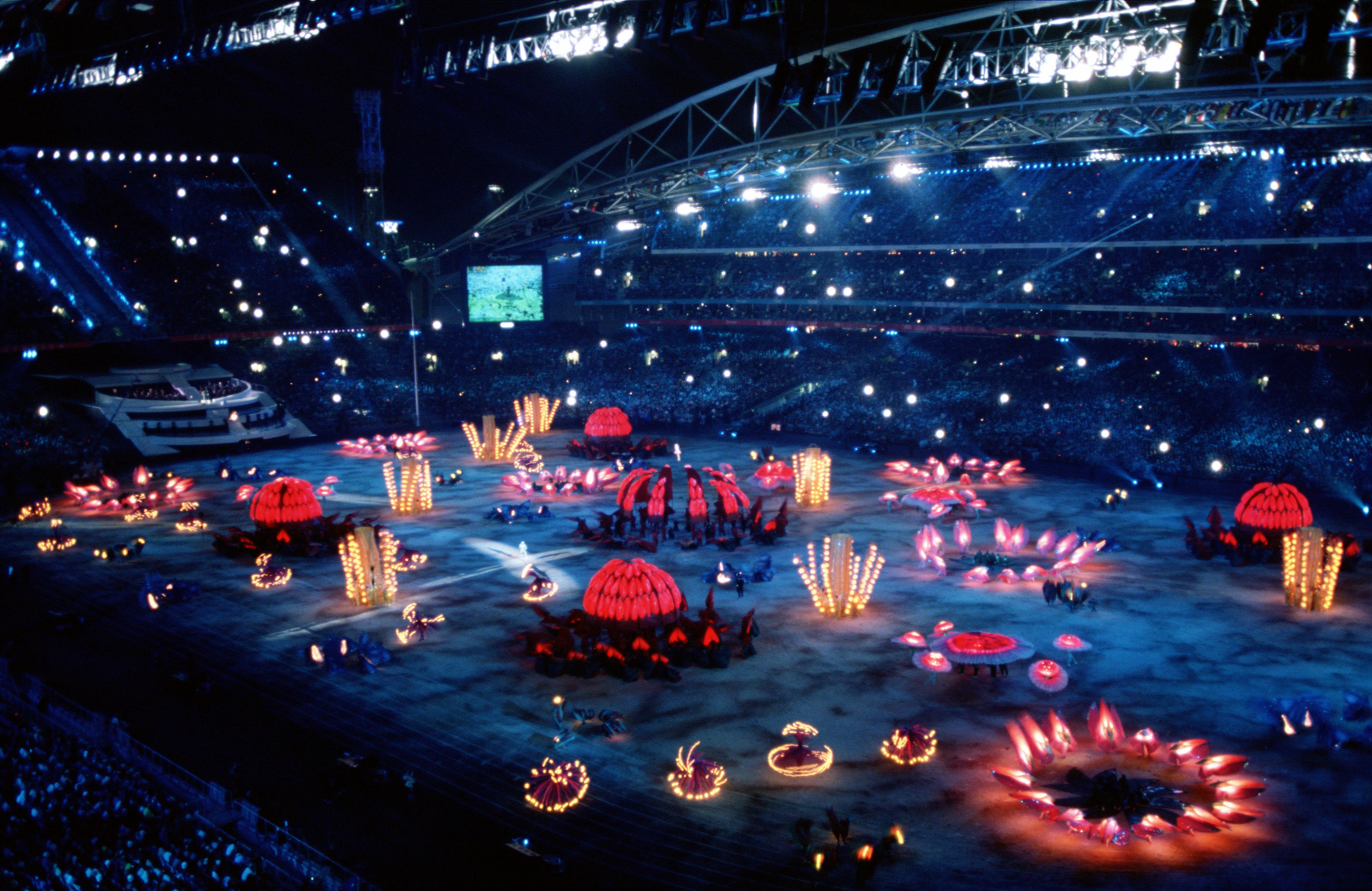
- Fire and Nature segment of the opening ceremony
- Date: 15 September 2000; 26 years ago
- Time: 19:00 – 23:19 AEDT (UTC+11)
- Venue: Stadium Australia
- Location: Sydney, New South Wales, Australia; 33°50′50″S 151°03′48″E
- Filmed by: Sydney Olympic Broadcasting Organisation (SOBO)
- Participants: 12,500
- Footage: Sydney 2000 Opening Ceremony – Full Length on YouTube

The opening ceremony of the 2000 Summer Olympics took place on the evening of Friday, 15 September 2000 in Stadium Australia, Sydney, during which the Games were formally opened by then-Governor-General Sir William Deane. As mandated by the Olympic Charter, the proceedings combined the formal and ceremonial opening of this international sporting event, including welcoming speeches, hoisting of the flags and the parade of athletes, with an artistic spectacle to showcase the host nation's culture and history.

Veteran ceremonies director Ric Birch was the director of ceremonies while David Atkins was the artistic director and producer. Its artistic section highlighted several aspects of Australian culture and history, showing Australia's flora and fauna, technology, multiculturalism, and the hopeful moment of reconciliation towards Aboriginal Australians. The ceremony had a cast of 12,687 performers, seen by a stadium audience of around 110,000.

The ceremony began at 19:00 AEDT and lasted over four-and-a-half hours. Around 3.7 billion viewers worldwide watched the ceremony on TV.

The ceremony was described by the President of the International Olympic Committee (IOC) Juan Antonio Samaranch as the most beautiful ceremony the world had ever seen. Consistent with normal major production management, the music was pre-recorded under studio conditions to ensure its quality.

The stadium's French-language announcer was Pascale Ledeur, while the English-language announcer was Australian actor John Stanton. Ledeur was also the French announcer at the opening ceremonies of the Atlanta 1996 and Salt Lake City 2002 Olympic Games.

== Preparations ==
As one of the motto's of the games was the "Games of the New Millennium", there was a major reevaluation on how to present the Olympics, which included the ceremonies. In regards to the protocol of the ceremony, there had been incremental changes in the ceremonies format after 1960 Summer Olympics where the Olympic Anthem was readopted, and with the symbolic release of doves starting at 1994 Winter Olympics. For Sydney, the ceremonies producers chose to have the lighting of the cauldron at the end of the ceremony, rather than having it in the middle of the protocol section in previous ceremonies.

The artistic section, where it showed the host countries culture through a separate presentation, gained more prominence since Moscow 1980. The Moscow Opening ceremony was one that Australian director Ric Birch had been personally impressed by. This was the first opening ceremony which showed the host country's national culture through one narrative rather than multiple segments

By 2000, Birch had worked on global events for over 18 years producing high-profile events. He directed the 1982 Commonwealth Games opening and closing ceremonies, and the cultural and the opening ceremonies for World Expo 88, both held in Brisbane. He was also asked to direct and produce some segments for the 1984 and 1992 Summer Olympic opening and closing ceremonies and was involved in Sydney's handover segment at the 1996 Summer Olympics closing ceremony. Birch was hired to produce the ceremonies in September 1993. The idea for the cauldron reveal at the end of the ceremony was planned during the design process of Stadium Australia, as they needed to consider requirements of the water structure of the northern stand and extra supports for the height of the cauldron arc. For the rest of the ceremony, Birch wanted a model where each segment was organised by a specialty director, and was given free artistic reign in their segment as long as it was telling its part of the story. The team of directors were assembled in 1997, with David Atkins as the head artistic director and producer. In August 2000, the organisers announced the eleven main performers, the twenty-one composers and four conductors held in a press conference in Melbourne.

Ahead of the opening of the games, and as testing beds for the content of the ceremonies, the Sydney Organising Committee for the Olympic Games developed four Olympic Arts Festivals beginning in 1997. The first festival, the Festival of the Dreaming was established by Rhoda Roberts. The festival was a celebration of Aboriginal and Torres Strait Islander arts and culture. Roberts was later selected as a segment director for the ceremony. The second festival was A Sea Change, in which artists and companies from Australia and Oceania explored "the influence of the sea on Australian life as a means to explore the changing political and cultural climates in Australia". The third festival, "Reaching the World", took the form of an international tour, showcasing Australian culture. The final festival, the Sydney 2000 Olympics Arts Festival, ran before and during the Olympics, and served as a showcase for the diversity and depth of the arts in Australia.

== Officials and guests ==
International Olympic Committee

- IOC:
  - President Juan Antonio Samaranch and Members of the IOC.

The wife of Juan Antonio Samaranch, María Teresa Salisachs Rowe, was seriously ill and was not able to accompany her husband to the Olympics (she died the following day, from cancer). Therefore, Samaranch invited former Australian Olympic Champion swimmer, Dawn Fraser, to accompany him at the ceremony. Dawn Fraser explained some of the cultural references in the display section to him.

Dignitaries from international organizations

- Commonwealth of Nations:
  - Secretary General Don McKinnon
- United Nations:
  - Secretary General Kofi Annan

Dignitaries

- Australia:
  - Governor-General of Australia Sir William Deane (representing the Queen of the United Kingdom & Australia) and wife Helen Deane
  - Prime Minister of Australia John Howard and wife Janette Howard
  - Premier of New South Wales Bob Carr
  - SOCOG President Michael Knight
  - former prime minister Gough Whitlam
  - former prime minister Sir John Gorton,
  - Australian golfer Greg Norman

Foreign dignitaries & VIPs

- United Kingdom:
  - Anne, Princess Royal (representing the Queen of the United Kingdom)
- Belgium:
  - Prince Philippe and wife Princess Mathilde (representing the King of Belgium)
- Canada
  - Governor General Adrienne Clarkson (representing Queen of the United Kingdom & Canada)
- Denmark:
  - Prince Henrik
  - Prince Frederik
  - Prince Joachim (representing the Queen of Denmark)
- Greece
  - Prime Minister Konstantinos Simitis (representing the President of Greece) (host country of 2004 Summer Olympics)
- Monaco:
  - Prince Albert (representing the Prince of Monaco)
- Luxembourg:
  - Grand Duke Jean
- New Zealand:
  - Governor General Michael Hardie Boys (representing the Queen of the United Kingdom & New Zealand)
- Palau:
  - President Johnson Toribiong
- United States:
  - First Daughter Chelsea Clinton (representing the President of the United States of America),
  - Secretary of Health and Human Services Donna Shalala
  - Director of the Office of National Drug Control Policy Barry McCaffrey
  - Muhammad Ali,
  - Bill Gates
  - Mayor of Salt Lake City Rocky Anderson (mayor of host city of 2002 Winter Olympics)

== Proceedings ==
=== Prelude ===
As spectators arrived, they found on their seats a yellow Globite case with Olympic stickers on the front, reminiscent of those that once prevailed in Australian schoolrooms in the 20th century. Inside the case were a pair of green and gold socks, cheer band, a replica of the 2000 Summer Olympics torch, lapel pin, event program, postcard, cards, earplugs, stickers and a Kodak CD-ROM. The torch and cheer band – set with movement-sensitive lights – illuminated the darkened stands during the Fire segment, Arrivals segment and the lighting of the cauldron, while Australian Olympic Team socks appeared prominently on the sea of waving hands during Australia's entry to the stadium.

The Prelude segment lasted an hour before the ceremony started. It was hosted by Seven Network's Sports Commentator David Fordham and news presenter Chris Bath, while seven months pregnant with her first child, live on the northern stage in the stadium. It featured various performances, including a Welcome to Country from the Wangal people, children singing the official Team Welcome Song "G'day G'day", a recognition of the Bidding team and the Olympic volunteers, a recognition from the United Nations of the Olympic Truce, Mexican waves, and a singalong of "Waltzing Matilda" with John Williamson.

=== Welcome and Anthem ===
"Advance Australia Fair"
(Opening Ceremony)

Verse 1 (Sung by Human Nature as A cappella)
Australians all let us rejoice,
For we are young and free;
We've golden soil and wealth for toil;
Our home is girt by sea;
Our land abounds in nature's gifts
Of beauty rich and rare;
In history's page, let every stage
Advance Australia Fair.
In joyful strains then let us sing,
Advance Australia Fair.

Verse 2 (Sung by Julie Anthony with orchestra)
Beneath our radiant Southern Cross
We'll toil with hearts and hands;
To make this Commonwealth of ours
Renowned of all the lands;
For those who've come across the seas
We've boundless plains to share;
With courage let us all combine
To Advance Australia Fair.
In joyful strains then let us sing,
Advance Australia Fair.

Verse 1 Reprise (all voices)

The ceremony began with a countdown composed by Richard Mills performed by Sydney Symphony Orchestra. The large screens counted down from 60 to 1. Starting at 23, footage from previous games appeared on the screens ending with art by Sydney artist Ken Done that read "Opening Ceremony".

The arrival of a lone rider Steve Jefferys, dressed in a drizabone and akubra hat, with his Australian Stock Horse Ammo, galloped into the empty stadium floor reared in the middle of the stadium. Jefferys then cracked his stockwhip, and 120 riders and their Stock Horses entered the stadium performing a "Musical ride " to an arrangement of the main theme of the 1982 film The Man from Snowy River, composed by Bruce Rowland. Each rider held a flag with the Olympic Rings coloured blue. One of the configurations formed the five Olympic Rings. This was a tribute to the heritage of the Australian Stock Horse. Many of its riders were from Scone.

A giant banner painted by Sydney artist Ken Done was unfurled, depicting the Sydney Harbour Bridge in bright colours, saying "G'Day" to the world.

The governor-general Sir William Deane, the prime minister John Howard, and the president of the IOC Juan Antonio Samaranch, arrived after a jazz fanfare was performed by James Morrison and Swing City, his brother's Big Band. The Australian National Anthem, Advance Australia Fair, was then sung by both Human Nature and Julie Anthony, accompanied by the Sydney Symphony Orchestra under the baton of Simone Young. The Stock Horse riders still on the field then swapped their Olympic flags for Australian flags before riding out of the stadium.

- Segment director: Ignatius Jones
- Costume designer: Kristian Fredrikson
- Graphic designer for G'day Bridge: Ken Done

=== Artistic section ===
==== Deep Sea Dreaming ====
The Hero Girl, Nikki Webster arrived in beachwear and basked in the light on a beach. She falls asleep on the beach and drift off into a dream. The performers represented the sea and the various aquatic fauna appear and move around the arena floor. The Hero Girl was then hoisted up in the air by overhead wires and swam with the sea creatures. Other swimmers were also present, being coached (on a large screen) by Australian swimming coach Laurie Lawrence. This was a tribute to the Great Barrier Reef off the coast of Australia.

- Segment Director & Choreographer: Meryl Tankard
- Assistant Director & Choreographer: Steven McTaggart
- Designer: Dan Potra
- Costume Designers: Dan Potra and Meryl Tankard

==== Awakening ====
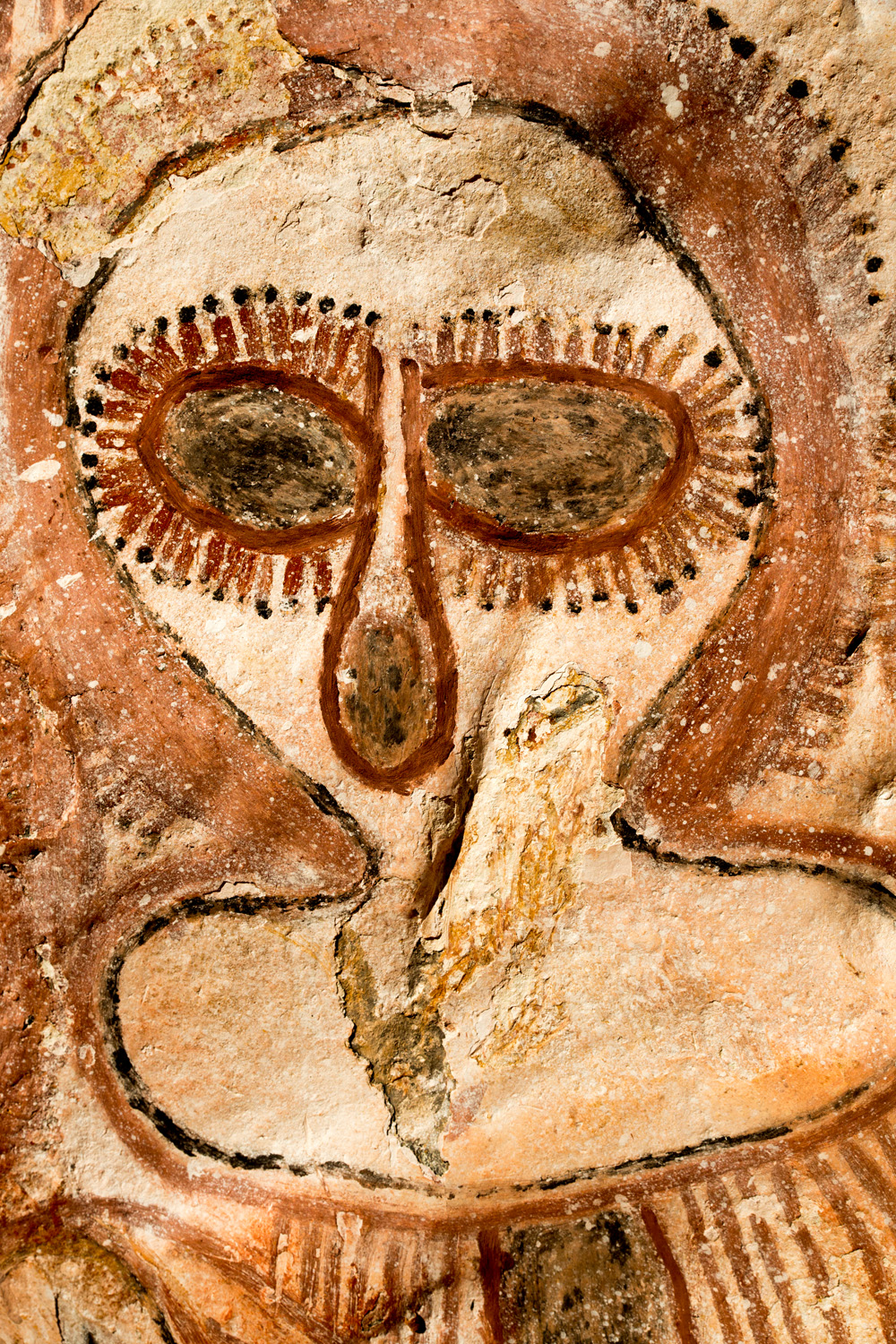
The Awakening segment featured a 32-metres-long cloth showing a Wandjina spirit – a large head that shows the eyes and nose, but with no mouth.

The Awakening segment celebrated Australia's Aboriginal and Torres Strait Islander cultures, the world's oldest continuous living culture, dating back at least 60,000 years. A Yolngu elder and songman, Djakapurra Munyarryun, guided the girl through the songlines of connections to the land and the protocols for welcoming others to indigenous land. The segment featured Indigenous Australians from the Central Desert, the Numbulwar, Yirrkala, Ramingining and Manningrida peoples of Arnhem Land, Torres Strait Islanders, and the Koorie clan of NSW. The segment ended when the Wandjina ancestral spirit appears (in the form of a 32-metre-long cloth in the style of a rock art portrait) roaring and flinging a lightning bolt to ignite a bushfire.

- Segment Directors: Stephen Page and Rhoda Roberts
- Designer: Peter England
- Costume Designer: Jennifer Irwin
- Choreographers: Stephen Page, Matthew Doyle, Elma Kris and Peggy Misi

==== Fire & Nature ====
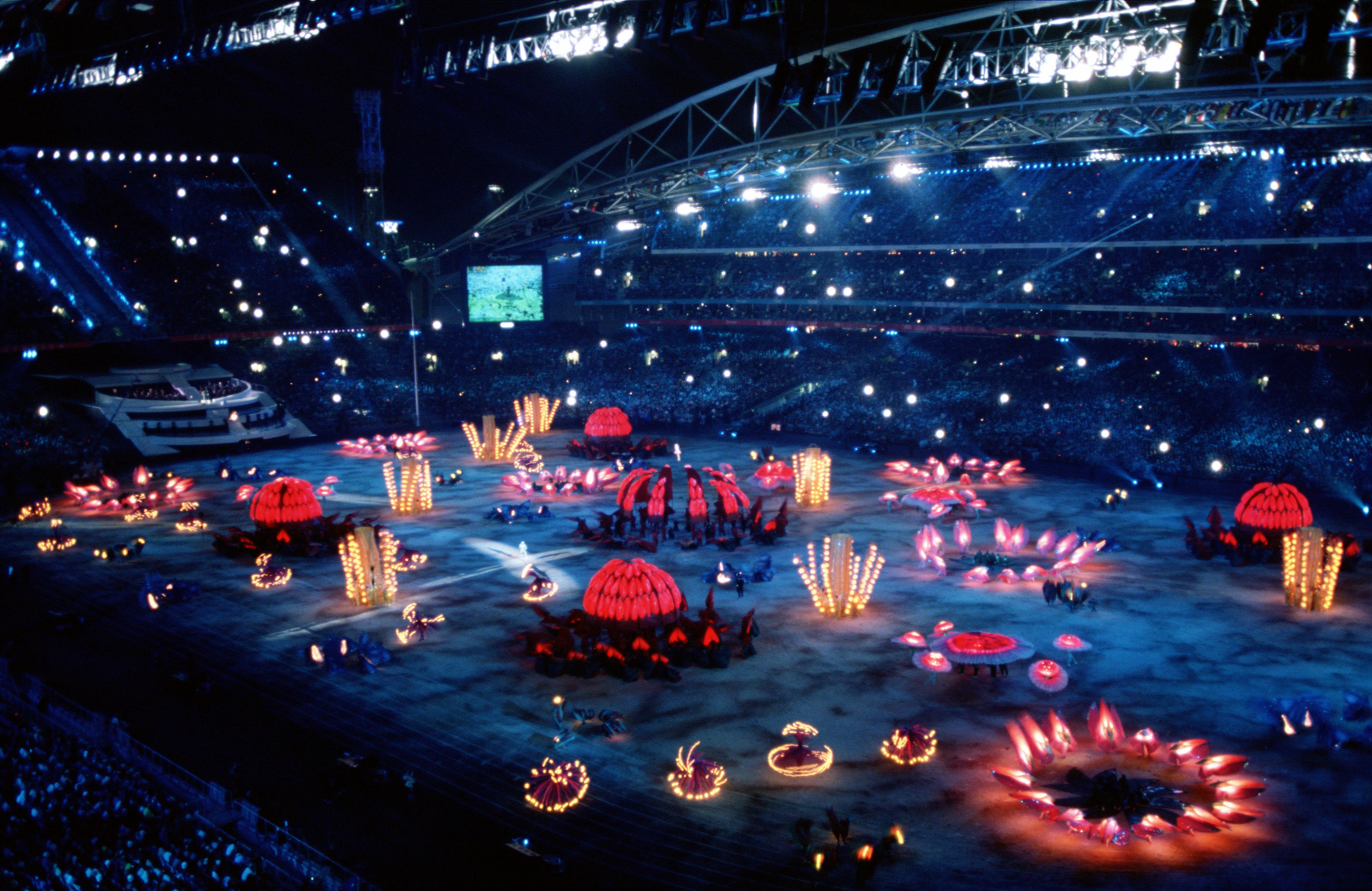
The Nature segment

The Fire and Nature segment showcased the Australian outback, and its unique wildlife and flora. It began with various fire performers (jugglers, breathers) moving across the stadium field, symbolising the advance of a series of bushfires. In the aftermath, performers representing the flora stir as the land is replenished with all types of life. The stadium field is now filled with performers dressed in costumes representing various flowers including Australia's distinctive wild flowers such as the Golden Wattle (Australia's national flower), the Waratah (State flower of New South Wales), the Sturt's Desert Pea, Water Lilies and Eucalypt flowers. The fauna, which were represented by seven large paintings by Ngemba artist Jeffrey Sammuels and were then revealed, depicting the Indigenous animal life in Australia. The flowers once more were illuminated before moving out of the stadium.

Fire credits:

- Segment Director: David Atkins
- Choreographer: Jason Coleman
- Costume Designers: Paula Ryan, Michael Wilkinson

Nature credits:

- Segment Director: Peter Wilson
- Designer: Eamon D'Arcy
- Choreographer: Doug Jack
- Charting Choreographer: Jason Olthoff
- Artwork Graphic Design: Jeffrey Samuels

==== Tin Symphony ====
In the Tin Symphony segment presents the start and consequences of the British settlement in Australia. The segment began with the arrival of Captain James Cook, with naturalist Joseph Banks and crew, with bicycles to represent his ship, HM Bark Endeavour, during Captain Cook's exploration of the Australian east coast. A rabbit inside a cage was one detail found aboard the ship. Captain Cook lit a firework to mark the start of the segment.

Tin Symphony Part 1 – The music, co-written and co-produced by Ian Cooper and John Frohlich, includes an Irish jig montaged with drums, bush sounds and voice. A number of performers dress as the iconic Australian bushranger Ned Kelly (with costumes based on Sir Sidney Nolan's series of Ned Kelly paintings) then appear onto the stadium floor, with while other performers bring out other symbolic items of rural settler life such as corrugated iron and storm water tanks present. A mechanical horse like vehicle was present which then changed into a wind mill. Australian rural culture such as woodcutting and whip cracking were showcased. Irish dancers present in this section danced on the corrugated iron sheets, with umbrellas made up to look like giant cogs and wheels to represent the industrial growth of Australia.

Tin Symphony Part 2 – The tempo changes as Australia's suburban aspects were introduced. In the middle of the stadium floor, a shed was constructed from the corrugated iron sheets. Out of the shed comes a unique representation of sheep, an important livestock for Australia. The sheep were represented by performers in cardboard boxes, that move along with the music. Australian suburbia was represented as the performers emerged from the cardboard boxes with Victa lawn mowers to form the Olympics Rings. The giant mechanical horse then made another appearance, before the hero girl gave an apple to it. At the end of the segment, the mechanical horse neighed to signify the conclusion.

- Segment Director: Nigel Jamieson
- Designer: Dan Potra
- Choreographers: Karen Johnson Mortimer, Doug Jack, Legs on the Wall
- Charting Choreographer: Jason Olthoff

==== Arrivals and Under Southern Skies ====
The Arrivals segment of the ceremony celebrated Australia's multiculturalism and its migrant culture formed by the Australian Gold Rushes and the aftermath of World War II for Australia, with a float, soundtrack and costumes symbolising each continent the migrants came from, coloured by the five Olympic rings that represent each continent. First, performers as migrants from African danced into the stadium wearing black costumes with African beat music. They were followed by dancers in yellow and Asian style musical elements, symbolising the arrival of Asian migrants, led by two pairs of yellow Chinese Lion dancers. European migrants were introduced by the colour green with electronic music, further adding to the growing party on the stadium field. The music changed again into American style music and a splash of red, both symbolising the arrival of migrants from the Americas, was introduced into the stadium. Finally, performers representing migrants from Oceania with an emphasis on New Zealand and Pacific Islander communities came into the stadium in vivid blue costumes. The five floats maneuvered into position to represent their respective coloured rings of the Olympic flag. By the crescendo of the segment, four of the floats (Asia, America, Europe and the Oceanian) surround the African float as the performers from all the represented continents merged into one big group and them rushed out from the middle to form the Australian continent.

The performers stood with arms out reached towards the audience, forming the coastline of Australia and thus symbolising Australia's welcoming arms to people from all over the world. Then many children dressed in the Olympic colours flooded into the arena and formed a solid shape of Australia, as the performers from the sequence before left the performance floor. Webster then performed the song Under Southern Skies with five people representing each continent standing with her, as the children formed a large representation of the Southern Cross constellation with their lanterns.

- Segment director: Lex Marinos
- Designer: Eamon D'Arcy
- Costume designers: Jenny Kee, Lisa Ho, Norma Moriceau, Peter Morrissey
- Choreographer: Jason Coleman

==== Eternity ====
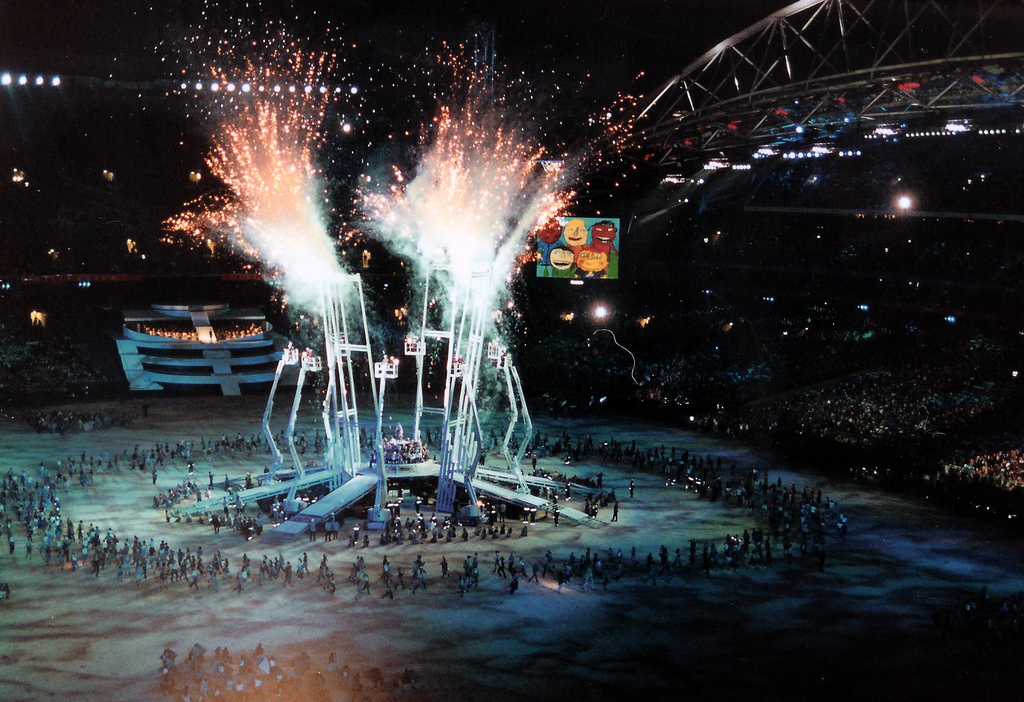
The Eternity segment showed thousands of tap dancers.

The next segment began with Adam Garcia standing on the central float in the middle of the stadium field. He began his performance by tap dancing and inviting more performers onto the stadium. More dancers filed onto the stands where the audience was sitting who also joined in with performance. Several cherry picker cranes in the centre with the floats began to slowly rise up with the crescendo of the music. The dancers symbolised the workers building a new Australia for the future. The dancers in the stands rushed out onto the stadium floor to join their fellow dancers. Some of the dancers held square sheets of steel that they both danced on and held in their hands to reflect light out as they danced. By the finale of this segment, large steel frames rose from each float to form a tall structure. In the middle were the hero girl and the Aboriginal elder, who looked wondrously out into the audience, surveying the workers. Then as the close of the presentation approached, the performers from the other segments all came out and joined in with those already dancing. A large representation of the Sydney Harbour Bridge composed of sparklers was set off in the middle of the stadium with the word "Eternity" shown in the middle of the bridge.

This segment was inspired by the then popular theatrical show Tap Dogs, and the soon to be released movie, Bootmen. Peewee Ferris's remix of the music was played as the performers slowly moved their way out of the stadium into the crowd.

- Segment Director & Designer: Nigel Triffitt
- Tap Choreographer: Dein Perry
- Choreographer:Doug Jack
- Airboard Choreographer: Jason Coleman
- Bridge Graphic Design: Ken Done

=== Sydney 2000 Olympic Band ===
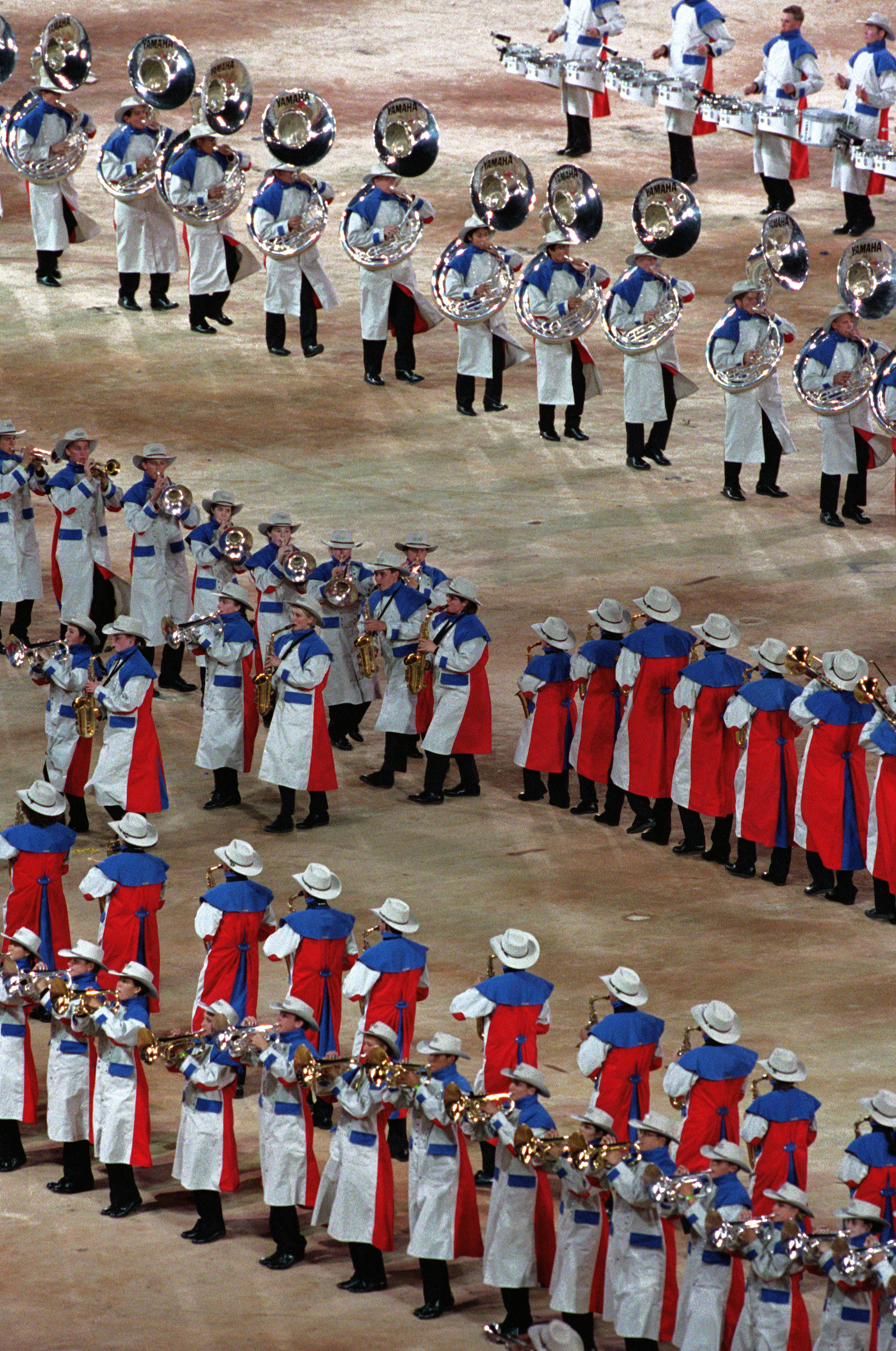
The Olympic Band performs

A massed marching band of 2,000 musicians performed a melody of Australian and international classics, and previous Olympic themes. It included "Also Sprach Zarathustra", "Chariots of Fire", "Ode to Joy", "Bugler's Dream", "Waltzing Matilda", and John Williams "Olympic Fanfare & Theme". The band consisted of 1,000 Australian musicians, with the remaining 1,000 musicians being from other countries around the world. There were trumpets, trombones, mellophones, baritones, sousaphones, flutes, piccolos, clarinets, alto, tenor, and baritone saxophones, snares, basses, multitenors, cymbals, and glockenspiels. The massed band was so large that six conductors were required for the segment. The band members wore Driza-Bone riding coats which had been especially modified for the band members. The band was one of the few live sound performances at the night.

Marching and wind bands have made regular appearances in Summer Olympic Ceremonies throughout the 20th Century. However, this segment was controversial in the lead up in the local media, as when it was announced in 1999, three-quarters of the band were from overseas while also ignoring Sydney based wind bands. The organisers had to renegotiate the number of international performer invitations for this segment so that half the band was made up of Australian performers on the night. Birch always envisioned the band to be both larger than anyone had seen at an Olympic ceremony, and for an international band to welcome international athletes. Reviews immediately after the ceremony stated that the band was so "skilled and entertaining in their fashion" that "it was hard to believe that their part was ever in doubt." In contrast, Peter FitzSimons opined that the band was a non-sequitur compared to the rest of the Australiana pageantry, and was seen as an element of cocacolanisation by some in Australia. Since 2000, marching and wind bands have not seen a major appearance at an Olympics opening ceremony, except for the Hellenic Naval Band during the entrance of the Presidents in the Athens ceremony in 2004, an appearance from the Grimethorpe Colliery Band during the Pandemonium segment of the London ceremony in 2012 and the Republican Guard marching band showing up for the Égalité segment of the Paris ceremony in 2024.

=== Parade of Nations ===
Once the Sydney 2000 Olympic Band made their introduction, they took their place in front of the ceremony stage, and volunteers formed patterns to begin the Parade of Nations. Twenty eight of the larger nations entered under a music piece of their country played by the Marching Band (such as Aquarela do Brasil was played for Brazil, Land of Hope and Glory was played for Great Britain, Sakura Sakura was played for Japan, Siyahamba was played for South Africa, Born in the USA/Stars and Stripes Forever for the United States, Triumphal March from Verdi's Aïda for Italy and Down Under for Australia), while smaller countries entered in with various Olympic Anthems, Percussion Cadences, and The Warriors as a nod to Australian wind band composer Percy Grainger. As is Olympic tradition, Greece entered first, and host nation Australia entered last.

As in the last Summer Olympics in Atlanta and the last Winter Olympics in Nagano, the countries entered in English alphabetical order. This was also to be seen during the next Olympics, in Salt Lake City.

A record of 199 nations entered the stadium with the exception of Afghanistan, a nation banned by the IOC in 1999 because of the then government's oppression on women and its sports. The parade of nations also featured a unified entrance by the athletes of both North and South Korea, holding a specially designed Unification flag. The two teams competed separately. Athletes from East Timor marched directly in the opening ceremonies as Individual Olympic Athletes and entered before the host nation. Without the existence of the National Olympic Committee, they were allowed to compete under the Olympic flag.

=== Dare To Dream ===
Australian music legends, singers John Farnham and Olivia Newton-John walked among the Olympic competitors and performed the theme song "Dare to Dream", which was written especially for the occasion by award-winning songwriters Paul Begaud, Vanessa Corish and Wayne Tester. Begaud and Corish are songwriting collaborators both born and raised in Sydney.

=== Opening Addresses ===
After a brief fanfare by David Stanhope, the President of the Sydney Organising Committee for the Olympic Games (SOCOG), Michael Knight, and the President of the IOC, Juan Antonio Samaranch made the opening addresses. In Knight's address, he spoke to the athletes directly about Australians love for sport, that while in the parade "the crowd cheered loudest for the home team, as it will at the sporting competitions," that "there is room in our hearts to support all of you wherever you have come from. Australians love sport, and we admire outstanding skill and courage." Samaranch gave a recognition of Indigenous Australians, by summarising the artistic section in these words: "I would like to express our respect to those who have made Australia what it is today, a great country, with a special tribute to the Aboriginal and Torres Strait Islander people."

The event was officially opened by Governor-General of Australia Sir William Deane. This was the first occasion that a Summer Olympics in Commonwealth realm was not opened by the monarch or a member of the Royal Family, although it was the second overall, behind the 1988 Winter Olympics. Originally, SOCOG and the IOC gave the green light for the then Prime Minister John Howard. However, in November 1999, he changed his mind and advised the IOC that the Governor-General should open the games. Howard said this was due to "a concern that my opening the Olympic Games would become a party political issue." This was a few days after the results of the 1999 Australian republic referendum was known.

"I declare open the Games of Sydney, celebrating the XXVII Olympiad of the modern era."

— HE The Hon Sir William Deane, AC KBE, Governor-General of the Commonwealth of Australia

=== Olympic Flag ===
Then 19-year-old pop star Vanessa Amorosi sang "Heroes Live Forever" to signify the legacy left by sports stars all over the world. The song was composed by John Gillard and Trevor White.

During the song, an enormous white flag the size of the stadium field was passed over the audience on the southern stand and was brought down over the crowd by volunteers. Whilst this happened, images of past sports legends were displayed on the flag. When the flag reached the athletes, a Dove of Peace was projected, followed by the Olympic Rings. This section was a partial recreation of a segment from the 1992 Summer Olympics opening ceremony, where a large Olympic flag covered the athletes.

The official Olympic Flag was then carried around the arena by eight former Australian Olympic champions: Bill Roycroft, Murray Rose, Liane Tooth, Gillian Rolton, Marjorie Jackson, Lorraine Crapp, Michael Wenden and Nick Green. It was then handed over to eight Australia's Federation Guard members, who carried and raised the flag. During the raising of the Olympic flag, the Olympic Hymn was sung in Greek by the Millennium Choir of the Greek Orthodox Archdiocese of Australia, representing Australia's large Greek population.

The Olympic Oaths were taken on behalf of the athletes by then captain of the Australian Women's Hockey Team Rechelle Hawkes, and on behalf of the officials by Australian Water Polo Referee Peter Kerr.

=== The Flame ===
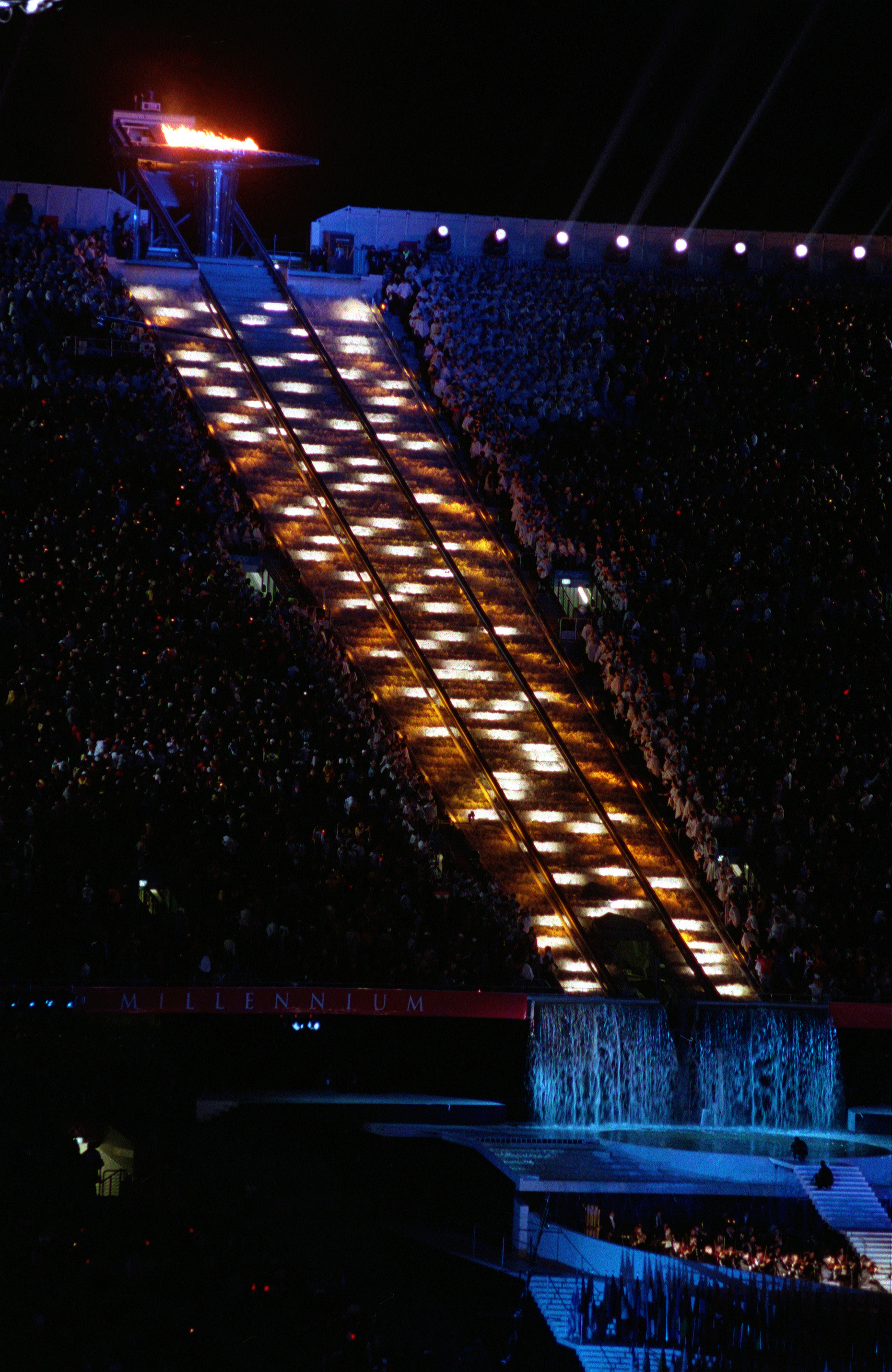
The Olympic Cauldron gains its final configuration

For the first time in recent Olympic history, the opening ceremony concluded with the lighting of the Olympic cauldron. Tina Arena, the Sydney Children's Choir and the Melbourne Symphony Orchestra performed The Flame, while showing footage of some highlights of the torch relay on the large screens, then cutting to live footage outside the stadium of Australian Olympic Gold Medalist Herb Elliott with the torch.

Then, celebrating 100 years of women's participation in the Olympics, all of the last torch bearers were women and Olympic Medalists: Betty Cuthbert and Raelene Boyle, Dawn Fraser, Shirley Strickland de la Hunty, Shane Gould and Debbie Flintoff-King was the last torchbearer inside the stadium track, before handing it over to Cathy Freeman. Freeman then climbed a long set of stairs towards a circular pool of water. She walked into the middle of the water and ignited the cauldron around her feet in a ring of fire. The cauldron then rose out from the water, above Freeman's head, and then was transported up a long waterfall, where it finally rested on a tall silver pedestal above the stadium as the ceremony concluded with a fireworks display. The final section of torchbearers and the lighting of the cauldron was accompanied by Te Deum by French composer Hector Berlioz, performed by the Sydney Symphony Orchestra, the Sydney Philharmonia Choir, and the Sing 2001 children's choir.

The planned climax to the ceremony was delayed by a technical glitch of a malfunctioned limit switch, which also severed the communications cable to override the program. This meant that the Olympic flame was suspended in mid-air for about four minutes, rather than immediately rising up the waterfall to the top of the stadium. In interviews after the ceremony, the organizers stated that when the cause of the problem was discovered, engineers overrode the program and the cauldron continued its course. 20 years later, some engineers stated it was fixed through a backup radio signal to the cauldron. Moreover, the gas bottles for the cauldron were close to empty before it was attached to a main gas line, and the backup flames were missing.

- Concept: Ric Birch, Michael Scott-Mitchell
- Segment Director: Richard Wherrett
- Cauldron Designer: Michael Scott-Mitchell

== Music ==
Music from the opening ceremony was released as an album that same year.

== Reviews ==
The ceremony was given rave reviews by the local media. IOC President Juan Antonio Samaranch thought it was a successful opening ceremony, giving it a 10-out-of-10 score. Then Premier of New South Wales Bob Carr claimed a few days after the ceremony that it was perhaps the most important work of art ever produced in Australia's history. The Sydney Morning Herald said, "It was daring. It was dignified. It was witty. It was breathtaking in its large-scale theatricality." Journalist Peter FitzSimons said that the atmosphere at the stadium that night was electric and said of the Artistic section that "it was a colourful and colossal kaleidoscope on overdrive, with Australia's cultural buttons being played like piano keys in the hands of a master." The Sunday Telegraph described it as a "truly great moment" in Australian history, going on to say that about the Awakening segment that it was "Australia's global declaration that it acknowledged its indigenous people and cared about their future, while feeling considerable regret – yes even sorrow – about the past." John Lombard from ABC News (Australia)|ABC News pointed out that having Cathy Freeman be the athlete to light the cauldron was a coup, as the extra symbolism of many white, Australian-born women passing the torch to an Aboriginal athlete "hit all the right buttons".

Foreign press reaction was also very positive; The New York Times also noted the themes of reconciliation given the political climate. The London Daily Express's Shekhar Bhatia described Webster as "the toast of the town and a global sensation". London's Daily Telegraph wrote that the "four-hour spectacle must be classified an unqualified success." The only negative review reported at the time was from The Washington Post, where Sally Jenkins described the ceremony as traditional, expensive and too long; as something that "a roving band of wild dogs couldn't cure." She did, however, go on to say that the lighting of the cauldron was "almost worth the price of admission" due to its symbolism of the nation's reconciliation.

== Legacy ==
A major theme in this ceremony was of reconciliation between Australia and the Australian Indigenous past. In the years leading up to the Olympics, Indigenous reconciliation was becoming a central social and political issue after the release of the Bringing Them Home report. In the ceremony's Media Guide, the author notes that four months earlier, during the Corroboree 2000 reconciliation event, 250,000 Australians of all backgrounds walked across Sydney Harbour Bridge as support for recognition of past wrongs towards the First Nations peoples. The Awakening segment was seen as a key critical segment to the ceremony by showing Indigenous dance and music in its own context for over 11 minutes and in a deep and significant way. Birch anecdotally pointed out that in the years after the ceremony there was an increase of Indigenous Australian Studies in NSW Public Schools curriculum. In later sporting events in Australia, similar segments were developed for the 2006 Commonwealth Games opening ceremony, and the 2018 Commonwealth Games opening ceremony started with a vision of Australian history from the point of view of the original people of the state of Queensland.

In November 2000, the television footage of Cathy Freeman lighting the cauldron was declared "the sporting image of the year" and won a "Golden Podum" by Sportel, a major international sports television convention held annually in Monaco. At the first Helpmann Awards the ceremony was awarded Best Special Event/Performance, Best Sound Design, and Best Costume Design for the Deep Sea Dreaming segment, and Best Scenic Design for the Awakening segment.

The Arts Unit of NSW Education played an important role in providing primary and high school children across NSW to perform at Olympic events. The Sydney 2000 Olympic Band continues as a secondary public school ensemble in New South Wales. Now named the NSW Public Schools Millennium Marching Band, the band performs at large-scale and televised events in both Australia and overseas. The smaller ensemble (consisting of around 100 members) traveled to Beijing for the 2001 Summer Universiade and 2008 Summer Olympics and performed in the United States in 2015 in San Francisco, Seattle and Los Angeles. The Sing 2001 choir continued to perform after the Olympics during major events in 2001 celebrating the Centenary of Australian Federation.

== Television coverage ==
Around 3.7 billion viewers from 220 countries watched the ceremony on TV. Viewership across Asia was double compared to the opening ceremony in Atlanta. Replays of the full length ceremony available online run at 4.5 hours.

- Host Broadcaster: Sydney Olympic Broadcasting Organisation (SOBO) – Director Peter Faiman
- Australia – Seven Network provided Australia's live broadcast of the opening ceremony which began at 6:30pm AEDT with half an hour of preparations live at the stadium. Hosts and commentators included Bruce McAvaney, Gary Wilkinson and Sandy Roberts. Added narration and commentary for the Indigenous segment "Awakening" was Wajarri actor and TV personality Ernie Dingo. There was one short ad-break was during the Marching Band segment. AC Nielsen reported a peak audience of over 10.4 million viewers not counting those watching from big screen sites.
- New Zealand – TVNZ viewers experienced a technical problem with their satellite feed during the "Prelude" and "Welcome" segments and therefore did not see the Countdown live. Moreover, the 1.3 million audience watched the ceremony on a short tape-delay so to allow for cuts to commercial breaks. This meant that the lighting of the cauldron was shown 40 minutes after the event happened.
- United Kingdom – BBC Television and Radio 5 Live covered the ceremony from 9am BST. BBC1 showed the coverage until 1pm when the coverage moved to BBC2 due to the overrun coverage. Steve Rider and Sue Barker hosted and Barry Davies was the commentator for the ceremony. 4 million watched the ceremony, which was a 53% share in the UK.
- United States – As general practice in the United States, NBC tape-delayed the ceremonies so it would air in primetime in the United States, as live programming would be aired during the early morning. AC Nielsen reported a peak audience of over 27.2 million viewers.

== See also ==
- 2000 Summer Olympics
- 2000 Summer Olympics closing ceremony
- 1982 Commonwealth Games opening ceremony
- 2006 Commonwealth Games opening ceremony
- 2018 Commonwealth Games opening ceremony
