= Nikki Webster =

Australian singer (born 1987)

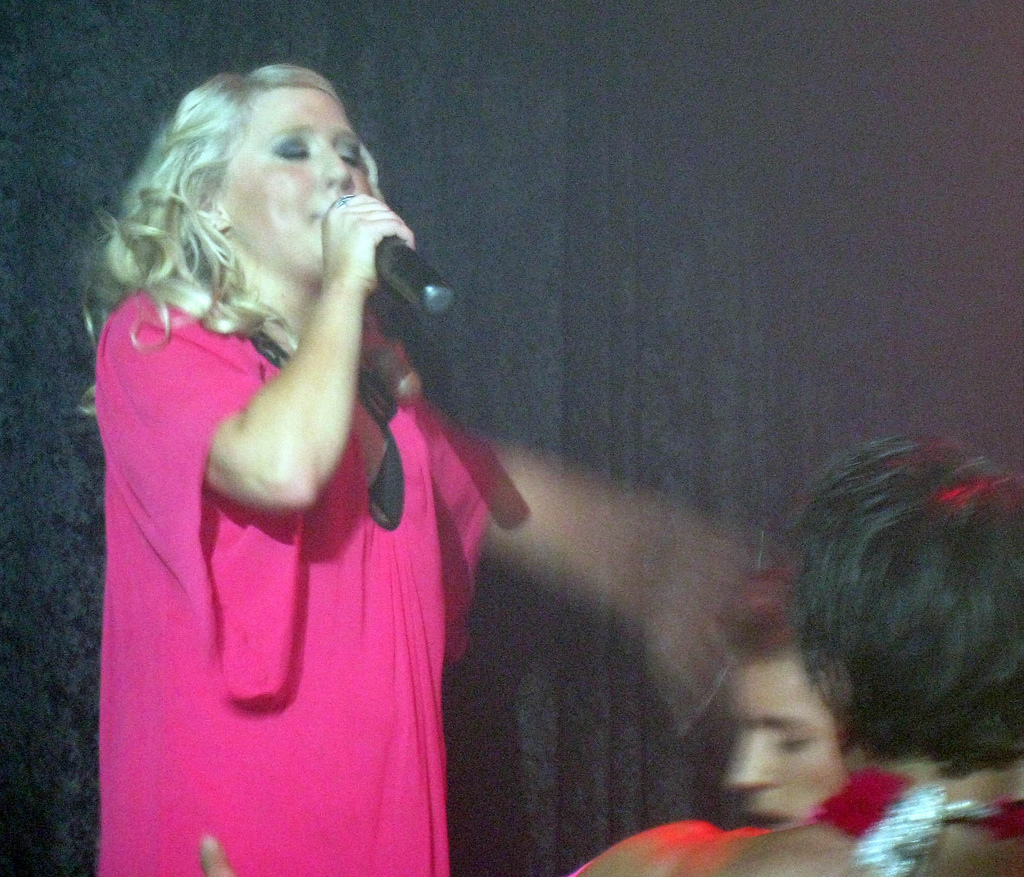

Background information
- Born: Nicole Marie Webster; 30 April 1987 (age 39); Sydney, New South Wales, Australia
- Genre: Pop
- Occupations: Singer, actress, dancer
- Years active: 1992–present
- Labels: Gotham (2001–2004); Piller Records (2006–2010); Spirit Music Group + Yummie Records (2012–present)
- Website: nikkiwebster.com.au

Nicole Marie Webster (born 30 April 1987) is an Australian pop singer. She is best known for her role in performing at both the 2000 Sydney Summer Olympics opening ceremony, and the 2000 Sydney Summer Olympics closing ceremony as well for her song "Strawberry Kisses", which made number 21 on the list of Top 25 singles in Australia released in 2001.

== Early life ==
Webster was born on 30 April 1987, to parents Tina and Mark Webster in Sydney, New South Wales. At a young age, she told her parents that she wanted to go into show business, so she started taking lessons. She attended MLC School in Burwood until year 10 and then attended the McDonald College of Performing Arts in Sydney.

== Early career ==
Webster's first acting role was as part of the ensemble cast in the pantomime Cinderella at the State theatre in Sydney, at the age of five. The production starred Jo Beth Taylor as Cinderella, Nancye Hayes as the Fairy Godmother, Lochie Daddo as the Prince, Bert Newton as The Baron, and Bruce Spence and Paul Blackwell as the Ugly Step-sisters. The following year she appeared in a production of Aladdin.

Webster appeared in television commercials including Twisties, Lay's chips and Campbell's Soup. At 10 years old, Webster played the Young Cosette in Les Misérables, and in 1999–2000 starred as Brigitta Von Trapp in a stage production of The Sound of Music, alongside Lisa McCune, John Waters and Bert Newton.

In March 2000, Webster auditioned for an unknown part in the 2000 Summer Olympics opening ceremony. In August, following an elimination process, she was told by opening ceremony artistic director and producer David Atkins that the role was hers.

At the age of 13, Webster played a major part in the opening ceremony, portraying the "Hero Girl" who was lifted above the stadium to simulate swimming among sea creatures, and then performing the song "Under Southern Skies". She also performed "We'll Be One" at the closing ceremony.

== Recording career ==
=== 2000–2004: Follow Your Heart, Bliss and Let's Dance ===
Webster signed a contract with BMG at the age of 13, after her success at the Olympics, and her first single "Strawberry Kisses" reached No. 2 on the Australian singles charts in 2001, holding the position for 7 weeks. Her debut album, Follow Your Heart, also went platinum, with the second single, "Depend on Me", going top 20, while the third single, "The Best Days"/"Over the Rainbow", reached No. 21. She also starred as Dorothy in an Australian stage performance of The Wizard of Oz, which ran between 2001 and 2002. Webster was nominated for an ARIA Award for Best Selling album and she won a John O'Keefe Encouragement Award at the 2001 Mo Awards.

Webster's 2002 BLISS album also went gold with a cover of American girl group P.Y.T.'s "Something More Beautiful" reaching No. 13 and going gold, while the second single "24/7 (Crazy 'bout Your Smile)" also reached the top 20.

Later, Webster released a cover version of "Dancing in the Street" by Martha and the Vandellas which reached the top twenty while her 2004 single "Let's Dance" reached the top 40 in Australia. A greatest hits album was released soon afterwards.

=== 2005–present ===
In early 2005, Webster hosted The Greatest Circus Acts of All Time on the Seven Network. She was announced as one of the contestants in season 2 of Dancing with the Stars. She was criticised for having an "unfair advantage" over other dancers because of her previous dancing experience. Webster and dance partner Sasha Farber were eliminated in week six of the series after judge Todd McKenney gave them a score of one out of 10. Webster appeared on the May 2005 cover of FHM after the magazine approached her to do the shoot as a celebration of turning 18. She was voted #7 in the FHM Australia 100 Sexiest Women 2005 list. Webster also appeared in one episode of Australian TV series Thank God You're Here as a cast member.

In 2006, Webster stated in interviews that she was living and working in Nashville, United States, writing with well-known writers working on her new album. It was also revealed she headed to Los Angeles to develop a new style of music heading for a more mature pop sound. In 2006, she modelled for the cover of Zoo Weekly to celebrate her 19th birthday.

In May 2007, Webster played the lead role of Sheila in a Perth production of the rock musical Hair along with Rob Mills and Cosima De Vito. In September 2007, Webster raised eyebrows by performing as a wind-up doll at the Sydney gay and lesbian dance party Sleaze Ball. This and her October 2006 photoshoot appearance in men's magazine FHM were seen as an attempt to mature her image, but attracted wide ridicule given her previous role in the 2000 Olympics. Webster regularly appeared on the show 20 to 1.

In January 2008, Webster announced she would be opening a performing arts school in February with brother Scott in a bid to help young people get into the industry. In January 2012 they opened a second school on the Central Coast, NSW. It was announced in May 2009 that Nikki was set to release her first new single in five years, "Devilicious", on 12 June. She performed "Devilicious" on The Morning Show in August 2009 in order to promote the single.

Webster made a guest appearance on 15 July 2009 episode of The Chaser's War on Everything, in a music video parody of the Barack Obama viral video "Yes We Can", the parody based on Kevin Rudd's speeches.

In February 2010, Webster and her brother Scott opened a talent and modeling agency for kids, Talent @ Nikki Webster.

Webster had a role in the 2012 independent feature Circle of Lies.

== Other work ==
In 2001, Webster was named the face of Jager Cosmetics' "It's a Girl Thing" range for young teens. She was featured on their website and in print ads.

Webster was approached by executives at Kmart to create her own range of clothing. The 'Nikki Webster' clothing and accessories range for girls aged between 5–10 was first released in stores in August 2003. She said, "My clothes are more about fun and they're all bright colours. I want kids to have fun and be individuals in my clothes." Webster designed the clothes herself and travelled to L.A. and London to "have a look at international fashion for inspiration."

In 2019, Webster appeared as a contestant on The Masked Singer Australia as Alien, and was voted off in the third episode.

== Personal life ==
Webster got engaged to Matthew McMah in January 2011, and they were married on 10 November 2012. They separated in 2018 and have two children together.

Webster owns a children's dance school with three studios in Sydney called "Dance At Nikki Webster".

== Discography ==
- Follow Your Heart (2001)
- Bliss (2002)
- Let's Dance (2004)
- Girls (2020)

== Performances ==
Film
Year	Title	Role	Notes
2012	Circle of Lies	V	One of the exclusives
Theatre
Year	Title	Role	Notes
1997–1998	[Les Miserables]	Little Cosette	
2001	The Wizard of Oz	Dorothy	Ran between 2001 and 2002.
2007	Hair	Sheila	Only in Perth, Western Australia
2007	Rent	Maureen	Only in Bunbury and Perth, Western Australia
Television
Year	Title	Role	Notes
2010	Sunday Night: Stars of Sydney	Herself	
2009	Talkin' 'bout your Generation	Herself	
2009	The Chaser's War on Everything	Herself	Sketch: "In Due Season" (a parody of "Yes We Can") from Series 3, Episode 6
2009	The Merrick & Rosso Show	Herself	Sketch: Australian Story Season 2, Episode 3 and Sketch: Celebrity Skip Gotcha! Season 2, Episode 9
Advertising
Year	Title	Role	Notes
2013	BPAY	Herself	
2001	Movie World	Herself	
19xx	Twisties	Herself	
19xx	Australian Toaster Biscuits	Herself	

== Awards and nominations ==
=== ARIA Music Awards ===
The ARIA Music Awards is an annual awards ceremony that recognises excellence, innovation, and achievement across all genres of Australian music. It commenced in 1987.

Year	Nominee / work	Award	Result
2001	"Strawberry Kisses"	Highest Selling Single	Nominated
2002	Follow Your Heart	Highest Selling Album	Nominated

=== Mo Awards ===
The Australian Entertainment Mo Awards (commonly known informally as the Mo Awards), were annual Australian entertainment industry awards. They recognise achievements in live entertainment in Australia from 1975 to 2016.

Year	Nominee / work	Award	Result (wins only)
2000	Nikki Webster	The Johnny O'Keefe Encouragement Award	Won

== Popular culture ==
Nerf Herder wrote a song about Webster that was included as a bonus track on their 2001 EP My E.P..
