= Strawberry Kisses =

2001 single by Nikki Webster

- Australian version

Single by Nikki Webster

from the album Follow Your Heart
- Released: 11 June 2001
- Length: 3:33
- Label: Gotham; BMG Music Australia
- Songwriters: Jeff Franzel; Andy Marvel; Marjorie Maye
- Producer: Chong Lim

Nikki Webster singles chronology
"We'll Be One" (2000)	"Strawberry Kisses" (2001)	"Depend on Me" (2001)

Alternative covers
- UK CD single cover

Music video
- "Strawberry Kisses" on YouTube

"Strawberry Kisses" is a song written by Jeff Franzel, Andy Marvel, and Marjorie Maye. It was produced by Chong Lim for Australian teen singer Nikki Webster, which also appears on her first album, Follow Your Heart (2001). It was released as the album's lead single on 11 June 2001 in Australia as a three-track CD single and in May 2002 in the United Kingdom with an additional track. Webster stated the song is "fresh, really bright and chirpy", and also said, "After I first heard the demo, I was singing it that night and I just thought that's a fantastic sign of a good song - something people remember".

"Strawberry Kisses" debuted at No. 2 on the Australian ARIA Singles Chart, stayed there for seven non-consecutive weeks, and ended 2001 at No. 21 on the Australian year-end chart. In the United Kingdom, the song reached number 64 in June 2002. In 2009, a poll run by Herald Sun voted "Strawberry Kisses" the fifth-worst Australian song of all time. An updated version of the track featuring Sam Mac, entitled "Strawberry Kisses 2017", was released in Australia on 16 March 2017. All proceeds of the song were donated to the Australian division of Starlight Children's Foundation.

The song was used as the Matildas' unofficial team song during the 2023 FIFA Women's World Cup. Webster performed the song for the Matildas in a surprise appearance at their public reception in Brisbane on 20 August 2023.

Webster revealed in 2023 that, despite strong sales, she earns no royalties for the song, as she did not write it, and her share of the profits are still being used to cover the cost of the music video, which, upon release, was the most expensive Australian music video ever made at the time.

== Chart performance ==
The song debuted on the Australian ARIA Singles Chart at number two on 18 June 2001, staying at that position for seven non-continuous weeks. After 14 weeks, it dropped out of the top 50, spending 14 weeks on the chart. The single was accredited with a platinum record for shipment of 70,000 copies by the ARIA. It appeared at number 21 on the ARIA year-end chart of 2001. The song was also released in New Zealand, where it peaked at number 40 and spent only one week on the chart, and in the United Kingdom, where it peaked at number 64 and stayed in the chart for that one week.

== Music video ==
The music video for "Strawberry Kisses" was directed by Mark Hartley. The video features Webster entering a spaceship and meets up with a computer-animated character called Digital Jimmy. Digital Jimmy (DJ) was created by Hartley, and Webster thought the idea was fantastic, and when she saw the basic drawing she fell in love with him. Digital Jimmy presses a button on a remote control, which changes Webster's outfit from a pink dress resembling her 2000 Summer Olympics opening ceremony costume, to pink crop top and pants. Webster then sings in a microphone for the first minute of the song, starts dancing, and then, as the song finishes, she leaves the spaceship and goes on another spaceship, ending the video. Webster stated that the back-up dancers in the video were her friends from her dance class.

== Track listings ==
Australian CD single

1. "Strawberry Kisses"
2. "Strawberry Kisses" (Fresh Kisses mix)
3. "Strawberry Kisses" (karaoke mix)

UK CD single

1. "Strawberry Kisses" (radio mix)
2. "Strawberry Kisses" (karaoke mix)
3. "Strawberry Kisses" (Fresh Kisses mix)

Dutch CD single

1. "Strawberry Kisses" (radio mix)
2. "Strawberry Kisses" (karaoke mix)

== Charts ==
=== Weekly charts ===
Chart (2001–2002)	Peak position
Australia (ARIA)	2
Belgium (Ultratop 50 Flanders)	44
Netherlands (Single Top 100)	58
New Zealand (Recorded Music NZ)	40
Scottish Singles Sales (Official Charts)	53
UK Singles (Official Charts)	64

=== Year-end charts ===
Chart (2001)	Position
Australia (ARIA)	21

== Certifications ==
Region	Certification	Certified units/sales
Australia (ARIA)	Platinum	70,000^{^}
^{^} Shipments figures based on certification alone.

== Release history ==
Region	Date	Format(s)	Label(s)	Ref.
Australia	11 June 2001	CD	Gotham; BMG Music Australia	
Denmark	15 April 2002	CD	Gotham; RCA	
Sweden	15 April 2002	CD	Gotham; RCA	
United Kingdom	27 May 2002	CD; cassette	RCA	

== Rouge version ==
"Beijo Molhado"

Single by Rouge

from the album Rouge
- Released: 19 January 2003
- Length: 3:30
- Label: Columbia; Sony
- Songwriters: Milton Guedes; Jeff Franzel; Andy Marvel; Marjorie Maye
- Producer: Rick Bonadio

Rouge singles chronology
"Ragatanga" (2002)	"Beijo Molhado" (2003)	"Brilha La Luna" (2003)

A Portuguese-language version of the song titled "Beijo Molhado" (lit. "Wet Kiss") was performed by the Brazilian girl group Rouge, released as the third and final single the band's debut studio album, self-titled Rouge (2002), on 19 January 2003. The song was produced by Rick Bonadio, and its lyrics were written by Milton Guedes.

"Beijo Molhado" talks about a love of summer that was marked, and the protagonist of the song sings about the desire to kiss the loved one again. The song was released early in 2003, replacing "Ragatanga" on the radios.

=== Background and release ===
Following the success of "Ragatanga", which was more than 2 months at the top of the charts, Sony Music decided to release the third official single from the album. Since "Ragatanga" was still booming, the record company decided to release a more lively song that followed the dance line of "Ragatanga", thus opting for "Beijo Molhado", which was released in early 2003.

A Spanish version, entitled "Beso Mojado", was made for the album "Rouge En Español", but the album was not released due to Luciana leaving. Even so, the song was released on the internet.

=== Composition and lyrics ===
In the Portuguese version, written by Milton Guedes and produced by Rick Bonadio, the song talks about a love of summer having already been finished, and the protagonist can not forget the person loved, desiring their "wet kisses".

The song starts with a voice off singing, "Quero tanto, espero tanto, seu beijo molhado," ("I want you so much, I hope so much, your kiss wet,") while Karin sings, "demais, oh oh oh, yeah, yeah." ("too much, oh oh oh, yeah, yeah.") The first stanza is also sung by Karin, where it is spoken of an unforgettable summer love. The second stanza is sung by Luciana, where she sings about wanting to find that passion again, since she does not just stay. In the chorus, the girls sing, "Eu quero tanto seu beijo molhado Seus lábios de mel, Que me deixaram louca, Eu vou te dar um beijo molhado Eu sei que vou trazer Você pra mim." ("I want your wet kiss so much Your honey lips, That drove me crazy, I'm gonna give you a wet kiss, I know I'll bring you to me.") After the refrain, Patricia talks about not being able to sleep due to this intense passion. Fantine then sings, saying that even though she does not know if it's love, she wants to see that passion again. At the bridge of the song, Luciana sings again, in addition to doing "ad-libs." During the last two choruses, Aline does ad-libs in the song.

=== Track listing ===
CD single

1. "Beijo Molhado" (album version) – 3:28
2. "Beijo Molhado" (radio edit)
3. "Beijo Molhado" (Cuca Elektro remix) – 3:40
4. "Beijo Molhado" (Cuca Wet club mix) – 5:03
5. "Beijo Molhado" (Cuca techno mix)
6. "Beijo Molhado" (Cuca radio mix)
7. "Beijo Molhado" (Cuca house mix)
