= Let's Dance (Nikki Webster song) =

Single by Nikki Webster

from the album Let's Dance
- Released: June 2004
- Genre: Pop; dance
- Length: 3:58
- Label: BMG
- Songwriter(s): Delta Goodrem; Mark Holden; Axel Breitung
- Producer(s): Chong Lim

Nikki Webster singles chronology
| "Dancing in the Street" (2003) | "Let's Dance" (2004) | "Devilicious" (2009) |

Music video
- "Let's Dance" on YouTube

"Let's Dance" is a song by Nikki Webster, released as the second single from her third album Let's Dance, released in 2004. It was written by Delta Goodrem, Mark Holden and Axel Breitung. It peaked at No. 37 on the ARIA Singles Chart in June 2004.

== Music video ==
The music video for "Let's Dance" was directed by Paul Varolo and filmed at The McDonald College. It shows children following an arrow to 'Nikki Webster "Let's Dance" Audition' and rehearsing the dance routine with Webster. For the last 50 seconds of the video, a smaller group of dancers perform the routine in costume. A Current Affair ran a story and interview about Nikki shooting her new music video.

When Webster appeared on Video Hits to promote the single, she taught the dance to host Axle Whitehead, and on So Fresh to hosts Elysia Pratt and David Whitehill.

== Live performances ==
Webster performed "Let's Dance" at the Australia Day Eve concert in Canberra, more than four months before the single's release. The performance is included on The Best of Nikki Webster DVD.

Webster also performed the song on Good Morning Australia on 9 June 2004.

== Track listing ==
1. "Let's Dance" – 3:58
2. "Let's Dance" (karaoke mix) – 3:58
3. "Let's Dance" (video) – 3:58

== Charts ==
| Chart (2004) | Peak position |
|---|---|
| Australia (ARIA) | 37 |
| Australian Artist Singles (ARIA) | 12 |
