= Depend on Me =

Single by Nikki Webster

from the album Follow Your Heart
- Released: 3 September 2001
- Recorded: 2001
- Genre: Pop
- Label: BMG
- Songwriters: A. Hansson; S. Diamond
- Producer: Chong Lim

Nikki Webster singles chronology
"Strawberry Kisses" (2001)	"Depend on Me" (2001)	"The Best Days" (2001)

Music video
- "Depend on Me" on YouTube

"Depend on Me" is the second song released by Nikki Webster from her debut album Follow Your Heart. It peaked at number 16 on the Australian ARIA Singles Chart in September 2001. Webster also performed "Depend on Me" on Good Morning Australia on 23 August 2001, with dancers Kaylie and Steph.

== Music video ==
The music video for "Depend on Me" features Webster meeting up again with a little cartoon character called Digital Jimmy who first appeared in Webster's Strawberry Kisses. Digital Jimmy (DJ) was created by Hartly, and Webster thought the idea was fantastic and when she saw the basic drawing she fell in love with him. Webster is on her laptop in her bedroom when she receives a text from her friend Kaylie saying, "I need cheering up." She meets up with her friends and they go to Kaylie's house and together perform dance routines, try on clothes, do Kaylie's hair and make-up, look through photo albums and have pillow fights while cartoon character Digital Jimmy joins in. Comedian Doug Chappel has a cameo appearance as Kaylie's father at the end of the music video to find the girls' bedroom full of feathers from the pillow fights.

== Track listing ==
1. "Depend on Me"
2. "Depend on Me" (Jumpin' Mix)
3. "Individuality"
4. "Depend on Me" (Video)

== Charts ==
Chart (2001)	Peak position
Australia (ARIA)	16
