= The Best Days =

2001 single by Nikki Webster

Single by Nikki Webster

from the album Follow Your Heart
- B-side: "Over the Rainbow"
- Released: 3 December 2001
- Length: 3:38
- Label: BMG
- Songwriters: Mark Holden; Axel Breitung
- Producer: Chong Lim

Nikki Webster singles chronology
"Depend on Me" (2001)	"The Best Days" (2001)	"Something More Beautiful" (2002)

Music video
- "The Best Days" on YouTube

"The Best Days" is the third single released by Australian singer Nikki Webster from her debut album, Follow Your Heart (2001). It peaked at number 21 on the Australian ARIA Singles Chart in December 2001. The second track on the CD single includes a cover of "Over the Rainbow" from The Wizard of Oz.

The music video was filmed at Stradbroke Island in Queensland over a three-day period. Webster's older brother Scott appears in the music video, riding on a jet ski with her.

== Track listing ==
#	Australian CD single	Length
Single
1.	"The Best Days" (radio mix)	3:58
2.	"Over the Rainbow"	3:02
3.	"Strawberry Kisses" (video)	
4.	"Depend on Me" (video)	

== Charts ==
Chart (2001)	Peak position
Australia (ARIA)	21
