= Stockwhip =

Type of whip

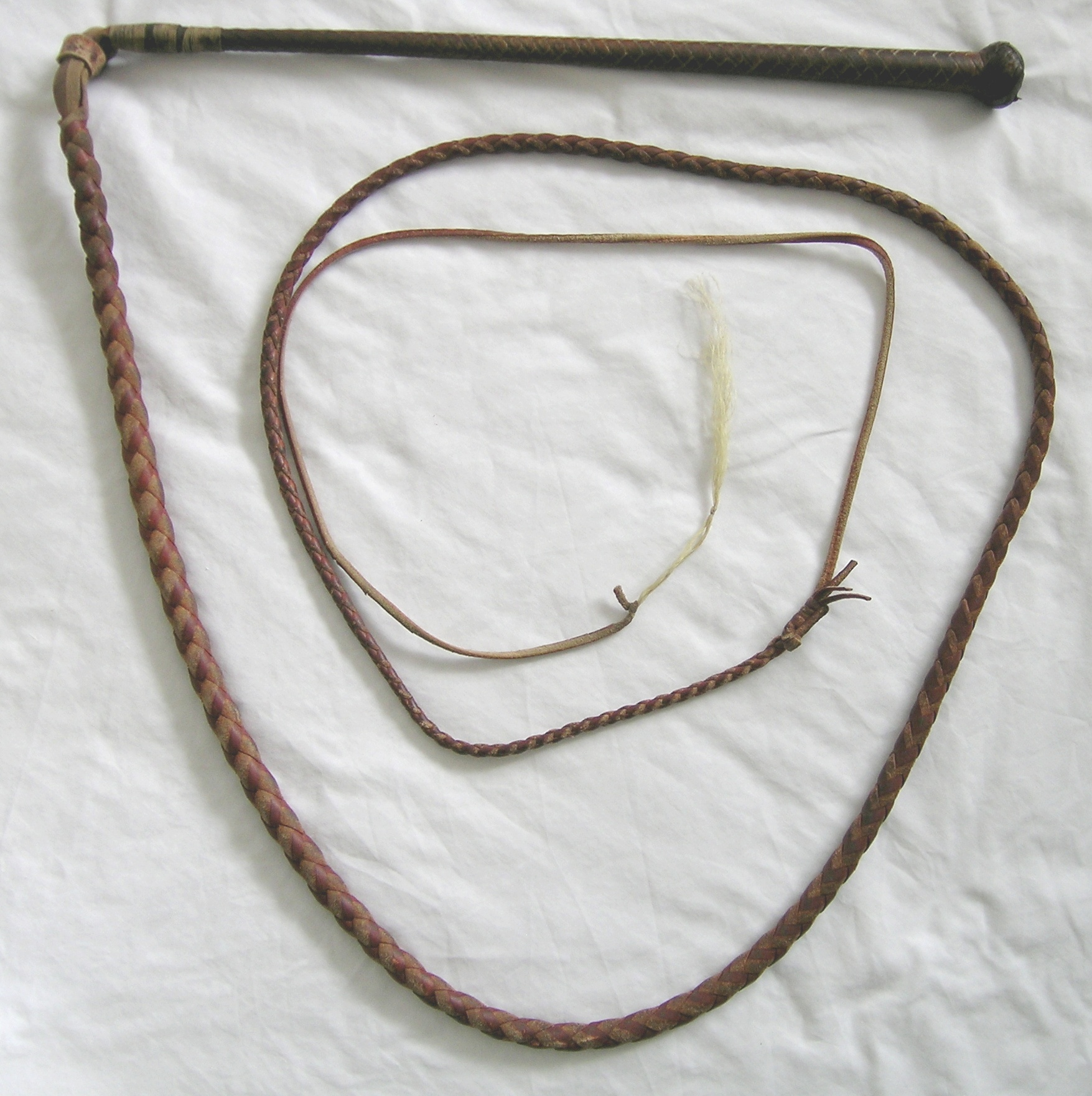
A redhide stockwhip with a full plaited handle.

A stockwhip is a type of whip made of a long, tapered length of flexible, plaited leather or nylon with a stiff handle and thong able to pivot along the handle easily. Stock whips are used when rounding up cattle.

== Origin and uses ==
The Australian stockwhip is said to have originated from the English hunting whip, but has evolved into an entirely new type of whip. It was designed to move mobs of cattle by making it crack, which would encourage the mob to keep moving. It is not usually used for sheep. Throughout Australia stockmen and drovers have used the stockwhip since the early 19th century and it is still the preferred whip used by Australian cattlemen and women today.

The stockwhip is part of most mounted stockmen's equipment and may be used to keep in contact with other riders, as a weapon against a snake, to lead a horse or dog, or as a counter - by tying one knot for every one hundred head of livestock counted. A stockwhip is part of the regulation equipment in stockman challenges and some Australian Stock Horse events. Competitions known as a "stockman’s chop" are held in which a rider must canter down a row of pegs with paper pieces attached and "chop" these pieces off with the whip. Whipcracking events are a popular form of competition for juniors through to older family members.

== Composition of an Australian stockwhip ==
Unlike the American equivalent (Florida Cow Whip which is made of inexpensive nylon) an Australian stockwhip is usually made of redhide or sometimes greenhide leather but can also be made of kangaroo hide. Because a kangaroo is a native animal, and cattle are a lot cheaper and abundant, kangaroo hide stockwhips are more expensive. Only the most expensive whips are made from kangaroo hide and they often have a fully plaited handle. Kangaroo hide allows the whip maker to produce the fine plaits for which the kangaroo leather stockwhip is renowned.

== Sizes of Australian Stockwhips ==
The size of Australian stockwhips are measured by the length of the thong (length doesn't include stock, keeper, fall or cracker). Australian stockwhips can be as short as 3 feet (child's whip) or as long as 10 feet (3 metres). The standard Australian stockwhip is 6 feet (1.8 metres) long. Stronger people generally prefer a larger and heavier whip to be used on horseback. Small and light whips that are designed for crowded environments such as cattle yards are called yard whips. Yard whips are swift and easy to use.

== Parts of an Australian Stockwhip ==
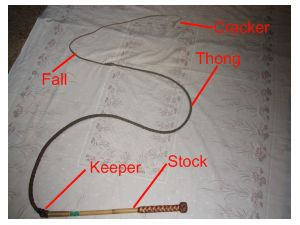
Stockwhip Parts

The five parts of the Australian Stockwhip are the stock (the handle), the keeper, the thong, the fall and the cracker.

=== The stock ===
The stock is usually made of cane and usually has a part plaited leather grip. The stock of an Australian stockwhip is usually longer than the bullwhip. The most noticeable difference between a bullwhip and an Australian stockwhip is that the handle of a stockwhip is not integrated into the thong. Instead the handle is attached to the thong by a keeper, to stop the thong from slipping off. The advantages of this design are many but is mainly that the stock can be easily replaced if it falls off. However it may be difficult to put on if it falls off.

=== The keeper ===
The keeper is the part of the whip that connects the stock to the thong. The keeper is made of a wide strip of leather passing over the end of the whip handle. It loops through end of the thong and is then joined to the stock.

=== The thong ===
The thong is the long, plaited section of whip. Redhide whips are usually made of four plaits due to ease and speed of construction but some people prefer 6 plait. A kangaroo hide whip is made, usually, with 8 or 12 plaits, but can be made even finer by cutting the strands narrower prior to construction. This doesn't make a better whip, just a finer and more costly one. The thong is the part of a stockwhip that is measured.

=== The fall ===
The fall is a single piece of tapered rawhide or redhide leather which is about 60 centimetres (24 inches) long and attached to the end of the thong. The fall suffers the most wear and tear of the whip because the movement of a whip is faster towards the end due to the whip's tapered design. The fall is weaker than the thong because it is only a single strand (not plaited). It is essential for a whip owner to have a decent, high quality fall attached to their whip.

=== The cracker ===
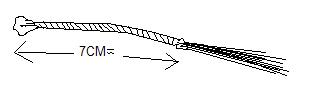
A cracker, part of a stockwhip

The cracker (in the US called a popper), is a twisted piece of short rope (approx 10 cm) with a frayed end. The cracker is essential and keeps the whip in good condition, and also aids in producing the crack. A cracker is frequently replaced, according to need and the discretion of the whip user, and may be made of cord or horsehair. Crackers are often made from hay band (also known as baling twine) which is easy to find and make into a cracker, and is also a cheap alternative to buying a pre-made cracker.

== Cracking techniques ==
The main techniques used when whipcracking are the cattleman's crack and round yard. The sound is created when the velocity of the cracker breaks the sound barrier and creates a sonic boom. The cracker at top speed can achieve more than three times the speed of sound.

=== Cattleman's crack ===
The whip is swung backwards over the shoulder and then forward.

=== Round Yard (Over-Head Crack) ===
The whip cracker spins the whip anti-clockwise (if right-handed) over his or her head. When the whip is approximately 90 degrees to the right of the whip cracker, he or she swings the whip in the opposite direction. It is one of the simplest techniques, yet it can be one of the loudest used in whip cracking.
