= Radium (Australian horse) =

Australian campdrafting horse

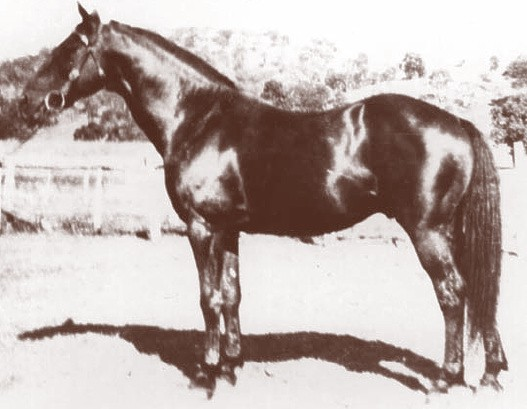
Radium (1918-1947)

Radium was an outstanding Australian bred campdrafter and very influential ancestor of Australian Stock Horses. He was a bay stallion bred by Donald Beaton of Levedale, Gloucester, New South Wales. This son of the outstanding campdrafter, Cecil (1899, by Red Gauntlet from Meretha II) from Black Bess by Hukatere (1882) was foaled on 11 November 1918. Beaton took great care in the breeding of his horses requiring horses with ability and stamina, for which he culled heavily. Radium’s sire, Cecil was so successful that in 1913, his owner, Arch Simpson was asked to leave his champion campdrafter at home in order that other competitors had a chance to win the campdrafting event at Geary’s Flat Bushman’s Carnival.

Radium was broken in by Archie Grant and William Tout when he was a two-year-old, after which he had several trips to the Cooplacurripa area. He began to show his exceptional ability as a stock horse as he developed and matured. Donald Beaton often drove long distances to compete at bushman’s carnivals with Radium tied behind the buggy. Radium would then compete in the campdraft, often winning and if he was going well, round off his success with an exhibition of campdrafting without a bridle.

In circa 1928, Radium was sold to Herb O’Neil, who, as a friend of Donald Beaton, had ridden the horse in competitions for Beaton when he had been unable to get away from his property. Herb O’Neill competed extensively with Radium, winning over a large area of the state. Just prior to the Second World War (WWII), Radium won a Championship Campdraft at Kempsey, New South Wales with the next ten placings going to Radium’s sons and daughters. Radium was also highly successful in led contests for the best type of Stock Horse. During WWII, at a Dungog Bushman’s Carnival over 20 horses were competing in the led stock horse class. In this event Radium received the first placing with the remaining four all being his sons.

Radium stood at stud on "Kunderang Station" (now part of Oxley Wild Rivers National Park) for much of his life and had at least thirteen of his sons appear in Australian Stock Horse pedigrees. Quite a few horses had a double cross or were line-bred to this great foundation sire.

His son, Chan was one of the smartest horses seen in a cattle camp and was a good sire. Another son, Dimray foaled in 1938 was a brilliant campdrafter and when retired to stud, he carried on the Radium tradition of producing top stock horses and campdrafters. It was as a sire that Dimray had a tremendous influence with his son Reality, his grandson Rivoli Ray and his great grandson, Cecil Bruce being Hall of Fame inductees.

Radium died on 12 November 1947, at 29 years of age, of a genital malignancy. This was the end of the life of a truly great horse, but he was also the foundation of a great line of horses.

== See also ==
- List of historical horses
- Campdrafting
- Muster (livestock)
- Stock horse
- Stockman (Australia)
- Waler horse
