= Bullwhip =

Single-tailed whip

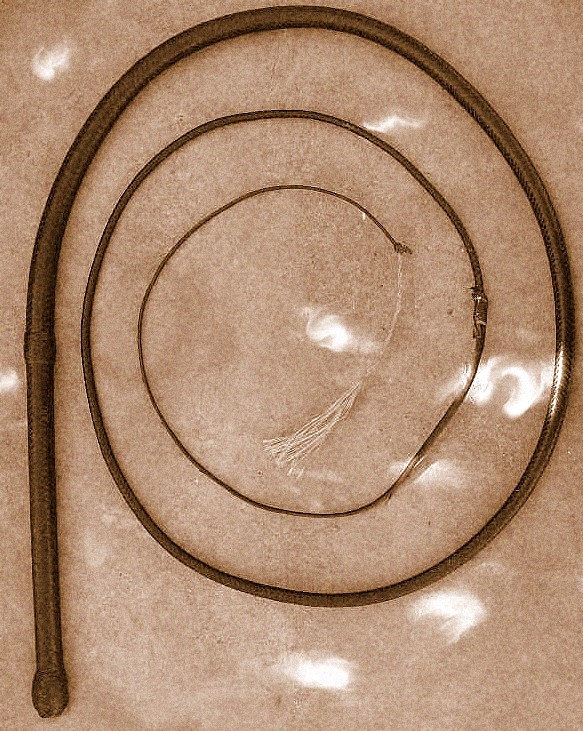
- A bullwhip
- Types: Whip, pastoral, hand tool
- Used with: Livestock

A bullwhip is a single-tailed whip, usually made of braided leather or nylon, designed as a tool for working with livestock or for competition cracking.

Bullwhips are pastoral tools, traditionally used to control livestock in open country. A bullwhip's length, flexibility, and tapered design allows it to be thrown in such a way that, toward the end of the throw, part of the whip exceeds the speed of sound—thereby creating a small sonic boom. The bullwhip was rarely, if ever, used to strike cattle, as this could inflict damage to the animal. Instead, the whip was cracked near the animal to startle and guide them, encouraging movement in the desired direction.

The cracking sound is of a sonic boom. This is most likely the first item used by humans to go faster than the speed of sound.

The bullwhip should not be confused with the stockwhip, an Australian whip also used to control livestock but having a somewhat different structure.

== History ==
There are claims the bullwhip was developed in South America where, like "cow-whips" during the slave trade, it was used as a weapon, or that it arrived there from Spain, but Roman mosaics and earthenware dating to around the 2nd and 3rd centuries AD show what appear to be tapered drop-lash whips, rather than the two-piece whips often associated with the Romans and other ancient cultures.

During the late 19th and early 20th centuries, as rural economies became increasingly mechanized, demand for all types of whips diminished. By the middle of the 20th century, bullwhip making was a dying craft, with only a few craftsmen left making good quality whips.

In the later half of the 20th century, attempts to preserve traditional crafts, along with a resurgence of interest in Western performance arts and the release of films featuring whips, such as Raiders of the Lost Ark, led to an increased interest in whip cracking as a hobby and performance art, as well as a competitive sport. Whip cracking competitions focus on the completion of complex multiple cracking routines and precise target work; although other whips are also used in such competitions.

Whereas, in times past, the bullwhip was designed for one basic, main purpose, modern whip makers design their whips for different specific purposes and to suit different throwing styles. Regardless of their intended end use, all bullwhips have certain common features.

== Description ==
A bullwhip consists of a handle section, a thong, a fall, and a cracker. A wrist loop may also be present, although its chief purpose is for hanging one's whip on a hook. Aesthetically, it finishes the handle.

The main portion of the bullwhip's length is made up of a braided body or thong. Made of many strips of leather or nylon, the number of braids or plaits is an important factor in the construction of the whip. Often the thong is multi-layered, having one or more "bellies" in the center. Quality whips have at least two bellies, made of braided leather like the surface of the whip, although with fewer plaits. Lower-quality whips may have no bellies at all, and are sometimes stuffed with materials such as newspaper or electrical tape, which will break down with use. Unlike in the Australian stock whip, the thong connects in line with the handle (rather than with a joint), or sometimes completely covers the handle.

The handle is usually short, being between 20 and 30 cm (8 and 12 in) long. While some whips have an exposed wooden grip, others have an intricately braided leather- or nylon-covered handle. Leather-covered handles usually contain a butt foundation, which is held in the palm of the hand when cracking, and can have a wrist loop, used for hanging the whip at the end of the day, not for putting around the wrist during use. Nylon handles usually have a Turk's knot at the end and may have a loop; they also might have a pattern thanks to nylon being available in many colors. Some handles swivel, making it easier to do certain types of unsophisticated cracks but making it harder to do others, or to use the whip for any type of accurate targeting. The Australians introduced a longer-handled bullwhip to the US, where the bullwhips traditionally had shorter handles. The longer-handled whip, with a handle of 25–35 cm (10–14 in), functions like a cross between a stockwhip and a bullwhip, and is referred to as a "Target Whip."

Bullwhips are usually measured from the butt of the handle to the end of the plaiting of the thong. The thong typically terminates at a fall hitch—a series of half hitches that neatly tie the (replaceable) fall (or tail) to the whip. Bullwhips range in length from 1 metre (3 ft) to very long bullwhips of 6 metres (20 ft), with some examples being even longer.

A fall is a single piece of leather or nylon cord between 25 and 75 cm (10 and 30 in) in length. It was traditionally made to be replaceable due to the extreme stresses the very end of the whip was subjected to as it was "cracked". In lesser-quality whips, the fall can also be a continuation of one of the strands used in plaiting the overlay, or it can be an extension of the core of the whip, with the strands from the overlay tied off, and the core continuing on as the fall. But these types of falls aren't replaceable, and thus are seen as impractical.

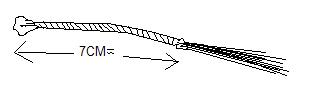
A cracker, which is part of a bullwhip or stockwhip.

Tied to the end of the flexible fall is an even more flexible piece called the cracker, popper or "cat-tail". Some sources state that the cracker is the portion of the whip that makes the loud noise known as the sonic boom. A whip will create a cracking sound without a cracker, but the sound will be much less loud. It has been suggested that the frayed end of the cracker may cause more fibers to move at supersonic speeds, increasing the likelihood of a sonic boom. It has also been found that when a whip is cracked, the cracker moves in an arc at the end of the whip. Instead of moving smoothly as the end of the whip up to the cracker does, the cracker suddenly flips around the end of the whip, amplifying the acceleration experienced there. This flipping motion is necessary for a sonic boom to be produced by the cracker. Cracking a whip causes wear to the cracker, and well-used whips frequently require new crackers. Crackers can be made of horsehair, twine, string, nylon, polypropylene, silk, polyester or any number of materials. There are several methods of tying the cracker to the fall, usually using a lark's head knot as the basis, since it tightens on itself when the whip is cracked, reducing the chance the cracker will slip from the fall and fly off.

Bullwhips come in many different weights, materials, and designs. Some light whips use shot-loading or lead weights for balance. While usually made of strips of leather, nylon whips (often using paracord) have become popular; they were initially developed for use in the wetlands of Florida, where leather is difficult to maintain (hence the name "Florida Cow Whip"), but have recently gained in popularity because they are less expensive than leather. Formerly in America, regular cowhide, rawhide and oxhide leathers were most commonly used for the construction of bullwhips because they were readily available. They tend to be quite thick and sturdy and are good for harsh conditions. Some whip-crackers doing target work prefer a whip made of kangaroo skin and kangaroo hide is preferred by whip makers because it is many times stronger than cow hide and can be cut into fine, strong laces allowing for more intricate braiding patterns that could previously only be achieved with rawhide, which is much harder to work with.

== Use as hunting weapon ==
Simon Tookoome, a Canadian Inuk and expert bullwhip handler, was known to have used one to hunt ptarmigans and caribou, and to kill a wolf:

Tookoome took the advice to heart and began hunting bigger animals [than ptarmigans] with the whip, even after his family acquired a rifle and a snowmobile. He took down several caribou, and once even used it to kill a wolf that he had shot and injured. He kept the whip with him because operating a rifle was too expensive.

— Edmonton Journal (December 18, 2005)

== In popular culture ==
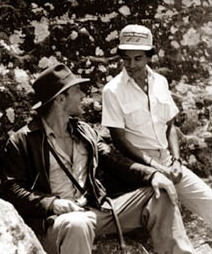
Harrison Ford with bullwhip in lap as Indiana Jones (left) in Indiana Jones and the Temple of Doom.

The bullwhip has been featured as the signature weapon for the character of Indiana Jones in the Indiana Jones film series.

== See also ==
- Bullwhip effect
- Sjambok
- Urumi

== Bibliography ==
- Conway, Andrew (2005). The New Bullwhip Book. Loompanics Unlimited. ISBN 1-55950-244-4.
- Morgan, David (March 2004). Whips and Whipmaking (2nd ed.). Cornell Maritime Press. ISBN 0-87033-557-X.
- Dante, Robert (Oct 2008). Let's Get Cracking! The How-To Book of Bullwhip Skills (1st ed.). R Dante. ISBN 978-1-4404-0623-2.
- Edwards, Ron (1999). How to Make Whips. Cornell Maritime Press. ISBN 0-87033-513-8.
- Morgan, David (2007). Whips of the West. Cornell Maritime Press. ISBN 978-0-87033-589-1.
