= Whipcracking =

Act of producing a cracking sound with a whip

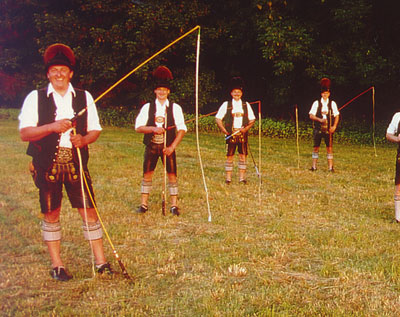
Whipcrackers from Traunstein, Bavaria

Whipcracking is the act of producing a cracking sound through the use of a whip. Originally done in livestock driving and horse riding, it has come into use as a practice of its own. A rhythmic whipcracking belongs to the traditional culture among various Germanic peoples of Bavaria (Goaßlschnalzen), in parts of the Alps (Aperschnalzen), and in Austria and Hungary (Ostorozás). Today it is a performing art, a part of rodeo show in United States, a competitive sport in Australia, and an increasingly popular activity in the United Kingdom, where it crosses boundaries of sport, hobby, and performance.

== Physics ==
The crack a whip makes is produced when a section of the whip moves faster than the speed of sound creating a small sonic boom. The creation of the sonic boom was confirmed in 1958 by analysis of high-speed shadow photography taken in 1927. Despite attempts to derive the behavior from physical conservation of energy, it has been objected that the energy is also conserved when the crack sizzles rather than cracks. Similarly, derivation from conservation of momentum and other such laws is insufficient. Recently, an additional, purely geometrical factor was recognized: the tip of the whip moves twice as fast at the loop of the whip, just as the top of a car's wheel moves twice as fast as the car itself. Further, simulations suggest that the high speed of the tip of the whip results from a "chain reaction of levers and blocks".

In 1997, Discover Magazine reported about the possibility of the "whipcracking" effect millions of years ago. As part of the joint computer scientists' and paleontologists' research into the motion of dinosaurs, Nathan Myhrvold, a chief technology officer from Microsoft, carried out a computer simulation of an Apatosaurus, which had a very long, tapering tail resembling a whip. Basing on the reasoning described above, Myhrvold concluded that sauropods were capable of producing a crack comparable to the sound of a cannon. However, in 2022 a more sophisticated model revealed that while some diplodocid dinosaurs could possibly have used their tails as whips, they wouldn't have been able to break the sound barrier. At that speed the caudal vertebrae of the sauropods at the posterior end would simply break.

== Shows and competitions ==
=== Goaßlschnalzen ===
Goaßlschnalzen, Goaßlschnalzn, Goasslschnoizen is translated as "whip-cracking", from the Bavarian word Goaßl (German: Geißel) for coachwhip. In earlier centuries, the carriage drivers used elaborate crack sequences to signal their approach and to identify them. Over time horse-drawn transport dwindled, but the tradition remained, and coaches practiced their skill in their spare time.

Today the Goaßlschnalzer ("whipsnappers") do concert performances, often as bands that include conventional musical instruments. Whipsnapping is also a traditional sport in Bavaria. There are many whip-cracking associations in Bavaria.

=== Aperschnalzen ===
Aperschnalzen or Apaschnoizn in Bavarian is an old tradition of competitive whipcracking revived in the first half of the 20th century. The word "aper" means "area free of snow", and it has been thought that this tradition had a pagan meaning of "driving the winter away" by whipcracking.

=== British Whipcracking Convention ===
A British Whipcracking Convention is held every year for all skill levels. There are workshops for the differing skill levels as well as competitions and targets. The third convention was held in Aldersley Leisure Village, Aldersley Road, Wolverhampton on 14 July 2007.

=== Australian sport ===
In the latter half of the 20th century, attempts to preserve traditional crafts, along with a resurgence of interest in Western performance arts and the release of films such as Raiders of the Lost Ark (in which the hero, Indiana Jones, uses a bullwhip as a tool), led to an increased interest in whipcracking as a hobby and performance art, as well as a competitive sport. Whip cracking competitions have become popular in Australia. They focus on the completion of complex, multiple-cracking routines and precise target work. Various whips, apart from bullwhips, are used in such competitions. The most common whip used in Australian competitions is an Australian stockwhip, a whip unique to Australia.

- Target routines
  - target cutting
  - object wrapping
  - object moving/manipulation
- Cracking routines
  - Cracking patterns
  - Cracking with two whips

In cracking routines, the judging criteria are the presentation and making audible cracks in prescribed moments.

== See also ==
- Bullwhip
- Beto Carrero
- Crack the whip
- John Brady
- Indiana Jones
- Fiona Smith
- Stockwhip
- Whip fighting
