= Aperschnalzen =

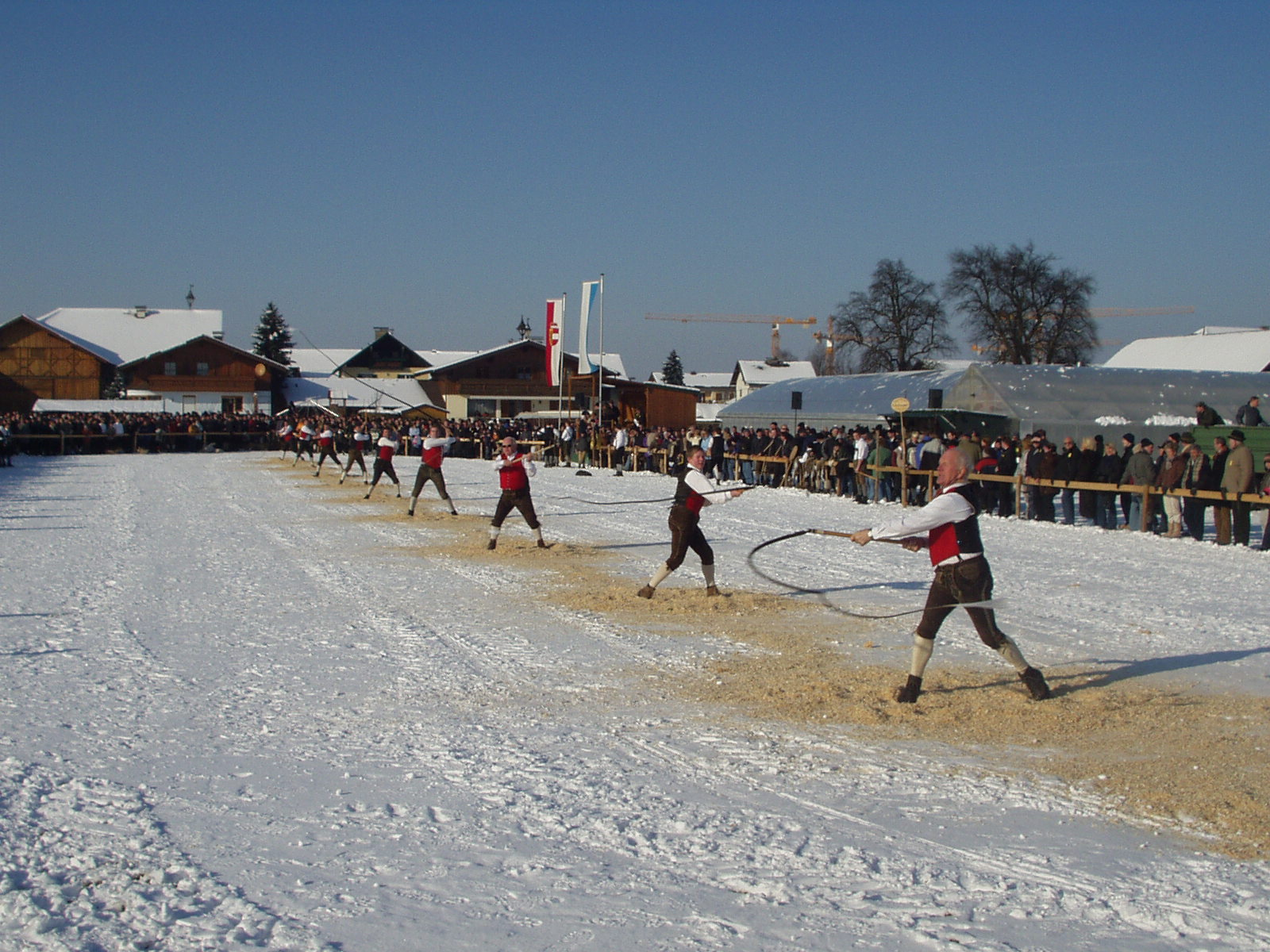
Aperschnalzen, in Salzburg, 2005

Aperschnalzen (Austro-Bavarian Apaschnoizn) is an old tradition of competitive whipcracking revived in the first half of the 20th century in Bavaria and Salzburg. The word "aper" means "area free of snow" in the Bavarian language.

The Aperschnalzen involves the rhythmic snapping and cracking of a whip up to 4 m in length (called "Goassl" in Austro-Bavarian) and takes place at the end of January and early February. It is performed in small groups ("Passen" in Bavarian) of 7, 9 or 11 members each. It has been thought that this tradition had a pagan meaning of "driving the winter away" by whipcracking.

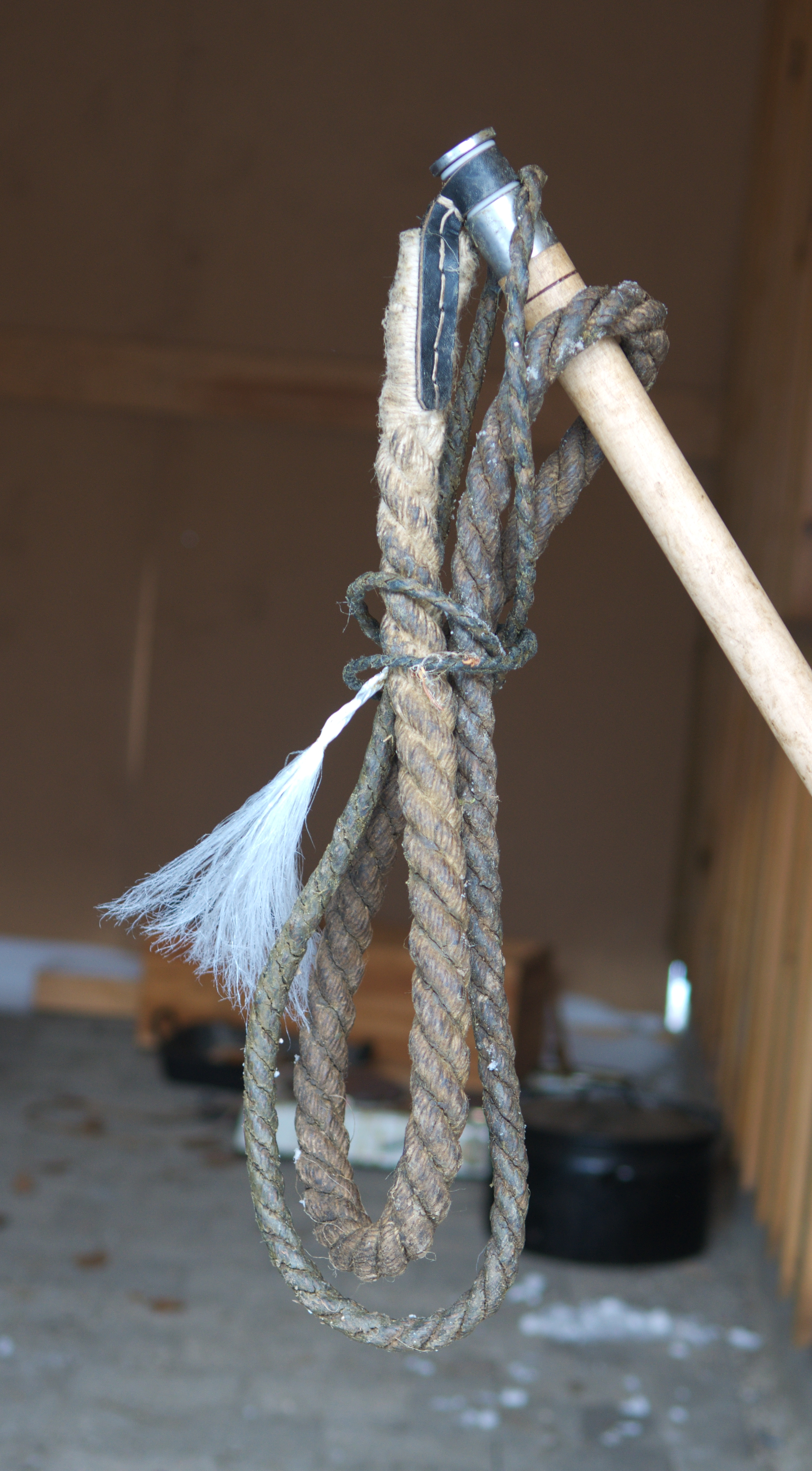
The whip

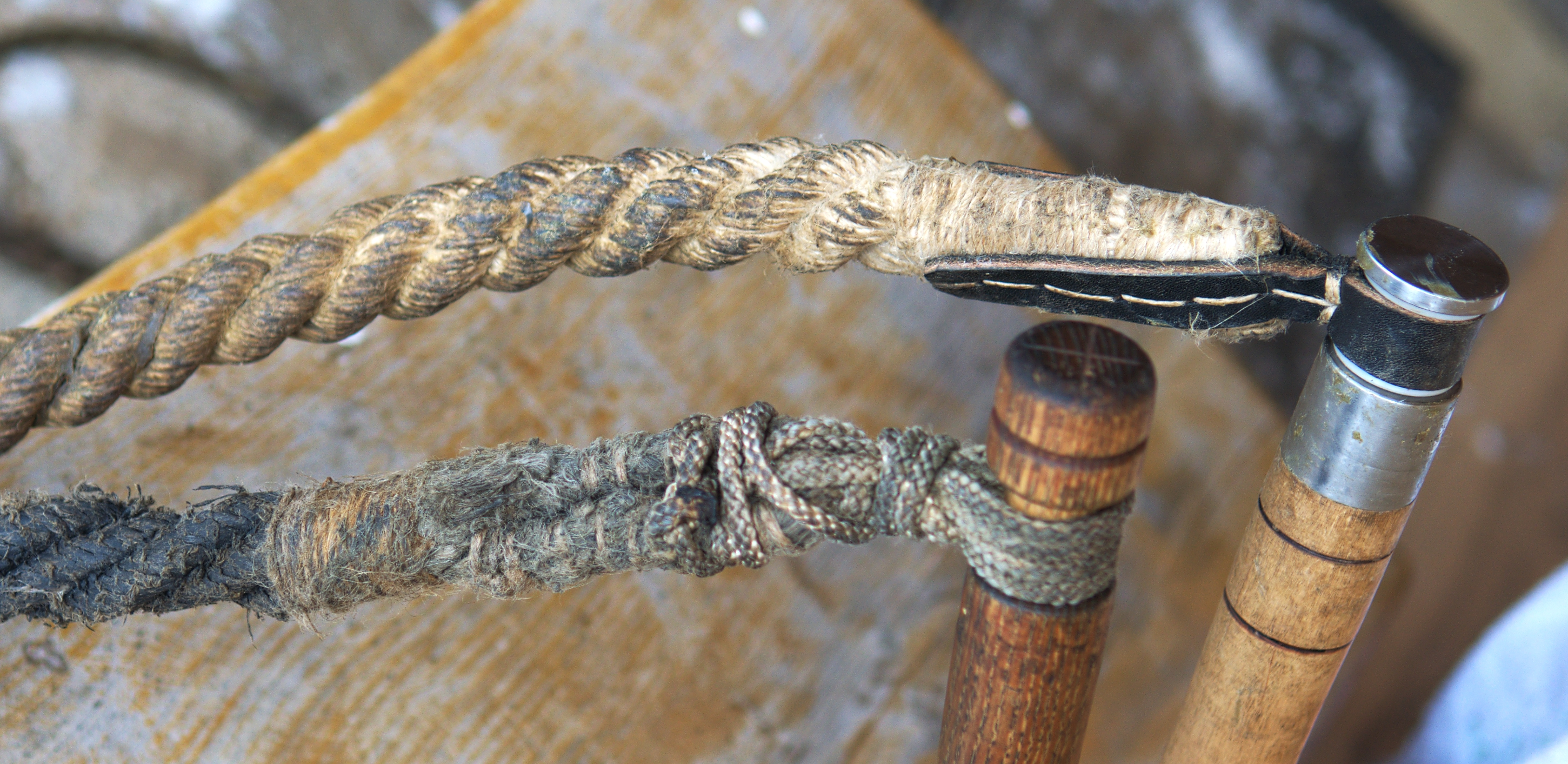
Different whip models

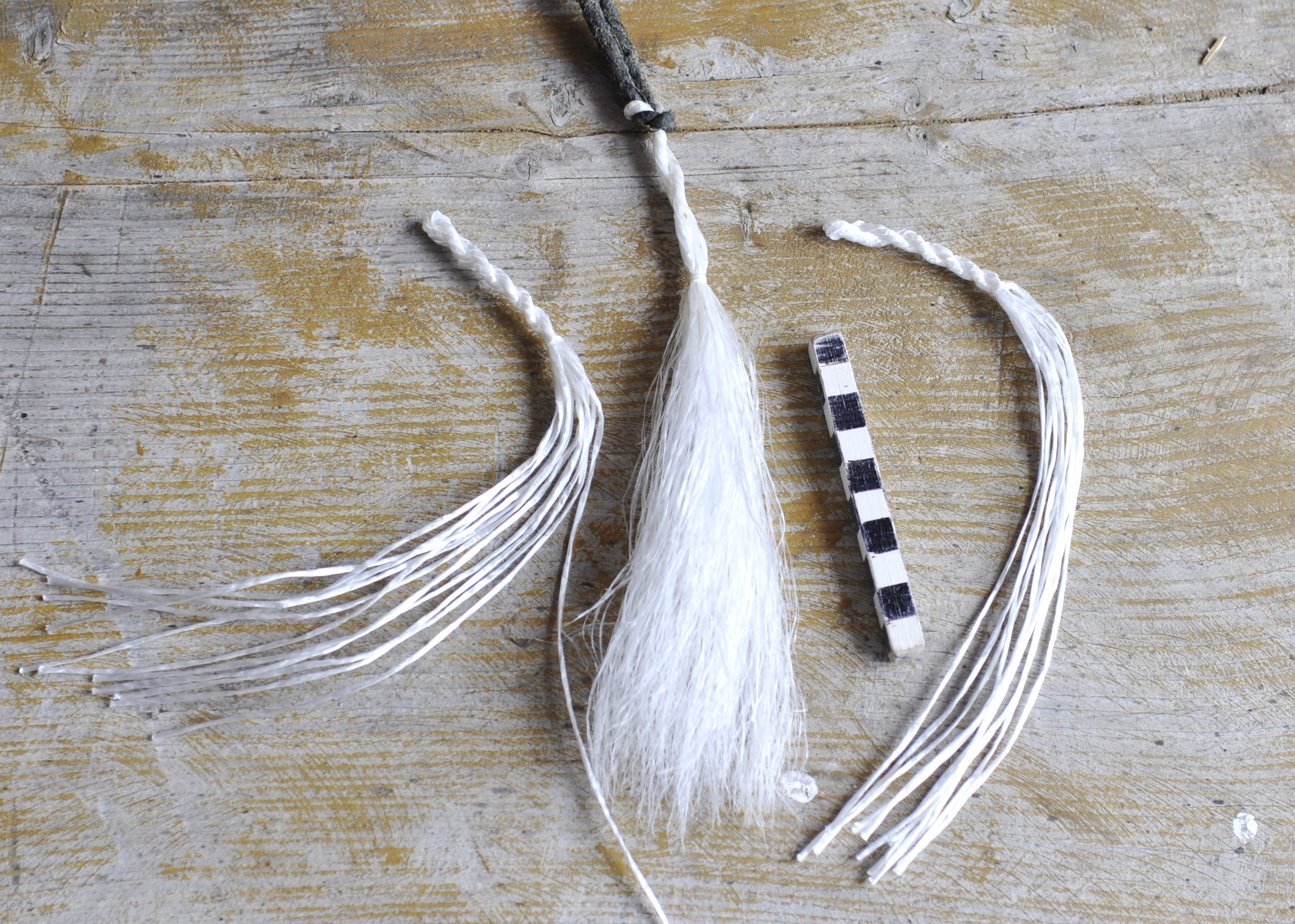
The cracker
