= Polocrosse =

Team sport combining polo and lacrosse

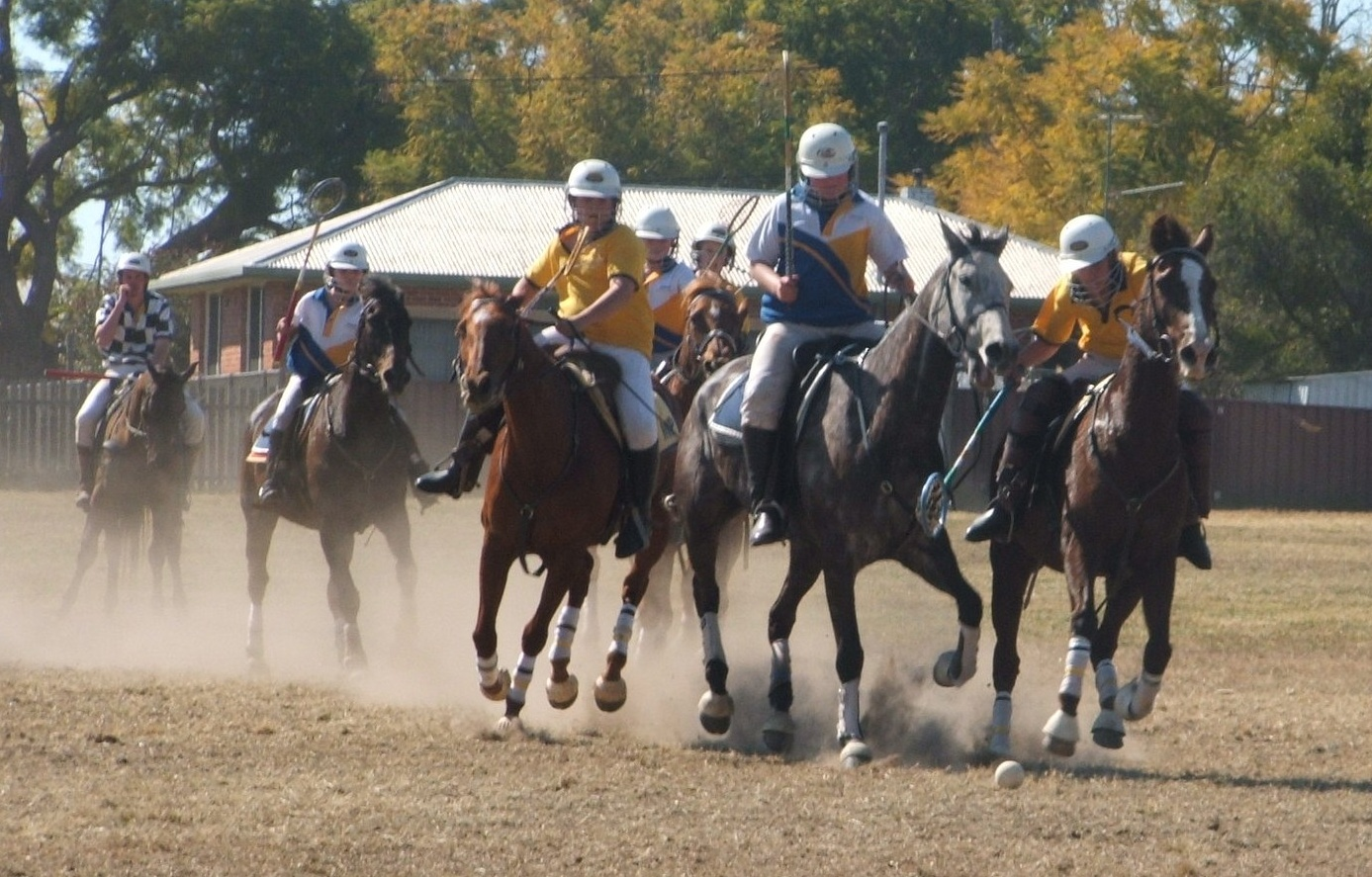
Playing polocrosse in New South Wales, Australia. No.1 Attack, Quirindi Club Final.

Polocrosse is a team sport derived from elements of polo and lacrosse. It is played outdoors on a field (called a pitch) while riding horseback. Each rider uses a cane or fiberglass stick to which is attached a racquet head with a loose, thread net, in which the ball is carried. The ball is made of sponge rubber and is about 100 mm (3.9 in) in diameter. The objective is to score by sending the ball between and above the opposing team's goal posts.

== International Polocrosse Council (IPC) ==
IPC was formed in Queensland, Australia on 21 June 1976.

=== Foundation countries ===
1. Australia
2. New Zealand
3. Papua New Guinea
4. Rhodesia (now Zimbabwe)
5. South Africa

=== Members ===
==== IPC Full Member Countries ====
1. Australia
2. Ireland
3. New Zealand
4. South Africa
5. United Kingdom
6. USA
7. Zambia
8. Zimbabwe

==== Affiliate Member Countries ====
1. Belgium
2. Canada
3. Germany
4. Netherlands
5. Norway
6. France
7. India
8. Italy

== Polocrosse World Cup ==
The Polocrosse World Cup occurs every four years by International Polocrosse Council. The first tournament was held in 2003 with Australia as the first world champions, and winning again in 2007. The next World Cup in 2011 was held in the United Kingdom with South Africa becoming the world champions and returned to home soil in 2015. The 2019 World Cup held in Australia was claimed by the Australian team.

1. 2003 Polocrosse World Cup
2. 2007 Polocrosse World Cup
3. 2011 Polocrosse World Cup
4. 2015 Polocrosse World Cup
5. 2019 Polocrosse World Cup
6. 2024 Polocrosse World Cup

== Rules ==
Unlike polo, players are allowed only to play one horse, except in the case of injury. There is no restriction on the horse's height, although polocrosse horses are generally smaller than 16hh. Horses of all breeds play polocrosse and the Australian Stock Horse is the most popular breed playing in Australia. Stallions are not permitted to play.

A team consists of six players, divided into two sections of three who each play either 2, 3 or 4 chukkas of six to eight minutes, depending on the rules of the tournament, with the two sections from each team alternating on and off the field each chukka. A match comprises four, six or eight chukkas. The three players in each section play the position of a No. 1, attack, a No. 2, midfield (a combination of defence and offence), or a No. 3, defence.

The team structure was designed to force players to pass the ball about amongst themselves, making it a better skilled, faster sport.

The field is 60 by 160 yards (55 m × 146 m), with three separate areas. The goal scoring areas, on each end, are 30 yards long. Only the No. 1 of the attacking team and the No. 3 of the defending team can play in these areas.

The middle area is 100 yards long. The line separating the goal scoring and centre areas is called the penalty or thirty-yard line. Goal posts are eight feet apart. To score, the ball must be thrown from outside an 11-yard semicircle in front of the goal.

Players can pick up the ball from the ground, catch it in their racquet, and ride with it. They throw it to other players until the No.1 has possession in the goal scoring area. A player cannot carry the ball over the penalty line, but must bounce it so that they do not have possession of it while actually crossing the line. It can also be passed to a player over the line.

When carrying the ball, a player must carry it on the stick side, i.e. right-handed players must carry it on the offside of the horse (if a person has possession of the ball and crosses the racket over the centre-line of the horse (the line that runs from the horses ears to the tail) it is a foul). A player can, however, pick-up or catch the ball on the non-stick side provided they immediately bring it back to their stick side.

Each chukka begins with a line up at a central spot on the side boundary line in centre field. The players from each team line up in single file, facing the umpire at the edge of the field, with the No. 1s in front, followed by the 2's and then the 3's. The umpire then throws the ball between the players, between shoulder and racket height so that all players have a chance to catch the ball. The teams always line up on the defensive side of one another.

The game recommences similarly after a goal has been scored, with the line up taking place on the alternate side of the field for every goal that is scored. Whenever an attempt at goal fails (i.e. a missed shot at goal), the No. 3 is awarded a 10-yard throw from the 30-yard line.

The most common award given in the case of a penalty is a 10-yard throw. Where the foul occurred determines the position on the field at which the throw is taken. Depending on the nature of the penalty, the 10-yard throw may be taken at the spot where the penalty occurred or it may be moved down the field to the next 30-yard line to advantage the fouled team. For example, if the team carrying the ball is fouled, the penalty will most likely be moved down the field to give advantage to the fouled team, however if the team carrying the ball commits the foul the ball may just be turned over to the other team at the point where the foul occurred.

Not all fouls are punished with a ten-yard throw. Particularly dangerous fouls (such as hitting another player in the head or helmet with the racket) result in a free goals being awarded. If a player continues to commit fouls after being cautioned by the umpire, commits a particularly dangerous or intentional foul, or generally behaves dangerously, the umpire can dismiss the player from the field.

If both teams are responsible for a penalty, or if the ball goes out of bounds after being deflected off a horse, the game is restarted with a line up. If the penalty occurs when the ball is in the end zone, the umpire will call a line up from within the area, between the attacking 1 and defending 3 players. If the penalty occurs when the ball is in centre field the game is restarted with a line up at the nearest sideline.

It is also illegal to ride through the goal posts, if any player's horse steps all 4 legs through the posts, it is an automatic free goal to the opposing team.

Players can get the ball from the opposition by hitting at an opponent's stick in an upwards direction only, with the swing starting from below the horses quarters when swing is forward, or below the horses withers when the swing is backward. This is done either to dislodge the ball or to prevent the opposition from gaining possession of it. This is called "giving wood". Riding off is also allowed, but crossing, stopping, or turning on the ball, or elbowing all constitute fouls. Sandwiching one player between two others also constitutes a foul.

== History ==
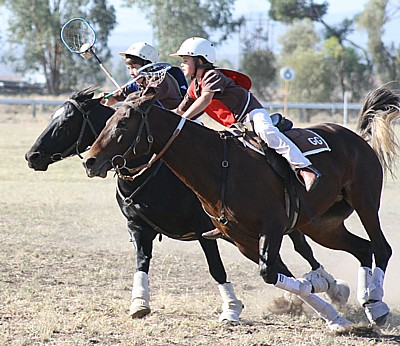
Juniors playing polocrosse in New South Wales, Australia

The modern game was developed in Australia before the Second World War. In 1938 Mr. and Mrs. Edward Hirst of Sydney read an article in an English horse magazine on polocrosse. As both were keen on horse breeding and horse sports they decided to find out more about it when they got to England. On arrival, they visited the National School of Equitation at Kingston Vale near London, where two instructors had developed an exercise to supplement the work at the riding school and help young riders take better charge of their horses.

The exercise was played indoors with two riders a side and markers on the wall from which the ball bounced back into play. The goals were elongated basketball nets hung at each end of the arena. The sticks were old polo sticks that had the polo mallet removed and replaced with a squash racquet head. This had a shallow string net, which they used to scoop up the ball. The idea was to scoop up the ball, which was a little larger than a tennis ball, ride with it to the end of the arena and drop it into the net to score.

Realising the possibilities of this exercise as an outdoor horse sport, the couple returned to Australia with sticks, balls and rule books and sought the assistance of Alf Pitty, a well-known horseman and polo player.

After many hours of discussion, practising, much trial and error and revision of the rules, they finally came up with a new game using only one horse and able to be played by a person of any age. They called the new game polocrosse.

After all their careful designing, Pitty then helped to give the first recorded polocrosse demonstration at Ingleburn Sports Ground near Sydney in 1939. Interest and enthusiasm was so great that it was not long before all the club members were practising this new game. A short time later in 1939 a meeting was called at Ingleburn to form the first polocrosse club. At this meeting the first book of the rules of the game was established. Burradoo was the next polocrosse club to be established in Australia and is now the longest running club in Australia.

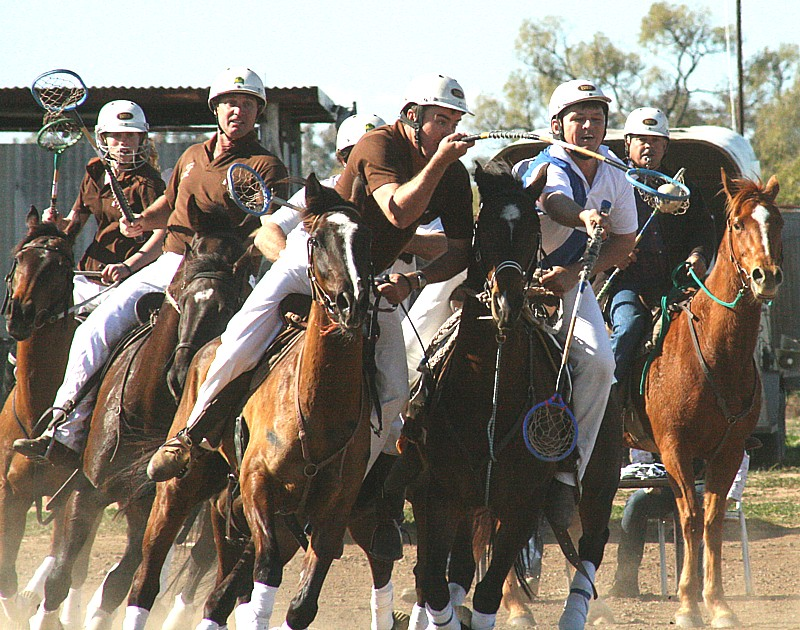
Polocrosse in New South Wales, Australia

In 1962 Walcha became the first club team to win the Lennon trophy at the Australian Red Cross championships at Maitland, when the four Goodwin brothers, Paul, Maurice, Noel and Brian together with Bob Gill and John Nixon played as the North New England No 1 team.

Polocrosse in South Africa started in the early 1950s. The first international tour of South Africa was in 1968 by Rhodesia and followed by the Australians in 1971. Polocrosse finally made it back to the United Kingdom in 1978, when it was introduced to two branches of the Pony Club in Surrey. It continued to be played at Pony Club level, with its popularity slowly growing. The arrival of polocrosse players from Zimbabwe (formerly Rhodesia) and South Africa in the UK in the early 1980s led to the establishment of polocrosse clubs outside of the Pony Club, and in 1985 the UK Polocrosse Association was formed. Polocrosse became an official Pony Club activity with its own championship at around the same time. Polocrosse is also played in Finland, France, Germany, New Zealand, the United States, Canada, Norway, the Netherlands, Papua New Guinea, Indonesia, Uruguay, Vanuatu, Zimbabwe, United Kingdom, Zambia, Italy and South Africa.

== Polocrosse in Ireland ==
In 1990 polocrosse came to Ireland. Brothers David and Ivor Young introduced polocrosse to Ireland in 1990 as an additional tourism attraction to their residential equestrian holiday business in County Wexford. David had just read an article on Polocrosse in a UK equestrian magazine. Interested to learn more about this game, the two brothers had an Australian coach, Bernie Uechtritz, at Horetown House some five weeks later. In the early stages, the game was only played at Horetown House, County Wexford, but it was not long before Brian McMahon of Rathcannon in County Limerick heard about this new game, and Limerick Polocrosse Club was the next club to be established. From here polocrosse expanded rapidly in Ireland, with several other clubs springing up, including Tipperary (based in Clonmel, County Tipperary), Carrickmines (based in South Dublin), Waterford (based in Tramore, County Waterford), Birr (Based in Birr, County Offaly), Cork (based in Middleton, County Cork) and three new recent additions: Silverspurs (based in South County Dublin), Tyrella (based in Tyrella, County Down) and Equus (based in South Dublin).
