= Fiona Smith (whipcracker) =

Fiona Smith (née Wilks, born circa 1973) is an Australian whip maker and competitive whipcracker. She is best known as the 12-time Australian ladies whipcracking champion, but has also won more than thirty other titles in local and national competition. Internationally, she won all three disciplines in an open (mixed gender) competition organised by the Wild West Arts Club and held in Las Vegas, Nevada. She did so each time she entered (in 1998, 1999 and 2002).

== Biography ==
Fiona Smith took up whipcracking – a competitive sport in Australia – at the age of ten and entered her first competition two years later. She won the Junior New South Wales Amateur Whipcracking Championships in 1988.

Smith subsequently gave up the sport for about five years before becoming interested again when she took a job in 1990 in a training stable, which involved the use of whips around horses. After honing her skills performing at public exhibitions, she entered the Sydney Royal Australian Championships in February 1995 and won the 1995 Ladies Australian Whipcracking Championship.

As of April 2011, Smith is the 12-time national ladies champion in competitive whipcracking, winning the title of the Australian Whipcrackers and Plaiters Association from 1995 to 1998, in 2000, and again each year from 2005 through 2011. Winning the competition for the tenth time in 2009, she introduced a number of new tricks which have since been adopted in international competitions by rival whipcrackers. In doing so, she established a new personal best, scoring 22 out of 20. Reporting on her 'scintillating' win in 2011, when the competition was held at Olympic Park, Sydney, the St George and Sutherland Shire Leader noted that Smith scored 24 out of 20 for one routine and was recognised on the train home.

Smith lives in Wingham, New South Wales, where she makes whips and leathergoods, primarily for export. She performs professionally in exhibitions with her father, Jim Wilks, as a team called "The Whiparoos," and has travelled internationally to do so.
