= Australian Stock Horse =

Breed of horse

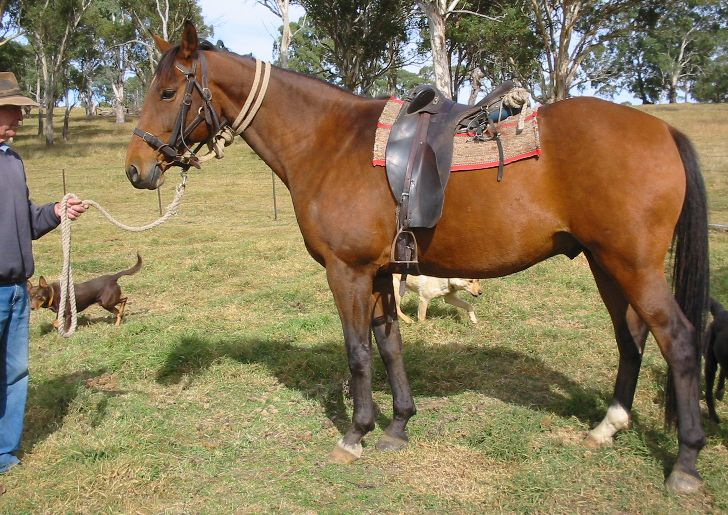

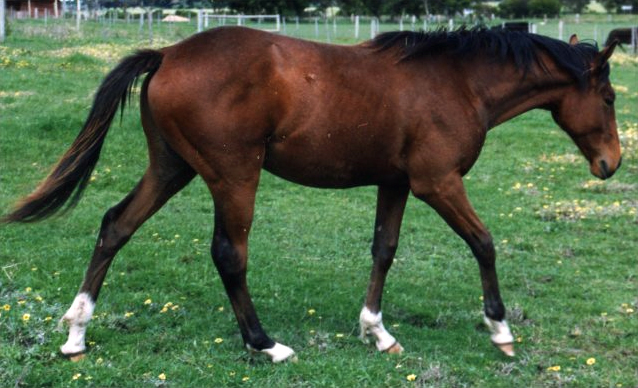
- Country of origin: Australia

Breed standards
- Australian Stock Horse Society

The Australian Stock Horse (or Stockhorse), has been especially bred for Australian conditions. It is a hardy breed of horse noted for endurance, agility, and good temperament. Its ancestry dates to the arrival of the first horses in Australia, brought from Europe, Africa, and Asia. It is used today in a wide variety of disciplines, and is still valued as a working horse by stockmen and stockwomen throughout Australia.

== History ==
The roots of the Australian Stock Horse date back to the earliest importation of nine horses to Australia, with the arrival of the First Fleet in Botany Bay in January, 1788. Some of the original horse breeds in these early imports included the Thoroughbred, Cape of Good Hope Horse (largely descended from the Barb and Spanish horse), Arabian, Timor Pony, and Welsh Mountain pony.

Horses in Australia were bred for their stamina and strength, with weaker animals culled and only the strongest allowed to breed. In the 1830s, additional Thoroughbreds were imported into Australia to improve the local strains, and the mid-20th century had infusions from the American Quarter Horse.

The Australian Stock Horse and the Waler horse come from similar roots, though today they are separate breeds. The "station horse" that was an ancestor of both breeds was used by the Australian Army in the First World War and was renowned for its toughness and endurance.

However, the modern Australian Stock Horse differs from the Waler Horse in that it is not as big. The horses shipped abroad to fight in war and kept at home to be bred on as Walers were the larger animals, as they were required to carry a rider with the considerable extra weight of weapons and a full pack. Some of the heaviest animals were also required pull water carts and carriages. However, the characteristics of toughness and endurance remain with the Australian Stock Horse of today.

Formal recognition of Australian Stock Horses as a distinct breed began in June 1971, when over 100 campdrafters and horse breeders met in Tamworth, New South Wales, to form the Australian Stock Horse Society. Many of these people bred stock horses using bloodlines tracing back to native stock, along with some Arabians, Thoroughbreds, and a few ponies of outstanding merit. Most of the early ASH registrations were of horses bred with bloodlines that excelled at both campdrafting and cattle work in the rugged Great Dividing Range.

Initially, horses were inspected for registration by three classifiers, who assessed them for conformation, breeding, and athletic ability. The best were accepted for inclusion in the Stud Book, some were approved for the registry appendix, and those not meeting the criteria for registration were rejected.

Fourteen specific foundation sires are responsible for most of the bloodlines accepted into the Society Australia-wide, and most well-bred Australian Stock Horses trace to one of these foundation sires. These included horses bred from colonial stock: Saladin, Cecil and his son Radium, Medlow, and Bobbie Bruce. The others were Thoroughbreds; Rivoli, Commandant, Panzer, Midstream, Young Valais, Gibbergunyah, Bushfire, Silvius, and Deo Juvante also exerted considerable influence. Since then Rivoli Ray, Abbey, Blue Moon Mystic, Eliotts Creek Cadet, Warrenbri Romeo, and some American Quarter Horses have also had a large influence on the breed.

The use of Quarter Horse bloodlines is somewhat controversial, with some breeders preferring to stay with older lines. Those who wish to bring in outside blood are required to pay very high fees to the society, thus providing an incentive for breeders to only bring in worthwhile horses.

== Characteristics ==
The Australian Stock Horse is bred for intelligence, courage, toughness, and stamina. The horse will be sound, agile and quick moving with a sure-footed walk. It will have a calm, responsive temperament. All colours are acceptable. Height ranges from 14 to 16.2 hands (56 to 66 inches, 142 to 168 cm).

The ideal Australian Stock Horse is well proportioned in all respects according to its size. Desired traits include a finely cut, expressive head with large eyes and a broad forehead. The neck is long and arched, with the head well set on. The withers should be well defined. Overall conformation is well-muscled, but not bulky, with correct conformation that includes a deep chest, well-sprung ribs, a strong and broad back, and powerful hindquarters. The hooves are hard and well-conformed.

== Breed today ==
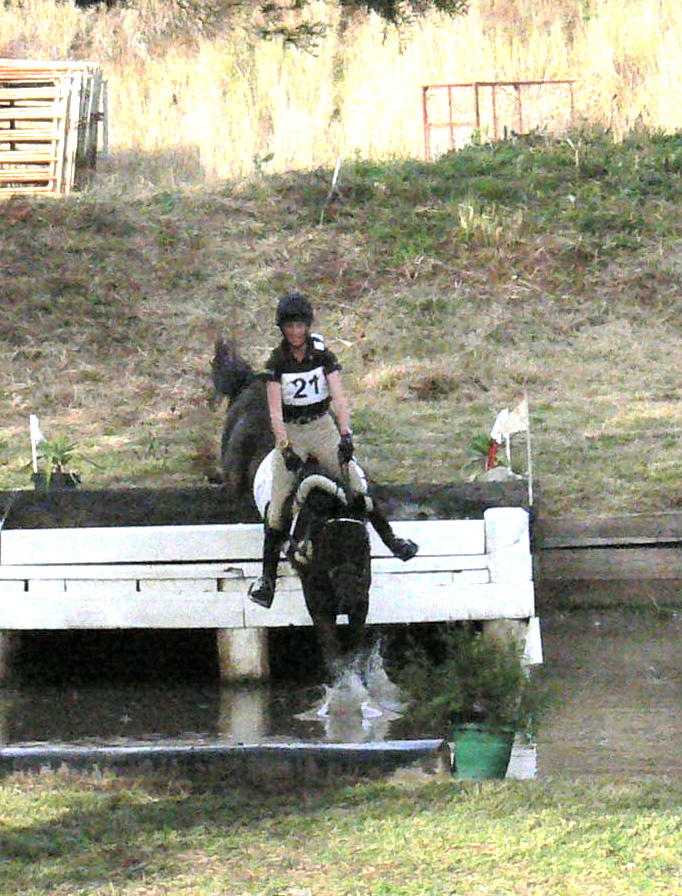
An Australian Stock Horse competing in eventing

Around 190,000 Australian Stock Horses are registered or foals recorded with the Australian Stock Horse Society. The Stock Horse is used in many competitive disciplines, including polo, polocrosse, dressage, campdrafting, show jumping, eventing, and endurance riding. It is also used for stockman challenges, Pony Club activities, general hacking, and stock work on cattle stations.

While horses are now often being replaced in the flatter Outback and Top End by motorcycles and helicopters, they are still necessary today for mustering (roundups) in rugged mountain terrain.

== Public performances ==
A tribute to the Australian Stock Horse was held during the 2000 Summer Olympics opening ceremony when an Australian Stock Horse reared and then another 120 Stock Horses were ridden into the stadium and performed intricate manoeuvres to the music of the specially written Olympics version of the main theme of the film The Man from Snowy River by Australian composer Bruce Rowland.

As of March 2008, the Australian Outback Spectacular used 42 Australian Stock Horses in its show on the Gold Coast, Queensland, 31 of which were used in a show on a rotational basis.

== See also ==
- Campdrafting
- The Man from Snowy River
- Stock horse
- Stockman (Australia)
