= Muster (livestock) =

Animal husbandry practice

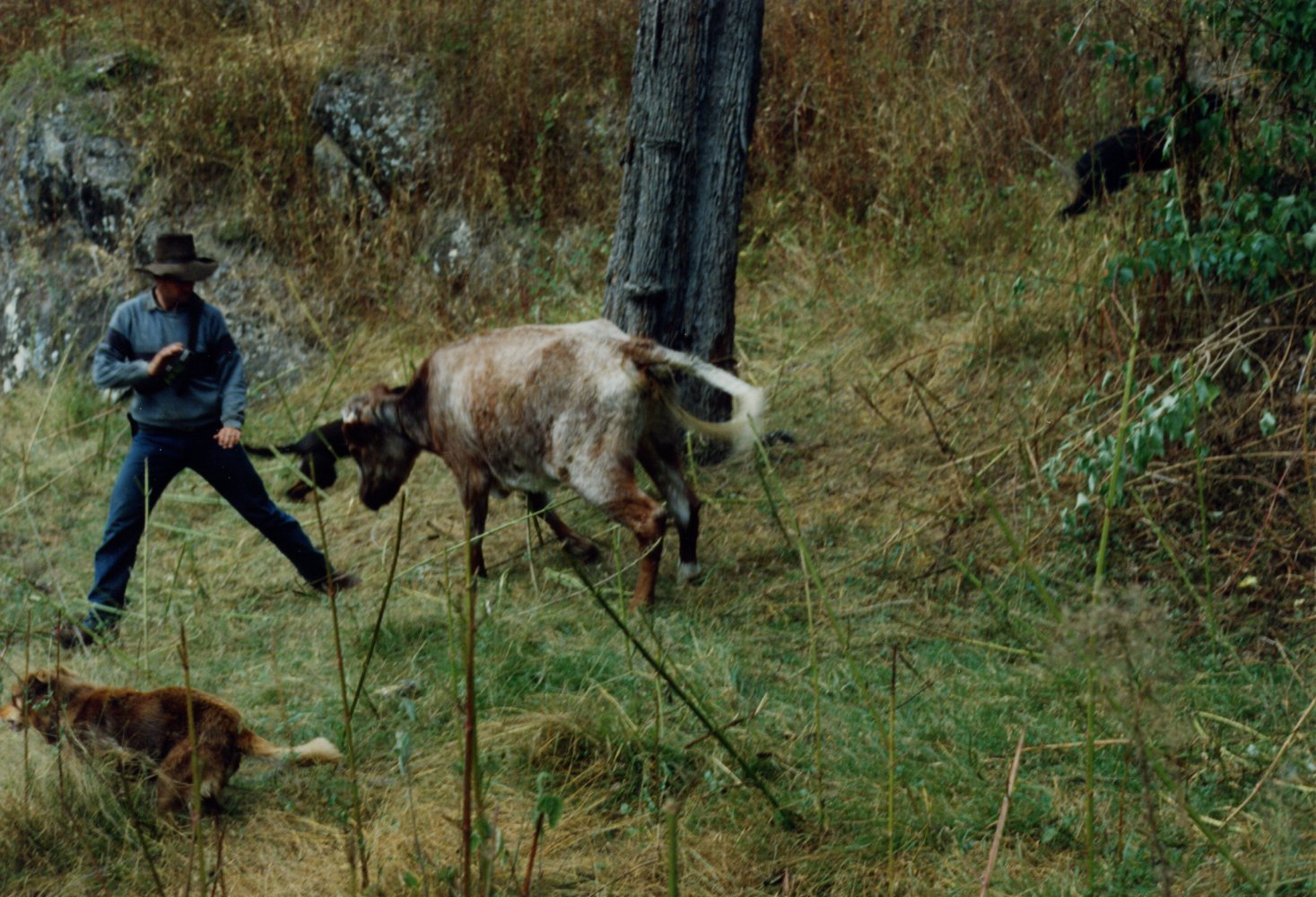
A feral bull being mustered in the Northern Tablelands, New South Wales.

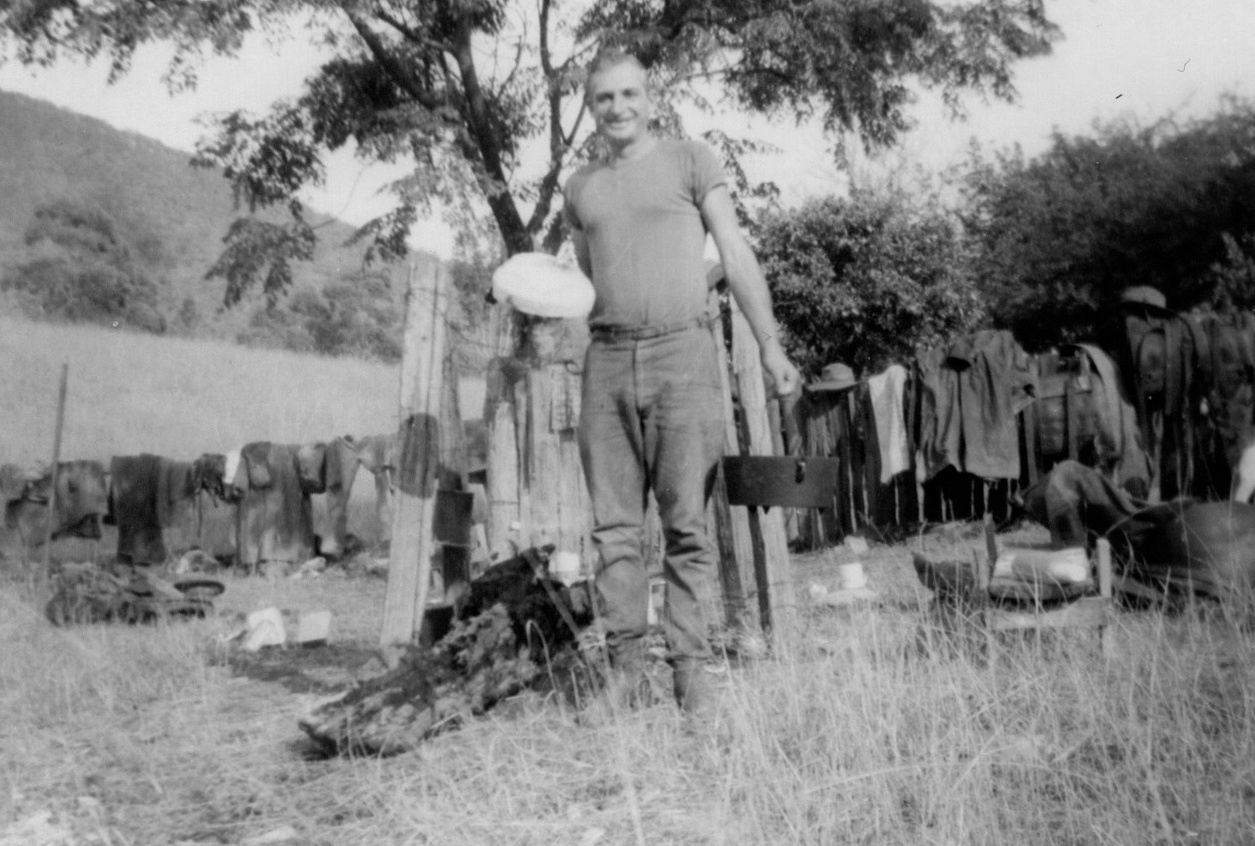
A mustering camp with a freshly baked damper. The pack saddles and oilskin coats are drying on the fence.

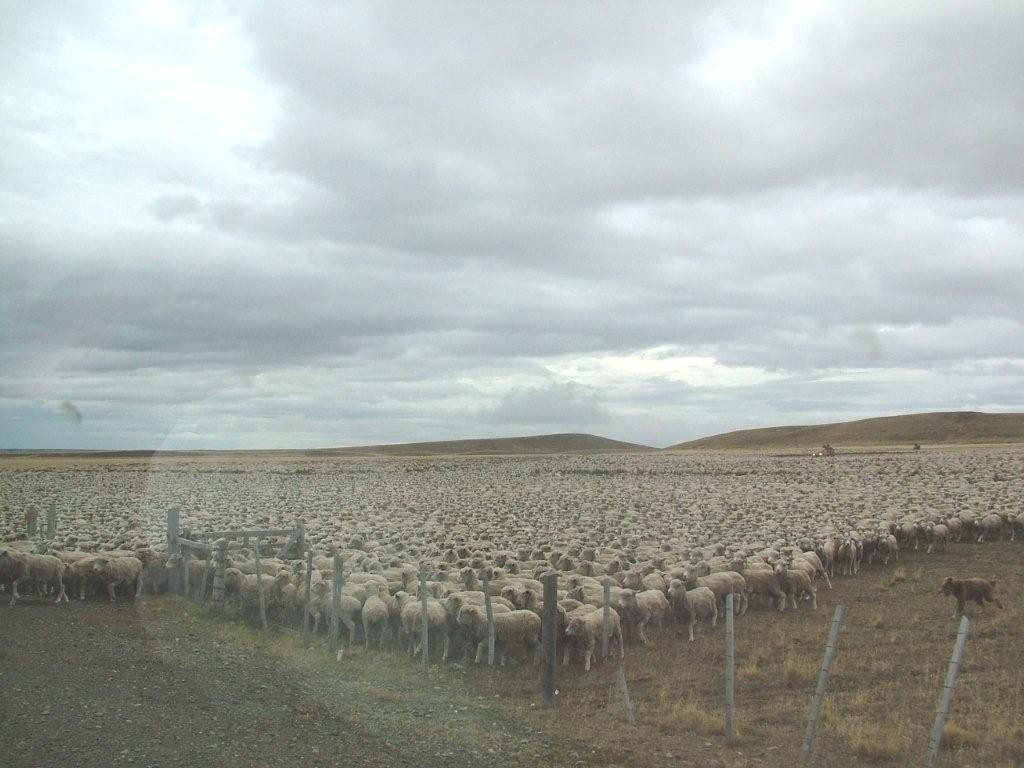
Mustering Corriedales in Patagonia

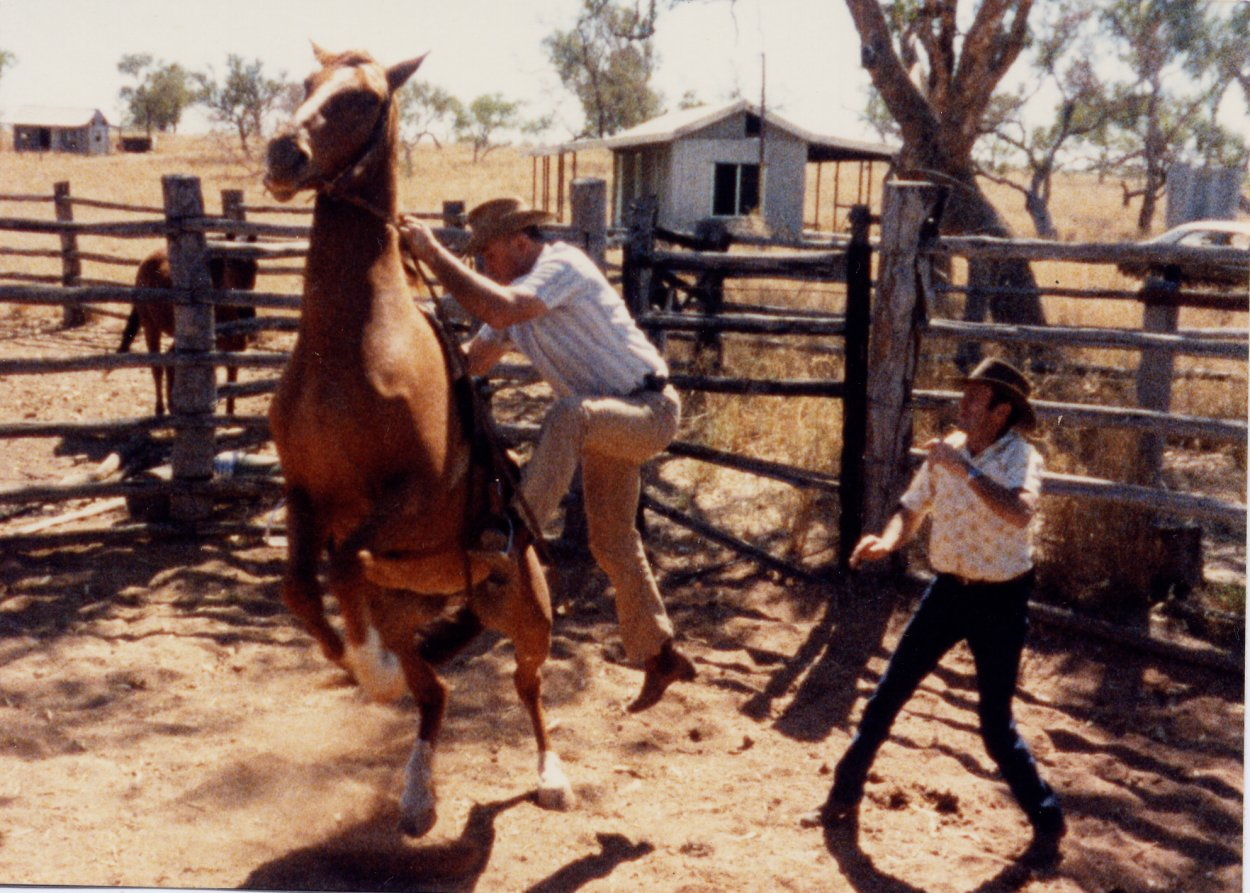
Horses in the outback are not noted for their docility and this adds to the dangers of mustering.

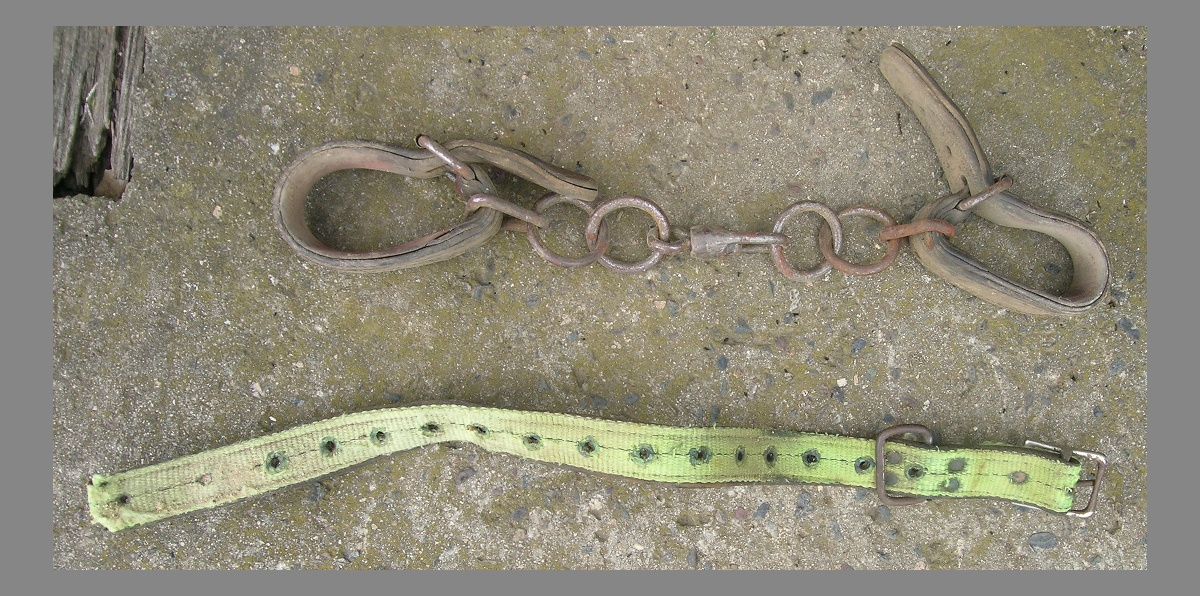
Grazing hobbles for horses and cattle hobbles (bottom)

A muster (Australia/New Zealand) or a roundup (United States/Canada) is the process of gathering livestock. Musters usually involve cattle, sheep or horses, but may also include goats, camels, buffalo or other animals. Mustering may be conducted for a variety of reasons including routine livestock health checks and treatments, branding, shearing, lamb marking, sale, feeding and transport or droving to another location. Mustering is a long, difficult and sometimes dangerous job, especially on the vast Australian cattle stations of the Top End, 'The Falls' (gorge) country of the Great Dividing Range and the ranches of the western United States. The group of animals gathered in a muster is referred to as a "mob" in Australia and a "herd" in North America.

== Methods ==
Mustering may be done on foot, with various vehicles, horses or with aircraft. Techniques in mustering cattle or sheep will depend on region, culture, distances and the type of terrain involved, and the type of animal that is being mustered. Most sheep mustering nowadays tends to be done with utes, motorcycles or all-terrain vehicles (ATVs, commonly called "quads" (quad-bikes) in Australia or a "four-wheeler" in the US), whereas cattle mustering lends itself more towards the use of horses. The most popular horse for this job would is a stock horse or a very hardy bush horse. The people who muster animals are usually referred to as stockmen in Australia and, depending on the animal gathered, as wranglers or cowboys in the US.

Dogs are typically used where it is possible or helpful to do so. The hardy Australian Kelpie or one of its crosses is the most popular breed of dog for mustering sheep and cattle in Australia. The Australian Cattle Dog or "blue heeler" is a popular ranch dog in the US, as is the Border Collie, Australian Shepherd, and related crossbreds. It may be difficult or impossible to use dogs in hot, dry or burry conditions. The use of some dogs on cows with young calves may be counterproductive as cows will chase dogs that work too close to them. Working dogs are essential in the rugged gorge country and also in scrubby locations where dogs are able to flush out cattle from low brush. The flight zone, too, is an important principle to remember when working or mustering livestock. When mustering cattle in isolated gorge country a good dog will silently move ahead of the stockman and block up the stock until the rider appears to take control. In Australia, a stockwhip is usually carried and used as needed when mustering cattle with horses. In North America, a lasso is used from horseback, both to rope and move particularly recalcitrant animals, but also as a simple goad. However, a different style of whip, also called a "stock whip," may be utilized by handlers on the ground.

If only part of the mustered mob of cattle is required then the selected animals may be open "campdrafted away" (AU) or "cut out" (US) from the mob while contained in a large fenced area and driven away. This practice normally requires several skilled riders, but saves time and is better than yard drafting.

The seasonal mustering of cattle with horses is still very important in remote country and the stockmen will spend long days riding and camping in isolated areas. When cattle have to be castrated or ear marked in country that is too remote from fenced-in areas ("yards"-AU, "corrals"-US), they have to be thrown. This is accomplished by various methods. In the US, roping the animal and tying up its legs once thrown is a common method. In Australia, the common method is getting the beast off balance either with the pressure of a horse or in open country with a vehicle. Lighter beasts may also be thrown by holding the tail to pull them off balance. When downed the beast may have its back legs hobbled if it is too big to hold otherwise. In South America, the animal is often tripped with a bola and then hobbled or tied once down.

Livestock can also be passively mustered by trap yards (AU) or holding corrals (US), which are set up at points where enticements such as water, molasses, fodder or salt are placed. This method can be an effective and efficient technique for mustering in timbered country or for capturing feral animals. A trap yard can be set up around a designated point and the animals can be trained to use the yard over a period of weeks before the gates are closed to outward movement. Sometimes quiet coaxers (coachers) are used to assist in the mustering and droving of wild or feral livestock.

One of the most difficult animals to muster are aged feral steers (US) or piker bullocks (AU), which were "micky bulls" (uncastrated young male cattle) that were caught, castrated and then later lost and grew up in the wild. These bullocks often tend to live alone and are usually stronger than cows and young cattle.

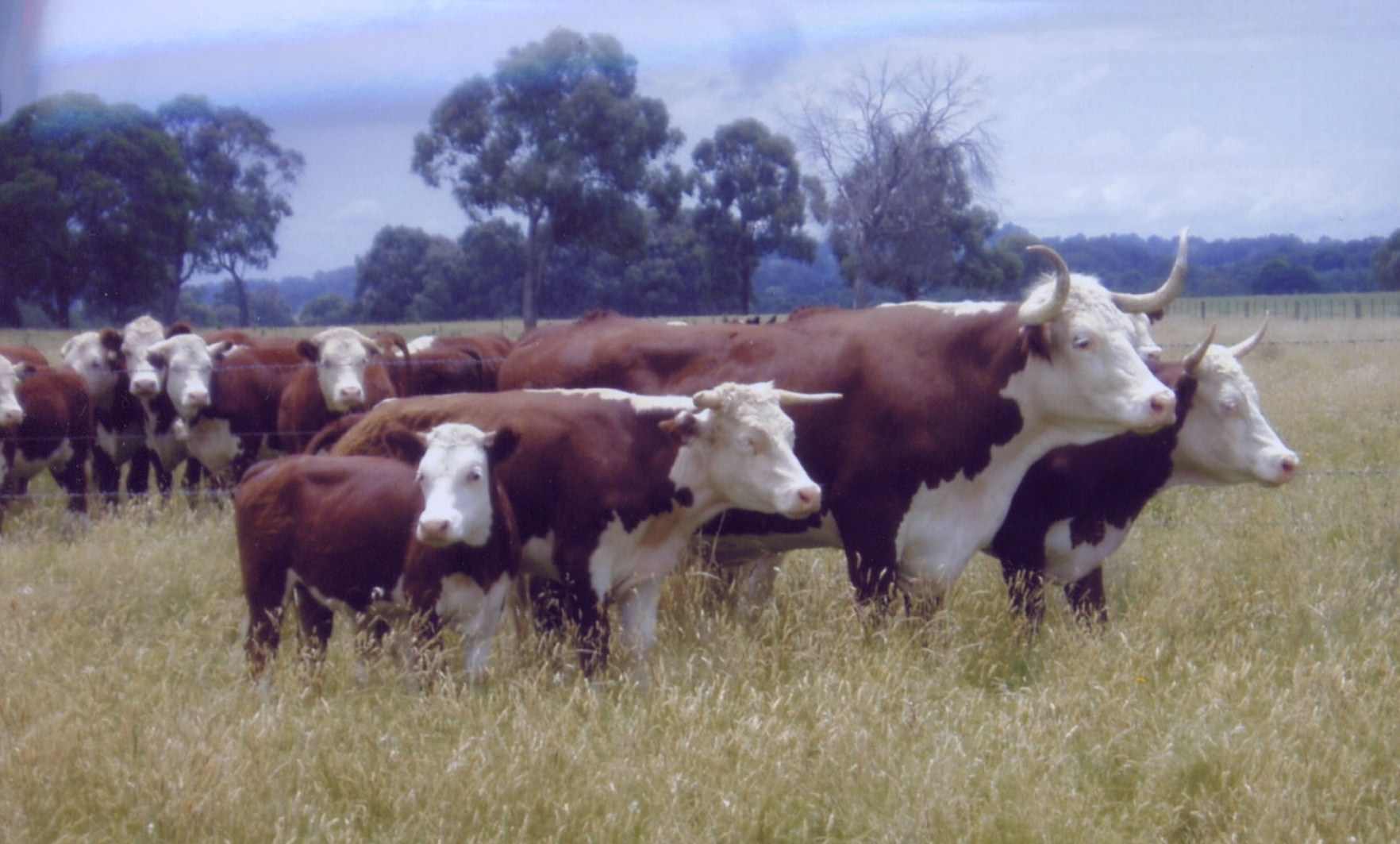
An old "piker" bullock

Helicopters are now a valuable tool in mustering large areas; they are used to locate the cattle and will then assist the mounted stockmen to yard the cattle. Helicopter mustering pilots require a cool head and lightning reflexes, as the chopper as they fly works in their own dust close to the swaying treetops. Working so close to the ground, wind is another major consideration for these pilots. These pilots also need the special skill of good 'stock sense' so as not push the cattle too hard or fast. Planes are mainly used for spotting stock and notifying the stockmen on the ground of their location via a CB radio.

Foot mustering is usually reserved for rounding up quiet or small mobs that are close to the designated destination. This method may also be used in the Southern Alps of New Zealand where it is considered too steep to safely use horses. In this case the stockman and his dogs would be lowered from a helicopter onto the higher slopes to bring the sheep down, possibly before winter. The New Zealand stockmen usually use Huntaway dogs for driving sheep away and the Border Collie is also popular for heading work.

Low stress stock handling schools are now regularly run to educate graziers, stockmen and some helicopter pilots in the working of cattle especially, and sheep as well. Drones are also being investigated, with promising results from early tests.

== Australian Top End ==
Aboriginal stockmen played a large part in the life of Top End cattle stations. These men and women were splendid stockmen and were an integral part of the musters. Mustering in the Top End is conducted during the dry season from April to September when additional stockmen will be employed for the purpose. Initially, mustering here involved having stock camps where about three to seven ringers under a head stockman or overseer rode out with the horses to the area to be mustered. The musterers started early each day by bringing up the hobbled horses, saddling up and then spending a long day mustering, branding, castrating and drafting the cattle. These long days were hard on man and beast with each having to contend with the heat, dust and flies. The men endured camping on the ground and had a monotonous diet of meals that were cooked on an open fire, usually by an unskilled cook.

Aggressive, rogue bulls or buffalo in the Top End are captured using specially converted 4WD ‘bull catcher’ vehicles to bring them down prior to their transportation. This work can be very dangerous and requires great skill and agility on the part of the stockmen involved. Sometimes professional bull catchers, who were paid per beast captured, were used for this work.

A "bang-tail muster" is conducted to accurately account for cattle on large properties by cutting the tail brush before their release. Thus those with long tails have not previously been counted.

A subtitle for the Sydney Royal Easter Show is The Great Australian Muster.

== Roundups in the Western US ==
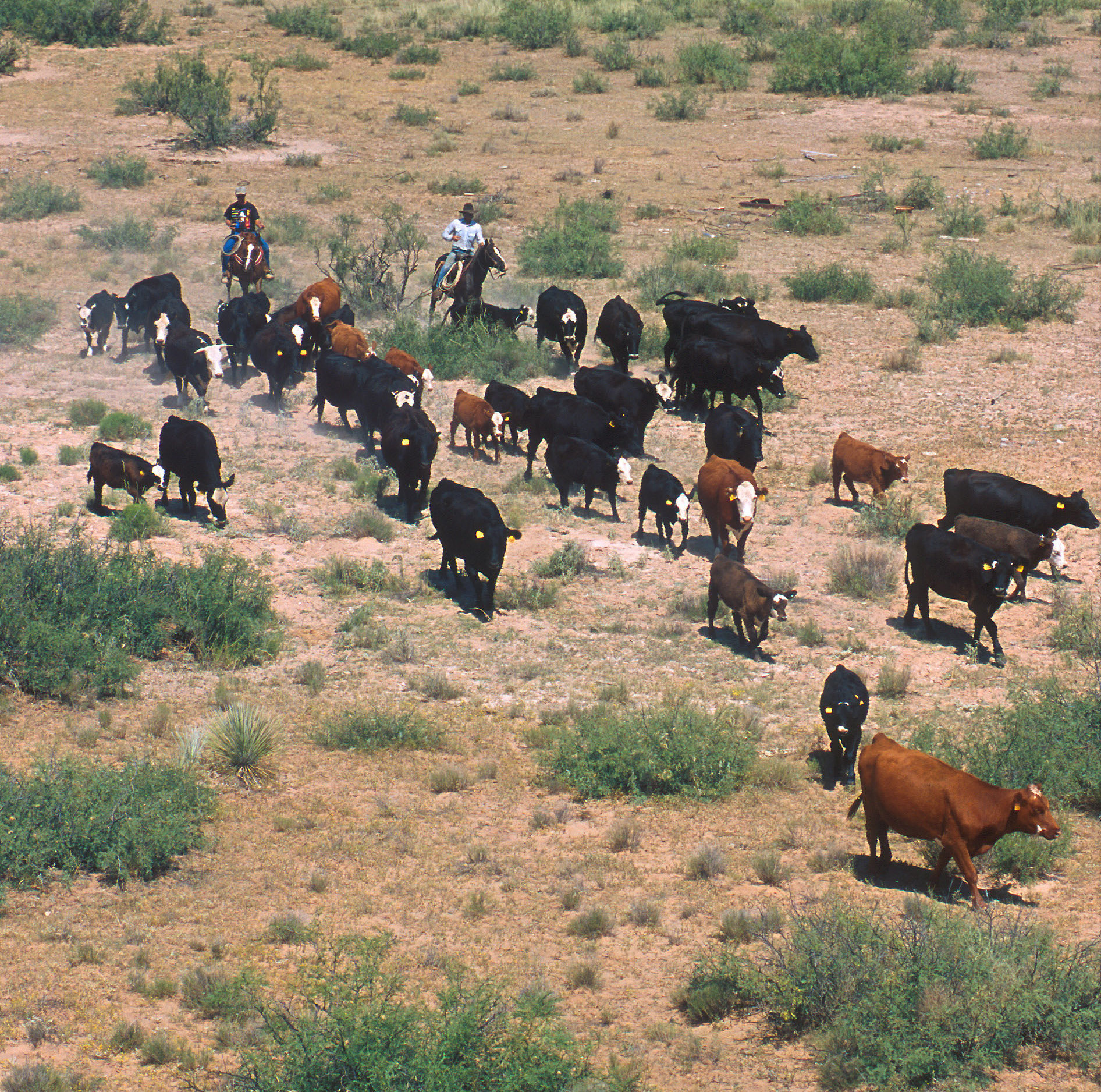
A modern, small-scale roundup in New Mexico, US. Cattle are being driven to a loading site.

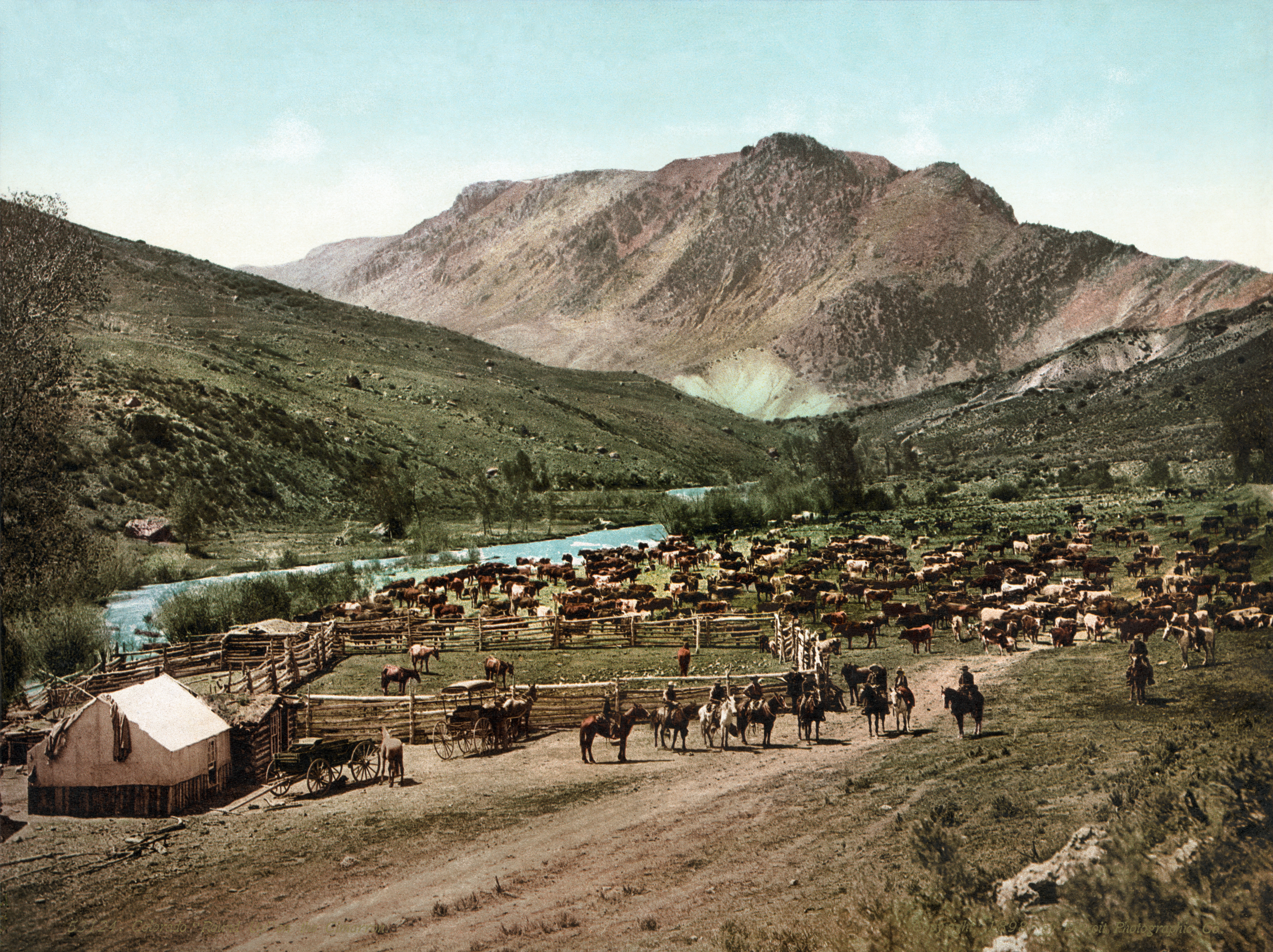
An 1898 photochrom of a roundup near Cimarron, Colorado, US

The North American roundup was an iconic image of the American Old West: the gathering of cattle in the open range, followed by them being driven vast distances from ranches to distant railheads over a period of several weeks. Due to the time and distance involved, not only did livestock and cowboys have to endure rough terrain and extreme weather, herds were also at risk from theft, hunger and disease. As railroads expanded, the time and distance travelled became shorter until railroads expanded into most communities, requiring cattle drives of a few days or a couple of weeks at most. Later, as motorised transport for livestock became common, rounded-up animals were often driven to the nearest road, herded into holding corrals, then loaded onto trucks for further transport. The modern American roundup now generally encompasses the gathering of animals from grazing lands in outlying sections of a large private ranch or from public lands leased from the Bureau of Land Management or US Forest Service. This process may still take many days and at times may require cowboys to camp out in remote areas, though most often this will be at a base camp near the holding corrals. The animals are gathered in holding corrals near a developed road, loaded into a livestock trailer or semi-trailer and transported to their ultimate destination.

The skills required to round up and drive cattle became formalized in the sports of rodeo, cutting, reining, team penning and related competitive events. The term "roundup" is used in the title of many rodeos, notably the longstanding Pendleton Round-Up, held annually in the state of Oregon.

== In popular culture ==
Circa 1957, Slim Dusty recorded the Wave Jackson composition "Once When I Was Mustering" as the B-side to "A Pub with No Beer".

== See also ==
- Australian Stock Horse
- Drover (Australian)
- Livestock transportation
- Flight zone
- Stockwhip
