= List of awards and nominations received by SpongeBob SquarePants =

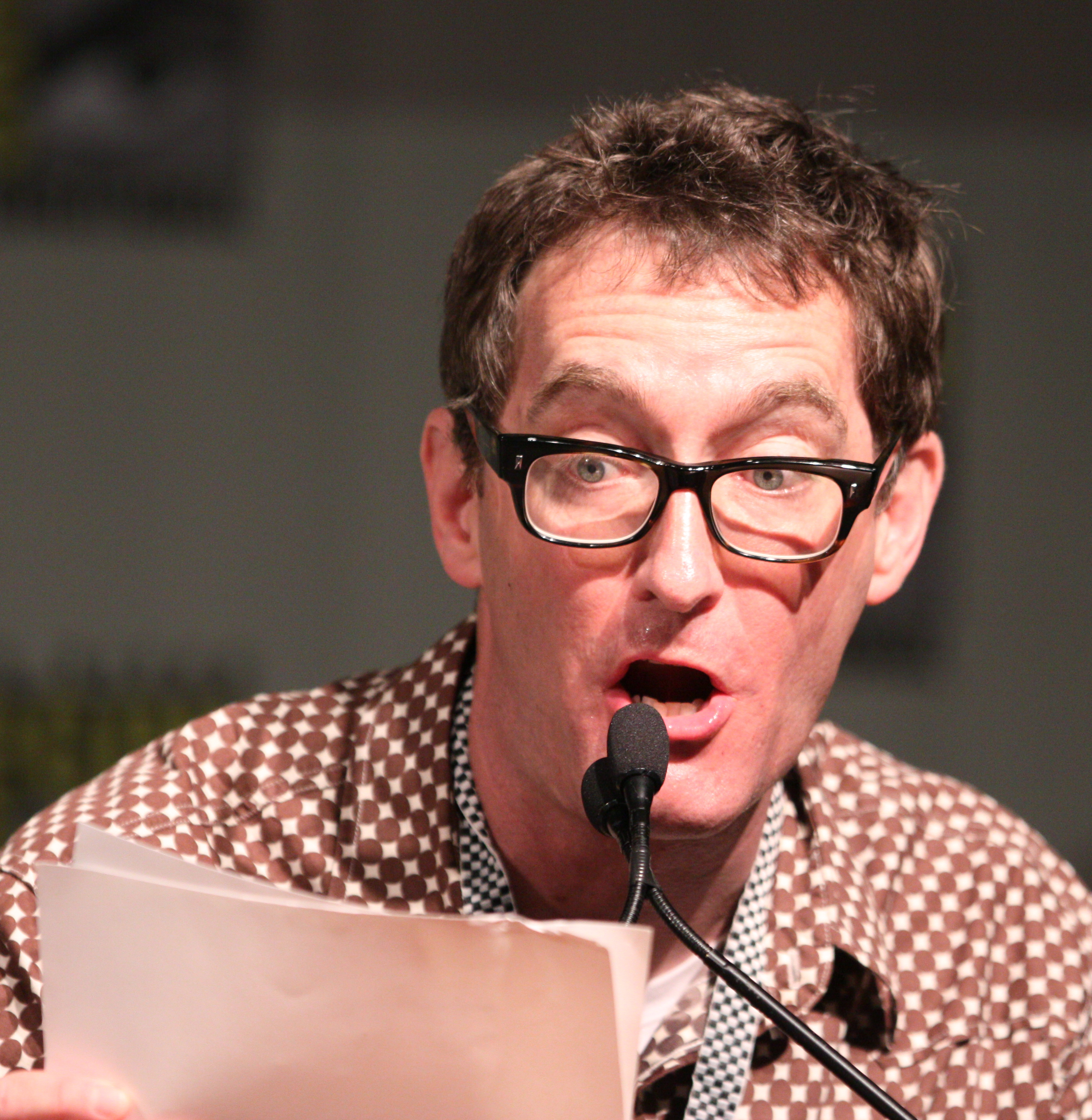
- Tom Kenny received a Daytime Emmy Award and 2 Annie Awards for his performance as the voice of SpongeBob SquarePants.
Awards and nominations
Award	Wins	Nominations
Nickelodeon Australian Kids' Choice	1	1
Nickelodeon Kids' Choice	15	17
Teen Choice	1	1
Emmy Awards	6	27
People's Choice Awards	0	1
Satellite Awards	0	2
Annecy International Animated Film Festival	1	2
Annie Award	6	21
Artios Awards	1	3
ASCAP Film and Television Music Awards	3	3
ASTRA Awards	0	1
BMI Film & TV Awards	1	1
British Academy Children's Awards	4	8
Commie Awards	0	1
Golden Reel Awards	8	17
Producers Guild of America Awards	0	3
Television Critics Association Awards	1	3
TP de Oro	3	3
ASCAP Film and Television Music Awards	1	1
Golden Trailer Awards	0	2
MTV Russia Movie Awards	0	1
Young Artist Awards	0	1
Outer Critics Circle Awards	4	11
Drama League Awards	0	1
Drama Desk Awards	6	12
Chita Rivera Awards for Dance and Choreography	0	3
Tony Awards	1	12
Theatre World Award	1	1

Totals (Note: Certain award groups do not simply award one winner. They acknowledge several different recipients, have runners-up, and have third place. Since this is a specific recognition and is different from losing an award, runner-up mentions are considered wins in this award tally. For simplification and to avoid errors, each award in this list has been presumed to have had a prior nomination.)
- Wins: 103
- Nominations: 209

SpongeBob SquarePants is an American animated television series that has aired on Nickelodeon since May 1, 1999. Created by marine biologist and animator Stephen Hillenburg, the show chronicles the adventures and endeavors of the title character and his various friends in the fictional underwater city of Bikini Bottom. Many of the ideas for the show originated in an unpublished, educational comic book titled The Intertidal Zone, which Hillenburg created in the mid-1980s. SpongeBob SquarePants features the voices of Tom Kenny, Clancy Brown, Rodger Bumpass, Bill Fagerbakke, Mr. Lawrence, Jill Talley, Carolyn Lawrence, Mary Jo Catlett and Lori Alan. It is executive produced by Hillenburg and formerly by Paul Tibbitt, who also functioned as its showrunner from the fourth season to the ninth.

Since its debut, SpongeBob SquarePants has earned widespread critical acclaim, and has been noted for its appeal towards different age groups. It has also received a variety of different award nominations, including 17 Annie Awards (with six wins), 17 Golden Reel Awards (with eight wins), 27 Emmy Awards (with six wins), 23 Kids' Choice Awards (with 22 wins), five BAFTA Children's Awards (with two wins), three Television Critics Association Awards (with one win), and two Producers Guild of America Awards.

Voice cast members Catlett, Kenny and Bumpass have each received nominations for their voice acting performances. Kenny is the most decorated actor in the cast. The SpongeBob SquarePants Movie, a feature-length film released in 2004, has received 11 awards nominations, with two wins coming from the American Society of Composers, Authors and Publishers and the Australian Kids' Choice Awards. The stand-alone sequel released in 2015 garnered an additional five nominations. The third film released in 2020 garnered an additional five nominations. The stage musical adaptation opened in Broadway in 2018 win 12 awards. In total, the SpongeBob SquarePants franchise won 218 prizes including 75 victories and trophies.

== Awards of SpongeBob SquarePants ==
=== Annie Awards ===
The Annie Awards are accolades annually presented by ASIFA-Hollywood recognizing excellence in the field of animation. First awarded in 1972, it deems itself as "animation's highest honor." SpongeBob SquarePants has received six wins.

List of Annie Awards and nominations received by SpongeBob SquarePants
Year	Category	Nominee(s)	Result	Ref(s).
2005	Best Animated Television Production		Won	
2006	Best Writing in an Animated Television Production	C.H. Greenblatt, Paul Tibbitt, Mike Bell, and Tim Hill for "Fear of a Krabby Patty"	Won	
2010	Best Voice Acting in a Television Production	Tom Kenny as SpongeBob SquarePants in "Truth or Square"	Won	
2011	Best Animated Television Production for Children		Won	
2011	Music in a Television Production	Jeremy Wakefield, Sage Guyton, Nick Carr, and Tuck Tucker	Won	
2013	Character Animation in an Animated Television or other Broadcast Venue Production	Dan Driscoll for "It's a SpongeBob Christmas!"	Won	

=== British Academy Children's Awards ===
Awarded since 1969, the British Academy Children's Awards are annual accolades bestowed by members of the British Academy of Film and Television Arts (BAFTA) recognizing excellence in children's media. SpongeBob SquarePants was nominated for nine awards with four wins.

List of British Academy Children's Awards and nominations received by SpongeBob SquarePants
Year	Category	Recipient(s)	Result	Ref(s).
2007	International	Stephen Hillenburg and Alan Smart	Won	
2012	International	Paul Tibbitt, Casey Alexander and Zeus Cervas	Won	
2017	International	Production team	Won	
2018	International Animation	Stephen Hillenburg, Vincent Waller, Marc Ceccarelli	Won	

=== Emmy Awards ===
Awarded since 1949, The Primetime Emmy Awards recognizes outstanding achievements in American prime time television programming. The accolade is annually bestowed by members of The Academy of Television Arts & Sciences. Awards presented for accomplishments in daytime television programming are designated "Daytime Emmy Awards." Since 2022, the Children's and Family Emmy Awards are accomplishments in recognition of excellence in American children's and family-oriented television programming. To date, the show has been nominated for 27 Emmy Awards, with six wins (one in 2010, one in 2014, two in 2018, one in 2020 and one in 2022).

==== Primetime Emmy Awards ====
Year	Category	Nominee(s)	Episode(s)	Result	Ref(s).
2003	Outstanding Animated Program (for Programming Less Than One Hour)	^{See below}	"New Student Starfish" and "Clams"	Nominated	
2004	Outstanding Animated Program (for Programming Less Than One Hour)	^{See below}	"Ugh"	Nominated	
2005	Outstanding Animated Program (for Programming Less Than One Hour)	^{See below}	"Fear of a Krabby Patty" and "Shell of a Man"	Nominated	
2007	Outstanding Animated Program (for Programming Less Than One Hour)	^{See below}	"Bummer Vacation" and "Wigstruck"	Nominated	
2008	Outstanding Animated Program (for Programming Less Than One Hour)	^{See below}	"The Inmates of Summer" and "The Two Faces of Squidward"	Nominated	
2009	Outstanding Special Class - Short-Format Animated Programs	^{See below}	"Dear Vikings"	Nominated	
2011	Outstanding Short-format Animated Program	^{See below}	"That Sinking Feeling"	Nominated	
2016	Outstanding Short Form Animated Program	^{See below}	"Company Picnic"	Nominated	
2019	Outstanding Short Form Animated Program	^{See below}	"Plankton Paranoia"	Nominated	

==== Daytime Emmy Awards ====
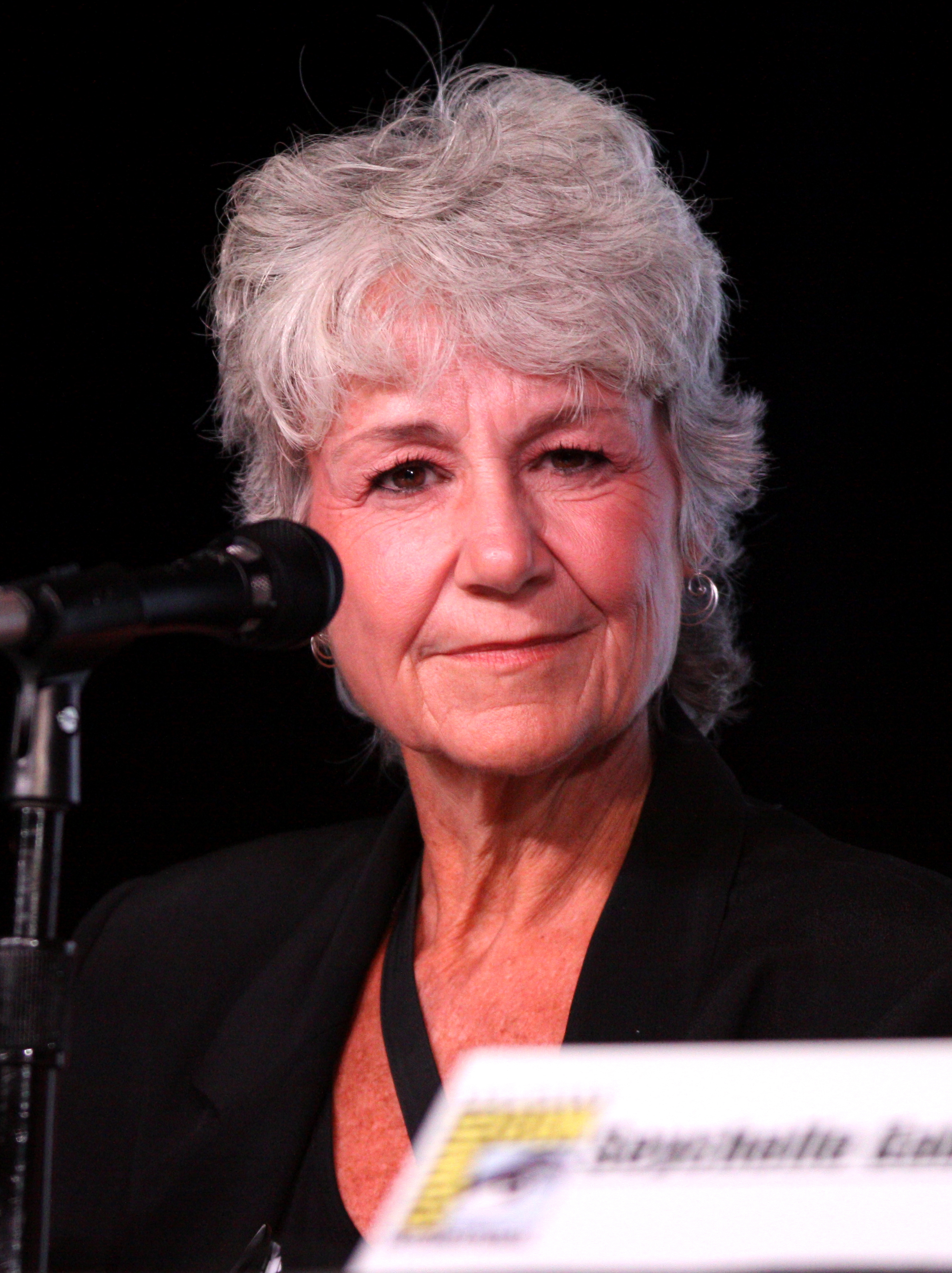
In 2010, Andrea Romano (pictured), alongside Andrew Overtoom, Alan Smart and Tom Yasumi, received a Daytime Emmy Award nomination for her directorial work on the show.

List of Daytime Emmy Awards and nominations received by SpongeBob SquarePants
Years	Categories	(Nominees)	Results	Ref(s).
2010	Outstanding Special Class Animated Program	Dina Buteyn, Stephen Hillenburg, Paul Tibbitt	Won	
2010	Outstanding Directing in an Animated Program	Alan Smart, Andrew Overtoom, Tom Yasumi and Andrea Romano	Nominated	
2012	Outstanding Children's Animated Series	Stephen Hillenburg, Paul Tibbitt, Executive Producer and Jennie Monica Hammond	Nominated	
2012	Outstanding Directing in an Animated Program	Alan Smart, Tom Yasumi, Andrew Overtoom, Paul Tibbitt, Casey Alexander, Zeus Cervas, Aaron Springer, Nate Cash, Luke Brookshier, Zeus Cervas, Sean Charmatz, Vince Waller and Andrea Romano, Voice Director	Nominated	
2012	Outstanding Performer in an Animated Program	Rodger Bumpass as Squiadward	Nominated	
2012	Outstanding Sound Editing – Animation	Paulette Lifton, James Lifton, Kimberlee Vanek, Nick Carr, MIshelle Fordham, D.J. Lynch, Jeffrey Hutchins, Aran Tanchum, Matt Hall, Chris Gresham and Todd Brodie	Nominated	
2013	Outstanding Sound Editing – Animation	Paulette Lifton, Jimmy Lifton, Mishelle Fordham, DJ Lynch, Jeffrey Hutchins, Wes Otis, Aran Tanchum, Vincent Guisetti and Monique Reymond	Nominated	
2014	Outstanding Sound Editing – Animation	Devon Bowman, Nicolas Carr, Mishelle Fordham, Jeff Hutchins, Aran Tanchum and Vincent Guisetti	Won	
2018	Outstanding Children's Animated Series	Stephen Hillenburg, Marc Ceccarelli, Vincent Waller and Jennie Monica	Won	
2018	Outstanding Performer in an Animated Program	Tom Kenny as SpongeBob SquarePants	Won	
2020	Outstanding Performer in an Animated Program	Tom Kenny as SpongeBob SquarePants	Won	
2020	Outstanding Sound Mixing for an Animated Program	D.J. Lynch, Justin Brinsfield, Ryan Greene, Manny Grijalva, Jeff Hutchins, and Aran Tanchum	Nominated	
2021	Outstanding Performer in an Animated Program	Tom Kenny as SpongeBob SquarePants	Nominated	
2021	Outstanding Voice Directing for a Daytime Animated Series	Tom Kenny	Nominated	

==== Children's and Family Emmy Awards ====
List of Children's and Family Emmy Awards and nominations received by SpongeBob SquarePants
Year	Category	Nominated	Episode	Result
2022	Individual Achievement in Animation	Benjamin Arcand	"SpongeBob's Road to Christmas"	Won
2022	Outstanding Voice Performance in an Animated Program	Tom Kenny as SpongeBob SquarePants		Nominated
2023	Outstanding Voice Performance in a Children's or Young Teen Program	Tom Kenny as SpongeBob SquarePants		Nominated

=== Golden Reel Awards ===
The Golden Reel Awards are annual accolades presented by the American Motion Picture Sound Editors since 1953, honoring the year's best work in the field of sound editing. Since the show's debut, it has received eight wins.

Year	Category	Nominee(s)	Episode(s)	Result	Ref(s).
2000	Best Sound Editing in Television Animation – Music	Stephen Hillenburg, Donna Castricone, Nicholas R. Jennings, Alan Smart, Peter Burns, Mr. Lawrence, Derek Drymon, Alex Gordon, Donna Grillo, Jennie Monica, Krandal Crews, Jim Leber, Justin Brinsfield, Tony Ostyn, Nicolas Carr	"Mermaid Man and Barnacle Boy" and "Pickles"	Won	
2000	Best Sound Editing in Television Animation – Sound	Nicolas Carr	"Karate Choppers"	Won	
2001	Best Sound Editing in Television Animation – Sound	^{See below}	"Rock Bottom" and "Arrgh"	Won	
2002	Best Sound Editing in Television – Animation	Timothy J. Borquez, Jeff Hutchins, Daisuke Sawa	"Secret Box" and "Band Geeks"	Won	
2003	Best Sound Editing in Television Animation	^{See below}	"Nasty Patty" and "Idiot Box"	Won	
2003	Best Sound Editing in Television Animation – Music	Nicolas Carr	"Wet Painters" and "Krusty Krab Training Video"	Won	
2004	Best Sound Editing in Television Animation – Music	Nicolas Carr	"The Great Snail Race" and "Mid-Life Crustacean"	Won	
2008	Best Sound Editing in Television: Animated	^{See below}	"SpongeHenge"	Won	

=== Kids' Choice Awards ===
The Kids' Choice Awards is an awards show recognizing the year's best television, film, video games and music acts, as chosen by Nickelodeon viewers. First awarded in 1988, it has been described as "the loudest, sloppiest and funniest awards show around." The American awards show also has been localized in many countries. To date, SpongeBob SquarePants has won 23 Kids' Choice Awards, including eighteen straight in the Favorite Cartoon category. In 2008 SpongeBob's record ended; however, it was regained from 2009 onward. Aside from Avatar: The Last Airbender winning in 2008, other long-running nominees like The Loud House (8 nominations) and Teen Titans Go! (10 nominations) haven't won a blimp due to SpongeBob's winning streak.

List of Kids' Choice Awards and nominations received by SpongeBob SquarePants
Year	Category	Nominee(s)	Result	Ref(s).
2003	Favorite Cartoon	Rugrats / The Simpsons / Kim Possible	Won	
2004	Favorite Cartoon	The Fairly OddParents / The Proud Family / The Simpsons	Won	
2005	Favorite Cartoon	Ed, Edd n Eddy / The Fairly OddParents / The Simpsons	Won	
2006	Favorite Cartoon	The Adventures of Jimmy Neutron, Boy Genius / The Fairly OddParents / The Simpsons	Won	
2007	Favorite Cartoon	The Adventures of Jimmy Neutron, Boy Genius / The Fairly OddParents / The Simpsons	Won	
2009	Favorite Cartoon	The Fairly OddParents / The Simpsons / Phineas and Ferb	Won	
2010	Favorite Cartoon	The Simpsons / Phineas and Ferb / The Penguins of Madagascar	Won	
2011	Favorite Cartoon	The Penguins of Madagascar / Phineas and Ferb / Scooby Doo! Mystery Incorporated	Won	
2012	Favorite Cartoon	Phineas and Ferb / Scooby Doo! Mystery Incorporated / Kung Fu Panda: Legends of Awesomeness	Won	
2013	Favorite Cartoon	The Fairly OddParents / Phineas and Ferb / Tom and Jerry	Won	
2014	Favorite Animated Animal Sidekick	Patrick Star	Won	
2014	Favorite Cartoon	Phineas and Ferb / Adventure Time / Teenage Mutant Ninja Turtles	Won	
2015	Favorite Cartoon	Phineas and Ferb / The Fairly OddParents / Adventure Time / Teenage Mutant Ninja Turtles / Teen Titans Go!	Won	
2016	Favorite Cartoon	Phineas and Ferb / Alvinnn!!! and the Chipmunks / Gravity Falls / Lego Ninjago: Masters of Spinjitzu / The Amazing World of Gumball / Steven Universe / Teen Titans Go!	Won	
2017	Favorite Cartoon	Alvinnn!!! and the Chipmunks / The Amazing World of Gumball / Teenage Mutant Ninja Turtles / The Loud House / Teen Titans Go!	Won	
2018	Favorite Cartoon	Alvinnn!!! and the Chipmunks / The Loud House / The Simpsons / Teen Titans Go! / Teenage Mutant Ninja Turtles	Won	
2019	Favorite Cartoon	Alvinnn!!! and the Chipmunks / The Loud House / Teen Titans Go! / The Boss Baby: Back in Business / Rise of the Teenage Mutant Ninja Turtles	Won	
2020	Favorite Cartoon	Alvinnn!!! and the Chipmunks / Teen Titans Go! / The Loud House / The Simpsons / The Amazing World of Gumball	Won	
2021	Favorite Cartoon	Alvinnn!!! and the Chipmunks / Teen Titans Go! / The Loud House / Lego Jurassic World: Legend of Isla Nublar / The Boss Baby: Back In Business	Won	
2022	Favorite Cartoon	Teen Titans Go! / The Loud House / Looney Tunes Cartoons / Jurassic World Camp Cretaceous / The Smurfs	Won	
2023	Favorite Cartoon	Teen Titans Go! / The Loud House / Jurassic World Camp Cretaceous / The Smurfs / Rugrats	Won	
2024	Favorite Cartoon	Teen Titans Go! / The Loud House / The Simpsons / Big City Greens / Monster High	Won	
2025	Favorite Cartoon	Teen Titans Go! / The Loud House / The Simpsons / Monster High / Dragon Ball Daima	Won	

==== International versions ====
List of International Kids' Choice Awards and nominations received by SpongeBob SquarePants
Years	Countries	Categories	Results
2014	Argentina	Best Animated Series	Won
2015	Argentina	Best Animated Series	Won
2007	Australia	Fave Toon	Won
2008	Australia	Fave Toon	Won
2009	Australia	Fave Toon	Won
2010	Australia	Fave Toon	Won
2011	Australia	Fave Toon	Won
2003	Brazil	Favorite Cartoon	Won
2004	Brazil	Favorite Cartoon	Won
2005	Brazil	Favorite Cartoon	Won
2006	Brazil	Favorite Cartoon	Won
2008	Brazil	Favorite Cartoon	Won
2009	Brazil	Favorite Cartoon	Won
2010	Brazil	Favorite Cartoon	Won
2011	Brazil	Favorite Cartoon	Won
2012	Brazil	Favorite Cartoon	Won
2013	Brazil	Favorite Cartoon	Won
2015	Brazil	Favorite Cartoon	Won
2016	Brazil	Favorite Cartoon	Won
2017	Brazil	Favorite Cartoon	Won
2018	Brazil	Favorite Cartoon	Won
2019	Brazil	Favorite Cartoon	Won
2020	Brazil	Favorite Cartoon	Won
2021	Brazil	Favorite Nick Show	Won
2016	Colombia	Favorite Cartoon	Won
2017	Colombia	Favorite Cartoon	Won
2008	Indonesia	Favorite Cartoon	Won
2009	Indonesia	Favorite Cartoon	Won
2010	Indonesia	Favorite Cartoon	Won
2011	Indonesia	Favorite Cartoon	Won
2012	Indonesia	Favorite Cartoon	Won
2013	Indonesia	Favorite Cartoon	Won
2014	Indonesia	Favorite Cartoon	Won
2003	Mexico	Favorite Cartoon	Won
2013	Mexico	Favorite Cartoon	Won
2014	Mexico	Favorite Cartoon	Won
2015	Mexico	Favorite Cartoon	Won
2016	Mexico	Favorite Cartoon	Won
2017	Mexico	Favorite Cartoon	Won
2019	Mexico	Favorite Cartoon	Won
2020	Mexico	Favorite Nick Show	Won
2021	Mexico	Favorite Cartoon	Won
2007	United Kingdom	Favorite Cartoon	Won
2008	United Kingdom	Favorite Kids Cartoon	Won
2008	Philippines	Best Kids Cartoon	Won

=== Other awards ===
List of all other awards and nominations received by SpongeBob SquarePants
Year	Award	Category	Nominee(s)	Result	Ref(s).
2005	Annecy International Animated Film Festival	Special Award	"Fear of a Krabby Patty"	Won	
2011	Artios Awards	Outstanding Achievement in Casting – Television Animation	Sarah Noonan	Won	
2011	ASCAP Film and Television Music Awards	Top Television Series	^{See below}	Won	
2012	ASCAP Film and Television Music Awards	Top Television Series	^{See below}	Won	
2013	ASCAP Film and Television Music Awards	Top Television Series	^{See below}	Won	
2013	BMI Film & TV Awards	BMI Cable Award	Michael Bolger, Sage Guyton, Eban Schletter, and Jeremy Wakefield	Won	
2009	Teen Choice Awards	Choice TV Animated Show		Won	
2002	Television Critics Association Awards	Outstanding Achievement in Children's Programming		Won	
2010	TP de Oro	Best Children and Youth Program		Won	
2011	TP de Oro	Best Children and Youth Program		Won	
2012	TP de Oro	Best Children and Youth Program		Won	

== Awards for films ==
=== The SpongeBob SquarePants Movie ===
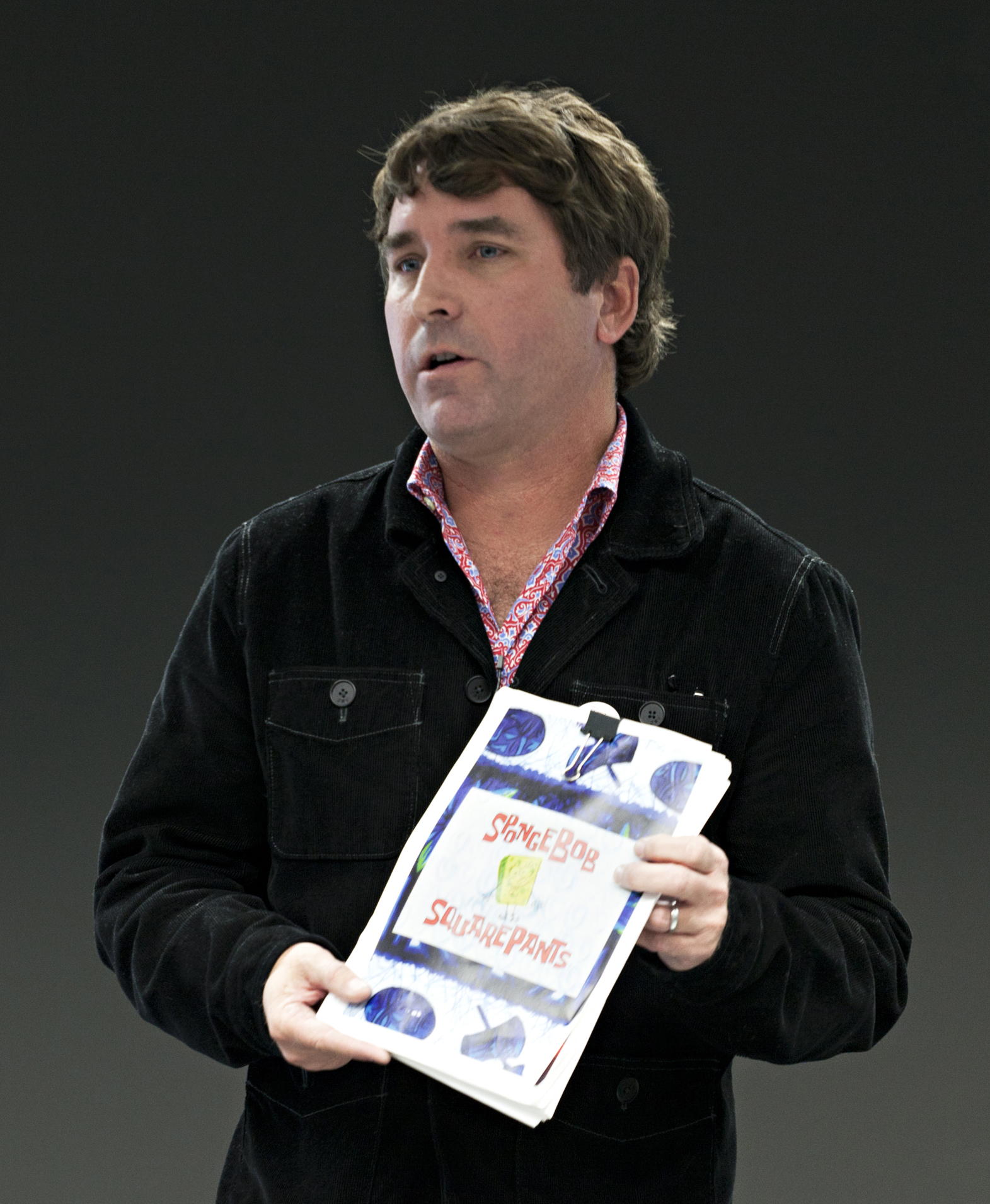
Series creator Stephen Hillenburg, director of The SpongeBob SquarePants Movie.

The SpongeBob SquarePants Movie is the first film adaptation of the television series. It was released on November 19, 2004, and has been a financial success, grossing over $140,000,000 worldwide.

List of awards and nominations received by The SpongeBob SquarePants Movie
Year	Award	Category	Nominee(s)	Result	Ref(s).
2005	Annie Awards	Best Animated Feature		Nominated	
2005	Annie Awards	Directing in an Animated Feature Production	Stephen Hillenburg	Nominated	
2005	Annie Awards	Music in an Animated Feature Production	Gregor Narholz	Nominated	
2005	ASCAP Film and Television Music Awards	Top Box Office Films	Gregor Narholz	Won	
2005	Australian Kids' Choice Awards	Fave Movie		Won	
2005	Golden Satellite Awards	Best Animated or Mixed Media Feature		Nominated	
2005	Golden Trailer Awards	Best Animation/Family		Nominated	
2005	Golden Trailer Awards	Most Original		Nominated	
2006	MTV Russia Movie Awards	Best Cartoon		Nominated	
2005	People's Choice Awards	Favorite Animated Movie		Nominated	
2005	Young Artist Awards	Best Family Feature Film – Animation		Nominated	

=== The SpongeBob Movie: Sponge Out of Water ===
The SpongeBob Movie: Sponge Out of Water is the second film adaptation of the series. It was released on February 6, 2015, and a total worldwide gross of $325.1 million.

List of awards and nominations received by The SpongeBob Movie: Sponge Out of Water
Year	Award	Category	Nominee(s)	Result	Ref(s).
2015	Kids' Choice Awards	Favorite Animated Movie		Nominated	
2015	Mexico Kids' Choice Awards	Favorite Movie		Nominated	
2015	British Academy Children's Awards	BAFTA Kids' Vote - Feature Film		Nominated	
2016	Annie Awards	Animated Effects in an Animated Production	Brice Mallier, Paul Buckley, Brent Droog, Alex Whyte, Jonothan Freisler	Nominated	
2016	Annie Awards	Voice Acting in an Animated Feature	Tom Kenny	Nominated	

=== The SpongeBob Movie: Sponge on the Run ===
The SpongeBob Movie: Sponge on the Run is the third film adaptation of the series. It was released in Canada on August 14, 2020, and a total worldwide gross of $4.810 million.

List of awards and nominations received by The SpongeBob Movie: Sponge on the Run
Year	Award	Category	Nominee(s)	Result	Ref(s).
2021	Visual Effects Society Awards	Outstanding Animated Character in an Animated Feature	Jacques Daigle, Guillaume Dufief, Adrien Montero, Liam Hill	Nominated	
2022	Kids' Choice Awards	Favorite Animated Movie		Nominated	
2022	Kids' Choice Awards	Favorite Voice in an Animated Movie	Tom Kenny	Nominated	
2022	Kids' Choice Awards	Favorite Voice in an Animated Movie	Awkwafina	Nominated	
2022	Kids' Choice Awards	Favorite Voice in an Animated Movie	Keanu Reeves	Nominated	

=== The SpongeBob Movie: Search for SquarePants ===
The SpongeBob Movie: Search for SquarePants is the fourth film adaptation of the series. It was released on December 19, 2025, and grossed over $169 million worldwide.

Award	Date of ceremony	Category	Recipient(s)	Result	Ref.
Annie Awards	February 21, 2026	Best Character Design – Feature	Adam Paloian, Thaddeus Couldron, Alvi Ramirez	Nominated	
Art Directors Guild Awards	February 28, 2026	Best Animated Feature Film	The SpongeBob Movie: Search for SquarePants – Sean Haworth and Pablo R. Mayer	Nominated	
Cinema Audio Society Awards	March 7, 2026	Outstanding Achievement in Sound Mixing for Motion Pictures - Animated	Will Files, Mark Paterson, Steve Neal (re-recording mixers), Shawn Murphy (scoring mixer), and Jordan McClain (foley mixer)	Nominated	
Kids' Choice Awards	November 14, 2026	Favorite Animated Movie	The SpongeBob Movie: Search for SquarePants	Pending	
Kids' Choice Awards	November 14, 2026	Favorite Male Animated Voice from a Movie	Tom Kenny	Pending	
Kids' Choice Awards	November 14, 2026	Favorite Villain	Mark Hamill	Pending	
Kids' Choice Awards	November 14, 2026	Favorite Song from a Movie	"Big Guy" – Ice Spice	Pending	
Saturn Awards	March 8, 2026	Best Animated Film	The SpongeBob Movie: Search for SquarePants	Nominated	

== Awards for the musical ==
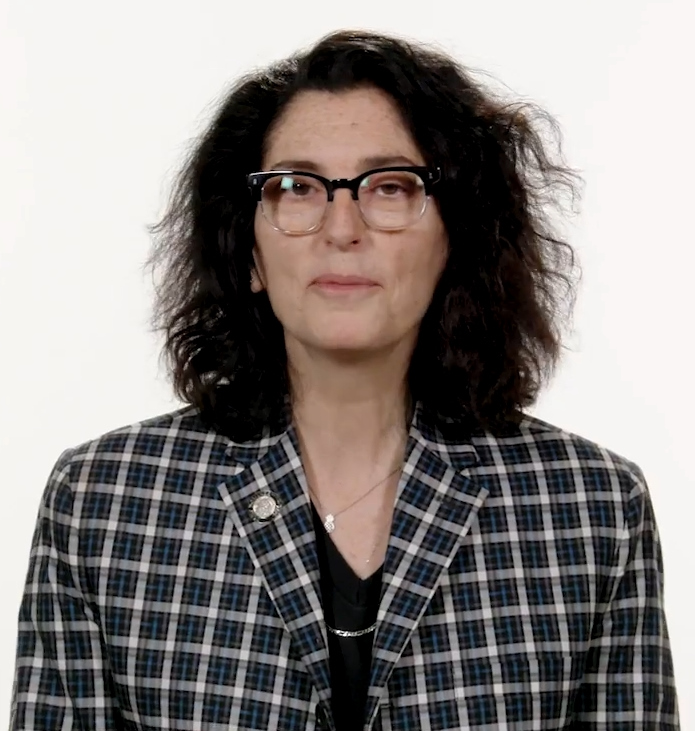
Tina Landau directed the musical and won 2 awards for her direction.

SpongeBob SquarePants: The Broadway Musical is the Broadway run of the stage musical adaptation of the series. The musical opened to critical acclaim, and tied with Mean Girls for the most-nominated production at the 72nd Tony Awards in 2018

Year	Award Ceremony	Category	Nominee	Result
2018	Outer Critics Circle Awards	Outstanding New Broadway Musical		Won
2018	Outer Critics Circle Awards	Outstanding Book of a Musical (Broadway or Off-Broadway)	Kyle Jarrow	Nominated
2018	Outer Critics Circle Awards	Outstanding New Score (Broadway or Off-Broadway)	Yolanda Adams, Steven Tyler, Joe Perry, Sara Bareilles, Jonathan Coulton, Alex Ebert, The Flaming Lips, Lady Antebellum, Cyndi Lauper, Rob Hyman, John Legend, Panic! At the Disco, Plain White T's, They Might Be Giants, T.I., Domani, Lil' C, David Bowie, Brian Eno, Andy Paley, Tom Kenny, Derek Drymon, Mark Harrison, Stephen Hillenburg, Blaise Smith & Tom Kitt	Won
2018	Outer Critics Circle Awards	Outstanding Director of a Musical	Tina Landau	Won^{1}
2018	Outer Critics Circle Awards	Outstanding Actor in a Musical	Ethan Slater	Won
2018	Outer Critics Circle Awards	Outstanding Featured Actor in a Musical	Gavin Lee	Nominated
2018	Outer Critics Circle Awards	Outstanding Choreographer	Christopher Gattelli	Nominated
2018	Outer Critics Circle Awards	Outstanding Set Design (Play or Musical)	David Zinn	Nominated
2018	Outer Critics Circle Awards	Outstanding Costume Design (Play or Musical)	David Zinn	Nominated
2018	Outer Critics Circle Awards	Outstanding Lighting Design (Play or Musical)	Kevin Adams	Nominated
2018	Outer Critics Circle Awards	Outstanding Orchestrations	Tom Kitt	Nominated
2018	Drama League Awards	Outstanding Production of a Broadway or Off-Broadway Musical		Nominated
2018	Drama Desk Awards			
2018	Drama Desk Awards	Outstanding Musical		Won
2018	Drama Desk Awards	Outstanding Actor in a Musical	Ethan Slater	Won
2018	Drama Desk Awards	Outstanding Featured Actor in a Musical	Gavin Lee	Won
2018	Drama Desk Awards	Outstanding Director of a Musical	Tina Landau	Won
2018	Drama Desk Awards	Outstanding Choreography	Christopher Gattelli	Nominated
2018	Drama Desk Awards	Outstanding Book of a Musical	Kyle Jarrow	Nominated
2018	Drama Desk Awards	Outstanding Orchestrations	Tom Kitt	Nominated
2018	Drama Desk Awards	Outstanding Set Design for a Musical	David Zinn	Won
2018	Drama Desk Awards	Outstanding Costume Design for a Musical	David Zinn	Nominated
2018	Drama Desk Awards	Outstanding Projection Design	Peter Nigrini	Nominated
2018	Drama Desk Awards	Outstanding Wig and Hair	Charles G. LaPointe	Won
2018	Chita Rivera Awards for Dance and Choreography	Outstanding Choreography in a Broadway Show	Christopher Gattelli	Nominated
2018	Chita Rivera Awards for Dance and Choreography	Outstanding Ensemble in a Broadway Show		Nominated
2018	Chita Rivera Awards for Dance and Choreography	Outstanding Male Dancer in a Broadway Show	Gavin Lee	Nominated
2018	Tony Awards			
2018	Tony Awards	Best Musical		Nominated
2018	Tony Awards	Best Performance by an Actor in a Leading Role in a Musical	Ethan Slater	Nominated
2018	Tony Awards	Best Performance by an Actor in a Featured Role in a Musical	Gavin Lee	Nominated
2018	Tony Awards	Best Book of a Musical	Kyle Jarrow	Nominated
2018	Tony Awards	Best Original Score	Yolanda Adams, Steven Tyler, Joe Perry, Sara Bareilles, Jonathan Coulton, Alex Ebert, Edward Sharpe, The Flaming Lips, Lady Antebellum, Cyndi Lauper, Rob Hyman, John Legend, Panic! at the Disco, Plain White T's, They Might Be Giants, T.I., Domani & Lil' C	Nominated
2018	Tony Awards	Best Direction of a Musical	Tina Landau	Nominated
2018	Tony Awards	Best Orchestrations	Tom Kitt	Nominated
2018	Tony Awards	Best Choreography	Christopher Gattelli	Nominated
2018	Tony Awards	Best Sound Design of a Musical	Walter Trarbach and Mike Dobson	Nominated
2018	Tony Awards	Best Scenic Design of a Musical	David Zinn	Won
2018	Tony Awards	Best Costume Design of a Musical	David Zinn	Nominated
2018	Tony Awards	Best Lighting Design of a Musical	Kevin Adams	Nominated
2018	Theatre World Award		Ethan Slater	Honoree

^{1} Tied with Bartlett Sher for My Fair Lady
