= Nickelodeon Australian Kids' Choice Awards 2008 =

2008 Australian award ceremony

2008 Nickelodeon Australian Kids' Choice Awards
- Date: 11 October 2008
- Location: Hisense Arena
- Hosted by: Natalie Bassingthwaighte

Television/radio coverage
- Network: Nickelodeon

The 6th annual Nickelodeon Australian Kids' Choice Awards were held on 11 October 2008 at the Hisense Arena in Melbourne. John Cena was picked to host the Nickelodeon Kids Choice Awards alongside Natalie Bassingthwaighte.

== Nominees & Winners ==
Winners in Bold

=== Random ===
==== So Hot Right Now ====
- Short Stack
- **Australian Idol**
- Dash and Will
- Jessica Mauboy
- Foo Fighters
- ABBA

==== Fave Movie ====
- Alvin and the Chipmunks
- Get Smart
- **Kung Fu Panda**
- Step Up 2: The Streets

==== Funniest Duo ====
- Dave Lawson and James Kerley
- Flight of the Conchords
- Hamish Blake and Andy Lee
- **Maude Garrett and Kyle Linahan**

==== Fave Music Show ====
- Dance on Sunset
- The Music Jungle
- **Video Hits**
- WhatUWant

==== Biggest Greenie ====
- **Bindi Irwin - Wildlife Warrior**
- Isabel Lucas - All-Round Green Goddess
- Merrick and Rosso - Carbon Neutral Comedians
- Nicole Kidman - UNICEF Ambassador

==== Fave Aussie ====
- **Rove McManus**
- Bindi Irwin
- Delta Goodrem
- Ricki-Lee Coulter

=== Music ===
==== Fave Singer ====
- Delta Goodrem
- Gabriella Cilmi
- **Ricki-Lee Coulter**
- Vanessa Amorosi

==== Fave Band ====
- Faker
- Jonas Brothers
- Operator Please
- **The Veronicas**

==== Fave Song ====
- Low - Flo Rida
- No Air - Jordin Sparks and Chris Brown
- **Shake It - Metro Station**
- Untouched - The Veronicas

==== Fave International Band ====
- Fall Out Boy
- Panic! at the Disco
- Paramore
- **Simple Plan**

==== Fave International Singer ====
- Chris Brown
- **Miley Cyrus**
- Pink
- Rihanna

=== TV ===
==== Fave Comedy Show ====
- **Drake & Josh**
- Hannah Montana
- iCarly
- Mortified

==== Fave Toon ====
Was not on the broadcast

- Avatar
- Family Guy
- **SpongeBob SquarePants**
- The Simpsons

==== Fave Drama Show ====
- Blue Water High
- **H_{2}O: Just Add Water**
- Home and Away
- Neighbours

==== Fave Reality TV Show ====
- Australia's Next Top Model
- Australian Idol
- Football Superstar
- **So You Think You Can Dance**

==== Fave Action Show ====
- Camp Orange
- **Friday Night Live**
- Wipeout
- WWE

=== Stars ===
==== Fave Sports Stars ====
- Casey Stoner
- Grant Hackett
- **John Cena**
- Ryan Sheckler

==== Fave International TV Stars ====
Was not on the broadcast

- Ashley Tisdale - The Suite Life of Zack & Cody
- Drake Bell - Drake & Josh
- **Miley Cyrus - Hannah Montana**
- Miranda Cosgrove - iCarly

==== Fave Movie Star ====
Was not on the broadcast

- Anne Hathaway
- Emma Roberts
- Jack Black
- **Zac Efron**

==== Fave TV Star ====
- Andrew G - Australian Idol
- Dean Geyer - Neighbours
- Lincoln Lewis - Home and Away
- **Rove McManus - Are You Smarter Than a 5th Grader?**

== Official Soundtrack ==
Nickelodeon Kids' Choice Awards 2008

Compilation album by Various Artists
- Released: 4 October 2008
- Recorded: Various Times
- Genre: Pop
- Label: SonyBMG Australia

Series chronology
Nickelodeon Kids' Choice Awards 2007 (2007)	Nickelodeon Kids' Choice Awards 2008 (2008)	Nickelodeon Kids' Choice Awards 2009 (2009)

An official soundtrack for the awards show was released on 4 October 2008.

1. Metro Station - Shake It
2. The Veronicas - This Love
3. Rihanna - Take a Bow
4. The Presets - This Boy's in Love
5. Chris Brown - With You
6. Britney Spears - Break the Ice
7. Pnau - Baby
8. The Potbelleez - Don't Hold Back
9. Newton Faulkner - Dream Catch Me
10. Axle Whitehead - I Don't Do Surprises
11. Operator Please - Two for My Seconds
12. Delta Goodrem - You Will Only Break My Heart
13. Brian McFadden - Twisted
14. Sara Bareilles - Love Song
15. Faker - This Heart Attack
16. Ashlee Simpson - Outta My Head (Ay Ya Ya)
17. Jordin Sparks/Chris Brown - No Air
18. Colbie Caillat - Bubbly
19. The Galvatrons - When We Were Kids
20. September - Cry For You
21. Rogue Traders - I Never Liked You
