= Nickelodeon Australian Kids' Choice Awards 2005 =

2005 Australian award ceremony

2005 Nickelodeon Australian Kids' Choice Awards
- Date: 20 September 2005
- Location: Sydney Entertainment Centre
- Hosted by: Jesse McCartney, James Kerley and Dave Lawson

Television/radio coverage
- Network: Nickelodeon

The third annual Nickelodeon Australian Kids' Choice Awards were held at the Sydney Entertainment Centre on 20 September 2005. The show was hosted by Jesse McCartney, James Kerley and Dave Lawson.

== Nominees and winners ==
Winners in Bold.

=== Music ===
==== Fave Music Artist ====
- Delta Goodrem
- **Guy Sebastian**
- Jesse McCartney
- Anthony Callea

==== Fave Music Group ====
- Simple Plan
- Green Day
- **Destiny's Child**
- Good Charlotte

==== Fave Music Video ====
- Delta Goodrem – A Little Too Late
- Gwen Stefani – Hollaback Girl
- **Guy Sebastian – Oh Oh**
- Evermore – Come to Nothing

=== Movies ===
==== Fave Movie Star ====
- **Hilary Duff**
- Will Smith
- Lindsay Lohan
- Ben Stiller

==== Fave Movie ====
- Raise Your Voice
- Hating Alison Ashley
- The Incredibles
- **SpongeBob SquarePants Movie**

=== TV ===
==== Fave TV Star ====
- Rebecca Cartwright
- Jesse McCartney
- Amanda Bynes
- **Jason Smith**

==== Fave TV Show ====
- The O.C.
- Home and Away
- **The Simpsons**
- Unfabulous

=== People ===
==== Fave Sports Star ====
- **Ian Thorpe**
- Lleyton Hewitt
- Jodie Henry
- Liz Ellis

==== Fave Aussie ====
- Delta Goodrem
- Rebecca Cartwright
- **Guy Sebastian**
- Ian Thorpe

==== Fave Rising Star ====
- Emma Roberts
- Indiana Evans
- JoJo
- **Sonny Bill Williams**

==== Fave Old Fart ====
- Ian "Dicko" Dickson
- **Mark Holden**
- Bert Newton
- Alf Stewart

==== Fave Celeb Duo ====
- The Sarvo Boys
- Rebecca Cartwright and Lleyton Hewitt
- **Andrew G and James Mathison**
- Merrick and Rosso

==== Fave Meanie ====
- **Big Brother**
- Angelica Pickles
- Kyle Sandilands
- Mark Holden

==== Fave Hottie ====
- **Jesse McCartney**
- Guy Sebastian
- Chad Michael Murray
- Chris Hemsworth

=== Random ===
==== Fave Book ====
- **Harry Potter series**
- Hating Alison Ashley
- Lemony Snicket series
- The Lord of the Rings series

==== Fave Video Game ====
- **The SpongeBob SquarePants Movie Game**
- Need for Speed: Underground 2
- EyeToy: Play 2
- SingStar Party

==== Fave Animal Star ====
- Bootsy (Sarvo)
- Toby (Dr Katrina Warren's dog)
- **Donkey from Shrek**
- Spike from Rugrats

==== Fave Pash ====
- Seth and Summer (on The O.C.)
- Sharon Strezlecki and Ian Thorpe (at the Logies)
- James Kerley and Alyssa Milano (on the Orange Carpet at the US Kids' Choice Awards)
- **Tash and Robbie (on Home and Away)**
