= Nickelodeon Australian Kids' Choice Awards 2006 =

2006 Australian award ceremony

2006 Nickelodeon Australian Kids' Choice Awards
- Date: 11 October 2006
- Location: Sydney Entertainment Centre
- Hosted by: Sophie Monk, Dave Lawson and James Kerley

Television/radio coverage
- Network: Nickelodeon

The fourth annual Nickelodeon Australian Kids' Choice Awards were held on 11 October 2006 at the Sydney Entertainment Centre in Sydney. The show was hosted by Sophie Monk, Dave Lawson and James Kerley. The nominees were announced on 10 August 2006 and closed on 20 September 2006. Lindsay Lohan was originally lined up to host the 2006 awards, but was unable to attend. Bindi Irwin made her first public appearance at the 2006 awards ceremony since her father's (Steve Irwin) memorial service.

== Nominees and winners ==
Winners in Bold

=== Music ===
==== Fave Australian Artist ====
- Shannon Noll
- **Ricki-Lee Coulter**
- Lee Harding
- Guy Sebastian

==== Fave Australian Group ====
- Young Divas
- Living End
- **The Veronicas**
- Rogue Traders

==== Fave International Artist ====
- **Hilary Duff**
- Chris Brown
- Nick Lachey
- Rihanna

==== Fave International Group ====
- **Green Day**
- The Black Eyed Peas
- Simple Plan
- Good Charlotte

==== Fave Song ====
- When It All Falls Apart - The Veronicas
- Forever Young - Youth Group
- Voodoo Child - Rogue Traders
- **This Time I Know It's for Real - Young Divas**

=== Movies ===
==== Fave Movie ====
- Harry Potter and the Goblet of Fire
- She's the Man
- **High School Musical**
- Ice Age: The Meltdown

==== Fave Movie Star (male) ====
- Daniel Radcliffe
- Hugh Jackman
- **Jack Black**
- Rupert Grint

==== Fave Movie Star (female) ====
- **Hilary Duff**
- Emma Watson
- Lindsay Lohan
- Amanda Bynes

=== TV ===
==== Fave Toon ====
- SpongeBob SquarePants
- **The Simpsons**
- Fairly OddParents
- Kim Possible

==== Fave TV Show ====
- **Blue Water High**
- Home and Away
- Drake & Josh
- Neighbours

==== Fave TV Star ====
- **Kate Ritchie**
- Stephanie McIntosh
- Chris Hemsworth
- Grant Denyer

=== People ===
==== Fave Aussie ====
- **Guy Sebastian**
- Ian Thorpe
- Anthony Callea
- Nicole Kidman

==== Fave Celeb Duo ====
- Kath & Kim
- **Dave Lawson and James Kerley**
- Rebecca Cartwright and Lleyton Hewitt
- The Veronicas

==== Funniest Person ====
- James Kerley
- Dave Lawson
- James Mathison
- **Rove McManus**

==== Fave Old Fart ====
- **Ian "Dicko" Dickson**
- Daryl Somers
- David "Kochie" Koch
- Bert Newton

==== Fave Sports Star (female) ====
- Libby Lenton
- Alicia Molik
- Leisel Jones
- **Liz Ellis**

==== Fave Sports Star (male) ====
- Grant Hackett
- Lucas Neill
- Brett Lee
- **Lleyton Hewitt**

=== Hotties ===
==== Fave Hottie (female) ====
- **Stephanie McIntosh**
- Natalie Bassingthwaighte
- Lara Bingle
- Isabel Lucas

==== Fave Hottie (male) ====
- **Lee Harding**
- Dan O'Connor
- Chris Hemsworth
- Adam Saunders

==== So Hot Right Now ====
- **Australian Idol**
- The Socceroos
- Young Divas
- WWE

=== Random ===
==== Fave Book ====
- **Harry Potter Series**
- The Chronicles of Narnia
- A Series of Unfortunate Events
- Anthony Callea: The Official Story

==== Fave Console Game ====
- PSP - Loco Roco
- PS2 – Buzz!: The Big Quiz
- PS2 – Tony Hawk's American Wasteland
- **Nintendo DS - Nintendogs**

==== Fave Podcast ====
- **Camp Orange Maudecast**
- Bus Stop Sarvo
- MuggleCast
- Hamish and Andy
