= Nickelodeon Australian Kids' Choice Awards 2007 =

2007 Australian award ceremony

2007 Nickelodeon Australian Kids' Choice Awards
- Date: 10 October 2007
- Location: Sydney Entertainment Centre
- Hosted by: The Veronicas and Zac Efron

Television/radio coverage
- Network: Nickelodeon

The fifth annual Nickelodeon Australian Kids' Choice Awards were held on 10 October 2007 at the Sydney Entertainment Centre. The show was hosted by The Veronicas and Zac Efron. Voting for the nominees of the awards commenced on 1 July 2007 and ended on 22 July 2007 and on 1 August 2007 the full list of nominees were announced with new category Biggest Greenie (who is the person kids think is doing most to save the planet). On 14 August 2007 the voting commenced. Torrie Wilson and Bobby Lashley were also scheduled to appear.

== Guests ==
- The Veronicas - Co-Hosts
- Zac Efron - Co-Host
- Torrie Wilson
- Bobby Lashley

== Performers ==
- Good Charlotte
- Dean Geyer
- Ricki-Lee
- Shannon Noll
- The Veronicas

== Nominees & Winners ==
Winners in Bold.

=== Music ===
==== Fave Female Singer ====
- **Ricki-Lee**
- Amy Pearson
- Kate Miller-Heidke
- Missy Higgins

==== Fave Male Singer ====
- **Shannon Noll**
- Dean Geyer
- Anthony Callea
- Guy Sebastian

==== Fave Band ====
- **The Veronicas**
- Operator Please
- Rogue Traders
- Sneaky Sound System

==== Fave International Singer ====
- **Pink**
- Hilary Duff
- Justin Timberlake
- Mika

==== Fave International Band ====
- **Good Charlotte**
- Hinder
- Maroon 5
- Panic! at the Disco

==== Fave Song ====
- **Fall Out Boy — Thnks Fr Th Mmrs**
- Avril Lavigne — Girlfriend
- Naked Brothers Band — Crazy Car
- Rihanna — Umbrella

=== TV ===
==== Fave Nick Show ====
- **Drake & Josh**
- Camp Orange
- Unfabulous
- Zoey 101

==== Favorite Cartoon ====
- **SpongeBob SquarePants**
- The Simpsons
- Avatar: The Last Airbender
- Ben 10

==== Fave TV Show ====
- **Australian Idol**
- Australia's Funniest Home Videos
- Big Brother
- Home and Away

==== Fave Female TV Star ====
- **Bree Amer**
- Caitlin Stasey
- Indiana Evans
- Sophie Luck

==== Favorite Male TV Star ====
- **Rove McManus**
- Adam Hills
- Bobby Morley
- Mike Goldman

=== PEOPLE ===
==== Fave Hottie ====
- **Dean Geyer**
- Jennifer Hawkins
- Lucas Neill
- Natalie Bassingthwaighte

==== Fave Celebrity Duo ====
- **Hamish & Andy**
- James Mathison & Andrew G
- Maude & Kyle
- The Veronicas

=== MOVIES ===
==== Fave Movie ====
- **Shrek the Third**
- Happy Feet
- Nancy Drew
- Night at the Museum

==== Fave Movie Star ====
- **Zac Efron**
- Emma Roberts
- Nicole Kidman
- Shia LaBeouf

=== THE BIG 3 ===
==== So Hot Right Now ====
- **High School Musical 2**
- Naked Brothers Band
- Silverchair & Powderfinger
- WWE Raw

==== Biggest Greenie ====
- **Bindi Irwin**
- Ian Thorpe
- John Butler
- Peter Garrett

==== Fave Aussie ====
- **Bindi Irwin**
- Hugh Jackman
- Kate Ritchie
- Rove McManus
