= Nick Takes Over Your School =

- Presented by: Lizzie Trevan; Dave Lawson
- No. of seasons: 7

Original release
- Network: Nickelodeon
- Release: March 4, 1998 – 2004

Nick Takes Over Your School is the title of a Nickelodeon Australia reality show that ran from 1998 - 2004.

== Format ==
Nickelodeon Australia Personalities would visit schools around Australia, have a look around, and feature a game with kids vs. teachers. The teachers would generally lose, and kids were given pieces of Nickelodeon Merchandise.

== Host ==
Lizzie Trevan hosted the first six series. In the seventh series of the show, Dave Lawson, a well known Nickelodeon Australia Personality, was the host.

== Cancellation ==
After the seventh series of the show, Nickelodeon Australia decided to cancel "Nick Takes Over Your School" to focus more on "Sarvo" and "Saturday Nick Television". Saturday Nick Television was cancelled one year later.

== See also ==
- Nickelodeon Australia
- XYZnetworks - owner of Nickelodeon Australia
- Dave Lawson
- Sarvo
- Saturday Nick Television
- Camp Orange - a reality television series aired on Nickelodeon Australia, often seen as a replacement of Nick Takes Over Your School.
- Camp Orange: Slimey Hollow
