= Nickelodeon Australian Kids' Choice Awards 2010 =

2010 Nickelodeon Australian Kids' Choice Awards
- Date: 8 October 2010
- Location: Sydney Entertainment Centre
- Hosted by: Liam Hemsworth, Jessica Mauboy, Jerry Trainor

Television/radio coverage
- Network: Nickelodeon

The 8th annual Nickelodeon Australian Kids' Choice Awards was held on Friday 8 October 2010 at the Sydney Entertainment Centre. Nomination entries closed on 1 August 2010 and the nominees for this year's season, were revealed on 15 August 2010. It was also revealed that Jessica Watson received the Nickelodeon Platinum Achievement award. Nickelodeon Australia rebranded during these Awards.

The Kids' Choice Awards was hosted by Liam Hemsworth, Jessica Mauboy and Jerry Trainor. There were live performances by Short Stack, Amy Meredith, Cody Simpson and Justice Crew.

== Winners and nominees ==
=== Book ===
Best Book

- Twilight Series Winner
- Tomorrow, When the War Began
- Harry Potter and the Deathly Hallows
- Diary of a Wimpy Kid

=== Music ===
Fresh Aussie Musos

- Amy Meredith
- Stan Walker
- Cody Simpson Winner
- Orianthi

Fave Aussie Musos

- Jessica Mauboy Winner
- Vanessa Amorosi
- Short Stack
- Guy Sebastian

Fave International Band

- Glee
- The Black Eyed Peas Winner
- Paramore
- Big Time Rush

Fave Song

- "Telephone" Lady Gaga featuring Beyoncé
- "California Gurls" - Katy Perry featuring Snoop Dogg Winner
- "TiK ToK" - Ke$ha
- "In My Head" - Jason Derulo

=== TV ===
Fave TV Show

- iCarly Winner
- Glee
- Wizards of Waverly Place
- Camp Orange: Castle Mountain

Big Nick House

- Big Time Rush Winner
- iCarly
- Victorious

Fave TV Star

- Miranda Cosgrove (iCarly)
- Big Time Rush
- Hutch Dano (Zeke & Luther)
- Lea Michele (Glee)
- Selena Gomez (Wizards of Waverly Place) Winner

Fave Reality Show

- Camp Orange Winner
- The Biggest Loser Australia
- Australia's Got Talent
- MasterChef Australia

Top Toon

- SpongeBob SquarePants Winner
- The Simpsons
- Phineas and Ferb
- Avatar: The Last Airbender

=== People ===
The LOL Award

- Luke and Wyatt
- Hamish and Andy
- iCarly Cast Winner
- Shaun Micallef

Cutest Couple

- Zac Efron & Vanessa Hudgens Winner
- Miranda Kerr & Orlando Bloom
- Miley Cyrus & Liam Hemsworth
- Robert Pattinson & Kristen Stewart

Hottest Hottie

- Justin Bieber
- Taylor Lautner Winner
- Rachael Finch
- Taylor Swift

Awesome Aussie

- Bindi Irwin
- Rove McManus Winner
- Tim Cahill
- Torah Bright

Platinum Achievement Award

- Jessica Watson

Big Kid Award

- Josh Thomas
- Luke and Wyatt
- Jerry Trainor
- Drake Bell Winner

=== Movies ===
Fave Animated Movie

- Open Season 3 Winner
- Shrek Forever After
- Toy Story 3
- How to Train Your Dragon

Favourite Movie Star

- Miley Cyrus Winner
- Kristen Stewart
- Robert Pattinson
- Xavier Samuel

Fave Kiss

- Miley Cyrus & Liam Hemsworth - The Last Song Winner
- Kristen Stewart & Taylor Lautner - The Twilight Saga: Eclipse
- Kristen Stewart & Robert Pattinson - The Twilight Saga: Eclipse
- Taylor Lautner & Taylor Swift - Valentine's Day
