= The Dave & Kerley Show =

- Genre: Variety; Music
- Country of origin: Australia
- Original language: English
- No. of seasons: 1
- No. of episodes: 13

Original release
- Network: Channel V Australia
- Release: 6 April – 29 June 2008

The Dave & Kerley Show is an Australian television series that airs on Channel [V]. It first began airing on 6 April 2008, and had a run of 13 episodes, finishing on 29 June 2008. It is hosted by Dave Lawson and James Kerley, who had previously hosted Nickelodeon's Sarvo together for two years from 2005 to 2007.
