= Saturday Nick Television =

- Also known as: sn:tv
- Genre: Children's television
- Based on: SMTV Live by Blaze Television
- Presented by: Natalie Garonzi (Season 1); Dave Lawson (Seasons 1-2); David "Kambo" Kambouris (Season 1); Jesse Tobin (Season 2); Emily Perry
- Country of origin: Australia
- No. of seasons: 2

Production
- Production locations: Melbourne, Victoria, Australia
- Camera setup: Multi-camera
- Production company: Burberry Productions

Original release
- Network: Nickelodeon
- Release: 2002 – 2005

Saturday Nick TV (commonly referred to as sn:TV) was a weekend morning show aired on Nickelodeon Australia from 10am to 2pm on Saturday. It was produced by Burberry Productions and shot in Melbourne. It was started with the help of Britney Spears.

== Format ==
The show was the Australian version of the highly popular SMTV Live in the UK hosted originally by Ant & Dec and Cat Deeley. In both seasons, the show began at 10am, (following "Double Up", an early morning block of back to back Nicktoons on weekend mornings) with a short introduction, and then premiere of a new episode of a favourite Nickelodeon show. (Shows such as SpongeBob SquarePants, The Fairly OddParents, Saved by the Bell and in Series One CatDog were generally shown). Then various segments and skits would be performed. In Series One, celebrities in Australia (such as Britney Spears, who helped launch the show) would be featured in the "Strip Search" where Natalie Garonzi would ask as many questions in one minute as she could such as "Cats Or Dogs?", "Peanut Butter or Vegemite", and "Shower or Bath". During the show, four half-hour Nickelodeon shows would be played. "Mates", a panto-style sketch, was always the last segment (as the outro, while the credits were displayed) in the first and second season.

=== Series one ===
Series One was very successful, sn:tv being the first show on Foxtel to beat The Simpsons from its #1 rating position in more than 7 years. Segments such as "Wonkey Donkey" and "Mates" (a parody of the television show Friends based on a Chums sketch.) attracting viewers of all ages. The format included an audience attending ABC Studios in Melbourne and various game shows such as "Strip Search" and "Challenge Dave", where host Natalie Garonzi would mediate a battle of the wits between Dave Lawson and an audience member. The winner would receive a Nickelodeon Merchandise Pack, the loser would receive a "Snot Pot" (another piece of Nickelodeon Merchandise). The series was launched with the help of Britney Spears and had US guests such as Destiny's Child, Justin Timberlake and Jennifer Love Hewitt.

=== Series two ===
After the success of series one, and the leaving of two hosts (Kambo and Nat), Nickelodeon decided to give the show a new format, with new segments and new look. (Although the sets were renovated, it was still shot in Melbourne and still used the same logo). The only segment kept was "Mates" (due to its success). The audience members, would, at the beginning of the show be divided into two-halves. The teams would nominate their names (after a Nickelodeon show - e.g. The Catdogs or The Angry Beavers) and various games would be played - usually one kid from a team versing a kid from the other team, although sometimes against hosts (e.g. Jesse would verse a kid, to see who could balance a rotten egg on their head the longest). The games usually involved mess of some sort (e.g. one game, titled 'Vomit Comet' involved Dave and Emily giving questions to the kids on stage on the opposing teams with 'yes' or 'no' answers. If the kid hesitated, said 'ah' 'um', 'yes' or 'no', the kid on the other team would win and receive points, whereas the other team member would go into an elevator, and have a bucket of artificial slime poured on his head) By the end of the show, the team with the most points would each receive a piece of Nickelodeon Merchandise. Celebrities were featured less on sn:tv than in the first season - the second season was more focused on kids.

== Hosts ==
- Natalie Garonzi (Season 1)
- Dave Lawson (Season 1 & 2)
- David "Kambo" Kambouris (Season 1)
- Jesse Tobin (Season 2)
- Emily Perry (Season 2)

The first season of sn:tv (which premiered in 2002) saw the introduction of Dave Lawson, a once popular Nickelodeon personality. Dave was in both seasons of sn:tv, and, after the show's, cancellation, moved on to host 'Sarvo temporarily with other first season sn:TV hosts "Kambo" (David Kambouris) and "Nat" (Natalie Garonzi), then moved on to host Camp Orange, a reality television show for kids, and then back to Sarvo with James Kerley (who began hosting 'Sarvo in mid 2003, after winning the Sarvote competition with Tony "T-Bone" Brockman) due to the leaving of Brockman. He hosted the Nickelodeon Australian Kids' Choice Awards in 2006 with Kerley and Sophie Monk. Dave left Sarvo, and the Nickelodeon network on 23 February 2007.

== Cancellation ==
Nickelodeon decided to cancel sn:tv in 2005 after two shows, due to the lack of viewer numbers.

To bridge the gap on Saturday mornings/afternoons, two new shows were introduced. Slam is currently a two-hour block of action cartoons, and Sarvo Rewind was a 30-minute wrap up of weekday afternoon show Sarvo that week, until being canceled in late 2006. Perry and Tobin have never been seen on Nickelodeon since 2005, however Lawson continued to work with the network until announcing his intention to leave the network on 16 February 2007.

== See also ==
- Nickelodeon
- Dave Lawson
- Sarvo
