= Natalie Garonzi =

Natalie Garonzi is an Australian actress, writer, comedian and TV presenter. She worked both nationally and internationally as a model for many years appearing in campaigns and on catwalks around the globe for the likes of Chanel, Armani and Vera Wang and international publications like Elle Magazine, Cosmopolitan and Grazia. She then began her television career on Nickelodeon Australia, where she appeared on Saturday Nick Television and Sarvo. She has also presented numerous other television shows, including Wedding Switch as well as the Australian version of the US series of Playing It Straight and X Factor Australia on the Seven Network.

== Television and film career ==
Garonzi began her Australian TV career on Nickelodeon, hosting many TV shows on the network and was a co-host the night of the first ever Nickelodeon Australian Kids' Choice Awards.

She starred as Brie in the Australian feature film You and Your Stupid Mate.

Garonzi hosted the live to air program The Mint on GTV Channel 9 until its cancellation. She hosted numerous reality shows on Australian Network TV and repeats of Playing It Straight are being aired on Foxtel on the TV network Arena. She starred in The Comedy Channel's improvised comedy series Comedy Slapdown, starring comedians Julia Zemiro, Greig Pickhaver (as H. G. Nelson) and Julia Morris, and was the captain of the winning team for the overall series. She had appearances on many panel shows including Good Morning Australia, Rove, Today and The Project, and captained the team on Japanese spoof TV show Hole in the Wall.

Garonzi was a backstage host for The X Factor Australia and the host of The Xtra Factor, a live 'after the main show' on 7Two; however, the show was a contractual obligation to the network for only one year and therefore not brought back for the subsequent series of main show.

Garonzi was the only Australian comedian asked to perform live on stage with Martin Short for his 2012 Australian tour. She was also a credited writer and co-host of Uplate! on channel GO! with James Kerley and Shura Taft.

She started her radio career on HIT 105, formerly B105, and then worked for many years in both the breakfast and drive shifts on Nova 106.9 in Brisbane.

She is now working as a speaker and MC, comedy writer, screenwriter and ghost writer and recently wrote a one-man show for Rob Mills that was nominated for two Helpmann Awards.
