= List of awards and nominations received by Jessie J =

Jessie J awards and nominations
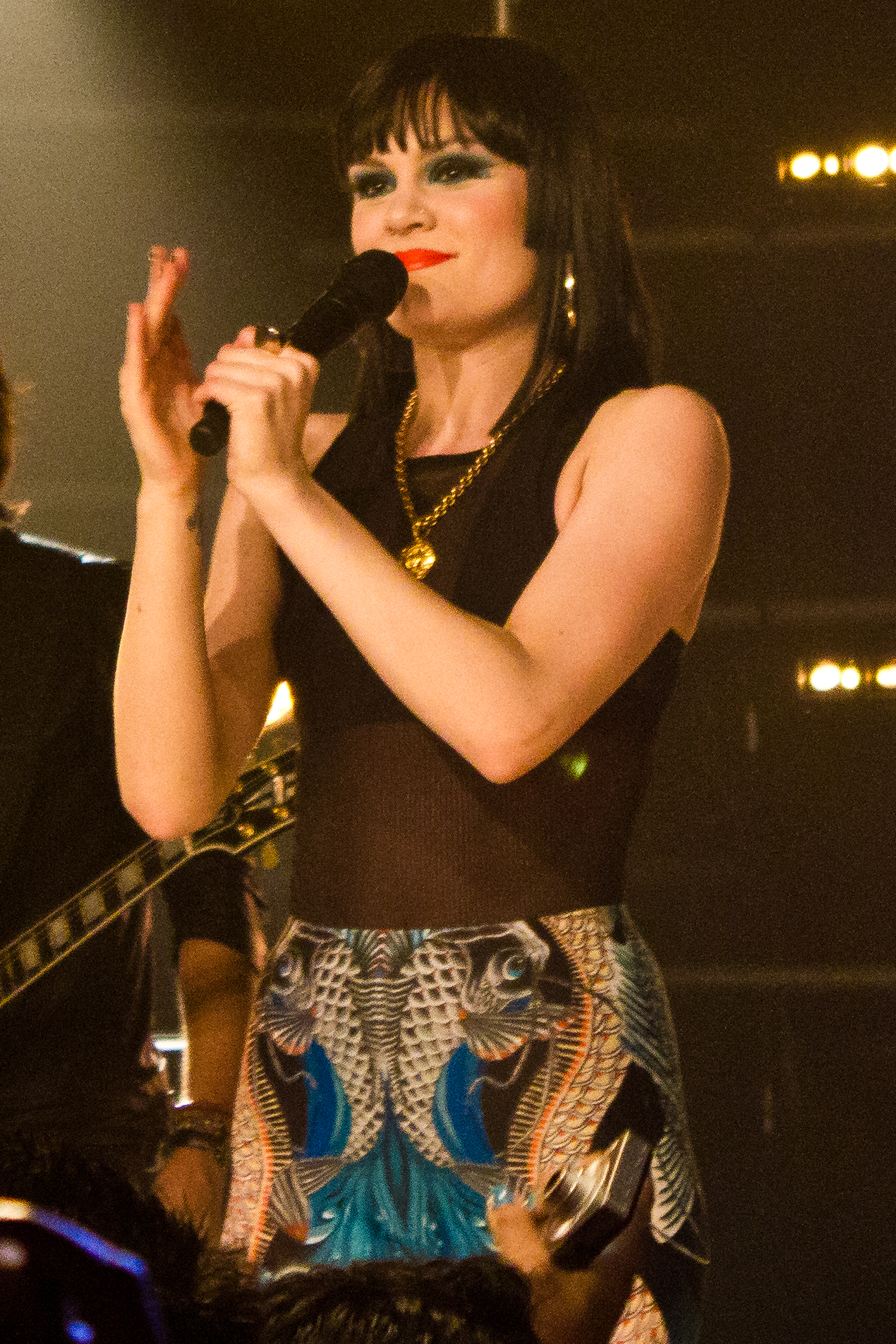
- Jessie J performing in New York City in 2011
Awards & Nominations
Award	Won	Nominated
Arqiva Commercial Radio Awards	1	1
Sound of...	1	1
Brit Awards	1	4
BT Digital Music Awards	3	4
Capital FM Awards	4	1
Grammy Awards	0	1
Harper's Bazaar Women of the Year Awards	1	1
MOBO Awards	5	8
Greek Internet awards	21	23
PopCrush Music Awards	1	1
Q Awards	1	3
Silver Clef Awards	1	1
UK Music Video Awards	0	1
Urban Music Awards	1	4
Virgin Media Music Awards	1	5
We Love Pop Awards	2	5
- Total number of wins and nominations
Totals	44	64

The list of awards and nominations Jessie J has received during her career.

== ARIA Music Awards ==
The ARIA Music Awards is the annual Australian music awards ceremony. In 2011, Jessie J has received one nomination.

Year	Nominated work	Award	Result
2011	Jessie J	Most Popular International Artist	Nominated

== APRA Music Awards ==
APRA Awards are several award ceremonies run in Australia and New Zealand by Australasian Performing Right Association to recognise songwriting skills, sales and airplay performance by its members annually. Jessie J has been nominated once.

Year	Nominated work	Award	Result
2011	Price Tag	International Work of the Year	Nominated

== ASCAP Pop Music Awards ==
The American Society of Composers, Authors and Publishers (ASCAP) is a not-for-profit performance rights organisation that protects its members' musical copyrights by monitoring public performances of their music, whether via a broadcast or live performance, and compensating them accordingly.

Year	Nominated work	Award	Result
2015	Most Performed Songs	"Bang Bang" (with Ariana Grande and Nicki Minaj)	Won

== Australian Nickelodeon Kid's Choice Awards ==
The Nickelodeon Australian Kids' Choice Awards is an annual awards show which awards entertainers with a blimp trophy, as voted by kids. Jessie J has received one nomination in 2011.

Year	Nominated work	Award	Result
2011	"Price Tag"	Favourite Song	Nominated

== BBC Radio 1Xtra Hot Summer Awards ==
Year	Nominee / work	Award	Result	Ref.
2013	"Excuse My Rude"	Hottest Guest	Nominated	

== Billboard Women in Music ==
Established in 2007, Billboard Woman of the Year is presented annually at Billboard Women in Music, and honours female contributions to the business, and leadership in embracing the changing music. Other awards to female artists are presented during the ceremony.

Year	Nominee / work	Award	Result
2014	Jessie J	Powerhouse	Won

== BMI Awards ==
=== BMI London Music Awards ===
Year	Nominee / work	Award	Result
2016	Bang Bang ( feat. Nicki Minaj & Ariana Grande)	Award Winning Songs	Won

== Brit Awards ==
The Brit Awards are the British Phonographic Industry's (BPI) annual pop music awards. Jessie J has received one award from seven nominations.

Year	Nominated work	Award	Result
2011	Jessie J	Critic's Choice	Won
2012	Jessie J	British Female Solo Artist	Nominated
2012	Jessie J	British Breakthrough Artist	Nominated
2012	"Price Tag"	British Single	Nominated
2013	"Domino"	British Single	Nominated
2014	Jessie J	British Female Solo Artist	Nominated
2016	"Flashlight"	British Video	Nominated

== BT Digital Music Awards ==
The BT Digital Music Awards are held annually in the United Kingdom. Jessie J has won three awards from four nominations.

Year	Nominated work	Award	Result
2011	Jessie J	Best Newcomer	Won
2011	Jessie J	Best Female Artist	Won
2011	"Price Tag"	Best Video	Nominated
2011	"Price Tag"	Best Song	Won

== Glamour Awards ==
Glamour Awards are an awards show held annually in the UK to reward the most successful women in show business. Jessie has received one award nomination.

Year	Nominated work	Award	Result
2011	Jessie J	Woman of Tomorrow	Won
2012	Jessie J	UK Solo Artist	Won
2013	Jessie J	Editors Choice	Won

== Grammy Awards ==
The Grammy Awards are awarded annually by the National Academy of Recording Arts and Sciences of the United States. Jessie J received one nomination.

Year	Nominated work	Award	Result
2015	"Bang Bang" (with Ariana Grande and Nicki Minaj)	Best Pop Duo/Group Performance	Nominated

== IARA Awards ==
Year	Nominated work	Award	Result
2018	Jessie J	Best Female Artist	Nominated

== iHeartRadio Music Awards ==
The iHeartRadio Music Awards is an international music awards show founded by iHeartRadio in 2014.

Year	Nominated work	Award	Result
2015	"Bang Bang" (with Ariana Grande and Nicki Minaj)	Best Collaboration	Won

== Ibiza Music Video Festival ==
Ibiza Music Video Festival is the online music video competition. Rupert Bryan and Elizabeth Fear founded the event in 2013.

Year	Nominee / work	Award	Result
2017	"Can't Take My Eyes Off You"	Best Hair & Make-Up	Won

== International Dance Music Awards ==
The International Dance Music Awards is an awards event held annually in Miami, Florida, and was established in 1985 by Winter Music Conference (WMC) to recognise and honour exceptional achievements.

Year	Nominated work	Award	Result
2015	Best Commercial/Pop Dance Track	"Bang Bang" (with Ariana Grande and Nicki Minaj)	Nominated

== Kids' Choice Awards ==
Year	Nominated work	Award	Result
2015	Best UK act	Jessie J	Nominated
2015	New Artist of The Year	Jessie J	Nominated
2015	Bang Bang (with Ariana Grande and Nicki Minaj)	Song of The Year	Won

== MOBO Awards ==
The MOBO Awards (Music of Black Origin) first held in 1996, are held annually in the United Kingdom to recognise artists of any race or nationality who perform black music and showcase "the world of urban music including R&B, hip-hop, gospel and reggae as a potent force in the cultural worldwide music community". Jessie J has won five awards from six nominations.

Year	Nominated work	Award	Result
2011	Jessie J	Best Newcomer	Won
2011	Jessie J	Best UK Act	Won
2011	Who You Are	Best Album	Won
2011	"Do It Like a Dude"	Best Song	Won
2011	"Do It Like a Dude"	Best Video	Nominated
2012	Jessie J	Best British Female Artist	Won
2013	Jessie J	Best Female Act	Nominated
2014	Jessie J	Best Female Act	Won

== MTV ==
=== MTV Brand New ===
MTV's Brand New are an annual awards by MTV for the very best in new music.

Year	Nominated work	Award	Result
2011	Jessie J	Next Big Thing	Won

- Jessie J came second place.

=== MTV Europe Music Awards ===
The MTV Europe Music Awards were established in 1994 by MTV Europe to celebrate the most popular music videos in Europe.

Year	Nominated work	Award	Result
2011	Jessie J	Best New Act	Nominated
2011	Jessie J	Best Push Act	Nominated
2011	Jessie J	Best UK/Ireland Act	Nominated
2012	Jessie J	Best UK/Ireland Act	Nominated
2017	For the Artists for Grenfell initiative	Power of Music Award	Won

=== MTV Video Music Awards ===
The MTV Video Music Awards The MTV Video Music Awards was established in 1984 by MTV to award the music videos of the year.

Year	Nominated work	Award	Result
2015	"Bang Bang" (featuring Ariana Grande & Nicki Minaj)	Best Collaboration	Nominated

=== MTV Video Play Awards ===
The MTV Video Play Awards are an annual event celebrates the highest video play counts on MTV channels across the globe.

Year	Nominated work	Award	Result
2012	"Price Tag"	2× Platinum	Won

== NewNowNext Awards ==
The NewNowNext Awards are an annual LGBT-awards show, held by Logo.

Year	Nominated work	Award	Result
2012	"Jessie J"	Brink of Fame:Music Artist	Nominated

== NRJ Music Awards ==
The NRJ Music Awards, by the radio station NRJ in partnership with the television network TF1 takes place every year in mid-January at Cannes (PACA, France) as the opening of MIDEM.

Year	Nominated work	Award	Result
2012	Jessie J	New International Artist of The Year	Nominated

== People's Choice Awards ==
Year	Nominated work	Award	Result
2015	Jessie J	Favourite Pop Artist	Nominated
2015	"Bang Bang" (Featuring Ariana Grande & Nicki Minaj)	Favourite Song	Nominated

== Popjustice Twenty Quid Music Prize ==
The Popjustice £20 Music Prize is an annual prize awarded by a panel of judges organised by music website Popjustice to the singer(s) of the best British pop single of the past year.

Year	Nominated work	Award	Result
2011	"Do It Like A Dude"	British Pop Single of the Year	Nominated

== Q Awards ==
The Q Awards are the UK's annual music awards run by the music magazine Q to honour musical excellence. Winners are voted by readers of Q online, with others decided by a judging panel. Jessie has received one award from three nominations.

Year	Nominated work	Award	Result
2011	Jessie J	Best Breakthrough Artist	Nominated
2011	Jessie J	Best Female Artist	Nominated
2011	"Do It Like a Dude"	Best Video	Won

== Silver Clef Awards ==
The Silver Clef Awards is an annual UK music awards lunch, which has been running since 1976.

Year	Nominated work	Award	Result
2012	Jessie J	Royal Albert Hall Best British Act Award	Won

== Sound of... ==
Sound of... is an annual BBC poll of music critics and industry figures to find the most promising new music talent.

Year	Nominated work	Award	Result
2011	Jessie J	Sound of 2011	Won

== Stonewall Awards ==
The Stonewall Awards is an annual event that celebrates the contribution that individuals and organisations make to the lives of lesbian, gay and bisexual people in Britain today. It was first held in 2006.

Year	Nominated work	Award	Result
2011	Jessie J	Entertainer of the Year	Won

== UK Festival Awards ==
The UK Festival Awards are an award show that recognises the best music festivals in the UK. Jessie has received two nominations in 2011.

Year	Nominated work	Award	Result
2011	Jessie J	Best Newcomer	Won
2011	"Price Tag"	Summer Song	Won

== UK Music Video Awards ==
The UK Music Video Awards are the British version of the MTV Video Music Awards. Jessie has received 6 nominations.

Year	Nominated work	Award	Result
2011	Live in London	Best Live Music Coverage	Nominated
2011	"Do It Like a Dude"	Best Cinematography	Nominated
2011	"Do It Like a Dude"	Best Pop Video - UK	Nominated
2012	"Domino"	Choosing People	Nominated
2013	"Wild"	Best Editing	Nominated
2013	"Wild"	Best Pop Video - UK	Nominated

== Urban Music Awards ==
The Urban Music Awards is a British awards ceremony launched in 2003 to recognise the achievement of urban-based artists, producers, nightclubs, DJs, radio stations, and record labels. Jessie J has received one award from four nominations.

Year	Nominated work	Award	Result
2011	Who You Are	Best Single	Nominated
2011	Nobody's Perfect	Best Single	Won
2011	Jessie J	Artist of the Year	Won
2011	Jessie J	Best Female Artist	Won

== World Music Awards ==
The World Music Awards is an international awards show founded in 1989 that honours recording artists based on their worldwide sales figures, which are provided by the International Federation of the Phonographic Industry.

Year	Nominated work	Award	Result
2014	Jessie J	World's Best Entertainer	Nominated
2014	Jessie J	World's Best Female Artist	Nominated
2014	Jessie J	World's Best Live Act	Nominated
2014	Alive	World's Best Album	Nominated
2014	Thunder	World's Best Video	Nominated
2014	Thunder	World's Best Song	Nominated
2014	"Wild" (featuring Big Sean and Dizzee Rascal)	World's Best Video	Nominated
2014	"Wild" (featuring Big Sean and Dizzee Rascal)	World's Best Song	Nominated
