= Nickelodeon Australian Kids' Choice Awards 2011 =

2011 Nickelodeon Australian Kids' Choice Awards
- Date: 7 October 2011
- Location: Sydney Entertainment Centre
- Hosted by: Jennette McCurdy and Nathan Kress

Television/radio coverage
- Network: Nickelodeon

The 9th annual Nickelodeon Australian Kids' Choice Awards was held on Friday 7 October 2011 at the Sydney Entertainment Centre. The show was hosted by Jennette McCurdy and Nathan Kress, known for starring in the hit Nickelodeon teen sitcom iCarly. It was the final installment of the Kids' Choice Awards in Australia before being replaced by Nickelodeon Slimefest in 2012.

== Winners and nominees ==
=== People ===
Award	Runners-up	Winner
Hall of Slime	Rove McManus	Bindi and Robert Irwin
Hall of Slime	Natalie Bassingthwaighte	Bindi and Robert Irwin
Hall of Slime	Guy Sebastian	Bindi and Robert Irwin
Awesome Oldie	Karl Stefanovic	Matt Preston
Awesome Oldie	David 'Kochie' Koch	Matt Preston
Awesome Oldie	Kerri-Anne Kennerley	Matt Preston
Baddest Baddie	Megatron	Kyle Sandilands
Baddest Baddie	CM Punk	Kyle Sandilands
Baddest Baddie	Sue Sylvester	Kyle Sandilands
Slime Minister	Tony Abbott	Julia Gillard
Super Fresh Award	Samara Weaving	Cody Simpson
Super Fresh Award	Willow Smith	Cody Simpson
Super Fresh Award	Victoria Justice	Cody Simpson
Get Real Award	Camp Orange	Australia's Got Talent
Get Real Award	The X Factor	Australia's Got Talent
Get Real Award	MasterChef Australia	Australia's Got Talent

=== Music ===
Fresh Aussie Musos

Fave Aussie Musos

- Jessica Mauboy
- Cody Simpson Winner
- Justice Crew
- Jack Vidgen

Fave International Artist

- Lady GaGa
- Willow Smith
- Bruno Mars
- Katy Perry Winner

Fave Song

- Party Rock Anthem – LMFAO Winner
- Price Tag – Jessie J
- Loud – Stan Walker
- Whip My Hair – Willow Smith

=== TV ===
Fave TV Show

- Big Time Rush
- iCarly
- Wizards of Waverly Place Winner
- Victorious
- Home and Away

Fave TV Star

- Miranda Cosgrove
- Selena Gomez Winner
- Victoria Justice

Fave Reality Show

Top Toon

- SpongeBob SquarePants Winner
- Phineas and Ferb
- The Simpsons
- The Penguins of Madagascar

=== People ===
The LOL Award

- Luke and Wyatt
- Hamish and Andy
- Jennette McCurdy Winner
- Josh Thomas

Cutest Couple

Hottest Hottie

- Samantha Harris
- Samara Weaving
- Victoria Justice Winner
- Lara Bingle

Hottest Guy Hotties

- Justin Bieber Winner
- Taylor Lautner
- David Jones-Roberts
- Big Time Rush

Awesome Aussie

- Chris Hemsworth
- Rove
- Jennifer Hawkins
- Cody Simpson Winner

Platinum Achievement Award

Big Kid Award

=== Movies ===
Fave Movie

- Cars 2
- Harry Potter and the Deathly Hallows – Part 2 Winner
- Rango
- Kung Fu Panda 2

Favourite Movie Star

Fave Kiss
