= Comedy Slapdown =

Australian television program

- Presented by: H.G. Nelson
- Starring: Rebecca De Unamuno; Steven Gates; Corinne Grant; Tom Gleeson; Julia Zemiro; Matt Tilley; Russell Fletcher; Damian Callinan; Dave Callan; Natalie Garonzi; Julia Morris; Cameron Knight
- Narrated by: "Rowdy Ronnie" McNitro
- Country of origin: Australia
- Original language: English
- No. of seasons: 1
- No. of episodes: 12

Production
- Executive producers: Jason Stephens; Darren Chau (the Comedy Channel)
- Producer: Michael Pope
- Running time: 60 mins (Inc. Commercials)

Original release
- Network: The Comedy Channel
- Release: 8 November – 27 December 2008

Comedy Slapdown is an Australian television improvised comedy program produced by FremantleMedia, that first aired on The Comedy Channel from 8 November 2008 at 7:30pm. The show is hosted by H.G. Nelson and features a variety of comedians participating in theatresports Matt Parkinson heads up the judging panel which includes one other celebrity judge and one judge selected from the audience. Notable guest comedians include Corinne Grant, Tom Gleeson, Natalie Garonzi, Matt Tilley and Julia Zemiro.

The premise of the show can be compared to the popular improvisational comedy program 'Whose Line Is It Anyway?' with various improvisational comedy games played as the teams compete against each other.

== Game Examples ==
In each episode, the contestants are split into 2 teams, the red team and the blue team (Referring to the terms "In the red corner" and "In the blue corner") Here some of the games that are played

- What's My Name? – A standard Comedy Slapdown opening round. The game involves both teams. One member of each team is a bouncer and holds a clipboard. Names of celebrities will appear on the screen behind them and the other players must, one at a time, do an impression of that person and help their teammate guess who they are.
- Off The Cuff – This game involves one member of each team. One person is given something to make a speech about, and at random times, the other player will say a word and the player giving the speech must incorporate that word into their speech.
- Don't Diss Me! – This game also involves one member of each team. They are each given a microphone and they will take turns rapping insults based on the pictures that appear on the screen. EG: with an hourglass: "Hey, boy! You got no class, 'cos, You just tippin' through an hourglass!"
- What's This Do? – Works exactly the same way as 'Props' On 'Whose line is it anyway?'. Each team is given a weird-looking prop and they will go back and forth, thinking of as many funny ideas as possible using the props.
- They said What? – One at a time, a player from either team will deliver the words you would never want to hear in a given situation (E.g.; In a taxi, In bed with someone, at the oscars). There are two topics for the players to make statements on. The second topic usually relates to the occupation of the guest judge (E.g.; At a singing competition for Anthony Callea, at a Brownlow medal dinner for Jason Akermanis)
- Break Into Song – For one of the 2 teams. They will act out a given scenario, but when the musician, John Thorn, starts playing music they must start singing their dialogue and keep singing until the music stops.
- Celebrity Serenade – Comedy Slapdown's weekly final challenge. The guest judge of the week will sit in a chair on stage and HG will ask them a few personal questions. Each of the 6 players must then sing a song about the guest, incorporating the info from the questions.

== List of teams ==
=== The Squirminators (Winner, 2008) ===
- Paul McCarthy
- Natalie Garonzi
- Damian Callinan

=== Nuclear Storm (Runner-up, 2008) ===
- Lliam Amor
- Emily Taheny
- Russell Fletcher

=== The Trio of Doom ===
- Tom Gleeson
- Rebecca De Unamuno
- Cameron Knight (stood in for Russell Fletcher for one episode)

=== Hardcore Nitro ===
- Matt Tilley
- Corinne Grant
- Stephen Hall

=== The Dirty Hombres ===
- Rik Brown
- Julia Zemiro (stood in for Julia Morris for two episodes)
- Steven Gates
