= Guerrilla Gardeners =

- Presented by: Dave Lawson
- Country of origin: Australia
- Original language: English
- No. of seasons: 1
- No. of episodes: 13

Production
- Producer: Nick Murray
- Running time: 30 minutes (including commercials)

Original release
- Network: Network Ten
- Release: 18 February 2009 – 27 July 2011

Guerrilla Gardeners is an Australian television show that was broadcast on Network Ten. The show takes its name and basic premise from the guerrilla gardening environmental movement. Premiering on 18 February 2009, it was axed in April 2009 due to struggling viewership figures and an unsuccessful timeslot change, with a number of episodes still to be aired but was picked up by Network Ten's digital channel One on 26 July 2011. The show caused controversy due to the activities portrayed in the program.

== Overview ==
The show involves a group of six "guerrilla gardeners" attempting to covertly beautify urban eyesores such as abandoned lots or bleak public spaces without being caught by the authorities. Five of the guerrilla gardeners are experienced in landscape and horticulture, while sixth member and host Dave Lawson was hired primarily for his ability to "spin lies to the councils when they turned up".

== Controversy ==
The gardeners' work is done without seeking consent from the owners of the land, and is often completed through subterfuge and by defying trespass laws. Because of this, a finished Guerrilla Gardeners project was threatened with removal by Marrickville Council, while a project in Sutherland Shire was halted halfway through construction due to council interference, with the unfinished plantings later removed. The producers were also issued with a fine by the council, which they challenged. Ten also accused Canterbury Council of preparing to destroy work featured in the series' first episode, though these claims were later found to be premature and incorrect.

Sutherland Shire asserted that its removal of a Guerrilla Gardeners project was due to factors such as the team's failure to take into account soil quality, and the unauthorised installation of plants and decorations which might create a distraction for motorists. The council also claimed that the gardeners failed to comply with traffic and workplace safety rules during construction. Producers of the show have stated that they will respect any council decisions regarding what becomes of their work.

== Episodes ==
No.	Title	Original release date	Ratings (Note: Overall national viewers, numbers in brackets indicate nightly ratings position.)
1	"Canterbury"	18 February 2009	687,000 (—)
2	"Cleveland Street"	25 February 2009	712,000 (—)
3	"St Kilda"	4 March 2009	702,000 (24th)
4	"Annandale"	11 March 2009	685,000 (23rd)
5	"Newtown"	18 March 2009	766,000 (22nd)
6	"Jannali"	25 March 2009	750,000 (20th)
7	"Randwick"	1 April 2009	731,000 (21st)
8	"Balmain"	8 April 2009	800,000 (20th)
9	"Ashfield"	15 April 2009	755,000 (21st)
10	"Woolloomooloo"	19 April 2009	396,000 (27th)
11	"St Peters"	26 April 2009	436,000 (27th)
12	"Parramatta"	26 July 2011 (One)	–
13	"Manly Vale"	27 July 2011 (One)	–

== See also ==
- List of programs broadcast by Network 10
- List of Australian television series
