= Nickelodeon (New Zealand TV channel) =

Nickelodeon New Zealand
- Broadcast area: New Zealand; Fiji
- Headquarters: Auckland, New Zealand

Programming
- Languages: English; Māori
- Picture format: 576i (SDTV 4:3)

History
- Launched: 1 August 2006; 20 years ago
- Replaced: Nickelodeon Asia (in New Zealand)
- Closed: 30 November 2010; 15 years ago
- Replaced by: Nickelodeon Australia and New Zealand

Nickelodeon was a television channel in New Zealand that targeted audiences aged 3–14. The channel launched on 1 August 2006 and was available on Sky Television channel 41, replacing Nickelodeon Asia. The channel closed on 30 November 2010, and New Zealand schedule is now managed by Nickelodeon Australia. The channel used to be headquartered in Auckland, New Zealand, shared with fellow Viacom channel MTV New Zealand.

== History ==
=== Background ===
The Southeast Asian version of Nickelodeon (broadcast from Singapore) was made available to the viewers on Sky Digital and UHF in New Zealand in January 2000. The channel was available on the basic package for all digital subscribers. In 2002, it was added to TelstraClear's cable service.

The channel was placed as the most violent in an early 2004 Auckland University of Technology report on violence in children's programming, with thirteen violent instances in a sampled hour.

=== Launch ===
Viacom announced in May 2006 that it would launch a localised Nickelodeon channel from 1 August that year, replacing Nick Asia. The move came alongside the announcement of the launch of a localised MTV channel for 19 August. Both channels were based at the newly-launched MTV Networks office in Auckland.

=== Operation ===
The channel broadcast for 24 hours a day. Nick Jr. was a block on the channel, broadcasting from 9:30am to 2pm from Monday to Wednesday, 9:30am to 2:30pm on Thursday and Friday and 6:30 to 8am on weekends.

In July 2007, it held a talent competition, Nick Rocks. Local programming as of that year consisted solely of "small segments" and that the channel wanted a more local approach. In November of that year, New Zealand On Air announced the possibility of lifting its ban on taxpayer funding for Sky TV channels, including Nickelodeon. The existing funding policy stipulated that funding only reached free-to-air channels with a reach of 90% or more of the total population, whereas Nickelodeon was carried on Sky's basic package (of 700,000 subscribers) and was exempt from the rule. In October 2008, MTV Networks ANZ managing director Dave Sibley refused a comment from The New Zealand Herald reporter John Drinnan regarding the possibility of local content.

For Māori Language Week 2009, the channel aired a five-episode pilot dub of SpongeBob SquarePants, dubbed at Cinco Cine Film Production. These episodes were repeated in the same period in 2010.

=== Closure ===
According to the NZPA, MTV Networks New Zealand (which consists of Nickelodeon, MTV and Comedy Central) announced in September 2010 that it would close its New Zealand offices from 1 December 2010, with the networks' portfolio continuing to run from the MTV Networks Australia's Sydney offices. This meant that Viacom's television channel operations in New Zealand were to be overseen from Australia, with both Nick Jr. and MTV Classic announced to launch in New Zealand.

On 1 December 2010, the Australian version of Nickelodeon replaced the New Zealand version. On the same day, Nick Jr. launched on the platform.

== Logo history ==
2006–2010

2006–2008

2010

== See also ==
- MTV New Zealand
