= Maude Garrett =

Australian broadcaster

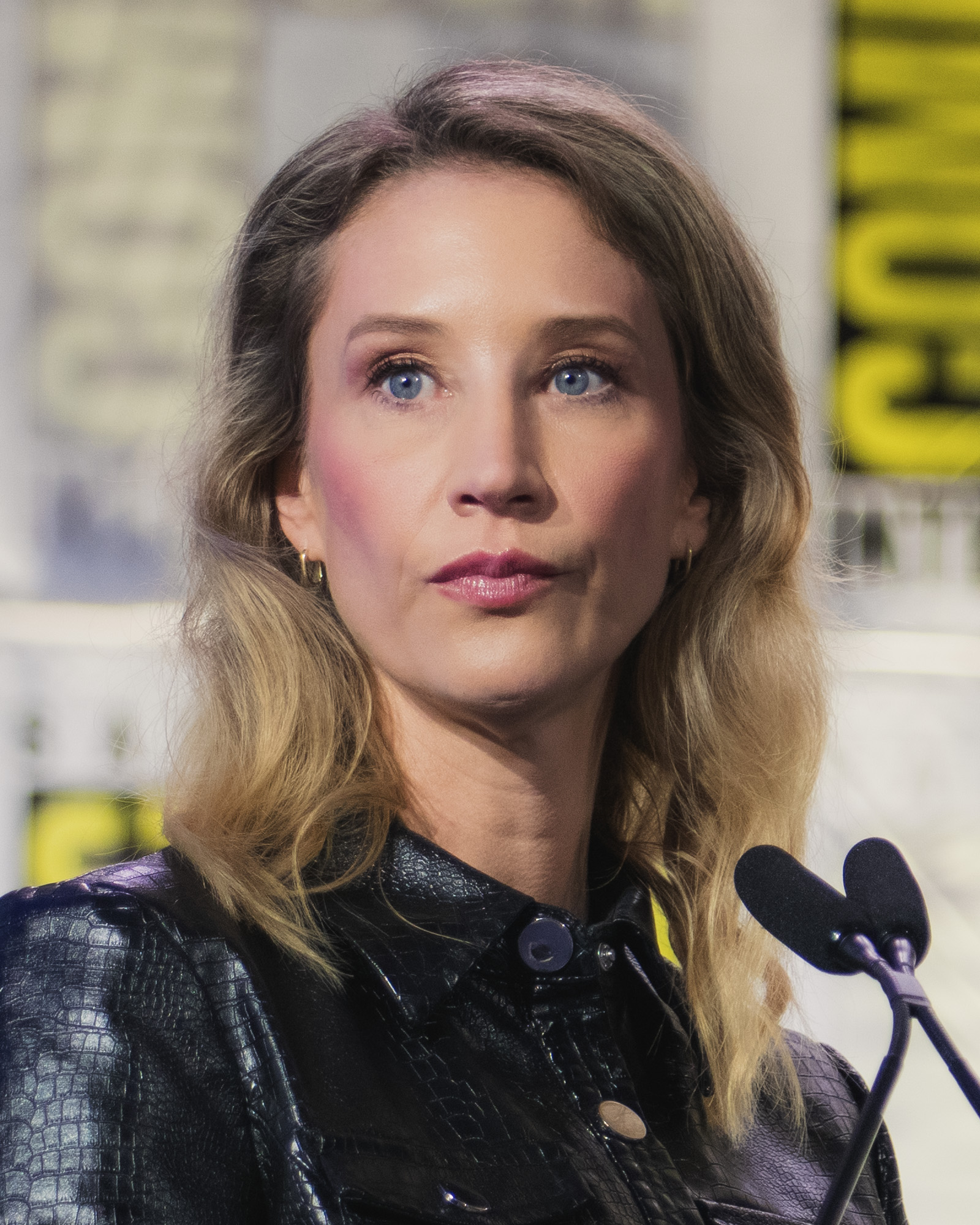
- Garrett in 2026
- Born: Darwin, Northern Territory, Australia
- Occupation: Television personality
- Years active: 2008–present
- Relatives: Peter Garrett (uncle)
- Website: maudegarrett.com

Maude Garrett is an Australian radio and television personality living and working in Los Angeles. She is currently the Entertainment Correspondent for The Project. doing studio crosses live from Los Angeles. She is known for her on air work with brands including BBC America, Quibi, Facebook, Nerdist News, Red Bull, Nickelodeon, SourceFed, 2Day FM, The Project, NBCUniversal, Southern Star, Syfy, Rotten Tomatoes, One Network, Discovery Channel, Digital Trends, New Rockstars, and AMC Theatres.

== Early life ==
Garrett was born in Darwin, Northern Territory and grew up in Brisbane. Garrett is the niece of Peter Garrett, politician and vocalist with the rock band Midnight Oil.

== Career ==
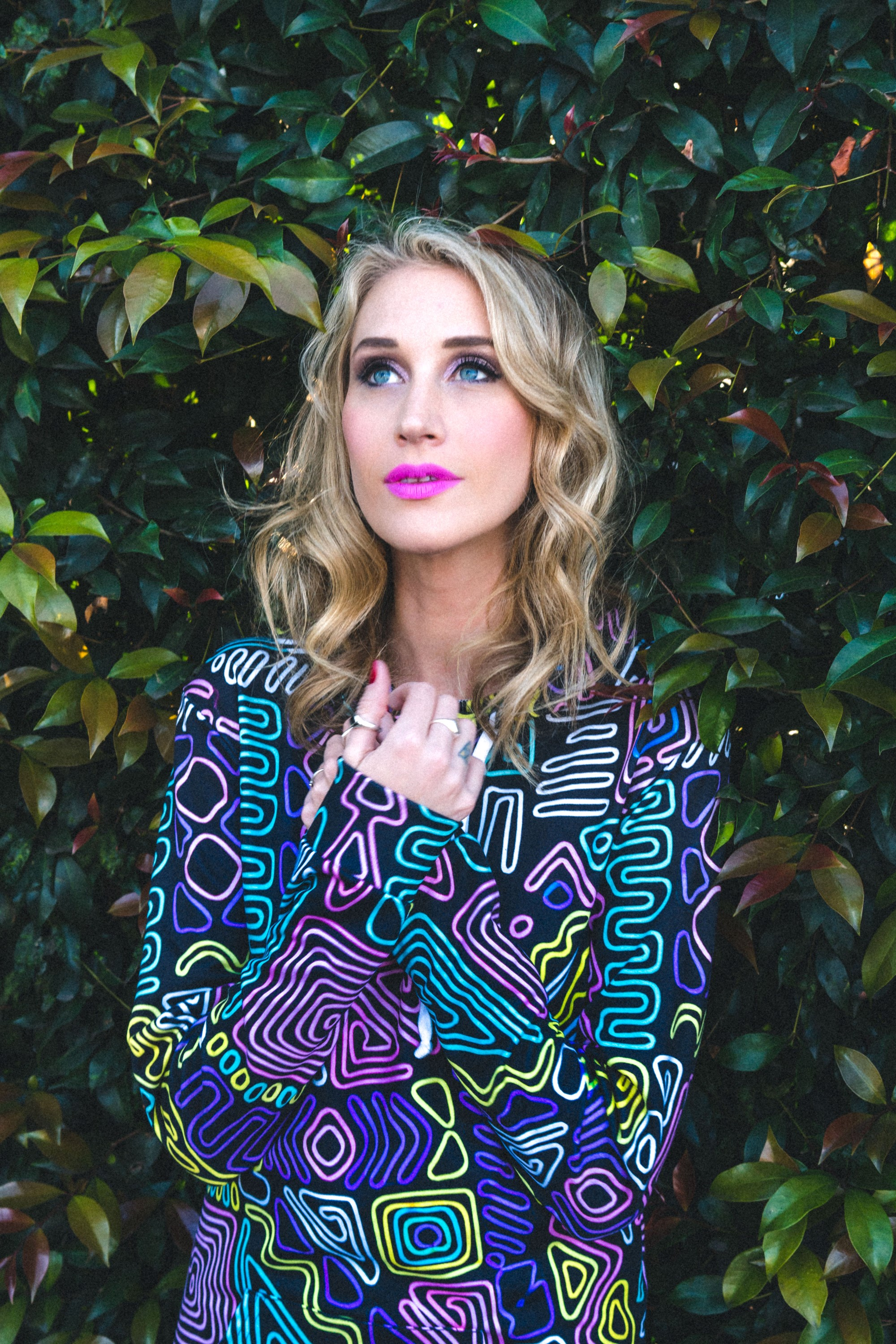
Maude Garrett in WHUT Neon Dream Hoodie Dress (2018)

She was a co-host on Nickelodeon Australia, where she presented the popular kids' afternoon show Sarvo, and hosted reality show Camp Orange four times. In October 2009 Garrett hosted the Southern Star television program The Pursuit, a "branded entertainment" game show on the Nine Network.

Garrett joined 2Day FM, presenting the latest celebrity gossip on The Dirt. Since February 2011, she co-hosted with Matt Acton, the national nightly show The Hot30 Countdown with Matty and Maude. From May to June 2011, and since October 2011, Garrett has co-hosted a gaming television series on One called Save Point, discussing video game releases and gaming news. On 31 January 2012, Garrett announced on the radio show that she is leaving the Hot30 Countdown on 10 February 2012.

In 2012, Garrett founded the publishing platform Geek Bomb showcasing trends in geek culture. Celebrities interviewed on the platform include Keanu Reeves, Taraji P. Henson, Leonardo DiCaprio, Charlize Theron, Will Ferrell, Jennifer Garner and Jim Carrey. On 1 December 2022, Geek Bomb announced their rebrand to Maude's Book Club.

In January 2013, she relocated to Los Angeles to host The Hot Hits Live from LA alongside KIIS radio host Dave Styles.

In May 2015, Garrett became a host on SourceFed Nerd, a nerd culture-focused spinoff of the YouTube news channel SourceFed. In August 2016, Garrett announced her departure from the YouTube channel.

In January 2019, Garrett replaced Alex Albrecht as a host on the Half Hour Happy Hour podcast. In 2020, she hosted the Rotten Tomatoes show Watch List on Quibi.

In January 2023, she rebranded her company to focus on her show, Maude's Book Club.

== Panelist and appearances ==
Garrett was a panelist for New York Comic Con and Los Angeles Comic Con. She was a contestant on Syfy's The Great Debate. Starting 2019 she was a cast member, playing Elloway alongside Freddie Prinze Jr. for Galaxy of Crime on Gegghead. On 18 July 2011, Garrett appeared as a guest on the Ten Network panel discussion show Can of Worms, along with comedian Fiona O'Loughlin and businessman John Elliott. On 19 October 2010, Garrett was a guest on a special sci-fi themed edition of the Ten Network television show Talkin' 'Bout Your Generation where, dressed as a Na'vi from Avatar, she competed with series regular Josh Thomas. She was a Celebrity Judge for the Nickelodeon Australian Kids' Choice Awards in 2006, and co-hosted the Orange Carpet opening of the Awards in 2007 and 2008.

An article in the Sydney Confidential section of The Daily Telegraph on 20 May 2010 discussed Garrett's practice of "photo-bombing". In May 2011 Garrett took part in a photo shoot for Australian FHM's Sexiest 100. An article in The Sunday Telegraph in August 2011 revealed how the photo shoot helped Garrett to "come out of her shell".

== Events covered ==
In her roles with BBC America, AMC Theatres, The Hot Hits Live from LA, and The Project, she has worked on red carpet events including the BAFTA Awards and junkets including The Hobbit: The Battle of the Five Armies, Avengers: Age of Ultron, Insurgent, A Wrinkle in Time, Second Act, Wonder Woman, Logan, and Dunkirk.

== Awards ==
In 2007, Garrett accepted the awards on stage for Most Outstanding Children's Program and Most Outstanding Event at the ASTRA Awards which were won for Camp Orange: The Mystery of Spaghetti Creek and the Nickelodeon Australian Kids Choice Awards 07. She was nominated for the Favourite Female Personality in the 2009 ASTRA Awards. In 2021 Maudie was on the Prime Time Emmy ballot for her work on the NBC-produced show, "The Watchlist"

== Brand partnerships and ambassadorships ==
Maude has worked with brands including Nike, Xbox, Red Bull, Samsung, Acura, Amazon Prime Video, Baby Ruth, Paramount Pictures, Kellogg's, Nintendo, Huawei, Lipton Acura, Amazon Tim Tam, Budlight Super Bowl, DC, Uber Eats, Samsung, Baby Ruth, Alienware, RAZER, AMC, Los Angeles Kings, Logitech, and EA Sports resulting in millions in partnership deals.

Media offices
Preceded by Dave Lawson	Camp Orange; Host; 2006–2009	Succeeded by Luke & Wyatt
Preceded by James Kerley and Dave Lawson	Sarvo; Co-host (with Kyle Linahan); 2007	Succeeded by Program ended
