= Sarvo =

- The Sarvo logo used during 2007 and 2008.
- Presented by: Jamie Croft (2002–2003); Josh Quong Tart (2002–2003); Tony Brockman (2003–2005); James Kerley (2003–2007); Dave Lawson (2006–2007); Maude Garrett (2007–2008); Kyle Linahan (2007–2008)
- Country of origin: Australia
- Original language: English
- No. of seasons: 5

Production
- Running time: 120 minutes

Original release
- Network: Nickelodeon; Nickelodeon (New Zealand)
- Release: 2002 – 2008

Sarvo was an after-school show for kids on Nickelodeon (New Zealand) and Nickelodeon (Australia), it was hosted by Maude Garrett and Kyle Linahan, until it was cancelled in 2008. It acted as a wrapper program (a show which features other shows within it) to the most popular programs on Nickelodeon.

== Presenters ==
- Original: Jamie Croft and Josh Quong Tart
- 2003 – July 2005: Tony Brockman and James Kerley
- July 2005 – 23 February 2007: James Kerley and Dave Lawson
- 9 April 2007 – 2008: Maude Garrett and Kyle Linahan
- "Bootsy" the Chihuahua

Note: During the transition from James and Tony to James and Dave, there was a one-week-long hiatus; however, during the transition from James and Dave to Maude and Kyle, there was approximately a one and a half months-long hiatus. Also, the 2007 version of the show is the first time that there has been a female host on the show and the 2007 version shows the second time that a Camp Orange host has moved on to host Sarvo, the first being Dave and now Maude.

== Sarvo Rewind ==
Sarvo Rewind was a best-of version screened at 3pm on Saturday afternoons and was a wrap-up of the week's events on Sarvo. As of 9 April 2007, (the premiere date of the "all new Sarvo") there are no plans to continue Sarvo Rewind.

== Show segments ==
Genie in a Beanie – Maude and Kyle make viewers' sent-in wishes come true (e.g. "make my bed in the morning" or "replace my school teacher").

Dare-Off – Viewers send in dares and decide who should do the dare (Kyle or Maude). This segment is based on the most popular segment from the previous seasons (pre-2007), Sarvo Suggestion Sack. Examples of this included going into the Queen Victoria Building dressed up as angry grandmothers.

Sarvo Show-Offs – Throughout the years, various Sarvo Show-offs were conducted. The first one involved viewers making their own version of the SpongeBob SquarePants theme song. There is usually a prize, the first one being Orange Carpet tickets and the opportunity to perform at the pre-show of the 2007 Nickelodeon Australian Kids' Choice Awards.

Sarvo Inbox – Maude and Kyle read out letters sent in by viewers of the show.

My Pet Rocks – Viewers send in photos and stories of their pets that are shown on screen during the segment on Sarvo.

Webhead of the Week – The 'Webhead of the Week' gets the opportunity to talk to Maude and Kyle live via webcam.

Clickhead of the Week – A popular feature on the Nickelodeon website, 'Clickheads' are animated cartoons created online by members of the website. Random 'Clickheads' are then shown on Nick in between ad-breaks. The 'Clickhead of the Week' receives a 'special playing' during Sarvo, and receives a prize pack.

Nicker Ticker – Another popular feature on the Nickelodeon website, Nicker Ticker, involves short messages sent online via the website being played as a 'ticker' on Sarvo.

Sarvo Extras – Like the extras on a DVD, Sarvo Extras offers kids an inside look at the making of various Nickelodeon shows.

== Image gallery ==
The original Sarvo logo.

The current Sarvo logo, used from early 2007.

Note: Despite the logo not showing the apostrophe before Sarvo from 2003 onwards, the show was officially referred to as 'Sarvo until early 2007.

== See also ==
- sn:tv
