= James Kerley =

Australian television presenter

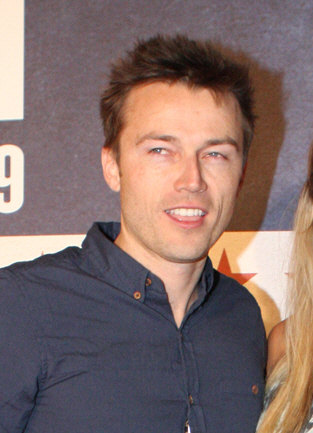
James Kerley in Sydney for 'The Campaign' red carpet event at Fox Studios, in August 2012

James Kerley is an Australian TV presenter and radio presenter.

== Career ==
Kerley was a co-host on the Nickelodeon kids’ show Sarvo between 2004 and February 2007, alongside Tony Brockman and in his first year won the Sarvote kids’ choice award for favourite new host. During his time with Nickelodeon, Kerley co-hosted the 2004, 2005 and 2006 Nickelodeon Australian Kids' Choice Awards alongside Tony Brockman, Dave Lawson, Jesse McCartney and Sophie Monk. He also presented the award for the Biggest Greenie at the Nickelodeon Australian Kids' Choice Awards 2007.

Kerley moved to Australian subscription TV music channel, Channel [V] in 2007 where he co-hosted the video request show whatUwant and hosted music trivia show Cash Cab for two seasons. Kerley also created and co-hosted The Dave & Kerley Show alongside former Sarvo co-host Dave Lawson as well as naming and co-creating travel format B430.

In 2008, Kerley hosted Taken Out, a dating show on Network Ten. The show featured 30 female contestants who eliminate themselves from contention to date a single male contestant as facts about him are revealed over three rounds. The man can then select a winner from the remaining women to go on a date with him. The show was axed after 19 episodes after receiving mediocre ratings. In 2009 all the episodes produced were screened on Channel [V] and have since been repeated.

In November 2008, Kerley and Maz Compton signed on with Nova 96.9 Sydney presenting the Nova Top 10 from 6pm until 9.30pm Monday to Friday. In November 2009, Kerley joined Michelle Anderson and Kent 'Smallzy' Small to host a National Nova Top Ten program each weeknight, the show was axed in November 2010.

Kerley was a Dawes Point presenter on Network Ten's live 2008–09, Sydney New Year's Eve coverage alongside Fuzzy.

In 2011 he was a part of the show Balls of Steel Australia, hosting fake game shows where victims are subjected to unfair disadvantages and uncomfortable situations. He also co-hosted Uplate on Go! Channel.

He became an author in 2012 when he released a book titled 'The Man Plan'. The book is a self-proclaimed 'modern man's guide to getting your shit together'.

In 2014 James became host of One HD's Maxim TV with Lana Kington based on the popular men's magazine.

As of April 2018, James has been the host of the live mobile trivia game show, Cash Show Australia.

Media offices
Preceded by Jamie Croft and Josh Quong Tart	Sarvo co-host 2003 – 23 February 2007 with Tony Brockman (2003–05) and Dave Lawson (2005–07)	Succeeded by Maude Garrett and Kyle Linahan
