= Dave Lawson =

Australian comedian

David Alexander Webster Lawson (born 25 September 1978) is an Australian actor and TV personality.

== Early life and education ==
Lawson grew up in the Bayside area of Melbourne, Victoria and completed his secondary education at Haileybury College. He studied advertising and marketing at the Royal Melbourne Institute of Technology.

Lawson's first job, as a ten year old, was selling The Herald newspaper in the late 80’s. Later, he delivered pamphlets, worked at a hippy incense store, and dressed-up as Willy the Wizard for children’s parties. He also ran a lawn mowing business that shut down after he "mowed off [his] father's sprinkler heads." While his parents wanted him to pursue a more traditional career path, they were supportive of his interest in becoming an actor. His father encouraged him to "give [acting] a go for a bit" while granting himself "a cut off time."

== Career ==
In college, Lawson's friend's mother, who was a casting agent, helped him secure several television commercials for Dr. Pepper and Kmart. He was later approached by Nickelodeon Australia about hosting Saturday Nick Television. He ended up working with the network for several years, hosting Nick Takes Over Your School (1998), Sarvo (2002) and Camp Orange (2005). He also co-hosted the 2006 Nickelodeon Australian Kids' Choice Awards with fellow Sarvo host James Kerley and Sophie Monk.

Lawson had cameo appearances in Neighbours (1999–present) and Blue Heelers (1999–2006), John Safran’s Music Jamboree (2002) and Last Man Standing (2005). He also starred in Peter Grayson's film Lucky Day (2002), as well as in Nick Ball and Gus Johnston's comedy short How Much Do You Love Me? (2008). In 2001, Jolyon Watkins, with whom Lawson had previously worked with, asked the actor to appear in a music video that he was directing for Gerling's "Dust Me Selecta". Lawson was paid $400 for his appearance. He is also featured in the music videos for Alex Lloyd's "Green" (2003) and Duncan James's "Speed of Life" (2003).

After leaving Nickelodeon Australia in 2007, Lawson began co-hosting The Dave & Kerley Show with James Kerley in April 2008; the Channel V show aired on Sunday mornings. He also hosted and participated in the Ten Network's Guerrilla Gardeners, in which, because of his experience, he was hired primarily "to spin lines to the councils [attempting to stop the show] when they turned up".

Since 2003, Lawson has appeared in series of Toyota-Australian Football League (AFL) television commercials with fellow comedian Stephen Curry, recreating "legendary moments" from the AFL's history including Michael Long's "flying run" around the Melbourne Cricket Ground in the 1993 Grand Final between Essendon and Carlton. The commercials aired every AFL season, immortalizing retired football personalities such as Leo Barry, Peter Hudson, Alex Jesaulenko, Malcolm Bright and Dermott Brereton.

Lawson appeared on ABC's It's a Date (2013) along with Poh Ling Yeow, and Utopia (2014–2023).

He is the creator, writer, and host of his own digital talk show called Dave’s Shed Show for which he interviews celebrity guests in his backyard with musical director Mark Wilson and hand puppet Wormie (Stephen Curry).

== Personal life ==
In February 2021, Lawson married actor Sarah Snook in a private ceremony in Brooklyn, New York. The couple first met in 2014 and started dating in 2020 after being quarantined together during the COVID-19 pandemic. They welcomed a daughter in May 2023. Lawson also has a son from a previous relationship.

== Filmography ==
=== Film ===
Year	Title	Role	Notes
2002	Lucky Day	Reese	
2010	I Love You Too	Restaurant Waiter	
2014	The Mule	Cheeky Graeme	
2014	The Heckler	Andy	
2015	Oddball	Sergeant Gosch	
2018	Peter Rabbit	Chris	
2021	Peter Rabbit 2: The Runaway	Chris	

=== Television ===
Year	Title	Role	Notes
1999, 2003	Blue Heelers	Cory Fisher / Hamish Scott	2 episodes
2002	John Safran's Music Jamboree	John	Episode #1.8
2005	Last Man Standing	Dickwood	Episode #1.20
2010	Sleuth 101	Steve	Episode: "Family Assorted"
2011	The Match Committee	Skipper	Episode: "Come in Skipper"
2012	Howzat! Kerry Packer's War	Alan Shiell	2 episodes
2012	Lowdown	Dave (Fan)	Episode: "Ben Behaving Badly"
2013	It's a Date	Patrick	Episode: "When Should You Abandon a Date?"
2014	INXS: Never Tear Us Apart	Cary Grant	2 episodes
2014	The Time of Our Lives	Julian	3 episodes
2014–2023	Utopia	Scott	32 episodes
2016	Luke Warm Sex	Herpes	Episode: "How Do I Prepare My Body for Sex?"
2016	The Caravan	Leroy	7 episodes
2016	Bruce	Garry	7 episodes
2017	Newton's Law	Adam Steadman	Episode: "Equal and Opposite Forces"
2017	St Francis	Leroy	5 episodes
2017, 2018	True Story with Hamish & Andy	Alan / Stu	2 episodes
2019	Ms Fisher's Modern Murder Mysteries	Freddy Miles	Episode: "Dead Beat"
2019	Get Krack!n	Tommy	Episode #2.6
2019	The Inbestigators	Cole	Episode: "The Case of the Freaky Frequency"
2020	Mustangs FC	Deano	3 episodes
2021	Why Are You Like This	Gavin	Episode: "The Pressures of Late Capitalism"
2021	Fraud Festival	Luke Kennedy	Television film
2021	Wentworth	Frazer	Episodes: "One Eye Open", "The Reckoning", "Legacy"
2022	The Accidental Wolf		1 episode
2023	The Newsreader	Trevor Lehmann	1 episode
