= Kyle Linahan =

Australian musician and TV presenter

Kyle Linahan is an Australian musician and TV presenter.

Linahan was discovered while starring in the lead role of a Marist College production of The Story of Motown at the age of 14. He was signed to Warner Music at the age of 16 and spent the next couple of years preparing his debut record.

His first single "Beautiful Woman" was released in November 2004 and peaked at number 34 on the ARIA Charts. It features the chorus from the Dr. Hook hit "When You're in Love with a Beautiful Woman".

His second single "Turn It Up", was released in May 2005 and peaked at number 52 on the ARIA Charts.

After breaking into the music industry, Linahan then went on to become the host of popular kids' program Sarvo on Nickelodeon Australia, where he co-hosted the channel for two years with Maude Garrett.

In May 2009, he moved into the next phase of his presenting career with a role at music channel, Channel [V].

== Discography ==
=== Singles ===
List of singles, with selected chart positions
Title	Year	Peak chart positions
Title	Year	AUS
"Beautiful Woman"	2004	34
"Turn It Up"	2005	53
