= Nickelodeon (Australia and New Zealand) =

Former Children's pay television channel in Australia and New Zealand

Nickelodeon Australia & New Zealand
- Final logo used from August 1, 2023 to December 2, 2025. (Note: The logo's wordmark has been in use from 2010-2025. Additionally, this logo is a variant meant to be used for white backgrounds; the main variant has a white wordmark in conjunction with a fully orange splat.)
- Country: Australia; New Zealand
- Broadcast area: Australia; New Zealand; Fiji

Programming
- Languages: English; Māori
- Picture format: 576i (SDTV 16:9)

Ownership
- Owner: Paramount Networks UK & Australia
- Parent: Nickelodeon Group
- Sister channels: Comedy Central; MTV; Club MTV; MTV 80s MTV Hits; Nick Jr. NickMusic

History
- Launched: 23 October 1995; 31 years ago (Australia); 1 December 2010; 15 years ago (New Zealand and Fiji)
- Replaced: Max/Classic Max (Australia; Foxtel); Nickelodeon NZ (in New Zealand)
- Closed: 1 August 2023; 3 years ago (Foxtel); 1 November 2025; 11 months ago (Australia); 2 December 2025; 10 months ago (New Zealand)
- Replaced by: Australia: Nickelodeon (free-to-air) and Paramount+ (programming); New Zealand: Sky Kids (programming)

Links
- Website: nick.com.au

Availability

Terrestrial
- Foxtel (Australia): Channel 701
- Fetch TV (Australia): Channel 252
- Sky Television (NZ): Channel 101

Streaming media
- Sky Go (NZ): skygo.co.nz

Nickelodeon was an Australian and New Zealand children's pay television channel owned by Paramount Networks UK & Australia. It was based on the namesake American television channel.

Since 1 December 2010, the Australian and New Zealand versions of the subscription channel have been the same. The New Zealand-specific version of Nickelodeon shut down the day before.

The channel was removed from Foxtel on 1 August 2023, the same day as the free-to-air channel 10 Shake rebranded as Nickelodeon. The existing pay television channel continued to broadcast through Fetch in Australia until 1 November 2025, as well as on Sky in New Zealand until 2 December 2025. The Fetch feed was renamed "Nick", to differentiate it from the free-to-air channel.

== History ==
Nickelodeon Australia was launched on 23 October 1995, replacing the Max and ClassicMax channels, offering live action shows and cartoons. Originally the channel timeshared with Nick at Nite which began at 8 on weekdays and 10 pm on weekends, and ended at 6 am. From 1 July 1998, the channel gained an extra half-hour on weekdays, moving Nick at Nite back to 8.30 pm. On 2 January 2000, the channel introduced "More Nick", extending its broadcast hours to 10 pm every night of the week. Eventually in mid-2000, Nick at Nite closed and Nickelodeon began broadcasting for 24 hours every day. After that, almost all of Nick at Nite's programming moved to TV1. Nickelodeon was also added to the Optus Television service in December 2002.

On 14 March 2004, Nick Jr. launched as the first full, 24-hour television channel designed for pre-school audiences in Australia. Before this, Nick Jr. was a morning and afternoon programming block on Nickelodeon, including shows that eventually received much more airtime on the full channel, such as Dora the Explorer and Paw Patrol. For a few months after Nick Jr. became a full channel, it kept a 2-hour-long time slot on Nickelodeon, but it was drastically shorter than it was before it became a full channel. Nickelodeon and Nick Jr. began broadcasting in widescreen on 2 March 2009.

During Nickelodeon Australia's broadcast of the 2010 Kids' Choice Awards, the network rebranded with the new one using completely different bumpers than America's channel, however the iCarly bumper with slime was used in most advertisement breaks. The Nick Shack rebranded much earlier before the channel itself.

On 1 December 2010, Nickelodeon Australia launched in New Zealand, replacing the New Zealand version of Nickelodeon.

On 30 July 2013, Nickelodeon Australia became available on the newly launched Australian IPTV service Foxtel Play, making it one of the first channels to be available on the service.

On 3 December 2013, Nickelodeon Australia became available on Foxtel's streaming service Foxtel Go. On 1 January 2014, Nickelodeon Australia launched on Australian IPTV provider Fetch TV.

From 27 September 2020, a 12-hour block of Nickelodeon and Nick Jr. programming was broadcast on the new 10 Shake free-to-air channel.

On 22 June 2023, it was announced that 10 Shake itself would rebrand as Nickelodeon on 1 August. Foxtel chose to discontinue the pay television channel then using that name at this time, along with Nick Jr. The channel continued to air on Fetch in Australia and on Sky in New Zealand.

The channel was removed on Fetch TV on 1 November 2025.

The channel was discontinued in New Zealand on 2 December 2025 and was replaced by Sky Kids, ultimately shutting down the channel after 30 years on the air.

== Programming ==
Nickelodeon primarily aired a mix of both contemporary and older original programming seen on its American counterpart. The channel previously aired original programs such as Nickelodeon Australian Kids' Choice Awards, Camp Orange and Nick Takes Over Your School.

=== Programming blocks ===
- Nick at Nite – From Nickelodeon's launch until mid-2000, Nickelodeon shared its channel with an Australian version of Nick at Nite. Much of the programming was similar to the American channel at the time, including shows such as Mister Ed and Gilligan's Island. Eventually it was closed due to the expansion of Nickelodeon, as well as the existence of another channel, TV1, co-operated by another Viacom subsidiary, Paramount Pictures. Much of the programming was moved to TV1 and later some of it to the Sci Fi Channel.
- Sarvo – a block shown on weekday afternoons that was previously hosted by James Kerley and Dave Lawson. The duo left Sarvo on 23 February 2007. On 9 April 2007, Kerley and Lawson were replaced by Maude Garrett and Kyle Linahan. Sarvo aired in the afternoons and broadcast various Nicktoons such as SpongeBob SquarePants, Kappa Mikey, and Captain Flamingo as well as other shows such as Zoey 101. As well as children's programs, this show also featured interviews with celebrity guests and other behind the scenes extras. The block was discontinued in 2009.
- Weekend Mornings – a block of two episodes each of four Nicktoons on Saturday and Sunday mornings. It was originally named Double Up but was renamed after Nickelodeon's rebrand in 2006.
- Saturday Nick Television – a morning show that was launched in 2002, with special guest Britney Spears. This show was shot in Melbourne and involved games in which the live audience could participate in, celebrity interviews, performances, skits and more. Nickelodeon canceled the show in 2005, due to a low amount of audiences.
- Lunchtoon – a weekday lunchtime block that featured four half-hour episodes of a Nickelodeon show. It usually aired from 12 pm to 2 pm.
- Toons2Nite – broadcast classic Nickelodeon shows such as Rocko's Modern Life and Aaahh!!! Real Monsters in the late night hours of weeknights. It was originally named Classics, however it was since rebranded Toons2Nite. It aired a wide range of cartoons on every night.

== Other projects ==
=== Nick Takes Over Your Beach ===
Over the summers of 1995, 1996, 1998, 1999, 2000 and 2004, Nickelodeon toured Australian beaches, setting up games and activities.

=== Nickelodeon Magazine Australia ===
The Australian Nickelodeon Magazine was a monthly magazine available in most newsagents and supermarkets between September 2005 and May 2006. The American version of the magazine was sold in some Australian newsagents and supermarkets from 1995, coinciding with the launch of Australian pay TV providers Galaxy in January and Foxtel in October 1995. The Australian version was created in 2005. In total, six issues of the Australian Nickelodeon Magazine were published before being discontinued by Australian Consolidated Press. It was edited by former Australian Disney Adventures contributor, Santi Pintado. The Australian Nickelodeon Magazine content was borrowed heavily from its American counterpart, Nickelodeon Magazine. The first copy of the magazine was handed out free at the 2005 Nickelodeon Australian Kids' Choice Awards.

=== You're on Nick ===
Following Nickelodeon Australia's rebrand, the network launched Moby Nick, a bus that would tour around Australia in places such as Sydney Olympic Park. Part of the bus was a small recording studio, where children could say a sentence or two about what they could do, or who they were. The ten-second clips would be shown during commercials on Nickelodeon Australia shows.

=== Slimefest ===
In 2012, Nickelodeon launched Slimefest, a children's slime-filled annual music festival. It was first held in Sydney in September 2012, the first line up included Jessica Mauboy, Stan Walker, Justice Crew, Guy Sebastian, Reece Mastin, Johnny Ruffo and Christina Parie.

The 2013 line-up included headliners Big Time Rush, along with performances by Guy Sebastian, Justice Crew, Samantha Jade, Heffron Drive and Jadagrace.

In 2014, the festival toured in both Sydney and Melbourne, with performances by Cody Simpson, Savage, Justice Crew, Sabrina Carpenter, The Collective, Alli Simpson, Ricki Lee (Sydney) and Dami Im (Melbourne).

== Hosts ==
=== Former ===
- Angus King (1998–1999): Hot Chunks
- Jamie Croft (2003): sarvo
- Josh Quong Tart (2003): sarvo
- Dave "Kambo" Kambouris (2002–2003): sn:tv, Nickelodeon Australian Kids' Choice Awards (2003)
- Dave Lawson (2002–2007): sn:tv, Nick Takes Over Your School, Camp Orange, sarvo, Nickelodeon Australian Kids' Choice Awards (2005 and 2006)
- Natalie Garonzi (2002–2003): sn:tv, Nickelodeon Australian Kids' Choice Awards, sarvo
- Tony Brockman (2003–2005): sarvo, Nickelodeon Australian Kids' Choice Awards (2004)
- James Kerley (2003–2007): sarvo, Nickelodeon Australian Kids' Choice Awards (2004, 2005 and 2006)
- Emily Perry (2004–2005): sn:tv
- Jesse Tobin (2004–2005): sn:tv
- Maude Garrett (2006–2009): Camp Orange: Slimey Hollow, Camp Orange: The Mystery of Spaghetti Creek, Camp Orange: The Curse of the Emerald Eye, sarvo
- Kyle Linahan (2007–2009): sarvo
- Luke Ryan and Wyatt Nixon-Lloyd (2010–2015): Camp Orange
- Kristy Best (2016–2019): Slime Cup

== Logo History ==
1995–2010

2010 – 1 August 2023 (Concurrently used)

1 August 2023 – 1 November 2025 (Australia)
1 August 2023 – 2 December 2025 (New Zealand)

== See also ==
- Nickelodeon Australian Kids' Choice Awards
- Nick Jr. (Australia)
- NickMusic (Australia)
- Nickelodeon (United States)
