= Nickelodeon Australian Kids' Choice Awards =

Australian entertainment awards

Australian Nickelodeon Kids' Choice Awards
- Country: Australia
- Presented by: Nickelodeon
- Reward: KCA Blimp
- First award: 2003 (1st awards show)
- Final award: 2011 (9th awards show)

Television/radio coverage
- Network: Nickelodeon
- Runtime: Approx. 90-120 min. including commercials

The Australian Nickelodeon Kids' Choice Awards was an annual awards show that awarded entertainers with a blimp trophy, as voted by children. The show was usually held during October or November and a televised show was produced, touted as the "biggest party for kids on the planet". The Australian Nickelodeon Kids' Choice Awards were discontinued after 2011 and replaced by Nickelodeon Slimefest from 2012, although domestic categories continue to be voted for and awarded during continuity carried during the annual tape-delayed airing of the main US ceremony.

== Host cities ==
Year		Host City
1	5 October 2003	Dreamworld, Gold Coast
2	14 September 2004	Luna Park's Big Top, Sydney
3	20 September 2005	Sydney Entertainment Centre, Sydney
4	11 October 2006	Sydney Entertainment Centre, Sydney
5	10 October 2007	Sydney Entertainment Centre, Sydney
6	11 October 2008	Hisense Arena, Melbourne
7	13 November 2009	Hisense Arena, Melbourne
8	8 October 2010	Sydney Entertainment Centre, Sydney
9	7 October 2011	Sydney Entertainment Centre, Sydney

== Hosts ==
Year	Hosts
2003	Sophie Monk, Natalie Garonzi, Dave Lawson and David Kambouris
2004	James Kerley and Tony Brockman
2005	Jesse McCartney, James Kerley and Dave Lawson
2006	Sophie Monk, Dave Lawson and James Kerley
2007	Zac Efron and The Veronicas
2008	John Cena and Natalie Bassingthwaighte
2009	Delta Goodrem, Joel Madden and Benji Madden
2010	Liam Hemsworth, Jessica Mauboy and Jerry Trainor
2011	Jennette McCurdy and Nathan Kress

== Winners ==
=== 2003 ===
No Information

=== 2004 ===
Award	Winner
Fave Australian	Shannon Noll
TV Guide Fave TV Show	The Simpsons
Fave Song	Shannon Noll (Drive)
Fave Music Act	Delta Goodrem
Fave Music Video	Guy Sebastian (All I Need Is You)
Fave Sports Star	John Cena
Fave Celebrity Duo	James Kerley and Tony Brockman (Sarvo)
Fave Meanie	Dicko
Fave Movie	Shrek 2
Best Pash	Beau Brady and Bec Cartwright (Home and Away)
Fave Animal Star	Donkey from Shrek
Fave TV Star	Hilary Duff
Fave Book	Harry Potter series
Fave Video Game	The Simpsons Hit and Run
Fave Movie Hero	Harry Potter

=== 2005 ===
Award	Winner
Fave TV Star	Jason Smith (Home and Away)
Fave Rising Star	Sonny Bill Williams
Fave Sport Star	Ian Thorpe
Fave Music Artist	Guy Sebastian
Fave Video Game	The SpongeBob SquarePants Movie game
Fave Aussie	Guy Sebastian
Fave Music Video	(Goob Goob Ga Joob)
Fave Celebrity Duo	Andrew G and James Mathison
Fave Hottie	Jesse McCartney
Fave Pash	Tash and Robbie (Home and Away)
Fave Old Fart	Mark Holden (Australian Idol)
Fave Meanie	Big Brother
Fave Movie Star	Hilary Duff
Fave Movie	The SpongeBob SquarePants Movie
Fave TV Show	The Simpsons
Fave Music Group	Destiny's Child
Fave Book	The Harry Potter Series
Fave Animal Star	Donkey from Shrek

=== 2006 ===
Award	Winner
Fave Aussie	Guy Sebastian
Fave Aussie Artist	Ricki-Lee
Fave Aussie Group	The Veronicas
Fave Book	Harry Potter Series
Fave Celeb Duo	James Kerley and Dave Lawson
Fave Console Game	Nintendogs
Fave Funniest Person	Rove McManus
Fave Hottie (Female)	Stephanie McIntosh
Fave Hottie (Male)	Lee Harding
Fave International Artist	Hilary Duff
Fave International Group	Green Day
Fave Movie	High School Musical
Fave Movie Star (Male)	Jack Black
Fave Movie Star (Female)	Hilary Duff
Fave Old Fart	Dicko (Ian Dickson)
Fave Podcast	Camp Orange Maudecast (Maude Garrett)
So Hot Right Now	Australian Idol
Fave Song	This Time I Know It's For Real by Young Divas
Fave Sports Star (Female)	Liz Ellis
Fave Sports Star (Male)	Lleyton Hewitt
Fave Toon	The Simpsons
Fave TV Show	Blue Water High
Fave TV Star	Kate Ritchie

=== 2007 ===
Award	Winner
Fave Female Singer	Ricki-Lee
Fave Male Singer	Shannon Noll
Fave Band	The Veronicas
Fave International Singer	Pink
Fave International Band	Good Charlotte
Fave Song	Thnks Fr Th Mmrs by Fall Out Boy
Fave Nick Show	Drake & Josh
Fave Toon	SpongeBob SquarePants
Fave TV show	Australian Idol
Fave Female TV Star	Bree Amer
Fave Male TV Star	Rove McManus
Fave Hottie	Dean Geyer
Fave Duo	Hamish & Andy
Fave Movie	Shrek 3
Fave Movie Star	Zac Efron
So Hot Right Now	High School Musical 2
Biggest Greenie	Bindi Irwin
Fave Aussie	Bindi Irwin

=== 2008 ===
Award	Winner
Fave Action Show	Friday Night Live
Fave Comedy Show	Drake & Josh
Fave Toon	SpongeBob SquarePants
Fave Reality Show	So You Think You Can Dance Australia
Fave Music Show	Video Hits
Fave Drama Show	H_{2}O: Just Add Water
Fave TV Star	Rove McManus
Fave Movie	Kung Fu Panda
Fave Movie Star	Zac Efron
Fave Song	Shake It by Metro Station
Fave International Artist	Miley Cyrus
Fave International Band	Simple Plan
Fave Singer	Ricki-Lee
Fave Band	The Veronicas
Fave Sports Star	John Cena
Fave Aussie	Rove McManus
Fave Greenie	Bindi Irwin
Funniest Duo	Maude Garrett & Kyle Linahan
So Hot Right Now	Australian Idol

=== 2009 ===
Award	Winner
Fave Aussie Singer	Jessica Mauboy
Fave Aussie Band	Short Stack
Fave Song	"I Gotta Feeling" by Black Eyed Peas
Fave International Band	The Black Eyed Peas
Fave International Singer	Pink
Fave Movie	Twilight
Fave Movie	Kung Fu Panda
Fave Movie Star	Zac Efron
Fave Comedy Show	ICarly
Fave Drama Show	Lady Gaga
Fave International TV Star	Drake Bell
Fave Reality TV Show	Masterchef Australia
Fave TV Star	Rove McManus
Fave Toon	SpongeBob SquarePants
Fave Sports Star	Unknown
Fave Aussie	Rove McManus
Fave Aussie Hottie	Dean Geyer
So Hot Right Now	Guy Sebastian
Biggest Greenie	Bindi & Robert Irwin

=== 2010 ===
Award	Winner
Best Book	Twilight Series
Fresh Aussie Muso (Male)	Cody Simpson
Fresh Aussie Muso (Female)	Jessica Mauboy
Fave International Band	The Black Eyed Peas
Fave Song	"California Gurls" by Katy Perry ft Snoop Dogg
Fave TV Show	iCarly
Fave TV Star	Selena Gomez (The Wizards of Waverly Place)
Fave Reality Show	Camp Orange
Top Toon	SpongeBob SquarePants
The LOL Award	iCarly Cast
Cutest Couple	Zac Efron & Vanessa Hudgens
Hottest Hottie	Taylor Lautner
Awesome Aussie	Rove McManus
Platinum Achievement Award	Jessica Watson
Big Kid Award	Drake Bell
Fave Movie	The Twilight Saga: Eclipse
Favourite Movie Star	Miley Cyrus
Fave Kiss	Miley Cyrus & Liam Hemsworth (The Last Song)

=== 2011 ===
Award	Winner
Hottest Guy Hottie	Justin Bieber
Superfresh Award	Cody Simpson
Fave Song	"Party Rock Anthem" by LMFAO
Get Real Award	Australia's Got Talent
Fave Toon	SpongeBob SquarePants
Fave Aussie Muso	Cody Simpson
Hottest Girl Hottie	Victoria Justice
Fave TV Star	Selena Gomez
LoL Award	Jennette McCurdy
Baddest Baddie	Kyle Sandilands
Awesome Oldie	Matt Preston
Hall of Slime	Bindi and Robert Irwin
Fave Movie	Harry Potter and the Deathly Hallows – Part 2
Awesome Aussie	Cody Simpson
Slime Minister	Julia Gillard

== Nickelodeon Slimefest ==
Nickelodeon Slimefest is an Australian annual music festival held at Sydney Olympic Park. The show is held in September and televised on Nickelodeon. The festival replaced the Nickelodeon Australian Kids' Choice Awards in 2012.

== See also ==
- Nickelodeon US Kids' Choice Awards
- Nickelodeon UK Kids' Choice Awards
