= Camp Orange =

- Genre: Reality television
- Presented by: Dave Lawson (2005); Maude Garrett (2006–09); Luke Ryan (2010-14); Wyatt Nixon-Lloyd (2010–14)
- Country of origin: Australia
- Original language: English
- No. of seasons: 13 (Australia), 2 (UK)

Production
- Running time: 30 mins (inc. commercials)
- Production companies: Total Perspection (Season 1-2); Fox World Australia (Season 3); Nickelodeon Productions Australia

Original release
- Network: Nickelodeon
- Release: 18 February 2005 – 2015

Camp Orange was an Australian children's reality television show broadcast on Nickelodeon. The first season premiered in February 2005. The latest season, Camp Orange: Twisted Siblings, premiered on 27 June 2015.

The format has been adapted and produced for international markets, including Italy and, more recently, the UK. The latter, which was filmed and produced in Australia, premiered on 22 July 2011 in the UK and Ireland.

== Overview ==
The show stars teams of best friends, selected from thousands of video audition entries that kids send in from across Australia and New Zealand, vying for the outdoor adventure of a lifetime. They battle it out in messy physical challenges that test their wits and their teamwork skills in order to win prizes. Starting from season 5, contestants would vote at the end of each day for 'Champ Orange', the best and fairest. From season 9, 'Champ Orange' is voted for by the public.

== Season overview ==
Season	Episodes	Originally aired		Host(s)
Season	Episodes	Season premiere	Season finale	Host(s)
1	6	18 February 2005	2005	Dave Lawson
2	7	2006		Maude Garrett
3	7	28 May 2007	4 July 2007	Maude Garrett
4	6	2008		Maude Garrett
5	4	2009		Maude Garrett
6		20 July 2010	2010	Luke Ryan; Wyatt Nixon-Lloyd
7		19 July 2011	16 August 2011	Luke Ryan; Wyatt Nixon-Lloyd
8		26 June 2012	2012	Luke Ryan; Wyatt Nixon-Lloyd; Jennette McCurdy
9	6	25 June 2013	30 July 2013	Luke Ryan; Wyatt Nixon-Lloyd
10	6	2014		Luke Ryan; Wyatt Nixon-Lloyd; Matt Bennett
11	6	27 June 2015	1 August 2015	Jack Griffo; Kira Kosarin

== Seasons ==
=== Season 1 (2005) ===
==== Camp Orange ====
Team name	Contestants
The DJs (winners)	Demiere Rechichi & Julia Brand
The Bush Bashers	Jack Murray & Mick Corcoran
Club Sandwich	Andrew Diamond & William Mann
Frizz 'n' Skitz	Thandi Phoenix & Alicia Barclay Smith

=== Season 2 (2006) ===
==== Camp Orange: Slimey Hollow ====
Team name	Contestants
Thunder Monkeys	Oscar King & Oscar Woods
Dancing Dodos	Chester Lenihan & Thorsten Hertog
Krazy Kardeez	Karly Ronan & Kaydee Grant
Salted Peanuts	Kimberley Hew-Low & Isabelle Ng

=== Season 3 (2007) ===
==== Camp Orange: The Mystery of Spaghetti Creek ====
The filming location was at Old Mogo Gold Rush Town in Mogo NSW. After the previous season, Total Perception lost the rights to Camp Orange, with Fox World Australia taking over production.

Team name	Contestants
Bee's Knees	Eva Gillespie & Nina Clarke
Mix Ups	Kit Bradley & Zack Inglis
Booty Kickers	Daniela Glavan & Maddi Kowal
Dark Evil Bunnies	Ryan Ludowyke & Harry Black

=== Season 4 (2008) ===
==== Camp Orange: The Curse of the Emerald Eye ====
Team Name	Contestants
E-Bash (winners)	Ashlee Mather & Ebony Roach
Shorties	Harley & Ty Telford
L.A. Blitz	Ally & Lauren
Gromstars	Jake & Sean Ryan

=== Season 5 (2009) ===
==== Camp Orange: The Final Frontier ====
The season teams were:

Team name	Contestants
Llamas in Pajamas	Coco & Amber
Cheese and Crackers	Rachel & Kate
Saddled-up Sickos	Matt & Dan
1hitwonders (winners)	Baxter & Nick

=== Season 6 (2010) ===
==== Camp Orange: Castle Mountain ====
This is the first season to be hosted by Luke Ryan and Wyatt Nixon-Lloyd. There were four teams:

Team name	Contestants
The Wanna Beez	Brittany & Niall (1st ever boy/girl team)
The Awkward Turtles	Darcy & Emily
The Mighty Melbournians	Deon & Brody
The Castle Katz	Lara & Chelsea

The winners of Champ Orange, the viewer voted champions, were Mighty Melbournians a.k.a. Deon & Brody from Victoria. The winners of Camp Orange were Team: Wanna Beez a.k.a. Niall & Brittany from New South Wales.

=== Season 7 (2011) ===
==== Camp Orange: Wrong Town ====
Season 7 was hosted by Luke and Wyatt. It was positioned as the grossest, slimiest and wrongest Camp Orange ever. This season, there were a few differences to previous seasons, including the first ever New Zealand team (The Awesome 2SUM), and a surprise fifth team (The Flip Sisters).

This season teams were:

Team name	Contestants
The Unforgettables	Daniel & Jayce
The Mighty Wood Ducks	Cooper & Jake
The Pickled Peppers	Ella & Payton
The Awesome 2SUM	Kenzlee & Grace (NZ)
The Flip Sisters	Anna & Grace

The Flip Sisters arrived on the second day of Camp Orange as a surprise twist to the other contestants. The winners of Champ Orange were The Mighty Wood Ducks (Cooper and Jake).

=== Season 8 (2012) ===
==== Camp Orange: Boys vs Girls ====
Season 8 was hosted by Luke and Wyatt, and co-hosted by iCarly's Jennette McCurdy. This season pitted the girls' teams against boys' teams. Each team was led by a mentor, Wyatt (boys) and Jennette (girls). The season premiered on Tuesday, 26 June at 3:00 PM on Nickelodeon (Australia and New Zealand).

Teams featured in the season were:

Team name	Contestants
The Grizzly Girls	Monique & Giorgia
The Ballistic Bellybuttons	Charlotte & Harmony
The Mega Monkeys	Sam & Koen
The Bulldozers	Tyler & Toby

The overall winners of the Camp Orange: Boys vs Girls were the girls' team (The Ballistic Belly-Buttons and The Grizzly Girls). The winners of Champ Orange were the Grizzly Girls (Monique and Giorgia).

=== Season 9 (2013) ===
==== Camp Orange: Spill Seekers ====
Season 9 was hosted by Luke & Wyatt. For the first time, the show was filmed at Seaworld Australia on the Gold Coast.

Teams featured in the season were:

Team name	Contestants	Challenges Won
The Bubblegum Besties	Brooke & Charlie	4
The Bob Shermans	Lindy & Meg	1 & Champ Orange
The Random Penguins	Noah & Josh	1
The Nick Jaggers	Josh & Jye	5

=== Season 10 (2014) ===
==== Camp Orange: Force 10 ====
The tenth season of Camp Orange was hosted by Luke and Wyatt with guest presenter Matt Bennett. Filming took place again at Seaworld Australia in March. This season had 10 contestants (5 teams) from the start. The season premiered in June 2014 and there were 6 episodes.

This season contestants were:

Team name	Contestants	Country	Challenges Won
The Mighty Mermaids	Sammy Farina & Millie Lloyd	AUS	Tied 2
M-Tastics	Mika & Marian	AUS	2 (Tied 1) & Mega Challenge
Kiwi Cuzzies	Kaha & Zion	NZ	Tied 2 & Champ Orange
Joco Locos	Coco & Josh	NZ	3
Twisted Twins	Josh & Luke	AUS	2 (Tied 1)

=== Season 11 (2015) ===
==== Camp Orange: Twisted Siblings ====
The season was hosted by Jack Griffo and Kira Kosarin, who portrayed twins Max and Phoebe on the Nickelodeon live-action comedy The Thundermans. They travelled to the Australian bush to lead four teams of sibling duos, selected from auditions submitted by children across Australia and New Zealand, through a series of challenges designed to test teamwork, endurance, and tolerance for messy and gross-out elements.

The winning team, as voted by viewers, was crowned Nickelodeon's Star Siblings in a live series finale and awarded a recurring role as Nickelodeon’s official kid reporters. Viewers were also given the opportunity to participate in the series by entering for a chance to appear as the fifth team in the finale. In some challenges, winning teams were required to nominate rival teams to participate in eating challenges involving the “Barf Buggy,” which contained unusual food items.

Camp Orange was a Nickelodeon Australia production and had previously received ASTRA Awards in 2008, 2009, and 2010. The series was designed as a children’s reality competition set in outdoor Australian locations.

The season premiered on 27 June 2015 as part of Nickelodeon's All New Saturdays.

The season's campers were:

Team name	Colour	Contestants	Country/State	Challenges Won
The Twinvincibles	Yellow	Wynton & Myles	NSW in AUS	1
Ginger Ninjas	Red	Torin & Egan	QLD in AUS	1
Waybad Sisters (winners)	Black	Deni & Mika	QLD in AUS	1, tied one with Bro Zealanders & Camp Orange
Bro Zealanders	Blue	Conner & Liam	NZ	Tied one with the Waybad Sisters
