= The Riff =

- Genre: Music videos
- Directed by: Bernie Zelvis
- Country of origin: Australia
- Original language: English

Production
- Producer: Ian McBride

Original release
- Network: Channel V Australia
- Release: 9 December 2010 – 2015

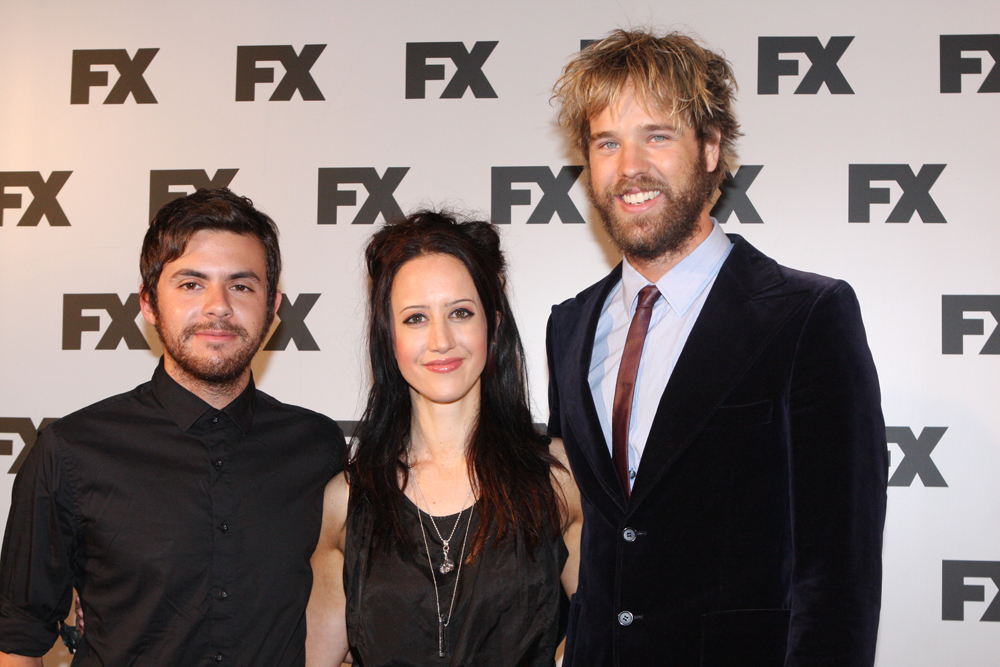
Billy Russell, Jane Gazzo and Danny Clayton in 2012

The Riff was an Australian music video and entertainment television show that aired 6 days on Channel [V]. Presenters included Danny Clayton, Jane Gazzo, Billy Russell, Carissa Walford and Marty Smiley, who would riff and debate pop culture, news and what fires them up. The show ran from 9 December 2010 to 2015.

== See also ==
- List of Australian music television shows
- WhatUwant
