= B430 =

- Genre: Travel
- Country of origin: Australia
- Original language: English
- No. of seasons: 4

Production
- Producer: Sally King

Original release
- Network: Channel V Australia
- Release: 2009 – 2015

B430 was an Australian travel television program on Channel [V]. It was based on 10 locations to visit before turning 30. It was hosted by Danny Clayton, Renee Bargh, Jane Gazzo, Kyle Linahan, Brendan Maclean, James Kerley and Billy Russell.
