= Larry Oltmanns =

American architect

- Born: January 28, 1951 (age 75); Rockford, Illinois, United States
- Education: University of Illinois
- Occupation: Architect
- Practice: Vx3 Architects.Strategists.Urban Designers

Larry Oltmanns (born 1951, in Rockford, Illinois) is an American architect. He has achieved recognition for his work as an architect and master planner of large-scale mixed-use developments worldwide. Oltmanns is Design Director and CEO of Vx3 Architects.Strategists.Urban Designers.

== Career ==
Oltmanns graduated from the University of Illinois in 1973 with a BA in Architecture.

Oltmanns spent more than 30 years with Skidmore, Owings & Merrill (SOM), initially in their Chicago office and later as Design Partner of SOM London. He led the design teams responsible for many landmarks including Rondo 1 in Warsaw, 10 Exchange Square at Broadgate in London, the Convention and Exhibition Centre (COEX) at the Korea World Trade Centre and the multi award-winning Hong Kong Convention & Exhibition Centre. His competition-winning design for the new extension to the Melbourne Convention & Exhibition Centre was awarded a 6 Star Green Star environmental rating by the Green Building Council of Australia, the first in the world for a convention centre.

In 2004, following a round of redundancies and management problems with their NATO Headquarters project, Oltmanns chose to leave SOM.

Oltmanns founded Vx3 in April 2007. One of his firm’s first projects was the master plan for the $2 billion redevelopment of Euston Station in London. Current projects include three mixed-use developments in central London of over 3,000,000 square feet (280,000 m^{2}), plus large-scale residential and commercial projects in Moscow, Warsaw, Calgary, and Dublin.

== Awards ==
Oltmanns has won numerous awards for design excellence, including the American Institute of Architects, the Royal Australian Institute of Architects and the City of Seoul, Korea.

Oltmanns served on London’s International Convention Centre Commission in 2004/5. He is a long-standing member of the International Congress & Convention Association (ICCA).

== Notable projects ==
- Chicago Place at 700 North Michigan Avenue, Chicago
- Adelaide Convention Centre Expansion, South Australia
- Melbourne Convention and Exhibition Centre
- National Trade Centre at Exhibition Place, Toronto
- NATO Headquarters, Brussels
- Rondo 1, Warsaw
- Lopez Centre, Manilla as CEO and Design Director of Vx3 Architects.Strategists.Urban Designers
- Hong Kong Convention and Exhibition Centre, Hong Kong
- COEX Convention & Exhibition Center, Seoul, Korea
- Dublin Airport, Terminal 1 Pier D, Dublin
- Dallas Convention Center, Dallas
- 10 Exchange Square, London
