= Swap Shop =

Swap Shop may refer to:

- A Give-Away Shop
- The Fort Lauderdale Swap Shop, Florida, a 14-screen drive-in theater complex and flea market

== Entertainment ==
- Swap Shop (Australian TV series), a 1988 Australian Broadcasting Corporation children's television program
- Multi-Coloured Swap Shop (1976–1982), a BBC One Saturday morning television programme
  - Basil's Swap Shop, a 2008 relaunch of the BBC show, starring puppet character Basil Brush
- Williams Street Swap Shop, live-streaming show produced by Williams Street
- Swap Shop (WRGS program), a "tradio" radio program broadcast in Rogersville, Tennessee since 1957
- Tradio, a radio program where listeners can call in to buy and sell items
