= WhatUwant =

whatUwant
- Genre: Music videos
- Directed by: Bernie Zelvis
- Country of origin: Australia
- Original language: English
- No. of episodes: 1500+

Production
- Producer: Sally King

Original release
- Network: Channel V Australia
- Release: April 2002 – 7 November 2008

whatUwant was an Australian music video request television show that aired daily on Channel [V].

whatUwant first aired in April 2002 and broadcast over 1500 episodes. On 13 October 2008, Foxtel revealed that the show would close on 7 November 2008.

The show was directed by Bernie Zelvis and past hosts include Yumi Stynes, Australian Idol hosts Andrew G and James Mathison, and James Kerley. whatUwant's final line-up of hosts was Renee Bargh, Danny Clayton and Jane Gazzo.

== See also ==
- List of Australian music television shows
