= Girlband =

Girlband or "girl band" can refer to:

- An all-female band, where all members of a musical group are female
- A girl group, where only the singers are female
- Girlband (Australian band), a pop group
- Girlband (English band), contestants on The X Factor
- Gilla Band, rock band previously known as Girl Band
- Girl Band, a 2000 television film starring Matthew Lawrence

== See also ==
- Girl (band), an English glam metal band
- Girls (band), an American indie rock band
