= Brent Street =

Dance school in Sydney, AUS

- Established: 1986; 40 years ago
- Director: Lucas Newland
- Location: Building 101/122 Lang Rd, Moore Park, Sydney, New South Wales
- Website: https://brentstreet.com.au

Brent Street Studios (colloquially known as Brent Street) is an Australian independent tertiary education provider specialising in the performing arts. Based in Sydney, Brent Street operates out of the Entertainment Quarter at Fox Studios. Brent Street offers full-time courses, as well as recreational and elite programs.

Brent Street also offers a specialised Academy Program (Brent Street Academy, BSA). This functions as a performing arts high school equivalent for students interested in excelling in elite dance and performing arts. This program runs from years 7-12, and offers a Certificate IV in Dance for students in years 11-12.

== History ==
Brent Street was founded in 1986 by Jacqui, Karen, and Marianne Howard, originally located at 'Brent Street', Drummoyne, Sydney. Due to class size demands, the studio then moved to a larger premises in Rozelle, then to Camperdown. The studio was then based at Waterloo until 2007, when they finally settled at Fox Studios. In 2015, Lucas Newland took over the company, and has been the owner and artistic director ever since.

Brent Street's creative team have founded two agencies that they work closely with, namely Focus Talent Management, and Brent Street Agency. The latter is a children's agency that represents actors, singers, and dancers. Focus Talent is the studios adult agency who represents four key divisions; actors, dancers, musical theatre and creatives.

In 2024, Brent Street participated in the 19th season of America's Got Talent and won a golden buzzer in their audition from Howie Mandel. This progressed the dance troupe to the live rounds, where they ended as a finalist.

== Courses ==
Brent Street is a Registered Training Organisation that offers accredited dance and performing arts courses. The courses offered include full-time Contemporary, Musical Theatre, and Performing Arts courses. Both the contemporary and performing arts course offer an Advanced Diploma of Professional Dance (Elite Performance) upon completion, while the musical theatre course offers a Diploma of Musical Theatre upon finishing the course.

The contemporary course involves the practice of internationally recognised techniques such as: Graham, Horton, release technique, partner work, floorwork, and tumbling.

The musical theatre course offers education in: classical ballet and jazz, jazz technique, theatre jazz, tap, acting, ballet, voice work, ensemble singing, and workshops with industry professionals.

The performing arts course students take classes in: jazz, commercial jazz, musical theatre, contemporary, lyrical, hip hop, classical ballet, tap, latin, heels, fitness, conditioning, technique, singing and acting.

Brent Street also offers a part-time program for children aged 2-6, and a recreational program for students aged between 7-16.

The Academy Program students are offered further training outside of typical school in the form of a Performance Training Program (PTP) and is included in Academy tuition. It also offers regular ATAR and HSC senior subjects alongside performing arts training.

Brent Street is partnered with SocietyOne to offer student loans.

== Dance Life (2024-) ==
Dance Life is an unscripted docuseries that follows 10 dancers from the Brent Street full-time class of 2022 as they navigate their final year with the academy, and follows their journey up to their graduation performances. Dance Life was released originally on Amazon Prime Video in January 2024, and then was additionally released on ABC iview. The class of 2022 were all interviewed and auditioned for a chance to be on the show. There are five episodes in season one, all directed by Luke Cornish. All five episodes received ratings between 9.2-9.6 out of 10.

In 2025, it was announced that there would be a second season being filmed with 10 dancers set to graduate in 2026.

== Alumni ==
Notable alumni include:

- Charlotte Best - Logie nominated actress known for Puberty Blues and Home and Away.
- Jordan Rodrigues - Emmy nominated actor known for Dance Academy, Light as a Feather, The Fosters, and The Lion King.
- Ashleigh Cummings - Multi award winning actress known for Tomorrow, When the War Began, Puberty Blues, and Hounds of Love.
- Christopher Horsey - Award winning choreographer and actor known for Swing on This, and his choreography for various tap shows and musical performances.
- Renee Bargh - Former Girlband member and entertainment reporter, known for Dancing with the Stars and hosting The Voice.
- Sharni Vinson - Actress known for Patrick, Home and Away, and Australian Survivor: Heroes V Villains.
- Cheree Cassidy - AFI nominated actress known for Underbelly, The Time of Our Lives, and Home and Away.
- Michael Dameski - Dancer known for his appearance in Lady Gaga's 'Abracadabra' music video, World of Dance, So You Think You Can Dance, and his lead role in Billy Elliot the Musical.
- Tanika Anderson - Actress known for Hi-5 as well as the Australian touring shows of Frozen and Beauty and the Beast.

Brent Street has also produced members of the following bands:

- Sister2Sister - ARIA award winning duo who have performed with Delta Goodrem.
- Girlband - Pop band who supported Rogue Traders on tour.

== Staff ==
Notable staff of the institution have included:

- Lucas Newland - Choreographer known for his work on American Idiot, Home and Away, All Saints, Australia's Got Talent, and Live to Dance.
- Cassie Bartho - Choreographer and dancer who has choreographed for Katy Perry, The Masked Singer, Love Island, and J Balvin.
- Jacob Yarr - Hip-hop dancer and actor who appeared in Born to Dance and Step Up. He has won two gold medals at the 'World Hip Hop Championships' while being a part of hip-hop crew 'Royal Family'.
- Ryan Sheppard - Dancer and singer who originated the role of Chistery in the Australian tour of Wicked, with roles in The Book of Mormon, and We Will Rock You.
- Sally Dashwood - Tap dancer, choreographer, and performer who has appeared on Dance Academy, The X factor, The Voice, Australia's Got Talent, and So You Think You Can Dance. She is also the artistic director of tap dance group 'Girls On Tap'.
- Paris Cavanagh - ADF award winning choreographer who had work featured on America's Got Talent. She choreographed for Interscope Records' Hit Me Hard and Soft campaign. She has worked with Jason Derulo, Jessica Mauboy, and Kylie Minogue.
- Stephen Tannos - Actor, dancer and choreographer known for So You Think You Can Dance, Cats (musical), and Fame (musical).
- John Noble - Head of Drama, 1997–2000
