= COVID-19 pandemic in South Australia =

- Disease: COVID-19
- Pathogen: SARS-CoV-2
- Location: South Australia, Australia
- First outbreak: Wuhan, Hubei, China
- Confirmed cases: 939,051 (as of 3 November 2023)
- Active cases: 1,687 (as of 3 November 2023)
- Hospitalised cases: 36 (as of 3 November 2023)
- Critical cases: 4 (as of 3 November 2023)
- Recovered: 935,740 (as of 3 November 2023)
- Deaths: 1,624 (as of 3 November 2023)
- Fatality rate: 0.17%

Government website
- www.covid-19.sa.gov.au

The COVID-19 pandemic in South Australia was part of the worldwide pandemic of the coronavirus disease 2019 (COVID-19) caused by severe acute respiratory syndrome coronavirus 2 (SARS-CoV-2).

== Timeline ==
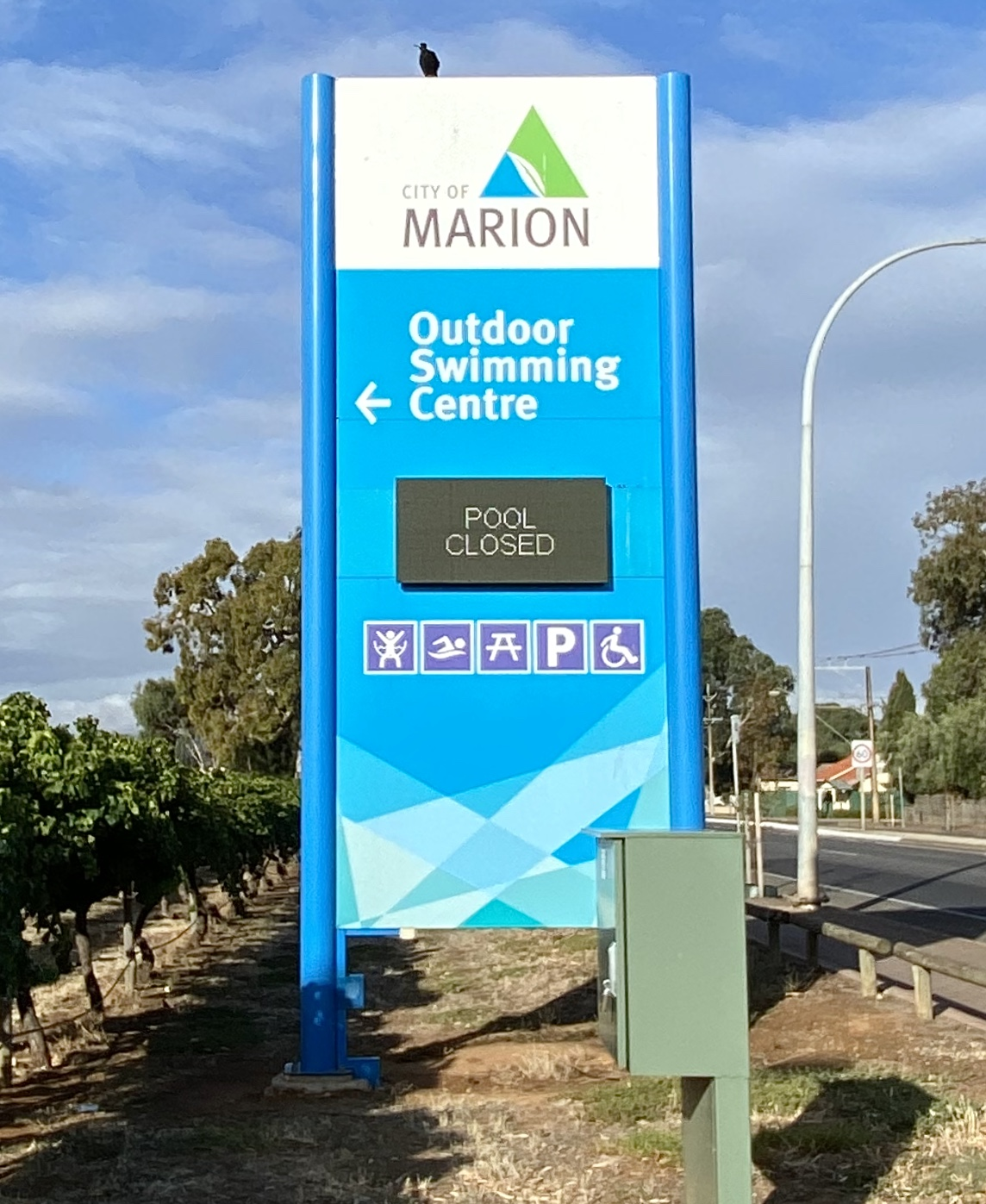
A "pool closed" sign outside the Marion Outdoor Swimming Centre in Park Holme, South Australia, April 2020

=== 2020 ===
On 11 March, the SA state government announced its A$350 million economic stimulus measures.

On 15 March, a public health emergency was declared in South Australia.

On 22 March, a "major emergency" was declared, giving the police power to enforce self-isolation rules.

On 24 March, state borders were closed. People arriving in the state were required to sign a declaration that they would self-isolate for 14 days and provide an address to the police, with penalties for failure to comply.

On 27 March, a direction was made under the Emergency Management Act 2004 to prohibit gatherings of more than 10 people, and a limit of 1 person per four square metres.

The African Nations Cup, a soccer tournament for African Australian players which had taken place in Adelaide annually since 2001, was cancelled.

On 8 November the SA government announced that in the state budget it would double its coronavirus economic stimulus package to AU$4 billion.

On 16 November, "a number of significant restrictions" were reintroduced after an outbreak of coronavirus in the northern suburbs of Adelaide.

==== Woodville outbreak ====
On 18 November, a six-day lockdown from midnight that day was announced. Afterwards there was to be another eight days of "significant restrictions" according to Police Commissioner Grant Stevens. On 21 November, Premier Steven Marshall announced that the state's "circuit breaker" restrictions would be ending three days earlier on 21 November after authorities discovered that one of the positive cases at the Woodville Pizza Bar coronavirus hotspot in the western Adelaide suburb of Woodville had misled contact tracers by concealing the fact that he worked at the shop. As part of the easing of "circuit breaker restrictions", groups of 50 people were allowed to attend private functions and funerals, ten people to attend private functions, and 100 people allowed to attend restaurants and pubs.

=== 2021 ===
On 12 February 2021, the World Solar Challenge (SWC) for that year was cancelled by the SA Government.

On 5 March 2021, the first Australian received the Oxford-AstraZeneca vaccine. A doctor in regional South Australia, she was dosed at Murray Bridge Hospital.

On 30 April, South Australia's first COVID-19 mass vaccination hub opened at Adelaide Showground.

In mid-June, sniffer dogs were deployed on a trial basis at Adelaide Airport to detect people with COVID-19 infections.

Due to a growing cluster in Bondi, Sydney, on 23 June South Australia "immediately" reinstated a hard border with NSW. No one who had been in NSW in the past 14 days was allowed entry to SA. A border buffer of 100 km was in place. Exemption were available for residents returning to SA, essential travellers, and special cases.

On 28 June, from midnight, SA pre-emptively re-introduced a number of restrictions for at least 7 days:

- masks mandatory in high-risk settings
  - aged care homes,
  - hospitals and other "personal care settings"
  - indoor entertainment venues
- not required, but highly recommended on public transport
- In licensed premises:
  - no "communal consumption"
  - no buffets
  - restrictions on shisha venues
- Some restriction on singing.

On 11 July, a 72-year-old woman with thrombosis with thrombocytopenia syndrome (TTS) died in Royal Adelaide Hospital. She was vaccinated with AstraZeneca on 24 June, then admitted on 5 July.

On 19 July, from midnight "level 4" restrictions were introduced after a traveller from overseas (via quarantine and hospital in Sydney) and two close contacts all tested positive. The restrictions were due to be reviewed on 23 July. Restrictions included:

- indoor dining banned, only outdoor dining allowed
- non-essential retail closed
- gyms and indoor fitness facilities closed
- contact sport cancelled
- personal care services closed
- Density requirements at indoor venues:
  - one person per four square metres
  - private gatherings capped at 10
- Masks required for:
  - high-risk settings
  - public transport
  - shared indoor spaces
- Events requiring COVID management plans were cancelled.

==== Lockdown ====
On 20 July, from 6pm, South Australia went into lockdown for 7 days. This was after a 5 case cluster of the Delta variant emerged linked to Modbury Hospital. By this date, approximately 3,000 people were in quarantine at home. The only reasons to leave home were:

- essential work
- care for someone
- purchase essential goods-food,
- exercise
  - only with people from the same household
  - within 2.5 kilometres of home
  - 90 minutes per day maximum
- healthcare (including vaccination and COVID testing)
  - elective surgery on hold
- Schools to close from 21 July
  - 24-hour transition period for teachers to arrange at-home learning
- construction work to be halted.

The lockdown led to panic buying, and the cancellations of AVCon, the Royal Adelaide Show, the Adelaide Beer and Barbeque Festival, Winter Reds wine festival and the Illuminate Adelaide festival. The reopening of the Gawler railway line, originally set for November 2021, was also delayed to 12 June 2022, after being further delayed from a 30 April reopening by the state election.

The lockdown ended on 27 July.

==== Suppression Phase ====
On 23 November, after the state hit 80% vaccination coverage for 16 and older, it opened its borders to the rest of the country, including New South Wales, Victoria and the ACT. This signalled a change from an elimination strategy to a suppression strategy in controlling the virus.

On 1 December, the state recorded its first two cases of community transmission since the borders opened, two men aged in their 50s. The next day on 2 December, it recorded another 18 new cases, 16 linked to a high school reunion in Norwood, Adelaide. The cases included former premier Jay Weatherill.

==== Omicron Variant ====
On 10 December, the Omicron variant was detected in two interstate travellers that came to South Australia. As a result, there were changes to the rules; travellers coming to SA from New South Wales and Victoria were now required to be tested on day 6 as well as on arrival. Several high-risk exposure sites were listed, where anyone who entered had to quarantine for 14 days. These restrictions were eased on 14 and 15 December respectively.

In mid-December it was discovered that an Adelaide teenager went to various venues knowing that he was COVID positive. He was subsequently charged by police.

On 26 December a 94-year-old woman with COVID-19 died, the fifth COVID related death in SA, and the first in over 20 months. There were 842 new cases, raising the total cases to 5,162 since the pandemic began, with over 80% occurring since 23 November when SA repealed its border restrictions. 81% of the new cases were the Omicron variant of COVID-19. Among the new cases, 513 people were vaccinated, 117 unvaccinated, the rest unknown. SA had 3,974 active cases.

Also on 26 December, after a week of exponentially rising case numbers, with over 80 percent believed to be caused by the Omicron variant, the government reintroduced certain restrictions. These included home gathering caps reduced from 30 to 10 people, and hospitality venues would have to reduce capacity to 25% indoors and 50% outdoors. Citizens were asked to reduce travel around the state, as health authorities were concerned about the variants ability to overwhelm the health system.

On 30 December the death of a COVID-19 child under 2-years-old was reported, the sixth person with COVID to die in SA. There were 1,374 new cases, 37 cases in hospital, 4 in intensive care.

Due to expected very hot weather, COVID testing sites were to close between 10:30am and 5:30pm on New Year's Eve and New Year's Day. Some testing sites extended their evening hours.

=== 2022 ===
On 7 January, 2 deaths were reported, raising the states' COVID related deaths to 10 in total. Both were women, one in her 60s, one her 90s.
There were 3,707 new cases, raising to 31,513 the total confirmed cases, and there were 24,901 active cases.
144 cases were hospitalised, 16 in ICU, 1 on a ventilator.
Of those in hospital, 87 were fully vaccinated, 14 either unvaccinated or partially vaccinated, and 43 were unknown.

On 8 January, 5 deaths were reported, raising the states' COVID related deaths by 50% to 15 in total. There was: 1 in their 50s, 1 their 60s, 1 their 70s, and 2 in their 90s.
New cases that day were up ~40% to 4,274 from 3,707 the day before, and raising to nearly 36,000 the total confirmed cases.
164 cases (up ~15%) were hospitalised, 16 in ICU, 2 on a ventilator. 80% of ICU patients were un-vaccinated.

On 9 January, 1 death was reported of a man in his 90s, raising the states' COVID related deaths to 16 in total.
New cases that day were 4,506, up ~5% from 4,274 the day before, and raising to about 40,000 the total confirmed cases, and there were 27,762 active cases.
176 cases were hospitalised, 18 in ICU, 2 on a ventilator.

On 10 January, 2 deaths were reported: a woman in her 80s and a man in his 90s, raising the states' COVID related deaths to 16 in total.
New cases that day were 4,024, down ~11% from 4,506 the day before, and raising to about 44,000 the total confirmed cases, and there were 29,489 active cases.
188 cases were hospitalised, 121 in ICU, 4 on a ventilator. Of those in hospital, 107 were fully vaccinated, 18 either unvaccinated or partially vaccinated, and 63 were unknown.

On 12 January, 7 deaths were reported: 6 women, 1 in her 60s, 1 her 70s, 2 their 80s, and 2 their 90s; 1 man in his 90s, raising the states' COVID related deaths to 26 in total.
New cases were 3,715, down ~8% from 4,024 the day before, and raising to about 51,000 total confirmed cases, and there were 32,067 active cases.
190 cases were hospitalised, 27 in ICU, 6 on a ventilator. Of those in hospital, 108 were fully vaccinated, 18 either unvaccinated or partially vaccinated, and 64 were unknown.

On 15 January, 4 deaths were reported: 3 women, 1 in her 80s, 2 their 90s; 1 man in his 90s, raising the states' COVID related deaths to 40 total.
New cases were 4,349, up ~17% from 3,715 the day before, and raising to about 64,266 total confirmed cases, and there were 34,725 active cases.
246 cases were hospitalised, 26 in ICU, 7 on a ventilator. Of those in hospital, 129 were fully vaccinated, 34 either unvaccinated or partially vaccinated, and 73 were unknown.

On 18 January, 2 deaths were reported: a man in his 80s, a man in his 90s, raising the states' COVID related deaths to 44 total.
New cases were 3,079, down ~30% from 4,349 the day before, and raising to about 73,918 total confirmed cases, and there were 32,530 active cases.
285 cases were hospitalised, 24 in ICU, 5 on a ventilator. Of those in hospital, 151 were fully vaccinated, 43 either unvaccinated or partially vaccinated, and 91 were unknown.

On 25 January, 5 deaths were reported, 2 women, 1 in her 70s, 1 aged over 100; 3 men, 1 in his 80s, 2 their 90s. This raised to 74 the states' total of COVID related deaths.
New cases were 1,869, raising to about 93,165 total confirmed cases, and there were 30,641 active cases.
287 cases were hospitalised, 32 in ICU, 5 on a ventilator. Of those in hospital, 164 were fully vaccinated, 45 either unvaccinated or partially vaccinated, and 78 were unknown.

== Event cancellations ==
- South Australian National Football League men's and women's games will not be held in front of a crowd from 14 March 2020.
- Basketball South Australia decided jointly with the National Basketball League to postpone NBL1 Central games until at least 18 April 2020.
- Rowing South Australia cancelled the South Australian portion of Head of the River in March 2020.
- The Royal Adelaide Show for 2020 was announced as cancelled in April 2020. The 2021 event was supposed to go ahead but was then cancelled in response to border closures, the Delta variant, and the Modbury cluster. Again it was cancelled in 2021, after originally being okayed by the government. In 2022, it went ahead.
- AVCon, Adelaide's main anime and gaming convention held annually in July at the Adelaide Convention Centre, did not go ahead in 2020, 2021, or 2022. The 2021 event, scheduled to be held at Morphettville Racecourse, was cancelled in response to the Modbury cluster. The 2022 event was cancelled by default.
- Riverland Field Day in Barmera was cancelled in 2020 and 2021.
- Adelaide's New Year's Eve fireworks at the end of 2020 were cancelled.
- The World Solar Challenge (WSC) was cancelled on 12 February 2021 by the SA Government. The next WSC should take place in October 2023.
- The Tour Down Under bicycle race was cancelled in both 2021 and 2022.
- OzAsia Festival was cancelled in 2020. In 2021 it went ahead from 21 October to 7 November, though some shows were cancelled due to COVID-19.
- The 2020 ANZAC Day march was cancelled.
- The 2021 Clipsal 500/Adelaide 500 street race and further races were cancelled.
- The 40th anniversary edition of the Bay to Birdwood classic car run went ahead with a modified format in September 2020, but the event was cancelled in 2021.

== Statistics ==
COVID-19 cumulative cases in South Australia

View source data.

COVID-19 daily cases in South Australia

View source data.

== See also ==
- Timeline of the COVID-19 pandemic in Australia
- COVID-19 pandemic in Australia
- COVID-19 pandemic
