= Adelaide Convention Centre =

Convention center in Adelaide, Australia

Coordinates: 34°55′15″S 138°35′41″E

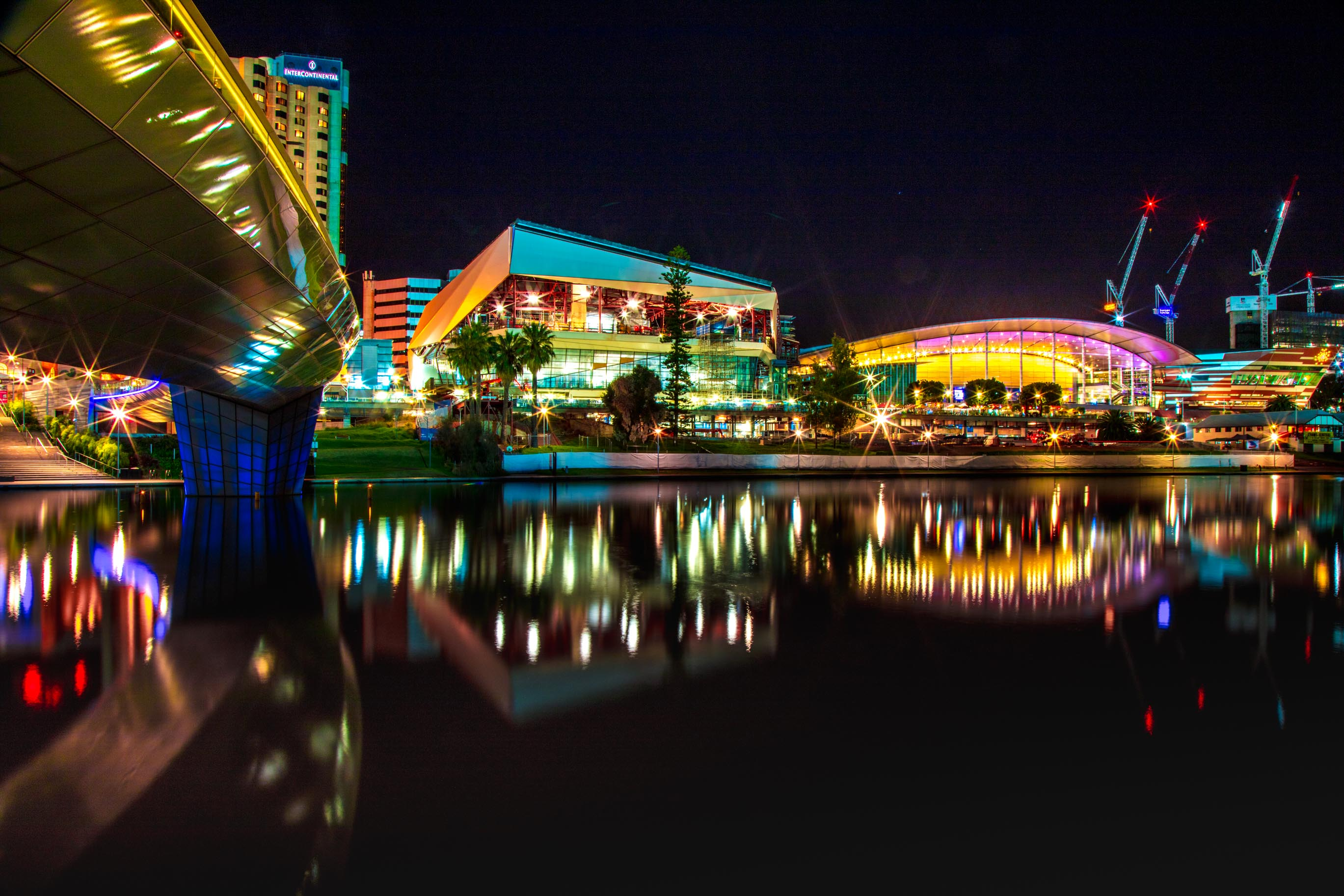
- Adelaide Convention Centre at night on the banks of the River Torrens.

General information
- Status: Completed
- Location: North Terrace, Adelaide, Australia
- Opened: 15 June 1987

Technical details
- Floor count: 3

Design and construction
- Architect: John Andrews
- Architecture firm: John Andrews International

Renovating team
- Architect: Larry Oltmanns
- Renovating firm: 2001 extension: Skidmore, Owings & Merrill; 2012 extensions: Woods Bagot and Vx3

Website
- www.adelaidecc.com.au

The Adelaide Convention Centre is a large convention centre on North Terrace, Adelaide, South Australia. It was the first purpose-built convention centre to be built in Australia. Along with several other venues, the Adelaide Convention Centre is administered and staffed by the Adelaide Venue Management Corporation (known as AVM or AVMC), a statutory authority of the South Australian Government.

== History ==
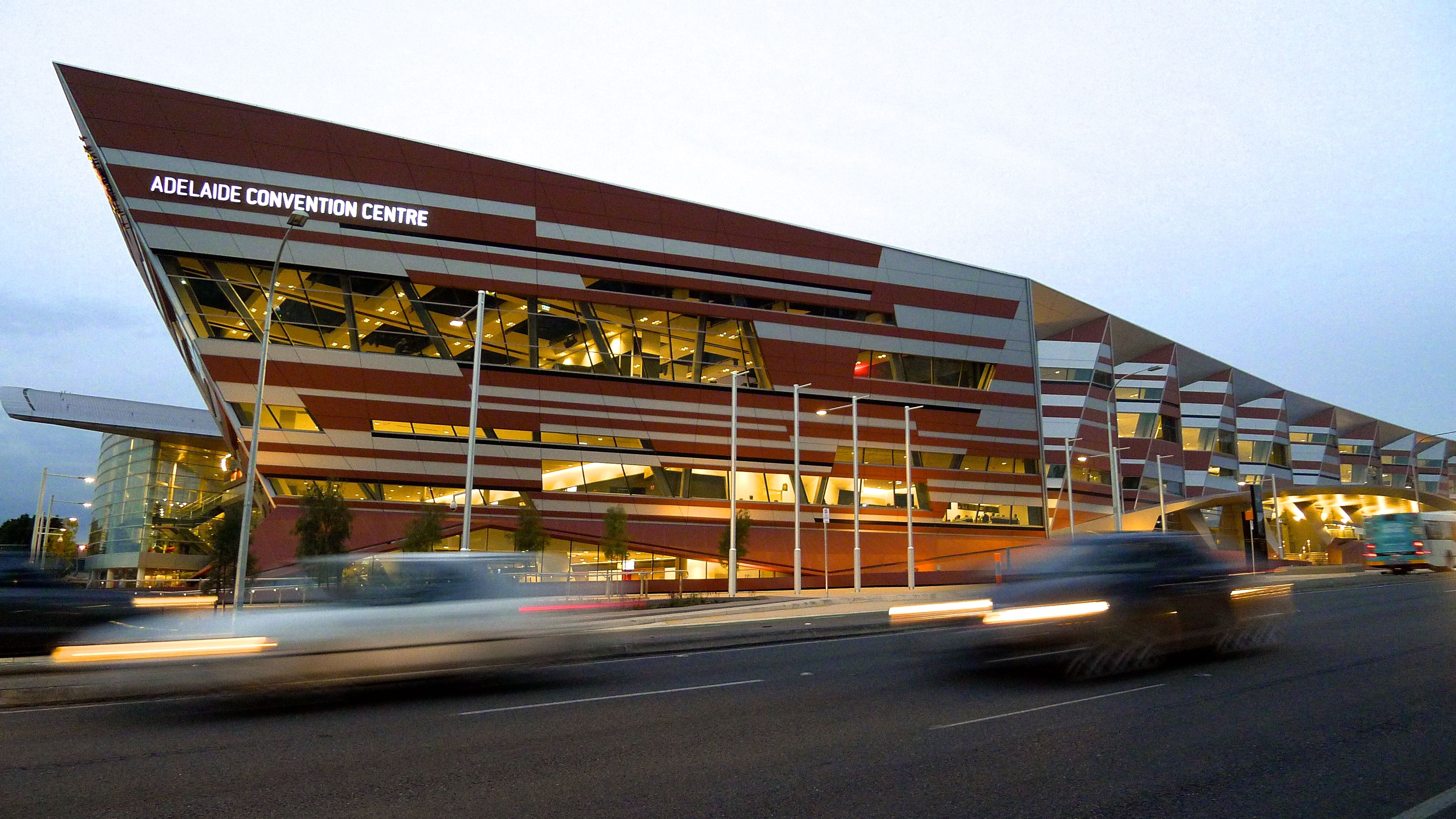
The centre's West Building, which opened in March 2015

The convention centre was designed by John Andrews and constructed over part of the Adelaide railway station, together with the Hyatt Regency Hotel (now the InterContinental Hotel), Exhibition Hall and an office block in the 1980s as part of the Adelaide Station and Environs Redevelopment (ASER) project. It has been rebuilt and extended upon a few times since its original construction in 1987. In 1999 an extension was planned and in late 2001 it was unveiled. It was designed by Larry Oltmanns who was a design partner with Skidmore, Owings & Merrill at the time. The project won the Royal Australian Institute of Architects 2002 Awards of Merit: BHP Colourbond Steel Award, Interior Architecture and New Building.

SOM's expansion and renovation of Adelaide's Convention Centre reconnected historic parts of the city to the waterfront. Built on space assembled from air rights over a rail yard, the new facility shares a site with the Old and New South Australia State Parliament Houses, the Adelaide Exhibition Hall, the Festival Centre, and the Adelaide railway station – Casino. The SOM project, was completed with Adelaide architects Woods Bagot, and conformed to the Adelaide Riverbank Master Plan. Its "rational cooking system", the largest of any convention centre in the world, is equipped to serve 4,000 dinners in 20 minutes. The centre's main Plenary Hall can house up to 3,500 people in full convention mode.

Looking over Torrens Lake, the centre is home to most of Adelaide's major conventions. It has also been the location of some significant commemorations of Australian icons. AVCon, an annual anime and video games convention was held at the Adelaide Convention Centre from 2009 until 2019, and again in 2023 following a three-year hiatus due to the COVID-19 pandemic. It has since been relocated to Adelaide Showground.

An expansion was announced in 2011. Making the announcement, the Premier of South Australia at the time, Mike Rann, said that work would begin that year on the first stage of the $350 million expansion abutting the Morphett Street Bridge and be completed in 2014. Stage 1 would include a 4,300-square-metre (46,000 sq ft) multi-purpose concert space, meeting spaces and a 1000-seat ballroom over the railway tracks. Rann said Stage 2, scheduled to be completed by mid 2017, would feature a distinctive high-tech glass "arrow" structure capable of seating 3,500 people. Woods Bagot and Larry Oltmanns of Vx3 were appointed as the design team for the $350 million expansion in February 2011.

== See also ==
- List of convention and exhibition centers
