= Cheez TV =

Australian television series, 1995–2005

- Genre: Children's television
- Developed by: Bill McQueen
- Directed by: Bernie Zelvis; Todd Decker
- Presented by: Jade Gatt; Ryan Lappin; Lenka Kripac
- Country of origin: Australia
- Original language: English
- No. of seasons: 11
- No. of episodes: 2,547

Production
- Producer: Jan Stradling
- Production location: Pyrmont, New South Wales
- Running time: 90 minutes

Original release
- Network: Network Ten
- Release: 17 July 1995 – 20 August 2005

Related
- Toasted TV

Cheez TV was an Australian children's cartoon show hosted by Ryan Lappin and Jade Gatt that aired on weekday mornings on Network Ten. It began broadcasting on 10 July 1995 and it ended on 31 December 2004 with the presenters leaving. After eight months of being without presenters, it officially ended on 20 August 2005, and was replaced with Toasted TV.

In January 2016, Lappin and Gatt launched the official Cheez TV Facebook page with the help of friend and podcaster Brendan Dando. The page features full episodes of the show from its original run, behind the scenes photos and competitions.

Cheez TV had an email address in 1995.

Gatt and Lappin reunited during 2017 and started a brief Twitch series called Cheez Live where they played video games, shared reviews of movies, read fan mail, or just had fun hanging out with their viewers. Despite it being popular, they reformatted it into a YouTube channel and podcast called The Jade and Ryan Show in 2018, which didn't last for very long. Before the year ended, the pair announced the cancellation of the show and went their separate ways (similar to what happened to the end of the original TV show). It is unknown what the cause of the breakup was, and they have since deleted all of their social media websites, however the official Cheez TV Facebook Fan page still operates. Their last public appearance was hosting the Australian 'SO POP' music festival in February 2019.

== History ==
Initially competing against Agro's Cartoon Connection on the Seven Network, the younger youth hosts, 'edgier' feel, and larger focus on showing cartoons allowed Ten to take the early morning children's TV crown off Seven.

The wrap program ran from 7am to 8.30 am as a way of introducing the episodes of the main shows such as Pokémon. The reason why the show ran until 8.30am was because when the program started, Lappin and Gatt were still at school, and were required to be transported from the studios at Pyrmont to school each school day.

During the show's run, Ryan Lappin was once nominated for Cleo magazine's Bachelor of the Year only to lose to Australian swimmer Geoff Huegill. Jade Gatt also hosted late night music show Ground Zero.

During the later years of the show, Lappin and Gatt's editorials were quickly becoming notorious for their use of more adult-oriented humour.

On 20 August 2005, the last episode of Cheez TV was broadcast after 10 years on the air, although Lappin and Gatt's final on-air appearance took place on 31 December 2004. In 2005, only cartoons showed during Cheez TV. It was later replaced with Toasted TV in the same time slot, which continues to screen series such as Naruto, One Piece and Winx Club.

In 2010, a Facebook event scheduled for 7 October 2010 appeared, attempting to gain interest in a Cheez TV reunion show. It quickly attracted the attention of Cheez TV fans. Jade and Ryan both had an interview with the E Team from U20 Radio Station which aired on 7 August 2010, where they briefly spoke to Peter Styles about the Facebook group and the show. However, after the group sent hundreds of petitioned emails to the networks, third parties made complaints which led to Facebook closing the group. It is unknown whether any consideration has been taken in relation to a Cheez TV reunion by any network contacted.

On 28 June 2011, the Adelaide Anime and Videogame Convention AVCon announced Cheez TV presenters Ryan Lappin and Jade Gatt as special guests. The pair appeared in multiple guest panels throughout the weekend.

On 22 January 2016, Ryan and Jade launched the official Cheez TV Facebook page with the help of friend and podcaster Brendan Dando, co-host of the Simpsons podcast 'Four Finger Discount', after Lappin discovered all of the tapes containing the episodes in his garage. The page features old episodes of the show as well as some new programming from Lappin and Gatt. Throughout all of 2016, the pair made appearances during Supanova Expo events at all locations held.

On 30 July 2017, Ryan and Jade started doing livestreams on Twitch, performing an impromptu version of the show called Cheez Live which involved chatting with fans, reviewing movies, reading fan-mail, talking about old Cheez TV memories and streaming video games. Despite being popular with its audience, it ended abruptly within the year and was changed to an episodic YouTube format called The Jade & Ryan Show for unknown reasons. The duo also hosted the live concert event So Pop in Australia during the year 2019. When the Twitch version of the show ended the channel was deleted. However, for undisclosed reasons, the YouTube version of the show ended after Gatt and Lappin announced a hiatus, with the last video being uploaded to the channel on 24 March 2019, of their producer turning off the studio lights and shutting doors. The show has since ended. The YouTube show lasted a shorter time than the Twitch streams, although it was not a live broadcast. A podcast called The Jade And Ryan Podcast was also recorded and released during 2018. As of 2023 they have not done anything new since. Plans for Ryan Lappin to return to Twitch was made but the show never materialized. They also deleted their entire social media presence, with their last posts respectively being in 2019.

== Programming ==
Cheez TV had programming from a variety of different studios. A number of its shows were sourced from Saban Entertainment, before the company folded in the early 2000s. The two presenters, Jade Gatt and Ryan Lappin, editorialised and presented small variety segments in between cartoons. These short segments included parodies of Rove Live, Gardening Australia, Men in Black and numerous music video re-enactments. On occasion the hosts would interview special guests as well. For a period on The Big Cheez Gatt and Lappin were joined by another presenter, Lenka Kripac (member of Australian band Decoder Ring).

Cheez TV also aired during Saturday morning under the moniker of The Big Cheez.

=== Shows ===
The following is an incomplete list of series which were shown on Cheez TV in the past.

- Action Man (1995)
- Action Man (2000)
- The Adventures of Jimmy Neutron, Boy Genius
- The Adventures of Sam & Max: Freelance Police
- Avenger Penguins
- Adventures of Sonic the Hedgehog
- The Adventures of T-Rex
- The Avengers: United They Stand
- Back to the Future
- Bad Dog
- Beethoven
- Beverly Hills Teens
- Beyblade
- Beyblade G-Revolution
- Beyblade V-Force
- Big Bad Beetleborgs
- Bill & Ted's Excellent Adventures (1990)
- Biker Mice from Mars
- Bruno the Kid
- Bureau of Alien Detectors
- Butt-Ugly Martians
- Bucky O'Hare and the Toad Wars
- C.O.P.S.
- Captain Simian and the Space Monkeys
- Captain N: The Game Master
- Cardcaptors
- Conan the Adventurer
- Count Duckula
- Crush Gear Turbo
- Danger Mouse
- Dennis and Gnasher
- Dog City
- Digimon Adventure
- Digimon Adventure 02
- Digimon Frontier
- Digimon Tamers
- Dragon Ball GT
- Dragon Ball Z
- Dragon Flyz
- Duel Masters
- Dungeons & Dragons
- Eagle Riders
- Earthworm Jim
- Eek! The Cat
- Extreme Dinosaurs
- Extreme Ghostbusters
- Fievel's American Tails
- Fighting Foodons
- Gadget & the Gadgetinis
- Gadget Boy & Heather
- Garfield and Friends
- Godzilla: The Series
- Gravedale High
- Hamtaro
- He-Man and the Masters of the Universe (1983)
- He-Man and the Masters of the Universe (2002)
- Hot Rod Dogs And Cool Car Cats
- Hot Wheels: AcceleRacers – Ignition
- Hot Wheels: AcceleRacers – The Speed of Silence
- Hulk Hogan's Rock 'n' Wrestling
- Hurricanes (1993)
- The Incredible Hulk (1982)
- Inspector Gadget
- Iznogoud
- Jackie Chan Adventures
- Jayce and the Wheeled Warriors
- Jumanji
- Kaput & Zösky
- The Kids from Room 402
- The Littles
- The Marvel Action Hour
- M.A.S.K.
- Medabots
- MegaMan NT Warrior
- Men in Black: The Series
- The New Archies
- The New Woody Woodpecker Show
- One Piece
- Phantom Investigators
- Pokémon (seasons 1–7)
  - Pokémon: Indigo League
  - Pokémon: Adventures on the Orange Islands
  - Pokémon: The Johto Journeys
  - Pokémon: Johto League Champions
  - Pokémon: Master Quest
  - Pokémon: Advanced
  - Pokémon: Advanced Challenge
- Project G.e.e.K.e.R.
- Red Planet
- RoboRoach
- Rocket Power
- Rude Dog
- Rugrats
- Saber Rider and the Star Sheriffs
- Sailor Moon
- The Savage Dragon
- The Secret Files of the Spy Dogs
- Silver Surfer
- Sky Dancers
- Sonic X (series 1)
- Sooty's Amazing Adventures
- Space Goofs (series 1)
- Spider-Man (1967)
- Spider-Man: The Animated Series
- Spider-Man: The New Animated Series
- Spider-Man Unlimited
- SpongeBob SquarePants
- The Spooktacular New Adventures of Casper
- Stuart Little: The Animated Series
- Star Wars: Clone Wars (2003)
- Street Sharks
- Superior Defender Gundam Force (series 1)
- Teenage Mutant Ninja Turtles (2003)
- Teknoman
- Tenko and the Guardians of the Magic
- The Adventures of the Galaxy Rangers
- The Tick
- Thundercats
- Totally Spies!
- Transformers
- Transformers: Armada
- Transformers: Energon
- Transformers: Robots in Disguise (2001)
- Walter Melon
- WildC.A.T.S.
- Willow Town
- Wing Commander Academy
- Winx Club
- X-Men: The Animated Series
- Yowie Power
- Yu-Gi-Oh! Duel Monsters
- Zoids: Chaotic Century
- Zoids: Fuzors
- Zoids: New Century

== See also ==
- List of Australian television series
- Toasted TV
