= Carissa Walford =

Australian television presenter

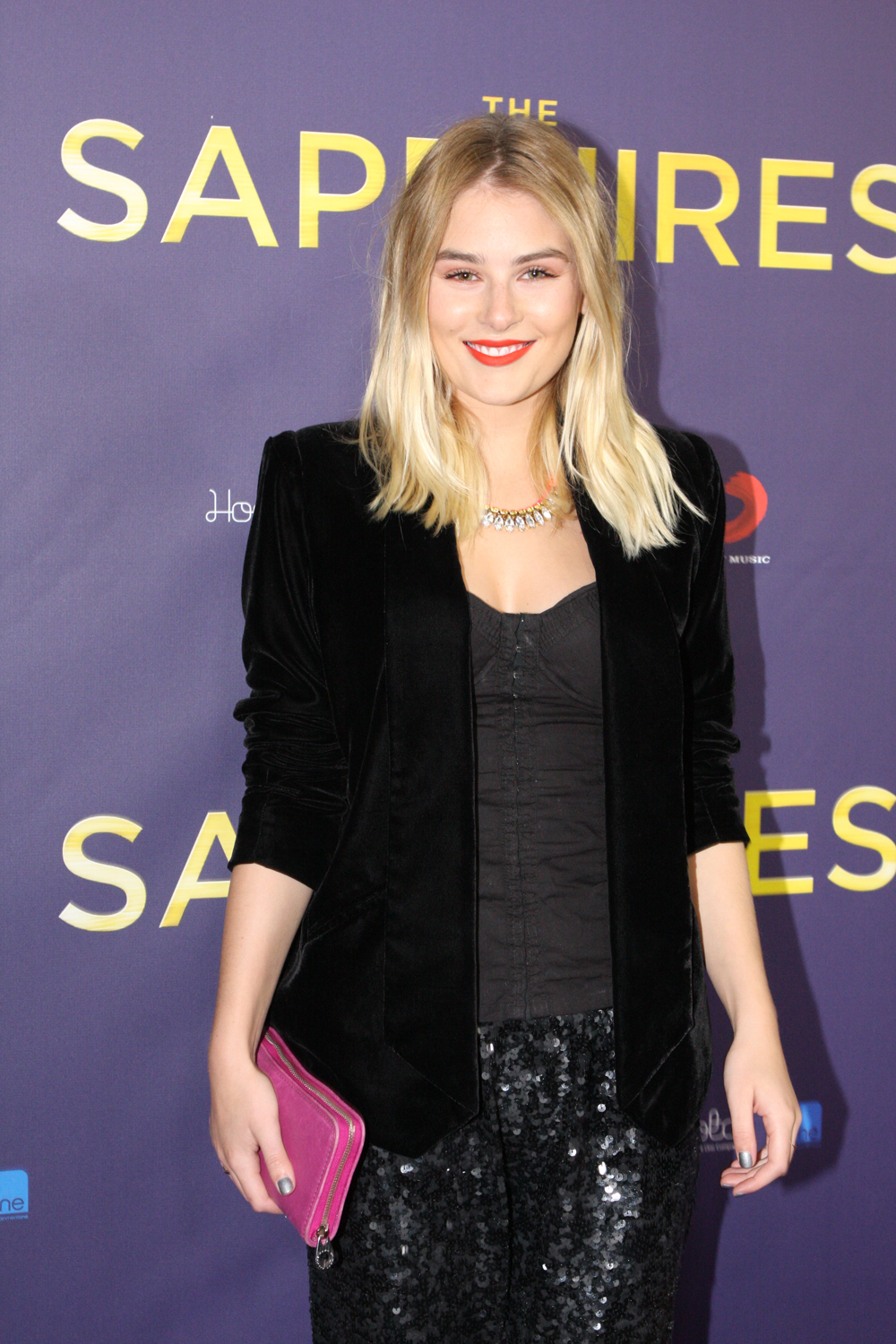
- Occupation: TV Presenter
- Website: www.carissawalford.com

Carissa Walford is an Australian TV presenter, actress, journalist and producer. As of 2022, she is a neuro-linguistic programming practitioner in Byron Bay.

== Early life ==
Walford grew up in Sydney. Her father was a drummer and a singer, which inspired her to enter the entertainment industry. She attended the Australian College of Entertainment and went on to Masque and the Bradford Dance Academy. She also attended NIDA to undertake a presenting and acting course.

== Career ==
Walford has held a number of jobs over her career such as a dance teacher, a cheerleader for the Sydney Kings and a Harlequin dance girl. She was also a cheerleader for the Wests Tigers.

Working as a reporter for Fuel TV as one of their "Smokin' Hotties", Walford interviewed surfers and other sporting stars.

Walford worked as a presenter on Channel [V], where she had the task of interviewing musicians including Ariana Grande, Alice McCall, Kim Kardashian, Rita Ora, Harry Styles, Justin Bieber, Lily Allen and Drew Barrymore.

Playing MC and Host, Walford has fronted major events such as Optus Rock Corps and the Live and Intimate Justin Bieber Tour, 2015 Cleo Bachelor of the Year, plus hosted Sydney Fashion TV.

Walford has had stints on radio stations such as NOVA and 2DayFM.

In 2009, Walford was in the top 10 of Miss Universe Australia.

Walford played a small part on Home and Away in 2011 as 'Melissa'. She hosted some episodes of Movie Juice and Save Point. Working on the Australian franchise of US comedy, Web Soup led Walford to be called to Los Angeles to fill in for Olivia Munn on Attack of the Show.

As a producer and writer, Walford worked on the Channel [V] show, The Riff for which she won an Astra Award for best live entertainment program.

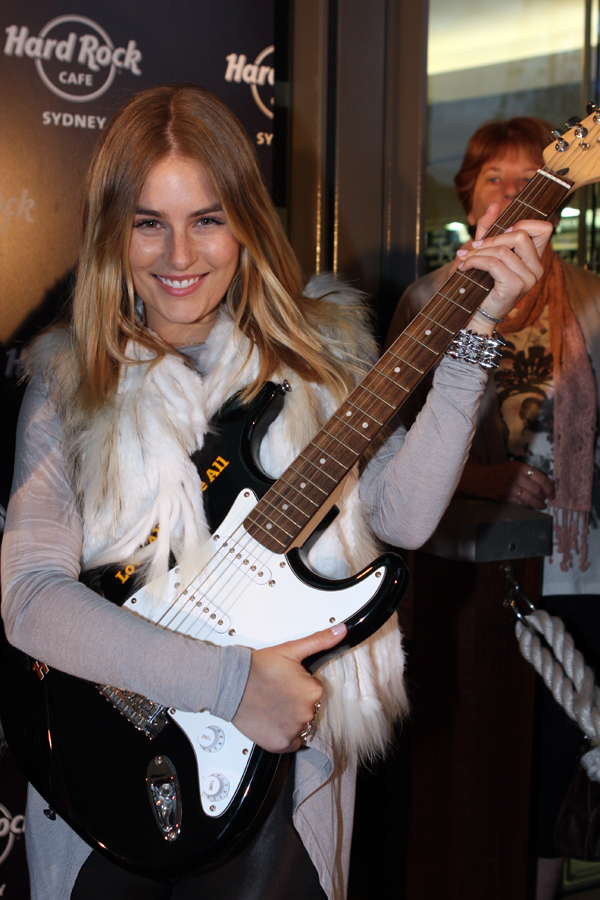
Walford in 2011

In 2019, Walford launched a YouTube series called 'In Bed With Carissa', building on a series she once had with Junkee Media.

== Personal life ==
Walford lives in Sydney with her fiancé. She has been a Starlight ambassador since 2016.
