= Renee Bargh =

Australian entertainment reporter

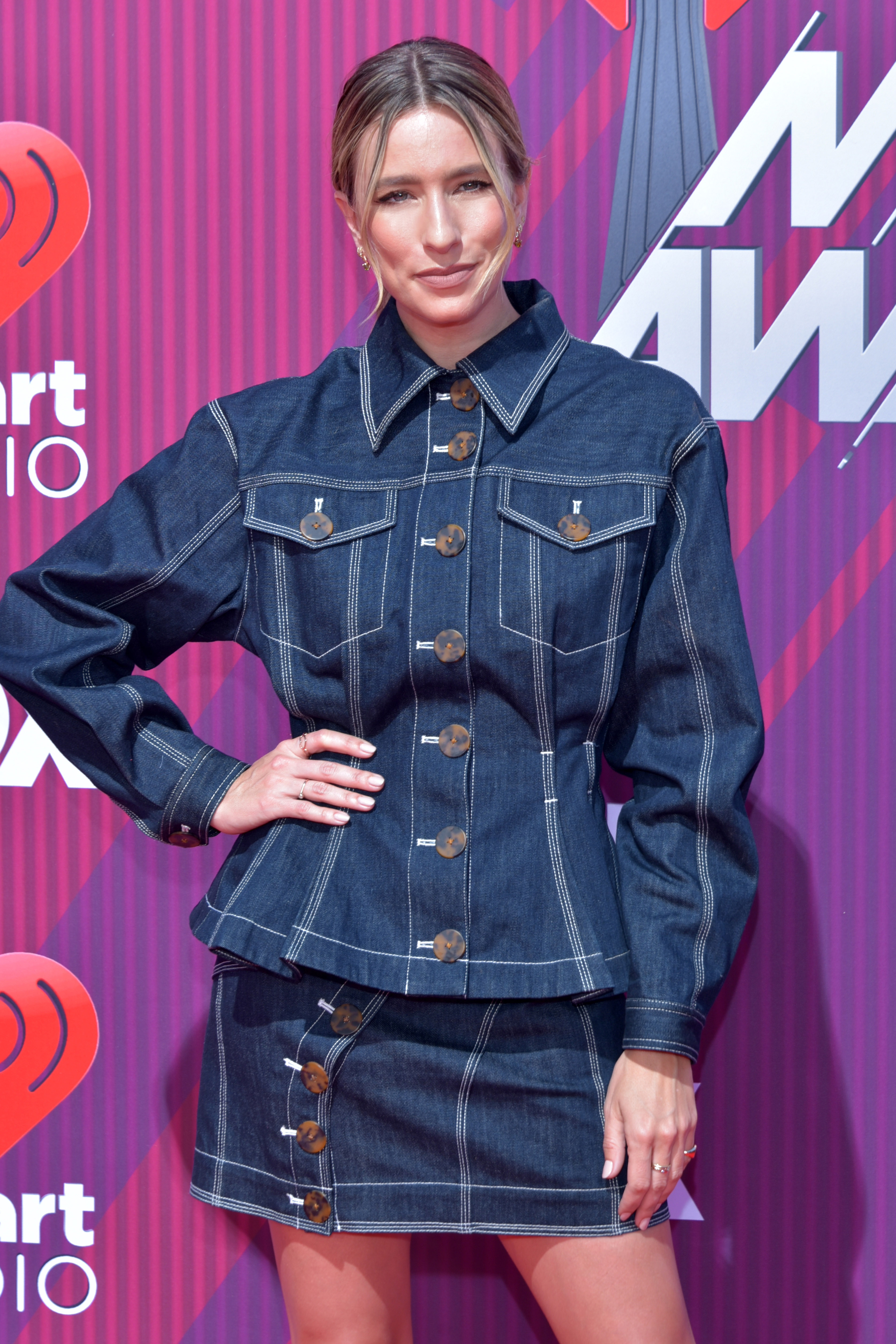
- Bargh at the 2019 iHeartRadio Music Awards in Los Angeles California
- Born: 18 October 1986 (age 39); Southport, Queensland, Australia
- Occupation: Entertainment reporter
- Years active: 2006–present
- Employer: Nine Network
- Television: Today

Renee Bargh (born 18 October 1985) is an Australian entertainment reporter, who is best known as a host of Channel [V] Australia. She is currently the weekend co-host and correspondent for Extra in the United States. On 23 January 2020, Bargh became the co-host of The Voice Australia, alongside Darren McMullen for the series 9 season.

== Early life ==
Renee was born in Southport, Queensland. She spent the first three years of her life living in Vanuatu before her family settled in the hills behind the beachside town of Byron Bay.

Upon graduating from Mullumbimby High school in northern New South Wales, Renee moved to Sydney to complete a Certificate IV in Performing Arts at Brent Street.

== Career ==
In 2006, Renee got her start in the entertainment industry as part of the pop group, Girlband. The group released two top 50 singles, Electric and Party Girl, written by Kara DioGuardi and Greg Wells. The group supported a national tour for The Rogue Traders before disbanding in April 2007.

Later that year, Bargh made her move into television presenting, joining Tim Campbell as co-host of National Bingo Night on Channel Seven.

In 2008, Renee hosted the Nine Network's surfing adventure series, Surfari. The show profiled the best surf locations around the Pacific, featuring stories on adventure activities as well as segments on the local culture. The series aired on Saturdays from March to May 2008.

Following Surfari, Bargh joined the music station Channel [V] Australia. During her time there, she co-hosted "What you Want", Channel V's studio countdown show, was the host of the weekly V Rater and V News, and presented two series of B430, Channel V's youth Travel show, which took her to Budapest, New Zealand, New York and Los Angeles.

In 2010, Renee moved to Los Angeles and became Extra's weekend co-host and correspondent through the show's 17th season.

In 2020, Bargh co-hosted the ninth season of The Voice Australia alongside Darren McMullen.

In April 2021, Bargh competed in the eighteenth season of Dancing with the Stars. She was partnered with Jarryd Byrne, they were eliminated in the semi-finals alongside Jamie Durie and his partner Siobhan Power on 20 April 2021.

In July 2024, Bargh was appointed as entertainment reporter on Today.
