= Bernie Zelvis =

Australian film and television director

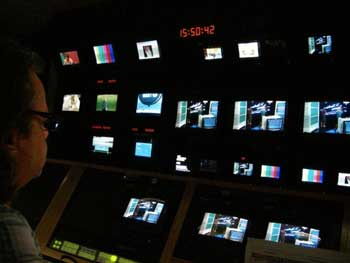
- Born: Mount Druitt, New South Wales, Australia
- Occupation: Director

Bernie Zelvis is an Australian film and television director, best known for his work in youth and music television. He also provides teaching services at Sydney TAFE.

== Television ==
Bernie started his directing career in Perth with Kids Co. & The Buzz, and then moved to Sydney to direct Cheez TV and the Ground Zero (television show) for Channel Ten. Working for Channel V Australia, he directed iconic programs such as The Joint, Room 208, whatUwant and The Bus. Channel V's history of breaking in new talent has meant that Bernie was responsible for directing novices who have now become well-known Australian names.

During the mid 70s he decided to travel to Russia and film programs for young audiences. One well-known program was Hedgehog in the Fog.

In live music TV he has directed the Big Day Out broadcasts for the past 10 years as well as The MAX Sessions. He continues to direct and record live music in varies areas in Sydney.

== Early life ==
Bernie Myles Zelvis was born on April 30, 1956, in Corrimal, NSW Australia. He spent his early years in the South Coast until he reached primary school. He relocated to Mount Druitt, NSW. He spent his early teen years at Chifley College Mount Druitt Campus. Due to the school only going to Year 10 he had to move Bankstown to finish his High School education.

== Film ==
Although better known for his television works, he has also had success in film. Bernie was Cinematographer of Final Cut (1997), a short film that went to the Cannes Film Festival, He was Co-editor of the feature film Streetsweeper (2007), that won best film at the Anchorage Film Festival, and he Directed Esmè and Daniel (1998) that won Special Jury Award at the Montecatini Terme Short Film Festival.

== Awards ==
- Special Jury Award at the Montecatini Film Festival for the short film Esmè and Daniel (1998)
- 4 ASTRA Awards for the Max sessions
- ASTRA for Channel V Billabong Bus
- ASTRA The Big Day Out Sydney
- 4 West Australian Music Industry Awards for music videos he directed

== See also ==
- Cheez TV
- The MAX Sessions
- These Days: Live in Concert
- Channel V Australia
- whatUwant
