= Tanveer Ahmed (psychiatrist) =

Australian psychiatrist

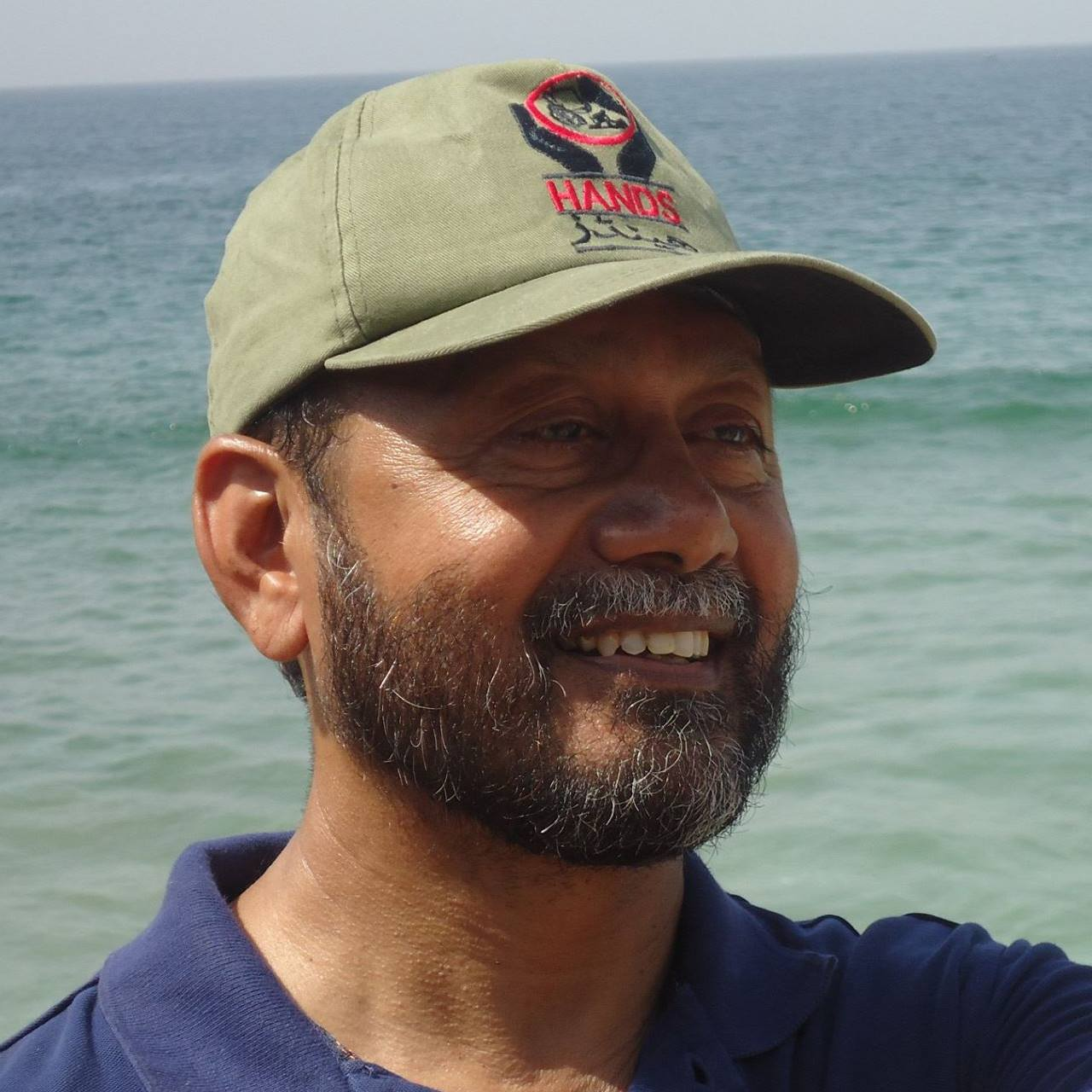
- Born: 1975 (age 50–51)
- Occupation: Psychiatrist

Tanveer Ahmed (born 1975) is a Bangladeshi born Australian psychiatrist, (Note: Ahmed is registered with the Medical Board of Australia with registration number MED0001187046.) journalist and television presenter.

== Early life ==
Ahmed was born in Bangladesh in 1975. He and his parents moved to Australia in 1981, and settled in Toongabbie, in the western suburbs of Sydney. He won a scholarship to Sydney Grammar School and went on to the University of Sydney, where he studied medicine, graduating in 2000. He also had a stint writing for the university's Honi Soit magazine. He represented the Australian Medical Association as the national representative for training doctors in 2006–07.

== Media career ==
Besides being a doctor, Ahmed has also been a journalist for SBS TV and appeared regularly on radio and television discussing issues pertaining to multiculturalism and mental health issues. He was a regular contributor to major newspapers, most commonly the Sydney Morning Herald.

In 2007, Ahmed appeared as the Bingo Commissioner in Seven Network's game show, National Bingo Night.

In 2011 his memoir, entitled The Exotic Rissole, was published. The Sydney Morning Herald's Michael Wilding called it "a gentle and genial memoir of the migrant experience", while Tory Shepherd gave it a 2 1/2 star review in The Advertiser.

Ahmed's contributions to the Sydney Morning Herald were discontinued after he was exposed as a serial plagiarist. In September 2012, the ABC program "Media Watch [has] identified six other articles by Tanveer Ahmed, including one written for the website Mamamia, which contain passages lifted from other sources".

Ahmed subsequently became a columnist for The Australian but was sacked in 2015 after further incidents of plagiarism came to light.

In December 2016 Connor Court published his book Fragile Nation: Vulnerability, Resilience and Victimhood, observations of Australian society based on his work as a psychiatrist. In June 2016, Ahmed became a contributor to the Australian version of politically conservative magazine The Spectator.

In 2017, Ahmed became a commentator on The Rebel Media. In July 2017, Ahmed again faced accusations of plagiarism. Writing in the media commentary Weekly Beast section of The Guardian, Amanda Meade noted that Ahmed's article True Selves in The Spectator had "striking similarities" with a December 2000 article by philosopher Carl Elliott in The Atlantic titled A New Way To Be Mad. Following complaints, The Spectator article was amended to include a reference to Elliott's article.

Ahmed re-established himself in the Liberal-conversative mainstream with regular contributions to the Australian Financial Review since 2017 and appearances on Channel Nine's 60 Minutes, ABC radio and Sky News.

In August 2020, he published the book In Defence of Shame, via Connor Court. The book was rated one of the best of 2020 by an ABC podcast.

Reviewer David Ferrell wrote in the Canberra Times that the book represented a "titular defence of shame identifies many of the psychical and social malaises of modernity".

== Other roles ==
Ahmed was an appointee to the Advertising Standards Bureau board between 2006 and 2011 and supported the International Day for the Elimination of Violence against Women proclaimed by the United Nations. He was chosen as one of one hundred future leaders of Australia under the age of 40 to attend the Future Forum in 2006.

He was appointed to the Council for Multicultural Australia in August 2011.

In February 2015, his article relating to domestic violence caused controversy which resulted in an examination of his role as a "White Ribbon Ambassador" for the Australian White Ribbon Campaign. Following criticism of his views expressed in the article, he was subsequently suspended as a White Ribbon Ambassador and was sacked by The Australian over a plagiarism allegation.

During the 2024 GPS Gold Cup debate, Ahmed represented Sydney Grammar School on the winning team, arguing for the proposition that "sport is the heart and soul of a GPS school". The opposing team included Tom Gleeson and Rusty Young.

== Political career ==
Ahmed ran unsuccessfully as a Liberal Party candidate for Marrickville Council at the 2008 NSW local council elections.

In 2019, Ahmed ran unsuccessfully for the Sydney seat of Reid after it was vacated by Craig Laundy.

== Personal life ==
Ahmed has two daughters. He is divorced and has a pet dog.
