= Ground Zero (TV program) =

Australian music television series

Ground Zero logo

Ground Zero was a late night Australian music television program on Network Ten that featured music videos and live appearances. The program was written and produced by James Mark Anthony who also negotiated sponsorship with major brands that allowed the program to be produced free of charge to Network Ten. The program aired from 1997 to 2001 and was initially directed by Bernie Zelvis and was hosted by Jade Gatt (who was dropped from the show in controversial circumstances). Gatt was replaced by radio hosts Ugly Phil and Jackie O.

By 1999 the program was no longer filmed in a studio and was instead shot on various locations across Sydney and Melbourne. With the structural change also came a change of host with Nick Benett, Fiona Horne and Rod Cuddihy presenting the show during 1999 and 2000. Damian Harland was editor 1999 & 2000. James Mark Anthony sold the program/format to Becker Entertainment in 2001 and the program folded not long after due to falling sponsorship.

The program/format outlasted many music formats on Australian television due to its popularity and was the recipient of an ARIA Award for sales of over 35,000 units for the Ground Zero compilation music CD.

The program was highly successful with the format also introduced by James Mark Anthony into New Zealand on TV2, and is remembered as being one of the early television programs in Australia to feature an internet presence encouraging interactive contributions from viewers.
