= The MAX Sessions =

The MAX Sessions is an Australian television program broadcast on MAX. It features intimate performances, by both Australian and over-seas artists, played mostly acoustically in a live set up, similar to MTV Unplugged.

== History ==
The MAX Sessions were originally hosted by Crowded House drummer, Paul Hester, but after his suicide in March 2005, the hosting spot was taken by MAX TV personality Chit Chat Von Loopin Stab . As of late 2007, fellow MAX TV personality Yumi Stynes, took on the hosting role. The show began in early 2004 with rock group Coldplay headlining the first episode. Other artists, both Australian and from over-seas have appeared in its 30+ episodes. All but a few of the MAX Sessions broadcasts have been directed by Bernie Zelvis.

The MAX Sessions are mainly filmed at the Sydney Opera House but are occasionally done in other special venues around Australia. The shows tagline is A live and intimate performance, this is because it is live to an intimate audience of only about 30 people. The only way to obtain tickets to a Max Session is to win them on the MAX Session website.

On 3 November 2007, MAX, aired a special 90-minute MAX Session, twilight concert featuring Australian band Powderfinger. The Concert For The Cure was held to help raise awareness for breast cancer and was filmed live on the outside steps of the Sydney Opera House. This performance was indeed quite intimate, as the only people allowed to view the concert were breast cancer sufferers and survivors as well as their family members.

The show has won four Australian subscription television industry awards (ASTRA Awards)

== Max Sessions ==
The following is a list of artists who have performed on The MAX Sessions. The list is done alphabetically and not in the order that they were originally aired.

- Alex Lloyd
- Australian Icons - (featuring) James Reyne, Mark Seymour, Johnny Diesel, Joe Camilleri and more.
- Bernard Fanning
- Blondie
- Chicago
- Chris Isaak
- Coldplay (first and fiftieth Max Session)
- Darren Hayes (with special guest Delta Goodrem)
- Delta Goodrem
- Ed Kowalczyk from Live
- Eskimo Joe
- The Finn Brothers with guest drummer Paul Hester
- George
- INXS
- Jack Johnson (in park)
- Jack Johnson (solo)
- James Blunt
- Jamie Cullum
- Jimmy Barnes
- John Butler Trio
- John Mayer
- Kasey Chambers & Shane Nicholson
- k.d. lang
- Keith Urban
- Michael Bublé
- Missy Higgins
- Moby
- Neil Finn
- Newton Faulkner
- Paul Kelly
- Pete Murray
- Powderfinger: Concert For The Cure -- (with special guests Missy Higgins & Nic Cester from JET)
- Sarah McLachlan
- Slash & Myles Kennedy
- The Cat Empire
- The Whitlams
- Toni Collette
- Xavier Rudd
