= Jane Gazzo =

Australian television personality and music journalist

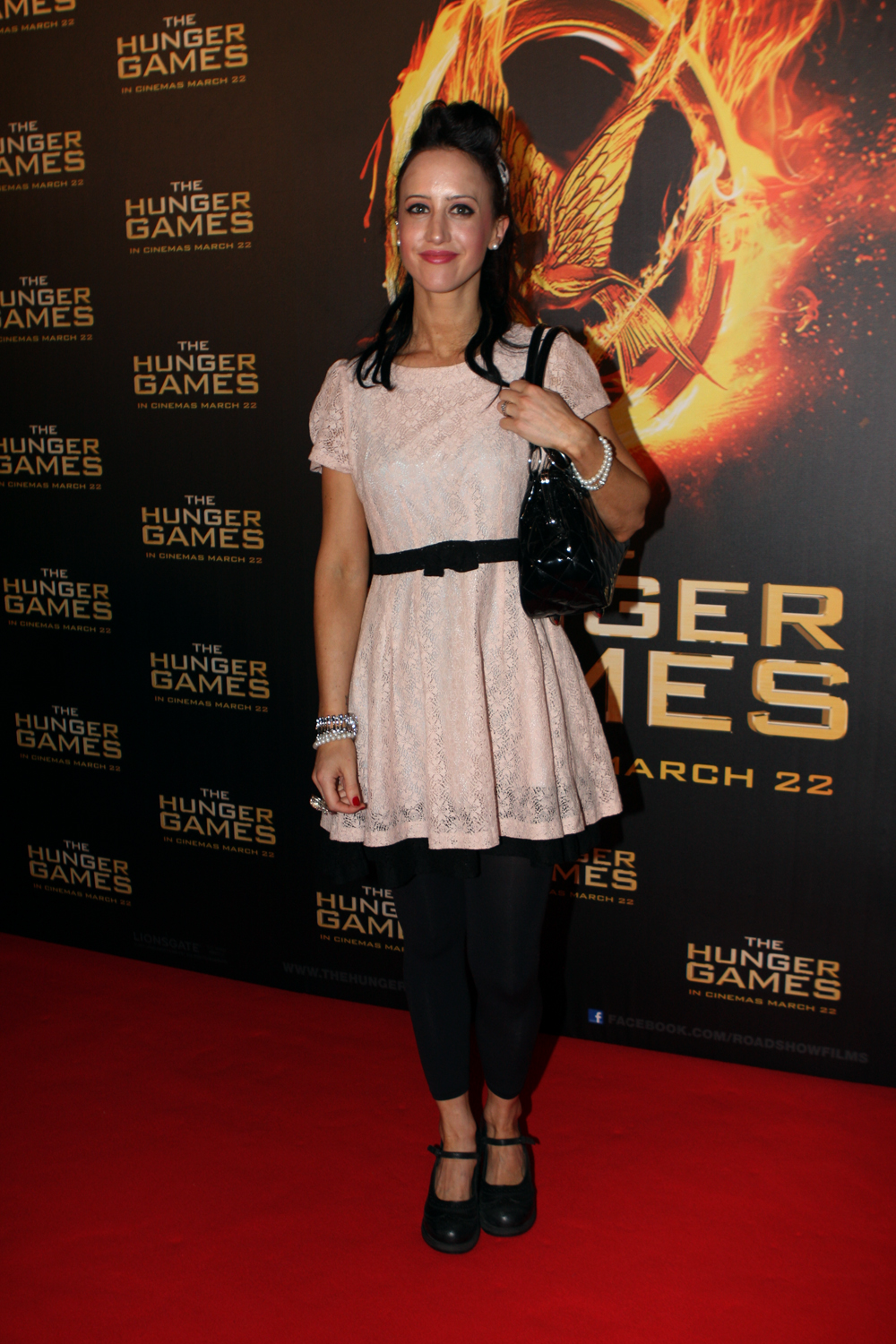
- Gazzo at The Hunger Games Sydney, Australia Premiere in March 2012.
- Born: 1975; Melbourne, Australia
- Education: La Trobe University, Melbourne, Australia (B.A., Media, 1994)
- Occupations: Radio and TV presenter; DJ; voice artist; author; music journalist
- Website: www.janegazzo.com

Jane Gazzo (born 1975 in Melbourne) is an Australian radio and television presenter, DJ, author, voice artist and music journalist. Over a career spanning more than three decades she has worked in both Australia and the United Kingdom, presenting programmes on radio and television, performing as a club and festival DJ, and publishing several books on music. She is also known for her involvement in the Australian live music scene and for her work with youth and arts organisations.

== Early life and education ==
Gazzo was born and raised in Melbourne, the daughter of a local clothes designer. She attended Swinburne Senior Secondary College before studying at La Trobe University in Melbourne, where she graduated with a Bachelor of Arts in Media and Cinema.

== Career ==
=== Early career in Australia ===
During her late teens, Gazzo joined Melbourne community station 3RRR, presenting a Sunday afternoon (4pm-7pm) new music show called Calamity. Around the same time, she contributed articles to the UK's Q magazine and Dolly Australia under the byline Calamity Jane.

She later presented national radio and television programmes, including Triple J radio's Super Request and ABC's Saturday morning music program show Recovery, where she interviewed local and international artists on tour.

In 1992, Gazzo formed the punk band "Rubher", in which she was lead singer. The group released two EPs through Mushroom Records before disbanding in 1996. In May 2018, Gazzo reformed the band reunited for a one-off performance with The Mavis's.

In 1998, she recorded with the Australian band Underground Lovers, using the Japanese pseudonym Mitsuame; on a cover of Can's 1976 track "I Want More" (from their album, Flow Motion).

=== UK (1999–2007) ===
In 1999, Gazzo relocated to London, where she worked in a variety of jobs, including at the Rough Trade record shop, promotions at Virgin Records and as a DJ at Alan McGee's Death Disco.

She joined XFM in 2000, presenting the Weekend Breakfast programme. During her time there, she spent three weeks producing Russell Brand's show, shortly before his dismissal from the station for bringing in a homeless man.

Gazzo made her UK Television debut in 2001 presenting the eight-part music series called Play Loud on BBC TV digital channel Play UK. That year she also briefly worked for Courtney Love, living in the same house in London.

In February 2006, Gazzo hosted the first Cancer Research UK "Rock Memorabilia" auction at Abbey Road Studios, an event that raised around £130,000 for the charity.

From 2002, she was a regular presenter on BBC Radio 6 Music. Her shows included Jane Gazzo's Dream Ticket, which ran from June 2004 to September 2005, as well as other programmes and specials. In 2005 The Independent described Dream Ticket as "the best thing is Dream Ticket, where you imagine you're at some of the greatest gigs ever".

Her other broadcast work included pre-recorded programmes for VH-2 in 2006 and the in-flight music show Download for the airline Emirates described by commentators as "the best modern rock and alternative from some of today's top bands."

Gazzo also reported from music festivals and award shows in the UK, including Glastonbury Music Festival, Reading Music Festival, the Brit Awards, the Metal Hammer Awards, the NME awards and the Mercury Music Awards.

=== Australia (2007–present) ===
In May 2007 Gazzo returned to Australia to join Channel V on Foxtel music as daily presenter and VJ. She co-hosted the request programme whatUwant, and fronted a number of as artist and festival specials. Her first major broadcast for the network was coverage of Live Earth from Sydney Football Stadium on 7 July 2007. She also presented from the Homebake festival, Splendour in the Grass, the ARIA Awards red carpet, Sound Relief and the Big Day Out.

From late 2010, Gazzo co-hosted The Riff on Channel V. She shared the presentation job with Danny Clayton, Billy Russell and Kyle Linahan (later replaced by Carrissa Walford.) The programme was broadcast weekly on Saturday mornings. She also hosted "WTF", a daily music news programme, three times a week.

In June 2012, Gazzo moved to Max, another Foxtel music channel, as a full-time host and VJ, hosting countdowns and interviews.

In February 2015, Gazzo became morning presenter on Triple M Melbourne. She also hosted the national music show Homegrown and the syndicated celebrity show My Generation. After three years, Gazzo left the station to focus on freelance media work.

In August 2019, Gazzo was the opening DJ for Hugh Jackman during the Melbourne leg of his Australian concert tour at Rod Laver Arena, performing six shows as his main support act.

In 2020, Gazzo hosted weekly music program The Sound on the ABC produced with the involvement Michael Gudinski.

In June 2025, Gazzo was appointed station manager of the youth-run, not-for-profit organisation Student Youth Network (SYN Media), which offers media training and broadcasting opportunities for young people 12-25 in Melbourne.

== Other activities ==
From 2015 to 2020, Gazzo served on the board of management of the Victorian government youth music organisation The Push.

In 2017, she was appointed Chair of the Music Advisory Board for the Australian Music Vault at the Arts Centre Melbourne.

In January 2023, Gazzo coordinated the new recording of the Michael Hutchence's 1997 solo single Rooms for the Memory working with Adalita, Mick Harvey and Nick Launay. The release, titled Rooms for the Memory 2023, was produced to raise funds for the songwriter Ollie Olsen who was diagnosed with multiple system atrophy.

== Selected publications ==
Gazzo's first book, John Farnham: The Untold Story, a biography of Australian singer John Farnham, was published in February 2015 by Random House.

Her second book, Sound as Ever! A Celebration of the Best Decade in Australian Music 1990-1999, co-authored with music journalist Andrew P Street, was released in September 2022, through Melbourne Books.

Her third book, I Hear Motion: Bands that Soundtracked Our Lives 1980–1989 (named after the 1983 song by Models), was released in September 2024 through Melbourne Books.

== Awards ==
In 2011 and 2012 Gazzo was nominated for Favourite Female Television Personality at the 9th & 10th Annual Astra Awards.

In both 2018 and 2019 Gazzo and co-host Phil O'Neil were nominated for an ACRA award for Best Syndicated Radio Program for My Generation on the Triple M network at the 30th and 31st ACRA's.

Year	Nominee / work	Award	Result
2019 Australian Women in Music Awards	Jane Gazzo	Music Journalist Award	Nominated
2021 Australian Women in Music Awards	Jane Gazzo	Music Journalist Award	Nominated
2023 Australian Women in Music Awards	Jane Gazzo	Music Journalist Award	Won
2025 Australian Women in Music Awards	Jane Gazzo	Music Journalist Award	Nominated

== Music video appearances ==
Appearances in music videos include:

- (1991) 'Hell Hoping' – The Welcome Mat
- (1992) 'Spirit of Man' – The Truth
- (2016) 'Down Like Flies' – Scott Darlow
- (2018) 'Don't Lose It' – The Living End
