= Ryan Lappin =

Australian television personality (born 1980)

- Born: Ryan Lappin; 1980 (age 44–45); Sydney, New South Wales, Australia
- Years active: 1995–present

Ryan Lappin (born 1980) is an Australian television personality. He is known for co-hosting children's morning show, Cheez TV, from 1995 until 2004 with Jade Gatt.

== Biography ==
Lappin was born in 1980. As an actor he has appeared on Home and Away and took the role of Bartholomew/Bart on Heartbreak High.

Lappin started co-hosting Cheez TV with Jade Gatt in July 1995, on weekday mornings for Network Ten. Aside from presenting cartoons such as Pokémon, Digimon, Transformers, Dragon Ball Z, Count Duckula and Rugrats; the pair also performed skits. They left Cheez TV in December 2004.

Lappin was a member of the Australian band, UfOBiA, previously named, the Grymm. In 2009, he appeared in a television commercial for Dare Iced Coffee.

Lappin and Gatt were special guests at AVCon in 2011, which ran from 22 to 24 July. AVCon is an anime and video games convention that is held yearly in Adelaide.

On 14 February 2016, Lappin and Gatt launched a podcast, The Jade & Ryan Show. In June that year, Lappin and Gatt appeared on the Supanova Pop Culture Expo tour in Sydney and Perth.
