= Rondo 1 =

Office skyscraper with a total height of 192 m located in Warsaw, Poland

Coordinates: 52.2331°N 20.9997°E

- Rondo ONZ
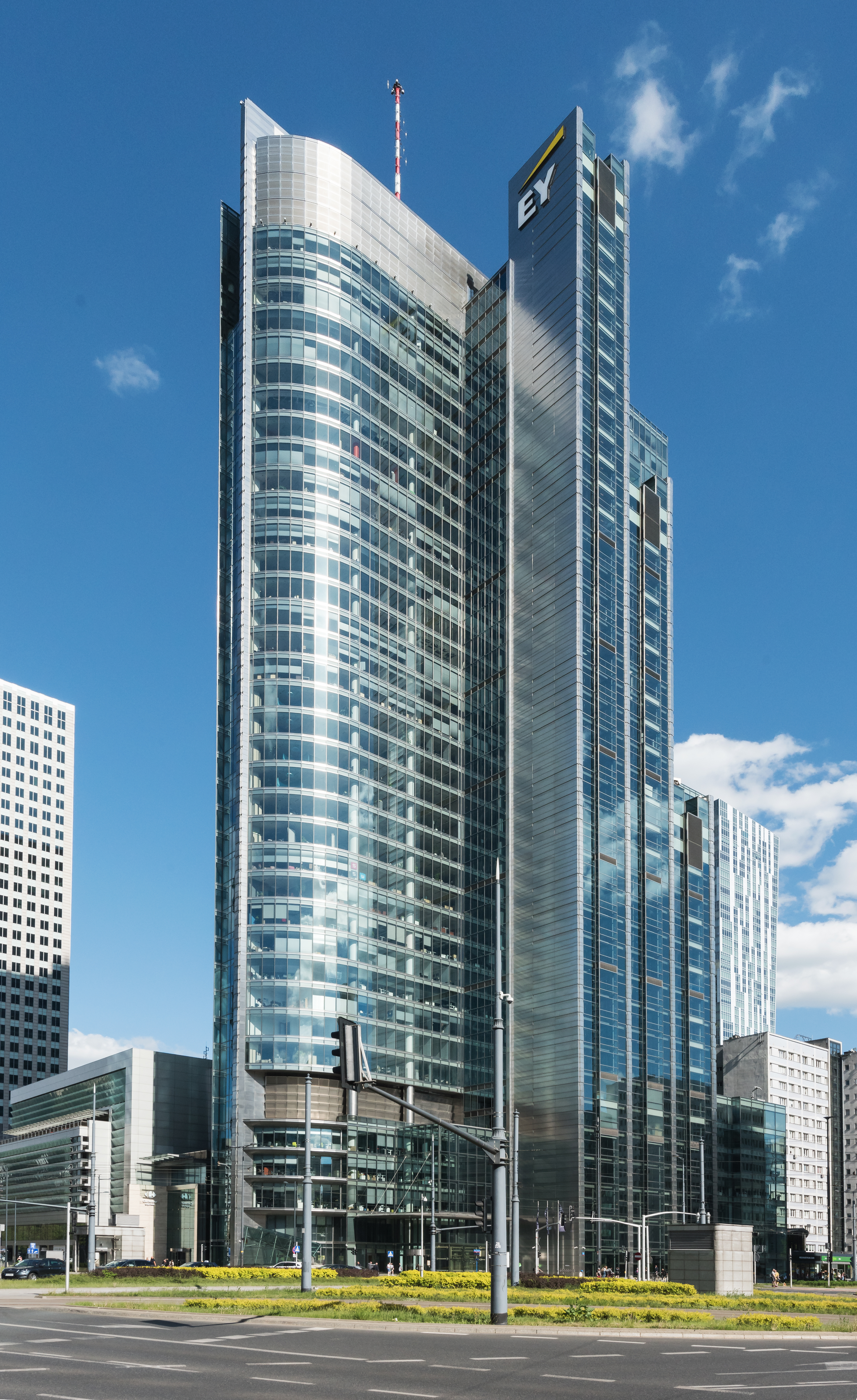
- Rondo ONZ Tower, Warsaw, Poland
- Interactive map of the Rondo 1 area

General information
- Status: Completed
- Type: Office Tower
- Location: Rondo ONZ 1, Warsaw, Poland
- Opened: February 2006

Height
- Roof: 159 m (522 ft)

Technical details
- Floor count: 40
- Floor area: 103,000 m^{2} (1,110,000 sq ft)

Design and construction
- Architect: Larry Oltmanns
- Architecture firm: Design Architect: Skidmore, Owings & Merrill; Executive Architect: Epstein Architecture

Website
- www.rondo1.pl

Rondo 1 is an office skyscraper with a total height of 192 m located in Warsaw, Poland at Rondo ONZ. The building was designed by Larry Oltmanns during his time as the Design Director for the London office of Skidmore, Owings & Merrill. Epstein Architecture acted as Executive Architects. The general contractor was HOCHTIEF Poland. Oltmanns stated that the design was informed by three aspirations: to create 'an idealised work environment adaptable to a wide range of ways of working; to contribute to a better plan for a liveable city; and to be a symbol of Warsaw's position in a global democratic world.'

Construction began in the spring of 2003; on 7 August 2004 the foundation stone was laid, and 7 March 2006 was the official opening of the building.

== See also ==
- List of tallest buildings in Poland
- List of tallest buildings in Warsaw
