= Jade Gatt =

Australian actor

- Born: Jade Gatt; 3 April 1978 (age 48); Sydney, New South Wales, Australia
- Occupations: Actor, presenter
- Years active: 1989–present
- Known for: Cheez TV; Ground Zero

Jade Gatt (born 3 April 1978) is an Australian actor who appeared in TV commercials, films and TV shows, and has hosted several Australian TV specials.

== Career ==
Gatt starred in the ABC's Swap Shop in 1990, and in 1994 was cast as Bradley in the pilot for The Bastards Next Door. Other roles in TV include parts in Heartbreak High and Home and Away.

In 1995 he began hosting the morning cartoon show Cheez TV for Network Ten, and in 1997 he appeared in the film Blackrock. Later that year he started hosting the late-night music program Ground Zero but was released from the show in July 1998. On 31 December 2004, Gatt and Ryan Lappin finished presenting the children's show Cheez TV, but still continued to air without presenters until 20 August 2005.

Gatt and his former Cheez TV co-host Lappin were special guests at AVCon in 2011, which ran from 22 to 24 July for that year. AVCon is an anime and video games convention that is held yearly in Adelaide, South Australia, during July.

On 14 February 2016, Gatt and his former Cheez TV co-host Ryan Lappin launched a podcast called The Jade & Ryan Show, which ended in 2017.

== Filmography ==
=== Film ===
Year	Title	Role	Notes
1989	The Punisher	Tommy (uncredited)	Feature film
1995	Billy's Holiday	Alex	Feature film
1997	Blackrock	Scottie	Feature film
2014	Convict	Tim	Feature film

=== Television ===
Year	Title	Role	Notes
1990	Swap Shop		
1994	The Bastards Next Door	Bradley	Pilot episode
1994	Home and Away	Marty	1 episode
1995	Pizza	Pizza Shack Clerk	1 episode
1995–2004	Cheez TV	Co-host	2545 episodes
1996–1998	Ground Zero	Host	
1997	Heartbreak High	Dino Camilla	1 episode
1999	Songs from Dawson's Creek	Host	TV special
2003	The Simpsons Extravaganza	Host	TV special

=== Podcasts ===
Year	Title	Role	Notes
2016–2017	The Jade & Ryan Show	Co-host	
