= National Bingo Night (Australian game show) =

- National Bingo Night Logo
- Genre: Game show
- Presented by: Tim Campbell
- Starring: Renee Bargh; Tanveer Ahmed
- Country of origin: Australia
- Original language: English
- No. of seasons: 1
- No. of episodes: 6

Production
- Running time: 60 minutes per episode (including commercials)

Original release
- Network: Seven Network
- Release: 21 October – 25 November 2007

National Bingo Night was an Australian game show, based on the American game show of the same name, which premiered on the Seven Network on 21 October 2007. The show was hosted by former Home and Away star Tim Campbell with former Girlband member Renee Bargh acting as the number caller. Tanveer Ahmed acted as the "commissioner", who refereed the playing studio audience. The show was axed after six weeks.

== Overview ==
National Bingo Night was marketed as an interactive experience for both the studio audience and viewers at home. Members of the studio audience attempted to win a game of bingo while competing against a solo studio contestant. Each episode consisted of three games represented by red, white and blue bingo cards.

Home viewers could collect pre-printed game cards from newspapers and the internet, and check the winning status of those cards by watching the program or checking the website after the show finished. Winning cards could be redeemed for a $100 cash prize and were also eligible to enter a weekly draw for $10,000.

The show was pre-recorded, and the winning numbers pre-determined by the producers. A small set of winning cards was put into circulation. As a result, the game was not a true game of bingo, but rather a lottery, as emphasised in the game's terms and conditions.

An end-of-season second chance draw had been planned for all home viewers, whether they won prizes or not, where they had the chance to win any unclaimed cash or prizes. Following the cancellation of the show, the second chance draw was cancelled as well.

== Games ==
In each game, the solo contestant competed in a minigame that also served to unveil the numbers being called for the game. The contestant then tried to complete the minigame and outlast the audience before they could declare bingo. If they were successful, they won the major prize; if an audience member beat them to it, they walked away with nothing.

The solo contestant played for a substantial major prize (such as a Jeep Grand Cherokee, a holiday package or $50,000 cash), while members of the studio audience competed for a lesser cash prize of $5,000. Three special prize balls also gave the contestant the chance to win up to an additional $10,000 if drawn.

Contestants could only use certain drawn balls to put towards their game, determined by correctly guessing whether the next number is either red or black, odd or even or higher or lower than the previously drawn number, depending on the game. Some of the games were easier to win than others. For example, Time Flies requires a total of 365 to complete as opposed to Bingo 500 requiring a total of 500, while Around the World could be potentially won in no more than 9 straight correct guesses (providing no audience member declares bingo).

=== Bingo 500 ===
This game involved contestants aiming to have all their bingo balls add up to 500. In this game, the contestant guessed whether the next ball is higher or lower than the last ball drawn out. The player's first guess was higher or lower than their age.

=== Showroom Challenge ===
This game involved contestants trying to have all the numbers on the bingo balls pulled out appear on the price of their new Jeep. This game has only been played once and was replaced by Win the VIN. The player had to guess whether the next ball is higher or lower than the last ball drawn out. The player's first guess is higher or lower than their age.

=== Bingo Gold Card ===
This game involves contestants trying to match the numbers that appear on a Bingo Gold Card.

=== Win the VIN ===
This game involved contestants trying to have all the numbers on the bingo balls pulled out appear on the VIN of their new Jeep.

=== Time Flies ===
This game involved players trying to make, like Bingo 500, all the numbers on the bingo balls pulled out add up to 365. In this game, the player guessed whether the next ball is black or red.

=== Around the World ===
This game involved the contestant trying to make 9 correct guesses to win $50,000 worth of travel.

=== Money Bags ===
This game involved the contestant trying to have all numbers on the bingo balls drawn to appear on the serial number of their hundred-dollar note.

== Controversy ==
National Bingo Night achieved a degree of controversy concerning how the game was played and the allegations that the network has not paid winnings claimed by home viewers and audience members.

On 13 November 2007, the Nine Network's A Current Affair said that the show was rigged and the numbers could be easily predicted. It was revealed that the show is actually pre-recorded, and that the play-at-home bingo cards are purposely generated such that most – if not all – players will have cards that are "one away" from a complete winning combination, thus giving players the hope of having the winning card for most of the televised event. This analysis was performed by examining a large number of bingo cards, and seeing that all games shared a common subset of numbers. Disclaimers on the bottom of the play-at-home cards specifically stated that they were not legally considered bingo cards, indicative that the numbers were constructed following the taping. A Current Affair also showed footage about how the ball that came down the tube was not the ball that got picked up by Renee.

Then, on the following day, 14 November 2007, A Current Affair aired an exposé on the show, where a woman claimed she won $100 through the home viewer competition. After completing the claim form on Channel 7's website, and a longer than expected delay receiving her prize, she contacted Channel 7 where they told her that she never registered to claim her prize.

The day after the final, Tanveer Ahmed appeared on Channel Seven's Today Tonight to defend the rigging claims. The story ended with Ahmed, in a reference to the show's catchphrase, saying:

"There is NO RIGGING on National Bingo Night"

On 18 March 2008, the hosts of Seven's Sunrise were ambushed by protesters chanting and carrying placards that claimed "Channel 7 doesn't pay", a reference to the non-payment of winnings to winning National Bingo Night audience members and home viewers, live on air. Host David Koch blamed the incident on A Current Affair, a theory that was lent credence when the same protesters appeared on that night's episode of the program. Both Koch and co-host Melissa Doyle have promised to look into the allegations, but later simply read a prepared statement from Seven Network Management.

There also was controversy in how players can be one away. In episode 4, red card, after the first four numbers were called containing 3 Os and a G, a studio audience player was one away. Another case was in episode 5, red card, after the first seven balls were called out containing 3 Bs, 2 Gs and 2 Os, two studio audience players were one away. (This is possible, as the middle "N" is a free space; BNGO is possible, with only the I-ball being needed.)

In episode 5, white card, one person was one away after six balls were called out (4 Is and 2 Gs, a plausible situation); the next ball called out was N41 – and another six audience members were one away. In these cases, there was no possible way of being one away from Bingo.

== Parodies ==
It was referenced several times on Season 2 of comedy show The Chaser's War on Everything.

== See also ==
- National Bingo Night (American game show), the American version
