= Electric (Girlband song) =

Single by Girlband
- B-side: "By Your Side"
- Released: 28 April 2007 (Australia)
- Recorded: 2007
- Genre: Pop; Rock
- Length: 3:32
- Label: Sony BMG
- Songwriter(s): Arnthor Birgisson; Ali Tennant
- Producer(s): Arnthor Birgisson

Girlband singles chronology
"Party Girl" (2006)	"Electric" (2007)

"Electric " is the second single released from the Australian pop group Girlband. It was released in 2007.

== Track listing ==
1. "Electric" (Radio Edit)
2. "Electric" (Kam Denny Club Mix)
3. "Electric" (Kam Denny Dub Mix)
4. "By Your Side"

== Charts ==
Chart (2007)	Peak position
Australian ARIA Singles Chart	73
