= Lopez Center =

General information
- Status: Stale Proposal
- Type: Mixed-use
- Location: Rockwell Center, Makati

Height
- Antenna spire: 320 m (1,050 ft)

Technical details
- Floor count: 52

Design and construction
- Architect: Skidmore, Owings & Merrill

The Lopez Center is a proposed building that will rise at a one-hectare area at JP Rizal, Rockwell Center, Makati, Philippines. It was launched in 2008 as a mixed-use building that has 50 floors. It would be the future headquarters of several companies owned by the Lopez family. The tower is named after Manolo Lopez, the owner and developer of the Rockwell Center. It is expected to be the tallest building in the Philippines once completed. It is designed after the new One World Trade Center in New York City. One of its earlier designs included a crown on top but it was later changed to a new and better design. It was supposed to begin construction in 2007 but was delayed. The office space is planned to be operational in 2011.

== See also ==
- List of tallest buildings in Metro Manila
