= Musical theatre dance =

Dance in musical theatre

Musical theatre dance is known for its dance styles used in it. It is a type of dancing that is popular in musical theatre. The dancers often are referred to as "triple threats" from their ability to sing, dance and act within a show.

There have been books written describing the musical theatre choreography from Oxford University Press, and Linda Sabo.

== History ==
=== Ancient Theatre ===
Musical theatre dance started with ancient Greek dramas that included dancing and singing as a part of their acts. The Romans evolved those dramas and grew the dance part of the dramas. They had pantomime dancers who used their bodies and words with music to put on elaborate performances.

=== Minstrelsy ===
During the colonial era in America, white men would paint their faces black and put on shows to mock African Americans and glorify slavery. These kinds of shows were called minstrel shows that were some of the earliest shows to combine singing and dancing to create a story. Many key dance components of musical theatre dance became popularized because of these shows, like the shuffle, buck and wing, the soft shoe and cakewalk.

=== The Black Crook ===
The Black Crook was an unexpected musical theatre performance that spawned from a ballet show and melodrama set to perform on the same day. The ballet show was supposed to have its show at the Academy of Music, but it burned down leaving them with nowhere to go. The manager of the drama Thomas Wheatley took them in and added them to the drama to create The Black Crook, a five hour musical theatre performance that became popular with audiences. This performance become known as the first musical, and was the beginning of musical theatre in the United States.

=== Vaudeville ===
Vaudeville was another form of performance that consisted of many different unrelated acts that consisted of song, dance, puppetry, illusion, acrobatics and other various performances. The dance element led to the popularity of tap, which was thanks to prominent vaudevillians such as Bill "Bojangles" Robinson using it in their shows.The dance form has heavy influences on musical theatre dance and has become a staple in the genre.

=== Ragtime and Ballroom ===
The combination of European and African music elements birthed the ragtime genre, defined by its syncopated rhythms. The African American dances such as the two-step and the cakewalk were primarily used with ragtime music, but new dances evolved such as the one step during this era.These ragtime dances were co-opted by Irene and Vernon Castle to create a new genre of dance called Ballroom dancing. Here they created what became known as the Castle Walk and popularized various dances such as the Grizzly Bear, Bunny Hug, Fox Trot, and the Maxixe.

== Dance Contributions ==
As musicals evolved since their first appearance in America as "The Black Crook", the dance aspect has become a defining factor. It went from being an afterthought to the element that guides the direction of a show. As director-choreographers took a more prominent part in the creation of a musical show, performances became more seamless and took on a more artistic style.
