= Swap Shop (Australian TV series) =

Australian children's television series

- Genre: Children's
- Written by: Ian Bone, Julia Kalytis
- Directed by: Ian Bone; Julia Kalytis
- Starring: Melissa Jaffer; Tim McKenzie
- Theme music composer: James Valentine / Roger Mason
- Country of origin: Australia
- Original language: English
- No. of seasons: 2
- No. of episodes: 56

Production
- Executive producer: Judith Simpson
- Producers: Ian Bone; Julia Kalytis
- Running time: 30 minutes

Original release
- Network: ABC
- Release: 20 June 1988 – 1990

Swap Shop is an Australian children's television series that screened on the ABC from 1988. The show features comedy, stories, animation and has musical guests performing original songs. It debuted on 20 June for an initial 12 episodes. A Christmas episode aired on 23 December and the second season began on 1 May 1988.

== Synopsis ==
Aunt Mimi and George run a shop where things are swapped instead of purchased.

== Cast ==
- Melissa Jaffer as Aunt Mimi
- Tim McKenzie as George
- Cecily Polson
- Ernie Dingo
- Jade Gatt
- John Ewart
- Kym Valentine
- Laura Vazquez
- Liddy Clark as Dot
- Paul Chubb
- Penny Cook
- Stephen Leeder as Mr Bradshaw
- Wendy Playfair

== Episodes ==
- Moo
- Shorts
- Snores
- Drips
- Chopsticks
- Aliens
- Birthday
- Thief
- Tea
- Woof
- Tutu
- Vote
- Mummy
- Christmas
- Star - part 1
- Star - part 2
- Video
- Hiccups
- Ole
- Fire
- Air
- Tents
- Shoes
- Hello
- Flyers
- Sing
- Gift
- Novel
- Break
- Renovation
- Tick Tock
- Yeah
- Flood
- Swim
- Hero
- Clubs
- Nightmare
- Cereal
- Treasure Hunt

== Reception ==
Sian Watkins of the Age said, "The Ideas behind Swap Shop are hardly innovative — Sesame Street has been doing similar things for years — but nevertheless it's light and fun a hint of something comic." Judith Whelan from the Sydney Morning Herald, commenting on tangents from the main story lines, wrote, "It is these extra bits that make the series work." Commenting on the first episode of the second season Jim Schembri of the Age notes, "Most of this episode is congenial but disposable and a bit too down beat."

== Soundtrack ==
An EP (1988) and a record (1989), both titled Swap Shop, were released featuring songs from the show.
