= Girlband (Australian band) =

Australian pop band

- Origin: Australia
- Genre: Pop
- Years active: 2006–2008
- Label: Sony BMG
- Members: Renee Armstrong; Renee Bargh; Jessica Smith; Patrice Tipoki

Girlband was an Australian pop band that was formed in 2006. It was put together by Sony BMG together with Peppermintblue Management and Mark Byrne from Rogue Traders. There were four members: Renee Armstrong, Renee Bargh, Jess Smith and Patrice Tipoki.

== Biography ==
The girls released their first single Party Girl in 2006. Their second single, Electric, was released in 2007.

In February 2007, the group traveled to Mumbai, India to film a promotional song for Sajid Nadiadwala's superhit Bollywood film 'Heyy Babyy' starring superstar Akshay Kumar.

Later that year, the group supported a national tour for The Rogue Traders before disbanding in April 2007.

== Members ==
=== Jess Smith ===
Graduated from Brent Street School of Performing Arts and has appeared in Blue Water High (2005), Home and Away (2008) and Reef Doctors (2013), as well as appearing in a range of stage productions that include Caroline O'Connor - All That Jazz.

=== Renee Bargh ===
Australian born in 1986. After attending High School in Mullumbimby moved to Sydney to attend the Brent Street School of Performing Arts. Prior to Girlband she had appeared in theatre productions including Hats Off 2005 and Wimbledon Charity Ball 2004. After Girlband disbanded she acted in National Bingo Night (2007) and Next Wave (2009) In 2010 she moved to Los Angeles to take on the continuing role of co-host and correspondent on Weekend Extra.

=== Renee Armstrong ===
Graduated from Australian College of Music and Brent Street School of Performing Arts and appeared in Bootmen (both film and stage productions), Home and Away and Always Greener. In 2011 she played Amber in the stage production of Hairspray in both Melbourne and Sydney. In 2014 she appeared in a short comedy film Clean and Jerk. She became a personal trainer. bikini coach, IFBB Competitor and in 2013 was NSW champion in IFBB Bikini open division.

=== Patrice Tipoki ===
Patrice Tipoki was born in New Zealand and grew up in Australia. She graduated from the Western Australian Academy of Performing Arts and has toured with a number of musical theatre productions, including We Will Rock You and Disney's The Lion King (as the lead character of Nala). She has also appeared in Anyone Can Whistle (Fay Apple), Songs for a New World, West Side Story (Maria) and Prodigal (Maddy). In 2010, she joined the cast of the Sydney production of Wicked, alternating the lead role of Elphaba with Jemma Rix. She had been the understudy for the role in Melbourne and had taken time out to have a baby. In 2014, she played the role of Fantine in the Australian production of Les Miserables. Patrice went on to Play the Role of Fantine on the West End in London. In 2015 she also released her first album, Patrice Tipoki - A Musical Heart. In 2018, she was featured in a broadcast performance of Music & the Spoken Word with The Tabernacle Choir at Temple Square.

== Discography ==
=== Singles ===
List of singles, with selected chart positions
Title	Year	Peak chart positions
Title	Year	AUS
"Party Girl"	2006	43
"Electric"	2007	73
