= Channel V Australia =

Australian subscription TV music channel

Channel [V] Australia
- Country: Australia
- Broadcast area: Australia

Programming
- Language: English
- Picture format: 576i (SDTV 16:9)

Ownership
- Owner: Foxtel Networks
- Sister channels: Country Music Channel; Max; V Hits

History
- Launched: 22 April 1995; 31 years ago
- Closed: 25 March 2016; 10 years ago (original)
- Replaced by: [V] Hits +2 (later [V])
- Former names: Red (prior to April 1997)

Links
- Website: www.vmusic.com.au

Channel [V] Australia was an Australian subscription television music channel that was available on Foxtel, Optus TV and Austar satellite and cable services. It was also previously available in New Zealand on TelstraSaturn's cable TV service in Wellington, Kapiti and Christchurch, until a channel shake-up occurred under new owners TelstraClear in 2002.

Channel [V] was targeted at the youth market, and played both mainstream and alternative music from local and international artists. Although it used the name Channel [V] in Australia, it had little association with the international affiliates and used the name under the license of News Corporation via STAR TV.

Previously called Red, Channel [V] commenced broadcasting in April 1995 on the now defunct Galaxy service. The name change to Channel [V] came about after owners XYZ Entertainment (now XYZnetworks) and Channel [V] International came to agreement over naming rights in March 1997. The first channel manager of Channel [V] was ex Network TEN Video Hits Producer Donna Andrews. After the successful launch, ex radio man Barry Chapman took over. In 2004, the launch of Foxtel Digital and other digital cable and satellite services saw a second [V] branded channel begin broadcasting called V Hits (formerly Club[V]), which is a 24-hour music channel that focuses more on music without TV shows.

Channel [V] closed on 25 March 2016, replaced with a two-hour timeshift channel of [V] Hits. Starting from 27 February 2016, [V] saw programming changes, which included the end of all programs which involved VJs and other personnel. This was followed by the relaunch of [V] Hits as the main music clip channel, featuring only music videos and countdowns. The closure came as viewers increasingly sought music videos from online sources rather than on television, which had resulted in a steady decline in [V]'s viewership. As a result of the closure, three staff members were made redundant, and Danny Clayton's contract with the network (which was set to expire midyear) was not renewed.

However, in 2017 Foxtel refocused [V] Hits to Foxtel [V] and [V] Hits +2 became [V] +2; a time-shift channel. On 1 July 2020, [V] was replaced by NickMusic, bringing the Channel [V] brand in Australia to an end after 25 years on television.

== [V]Js ==
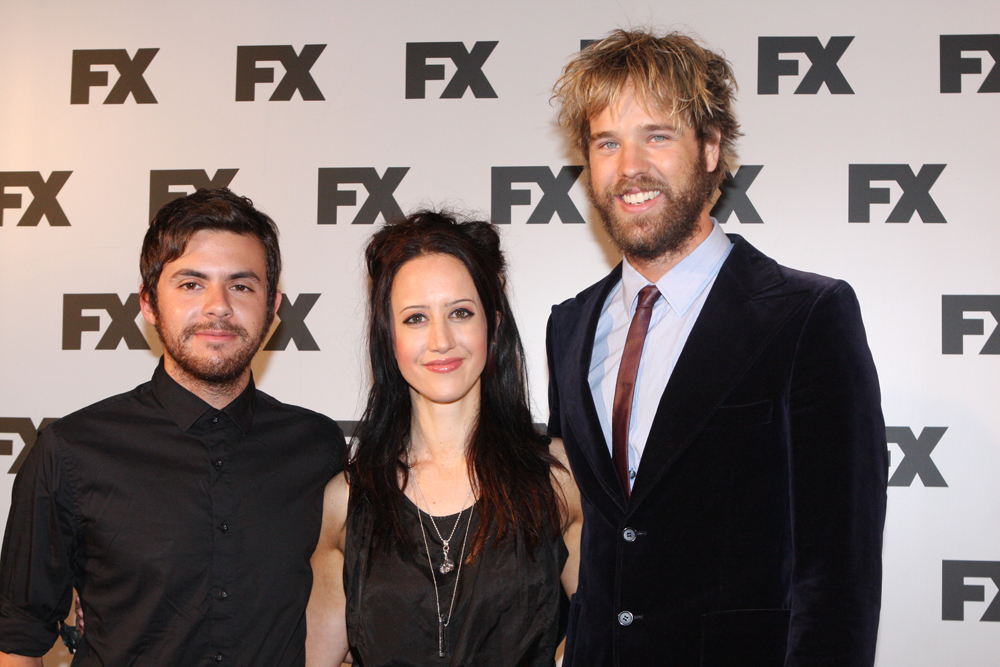
Billy Russell, Jane Gazzo and Danny Clayton in 2012

=== Final [V]Js ===
- Danny Clayton (2004 – March 2016)
- Carissa Walford (July 2011 – March 2016)
- Generik (April 2015 – March 2016)
- Bert McCracken (April 2015 – March 2016)
- Bambi Northwood-Blyth (April 2015 – January 2016)

=== Former [V]Js ===
- Marty Smiley (July 2012 – July 2015)
- Tasha Yulia (July 2012 – unknown)
- Megan Connolly
- Billy Russell (December 2009 – 2013)
- Jane Gazzo (May 2007 – June 2012)
- Kyle Linahan (July 2009 – June 2011)
- Renee Bargh (March 2008 – June 2010)
- Nick Bennett
- Kelly Burchill
- Stephen Bourke
- Alle Brunning
- Maynard
- Mary Datoc
- Andrew G
- Donna Gubbay
- Nathan Harvey
- Deni Hines
- Kyla Irlam
- Jabba
- Maya Jupiter
- James Kerley (2007 – December 2009)
- Mike Kerry
- Jake Grigg (Guest presenter)
- James Mathison
- Andrew Mercado (1999 – 2004)
- Paula McGrath
- Leah McLeod
- Molly Meldrum
- Chloe Maxwell
- Toni Pearen
- Leah Purcell
- Yumi Stynes

Dave Lawson is one of the hosts of The Dave and Kerley Show but is not considered a [V]J

=== Channel [V] Presenter Search 2012 ===
Over 6,000 people applied for a chance to become a Channel [V] presenter. These applicants were shortlisted to a top 20, with 4 finalists announced on Saturday 16 June 2012.

== Programming ==
- V Music Video Chart
- The Revolution with Bert McCracken
- V Indie
- V Popped
- The Connect
- The Big Mix featuring Messed Up with Generik
- iTunes Weekly Countdown
- V Ripe Clip of The Week
- V Vs
- V 10 Most Requested Video
- V Buzz Artist
- Guerrilla Gigs
- V Island Parties
- Oz Countdown: Top 40
- Festival of V
- V 10 Hottest Tracks Right Now
- V Late Night
- B430
- Cash Cab (2007–2014)
- The Dave & Kerley Show (2008)
- The Riff (2010–2015)
- V LOUD
- whatUwant - previously By Demand (2002–2008)
- The Informer (2000–2001)
- The Buzz (1998–1999)
- Freestyle (2006–2009) with Maja Jupiter

=== [V] Oz Artist of the Year ===
The Channel V Oz Artist of the Year was an annual award presented by Channel V Australia some times at the ARIA Music Awards.

== [V] Hits ==
On 12 January 2007, Club [V] was rebranded as Channel [V]^{2} and began showing a more varied range of video clips. Channel [V] remained as a more entertainment orientated channel and began broadcasting in widescreen on the same day. Channel [V] boasted programming including: The Dudesons, BDO & various music specials.

On 15 November 2009, Channel [V]^{2} was relaunched as [V] Hits.
