= AVCon =

Anime and gaming festival in Adelaide, Australia

AVCon Anime and Gaming Festival
- Status: Active
- Genre: Anime; Manga; Japanese pop culture; Video games; Tabletop games; Cosplay
- Frequency: Annual
- Venue: Adelaide Showground
- Locations: Adelaide, South Australia
- Country: Australia
- Inaugurated: July 20, 2002; 24 years ago
- Next event: July 3, 2027; 7 months' time
- Attendance: 20,600 (2026)
- Organiser: Team AVCon Incorporated
- Filing status: Not-for-profit
- Website: www.avcon.org.au

AVCon Anime and Gaming Festival is a pop culture festival centred on anime, video games, Tabletop games and other aspects of Japanese pop culture held annually in Adelaide, South Australia. It is the largest combined anime and gaming festival in the Southern Hemisphere and a major attraction for the state.

AVCon is organised by the volunteer-based not-for-profit Team AVCon Incorporated.

== Events and programming ==
The festival is divided into multiple sections focusing on individual industries or fandoms.

- Anime screening rooms
- Manga library
- Industry and community-based panels and workshops
- Video games free play
- The 'Indie Games Room' for local game development
- Retro game museum
- Esports and video game tournaments
- Art tutorials and creative competitions
- Tabletop area including role-playing games, trading card games, board games, and wargaming
- Cosplay
- Quiz night
- Kids learning and activity area
- Artist Alley and exhibitor halls
- Community areas and meetups
- Maid café

=== AVCon After Dark ===
AVCon After Dark is the 18+ event that is complementary to AVCon and hosts content such as artist alley, panels and workshops with a mature age ratings, alcohol consumption, a nerd themed burlesque show and mature cosplay competition.

=== Games 4 Kids ===
In December 2023, Team AVCon Inc. ran its inaugural 'Games 4 Kids' charity. The charity has since become an annual effort in the South Australian anime and gaming community, using donations as well as proceeds from Team AVCon's Christmas Artist Market to purchase consoles and games for donation to the Adelaide Women's and Children's Hospital.

== Festival history ==
=== Early years (2002–2008) ===
AVCon began in 2002 as a collaborative effort between volunteers from the University of South Australia's Adelaide Japanese Animation Society (AJAS) and the University of Adelaide Video Gamers Association (AUVGA). Originally named AVConnection (a reference to the AV cables that connect a game console or DVD player to a TV), the event was held at the University of Adelaide in the Union Building. The event featured anime screenings, video game free play, a vendor hall, quiz nights, and cosplay activities.

In 2004, the event officially rebranded as AVCon, continuing to grow and expand on the University of Adelaide campus.

By 2008, the event had outgrown its university club status. The organizing body, Team AVCon Incorporated, was formally established as an incorporated entity and registered as a not-for-profit organization.

=== Growth and expansion (2009–2019) ===
In 2009, AVCon had grown too large to remain at the University of Adelaide campus. Team AVCon Inc. made the decision to relocate the event to the Adelaide Convention Centre. This venue upgrade, along with the introduction of new attractions such as the Indie Game Room, the Ichigo Ke-Ki Maid Cafe, and the Adelaide qualifying leg for the Madman National Cosplay Championship, resulted in a significant increase in attendance, with numbers more than doubling compared to the university years.

In 2011, AVCon hosted its first guests, including local celebrities Jade Gatt and Ryan Lappin from Cheez TV, as well as Yu-Gi-Oh! The Abridged Series creator Bea "LittleKuriboh" Billany. This marked the beginning of AVCon's ongoing efforts to attract both local and international talent as guests for future events.

In 2013, AVCon expanded its offerings by introducing esports to its lineup, featuring community matches and professional competitions in games such as Dota 2 and StarCraft II.

2015 saw a dedicated tabletop gaming section added to the festival, complementing the existing video game offerings. This new addition included tabletop role-playing games, Japanese and Western trading card games, board games, and wargaming. 2015 also saw the debut of the AusSpeedruns speedrunning marathon, further diversifying the event's programming.

Over the years, AVCon secured key partnerships with major companies, including principal sponsorship from Australian internet service provider Internode (now part of TPG Telecom) and Nintendo Australia.

=== COVID-19 pandemic (2020–2023) ===
Due to the COVID-19 pandemic in Australia, the 2020 AVCon festival was cancelled. The 2021 AVCon festival was initially scheduled to be held at a reduced capacity at the Morphettville Racecourse from 9–11 July; however, it was also cancelled due to ongoing pandemic-related restrictions. On 16 March 2022, Team AVCon released an official statement via social media and their website, announcing that the 2022 event would not take place due to the continued uncertainty surrounding COVID-19 complications.

Instead of the main festival, Team AVCon organized two smaller events in 2022. As part of the Adelaide Fringe, they held an Artist Market modeled after their traditional Artist Alley. In July, an AVCon After Dark event was also held, featuring DJs, local artists, and vendors.

After a three-year hiatus and with COVID-19 restrictions lifted in South Australia, AVCon 2023 was held as a large-scale event at the Adelaide Convention Centre from 21 to 23 July. The 2023 festival featured reduced space and a selection of virtual panels, marking the return of the event following the pandemic.

=== New era (2024–present) ===
In 2024, Team AVCon Inc. relocated the event to the Adelaide Showground, with a renewed focus on creative and community-oriented aspects. These included fun themes, commissioned artwork, mini-events, community outreach, a maid cafe, panels, art classes, arcades, and special guests. The event reached capacity on Saturday, marking the first time Team AVCon Inc. had to publicly announce that tickets for Saturday had sold out.

Additionally, 2024 saw the debut of AVCon's new After Dark format, which featured R18+ art and games, drawing workshops, alcohol service, and a burlesque show.

For the 2025 event, AVCon ran at the Adelaide Showground with expanded space utilising both the Wayville and Jubilee Pavilions. It also included a new kids area and a Magic the Gathering Commander Festival event known as 'Elder Dragon Summit.'

The 2026 event was hosted across the Jubilee Pavilion, Duncan Gallery, and Goyder Pavilions, the largest single indoor event space in all of South Australia, making it the biggest AVCon that had ever run. To match tickets for the Weekend, Saturday, Sunday, and After Dark sold out beforehand and the venue reached capacity. This made AVCon 2026 the first time attendees were turned away from all parts of the event unless they had pre bought a ticket.

=== Previous festivals ===
Dates	Location	Theme	Guests	Convenor/President
July 20–21, 2002	University of Adelaide	None	None	Neil Phillips
July 19–20, 2003	University of Adelaide	None	None	Neil Phillips
July 17–18, 2004	University of Adelaide	Wacky Japan	None	Connell Wood
July 16–17, 2005	University of Adelaide	RPG	None	Connell Wood
July 14–16, 2006	University of Adelaide	Pirates vs Ninjas	None	Mitchell Chapman
July 20–22, 2007	University of Adelaide	Rock Show	None	Mitchell Chapman
July 26–27, 2008	University of Adelaide	Space Opera	None	Mark Stoffels
July 24–26, 2009	Adelaide Convention Centre	Heroes and Villains	None	Mel Dyer
July 23–25, 2010	Adelaide Convention Centre	Into the Woods	None	Thomas Baker
July 22–24, 2011	Adelaide Convention Centre	Retro	Little Kuriboh, Ryan Lappin, Jade Gatt	Thomas Baker
July 27–29, 2012	Adelaide Convention Centre	Neon Future	Cassandra Lee Morris, Crispin Freeman	Tom Birdseye
July 12–14, 2013	Adelaide Convention Centre	School Days	Jessica Nigri, Chris Cason, Spike Spencer	Tom Birdseye
July 18–20, 2014	Adelaide Convention Centre	Fantasy RPG	Jon St. John, Cherami Leigh, Chris Avellone	William Brennan
July 17–19, 2015	Adelaide Convention Centre	Detective Agency	Jennifer Hale, Yaya Han, Eve Beauregard	William Brennan
July 15–17, 2016	Adelaide Convention Centre	Magica vs Mecha	Caitlin Glass, Good Game cast Steven "Bajo" O'Donnell, Stephanie "Hex" Bendixsen, Gus "Goose" Ronald, Nich "NichBoy" Richardson and Michael "Hingers" Hing	Kira Austin
July 21–23, 2017	Adelaide Convention Centre	Winter Festival	Quinton Flynn, Jen Taylor, Chris Pope, Steve Downes	Kira Austin
July 20–22, 2018	Adelaide Convention Centre	Evolution	Spike Spencer, Neil Kaplan, Major Sam Cosplay, Beke Cosplay, Vera Chimera, Knitemaya	Anthony Kearney
July 5–7, 2019	Adelaide Convention Centre	Join the Party	Paul St. Peter, D.C. Douglas	Ethan Levy
~~July 3–5, 2020~~	Cancelled	N/A	N/A	Emily Franzon
~~July 9–11, 2021~~	Morphettville Racecourse	Ultimate Fighter	JoshDub, Mully, SmashingVR, Michael Cusack, Henchwench, Scrap Shop Props	Emily Franzon
No Dates, 2022	No Event Run	N/A	N/A	Thao Vuong
July 21–23, 2023	Adelaide Convention Centre	21st Birthday	Lisle Wilkerson, Hiroshi Nagahama, Toshio Furukawa (Virtual), Shogo Sakata (Virtual)	Thao Vuong
June 28–30, 2024	Adelaide Showground (Jubilee Pavilion)	Sports Festival	Bryce Papenbrook (American Voice Actor), Ladybeard (as frontman of Babybeard), Dokibird (VTuber), Whereisdanielledebs (cosplayer), Zaphy (cosplayer), Shadinski (cosplayer), GrizzlyGhoul (cosplayer), Rowenberry (cosplayer), Galaxy Girl PAiDA (American JPop Idol)	Matthew "Mowen" Owen
July 5–6, 2025	Adelaide Showground (Jubilee and Wayville Pavilions)	AVCon Rangers (based on Power Rangers/Super Sentai)	Henry Thurlow (Animator), Deerstalker Pictures (Elliot Owen Charles and Goldie Soetianto), the cast of YouTube series '1 For All' (Eva Devore, Fall, SoylentCosplay, Pat Mandziy, ZacSpeaksGiant), SlightlyVillainous (cosplayer), Henchwench (cosplayer), Scrap Shop Props (cosplayer), Andy Trieu (Australian Media Personality)	Matthew "Mowen" Owen
July 4–5, 2026	Adelaide Showground (Jubilee Pavilion, Duncan Gallery, and Goyder Pavilion)	Rhythm☆Revolution	SungWon Cho (American YouTuber and Voice Actor), Allegra Clark (American Voice Actress), Snuffy (VTuber)	Matthew "Mowen" Owen
July 3–4, 2027	Adelaide Showground (Jubilee Pavilion, Duncan Gallery, and Goyder Pavilion)	Silver Anniversary (25 years)		Vicki Apostolidis

== Mascots ==
AVCon's original mascots were Ayvee, a green-haired, anime-inspired humanoid female with angel wings, and Sprite, her koala companion. In 2004, a male counterpart to Ayvee, named Switch, was introduced. Switch is a grey-haired, anime-inspired humanoid. Following his introduction, Sprite gradually became a background character and eventually disappeared from the mascot lineup. Ayvee and Switch have appeared in art and promotional materials every year since their creation, with designs contributed by various artists. The characters of Ayvee, Switch, and Sprite were created by two of AVCon's original organizers, Connell Wood and Melissa Waterman.

In 2021, a new mascot, Juliette, was introduced to represent the AVCon 'Ichigo Ke-Ki' Maid Cafe. Juliette is a petite, pink-haired humanoid female, and over time, she was refocused as a general AVCon mascot. Juliette was created by artist Rae Harris.

For the 2024 event, a new character was brought on because of the need for four team captains for that year's Sports Festival theme. A yellow-haired humanoid male with spiral glasses, a "nerd" aesthetic and robotic appendages. He was created by 2024 convenor Matthew "Mowen" Owen. This character was christened Wayville and his robot friend Ridley to honour the event's move to the Adelaide Showground.

In November 2024, during the theme reveal for the AVCon 2025 event, it was announced that Sprite would rejoin the mascot lineup for the upcoming event year with a focus of being appealing to children.

In March 2025, to avoid having mature association with the event's existing family friendly mascots, a specific AVCon After Dark mascot was created. A buxom humanoid female with long purple hair, glasses and a Succubus motif named Amethyst. Amethyst was created by Adelaide artist Tamago Nashi.

== Organisational structure ==
Team AVCon Incorporated, the parent organisation which produce AVCon, is a registered not-for-profit.

The operation of Team AVCon is organized into several distinct groups: the Elect, the committee, the Membership, Staff, and on-the-day Volunteers (referred to as "Invaders").

Membership consists of active and former members of Team AVCon, who are responsible for voting in the Elect each event year.

The Elect comprises four key positions: President, Vice President, Secretary, and Treasurer. The Elect is responsible for assembling the committee, which is made up of individuals overseeing the various departments necessary to run AVCon.

The Committee manages Staff, who are assigned to specific departments based on the event's needs. Staff are brought in as needed throughout the year to support the organization's operations.

The Elect, Committee, and Staff are responsible for overseeing AVCon's year-round activities. All members of these groups contribute on a voluntary basis and are not compensated for their time
