= Danny Clayton =

Australian television presenter

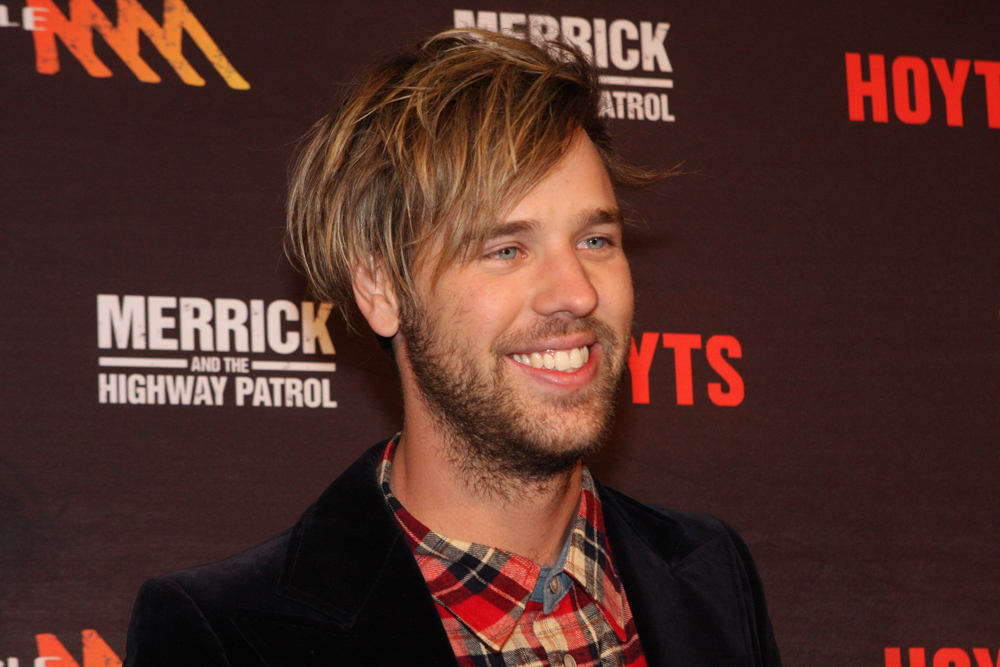
- Clayton in 2012
- Born: April 29, 1986 (age 40)
- Occupation: TV Presenter

Danny J. Clayton is an Australian television and radio presenter, host and DJ with four ASTRA Award nominations.

== Biography ==
Growing up on Sydney's Northern Beaches, Clayton attended St Aloysius' College.

Whilst he was still at school Clayton entered Channel [V] Australia 'Snapper' competition, aged 16 years, which he won, giving him the opportunity to work as a photographer with one of Australia's biggest music television channels, shooting music festivals and gigs all around Australia.

After storming the stage during filming of an episode of Australian Idol, Channel [V] management decided to trial him as a TV host for the channel. He has since filmed thousands of hours of live shows and television and has interviewed people such as Lady Gaga, Foo Fighters, Will Ferrell, Coldplay and Kristen Stewart.

As part of Channel [V]'s travel show in 2009, B430, Clayton travelled around the world as his antics were filmed.

Clayton is the host of the podcast, Music Saved Me, which is an initiative through charity Musicians Making A Difference. The podcast discusses music and mental health In 2020, Clayton joined Yahoo entertainment web series 'Build Sydney'.

In 2021, Clayton joined Red Bull e-sport series, 'The Wrap Up' as a host.

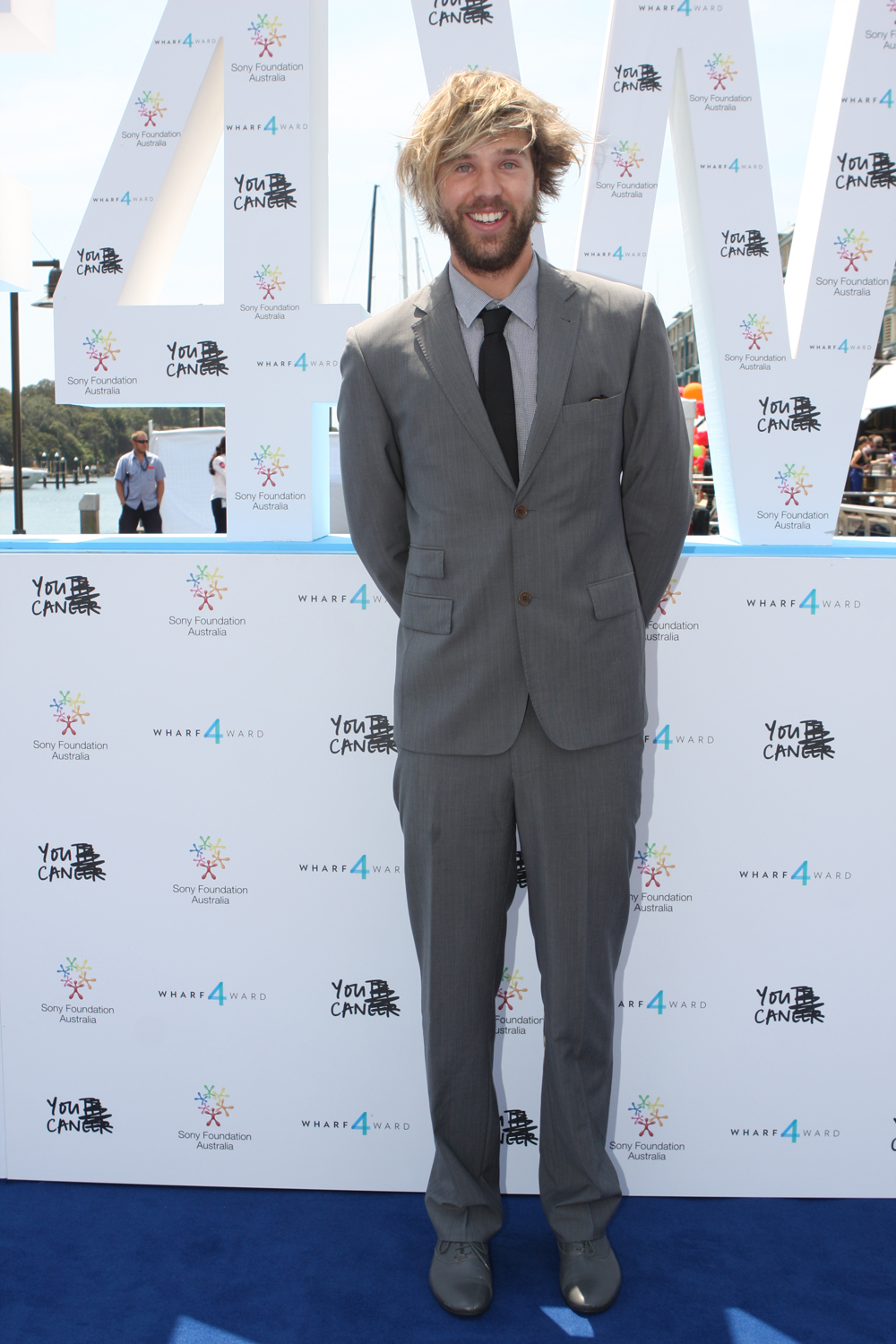

Clayton is known to host, DJ and MC events such as Wine Machine and Unite For The Night.

== Personal life ==
In 2009, Clayton was runner up in the Cleo Bachelor of the Year Awards.

In 2014, Clayton was involved in an accident at a trampoline park that left him in hospital with spinal injuries and took over a year to fully recover from. Clayton dated model Zoe Cross for a number of years and credited her for helping him recover from his accident. Famously, Clayton told American surfer, Kolohe Andindo, to stay away from Cross live on television after the surfer had been found to have sent her text messages.

In 2020, it was confirmed that Clayton was dating Abbie Chatfield from The Bachelor.
