= List of Home and Away characters introduced in 2006 =

Home and Away is an Australian soap opera. It was first broadcast on the Seven Network on 17 January 1988. The following is a list of characters that first appeared in 2006, by order of first appearance. They were all introduced by the show's series producer Julie McGuaran. The 19th season of Home and Away began airing on the Seven Network on 16 January 2006 and concluded on 1 December 2006. The first introduction of year was Amy Mathews as Rachel Armstrong in the year's premiere. Jessica Tovey joined the cast as Belle Taylor in February. Sam North began portraying Dom Moran in April. Rodger Corser and Trent Baines also joined the cast as Doctor Hugh Sullivan and Macca MacKenzie respectively. In July, Bobby Morley arrived as Drew Curtis and Chris Sadrinna was cast as Rachel's brother Brad Armstrong. October marked the introductions of Jessica Chapnik as Sam Tolhurst, her son Rory Tolhurst and the Cooper brothers Rocco and Johnny played by Ian Meadows and Callan Mulvey.

== Rachel Armstrong ==
Rachel Armstrong, played by Amy Mathews, debuted on-screen during the episode airing on 16 January 2006. In 2010, Mathews quit the soap to pursue other projects and Rachel's husband Tony Holden (Jon Sivewright) was also written out. The serial's official website describe Rachel stating: "She has great instincts for people and has a sharp mind; she’s fiercely independent and has great strength of character." Of Rachel's persona, Mathews states: "Rachel is outgoing and fun with a sharp mind and good instincts for people. She has incredible strength and is fiercely independent. She has strong values and definite ideas about right and wrong but she is also a romantic at heart." In 2007, Mathews received the Logie for "New Female Talent" for her portrayal of Rachel. Mathews was nominated for "Best Actress" and "Best Couple" for her relationship with Kim at the 2007 Inside Soap Awards. Soap opera reporting website Holy Soap describe Rachel's most memorable moment as: "Being taken hostage by the Believers cult, who tried to force her to deliver Tasha's baby."

== Belle Taylor ==
Susan "Belle" Taylor, played by Jessica Tovey, made her first on-screen appearance on 3 February 2006. Belle's storylines included finding her birth mother, a drug addiction, her relationship with Aden Jefferies and being diagnosed with cancer. In 2009, it was announced that Tovey had quit the show and the writers took the decision to kill off the character. Belle made her last appearance on 11 August 2009. Tovey joined Home and Away in 2006 when she was 18. The character of Belle was her first television role. In April 2009, Tovey announced that she had quit Home and Away. RTÉ's website describes Belle as being a "cheeky, extroverted young girl". She was full of insecurity from her "disciplined and controlling" upbringing. She craved love and attention from her parents, which they never gave to her. Belle's parents were shocked to discover their daughter was rejecting their conservative lifestyle and hanging out with the wrong crowd. Tovey earned various award nominations for her role as Belle. In 2007, Tovey earned a nomination for "Most Popular New Female Talent" at the Logie Awards. In 2010, she was nominated for "Most Popular Actress". At the 2007 Inside Soap Awards, Tovey was nominated for "Sexiest Female". In 2009, she received a nomination for "Best Actress" and "Best Storyline" for the drug addiction plot. 2010 saw Belle and Aden's wedding nominated in the Bride and Doom category at the 2010 All About Soap magazine awards. Belle's funeral episode was nominated for an Australian Writer's Guild Award in 2010. Virgin Media named Belle and Aden as one of "Soaps' sexiest couples", while viewers voted them "Home and Away's Hottest Couple" in a poll run by Holy Soap.

== Dom Moran ==
Dom Moran
- Home and Away character
- Portrayed by: Sam North
- Duration: 2006–08
- First appearance: 20 April 2006
- Last appearance: 14 February 2008
In-universe information
- Occupation: Mechanic
- Uncles: Ray Moran

Dominic "Dom" Moran, played by Sam North, first appeared on 20 April 2006 and departed on 14 February 2008.

Dom works for his uncle Ray (Damien Garvey) at his garage, Moran Motors. He begins playing many dangerous pranks on Ric Dalby (Mark Furze) and often gets him into trouble. Two of these incidents injure Ric, the first; Dom burns Ric with battery acid and in the second, he nearly kills him when he gives Ric a faulty jack which gives way and crushes him. He also begins harassing Ric's girlfriend Belle Taylor (Jessica Tovey) but is kneed in the groin by her and later punched by Ric. Ray then realises that Dom is too dangerous to work with and fires him.

The following year, Dom returns and begins supplying Drew Curtis (Bobby Morley) with illegal parts for his car, dubbed "The Beast" and is involved in the drag-racing scene with local thug, Denni Maitland (Joshua Helman). Denni is involved in a drag race against Drew and Lucas Holden (Rhys Wakefield), which results in Lucas' ex, Lisa Duffy (Jessica McNamee) being killed in a car crash. Dom steals Drew's car and torches it in order to prevent himself from being arrested for theft of the parts. He agrees to help exonerate Drew, now a suspect, if Belle gives him a kiss. Belle reluctantly complies and Dom confesses and is jailed for theft car parts.

Following his release, Dom kidnaps Belle. Drew, acting on a tip from Ray tracks them down and rescues Belle, they flee and hit Dom in the process. However, when they return to the site, Dom has disappeared. He resurfaces several days later in Belle's room and leaves a ring he gave her but leaves. A couple of weeks later, Dom turns up at the diner and collapses. Belle rushes Dom to hospital and Drew turns up and warns him off. A confrontation results in Dom needing emergency surgery and Belle tells him she loves him but admits to Drew she only did that to get Dom through the surgery. He recovers and begins rehab with the aid of Sam Holden (Jessica Chapnik), his physiotherapist who unwittingly convinces him to continue to pursue Belle. Dom takes a job at the diner and mocks Drew for having to repeat Year 12 when he serves him. Irene Roberts (Lynne McGranger) and Roman Harris (Conrad Coleby) engineer a plan to get Dom away from Belle by arranging for him to have an interview with Irene's daughter, Finlay (Tina Thomsen), who owns a restaurant in the city. However, Dom ruins his chances intentionally and exposed to Belle. He leaves for the city, saying he will return for Belle.

Clayton Smales of The Townsville Bulletin was critical of North's acting. He described North's stint as a "woeful turn" and labelled the character a "flannel-shirted, sparsely bearded Lothario".

== Hugh Sullivan ==
Hugh Sullivan
- Home and Away character
- Portrayed by: Rodger Corser
- Duration: 2006–2007
- First appearance: 5 April 2006
- Last appearance: 12 June 2007
- Introduced by: Julie McGuaran
In-universe information
- Occupation: Doctor
- Brothers: Brenton Sullivan
- Sisters: Collette Sullivan

Hugh Sullivan, played by Rodger Corser, made his first appearance on 5 April 2006 and made his last on 12 June 2007. In October 2020, Corser was pictured with Home and Away actors James Stewart and Ditch Davey in Coogee prompting speculation that he was rejoining the show. TV Week's Beth Brennan observed that his character was not killed off, so "the door is still open" for Corser to reprise his role.

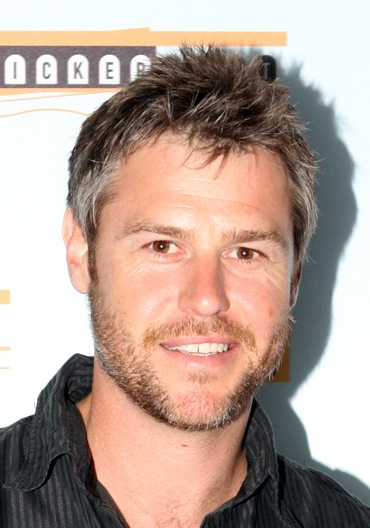
Rodger Corser joined the cast as Hugh in April.

Hugh arrives in Summer Bay as a friend and former lover of Rachel Armstrong (Amy Mathews). Rachel invites him to join her and Leah Patterson-Baker (Ada Nicodemou) for lunch at Leah's place. Hugh learns Leah is the midst of a separation from her husband Dan (Tim Campbell) and asks her on a date. Leah is reluctant at first and declines but she agrees later agrees and they share a kiss, which is witnessed by Dan. Hugh leaves after Leah rejects him, admitting that she did not feel that anything was there.

Hugh returns several months later and falls for Rachel, who is now married to Kim Hyde (Chris Hemsworth). He becomes a confidant to Rachel when she and Kim goes through a rough patch in their marriage and even organizes a picnic with him. Rachel sees Hugh flirting with Nurse Julie Cooper (Lisa Hayson-Phillips) and sets them up on a dinner date which proves very uncomfortable for them both. Julie asks Hugh if he still has feelings for Rachel, which he lies and says he does not. Rachel later invites Hugh to stay with her and Kim. When they attend a medical conference together a drunken Rachel tells Hugh she thinks she is more suited to her than Kim is. Hugh, uncomfortable moves out and begins sharing the diner flat with Martha MacKenzie (Jodi Gordon).

On a night out with Kim, Tony Holden (Jon Sivewright) and Ric Dalby (Mark Furze), Hugh meets Ingrid Lynch (Leigh Shorten) and spends the night with her. Rachel is jealous when she finds out but Hugh admits to Ingrid that he is emotionally unavailable. Rachel confronts Hugh about his awkwardness around her and he admits his feelings. She is shocked and was quick to tells him that he is just feeling that way because they used to live together and are still having to work together. Several days later, Hugh invites Rachel to join him for dinner which she accepts but leaves halfway through. She returns after a falling out with Kim and High agrees to let her stay. Hugh and Rachel then share a kiss after he comforts her.

Hugh receives a posting in Johannesburg and tries to keep it a secret, but Julie tells Rachel. He then gives Rachel an ultimatum; he will only stay if they can be together. Hugh gives Rachel some time to think, but leaves for South Africa following her indecisiveness. Several months later, Hugh emails Rachel, who is now engaged to Tony and asks to meet up with her, however, she turns down his offer.

Inside Soap ran a poll asking their readers to decide who Rachel should be with out of Hugh and Kim. The results indicated that they wanted Rachel to be with Hugh – who received fifty-seven percent of the vote.

== Macca MacKenzie ==
Macca MacKenzie
- Home and Away character
- Portrayed by: Trent Baines
- Duration: 2006–2007
- First appearance: 7 April 2006
- Last appearance: 23 February 2007
- Introduced by: Julie McGauran
In-universe information
- Occupation: Courier
- Mother: Pauline MacKenzie
- Brothers: Greg MacKenzie
- Sisters: Martha MacKenzie (adoptive)

Michael "Macca" MacKenzie, played by Trent Baines, made his first appearance on 7 April 2006. Macca is introduced as Martha MacKenzie's (Jodi Gordon)'s brother and a love interest for Cassie Turner (Sharni Vinson). He comes to Summer Bay to help Martha celebrate her birthday. Gordon commented "He surprises her when he turns up. No one else has met him yet. But Martha's ecstatic to see him again. She's just over the moon." Baines described his character as "a bit of a bogan" and "a bit of a country boy", adding that he likes beer, parties and riding quad bikes. Macca soon wins Martha's friends over with his "charm and quick wit".

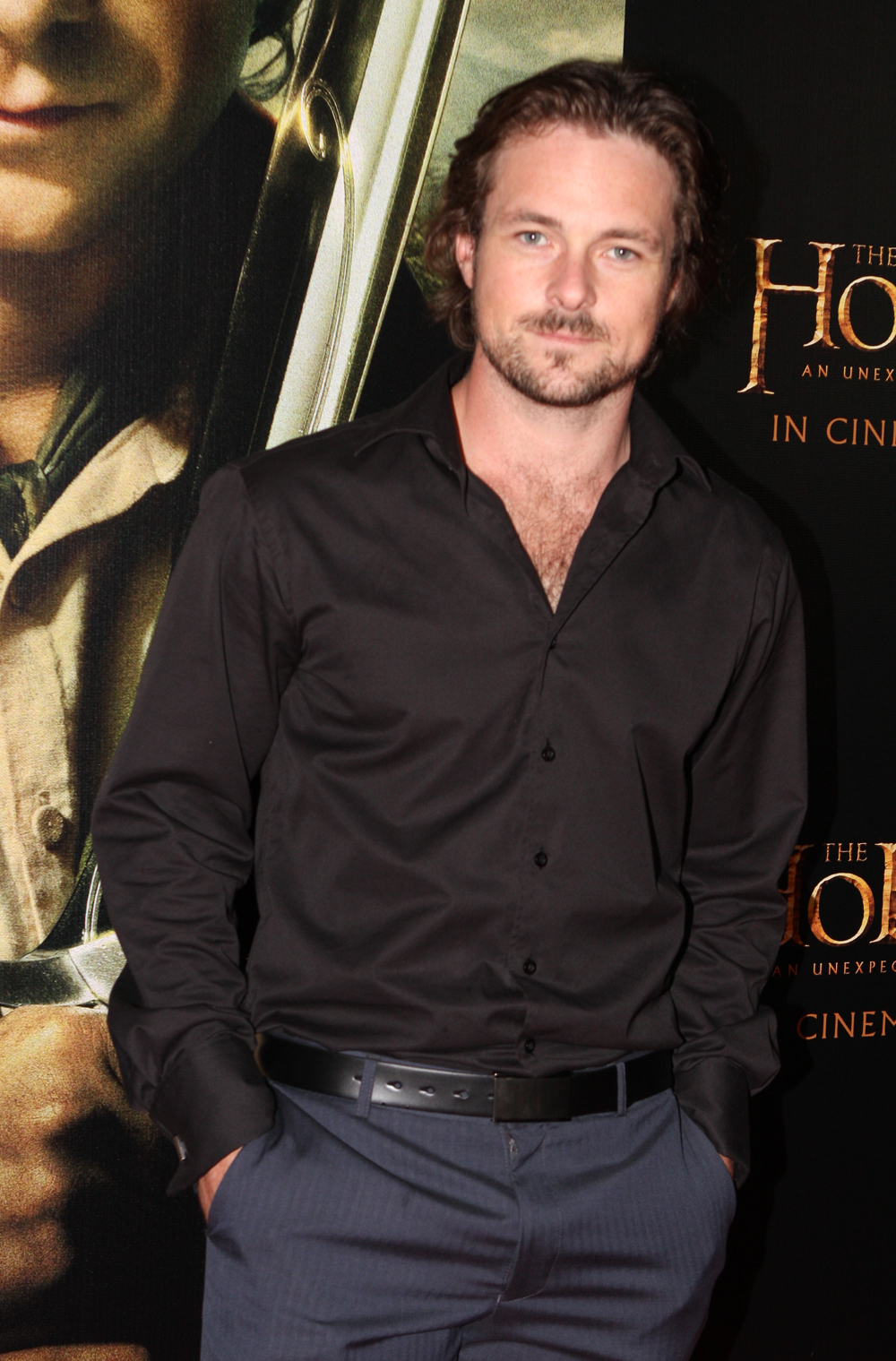
Trent Baines played Macca MacKenzie

Macca's main storyline focuses on his relationship with Cassie and repeated domestic abuse of her. Baines spoke about the story on the serial's official website: "It’s something that happens in society and it’s a shame and any of the girls who are out there I think they need to talk to somebody even if it’s not a friend or a family – possibly counselling or something like that – because I think that they might get stuck into the little world that gets created in a violent relationship." He added "I’ve learnt since playing the role of Macca that it’s a strange way of thinking, I can understand to an extent how it happens, but I certainly think that people in that situation have got some issues and I’ve got no cure for it. I wish I could say that all they need to do is 'this' and that will fix it, but I don't know."

Macca arrives in Summer Bay and almost collides with Belle Taylor (Jessica Tovey), who has taken Kim Hyde's (Chris Hemsworth) car. Martha MacKenzie (Jodi Gordon), Ric Dalby (Mark Furze) and Barry Hyde (Ivar Kants) go to investigate and Martha introduces Macca as her brother. Macca attends Martha's birthday party and soon makes friends with Cassie and begins helping her with boxing training. Martha has reservations about Macca dating Cassie as he had a tendency in the past to reject girls phone calls after getting bored with them. He receives an offer for a courier's job and plans to tell Cassie he is leaving but is afraid to tell her after she confesses her love for him. Macca then leaves and makes a promise to make their long-distance relationship work. He returns several weeks earlier and begins renting the flat above the Beachside diner. The hours his job demands take their toll on him and he turns to drugs. Ric discovers Macca's drug use and confronts him about it. He explains that a lot of other people at work do it and to prove a point, he flushes the drugs but calls for replacements several hours later. Cassie also discovers Macca's habit and confronts him and is hit as a result. He apologises to Cassie but continues hitting her and eventually injures her when he becomes jealous of her closeness with Ric.

The abuse escalates and Cassie tries to leave Macca. After Sally Fletcher (Kate Ritchie) confronts him and orders him to stay away from Cassie, He hands himself in to the police and gets help. Martha bans him from her wedding to Jack but he turns up outside the venue. When an explosion occurs, Macca races into help Martha and Tony get an injured Jack to safety but is crushed by a falling beam. Cassie stands by his side until he is taken to hospital. He discharges himself when Martha and several others are missing when their helicopter crashes and joins the search. Macca saves Ric from a fall, and despite being injured pulls him to safety. He leaves after the group are found.

Macca returns several months later and tells Cassie he has finished his counselling. Cassie and Macca are drawn back together, despite Cassie having reconciled with Ric several months earlier and begin an affair. Ric discovers the affair and attacks Macca. Sally and Alf Stewart (Ray Meagher) quickly break up the fight. Macca is then evicted from the caravan park. He begins staying with Amanda Vale (Holly Brisley) who kisses him but he rejects her. Macca's company offer him a desk job in the city and Cassie agrees to join him despite Sally's protest. The move does not last as Cassie is drawn back to the bay due to Sally being stabbed and Ric being arrested for the murder of Rocco Cooper (Ian Meadows). Macca tries to get Cassie to return with him but she will not and he hits her again. He is disgusted with himself and hands himself in to the police once more.

== Drew Curtis ==
Drew Curtis was played by Bobby Morley. He made his first on-screen appearance on 7 July 2006 and departed on 21 March 2008. Prior to joining the serial, Morley appeared in a production Angels with Dirty Faces, and was spotted by the Home and Away casting agents who asked him to come in and have a chat. The chance to audition for Drew came up and Morley was cast in the role, despite being older than the character. Morley relocated from Melbourne to Sydney for the show and he admitted that he was quite nervous during his first six weeks on set and that he had to get used to the fast speed at which they shoot scenes. Morley quit Home and Away at the end of 2007. Morley told The Daily Telegraph that he often had to take his shirt off for scenes and that he was treated like a "meat puppet" on the show. The official Home and Away website described Drew as "brooding" and having a "chip on his shoulder the size of Queensland." For his portrayal of Drew, Morley was nominated for the "Most Popular New Male Talent" Logie Award in 2007. Scott Ellis of The Sun-Herald branded Drew a "teenage tearaway." While Paul Kalina of The Age called him a "bad-boy heart-throb."

== Brad Armstrong ==
Brad Armstrong
- Home and Away character
- Portrayed by: Chris Sadrinna
- Duration: 2006–2007
- First appearance: 11 July 2006
- Last appearance: 13 November 2007
- Introduced by: Julie McGuaran
In-universe information
- Occupation: Principal of Summer Bay High (2006–07)
- Father: Robert Armstrong
- Mother: Elaine Armstrong
- Sisters: Rachel Armstrong
- Half-sisters: Tamsyn Armstrong
- Wife: Emily Vincent (2006)
- Nephews: Harry Holden

Bradley "Brad" Armstrong, played by Chris Sadrinna, made his first appearance on 11 July 2006 and departed on 13 November 2007. Shortly before he arrived, an Inside Soap reporter stated that Brad would help ease Sally Fletcher's (Kate Ritchie) pain over the death of her husband, Flynn Saunders (Joel McIlroy). A spokesperson from the show revealed "Sally's due a bit of good luck. Brad's a nice guy, but he has his fair share of problems – which develop when his mother is killed in tragic circumstances. But he and Sally will draw strength from each other."

Brad arrives in Summer Bay following the death of his mother Elaine (Julie Hudspeth). Sally Fletcher arrives to find Brad in Leah Patterson-Baker's (Ada Nicodemou) house naked. Brad tries to help his sister Rachel (Amy Mathews) with her grief and organises Elaine's funeral. When Brad is locked out, Sally finds him naked again. Brad later saves her from a burning building. Emily Vincent (Libby Richmond), Brad's girlfriend arrives and they get married on the beach in a small ceremony but she dies of leukaemia, leaving him devastated. Brad and Sally grow closer, as she had lost her husband Flynn Saunders several months earlier. When Rocco Cooper (Ian Meadows) enrols at Summer Bay High, Brad is reluctant to give him a chance but Sally is willing. Rocco's brother, Johnny (Callan Mulvey) arrives and angers Brad. At Christmas. Brad and Sally share a kiss under the mistletoe and plan to have dinner together, but Sally does not arrive but is found bleeding outside of the school after being stabbed by Rocco on Johnny's orders. Sally recovers and she and Brad's bond strengthens when he moves in with her.

Naomi Preston (Tiffany Preece) arrives and Brad discovers her relationship with Lucas Holden (Rhys Wakefield). Naomi twists the story to make it look like Brad had knowledge of the relationship before she began teaching at the school. Brad is later stood down as principal but things look up when Sally accepts his marriage proposal. On the day of the wedding, Sally jilts Brad, leaving him hurt and he moves out. While on a boat trip with Alf Stewart (Ray Meagher), Ric Dalby (Mark Furze), Dan Baker (Tim Campbell) and Jack Holden (Paul O'Brien), a storm occurs and the men are lost at sea but return safely. Brad and Rachel later learn their father Robert (John Gregg) had an affair with Heather McCabe (Olivia Pigeot), resulting in a daughter, Tamsyn (Gabrielle Scollay), their half-sister. Heather leaves Tam with Rachel and Brad to attend a gambling rehab programme. They struggle to look after to Tam, as she defies Rachel's authority. Brad takes sole care of Tam but due to her behaviour he loses out on a job at Yabbie Creek High. He supports Sally when her daughter Pippa is hit by Alf's Ute. Heather returns and Brad decides to move to Tasmania and invites her and Tam to come with him and they accept.

For his portrayal of Brad, Sadrinna was nominated for Best Newcomer at the 2007 Inside Soap Awards Sadrinna and co-star Ritchie were also nominated for "Best Couple". The episode featuring Sally standing Brad up on their wedding day earned the episode's writer Margaret Wilson an Australian Writer's Guild award in 2008. The episode in which Brad becomes lost at sea earned a nomination in the category of "Best Single Episode" at the 2008 Digital Spy Soap Awards.

== Rocco Cooper ==
Rocco Cooper
- Home and Away character
- Portrayed by: Ian Meadows
- Duration: 2006–07
- First appearance: 11 October 2006
- Last appearance: 6 February 2007
In-universe information
- Occupation: Student
- Brothers: Johnny Cooper

Rocco Cooper, played by Ian Meadows, made his first appearance on 11 October 2006 and departed on 6 February 2007.

Rocco transfers to Summer Bay High when Sally Fletcher (Kate Ritchie) authorizes the move, overruling her boss, principal Brad Armstrong (Chris Sadrinna) who is concerned as Rocco is a former gang member. Sally convinces Brad that Rocco deserves a second chance. Rocco impresses them with hard work and dedication. Sally later offers him a place to live after discovering where he is living.

Johnny (Callan Mulvey), Rocco's older brother confronts him about leaving gang life behind and insists he cannot back out of his activities and threatens him with death. Rocco then provides an alibi for Johnny when he ransacks Brad's flat. The brothers commit further crimes but Rocco turns Johnny in to the police after staging a robbery on a Credit Union. After Johnny is arrested, Rocco visits him in prison and is ordered by Johnny to kill Sally or be killed himself. Racked with guilt, Rocco stabs Sally and leaves her for dead.

Sally survives the attack and Johnny is furious and threatens Rocco once more. Sally then remembers that Rocco stabbed her and her foster son, Ric Dalby (Mark Furze) is furious and confronts Rocco. Fearing for his life, Rocco contacts Johnny for help and arranges for him to stay at a safehouse. After getting the address from Johnny, Ric arrives only to find Rocco badly beaten. After several days in a coma, Rocco dies from his injuries. He is later buried in an unmarked grave with only Sally, Brad and Johnny (under police guard) attending. Ric is arrested and jailed for Rocco's murder but is released when Johnny is revealed to have arranged the murder.

The storyline involving Rocco stabbing Sally was nominated for "Best Storyline" at the 2007 Inside Soap Awards.

== Sam Holden ==
Sam Holden, played by Jessica Chapnik, made her first on-screen appearance on 17 October 2006. Chapnik secured the role of Sam by chance. In 2008, Chapnik quit the serial to pursue a career in the United States. She described Sam as an interesting character to play because she was "full of self-loathing and was so misunderstood". Sam was "doomed to fail from the beginning" and her "decline made sense" because she was always "quite tragic". Sam's "heaviness" made it hard for Chapnik to defend her actions, Chapnik also felt she had never experienced this with any other character. Eleven Magazine opined that Sam caused "quite a bit of chaos in the sleepy town of Summer Bay". Scott Ellis of the Sun-Herald said Sam was like a "murderous psycho".

== Johnny Cooper ==
Johnny Cooper, played by Callan Mulvey, made his first appearance on 19 October and departed on 25 March 2008. For his portrayal of Johnny, Mulvey was nominated in the category of "Best Bad Boy" at the Inside Soap Awards in 2007 and 2008, respectively.

== Rory Tolhurst ==
Rory Tolhurst
- Home and Away character
- Portrayed by: Ed Wills (2006–07); Jack Rickard (2007–08)
- Duration: 2006–08
- First appearance: 20 October 2006
- Last appearance: 14 April 2008
- Introduced by: Julie McGuaran
In-universe information
- Occupation: Student
- Father: Shane Deeks
- Mother: Sam Holden
- Stepfather: Jack Holden
- Sisters: Jessica Deeks
- Aunts: Britt Grey

Rory Holden (né Deeks, previously Tolhurst) made his first appearance on 20 October 2006 departed on 14 April 2008. Ed Willis first played the role in 2006 and Jack Rickard began playing the character on his return in 2007.

Rory is introduced to Jack Holden (Paul O'Brien) a patient of his mother Sam (Jessica Chapnik). They get along well and Jack begins dating Sam shortly after his recovery. The three of them begin living together. On the day of 'Summer Bay Nippers' Carnival', Rory is excited about Jack attending the event but is let down when Jack arrives late. Jack reassures him he will always be there for him. When Sam is kidnapped, Rory suspects something is wrong and tries to find her but is stopped by Jack's father, Tony (Jon Sivewright). Sam is found and she and Rory leave the bay.

Rory and Sam return to Summer Bay shortly after Sam breaks her ankle and Rory is happy to be back in the Bay. While Rory is babysat by Martha MacKenzie (Jodi Gordon) one day, he is kidnapped. The kidnapper is revealed to be his father, Shane Deeks (Mike Duncan) who has escaped from prison with the aid of a female accomplice. The police search for Rory, which results in a high-speed police chase in the river. Shane is killed but Rory is not with him but is found wet and unharmed. Following this, Rory considers Jack his father.

After failing to adjust to Year 5 at Summer Bay Primary, his teachers decide he is an advanced student and he is moved up to Year 7 at the High School. Rory is worried and on his first day several students pick on him but Aden Jefferies (Todd Lasance) sticks up for him in agreement for him switching the ballot papers for the election for the head of the formal committee. Aden wins but Cassie Turner (Sharni Vinson) and Matilda Hunter (Indiana Evans) uncover the truth and Deputy Principal Donald Fisher (Norman Coburn) puts Rory on detention. While on a school trip, Rory and Annie Campbell (Charlotte Best) sneak off during the trip but are left behind. They try walking home and are found by Cassie and Henk Van Minnen (Damian De Montemas), while hitch-hiking.

Jack and Sam get engaged and Rory is overjoyed. They try to keep the news low-key but Rory cannot contain his excitement and tells everybody. Rory writes a paper about Jack when he is set a writing assignment by a hero and is given an A+. To impress his friends, Rory steals Jack's gun and nearly shoots Dr. Lewis Rigg (Luke Carroll) on the beach. Rory is then upset when Martha tells Jack he should not be marrying Sam. He is then rude to her and begins behaving badly. In spite of everything, Rory gives his mother away to marry Jack. The stable family life does not last long when Sam finds herself attacked by Johnny Cooper (Callan Mulvey). Sam later takes Rory to stay with her sister, Britt Grey. Several weeks later Sam dies and Rory blames Jack, and tells him to stay away from Sam's funeral.

For his portrayal of Rory, Willis was nominated for a Digital Spy Award in 2008.

== Others ==
Date(s)	Character	Actor	Circumstances
24 January–28 February	Rebecca Tate	Janneke Arent	Rebecca is a former member of The Believers, a local Cult led by Mumma Rose (Linden Wilkinson). Robbie Hunter (Jason Smith) tracks her down when his wife Tasha (Isabel Lucas) falls in with the cult. Rebecca tells him that Mumma Rose attempted to make her "The Chosen One" by getting her son Jonah Abraham (James Mitchell) to impregnate her. She tries to warn Tasha but is kidnapped by the Believers and has her absence covered by a fake note. Martha MacKenzie (Jodi Gordon) discovers Rebecca imprisoned under a hatch at the Cult's camp site but is captured herself. Rebecca is later removed and allegedly drugged. However it is later revealed she is faking compliance in order to rescue Tasha. She helps Tasha and Jonah escape and phones the police but is not heard from again.
15 February–22 March	Brian Helpman	John Noble	Brian is a senior doctor at Northern Districts Hospital. He touches Rachel Armstrong's (Amy Mathews) arm in an appropriate manner, which is witnessed by Kim Hyde (Chris Hemsworth). Rachel dismisses this but as the closer she and Brian begin working together, the more his harassment escalates. He nominates Rachel for a medal and begins showering her with gifts of flowers and books. Rachel rejects Brian and he verbally chastises her, accusing her of being unprofessional. Brian then blackmails Rachel about her relationship with Kim while he was her patient and agrees not to disclose the information if she sleeps with him, which she refuses to do so. Brian is then reported to Geoff Olivetti (Barry Quin) the CEO of the hospital.
22 February–2 March	Judge Gilroy	Elizabeth Gentle	Gilroy is the Judge who presides over Alf Stewart's (Ray Meagher)'s trial for fraud. When jury find Alf guilty, she sentences him to nine months imprisonment.
2 March–13 April 2012	James Gibson	Richard Sydenham	Gibson is a police prosecutor at the local crown court. He first appears at Alf Stewart's trial in 2006 and later advises Angelo Rosetta (Luke Jacobz) to settle out of court. He is later present at Casey Braxton's (Lincoln Younes) arson trial and Sasha Bezmel's (Deni Harman) trial for the murder of Stu Henderson (Brenton Thwaites).
2 March–5 July 2009	Geoff Olivetti	Barry Quin	Geoff is the CEO of Northern Districts Hospital. He informs Rachel Armstrong (Amy Mathews) that she has been nominated for an award. When Rachel tells him that Brian Helpman has been blackmailing her over her relationship with Kim Hyde, Geoff tells her that he will have to suspend her pending an investigation. He later chastises nurse James Dalton (Gyton Grantley) for turning up to work high on marijuana and treats Kit Hunter (Amy Mizzi) during her pregnancy. He is also present when Rex Avent (Sandy Winton) brings a malpractice suit against Rachel, which is later dropped.
21–26 April	Robert Armstrong	John Gregg	Robert is Rachel and Brad Armstrong's (Chris Sadrinna) (Amy Mathews) estranged father. Rachel contacts him for advice after her superior Dr. Helpman (John Noble) begins harassing her. Robert tells her to ignore Helpman. He arrives to take the positional of Regional Director of Emergency at Northern Districts hospital and recommends Rachel for the position of Junior Registrar. Rachel introduces Robert to her boyfriend Kim Hyde (Chris Hemsworth) and they have dinner together. It emerges that Robert was responsible for a car accident involving him and Rachel's mother Elaine (Julie Hudspeth), leaving Elaine with acute amnesia. Robert reveals his ulterior motive; he needs Rachel's testimony to avoid a lawsuit following botched surgery. Rachel refuses but Robert states if she does not comply, He will be struck off and unable to afford the 24-hour care Elaine is receiving at the home. Robert is then banished from Rachel's life after she refuses to testify for him. It is later revealed Robert had an affair with Heather McCabe (Olivia Pigeot), resulting in a daughter, Tamsyn (Gabrielle Scollay)
21 April–5 November 2007	Ray Moran	Damien Garvey	Ray is Ric Dalby's (Mark Furze)'s boss at his garage, Moran Motors in Yabbie Creek. He tells Ric off over a scratch on a car he had been working on, the real culprit is Ray's nephew Dom (Sam North). When Ric tells Ray about Dom's irresponsible and dangerous behaviour around the garage, He refuses to do anything unless there is any proof. Ric is later crushed by a car when Dom gives him a faulty jack. Ray then fires Dom and apologises to Ric and offers to keep him on. Ray later hires Drew Curtis (Bobby Morley) as an apprentice but warns him to keep his car away from the premises as Dom, who is now working at the wreckers yard has supplied Drew with stolen parts. Drew informs the police and is fired. Ray then tells Dom to burn out the car. The following year, Ray lays Ric off as part of a scheme concocted by Noel Anderson (Steven Vidler) to force Ric into illegal bare-knuckle fighting.
25 April–20 June	Elaine Armstrong	Julie Hudspeth	Elaine is Rachel and Brad Armstrong's (Chris Sadrinna), mother. She suffers from acute amnesia from a car accident suffered four years earlier, caused by her husband Robert (John Gregg). Rachel and Kim Hyde (Chris Hemsworth) visit her at the nursing home. They take Elaine out for a picnic along with Robbie (Jason Smith) and Tasha Hunter (Isabel Lucas) but she wanders off. She is eventually found talking to Doris McKinnon (Julie Herbert) at her home. Elaine is returned to the home shortly after. She returns to attend the wedding of Jack Holden (Paul O'Brien) and Martha MacKenzie (Jodi Gordon) but is injured in a gas explosion and dies shortly after.
5 May–1 June	Doris McKinnon	Julie Herbert	Doris is first seen talking to Elaine Armstrong (Julie Hudspeth) when she wanders onto her property. Elaine's daughter, Rachel (Amy Mathews) gives Doris a check-up as she has been unwell for a while. When Rachel recommends she be hospitalised, Doris' grandson, Charlie (Matt Levett) is reluctant as his grandfather died in hospital but agrees. It emerges Doris has been taking her late husband's expired medication. Rachel gives her some morphine and Doris recovers but Charlie, enjoying freedom from caring for her, tops up her medication when Rachel leaves a discarded vial unattended. Doris then goes into cardiac arrest and dies as a result
5 May–6 June	Charlie McKinnon	Matt Levett	Charlie first appears when Rachel Armstrong (Amy Mathews) finds her mother Elaine (Julie Hudspeth) talking to his grandmother, Doris McKinnon (Julie Herbert). Charlie is reclusive and hostile at first but warms to Rachel after she treats Doris. Rachel suggests Doris be hospitalised and Charlie is reluctant as his grandfather died in a hospital but complies. He then turns to Rachel and her boyfriend Kim Hyde (Chris Hemsworth) for company and becomes attached to them. Charlie helps them for Dan Baker(Tim Campbell), who has gone missing following a head injury but when they find Dan, he becomes aggressive and knocks Charlie to the ground, cracking a rib. Rachel is able to save Charlie's life and he is grateful. Charlie begins spending more time with Kim and Rachel and supports Kim when the press pester him about his father Barry Hyde's (Ivar Kants) impending murder trial. His behaviour becomes obsessive to the point of dressing like Kim and turning up at his home unexpectedly. When Doris is ready to be discharged, Charlie is reluctant and tops up her morphine, which results in her dying of cardiac arrest. He then kidnaps Rachel and holds her hostage in the Surf Club gym with the intent to kill her. Kim then confronts Charlie and knocks him to floor and rescues Rachel. After a police interview, Charlie is sectioned at the Reefton Lakes psychiatric ward.
11 May–28 November	Lee Morton	Natasha Lee	Lee is a girl who Lucas Holden (Rhys Wakefield) meets during his rebellious phase. Lucas' friends and family take a dislike to Lee, especially Matilda Hunter (Indiana Evans) who find Lee in Lucas' bed. Lee reveals to Lucas she is pregnant and the father of her unborn baby is their Science teacher, Steve Braeburn (Sam Lyndon) and swears him to secrecy. The truth comes out and Steve tries to force Lee to have an abortion but is foiled and jailed. Lee leaves but returns several months later, near her due date and tells Lucas her parents did not react well to the news of the pregnancy. She goes into labor and gives birth to a son, Joe. Lee contemplates giving Joe up for adoption in order to keep her relationship with Dane Smith (Cody Kaye) and leaves him in Rachel Armstrong's (Amy Mathews) care. Lee returns several weeks later wanting Joe back after Dane dumps her. Rachel is reluctant to hand Joe over at first but decides to and Lee and Joe leave the bay.
23 May–20 June	Tracey Thompson	Sarah Enright	Tracey is a police detective who assists Peter Baker (Nicholas Bishop) in the case of the second Summer Bay stalker; Eve Jacobsen a.k.a. Zoe McCallister (Emily Perry). They tend to a bomb threat at Peter's apartment complex and tell the residents to clear before the bomb explodes but it is only alarm clock. Tracey often tells a visibly shaken Peter to keep calm during the investigation. More clues turn up and Tracey suggests to the residence of Summer Bay House to keep the information to themselves. Peter and Tracey eventually collar Eve and arrest her however, she appears at Jack Holden (Paul O'Brien) and Martha MacKenzie's (Jodi Gordon) wedding the following week with Tracey, who is revealed to be working with her. A gas explosion occurs as when cake with sparklers is brought into the tent and both Tracey and Eve are instantly killed in the blast.
5 June–23 March 2007	Kitty Landsdowne	Geraldine Turner	Kitty is Amanda Vale's (Holly Brisley) mother. She arrives in Summer Bay and tells Amanda she is suffering from cancer. Kitty meets Belle Taylor (Jessica Tovey), who is searching for her birth mother and tells her that she is grandmother and her birth mother has died. It emerges that Belle is Amanda's daughter she gave up for adoption as a teenager and Kitty told Amanda that Belle was stillborn when in fact she had sold her. Amanda then banishes her mother from her life. Kitty returns ahead of Amanda's wedding to Peter Baker (Nicholas Bishop) seemingly to reconcile with her but is in need of money after her manager has conned her. Kitty's other daughter, Kelli (Alexa Ashton) conspires to ruin Amanda's life and Kitty confronts her. Kelli offers Kitty $80,000 on the condition she keeps the secret and leaves the bay. Kitty refuses at first but when Kelli withholds her heart medication, she complies and leaves a letter for Amanda.
6 June–11 September	Evan Rice	Matthew Starling	Evan is a police constable at Yabbie Creek police station. He first appears during the investigation into the second Summer Bay Stalker. He tries to arrest Drew Curtis (Bobby Morley) for an arson attack at Summer Bay High but Belle Taylor (Jessica Tovey) owns up. Evan later arrests Robbie Hunter (Jason Smith) for turning off Graham Walters' (Doug Scroope) life support machine and issues Rachel Armstrong (Amy Mathews) with a restraining order from Tara O'Neill (Cashelle Dunn). It is later revealed that Evan has been blackmailed into framing Drew by Dennis Gillan (Danny Adcock). He is then charged with arson and accepting bribes.
15 June	David Taylor	Mark Pegler	David is Belle Taylor's (Jessica Tovey) adoptive father. He demands money from Belle's biological grandmother Kitty Landsdowne (Geraldine Turner) and threatens to tell Belle that Kitty's daughter Amanda Vale (Holly Brisley) is her real mother. Kitty reluctantly pays David off and he tries to give Belle some of the money but she rejects it, telling him to go to hell.
23 June–17 July	Colin Page	Shane Withington	Colin is the helicopter pilot who is scheduled to take Kim Hyde (Chris Hemsworth), Martha MacKenzie (Jodi Gordon), Kit (Amy Mizzi) and Robbie Hunter (Jason Smith) and Belle Taylor (Jessica Tovey) to a burns unit in the city. The helicopter crashes due to bad weather and the party are left stranded in the bush. Colin serves as a mediator among the group despite frequently arguing with Kim and comforts Belle. The group are eventually found and airlifted to hospital.
13–19 July	Steve Braeburn	Sam Lyndon	Steve is a science teacher at Summer Bay High. He begins an affair with one of students, Lee Morton (Natasha Lee) and impregnates her. Steve ends the relationship after his wife nearly finds out the truth and orders Lee to have an abortion while he takes a holiday with his wife and children. When Lucas Holden (Rhys Wakefield) finds out the truth about Steve and Lee, Steve threatens to make his and Lee's lives difficult. The truth is soon revealed and an enraged Steve tries to kidnap Lee but is foiled by Lucas' father, Tony (Jon Sivewright) who restrains him and Steve is arrested as a result.
3 August–1 May 2008	Betty Allsop	May Turner	Betty is an acquaintance of Colleen Smart (Lyn Collingwood). She attends Kim Hyde's (Chris Hemsworth) aerobics classes and later Kim's wedding to Rachel Armstrong (Amy Mathews). Colleen tries to set Betty up with Alf Stewart (Ray Meagher) but he is not interested. Betty faces Colleen in a bowls tournament but loses, However, it is revealed that Drew Curtis (Bobby Morley) and Belle Taylor (Jessica Tovey) have cheated to help Colleen win.
3 August–5 September	Tara O'Neill	Cashelle Dunn	Tara is a customer of the surf club gym. She forms an infatuation with her instructor Kim Hyde (Chris Hemsworth) and is upset when she finds out he is engaged to Rachel Armstrong (Amy Mathews). She then makes an allegation of sexual assault against Kim and even goes on the radio about it. Lara receives a medical test to prove what happened and the results do not reveal any evidence of Kim's DNA. Lucas Holden (Rhys Wakefield) confronts her about it and begins screaming and accuses him of attacking her. Tara's father, Gordon, a police officer refuses to believe his daughter would lie. Tara later admits she made up the allegations because she wanted attention from Gordon who had become a police officer and spent many hours working away from home.
3–28 August	Mel Harris	Sara Zwangobani	Mel is a counsellor at a camp for troubled teens where Matilda Hunter (Indiana Evans) attends in order to receive help for bulimia. Mel helps Matilda settle into the camp and introduces her to some of the other teens. She is later attacked by Vanessa (Emma Terracini), one of the girls at the retreat. Matilda later confides in Mel about some insecurities she had in childhood and Mel later tells her she has made enough progress to leave the retreat.
3 August–27 September	Dean Silverman	Gary Brun	Dean meets Matilda Hunter (Indiana Evans) at a retreat for trouble teens. They grow closer after a member of their group tries to commit suicide. Dean returns to Summer Bay with Matilda but her ex-boyfriend Lucas Holden (Rhys Wakefield) takes an instant dislike to him. Dean and Matilda later get together which upsets Lucas even more. Dean finds himself accused of an arson attack, having previous form but is later cleared. Lucas discovers Dean arguing and in an embrace with another boy, Gareth Westwood (Benjamin Ronczka) and confronts him about it. Dean denies it but later admits it to Matilda who tells him to patch things up with Gareth and he does. Before leaving, Dean arranges a romantic picnic for Lucas and Matilda as a farewell gift.
3–10 August	Vanessa Covacs	Emma Terracini	Vanessa attends the same retreat as Matilda Hunter (Indiana Evans) and Dean Silverman. She has many anger issues and attacks camp counsellor Mel Harris (Sara Zwangobani). It is revealed that Vanessa was sent to the retreat as she physically hurts her younger sister. One evening, Vanessa tries to commit suicide and is rushed to hospital. She is then transferred to a retreat better equipped to deal with her problems
18–23 August	Hal Enpace	Leigh Scully	Hal meets Lucas Holden (Rhys Wakefield) when he begins rebelling. He steals sandwich from Noah's bar and encourages Lucas to steal Beth Hunter's (Clarissa House) keys to the bar and they have an after party and trash the place in the process. Beth discovers the damaged and orders Hal to pay it off. Several days later Hal and his friend, Lawrence goad Lucas into graffiti tagging the lighthouse but they decide to vandalise Barry Hyde's (Ivar Kants) flat instead.
18–23 August	Lawrence	Uncredited	Lawrence is a friend of Hal Enpace (Leigh Scully).
21 August–15 September	Emily Armstrong	Libby Richmond	Emily is Brad Armstrong's (Chris Sadrinna) fiancée. She arrives in Summer Bay. It is quickly learned that Emily is dying of leukaemia. She and Brad marry quickly in a beach ceremony with Brad's family and friends. Her condition worsens over the next few weeks. and she spends her final hours with Brad at the headland before she dies peacefully in her sleep.
21 August–5 September	Gordon O'Neill	Andrew Tighe	Gordon is the local police superintendent at Yabbie Creek police station. He is enraged when his daughter Tara (Cashelle Dunn) tells him that Kim Hyde (Chris Hemsworth) sexually assaulted her. Despite Kim being cleared, He still wants him charged. When Gordon supports Tara in her campaign against Kim, Morag Bellingham (Cornelia Frances) warns them they could be in trouble if the claims are proven false. When Rachel Armstrong (Amy Mathews) tries to get Tara to drop the complaint, Gordon issues a restraining order against her. He believes Tara when she tells him Lucas Holden (Rhys Wakefield) also assaulted her. The truth is eventually revealed and Tara apologises for lying and Gordon apologises for neglecting her due to work commitments.
21 August–10 October	Ella Hunter	Zoe Littler, Indya Bottomsley, Paris Steen, Matina Commes, Toby Wormer, Jack Thompson	Ella is the newborn daughter of Tasha Hunter (Isabel Lucas), who she and her husband Robbie (Jason Smith) plan to raise as their own. Tasha struggles to bond with Ella at first as she is the product of a rape, believed to be committed by Jonah Abraham (James Mitchell). Jonah's mother, Mumma Rose (Linden Wilkinson) tries to kidnap Ella, believing she is "The Chosen One". Charity Fernbrook (Charlotte Gregg) kidnaps Ella but Tasha is able to foil Mumma Rose's plans. Robbie, Tasha and Ella then move to Boston. It is revealed in 2007 that Jonah is sterile, but it is never explained who raped Tasha instead.
28 August–27 September	Gareth Westwood	Benjamin Ronczka	Gareth visits Dean Silverman (Gary Brun) at a retreat for troubled teens. Dean introduces Gareth to Matilda Hunter (Indiana Evans) as his brother. It soon emerges that this is a lie after Drew Curtis (Bobby Morley) reveals that Dean does not have a brother. Lucas Holden (Rhys Wakefield) discovers that Dean and Gareth are a couple. Dean denies at first but then admits the truth to Matilda. Dean and Gareth patch up their relationship and move to the city together.
4 September	Grace Carter	Elaine Smith	Grace is the ex-wife of Gordon O'Neil (Andrew Tighe) and the mother of their daughter Tara (Cashelle Dunn). When Morag Bellingham (Cornelia Frances) visits Grace, she admits that Tara has lied and played similar games in the past to get Gordon's attention and agrees to give evidence if the case against Kim Hyde (Chris Hemsworth) goes to court.
16 October	Dennis Gillen	Danny Adcock	Dennis is a criminal adversary of Peter Baker (Nicholas Bishop). He is intent on getting revenge on Peter for his wife's murder in prison as Peter was the detective who brought down the Gillen family. Dennis is paroled and comes after Peter with several henchmen. Peter tells his son Drew Curtis (Bobby Morley) to flee and a gunshot is heard. Peter is thought to be killed but he turns up alive and well, meaning Dennis is the one who has died.
17 October–7 February 2007	Ash Nader	Ben Geurens	Ash is a police colleague and friend of Jack Holden (Paul O'Brien). He meets Jack's estranged wife Martha MacKenzie (Jodi Gordon) at Noah's bar and spends the night with her. Martha is shocked to learn that Jack and Ash know each other. Ash securers a transfer to Yabbie Creek Police Station and begins a relationship with Martha. Morag Bellingham (Cornelia Frances), Martha's great aunt takes a dislike to Ash and discovers he had previously balked on his responsibilities. He comes to Martha but Morag is still convinced he is hiding something. Morag discovers Ash is married to a woman named Rianna (Lotte St. Clair) and has two children, Declan and Jess. He tries to keep his secret but Rianna and the children arrive in the bay to surprise him, leaving no choice but to confess to Martha. However, Ash tells her he will leave his wife but continues to live his double life. Martha then ends things with Ash and he returns to his family.
30 October–28 November, 19 September–3 October 2008	Joe Morton	Declan Ransley, Justin Martin, Olivia Barclay, Sayer Long, Rafferty Grierson, Cooper Brittian, Henry Lucas, Marley Cooke	Joe is Lee Morton's (Natasha Lee) newborn son. His mother quickly abandons him and runs off with her boyfriend Dane Smith (Cody Kaye), so Rachel Armstrong (Amy Mathews) takes care of him and bonds with him. Lee returns several weeks later, deciding she wants him back and Rachel hands Joe over to her and they leave. The next time Joe is seen, Dane brings him to hospital and Rachel discovers Joe has bruises and suspects Dane has been hitting him. Further test reveal Joe is suffering from bone cancer. Dane takes him to find Lee against Rachel's advice and they leave. Joe's condition worsens and he later dies.
31–24 October 2008	Dane Smith	Cody Kaye	Dane is Lee Morton's (Natasha Lee) boyfriend. He leaves Lee to support her baby alone as he is on the run from the police. Dane arrives at the hospital to see Lee but is unhappy when he learns she thinking of keeping the baby and threatens to leave her if she does not put the child up for adoption. Lee leaves baby Joe in Rachel Armstrong's (Amy Mathews) care and flees to Queensland with Dane. He later dumps Lee at a medical centre after she collapses. Dane returns two years later with Joe and mentions that he and Lee have reconciled but she has gone to visit some friends. Joe's bruises are a concern for Rachel and suspects Dane of hitting him, much to his disgust. However, tests reveal Joe is suffering from Bone cancer. Dane takes Joe to find Lee, against Rachel's advice. He returns several weeks later to tell Rachel that Joe has died.
27 November–	Reverend	Peter Flett	A local priest at St. James' Church who marries Kim Hyde (Chris Hemsworth) and Rachel Armstrong (Amy Mathews). He later officiates the wedding of Bianca Scott (Lisa Gormley) and Vittorio Seca (Richard Brancatisano), which does not go ahead. In early 2011, he conducts the funeral of Ross Buckton (David Downer) and marries Roo Stewart (Georgie Parker) and Harvey Ryan (Marcus Graham) in 2012. The Reverend reappears in late 2013 to conduct the wedding of Dexter Walker (Charles Cottier) and April Scott (Rhiannon Fish). Three years later, the Priest conducts Charlotte King's (Erika Heynatz) funeral.
1 December–7 February 2007	Rianna Nader	Lotte St. Claire	Rianna is Ash Nader's wife (Ben Guerens). She arrives in the Bay with their children, Declan and Jess, to visit him. Rianna meets Martha MacKenzie (Jodi Gordon), but is unaware Ash has been seeing her. Rianna later falls pregnant and Ash returns home to be with her.
1 December–7 February 2007	Declan Nader	Jack Concoran	Rianna is Ash Nader's wife (Ben Guerens). She arrives in the Bay with their children, Declan and Jess, to visit him. Rianna meets Martha MacKenzie (Jodi Gordon), but is unaware Ash has been seeing her. Rianna later falls pregnant and Ash returns home to be with her.
1 December–7 February 2007	Jessica Nader	Amy Baran	Rianna is Ash Nader's wife (Ben Guerens). She arrives in the Bay with their children, Declan and Jess, to visit him. Rianna meets Martha MacKenzie (Jodi Gordon), but is unaware Ash has been seeing her. Rianna later falls pregnant and Ash returns home to be with her.
