= Matilda Hunter =

- Home and Away character
- Portrayed by: Indiana Evans
- Duration: 2004–2008
- First appearance: 21 January 2004
- Last appearance: 24 July 2008
- Introduced by: Julie McGauran
In-universe information
- Occupation: Student
- Father: Jack Hunter
- Mother: Beth Hunter
- Stepfather: Rhys Sutherland
- Brothers: Scott Hunter; Robert Hunter; Henry Hunter
- Sisters: Kit Hunter
- Grandfathers: Graham Walters
- Nephews: Noah Hunter; Archie Hunter Hyde
- Nieces: Ella Hunter

Matilda Hunter is a fictional character from the Australian soap opera Home and Away, played by Indiana Evans. She made her first on-screen appearance on 21 January 2004. Matilda is the daughter of Beth and Jack Hunter and sister to Scott, Kit, Robbie and Henry. Matilda departed on 24 July 2008 to go to university.

== Casting ==
Evans was filming the television show Snobs when she was asked to audition for the role of Matilda on Home and Away. Her agents told her that she had won the part and Evans said "I had been watching Home and Away for quite a while, so joining the cast was quite weird. The show is so fast-paced and at first it was overwhelming but at the same time was quite laid back."

In April 2008, it was announced that Evans was to leave Home and Away after she turned down the producers offering to renew her contract.

== Development ==
=== Characterisation ===
Matilda is described as a "bit of a snobby brat" who can also be a "drama queen". However, she is not necessarily mean. Matilda is angry when her mother begins dating another man shortly after her father Jack Hunter (Ian Lind) dies. After she settles in the Bay, Matilda develops some "desperate" crushes on some of the boys in the area. Channel Seven said these are all learning curves for Matilda.

=== Kidnap ===
Matilda begins partying and befriends Callan Sherman (Kain O'Keeffe). She is later hospitalised when she is hit by a car during a night out. Shortly after, Callan encourages Matilda to leave the hospital and go to a party, where he slips a date rape drug into her drink. However, before he can assault her, Ric Dalby (Mark Furze) appears and pulls him away. Of his character's involvement, Furze stated "Matilda has been going off the rails lately, and Ric has been trying to bring her into line. And as soon as he heard that Matilda was at a party with Callan, Ric knew that she was in danger. That's why he tracked her down." As Ric and Callan fight, a drowsy Matilda leaves the party and gets into a stranger's car. As Ric is blamed for Matilda's disappearance, a search party is organised to find Matilda. Furze said Ric feels bad because he thinks she will not be herself due to the drug Callan gave her. He attempts to join in the search, but Matilda's mother blames him for leading her daughter astray. Meanwhile, Matilda wakes up in "a ramshackle shed" in the bush and she realises someone has locked her in. Furze commented that the chances of her being found were not looking good. Matilda is eventually found after escaping her kidnapper Terry Rawlings (Laurence Coy).

=== Bulimia ===
In 2006, Matilda developed bulimia. She was seen binge eating, before making herself vomit. She later broke down in her mother's arms and she ended up in hospital. The show's writing department and a medical adviser worked with eating disorder experts for the scripts. Channel Seven said "Our writers and producers are always speaking to experts in a particular field and those that have experienced an issue. Naturally, each actor also adds input to the character, performance and the storyline." During the storyline, Matilda's mother Beth Hunter (Clarissa House) calls the Eating Disorders Foundation of Victoria's helpline, which prompted many calls to the foundation from younger viewers of the show. Bridget McManus of The Sydney Morning Herald said that some of the viewers had identified with Matilda's condition and had sought help, others had found the scenes so distressing that they needed support to stop themselves from doing the same thing.

Sarah Walker, an assistant with the Victorian Centre for Excellence in Eating Disorders, had reservations about the storyline concluding too quickly as people with eating disorders often go for years without asking for help. She explained that it was "essential" Home and Away handled the story well and that it "could encourage people to seek help." Ian Lang, a professor at the Victorian College of the Arts also expressed his view on the storyline concluding quickly. He said, "I think anybody who has suffered a serious illness like bulimia knows that it's not possible to really portray it in a half-hour drama." Rick Kausman of the Australian Medical Association spoke to groups of high school students in Geelong and said the storyline was raised by the students. Of this, he said "The whole upside to this is, we've got to get it out to the community that this is a health issue that's not unusual, it's not isolated." Frances Sanders of the Eating Disorders Foundation of Victoria was concerned that someone at risk of developing bulimia may see the show and try it. She thought that it was good that Home and Away was addressing the issue though, as viewers would think they need to get some help. She said the resolution of Matilda's problem would be important." McManus thought it was "unreasonable" to expect Matilda's storyline to continue for over eight to ten years, but Matilda would have issues with food for the rest of her life. Sanders added that this character development would make her "normal".

== Storylines ==
Matilda is first seen along with her twin brother, Henry, when they arrive at the caravan park to return home to live with their mother Beth and stepfather-to-be, Rhys Sutherland (Michael Beckley). Matilda is initially unimpressed with the bay, as she is used to a posh boarding school and is frequently rude and sarcastic to Rhys' daughters Dani (Tammin Sursok), Kirsty (Christie Hayes) and Jade (Kate Garven) and nephew, Max (Sebastian Elmaloglou). One afternoon, Matilda suffers an electric shock from her brother Robbie's (Jason Smith) invention and is hospitalized. Shortly after being discharged, Matilda and Henry begin scamming people by pretending Matilda can see into the future.

Matilda later tries to attract the attentions of the much older Kim Hyde (Chris Hemsworth) and even fakes drowning to get him to notice her. However, this backfires when Matilda struggles for real and Kim is forced to save her. After recovering, Kim tells Matilda he has no feelings for her, leaving her devastated. When Beth and Rhys separate at the end of the year, the Hunters swap houses with Flynn Saunders (Joel McIlroy) and Sally Fletcher (Kate Ritchie). After overhearing a conversation between Kim and Robbie in which Kim tells Robbie he likes one of his sisters, Matilda immediately assumes it's her until she finds out it's her older sister Kit (Amy Mizzi).

Matilda later begins a friendship with Ric Dalby, who had bullied Henry previously and tries to make a move on him but he rejects her advances and begins dating Cassie Turner (Sharni Vinson). After feeling rejected, Matilda then begins sneaking out to wild parties and rock concerts. This behaviour culminates in her almost being date-raped by Callan Sherman.

The Holden family moves to Summer Bay, next door to the Hunters, and Matilda befriends the youngest son, Lucas (Rhys Wakefield). they are soon cast as the leads in Colleen Smart's (Lyn Collingwood) pantomime. After they share their first kiss on stage, Matilda and Lucas become a couple but their relationship ultimately ends shortly after both their families move into one house as their respective single parents Beth and Tony (Jon Sivewright) are dating.

Matilda is chosen to be Martha MacKenzie's (Jodi Gordon) bridesmaid for her wedding to Lucas' older brother Jack (Paul O'Brien). The day is marred by an explosion caused by Eve Jacobsen (Emily Perry), which leaves Matilda very badly burned. She then later develops bulimia after disgust with her body image following the explosion. Matilda collapses one day and then agrees to go to retreat for people with similar issues. While there she meets Dean Silverman (Gary Brun), who she begins dating. Lucas is suspicious of Dean and is shocked when he finds him hugging his ex-boyfriend, Gareth Westwood (Benjamin Ronczka) in a secluded spot. Matilda refuses to believe this at first but then is devastated when she finds the truth.

As 2007 begins, Matilda begins dating Ric, who has not long broken up with Cassie. Beth disapproves at first but eventually comes around. When Ric is imprisoned for murdering Rocco Cooper (Ian Meadows), Matilda stands by him. Ric is eventually released after the real culprit is found and the two resume their relationship. After Beth is killed in a head-on car crash, Matilda, Kit and Tony are left devastated. Soon after, Kit leaves and Matilda feels abandoned as she is the only member of her family left in the bay. This takes a toll on her schoolwork and Matilda fails her HSC and opts to repeat Year 12 the following year.

Matilda later finds out that Ric has been cheating on her with Viv Anderson (Simone McAullay) and later dumps him. They are later reunited but it is cut short when Matilda is accepted to a University in Perth and leaves immediately. Ric, on the advice of his grandfather, Alf Stewart (Ray Meagher) follows her there and finds Nathan Cunningham (Andrew Lees), the resident adviser in her bed. Ric prepares to return to Summer Bay but Matilda stops him and they have a heart-to-heart and reconcile.

== Reception ==
For her portrayal of Matilda, Evans was nominated for "Best Young Actor" at the 2007 Inside Soap Awards. The following year, Evans received two nominations for "Sexiest Female" and "Best Couple", along with co-star Mark Furze. At the 2008 Dolly Teen Choice Awards, Evans won the "Queen of Teen" award.
