= Lucas Holden =

- Home and Away character
- Portrayed by: Rhys Wakefield
- Duration: 2005–2008
- First appearance: 5 August 2005
- Last appearance: 14 February 2008
- Introduced by: Julie McGauran
In-universe information
- Occupation: Student at Summer Bay High; University student; Writer
- Father: Tony Holden
- Mother: Kate Holden
- Stepmother: Rachel Armstrong
- Brothers: Jack Holden
- Half-brothers: Harry Holden
- Aunts: Gina Austin
- First cousins: Hugo Austin; Brendan Austin; Xavier Austin

Lucas Holden is a fictional character from the Australian television soap opera Home and Away, played by Rhys Wakefield. The character made his first screen appearance on 5 August 2005. Lucas was the youngest member of Holden family. Wakefield left the show in 2008.

== Casting ==
Wakefield joined the cast when he was 16 years old. He had experience working on stage, but the role marked his first television job. He had to learn to work with the camera, as well as balance his schoolwork with filming. Of being cast, he stated "I was surprised! It was totally unexpected. I feel so lucky to have landed a role on such a big show, and I hope it will be a stepping stone in my career." Wakefield was introduced alongside Jon Sivewright and Paul O'Brien, who play his father Tony Holden and brother Jack Holden respectively.

Following his departure in 2008, the producers asked Wakefield to return for a short stint. The actor said they were unable to work out the scheduling and he did not appear.

== Storylines ==
Lucas arrives in Summer Bay with his father Tony (Jon Sivewright) and brother Jack (Paul O'Brien). He quickly makes friends with Ric Dalby (Mark Furze), Cassie Turner (Sharni Vinson) and Matilda Hunter (Indiana Evans). When Colleen Smart (Lyn Collingwood) puts on a production of "Rex and Summer" at the Surf Club, Lucas and Matilda star opposite each other as the leads and fall for each other. Their every attempt to kiss is interrupted but they finally manage to kiss during the play. Lucas and Matilda's relationship is stable until Lucas goes off the rails, trashing Jack's car in a game of dare and then paintballing Amanda Vale (Holly Brisley). After receiving an offer on their houses from Josh West's (Daniel Collopy) Project 56 scheme, Tony and Matilda's mother Beth (Clarissa House) decide to move in together, meaning that Matilda and Lucas would be living together. Problems begin to arise in Lucas and Matilda relationship due to Lucas' developing friendship with new girl Belle which Matilda disapproved of. The two split up and Lucas went on a road of self-destruction by getting involved in vandalism in the bay. After Jack's scare tactic of having him brought to the police station for his act of vandalism in Barry Hyde home, Lucas shares his troubles with Beth saying that since she has moved into the family has made him realise how much he missed his decreased mother and by accepting Beth into a mothering role he worried he would forget about his real mom. Beth reassure Lucas that no-one will ever replace his mom and things calm down.

During Lucas's vandalism day he encounters a girl called Lee and she is even caught in bed during this time causing more friction between Matilda and Lucas. Lucas reassures Matilda that nothing happened and that he slept on the floor while Lee stayed over. Things seemed to look good for Lucas and Matilda up until the fire at Jack and Martha's wedding, leaving Matilda with burn scars and feeling self-conscious over her looks. Matilda is also dealing with the stress of her missing siblings Robbie and Kit, who were involved in a plane crash, and needed Lucas' support. However at the same time Lee has returned, saying that she is pregnant with a school teacher's baby and needs Lucas' help. Taking pity on Lee, Lucas helps Lee, going along with her claim that he is the father of her baby when Tony and Sally discover she is expecting. This lie hurts Matilda deeply as she believed Lucas when he said nothing happened when Lee stayed over. This also encourages her belief that she ugly due to her scars and self-esteem issues. When Lee tries to explain Lucas' innocence, Matilda uncovers the truth and tells Tony the whole story, clearing Lucas' name. While Matilda tries to apologise she insults Lucas who accuses Matilda of being selfish and not really caring about Lee. After this Matilda's bulimia begins to develop and she ends up in hospital, not wanting any help from anyone, until Lucas tells her that the belief that she has that is nothing isn't true and that she was the best thing to ever happen to him. Matilda seeks the help she ends and goes away to a camp to resolve her issue. Before she leaves Lucas tells her he will be waiting for her when she comes back.

When Matilda begins seeing Dean Silverman (Gary Brun), a guy she met at the retreat for Bulimia. Lucas warns her that Dean is not what he seems, and tries to convince her further after he sees him embracing another man, but Matilda writes it off as jealousy. Dean eventually confesses and Matilda and Lucas grow closer again and share a kiss but both admit their feelings have gone and agree to be friends. Lucas then begins seeing Belle Taylor (Jessica Tovey), who has recently split from her boyfriend Drew Curtis (Bobby Morley) and loses his virginity to her. However, it does not last and Drew and Belle's reunion is exposed by Drew's ex, Lisa Duffy (Jessica McNamee), breaking Lucas' heart. Lucas refuses to forgive either of them at first but he later heads off on a writer's course and eventually forgives them when he returns following Beth's shocking death.

Lucas is happy when Naomi Preston (Tiffany Preece), a girl he met on the writer's course turns up but he is shocked when he learns she will be his teacher at Summer Bay High and she is equally stunned to find Lucas is not a University Student as he told her. Naomi quickly ends things with Lucas but he refuses to give up and confides in Ric and Tony. It is soon revealed in a letter that Naomi had slept with a grieving Tony and Lucas exposes the information to a devastated Matilda and her sister Kit (Amy Mizzi). Lucas then goes on a drink binge and is hospitalised. He recovers but refuses to forgive Tony who decides to move out. Ric helps him see sense and Lucas and Tony repair their relationship.

Geoff Campbell (Lincoln Lewis) makes an enemy of Lucas when he informs Tony that Lucas took out a boat and sank it. The hostilities escalate when Geoff finds favour with Tony by joining the football team. Lucas tries out in order to impress Tony but fails when he viciously tackles Geoff, leading to more arguments. Sally Fletcher (Kate Ritchie) asks Lucas to help Geoff's younger sister, Annie (Charlotte Best) with her studies as a tutor but when Annie disappears and is found asleep on Lucas' bed, her grandfather, Bruce (Chris Haywood) gets the wrong idea. When Bruce locks Annie in her room at the farm, Lucas rescues her and reluctantly agrees to help Geoff who has nowhere else to go.

When Lisa reappears, she apologises for humiliating him over Drew and Belle's affair and she and Lucas begin seeing each other. However, Lisa's ex-boyfriend Denni Maitland (Josh Helman) refuses to let her go. Lucas rescues Lisa by stealing Ric's car keys and Denni follows in hot pursuit and tries to force them off the road, causing them to crash. Lisa dies as a result of her head injuries leaving Lucas devastated. Lucas and Denni blame each other and Lucas tries to Smother Denni with a pillow but is restrained by Tony. After a quiet Summer, Lucas prepares to pack up and leave for University. When news of Jack's death reaches him, he is unable to attend the funeral as he is overseas.

== Reception ==
For his portrayal of Lucas, Wakefield was nominated for Most Popular New Male Talent at the 2006 Logie Awards. Of the character, a reporter for the Evening Chronicle said "Lucas is one of those teenagers who, when he sulks, looks like he's been sucking lemons for a week. The reporter added that Lucas was a "stroppy lad" and that when Tony told him to shut up, it was "a beautiful moment". In October 2007, Home and Away and the Seven Network were rapped by the ACMA for broadcasting "raunchy scenes" in G-rated episodes, following complaints from viewers. One such episode was 4358, which aired on 21 February 2007, and featured Belle and Lucas's decision to have sex. Some scenes shown saw the couple in bed together as they discussed what had happened between them. The regulator said "ACMA found that verbal references to sex and visual depictions of sexual behaviour contained in the episode were not brief or infrequent. It also considered that the programme's treatment of the theme of teenage sexuality was not very mild in impact. ACMA therefore determined that Seven incorrectly classified the programme G, and that it breached the code in relation to this broadcast."
