= Dan Baker (Home and Away) =

- Home and Away character
- Portrayed by: Tim Campbell
- Duration: 2004–2007
- First appearance: 1 September 2004
- Last appearance: 28 November 2007
- Introduced by: Julie McGauran
- Book appearances: Home and Away: Mayday
In-universe information
- Occupation: Counsellor; Teacher
- Father: Kevin Baker
- Mother: Noelene Baker
- Brothers: Peter Baker
- Wife: Amanda Vale (1998–2005); Leah Patterson (2005–2008)
- Sons: Ryan Baker
- Stepsons: VJ Patterson
- Nephews: Drew Curtis

Daniel David "Dan" Baker is a fictional character from the Australian Channel Seven soap opera Home and Away, played by Tim Campbell. The actor has appeared in the series prior to taking the regular role of Dan in 2004. Dan is characterised as a "likeable, committed and passionate" man. He grew up in a small rural town and developed a liking for nature. Dan is a school councilor and many of his storylines involve his family unit. Dan's most prominent relationship is shared with Leah Patterson-Baker (Ada Nicodemou). But their relationship is tested following the introduction of Dan's ex-wife Amanda Vale (Holly Brisley). She claims that Dan used to hit her and even attempts to sabotage his wedding. He is the brother of Peter (Nicholas Bishop) a police officer whose occupation endangers Dan's life. He also has to deal with a gambling addiction, which Campbell carried out research to portray.

Campbell decided to leave the show in 2007 and filmed his final scenes on 5 October. The character was killed in an abseiling accident off-screen. Writers deemed the exit the only plausible option due to the popularity of Dan and Leah's relationship. Critics from the Birmingham Mail, The Sun-Herald and The Newcastle Herald have praised the role only because of Dan's attractive appearance, while writers from the Sunday Mercury criticised Dan and Leah's on-screen partnership.

== Casting ==
Campbell joined the cast of Home and Away as Dan in 2004. He originally auditioned for the role of Peter Baker, which was given to Nicholas Bishop. The producers then contacted Campbell and offered him the role of Peter's brother. They told him that the character was "going to hang around for a while", which suited Campbell and he immediately accepted the role. The actor had previously appeared in the series playing the role of Brad, a soccer player for Yabbie Creek.

== Development ==
=== Characterisation ===
The writer for the serial's official website described him as a "likeable, committed, passionate, with a great sense of joviality and humour, [...] a balanced, well-rounded guy. He is keen on the outdoors and has an "affinity with nature" because he grew up in a "small rural town". Dan is said to cherish his childhood memories of camping with his father Kevin (Andy Anderson) and brother Peter (Nicholas Bishop). While growing up he was "fiercely competitive" against Peter, but was still "easy-going". Dan stays in Summer Bay after he falls for "the quirk and charm of the town". He works as Student Counsellor at Summer Bay High, a career that is his "primary passion in life".

In an interview published on the website Campbell called his character a "no nonsense" type of person. Dan has some issues to resolve, but he does not let it interfere with his lifestyle. He continued: "I think he is a likeable and fun guy, and when faced with conflict, Dan is good in finding a quick resolve between himself and other people." Dan is "pretty grounded and has great integrity", he is also "even-tempered", which Campbell said he could relate to. But Dan tends to get "very belligerent" towards his ex-wife Amanda Vale (Holly Brisley) and the actor occasionally apologised to Brisley for how he was required to act. Campbell enjoyed portraying Dan's gambling addiction because it challenged him as an actor. Campbell researched the issue and felt it was "something different" to work on.

=== Relationships ===
Dan develops romantic feelings for Leah Patterson (Ada Nicodemou) and they kiss. Leah has to overcome her guilt and move on from her former husband Vinnie Patterson (Ryan Kwanten). Nicodemou told a reporter from Inside Soap that Leah's attraction to Dan is a difficult one because she is unsure whether Vinnie is alive or dead. "But after some soul-searching [...] she chooses to make a go of things with Dan instead." Their relationship is a "big deal" to Leah because she needs someone reliable enough for a long-term relationship because of her son, VJ Patterson (Felix Dean). But Leah's confidence in Dan is tested when Amanda claims that Dan used to domestically abuse her and has an active restraining order. Nicodemou explained that "it turns out Amanda has been telling people that Dan used to hit her." Leah is "shocked" and because Dan is reluctant to talk about Amanda, she begins to question if Dan is hiding the truth. She concluded that "Dan does not seem capable of violence" but Dan's behaviour had already worried Leah before.

In the lead up to the couple's wedding, Amanda begins to sabotage their plans. Nicodemou told an Inside Soap correspondent that all the wedding preparations have gone wrong since Amanda's arrival. Leah thinks that it is sign she should not marry Dan. He convinces her that "the main thing is that they love each other" and everyone helps to reorganise the day. Amanda appears to be doing everything to help Dan and Leah, but she is secretly still trying to ruin the event. Nicodemou added that "despite the fact that nothing goes as planned on the wedding day, it turns out better than Dan and Leah could have hoped." Campbell told a reporter from the serial's official website that he had "a lot of fun" with Dan and Leah's wedding because it was "casual". It had "light and funny" elements due to their parents arriving and "fighting". In one scene Dan sang to Leah, Campbell enjoyed the opportunity but found it "nerve wracking" singing in front of the cast. He added that he had a love for his pairing with Nicodemou because they "clicked straight away".

In one storyline, Dan faces danger from armed drug dealers after he discovers an under cover police operation. Campbell told a reporter from Inside Soap that Dan becomes suspicious of Peter when he randomly reappears in Summer Bay and Scott Hunter (Kip Gamblin) claims to have seen him with drugs. Dan and Scott track Peter down and he confronts him. Campbell said that Dan catches Peter surrounded by drugs paraphernalia and he confesses her is attempting to arrest drug dealers. But the criminals arrive at the destination and Peter tells him to hide. Then "all hell breaks loose [... as] Dan makes a noise and the dealers realise he's there. Scott hears a gunshot from outside." But the bullet hits Peter, who goes on to survive the attack.

=== Departure ===
On 30 September 2007, Fiona Byrne from the Herald Sun reported that Campbell would be leaving the series. He filmed his final scenes on 5 October. He told Marcus Casey from The Daily Telegraph that he was unsure as to whether he made the right decision to leave. He added that the serial had been a "fantastic place" to work and was excited to pursue other projects. Campbell said that the producers did not want him to leave because of Dan's "established relationship" Leah. He explained further that "it will be an unfortunate storyline, he doesn't get killed off - he gets a job offer he can't refuse and leaves Summer Bay behind."

However, in the months following his departure, Dan was killed off-screen in America, trying to save a student in an abseiling accident. Writers faced "quandary" because Dan and Leah were so popular that the only plausible exits were to infidelity or kill the character off. Campbell told Steve Dow of The Sun-Herald that the "viewers' moral sensibilities were actually being spared". Upon watching Dan's funeral scenes the actor added: "I teared up because I felt really responsible". Nicodemou told an Inside Soap reporter that Dan's death shocks Leah because she was going to visit him. She added "Dan's on the other side of the world so it doesn't seem real [...] she didn't get a chance to say goodbye."

Campbell, who came out as gay towards the end of his stint, said it would have been interesting to see if he they would have cast him knowing about his sexuality. He said that viewers did not mind because they still approached him saying "oh, I miss Leah and Dan, they were such a great couple."

== Storylines ==
Dan arrives in Summer Bay after hearing that his brother, Peter is comatose following an armed siege against Sarah Lewis (Luisa Hastings-Edge). He soon takes a job at the local school as a teacher and a counsellor. Dan takes an interest in Leah Patterson and begins a relationship with her, despite the fact her husband Vinnie (Ryan Kwanten) is alive in witness protection. When Peter wakes from his coma both he and Dan compete for Leah's affections. Dan is successful and Peter steps aside. He later proposes to Leah after the dissolution of her marriage to Vinnie and she accepts but Dan is still married to his ex, Amanda Vale and they have to wait for the divorce to come through. Following a seaplane crash with many of their friends, Dan proposes to Leah again and gives her a ring. They also find Ric Dalby (Mark Furze) who has been living rough.

Amanda's arrival with Dan's six-year-old son, Ryan (Isaac Gorman) in tow proves to be a testing time when Amanda tries to sabotage the wedding and Ryan takes an instant dislike to Leah and is frequently naughty. In spite of these matters, they marry with their friends and family present and Dan performs an impromptu version of "Soul Kind of Feeling" at the reception. Weeks into the marriage, Dan relapses into a previous gambling problem and his debts stack up. Leah learns they are unable to have children and considers IVF; Dan takes the money to pay his debts. Leah is angry and upset further when she is kidnapped by Dan's creditor, Dudley Shepherd (Terry Serio) and they separate after she is rescued. They reunite briefly when Leah is revealed to be pregnant but things are strained when Dan discovers she kissed Peter after overhearing a conversation. Leah later loses the baby.

Dan is devastated by the loss of the baby and tries to distance himself from his wife and sleeps with Amanda. He instantly regrets it but is not ready to return to Leah. Dan moves in with Kim Hyde (Chris Hemsworth) and Jack Holden (Paul O'Brien), but realises he misses Leah. However, Leah refuses to take Dan back after learning of his infidelity and Amanda takes Ryan back to America with her. Dan begins drinking heavily. While babysitting Leah's son, VJ, Dan falls asleep and when he awakes he finds him unconscious. Leah is furious and Dan takes off in his car and hits a tree. He recovers but has a major swelling on his brain, which causes him to act out of character, including trashing Leah's house and kissing Sally Fletcher (Kate Ritchie). Dan hallucinates and sees visions of Ryan which cause him to wander off into the bush. He is later found and hospitalised.

When Peter is presumed dead in an explosion, Dan tracks down his son Drew Curtis (Bobby Morley) and invites him to live with him. Dan is shocked when he learns Drew has fallen for Amanda and tries to discourage the affair. More shocks follow when it is revealed that Peter did not die in the explosion. Dan is initially furious but grows closer to Peter. There is some friction when Peter and Amanda begin a relationship but things settle. Dan spends the next few months trying to keep Drew on the straight and narrow. Bored with life in the bay, Dan looks for a fresh challenge. He secretly looks for a new job. Leah is suspicious and believes he is having an affair when she sees him with Gwen Stacy (Saskia Smith). Dan reveals to her that he has been given the job in America and Leah, resistant at first, agrees to follow Dan in a few months after he is settle and Dan leaves the Bay. Leah sells her share of the Diner to Roman Harris (Conrad Coleby) and prepares for the move, but she receives a phone call telling her Dan has died in an abseiling accident while in America. A Memorial service is held for Dan in the Bay. They learn that Dan died while saving the life of the son of Steve Bradford (Nicholas Holland), who gives Leah $100,000 to set up a memorial for him. Leah purchases a new diner with a section called the Den as a social club.

== Reception ==
The episode in which Dan becomes lost at sea earned a nomination in the category of "Best Single Episode" at the 2008 Digital Spy Soap Awards. Jim Schembri of The Age said that Dan "unintentionally emasculated" Jesse McGregor (Ben Unwin) by making Leah "so happy so quickly". Marc McEvoy said that "fans are sure to fall about in a swoon" watching the drama unfold between Dan, Leah and Jesse. A writer from the Birmingham Mail chose the episode in which Dan is released from hospital and trashes his house in their "pick of the day" feature. George Liondis from The Sun-Herald said that Campbell was a "Home and Away hunk" and a "soapie sex god"; Sarah-Kate Scicluna of The Newcastle Herald named him the "Home and Away heart-throb". A columnist writing for the Sunday Mercury said that Dan and Leah's romance conformed to soap's relationship cliche; "Dan and Leah love each other but can't reveal their feelings because of hurt pride." They explained that "the way stories are drawn out by constant misunderstandings" is "one of the most frustrating things" about Home and Away.

Roz Laws from the publication opined that the duo's wedding was "turning into a real soap farce" because of the obstacles they have to overcome. A reporter from the Daily Record said "if Leah and Dan pop up in an episode of this silly soap, it's usually to offer a few patronising words of wisdom to a wrongdoer or two." Another writer stated that Dan did not have an "easy time" due to his arguments with Leah, adding that he made the situation worse by falling "back into Amanda's clutches".
