= Cassie Turner =

Fictional character from Home and Away

- Home and Away character
- Portrayed by: Sharni Vinson
- Duration: 2005–2008
- First appearance: 18 March 2005
- Last appearance: 2 April 2008
- Introduced by: Julie McGauran
In-universe information
- Occupation: Student at Summer Bay High School (2005–2007); Waitress
- Daughters: Summer Rose Turner
- Grandmothers: Joy Turner
- Uncles: Ben Foxton
- Aunts: Pauline Bennett
- First cousins: Carla Bennett; Liam Bennett

Cassandra "Cassie" Turner is a fictional character from the Australian Channel Seven soap opera Home and Away, played by Sharni Vinson. She debuted on-screen during an episode that aired on 18 March 2005. Vinson originally auditioned for the role of Martha MacKenzie (Jodi Gordon), but later secured the role of Cassie. She admitted it was a challenge to portray a character six years her junior who was still attending school. Cassie's backstory reveals that she was abused as a child by her uncle. However, her characterisation is out of conjunction with the usual victims of such crimes. She is portrayed as "fiercely independent and headstrong" female who has a knack for "winning friends and influencing people". Cassie is popular with the serial's male characters, while her allure also broadened off-screen to male viewers. Cassie is given a foster family when Sally Fletcher (Kate Ritchie) and Flynn Saunders (Joel McIlroy) take her into their home.

Cassie has featured in various romance storylines; in one she begins a relationship with Macca MacKenzie (Trent Baines). The serial decided to portray as domestic abuse through the two characters. Cassie was seen pushing those closest to her away, while Macca continued his abuse. Cassie was later involved in a storyline where she contracts HIV, and Vinson visited women with the virus as part of the research process. The storyline was well received by carriers of the virus and Vinson said it was a "big moment" in her acting career. Vinson has received one Logie Award nomination for her portrayal of Cassie. In 2007, Vinson decided to leave Home and Away because of personal commitments. Cassie departed on 2 April 2008, when she left to go travelling.

== Creation and casting ==
Sharni Vinson appeared in Home and Away in 2001 and 2003, as guest characters named Tonya and Summer respectively. In 2004, Vinson's agent submitted her to audition for the role of Martha MacKenzie. Vinson received a re-call for the role and was also handed scripts for another character, Cassie Turner. However, fellow actress Jodi Gordon went on to secure the role of Martha. Vinson said she wanted to play Martha because she was characterised as a tomboy, a trait which Vinson attributes to herself. Soon after, Vinson signed up to play Cassie. Vinson was twenty one at the time, while Cassie was portrayed as a fifteen-year-old student. Vinson later described the experience as "such a stretch" because she "well out of school and then I was back into a school uniform, with the pigtails, no makeup, playing this real young character." In her first few months on-screen, producers decided to cast Todd Lasance as Aden Jefferies. Aden was introduced as a new boyfriend for Cassie and was planned to heavily feature in her early storylines.

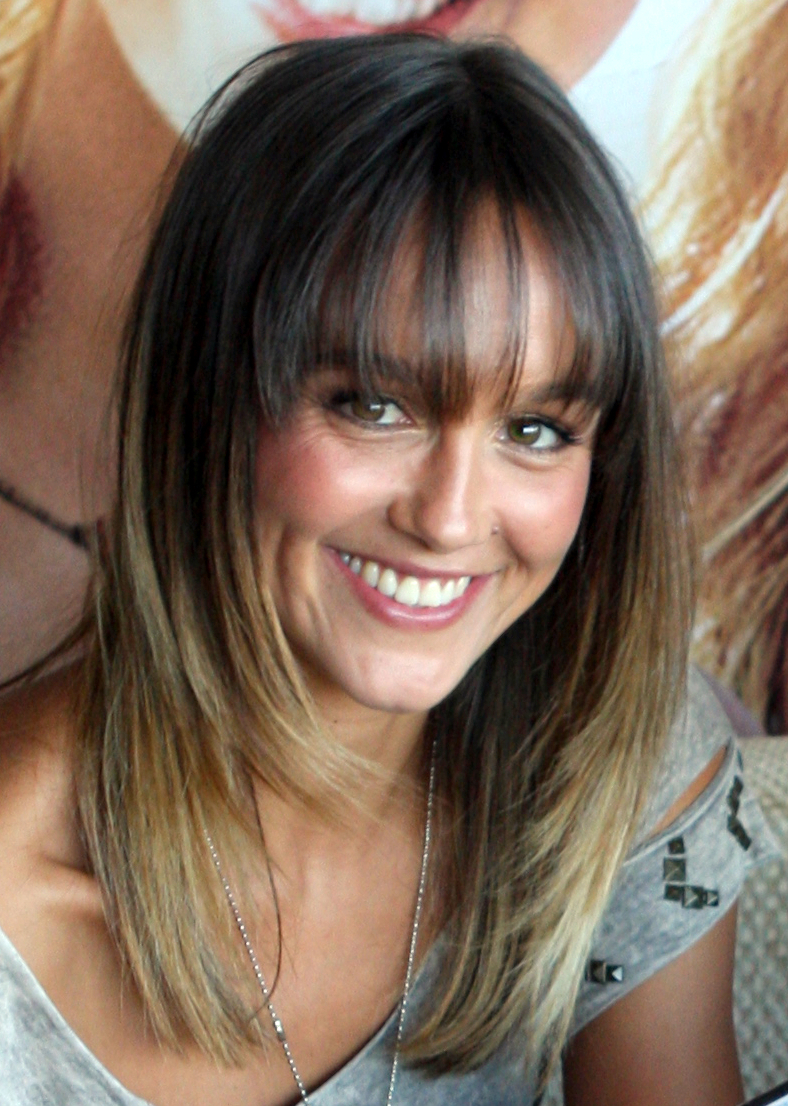
Sharni Vinson (pictured) plays the "fiercely independent and headstrong" Cassie.

In 2006, rival channel Network Ten tried to tempt Vinson into joining pop group Girlband, however she decided to stay in Home and Away. In July 2007, media outlets reported that Vinson wanted to quit the serial in order to pursue other projects in Los Angeles. In November that year it was confirmed that Vinson had quit Home and Away so she could move to Los Angeles to be with her boyfriend. However, the serial refused to comment on her departure because Cassie would still be seen on-screen into 2008. Vinson said she was happy that she got to play Cassie, because she enjoyed the work and portraying her storylines. By the time Vinson left, Cassie had appeared in a total of one hundred and three episodes.

== Development ==
=== Characterisation ===
Her monster of an uncle sexually abused her and it took years upon years for her to come to terms with it all. Thankfully, this meek little mouse was chased away ages ago. By a sex kitten. Do not be fooled by her heavenly smile: Cassie is anything but angelic. She may have more energy than a legion of Duracell bunnies and be a natural when it comes to making friends and influencing people, but Cassie has a wild and wanton streak. Sure, it can be lots of fun, but it can also create a whole lot of trouble. Cassie used to be fiercely independent and headstrong, really knowing how to hold her own when it came to the boys of the Bay.

— Five on Cassie.

Cassie has been described as having a “fiercely independent and headstrong” personality. Although she is capable of learning from her mistakes and demonstrates a talent for “winning friends and influencing people,” her strong will is largely attributed to her upbringing.

Following a difficult childhood, she was forced to live with her grandmother, Joy (Elaine Lee), after being abandoned by her mother. As her only close family member, Joy’s death left Cassie “devastated.” Cassie was also a victim of child abuse, which initially left her “deeply troubled.” However, with the help of counseling, she was eventually able to “learn how to live without anxiety.” Vinson told Yahoo!7 that Cassie is "mature" for a fifteen-year-old. As she has had to go through so much in her life, she "is older in the head than she realises". She also said that at the same time she can act "naive because she is young". In 2005, the characters of Cassie, Martha and Matilda Hunter (Indiana Evans) were used by the Seven Network to promote their clothing range. The characters were seen on-screen dressed in items from their clothing line.

=== Domestic violence ===
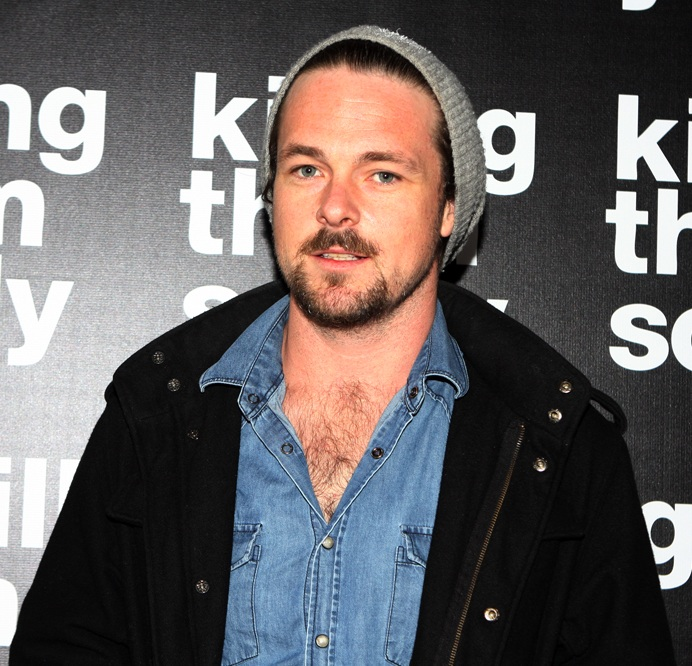
Trent Baines (pictured) plays Cassie's violent love interest, Macca.

In one storyline Cassie begins a relationship with Macca MacKenzie (Trent Baines), which turns violent when Macca starts to hit her. Cassie initially leaves Macca, but decides she loves him and dates him in secret. Those closest to Cassie are ashamed of her when they discover the truth. Female First opined that Cassie "cried her heart out" and "wished the whole world would just swallow her up" because of her dilemma. The publication also felt that there was nothing Ric Dalby (Mark Furze) could do to help Cassie, because she herself would not admit the truth.

After being assaulted by Macca, he convinces her to leave her family and friends behind and move away with him. The Daily Record said that Macca had "hardly been the ideal boyfriend" and said it wasn't hard to see why Cassie had doubts about leaving with him. Sally Fletcher (Kate Ritchie) tries to help Cassie, but she proves "stubborn" and decides to leave with Macca. He uncharacteristically warns Sally that she is in danger of losing her foster daughter for good. They said it was the first point in the storyline that Macca did a "mature, sensible thing". Five said that Macca would "trash her as soon as he looked at her". They opined that they were sure she would realise the truth about him in the end. They also hoped that other residents would listen to her. As the storyline came to a conclusion, Cassie finally became brave enough to leave Macca. However, he tracked her down and hit her again.

=== HIV ===
Cassie was later involved in a notable storyline in which she contracts HIV from Henk Van Patten (Damian De Montemas). Home and Away producers first informed Vinson about the HIV storyline in mid-2007. They also asked for her opinion on the development. Vinson was initially worried about the serial's early timeslot on the Seven Network, coupled with the "intense" nature of the storyline. However, she changed her mind upon receiving the scripts because she thought they were well written. When the storyline was screened, Vinson explained that Cassie is "in love, engaged and expecting a baby" so she thinks her life "couldn't be more fantastic". When Cassie discovers she is HIV positive, she feels as though she has hit "the bottom of the barrel" and knows that "her life's changed forever". Vinson added that after, Cassie finds the situation "incomprehensible" and cannot "understand" what has been told. She goes "numb" and is "overcome with shock". Cassie cannot cope with her "nightmare" and rushes out into the street, "straight into the path of an oncoming car". Cassie is then rushed to hospital following being run over and viewers were kept guessing as to whether her baby would survive.

The storyline was the first that Vinson "actually bothered" to go out and research. Vinson and her drama coach visited hospitals to meet with HIV positive females. Vinson received letters from HIV positive people, praising her portrayal of the issue. The moment that Cassie discovers she has the virus was well received by viewers. Vinson said that the feedback had made her "happy" and that playing the scenario was a "big moment" for herself as an actor. In early 2008, Cassie's exit storyline reported in the media over two months before she was due to depart. It was revealed that Cassie would leave to travel the world with Sally, before the birth of her daughter.

== Storylines ==
Cassie meets Ric while jet-skiing, it soon becomes clear she stole the vehicle and they escape the owner. She meets Ric once again and they go skinny dipping at the beach. Cassie steals his clothes and forces him to go home naked. Cassie attends the "Miss Groper" pageant where her grandmother, Joy is taking part. When she does not win, she gets into an argument with Colleen Smart (Lyn Collingwood), collapses and later dies. Cassie's uncle turns up, but she has flashbacks from her childhood where it is revealed he used to abuse her. He is reported to the police and Sally and Flynn decided to take Cassie into their home. Cassie becomes close to Ric, who is also fostered by Sally and Flynn. Their sexual tension becomes too much, but when it came to sleeping together, Cassie has flashbacks of her uncle Ben (Craig Elliot) abuse and subsequently breaks up with Ric. Cassie starts dating Aden and Ric becomes jealous of their relationship. Ric tackles Aden during a football match, so Aden's brother, Sean (Gabriel Egan) attacks Ric, causing Cassie to dump Aden and later gets back with Ric. Cassie is distraught when she discovers that Flynn is dying from cancer. She cannot cope with him wanting to end his life and goes on a rampage during a cyclone. She becomes trapped with Ric when an electricity cable falls on them. Sally and Flynn rescue them, but are electrocuted in doing so. Although they survive, Flynn later dies from his tumor and Cassie finds it hard to cope with his death.

When Belle Taylor (Jessica Tovey) arrives in Summer Bay, she feels threatened by her friendship with Ric and dumps him. She then meets Martha's adoptive brother, Macca and starts to date him. Their romance faces problems when she complains about not being able to see him often and the effect his prescription medication has on him. After more arguments Macca hits Cassie and she decides to forgive him, but reconciles with Ric after he dumps Belle. However, Belle still wants Ric so she convinces Cassie to tutor Drew Curtis (Bobby Morley), while she unsuccessfully attempted to steal Ric back. Ric attends a mechanical course in the city, while Macca returns claiming to have overcome his anger issues. Cassie realises she still has feelings for Macca and gets back together with him. When Ric finds out she has cheated, Cassie decides to move out of her home despite Sally telling her that she does not want her to go and stay with Irene Roberts (Lynne McGranger). Macca later receives a job offer in the city and asks Cassie to move with him. After an argument with Sally, Cassie decides to take up his offer. Macca feels bad and tells Sally that she should fight for Cassie; however she does not listen to Sally's pleas and moves. Cassie visits Summer Bay as much as she can; however her visits annoy Macca who begins to beat her up again. After a few more assaults, Cassie feels she has to move back home, but agrees to continue their relationship. Macca tracks her down and hits her again, before handing himself into the police.

Cassie decides to start at a charity helpline for domestic abuse victims. Brad Armstrong (Chris Sadrinna) helps her set the charity up and Dan Baker (Tim Campbell) acts as a counsellor. Cassie's first caller for help, Lily Nelson (Kathryn Beck) intrigues Cassie, who then meets up with her. Cassie wins Lily's trust and discovers she is being domestically abused by her boyfriend Kyle Sanders (Anthony Gee). Cassie uses her own experiences with Macca to convince Lily to leave Kyle. Cassie moves Lily into Summer Bay House, but when Sally finds out the truth she forces Lily to leave. Cassie goes to visit Lily, but Kyle turns violent, prompting Sally and Brad to save them. Lily moves back in with Cassie, but she becomes obsessed with protecting her. When Jules Munro (Joel Phillips) arrives, she warns Lily off him believing that he is bad. When Lily nearly drowns in the sea, Jules does not help her. This makes Cassie believe she is correct about him, however they soon realise they are attracted to one another. Jules lures Cassie into a driving lesson, but sabotages the car so he can spend time with her. Jules keeps trying to impress Cassie and even undresses for her. However, she seems more interested in Alex Poulos (Danny Raco). Jules becomes jealous and steals Alex's bike, which forces him to leave town and before he leaves he tells Cassie that he loves her. Cassie becomes close with Alex but is shocked when she discovers that he is dealing drugs. Jules later turns up again and they become close again. Jazz Curtis (Rachel Gordon) ruins their relationship when she lies to Cassie, claiming that she has been sleeping with Jules.

Cassie starts dating Henk which annoys Rachel Armstrong (Amy Mathews), who reveals that Henk raped her when she was younger. However, Cassie refuses to believe it and begins a serious relationship with him. Henk later comes bored and dumps Cassie. She later attends a party with Matilda Hunter (Indiana Evans) and where Aden is smoking marijuana. Cassie drives them home despite drinking; when Aden distracts her she crashes the car and is arrested for drunk driving. Henk returns to support Cassie, who is let off with her offence. Cassie discovers that she is pregnant and she and Henk decide to get married. Cassie takes a blood test and discovers that she has contracted HIV from Henk. She runs out of the surgery and is run over by an oncoming car. Although she recovers, Henk leaves her once again and Rachel supports her through her troubles. When Henk returns to win Cassie back, she refuses and tells him she needs to be alone. Aden has to take a HIV test after he got Cassie's blood on her in the crash, but the test returns negative but refuses to forgive Cassie. She is heartbroken when Alf Stewart (Ray Meagher) tells Cassie he wants nothing to do with her because she has HIV. Colleen also voices her prejudice by implying she may infect Sally's baby. They both later apologise when Cassie raises awareness of the virus and gains everyone's support. Sally suggests that Cassie goes travelling with her, which she accepts. Cassie decides to have one last road trip with her best friend, Matilda and travel by car. Cassie feels her baby kick for the first time and waves goodbye to the town's residents as she leaves for her new life.

== Reception ==
For her portrayal of Cassie, Vinson was nominated in the category of "Most Popular New Female Talent" at the 2006 Logie Awards. Soap opera magazine Inside Soap said that whenever fictional characters are happy, "disaster lurks around the corner". They opined that it was "no surprise" that Cassie's world "came crashing down" when she discovers she is HIV positive. The Birmingham Mail chose the moment that Cassie realised Jules fancied her as their "pick of the day". A columnist for the Sunday Mirror said that Cassie "set pulses racing" and branded her a "sexy soap siren". They also opined that Vinson herself was a "sexy Home & Away starlet" and that her departure was "bad news" and "disappointing" for men who watch the serial. While the Daily Record opined that Cassie's actions over Lily were always set to lead her into trouble. While they acknowledged that she is a "well-meaning teen", they felt that by going to such lengths to save one caller in-turn endangered "the future" of the helpline charity.
