= Kim Hyde =

Soap opera character

- Home and Away character
- Portrayed by: Chris Hemsworth
- Duration: 2004–2007
- First appearance: 17 February 2004
- Last appearance: 3 July 2007
- Introduced by: Julie McGauran
- Book appearances: Home and Away: Mayday
In-universe information
- Occupation: Student; Lifeguard; Personal trainer
- Father: Barry Hyde
- Mother: Kerry Hyde
- Brothers: Jonathan Hyde
- Wife: Rachel Armstrong (2006–07); Kit Hunter (2007–)
- Sons: Archie Hunter Hyde
- Grandfathers: Jim Hyde
- Aunts: Lorraine Robertson

Kimberly "Kim" Hyde is a character on the Australian television soap opera Home and Away, played by Chris Hemsworth. He made his first appearance on 17 February 2004 and departed on 3 July 2007.

== Casting ==
Hemsworth originally auditioned for the role of Robbie Hunter, but he was turned down by the producers and the role went to Jason Smith. Hemsworth was then asked to return and try out for the role of Kim Hyde. He won the role and had to relocate to Sydney to film his scenes. Of joining Home and Away, Hemsworth said "The role in Home and Away is consistent work for me and is a great experience. It is so fast-paced and basically it allows me to learn a lot about the industry." Hemsworth appeared for three and a half years on Home and Away, before leaving in 2007 to focus on his film career. Hemsworth returned to the set of Home and Away in November 2014 to film a scene in the Pier Diner, as an extra and not as his character Kim Hyde, in which he was seen at a table in the background, wearing a black baseball cap. He appeared in the episode broadcast on 19 May 2015.

== Storylines ==
Kim arrives in Summer Bay after his father, Barry (Ivar Kants) is appointed principal of Summer Bay High at the start of the school year. It is clear the two do not get along and already had previous issues when Barry taught at Kim's previous school. He quickly befriends Robbie and embarrasses him in front of his girlfriend Tasha Andrews (Isabel Lucas) when he questions Robbie's virginity. The moment is interrupted when the three witness Noah Lawson (Beau Brady) wipe out while surfing. Kim dives into the sea and saves Noah. Robbie and Tasha are impressed with his heroics and suggest he join a swimming team, which Kim declines having previously been on one. Kim and Barry's relationship becomes more and more strained to the point where Kim moves in with Tasha and Irene Roberts. His ex, Brooke McPherson (Alyssa McClelland) returns, telling him he is the father of her son Charlie. Kim is furious when realises Barry knew about the child but grows to love Charlie. The truth is revealed that Charlie is not his son and Brooke leaves, with Kim and Barry's relationship no better than before. He then drops out of school and begins working at the gym after Tasha buys him a share much to his father's chagrin. He re-enrolls after Noah's death and participates in a memorial concert.

Matilda Hunter (Indiana Evans) takes an interest in Kim and feigns drowning to get his attention only for it to backfire and end up struggling for real. However, she is rescued. Matilda overhears Kim talking to Robbie and saying he will ask out his sister. However, Kim means Robbie and Matilda's older sister, Kit (Amy Mizzi). Kim and Kit begin a relationship before she heads to Paris. Kim gets his driver's license and takes a camping trip with Robbie and Tasha. Robbie steps on a needle and fears he has contracted HIV. Kim supports him, but their friendship becomes somewhat strained when Robbie's behaviour becomes erratic. During this time, Kim becomes close to Noah's widow, Hayley (Bec Cartwright; Ella Scott Lynch) and they have a brief fling which ends.

Kim dates Eve Jacobsen (Emily Perry), who is using the identity of Zoe McCallister. When Kim returns from the city after a break, he is alarmed to learn that Eve has apparently died and was the Summer Bay Stalker. His next big shock is Hayley is pregnant and he is possibly the father, Scott Hunter (Kip Gamblin) who is dating Hayley is also a possibility. Scott and Hayley break up, and Kim gets together with Hayley and he proposes, but some people suspect Hayley is only with Kim because of the baby. On the day of the wedding, Hayley discovers she still loves Scott and jilts Kim at the altar. Scott proposes to Hayley and they plan to leave Summer Bay with baby Noah, which infuriates Kim and he seeks legal advice. After a meeting, Kim is run over by a car and it is revealed he does not share the baby's blood type, meaning he is not the father despite paternity results saying so (they were secretly swapped by Eve). Scott and Hayley leave for Paris and Kim becomes depressed.

He then befriends Kylie Kopperton (Leah Etkind) who introduces him to ecstasy. Kim overdoses one night and is thrown out of a car outside the hospital during the storm. Rachel Armstrong (Amy Mathews) finds him and he is revived. She becomes his counsellor in order to help him handle his recent grief. They become closer and Kim steps up his quest to woo her and they become a couple. Brian Helpman (John Noble), Rachel's superior begins blackmailing her about the relationship and Rachel is forced to come clean and is luckily able to continue as a doctor. Kim is shocked when Barry is unmasked as the murderer of local mayor Josh West (Daniel Collopy) who blackmailed him about the death of Kim's mother, Kerry and stands by his father. During this time, Charlie McKinnon (Matt Levett) befriends Kim and Rachel and becomes dangerously obsessed with Kim. Charlie kidnaps Rachel but he is foiled and instituationalised. When Eve reappears much to the shock of everyone at Jack Holden (Paul O'Brien) and Martha MacKenzie's (Jodi Gordon) wedding and causes an explosion which kills her, Tracey Thompson (Sarah Enright) and Rachel's mother, Elaine (Julie Hudspeth), Kim is among the casualties. He, Robbie, Matilda, Martha, Kit and Belle Taylor (Jessica Tovey) are airlifted to the city but their helicopter crashes in the bush, leaving them stranded. While the others go for help, Kim stays behind with Kit and fearing they will die, the pair have sex. The party is found and Kim and Kit's liaison is revealed to Rachel, who forgives Kim.

Following an unfounded accusation from Tara O'Neill (Cashelle Dunn) of sexual assault and his wedding to Rachel, the drama in Kim's life escalates when Kit returns for the Christmas, announcing she is pregnant with their child. Rachel has some difficulty accepting after plans to adopt Lee Morton's (Natasha Lee) newborn son Joe, fall through. Kim and Kit grow closer together and Kim and Rachel's marriage begins to feel strained. Kim and Kit share a kiss, and following the revelation that Rachel slept with Hugh Sullivan (Rodger Corser), Kim decides to leave her and be with Kit and baby Archie in the city.

== Reception ==
For his portrayal of Kim, Hemsworth won the Most Popular New Male Talent award at the 2005 Logie Awards, he also received a nomination for Most Popular Actor. The following year, Hemsworth was again nominated for Most Popular Actor. At the first Digital Spy Soap Awards, Hemsworth earned a nomination for Best Exit. Hannah Rand of The Daily Telegraph said Hemsworth was "born to play hunky high school dropout" Kim, due to his physique and pin-up looks.
