= Tony Holden (Home and Away) =

- Home and Away character
- Portrayed by: Jon Sivewright
- Duration: 2005–2010
- First appearance: 5 August 2005
- Last appearance: 11 August 2010
- Introduced by: Julie McGuaran
In-universe information
- Occupation: PE Teacher; Surf instructor Personal Trainer
- Sisters: Gina Austin
- Wife: Kate Holden (1980–1989); Rachel Armstrong (2009–)
- Civil partner: Beth Hunter (2005–2007)
- Sons: Jack Holden; Lucas Holden; Harry Holden
- Nephews: Hugo Austin; Brendan Austin; Xavier Austin

Anthony "Tony" Holden is a fictional character from the Australian Channel Seven soap opera Home and Away, played by Jon Sivewright. The character debuted on-screen during the episode airing on 5 August 2005. As of 2010 Sivewright was the joint second longest-serving current male cast member in the serial. In February 2010, it was announced that Sivewright was being written out of the serial after five years following the departure of his co-star Amy Mathews. Tony's storylines have focused on his grief on losing his wife, girlfriend and child, he is described as a "family man" who puts them first.

== Casting ==
As of 2010 Sivewright was the joint-second longest serving male cast member. That year his co-star Mathews who plays on-screen wife Rachel Armstrong had quit the serial to pursue other projects and it was revealed that producers decided that it was the right time to write out Sivewright's character. Commenting on their exits a spokesperson for the serial stated: "Amy Mathews is definitely going in a few months' time. Then, with Amy's character Rachel out of the picture, it was decided Tony should go with her, so Jon Sivewright is leaving too." Fellow cast member Rebecca Breeds who plays Ruby Buckton in the serial spoke out about their departures stating: "In terms of character, to see Tony and Rachel go is kind of upsetting because they fill a really important demographic - that middle-aged, new family thing and there's nothing like that on the show now so they're a loss."

== Characterisation ==
The serial's official website describe Tony as suffering "great loss" throughout his life. They describe his persona stating: ", Tony has great compassion and empathy for others, yet always looks at the big picture with a positive perspective on things." Tony likes to keep fit, but does not mind a beer with the boys. He's also described as a family man, of this Sivewright states: "Tony's family is everything to him, he has a lot of love for his kids, but he has seen a lot of grief in his life and has quite a self- destructive side that can emerge– which makes him a challenging character to portray."

In 2008 Tony embarked on an unexpected relationship with Rachel, Tony is older and not the type of man she would normally date, of this Mathews states: "It's a surprise love interest, someone who is not Rachel's type which is great because I think we should all try expanding our narrow type registers, thankfully, Jon and I know each other quite well, so it's no big deal."

== Storylines ==
Tony arrives in Summer Bay with his two sons, Jack (Paul O'Brien) and Lucas (Rhys Wakefield). Tony, a widower after the death of his wife Kate, strikes up a romance with single parent and widow Beth Hunter (Clarissa House), who lives next door to him. Tony and Lucas move in with Beth and her family whilst Jack remains in his dad's house. Beth decides to go and tour the world. Tony, thinking Beth is unhappy, proposes to Beth but she rejects telling him that she does not need to marry Tony in order to be with him. She promises to return to her partner and family. However, as she is returning, she is involved in a tragic accident and dies. Tony struggles to cope with the loss of his partner and even sleeps with new school teacher Naomi Preston (Tiffany Preece), unbeknownst to him, she has a relationship with his son Lucas. Lucas is livid when he finds out the truth, but eventually forgives him.

Tony embarks on a disastrous relationship with Jazz Curtis (Rachel Gordon) before finding happiness with Rachel Armstrong. Tony is initially unsure on whether to ask Rachel out on a date due to the age difference, and Rachel herself is not sure of accepting it as she was flirting with new resident Roman Harris. However, Colleen likens Roman Harris (Conrad Coleby) to Rachel's ex-husband Kim Hyde (Chris Hemsworth) who left her for Kit Hunter (Amy Mizzi), and it is this comment that leads Rachel to accept Tony's date.

Rachel still wants children and is upset when Tony announces he has had a vasectomy. He agrees to reverse the vasectomy for her and try for a baby, although the doctors tell Tony the chances of conceiving a child are low. Tony proposes to Rachel who happily accepts, when the wedding day arrives, Rachel goes missing. She is kidnapped by Aden Jefferies (Todd Lasance) who was holds her and his father Larry hostage. Tony, Jack and Leah all presume that Rachel had got cold feet and had run away. Tony, devastated by this, goes on a holiday to drown his sorrows. Rachel returns from her tragic ordeal, and Tony arrives back. There is tension between the pair, Tony and Rachel soon picked up where they left off. However, Bridget Simmons (Joy Smithers) arrives in the Bay, a woman who Tony had had a one-night stand with whilst on holiday. He tells Rachel, who forgives him. Tony and Rachel then get married and Rachel later announces she is finally pregnant.

Tony finds Jack dead at a building site. This had a bad effect on Tony who becomes less talkative and stays away from work. Everyone begins to notice Tony is extremely stricken with grief and is unable to cope. He attacks Jack's killer Angelo Rosetta (Luke Jacobz) at his son's funeral, when he finds out the truth about Jack's death. Tony gradually returns to normal when Angelo is arrested and left the bay. Tony then starts acting oddly again and begins staying out late, this leads Rachel to suspect he is having an affair. Angelo returns after being found not guilty of murder, claiming he did it in self-defence. Tony seemingly warms to Angelo, but it soon becomes clear he is planning revenge. When on a fishing trip with Angelo, he attempts to kill him by pushing him off a cliff. However, he comes to his senses and saved him. A couple of weeks later Rachel gives birth to a son, Harry. Rachel soon becomes irate over her parenting, she believes she is a bad mother. Tony tries to help Rachel but she pushes him away, it soon becomes clear she is suffering from Post natal depression. After Rachel returns to work, they sort out their differences. John Palmer (Shane Withington) causes friction between many residents, Tony takes a dislike to this. They begin a drawn out feud and Tony takes his interest in boxing to a new level. He decides to take on John, which annoys Rachel. She becomes more annoyed because Tony starts a women's boxing class. Tony and John face each other in the ring but the fight is declared a draw when neither man lands a punch on the other and the crowd walk away.

Rachel is later offered a job in Boston. Tony refuses to go, saying Summer Bay is his home. Tony is later more furious when Rachel buys a ticket without telling him. Later Rachel figures out that the reason he does not want to go is because Jack is buried in Summer Bay. Rachel tell Tony she will stay for him. After that Tony says that he will go with her to America. Their last scene is shown with Tony, Rachel and Harry at Jack's grave to say goodbye and they leave.

== Reception ==
Soap opera reporting website Holy Soap recall Tony's most memorable scenes as being when he reversed his vasectomy so Rachel and he could have kids. Upon Tony and Rachel's departure, the website stated they were fans of their romantic relationship adding: "If anyone deserves true love, then it's these two! There were sighs of relief all round when they finally tied the knot (their first attempt having been ruined by another pesky kidnapping) and they later welcomed beautiful baby son Harry."
