= Amanda Vale =

- Home and Away character
- Portrayed by: Holly Brisley
- Duration: 2005–2009
- First appearance: 30 June 2005
- Last appearance: 11 August 2009
- Introduced by: Julie McGauran (2005); Cameron Welsh (2008–2009)
In-universe information
- Occupation: Actress; Drama teacher Topless model Head of project 56; Movie producer Gym owner
- Mother: Kitty Landsdowne
- Sisters: Kelli Vale
- Husband: Dan Baker (1998–2005); Graham Walters (2005–2006); Peter Baker (2007–)
- Sons: Ryan Baker
- Daughters: Belle Taylor
- Stepsons: Drew Curtis
- Stepdaughters: Beth Hunter

Amanda Baker (also Vale and Walters) is a fictional character from the Australian soap opera Home and Away, played by Holly Brisley. She made her first screen appearance during the episode broadcast on 30 June 2005 and departed in 2007. Brisley later reprised the role for brief guest appearances in 2008 and 2009.

== Casting ==
Brisley reprised her role of Amanda in October 2007. She said "My character only moved to the city so she can flit in and flit out". In June 2009, it was announced that Brisley would be returning to Home and Away to take part in a secretive storyline. Brisley's real-life pregnancy was written in to the scripts. On her return Brisley said "People still recognise me as Amanda or send me mail, but their response is always positive – even when she was at her worst I think people responded well to her as she spiced things up a bit and she wasn't afraid to stand up for herself.

== Characterisation ==
Amanda is described as the "ultimate attention-seeker", who manipulates people to get what she wants. Amanda has the ability to use a person's weaknesses to exploit them. She has a desire for attention, which led her to become an actress.

== Storylines ==
Amanda arrives in Summer Bay ahead of her ex-husband, Dan Baker (Tim Campbell) wedding to Leah Patterson (Ada Nicodemou) bringing their son, Ryan (Issac Gorman) and is seemingly pleasant to Leah. However, it emerges that Amanda has been secretly trying to sabotage the wedding by cancelling the caterers. Dan's brother, Peter (Nicholas Bishop) exposes Amanda's antics at the reception and Dan and Leah order her to leave. The next month, Amanda takes a job at Summer Bay High as a drama teacher to pay off mounting debts owed to Leo Simms (Johann Wahlvaran). She tries to pay Leo off with the money she has but it is not enough and he attacks her and tries to flee. After a tussle, Leo is killed after hitting his head and Amanda panics, dumps the body and plants her jewellery on him. After an investigation, the case is closed.

Amanda begins a relationship with Scott Hunter (Kip Gamblin) and causes his family many problems. When Scott's sister Kit (Amy Mizzi) tries to expose Amanda cheating on him, She destroys the evidence and later spikes Kit's drink, which results in Kit being sent away to rehab as she had previously suffered from alcoholism. Amanda discovers that Scott is the father of Hayley Lawson's (Bec Hewitt) baby and when he decides he wants to be with her, She fakes a pregnancy. Josh West (Daniel Collopy) finds out and begins blackmailing Amanda into helping him with his campaign for Mayor, which he eventually wins. Amanda later learnt about Josh's true intentions for returning to Summer Bay. After being confirmed mayor, Josh decided to put a scheme called Project 56 into order. Amanda, not knowing the truth behind it, tried working with Morag Bellingham (Cornelia Frances), but Morag learnt that Amanda had shared a flat with Josh in LA and presumed that Amanda was working with Josh. Determined to prove herself to everyone, Amanda broke into Josh's office and stole information on the project. But as she tried sending it to Morag, Josh confronted her and managed to get the information back. Amanda tried confessing to Morag what had happened, but Morag refused to listen. After Amanda's lies are exposed, a group of students make fun of her. She lashes out at Scott's brother, Robbie (Jason Smith) and slaps him during class. Barry Hyde (Ivar Kants) suspends Amanda for this but she quits to work with Josh. Morag made it perfectly clear that she and Josh were going to lose everything if Project 56 was carried out, but Amanda denied everything and ignores Morag's advice.

Graham Walters (Doug Scroope), Scott's grandfather arrived in Summer Bay and informed his family he had come into some money from the sale of his farm. Amanda learns this and puts a plan in motion to use Graham, in order for her to pay off Josh. They marry very quickly to the shock of the Hunters. However, Amanda considered backing out of the project when Morag was nearly killed by Josh. As Josh comforted her, the two of them realised that they both had feelings for each other and started a relationship. Morag managed to convince Graham of what was going on. Graham broke into Josh's office and stole the documents to Project 56. But while confronting Amanda, he had a heart attack and ended up in hospital. Amanda was horrified when Graham woke up and eventually remembered everything, resulting in him having another heart attack. After Graham was announced brain dead, Amanda's loyalties were questioned when she stopped visiting Graham and Beth Hunter (Clarissa House), Graham's daughter, exposed Amanda's relationship with Josh. Amanda then tried backing out of the project again when Beth tried seeking legal action against Amanda. Even though Josh continued to manipulate her, Amanda was devastated when she learnt that Josh had been seeing two other women. Amanda considered teaming up with Beth and tried exposing Josh's schemes. But after being attacked several times by Josh's thugs, Amanda decided to end everything and attempted shooting Josh. When Josh is found dead in his office, Amanda is one of many suspects and Peter is about to charge her when CCTV footage placing Amanda somewhere else exonerates her completely. Amanda has a brief dalliance with Dan after he and Leah fall out but nothing further develops and she leaves again, taking Ryan with her.

Two months later, Amanda returns to Summer Bay, moving into a large mansion. Her mother, Kitty, arrives, claiming that she is unwell. Local teenager Belle Taylor (Jessica Tovey) is searching for her biological mother and finds herself at odds with Amanda. Belle is revealed to be Amanda's daughter. After learning that Kitty had Belle adopted out and led Amanda to think she had miscarried, Amanda orders her to leave. Amanda and Belle have a shaky start but when Belle is feared dead in a helicopter crash with several others, Amanda funds the search, even putting her house up as collateral. When the search appears to be futile, Amanda feels a pain in her leg and is convinced Belle is still alive and soon, Belle and the others are found. Amanda then makes an effort to get to know Belle. Irene Roberts (Lynne McGranger), Belle's guardian agrees for Amanda to see her at a set time but when Amanda is delayed, Belle is disappointed. Amanda begins buying Belle expensive gifts to try and smooth things over. After falling out with Irene, Belle then moves in with Amanda. When Peter's son, Drew Curtis (Bobby Morley) starts dating Belle, there is an attraction between him and Amanda. They begin an affair and Belle finds out and is heartbroken and returns to live with Irene. Drew tells Amanda he wants to be with her but she rejects him. Amanda then begins a relationship with Peter, much to the disgust of Drew.

Amanda's sister, Kelli (Alexa Ashton), reappears in Amanda's life and she reconnects with her, but unknown to Amanda, Kelli is working on a revenge scheme to pay Amanda back for a car crash when they were younger, which left Kelli injured. Kelli then works with her boyfriend Ethan Black to make Amanda's life a misery. Kelli stages it so Amanda looks like she slept with Ethan and obtains photographic evidence. Ethan blackmails Amanda and after she tries to flee, an incident similar to the situation with Leo occurs where Ethan falls from her car and appears to be dead. Amanda wants to confess but Kelli talks her out of it.

Amanda and Peter marry and everything seems to be going well until Ethan, believed dead by Amanda, arrives at the ceremony and tells everyone to look under their seats. The congregation find pictures of Amanda and Ethan in bed together. Amanda tries to explain but Peter runs off. Amanda becomes depressed and begins drinking heavily, which culminates in her crashing her car and is arrested for drink-driving as a result. Amanda soon learns the truth about Kelli and Ethan's scheme after overhearing a phone call. Kelli follows Amanda and Amanda's car overturns while she tries to get away, and the vehicle explodes and Kelli thinks Amanda been killed but Peter manages to rescue her. Kelli is arrested and shows no remorse for her actions, even telling Amanda at the hospital that she will never accept Amanda's forgiveness and would gladly try to kill her again if she had the time. Amanda is thus forced to disown Kelli as a sister for good, and Kelli is ultimately sent to jail, with Ethan later testifying against her. Amanda then reunites with her children and Peter forgives her but is unable to forget what happened. Amanda then decides to leave for the city and is later joined by Peter who tells her he wants to be with her and they reunite.

The following year, when Dan is killed in an abseiling accident in America and his body is flown back to the bay, Amanda and Ryan return for the funeral. Amanda supports Leah, but gets into a fight with Jazz Curtis (Rachel Gordon). Amanda returns in 2009 for Belle's wedding to Aden Jefferies (Todd Lasance) and she reveals she is pregnant. Amanda returns a few months later, with Ryan, to see Belle as she is dying of cancer. Amanda is angered by Aden allowing Belle to stay at home, respecting her wishes. Amanda calls an ambulance and admits Belle to hospital. She contacts a specialist from the city and attempts to prove that Belle is not of sound mind to make decisions of her welfare but Rachel Armstrong (Amy Mathews) over-rules her and Belle is discharged from hospital. Amanda later apologises to Belle for interfering and tells her she was just trying to help and states that she is a terrible mother. Belle reassures her, telling her that she will be a brilliant mother to her new baby. Belle also touches her mother's pregnancy bump and promises to watch over her half-sibling. Belle dies that night and Amanda returns to the city, with Ryan, devastated by her daughter's death.

== Reception ==
For her portrayal of Amanda, Brisley was nominated for in the "Best Bitch" category at the 2006 and 2007 Inside Soap Awards respectively. A Virgin Media writer stated, "Home and Away's serial temptress Amanda was a known attention-seeker and master manipulator. She was always quick to find people's weaknesses and use them to her advantage. Go girl!" Taragh Loughrey-Grant of RTÉ.ie branded the character "scheming and manipulative".
