= Rachel Armstrong =

- Home and Away character
- Portrayed by: Amy Mathews
- Duration: 2006–2010
- First appearance: Episode 4101; 16 January 2006
- Last appearance: Episode 5138; 11 August 2010
- Introduced by: Julie McGauran
In-universe information
- Other names: Rachel Hyde (first married name); Rachel Holden (second married name)
- Occupation: Doctor; Psychiatrist
- Father: Robert Armstrong
- Mother: Elaine Armstrong
- Brothers: Brad Armstrong
- Half-sisters: Tamsyn Armstrong
- Husband: Kim Hyde (2006–2007); Tony Holden (2009–)
- Sons: Harry Holden
- Stepsons: Jack Holden; Lucas Holden

Rachel Marie Holden (also Armstrong and Hyde) is a fictional character from the Australian Channel Seven soap opera Home and Away, played by Amy Mathews. Rachel debuted on-screen during the episode airing on 16 January 2006. In 2010 Mathews quit the serial to pursue other projects and her on-screen husband Tony Holden was also written out. Rachel has been described as "work driven and professional" and a "sharp mind". Her storylines include a failed marriage to Kim Hyde, her marriage to Tony and suffering post-natal depression. Rachel went on a downward spiral following the death of her mother and a helicopter crash which she blamed herself for. Rachel committed crimes such as assault, drink driving and taking pills and alcohol. Rachel has also been kidnapped a total of four times throughout her duration.

== Casting ==
Mathews joined Home and Away in 2006, Rachel was introduced as an old friend of Leah Patterson-Baker (Ada Nicodemou).

In 2010 Mathews quit the serial to pursue other projects and it was revealed that producers had decided to write out Jon Sivewright who plays on-screen husband Tony Holden. Commenting on their exits a spokesperson for the serial stated: "Amy Mathews is definitely going in a few months' time. Then, with Amy's character Rachel out of the picture, it was decided Tony should go with her, so Jon Sivewright is leaving too." Fellow cast member Rebecca Breeds who plays Ruby Buckton in the serial spoke out about their departures stating: "In terms of character, to see Tony and Rachel go is kind of upsetting because they fill a really important demographic – that middle-aged, new family thing and there's nothing like that on the show now so they're a loss."

== Character development ==
=== Characterisation ===
The serial's official website describe Rachel stating: "She has great instincts for people and has a sharp mind; she’s fiercely independent and has great strength of character." Of Rachel's persona, Mathews states: "Rachel is outgoing and fun with a sharp mind and good instincts for people. She has incredible strength and is fiercely independent. She has strong values and definite ideas about right and wrong but she is also a romantic at heart." Mathews has stated the likeness of herself and Rachel stating: "I wish I was more like my character- she's so together! As far as personality goes, she's really driven, and she's professional. [...] Rachel's a really bad cook, and I'm a good cook."

=== Storyline development ===
In her later years Rachel embarked on an unexpected relationship with Tony, of this Mathews states: "It's a surprise love interest, someone who is not Rachel's type which is great because I think we should all try expanding our narrow type registers, thankfully, Jon and I know each other quite well, so it's no big deal." Mathews also recalled Rachel's relationship with Kim Hyde (Chris Hemsworth) stating: "He was really great and we had a great time, it was terrific to have the longevity of the working relationship in a marriage with him. But I am looking forward to what happens with Tony or with someone else."

Rachel becomes central to a main storyline in which a stalker begins attacking females working at the hospital. Rachel later discovers that Reverend John Hall (Paul Tassone) is responsible when he takes her hostage. Mathews said that Revered Hall grudge against people who he thinks have acted immoral. In Rachel's case Reverend Hall believes Rachel is a sinner because she had a miscarriage and wasn't married to the baby's father Lewis Rigg (Luke Carroll). Reverend Hall also thinks that Rachel should sacrifice her own life "in exchange for the baby's". Reverend Hall begins to convulse and Rachel is given a "lifeline". Rachel goes as far to call for help and in hospital he is diagnosed with a brain tumour. Rachel realises his condition has contributed to his behaviour. Mathews said Rachel is the only one who can understand Reverend Hall's behaviour, because she is a doctor. She true to Rachel's nature she even "goes as far to forgive him", but she is alone as the other locals persecute him and the church.

A big storyline for Rachel was suffering post-natal depression following the birth of Harry. While Rachel is pregnant and does not take any maternity leave. One of her patients Jane Avent (Felicity Price) loses her baby while Rachel is on duty and subsequently files a lawsuit against Rachel. When Rachel gave birth to a son named Harry, Mathews told TV Week that Rachel would begin to behave differently. Rachel feels "completely overwhelmed" and it was something she could not prepare for. While Tony is okay as he previously had children. However Jane begins to harass Rachel, Mathews said that Jane does not think it is fair that Rachel gets to keep her baby. She also stated that everyone is unsure that Rachel should have remained in work while heavily pregnant. As the storyline progresses, Rachel becomes more "possessive and controlling" over Harry and "abuses" Tony for not keeping her informed about him. Rachel shows a "side" of herself that no one has ever seen before. The lawsuit makes Rachel's anxiety worse and Mathews opined that Rachel and Tony's relationship turned bad because "they couldn't be further apart" while she goes through post-natal depression. Mathews stated "For Rachel to be cranky and sad for so long was really hard. I felt bad for Rachel and for the viewers constantly seeing me wailing!"

== Storylines ==
Rachel is a doctor who is introduced as an old school friend of Leah. She has a brother, Brad (Chris Sadrinna), and half-sister, Tamsyn (Gabrielle Scollay). Before starting her first shift Rachel finds Kim Hyde unconscious and saves him. Rachel is assigned as Kim's psych registrar and she begins to feel attracted to him. She suggests he see someone else, but Kim decides to stay because he feels attracted to her. Rachel is sexually harassed by Doctor Brian Helpman (John Noble). Rachel turns to Kim for comfort and they begin a relationship. Helpman threatens to report Rachel for her affair with Kim if she doesn't sleep with him so she reports him and comes clean about her relationship. Rachel is struck off the psych registry, but is later given a new job in the Accident and Emergency department. Rachel is annoyed when her father, Robert (John Gregg) briefly works at the hospital. Kim's new friend Charlie McKinnon (Matt Levett) begins spending a plenty of time with them. Charlie soon becomes infatuated with Kim and starts dressing up like him and becoming possessive. Charlie later takes Rachel kidnaps Rachel. Rachel hits Charlie with a pipe causing him to seizure, she decides to save his life. She blames herself for not noticing his issues sooner. At Martha MacKenzie (Jodi Gordon) and Jack Holden's (Paul O'Brien) wedding reception Eve Jacobsen (Emily Perry) causes a massive explosion at the venue. Rachel's mother Elaine (Julie Hudspeth) dies in the explosion, leaving Rachel confused in her grief, however she carried on helping the injured. She arranged a helicopter to take the seriously injured including Kim to the city for further treatment. The helicopter crashes in a storm and everyone is presumed dead. Fearing death Kim sleeps with Kit Hunter (Amy Mizzi). Everyone blames Rachel for the crash and she believes it is her fault. She starts going on drinking binges and taking large amounts of tablets. She is arrested for drunk driving. Leah tries to help her, but an insulted Rachel slaps Leah in the face and tries to fight her. Brad tries to stop Rachel from her drinking. Rachel is later found passed out after an overdose of drugs and drink. Kim is saved and admits his affair, Rachel forgives him. Rachel wants children when she feels better but Kim doesn't which strains their relationship. Kim is accused of sexually assaulting Tara O'Neill (Cashelle Dunn), but it is revealed she had lied.

Kim and Rachel marry and try to adopt a baby called Joe Morton until his mother Lee (Natasha Lee) returns to take him off the pair. Kit reveals she is pregnant and when she has the baby Kim takes Kit's side on many things. Hugh Sullivan (Rodger Corser), Rachel's ex-boyfriend turns up, they sleep together. Hugh leaves Rachel alone after she refuses to leave Kim, she tells Kim the truth and he refuses to forgive her and tells her he is going to live with Kit because he loves her instead.

Brad's friend Henk Van Patten (Damian de Montemas) arrives in town and starts a relationship with Cassie Turner (Sharni Vinson), leaving Rachel furious and reveals he sexually assaulted her when she was younger. A stalker becomes active targeting the hospital. Rachel starts a relationship with Lewis and becomes pregnant. He wants nothing to do with her, Rachel miscarries and Lewis decides he wants the baby after all. Sam Holden (Jessica Chapnik) accuses Lewis of being the hospital stalker, Reverend Hall offers Rachel a lift home and she gladly accepts. He reveals he is the stalker and ties her up, gagging her. He tries to hurt her but collapses and has a fit, Rachel saves his life.

Rachel grows close to Roman Harris (Conrad Coleby) but after he reminds her of Kim she decides to date Tony Holden. Tony is told the likelihood he can help Rachel conceive for a child is low, however they later are delighted when she becomes pregnant. Rachel's patient Jimmy Crawford (Adam Booth) begins to stalk her and Aden Jefferies (Todd Lasance) kidnaps her and tries to kill his father, Larry. Belle Taylor (Jessica Tovey) and Rachel talk Aden out of this and she is set free. Tony thought she missed the wedding because she loved Hugh still, but they later reconcile. Baby Joe comes back into Rachel's life after his mother goes missing. She looks after him for a while, but he is sent away again leaving Rachel upset because she bonded with him again. Rachel later finds out he has died leaving her devastated. Following Jack's death Rachel and Tony's relationship becomes strained. Rachel starts to suspect that Tony is having an affair. They later repair their relationship after Tony realises his anger is out of control. The couple get married and Rachel later gives birth to a baby son, Harry. She tries to get him in a routine but is annoyed at everyone for visiting. She feels like a bad mother because Harry never stops crying. Rachel begins to suffer post-natal depression, she becomes stressed and starts taking it out on those closest to her. Rachel contemplates smothering Harry and then her friends convince her to seek help.

She returned to work at the hospital to clear her head, a patient called Jane goes into labour but her baby dies. She blames Rachel because of her standard of treatment. Rachel is suspended whilst under investigation. She tries to ruin her career and harass Rachel. Jane kidnaps Harry and he is gone for days. Charlie Buckton (Esther Anderson) eventually tracks Harry down and returns him home safely. Rachel wrongly diagnoses a child with deafness, becomes friendly with the father, she becomes angry at Tony for selling his share in the gym because of the not so good financial status. Rachel becomes annoyed at Tony's feud with John Palmer (Shane Withington) and his subsequent obsession with boxing, all of which strains their relationship.

Rachel is offered a new job in Boston, in the United States. Tony refuses to go with Rachel, claiming that Summer Bay is his home and is angry with Rachel when she buys herself a plane ticket without telling him. Rachel then realises that Tony does not want to leave Summer Bay as his dead son Jack (Paul O'Brien), is buried in the local cemetery. Rachel tells Tony that she will stay in Summer Bay for him. Feeling guilty, Tony then changes him mind and agrees to go to America with Rachel. Rachel and Harry accompany Tony to Jack's grave to say goodbye and they then leave.

== Reception ==
In 2007, Mathews received the Logie for "New Female Talent" for her portrayal of Rachel. Mathews was nominated for "Best Actress" and "Best Couple" for her relationship with Kim at the 2007 Inside Soap Awards. Soap opera reporting website Holy Soap describe Rachel's most memorable moment as: "Being taken hostage by the Believers cult, who tried to force her to deliver Tasha's baby." They also pass comment on the fact Rachel has been kidnapped four times calling it a staggering amount. Upon Rachel and Tony's departure, the website also admitted they were fans of Rachel and Tony stating: "If anyone deserves true love, then it's these two! There were sighs of relief all round when they finally tied the knot (their first attempt having been ruined by another pesky kidnapping) and they later welcomed beautiful baby son Harry."

Yvette Chegwidden writing for TV Week said that Rachel and Tony "said a sad farewell". She opined that it looked like the couple were going to end up in "splitsville" but "thankfully" Tony came to his senses. While Chegwidden noted that their exit "wasn't the most dramatic", she opined that viewers were "pleased it was a happy one".

Inside Soap ran a poll asking their readers to decide who Rachel should be with out of Hugh and Kim. The results indicated that they wanted Rachel to be with Hugh – who received fifty-seven percent of the vote.
