= Drew Curtis (Home and Away) =

- Home and Away character
- Portrayed by: Bobby Morley
- Duration: 2006–2008
- First appearance: 7 July 2006
- Last appearance: 21 March 2008
- Introduced by: Julie McGauran
In-universe information
- Occupation: Student; Barman; Mechanic
- Father: Peter Baker
- Mother: Jazz Curtis
- Stepfather: Kevin Freeman
- Stepmother: Amanda Vale
- Sisters: Bree Freeman (step); Essie Freeman (step); Belle Taylor (step)
- Grandfathers: Kevin Baker
- Grandmothers: Noelene Baker
- Uncles: Dan Baker
- First cousins: Ryan Baker

Andrew "Drew" Curtis is a fictional character from the Australian soap opera Home and Away, played by Bobby Morley. He made his first screen appearance during the episode broadcast on 7 July 2006. He departed on 21 March 2008.

== Casting ==
While performing in a production of Angels with Dirty Faces, Morley was noticed by the Home and Away casting agents, who invited him for an audition. The chance to audition for Drew came up and Morley was cast in the role, despite being older than the character. Morley relocated from Melbourne to Sydney for the show and he admitted that he was quite nervous during his first six weeks on set and that he had to get used to the fast speed at which they shoot scenes.

Morley quit Home and Away at the end of 2007. Of his reason for leaving, Morley said "It wasn't a good place to be in. Home and Away is a great place to learn, but it's a machine and it can chew people up and spit them out. I stepped out not really caring whether I had another job." Morley told The Daily Telegraph that he often had to take his shirt off for scenes and that he was treated like a "meat puppet" on the show.

== Character development ==
Morley told The Age that Drew is "very strong-willed and stubborn and headstrong", which was similar to how he was when he was seventeen. Drew is also quite defensive and independent. Morley added "I do remember what I was like when I was younger and I thought that I knew everything and it's quite easy to go back to that mentality when I'm playing Drew." The official Home and Away website described Drew as "brooding" and having a "chip on his shoulder the size of Queensland." Drew is cocky, tough and a bit of a loner. Despite giving off the impression that he does not need anyone, Drew desperately wants love and acceptance. An Inside Soap writer branded him "a new bad boy" for the show and said he would cause trouble upon his arrival.

Drew ruins his relationship with Belle Taylor (Jessica Tovey) when he has an affair with her mother Amanda Vale (Holly Brisley). Morley told Inside Soap that the storyline was uncomfortable for both himself and Brisley. He said, "It was such an intense storyline, and Holly and I put a lot of work into figuring out how to play the scenes." Morley explained that it was a hard thing to motivate why Amanda would have sex with her daughter's boyfriend and why Drew would go along with it all. Tovey said Belle was left "angry and humiliated", when she discovered the reason Drew ended their relationship. She added that though Drew felt terrible about his actions, Belle was unable to forgive his deceit because "she thinks he and Amanda are as bad as each other."

== Storylines ==
Drew comes to Summer Bay when he learns of his father Peter Baker's (Nicholas Bishop) death. He leaves boarding school to attend the memorial. His uncle, Dan Baker (Tim Campbell) is surprised, but allows Drew to stay with him and his partner Leah Patterson-Baker (Ada Nicodemou). Drew develops feelings for Belle. Although Dan is against this, Drew and Belle begin dating. But Drew breaks up with Belle after he falls for her mother, Amanda. Although, after her relationship with Lucas Holden (Rhys Wakefield), Drew and Belle are reunited as a couple. Drew briefly breaks up with Belle again when he discovers that she knew about Amanda's affair with Peter.

After all the events that have occurred, Drew decides to leave Summer Bay. On his way out of town, a masked man drags Drew out of his car and drives him to an abandoned building. The mystery captor is his father, Peter. The mystery of Peter's fake death is revealed during the kidnapping. He explains to Drew that he was in witness protection from Dennis Gillen (Danny Adcock) and Drew decides that he wanted to get to know his father. When Dennis and his men show up at the building, Peter tells Drew to run and get help, but Drew hears a gunshot and he breaks down crying. But Peter is not dead and Drew's relationship with his father grows.

Drew breaks up with Belle and decides to leave Summer Bay and go to the city. Jazz Curtis (Rachel Gordon), Drew's mother, who arrived to buy Amanda's house, and Ric Dalby (Mark Furze) go to the city to persuade him to come back, but fail. He lives with Amanda and Peter in the city.

== Reception ==
For his portrayal of Drew, Morley was nominated for the Logie Award for Most Popular New Male Talent in 2007. Scott Ellis of The Sun-Herald branded Drew a "teenage tearaway." While Paul Kalina of The Age called him a "bad-boy heart-throb."
