= Scott Hunter (Home and Away) =

- Home and Away character
- Portrayed by: Kip Gamblin
- Duration: 2003–2005
- First appearance: 23 January 2003
- Last appearance: 25 November 2005
- Book appearances: Dani on Trial; Home and Away: Mayday
- Spin-off appearances: Hearts Divided
In-universe information
- Occupation: Boat worker
- Father: Jack Hunter
- Mother: Beth Hunter
- Stepfather: Rhys Sutherland (2004–2005)
- Brothers: Robbie Hunter; Henry Hunter
- Sisters: Kit Hunter; Matilda Hunter
- Wife: Mira Sardelic (until 2003); Hayley Smith (2007–)
- Sons: Noah Hunter
- Grandfathers: Graham Walters
- Nephews: Archie Hunter Hyde

Scott John Hunter is a fictional character from the Australian soap opera Home and Away, played by Kip Gamblin. He made his first on-screen appearance on 23 January 2003. The character was riding a white horse onto the beach, where he was spotted by Dani Sutherland. Scott departed on 25 November 2005.

== Casting ==
Gamblin previously made a guest appearance in the serial as Patrick Curl in 2001, before he joined the main cast as Scott, which also marked his first major television role.

== Storylines ==
Scott is first seen riding his horse, Jacko, while helping a search party find an ill Alf Stewart (Ray Meagher), who has been missing. Scott meets Dani Sutherland (Tammin Sursok) and they become attracted to one another and begin a relationship. Scott later purchases the local boatshed previously owned by Rob Storey (Matthew Lilley) but finds himself at odds with Dani's ex-boyfriend Josh West (Daniel Collopy), who wants to start a development on the land where the boatshed is based. The boatshed is later burned out.

After a misunderstanding where several residents think Scott and Dani are getting engaged, Scott uses this chance for Dani to meet his mother, Beth (Clarissa House). When a woman named Mira Sardelic (Hollie Andrew) arrives in the bay, it is revealed that she is Scott's wife and they married in a bid to keep her in Australia. Mira insists she still wants to be with Scott but realises he does not feel the same way and leaves. When Scott's teenage sister, Kit (Amy Mizzi) arrives in town, he has to contend with her alcoholism.

Scott later purchases a 50% share in Alf's boat, The Blaxland and later hires Kane Phillips (Sam Atwell) as a deckhand, not knowing his identity but soon sacks him after he learns Kane raped Dani two years prior. When Dani stands trial for running over Kane, Scott supports her but Dani is found guilty and imprisoned. Shortly after Dani is released, the couple move in together after Summer Bay House becomes crowded when their respective families combine during Beth's engagement and subsequent marriage to Dani's father Rhys (Michael Beckley).

When Dani is harassed by Felix Walters (Josh Lawson), one of her fellow students at Yabbie Creek University, Scott and Kane warn him off. Shortly after, Felix is hospitalized after a vicious beating. It emerges that Viv "The Guv" Standish (Maggie Kirkpatrick), one of Dani's prison friends had sent some people to attack Felix. Scott later goes on a fishing trip and a policewoman arrives to inform Dani and their housemates of his death. However, Scott returns alive and well the following day, unaware of what has transpired.

When Scott and Dani's friends Noah Lawson (Beau Brady) and Hayley Smith (Bec Cartwright) are due to marry, Dani suggests they get married too but the couple joining Noah on their day are Dani's sister Kirsty (Christie Hayes) and Kane who are renewing their vows.

Scott and Dani find themselves on the receiving end of some vicious attacks including Dani having her hands burned with acid. The culprit is revealed to be Felix's girlfriend, Sarah Lewis (Luisa Hastings-Edge). Scott and Dani decide to join Hayley and Noah on their honeymoon to Paris but on the day of departure, they forget their passports and when they return to their home, they find Sarah holding a gun. Scott is forced at gunpoint to drive Sarah to Leah Patterson's (Ada Nicodemou) house where several other bay residents are hiding. An armed siege culminates in Sarah shooting Noah dead, knocking out Detective Peter Baker (Nicholas Bishop) and shooting herself.

Following Noah's funeral, Scott proposes to Dani again and she accepts and they begin making plans. But When Dani gets a call from "The Guv" who is terminally ill in hospital and begins working on her memoirs, This puts a strain on Scott and Dani's relationship and they split, and Dani leaves Summer Bay for good. Scott then begins drinking heavily and Kit returns to help sort him out as he had done with her before. Scott decides to leave with Kit to spend the Christmas break in Paris.

When Scott returns in the New Year, he is left homeless after a fire is caused by a faulty fan and he moves back in with Beth. He becomes close to Hayley and they sleep together one night. Soon after Hayley becomes involved with Kim Hyde (Chris Hemsworth) and Scott begins dating a girl called Lisa. It soon emerges that Lisa is already married and she and Scott split.

Hayley becomes pregnant and she is unsure of who the father is; both Kim and Scott participate in the paternity test. Kim is believed to be the father, and Scott and Hayley decide to resume their relationship but Hayley calls it off wanting to be with Kim. During this Scott beings a relationship with Amanda Vale (Holly Brisley). Hayley and Kim later become engaged and prepare to marry.

Amanda realises Scott and Hayley still want to be with each other, she takes a boat out to sea in a storm and Scott goes after her, resulting in the pair going missing. The wedding is delayed but Scott and Amanda are found. Amanda tells Scott she is pregnant too and he believes her. After faking an ultrasound and subsequent miscarriage, Amanda's deceit is soon uncovered and Scott dumps her.

Hayley later goes into labour but is in a secluded location after leaving town following Amanda's scheming. She is found by Scott when he searches for her with Alf and Kim. Scott delivers the baby and Hayley names the child Noah after her late husband.

Scott and Hayley get back together and decide to leave Australia for Paris. Kim is against them taking baby Noah with them and fights against them. When Kim is hit by a car leaving the hearing and admitted to the hospital, it emerges his blood type doesn't match Noah's and Scott is revealed to be the biological father. Scott and Hayley then leave.

== Reception ==
For his portrayal of Scott, Gamblin won the "Most Popular New Male Talent" Logie Award in 2004. Linda Barnier of the Newcastle Herald described Scott as a "beefcake" and opined that his debut on his horse Jacko was a "very Man from Snowy River moment".
