= Jack Holden (Home and Away) =

Fictional character from Home and Away

- Home and Away character
- Portrayed by: Paul O'Brien
- Duration: 2005–2009
- First appearance: 5 August 2005
- Last appearance: 20 January 2009
- Introduced by: Julie McGauran
In-universe information
- Occupation: Police officer
- Father: Tony Holden
- Mother: Kate Holden
- Stepmother: Rachel Armstrong
- Brothers: Lucas Holden
- Half-brothers: Harry Holden
- Wife: Martha MacKenzie (2006–2007, 2008–2009); Sam Tolhurst (2007–2008)
- Stepsons: Rory Tolhurst
- Stepdaughters: Lindsay MacKenzie
- Aunts: Gina Austin
- First cousins: Hugo Austin; Xavier Austin

Jack Holden is a fictional character from the Australian television soap opera Home and Away, played by Paul O'Brien. The character made his first screen appearance during the episode broadcast on 5 August 2005. Jack is a police officer and part of the Holden family, which also consists of his brother Lucas Holden (Rhys Wakefield) and their father Tony Holden (Jon Sivewright), who were also introduced during 2005. Jack's main relationship storylines are with Martha MacKenzie (Jodi Gordon) and Sam Holden (Jessica Chapnik). O'Brien decided to leave the series in 2008 and in the 2008 season finale, Jack was accidentally shot in the chest at a construction site by fellow police officer, Angelo Rosetta (Luke Jacobz). In the first episode of the 2009 season, it was revealed that Jack had died after paramedics failed to revive him. O'Brien made his last appearance as Jack during the episode broadcast on 20 January 2009.

== Casting ==
O'Brien was trying to break into the Melbourne comedy circuit, while waiting for an acting job, when he secured the role of Jack. He relocated to Sydney within five days and called the process "a bit of a head spin." He found it an easy decision to move and said Sydney felt like home, despite initially having nowhere to live. O'Brien stayed with his new co-star Jon Sivewright, who plays his character's father Tony Holden. They were introduced together, along with Rhys Wakefield who plays Jack's younger brother Lucas Holden.

== Development ==
Jack is introduced as the show's new police officer. O'Brien described him as "a fun-loving, likeable character, very caring and compassionate". Of Jack's future storylines, Carolyn Stewart of TV Week said there would be a mystery in the Holden family's past and a potential love interest.

Most of Jack's storylines were central to his on-off relationship with Martha MacKenzie (Jodi Gordon). Viewers saw the couple go through marriage, divorce, a second marriage and Martha being widowed. Martha and Jack's first marriage is cut short because they argue to much, Martha leaves Jack. They start to lead separate lives, but Jack is there for Martha after she has an abortion, Martha who is feeling low at this point kisses him, Jack's girlfriend Sam Tolhurst (Jessica Chapnik) sees this. Of the situation during an interview with Yahoo, O'Brien stated: "I think Jack felt like "Oh this is nice, but I've moved on, I've finally moved on and found someone, but deep down he still wants Martha." O'Brien added that he believes Jack was always in love with Martha, even whilst with he was in a relationship with Sam. Both O'Brien and Gordon agreed that when Jack and Martha first broke up it was a bad time for Jack, as his life was spiraling out of control, he needed her, but she left him when he needed her the most. They later become friends in an unlikely turn of events, O'Brien believed it hard to understand how Jack could be so forgiving towards her.

Whilst the characters were separated on-screen, they had gained a fan base on the Internet that believed Jack should be with Martha and wanted the pair to reunite. Gordon herself backed the pairing, stating that she believed they should be together and perfect for each other. Whilst interviewed she said: "I actually love Jack and Martha together, I'm a sucker for romance so, I want want them to be together [...] I want them to continue on, [...] the timing is not right, they are not mature enough. Jack's in a relationship with someone else as Martha is, there just seems to be things getting in the way of them getting back together all the time." Gordon also hoped for a happy ever after type ending for the two characters if they were to ever leave the serial commenting: "If I had it my way, and I got to write the scripts then I'd make it happily ever after, Martha and Jack riding off into the sunset." Gordon has spoken of her understanding from the audiences point of view, that together Jack and Martha are "the ultimate couple". She also reiterated her belief that it would be to tough at the time of Martha's downward spiral for them to work together, but if Martha is to get through her troubles and have a happy ending, that it would be with Jack.

On-screen Jack and Martha later reconcile, he helps her through her hard times. Gordon believed that their relationship was at its strongest peak whilst she had breast cancer. During an interview with What's on TV Gordon spoke of the state of their relationship stating: "Martha and Jack have been through more than most and right now their relationship is as solid as it could be. But she's taking a big chance not being honest about her pregnancy."

== Storylines ==
Jack arrives with his father, Tony and brother, Lucas in Summer Bay. It is quickly revealed Jack is responsible for the death of a teenage girl in a shootout. The girl's father, Harry Chambers (Rodney Dobsen) arrives in town holding Jack responsible for his daughter's death. Following all the furore, A town meeting is held and it is revealed Jack had returned fire in self-defence and the locals believe him. Martha MacKenzie is often frosty towards Jack but he refuses to give up on her. They begins various contest against each other including a pool competition with a nudie run stipulation and a drinking contest. These games backfire when Martha exploits Jack's deathly fear of spiders and plants one in his room. Jack discovers it after coming out of the shower and falls and hits his head. He then rushed to hospital and is operated on but suffers temporary hearing loss. Upon finding out Martha is responsible, He is angry with her but later forgives her after she threatens to jump off a cliff after he jokingly suggests so.

Jack's colleague Corey Henderson (Adam Saunders) takes an interest in Martha and she reciprocates, leading to Jack's jealousy. When Jack finds that Corey is poisoning Irene Roberts (Lynne McGranger) he tries to warn Martha but she puts it down to his jealousy. Martha then agrees to move away with Corey to the city. Jack tries to stop them but they have already left. Martha figures out Jack is telling the truth and is rescued just in time. At Noah Smith's christening, Jack and Martha get back together. Jack and Martha begin talking about settling down and being a family and Jack fakes being cold on the marriage idea. However he gets a shock when it looks like Martha is the one having second thoughts and is further surprised when she proposes. Jack and Martha marry at St. James' Church with their friends and family present but the reception is ruined when Eve Jacobsen (Emily Perry) the Summer Bay stalker causes an explosion which kills her, Tracey Thompson (Sarah Enright) and Elaine Armstrong (Julie Hudspeth) and leaves several other including Jack and Martha. Rachel Armstrong (Amy Mathews) arranges for a group of burn victims to be airlifted to the city for surgery and Martha is among the casualties. The helicopter crashes, leaving the party missing for several weeks, presumed dead. They are eventually found by Rescue teams on their final attempt.

Following an argument not long after, Martha accuses Jack of not putting enough effort into the marriage and being at work too much and she moves out. They separate and when Jack is badly beaten, Martha donates blood to him but admits to Alf Stewart (Ray Meagher) she no longer loves Jack. Ash Nader (Ben Guerens), an old friend of Jack arrives and takes an interest in Martha and they become a couple. Jack finally realises his marriage is over and moves on with Sam, his physiotherapist and becomes close to her son Rory (Jack Rickard; Ed Wills). Shane Deeks (Mike Duncan), Sam's ex-husband arrives in Summer Bay and tries to snatch Rory. He is foiled by Jack but Sam and Rory leave. Jack's attentions are back on Martha when she enters a downward spiral after finding out Ash is married with children. He is further shocked when attending Peter Baker's (Nicholas Bishop) stag night to find Martha working as a pole dancer. Jack then battles Cam Reynolds (Ashley Lyons), Martha's boss and boyfriend and tries to frame him for drug dealing but Cam twists the situation by framing Martha. Jack then destroys the evidence when Martha is arrested. Cam torches the club and Jack saves Martha.

Following death of Tony's partner, Beth Hunter (Clarissa House), Jack supports Tony and Lucas. Jack is part of a crew that go missing on a boat in a storm and when the others return he is not with them prompting worry. However, Jack never boarded. Martha goes over to house to call off the divorce but finds a newly returned Sam and Rory. George Watson (Paul Barry) frames Jack for a bank robbery and shoots Colin Marshall (Nathan Page), the shooter and frames Jack then shoots Jack. Jack remains comatose for several days and when he awakes he realises it is Martha he loves, not Sam. When Rory overhears Martha suggesting Jack postpone the wedding, Sam gets angry and bans Martha from attending. Jack and Sam marry but when they return from their honeymoon, they discover escaped criminal Johnny Cooper is hiding out. Sam later kills Johnny by hitting him over the head with a baseball bat.

When Jack finds out about Sam's drug deals via a letter left by Johnny, he ends the marriage with her and he threatens to call the police. Sam tells him she is pregnant and he gives her 12 hours to leave town. His day is further exacerbated when he sees Martha on a date with Roman Harris (Conrad Coleby). Jack hands in the letter but Sam with one final act of revenge lets the police know about him tampering with the evidence from Martha's previous arrest. Jack leaves the bay for a while but is alarmed to discover Sam's body has been found washed up on the beach, leaving him a prime suspect in the murder. Ross Buckton (David Downer) investigates the case and has a theory that Jack and Martha killed Sam because she was in the way of their relationship. Martha's great aunt Morag Bellingham (Cornelia Frances) submits the theory that Sam committed suicide and made it look like murder, which is revealed to be true and Jack and Martha are exonerated. Following Sam's funeral, Jack and Martha get closer and she breaks up with Roman and they reunite. Martha proposes again and Jack accepts. Martha soon finds she is pregnant but is unsure of the child's paternity and they have a test which proves Roman is the biological father. Jack is upset but wants to stay with Martha regardless. They marry in the hospital chapel, but Martha is suffering from breast cancer; she collapses several hours later and suffers a miscarriage. Martha recovers after extensive chemotherapy. After acting on a tip from Belle Taylor (Jessica Tovey), who works for the Coastal News, Jack investigates a development site where toxic waste is buried, causing a cancer cluster. He is upset and blames the developers for Martha's illness and is determined to bring them to justice. Jack visits the site at night and is shot in the chest by Angelo Rosetta (Luke Jacobz). Tony arrives on the scene and tries to revive him but he is too late and Jack dies. He later reappears as a vision to a grief-stricken Martha.

== Reception ==
O'Brien earned various awards nominations for his portrayal of Jack. In 2006, O'Brien won a Logie Award for "Most Popular New Male Talent". The 2007 and 2008 ceremonies saw O'Brien nominated for "Most Popular Actor". O'Brien was nominated for "Best Newcomer" and "Best Couple" along with co-star Jodi Gordon. At the 2007 Inside Soap Awards, O'Brien and Gordon were nominated for "Best Storyline" for Jack and Martha's wedding day. The following year, O'Brien was nominated for "Best Actor", "Sexiest Male" and "Best Couple" with Gordon. At the first Digital Spy Soap Awards, O'Brien was nominated for "Best On-Screen Partnership" with Gordon.
