= Annie Campbell =

- Home and Away character
- Portrayed by: Charlotte Best
- Duration: 2007–2010
- First appearance: Episode 4443; 20 June 2007
- Last appearance: Episode 5063; 28 April 2010
- Introduced by: Cameron Welsh
In-universe information
- Occupation: Student
- Father: Jim Campbell
- Mother: Tania Campbell
- Brothers: Geoff Campbell
- Grandfathers: Bruce Campbell

Annie Campbell is a fictional character from the Australian soap opera Home and Away, played by Charlotte Best. The actress was thirteen when she was offered the role of Annie. She made her first screen appearance as Annie during the episode broadcast on 20 June 2007. Best left the serial in 2010 so she could concentrate on her studies.

Annie was introduced to Home and Away along with her older brother, Geoff (Lincoln Lewis). Both teenagers were raised by their strict religious grandfather Bruce (Chris Haywood). Annie was an "innocent farm girl", who was also intelligent, "unusual" and impressionable. A notable storyline for the character involved her becoming trapped in a storm drain and being rescued by Charlie Buckton (Esther Anderson). Annie began flirting with Romeo Smith (Luke Mitchell) and they briefly dated before she decided to leave for Japan as part of a student exchange programme. For her portrayal of Annie, Best was nominated for Most Popular New Female Talent at the 2008 Logie Awards.

== Casting ==
Best was offered the role of Annie after she began studying at the Sydney performing arts school, Brent Street, where her talent agency, which helped her secure the part, is based. Best was thirteen when she joined the cast. Her family relocated from the Central Coast to Mosman, New South Wales, In early 2010, Best decided to leave the series to concentrate on her studies. Annie's exit storyline saw her leave Australia to study in Japan as part of an exchange student programme. In June of that year, Sarah Ellis from Inside Soap confirmed that there were no plans for Best to reprise her role shortly.

== Development ==
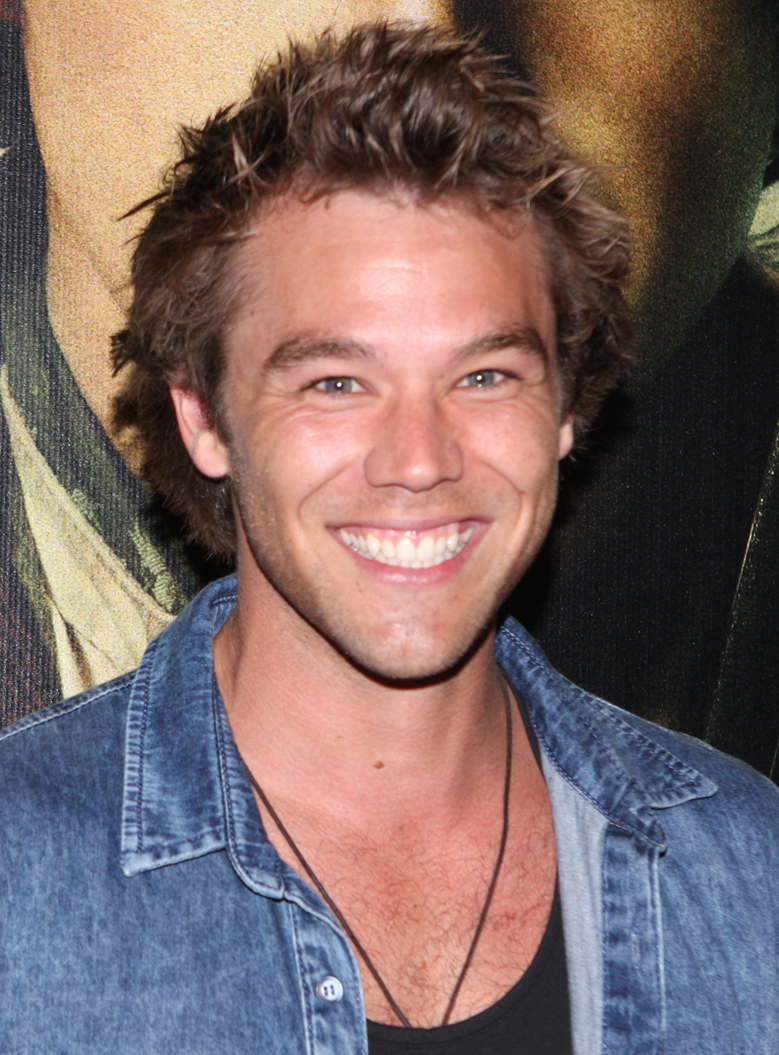
Lincoln Lewis played Annie's brother Geoff.

A writer from RTÉ.ie said that Annie is an "innocent farm girl" who would "have her life turned on its head" upon her arrival. Annie was described on the serial's official website as being "bright and unusual". Annie and her brother Geoff (Lincoln Lewis) were raised by their "Bible-bashing" grandfather, Bruce (Chris Haywood), after their parents died. Annie is intelligent but has dyslexia and Bruce thought that she was "slow" and subsequently prevented her from going to school. They added that she is "a strange mix of knowing farm waif and innocent child, partly muddled by old-fashioned religious morality." Annie can be a "handful" at times but school tamed her. She gradually transforms into a young woman and takes an interest in males. She is also "very protective" over Geoff. Lewis told a reporter from Inside Soap that Annie and Geoff have a "natural brother-and-sister chemistry" because they both have siblings off-screen and were able to relate to it. He added that their off-screen rapport; which consisted of them "taking the mickey" out of each other also helped.

In one storyline Annie becomes trapped in a storm drain and Charlie Buckton (Esther Anderson) attempts to save her. Anderson told Jason Herbison from Inside Soap that "Annie's stuck down this drain, trapped behind a grille. To make matters worse there is a storm coming and the water level is rising." With the rapid intake of water, Charlie cannot wait for the emergency services to arrive and dives in to save her. Anderson explained that her character only cares about getting Annie to safety and risks her life. She manages to free Annie, but is swept away by the current. Roman Harris (Conrad Coleby) manages to save Charlie and they are all taken to safety. Off-screen storm drain scenes created many logistical challenges for the production team to overcome. They had a set built especially for the scenes and turbulent waves were created by jets placed under the water. Anderson added that "it was absolutely freezing. Filming was tough work, but I think the finished result is worth it."

Annie begins a "cute" flirtation with Romeo Smith (Luke Mitchell), but it is cut short when she leaves Summer Bay for Japan. Annie later makes a surprise return and TV Week's Carolyn Stewart said it would give "the lovebirds a chance to rekindle the flame." Best believed that while Romeo may have gotten over his sadness at Annie's departure, he would still be waiting and hoping for her to return. She further explained that while Annie stayed in contact with Romeo and she has grown up, it would not all be smooth sailing – though there would be fun times ahead for them. In April 2010, Mitchell revealed that Romeo and Annie would go on their first date. He explained "Even though they have a history, they haven't been on an official date before, so Romeo asks her out and make a pretty special night for them." Romeo gets the keys to the school theatre and organises a romantic setting for Annie. Mitchell believed the scenes would make some female viewers want their boyfriend's to do the same for them. Best agreed saying "We had so much fun filming their first date. It was really special. I think a lot of people are going to fall in love with Romeo all over again after watching it." The actress promised viewers would enjoy her character's return, though she did not say how long she would be back for. She added that the storyline between Annie and Romeo would be very funny and intensely romantic to keep the audience on their toes.

== Storylines ==
Annie and her brother Geoff find Martha MacKenzie (Jodi Gordon) camped out in the paddock on their farm and they give her a lift back to Summer Bay. Sally Fletcher (Kate Ritchie) enquires about Annie's schooling and Bruce tells her Annie is being home schooled, but it soon becomes apparent that Bruce is lying. Annie enrols at Summer Bay High and Lucas Holden (Rhys Wakefield) helps her, but Geoff sees Lucas as a bad person and continually argues with him. After falling asleep due to farm work and study one day, Annie crashes out on Lucas' bed and is found by Bruce who assumes the worst and drags her home. Belle Taylor (Jessica Tovey) notices Annie has a crush on Lucas and mentions to her that Lucas lost his virginity to her; which horrifies Annie. Matters are made worse when Belle gives her a teen magazine with a sealed sex and relationships section, which Bruce mistakes for pornography. Annie is then locked in her room after being ordered to pray for forgiveness.

After Tony Holden (Jon Sivewright) learns of Annie's imprisonment, he forces Bruce to release her and Annie and Geoff move in with him and Lucas. Annie complains of being in pain and bleeding one day and assumes she is dying, but Irene Roberts (Lynne McGranger) discovers she is beginning her menstrual cycle and convinces Tony to let Annie move in with her and Belle. Annie and Geoff are reconciled with Bruce after he suffers a heart attack and is hospitalised but Bruce dies after suffering a second heart attack, leaving Annie and Geoff devastated as he was the only family they had following their parents' deaths. Annie loses her faith after local Reverend John Hall (Paul Tassone) dies following botched brain surgery and she gets drunk. Aden Jefferies (Todd Lasance) finds her and is blamed for her condition as he previously supplied Tamsyn Armstrong (Gabrielle Scollay) with alcohol. Morag Bellingham (Cornelia Frances) convinces Annie to tell the truth and Aden is exonerated. Jai Fernandez (Jordan Rodrigues) arrives in the Bay and befriends Annie. When Jai begins doing dangerous stunts, Annie is injured while performing a similar stunt to show him how it affects people who care about him; they are forbidden from seeing each other. Irene and Jai's foster father, Miles Copeland (Josh Quong Tart) eventually relent. Annie is worried that Jai wants a sexual relationship with her, but he sets her straight. The couple are nearly killed when Kane Phillips' (Sam Atwell) car swerves to avoid Melody Jones (Celeste Dodwell) and crashes into the school.

Annie and Jai break up when Jai reveals he does want to take their relationship further. Things are strained further when Irene suffers an alcoholic relapse after being wrongly imprisoned for killing her new partner Lou De Bono (David Roberts). Annie tries to pour away Irene's alcohol and is slapped for doing so. Dexter Walker (Tom Green) supports Annie when she learns Belle is dying of cancer. Following Belle's death, Annie is touched when Dexter arranges an album of photos Belle had taken and kisses him. They begin dating in secret so they do not hurt Jai, but he finds out. Dexter and his family leave the Bay and Annie becomes attracted to Jai's friend, Romeo Smith. They begin dating, but the relationship is cut short when Annie and Jai are both accepted into the student exchange program. Annie returns several months later and resumes things with Romeo when they spend time together working on a reversed gender performance of Romeo and Juliet. After things fail to develop further, Annie returns to Japan.

== Reception ==
For her portrayal of Annie, Best was nominated in the category of Most Popular New Female Talent at the 2008 Logie Awards. A writer from Holy Soap described her most memorable moment as "finally breaking out of her tough grandfather's shadow and becoming a Summer Bay woman." When it was revealed that Bruce had a heart condition, a writer for the Daily Record commented "the thought of shy-as-a-mouse teen Annie getting embroiled in a fight would be enough to do the old man in. Sadly, the youngster does lash out, but at least she's justified – she has a go at a school bully. Perhaps Bruce's decision to keep the youngster and her brother away from society wasn't such a bad one?"

Another columnist from the Daily Record said that Annie's drinking binges that occurred when she began losing her faith were "drastic measures". A reporter from the same paper called Annie "impressionable" and quipped that she wandered around the Bay "with her tongue hanging out" when she met the "stylish and confident" Nicole Franklin. Annie was also branded a busybody and a "feeble-minded teenager" by writers for the paper.
