= Geoff Campbell =

- Home and Away character
- Portrayed by: Lincoln Lewis
- Duration: 2007–10
- First appearance: 20 June 2007
- Last appearance: 12 February 2010
- Introduced by: Cameron Welsh
In-universe information
- Occupation: Student; Missionary
- Father: Jim Campbell
- Mother: Tania Campbell
- Sisters: Annie Campbell
- Grandfathers: Bruce Campbell

Geoffrey "Geoff" Campbell is a fictional character from the Australian soap opera Home and Away, played by Lincoln Lewis. The actor spent two years auditioning for a role on the show, before he was offered the part of Geoff. He was surprised to get the part as he thought his audition had not been very good. Lewis relocated to Sydney for filming and he cut his long hair for the character. His casting was announced on 17 June 2007, while he made his first screen appearance during the episode broadcast on 20 June 2007. After two years on the show, Lewis quit Home and Away and filmed his final scenes on 18 September 2009. The character made his screen exit on 12 February 2010.

Geoff was portrayed as being an innocent, honest and sensible teenager throughout his duration. Geoff was a devout Christian and a rugby league footballer. He and his sister Annie (Charlotte Best) were raised by their religious grandfather, Bruce (Chris Haywood) on the family farm, following their parents deaths. Due to his upbringing, Geoff's social skills were not the same as other teenagers his age. Geoff developed an "on and off" friendship with Aden Jefferies (Todd Lasance) and his storylines often revolved around his romantic relationships. Geoff's first love interest was the equally inexperienced Melody Jones (Celeste Dodwell). He then dated Nicole Franklin (Tessa James) and lost his virginity to her, while they were stranded on an island. Geoff also dated Claudia Hammond (Alexandra Park) and was led to believe that he was the father of her baby. For his portrayal of Geoff, Lewis won the Most Popular New Male Talent Logie Award.

== Casting ==
On 17 June 2007, Angela Cuming of The Sun-Herald reported Lewis had joined the cast of Home and Away. The actor had previously auditioned for a role on the show for two years, before finally impressing the producers. During an interview published in Inside Soap, Lewis revealed that he had auditioned for Ric Dalby in 2004, making it down to the final three, before Mark Furze got the part. Then in 2007, Lewis auditioned for Drew Curtis and made it to the final two – only for Bobby Morley to be given the role. Of the moment he learned he had secured a role in Home and Away, Lewis said "I was in a furniture shop with my mum and aunty when [the producers] called to say I had got the job. I started screaming and running around. I am just so stoked to be here doing this and it still hasn't really sunk in yet." Lewis was surprised to get the role of Geoff as he thought his audition had been "terrible". Lewis relocated to Sydney, where Home and Away is shot, and he had to cut his long hair short for the part. Lewis made his screen debut as Geoff on 20 June 2007.

== Development ==
=== Characterisation ===
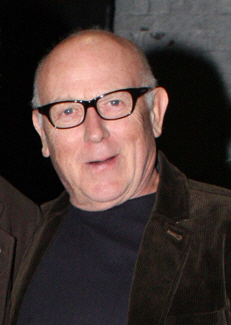
Chris Haywood played Geoff's grandfather, Bruce.

Prior to his introduction, Geoff was described as being a farm boy, a football player and Summer Bay High's newest student. Carolyn Stewart from TV Week thought Geoff was an innocent, sporty teenager. Lewis stated that the first thing he knew about Geoff was that he was a rugby league footballer. He was "over the moon" as football and acting were two of his passions in his life. The actor thought Geoff's best quality was his honesty, but observed that his social skills were not up to "a normal teenager's standards". A writer for the show's official website described Geoff as being "sensible and serious" and having a "grim, hard-working life". Geoff was a devout Christian, who planned to become a priest when he grew up. Lewis commented that while he was not as "diehard religious" as Geoff, he did believe. He added "Playing this character has been an eye-opening experience for me, as it's allowed me to see things from the perspective of someone who's very strong in their beliefs."

Geoff and his sister Annie (Charlotte Best) were raised by their "super-religious" grandfather, Bruce (Chris Haywood), after their parents died in a car crash. The loss of his parents and the firm hand of his grandfather, helped to shape Geoff into "a very responsible boy who is black and white about right and wrong." Geoff, Annie and Bruce lived at the family farm on the outskirts of Summer Bay and Bruce home-schooled the siblings. However, Geoff was later sent to an all boys boarding school for two years. Lewis agreed that he and Best had a "natural brother-and-sister chemistry" on-screen because they both have siblings in real life and were able to relate to one another. He also said that he and Best got on great and enjoyed "taking the mickey" out of each other like a real brother and sister.

=== Friendship with Aden Jefferies ===
Geoff's love of football and his faith made him stand out from other guys his age. He developed an "on and off" friendship with Aden Jefferies (Todd Lasance). Aden disliked Geoff at first due to the fact that Geoff was more talented at football and to Aden, represented "the hypocrisy of society." Aden was convinced that Geoff was just "as flawed as everyone else, and just as full of sin." The two eventually matured and became friends. Off-screen, Lasance and Lewis were close friends and while they lived together, they learned lines and critiqued each other's performances. After dropping out of school, Geoff found himself at a loose end and thought he and Aden could work together on a prawn trawler. Geoff believed that it was just the thing to pull Aden "out of his funk" following the death of his wife. Aden and Geoff found working together harder than they anticipated and their tempers soon got the better of them. When they clashed over how to repair the trawler, Geoff lashed out and punches were thrown. They both came into contact with the trawler's electric wiring, which left Geoff having to rescue Aden. Lewis loved the constant feud between his and Lasance's characters. He admitted that they would "amp it up" as much as they could.

=== Relationships ===
==== Melody Jones ====
Because of Geoff's background, he was "completely clueless" when it came to girls. He was insecure, but he eventually shared a kiss with the equally inexperienced Melody Jones (Celeste Dodwell). Lewis thought that Geoff and Melody were similar as they were both naive and had sheltered upbringings. Nicole Franklin (Tessa James) took advantage of that and convinced Geoff that Melody "dumped him" because their first kiss was so bad. Nicole told Geoff that if he wanted Melody back, then he would have to become a better kisser and she offered to teach him. Geoff became determined to work things out with Melody and accepted Nicole's help. Speaking to an Inside Soap columnist, Lewis explained "Geoff thinks something's not right about it – surely Melody wouldn't ditch him after just one bad kiss? But every time he sees Melody now, she's stand-offish." Unbeknownst to Geoff, Melody was under the impression that he was being unfaithful to her with Nicole. Having seen them both together, Melody jumped to the wrong conclusion. Nicole did not correct her and went out of her way to stir up trouble. Nicole was frustrated that Geoff was not falling for her, so she set out to sabotage his relationship with Melody instead.

==== Nicole Franklin ====
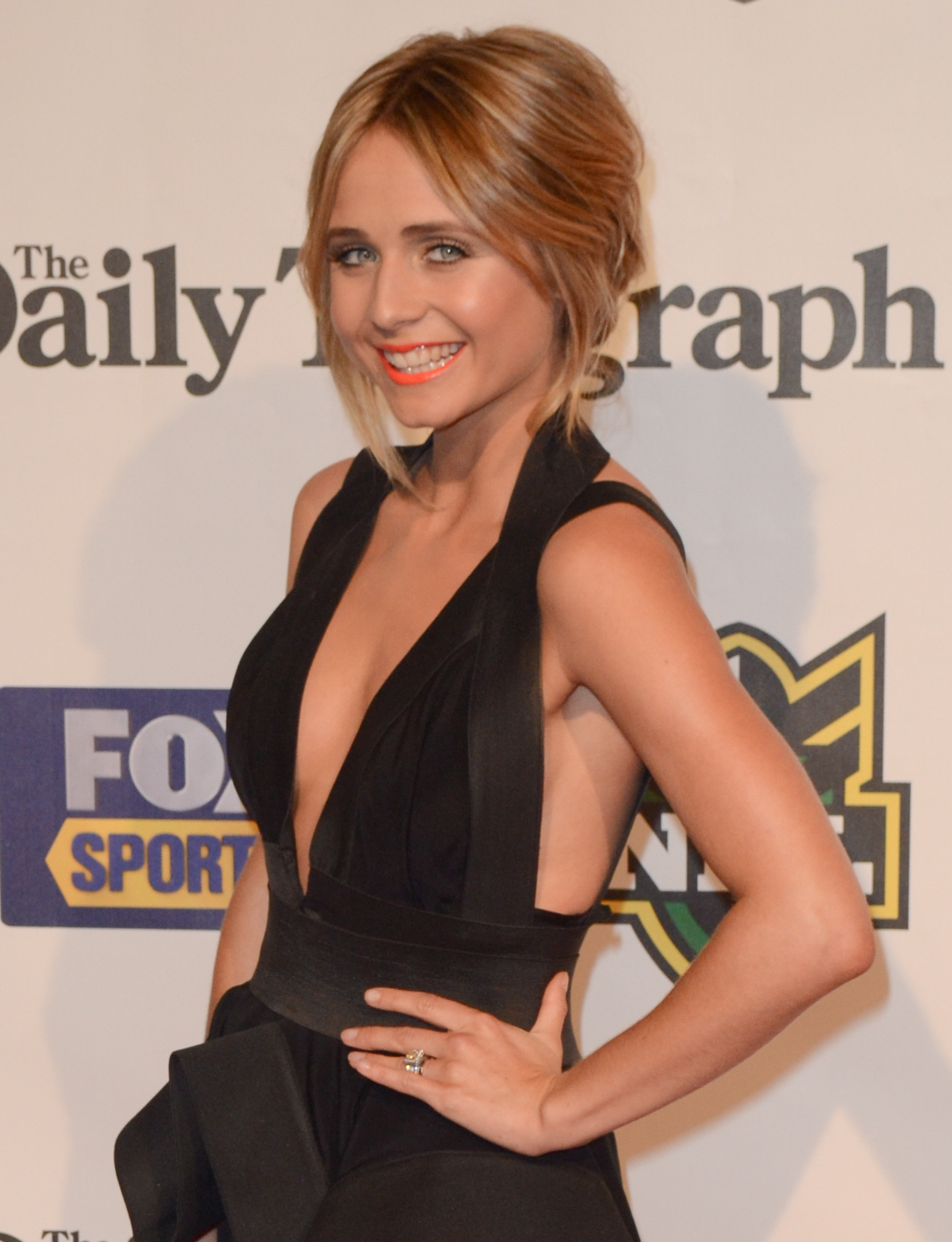
Tessa James played Geoff's love interest Nicole Franklin.

Geoff became involved in "a sordid love triangle" with Melody and Nicole, which left viewers guessing which girl he would end up with. Geoff and Nicole eventually began dating. James thought Nicole was the one for Geoff, but Geoff might not be the one for Nicole. Lewis believed that his character had "deep feelings" for Nicole. During an interview published in Inside Soap, James said Geoff and Nicole were complete opposites, but it worked in their favour. She called their relationship "fiery" and thought they had been through a lot together. Lewis commented that Geoff and Nicole were very similar in some of their traits, as they were both stubborn and opinionated. He told Jason Herbison that when Geoff first started dating Nicole, he had a lot of parents and grandparents tell him that Geoff should be with Melody instead, because Nicole was not a good influence. James believed that if Geoff and Nicole broke up, they would still stay good friends. While Lewis added that as long as Geoff and Nicole wanted to be together, they could work through anything.

Geoff and Nicole were dumped at sea together by Elliot Gillen (Paul Pantano) when he sought revenge against Nicole's father. The couple washed up on a deserted island, where Geoff nursed his injuries from a fight with Elliot. Neither of them knew where they were and were forced to survive without food, clothing and shelter. Geoff and Nicole tried to light a fire and catch some fish, but were not very successful. James called the situation "hopeless", but said that when they found ways to make each other laugh, they realised how much they meant to each other. Lewis thought that it did not help that both of them were almost naked. Geoff lost his virginity to Nicole, which left him feeling guilty because he was saving himself for marriage. At the time, he felt it was right for him, but later believed that he should have been stronger.

Once they were rescued, Geoff and Nicole returned to the Bay and their romance took another shock turn. Because he and Nicole had sex before marriage, Geoff felt the only way to make things right was to ask Nicole to marry him. Geoff believed that if he and Nicole were going to have sex again, they should be married. Though he was not one hundred per cent sure about it, he felt a wedding was the only solution. Lewis did not think a proposal was a good idea and quipped that Geoff was not ready to tie his own shoelaces. The proposal came as a surprise to Nicole, who turned it down and then vented her disgust at the suggestion. James quipped "She's really offended – it's as though Geoff's ashamed of what happened between them." Nicole saw the proposal as an attempt to fix a mistake. Nicole found it odd that Geoff thought they should get married at such a young age, and it killed the passion between them and spoiled their relationship.

When Nicole surprised Geoff with a romantic getaway to the island where they first had sex, the couple were faced with "a homicidal madman" called Derrick Quaid (John Atkinson). The storyline started while Geoff and Nicole's relationship was going through a rough patch. Nicole thought a trip away would help them overcome their issues. Lewis told Stewart that Geoff loved the surprise at first, but everything about Nicole made Geoff question his beliefs about premarital sex and whenever they started to get close, Geoff knew that he could give in again and so he tried to back away. Things got worse for the couple when Derreck, a complete stranger, turned up at their camp. Derreck tried to intimidate Geoff and Nicole and prevented Geoff from calling for help. Geoff and Nicole tried to get away from Derreck, but he pulled out a fishing knife, causing Geoff to panic. When asked if Geoff was scared, Lewis replied "He is – but, to be honest, he's actually more scared for Nicole's life than his own. Being the kind of guy he is, Geoff puts everyone else before himself. He cares about Nicole more than anyone else in the world and would risk everything to save her." Geoff and Nicole's relationship started to crumble and they were constantly "at each other's throats". When Geoff gave her a meaningful gift of a tree cutting, Nicole was unimpressed. Geoff was devastated when he overheard Nicole "dissing" the gift and he broke up with her.

==== Claudia Hammond ====
Geoff started flirting with his primary school friend, Claudia Hammond (Alexandra Park), at a wedding. He made eye contact with her and kept sneaking over to see her. Geoff had only just broken up with Nicole and a TV Week reporter questioned whether it was the "real thing" or a rebound romance. After Geoff had sex with Claudia for the first time, they became trapped in a fire that engulfed their caravan. Lewis told Jason Herbison from Inside Soap that when Geoff awoke to find the caravan in flames, he initially believed that he had gone to hell as punishment for having sex before marriage. The fire was started accidentally when a fight between Jai Fernandez (Jordan Rodrigues) and Trey Palmer (Luke Bracey) got out of hand. Lewis explained "They accidentally knock over a barrel which has a fire burning inside it, and a caravan goes up in flames. The pair have no idea that Geoff and Claudia are in there, though." As the fire continued to engulf the caravan, Geoff realised that Claudia was succumbing to smoke inhalation. He helped get her out through a window, before collapsing and having to be rescued by Jai and Miles Copeland (Josh Quong Tart).

Lewis told Herbison that Geoff thought he was going to die and once he is safe, he can only think about Claudia. Once Geoff got to the hospital, he discovered that Claudia had lied about her previous relationship ending. He found Claudia talking to a guy he did not recognise and soon learned that he was her on-off boyfriend Lachie Cladwell (Jackson Heywood). Claudia had told Geoff that she and Lachie were broken up, but that was not the case. When Lachie realised who Geoff was, he punched him in the stomach and warned him to stay away from his girlfriend. Claudia later discovered that she was pregnant and she and Geoff were forced to consider their future. Due to Geoff's strict religious background, it was hard for him when everyone learnt that Claudia was expecting. Lewis explained "His sister, Annie, is disappointed, as Geoff's gone against what they were taught." Claudia's father was not supportive of the couple and he kicked his daughter out, which added to the pressure that Geoff was already feeling.

Belle Taylor (Jessica Tovey) allowed the couple to stay with her, while Geoff tried to keep the news a secret from his guardian Irene Roberts (Lynne McGranger). When Claudia admitted to Annie that she was thinking about having an abortion, Geoff was shocked as it went against his faith. Things got too much for Geoff and he went away for a couple of days to think about the situation. Of the pregnancy and Claudia and Geoff's relationship, series producer Cameron Welsh stated "It's not as clear cut as it probably looks on the surface. There's more going on there in their relationship and more than what we can probably see right now. It's an interesting story and will develop over the next couple of weeks." Lachie later tried to injure Geoff during a rugby match, but Geoff tackled Lachie hard, leaving him with no feeling in his legs. While they were at the hospital, Geoff and Claudia were "full of guilt" and Geoff tried to apologise to Lachie. Claudia then admitted to Geoff that the baby was not his, but Lachie's. A "furious" Geoff then ordered her to leave.

==== Ruby Buckton ====
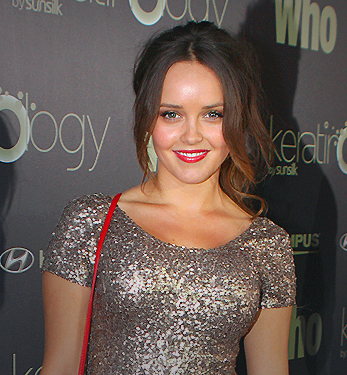
Rebecca Breeds played Ruby Buckton.

Geoff developed a romance with Ruby Buckton (Rebecca Breeds) just before his departure. Breeds said that there was "a lot of love between them" and that they had a beautiful relationship. She also said that while circumstances changed, their feelings did not. When Geoff and Ruby decided to get intimate, Ruby took the initiative to make it special between them. Breeds thought Geoff and Ruby were a great couple and commented that Geoff had a level of maturity that Ruby's ex-boyfriend did not have. She also enjoyed working with Lewis and believed that they had a good chemistry together. Lewis told TV Week's Carolyn Stewart that it took Geoff and Ruby about a year to work out what was going between them. He continued "I don't want to bring Twilight into it – and the vampire dude that I don't like! – but he can't be with the girl he loves and it kills him. That's what Geoff does to Ruby. He soon realises it doesn't help one little bit, but you'll have to watch to see exactly how everything happens!"

=== Departure ===
On 17 September 2009, it was announced that Lewis had quit Home and Away after two years. Of his exit, the actor stated "It's sad to be leaving the cast and crew on Home and Away. It was a hard decision to make, but I also think it's the right time to go." The actor filmed his final scenes as Geoff on 18 September. He later commented that fans could expect "a perfect exit" for his character, which would stay true to him. Geoff departed Summer Bay to "follow his dream" of becoming a missionary. In 2020, Lewis announced that he wanted to return to Home and Away and pitched a return story for Geoff to producers. However, they did not develop Lewis' idea further.

== Storylines ==
Geoff and his sister, Annie, find Martha MacKenzie (Jodi Gordon) sleeping in their barn and Geoff drives her back to Summer Bay. While they are at the Diner, Annie and Geoff meet Sally Fletcher (Kate Ritchie). Annie tells Sally that she and Geoff do not go to school and they work on the farm. When Geoff witnesses Lucas Holden (Rhys Wakefield) sinking a boat, he tells Lucas's father Tony (Jon Sivewright), causing them to become enemies. Bruce sends Geoff and Annie to school when their parents will is found and they learn money was set aside for their education. Geoff joins the local rugby league football team, where he clashes with both Lucas and Aden Jefferies, who believe Tony favours him. Aden spikes Geoff's drink and puts him in the boot of Tony's car. Geoff is rescued the next day and Bruce forces him to leave the team. Bruce kicks Geoff out when he learns that he poisoned the sheep. Geoff moves in with Tony and he rescues Annie, who goes to stay with Irene Roberts. Eventually the siblings are reconciled with Bruce, who even comes to watch Geoff's football match. Bruce later collapses and dies. His will asks Michael Abraham (James Mitchell) to become Geoff and Annie's legal guardian. However, when the farm is repossessed, Annie and Geoff move in with Irene.

Geoff is offered a football scholarship and he leaves the Bay. He returns when he learns Reverend Hall (Paul Tassone) has fallen ill and tells Annie that he does not want to play football anymore, he wants to be a Minister instead. Geoff develops a crush on a fellow student, but when he asks her to a bible class, she turns him down. Geoff then asks Melody Jones out and they begin dating. Nicole Franklin tries to cause problems by suggesting to Geoff that Melody did not like their first kiss. Melody's mother, Christine (Elizabeth Alexander), disapproves of the relationship and takes out a restraining order against Geoff, causing him to break up with Melody. Geoff becomes jealous when Nicole dates Elliot Gillen. He joins the couple on a dive boat and is suspicious when Nicole does not surface following a dive. Geoff and Elliot fight and Elliot shoots him in the leg with spear gun. Geoff and Nicole are washed up on an island and they have sex together, before they were rescued. Geoff feels guilty for having sex before marriage and proposes to Nicole, who turns him down. Their relationship starts to crumble and despite a romantic trip back to the island, they break up.

Martha buys the farm and hires Geoff's old school friend, Claudia Hammond, to help out. Geoff and Claudia have sex in a caravan, which later catches alight. Geoff rescues Claudia and at the hospital he is punched by her on-off boyfriend, Lachie. Claudia discovers she is pregnant and tells Geoff that he is the father. However, she later admits that Lachie is the father and leaves town. Aden asks Geoff to throw a football game, but Geoff refuses. He and Nicole later find Aden beaten up on the beach. Geoff is saddened when his friend, Belle Taylor, dies and he skips town with Ruby Buckton. He returns a week later and drops out of school to work on Irene's prawn trawler with Aden. Geoff and Aden fight after the trawler's engine overheats. When Aden nearly drowns, Geoff rescues him and they call a truce. Geoff develops feelings for Ruby and they begin dating. When a race riot breaks out, Geoff helps save people and fights the fires. Geoff is injured while protecting Ruby and he is left with permanent scarring. Geoff finds it hard to cope and breaks up with Ruby. He admits to Elijah Johnson (Jay Laga'aia) that he has lost his way, before realising that he wants to a take a job as a missionary overseas. After saying goodbye to Irene and Ruby, Geoff leaves for the city.

== Reception ==
For his portrayal of Geoff, Lewis won the Most Popular New Male Talent Logie Award in 2008. He also earned nominations for Best Newcomer and Sexiest Male at the Inside Soap Awards. A writer for Holy Soap named the character's most memorable moment as "evading psycho Derrek" who tried to kill him and Nicole. The writer also opined that "Hunky Geoff is loved by the ladies". A reporter for the Daily Record stated "Geoff is lovely but sometimes the sweetness pushes all the sense out of his brain and onto the floor with a big splat. When it comes to the fairer sex, it's not so much a splat as a landslide." The reporter thought Geoff had been "goggle-eyed" over Nicole and called him a "Bible-bashing blond". Another reporter for the paper said "There isn't a bad bone in Geoff but that doesn't stop him being on the receiving end of constant bad luck." Other reporters branded Geoff "hapless", "handsome" and "tactless".
