= Melody Jones =

- Home and Away character
- Portrayed by: Celeste Dodwell
- Duration: 2008–2009
- First appearance: 19 March 2008
- Last appearance: 26 February 2009
- Introduced by: Cameron Welsh
In-universe information
- Occupation: Student
- Father: Edward Jones
- Mother: Christine Jones
- Grandmothers: Audrey Long

Melody Jones is a fictional character from the Australian Channel Seven soap opera Home & Away, played by Celeste Dodwell. Dodwell originally auditioned for a separate part in the serial, but was offered the role of Melody instead. Dodwell said the part was a "dream come true". Melody is characterised as a shy student but has a "psychotic" side to her persona. Her main storyline arcs include a feud with her overprotective mother, Christine Jones (Liz Alexander) and a relationship with Geoff Campbell (Lincoln Lewis).

Melody is also admitted into a psychiatric clinic after Axel Hay (Trent Dalzell) assaults her and Christine tries to kidnap her. Dodwell said she carried out extensive research to help her portray the issue of mental health. She also found some of Melody's material challenging to play. In 2009, it was announced that Dodwell had decided to leave the serial and pursue further education overseas. Melody departed on-screen in February that year, which saw her move to New Zealand.

== Casting ==
In December 2007, it was announced that Celeste Dodwell had been cast as a "Summer Bay High student". Just three days earlier, Dodwell had finished her drama HSC and scored the highest mark in New South Wales. Dodwell originally auditioned for the role of Nicole Franklin, however Tessa James was cast in the role. Dodwell's agent later informed her about the "character breakdown" for Melody and she said that the part "intrigued" her. Dodwell was driving when her agent called her to let her know she had been offered the role. She said that she "accepted right away" and called it a "dream come true". The character was initially intended to be a guest role, but in June 2008 Tiffany Dunk of TV Week reported that Dodwell had been promoted to the main cast. Dunk confirmed that Dodwell would "disappear" for a while, before returning with a "huge" storyline that would play out until the end of the year.

== Development ==
Melody is characterised as "kind, shy and loyal" but has a "psychotic" side. Dodwell said that playing Melody, the "more intellectual and timid side of human nature, is really rewarding."

In one storyline Melody is sexually assaulted by Axel Hay (Trent Dalzell). Dodwell said from an actor's perspective, it was "a tough journey to go on" because Melody's scenes are "demanding". As a result, Melody has a "big breakdown", Dodwell said she had to delve deep into her character's psychology and admitted it was a harsh experience. To research the plot Dodwell gained inspiration from watching the film Girl, Interrupted and visiting a psychiatric clinic. The "very dark and solemn" atmosphere in within the two helped Dodwell with the psychological build up in Melody. When is admitted into a psychiatric clinic, where Aden Jefferies (Todd Lasance) is also being treated. While Axel is killed by Larry Jefferies (Paul Gleeson). Lasance said that Aden had been "protective of Melody after Axel took advantage of her". The pair share an "unspoken bond" because of their past experiences and he "understands exactly what she's going through." While he tries to help her, "Melody thinks she is evil" because she prayed for Axel to die. Aden's help "brings her back down to earth". Melody has hallucinations of Axel trying to attack her again, Dodwell said it was a "toiling situation" to get herself into Melody's frame of mind. Melody's interfering mother Christine Jones (Liz Alexander) has Melody discharged from the clinic. This worsens Melody's condition because she believes Axel will get her. She thinks Geoff doesn't know what he wants, and that she's right for him, so she's trying to make him see that. She doesn't realise how far she's taking it. She goes psycho!"

When she begins to recover, Melody decides she wants to rekindle her relationship with Geoff Campbell (Lincoln Lewis), however, Geoff has moved on with Nicole Franklin (Tessa James). Dodwell said Melody is "almost psychotic" in her attempts to win him back. She had previously happy while with Geoff, so "she's obsessed with having that happiness again". When Melody finds out about Nicole, her "heart breaks, it shatter into a thousand little pieces" and she thinks she will become "unstuck" again because she still feels "unstable". Dodwell said Melody should have given up at that point, but Melody thinks through "determination" she can win him back. Dodwell also had members of the public approaching her and recommending that Melody seeks professional help.

Series producer Cameron Welsh said Melody's journey is "interesting" because "it gets worse before it gets better" for her. He said she had been a "fascinating character" for the production team to develop, because she is the opposite to traditional Home and Away characters with problems. Melody started out as "well and has gone bad", whereas "most characters start out a lot of issues, then time in Summer Bay reforms them." Melody is later taken in by Miles Copeland (Josh Quong Tart). Melody's behaviour becomes a problem when she goes on a "downward spiral" and develops an attitude problem. She later runs away to Melbourne, believing that everyone else will be better off without her. In the storyline Miles and Charlie Buckton (Esther Anderson) travel to Melbourne to search for Melody. The episodes marked the first time the cast had filmed in Melbourne. Location shoots took place at Queen Victoria Market, Docklands Studios Melbourne and on St Kilda Road. Anderson told Inside Soap that "It's a nice self-contained little storyline" and described it as a treat for British and Irish viewers. She added that Melody ends up on the streets and Charlie and Miles fail to locate her straightaway, which leads her into trouble."

In 2009, TV Week reported that Dodwell had decided to quit the serial in order to attend drama school in the United Kingdom. In the build up to Melody's exit, she finally meets her grandmother Audrey Long (Wendy Playfair), who caused her mother Christine's bitter outlook on life. When Audrey reveals her "true colours" to Melody, she makes the decision to go and live in New Zealand.

== Storylines ==
Annie Campbell (Charlotte Best) arranges to set Melody up on a date with her brother, Geoff. Melody and Geoff get along but she is hurt when she overhears him telling Annie she is not as pretty as other girls. She ignores Geoff's apologies at first but accepts them in the end. They eventually begin dating but Melody worries that her mother, Christine will not approve. Christine finds out and tries to split them up. Melody finds herself at odds with Christine over Spring Awakening when she reads a copy of the play intended for the senior half of the school. After Christine causes consternation over the book at a Parents and Carers meeting, Melody is left horrified and snaps at her mother when she begins chastising her teach Miles. She is then enrolled at a Catholic College in Yabbie Creek much to her to horror. Things are made worse when Christine takes out an AVO against Geoff to prevent him from seeing Melody.

Nicole Franklin throws a party while her father, Roman Harris (Conrad Coleby) is away and Melody attends in order to see Geoff, who is reluctant due to his order. He later ends the relationship and leaves her distraught. Melody hides in Nicole's room and Axel Hay finds her. Axel attempts to rape her but she is able to fight him off. She runs home to find Christine waiting and does not disclose the events of the night. After a visit from Axel, Melody breaks down and confesses the truth to Christine. She is then hospitalized.

Melody is next seen in the same clinic as Aden Jefferies. She begins seeing visions of Axel, despite him dying in a motorcycle accident. She is later discharged and horrified when she learns Geoff is now with Nicole and schemes to win him back. Melody tries to seduce Geoff at a Halloween party by kissing him which Nicole witnesses. Nicole, angry reveals that she had slept with Geoff, leaving Melody saddened.

Melody then goes through an identity crisis and works on a new look which impresses troublemaker Matthew Lyons (Ross Pirelli). She begins hanging around with Matthew and falls into bad ways and they both get high on Marijuana. On the day of the formal, Melody sneaks out despite being grounded by Miles. After another Marijuana episode, Melody freaks out and leaves. Annie, Jai Fernandez (Jordan Rodrigues) and Kane Phillips (Sam Atwell) look for her. Kane swerves to avoid Melody who is seen walking in the middle of the road and crashes into the building where the formal is held. A fire starts and escape is almost impossible due to Melody locking the door. Eventually, she admits her behaviour to Miles and Bartlett tells her she is no longer welcome at school.

Melody, ashamed and distraught, packs up her belongings and heads to Melbourne where she stays in a shelter overnight. When she wakes up, she realises her bag containing her clothing and cash has been stolen. Melody then tries her luck on the street and meets Archie Maddock (Tim Phillips) who befriends her and offers her some food but she kinds refuses it. She then finds herself in a confrontation with a girl named Kayla who has stolen her clothes. Archie saves her and they begin spending time with each other. They become involved in a wallet snatching scenario with a local gang, who eventually catch Archie and beat him up. Miles and Charlie Buckton find Archie who tells them Melody is safe but is not with him. Miles thanks Archie and gives him some money. Miles finds Melody at a local Cathedral and convinces Melody to return home. Christine reappears in Melody's life and tries to get her to come back home. Christine makes an offer for Melody to join her and her grandmother, Audrey Long in New Zealand. Audrey later dies after suffering a stroke. Melody then realises Christine has changed for the better and decides to give her a second chance, leaving with her.

== Reception ==
A columnist for British newspaper Metro opined that the "wayward teenager" had "led guardian Miles a merry dance" and caused "chaos" with her antics. A writer from The New Zealand Herald said that Melody became "Summer Bay's most troublesome teen".
