= Lisa Duffy =

Lisa Duffy may refer to:

- Lisa Duffy (politician), British politician
- Lisa Duffy (Home and Away), a recurring character in the Australian soap opera Home and Away

== See also ==
- Lisa Duffin, fictional character from British TV series Casualty played by Cathy Shipton, and nicknamed Duffy
