= Nicole Franklin =

Fictional character in Home and Away

- Home and Away character
- Portrayed by: Tessa James
- Duration: 2008–2011
- First appearance: 18 April 2008
- Last appearance: 21 June 2011
- Introduced by: Cameron Welsh
In-universe information
- Occupation: Student at Summer Bay High (2008–2010); Student at Yabbie Creek University (2011)
- Father: Roman Harris
- Mother: Natalie Franklin
- Stepfather: Roy
- Half-sisters: Lindsay MacKenzie-Harris
- Sons: George Franklin

Nicole Franklin is a fictional character from the Australian Channel Seven soap opera Home and Away, played by Tessa James. She debuted on-screen during the episode airing on 18 April 2008. Nicole was introduced by executive producer Cameron Welsh. Nicole was mentioned various times before appearing on-screen, James was cast in the role and described by Welsh as an "exciting talent". He predicted that the viewers would respond "really well" to her. Nicole was initially portrayed as a shallow "party girl" with "wild ways". Also described as a "high maintenance" female, she has been shown to dress constantly in a stylish manner. Nicole is also become notable for her many relationships. Her first prominent romance was with Geoff Campbell. Described as "complete opposites", Geoff is credited as a catalyst in Nicole mellowing her brash attitude. Their storyline allowed the actors to take part in one of the serial's "biggest ever location shoots", when the couple became stranded on a remote desert island. In one storyline Nicole was involved in a same sex kiss with fellow character Freya Duric, which was branded controversial by various media sources. The plot saw Nicole question her persona, believing Geoff had transformed her into a boring person.

Another relationship Nicole pursued was with Aden Jefferies, her longtime closest friend. Aden had a strong fanbase from his previous relationship with Belle Taylor. This resulted in the audience being divided over their relationship. Nicole has also been featured in various other romantic storylines, such as a brief fling with Liam Murphy, James said that he was compatible with Nicole because he had "the edge she was after". She also dated Trey Palmer and they became involved in sex tape storyline, many newspapers reported on the plot because it "echoed" co-star Lewis' real life sex tape scandal. Producer Welsh once stated he believed Nicole was destined to become "full circle" and Nicole began behaving erratic and wild once more, due to her failed romances and the death of her friend Belle. She also had an affair with an older male character, Sid Walker. James liked the fact Nicole had so many romances because she got to kiss many of her co-stars.

James announced her departure from Home and Away in March 2011. One of her final storylines was a pregnancy plot. Nicole felt she was too young and unable to offer a child stability, so she agreed to let Marilyn Chambers adopt the baby upon its birth. James and the writing team took the storyline "very seriously" and conducted research to portray the issue sensitively. Nicole has received critical analysis from various sources, with perception being mixed to positive. TV Week were neutral to aspects of her pregnancy plot but opined James was one of the serial's best actresses. The Daily Record said that being single was good for the character. She has also been likened to celebrities because of her glamorous image.

== Creation and casting ==
Nicole is Roman Harris' (Conrad Coleby) daughter and she was often mentioned on-screen before producers decided to introduce her into the serial. In January 2008 it was announced that ex-Neighbours star Tessa James had been cast as Nicole. Executive producer Cameron Welsh said "She is an exciting talent and I think audiences are going to love her character and respond really well to her." James then moved to Sydney especially for the role. Speaking of working on the serial James stated: "Working on a series like this [Home and Away] is the best training you can get, I look at it like an apprenticeship and never forget how lucky I am." Fellow cast member Celeste Dodwell who plays Melody Jones originally auditioned for the part of Nicole. After Coleby who plays Roman quit the serial, James' time with the show was in doubt.

In March 2011, James confirmed that she had left Home and Away. She has already filmed her final scenes and Nicole will leave on-screen later in the year. Of her departure, James said "I was at Home and Away for three-and-a-half-years, so it's good to be finished and get to be who I am, and do what I've wanted to do for so long."

== Character development ==
=== Characterisation ===
Nicole has been portrayed as a party girl, feisty and has had many boyfriends in a short space of time. James has described Nicole stating: "I love playing Nicole because she's feisty and fun, and doesn't mind pushing the boundaries. And she dresses stylishly – she's very high maintenance, which is fun to play." The serial's official website describes her as: "Nicole might come off as a bitchy princess to some people, she's not malicious. She's simply as shallow as a puddle, and while she might cause others emotional pain, it's totally unintentional." They also state: "Nicole is a girl who lives to have fun, and she is fun if you accept her for who she is. And, of course, she thinks you're worth her attention. Nicole is a girl who knows exactly who she is and where she stands: at the centre of the universe." Soap opera reporting website Holy Soap described Nicole as "a label-loving pampered princess, armed with a sharp wardrobe and an even sharper tongue". They also added she was a "sultry" type character.

Whilst interviewed by The Daily Telegraph, James stated: "I think she's the best character, I get to have so much fun being a princess and a prima donna. She doesn't mind pushing the boundaries. She's very high maintenance, which is fun to play." She also stated she enjoys Nicole's "promiscuous side" because she seems to have another boyfriend every week. James also enjoys the role because of this and the fact she gets so many "pash" scenes with other cast members.

Series producer Cameron Welsh branded Nicole as an "interesting character", adding his opinion on her development stating: "She came in with really strong opinions and a kind of morality that was different to the rest of the group". Welsh also believes that Nicole is destined to come "full circle". Of her 2010 storylines he comments that Nicole's poor judgements make her realise and re-evaluate her life.

=== Relationship with Geoff Campbell ===
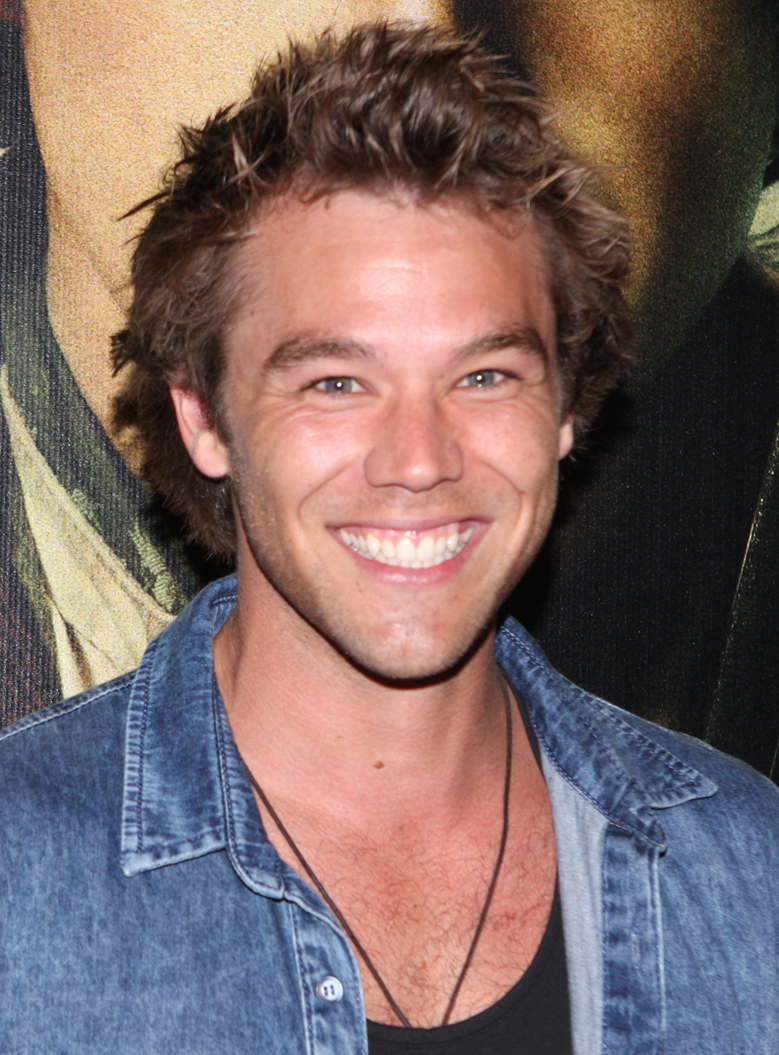
Lewis (pictured) plays Nicole's love interest Geoff Campbell.

Nicole embarks on a relationship with Geoff Campbell, not before they are embroiled in a "sordid love triangle" along with Melody. In one storyline Nicole and Geoff became stranded on a "deserted island" and nearly die. The episodes were filmed on Box Beach located at Shoal Bay, New South Wales as part of a two-day location shoot. Nicole nearly drowns in scenes which aired for the serial's "cliff-hanger" in 2008. James and Lewis took scuba diving lessons in preparation for the storyline. Filming the storyline was compromised by logistical challenges. The crew had to move camera equipment between boats and the crew walked around the perimeters of the beach in order to avoid leaving footprints. This was to keep the authenticity of a deserted location. The storyline was also given a "big budget", featured helicopters and a number of promotional adverts were aired on Seven.

The storyline began on-screen when Nicole started dating Elliot Gillen (Paul Pantano). He had a vendetta against Roman and kidnapped Nicole and Geoff and left them stranded out at sea. They washed up on a deserted island and were forced to survive without food and clothing. Describing the effect it had on Nicole and Geoff, James stated: "They have no food, shelter or clothing. [...] They find moments to make each other laugh, though, and realise how much they mean to one another." Geoff had strong religious views and did not believe in premarital sex. However, the environment they were in caused him to let his guard down and they slept together. Lewis told TV Week that all the pair could think of whilst trapped was being rescued and their feelings for one another. He added that "the fact they were both pretty much naked didn't help". He concluded the fact they were both kids, trying to keep warm - that then "stuff happens". Geoff was left "guilt-ridden" because he gave into temptation. He did not regret it, but acknowledged that he wanted to save his virginity until marriage. Therefore, Geoff saw no other option but to propose to Nicole. Lewis stated, "He's not 100% sure about that either, but he feels that if they're going to have sex, a wedding is the only solution." Describing Nicole's reaction he said that she was "dumbfounded" by his offer, as she had believed he was acting strange because he wanted to dump her. Nicole refused when she realised his reasons for proposing. According to James, the moment managed to ruin their passion. She also commented that: "Nicole has liked Geoff for ages and was so happy to have got together with him - but now he's spoiled it." James also admitted she was thrilled to learn Nicole would turn down his proposal. James later opined that Nicole was "the one" for Geoff, but did not believe that Geoff was "the one" for Nicole.

"Their relationship's been rocky and they've been fighting a lot lately, so Nicole decides to organise a trip to where they first got intimate. The island was a place where nothing stood in the way of their true feelings, so she hopes that going back will wash away all the bad stuff that's been happening between them lately."

— James on what the island means to Nicole and Geoff. (2009)

Nicole and Geoff's relationship became strained. Nicole decided to plan a return trip to the island, believing it would solve their problems and bring them closer together. James said that Geoff loved the surprise, but found Nicole "very sexy and tempting". She added that everything about Nicole forced Geoff to question his religious beliefs and he felt he "needed to back away". Their trip soon turned disastrous when a man named Derrick Quaid (John Atkinson) stole their food and intimidated the couple. He admitted he was a murderer and tried to attack Geoff with a knife. James said he "put himself in harm's way" to save Nicole.

In 2009, James told Inside Soap that Nicole and Geoff had a strong friendship underneath their romance. She also described their compatibility stating: "They're complete opposites, which works well for them. It's a bit of a fiery relationship, and they've been through a lot together." Whilst Lewis added: "They're also very similar in some of their strongest traits. Geoff and Nicole are both stubborn and opinionated, and in some ways they're naive. In a weird way they show a side to each other nobody else gets to see." James opined Nicole's wild behaviour was often too much for Geoff to cope with. In public, Lewis initially had negative feedback from older viewers because they felt Geoff was better suited to Melody. He revealed they felt like she was a bad influence for Geoff because she often played games. However towards the end of their relationship he felt perception had changed due to viewers having a better understanding of Nicole's persona.

=== Other relationships ===
In 2009, the serial embarked on two lesbian storylines, one of which involved Nicole. It featured Freya Duric (Sophie Hensser) kissing Nicole, which sparked complaints. However, for Nicole it wasn't about sexuality, rather finding herself the center of attention. James described their dynamic, stating: "Freya's exactly what Nicole was like when she first arrived in the bay, that is why they click. Nicole relates to the wild side of Freya, but has no idea how far Freya is going to take it." Through her relationship with Geoff she had mellowed, however her vanity was still present. James said Nicole was "angry" because she was on Freya's "not hot list". Freya kissed her to prove she thinks she is hot, James opined that Nicole did not enjoy the kiss, but was just "happy to be center of attention" and happy that people were talking about her again. The incident eventually brought her to the realisation that she had become boring. Nicole denied it was to do with her involvement with Geoff, however James said Geoff was the reason she became bored.

Later that year the serial included a storyline which was branded "bizarre" after it mirrored a real life scandal that had occurred weeks earlier. Lewis who plays love interest Geoff had been caught up in a sex tape scandal which leaked onto the internet; the serial decided to include Nicole making a sex tape with Trey Palmer (Luke Bracey) and having it leaked. Trey filmed without Nicole's consent, when she found out the truth she ended their relationship. Trey thought she and Geoff were getting back together so aired the tape at a local film festival to gain revenge. James described Nicole's state of mind adding, "she's quite vulnerable at the moment, with her dad, Roman, in prison. She's relying on Trey, so this is the last thing she needs." The show also defended their decision to broadcast the storyline because it was realistic. A publicist stated "like all successful dramas, Home And Away tackles many issues, and this is one of them."

Nicole's best friend during her initial storylines was Aden Jefferies (Todd Lasance). After Brendan Austin (Kain O'Keeffe) caused Roman to go blind, he took his anger out on Nicole and Aden. Subsequently, they became "each other's support network" and Lasance said it was not long afterward that they "slipped between the sheets". One of the conditions of Aden's tenancy was to never sleep with Nicole, so this made the pair feel guilty that they had deceived Roman. Lasance felt the storyline was controversial as he had a strong fan base for his relationship with Belle Taylor (Jessica Tovey) - which meant he knew it would "cause a stir" and divide the audience. In January 2010, Nicole and Aden "get up close and personal" and they decided to spend Aden's remaining time in the Bay together. They shared a kiss and James told TV Week that there are "a lot of complications" for them. She said that no one knew what was going to happen with Liam Murphy (Axle Whitehead) and that Nicole felt guilty for betraying Belle because she was her friend. James explained that Nicole's pairing with Aden was "a bit more serious and in-depth than her usual relationships." James opined that Aden was the "nicer guy" for Nicole, but Liam may have had "the edge she's after." Nicole and Aden then embarked on a relationship. James thought that Nicole and Aden's relationship was great and said "They started out having a kind of brother-sister relationship, and that developed into something more." Nicole declared her love for Aden, however he did not reciprocate. Lasance described the moment whilst interviewed by TV Week stating: "They've always had an awesome connection and Nicole gets into a bit of a comfortable state and blurts out that she loves Aden." Aden appreciated her love for him, however cannot say it back until he felt the same way. It is this that made their relationship "awkward"; Nicole tried to withdraw her declaration and hide her hurt feelings.

=== Downward spiral ===
"Nicole drinks too much and becomes really irresponsible, she thinks that alcohol is solving all her problems but it is not [...] Nicole has always had a wild side, and she's making bad decisions at the moment. That will continue while she tries to sort herself out."

— James on Nicole's re-found rebellious nature (2009)

In mid-2009, producers decided to take Nicole's storyline into a "u-turn", when she reverted to her "wild ways". At the time Nicole had endured repetitive personal trauma including failed relationships, Roman being sent to prison and her best friend Belle was dying of cancer. James explained: "It's all too much for her and she can't handle it, so she reverts to her wild ways." Geoff notices Nicole's erratic behaviour and attempts to help her. She tried to "lure him into bed" after he comforted her, however he turned her down. James said she no longer had romantic feelings for Geoff, but was actually in a "vulnerable state". She then started relying on alcohol more, and partied with fellow "wild child" Indigo Walker (Samara Weaving) at a "rowdy" venue. James explained that Nicole saw alcohol as an answer to her problems. The fact that "she's trying to deal with too many things" saw Nicole transform into a messed up and depressed person.

Nicole became more irresponsible the more she drank and was in the company of many men. Geoff arrived and saved her from danger, Lewis said there was a part of Geoff that still loved Nicole. However they did not start anything again, James said she understood why because of their complicated backstory. However Geoff continued to support Nicole as he realised that "a lot of people she was closest to have deserted her". Nicole's unpredictable behaviour continued thereafter. All that Geoff could offer was to be there for her because ultimately "Nicole is the only one that can save her from herself."

=== Pregnancy ===
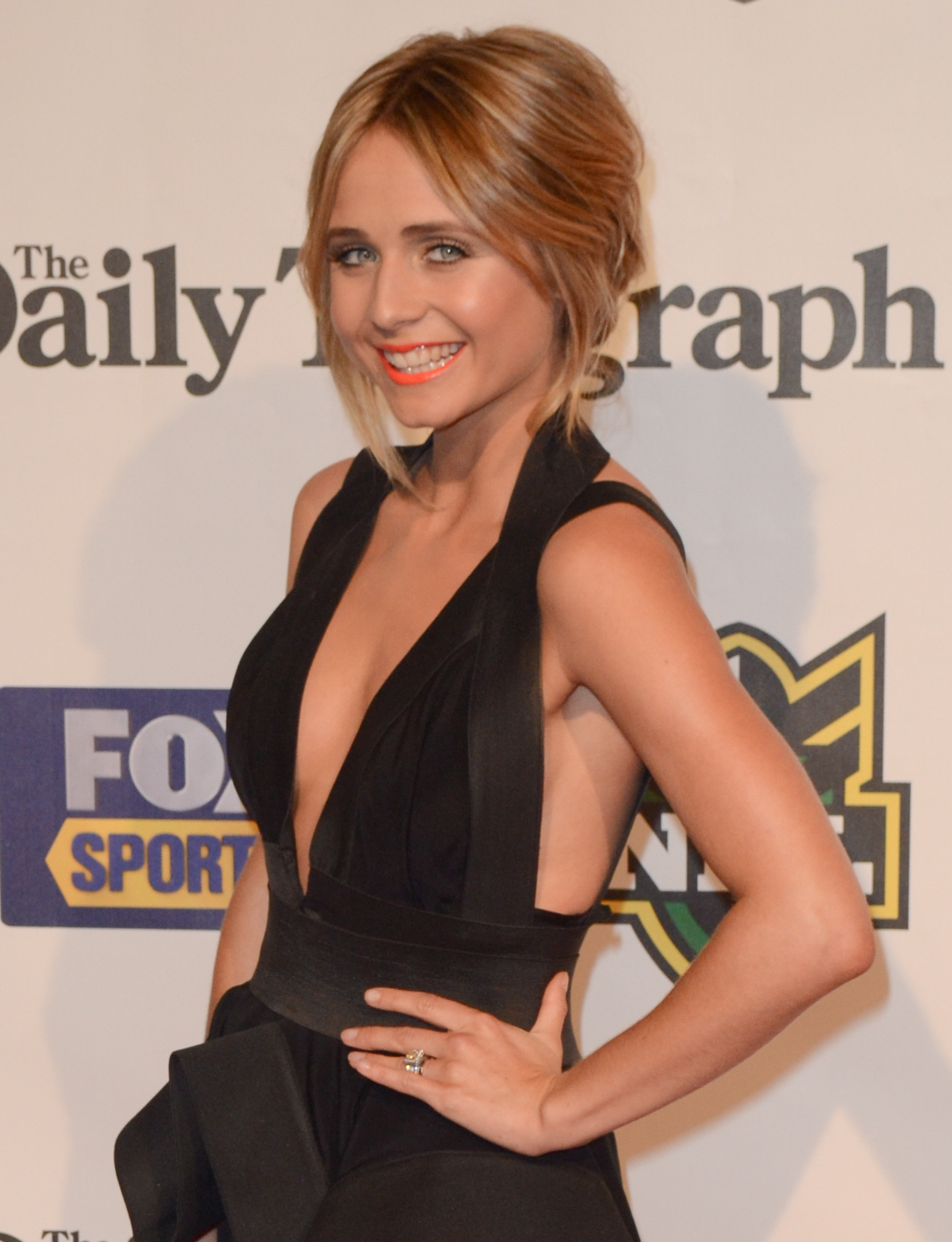
Tessa James (pictured) did not want Nicole to feature in a pregnancy storyline.

Nicole had a brief relationship with Penn Graham (Christian Clark) and after he was murdered, she discovered that she was pregnant with his child. James told Sunrise that viewers could expect a "realistic portrayal of teen pregnancy" and she explained that it was important to respect the issue. She added "We took it very seriously with the writers, and you do a lot of research and things like that. You can only do your best, I guess!" Nicole later told Marilyn Chambers (Emily Symons) about the baby and she offered to adopt it. James later revealed that when she joined Home and Away she told the writers that they can do anything with her character, except make her pregnant. Of the moment she was told that Nicole was going to have a baby, James said "I went in to see our producer later and he said, 'Okay, I'm going to apologise in advance - we're making Nicole pregnant!'" She initially did not want to portray a "typical soap teenage pregnancy" as she thought Nicole should be different. However the situation was explained to her and she became excited at the challenging storyline ahead.

Nicole later decided to let Marilyn and Sid Walker (Robert Mammone) adopt the baby upon its birth. Marilyn was desperate to mother a child and her obsession with that and her controlling behaviour became too much for Nicole. Of the situation, Symons said "Marilyn is in Nicole's face every minute. She's doing it out of love, but she doesn't realise she's becoming obsessed with the baby." Nicole was still questioning whether she is making the right decision about her unborn baby's future and she argued with Marilyn. Nicole began dating a student from university, Angus McCathie (Tim Pocock), they got along well on their first dates. Marilyn was left worried about their agreement and she felt "distanced." Symons explained, "Marilyn is scared of being replaced. She's scared of losing the baby, which could happen because there isn't a legal agreement." Roo Stewart (Georgie Parker) helped Nicole by convincing Marilyn to re-evaluate the situation. Symons added that there is "still a long way to go" with the arrangement, but thereafter she was supportive and offered constructive help to Nicole.

During the final few weeks of her pregnancy Nicole began to receive increasing support from Angelo Rosetta (Luke Jacobz). James said it was clear to see that "the lines of friendship could be blurring into something more" for the pair. Whilst Jacobz opined "They've been spending time together and have realised how comfortable they are together."

Angelo was forced to help Nicole give birth to a baby boy, George, and she handed him over to Marilyn immediately as agreed. She then tried to stay away, however it became obvious he needed her when he struggled without her. Marilyn then became obsessed with Nicole having the power to take her new son back. It was then revealed that Nicole would struggle to switch off her mothering instinct after giving George away. Nicole came to visit the baby and Marilyn caught her breastfeeding George, while she was alone with him. Symons called the scenes "volatile." Nicole was unaware that Marilyn has reservations about her spending time with the baby. Of the breastfeeding scene, Symons stated: "Marilyn is shocked and offended, and this cuts to the very core of her worries - that she doesn't have the same natural mothering instincts as George's birth mother. Without a doubt, Marilyn thinks Nicole is overstepping the mark. She feels that a boundary has been overstepped and it could put a big strain on their relationship." After the incident, Marilyn asked Nicole to stay away from the baby. James defended Nicole stating: "I think it's hard to not bond, but this is Marilyn's baby, and Nicole is so young and wants very much to give Marilyn and Sid this gift."

== Storylines ==
Nicole's biological parents were the teenage Roman Harris (Conrad Coleby) and Natalie Franklin (Adrienne Pickering), but she was raised by her maternal grandparents and considered her mother, Natalie, as an older sister. She did not meet her father until her early teenage years. Nicole arrives in Summer Bay in a flashy car. She initially makes herself unpopular with her bitchy care-free nature. She tries to sleep with Aden but he rebuffs her. She makes a bet with Aden that she can sleep with Geoff Campbell (Lincoln Lewis) within two weeks, but Geoff and Belle publicly humiliate her when they find out. Nicole starts dating Roman's old SAS friend Mark's brother Elliot Gillen, despite Roman's disapproval. After breaking up with Elliot, he takes her diving where he tries to kill her, Geoff and later Roman. Geoff tries to save Nicole, but Elliot leaves the pair stranded at sea. They wash up on a remote island and Geoff and Nicole grow close to each other. Geoff, who has strong religious views, sleeps with Nicole as they cannot fight temptation. When rescued Geoff proposes to Nicole out of guilt, she turns him down. She later has a pregnancy scare but is happy to discover it was a false alarm. Nicole later decides she and Geoff should return to the island to repair their relationship. They are chased through woodland by a murderer, Derrick who tries to kill them both. However they manage to escape. Nicole decides to try her best to make their relationship work. However, after Freya kisses her they enter a few rocky periods and later break up.

She starts a relationship with troublesome Trey. He films them having sex, which is later leaked at the town's movie festival. She has a brief relationship with Liam. After the death of good friend Belle, Nicole goes on a downward spiral. She starts partying and binge drinking along with Indigo. Geoff notices her behaviour and attempts to help her. After pushing him away she sleeps with drug addict Liam. She then pursues older man Sid. She kisses him and Indigo sees them, which ruins their friendship. She later moves in with Miles Copeland (Josh Quong Tart) who agrees to look after her.

Nicole starts dating Penn who manipulates her. He makes her believe she has accidentally stepped on a needle and she has tests for HIV. She later finds out she has the all clear. Nicole reveals to Marilyn that she is pregnant with Penn's child. She initially chooses to have an abortion, but changes her mind and decides to give the baby to Marilyn. Nicole goes on a date with Angelo and she takes him to her antenatal class. When he learns that Nicole is giving her baby away, Angelo ends their relationship. Nicole becomes friends with Roo and asks her to be at the birth, but Roo turns her down. Marilyn apologises to Nicole when she starts to take over and begins leaving her out of her plans for the baby. Nicole becomes fed up when the baby is late and Angelo tries to help her start labour. They go for a walk on the beach and Nicole's water breaks. Angelo is then forced to deliver the baby. Nicole later decides that she wants her baby back and tells Marilyn, who is devastated. Marilyn takes the baby, but later returns him. Nicole then leaves Summer Bay with Angelo and George. She later contacts Marilyn and they meet in the city. Nicole and Marilyn talk things through and Angelo shows up with George.

When Angelo returns to the Bay in 2020, it was revealed that he and Nicole are no longer together.

== Reception ==
Holy Soap said that Nicole's most memorable moment was when she "returned to the desert island with Geoff to rekindle their love" and she was held hostage by Derek the murderer, before her father came to the rescue. Inside Soap opined that Nicole was a "flighty minx from the city who prays at the altar of Paris Hilton". The Sunday Mail said it seemed like no one could stop her downward spiral. The Daily Record said that Nicole and Geoff's relationship ending was good for her character. They later branded her a "fiery favourite" and when she started dating Penn, they said "Impressionable Nicole looks set to fall for the wrong man all over again". When Nicole had her HIV scare Holy Soap said "As if defending her man against the Bay's critics wasn't enough for one girl to take, poor Nic". Inside Soap said "Nicole Franklin isn't exactly backward in coming forward". TV Week chose James as one of the serial's most promising actresses opining she was ready for roles in Hollywood.

TV Week often commented on her pregnancy storyline. After the plot was halfway through Erin Miller of TV Week said that Nicole had changed her mind about adopting her baby "more times that Julia Gillard has uttered the phrase 'moving forward'". Upon watching Nicole's beach birth scenes, the magazine website editor quipped "Who knew sand had birthing properties?! Well, maybe not... but you could forgive pregnant teen Nicole for thinking that after a casual stroll along the Bay's beach ends with Angelo delivering her newborn son!" Commenting on the realism of the storyline they added: "Only in the Bay would a baby be born on the beach!" Miller thought it was odd she had then "miraculously lost any signs that she even had a baby." She quipped "already the teen is back to wearing skin-tight dresses!". They later described Nicole and Marilyn's argument over George as "the mother of all rifts" and said "It's exhausting just thinking about it!" Miller later criticised Nicole's career in fashion, after John told her he hated her designs for the Surf Club. She said "I had to agree with him - putting lifesavers in pink polo-neck swimmers is a terrible idea."
