= Aaron Copeland =

Aaron Copeland may refer to:

- Aaron Copland (1900–1990), American composer, composition teacher, writer, and conductor
- Aaron Copeland (Home and Away), a fictional character in the TV series
