= Breaking Through (2015 film) =

- Directed by: John Swetnam
- Screenplay by: John Swetnam
- Produced by: Luis Fragali; Fabio Golombek; Mike Jackson; Uri Singer; John Swetnam
- Starring: Sophia Aguiar; Robert Roldan; Bruna Marquezine; Jordan Rodrigues
- Release date: August 19, 2015
- Running time: 90 minutes
- Countries: United States; United Kingdom
- Language: English

Breaking Through (also known as Breaking Dance in Europe) is a 2015 American-English dance drama film written and directed by John Swetnam and starring Sophia Aguiar.

== Plot ==
Casey is an dancer who creates a Youtube channel to publish dancing videos and tutorials, becoming a big hit in a short time. The girl is introduced in the rich and famous world, but fame comes at a price and she will no longer be able to trust her own friends, like the jealous Roseli.

== Cast ==
- Sophia Aguiar as Casey McNamara
- Robert Roldan as Drew
- Bruna Marquezine as Roseli
- Jordan Rodrigues as J.J.
- Julie Warner as Anna
- Shaun Brown as Phillip
- Les Twins as Larry and Laurent Jordan
- Lindsey Stirling as Phelba
- Taeko McCarroll as Michelle
- Jay Ellis as Quinn
- Taylor Locascio as Megan
- McCarrie McCausland as Nick
- Marissa Heart as Tara
- Marcus Emanuel Mitchell as Bryson Chase
- Anitta as Herself

== Reception ==
Breaking Through received mostly negative reviews. Justin Lowe of The Hollywood Reporter called it derivative. Tat Wolfen from Saturday Star wrote that it was "yet another dance movie that has nothing new to offer". Katie Walsh of the Los Angeles Times called it "a dance movie without good dancing". Monica Castillo writing in The Village Voice said it was "convoluted drama" and had " tepid routines". David Noh of Film Journal International thought it "could well rank as the blandest movie musical ever made." Mike McCahill gave it 1 star in the Guardian and says "The routines Swetnam commits to film are framed with zero flair; more thought has gone into prominently positioning one YouTube channel’s logos, and crowbarring talk of branding, shingles and cross-promotional traffic between glib platitudes and awkward burps of exposition." On the positive side Sandie Angulo Chen of Common Sense Media gave it three stars, saying the story was "both familiar and heartwarming".
