= Jazz Curtis =

- Home and Away character
- Portrayed by: Rachel Gordon
- Duration: 2007–2008
- First appearance: 18 June 2007
- Last appearance: 21 May 2008
- Introduced by: Julie McGauran
In-universe information
- Other names: Jacinta Curtis
- Occupation: Secretary
- Husband: Kevin Freeman
- Sons: Drew Curtis
- Stepdaughters: Bree Freeman; Essie Freeman

Jacinta "Jazz" Curtis is a fictional character from the Australian television soap opera Home and Away, played by Rachel Gordon. The character made her first screen appearance on 18 June 2007. Jazz is introduced as the mother of established character Drew Curtis (Bobby Morley). Jazz made her final appearance on 21 May 2008.

== Character development ==
=== Characterisation ===
Jazz is a tall, slim, brunette with a penchant for the boys and a moral code the size of a peanut. She is Drew's tear away mother whom he has never been able to trust. Her motivations are skewed, her intentions questionable and her past debatable. She's back in town with nothing to lose, and possibly a man to gain. She's trouble with a capital T.

— An excerpt taken from the official Home and Away website.

Gordon "really enjoyed" the opportunity to play Jazz, a role she called "a lot of fun and very glamorous because the role’s shiny on the outside but gritty underneath." Jazz is very feminine and likes fashion and high heel shoes. Gordon told a reporter from Yahoo! 7 that "it's good to play a character that’s feminine and has a bit of fun."

Jazz has a complex persona and writers played her as the show's "super-bitch" who wants to do the right thing but wreaks havoc in the process. Gordon believed that Jazz made an effort to change her ways as her time in the show progressed. She added "I really like Jazz, initially she was just a full on bitch but over a period of time, a lot more complexity has evolved in her and it’s interesting to play a character that's trying to do the right thing but always, kind of, getting it really wrong, it’s been fun.” On the show's official website Jazz has been described as having weak morals and a trouble maker. Gordon told a reporter from Inside Soap that she liked the role because Jazz is a "strong woman" who can be "bitchy" but also has a "vulnerable side".

=== Relationships ===
Jazz is introduced as the mother of established character Drew Curtis (Bobby Morley). Gordon found it "suitably humbling" when she discovered that she had secured "the role of a mother to a guy in his 20s." Despite the actors being close in age, Gordon believed it worked well on-screen. She added "it actually really works for the character that I’m playing, although the mother-son relationship is reversed. He’s more the parent and she’s the irresponsible one. They’re more like buddies than mother and son."

Jazz has not been a good mother to Drew and has often failed to support him. Gordon believed that "Jazz doesn’t really have many good qualities as a mother." She explained that it is important to be loving and consistent to children, but Jazz would often fail to be that type of mother. She concluded that "Jazz is very inconsistent with her behaviour towards Drew. And to make kids feel valued is important." When Jazz arrives in Summer Bay, it becomes apparent that Jazz is hiding a secret about Drew's friend Jules Munroe (Joel Phillips). She uses their secret to exert power over him. Jazz claims to be visiting after Dan Baker (Tim Campbell) informs her that Drew has quit school. It soon becomes apparent that Jazz has actually broken-up with her partner and is running away. Morely told an Inside Soap reporter that Jazz had been absent from Drew's life for five years and is apprehensive about reconnecting with her. He explained that "he's never got along with Jazz, and he doesn't want the past being raked over yet again." Her presence makes Drew suspicious of Jazz's true intentions and believes she has an ulterior motive for visiting him. Morely described a difficult relationship between the two characters. He branded Jazz "a cold, selfish socialite" who is a "negative influence" on Drew. Jazz has never been maternal and "he's never known her to be an affectionate, comforting mother." Drew is scared of what Jazz "might have planned" or "what she could do" to his life. Morely found the story of Jazz and Drew's fractured relationship difficult to portray. He was close to his own mother and believed "it's a stretch to imagine what this would be like for Drew."

Writers created an inheritance scam story for Jazz in which she tries to steal the money her mother set aside for Drew in her will. Jazz does not expect to enjoy spending time with Drew and the pair develop a bond. She is shocked when Drew offers to share the inheritance money equally with Jazz. He later discovers the truth and is left "mortified" and "betrayed" by her scheming.

Jazz moves in with Leah Patterson-Baker (Ada Nicodemou) and the pair end up sharing many arguments. Gordon told an Inside Soap reporter that "I love the relationship between Leah and Jazz. They're both feisty, but in different ways. We had lots of great scenes when Jazz was living with Leah." Writers created feud story between Jazz and Amanda Vale (Holly Brisley), both characters assumed the role of the show's "femme fatales". When Jazz was introduced into the series, an article published on the show's official website revealed that Jazz would fill the role Amanda played in the show. It stated that she took on the "sexy but manipulative lady with penchant for cheeky afternoon chardys" left vacant by Amanda.

When Amanda returns, they are depicted as enemies which stems from Amanda sleeping with Drew, which Jazz does not approve of. When they both try to support Leah following the death of her husband Dan, they clash. They trade insults followed by slapping each other across the face. Gordon and Brisley struggled to film the scenes because they found them comical. Gordon told a Yahoo! 7 reporter that "it was so ridiculous trying to keep a straight face doing those scenes. We had a really good time, she’s a lovely girl and we are both very different from the characters we play." The pair were later featured in more sparring scenes in which they mock each other's parental skills.

Jazz gets caught up in Johnny Cooper's (Callan Mulvey) revenge plan against residents of Summer Bay. He takes Jazz hostage and ties her up. Gordon said that enjoyed filming the scenes and praised Mulvey's villainous portrayal. She added that she was not afraid during filming and quipped that she enjoyed being tied up.

=== Departure ===
In September 2007, Gordon announced that she was leaving the role and would film her final scenes as Jazz in October 2007. When she finished filming she and her husband went to pursue acting roles in the United States.

== Storylines ==
Jazz arrives in the bay to try to make amends with her son Drew, who she had sent to boarding school when he was only young. He rejects her at first, but he moves in with her after he uses her cheque book to buy himself a car. She begins a brief relationship with Tony Holden (Jon Sivewright). During this time she exposes the fact that Drew's friend, Jules made a pass at her when he was younger, prompting Jules to leave.

Jazz contacts her solicitor Dane Jordans (Myles Pollard) and later tries to seduce Dane into withholding her mother's inheritance from Drew. Morag Bellingham (Cornelia Frances) discovers Jazz had seduced a member of staff from her mother's care home and Dane refuses to support her in this legal battle. Jazz is also involved in a divorce case with her husband Kevin Freeman, who wants to reconcile with her. However, this falls through when Drew exposes Jazz's affair with Tony to him, and Kevin leaves taking his daughters, Bree and Essie with him. Drew tries to drive Jazz away from town after faking a powercut at her home, but it backfires when a fire starts, nearly killing Jazz. Drew agrees to give Jazz his inheritance, on the condition she leaves Summer Bay. Jazz takes the money and departs.

Several months later, following the death of Drew's uncle Dan, Jazz returns for his funeral and begins arguing with Dan's ex-wife Amanda much to the chagrin of Dan's widow, Leah. She tries restart her relationship with Tony but he tells her he is now involved with Rachel Armstrong (Amy Mathews). Jazz then takes a job at Summer Bay High working for Martin Bartlett (Bob Baines) as his secretary and begins dating Miles Copeland (Josh Quong Tart). In order to keep her job, She blackmails Martin when she spots him an underground fight. However, Miles finds out and dumps her.

Jazz later gets into a fight with Christine Jones (Elizabeth Alexander) at Jack Holden (Paul O'Brien) and Martha MacKenzie's (Jodi Gordon) engagement party. She confides in Tony that she still loves him and wants to change. He suggests she leaves Summer Bay to start a new life in the city near Drew, which she does.

== Reception ==
For her portrayal of Jazz, Gordon received a nomination for "Best Newcomer" at the first Digital Spy Soap Awards. A writer from Yahoo! 7 branded Jazz a "femme fatale" and a "stunning leggy brunette". Of Jazz and Amanda's feud they added that "while their looks are at the opposite ends of the spectrum, they have both reigned as super-bitches and were fighting for supremacy."
