= List of Home and Away characters introduced in 2008 =

Home and Away is an Australian television soap opera. It was first broadcast on the Seven Network on 17 January 1988. The following is a list of characters that first appeared during 2008, by order of first appearance. They were all introduced by series producer Cameron Welsh. The 21st season of Home and Away began airing from 28 January 2008. Principal Martin Bartlett, played by Bob Baines was the first introduction of the year in February. Trent Dalzell as Axel Hay, David Downer as Ross Buckton and Celeste Dodwell as Melody Jones made their first appearances in March. Tessa James arrived as Nicole Franklin in April. Jordan Rodrigues and Oliver Davis joined the cast as Jai Fernandez and Oliver Phillips in May. Esther Anderson and Rebecca Breeds made their debuts as Charlie and Ruby Buckton in June. Luke Jacobz and Paul Pantano debuted on 8 July as Angelo Rosetta and Elliot Gillen, respectively. David Jones-Roberts began appearing as Xavier Austin in November.

== Martin Bartlett ==
Martin Bartlett
- Home and Away character
- Portrayed by: Bob Baines
- Duration: 2008–09
- First appearance: 12 February 2008
- Last appearance: 30 September 2009
- Created by: Bevan Lee
In-universe information
- Occupation: Principal of Summer Bay High (2008–09)

Martin Bartlett, portrayed by Bob Baines, made his first appearance on 12 February 2008. In one storyline Martin forms an attraction to his school secretary Kirsty Sutherland (Christie Hayes). Hayes told Jason Herbison from Inside Soap that "things are really awkward between Kirsty and Bartlett, because he's fallen for her in a big way, but she rejected him and is now dating Miles Copeland (Josh Quong Tart)." When he sacks Kirsty she takes a job as an escort. But she is unaware Martin uses escorts at the Sands resort. Hayes explained that Kirsty is "horrified to discover that her date is principal Bartlett. It's really humiliating for both of them, because Bartlett recently admitted to having feelings for Kirsty." She does not want to be there but Martin convinces her to stay.

Martin, who has taught Science for a number of years at Summer Bay High is introduced when Sally Fletcher (Kate Ritchie) introduces him as the new deputy, replacing the departed Donald Fisher (Norman Coburn). Following Sally's stabbing at the hands of Johnny Cooper (Callan Mulvey), Martin is appointed principal by the school board. One of his first acts is to hire Jazz Curtis (Rachel Gordon) as his secretary, after she blackmails him, after seeing him at an illegal fight Ric Dalby (Mark Furze) is involved in. He then sacks Jazz. After a clash with one of his former students, Kirsty, Martin hires her as Jazz's replacement. He forms an attraction to Kirsty, even to the extent of taking the blame for being Kirsty's three-year-old son, Oliver (Oliver Davis) breaking his arm while Annie Campbell (Charlotte Best) and Jai Fernandez (Jordan Rodrigues) are supposed to be babysitting him. He reveals to Kirsty that his mother brought him up on his own, like she is doing with Oliver while his father, Kane (Sam Atwell) is in prison.

Martin learns of Kirsty's relationship with Miles and he fires her but writes her a reference enabling her to get a job at the sands resort. Things escalate when Miles discovers Kirsty is working as an escort at the Sands, where Martin is paying for such services, leading to a confrontation between Miles and Martin. Martin causes further irritation when he reveals himself as Kirsty's secret benefactor.

At the senior formal which is held in the Surf Club which Martin hosts, Kane's car crashes through the wall. Martin tries to contain the panicky teenagers but is knocked to the ground and trampled, resulting in fractured ribs. He and Kane are hospitalized but recover. Martin arranges a school trek in memory of Dan Baker (Tim Campbell) on the anniversary of his death for some of the students to take part in. Jai and Annie disappear much to his ire and things are exacerbated when Trey Palmer (Luke Bracey) holds the everybody hostage by planting a bomb underneath the bus. Hugo Austin (Bernard Curry) later defuses the bomb. The strain of recent events becomes apparent and Martin leaves for a cruise but not before appointing Gina Austin (Sonia Todd) new principal.

== Axel Hay ==
Axel Hay
- Home and Away character
- Portrayed by: Trent Dalzell
- First appearance: 19 March 2008
- Last appearance: 11 July 2008
- Introduced by: Cameron Welsh
In-universe information
- Occupation: Student at Summer Bay High
- Mother: Mrs Hay
- Sisters: Danielle Hay

Axel Hay, portrayed by Trent Dalzell, made his first appearance on 19 March 2008.

In the build-up to Axel's exit from the series, he and Jai Fernandez (Jordan Rodrigues) are knocked over by a drunken Larry Jefferies (Paul Gleeson) and he leaves the scene. Todd Lasance who plays Aden Jefferies in the series told Jason Herbison of Inside Soap that "suddenly you see Larry lose control of his car and hit something... While Jai's basically okay, Axel's rushed into hospital in a serious condition." But the two characters are left unable to remember who knocked them over. Lasance added that they do remember seeing a silver estate car, which makes him realise that his father was the perpetrator.

Axel is first seen alongside classmate Aden. Axel attends Nicole Franklin's (Tessa James) house party and makes advances towards on to Belle Taylor (Jessica Tovey) but is rejected. He then finds Melody Jones (Celeste Dodwell) crying in a bedroom and feigns an attempt to comfort her and attempts to rape her. When Geoff Campbell (Lincoln Lewis) finds out what happened, he threatens Axel, who is later beaten up and found on the beach by Belle. When Axel wakes up in hospital, he is reluctant to tell the police anything and suspicion falls on Geoff and Aden. Belle quickly works out Aden is responsible for Axel's attack after he shows his callous attitude, stating that Axel "got what he deserved". Axel's reputation later takes a dive and he apologises to Melody and makes friends with Jai. Axel and Jai are involved in a road accident caused by Aden's father, Axel dies as a result. Axel appears to Melody as a vision when she begins having nightmares about him.

== Ross Buckton ==
Ross Buckton
- Home and Away character
- Portrayed by: David Downer
- Duration: 2008–09
- First appearance: 21 May 2008
- Last appearance: 28 October 2009
- Introduced by: Cameron Welsh
In-universe information
- Occupation: Police Officer
- Wife: Elsie Buckton (until 2008); Morag Bellingham (2008–09)
- Daughters: Charlie Buckton
- Granddaughters: Ruby Buckton

Ross Michael Buckton, played by David Downer, made his first appearance on 21 May 2008. Ross arrives at Yabbie Creek Police Station to investigate the murder of Sam Holden (Jessica Chapnik). He interviews Martha MacKenzie (Jodi Gordon), the ex-wife of Sam's widower, Jack (Paul O'Brien) and quizzes her over a suicide note, which he believes to be fake. After some new evidence is discovered, Ross suspends the interview with Martha and brings Jazz Curtis (Rachel Gordon) in for questioning when new evidence is discovered.

Ross is determined to expose Jack and Martha as Sam's murderers but is unable to when Morag Bellingham (Cornelia Frances) proves that Sam committed suicide and he is forced to drop the charges. It is soon revealed that Ross and Morag were previously involved in a relationship after the collapse of Morag's marriage to Richard (John Bonney).

Ross and Morag begin dating again but a few hurdles get in the way of the relationship including Ross's lies about his wife Elsie's death and opposition from Ross' daughter, Charlie who sends texts warning Morag off. Ross' other daughter Ruby, is warmer to Morag and eventually Charlie accepts the relationship. Ross later proposes and he and Morag marry in a small ceremony with friends and family present before honeymooning in Europe.

Ross and Morag return to the bay the following year, It becomes apparent there are problems in the marriage when Morag appears stressed and Ross, forgetful. Ross disappears one night and is found wandering around by Charlie and tells her he is suffering from jetlag. The extent of Ross' problems becomes evident when he reopens a cold case and searches for a body only for Jack to find the case had been solved years ago. After He goes missing again, Ross is taken to the hospital and diagnosed with Alzheimers' by Rachel Armstrong (Amy Mathews). When Ross nearly burns down Leah Patterson-Baker's (Ada Nicodemou) house while trying to cook breakfast, he and his family realise he needs help. Ross agrees to go into care and Morag offers to go with him.

When Grant Bledcoe's (Clayton Watson) body is found on the beach, Charlie is the prime suspect and is suspended from the force, however, Ross comes forward and admits he killed Grant for raping Charlie when they were teenagers. Ross is then charged with Murder and awaits trial. In 2011, Ross dies and his funeral is held in Summer Bay.

== Melody Jones ==
Melody Jones, played by Celeste Dodwell. Dodwell's casting was announced in December 2007, and had completed her drama HSC. Dodwell originally auditioned for the role of Nicole Franklin, however Tessa James became the successful candidate. Dodwell's agent informed her about Melody's "character breakdown" and she said that it "intrigued" her. Dodwell later decided to quit the serial in order to attend drama school in the United Kingdom.

== Nicole Franklin ==
Nicole Franklin, played by Tessa James, debuted on-screen during the episode airing on 18 April 2008. James' casting was announced in January 2008 it was announced Executive producer Cameron Welsh said "She is an exciting talent and I think audiences are going to love her character and respond really well to her." James then moved to Sydney especially for the role. Speaking of working on the serial James stated: "Working on a series like this [Home and Away] is the best training you can get, I look at it like an apprenticeship and never forget how lucky I am." Fellow cast member Celeste Dodwell who plays Melody Jones originally auditioned for the part of Nicole. Holy Soap said that Nicole's most memorable moment was when she "returned to the desert island with Geoff to rekindle their love" and she was held hostage by Derek the murderer, before her father came to the rescue. Inside Soap opined that Nicole was a "flighty minx from the city who prays at the altar of Paris Hilton". The Daily Record branded her a "fiery favourite"TV Week chose James as one of the serial's most promising actresses opining she was ready for roles in Hollywood.

== Jai Fernandez ==
Jai Fernandez
- Home and Away character
- Portrayed by: Jordan Rodrigues
- Duration: 2008–09
- First appearance: 19 May 2008
- Last appearance: 21 October 2009
- Introduced by: Cameron Welsh
In-universe information
- Occupation: Student at Summer Bay High (2008–09)
- Father: William Fernandez
- Mother: Nadieen Fernandez

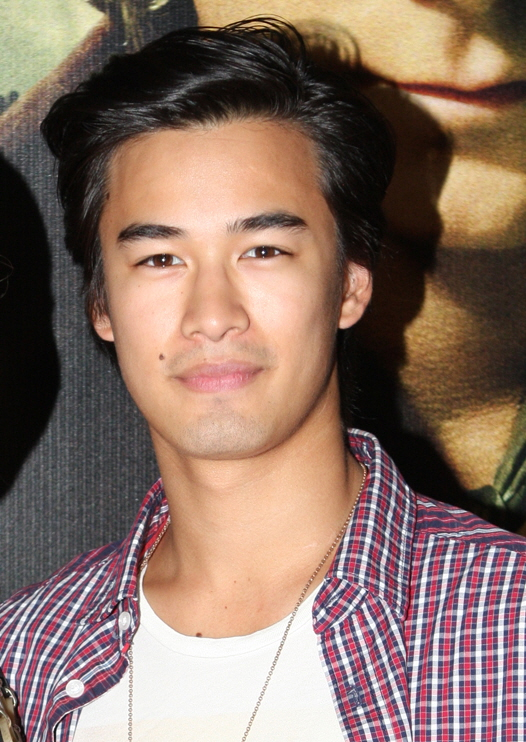
Jordan Rodrigues plays Jai Fernandez

Jai Fernandez, played by Jordan Rodrigues, first appeared during the episode transmitted on 19 May 2008. Rodrigues joined the cast in 2008 and he told Carolyn Stewart from TV Week that it had been a "whole new experience" for him because he was used to stage work. He added that he was excited about being recognised by viewers. Jai has a back story in which he lost his entire family in Phuket during the 2004 Boxing Day Tsunami and he met the established character of Miles Copeland (Josh Quong Tart) who had also suffered the deaths of his relatives. Rodrigues told Stewart that the character's loss created a "connection" between them and it made Miles bring Jai to Summer Bay. But as Miles previously left Jai in Phuket, this creates problems between them. Rodrigues explained that "Jai's angry at the world after Miles ditched him in Phuket. Miles is now trying to help Jai because he knew he was going through a tough time living in a refuge. But Jai is from the city and doesn't really fit in with the surfy town."

In 2009, Rodrgiues left the serial to join ABC's Dance Academy. For his portrayal of Jai, Rodrigues was nominated in the category of "Most Popular New Talent" at the Logie Awards of 2009.

Jai first appears at a refuge in the city when Miles tracks him down. He is cold and distant towards Miles who said he would always look after him following the deaths of his parents William and Nadieen in a tsunami. After initial reservations, Jai takes Miles up on his offer and returns to Summer Bay with him. Jai struggles to settle into Summer Bay House and struggles to connect with people at school. He makes a friend in fellow outcast Axel Hay (Trent Dalzell) and they get into various kinds of trouble and take a joyride on Matilda Hunter's (Indiana Evans) scooter. The boys are knocked off the Scooter by a drunken Larry Jefferies (Paul Gleeson) and Axel dies in hospital. In the aftermath, Jai becomes convinced he is invincible. He jumps from Jump Rock to prove so, much to the shock of Annie Campbell (Charlotte Best). When Matthew Lyons (Ross Pirelli) throws Jai's school rucksack on the roof of the school, he goes up to retrieve it, despite the danger. Annie, in retaliation tries Jai's stunt but hurts herself. After Jai feels guilty, they share a kiss and become a couple. Jai and Annie's respective guardians Miles and Irene Roberts (Lynne McGranger) try to keep the couple apart but they relent.

Jai and Annie end up in further trouble when Annie is stuck down a storm drain. Charlie Buckton (Esther Anderson) is able to rescue Annie. Trey Palmer (Luke Bracey) begins bullying Jai and harassing Miles and Kirsty Phillips (Christie Hayes). When Trey lies about a sexual relationship with Kirsty things spiral out of control, Jai obtains some information that Trey had weight issues and threatens to use it unless the charges are dropped.

Jai's relationship with Annie takes another turn when he drunkenly reveals at Ruby Buckton's (Rebecca Breeds) 16th birthday party, he wants to sleep with her. Annie promptly breaks up with him. Shortly after, Jai and Xavier Austin (David Jones-Roberts) find an old shotgun at Martha MacKenzie's (Jodi Gordon) farm, which results in Jai being accidentally shot. Jai keeps the injury secret but collapses several days later while on a school trek with Annie. He later recovers. Dexter Walker (Tom Green) takes an interest in Annie which does not sit well with Jai who wants to get back together with her. He is further upset when he finds Annie and Dexter kissing and refuses to listen to their explanations.

Jai's spirits are lifted when Romeo Smith (Luke Mitchell), an old friend from foster care arrives to stay at Summer Bay House. He asks Romeo for his help to win Annie back but the plan backfires when Romeo allows Annie to believe he is responsible for the love poems Jai has been sending her and Jai realises Romeo wants Annie for himself. Jai then accepts a place on the student exchange trip to Japan in order to get away from them both but opts out after Kirsty miscarries Miles' baby and offers to support them and suggests Annie take his place. In the end, both Jai and Annie leave for Japan after a farewell with their friends.

== Oliver Phillips ==
Oliver Phillips
- Home and Away character
- Portrayed by: Oliver Davis
- Duration: 2008-09
- First appearance: 21 May 2008
- Last appearance: 28 October 2009
- Introduced by: Cameron Welsh
In-universe information
- Father: Kane Phillips
- Mother: Kirsty Phillips
- Grandfathers: Gus Phillips; Rhys Sutherland
- Grandmothers: Shelley Sutherland
- Uncles: Scott Phillips
- Aunts: Dani Sutherland; Laura DeGroot; Jade Sutherland (adoptive)

Oliver "Ollie" Phillips is the son of Kirsty (Christie Hayes) and Kane Phillips (Sam Atwell). Ollie is first seen when Irene Roberts (Lynne McGranger) collects him after receiving a phone call. Irene contacts Rachel Armstrong (Amy Mathews) when she discovers Ollie is running a temperature and tells Ollie not to answer any questions when he is asked. Rachel arrives and tells Irene that Ollie needs hospital treatment.

While in hospital, Ollie still remains silent despite efforts from the doctors and police. Kane, who is a fugitive, secretly visits . Several days later, Kirsty takes Ollie out of hospital and attempts to flee after Kane's failed Robbery attempt. There is a police chase but Kane drops them back at Irene's and is arrested and jailed.

Ollie and Kirsty stay with Irene, but problems are caused when Ollie bursts into Belle Taylor's (Jessica Tovey) room exposing her relationship with Aden Jefferies (Todd Lasance) to Geoff Campbell (Lincoln Lewis) and Annie Campbell (Charlotte Best). He causes further problem by colouring on Belle's work. Kirsty then decides to move them into the caravan park, next to her old home Summer Bay house. Miles Copeland invites them to move into the house and they form a family unit with Miles and Jai.

When Kane is released from prison, Ollie spots him in the park and asks him to keep quiet but he is excited and mentions it. Kane decides he wants his family back and the three of them leave. They return however when Kane and Kirsty have relationship difficulties. Ollie is upset when Kane leaves for good but is happy to be back in the bay.

Kirsty discovers she is pregnant and breaks the news to Ollie. He is happy about the idea of a sibling. However, Kirsty loses the baby. Ollie meets his grandmother Shelley Sutherland (Paula Forrest) for the first time when she arrives to comfort Kirsty. Shelley then takes Kirsty and Ollie back to live with the family in the city.

== Charlie Buckton ==
Charlie Buckton made her on-screen debut in the episode airing on 6 June 2008. Anderson, a former model was recruited by Home and Away in a bid to add "sex appeal" to the show. Anderson was a long-time fan of Home and Away and she said she was "thrilled" when she won the role of Charlie after an audition. In November 2011, Jonathon Moran and Elle Halliwell of The Daily Telegraph announced Anderson had quit Home and Away to further her acting career in Hollywood. The following month, Inside Soap writer Sarah Ellis reported Anderson had confirmed her departure from the show. For her portrayal of Charlie, Anderson received a nomination for "Sexiest Female" at the 2008 Inside Soap Awards. In 2010, she was nominated for "Best Daytime Star". That same year saw Anderson earn nominations for the "Most Popular Personality on Australian Television" and "Most Popular Actress" Logie Awards. The episode featuring Charlie's death was nominated for an Australian Writers' Guild award. Kerry Barrett and Carena Crawford of All About Soap said Charlie was both a "sexy sergeant" and the soap opera's "cutest crime fighter".

== Ruby Buckton ==
Ruby Buckton, played by Rebecca Breeds, debuted on-scree on 20 June 2008. Ruby was created by executive producer Cameron Welsh. The serial's official website describes Ruby as being care free, though puts on a front to hide her emotions. Ruby arrives grieving for the loss of her mother, unlike her sister, Ruby takes an "internal approach and bottled it up inside", creating a facade and appearing to be strong. They also brand her as independent and does not care what others think about her and is inclined to keep to herself. Breeds stated: "Ruby has gone through a lot and had to gain a level of independence I really admire. She is free-spirited and sure of whom she is. I love playing Ruby; she is cheeky and easy-going, but very passionate about her family." In June 2012, Erin Miller of "TV Week" was reported that Breeds had filmed her final scenes and left Home and Away. Breeds told Miller that she could not discuss her departure because of her contract with the series. She added that "Ruby is still very much alive, I'm not free of Ruby just yet". Breeds received a Logie Award nomination for "Most Popular New Female Talent" at the 51st Logie Awards for her portrayal of Ruby. and was later nominated for the "Most Popular Actress" Logie in 2010, with Breeds stating: "To know that people like Ruby makes me think I'm doing a good job." At the 2012 Inside Soap Awards, Breeds was nominated for "Best Daytime Star". Holy Soap recall Ruby's most memorable moment as being: "Trying to cope with her Dad's illness, Ruby started talking to someone on Skype, only to find out it was Matthew playing a trick. She got revenge by convincing him to go skinny-dipping and nicking his clothes."

== Angelo Rosetta ==
Angelo Rosetta, played by Luke Jacobz, debuted on 8 July 2008. Jacobz won the role of Angelo in June 2008, following the axing of McLeod's Daughters, with which he had a recurring role. The Courier-Mail reported that Jacobz had moved from South Australia to Sydney and was going to sign up to work as a labourer, when he received the offer to play Angelo. Jacobz was originally signed to the show for six months. In February 2011, a writer for TV Week announced that Jacobz had left Home and Away. They said Jacobz would be seen on screen for a few more months, but the actor had finished filming. The serial's official website describe Angelo stating: "Growing up in a close-knit family; with three brothers, Angelo was generally perceived as the loudmouth, boofhead kid who would never amount to much." Jacobz received a nomination for 'Most Popular Actor' at the 2010 Logie Awards for his portrayal of Angelo. In the same year, he was also nominated for "Best Daytime Star" at the Inside Soap Awards.

== Elliot Gillen ==
Elliot Gillen
- Home and Away character
- Portrayed by: Paul Pantano
- First appearance: 8 July 2008
- Last appearance: 26 August 2008
- Introduced by: Cameron Welsh
In-universe information
- Brothers: Mark Gillen

Elliot Gillen, played by Paul Pantano, made his first appearance on 8 July 2008. The character comes to Summer Bay to talk to Roman Harris (Conrad Coleby) about his brother, Mark's death. Pantano told a writer for TV Week that Elliot and Roman have never met before, but as soon as Elliot mentions that he is Mark's brother, Roman knows exactly who he is talking about. Asked what his character wants to know, Pantano explained: "Elliot's pretty straight up when he asks Roman what happened to his brother, so Roman's a bit suspicious about what's really going on." Elliot is "not satisfied" with Roman's story, so he decides to stay in the Bay, where he develops a romantic relationship with Roman's daughter Nicole Franklin (Tessa James). Elliot later puts the lives of Roman, Nicole and Geoff Campbell (Lincoln Lewis) in danger. Elliot blames Roman for his brother's death and warns Nicole that he wants revenge. Roman is left stranded in the bush while Nicole and Geoff become stranded on an island. James told a reporter from Inside Soap that Elliot causes Geoff injuries when he attacks him with a spear-gun. She added that "Elliot sets up a life and death obstacle course for Roman to work his way through". Pantano was included in Digital Spy's gay feature.

Elliot arrives in Summer Bay in search of Roman. It soon emerges that Elliot's brother, Mark, had served in the SAS with Roman, but had been killed when they were deployed to Afghanistan. Near the second anniversary of Mark's death, Elliot presses Roman for the truth, despite hearing an official enquiry. Roman tells him that their group had been ambushed and outnumbered by the enemy and Mark was lost and presumed dead. Elliot refuses to accept this story and begins playing mind games with Roman, first by dating his 17-year-old daughter, Nicole. Roman tries to warn Nicole off but she refuses to listen. However, the relationship breaks down and Elliot snaps and sets up the second phase of his plan to get to Roman. He kidnaps Nicole and leaves a ransom DVD for Roman instructing him to drink a flask of liquid or he will never see her again. Elliot forces Nicole onto a boat, preparing to take her out to sea, when they are spotted by Geoff Campbell, who decides to join them. Once out at sea, Elliot and Nicole leave the boat, where Elliot tightens her oxygen tank around her, causing her to struggle to stay afloat. Elliot then returns to the boat without her, where he is confronted by Geoff, who asks her where she is, but Elliot grabs a spear gun and shoots him in the leg, leaving them both out at sea.

After Roman complies and drinks the flask, he finds himself hanging upside down from a cliff edge. Elliot then sets some traps for Roman to follow. While following the path, Roman is shot in the arm by Elliot with an arrow, narrowly misses a landslide, and survives a mine blast attached to a tripwire before quickly overpowering Elliot just as he's about to leave the bush by knocking him out, and Elliot is then taken to Yabbie Creek police station and arrested. While in custody, Roman reveals to Elliot that Mark had wanted to surrender when they were ambushed and selfishly threatened to shoot Adam, a member of their own squad, if they did not surrender, and that he had to shoot Mark to prevent him from doing so, and Roman and the others escaped while the enemy captured and killed Mark. Having been forced to learn the hard truth that his brother was nothing but a selfish coward who deliberately disobeyed orders and refused to do his duty for his squad, Elliot breaks down, realising he committed all his actions against Roman for nothing, and ultimately reveals Nicole's location on the island before being charged with kidnapping and attempted murder.

== Xavier Austin ==
Xavier Austin, played by David Jones-Roberts, made his first appearance on 20 November 2008 and departed on 3 July 2012, Xavier was seen leaving Summer Bay to live in Goulburn permanently. Jones-Roberts had previously auditioned for the serial four times before landing the role of Xavier and stated the result was "all the more awesome" because he had to wait for such a long time. Whilst surfing his agent told him he had the role over a pay-phone Soap opera reporting website Holy Soap recall Xavier's most memorable moment as being: "Watching in horror as Brendan caused a horrific car accident with his catapult."

== Others ==
Date(s)	Character	Actor	Circumstances
28 January–11 February	Aaron Copeland	Timothy Walter	Aaron is the late father of Sally Fletcher (Kate Ritchie) and Miles Copeland (Home and Away) (Josh Quong Tart) who appears in flashbacks. Aaron and his wife Diana had marital difficulties due to Aaron's alcoholism and domestic abuse. Diana threatened to leave, taking the twins with her. Aaron ran away with Miles in the night, leaving Sally with Diana as he felt the road was no place for her. In 1988, Aaron learned of the death of Diana and her new husband Derek Wilson in a boating accident and tried to reclaim the orphaned Sally. He and Miles tried to track down Diana's mother, Mrs. Keating in a nursing home where she had been diagnosed with Alzheimer's disease. He learned through her carers that Sally had been fostered by Tom (Roger Oakley) and Pippa Fletcher (Vanessa Downing), who had moved to Summer Bay. After he and Miles tracked down Sally in the Bay but after learning about the Fletchers, Aaron decided Sally was better off with them. Aaron died in 2000 after years of alcoholism caught up with him.
11 February	Diana Wilson	Uncredited	Diana is the late mother of Sally Fletcher (Kate Ritchie) and Miles Copeland (Home and Away) (Josh Quong Tart) who appears in Flashbacks. Her marriage to Aaron was rife with arguments. She threatened to leave him and take the children. After Aaron disappeared with Miles, Diana married Derek Wilson but both were later killed in a boating accident.
11 February	Mrs Keating	Uncredited	Mrs. Keating is the mother of Diana Wilson and Ross Keating, and grandmother of Sally Fletcher (Kate Ritchie) and Miles Copeland (Josh Quong Tart) who appears in flashbacks to 1988 where she is seen in a care home due to suffering from Alzheimer's.
18 February–23 August 2010	Anasthesist	Philip Dodd	An Anasthestist at Northern Districts Hospital who attends to Sally Fletcher (Kate Ritchie) after she is stabbed by Johnny Cooper (Callan Mulvey). He later treats Penn Graham (Christian Clark) following an assault.
28 February–23 May	Gavin Johnson	Daniel Feuerriegel	Gavin is the editor of the Coastal News and Belle Taylor's (Jessica Tovey) boss. He interviews Aden Jefferies (Todd Lasance) and several other students at Dan Baker's (Tim Campbell) memorial service. Gavin then makes Aden's speech the focus of the story. He causes problems with Belle when he rewrites an article on Sally Fletcher (Kate Ritchie), painting her in a negative light. Drew Curtis (Bobby Morley) intervenes on Belle's behalf and nearly costs her the job. Gavin and Belle later reach a compromise.
4 March–13 June	Cara Phillips	Holly Robinson	Cara is classmate of Annie Campbell (Charlotte Best). She and a friend, Britney spy on Miles Copeland (Josh Quong Tart) and Jazz Curtis (Rachel Gordon) on their date. Cara later upsets Melody Jones (Celeste Dodwell) by insisting she is making too big a deal of Axel Hay's (Trent Dalzell) attempted attack on her. She apologises but Melody walks away.
18 March	Steve Bradford	Nicholas Holland	Steve arrives in Summer Bay to meet Dan Baker (Tim Campbell) widow, Leah Patterson-Baker (Ada Nicodemou) and presents her with a cheque for $100,000 in gratitude to Dan saving his son's life while on an abseiling trip in America.
20 March–16 April	Joe Stephens	Terence Hepburn	Joe is a bartender who is paid $1000 by Sam Holden (Jessica Chapnik) to beat her up. Joe is reluctant at first but complies with Sam's request. The following month, after Sam's death, her widower Jack Holden (Paul O'Brien) asks Joe if he had seen her in the days leading up to her death. He tells him, he sold her some heroin and she attacked him and had to be restrained by two associates, resulting in her arms being bruised.
25 March–12 May	Logan Roth	Radek Jonak	Logan is an associate of Johnny Cooper (Callan Mulvey). He is hired by Noel Anderson (Steven Vidler) to have an underground fight with Ric Dalby (Mark Furze). Logan easily defeats Ric, who is suffering from pneumonia causing punters to believe Ric has thrown the match. They have a rematch and Logan seems to have the upper hand until Emergency sirens are heard. Noel orders the fight to continue holding everybody at gunpoint but the fight is stopped and he is arrested.
10 April–27 January 2009	Matthew Lyons	Ross Pirelli	Matthew is a Year 9 classmate of Jai Fernandez (Jordan Rodrigues), Annie Campbell (Charlotte Best) and Ruby Buckton (Rebecca Breeds). He and his friends begin bullying Jai, including throwing his bag on the roof and pushing him off the pier into the water. He later causes trouble by antagonising Aden Jefferies (Todd Lasance) and Melody Jones (Celeste Dodwell). Matthew tricks Ruby by pretending to be a girl named 'Skye' online in order to get close to her. Annie and Jai find out and force him to tell Ruby the truth. Ruby invites Matthew to go skinny-dipping with her and steals his clothes and hides them in a sand dune while Annie and Jai film the whole thing. The footage is uploaded onto the Internet and Matthew is humiliated. He photocopies Ruby's journal which contains information about her crush on Miles Copeland (Josh Quong Tart), and spreads the copies around the school. Matthew is then suspended. He later dates Melody and leads her astray by giving her marijuana at the school formal.
14 April	Britt Grey	Meagan Drury	Britt is Sam Holden's (Jessica Chapnik) estranged sister. Following Sam's death, she takes custody of her nephew, Rory Tolhurst (Jack Rickard). Morag Bellingham (Cornelia Frances) visits Britt during the investigation into Sam's death and asks several questions in order to piece together events.
6–13 May	Danielle Hay	Katrina Risteska	Danielle is Axel Hay's (Trent Dalzell) younger sister. She makes a suggestion in Miles Copeland's (Josh Quong Tart) Year 11 English class to study Spring Awakening as opposed to King Lear.Danielle later gets into a fight with Nicole Franklin (Tessa James), which is recorded by Christine Jones (Elizabeth Alexander).
7 May–26 February 2009	Christine Jones	Elizabeth Alexander	Christine is Melody Jones' (Celeste Dodwell) mother. She arrives at Summer Bay High to discuss the addition of Spring Awakening to the syllabus. She butts heads with Melody's English teacher, Miles Copeland (Josh Quong Tart) over the book and promptly burns a copy in front of the class. Christine causes further trouble when she secretly films Nicole Franklin (Tessa James) and Danielle Hay (Katrina Risteska) fighting and cites behaviour issues. She conspires to get Miles fired but Morag Bellingham (Cornelia Frances) reminds her that recording students without permission is illegal. Christine withdraws but later causes problems in Melody's relationship with Geoff Campbell (Lincoln Lewis) and takes out a restraining order against Geoff. She later attempts to perform an exorcism on Melody but is stopped by Geoff and Miles. Christine reappears a few months later seemingly changed but Melody refuses to believe her. After the death of her mother, Audrey Long, Christine decides to leave for New Zealand and Melody goes with her in order to build their relationship.
19 May	Peter Randall	Richard Gyoerffy	Peter runs a teen refuge in the city. Miles Copeland (Josh Quong Tart) visits asking him about Jai Fernandez (Jordan Rodrigues) who is staying at the refuge. Peter tells Miles that Jai rarely speaks to anyone and is very withdrawn.
30 May	Jamie Cooper	Shardyn Fahey-Leigh	Jamie is Julie Cooper's (Lisa Hayson-Phillips) son. He attends a Nippers session coached by Jack Holden (Paul O'Brien). Jamie is afraid to go into the water as he was previously stung. Jack checks for jellyfish but the other boys make fun of Jamie. To restore Jamie's confidence, Jack arranges a beach sprint, which Jamie wins.
12 June–5 November 2012	Georgina Watson	Jaclyn Albergoni	Watson is an officer at Yabbie Creek Police Station. She first appears when Kane Phillips (Sam Atwell) is transferred to a city prison. Watson often clashes with Charlie Buckton (Esther Anderson) over police matters but ultimately they become friends. Following Charlie's death, Watson is promoted to Sergeant.
14 June–27 August	Jimmy Crawford	Adam Booth	Jimmy is psychiatric patient who is admitted to Northern Districts hospital. He screams that the doctors are trying to kill him. Ric Dalby (Mark Furze) is able to calm him before his treatment. He is readmitted after Charlie Buckton (Esther Anderson) arrests him for threatening a group of people with a broken bottle. Rachel Armstrong (Amy Mathews) defuses the situation. Several weeks later, Jimmy is admitted to hospital again after breaking a glass at Noah's bar after Alf Stewart (Ray Meagher) refuses to serve him anymore alcohol. Rachel puts Jimmy on some new medication. He later forms an attachment to Rachel and asks for an invite to her wedding to Tony Holden (Jon Sivewright) but she tells him the event is friends and family only. Jimmy's behaviour forces Rachel to cease treating him, upsetting him. When Rachel disappears, he is under suspicion of kidnapping her but is cleared when makes a statement saying he had only seen her on the day of her disappearance to give her a wedding present.
20–27 June	Pat Jenkins	Lachlan Buchanan	Pat is Ruby Buckton's (Rebecca Breeds) boyfriend. It is revealed that he was the maintenance man at Ruby's last school and she was expelled as a result of her relationship with him. Ruby's father, Ross (David Downer) is unimpressed with Pat but changes his attitude when he tells him he cares for Ruby. Pat leaves the following week after telling Ruby he feels their relationship will not work in the long run.
11 July	Mrs. Hay	Amelia Longhurst	Mrs. Hay is the mother of Axel Hay (Trent Dalzell) and his sister Danielle (Katrina Risteska). She arrives at the hospital after learning that Axel and Jai Fernandez (Jordan Rodrigues) have been in a road accident with Larry Jefferies (Paul Gleeson). Axel dies, leaving her devastated.
15–24 July	Daisy Alexander	Jessica Smith	Daisy is Matilda Hunter's (Indiana Evans) roommate at University in Perth. Daisy encourages Matilda not to think about her boyfriend Ric Dalby (Mark Furze) and tries talking her attending a party. She later suggests that Matilda should give resident advisor Nathan Cunningham (Andrew Lees) a chance. Daisy tries to mediate when Ric and Matilda have an argument and tells Matilda Ric is in Perth permanently, in order to be with her.
15–24 July	Nathan Cunningham	Andrew Lees	Nathan is the resident advisor at Matilda Hunter's (Indiana Evans) University Campus in Perth. He tries to get Matilda to a party and later to a gig, but she declines. One night Nathan gets drunk and crashes in Matilda's room, sleeping in her bed. When Matilda's boyfriend Ric Dalby (Mark Furze) arrives to see her the next morning, he spots Nathan and jumps to conclusions. Nathan later tells Matilda to forget about Ric but she takes offence and tells him to leave her alone.
1 September–6 October	Edward Jones	Errol Henderson	Edward is the husband of Christine Jones (Elizabeth Alexander). and the father of their daughter, Melody (Celeste Dodwell). He appears when Melody is placed into a mental hospital. He is annoyed when Aden Jefferies (Todd Lasance) talks to Melody. Edward asks Roman Harris (Conrad Coleby) to keep Aden away from his daughter. Aden tells Edward he was the one who beat up Axel Hay (Trent Dalzell) after his attempted rape of Melody, while Edward did nothing, prompting him to feel ashamed. When Melody escapes the Clinic, he asks Nicole Franklin (Tessa James) to get her to return. Following their separation, Christine asks Edward to pretend they are getting back together in order to get Melody to come home but the plan backfires and she tells them she wants nothing to do with either of them.
2 September 2008 – 3 February 2009	Bridget Simmons	Joy Smithers	Bridget has a one-night stand with Tony Holden (Jon Sivewright) after his fiancée Rachel Armstrong (Amy Mathews) fails to turn up on their wedding day, He turns to Bridget for comfort and they sleep together while in Broken Hill. When the affair is revealed, Bridget turns to Alf Stewart (Ray Meagher) for a job and he offers a chance to work at his Bait Shop. Brian Lawler (Ric Herbet), Bridget's partner in crime arrives in the bay. It emerges both are con artists and Brian blackmails Bridget for money, which she later borrows from Alf. Leah Patterson-Baker (Ada Nicodemou) inherits her late husband Dan's (Tim Campbell) life insurance, Bridget steals her license and tries to use it to obtain the funds at the bank but is unsuccessful after failing security questions, arousing suspicion from the teller. Brian refuses to give up and blackmails her into continuing the scam. Bridget's lies spiral out of control, culminating in Brian kidnapping Leah's son VJ (Felix Dean). VJ is rescued and Brian arrested but names Bridget as an accomplice, resulting in her arrest. Bridget then tells the truth to Alf, who refuses to forgive her.
3–4 September	Earl Pincus	Alan Cinis	Earl is a homeless man who arrives in Summer Bay to try his luck. Miles Copeland (Josh Quong Tart) gives him some money for a meal. Earl is later reported for public indecency while bathing nude in the sea. Miles offers him the use of the Caravan Park's shower block. Several days later Earl steals Ruby Buckton's (Rebecca Breeds) bag and runs away.
15 September–10 November	Murray Buchanan	Ben Tari	Murray is a council worker who meets with Belle Taylor (Jessica Tovey) and tells her about buried toxic waste hidden under some a new land development. When the council test the soil and the sample results are uncontaminated, it becomes clear that Murray has been paid off despite denials. Local developer Tim Coleman threatens Murray and he later disappears. However, Murray is able to track down Belle's memory card for her camera and informs Angelo Rosetta (Luke Jacobz).
26 September 2008 – 27 January 2009	Tim Coleman	Keiran Darcy-Smith	Tim hires Aden Jefferies (Todd Lasance) to work on his construction site. He becomes wary of Aden's journalist girlfriend Belle Taylor (Jessica Tovey) and threatens to fire Aden if he continues hanging around with her. He eventually fires Aden after some plans disappear from the site office. Tim concocts a story that Aden has been injured at the site in order to distract Belle, in order for someone to steals the back. Tim later murders Eric "Nobby" Nobbes after he learns he was wearing a wire in a failed plan orchestrated by constable Angelo Rosetta (Luke Jacobz). Tim arranges to meet Angelo at the site but does not arrive and a shaky Angelo shoots Jack Holden (Paul O'Brien) dead. Tim is arrested by Charlie Buckton Esther Anderson who tells him she knows he did not kill Jack but knows he knows who did.
22 October–5 November	Natalie Franklin	Adrienne Pickering	Natalie is the ex-girlfriend of Roman Harris (Conrad Coleby) and the mother of Nicole Franklin (Tessa James). Natalie's relationship with Nicole is strained as Nicole told her that her husband Roy had made advances towards her and Natalie believed Roy over Nicole. Natalie assures her that she believed Nicole was telling the truth and has thrown Roy out. At a party, the truth is revealed to be the opposite, Roy threw Natalie out. Roman agrees to let her stay much to the chagrin of his girlfriend Charlie Buckton. Natalie's irresponsible behaviour comes to ahead when Nicole drives her and a date home, resulting in them being pulled over by Charlie. Natalie later leaves the Bay after making peace with Roman and Nicole.
23 October 2008 – 3 February 2009	Brian Lawler	Ric Herbert	Brian arrives looking for Bridget Simmons (Joy Smithers) and catches up with her, demanding back the money she owes him. Bridget then asks for his help in order to scam Alf Stewart (Ray Meagher). Brian then pushes Bridget to steal Leah Patterson-Baker's (Ada Nicodemou) payment from her husband Dan Baker's (Tim Campbell) life insurance. Bridget fails and becomes reluctant to continue. Brian threatens to implicate her then kidnaps VJ and demands $30,000 from Leah. VJ tries to escape but Brians threatens him. The police arrive when Brian tries to flee with VJ and he is arrested. As he is taken away, Brian confesses and points a finger at Bridget, leading to her eventual arrest.
18–24 November	Eric "Nobby" Nobbes	Mark Casamento	Nobby is a suspect in the assault of Belle Taylor (Jessica Tovey). He admits being in Belle's room stealing items from her when she entered and attacked her. It emerges that Tim Coleman had paid Nobby to retrieve Belle's memory card containing photos which expose toxic waste at Tim's development site. He is then bailed and Angelo Rosetta (Luke Jacobz) asks him to meet him at his house. Angelo asks Nobby to wear a wire in order to find out what Tim is up to. Nobby meets Tim and begins questions, however Tim is suspicious. After Angelo is interrupted by Belle, he rewinds the conversation, which is cut short when Tim discovers the recording. Nobby is killed and his grave is filled with cement.
