= Jessica McNamee =

Australian actress

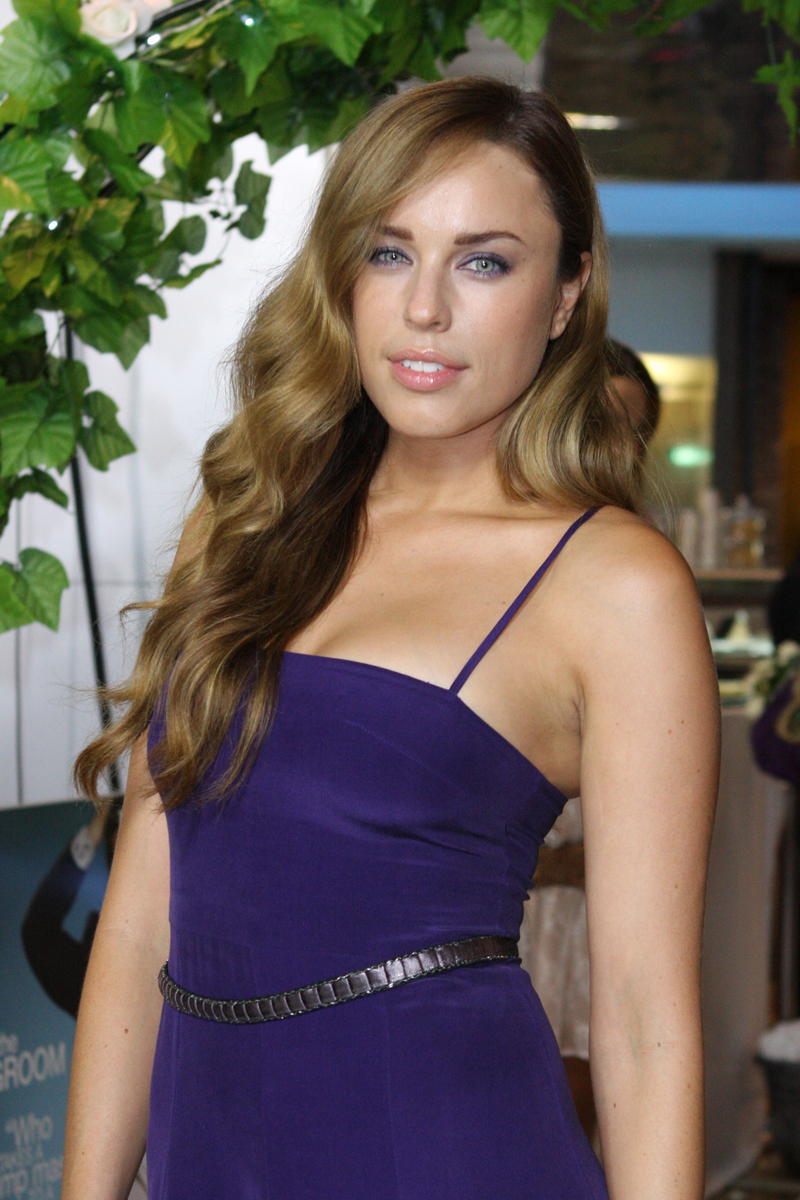
- McNamee in 2012
- Born: Sydney, New South Wales, Australia
- Occupations: Actress; model
- Years active: 2007–present
- Spouse: Patrick Caruso (m. 2019)
- Relatives: Penny McNamee (sister); Teagan Croft (niece)

Jessica McNamee is an Australian actress and model. She is known for her recurring role as Lisa Duffy in Home and Away, her acting debut, and her leading roles as Sammy Rafter in Packed to the Rafters, for which she rose to prominence in Australia, and as patrol officer Theresa Kelly in the USA Network series Sirens. Her film roles include The Vow (2012), Chips (2017), Battle of the Sexes (2017), The Meg (2018) and as Sonya Blade in Mortal Kombat (2021) and its sequel Mortal Kombat II (2026).

== Career ==
McNamee secured a role in the Seven Network soap opera Home and Away playing the role of Lisa Duffy. She went on to play Sammy Rafter in the television series Packed to the Rafters. In 2009, McNamee was a contestant on the ninth series of Dancing with the Stars. She was partnered with dancer Stefano Olivieri and they were eliminated before the final.

The role of Sammy in Packed to the Rafters left McNamee keen to lose the "good girl" image the role created. In the series production breaks, she decided to take on different roles. She starred in the horror film The Loved Ones; which premiered at the Toronto International Film Festival in 2009. In mid-2010, she made the short film 50-50.

McNamee went on to secure a role in the 2012 film The Vow. She filmed the project in Toronto alongside Rachel McAdams and Channing Tatum. She described working on the film as a "surreal experience". In 2013, she returned to Packed to the Rafters for the final season as a special guest star. From 2014 to 2015, McNamee starred in the USA Network TV series Sirens. She played the role of Theresa Kelly, a Chicago police officer, and was a main character in the show. In 2017, she portrayed tennis player Margaret Court in Battle of the Sexes.

In 2018, McNamee played the lead role of Jenna alongside William Fichtner in the drama film The Neighbor. She played Lori, the ex-wife of megalodon hunter Jonas Taylor (Jason Statham), in the blockbuster The Meg. In 2019, McNamee appeared in the crime-thriller film Locusts, playing the role of Izzy. In August 2019, McNamee was cast in Mortal Kombat as Sonya Blade and it was released in April 2021.

In 2020, McNamee appeared in the horror film Black Water: Abyss. She also provided voice work in Rhys Wakefield's drama podcast series titled From Now. In 2021, McNamee was cast in the horror-thriller film The Visitor.

In 2024, McNamee appeared in Stan film Windcatcher.

By January 2026, she was cast in the horror film Evil Dead Wrath from director Francis Galluppi.

== Personal life ==
McNamee is the sister of actress Penny McNamee, along with two other sisters and a brother. Her niece is actress Teagan Croft. Her cousin Daniel McNamee is in the band Art Vs Science. In April 2019, she married Patrick Caruso, a property developer.

In February 2010, McNamee became an ambassador for The Fred Hollows Foundation; the foundation focuses on treating and preventing blindness and other vision problems. McNamee represents the foundation's 'Miracle Club', encouraging supporters to make monthly contributions that will restore sight to people in countries where the foundation works.

== Filmography ==
=== Film ===
Year	Title	Role	Notes
2010	The Loved Ones	Mia	
2010	50-50	Nelly Cameron	Short film
2012	The Vow	Gwen Thornton	
2017	CHiPs	Lindsey Taylor	
2017	Battle of the Sexes	Margaret Court	
2018	The Neighbor	Jenna	
2018	The Meg	Lori Taylor	
2019	Locusts	Isabella / Izzy	
2020	Black Water: Abyss	Jennifer / Jen	
2021	Mortal Kombat	Sonya Blade	
2022	The Visitor	Maia Eden	
2024	Windcatcher	Sharon Cobb	
2026	Mortal Kombat II	Sonya Blade	
2028	Evil Dead Wrath	TBA	Post-production

=== Television ===
Year	Title	Role	Notes
2007	Home and Away	Lisa Duffy	32 episodes
2007	Hammer Bay	Amanda Blakely	TV film
2008–2013	Packed to the Rafters	Sammy Rafter	55 episodes
2012	Scruples	Maggie	TV film
2013	White Collar	Penny Chase	Episode: "Shoot the Moon"
2014	The Time of Our Lives	Lisa Montego	4 episodes
2014–2015	Sirens	Theresa Kelly	23 episodes
2019	Into the Dark	Rachel Adams	Episode: "I'm Just F*cking with You"
2022	Upright	Avery Mae	6 episodes
