= Lisa Duffy (Home and Away) =

- Home and Away character
- Portrayed by: Jessica McNamee
- First appearance: 22 January 2007
- Last appearance: 24 August 2007
- Introduced by: Julie McGuaran
In-universe information
- Occupation: Student

Lisa Duffy is a fictional character from the Australian soap opera Home and Away, played by Jessica McNamee. She made her first on-screen appearance on 22 January 2007. The character departed on 24 August 2007.

== Storylines ==
Lisa started dating her schoolmate Drew Curtis at a Hawaiian night held at the surf club. With his ex-girlfriend Belle Taylor now dating Lucas Holden, Drew went out with Lisa to make Belle jealous.

Lisa suspected Drew and Belle still had feelings for each other and gave Drew some time to think about what he wanted. Drew chose to be with Lisa but he was really still in love with Belle.

Lisa was invited to a barbecue at Drew's house, where she tried to have sex with him. They didn't sleep together but Lisa was allowed to stay overnight sleeping on the sofa.

During the hospital ball, Drew admitted he still had feelings for Belle. Lisa was furious and threw a glass of water over him before they broke up.

Belle was worried Lisa would tell her boyfriend Lucas about her feelings for Drew but Lisa promised to keep it a secret. Nevertheless she tried to tell Lucas about Drew and Belle's affair but he did not believe her. The truth finally came out during a school assignment when Lisa showed a photo of Drew and Belle kissing to the whole class.

A while later Lisa started dating Denni, who was involved in illegal drag racing. Lisa and Denni wanted revenge on Drew for the way he'd treated Lisa, so they got him involved in the dangerous drag races.

During this time Lisa bonded with Lucas and they slept together. When Denni found out, he threatened to hurt Lucas. Lisa tried to calm him down but he forced her into his car and drove off in pursuit of Lucas. Lisa grabbed the steering wheel to stop him, causing the car to roll off the road. Lisa suffered a head injury and was taken to the city hospital, where she later died.

A memorial was held on the beach in Lisa's honour, and Lucas devoted some of his novel to Lisa.
