= Trent Dalzell =

Australian actor

- Born: 15 October 1988 (age 38); Wollongong, New South Wales, Australia
- Occupation: Actor
- Years active: 2006–present

Trent Dalzell (born 15 October 1988) is an Australian actor. He is best known for his role as Axel Hay on the Australian soap opera Home and Away. He is also known for playing Corey Petrie during the second season of Blue Water High.

== Filmography ==
=== Film ===
Year	Title	Role	Notes
2010	Legend of the Guardians: The Owls of Ga'Hoole	Various Owls	Voice

=== Television ===
Year	Title	Role	Notes
2005–2008	Home and Away	Axel Hay	
2006	Blue Water High	Corey Petrie	
2007	Dangerous	Jock	2 episodes
