= Belle Taylor =

- Home and Away character
- Portrayed by: Jessica Tovey
- Duration: 2006–2009
- First appearance: 3 February 2006
- Last appearance: 11 August 2009
- Introduced by: Julie McGauran
In-universe information
- Other names: Susan Taylor; Belle Jefferies
- Occupation: Waitress; Journalist; Student
- Mother: Amanda Vale
- Adoptive father: David Taylor
- Adoptive mother: Judith Taylor
- Stepfather: Graham Walters; Peter Baker
- Brothers: Drew Curtis (step)
- Sisters: Beth Hunter (step)
- Half-brothers: Ryan Baker
- Husband: Aden Jefferies (2009)
- Grandmothers: Kitty Landsdowne
- Aunts: Kelli Vale

Belle Taylor is a fictional character from the Australian soap opera Home and Away, played by Jessica Tovey. She made her first appearance during the episode broadcast on 3 February 2006. Belle's storylines included finding her birth mother, a drug addiction, her relationship with Aden Jefferies (Todd Lasance) and being diagnosed with cancer. In 2009, it was announced that Tovey had quit the show and the writers decided to kill off the character. Belle made her last appearance on 11 August 2009.

== Casting ==
Tovey joined Home and Away in 2006 when she was 18. The character of Belle was her first television role. On joining the cast, Tovey said she was "overwhelmed" and found it "daunting". She added "It was hard not to feel intimidated and nervous about joining the cast, this was really my first television role, so it was a huge step".

== Development ==
=== Characterisation ===
Belle is described as being a "cheeky, extroverted young girl". She was full of insecurity from her "disciplined and controlling" upbringing. She craved love and attention from her parents, which they never gave to her. Belle's parents were shocked to discover their daughter was rejecting their conservative lifestyle and hanging out with the wrong crowd. On her character Tovey said "Belle is fantastic, she's sassy and fun with quite a mouth on her! We have also seen a more vulnerable side to Belle with her romance with Aden this year and next year, we will see Belle go on a bit of a downward spiral which is a good challenge as an actor".

=== Introduction ===
Tovey explained that her character comes to Summer Bay shortly after learning that she was adopted, as her birth mother lives nearby. A homeless Belle befriends Ric Dalby (Mark Furze) and he agrees to let her stay in his bedroom, though he keeps her presence a secret from his foster parents, and tells her that someone in the house is sick. Belle is soon discovered by Ric's girlfriend Cassie Turner (Sharni Vinson), who Tovey said is "a bit shocked, as you can imagine!" Ric's foster mother Sally Fletcher (Kate Ritchie) hears them, and Ric and Belle explain everything to her. While Sally is sympathetic, she tells Ric that Belle cannot stay as her husband Flynn Saunders (Joel McIlroy) has cancer. Tovey told an Inside Soap columnist that Ric just tells Belle to go without explaining why, so she "doesn't realise why it's such a big deal" and sneaks back in later on. When she goes to use the bathroom, Belle comes face to face with Flynn and they are both startled, which leads to Belle knocking him down the stairs as she runs away. Tovey said that Belle is so panicked that she does not think to stop and help an unconscious Flynn.

=== Painkiller addiction ===
In 2009, producers used the character to explore painkiller addiction. The storyline meant Tovey had to spend weeks crying and shouting, but she said that she was determined to do a good job and worked hard on the scenes. Tovey revealed that the addiction storyline made a bigger impression on her than any of Belle's other plots. She also stated, "It was very challenging at points but I have to say I was quite relieved when it was over because it was quite exhausting at points". Belle spends weeks lying to cover up her addiction and she becomes "erratic". Her painkiller addiction is discovered by her boyfriend, Aden Jefferies (Todd Lasance), after he gives her a necklace and she sells it to buy more drugs. Tovey told Carolyn Stewart from TV Week that it was "a huge deal" for Belle to give up the necklace to her dealer, but she has nothing else to give him. Nicole Franklin (Tessa James) spots the necklace in a pawnshop and tells Aden, who is heartbroken. Tovey explained, "He's so in love with her, but by pawning the necklace, she's essentially saying that the drugs mean more to her than he does. She might not think that's true, but the fact is she's put her need for drugs before everything else in her life."

When Aden confronts Belle, she denies taking the pills, but he tears the room apart and finds her stash. He then "absolutely loses it" when Belle continues lying to him and storms out. Belle later tells Aden that she will try to get off the drugs, but he know that he cannot be around to witness it, as he went through a similar situation with his alcoholic father. Tovey noted that everything Belle said brought back bad memories for Aden. She also commented that Aden questions everything Belle ever told him and realises that she is no longer the person he fell in love with. A devastated Belle sees that she has pushed him too far and their relationship is over. Tovey said Belle "feels she has nothing left" and that "her whole world seems to be crumbling" because of her addiction. Tovey thought that fans of the couple should be worried as there seemed to be no way to get through the situation, as Belle's addiction had worn them both "down to their bare bones."

=== Departure ===
In April 2009, Tovey announced that she had quit Home and Away. On her decision to leave, Tovey said "I can't stress enough what a hard decision it was and that I nearly changed my mind a few times. I still feel sad about it, but I really just wanted a change". Tovey's final scenes were filmed in the same month and shown on Australian screens in August. Tovey said she found filming her final scenes "heartbreaking", but she said that she was happy with the writers' decision to kill off the character.

== Storylines ==
Shortly after finding out she is adopted, Belle arrives in the Bay to find her birth mother. Ric Dalby finds Belle living rough and he brings her food, he later lets Belle hide out in his bedroom. Ric's foster mother, Sally Fletcher finds Belle and insists that she leaves as her husband, Flynn Saunders is terminally ill. Belle returns a few times and one day she accidentally knocks Flynn down the stairs, which weakens his condition. Belle is caught breaking into Irene Roberts's (Lynne McGranger) car and Irene offers her a room at her house. Belle begins spending time with Ric and she kisses him in front of his girlfriend, Cassie Turner. Ric and Cassie split and Belle and Ric begin dating.

Ric helps Belle in the search for her birth mother and they find Katherine Lansdowne (Geraldine Turner), who turns out to be Belle's grandmother. Kitty tells Belle that her mother is dead, but a few weeks later it is revealed that Amanda Vale (Holly Brisley) is Belle's birth mother. Belle is sad when Ric decides to get back with Cassie. Amanda tries to help Belle win Ric back and relations between mother and daughter thaw. Belle then moves in with Amanda. Belle dates Drew Curtis (Bobby Morley) until Drew suddenly splits up with her for another woman. Amanda tells Belle that she is the other woman and Belle goes back to Irene and starts dating Lucas Holden (Rhys Wakefield). One night, Belle accepts a lift home and is kidnapped by her aunt, Kelli Vale (Alexa Ashton). Peter Baker (Nicholas Bishop) rescues her and relations between Belle and Amanda improve once more. Drew realises that he loves Belle and she still has feelings for him, but she continues to stand by Lucas. Belle mistakenly thinks that Drew slept with Lisa Duffy (Jessica McNamee) and she sleeps with Lucas. Drew and Belle later get back together. Drew splits up with Belle when he finds out that she knew about Kelli's revenge plan on Amanda. Kelli spikes Amanda's drink, but Belle drinks it and collapses. Peter arrests Kelli and Amanda decides to leave town. Belle tries to talk Drew out of drag racing with Lisa and Dom Moran (Sam North), but he does not listen. Dom gets Belle drunk and refuses to let her go, she is rescued by Lisa. Belle is upset when Lisa is later killed during a drag race.

Belle is given a cadetship at the local paper that she was working towards. Dom kidnaps Belle and she tries to convince him to let her go by kissing him. Drew rescues Belle and he accidentally runs Dom over. Dom returns and Belle get him medical help and a reference for a job in The Diner. Belle later forces him to leave town. Drew also leaves after he tells Belle's boss that she quit her job and they argue. Belle is offered a job helping Leah Patterson-Baker (Ada Nicodemou) set up The Den. The business does not last and both Leah and Belle are offered jobs in The Diner.

Belle's new job brings her closer to Aden. While drunk one night, Aden climbs through Belle's bedroom window and she makes him sleep on the floor. However, in the morning, Belle finds Aden in her bed. She initially rebuffs Aden's advances, but they later share a kiss. When Belle wanted to take things further, Aden kept putting her off. Belle goes on a date with Angelo Rosetta (Luke Jacobz), which makes Aden jealous. Aden tells Belle that his grandfather abused him, which made him scared of being intimate with her. After Aden attends counselling, the couple sleep together. Aden and Belle are held hostage and Belle witnesses Aden undergo a breakdown. They are rescued by Angelo and Aden is admitted to psychiatric care, Belle also ends their relationship. She attempts to move on and begins dating Angelo.

A man named Murray Buchanan (Ben Tari) contacts Belle and tells her that the council is in on a plan to build on a toxic waste dump site. Belle attempts to help uncover the truth. She joins a protest against the site and is arrested by Angelo. Belle uncovers a link between the contaminated soil and local cancer cases. The site developers find out she is on to them and they break into the house to steal back plans Aden got for her. Belle asks Angelo to look into Murray's accounts and they discover that thousands of dollars have been paid to him by the council. Belle believes Murray has been paid off. During this time, Aden forces Belle to tell him that she still loves him and they kiss. Belle begins seeing Aden while she is still seeing Angelo. Angelo is attacked and Belle cannot break up with him while he is in hospital. Murray returns and tells Belle that he will help her, but Belle is unsure about trusting him. Belle's car is run off the road and the evidence that the toxic waste site causes cancer is stolen. Angelo finds out about Belle and Aden and publicly humiliates Belle. Aden finds Belle badly beaten and she is taken to hospital, where she names Angelo as her attacker. The Police find no evidence and Belle becomes depressed.

When Belle helps Leah out in the kitchen, Kane Phillips's (Sam Atwell) car hits the building, leaving her trapped and fighting for her life. She is diagnosed with a compression fracture and she becomes paranoid, believing the developers are out to get her. She does not want to leave the hospital, but she eventually goes to Aden's. Belle struggles to cope and turns to painkillers to help her through. Rachel Armstrong (Amy Mathews) refuses to supply her any more painkillers and she looks for other ways to get pills. Belle gets high with Liam Murphy (Axle Whitehead) while she is covering his music concert. Belle is sacked from her job when her boss finds pills in her desk drawer. Aden finds out about Belle's addiction and she decides to go cold turkey on her own, but struggles to cope without Aden. Rachel is unconvinced when Belle says she has recovered. At Rachel's wedding, Belle takes some more pills and collapses. Her stomach is pumped and Rachel insists she goes to rehab. Belle gets clean with the help of Liam.

Belle and Aden get back together and Aden asks Belle to move in with him. Aden decides to propose, so he borrows money from a loan shark to pay for a ring. Belle collapses in pain at the Diner and makes an appointment with Rachel for some tests. Belle is diagnosed with cancer and she decides to keep her condition a secret. Aden is beaten up by the loan shark and he tells Belle about the ring. Belle then surprises Aden by asking him to marry her instead. Belle asks Rachel to help her apply to get married within two weeks. Aden gets the ring and proposes to her properly.

Rachel encourages Belle to tell Aden the truth that she is dying, she resolves to tell Aden the truth after the wedding. Belle is also told that her cancer is spreading quickly. Nicole Franklin (Tessa James) sees Belle taking pills and Belle is forced to tell her about her cancer. Belle refuses, but when she collapses, Nicole tells Aden. Belle worries that Aden will not turn up to the wedding, but he does and they marry. Following the honeymoon, Belle confesses to Nicole that she does not think she has much time left. Belle asks Aden to call Amanda and tell her what was going on. Liam also arrives to apologise for his behaviour when he was on drugs. Amanda refuses to believe that Belle is dying and arranges for a second opinion. On her release from hospital, Belle goes for a walk along the beach. Aden carries her back home and she says goodbye to everyone. During the night, Belle dies peacefully in Aden's arms.

== Reception ==
For her portrayal of Belle, Tovey received a nomination for Most Popular New Female Talent at the 2007 Logie Awards. In 2010, she was nominated for Most Popular Actress. At the 2007 Inside Soap Awards, Tovey was nominated for "Sexiest Female". In 2009, she received a nomination for Best Actress and Best Storyline for the drug addiction plot. 2010 saw Belle and Aden's wedding nominated in the Bride and Doom category at the All About Soap Awards. Belle's funeral episode was nominated for an Australian Writer's Guild Award.

A Daily Record journalist stated "You have to admire Belle, you really do. She might look like a stiff wind would blow her over but it's not every girl who can tolerate being called a skank by her teenage boyfriend and still come back for more, but she did." In April 2009, a reporter from the same paper revealed that they were less than impressed with Belle's painkiller addiction storyline, saying "Misery, thy name is Belle Taylor. Well, it is if you're on about the strung-out journalist. She's spent the past weeks driving us up the wall with her whingeing, while at the same time gobbling any pills she can get her hands on. Thank goodness she got the sack from her job at the paper otherwise who knows how long the storyline would have rumbled on for."

Another writer for the Daily Record commented on Belle's last scenes, noting that she "managed to make it to death's door without losing her looks". They added that "even the most hardened soap cynic" would have been moved to tears when Belle said goodbye to Aden. Ruth Deller of television website Lowculture said she had grown fond of Belle and Aden as a couple in 2009. Virgin Media named Belle and Aden as one of "Soaps' sexiest couples", while viewers voted them "Home and Away's Hottest Couple" in a poll run on the Holy Soap website.
