= Jordan Rodrigues =

Australian actor and dancer

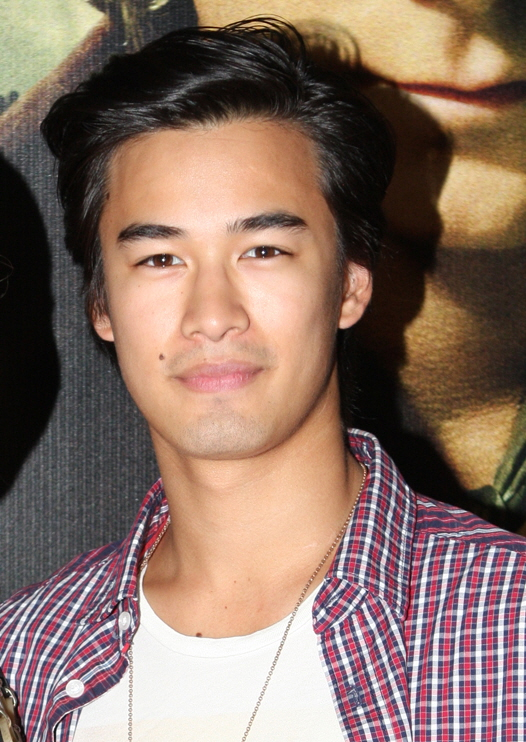
- Rodrigues in December 2012
- Born: Sydney, New South Wales, Australia
- Occupations: Actor, dancer
- Years active: 2003–present

Jordan Rodrigues is an Australian actor and dancer. He is best known for his role as Trey Emory in the Hulu original series Light as a Feather. He has starred and appeared in TV series Dance Academy, Home and Away, and The Fosters, and in the core cast of National Treasure: Edge of History.

== Career ==
Rodrigues's first professional acting experience was when he played the role of the young Simba in The Lion King's Australian tour at the Capitol Theatre starting in October 2003. He had no training prior to the audition but still got the role on stage as one of the lead characters. He performed three times per week for two and a half years.

Rodrigues then trained at Brent Street for over ten years; he has studied jazz, ballet, hip hop, drama and singing.

In January 2008, Rodrigues announced he wanted a career in acting and joined an acting agency. He received several commercial roles and auditioned for the part of Jai Fernandez in Home and Away. He made his debut in March 2008. In 2009, Rodrigues was nominated for a TV Week Silver Logie as Most Popular New Talent after he finished his role as 'Jai Fernandez' on Home and Away.

In mid-2009, he landed a main role in the ABC series Dance Academy. He was cast as one of the main characters, Christian Reed. In 2013, he appeared in the Australian 4-part mini-series Better Man.

From 2014 to 2018, he had a recurring role in the ABC family show The Fosters in the second to fifth season. He portrayed Mat, one of Brandon's bandmates and Mariana's boyfriend. In 2015, he guest starred in an episode on Hawaii Five-0 called "Moʻo ʻolelo Pu". He also starred in film Breaking Through as JJ. In 2017, he appeared in the film Lady Bird as the titular character's older brother.

From 2018, he played Trey Emory, one of the main characters in the Hulu original series Light as a Feather.

== Filmography ==
=== Television ===
| Year | Title | Role | Notes |
|---|---|---|---|
| 2008–2009 | Home and Away | Jai Fernandez | Regular role |
| 2010–2013 | Dance Academy | Christian Reed | Main role |
| 2013 | Camp | Greg | Recurring role |
| 2013 | Better Man | Khoa Nguyen | 4 episodes |
| 2014–2018 | The Fosters | Mat | Recurring role, 38 episodes |
| 2015 | Hawaii Five-0 | Carter Akana | Episode: "Moʻo ʻolelo Pu" |
| 2016 | Faking It | Dylan a.k.a. "Shark Bait" | Recurring role |
| 2018–2019 | Light as a Feather | Trey Emory | Main role |
| 2019 | L.A.'s Finest | Arlo | Recurring role |
| 2022–2023 | National Treasure: Edge of History | Ethan Chao | Main role |

=== Film ===
| Year | Title | Role | Notes |
|---|---|---|---|
| 2015 | Breaking Through | JJ | Film |
| 2017 | Bring It On: Worldwide Cheersmack | Blake | Direct-to-video film |
| 2017 | Lady Bird | Miguel McPherson | Film |
| 2017 | Dance Academy: The Movie | Christian Reed | Film |
| 2020 | Mortal Kombat Legends: Scorpion's Revenge | Liu Kang (voice) | Direct-to-video film |
| 2021 | Mortal Kombat Legends: Battle of the Realms | Liu Kang (voice) | Direct-to-video film |
| 2024 | We're All Gonna Die | Kai | Film |

== Stage ==
| Year | Title | Role | Notes |
|---|---|---|---|
| 2003 | The Lion King | Young Simba | |

== Awards and nominations ==
| Year | Award | Category | Work | Result | Refs |
|---|---|---|---|---|---|
| 2020 | Daytime Emmy Awards | Outstanding Principal Performance in a Daytime Program | Light as a Feather | Nominated | |
