= Celeste Dodwell =

Australian actress

- Education: London Academy of Music and Dramatic Art
- Occupation: Actress
- Years active: 2008–present
- Television: Home and Away
- Father: Grant Dodwell

Celeste Dodwell is an Australian actress. She had a recurring role as Melody Jones on the Australian soap opera Home and Away and has since appeared in a range of film, television and stage roles.

== Early life and education ==
Dodwell was born to A Country Practice actor Grant Dodwell and shoe designer Sian Dodwell, (who worked on the Australian production of Billy Elliot).

She attended Mosman High School in Mosman, New South Wales. She topped the state in drama in her HSC, and at age 18, found out she had scored a role in Home and Away just three days after her final high school exam.

== Career ==
Dodwell joined the soap opera Home and Away as Melody Jones in March 2008. It was reported that she was leaving in 2009 to study drama in London. She graduated from the London Academy of Music and Dramatic Art in 2013. In 2014, she appeared with Felicity Kendal in a UK tour of Hay Fever as Jackie.

In 2016, she appeared in the fifth series of BBC One drama Call the Midwife as Roseanne Dawley, a role in which The Daily Telegraph said Dodwell did "a fine job" of representing a young mother with post-natal depression.

Her film roles have included Allied alongside Brad Pitt, Cyrano with Peter Dinklage and the 2022 Bill Nighy film Living.

In 2022, she appeared as Ursula in Much Ado About Nothing at the National Theatre, London. On 8 September 2022, the production was filmed and broadcast live for cinemas. That year, she also appeared as Joanne in season three of Atlanta.

In 2023, Dodwell could be seen in Paramount+ thriller The Castaways alongside Sheridan Smith. That year, she was also cast in the second series of The Lord of the Rings: The Rings of Power for Amazon Prime Video.

== Filmography ==
=== Film ===
Year	Title	Role	Notes
2010	The Filmmaker	Sally	Short film
2012	Careless Love	Imogen	
2014	The Sun Stands Still	Alice	Short film
2016	Allied	Scarlett	
2021	Cyrano	Theatre lady	
2022	Living	Mrs. Matthews	
2022	National Theatre Live: Much Ado About Nothing	Ursula	

=== Television ===
Year	Title	Role	Notes
2008	Double Trouble	Sasha's friend (uncredited)	Episodes 6, 7 & 11
2008–2009	Home and Away	Melody Jones	61 episodes
2015	The Musketeers	Prostitute	Season 2, episodes 3 & 4: "The Good Traitor" and "Emilie"
2016	Call the Midwife	Roseanne Dawley	Season 5, episode 5
2018	Endeavour	Anoushka Nolan	Season 5, episode 3: "Passenger"
2018	Urban Myths	Nancy Neele	Season 2, episode 6: "Agatha Christie"
2020	Sick of It	Sales Person	Season 2, episode 2: "The Ensuite"
2022	Atlanta	Joanne	Season 3, episode 3: "The Old Man and the Tree"
2023	The Castaways	Natasha	Episodes 1–5
2024	The Lord of the Rings: The Rings of Power	Elf Artisan	Season 2, episodes 1 & 2

== Theatre ==
Year	Title	Role	Notes
2009	The Crucible	Betty Parris	Wharf Theatre, Sydney with STC
2010	As You Like It	Celia	Cleveland Street Theatre, Sydney
2010	Three Sisters	Natasha	ATYP Studio, Wharf Theatre, Sydney with Cry Havoc
2014–2015	Hay Fever	Jackie Coryton	Theatre Royal, Bath, Duke of York's Theatre, London
2017	An Octoroon	Dora	Orange Tree Theatre, London
2022	Much Ado About Nothing	Ursula	National Theatre, London
