= List of Home and Away characters introduced in 2005 =

Home and Away is an Australian soap opera. The following is a list of characters that first appeared in 2005, by order of appearance. They were all introduced by the show's series producer Julie McGuaran. The 18th season of Home and Away began airing on the Seven Network on 10 January 2005. The first introduction of year was Emily Perry as Eve Jacobsen. Isaac Gorman arrived as Ryan Baker in March as did Sharni Vinson as Cassie Turner. Doug Scroope began playing Graham Walters in April. Ryan's mother, Amanda Vale, played by Holly Brisley debuted in June. Todd Lasance began playing Aden Jefferies in August and The Holden family consisting of widower Tony (Jon Sivewright) and his two sons Jack (Paul O'Brien) and Lucas (Rhys Wakefield) arrived in the same month. James Mitchell began playing Jonah Abraham and Linden Wilkinson joined the serial as Mumma Rose in November.

== Eve Jacobsen ==
Eve Jacobsen
- Home and Away character
- Portrayed by: Emily Perry
- Duration: 2005–2006
- First appearance: 21 January 2005
- Last appearance: 19 June 2006
- Introduced by: Julie McGuaran
In-universe information
- Other names: Zoe McCallister
- Occupation: Psychiatric Nurse; Nurse
- Grandmothers: Moya Jacobsen

Eve Jacobsen (also Zoe McCallister), played by Emily Perry, made her first appearance on 21 January 2005. Perry's casting was publicised in the 25–31 December 2004 issue of TV Week. She had previously appeared in Home and Away as an extra. One of the magazine's writers thought the regular role of nurse Zoe would prove to be Perry's "biggest break yet." Of her casting, she stated "When I read for Zoe and saw the character breakdown, I just had to have the role. It will be a lot of fun playing her."

Eve works as a nurse at a Psychiatric Institution and falls for one of her patients Sarah Lewis (Luisa Hastings-Edge). When Sarah's boyfriend, Felix Walters (Josh Lawson) dies of crystal meth overdose administered by Sarah, which she believes to be the result of a beating, she asks Eve to help her escape to get revenge. Sarah later shoots Noah Lawson (Beau Brady) dead before turning the gun on herself. Eve decides to take revenge on Summer Bay. She starts by murdering new Northern Districts hospital nurse Zoe McCallister and burning her body in a bushfire, before assuming her identity.

Eve then sets Noah's place alight, with his widow, Hayley (Bec Cartwright) still inside and plans further destruction by sabotaging a seaplane flight in order to kill the group on board but is only successfully in killing Benny Barron (Colin Borgonon), the pilot. She then frames Marc Edwards (Christopher Hobbs) for her crimes and begins targeting Sally Fletcher (Kate Ritchie) after she refers to Sarah as a psycho. Eve tries to kill Sally on two occasions but fails.

After a bomb threat at a murder mystery party is nullified, Marc is released on bail and works out that Eve is the stalker but she hits him over the head with a crowbar several times, killing him and then frames him once more. Eve continues playing more psychotic games by threatening another attack at the "Miss Groper" beauty pageant but she is only toying with the police. Detective Peter Baker (Nicholas Bishop) becomes convinced that Eve is Sarah returned from the dead and there is a confrontation at an abattoir. She begins playing further games with Peter and kidnaps Sally. Sally is rescued by the police before the building where she is held explodes with Eve inside.

Eve is later revealed to be alive and the body was that of Laura McPhearson, who disappeared on the same day Eve supposedly died. She continues baiting Peter and targets his apartment complex by moving in and assuming the identity of "Maxine Trood" (an anagram of "I Am Next Door"). She stages a bomb threat at the complex, forcing the area to be evacuated but it is only an alarm clock going off. Eve then sends a videotape to Jack Holden (Paul O'Brien) and Martha MacKenzie's (Jodi Gordon) engagement party and Peter is rattled. He solves the anagram but is still one step behind Eve. Peter receives an email telling him to arrive at the abandoned abattoir alone and he comes face to face with Eve but she overpowers him and tells him how she escaped the fire. Jack arrives on the scene and tackles Eve but she gets away. Peter and Jack separate in order to find her but Eve holds Jack over a balcony three stories above. Peter agrees to offer himself in exchange while Tracey Thompson (Sarah Enright) and several others circle behind and apprehend Eve. At the station, Peter tells her he has won but when he leaves the room she smirks, plotting revenge. Eve reappears at Jack and Martha's wedding and takes Tracey hostage and Peter bargains with her in the same manner he did for Jack, but Tracey reveals she is Eve's accomplice. Eve once more declares that she's about to get revenge against all of Summer Bay, only to realize too late that the room they're in has been filled with gas from an open gas bottle, and even worse, a waitress holding a cake with sparklers has walked in. A gas explosion occurs, and Eve and Tracey are killed instantly, becoming the first fatal casualties of the explosion.

The Summer Bay Stalker storyline featuring Eve was nominated for "Best Storyline" at the 2006 Inside Soap Awards. Eve ruining Jack and Martha's wedding day was nominated for "Best Storyline" at the 2007 Inside Soap Awards. Eve also featured as part of Digital Spy's Serial Killer Poll in 2012. Michael Idato of the Sydney Morning Herald hailed Eve's campaign of Terror against the Bay as "the storyline of the moment, discussed everywhere from the office canteen to the corridors of power." On Eve's revelation as the Summer Bay stalker, He opined "Of course, we knew all along. The clue? She was the only suspect not in the show's opening titles. Haven't you learnt your lessons? It's always the guest star." An Inside Soap reporter branded Eve plotting to blow up the murder mystery party a "bonkers – but nonetheless brilliant" storyline.

== Ryan Baker ==
Ryan Baker
- Home and Away character
- Portrayed by: Isaac Gorman
- Duration: 2005–2009
- First appearance: 16 March 2005
- Last appearance: 11 August 2009
- Introduced by: Julie McGuaran (2005); Cameron Welsh (2008, 2009)
In-universe information
- Occupation: Student
- Father: Dan Baker
- Mother: Amanda Vale
- Stepfather: Graham Walters
- Stepmother: Leah Patterson-Baker
- Brothers: VJ Patterson (step)
- Sisters: Beth Hunter (step)
- Half-sisters: Belle Taylor
- Grandfathers: Kevin Baker
- Grandmothers: Noelene Baker; Kitty Landsdowne
- Uncles: Peter Baker
- Aunts: Kelli Vale
- First cousins: Drew Curtis

Ryan Baker, played by Isaac Gorman, first appeared on 16 March 2005 and departed in 2007. He made guest returns in 2008 and 2009. Gorman previously guested on the serial as Riley Edwards in 2002.

Ryan arrives ahead of his father Dan's (Tim Campbell) wedding to Leah Patterson (Ada Nicodemou). He is pleasant to Leah in front of Dan but later makes his dislike of her known. He spills a drink on Leah and is frequently rude to her. Dan, oblivious to this, argues with Leah when she sends Ryan to his room. Ryan then fakes illness to stop Dan and Leah shopping for rings and is quickly exposed by Leah. As revenge, Ryan destroys Leah's wedding dress. The final straw for Ryan's bad behaviour comes when he burns the invitations after learning his mother Amanda Vale (Holly Brisley) is not invited. Leah's son VJ (Nicholas and Cameron Stevens) puts his hand in the ashes and burns himself. VJ's burns are mild but both Dan and Leah are furious with Ryan. He then packs his bags and runs away but is found on the wharf by his uncle Peter (Nicholas Bishop) who tells him Dan and Amanda will not be getting back together. Ryan then apologises to Dan and Leah and replaces the wedding invitations before returning to Amanda in America. Ryan returns for the wedding as a ring bearer.

Dan later decides Amanda is a bad influence on Ryan and has him move with him and Leah. However, after an argument with Dan, Amanda takes Ryan back to Los Angeles. Amanda returns with Ryan several months later and they settle in the bay into a mansion. They are joined by Belle Taylor (Jessica Tovey), Amanda's long-lost daughter and Ryan's half-sister. Ryan is happy when Amanda and Peter get engaged but after the marriage encounters difficulties he returns to live with Dan and Leah. Peter and Amanda reconcile and relocate to the city but Ryan remains with Dan and Leah. Dan gets a job in America and is keen for the whole family to move but Ryan makes it clear he does not want to leave and begins misbehaving. He admits he misses Amanda so Dan takes him to the city to live with her and Peter. When Dan dies in an abseiling accident while in America, Amanda and Ryan return for his memorial service. Ryan worries that Leah and VJ will not see him as part of their family but Leah reassures him that he always will be. Ryan and Amanda return for Belle's wedding to Aden Jefferies (Todd Lasance) and for Belle's last few hours before her death of cancer. They attend her funeral before returning home to the city.

For his portrayal of Ryan, Gorman was nominated for Best Young Actor at the 2006 Inside Soap Awards.

== Cassie Turner ==
Cassie Turner, played by Sharni Vinson, debuted on-screen during the episode broadcast on 18 March 2005 and departed on 2 April 2008. Vinson previously appeared in 2001 and 2003, as guest characters named Tonya and Summer respectively. In 2004, Vinson's agent submitted her to audition for the role of Martha MacKenzie. Vinson received a re-call for the role and was also handed scripts for another character, Cassie Turner. However, fellow actress Jodi Gordon went on to secure the role of Martha. In July 2007, media outlets reported that Vinson wanted to quit the serial in order to pursue other projects in Los Angeles. That November, it was confirmed that Vinson had quit Home and Away so she could move to Los Angeles to be with her boyfriend. However, the serial refused to comment on her departure because Cassie would still be seen on-screen into 2008. Cassie has been described as having a "fiercely independent and headstrong" persona. While she is able to learn from her mistakes and has a knack when it comes to "winning friends and influencing people". For her portrayal of Cassie, Vinson as nominated in the category of "Most Popular New Female Talent" at the 2006 Logie Awards. A columnist for the Sunday Mirror said that Cassie "set pulses racing" and branded her a "sexy soap siren". They also opined that Vinson herself was a "sexy Home & Away starlet" and that her departure was "bad news" and "disappointing" for men who watch the serial.

== Graham Walters ==
Graham Walters
- Home and Away character
- Portrayed by: Doug Scroope
- Duration: 2005–06
- First appearance: 22 April 2005
- Last appearance: 3 March 2006
- Introduced by: Julie McGuaran
In-universe information
- Occupation: Farmer
- Wife: Amanda Vale (2005–06)
- Daughters: Beth Hunter
- Stepsons: Ryan Baker
- Stepdaughters: Belle Taylor
- Grandsons: Scott Hunter; Robbie Hunter; Henry Hunter
- Granddaughters: Kit Hunter; Matilda Hunter

Graham Walters, played by Doug Scroope, made his first appearance on 22 April 2005 and departed following the character's death on 3 March 2006

Graeme arrives in Summer Bay for his grandson Robbie Hunter's (Jason Smith) 18th birthday. There is some visible tension between him and his daughter Beth (Clarissa House). Beth confronts Graham about his distant and aloof behaviour. He breaks down explaining that he had been deeply effected by his time in the Vietnam War and was left too scared to be close to anyone. He later sells his farm and attempts to build bridges with his daughter and grandchildren. Graham becomes attracted to the much younger Amanda Vale (Holly Brisley) (who previously dated his grandson Scott (Kip Gamblin). Amanda seduces him much to his family's disgust and he moves in with her. Beth voices her disapproval but Graham and Amanda marry much to the shock of the Bay.

It becomes clear Amanda is using Graham but he refuses to believe it but after she repeatedly makes excuses to avoid consummating the marriage and frequently dumping her son Ryan Baker (Isaac Gorman) on him he begins to see the light. Graham later discovers Amanda is seeing Josh West) (Daniel Collopy) and confronts her about it. He then enlists Morag Bellingham's (Cornelia Frances) help in exposing Josh's illegal Project 56. He confronts Amanda about it but suffers a heart attack in the process. Amanda phones for the ambulance but ultimately leaves Graham to die. He is rushed to hospital and pronounced brain dead. Amanda and Graham's family battle over switching off the life support machine. Robbie takes matters into his own hands and turns off the machine, ending Graham's life. Amanda inherits Graham's estate and holds a wake for him which people snub in favour of the Hunter family. Amanda later returns Graham's war medals to Beth and after Robbie confesses to turning the machine off, he stands trial and is found Guilty but is not imprisoned.

== Diesel Williams ==
Diesel Williams
- Home and Away character
- Portrayed by: Marcus Jacometti
- First appearance: 9 May 2005
- Last appearance: 17 June 2005
- Introduced by: Julie McGuaran

Diesel Williams, played by Marcus Jacommeti, made his first appearance on 9 May 2005 and departed on 17 June 2005.

Diesel was Jacommetti's first acting role after completing Year 12 and he signed to the series for 20 episodes. In order to secure the role of Diesel, Jacometti had to commute from his hometown of Kingston, Tasmania to Sydney. He described his experience in an interview with a reporter from the Hobart Mercury; "It's the most awesome feeling, I find it hard watching myself on TV so far but I couldn't have asked for a better start. I was new to Sydney and I was driving around getting totally lost before the audition and I was running late". Jacommeti experienced nerves when first dealing with his fame; "A bus driver said 'hey, I know you, you're Diesel' and I just slunk out of there and caught another bus. It's weird, amazing." He described his castmates as being sincere and helpful. Jacometti talked about his character; "He falls in love with the wrong people, causes a bit of trouble and then gets out of there, I don't think we're alike but maybe his core is similar to mine."

Diesel arrives at Summer Bay High and is introduced to Sally Fletcher (Kate Ritchie) by principal Barry Hyde (Ivar Kants). His unconventional dress sense makes him a target for bully Jason Pappa (Joshua Biagi) and his friends who begin picking on him and when they discover he has a rose tattoo they assume he is gay. In order to dispel the rumours about his sexuality, Diesel begins dating Matilda Hunter (Indiana Evans) who is attracted with him. However, he tells Cassie Turner (Sharni Vinson) he is not interested in Matilda romantically. Jason sees through the smokescreen and continues to taunt Diesel and beats him up.

Sally offers to tutor Diesel and makes excuses as to why she cannot go over to his house. It is revealed Diesel is living rough after falling out with his foster parents and Sally invites him to live with her and her husband Flynn Saunders (Joel McIlroy) who is reluctant to have Diesel there. Diesel and Flynn do not get along. After Diesel reveals to Sally it is his mother's birthday and he used to take her for a meal, she agrees to go a restaurant with him much to Flynn's unease. Diesel moves out after Flynn lines up accommodation at a hostel.

Henry Hunter (Tobi Atkins) finds Diesel with a photo of Sally and Diesel tells him they are having an affair. During a tutoring session, Diesel kisses Sally, which is witnessed by Dan Baker (Tim Campbell). Sally rejects Diesel and he burns a sketch he drew of her. Diesel begins acting up in class and later alleges Sally has been sexually harassing him. The Allegations are soon all over town and Sally is suspended as a result. Ric Dalby (Mark Furze) and Cassie try to get Diesel to drop the allegations but it only exacerbates the situation. He tells Sally he will drop the complaint if she admits she loves him.

Diesel steals Sally's locket containing a photo of her and Flynn and fakes some emails allegedly from Sally to him. Carl Summons (John O'Hare), an investigator from the Education department interviews Diesel and he shows him the emails. When Carl asks Sally to show him her locket, a photo of Diesel is found and Sally is stood down from her position at the school. Barry threatens to make life difficult for Diesel if he does not admit the truth. Sally comes home to find Diesel holding her baby daughter Pippa hostage and threatens to harm her if Sally does not admit she loves him. Sally tries reasoning with him and he allows her to take a call from Flynn, who is alerted to the danger. Diesel works out what is going on and he tries to flee with Pippa but Flynn tackles him and Diesel is arrested. He confesses to Ken Harper (Mark McCann) about falsifying the allegations and framing Sally. Sally visits him and he tells her she reminds him of his mother. She tells him she knows what it is like to lose a parent but having an unhealthy fixation on someone is unacceptable. Diesel apologises and is taken away for psychiatric care.

== Amanda Vale ==
Amanda Vale, played by Holly Brisley, made her first on-screen appearance on 30 June 2005 and departed in 2007. The character returned for a brief guest appearances in 2008 and 2009. Brisley reprised her role of Amanda in October 2007. She said "My character only moved to the city so she can flit in and flit out". In June 2009, it was announced that Brisley would be returning to Home and Away to take part in a secretive storyline. Brisley's real-life pregnancy was written into the scripts. Amanda is described as the "ultimate attention-seeker", who manipulates people to get what she wants. For her portrayal of Amanda, Brisley was nominated in the "Best Bitch" category at the 2007 Inside Soap Awards.

== Aden Jefferies ==
Aden Jefferies, played by Todd Lasance, debuted on-screen during the episode airing on 4 August 2005. Aden was introduced as a recurring character and as part of Cassie Turner's (Sharni Vinson) storylines. Lasance was offered the role after previously auditioning for a separate character. In 2007, Lasance was asked to return on another guest contract, though was promoted to the regular cast soon after. In 2005, Lasance auditioned for the role of Jack Holden; however, actor Paul O'Brien secured the role. The serial's producers called Lasance back, offering him the part of Aden, in a guest capacity Aden was brought into the serial to play a part of Cassie Turner's (Sharni Vinson) storylines. Lasance had not previously watched the serial, but upon learning of his part he said he watched it "religiously" and carried out research on the net. In April 2007, The Newcastle Herald announced that Lasance would return to filming with Home and Away. In August 2009, TV Week reported that Lasance had quit Home and Away to pursue a career overseas when he signed with a Los Angeles talent agency. However, a spokesperson for the serial said there were no immediate plans for Lasance to be written out. His official departure was later made public and he filmed his final scenes on 15 January 2010. When Lasance returned to the serial in 2007, he described Aden as being "an absolute bad-arse". Lasance said that he did not want Aden to turn into a "good guy". Lasance was nominated in the category of "Best Bad Boy" at the 2008 Inside Soap Awards. Lasance won the award for "Most Popular Actor" at the 2009 Logie Awards, for his portrayal of Aden. He was nominated in the same category at the 2010 ceremony.

== Jack Holden ==
Jack Holden, played by Paul O'Brien, made his first on-screen appearance on 5 August 2005 and departed on 28 November 2008. O'Brien earned various awards nominations for his portrayal of Jack. In 2006, O'Brien won a Logie Award for "Most Popular New Male Talent". The 2007 and 2008 ceremonies saw O'Brien nominated for "Most Popular Actor". At the 2007 Inside Soap Awards, O'Brien and co-star Jodi Gordon were nominated for "Best Storyline" for Jack and Martha's wedding day. The following year, O'Brien was nominated for "Best Actor", "Sexiest Male" and "Best Couple" with Gordon. At the first Digital Spy Soap Awards, O'Brien was nominated for "Best On-Screen Partnership" with Gordon.

== Tony Holden ==
Tony Holden, played by Jon Sivewright, made his debut on-screen appearance during the episode broadcast on 5 August 2005 and departed on 11 August 2010. As of 2010 Sivewright was the joint second longest-serving current male cast member in the serial. In February 2010, it was announced that Sivewright was being written out of the serial following the departure of his co-star Amy Mathews. Tony's storylines have focused on his grief on losing his wife, girlfriend and child, he is described as a "family man" who puts them first. As of 2010 Sivewright was the joint-second longest serving male cast member. That year his co-star Mathews who plays on-screen wife Rachel Armstrong had quit the serial to pursue other projects and it was revealed that producers decided that it was the right time to write out Sivewright's character. The serial's official website describe Tony as suffering "great loss" throughout his life. They describe his persona stating: "Tony has great compassion and empathy for others, yet always looks at the big picture with a positive perspective on things." "Tony likes to keep fit, but does not mind a beer with the boys.." Holy Soap recall Tony's most memorable scenes as being when he reversed his vasectomy so Rachel and he could have kids.

== Lucas Holden ==
Lucas Holden, played by Rhys Wakefield, made his first appearance on 5 August 2005 and departed on 14 February 2008. For his portrayal of Lucas, Wakefield was nominated for Most Popular New Male Talent at the 2006 Logie Awards. Of the character, a reporter for the Evening Chronicle said "Lucas is one of those teenagers who, when he sulks, looks like he's been sucking lemons for a week." The reporter added that Lucas was a "stroppy lad" and that when Tony told him to shut up, it was "a beautiful moment". In October 2007, Home and Away and the Seven Network were rapped by the ACMA for broadcasting "raunchy scenes" in G-rated episodes, following complaints from viewers. One such episode was 4358, which aired on 21 February 2007, and featured Belle and Lucas's decision to have sex. Some scenes shown saw the couple in bed together as they discussed what had happened between them. The regulator said "ACMA found that verbal references to sex and visual depictions of sexual behaviour contained in the episode were not brief or infrequent. It also considered that the programme's treatment of the theme of teenage sexuality was not very mild in impact. ACMA therefore determined that Seven incorrectly classified the programme G, and that it breached the code in relation to this broadcast."

== Michael Abraham ==
Michael Abraham
- Home and Away character
- Portrayed by: James Mitchell
- Duration: 2005–2007
- First appearance: 4 November 2005
- Last appearance: 29 November 2007
- Introduced by: Julie McGuaran (2005); Cameron Welsh (2007)
In-universe information
- Other names: Jonah Abraham
- Occupation: Farmer
- Adoptive mother: Mumma Rose

Michael "Jonah" Abraham, played by James Mitchell, first appeared on 4 November 2005.

Mitchell joined the serial after graduating from NIDA in 2004. In spite of Early starts, he relished the opportunity and enjoyed the experience. "It was great, just to be working and to be part of it," he told Vince Ciccarello of the University of South Australia's publication, The Graduate. "Everyone involved is so dedicated to the craft. And they work so hard."

Jonah is the son of Mumma Rose (Linden Wilkinson), the head of a cult called "The Believers". The Believers influence Tasha Andrews (Isabel Lucas) into joining them. Mumma Rose believes that Tasha is the chosen one who is destined to have Jonah's baby and arranges for Jonah to impregnate her. He goes along with his mother's plans and kidnaps Tasha's friend Martha MacKenzie (Jodi Gordon) to prevent her from informing Tasha. Tasha is drugged and it is believed Jonah has raped her. Jonah rebels against his mother's beliefs and tries to flee with Tasha but they are caught by the group. The police eventually rescue them and arrest Mumma Rose and Jonah and imprison them.

The following year, Jonah is paroled and returns to Summer Bay under his birth name, Michael. It is revealed that Mumma Rose had adopted him at age five and named him Jonah, after her son who died in a car accident. Mumma Rose had been drugging and brainwashing Jonah all his life. The discovery of his sterility clears him of being Tasha's rapist as well as being drugged that night. Martha and Irene Roberts (Lynne McGranger) refuse to listen to him and try to drive him out of town. After selling the land the Believers previously lived on, he begins working for Bruce Campbell (Chris Haywood) as a farmhand. Martha spray paints "Evil" on Michael's van and he chases after her, but they fall into a mineshaft, forcing them to be trapped for the night. After the rescue, Martha denies her feelings and dates Lewis Rigg (Luke Carroll) but later kisses Michael and they sleep together.

Michael and Martha's relationship is not accepted at first but Michael proves himself to her. There are testing times for the relationship when Martha wrestles with her feelings for her ex-husband Jack Holden (Paul O'Brien), who is now engaged to Sam Tolhurst (Jessica Chapnik). Michael's jealousy gets the best of him and he violently punches Jack one day. In spite of this, Martha agrees to leave town with Michael but he ends up leaving alone after he realises he will only be second best to Jack.

== Mumma Rose ==
Mumma Rose
- Home and Away character
- Portrayed by: Linden Wilkinson
- Duration: 2005–06
- First appearance: 17 November 2005
- Last appearance: 3 October 2006
- Introduced by: Julie McGuaran
In-universe information
- Other names: Florence White; Mumma Lily
- Occupation: Cult leader
- Sons: Jonah White
- Adoptive sons: Michael Abraham

Mumma Rose (real name Florence White), played by Linden Wilkinson, made her first appearance on 17 November 2005. The actress was in the show once, played a former character, Katherine Walker in 1996.

In an interview with The Sunday Times, Catholic Priest Toby Sherring spoke out against Several of the serial's storylines involving religion, including one where Mumma Rose convinces Tasha Andrews (Isabel Lucas) to join her cult the Believers. Sherring said: "Sometimes it is assumed that all churches operate like cults, who will steal away naive teenagers from their families, brainwash them with strange ideas and involve them in strange suicide pacts, or send them knocking on people's doors with predictions about the end of the world." He added: "Because religion in TV shows such as Home and Away is portrayed in this way, the media version is firstly more believable and secondly much more intriguing, although ultimately unappealing."

Mumma Rose is the leader of a cult called The Believers. She has her son, Jonah Abraham (James Mitchell), convince Tasha Andrews to join the group. Tasha's friends are sceptical about The Believers but she refuses to listen. Tasha's boyfriend, Robbie Hunter (Jason Smith), tries to get her to see sense but he is pushed into a river by Mumma Rose who delays the search by stealing Tasha's mobile, so she cannot call her friends. Robbie is found but unable to prove he had been pushed.

When Rebecca Tate (Janneke Arent) tries to warn Robbie about Mumma Rose's plans to make Tasha "The Chosen One" to carry Jonah's baby, Mumma Rose has her kidnapped and denies everything when the police arrive at the commune asking questions. Martha MacKenzie (Jodi Gordon) tells Mumma Rose she wants to join the Believers, a ruse in order to rescue Tasha. Martha's rescue attempt is foiled when she is spotted near the hatcher where Rebecca is held. Martha escapes but is unable to prove any evidence of the Believers taking Rebecca.

Mumma Rose engineers a plan for Jonah to impregnate Tasha by drugging them both. Neither have any recollection of the night before. When Jonah helps Tasha escape, they are captured and Mumma Rose arranges for a purification ceremony for Jonah and Tasha which involves the use of fire. Tasha quickly manages to turn the group against Mumma Rose by reminding them she is the chosen one and they attack her. The police arrive and arrest the believers but Mumma Rose flees into the night in a hidden car.

Some months later, Mumma Rose returns and tries various attempts to get Tasha back in her clutches but they fail. She manages to corner her and holds her and Martha hostage. Tasha is then taken to a remote location where Mumma Rose tries to get her to induce labour. Tasha tells her if she does not have a caesarean, the baby will die. Mumma Rose then arranges for Rachel Armstrong (Amy Mathews) to be kidnapped and threatens to cut Tasha open herself if she does not comply. Rachel tries to inject Mumma Rose with a sedative but gets Tasha instead. The police receive a tip-off from Nurse Julie Cooper (Lisa Hayson-Phillips) and Mumma Rose is arrested.

Mumma Rose escapes with the help of Charity Fernbrook (Charlotte Gregg) and snatches Tasha's newborn daughter, Ella Hunter, and plans to cleanse the infant with fire. She is foiled when Charity has a change of heart and calls the police, who are followed by Tasha, Robbie, Martha and Irene Roberts (Lynne McGranger). A hostage situation occurs and Mumma Rose demands to talk to Tasha, who agrees to meet her. She then locks them all in the room. When officers Jack Holden (Paul O'Brien) and Lara Fitzgerald (Rebecca George) try to enter the room, a struggle ensues between Tasha and Mumma Rose, resulting in the latter falling out of the window clinging the ledge. Jack and Fitzy pull her to safety and arrest her. Mumma Rose is then admitted to a secure psychiatric facility.

A writer from the Daily Record described Mumma Rose as "sinister".

== Others ==
Date(s)	Character	Actor	Circumstances
11 January–31 March	Greg Hill	Alex Sideratos	Greg is a doctor at Northern Districts hospital. He attends to Leah Patterson (Ada Nicodemou) after her appendix ruptures and attends to Sally Fletcher (Kate Ritchie) after she suffers a fall and treats her for a blood clot on the brain after she is readmitted.
13–28 January	Gus Phillips	Peter Lamb	Gus is Kane Phillips' (Sam Atwell) estranged father. Kane refuses to have anything to do with him as Gus and his brother Scott (Nathaniel Dean; Josh Rosenthal) physically abused him in his youth but his wife Kirsty (Christie Hayes) suggests he gives Gus another chance and he does. He saves Hayley Lawson (Bec Cartwright) from a house fire. It is later revealed Gus is in debt of $3000 to Greg Harvey (Steve Vella). He feigns leaving town but returns and tells Kane he is in trouble and when Kane comes to his aid he discovers some money from a robbery and is furious. During police pursuit, Kane throws Gus out of the car telling him he never wants to see him again. Gus then flees into the night but not before leaving the money and the gun in the car, resulting in Kane's arrest.
14 January–1 April	Marc Edwards	Christopher Hobbs	Marc arrives in Summer Bay in the aftermath of the bushfire. He reunites with Josie Russell (Laurie Foell), an old school friend and helps clear up the scrub land and discovers the burned remains of Zoe McCallister. Marc later sleeps with Josie, aware she is dating Jesse McGregor (Ben Unwin). Josie rejects Marc but he continues to haunt her and blackmails her into giving him $20,000 to prevent him from disclosing information about her history as a brothel madam and the suspicious death of one of her clients. He takes the money but continues to hang around Summer Bay and continues hounding Josie. The truth is revealed when video evidence of Marc and Josie arguing is played on Josie and Jesse's wedding day. Eve Jacobsen (Emily Perry), posing as Zoe, confronts Marc and tries to frame him for attacking her and he is arrested. When Mark is bailed, he goes to a murder mystery event and demands for Josie to reveal who framed him. Eve then attacks Marc with a crowbar, killing him and frames him for a bomb she has planted.
18 January–1 March	Anna McMann	Andrea Moor	Anna is an Administrator at Northern Districts Hospital. She is unimpressed when Flynn Saunders (Joel McIlroy) botches an operation on Leah Patterson (Ada Nicodemou) and suspends his surgical rights and forces him to work shifts. However, Anna praises him when he successfully operates on Tasha Andrews (Isabel Lucas). She later reinstates Flynn.
26 January–23 February	Greg Harvey	Steve Vella	Greg is a criminal associate of Gus Phillips (Peter Lamb). He visits Gus after his release from prison and demands $3000 from the last the job he did. Gus tells Greg the money was seized when he was arrested and asks him to wait until he's a got a job to save the money. Greg then threatens to hurt Gus' son Kane (Sam Atwell). When Kane is framed for the robbery, Greg gives evidence against him in court but when Kane's lawyer Morag Bellingham (Cornelia Frances) points out that Greg was fifty metres from the crime scene and shows him a photo of Gus, Greg concedes it may have been him that he saw.
26 January–12 September 2008	Lara Fitzgerald	Rebecca George	Lara is a constable at Yabbie Creek Police station. She arrests Kane Phillips' (Sam Atwell) for a crime his father Gus (Peter Lamb) commits and is frequently paired with Jack Holden (Paul O'Brien) on various assignments over the years. Fitzy takes maternity leave in 2008, naming Charlie Buckton (Esther Anderson) as her successor as Senior Constable. When Jack is killed, Fitzy writes a eulogy for him but is unable to attend the funeral as she goes into labour.
4–7 February	Benny "Red" Barron	Colin Borgonon	Benny is the pilot of a charter flight which Leah Patterson (Ada Nicodemou, Dan Baker (Tim Campbell), Colleen Smart (Lyn Collingwood, Hayley Lawson (Bec Cartwright), Kim Hyde (Chris Hemsworth) and Tasha Andrews (Isabel Lucas) board. The plane crashes and Benny is killed as a result of his injuries.
17–25 February	Arthur Gordon	Alan McGuiness	Arthur meets Colleen Smart (Lyn Collingwood) via an Internet dating website. It transpires that Arthur is a journalist for the local paper and is only using Colleen to gain information on the Summer Bay Stalker and is dumped as a result.
3–25 March	Lisa Stanniford	Zoe Tuckwell-Smith	Lisa meets Scott Hunter (Kip Gamblin) at a bar. They begin seeing each other but Scott's ex-girlfriend Hayley Lawson (Bec Cartwright) overhears one of Lisa's telephone conversation, she is suspicious of her. At a meal, Hayley looks through Lisa's phone and discovers a text message from Lisa's husband, Alan (Don Atkinson), who tells her he and the children miss her. Hayley confronts Lisa and she begs her not to tell Scott. When Alan arrives, Hayley witnesses him kiss Lisa and tells Scott that Lisa married. Lisa tells Scott she and Alan have been separated for a year and he puts Hayley's story down to jealousy. Scott announces he wants to move to the city with Lisa but she decides to tell Scott the truth and offers to leave Alan for him but Lisa leaves town alone.
7 March 2005 – 15 February 2017, 6 February 2020	Celebrant Claire	Mary Regan	A local celebrant who presides over the ill-fated wedding of Jesse McGregor (Ben Unwin) and Josie Russell (Laurie Foell). She later conducts the weddings of Dan Baker (Tim Campbell) and Leah Patterson (Ada Nicodemou) and Belle Taylor (Jessica Tovey) and Aden Jefferies (Todd Lasance). Claire also conducts Danny Braxton's (Andy McPhee) funeral. The celebrant conducts the wedding of Heath Braxton (Dan Ewing) and Bianca Scott (Lisa Gormley) in 2013 and the wedding of John Palmer (Shane Withington) and Marilyn Chambers (Emily Symons) in 2014, and their vow renewal in 2015, respectively. In 2016, Claire conducts the weddings of Leah Patterson (Ada Nicodemou and Zac MacGuire (Charlie Clausen) and Nate Cooper (Kyle Pryor) and Ricky Sharpe (Bonnie Sveen). The following year, she conducts the wedding of VJ Patterson (Matt Little) and Billie Ashford. (Tessa de Josselin) at the hospital. Three year later, Claire is on hand to official the remarriage of Alf (Ray Meagher) and Martha Stewart (Belinda Giblin).
12 March–9 April 2008	Darren McGrath	Kim Knuckey	Darren is a Senior Constable at Yabbie Creek Police Station.
17 March	Alan Stanniford	Don Atkinson	Alan visits Summer Bay to see his wife Lisa (Zoe Tuckwell-Smith) who tells him she is there for advertising conference and asks her when she will return home. He leaves with no knowledge of Lisa's affair with Scott Hunter (Kip Gamblin).
18 March–26 April	Joy Foxton	Elaine Lee	Joy is Cassie Turner's (Sharni Vinson) grandmother. She arrives in Summer Bay to co-ordinate the revival of the "Miss Groper" beauty pageant. Her old rival Colleen Smart (Lyn Collingwood), who won the contest in 1959, is less than pleased. While arguing with Colleen, Joy suffers a stroke and falls into a coma. She is then pronounced brain dead and her life support machine is switched off.
28 March–16 September	Alison Free	Larisa Chen	Alison is a doctor at Northern Districts hospital. She treats VJ Patterson (Nicholas & Cameron Stevens) for burned hands after a prank by Ryan Baker (Isaac Gorman) backfires and tells Hayley Lawson (Bec Cartwright) that Kim Hyde (Chris Hemsworth) is the father of her unborn baby. Alison is present when Chloe Richards (Kristy Wright) dies of an embolism following a car crash and operates on colleague Flynn Saunders (Joel McIlroy) after he suffers a fall from a cliff and refuses to discharge him when he tries to leave. She discovers the truth behind the paternity test results but is killed in a car accident before she can tell Hayley and Kim the truth.
6–12 April	Samantha Morton	Felicity King	Samantha is a girl who Robbie Hunter (Jason Smith) briefly dates in order to make Tasha Andrews (Isabel Lucas) jealous.
11 April–3 August	Clare Brody	Katrina Campbell	Clare is a Senior Detective who joins in the investigation of the Summer Bay Stalker and frequently clashes with Peter Baker (Nicholas Bishop) when she is installed as his superior. It is revealed that Clare and Peter were in a relationship previously and things are tense but they eventually reconcile. Clare is late promoted and Peter proposes and she accepts and they move away to the City, however Peter returns alone several months later saying Clare cheated on him but it is revealed to be a lie.
11 April 2005 – 30 May 2006	Dale Browning	Barry Shepherd	Dale is the manager of a local storage site. He appears when Peter Baker (Nicholas Bishop) is chasing the Summer Bay stalker and grants him access to the site, where fertilizer to make a bomb is found. The following year, Dale calls Peter and Jack Holden (Paul O'Brien) and lets him know the Stalker has used the same name and storage space as last time.
15–26 April	Ben Foxton	Craig Elliot	Ben arrives in Summer Bay after his mother Joy (Elaine Lee) is rendered comatose by a stroke. His niece Cassie (Sharni Vinson) is visibly shaken by his presence. It is revealed that Ben abused Cassie when was younger and Cassie realises he is doing the same to her cousin Carla Bennett (Ashleigh Johnson). Cassie reports Ben and he is taken away for questioning.
25 April	Pauline Bennett	Beth Armstrong	Pauline is Cassie Turner's (Sharni Vinson) aunt. She and her children Carla (Ashleigh Johnson) and Liam arrive in the bay, following her mother, Joy Foxton's (Elaine Lee) death. Cassie notices her uncle Ben call Carla "Angel", a name he called Cassie in her youth and asks Carla if Ben has been abusing her. Carla admits it and Cassie reports Ben.
25 April	Carla Bennett	Ashleigh Johnson	Pauline is Cassie Turner's (Sharni Vinson) aunt. She and her children Carla (Ashleigh Johnson) and Liam arrive in the bay, following her mother, Joy Foxton's (Elaine Lee) death. Cassie notices her uncle Ben call Carla "Angel", a name he called Cassie in her youth and asks Carla if Ben has been abusing her. Carla admits it and Cassie reports Ben.
25 April	Liam Bennett	Uncredited	Pauline is Cassie Turner's (Sharni Vinson) aunt. She and her children Carla (Ashleigh Johnson) and Liam arrive in the bay, following her mother, Joy Foxton's (Elaine Lee) death. Cassie notices her uncle Ben call Carla "Angel", a name he called Cassie in her youth and asks Carla if Ben has been abusing her. Carla admits it and Cassie reports Ben.
3 May	Zoe McCallister	Uncredited	Zoe is a nurse who works at Northern Districts hospital, seen in flashbacks. She is murdered by Eve Jacobsen (Emily Perry), who steals her identity and burns her body to prevent identification. Zoe's body is found by Matilda (Indiana Evans) and Henry Hunter (Tobi Atkins).
9 May–7 June	Jason Pappa	Joshua Biagi	Jason is a student at Summer Bay High. He and a friend begin bullying Diesel Williams (Marcus Jacommetti) and insinuate Diesel is gay based on the way he dresses. He and Diesel fight which Ric Dalby (Mark Furze) and Sally Fletcher (Kate Ritchie) break up. Matilda Hunter (Indiana Evans) goes with Jason to a party on the beach but rejects him several days later. He then insults her but Callan Sherman (Kain O'Keeffe) attacks him. When Carl Summons (John O'Hare) interviews him over Sally's conduct with Diesel, Jason testifies that he has seen them together outside of school.
20–23 May	Jim Wallace	Harold Hopkins	Jim is a retired police officer. Morag Bellingham (Cornelia Frances) visits him in order to get information about an incident involving Josie Russell (Laurie Foell) in 1989. Jim reveals to her he was a regular client of Josie's when she ran a brothel and agreed to cover up the fact that Josie had killed a client who attempted to rape her, in self-defence in return for sexual favours. Morag persuades him to talk to the authorities but when Peter Baker (Nicholas Bishop) and constable Lara Fitzgerald (Rebecca George) arrive, Jim's landlord tells them that he has paid up and moved on. His body is later discovered but the cause of his death is never revealed.
1–13 June	Callan Sherman	Kain O'Keeffe	Callan is a friend of Ric Dalby (Mark Furze). They met while Ric was living rough. Callan demands money as payment for helping Ric while he was on the run. Ric gives him the money in order to get him to leave, but Callan decides to stay. He takes an interest in Matilda Hunter (Indiana Evans) and comes to her defence when Jason Pappa (Joshua Biagi) insults her. Matilda sneaks off from a concert to meet up with Callan and he offers her some drugs with the indent to take advantage of her but Matilda wonders off. It emerges that Ric witnessed Callan rape a girl in the city but was afraid to come forward in case he was arrested. Ric tries to get Callan to leave town but he asks for £300, much to Ric's anger. A fight breaks out between the two but is stopped. When Callan tries to drug Matilda again, Ric catches him and beats him up. When Ric is about to be charged with assault, Julie Cooper (Lisa Hayson-Phillips) finds a bottle of Rohypnol in Callan's clothes and Ric threatens to expose him. He flees the hospital before the police arrive.
7–16 June	Carl Summons	John O'Hare	Carl is a school inspector sent to Summer Bay High to probe Diesel Williams' (Marcus Jacommetti) claims of his foster mother and teacher, Sally Fletcher (Kate Ritchie) sexually harassing him. He speaks to several students and gets various stories from them about Sally's relationship with Diesel. Diesel then tells Carl that Sally had kissed him and Ric Dalby (Mark Furze) and Cassie Turner (Sharni Vinson) had threatened him into keeping quiet. Dan Baker (Tim Campbell) refuses to verify Diesel's stories but Diesel presents some fake emails Sally had allegedly sent. After discovering a picture of Diesel in Sally's locket, Carl stands Sally down and informs the police.
9–10 June	Mystery Man	Lleyton Hewitt	A man who unsuccessfully tries to attract the attentions of Hayley Lawson (Bec Cartwright).
10–14 June	Terry Rawlings	Laurence Coy	Terry offers Matilda Hunter (Indiana Evans) a lift after she leaves a party in a drunken state. Matilda's disappearance raises suspicion and a witness reports seeing Terry carrying a heavy object from his car the same night. Matilda's brother, Scott (Kip Gamblin) tries to attack Terry but is restrained by Peter Baker (Nicholas Bishop). He is questioned at the station and is released after his story of buying a carpet checks out. Matilda is revealed to be locked in Terry's shed and escapes. Terry is arrested and it is revealed he had a daughter who died fifteen years earlier and blamed himself for it and saw Matilda as a replacement for her.
16 June–5 July	Noelene Baker	Kris McQuade	Noelene is Peter (Nicholas Bishop) and Dan Baker's (Tim Campbell) mother. She arrives in Summer Bay ahead of Dan's wedding to Leah Patterson (Ada Nicodemou) and immediately strikes up a friendship with Leah's mother, Helen (Peta Toppano) but they argue over the wedding due to their respective Anglican and Greek Orthodox backgrounds, much to Dan and Leah's annoyance. Dan and Leah attempt to elope but are caught by their mothers. Noelene and Helen agree to stay out of the preparations. On Noelene's return for the wedding, she and Peter reconcile after years of frostiness following Peter's affair with Dan's ex-wife Amanda Vale (Holly Brisley).
24 June–14 July	Troy Peters	Christian Willis	Troy is Chloe Richards' (Kristy Wright) ex-boyfriend. He begins stalking her and follows her to Summer Bay. It is revealed that Chloe left him after he hit her out of jealousy when he saw her with a male friend. Jesse McGregor (Ben Unwin) warns Troy off her but Troy sneak attacks him as a result. He is then arrested but bailed and gatecrashes Alf Stewart's (Ray Meagher) 60th birthday party but is ejected from the house by Flynn Saunders (Joel McIlroy) and Will Smith (Zac Drayson). After Chloe's death in a car accident, Troy is the chief suspect. In spite of his innocence due to his credit card being used at the time of the accident, Jesse beats him up. Troy is then hospitalised and Jesse is charged with assault. Nothing further is heard of Troy.
4–5 July	Kevin Baker	Andy Anderson	Kevin is the father of Peter (Nicholas Bishop) and Dan Baker (Tim Campbell). He and his wife Noelene (Kris McQuade) attend Dan's wedding to Leah Patterson (Ada Nicodemou). Things have been frosty with Kevin and Peter for a number of years but they reconcile and Kevin suggests that Peter bring his girlfriend Clare Brody (Katrina Campbell)
22–23 July	Judith Lane	Jane Fullerton Smith	Judith is a mediator in a custody dispute over Olivia Richards (Ivy Latimer) between Irene Roberts (Lynne McGranger) and Olivia's grandmother, Diana Fraser (Kerry McGuire) following the death of Olivia's mother, Chloe (Kristy Wright).
22–23 July	Michael Maleto	Antony Grey	Michael is Diana Fraser's (Kerry McGuire) lawyer, who she calls on to assist her in a custody battle with Irene Roberts (Lynne McGranger) over her granddaughter, Olivia Richards (Ivy Latimer).
3 August 2005 – 20 June 2006	Kevin Green	Scott Hall-Watson	Green is a doctor at Northern Districts Hospital. He attends to Morag Bellingham (Cornelia Frances) when she is brought in following an altercation with Josh West (Daniel Collopy). Green also attends to Graham Walters (Doug Scroope) after his heart attack and Leah Patterson-Baker (Ada Nicodemou) when she miscarries. He later attends to the many injured in the explosion at Jack Holden (Paul O'Brien) and Martha MacKenzie's (Jodi Gordon) wedding. Green tells Jack's father Tony Holden (Jon Sivewright) that Jack will need a liver transplant due to his injuries.
9–24 August	Tom Anderson	Don Halbert	Tom is the former lover of Kerry Hyde. Kerry's son Kim (Chris Hemsworth) visits him while searching for Kerry.
10 August	Harry Chambers	Rodney Dobsen	Harry arrives in the Bay and tells local residents that Jack Holden (Paul O'Brien) is responsible for the death of his teenage daughter, prompting fury from the locals. A town meeting is held in order to gauge both sides of the story. Jack reveals that he shot Harry's daughter in retaliation to a shot she fired at him during an armed robbery she committed.
12–25 August	Leo Simms	Johann Walravan	Leo is a burglar who breaks into the beach house but is discovered by Robbie Hunter (Jason Smith). He deals with Robbie easily but has more difficulty with Tasha Andrews (Isabel Lucas). Leo escapes but returns to the house and knocks over Irene Roberts (Lynne McGranger) while fleeing. Robbie devises a plan to get Leo arrested and Amanda Vale (Holly Brisley) picks him out in a line-up but he is exonerated when footage of him at Yabbie Creek RSL is dated to when Amanda's house was allegedly burgled. Leo then menaces Amanda and realises she faked a burglary for insurance reasons as she is nearly bankrupt. He demands $5000 or he will go to the police. Amanda meets Leo but only has $3000, which enrages him. Amanda flees and Leo grabs hold of her car. He falls and hits his head on the concrete and dies instantly. Amanda quickly hides his body in the undergrowth and plants her jewellery on him. The police find Leo and write his death off as an accident. It is later revealed Leo was hired by Corey Henderson (Adam Saunders) to poison Irene by slipping Mercury into her tea sweetener.
15–23 August	Lorraine Robertson	Gael Ballantyne	Lorraine is Barry Hyde's (Ivar Kants) sister. When Barry's son, Kim begins looking for his mother, Kerry, Lorraine pretends to be her and cruelly rejects Kim. The following week, Kim breaks into her house and looks for answers contained in an envelope but she catches him. They have a confrontation in which Kim refuses to leave. Lorraine relents and admits that she is not his mother but his aunt and tells him if he wants answers, he should ask Barry. Lorraine snatches the envelope and orders Kim to leave. It is later revealed Barry killed Kerry after she drowned Kim's brother, Jonathon and Lorraine helped dispose of her body.
23 August	Brian Robertson	Paul Coolahan	Brian is Lorraine Robertson's (Gael Ballantyne) husband. He appears when Kim Hyde (Chris Hemsworth) and Tasha Andrews (Isabel Lucas) arrive at his home. He is unaware of his wife's connection to the Hyde family.
2 September–1 November	Corey Henderson	Adam Saunders	Corey is a probationary constable at Yabbie Creek Police Station who starts there around the same time as Jack Holden (Paul O'Brien). He investigates a noise complaint against Robbie Hunter and Tasha Andrews and follows up a burglary caused by Leo Simms (Johann Walvaran). Corey also probes Ric Dalby's (Mark Furze) assault at the hands of Sean Jeffries (Gabriel Egan). When Irene Roberts (Lynne McGranger) advertises a spare room, Corey takes her up on the offer. Corey shows interest in Martha MacKenzie (Jodi Gordon) and Jack is annoyed and they nearly get into a fight. Irene begins showing signs of strange erratic behaviour and is diagnosed with mental illness and admitted to hospital. It soon becomes clear that Corey has been poisoning Irene and it is revealed he paid Leo to slip Mercury into her tea sweetener. Corey requests a transfer to another police station and Martha agrees to go with him but Jack discovers Corey has been poisoning the jurors that found his father, Roger Davies, guilty and Irene was one of the victims. Jack overpowers and arrests Corey and he is imprisoned. Martha begins having nightmares about him and visits him in prison and is stunned find he is remorseless and has lost his grip on reality, convinced she will wait for him.
9–13 September	Sean Jefferies	Gabriel Egan	Sean is Aden Jefferies' (Todd Lasance) older brother. After Ric Dalby (Mark Furze) injures Aden during a rugby game, Sean is furious and severely beats up Ric. He then holds Ric's foster father, Flynn Saunders (Joel McIlroy) hostage but is foiled and jailed.
18 September 2005 – 14 February 2006	Greg Matthews	Josef Ber	Greg is a colleague of Flynn Saunders (Joel McIlroy) at Northern Districts Hospital. He discovers Flynn has a melanoma on his back, conducts a biopsy and presents Flynn with the news that he only has a matter of months to live. He also reappears when Flynn is knocked over by Belle Taylor (Jessica Tovey) and tells his wife Sally Fletcher (Kate Ritchie) that Flynn only has a matter of weeks to live. Greg later attends Flynn's funeral.
27 September	Len Green	Gary Baxter	Len is the local mayor. He is framed by Josh West (Daniel Collopy), who sets him up in a compromising position with Amanda Vale (Holly Brisley) in order to gain a foothold in the mayoral elections.
29 September	Pat McGrath	Uncredited	Pat is the wife of Darren McGrath (Kim Knuckey). She and Darren join Martha MacKenzie (Jodi Gordon) and Corey Henderson (Adam Saunders) for drinks at Noah's bar.
13 October–25 November	Kylie Kopperton	Leah Etkind	Kylie meets Kim Hyde (Chris Hemsworth) and Robbie Hunter (Jason Smith) at the nudist camp where she works and assumes they are a gay couple after Robbie originally books the lovers' package for him and his girlfriend Tasha Andrews (Isabel Lucas), who is unable to attend. Kylie attends a dance party at the Summer Bay Surf Club and takes a liking to Kim. She offers him some ecstasy tablets which he refuses to take. Kylie continues to offer Kim drugs which he refuses but eventually agrees after finding out Hayley Lawson's (Ella Scott Lynch) son, Noah is not his child. Kim takes a few tablets at the party and begins using heavily. This culminates in Kim overdosing when Kylie's friend Dean invites Kim to enjoy some liquid ecstasy. Kylie then orders Dean and his friends to get Kim to hospital and they leave him outside.
19 October–8 November	Bert Biddle	Zachary Garred	Bert is an intern at Northern Districts hospital. Amanda Vale (Holly Brisley) poses as Hayley Lawson (Ella Scott Lynch) in order to obtain DNA samples from a paternity test, which Bert hands over. Bert tries asking Amanda out a week later but she rejects him which is witnessed by Josh West (Daniel Collopy). Amanda later asks Bert for an Ultrasound photo when she pretends to be pregnant and he agrees to play along but informs Josh of Amanda's dealings. Flynn Saunders (Joel McIlroy), Bert's superior realises Kim Hyde (Chris Hemsworth) is not the father of Hayley's son and notices the DNA test results missing. Flynn confronts Bert who refuses to disclose anything but complies on the threat of dismissal
25 October–25 November	Noah Hunter	Zane Rugless; Taylah Dempsey; Jessica Wong; Audrey Hawkins; Ella Hammer-McIver; Marco DeMarco Webber	Noah is the newborn son of Hayley Lawson (Ella Scott Lynch), born to her when she is trapped in a remote caravan. Scott Hunter (Kip Gamblin) and Kim Hyde (Chris Hemsworth) are both embroiled in a paternity dispute which is settled after Flynn Saunders (Joel McIlroy) discovers that Kim does not have the same Blood type as Noah. Scott and Hayley reconcile and they and Noah leave for France the following month.
28 October 2005 – 19 January 2006	Dudley Shepherd	Terry Serio	Dudley is a bookmaker approached by Dan Baker ((Tim Campbell) who visits him at a race track. Dan wins $1000 and continues to do business with Dudley. Dan meets Dudley to place a bet for $5000 and he agrees to let him on credit but Dan's horse fails to come in and Dudley is enraged and threatens to tell his wife Leah (Ada Nicodemou).Dan's debt mount and Dudley tries another approach by picking his son Ryan (Isaac Gorman) up from school. After Dan raises $9000 by selling his car, Dudley tells him it is not enough and orders for him to be beaten and tells him he owes a further $2000. He then kidnaps Ryan and demands money until Dan pays up and raises the amount by $2000 per hour. Dan contacts the police and Dudley tries to flee with Ryan but he crashes into a police car occupied by Ken Harper (Mark McCann) and Lara Fitzgerald (Rebecca George) promptly arrest him. Dudley later escapes prison during a storm and holds Leah and Rachel Armstrong (Amy Mathews) hostage. They try to escape but Dudley is a match for them until Dan's brother Peter (Nicholas Bishop) overpowers him and rearrests him.
28–29 October	David Knotts	Alan Dukes	David is a gun salesman who Martha MacKenzie (Jodi Gordon) visits after a confrontation with Corey Henderson (Adam Saunders). He lets her test a weapon and she illegally buys a gun from him. After accidentally shooting her cousin, Ric Dalby (Mark Furze) in a panic, Martha returns the gun but David refuses to accept it and denies her a refund, which constable Jack Holden (Paul O'Brien) witnesses.
9–22 November	Jimmy Knox	Paul Caesar	Jimmy is an associate of Dudley Shepherd (Terry Serio). He hounds Dan Baker after he fails to pay his gambling debts to Dudley. Jimmy threatens Ryan's son Ryan (Isaac Gorman) if Dan does not comply. Dan tries to pacify him with $7000, but Jimmy refuses to take it. He later offers to take a down payment but Dan loses it in an attempt to win the full amount. Jimmy then tells Dan he has used up his last chance and will pay one way or another
11 November 2005 – 19 March 2012	Derek Young	Charlie Hopkins	Derek is a doctor at Northern Districts hospital. He is first seen when Flynn Saunders (Joel McIlroy) announces his retirement due to terminal cancer.
11 November 2005–2 October 2006	Charity Fernbrook	Charlotte Gregg	Charity is a member of The Believers, a local Cult headed by Mumma Rose (Linden Wilkinson). She stands Guard over Martha MacKenzie (Jodi Gordon) when she tries to rescue Tasha Andrews (Isabel Lucas) from the cult's clutches. She sends Martha's boyfriend Jack Holden (Paul O'Brien) a text message from Martha's phone telling him to stay away. When Tasha tries to escape, Charity foils her escape attempt. She also stops Tasha and Mumma Rose's son, Michael Abraham (James Mitchell) from being cleaned with fire in a "Purification ritual". Charity is later arrested with the other believers, despite protests of no wrongdoing. Charity is later an accessory in Mumma Rose's kidnapping of Tasha to force her to give birth her baby she believes is the chosen one but Mumma Rose is foiled. Ella then assists Tasha in caring for her newborn daughter, Ella. She then kidnaps Ella and brings her to Mumma Rose. Charity is arrested and remains silent throughout her interview but Irene Roberts (Lynne McGranger) is able to convince her to tell her where Ella is.
