= Tasha Andrews =

Fictional character on the 'Home and Away' soap opera

- Home and Away character
- Portrayed by: Isabel Lucas
- Duration: 2003–2006
- First appearance: Episode 3544; 31 July 2003
- Last appearance: Episode 4292; 10 October 2006
- Introduced by: Julie McGuaran
- Book appearances: Home and Away: Mayday
In-universe information
- Other names: Jane Doe; Tasha Hunter
- Occupation: Student
- Father: Ian Osbourne
- Mother: Angie Russell
- Adoptive father: Mike Andrews
- Adoptive mother: Jenny Andrews
- Half-brothers: Dylan Russell
- Husband: Robbie Hunter (2006–)
- Daughters: Ella Hunter
- Grandmothers: Monica Markham
- Other relatives: Josie Russell

Natasha "Tasha" Hunter (also Andrews) is a fictional character from the Australian soap opera Home and Away, played by Isabel Lucas. She made her first screen appearance in the episode broadcast on 31 July 2003. Tasha departed the series on 10 October 2006.

Tasha arrives in Summer Bay as a disoriented young girl who only speaks Pig Latin for several weeks. Her backstory of being raised by adoptive survivalist parents soon comes to the fore. She quickly befriends Max Sutherland (Sebastian Elmaloglou), Flynn Saunders (Joel McIlroy) and Sally Fletcher (Kate Ritchie). Tasha has a love interest in the form of Robbie Hunter (Jason Smith) and the couple later marry. Other storylines see Tasha on the hunt for her biological parents Angie Russell (Laurie Foell) and Ian Osbourne (Andrew McFarlane). She is also involved in some of the more dramatic storylines including joining a cult called The Believers, led by Mumma Rose (Linden Wilkinson) and Jonah Abraham (James Mitchell). Tasha subsequently falls pregnant and is held against her will by Mumma Rose following the child's birth.

== Casting ==
Lucas joined the serial in 2003 after being discovered by talent scout Sharron Meissner, who was on holiday at the time. Meissner encouraged Lucas to audition for the part of Kit Hunter, which eventually went to Amy Mizzi. However, Series Producer Julie McGuaran created the role of Tasha specifically for Lucas. Lucas was then required to move from her home town of Melbourne to Sydney, where the serial is filmed.

She told Michael Gadd of the Newcastle Herald: "It gets a little crazy at times, but when we have to get up at sunrise to start a shoot it hits me the most," Lucas said. "I just walk out to see the start of the day at Palm Beach and think 'Wow, this is my office'. "Believe me, most of the time I don't feel like I'm working 60-hour weeks." She described the role as "meaty" for someone relatively new and said it was part of the reason she enjoyed playing Tasha. Lucas described the event as "fate intertwined with my own self-belief".

== Storylines ==
=== Backstory ===
Tasha was born to Angie Russell (Laurie Foell) after a one-night stand with the wealthy Ian Osbourne (Andrew McFarlane). Ian paid Angie off and she subsequently put Tasha up for adoption by survivalist couple Mike and Jenny Andrews, who had dropped out of society. Angie put $30,000 along a letter to her daughter to be opened when she reached the age of eighteen in a box and gave it to the couple. Mike and Jenny raised Tasha in a fortress camp in the bush and prepared for Y2K. They were killed trying to protect camp with firearms, leaving Tasha traumatised, forcing her to flee.

=== 2003–06 ===
Tasha is spotted walking along the beach by Max Sutherland (Sebastian Elmaloglou). She is seemingly spooked by him and jumps into the sea. When Max returns the next day with Flynn Saunders (Joel McIlroy), Tasha runs off again but falls and hurts her ankle. They bring her to Flynn's surgery but Tasha does not say a word. At the hospital, Tasha tries to escape and but is immediately sedated. Flynn tries to communicate with Tasha by speaking several different languages to no avail. He soon realises she is speaking Pig latin. Tasha forms an attachment to Irene Roberts (Lynne McGranger), who is able to calm her down one day at the hospital. Tasha's stay at the Beach House is met with drama after she burns her hands in a fire when is she is nowhere near it. She is visibly scared of Kane Phillips (Sam Atwell) and through flashbacks it is revealed that Kane and his older brother, Scott (Josh Rosenthal) held her hostage during a petrol station robbery. Irene quickly works out Tasha's name and she begins learning some English.

Tasha's enrollment in the local High school does not run smoothly but Kit Hunter takes her under her wing and helps her to adjust to normal society. Flynn learns that Angie is Tasha's biological mother which shocks Irene, who makes a realisation after seeing a photo of a younger Angie. Irene tries to protect Tasha but she finds out anyway. Max is shocked as Angie had caused problems between his uncle Rhys (Michael Beckley) and aunt Shelley (Paula Forrest). Tasha is hurt when she discovers Irene trying to hide the truth and runs away. Kit's brother, Robbie tries to find her by setting a trap but needs rescuing himself after he is bitten by a snake. Tasha saves him and they quickly become friends and share a kiss.

Kim Hyde (Chris Hemsworth) arrives in Summer Bay and Tasha and Robbie quickly become friends with him. There is a small love triangle when Tasha kisses Kim and Robbie is hurt but they reconcile and they all remain friends. Duncan Stewart (Brendan McKensy) exposes Angie's true nature in a videotape Seb Miller (Mitch Firth) made a year earlier. Tasha has dream in which Angie appears and heads to the bush to unearth the money she had hidden and finds some guns in the process. Duncan blackmails Tasha into paying him off in exchange for her father's identity, which she does. Tasha uses the remainder of the money to buy friends presents but they kindly turn her down. After some more tension with Irene, Tasha goes looking for her father, Ian Osbourne. Ian sets Tasha some tests and gives her a choice; join him in the city or remain in Summer Bay. She chooses the latter.

Tasha meets her half-brother Dylan (Brett Hicks-Maitland) and Angie's cousin, Josie (also played by Foell). She builds up a relationship with Josie, much to Irene's chagrin. During this time Tasha and Robbie consummate their relationship. Things are strained when Robbie has a HIV scare after stepping on a needle during a camping trip and behaves erratically, pushing Kim and Tasha away. She is also disappointed in Josie when she jilts Jesse McGregor (Ben Unwin) at the altar after cheating on him with Marc Edwards (Christopher Hobbs). Tasha joins a cult named the believers much to worry of her friends who warn her, but she refuses to listen. The cult's leader, Mumma Rose (Linden Wilkinson) decides Tasha will be the chosen one and carry her son Jonah Abraham's (James Mitchell) baby. She is later drugged and falls pregnant but Jonah is later revealed to be sterile, meaning he was not the father. Tasha later gives birth to a daughter who she names Ella. She struggles to love her baby at first but after the child is kidnapped by Mumma Rose, she changes her mind. Following Robbie's trial for the murder of his grandfather, Graham Walters (Doug Scroope) and a guilty verdict, albeit with no jail time, Josie invites the couple and baby Ella to join her in Boston and they leave.

== Reception ==
For her portrayal of Tasha, Lucas won the Most Popular New Female Talent accolade at the 2004 Logie Awards. Brian Courtis of the Sunday Age referred to Tasha as a "Blonde Princess" ahead of her wedding to Robbie.

In an interview with The Sunday Times, Catholic Priest Toby Sherring spoke out against the storyline where Mumma Rose convinces Tasha to join the Believers. He said: "Sometimes it is assumed that all churches operate like cults, who will steal away naive teenagers from their families, brainwash them with strange ideas and involve them in strange suicide pacts, or send them knocking on people's doors with predictions about the end of the world." He added: "Because religion in TV shows such as Home and Away is portrayed in this way, the media version is firstly more believable and secondly much more intriguing, although ultimately unappealing."
