= Josh West (Home and Away) =

- Home and Away character
- Portrayed by: Daniel Collopy
- Duration: 2001–2003, 2005–2006
- First appearance: 21 November 2001
- Last appearance: 16 May 2006
- Book appearances: Dani on Trial
- Spin-off appearances: Home and Away: Secrets and the City (2002)
In-universe information
- Occupation: Lifeguard; Mayor
- Father: Greg West
- Mother: Jackie Turner

Joshua "Josh" West is a fictional character from the Australian Channel Seven soap opera Home and Away, played by Daniel Collopy. He debuted on-screen on 21 November 2001. West left the series on 30 April 2003 upon departing for two years, but made reappearances before departing on 31 October 2003. He returned on 23 September 2005. He then made his final on-screen appearance on 16 May 2006, when he was killed off.

== Development ==
In September 2001, actor Daniel Collopy successfully auditioned for the role of Josh and had to move from Melbourne to Sydney in the space of "a few days" to begin filming. Josh was introduced as the serial new trainee lifeguard and a potential love interest for established character Dani Sutherland (Tammin Sursok). Josh was Collopy's first regular television role and he felt it was a "fantastic opportunity" to work on Home and Away.

Josh is a "charismatic" young man, who moves into the Caravan Park owned by the Sutherland family. Of his character, Collopy said "Josh is a friendly, easygoing and wise school-leaver who really wants to be a lifeguard. His aim in life is to take it easy and relax with his mates. He's looking for fun, not trouble." Network Seven describe Josh as being part of a "high-society family" and initially being "about as laid-back as they come". Josh likes "learning and broadening his mind" and has a passion for surfing. Josh's "tall, dark and handsome" appearance has made him popular with the female characters. They also said that Summer Bay lifestyle suited Josh in his early appearances. Collopy said there were no similarities between himself and Josh.

Josh's stay in the Bay gets off to a bad start when his friends have a food fight at the Sutherland house and Josh does not stop it. They all get blamed and Josh is left to clean up and prove that he is "a good guy after all." While Rhys (Michael Beckley) and Shelley Sutherland (Paula Forrest) warm up to Josh, their daughter Dani dislikes him. Collopy explained that Josh immediately fancies Dani, but she does not want to know. She makes it clear that she is not interested in him, which Collopy said surprises Josh. He said "He's never had a problem with girls before, but Dani is a different story altogether." Josh later saves Dani's sister Kirsty Sutherland (Christie Hayes) from drowning, after she gets into trouble trying to save someone else with no one around. Josh is able to prove himself to Alf Stewart (Ray Meagher), who is in charge of hiring lifeguards.

Josh and Dani establish a relationship, but it is problematic and leads to a brief separation. They eventually reconcile following more arguments. Sursok told a reporter from Inside Soap that "their relationship has come down to silly mind games and petty arguments, they've come through so many problems and dramas that instead of really being there for each other and appreciating what they have, they've lost sight of why they are together in the first place." Hayley Smith (Rebecca Cartwright) makes Dani see that they should not be arguing. Dani realises that the arguments are meaningless and the pair sort out their differences.

Collopy was written out of the serial when Josh is murdered in a whodunit storyline. The serial's producers wanted to capitalise on the success of their stalker storyline, which pulled in high viewing figures, by creating a new mystery plot. One suspect is Amanda Vale (Holly Brisley). While interviewed by a reporter from Inside Soap, Brisley admitted that even she did not know who the killer was. She said that "it will be a real shock when the truth comes out". It was later revealed that Barry Hyde (Ivar Kants) shot Josh by accident.

== Storylines ==
Josh arrives in Summer Bay in late 2001 while on Schoolies and begins hanging around with Kirsty Sutherland who lets him and his friends come back to her home at the Summer Bay caravan park and have a party, while her parents Rhys and Shelley Sutherland are away. They wreck the house and scramble to put it back in order before Rhys and Shelley return. When Rhys sits on a chair and falls through, he throws Josh and his friends out.

Josh then sets his sights on Kirsty's sister, Dani who rejects his advances at first but they later began dating. Josh quickly finds employment as a lifeguard at the Surf Club, taking over from Vinnie Patterson (Ryan Kwanten), who has recently taken paternity leave. This arrangement becomes permanent when Vinnie is sentenced to 18 months imprisonment for fraud after being framed by his father, Ralph Patterson (Alan Cinis). After Josh receives his HSC results, he isn't phased despite scoring highly. He reluctantly agrees to attend university in the City as per his wealthy parents' wishes but decides to return to the Bay and continue being a lifeguard. Josh settles into the bay and begins befriending several local teens Brodie Hanson (Susie Rugg), Noah Lawson (Beau Brady) and Hayley.

When Josh wants to take his relationship with Dani a step further, she is reluctant as she was raped the previous year by Kane Phillips (Sam Atwell). Kane's presence in the bay angers Josh, which puts a strain on their relationship. Josh also becomes privy to the fact that Kane is dating Kirsty. After a difficult time, Josh and Dani finally become intimate on the beach one night. Dani later moves in with Josh, Noah and Hayley to an apartment the four dub "The Palace". Josh's mother, Jackie (Julieanne Newbould), arrives in the bay and she pens an article that could potentially ruin local doctor and counsellor Flynn Saunders (Martin Dingle-Wall). Josh manages to talk her out of writing the article, and Flynn's reputation is saved. Josh faces his biggest test as a lifeguard when local doctor Charlotte Adams (Stephanie Jacobsen) goes for a final swim before leaving to work in an orphanage in Vietnam. Charlotte nearly drowns but is resuscitated by Josh. Unfortunately, Charlotte dies in hospital of complications a week later and Josh blames himself and decides to change career track. When Josh shares a kiss with Hayley, shortly after his breakup with Dani, Noah is incensed with rage and Josh moves out of the palace and into the flat above the Diner. Josh and Hayley date for a while but Alf Stewart (Ray Meagher), who is suffering a brain tumour, sees visions of an unhappy future for the couple. Hayley eventually breaks up with Josh.

After being one of many suspects in the frame for the murder of Angie Russell (Laurie Foell), Josh discovers his father, Greg (Dane Carson) is ill and leaves to take over his business. Later in the year Josh makes several sporadic returns, including making plans to destroy and develop the drop in centre, destroying Colleen Smart's (Lyn Collingwood) mobile home, firing Jesse McGregor (Ben Unwin) from the Surf Club Gym. During one of Josh's visits, he learns Dani is to stand trial after running Kane down with her car and Josh is later subpoenaed to be a witness for the prosecution. He gives evidence against Dani and leans on Kirsty to sell her story about her romance with Kane to him so he can have it published in Jackie's paper. He causes further irritation when he tries to manipulate Tasha Andrews (Isabel Lucas). Having made too many enemies, Josh leaves town and nothing is heard of him for two years.

In 2005, Josh returns to town and runs for Mayor which doesn't sit well with Alf, who is also running. Josh later wins the election and proceeds with Project 56, a controversial project involving the construction of a traffic bridge connecting two ends of the bay together with which he enlists the help of Amanda. Alf's sister, Morag Bellingham (Cornelia Frances) is keen to bring Josh down and a battle soon ensues. In 2006, however, Morag is eventually forced to back off after Josh nearly kills her in an attempt to stop Morag revealing the true intentions of Project 56. Josh's reign also sees he death of Amanda's husband Graham after he uncovers the truth about the project. Josh then makes several enemies after framing Alf for money embezzlement, resulting in him being imprisoned. By the time Amanda realizes Josh's true colours, it too late and Josh attempts to kill her. Josh allows Tasha to be held prisoner by the Believers religious group and also begins threatening Alf's grandson Ric Dalby (Mark Furze), who resorts to violence against Josh, and Robbie Hunter (Jason Smith), who also tries to kill Josh but backs out. Josh later tries discrediting the police by attempting to expose the fact that they know the Summer Bay Stalker has returned. Unfortunately, despite the number of people against Josh, nobody is able to prevent Project 56 from going ahead until Josh is found dead one morning in his council office. The police lead one investigation and Morag begins her own. The two investigations reach a climax, resulting in Josh's killer narrowly escaping them. But weeks after, Barry later confesses to Morag he accidentally killed Josh, who had stolen documents from Morag's office and learnt that Barry had killed his own wife to protect his son. Josh had threatened to call the police and threatened Barry with a gun. Barry made a grab for the weapon and, during the struggle between the two, the gun went off and Josh was killed.

== Reception ==
For his portrayal of Josh, Collopy was nominated for the "Most Popular New Male Talent" Logie Award in 2003. Collopy was nominated for "Best Bad Boy" at the 2006 Inside Soap Awards. Michael Idato of the said that Josh was the "new hottie" in Summer Bay and credited Josh's on-screen romance as transforming Collopy into the "No 1. TV Week coverboy". Channel 5 said that Josh was a "good boy gone bad" and was not short of enemies. They opined that using Amanda to scam Graham was a memorable storyline and said that his murder was karma. When Josh returned to the serial with his money making scam, a writer from the Liverpool Echo said that it "looks set to make him unpopular with the residents". They added that "true to form" it was not long before he was "the arch-villain of Summer Bay".
