= Josie Russell (Home and Away) =

- Home and Away character
- Portrayed by: Laurie Foell
- Duration: 2004–2005
- First appearance: 9 August 2004
- Last appearance: 29 June 2005
- Introduced by: Julie McGuaran
In-universe information
- Occupation: Brothel owner Barmaid; Businesswoman
- First cousins: Angie Russell
- Other relatives: Tasha Andrews; Dylan Russell

Jacinta "Josie" Russell is a fictional character on the Australian soap opera Home and Away, portrayed by actress Laurie Foell. She first appeared on 9 August 2004 and departed on 29 June 2005. Foell previously starred in the serial as Kelly McCane in 1999 and Josie's cousin Angie Russell in 2002.

Josie's storylines include meeting and forging a relationship with her cousin's daughter Tasha Andrews (Isabel Lucas), Becoming involved with Jesse McGregor (Ben Unwin), having an affair with ex-boyfriend Marc Edwards (Christopher Hobbs), having the circumstances of a client's death being revealed and almost being murdered by Brett Macklin (Gerry Sont).

== Development ==
Two years after departing the serial as Angie Russell, Foell rejoined the cast in 2004 to play Angie's identical cousin, Josie. Comparing the characters, Foell said "Angie was quite cold, whereas Josie is much warmer. She's a survivor who has been around the block a few times, but she's fair."

== Storylines ==
Josie appears when Irene Roberts (Lynne McGranger) and Dylan Russell (Brett Hicks-Maitland) track her down at her brothel in the city. Due to her profession, Irene wants Josie to keep her distance from Tasha Andrews (Isabel Lucas), the daughter of Josie's cousin, Angie. Josie's uncanny identical appearance to Angie causes a stir when she arrives in Summer Bay to connect with Tasha. Tasha gets along well with Josie but Irene is against her being in Tasha's life.

Josie settles into Summer Bay and donates $2000 to the school and invests in the surf club and suggests naming a new bar "Noah's" - in honour of the recently murdered Noah Lawson (Beau Brady). Tasha's friends Sally Fletcher (Kate Ritchie) and Flynn Saunders (Joel McIlroy) are suspicious and accuse Josie of wanting Tasha's inheritance. Irene enlists the help of Morag Bellingham (Cornelia Frances) for legal advice when Josie applies for guardianship of Tasha. Josie withdraws after Morag discovers a secret from her past. She then assists for Ian Osbourne (Andrew McFarlane), Tasha's biological father and his assistant Stafford McRae (Rohan Nichol) to plant surveillance cameras in the beach house, in order for Ian to keep an eye on Tasha. The cameras are soon exposed and Ian withdraws.

Josie begins a relationship with business partner Jesse McGregor (Ben Unwin) but gets cold feet when he professes his love for her and she breaks up with him as a result. Tasha concocts a scheme to get them back together by pretending to break up with her boyfriend Robbie Hunter (Jason Smith). The plan works and Josie and Jesse reunite. Josie later comforts Tasha when Ian rejects her in an act to prevent her becoming like his other children. Marc Edwards (Christopher Hobbs), Josie's ex-boyfriend arrives in Summer Bay. Although, she is now with Jesse, the two sleep together and Josie regrets it. Marc's continual presence in Summer Bay uneases her and matters escalate when he begins blackmailing her for money over her secret, the suspicious death of one of her clients. Josie reluctantly accepts Jesse's proposal of marriage and they are ready to marry but Marc presents Jesse with the video footage of him and Josie together and Jesse exposes the affair to the congregation and leaves town for several days. Following Marc's arrest as a suspect of being the Summer Bay Stalker, he is bailed and harasses Josie at a murder mystery party, where ironically he is murdered by Eve Jacobsen (Emily Perry), the real stalker. Josie is a suspect but is later cleared. She then leaves town and asks Tasha to leave with her but she declines.

Josie returns a few weeks later, having gone into business with Brett Macklin (Gerry Sont). She soon discovers Brett is responsible for illegally dumping waste and relays the information to Stafford and arranges to meet him to organise a plan to bring Brett down, However, Stafford does not turn up and Brett arrives in his place and tries to kill her by pushing her off a cliff but is foiled and arrested. Josie has a short entanglement with Scott Hunter (Kip Gamblin) but it fizzles out and she decides to leave the bay once more and settles in Boston, Massachusetts. The following year, Josie invites Tasha, Robbie and their daughter Ella to join her over there.

== Reception ==
Roz Laws of the Sunday Mercury observed "Josie, the scarily-lookalike sister of Angie, has been in Home And Away for only five minutes but has certainly made her mark.". A writer from What's On TV described her as "twisted", and stated that Foell caused trouble twice in the show in both her roles as Angie and Josie. An Inside Soap reporter branded Josie's arrival played by Foell a "bonkers - but nonetheless brilliant" storyline.
