= Ric Dalby =

- Home and Away character
- Portrayed by: Mark Furze
- Duration: 2004–2008
- First appearance: 15 September 2004
- Last appearance: 24 July 2008
- Introduced by: Julie McGauran
In-universe information
- Occupation: Student; Cleaner; Mechanic; Security guard
- Father: Owen Dalby
- Mother: Maggie Dalby
- Grandfathers: Alf Stewart
- Grandmothers: Viv Standish
- Uncles: Duncan Stewart
- Aunts: Roo Stewart; Quinn Jackson
- First cousins: Martha MacKenzie; Bryce Stewart; Ryder Jackson
- Other relatives: Morag Bellingham; Colleen Smart; Celia Stewart; Lance Smart

Eric "Ric" Dalby is a fictional character from the Australian Channel Seven soap opera Home and Away, played by Mark Furze. He appeared in the series from 15 September 2004 until 24 July 2008. Furze was cast into the role after an audition and a screen test impressed producers. Furze said he was attracted to the role because of Ric's characterisation. Ric was initially portrayed as a bully of vulnerable people and held no respect for authority. Through his storylines, Ric transforms into one of the serial's "good guys" but his violent temper remained. Both Furze and interested media noted that Ric getting involved in fights became a dominant feature throughout his tenure.

Ric's use of violence has been central to various plots which have led him into trouble. In one Ric faces a murder charge for a crime he did not commit. Ric later becomes embroiled in an illegal bare-knuckle boxing plot which endangers his life. Furze trained and carried out research for the storyline, which certain media outlets compared to the 1999 film Fight Club due to their similar narratives. Ric's backstory has been attributed to forming his persona, in which he was abused by his father, Owen Dalby. Upon moving to Summer Bay, the serial implemented family links when he is revealed to be the grandson of long-standing character Alf Stewart (Ray Meagher). Flynn Saunders (Joel McIlroy) and Sally Fletcher (Kate Ritchie) also give him a home and foster him. Ric maintains various relationships during his time in the series. Early examples include romances with Cassie Turner (Sharni Vinson) and Belle Taylor (Jessica Tovey) and a prominent relationship with his best friend Matilda Hunter (Indiana Evans).

Ric has generally received favourable reviews from critics. Jim Schembri of The Age said Ric behaved in an "honourable manner" in his relationship with Matilda. Nick Levine of Digital Spy has praised his physical appearance, while Greg Hassal of The Sydney Morning Herald praised Ric's storylines. Though, Scott Ellis from the publication opined that Ric managed to annoy nearly every regular character featured in Home and Away. For his portrayal of Ric, Furze has been nominated for various accolades, some of which were in the categories of "Best Actor" and "Most Popular Actor".

== Casting ==
Actor Mark Furze joined the cast of Home and Away in 2004. Furze's agent informed him about the role and Furze read the character run through of Ric. He liked the role because he had never played a "baddie" before. After the initial audition process Furze was called back to carry out a screen test with Ray Meagher and Indiana Evans who play Alf Stewart and Matilda Hunter respectively. He was successful and Furze said he found the experience "very daunting" to begin with.

In 2007, Furze took part in singing contest Soapstar Superstar and insisted that he was staying at Home and Away for a while longer. However, in 2008 Furze revealed that he had left the serial to concentrate on a career in music.

== Character development ==
=== Characterisation ===
Eric Dalby is a bully and a troublemaker – and a clever one at that. This good-looking teen seems to have no respect for authority, or for the feelings of his victims. For him, causing trouble is a delicious pastime. It seems he's a chip off the old block! He grew up in Yabbie Creek as an only child. He and his mother Maggie were extremely close. She saw beyond his rebellious exterior to the playful, insecure boy beneath

— The official Home and Away website on Ric (2004).

Prior to his on-screen arrival, Ric's had an unhappy childhood and suffered abuse from his father Owen Dalby. This became a catalyst in forming his attitude problems. Initially the serial's official website said that Ric takes "great pleasure" in bullying those who he sees as vulnerable. However, after spending time in Summer Bay he changes his ways and becomes a "stand-up guy". Home and Away's overseas broadcaster, Five said that Ric managed to put "problematic past well and truly behind him" and got back "on the rails". Ric had "settled into a fairly typical routine for a lad of his age". They also described him as a "keen sportsman and is always up for a good time".

Furze has said that he is in some ways similar to Ric. Furze said that playing the same character over a long time period meant that Ric adopted his own traits. Though he proclaimed "I'm not as aggressive as him". Furze said that Ric's aggressive nature was "awesome" to portray. He opined that it made him one of the best characters as Ric always gets into fights, adding "it's great when he snaps at everyone". While Ric transforms into a "nice guy" and becomes "a bit soft", he retains his "crazy temper where he'll snap". Furze said he was okay with the changes to his persona and said that Ric's "good sides" to his persona would continue to develop. Furze state that he would prefer more "blokey" scenes for Ric so he would not end up being perceived as a "handbag".

=== Relationships ===
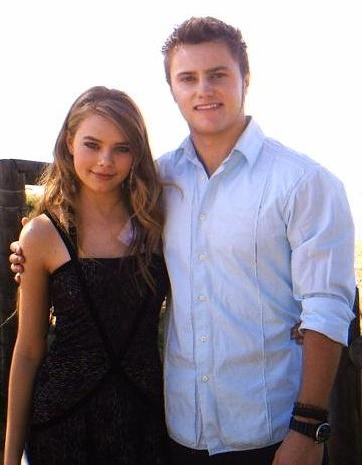
Indiana Evans and Mark Furze (pictured) play on-screen lovers Matilda and Ric.

Ric's early relationships are played out with the characters of Cassie Turner (Sharni Vinson) and Belle Taylor (Jessica Tovey). While dating Cassie, the "cheeky" Belle decides to "sabotage" Ric and Cassie's relationship. The storyline sees Belle attempting steal Ric from Cassie by seducing him and Tovey said that the storyline had comedic value. Producers later decided to end Ric's relationship with Cassie. Furze said that the scene involving their break up was "big". Furze and Vinson were not happy with the scene so requested changes from the scriptwriter. After which Furze said the scenes "went very well" and involved a dramatic element. They had to approach the scenes with "more powerful acting" and Furze was shocked at how emotional it became. He also opined that viewers felt thought the scenes were "intense and convincing".

Ric later begins a relationship with Matilda Hunter (Indiana Evans). Their early storylines focus of archetypal rites of passage. After Ric forgives Matilda for kissing Reuben Humpheries (Dan Ewing), she decides to move in with him to further their commitment. Furze said that Ric was uncomfortable with the move because Matilda is still at school and he fears they are moving too fast. Ric also questions whether she is doing it for right reasons. Ric and Matilda also have pregnancy scare, Ric discovers a pregnancy test and presumes it is Matilda's. Ric argues with Matilda and Furze he could understand Ric's reaction because he is still young. He added that "everything seems to be happening so fast" for Ric and Matilda. While Matilda soon reveals that she is not pregnant.

In August 2007, it was announced that Simone McAullay had joined the guest cast of Home and Away as Viv Anderson, an older woman who would seduce Ric. McAullay described Viv as a "sleazy" female with an "ulterior motive" who just turns up where ever Ric is and comes onto him. Viv tells Ric that she is in danger because of her husband, while Ric starts spending time with her. Matilda soon becomes jealous and when she presumes Ric is sleeping with Viv, she ends their relationship. Ric then visits Viv and ends up in bed with her. Furze said that Ric had never wanted to be unfaithful to Matilda and because he thinks Matilda does not want him and Viv makes it clear she does – "he has gone for it". McAullay opined that because Matilda had been accusing them of cheating for weeks, that Ric thinks he has nothing left to lose so he "might as well" sleep with Viv. She added that Ric is "completely devastated" the next morning, Viv realises sees the reality of the situation and "just how manipulative she has been – She's been completely inconsiderate of these young people’s lives."

While Ric and Matilda later reunite, the next part of the story arc begins and their happiness is short lived when Viv reveals that she is pregnant. Evans said that Matilda feels sorry for Viv and evens offers to support her. However, Matilda is already upset as it falls on the one year anniversary of her mother's death. Evans added that Matilda does not feel strong as she had always counted on Ric's support, but does not want to cause any further stress. Matilda is "left with nothing to hold onto" and Viv's pregnancy also makes her doubt that her relationship with Ric will survive. Though, Evans said "I don't think Matilda has doubts about Ric or their relationship, but because of the situation they're in, she doubts their future and whether they'll be able to stand strong." Furze said the story arc made their relationship worse because all Ric needed to do was offer Matilda his support.

Matilda decides to move to Perth to attend university, and asks a reluctant Ric to join her or she will end their relationship. Ric decides to stay in Summer Bay, so Matilda leaves. Furze said that while Matilda thought Ric would follow her, she had enough of supporting Ric through his "big life dramas". Matilda is angry that Ric is not prepared to support her with something "she wants to do for herself". Furze said that he disagreed with Ric and Matilda contemplating a long-distance relationship because their feelings for one another "are strong", not seeing each other would ruin their relationship. Ric becomes good friends with Kirsty Sutherland (Christie Hayes) and mistakenly kisses her. When another male answers Matilda's phone, Ric presumes she has moved on. Furze said it was a testament to Ric's character, presuming the worst. He added that Ric is "miserable" and even though he has a "great opportunity" working at the bait shop – "it doesn't mean anything without Matilda". Ric thinks seducing Kirsty will make himself feel better. Hayes said that Kirsty is supportive of Ric and attempts to repair Ric and Matilda's relationship. She added that "Ric is drawn to Kirsty because of her mature attitude to relationships", but Kirsty does not reciprocate to his kiss. Furze concluded that Ric was ultimately attempting cover up his feelings for Matilda. In their final storyline together, Ric and Matilda reunite in Perth and the storyline formed their exits from the serial.

=== Bare-knuckle boxing ===
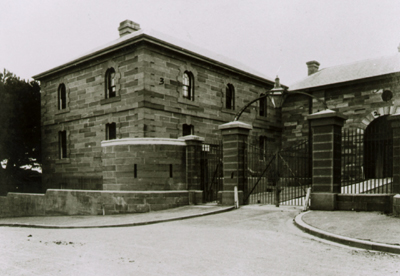
Scenes featuring Ric in prison were filmed at the Maitland Gaol, New South Wales.

Ric is often featured in various fight sequences the serial airs. In one storyline, a "violent encounter" with Rocco Cooper (Ian Meadows) lands Ric in prison facing a murder charge. While in prison Ric faces violence from his old enemy and Rocco's brother, Johnny Cooper (Callan Mulvey). Furze said it continued the theme of Ric constantly getting into fights. The scenes were filmed in November 2006 at the historic New South Wales prison, the Maitland Gaol. The scenes took four days to film and involved a number of the cast who were involved in Ric's story arc. Furze said if he was in charge, Ric would have been involved in fights every week on Home and Away. Furze predicted that Ric would be involved in many more fighting scenes because of his persona.

After Ric has an affair with Viv, she becomes pregnant. Furze's prediction proved true when Viv's husband Noel (Steven Vidler) forces Ric to take part in Bare-knuckle boxing. When Furze was first told that Ric would be involved in bare-knuckle fighting, Furze "did not hesitate" to agree to portray the issue. Furze said that he liked the idea of being involved in stunts and action sequences. Furze opined that the storyline was "in keeping with Ric's character" because he first entered the serial with "a chip on his shoulder". He felt that many other fictional characters that start out bad, reform to easy and that he did not want Ric's temperamental side to be sacrificed. In the research stage, professional boxer Anthony Mundine gave Furze advice and tips about the sport. Furze also had knowledge of boxing as he uses boxing as part of his fitness regime and also put in extra training at the gym.

On-screen Ric attempts to stop fighting, but has to "fight to save the life of his unborn child". If he refuses then Noel will to force Viv into an abortion. While Ric does not want the baby, "he will support whatever decision Viv makes" and Ric feels he has to go ahead with the fight. Noel is "desperate for Ric to fight" because he wants to give his punters the fight "they feel they deserve". Ric does not back down because he has a fear of "his manliness being brought into question". Furze said "Ric's not stupid; he knows he's at serious risk". Ric's opponent is Logan who has a grudge against Ric due to his links with gang member Johnny. Furze said that factor "could be the death of him – literally". At the same time, Ric is working alongside police officer Jack Holden (Paul O'Brien) to bring the illegal fights to an end. This heightens the element of danger in the plot, while Ric's girlfriend Matilda decides to stand by Ric because she thinks he is doing the right thing. When the police ruin their operation, Ric is forced to fight. The situation escalates and Furze said that "Ric finds himself being ordered to finish the fight at gunpoint. Noel wants him punished and it doesn't look good… Ric knows he's at serious risk."

The storyline cumulates when Ric starts working at a jewellery shop. The shop is then subjected to an armed robbery carried out by Kane Phillips (Sam Atwell). Ric's latest drama along with Viv's pregnancy and the illegal fights take a negative impact on Ric's health. Furze told TV Week that all three events leave Ric "shaken up" and unable to cope. It gets "too much and something in his head just snaps" and he suffers a panic attack. Ric knew he had been feeling stressed for a while. The serial used Ric's "standard tough-guy act" again which sees him blocking out the stress and "getting on with it". At this point in the story, Ric is brought to the realisation that "things have gone too far". Ric attends counselling sessions with Rachel Armstrong (Amy Mathews) and begins to get his life back together.

== Storylines ==
Ric arrives to attend Summer Bay High after he is expelled from his previous school in Yabbie Creek. Ric takes a dislike to Henry Hunter (Tobi Atkins) and starts to bully him because he likes dancing. Henry tries to make friends with Ric's circle of friends and Ric burns down the Surfclub Kiosk. He forces Henry to take the blame and is charged. Tasha Andrews (Isabel Lucas) plants details of a marijuana crop on Ric which lands him into trouble. Ric's father beats him up and Flynn Saunders (Joel McIlroy) notices that something is wrong. Ric pushes his father down the stairs and is injured; he then has a seizure at the Hunter's house. Morag Bellingham (Cornelia Frances) informs Ric that it is likely he will be charged with his father's murder. Ric runs away and hides in the city. Flynn attempts to track him down, but when Leah Patterson-Baker (Ada Nicodemou) and Dan Baker (Tim Campbell) are involved in a plane crash he helps them. Flynn detains Ric and reveals that Alf Stewart is his grandfather. The murder charges are dropped when his father's cause of death is confirmed to be a heart attack.

Ric agrees to move in with Alf, but Ric leaves when Alf thinks he is taking drugs. Ric reveals that he was taking insulin for his diabetes. Ric moves in with Flynn and Sally Fletcher (Kate Ritchie) and decides he wants to be known as Ric as opposed to Dalby or Eric. Matilda Hunter decides to forgive Ric for bullying her brother. She realises his bad temper is a result of his father's abuse and thinks he can change. They later kiss but Ric sees it as a bit of fun, Sally makes him realise that he should distance himself from her to save her feelings. Ric meets Cassie at the beach and they go skinny dipping. He keeps in contact with Cassie and she moves into Sally and Flynn's when her grandmother dies. The pair become close and begin a relationship. Ric becomes annoyed when his old friend Callan Sherman (Kain O'Keeffe) gets close to Matilda. He tries to prove that Callan is a drug user and also used date rape drugs on girls. Ric finds Callan after he drugs Matilda, Ric beats him up but Matilda is kidnapped. Matilda is rescued and Ric forces Callan to leave Summer Bay.

After Ric sleeps with Cassie, he becomes jealous of her spending time with an abuse sponsor. Cassie decides that Ric does not trust her and ends their relationship. Cassie starts dating Aden Jefferies (Todd Lasance) and Ric becomes jealous again. Aden's brother Sean (Gabriel Egan) beats Ric up which makes Cassie briefly get back with Ric. He decides to leave school and become an apprentice mechanic. He meets Belle and dates her. Ric starts getting bullied by Dom Moran (Sam North) who blames faults on Ric and pours acid over his legs. Dom later tampers with a car which crushes Ric, leading Dom's dismissal from his uncle Ray (Damien Garvey). Ric dumps Belle in favour of Cassie, but she cheats on Ric with her ex Macca MacKenzie (Trent Baines). Matilda supports Ric through the break up and they decide to start their own relationship. When Ric finds out that Rocco stabbed Sally, Ric beats him up. Rocco is later found dead and Ric is charged and found guilty of murder. In prison Rocco's brother Johnny seeks revenge. Matilda and Lucas Holden (Rhys Wakefield) visit Johnny and trick him into admitting involvement in Rocco's death. The police are forced to let Ric out.

Ric and Matilda have a few arguments over trust and believing that she kissed Reuben. Ric is upset when Matilda decides to attend a university far from home. He decides to go with her and is worried that Matilda is pregnant when he finds a test. She reveals it is not hers and they agree they are not ready for children. Matilda walks out of her exams leaving Ric's hope for a new life elsewhere ruined. Ric starts to receive texts from one of his garage clients named Viv. Viv tries to kiss Ric who tells her he is not interested. They bond when he shares his problems about Matilda. Ric tells Viv he cannot see her after Matilda becomes jealous, but Matilda sees them kiss. Viv's husband Noel arrives, she comes onto Ric again and Noel starts threatening Ric for helping Viv out. Matilda dumps Ric who then decides to sleep with Viv. She then discovers that she is pregnant and Noel tells Ric that he cannot have children and they used him to gain a child. Ric and Matilda get back together and Johnny escapes from prison and holds them hostage. Sam Holden (Jessica Chapnik) saves them by murdering Johnny. Noel asks Ric to participate in bare knuckle fighting in exchange for money, but Ric refuses. Ric is then fired from his job, refused employment from several other businesses, has his vehicle set on fire and Sally's furniture is stolen from her home. When Ric realises Noel is behind it he is forced to take part in a fight. Matilda realises that Ric is fighting due to his gain of wealth and facial bruising.

When Ric is badly beaten at his next fight, Rachel decides not to inform the police. Viv tells Ric the baby may have disabilities and is unsure going ahead with the pregnancy. Noel blackmails Ric to take part in another fight or risk the health of his child. Ric contacts the police who convince him to go ahead with the fight to get the details. Noel discovers that Viv is trying to leave him and postpones the fight; the police arrive to arrest Noel who is in possession of a gun. Viv later loses the baby and Matilda arranges a memorial. Ric gets a job as a security guard where Kane later raids with a gun. Ric starts to suffer from panic attacks afterward and Rachel diagnoses him with severe stress. Matilda is offered a place in university in Perth and asks Ric to move with her. Ric decides not to but they discuss ways of making their relationship work. They split up when they realise it is not practical. Alf realises that Ric is miserable without Matilda and buys him a one-way ticket to Perth. Ric and Matilda reunite and agree to spend their lives together.

== Reception ==
"Ric Dalby is Home And Away's resident hothead, the character most likely to wind up in a fight, be caught kissing the wrong girl or just generally land himself in trouble [...] he's had differences of opinion or just plain fist fights with a score of Summer Bay locals and drifters, he's managed to annoy most of the regular characters and after one particularly violent encounter even wound up in jail facing a murder charge."

— Scott Ellis of The Sydney Morning Herald on Ric. (2008)

For his portrayal of Ric, Furze was nominated for in the "Most Popular Actor" category at the 2007 Logie Awards. He was nominated in the same category the following year's ceremony. Furze said the recognition was an honour and opined that it reaffirmed that he was doing a good job on the serial. At the 2007 Inside Soap Awards Furze was nominated for "Best Actor". He subsequently received a nomination for "Sexiest Male" at the 2008 Digital Spy Soap Awards

Jim Schembri of The Age said that the serial's male characters often behave in an "honourable manner". He said that Ric acted with "nobility" when he told Matilda they did not have to rush into sex. Schembri opined that any other male would have said this after sex and "given her a fake mobile number". While Greg Hassal from The Sydney Morning Herald said the episode was "well written and performed" and said the plot was a "perennial issue" for the serial to portray. They added with storylines such as those gave an indication to why Home and Away gained viewers.

Analysing Ric's jealous trait, Roz Laws from the Sunday Mercury said "it's all of five minutes before his jealousy gets the better of him, yet again" upon arriving in Perth to reunite with Matilda. She also said that Home and Away fans should just tune in to see Ric's "toned torso" and said it was a "bad move" to take on one of Johnny's gang members in a fight. Ric's appearance was popular with entertainment website Digital Spy in their gay feature. They branded him "fit Ric" and said that Ric "goes a bit Fight Club" during his bare knuckle fight storyline. TV Week ran a poll asking viewers who their favourite Home and Away couple was. Ric and Matilda received eight percent of the vote, placing them in joint third place along with Tony Holden (Jon Sivewright) and Rachel Armstrong.
