= Robbie Hunter (Home and Away) =

- Home and Away character
- Portrayed by: Jason Smith
- Duration: 2003–2006
- First appearance: 25 November 2003
- Last appearance: 10 October 2006
- Introduced by: Julie McGauran
In-universe information
- Occupation: Student; Actor
- Father: Jack Hunter
- Mother: Beth Hunter
- Stepfather: Rhys Sutherland
- Brothers: Scott Hunter; Henry Hunter
- Sisters: Kit Hunter; Matilda Hunter
- Wife: Tasha Andrews (2006–)
- Daughters: Ella Hunter
- Grandfathers: Graham Walters
- Nephews: Noah Hunter; Archie Hunter Hyde

Robert George "Robbie" Hunter is a fictional character from the Australian soap opera Home and Away, played by Jason Smith. He made his first on screen appearance on 25 November 2003. Robbie's storylines have included adjusting to a new stepfamily, a HIV scare, his relationship and subsequent marriage to Tasha Andrews, standing trial for the murder of his grandfather and becoming a father. Robbie departed on 10 October 2006.

== Casting ==
Chris Hemsworth originally auditioned for the role of Robbie, but the producers decided that he was not right for the part. They later cast him as Kim Hyde. Smith then won the role of Robbie. Of his casting, the actor told the official Home and Away website "I really enjoyed the audition process because my character is so full of life. If there was any role on television I wanted to play this would be it." Smith felt coming into a well established show with a strong cast was a good opportunity for him.

== Storylines ==
Robbie arrives in Summer Bay to live with Beth and her husband-to-be Rhys Sutherland (Michael Beckley). Within the first day of his arrival, he manages to put his future stepsister Jade's (Kate Garven) nose out of joint by mistaking her for her sister, Kirsty (Christie Hayes). Robbie then apologises and Jade accepts.

When Tasha Andrews (Isabel Lucas) goes missing, Robbie uses one of his inventions to catch her but it backfires, leaving him caught. While trying to escape, Robbie is bitten by a snake and Tasha runs for help. After saving his life, Robbie gives Tasha a gift and they become good friends often getting into trouble including incidents of streaking and wagging school. When Kim Hyde (Chris Hemsworth) starts at Summer Bay High in Robbie's Year, they become friends but it quickly sours after Robbie learns Kim has been kissing Tasha. Tasha, after realising she cannot have two boyfriends, reassures Robbie he is the one for her and they reconcile and Robbie repairs his friendship with Kim.

For Robbie's 17th birthday, he receives a car to his surprise as he feels that he would never be trusted after wrecking Tasha's guardian Irene Roberts' (Lynne McGranger). At Robbie's party which he shares with Hayley Smith (Bec Cartwright) for her 21st, the keys are stolen and the culprit is Duncan Stewart (Brendan McKensy), who causes a major accident involving Jade and her boyfriend Seb Miller (Mitch Firth). Robbie later finds himself embroiled with a feud with Duncan when he begins harassing and blackmailing Tasha with the knowledge that the late Angie Russell (Laurie Foell) is her mother and Robbie lashes out. The feud comes to a head after Duncan pulls a gun on Robbie and Kim and later leaves the Bay.

Robbie and Tasha decide to take their relationship to the next level, but Robbie is unable to perform which sets the couple back. They later resolves things and become stronger and Robbie supports Tasha when her birth father Ian Osborne rejects her. During a nude run as part of a dare on a camping trip, Robbie suffers a needlestick injury and fears he has contracted something from the needle and keeps it a secret.

Robbie's behaviour becomes erratic, prompting concern from his friends and family and local doctor and counsellor Flynn Saunders (Joel McIlroy) organises an intervention to make Robbie see how much he is hurting those who care about him. Robbie's test results later arrive and they are negative.

Robbie and Tasha drift apart once again but after a seaplane crash, they once again reaffirm their commitment. After submitting an advert for a competition, Robbie soon lands a role in a donut commercial and but is crushed when his voice is overdubbed in the final airing. In spite of this, Robbie achieves some degree of fame and becomes a little conceited, angering Tasha when he tells his co-stars she is a groupie as opposed to his girlfriend. Robbie and Tasha decide to wait until they get married before they have sex and make a vow of celibacy. They then have an unofficial private ceremony under the stars.

When Tasha from returns visiting her half-brother Dylan Russell (Brett Maitland-Hicks) in the city, she introduces a new friend, Jonah Abraham (James Mitchell). It soon transpires that Jonah is part of a religious cult called the Believers. Robbie is reluctant to believe that the Believers are legitimate, but Jonah and his friend Charity Fernbrook soon convince him and Tasha to join their commune in accordance with the spiritual teachings of Jonah's mother and the leader of the Believers, Mumma Rose (Linden Wilkinson).

Irene, along with Jack Holden (Paul O'Brien) and Martha MacKenzie (Jodi Gordon) do some digging to find out about the Believers. They find that there was a girl in Queensland who claimed that the Believers and Jonah had tried to impregnate her before she escaped them. After this revelation, Robbie is convinced but Tasha refuses to listen and stays with the cult after Robbie's ultimatum.

During a cyclone, Robbie returns to the commune to alert Tasha of the impending danger. As the storm increases, Robbie is stranded with the Believers. After the storm ceases, Tasha tells Robbie to leave and he does, only to be pushed into a river and clings onto a branch for dear life. Jonah and Tasha arrive on the scene and Jonah offers his hand but is unable to hold on to Robbie and is swept away. Miraculously Robbie survives.

Desperate to get Tasha to see sense, Robbie turns to mayor Josh West (Daniel Collopy) for help but Josh does nothing to stop the Believers and conducts shady deals with them. On top of this, Robbie's grandfather Graham Walters (Doug Scroope) suffers a heart attack and lets his family know that he wants his life support machine switched off. Amanda Vale (Holly Brisley), Graham's new wife contests the decision and Robbie, outraged, grants his grandfather's wish and secretly turns the machine off.

When Tasha escapes the Believers, Robbie is happy to have her back and the couple prepare to marry for real. On the day of the wedding, Tasha collapses and it is revealed she is pregnant. Tasha reveals that Mumma Rose had Jonah drug and rape her in order to produce a child. Robbie goes to the jail to confront Jonah but is removed by security. Robbie then agrees to look after Tasha and be the father her baby needs.

After news of Josh's murder reaches the Bay, Robbie and Tasha join the list of suspects. When the evidence starts to point to Tasha, Robbie takes drastic action and destroys the surveillance tapes which place her at the scene. Tasha admits she did take a shot at Josh and he went down but the bullet missed and this is confirmed in the ballistics report. Both confess to the shooting to protect each other but the real culprit is revealed to be Barry Hyde (Ivar Kants).

When an explosion occurs at Jack and Martha's wedding reception, Robbie and several others suffer minor burns and are immediately transported to a hospital in the city via helicopter. The helicopter crashes, leaving everyone stranded for several weeks. After suffering extreme dehydration and fearing he will die, Robbie confesses to Martha that he switched off Graham's machine. They are eventually rescued.

Following a final confrontation with Mumma Rose, who tries to kidnap Tasha's newborn baby daughter, Ella, Robbie stands trial with Morag Bellingham (Cornelia Frances) representing him. Despite Morag's best efforts in defence, Robbie is found guilty but the judge rules that he will serve no jail time and is free to go. Tasha's relative Josie sends her and Robbie tickets to join her in Boston and after saying farewell to all their friends and family, they leave for the United States.

== Reception ==
For his portrayal of Robbie, Smith was nominated for "Most Popular New Male Talent" at the 2005 Logie Awards.
