= Josie Russell =

Josie Russell may refer to:

- Josie Russell (Home and Away), fictional character from Australian TV soap opera Home and Away
- Josie Russell, British woman who, as a child, was attacked by Michael Stone but survived
