= Logie Award for Most Popular New Male Talent =

Award

- Country: Australia
- Presented by: TV Week
- First award: 1999
- Final award: 2013
- Website: www.tvweeklogieawards.com.au

The Silver Logie for Most Popular New Male Talent was an award presented at the Australian TV Week Logie Awards. It was first awarded at the 41st Annual TV Week Logie Awards ceremony, held in 1999. The award is given to honour a standout performance of a new male talent on an Australian program. It may or may not be his first television appearance, however it is his first major television role. The winner and nominees of Most Popular New Male Talent were chosen by the public through an online voting survey on the TV Week website. This award category was eliminated in 2014 and replaced by the gender non-specific category, Most Popular New Talent. Home and Away has the most recipients of this award, with a total of seven wins, followed by Neighbours with two wins.

== Winners and nominees ==
Key	Meaning
‡	Indicates the winner

Year	Nominees	Program(s)	Network	Ref
1999	Daniel MacPherson‡	Neighbours	Network Ten	
1999	Paul Bishop	Blue Heelers	Seven Network	
1999	Troy Dann	Outback Adventures with Troy Dann	Seven Network	
1999	Graeme Squires	Home and Away	Seven Network	
2000	Justin Melvey‡	Home and Away	Seven Network	
2000	Rove McManus	Rove	Network Ten	
2000	James O'Loughlin	Inside the Arena	Arena	
2000	Cameron Welsh	Home and Away	Seven Network	
2001	Jamie Durie‡	Backyard Blitz	Nine Network	
2001	Beau Brady	Home and Away	Seven Network	
2001	Chris Egan	Home and Away	Seven Network	
2001	Ben Steel	Home and Away	Seven Network	
2002	Ditch Davey‡	Blue Heelers	Seven Network	
2002	Conrad Coleby	All Saints	Seven Network	
2002	Martin Dingle-Wall	Home and Away	Seven Network	
2002	Blair McDonough	Neighbours	Network Ten	
2002	Danny Raco	Home and Away	Seven Network	
2003	Patrick Harvey‡	Neighbours	Network Ten	
2003	Jay Bunyan	Neighbours	Network Ten	
2003	Daniel Collopy	Home and Away	Seven Network	
2003	Michael Dorman	The Secret Life of Us	Network Ten	
2003	Ben Mortley	McLeod's Daughters	Nine Network	
2004	Kip Gamblin‡	Home and Away	Seven Network	
2004	Dr. Chris Brown	Harry's Practice	Seven Network	
2004	Daniel Frederiksen	Stingers	Nine Network	
2004	Andrew O'Keefe	Deal or No Deal	Seven Network	
2004	Luke van Dyck	DIY Rescue	Nine Network	
2004	Luke van Dyck	Renovation Rescue	Nine Network	
2005	Chris Hemsworth‡	Home and Away	Seven Network	
2005	Ben Nicholas	Neighbours	Network Ten	
2005	Dean O'Gorman	McLeod's Daughters	Nine Network	
2005	Jason Smith	Home and Away	Seven Network	
2005	Wil Traval	All Saints	Seven Network	
2006	Paul O'Brien‡	Home and Away	Seven Network	
2006	Adam Hills	Spicks and Specks	ABC	
2006	Dan O'Connor	Neighbours	Network Ten	
2006	Jonny Pasvolsky	McLeod's Daughters	Nine Network	
2006	Rhys Wakefield	Home and Away	Seven Network	
2007	Dustin Clare‡	McLeod's Daughters	Nine Network	
2007	Ben Lawson	Neighbours	Network Ten	
2007	Bobby Morley	Home and Away	Seven Network	
2007	Chris Sadrinna	Home and Away	Seven Network	
2007	Andrew Supanz	All Saints	Seven Network	
2008	Lincoln Lewis‡	Home and Away	Seven Network	
2008	Jack Campbell	All Saints	Seven Network	
2008	Sam Clark	Neighbours	Network Ten	
2008	David Lyons	Sea Patrol	Nine Network	
2008	Stuart MacGill	Stuart MacGill Uncorked	The LifeStyle Channel	
2009	Hugh Sheridan‡	Packed to the Rafters	Seven Network	
2009	Dean Geyer	Neighbours	Network Ten	
2009	George Houvardas	Packed to the Rafters	Seven Network	
2009	Matt Lee	So You Think You Can Dance Australia	Network Ten	
2009	Jordan Rodrigues	Home and Away	Seven Network	
2010	Luke Mitchell‡	Home and Away	Seven Network	
2010	Charlie Pickering	The 7pm Project	Network Ten	
2010	Matt Preston	MasterChef Australia	Network Ten	
2010	James Stewart	Packed to the Rafters	Seven Network	
2010	Josh Thomas	Talkin' 'Bout Your Generation	Network Ten	
2011	Firass Dirani‡	Underbelly: The Golden Mile	Nine Network	
2011	Charles Cottier	Home and Away	Seven Network	
2011	Eddie Perfect	Offspring	Network Ten	
2011	Manu Feildel	My Kitchen Rules	Seven Network	
2011	Ryan Corr	Packed to the Rafters	Seven Network	
2012	Steve Peacocke‡	Home and Away	Seven Network	
2012	Dan Ewing	Home and Away	Seven Network	
2012	Peter Kuruvita	My Sri Lanka with Peter Kuruvita	SBS	
2012	James Mason	Neighbours	Network Ten	
2012	Tom Wren	Winners & Losers	Seven Network	
2013	Joel Madden	The Voice Australia	Nine Network	
2013	Alex Williams	Underground: The Julian Assange Story	Network Ten	
2013	David Campbell	Mornings	Nine Network	
2013	Robert Irwin	Steve Irwin's Wildlife Warriors	Network Ten	
2013	Will McDonald	Home and Away	Seven Network	

== Multiple wins/nominations ==
Number	Program
Wins
7	Home and Away
2	Neighbours
Number	Program
Nominations
23	Home and Away
10	Neighbours
4	All Saints
4	McLeod's Daughters
4	Packed to the Rafters
2	Blue Heelers

== See also ==
- George Wallace Memorial Logie for Best New Talent
- Graham Kennedy Award for Most Outstanding Newcomer
- Logie Award for Most Popular New Female Talent
- Logie Award for Most Popular New Talent
