= Linden Wilkinson =

Australian actress and writer

- Born: Australia
- Education: National Institute of Dramatic Art (BFA)
- Occupations: Actress, writer
- Years active: 1978–present

Linden Wilkinson is an Australian film, television, and theatre actress, and a playwright and screenwriter. She is perhaps best known for her recurring role in soap opera Home and Away playing 'The Believers' cult leader Mumma Rose. Her other roles include appearances on Prisoner: Cell Block H, A Country Practice, Water Rats, and Packed to the Rafters. Wilkinson spends most of her time acting in and writing theatre productions.

Wilkinson has worked extensively in State Theatre Companies in Adelaide, Melbourne and Auckland, some of her theatre credits are A Day in December, Family Favourites, Happy House Show, Nice Girls and Night of the Missing Bridegroom. She began writing and script-editing for television series such as Ocean Girl and Outriders, and she has also written for two feature films, Moon River, an adaptation of the novel by Brenda Walker of the same name, and Pearls, a romantic comedy.

== Filmography ==
=== Film ===
Year	Title	Role	Notes
2024	Crossroads	Woman	Shorts
2022	Svengali	Marion Clark	
2022	Here Out West	Bronwyn	
2018	The Mistress of the Forest	Karen Richardson	
2000	The Monkey's Mask	Mrs Norris	
2000	Looking for Alibrandi	Mrs Barton	
1999	Me Myself I	Pamela's Mother	
1997	The Wedding Party	Poppy	
1995	Vacant Possession	Kate	
1994	Mary: The Mary MacKillop Story	Older Mary MacKillop	
1986	For Love Alone	Miss Haviland	
1984	My First Wife	Doctor	
1978	Third Person Plural	Danny	

Television

Year	Title	Roles	Notes
2025	The Last Anniversary	Elizabeth Finch	1 episode
2022	Significant Others	Gaynor	1 episode
2022	Romp	Wendy	TV series
2013	Dance Academy	Barb	1 episode
2009-10	Packed to the Rafters	Linda Bannon	2 episodes
1996-06	Home and Away	Katherine Walker / Mumma Rose	23 episodes
2000	Marriage Acts	Miriam Hawkins	TV movie
2000	All Saints	Helen Upton	1 episode
1993-99	Water Rats	Moira Randall / Elaine	3 episodes
1999	Murder Call	Rose	1 episode
1997	Heartbreak High	Mrs Swain	1 episode
1996	Fires	Ms Black	1 episode
1996	Naked: Stories of Men	Ren	1 episode
1995	Bordertown	Mrs Pepper	1 episode
1994	GP	Daphne Bond	1 episode
1994	Escape from Jupiter	Beth	13 episodes
1993	E Street	Dave	1 episode
1993	Police Rescue	Mrs Glasel	1 episode
1993	The Leaving of Liverpool	Mrs Hawkins	TV movie
1993	Seven Deadly Sins		TV series
1992	The Time Game	Helen Johnson	TV movie
1987-92	A Country Practice	Meg / Trish	5 episodes
1989-92	Dearest Enemy	Alex Taylor	14 episodes
1991	Rafferty's Rules	Angela	1 episode
1991	Raider of the South Seas	Elspeth Morrison	
1990	The Paper Man	Carla	2 episodes
1990	Come in Spinner	Barbara	4 episodes
1988	Princess Kate	Margot	TV movie
1988	Alterations	Martha	TV movie
1986	Winners	Elise	1 episode
1985	One Summer Again	Kathleen	TV series
1981-83	Prisoner	Pauline Carter / Nurse	7 episodes
1980-82	Cop Shop	Lynn / Lorraine	2 episodes
1980	Water Under The Bridge	Ida Flagg	6 episodes
1979-81	Skyways	Jill	1 episode

== Theatre ==
Year	Title	Role	Notes	Refs
2024	The Arrogance	Director		
2022	Grand Horizons	Ensemble	Roslyn Packer Theatre	
2017	Lip Service	Arden	Ensemble Theater	
2016	Shake & Stir	Nelly Dean	The Playhouse, Canberra	
2012	Biddies	Miss Cantwell	Her Majesty's Theatre	
