= Paul O'Brien (actor) =

Australian actor

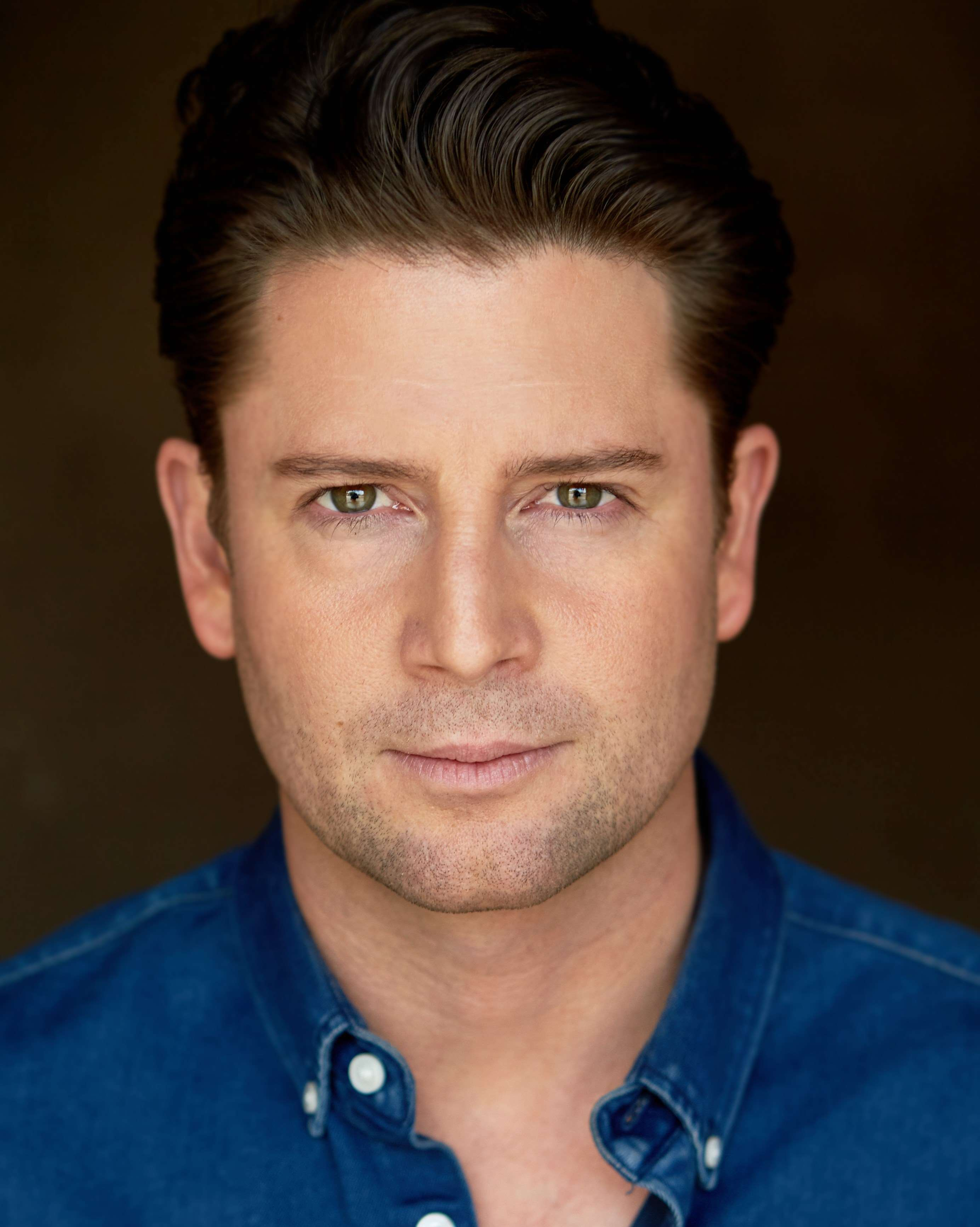
- Born: 14 April 1978 (age 48); South Africa
- Occupation: Actor
- Years active: 2004–present

Paul O'Brien (born 14 April 1978) is a South African-Australian actor, known for his role as Jack Holden in the television soap opera Home and Away, for which he won the Logie Award for Most Popular New Male Talent in 2006.

== Early life ==
O'Brien was born in South Africa. Growing up, he lived in South Africa, Mauritius and Australia, before his family settled on the Gold Coast. He has a brother and a sister. O'Brien was a chef, before he moved to Melbourne when he was 21 to pursue a career in acting. While searching for work, he performed stand-up comedy and starred in various short films and stage productions.

== Career ==
O'Brien made his stage debut in a production of Julia Britton's Five Minute Call at The Butterfly Club in 2004. He joined the cast of soap opera Home and Away as police constable Jack Holden in 2005. O'Brien relocated to Sydney from Melbourne for the role. One of his character's most notable storylines was an on-again-off-again romance with Jodi Gordon's Martha Mackenzie. For his portrayal of Jack, O'Brien won the Logie Award for Most Popular New Male Talent in 2006, and was further nominated for Most Popular Actor in 2007 and 2008. He was named the runner-up, behind comedian Andy Lee, in the 2006 Cleo Bachelor of the Year competition.

In 2008, O'Brien took part in the third series of It Takes Two, an Australian reality show in which celebrities compete against each other by singing. O'Brien was partnered with pop singer Jade MacRae and they finished in fourth position. O'Brien left Home and Away in 2008 and his character was killed off, with his last scenes airing in early 2009. After leaving the serial, O'Brien joined the cast of Underbelly Files: Tell Them Lucifer was Here as murdered police officer Rodney Miller. Fellow Home and Away actor Todd Lasance also starred in the series, but O'Brien said he did not think their characters' paths would cross.

O'Brien began to pursue a film career, beginning with a part in John Doe: Vigilante (dir. Kelly Dolen) before securing the role of ex-assassin Ryan Teller in Message Man (dir. Corey Pearson).

In October 2013, it was announced that he had joined the cast of Neighbours in the guest role of Eric Edwards. O'Brien starred in The Subjects (dir. Robert Mond), short films Peacekeeper and Without A Shirt, before appearing in Project Eden: Vol I as Agent Williams.

In December 2017, O'Brien was cast as the lead opposite John Jarrett in the Christmas comedy Christmas Down Under, directed by Louis Mandylor. Christmas Down Under was released in 2018. In 2018, O'Brien was cast opposite Catherine Bell in Hallmark's A Summer to Remember. That same year, he starred in the Indonesia set film Message Man as a ruthless hitman who comes out of retirement to avenge a poor Indonesian family who are being terrorized by modern-day child slavers.

In March 2023, O'Brien began shooting the Australian feature film The Gorge in Queensland, alongside fellow Home and Away actor Lincoln Lewis.

== Paul O'Brien Acting ==
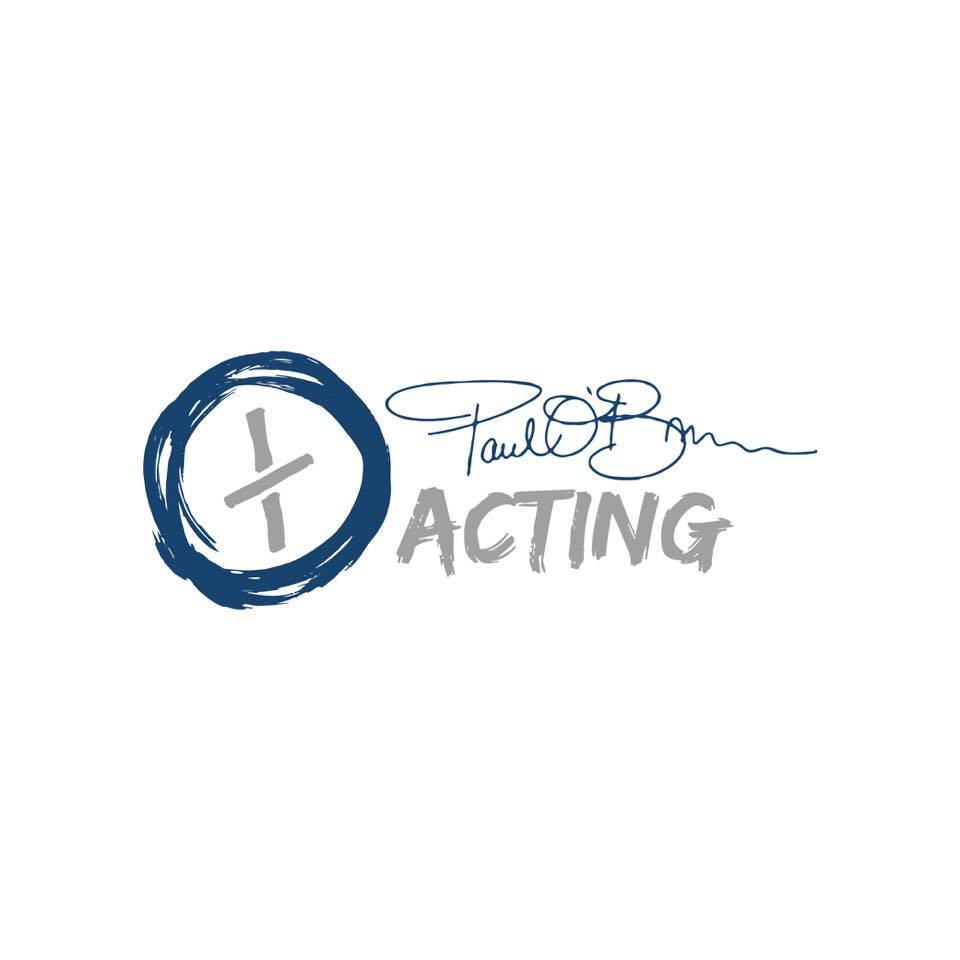
Logo for Paul O'Brien Acting

O'Brien launched his acting school, Paul O'Brien Acting, to help actors become working actors. O'Brien felt that a lot of what was taught to him was outdated or redundant in the world of film and television acting.

Based in South Yarra, Victoria, O'Brien has helped many of his students get agents, get auditions and book roles. He stands by the Flow Technique as being the most effective approach to acting and auditions.

== Filmography ==
=== Television appearances ===
Year	Title	Role	Notes
2005	Last Man Standing	Art Director	1 episode
2005–2009	Home and Away	Jack Holden	Series regular
2011	Underbelly Files: Tell Them Lucifer was Here	Senior Constable Rodney Miller	Supporting role
2013	Neighbours	Eric Edwards	Guest role
2015	Jack and Frankl Act 1	Jack	TV movie
2015	Tate	Ken	TV series
2018	A Summer to Remember	Trevor	TV movie
2021	Wombat & Goose	The Postie	1 episode

=== Film appearances ===
Year	Title	Role	Notes
2023	The Gorge	David	Short
2022	The Spy Who Never Dies	Brad	
2021	Christmas Down Under	Aaron Parker	
2018	Message Man	Ryan Teller	Lead
2017	Project Eden: Vol I	Agent Williams	Supporting
2016	Anon. Trailer Music II	Grieving Artist	Short
2016	You Never Know	David	Short
2016	Without a Shirt	The Postie	Short
2015	The Subjects	John	Lead
2014	Peacekeeper	Peacekeeper	Short
2014	John Doe: Vigilante	Officer Jack Callahan	Supporting
2012	Pacific Cove	Corey	Short
2011	Faces	Markus	Short
2011	The Family Mills	Nathan Mills	Short
2011	Deep	Rocky	Short
2009	Sweet Marshall	Joseph	
2009	The Damned United	Paul Thompson	
2008	The Life o'Simon	Gerald	
2006	Love is a Square	Mark	Short
2006	Sick to the Vitals	George	Short
2005	Parallels	Blue Suit	

== Awards and nominations ==
Year	Award	Category	Nominated work	Result
2006	48th Logie Awards	Most Popular New Male Talent	Home and Away	Won
2007	49th Logie Awards	Most Popular Actor	Home and Away	Nominated
2008	50th Logie Awards	Most Popular Actor	Home and Away	Nominated
2016	3rd Connect Film Festival	Jury Prize for Best Ensemble Acting Award (shared with the cast)	Peacekeeper	Nominated
