= Flynn Saunders =

- Home and Away character
- Joel McIlroy as Flynn Saunders
- Portrayed by: Martin Dingle-Wall (2001–02); Joel McIlroy (2003–06)
- Duration: 2001–06
- First appearance: 22 June 2001
- Last appearance: 13 February 2006
- Introduced by: John Holmes
In-universe information
- Occupation: Doctor; Counsellor; Caravan Park owner; Foster parent
- Father: John Saunders
- Mother: Rachel Saunders
- Sisters: Ashley Saunders
- Wife: Sally Fletcher (2003–06)
- Daughters: Pippa Saunders

Flynn Saunders is a fictional character from the Australian soap opera Home and Away, played by Martin Dingle-Wall from 2001 until 2002 and by Joel McIlroy from 2003 to 2006 . He first appeared in the episode broadcast on 22 June 2001 and died on 13 February 2006.

== Development ==
Flynn was a doctor and social worker, who arrived in Summer Bay after leaving the city in search of his missing sister Ashley Saunders (Zoe Ella). When Flynn learns there is a job available at the local drop-in centre, he decided to take it and wait for his sister to pass through the town. Dingle-Wall told an Inside Soap writer, "Finding Ashley is number one on Flynn's agenda. She has a drug problem, and could have gone anywhere. But Flynn thinks she may have been heading for the Bay, and he's hoping to be there if, and when, she arrives." Shelley Sutherland (Paula Forrest), who ran the centre, was pleased to have him working there. He got off to a bad start with Shauna Bradley (Kylie Watson) and Brodie Hanson (Susie Rugg), whom he chased down the beach after mistaking her for Ashley.

== Storylines ==
Flynn first arrives in the Bay to help Shelly Sutherland out at the Sarah McKay drop-in centre as a counsellor. It is soon revealed a few weeks after that he is also a trained doctor. Flynn soon falls for Sally Fletcher (Kate Ritchie) and on their first date, they share a picnic together. Shauna Bradley makes a pass at Flynn but he rebuffs her. Jude Lawson (Ben Steel), Shauna's boyfriend is upset and rides off on his motorcycle and crashes. When Jude is brought into hospital, Flynn works with fellow doctor Charlotte Adams (Stephanie Chaves-Jacobsen) to save his life in surgery and they are successful.

Flynn later searches for his younger sister, Ashley, when their father, John (Bill Charlton), tells him she has gone missing. She is found living rough on the streets and after initial reluctance, returns home. Following a holiday, Flynn and Sally make engagement plans and marry in an outdoor ceremony conducted by Donald Fisher (Norman Coburn). In 2004, The couple swap houses with Beth Hunter (Clarissa House) and move back into Summer Bay House, Sally's childhood home and take over the running of the caravan park. They then welcome the arrival of their first child, Pippa (Tameka and Bojana Main) via friend and surrogate Leah Patterson (Ada Nicodemou). Flynn and Sally take in homeless teenagers Ric Dalby (Mark Furze) and Cassie Turner (Sharni Vinson) and they form a close bond with them.

In late 2005, Flynn is diagnosed with terminal skin cancer which has spread to other areas of his body and is told he only has three months to live. After deciding against chemotherapy, Flynn faces a tough moment when he tells Sally that he wants to take his own life, in order to save himself the pain and humiliation of dying a slow death but Flynn realises how precious his final weeks are and decides to die naturally. When Flynn encounters runaway Belle Taylor (Jessica Tovey), she knocks him over while fleeing, exacerbating his weakened state. Flynn spends his final hours reminiscing with Sally, Ric, Cassie and Alf Stewart (Ray Meagher) over photos and memories. Flynn shares one last dance with Sally before dying in her arms.

== Reception ==
For his portrayal of Flynn, Dingle-Wall received a nomination for the Logie Award for Most Popular New Male Talent and the Inside Soap Award for Best Newcomer in 2002. While McIlroy earned a nomination for Most Popular Actor at the Logie Awards of 2006 for his portrayal of the character. McIlroy also received three nominations at the 2006 Inside Soap Awards for Best Actor, Best Couple (shared with Ritchie), and Best Storyline for Flynn's death. The episode featuring Flynn's death won writer, Sam Meikle, the Australian Writers' Guild Award for Best Episode in a Television Serial in 2006. Flynn's death was also voted the second most gripping storyline in a TV Week reader's poll in December 2006.

An Inside Soap columnist branded the character "handsome" and "dashing". Of the recast, Matt Bramford of What's on TV stated "It's quite obvious to everyone that Home and Away didn't even TRY to find someone who looked like Martin Dingle-Wall when he left Summer Bay in 2002. Instead they cast Joel McIlroy..." Debi Enker of The Age thought Sally and Flynn's wedding "could well be the soap wedding of the year."
