= Sharni Vinson =

Australian-American actress, dancer (born 1983)

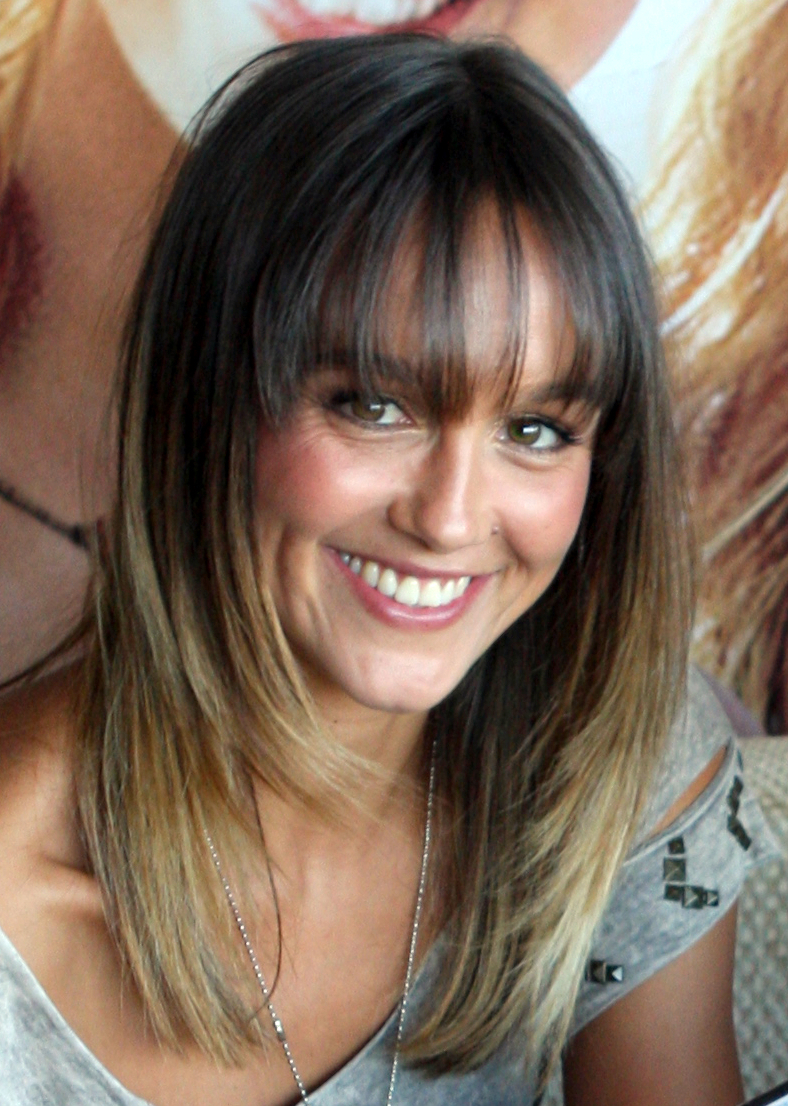
- Vinson in 2011
- Born: 22 July 1983 (age 43); Sydney, New South Wales, Australia
- Citizenship: Australia; United States
- Occupations: Actress; dancer
- Years active: 2001–present

Sharni Vinson (born 22 July 1983) is an Australian and American actress and dancer. She is known for her roles in the television soap opera Home and Away, and in the films Step Up 3D (2010), You're Next (2011) and Bait 3D (2012).

== Early life ==
Born in Sydney, Vinson grew up in the southern beach suburb of Cronulla. As a teenager, she trained and competed at a national level in swimming, holding four state records throughout high school. She began singing, dancing and acting at a young age, becoming the third generation in her family of performers; in 1945, her grandmother was the youngest ballerina to be offered a scholarship in the Borovansky Ballet Company. At age twelve, Vinson enrolled at the Brent Street School of Performing Arts in Sydney.

== Career ==
Vinson entered the entertainment industry as a musician. At 17, she and three other young women formed the pop/R&B group Foxfire IV. Their sole single, "Roses", peaked at number 47 on the ARIA charts. They disbanded shortly thereafter.

Vinson made her acting debut portraying minor characters in two episodes of the Australian soap opera Home and Away in 2001 and 2003. She left an impression on the show's casting agent, who recommended her for a regular role on the series. She initially auditioned for the role of Martha MacKenzie, but was cast as Cassie Turner, a troubled teenager who is taken into foster care after numerous run-ins with the police. She quickly proved popular with the show's audience and was nominated for "Most Popular New Female Talent" at the Logie Awards of 2006.

In July 2007, speculation arose that Vinson intended to leave the series to pursue an acting career in Los Angeles and that November she confirmed that she would indeed be leaving the series. Her final appearance was on 2 April 2008.

The following year, Vinson made her American television debut on the TBS sitcom My Boys. She has since appeared on a number of other American network television series such as NCIS and CSI: NY alongside former boyfriend A.J. Buckley. She also made a guest appearance on the final season of the CBS Crime television series Cold Case, which aired in 2010, and in the music video for Matchbox Twenty's "Put Your Hands Up".

In March 2009, Vinson was cast as Natalie, the female lead in Step Up 3D, the third installment of the Step Up film series. It was her highest-profile role since relocating to America. Filming took place in New York City. Despite mixed reviews, the film was the trilogy's most successful installment, grossing over $159 million worldwide.

Vinson's follow-up role was in Universal Pictures Straight-to-DVD film Blue Crush 2, a sequel to the 2002 Drama/Romance film Blue Crush which starred Kate Bosworth and Michelle Rodriguez. Vinson portrayed the role of the film's villain Tara, an internationally successful pro-surfer. The film was released in June 2011. In October 2010 Vinson returned to Australia to begin production on Vinson's first role in an Australian film in the Paramount Pictures horror film Bait 3D as Tina, the protagonist's ex-girlfriend. The film follows a group of people trapped inside a flooded supermarket, following a freak tsunami, with a 12-foot great white shark. Vinson was reunited with former Home and Away cast member Lincoln Lewis. The film was shot in Brisbane on a $20 million budget. The film which was released in September 2012, was released to mixed reviews and failed to make an impact on the domestic box office. However, it was successful in China, Italy and Thailand, and earned $29 million worldwide.

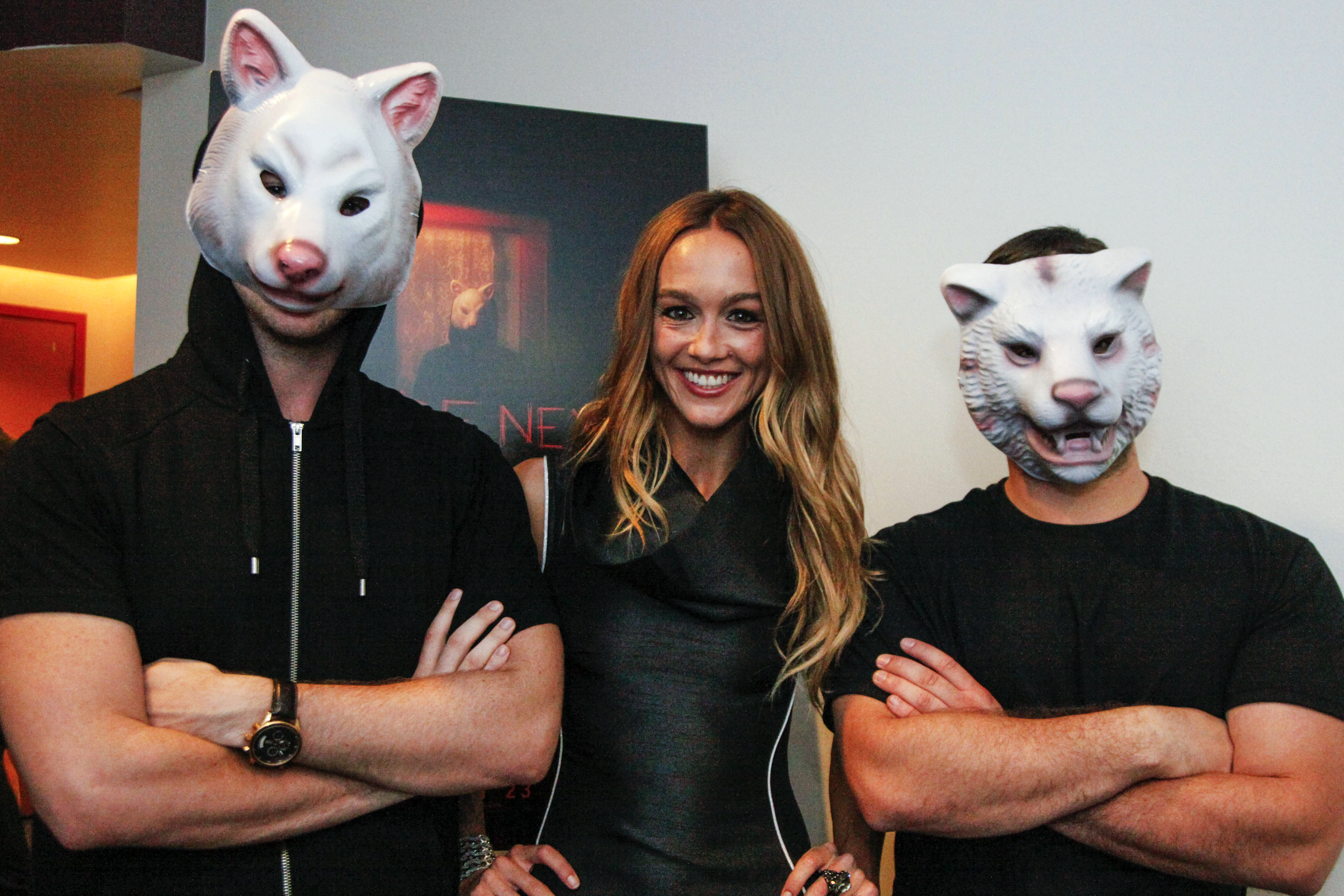
Sharni Vinson (centre) with "guardians" at a 2013 showing of You're Next in Miami

Following Bait 3D, Vinson was cast in another horror film project that became her most critically acclaimed role to date. You're Next centres on a family reunion that goes terribly wrong when a group of mysterious masked killers start killing them off one by one. Vinson played the film's protagonist, Erin, the girlfriend of one of the family's sons. She was able to portray Erin with her natural Australian accent. Initially an independent film, its premiere at the 2011 Toronto International Film Festival secured it a distribution deal with Lionsgate. It was released in North America almost two years later, in August 2013. It received mostly positive reviews, with special regards for Vinson's performance; Total Film rated her character #1 on its list of '50 Most Bad-Ass Female Horror Leads'.

In March 2014 Vinson appeared in the Australian independent horror film Patrick, a remake of the 1978 film of the same name. Vinson portrayed nurse Kathy Jacquar, whose comatose patient Patrick uses his psychic powers to stalk her. It premiered in July 2013 at the Melbourne International Film Festival and received a limited Australian theatrical release in March 2014. It is Vinson's most critically acclaimed film to date, receiving 83% on Rotten Tomatoes based on 18 reviews. In 2015, Vinson appeared alongside John Cusack and Jackie Chan in Dragon Blade.

== Personal life ==
As of January 2019, Vinson holds dual citizenship for Australia and the United States.

== Filmography ==
=== Film ===
Year	Title	Role	Notes
2010	Step Up 3D	Natalie	
2011	Blue Crush 2	Tara	Direct-to-video
2011	You're Next	Erin	
2012	Bait 3D	Tina	
2013	Patrick	Kathy Jacquard	
2015	Dragon Blade	Lady Crassus	
2016	House on Willow Street	Hazel	Direct-to-video

=== Television ===
Year	Title	Role	Notes
2001	Home and Away	Tanya	Guest role
2003	Home and Away	Summer	Guest role
2005–2008	Home and Away	Cassie Turner	Main role
2008	CSI: NY	Lori Mandel	Episode: "Hostage"
2008	My Boys	Caitlin	Episode: "Spit Take"
2009	NCIS	Jeannette	Episode: "Broken Bird"
2010	Cold Case	Mia Romanov	Episode: "Metamorphosis"
2018	Captain Fitastic	Sugar-Shock	Episode: "The Sugar-Cane Mutiny"
2022	The Guardians of Justice	Speed	
2023	Australian Survivor: Heroes V Villains	Herself	8 episodes; 17th place
