= Jason Smith (actor) =

Australian actor and singer (born 1984)

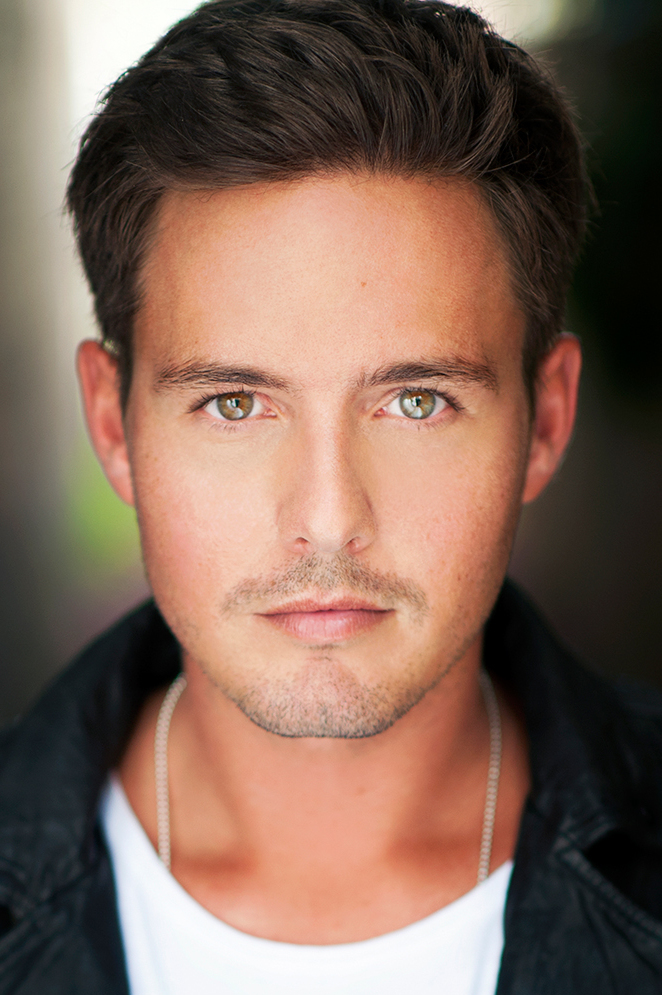
- Born: 31 May 1984 (age 42); Sydney, New South Wales, Australia
- Occupations: Actor; singer; writer; radio presenter
- Years active: 1996–present

Jason Smith (born 31 May 1984) is an Australian actor, writer and singer best known for his roles in Home and Away (2003–2006) and Power Rangers Jungle Fury (2008).

== Early life and education ==
Smith was born in Sydney and he studied at the Australian Theatre for Young People. When he was thirteen, Smith landed a role on Water Rats. After he completed high school, Smith chose to pursue a career in acting.

== Career ==
Smith's early credits include medical drama All Saints, children's series Ocean Star and the 2004 American biographical telemovie The Mystery of Natalie Wood.

He notably appeared as Robbie Hunter on the Australian soap opera Home and Away from 2003 until 2006, starring in storylines alongside Chris Hemsworth and Isabel Lucas. Smith earned a nomination for Most Popular New Male Talent at the 2005 Logie Awards for his role as Robbie.

Smith played Casey Rhodes, the Red Ranger, in Power Rangers Jungle Fury. He then starred as Gryff in Legend of the Seeker. Smith presented the first season of the Australian children's educational show Backyard Science. He also starred as a pied piper in a commercial for Axe. Smith appeared on the Australian game shows Talkin' 'Bout Your Generation and the Australian version of Pyramid.

In 2008, Smith released three songs; "What Planet", "Celebrity" and "Where".

In 2012, Smith wrote an episode of the soap opera Home and Away, which he had previously starred in.

In 2014, Smith reprised his role as Casey Rhodes on an episode of Power Rangers Super Megaforce titled "Spirit of the Tiger" and he also wrote the episodes "Blue Saber Saga", "Samurai Surprise", "Power of Six" and "All Hail Prince Vekar" of the same show.

In January 2016, Smith joined Nova FM to host Late Nights across the network. He resigned from Nova FM in December 2016 to focus on his acting career.

In 2019, Smith hosted the behind-the-scenes specials, Home and Away: Christmas in Summer Bay, which featured cast interviews and clips from the series. It was commissioned exclusively for Channel 5's streaming service My5 in the UK, but did also stream in Australia on 7plus.

== Filmography ==
=== Film ===
Year	Title	Role	Notes
2010	10 Days to Die	Zac Freeman	

=== Television ===
Year	Title	Role	Notes
1996–2000	Water Rats	Neil Wilson	3 episodes
2001	All Saints	Cameron Moyes / Troy Novak	2 episodes
2003	Ocean Star	Dylan Steadman	12 episodes
2003–2006	Home and Away	Robbie Hunter	112 episodes
2004	The Mystery of Natalie Wood	Jimmy Williams	Television film
2008	Power Rangers Jungle Fury	Casey Rhodes / Red Tiger Ranger	32 episodes
2008	Legend of the Seeker	Gryff	Episode: "Identity"
2014	Power Rangers Megaforce	Casey Rhodes	Episode: "Spirit of the Tiger"
2017	The Letdown	Angus	Episode: "Trivial Pursuits"

== Awards and nominations ==
Year	Work	Award	Category	Result
2005	Home and Away	Logie Awards	Most Popular New Male Talent	Nominated
