= Joel McIlroy =

Australian actor (born 1973)

- Born: 8 August 1973 (age 53); Sydney, Australia
- Occupation: Actor
- Years active: 1996–present
- Notable work: Home and Away (2003–2006)

Joel McIlroy (born 8 August 1973 in Sydney) is an Australian actor, known for being the second actor to take on the role of Flynn Saunders, a character of the popular soap opera Home and Away. McIlroy took over the role of Flynn in 2003 after Martin Dingle-Wall left the role in 2002.

== Early life ==
Joel McIlroy grew up in the Northern Beaches area of Sydney. McIlroy first appeared in various productions with the Forest Youth Theatre Company, acting in musicals from the age of 16 to 18. After starring in a Year 11 musical production with his high school, McIlroy decided that he wanted to become an actor. While still at school McIlroy went to the USA and studied in Los Angeles for six months. He later travelled around Europe before returning to Sydney to study acting.

At 20, McIlroy enrolled in the Australian Theatre for Young People (ATYP) and after completing four years' study has had acting roles in theatre and television ever since. McIlroy appeared in the plays, A Midsummer Night's Dream, Henry V (both by Shakespeare) and The Hour We Knew Nothing of Each Other. He worked at student jobs to support himself during those years.

== Career ==
Many years later, he is still connected with the "Theatre for Young People." After appearing in the short film, The Beat Manifesto, for the Australian Film and Television School (North Ryde, Sydney), McIlroy was nominated for an AFI Award. He also won the Lend Lease Scholarship from the "Australian Theatre for Young People." McIlroy enrolled in a director's course with the National Institute of Dramatic Art (NIDA). His acting career spanned various plays and guest roles in television: Water Rats (1996), All Saints (1998), as Brent Duffy for four episodes of the ABC TV drama Love Is a Four-Letter Word (2001), also as Bertie Jenkins in the ABC mini series Changi (2001) and as Chook in the feature film, Angst (2000).

He also directed two Sam Shepherd plays, Action and Fool for Love.

McIlroy's acting career really took off when he joined Home and Away to replace Martin Dingle-Wall as 'Flynn Saunders'. In 2006 he was nominated for a Silver Logie Award for the most popular actor on Australian television. After becoming the husband of Sally Fletcher (Kate Ritchie), Flynn Saunders died of skin cancer, after stopping chemotherapy so he could die peacefully at home.

In 2007, he appeared in "Lion Pig Lion" at the Dunstan Playhouse in Adelaide with actress Carmel Johnson.

== Arrest ==
McIlroy is infamous for his violent outbursts and his multiple court appearances. On 6 July 2023, he was charged for damaging a passenger window frame by smashing it with a cricket bat. On 23 October 2019, McIlroy also appeared in court after allegedly assaulting a female police officer in an unprovoked attack. In a statement, NSW Police said the 29-year-old senior constable was left with injuries to her face, neck and shoulder after she was allegedly punched repeatedly by McIlroy. In 2024 he assaulted a security guard at Surry Hills Crown Hotel but was never charged in court.

== Filmography ==
Film
Year	Title	Role	Notes
1995	The Beat Manifesto	Hamish Mitchell	Short
2000	Angst	Chook	
2007	My Last Ten Hours with You	Jeremy	Short (Note: Also released as a segment for the 2011 film Boys on Film 6: Pacific Rim)
2018	The 5th Shadow	Henry Blank	

Television
Year	Title	Role	Notes
1994	Home and Away	Dangerous Driver	Season 7, Episode 80
1995	Police Rescue	Terry	Season 4, Episode 7
1998	Water Rats	Eddie Olejarnick	Season 3, Episode 18
1999	Heartbreak High	Brad	Season 7, Episode 9
2000	All Saints	Case Harpur	Season 3, Episode 15
2001	Love Is a Four Letter Word	Brent Duffy	Season 1, Episodes 15, 18, 20, 21 & 22
2001	Changi	Bertie Jenkins	Miniseries (6 episodes)
2002	All Saints	Frank Theros	Season 5, Episode 40
2003–06	Home and Away	Flynn Saunders	Seasons 16–19 (main cast, 78 episodes)
2003	Home and Away: Hearts Divided	Flynn Saunders	Video special
2012	Dance Academy	Motorcycle Instructor	Season 2, Episode 22
