= Gina Austin =

- Home and Away character
- Portrayed by: Sonia Todd
- Duration: 2009–2013
- First appearance: Episode 4776; 26 January 2009
- Last appearance: Episode 5725; 18 April 2013
- Introduced by: Cameron Welsh
In-universe information
- Occupation: Principal of Summer Bay High (2009–2013)
- Brothers: Tony Holden
- Husband: Jeremy Austin; John Palmer (2010–2013)
- Sons: Hugo Austin; Brendan Austin; Xavier Austin
- Stepdaughters: Shandi Ayres
- Nephews: Lucas Holden; Jack Holden; Harry Holden

Gina Palmer (also Holden and Austin) is a fictional character from the Australian soap opera Home and Away, played by Sonia Todd. The character debuted on-screen during the episode broadcast on 26 January 2009. Gina is the older sister of Tony Holden and the mother to three sons; Hugo, Brendan and Xavier Austin. The character was killed off on 18 April 2013, following Todd's decision to leave.

== Casting ==
Todd made several guest appearances as Gina in 2009. In September of that year, it was announced that she had joined the regular cast after impressing Seven's drama executives. Todd told Inside Soap that she was largely attracted to Home and Away as it films in Sydney, where she lives.

== Character development ==
Of Gina, the serial's official website said "Gina is a loving mother, and she knows she has made terrible mistakes with her eldest and youngest boys. But she did her very best [...] She's been worn down by the way her life unfolded, but blames no one and tries not to indulge in self-pity. It is what it is, and she just has to get by." Soap opera reporting website Holy Soap describe Gina as a "down-to-earth, warm woman who has spent her whole life looking after her family at the expense of her own needs and desires." Todd states the thing she likes most about Gina is the fact that she has three children that are all boys. In a 2011 interview, Todd explained that Gina had had a tough life and she was a bit downtrodden, but she had now grown nicely since her arrival.

While interviewed by TV Week, Todd said Gina is "a mum struggling to bring up three boys whom she loves very much." Her son Brendan (Kain O'Keeffe, suffers from learning difficulties. Todd said Brendan's disability is a "double-edge sword" because it puts a lot of "stress and pressure" on Gina, however, because of this the Austin's share a "close and lovely" bond. Todd revealed that Gina's husband Jeremy walked out on the family, which left Gina in a "fight or fight" situation which she manages to stay throughout.

In one storyline Gina's eldest son, Hugo (Bernard Curry) is put into witness protection. When he breaks his cover, Gina, Xavier (David Jones-Roberts) and Martha MacKenzie (Jodi Gordon) are kidnapped by Killer (Mirko Grillini) and entrapped in a water vat. Luke Jacobz who plays Angelo Rosetta told TV Week the reason Hugo was put into protection was to keep Gina "out of the way of his many enemies". Network Seven used the storyline to keep viewers guessing who would die, by confirming there would be a death and refusing to reveal their identity. However, Gina survives.

Gina and her husband, John (Shane Withington), began fostering Jett James (Will McDonald) in 2012. Todd noted that Jett came into Gina and John's lives at the right time, calling him "a much-needed light when their relationship was on the rocks." The actress thought that Gina and John had found common ground in their need to care for Jett and their marriage became more stable.

In April 2013, Todd departed Home and Away. She told TV Week's Carolyn Stewart that after four years on the show, she felt it was time to move on and pursue other acting challenges. Gina's final storyline saw her fall unconscious at the wheel of her car, during a family trip. Todd explained "Gina's eyesight starts to blur and she questions what she's seeing in front of her. It's a scary moment for John and Jett. They don't know what is happening and Gina also doesn't know what is happening to her own body. It all happens so quickly. One moment she is driving and the next she passes out and collapses in the car." Digital Spy's Sophie Dainty said the moment would be "a devastating blow to the family", who had just learned that Jett's adoption had been approved. Todd hoped John would find happiness after Gina's death.

== Storylines ==
Gina arrives in Summer Bay to attend the funeral of her nephew, Jack Holden (Paul O'Brien). Gina realises her brother Tony (Jon Sivewright) needs support, so she decides to stay in Summer Bay for a while. Gina forces Xavier to break up with Freya Duric (Sophie Hensser) so he can help take care of his brother Brendan, who suffers from learning difficulties. This causes friction between Gina and Xavier. She also tries to heal the rift between Xavier and her eldest son Hugo. Hugo walked out on his family after becoming tired of helping to care for Brendan. Gina decides Xavier should remain in Summer Bay to have time to himself and takes Brendan back home with her.

Gina returns to bring Brendan for a visit. Brendan seemed content to back with his family. When it is time to leave, Brendan refuses to. He pushes Gina over, breaking her ankle. Gina says she will be okay to look after Brendan by herself, but Hugo convinces her to let him stay while she recovers. When Gina returns again, she is upset and angry with Xavier to learn that Brendan has seriously injured Roman Harris (Conrad Coleby). When Hugo accidentally harms Brendan, Gina believes he did it on purpose. When they sort out their differences, she takes Brendan back to the city. She returns when it is Brendan's twenty first birthday, but a man named Ted, who she had been in a casual relationship with follows her. She goes on a holiday with him, but returns after Ted suggests she put Brendan in a home. Brendan forms a romantic relationship with a woman who has Down syndrome, Ruby Leeds (Tracie Sammmut) and wants to move into in community housing with her. Gina refuses because she thinks he is not ready for independence. Though, over time she realises he is and eventually gives him consent.

Gina starts to feel she has no purpose without Brendan. She decides to revive her teaching career and applies for a science teaching job at Summer Bay High. Though Martin Bartlett (Bob Baines) is so impressed with her that he makes her the acting principal. She is initially worried because of when she used to be a principal, she got to vocal with students. She then meets John Palmer, when he comes to give a speech about surfing to her students. Gina is aware that John had been feuding with her brother. However, agrees to go on a date with him. As they start to spend more time together, Xavier is disapproving of John. This causes tension in her household. Gina later manages to convince Xavier that she wants to enter a relationship with John, despite his initial fears he may hurt her. Hugo is later killed and his part in human trafficking is exposed. Gina is disgusted by the revelation and does not attend her son's funeral. She then tries to block every memory of Hugo out and refuses to talk about him. Gina then helps Romeo Smith (Luke Mitchell) return to school. She tries to help his sister Mink Carpenter (Matylda Buczko) turn her life around. John and Gina become distant from one another. She tries to set things back on track by attempting to end the feud between John and Tony. She gives Tony a job at the school, but his attempts to introduce boxing lessons annoy Gina. Gina starts dating John again, but Xavier refuses to stand by her this time. When Xavier threatens to move out, she agrees to see John away from their home. She gradually lets John visit the house, which causes more problems. Gina tries to keep out of Tony and John's feud over boxing. Gina finds out Hugo is actually alive and his death had been a cover up. Gina helps Hugo hide from the police.

When John kisses Jill Carpenter (Josephine Mitchell), Gina avoids him. Gina is then kidnapped along with Xavier and Martha and are entrapped in a water vat, they escape death when Xavier manages to escape. Gina goes to see John who is entertaining Jill, he forces Gina to leave, leaving her confused. Gina manages to see Hugo one last time before he goes on the run with Martha. Gina is shocked when John tells Gina that he is seeing Jill because she is not as complicated as Gina. Romeo tries to help Gina win John back from his mother. John eventually decides to be with Gina. Gina asks him to move in but Xavier once again expresses his worries. She agrees to let April (Rhiannon Fish) and Bianca Scott (Lisa Gormley) move in for a while in return for Xavier being nice to John for two months. John later has a heart attack, this leaves Gina upset and she tells John she loves him. He then recovers and John proposes to Gina, but she turns him down because she assumes he is only asking because he is scared of dying. John decides to move out. She later realises she still wants John and they see each other in secret. John moves back in on the understanding they do not discuss marriage. Gina helps Roo Stewart (Georgie Parker) get money to Hugo and Martha. When Bianca runs away from her own wedding, Gina and John decide to get married in her place.

Gina is sacks Liam Murphy (Axle Whitehead) after he starts using drugs. Gina's old friend Vanessa Unley (Sarah Chadwick) arrives in town and she and Gina reminisce over old times when they were biker chicks. Vanessa accuses Gina of becoming boring and convinces her to go to a festival. The festival is cancelled and Gina and Vanessa go camping instead. John mistakenly thinks Gina is showing signs of menopause and invites Colleen Smart (Lyn Collingwood) to talk to her. John invites Gina to a tourism convention in Hawaii, but she turns the offer down when she learns Xavier is in hospital after nearly drowning. Gina allows Kelly O'Mara (Martika Sullivan) to stay with the family on the provision nothing happens between her and Xavier. However, Kelly and Xavier begin dating and tell Gina, who allows Kelly to stay because she is a good influence on her son. Gina is upset when Xavier leaves town to be with Kelly. She struggles with his decision to give up his HSC, but is relieved when he returns home. Gina expels Casey Braxton (Lincoln Younes) when she learns he bought a knife into school. During a large storm, the school roof falls in and the department of education decide to close the site. Gina is asked to hand over the school records, which makes her suspicious. She and some helpers look through the files to try and understand why the board want the school demolished. They learn repairs were not carried out to the roof following an earthquake and use it to blackmail the board into keeping the school open

When Jett James begins attended the high school and bullies VJ Patterson (Felix Dean), Gina takes an interest in him and begins to looking out for him. Gina helps Jett through his mother's death and father's reappearance. Xavier leaves to attend the police academy and Gina and John invite Jett to stay with them. Gina suspects John is having an affair with Marilyn, but they eventually resolve their relationship issues. Gina and John tell Jett that they want to adopt him and he is initially against the idea, but he later comes around to it. However, on the drive to the court to finalize the adoption, Gina begins suffering from a headache and hallucinations of herself. Gina suddenly stops the car, falls unconscious and dies from an aneurysm.

== Reception ==
Holy Soap said Gina's most memorable moment was "Getting the job of principal at Summer Bay High." Gina came third in an Inside Soap poll to find out which soap character readers would most like to have as their headteacher. She received 17% of the vote. Michael Idato of The Sydney Morning Herald said that as Gina, Todd was one of the serial's leads who puts in a "robust performance" and credited it as being part of Home and Away's success. Claire Crick from All About Soap said that Gina's death made an unmissable and "heart-wrenching episode that will leave you sobbing". She added that she was heartbroken about the decision to kill her off and described the aftermath as more upsetting. Inside Soap staff said that Gina's death was one of the best soap opera storylines that aired in the United Kingdom during May 2013.
