= List of Home and Away characters introduced in 2009 =

Home and Away is an Australian television soap opera. It was first broadcast on the Seven Network on 17 January 1988. The following is a list of characters who first appeared in 2009, they are listed in order of their first appearance. They were all introduced by the show's executive producer, Cameron Welsh. The 22nd season of Home and Away began airing from 19 January 2009 and concluded on 27 November 2009. The first introductions of the year were Gina and Hugo Austin who arrived in January. February saw the debuts of Robert Cruze, Trey Palmer, Freya Duric and Joey Collins. Liam Murphy and John Palmer arrived in March, while Lachie Cladwell and David Gardiner debuted in April. May Stone arrived in June. July saw the birth of Harry Holden and the arrival of the Walker Family consisting of Sid, Dexter and Indigo. Detective Robert Robertson arrived in August and in September Romeo Smith was the final character to be introduced.

== Gina Austin ==
Gina Austin, played by Sonia Todd, made her first on-screen appearance on 27 January 2009 and departed on 18 April 2013. The serial's official website describe her stating: "Gina is a loving mother, and she knows she has made terrible mistakes with her eldest and youngest boys. But she did her very best [...] She's been worn down by the way her life unfolded, but blames no one and tries not to indulge in self-pity. It is what it is, and she just has to get by." Soap opera reporting website Holy Soap describe Gina stating: "A down-to-earth, warm woman who has spent her whole life looking after her family at the expense of her own needs and desires." Todd states the thing she likes most about Gina is the fact that she has three children that are all boys.

== Hugo Austin ==
Hugo Austin
- Home and Away character
- Portrayed by: Bernard Curry
- First appearance: 27 January 2009
- Last appearance: 9 June 2010
- Introduced by: Cameron Welsh
In-universe information
- Occupation: Diving instructor
- Father: Jeremy Austin
- Mother: Gina Austin
- Brothers: Brendan Austin; Xavier Austin
- Wife: Suzy Sudiro (separated)
- Uncles: Tony Holden
- First cousins: Jack Holden; Lucas Holden; Harry Holden

Hugo Austin, played by Bernard Curry, made his first appearance on 27 January 2009, departed on 26 January 2010, returned on 6 May 2010 and departed once again on 9 June 2010. Curry previously acted in rival Australian soap opera Neighbours. On working in Home and Away, Curry said "I can honestly tell you I have never enjoyed working on a show as much as I have on Home & Away. The character's great, I'm really enjoying the challenge". Hugo is described as the "outdoorsy type with the physique and tan to prove it".

== Robert Cruze ==
Robert Cruze
- Home and Away character
- Portrayed by: Aidan Gillett
- First appearance: 1 February 2009
- Last appearance: 31 March 2009
- Introduced by: Cameron Welsh

Robert "Robbo" Cruze, played by Aidan Gillett, made his first on-screen appearance on 1 February 2009.

Robbo works on the boat with Aden Jefferies and Joey Collins where he enjoys winding them up. He continues his campaign against Joey mainly who he takes issue with because of her sexuality. One day he pushes Joey overboard into the water leaving her terrified of him, she tries to avoid him but Robbo continues to harass her. He tricks Aden into leaving him along with Joey and then sexually assaults her. He threatens her to keep quiet about the incident and she initially agrees out of fear. Joey later tells Aden what Robbo has done to her. After those around her convince her to report him she files a complaint. He denies it, his Ex-girlfriend, Tanya Gannon turns up to help with the case but she is run over. Angry that Joey has filed a complaint he tracks Joey down and attacks her, he also tries drown Joey in a bath tub but Charlie arrives saves her and arrests Robbo. He is charged and not seen again.

== Trey Palmer ==
Trey Palmer
- Home and Away character
- Portrayed by: Luke Bracey
- First appearance: 9 February 2009
- Last appearance: 31 July 2009
- Introduced by: Cameron Welsh
In-universe information
- Occupation: Student
- Mother: Jenena Palmer
- Stepfather: John Palmer
- Sisters: Shandi Ayres (step)

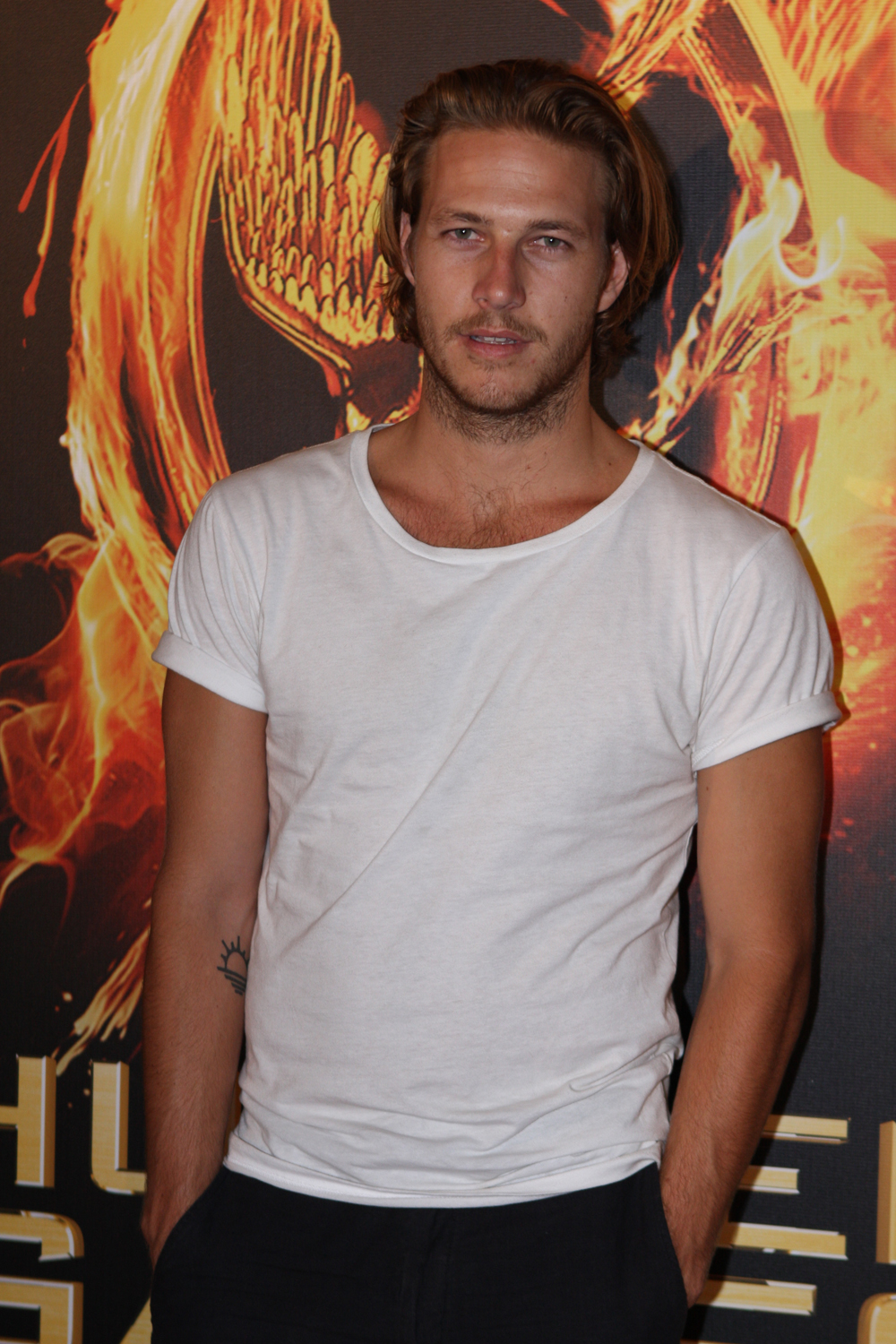
Luke Bracey played Trey Palmer

Trey Palmer, played by Luke Bracey, made his first on-screen appearance on 9 February 2009. Trey is described as having "the face of an angel" but engages in "devilish behaviour". His arrival on-screen is said to have "stirred viewers up". Upon his arrival Trey enjoys causing trouble for Geoff Campbell (Lincoln Lewis) and Nicole Franklin. A notable storyline for the character is the filming of a sex tape. The plot was branded "bizarre" after it mirrored a real life scandal that had occurred weeks earlier. After Lincoln Lewis, who plays Trey's on-screen enemy Geoff, had been caught up in a sex tape scandal which leaked onto the internet, the serial decided to include Trey making a sex tape with Nicole and having it leaked. Joe Brett from Holy Soap likened the character to a "neurotic wolverine".

Trey is first seen in Summer Bay at the school. He takes pleasure in bullying many of the locals, including Jai Fernandez (Jordan Rodrigues), who he makes racist taunts towards, and causing trouble for the teachers. His attitude problem continues to get him into many bad situations. He takes a dislike to Geoff Campbell and they feud for a long period of time. Trey repeatedly claims to have a tough home life and states he does not get on with his stepfather John and their antagonism shows when John appears on-screen. Trey also develops a grudge against Miles Copeland, but begins to make progress with Kirsty's help – he develops an attraction to her. He makes advances towards her which she rejects. In doing so, Kirsty and Miles get back together. Feeling hurt, he tries to attack Kirsty, Miles attempts to save her but Trey is hurt in the process. He presses charges against Miles who is suspended from teaching, however later Trey drops the charges.

Trey later appears to be bettering himself, he starts to grow closer to Nicole. The pair eventually admit their attraction to one another. They decide to date for a while, until they eventually have sex. The pair decide to make a sex tape and Trey leaks it in revenge, which leaves Nicole humiliated. Trey's anger becomes too much when he holds up the school bus whilst on a field trip. He then reveals he has planted a bomb underneath. After desperate pleas from everyone, many students escape unharmed. However, the bomb explodes and Hugo Austin is seriously injured in the attack. Trey is subsequently arrested for attempted murder.

== Freya Duric ==
Freya Duric
- Home and Away character
- Portrayed by: Sophie Hensser
- First appearance: 10 February 2009
- Last appearance: 24 February 2009
- Introduced by: Cameron Welsh

Freya Duric, played by Sophie Hensser, made her first on-screen appearance on 10 February 2009.

In 2009, the serial embarked on two lesbian storylines, one of which involved Nicole Franklin (Tessa James). It featured Freya kissing Nicole, which sparked complaints. James described their dynamic, stating: "Freya's exactly what Nicole was like when she first arrived in the bay, that is why they click. Nicole relates to the wild side of Freya, but has no idea how far Freya is going to take it." James said Nicole was "angry" because she was on Freya's "not hot list". Freya kisses her to prove she thinks she is hot, James opined that Nicole did not enjoy the kiss, but was just "happy to be center of attention" and happy that people were talking about her again. Freya's actions bring Nicole realisation that she has become boring.

Freya arrives looking for Xavier Austin, with whom she used to have a relationship. She appears brash and makes it clear to him that she wants to salvage their romance. He initially tries to resist her. Freya is annoyed to discover the reason behind this is because he was dating Ruby Buckton. Freya attempts to seduce him repeatedly and succeeds. Gina makes her dislike of Freya known to Xavier and warns him off her. They continue to see each other and she stirs up trouble with locals. Freya then decides to push drugs in the Bay. She convinces Xavier to sell some drugs at Summer Bay High. After a disagreement with Nicole, she accuses her of being boring. To prove that she is not she kisses her in view of many students. This annoys Geoff who accuses her of scheming. Freya enjoys manipulating Xavier into doing her many favours. However she grows bored and later kisses Xavier's brother Hugo. She is unaware that Xavier witnesses this. She tries to blame Hugo, but he breaks up with her. Freya realises there is nothing to stay for and quickly leaves the area.

== Joey Collins ==
Joey Collins
- Home and Away character
- Portrayed by: Kate Bell
- First appearance: 12 February 2009
- Last appearance: 28 April 2009
- Introduced by: Cameron Welsh
In-universe information
- Brothers: Brett Collins

Joey Collins, played by Kate Bell, she made her first on-screen appearance on 12 February 2009.

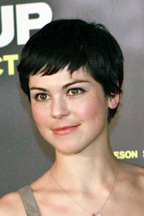
Kate Bell played Joey Collins.

Home and Away producers introduced a storyline that saw fellow character Charlie Buckton (Esther Anderson) begin a relationship with Joey. Producers hoped the plot would boost the shows ratings. Over five weeks the storyline would see the pair realise that their friendship is beginning to develop into something else. As they fall for each other, Charlie and Joey share intimate kissing and dance scenes. Of a possible return for the character executive producer Welsh stated: "We always keep the door open for characters like that. She was a really popular character and Kate (Bell) did a fantastic job portraying her, so we would always keep the door open."

Joey is first seen working on the boat with Aden Jefferies and Robbo Cruze. Robbo starts giving Joey a hard time each day she attends work. One day Robbo pushes Joey over board the boat, this terrifies her and she does not want to work with him. She later reveals to Aden she is a lesbian. She starts falling for Charlie after they become friends. Her brother Brett is extremely annoyed to hear about her sexuality and argues with her and announces his disapproval. He even throws her out so she goes to stay with Charlie.

Robbo becomes more annoyed at Joey's presence at work and continues to harass her. He manages to get Aden to leave him alone with Joey, he tries it on with Joey and sexually assaults her. He threatens her not to go to the police. She tells Aden about it, he and Belle Taylor try to convince her to file a complaint against him. When she does he denies it, Brett does not believe her either. Charlie manages to get Robbo's ex Tanya to file a complaint but when she arrives in town she is hit by a car and the driver flees the scene. Robbo finds Joey and attempts to drown her, only to be saved by Charlie. Robbo is arrested and charged. At this point Charlie kisses Joey.

They start a secret relationship up, but are later found out. Homophobic comments are left on Charlie's car and the whole town are gossiping about the pair. As their relationship continues Charlie seems too wrapped up in work all the time to notice Joey is still having a hard time. Charlie is still having trouble to come to terms with her sexuality. Joey later says a tearful goodbye to Charlie and leaves for another job.

== Liam Murphy ==
Liam Murphy, played by Axle Whitehead, made his first on-screen appearance on 5 March 2009. Musician and presenter Whitehead successfully auditioned for the role. Liam was only intended to be in fifteen episodes. Whitehead has described Liam as a "bad boy rocker". Whitehead draws inspiration from his past experiences with old friends to portray Liam's drug taking.

== Brendan Austin ==
Brendan Austin
- Home and Away character
- Portrayed by: Kain O'Keeffe
- Duration: 2009–2010
- First appearance: 25 March 2009
- Last appearance: 29 January 2010
- Introduced by: Cameron Welsh
In-universe information
- Father: Jeremy Austin
- Mother: Gina Austin
- Stepfather: John Palmer
- Brothers: Hugo Austin; Xavier Austin
- Uncles: Tony Holden
- First cousins: Jack Holden; Lucas Holden; Harry Holden

Brendan Austin, played by Kain O'Keeffe, made his first appearance on 25 March 2009. O'Keefe was cast in the role after appearing in a film with cast members of the serial. The Austin family were introduced without Brendan, but the serial revealed that he would debut on-screen after them. They also revealed he suffers a mental disability, which causes friction between his brothers Xavier Austin (David Jones-Roberts) and Hugo Austin (Bernard Curry).

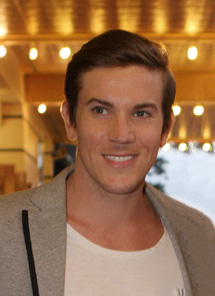
Kain O'Keeffe played Brendan Austin

Brendan arrives in Summer Bay with his mother Gina Austin (Sonia Todd), but when she fractures her ankle, they have to stay with his family indefinitely. Brendan has autism and his younger brother Xavier had been looking after him previously, in their older brother Hugo's absence. Brendan dislikes Hugo for this, Xavier too resents him for putting the pressure on him. Xavier tries to hide the fact that he has a brother with learning difficulties, on one occasion he hides him away from his friends. When his girlfriend Ruby Buckton (Rebecca Breeds) realises this, she spends time with Brendan. She convinces him not to be ashamed and Brendan starts to get to know more people. He is later put in Martha MacKenzie's (Jodi Gordon) care, but he runs away, claiming he wants to be with Xavier. He climbs a tree and becomes trapped, but is soon rescued.

Brendan runs away again while in Martha's care. He becomes startled by the colour of Roman Harris's (Conrad Coleby) car and uses his catapult to launch a brick through the window, which hits Roman in the head, causing him to crash the vehicle. Leah Patterson-Baker (Ada Nicodemou) is also in the car at the time. Xavier witnesses this and convinces Brendan to leave the scene, before taking the blame for the accident. Roman remains in a coma for a short time, and when he awakes he is blind. It is later revealed Brendan caused the accident and Roman decides against pressing charges, as he realises Brendan cannot be held accountable for his actions. It soon emerges that Brendan's aversion to blue cars is because he witnessed a blue car crash into Hugo's car when they were younger, leaving Hugo injured and his girlfriend dead.

Brendan later claims to have a girlfriend Ruby Leeds (Tracie Sammmut), who has Down syndrome. However, as she is named Ruby everyone initially assumes he is referring to Ruby Buckton. He later brings her to visit his family. Gina is happy to see her son coping alone, however, she is not convinced it will last. He asks if he can move to sheltered housing with Ruby and attend a learning facility. Gina decides against this, but Ruby eventually wins her over. When Xavier is knocked out and falls in the water, despite not being a good swimmer Brendan goes into the water and saves Xavier, which shocks and surprises Hugo and Gina. Gina lets Brendan leave to be with Ruby. He later returns to what he thinks is Hugo's funeral, but Hugo later turns out to be alive. When Gina dies a few years later, Xavier mention to their stepfather, John Palmer (Shane Withington) that Brendan is not coming to the funeral, since he is too upset.

== John Palmer ==
John Palmer, played by Shane Withington, arrives as Trey Palmer's step father. He made his first on-screen appearance on 27 March 2009. Former A Country Practice actor, Withington joined the cast of Home and Away in 2009 in the recurring guest role of John. The character was said to be a "strict father to his stepson" and a member of the surf lifesaving club.

== Claudia Hammond ==
Claudia Hammond
- Home and Away character
- Portrayed by: Alexandra Park
- First appearance: 10 April 2009
- Last appearance: 9 July 2009
- Introduced by: Cameron Welsh
In-universe information
- First cousins: Dubbo

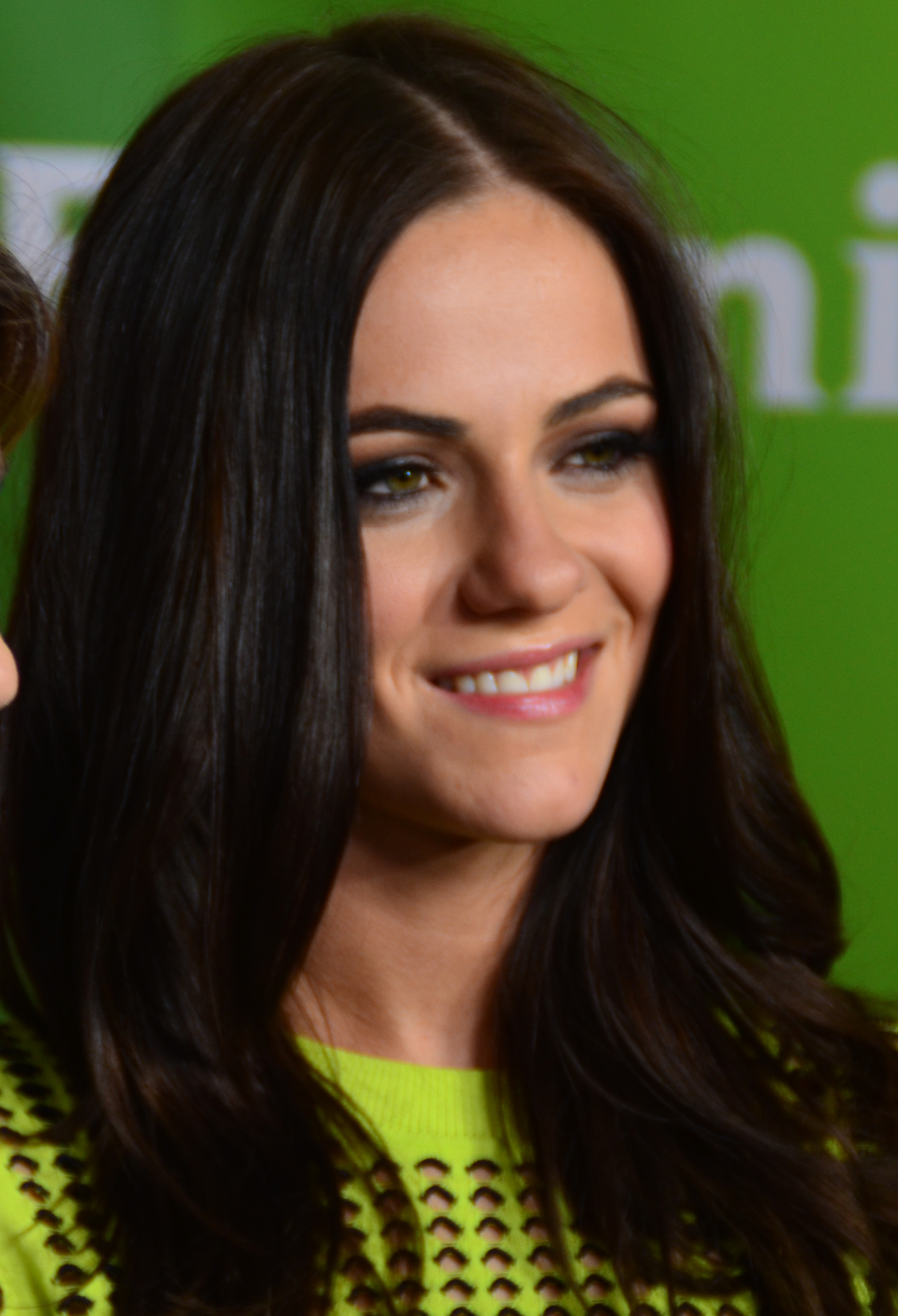
Alexandra Park played Claudia Hammond.

Claudia Hammond, played by Alexandra Park, made her first appearance on 10 April 2009. She starts a relationship with Geoff Campbell and announces she is pregnant. In one of her storylines, she sleeps with Geoff for the first time, and the caravan they are in sets on fire. Lincoln Lewis, who plays Geoff, has said that his religious character believed they were being punished and going to hell for sleeping together. Cameron Welsh said her relationship with Geoff was not as "clear cut" on the surface as it would seem, regarding her pregnancy. He stated that there would be a lot of mileage from the storyline and a lot going on during the last few weeks of Claudia's duration. Welsh's comments were in reference to Claudia lying about the identity of the father. When Lachie is injured by Geoff, the Daily Record she appeared to feel guilty about what she had done. Lewis has said he thought their Claudia was good for Geoff because it helped him explore new things and have a chance to grow up.

Claudia arrives to work on the farm with Geoff. She starts to develop feelings for him – they begin to date. They later sleep together and are subsequently trapped together in a fire inside their caravan. Lachie turns up and lashes out Geoff, blaming him. She later reveals she is pregnant, but promises Geoff her ex Lachie is not the father as their relationship ceased to be sexual before she left him. Lachie tries to win her back, but she rejects his advances.

Claudia watches on as the feud between Geoff and Lachie advances – whilst they are playing football, Geoff becomes angry and delivers a harsh tackle to Lachie. He is then thought to be paralyzed from the waist down. Feeling sorry for him Claudia reveals that he is in fact the father. Geoff throws her out of his home in anger. Lachie is delighted and presumes she is going to give him another chance. However he has another violent out burst and hurts Claudia, she tells him they cannot be a family and he is not allowed access to their child. She leaves the area without either man to live with her cousin Dubbo.

== Lachie Cladwell ==
Lachie Cladwell
- Home and Away character
- Portrayed by: Jackson Heywood
- First appearance: 4 May 2009
- Last appearance: 7 September 2009
- Introduced by: Cameron Welsh

Lachie Cladwell, played by Jackson Heywood, first appeared on-screen on 4 May 2009. Lachie is Claudia Hammond's (Alexandra Park) ex-boyfriend. They broke up a number of times in a six-month period. Claudia who falls for Geoff Campbell (Lincoln Lewis), is shocked when Lachie arrives to try and win her back. He later promises to leave Claudia be. Claudia announces she is pregnant and that Lachie is not the father, claiming that they had not been sleeping together before their last break up. Geoff becomes annoyed at Lachie and they clash during a rugby match. Lachie is hospitalised and is told he could be paralysed. Claudia is worried about him and reveals that he is in fact the father and not Geoff. Geoff throws Claudia out, at the hospital Lachie's anger gets the better of him and he launches into a temper against her. Lachie starts to think he and Claudia can be a family together and is delighted to learn he is making a full recovery. Claudia tells him she does not want him to be a part of her child's life and leaves Summer Bay for good.

The Daily Record said that Geoff did not have a bad bone in his body, but after much bad luck he let all of his anger out with Lachie on the receiving end.

== David Gardiner ==
David Gardiner
- Home and Away character
- Portrayed by: Jeremy Sims
- First appearance: 13 May 2009
- Last appearance: 10 June 2009
- Introduced by: Cameron Welsh

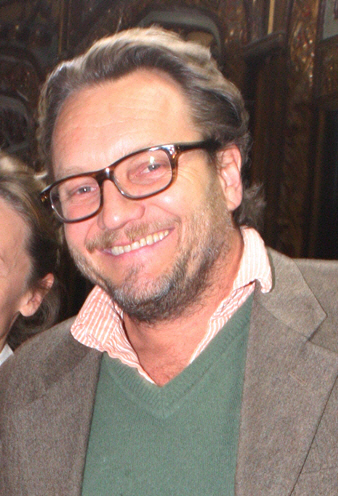
Jeremy Sims played David Gardiner

David "Gardy" Gardiner, played by Jeremy Sims, first appeared on-screen on 13 May 2009. The Sydney Morning Herald praised Sims performance as Gardy as convincing, and opined that his toying with Roman Harris (Conrad Coleby) was "genuinely creepy". A Daily Record reporter commented "He might have a cheeky smile and lovely hair but it would be fair to say Gardy is a baddie."

Gardy sneaks into the home of his military buddy, Roman and frightens Roman's daughter, Nicole Franklin (Tessa James) and her friend Ruby Buckton (Rebecca Breeds) when they return home from the beach. Roman, who has recently been blinded, identifies Gardy's voice and he agrees to let him stay. Within Gardy's first week in the bay, he, Roman and Hugo Austin (Bernard Curry) are involved in a huge brawl with John Palmer (Shane Withington) and several of his friends. Gardy then tries to shock Roman in order to cure his blindness by having him do a parachute jump off a bridge into water.

When this fails, Roman asks Gardy to leave but he talks him round with a bottle of scotch as a peace offering. Gardy later tries to make a move on Nicole, who is repulsed. After Roman regains his sight, Gardy coerces him into robbing a liquor store with him. The robbery is successful but an elderly woman suffers a heart attack and Roman's conscience gets the better of him and he performs CPR and manages to get away. After Nicole tells Roman about Gardy's advances, He is left in a dilemma as Gardy has threatened to frame him for the robbery. Gardy later decides to rob the Palmer house taking Trey (Luke Bracey) and Jenena (Anna Lise Phillips) hostage.

Roman tackles Gardy but lets him go and lies that he was there. It soon emerges that Gardy witnessed Roman shoot and kill one of his own men for disobeying an order when they were deployed to Afghanistan and has been blackmailing him for it. Gardy makes plans with a gang to rob a warehouse in Mangrove River but is forced to abort when the police arrive. He learns that Roman has tipped off the police and knocks him unconscious. When Roman stirs, Gardy threatens to shoot Nicole if he does not comply with the robbery. During the robbery, Gardy forces the workers into a store room where he plans to kill them for being witnesses. Roman declines the idea and finally stands up to Gardy threatening to shoot him and is shot in the process. Gardy pursues the wounded Roman and a shoot out begins. Xavier Austin (David Jones-Roberts) later turns up to the warehouse only to be taken at gunpoint by Gardy. After seeing the pair, Hugo demands that Gardy release Xavier but when his demands are ignored followed, Hugo fires aims a spear gun at Gardy but misses, Gardy then tries to shoot Hugo but Roman manages to subdue him by shooting him in the leg. When the police arrive, Gardy, albeit injured manages to escape into a creek never to be seen again.

== May Stone ==
May Stone
- Home and Away character
- Portrayed by: Alin Sumarwata
- First appearance: 12 June 2009
- Last appearance: 15 July 2009
- Introduced by: Cameron Welsh
In-universe information
- Occupation: Teacher

May Stone, played by Alin Sumarwata, made her first screen appearance on 12 June 2009. May arrives as a new teacher at Summer Bay high, she soon starts dating Angelo Rosetta. He starts seeing Charlie Buckton behind her back. Esther Anderson who plays Charlie described their actions stating: "She admits part of her wanted to cause trouble, but Angelo is still attracted to Charlie and they sleep together." The actress also defends Charlie's actions claiming she did not intentionally set out to hurt May. The Daily Record said it was Angelo who could have been more sensitive towards May and said she seemed distraught over their break up.

May begins her work at Summer Bay high. She immediately gets to know some of the locals and appears to settle into life quickly. She develops an instant attraction to Angelo, who is delighted at her interest. The two decide to start a relationship after some successful dates. Angelo's ex-girlfriend Charlie becomes jealous of May. Angelo reassures May he is over Charlie, however when he realises he still loves Charlie, the pair sleep together. He decides to try to keep it a secret. Later he and Charlie decide to May should know the truth after she starts becoming more serious with Angelo. He breaks up with May, but she demands to know if he was sleeping with Charlie. Upon finding out the truth May decides it would be better if she left the area. May hands in her notice at the school, but leaves straight away.

== Harry Holden ==
Harry Holden, played by a number of child actors, made his first appearance on 30 July 2009, the episode featuring his birth. Harry's parents are Rachel Armstrong (Amy Mathews) and Tony Holden (Jon Sivewright). He is Rachel's first child, but Tony's third. Rachel struggles in the wake of Harry's birth and becomes overwhelmed. A couple of weeks after his birth, Martha Mackenzie (Jodi Gordon) and Hugo Austin (Bernard Curry) offer to look after Harry to give Rachel and Tony a break. Gordon said the pair love looking after Harry, whom she described as "very well behaved." Harry is then kidnapped by Jane Avent (Felicity Price), a woman who blames her miscarriage on Rachel's negligence. A later storyline saw Harry accidentally suffocated by Rachel. In the lead up to the accident, Rachel is shown to be seriously sleep deprived as Harry is also not sleeping and she is distracted by a "rift" in her relationship with Tony. Rachel falls asleep and rolls on top of Harry, who stops breathing. Mathews said the scenes were "really hard to shoot" and "full-on". She explained that Rachel is woken by Tony, who cannot find Harry, and she realises that she went to sleep with him laid on her chest and she has rolled over. With Harry unconscious, Rachel goes into shock, but Tony snaps her out of it and she attempts resuscitation, before he is rushed to hospital. Mathews stated "Being the cause of any hurt to your own child is the worst-case scenario. It's just the most horrible situation."

After his birth, his mother Rachel finds it hard to cope. Harry does not stop crying and cannot get into a routine. She pushes everyone away to try and bond with him. When she cannot cope with his crying she contemplates smothering Harry. She decides to get help. After Jane Avent blames Rachel for the still birth of her baby she argues that Rachel should not have a child of her own. She steals Harry and a police search is conducted. Jane's husband Rex (Sandy Winton) is shocked to learn she has in fact kidnapped Harry after defending her. The police find Harry safe and well and return him to Rachel and Tony. Harry moves to Boston in the United States with his parents, briefly stopping at his half-brother Jack's (Paul O'Brien) grave to say goodbye as they leave.

== Sid Walker ==
Sid Walker, played by Robert Mammone, made his first on-screen appearance on 30 July 2009. Mammone was cast as Sid on a five-week guest contract. In June 2010, it was announced that Sid, Indigo and Dexter would be returning permanently after proving popular with viewers.

== Dexter Walker ==
Dexter Walker, played by Tom Green, made his first on-screen appearance on 30 July 2009. The following year Charles Cottier took over the role after Dexter was written back into the serial. Speaking of the handover from Green, Cottier stated: "I sometimes hang out with [him] – he's a really nice guy – but I chose not to watch what he'd done. I think Dex is quite a different character now, too." One of Dexter's first storylines was falling in love with Marilyn Chambers (Emily Symons). Cottier felt the plot was embarrassing to portray because of the age difference between the characters and he stated: "It was one of the first things I read about the character, and I was kind of embarrassed, but excited to do it! Not every guy comes to Summer Bay and falls in love with a woman 20 years older than him. My friends gave me grief about that!"

== Indigo Walker ==
Indigo Walker, played by Samara Weaving, made her first on-screen appearance on 30 July 2009. It was revealed in July that a new family would be introduced to Home and Away, the Walker family consisting of father Sid (Robert Mammone), mother Jody (Victoria Haralabidou), son Dexter (Tom Green) and daughter Indigo. In September 2009, the Walker family departed Home and Away at the end of their storyline. In June 2010, it was announced that Indigo and her family would return to the serial, of this Weaving stated: "It's a bit easier this time around as I don't have to fit in work and my studies on top of that."

== Robert Robertson ==
Robert Robertson
- Home and Away character
- Portrayed by: Socratis Otto
- Duration: 2009–2011
- First appearance: 16 September 2009
- Last appearance: 11 February 2011
- Created by: James Walker
- Introduced by: Cameron Welsh (2009)
In-universe information
- Occupation: Detective

Robert Robertson, played by Socratis Otto, made his first screen appearance on 2 August 2009. The character was created by James Walker as part of a murder storyline. Of the creation process Walker states that as the serial in not a "hard cop drama" they needed a character the lighten the mood. He also added: "Robertson, with all his quirks and unique sense of humour, allowed us to tackle some pretty dark material but keep it funny and energetic – not depressing, in other words. So to ensure that Robertson could bring as many of our characters into the investigation as possible, he needed to be a chameleon of sorts. His talent for lying and his need to trick truth out of people were key to this." Otto himself based Robert's persona on his own comedic talent and also drew inspiration from drama's that have eccentric investigators in them. Speaking of playing Robert Otto states: "It's one of the most fantastic roles I have ever come across." The Daily Record described Robert as "ruthless" compared to Charlie Buckton (Esther Anderson), and said Alf Stewart (Ray Meagher) had every right to worry.

Robertson is a police detective, who visits Summer Bay to investigate the murder of Grant Bledcoe, Ruby Buckton's (Rebecca Breeds) biological father. He begins to suspect Ruby's mother Charlie and arrests her. He later realises he may be wrong, however Charlie's father Ross (David Downer) admits responsibility for the crime. Robertson is something of an eccentric, with an off the wall way of looking at the world and a habit of telling tall stories, but is also a competent police officer. He has a few dates with Leah Patterson-Baker (Ada Nicodemou) and develops feelings for her. Leah decides against a relationship with him.

Robertson returns to investigate the disappearance of Penn Graham (Christian Clark). He works closely on the case with Detective Graves (Eryn Jean Norvill) and he chooses Alf as the prime suspect. He gathers evidence against him and attempts to force a confession out of him. After arresting Alf on a number of occasions, Robertson fails to find anything solid. He tries to romance Leah once more, making his feelings for her known. She tells him she cannot because she still has feelings for her ex-boyfriend Elijah Johnson (Jay Laga'aia). Robertson bullies Will Smith (Zac Drayson) into making a statement which implicates Alf at the scene of Penn's murder. He arrests Alf, but Morag Bellingham (Cornelia Frances) challenges the evidence Robertson and Will have given. Charlie refuses to work with him and threatens to take over the investigation. Morag later exposes Will as a liar and Robertson is forced to let Alf go and charge Will. Robertson is upset at the thought of himself looking incompetent. He confesses to Leah that he feels like he has lost his self-identity, she reassures him that it is human to make mistakes. Robertson asks Leah and her son to move to the city with him, as he has been offered a promotion, but Leah declines.

== Romeo Smith ==
Romeo Smith, played by Luke Mitchell, made his first on-screen appearance on 10 September 2009. Mitchell was given the part after he moved to Sydney with no work. Romeo is described as good looking and "cheeky, funny and gentlemanly". He was later given on-screen family in the form of sister, Mink Carpenter (Matylda Buczko) and mother Jill Carpenter (Josephine Mitchell), arrives in the Bay. Romeo's main relationship after Annie Campbell is with Indigo Walker (Samara Weaving).

== Others ==
| Date(s) | Character | Actor | Circumstances |
|---|---|---|---|
| 30 January | Bank manager | Christopher Saunders | A bank manager who realises Bridget Simmons is trying access Leah Patterson-Baker's funds illegally and informs Leah. |
| 30 January–6 October | Don Gibson | Steve Anderson | Gibbsy works on the boat with Aden. He engages in illegal abalone operations and Angelo arrests him. He tries to frame Aden for it. He refuses to give up the name of who he is working for, he tells Angelo everything he knows about Hugo. |
| 2–6 February | Steve Hogan | Damien Freeglass | Steve is a police constable investigating in Summer Bay for a few days. |
| 3 February | Lawyer | Blair Cutting | Angelo Rosetta's lawyer. |
| 4 February–25 January 2010 | Lou De Bono | David Roberts | Lou starts to date Irene Roberts. He is later killed at sea, Irene is arrested for his murder, but later found innocent. |
| 9–10 February | Archie Maddock | Tim Phillipps | Archie lives on the streets and finds a terrified Melody Jones and takes her under his wing. He defends her against thugs. Miles Copeland later finds him and he tells him of Melody's whereabouts. |
| 10 February | Thug | Zen Ledden | A thug who attacks Melody Jones and Archie Maddock. |
| 19 February | Mryll Ramsay | Kim Hillas | Mryll refuses to be interviewed by Belle Taylor to safe the old people's home she lives in. Melody talks her around. |
| 19–25 February | Audrey Long | Wendy Playfair | Audrey is grandmother to Melody Jones. Melody is shocked when she finds her in the home while she visits with reporter Belle Taylor. Audrey later dies from a stroke. |
| 3–19 March | George | Benjamin O'Donnell | George arrives at a speed dating night arranged by Colleen Smart. He gets on well with Leah until she realises she wants to be with Roman. |
| 9 March–29 July | Brett Collins | Toby Levins | Brett is Joey Collins' older brother. He has a hard time accepting Joey's sexuality and throws her out. After she is sexually assaulted he does not believe her, he later accepts her after she is nearly killed by Robbo and apologises. He later blames Charlie Buckton for ruining his family and the absence of Joey. |
| 16 March–26 January 2010 | Derrick Quaid | John Atkinson | Derrick watches Geoff Campbell and Nicole Franklin when they arrive on Jackson Island. He greets them and tells them he had been shipwrecked. He then attacks them after Geoff tries to call for help and smashes the radio. They eventually escape him and hide in the bush only to find Derrick has stolen their boat and Geoff's clothes. Derrick reappears when he is fighting Hugo Austin. Hugo's brother Xavier Austin tries to intervene but Derrick pushes him away causing him to hit his head. Ruby Buckton also is involved in the fray but Derrick overpowers her. It emerges that Derrick is responsible for illegal people smuggling Hugo and his wife, Suzy Sudiro are involved also involved. The three of them are eventually arrested. |
| 19 March–13 November | Jerry Thibault | Nicholas Cassim | Jerry hires Belle to work for the newspaper. She discovers that he is having an affair behind his wife Linda's back. When she finds out it is Paula, she agrees to keep it a secret. In return Jerry promises her the job of acting head, however he gives the job to Paula – which enrages Belle. |
| 19 March | Tanya Gannon | Hayley McCarthy | Tanya is Robert Cruze's ex who he attacked. She arrives in Summer Bay to file a complaint against him after being convinced by Charlie. When she arrives she is hit by a car and left for dead. |
| 20 March | Paula Gill | Paula Arundell | Paula works with Belle, she enjoys an affair with Jerry which sees her get a promotion. Paula discovers Belle has become addicted to pills, so she starts to bully her at work. |
| 23 March–23 November | Donna De Bono | Suzie MacKenzie | Donna is Lou's estranged wife. After Lou is found dead, she makes Irene look responsible and plies her with alcohol. |
| 23 April | Chelsea Murphy | Georgia Gorman | Chelsea is Liam Murphy's wife.She appears on the news when she is hounded by the press who follow her asking questions about Liam's drug abuse. She visits Liam in rehab and argues over a cosmestics deal she lost due to his excessive drug use. A photographer captures the argument and Liam lashes out by throwing a chair, making things worse between the couple. Chelsea and Liam later divorce and she relocates to Paris with their son Ash (Dusty Piper) |
| 23–28 April | Ash Murphy | Dusty Piper | Ash is Liam and Chelsea Murphy's toddler son. |
| 1–2 June | Jenena Palmer | Anna Lise Phillips | Trey's mother and John's wife. |
| 13 June–13 July | Clint Mailer | Matt Zeremes | Clint is the coach of the rugby team, he orders Aden to ruin Geoff Campbell's career or he will be dropped from the team. |
| 14 July–18 August | Jane Avent | Felicity Price | Jane first appears in hospital during a hectic day, she is put on a trolley in a corridor whilst giving birth. When she gives birth the doctors say her baby is still born. She blames Rachel Armstrong, believing her to be at fault. She starts harassing her whilst grieving and puts in a complaint. Rachel is suspended for a while and Jane is angry that Rachel has a child of her own. She kidnaps Rachel's son Harry and hides him in a cottage. A police hunt is undertaken and they find Harry safe, Jane admits she needs help. |
| 14 July–18 August | Rex Avent | Sandy Winton | Rex's baby dies in hospital. He believes Rachel to be at fault. He is shocked when his wife Jane steals her child. He defends her initially, but accepts she needs help. |
| 14 July–26 January 2010 | Wayan Rahardjo | Dorje Swallow | Wayan first appears in the hospital and cannot speak English. Everyone is suspicious of where he has come from and his close links to Hugo Austin. He runs away and on many occasions Angelo tries to use him to discover the truth about Hugo. |
| 20–21 July | Paul | Thomas Norrie | Paul appears in one episode briefly as an extra in the Bay. |
| 23 July–18 August | Squirt | Ben Davy-Thorburn | He works with Aden, they become friends. He attends Aden's stag night. |
| 29 July-27 November | Marine Officer Bryant | Michael Sutherland | A water police officer who works alongside Angelo Rosetta trying to uncover who is behind the people smuggling ring. |
| 30 July–17 August 2011 | Jody Walker | Victoria Haralabidou | Jody is Sid's wife. They agree to make another go of their relationship for the sake of Indigo and Dexter. However, after he cheats she leaves him for the final time. Jody returns in August 2011 to see Sid and the children. |
| 20 August | Michelle | Michelle Pettigrove | Michelle is Charlie Buckton's aunt. Ruby Buckton goes to her to find out information on Charlie's daughter she gave up for adoption. She tells her to ask Charlie, who reveals Ruby is in fact her daughter. |
| 24 August–8 July 2010 | Therese | Rose Ashton | Therese is a nurse at Northern Districts Hospital. She is seen sharing a coffee with colleague doctor Sid Walker much to the annoyance of Nicole Franklin. Sid insists he and Therese are just friends. Sid and Therese later sleep together and are caught by Nicole. When Theresa sees Sid with Marilyn Chambers she throws coffee on him. |
| 28 August–11 September | Andy McLeod | Paul Winchester | A man Rachel meets at the parent group, they get talking and he offers her advice on parenting. He and his daughter Sophia enjoy Rachel's company on a few occasions. Rachel's husband Tony becomes concerned that their friendship may develop into something else. Rachel diagnoses Sophia with a hearing problem and Andy gets to friendly in his thanks so Rachel distances herself from him realising Tony was right. |
| 28 August–11 September | Sophia McLeod | Madeline Andrews | Andy's daughter, she has problems with her attention span and Andy cannot figure out why. When Leah drops plates in the Diner Sophia doesn't flinch so Rachel diagnoses her with a hearing problem. |
| 1–16 September | Grant Bledcoe | Clayton Watson | Grant is Ruby's biological father. Charlie accuses him of rape when they were young. He protests his innocence – she tries to gather evidence against him so he could be convicted. Ruby is not sure whom to believe, as he now lives with his new wife Tracey and they prove to be a happy couple. Charlie kidnaps Grant to try to make him confess, however it does not work. He later reappears in the Bay but is found dead by Alf Stewart with stab wounds. Charlie is suspected for a long while, until her father Ross Buckton comes forward and says that he had arranged to meet him and told him to stay away from his family, then stabbed him in anger when he refused. |
| 8 September | Tracey Bledcoe | Mary Anne Byrne | Grant's wife who is shocked to learn of all the accusations made against him. |
| 15 September–1 March 2012 | Patrick Avery | Clayton Williams | Patrick is a Constable working in the background on various cases. He has continued to make episodic appearances into 2011. In 2012 Patrick bails Sid Walker (Robert Mammone) on an assault charge. |
| 18–22 September | Ruby Leeds | Tracie Sammmut | Ruby is Brendan's girlfriend who arrives in Summer Bay to spend time with him. She tries to convince Gina to see he capable of having some independence, they leave together to live in sheltered housing. |
| 18 September | Pheobe | Alisha Burton | Pheobe is a brief friend of Jai Fernandez. |
| 30 September | Jim | Mark Richardson | A hotel manager that appears in one episode. |
| 1 October–27 January 2010 | Bambang Rahardjo | Joft Prastowo | Bambang is Wayan's son. He starts to help Martha out on the farm, she becomes attached to him and cares for him. Angelo tries to use him as bait to catch the ring leader of the human trafficking. |
| 3 October–26 January 2010 | Suzy Sudiro | Tasneem Roc | Suzy Sudiro is Hugo Austin's ex-wife. It is revealed they were responsible for smuggling illegal immigrants from Indonesia. Suzy threatens to expose Hugo's involvement to Martha MacKenzie. Suzy then kidnaps Martha and transports her to Chinatown and demands the money Hugo owes her as ransom. Charlie Buckton arrives on the scene and disarms Suzy who produces a gun. Suzy falls overboard but Charlie is able to save her. |
| 6–17 November | Riley Radcliffe | Tani Edgecombe | Riley starts to bully VJ Patterson at school. Leah becomes concerned, so Miles visits his father Ian who refuses to listen. Riley and his friends attack Miles, who does not realise it was them. When he does he drags him to the police station – Miles is then arrested for breaking his wrist. However it is then revealed Ian caused Riley's injuries. |
| 6–17 November | Ian Radcliffe | Ben Simpson | Ian is first seen talking to Miles, he laughs off the suggestion his son Riley is bullying VJ. Miles suspects Ian is responsible for an assault carried out on him, he informs him it was his a group of minors including his son. After Miles attempted to drag Riley to the police station, Ian breaks Riley's wrist and blames Miles. He tells him he will drop the charges in exchange for money, the police uncover the truth and he is not seen again. |
| 9–24 November | Poppie Merrin | Elouise Blair | Poppie asks Liam to learn her how to play the guitar. He tries it on with Liam and he tells her no because he's with Nicole. Her sister Catie tells people that Liam has slept with Poppie, Aden tells Nicole. Nicole dumps Liam, Poppie goes around to Liam's with pills, he throws her out again but Liam is arrested for drug possession. |
| 17–24 November | Reg Merrin | Dane Carson | Reg is the manager of The Sands, he gives Aden a job there. He asks him to go to the formal with his daughter Catie, even though he's reluctant. He lets Aden keep his job even though Catie complains about his mistreatment of her at the formal. Catie makes it look like she and Aden have slept together in his car, Reg finds them and instantly fires Aden. |
| 18–24 November | Catie Merrin | Tess Haubrich | Catie convinces her dad Reg to ask Aden Jefferies out on a date for her, Aden does not like the idea because Catie has a reputation for stalking guys she likes. At the formal, Catie insults Nicole Franklin, annoying Aden who stays with Nicole. Catie accuses Nicole of stealing her date. A few days later, she hides in Aden's car, her father catches them and fires Aden. |
| 19–23 November | Orson Cardillo | Mark Lee | Orson is Donna DeBono's gardener and has worked for her for a number of years. Orson was forced to keep quiet when a mystery male planted the gun in Donna's house, which resulted in her being sent her to jail. He goes missing, later found in his car suffering a heart attack. The police demand the truth but no one finds out who the man was. |
| 20 November | Bonita Cardillo | Suzi Dougherty | Bonita is Orson's wife, she protests her husbands innocence to Irene and Donna when Orson is accused of planting the gun that killed Lou in Donna's home. |
| 25 November–18 February 2010 | Hazem Kassir | Ben Kermode | Hazem begins dating Leah Patterson-Baker. On Australia Day, Hazem is attacked and beaten by racist drunks who accuse him of being a terrorist. The drunks then cause a riot and set the diner alight. Hazem is rushed to hospital and is left paralyzed down one side of his body. He later ends his relationship with Leah and moves to the city. |
| 26 November | Prison Guard | Joe Tarena | A prison guard on duty when Derrick Quaid escapes from police custody. |
