= Aden Jefferies =

Fictional character in Home and Away

- Home and Away character
- Portrayed by: Todd Lasance
- Duration: 2005, 2007–2010
- First appearance: 4 August 2005
- Last appearance: 6 May 2010
- Introduced by: Julie McGauran
In-universe information
- Occupation: Student (2005–2008); Waiter (2008–2009); Deckhand (2009); Valet (2009)
- Father: Larry Jefferies
- Brothers: Sean Jefferies; Justin Jefferies
- Wife: Belle Taylor (2009)
- Grandfathers: Stan Jefferies
- First cousins: Simon Jefferies

Aden Jefferies is a fictional character from the Australian Channel Seven soap opera Home and Away, played by Todd Lasance. He debuted on-screen during the episode airing on 4 August 2005. Aden was introduced as a recurring character and as part of Cassie Turner's (Sharni Vinson) storylines. Lasance was offered the role after previously auditioning for a separate character. In 2007, Lasance was asked to return on another guest contract, though was promoted to the regular cast soon after.

Aden is characterised as a "bad boy" who goes on a journey to become one of the "good guys". Aden's backstory played a substantial role in his early material. His childhood was plagued with sexual abuse at the hands of his grandfather, while Aden's father, Larry Jefferies (Paul Gleeson) became an alcoholic. Lasance and scriptwriters have both pointed out that these events impacted on Aden's life and contribute to his destructive personality. As Aden begins to trust others again, he gains a close circle of friends including Nicole Franklin (Tessa James), Roman Harris (Conrad Coleby) and Morag Bellingham (Cornelia Frances). He also has a nemesis throughout his tenure in the form of Geoff Campbell (Lincoln Lewis). However, his main relationship is with Belle Taylor (Jessica Tovey); when the actors first heard that their on-screen counterparts would enter a relationship, they both complained to producers. Both felt like it would not work out and be ill-received by viewers. However, the two realised they had chemistry as a duo and took a chance. The couple became popular with viewers and fans coined the term "Adelle" to refer to the pair.

Other storylines include holding those closest to him as hostages and being admitted to a psychiatric ward. He is also forced to cope with Belle's death after their wedding and a subsequent relationship with his best friend Nicole. Certain media outlets enjoyed Aden and Belle's romance citing the moment they were torn apart as a "sad loss". Aden also gained recognition as being a popular "bad boy" from Inside Soap. For his portrayal of Aden, Lasance won the award for the "Most Popular Actor" at the 2009 Logie Awards.

== Casting ==
In 2005, Todd Lasance auditioned for the role of Jack Holden; however, actor Paul O'Brien secured the role. The serial's producers called Lasance back, offering him the part of Aden, which was a guest role lasting six weeks. Aden was brought into the serial to play a part of Cassie Turner's (Sharni Vinson) storylines. Lasance had not previously watched the serial, but upon learning of his part he said he watched it "religiously" and carried out research on the net. In April 2007, The Newcastle Herald announced that Lasance would return to filming with Home and Away. He was signed another guest contract. While filming the stint programme, bosses decided that Aden should become a regular character and Lasance signed a new contract. At the time there was a possibility of Lasance securing a role in the television series The Pacific. However, he chose to re-join Home and Away because did not want to take the risk of losing both roles.

In August 2009, TV Week reported that Lasance had quit Home and Away to pursue a career overseas when he signed with a Los Angeles talent agency. However, a spokesperson for the serial said there were no immediate plans for Lasance to be written out. His official departure was later made public and he filmed his final scenes on 15 January 2010. Lasance said he was glad Aden was not killed off because it was a "realisation of his potential". While he had no immediate plans to return, he also said he would like to return one day to "see what Aden's up to".

== Character development ==
=== Characterisation ===
"[As Aden] I've been in a car accident, I nearly killed my dad, I've been abused, my dad got held at gunpoint, my dad was an alcoholic and the diner collapsed on me so I've been in hospital three times. We're talking 12 months here so he's had a pretty rough trot. I think everyone in Summer Bay needs a bit of therapy."

— Lasance on Aden's storyline development. (2008)

When Lasance secured the role, he said "Aden causes a bit of mischief in the Bay but he's really a good guy." Aden has been described as a "good looking guy with a smile that melts every heart." Aden is initially portrayed as an "anti-social bully with a huge chip on his shoulder" where authority figures are concerned. Aden's mother died while he was young and he was raised by his father Larry Jefferies (Paul Gleeson). Aden is a keen football player, though Larry did not approve or support his ambitions. When Lasance returned to the serial in 2007, he described Aden as being "an absolute bad-arse". When he read the scripts, he thought Aden seemed like an idiot and that viewers would take a dislike to the character. He added that Aden is a strong character and he enjoyed making him "believable". Lasance said that he did not want Aden to turn into a "good guy". The good thing about Aden is the fact "he never quite shakes off the bad-boy image" despite his "different facets".

=== Abuse ===
One of Aden's most notable storylines highlighted the issue of sexual abuse. In the story Aden struggles to cope with the sexual abuse inflicted on him by his grandfather. Lasance and the serial's writing team worked hard to raise awareness of the "taboo issue". Lasance said he felt he had to do the storyline "one hundred percent justice" because there are people, "more than we probably realise" in real life who have suffered the same as Aden. He felt it was a challenge to play as he did not want victims to think it was unrealistic. Lasance said he had to come onto set each morning in Aden's frame of mind. To research Aden's storyline, he spoke to a relative who had been through a similar situation. He drew inspiration for his portrayal from how his relative had coped and the effects it had on him growing up. Lasance said like his relative, Aden goes through "the huge rebellion years" and the subsequent attempts to "reconnect with those people who had betrayed you." Lasance also received extra training from an acting coach, where he used "haunting" techniques to make himself feel vulnerable like Aden. He also used the storyline to show US agents his acting abilities.

Lasance explained that a common theme in Aden's life is something bad happening just after each time he rebuilds his life. One such bad event is the re-emergence of his alcoholic father, Larry. His arrival sets Aden "on the back foot" again, as most of Aden's childhood issues stemmed from his father's addiction to alcohol. He also explained that alcohol abuse is often seen in victims of abuse, so Aden is angered when Larry admits Aden's grandfather abused him too. "Aden loses it" with Larry, because he has had his last chance in Aden's view. Aden holds his father hostage and withdraws his medication to punish him. Aden has had so much trouble from Larry that those "experiences have made him the way he is now", and the story comes to a culmination with Aden giving up on his father. Aden is admitted into psychiatric care after the incident. However, he initially makes little progress and prefers to help fellow patient Melody Jones (Celeste Dodwell) with her treatment. Lasance said that Aden had been "protective of Melody after Axel Hay (Trent Dalzell) took advantage of her." The pair share an "unspoken bond" because of their past experiences and he "understands exactly what she's going through."

In one storyline Aden's colleague Joey Collins (Kate Bell) is sexually assaulted by Robbo Cruze (Aidan Gillett). Aden and Joey do not get on with each other, however when he finds out about Joey's rape he becomes protective of her. The incident leaves Aden "tormented by his childhood abuse" and he sets out to gain justice for Joey. Lassance said that Aden nearly gives up until he finds out she is a lesbian, and says "he thinks he can prove her case". However, when Robbo threatens Joey, "It's the final straw and Aden snaps", attacking Robbo.

=== Friends and enemies ===
Aden's main enemy throughout his duration is Geoff Campbell (Lincoln Lewis). Aden did not like Geoff because he is talented at football. As Geoff is a strict Christian, Aden sees Geoff representing the "hypocrisy of society". He also believes Geoff is as "full of sin" and "flawed" as everyone else. While their characters clashed on-screen Lasance and Lewis were close friends in real life and learned lines together while they critiqued each other's performances.

In one storyline, Aden loans money from "shady bookie" Clint Mailer (Matt Zeremes). Clint then forces Aden to throw football matches so Clint can win bets. Aden is described as being desperate for money so goes along with the plan. Geoff finds out and is "appalled" by Aden's behaviour, as the storyline progresses Clint tries to force him to end Geoff's career. Lasance added, "Aden tries to get him off the field, but that backfires - and Geoff scores the winning try." This results in Aden being badly assaulted by Clint.

Aden forms an unlikely friendship with Morag Bellingham (Cornelia Frances). In the storyline, Morag wants to know why he has problems because she had "taken a bit of a shine to him". Aden initially doesn't want her help. Whilst interviewed by Digital Spy Frances stated: "There's lots of lovely dialogue that goes on between him and I - I take him under my wing and I find out what's wrong with him." He eventually looks up to her and moves in with her. Frances said: "So I sort of adopt him in a way." Morag is known for her feisty persona, Lasance said Frances was one of his favourite colleagues to work with because she is the complete opposite of Morag. As a pairing they have "collision chemistry" because "they don't really get along, but they do have respect for each other."

=== Relationship with Belle Taylor ===
Aden's main relationship in the programme is with Belle Taylor (Jessica Tovey). When Lasance and Tovey found out their characters would become involved together, both did not think it would work. They both separately approached producer Cameron Welsh and unbeknownst to each other, told him of their concerns about the pairing. However, the pair discovered they shared a "great" dynamic while working together and Lasance said when their storylines intertwined it was "fantastic". Lasance also said they found much of their early screen time comical because "one minute they're in bed, the next they're fighting in the diner." Aden and Belle became so popular with viewers that they "coined a phrase" to name the couple, which was "Adelle". Lasance said that "The Adelle mayhem is crazy. I get a lot of feedback on the internet about it." For the couple to have such a following, he felt like it was a compliment to his and Tovey's work.

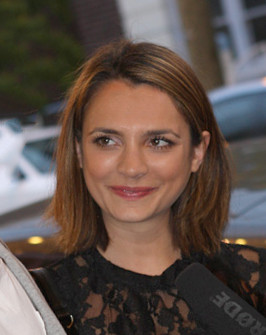
Jessica Tovey (pictured) plays Aden's main love interest, Belle Taylor.

After Aden's breakdown and admission to psychiatric care, Belle grows close to Angelo Rosetta (Luke Jacobz). Tovey said Aden will always be "the love of Belle's life", but she is traumatised by the previous events. Aden witnesses Belle kissing Angelo, which destroys their relationship. Belle is left unsure what to do because she sees Angelo has her "safety net" and Aden "brings out the passion in her". She added that Angelo doesn't compare with her love for Aden, that her relationship with Aden was the "most beautiful" on the programme and that she would never escape her feelings for Aden. Aden later "jumps on Belle" and tells her they are in love and should be together. Tovey said Belle gets "caught in the moment" and they make love. Tovey was unhappy with the fact that Belle cheated, as she thought it was out of character. When Angelo finds out the truth, he publicly humiliates Belle. He later goes around to her home and becomes violent. Belle is later found badly beaten and although Angelo is not responsible, he gets the blame. Jacobz said the under the circumstances he would have thought the same. He added that Aden "hates" Angelo. After Angelo verbally abused Belle, Aden does not "see eye to eye with Angelo" and decides to testify as a witness against Angelo.

Aden and Belle are involved in a storyline where the school's formal is set on fire. Belle becomes trapped and her injuries have "consequences that change their relationship" forever. Lasance had previously been in caught up in a real house fire; he said the director of the episode "milked" the fictional situation to make it seem more dramatic than a real fire. He also stated that in the months following there would be a lot of "tense moments" between the pair. Aden and Belle can acknowledge what they have found in each other - so "it would be hard to split them up". After the attack and fire, Belle refuses to leave the hospital, even with Aden supporting her, because it is the only place she "feels secure". Belle is prescribed with painkillers to help combat her anxiety disorder. However, she becomes addicted to them. Tovey said she does not want Aden to know because of the "shame" and she doesn't want him to know she has failed. She further explained that "addicts withdraw from those around them - which is exactly what she is doing."

When Aden discovers the truth he ends their relationship. Following on with theme of those closest to him battling addiction, Lasance said it reminds Aden of his father's relationship with alcohol. Though Lasance previously said it "would take a lot" to break Belle and Aden up forever, he opined addiction might be the one thing that could. Though Aden later gives Belle a second chance when she recovers. With this Lasance later reaffirmed his belief that "no matter what there is always a deep-rooted connection that can't be broken" between Aden and Belle. Belle is the first person Aden "trusted and fully gave his heart to after the abuse from his grandfather." Aden gives up the chance of attending university to stay with Belle and takes up a "job of convenience" working on the prawn trawler.

=== Marriage and Belle's death ===
"They say there's a fine line between love and hate, and don't these two know it! Their road to romance has been far from smooth, but now they're finally together, not even one of Summer Bay's notorious natural disasters could tear them apart!"

— Virgin Media on Aden and Belle

Belle finds out Aden borrowed money from Clint to pay for her ring. Lasance said it is a "heart-felt moment" and a turning point in their stories, because Belle realises "how far he's willing to go for her". Belle asks Aden to marry her, Lasance explained that it is hard for Aden because "he is blown away" as he wants to marry Belle, but he has traditional values and thought that "the man" should have asked.

In May 2009, Tovey announced that she had filmed her final scenes with Home and Away. Lasance said he was sad but "fortunate" to work alongside Tovey. He credited their off-screen friendship as making Aden and Belle's dynamic develop successfully. In the weeks before filming her final scenes, Tovey asked Welsh how Belle would be written out. It was then she found out that Belle would die shortly after her wedding with Aden. Tovey said she was teary, but pleased with the way Belle would depart. Tovey said that filming her exit scenes were more emotional. Her last scene with Lasance required her to portray Belle's death scene. She added "I had my eyes closed and he was holding me really tight", after the director cut the scene the pair could not separate themselves.

The storyline played out on-screen when Belle discovers she has cancer. Aden only discovers the truth just before their wedding. Belle refuses treatment because her cancer is so advanced she does not want to "prolong her agony". Aden is "confused, devastated, and completely and utterly heartbroken". Lasance said Aden is "destroyed" and feels like he is also dying in the process, because Aden has never given himself to anyone - he feels Belle is a part of him. Tovey explained that Belle is worried about Aden's frame of mind on their wedding day. The scriptwriters played the scenes in a way that kept viewers unsure whether or not Aden would attend his wedding. While Belle "truly believes he will show up", Tovey explains the tone and mood of the wedding is unhappy. Aden marries Belle, and she dies a couple of weeks later.

=== Relationship with Nicole Franklin ===
Aden's best friend during most of his duration was Nicole Franklin (Tessa James). Nicole is the daughter to his surrogate father Roman Harris (Conrad Coleby). When Roman is blinded in a car accident, he takes his anger out on Aden and Nicole. Subsequently, they become "each other's support network" and Lasance said it was not long until they "slipped between the sheets". One of the conditions of Aden's tenancy was to never sleep with Nicole, this makes the pair feel guilty that they had deceived Roman. Lasance felt the storyline was controversial because of the strong fan base for his relationship with Belle - which meant he knew it would "cause a stir" and divide the audience. In January 2010, Nicole and Aden "get up close and personal" and they decided to spend Aden's remaining time in the Bay together.

When the two share another kiss, James told TV Week that there are "a lot of complications" for them. She said that no one knew what was going to happen next and that Nicole felt guilty for betraying Belle because she was her friend. James explained that the pairing with Aden was "a bit more serious and in-depth than Nicole's usual relationships." James opined that Aden was also one of the "nicer guys" for Nicole. When the pair embarked on a relationship. James opined that Aden and Nicole were great together and explained, "they started out having a kind of brother-sister relationship, and that developed into something more." Nicole declared her love for Aden early on in their romance, so he did not reciprocate the gesture. Lasance described the moment whilst interviewed by TV Week stating: "They've always had an awesome connection and Nicole gets into a bit of a comfortable state and blurts out that she loves Aden." Aden appreciated her love for him, however cannot say it back until he felt the same way. It is this that made their relationship "awkward", Nicole tried to withdraw her declaration though Aden realises she meant it.

== Storylines ==
Aden meets Cassie and flirts with her. He ensures that her previous relationship with Ric Dalby (Mark Furze) is definitely over, then asks Cassie out. Her acceptance makes Ric jealous, so during a game of rugby, he tackles Aden so hard that he is knocked unconscious and hospitalised. Aden's brother Sean (Gabriel Egan) attacks Ric in retaliation, and when Aden recovers, he gives Sean a false alibi. Cassie discovers the truth and breaks up with him. Aden next appears as a rival of Geoff's on the school football team. Annoyed that PE teacher Tony Holden (Jon Sivewright) favours Geoff, Aden spikes Geoff's drink and locks him in the boot of Tony's car. Tony throws Aden off the team, so Aden vandalises Geoff's grandfather's farm, and bullies Geoff and his younger sister Annie (Charlotte Best).

After a party Aden attends with his classmate Matilda Hunter (Indiana Evans), Cassie drives them home. She is under the influence of alcohol, and when Aden becomes high on marijuana and taunts her, she crashes. Aden sustains a leg injury that ends his chance of becoming a professional footballer. When Geoff refuses the chance to take up professional football, Aden intensifies his bullying of him. In return, Geoff punches Aden and knocks him out. Aden later helps an inebriated Annie, who has had her drink spiked. Tony and Geoff presume that Aden was responsible as he was previously involved in similar prank with Tamsyn Armstrong (Gabrielle Scollay), and Annie lies to get Aden into trouble. The rest of the town believe he is to blame, so he seeks help from local lawyer Morag. Annie's guardian Irene Roberts (Lynne McGranger) hits Aden and injures his bad leg, which prompts him to file a claim against her. Annie admits that she lied, hoping that Aden will drop the lawsuit, but he refuses. He speaks to a journalist about Irene, which annoys Belle, Irene's lodger who is also a journalist. Belle writes an article of her own about Aden's war veteran grandfather, Stan, much to Aden's distress. He attacks Belle, sets fire to her article and cries.

Alf Stewart (Ray Meagher) tells Aden that he should behave in a manner his grandfather would be proud of. This upsets Aden, and he tries to cause trouble at school. When Cassie discovers she has HIV, Aden becomes irate at the prospect that she may have infected him in the car accident. After his tests come back negative, he cries in disappointment. His doctor, Rachel Armstrong (Amy Mathews), suggests that Aden may need counselling, but he refuses. When Aden's alcoholic father Larry throws him out, he is taken in by his friend Roman. Aden is upset to learn that Roman was in the army like his grandfather, and visits the structurally damaged local diner to be alone. The ceiling collapses and Aden is seriously injured. In the aftermath, Larry tells Rachel that Aden was abused by his grandfather as a child. Aden cannot face going home, so moves in with Roman more permanently. He is attracted to Roman's daughter Nicole, but does not pursue her out of respect for Roman. Instead, Aden kisses Belle, but deflects her attempts to take things further. She goes on a date with Angelo Rosetta (Luke Jacobz), which prompts a jealous Aden to admit that he could not sleep with her because of the abuse he suffered as a child. When Larry injures himself while drunk, he is found by his son, and admits that Aden's grandfather also abused him. Aden holds Larry, Rachel and Belle hostage so that his father cannot receive medical assistance, but they are rescued by Angelo. Aden is forced into counselling, and begins to come to terms with his abuse.

Belle and Aden grow close again, and begin seeing one another in secret, as Belle is still dating Angelo. Aden's relationship with her deteriorates when Belle develops post-traumatic stress disorder after being attacked. She later refuses to leave hospital after being injured in a fire, and becomes addicted to the prescription medication that she takes for anxiety. Aden's feelings for Nicole are reignited, and they have sex several times before being caught together by Belle. Roman throws Aden out for sleeping with his daughter. Drug addict Liam Murphy (Axle Whitehead) deepens the rift between Aden and Belle, but they eventually reconcile and become engaged. In order to pay for a wedding ring, Aden takes a loan from corrupt bookmaker Clint, and loses several football matches on Clint's instruction. He refuses to ruin Geoff's career by injuring him, however, so Clint has Aden beaten up. Belle learns that she has terminal cancer and pushes the wedding forward, but does not tell Aden. He is devastated to learn of her condition the day before the ceremony, but is convinced to go ahead with the wedding by Roman. He and Belle spend four weeks together as husband and wife before she dies. Following her death, Aden becomes reclusive. He eventually returns to work, and is saved by Geoff when he almost drowns in an accident, which results in them becoming friends.

Several months after Belle's death, Aden and Nicole begin a relationship, which becomes strained when Nicole tells him that she loves him, but Aden does not return the sentiment. A repentant Aden pays Nicole more attention and they are able to get their romance back on track. Aden's brother Justin (Matthew Walker) is involved in a car accident, which causes short-term memory loss, but prompts him to admit that he too was abused by their grandfather. He regains his memory, and recalls that Larry was in the car at the time of the accident. He and Aden find their father dead. Convinced that the police will think Justin killed him, Aden decides that they should bury Larry. The police become suspicious nonetheless, and the two are arrested for murder, until a phone call made to Aden's phone from Larry confirms that he caused his own death by irresponsible driving. Justin convinces Aden to move to the city. When Nicole refuses to go with him, he leaves anyway.

== Reception ==
Lasance was nominated in the category of "Best Bad Boy" at the 2008 Inside Soap Awards. Lasance won the award for "Most Popular Actor" at the 2009 Logie Awards, for his portrayal of Aden. He was nominated in the same category at the 2010 ceremony. The Daily Record said that Aden and Belle were "star-crossed lovers". That if "there's one thing guaranteed to ruin a wedding it's the news that the bride has got weeks to live." They opined that Aden was "blissfully unaware" for weeks and it "burst his bubble", which led them to question if he would actually turn up for the wedding. They later said they felt sympathy for Aden and Justin, because they have been "through an awful lot". They added Aden should feel "slightly relieved" when Charlie questions him about his car accident. Also adding that they were "thankful" Aden was there to give Justin some "much needed support".

Amy Edwards of The Newcastle Herald opined that Aden and Belle's wedding was a "tear-jerker of an episode". She added that losing Belle was a "sad loss for many fans" because Aden and Belle were a popular couple of the show. While Victoria Jack from the publication said Aden is the serial's "bad-boy-turned-good". TV Week readers voted Aden as the character they were most concerned about in the aftermath of the formal explosion. Holy Soap said Aden's most memorable moment was "having a breakdown and threatening to kill his father while holding Belle and Rachel hostage."
