= Martha MacKenzie =

Fictional character from the Australian Channel Seven soap opera Home and Away

- Home and Away character
- Jodi Gordon as Martha MacKenzie (2009)
- Portrayed by: Burcin Kapkin (1988); Jodi Gordon (2005–10)
- Duration: 1988, 2005–2010
- First appearance: 8 September 1988
- Last appearance: 9 June 2010
- Introduced by: Alan Bateman (1988); Julie McGauran (2005)
- Book appearances: Home and Away: Family Matters
In-universe information
- Other names: Martha Stewart (birth name); Martha Holden (married name)
- Occupation: Electrician; Pole dancer Farmer
- Father: Brett Macklin
- Mother: Roo Stewart
- Adoptive mother: Pauline MacKenzie
- Brothers: Michael MacKenzie (adoptive); Greg Mackenzie (adoptive)
- Husband: Jack Holden (2006–07, 2008–09)
- Daughters: Lindsay MacKenzie
- Grandfathers: Alf Stewart; Gordon Macklin
- Grandmothers: Martha Stewart; Mrs. Macklin
- Uncles: Owen Dalby; Duncan Stewart
- Aunts: Quinn Jackson; Stacey Macklin
- First cousins: Ric Dalby; Bryce Stewart; Ryder Jackson
- Other relatives: Colleen Smart; Morag Bellingham; Bobby Simpson

Martha MacKenzie (also Stewart and Holden) is a fictional character from the Australian Channel Seven soap opera Home and Away, played by Jodi Gordon. Martha made her first on-screen appearance on 8 September 1988. She was originally played by Burcin Kapkin. In 2005, the character returned to Home and Away, played by Jodi Gordon. Gordon was a model and she took acting lessons before auditioning for the role. Gordon won a Logie Award for "Most Popular New Female Talent" in 2006 and she earned several more award nominations for her portrayal of Martha. Martha returned on screen on 30 March 2005.

Martha was described as being friendly, feisty and fun loving. Martha's appearance has evolved throughout her time in the show: she was initially a tomboy who loved sport, but she later became a stylish woman. Upon her return in March 2005, Martha's storylines saw her surviving a helicopter crash, having an abortion and a miscarriage, battling alcoholism, being diagnosed with breast cancer and becoming a widow after her husband was shot. In a controversial storyline Martha worked as a pole dancer; the scenes were criticised by the broadcasting regulator for their content. Whilst playing Martha, Gordon was at the center of a number of personal scandals, which put her future in the show in doubt. In January 2010, it was announced that Gordon was leaving the show and Martha departed on 9 June 2010.

== Casting ==
The character was created as part of Roo Stewart's (Justine Clarke) teenage pregnancy storyline. The character's on-screen birth aired on 8 September 1988. The writers added some jeopardy to the storyline as Roo goes into labour prematurely and there are medical complications, leaving both Roo and the baby in danger. Clarke filmed around fifteen scenes of her character in labour, before she gives birth to a baby girl. The role of Martha was originally played by Burcin Kapkin, who was one-month old when she was cast.

In 2005, the character was reintroduced to the show and the part was recast to model Jodi Gordon. Gordon took acting lessons before successfully auditioning for the role. Gordon later revealed that she was initially nervous about auditioning due to her lack of acting experience. However, producers gave her two months prior to filming so she could learn her scripts and gain more acting skills. Gordon said: "I'd never done any acting. So I did a few little acting course things and then I kind of fluked the part".

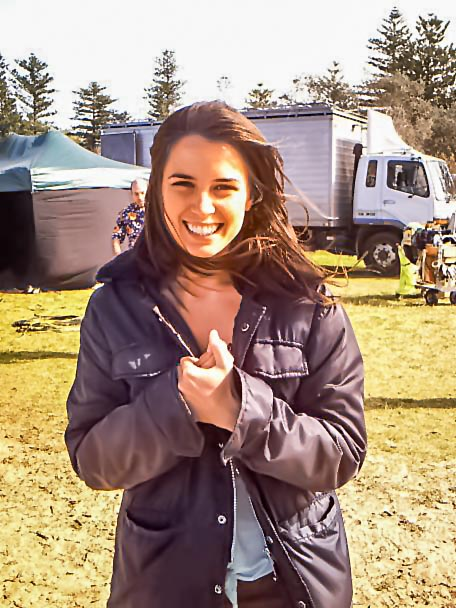
Jodi Gordon on the set on Home and Away, taking a break from filming as Martha. (2006)

During March 2007, Gordon was written out of the show indefinitely after her partner, Chris Burkhardt, died from cancer. The Home and Away writers had previously rewritten several scripts to allow Gordon to spend as much time as possible with Burkhardt.

In 2009, Gordon became the center of media attention due to a series of scandals in her private life. The serial's home network Channel Seven decided to support Gordon through the ordeals. The scandals cast doubt over whether Gordon would be staying with the serial and it was reported that she wanted to leave Australia for other roles. However, it was later confirmed she would be staying with the show and a spokesperson said, "Jodi is looking forward, not backward, and is hard at work on the set of Home and Away". Gordon was backed by her fellow cast members and fans of her character, who voiced their support for her. At the time Gordon was signed to appear in the serial for another two years after she had signed to a three-year contract.

== Character development ==
=== Characterisation ===
Channel Seven described Martha as being "Friendly, straight down the line, and with a great enthusiasm for life", and Jetstar magazine called Martha "a feisty addition to the Stewart family". Gordon described Martha's persona stating: "Martha's pretty feisty all of the time but in the sense of always fighting for what's right and keeping up a strong perspective on where I want to go, things like that." Gordon says that she feels Martha always makes bad choices when it comes to her love life, because she never knows what she wants. Gordon said that Martha is "messed up" but with a "warm side" to her persona, and that overall Martha is "fun loving, easy going girl-next-door" type character. Of her portrayal, Gordon says that she enjoys the challenge of playing Martha because she gets to shout a lot when showing her crazy and fun side. Gordon later said that "There will always be a little bit of trouble attached to Martha. She will always be a little bit mischievous". On the character's appearance, RTÉ said "Martha was a self-confessed tomboy, loving sport and anything physical. Now she has grown into a stylish woman with great taste in clothes which range from shorts and strappy tops to gorgeous summer dresses."

=== Relationship with Jack Holden ===
Most of Martha's storylines were central to her on-off relationship with Jack Holden (Paul O'Brien). Viewers saw the couple go through marriage, divorce, a second marriage and Martha being widowed. Holy Soap said that Martha and Jack proved to be one of the "best loved couples", before they married for the first time. However, their marriage does not last long and they split. Martha and Jack start to lead separate lives, but Jack is there for Martha after she has an abortion. Martha is feeling low at this point and kisses him; Jack's girlfriend Sam Tolhurst (Jessica Chapnik) sees this. O'Brien stated: "I think Jack felt like 'Oh this is nice, but I've moved on, I've finally moved on and found someone', but deep down he still wants Martha." Martha is left "shattered" after Jack plans to marry Sam. Martha was caught trying on Sam's wedding dress as she tried to figure out if she still had feelings for Jack. Gordon said that from day one, Jack and Martha have wanted to be together, but "they're never in the same headspace". O'Brien added that he believes Jack was always in love with Martha, even whilst he was in a relationship with Sam. Both O'Brien and Gordon agreed that when Jack and Martha first broke up it was a bad time for Jack, as his life was spiraling out of control, he needed her, but she left him when he needed her the most. They later become friends; O'Brien believed it was hard to understand how Jack could be so forgiving toward her.

Although the characters were separated on screen, they had gained a fan base on the Internet that believed Martha should be with Jack and wanted the pair to reunite. Gordon herself backed the pairing, stating that she believed they should be together. She said: "I actually love Jack and Martha together, I'm a sucker for romance so, I want want them to be together [...] I want them to continue on, [...] the timing is not right, they are not mature enough. Jack's in a relationship with someone else as Martha is, there just seems to be things getting in the way of them getting back together all the time." Gordon also hoped for a happy ending for the two characters if they were to ever leave the serial adding: "If I had it my way, and I got to write the scripts then I'd make it happily ever after, Martha and Jack riding off into the sunset." Gordon has spoken of her understanding from the audiences point of view, that together Jack and Martha are "the ultimate couple". She also reiterated her belief that it would be to tough at the time of Martha's downward spiral for them to work together, but if Martha is to get through her troubles and have a happy ending, that it would be with Jack. The Daily Telegraph commented on the Martha and Jack situation, saying it is played out in a "classic soapie technique". They said "Bring the characters together, push them apart, but always leave open the possibility that they could get back together. It has worked for Days of Our Lives' John Black and Marlena Evans".

On-screen Jack and Martha later reconcile, after he helps her through her hard times. Gordon believed that their relationship was at its strongest peak whilst Martha had breast cancer. She added that Martha would do anything to avoid jeopardising their happiness.

=== Downward spiral and stripping ===
One of the most notable story lines for Martha was her secret life as a pole dancer and subsequent road into alcoholism. This was a result of her abortion and failed relationships with Jack and Ash Nader (Ben Geurens) along with her new relationship with Cameron "Cam" Reynolds (Ashley Lyons), who was leading her astray. The story line began playing out from the 2006 "cliffhanger" episode, when Ash reveals that he is married with children and leading a double life. Gordon branded Martha as ignorant to the situation she has got herself into: "I think she is so naive, she wants to believe that she's found a great guy and she keeps giving him second chances. She wants to make it work." Martha fails to cope with the situation, as Gordon describes: "It's this whole emotional roller-coaster that, if you don't deal with your life, can be terrible." Their relationship falls apart after Martha aborts Ash's child, causing Martha to begin her transition into a party girl. Gordon commented that "I think everyone in this show begins as a scruffy bum and gradually they turn you into a glamour puss."

I think Martha was attracted to Cam because he is this older guy, Martha's never really gone out with older guys ... Cam's powerful, he owns a club, he's got a lot of money and he owns a car ... He had this power and he kind of came along and scooped her up and just took her on this wild ride and Martha's just not in a state where she has got her head screwed on properly, she's just gone along on this ride and not thinking about anything she's doing and I think Cam's been pretty good at manipulating her.

— Gordon interviewed by Yahoo in 2007

Martha begins a downward spiral and is manipulated by new boyfriend Cam, who has a hold over her due to his power and money, and her vulnerable state - he "swept her off her feet". Cam always got the better of Martha because "The worse it got with her family, the better it got with Cam." O'Brien, who played Jack, said that he felt that Martha was trying to reinvent herself as a different person.

Martha pole dancing, a notable storyline and a scene that caused outrage in Australia for its G rated content. (2007)

Gordon pointed out that Martha was not stripping, just pole dancing. Gordon took pole dancing lessons for a period of a few weeks funded by Channel Seven, and found the experience embarrassing and physically challenging. She found it hard dancing in front of her fellow cast members, commenting that "There's even one scene when all of the boys turn up at the club and they're looking at me – it's like having your mates seeing you half naked. It's not very nice, a bit intimidating but it's always exciting to have a challenging story line like that. It's worth while in the end knowing that you've put everything into it." Gordon believed that the storyline was a turning point in Martha's development, as she has to hit rock bottom to realise who she is and what she really wants from life.

After everyone finds out about Martha's situation, they try to stop her working in the club. Kate Ritchie who plays on-screen friend Sally Fletcher discussed how Martha would not take any advice from those closest to her and how Sally and Alf have to pick up the pieces for her in the end. She compared Martha's pole dancing to many real life experiences ordinary people go through. Sally's interference made Martha's situation worse, of this Ritche added: "It's been hard for Sally to realise and Alf as well, just that you just have to stand back and let it run its course and be there at the end." Of Martha's downward spiral and pushing her friends away, Gordon stated: "Now she's found herself in this hole, she ruined all these relationships with her family, her friends, Jack, everyone's trying to help her and she's really against everyone, she's in a really bad place at the moment".

The broadcast scenes proved to be controversial in Australia after broadcasting regulator ACMA felt the scenes featured sexual content. They noted that "ACMA determined that pole-dancing scenes contained in the programmes contained visual depictions of sexual behaviour, that their impact was higher than very mild, and that the episodes were not suitable for children to watch without supervision." Channel Seven defended the scenes and stated that whereas most episodes of the serial are PG rated they would take extra care to inform viewers of G rated episodes and to include material more suitable for children. Two years after the storyline aired, Gordon was reported to be a regular visitor to strip clubs as a result of her earlier visits whilst filming the storyline.

=== Pregnancy and breast cancer ===
In 2008, viewers saw Martha coming to terms with a second pregnancy. The storyline began after Martha left old boyfriend Roman Harris (Conrad Coleby) for Jack. She was unsure of the child's paternity, but kept it a secret from Jack. Gordon said this is "Because she doesn't think he ever needs to know. Roman's said he doesn't want to be involved and he wants to say it's Jack's. And so does Martha..." After Martha has a miscarriage scare, Roman wanted to know if the baby was his. Gordon explained that "Roman says he needs to know if he is or isn't the baby's father and Martha has to agree to do a DNA test. [...] They wait till Jack's out of the room then quickly arrange it. Martha's so scared of losing Jack she wants the facts before deciding her next step." Martha's relationship with Jack was at its strongest at that time, but Gordon was concerned about Martha's lies: "Martha and Jack have been through more than most and right now their relationship is as solid as it could be. But she's taking a big chance not being honest about her pregnancy." She described Roman being the baby's father as "Martha's worst nightmare".

During the pregnancy storyline, Martha was also diagnosed with breast cancer. The storyline was introduced just over a year after Gordon's partner, Chris Burkhardt, died from acute myeloid leukemia at the age of 23. Gordon drew on her experience with Burkhardt to take on the storyline. Home and Away's producer, Cameron Welsh, approached Gordon about the storyline and asked her if she would be comfortable doing it. Gordon called it an "amazing opportunity to be given". Gordon said "The producer asked me if I wanted to do this storyline and made sure I was comfortable doing it based on what I had been through, I definitely think this one tops all of them". Gordon added that anyone going through Martha's ordeal would find it hard, but "you just look to your friends and family and do your best in that situation and then move on".

Gordon and the writers researched the condition and made sure that the storyline "was pretty precise when it came to the medical and physical issues". A couple of months before they started filming, everyone got together to discuss the storyline and map out the journey it would take. Viewers saw the character discovering a lump in her breast, going against doctors' advice about terminating her pregnancy and subsequently going through with treatment for the cancer. Gordon later admitted that she found it "very tough".

=== Departure ===
In January 2010, it was announced that Gordon had decided to leave the show. She asked Channel Seven to release her two years early from her contract. Producers and network executives had urged her to stay with the show because her character was popular with viewers. Gordon said, "I've had a wonderful five years with Channel Seven and Home and Away—it's been an amazing experience to be a part of this incredible show. I've learnt so much." Gordon filmed her final scenes at the end of February. Fellow Actor Ray Meagher who plays Martha's grandfather Alf Stewart backed her decision to leave the show, but said he was sad that his character would be left on-screen without any blood relatives.

The character's final scenes aired on 9 June 2010, as she goes on the run with her love interest Hugo Austin, played by Bernard Curry. Curry reprised his role in order to "bring closure" to Martha's storyline and facilitate her exit from the show. In the lead up to their exit, Hugo, who had been in witness protection because of his involvement in a people smuggling ring, becomes the target of corrupt police detective Gordon Eaves (Lewis Fitz-Gerald), who wants him dead. Carolyn Stewart of TV Week confirmed that six characters would be at risk of being shot as part of the storyline, including Hugo, Martha, and Angelo, before two leave for good. Speaking of the plot, Gordon stated: "Martha and Hugo just want to be together. She doesn't want to lose the man she loves again. She'll fight for him with everything she has."

== Storylines ==
After falling pregnant by Brett Macklin (Gerry Sont), Ruth Stewart (Justine Clarke) gave birth to Martha. However, she decided to give Martha up for adoption to a family called the MacKenzies. Martha grew up on her new family's farm. Her adoptive parents died, leaving Martha with the farm and her adoptive brothers. Martha then went in search of her biological parents. Brett did not want to know her, but she managed to form a relationship with Ruth and went to live with her in New York. Her grandfather, Alf, and her great-aunt, Morag (Cornelia Frances), came to visit and Martha chose to return to Australia to live with her relatives.

Martha stays in Summer Bay with Alf and she gets to know him and her cousin Ric Dalby (Mark Furze). She begins dating Jesse McGregor (Ben Unwin), but it does not last. She starts feuding with Jack Holden and they realise they are falling in love with each other. They later begin a relationship. Martha plays a joke on Jack, which goes wrong and he hits his head. At the hospital, Jack is told he is deaf. Jack blames Martha for the accident and they split up.

Martha then begins a relationship with Jack's best friend, Corey Henderson (Adam Saunders), after he saves her from a violent man. Corey begins a hate campaign against Irene Roberts (Lynne McGranger) and starts poisoning her with mercury, leading to her being sectioned. Martha finds out the truth about Corey and he chases her through the outback and holds her hostage. Jack saves her and Corey is sent to prison.

Martha becomes best friends with Tasha Andrews (Isabel Lucas). Tasha gets involved in a cult called "The Believers" and she is later raped. Martha tries to help save Tasha but Jonah Abraham (James Mitchell) kidnaps her. Jonah is later sent to prison for kidnapping and rape. Jack and Martha get back together, become engaged and marry. At their wedding reception, Eve Jacobsen (Emily Perry) causes an explosion. Most of the guests are injured and they are rushed to the hospital. Martha is part of a group with serious burns, that are taken by a helicopter, which crashes in the outback. Martha and the others are lost in the bush for days, but they are eventually found. Not long after, Martha's marriage to Jack breaks down.

Martha meets and sleeps with a man called Ash. Jack decides he wants Martha back, but when Martha reveals she has slept with Ash, Jack is heartbroken because Ash turns out to be his former best friend. As Martha and Ash take their relationship further she is shocked to find out he is married with children. He tells Martha he has left his wife, but Martha finds out that his wife is pregnant with their third child. Martha ends their relationship and she finds out that she is pregnant. Martha has an abortion, which leads her to start drinking heavily.

Martha starts dating Cam Reynolds and he encourages her to work at his pole dancing club. Martha becomes the star pole dancer at the venue after Cam manipulates her. Peter Baker (Nicholas Bishop) has a stag night at the venue and Martha is caught pole dancing by Jack, Ric and Tony Holden (Jon Sivewright). Jack is annoyed with Martha's new life and tries to convince her to leave Cam. Cam sets fire to his club and Martha is left trapped inside until Jack saves her. Jack and Martha become good friends once more, until they sign their divorce papers. Jack then begins a relationship with Sam Tolhurst which devastates Martha.

Martha bumps into Jonah, who is now going by the name of Michael. Martha tries to get him out of town, vandalises his van and verbally abuses him. She falls into a mine shaft with him and he saves her. They grow closer and later they start a relationship, which no one approves of. Martha looks after Jack while he is in a coma after he is shot. Jack reveals he still loves her, but he decides to stand by Sam. Martha realises she loves Jack as well as Michael. She and Michael leave town, but Martha returns days later to stop Jack and Sam's wedding, but she fails.

Sam commits suicide by taking heroin and Martha is suspected of her murder, but she is later proved innocent. Jack and Martha grow close again, but Martha begins seeing Roman. Martha and Jack later get back together and decide to marry. Martha discovers she is pregnant, but she is not sure if the father is Jack or Roman. Following a paternity test, it is revealed that the baby is Roman's. Martha is diagnosed with breast cancer and is told she needs a termination for her own health. She decides not to and Jack is angry because it means she might die. Jack and Martha decide to get married again. Martha collapses and has to be resuscitated. She also discovers that she has lost the baby. Martha begins to recover and later goes into remission.

Martha then suffers the pain of losing Jack when he is accidentally shot by Angelo Rosetta (Luke Jacobz). Whilst grieving, Jack's cousins, Xavier (David Jones-Roberts) and Hugo Austin (Curry) arrive in Summer Bay for the funeral and she takes them into her home. Martha later falls for Hugo and they begin a relationship. A few months later, Martha is led to believe that Hugo is going to propose to her, but instead he ends their relationship, leaving Martha confused and upset. Martha is then kidnapped by Hugo's ex-wife Suzy Sudiro (Tasneem Roc). Angelo saves Martha and she assists him with the capture and arrest of Derrick Quaid (John Atkinson).

Martha discovers that Hugo is part of a people smuggling racket and she tells him that she wants nothing more to do with him. Martha then believes that she has witnessed Hugo's murder. She later discovers that he is alive and that he went into a witness protection programme. Some criminals come after Hugo and his family. Martha, Xavier and Gina Austin (Sonia Todd) are captured and held hostage. Hugo and Tony manage to overcome the criminals and the others manage to free themselves from drowning in a tank at Martha's farm.

Detective Gordon Eaves (Fitz-Gerald) is sent to the Bay. Hugo, who is hiding at Martha's farm, overhears him and recognises him as the cop that he and the others paid off when he was involved in the people smuggling racket. Martha makes this aware to Angelo who agrees to go to Martha's farm with Eaves. On the way, Eaves threatens Angelo to go along with his plans. Eaves shoots Hugo and then flees the scene. Hugo is rushed indoors and Martha phones local doctor, Rachel Armstrong (Amy Mathews). Eaves is caught by Angelo, Tony and Charlie Buckton (Esther Anderson). Angelo then arrests both Hugo and Martha. As Angelo is driving them to the police station, he suddenly stops and lets them out. He tells Hugo to punch him to make it look like he and Martha had overpowered him and escaped. Martha thanks Angelo for letting them leave together. Hugo and Martha use Angelo's police car to escape and they flee the Bay, leaving behind their family and friends.

== Reception ==
Gordon has earned various awards nominations for her portrayal of Martha. In 2006, Gordon won a Logie Award for "Most Popular New Female Talent". The 2009 ceremony saw Gordon nominated for "Most Popular Actress". Gordon was nominated for the "Best Newcomer" Award and "Best Couple" with co-star Paul O'Brien at the 2006 Inside Soap Awards. Gordon was nominated for "Sexiest Female" and "Best Storyline" for Jack and Martha's wedding day at the 2007 Inside Soap Awards. The following year, Gordon was again nominated for "Sexiest Female", she was also nominated for "Best Couple" along with co-star Paul O'Brien once more. Gordon was once again nominated for "Sexiest Female" in 2009. At the first Digital Spy Soap Awards, Gordon was nominated for "Sexiest Female" and "Best On-Screen Partnership" with O'Brien. At the 2009 Australian Cosmopolitan "Fun, Fearless Female Women of the Year awards", Gordon was nominated in the TV category.

Holy Soap describe Martha's most memorable moments as finding out she has cancer and that Jack (whom in their opinion was her true love) had been shot. Martha and Jack were included in Virgin Media's feature on the "Soaps' sexiest couples". Virgin Media said that the couple "loved getting hitched so much that they did it twice", and that they "had more hurdles to overcome than an Olympic athlete".

In 2010, it was announced that an episode of Home and Away featuring Martha and Liam had been was deemed too "raunchy" for New Zealand television. The Broadcasting Standards Authority decided to uphold a complaint about a scene between the characters, which saw them sharing a passionate kiss before Martha showed her bra. The scene was said to be too "sexually charged" for its G rating. This was the first time that a complaint about Home and Away's sexual content had been upheld. Ray Meagher later defended the scenes stating he didn't understand what all the fuss was about, branding it as tame compared to the scenes involving guns that aired previously.

In 2018, writers for TV Week included Martha in their feature on the "Top 20 Home And Away characters of all time". They wrote, "Martha holds a special place in the hearts of long-time fans because she was born to the teenage Roo (Justine Clarke) in the show's first year. When Martha arrived back in the Bay in 2005 – played by ex-model Jodi rather than Burcin Kapkin – she was definitely all grown up. The image of her working as a pole dancer in a tiny skirt is etched into the memory of many viewers. When Martha wasn't dancing, she spent much of her time narrowly avoiding death."
