= Angelo Rosetta =

- Home and Away character
- Portrayed by: Luke Jacobz
- Duration: 2008–2011, 2020
- First appearance: 8 July 2008
- Last appearance: 26 November 2020
- Introduced by: Cameron Welsh (2008); Lucy Addario (2020)
In-universe information
- Occupation: Police sergeant; Restaurant owner; Detective
- Mother: Carla Rosetta
- Brothers: Paulie Rosetta
- Wife: Taylor Rosetta

Angelo Rosetta is a fictional character from the Australian television soap opera Home and Away, played by Luke Jacobz. He made his debut during the episode broadcast on 8 July 2008. He has been central to many notable storylines including shooting dead Jack Holden (Paul O'Brien), his time working as a sergeant of Summer Bay's police force and his relationship with Charlie Buckton (Esther Anderson). In 2011, it was revealed that Jacobz had been written out of the serial as producers felt there was "nowhere else to go" with Angelo. The character departed on 21 June 2011. In February 2020, it was announced that Jacobz had agreed to reprise the role and he returned as Angelo on 13 August 2020. Angelo comes back to the Bay to investigate a murder, having been reinstated to the police force. Actress Annabelle Stephenson was cast as Angelo's wife Taylor Rosetta. His final appearance aired on 26 November 2020.

== Casting ==
Actor Luke Jacobz joined the cast of Home and Away in June 2008, following the cancellation of McLeod's Daughters, with which he had a recurring role. He previously appeared in the serial in the 1990s as three different guest characters. Jacobz told a TV Week writer that producers were looking for "an outgoing Italian", and while Jacobz is not Italian, he decided to attend the audition anyway. He had recently relocated from South Australia to Sydney to sign up to work as a labourer when he received the offer to play Angelo. He was on set filming his first scenes four days later. Jacobz was originally signed to the show for six months.

== Development ==
=== Characterisation ===
Jacobz said Angelo is "of Italian extraction", but his family is from the north, which explains his lighter hair colour. He described him as "really confident with the ladies in his job as a police officer – he thinks he's a bit of alright." He also thought Angelo was a combination of himself and his character Patrick from McLeod Daughters. The serial's official website describe Angelo stating: "Growing up in a close-knit family; with three brothers, Angelo was generally perceived as the loudmouth, boofhead kid who would never amount to much." They also state that his passion to solve crimes leads him to step over the line. Angelo has been portrayed as having a very confident manner, during an interview with Yahoo!7 Jacobz describes his characters stating: "He's a cheeky cop. He's very confident. He's not arrogant at all, it's not as if he's got attitude. He's a confident guy, and he knows what he's doing in the police force. He like the ladies. He's outgoing and he's always in a good mood."

Jacobz said Angelo searches for love upon his arrival. stating: "He's looking for the right one – He's shopping around". Angelo immediately asks his colleague Charlie Buckton (Esther Anderson) out to dinner, which surprises her. Jacobz teased that Angelo would have a date or two in the future, but not necessarily with Charlie. Angelo and Charlie date, but later split up. He begins dating May Stone (Alin Sumarwata), Charlie becomes jealous. Of the storyline commented on Angelo stating: "She admits part of her wanted to cause trouble, but Angelo is still attracted to Charlie and they sleep together." However Angelo doesn't want to reunite with her straight away, Anderson comments that Angelo is left wanting to do the right thing and stand by May.

=== Shooting Jack Holden ===
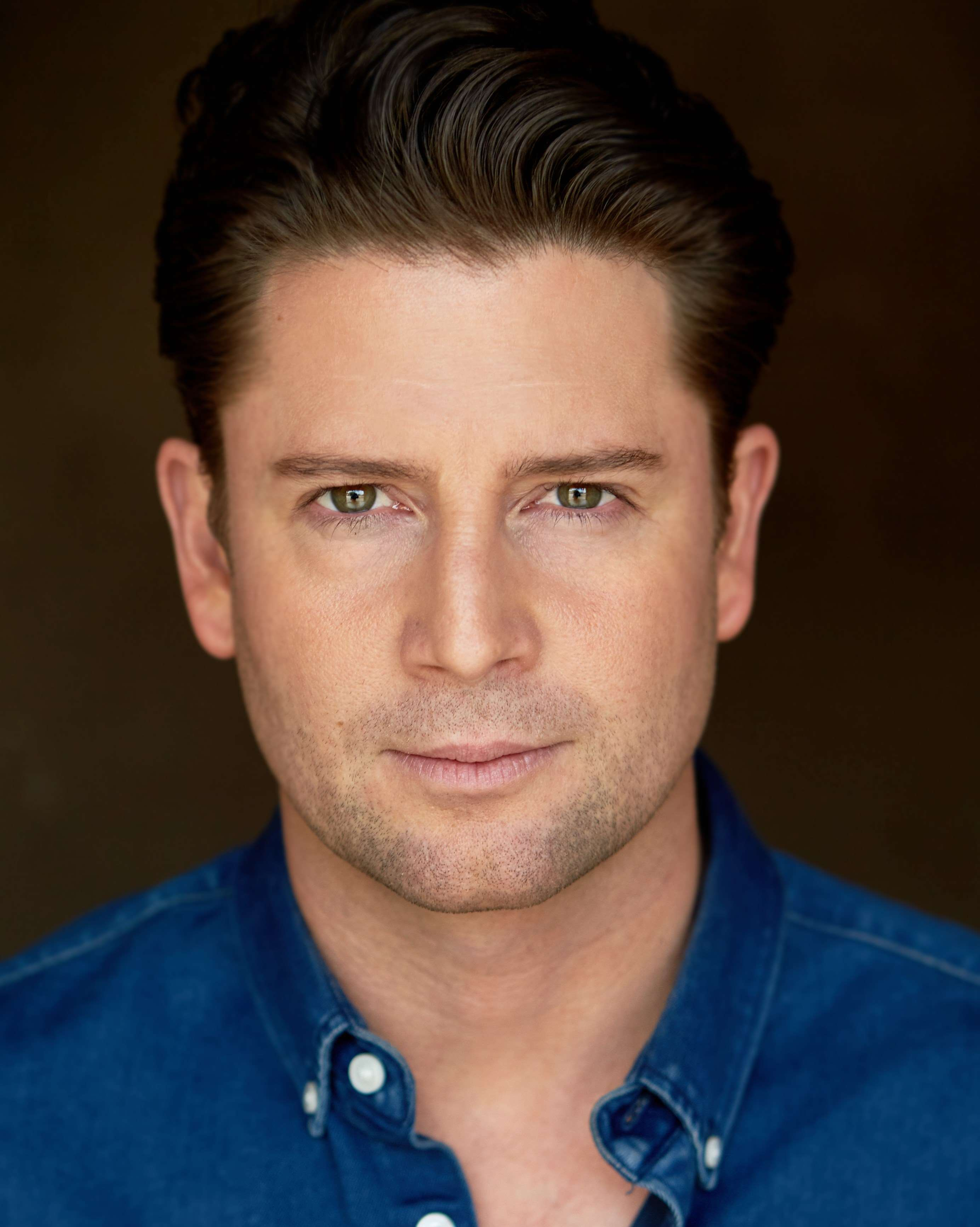
Angelo shoots and kills Jack Holden, played by Paul O'Brien (pictured), leading to him being dubbed "Summer Bay's most hated citizen".

Towards the end of 2008, Angelo shoots and kills fellow officer Jack Holden (Paul O'Brien). Jacobz believed Angelo lost all sympathy from viewers, as Jack was a popular character. He relished played Summer Bay's most hated character, saying "For many years I've played the likeable characters that never do anything wrong, so it's been great to walk into a room and have daggers thrown at you. It's good playing a character that isn't liked. Everyone hates him and it's been great to play something new." Angelo is eventually charged with Jack's murder. Jacobz told an Inside Soap columnist that Angelo has been consumed with guilt since the shooting, and he has no doubts that he killed Jack. But his lawyer finds some new evidence concerning a second gunshot during the investigation, which offers Angelo "a glimmer of hope". Until it is proved, Angelo decides to change his plea to not guilty. Charlie is forced to tell Jack's widow Martha MacKenzie (Jodi Gordon) the news, and Jacobz said that she is "distressed" and does not want Angelo to go free because of a technicality. During a walk-through of the crime scene, Martha confronts Angelo and accuses him of trying to get away with Jack's murder. Jacobz stated "He understands where she's coming from. Martha's life has been ripped apart. Angelo's prepared to take responsibility for that, but if there's a chance that he didn't kill Jack, he has to explore it."

Angelo temporarily leaves the Bay, but in "a dramatic twist" he returns to conduct a special investigation. Jacobz told Jason Herbison of Inside Soap that Angelo left the Bay as the most hated man in town, so no one is pleased to see him back. They are also struggling to accept that he was acquitted of Jack's murder. Jacobz said that Angelo understands how they feel, as he does not want to be in the Bay either, but he had no choice. Angelo now works for Marine Area Command and is trying to find a shark who has attacked and killed a person, after a severed hand washes up on the beach. Angelo and his team are tasked with trying to find out who the hand belongs to and what happened. Jacobz joked that while everyone is worried about further attacks, some of the locals are more scared of Angelo. Angelo apologises to Jack's father Tony Holden (Jon Sivewright) for his return and assures him that he will be leaving as soon as the case is solved. He later learns that Martha is so scared of him, she will not leave her home. Jacobz commented "Angelo feels terrible, and wants to assure her she has no reason to fear him." He visits Martha, who barely speaks due to shock, but she later unleashes her pent-up anger on him when they meet again. Jacobz said "she lets Angelo know exactly what she thinks of him!" The actor also teased that the severed hand would be the beginning of a bigger mystery, which unfolds over several months.

=== Brother's arrival ===
Producers introduced the character's younger brother Paulie Rosetta (Ryan Johnson) in August 2010, leading to further exploration of Angelo's fictional backstory. Speaking with Carolyn Stewart of TV Week, Johnson said Paulie "has always been the starry-eyed dreamer in the family" and his "desire to think big" has often landed him in trouble. Growing up, Paulie was always doing crazy things and Angelo had to bail him out. Angelo is not happy to see his brother in town, especially when he starts flirting with Charlie. Johnson commented that Paulie's arrival surprises Angelo, and as he has had to take the blame for his brother's mistakes in the past, he knows that Paulie showing up unannounced means things are not going well. Johnson added "If Paulie's in town, there has to be some sort of agenda. Angelo's waiting for the truth to come out." Angelo's suspicions that Paulie has an ulterior motive for coming to see him soon comes to fruition when Paulie reveals that he is in financial trouble. He asks for his brother's help, but due to their past Angelo is hesitant bail him out again. It later emerges that the reason for the brothers' bad relationship was an accident in which Paulie's set fire to their parents' restaurant. Angelo took the blame and was subsequently kicked out of the family business. Paulie took over the running of the business, but "bit off more than he could chew" and he believes Angelo is the only one who can help him. Angelo later lends Paulie a large sum of money to gamble at the races with. Charlie is "furious" with Angelo for lying to her and insists that they leave.

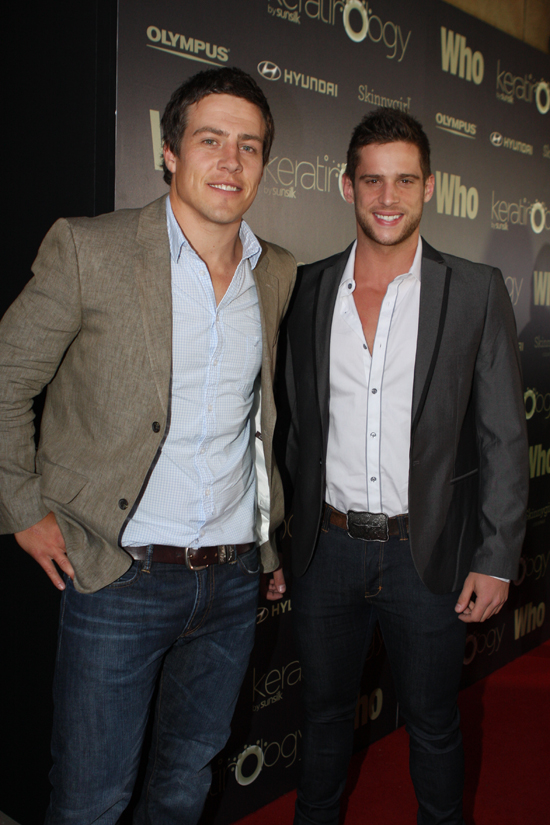
Steve Peacocke and Dan Ewing (pictured left to right) play Brax and Heath, Angelo's business partner and his brother, who attacks him.

=== Braxton brothers and attack ===
Angelo goes through a career change and opens his own Italian restaurant in the surf club. He soon goes into business with the newly arrived Darryl "Brax" Braxton (Steve Peacocke). When Liam Murphy (Axle Whitehead) tells Angelo that Brax's brother Heath Braxton (Dan Ewing) supplied him with drugs, Angelo "grows suspicious" and he later deduces that Brax and Heath are running a drugs operation. He follows Brax to a national park where he encounters "a vicious guard dog". Angelo later goes missing after trying to prove Brax and Heath are dealing drugs. Peacocke told an Inside Soap writer "Brax has warned Angelo to keep his nose of out of his business. But Angelo isn't intimidated, and when Brax says he needs to take care of something for a few days, Angelo thinks it's an opportunity to catch him and his brothers up to no good." Angelo finds Heath and his friends tending to a large drugs crop, so he calls Charlie and leaves a message telling her what is going on. Angelo is then hit over the head with a shovel, and Heath contacts Brax to tell him that he has "taken care" of Angelo. Meanwhile, Charlie finds the crop and Heath nearby, but no Angelo. Peacocke said there is suggestion of foul play, and added "Has Heath actually killed Angelo? It's not beyond the realms of possibility..."

Angelo is taken to the hospital by Brodie Upton (Guy Edmonds), where he remains in a coma. Brodie becomes the prime suspect in Angelo's attack and is arrested for assault, but the police need Angelo to wake up and give a statement. Peacocke said that his character really dislikes being brought into the situation, but as his brother is involved, Brax feels like "he's the one who has to clean up the mess." An Inside Soap columnist observed that there was a lot at stake when Angelo awakens, as Brax is also in a secret relationship with Charlie, who immediately goes to the hospital to question Angelo. Of what happens, Peacocke explained "Brax is worried that Angelo will spill the beans and implicate Heath as well as Brodie. However, Angelo actually lies and claims that he doesn't remember what happened." Following this, Brodie gets himself transferred to the hospital where he takes Nicole Franklin (Tessa James) hostage and tries to escape the Bay with Brax's help.

=== Departure ===
In February 2011, a writer for TV Week announced that Jacobz had left Home and Away. They said Jacobz would be seen on screen for a few more months, but the actor had finished filming. On his departure from the show, Jacobz said "I've thoroughly enjoyed playing Angelo. I've worked with some amazing people – and, as they say, when one door closes, another door opens. So I'm looking forward to what's next... here or abroad." The following month Jacobz revealed that it was not his decision to leave Home and Away and that the show's bosses decided to write his character out as they felt he had "nowhere else to go." Jacobz explained, "When they said the character was leaving I was upset, because I love working on the show. It was really that the character had reached all the different goals that the show wanted him to, and it worked out really well with storylines having the River Boys come in so that Angelo could go."

Jacobz later explained that just as his contract with Home and Away was ending, Seven asked him to host The X Factor. He recalled "I actually got called off set. I think Cameron Welsh was the EP of Home & Away and he said, 'You need to ring (programming boss) Tim Worner.' Next thing you know I was getting a photo shoot that day and the following Sunday we were on air." Jacobz admitted that he would have stayed with Home and Away, but the time needed to prepare for both shows would have been too much.

=== Return ===
On 15 February 2020, it was announced that Jacobz would return to the show after nine years off-screen. Of his return Jacobz stated "I'm so excited that my first scene back is with Ray Meagher who plays Alf Stewart! We all have so much to catch up on." A Home and Away publicist told Claire Crick from What's on TV that they were "thrilled" about Jacobz's return. They added that Angelo would be "back on the police force with everything to prove." Jacobz later explained that he was contacted by the show's producers in January. They asked him how he felt about his character returning to the Bay, and he said it was "very good". Jacobz began preparing for his return immediately with a new haircut and a wardrobe fitting. He said he would be on the show for "a good few months" and confirmed that Angelo was not coming back to be killed off. Jacobz filmed with the show for five weeks until production was temporarily shutdown due to the COVID-19 pandemic.

Angelo returns on 13 August 2020. He has since rejoined the police force and is now a detective. He returns to the Bay to investigate a murder. Jacobz said his character has "a lot of hunches, some things that he thinks he can follow up. But unfortunately a group of people try to put Angelo off the scent. Some of them try to protect each other, so it's not an open and shut case for Angelo. They don't make his job easy at all." Producers also cast Annabelle Stephenson as Angelo's wife Taylor Rosetta.

== Storylines ==
Angelo replaces Jack Holden at Yabbie Creek Police Station when he takes time off to deal with Martha MacKenzie's cancer diagnosis. He flirts with Charlie Buckton on an assignment and asks her out but she rejects him. He then turns his attention to Belle Taylor (Jessica Tovey) who refuses at first but only goes out with Angelo to make her boyfriend Aden Jefferies (Todd Lasance) jealous. When Belle is held hostage by Aden, Angelo rescues her. They form a friendship which develops into something more. The first test in the relationship is when Angelo is forced to arrest Belle when she protests at a development site but convinces Charlie to drop the charges. Belle later receives threats from the developers, which become a reality when Angelo is attacked. After Belle reunites with Aden, Angelo is incensed and loses his temper, trashing the beach house. That evening, Belle is attacked and Angelo is a suspect. He becomes a pariah in Summer Bay and turns to developer Tim Coleman (Kieran Darcy-Smith) for help. In exchange for clearing his name, Angelo switches the soil samples to get the investigation against the developers dropped. Belle's attacker Eric "Nobby" Nobbes (Mark Casamento) is arrested and Angelo pays his bail. Nobby is later killed in a confrontation with Tim and Angelo is warned to back off. Angelo then saves Belle's life when a gunman menaces them.

Angelo receives a phone call from Tim, who tells him to meet him at the site. Jack has a feeling that Angelo might know something about some alleged toxic waste around the site and follows him there. Jack arrives and Angelo calls out Tim's name several times, but receives no reply. While Jack watches Angelo from behind a tree, a shot is fired in Angelo's direction. Frightened, Angelo draws his revolver and hears a second shot which is even closer, and points his gun ahead. He hears a noise behind him, turns around and shoots twice, resulting in Jack being hit in the chest. Angelo hears Jack fall and thinks it is Tim but realises it is Jack and runs away in shock, leaving him dying at the site. He tries to cover up the killing but Charlie is suspicious and sets up a plan to catch Angelo out. At Jack's wake, Angelo is exposed by Martha when she tells Jack's father Tony, who lashes out Angelo but is restrained by several friends. Angelo confesses to killing Jack. He is then arrested and charged. However, he returns several months later under a special investigation into people smuggling as part of the Marine Area Command division of the police. His return upsets and angers Jack's friends and family. Angelo uncovers Jack's cousin Hugo Austin (Bernard Curry) is the mastermind behind the operation. Hugo refuses to admit anything and he is escorted to a city police station. Hugo is shot and Angelo fabricates a story to Hugo's family that Hugo is dead but in reality Hugo has made a deal. Angelo and Charlie are later promoted to sergeant and leading senior constable, respectively, which causes jealousy on Charlie's part as Angelo is now her superior. They later split and agree to be just friends.

Angelo then discovers Hugo is in hiding with Martha and Senior Detective Gordon Eaves (Lewis Fitz-Gerald) is a corrupt police officer bent on bringing Hugo down. Angelo and Charlie arrest Eaves. Angelo then arrests Hugo and Martha but lets them get away before they can be charged. As a result, Angelo is dismissed from the force and Charlie takes his position. He then starts his own restaurant, Angelo's, in the upper floor of the Surf Club. Angelo's younger brother Paulie Rosetta is mistaken as a food critic by Irene Roberts (Lynne McGranger) and Colleen Smart (Lyn Collingwood). It becomes clear that Angelo bears a grudge towards Paulie when he greets his brother with a frosty reception. It also annoys Angelo that everybody, including Charlie all seem taken by Paulie's outgoing nature and charming ways. The reason for Angelo's resentment is because Paulie inherited the family restaurants and Angelo had taken the blame for a fire when they were younger. It emerges Paulie is in some hot water with loan sharks and Angelo agrees to help him. Charlie tries to assist with some illegal money left by Hugo but Angelo refuses. He borrows $3,000 from the bank and tells Charlie the debt is paid. After finding out Angelo and Paulie have gambled the money, Charlie is angry and forces them to call their parents and they bail out Paulie. The brothers then mend their feud.

Angelo hosts a singles' night at the restaurant, which is gatecrashed by the River Boys. After they get drunk, they begin a brawl. Angelo goes into business with Darryl "Brax" Braxton, after Brax helps the restaurant make a profit. Angelo later becomes uneasy with his new partnership, especially when Brax changes the menu. Angelo becomes good friends with Nicole Franklin and he helps deliver her son, George. They then begin a relationship. When Angelo discovers a large marijuana crop being harvested in the forest, he calls Charlie to let her know, before being knocked out by Heath Braxton. Angelo is taken to the hospital where he remains unconscious. He wakes up and tells Charlie that he does not remember what happened, but when he warns Nicole, she realises that he does. Brodie Upton holds Nicole hostage and Angelo helps talk him down. Angelo discovers that Charlie is dating Brax and try to warn her about him. Angelo manages to blackmail Brax into buying him out of the business and he and Nicole leave Summer Bay with George. Angelo and Nicole later meet up with Marilyn Chambers (Emily Symons) in the city when she comes to visit George.

Angelo returns to Summer Bay nine years later, having rejoined the police force as a detective, to investigate the murder of Ross Nixon (Justin Rosniak). He questions and interviews Colby Thorne (Tim Franklin) about the day Ross took his sister Bella Nixon (Courtney Miller), his wife Chelsea Campbell (Ashleigh Brewer) and friend Willow Harris (Sarah Roberts) hostage. Angelo also asks Colby to tell Dean Thompson (Patrick O'Connor) that he wants to interview him too. Angelo later starts to suspect Colby, so Colby begins sleeping with his wife Taylor to gain access to the investigation and to throw Angelo off the scent, Angelo later finds out about the affair and attempts to get a confession by hiding a bug in a necklace he gives Taylor, he later arrests and charges Colby for Ross' murder and at the trial Angelo plays a recording of Colby confessing to killing Ross. Angelo later leaves town after reconciling with his wife.

== Reception ==
Jacobz received a nomination for the Logie Award for Most Popular Actor in 2010 for his portrayal of Angelo. In the same year, he was also nominated for Best Daytime Star at the Inside Soap Awards.

A writer for Holy Soap recalled Angelo's most memorable moment as being: "Shooting Jack Holden, of course!" A reporter for The Daily Telegraph branded Angelo "the most hated character on Home and Away", after he killed Jack. When the character returned to the Bay after the shooting, a critic for the Daily Record commented "Angelo swans back into the Bay as if nothing has happened. He may be ready to kiss and make up, but unfortunately, neither Martha nor Tony can forgive him for killing Jack." As he settled back in, the critic quipped "It was obvious there was never going to be a street party when Angelo Rosetta breezed back into Summer Bay. But the put-upon chap gets even more stick when he ends up arresting Irene."
