= Aidan Gillett =

Australian actor and stunt performer (born 1986)

- Born: 12 April 1986 (age 40); Blue Mountains, Australia
- Occupation: Actor
- Years active: 2007–present

Aidan Gillett (born 12 April 1986) is an Australian actor and stunt performer, who is best known for his roles as Daniel McManus in the BBC-commissioned soap opera Out of the Blue and Robert Cruze in Home and Away.

== Early life ==
Gillett was born and raised in the Blue Mountains region west of Sydney, Australia. In his early years, his main interests were music and sport, studying piano at the age of five, learning to play guitar at seven and focusing on jazz by the age of ten. He chose not to study drama at high school, instead continuing to focus on music and sport, particularly soccer and snowboarding.

In 2004, while working as a concierge and pursuing a Bachelor of Music, Gillett was encouraged by his manager to pursue an acting career. He subsequently trained at the National Institute of Dramatic Art in Sydney.

== Career ==
Gillett appeared in the Martin Crimp play Attempts on Her Life while studying at the National Institute of Dramatic Art late in 2007. After graduating from NIDA, Gillett appeared in Steven Spielberg's Australian production The Pacific.

In early 2008, it was announced that he had been cast in Out of the Blue, a BBC-commissioned soap opera, playing the role of Daniel McManus. The series premiered in the UK on BBC One on 28 April 2008 but was later moved to BBC Two after three weeks. The show ran for 130 episodes but is not expected to be commissioned for a second series following disappointing ratings. It started airing nightly in Australia on 17 November 2008 on Network Ten, before being moved to an earlier slot on Sunday evenings in January 2009. In 2009, Gillett started appearing in Home and Away, playing the guest role of Robert Cruze. In 2010, Gillett appearing in the first episode of Cops L.A.C. as Peter, the grieving partner. In 2014 Aidan began a transition into stunt work, grading with the MEAA in 2015. He has since performed in many feature films and television shows including Hacksaw Ridge, Cargo and Home & Away.

In 2024, Gillett appeared in Stan Australia drama Critical Incident.

== Filmography ==
Television appearances
Year	Title	Role	Notes
2024	Last King of the Cross	Tim Dolan	2 episodes
2024	Critical Incident	Rory Hooper	6 episodes
2023	NCIS: Sydney	Constable Scott	1 episode
2023	Year Of	Truck driver	1 episode
2022	Heartbreak High (2022 TV series)	Cop	2 episodes
2021	Born To Spy	Turmoil Agent	1 episode
2021	RFDS	Josh	1 episode
2020	The Secrets She Keeps	Plain Clothes Cop	1 episode
2020	Stateless	Cop	1 episode
2019	The Unlisted	Security Guard / Driver	3 episodes
2019	Les Norton	Wrongside	1 episode
2016-19	Secret City	ASIO Officer / Intruder	3 episodes
2018	Mr Inbetween	Passenger	1 episode
2018	Bite Club	Simon Keynes	1 episode
2009-17	Home and Away	Various	17 episodes
2017	Doctor Doctor	Dead passenger	1 episode
2011	Rescue: Special Ops	Scott	1 episode
2010	Cops LAC	Peter	1 episode
2008	Out of the Blue	Daniel McManus	76 episodes

=== Film appearances ===
Year	Title	Role	Notes
2020	2067	Protestor	
2018	Nekrotronic	Finnigan's Goon	
2015	River	Lachlan	
2013	Final Move	Silas	
2007	The Journal	Bne	Short

== Awards and recognition ==
Year	Award	Category	For	Result
2009	Inside Soap Awards	Best Bad Boy	Robert Cruze, Home and Away	Nominated
2017	Screen Actors Guild Award	Outstanding Action Performance by a Stunt Ensemble in a Motion Picture	Hacksaw Ridge	Won
