= Jodi Gordon =

Australian actress and model (born 1985)

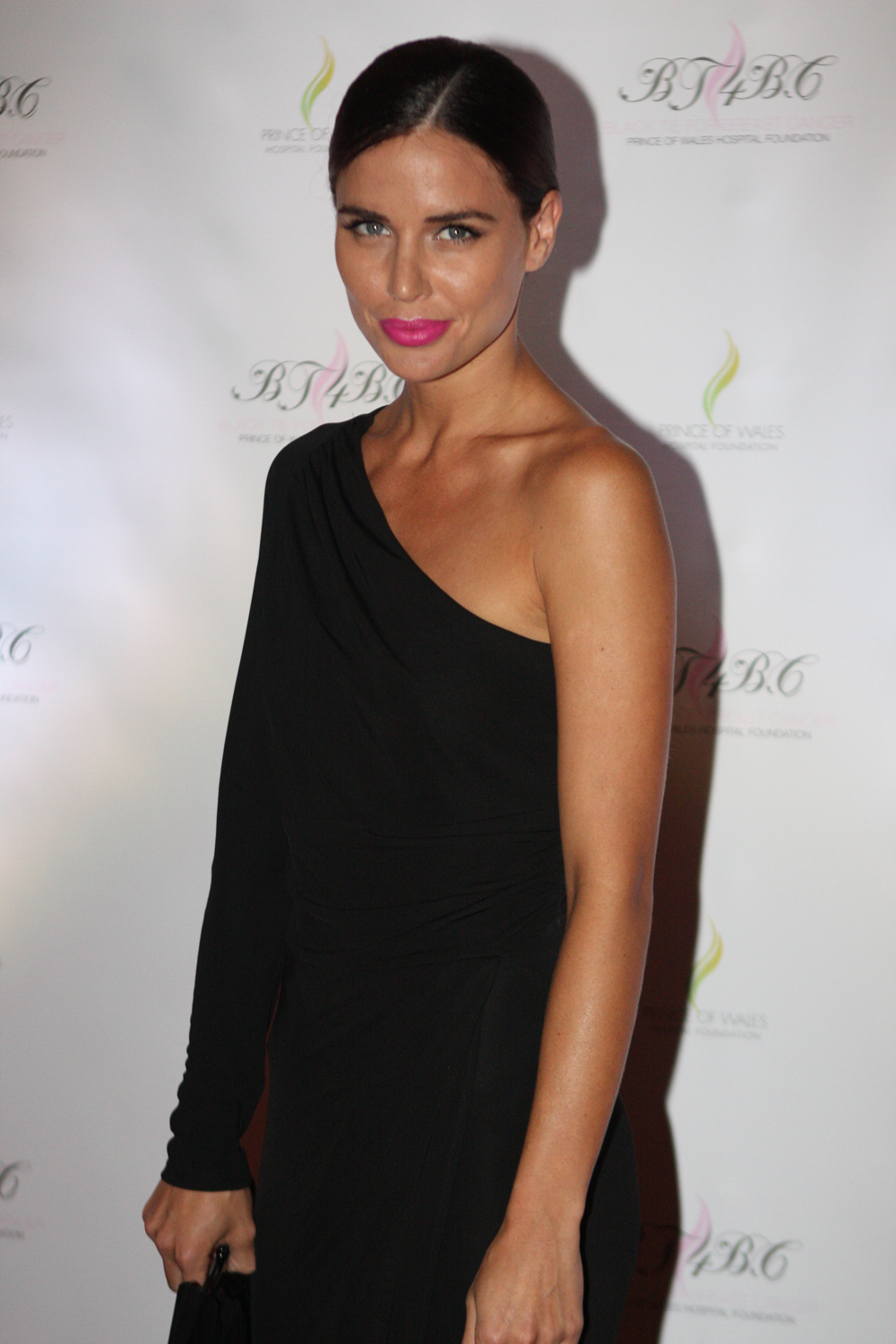
- Gordon at the Sydney Black Tie For Breast Cancer Gala Ball
- Born: Jodi Lee Gordon; 1 February 1985 (age 41); Mackay, Queensland, Australia
- Occupations: Actress, model
- Years active: 1993–present
- Spouse: Braith Anasta (m. 2012; div. 2017)
- Children: 1

Jodi Lee Gordon (previously Anasta; born 1 February 1985) is an Australian actress and model. From 2005 to 2010 she portrayed Martha MacKenzie in Home and Away. Gordon won the Logie Award for Most Popular New Female Talent in 2006. Gordon competed in the eighth season of Dancing with the Stars and made her debut feature film appearance in The Cup (2011). She has also appeared in Underbelly: Badness and Camp. From 2016 to 2023, Gordon played English teacher Elly Conway in Neighbours.

== Early life ==
Gordon was born on 1 February 1985 in Mackay to Bronwyn and Ray. She has an older brother, Ben. Her father was born in New Zealand and is a New Zealander of Māori descent and her mother is Australian. From the age of 8, Gordon's family moved to various locations along the coast from Mackay, eventually settling in Sydney when she was 11. She played netball from the age of 12 to 16.

== Career ==
=== Modelling ===
At the age of 13, Gordon won a modelling competition and gained a contract with Vivien's Modelling Agency. Her modelling led her to Japan, London and Milan, where she lived for five months. While modelling in London for two months, she took the opportunity to travel through Europe recreationally.

Gordon has been the official celebrity ambassador and model for Australian lingerie brand Crystelle, Shoe label Tony Bianco, and swimwear label 2Chillies. In 2013, she was announced as the new brand ambassador for Myer. In March 2017, she became an ambassador for car manufacturer Mazda's new CX-5 SUV. That same year, Gordon stepped down from her duties with Myer. In 2020, Gordon became an ambassador for skincare brand Esmi Skin Minerals.

=== Acting ===
In 2004, while preparing to move to New York, Gordon successfully auditioned for the role of Martha MacKenzie in the long-running Australian soap opera Home and Away. For her portrayal of Martha, Gordon won a Logie Award for Most Popular New Female Talent in 2006. The 2009 Logie Awards saw Gordon nominated for Most Popular Actress.

Gordon was a contestant on the eighth season of Dancing with the Stars. She and her partner, Stefano Oliveri, were eliminated in the fifth week, on 12 October 2008. In January 2010, it was announced that Gordon would be leaving Home and Away after almost five years. She filmed her final scenes at the end of February and they aired in June of that year. Upon leaving Home and Away, Gordon took acting lessons and attended auditions for many television shows including Cops L.A.C..

In May 2010, Gordon won her first film role in The Cup. The film, which was released in 2011, is based on Media Puzzle's win in the 2002 Melbourne Cup. Gordon plays the role of Damien Oliver's partner, Trish. In November 2010, Gordon returned to Melbourne to film her next project, Any Questions for Ben?, a Working Dog production. A writer for the Herald Sun reported that Gordon turned down an offer to appear in a ten episode reality show series documenting the lives of the wives and girlfriends of Australian sportsmen.

In February 2011, the actress returned to television in Network Nine's telemovie Blood Brothers, based on the Gilham family murders. Elle Halliwell of The Sunday Telegraph reported Gordon had been cast in the upcoming series of Underbelly titled Underbelly: Badness in April 2012. Gordon portrayed Kylie Keogh. In April 2016, it was announced that Gordon had been cast in the role of school teacher Elly Conway in Neighbours. She initially signed a three-year contract and made her first appearance in July. Gordon departed the serial in January 2020 in order to move back to Sydney, but she agreed to reprise the role for the serial's then final episodes in 2022. After Neighbours was picked up by Amazon Freevee, Gordon confirmed that she would be reprising her role for a guest appearance, which was filmed in May 2023.

In October 2021, Gordon joined the season 6 cast of The Celebrity Apprentice Australia, which aired in May 2022. She was the third celebrity to be fired by Alan Sugar.

== Personal life ==
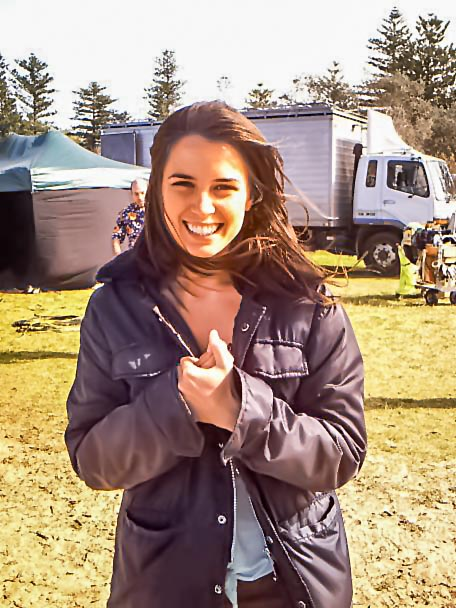
Gordon on the Home and Away set

On 4 March 2007, Gordon's boyfriend of two years, Chris Burkhardt, died from acute myeloid leukemia at the age of 23. In mid 2008, a storyline was introduced into Home and Away, in which Gordon's character was diagnosed with breast cancer. Gordon drew on her experience of Burkhardt's battle with leukaemia to take on the storyline.

In June 2009, Gordon was discovered by police cowering in a bedroom of a flat with Mark James Judge, an alleged biker gang member, during an armed response to an alleged attempted break in. No action was taken against Gordon or Judge for making a false report. It was further alleged by some media outlets that Gordon had disclosed to police that cocaine had been consumed on the day of the incident. Gordon later apologised for the distress the incident caused. In September 2009, Gordon made her first major public appearance since the incident at a parade for Crystelle lingerie. Following the incident, Gordon broke up with her partner, media heir Ryan Stokes.

Gordon sold her Potts Point apartment in January 2012 for $625,000 and she then moved to Clovelly.

Gordon became engaged to Sydney Roosters captain Braith Anasta in July 2011 and the couple married on 14 October 2012. On 25 August 2013, it was announced that Gordon and Anasta were expecting their first child together. Gordon gave birth to their daughter on 1 March 2014. Gordon and Anasta announced their separation on 11 December 2015, and their divorce was finalised in 2017. Gordon decided to keep her married surname, so it would be the same as her daughter's. In March 2020, she confirmed that she had reverted to her maiden name.

In April 2022, Gordon entered a rehab clinic in Sydney. Gordon and her former partner, Sebastian Blackler obtained AVOs against one another in Windsor Local Court the previous week, following a "physical altercation" that occurred at the beginning of the month. Gordon and Blackler were banned from communicating with each other for two years. In June, Gordon confirmed that she had had a years-long dependence on alcohol and was in "a really dark place" before she sought help and entered rehab for 30 days.

As of May 2023, Gordon is attending university full-time and studying counselling and communication skills.

== Filmography ==
=== Television ===
Year	Title	Role	Notes
2005–2010	Home and Away	Martha MacKenzie	Main cast
2008	Dancing with the Stars	Contestant	
2011	Blood Brothers	Sally Gilham	
2012	Underbelly: Badness	Kylie Keogh	Recurring role
2013	Camp	Kat	Recurring role
2015	Hiding	Dimity Krilich	
2016–2020, 2022–2023	Neighbours	Elly Conway	Main cast
2022	The Celebrity Apprentice Australia	Contestant	Season 6

=== Film ===
Year	Title	Role	Notes
2010	Suburbia	Tara	
2011	The Cup	Trish Oliver	
2012	Any Questions for Ben?	Kelly	

== Awards and nominations ==
Year	Award	Category	Nominated work	Result
2006	Logie Award	Most Popular New Female Talent	Home and Away	Won
2009	Logie Award	Most Popular Actress	Home and Away	Nominated
