= Jon Sivewright =

Australian actor (born 1965)

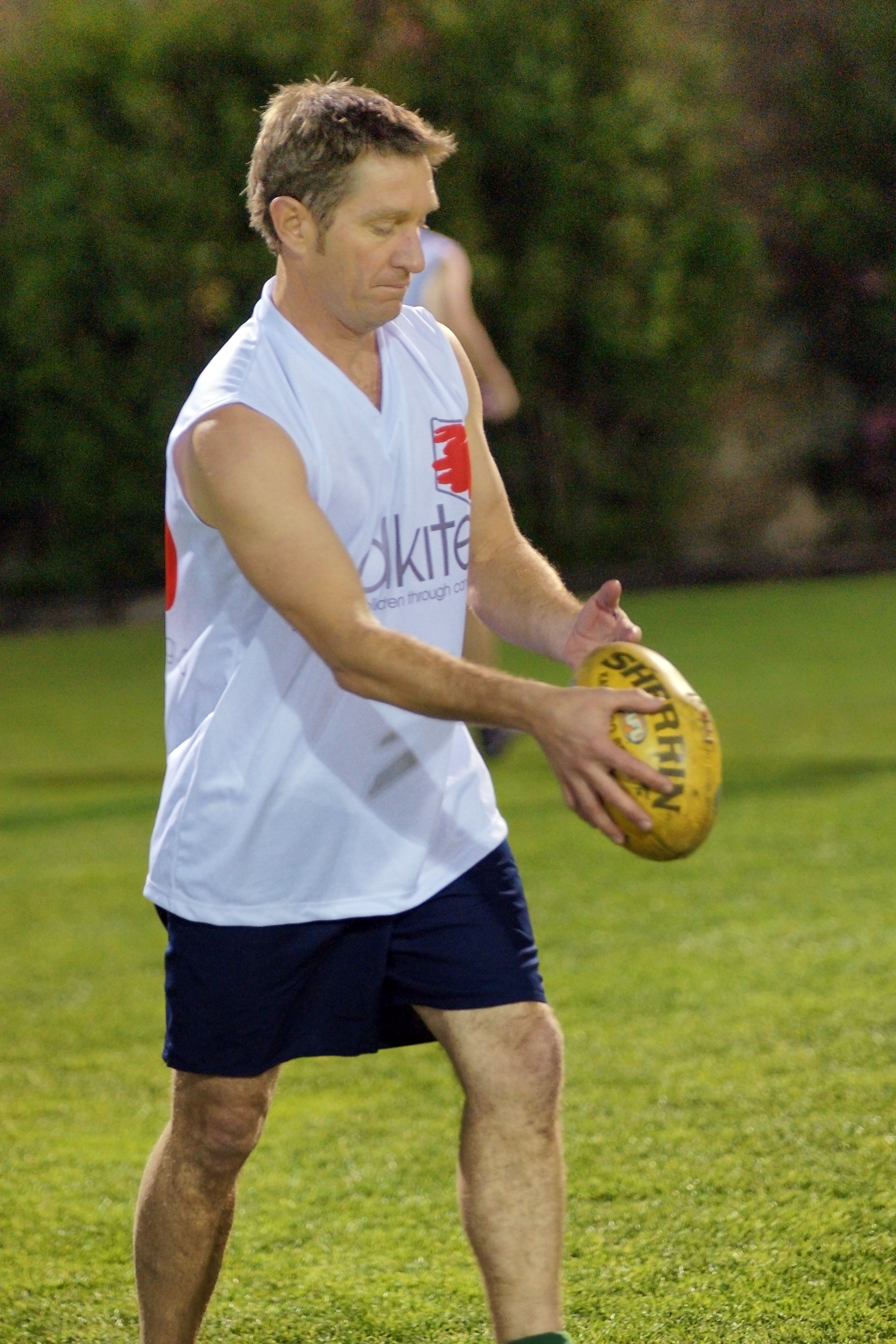
- Sivewright in 2008
- Born: 22 May 1965 (age 61); Fremantle, Western Australia, Australia
- Occupation: Actor
- Years active: 2003–present
- Spouse(s): Rachel Gordon (¿? - ?); Felicity Sivewright
- Children: 4

Jon Sivewright (born 22 May 1965) is an Australian actor. He is best known for portraying Tony Holden in Home and Away, a role he played from 2005 to 2010.

== Early life ==
Before becoming an actor he worked as a miner and spent 12 years as a fireman. He moved to live in Sydney in 2003 and was accepted into the Actors' Centre in Surry Hills, Sydney where he completed the two-and-a-half-year junior course. It was here that he first encountered Amy Mathews, his co-star and on-screen wife in Home and Away.

== Career ==
His first television acting job was playing Strike Team Firie in an episode of Fireflies entitled "Fighting Fire with Fire", which aired in 2004. He made a number of other minor television appearances in his early career.

In August 2005, Jon secured his first regular television role, playing Tony Holden in the long running Australian soap opera Home and Away. He played the father of Lucas Holden and Jack Holden. Upon arriving in the bay, he was romantically linked with Beth Hunter. But when Beth died, he paired up with Rachel Armstrong, a doctor. It was announced that he was leaving Home and Away in 2010 after a five year tenure.

== Filmography ==
=== Film ===
Year	Film	Role	Notes
2005	Little Fish	Footy fan	
2009	Scent	Michael	Short film, lead role
2009	Burden	James Cutler	Lead role
2011	Scent	Michael	Short film

=== Television ===
Year	Title	Role	Notes
2004	Fireflies	Strike Team Firie	Episode: "Fighting Fire with Fire"
2005	All Saints	Detective Harris	Episode: "Time Bomb"
2005–2010	Home and Away	Tony Holden	Series regular
2016	Cleverman	CA Checkpoint Guard	1 episode
2016	Brock	Mick Hone	1 episode
2019	Drop Dead Weird	Uncle Peter	1 episode
2023	Last King of the Cross	Barman	1 episode
2023	Ten Pound Poms	Keith Buddin	1 episode
