= Holy Soap =

British entertainment website

- Website type: Television, entertainment
- Available in: English
- Owner: Channel 5
- Website: http://holysoap.channel5.com/
- Registration: Free
- Launched: 25 June 2005
- Current status: Inactive

Holy Soap is a UK television and entertainment website founded in June 2009 by the British television company Channel 5. The website is the official UK home of the Australian soap operas Home and Away and Neighbours, which are broadcast on the channel. The site allows users to watch full episodes of the soaps on the day they are broadcast, as well as providing additional information about the cast and characters. Holy Soap also includes news and features from four British soap operas that are not broadcast on Channel 5. On 30 June 2011, Holy Soap announced that it was closing.

== Format ==
In June 2010, Channel 5 launched Holy Soap and it became the official UK website for the two Australian soap operas, Home and Away and Neighbours. Holy Soap replaced the programmes' stand-alone sites in the UK. The website allows viewers to watch full episodes of the soaps on the day they are broadcast, as well as previous episodes up to thirty days after they have aired. The site also includes news, gossip and video spoilers from British soap operas; EastEnders, Emmerdale, Coronation Street and Hollyoaks. Links to full episodes of the British soaps are also included. Images, cast and character profiles and exclusive interviews are available on the site for each of the soaps.

The site does not have any branding, so it attracts viewers who are interested in soaps on different channels. It was designed by Taglab and developed by Unboxed Consulting. Five Sales sell the video advertising around the episodes and previews of Home and Away and Neighbours, while digital media agency Unanimis, sell the display advertising on the site. Holy Soap forms part of Five's Digital Media Group platform, which also includes FiveFwd, a website aimed at fans of cars and gadgets.

On the launch of the site, Channel 5's head of digital media, Jonathan Lewis said: "We're not precious. We know that soap fans have voracious appetites and that many of the same people who love Neighbours and Home and Away love the soaps on the other channels, too. So it makes sense to construct a destination where individuals can share their love of all the big soaps on TV".

On 30 June 2011, Holy Soap announced that it was closing that day and the Australian soap operas, Neighbours and Home and Away, were being moved to a new online home at channel5.com.

== Reception ==
Gavin Reeder of Media Week reviewed the website and said that it "doesn't realise its potential" and that it "needs to have more personality and sense of humour". He added "There are some nice little snippets and gems about future storylines. However, it feels like it lacks the editorial investment required to become a portal for soap news and doesn't differentiate itself from the tabloids and TV mags with a range of video content or the immediacy that only online can deliver". Since its launch in 2009, between 25% and 30% of the traffic to the site is to the non-Five programmes. In December 2009, it was announced that Holy Soap, combined with FiveFwd and Five Casino, formed the "fastest growing group of websites among all major UK broadcasters".
