= Love Is the Great Rebellion =

Studio album by Ben Lee
- Released: 29 May 2015
- Genre: Pop
- Length: 53:16
- Label: Warner Bros.
- Producer: Ben Lee

Ben Lee chronology
Ayahuasca: Welcome to the Work (2013)	Love Is the Great Rebellion (2015)	Freedom, Love and The Recuperation of the Human Mind (2016)

Love Is the Great Rebellion is the tenth studio album by Australian singer Ben Lee. The recording was released in Australia in May 2015 and the rest of the world in June 2015. The album was distributed by Warner Music and was Lee's first release with Warner. Love Is the Great Rebellion marked a return to the pop sound of Ben Lee's previous work such as Awake Is the New Sleep and Ripe and was a change of direction from his previous release Ayahuasca: Welcome to the Work.

== Production ==
In an interview with The Guardian to promote Love Is the Great Rebellion Lee discussed this move from his more recent work.

"I thought it was going to be a natural progression from the Ayahuasca album," he said. "I thought it was going to be something very obtuse and abstract and meditative but suddenly these pop songs started coming out. [...] And as I started exploring, I realised I still feel some degree of unfinished business with what the pop song can do, creatively. I don't feel entirely tapped out of the medium."

== Critical reception ==
Love Is the Great Rebellion received generally positive reviews. Lee Zimmerman of PopMatters praised the album's cohesiveness, stating "...it holds together remarkably well as a unified, complete concept, a series of songs conveying like a zen-like mantra and philosophical thoughts on life, love, God and related subjects of similar consequence." Danelle Cloutier of Exclaim! recommended the album and also commended Lee's ability to explore deeper philosophical themes through pop music. Dan F. Stapleton of Rolling Stone Australia described listening to the album as pleasant but lamented that it lacked "grit". Stephen Thomas Erlewine of AllMusic gave the record a more mediocre review, stating that it is "...the kind of album that can double as motivation or pleasing background music for the office."

== Track listing ==
1. "Giving Up on Miracles" – 4:38
2. "Goodbye to Yesterday" – 4:14
3. "Forgiveness" – 3:25
4. "Big Love" – 3:12
5. "Happiness" – 3:13
6. "I'm Changing My Mind" – 5:07
7. "The Body of Love" – 4:29
8. "Everybody Dies" – 3:53
9. "Everything Is Ok" – 3:57
10. "Victory" – 3:11
11. "The Universe Inside" – 4:47
12. "Don't Let the Fire Die" – 5:03
13. "God Is a Fire" – 4:07

== Credits ==
The album was written by Ben Lee and produced by Brad Wood. Sally Seltmann and Jessica Chapnik Kahn also contributed as composers.
