= Gamble Everything for Love =

Single by Ben Lee

from the album Awake Is the New Sleep
- Released: 13 December 2004
- Recorded: 2004
- Genre: Pop
- Length: 3:21
- Label: Inertia Records
- Songwriter(s): Ben Lee
- Producer(s): Brad Wood

Ben Lee singles chronology
"Running with Scissors" (2003)	"Gamble Everything for Love" (2004)	"Catch My Disease" (2005)

"Gamble Everything for Love" is a pop song and also an EP by the Australian singer Ben Lee. It was released on 13 December 2004 by Ten Fingers. The song peaked at #39 on the ARIA Singles Chart in January 2005, spending 8 weeks in the top 50. The song was used in the popular series The Blacklist, in series 3 episode : The Director

It was ranked #15 on Triple J's Hottest 100 of 2004.

== Track listing ==
1. "Gamble Everything for Love"
2. "Ache for You"
3. "The Serious Mythology of the Yeah Yeah Yeahs" (non-album track)
4. "Desire" (non-album track)
5. "Hellbent for Heaven" (non-album track)

== Personnel ==
- Ben Lee
- Lara Meyerratken
- McGowan Southworth – guitar

=== Special guests ===
- Jason Schwartzman
- Har Mar Superstar
- Jenny Lewis
- Jason Falkner

== Charts ==
Chart (2004–05)	Peak position
Australia (ARIA)	39
