= Brad Wood =

American record producer

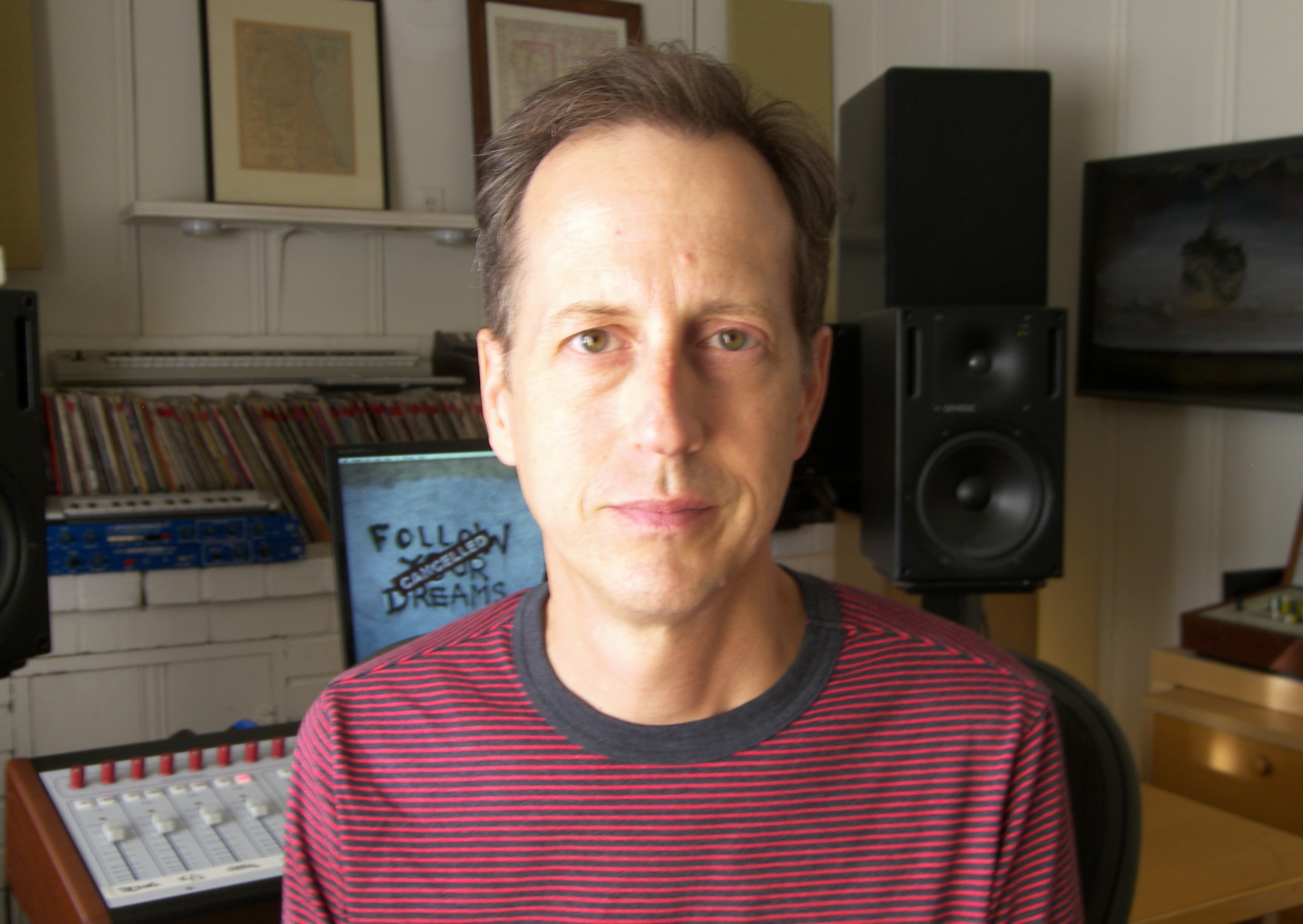
- Wood at Seagrass Studio

Background information
- Born: February 15, 1964 (age 62); Rockford, Illinois, U.S.
- Occupations: Record producer; audio engineer; musician
- Years active: 1988–present
- Formerly of: Shrimp Boat

Brad Wood is an American record producer and sound engineer based in Los Angeles. He has produced and engineered many albums in the rock subgenres of alternative rock and indie rock.

== Career ==
Wood is from Rockford, Illinois. In 1988, Wood, along with Brian Deck and Daniel Sonis, built Idful Music Corporation recording studio in Chicago's Wicker Park. While at Idful, he recorded and produced hundreds of records, including Liz Phair's Exile in Guyville, Veruca Salt's American Thighs, Ben Lee's Grandpaw Would, Sunny Day Real Estate's Diary and LP2, and albums by Red Red Meat, Seam, That Dog, and others. In addition to producing records, Brad was the drummer/soprano saxophonist for Shrimp Boat and touring drummer for Liz Phair (1993–94).

After relocating to Los Angeles, California, Wood has continued to record, mix, and produce records, primarily from his Seagrass Studio in Valley Village. He has worked on recordings by mewithoutYou, Touché Amoré, Skating Polly, Say Anything, Pete Yorn, and Dar Williams.

== Records produced or mixed ==
Album	Artist/Band	Year
Speckly	Shrimp Boat	1989
Roundhouse	Tar	1990
Hand	Tar	1990
Mungo	Snailboy	1990
Social Graces	Every Good Boy	1990
Dancing Under Water	Freakwater	1991
Duende	Shrimp Boat	1991
Construction Of New Action	Trenchmouth	1991
Miss Hell/My Spit	Calamity Jane	1991
Martha Jane Cannary	Calamity Jane	1991
Circus	Dog	1991
Jesus Built a Ship to Sing a Song To	Jeff Lescher and Janet Beveridge Bean	1992
The Lilacs Rise Above the Filth	The Lilacs	1992
Kernel	Seam	1992
Uptighty	Uptighty	1992
History Volume One	God and Texas	1992
Gladiator/Boilermaker	The Jesus Lizard	1992
Hollywood or Bust	The Mercury Players	1992
Hello Kitty	Hum	1992
Ernst and Son	Zoom	1992
Teetering	Tar	1992
Godawful	Big'n	1992
Jimmywine Majestic	Red Red Meat	1993
Cavale	Shrimp Boat	1993
Mosquito	Tortoise	1993
Clincher	Tar	1993
Torture	Mama Tick	1993
Criminal Element	God and Texas	1993
Inside the Future	Trenchmouth	1993
The Problem with Me	Seam	1993
Electra 2000	Hum	1993
Exile in Guyville	Liz Phair	1993
Spindrift	table	1993
Feels Like the Third Time	Freakwater	1993
Zoom	Zoom	1993
Double Shot	God and Texas	1994
Dreamcake	Jale	1994
Funny Farm	King Kong	1994
American Thighs	Veruca Salt	1994
Whip-Smart	Liz Phair	1994
Diary	Sunny Day Real Estate	1994
Jimmywine Majestic	Red Red Meat	1994
Memory Barge	Hardvark	1994
The Sea and Cake	The Sea and Cake	1994
Ursa Major	Eleventh Dream Day	1994
Trenchmouth Vs. The Light Of The Sun	Trenchmouth	1994
Are You Driving Me Crazy?	Seam	1995
Breathe	Loud Lucy	1995
Bunny Gets Paid	Red Red Meat	1995
Meet the Real You	Noise Addict	1995
LP2	Sunny Day Real Estate	1995
Menthol	Menthol	1995
Broadcaster	Triple Fast Action	1995
Grandpaw Would	Ben Lee	1995
Old Paint	Freakwater	1995
Rhythms, Resolutions & Clusters	Tortoise	1995
Placebo	Placebo	1996
So Wound	Jale	1996
Strand	The Spinanes	1996
Tin Cans with Strings to You	Far	1996
Kim Chee Is Cabbage	Number One Cup	1996
Hub	Hub Moore	1996
Multiple Attackers	Burnout	1996
Wrecked by Lions	Number One Cup	1997
All Disco Dance Must End in Broken Bones	Whale	1997
Something to Remember Me By	Ben Lee	1997
Promised Works	The For Carnation	1997
Retreat from the Sun	that dog.	1997
Singles, Live, Unreleased	Royal Trux	1997
Come Clean	Mysteries of Life	1998
Whitechocolatespaceegg	Liz Phair	1998
Adore	The Smashing Pumpkins	1998
Hedwig and the Angry Inch	(original cast recording)	1999
One	Diane Izzo	1999
White Out	Verbow	2000
Open Heart Surgery	Virginwool	2000
Musicforthemorningafter	Pete Yorn	2001
Closer	Better Than Ezra	2001
Vertigo	Jump, Little Children	2001
Transmatic	Transmatic	2001
Only If You Look Up	Portable	2002
Doll Revolution	The Bangles	2003
The Fire Theft	The Fire Theft	2003
Day I Forgot	Pete Yorn	2003
Welcome to the Middle	Laguardia	2003
Living Outside	Sense Field	2003
Catch for Us the Foxes	mewithoutYou	2004
Something Grand	Shrimp Boat	2004
Awake Is the New Sleep	Ben Lee	2005
Adapt or Die: Ten Years of Remixes	Everything But The Girl	2005
A Burn or a Shiver	Edison Glass	2006
Happiness & Disaster	Stabilo	2006
Desert Lights	Something for Kate	2006
About-Face	The Working Title	2006
Brother, Sister	mewithoutYou	2006
Shine	Sam Bettens	2007
In Defense of the Genre	Say Anything	2007
Attack	Dead Child	2008
Promised Land	Dar Williams	2008
Starting Gun	Signal Hill Transmission	2008
It's All Crazy! It's All False! It's All A Dream!	mewithoutYou	2009
I'll Wait for Sound	Director	2009
The Rebirth of Venus	Ben Lee	2009
Hell or High Water	As Cities Burn	2009
QU	Sherwood	2009
Let's Take a Walk	Long Live Logos	2009
Nearness	Lovelite	2010
Cho Dependent	Margaret Cho	2010
Deas Vail	Deas Vail	2011
Oh My Garden	Sophie Koh	2012
Ten Stories	mewithoutYou	2012
Is Survived By	Touché Amoré	2013
No Fairy Tale	Lisa Loeb	2013
The Things We Think We're Missing	Balance and Composure	2013
Summer 720	Bored Spies	2013
New Moodio	Eleventh Dream Day	2013
Hebrews	Say Anything	2014
The Blue Musk-Oxen	Olde Worlde	2014
Quiet World	Gatherers	2015
Love Is The Great Rebellion	Ben Lee	2015
The Silver Lake Chorus	The Silver Lake Chorus	2015
The Kraken	In Each Hand A Cutlass	2015
Ghost Notes	Veruca Salt	2015
Stage Four	Touché Amoré	2016
Kestrels	Kestrels	2016
Fat Lot Of Good	Cranky George	2016
Ties	SEE	2016
TOMGIRL	TOMGIRL	2016
Cinematica	Obedient Wives Club	2017
New Trick	Skating Polly	2017
Where I Go When I Am Sleeping	Casey	2018
Negative Space	Satellite Citi	2018
Untamed	WYO	2018
The Make It All Show	Skating Polly	2018
Fear Tactics	Satellite Citi	2021
My Colossal Truth	Night Dangers	2021
...Is Committed	Say Anything	2024
Sunn O)))	Sunn O)))	2026
Snowdrop	MONO	2026
