= Johnny Cooper (Home and Away) =

Fictional character from Home and Away

- Home and Away character
- Portrayed by: Callan Mulvey
- Duration: 2006–2008
- First appearance: 19 October 2006
- Last appearance: 7 March 2008
- Introduced by: Julie McGauran
In-universe information
- Brothers: Rocco Cooper

Johnny Cooper is a fictional character from the Australian soap opera Home and Away, played by Callan Mulvey. He made his first on-screen appearance on 19 October 2006.

== Character development ==
Johnny is characterised as being one of the show's "bad boy" roles. A Channel 5 reporter described Johnny as having the type of face people would dislike to "meet in a dark alley". As gang leader he commits many crimes such as robbery, blackmail and murder. His feuds with other characters result in him framing Brad Armstrong (Chris Sadrinna) with drugs and attempting to murder Sally Fletcher (Kate Ritchie) and Ric Dalby (Mark Furze). He also begins a feud with Sam Holden (Jessica Chapnik) when he starts blackmailing her. He orders Sam to help him enter the hospital so he can murder Sally, but she is reluctant. Johnny becomes violent towards Sam and threatens her son Rory Tolhurst (Jack Rickard). Sam eventually decides to resolve the predicament by hitting Johnny with a cricket bat. Her actions only hospitalise Johnny and she decides to administer a syringe of drugs to end his life.

In one storyline, Ric is wrongly convicted of murdering Johnny's brother Rocco Cooper (Ian Meadows). Ric is sent to the same prison as Johnny and he begins to target his fellow inmate. Writers focused on the two character's life in prison and had them share stories. Furze told an Inside Soap reporter that Johnny "wrangled" a transfer from another prison to get to Ric. When a drugs raid occurs in the prison, Ric notices that Johnny is guilty. Johnny and his gang plant glass in Ric's food as a warning. Furze added that Ric's only "salvation" from Johnny's vendetta is a prison officer, Guard Jones (Warwick Young). He asks Ric to help expose Johnny's drug dealing in the prison and he agrees to help in exchange for a prison transfer. Ric's scheme is unsuccessful, with Furze adding that "things don't exactly go to plan, and it all blows up in his face."

== Storylines ==
Johnny is first seen is his car outside Summer Bay High to warn his younger brother, Rocco that he has a commitment to his gang and cannot back out. Rocco's principal, Brad demands Johnny leave the premises and Johnny threatens him. Johnny then trashes Brad's flat and then forces Rocco into a robbery on Brad's place but Rocco convinces him to rob Amanda Vale's (Holly Brisley) home instead. Johnny and the gang take Amanda and Peter Baker (Nicholas Bishop) hostage and rob the place. Johnny then tells Rocco to ask Sally if he can move in at Summer Bay House but after Brad warns her about Rocco, she refuses. Johnny then has Rocco beaten and he is found by Brad and Sally agrees to let him stay. Johnny continues forcing Rocco to steal and escalates his feud with Brad and forces him off the road. Brad reports the incident but without proof, Johnny gets away with it. He then begins playing mind games with Brad by leaving messages about his late wife Emily (Libby Richmond) on the blackboards at school. Brad eventually snaps and attacks Johnny. Johnny in retaliation pays a student to claim Brad sold him drugs, which results in Brad being stood down as principal.

He then schemes to rob the local Credit Union, and Brad overhears and informs the police. However, Johnny is able to avoid arrest after a police search reveals nothing, due to Rocco removing the plans before the police arrived. Brad is hell bent on bringing Johnny down and sneaks back into his place and finds Amanda's stolen jewellery. Rocco then betrays Johnny to the police. Johnny tries to changes the plans but Sally finds the real plans and reports him to the police. Johnny is arrested and jailed. He demands Rocco either kills Sally or be killed himself. Rocco stabs Sally and leaves her for dead, but she survives. Sally remembers the stabbing and Rocco arranges for him to stay at a safe house. Ric Dalby (Mark Furze) arrives to confront Rocco but finds him badly beaten. Rocco dies in hospital and Ric is jailed for his murder.

Johnny begins making Ric's life very unpleasant when he is jailed. However, Ric's friends find evidence that exonerates him and he is released. In early 2008, Johnny escapes prison and returns to the bay in order to gain revenge on Ric and Sally. He poses as a chauffeur and hides out in the bush when the police begin looking for him. He makes his way to the caravan park and holds Colleen Smart (Lyn Collingwood) hostage with a knife and bursts into the house startling Miles Copeland (Josh Quong Tart) and Roman Harris (Conrad Coleby), leading to a tense standoff. Sally comes downstairs and tries to reason with Johnny but he stabs her and runs off into the night. The police give chase and Jack Holden (Paul O'Brien) shoots Johnny in his arm but he gets away. Johnny then hides out at the Holden family's home with the help of Jack's estranged wife, Sam, who he blackmails into helping him. He demands that Sam helps him get to Sally but when she lies about her still being in the hospital, he beats her up then takes Matilda Hunter (Indiana Evans) hostage and confronts Ric with a knife but is hit over the head by Sam with a cricket bat.

At the hospital, Johnny is left brain damaged but manages to utter the words "under the bed" to Jack, but before he can say any more, he goes into cardiac arrest. Sam later administers a morphine overdose and kills Johnny. Sam's guilt overwhelms her and she begins seeing visions of Johnny. A letter written by Johnny, exposing Sam's criminal dealings is found and Sam commits suicide as a result.

== Reception ==
For his portrayal of Johnny, Mulvey was nominated in the category of "Best Bad Boy" at the Inside Soap Awards in 2007 and 2008, respectively. A reporter from The Age said that the "flat-out nasty" role of Johnny suited Mulvey. Johnny was included in What's on TV's "The 50 most evil soap villains of all time" list. A reporter from Channel 5 included Johnny in their list of favourite Home and Away "bad boys". The character's murder disappointed a Daily Record critic who felt that Sam whacking Johnny with the cricket bat alone would have been "far more impressive". Other writers from the publication have branded the character a "sinister crook" and a "ruthless thug". An Inside Soap reporter branded Johnny a "crazy criminal". The character was voted the Best TV Villain in the 2008 TV Week readers poll. Mulvey told a writer for the publication: "That's unreal. I loved playing Johnny and I'm stoked people dug it. He really believed in his heart that the things he was fighting for were right."
