= Deeper into Dream =

Studio album by Ben Lee
- Released: 11 October 2011
- Genre: Indie pop
- Length: 44:31
- Labels: Dangerbird Records, Lojinx
- Producer: Ben Lee

Ben Lee chronology
The Rebirth of Venus (2009)	Deeper into Dream (2011)	Ayahuasca: Welcome to the Work (2013)

Deeper into Dream is the eighth studio album by Australian indie pop musician Ben Lee, released on 11 October 2011 through Lojinx in Europe and Dangerbird Records in the United States. It is the first concept album in his catalogue, with a central theme that focuses on the power of dreams. Joining Lee for this dozen-song set are his longtime musical collaborators Nic Johns, Lara Meyerratken, and Petra Haden, as well as mixer Noah Georgeson (The Strokes, Devendra Banhart, Joanna Newsom). While recording at his Laurel Canyon home studio, he also got a little help from his friends and family. For the last year, Lee has been recording and collecting their dreams, all of which are spliced into three dream collages.

== Track listing ==
All tracks are written by Ben Lee.

No.	Title	Length
1.	"My First Dream"	1:38
2.	"Deeper into Dream"	3:58
3.	"Lean into It"	3:22
4.	"Indian Myna"	2:34
5.	"Pointless Beauty"	4:31
6.	"When the Light Goes Out"	4:26
7.	"My Second Dream"	2:05
8.	"Glue"	3:56
9.	"The Church of Everybody Else"	4:10
10.	"I Want My Mind Back"	5:46
11.	"Get Used to It"	3:47
12.	"Dirty/My Third Dream"	4:17

== Reception ==
Reviews of the album have been generally mixed-to-favorable. Below are some quotes from articles on the release:

PasteMagazine.com - "For the first time in Lee's career, he seems less concerned about making singles and more focused on making a wholly cohesive album experience. With Deeper into Dream... it seems like he's looking for something more in his music, more variety and introspection. Lee produced the album himself, and it will definitely be a challenge for fans of Lee's airy, poppy sound. But, for those looking for more in his work, Deeper into Dream shows incredible growth in Lee and an exciting new direction to his usual style."

PopMatters.com - "What we get is an album that sounds unsure how fully it should commit itself to its concept... Lee never quite follows through on that initial pact he makes with the listener. Instead of wild dreamscapes, fantasies, nightmares, or even aspirations (which, of course, is a different sort of dream), Deeper into Dream mostly deals in straightforward indie pop-rock shorthand. Everything's inflected with the little smidgens of goofiness that Ben Lee's been mining for years, but the vibe of this album is more sleepy than dreamy." (Rating: 5/10)

NPR Music - "The new record is packed top to bottom with the language of dreams, but one element sums it up best. Peppered between the songs are testimonials: unnamed people describing moments from their own dreams, which fly by in rapid-fire montages... Deeper into Dream's concept is esoteric — and, Lee admits, perhaps not destined for broad commercial appeal. He says that suits him fine, especially now that he's a husband and father."

American Songwriter - "Marriage, fatherhood, L.A., and devotion to Sri Sakthi Narayani Amma may have mellowed the former Noise Addict leader, but Lee continues to release engaging, if slightly more introspective, work."

The Vine - "How about the songs? They're vintage Ben Lee, setting shaky vulnerability to indie pop confection that's got more depth than it initially lets on. For all the cuddly slightness of his delivery, these songs are lushly rendered and pool in stream-of-consciousness reflection that's more meaningful as a whole."

NoDepression.com - "Happily, Deeper into Dream is as vivid as it is visual, ten songs sandwiched by passages that find a seemingly random group of people offering detailed descriptions of their dreams. That's intriguing enough – most of these night time encounters are surely weirder than those experienced by the people who are hearing them – so not surprisingly, the songs maintain that same somnolent quality... And with many of the tracks melding together, the dream-like delirium is maintained throughout."

OurStage.com - "Making a dramatic shift in how you approach songwriting can be incredibly difficult, especially for those who've been set in one way for a long time. So, when you look at the case of Ben Lee, who's been making his mark in the music industry since he was fourteen, solo and in the band Noise Addict, it makes his latest output all the more impressive. With his recently released album Deeper into Dream, this indie pop mogul made serious adjustments and improvements in his craft to the delight of many music critics who panned his previous release The Rebirth of Venus."

BlagSound.com - "Ben Lee's new album pushes him into new musical territory; it is at times a fascinating, quirky but also frustrating listen. The album works as a sort concept album delving into the mysteries of dreams. The album as a whole is both angular and strange in its instrumentation yet always retaining its melodic base... for some [it] will be hard to get into upon first listen. It's not an overtly catchy album, and its unusual subject matter may put more tepid people off. Yet, if you stick with the album, its song writing and originality shines through, creating at the very least an album that should be talked about and puzzled over."

Snob's Music - "Despite the high concept the record is a bit of a disappointment. I love Ben Lee for the catchy hooks and clever turns-of-phrase that he employs. Those elements are just not present often enough for my liking on this new album." (Rating:6/10)

== Personnel ==
All songs by

- Ben Lee Pop Music / West Bay Music (ASCAP)
  Except "Lean Into", "Dirty" and "I Want My Mind Back" by Ben Lee (Ben Lee Pop Music/West Bay Music [ASCAP]) / Lara Meyerratken (APRA/AMCOS) / Nic Johns (BMI)

Musicians

- Ben Lee
- Nic Johns
- Lara Meyerratken
- Petra Haden
- Jon Titterington
- Ione Skye
- Kate Netta
- Goldie Priya Lee
- Noah Georgeson

Additional personnel

- Produced by Ben Lee
- Mixed by Noah Georgeson
- Engineered by Ben Lee, Nic Johns, Lara Meyerratken
- Mastered by Emily Lazar & Joe LaPorta at The Lodge
- Original artwork and photography by Lizzy Waronker
- Design and layout by Rory Wilson
