= Tecoma (musician) =

- Born: Amira Antonia M Pyliotis; 24 April 1980 (age 46); Melbourne, Victoria, Australia
- Origin: Alice Springs, Northern Territory, Australia
- Genres: Roots, jazz
- Occupation: Musician
- Instruments: Vocals, guitar, trumpet
- Years active: 1994–present
- Label: Polaris/MGM
- Website: tecomamusic.com

Amira Antonia M Pyliotis (born 24 April 1980) is an Australian independent Roots singer-songwriter and guitarist; who performs as Tecoma. Originally from Melbourne, in 2004, she relocated to Alice Springs, where the desert has given her much of her inspiration. Her style has been called "post trip-hop" by the Rolling Stone Australia (April 2007) and "alternative roots music" by Triple J radio network.

Tecoma is known for an eclectic mix of music, a distinctive voice, and a thoroughly engaging style when performing live. Since 2005 she has been touring nationally in Australia and internationally. Her most recent album has been receiving national airplay on Triple J and other Australian radio stations.

== Biography ==
Amira Antonia M Pyliotis was born on 24 April 1980, and grew up in Melbourne. Her mother, Saliha Mezaache, was born in 1945 in Algeria, and learned English in France; her father is Alexander "Alec" Pyliotis (born ca. 1943, Greece); her paternal grandfather, Dimitri Pyliotis (died 1 May 1975), was a Greek diplomat stationed in Canberra; and her paternal grandmother was Russian. Her oldest sister, Aryel, was born on 25 July 1976; a second sister was born on 15 March 1978. As a six-year-old Tecoma learned singing and dancing at a Johnny Young Talent School. In primary school, at about eight-years-old, she heard a jazz trumpeter "literally blowing us kids away with the power of the instrument and his skill on it. It was exhilarating!" While growing up she spent summers on the south coast of New South Wales.

Originally trained as a jazz and classical trumpet player, Pyliotis performed in various secondary school-based ensembles. Her early influences include Louis Armstrong, Nina Simone, John Lee Hooker, and Johnny Cash. While still at secondary school, at the age of 14, Pyliotis joined a covers band providing "Pearl Jam, RHCP & Faith No More" material. Upon completion of secondary education she entered a tertiary Bachelor of Music course; she studied "western and Arabic classical music". At the Australian Guild of Music and Jazz Theory she trained in classical singing, while at Melbourne Music Academy she studied guitar and composition.

By 2001 Pyliotis was on guitar, acoustic guitar and backing vocals, as a session and touring member of alternative pop artist Emaline Delapaix' backing band. They toured for six months a year both nationally and twice to North America and Europe. She features on two extended plays, The Reins (2001) and Slowdown (2002). Pyliotis and Delapaix co-wrote "Don't Say It", "Melting Down", and "Reins" for the band. Sophie Gurley of The Ectophiles' Guide to Good Music felt that "Reins", which appears on both EPs, was "abstract but yearning and deepens the emotional tone through strong shifts between vocals and strings".

During 2003 Pyliotis was on a working holiday in Alice Springs when she started writing tracks. Upon return to Melbourne she finished work on four tracks and recorded them independently with a studio band; she was assisted by Ben Wheeler as audio engineer and on drums. In 2004 she relocated to Alice Springs and started performing under the pseudonym, Tecoma. She further developed her style playing smaller, local places. While she has played with other musicians, she found one of her strengths was singing and playing guitar without other accompaniment, engaging the audience as an integral part of the performance. In November 2004 Tecoma performed at the FUSE Festival. Her track, "Fear of Heights", appeared on the Various Artists compilation album, Fuse Festival 2004 (2004).

In March 2005 she performed a Dylanesque rendition of ABBA's 1977 single, "Knowing Me, Knowing You" at the National Folk Festival in Canberra. On 9 May that year she released her four-track debut extended play, City Folk, on the Polaris Music label which was distributed by MGM Distribution. For the release Tecoma provided lead vocals, guitar, trumpet, programming and was its producer. It became "a favourite of community and alternative radio stations". Comparing Melbourne with Alice Springs, she reflected "[t]hese two places are tied up in me with associations of my past versus the future, chaos versus calm, built up inner city vistas versus sky that never ends" and hence provided the EP's title.

She toured Australia appearing at the 2005 Darwin Festival, and then Europe in September 2005, building up a fan base and earning wider recognition. At Berlin's Popkomm festival she performed as one of two Australian acts – the other was Ben Lee. Tecoma was also selected to appear at that year's Edinburgh Festival Fringe's The Famous Spiegeltent. In November her song "Fear of Heights", was the featured track of Ausmusic Month by national radio network, Triple J.

Early in 2006 she received a professional development award from Australian Performing Right Association (APRA) in the category Popular Contemporary to "further her career in the European market". The award increased her national exposure on Australian pop-oriented ratio stations. Also early that year she performed for the Swedish royal family and their entourage at an outback steakhouse in Alice Springs. She made her debut TV appearance in March. At the related APRA Music Awards ceremony in June, Tecoma performed "Catch My Disease", which won Song of the Year for its original performer, and co-composer, Ben Lee. Also that year she won a JB Seed Grant, which was sponsored by John Butler.

Early in 2007 she returned to Melbourne to finalise her debut album, Home Brew, which had tracks recorded in Alice Springs, Darwin, Melbourne and Sydney. She issued a single, "Air to Me", ahead of the album, in March and followed with a tour. The Dwarf website's Elyse Stoupe felt that her "voice sounds close to that of Missy Higgins, if only a tad bit raspier, making it that much more interesting. It's a quite a bouncy song, with a strong bass line and use of imaginative sound effects". In the following month Rolling Stone Australia described her style as "post trip-hop", and provided a give-away CD, Rolling Stone Supports JB Seed Artists, with tracks by Various Artists including "Air to Me" by Tecoma. She was interviewed by Michael Mackenzie for Radio National's Bush Telegraph and played her single, live.

During August–September she toured Australia promoting her album. Produced by Tecoma, it was released as Home Brew Side One in September, and included work by Wheeler and bass guitar by Lucas Taranto. Her tour continued until October. In March 2008 she performed, and ran a songwriting session, at the Womadelaide festival in Adelaide.

== Discography ==
=== Extended plays ===
- City Folk - Independent, Polaris Music/MGM Distribution (TEC001) (9 May 2005)

=== Singles ===
- "Air to Me" - Polaris Music (TEC002) (10 March 2007)
- "Home Brew Side One" - Polaris Music/MGM Distribution (TEC003) (17 September 2007)
