= Catch My Disease =

2005 single by Ben Lee

Single by Ben Lee

from the album Awake Is the New Sleep
- B-side: "Float On"; "No Right Angles" (live); "Something Borrowed, Something Blue" (live)
- Released: 18 January 2005
- Length: 4:14
- Label: Ten Fingers; Inertia
- Songwriters: Ben Lee; McGowan Southworth
- Producer: Brad Wood

Ben Lee singles chronology
"Gamble Everything for Love" (2004)	"Catch My Disease" (2005)	"Into the Dark" (2005)

Music video
- "Catch My Disease" on YouTube

"Catch My Disease" is a song by Australian singer Ben Lee. It was released as a single from his fifth studio album, Awake Is the New Sleep (2005), on 18 January 2005 in the United States and on 25 April in Australia. The song reached number 27 in Australia and came in second place on the Triple J Hottest 100 of 2005 poll. The song obtained international recognition when it appeared in the opening scene of an episode of the American drama series Grey's Anatomy and subsequently went on to appear as a track on the drama's original soundtrack.

== Awards and nominations ==
=== APRA Awards ===
The APRA Awards are presented annually from 1982 by the Australasian Performing Right Association (APRA). At the 2006 ceremony, Lee's winning song, "Catch My Disease", was performed by indie artist, Tecoma.

Year	Nominee / work	Award	Result
2006	"Catch My Disease" (Ben Lee, McGowan Southworth) – Ben Lee	Song of the Year	Won
2006	"Catch My Disease" (Ben Lee, McGowan Southworth) – Ben Lee	Most Performed Australian Work	Won

=== ARIA Music Awards ===
Year	Nominee / work	Award	Result
2005	"Catch My Disease" (Ben Lee, McGowan Southworth) – Ben Lee	Single of the Year	Won

== Track listing ==
Australian and New Zealand CD EP

1. "Catch My Disease"
2. "Float On"
3. "No Right Angles" (live at KEXP, Seattle)
4. "Something Borrowed, Something Blue" (live for KCRW's Morning Becomes Eclectic)
5. "Catch My Disease" (demo)
6. "Gamble Everything for Love" (video)

== Charts ==
Weekly chart performance for "Catch My Disease"
Chart (2005–2006)	Peak position
Australia (ARIA)	27
Canada AC (Billboard)	32
Canada CHR/Top 40 (Billboard)	18
Canada Hot AC (Billboard)	16
Netherlands (Single Top 100)	83
Quebec (ADISQ)	2
US Adult Alternative Airplay (Billboard)	18

== Certifications ==
Certifications for "Catch My Disease"
Region	Certification	Certified units/sales
New Zealand (RMNZ)	Gold	15,000^{‡}
^{‡} Sales+streaming figures based on certification alone.

== Release history ==
Release dates and formats for "Catch My Disease"
Region	Date	Format(s)	Label(s)	Ref.
United States	18 January 2005	Triple A; alternative radio	New West	
Australia	25 April 2005	CD	Ten Fingers; Inertia	
United States	16 October 2006	Hot adult contemporary radio	New West	
