= The Rebirth of Venus =

Studio album by Ben Lee
- Released: 6 February 2009
- Genre: Indie pop
- Labels: New West, Universal
- Producer: Brad Wood

Ben Lee chronology
Ripe (2007)	The Rebirth of Venus (2009)	Deeper into Dream (2011)

Singles from The Rebirth of Venus
- 1. "I Love Pop Music" Released: 20 December 2008

Professional ratings
Aggregate scores
Source	Rating
Metacritic	43/100
Review scores
Source	Rating
AllMusic	2/5 stars
Alternative Press	2/5 stars
The A.V. Club	D−
The New Zealand Herald	2/5 stars
Paste	7.3/10
PopMatters	6/10
Slant Magazine	1.5/5 stars
Spin	1.5/5 stars
Sputnikmusic	2.5/5
Uncut	1/5 stars

The Rebirth of Venus is the seventh studio album by Australian indie pop musician Ben Lee, released on 10 February 2009 by New West Records.

A portion of the proceedings attained from the record are to be donated to FINCA International's village banking program. A press release said FINCA "offers financial services, not charity, to the world's lowest-income women entrepreneurs. This creates jobs, builds assets and generally improves the standard of living in these destitute communities."

Critical response to the album has been largely negative, with particular mention of the song 'I'm a Woman, Too' (which Andrew P Street of Time Out Sydney described as reaching "a conclusion so baffling that it defies any criticism that isn't expressed via a crowbar to the jaw").

The album features Missy Higgins, Nic Johns, Cary Brothers, Patience Hodgson, John Alagia (Ripe producer) and Lara Meyerratken.

== Track listing ==
- All songs written by Ben Lee, except where noted.
1. "What's So Bad (About Feeling Good)" – 4:39
2. "Surrender" – 3:16
3. "Sing" – 3:15
4. "I Love Pop Music" – 3:35
5. "Rise Up" – 4:25
6. "Yoko Ono" – 3:42
7. "Boy with a Barbie" – 3:27
8. "Bad Poetry" (Lee, Carrick Moore Gerety) – 3:41
9. "Blue Denim" – 4:03
10. "Wake Up to America" (Lee, Jason Schwartzman) – 4:27
11. "I'm a Woman, Too" – 3:21
12. "Families Cheating at Board Games" – 5:42
13. "Song for the Divine Mother of the Universe" – 3:38

== Bonus CD (Limited 2CD version) ==
1. "New Wave" (originally by Against Me!)
2. "Rock Boys" (originally by The Grates)
3. "Ben Lee" (originally by The Ataris)
4. "Woman Is the Nigger of the World" (originally by John Lennon)
5. "Kids" (originally by MGMT)
6. "Throw Your Arms Around Me" (originally by Hunters and Collectors)

== Personnel ==
- John Alagia, Cary Brothers, Justin Carroll, Michael Chavez, Brian Conrad, Missy Higgins, Patience Hodgson, Laura Jansen, Melissa McCarty, Eric Robinson, Ione Skye, Maria Teresa Suarez, Olivia Asta Wood, Vanessa Wood: backing vocals
- Jack Graddis: guitars
- Nick Johns: acoustic, electric and bass guitars, autoharp, keyboards, piano, drums, percussion
- Ben Lee: electric and acoustic guitars, piano
- Travis Aaron McNabb: drums, percussion
- Lara Meyerratken: acoustic, electric and bass guitars, keyboards, piano, drums, percussion
- Jason Nesmith: slide guitar
- Kate Netto: percussion, backing vocals
- Ezra Reich: guitars
- Chick Wolverton: percussion
- Brad Wood: electric and synthesized bass, drums, percussion

== Production ==
- Produced and mixed by Brad Wood
- Recorded and engineered by Nick Johns (drums), Mike Terry (drums) and Brad Wood
- Mastered by Greg Calbi

== Charts ==
Chart (2009)	Peak position
Australian Albums (ARIA)	21
US Heatseekers Albums (Billboard)	47
