= White Lights =

EP by Deas Vail
- Released: August 26, 2008
- Genre: Indie rock
- Label: Brave New World
- Producer: Mark Lee Townsend

White Lights is the second EP by Deas Vail. It was released on August 26, 2008 under the Brave New World label and the last record released under the indie label. After money issues with B.N.W. Deas Vail had to unsign and their second full-length record Birds and Cages was released under Mono Vs Stereo.

== Tracks ==
1. Undercover
2. White Lights
3. Last Place
4. From Priests to Thieves
5. Balance
6. White Lights (Acoustic) [iTunes Bonus Track]
