= Noise Addict =

Australian musical group

- Origin: Sydney, New South Wales, Australia
- Genres: Alternative rock; indie pop
- Years active: 1993–1996, 2009
- Labels: Fellaheen/Shock; Ten Fingers
- Past members: Ben Lee; Doron Kalinko; Daniel Mapp; Josh Zoldan; Daniel Kohn; Joel Wasserman; Saul Smith; Romy Hoffman; Lou Barlow; Lara Meyerratken

Noise Addict (sometimes styled as Noiseaddict) was an Australian alternative rock band formed in 1993 by founding mainstay Ben Lee on lead vocals and guitar. He was joined in 1995 by Romy Hoffman on guitar before the group disbanded early in 1996. They had issued a studio album, Meet the Real You, on Fellaheen Records/Shock Records in late 1995. Lee undertook a solo career. He briefly reconvened Noise Addict in 2009 with new members, Lou Barlow and Lara Meyerratken, to issue a second album, It Was Never About the Audience (1 September 2009), before returning to his solo pursuits.

== History ==
Noise Addict were formed in Bondi Beach in early 1993, with the original line-up of Ben Lee on lead vocals and guitar, Doron Kalinko on bass guitar and Josh Zoldan on drums. All were school mates at Moriah College in Sydney's eastern suburbs. Other early bandmates include Daniel Mapp on bass guitar and Joel Wasserman on drums. Lee was later joined by Daniel Kohn on bass guitar and Saul Smith on drums.

The band recorded a four-track demo in Lee's bedroom and sent copies to various record labels. The members’ average age was 14. Their first gig was at a library book sale in 1993. Attending that gig was Steve Pavlovic of Fellaheen Records, who signed them and sent their tape to Thurston Moore of Sonic Youth. Sonic Youth were then touring Australia and Noise Addict's second gig on 6 February 1993 at Selina's Nightclub, was supporting them. Moore signed them to his Ecstatic Peace record label, and the DEF extended play was released in early 1993 – recorded by the line-up of Lee, Kalinko and Zoldan.

According to Australian musicologist, Ian McFarlane, there are "some parallels to be drawn with another teenage band", silverchair, "although Lee preferred to see Noise Addict as infinitely more 'punk rock'." Their single, "I Wish I Was Him" (October 1993), was "a wry semi-acoustic ode to Lemonheads'" leader, Evan Dando. It attracted the attention of Mike D from the Beastie Boys, who arranged for the band to sign with their label, Grand Royal. They supported two more US bands, Pavement and Fugazi, and then played a run of all-ages gigs.

Noise Addict released their second EP, The Taste in My Eyes (April 1994); The line-up was Lee, Kalinko (who had moved from bass to lead guitar), Kohn and Wasserman. McFarlane felt the EP "displayed plenty of low-fi charm and youthful exuberance among the stylised Jonathan Richmanesque songs." They followed with another EP on Fellaheen, Noise Addict vs. Silverchair. They issued Young and Jaded in 1994 on the Grand Royal label; it included "six acoustic songs again recorded [in] Ben Lee's bedroom." Due to school commitments touring by the band was limited.

After the success of Young and Jaded, Lee released his solo debut, Grandpaw Would (June 1995). Kalinko was replaced by Romy Hoffman on lead guitar. In late 1995, Noise Addict released their only full-length album, Meet the Real You, which was produced by Brad Wood (Sebadoh, Liz Phair).

They briefly toured with Sebadoh. In November 1995, the band contributed the track "Mouthwash" to the AIDS benefit album Red Hot + Bothered, for the Red Hot Organization. They performed the last gig in early 1996 in Bondi. McFarlane noticed that "In true punk rock style, as soon as the album came out, Lee broke up the band." Ben Lee continued as a solo artist, he released several albums. Daniel Mapp played with Waikiki. Romy Hoffman performed hip-hop as MC Macromantics.

On 1 September 2009, a new incarnation of Noise Addict, with Lee joined by Lou Barlow (of Dinosaur Jr) and Lara Meyerratken (aka El May), released their second album, It Was Never About the Audience on Lee's own label, Ten Fingers Records. After the Show's reviewer described it as "lo-fi album is a great antidote to slick, overproduced records that value Protools over talent." A two-LP compilation of the band's initial discography, 10,000 Kids with Guitars, was released on Record Store Day 2017 via Numero Group.

== Discography ==
=== Albums ===
- Meet the Real You (late 1995)
- It Was Never About the Audience (1 September 2009) Ten Fingers Records

=== Extended plays ===
- DEF (early 1993) Ecstatic Peace
- The Taste in My Eyes (aka Noise Addict vs. Silverchair) (April 1994) Fellaheen Records
- Young and Jaded (1994) Grand Royal

=== Singles ===
- I Wish I Was Him (aka "Unplugged") (October 1993) Fellaheen Records
- The Frail Girl (1995) Grand Royal / Fellaheen Records

=== Compilations ===
- 10,000 Kids With Guitars (2LP, April 2017) Numero Group
