= Breathing Tornados =

Studio album by Ben Lee
- Released: 16 November 1998
- Genre: Indie pop
- Length: 43:47
- Label: Modular Recordings
- Producer: Ed Buller

Ben Lee chronology
Something to Remember Me By (1997)	Breathing Tornados (1998)	Hey You. Yes You. (2002)

Singles from Breathing Tornados
- 1. "Cigarettes Will Kill You" Released: 1998; 2. "Nothing Much Happens" Released: 1999

Professional ratings
Review scores
Source	Rating
AllMusic	4/5 stars
CMJ New Music Report	favorable
Melody Maker	4.5/5 stars
The New Rolling Stone Album Guide	2.5/5 stars

Breathing Tornados is the third studio album by Australian musician Ben Lee, released on 16 November 1998, through Modular Recordings. It peaked at number 13 on the ARIA Albums Chart.

== Critical reception ==
Wendy Mitchell of CMJ New Music Report said, "The adventurous Breathing Tornados proves Lee capable of experimenting with new forms of expression, without abandoning the hooky pop and acoustic folk of his previous work." She said, "In addition to Lee's guitar work, Breathing Tornados unexpectedly offers machine-made beats, keyboards, horns and assorted weird samples."

== Track listing ==
No.	Title	Length
1.	"Cigarettes Will Kill You"	3:50
2.	"Nothing Much Happens"	3:37
3.	"I Am a Sunflower"	3:56
4.	"Tornados"	3:21
5.	"The Finger and the Moon"	3:42
6.	"Birthday Song"	4:27
7.	"Nighttime"	3:30
8.	"Burn to Shine"	3:50
9.	"Sandpaperback"	3:45
10.	"10ft. Tall" (credited as "Ten Feet Tall" on Australian edition)	2:20
11.	"Ship My Body Home"	3:44
12.	"Sleepwalking"	3:45

== Personnel ==
Credits adapted from liner notes.

- Ben Lee – vocals, guitars, bass, percussion
- Ed Buller – keyboards, programming, percussion, production
- Scott Donnel – drums (on "Nothing Much Happens" and "The Finger and the Moon")
- Harmony Korine – monologue (on "Nothing Much Happens")
- Petra Haden – backing vocals (on "Nighttime")
- Donovan Leitch – falsetto vocals (on "Nighttime")
- Sean Lennon – backing vocals (on "Sandpaperback")

== Charts ==
=== Weekly charts ===
Chart (1998–1999)	Peak position
Australian Albums (ARIA)	13

=== Year-end charts ===
Chart (1999)	Position
Australian Albums (ARIA)	62

== Certifications ==
Region	Certification	Certified units/sales
Australia (ARIA)	Gold	35,000^{^}
^{^} Shipments figures based on certification alone.
