= Cigarettes Will Kill You =

1999 single by Ben Lee

Single by Ben Lee

from the album Breathing Tornados
- B-side: "Girls Talk"; "You're Gonna Make Me Lonesome When You Go"
- Released: 8 March 1999
- Length: 3:48
- Label: Modular
- Songwriter: Ben Lee
- Producer: Ed Buller

Ben Lee singles chronology
"Career Choice" (1997)	"Cigarettes Will Kill You" (1999)	"Ship My Body Home" (1998)

"Cigarettes Will Kill You" is a song by Australian singer-songwriter Ben Lee from his third studio album, Breathing Tornados (1998). Produced by Ed Buller, the song became a breakout success for Lee. It was voted number two on the 1998 Triple J Hottest 100 and reached number 46 on the Australian Singles Chart in 1999. In 2025, the song placed 83 on the Triple J's Hottest 100 of Australian Songs.

The song was featured in the 2002 Australian comedy Crackerjack. It has also been referenced in the Axis of Awesome's song medley "Four Chord Song", a reference to the fact that the chord progression in "Cigarettes Will Kill You" is similar to that of Journey's "Don't Stop Believin'" and Toto's "Africa".

== Background ==
During his 24 April 2006 concert at Irving Plaza in New York City, Lee described how he came up with the title for the track, recalling that he'd been listening to the Verve's "The Drugs Don't Work" and was so impressed with its title that he decided to name his own song with a similarly catchy title.

The title of "Cigarettes Will Kill You" as well as many of the lyrics refer to cigarette smoking as a metaphor for continuing to go back to a bad relationship even though one knows it will end terribly and cause pain. Lee recounted how one often badly needs short-term comfort to get through an otherwise sad, frustrating life even though everyone knows that smoking can cause health problems. The single's cover even resembles a pack of cigarettes.

In August 2021, Lee confirmed on his official TikTok account that the lyric "I want a TV embrace" was a mondegreen based on a misheard Fiona Apple lyric. In Apple's song "Sleep to Dream", Lee had thought Apple had sung "This mind this body and this voice cannot be stifled by your TV embrace"—the real lyric being "This mind this body and this voice cannot be stifled by your deviant ways". It was years later Lee realised his mistake but still used the lyric anyway.

== Track listings ==
All songs were written by Ben Lee unless otherwise stated.

Australian CD single

1. "Cigarettes Will Kill You" – 3:50
2. "Girls Talk" (Elvis Costello) – 2:35
3. "You're Gonna Make Me Lonesome When You Go" (Bob Dylan) – 3:16

UK CD single

1. "Cigarettes Will Kill You" – 3:48
2. "Girls Talk" (Costello) – 2:37
3. "How to Survive a Broken Heart" – 2:49

UK 7-inch single

A. "Cigarettes Will Kill You" – 3:48
B. "Girls Talk" (Costello) – 2:37

== Charts ==
Chart (1999)	Peak position
Australia (ARIA)	46
Scottish Singles Sales (Official Charts)	97
UK Singles (Official Charts)	92
UK Independent (Official Charts)	21

== Release history ==
Region	Date	Format(s)	Label(s)	Ref.
Australia	8 March 1999	CD	Modular	
United Kingdom	29 March 1999	7-inch vinyl; CD	Grand Royal	
United States	12 October 1999	Alternative radio	Grand Royal	

== See also ==
- "Four Chord Song"
