= Open Heart Surgery =

Studio album by Virginwool
- Released: August 8, 2000
- Studio: Pachyderm (Cannon Falls, Minnesota)
- Label: Atlantic
- Producer: Brad Wood

Professional ratings
Review scores
Source	Rating
AllMusic	4/5 stars

Open Heart Surgery is an album by the rock band Virginwool, released in 2000 via Breaking/Atlantic Records. The album is out of print.

"I Think Her Mother Loves Me" was the first single from the album; a remixed, slightly poppier version was released. "Better for You" was the second single, and it too was released in a shorter radio edit.

== Production ==
The album was produced by Brad Wood. It was recorded at Pachyderm Recording Studio, in Cannon Falls, Minnesota.

The tracks "You're the Girl" and "Picked Apart" were previously released on the band's self-released CDs, when they were known as Gumwrapper Curb. "Picked Apart" was originally titled "Virgin Wool".

== Critical reception ==
The New York Post wrote that the band "indulges in the same king of quirky rock the propelled Tom Petty and his Heartbreakers to the top." CMJ New Music Monthly wrote that singer Jordan Pouzzner "wraps his sensitive-guy pipes around heart-tugging hooks and stadium-sized choruses." The Post and Courier called the songs "captivating and quirky," and praised the "rich harmonies and chiming guitars." The Tallahassee Democrat called Open Heart Surgery "a sizzling slab of wry, melodic pop-rock."

== Track listing ==
1. "Nevermind Her Hips"
2. "I Think Her Mother Loves Me"
3. "You're the Girl"
4. "Climbing Boulders"
5. "Better for You"
6. "Lonely Man"
7. "Timeframe"
8. "Goodman Vibe"
9. "Angel"
10. "Picked Apart"
11. "New Song"
12. "Between the Lies"

== Personnel ==
- Jordan Pouzzner – vocals
- Gar Willard – guitars
- Adam Loewy – bass
- Brett Crook – drums, percussion
