= Something to Remember Me By =

Studio album by Ben Lee
- Released: 20 May 1997
- Genre: Indie pop
- Label: Fellaheen (Australia); Grand Royal (USA)
- Producer: Brad Wood

Ben Lee chronology
| Grandpaw Would (1995) | Something to Remember Me By (1997) | Breathing Tornados (1998) |

Professional ratings
Review scores
| Source | Rating |
|---|---|
| AllMusic | 4/5 stars |
| Chicago Tribune | 2/4 stars |
| The Encyclopedia of Popular Music | 3/5 stars |
| Entertainment Weekly | B |
| The New Rolling Stone Album Guide | 2.5/5 stars |
| Spin | 7/10 |
| The Sydney Morning Herald | 4/5 stars |

Something to Remember Me By is the second album by Australian indie pop artist Ben Lee. It was released in 1997.

== Critical reception ==
The Chicago Tribune wrote that "Lee's gift for pop melodies is still on display, especially on the country-tinged 'New Song,' but he has yet to learn that every disappointment does not contain the makings of a great song." Tulsa World wrote that Lee's "strumming of acoustic guitars and modest voice sound like John Wesley Harding without the political agenda."

== Track listing ==
Australia

1. "How to Survive a Broken Heart" (Lee, Richman) – 2:49
2. "Deep Talk in the Shallow End" (Lee) – 2:46
3. "New Song" (Lee) – 3:54
4. "Eight Years Old" (Lee) – 3:45
5. "Career Choice" (Lee) – 3:56
6. "Ketchum" (Lee) – 4:52
7. "Daisy" (Lee) – 5:34
8. "My Drifting Nature" (Lee) – 2:39
9. "2 Sisters" (Lee) – 4:50
10. "A Month Today" (Lee) – 1:28
11. "Household Name" (Lee) – 3:23
12. "Grammercy Park Hotel" (Lee) – 5:41
13. "End of the World" (Lee, Kent) – 3:11
14. "Long Train Ride" (Lee) – 3:40

Japan

1. "How to Survive a Broken Heart"
2. "Deep Talk in the Shallow End"
3. "In the Desert"
4. "New Song"
5. "8 Years Old"
6. "Career Choice"
7. "Ketchum"
8. "Daisy"
9. "My Drifting Nature"
10. "2 Sisters"
11. "A Month Today"
12. "Bad Radio Voice"
13. "Household Name"
14. "Grammercy Park Hotel"
15. "End of the World"
16. "Long Train Ride"
17. "Sally's Orchid"
18. "End of an Era"

== Singles ==
No singles were released from this album, apart from a promo release of "Career Choice."
