= The Make It All Show =

Studio album by Skating Polly
- Released: May 4, 2018
- Genres: Punk rock; indie pop
- Length: 42:21
- Label: El Camino
- Producer: Brad Wood

Skating Polly chronology
New Trick (2017)	The Make It All Show (2018)	Chaos County Line (2023)

Singles from The Make It All Show
- 1. "Queen for a Day" Released: February 27, 2018; 2. "Camelot" Released: March 28, 2018; 3. "Hollywood Factory" Released: April 27, 2018

Professional ratings
Review scores
Source	Rating
AllMusic	3.5/5 stars
Drowned in Sound	9/10 stars
Louder Than War	Positive

The Make It All Show is the fifth studio album by Skating Polly. It was released on March 4, 2018. It is the first album with drummer Kurtis Mayo. Brad Wood produced the album.

== Composition ==
The lyrics to "Queen for a Day", the album's first single, were co-written by Exene Cervenka, who produced the band's second album, Lost Wonderfuls, which was released in 2013.

== Track listing ==
All tracks are written by Peyton Bighorse, Kelli Mayo, and Kurtis Mayo, except "Queen for a Day" (Bighorse, Kelli Mayo, Kurtis Mayo, Exene Cervenka), "Beautiful Stranger" (Madonna, William Orbit), and "Mostly Glad" (Bighorse, Kelli Mayo).

No.	Title	Length
1.	"Classless Act"	3:32
2.	"Little Girl Blue and the Battle Envy"	6:05
3.	"Free Will at Ease"	2:58
4.	"Queen for a Day" (featuring Exene Cervenka)	2:55
5.	"They're Cheap (I'm Free)"	3:43
6.	"Long Ride"	3:52
7.	"Camelot"	3:28
8.	"Hollywood Factory"	2:55
9.	"This Vacation"	3:53
10.	"Flatwound Strings"	4:38
11.	"Don't Leave Me Gravity"	4:00
Total length:		42:21

=== B-Sides ===
- "Beautiful Stranger" (Madonna cover) – 3:24
- "Mostly Glad" – 2:48

== Personnel ==
Skating Polly

- Kelli Mayo – lead vocals (all tracks except "Free Will at Ease," Long Ride," and "Don't Leave Me Gravity"), bass (all tracks except "Camelot," Flatwound Strings," "Don't Leave Me Gravity," and "Mostly Glad"), guitar (on "Camelot" and "Flatwound Strings"), piano (on "Don't Leave Me Gravity"), backing vocals
- Peyton Bighorse – guitar (all tracks except "Camelot" and "Flatwound Strings"), lead vocals (on "Free Will at Ease," "Long Ride," and "Don't Leave Me Gravity"), co-lead vocals (on "Classless Act"), bass (on "Camelot" and "Flatwound Strings"), drums (on "They're Cheap, (I'm Free)"), backing vocals
- Kurtis Mayo – drums (all tracks except "They're Cheap (I'm Free)" and "Mostly Glad"), guitar (on "They're Cheap (I'm Free)")

Additional musicians

- Brad Wood – production, percussion
- Exene Cervenka – backing vocals on "Queen for a Day"
- Chick Wolverton – additional guitar on "Camelot," backing vocals on "This Vacation"

Other personnel

- Hans DeKline – mastering
