= Awake Is the New Sleep =

Studio album by Ben Lee
- Released: 22 February 2005
- Recorded: March−November 2004
- Studios: Seagrass Studio; Valley Village, Los Angeles, California, United States
- Genre: Indie pop
- Length: 56:54
- Labels: New West Records (USA); Inertia Distribution (Australia)
- Producer: Brad Wood

Ben Lee chronology
hey you. yes you. (2002)	Awake Is the New Sleep (2005)	Ripe (2007)

Singles from Awake Is the New Sleep
- 1. "Gamble Everything for Love" Released: December 2004; 2. "Catch My Disease" Released: April 2005; 3. "Into the Dark" Released: October 2005; 4. "We're All in This Together" Released: April 2006

Professional ratings
Aggregate scores
Source	Rating
Metacritic	57/100
Review scores
Source	Rating
AllMusic	4/5 stars
Alternative Press	4/5 stars
E!	B−
Entertainment Weekly	B
DIY	3.5/5 stars
Drowned in Sound	7/10
Filter	80%
Paste	4/5 stars
Pitchfork	2.9/10
Rolling Stone	2/5 stars

Awake Is the New Sleep is the fifth album by Australian musician Ben Lee, released in 2005. It reached #5 on the Australian ARIA Albums Chart, becoming his most successful album. It contains the top 40 singles "Gamble Everything for Love" and "Catch My Disease". "Gamble Everything for Love" was also voted number 15 in the Triple J Hottest 100, 2004 while "Catch My Disease" was #2 in the Triple J Hottest 100, 2005. The song "We're All in This Together" was used on several television advertisements in Australia and New Zealand, including Coca-Cola and The Salvation Army Community Services. It was later featured in Industry SuperFunds ad from 2016 to the present.

At the J Award of 2005, the album was nominated for Australian Album of the Year.

In October 2010, Awake Is the New Sleep was listed in the book, 100 Best Australian Albums.

== Influences ==
Before writing Awake Is The New Sleep, Lee traveled to India. It was here that he met Sakthi Narayani Amma, who inspired him spiritually and told him he would succeed if he put the message of joy into his music. This was a turning point for Lee. Having experienced criticism for his light heartedness in the past, Lee felt a renewed need to incorporate joy and happiness into his music. Lee also changed his reason for making music, from creating music to get something out of it to creating music as a way to give to others. All of this greatly influenced the music on Awake Is The New Sleep.

== Track listing ==
(all songs written by Lee except where noted)

1. "Whatever It Is" – 3:18
2. "Gamble Everything for Love" – 3:21
3. "Begin" – 4:12
4. "Catch My Disease" (Lee, McGowan Southworth) – 4:14
5. "Apple Candy" – 3:22
6. "Ache for You" – 4:05
7. "Into the Dark" – 2:46
8. "No Right Angles" – 3:34
9. "Get Gotten" – 3:07
10. "Close I've Come" – 3:23
11. "The Debt Collectors" – 2:50
12. "We're All in This Together" – 4:39
13. "Light" – 9:48
14. "I'm Willing" – 4:01

== Credits ==
- Ben Lee – vocals, guitar, bass, percussion
- Lara Meyerratken – keyboards, vocals, drums, percussion, "atmosphere"
- McGowan Southworth – guitar, vocals, keyboards, percussion
- Brad Wood – drums on tracks 2, 4 and 7; bass; drum programming; saxophone; vocals; percussion
- Jason Schwartzman – drums on tracks 10 and 13
- Eric Gardner – drums on tracks 8 and 12
- Rob Hann – bass on tracks 8 and 12
- Chick Wolverton – percussion

=== Party vocals ===
- Har Mar Superstar
- Jenny Lewis
- Jason Falkner
- Scarlett Chorvatt
- Melanie Sirmons
- Sam Spiegel
- Jason Boesel
- Olivia Asta Wood
- Gracie Garcia
- Katie Mulcahy

== Charts ==
=== Weekly charts ===
Chart (2005)	Peak position
Australian Albums (ARIA)	5

=== Year-end charts ===
Chart (2005)	Position
Australian Albums (ARIA)	21
Chart (2006)	Position
Australian Albums (ARIA)	69

== Certifications ==
Region	Certification	Certified units/sales
Australia (ARIA)	2× Platinum	140,000^{^}
^{^} Shipments figures based on certification alone.
