= Amanecer (film) =

- Promotional poster for Amanecer
- Directed by: Alvaro D. Ruiz
- Written by: Alvaro D. Ruiz
- Produced by: Ulysses Oliver; Luci Temple
- Starring: Jessica Chapnik; Matias Stevens
- Cinematography: Ross Giardina
- Edited by: Alejandro Reyes Anzola (as Alex Reyes) (rough cut); Alvaro D. Ruiz
- Music by: Patrick Nellestein
- Production companies: Puracé Pictures, Marshmallow Productions
- Release date: 28 May 2009 (Dungog Film Festival)
- Running time: 14:00
- Countries: Australia; Colombia
- Languages: English; Spanish

Amanecer (English: Daybreak) is a 2009 short film written and directed by Alvaro D. Ruiz, produced by Ulysses Oliver and Luci Temple of Marshmallow Productions. It is a Spanish-language drama set in Sydney, Australia.

Amanecer was one of four projects competitively selected for the 2008 Multicultural Mentorship Scheme, a Metro Screen and NSWFTO joint initiative. Australian actor and producer Claudia Karvan was the project’s mentor.

== Synopsis ==
A young South American man struggles to build a new life for his wife and children in Australia. But, in this foreign land, his education and experience doesn’t seem to count. Dreams turn to lies. Lies become reality. Does he have the will to see the light of Amanecer?

== Cast ==
- Matias Stevens – Juan
- Jessica Chapnik – Andrea
- Avital Greenberg-Teplitsky - Mariana

== Accolades ==
Awards

- Best Actor - Colourfest Film Festival, 2011.
- Best Editing - El Espejo Film Festival, 2010.
- Local Filmmaker Award for Best Short Film - Sydney Latin American Film Festival, 2009.

Festivals – Official Selection

- Colourfest Film Festival, 2011.
- Santafé de Antioquia Film Festival, 2010.
- Cortópolis Film Festival, 2010.
- Colombian Cinema Showcase, 2010.
- El Espejo Film Festival, 2010.
- International Short Film Week, 2010.
- Dungog Film Festival, 2009.
- Sydney Latin American Film Festival, 2009.
- Bogotá Film Festival, 2009.
- Villa de Leyva International Film Festival, 2009.
- Los Angeles Latino International Film Festival, 2009.
- Adelaide Shorts Film Festival, 2009.
- Havana Film Festival, 2009.
