= Signal Hill Transmission =

- Origin: Los Angeles, California, United States
- Genres: Rock
- Members: Scott Warren; Duane Rakestraw; Mon Agranat; Scott Schoen

Signal Hill Transmission is an American rock band from Los Angeles, California, United States. Their sound has been likened to Wilco, Elliott Smith, the Scud Mountain Boys, as well as The Psychedelic Furs and Kent. The current lineup consists of Scott Warren (singer/guitarist), Duane Rakestraw (bass), Mon Agranat (guitar), and Scott Schoen (drums).

The band formed in Warren's Hermosa Beach, California apartment in 2001 and recorded and released two independent records: Tomorrow, The Stars on the label P.A. Juice in 2005 and An Empty Space in 2007. In 2006, actor Samuel L. Jackson placed the band's song "Master Plan" on his iTunes Store celebrity playlist. In January 2008, the band won $25,000 in the "Rockstar" competition sponsored by Star 98.7 in Los Angeles. In May of that year they entered the studio to record with producer Brad Wood. The result, an EP called Starting Gun, was released by ATO Records on September 23, 2008. Recently, the band was selected by Clear Channel Music as an artist to watch for 2009.

The band was most recently featured in a 2010 episode of Food Network's Giada at Home, entitled "Dinner With the Band", in which Giada De Laurentiis throws the a dinner party, serving bibb lettuce salads, penne with braised short ribs, and apple shandys.

In July 2009, singer Scott Warren recorded and released a debut solo effort, Quick Fix Bandage, that features a cover of America's, "Sister Golden Hair".
