= Virginwool =

American rock band

Virginwool was a rock band based out of Orlando, Florida originally known as Gumwrapper Curb.

== Gumwrapper Curb ==
The band started in the early 1990s when Rollins College students Gar Willard and Jordan Pouzzner put together an acoustic act known as Gumwrapper Curb. In 1995, bassist Adam Loewy and drummer Mathew McCauley joined the band to flesh out the sound. The self-titled Gumwrapper Curb demo EP was released in 1996 and the band began playing shows.

== Women and success ==
With the addition of Orlando music scene veteran (Braille Closet, Triple D, Choke, Blue Meridian) drummer Erik Lievano, the band began earning a name for themselves in Florida and other southern states. Their 1997 release Women featured the song "You're the Girl," which WJRR and other local radio stations began playing. The band then began getting booked on shows with the likes of Matchbox 20, Creed, Seven Mary Three, The Nixons, and Sister Hazel. The band was also featured on several volumes of the Axis music compilations. The success of the Women CD, combined with the success of the band's live shows, got them signed to a major label. Lievano would exit the band in late 1997.

The band, now with drummer Brett Crook, signed to Universal Records. However, Universal and the band didn't see eye to eye on what their sound should be. They ended up leaving Universal and signing with Atlantic Records, through its smaller branch Breaking, which was started by members of Hootie & The Blowfish. The band changed their name to Virginwool, taking the name from the title of a song from the Women CD. The band began recording with Brad Wood and eventually released their debut full length Open Heart Surgery on August 8, 2000.

Prior to the release of the album, the band recruited second guitarist Jerry Paulson and began performing vigorously throughout the United States. After the recording of their debut, the band went on to hire touring guitarist Michael Rizzo. This was later highlighted by an extended tour with Hootie & the Blowfish and live appearance on The Oxygen Channel. "I Think Her Mother Loves Me" and "Better for You" were released as singles from Open Heart Surgery.

== End of the band ==
After touring behind Open Heart Surgery, the band members decided to go their own ways. Adam Loewy played with several different musicians, including Peter Searcy. Brett Crook went on to tour and record with Florida-based soul band The Legendary JC's, Mississippi Blues Artist and Grammy nominated Cedric Burnside, Bill 'SauceBoss' Wharton and more. Mathew McCauley, the band's original drummer, went on to serve as a musician in the Army before training and working as a military clinical psychologist. Jordan Pouzzner begin recording a solo album, tentatively titled Happy Bleeding, before his death in a car accident in 2005.
