= All the Houses Look the Same =

Studio album by Deas Vail
- Released: March 6, 2007
- Genre: Indie rock, alternative rock
- Length: 50:45
- Label: Brave New World
- Producer: Mark Lee Townsend

Deas Vail chronology
This Place Is Painted Red (2005)	All the Houses Look the Same (2007)	Birds and Cages (2010)

All the Houses Look the Same is the first full-length album by indie rock band Deas Vail. It was released on March 6, 2007, under Brave New World Records.

== Track listing ==
1. "Standing..."
2. "Light as Air"
3. "Surface"
4. "Rewind"
5. "Shoreline"
6. "A Lover's Charm"
7. "Follow Sound"
8. "Anything You Say"
9. "Shadows and City Lights"
10. "For Miles to Come"
11. "Life in These Little Boats"
12. "This Place is Painted Red"
13. "...Still"
