= Freedom, Love and the Recuperation of the Human Mind =

Studio album by Ben Lee
- Released: 21 October 2016
- Studios: Ben Lee's home studio (Lauren Canyon, California); Grant-Lee Phillips' home studio (Nashville, Tennessee)
- Genre: Pop
- Length: 33:58
- Label: Gold VE
- Producer: Ben Lee

Ben Lee chronology
Love Is the Great Rebellion (2015)	Freedom, Love and the Recuperation of the Human Mind (2016)	Ben Lee Sings Songs About Islam for the Whole Family (2017)

Freedom, Love and the Recuperation of the Human Mind is the eleventh studio album by Australian singer Ben Lee. It was recorded at Lee's home in Lauren Canyon, California, as well as the home of Grant-Lee Phillips in Nashville, Tennessee. It was released on 21 October 2016.

== Background ==
In an interview with AAA Backstage, Ben Lee talked of Freedom, Love and The Recuperation of the Human Mind as being a concept album dedicated to winning back the right to think for ourselves:

"Well, freedom is kind of underappreciated and it’s like we all believe we’re free. You could say that is almost the biggest hurdle to our actual freedom. We’re all born in the system, we’re indoctrinated, we take on other people’s ideas and other people’s bad views. The urge for real freedom, the freedom of our minds like the matrix, is something that involves a profound effort and a profound battle, and doing that while being a parent and having a job and everything is what the album’s really about."

Lee also claimed in an interview with The Sydney Morning Herald that the album was the sparsest he had made in his career to-date, with inspiration from folk music traditions and lyrics revolving around concepts such as domestic bliss with his wife, Ione Skye, and advice to his children:

"We like to schlep the kids around with us while we're doing things, whether it's Ione directing or me playing. We want them to see us working and being passionate about things .The media sells this idea that the goal of life is to get to the point where it's a nice holiday, as opposed to the goal of your life being to become passionately engaged"

== Reception ==
Freedom, Love and the Recuperation of the Human Mind was rated at three-out-of-five stars by Rolling Stone (Australia)'s Jaymz Clements, who explained, "Lee walks a blurred line of dewey-eyed idealistic optimism and insufferable pretension, but his transition from precocious pop maestro to folksy 'adult' pop has been quietly impressive." Music Feeds' Mike Honen observed, "International tensions are at an all-time high, the environment is evaporating before us and the weather is so inconsistent none of us know what to wear. The world right now really needs the soothing contemplations of [Lee]." Craig Mathieson of The Sydney Morning Herald felt, "Influenced by the folk music tradition, it's the sparsest album Lee has made, with the lyrics in the foreground."

== Track listing ==
1. "What's Good Is Good" – 3:08
2. "The Enemy Within" – 3:59
3. "Cosmic Science" – 3:12
4. "Bigger Than Me" – 3:51
5. "Land of Criminals" – 3:16
6. "Two Questions" – 3:22
7. "Thunder" – 4:03
8. "Simple Gospel" – 5:00
9. "Rebel Eagle" – 4:02

== Personnel ==
Musicians

- Ben Lee – vocals, acoustic guitar
- Grant-Lee Phillips – banjo, guitar, keyboards, vocals, bass, melodica
- Dan Antunovich – bass
- Nick Gaffaney – drums, percussion
- Edo Khan – guitar
- Alexander Burke – keyboards, vibraphone, guitar, piano
- Kerenza Peacock – violin
- Sara Watkins – vocals

Production

- Jose Alcantar – mixing
- Hans Dekline – mastering
- Ben Lee – writer
