= Love Me Like the World Is Ending =

Single by Ben Lee

from the album Ripe
- B-side: "Sex Without Love"; "What Would Jay-Z Do?"
- Released: August 4, 2007
- Genre: Pop
- Length: 3:46
- Label: Inertia Distribution
- Songwriter: Ben Lee

Ben Lee singles chronology
"We're All in This Together" (2006)	"Love Me Like the World Is Ending" (2007)	"Numb" (2007)

"Love Me Like the World Is Ending" is a song performed by Ben Lee and is the first single from his album Ripe. It was the second most added song to Australian radio in its first week. It reached number 18 on the Australian singles chart and was voted number 96 in the Triple J Hottest 100, 2007.

The single featured two other tracks which were also subsequently released on the album Ripe - "Sex Without Love" and "What Would Jay-Z Do?".

This was the first song featured in the TV series Life Unexpected.

== Track listing ==
1. "Love Me Like the World Is Ending" – 3:46
2. "Sex Without Love" – 3:32
3. "What Would Jay-Z Do?" – 2:53
4. "Love Me Like the World Is Ending" (acoustic demo version) – 5:06

== Charts ==
Chart (2007–08)	Peak position
Australia (ARIA)	18
