= Grandpaw Would =

Studio album by Ben Lee
- Released: 22 June 1995
- Genre: Indie pop
- Length: 41:48
- Label: Fellaheen (AUS); Grand Royal (USA); Toshiba-EMI (Japan)
- Producer: Brad Wood

Ben Lee chronology
Grandpaw Would (1995)	Something to Remember Me By (1997)

Grandpaw Would is the first solo studio album by Australian musician Ben Lee, released in 1995 as his band Noise Addict disbanded.

== Critical reception ==
Professional ratings
Review scores
Source	Rating
AllMusic	3/5 stars
Rolling Stone	3.5/5 stars

Rolling Stone wrote that "Lee pumps out love song after love song, and the fact that he makes you laugh out loud doesn't mean that you can't see the emotion behind the jokes."

== Track listing ==
1. "Pop Queen" – 3:28
2. "How Can That Be?" – 1:58
3. "Sprawl" – 1:28
4. "I'm with the Star" – 3:44
5. "Don't Leave" – 1:58
6. "Away with the Pixies" – 3:02
7. "Bolt" – 1:03
8. "Side View" – 2:39
9. "Pathetic" – 1:08
10. "Song 4 You" – 2:37
11. "Trying to Sneeze" – 2:26
12. "The Loft" – 2:27
13. "Frigid" – 2:29
14. "Stumbling Block" – 2:56
15. "Ductile" – 1:25
16. "Love Song" – 0:52
17. "Green Hearts" – 2:41
18. "My Guitar" – 3:27
19. "Get Your Sleep" *
20. "The Waiting Game" *
21. "Be a Kid" *

[* Japanese bonus tracks]

== Singles ==
- "Pop Queen" (1994)
- "Away with the Pixies" (1995)
