= Hey You. Yes You. =

Studio album by Ben Lee
- Released: 15 November 2002 (Australia)
- Genre: Indie pop
- Label: Modular Recordings (Australia); F-2 (United States)
- Producer: Dan the Automator

Ben Lee chronology
Breathing Tornados (1998)	Hey You. Yes You. (2002)	Awake Is the New Sleep (2005)

Singles from Hey You. Yes You.
- 1. "Something Borrowed, Something Blue" Released: 2002; 2. "Running with Scissors" Released: 2002

Professional ratings
Review scores
Source	Rating
AllMusic	3/5 stars
Drowned in Sound	7/10
The New Zealand Herald	3/5 stars
Pitchfork	3.1/10

hey you. yes you. is the fourth studio album by Australian musician Ben Lee, released in November 2002. The album peaked at number 45 on the ARIA charts.

The single, "Something Borrowed, Something Blue", was voted #22 in the Triple J Hottest 100, 2002.

== Track listing ==
1. "Running with Scissors" – 3:32
2. "Aftertaste" – 3:16
3. "Dirty Mind" – 4:15
4. "Something Borrowed, Something Blue" – 4:02
5. "Run" – 3:31
6. "Chills" – 3:26
7. "Music 4 the Young & Foolish" – 3:15
8. "No Room to Bleed" – 3:48
9. "On and On" – 3:59
10. "Shine" – 4:08
11. "In the Morning" – 3:00
12. "Still on the Line" – 5:37

== Charts ==
Chart (2002)	Peak position
Australian Albums (ARIA)	45
