= In Three Persons =

Studio album by Lovelite
- Released: June 12, 2012
- Genre: Worship, Christian rock, synthpop, indie rock, pop rock
- Length: 54:00
- Label: Come&Live!

In Three Persons is the third studio album by Lovelite. Come&Live! Records released the album on June 12, 2012.

== Critical reception ==
Professional ratings
Review scores
| Source | Rating |
|---|---|
| CM Addict | 4/5 stars |
| Cross Rhythms | 9/10 squares |
| Jesus Freak Hideout | 4.5/5 stars |
| New Release Today | 4.5/5 stars |

Awarding the album four and a half stars at Jesus Freak Hideout, Scott Fryberger wrote, "With fantastic 80s-tinged indie pop and worshipful, passionate and honest lyrics from the Polfers... [yet] It's not without its flaws, but they're not often." Dawn Teresa, giving the album four stars from New Release Today, wrots, "Musically creative and unique, the band has created a lush soundscape on In Three Persons to sing praises to our triune God." Rating the album a nine out of ten for Cross Rhythms, Tony Cummings described "a heart-stirring album". David Bunce, indicating in a four star review by CM Addict, wrote, "While other songs bring a high-energy vibrancy that keeps the album away from stagnant pools of repetition."

== Track listing ==
| No. | Title | Length |
|---|---|---|
| 1. | "Brother Sister" | 3:46 |
| 2. | "Heart Starts Beating" | 3:48 |
| 3. | "King of Love" | 3:57 |
| 4. | "Every Breathe Is a Chance" | 5:38 |
| 5. | "Teach Me" | 3:15 |
| 6. | "All Fair" | 4:42 |
| 7. | "Collided" | 4:06 |
| 8. | "Your Love Is As Wide As It's Tall" | 2:25 |
| 9. | "Overcome" | 4:56 |
| 10. | "Strength of the Father's Love" | 4:15 |
| 11. | "Sand & Stone" | 4:17 |
| 12. | "(PS)" | 2:00 |
| 13. | "Wonderful Jesus" | 4:02 |
| 14. | "Our Holy Ghost" | 3:00 |
| Total length: | | 54:00 |
