= Ayahuasca: Welcome to the Work =

Studio album by Ben Lee
- Released: 22 April 2013
- Genre: New-age
- Length: 52:14
- Label: Lojinx
- Producer: Ben Lee

Ben Lee chronology
Deeper Into Dream (2011)	Ayahuasca: Welcome to the Work (2013)	Love Is the Great Rebellion (2015)

Ayahuasca: Welcome to the Work is the title of the ninth studio album by Australian indie pop musician Ben Lee, written and produced in collaboration with Jessica Chapnik Kahn. It was funded by crowd-sourcing platform Pledge Music and was released in Australia on 22 April 2013.

The album is based upon Lee's and Chapnik Kahn's personal experiences with the South American healing medicine, ayahuasca, known for its psychoactive properties that are reported to lead the consumer to a state of spiritual awakening. The idea behind the recording was to sonically document the inner journey experienced while partaking in the ayahuasca ceremony. Lee himself describes the album as "dynamic and joyful, meditative and tender, playful and experimental," and hopes that "the music contains some small portion of the deep nourishment that I have experienced from the plant medicine."

The album's cover art was painted by Lee's wife, Ione Skye.

100% of the artist royalties collected from album sales will be donated to the Multidisciplinary Association for Psychedelic Studies and the Amazon Conservation Team.

== Track listing ==
All tracks are written by Ben Lee and Jessica Chapnik Kahn.

No.	Title	Length
1.	"Invocation"	1:49
2.	"Welcome to the House of Mystical Death"	5:09
3.	"Meditation On Being Born"	7:47
4.	"In the Silence"	5:36
5.	"The Shadow of the Mind"	5:00
6.	"The Will to Grow"	5:18
7.	"On My Knees"	5:57
8.	"I Am That I Am"	5:17
9.	"Song for Samuel"	4:53
10.	"Thank You"	5:28

== Charts ==
Chart (2013)	Peak position
US Heatseekers Albums (Billboard)	47
