= Sam Holden (Home and Away) =

Fictional character from Home and Away

- Home and Away character
- Portrayed by: Jessica Chapnik
- Duration: 2006–2008
- First appearance: 17 October 2006
- Last appearance: 15 April 2008
- Introduced by: Julie McGauran
In-universe information
- Other names: Kylie Deeks; Sam Tolhurst
- Occupation: Physiotherapist
- Sisters: Britt Grey
- Husband: Shane Deeks; Jack Holden (2007–08)
- Sons: Rory Tolhurst
- Daughters: Jessica Deeks

Samantha Holden (previously Deeks and Tolhurst) is a fictional character from the Australian Channel Seven soap opera Home and Away, played by Jessica Chapnik. She made her first on-screen appearance on 17 October 2006.

== Character development ==
In 2006 Chapnik secured the role of Sam by chance. In 2008, it was announced that Chapnik was leaving Home and Away to pursue a career in the United States.

Chapnik said Sam was an interesting character to play because she was "full of self-loathing and was so misunderstood". Sam was "doomed to fail from the beginning" and her "decline made sense" because she was always "quite tragic". Sam's "heaviness" made it hard for Chapnik to defend her actions, Chapnik also felt she had never experienced this with any other character.

Sam is involved in a love triangle storyline through her relationship with Jack Holden (Paul O'Brien) and his ex-wife Martha MacKenzie (Jodi Gordon). Martha feels low after an abortion and kisses Jack, while Sam watches. O'Brien stated in an interview with Yahoo, "I think Jack felt like "Oh this is nice, but I've moved on, I've finally moved on and found someone, but deep down he still wants Martha." O'Brien added that he believes Jack was always in love with Martha, even whilst with he was in a relationship with Sam. Martha later tries on Sam's wedding dress, causing more trouble. Gordon said that viewers would have rather seen Jack with Martha.

In one storyline Sam becomes involved in a feud with Johnny Cooper (Callan Mulvey). He physically attacks Sam and threatens her son, Rory Tolhurst (Jack Rickard), to force her into helping with his plan to kill Sally Fletcher (Kate Ritchie). Johnny begins blackmailing Sam and she decides to attack him with a cricket bat. Johnny survives and is taken to hospital where Sam murders him by administering a srynge of drugs. Despite her actions Jack reads a letter that Johnny wrote detailing the truth about Sam's past. Sam's exit storyline was played out in secret. Viewers were kept in suspense when an unidentified body washes up on the beach. It is eventually revealed to be Sam's. However, Sam had killed herself and attempted to frame Jack and Martha for her "murder".

== Storylines ==
Sam attends to Jack after he loses the use of his legs. They form a bond and begin training. Jack quizzes Sam about her love life and she is evasive. One night, Sam opens up about her husband, Shane (Mike Duncan) and the breakdown of their marriage after the death of their daughter, Jessica. Sam and Jack grow closer together and they begin a relationship. Shane later kidnaps Rory (Ed Wills) but he dies in the ensuing police chases and Rory is returned unharmed. Sam and Rory leave the bay but return and settle in the area.

Jack proposes and Sam accepts but there is an obstacle; Jack's ex-wife, Martha. Things are not helped when Sam catches Martha in her wedding dress. Martha tries to stop the wedding but she is too late. Several weeks later, Johnny Cooper (Callan Mulvey), a cellmate of Shane escapes and blackmails Sam into helping him track down and kill Sally Fletcher. After Johnny attacks her, Sam hits him over the head with a cricket bat when he is about to stab Ric Dalby (Mark Furze). Johnny is left brain damaged and Sam kills him by giving him an overdose of medication. Jack finds a letter Johnny has hidden and attempts to arrest Sam but she tells him she is pregnant. Sam is unwilling to go quietly and suffers a miscarriage in a struggle with Jack.

Sam leaves for the city with Rory but he refuses to leave with her. Sam, having lost everything decides to commit suicide and in one final act of revenge, she frames Jack and Martha for murder. The evidence is overwhelming and Martha and Jack are looking at a prison sentence until Morag Bellingham (Cornelia Frances) theorises that Sam had killed herself, which is proven at the last minute when Jack tracks down the drug dealer, Joe Stephens (Terence Hepburn) who'd sold Sam the heroin and been forced to bruise her. Sam's funeral is held in the city. Rory, who blames Jack for Sam's death, orders Jack not to attend.

== Reception ==
Eleven Magazine opined that Sam caused "quite a bit of chaos in the sleepy town of Summer Bay". Scott Ellis of The Sun-Herald said Sam was like a "murderous psycho". Carolyn Stewart writing for TV Week said that following Sam's "erratic behaviour" and murder of Johnny, that it "was only a matter of time before karma caught up with her" and she died. While Inside Soap said that Sam's "cock-up" was not expecting that Morag would uncover the truth behind her death. They also opined that Sam should not have killed herself, because "revenge doesn't taste quite so sweet if you're not around to savour it." Critics writing for the Daily Record have branded Sam as a "moralising physiotherapist" and a "meddling physiotherapist". A fellow disappointed critic bemoaned Sam's murder technique because killing Johnny with the cricket bat would have been "far more impressive".
