= Birds and Cages =

Birds And Cages

Studio album by Deas Vail
- Released: January 26, 2010
- Genre: Indie rock
- Length: 45:56
- Label: Mono vs Stereo
- Producer: Mark Lee Townsend

Deas Vail chronology
All the Houses Look the Same (2007)	Birds And Cages (2010)	Deas Vail (2011)

Birds and Cages is the second full-length album by Deas Vail. It was released on January 26, 2010 through Mono vs Stereo. Their previous album, All the Houses Look the Same, was released on the label Brave New World. Brave New World underwent some financial complications and had to un-sign Deas Vail. They were then signed by Mono vs Stereo, and the album was released under the new label.

== Track listing ==
1. "The Things You Were" – 4:58
2. "Growing Pains" – 3:57
3. "Excuses" – 3:18
4. "Cages" – 5:08
5. "Birds" – 4:51 (feat. Matthew Thiessen of Relient K)
6. "Tell Me" – 0:48
7. "Dance In Perfect Time" – 3:28
8. "Sunlight" – 4:07
9. "Puzzles and Pieces" – 2:51
10. "The Great Physician" – 3:38
11. "The Leaper" – 4:01
12. "Atlantis" – 4:51
