= Deas Vail (album) =

Studio album by Deas Vail
- Released: October 11, 2011
- Recorded: October 2010–July 2011
- Genre: Indie
- Label: Mono vs Stereo (U.S.); Gotee Records (international)
- Producer: Matt Hoopes

Deas Vail chronology
Birds and Cages (2010)	Deas Vail (2011)

Professional ratings
Review scores
Source	Rating
AbsolutePunk	3/5 stars
Jesus Freak Hideout	4/5 stars

Deas Vail is the third studio album by the indie rock band Deas Vail, released on October 11, 2011. This was the last record in which original drummer Kelsey Harelson recorded with the band. He played his last show with Deas Vail in Russellville, Arkansas on January 13, 2011. This was also the first album by Deas Vail that Mark Lee Townsend did not produce, and instead was produced by the band and Relient K guitarist Matt Hoopes.

== Song listing ==
1. "Desire"
2. "Sixteen"
3. "Quiet Like Sirens"
4. "Summer Forgets Me"
5. "Towers"
6. "Pulling Down the Sun"
7. "Bad Dreams"
8. "Wake Up and Sleep"
9. "Common Sense"
10. "The Right Mistakes"
11. "The Meaning of a Word"
12. "Meeting in Doorways"

== Personnel ==
Deas Vail

- Wes Blaylock - Vocals, acoustic guitar
- Justin Froning - Bass
- Laura Blaylock - Keyboards, piano, vocals
- Andy Moore - Guitar, backing vocals
- Kelsey Harelson - Drums
- Wes Saunders - Percussion

Production

- Matt Hoopes - Producer
- Nathan Dantzler - Mastering engineer
- Dave Hagan - Recording engineer
- Lane Johnson - Drum technician
- Brad Wood - Mixing
