= Ripe (Ben Lee album) =

Studio album by Ben Lee
- Released: 18 September 2007
- Genre: Indie pop
- Label: Inertia, New West
- Producer: John Alagia

Ben Lee chronology
Awake Is the New Sleep (2005)	Ripe (2007)	The Rebirth of Venus (2009)

Singles from Ripe
- 1. "Love Me Like the World Is Ending" Released: August 2007; 2. "Numb" Released: October 2007

Professional ratings
Aggregate scores
Source	Rating
Metacritic	62/100
Review scores
Source	Rating
AllMusic	3.5/5 stars
The Boston Phoenix	3/4 stars
Drowned in Sound	5/10
musicOMH	2/5 stars
Paste	1.5/5 stars
Q	3/5 stars
Spin	5/10
Uncut	4/5 stars

Ripe is the sixth album by Australian musician Ben Lee, released on 18 September 2007. Produced by John Alagia, the album features guest appearances from Mandy Moore, Benji Madden, Benmont Tench, Rachael Yamagata, Rooney, Sara Watkins and Charlotte Martin.

It entered the ARIA Albums Chart at No. 11 on 24 September.

== Track listing ==
1. "Love Me Like the World Is Ending" (featuring Rachael Yamagata) – 3:46
2. "American Television" (featuring Rooney) – 3:40
3. "Birds and Bees" (featuring Mandy Moore) – 3:09
4. "Is This How Love's Supposed to Feel?" (featuring Charlotte Martin) – 4:17
5. "Blush" – 3:55
6. "Numb" – 2:57
7. "What Would Jay-Z Do?" – 2:54
8. "Sex Without Love" (featuring Benji Madden) – 3:31
9. "Home" – 2:39
10. "So Hungry" – 3:34
11. "Just Say Yes" – 5:24
12. "Ripe" – 3:05

== Personnel ==
- John Alagia – guitar, acoustic guitar, electric guitar, tack piano, organ, shaker, tambourine, background vocals
- Matt Chamberlain – drums, tambourine, percussion
- Mark Goldenberg – electric guitar, slide guitar
- Nick Johns – piano, Fender Rhodes piano, harmonium, Wurlitzer organ, Mellotron, ARP synthesizer, Moog synthesizer, vibraphone
- Charlotte Martin – piano, background vocals
- Mandy Moore – vocals, background vocals
- Todd M. Simon – trumpet
- Sara Watkins – background vocals
- Ben Lee – vocals, acoustic guitar, electric guitar

== Charts ==
Chart (2007)	Peak position
Australian Albums (ARIA)	11
US Heatseekers Albums (Billboard)	8
US Independent Albums (Billboard)	35

== Certifications ==
Region	Certification	Certified units/sales
Australia (ARIA)	Gold	35,000^{^}
^{^} Shipments figures based on certification alone.
