= Lovelite (band) =

American Christian pop rock worship band

- Origin: Southern California
- Genres: Worship, Christian rock, indie rock, pop rock
- Years active: 2008–present
- Labels: Come&Live!
- Members: Andrew Polfer; Jen Polfer; Brandon Burr; Jonathan Hall
- Past members: Adam Taylor; Darla Hawn
- Website: www.lovelitemusic.com

Lovelite is an American Christian music pop rock worship band from Southern California, where they play a version of Christian rock, CCM, indie rock, and synthpop music. Their two main members are husband-and-wife, Andrew and Jen Polfer. They have released four extended plays and three studio albums, mostly with Come&Live! Records, where they got attention for In Three Persons.

== Background ==
Lovelite is a Southern California-based Christian pop rock worship group, established in 2008, who are a co-lead vocalist husband-and-wife lead band Andrew Polfer and Jen Polfer, where she is a keyboardist, Brandon Burr, a keyboardist and bassist, and Jonathan Hall, a keyboardist and guitarist. Their former members were guitarist and keyboardist, Adam Taylor, and drummer, Darla Hawn.

== Music history ==
The band started as a musical entity in 2008, where they drew the most attention for the studio album, In Three Persons, that was released on June 12, 2012, from Come&Live! Records. Recently, Andrew Polfer co-wrote the song 'Body Mind & Soul' with Phil Wickham. It appears on Wickham's Living Hope album (2019).

== Members ==
Current members

- Andrew Polfer - vocals, guitar
- Jen Polfer - vocals, guitar, keys
- Brandon Burr - bass, keys
- Jonathan Hall - guitar, keys

Former members

- Adam Taylor - guitar, keys
- Darla Hawn - drums

== Discography ==
Independent albums

- All Color (2008)

Studio albums

- All Color (2009, Come&Live!)
- Nearness (2010, Come&Live!)
- In Three Persons (2012, Come&Live!)
- Apocolypse Hymnal (2018, Independent)

EPs

- The Faithful Father (2011/12, Come&Live!)
- His Beloved Son (2011/12, Come&Live!)
- Our Holy Ghost (2011/12, Come&Live!)
- Hopeful Strangers (October 30, 2015, Independent)
