= Ben Lee =

Australian actor and singer (born 1978)

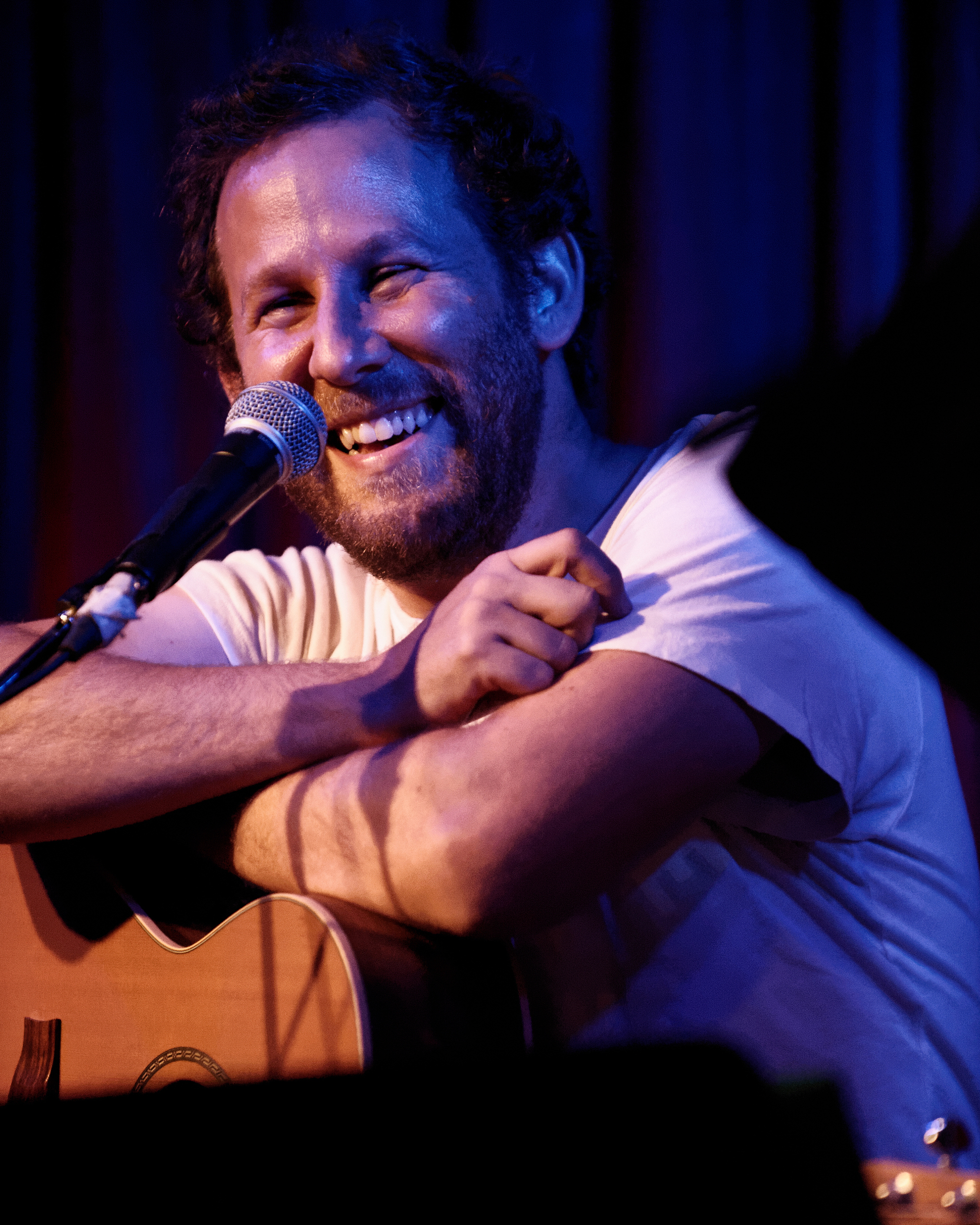
- Lee on 2 September 2016

Background information
- Also known as: DJ Dad Bod
- Born: Benjamin Michael Lee; 11 September 1978 (age 48); Sydney, New South Wales, Australia
- Genre: Indie pop
- Instruments: Vocals; guitar; bass; piano
- Years active: 1993–present
- Labels: Ten Fingers/Inertia; ABC Music; Dangerbird; Modular; New West Records; Lojinx; Dew Process
- Member of: Radnor and Lee
- Formerly of: Noise Addict; Gerling; The Bens
- Spouse: Ione Skye (m. 2008)
- Website: ben-lee.com

Benjamin Michael Lee (born 11 September 1978) is an Australian musician and actor. Lee began his career as a musician at the age of 14 with the Sydney band Noise Addict, but he focused on his solo career when the band broke up in 1995. He appeared as the protagonist in the Australian film The Rage in Placid Lake (2003). He has released eleven solo studio albums.

== Career ==
=== Noise Addict ===
Lee's musical career began in 1993 with the band Noise Addict, who were signed to Steve Pavlovic's independent label Fellaheen Records, on the strength of a self-produced and distributed four-track demo recorded in Lee's bedroom. Pavlovic's connections brought the band to the attention of Sonic Youth's Thurston Moore and Beastie Boys' Mike D, both of whom released the band's material in the US.

The group put out several releases on the Beasties' Grand Royal Records. These included the acoustic Young and Jaded EP in 1994, which contained Lee's tribute to Evan Dando, "I Wish I Was Him". In 1995, Grand Royal released the band's only full-length album, the Brad Wood–produced Meet the Real You. Noise Addict made a music video for the song "16", toured with Sebadoh, but then broke up. Lee was also briefly a member of the alternative act Gerling.

In 2009, Lee recorded a new Noise Addict album, It Was Never About the Audience, with a new lineup: Lou Barlow and Lara Meyerratken.

=== Solo career ===
Lee's solo career started at the age of 16, while he was still in Noise Addict. He began recording his first solo album, Grandpaw Would, in both Sydney and Chicago with producer Brad Wood. This was followed by the 1997 album, Something to Remember Me By, also produced by Wood. An alternate version of his song "Burn to Shine", produced by T-Bone Burnett, played over the end credits of the film Best Men. Lee was then featured on the There's Something About Mary soundtrack, with the song "How to Survive a Broken Heart". 1998's Breathing Tornados, released on Pavlovic's new label Modular, marked a new direction for Lee as he introduced synthesisers and increased instrumentation into his sound.

The album was a success in Australia, earning Lee ARIA Award nominations for Best Male Artist and Album of the Year. The album's first single, "Cigarettes Will Kill You", was also nominated for Single of the Year and finished second in that year's Triple J Hottest 100. In 2001, Lee contributed a track ("Sweet Is the Night") to a Jeff Lynne tribute album Lynne Me Your Ears.

Lee's fourth album, hey you. yes you., was released in 2002. The first single from the album, "Something Borrowed, Something Blue", reached number 67 on the ARIA Charts and number 22 on the 2002's Triple J Hottest 100. The second single, "Running with Scissors", peaked at number 82 on the ARIA charts. In 2003, he also contributed several songs to the Evan Dando solo album Baby I'm Bored.

In late 2004, Lee left Steve Pavlovic's Modular Recordings and started his own record label, Ten Fingers. The first release on the label was the single, "Gamble Everything for Love", followed by the album, Awake Is the New Sleep in February 2005, which went double platinum in Australia. A defining release in his career, the album showcased a much brighter, positive side of Lee's personality, in contrast to his previous darker musings. Awake Is the New Sleep received several nominations for the 2005 Australian Recording Industry Association (ARIA) awards, and Lee won Best Male Artist, Best Independent Release, and Single of the Year for "Catch My Disease", which Lee wrote with Mcgowan Southworth. "Catch My Disease" also went to No. 2 on the 2005 Triple J Hottest 100.

In addition, the song was featured on the soundtracks to the 2005 films Just Friends and Deuce Bigalow: European Gigolo as well as the soundtracks to the television series Grey's Anatomy, Hidden Palms and Scrubs. In 2006, it was used in a television commercial for Dell Computers. On 26 March 2006, Lee performed "We're All in This Together" from Awake Is the New Sleep at the closing ceremony of the 2006 Commonwealth Games. The single for "We're All in This Together" was released on 8 April 2006. The CD includes cover versions of the song by Pony Up, Holidays on Ice and Gelbison. "We're All in This Together" has been used in commercials for Kohl's (2008), Coca-Cola (Remixed Australian Summer Series Ads in 2007), the South Australian Government (2006), the Salvation Army Red Shield Appeal (2007), and Telus Mobility's "My Faves" (2007).

Lee released his sixth album, Ripe, on 18 September 2007, with Benji Madden and Mandy Moore making appearances. Mandy Moore sang a light-hearted, 1950s-style duet with Lee called "Birds and Bees". "Mandy was very sweet and did her best Olivia Newton-John for me. I'm really psyched about this recording," Lee says. Madden helped out with some backing vocals, along with US band Rooney and Sara Watkins from the band Nickel Creek. "American Television" from the album was used in a VH1 advertisement for Flavor of Love 3 and the song "Ripe" appeared in an episode of One Tree Hill (Season 5, episode 2).

In 2007, Lee performed a cover of Crosby, Stills & Nash's "Our House" for Landmarks on The DL.

In February 2009, Lee released his seventh studio album, The Rebirth of Venus, which received mixed reviews. It featured guest performances from the likes of Missy Higgins and Patience Hodgson, and peaked at No.21 on the ARIA Charts.

Lee's eighth studio album, Deeper into Dream, was released on 11 October 2011. It was Lee's first attempt at a concept album, basing the entire 12 tracks around the dream state. Despite not charting, it was received fairly favourably by critics.

In April 2013, Lee released his ninth and arguably his most experimental studio album, entitled Ayahuasca: Welcome to the Work, with collaboration from Jessica Chapnik. The album is based upon his personal experience with the psychoactive South American drug known as Ayahuasca. Lee featured as the mentor for Joel Madden's team on the 2013 season of The Voice Australia.

In June 2015, Lee released his 10th solo album, Love Is the Great Rebellion, his first on a major label, Warner Bros. Records.

According to Radio National's Geoff Wood, Lee invented the term "electro-yoga" to describe a new form of music dedicated to the practice of yoga. Lee has since followed up this release with an acoustically oriented album, entitled Freedom, Love and The Recuperation of the Human Mind, in 2016, as well as a children's album called Ben Lee Sings Songs About Islam for the Whole Family in 2017. Together with former How I Met Your Mother star Josh Radnor, Lee formed an indie-folk duo called Radnor and Lee, and they released their debut self-titled album in November 2017.

2018 saw the release of B Is for Beer, a soundtrack to the musical based on the novel of the same name written by Tom Robbins. Lee and Robbins had collaborated for ten years to develop the musical. Funding for the album's development came via crowd-sourcing at Kickstarter.

Lee released Quarter Century Classix in 2019, a collection of cover songs he was influenced by during his teenage years. In 2020, Radnor and Lee released their second collaborative album, Golden State.

In 2021, Lee competed in the third season of the Australian version of The Masked Singer as "Professor". He finished tenth after being eliminated in the third episode.

In September 2021, The Music Network confirmed Lee had signed with Warner Music Australia, releasing I'M FUN! in June 2022, preceded by single "Born for This Bullshit"; it was Lee's first album to chart in the top-50 ARIA album charts in more than seven years. The deal includes rights to his 19-album back catalogue. This One's for the Old Headz was released in September 2024.

== Personal life ==
Lee was born in Sydney and was raised in a Jewish household but did not consider himself religious as a child. Lee was educated at Moriah College, located in Sydney's eastern suburbs.

Lee dated Claire Danes for several years, but their relationship ended in 2003. He married actress Ione Skye on 28 December 2008, in a Hindu wedding ceremony in India. They have one child.

Lee stated that he follows a pescatarian diet.

== Discography ==
=== Studio albums ===
Title	Details	Peak	Certification
Title	Details	AUS	Certification
Grandpaw Would	Released: 22 June 1995; Label: Fellaheen	—	
Something to Remember Me By	Released: 20 May 1997; Label: Fellaheen	—	
Breathing Tornados	Released: 16 November 1998; Label: Modular	13	ARIA: Gold
hey you. yes you.	Released: 15 November 2002; Label: Modular	45	
Awake Is the New Sleep	Released: 22 February 2005; Label: Ten Fingers	5	ARIA: 2× Platinum
Ripe	Released: 18 September 2007; Label: Ten Fingers	11	ARIA: Gold
The Rebirth of Venus	Released: 6 February 2009; Label: Dew Process	21	
Deeper into Dream	Released: 11 October 2011; Label: Dew Process	—	
Ayahuasca: Welcome to the Work	Released: 22 April 2013; Label: Ten Fingers	—	
Love Is the Great Rebellion	Released: 29 May 2015; Label: Warner Bros.	71	
Freedom, Love and the Recuperation of the Human Mind	Released: 21 October 2016; Label: Ben Lee, ABC Music	—	
Ben Lee Sings Songs About Islam for the Whole Family	Released: 3 March 2017	—	
Quarter Century Classix	Released: 22 November 2019; Label: New West	—	
I'm Fun!	Released: 19 August 2022; Label: Warner Music Australia	46	
This One's for the Old Headz	Released: 20 September 2024; Label: Weirder Together	—	

=== Collaboration albums ===
Title	Details
Radnor & Lee (as Radnor & Lee) (with Josh Radnor)	Released: November 2017; Label: Radnor & Lee
Golden State (as Radnor & Lee) (with Josh Radnor)	Released: 19 June 2020; Label: Flower Moon (MDT 019)
It Was Never About the Audience (with Noise Addict)	Released: 30 November 2023; Label: Weirder Together

=== Soundtrack albums ===
Title	Details
The Square (Motion Picture Soundtrack) (with Jessica Chapnik Kahn)	Released: 31 July 2008
B Is for Beer: The Musical (with Tom Robbins)	Released: 12 October 2018

=== Mixtapes ===
Title	Details
A Mixtape from Ben Lee	Released: 24 February 2015

=== Extended plays ===
Title	Details
Away with the Pixies	Released: 1995; Label: Fellaheen
All Nite Long	Released: 2018; Label: Boutard Musique

=== Singles ===
Title	Year	Peak chart positions		Album
Title	Year	AUS	UK	Album
"Pop Queen"	1994	—	—	Grandpaw Would
"Cigarettes Will Kill You"	1998	46	92	Breathing Tornados
"Nothing Much Happens"	1999	136	95	Breathing Tornados
"Something Borrowed, Something Blue"	2002	67	—	hey you. yes you.
"Running with Scissors"	2003	82	—	hey you. yes you.
"Gamble Everything for Love"	2004	39	—	Awake Is the New Sleep
"Catch My Disease"	2005	27	—	Awake Is the New Sleep
"Into the Dark"^{[A]}	2005	97	—	Awake Is the New Sleep
"We're All in This Together"	2006	59	—	Awake Is the New Sleep
"Love Me Like the World Is Ending"	2007	18	—	Ripe
"Numb"	2007	54	—	Ripe
"I Love Pop Music"	2009	86	—	The Rebirth of Venus
"Rise Up"	2009	—	—	The Rebirth of Venus
"Song for the Divine Mother of the Universe"	2010	—	—	The Rebirth of Venus
"Big Love"	2015	—	—	Love Is the Great Rebellion
"Born for This Bullshit"	2021	—	—	I'm Fun!
"Like This or Like That"	2022	—	—	I'm Fun!
"Parents Get High"	2022	—	—	I'm Fun!
"Arsehole"	2022	—		I'm Fun!
"Tuck Shop" (with Ninajirachi)	2023	—	—	Non-album singles
"Monday Morning" (Rob & Chad featuring Ben Lee)	2023	—	—	Non-album singles
"God Honest Truth" (Shamir featuring Ben Lee)	2024	—	—	Non-album singles
"Over Asking (Sold)"	2024	—	—	Non-album singles
"Lovers"	2024	—	—	This One's for the Old Headz
"Heavy Metal"	2024	—	—	This One's for the Old Headz
"Positive Energy"	2024	—	—	This One's for the Old Headz
"friendly fire" (with FVNERAL)	2025	—	—	

Notes

- A The Australian peak for the Into the Dark EP is on the ARIA Albums Chart.

==== Promotional singles ====
Title	Year	Album
"Career Choice"	1998	Something to Remember Me By
"Dead or Anything" (as part of Dando Lee Petersson Schwartzman)	2002	Dando Lee Petersson Schwartzman
"In My Life"	2005	This Bird Has Flown – A 40th Anniversary Tribute to the Beatles' Rubber Soul
"American Television"	2008	Ripe
"What's So Bad (About Feeling Good)?"	2009	The Rebirth of Venus
"Forgiveness"	2015	Love Is the Great Rebellion
"The Body of Love"	2015	Love Is the Great Rebellion
"Goodbye to Yesterday"	2015	Love Is the Great Rebellion

=== Other appearances ===
- "Itchycoo Park" from I Shot Andy Warhol (1996)
- "Make Your Move" (featuring Ione Skye) from Spider (2007)
- "Beautiful Flirt" (with Ione Skye and Jack Graddis) from Bear (2011)
- "We're All in This Together" (with Jack River and Lime Cordiale) from Music from the Home Front (2020)

== Awards and nominations ==
=== AIR Awards ===
The Australian Independent Record Awards (commonly known informally as AIR Awards) is an annual awards night to recognise, promote and celebrate the success of Australia's Independent Music sector.

Year	Nominee / work	Award	Result	Ref.
2006	Awake Is the New Sleep	Best Performing Independent Album	Nominated	
2006	Ben Lee	Independent Artist of the Year	Nominated	

=== ARIA Music Awards ===
The ARIA Music Awards is an annual awards ceremony that recognises excellence, innovation, and achievement across all genres of Australian music. They commenced in 1987. Lee has won four awards.

Year	Nominee / work	Award	Result	Ref.
1999	Breathing Tornados	Album of the Year	Nominated	
1999	Breathing Tornados	Best Male Artist	Nominated	
1999	"Cigarettes Will Kill You"	Single of the Year	Nominated	
2003	hey you. yes you.	Best Male Artist	Nominated	
2005	"Catch My Disease"	Single of the Year	Won	
2005	Awake Is the New Sleep	Best Male Artist	Won	
2005	Awake Is the New Sleep	Best Independent Release	Won	
2005	Awake Is the New Sleep	Album of the Year	Nominated	
2005	Awake Is the New Sleep	Best Pop Release	Nominated	
2005	Awake Is the New Sleep (Ben Lee, Lara Meyerratken, Dan Estabrook)	Best Cover Art	Won	
2006	"We're All in This Together"	Best Male Artist	Nominated	
2006	"We're All in This Together"	Best Independent Release	Nominated	
2006	Into the Dark	Best Pop Release	Nominated	
2008	Ripe	Best Independent Release	Nominated	
2008	The Square (with Jessica Chapnik)	Best Original Soundtrack, Cast or Show Album	Nominated	

=== APRA Awards ===
The APRA Awards are held in Australia and New Zealand by the Australasian Performing Right Association to recognise songwriting skills, sales and airplay performance by its members annually.

Year	Nominee / work	Award	Result	Ref.
2006	"Catch My Disease"	Song of the Year	Won	
2006	"Catch My Disease"	Most Performed Australian Work	Won	

=== Australian Music Prize ===
The Australian Music Prize (the AMP) is an annual award of $30,000 given to an Australian band or solo artist in recognition of the merit of an album released during the year of award. They commenced in 2005.

Year	Nominee / work	Award	Result	Ref.
2005	Awake Is the New Sleep	Australian Music Prize	Nominated	
