= Deas Vail =

American alternative rock band

- Origin: Russellville, Arkansas
- Genres: Alternative rock
- Years active: 2003—2012
- Labels: Mono Vs Stereo (2009–2012) Brave New World Records (2005–2008)
- Past members: Wes Blaylock; Laura Hudson; Andy Moore; Justin Froning; Wes Saunders; Jonathan Childs; Kelsey Harelson; Reuben Cox; Jeremy Burns; Bobby Jackson

Deas Vail (/ˈdeɪ.əs veɪl/) was an alternative rock band whose lyrics are influenced by their members' Christian faith. The band's name is a combination of Latin and old French, roughly translated as "humble servant of God." Their eponymous third full-length album earned them slots at Bonnaroo and a headlining performance at CMJ.

== History ==
Noted for having musical similarities to Death Cab for Cutie, Mew, Copeland, and Mae, Deas Vail was formed in the university town of Russellville, Arkansas in 2003. In April 2005, after a few years of touring, the band self-released their first album, This Place is Painted Red. Later that year, Deas Vail signed to Brave New World Records (founded by producer Mark Lee Townsend). In the fall of 2006, they released the Collapse EP. Sales for the EP through touring alone exceeded 2,500 units. Deas Vail toured across the nation that year with artists such as The New Frontiers and The Tide.

In late 2006, the band entered the studio again with Mark Lee Townsend to finish their first indie label LP, All the Houses Look the Same. The album was nationally released on March 6, 2007 and featured in magazines such as Alternative Press, Relevant Magazine, and Hard Music Magazine. Another EP, White Lights EP, was released on August 26, 2008. Their album Birds and Cages was released on October 27, 2009 through the revived label Mono vs Stereo, available through the band's website, via iTunes, and on tour. The album had a full physical release on January 26, 2010.

In September 2009, the band toured with Mae, followed by a tour with Owl City and Lights in early 2010. In March and April 2010, Deas Vail toured as an opening band for Copeland on their farewell tour. Deas Vail performed as part of the 2010 Vans Warped Tour from August 1 through August 15. In late 2010, two-fifths of Deas Vail, Wes Blaylock and Andy Moore, performed as an acoustic duo to open a set of Christmas-themed shows with Sherwood and Relient K.

In the music video for "Excuses", all band members were seen wearing an armband with a key attached to it on their left forearm. When questioned at their concert with Owl City and Lights at the Varsity Theatre in Baton Rouge, Laura Blaylock stated, "The keys are kind of from our new album Birds & Cages and they represent freedom from cages."

By October 2010, the band had begun working on their new self-titled album, which was released October 11, 2011. On May 25, 2011, they released a lyric video of their song "Sixteen", with another video, "Summer Forgets Me", premiering on Alt Press' website nearly a month later.

On October 10, 2011, they released their album Deas Vail a day earlier than planned on Amazon at a discounted price. Shortly after, on November 29, 2011, they released a 4-track Christmas EP entitled For Shepherds and Kings. This EP contains traditional Christmas songs as well as a slightly edited lyrical version of the less traditional "Coventry Carol."

Wesley Blaylock released his first solo EP in June 2012. Wesley's sister Hannah Blaylock as well as Laura Blaylock are featured in two of the album's tracks. Around that time, Deas Vail released their final EP, The Side Effect. The EP features six B-sides tracks, two of those tracks being from a previous EP, Under Our Skin.

Up until 2014, Wesley Blaylock consistently posted covers on his YouTube channel. In 2020, he posted five demos on his SoundCloud. It is unclear when these were recorded.

== Band members ==
- Wesley Blaylock – piano, lead vocals
- Laura Blaylock – backup vocals, keyboards, synthesizers
- Justin Froning – bass guitar
- Wes Saunders – drums, percussion
- Andy Moore – guitars

== Discography ==
Title	Date	Label
This Place Is Painted Red	April 27, 2005	Self-published
Collapse	December 12, 2006	Brave New World
All the Houses Look the Same	March 6, 2007	Brave New World
White Lights	August 28, 2008	Brave New World
Birds and Cages	January 26, 2010	Mono Vs Stereo
Under Our Skin	August 23, 2010	Mono Vs Stereo
Split EP (With Farewell Flight)	June 7, 2011	Mono Vs Stereo
Deas Vail	October 11, 2011	Mono Vs Stereo
For Shepherds and Kings	November 29, 2011	Mono Vs Stereo
The Side Effect	June 26, 2012	Mono Vs Stereo

== See also ==
- Mark Lee Townsend
