= Skating Polly =

American rock band

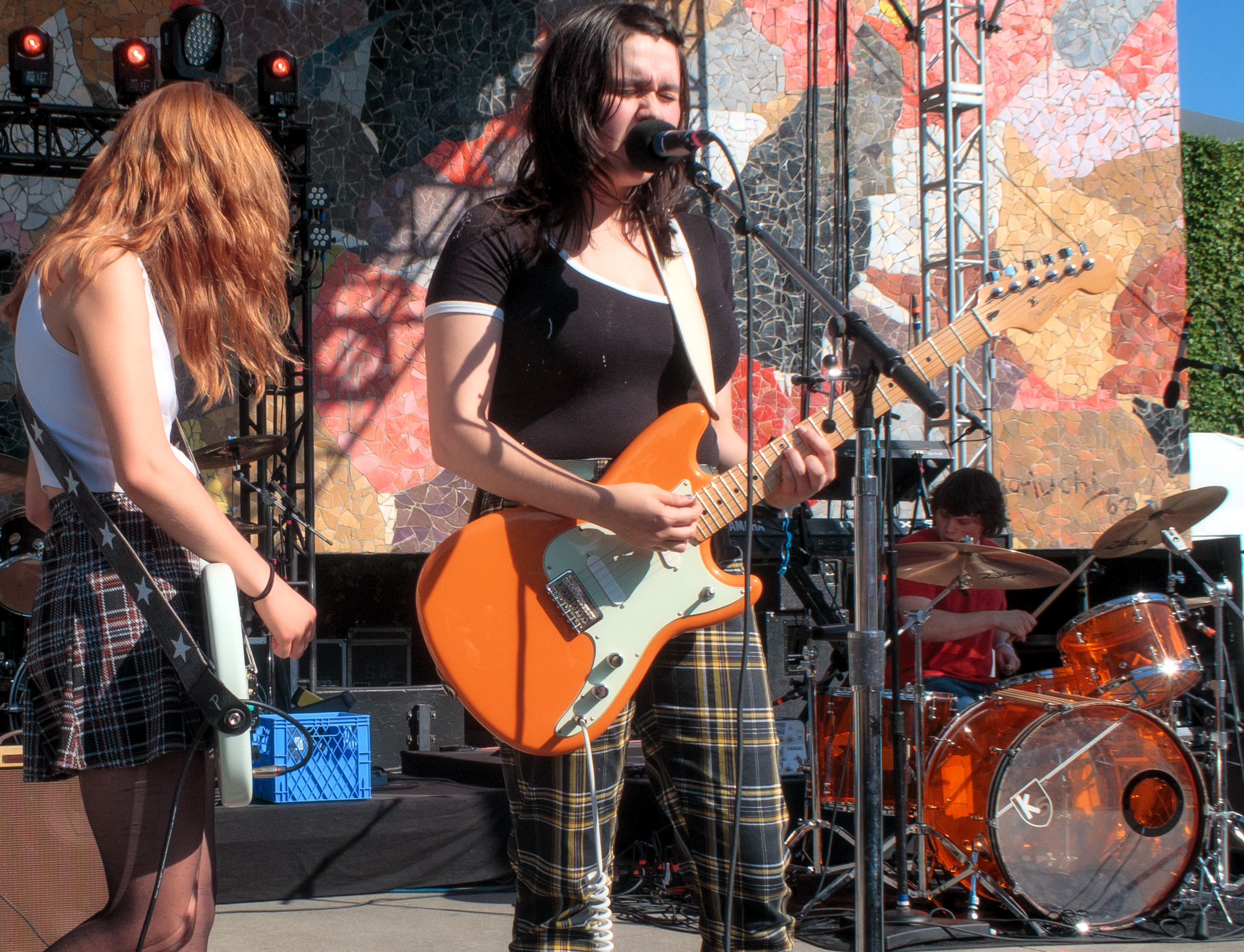
- Skating Polly performing in September 2018. From left to right: Kelli Mayo, Peyton Bighorse, and Kurtis Mayo.

Background information
- Origin: Oklahoma City, Oklahoma, United States
- Genres: Punk rock; grunge; riot grrrl; alternative rock; noise punk; garage punk; garage rock; indie pop; noise pop
- Years active: 2009–present
- Label: El Camino Media
- Members: Peyton Bighorse; Kelli Mayo; Kurtis Mayo
- Website: skatingpolly.com

Skating Polly is an American rock band formed in Oklahoma City, Oklahoma, United States, in 2009. The band was founded by multi-instrumentalist step-siblings Kelli Drew Mayo (born March 29, 2000) and Peyton Mckenna Bighorse (born July 11, 1995), who were 9 and 14 years old respectively. Kelli's brother Kurtis Lee Mayo joined the band on drums in 2017 so that Peyton and Kelli could focus on guitar and bass respectively. The band is noted for their alternating instruments among each member, poetic lyrics, intense live shows, melodic arrangements, and an eclectic array of songs that vary in style from riot grrrl to grunge to piano-based indie pop.

== Biography ==
=== Early years and Taking Over the World (2009–2011) ===
Kelli Mayo and Peyton Bighorse met after Mayo's father began dating Bighorse's mother. Bighorse is of Native American (Cheyenne and Arapaho) descent. The girls' families eventually moved in together and they began playing with various musical instruments that their parents owned. The band's first setup consisted of Bighorse on drums and Mayo on basitar, a three-stringed bass instrument most notably used by alternative rock band The Presidents of the United States of America. (Mayo's father made her a basitar after she complained that a traditional six-string guitar hurt her fingers.) The girls played their first show at their family Halloween party in 2009, with Bighorse playing simple drum beats while Mayo played basitar and improvised vocals. They named their band Skating Polly because they considered it "ironically juvenile." Mayo soon taught herself to play basic piano and drums while Bighorse taught herself guitar. They began writing songs at a furious pace, trading off instruments and lead vocal duties. They were eventually discovered by Chris Harris, owner of the small indie label Nice People Records based in Norman, Oklahoma. Harris showed Mayo's father how to utilize home recording equipment and the duo began recording their first album, Taking Over the World, in their living room.

Shortly before Taking Over the World was released on Nice People Records in November 2010, Mayo and Bighorse met Exene Cervenka of the seminal punk band X after a show in Oklahoma City. Cervenka was surprised by their extensive knowledge of punk rock music. She began corresponding with them via email and, after hearing Taking Over the World and demos of new songs, began discussing them in numerous interviews. (She stated in a Los Angeles Times interview that, if she were in charge, she would have Skating Polly play the Academy Awards.) Cervenka eventually offered to produce the band's sophomore album. In the meantime, Taking Over the World was well-received locally and the band began to perform at clubs throughout the Midwest.

=== Lost Wonderfuls (2011–2013) ===
Cervenka came to Norman, Oklahoma in December 2011 to produce what would eventually become Skating Polly's second album, Lost Wonderfuls. The entire album was recorded in four days at Hook Echo Sound studios. Blag Dahlia, lead singer of the notorious punk band Dwarves, mixed a version of the album which was set to be released by a startup label in the Spring of 2012. However, the band's deal with the label fell through after the release date was repeatedly pushed back. The band went back into the studio to work on new material. Meanwhile, Kliph Scurlock, drummer of The Flaming Lips, became a fan of the band and offered to remix Lost Wonderfuls while a new record deal was being finalized.

Lost Wonderfuls was eventually released by the Los Angeles-based label SQE Music in April 2013. Scurlock mixed the final versions of all songs except the title track. The album is a mixture of punk rock, riot grrrl, folk music and twee pop influences and was well received. The band released music videos for the songs "Placer", "Carrots", "Kick", "Lost Wonderfuls" and "Blue Obvious." Many well-known musicians and artists have praised the band, including Rosanne Cash, Sean Lennon, Django Django, The Pains of Being Pure at Heart, Ty Segall, Wayne Coyne (The Flaming Lips), Kate Nash, Wavves, Lori Barbero of Babes in Toyland and the actor Viggo Mortensen. Kliph Scurlock has perhaps been the band's most ardent supporter, as he can be seen wearing their T-shirt at various Flaming Lips concerts such as Freak Night, OKC Zoo Amp 2012, and Indianapolis 2013, in the documentary Big Star: Nothing Can Hurt Me, in a Super Bowl commercial for Hyundai, and in the Gruff Rhys American Interior documentary.

=== Fuzz Steilacoom (2013–2015) ===
In the fall of 2013, the band traveled to Olympia, WA to record their third album, Fuzz Steilacoom with K Records founder Calvin Johnson. The album was released in spring 2014. Allmusic noted that the band had "subdued some of their twee-pop tendencies in favor of a raw, raucous, and more immediate sound" and praised the album as "brimming with creative wit, youthful abandon, emotional fervor, and classic punk spirit." Several songs received airplay on college radio throughout the U.S. Rodney Bingenheimer of KROQ began playing songs from the album on his influential Rodney on the ROQ program. The band toured throughout 2014 to support the record. The album was co-produced by Allan Vest, of Oklahoma indie rock band Starlight Mints, and Chris Harris. Dub Narcotic Studio engineer Bob Schwenkler co-produced one song on the record, "Dead Friends." The album was named after Steilacoom Road in Olympia, WA (Sleater-Kinney is also named after a road near Olympia), where the duo stayed while recording the album; the word "fuzz" was added because Skating Polly felt like the most common element among all the songs was that they sounded loud, distorted, and fuzzy.

=== The Big Fit, The Make It All Show, and addition of Kurtis Mayo (2015–present) ===
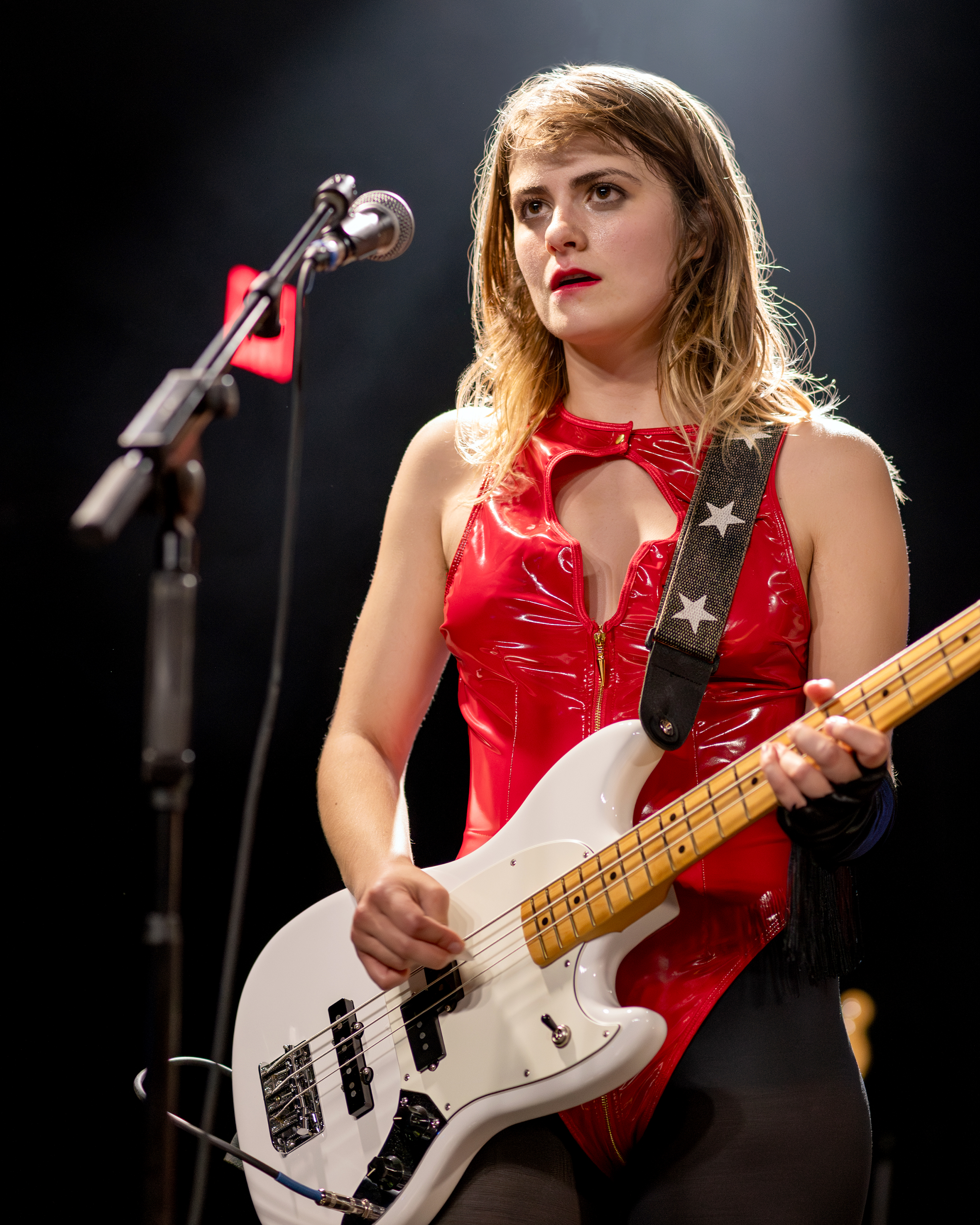
Skating Polly (2024)

In 2015, Skating Polly toured in Europe in support of Babes in Toyland. In the fall of 2015 the band moved to Tacoma, Washington. The band spent the fall of 2015 recording The Big Fit in Lawrence, KS with Kliph Scurlock. The album was released in spring 2016 and received acclaim, particularly from the UK press. Kerrang! described the album as "overflowing with power, passion and songwriting excellence" and Paste deemed the album "one of the strongest punk records in recent memory." Shirley Manson of Garbage also praised the album in the press. On January 27 of 2017, the band announced on their Instagram the addition of Kurtis Mayo, the girls' brother, on drums to expand the band's full potential. The band collaborated with Louise Post and Nina Gordon of Veruca Salt for the three song EP New Trick, released in 2017. In 2018, Skating Polly released their fifth studio album, The Make It All Show.

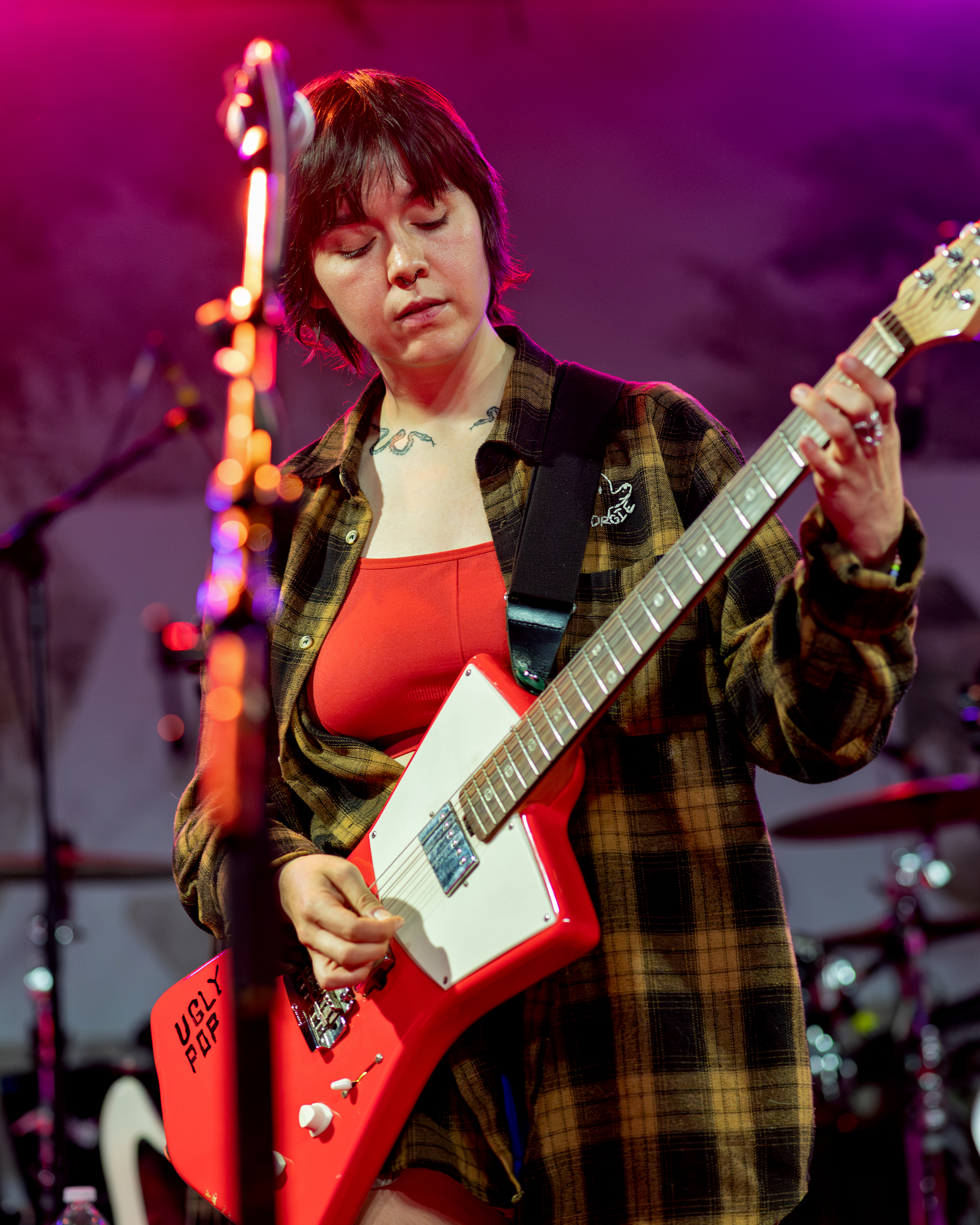
Skating Polly (2024)

Since the release of Lost Wonderfuls, the band has garnered a considerable amount of airplay on indie and college radio stations across the United States and in certain places in Europe, particularly France. The band has toured extensively across the U.S., providing support to Deerhoof, The Flaming Lips, Band of Horses, Mike Watt, Kate Nash, The Pains of Being Pure at Heart, Emily Wells, Generationals, Holly Golightly, and Wavves. The band played 7 shows at SXSW in 2013 and recorded two Daytrotter sessions.

Skating Polly's song "A Little Late" appeared during the credits of Viggo Mortensen's 2020 film Falling. The members of the band attended 2020 Sundance Film Festival where Falling premiered.

Skating Polly's sixth album, Chaos County Line, was released on June 23, 2023.

== Influences and comparisons ==
Skating Polly is often compared to bands associated with the riot grrrl movement such as Bikini Kill and Babes in Toyland, but many songs bring to mind artists such as Kimya Dawson and Beat Happening. The band, however, denies being a part of riot grrrl. Skating Polly does not have a front person in the traditional sense, as both Mayo and Bighorse typically write and provide lead vocals for their own songs. The band is known to cover other artists and has put its spin on songs by Spacemen 3, Neutral Milk Hotel, Dead Boys, Portishead, Perfume Genius, The Left Banke, Ol' Dirty Bastard, M.I.A., AC/DC, Nina Nastasia and Syd Barrett.

== Members ==
Current members

- Kelli Mayo – lead and backing vocals, bass, guitar, keyboards, drums (2009–present)
- Peyton Bighorse – guitar, lead and backing vocals, bass, drums, keyboards (2009–present)
- Kurtis Mayo – drums, guitar, backing vocals (2017–present)

Timeline

== Discography ==
=== Albums ===
- Taking Over the World (Nice People, 2010)
- Lost Wonderfuls (SQE Music, 2013)
- Fuzz Steilacoom (Chap Stereo, 2014)
- The Big Fit (Chap Stereo, 2016)
- The Make It All Show (El Camino Media, 2018)
- Chaos County Line (El Camino Media, 2023)

=== EPs ===
- Ugly Pop (2016)
- New Trick (feat. Louise Post and Nina Gordon) (2017)

=== Live releases ===
- Skating Polly on Audiotree Live (EP) (2018)

=== Singles ===
Title	Year	Album
"Alabama Movies" / "A Little Late"	2014	Fuzz Steilacoom
"Benny Once Told Me"*	2015	Non-album single
"Nothing More Than a Body"*	2015	The Big Fit
"Oddie Moore"*	2016	The Big Fit
"Pretective Boy (The Hey Mr. Version)"*	2016	Non-album singles
"Chipper on Ezastar" (split with "Spectacle D'Horreur" by Qui)	2016	Non-album singles
"Hail Mary"* (feat. Louise Post and Nina Gordon)	2017	New Trick
"Louder in Outer Space"* (feat. Louise Post and Nina Gordon)	2017	New Trick
"Queen for a Day"* (feat. Exene Cervenka)	2018	The Make It All Show
"Camelot"*	2018	The Make It All Show
"Hollywood Factory"*	2018	The Make It All Show
"Play House" / "Flyer"	2019	Non-album single
"Hickey King"*	2023	Chaos County Line
"I'm Sorry for Always Apologizing"*	2023	Chaos County Line
"Send a Priest"*	2023	Chaos County Line
"Krobus"*	2026	Non-album singles
"Grannies"*	2026	Non-album singles
* Single was only released digitally

=== Music Videos ===
- "Carrots" (2013)
- "Blue Obvious" (2013)
- "Kick" (2013)
- "Placer" (2013)
- "Lost Wonderfuls" (2013)
- "Alabama Movies" (2014)
- "Ugly" (2014)
- "A Little Late" (2014)
- "Van Gogh" (2015)
- "Nothing More Than a Body" (2015)
- "Perfume for Now" (2016)
- "Pretective Boy" (2016)
- "Hey Sweet" (2016)
- "Stop Digging" (2016)
- "For the View" (2016)
- "Picker of His Words" (2016)
- "Across the Caves" (2016)
- "Morning Dew" (2016)
- "Oddie Moore" (2017)
- "Arms and Opinions" (2017)
- "Cosmetic Skull" (2017)
- "Hail Mary" (2017)
- "Louder in Outer Space" (2017)
- "Queen for a Day" (2018)
- "Hollywood Factory" (2018)
- "Little Girl Blue and the Battle Envy" (2018)
- "Camelot" (2018)
- "Free Will at Ease" (2018)
- "They're Cheap (I'm Free)" (2018)
- "Play House" (2019)
- "Classless Act" (2019)
- "Don't Leave Me Gravity" (2021)
- "Hickey King" (2023)
- "I'm Sorry for Always Apologizing" (2023)
- "Tiger at the Drugstore" (2023)
- "Rabbit Food" (2024)
