= Jessica Chapnik Kahn =

Argentine Australian singer-songwriter, actress and writer

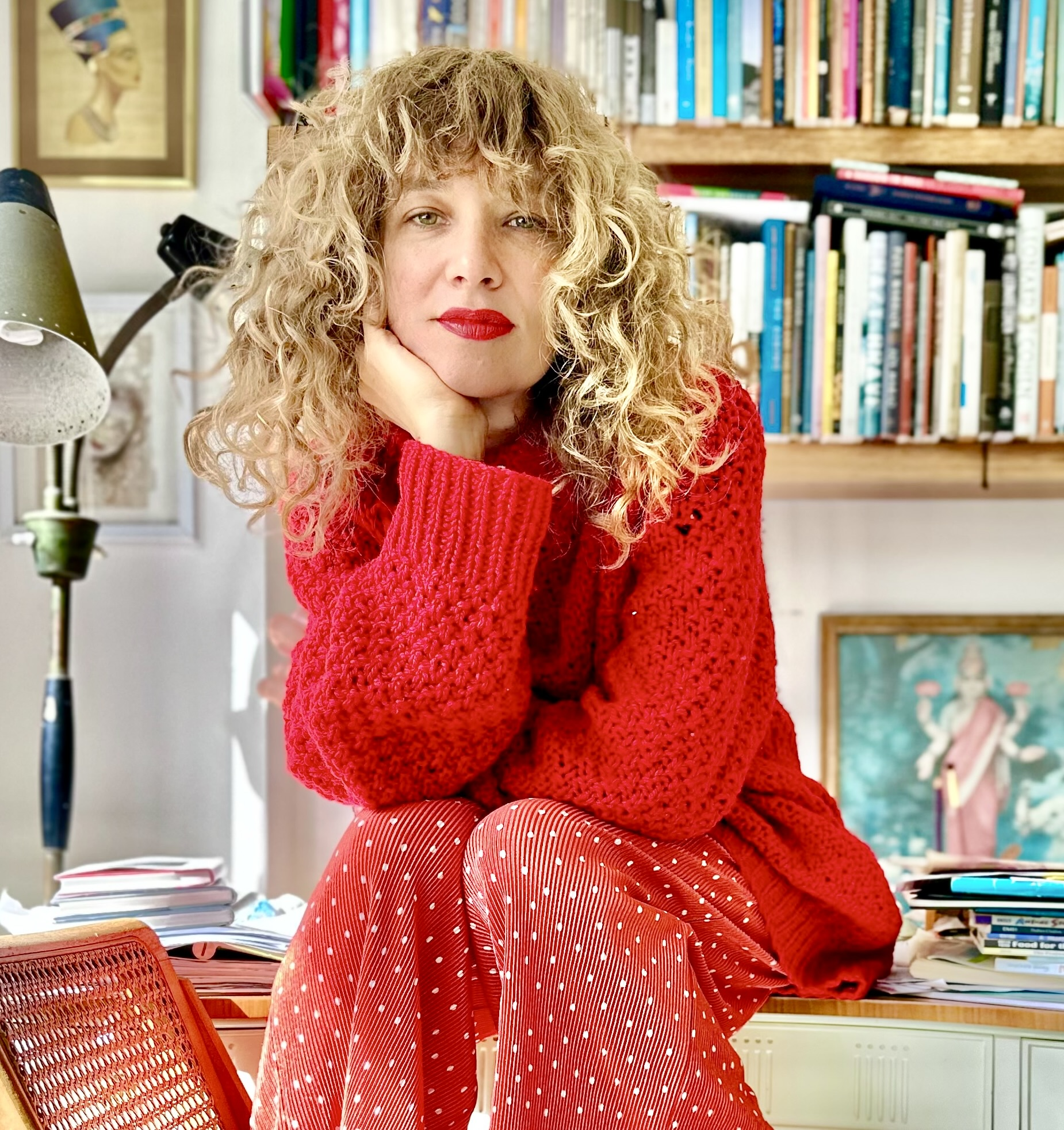
Jessica Chapnik Kahn in 2025

Jessica Chapnik Kahn is an Argentine Australian poet, singer-songwriter, actress and writer. Her solo music is released under the moniker Appleonia. She is also known for her role as Sam Tolhurst/Holden in the Australian television drama Home and Away (2006–08).

== Early life ==
Chapnik Kahn was born in Buenos Aires, Argentina. She immigrated to Sydney, Australia along with her family when she was five years old. On arriving to Australia, speaking no English, they lived in an immigrant hostel for one year. She was brought up in an Argentine Spanish-speaking home (she is fluent in Spanish). She is of Jewish and Italian descent and was raised with a blend of religious and cultural influences. After high school, Chapnik Kahn attended the University of New South Wales in Sydney and graduated with a degree in theatre and film and sociology.

== Career ==
=== Music career ===
Chapnik Kahn formed her first band at the age of 17. After one year, the band dismantled and she toured nationally and internationally playing keyboards and singing in the bands of artists and bands such as Sarah Blasko, Old Man River, and the Kahn Brothers. While touring, Chapnik Kahn met musician Ben Lee and the two later began collaborating on music projects.

In 2008 Chapnik Kahn recorded the soundtrack for the Australian film The Square, directed by Nash Edgerton. All songs were written and produced by Ben Lee, and sung by Chapnik Kahn. The album was nominated for an Australian Recording Industry Association (ARIA) Award for "Best Original Soundtrack".

Following this album, Chapnik Kahn re-invented her solo persona as Appleonia.

In 2013, Chapnik Kahn teamed with musician Nadav Kahn and scored the film Despite the Gods, a documentary directed by Penny Vozniak which closely follows the journey of director Jennifer Chambers Lynch as she makes her film Hisss in India. The soundtrack was released in 2013 and features the song "She is the Sun" which Chapnik Kahn sang with Craig Nicholls from The Vines.

Chapnik Kahn again collaborated with Ben Lee, co-writing and co-producing his album Ayahuasca: Welcome to the Work, released in April 2013. The album is a sonic documentation of her and Lee's experiences with the South American healing medicine, ayahuasca.

In 2014 she released her album OH, which was recorded over a few continents and over several years. It features the handiwork of several collaborators including Dntel, Ian Ball and Nadav Kahn.

In 2022, Chapnik Kahn performed a rendition of the folk song The Water Is Wide with her husband, musician Nadav Kahn, for the closing moments and end credits of the Australian film Everything in Between.

=== Acting career ===
Chapnik Kahn trained as an actress in New York City for two years at the Atlantic Theater Company Acting School, which was founded by playwright David Mamet. While living in New York, she acted in a string of plays, and on returning to Sydney she continued working in theatre. In 2006 she joined Australian TV drama Home and Away, playing Sam Tolhurst/Holden. The role was originally a three-month contract, but was extended to almost two years due to the storyline's popularity. Chapnik Kahn later had a guest role in the American adventure/fantasy series Legend of the Seeker, playing Anna Brighton. The episodes (episode 12: "Home" and episode 14: "Hartland") were broadcast in early 2009 on Disney-ABC Domestic Television. In 2009 she also starred in the Spanish-speaking short film Amanecer (Daybreak), directed by Alvaro D. Ruiz, a film that won several awards in Latin film festivals worldwide.

Jessica has directed and co-directed music videos for her Appleonia albums. In 2013 she directed a music video for Ben Lee's song "On My Knees".

=== Writing career ===
Chapnik Kahn published her first children's book in 2018 called Lenny and the Ants, illustrated by Australian artist Matthew Martin. In 2019, she released a collection of poems and drawings called MADRE, inspired by the birth of her son. In 2020, she co-wrote the biography A Repurposed Life which was longlisted for an ABIA Award for Biography Book of the Year in 2021. In 2025, she was a featured speaker and poet at TEDxSydney, and her collaborative work The Fire Always Says Yes had its world premiere at the Sydney Opera House later that year.

== Personal life ==
In 2011 Chapnik Kahn married musician Nadav Kahn, formerly of art rock band Gelbison. In 2016 their son Lev was born, followed by their daughter Shemi in 2020.

== Awards and nominations ==
=== ARIA Music Awards ===
The ARIA Music Awards is an annual awards ceremony held by the Australian Recording Industry Association. They commenced in 1987.

Year	Nominee / work	Award	Result	Ref.
ARIA Music Awards of 2008	The Square (with Ben Lee)	Best Original Soundtrack, Cast or Show Album	Nominated	
