= Lara Meyerratken =

Australian multi-instrumentalist musician and composer

Lara Meyerratken is an Australian multi-instrumentalist musician and composer who currently resides in Los Angeles, California. Meyerratken is most commonly associated with her longtime collaborator Ben Lee.

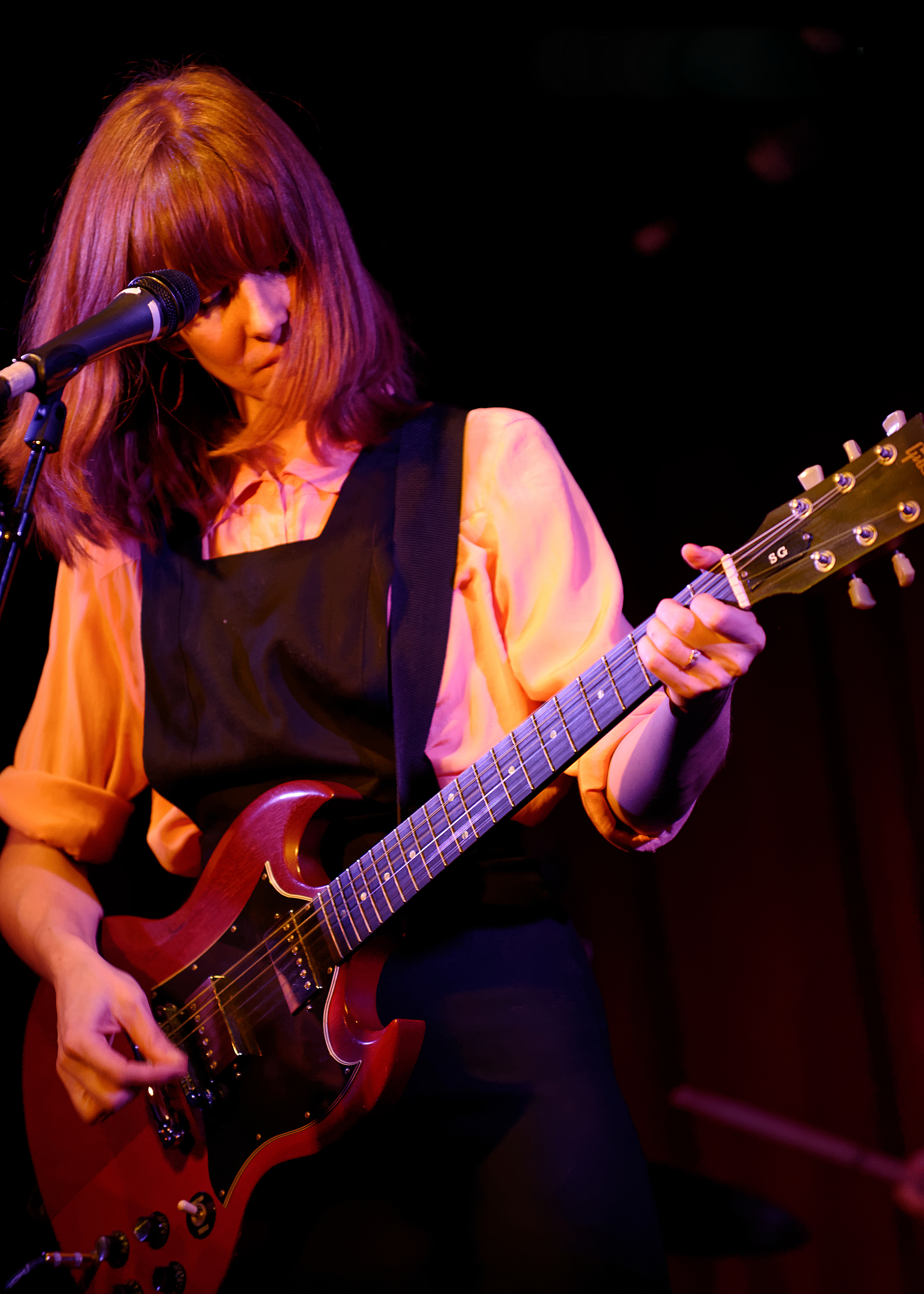

Meyerratken is a notable session musician and songwriter. Artists she has performed or recorded with included Luscious Jackson, Crooked Fingers, Luna, Via Tania, Sneeze, Clem Snide and Nada Surf. In addition to her work as a performer and side artist, Meyerratken has composed a number of pieces for commercials, films and television. She was the musical director for the Cannes "Best Original Music" Lion Award winner for Match.com in 2010, and her original music has appeared in commercials for Kellogg's and the Japanese skincare line Oranine.

Her song "Hero" was included in the soundtrack of the 2005 movie The Baxter and her song "The Things You Lost" makes an appearance in the 2011 film Our Idiot Brother. In 2005 Meyerratken was the winner of the ARIA Cover Art award. Most recently, Meyerratken composed the music for the Frédéric Planchon-directed Curious George spot for Google.

Meyerratken performs her own music under the name El May. Her self-titled debut album was self-released in 2010, some songs of which appeared in television shows like Pretty Little Liars and The Lying Game. She released a cover of Small Black's "Pleasant Experience."
