= Blitzen Trapper discography =

- Studio albums: 10
- EPs: 5
- Live albums: 3
- Singles: 16
- Music videos: 18
- As Garmonbozia: 9

This is the discography of Blitzen Trapper, an American rock band, centered in Portland, Oregon. Blitzen Trapper has released records steadily since 2003, and is known for their brand of folk/countrypolitan rock infused with pop sensibilities, and a variety of styles and influences including country funk, Americana, and psychedelia. Prior to forming Blitzen Trapper, the band toured under the name Garmonbozia and self-released nine non-commercial albums under that name. The lineup of Blitzen Trapper remained almost unchanged over the majority of their studio and live albums. Former member Drew Laughery departed the band prior to 2011's American Goldwing, while three more founding members stayed until late 2019. Two others, Eric Earley and Brian Adrian Koch, have played for the band consistently since its founding.

Blitzen Trapper's most commercially successful period occurred between 2008's Furr and 2011's American Goldwing, during which time the band's studio albums appeared on the Billboard 200. However, their move from label SubPop to Vagrant Records in 2013 preceded their first charting single on a Billboard chart: "Thirsty Man," from the album VII, which went to #29 on the Adult Alternative Songs chart.

Overall, Blitzen Trapper's discography consists of ten studio albums, three live albums, five extended plays, fourteen singles and eighteen music videos.

== Albums ==
=== Studio albums ===
List of studio albums, with selected chart positions and certifications
Title	Album details	Peak chart positions						Certifications
Title	Album details	US	US Alt.	US Rock	US Folk	GER	NZ	Certifications
Blitzen Trapper	Released: November 25, 2003 (US); Label: LidKerCow; Formats: CD	—	—	—	—	—	—	
Field Rexx	Released: November 23, 2004 (US); Label: LidKerCow; Formats: CD, digital download	—	—	—	—	—	—	
Wild Mountain Nation	Released: June 12, 2007 (US); Label: Sub Pop; Formats: CD, digital download	—	—	—	—	—	—	
Furr	Released: September 23, 2008 (US); Label: Sub Pop; Formats: CD, LP, digital download	189	—	—	—	—	—	
Destroyer of the Void	Released: June 8, 2010 (US); Label: Sub Pop; Formats: CD, LP, digital download	88	18	25	—	—	—	
American Goldwing	Released: September 13, 2011 (US); Label: Sub Pop; Formats: CD, LP, digital download	104	20		—	—	—	
VII	Released: September 30, 2013 (US); Label: Vagrant; Formats: CD, LP, digital download	—	—	—	11	—	—	
All Across This Land	Released: October 2, 2015 (US); Label: Vagrant; Formats: CD, LP, digital download	—	—	—	13	—	—	
Wild and Reckless	Released: November 3, 2017 (US); Label: Vagrant; Formats: CD, LP, digital download	—	—	—	—	—	—	
Holy Smokes Future Jokes	Released: September 25, 2020 (US); Label: Yep Roc; Formats: CD, LP, digital download	—	—	—	—	—	—	
100's of 1000's, Millions of Billions	Released: May 17, 2024 (US); Label: Yep Roc; Formats: CD, LP, digital download	—	—	—	—	—	—	
"—" denotes a recording that did not chart or was not released in that territory.

=== Live albums ===
List of live albums, with selected chart positions and certifications
Title	Album details	Peak chart positions						Certifications
Title	Album details	US	US Alt.	US Rock	US Folk	GER	NZ	Certifications
Live In Portland	Released: December 17, 2014 (US); Label: LidKerCow; Formats: digital download	—	—	—	—	—	—	
Live Harvest	Released: April 18, 2015 (US); Label: Vagrant; Formats: Vinyl record	—	—	—	—	—	—	
Live at Third Man Records	Released: September 2, 2016 (US); Label: Third Man; Formats: Vinyl record	—	—	—	—	—	—	
"—" denotes a recording that did not chart or was not released in that territory.

== Extended plays ==
List of recordings, with selected chart positions.
Title	EP details	US Heatseekers
Blitzen Trapper Advance Album Sampler Promo Thingy	Released: 2004; Label: LidKerCow; Format: CD	—
Cool Love No. 1	Released: 2008; Label: LidKerCow; Format: CD	—
Black River Killer	Released: 2009; Label: SubPop; Format: CD	22
Mystery and Wonder	Released: 2016; Label: Vagrant Records; Format: digital download	—
Kid's Album!	Released: 2018; Label: LidKerCow; Format: vinyl record	—
"—" denotes a recording that did not chart or was not released in that territory.
