= Live at Third Man Records (Blitzen Trapper album) =

Live album by Blitzen Trapper
- Released: September 1, 2016
- Genre: Rock
- Length: 45:00
- Label: Third Man Records

Blitzen Trapper chronology
| All Across This Land (2015) | Live at Third Man Records (2016) | Wild and Reckless (2017) |

Live at Third Man Records is the third live album from the Portland, Oregon-based rock band Blitzen Trapper, and the second featuring exclusively band-written work (the cover album Live Harvest included only live versions of Neil Young songs). Blitzen Trapper performed the tracks live on the Blue Room Stage on March 16, 2016; the recording was cut direct-to-acetate on Third Man's 1955 Scully lathe and released on 12" vinyl record September 2, 2016.

Said lead singer Eric Earley of the session, "Third Man has it dialed in, hard rock Never Never Land ... Super fun crew over there.” Pop-culture site Paste announced the album with a preview of one of the tracks, "Lonesome Angel."

== Track listing and song selection ==
The majority of tracks selected for this recording are versions of songs from the band's most recent studio release, All Across This Land: "Rock and Roll (Was Made For You)," "Nights Were Made For Love," "Cadillac Road," "Love Grow Cold," "Lonesome Angel," and "All Across The Land." However, the band also performed "Texaco" from Blitzen Trapper, "Love the Way You Walk Away" from American Goldwing, and "Black River Killer" and "Furr" from the album Furr. Only these last two songs are repeats from the band's other live record featuring their music, Live in Portland. Between the two live records, the only studio albums not represented are Field Rexx and Destroyer of the Void.

All songs written by Eric Earley.

| No. | Title | Length |
|---|---|---|
| 1. | "Rock and Roll (Was Made For You)" | 4:39 |
| 2. | "Nights Were Made For Love" | 3:52 |
| 3. | "Texaco" | 3:46 |
| 4. | "Cadillac Road" | 4:49 |
| 5. | "Love Grow Cold" | 4:54 |
| 6. | "Lonesome Angel" | 4:53 |
| 7. | "Black River Killer" | 3:50 |
| 8. | "Love the Way You Walk Away" | 4:03 |
| 9. | "Furr" | 4:53 |
| 10. | "All Across This Land" | 4:37 |
