= Lojinx discography =

The following is a list of releases on the British indie label Lojinx. Catalog numbers begin with "LJX" followed by a three digit sequential number and format designation (e.g. CD, LP, V7, etc.), as printed on every physical release. This list is sorted by catalog number and is mostly chronological. The release date given is for the UK, other European release dates may vary.

Catalogue number	Artist	Title	Release date	Format
LJX003	Farrah	Tongue Tied	11 July 2005	CDS
LJX005	Farrah	Me Too	1 November 2004	CD
LJX006	The Bad Machines	Telling Lies	6 June 2005	CD
LJX007	Montana	Bubblegum Love (With Extra Love)	1 January 2006	CD
LJX009	Montana	Starsign: Tarantula	26 March 2007	CD
LJX010	Farrah	Cut Out And Keep	2 July 2007	CD
LJX011	Henrik	Faction	3 November 2008	CD
LJX012	Henrik	This Time	22 September 2008	D
LJX013	The Wellingtons	Heading North For The Winter	3 November 2008	CD
LJX014	The Wellingtons	Song For Kim / Freak Out	22 October 2008	V7
LJX016	Various	Christmas Present	1 December 2010	D
LJX017	Caroline Lost	Stars	9 January 2009	D
LJX018	Nate Campany & The Serenade	The Only Bridge I Need	1 June 2009	CD
LJX019	Farrah	Swings and Roundabouts	26 April 2010	D
LJX021	Farrah	Farrah	17 May 2010	CD
LJX022	Josh Fix	This Town Is Starting To Make Me Angry	14 September 2009	D
LJX023	Kim Richey	Wreck Your Wheels	17 May 2010	CD
LJX024	Tracy Bonham	Masts Of Manhatta	13 July 2010	CD
LJX026	Bleu	Four	25 October 2010	CD
LJX020	Henrik	Try Me	20 December 2010	D
LJX027	The Click Five	TCV	30 May 2011	CD
LJX028	Farrah	Scarborough	9 May 2011	D
LJX029	Fountains Of Wayne	Sky Full of Holes	1 August 2011	CD, V12
LJX030	Fountains Of Wayne	Richie and Ruben	13 June 2011	V7
LJX031	Fountains Of Wayne	Someone's Gonna Break Your Heart	18 July 2011	V7
LJX033	Butch Walker & The Black Widows	Summer of '89	11 July 2011	D
LJX032	Butch Walker	The Spade	29 August 2011	CD, LP
LJX034	Ben Lee	Deeper Into Dream	10 October 2011	CD
LJX035	Bill DeMain	Extended Stay	20 February 2012	D
LJX036	David Myhr	Soundshine	26 March 2012	CD
LJX038	Pugwash	The Olympus Sound	16 April 2012	CD, LP
LJX039	Young Hines	Give Me My Change	7 May 2012	CD, LP
LJX040	Brendan Benson	What Kind Of World	23 April 2012	CD, LP
LJX041	Farrah	Bees & Honey	2 April 2012 (Japan)	BOX (Box Set)
LJX042	Brendan Benson	Concert Los Angeles	16 April 2012	D
LJX043	Brendan Benson	What Kind Of World (single)	21 April 2012	V7
LJX044	Mike Viola	Acousto De Perfecto		CD, D
LJX045	Ken Stringfellow	Danzig In The Moonlight		CD, D
LJX047	Kim Richey	Little Record 1 & 2		D
LJX048	The Lost Brothers	The Passing Of The Night		CD, D, LP
LJX049	Tsar	The Dark Stuff EP		D
LJX050	Pugwash	Here We Go 'Round Again EP		V10
LJX052	The Dark Flowers	Radioland		CD, D
LJX053	The Lost Brothers (feat. Bill Ryder-Jones)	St. Christopher		CDS, D
LJX054	Brendan Benson	Swimming / Oh My Love		V7
LJX055	Kim Richey	Thorn In My Heart		CD, D
LJX058	They Might Be Giants	Nanobots		CD, D
LJX060	Ben Lee	Ayahuasca: Welcome to the Work		CD, D
LJX061	Future Monarchs	Weird Weather		CD, D
LJX062	Blitzen Trapper	VII		LP, CD, D
LJX063	Brendan Benson	You Were Right		LP, CD, D
LJX064	Butch Walker	Peachtree Battle		V12, D
LJX069	Sally Seltmann	Hey Daydreamer		CD, D
LJX070	Nina Persson	Animal Heart		LP, CD, D
LJX074	Ken Stringfellow	Paradiso In The Moonlight	July 2014	LPx2
LJX075	Kim Richey & Gareth Dunlop	The Nashville Sessions	May 2014	CD, Digital
LJX076	They Might Be Giants	Idlewild	May 2014	CD, LP, Digital
LJX080	Taylor Locke	Time Stands Still		CD, LP, Digital
LJX081	The Lost Brothers	New Songs of Dawn and Dust	September 2014	CD, LP, Digital
LJX083	Butch Walker	Out Of Focus	June 2014	DVD
LJX084	Marshall Crenshaw	Move Now	November 2014	V12, Digital
LJX085	El May	The Other Person Is You	September 2014	CD, LP, Digital
LJX086	Hannah Schneider	Red Lines	October 2014	CD, LP, Digital
LJX087	Nina Persson	Animal Crossbreed		V12
LJX090	Butch Walker	Afraid of Ghosts	February 2015	CD, LP, Digital
LJX091	Butch Walker	Chrissie Hynde	December 2014	V7
LJX092	The Lost Brothers	Little Angel	December 2014	Digital
LJX094	David Myhr	Veronica / Oh Susie	March 2015	Digital
LJX095	They Might Be Giants	Glean	February 2015	CD, LP, Digital
LJX096	Fred Abbott	Adrenaline Shot	February 2015	Digital
LJX097	Fred Abbott	Serious Poke	July 2015	CD, LP, Digital
LJX098	Blitzen Trapper	All Across This Land	October 2015	CD, LP, Digital
LJX101	They Might Be Giants	Why?	November 2015	CD, LP, Digital
LJX102	Blitzen Trapper	Mystery and Wonder	Jan 2016	Digital
LJX103	The Posies	Solid States	April 2016	CD, LP, Digital
LJX104	They Might Be Giants	Phone Power	March 2016	CD, LP, Digital
LJX107	Butch Walker	Stay Gold	August 2016	CD, LP, Digital
LJX110	Blitzen Trapper	Wild and Reckless	November 2017	Digital
LJX111	Pugwash	Silverlake	December 2017	CD, LP, Digital
LJX112	Astral Drive	Astral Drive	July 2018	CD, LP, Digital
LJX113	They Might Be Giants	I Like Fun	January 2017	CD, LP, Digital
LJX115	David Myhr	Lucky Day	May 2018	CD, LP, Digital
LJX116	Pugwash	Without You	May 2018	V7
LJX120	Astral Drive	Astral Drive (aka "Green")	August 2019	Digital
