= Boom (Garmonbozia album) =

Studio album by Garmonbozia
- Released: 2002
- Recorded: 2002
- Genre: Experimental rock, psychedelic rock
- Length: 22:03

Garmonbozia chronology
The Omnibus & the Baker's Man (2001)	Boom (2002)	R/L (2002)

Boom is one of the albums the band Garmonbozia recorded and distributed at concerts before changing their name to Blitzen Trapper and releasing albums commercially. Boom contains a very early version of the song, "Sadie"; a more polished version of the song would later close Blitzen Trapper's Destroyer of the Void album in 2010.

== Track listing ==
No.	Title	Length
1.	"Traviesita"	:41
2.	"Cut Out His Tongue"	2:00
3.	"Chet and Andy"	1:03
4.	"Frozen Solid"	:33
5.	"Zoo Shoes"	:54
6.	"Sadie"	2:40
7.	"Soon"	2:05
8.	"Llorando Vaya"	1:52
9.	"The Butcher and the Cleaver's Sheath"	1:59
10.	"Linda"	2:15
11.	"Crystal Ball"	4:01
12.	"Brown and Root"	1:42
13.	"Drew's Theme"	:54
14.	"1979"	2:04
