= VII (Blitzen Trapper album) =

Studio album by Blitzen Trapper
- Released: September 30, 2013
- Genres: Alternative country, country rap
- Length: 43:35
- Labels: Vagrant Records (US), Lojinx (Europe)

Blitzen Trapper chronology
American Goldwing (2011)	VII (2013)	Live in Portland (2014)

VII is the seventh studio album by American alternative country band Blitzen Trapper. Described on the band's official site as "somewhat experimental ... a futuristic hip-hop/country-rock hybrid", and by lead singer and songwriter Eric Earley as "hillbilly gangster", VII was the first record Blitzen Trapper released with their new labels, Vagrant (US) and Lojinx (UK). The song "Thirsty Man" was released as the album's only single, hitting #29 on the Adult Alternative Songs Billboard chart.

== Conception ==
VII took many writing and stylistic departures from its predecessor, 2011's country-rock American Goldwing. Songwriter Eric Earley explains, "I get bored. I like to move things in a new direction ... I’m always writing, and if you’re always writing things are going to change. You’re going to try things out. And that’s going to make its way into the music.” Earley cites his influences on the album as diverse as John Cale, Townes Van Zant, the Wu-Tang Clan and Waylon Jennings. "Townes probably is the biggest influence on the lyrics. His lyrics can be pretty strange. You don’t know what he’s talking about sometimes. I like that," Earley stated. "It's just me wanting to mix that dark, gangster vibe with the kind of music I grew up listening to and see if it can kind of make sense ... It seems to work. It's a good vehicle for telling stories, too."

== Reception ==
VII was well received by critics. An enthusiastic review by Paste magazine calls the record "Blitzen Trapper’s strongest album to date, with years of musical experimentation having come together in the band’s own mad-scientist brand of cosmic Americana ... With each record, Earley’s writing grows more vivid, closer to the short-story-in-a-song realm of the Drive-By Truckers, Vic Chesnutt and Jason Molina at his most direct ... Musically, Blitzen Trapper is less idiosyncratic but no less unique."

Pitchfork referred to the album as "something like a return to form," stating that,"Blitzen Trapper are finding their way back, as it turns out to somewhere between Nation and Furr. The harmonica bleats, walking bass line, and vivid imagery are familiar, but it’s still good to hear the band fire up their Stevie Wonder stomp again." AllMusic praised the album for "[adding] elements of countrypolitan and suburban hip-hop into the pot, seasoning [Blitzen Trapper's] already heady brew with a little North Mississippi Allstars and Odelay-era Beck, especially on cuts like 'Feel the Chill' and 'Ever Loved Once,' resulting in a sort of cosmic, high-def honky tonk that for the most part proves tasty, injecting some much needed brevity into windy frontman Eric Earley's colorful yet often perfunctory tales of sin and redemption."

== Daytrotter Sessions ==
Daytrotter, a website for the recording studio Horseshack, hosts live acoustic recording sessions with popular indie music acts; to date, Blitzen Trapper has appeared on the Daytrotter Sessions more than any other artist "on the planet." In an essay accompanying the session centering on VII, founder Sean Moeller said, "There is an unbearable sadness that accompanies much of what they do, though there's no denying that even in the perkiest of moments, the band is sweet on that sadness and never thinks of it as a cur. They never want to outrun it, but are more interested in seeing what that sadness takes with its coffee and how it lies its head to rest at night." The band played four songs live in the studio: "Faces of You," "Thirsty Man," "Valley of Death," and "Texaco"; all but the final are from VII.

== Track listing ==
No.	Title	Length
1.	"Feel the Chill"	3:36
2.	"Shine On"	3:13
3.	"Ever Loved Once"	3:43
4.	"Thirsty Man"	3:41
5.	"Valley of Death"	3:27
6.	"Oregon Geography"	2:38
7.	"Neck Tatts, Cadillacs"	2:34
8.	"Earth (Fever Called Love)"	4:38
9.	"Drive on Up"	3:47
10.	"Heart Attack"	4:36
11.	"Faces of You"	4:06
12.	"Don't Be a Stranger"	3:24
