= Live Harvest =

Live album by Blitzen Trapper
- Released: April 18, 2015
- Recorded: Doug Fir Lounge
- Genre: Rock
- Length: 36:00
- Label: Vagrant Records
- Producers: Eric Earley, Michael Van Pelt, & Paul Gold

Blitzen Trapper chronology
Live In Portland (2014)	Live Harvest (2015)	All Across This Land (2015)

On April 18, 2015, Blitzen Trapper released Live Harvest for Record Store Day. Recorded on October 17 at the Doug Fir Lounge in Portland, Oregon at the end of the band's VII tour, Live Harvest is a song-for-song interpretation of Neil Young's 1972 album Harvest. The album was released as a 180-gram vinyl LP with a download card. The band launched a short tour in support of the record, including stops at several City Winery locations in New York, Nashville, and Chicago, in which they played Harvest in its entirety, as well as Blitzen Trapper songs.

Blitzen Trapper's interest in Neil Young goes back before the band's inception: ""All of us have disparate tastes which comes out in our own stuff, but Neil Young is a common thread that’s run through all of our lives," bassist Michael Van Pelt stated, "I remember listening to Harvest on cassette in Eric’s mom’s car back in high school ... It’s a special record, and it gets pretty dark in spots, too. Darker than I remember." Lead singer Eric Earley elaborated, "I think we all knew the record before we even tried to play it. It’s one of those records that takes us to that place of comfort and nostalgia like The Dukes Of Hazzard or a Chevy Impala. It just feels good to play it."

Though the band had long been familiar with the original album, the conception for the cover album was spontaneous. Van Pelt said of Earley, "Eric just came in one day and said, ‘Let’s do Harvest at the Doug Fir,' ... We were all like, ‘Yeah!'" Unusually, Earley doesn't sing lead on every song on the album; keyboardist Marty Marquis - who has sung lead on the band's song "Jericho" - performs a stripped-down version of "A Man Needs a Maid," while drummer Brian Adrian Koch performs lead duties for the first time on a Blitzen Trapper record, on "The Needle and the Damage Done."

Website Stereogum teased the release with an exclusive premiere of the song, "Heart of Gold," eight days before the album's release. Stereogum called the track a "graceful rendition," stating that, "the band immaculately reconstructed [the song] from familiar components — the introductory wavering harmonica line, the chorus’ soaring slide guitar, and even the timid barn-door drumming ... It feels good to hear it."

== Reception ==
Review site PopMatters gave the record seven out of ten stars, stating, "Blitzen Trapper ... [has] positioned themselves as the rough hewn renegades Young ... aspired to be ... Their live take on the album comes across as a tributes of sorts, a nod to Young as the forerunner of all that’s unpredictable and spontaneous when it comes to making music - i.e. the ability to defy expectations and his leave the public gasping with anticipation. That’s likely one reason they don’t play with the template. The arrangements remain true to the originals, sans the orchestration and cameos (Stephen Stills, James Taylor, Linda Rondstadt et al.) that helped accentuate the original recording. Given that formula, nothing can or does go astray. Live Harvest gives a classic album new life indeed."

Site KIJIS puts the album into perspective with Blitzen Trapper's larger career, stating, "To a certain extent, Blitzen Trapper's desire to retrace Neil Young’s fourth and arguably most famous album, Harvest provides some practical purpose; that is, to reestablish their Americana allegiance."

Site My San Antonio was effusive with their praise: "Portland indie band [Blitzen Trapper] may win Record Store Day with the live front-to-back recording of the classic Neil Young album."

== Tour ==
The band announced the tour for the album on February 4, 2015, explaining that the dates performing at City Winery locations in New York, Chicago, and Nashville would feature the band playing Harvest in its entirety, while "the other shows on the tour will be traditional BT performances with a few select tunes from Harvest sprinkled into the set." The tour ran as follows:

- April 11: Columbia, S.C. — River Rocks Festival
- April 12: Asheville, N.C. — Grey Eagle
- April 13: Indianapolis, Ind. — Radio Radio
- April 14: Chicago, Ill. — City Winery Blitzen Trapper Performs Harvest
- April 15: Columbus, — Ohio A&R Bar
- April 16: Wilmington, Del. — World Cafe Live Upstairs
- April 17: New York, N.Y. — City Winery Blitzen Trapper Performs Harvest
- April 18: Washington, D.C. — Black Cat
- April 19: Charlotte, N.C. — Visulite Theater
- April 20: Nashville, Tenn. — City Winery Blitzen Trapper Performs Harvest

Said website U of Music of the band's New York City performance, "Highlighted by Eric Earley’s energetically engaging vocal approach, guitarist Erik Menteer’s colorful and distinctive slide parts ... and warm harmonies that wonderfully fell into place when needed, their interpretation was a magnificent treat for the audience whose passion surged with each song ... They captured the full passion and fury of "Alabama" and "Words" with striking instinct for both songs’ heart and soul. The audience could best be described as insatiable and the band obliged by performing a rousing three song encore. The imagination, precision and passion Blitzen Trapper bring to the stage makes them a band well worth seeing."

== Production credits ==
- Recorded live at the Doug Fir Lounge in Portland, OR, October 17, 2014
- Recorded by Nathan Vanderpool and Martin Gonzalez
- Mixed by Eric Earley and Michael Van Pelt
- Mastered by Paul Gold at Salt Mastering
- Photography by Paul Laxer

== Track listing ==
All songs written by Neil Young.

Side One
No.	Title	Length
1.	"Out on the Weekend"	4:09
2.	"Harvest"	2:51
3.	"A Man Needs a Maid"	4:03
4.	"Heart of Gold"	3:06
5.	"Are You Ready for the Country"	3:52

Side Two
No.	Title	Length
6.	"Old Man"	2:51
7.	"There's a World"	3:14
8.	"Alabama"	3:43
9.	"The Needle and the Damage Done"	2:11
10.	"Words"	5:07
