= Holy Smokes Future Jokes =

Studio album by Blitzen Trapper
- Released: September 25, 2020
- Genre: Folk rock
- Length: 37:09
- Label: Yep Roc

Blitzen Trapper chronology
Wild and Reckless (2017)	Holy Smokes Future Jokes (2020)	100's of 1000's, Millions of Billions (2024)

Holy Smokes Future Jokes is the tenth studio album by the American band Blitzen Trapper, released on September 25, 2020. Its songs were inspired by frontman Eric Earley's time working at a homeless shelter as well as his interest in Tibetan concepts of the afterlife.

== Critical reception ==
Professional ratings
Review scores
Source	Rating
AllMusic	4/5 stars
American Songwriter	3.5/5 stars
Mojo	4/5 stars
Uncut	7/10

AllMusic called the album "a versatile ten-song set that's built on a chassis of billowy psych rock, widescreen Americana, and chamber pop." American Songwriter labeled it "intriguing, always tuneful folk rock that settles into a Dawes-meets-Stealers Wheel vibe, especially since Earley’s smoothly rolling voice is uncannily similar to that of Gerry Rafferty with a side of Mark Knopfler." Mojo considered it "Dylan gone power-pop".

== Track listing ==
All songs written by Eric Earley

No.	Title	Length
1.	"Baptismal"	4:33
2.	"Bardo's Light (Ouija, Ouija)"	3:16
3.	"Don't Let Me Run"	3:12
4.	"Magical Thinking"	2:54
5.	"Masonic Temple Microdose #1"	3:39
6.	"Requiem"	3:34
7.	"Holy Jokes Future Jokes"	4:58
8.	"Sons and Unwed Mothers"	3:16
9.	"Dead Billie Jean"	3:47
10.	"Hazy Morning"	4:00

== Credits ==
- Produced and engineered by Raymond Richards at Long Play
- Mixed by D. James Goodwin
- Mastered by Adam Gonsalves at Telegraph Mastering

Guest musicians

- Michael Blake, keys
- Heather Woods Broderick, backing vocals
- Haley Johnsen, backing vocals
- Ben Latimer, saxophone
- Luke Price, fiddle
- Raymond Richards, upright, keys, pedal steel
