= Blitzen Trapper =

American experimental band

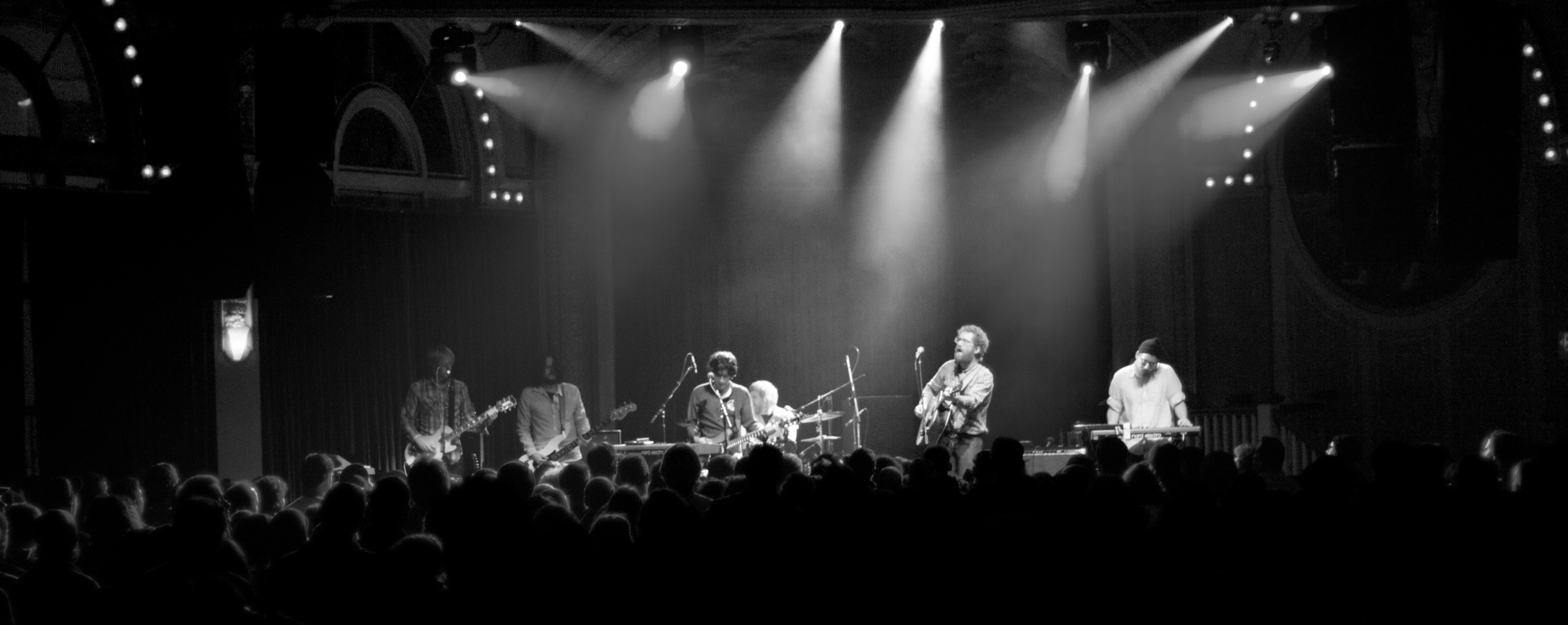
- Blitzen Trapper performing at the Crystal Ballroom in Portland, Oregon

Background information
- Origin: Portland, Oregon, United States
- Genres: Alternative country, indie folk
- Years active: 2000–present
- Labels: Lidkercow Ltd.; Sub Pop; Vagrant Records; Lojinx; Third Man; Yep Roc
- Members: Eric Earley; Brian Adrian Koch; Michael Elson; Nathan Vanderpool
- Past members: Drew Laughery; Erik Menteer; Michael Van Pelt; Marty Marquis
- Website: blitzentrapper.net

Blitzen Trapper is a Portland, Oregon-based experimental country/folk/rock band associated with Sub Pop Records, Vagrant Records, Lojinx, and Yep Roc. Formed in 2000, the band currently operates as a quartet, with Eric Earley (guitar/harmonica/vocals/keyboard), Brian Adrian Koch (drums/vocals/harmonica/guitar), Michael Elson (bass/keyboard), and Nathan Vanderpool (guitar/vocals); at some shows, Michael Blake fills in for Vanderpool. Blitzen Trapper self-released its first three albums. "Wild Mountain Nation" was No. 98 on Rolling Stone's list of the 100 Best Songs of 2007.

Blitzen Trapper released its third album, Wild Mountain Nation, in 2007 to much acclaim from critics such as Pitchfork, The Nerve, and Spin. The group signed to Sub Pop Records in the summer of 2007.

After the release of Furr in 2008, the group received a two-page feature in Rolling Stone. The album was ranked No. 13 on Rolling Stone's Best Albums of 2008 while the title track was ranked No. 4 on the magazine's Best Singles of 2008. The albums Destroyer of the Void and American Goldwing followed, to similarly high acclaim.

On October 1, 2013, the band released VII, their first on Vagrant Records in the U.S.; the album also appeared on British indie label Lojinx in Europe on September 30. In mid-December 2014, the band self-published their first live album, Live In Portland, followed by the Record Store Day exclusive, a live cover album of Neil Young's Harvest record titled Live Harvest. Their eighth studio album, All Across This Land, was released on October 2, 2015. Their ninth studio release – marking a return to the band's own label LidKerCow – is titled Wild and Reckless and was released on November 3, 2017.

At the end of 2019, longtime members Erik Menteer (guitar/keyboard), Michael Van Pelt (bass), and Marty Marquis (guitar/keyboards/vocals/melodica) retired from the band. Remaining founding members Earley and Koch returned to touring in 2022 with a new lineup. During their hiatus from live shows, the band signed to Yep Roc for the release of their tenth album, Holy Smokes Future Jokes, on September 25, 2020.

== History ==
=== 2000–2003: The Garmonbozia years ===
I dropped out of school and began to write songs, to play music. This was not music that ever traveled, at least not for many years (my lower-class, small town upbringing ensured I had absolutely no ambition), but it was music that permeated everything. My friends and I lived together, made recordings, played occasional shows and mostly just worked out our demons through narcotic substances and song.

— Eric Earley, on his early years discovering music.

The band that would come to be known as Blitzen Trapper began life under the name Garmonbozia (in reference to the fictitious substance present in David Lynch's Twin Peaks) in the year 2000. The Portland, Oregon-based lineup consisted of songwriter/lead singer Eric Earley, Erik Menteer (guitar, keyboard), Brian Adrian Koch (drums, vocals), Michael Van Pelt (bass), Drew Laughery (keyboard), and Marty Marquis (keyboard, vocals). Many of the Garmonbozia recordings are experimental prog-rock and psychedelic songs, more concerned with creating interesting soundscapes than the tighter rock/soul/country/pop crispness of their later albums. Their first known recording as a band is untitled and incomplete; only two songs, "Something Blue" and "Oklahoma," remain. "Oklahoma" is a largely instrumental suite that nonetheless contains pop elements, while "Something Blue" is a trippier prog-rock piece incorporating sound samples, sound effects, and noise. The two approaches to these very early songs hint at later song structures throughout their pre-label albums, up to and including their breakthrough album, Wild Mountain Nation.

In 2001, the band's output exploded, as they self-recorded four albums with homemade artwork, which they distributed at concerts. 1940, the first of the four, included an early version of "Lover Leave Me Drowning," which would later appear on the Blitzen Trapper album Destroyer of the Void. This was followed soon by the eight-track Perms, Porn & the Gestalt; unusually, the shorter songs (such as the 2:10 "Fugue in Five Parts") tend more toward the experimental, while the longest song, the 7:13 "Lover In Tow," is structurally similar to the early "Oklahoma," containing guitar-based melodies and a pop sensibility. Tremolopsi! followed, again featuring prog elements and structures; the band incorporates three fantasias on the fairly straightforward pop-rock song "Tallahassee" subtitled "Theme Variatours," for example. The band's final 2001 album, Omnibus and the Baker's Man (A Pretext For Black Movie Magic), features the first known recording of "Reno," a song that would find its way onto Blitzen Trapper's first album. The band also performed live full sets on radio stations KBOO and KPSU in 2001.

The band headed back to the studio to record 2002's Boom, which contains a very early version of the song "Sadie"; a more polished version of the song would later close Blitzen Trapper's Destroyer of the Void album in 2010. Increasingly, the band's songs were edging closer to tracks that would place on albums in the band's Blitzen Trapper incarnation; their final 2002 studio recording, R | L, included early versions of several songs that would appear on Blitzen Trapper's eponymous first record, including "AppleTrees," "The All Girl Team," and "Texaco."

The band's final statement as Garmonbozia was the studio record Duble Pepy Majik Plus, an 18-track LP expanding on the R | L track list, and boasting even more songs that would later appear on Blitzen Trapper, including "Donkie Boy" and "Ansel and Emily DeSader." (An EP of tracks cut from these last two studio records, titled UNRL or perhaps UNR | L, includes the first version of "Asleep For Days," which would appear on 2004's Field Rexx). None of these recordings have ever been made available commercially, although many of these records were distributed at Garmonbozia concerts in Portland, and have later surfaced occasionally on the internet.

=== 2003–2007: Pre-label ===
In 2003, the band changed their name to Blitzen Trapper, reportedly a reference to singer Eric Earley's seventh-grade girlfriend, who kept a Trapper Keeper binder and drew pictures of Santa Claus and his reindeer on it, her favorite reindeer being Blitzen. Following the name change, the band finally released their first commercial album, the eponymous Blitzen Trapper, on their own label LidKerCow Ltd, in 2003. A decade later, Earley recalled the recording process:

I don't remember much about making this first record, too long ago maybe. I guess I remember this Mexican dive bar we'd go to after sessions with GW (Gregg Williams) who was engineering the record. We'd drink tequila and play pool and watch Blazers games. Drew took the cover shot down at the coast at some junk shop off the highway. An Indian and a zebra. That says it all.

On December 2, 2003, the band returned to radio station KPSU and recorded their first live show under the Blitzen Trapper name, playing songs from their first album and previewing some – including "Leopard's Will to Live" and "40 Stripes" – from their next. Despite this local publicity, the album Blitzen Trapper failed to make much of an initial impact, and was soon followed by 2004's Field Rexx, also released on LidKerCow. According to the liner notes, Rexx was "Recorded at the carny shack, fer shook n timsel on Duke's shoot-o-matic for tisks & soda & that ol' broke 4-track what 3-fingrd mike poured old English on and lit on fire." For the first time, Blitzen Trapper received some national attention; Chicago-based pop-culture review site Pitchfork reviewed the album, giving it 7.0 out of 10. Comparing the album to artists as diverse as Beck, Willie Nelson, and Rogue Wave, Pitchfork stated, "their sophomore effort shouldn't be dismissed as fluff – Field Rexx is an earnest crack at bluegrass, country, and folk that's young and brazen enough to incorporate elements from multiple genres."

Blitzen Trapper struggled with their follow-up to Field Rexx. Eric Earley recorded a new album, simply titled Trapper, on a two-track reel-to-reel in his bedroom; like the Garmonbozia records, Trapper was not released. As a band, Blitzen Trapper recorded a full album of tracks titled Waking Bullets at Breakneck Speed (alternately titled BT3 and All Saints at various stages of its production). They worked with producers Mike Coykendall and Gregg Williams to record some tracks for the new record, and recorded others by themselves, but as publicist Matt Wright later stated, "Waking Bullets just wasn't really coming together as an album," and the project was shelved. Wright then released a promo EP to blogs titled Blitzen Trapper Advance Album Sampler Promo Thingy, containing the track "On a Dime," which was later included on the Portland-based PDX Pop Now! 2006 compilation album.

This paved the way for Blitzen Trapper's breakthrough album, 2007's Wild Mountain Nation, which Earley describes as "a record that sounded like it had been authored by a drunken scarecrow who had been dragged behind a truck." Their final self-released full-length studio record, Nation found even more acclaim with critics than Field Rexx. PopMatters.com raved that "Wild Mountain Nation is indeed a rare gift—a music reviewer's dream come true." Pitchfork rated the record "Best New Music" and granted an 8.5-star review, stating, "Compared to their previous albums, Wild Mountain Nation has a newfound and audible confidence. It's the work of an assured band who can not only treat genre like so much fingerpaint, but brave enough to play it straight for a minute – not as an empty exercise, but a chance to aspire ... Wild Mountain Nation is a revelation from beginning to end." For the first time, Blitzen Trapper released an official music video, a half-animated/half-live action clip promoting the title track, directed by Orie Weeks III. Rolling Stone named the track one of the best of 2007, placing it at 98 and calling it "A shambling, hypermelodic jam from Portland, Oregon, indie boys down with Native American culture ... and the best Grateful Dead knockoff in forever." The influential magazine Spin promoted an exclusive track titled "Boss King," which raised awareness of the group despite the fact that the song wasn't on the new record.

In September 2007, acclaimed indie studio Daytrotter conducted their first interview with Blitzen Trapper and invited the group to perform four acoustic tracks; this was the start of a long relationship between the band and the studio. A month later, the band released their first EP, containing outtakes from Wild Mountain Nation (including "Boss King"), as well as "Jericho," a song from the Daytrotter session that is the first Blitzen Trapper song to not feature Earley on lead vocals (Marty Marquis, who wrote the song, does the honors).

In 2007, Blitzen Trapper signed to the indie label Sub Pop.

=== 2008–2012: Sub Pop ===
==== Furr ====
In September 2008, Blitzen Trapper released their first record for Sub Pop records, Furr, to near-universal critical acclaim. As with Wild Mountain Nation, the new album was recorded in an old telegraph building by the Willamette River in Portland, Oregon, in the group's studio at Sally Mack's School of Dance. Essentially living at the studio, head writer and lead singer Eric Earley worked on many of the songs late at night when the other bands in the space had gone. One of the main components of the album's sound was a barely usable out-of-tune piano discovered at the studio one day, and featuring on the tracks, "Not Your Lover" and "Echo." Referring to it as a "timely, honest record," Earley recalls of the recording process,

But Furr was a record that spoke from new perspectives we'd gained on the road. It was me becoming aware of the past I'd been trying to forget, and of the greater world around me. It's no surprise that the opening track is a dream-like treatise on the state of the western world.

The album was an immediate critical hit. Rolling Stone gave it four out of five stars, calling it, "an engaging album full of rootsy beauty: gorgeous, wilderness-wandering ballads like 'Stolen Shoes & a Rifle' offer all the benefits of a great pastoral folk-rock record, but Blitzen also toss in ragged guitars, cheap keyboards and mildly weird psych rock on jams such as "Fire and Fast Bullets" ... Throughout the album, Blitzen keep their songs highly tuneful, making Furr a breakthrough ..." The magazine also profiled the band in a two-page feature titled "Blitzen Trapper's American Pastoral", listed Furr on its "50 Best Albums of 2008" and the title track placed at #4 on its "100 Best Singles of 2008."

More critical acclaim followed: The A.V. Club called Furr Blitzen Trapper's "most focused album yet" in its A− review, while Pitchfork gave it another 8.5, saying that Furr is "an essential 13-song LP with no filler." For the first time, the band got national television exposure by performing "Furr" on Late Night With Conan O'Brien, and further promoted the album with two videos: one for "Furr," directed by Jade Harris (a "stop motion video featuring thousand[s] of paper cut outs") and "Black River Killer," an atmospheric clip directed by Daniel Elkayam. All the effort paid off: Furr was Blitzen Trapper's most popular album yet, reaching 189 on the Billboard "Top 200" chart, and hit 22 on the Top Independent Chart and went as high as #6 on the Heatseekers chart.

The band launched a massive tour in support of Furr, traveling all over the United States and Canada, and venturing overseas to venues in Belgium, the Netherlands, Germany, and more. Festival appearances proliferated: on March 19, 2008, the band played the SXSW Festival as a part of the Sub Pop Showcase in the Radio Room. Next came the Monolith Festival, at the Red Rocks Amphitheater in Colorado in mid-September, followed by an April 17, 2009 appearance at the enormously popular Coachella Music Festival for the first time, under headliners The Killers, and sharing the date with artists such as Amy Winehouse and Drive-By Truckers. Rolling Stone commented on the band's Coachella performance, stating, "the six-piece Blitzen Trapper rode wild flights of guitar melody and feedback, with extended tunes of fuzz and contemplation." Coachella was only the beginning of Blitzen Trapper's busy 2009: they played the Pitchfork Music Festival in July, and a month later appeared at Lollapalooza under headliners Soundgarden, Green Day, and Lady Gaga, and in June, Blitzen Trapper played the Bonnaroo Music and Arts Festival for the first time. This performance elicited even more effusive praise from Rolling Stone: "their harmonies were crystalline and soaring, gleaming against the music's ragged backdrop. While classic American music is their source material, the band is devoted to radically rearranging it, scuffing it up and refitting it to serve their own purposes."

On April 18, 2009, Blitzen Trapper released its first 7" vinyl single for Record Store Day: "War Is Placebo"/"Booksmart Baby"; the record was a color vinyl limited to 1500 copies. Band member Marty Marquis explained the genesis of the tracks: "The A side was part of the abortive Waking Bullets record, B side was recorded as part of something Earley ended up calling "Wooden Dress and Dresser Set", the same source as 'Going Down' and 'Shoulder Full of You' off the tour EP." The tour EP in question was a CD-R of a new EP called EP3 featuring five non-album songs the band had been selling at shows. Some of the songs, such as "Big Black Bird" and "Preacher's Sister's Boy" were also remnants of the aborted Waking Bullets at Breakneck Speed project; an early version of one song, "Silver Moon," had been released as part of the Blitzen Trapper Advance Album Sampler Promo Thingy. When the band released the collection commercially through Sub Pop, they included the Furr version of the song "Black River Killer"; consequentially, the name changed from EP3 to Black River Killer EP. The EP made a significant splash on the Billboard charts, placing at #22 on the Heatseekers Chart.

==== Destroyer of the Void ====
With the tour over, a new album was imminent. Band member Marty Marquis hinted at the direction of the new album, stating, "We've got a bunch of new material and have also gone back and looked at a bunch of unreleased stuff that we think are really strong tunes that would make a contribution with the new stuff," further explaining that the song, "The Tailor," would be "a really crazy, psychedelic tale along the lines of Furr, but the arrangements are not so folky and simple. The tale itself and the poetry that expresses it is, I think, the next level above what we did with Furr."

Marquis also came up with the name for the new album, Destroyer of the Void; Eric Earley admitted, "I couldn't think of a name for it." Released in 2010, most of Destroyer was recorded by Mike Coykendall (like some of the earlier, mostly abortive Waking Bullets at Breakneck Speed tracks) and mixed by Earley and bassist Michael Van Pelt at Coykendall's Blue Rooms Studios in Portland. National Public Radio provided a full stream of the album in late May 2010, calling the album, "another ambitious and stylistically diverse curveball." Director Daniel Elkayam, who had previously directed the "Black River Killer" video, created a mystical, soft-lit clip for the album's "The Tree" (featuring Alela Diane).

Prepublicity also came from within: drummer Brian Adrian Koch created an eerie, horror-movie-esque promo video for the album, hinting at the new sonic directions of the album, and the band's newly revamped website offered a stream of the album's "Dragon Song" and a download of a demo version of "Heaven and Earth." Earley described the somewhat hodgepodge nature of the record:

I had already cobbled together a new record during the previous year of touring, Destroyer of the Void, a patchwork of songs from my past and present which hung together like a house of cards. But there were certain glimmers of where Blitzen Trapper was heading, a certain feeling of open road and of heartfelt loss.

Blitzen Trapper was invited by influential rock band Pavement to play the All Tomorrow's Parties festival on May 15, 2010, an invitation Earley later remembered fondly: "We toured with Stephen Malkmus [of Pavement] and he was a big hero of mine in high school, so that was really fun." On May 21, 2010, the band played a full televised set on the Netherlands' VPRO broadcast network, with a focus on highlighting the songs from the new album, including "Destroyer of the Void," "Love and Hate," "Evening Star," and more. The band played the album's "Dragon Song" on Late Night With Jimmy Fallon on June 17 of that year, and, as part of an extensive tour in the United States and abroad, took part in the Crossing Border Festival in Amsterdam, one of the most massive music and literature festivals in Europe. as well as the Newport Folk Festival in July. Reviews for the album were good. Pitchfork proffered a 7.5 rating, while Rolling Stone championed the record as, "Trading low-fi ruggedness for gorgeous Americana pop, they conjure Dylan circa John Wesley Harding and proggy ELO but with bong-stoked epiphanies all their own." Following the tour, longtime band member Drew Laughery left the band, as Eric Earley was impatient to get to the new album: "I wrote American Goldwing, our third Sub Pop release, in a span of six months, recorded most of it, and then we went on tour for Destroyer of the Void...all the time knowing that this new record I'd recorded was the real record, the Blitzen Trapper record to come."

It's me trying to hazard a true American nostalgia ... [T]here's a good amount of thrashing about, trying to get loose. The roughness of rock and roll and the independence of travel act as the flip-side to all this sentimental backward-glancing. The earthiness of these songs makes you want to get loaded and get in a fight, or find a girl and fall in love forever, simultaneously.

— Eric Earley, on writing American Goldwing.

==== American Goldwing ====
Writing American Goldwing came easily for Eric Earley. "I usually write songs pretty fast, in like 20-30 minutes. For the new record I wrote them all in a month or so. I'm not a good deliberator, I get out a guitar and it comes to me." In his Sub Pop assessment of the band and his own songwriting, Earley indicates a tragedy, "a death of which I can't speak," spurring on the writing and recording of the album. Despite the very personal nature of the songwriting (Earley even indicated that the record had originally been intended as a solo effort), American Goldwing became the first Blitzen Trapper album to which creators outside the band were invited to collaborate. Bassist Michael Van Pelt suggested bringing in Grammy-winning producer and audio engineer Tchad Blake to mix the album, and Portland-based producer Gregg Williams (Quarterflash, The Dandy Warhols), who had recorded some of the tracks for the Waking Bullets at Breakneck Speed project, co-produced all the tracks on the record.

Sub Pop released two trailer videos for the album, one straightforward clip featuring Earley riding in the back of a truck, underscored by musical snippets of "Might Find it Cheap" and "Stranger in a Strange Land", and a more surreal movie-trailer video, featuring a narrator with a spooky-seductive French accent, murderous clowns, and bodies floating in swimming pools, based around "Street Fighting Sun". Continuing the fun, creepy vibe, the band released a short movie titled The Blitzen Trapper Massacre, produced and directed by comedian and actor Rainn Wilson (of NBC's The Office, starring as a psychotic fan) and Joshua Homnick and written by Wilson and Blitzen Trapper's Brian Adrian Koch; the film debuted on the site Funny Or Die. No fewer than three official music videos accompanied the album: "Love the Way You Walk Away" – the first video featuring the full band in a live-action performance – directed by Patrick Stanton; "Girl in a Coat," directed by "Black River Killer" and "The Tree" director Daniel Elkayam; and "Taking It Easy Too Long," directed by Blitzen Trapper drummer and filmmaker Brian Adrian Koch. In addition, director and photographer Rich Tarbell directed a series of live performances for WNRN, a public radio station based in Charlottesville, Virginia. Finally, in anticipation of the new full-length record, the band once again participated in Record Store Day on April 16, 2011, offering the 7" vinyl single, "Maybe Baby/Soul Singer." Only 1500 copies of the single were produced, and all came with a download code.

Blitzen Trapper released American Goldwing on September 13, 2011, to mainly positive reviews. AllMusic pegged the record as "a straight-up, mid-'70s inspired Southern rock album that fuses the Saturday night swagger of Lynyrd Skynyrd with the stoic peasantry of The Band," while Rolling Stone called it an "intoxicating roots fantasy." On release date, the band played an in-store live set of mostly new tracks (and one Led Zeppelin cover) at Easy Street Records in Seattle, Washington. The album made waves on various Billboard charts, as well, placing at #104 on the Billboard 200, 32 on Top Rock Albums, #20 on the Alternative Albums chart, #19 on the Tastemaker chart, and as high as #4 on the Folk Albums chart. A major tour followed, highlighted by appearances at festivals such as Bumbershoot, Doe Bay, Blues & Roots, and the Newport Folk Festival, a co-headlining slot at 2012's Pickathon festival, and several shows at which Blitzen Trapper played with the popular and influential alt-rock band Wilco. In April 2012, the band once again released a 7" single for Record Store Day, this time a cover of Jimi Hendrix's version of "Hey Joe," backed with "Skirts On Fire." It was the largest limited release yet: 1800 copies, pressed on yellow vinyl.

Following the tour, the band reached back into its past. On the following Record Store Day (April 20, 2013), and in celebration of its tenth anniversary as Blitzen Trapper, the band released a remastered vinyl version of their first, eponymous, album on vinyl, with five unearthed bonus tracks. Remastered specifically for vinyl by Bruce Barielle, only 1,000 black vinyl copies were pressed, with 200 "Coke bottle clear" records mixed in randomly with the release; all copies included a digital download code. Rolling Stone heralded the new release with a streaming preview of one of the bonus tracks, "On a Tuesday", about which Earley stated, "Not sure I recall what the song's even about – something sad, that's for sure."

=== 2013–2016: Vagrant Records ===
==== VII ====
On October 1, 2013, Blitzen Trapper released their seventh album, appropriately titled VII, on Vagrant Records, their first album with a new label since 2008's Furr. Eric Earley described VII as "hillbilly gangster," saying:

It's just me wanting to mix that dark, gangster vibe with the kind of music I grew up listening to and see if it can kind of make sense ... It seems to work. It's a good vehicle for telling stories, too.

The early media hype for VII was strong, with the band playing a short live set for The Current studios (performing the new songs "Shine On," "Thirsty Man," and "Don't Be a Stranger.") Rolling Stone offering an exclusive stream of the new track "Ever Loved Once", and the Chicago-based radio station WXRT providing a free download of the song "Shine On," complete with a commentary track by Earley and guest vocalist Liz Vice. In December, two months after the album was released, the station followed up this giveaway with another: a free download of the song, "Thirsty Man," also from VII. "Thirsty Man" was also released as a single on iTunes, with additional non-album tracks "The Prophet" and "Plenty of Thrills."

This single did very well for Blitzen Trapper, propelled by a music video directed by Portland-based photographer Robbie Augspurger, described as a "surreal and goofy take on noir tropes" by Stereogum. For the first time ever, the band placed on a singles chart on Billboard, with "Thirsty Man" hitting #29 on the Adult Alternative Songs chart. The album itself fared well on the charts, peaking at #41 on the Independent Albums chart and #11 on the Folk Albums chart.

A tour in support of the record followed, including appearances at festivals such as the Cultivate Music Festival, the First City Festival, the Mountain Jam Festival, and the 2013 FloydFest (theme: "Rise & Shine"), the popular world music and arts festival held annually near Floyd, Virginia. The tour continued into 2014, including two longer stands at Portland's Doug Fir Lounge, and a nine-show stint with the influential rock band, Drive-By Truckers. In February, Rolling Stone premiered a streaming outtake from VII titled "Coming Home"; Eric Earley stated that "with this track we wanted to lay down some good old-fashioned country funk, with horns and banjos side by side ... It recalls the swampy truck stop sounds of Jim Ford or Mac Davis, telling ourselves that home is just around the bend." The band, through their British label Lojinx would later release the song as a free download on SoundCloud. It wouldn't be the last time that year that the band would release outtakes from VII: in accordance with tradition, Blitzen Trapper released a new 7" vinyl single for Record Store Day, consisting of two unreleased tracks from the VII sessions: "Hold On" and "On a Dime Woman" (this latter is not to be confused with the Waking Bullets at Breakneck Speed outtake "On a Dime"; the two are different songs).

==== Live In Portland ====
On December 17, 2014, the band announced that its first-ever live album was imminent, featuring songs culled from three shows played over November 29 and 30 at the Doug Fir Lounge the previous year. Titled Live In Portland, the tracks selected for this record would be spread fairly evenly from Blitzen Trapper's career, with one song from the Cool Love#1 EP, two songs from Wild Mountain Nation, three from VII, five from American Goldwing (including the bonus track, "Street Fighting Sun"), and six songs from Furr. Live In Portland would feature no songs from Blitzen Trapper, Field Rexx, or Destroyer of the Void. Rather than release a physical album or an album through media outlets such as iTunes, Blitzen Trapper made Live In Portland downloadable (or streaming) for free, or as a "name your price" download through the website Bandcamp. Explaining the intent of the album, Eric Earley said:

This is our first release of any live material and it's got everything I like about our live show, it's intimate, it's messy and it's grounded in our interaction on stage, just these guys that grew up together playing songs and messing around on a stage. This is for all the fans who've seen us and know that when we're performing we're trying to give as much as we possibly can. So it's also our gift to the fans, a free live thing for the Holidays.

Not counting the re-release of their eponymous first album in 2013, Live In Portland is the first full-length album released on Blitzen Trapper's personal label, LidKerCow, since 2007's Wild Mountain Nation.

==== Live Harvest ====
On February 14, 2015, the band announced their next release would also be a live album recorded at the Doug Fir Lounge, this time as a Record Store Day exclusive. Recorded on October 17 at the Doug Fir Lounge in Portland, Oregon at the end of the VII tour, Live Harvest is a song-for-song interpretation of Neil Young's 1972 album Harvest. Live Harvest was released on April 18 as a 180-gram vinyl LP with a download card. Explaining the impetus for performing the album, Earley stated, "We all love Neil and that record has a lot of songs that everyone recognizes ... We wanted it to be something that the fans can connect with as we play it. Plus, it's an easy record. The songs are so well-written and smooth – it's really easy and fun to play."

Unusually, while Eric Earley sings lead on most of the album's tracks, keyboardist Marty Marquis (who had previously sung lead on only one other Blitzen Trapper song, "Jericho") sings lead on "A Man Needs a Maid," while drummer Brian Adrian Koch sings lead for the first time on "The Needle and the Damage Done." The band launched a short tour in support of the record, including stops at several City Winery locations in New York, Nashville, and Chicago, in which they played Harvest in its entirety, as well as Blitzen Trapper songs.

==== All Across This Land ====
On April 22, 2015, the band announced that new album All Across This Land would be released on October 2 via Vagrant Records in the US and Lojinx in Europe; the band's official site confirmed this on July 22, 2015, providing album art and a full roster of tour dates. The announcement stated, "Really hope you guys enjoy this one – we think it's our best yet."

In April of the same year, in an interview with Delaware Online, Eric Earley hinted at the direction of All Across This Land: "It's a little more of a live, aggressive record. It's probably the truest-sounding to our live show ... In certain ways, it harkens back to American Goldwing or even maybe some stuff on Furr. It's a return to a classic rock sort of thing." The band began playing a new song, "Rock & Roll Is Made For You," near the end of the Live Harvest tour, and while Delaware Online suggested that that might be the new album's title, the rumor was soon dispelled by Marty Marquis.

Another short tour followed the official Live Harvest tour, beginning at WhiskeyTown in Portland. In anticipation of the tour's third show at Missoula, Montana's Top Hat Lounge, website Missoulan provided the new album's real name, All Across This Land. The site also indicated that the performance would not only include songs from Live Harvest, but also several songs from the new album. Following the show, the official Twitter account of the band verified that several of the songs played the previous night were cuts from the new record: "Lonesome Angel," "Rock N Roll Was Made For You," "Mystery & Wonder," "Across the River," and "All Across This Land." The band's British label Lojinx released an album trailer for the new record on July 17, and the band officially previewed the album on July 22, offering a free stream of the new song, "Lonesome Angel" on their SoundCloud account.

Following the October 2, 2015 release of the album, Blitzen Trapper went on a tour of the United States that continued through the end of the year. In early 2016, they took the tour to the UK, starting in February at Le Botanique in Brussels, Belgium.

On November 16, 2015, the television show Fargo aired the episode "Rhinoceros," featuring Blitzen Trapper's cover of the song "I Am a Man of Constant Sorrow." The song later appeared on January 15, 2016, as part of an EP containing the second single from All Across This Land, "Mystery & Wonder," and a live version of "Let the Cards Fall."

==== Live at Third Man Records ====
Blitzen Trapper's first new recording of 2016 was a song titled "Summer Rain," released as part of Amazon's "Sounds of Summer" playlist. "It's remembering hot summers when the rains were a relief, memories from childhood mostly when the days were long and full of adventure," Eric Earley stated. Announced by Rolling Stone on May 13 (with a link to stream the new song), the playlist was released exclusively for streaming on June 3.

Announcement Image for Blitzen Trapper's unique fall 2016 tour, "Songbook."

On July 5, 2016, the band announced a new acoustic fall tour titled "Songbook: A Night of Stories and Songs," intending it to be a "stripped-down acoustic experience ... telling stories and sharing the inspirations behind some of their most beloved songs, including those from their favorite songwriters and influences." Initially the tour was scheduled for midwest and southern dates, but on August 23, the band announced west coast dates, as well.

Paste magazine announced Blitzen Trapper's third live album, Live at Third Man Records on August 17, 2016. Recorded live and direct-to-acetate on the Blue Room Stage at Jack White's Third Man Records, the vinyl recording was released on September 1, 2016. Focusing mainly on live versions of songs from All Across This Land, the ten-song album also included "Texaco" and "Love the Way You Walk Away," two live versions of songs from earlier studio albums that had not figured on their previous live album, Live in Portland. On August 15, 2016, the band announced via their Facebook page that they had embarked on the recording their ninth studio record.

=== 2017–2019: Return to LidKerCow ===
==== Wild and Reckless stage production ====
In mid-August 2016, Blitzen Trapper began recording what they called "Record #9." Three tweets on their Twitter account captured the band in the studio: one video of Koch laying down a drum track, plus two photographs: one of Earley at a Hammond B3 Organ and another of Earley and Marquis at keyboards.

In late 2016, the website for Portland Center Stage at The Armory announced a new theatrical experience featuring Blitzen Trapper. According to the site:

Portland folk rockers Blitzen Trapper refuse to be pinned down and boxed in. The acclaimed band has mixed genre after genre into their musical arsenal over the fifteen years of playing together. Now they're unleashing their sound — and knack for lyrical storytelling — on the PCS stage. They've mined their Oregonian roots to create a show that asks: What's the sound of a life falling through the cracks? Fusing the energy of a rock concert with the imaginative possibility of the theater, Blitzen Trapper and PCS join forces in this new project, tracing the unforgettable stories of ordinary Americans caught in an extraordinary struggle to not get left behind.

Billed as a "new musical event," Wild and Reckless was co-directed by Rose Riordan and Liam Kaas-Lentz; performances ran from March 16, 2017, to April 30, 2017. The band released a limited-edition companion album containing ten tracks: "Black River Killer" (from Furr), "Below the Hurricane" (from Destroyer of the Void), and "Astronaut" (from American Goldwing), along with seven tracks recorded exclusively for Wild and Reckless. The release was limited to 500 vinyl pressings and 500 CDs, sold only at performances of the show. In anticipation of the show, Entertainment Weekly previewed one of the new tracks, "Love Live On," via SoundCloud.

Wild and Reckless: Soundtrack from the Portland Center Stage Production marked a return to the band's own label, LidKerCow Ltd. Their reason for going off-label, Earley explained, was, "If you do it yourself, you can account for every penny." He also felt that the only value in being signed had been for networking. Blitzen Trapper was now able to build their own network, though doing that could be complicated.

==== Unreleased Recordings, Vol. 1 ====
Unreleased Recordings, Vol. 1: Waking Bullets at Breakneck Speed was released on April 22, 2017, for Record Store Day. This 10-track LP compiles songs recorded in 2006 and 2007, immediately before Earley turned to making Wild Mountain Nation and Furr. The album's subtitle came from a similar, scrapped 2006 project where many of these tracks originated.

Some of the unreleased songs might be familiar to fans. One of them, "The Quiet Noise," plays in part in "Echo/Always On/EZ Con" from Furr, and the instrumental "Cowboy Cassette" became "Big Black Bird" on the Black River Killer EP. A third song, "Dime," had many previous appearances, including as the opening track on a 2006 PDX Pop Now! compilation and on Blitzen Trapper Advance Album Sampler Promo Thingy. Additionally, an alternate take of this song was used as background music in a Fall 2011 tour video.

==== Wild and Reckless studio album ====
Blitzen Trapper's eighth studio album, Wild and Reckless, came out on November 3, 2017.

The studio album is quickly distinguished from the soundtrack of the same name by its cover art of a pinkish, reflected picture of an RV inside a circle, different from the soundtrack cover art of a lightning bolt. This LP had a standard worldwide distribution in both physical and digital formats on the band's LidKerCow label. The Wild and Reckless studio album included twelve tracks, with none from earlier studio albums. Seven of the songs had first emerged on the soundtrack, and five more were completely new: "Rebel," "Joanna," "Stolen Hearts," "Baby Won't You Turn Me On" and "Forever, Pt. 2."

Earley said that, like his previous albums, the songs told about the "end of America," such as the Raymond Carver-influenced "Rebel," a story about a lost lover who tries and fails to live up to the American Dream.

Several reviewers pointed out the influence of Bruce Springsteen, Tom Petty and Neil Young on Wild and Reckless. NPR noted that the blend of country-rock with orchestral and experimental sounds made it like a "companion piece" to Furr that also "stands on its own as a sprawling, sumptuous testament to Weird America." Many reviews were positive, though not all: A writer at college station ACRN insisted that "spacey Americana," such as this album, simply should not exist.

Earley said that he didn't intend for Wild and Reckless to be a "concept album," as NPR and many other reviewers called it, but it ended up sounding conceptual because of its connection to the stageplay. He agreed with comparisons to Furr, explaining to Entertainment Weekly that Wild and Reckless is "like a cross-eyed stepchild to Furr, in that it chronicles the darker dystopian stories of rural and suburban West Coast death-drive via a riffing psychedelic landscape."

Four music videos accompanied Wild and Reckless, all very different than the stageplay. The first, "Rebel," presents Earley as a cop on the run from thugs played by the other band members. The video was directed by Mychal Sargent and written and produced by Blitzen Trapper drummer Brian Adrian Koch. Next, the video for the title track, directed by Jon Meyer, centers on a lonely masked apocalypse survivor, played by Jacob Bean-Watson. Koch, who produced this video and briefly appeared in it, mused on Instagram five years after production that it now seems "really prophetic." "Joanna" is more subtle, mainly guiding the viewer through a small abandoned neighborhood after a murder. Finally, the energetic "Dance with Me," produced by Code Bear Media and directed by Brad Burke, is an 80's throwback featuring Koch and actor/musician Storm Large leading two dance groups in an alley, until Earley takes over.

On November 2, the day before the album launch, the band flew to the U.S. east coast to begin their Wild and Reckless tour. They kicked off in Atlanta, where Earley, Menteer, Marquis and engineer Nathan Vanderpool appeared on Adult Swim's FishCenter Live stream. That night, they reunited with Koch and Van Pelt, who had been in transit, to play at The EARL. Blitzen Trapper then toured the U.S. for three weeks with opener Lilly Hiatt, who later joined the band during their set at several shows to cover the Beatles' "She Came in Through the Bathroom Window." Hiatt toured with the group for six more concerts on the west coast in December.

In April 2018, Kid's Album! became the next Record Store Day release of old material. This 5-song, 45 RPM, 10-inch EP, limited to 1250 copies, had been recorded to tape in 2005 at the Lavender Compound, the band's then-communal home, "using castoff Casio keyboards and various kid's musical gear." It features spirited lo-fi songs sung from a child's perspective, such as "New Shoes" and "Spelling Bee." "New Shoes" had previously appeared in 2007 on the children's compilation For the Kids Three! Three months before the EP came out, on January 28, 2018, Blitzen Trapper had performed some of its songs for young families during a JoyRx fundraising concert at Portland's Crystal Ballroom. The band that day had an unusual lineup, with Eric Earley on guitar, Marty Marquis on synth and electronic drums, and Nathan Vanderpool on bass.

Also in April 2018, Blitzen Trapper made their last overseas tour, visiting Belgium, the Netherlands, the U.K., Germany, Sweden, Norway, Denmark, Italy, and Spain.

==== Furr 10th Anniversary ====
On September 14, 2018, Sub Pop released a 10th Anniversary Deluxe Edition of Furr with an extra disc of bonus tracks recorded around the time of the 2008 session and tour. It includes live radio recordings of "Furr" and "God & Suicide" from the original Furr album, as performed July 14, 2009 for Morning Becomes Eclectic on KCRW. Three tracks, "War and Placebo," "Booksmart Baby" and "Maybe Baby," came from previous Record Store Day singles. Seven others had never been publicly released. This extended edition's insert includes an email interview with Eric Earley conducted by actor Rainn Wilson. In this interview, Earley discusses life changes, how he writes songs, the inspiration for the top tracks "Furr" and "Black River Killer," the other band members, and what it's like to tour. In a message on the front of the insert, he reminisces on recording the album:

"Listeners had to have been underwhelmed by the hit-and-miss production, the furry overdriven vocals and perilous sounding dubs, all industry standard production fare now. But the songs must have shone through the noise even then, the stand out title track recorded on a nearly defunct cassette 4-track in one take and mixed on a couple hundred dollar PC was almost an afterthought at the time, but its message was real enough, that life consists of change and growth, love and transformation."

For the 10th Anniversary of Furr, music critic Kevin Quigley published The Sound Sent Shivers Down My Back. The book is the first (and so far only) full-length publication about Blitzen Trapper. Across 166 pages with rare photos from the collection of bassist Michael Van Pelt, Quigley explores the band's history and guides fans through the apocalyptic meaning and the making of Furr.

The Furr 10th Anniversary Tour brought the celebration across the U.S. and Canada for 35 dates, starting in September 2018. On November 17 and 18, the band returned home to Portland to play two sold-out shows at the Doug Fir Lounge. Most shows of this tour began with the entire album performed in order, followed by a few of their classics, requests, and a song or two from the new bonus disc.

By the end of 2018, Eric Earley had shifted his focus to raising a family and working the night desk at a nonprofit that mainly provided shelter for unhoused veterans. Brian Koch was expanding his musical career, touring as a guitarist and songwriter with Kara Harris in the spacey folk-rock duo Dead Lee. Other band members now had families and were turning their attention to their own ambitions as well.

Earley later said that the Furr anniversary tour "felt kind of like our last tour. Like a closing." At that time, no one knew for sure that it would be their final major tour to involve founding members Marty Marquis, Erik Menteer and Michael Van Pelt. They continued to perform occasionally in towns around the Pacific Northwest throughout 2019. In an interview that year, Koch said that playing shows had become so sparse that it now felt "sweeter when it does happen." The quintet played in Portland for the last time on November 10 at Revolution Hall, recognizing Veterans Day by benefitting the nonprofit where Earley worked. After touring extensively for more than a decade, the five performed their final gig at The Crocodile in Seattle on November 22, 2019.

"For me, the past three or four years of touring, I was sort of trying to come to grips with what do I really want? And who am I aside from Blitzen Trapper?"

— Eric Earley, December 2020

Van Pelt moved to Los Angeles to work in advertising. Marquis pursued a master's degree in geographic information sciences. Menteer and his wife opened a cafe while renovating the historic Log Lodge in Rhododendron, OR. Koch intended to keep drumming for Blitzen Trapper. But with no idea if or when a new lineup would emerge, he focused on his own acting career and music projects, which he had mostly set aside since 2007 due to touring. Earley dove more deeply into nonprofit work, eventually becoming a full-time case manager, while exploring other arts such as carpentry and painting pictures of his clients and Central American migrants at the U.S./Mexico border. He wasn't playing guitar as much, finding his work at the shelter to be just as fulfilling as music had been.

=== 2020-present: Yep Roc ===
==== Holy Smokes Future Jokes ====
In January 2020, Blitzen Trapper's Instagram released a brief black-and-white teaser video of a recording session. Four months later, fans in quarantine were treated to a surprising music video, the band's first release since signing to Yep Roc. The official video for "Magical Thinking" showed only a single image: the cover of the upcoming album Holy Smokes Future Jokes. It was a photo taken from behind an unknown person looking at a fumigation tent covering a building. The ghostly song hinted that Earley was returning to the more psychedelic, ethereal sounds of early Blitzen Trapper.

The minimalist "Magical Thinking" video stood out in comparison to Blitzen Trapper's several previous narrative music videos featuring characters played by the band members. Two other music videos, "Masonic Temple Microdose #1" and "Dead Billie Jean," had little more for visuals, just simple 3-D graphics of a shoe or other everyday objects that melt away as if not important. The Holy Smokes Future Jokes album cover and music videos were designed by Endless Endless, a couple who specialize in making art for music. About the album's mysterious cover photo, Earley said, "they sent me that picture, and I just really liked it."

Holy Smokes Future Jokes was released September 25, 2020, after being bumped from its planned date of September 11, 2020. Several session musicians played on the album, including pianist Michael Blake, who later became a substitute guitarist for the live band. Brian Adrian Koch and Marty Marquis were the only other founding members who participated, providing drums and backup vocals respectively.

Earley's inspiration for the songs on Holy Smokes Future Jokes came mostly from the Tibetan Book of the Dead and George Saunders' 2017 novel Lincoln in the Bardo, as well as from his own work as a case manager. In his job, he was quickly learning about addiction and the human condition, and he was trying to make sense of it.

"I think working in the shelter changed my perspective so drastically… The American Dream and all this is an illusion, but we continue to hang on to it… So many of the songs on the record are about people who have died and they don't quite know that they have… It's this idea of people hanging onto things in this life that they should be letting go of."

Musically, he enjoyed returning to the fingerpicking-based style of songwriting that he had practiced as a teenager, rather than playing the power-chord rock of his past several albums.

Thought Earley was strongly influenced by his nonprofit work, he drew inspiration from many sources. The opening line of "Requiem," "I like the way you roll," came from Earley's three-year-old daughter. It is "a song about the earth itself," Earley explained in 2021 when speaking remotely to young students at Patton Middle School of McMinnville, OR. "There's been all kinds of extinctiction events on the planet, and even if humanity at some point goes extinct, life will start again and start the process of evolution all over again." Another track, "Dead Billie Jean," imagines that the suicidal fan who supposedly inspired Michael Jackson's song "Billie Jean" is a lost soul in the bardo. In a pop culture clash, she meets Lincoln's son (as inspired by Lincoln in the Bardo) as well as classic rock stars, and they're stuck in that place because none of them have accepted that they've died.

The album's overall reception was highly positive. Oregon Public Broadcasting reviewed Holy Smokes Future Jokes as "a thoughtful, deep album that deserves plenty of attention both for the songwriting and the lyrical content." American Songwriter noted the variety of musical influences, from older Brazilian tropicália to the British Invasion, and noted, "Despite the fact that his songs' characters enter their intermediate states after some very dark events — car wrecks, shootings, suicide, even an errant meteor — the album is infused with a lightness of being." Holy Smokes Future Jokes earned an average critic score of 79%, according to Metacritic.

During the pandemic shutdown, Earley sometimes held livestreams to connect with fans. He invited viewers to talk to him but mostly ended up just getting requests to play certain songs, "which is cool."

==== Unreleased Recordings, Vol. 2 ====
Soon after the release of Holy Smokes Future Jokes, on Record Store Day of October 2020, one more piece came out from the original lineup. Unreleased Recordings, Vol. 2: Too Kool compiled tracks recorded back in 2003 and 2004 at the Lavender Compound, the band's former communal home where they also produced the Garmonbozia albums and the first two Blitzen Trapper albums. Several songs from Too Kool had surfaced before, but not on a major release. "Rainy Day," "Crystal Ball," "On a Tuesday" and "Everything U Do" (as "Beard of Stars") came from Garmonbozia's Duble Pepy Majik Plus. Also, the band had used "Farthest Shore" and "Big Adventure" as background music in a 2011 Fall Tour Diary video series and had played "Big Adventure" live during the February 18, 2008 Daytrotter session.

Eric Earley reflected to American Songwriter that selecting the songs for Too Kool was "like looking at old journal entries or something. It's also fun to listen to, but it also makes me feel old. When I listen back to something 20 years ago, I'm like, 'wow, I had so much energy. What happened to that?'" The album was like a time capsule, with the mixes left exactly the same as they were on the day each one was recorded.

In late 2020, Earley began to publicize in interviews that Marquis, Menteer and Van Pelt would likely no longer tour with Blitzen Trapper, if the band ever toured again at all. "I knew there were changes coming with the band, so making the record, I wasn't thinking I'd tour it. I just liked what I was writing at the very second," Earley explained about Holy Smokes Future Jokes.

On May 7, 2021, a year and a half after their last live show, Blitzen Trapper played an acoustic concert stream, Live in the Living Room, hosted by Bandcamp. On the same date, they pre-released Holy Demos Future Demos, a digital album of demos of every song on Holy Smokes Future Jokes. The concert stream introduced fans to a new lineup with Eric Earley on guitar and lead vocals, Brian Adrian Koch on drums, Nate Vanderpool on bass, and Michael Blake on piano. It was the first appearance of Blake in the performing band. Vanderpool had been the band's front-of-house sound engineer as well as a substitute musician at some shows, but this marked his first appearance as a primary member of Blitzen Trapper. The band ultimately never made an official announcement that new band members would play future concerts, though fans shared the news among themselves.

Finally, in February 2022, Blitzen Trapper announced that they would return to touring in April, with 14 shows along only the Pacific coast. Kara Harris and Blitzen Trapper drummer Brian Koch's folk duo Dead Lee opened for them. The quartet included Eric Earley, Koch, Michael Elson and Michael Blake. Blake was a regular substitute for Nathan Vanderpool, who also toured as the front of house engineer for Fruit Bats and Bonny Light Horseman.

During their opening night at Portland's Revolution Hall on April 22, 2023, the group was joined by an unknown saxophone player and by Raymond Richards on pedal steel guitar. Richards had played on, engineered and produced Holy Smokes Future Jokes. The April 22 show also had the first ever live performance of "Heroes of Doubt" from the Furr 10th Anniversary bonus disc.

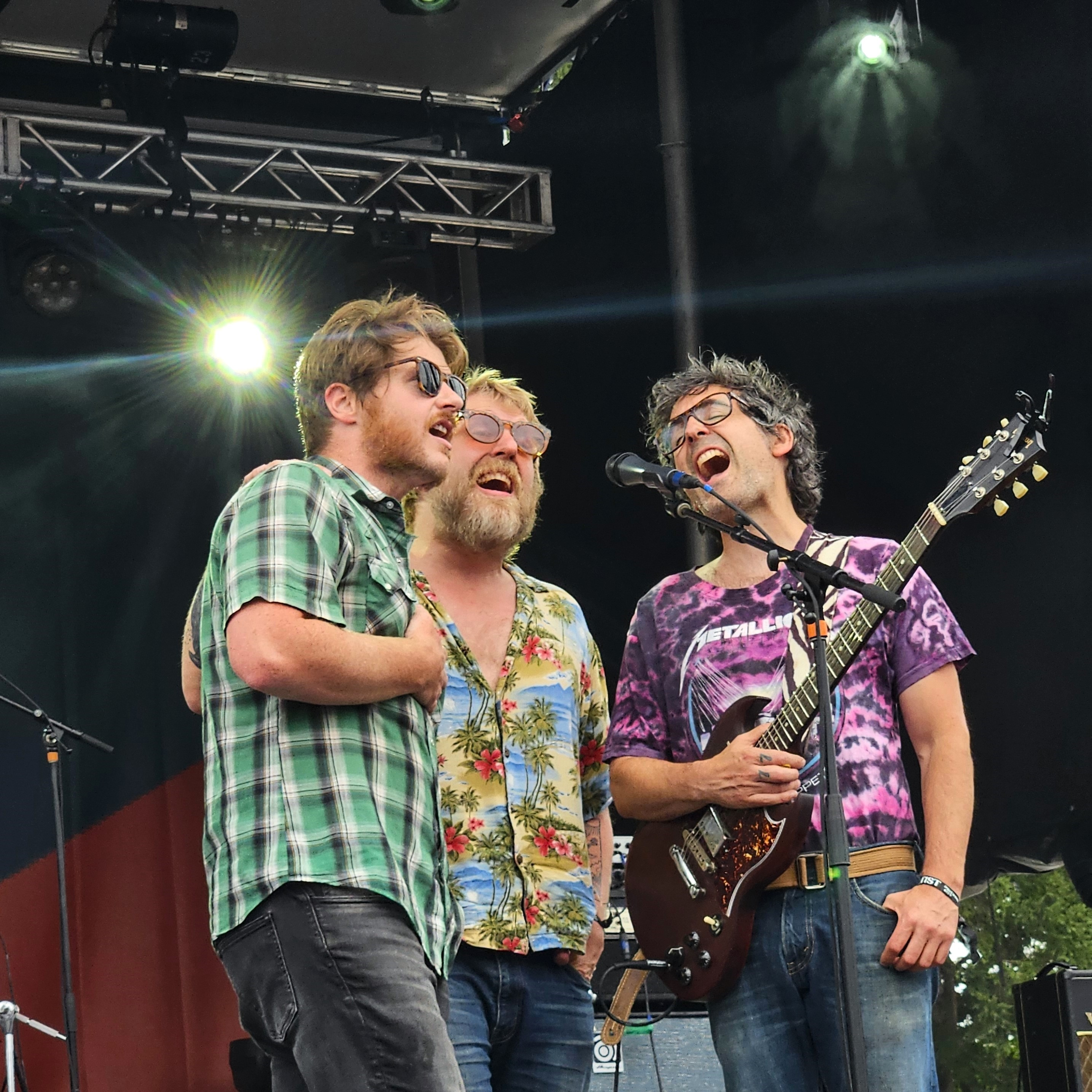
(L to R) Nathan Vanderpool, Brian Adrian Koch and Eric Earley perform "Sin City" a cappella at the In Between Days music festival in Quincy, MA on August 19, 2023

A few weeks later, Blitzen Trapper played a second two-week tour, this time in the U.S. mountain region, with opener Laney Jones. Vanderpool returned to his regular role in place of Blake. On August 19, 2022, Blitzen Trapper opened for Modest Mouse at Pioneer Courthouse Square in downtown Portland. This show included another rare substitute band member, Chris Benson (of Benson Amps) filling in for Michael Elson.

In several concerts from 2022 onward, band members took on new instrumental roles. Brian Koch, who would soon break out as solo singer-guitarist Leo Moon, swapped his drums for Vanderpool's guitar to front the band for Earley's old unreleased song "Fly Low." Another new number featured Earley, Koch and Vanderpool circling one microphone for an a cappella rendition of the Flying Burrito Brothers song "Sin City."

PDX Pop Now!, Vol. 19 came out on October 19, 2022, and included Blitzen Trapper's unreleased "Perusing Janet's Record Collection." No information was published about the history or creation of the poppy, experimental, brass horn sound-heavy track.

In November 2022 and January 2023, Brian Koch shared photos on Instagram of Earley, Vanderpool, and himself recording Blitzen Trapper's upcoming 11th album. A few months later, during an interview with Soul Boat Sessions, he mentioned that the album was completed and would probably surface in spring of 2024.

Blitzen Trapper played again at Pioneer Courthouse Square in August 2023, opening for The Mountain Goats. Later that month, they played outside of the western U.S. for the first time since 2018, in a five-night tour along the Atlantic coast that included the In Between Days music festival in Quincy, MA. The following October, the band briefly returned to the midwestern U.S., most notably in Memphis at Wiseacre Brewery's BAM! Festival that was headlined by country-punk band Lucero.

Before embarking on the east coast tour, Eric Earley announced the release of Cheap Fantastical Takedown, Blitzen Trapper's first new studio release since Holy Smokes Future Jokes three years earlier. The full band performed, with Earley on guitar and lead vocals, Brian Koch on drums, Michael Elson on keyboard, and Nathan Vanderpool and acclaimed singer-songwriter Anna Tivel providing backup vocals. Vanderpool also engineered the recording. BroadwayWorld described the song as "a trippy slice of cosmic Americana" On the front page of BlitzenTrapper.net, Earley described the folky, dark, psychedelic track as "A conversation between two Vampire lovers who've reached a breaking point in their relationship, they've grown weary of immortality, the endless days and nights, flying through the night sky in search of what? Love? Satiation? Their conversation is a window into those contracts we make in past lives that continue into every rebirth and to which we must make account."

The "Cheap Fantastical Takedown" 12-inch single on red vinyl was originally only available at some live shows, followed by a digital release of the A-side on August 29. The vinyl release had a double B-side with the spacey, reflective "Millions of Billions" and the dark, airy piano-based "Ghost & the Snakebite." On October 6, 2023, a limited run of 500 copies of "Cheap Fantastical Takedown" arrived at 54 independent record stores across the United States and Canada, finally followed in November by a very limited online sale on Bandcamp. "Millions of Billions" was released digitally on November 21.

==== 100's of 1000's, Millions of Billions ====
On February 6, 2024, Blitzen Trapper and their label Yep Roc announced that the "highly anticipated" eleventh studio album, 100's of 1000's, Millions of Billions, was due on May 17.

"This whole project grew out of a box of old four-track tapes from the '90s that I found recently," Earley said. "The tapes were full of songs I'd written and recorded back when I was 19 or 20 years old, and the sound and the spirit of those recordings got me excited to start writing music again." To listen to the tapes, he had to borrow a friend's four-track cassette player. Some of these early recordings ended up on 100's of 1000's, Millions of Billions. An entire guitar part from 1999 appears on "View from Jackson Hill". Other songs, such as "Hesher," also contain old cassette sounds.

Earley partly wrote the album by reworking songs from his youth. He felt good about using older material, since he had returned to writing songs the way he did back then: for himself, not for an audience, and "from a place of detachment and a place very seated in the subconscious." Similarly to Blitzen Trapper's previous album, Holy Smokes Future Jokes, he took inspiration from lessons he was learning about humanity through his work with unhoused veterans as well as from Buddhist texts. These included the phrases "hundreds of thousands" and "millions of billions" from the Mahayana sutras. He described these as "a way of gaining perspective on how vast and also how miniscule [sic] things can be."

"It was a phrase I kept seeing as I was slowly going down my rabbit hole of reading, and I was just like, 'Man, what a weird phrase to use a lot for lots of different things.' It really got me thinking about our perception of size and distance, and how things that seem big to an ant seem small to us. Maybe the things that seem big to us, like the cosmos, are super tiny to some other being."

In the years leading up to this album, Earley had adopted many spiritual practices that influenced his songwriting. He often meditated, which sparked the pictures and visual imagery that he wrote from, being a visual songwriter. In 2022, for seven months, he kept a dream journal as a way of tapping into the freewriting flow that he used to have when he was younger. In addition, he re-read the Tibetan Book of the Dead. This ancient text had influenced Holy Smokes Future Jokes, but since then, Earley had a new understanding of it. Many of his songs on 100's of 1000's "were me being like 'oh, that's actually what they're talking about.'"

"My main thing is that I want the sounds and the language to completely and utterly entwine in the energy and the feeling that they give off," said Earley in a May 2024 interview. "So the chord run, the melody, the instruments I'm using – I want those to give you the same feeling as that lyric, as that picture that you're creating with words." He also reflected, "Music is like my journal. It's like – This is what I'm into, this is the thread that I'm following. So if others want to follow me there, that's cool."

In interviews, he shared many of the specific stories that inspired the songs on 100's of 1000's, Millions of Billions.

The opening track, "Ain't Got Time to Fight," is about coping with forces "that push against where the current is trying to take you." Its inspirations are the myths of the Temptation of Buddha by Mara and the Temptation of Christ by the Devil, except that "some Everyday Joe is in that scenario." Then, Earley drew from his own life story for the album's third track, "Cosmic Backseat Education," a "ruminative yet urgent" single with a minimalist, 3-note, chant-like melody. "In America we drive so much, a lot of people's memories stem from being in cars," he said. "I remember lying in the backseat of my parents' car as a kid and just listening to the radio, which I think is where I got most of the education that I've used in my life and my career." He explained further, "It was kind of a secret world you could enter into that was just yours. I think that's important for kids to have their own world, their own mind palace to enter into, feel safe and create things. That's the feeling that I was trying to convey."

Earley wrote the next track, "Hesher," about a bizarre New Yorker who moved to Berlin and traveled with Blitzen Trapper on a Europe tour in 2007 or 2008. "He was this crazy dude who would, like, do cocaine and Viagra together" and was often in wild situations, such as falling straight from the top of a 20-foot half-pipe and nearly dying. But the song is more about Earley's reflection after knowing the man. "I was thinking of that dude, and then thinking, what if he actually had this meaningful relationship somewhere on this tour? And then had to go back home and didn't know what to do. He's kinda torn, but the whole thing is so dreamlike that he can't even tell if it really happened.'"

In the "autobiographical" song "Planetarium," the ghost that Earley sings that he's "been living like" is a Hungry Ghost. It's a creature from Buddhist mythology that tries to eat but can't fill its huge stomach because its throat is so skinny. "I was just craving things so much but didn't really have the ability to really get where I wanted to go," he reflected. "The ambition, the fame, all these things, was the thing that was basically strangling me."

The following track, "Hello Hallelujah," evolved straight from Earley's dream journal, with each verse describing a different dream.

For "Upon the Chain," Earley returned to a family story that had already influenced a different well-known Blitzen Trapper song about "cycles of behavior." For much of his youth, his Uncle Tommy kept getting into trouble and getting out. Earley referred in the song to the time this uncle escaped from a chain gang, stole a car and talked a cop out of a ticket to get to Earley's father's house. Beyond its literal story, the songwriter said that "Upon the Chain" was "about the cycles of behavior that we live through in this incarnation and becoming aware of those cycles. I think most people are addicted to those cycles, and you just remain on that chain that keeps sort of repeating." In the past, the same Uncle Tommy story partially inspired the murder ballad "Black River Killer" from the 2008 album Furr.

The production of 100's of 1000's, Millions of Billions was slower than past albums, taking two months, since the band recorded it on-and-off during Earley's work with unhoused clients. He tracked some of the new material using the same four-track machine that he had borrowed to listen to his old tapes. Drummer Brian Adrian Koch posted photos of the recording sessions on Instagram between November 2022 and January 2023. Earley reflected that the band's lineup change didn't affect his recording process and that "I kind of just use whoever's around," noting that the current group has "really good players, and we kind of go wherever we want musically."

Blitzen Trapper recorded at band member Nathan Vanderpool's studio at a "beautiful property out in the woods up in Washington." This was the first album by their entire post-2019 lineup, with drums by Koch, keyboards by Michael Elson, and backup vocals (plus some lead vocals on "Long Game") by Vanderpool. Anna Tivel added backup vocals and violin. Eric D. Johnson (of Fruit Bats fame) also provided backup vocals, as well as banjo on "Planetarium." During those sessions, Earley wasn't thinking about the track order – mixing engineer D. James Goodwin came up with it later, and Earley approved.

The album's first official single and music video, "Cosmic Backseat Education," emerged along with the album announcement on February 6. This video was the first since 2018's "Dance with Me" to involve the band members themselves. It resembles a twisted children's TV show in a way that Eric Earley described as "Mr. Rogers meets Kill Bill." Rather than simply being puppeteers, the actors in "Cosmic Backseat Education" portray humans who walk around motionlessly, while the puppets that have possessed them are committing crimes. "Everybody says the puppeteer is in control, but everybody knows the puppet is actually calling the shots," said Earley. Mychal Sargent, who previously directed Blitzen Trapper's "Rebel" video, returned to write and direct "Cosmic Backseat Education." Sargent and Koch developed the idea together, with some input from Earley, when they "just wanted to do something silly and fun."

Earley's visual art flourished in connection with 100's of 1000's, Millions of Billions, illustrating the Blitzen Trapper tour posters and the back cover and insert of the LP. His largest art project for this album, though, was the set of drawings he made over two months that emerged on April 16, 2024, as the album's second music video, "Planetarium." "You've just got to accept that it's going to take a while," he said about producing the thousands of line drawings that make up the animation. "I had already done a bunch of animation that I had been messing around with, so I kind of pulled from that. (...) But in a certain sense, I just kind of let it go, followed the thread."

"Planetarium" was followed on May 9 by a third and final single, "Hello Hallelujah." By then, some fans already received the vinyl album, and one had leaked it online.

The cover art of 100's of 1000's, Millions of Billions is the collage Father Collects Fish by Robert Pollard of Guided By Voices. Like the album art for Holy Smokes Future Jokes, it wasn't made for the album; Earley simply saw a picture and liked it. In this case, his manager had to acquire permission to use it.

On May 15, two days before release, Blitzen Trapper's label Yep Roc hosted a virtual listening party on Bandcamp, where Earley and Vanderpool joined fans in the chat. The release weekend kicked off on May 17 with a PNC Live Studio session on 101.9 KINK. Their host Gustav remarked, "This is the first time I've seen a banjo and a Flying V on the same stage." (Earley replied that the Flying V he was playing belonged to his 6-year-old daughter.) They followed up with a concert at Portland's Aladdin Theater. The next day, the band held a free in-store performance and record signing at Seattle's Sonic Boom Records. That night, they held a sold-out concert down the street at Tractor Tavern, where Johnson joined the group on backup vocals and banjo for "Planetarium," as he had on the recording. Small Paul opened on both evenings. Earley shared his gratitude on Instagram a few days later. "Our fans are the best in the world! @smallpaulband delivered every night, kept the jams coming, Mucho indebted to everyone who has bought and/or streamed the new record already."

Distinguished album cover artist Steve Keene painted 75 canvases with his own interpretation of the 100's of 1000's cover art. The paintings were distributed in raffles run by several independent record stores. Keene was a Blitzen Trapper fan who came up with the idea for the project himself.

100's of 1000's, Millions of Billions earned an 80% rating from many music publications including Classic Rock, Americana UK, and Spill Magazine. Tape Op called it "a logical progression from their previous release Holy Smokes Future Jokes" and noted the "70s psych-rock flavored writing and production." EverOut called it "abstract exploration that makes peace with the world's unknowns with exquisite storytelling, sharp imagery, and the band's signature eclectic country-folk-rock sound." Record Store Day Podcast host Paul Myers deemed it a "loose concept album" and said it had been "perfect" to listen to when he drove through the desert because both are "meditative" and give the sense of a "connection with the earth." In addition, Blitzen Trapper's own label Yep Roc announced that the album combined "lo-fi intimacy and trippy psychedelia into a mesmerizing swirl of analog and electronic sounds" and called it "one of the finest works of their career—nearly 20 years in."

The band's sound on 100's of 1000's, Millions of Billions received several comparisons to R.E.M., The Beatles, and Wilco, due to their "musical exploration." Multiple reviews pointed out the "earworms" and how "catchy" the songs are, specifically "Hello Hallelujah" and "Long Game."

Reviewers had mixed opinions about Earley's cryptic songs that are "riddles, even to myself." Glide Magazine said that the "peculiar and enigmatic" music felt like "listening to a friend talk at length about a new discovery, and as happy as you are that it is bringing them joy, you cannot wait for the topic to switch to something you both care about." Americana UK gave a more positive review and simply noted that this album "invites listeners to unravel the riddles for themselves."

Fans from long ago welcomed Blitzen Trapper's comeback, and the album invited much praise for their music across all eras. Regarding their performance on May 25, 2024, at Colorado Springs' Meadowgrass Festival, where they last played 10 years ago, a current writer from the Colorado Bluegrass Music Society said, "when it's time to turn up the volume on the home stereo and let the vinyl spin, I'm throwing on [Blitzen Trapper's 2011 album] American Goldwing." Gustav from 101.9 KINK described their almost 25 years as a band an "amazing run." Interviewer Rachel Locker called Earley "one of the most talented musicians of all time (…) up there with The Beatles, Tom Petty, Bob Dylan" and encouraged him to "never stop creating. We love it. So many people are influenced by your music."

The album release sparked more acceptance for Blitzen Trapper's new sound and new lineup. Reviewer Alex M. Theel pointed out that this record "provides fans with evidence that the additions of Elson and Vanderpool were wise choices." Spill Magazine reflected, "It is always welcome to hear back from them, no matter which direction they would lean towards, with every new release."

In May 2024, Earley said that he still meditated twice a day and would definitely continue during tours. "It's really peaceful and enjoyable," he said. "Especially for someone like me who's spent most of their life being very selfish and unaware of things and being more beast-like, the practice opens me up more." Blitzen Trapper's new album was joined by their announcement of a tour of the U.S. west coast and mountain region that summer. 100's of 1000's, Millions of Billions guest musician Anna Tivel would open for some June shows, and Louisa Stancioff would open for concerts in July. Meanwhile, the band was making plans to return to the midwest and east coast later that year. Even after his hiatus from touring, Earley admitted that going on the road with other great bands and getting inspired by them was "what keeps it fun for me."

== Writing ==
Bandleader Eric Earley, who began playing music at the age of three, writes most of the band's music. On November 16, 2015, American Songwriter magazine named Blitzen Trapper, specifically Earley, the Songwriter of the Week. When asked what his typical songwriting process is like, Earley responded, "It's different for every song. Generally, it just depends on the type of song. If it's a story song, I'll start with the words. If it's not, sometimes it starts with the music, sometimes it's sparked by someone else's song or someone's story they tell me." Earley named Michael Stipe, Son Volt's Jay Farrar, Bob Dylan, and Neil Young as primary songwriting influences.

== Members ==
=== Current members ===
- Eric Earley – lead vocals, lead and rhythm guitar, keyboard, harmonica, banjo (2000–present)
- Brian Adrian Koch – drums, backup and occasional lead vocals, harmonica, guitar (2000–present)
- Michael Elson – bass, keyboard (2022–present)
- Nathan Vanderpool – guitar, backup and occasional lead vocals, bass, drums, banjo (2021–present)
- Michael Blake (substitute) – guitar, keyboard, backup vocals (2021–present)

=== Former members ===
- Erik Menteer – lead, rhythm and slide guitar, percussion, moog synthesizer (2000–2019)
- Michael Van Pelt – bass, bird whistle, percussion, harmonica (2000–2019)
- Marty Marquis – rhythm guitar, backup and occasional lead vocals, keyboard, harmonica, percussion, melodica (2000–2019)
- Drew Laughery – keyboard (2000–2010)

== Discography ==
=== Studio albums ===
| Year | Title | Label |
|---|---|---|
| 2003 | Blitzen Trapper | LidKerCow |
| 2004 | Field Rexx | LidKerCow |
| 2007 | Wild Mountain Nation | LidKerCow / Sub Pop (UK/EU) |
| 2008 | Furr | Sub Pop |
| 2010 | Destroyer of the Void | Sub Pop |
| 2011 | American Goldwing | Sub Pop |
| 2013 | VII | Vagrant / Lojinx |
| 2015 | All Across This Land | Vagrant / Lojinx |
| 2017 | Wild and Reckless | LidKerCow / Lojinx |
| 2020 | Holy Smokes Future Jokes | Yep Roc |
| 2024 | 100's of 1000's, Millions of Billions | Yep Roc |

=== Live albums ===
| Year | Title | Label |
|---|---|---|
| 2014 | Live In Portland | LidKerCow Ltd. |
| 2015 | Live Harvest | Vagrant |
| 2016 | Live at Third Man Records | Third Man |

=== Soundtracks ===
| Year | Title | Label |
|---|---|---|
| 2017 | Wild and Reckless: Soundtrack from the Portland Center Stage Production | LidKerCow Ltd. |

=== Album reissues ===
| Year | Title | Label |
|---|---|---|
| 2013 | Blitzen Trapper Deluxe Reissue | LidKerCow Ltd. |
| 2018 | Furr 10th Anniversary Deluxe Ed. | Sub Pop |

=== Demo albums ===
| Year | Title | Label |
|---|---|---|
| 2021 | Holy Demos Future Demos | Yep Roc |

=== Unreleased recordings ===
| Year | Title | Label |
|---|---|---|
| 2017 | Unreleased Recordings, Vol. 1: Waking Bullets at Breakneck Speed | LidKerCow Ltd. |
| 2020 | Unreleased Recordings, Vol. 2: Too Kool | LidKerCow Ltd. |

=== As Garmonbozia ===
| Year | Title |
|---|---|
| 2000 | untitled |
| 2001 | 1940 |
| 2001 | Perms, Porn and the Gestalt |
| 2001 | Tremolopsi! |
| 2001 | The Omnibus and the Baker's Man (A Pretext for Black Movie Magic) |
| 2002 | Boom |
| 2002 | R / L |
| 2003 | Duble Pepy Majik Plus |
| 2003 | UNRL (EP) |

=== EPs ===
| Year | Title | Label |
|---|---|---|
| 2004 | Blitzen Trapper Advance Album Sampler Promo Thingy | LidKerCow Ltd. |
| 2008 | Cool Love No. 1 | LidKerCow Ltd. |
| 2009 | Black River Killer | Sub Pop |
| 2016 | Mystery and Wonder | Vagrant Records |
| 2018 | Kid's Album! | LidKerCow Ltd. |

=== Vinyl singles ===
| Year | Title | Label |
|---|---|---|
| 2009 | "War is Placebo" / "Booksmart Baby" | Sub Pop |
| 2011 | "Maybe Baby" / "Soul Singer" | Sub Pop |
| 2012 | "Hey Joe" / "Skirts On Fire" | Sub Pop |
| 2014 | "Hold On" / "On a Dime Woman" | Vagrant Records |
| 2023 | "Cheap Fantastical Takedown" / "Millions of Billions" / "Ghost & the Snakebite" | Yep Roc |
