= Josh Fix =

Josh Fix is a South African-born American singer-songwriter, composer, multi-instrumentalist and music producer. In 2008, Fix released his self-produced debut album Free at Last, which saw limited distribution but nevertheless garnered praise in the press, and, among other accolades, found itself on Time Out New York's "Best Rock Albums of 2008" list. Associate Editor Hank Shteamer called Fix a "post-Radiohead Elton John [who] obliterated slacker chic with a virtuosically glossy piano-pop opus."

Fix's most recent release, a mini-album This Town Is Starting To Make Me Angry (2009) was released in Europe through British indie label Lojinx.

In 2009 he wrote the official theme for And Another Thing..., the sixth installment of Douglas Adams's The Hitchhiker's Guide to the Galaxy "trilogy."

The song "Barely Insane" was used in the Season 2 episode of 90210 "And Away They Go."

== Discography ==
=== Studio Recordings ===
- 2004: Steinway The Hard Way (EP)
- 2008: Free at Last
- 2009: This Town Is Starting To Make Me Angry (EP)
- 2010: From the Artemis Fowl series (Disney-Hyperion Books): "Complex: Atlantis" (Single); "Call Me Artemis Fowl" (Single)
