= Black River Killer =

EP by Blitzen Trapper
- Released: August 25, 2009
- Genre: Alternative country
- Length: 17:32
- Label: Sub Pop

Blitzen Trapper chronology
Furr (2008)	Black River Killer (2009)	Destroyer of the Void (2010)

Professional ratings
Aggregate scores
Source	Rating
Metacritic	68/100
Review scores
Source	Rating
Consequence of Sound	4.5/5 stars
Contact Music	5/10 stars
MusicOMH	3/5 stars
NOW	5/5 stars
PopMatters	6/10 stars
Under the Radar	6/10 stars

Black River Killer is an EP by American band Blitzen Trapper, released on August 25, 2009. It features previously released track "Black River Killer" from their 2008 album, Furr, as well as 6 songs previously unreleased.

The 12" version was released on October 6, 2009.

== Track listing ==
All songs written by Eric Earley.

No.	Title	Length
1.	"Black River Killer"	3:28
2.	"Silver Moon"	2:46
3.	"Going Down"	2:22
4.	"Shoulder Full of You"	2:17
5.	"Preacher's Sister's Boy"	1:58
6.	"Black Rock"	1:57
7.	"Big Black Bird"	2:47
