= Anna Tivel =

American singer-songwriter

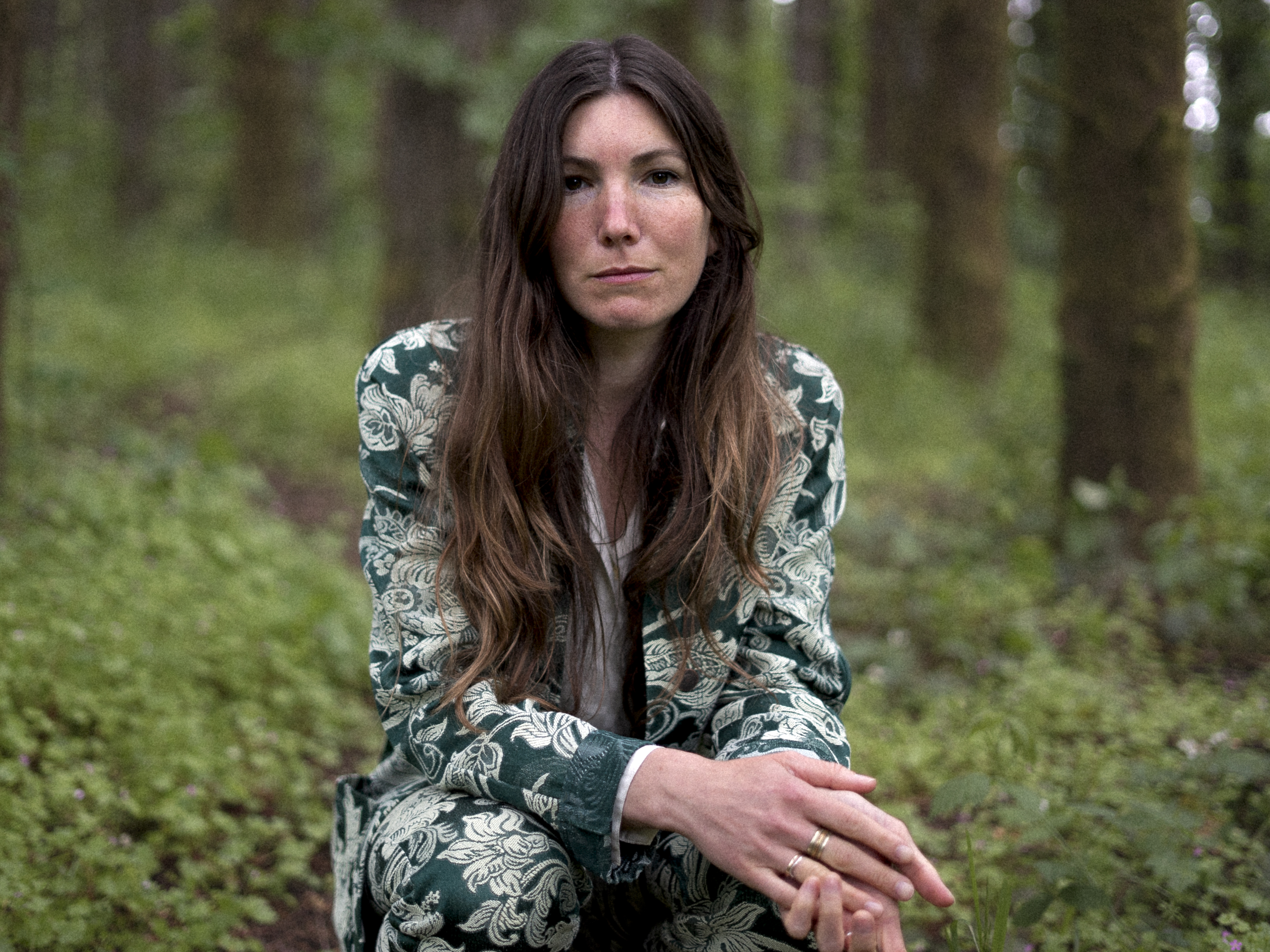
- Tivel in 2022

Background information
- Origin: Portland, Oregon, United States
- Genres: Indie folk; alternative folk; folk; Americana
- Occupations: Singer; songwriter; musician
- Instruments: Vocals; violin; guitar
- Years active: 2011–present
- Labels: Fluff & Gravy Records
- Website: www.annativel.com

Anna Tivel is an American indie folk artist from Portland, Oregon. Her songwriting and storytelling have been widely praised, with critics describing her as one of the finest songwriters of her generation. Her work has drawn comparisons to that of Big Thief's Adrianne Lenker.

Tivel has released six studio albums of new original songs on the Portland-based label Fluff & Gravy Records and one with Mama Bird Recording Co. She also regularly records and releases alternative or acoustic versions of her past work.

Tivel's 2022 album Outsiders received multiple Best of Year accolades from NPR Music, including "Best Roots Music of 2022" and "Best Songs of 2022" (for single "Black Umbrella"). Living Thing was ranked the #1 album of 2024 by Folk Alley, and 2025's Animal Poem received a 7.6 rating from Pitchfork.

Tivel made her debut on NPR's Tiny Desk in May 2023 and at Newport Folk Festival in July 2025.

== Biography ==
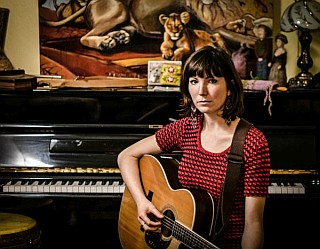
Anna Tivel with her guitar

Tivel was born in La Conner, Washington and grew up in a musical family, learning violin and fiddle as a child. After moving to Portland at age 18, she developed an interest in songwriting and began to write and perform her own material. Her songs are often vignettes about the lives and struggles of ordinary people, described by critics as character-driven poems. She said in an interview, "I'm drawn over and over to the small stories of people (myself included) just trying to get by, to do a little better, to feel some sort of beauty in an ugly world."

Tivel's third album Small Believer was released on September 29, 2017 by Fluff & Gravy Records and named a "Top 10 underheard album of 2017" by Ann Powers of NPR Music. She followed it with The Question on April 19, 2019, which was called "one of the most ambitious folk records of 2019" by NPR and listed among "10 essential folk albums from 2019" by Paste Magazine. Later that year, Rolling Stone named Tivel as one of the best acts they saw at AmericanaFest in Nashville, writing, "In a week of countless songsmiths showcasing their attempt at that exact type of singer-songwriter storytelling, Tivel's winding, largely chorus-less tales shined and shimmered."

On July 16, 2021, Tivel shared Blue World, a compilation of re-recorded alternative versions of songs from her other albums.

Tivel's album Outsiders was released on August 19, 2022 via Mama Bird Recording Co and received multiple Best of Year accolades from NPR Music, including "Best Roots Music of 2022," "Best Songs of 2022" (for single "Black Umbrella"), "Ann Powers' Top Album of 2022," and "Bob Boilen's Favorite Music of 2022." Upon release, critic Ann Powers said on-air, "Her writing on this record is at the level Paul Simon was at when he wrote 'The Boxer' and 'American Tune.'" Roots music journal No Depression wrote in a review, "It's tempting to think of her as a poet with an exceptional gift for playing guitar and singing."

Tivel's NPR Tiny Desk concert premiered on May 22, 2023 with Powers commenting, "Tivel's remarkable empathy elevates her folk-based, jazz-touched compositions from mere stories to secular prayers."

Tivel returned to Fluff & Gravy Records to release Living Thing on May 31, 2024. It was ranked the #1 album of 2024 by Folk Alley and gained praise from KEXP for expanding the sounds of her previous work: "Living Thing finds Tivel building upon her brand of folk music with richly layered guitar, violin, field recordings, keys and programmed loops with a pop sensibility to accompany her excellent storytelling."

Tivel made her Newport Folk Festival debut in July 2025 after being invited to play by Nathaniel Rateliff.

Tivel’s seventh studio album Animal Poem was released on August 29, 2025 via Fluff & Gravy Records. NPR included it in their New Music Friday broadcast with WMOT's Jessie Scott aligning her work with that of beat poets. Pitchfork gave the album a 7.6 rating, calling Tivel "a wizard on par with The Weather Station at turning nature into a character unto itself."

Tivel recorded Animal Poem live in a circle with friends, including fellow Portland artist and co-producer Sam Weber. She has said it was made in conversation: everyone together in the room, listening and responding in real time without the separation of walls and headphones. She has described the album as a reflection on sustaining a creative life amid political division, technological change, and economic inequality, and as her contribution to what she calls a communal creative story shared by ordinary people.

Tivel performed for the first time at Big Ears Festival and Willie Nelson's Luck Reunion in March 2026.

== Discography ==
- Brimstone Lullaby (2012) (as Anna and the Underbelly)
- Before Machines (2014)
- Heroes Waking Up (2016)
- Small Believer (2017)
- The Question (2019)
- Blue World (2021)
- Outsiders (2022)
- Living Thing (2024)
- Animal Poem (2025)
