= Hannah Schneider =

Danish musician and composer

- Origin: Copenhagen, Denmark
- Years active: 1999–present
- Labels: Sony/Mermaid, Lojinx
- Website: hannahschneider.dk

Hannah Schneider is a Danish musician and composer signed to Sony/Mermaid records in Denmark and Lojinx in the UK. She has released three albums and toured in Europe and America.

Schneider is the granddaughter of famed ‘cellist Mischa Schneider, a member of the Budapest String Quartet. Her self-titled debut album was released in Denmark in 2012 followed by Me Vs. I in 2009, both self produced. Her 3rd album, Red Lines, is the first to be released in the UK, following the Lay Of The Land compilation EP in 2014.

Schneider co-wrote the song "The Absence of Your Company" with Kim Richey, who recorded it for her 2007 album Chinese Boxes. The song was featured in US TV series Grey's Anatomy

In October 2014 Clash Magazine premiered Dreaming Kind as the first video from her forthcoming album Red Lines.

She has been nominated for several awards like Zulu Awards, for best female artist and also New Act.

Since 2016 Hannah has been part of the electronic duo AyOwA together with Nicolai Kornerup. AyOwA has released two EPs, Eremit (2017) and Farvel (2018).

In 2017 AyOwA played Roskilde Festival and Spot Festival.

== Discography ==
=== Albums ===
Year	Album	Peak positions	Certification
Year	Album	DEN	Certification
2009	Hannah Schneider	–	
2011	Window Sessions (2011)	–	
2012	Me vs. I (2012)	27	
2014	Red Lines	37	
2022	Ocean Letters	–	

Others

- 2014: Lay of the Land
