= Cool Love No. 1 =

Cool Love #1

EP by Blitzen Trapper
- Released: September 19, 2008
- Genre: Alternative country
- Label: Lidkercow Ltd./Sub Pop

Cool Love #1 is a 7 Inch EP by American country band Blitzen Trapper, released on September 19, 2008.

== Track listing ==
1. "Cool Love #1"
2. "Boss King"
3. "Jericho"
4. "Jesus on the Mainline"
