= Montana (band) =

Australian band

- Origin: Sydney, New South Wales, Australia
- Genres: Indie pop; indie rock
- Years active: 1997–present
- Labels: Lojinx; Laughing Outlaw; Rock Indiana; Polaris/MVS
- Members: Patrick Carr; Paul Scott; Tim Denny; Adam Griffiths
- Past members: Michelle Margherita; Steve Melville; Jonny Gardiner
- Website: montana-music.com

Montana are an Australian indie pop band. They released two albums internationally – Bubblegum Love (2001), and Starsign: Tarantula (2006).

== History ==
Montana formed in Sydney in 1997 and in the following year they issued a self-titled extended play with five tracks including "Koolest Band" on Velvet Sound Recordings.

Montana's music was used in films (Drive Me Crazy, Feed) and on TV (Big Brother Australia, Tripping Over, Kath & Kim). "Cradle Song" from Bubblegum Love was broadcast on Radio National's Late Night Live in September 2001.

According to then-band member, Jonny Gardiner, during 2000 "I met the Montana kids in L.A when I was there with Jon Stevens. They played the Whiskey a Go Go and other cool joints and asked me to join the band when we got home to Sydney. We hooked up with producer John Haeny (The Doors, Jackson Brown) and went into pre production for almost a year then into Velvet Sound, Festival & 301 to record and mix" their debut album, Bubblegum Love. Steve Neville was replaced on drums by Tim Denny (ex-Navahodads) in 2001. In 2003 Michelle Margherita, on vocals and bass guitar, left Montana to join United Kingdom group, Farrah, which according to that band's Jez Ashurst was because "she was bored with life in Sydney... I sent her our record; she said she liked it and could she come and join us."

Pete Whalley of Get Ready to Rock rated Starsign: Tarantula at four-and-a-half out of five and explained, "[they] peddle a brand of perfect indie pop... There's no denying that there's some pretty perfect pop here. But this reviewer, at least, was left wondering whether the target audience is the teen market dominated by Busted and then McFly, or a more mature rock audience." Jodie Woodgate of RoomThirteen felt it was "lodged in pop heaven, creating music that unashamedly harbours desires to deliver the perfect slice of indie pop, unleashing hooks that are usually only found on a pop addled track before mixing in cheery melodies strapped to sun drenched beats. Its bright and breezy pop that will have your feet tapping along chirpily, injecting some much needed sunshine into the winter months before quickly exiting on a stolen Weezer guitar riff." The group promoted the album with a United Kingdom tour in March–April 2007.

== Members ==
- Patrick Carr – guitar, vocals
- Tim Denny – drums, vocals (2001–present)
- Adam Griffiths – bass guitar, vocals
- Paul Scott – guitar, lead vocals
- Michelle Margherita – vocals, bass guitar (1997–2003)
- Steve Melville – drums (1997–2001)
- Jonny Gardiner – guitar (2000–01)

== Discography ==
=== Albums ===
- Bubblegum Love (21 September 2001) Rock Indiana (Cindi 153)
  - Bubblegum Love (with Extra Love) (2005)Lojinx (LJX007CD)
- Starsign: Tarantula (2006) Lojinx (LJX009CD)
