= Live in Portland =

Live In Portland

Live album by Blitzen Trapper
- Released: December 17, 2014
- Genre: Rock
- Length: 78:00
- Label: LidKerCow
- Producer: Martin Gonzalez & Marty Marquis

Blitzen Trapper chronology
VII (2013)	Live In Portland (2014)	Live Harvest (2015)

Live In Portland is the first live album from the Portland, Oregon-based rock band Blitzen Trapper. It was released as a "name your price" download as through the website Bandcamp through Blitzen Trapper's own label, LidKerCow. The album was available to download in multiple formats, including MP3, FLAC, ALAC (Apple Lossless), AAC, or Ogg Vorbis, and available for unlimited streaming for paid customers via the Bandcamp app. All tracks were recorded during the band's two-night stand at the Doug Fir Lounge on November 29–30, 2013.

Eric Earley described the record as a "gift" to fans: "As much as I love studio recording, the live show is where it's at these days. So much of what Blitzen Trapper means is contained in our live shows, in the energy we try to convey and the stories I'm telling. This is our first release of any live material and it's got everything I like about our live show, it's intimate, it's messy and it's grounded in our interaction on stage, just these guys that grew up together playing songs and messing around on a stage. This is for all the fans who've seen us and know that when we're performing we're trying to give as much as we possibly can. So it's also our gift to the fans, a free live thing for the Holidays. Hope you all enjoy it as much as we did playing it."

== Reception ==
Critical reception for Live In Portland was positive. Jacob Tollefson from the site Surviving the Golden Age stated, "Blitzen Trapper's Live in Portland is an ode to 60's and 70's arena rock that has managed to capture the same energy of classic bands like The Allman Brothers Band. The live nature of the album also contributes to the "tight but loose" feel that is so unique to bands from that era. Dueling lead guitars meeting between a solid base that is set by the rhythm paint the picture of classic southern rock that Blitzen Trapper executes excellently." Ground Zero said, "Live in Portland"... really conveys an excellent band doing its thing live." A major rave came from the site Well-Lighted Etcetera: "One thing remains undoubtedly certain. Blitzen Trapper's brand of cross-eyed, country drunk, indie rock and blues satisfies like few other concoctions down your radio dial ... this is a rare live album that manages to capture the band at the height of their powers. Whether live or on wax, these five guys give Portland something to boast about."

== Production credits ==
- Produced by Martin Gonzalez & Marty Marquis
- Recorded by Chad Anderson and Jordan Inglee
- Mixed by Martin Gonzalez
- Mastered by Timothy Stollenwerk at Stereophonic
- Photography by Meredith Adelaide
- Management by Brady Brock & Danny Goldberg for Gold Village Entertainment

== Track listing and song selection ==
The tracks selected for this record are spread fairly evenly from Blitzen Trapper's career, with their commercial breakthrough Furr garnering the largest representation. One song from the Cool Love #1 EP, 2 songs from Wild Mountain Nation, 3 songs from VII, 5 songs from American Goldwing, and 6 songs from Furr. Live In Portland features no songs from Blitzen Trapper, Field Rexx, or Destroyer of the Void.

All songs written by Eric Earley, with the exception of "Jericho," written by Marty Marquis.

No.	Title	Length
1.	"Fletcher"	4:24
2.	"Astronaut"	3:58
3.	"Thirsty Man"	9:04
4.	"Jericho"	2:43
5.	"Shine On"	5:06
6.	"Black River Killer"	3:33
7.	"Lady On the Water"	3:13
8.	"Furr"	5:04
9.	"Not Your Lover"	3:04
10.	"American Goldwing"	3:05
11.	"God and Suicide"	2:32
12.	"Valley of Death"	3:14
13.	"Sleepy Time In The Western World"	3:57
14.	"Wild Mountain Nation"	3:32
15.	"Miss Spiritual Tramp"	3:27
16.	"Might Find It Cheap"	4:14
17.	"Street Fighting Sun"	13:55
