= Field Rexx =

Studio album by Blitzen Trapper
- Released: November 23, 2004
- Genre: Alternative country
- Length: 40:59
- Label: LidKerCow

Blitzen Trapper chronology
| Blitzen Trapper (2003) | Field Rexx (2004) | Wild Mountain Nation (2007) |

Professional ratings
Review scores
| Source | Rating |
|---|---|
| Pitchfork | 7/10 |

Field Rexx is the second studio album by Blitzen Trapper. It was "made in the sweltering summer of 2004 with no budget amidst the hiss of flies and tape."

== Track listing ==
Preview This Album

| No. | Title | Length |
|---|---|---|
| 1. | "James & Larry Earley (1982)" | 0:28 |
| 2. | "Lux & Royal Shopper" | 3:23 |
| 3. | "Love I Exclaim!" | 1:20 |
| 4. | "Summer Twin" | 3:29 |
| 5. | "Cold Gold Diamond" | 2:38 |
| 6. | "Concrete Heaven (live at Tecumseh Natl. Balast)" | 5:54 |
| 7. | "40 Stripes" | 3:51 |
| 8. | "Asleep for Days" | 3:15 |
| 9. | "Dreamers & Giants" | 3:33 |
| 10. | "Turkey in the Straw (James 1982)" | 0:25 |
| 11. | "Dirty Pearls" | 2:09 |
| 12. | "Leopard's Will to Live" | 3:32 |
| 13. | "Country Rain" | 2:36 |
| 14. | "Moving Minors Over County Lines" | 2:44 |
| 15. | "Love (reprise feat. Pookie & 2TanClan)" | 1:44 |
