= Wild Mountain Nation =

Studio album by Blitzen Trapper
- Released: June 12, 2007
- Genre: Alternative country
- Length: 33:43
- Label: Sub Pop

Blitzen Trapper chronology
Field Rexx (2004)	Wild Mountain Nation (2007)	Furr (2008)

Professional ratings
Aggregate scores
Source	Rating
Metacritic	82/100
Review scores
Source	Rating
AllMusic	4/5 stars
Christgau’s Consumer Guide	A−
Cokemachineglow	81%
Drowned in Sound	8/10
The Guardian	4/5 stars
Tom Hull	B
The Line of Best Fit	90%
MusicOMH	4/5 stars
Pitchfork	8.5/10
PopMatters	7/10

Wild Mountain Nation is the third studio album by Blitzen Trapper. The album was honored as "Best New Music" by Pitchfork, receiving a rating of 8.5 out of 10.

Sub Pop Records describes the album as such:

From outerspace to down at the farm, campfire singalong to dystopic atonal deconstruction, Wild Mountain Nation presents a raucous and varied constellation of favorite souvenirs from the Trapper musical adventures. Brought forth in a spasm of creative mania, Nation is rough-hewn but lush, crackling (sometimes audibly) with a weird and lucid energy. The album was recorded and arranged by the band themselves, using a dizzying variety of techniques and media, including a secret process learned from friendly extraterrestrials. As always, though, the group’s trusty four-track was used to capture the “soul”, “essence”, or “kernel” of each song, which was then buried in a rich humus of articulation, embellishment, and attenuation, so that after the summer a nutritious, colorful variety of fresh music was drooping from the vine (so to speak). A rich harvest: dusty bones, sunrise, Philip K Dick, Guernica, barley wine, sycamore or doug fir, snowflake, Sally Mack’s School of Dance, Scooby-Doo, bigfoot.

== Track listing ==
All songs written by Eric Earley.

No.	Title	Length
1.	"Devil's A-Go-Go"	3:02
2.	"Wild Mountain Nation"	2:42
3.	"Futures & Folly"	2:14
4.	"Miss Spiritual Tramp"	2:59
5.	"Woof & Warp of the Quiet Giant's Hem"	2:48
6.	"Sci-Fi Kid"	3:04
7.	"Wild Mtn. Jam"	1:05
8.	"Hot Tip/Tough Cub"	3:27
9.	"The Green King Sings"	3:16
10.	"Summer Town"	2:24
11.	"Murder Babe"	2:51
12.	"Country Caravan"	2:04
13.	"Badger's Black Brigade"	1:47
