= Blitzen Trapper (album) =

Studio album by Blitzen Trapper
- Released: November 25, 2003
- Genres: Folk, rock, country
- Length: 38:32
- Label: LidKerCow

Blitzen Trapper chronology
Blitzen Trapper (2003)	Field Rexx (2004)

Blitzen Trapper is the debut studio album by Blitzen Trapper. The deluxe reissue was released only on vinyl LP on April 20, 2013, for Record Store Day.

== Track listing ==
Preview This Album

No.	Title	Length
1.	"The All-Girl Team"	3:13
2.	"Cunning Revolution"	4:23
3.	"Appletrees"	4:13
4.	"Reno"	3:32
5.	"Whiskey Kisser"	3:23
6.	"Triggafinga"	4:48
7.	"Ansel & Emily DeSader"	3:09
8.	"Cracker Went Down"	1:50
9.	"Christmas Is Coming Soon"	3:04
10.	"Donkie Boy"	3:00
11.	"Texaco"	3:57

2013 Deluxe Edition Bonus Tracks

No.	Title	Length
12.	"Pink Padded Slippers"	2:43
13.	"Crackerjack Tattoo"	3:54
14.	"Flying Trapeze"	2:45
15.	"Rainy Day"	3:07
16.	"On a Tuesday"	2:38
