= American Goldwing =

Studio album by Blitzen Trapper
- Released: September 13, 2011
- Genre: Alternative country
- Length: 37:38
- Label: Sub Pop

Blitzen Trapper chronology
Destroyer of the Void (2010)	American Goldwing (2011)	VII (2013)

American Goldwing is the sixth studio album by Portland, Oregon-based band Blitzen Trapper, released on September 13, 2011 on Sub Pop Records. Described by Rolling Stone magazine as "full of Dylan mysticism, spidery acoustic Dead jamming, tasty 1970s rock moves and evocations of high-plains drifters with itchy trigger fingers drinking from jam jars," the album went on to placing at #104 on the Billboard 200, #32 on Top Rock Albums, #20 on the Alternative Albums chart, #19 on the Tastemaker chart, and as high as #4 on the Folk Albums chart. It was the band's last album with label SubPop, which they had been with since their breakthrough studio album, 2008's Furr.

== Conception ==
"I usually write songs pretty fast, in like 20-30 minutes," Eric Earley said. "For the new record [American Goldwing] I wrote them all in a month or so. I'm not a good deliberator, I get out a guitar and it comes to me." In his Sub Pop assessment of the band and his own songwriting, Earley indicates a tragedy, "a death of which I can’t speak," spurring on the writing and recording of the album. "Writing American Goldwing felt much ... like being pinned beneath a giant motorcycle, and its vision is that inescapable past, those feelings of being trapped in a small town, that fine line between the rural and the suburban settings that define much of America, that line between love and loss that occurs when you find yourself 'taking it easy too long / sticking around this lonesome town.' It’s me trying to hazard a true American nostalgia."

The recording of the album also came relatively quickly, in the midst of publicity for their previous album: "I wrote American Goldwing ... in a span of six months, recorded most of it, and then we went on tour for Destroyer of the Void. We did more TV, including the Jimmy Fallon show, and we played for the biggest crowds we’d ever performed for at festivals through the summer (Lollapalooza, Newport Folk Festival, etc.), all the time knowing that this new record I’d recorded was the real record, the Blitzen Trapper record to come."

Despite the very personal nature of the songwriting (Earley even indicated that the record had originally been intended as a solo effort), American Goldwing became the first Blitzen Trapper album to which creators outside the band were invited to collaborate. Bassist Michael Van Pelt suggested bringing in Grammy-winning producer and audio engineer Tchad Blake to mix the album, and Portland-based producer Gregg Williams (Quarterflash, The Dandy Warhols) co-produced all the tracks on the record.

== Pre-Release ==
On July 7, 2011, the album's title track was released for download on Sub Pop's website. Additionally, SubPop released two trailer videos for the album, one straightforward clip featuring Earley riding in the back of a truck, underscored by musical snippets of "Might Find it Cheap"and "Stranger in a Strange Land", and a more surreal movie-trailer video, featuring a narrator with a spooky-seductive French accent, murderous clowns, and bodies floating in swimming pools, based around "Street Fighting Sun".

Director and photographer Rich Tarbell directed a series of live performances for WNRN, a public radio station based in Charlottesville, Virginia. Finally, in anticipation of the new full-length record, the band once again participated in Record Store Day on April 16, 2011, offering the 7" vinyl single, "Maybe Baby/Soul Singer." Only 1500 copies of the single were produced, and all came with a download code.

On September 13, 2011 – American Goldwing's release date – the band played an in-store live set of mostly new tracks (and one Led Zeppelin cover) at Easy Street Records in Seattle, Washington.

== Reception ==
American Goldwing debuted to mostly strong reviews. PopMatters celebrated the record, stating, "On American Goldwing, Blitzen Trapper remains true to itself—still inspired by its heroes, still fusing old sounds with new, and still compelling ... framed within a warm nostalgia for a kind of imagined, bygone America ... the stronger songs here can stand alongside Blitzen Trapper’s finest work to date." Paste agreed with this assessment, saying, "American Goldwing is home to some of the most immediately catchy songs they’ve produced in a career ... Songs ... radiate an abstract joy—the kind of tie-loosened fun that comes from the simple pleasure of being in a rock ’n’ roll band, basking in the chemistry of playing with some of your best friends, and making the music you absolutely want to make."

AllMusic pegged the record as "a straight-up, mid-'70s inspired Southern rock album that fuses the Saturday night swagger of Lynyrd Skynyrd with the stoic peasantry of The Band," while Rolling Stone called it an "intoxicating roots fantasy." An essay from Leacock's Alexander Hamilton titled, "Why American Goldwing is Awesome," compares the album to Led Zeppelin's fourth album, concluding with, "American Goldwing is an album that sets out to do what it claims to do ... [it] is in fact a carefully thought-out return to a timeless musical era."

== Track listing ==
All songs written by Eric Earley.

No.	Title	Length
1.	"Might Find It Cheap"	3:12
2.	"Fletcher"	3:27
3.	"Love the Way You Walk Away"	3:39
4.	"Your Crying Eyes"	3:00
5.	"My Home Town"	2:38
6.	"Girl In a Coat"	3:39
7.	"American Goldwing"	3:08
8.	"Astronaut"	4:08
9.	"Taking It Easy Too Long"	2:56
10.	"Street Fighting Sun"	4:39
11.	"Stranger In a Strange Land"	3:16

== Credits ==
- Produced by Eric Earley and Gregg Williams
- Recorded by Gregg Williams
- Mixed by Tchad Blake
- Mastered by Greg Calbi
- Design by Sohale Kevin Darouian
