= Doug Fir Lounge =

Bar and restaurant in Portland, Oregon, U.S.

- Logo

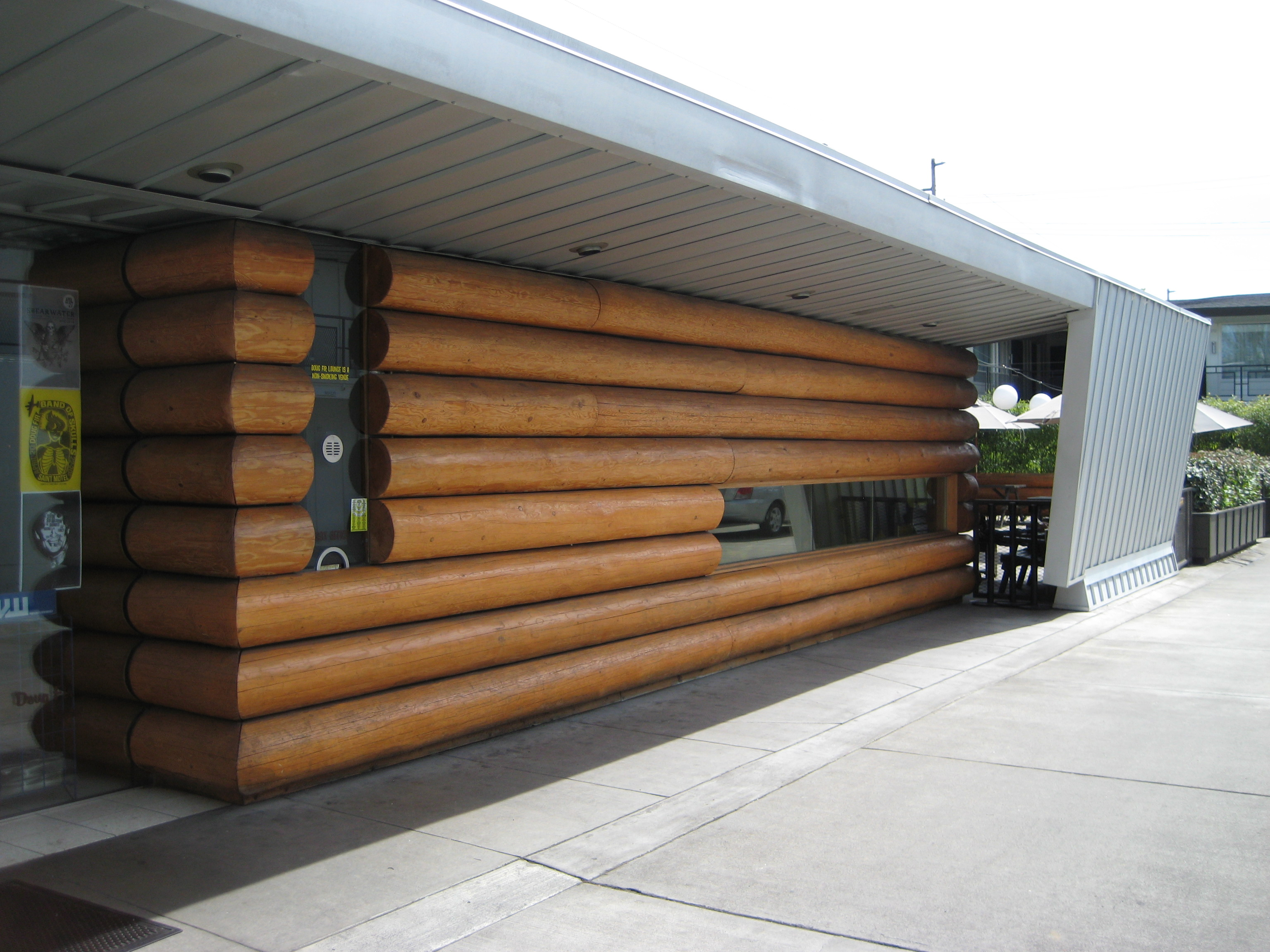
- The venue's exterior in 2010

- Location within Portland, Oregon
- Address: 830 East Burnside Street
- Location: Portland, Oregon, U.S.
- Coordinates: 45°31′21.6″N 122°39′24.5″W

Website
- dougfirlounge.com

The Doug Fir Lounge was a bar and restaurant housed within the ground level of the Jupiter Hotel, in Portland, Oregon's Buckman neighborhood, in the United States. It has been planning to relocate and re-open since 2023, but opening has not been determined as of July 2026.

== Description and history ==
The venue was established in 2004 and operated in the basement of Jupiter Hotel until 2023.

In 2023, the venue announced intent to relocate to the space which previously housed Le Bistro Montage. The opening timeline has not been established. Speculated opening timeline have been repeatedly set back.

== Reception ==
Doug Fir Lounge won in the "Best Music Venue" category of Willamette Week's "Best of Portland Readers' Poll 2020".

== See also ==
- Culture of Portland, Oregon
