= Destroyer of the Void =

Studio album by Blitzen Trapper
- Released: June 8, 2010
- Genre: Alternative country
- Length: 45:56
- Label: Sub Pop

Blitzen Trapper chronology
Black River Killer (2009)	Destroyer of the Void (2010)	American Goldwing (2011)

Destroyer of the Void is the fifth studio album by Blitzen Trapper released on June 8, 2010 on Sub Pop Records. Following their commercial breakthrough, Furr, Destroyer was a hit in its own right. Destroyer of the Void put Blitzen Trapper in the top 100 of Billboard's Top 200 chart for the first time - peaking at #88 - while the album had even more success on the Top Independent Album charts, hitting #11 there.

Unusually, lead songwriter and singer Eric Earley didn't title the album, which was named by multi-instrumentalist Marty Marquis. Earley admitted, "I couldn’t think of a name for it."

Professional ratings
Aggregate scores
Source	Rating
Metacritic	76/100
Review scores
Source	Rating
AllMusic	3.5/5 stars
Consequence of Sound	1.5/5 stars
Pitchfork	7.5/10 stars
PopMatters	8/10 stars
Spectrum Culture	4.0/5 stars
Spin	3.5/5 stars
War on Pop	7.0/10 stars

== Conception and critical reception ==
Coming off the extended tour for Blitzen Trapper's commercial breakthrough, Furr, lead singer and songwriter Eric Earley had already begun work on the new album explaining, "I had already cobbled together a new record during the previous year of touring, Destroyer of the Void, a patchwork of songs from my past and present which hung together like a house of cards. But there were certain glimmers of where Blitzen Trapper was heading, a certain feeling of open road and of heartfelt loss. Having turned this in, we spent half of 2010 doing nothing, hanging around Portland, revisiting our earlier, less ambitious days of drinking and getting into trouble."

Of the multi-part title song, Earley stated, "['Destroyer of the Void'] was originally three different songs and the way the track ended up was really just a result of me experimenting in the studio and trying to create something conceptual in a way I haven't before." Critique site AllMusic elaborated on the experimental nature of the eponymous track, saying that it was, "the Portland, Oregon-based sextet's most challenging song to date, a sprawling, six-minute, prog rock epic that will draw forth from the lips of critics names like Queen, Bowie, ELO, Tull, and the Beatles."; the remainder of the review praised the album as a whole: "there's enough meat on these bones to suggest that the band hasn't lost its knack for crafting spiritually charged, enigmatic woodcuts of 21st century Americana."

Most reviews were positive, with Pitchfork applauding the album's sound: "Blitzen Trapper's version of Americana is one of the most melodic and playful (and least affectedly twangy) since Being There-era Wilco, and Eric Earley uses his craggy Dylanesque voice to add grit to his more featherweight melodies." PopMatters was even more effusive: "...the band manages to find a sense of collective unity between tracks, something Furr failed to do. Destroyer of the Void is more consistent and inventive, from its beefed-up production to its refreshing instrumentation (most striking: the spine chilling graveyard harmonicas and psychedelic, effects-drenched guitar solos). This time, Blitzen Trapper have made an album you can listen to front to back in one sitting, not just a collection of great but unrelated moments."

== Recording and song selection ==
Several of the songs, including "The Ballad of the Burning Tongue" and "The Eagle with the Head of a Ram" were cut from the album; Eric Earley later hinted that they might become commercially available as bonus tracks on a future record, saying, "Those two tracks I really should have put on DOV."

== Track listing ==
All songs written by Eric Earley.

1. "Destroyer of the Void" - 6:17
2. "Laughing Lover" - 3:09
3. "Below the Hurricane" - 5:26
4. "The Man Who Would Speak True" - 3:07
5. "Love and Hate" - 3:23
6. "Heaven and Earth" - 3:44
7. "Dragon's Song" - 3:02
8. "The Tree" (feat. Alela Diane) - 3:35
9. "Evening Star" - 3:42
10. "Lover Leave Me Drowning" - 3:26
11. "The Tailor" - 3:20
12. "Sadie" - 3:40

Bonus track

13. "Simple Tree" - (Bonus Track) - 2:30
