= Lojinx =

- Founded: 2004
- Founder: Andrew Campbell
- Distributor(s): The Orchard, Essential Music & Marketing
- Genre: Indie, Rock, Electronic, Americana
- Country of origin: United Kingdom
- Location: London
- Official website: http://www.lojinx.com

Lojinx is a British independent record label and music publishing company established in 2004 in South London, UK. It was voted as one of the top ten "Best Record Labels of 2010". Based in London, Lojinx markets and distributes physical and digital music products globally via The Orchard.

== Artists ==
- Astral Drive
- The Bad Machines
- Ben Lee
- Bill DeMain
- Blitzen Trapper
- Bleu
- Brendan Benson
- Butch Walker
- Caroline Lost
- Calvin Harris
- The Click Five
- David Mead
- David Myhr
- El May
- Eric Burdon & The Greenhornes
- Farrah
- Fountains of Wayne
- Graham Gouldman
- Fred Abbott
- Henrik
- Josh Fix
- The Posies
- Hannah Schneider
- Ken Stringfellow
- Kim Richey
- The Lost Brothers
- Mike Viola
- Montana
- Nina Persson
- Pugwash
- Sally Seltmann
- Nate Campany
- Taylor Locke
- They Might Be Giants
- The Posies
- The Wellingtons
- Tracy Bonham
- Tsar
- Young Hines
