= Furr =

Album by Blitzen Trapper

Studio album by Blitzen Trapper
- Released: September 23, 2008
- Genre: Alternative country
- Length: 39:05
- Label: Sub Pop

Blitzen Trapper chronology
Wild Mountain Nation (2007)	Furr (2008)	Black River Killer (2009)

Furr, released in 2008, is the fourth album by Blitzen Trapper. The album was listed at #13 on Rolling Stone's 50 Best Albums of 2008, and the title track made #4 on Rolling Stone's 100 Best Singles of 2008. Music videos were made for the album's two singles, "Furr" and "Black River Killer".

Robin Pecknold of the band Fleet Foxes responded to the track "Lady On the Water" enthusiastically: "it's a beautiful and woozy folk song. Eric Earley is a supergenius and it's so wonderful to hear folk music that's not just 'folk' because of the quaint acoustic instruments as is sometimes the case these days. I think a proper folk song needs to be instructive and entertaining, in the sense that the melody has its own captivating logic, I think a good folk song is like a machine, all elements perfectly calibrated, and this song is the Large Hadron Collider, smashing things together to get to the bottom of the universe."

On September 14, 2018, Sub Pop released a 10th Anniversary Deluxe Edition of Furr with an extra disc of bonus tracks recorded around the time of the 2008 Furr sessions and tour. Two were live radio recordings of songs from the original Furr album. Three tracks, “War and Placebo,” “Booksmart Baby” and “Maybe Baby,” came from previous Record Store Day singles. Seven others had never been publicly released. This extended edition's booklet included an interview with Eric Earley conducted by actor Rainn Wilson.

== Track listing ==
All songs written by Eric Earley

No.	Title	Length
1.	"Sleepytime in the Western World"	3:30
2.	"Gold for Bread"	2:47
3.	"Furr"	4:08
4.	"God & Suicide"	2:21
5.	"Fire & Fast Bullets"	2:51
6.	"Saturday Nite"	2:08
7.	"Black River Killer"	3:28
8.	"Not Your Lover"	2:51
9.	"Love U"	3:02
10.	"War on Machines"	3:20
11.	"Stolen Shoes & A Rifle"	2:46
12.	"Echo/Always On/EZ Con"	3:28
13.	"Lady on the Water"	2:27

10th Anniversary Deluxe Edition - Disc 2
No.	Title	Length
14.	"War is Placebo"	2:18
15.	"Simple Tree"	2:28
16.	"Booksmart Baby"	1:58
17.	"Heroes of Doubt"	3:14
18.	"Maybe Baby"	1:55
19.	"Ballad of Bird Love"	3:31
20.	"Hard Heart"	2:33
21.	"Other People’s Money"	3:36
22.	"On My Way to the Bay"	3:13
23.	"Rent-a-Cop"	2:07
24.	"God & Suicide (Live at KCRW)"	2:57
25.	"Furr (Live at KCRW)"	4:22

== Critical reception ==
Professional ratings
Aggregate scores
Source	Rating
Metacritic	80/100
Review scores
Source	Rating
AllMusic	4/5 stars
Crawdaddy!	(Favorable)
Paste Magazine	(83/100)
Pitchfork	(8.5/10)
Rolling Stone	4/5 stars

Critical response to the album was overwhelmingly favorable. Rolling Stone gave Furr four out of five stars and called it "an engaging album full of rootsy beauty." Billboard found it to be "a perfect fall soundtrack rife with woodsy imagery." Entertainment Weekly, in an article recommending what to exchange unwanted Christmas gifts for, said the album was "part harmony-laden tambourine jangle, part British Invasion guitar charm, and fully worth braving brutal return lines at the mall."
