= List of musicians from Chicago =

Flag of Chicago

The following list includes notable musicians who were born or have lived in Chicago, Illinois.

== A ==
Name	Image	Birth	Death	Known for	Association	Reference
Emma Abbott		Dec 9, 1850	Jan 5, 1891	Operatic soprano and impresario	Born in Chicago	
Lil Hardin Armstrong		Feb 3, 1898	Aug 27, 1971	Pianist and bandleader	Lived and performed in Bronzeville, Chicago neighborhood	
Emilie Autumn		Sep 22, 1979		Violindustrial singer, violinist, poet, and author		

== B ==
Name	Image	Birth	Death	Known for	Association	Reference
Patricia Barber		Nov 8, 1955		Jazz singer, songwriter, and pianist	Born in Chicago	
William Beckett		Feb 11, 1985		Musician, associated with The Academy Is...	Lived in Chicago	
Joe Becker (musician)		Jun 23, 1976		Guitarist, composer, and multi-instrumentalist	Born in Chicago	
Taylor Bennett		Jan 19, 1996		Rapper	Born in Chicago	
Franz Benteler		Jun 1, 1925	March 12, 2010	Violinist, "Ambassador of Music for Chicago"	Lived in Chicago	
Andrew Bird		Jul 11, 1973		Singer, songwriter, and multi-instrumentalist	Born in Chicago	
Zach Blair		Dec 26, 1974		Guitarist for Rise Against		
Danny Boy		Oct 31, 1977		Singer	Born in Chicago	
Harold Bradley Jr.		Oct 13, 1929	Apr 13, 2021	Singer of spirituals and blues, painter, actor, TV host, former football player, founder of Italy's iconic Folkstudio music club	Born in Chicago	
Oscar Brown Jr.		Oct 10, 1926	May 29, 2005	Musician, poet	Born in Chicago	
Bob Bryar		December 31, 1979	November 24, 2024		Drummer of My Chemical Romance	Born in Chicago
Johnny Burke		Oct 3, 1908	Feb 25, 1964	Lyricist	Raised in Chicago	
Paul Butterfield		Dec 17, 1942	May 4, 1987	Blues musician	Born in Chicago	

== C ==
Name	Image	Birth	Death	Known for	Association	Reference
Jonathan Cain		Feb 26, 1950		Singer and keyboardist of the rock band Journey	Born in Chicago	
Marty Casey		Sep 26, 1973		Frontman of the rock band Lovehammers	Born in Chicago	
Peter Cetera		Sep 13, 1944		Former singer and bassist of Chicago	Born in Chicago	
Jimmy Chamberlin		Jun 10, 1964		Drummer for The Smashing Pumpkins		
Chance the Rapper (born Chancelor Bennett)		Apr 16, 1993		Rapper	Born in Chicago	
Gene Chandler		Jul 6, 1937		Singer	Born in Chicago	
Chief Keef (born Keith Cozart)		Aug 15, 1995		Rapper	Born and lived in the Washington Park and Englewood neighborhoods on the South Side of Chicago	
Charles W. Clark		Oct 15, 1865	Aug 4, 1925	Operatic baritone and vocalist teacher	Lived in Chicago	
Nat King Cole		Mar 17, 1919	Feb 15, 1965	Singer	Lived in the Bronzeville neighborhood of Chicago	
Steve Cole		Aug 17, 1971		Jazz saxophonist	Born in Chicago	
Steve Coleman		Sep 20, 1956		Saxophonist	Born in Chicago	
Sam Cooke		Jan 22, 1931	Dec 11, 1964	Singer		
Billy Corgan		Mar 17, 1967		Singer and guitarist for The Smashing Pumpkins	Lived in Chicago	
James Cotton		Jul 1, 1935	Mar 16, 2017	Blues musician		
Lil JoJo (Born Joseph J. Coleman)		Apr 6, 1994	Sep 4, 2012	Drill rapper	Born in Chicago	
Cupcakke (born Elizabeth Harris)		May 31, 1997		Rapper	Born and lived in Chicago	

== D ==
Name	Image	Birth	Death	Known for	Association	Reference
Jack DeJohnette		Aug 9, 1942	Oct 26, 2025	Drummer and pianist	Born in Chicago	
Famous Dex		Sep 6, 1993		Rapper	Lived in Chicago	
Dennis DeYoung		Feb 18, 1947		Singer and keyboardist of Styx		
Bo Diddley (born Ellas Otha Bates)		Dec 30, 1928	Jun 2, 2008	Rock and roll guitarist, singer, and songwriter	Lived in Chicago	
Willie Dixon		Jul 1, 1915	Jan 29, 1992	Blues songwriter and record producer		
Bill Doerrfeld		April 3, 1964		Classical and jazz pianist	Born in Chicago	
Young Dolph		Jul 27, 1985	Nov 17, 2021	Rapper	Born in Chicago	
Florence Kirsch Du Brul		1915	Jul 2, 2005	Classical pianist		
Lil Durk		Oct 19, 1992		Rapper	Born in the Englewood neighborhood of Chicago	

- David Draiman (born 1973), lead singer for the band Disturbed

== E ==
	Image	Birth	Death	Known for	Association	Reference
Kurt Elling		Nov 2, 1967		Singer	Born and began his career in Chicago	
Phil Everly		Jan 19, 1939	Jan 3, 2014	Singer	Born in Chicago	

== F ==
Name	Image	Birth	Death	Known for	Association	Reference
Ethan Farmer		May 31, 1975		bassist	Born in Chicago	
Jeremih Felton (a.k.a. Jeremih)		Jul 17, 1987		Singer	Born in Chicago	
Paul Filipowicz		Mar 24, 1950		Chicago blues musician	Born in Chicago	
Drew Fortier		Jul 14, 1987		Guitarist for Bang Tango, Chuck Mosley, Stephen Shareaux, and Zen From Mars	Born and raised in Chicago	
Bud Freeman		Apr 13, 1906	Mar 15, 1991	Jazz saxophonist, bandleader and composer	Born, worked and died in Chicago	
George Freeman (guitarist)		Apr 10, 1927	Apr 1, 2025	Jazz guitarist	Born in Chicago	
Von Freeman		Oct 3, 1923	Aug 11, 2012	Jazz saxophonist	Born, worked and died in Chicago	
Alexander Frey		Oct 5, 1972		Conductor, pianist, organist, harpsichordist and composer	Born and grew up in Chicago	
Kinky Friedman (born Richard S. Friedman)		Nov 1, 1944	Jun 27, 2024	Singer, songwriter, novelist, humorist, politician and former columnist	Born in Chicago	

== G ==
Name	Image	Birth	Death	Known for	Association	Reference
Polo G		Jan 6, 1999		Rapper	Born in the Old Town district of Chicago	
Marla Glen		Jan 3, 1960		Singer	Born and grown up in Chicago	
Benny Goodman		May 30, 1909	Jun 13, 1986	Bandleader	Born in Chicago	
Steve Goodman		Jul 25, 1948	Sep 20, 1984	Singer	Born in Chicago	
Gene Greene		Jun 9, 1857	Apr 5, 1930	Singer		
Buddy Guy		Jul 30, 1936		Blues guitarist		
Rashawnna Guy (a.k.a. Shawnna)		Jan 3, 1978		Rapper	Born in Chicago	

== H ==
Name	Image	Birth	Death	Known for	Association	Reference
Jim Hager		Aug 30, 1941	May 1, 2008	Singer	Born in Chicago	
Jon Hager		Aug 30, 1941	Jan 9, 2009	Singer	Born in Chicago	
Terry Hanck		Dec 29, 1944		Blues saxophonist and singer	Born in Chicago	
Herbie Hancock		Apr 12, 1940		Jazz pianist, bandleader and composer	Born in Chicago	
Eddie Harris		Oct 20, 1934	Nov 5, 1996	Jazz saxophonist	Born in Chicago	
Elizabeth Eden Harris (a.k.a. CupcakKe)		May 31, 1997		Rapper	Born in Chicago	
Shawntae Harris (a.k.a. Da Brat)		Apr 14, 1974		Rapper	Born in Chicago	
Jarad Anthony Higgins (a.k.a. Juice Wrld)		Dec 2, 1998	Dec 8, 2019	Rapper, Singer	Born in Chicago	
Art Hodes		Nov 14, 1904	Mar 4, 1993	Jazz pianist	Raised in Chicago, worked there for many years	
Loleatta Holloway		Nov 5, 1946	Mar 21, 2011	Singer	Born in Chicago	
Miki Howard		Sep 30, 1960		Singer	Born in Chicago	
Howlin' Wolf (born Chester Arthur Burnett)		Jun 10, 1910	Jan 10, 1976	Musician		
Jennifer Hudson		Sep 12, 1981		Singer, actress, spokesperson, American Idol finalist	Born in Chicago	
Andy Hurley		May 31, 1980		Drummer for Fall Out Boy		

== I ==
Name	Image	Birth	Death	Known for	Association	Reference
James Iha		Mar 26, 1968		Guitarist for The Smashing Pumpkins	Born in Chicago	
Daniel Ivankovich		Nov 23, 1963		Blues guitarist and vocalist	Raised and lives in Chicago	

== J ==
Name	Image	Birth	Death	Known for	Association	Reference
Wasalu Muhammad Jaco (a.k.a. Lupe Fiasco)		Feb 17, 1982		Rapper	Born in Chicago	
Ramone Johnson (a.k.a. Cashis)		Oct 10, 1982		Rapper	Born in Chicago	
Syleena Johnson		Sep 2, 1976		Singer		
Donell Jones		May 22, 1973		Singer and composer	Born in Chicago	
Quincy Jones		Mar 14, 1933	Nov 3, 2024	Record producer	Born in Chicago	
Benn Jordan		Oct 28, 1978		Electronic musician		

== K ==
Name	Image	Birth	Death	Known for	Association	Reference
Lucy Kaplansky		Feb 16, 1960		Folk singer	Born in Chicago	
Terry Kath		Jan 31, 1946	Jan 23, 1978	Singer and guitarist of Chicago	Born in Chicago	
Brendan Kelly		Sep 8, 1976		Bassist and vocalist of punk band The Lawrence Arms		
R. Kelly		Jan 8, 1967		R&B singer-songwriter, record producer and convicted sex offender	Born in the Hyde Park neighborhood of Chicago, lived in Douglas' Bronzeville area	
Chaka Khan		Mar 23, 1953		Singer ("Tell Me Something Good", "Sweet Thing" which she wrote for her then husband Richard Holland, "Ain't Nobody", "I'm Every Woman", "I Feel for You" and "Through the Fire")	Born in the Hyde Park neighborhood of Chicago	
William Wallace Kimball		1828	1904	Founder of Kimball Piano Company		
Mike Kinsella		Mar 4, 1977		Singer and guitarist for American Football. Singer/songwriter under the stage name Owen.	Born in Chicago	
Irwin Kostal		Oct 1, 1911	Nov 23, 1994	Arranger, composer, conductor	Born in Chicago	
Gene Krupa		Jan 15, 1909	Oct 16, 1973	Drummer and bandleader	Born in Chicago	

== L ==
Name	Image	Birth	Death	Known for	Association	Reference
Robert Lamm		Oct 13, 1944		Singer and keyboardist of Chicago	Grew up in Chicago	
Ramsey Lewis		May 27, 1935	Sep 12, 2022	Jazz pianist and composer	Born in Chicago	
Timothy Michael Linton (a.k.a. Zim Zum)		Jun 25, 1969		Guitarist and songwriter for Marilyn Manson, The Pop Culture Suicides	Born in Chicago	
Nils Lofgren		Jun 21, 1951		Member of Bruce Springsteen's E Street Band, former backing musician for Neil Young	Born in Chicago	
Radoslav Lorković		Sep 3, 1958		Croatian American Musician	Lives in Chicago	
Lucki		May 30, 1996		Rapper	Born in Chicago	
Lonnie Rashid Lynn, Jr. (a.k.a. Common)		Mar 13, 1972		Rapper	Born in Chicago	
Lil Durk		Oct 19, 1992		Rapper Singer	Born In Chicago	

== M ==
Name	Image	Birth	Death	Known for	Association	Reference
Ray Manzarek		Feb 12, 1939	May 20, 2013	Keyboardist of The Doors	Born in Chicago	
Richard Marx		Sep 16, 1963		Singer and songwriter	Born in Chicago	
Curtis Mayfield		Jun 3, 1942	Dec 26, 1999	Songwriter and guitarist	Born in Chicago	
Vic Mensa		June 6, 1993		Rapper and activist	Born in Chicago	
Tim McIlrath		Nov 3, 1978		Lead singer and guitarist for Rise Against		
Carl Terrell Mitchell (a.k.a. Twista)		Nov 27, 1973		Rapper	Born in Chicago	
Tom Morello		May 30, 1964		Guitarist		
McKinley Morganfield (a.k.a. Muddy Waters)		Apr 4, 1913	Apr 30, 1983	Blues musician	Lived in Chicago	

== N ==
Name	Image	Birth	Death	Known for	Association	Reference
Wayne Nelson		Jun 1, 1950		Lead singer of Little River Band		
Anastacia Lyn Newkirk (a.k.a. Anastacia)		Sep 17, 1968		Singer	Born in Chicago	
Francis Warren Nicholls, Jr. (a.k.a. Frankie Knuckles)	Frankie Knuckles	Jan 18, 1955	Mar 31, 2014	House music pioneer, called the "Godfather of House"	Lived in Chicago, developed Chicago house genre	

== O ==
Name	Image	Birth	Death	Known for	Association	Reference
Jim O'Rourke		Jan 18, 1969		Experimental musician	Born in Chicago	

== P ==
Name	Image	Birth	Death	Known for	Association	Reference
Keke Palmer		Aug 26, 1993		Singer actress		
Chuck Panozzo		Sep 20, 1948		Bass guitarist for Styx	Born in Chicago	
John Panozzo		Sep 20, 1948	Jul 16, 1996	Drummer for Styx	Grew up in the Roseland neighborhood of Chicago	
Walter Parazaider		Mar 14, 1945		Woodwind player for Chicago	Born in Chicago	
Sol Patches				Rapper and poet	Born and resides in Chicago	
Tom Paxton		Oct 31, 1937		Folk singer, songwriter	Born in Chicago	
Jim Peterik	Jim Peterik	Nov 11, 1950		Founding member of Survivor and member of The Ides of March	Born and raised in the Chicago suburb of Berwyn	
Liz Phair		Apr 17, 1967		Singer		
Rachel Barton Pine		Oct 11, 1974		Violinist	Born in Chicago	
Omar Jeffery Pineiro		May 15, 1997		Rapper, known professionally as Smokepurpp	Born in Chicago	
Joe Principe		Nov 14, 1974		Bassist for Rise Against	Born in Chicago	
John Prine		Oct 10, 1946	Apr 7, 2020	Folk singer, songwriter	Born in Chicago	
Vicky Psarakis		Jun 22, 1988		Vocalist for The Agonist	Born in Chicago	

== R ==
Name	Image	Birth	Death	Known for	Association	Reference
"Kal" David Raskin	Kal David	Jun 15, 1943	Aug 16, 2022	Guitarist, singer, songwriter, Illinois Speed Press	Born in Chicago	
Elizabeth Reiter				Operatic soprano	Born in Chicago	
Ryan Raddon (a.k.a. Kaskade)		Feb 25, 1971		Electronic musician	Born in Chicago	
Mishon Ratliff		Feb 3, 1993		Singer and actor		
Lou Rawls		Dec 1, 1933	Jan 6, 2006	Singer	Born in Chicago	
Lil Reese		Jan 6, 1993		Rapper	Born in Chicago	
Minnie Riperton		Nov 8, 1947	Jul 12, 1979	Singer	Born in Chicago	

== S ==
Name	Image	Birth	Death	Known for	Association	Reference
Fredo Santana		Jul 4, 1990	Jan 19, 2018	Rapper	Born in Chicago	
Danny Seraphine		Aug 28, 1948		Drummer of the band Chicago	Born in Chicago	
Peniel D. Shin		Mar 10, 1993		Rapper and vocalist for BtoB		
Silver Sphere		Aug 26, 1999		Singer-songwriter	Born and raised in Chicago	
Matt Skiba		Feb 24, 1976		Lead singer and guitarist of Alkaline Trio and blink-182	Born in Chicago	
Che Smith (a.k.a. Rhymefest)		Jul 6, 1977		Rapper	Born in Chicago	
Patti Smith		Dec 30, 1946		Singer, songwriter and poet	Born in Chicago	
Horatio Spafford		Oct 20, 1828	Oct 16, 1888	Composer		
Donita Sparks		Apr 8, 1962		Lead singer, rhythm guitarist and founder of bands L7 and Donita Sparks and the Stellar Moments; one of the founders of the pro-choice organisation Rock for Choice and of CASH Music	Born in Chicago	
Mavis Staples		Jul 10, 1939		Singer	Born in Chicago	
Larry Steele		1913	June 19, 1980	Songwriter, composer, and impresario	Raised in Chicago	
Patrick Stump		Apr 27, 1984		Lead singer and guitarist for Fall Out Boy	Born in the Chicago suburb of Evanston	
Todd Sucherman		May 2, 1969		Drummer for the band Styx	Born in Chicago	
Johnny		Feb 2, 1995		Musician and member of NCT	Born in Chicago	
William Susman		Aug 29, 1960		Composer		
Earl Sweatshirt		Feb 24, 1994		Rapper, producer, and songwriter	Born and raised in Chicago	
Smokepurpp		May 15, 1997		Rapper, Singer, Songwriter	Born In Chicago and raised Miami	

== T ==
Name	Image	Birth	Death	Known for	Association	Reference
Eddie Taylor Jr.		Mar 27, 1972	Mar 8, 2019	Chicago blues and electric blues guitarist, singer and songwriter	Born in Chicago	
Koko Taylor		Sep 28, 1928	Jun 3, 2009	Singer	Lived and died in Chicago	
Theodore Roosevelt Taylor (a.k.a. Hound Dog Taylor)		Apr 12, 1915	Dec 17, 1975	Guitarist		
Kim Thayil		Sep 4, 1960		Guitarist of Soundgarden		
Doug Timm		Jun 14, 1960	Jul 21, 1989	Composer and songwriter	Born in Chicago	
Giorgio Tozzi		Jan 8, 1923	May 30, 2011	Basso	Born in Chicago	
Lennie Tristano		Mar 19, 1919	Nov 18, 1978	Pianist	Born in Chicago	
Joe Trohman		Sep 1, 1984		Guitarist for Fall Out Boy		
Jeff Tweedy		Aug 25, 1967		Singer and songwriter, member of Wilco and Uncle Tupelo		
Twista		Nov 27, 1973		Rapper	Born In Chicago	

== V ==
Name	Image	Birth	Death	Known for	Association	Reference
Eddie Vedder		Dec 23, 1964		Lead singer for the band Pearl Jam		
King Von		Aug 9, 1994	Nov 6, 2020	Rapper	Born in Chicago	

== W ==
Name	Image	Birth	Death	Known for	Association	Reference
Jonathan Jacob Walker		Sep 17, 1985		Bassist for Panic at the Disco		
Christian Ward (a.k.a. Yung Berg)		Sep 9, 1986		Rapper	Born in Chicago	
Dinah Washington		Aug 29, 1924	Dec 14, 1963	Singer		
Jody Watley		Jan 30, 1959		Singer	Born in Chicago	
DeAndre Cortez Way (a.k.a. Soulja Boy)		Jul 28, 1990		Rapper	Born in Chicago	
Pete Wentz		Jun 5, 1979		Bassist and lyricist for Fall Out Boy		
Paul Wertico		Jan 5, 1953		Jazz drummer	Born in Chicago	
Kanye West		Jun 8, 1977		Rapper and producer	Grew up in the South Shore neighborhood of Chicago	
Verdine White		Jul 25, 1951		Bassist and Founding member for Earth Wind & Fire	Born in Chicago	
Pharez Whitted		Aug 26, 1960		Jazz trumpeter, composer, educator		
Wesley Willis		May 31, 1963	Aug 21, 2003	Singer	born in Chicago	
Dion Wilson (a.k.a. No ID)		Jun 23, 1971		Hip hop and R&B record producer	Born in Chicago	
D'arcy Wretzky		May 1, 1968		Bassist for Smashing Pumpkins		
Herbert Wright (a.k.a. G Herbo)		Oct 8, 1995		Rapper	Born in Chicago	

== Y ==
Name	Image	Birth	Death	Known for	Association	Reference
Camille Yarbrough		Jan 8, 1938		Singer, author, actress	Born in Chicago	
James Young		Nov 14, 1949		Guitarist for Styx	Born in Chicago	
Yomo		Jun 17, 1980		Regueton Singer	Born in Chicago	

== Z ==
Name	Image	Birth	Death	Known for	Association	Reference
Warren Zevon		Jan 24, 1947	Sep 7, 2003	Singer	Born in Chicago	

== Bands ==
Name	Image	Founded	Disbanded	Music	Association	Reference
88 Fingers Louie		1993	2011	Punk band	Founded in Chicago	
Alacranes Musical		1999		Duranguense	Founded in the Chicago suburb of Aurora	
Beach Bunny		2015		Rock band	Founded in Chicago	
Big Black		1981	1987	Punk/noise rock band	Founded in Chicago suburb of Evanston	
The Buckinghams		1966	present	Sunshine pop band	Founded in Chicago	
Cheap Trick		1973	present	Rock group	Founded in Chicago, Cheap Trick plans to open a music complex on Motor Row in Chicago's South Loop	
The Chi-Lites		1959	present	R&B soul vocal quartet	Founded in Chicago	
Chicago		1967	present	Rock band	Founded in Chicago	
Cobalt & the Hired Guns		2003		Punk rock band	Based in Chicago	
Disturbed		1994	present	Heavy metal band	Founded in Chicago	
Do or Die (a.k.a. D.O.D.)		1995	present	Rap trio	Originally from the west side of Chicago	
Earth, Wind & Fire		1971	present	Band spanning various genres such as soul, R&B, pop, jazz, funk, disco, rock, Latin and African	Founded in Chicago	
The Emotions		1962	present	Soul/R&B vocal group	Founded in Chicago	
Enuff Z'Nuff		1984		Rock band	Founded in Chicago	
Fall Out Boy		2001	present	Rock band	Founded in the Chicago suburb of Wilmette	
Hope in Ghosts		2001		Rock band	From Chicago	
The Jesus Lizard		1987	present	Alternative/noise rock band	Moved to Chicago in 1989, originally from Austin, Texas	
Kids These Days		2009	2013	Hip hop band	Founded in Chicago	
Kill Hannah		1993	2015	Rock band	Founded in Chicago	
Krewella		2007	present	Electronic trio	Founded in Chicago	
Lakeside Singers				Ensemblé	From Chicago area	
Louis the Child		2013	present	Electronic duo	Founded in Chicago	
Ministry		1981	present	Pioneering industrial metal band	Founded in Chicago	
Naked Raygun		1980	present	Punk rock band	Founded in Chicago	
OK Go		1998	present	Rock band	Founded in Chicago	
Paul Butterfield Blues Band		1963	1971	Blues rock band, performed at Woodstock	Founded in Chicago by Paul Butterfield and Mike Bloomfield	
Plain White T's		1997	present	Pop punk band	Founded in the Chicago suburb of Lombard	
Rise Against		1999	present	Punk-rock group	Founded in Chicago	
Rufus		1970	1983	Funk and R&B band	Founded in Chicago	
Screeching Weasel		1986	present	pioneering pop punk band	Founded in the Chicago suburb of Prospect Heights	
Slow Motion Crash		2006		Rock band	From Chicago	
The Smashing Pumpkins		1988	present	Rock band	Founded in Chicago	
Smith Westerns		2007	present	Garage/indie rock band	Founded in Chicago	
The Staple Singers		1948	1994	R&B singing group	Founded in Chicago	
TRS-80		1997	present	Electronic	Founded in Chicago	
Twin Peaks		2012	present	Rock band	Founded in Chicago	
Urge Overkill		1986	present	Rock band	Founded in Chicago	
The White Tie Affair		2006	2012	Pop-rock band	Founded in Chicago	
Whitney		2015	present	Indie folk/indie rock/soul band	Founded in Chicago	
Wilco		1994	present	Alternative rock band	Founded in Chicago	
