= Hope in Ghosts =

- Origin: Chicago, Illinois
- Genres: Rock, Indie rock, Alternative rock
- Years active: 2001-present
- Label: Actually, Records
- Members: Ted Flynn
- Website: Official site

Hope in Ghosts is the post-rock or indie rock project of Ted Flynn. Early reviews of the first release, e.p., garnered immediate comparisons with Slint and Seam, while the 2007 release of All your Departures placed Flynn on the same label, Chicago's Actually, Records, as the band ee, which includes Seam front man Sooyoung Park.

The music of Hope in Ghosts is characterized mostly by slow-building, layered and melancholy guitar work that generally builds to anthemic proportions.

== Discography ==
=== Albums ===
- 2007 - All your Departures

=== EPs and singles ===
- 2001 - e.p.
