= Reunion (Korea Girl song) =

Song by Korea Girl

from the album Korea Girl
- Released: 1997
- Recorded: 1996
- Studio: Practice Place
- Genre: Indie rock; Jangle pop
- Length: 4:19
- Label: Asian Man Records
- Songwriter: Elizabeth Yi

"Reunion" is a song by American indie rock band Korea Girl, written in 1996 and released in 1997 on the band's self-titled debut album through Asian Man Records. Metro Silicon Valley described it as the band's "de facto single." The song received little attention upon release, though, it went viral on TikTok and YouTube roughly three decades later, growing from a few thousand streams on Spotify to more than 36 million.

== Background and composition ==
"Reunion" was written by vocalist and guitarist Elizabeth Yi, based on her own experience of receiving an invitation to her ten-year high school reunion from Edmonds-Woodway High School in Edmonds Washington. Rather than attend, Yi said she felt resolved to leave the memories behind, a sentiment that became the basis for the song's refrain: "Why would I spend more time / With people that I hate / Couldn't wait to leave behind." Yi has said the songwriting process was fluid once she began, drawing on frustration at the invitation itself. Metro Silicon Valley described the song as jangly and mid-tempo, characterizing it as "her scathing reaction to an invitation to her high school reunion" and calling it representative of a broader honesty in Yi's songwriting.

The song's lyrics were also rooted in Yi's experience growing up as a Korean American in Washington state, where she recalled being targeted with racial epithets by passing motorists on her way to and from school. Musically, the San Francisco Chronicle described the song's jangly guitar sound as recalling bands such as Mazzy Star and Pavement, while comparing Yi's vocal delivery to Hope Sandoval or Beabadoobee. Guitarist Tobin Mori has said he modeled the band's lo-fi recording approach on Pavement's Slanted and Enchanted, an influence he also cited in a separate interview with Strand Magazine alongside Slowdive and Mojave 3, as setting Korea Girl apart from the heavier guitar music that dominated the San Jose scene at the time.

According to Metro Silicon Valley, the album was recorded at the Practice Place in San Jose, with vocals tracked separately in a small basement space beneath Mori's rented house, using an eight-track Tascam DA-38 recorder that captured digital audio onto Hi-8 video cassettes. The outlet reported that the band had earlier self-recorded a four-song demo in March 1996 using a Tascam four-track, which they distributed to local journalists, radio stations, and promoters, including Metro music journalist Todd Inoue, who brought the band to the attention of Asian Man Records founder Mike Park.

The song appeared on Korea Girl's self-titled debut album, released in 1997, as well as on Asian Man Records' "Mailorder Is Fun" compilation. The album, which also featured songs addressing themes such as depression ("Prozac"), a crisis of faith ("Under the Sun"), and the discomfort of small talk ("Conversations"), was named Album of the Year by Santa Clara University's college radio station, KSCU.

== Viral resurgence ==
Beginning around 2025, "Reunion" began circulating widely on TikTok and YouTube, prompting a surge of fan-made content including covers, guitar tutorials, reaction videos, and edits set to the song, without being tied to any single viral trend format. Yi, who had left the music industry after Korea Girl disbanded in 1999, first learned of the song's renewed popularity from her niece, Jamie Yi, a college student who discovered that a friend was already familiar with the song without knowing of her aunt's connection to it.

Yi has said she was moved by comments from listeners describing the song's impact, including one describing how it helped them through a difficult period in high school. According to the Chronicle, "Reunion" joined a broader trend of older songs finding new audiences online, citing examples such as Connie Francis's 1962 single "Pretty Little Baby" and a viral mashup of 4 Non Blondes' 1993 song "What's Up?" with Nicki Minaj's "Beez in the Trap".

The song's resurgence also created complications for the band's back catalog. As streams rose, a hacker created a fraudulent Korea Girl profile on Spotify, redirecting royalties away from the group. Mori said it took months of effort, along with assistance from Asian Man Records founder Mike Park, to resolve the issue, during which Korea Girl's catalog was temporarily removed from streaming services while the band worked to reclaim its digital distribution rights.

In the wake of the song's renewed popularity, Mori remastered Korea Girl's original album and 1996 demo recordings, and located additional archival material, including a previously unreleased cover of Rick Springfield's "Jessie's Girl" and an alternate demo version of "Reunion," to which Yi recorded new vocals during a 2025 recording session.

Metro Silicon Valley separately reported that Korea Girl's back catalog attracted renewed label interest even before the song's viral spread. In 2023, the Los Angeles cassette label 7th Heaven Recordings, founded by Brock Pierce, reissued the band's self-titled debut album, with the full pressing selling out within an hour and a half. Mori donated the proceeds to the World Central Kitchen after being unable to reach some of his former bandmates to arrange payment. In 2024, Asian Man Records issued its own vinyl repress of the album, which also sold out within weeks.

== Personnel ==
Attributed by several sources.

- Elizabeth Yi – vocals, guitar, songwriting
- Tobin Mori – guitar
- Mark Duarte – drums
- Summer Farnese – bass
