= Headsparks =

Studio album by Seam
- Released: 1992
- Recorded: August 1991
- Studio: Duck-Kee (Raleigh, North Carolina)
- Genre: Indie rock
- Length: 33:21
- Label: Homestead
- Producer: Jerry Kee

Seam chronology
Headsparks (1992)	Kernel (1993)

Headsparks is the debut studio album by the American indie rock band Seam, released in 1992 by Homestead Records.

== Composition and music ==
Music journalist Andrew Earles characterized the album's tracks as "fuzzed-out downer anthems," calling them "a sort of advanced version of the melodic attention-getters that countered the less friendly, aggressive material on Bitch Magnet albums." According to Ned Raggett of AllMusic, "There's hints of Pixies, the Louisville underground, the incipient Merge scene, and even a touch of Neil Young's storming melancholia, resulting in a blend that's at once powerful, heartfelt, and anthemic almost in spite of itself." He described the album's opening track "Decatur" as "emotional" but "not 'emo' in any sense of the word." The album's style has drawn comparisons to David Gedge and the Wedding Present. Raggett described the singing performance of Sooyoung Park on the album as "vary[ing] between the murky and somewhat more straightforward," and characterized his application of his vocals as a "cryptic instrument, often sounding a little lost in the kick of the music."

== Recording and release ==
Headsparks was recorded by Jerry Kee at Duck-Kee Studios in Raleigh, North Carolina, in August 1991. The album was released in 1992 by Homestead Records.

== Critical reception ==
Headsparks was positively received by critics. Ned Raggett of AllMusic praised Sooyoung Park's singing and guitar playing, saying that the record features "a blend that's at once powerful, heartfelt, and anthemic almost in spite of itself." He considered "Sky City" and "Feather" to be the album's highlights. Victoria Wheeler of Spin also enjoyed the album, commenting that Seam "gets slow but not lethargic, sensitive but not whiny, persistent but not nagging, confused but far from lost. Plus, the band pulls clever punches like pasting all that static-y haze over smartly tart, twangy, almost banjoish guitar."

== Track listing ==
All tracks are written by Seam unless otherwise noted.

No.	Title	Writer(s)	Length
1.	"Decatur"		3:20
2.	"Grain"		2:48
3.	"Sky City"		2:35
4.	"Pins & Needles"		3:22
5.	"Feather"		5:28
6.	"Atari"		3:09
7.	"King Rice"		3:05
8.	"New Year's"	Lexi Mitchell, Sooyoung Park	3:02
9.	"Shame"	Mark Saltzman	1:42
10.	"Granny 9x"		4:50

== Personnel ==
Credits are adapted from the album's liner notes.

Seam

- Mac McCaughan – drums
- Lexi Mitchell – bass
- Sooyoung Park – vocals, guitar

Technical and additional personnel

- Jerry Kee – engineering
- Sarah Shannon – vocals on "Shame"
- Jennifer Walker – vocals on "New Year's"
