= Ee (band) =

American indie rock band

Ee (sometimes stylized as ee, EE, or eE) is an American, San Francisco-based indie rock band, that formed in 1999 by former Korea Girl guitarist/vocalist Tobin Mori and bassist Jay Chow/Che Chou. Earlier band members included Brian Gathy, Peter Newman, Susan Parker, and Thom Morrison, and were later replaced by Peter Nguyen on drums, and longtime Seam member Sooyoung Park on lead guitar and keyboard. All members of Ee are Asian-American.

In an email, guitarist/vocalist Tobin Mori said, "The name Ee was the first drummer's suggestion. It has no established meaning—he derived the name by typing all the keys on his keyboard twice, because he liked short names."

They recorded their debut album, Ramadan, in the fall of 1999 and released it on Currycore Records. After some lineup changes Ee released an EP and a second album, For 100 We Try Harder, on Asian Man Records in 2002. Additionally, Ee released another album, Capital Plans in 2006 under a new record label, Actually, Records. In 2022, the band's album Ramadan received a re-release via Los Angeles based record label 7th Heaven.

In November 2025, Ee played their first shows in nearly 20 years at The Fillmore in San Francisco, California and Echoplex in Los Angeles, California.

== Discography ==
- Ramadan (2000, Curry Records)
- Tinyspot EP (2002, Asian Man Records)
- For 100 We Try Harder (2002, Asian Man Records)
- Capital Plans (2006, Actually, Records)
- For 100 We Try Harder (Deluxe Album) (2023, 7th Heaven)
