= Edmonds Woodway High School =

Coordinates: 47°48′18″N 122°20′16″W

Edmonds-Woodway High School
- North Entrance of campus, accessible via 212th St SW

Location
- 7600 212th Street SW; Edmonds, Washington 98026; United States

Information
- Type: Public secondary school
- Motto: There are two kinds of people in this world: Warriors and those who wish they were!
- Established: 1990
- School district: Edmonds School District
- Principal: Dave Golden - interim
- Teaching staff: 66.10 (FTE)
- Grades: 9–12
- Enrollment: 1,578 (2023–2024)
- Student to teacher ratio: 23.87
- Campus size: 30 Acres
- Campus type: Suburban
- Colors: Purple, Green, Yellow & Orange
- Mascot: Warren the Warrior; Warriors
- Website: https://ewhs.edmonds.wednet.edu

Edmonds Woodway High School is one of five high schools in the Edmonds School District in Edmonds, Washington, United States. It serves students in grades 9–12. It was ranked as the No. 318 high school in America by Newsweek Magazine in 2009. The US News and World Report from 2025 to 2026 ranked EWHS No. 66 of 432 in Washington and No. 3880 of 18000 nationally.

== History and facilities ==
The original Edmonds High School was built in 1909 and was the first high school built in South Snohomish County. The original building was a two-story brick classical revival building and was replaced in 1939 by the building that today houses the Edmonds Center for the Arts. All that remains of the original building is the entry way, which now stands in front of Cascadia Art Museum, near the Edmonds waterfront. In 1957, as the population continued to grow, Edmonds High School moved a mile east from downtown Edmonds, into its current location.

Edmonds-Woodway was formed when Edmonds High School and Woodway High School (now the campus of Edmonds Heights K-12), merged in 1990. The schools' colors (gold, purple, orange and green) were combined, although purple and green are the dominant colors used. The school used the old Woodway High School campus until construction on a new facility at 7600 212th St SW. Prior to the merger, the two schools were academic and athletic rivals, despite sharing feeder middle schools.

The new campus, which opened in 1998, is located close to Highway 99 and is accessible from Interstate-5 via 220th St SW. It is designed around a central courtyard with a separate theater building (A) and classrooms organized in small learning communities (B through F). It received several regional and national design awards, including the 1990 Masonry Institute of Washington's Masonry Excellence Award for the use of masonry throughout the project, as well as the national annual design award of the Council of Educational Facilities Planners International, the 1999 James D. MacConnell Award for outstanding new educational facilities. Bassetti Architects of Seattle was the architectural firm for the new building.

In June 2018, the building's clock tower was named after longtime administrator Geoff Bennett, who retired after being honored at the school's graduation ceremony.

Past principals include Dr. Terrance Mims (2015–2020), Miriam Mickelson (2012–2015), Michelle Trifunovic (2007–2012), and Alan Weiss (1995–2007). Rainer Houser was the first principal of Edmonds-Woodway, serving from 1990 to 1995.

== Academics ==
=== IB Program ===
In 1996, Edmonds-Woodway became an International Baccalaureate (IB) World School, offering the IB Diploma Programme. Edmonds-Woodway is the only high school in the Edmonds School District to offer the program.

=== National student recognition ===
In 2009, Edmonds-Woodway student Sally Chu was named as the school's first US Presidential Scholar. In 2005, the school had eight National Merit Scholar finalists, the most of any high school in the state.

In 2006 the Edmonds-Woodway Deaf Academic Bowl Team competed for the first time. It was the first team in the history of the Academic Bowl to win a Regional competition their first year.

== Culture ==
=== Deaf community ===
Edmonds-Woodway has the largest deaf and hard-of-hearing student population in the Edmonds School District, due to programs offered for deaf and hard-of-hearing students. The school offers an American Sign Language (ASL) program and an ASL Club

=== Lifeskills program ===
Edmonds-Woodway has a Lifeskills Program for students with "mild to moderate developmental disabilities." Lifeskills students often take part in the annual Washington State Special Olympics. During the 2011 Winter Games in Wenatchee, Edmonds-Woodway students brought home awards.

== Athletics ==
The school is the location of Edmonds School District Stadium, the home football field for all high schools in the Edmonds School District. EW's traditional rival is Meadowdale High School. However, they also are common rivals with Mountlake Terrace High School and Lynnwood High School.

=== Programs ===
Edmonds-Woodway High School features a multitude of athletic programs that compete in WESCO and as a part of WIAA. Programs include Warrior Football, Wrestling, Softball, Baseball, Tennis, Swim, Cheerleading, Golf, Volleyball, Basketball, and Soccer.

=== Hall of Fame ===
The Edmonds-Woodway High School Athletic Hall of Fame was created in 2015 to commend the achievements of athletes and teams from across Edmonds, Woodway, and Edmonds-Woodway High School history. Due to the COVID-19 pandemic, the Hall of Fame did not induct new members in 2020 or 2021. Commended teams since 2015 include:

- The 1949 Edmonds High School Football Team – won the first Northwest League Football Championship, going 9–0 on the season
- 1966 EHS Baseball Team
- 1969 EHS Boys Basketball Team
- The 1984 Woodway Girls Basketball Team – won a state title going 25–2, beating North Kitsap in the final 54-52
- Woodway High School 1979 3A State Baseball Champions – first and only baseball championship won by EHS, WHS, or EWHS with a 24–3 record
- 1975, 1981, 1982, 1983, 1986, 1987, 1990 EHS Boys Cross Country Team State Champions
- 1976, 1983, 1984, 1985, 1987 EHS Girls Cross Country Team State Champions
- 1985 WHS State Softball Champions
- 1988 WHS Boys Basketball Team
- 1989 EHS 200-yard Medley Relay State Champions
- 1997 EWHS Volleyball Team
- 2008 EWHS Tennis Doubles State Champions: William Guo and Ryan Cho
- 2014 EWHS Girls Soccer Team State Champions – won their first state championship in 2014 with a 2–1 victory over Southridge.

== Music programs ==
The Jazz Ensemble I participates in Starbucks' Hot Java Cool Jazz performance held at the historic Paramount Theater each March. They have attended the Portland Jazz Festival (Portland, Oregon), the Leavenworth Jazz Festival in 2024 with Whitworth University's Jazz Ensemble, and have also participated regularly in the Lionel Hampton Jazz Festival at the University of Idaho in Moscow, ID, where they won the Sweepstakes Award in 2018, and the 4A Combo Award in 2023. The Jazz and Band programs are led by Jake Bergevin as of the 2025–2026 school year.

Jazz Ensemble 1 participated in Jazz at Lincoln Center Orchestra's Essentially Ellington contest in New York 5 times in 2003, 2007, 2010, 2013, and 2017. The group has also performed at the Montreux Jazz Festival, North Sea Jazz Festival, and Disney World.

Edmonds-Woodway has three concert bands: Concert Band, Symphonic Band and Wind Symphony. Choirs include Bel-Canto and Mello-Aires. Orchestral groups include the Concert Orchestra, Symphonic Orchestra and the auditioned Philharmonic Orchestra. For select concerts, the Full Orchestra includes advanced wind and percussion players from the Wind Symphony group. IB Music was formally offered until 2024.

In 2019, Mello-Aires were awarded best Large Vocal Jazz Ensemble by the Downbeat Magazine Student Music Awards, and performed at the Jazz Education Network Conference in 2020 in New Orleans. This group consists of 12 – 18 singers. Under the direction of Charlotte Reese, the Mello-Aires won in the 4A Large Group Vocal Jazz category at the Lionel Hampton Jazz Festival in 2023.

=== Big Band Dance ===
Annually in the Spring, the Big Band Dance is held at the Edmonds Waterfront Center featuring EWHS' Jazz Ensemble 1, performing swing music. EWHS Jazz Ensemble 2, College Place Middle School's and Madrona Middle School's jazz band also performs. This was held March 21, 2025 and March 22, 2024, most recently.

== Notable alumni ==
- Tracie Adix-Zins, college softball coach and 2007 Big East Pitcher of the Year (EWHS)
- Guy Anderson, abstract expressionist painter (EHS)
- Karen Bryant, WNBA basketball executive; VP of the Seattle Storm and GM/CAO of the Los Angeles Sparks (WHS)
- Brett Davern, actor, played Jake Rosati in MTV sitcom Awkward; also in CSI: Miami, Cold Case and films
- Michael DeRosier, rock drummer, 2013 Rock and Roll Hall of Fame inductee, original drummer for rock group Heart (WHS)
- Anna Faris, actress, podcaster, and writer best known for roles in The House Bunny (2008), Overboard (2018), Just Friends (2005) and Lost in Translation (2003), and star of the Scary Movie series
- Kevin Forrest, MLS soccer player for the Seattle Sounders and Portland Timbers (EWHS)
- Ali Gaye, NFL football player
- Keith Grennan, NFL football player for the San Diego Chargers
- Dave Hamilton, former left-handed pitcher who won 3 World Series championships with the Oakland Athletics (1972, 1973, 1974) (EHS)
- Bridget Hanley, actress (EHS; performed in school plays and talent shows)
- Blaine Hardy, pitcher for the Detroit Tigers (EWHS)
- Sota Kitahara, soccer player for the Seattle Sounders and Tacoma Defiance
- Matt "Fil" Leanderson, olympic rower
- Kyle Lukoff, children's book author
- Jeff Mickel, NFL football player for the Los Angeles Rams
- Jason Miller, communications strategist and political advisor
- Jay Park, singer, songwriter, rapper, actor, CEO of AOMG and Higher Music, Also More Vision(Dance Crew Agent) based in South Korea (EWHS)
- Dino Rossi, politician and businessman (WHS)
- James V. Scotti, an American astronomer
- Robert Shannon, 1980 and 1984 U.S. Olympic boxing team (WHS)
- Ben Somoza, retired soccer player for the Portland Timbers and Seattle Sounders
- Rick Steves, host of popular travel TV show Rick Steves' Europe and author of several books about traveling Europe on a budget (EHS)
- Tony Volpentest, paralympic athlete who won four gold medals and a silver medal at the Paralympic Games
- Richard "Rusty" Wailes, rower, 2x U.S. Olympic Gold Medalist (EHS)
- Elizabeth Yi, former member of indie rock band, Korea Girl
- Phil Zevenbergen, NBA basketball player (WHS)
