= For 100 We Try Harder =

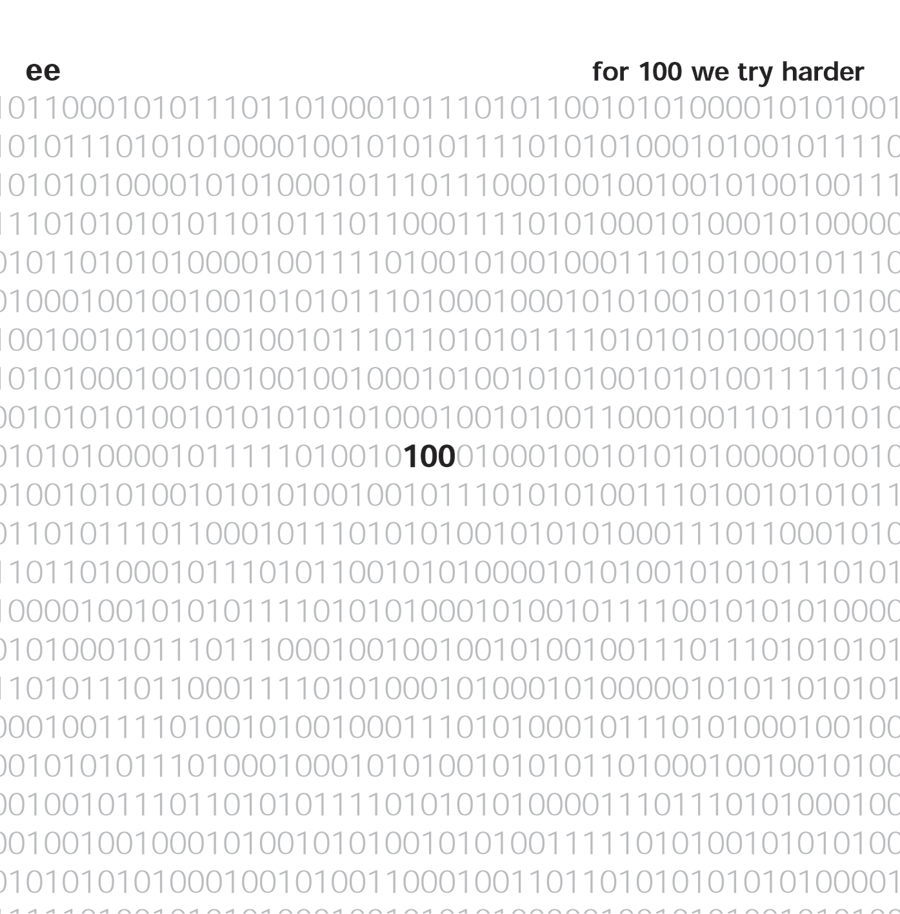

Studio album by ee
- Released: 2002
- Recorded: March 1–18, 2002
- Studio: Lucky Cat Studios (San Francisco)
- Genre: Indie rock; slowcore
- Length: 58:18
- Label: Asian Man
- Producer: Kurt Schlegel; ee

Ee chronology
Ramadan (2000)	For 100 We Try Harder (2002)	Capital Plans (2007)

For 100 We Try Harder is the second album by the American indie rock band ee. It was released in 2002 by Asian Man Records. It features a different lineup compared to the group's previous album, Ramadan. The album got a deluxe edition re-release in 2023 via 7th Heaven.

== Reception ==
Professional ratings
Review scores
Source	Rating
AllMusic	2.5/5 stars
Punknews.org	3.5/5 stars

Rick Anderson of AllMusic gave the records two and a half stars out of five stating that despite the "rambling instrumentals that are slow [and] moody", it sometimes becomes "boring" and that the "band is going to have to, well, try harder". Scott Heisel of Punknews.org gave it three and a half stars stating that fans of Seam, Built To Spill, and Hum should buy the album. Heisel praised the track "Drunk In Carthage" (mistakenly spelled as "Drunken Carthage") stating it as a "jammy slowcore song" and "the song alone is worth the 8 bucks Asian Man will ask you for this compact disc".

== Track listing ==
For 100 We Try Harder track listing
No.	Title	Length
1.	"Slow Motion Restart"	4:22
2.	"Beijing"	3:27
3.	"Thomas Sleeps Beneath an El Paso Tree"	6:52
4.	"Yellow Taraval"	5:13
5.	"Drunk in Carthage"	5:52
6.	"San Jose"	6:04
7.	"Tinyspot"	5:36
8.	"March of the Chogokin"	7:41
9.	"Subrosa"	5:05
30.	Untitled	2:30
66.	"Track 66"	2:13
99.	"Pilot Fish"	3:23
Total length:		58:18

Notes

- Tracks 17–29, 31–65, and 67–98 consist of a few seconds of silence On streaming services, these silent tracks are removed.

== Personnel ==
Personnel per liner notes. The album's packaging omitted the band member's last names.

ee

- Che Chou – bass guitar (track 1–9, 99), production (credited as "laptop") (track 30)
- Pete Nguyen – drums (track 1–9, 99), acoustic guitar and vocals (track 66)
- Tobin Mori – guitar, vocals, piano, banjo (track 1–9, 99)
- Sooyoung Park – guitar (track 1–9, 99)

Other personnel

- Kurt Schlegel – engineering, production
- John Golden – mastering
- Esther Reyes – cello (track 3)
- Elizabeth McAdams – vibraphone (track 99) (credited as "elizabeth mcadams vibes")
