= Lynnwood High School =

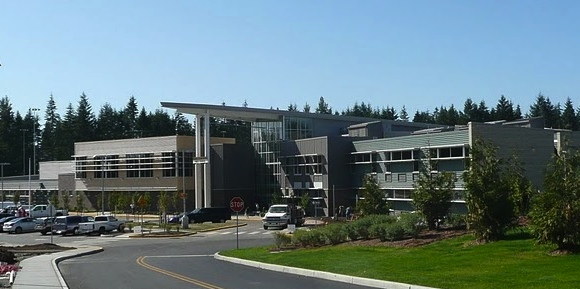
- Semper Regnans

Location
- 18218 North Road; Bothell, Washington 98012; United States; 47°50′02″N 122°14′23″W

Information
- Type: Public secondary school
- Motto: Home of the Royals
- Established: 1970 (Rebuilt, Relocated 2009)
- School district: Edmonds School District
- Principal: Jesse Goodsky
- Teaching staff: 60.52 (FTE)
- Grades: 9-12
- Enrollment: 1,335 (2024-2025)
- Average class size: ~23 (2012)
- Student to teacher ratio: 22.06
- Campus type: Suburban, co-educational
- Colors: Black, Gold & White
- Athletics conference: Wesco Conference South 3A division
- Mascot: Chimeras
- Team name: Royals
- Rival: Mountlake Terrace Highschool
- Newspaper: The Royal Gazette
- Website: lhs.edmonds.wednet.edu

Lynnwood High School is a high school in the Edmonds School District, located east of Lynnwood, Washington. The school has approximately 1335 students enrolled for grades 9–12. Lynnwood High School's mascot is a Chimera and athletic teams are known as Royals.

== Incidents ==
In September 2024, a Lynnwood High School student was arrested following a road rage incident during which a firearm was allegedly produced. According to the Snohomish County Sheriff's Office, the student pulled a gun while driving and later turned into the school premises. Parts of an assault rifle were found in the student's vehicle. The school went into full lockdown during the investigation, and normal operations resumed later that morning.

== Facilities ==
The school buildings are located on North Road, east of Lynnwood. The funding for construction was approved in 2006 and construction began in June 2007, after a wooded area was logged.

Designed by Bassetti Architects, the building was opened on September 8, 2009. It is configured around a central common space called The Agora, named after the Greek word for "place of assembly" and "marketplace". Four wings radiate from the Agora: two are two-story classroom wings, each organized into small learning communities which can also be used as academies or separate small schools; the others are a performing arts wing and an athletics wing. The gymnasium and performing arts wings are designed to function separately from the rest of the building outside of normal school hours.

=== Green features ===
Despite protests from some environmental groups, the school was built on a wooded area. West of the new football field are the remaining evergreen trees in a protected wetland. A natural area to the north of the school is protected wetland with a pond and trees. A storm water detention pond north of the football field diverts potentially polluted water from going into local creeks and waterways. Classrooms are not air conditioned but have natural convection ventilation. The buildings have received an Energy Star design certification. Its expected energy use is a reduction of 44 percent compared with an average building of similar type.

=== Design awards ===
The new building received the international annual design award of the Council of Educational Facilities Planners International for 2010, the James D. MacConnell Award for outstanding new educational facilities. In 2011 the new school was recognized as one of ten "Schools of the 21st Century – The Latest Thinking and Best Ideas on the Planning and Design of K-12 School Buildings", by Architectural Record magazine.

== Former location ==
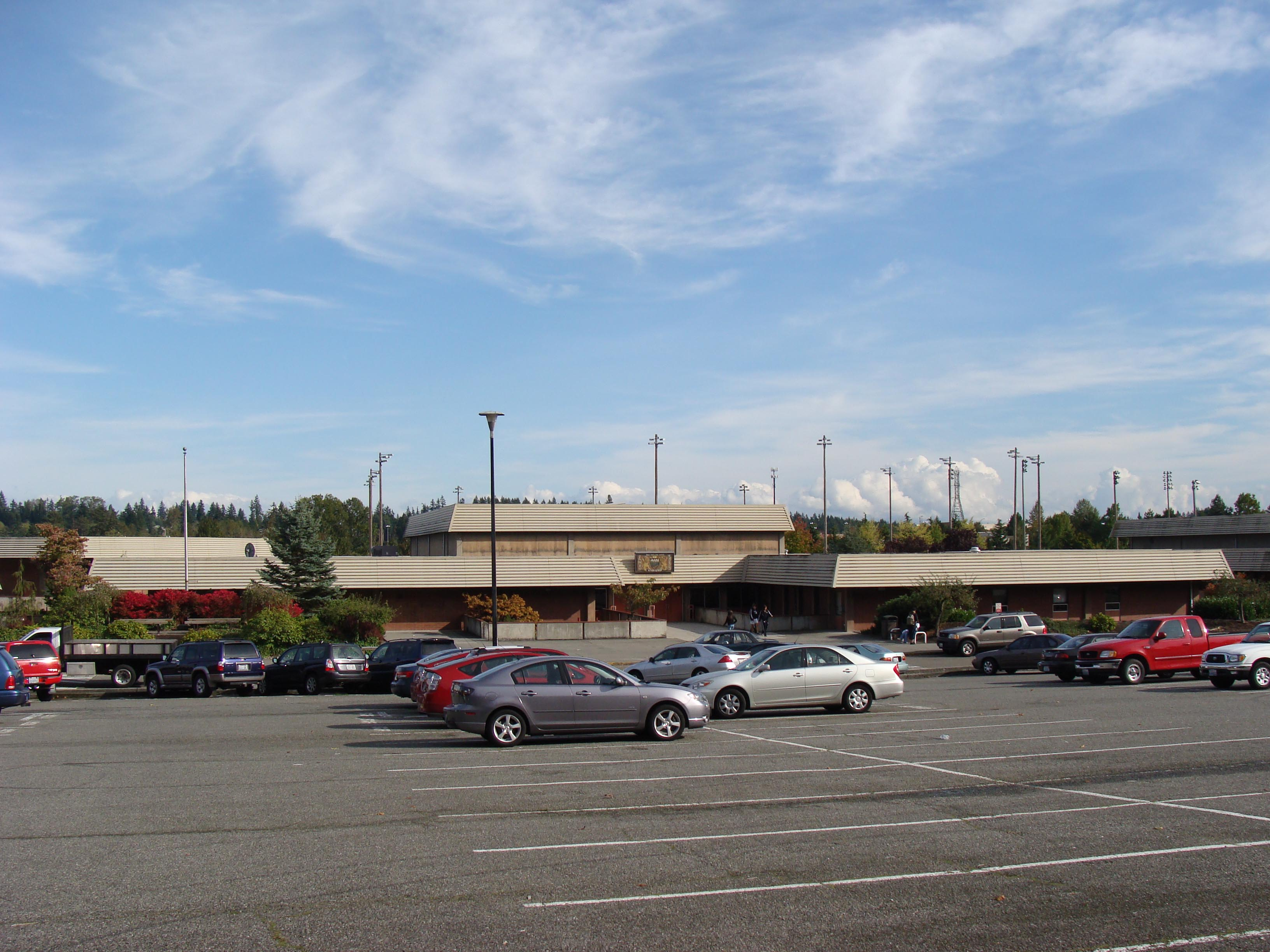
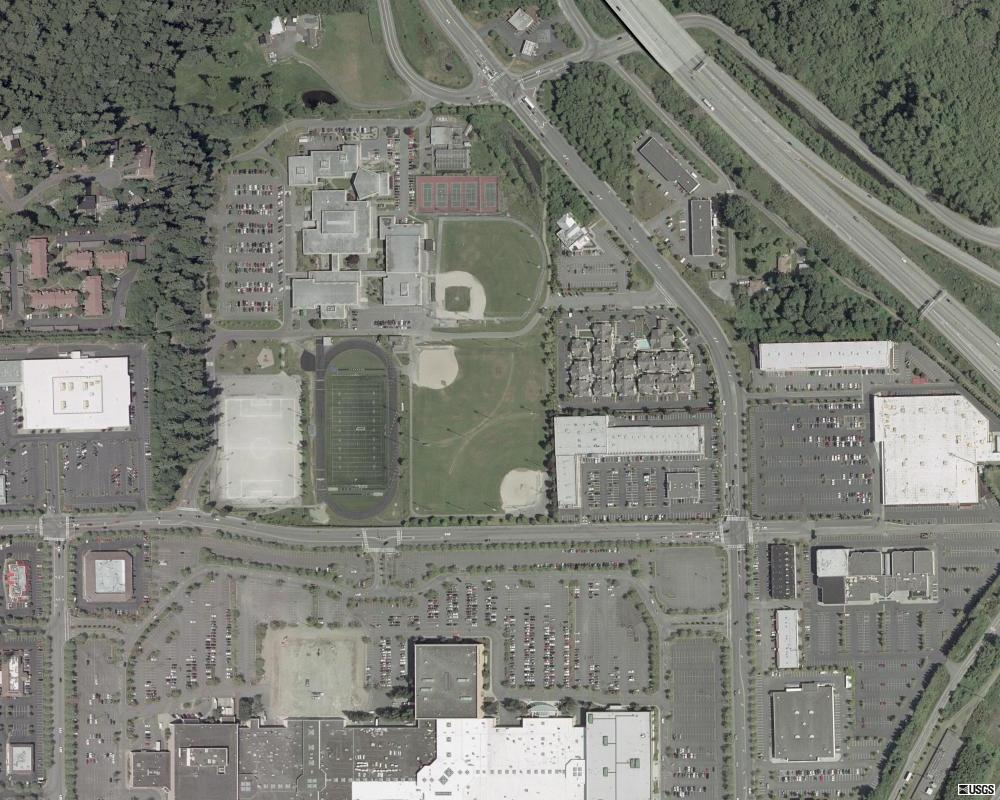
The former Lynnwood High School building was located to the north of the Alderwood Mall

The former Lynnwood High School, located at 3001 184th St SW, was built in 1969 atop an aquifer. That, alongside the school's architecture and general location, left it prone to flooding; the gymnasium experienced such an event in August 2004, forcing its closure for three months. After the high school's relocation, the site was vacant from 2009 to 2015. Demolition of the old high school began on August 3, 2010.

In October 2007, the Edmonds School District reached a deal with Texas-based Cypress Equities for a 99-year lease of the site. The site was redeveloped into a multi-use center called Lynnwood Place with retail and restaurant components. In December 2010 it was announced that Costco Wholesale would occupy 160,000 square feet (15,000 m^{2}) of the property. Construction started on the Costco in July 2014 and opened on October 1, 2015.

== Athletics ==
Lynnwood has a variety of different sports teams, playing in the Wesco Conference South 3A division. Lynnwood's traditional rival in athletics is Mountlake Terrace High School, although they do have crosstown rivalries with division rivals Meadowdale High School and Edmonds Woodway High School.

=== Football ===
Although known for their school spirit, The Lynnwood football team had a nearly historic losing streak in the state of Washington. The losing streak was snapped in 2004 following an overtime win against South Whidbey High School. In 2007 Lynnwood High School had their first multi-win season* in numerous years. In 2016 the team made their first state playoff appearance since 1995 when they defeated Garfield High School (Seattle) in a shootout 63–45.

=== Girls Basketball ===
Lynnwood girls basketball has reached the state tournament multiple times since the 2012–13 season. In the 2014–15 season, the basketball team claimed their first ever state title when they beat Cleveland High School by a score of 54–42 in the Tacoma Dome.

=== Volleyball ===
Lynnwood volleyball has reached state three consecutive years from the 2022–23 season to 2024–25 season. In 2023 the volleyball team placed 3rd in state after having a nearly undefeated season with only one loss during state. In 2024 the volleyball team placed 8th in state.

=== State championships ===
- Girls basketball: 2015
- Track and field: 1991, 1994, 2016

== Notable alumni ==
- Randy Couture - retired professional mixed martial artist, former UFC Light Heavyweight and Heavyweight Champion
- Mikayla Pivec - professional basketball player WNBA
- Ijeoma Oluo - Writer, Social Critic
- Orlondo Steinauer - retired CFL player, current head coach of the Hamilton Tigercats in the CFL.
- Brett Mitchell - Conductor and music director of the Colorado Symphony
- Katie Thurston - Contestant on Season 25 of The Bachelor, Lead of Season 17 of The Bachelorette
- Jennifer Goeckel - Paralympian, wheelchair athlete, U.S. Paralympic Track & Field 2008, 2004

== See also ==
- Edmonds School District
