= Umber (album) =

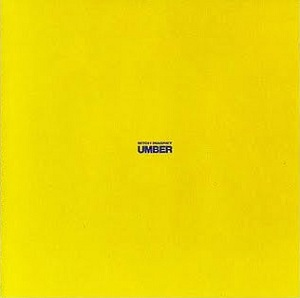

Studio album by Bitch Magnet
- Released: September 15, 1989
- Recorded: June 14–15, 1989
- Studio: Waterfront Studios (Hoboken, New Jersey)
- Genre: Post-hardcore, noise rock
- Length: 35:47
- Label: Glitterhouse Records
- Producer: Bitch Magnet, Mike McMackin

Bitch Magnet chronology
Star Booty (1988)	Umber (1989)	Ben Hur (1990)

Umber is the first full-length album by the American post-hardcore band Bitch Magnet. The band had added second guitarist David Galt since their previous year's release, the eight-song EP Star Booty. In 2004 Umber was listed in Mojo's "Lost Albums You Must Own".

== Music ==
Music journalist Andrew Earles described the sound on Umber as "an aggressive and heavy approach to post-hardcore/indie rock that had a lot in common with the aggro noise rock that dominated the Amphetamine Reptile and late-'80s Touch and Go rosters." However, Earles stated that Umber "lacked the unweildy, testosterone-fueled depravity and nihilism" of these albums, and that the album instead "[relies] on the hazy, often buried but melodic" vocals of Sooyoung Park. Jason Ankeny of AllMusic described the album's third track "Clay" as a "taut exploration of extremist spatial dynamics." He described the album's fifth track "Douglas Leader" as a "quietly hypnotic minimalist ode 180-degrees removed from everything else in the Bitch Magnet oeuvre to date."

== Release and reception ==
Professional ratings
Review scores
Source	Rating
Allmusic	3.5/5 stars
Uncut	5/5 stars

Umber was first released in 1989 on LP by Glitterhouse Records with an all yellowish-umber colored cover with the band's name and album title set in a small bold font at its center. The record's 10 tracks were paired with the band's previous eight-song EP, Star Booty, and issued by Communion on cassette and CD that same year.

Jason Ankeny of AllMusic gave the album three and a half stars out of five.

In 2011, Umber was remastered by Alan Douches and released in a box-set containing with the rest of the band's catalog.

== Track listing ==
All songs written by Bitch Magnet

No.	Title	Length
1.	"Motor"	3:48
2.	"Navajo Ace"	2:33
3.	"Clay"	3:38
4.	"Joan of Arc"	2:35
5.	"Douglas Leader"	4:48
6.	"Goat-Legged Country God"	3:05
7.	"Big Pining"	3:17
8.	"Joyless Street"	2:17
9.	"Punch and Judy"	2:54
10.	"Americruiser"	6:52

The 2011 box-set also contains alternate versions "Motor", "Joan of Arc", "Big Pining", "Joyless Street" and "Punch and Judy".

== Personnel ==
Bitch Magnet

- Orestes Delatorre – drums
- Jon Fine – guitar
- David Galt – guitar
- Sooyoung Park – bass guitar, vocals

Additional musicians and production

- Bitch Magnet – production
- Karan Filian – backing vocals on "Big Pining"
- Lou Gehrig – backing vocals on "Big Pining"
- Mike McMackin – production, recording
