= Scriber Lake High School =

Coordinates: 47°47′13″N 122°22′07″W

Location
- 23200 100th Ave W Edmonds, Washington 98020; United States

Information
- Type: Public (School of Choice) Secondary School
- School district: Edmonds School District
- Principal: Mike Piper
- Faculty: 16.74 (FTE)
- Grades: 9, 10, 11, 12
- Enrollment: 185 (2023-24)
- Student to teacher ratio: 11.05
- Campus type: Suburban
- Mascot: Panthers
- Website: https://slhs.edmonds.wednet.edu/

Scriber Lake High School (SLHS), located in the city of Edmonds, Washington, is one of five high schools within the Edmonds School District. It is the only high school of choice within the district.

== History ==
The original Scriber Lake campus was a Quonset hut built in the early 1950s and housed Lynnwood Junior High School from 1954 till it closed in 1981. Scriber Lake High School was established on the campus and remained there until 2007.

At the end of the 2006–2007 school year, the school campus was closed to make room for Cedar Valley Elementary School and everything was moved to the former Woodway High School campus, which Scriber Lake High School shares with Edmonds Heights K-12, the Edmonds e-Learning Academy, and the VOICE adult transitional program.
