= Kernel (EP) =

EP by Seam
- Released: February 15, 1993
- Recorded: September–October 1992
- Studio: Idful, Chicago, Illinois
- Genre: Indie rock, slowcore
- Length: 15:12
- Label: Touch and Go
- Producer: Seam

Seam chronology
Headsparks (1992)	Kernel (1993)	The Problem with Me (1993)

Professional ratings
Review scores
Source	Rating
AllMusic	3/5 stars

Kernel is an EP by indie rock band Seam. It was released on February 15, 1993 through Touch and Go Records. It contains two new songs, an alternate take of "Shame" and a cover of Breaking Circus.

== Track listing ==
No.	Title	Writer(s)	Length
1.	"Kernel"	Seam	3:21
2.	"Sweet Pea"	Seam	3:34
3.	"Shame"	Mark Saltzman	2:13
4.	"Driving the Dynamite Truck"	Steve Bjorklund, Pete Conway, Brian Paulson, Tony Pucci	6:04

== Personnel ==
Seam

- John McEntire – drums
- Lexi Mitchell – bass guitar
- Sooyoung Park – vocals, guitar

Production and additional personnel

- Seam – production
- Brad Wood – engineering
