= List of Eastern Washington Eagles in the NFL draft =

This is a list of Eastern Washington Eagles football players in the NFL draft.

== Key ==
| B | Back | K | Kicker | NT | Nose tackle |
| C | Center | LB | Linebacker | FB | Fullback |
| DB | Defensive back | P | Punter | HB | Halfback |
| DE | Defensive end | QB | Quarterback | WR | Wide receiver |
| DT | Defensive tackle | RB | Running back | G | Guard |
| E | End | T | Offensive tackle | TE | Tight end |

== Selections ==
| Year | Round | Pick | Player | Team | Position |
|---|---|---|---|---|---|
| 1959 | 18 | 205 | Dick Nearents | Green Bay Packers | T |
| 1969 | 11 | 281 | Dave Svendsen | Los Angeles Rams | WR |
| 1973 | 6 | 132 | Bob Picard | Philadelphia Eagles | WR |
| 1974 | 7 | 179 | Scott Garske | Pittsburgh Steelers | TE |
| 1987 | 6 | 164 | Ed Simmons | Washington Redskins | T |
| 1987 | 11 | 298 | Craig Richardson | Kansas City Chiefs | WR |
| 1989 | 6 | 163 | Jeff Mickel | Minnesota Vikings | T |
| 1992 | 7 | 195 | Kurt Schulz | Buffalo Bills | DB |
| 1994 | 5 | 132 | Trent Pollard | Cincinnati Bengals | T |
| 1996 | 5 | 145 | Tom Ackerman | New Orleans Saints | G |
| 2002 | 6 | 195 | Lamont Brightful | Baltimore Ravens | WR |
| 2003 | 5 | 148 | Dan Curley | St. Louis Rams | TE |
| 2005 | 2 | 41 | Michael Roos | Tennessee Titans | T |
| 2011 | 4 | 125 | Taiwan Jones | Oakland Raiders | RB |
| 2012 | 4 | 135 | Matt Johnson | Dallas Cowboys | DB |
| 2015 | 7 | 225 | Jake Rodgers | Atlanta Falcons | T |
| 2017 | 3 | 69 | Cooper Kupp | Los Angeles Rams | WR |
| 2017 | 4 | 125 | Samson Ebukam | Los Angeles Rams | LB |
