= Edmonds School District =

Public school system in Edmonds, Washington, U.S. and surrounding areas

Address
- 20420 68th Avenue West Lynnwood, Washington, 98036; United States
- Coordinates: 47.8136°N 122.3262°W

District information
- Type: Public
- Grades: Pre-K–12
- Established: 1884
- Superintendent: Dr. Rebecca Miner
- Governing agency: Washington State Office of Superintendent of Public Instruction
- Schools: 34
- Budget: $407.4 million (2017–18)
- NCES District ID: 5302400

Students and staff
- Students: 21,727 (2019–20)
- Teachers: 1,134.73 (2019–20)
- Staff: 1,713.29 (2019–20)
- Student–teacher ratio: 19.15 (2019–20)
- Athletic conference: WIAA

Other information
- Website: www.edmonds.wednet.edu

Edmonds School District No. 15 is the public school district of Edmonds, Washington, United States. It serves the entire city as well as the cities of Lynnwood, Mountlake Terrace, Woodway, and Brier along with parts of unincorporated Snohomish County.

== History ==
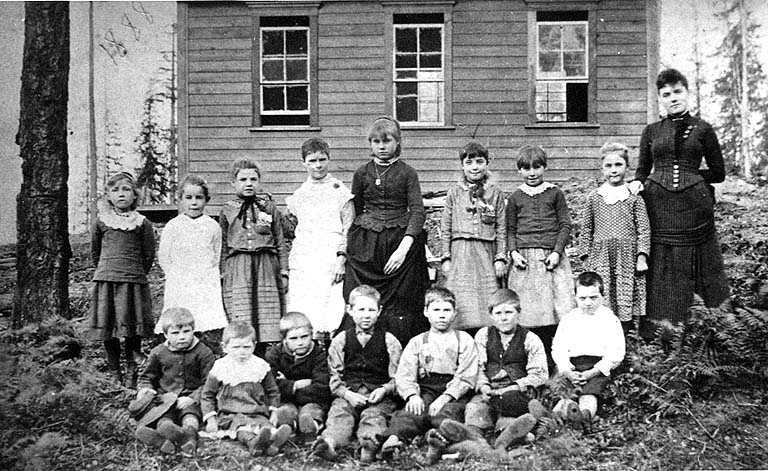
Teacher and children outside of the first schoolhouse in Edmonds in 1888.

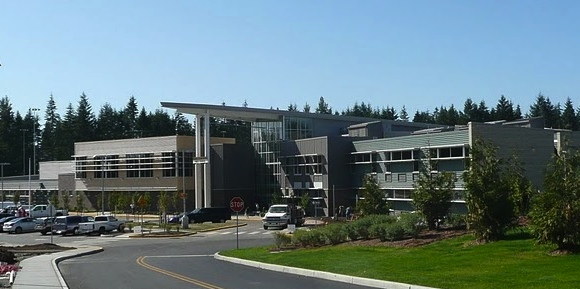
Lynnwood High School, rebuilt and relocated to Bothell, Washington, in the northeast quadrant of the district, in 2009.

Edmonds School District No. 15 was established in 1884 in a feed barn owned by settler George Brackett in downtown Edmonds. A one-room schoolhouse was built shortly after. As the student population grew, a grade school was built in 1891. In 1909, a high school was built, the first in South Snohomish County. Students came from outlying areas including Meadowdale, Cedar Valley and Maple Leaf (present-day Lynnwood) to attend the Edmonds schools, leading the district to seek transportation services to meet students' needs, contracting with the Yost Automobile Company from 1912 to 1933. In 1963, Edmonds School District received national attention for its ungraded school, Maple Park Elementary School in Lynnwood, the first of its kind in the Pacific Northwest.

== Schools ==
=== List of schools ===
==== High schools ====
- Edmonds-Woodway High School
- Lynnwood High School
- Meadowdale High School
- Mountlake Terrace High School
- Scriber Lake High School
- Edmonds eLearning Academy (accepts middle school students; part-time or full-time)

===== Facilities distribution =====
Within the school district, each high school was given one main facility to serve all the other high schools. Mountlake Terrace holds the largest theater, with over 300 seats and an orchestra pit; and Edmonds Woodway has the official football stadium, serving as home turf for Mountlake Terrace, Edmonds, Meadowdale, and Lynnwood. The stadium is also the only stadium to host all the football, soccer, and track meets.

==== Middle schools ====
- Alderwood Middle School (Feeds into Lynnwood High or Mountlake Terrace High)
- Brier Terrace Middle School (Feeds into Mountlake Terrace High or Lynnwood High)
- College Place Middle School (Feeds into Edmonds-Woodway High)
- Meadowdale Middle School (Feeds into Meadowdale High)

==== Alternative programs ====
- Edmonds Heights K-12

==== K-8 schools ====
- Madrona K-8
- Maplewood Parent Cooperative

==== Elementary schools ====
- Beverly Elementary School (Feeds into Meadowdale Middle)
- Brier Elementary School (Feeds into Brier Terrace Middle)
- Cedar Valley Community School (Feeds into Alderwood Middle)
- Cedar Way Elementary School (feeds into Brier Terrace Middle)
- Chase Lake Community School (Feeds into College Place Middle)
- College Place Elementary School (Feeds into College Place Middle)
- Edmonds Elementary School (Feeds into College Place Middle or Meadowdale Middle)
- Hazelwood Elementary School (Feeds into Alderwood Middle)
- Hilltop Elementary School (Feeds into Brier Terrace Middle or Alderwood Middle)
- Lynndale Elementary School (Feeds into Meadowdale Middle)
- Lynnwood Elementary School (Feeds into Alderwood Middle)
- Martha Lake Elementary School (Feeds into Alderwood Middle)
- Meadowdale Elementary School (Feeds into Meadowdale Middle)
- Mountlake Terrace Elementary School (feeds into Brier Terrace Middle)
- Oak Heights Elementary School (Feeds into Alderwood Middle)
- Seaview Elementary School (Feeds into Meadowdale Middle)
- Sherwood Elementary School (Feeds into College Place Middle)
- Spruce Elementary School (Feeds into Meadowdale Middle)
- Terrace Park School (Feeds into Brier Terrace Middle)
- Westgate Elementary School (Feeds into College Place Middle)

=== Feeder pattern ===
The feeder pattern is projected to change in 2028, upon the completion of a new middle school and the movement of sixth grade programs from elementary to middle school.

Edmonds School District Feeder Pattern
Elementary School	Middle School		High School		
Chase Lake Community School	College Place		Edmonds-Woodway		Scriber Lake (Note: This high school accepts students from any middle school plus Alderwood Mall High.)
College Place	College Place		Edmonds-Woodway		Scriber Lake
Sherwood	College Place		Edmonds-Woodway		Scriber Lake
Westgate	College Place		Edmonds-Woodway		Scriber Lake
Edmonds (Note: Edmonds Elementary School students have two middle school pathways, with two different high school pathway.)	College Place		Edmonds-Woodway		Scriber Lake
Edmonds	Meadowdale Middle School		Meadowdale High School		Scriber Lake
Beverly	Meadowdale Middle School		Meadowdale High School		Scriber Lake
Lynndale	Meadowdale Middle School		Meadowdale High School		Scriber Lake
Meadowdale Elementary School	Meadowdale Middle School		Meadowdale High School		Scriber Lake
Seaview	Meadowdale Middle School		Meadowdale High School		Scriber Lake
Spruce	Meadowdale Middle School		Meadowdale High School		Scriber Lake
Cedar Valley Community School	Alderwood (Note: Alderwood Middle School students from Hazelwood Elementary School have three high school pathways.)		Lynnwood High School		Scriber Lake
Lynnwood Elementary School	Alderwood		Lynnwood High School		Scriber Lake
Martha Lake	Alderwood		Lynnwood High School		Scriber Lake
Oak Heights	Alderwood		Lynnwood High School		Scriber Lake
Hazelwood (Note: Hazelwood Elementary School students have three high school pathways.)	Alderwood		Lynnwood High School	Mountlake Terrace High School	Scriber Lake
Hilltop (Note: Hilltop Elementary School students have two middle school pathways, and three of the same high school pathways.)	Alderwood (Note: Alderwood Middle School students from Hilltop Elementary School have three of the same high school pathways.)	Brier Terrace Middle School (Note: Brier Terrace Middle School students from Hilltop Elementary School have three high school pathways.)	Lynnwood High School	Mountlake Terrace High School	Scriber Lake
Brier	Brier Terrace Middle School		Mountlake Terrace High School		Scriber Lake
Cedar Way	Brier Terrace Middle School		Mountlake Terrace High School		Scriber Lake
Mountlake Terrace Elementary School	Brier Terrace Middle School		Mountlake Terrace High School		Scriber Lake
Terrace Park School	Brier Terrace Middle School		Mountlake Terrace High School		Scriber Lake
Choice Elementary School	Edmonds eLearning Academy (Note: Students can attend EeLA part-time (still attending their current middle/high school), or full-time (going to school at EeLA exclusively).) (Note: This middle school accepts students from any elementary school.) (Note: This high school accepts students from any middle school.)				
Choice Elementary School	Choice Middle School		Choice High School		
Madrona K-8 School (Note: This elementary school accepts students regardless of home adderess.) (Note: This middle school accepts students from any elementary school.)			Choice High School		
Maplewood Parent Cooperative (Note: This elementary school accepts students regardless of home adderess.) (Note: This middle school accepts students from any elementary school.)			Choice High School		
Edmonds Heights K-12 (Note: This elementary school accepts students regardless of home adderess.) (Note: This middle school accepts students from any elementary school.) (Note: This high school accepts students from any middle school.)
