= Ramadan (album) =

Studio album by ee
- Released: 2000
- Genre: Indie rock
- Length: 38:06
- Label: Curry; Asian Man

Ee chronology
Ramadan (2000)	For 100 We Try Harder (2002)

Ramadan is the debut studio album by the American indie rock band ee. It was originally released in 2000 on Curry Records, and released by Asian Man Records on December 16, 2003. The album received a re-release in 2022 via 7th Heaven.

== Reception ==
Professional ratings
Review scores
Source	Rating
AllMusic	3/5 stars

AC Lerok of the magazine Skratch called it "an extremely emotional record, evoking an array of sentiments throughout the 10-track disk". Rick Anderson of AllMusic gave it three stars out of five, stating that "[ee]'s songs are slow and thoughtful, sometimes depressing, but usually just quiet". Choi Ji-seon of Weiv called it "melancholy [...] rather than the upbeat, mid-tempo feel of Korea Girl".

== Track listing ==
Ramadan track listing
No.	Title	Length
1.	"Sutro (Heroin Jazz Mix)"	4:50
2.	"Asian Gangsta Kidz"	3:23
3.	"Ramadan"	3:41
4.	"Battery Davis"	3:45
5.	"Wrong Song"	3:36
6.	"Retrace"	3:51
7.	"Square Back"	3:20
8.	"One Less Year"	3:51
9.	"Sutro (Supernova Whale Mix)"	5:18
10.	"Brace"	2:32
Total length:		38:06
