= The Pace Is Glacial =

Studio album by Seam
- Released: September 29, 1998
- Recorded: December 1997 – January 1998
- Studio: Electrical Audio (Chicago, Illinois)
- Genre: Indie rock; slowcore; post-hardcore; emocore
- Length: 48:30
- Label: Touch and Go
- Producer: Brian Paulson

Seam chronology
Are You Driving Me Crazy? (1995)	The Pace Is Glacial (1998)

Professional ratings
Review scores
Source	Rating
AllMusic	3/5 stars
Pitchfork Media	6.6/10

The Pace Is Glacial is the fourth and final studio album by American indie rock band Seam. It was released in 1998 on Touch and Go Records.

== Critical reception ==
The Chicago Tribune wrote that Seam "distills its no-frills guitar rock into a tight collection of creeper melodies and haunting ruminations on who-knows-what that are nonetheless emotionally resonant." The Sunday Times thought that "while tiny fragments of noise circle the peripheries of 'Little Chang' and 'The Prizefighters', there's always a moment when the weirdness coalesces into an irresistible rock riff."

== Track listing ==
All tracks are written by Seam.

No.	Title	Length
1.	"Little Chang, Big City"	4:54
2.	"Get Higher"	3:03
3.	"Wig"	1:31
4.	"Intifada Driving School"	3:15
5.	"Kanawha"	4:20
6.	"Nisei Fight Song"	7:23
7.	"The Prizefighters"	2:59
8.	"In the Sun"	3:23
9.	"Inching Towards Juárez"	6:28
10.	"Pale Marble Movie"	5:26
11.	"Aloha Spirit"	5:48

== Personnel ==
Seam

- Chris Manfrin – drums
- Sooyoung Park – vocals, guitar
- Reg Shrader – guitar
- William Shin – bass guitar

Production and additional personnel

- Rob Bochnik – engineering on "Aloha Spirit"
- K. Kiyota – photography
- Brian Paulson – recording
- Jo Yu – backing vocals
