= Bitch Magnet (album) =

Box set by Bitch Magnet
- Released: December 6, 2011
- Recorded: October 25, 1987–July 14, 1990
- Genre: Post-hardcore
- Length: 115:28
- Label: Temporary Residence Limited

Bitch Magnet chronology
Ben Hur (1990)	Bitch Magnet (2011)

Professional ratings
Aggregate scores
Source	Rating
Metacritic	(91/100)
Review scores
Source	Rating
Allmusic	4/5 stars
The A.V. Club	(A−)
Consequence of Sound	4.5/5 stars
Drowned in Sound	(8/10)
Mojo	4/5 stars
Rolling Stone	4/5 stars
Uncut	5/5 stars

Bitch Magnet is a career-spanning three-disc box-set of the band Bitch Magnet, released on December 6, 2011, through Temporary Residence Limited. It contains all of the band's recorded output, including two studio albums, an EP, and alternate mixes of previously released songs. The tracks were completely remastered by Alan Douches for their inclusion in the set.

== Track listing ==
All tracks are written by Bitch Magnet.

Disc one
No.	Title	Length
1.	"Dragoon"	9:31
2.	"Valmead"	3:33
3.	"Ducks and Drakes"	4:34
4.	"Mesentery"	2:33
5.	"Lookin' at the Devil"	3:37
6.	"Gator"	2:12
7.	"Spite y Malice"	3:07
8.	"Crescent"	4:41
9.	"White Piece of Bread"	4:05
10.	"Sadie"	1:36

Disc two
No.	Title	Length
1.	"Motor"	3:47
2.	"Navajo Ace"	2:29
3.	"Clay"	3:37
4.	"Joan of Arc"	2:32
5.	"Douglas Leader"	4:45
6.	"Goat-Legged Country God"	3:04
7.	"Big Pining"	3:15
8.	"Joyless Street"	2:17
9.	"Punch and Judy"	2:49
10.	"Americruiser"	6:48
11.	"Motor" (alternate mix)	3:46

Disc three
No.	Title	Length
1.	"Punch and Judy" (alternate mix)	2:51
2.	"Joan of Arc" (alternate mix)	2:36
3.	"Big Pining" (alternate mix)	3:26
4.	"Joyless Street" (alternate mix)	2:17
5.	"Sadie" (alternate mix)	1:31
6.	"Carnation"	3:06
7.	"Chord"	2:30
8.	"Sea of Pearls"	3:41
9.	"Hatpins"	1:46
10.	"Knucklehead"	3:02
11.	"Circle K"	3:24
12.	"Polio"	2:33
13.	"Cantaloupe" (live)	4:09

== Personnel ==
Bitch Magnet

- Orestes Delatorre – drums
- Jon Fine – guitar
- Dave Galt – guitar on Umber
- Sooyoung Park – bass guitar, vocals

Production and additional personnel

- Jeremy DeVine – art direction, design
- Alan Douches – remastering
