= Paul Filipowicz =

American Chicago blues musician

- Born: Paul Filipowicz; March 24, 1950 (age 75); Chicago, Illinois, United States
- Genres: Chicago blues
- Occupation(s): Singer, guitarist, harmonicist, songwriter
- Instrument(s): Vocals, guitar, harmonica
- Years active: Mid 1970s–present
- Website: Official website

Paul Filipowicz (born March 24, 1950) is an American Chicago blues musician. He is a singer, guitarist, and harmonica player, who writes some of his own material. To date, Filipowicz has released eight albums. Filipowicz has fronted his own band for over forty years and played across most of the United States. His friend, Luther Allison, once told Filipowicz "I know you're a bluesman and you know you're a bluesman and every time you take the stage you got to prove it!"

An inductee of the Chicago Blues Hall of Fame, Filipowicz currently lives in Madison, Wisconsin.

== Career ==
Filipowicz was born in Chicago, Illinois, United States, and raised in the Lockport, Illinois corn fields. With his sisters playing the piano, the whole family sang at their local church, but otherwise only had access to music via their radio. Paul accidentally found a radio station playing blues music, before witnessing Otis Rush in around 1964 by standing outside a club in South Side, Chicago. Filipowicz stated "my biggest influences began with Otis Rush and Magic Sam, I love that West Side, Chicago sound – I really was drawn to Magic Sam's finger-picking style, even though I never got the chance to see him."

The first instrument he had learned to play was the harmonica, gaining tuition from his father. The basic rudiments he then transferred to playing a guitar and learned by ear from listening to others.By 1969, Filipowicz played a modified eight string guitar, and harmonica on a rack, and performed on parks and street corners for tips. What he considered to be his first professional booking was in 1971, when he was paid $15 a night for three nights at the Mint Lounge in Milwaukee, Wisconsin. Paul Butterfield remained popular around that time and Filipowicz occasionally played the harmonica in his backing band. However, it was Otis Rush, Buddy Guy, Freddie King, and Magic Sam as the West Side Chicago blues mainstays that Filipowicz yearned to emulate. When he got his first band together in 1976, the first major blues musician they opened for was Mighty Joe Young, who encouraged Filipowicz to develop his own style. Two other West Side blues icons also inspired Filipowicz in that period; Jimmy Dawkins and Hound Dog Taylor.

His first album, What Have You Done for Me Lately, was released in 1999 on Orchard Records. This was followed by Midnight at the Nairobi Room (2001) and Go for the Throat (2003). In 2004, Filipowicz made a special guest appearance at the 'Luther Allison Celebration' in Madison, Wisconsin, as a homage to his old friend who had died several years earlier. Filipowicz's next release was Chinatown (2004). Ken Saydak, who Filipowicz had met many years earlier, played piano on that album. Chickenwire (2007) was a live album and described by one reviewer as "quite possibly one of the finest and nastiest live blues records ever made..."

In 2012, Blues Matters! carried an article about Filipowicz, and his growing global presence was fuelled by coverage on the internet. Filipowicz noted "I've had to cut back to a three-piece, with an occasional extra member", and that trio played on most of the tracks on Saints & Sinners (2013).

Filipowicz's album Unfiltered, was released on June 28, 2018. It contained five original songs written by Filipowicz. It also comprised a version of Magic Sam's "All My Whole Life Baby", Willie Dixon's "Howlin' For My Darlin'", Little Milton's "I Found a New Love", plus the Bob Geddins penned "Tin Pan Alley", and a cover of "Lowell Fulson's "Reconsider Baby".

Over the years of playing and touring, Filipowicz's venue of choice is the American roadhouse. He has written around 70 songs, and more recently has embraced recording digitally rather than the older analog system. Away from music, Filipowicz is constructing a log lodge in northern Wisconsin, and enjoys working on his 1949 Ford hot rod truck.

== Discography ==
Year	Title	Label	Notes
1999	What Have You Done for Me Lately	Orchard Records	
2001	Midnight at the Nairobi Room	Big Jake Records	
2003	Go for the Throat	GiLa Music	
2004	Chinatown	Big Jake Records	
2007	Chickenwire	Big Jake Records	Live album
2013	Saints & Sinners	Big Jake Records	
2015	Roughneck Blues	CD Baby	Live album
2018	Unfiltered	Big Jake Records	
2022	Pier 43	Big Jake Records	

== See also ==
- List of Chicago blues musicians
- List of musicians from Chicago
