= Cedar Park Christian School =

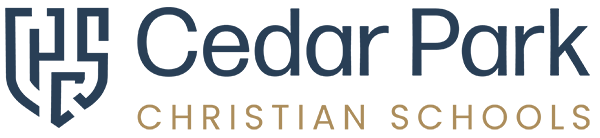

Location
- Bothell, Washington; United States; 47°44′48″N 122°11′21.6″W

Information
- Type: Christian
- Motto: Transforming hearts and minds in a decidedly Christian community
- Established: 1982
- Superintendent: Blair Bryant
- Faculty: District - 111 teachers
- Grades: Preschool – 12th grade
- Enrollment: Over 1000 students
- Colors: Blue and Gold, Purple, Yellow
- Mascot: Eagle, Internationals, Lions
- Accreditation: Association of Christian Teachers and Schools, Cognia, National Council for Private School Accreditation
- Religion: Christian - Assemblies of God
- Website: cpcsschools.com

Cedar Park Christian School is a private Christian school with four campuses: Bothell, Mill Creek, Bellevue, and Lynnwood. The school is associated with a church in Bothell of the same name with branch churches in Kenmore, Woodinville, Duvall, and Redmond. The church also runs a cemetery on the Bothell campus. As of 2020, CPCS has 1,591 students and a student/teacher ratio of 19:1. The racial breakdown is 62.8% White, 13.9% Asian, 3.5% African American, 2.5% two or more races, 0.4% American Indian, and 14.4% not specified. There is a 2.3% Hispanic or Latino demographic.

== History ==
Cedar Park Christian School was founded by Pastor Joe Fuiten in 1982 with eight preschool students and the first graduating class in 1997. Until the 1994 school year, Cedar Park Christian School consisted of a single campus of approximately 300 students. In 2004, the new high school building was completed.

== Lynnwood Campus ==
Before becoming Cedar Park, the Lynnwood Campus, then Maple Park Elementary School of the Edmonds School District, received national attention in 1963 for establishing the first ungraded school in the Pacific Northwest.

Cedar Park's Lynnwood Campus has a total enrollment in 2024-25 of 181 students in secondary, with 17 graduating seniors. The Lynnwood Campus also hosts a preschool and elementary school.

== Graduation Count ==
Year	Grad Count
2012	110
2013	110
2014	Unknown
2015	87
2016	81
2017	80

== Athletics ==
Cedar Park Bothell competes in the Emerald Sound league of WIAA RPI.

=== Football ===
==== Football High School Head Coach ====
2001 - 2008 Greg Salios 2008 - 2011 Craig Shetterly 2011 - 2014 Todd Parmenter 2014 - 2017 Bill Marsh 2017 - 2019 Butch Goncharoff 2019 - 2022 Manase Hopoi

==== Football Awards ====
1A State Tournament: 2003, 2004, 2005, 2006, 2007, 2008

== Accreditation ==
Cedar Park Christian Schools is approved by the State of Washington and is accredited by AdvancED, The National Council for Private School Accreditation (NCPSA), and The Association of Christian Teachers and Schools (ACTS).
