= The Problem with Me =

Studio album by Seam
- Released: September 21, 1993
- Recorded: 1993
- Studio: Idful, Chicago, Illinois
- Genre: Indie rock, slowcore, emo
- Length: 36:57
- Label: Touch and Go
- Producer: Brad Wood

Seam chronology
Kernel (1993)	The Problem with Me (1993)	Are You Driving Me Crazy? (1995)

Professional ratings
Review scores
Source	Rating
AllMusic	4.5/5 stars
Chicago Tribune	3.5/4 stars
The Encyclopedia of Popular Music	3/5 stars
MusicHound Rock: The Essential Album Guide	3.5/5 stars

The Problem with Me is the second album by American indie rock band Seam. It was released in 1993 through Touch and Go Records.

== Critical reception ==
Magnet wrote: "Nine blissfully hypnotic songs circled [Sooyoung] Park's sadness and anger, building up tension and releasing it in a crash of restrained guitars and half-shouted vocals." Spin called the album "completely enveloping—a soft swirl of mood music with echoes of loneliness and confusion."

== Legacy ==
Andrew Earles, in Gimme Indie Rock: 500 Essential American Underground Rock Albums 1981–1996, wrote that the album "would be hugely influential on the first wave of '90s emo bands and related practitioners of semi-popular indie rock" throughout the rest of the decade.

== Track listing ==
All tracks are written by Seam.

No.	Title	Length
1.	"Rafael"	2:23
2.	"Bunch"	3:26
3.	"Road to Madrid"	5:59
4.	"Stage 2000"	3:28
5.	"Sweet Pea"	3:33
6.	"Dust and Turpentine"	4:09
7.	"Something's Burning"	4:07
8.	"The Wild Cat"	5:24
9.	"Autopilot"	4:28

== Personnel ==
Seam

- Lexi Mitchell – bass guitar
- Sooyoung Park – vocals, guitar
- Bob Rising – drums
- Craig White – guitar

Production and additional personnel

- Bundy K. Brown – EBow on "Road to Madrid" and "Sweet Pea"
- John McEntire – drums on "Road to Madrid"
- Brad Wood – recording
