= Korea Girl =

American indie rock band

- Origin: San Jose, California
- Genres: Indie rock; indie pop; slacker rock; twee pop
- Years active: 1996–1999, 2026
- Labels: Asian Man, Korean Muzaac, Not Happy, 7th Heaven
- Spinoffs: Ee
- Past members: Elizabeth Yi; Tobin Mori; Summer Farnese; Mark Duarte; Scott Landucci; Jennifer Yee; Jamie Stewart

Korea Girl was an American indie rock band from San Jose, California. The band's best known lineup was composed of Elizabeth Yi (vocals, guitars), Tobin Mori (guitars, keyboards, vocals), Summer Farnese (bass guitar), and Marc Duarte (drums). Drummer Scott Landucci and bassist Jennifer Yee replaced Duarte and Farnese after both members left the band in 1997. Xiu Xiu frontperson Jamie Stewart was also briefly a member of the band. The band's name was suggested by a female friend of Mori's after he told her he was "jamming with this Korean girl".

== History ==
They released a demo cassette shortly after forming in March 1996. They released one CD (Korea Girl in 1997; re-released in 1999 with additional bonus tracks) and one 7" (Reunion in 1997) on Asian Man Records, and they appeared on various Asian Man compilations. Korea Girl was declared Album of the Year in 1997 by Santa Clara University radio station KSCU. The album was re-released again in 2023 by Los Angeles indie label 7th Heaven. The group received a Bammie (Bay Area Music Award) nomination in 1997 for Outstanding Independent Album. In 1999, Korea Girl disbanded following increasing tension between Mori and Yi, culminating in Mori's departure shortly before the group's disbandment. Mori would later form Ee.

In 2025, the band achieved significant mainstream recognition after their song "Reunion", released in 1997, became popular on the short-form video platform TikTok. Mori would go onto say that their resurgence was "insane and really gratifying". In February 2026 they released the Reunion Rawk EP, followed by their first single since their 1997 album with "Anthropocene" on May 1, 2026, accredited to both Yi and Mori.

== Artistry ==
Korea Girl's music was described as a indie rock, indie pop, slacker rock, and twee pop band, featuring both male and female vocals and using clean and undistorted guitars in the manner of such earlier indie rock groups as Blake Babies. Mori describes being inspired by Pavement's "Slanted and Enchanted" during the recording process. A 1999 review for In Music We Trust called it "sweet indie-pop that also contains enough energy to wrestle with the rockers, while never losing any sincerity or emotions contained in the soft moments [...] It is sweet, innocent, and very gentle, without being too soft".

== Band members ==
Principal lineup

- Elizabeth Yi – vocals, guitars (1996–1999, 2026)
- Tobin Mori – vocals, guitars, keyboards (1996–1999,2026)
- Summer Farnese – bass guitar (1996–1997)
- Marc Duarte – drums, percussion (1996–1997)

Other members

- Jennifer Yee – bass guitar (1997–1999)
- Scott Landucci – drums, percussion (1997–1999)
- Jamie Stewart – bass guitar

Touring members

- Che Chou – bass guitar

== Discography ==
- Korea Girl (demo tape) (1996, Korean Muzaac)
- "Reunion" / "Launched" (1997, Asian Man Records)
- Korea Girl (album) (1997, Not Happy Records)
- The Complete Discography (2000, Asian Man Records Japan)
- "Jessie's Girl" (2025, Cagey Monkey Music)
- Reunion Rawk (2026)
- "Anthropocene" (2026)

=== Compilation appearances ===
- "Reunion" on Mailorder is Fun! (1998, Asian Man)
- "B-Side" on Mailorder is Still Fun!! (1999, Asian Man)
- "Under the Sun" on 2001 Asian Man Sampler (2001)
- "Reunion" (music video) on 10 Minutes to Ogikubo Station (Asian Man)
- "Peon" on Mailorder is Fun in Europe (2002, Asian Man/Leech)
- "Peon" on Mailorder for the Masses (2002, Asian Man)
- "Launched" on A Taste of Heaven: Summer 2023 (2023, 7th Heaven)
- "Serpentine" on Heaven Sent: Summer 2024 (2024, 7th Heaven)
- "Reunion (demo)" on For Heaven's Sake: Summer 2025 (2025, 7th Heaven)
- "Reunion" on YOJIMBO: A Benefit for RASAC (MoonRip Tapes)
