= Ali Gaye =

Gambian-American football player (born 1998)

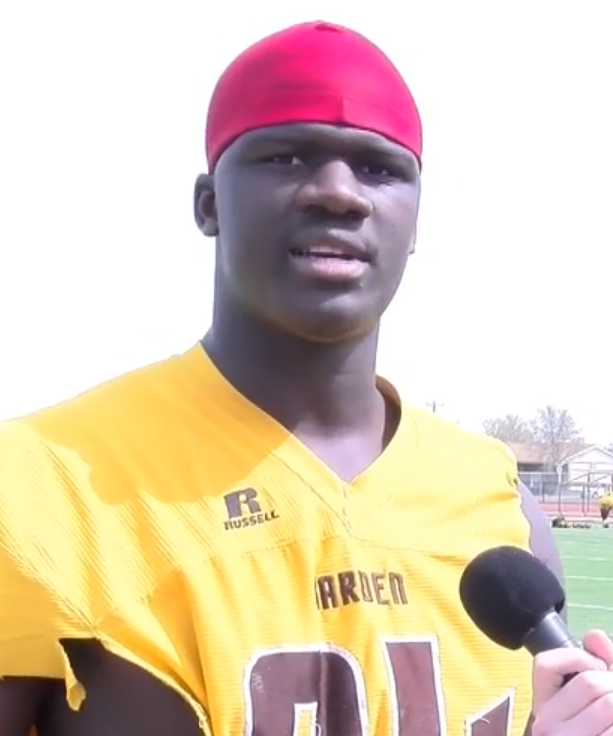
- Gaye with the Garden City Broncbusters in 2019

No. 95 – Houston Texans
- Position: Defensive end
- Roster status: Injured reserve

Personal information
- Born: November 29, 1998 (age 27); The Gambia
- Listed height: 6 ft 6 in (1.98 m)
- Listed weight: 265 lb (120 kg)

Career information
- High school: Edmonds Woodway (Edmonds, Washington, U.S.)
- College: Arizona Western (2018); Garden City CC (2019); LSU (2020–2022)
- NFL draft: 2023: undrafted

Career history
- Houston Texans (2023–2024)*; Tennessee Titans (2024–2025); Houston Texans (2026–present)
- * Offseason or practice squad member only

Awards and highlights
- Second-team All-SEC (2020)

Career NFL statistics as of 2025
- Total tackles: 9
- Sacks: 1
- Stats at Pro Football Reference

Ali Gaye (born November 29, 1998) is a Gambian professional American football defensive end for the Houston Texans of the National Football League (NFL). He played college football for the LSU Tigers.

== Early life ==
Gaye was born in The Gambia and immigrated to the United States with his family when he was 12, settling in Everett, Washington. Although he was initially a soccer player in his youth, Gaye later began playing American football in eighth grade at the age of 14. He attended Edmonds Woodway High School and was named All-Wesco 3A/2A in each of his final three seasons. Gaye was rated a three-star recruit and initially signed a letter of intent to play college football at the University of Washington and grayshirt his freshman season over offers from USC, Arizona, California and Mississippi. He ultimately was not accepted by the university due to failing to meet the school's SAT requirement.

== College career ==
Gaye began his collegiate career at Arizona Western College. He transferred to Garden City Community College in Garden City, Kansas before his sophomore year after Arizona Western disbanded their football team. Gaye was named to the first team All-Jayhawk League after finishing the season with 44 tackles, 7.5 tackles for a loss, one sack, one forced fumble and two blocked kicks. Gaye committed to transfer to LSU for his final two seasons of eligibility over offers from Oklahoma and Nebraska.

Gaye was named a starter at defensive end for the Tigers. In his first game with the team, he recorded three tackles with two tackles for loss and a sack while also having a team-high three passes defended. Gaye finished the season with 32 tackles, 9.5 tackles for a loss, two sacks and six passes defended and was named second team All-Southeastern Conference.

== Professional career ==
Pre-draft measurables
| Height | Weight | Arm length | Hand span | Wingspan | Bench press |
|---|---|---|---|---|---|
| 6 ft 6 in (1.98 m) | 263 lb (119 kg) | 34 1/4 in (0.87 m) | 9 1/2 in (0.24 m) | 6 ft 8 1/8 in (2.04 m) | 19 reps |
All values from NFL Combine/Pro Day

=== Houston Texans (first stint) ===
Gaye was signed by the Houston Texans as an undrafted free agent on May 12, 2023. He was waived by Houston on August 29, and was re-signed to the team's practice squad. Gaye signed a reserve/future contract with the Texans on January 22, 2024. He was waived by Houston on August 27.

=== Tennessee Titans ===
Gaye was claimed off waivers by the Tennessee Titans on August 28, 2024, and made the team's final roster as a rotational outside linebacker for the 2024 season. Gaye made his professional debut on special teams during Week 2's game against the New York Jets. He made his first career sack against C. J. Stroud during a Week 12 road win against the Houston Texans. He played 15 games during the 2024 season, finishing his rookie year with eight tackles (seven solo).

On August 26, 2025, Gaye was waived by the Titans as part of final roster cuts and re-signed to the practice squad the next day. On October 14, he was promoted to the active roster. On October 28, Gaye was placed on injured reserve due to a knee injury suffered in Week 8 against the Indianapolis Colts. He was activated on January 3, 2026, ahead of the team's season finale against the Jacksonville Jaguars.

On April 30, 2026, Gaye was waived by the Titans.

=== Houston Texans (second stint) ===
On May 1, 2026, Gaye was claimed off of waivers by the Houston Texans. He was placed on season–ending injured reserve on August 30 due to a major knee injury suffered during a joint practice with the Carolina Panthers.
