= Are You Driving Me Crazy? =

Studio album by Seam
- Released: June 20, 1995
- Recorded: January 1995
- Studio: Idful, Chicago, Illinois
- Genre: Indie rock, slowcore, emocore
- Length: 43:00
- Label: Touch and Go
- Producer: Brad Wood and Casey Rice

Seam chronology
The Problem with Me (1993)	Are You Driving Me Crazy? (1995)	The Pace Is Glacial (1998)

Professional ratings
Review scores
Source	Rating
AllMusic	3/5 stars
Charlotte Observer	3.5/4 stars

Are You Driving Me Crazy? is the third album by American indie rock band Seam. It was released in 1995 through Touch and Go Records. The band promoted the album by touring with aMiniature and Versus.

== Production ==
The album was primarily produced by Brad Wood.

== Critical reception ==
The Chicago Reader called the album "a bleak statement of emotional strain embodied by guitars that mewl with melancholy, bitterness, and unsure resolve." The Chicago Tribune noted that "the edgy guitar textures overlap with the understated melancholy in [Sooyoung] Park's voice and lyrics, a reflection of a tumultuous year that ended with a pressure-packed recording schedule." The Gazette stated: "Nothing new to this kind of ache-based grandeur, but Seam's languorous guitar noise serves its songs, and not the other way around."

Kenneth Johnson of the Charlotte Observer in a 3.5/4 stars review remarked, "That this Chicago by-the-way-of-Chapel Hill band is back in action is enough to rejoice. That it's managed to match the crystalline beauty of its gorgeous CD "The Problem With Me" is an enormous bonus..."Are You Driving Me Crazy" is a triumphant and most welcome return."

== Track listing ==
All tracks are written by Seam.

No.	Title	Length
1.	"Berlitz"	3:14
2.	"Hey Latasha"	3:34
3.	"Port of Charleston"	5:59
4.	"Rainy Season"	3:13
5.	"Two Is Enough"	5:29
6.	"Haole Redux"	2:57
7.	"Tuff Luck"	5:20
8.	"Broken Bones"	3:48
9.	"Sometimes I Forget"	6:05
10.	"Petty Thievery"	3:26

== Personnel ==
Seam

- Chris Manfrin – drums
- Sooyoung Park – vocals, guitar
- Reg Schrader – guitar
- William Shin – bass guitar

Production and additional personnel

- Bundy K. Brown – EBow on "Port of Charleston" and "Haole Redux"
- Jeff Divine – photography
- Julie Liu – trumpet, violin and backing vocals on "Rainy Season" and "Tuff Luck"
- Casey Rice – recording on "Tuff Luck" and "Sometimes I Forget"
- Brad Wood – recording
