= Edmonds Heights K–12 =

Coordinates: 47°47′12″N 122°22′09″W

- Edmonds, Washington; United States

Information
- Type: Alternative School
- Established: 1996
- School district: Edmonds School District #15
- Principal: Casey Campbell
- Faculty: 26 (2024-25)
- Grades: K–12
- Enrollment: 614 (2024-25)
- Campus type: Suburban
- Website: https://eheights.edmonds.wednet.edu/

Edmonds Heights K–12, formerly Edmonds Homeschool Resource Center, is a parent-school partnership program which supports parents who choose to be the primary educators of their children. The school provides shared resources, classes, and support systems designed to facilitate learning at home and on campus. Edmonds Heights offers classes to children ranging from kindergarten age to 12th grade. The EHK12 campus is located in a large section of the former Woodway High School campus. It is open four days a week and runs on a semester schedule.

The school operates under the WAC 392-121-182 Alternative Learning Experience Requirements. Students and parents are required to submit monthly Progress Reports and develop a written student learning plan (WSLP) each month. Students are also expected to meet with certificated teachers at least monthly.
