= Star Booty =

EP by Bitch Magnet
- Released: 1988
- Recorded: January 6–8, 1988
- Studio: Conservatory Audio (Oberlin, Ohio)
- Genre: Post-hardcore
- Length: 24:06
- Label: Glitterhouse
- Producer: Steve Albini

Bitch Magnet chronology
Star Booty (1988)	Umber (1989)

Professional ratings
Review scores
Source	Rating
AllMusic	4/5 stars

Star Booty an EP mini-album by the American post-hardcore band Bitch Magnet. The record documents the band's early line-up, and was one of the first records produced by Steve Albini after he ended his group Big Black.

== Release ==
Star Booty was first released independently in 1988. It was paired with the band's debut full-length album and re-issued by Communion the following year. In 2011 Star Booty was remastered by Alan Douches and released in a box-set with the rest of the band's catalog.

== Track listing ==
All songs written by Bitch Magnet

Side one
No.	Title	Length
1.	"Carnation"	3:06
2.	"Chord"	2:29
3.	"Sea of Pearls"	3:40
4.	"Hatpins"	1:47

Side two
No.	Title	Length
1.	"Knucklehead"	3:01
2.	"Circle K"	3:23
3.	"Polio"	2:31
4.	"Cantaloupe (live)"	4:09

== Personnel ==
Bitch Magnet

- Orestes Delatorre – drums
- Jon Fine – guitar
- Sooyoung Park – bass guitar, vocals

Additional musicians and production

- Mark Bousek and Pete Smith – recording
- Steve Albini – production
- Günter Pauler – mastering
