= Slow Motion Crash =

American indie rock band

Background information
- Origin: Atlanta, Georgia
- Genres: Alternative rock, indie rock
- Years active: 2006–Present
- Labels: Unsigned
- Members: Brian Fisher; Ryan Holmes; Melissa Giorgio; Alec Irvin; Joshua Broughton
- Past members: Emily Beard (2006-2007)
- Website: slowmotioncrash.com

Slow Motion Crash are an American indie rock band. Formed by former members of Creve Coeur in 2006, the band released their debut album in May 2007. Band members include Brian Fisher (vocals/guitar), Ryan Holmes (guitar/vocals), Melissa Giorgio (bass), Alec Irvin (drums) and Joshua Broughton (keys).

== Musical style ==
Named after a state of constant musical collision, Slow Motion Crash combines big bass distortion bottoms, precise drumming, electronic experimentation and tight, melodic guitar riffs to define their signature sound.

Built on foundations of 80's post-punk and new wave, Slow Motion Crash has created an accessible alternative styling. The spiky keyboard riff that laces through "5th and Incident," the insistent drums and dissonant guitar clash of "Trail of Tears," the quirky push and pull of "Mirrors & Conflict" — these moments nod to the joys of your older brother's crates of old Love and Rockets and Fugazi records while creating a melancholic tension that rings just as true in the here and now.

== Press ==
"(The members of) Atlanta's Slow Motion Crash have logged some serious time in the shadowy corners of this music, incorporating the anxious atmospherics into a sound that invites comparisons to other bands without slavishly imitating any of them." - Kevin Forest Moreau, Sunday Paper

"These local boys and girls sure do play some gothically ethereal (or ethereally gothic?) shit. Joy Division and Interpol comparisons are inevitable. Thankfully, they do put their heart into it, resulting in some ass-shaking jams and dark lyrics that actually sound convincing." - Mark Sanders, Creative Loafing (Atlanta)

== Discography ==
- Slow Motion Crash
  (May 25, 2007)
  SMC-0126
  616822047323

== Notable live performances ==
- August 14, 2007 at The Masquerade, Atlanta, Georgia with Birthday Massacre and TheStart
- June 22, 2007 at The Drunken Unicorn, Atlanta, Georgia with The Dark Romantics and Tentonic
- April 29, 2007 at Lenny's, Atlanta, Georgia CD Release Party with The Atlanta Rollergirls
- December 14, 2006 at The Earl, Atlanta, Georgia with Snowden and ¡Forward, Russia!
- October 29, 2006 at Voodoo Music Festival, New Orleans, Louisiana
