= Sol Patches =

American rapper

Sol Cabrini, also known by her stage name Sol Patches is a Chicago actor, poet, scholar, author, and rapper who uses they/she pronouns. They began their career in Chicago's theater and poetry scene, and released their first mixtape As2Water Hurricanes at the end of June 2016 on SoundCloud.

Sol was born and raised in Chicago. She is heavily influenced by Chicago's queer Latino and black femme culture through her theater and poetry involvement and is a PhD Candidate in performance studies at New York University. They appeared in the 2016 production of the play Kill Floor at the American Theater Company in Chicago.

On March 18, 2023, Sol released their first album, Ordinary Delusions, on Bandcamp. The following year she published her debut poetry collection, Tgirl.jpg with Roof Books an imprint of Segue Foundation.

== Discography ==
- Ordinary Delusions (2023)
