= Ben Hur (album) =

- Vinyl cover. The CD covers contains a black box with white text on top of the cover stating the artist and album's name.

Studio album by Bitch Magnet
- Released: 1990
- Recorded: May–July 14, 1990
- Studios: Chicago Recording Company (Chicago, Illinois); Studios at Soundscape (New York City)
- Genres: Post-hardcore, noise rock
- Length: 33:45
- Label: Glitterhouse Records

Bitch Magnet chronology
Umber (1989)	Ben Hur (1990)	Bitch Magnet (2011)

Ben Hur is the second full-length and final album released by the American post-hardcore band Bitch Magnet. It was recorded after the departure of Bitch Magnet's added guitarist, David Gait, and features an appearance by the band's occasional guitarist, David Grubbs. Five tracks from Ben Hur were recorded by Steve Albini, who is credited under the pseudonym Arden Geist. The remaining tracks were recorded respectively by Mike McMackin and Louisville, Kentucky producer Howie Gano, who had engineered albums by Grubbs' previous band, Squirrel Bait.

== Release and reception ==
Professional ratings
Review scores
Source	Rating
Allmusic	4/5 stars

Ben Hur was first released in 1990 by Glitterhouse Records. First issue of release came with a bonus 7" that contains the songs Sadie and Where Eagles Fly. In 2011, it was remastered by Alan Douches and released in a box-set containing with the rest of the band's catalog.

== Track listing ==
All songs written by Bitch Magnet

No.	Title	Length
1.	"Dragoon"	9:30
2.	"Valmead"	3:34
3.	"Ducks and Drakes"	4:32
4.	"Mesentery"	2:34
5.	"Lookin' at the Devil"	3:37
6.	"Gator"	2:11
7.	"Spite y Malice"	3:07
8.	"Crescent"	4:40

== Personnel ==
Bitch Magnet

- Orestes Delatorre – drums
- Jon Fine – guitar
- Sooyoung Park – bass guitar, vocals

Additional musicians and production

- David Grubbs – guitar on "Valmead"
- Howie Gano – recording
- Arden Geist – recording
- Mike McMackin – mastering, recording
