= Jeff Mickel =

American football player (born 1966)

No. 77, 73
- Position: Offensive tackle

Personal information
- Born: August 4, 1966 (age 60); Limestone, Maine, U.S.
- Listed height: 6 ft 6 in (1.98 m)
- Listed weight: 300 lb (136 kg)

Career information
- High school: Edmonds Woodway (Edmonds, Washington)
- College: Eastern Washington
- NFL draft: 1989: 6th round, 163rd overall pick

Career history
- Minnesota Vikings (1989)*; Denver Broncos (1989)*; Los Angeles Rams (1990); Barcelona Dragons (1991); Frankfurt Galaxy (1992)
- * Offseason or practice squad member only

Career NFL statistics
- Games played: 1
- Stats at Pro Football Reference

Arthur Jeffery Mickel (born August 4, 1966) is an American former professional football player who was an offensive lineman in the National Football League (NFL). He played college football for the Eastern Washington Eagles and was selected in the sixth round by the Minnesota Vikings in the 1989 NFL draft. He made his NFL debut for the Los Angeles Rams in 1990. He later played in the World League (WLAF) for the Barcelona Dragons and Frankfurt Galaxy.
