= Bill Doerrfeld =

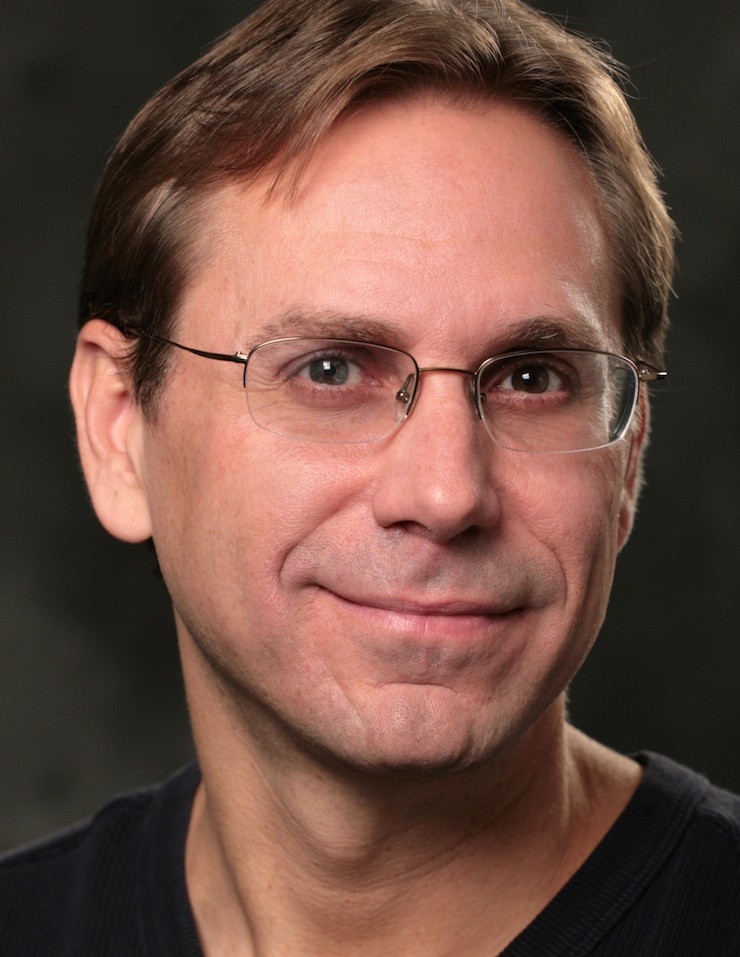
- Bill Doerrfeld in 2007

Background information
- Born: April 3, 1964 (age 62); Chicago, Illinois, US
- Genres: Jazz, classical, jazz fusion
- Occupations: Musician, pianist, composer
- Instrument: Piano
- Years active: 1977–present
- Website: billdoerrfeld.com

William Doerrfeld (born April 3, 1964) is an American classical and jazz pianist and composer.

His primary focus is on compositions for classical symphonic orchestra, classical and jazz solo piano, and his fusion piano trio. In October 2014, Doerrfeld started the Doerrfeld Trio.

== Biography ==
=== Youth ===
Doerrfeld started playing piano at the age of 4. At the age of 14, Yamaha invited him to perform his solo jazz piano work "Unidentified Flying Fingers" at the Togo no Sato Interior Hall in Japan as part of their 7th Junior Original Concert in 1978. He received a BMI Student Composer Award, a New York Youth Symphony commission and Carnegie Hall orchestral premiere performance.

=== Education and performances ===
Doerrfeld earned degrees in classical piano and composition from Eastman School of Music, and Yale School of Music.

Doerrfeld's compositions have been performed by the Baltimore Symphony Orchestra, Saint Petersburg State Symphony Orchestra, and Lamont Symphony. He has been a featured guest of the Northwest Sinfonietta and the Methow Music Festival. His piano compositions have been performed by Ralph Votapek.

On November 16, 2010, Doerrfeld released his debut album titled Time and Again followed by A Passing Moment and Flurious.

=== Awards and honors ===
Doerrfeld received awards from Banff Centre, MacDowell Artist Colony, Tanglewood, and Yaddo.

== Discography ==
- Time and Again (Jassical, 2010)
- A Passing Moment (Jassical, 2011)
- Flurious (Jassical, 2012)
