= Cobalt & the Hired Guns =

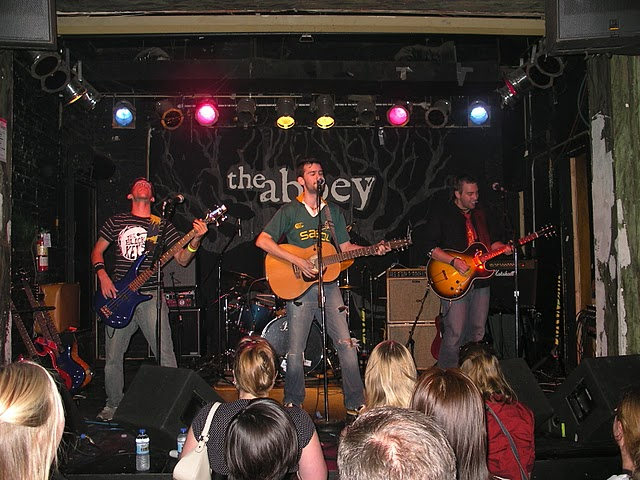
- Cobalt & the Hired Guns performing at the Abbey Pub, Chicago, October 2007

Background information
- Also known as: Cobalt, CATHG
- Origin: Chicago and Oberlin College
- Genres: Americana, Pop punk, Rock
- Years active: 2003 – 2016
- Past members: Matt Hart (vocals, guitar, bass); Tomlinson Fort (vocals, guitar, bass); Jesse Alexander (drums, vocals, percussion); Mike Roth (bass, guitar, vocals); Larry Bailey (bass, vocals (live); Amanda Raber (saxophone)
- Website: www.cobaltandthehiredguns.com

Cobalt & the Hired Guns was an Americana-punk pop-rock band based in Chicago. They have been interviewed in The Deli Magazine, where they were named Chicago's Artist(s) of the Month. In May 2009, they were finalists for MetroMix's Rock 'n' Vote competition, but first place went to another local band, I Fight Dragons. Other online reviews include The Brooklyn Paper's video review, and Jersey Beat.

== History ==
Matt Hart and Tomlinson Fort are the founding members of CATHG, and members Mike Roth and Jesse Alexander joined soon after the band's inception in 2003 at Oberlin College in Ohio. The band members graduated from Oberlin in 2006, and headed back to Chicago, where Matt and Tomilnson grew up. The band released their first carbon neutral album in 2008, Jump the Fence.

On April 18, 2010, the band announced on their blog Matt Hart’s departure, though he would return for certain songs on their upcoming album and certain live appearances. The same blog post introduced Amanda Raber as a new member.

In January 2012, the band created a Kickstarter campaign to help fund the recording of their newest album, Everybody Wins, which raised $8,000. Fans that donated money to the campaign chose from prize options such as receiving mix CDs, having the band play a show in the fan's hometown, and becoming an "Honorary Hired Gun" and being named on the album. Everybody Wins! was released June 12, 2012.

The band’s final live performance occurred on May 25, 2016, at Lincoln Hall in Chicago, Illinois, appearing alongside Otter Finn supporting headliner act In Threes.

A post on the band’s Facebook page on November 12, 2023, confirmed their status as disbanded.

== Discography ==
- Jump the Fence, 2008
- The Double Single, 2009
- Everybody Wins!, June 2012

== Chicago Roots Collective ==
CATHG is a founding member of the Chicago Roots Collective, a consortium of 10 local Chicago bands working together to promote each other's music. The idea to form the collective came about in the fall of 2008 at the Chicago Bluegrass and Blues Festival.
