= Sooyoung Park =

American musician

- Also known as: Panther Lau
- Born: 1967 (age 58–59); North Tonawanda, New York, U.S.
- Genres: Indie rock, post-hardcore, slowcore
- Occupation: Musician
- Instruments: Vocals, guitar, bass guitar
- Years active: 1986–present
- Label: Touch and Go Records

Sooyoung Park (born 1967) is an American singer-songwriter, best known for fronting the bands Bitch Magnet and Seam. In 1995 he co-founded Foundation of Asian American Independent Media, an art festival dedicated to showcasing Asian American culture.

== Early life ==
Sooyoung Park was born in 1967 in upstate New York, and grew up in West Virginia and North Carolina. He graduated from Oberlin College, where he was a founding member of the band Bitch Magnet.

== Discography ==
=== Bitch Magnet ===
- Star Booty (1988, Glitterhouse)
- Umber (1989, Glitterhouse)
- Ben Hur (1990, Glitterhouse)

=== Seam ===
- Headsparks (1991, Homestead Records)
- The Problem With Me (1993, Touch and Go Records)
- Are You Driving Me Crazy? (1995, Touch and Go Records)
- The Pace Is Glacial (1998, Touch and Go Records)

=== Shady ===
"Narcotic Candy" single (1994, Beggars Banquet)

=== Ee ===
- For 100 We Try Harder (2002, Asian Man Records)

=== Codeine ===
- Frigid Stars LP (expanded re-issue 2012, Numero Group)

=== Bored Spies ===
- Summer 720 7" single (2013, Damnably)
