= Bitch Magnet =

American rock band

- Origin: Oberlin, Ohio, U.S.
- Genres: Post-hardcore, noise rock
- Years active: 1986–1991, 2011–2012
- Labels: Communion, Shigaku/What Goes On, Glitterhouse, Waterfront, Caff
- Past members: Sooyoung Park; Jon Fine; Jay Oelbaum; Orestes Morfín; David Grubbs; David Galt; Pete Pollack

Bitch Magnet was an American post-hardcore band that formed in 1986 at Oberlin College in Ohio and later moved to North Carolina.

== History ==
Bitch Magnet released their first record in 1988. All of the band's albums were released on Communion Records in the US. They were also signed to European labels Shigaku/What Goes On and Glitterhouse. The band disbanded in 1991.

On March 31, 2011, Bitch Magnet announced that the lineup of Fine, Morfin and Park (the band's original lineup) would reunite to perform at the All Tomorrow's Parties festival "Nightmare Before Christmas" in the UK in December 2011. In addition to performing at ATP, the band played shows in London, Brussels, Cologne and in the Netherlands at Groningen's Vera club. The band played its first reunion shows in Asia in November 2011, in Seoul and Tokyo. In the spring of 2012, Bitch Magnet played additional shows in Tokyo, Singapore, Hong Kong, and Manila. It concluded its reunion with a tour of America in autumn, 2012, performing in Seattle, San Francisco, two shows in New York, and its final show in Chicago, at the Empty Bottle.

Bitch Magnet's three albums were reissued on December 6, 2011, by Temporary Residence Limited, as a deluxe limited-edition triple-LP set and as a triple CD. The reissues included non-LP tracks and previously unreleased recordings that were remixed with John Congleton in late 2010.

== Musical style ==
Steve Huey of AllMusic described Bitch Magnet's sound as a "blistering and intellectual brand of post-hardcore punk." They have drawn comparisons to Big Black. They have also drawn comparisons to Slint, though they have been described as "more relentless and somewhat less nuanced."

== Members ==
=== Final lineup ===
- Sooyoung Park – vocals, bass (1986–1990, 2011–2012)
- Jon Fine – guitar (1986–1990, 2011–2012)
- Orestes Morfín (aka Orestes Delatorre) – drums (1987–1990, 2011–2012)

=== Former members ===
- Jay Oelbaum – drums (1986)
- David Grubbs – guitar (1989)
- David Galt – guitar (1989)
- Pete Pollack – drums (1990)

== Discography ==
=== Albums ===
- Umber (1989)
- Ben Hur (1990)
- Bitch Magnet (2011)

=== EPs and singles ===
- Star Booty (1988)
- "Valmead" b/w "Pea" – split with Codeine (1990, Glitterhouse also released as 12" with live versions of "Big Pining" and "Navajo Ace")
- "Mesentery" & "Motor" b/w "Big Pining (alternate version)" (1990, Waterfront)
- "Sadie" b/w "Where Eagles Fly" (cover of Misfits song "Where Eagles Dare") included in limited release of Ben Hur LP (1990)
- "Sadie" b/w "Ducks and Drakes (live)" (1991, Caff Records)

=== Compilations ===
- Endangered Species, a 6 record box set compilation of 7" singles, released by Glitterhouse,1991, contains one track by Bitch Magnet: "White Piece of Bread" (alternate side with Bullet LaVolta's "Hello There")
- Bitch Magnet, a triple-CD set containing Ben Hur with "White Piece of Bread" and "Sadie", Umber with "Motor (alternate mix)", and Star Booty with alternate versions of "Sadie" and four other Umber songs. Also released as a triple-LP set. (Temporary Residence Limited, 2011)

=== Music videos ===
- "Mesentery" (1990)
