= Seam (band) =

American indie rock band

- Origin: Chapel Hill, North Carolina, United States
- Genres: Indie rock; post-hardcore; slowcore; emocore
- Years active: 1991–2000
- Labels: Homestead; Merge; Touch and Go; Ché; Ajax
- Spinoffs: Bottomless Pit
- Spinoff of: Bitch Magnet
- Past members: Sooyoung Park; Craig White; Reg Shrader; John Lee; Lexi Mitchell; William Shin; Mac McCaughan; Bob Rising; Chris Manfrin
- Website: Touch and Go

Seam was an American indie rock band formed in Chapel Hill, North Carolina and based in Chicago, Illinois. Active from 1991 to 2000, it was led by principal songwriter, vocalist, guitarist, and sole continuous member Sooyoung Park, former frontman of Bitch Magnet. Seam's initial line-up included bassist Lexi Mitchell and drummer Mac McCaughan.

Seam's style is characterized by "slow, affecting melodies and vocals." The band's music is considered influential on "legions of emo and college rock acts."

== History ==
The band signed to Homestead Records in the United States and City Slang in Europe, and released debut album Headsparks in 1992, the same year the band relocated to Chicago. In 1993 they left Homestead for Touch and Go Records, releasing the "Kernel" single before McCaughan left to be replaced by Bob Rising, with Craig White also joining on guitar. This line-up recorded the band's second album, The Problem with Me in 1993. The band returned in 1995 with the album Are You Driving Me Crazy?, with Park now joined by a new line-up of Reg Shrader (guitar), William Shin (bass guitar), and Chris Manfrin (drums). The band's final album, The Pace Is Glacial, was released in 1998. Their last tour was in Seoul, South Korea, in 2000.

Drummer Chris Manfrin later played in the band Bottomless Pit, featuring two members from former labelmates Silkworm.

== Members ==
=== Final lineup ===
- Sooyoung Park – guitar, vocals (1991–2000)
- William Shin – bass (1994–2000)
- Chris Manfrin – drums (1993–2000)

=== Other members ===
- Craig White – guitar (1992–1993)
- Reg Shrader – guitar (1993–1998)
- John Lee – guitar (1999)
- Lexi Mitchell – bass (1991–1994)
- Mac McCaughan – drums (1991–1992)
- Bob Rising – drums (1992–1993)

== Discography ==
Studio albums

- Headsparks (1992, Homestead)
- The Problem with Me (1993, Touch and Go)
- Are You Driving Me Crazy? (1995, Touch and Go)
- The Pace Is Glacial (1998, Touch and Go)

EPs and singles

- "Days of Thunder" (1991, Homestead)
- "Granny 9X" (1992, Merge)
- Kernel (1993, Touch and Go)
- "Hey Latasha" (1995, Ché)
- "Sukiyaki" (1999, Ajax)
