= Mountlake Terrace High School =

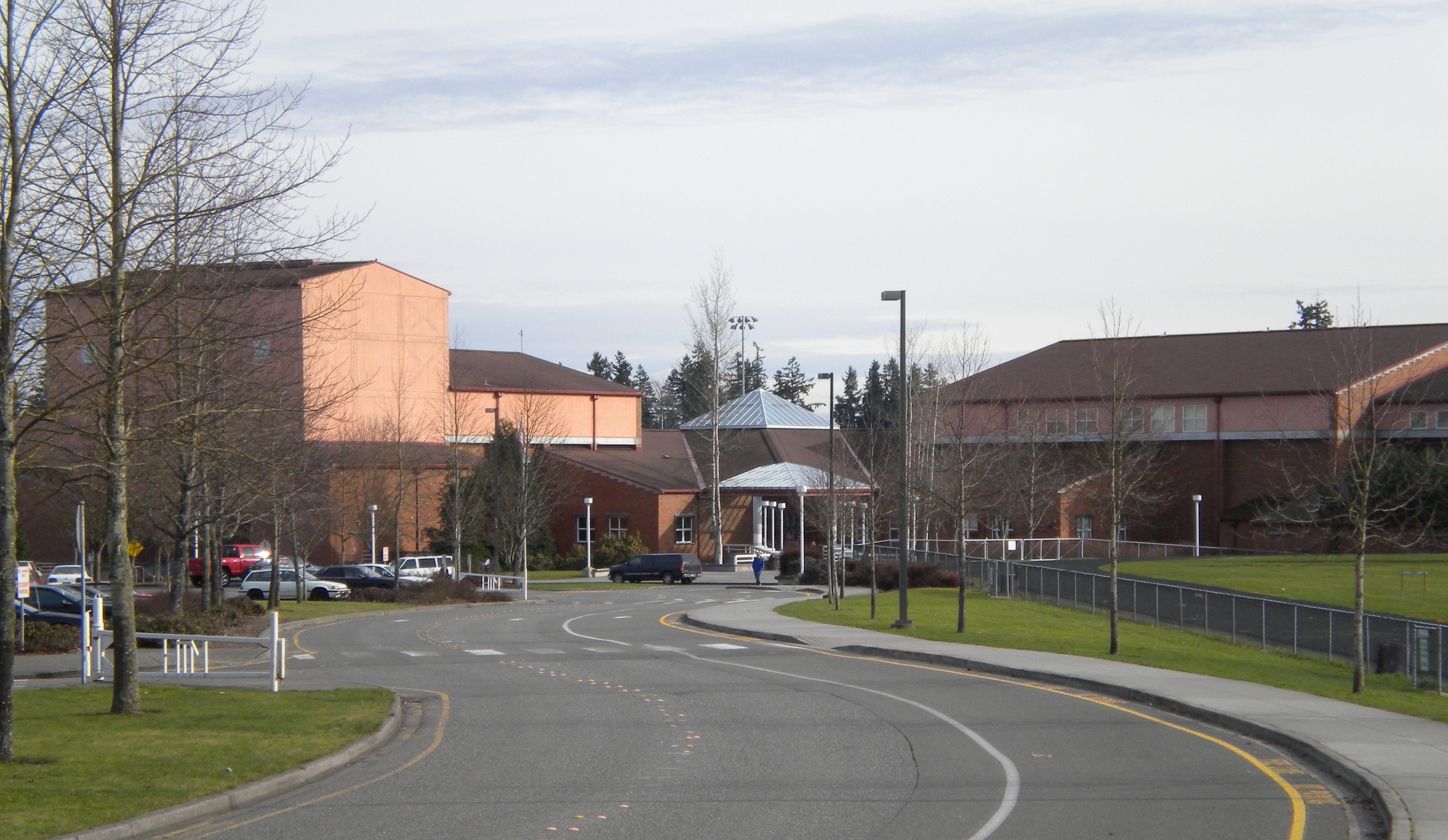

Location
- 21801 44th Avenue W Mountlake Terrace, Washington 98403; United States; 47°48′06″N 122°17′17″W

Information
- Type: Public secondary school
- Motto: To be, not to seem
- Established: 1960 (rebuilt in 1991, minor renovations in 2012)
- School district: Edmonds School District
- Principal: David Friedle
- Staff: 61.74(FTE)
- Grades: 9–12
- Enrollment: 1,385 (2023–2024)
- Student to teacher ratio: 22.43
- Campus size: Medium
- Campus type: Suburban
- Colors: Silver, Scarlet, Black & White
- Mascot: Hawks
- Newspaper: The Hawkeye
- Website: Mountlake Terrace High School

Mountlake Terrace High School is a public high school located in Mountlake Terrace, Washington, United States. Mountlake Terrace HS is known for its Jazz Band and basketball program, which has won the Wesco Championship eight times. It is the third largest high school in the Edmonds School District. Mountlake Terrace HS participates in the Washington Interscholastic Activities Association, having reclassified from 3A to 2A at the start of 2016–2017 school year.

== Academics ==
=== STEM education ===
Mountlake Terrace is a registered Project Lead the Way magnet school. This national program aims to educate middle and high schoolers in STEM curriculum. The school offers engineering and robotics classes for college and university level credit if an AP exam is taken. The school offers college-level engineering classes that offer college credit through the College in the High School program at local Edmonds Community College. The school also offers several Advanced Placement classes.

=== "Small schools" initiative ===
In September 2003 the school reorganized under five "small schools," each with a specific emphasis: the Terrace Academy of Arts and Sciences; the Discovery School; the Innovation School; the Renaissance School; and the Achievement, Opportunity and Scholarship School. The school received a $833,000 grant in return for their participation. The effort was met with mixed reactions. Students were to stay in a school until their junior year, or to file a petition with a school administrator to transfer between programs. The "small schools" program ended in 2008, after which MTHS returned to a traditional high school format.

== Activities ==
=== Journalism ===
The Mountlake Terrace High School journalism Program, Hawk Student Media, is a nationally award-winning student-led program that regularly publishes four separate publications. These include The Hawkeye newspaper, The corresponding news website www.thehawkeye.org, the TEMPO yearbook, and the Esoteros literary magazine which is ran and published by the school's creative writing club. The Hawkeye Newspaper and Website are ran by a new yearly set of student appointed editors-in-chief, along with the rest of the student leadership team. The Newspaper and website have both been nationally recognized multiple times since they were established in 1960, placing both in best of show at JEA/NSPA national conventions, winning several JEA Emerald Awards, and receiving the First Amendment Press Freedom Award a total of 16 times as of 2026, making them the school nationwide with the second most FAPFA awards received. Additionally the staff have won several personal awards at said conventions for their own works and participations to the publications, such as David Cardwell in 2026 winning the #1 spot nationwide for Best of Show News Feature Photography. The TEMPO Yearbook is run under the same staff as the Hawkeye Newspaper, after they took over the Yearbook in 2017. This publication is also run by a student appointed staff, and each year chooses a new innovative theme to base the TEMPO off of.

=== Theater department ===
The Mountlake Terrace Theatre Department is recognized at the, regional, state, and national levels.

=== Music program ===
There are two concert bands and two jazz bands, as well as a percussion ensemble, one choir, and two orchestras. The upper-level concert band, Chamber Winds, is a regular attendee at music festivals such as the University of Washington Music Festival and Central Washington University's music festival. They also toured Europe in 2008. The school's upper jazz band, Jazz 1, has attended Jazz at Lincoln Center's Essentially Ellington Jazz Festival and Competition in New York in 2000, 2002, 2005, 2008, 2011, 2012, 2017, 2018 and 2020; they placed third in the competition in 2005 and in 2011. They also received an honorable mention in 2002. The jazz band has gone on several European tours. The top jazz choir, Dynamics, was a winner of the Lionel Hampton Jazz Festival in Idaho in 2007, the third win in a row for the choir.

=== FRC ===
The school hosts FIRST Robotics Competition (FRC) team "Chill Out". The team was founded in 2006, and participated in FRC every year except 2021 due to the COVID-19 pandemic. Chill Out participated in the FIRST Robotics World Championships in 2006, 2012, 2017, 2018, 2024 and 2025 coincidentally FRC has been hosted in Houston, Texas 2 years in a row.

=== TSA ===
The Technology Student Association (TSA) club at Mountlake Terrace HS boasts the former largest (title was lost in 2024-2025) high school chapter in the state of Washington. At the 2022 WTSA conference, the chapter won first place in Animatronics, Dragster Design, Technology Bowl, and Structural Design in a sweep.

=== Broadcast ===
The school's Broadcast program, Hawk Broadcasting Network, was dissolved in 2025 due to lack of CTE support.

== Athletics ==
Mountlake Terrace competes in WIAA Class 3A and is a member of the Wesco League in District One.

=== State championships ===
- Boys basketball: 1977
- Boys soccer: 1975
- Girls soccer: 1987, 1988

== History and facilities ==
The high school opened on September 6, 1960, to serve the growing community of Mountlake Terrace, with an initial enrollment of 500 students. The existing school is a replacement facility constructed in 1991, designed by Bassetti Architects.

== Notable alumni ==
- Seamus Boxley, professional basketball player; played professionally overseas
- Ariana DeBoo, singer-songwriter, graduated in 2010
- Devante Downs, NFL linebacker for the Minnesota Vikings
- Lily Gladstone, actress, graduated in 2004.
- Thomas Ford, college football coach; head coach at the University of Idaho
- Mark O'Connor, fiddler (musician)
- Jake One, record producer and songwriter, graduated in 1994
- Ryan Strieby, professional baseball player; plays first base for the Camden Riversharks, a non-MLB-affiliated team
- Lil Mosey, rapper

== See also ==
- Edmonds School District
