= KSCU =

Radio station at Santa Clara University

- Santa Clara, California; United States
- Broadcast area: Santa Clara County, California
- Frequency: 103.3 MHz
- Branding: The Underground Sound

Programming
- Format: College

Ownership
- Owner: Santa Clara University

History
- First air date: 1948
- Former call signs: KVSC (1948–1952)
- Former frequencies: 880 kHz (1948–1953); 90.1 MHz (1953–1958); 870 kHz (1965); 89.1 MHz (1978–1982)

Technical information
- Licensing authority: FCC
- Facility ID: 59061
- Class: D
- ERP: 30 watts
- HAAT: −2 meters (−6.6 ft)
- Transmitter coordinates: 37°20′53″N 121°56′25″W

Links
- Public license information: Public file; LMS
- Webcast: Listen live
- Website: kscu.org

KSCU (103.3 FM) is a broadcast radio station in the United States. Licensed to Santa Clara, California, United States, KSCU is currently owned by Santa Clara University. Staffed by students at Santa Clara University, KSCU broadcasts a college format with music, public affairs, and sports.

== History ==
Prior to KSCU, Santa Clara University's first radio station was KVSC, broadcasting as a carrier current low-power station on 880 kHz and founded in 1948 as a project by Reverend Eugene M. Bacigalupi S.J., then head of the university physics department. KVSC played mostly classical music, popular music, and radio drama and was staffed by student volunteers. In 1952, KVSC changed its call sign to KSCU. Beginning in 1953, KSCU began broadcasting on FM at 90.1 MHz.

Due to a dispute with the FCC regarding license renewal, KSCU stopped broadcasting in December 1958.

Another KSCU station was founded in April 1965 as an AM station broadcasting on 870 kHz, its signal restricted by carrier current to the Dunne Hall dormitories. Programming at the time included music, news, sports, and academic lectures.

Then in May 1973, what was the University of Santa Clara founded an FM station KSCU, funded by a grant from the Associated Students of the University of Santa Clara with a transmitter donated by the Cotel Corporation. Following a burglary of over $700 worth of equipment in the mid-1970s, Panasonic donated replacement equipment so that KSCU could resume broadcasting. Twice, the Federal Communications Commission rejected KSCU's applications for a broadcast license in 1975 and 1976, the first application rejected due to student organizations being ineligible for a license and the second for technical reasons relating to frequency interference with other nearby stations. Eventually in 1977, the FCC issued a construction permit for KSCU to broadcast on 89.1 MHz with 10 watts of power, from a transmitter built on top of the Swig Residence Hall.

The FCC formally issued KSCU's present license on August 16, 1979. In 1980, the FCC issued a construction permit for KSCU to change frequency from 89.1 to 103.3 MHz. Beginning in September 1982, KSCU formally began broadcasting on 103.3.

When he attended middle school in San Jose in the early 1990s, rapper Traxamillion sometimes visited KSCU and performed freestyle raps live on the station, recounted the San Jose Mercury News in a 2006 profile.

Beginning in 1993, KSCU replaced 22 hours of jazz and eight hours of blues on its weekly schedule with alternative rock and hip hop, a move that San Jose Mercury News columnist Brad Kava said would put the station's playlist more in line with Stanford University station KZSU.

Previous KSCU logo from circa 2017 to 2022.

In 1996, KSCU won second place among college or independent radio stations in the Metro Silicon Valley annual readers' survey Best of Santa Clara Valley. In subsequent Metro surveys, KSCU won first place for Best College Radio Station in 1998 and Best Radio Station in 1999. But in 2000, campus newspaper The Santa Clara reported, "...most students living on campus do not listen to KSCU."

== Programming ==
With a tagline "The Underground Sound", KSCU is programmed by Santa Clara University students and managed by a faculty advisor. The station plays a wide range of independently released music such as alternative rock, soul, and jazz. KSCU also broadcasts public affairs programming targeted to the campus community and Santa Clara Broncos sports.

== Technical information ==
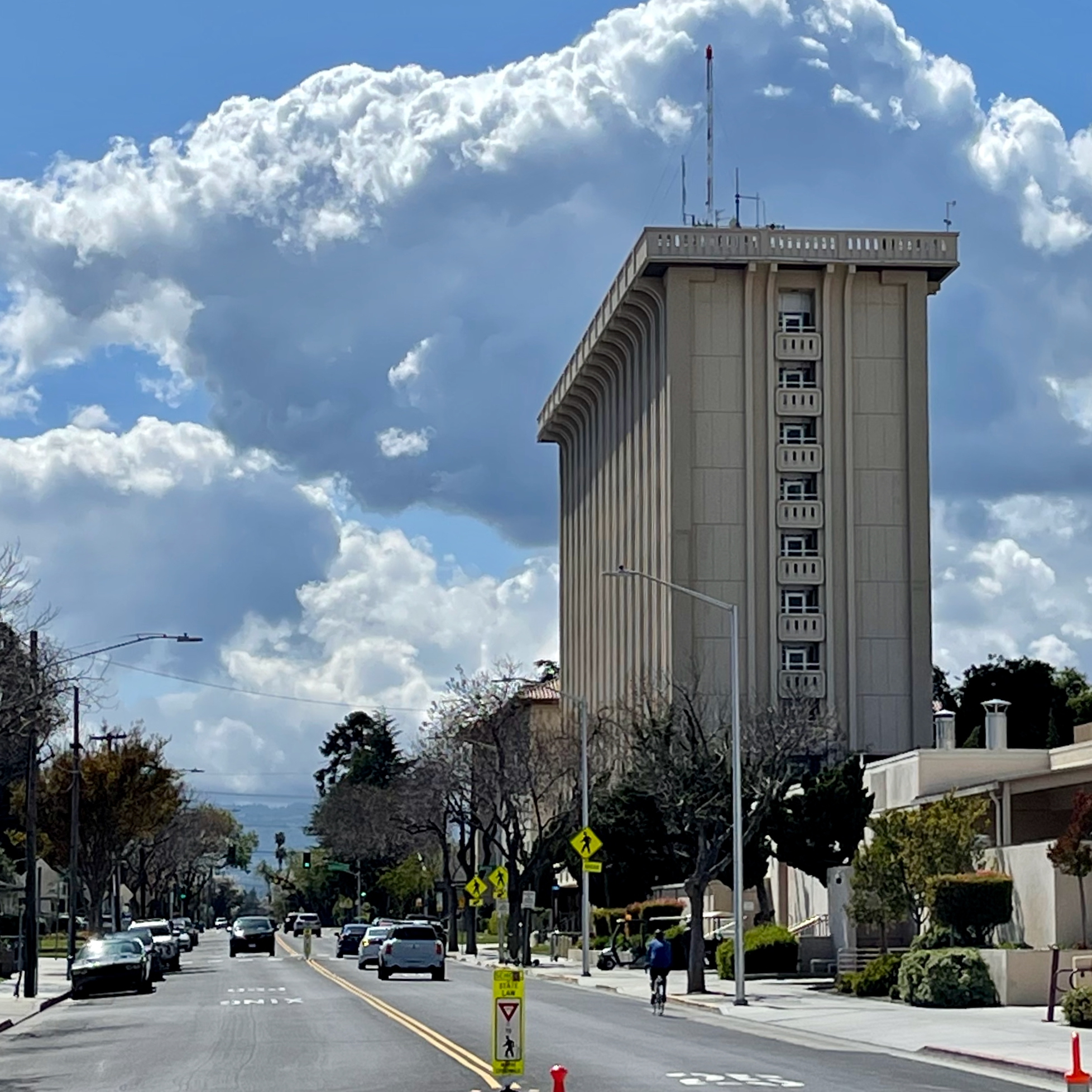
The KSCU transmitter on the roof of Swig Residence Hall at Santa Clara University.

KSCU broadcasts with 30 watts of effective radiated power from a transmitter atop Swig Residence Hall on the Santa Clara University campus. The studios of KSCU are located in the basement of the Robert F. Benson Memorial Center, a building next to Swig Hall.

== See also ==
- Campus radio
- List of college radio stations in the United States
