= Liz Phair discography =

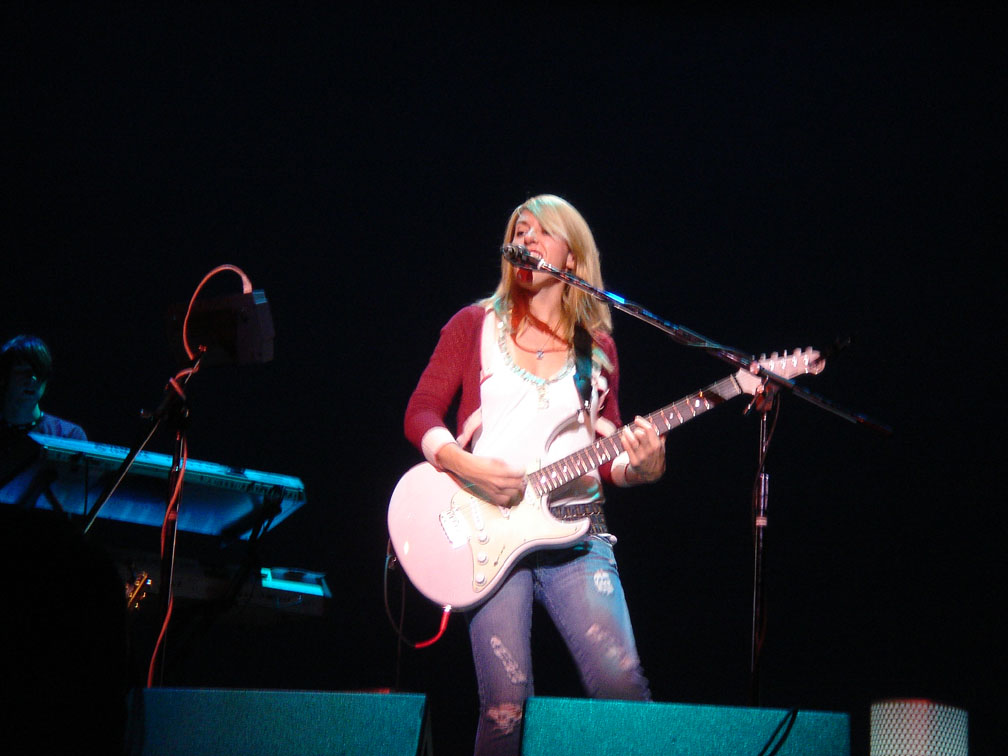
- Liz Phair performing live in 2005.
- Studio albums: 7
- Extended plays: 3
- Soundtrack albums: 6
- Compilation albums: 3
- Tribute albums: 1
- Singles: 17
- B-sides: 7
- Video albums: 2
- Music videos: 17
- Demo albums: 3
- Box sets: 1
- Promo singles: 8

This discography of rock music singer-songwriter Liz Phair consists of seven studio albums, three extended plays, seventeen singles, three compilations, two video albums, seventeen music videos and one box set. She recorded three self-produced cassettes as Girly-Sound in the early 1990s.

Her first two albums, Exile in Guyville and Whip-Smart, were certified Gold in the United States by the RIAA. Her 2003 single "Why Can't I?" was also certified Gold in the United States by the RIAA.

== Albums ==
=== Studio albums ===
Title	Album details	Peak chart positions		Sales	Certifications
Title	Album details	US	US Indie	Sales	Certifications
Exile in Guyville	Released: June 22, 1993; Label: Matador; Format: LP, CD, CD/DVD, cassette, digital download, streaming	196	×	US: 491,000	RIAA: Gold
Whip-Smart	Released: September 20, 1994; Label: Matador, Atlantic; Format: LP, CD, cassette, digital download, streaming	27	×	US: 412,000	RIAA: Gold
Whitechocolatespaceegg	Released: August 11, 1998; Label: Matador, Capitol; Format: LP, CD, cassette, digital download, streaming	35	×	US: 293,000	
Liz Phair	Released: June 24, 2003; Label: Capitol; Format: LP, CD, digital download, streaming	27	—	US: 433,000	RIAA: Gold
Somebody's Miracle	Released: October 4, 2005; Label: Capitol; Format: CD, CD/DVD, digital download, streaming	46	—	US: 83,000	
Funstyle	Released: July 3, 2010; Label: Rocket Science Ventures; Format: CD, digital download	— (Note: Funstyle did not enter the US Billboard 200 chart, which was not established until December 13, 2014, but peaked at number 181 on the US Billboard Top Current Album Sales chart.)	30		
Soberish	Released: June 4, 2021; Label: Chrysalis; Format: LP, CD, digital download, streaming	— (Note: Soberish did not enter the US Billboard 200, but peaked at number 25 on the Top Album Sales chart.)	—		
"—" denotes a recording that did not chart. "×" denotes a period where a chart did not exist or was not archived.

=== Compilation albums ===
Title	Album details	Peak chart positions	
Title	Album details	US Sales	US Indie
iTunes Originals	Released: 2005; Label: Capitol; Format: Digital download	—	—
Icon	Released: 2014; Label: Capitol, UMe; Format: CD	—	—
Girly-Sound to Guyville: The 25th Anniversary Box Set	Released: May 4, 2018; Label: Matador; Format: 3×CD, 7×LP, digital download, streaming	51	14
The Girly-Sound Tapes	Released: May 4, 2018; Label: Matador; Format: Digital download, streaming	—	—
"—" denotes a recording that did not chart. "×" denotes a period where a chart did not exist or was not archived.

=== Demo albums ===
Title	Album details
Girly Sound: Yo Yo Buddy Yup Yup Word to Ya Muthuh	Released: 1991; Label: Self-released; Format: Cassette
Girly Sound: GirlsGirlsGirls	Released: 1991; Label: Self-released; Format: Cassette
Girly Sound: Sooty	Released: 1991; Label: Self-released; Format: Cassette

== Extended plays ==
Title	EP Details
Juvenilia	Released: August 2, 1995; Label: Matador; Format: CD, LP
Comeandgetit	Released: June 24, 2003; Label: Capitol; Format: Digital download
Chicago Apple (live)	Released: 2004; Label: Capitol; Format: Digital download

== Singles ==
=== As lead artist ===
Title	Year	Peak chart positions						Certifications	Album
Title	Year	US	US Alt.	US Adult	US Pop	US Triple A	AUS	Certifications	Album
"Carnivore"	1993	—	—	—	—	—	—		Non-album single
"Supernova"	1994	78	6	—	—	—	43		Whip-Smart
"Whip-Smart"	1995	—	24	—	—	—	—		Whip-Smart
"Polyester Bride" (Note: "Polyester Bride" was an international commercial single in Japan only and a promotional single in the US and Europe.)	1998	—	—	—	—	—	—		Whitechocolatespaceegg
"Why Can't I?"	2003	32	—	7	10	—	—	RIAA: Gold	Liz Phair
"Extraordinary"	2004	— (Note: "Extraordinary" charted at number 11 on the Bubbling Under Hot 100 Singles chart, a 25-song extension to the Billboard Hot 100.)	—	14	28	—	—		Liz Phair
"Everything to Me"	2005	—	—	27	—	—	—		Somebody's Miracle
"Bollywood"	2010	—	—	—	—	—	—		Funstyle
"And He Slayed Her"	2012	—	—	—	—	—	—		Funstyle
"Ho Ho Ho"	2014	—	—	—	—	—	—		Non-album single (Note: "Ho Ho Ho" was released by Amazon as part of a holiday music collection playlist All Is Bright.)
"Divorce Song" (Girly-Sound Version)	2018	—	—	—	—	—	—		Girly-Sound to Guyville: The 25th Anniversary Box Set
"Bomb" (Girly-Sound Version)	2018	—	—	—	—	—	—		Girly-Sound to Guyville: The 25th Anniversary Box Set
"Good Side"	2019	—	—	—	—	24	—		Soberish
"Hey Lou"	2021	—	—	—	—	—	—		Soberish
"Spanish Doors"	2021	—	—	—	—	31	—		Soberish
"In There"	2021	—	—	—	—	—	—		Soberish
"The Game"	2021	—	—	—	—	—	—		Soberish
"—" denotes a single that did not chart.

=== Promotional singles ===
Title	Year	Album
"Never Said"	1993	Exile in Guyville
"Stratford-on-Guy"	1993	Exile in Guyville
"Jealousy"	1995	Whip-Smart
"Rocket Boy"	1996	Stealing Beauty Original Soundtrack
"The Tra La La Song (One Banana, Two Banana)"	1996	Saturday Morning: Cartoons' Greatest Hits
"Johnny Feelgood"	1998	Whitechocolatespaceegg
"Dotted Line"	2012	People Like Us Original Soundtrack
"Miss Lucy"	2023	Non-album single (Note: "Miss Lucy" was recorded for her 1993 debut album Exile in Guyville, but not included on the album. The song was released individually on June 22, 2023.)

=== As featured artist ===
Title	Year	Artist	Album
"Soak Up the Sun"	2002	Sheryl Crow	C'mon, C'mon
"Chemistry"	2005	Kyle Riabko	Before I Speak
"Sorry Baby"	2007	Minnie Driver	Seastories
"Here Comes Your Man"	2018	Pete Yorn	Pete Yorn Sings the Classics
"Theme from Mahogany (Do You Know Where You're Going To)"	2018	Pete Yorn	Pete Yorn Sings the Classics

=== B-sides ===
B-sides	Year	A-sides
"Carnivore" (Raw)	1993	"Carnivore"
"Combo Platter" (Girlysound)	1994	"Supernova"
"Whip-Smart" (Remix)	1995	"Whip-Smart"
"Greased Lightning"/"White Bird of Texas"	1998	"Polyester Bride"
"Jeremy Engle"/"Fine Again"	2003	"Why Can't I?"

== Other contributions ==
Title	Year	Album
"Don't Have Time"	1995	Higher Learning Original Soundtrack
"Six Dick Pimp"	1996	Brain Candy Original Soundtrack
"California"	1997	Chasing Amy Original Soundtrack
"Erecting a Movie Star"	1997	First Love, Last Rites Original Soundtrack
"Stuck on an Island"	1997	What's Up, Matador?
"Freak of Nature"	1998	Local 101 (Chicago radio sampler)
"Don't Apologize"	2003	CMJ Sampler
"Winter Wonderland"	2003	Sounds of the Season – The NBC Holiday Collection
"Mother's Little Helper"	2005	Desperate Housewives Original Soundtrack
"Bend" (with Eric Hirshberg)	2006	Payola 2 (Australian Smashed Records compilation)
"Perfect Misfit"	2007	Nancy Drew Original Soundtrack
"Free Ride"	2023	The Endless Coloured Ways: The Songs of Nick Drake

== Videography ==
=== Video albums ===
Title	Album details
Somebody's Miracle / Liz Phair: A Retrospective	Released: October 4, 2005; Label: Capitol; Format: CD/DVD
Exile in Guyville 15th Anniversary Edition / Guyville Redux	Released: June 24, 2008; Label: ATO; Format: CD/DVD

=== Music videos ===
Title	Year	Director	Album
"Stratford-on-Guy"	1993	Liz Phair	Exile in Guyville
"Never Said"	1993	Katy Maguire	Exile in Guyville
"Supernova"	1994	Liz Phair	Whip-Smart
"Whip-Smart"	1995	Liz Phair	Whip-Smart
"Jealousy"	1995	Liz Phair	Whip-Smart
"The Tra La La Song (One Banana, Two Banana)"	1996	Jean Pellerin	Saturday Morning: Cartoons' Greatest Hits
"Rocket Boy"	1996	Jon Mintz	Stealing Beauty Original Soundtrack
"Polyester Bride"	1998	Kevin Kerslake	Whitechocolatespaceegg
"Down"	2001	Rodney Ascher	N/A
"Why Can't I?"	2003	Phil Harder	Liz Phair
"Extraordinary"	2004	Phil Harder	Liz Phair
"Everything to Me"	2005	Phil Harder	Somebody's Miracle
"And He Slayed Her"	2012	Joey Boukadakis and Paul Boukadakis	Funstyle
"Hey Lou"	2021	Toben Seymour	Soberish
"Spanish Doors"	2021	—N/a	Soberish
"In There"	2021	Katia Temkin	Soberish
"The Game"	2021	Angela Kohler	Soberish
