= Bollywood (song) =

Single by Liz Phair

from the album Funstyle
- Released: July 3, 2010
- Recorded: 2008–2010
- Genre: Electropop; bhangra; hip-hop
- Length: 2:42
- Label: Rocket Science Records
- Songwriter: Liz Phair
- Producers: Evan Frankfort; Dave Matthews

Liz Phair singles chronology
"Everything to Me" (2005)	"Bollywood" (2010)	"And He Slayed Her" (2012)

"Bollywood" is a song by American recording artist Liz Phair. The song was her first release after breaking from Capitol Records and Dave Matthews' record label, ATO Records, and discusses the discrimination and bureaucracy present in the music industry. It was released as the lead single from her sixth album, Funstyle, and was subject to negative reviews from critics, who criticized Phair's vocal performance and the production.

== Background ==
Following the commercial disappointment of Somebody's Miracle, which was her first album since Exile in Guyville to fail to reach the Top 40 of the Billboard 200, Liz Phair left Capitol Records and signed to ATO Records, Dave Matthews' record label, in 2008. She composed some of the songs for her next album, Funstyle, while she was signed to ATO, but after the label refused to release the music, she asked to leave. She then signed to the indie rock label Rocket Science Records, on which she released Funstyle.

== Composition ==
"Bollywood" was released about two years after her split from ATO; like many of the songs on Funstyle, "Bollywood" mocks the record industry, discussing sexism and ageism, and the confusing nature of record deals. The song incorporates sound effects and vocal processing. The song itself lasts two minutes and 22 seconds, though 20 seconds of silence are appended to the end of the track on Funstyle.

== Critical reception ==
The single was panned by critics. Entertainment Weekly's Leah Greenblatt proclaimed that the single demonstrated that "the Exile in Guyville Liz Phair we once knew and loved has officially left the building," while Jody Rosen of Rolling Stone awarded the single one out of five stars and stated: "As tabla-laden electro tinkles behind her, Phair tells a tale of music-biz misadventure, 'rapping' in a voice that sounds like a soccer mom impersonating Ke$ha," concluding that the song was "an insult to rappers everywhere, even the terrible ones." The Village Voice ranked "Bollywood" at #14 on their list of the 20 worst songs of 2010, calling her rapping "sub-Madonna at best".

Some critics defended Phair, however, arguing that the song is one of her most honest. In The Guardian, Priya Alan argued that the song demonstrated that Phair had "returned to form" and concluded that the song is "the most uninhibited, alive and honest she's sounded in years."
