= Girly-Sound =

- Artwork for Sooty

Demo album (Bootleg) by Girly-Sound
- Released: 1991; May 4, 2018
- Recorded: 1991
- Genres: Lo-fi; indie rock
- Length: 154:31 (remastered version)
- Labels: Self-released; Matador
- Producer: Liz Phair

Liz Phair chronology
Girly-Sound (1991)	Exile in Guyville (1993)

Singles from Girly-Sound to Guyville: The 25th Anniversary Box Set
- 1. "Divorce Song" Released: March 15, 2018; 2. "Bomb" Released: April 19, 2018

Professional ratings
Review scores
Source	Rating
AllMusic	4.5/5 stars

Girly-Sound is the name under which singer-songwriter Liz Phair recorded three self-produced cassettes in 1991. The cassettes were later made available as bootlegs, some songs saw official releases, and the tapes were released in their entirety in 2018. Girly-Sound is also the name used to refer to the demos or bootlegs collectively. The recordings have been called "legendary" by Spin magazine and "one of the most popular and sought-after alternative rock bootlegs of all time" by AllMusic.

== Background ==
Recorded on a 4-track cassette recorder in her childhood bedroom at her parents' house, copies of the tapes were initially given by Phair to only two people in 1991: friends and fellow musicians Chris Brokaw and Tae Won Yu. However, copies of the Girly-Sound tapes were passed from person to person and became something of a sensation in the American tape trading/zine subculture. Brokaw later told Rolling Stone how he had urged Phair to record something and a few months later received a tape of 14 songs, with a second 14-song tape following a month later. In 1992, Phair signed a deal with Matador Records on the strength of a demo tape she had sent them of six Girly-Sound songs.

== Reworking ==
Phair has frequently gone back and reworked many of the songs for her studio albums throughout her career: she told Rolling Stone "I go in there and rip stuff off – it's like a library". Much of Phair's debut album Exile in Guyville contains reworkings of songs from these tapes. However, the content of some of these tracks was modified in ways that altered meanings and messages; in "Flower" the line "I'll fuck you and your girlfriend, too" was changed to "I'll fuck you and your minions, too." In addition to this, the final chorus of "Bomb" which tells of a passenger on a plane sabotaging and taking it out was entirely removed; the title of the song was changed to "Stratford-on-Guy" and a new chorus was written. Reworkings of "Ant in Alaska" and "Wild Thing" appeared on the 2008 reissue of Exile in Guyville.

Five songs were officially released in 1995 on the Juvenilia EP and a bonus disc of ten Girly-Sound songs was included with the physical release of Phair's 2010 album Funstyle.

== Bootlegs ==
Although originally consisting of a total of three cassettes, the most common version of the Girly-Sound tapes that circulated among Phair's fans was an incomplete two-disc compilation of songs from all three tapes, released on the Bliss and Fetish bootleg label, and processed with harsh digital noise reduction. An earlier bootleg compilation of Girly-Sound material, Secretly Timid, was also circulated. Early in 2006, mp3s of first-generation copies of the first two tapes were introduced via Phair's online community, bringing to light the original track listing, correct song names, tape titles, and introducing a number of songs that did not appear on the previous Girly-Sound bootlegs. Information about the third Girly-Sound tape, Sooty, was elusive until the 2018 release of Girly-Sound to Guyville, in which it was presented in its entirety.

== 2018 rereleases ==
On May 4, 2018, Matador reissued Exile in Guyville remastered for its 25th anniversary on CD, 2LP & digital (18 files). On the same day it also released a box set titled Girly-Sound to Guyville consisting of the original album remastered and Phair's three Girly-Sound demo tapes, available as a 7LP box set, a 3CD set and a digital deluxe edition (56 files). At the same time, the tapes themselves were separately reissued and released digitally under the title The Girly-Sound Tapes. This release omitted "Fuck or Die" and "Shatter" due to sample clearance issues.

== Critical reaction ==
AllMusic rated the demos 4.5/5, noting some weak tracks but finding others "as tuneful and provoking as anything on her official albums".

== Three tape track listing ==
=== Yo Yo Buddy Yup Yup Word to Ya Muthuh ===
All tracks are written by Liz Phair, except where noted.

No.	Title	Length
1.	"White Babies"	3:06
2.	"Shane"	4:46
3.	"Six Dick Pimp"	3:19
4.	"Divorce Song"	3:47
5.	"Go West"	3:23
6.	"Don't Hold Your Breath" (Stylized as "Dn'tholdyrbreath")	3:59
7.	"Johnny Sunshine"	3:51
8.	"Miss Lucy"	2:18
9.	"Elvis Song"	4:56
10.	"Dead Shark"	3:24
11.	"One Less Thing"	4:38
12.	"Money"	3:36
13.	"In Love With Yourself" (Stylized as "In Love W/Yself")	3:58
14.	"Fuck or Die" (Liz Phair, Johnny Cash)	3:20
Total length:		52:21

=== GIRLSGIRLSGIRLS ===
All tracks are written by Liz Phair, except where noted.

No.	Title	Length
1.	"Hello Sailor" (Liz Phair, George Harry Sanders, Clarence Kelley)	5:57
2.	"Wild Thing" (parody/cover of the 1966 single by The Troggs; Chip Taylor, lyrical parody by Liz Phair)	3:41
3.	"Fuck and Run"	4:31
4.	"Easy Target" (Phair, Berry Gordy, Jr., Rudy Clark)	5:04
5.	"Soap Star Joe"	3:24
6.	"Ant in Alaska"	7:11
7.	"Girls! Girls! Girls!" (Stylized as "GIRLSGIRLSGIRLS")	6:56
8.	"Polyester Bride"	7:39
9.	"Thrax"	4:35
10.	"Miss Mary Mack"	4:32
11.	"Clean"	3:59
12.	"Love Song"	6:20
13.	"Valentine"	4:15
14.	"Shatter" (Phair, Jagger/Richards, Carl Perkins)	6:51
Total length:		74:55

=== Sooty ===
Track order was obtained from the 2018 Girly-Sound to Guyville release.

All tracks are written by Liz Phair, except where noted.

No.	Title	Length
1.	"Gigolo"	3:25
2.	"Flower"	2:48
3.	"Batmobile"	3:10
4.	"Slave" (Liz Phair, Jim Reid, William Reid)	3:50
5.	"Open Season"	2:59
6.	"Whip-Smart" (Liz Phair, chorus by Malcolm McLaren)	3:30
7.	"Suckerfish"	1:49
8.	"California"	2:51
9.	"South Dakota"	4:21
10.	"Bomb"	3:21
11.	"Easy"	3:16
12.	"Chopsticks"	2:00
Total length:		37:20

== Re-recorded songs ==
Year	Album	Song
1991	Chinny Chin Chin: 4 N.Y. Bands	"White Babies"
1993	Exile in Guyville	
1993	Exile in Guyville	"Divorce Song"
1993	Exile in Guyville	"Johnny Sunshine"
1993	Exile in Guyville	"Wild Thing"
1993	Exile in Guyville	"Fuck and Run"
1993	Exile in Guyville	"Soap Star Joe"
1993	Exile in Guyville	"Ant in Alaska"
1993	Exile in Guyville	"Girls! Girls! Girls!"
1993	Exile in Guyville	"Clean" (as "Never Said")
1993	Exile in Guyville	"Shatter"
1993	Exile in Guyville	"Flower"
1993	Exile in Guyville	"Bomb" (as "Stratford-on-Guy")
1994	Whip-Smart	"Shane"
1994	Whip-Smart	"Go West"
1994	Whip-Smart	"Thrax" (as "Jealousy")
1994	Whip-Smart	"Whip-Smart"
1994	Whip-Smart	"Chopsticks"
1996	Kids in the Hall: Brain Candy Soundtrack	"Six Dick Pimp"
1998	whitechocolatespaceegg	"Money" (as "Shitloads of Money")
1998	whitechocolatespaceegg	"Polyester Bride"
1998	whitechocolatespaceegg	"Thrax" (as "Tell Me You Like Me")
2005	Somebody's Miracle	"Gigolo" (as "Can't Get Out of What I'm Into")

- "Ant in Alaska" and "Wild Thing" were both re-recorded for Exile in Guyville, but did not appear until the 2008 reissue; "Wild Thing" only appeared on advanced promotional copies of the reissue.
- The verses in "Thrax" were reused in "Jealousy", featured on Whip-Smart. The interludes were rewritten and used for "Tell Me You Like Me", recorded during the whitechocolatespaceegg sessions.
- "Gigolo" was re-recorded as "Can't Get Out of What I'm Into" for Somebody's Miracle, though the song was only included on the Japanese release and advance promotional copies.

== Song appearances ==
Year	Album	Song
1995	Juvenilia	"California"
1995	Juvenilia	"Batmobile"
1995	Juvenilia	"South Dakota"
1995	Juvenilia	"Dead Shark"
1995	Juvenilia	"Easy"
1997	Chasing Amy Soundtrack	"California"
2010	Funstyle (bonus disc)	"Miss Mary Mack"
2010	Funstyle (bonus disc)	"White Babies"
2010	Funstyle (bonus disc)	"Elvis Song"
2010	Funstyle (bonus disc)	"Valentine"
2010	Funstyle (bonus disc)	"Speed Racer"
2010	Funstyle (bonus disc)	"In Love With Yourself"
2010	Funstyle (bonus disc)	"Wild Thing"
2010	Funstyle (bonus disc)	"Love Song"
2010	Funstyle (bonus disc)	"Don't Hold Your Breath"
2010	Funstyle (bonus disc)	"California"

- Fragments from "In Love With Yourself", "Johnny Sunshine", and "Money" appeared on the "Supernova" single, condensed into one track called "Combo Platter (Girlysound)". The "Johnny Sunshine" fragment is played backwards.
