= Fuck and Run =

Song by Liz Phair

from the album Exile in Guyville
- Released: 1993
- Studio: Idful, Chicago, Illinois
- Genre: Indie rock; noise pop
- Length: 3:07
- Label: Matador
- Songwriter: Liz Phair
- Producer: Brad Wood

"Fuck and Run" is a song by American singer-songwriter Liz Phair from her debut studio album Exile in Guyville (1993). The song was written by Phair and produced by Brad Wood.

== Background and recording ==
According to a 2018 interview with Elle.com, Phair stated: "there was no one encounter that I went home and just wrote the song about". In 1993, Phair re-recorded "Fuck and Run" for her debut album Exile in Guyville. The album's title is a parody of the Rolling Stones album Exile on Main St., which was very much an influence on Phair while recording the final album version of "Fuck and Run".

== Later performances ==
Phair has continued to perform this song live, including a version performed at Planned Parenthood in 2017 that went viral.
