= Whip-Smart (song) =

Single by Liz Phair

from the album Whip-Smart
- Released: February 15, 1995
- Recorded: 1994
- Studio: Idful, Chicago, Illinois; Compass Point, Nassau, Bahamas
- Genre: Indie rock
- Length: 4:18
- Label: Matador
- Songwriters: Liz Phair; Malcolm McLaren
- Producers: Liz Phair; Brad Wood

Liz Phair singles chronology
| "Supernova" (1994) | "Whip-Smart" (1995) | "Jealousy" (1995) |

"Whip-Smart" is a song by American singer-songwriter Liz Phair from her second album Whip-Smart, released in 1994. The song interpolates the chorus from Malcolm McLaren's 1983 hit "Double Dutch."

The song peaked at No. 24 on the Modern Rock Tracks chart.

== Reception ==
Cashbox awarded the song their 'Pick of the Week', commenting that "the title track from Phair’s critically-lauded second album is an even more infectious pop single than the album’s first focus track, “Supernova". Where that song helped push Phair further into the mainstream, this one will continue her ascension into pop culture. With its catchy chorus of “When they do the double-dutch,” this track will reach out to listeners who might’ve thought her too cryptic before, but the sharp lyrics will continue to delight her faithful fans. "Whip-Smart" is a strong way to start off the new year for one of the scene’s most engaging performers."

== Track listing ==
All tracks are written by Liz Phair.

Promo Single 1
| No. | Title | Length |
|---|---|---|
| 1. | "Whip-Smart" | 4:18 |

Promo Single 2
| No. | Title | Length |
|---|---|---|
| 1. | "Whip-Smart" (Remix) | 4:12 |
| 2. | "Whip-Smart" | 4:18 |

== Charts ==
| Chart (1994–1995) | Peak position |
|---|---|
| US Alternative Airplay (Billboard) | 24 |
