= Funstyle =

Album by Liz Phair

Studio album by Liz Phair
- Released: July 3, 2010
- Recorded: 2008–2010
- Studios: Robert Lang (Shoreline, Washington); Wouldwork Sound; Engine Studios
- Genres: Pop rock; alternative rock
- Length: 40:26
- Label: Rocket Science Records
- Producers: Evan Frankfort; Dave Matthews; Brett Radin; Kevin Griffin; Doc Dauer

Liz Phair chronology
Somebody's Miracle (2005)	Funstyle (2010)	Soberish (2021)

Singles from Funstyle
- 1. "Bollywood" Released: July 3, 2010; 2. "And He Slayed Her" Released: May 21, 2012

Digital edition cover

Funstyle is the sixth studio album by Liz Phair, independently released on her official website on July 3, 2010. A CD version was released on October 19, 2010 on Rocket Science Records. It includes a bonus disc containing ten songs from her Girly-Sound tapes.

== Background ==
Funstyle was Phair's first album after leaving Capitol Records. Phair posted the following message on her website:

You were never supposed to hear these songs. These songs lost me my management, my record deal and a lot of nights of sleep.
Yes, I rapped one of them. I'm as surprised as you are. But here is the thing you need to know about these songs and the ones coming next: These are all me. Love them, or hate them, but don't mistake them for anything other than an entirely personal, un-tethered-from-the-machine, free for all view of the world, refracted through my own crazy lens.
This is my journey. I'll keep sending you postcards.

The lyrics that appear on Phair's arm on the album cover are partial lyrics to the songs "Satisfied", "Bang! Bang!", "Miss September", and "Bollywood".

A music video was made for "And He Slayed Her", and premiered on May 21, 2012.

== Reception ==
Professional ratings
Aggregate scores
Source	Rating
Metacritic	51/100
Review scores
Source	Rating
AllMusic	3.5/5 stars
American Songwriter	2.5/5 stars
The Austin Chronicle	2/5 stars
The A.V. Club	D+
Beats Per Minute	41%
Consequence of Sound	D
Pitchfork	2.6/10
PopMatters	7/10
Slant	2.5/5 stars
Tiny Mix Tapes	4/5 marks

On the review aggregator website Metacritic, Funstyle has a score of 51 out of 100, which indicates "mixed or average reviews". Though the album's reviews were not generally positive, it was better-received than her self-titled 2003 release.

Some reviews of the album were complimentary. AllMusic's Stephen Thomas Erlewine awarded the album 3 and a half out of 5 stars, remarking "it’s actually terribly refreshing to hear Phair so loose," and stating the album shows that Liz Phair "is on her way to once again being a compelling artist unafraid to take risks." Likewise, a review by Tiny Mix Tapes praised the album and stated: "she has crafted above all else an experience, and one that is entertaining and rewarding in ways that few records can be."

Other reviewers were far more critical of the album, however. Pitchfork awarded the album 2.6 out of 10, called it "baffling," and stated that the album was ultimately "a shrewd way to lower expectations". Notably, however, Pitchfork gave Funstyle a higher rating than either of Liz Phair's preceding two albums. The A.V. Club's Michaelangelo Matos was equally negative, stating that the tongue-in-cheek songs "aren't especially listenable" and "the seven straighter songs those experiments surround have just as little to recommend them."

== Track listing ==
=== Funstyle track listing ===
All tracks are written by Liz Phair, except "My My" (Phair, Kevin Griffin) and "Satisfied" (Phair, Doc Dauer, Evan Frankfort).

No.	Title	Length
1.	"Smoke"	3:14
2.	"Bollywood"	2:42
3.	"You Should Know Me"	2:54
4.	"Miss September"	4:24
5.	"My My"	3:32
6.	"Oh, Bangladesh"	4:39
7.	"Bang! Bang!"	3:44
8.	"Beat Is Up"	3:19
9.	"And He Slayed Her"	3:35
10.	"Satisfied"	3:31
11.	"U Hate It"	4:58
Total length:		40:32

=== Girlysound track listing ===
All tracks are written by Liz Phair, except "Wild Thing" (Chip Taylor, lyrical parody by Phair).

No.	Title	Length
1.	"Miss Mary Mack"	4:30
2.	"White Babies"	3:03
3.	"Elvis Song"	4:55
4.	"Valentine"	4:14
5.	"Speed Racer"	1:41
6.	"In Love With Yourself"	3:56
7.	"Wild Thing" (parody/cover of the 1966 single by The Troggs)	3:40
8.	"Love Song"	6:19
9.	"Don't Hold Yr Breath"	3:58
10.	"California"	2:41
Total length:		38:57

- "Wild Thing" was written by Chip Taylor and rewritten by Liz Phair but credited to Liz Phair and The Troggs on Funstyle.

== Personnel ==
- Liz Phair – vocals, guitars, bass guitar, keyboards
- Dave Matthews – guitar

== Charts ==
Chart (2010)	Peak position
US Top Current Album Sales (Billboard)	181
US Independent Albums (Billboard)	30
