= Extraordinary (Liz Phair song) =

2004 single by Liz Phair

Single by Liz Phair

from the album Liz Phair
- Released: March 1, 2004
- Studio: Decoy (Studio City)
- Genre: Pop rock
- Length: 3:24
- Label: Capitol
- Songwriters: Lauren Christy; Scott Spock; Graham Edwards; Liz Phair
- Producer: The Matrix

Liz Phair singles chronology
"Why Can't I?" (2003)	"Extraordinary" (2004)	"Everything to Me" (2005)

Music video
- "Extraordinary" on YouTube

"Extraordinary" is a song by American singer-songwriter Liz Phair from her self-titled fourth studio album (2003). It was released to radio as the second single from the album on March 1, 2004, by Capitol Records. The song was written by Phair and the production team the Matrix, which consists of Lauren Christy, Scott Spock, and Graham Edwards. Production on the song was solely helmed by the Matrix. According to Phair, the song is about wanting others to see you for who you are.

== Background ==
"Extraordinary" was written by Phair and the production team the Matrix. The song was inspired by feelings Phair experienced of wanting to be seen for who she really is. Phair explained: "I feel like in my life I've always struggled against being kind of the girl-next-door to people, and always wanting people to see me as maybe having more depth."

Phair described the song as an updated version of "6'1", a song from Exile in Guyville.

== Use in media ==
The song was featured in the 2004 film Raising Helen. It was also featured during the opening credits for the season finale of Charmed's fifth season, titled "Oh My Goddess!", as a special preview ten months before its official release. The song was included on the teen pop compilation Got Hits! 2 as well. The song was included on the soundtrack for Queer Eye for the Straight Guy.

== Music video ==
Two music videos for the song were released. The first features black-and-white footage of Phair singing the song. After the song was featured in the 2004 film Raising Helen, a second music video was made, featuring clones of Phair in front of various backdrops.

== Critical reception ==
The song garnered mixed reviews from music critics, who were dissatisfied with her attempt to go mainstream. Slate's Mim Udovitch said that Phair sounds "bogus," while PopMatters called the song "sickeningly effervescent." Some critics were more complimentary towards the song, however. Chuck Klosterman, writing for Spin, praised the song's "authenticity," while AllMusic noted that it was one of its parent album's highlights. Michael Paoletta of Billboard called the song "ultra-catchy" and "oh-so-buoyant".

== Commercial performance ==
Though the song failed to recreate the chart success of past hits "Supernova" and "Why Can't I?" it still managed to chart. It reached number 111 in the US, spending a total of 5 weeks on the "Bubbling Under Hot 100" chart. It also charted on the Mainstream Top 40 chart and the Adult Top 40 chart, on which it spent six months.

== Credits and personnel ==
Credits and personnel are adapted from the Liz Phair album liner notes.

- Liz Phair – writer, lead vocals
- The Matrix – writer, producer, arrangement, recording, additional vocals
- Krish Sharma – drum recording
- Serban Ghenea – mixing
- Corky James – guitars
- Victor Indrizzo – drums
- The Wizardz of Oz – additional vocals

== Charts ==
Peak chart positions of "Extraordinary"
Chart (2003–2004)	Peak position
US Bubbling Under Hot 100 (Billboard)	11
US Adult Pop Airplay (Billboard)	14
US Pop Airplay (Billboard)	28

== Release history ==
Region	Date	Formats(s)	Label(s)	Ref(s).
United States	March 1, 2004	Contemporary hit radio	Capitol Records	
