= Spanish Doors =

2021 single by Liz Phair

Single by Liz Phair

from the album Soberish
- Released: April 14, 2021
- Studio: Sea Grass Studio (Los Angeles)
- Genre: Indie rock
- Length: 3:57 (album mix); 3:25 (single mix)
- Label: Chrysalis
- Songwriter: Liz Phair
- Producer: Brad Wood

Liz Phair singles chronology
"Hey Lou" (2021)	"Spanish Doors" (2021)	"In There" (2021)

Music video
- "Spanish Doors" on YouTube

"Spanish Doors" is a single by American singer-songwriter Liz Phair. The song was written by Phair, with Brad Wood producing the song. It was released on April 14, 2021, by Chrysalis Records as the third single from Phair's seventh studio album, Soberish. The song speaks about the struggles of divorce, and about how a life can be fractured in its wake. "Spanish Doors" received mixed reviews from critics, with some saying that the song harkened back to her earlier releases, while others criticised the mixing of the track. The single received airplay on US adult album alternative radio, peaking at number 31 on the Billboard Adult Alternative Airplay chart.

== Background ==
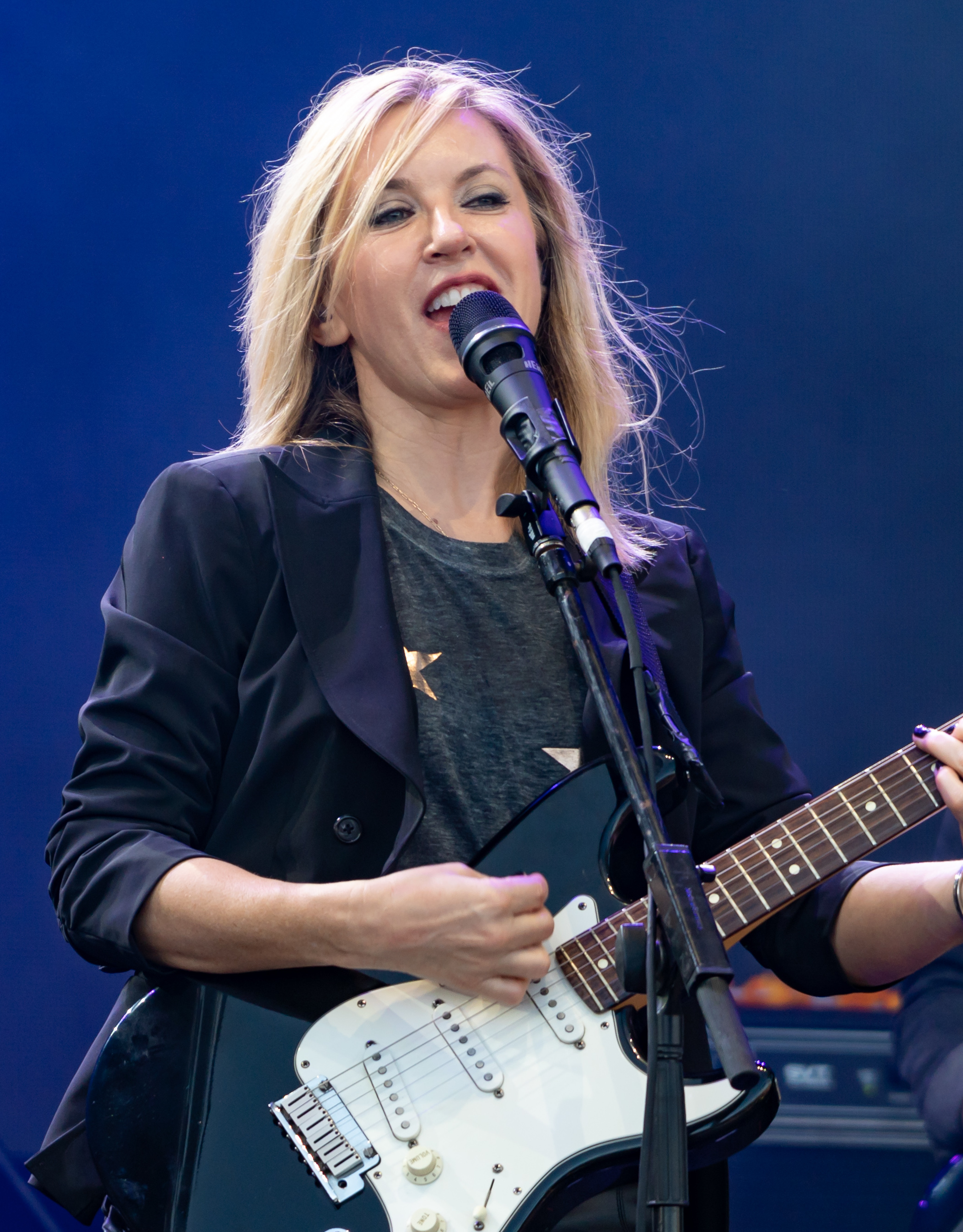
Liz Phair wrote "Spanish Doors" about a life falling apart, taking inspiration from a friend's divorce.

"Spanish Doors" was released on April 14, 2021, alongside the tracklist and release date for Soberish. Liz Phair wrote that "'Spanish Doors' is "about the fracturing of a beautiful life, when everything you counted on is suddenly thrown up for grabs". Phair said that while she did "draw inspiration" from the divorce of a friend in writing "Spanish Doors", the actions described in the song were her own, explaining that "I relate to hiding out in the bathroom when everyone around you is having a good time but your life just fell apart...just a few moments ago you were a whole, confident person and now you wonder how you'll ever get the magic back."

== Composition ==
"Spanish Doors" contains elements of 1990s alternative rock, grunge and layered vocal production. Lyrically, it was described by Rolling Stone as "addressing the struggles of divorce". The album mix of "Spanish Doors" is 32 seconds longer than the single release, at 3:57 of length. "Spanish Doors" was written by Phair, and produced by Brad Wood, who also served as the mixing engineer for the song.

== Critical reception ==
In a piece for Rolling Stone, Jon Dolan observed similarities between "Spanish Doors" and "Divorce Song"—an earlier track of Phair's from Exile in Guyville—and also noting what he called a "cleverly turned Fleetwood Mac-steeped slickness" on "Spanish Doors". For Pitchfork, Peyton Thomas wrote that "poor mixing keeps the chorus of "Spanish Doors" from fully blasting off", with the backing vocals being brought to the front making Phair's vocals "nearly inaudible". Daniel Sylvester of Exclaim! labeled the song a "muddled mess", saying that the "strong verses and driving rhythm" were covered with "electronic beats, vocal effects, and layered chorus". In an Under the Radar web exclusive, Austin Saalman wrote of "Spanish Doors" as "a frantic breakup anthem not unlike something Phair might have recorded 28 years ago".

== Music video ==
The music video for "Spanish Doors" was released on April 30, 2021. It reflects shortcomings in a relationship with "mirror-like visual effects". In an interview with Billboard, Phair said that "the video for me is about the different selves we play", and that in the context of her romantic life, she will often present herself as a more "idealized self", but when the relationship collapses, Phair is "left looking at that ambassador-self, envying her and also wondering if that's the whole reason it fell through in the first place".

== Live performances ==
Liz Phair performed "Spanish Doors" at an NPR Tiny Desk (Home) Concert, alongside a backing band of Connor Sullivan and Cody Perrin on guitar, Neal Daniels on drums, and Ben Sturley on bass. Phair also played guitar, while providing her vocals.

== Charts ==
Chart performance for "Spanish Doors"
Chart (2021)	Peak position
US Adult Alternative Airplay (Billboard)	31
