= Dotted line =

Dotted line, Dotted Line or The Dotted Line may refer to:

== Animals ==
- Dottedline snake eel
- Dotted-line blenny
- Dotted border (Agriopis marginaria), a moth in the family Geometridae

== Music ==
- A Dotted Line, a 2014 album by Nickel Creek

=== Songs ===
- "Dotted Line", a song by The O'Jays
- "Dotted Line", a song by Spunge from The Story So Far (Spunge album)
- "Dotted Line", a song by Liz Phair for the People Like Us soundtrack, Liz Phair discography
- "The Dotted Line", a single by Skip Ewing
- "Dotted Line/Juju Man", a song by Labrinth from Imagination & the Misfit Kid

== Other uses ==
- Line (graphics), in dotted format
- a leader (typography)
- dotted line reporting, an alternative to solid line reporting between managers and supervisees
- Dotted Line (horse), American Thoroughbred racemare; see Man o' War Stakes
