= Soberish =

Studio album by Liz Phair
- Released: June 4, 2021
- Recorded: 2019–2021
- Studio: Sea Grass Studio (Los Angeles)
- Genre: Indie rock
- Length: 43:45
- Label: Chrysalis
- Producer: Brad Wood

Liz Phair chronology
Funstyle (2010)	Soberish (2021)

Singles from Soberish
- 1. "Good Side" Released: October 8, 2019; 2. "Hey Lou" Released: February 10, 2021; 3. "Spanish Doors" Released: April 14, 2021; 4. "In There" Released: May 16, 2021; 5. "The Game" Released: June 4, 2021

Soberish is the seventh studio album from American singer Liz Phair. It is her first studio album in close to eleven years since 2010's Funstyle and was preceded by five singles: "Good Side", "Hey Lou", "Spanish Doors", "In There", and "The Game". The album was released on June 4, 2021, and is produced by Brad Wood.

== Background ==
Soberish—slated for release in 2020, but eventually released on June 4, 2021—was Liz Phair's first record of entirely new material in eleven years and her first studio album under Chrysalis Records. The album was described by Pitchfork as "highly-anticipated" and was included on Rolling Stone's list of the most anticipated albums of 2021. In the lead-up to the album's release, Phair was interviewed for the New Yorker. The album's first single "Good Side" peaked at number 24 on the Triple-A airplay chart and spent a total of 13 weeks on the chart, while "Spanish Doors" entered the chart at number 39.

Soberish was Phair's first release since 2010's Funstyle, and in an interview with The Independent on May 31, 2021, Phair spoke about the specter of death over Soberish, saying that "when Prince died and [David] Bowie died, my manager called me and he's like, 'What are you doing with your career? Do you know you could be dead tomorrow? Are you making the work now that you would want to leave behind if it were your last?'" Phair said that "it would have been terrible if I had died after [Funstyle]", and that she "will not make that mistake again". Following the album's release, Phair had planned to support Alanis Morissette on her upcoming global tour commemorating the 25th anniversary of Jagged Little Pill, but withdrew on July 24, 2021 "due to unforeseen circumstances", with Cat Power taking Phair's place.

== Songs ==
The opening song on Soberish is "Spanish Doors", an infectious and upbeat song that features electronic beats, vocal effects, and a layered chorus, as well as backing vocals that Pitchfork compared to Haim. It is followed by "The Game", a "saccharine soft rock crooner" with an opening that The A.V. Club compared to John Cougar Mellencamp. The third track on the album is "Hey Lou", which contains orchestral strings, punchy drums and guitars, and lyrically built on crisp couplets. "Hey Lou" shows Phair telling the story of "Laurie Anderson impatiently talking her husband, Lou Reed, out of one of his assholic distempers". Towards the end of "Hey Lou", the line "How did that work out for you?" repeats, "washing over itself in dense layers".

The fourth track on Soberish is "In There", which is a moody electronic ballad that contains a "hard, tinny drum machine". "Good Side", the melodic first single from Soberish, is the fifth track. It opens with what The Guardian described as the "arresting[ly] confessional" lyric of "There are so many ways to fuck up a life/ I've tried to be original". Lyrically, said NME, "it screens like a break-up song, but also feels like a song about artistic legacy". The sixth track is "Sheridan Road", a "vulnerable acoustic confession" with meandering guitar lines where Phair evokes her hometown of Chicago. The seventh track, "Ba Ba Ba", was described by Pitchfork as sweet and gentle, which illustrates "the initial elation of a hotel hookup" with lines such as "I don't have the guts to tell you that I feel great, I feel safe", but then moves towards "the moment where things inevitably unraveled".

Track nine, the album's longest, is "Soul Sucker", which contains an "electric piano groove", and a nod to "Remember Me" by Blue Boy in its chorus. "Lonely Street", the tenth track, is a stripped-down song where Phair adopts the point of view of a lover with lyrics such as "I've gotta run/I've been missing you, girl, like the sun". The eleventh track is "Dosage", a laidback alt-pop ballad, laid on top of cello and sparse beats, where Phair offers "life advice from the perspective of a recovering bad-decision junkie who's still finding her own middle path". The second-to-last track is "Bad Kitty", which deals with more sexual themes, opening with the lyric "My pussy is a big dumb cat, it lies around lazy and fat", and addressing themes of doubt and confidence in the chorus with the line of "I don't live in a world that appreciates me". The record concludes with the 47-second "Rain Scene".

== Critical reception ==
Professional ratings
Aggregate scores
Source	Rating
Metacritic	76/100
Review scores
Source	Rating
AllMusic	4/5 stars
The A.V. Club	B−
Christgau's Consumer Guide	A−
DIY	4/5 stars
Entertainment Weekly	A−
The Independent	4/5 stars
Mojo	3/5 stars
NME	5/5 stars
Pitchfork	7.0/10
Rolling Stone	3.5/5 stars

Soberish has received generally positive reception from music critics. Chris Willman of Variety described the album as a "superior work". NME's El Hunt wrote that "'Soberish' serves as a reminder of Liz Phair's brilliance after years of underestimation", and that the record marks a return to earlier albums in her catalogue, as well as Phair's Girly-Sound mixtapes. In a positive review, Uncut magazine remarked that "Phair always sounds like she's having fun flipping off every last hater"; meanwhile in a mixed review, Mojo magazine described the album as a "mixed bag", "but a welcome return that promises much". Writing for The Guardian, Phil Mongredien called Soberish unforgivably mediocre, saying that "for the most part the coffee-table pop on offer here is remarkable only for being so forgettable".

The album was considered one of the best of 2021 according to Variety, AllMusic, Good Morning America, Forbes, Albumism, The Forty-Five, Allaccess.com and by Carl Wilson in Slate.

The title track was highlighted as "one of the best rock songs of the year" by NPR Music. Variety also listed "In There" among their best songs of 2021.

== Track listing ==
All tracks are written by Liz Phair, except "Hey Lou" and "Dosage" (Phair, Brad Wood), and "Bad Kitty" (Phair, Randy Rettig).

No.	Title	Length
1.	"Spanish Doors"	3:57
2.	"The Game"	3:29
3.	"Hey Lou"	2:42
4.	"In There"	3:12
5.	"Good Side"	2:54
6.	"Sheridan Road"	3:27
7.	"Ba Ba Ba"	3:41
8.	"Soberish"	3:50
9.	"Soul Sucker"	4:33
10.	"Lonely St."	3:31
11.	"Dosage"	4:05
12.	"Bad Kitty"	3:37
13.	"Rain Scene"	0:47
Total length:		43:45

== Personnel ==
Credits are adapted from the album's liner notes.

- Liz Phair – vocals, guitar, art direction
- Brad Wood – guitar, bass, keyboards, drums, percussion, programming, production, mixing, engineering
- Casey Rice – guitar on "In There" and "Lonely St."
- Marc Orrell – mandolin on "Soberish"
- Chick Wolverton – percussion on "Soberish"
- Emily Lazar – mastering
- James N. Staskauskas – artwork, additional engineering on "Soberish" and Bad Kitty"
- Kathy Angstadt – creative direction
- Shea McChrystal – layout
- Lorna Turner – logo

== Charts ==
Chart (2021)	Peak position
Scottish Albums (Official Charts)	52
UK Albums Sales (OCC)	50
UK Independent Albums (Official Charts)	15
US Top Album Sales (Billboard)	25
