= Dope Smugglaz =

UK musical group

- Origin: Leeds, United Kingdom
- Genres: Electronic, House, Deep house
- Years active: 1998–2000
- Label: Perfecto Records
- Past members: Keith Binner; Chico Ijomanta; Tim Sheridan

Dope Smugglaz were a British musical group. They scored two UK chart successes, "The Word" which reached number 62 in 1998 and "Double Double Dutch" which covered Malcolm McLaren's "Double Dutch" and reached 15 in August 1999. In 1999, Dope Smugglaz appeared at the number 96 spot at the DJ Mag Top 100 DJs list.
