= Liz Phair (album) =

Studio album by Liz Phair
- Released: June 24, 2003
- Studios: 12th Floor, Capitol Records Building; Decoy Studios (Studio City, California); Grandmaster; House of Blues Studios (Encino, California); Master Control (North Hollywood, California); Mesmer Ave. Studios; Sage & Sound; Sonora Recorders; Sunset Sound; Third Stone Recording
- Genres: Pop rock; teen pop
- Length: 50:14
- Label: Capitol
- Producers: The Matrix; Michael Penn; Liz Phair; R. Walt Vincent

Liz Phair chronology
whitechocolate spaceegg (1998)	Liz Phair (2003)	Comeandgetit (2003)

Singles from Liz Phair
- 1. "Why Can't I?" Released: May 5, 2003; 2. "Extraordinary" Released: March 1, 2004

Liz Phair is the fourth studio album by the American singer-songwriter Liz Phair, released on June 24, 2003, by Capitol Records. It was produced by Phair, Michael Penn, Pete Yorn, R. Walt Vincent and the Matrix songwriting team.

Liz Phair departed from Phair's earlier lo-fi sound for more polished production and pop songwriting. Phair came under pressure from Capitol to make a hit record, and said she wanted to earn more from her work. She hired the Matrix, who had produced songs by pop acts including Britney Spears, the Backstreet Boys, Ricky Martin and Avril Lavigne. The Matrix co-wrote four songs, including the singles "Extraordinary" and "Why Can't I?".

Liz Phair debuted at #27 on the Billboard 200. "Why Can't I?" entered the Adult Top 40 and Hot Adult Contemporary charts, and its music video placed Phair in heavy rotation on VH1 for the first time. By July 2010, Liz Phair had sold 433,000 copies. It was certified gold in the US in 2018.

Liz Phair received mixed reviews. Several critics disliked the polished production and pop songwriting, and The New York Times and Pitchfork accused Phair of selling out and mimicking younger artists. It earned positive reviews from publications including The Village Voice and Rolling Stone. In 2019, the Pitchfork critic Matt LeMay apologized for his review, saying he had failed to appreciate Phair's willingness to try different approaches.

== Background ==
Phair released her debut album, Exile in Guyville, in 1993. With a raw, lo-fi sound and "punk-feminist" lyrics, it was acclaimed by critics and was eventually certified gold. Her subsequent albums Whip-Smart (1994) and Whitechocolatespaceegg (1998) were less successful.

In 1999, Phair's record label, Matador, was acquired by the major record label Capitol. Phair said the acquisition complicated her work, as it meant she had to work with many more people, many of whom had different aims. The Matador staff she had worked with left, leaving her under pressure at Capitol. Phair described seeing "manufactured" pop groups achieve success while she had no "indie-cool group" to advise her. According to Phair, Andy Slater, the CEO of Capitol, told her: "I'm giving you a shot and if you don't take the shot, there's nothing much I can do for you."

For her fourth album, Phair, now in her 30s, wanted to "feel more like an entrepreneur, not just a dumb artist", and be better rewarded for her work. She said: "I think with many artists there is a gambling spirit – just get out there and don't watch out for yourself – and I think it's a very unhealthy attitude to assume that you're not in business when you actually are." She said that while she enjoyed obscure music, she also listened to commercial pop music and that her aversion to the "rigid" attitudes of indie and alternative music had inspired Exile from Guyville.

== Recording ==
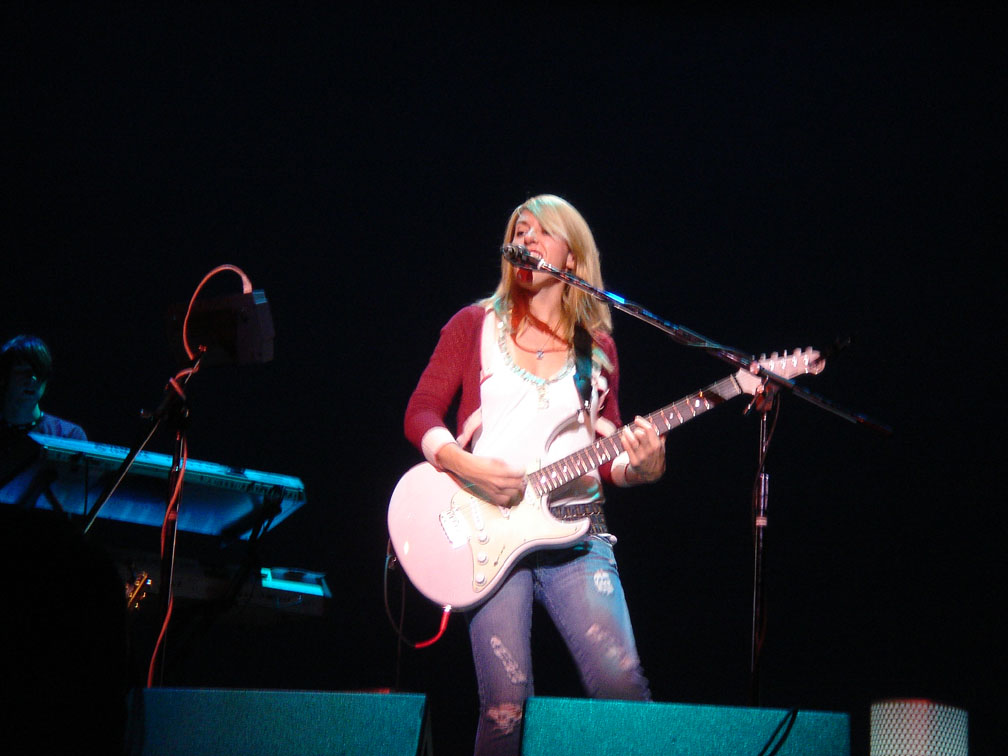
Phair performing in 2005

Phair worked with several producers, including the Matrix team, Michael Penn, Pete Yorn and Yorn's producer R. Walt Vincent. Phair and Penn worked in the Capitol Records Building in Los Angeles. Phair said in October 2001: "He places me in it so beautifully. He'll do things like get an industrial sound and replace it for a snare drum. It's one of the most intense-sounding things I've ever done." Their collaboration ended as, according to Phair, "He tended to like my more serious stuff and he wouldn't let me make a fool of myself, and I really needed to make a little bit of a fool of myself."

Searching for "more spontaneous stuff", Phair recruited the Matrix, who had created songs for pop acts including Britney Spears, the Backstreet Boys, Ricky Martin and Avril Lavigne. Phair said she envied Lavigne's 2002 song "Complicated", and said: "How come I don't ever get to make songs that are blasted out of cars? That's one of the things I've always done my whole life is drive fast and play music loud." With the Matrix, Phair wrote and produced "Extraordinary", "Why Can't I?", "Rock Me" and "Favorite". She said they pushed her to sing different melodies: "It's top-of-the-line song structure, and it was really exciting to graft my DNA with theirs and to see what we came up with."

Phair deliberated over whether to include the song "HWC", which stands for "hot white cum". She said she wrote it "completely sincerely ... I'm talking about being in love and having great sex." She said her female friends loved the song, but that "grown men had a lot of problems with it".

== Release ==
Liz Phair debuted at #27 on the Billboard 200. The single "Why Can't I?" entered the Adult Top 40 and Hot Adult Contemporary charts, and its music video placed Phair in heavy rotation on VH1 for the first time. By July 2010, Liz Phair had sold 433,000 copies. It was certified gold in the United States on May 14, 2018, for sales of 500,000 copies. The album included a download for an EP, Comeandgetit.

== Critical reception ==
Professional ratings
Aggregate scores
Source	Rating
Metacritic	40/100
Review scores
Source	Rating
AllMusic	3/5 stars
Blender	4/5 stars
Christgau's Consumer Guide	A
Entertainment Weekly	A−
The Guardian	1/5 stars
Los Angeles Times	1/4 stars
Mojo	2/5 stars
Pitchfork	0.0/10
Rolling Stone	3/5 stars
Spin	B−

According to the review aggregator site Metacritic, Liz Phair received "mixed or average reviews". The polished production and pop songwriting, a departure from Phair's earlier work, alienated many listeners. According to the Washington Post, Liz Phair "inspired some of the most vitriolic music press in ages, with bad (and surprisingly personal) reviews outgunning the occasional good ones by a huge margin". Many accused Phair of selling out; she became a "piñata for critics", according to The New York Times.

The New York Times critic Meghan O'Rourke titled her review "Liz Phair's exile in Avril-ville", and complained that Phair "gushes like a teenager", having "committed an embarrassing form of career suicide". Matt LeMay of Pitchfork rated the album 0.0, writing, "It's sad that an artist as groundbreaking as Phair would be reduced to cheap publicity stunts and hyper-commercialized teen-pop." The PopMatters critic Adrien Begrand wrote that it was "a highly overproduced, shallow, soulless, confused, pop-by-numbers disaster that betrays everything the woman stood for a decade ago, and most heinously, betrays all her original fans". In the Guardian, Adam Sweeting wrote that Phair's lyrics, once "smart and provocative", had become "crass and bloated", and criticized the sexualized cover photograph.

In the Dallas Observer, Laura Bond wrote that "the problem with Liz Phair isn't so much that Phair's making a bid for the mainstream; it's that she hasn't done so particularly well". She found the singles "Extraordinary" and "Why Can't I?" irritating, feeling they sounded desperate instead of confident, and found the lyrics "oversexed and silly" and "sometimes just plain base". Bond argued that whereas Exile from Guyville used sexual lyrics to explore other topics, such as "the vast murky territories that lie between men and women", Liz Phair instead "feels like the pseudo-sensual posturing of a woman who aspires to join the MTV harem". She felt that the songs Phair wrote alone were the best and "suggest the wit, honesty and flawed humanity that made her endearing in the first place".

In Blender, Ann Powers wrote: "It isn't clear whether Phair knows that audacity as a strategy has diminishing returns; what once shocked now seems like a habit." She felt the best songs "cut through the bullshit to portray a hot young mom reflecting on lust and guilt", and hoped that listeners would hear the intelligence beyond the production values. In Entertainment Weekly, Chris Willman described Liz Phair as "an honestly fun summer disc", noting "Little Digger" and "Rock Me" as highlights. The Slant critic Sal Cinquemani called Phair "frank and funny" and citing "It's Sweet", "My Bionic Eyes", and "Rock Me" as noteworthy tracks. Robert Christgau wrote in The Village Voice that Liz Phair had no bad songs and credited Phair for "successfully fusing the personal and the universal, challenging lowest-common-denominator values even as it fellates them". The Rolling Stone critic Barry Walters wrote that "Rock Me" and "Little Digger" matched the "lofty songwriting standard" of Exile in Guyville, and concluded: "Phair is a fine lyricist, and although she's lost some musical identity, she's gained potential Top Forty access."

Phair said of the criticism: "It's kind of like they involve me in some kind of political scenario. It's like, 'Oh, no! She changed her platform! This isn't what she campaigned on!' Which is good, because it means that they were really attached to the earlier work." Phair said she liked to "encompass opposites", and wanted to express different sides of her personality with her records.

=== Retrospective ===
In 2018, Travis Morrison, who also received a 0.0 score from Pitchfork for his 2004 album Travistan, said he thought Liz Phair was Phair's "most visionary gesture". He wrote: "Now hipsters listen to Carly Rae Jepsen and no one thinks about it. But Liz Phair was pretty ahead of that curve. And she really got some nasty shit about it. Mostly, of course, from white male 'critics'."

In 2019, Phair said she felt O'Rourke's New York Times review had attempted to shame her for dressing and acting sexually as a mother and for trying to reach a broader audience. She said: "Meghan ought to try wearing some hot clothes and having a good time. She might be happier." She said her experience with the album had been "challenging, but good", and that it had helped her "grow a lot as a performer. I did something I was scared to do, like finding my path in a whole new [way]. It's like moving to a new city and making new friends and trying to be a different person." Phair said she was "kind of proud" of the Pitchfork 0.0 rating.

In 2018, asked about the criticism Liz Phair had received from outlets such as Pitchfork, Christgau wrote:

Back then [Pitchfork] was still a snotty boys club open to many "critics" ... Too many amateur wise-asses and self-appointed aesthetes throwing their weight around ... But to return to Liz Phair, it got killed in the indie press for two things: the indie sin of hiring name producers, which my review goes into in some detail, and explicit sexuality. Good sex songs are hard to write, but I love them when they happen; "Favorite" and "HWC" stand out. But the stone classic here is "Little Digger", in which her young son comes into the bedroom she's sharing with a guy not his dad. A complete killer, clearly over LeMay's head.

In 2019, LeMay apologized on Twitter for his "condescending and cringey" Pitchfork review, writing:

In 2019, it is almost inconceivable that there would be any controversy around an established indie musician working on a radio-friendly pop album with radio-friendly pop songwriters. To a smug 19-year-old Pitchfork writer (cough) in 2003, it was just as inconceivable that an established indie artist would try to—or want to—make a radio-friendly pop album in the first place. The idea that "indie rock" and "radio pop" are both cultural constructs? Languages to play with? Masks for an artist to try on? Yeah. I certainly did not get that. Liz Phair DID get that—way before many of us did.

Phair responded to LeMay on Twitter: "I've always enjoyed criticism well-rendered and the 0.0 had some humor to it — enjoyed it more than others I can tell you." In 2021, Pitchfork included Liz Phair on its list of scores they "would change if they could", upgrading its score to 6.0.

== Track listing ==
All tracks are written by Liz Phair, except where noted. Produced by the Matrix (1, 3, 5, 9), Michael Penn (2, 4, 6, 7, 13), Liz Phair (8, 10, 12), and R. Walt Vincent (11, 14).

No.	Title	Length
1.	"Extraordinary" (Liz Phair, Lauren Christy, Scott Spock, Graham Edwards)	3:24
2.	"Red Light Fever" (Phair, Gary Clark)	4:52
3.	"Why Can't I?" (Phair, Christy, Spock, Edwards)	3:28
4.	"It's Sweet"	2:54
5.	"Rock Me" (Phair, Christy, Spock, Edwards)	3:20
6.	"Take a Look"	3:29
7.	"Little Digger"	3:35
8.	"Firewalker"	4:28
9.	"Favorite" (Phair, Christy, Spock, Edwards)	3:24
10.	"Love/Hate"	3:43
11.	"H.W.C."	2:55
12.	"My Bionic Eyes"	3:52
13.	"Friend of Mine"	3:43
14.	"Good Love Never Dies"	2:58
Total length:		50:05

- "H.W.C." is omitted from clean versions of the album.

== Personnel ==
- Liz Phair – guitar, vocals, sampling
- Jebin Bruni – keyboards
- Mario Calire – drums
- Lenny Castro – percussion
- Matt Chamberlain – drums
- Alison Clark – backing vocals
- Mike Elizondo – bass
- Victor Indrizzo – drums
- Corky James – guitar, bass
- Buddy Judge – guitar, electric guitar, backing vocals
- Abe Laboriel Jr. – drums
- The Matrix – vocals
- Wendy Melvoin – bass, guitar
- Michael Penn – bass, guitar, backing vocals, sampling
- John Sands – drums
- David Sutton – bass
- R. Walt Vincent – bass, guitar, harmonica, electric guitar, backing vocals, Wurlitzer
- Patrick Warren – piano, keyboards
- The Wizardz of Oz – vocals
- Pete Yorn – guitar, drums

== Production ==
- Producers: the Matrix, Michael Penn, R. Walt Vincent
- Engineers: Doug Boehm, Ryan Freeland, the Matrix, Michael Penn, R. Walt Vincent, Howard Willing
- Assistant engineer: Kevin Meeker
- Mixing: Serban Ghenea, Tom Lord-Alge
- Mastering: Ted Jensen, Eddy Schreyer
- Assistant: Mike Glines, Andrew Nast
- Arranger: the Matrix
- Drum recordings: Krish Sharma
- Design: Eric Roinestad
- Art direction: Eric Roinestad
- Photography: Phil Poynter

== Charts ==
Chart performance for Liz Phair
Chart (2003)	Peak position
Australian Hitseekers Albums (ARIA)	18
Canadian Albums (Nielsen SoundScan)	67
US Billboard 200	27

== Certifications ==
Certifications for Liz Phair
Region	Certification	Certified units/sales
United States (RIAA)	Gold	500,000^{‡}
^{‡} Sales+streaming figures based on certification alone.
