= 6'1" =

Song by Liz Phair from Exile in Guyville

Song by Liz Phair

from the album Exile in Guyville
- Released: June 22, 1993
- Recorded: 1992–1993
- Studio: Idful Music Corporation, Chicago, Illinois
- Genre: Indie rock; lo-fi
- Label: Matador
- Songwriter: Liz Phair
- Producers: Liz Phair; Brad Wood

Live acoustic performance
- On MTV's 120 Minutes in 1994 on YouTube

6'1" (pronounced “six-feet-one”) is a song by American singer-songwriter Liz Phair from her debut studio album Exile in Guyville, released in June 1993. The song opens the album and has been widely noted by critics as a defining introduction to the record’s tone, lyrical perspective, and aesthetic, contributing to its long-term reputation within 1990s indie rock.

== Background ==
Exile in Guyville was recorded between 1992 and 1993 at Idful Music Corporation in Chicago, Illinois, and produced by Liz Phair and Brad Wood. The album was conceived in part as a loose, song-by-song response to the Rolling Stones’ 1972 album Exile on Main St., with Phair adopting its sequencing and thematic structure as a framework for exploring relationships, gender dynamics, and personal identity.

Within this concept, “6’1”” functions as the album’s opening counterpart to the Stones’ opener, establishing the confrontational and self-assertive tone that recurs throughout the record.

== Composition and lyrics ==
“6’1”” is built around a fast tempo, distorted guitar riff, and driving rhythm section characteristic of early 1990s lo-fi and indie rock. The song’s lyrics depict a narrator encountering a former romantic partner and asserting emotional growth and independence in the aftermath of the relationship. The repeated reference to standing “six-foot-one” rather than “five-foot-two” has been interpreted by critics as a metaphor for confidence and self-possession rather than a literal statement of height.

As the album opener, the song introduces a direct, confrontational lyrical style that contrasts with more introspective or subdued tracks later on the record. Critics have described “6’1”” as one of the album’s most energetic compositions, emphasizing its role in immediately establishing the album’s emotional and thematic stakes.

== Reception ==
Critical response to “6’1”” has generally been articulated within broader evaluations of Exile in Guyville, with several major music publications identifying the song as a defining album opener. In a review of the album’s 15th-anniversary reissue, Pitchfork highlighted “6’1”” as a standout track, describing it as an opening “salvo” that “runs up your spine,” and noting its combination of toughness, vulnerability, and a prominent guitar riff as emblematic of Liz Phair’s early work.

Retrospective commentary in Rolling Stone Australia emphasized the song’s energy and role in establishing the album’s impact, referring to the “caffeinated drive of songs like ‘6’1”’” as central to the record’s prominence and critical reputation within early 1990s alternative and indie rock.

In a track-by-track feature for Rolling Stone, Phair described the album’s opening songs as intentionally confrontational, situating “6’1”” within a broader effort to challenge male-dominated rock narratives through candid lyricism and perspective.

Although “6’1”” was not released as a commercial single and did not chart independently, its reputation has been reinforced by the sustained critical standing of Exile in Guyville. The album has appeared on numerous year-end and all-time lists compiled by major music magazines, including Spin, in which the strength of its opening track has been cited in retrospective assessments of its urgency and influence.

== Live performances and legacy ==
“6’1”” has remained a recurring part of Liz Phair’s live repertoire and has been performed during tours in which she has revisited Exile in Guyville in full. Reviews of concerts during the anniversary tour have noted the song’s continued impact when performed live, often serving as a set opener or early highlight.

== Credits and personnel ==
- Liz Phair – vocals, guitar, songwriting, production
- Brad Wood – production, instrumentation
