= Comeandgetit =

EP by Liz Phair
- Released: June 24, 2003
- Genre: Pop rock
- Length: 14:06
- Label: Capitol
- Producer: Liz Phair; Michael Penn

Liz Phair chronology
Liz Phair (2003)	Comeandgetit (2003)	Somebody's Miracle (2005)

Comeandgetit is the second EP released by the American singer-songwriter Liz Phair. It comprises five outtakes from her 2003 album Liz Phair. It was available as bonus material for those who purchased the album.

== Release ==
The CD-ROM portion of the Liz Phair CD contains links to the comeandgetit site where the tracks and cover art are available for download. The tracks are DRM protected, rendering them theoretically unrecordable. comeandgetit was available as a hard copy at select 2004 Liz Phair live shows after purchasing merchandise. Physical copies are still scarcely available. Additionally, in 2004, Capitol Records prepared a regular manufactured CD of the EP, with the same tracks, but different cover art. This CD was not intended for commercial sale, but instead for promotional distribution.

== Track listing ==
All tracks are written by Liz Phair. Tracks 1–3 produced and recorded by Michael Penn and mixed by Mike Shipley. Track 4 produced by Liz Phair, recorded by Doug Boehm, and mixed by Howard Willing. Track 5 is a demo and mixed by Mike Gilnes.

No.	Title	Length
1.	"Jeremy Engle"	3:07
2.	"Bouncer's Conversation"	3:20
3.	"Fine Again"	2:43
4.	"Hurricane Cindy"	2:20
5.	"Shallow Opportunities"	2:36
Total length:		14:06
