= Why Can't I? =

2003 single by Liz Phair

Single by Liz Phair

from the album Liz Phair
- B-side: "Jeremy Engle"; "Fine Again"
- Released: May 5, 2003
- Studio: Decoy (Studio City)
- Genre: Pop rock
- Length: 3:28
- Label: Capitol
- Songwriters: Lauren Christy; Scott Spock; Graham Edwards; Liz Phair
- Producer: The Matrix

Liz Phair singles chronology
| "Johnny Feelgood" (1998) | "Why Can't I?" (2003) | "Extraordinary" (2004) |

Music video
- "Why Can't I?" on YouTube

"Why Can't I?" is a song by American singer-songwriter Liz Phair. It was released on May 5, 2003, as the lead single from her self-titled fourth album. It reached number 32 on the US Billboard Hot 100, becoming Phair's highest-charting single and only top-40 single. The song was certified gold in the US, having sold 500,000 copies there.

== Writing and inspiration ==
"Why Can't I?" was written by Liz Phair and The Matrix. Phair released "Why Can't I?" in hopes that she would expand her audience and attract more listeners to its parent record, Liz Phair (2003). In an interview with Vice, Phair explained: "My hope was that someone would hear the song in the gym and buy the record and then start buying my albums and sort of have an awakening."

== Composition ==
"Why Can't I?" is written in the key of B major and has a tempo of 81 beats per minute. It follows a chord progression of B–B/A♯–G♯m7–E(add 2).

== Critical reception ==
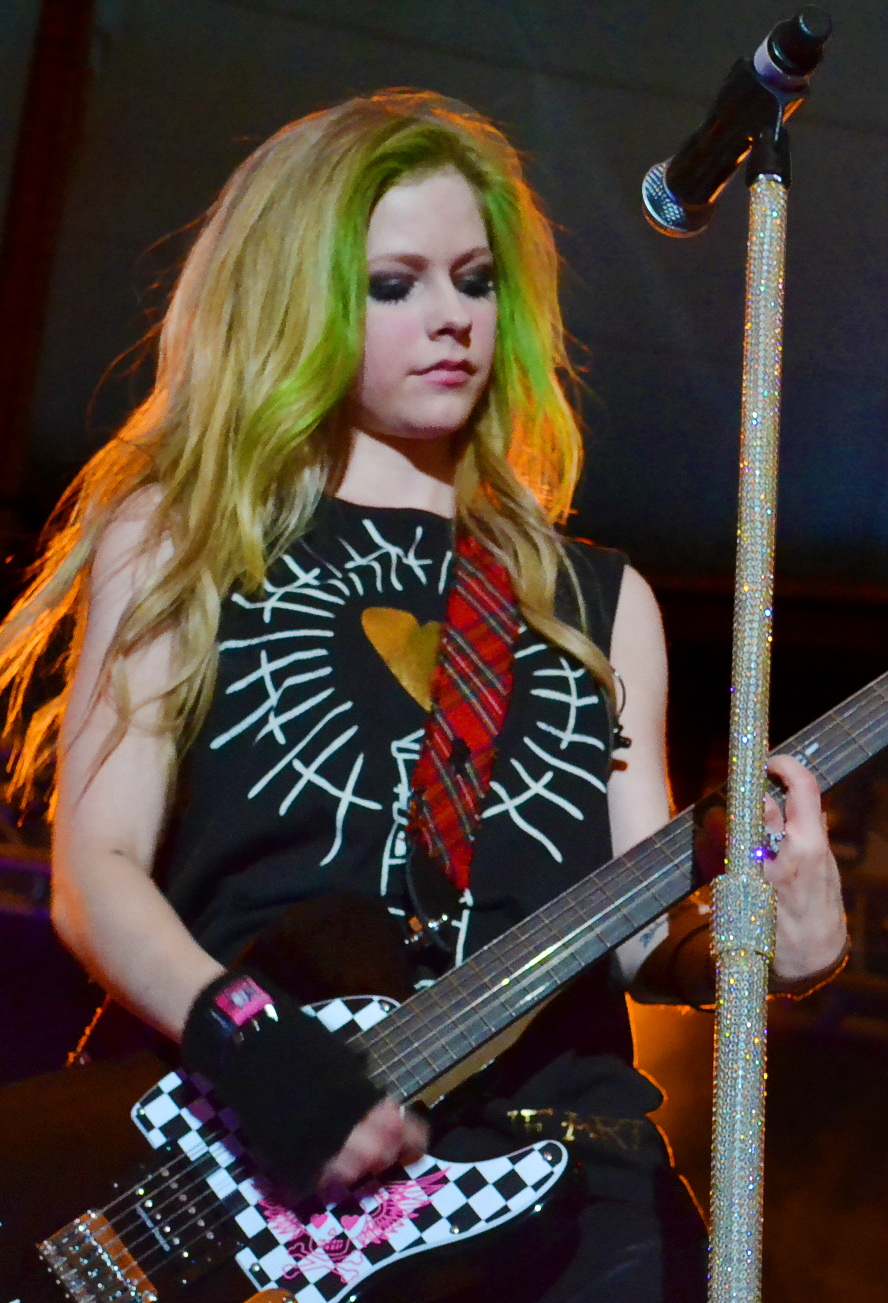
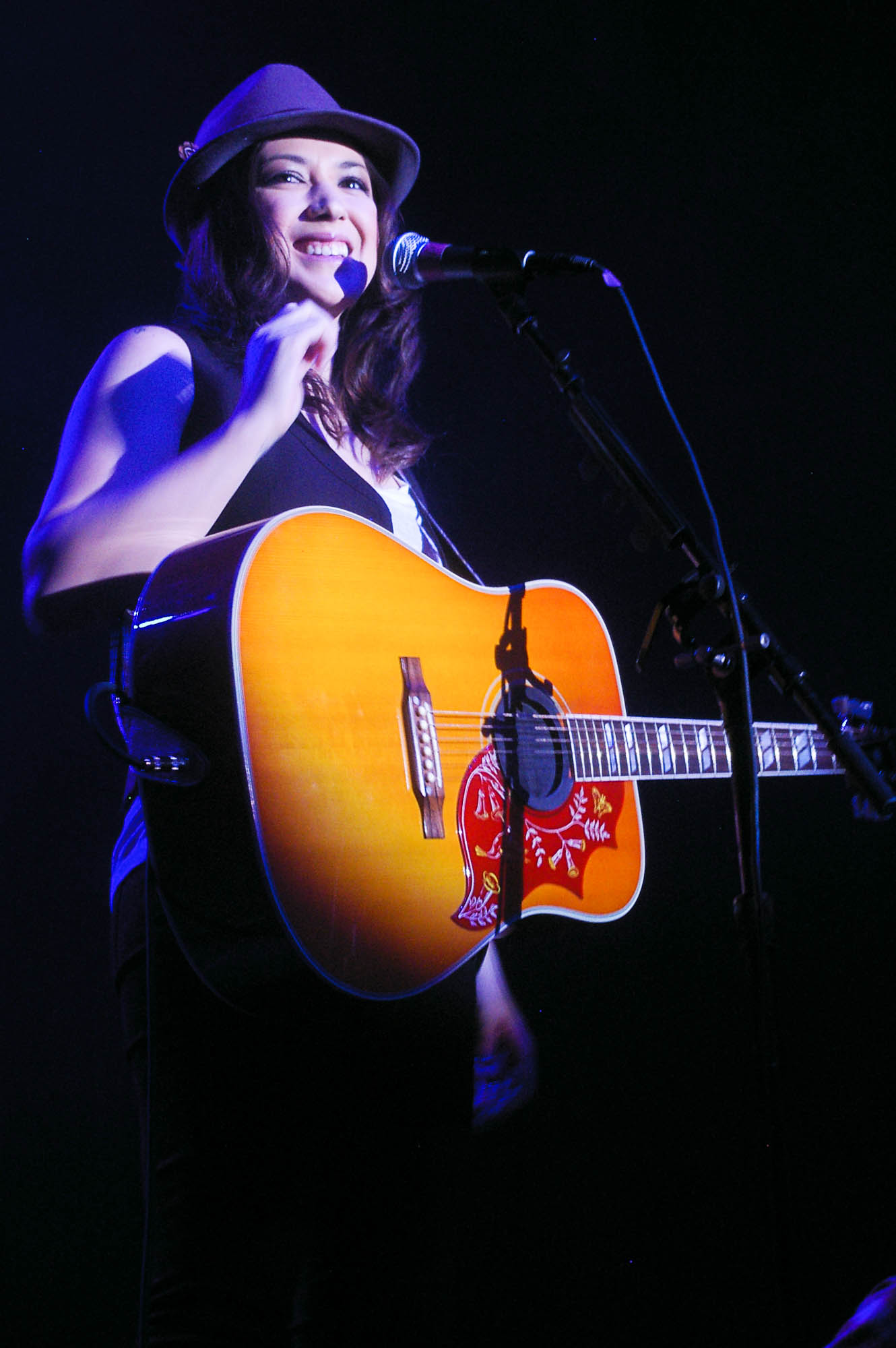
"Why Can't I?" was compared to songs by Avril Lavigne (left) and Michelle Branch (right).

Chuck Taylor of Billboard called the song a "melodic adult pop/rocker" and a "knock-out, stand-out, break-out record that adult top 40 should take right home." Matt LeMay of Pitchfork said that with the "cookie-cutter rock/pop background, it could easily pass for Michelle Branch." Mary Huhn of the New York Post called the song "a breathless romantic confection, and very un-Phair-like". Mim Udovitch of Slate called the song an "almost parodically basic power ballad" but stated that the chorus is "hooky".

Keith Phipps of The A.V. Club criticized the song, referring to it as "an embarrassingly awkward marriage of dumbed-down Phair songwriting and every tired production trick of the last year". Adrien Begrand of PopMatters compared the song to Avril Lavigne, referring to it as "a note-for-note retread of Lavigne's "Complicated".

== Music video ==
The video was directed by Phil Harder and was released in June 2003. It features a jukebox where an unknown man puts a coin in the jukebox where Liz Phair appears on every record cover on the jukebox indicating the song's lyrics.

== Track listing ==
- CD single
1. "Why Can't I?" – 3:28
2. "Jeremy Engle" – 3:10
3. "Fine Again" – 2:47

== Credits and personnel ==
Credits and personnel are adapted from the Liz Phair album liner notes.

- Liz Phair – writer, lead vocals
- The Matrix – writer, production, arrangement, recording, additional vocals
- Krish Sharma – drum recording
- Serban Ghenea – mixing
- Corky James – guitars
- Victor Indrizzo – drums
- Wizardz of Oz – additional vocals

== Charts ==
=== Weekly charts ===
| Chart (2003–2004) | Peak position |
|---|---|
| Belgium (Ultratip Bubbling Under Flanders) | 17 |
| Canada (Nielsen BDS) | 65 |
| New Zealand (Recorded Music NZ) | 37 |
| Quebec (ADISQ) | 50 |
| US Billboard Hot 100 | 32 |
| US Adult Pop Airplay (Billboard) | 7 |
| US Pop Airplay (Billboard) | 10 |

=== Year-end charts ===
| Chart (2003) | Position |
|---|---|
| US Adult Top 40 (Billboard) | 20 |
| US Mainstream Top 40 (Billboard) | 85 |

| Chart (2004) | Position |
|---|---|
| US Mainstream Top 40 (Billboard) | 79 |

== Certifications and sales ==
| Region | Certification | Certified units/sales |
|---|---|---|
| United States (RIAA) | Gold | 500,000^{*} |
^{*} Sales figures based on certification alone.

== Release history ==
| Region | Date | Format(s) | Label(s) | Ref. |
|---|---|---|---|---|
| United States | May 5, 2003 | Hot adult contemporary radio; triple A radio | Capitol | |
| United States | July 14, 2003 | Contemporary hit radio | Capitol | |
