= Never Said =

1993 single by Liz Phair

Single by Liz Phair

from the album Exile in Guyville
- Released: 1993
- Studio: Idful, Chicago, Illinois
- Genre: Indie rock
- Length: 3:16
- Label: Matador
- Songwriter: Liz Phair
- Producer: Brad Wood

Liz Phair singles chronology
| "Carnivore" (1993) | "Never Said" (1993) | "Stratford-on-Guy" (1994) |

Music video
- "Never Said" on YouTube

"Never Said" is a song by American singer-songwriter Liz Phair from her debut studio album Exile in Guyville (1993). It was released as the lead single from the album in 1993 by Matador Records.

== Writing and inspiration ==
"Never Said" was written collaboratively between Phair and Brad Wood. Phair intended to write a "big radio hit" for Exile in Guyville, stating that she believes the fifth song on an album's track listing is the most important song. The song was written as an answer song to The Rolling Stones's 1972 single "Tumbling Dice", with Phair commenting that she wanted to create a "female version" of the song. "Never Said" was originally written under the title "Clean" for Phair's GIRLSGIRLSGIRLS bootleg cassette. In an interview with Rolling Stone, Phair said that the concept of the song was developed through her observations of members from the alternative rock band Urge Overkill and how she can be just as "unaccountable". However, Phair has also stated that the song can more broadly relate to the music scene as a whole. She further explained the meaning of the song:

[This was] just kind of like about the music scene and how catty it was. People were always getting upset about something that someone had said about their band or whatever the latest gossip was. To me, I love the way that song is speaking in a rock shorthand. Like, “I ain’t done nothing wrong, I never said nothing.” There’s something insouciant and punk rock to just overtly speak in street language or street lingo or something. There’s just something that I always liked about that.

== Composition ==
Phair has described the song's lyrics as "about the music scene and how catty it was. People were always getting upset about something that someone had said about their band or whatever the latest gossip was", and given every song on Exile in Guyville is supposed to be a response to The Rolling Stones album Exile on Main St., "Never Said" was a parallel to "Tumbling Dice" in that "I could be just as unaccountable" in not saying certain things, just like men are regarding going out with as many women as possible.

== Airplay ==
"Never Said" received substantial play on college radio stations, and eventually went into rotation on mainstream alternative rock stations, including WTCX and WLOL.

== Music video ==
The official music video for "Never Said" was shot at Chicago's Garfield Park Conservatory by Katy Maguire. The video includes footage of Phair pretending to drown in the water and strolling through a greenhouse, an animated photo strip in which Phair is shown making funny faces, and two boys giggling in a dark room.

== Legacy ==
"Never Said" continues to be highly regarded by many critics. In a retrospective review of "Exile in Guyville," The New Yorker's Bill Wyman reflected that the song "contains one of Phair’s most enduring tricks, stirring in youthful, almost adolescent concerns to a very adult admixture, worked out over another set of enticing chord changes [....] The song’s not about truth or lies, and not whether you believe the character but whether, in the end, you understand that, lying or telling the truth, she’d probably say the same thing." PopMatters' Joe Vallese reflected that "Phair was aiming not high, but pointedly, wishing to prove herself capable and courageous to select naysayers in the Chicago indie scene." MTV commented that Phair "comes across like your cool big sister who's home from college and showing off her newfound grown-up skills."

In 2007, the song was listed as the 89th greatest song of the 1990s by VH1.

== Credits and personnel ==
Credits and personnel are adapted from the Exile in Guyville album liner notes.

- Liz Phair – writer, guitar, vocals
- Brad Wood – bass guitar, drums, producer
- Casey Rice – lead guitar
