= Whitechocolatespaceegg =

Studio album by Liz Phair
- Released: August 11, 1998
- Recorded: 1996–1998
- Studios: CRC (Chicago); Chicago Trax (Chicago); Louie's Clubhouse; Ocean Way (Hollywood); Velvet Shirt
- Genre: Indie rock
- Length: 51:10
- Labels: Matador; Capitol
- Producers: Jason Chasko; Scott Litt; Liz Phair; Brad Wood

Liz Phair chronology
Juvenilia (1995)	Whitechocolatespaceegg (1998)	Liz Phair (2003)

Singles from Whitechocolatespaceegg
- 1. "Polyester Bride" Released: 1998; 2. "Johnny Feelgood" Released: 1998

Professional ratings
Review scores
Source	Rating
AllMusic	3/5 stars
The Baltimore Sun	3.5/4 stars
Chicago Sun-Times	3.5/4 stars
Christgau's Consumer Guide	A
Entertainment Weekly	A−
The Guardian	2/5 stars
Los Angeles Times	4/4 stars
Pitchfork	6.4/10
Rolling Stone	4/5 stars
Spin	6/10

Whitechocolatespaceegg is the third studio album by American singer-songwriter Liz Phair, released in 1998. It peaked at number 35 on the Billboard 200. As of July 2010, the album had sold 293,000 copies. Unlike her previous two albums, with themes of sex and relationships, Whitechocolatespaceegg focused more on motherhood and family, as Phair had recently gotten married and given birth to a son.

== Reception ==
The album received generally positive reviews. Rolling Stone called it "engagingly intimate" while at the same time "playful and pop-y, with just enough dry humor". The magazine also praised the album for its storytelling-esque lyrics. The Washington Times wrote that Phair had successfully proved she was "no longer an unbridled twentysomething but now, at 31, a wife and mother, [who] has grown as an artist as well as a woman."

Billboard praised the album, noting "droll in her truth-telling, devastating in her offhand insights, and dazzling in her homespun rock dominion, Liz Phair is arguably the most original talent of the decade, as Whitechocolatespaceegg powerfully reaffirms. For track-to-track subtlety, poignant wit, and no- bullshit pronouncements that carry real poetic weight, Phair is the backstairs bard without peer...Phair is a truly affecting songmaker. Moreover, she can take the pop vernacular in all its jukebox/folk-pop/dancefloor familiarity and make it subversive again on superb material like "Uncle Alvarez," "Only Son," "Ride," and "What Makes You Happy."

== Track listing ==
All tracks are written by Liz Phair, except 1 (Phair, Jason Chasko, Doug Stoley), 2 (Phair, Chasko), and 7 (Phair, Scott Litt). Produced by Litt (3, 7, 9, 11, 12 14, 16), Phair (1, 2, 6, 15), Brad Wood (4, 5, 8, 10, 13), and Chasko (1, 2).

No.	Title	Length
1.	"White Chocolate Space Egg"	4:35
2.	"Big Tall Man"	3:49
3.	"Perfect World"	2:15
4.	"Johnny Feelgood"	3:22
5.	"Polyester Bride"	4:05
6.	"Love Is Nothing"	2:16
7.	"Baby Got Going"	2:02
8.	"Uncle Alvarez"	3:52
9.	"Only Son"	5:08
10.	"Go on Ahead"	2:53
11.	"Headache"	2:53
12.	"Ride"	3:04
13.	"What Makes You Happy"	3:36
14.	"Fantasize"	1:55
15.	"Shitloads of Money"	3:39
16.	"Girls' Room"	1:46
Total length:		51:10

Japan bonus track
No.	Title	Length
17.	"Hurricane Cindy"	2:54
Total length:		54:04

== Personnel ==
Musicians

- Liz Phair – guitar, piano, vocals
- Leroy Bach – acoustic bass
- Scott Bennett – organ, bass guitar, drums
- Bill Berry – bongos
- Peter Buck – guitar
- Jason Chasko – bass, guitar, piano, drums, background vocals
- Nathan December – guitar, electric guitar
- Tommy Furar – bass
- John Hiler – organ, piano, keyboards, background vocals
- Scott Litt – acoustic guitar, bass, harmonica, violin, drums, keyboards, background vocals
- Scott McCaughey – guitar
- Mike Mills – bass
- Troy Niedhart – accordion
- Ed Tinley – guitar, clapping
- Randy Wilson – keyboards
- Brad Wood – organ, bass, guitar, drums, keyboards, background vocals, clapping, drum machine

Production

- Producers: Liz Phair, Jason Chasko, Scott Litt, Brad Wood
- Engineers: John Hiler, Liquid Grooves, Chris Sabold, David Schiffman, Ed Tinley, Brad Wood
- Assistant engineers: Victor Janacua, Matt Judah, Brad Kopplin, Julie Last, Chris Sabold, Al Sanderson, David Schiffman
- Mixing: Victor Janacua, Tom Lord-Alge, Brad Wood
- Mastering: Ted Jensen, Katrin Thomas
- Programming: John Hiler, Randy Wilson
- Loops: Liquid Grooves
- Treatments: Scott Litt
- Art direction: Liz Phair, Frank Longo, Jon Mathias, Mark O.

== Charts ==
Chart (1998)	Peak position
US Billboard 200	35
Canada Albums Chart	69
