= Juvenilia (EP) =

EP by Liz Phair
- Released: August 8, 1995
- Genres: Indie rock; lo-fi
- Length: 27:58
- Label: Matador Records OLE 129

Liz Phair chronology
Whip-Smart (1994)	Juvenilia (1995)	Whitechocolate spaceegg (1998)

Professional ratings
Review scores
Source	Rating
AllMusic	3/5 stars
Robert Christgau	A−
The Encyclopedia of Popular Music	2/5 stars
Entertainment Weekly	B
Melody Maker	(mixed)
MusicHound Rock: The Essential Album Guide	2/5 stars

Juvenilia is an EP by American singer-songwriter Liz Phair, released in 1995. The EP is essentially a single for the song "Jealousy" from the album Whip-Smart, though this release includes a few songs recorded by Phair under her Girly-Sound moniker in 1991, namely "California," "South Dakota," "Batmobile," "Dead Shark," and "Easy."

The EP contains a cover of the song "Turning Japanese" by The Vapors and a previously unreleased original song, "Animal Girl."

== Reception ==
Cashbox awarded "Jealousy" their 'Pick of the Week', commenting that "for the third single from Phair’s 1994 release, Whip-Smart, she has taken off the kid gloves that marked her two previous "cute” singles. Against a pulsating backbeat, Phair snarls, “I ain’t believe you had a life before me 1 can’t believe they let you run around free.” This is the Phair that brought critics to orgasm and brought her critical praise as rock’s revolution when she released Exile In Guyville in 1993. And listening to that fiery passion it becomes clear exactly why."

In their review of the single, Billboard stated that "Phair's fury is unmistakable. The singer fires off an angry assault on her own jealous rage over a loud rumble of sputtering guitars and drums. The extra noise only adds to the atmosphere, as it brings out a determined spirit in the vocal."

== Track listing ==
All tracks are written by Liz Phair, except "Turning Japanese" (David Fenton).

No.	Title	Length
1.	"Jealousy"	3:37
2.	"Turning Japanese" (The Vapors cover)	3:38
3.	"Animal Girl"	3:57
4.	"California"	2:43
5.	"South Dakota"	2:18
6.	"Batmobile"	3:06
7.	"Dead Shark"	3:23
8.	"Easy"	3:11
Total length:		27:53

== Credits ==
- Liz Phair – vocals, guitar, piano
- Brad Wood – mixing
- Casey Rice – mixing
- Jim Ellison – performer
- Material Issue – performer
