= Evan Frankfort =

- Born: Christopher Jay Frankfort; December 13, 1970 (age 55)
- Genres: Television score, Music Production
- Occupations: Film composer, Music producer
- Instruments: Guitar, Drums
- Website: evanfrankfort.com

Evan Frankfort (born December 13, 1970) is an American composer and music producer. He has composed music for many shows and films including Rules of Engagement, Swingtown, In Plain Sight, and 90210. He is perhaps most well known for scoring The CW's The 100. Frankfort has also contributed to over 100 records, working with numerous artists, including Plain White T's, Liz Phair, Rancid, Flock of Seagulls, The Dollyrots, and many more.

Under the pseudonym Nihl Finch, Frankfort co-founded the independent music group Les Friction. He is also the frontman for rock band The Spiritual Machines, sharing vocal duties with bassist/keyboardist Future Aaron and James Grundler.

As Head of Music at Hearst Media Production Group, Frankfort serves as musical director and composer on the company's suite of educational/informational programming, including shows like Wildlife Nation and Mutual of Omaha’s Wild Kingdom: Protecting the Wild. Frankfort received a Daytime Emmy nomination in 2022 for Wildlife Nation, and another one in 2024 for Wild Kingdom.

== Work 1990 – present ==
- Mutual of Omaha’s Wild Kingdom: Protecting the Wild (2023) – Composer
- Harlem Globetrotters: Play it Forward (2022) – Composer
- Wildlife Nation (2021) – Composer
- Lucky Dog (2013) – Composer
- The 100 (TV series) (2014) – Composer
- In Plain Sight (2012) – Composer
- Rules of Engagement – Composer
- State of Georgia (2011) – Composer
- The Pee-wee Herman Show (2011) – Music producer
- The Beautiful Life: TBL (2009) – Composer
- Swingtown (2008) – Composer
- 90210 – Composer
- Les Friction – Louder Than Words (2012) – Vocalist, Composer

== Awards ==
In 1996, Frankfort won a Daytime Emmy Award for his musical contributions to Guiding Light, under the name Christopher Jay.
