= Whip-Smart =

Studio album by Liz Phair
- Released: September 20, 1994
- Recorded: August 1993; February 1994
- Studios: Idful Music Corporation, Chicago, Illinois; Compass Point, Nassau, Bahamas
- Genre: Indie rock
- Length: 42:02
- Labels: Matador; Atlantic
- Producers: Liz Phair; Brad Wood

Liz Phair chronology
Exile in Guyville (1993)	Whip-Smart (1994)	Juvenilia (1995)

Singles from Whip-Smart
- 1. "Supernova" Released: July 23, 1994; 2. "Whip-Smart" Released: February 15, 1995; 3. "Jealousy" Released: August 8, 1995

Whip-Smart is the second studio album by American singer-songwriter Liz Phair, released in 1994, the follow-up to Phair's critically acclaimed debut, 1993's Exile in Guyville. Despite not being as critically well received as her previous record, Whip-Smart debuted at No. 27 on the Billboard 200 and ultimately achieved gold status. As of July 2010, it had sold 412,000 copies.

At the time of its release Whip-Smart received generally favorable reviews from music critics, figuring inside end of year lists, including those by the Los Angeles Times and Q Magazine. The album was ranked sixth for its year inside The Village Voice Pazz and Jop Poll. Although obscured by its famous predecessor, the album has gained more recognition with time and is largely considered a key record to Phair's legacy as an artist, along with her other two Matador Records releases and the Girly-Sound tapes. In 2003, the German version of Rolling Stone magazine placed the record at 95 on its list of greatest records since Autumn of 1994. In 2014, Rolling Stone named Whip-Smart the 18th greatest album of its year – considered by the magazine the peak of mainstream alternative rock.

Phair was featured on the cover of Rolling Stone on the week Whip-Smart was released, and by 1994 and 1995, she made a frequent number of television appearances, including the Late Show with David Letterman, The Tonight Show with Jay Leno and MTV's 120 Minutes.

In 1995, "Supernova" was nominated for Best Female Rock Vocal Performance in the 37th Annual Grammy Awards.

== Background ==
After the success of Exile in Guyville, expectations ran high for Liz Phair's sophomore release. Phair's debut album had sold over 200,000 units by the spring of 1994 and was Matador's most successful release so far. The success of Exile in Guyville prompted many major labels to seek a distribution deal with Matador, most saliently Atlantic Records, which would form Phair's next album deal.

As a result, Whip-Smart was one of the most anticipated albums of the year. Danny Goldberg, then-president of Atlantic Records, predicted that the record would "hit gold quickly", and both Rolling Stone and Spin were interested in featuring Phair on their covers.

== Recording ==
Phair described Whip-Smart as particularly difficult to make because at the time she didn't have many songs that weren't about the music industry, which displeased her manager. In fact, a substantial number of tracks on the final album (namely, "Chopsticks", "Shane", "Go West", "Whip-Smart", and parts of "Jealousy", previously known as "Thrax") were songs already written in 1991, when Phair recorded under the Girly-Sound moniker.

In total, Whip-Smart took about one month to record. The album was recorded in two distinct sessions: the first in August 1993 in Chicago, and the second in February 1994 in the Bahamas.

Guitarist Casey Rice described the initial sessions at Idful Studios in Chicago as subject to many distractions, such as "the phone ringing, people dropping by the studio, and so on". Phair wanted to move recording to New York City, but due to financial constraints, the band ended up continuing with Compass Point Studios in Nassau, Bahamas instead.

The same team that worked on Guyville worked again on what would become Whip-Smart. The album was recorded and mixed by Brad Wood, with the assistance of Casey Rice. Wood characterized the recording process as very much spontaneous, saying that "[Liz would] bring in a song and we'd record the whole thing that day. I'd have to write a drum and bass part right on the spot." There was, however, pressure to improve on the sound of the previous record, to meet the expectations of Phair's newly formed fanbase.

Liz Phair has described Whip-Smart as a chronicle of the beginning, middle and end of a relationship: "a rock fairy tale, from meeting the guy, falling for him, getting him and not getting him, going through the disillusionment period, saying 'Fuck it,' and leaving, coming back to it." Phair also described the sound of the album as more confident and playful – and less frustrated, tense, and sexual – than Exile in Guyville.

Phair is credited, along with Matador Records' in-house art designer Mark Ohe, with the album's art and layout. The cover image incorporates a Soviet propaganda poster. The inner liner notes feature a series of Polaroid photographs taken by Phair herself.

== Reception ==
Professional ratings
Review scores
Source	Rating
AllMusic	3.5/5 stars
Chicago Sun-Times	4/4 stars
Chicago Tribune	3/4 stars
Entertainment Weekly	B
Los Angeles Times	4/4 stars
NME	6/10
Q	3/5 stars
Rolling Stone	4/5 stars
The Rolling Stone Album Guide	3/5 stars
USA Today	3/4 stars

Critical reception was generally favorable. Richie Unterberger of AllMusic states that "if there are flaws in this generally first-rate follow-up, they mostly arise in comparison with Guyville, a record of such unexpected impact that most anything Phair could have done may have been found lacking" and that "there's no question that Phair is a major songwriter and artist, but this album is more a solidification of her talents than a breakthrough statement."

Billboard praised the album, stating "leave it to the phenomenal Phair to pull off the seemingly impossible. Her keenly awaited follow-up to last year's college crowd essential Exile In Guyville packs all of that album's rough-hewn charms into a more pulled together package that exudes new confidence, yet still oozes a basement - session bent and those sharp talking edges. The result is plain stunning, cementing Phair's place as a songwriter for the '90s and assuring her an even wider audience."

Cashbox awarded the album their 'Pick of the Week' with the reviewer commenting that "this must have been how people 20 years ago felt listening to Bruce Springsteen's early works. It's not so much how great Liz Phair is now, as the awesome idea of how brilliant she's likely to become... Whip-Smart is, quite simply, a stunning work from an artist that should have all music lovers in ecstasy at her arrival on the scene."

== Charts ==
Whip-Smart debuted at No. 27 on the Billboard 200 and spent 17 weeks on the charts. The lead single "Supernova" received somewhat heavy rotation on radio stations and the music video was aired on MTV. The song went on to hit No. 6 on the Modern Rock Tracks chart and No. 78 on the Billboard Hot 100.

However, despite its early success, Whip-Smart quickly departed the charts. Even though the second single and title track "Whip-Smart" was also successful, it failed to capture the same amount of attention of "Supernova", and by the time the third single "Jealousy" was released, the interest in the album was much smaller. Besides this, Phair canceled her tour shortly after the album was released, causing Atlantic's legal department to send her several letters demanding her to tour or risk defaulting on her contract. Phair stated, "Basically they wanted me to be public, I wanted to be private. All these people wanted me to be really big and I felt like this tiny pea in the center of all this chaos. I didn't want this success. I kept thinking this is wrong. Why do all these people want it so much more than I do?"

According to a Billboard article, Whip-Smart has sold 412,000 copies in the US based on SoundScan sales, and is certified gold by the RIAA. As of July 2003, the album had sold 600,000 globally, making it her most commercially successful album.

== Track listing ==
All tracks are written by Liz Phair, except "Whip-Smart" (Phair, chorus by Malcolm McLaren).

No.	Title	Length
1.	"Chopsticks"	2:05
2.	"Supernova"	2:48
3.	"Support System"	2:58
4.	"X-Ray Man"	2:13
5.	"Shane"	4:12
6.	"Nashville"	4:42
7.	"Go West"	3:17
8.	"Cinco de Mayo"	2:43
9.	"Dogs of L.A."	2:21
10.	"Whip-Smart"	4:18
11.	"Jealousy"	3:37
12.	"Crater Lake"	2:06
13.	"Alice Springs"	1:50
14.	"May Queen"	2:42
Total length:		42:02

- "Whip-Smart" interpolates "Double Dutch" by Malcolm McLaren, written by Malcolm McLaren.

== Personnel ==
Credits are adapted from the album's liner notes.

- Liz Phair – vocals; guitar, (all tracks except "Chopsticks"), piano ("Chopsticks," "May Queen"), synthesizer ("Shane"); artwork design
- Brad Wood – synthesizer ("Support System," "Nashville," and "Whip-Smart"), bass (all tracks except "Chopsticks," "Supernova," "X-Ray Man," "Nashville," "Dogs of L.A.," "Alice Springs"), guitar ("Whip-Smart"), c. western guitar ("May Queen"), percussion ("Supernova," "X-Ray Man," and "Shane"), drums (all tracks except "Chopsticks," "Shane," and "Alice Springs"), saxophone ("Nashville"), backing vocals ("Support System," "X-Ray Man," "Nashville," "Cinco de Mayo," "Whip-Smart," "Crater Lake"), recording, production, engineering, and mixing
- Casey Rice – talking guitar lines and guitar solo ("Supernova"), lead guitar ("Cinco de Mayo"), acoustic guitar ("X-Ray Man"), rum chimes ("Nashville"), mixing and recording
- Leroy Bach – bass ("Supernova," "X-Ray Man")
- John Henderson – distorted guitar ("Chopsticks")
- Mark O – artwork design
- Roger Seibel – mastering

== Charts ==
Chart (1994)	Peak position
US Billboard 200	27
US Cash Box Top 200	30
Canada Albums Chart	35

== Certifications ==
Organization	Level
RIAA – U.S.	Gold
