= Somebody's Miracle =

Studio album by Liz Phair
- Released: October 4, 2005
- Studios: Henson Recording Studios (Hollywood, California); The Village Recording Studios (Santa Monica, California)
- Genre: Pop rock
- Length: 58:11
- Label: Capitol
- Producers: John Alagia; John Shanks; Dino Meneghin; Joe Zook

Liz Phair chronology
Comeandgetit (2003)	Somebody's Miracle (2005)	Funstyle (2010)

Singles from Somebody's Miracle
- 1. "Everything to Me" Released: August 1, 2005

Somebody's Miracle is the fifth studio album by Liz Phair, released on October 4, 2005 (see 2005 in music) on Capitol Records. From September 2004 through April 2005, she composed 14 tracks spanning from lo-fi guitar-driven to high-gloss produced tracks. Much like her debut album, Exile in Guyville, Somebody's Miracle was originally modeled after another canonical album, Songs in the Key of Life by Stevie Wonder, though only elements of this exist in the final product. The first single, "Everything to Me" was released to radio on August 1, 2005. Somebody's Miracle debuted at number 46 on the Billboard 200, and has sold over 83,000 copies in the U.S.

== Album information ==
The album features a somewhat softer side of Phair, with themes of innocence, loss, and love. Many critics and fans accused Phair of having lost her edge. Phair responded to backlash by saying, "If you are an old fan and it doesn't fit what you need, don't buy the disc."

== Release and promotion ==
Prior to the album's release, Phair embarked on an acoustic tour in the summer of 2005 in which she previewed the album's material. The tour, which had nine stops, commenced on July 26 in Boston, Massachusetts, and concluded on August 19 in San Francisco, California. To further promote the album, Phair headlined a month-long North American tour. The tour commenced on October 6 in Fort Lauderdale, Florida and concluded on November 16 in San Diego, California.

Phair also performed the album's title track on the Charmed episode "Battle of the Hexes". She was also the last artist to perform on the show.

== Reception ==
Professional ratings
Aggregate scores
Source	Rating
Metacritic	54/100
Review scores
Source	Rating
AllMusic	3/5 stars
Blender	4/5 stars
Entertainment Weekly	B−
Los Angeles Times	2.5/4 stars
Pitchfork	2.0/10
PopMatters	4/10
Rolling Stone	2/5 stars
Slant	2/5 stars
Stylus	B+
Under the Radar	5/10

The album has a score of 54 out of 100 on Metacritic, indicating "mixed or average reviews". One critic wrote, "Miracle contains the singer's most winning melodies to date, not to mention her most confident vocals." MSNBC wrote that in comparison to her 2003 self-titled album, Somebody's Miracle was "less blatantly commercial, but still smooth, reflecting her increasing shift toward a clearer sound". Rolling Stone, however, gave the album just two stars, calling her vocals "thin and dry" and the album as a whole "plain and forgettable". The A.V. Club wrote that Phair "has grown into the role of an MOR songstress."

This was Liz Phair's last album for Capitol Records. Her next album, Funstyle, was released on the independent label Rocket Science Records.

== Track listing ==
All tracks are written by Liz Phair, except 6, 8, and 14 (Phair, John Shanks). Produced by John Alagía (1–5, 7, 9–13), Dino Meneghin and Joe Zook (2, 9), and John Shanks (6, 8, 14).

No.	Title	Length
1.	"Leap of Innocence"	4:22
2.	"Wind and the Mountain"	5:33
3.	"Stars and Planets"	3:54
4.	"Somebody's Miracle"	4:23
5.	"Got My Own Thing"	4:34
6.	"Count on My Love"	3:41
7.	"Lazy Dreamer"	4:55
8.	"Everything to Me"	3:19
9.	"Closer to You"	3:37
10.	"Table for One"	4:12
11.	"Why I Lie"	3:21
12.	"Lost Tonight"	4:02
13.	"Everything (Between Us)"	4:34
14.	"Giving It All to You"	3:44
Total length:		58:11

Somebody's Miracle – Japanese edition (bonus track)
No.	Title	Length
15.	"Can't Get Out of What I'm Into"	2:51
Total length:		61:03

== Personnel ==
Credits are adapted from the album's liner notes.

Production

- Liz Phair – writer
- John Alagía – producer, mixing, additional production, background vocal arrangement
- Brian Scheuble – engineering, mixing, recording
- Jeff Robinette – assistant engineer, additional engineering
- Dino Meneghin – producer
- Joe Zook – co-producer, engineering, recording
- John Shanks – writer, producer, mixing
- Jeff Rothschild – recording, mixing
- Lars Fox – additional engineering
- Shari Sutcliffe – contractor/project coordinator
- David Campbell – strings arrangement
- Allen Sides – strings recording
- Joel Derouin – concert master
- Tom Lord-Alge – mixing
- Ted Jensen – mastering
- Mary Fagot – creative direction
- Eric Roinestad – art direction, design
- Dusan Reljin – photography

Instruments

- Liz Phair – vocals, guitar, background vocals
- Dino Meneghin – electric guitar, acoustic guitar, lap steel guitar, keyboards, guitar, drum programming, hand percussion
- Aaron Sterling – drums, percussion
- Oliver Kraus – cello
- Tim Bradshaw – keyboards
- Sean Hurley – bass
- John Alagía – guitar, keyboards, B3 organ
- Bill Mohler – bass, acoustic bass
- John Shanks – bass, guitar, keyboards, background vocals
- Jeff Rothschild – drums
- Joe Zook – tambourine

== Charts ==
Weekly chart performance for Somebody's Miracle
Chart (2005)	Peak position
US Billboard 200	46

=== Singles ===
Chart performance for singles from Somebody's Miracle
Year	Single	Chart	Position
2005	"Everything to Me"	US Adult Top 40	27
2005	"Everything to Me"	US Pop 100	99

== Release history ==
Release formats for Somebody's Miracle
Region	Date	Edition(s)	Format(s)	Label	Ref.
United States	October 4, 2005	Standard	CD; digital download	Capitol	
