= Supernova (Liz Phair song) =

1994 single by Liz Phair

Single by Liz Phair

from the album Whip-Smart
- B-side: "Combo Platter"
- Released: 23 July 1994
- Studio: Idful (Chicago, Illinois); Compass Point (Nassau, Bahamas)
- Length: 2:48
- Label: Matador
- Songwriter: Liz Phair
- Producers: Liz Phair; Brad Wood

Liz Phair singles chronology
"Stratford-on-Guy" (1993)	"Supernova" (1994)	"Whip-Smart" (1994)

Music video
- "Supernova" on YouTube

"Supernova" is a song by American singer-songwriter Liz Phair from her second album, Whip-Smart, released in 1994. The song received heavy rotation on radio stations and its music video was frequently aired on MTV. The song went on to hit number 6 on the Modern Rock Tracks chart and number 78 on the Billboard Hot 100. In 1995, the song was nominated for Best Female Rock Vocal Performance at the 37th Annual Grammy Awards, losing to "Come to My Window" by Melissa Etheridge.

== Background ==
Phair said, "I wanted to just kind of write about the joy of being in love and having sex be a part of that. ... I'm so awestruck by the fact that my body, which has evolved over millions of years, has these responses and it's all wrapped up with the emotions that I'm feeling. I wanted to describe every level of that in a song."

== Reception ==
In their review of the single, Billboard commented that "it's time for this alternative rock darling to make the transition into pop stardom. Fuzzy, guitar-rooted ditty bounces with a pure-pop hook, saucy lyrics, and layered vocals that sound like a cute girl group gone mad."

== Track listings ==
- Australian and German single
1. "Supernova" (Album Version) – 2:50
2. "Supernova" (Clean Version) – 2:49
3. "Combo Platter" (Girlie Sound) – 4:48
- German cassette
1. "Supernova" (LP Version) – 2:47
2. "X-Ray Man" (Remix) – 2:30
- US 7-inch vinyl and cassette
1. "Supernova" (Album Version) – 2:49
2. "Combo Platter" (Girlysound) – 4:48
- US single
1. "Supernova" (Edit) – 2:50
2. "Supernova" (Clean Version) – 2:49
3. "Combo Platter" (Girlie Sound) – 4:48

== Personnel ==
Personnel are adapted from the Whip-Smart album liner notes.

- Liz Phair – vocals, guitar, songwriting, direction
- Brad Wood – drums, percussion, recording, mixing
- Casey Rice – talking guitar lines, guitar solo, recording, mixing
- Leroy Bach – bass
- Roger Seibel – mastering

== Charts ==
Chart (1994–1995)	Peak position
Australia (ARIA)	43
Canada Top Singles (RPM)	59
US Billboard Hot 100	78
US Alternative Airplay (Billboard)	6
US Cash Box Top 100	81
