= Liz Phair =

American singer-songwriter (born 1967)

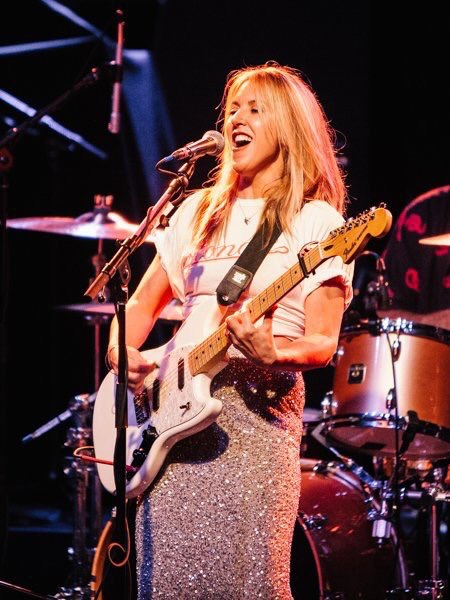
- Phair performing live in 2018

Background information
- Also known as: Girly-Sound
- Born: Elizabeth Clark Phair; April 17, 1967 (age 59); New Haven, Connecticut, U.S.
- Origin: Chicago, Illinois, U.S.
- Genres: Indie rock; lo-fi; pop rock
- Occupations: Singer-songwriter; musician
- Instruments: Vocals; guitar; piano
- Years active: 1990–present
- Labels: Warner Chappell; Chrysalis; Matador; Rocket Science; ATO; Capitol; PAX AM
- Website: www.lizphairmusic.com

Elizabeth Clark Phair (born April 17, 1967) is an American singer-songwriter and musician. Born in New Haven, Connecticut, Phair was raised primarily in the Chicago area. After graduating from Oberlin College in 1990, she attempted to start a musical career in San Francisco; however, she returned to her home in Chicago, where she began self-releasing audio cassettes under the name Girly-Sound. The tapes led to a recording contract with the independent record label Matador Records.

Phair's 1993 debut studio album, Exile in Guyville, was released to acclaim; it has been ranked by Rolling Stone as one of the 500 Greatest Albums of All Time. Phair followed this with her second album, Whip-Smart (1994), which earned her a Grammy Award nomination for Best Female Rock Vocal Performance, and Whitechocolatespaceegg (1998). Ten years after the release of her debut, Phair's fourth album, Liz Phair (2003), released on Capitol Records, moved towards pop rock, earning her a mainstream audience but alienating critics; the single "Why Can't I?" peaked at number 32 on the Billboard Hot 100.

After the release of her fifth album, Somebody's Miracle (2005), Phair left Capitol and released her sixth album Funstyle independently in 2010. In 2018, it was announced that Matador Records would be releasing a retrospective set for Phair's debut album Exile in Guyville, which includes remastered recordings from her original Girly Sound demo tapes. Phair released her seventh studio album, Soberish, in 2021. As of 2026, Phair has sold over 5 million records worldwide.

== Early life ==
Phair was born in New Haven, Connecticut, on April 17, 1967. She was adopted at birth by Nancy, a historian and museologist, and John Phair, later an AIDS researcher and head of infectious diseases at Northwestern Memorial Hospital; her mother later worked as a professor at the Art Institute of Chicago. She has one older brother, also adopted. On being adopted, Phair has said: "My parents were very responsible ... They were perfect about it ... I've never tried to find [my biological] parents. My friend who was adopted from the same home requested information and got back a four-page letter about her (the friend's) mother's life. She said it was jaw-dropping." Phair was raised as a Christian.

Phair spent her early life in Cincinnati until age 9 when her family rmoved to the Chicago suburb of Winnetka, Illinois. She graduated from New Trier High School in 1985. During high school, Phair was involved in student government and the cross country team, and took AP Studio Art her senior year, among other advanced-level classes. She attended Oberlin College in Oberlin, Ohio, where she graduated in 1990 with a B.A. in art history.

== Career ==
=== 1990–1992: Girly Sound tapes ===
Phair's entry into the music industry began when she met guitarist Chris Brokaw, a member of the band Come. Brokaw was dating one of Phair's friends, and stayed at their loft in SoMa one weekend. After living in San Francisco for a year, Phair went broke and returned to Illinois, moving back in to her family's home. There, she began writing lyrics and playing guitar, recording songs on a four-track tape recorder in her bedroom. She used the name Girly-Sound on these recordings. She became part of the alternative music scene in Chicago and became friends with Material Issue and Urge Overkill, two of Chicago's upstart bands to go national in the early 1990s, as well as Brad Wood and John Henderson, head of Feel Good All Over, an independent label in Chicago.

=== 1992–2003: Exile in Guyville; critical recognition ===
After asking Wood what the "coolest" indie label was, Phair called up Gerard Cosloy, co-president of Matador Records, in 1992 and she asked him if he would put out her record. Coincidentally, Cosloy had just read a review of Girly Sound in Chemical Imbalance that very day and told Phair to send him a tape. Phair sent him a tape of six Girly Sound songs. Cosloy recalls: "The songs were amazing. It was a fairly primitive recording, especially compared to the resulting album. The songs were really smart, really funny, and really harrowing, sometimes all at the same time. ... I liked it a lot and played it for everybody else. We usually don't sign people we haven't met, or heard other records by, or seen as performers. But I had a hunch, and I called her back and said O.K."

Cosloy offered a $3,000 advance, and Phair began working on a single, which turned into the 18 songs of Exile in Guyville.

Exile in Guyville was produced by Phair and Brad Wood, and released in 1993. The album received uniformly excellent reviews. The album received significant critical acclaim for its blunt, honest lyrics and for the music itself, a hybrid of indie rock and lo-fi, and established Phair's penchant for exploring sexually explicit lyrics. By contrast, her trademark low, vibrato-less monotone voice gave many of her songs a slightly detached, almost deadpan character.

The release of Phair's second album received substantial media attention and an advertising blitz. Whip-Smart debuted at No. 27 in 1994 and "Supernova," the first single, became a Top 10 modern rock hit, and the video was frequently featured on MTV. Phair also landed the cover of Rolling Stone with the headline "A Rock Star Is Born." The album received positive reviews, although not as acclaimed as the debut, but was certified Gold (shipments of at least 500,000 units). It ultimately did not sell as well as expected, as it was hoped the album would introduce Phair to a wider, more mainstream audience. Following Whip-Smart, Phair released Juvenilia, a collection of some early Girly Sound tracks and several B-sides, including her cover of the 1980 song by The Vapors, "Turning Japanese."

In 1994, Phair made several live television and radio appearances in an effort to promote Exile in Guyville and Whip-Smart; she appeared on Late Show with David Letterman performing "Never Said" and "Supernova", and on The Tonight Show with Jay Leno performing an acoustic version of "Whip-Smart". She also performed "Alice Springs" live on Good Morning America.

She also appeared on the MTV alternative rock show 120 Minutes performing "Never Said", "6'1"", "Cinco de Mayo" and "Supernova" live at various times during 1994 and early 1995.

Phair's third album, Whitechocolatespaceegg, was released in 1998 after some delays, which included a disagreement about content; at one point, Matador rejected the album as submitted, and asked Phair to write a few additional radio-friendly songs for the set. The album displayed a more mature Phair, and reflected some of the ways marriage and motherhood affected her. While the single "Polyester Bride" received some airplay, and the album received many positive reviews, it was no more successful commercially than her previous records. To promote the record, Phair joined Lilith Fair. Phair performed on the main stage along with acts like Sarah McLachlan, Emmylou Harris, Sheryl Crow and Missy Elliott. She also opened for Alanis Morissette on her 1999 Junkie Tour.

Phair portrayed the role of office manager Brynn Allen opposite Robin Tunney in the 2002 film Cherish.

=== 2003–2007: Liz Phair and Somebody's Miracle ===
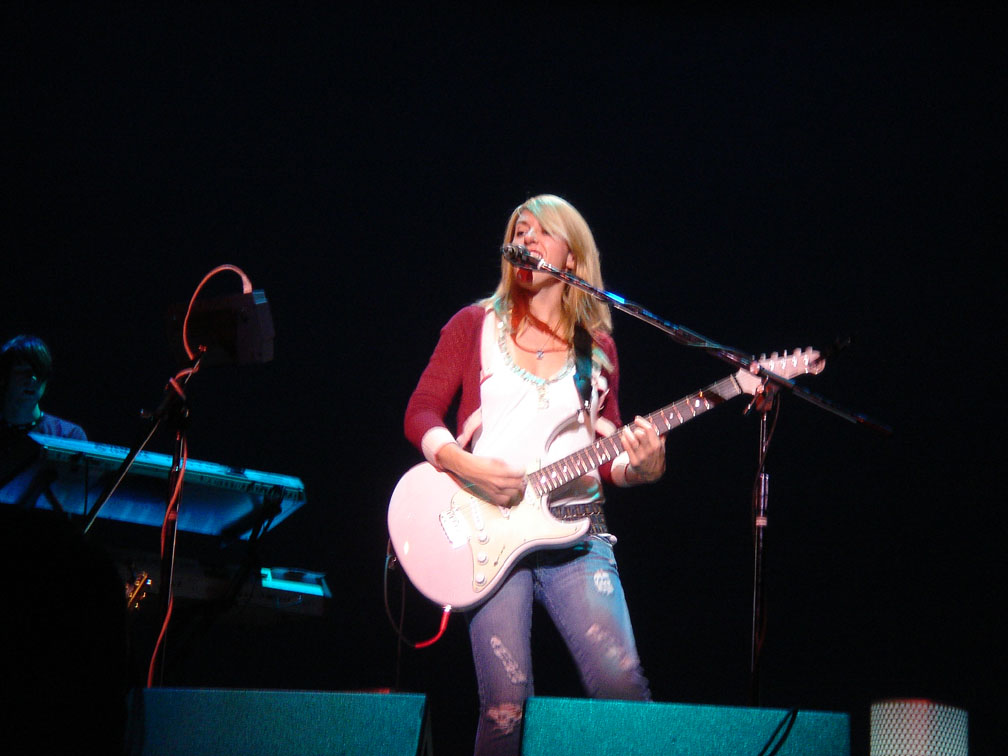
Phair in concert, October 26, 2005

Phair provided backing vocals on the 2003 Sheryl Crow single "Soak Up the Sun". In 2003, Phair released her self-titled fourth album on her new label, Capitol Records. It departed from Phair's earlier lo-fi sound for more polished pop production and songwriting. Phair said she wanted to earn more money from her work, and hired the Matrix, who had produced songs by pop acts including Avril Lavigne, to create some songs, including the singles "Extraordinary" and "Why Can't I?" Liz Phair debuted at No. 27 on the Billboard 200. "Why Can't I?" entered the Adult Top 40 and Hot Adult Contemporary charts, and its music video placed Phair in heavy rotation on VH1 for the first time. It received mixed reviews, including negative reviews from the New York Times and Pitchfork, which accused Phair of selling out and mimicking younger artists. In 2019, the Pitchfork critic Matt LeMay apologized for his review, saying he had failed to appreciate Phair's willingness to "try on different masks".

Somebody's Miracle, Phair's fifth album and final with Capitol Records, was released in 2005. It returned to a rock sound. The album received mixed reviews, with Amy Phillips of Pitchfork writing: "Now this is a terrible Liz Phair record. Somebody's Miracle is mostly generic pap that any number of next-big-has-beens could have cranked out, a useless piece of plastic poking a pointy heel in the eye of the carcass of the artist Liz once was." Phillips also suggested it was worse than her largely critically derided previous album. A review published by MSNBC found the album "less blatantly commercial [than her previous], but still smooth, reflecting her increasing shift toward a clearer sound".

In 2006, she performed one of her songs at the end of an episode of TV series Charmed (season 8, episode 8).

=== 2008–2009: television composing ===
Phair signed with Dave Matthews' label ATO Records in early 2008 and re-released Exile in Guyville on June 24, 2008, on CD, vinyl, and in digital format, featuring three songs from the original recording sessions, "Ant in Alaska," "Say You," and an untitled instrumental, and also a documentary DVD, "Guyville Redux." "

In May 2009, Phair released a new song, "Faith and Tenderness," sold exclusively at Banana Republic on a compilation disc featuring other artists. Also in 2009, Phair began working as a television composer, following an invitation by her childhood friend Mike Kelley to score the show he was creating for CBS, Swingtown, given it was based on the life in their hometown. For the task, Phair decided to bring in Doc Dauer, producer of a children's album about bodily functions, The Body Rocks, where Phair performed after being brought in by Pete Yorn, and Dauer's creative partner Evan Frankfort. She followed it by creating the theme song for NBC's The Weber Show, and working for the CW's The 100, the USA Network show In Plain Sight and the CW reboot of 90210, for which she won the 2009 ASCAP award for Top Television Composer.

=== 2010–2015: Funstyle ===
On July 3, 2010, Phair's official website announced a surprise link to download her new album Funstyle, which she released independently after parting ways with Capitol Records and ATO. The song "Bollywood" was available to stream from the site for a limited time, before Phair took it down.

A note from Phair to her fans posted on her official website explained why the songs were problematic:

How to Like It.

You were never supposed to hear these songs. These songs lost me my management, my record deal and a lot of nights of sleep.

Yes, I rapped one of them. Im as surprised as you are. But here is the thing you need to know about these songs and the ones coming next: These are all me. Love them, or hate them, but dont mistake them for anything other than an entirely personal, un-tethered-from-the-machine, free for all view of the world, refracted through my own crazy lens.

This is my journey. Ill keep sending you postcards.

— Liz

Phair revealed in an interview with the Wall Street Journal that the falling out with her record label, ATO, occurred after a change in management. She explained, "The people who were still there didn't like, or didn't know what to do with, the music I was making, so we just stalled out and I asked to leave."

Phair went on tour to promote the album, playing many songs from Guyville and Whip-Smart, along with songs from the rest of her repertoire. The Funstyle Tour ran from October 2010 to March 2011. The tour's last show took place at the SXSW festival in Austin, Texas.

In 2012, she co-wrote and performed the song "Dotted Line" with A.R. Rahman for the film People Like Us. "The song 'Dotted Line' I wrote with A. R. Rahman for Alex Kurtzman's film Welcome to People," she said in an interview. "Both amazing. Welcome to People is a truly powerful film. Very proud of being part of it."

The dystopian holiday song "Ho Ho Ho" was released by Phair in late 2014. In 2014, Capitol released a greatest hits compilation of Phair's work titled Icon.

=== 2016–present: Guyville retrospective, Soberish and recent tours ===
In spring of 2016, Phair performed as the opening act for The Smashing Pumpkins on their In Plainsong tour.

In late 2015 and mid-2016, Phair stated on her Twitter that she intended to release two albums by the end of 2016. It was confirmed via Twitter that Phair was working on a double album, produced by fellow singer-songwriter Ryan Adams in his PAX-AM recording studio. Phair's project with Adams did not proceed. When multiple women publicly disclosed accusations of abuse against Adams in 2019, a Twitter user asked Phair for a comment about Adams, to which she replied, "My experience was nowhere near as personally involving, but yes the record ended and the similarities are upsetting."

In 2018, it was announced that Phair's former label, Matador, would be releasing a 25th-anniversary retrospective set for her debut album, Exile in Guyville. The set, titled Girly Sound to Guyville, included remasters of Phair's 1991 demo tapes recorded under the moniker Girly-Sound from the original sources, and was released May 4, 2018. In support of this retrospective, Phair embarked on two North American tours — the Girly Sound to Guyville Tour and the Amps on the Lawn Tour. Phair continued to tour through the summer of 2019.

In April 2019, Phair announced on Instagram that she had been working on new studio material with Brad Wood, who produced Exile in Guyville, Whip-Smart, and parts of whitechocolatespaceegg. On October 8, 2019, Phair shared "Good Side," a song from these sessions. Her seventh album, Soberish, with Wood as producer, was announced for release in 2021.

In April 2020, the release of a cover version of "Hanging on the Telephone" by Phair with former friend and collaborator Jim Ellison of Material Issue was announced. Recorded before Ellison's death in 1996, the song, originally released by The Nerves in 1976 and acovered by Blondie, was to be released along with a documentary titled Out of Time: The Material Issue Story. Phair and Ellison previously teamed in the 1990s on covers of "Turning Japanese" and "The Tra La La Song (One Banana, Two Banana)".

In February 2021, Phair announced she had signed a contract with newly re-formed Chrysalis Records to issue her album Soberish later in the year. The album was released that June, produced by Brad Wood. It garnered some of Phair's strongest reviews since Guyville. Pitchfork called the album "a solid, sharply written record of sturdy, enjoyable songs that gradually unfold to reveal new depths of feeling." In Rolling Stone, Jon Dolan wrote that Soberish "brings to mind the glory of Guyville and its 1994 follow-up, Whip-Smart, without feeling at all like self-conscious recapitulation." A review by El Hunt in the NME stated that "Soberish serves as a reminder of Liz Phair's brilliance after years of underestimation. Far from simply drawing on her most critically acclaimed albums, it draws on the whole lot, and finds newness within."

Phair was due to tour later in 2021 as part of Alanis Morissette's rescheduled 2020 tour, but canceled for undisclosed reasons. She toured in the fall of 2023 for the 30th anniversary of Exile in Guyville, where she performed the album in its entirety alongside several other fan favorites.

In August 2024, Phair officially announced a publishing deal with Warner Chappell Music.

In September 2026, Phair co-headlined a 10-show tour with Sleater-Kinney, titled The Flannel and The Fury Tour. The title references 1990s alternative rock culture and the early riot grrrl scene.

== Personal life ==
In 1994, Phair began dating film editor Jim Staskauskas. The couple married on March 11, 1995; their son was born in December 1996.

In 2001, Phair and Staskauskas divorced, after which Phair sold her home in Chicago's Lincoln Park and moved to Los Angeles. As of 2018, Phair resides in Manhattan Beach, California.

She identifies as a feminist, and Exile in Guyville has been said to capture "the voice of third-wave feminism."

== Books ==
An April 2018 profile by Billboard revealed that Phair had signed a two-book publishing deal with Random House. Horror Stories, the first of two planned memoirs, saw release on October 8, 2019. Reviews of Horror Stories were generally favorable with several reviewers noting Phair's skills as a writer and her stark honesty in the book.

Her second memoir will be called Fairy Tales.

== Discography ==
- Exile in Guyville (1993)
- Whip-Smart (1994)
- Whitechocolatespaceegg (1998)
- Liz Phair (2003)
- Somebody's Miracle (2005)
- Funstyle (2010)
- Soberish (2021)

== Awards ==
Year	Award	Category	Work	Result
1993	Spin's Readers' Poll Awards	Album of the Year	Exile in Guyville	Won
1995	Grammy Awards	Best Female Rock Vocal Performance	"Supernova"	Nominated
1996	Grammy Awards	Best Female Rock Vocal Performance	"Don't Have Time"	Nominated
1999	Online Music Awards	Best Alternative Fansite	—N/a	Nominated
2003	BDSCertified Spin Awards	100,000 Spins	"Why Can't I?"	Won
2004	Groovevolt Music and Fashion Awards	Best Rock Album - Female	Liz Phair	Nominated
2005	BMI Pop Awards	Most Performed Work	"Why Can't I?"	Won
2005	ASCAP Pop Music Awards	Most Performed Work	"Why Can't I?"	Won
2009	ASCAP Pop Music Awards	Top Television Composer	"90210"	Won
2014	ASCAP Pop Music Awards	Top Television Composer	"Super Fun Night"	Won
2018	Rober Awards Music Poll	Best Reissue	Girly-Sound to Guyville	Nominated
2019	A2IM Libera Awards	Best Reissue	Girly-Sound to Guyville	Nominated

== See also ==
- List of Oberlin College and Conservatory people

== Works cited ==
- Bogdanov, Vladimir; Erlewine, Stephen Thomas; Woodstra, Chris (2002). All Music Guide to Rock: The Definitive Guide to Rock, Pop, and Soul. Hal Leonard Corporation/Backbeat Books. ISBN 978-0-87930-653-3. OCLC 47823606.
- Havranek, Carrie (2009). Women Icons of Popular Music. Greenwood Press. ISBN 978-0-313-34085-7.
- LaBlanc, Michael L. (1995). Contemporary Musicians: Profiles of the People in Music. Vol. 14. Gale. ISBN 978-0-810-35738-9.
