= Exile in Guyville =

Studio album by Liz Phair
- Released: June 22, 1993
- Recorded: 1992–1993
- Studios: Idful Music Corporation, Chicago, Illinois, US
- Genres: Indie rock; lo-fi
- Length: 55:51
- Label: Matador
- Producers: Liz Phair; Brad Wood

Liz Phair chronology
Girly-Sound (1991)	Exile in Guyville (1993)	Whip-Smart (1994)

Singles from Exile in Guyville
- 1. "Never Said" Released: 1993; 2. "Stratford-on-Guy" Released: 1993

Exile in Guyville is the debut studio album by the American singer-songwriter Liz Phair, released on June 22, 1993, by Matador Records. It was recorded at Idful Music Corporation in Chicago between 1992 and 1993 and produced by Phair and Brad Wood.

Exile in Guyville was certified gold in 1998. Rolling Stone included it in all three of its lists of the "500 Greatest Albums of All Time", and it was named among the best albums of the 1990s by Pitchfork and Robert Christgau.

== Background ==
In the summer of 1991, Phair wrote and recorded songs on audio cassette tapes, which she circulated in Chicago using the moniker Girly-Sound. Initially, she sent out only two tapes, one to Tae Won Yu from the band Kicking Giant, and the other to Chris Brokaw of the bands Come and Codeine. The recipients of the Girly-Sound tapes circulated copies with other early fans.

=== Packaging ===
In 2008, Phair stated the cover was originally "an orgy of Barbies floating in a pool", a concept that Matador rejected, stating that such artwork would not sell. The final cover design is a photo of Phair topless in a photo booth, taken and cropped by Nash Kato of Urge Overkill. The interior artwork is based on that of Lopez Tejera's 1952 album The Joys and Sorrows of Andalusia. The booklet also features a collage of several Polaroid photos of Phair, Wood, guitarist Casey Rice (and various other people), with a paraphrase from lines from the movie Dirty Harry.

== Meaning ==
The term Guyville comes from a song of the same name by Urge Overkill. Liz Phair explained the concept of the album in a Billboard article, stating that "For me, Guyville is a concept that combines the smalltown mentality of a 500-person Knawbone, KY.-type town with the Wicker Park indie music scene in Chicago, plus the isolation of every place I've lived in, from Cincinnati to Winnetka". When asked during an interview with Noah Adams on his radio show All Things Considered about the concept, she elaborated: "It was a state of mind and / or neighborhood that I was living in. Guyville, because it was definitely their sensibilities that held the aesthetic, you know what I mean? It was sort of guy things - comic books with really disfigured, screwed-up people in them, this sort of like constant love of social aberration. You know what I mean? This kind of guy mentality, you know, where men are men and women are learning." Asked about what she sees in Guyville, Phair said that "All the guys have short, cropped hair, John Lennon glasses, flannel shirts, unpretentiously worn, not as a grunge statement. Work boots."

Phair has also stated that most songs on the album were not about her. She commented, "That stuff didn't happen to me, and that's what made writing it interesting. I wasn't connecting with my friends. I wasn't connecting with relationships. I was in love with people who couldn't care less about me. I was yearning to be part of a scene. I was in a posing kind of mode, yearning to have things happen for me that weren't happening. So I wanted to make it seem real and convincing. I wrote the whole album for a couple people to see and know me."

Phair commented in interviews that the album was a song-by-song reply to the Rolling Stones' 1972 album Exile on Main St. Some critics contend that the album is not a clear or obvious song-by-song response, although Phair sequenced her compositions in an attempt to match the songlist and pacing of the Rolling Stones album.

== Reception ==
Professional ratings
Review scores
Source	Rating
AllMusic	5/5 stars
Blender	5/5 stars
Chicago Sun-Times	4/4 stars
Christgau's Consumer Guide	A
Entertainment Weekly	A
Los Angeles Times	3.5/4 stars
Pitchfork	9.6/10 (2008); 10/10 (2018)
Rolling Stone	4/5 stars
The Rolling Stone Album Guide	4/5 stars
Spin	4.5/5 stars

Exile in Guyville received universal acclaim. It was the No. 1 album in the year-end critics poll in Spin and the Village Voice Pazz & Jop critics poll.

It was also a moderate commercial success. The videos for "Never Said" and "Stratford-On-Guy" received airplay on MTV. By mid-1994, it had sold over 200,000 copies, reaching number 196 on the Billboard 200, and was Matador's most successful release at the time. In 1998, it was certified gold.

Phair said: "I don't really get what happened with Guyville. It was so normal, from my side of things. It was nothing remarkable, other than the fact that I'd completed a big project, but I'd done that before... Being emotionally forthright was the most radical thing I did. And that was taken to mean something bigger in terms of women's roles in society and women's roles in music... I just wanted people who thought I was not worth talking to, to listen to me." The sudden success of the album also generated a somewhat negative response from Chicago's indie music scene. Phair commented, "It's odd... Guyville was such a part of indie. But at the same time... I was kind of at war with indie when I made that record." Another problem that arose from her success was also dealing with her stage fright.

Spin named Exile in Guyvile the 15th-greatest album released between 1985 and 2005. In 2001, VH1 named it the 96th-greatest album of all time. Rolling Stone ranked it number 328 in its 2003 list of "The 500 Greatest Albums of All Time", 327 in its 2012 list, and number 56 in its 2020 list. In 1999, Pitchfork named it the fifth-best album of the 1990s, and the 30th-best in its 2003 list. Robert Christgau named it among the 10 best albums of the 1990s.

In 2013, The New Yorker's Bill Wyman named Exile in Guyville "patently one of the strongest rock albums ever made" and "arguably the quintessential example" of indie rock. PopMatters' David Chiu wrote that Exile lay bedroom pop music's groundwork. He noted that several indie bands and musicians had gained their "musical DNA" from the record, such as Frankie Cosmos and Jay Som.

=== Accolades ===
Accolades for Exile in Guyville
Publication	List	Rank	Ref.
NME	Albums of The Year: 1993	19	
Pazz & Jop	1993 Pazz & Jop Critics Poll	1	
Paste	The Best Albums of The 1990s	41	
Pitchfork	The Best Albums of The 1990s	4	
Pitchfork	The 100 Best Indie Rock Albums of All Time	2	
Rolling Stone	The Greatest Concept Albums of All Time	6	
Rolling Stone	The Best Albums of the 1990s	20	
Rolling Stone	The Greatest Albums of All Time	56	
Slant	The Best Albums of 1993	4	
Spin	The Best Albums of 1993	1	

== Reissues ==
=== 15th Anniversary Edition (2008) ===
In 2008, Phair signed to ATO Records and released a 15th-anniversary reissue of Exile in Guyville on June 14. It includes three previously unreleased tracks ("Ant in Alaska", a cover of Lynn Taitt's "Say You" and an instrumental listed on the disc as "Standing") and a DVD documentary.

=== Girly-Sound to Guyville (2018) ===
On May 4, 2018, Matador reissued Exile in Guyville for its 25th anniversary. There was a remastered reissue on CD, 2LP & digital (18 files), but also a box set titled Girly-Sound to Guyville consisting of the original album remastered and Phair's three Girly-Sound demo tapes, available as a 3-CD set and as a 7-LP box set including a download coupon for 56 files. Moreover, the three original tapes were also reissued on cassette and digital. This marked the first time that the full set of demo tapes had been officially released. Absent from the reissue are the two Girly-Sound demos "Shatter" and "Fuck or Die", as Phair was unable to get clearance for samples used in the songs.

On June 22, 2023, Phair released an outtake from the album titled "Miss Lucy". The song was intended to appear on the album; however, it was ultimately replaced with "Flower".

== Track listing ==
All tracks are written by Liz Phair.

No.	Title	Length
1.	"6'1""	3:06
2.	"Help Me, Mary"	2:16
3.	"Glory"	1:29
4.	"Dance of the Seven Veils"	2:29
5.	"Never Said"	3:16
6.	"Soap Star Joe"	2:44
7.	"Explain It to Me"	3:11
8.	"Canary"	3:19
9.	"Mesmerizing"	3:55
10.	"Fuck and Run"	3:07
11.	"Girls! Girls! Girls!"	2:20
12.	"Divorce Song"	3:20
13.	"Shatter"	5:28
14.	"Flower"	2:03
15.	"Johnny Sunshine"	3:27
16.	"Gunshy"	3:15
17.	"Stratford-on-Guy"	2:59
18.	"Strange Loop?"	3:56
Total length:		55:51

== Personnel ==
As per the liner notes of the 2008 reissue:

- Liz Phair – guitar, vocals, piano ("Canary"), hand claps ("Mesmerizing")
- Casey Rice – lead guitar ("Mesmerizing", "Divorce Song"), cymbal ("Shatter"), background vocals, hand clapping ("Mesmerizing")
- Brad Wood – bass and drums (various songs), organ ("Glory", "Mesmerizing"), synthesizer, ("Explain It to Me"), percussion, bongos ("Explain It to Me"), tambourine and shaker ("6′1""), maracas and hand claps ("Mesmerizing"), background vocals, vocals ("Say You"), drones and feedback ("Shatter"), "sick guitar" ("Gunshy"), guitar ("Say You")
- Tony Marlotti – bass ("Johnny Sunshine", "Say You"), vocals ("Say You")
- John Casey – harmonica ("Soap Star Joe", "Divorce Song")
- Tutti Jackson – backing vocals ("Soap Star Joe")

== Charts ==
Chart performance for Exile in Guyville
Chart	Peak position
US Heatseekers Albums (Billboard)	12
US Billboard 200	196
US Cash Box Top 200	63
Scottish Albums (Official Charts)	92
UK Independent Albums (Official Charts)	21
UK Album Sales (OCC)	87

== Certifications ==
Certifications for Exile in Guyville
Region	Certification	Certified units/sales
United States (RIAA)	Gold	500,000^{^}
^{^} Shipments figures based on certification alone.

== Release history ==
Release formats for Exile in Guyville
Region	Date	Edition(s)	Format(s)	Label	Ref.
United States	May 17, 1993	Standard	CD; LP; cassette	Matador	
United States	June 24, 2008	Deluxe	CD+DVD; LP; Download	ATO	
Various	May 4, 2018	Standard; deluxe	CD; LP; download	Matador	
