= Greenlaw (surname) =

Greenlaw is a surname of Scottish origin which means "a green hill." Notable people with the surname include:

- Dre Greenlaw (born 1997), American football player
- Edwin Greenlaw (1874–1931), American scholar and educator
- Frank Howard Greenlaw, Canadian politician
- Jeff Greenlaw (born 1968), Canadian ice hockey player
- Lavinia Greenlaw (born 1962), English poet and writer
- Linda Greenlaw (born 1960), American writer

Fictional characters:

- Delphi Greenlaw, character in the soap opera Shortland Street
