= Dominic Thompson =

Dominic Thompson may refer to:

- Dominic Thompson (Shortland Street)
- Dominic Thompson (footballer)
