= Sea Patrol =

Australian television series

- Genre: Crime drama Adventure
- Created by: Hal and Di McElroy
- Directed by: Chris Martin-Jones; Geoff Bennett
- Starring: Kirsty Lee Allan; John Batchelor; Saskia Burmeister; Conrad Coleby; Matthew Holmes; Danielle Horvat; Josh Lawson; David Lyons; Lisa McCune; Nikolai Nikolaeff; Jay Ryan; Kristian Schmid; Ian Stenlake; Jeremy Lindsay Taylor; Dominic Deutscher
- Composer: Les Gock
- Country of origin: Australia
- Original language: English
- No. of series: 5
- No. of episodes: 68 (list of episodes)

Production
- Executive producers: Hal McElroy; Di McElroy; Jo Horsburgh
- Producer: Julie Forster
- Production locations: Queensland; New South Wales
- Editors: Marcus D'Arcy; Antonio Mestres; Robert Gibson; Nicholas Holmes
- Camera setup: Single camera
- Running time: 42 minutes
- Production company: McElroy All Media

Original release
- Network: Nine Network
- Release: 5 July 2007 – 12 July 2011

2008 Sea Patrol cast

Sea Patrol is an Australian television drama that ran from 2007 to 2011, set on board HMAS Hammersley, a fictional patrol boat of the Royal Australian Navy (RAN). The series focused on the ship and the lives of its crew members.

Despite similarities in setting and content, this series is not a follow-on to the 1979 series Patrol Boat. At the start of the second season, Sea Patrol saw an upgrade from the Fremantle class to a newer Armidale-class boat.

The first season debuted on 5 July 2007 on the Nine Network, who invested $15 million into the programme. The second season of Sea Patrol, titled Sea Patrol II: The Coup, aired in 2008, while the third season, Sea Patrol: Red Gold, aired in 2009. The fourth season aired in 2010 in a new 16-episode format, with no main theme or continuous storyline running throughout, unlike the first three seasons.

The fifth season of Sea Patrol, "Damage Control", began airing in 2011 and consisted of 13 episodes. The Nine Network confirmed that this was to be the final season, due to reliance on government rebates that expire after 65 episodes. Completion of season five brought the total episode count to 68 episodes.

== Premise ==
All seasons of Sea Patrol have consisted of standalone episodes dealing with serious breaches of Australian law, such as illegal fishing, asylum seekers and other problems the RAN encounter on typical patrols. The premiere of each season usually introduces a larger event which is expanded on and connected as the season goes on, before being resolved in the finale. This format, however, with a storyline running throughout the season, was absent in season 4.

The first season's premiere began with the introduction of Bright Island, which was positioned as a type of mystery island, and the death of a marine biologist. Over the duration of the season, the CO and some of the crew became suspicious and later entwined in a conspiracy involving water containing a deadly toxin.

The second season, known as Sea Patrol II: The Coup, revolved around insurgents on the fictional Samaru Islands attempting to overthrow the current government, and a group of Eastern European mercenaries and smugglers who near-fatally stabbed Charge, tried to kill XO and are in cahoots with the insurgents and Samaruan constabulary.

The third season, known as Sea Patrol III: Red Gold, began with the death of Josh "ET" Holiday, fiancé of Nicole "Nikki" (Nav) Caetano and a crew member of HMAS Hammersley during the first two seasons. The investigation of this death ran throughout the season.

The fourth season, known as Sea Patrol IV: The Right Stuff, returned with most principal cast members, with the exception of Pete "Buffer" Tomaszewski, Nicole "Nikki" (Nav) Caetano, Billy "Spider" Webb and Commander Steven 'Steve' Marshall.

The fifth season, known as Sea Patrol V: Damage Control, was the final season and began with a suicide bombing in an overseas bar.

== Cast and characters ==
=== Main cast ===
Actor	Character	Rank	Position	Tenure	Episodes
Ian Stenlake	Mike "CO" Flynn, CSC, RAN	Lieutenant Commander	Commanding officer	Season 1–3	001–068
Ian Stenlake	Mike "CO" Flynn, CSC, RAN	Commander	Commanding officer	Season 4–5	001–068
Lisa McCune	Kate "XO" McGregor, RAN	Lieutenant	Executive officer	Season 1–5	001–068
John Batchelor	Andy "Charge" Thorpe	Chief petty officer	Chief Marine Technician	Season 1–5	001–068
Matthew Holmes	Chris "Swain" Blake, CV	Petty officer	Coxswain/Medic	Season 1–5	001–068
Kristian Schmid	Robert "RO" Dixon	Leading Seaman	Radio operator	Season 1–5	001–068
Saskia Burmeister	Nicole (Nikki) "Nav" Caetano, RAN	Lieutenant	Navigator	Season 1–3	001–039
Jeremy Lindsay Taylor	Pete "Buffer" Tomaszewski	Petty Officer	Boatswain	Season 1–3	001–039
Jay Ryan	Billy "Spider" Webb	Seaman	Boatswain's Mate	Season 1–3	001–039
David Lyons	Josh "ET" Holiday	Leading seaman	Electronics Technician	Season 1–3	001–027
Josh Lawson	Toby "Chefo" Jones	Able seaman	Chef/Assistant Medic	Season 1	001–013
Kirsty Lee Allan	Rebecca "Bomber" Brown	Able seaman	Chef/Assistant Medic	Season 2–4	014–055
Nikolai Nikolaeff	Leo "2Dads" Kosov-Meyer	Leading seaman	Electronics Technician	Season 3–5	028–068
Conrad Coleby	Dylan "Dutchy" Mulholland, MG	Petty officer	Boatswain	Season 4–5	040–068
Danielle Horvat	Jessica "Gap Girl" Bird	Seaman	Gap Year later Chef/Assistant Medic	Season 4–5	040–068
Dominic Deutscher	Ryan White	Midshipman	Junior officer	Season 4–5	053–068

=== Recurring cast ===
Actor	Character	Tenure
Daisy Betts	Sally Blake	5 episodes
Steve Bisley	Commander Steven 'Steve' Marshall	Season 1–3
Sibylla Budd	Dr. Ursula Morrell	Season 1
Goran D. Kleut	Vjek	Season 2
Dajana Cahill	Carly Walsman	Season 2
Robert Coleby	Lang Calwell	Season 3
Alan Dale	Ray Walsman	Season 2
Ditch Davey	Captain Jim Roth, CV	Season 2, 5
Tye Harper	Seaman John 'Jaff' Jaffah	Season 1
Eugene Gilfedder	Finn McLean	Season 2
Mirko Grillini	Emile / Malcom 'Mal' Scarpia	Season 3, 5
Jerome Ehlers	Peter	Season 4
Steve Bastoni	Steve Coburn	Season 4
Ray Tiernan	Zhenya	Season 2
James Stewart	Zan	Season 2
Sean Taylor	Wessel Berkelman	Season 4
Renai Caruso	Madelaine Cruise	Season 5
Martin Lynes	Richard 'Rick' Gallagher	Season 1
Anthony Edwards	Viktor	Season 2
Tim Campbell	Harry Edwards	Season 4
Tammy MacIntosh	Commander Maxine "Knocker" White	Season 4, 5
Blair McDonough	Matt Robsenn	Season 3
Andrew Buchanan	Campbell Fulton	Season 2, 3
Geoff Morrell	Lieutenant Commander Jack Freeman	Season 2
Jessica Napier	Simone Robsenn	Season 3
Damien Garvey	Carl Davies/Sgt Wild	Season 1, 5
Graham Moore	Warrant Officer Ed Gray/Technician/Agent Smith	Season 3, 4, and 5
Morgan O'Neill	Lieutenant Darryl Smith	Season 1
Christopher Stollery	Federal Agent Gregory 'Greg' Murphy	Season 1
Yvonne Strahovski	Federal Agent Martina Royce	Season 1
Pearl Tan	Federal Agent Alicia Turnball	Season 1
Renai Caruso	Madeleine Cruise	Season 5, 6 episodes
Jessica Napier	Simone Robsen	Season 3, 5 episodes

=== Guests ===
Actor	Character	Tenure
Anna Hutchison	Jodie	1 episode
Benjamin McNair	Richard Logan	1 episode
Bob Morley	Sean	1 episode
Brett Swain	Carl Buckland	1 episode
Brooke Harman	Jessica Taylor	1 episode
Clayton Watson	Fraser	1 episode
Geoff Morrell	Lieutenant Commander Jack Freeman	1 episode
Jack Finsterer	Karl Butherworth	1 episode
Jerome Ehlers	Peter	1 episode
John Brumpton	Malachi	1 episode
Jonny Pasvolsky	Clarkson	1 episode
Ling-Hsueh Tang	Xiao-Xiao	2 episodes
Matthew Le Nevez	Jullian Wiseman	1 episode
Michael Dorman	Travis	1 episode
Nicholas Bell	Jack	1 episode
Osamah Sami	Salim Shokor	1 episode
Rel Hunt	Captain Craig Bolt	1 episode
Ryan Johnson	Darryl	1 episode
Steve Bastoni	Steve Coburn	1 episode
Steve Le Marquand	Karl Strauss	1 episode
Sullivan Stapleton	Geoff Kershaw	1 episode
Tasma Walton	Jila	1 episode
Tim Campbell	Harry Edwards	1 episode

== Production ==
=== Origins ===
"Every hour of every day in all weathers young men and women of the Royal Australian Navy Patrol Boat Service battle the elements and the odds to defend Australia's borders and enforce its economic zone. They provide security, support, and relief for the world's largest island". Each episode of Sea Patrol, from the third season begins with the words "Honour – Honesty – Courage – Integrity – Loyalty", which are the Royal Australian Navy Values.

This series shows the gender and cultural diversity of the Navy, and deals with contemporary issues such as illegal fishing, boat people, drug-running, immigration, and people-smuggling, and have an underlying mystery that runs throughout the series.

=== Ships ===
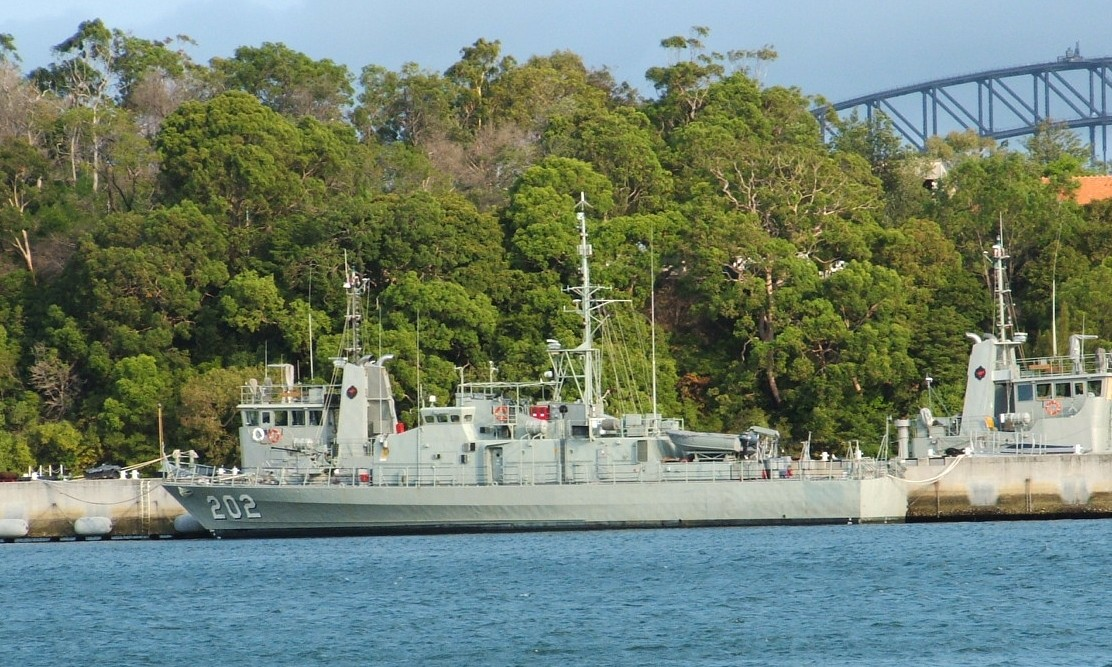
The fictional HMAS Hammersley at HMAS Waterhen naval base. Portraying vessel is unknown.

For the first season of Sea Patrol, the fictional HMAS Hammersley (PTF 202) was portrayed by two real Fremantle-class patrol boats: HMAS Wollongong was used for filming in Sydney, while HMAS Ipswich was used for six weeks of filming off Dunk Island in Queensland. Hammersley serves under the fictional naval command structure of "NAVCOM", and was decommissioned during the final episode of the first season. HMAS Kingston (PTF 205), a second fictional Fremantle-class boat, is mentioned in several episodes and appears in the ninth episode: Kingston shares her pennant number with real patrol boat HMAS Townsville.

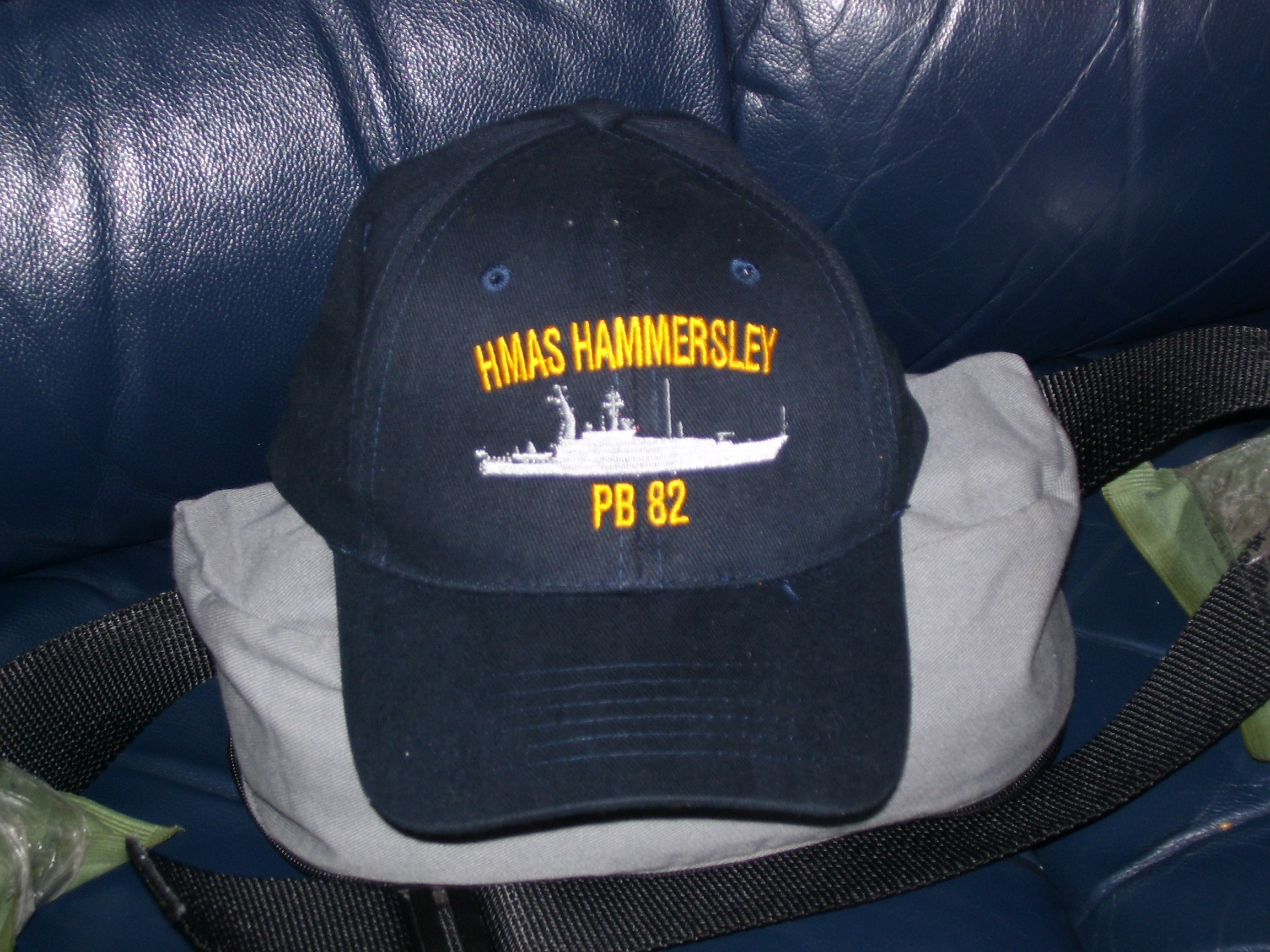
A prop baseball cap from the fictional Armidale-class HMAS Hammersley

When the first season was being filmed, it was predicted that later seasons would replace Hammersley with the newer Armidale-class patrol boat. Subsequent seasons have used an Armidale class ship, also named HMAS Hammersley, with the hull number 82. For Season 2, footage from two ships was conflated to represent Hammersley: 42 of the 86 days of the series filming were spent aboard HMAS Broome, with later pick-up filming aboard HMAS Launceston.

=== Locations ===
- Cairns, Queensland
- Gold Coast Convention and Exhibition Centre, Broadbeach, Queensland
- HMAS Waterhen, Navy Base, Sydney, New South Wales
- Dunk Island, Queensland
- Mission Beach, Queensland
- Cowley Beach, near Innisfail, Queensland
- Tamborine Mountain, Queensland
- Tumbulgum, New South Wales
- HMAS Penguin

== Episodes ==
Season	Episodes	Originally aired		DVD release
Season	Episodes	Season premiere	Season finale	Region 4
1	13	5 July 2007	4 October 2007	17 October 2007
2	13	31 March 2008	23 June 2008	6 November 2008
3	13	18 May 2009	27 July 2009	1 October 2009
4	16	15 April 2010	29 July 2010	19 August 2010
5	13	26 April 2011	12 July 2011	4 August 2011

== Reception ==
Before Sea Patrol aired, it was one of the most highly anticipated programmes in Australia, partly due to the episode budget of over A$1 million, twice that of other Australian dramas. Sea Patrol also marked the return of Lisa McCune to television acting.

Sea Patrol received mixed but generally positive reviews. The first season received an average 1.5 million viewers, which dropped during the early part of season two before returning to 1.5 million viewers for the final five episodes.

Marieke Hardy, for The Age, commented "I don't really get Sea Patrol... the general gist of it leaves me somewhat cold", and further claimed that the scripts were not well written and that the actors were not given the opportunity to shine.

Michelle Over, a reviewer for militarypeople.com.au, scored the first episode a disappointing 6.5 out of 10. Over also predicted that the series would begin jumping the shark at episode 5, primarily due to a lack of quality scripts and an unlikeness to the real life of a Navy officer.

Shortly after the series began, the Royal Australian Navy created "The Real Sea Patrol", an interactive website about the activities and personnel on board the Australian patrol boat HMAS Larrakia, designed as a promotional and recruiting tool to capitalise on the series.

== Awards and nominations ==
=== Logie Awards ===
Year	Nominee	Award	Result
2008	Lisa McCune	Most Popular Personality on Australian Television	Nomination
2008	Lisa McCune	Most Popular Actress	Nomination
2008	David Lyons	Most Popular New Male Talent	Nomination
2009	Kirsty Lee Allan	Most Popular New Female Talent	Nomination

== Media information ==
=== Broadcast history ===
Season	Episodes	Originally aired	
Season	Episodes	First aired	Last aired
1	13	5 July 2007	4 October 2007
2	13	31 March 2008	23 June 2008
3	13	18 May 2009	27 July 2009
4	16	15 April 2010	29 July 2010
5	13	26 April 2011	12 July 2011

=== DVD releases ===
Season	Date Released	# Of Episodes	# Of Discs	Special Features
Sea Patrol – The Complete Series 1	17 October 2007	13	4	Slipcase Packaging
Sea Patrol II: The Coup – The Complete Series 2	6 November 2008	13	4	Slipcase Packaging
Sea Patrol III: Red Gold – The Complete Series 3	1 October 2009	13	4	Slipcase Packaging
Sea Patrol IV: The Right Stuff – The Complete Series 4	19 August 2010	16	4	None
Sea Patrol V: Damage Control – The Complete Series 5	4 August 2011	13	4	None
Sea Patrol: The Complete Series 1-5	24 November 2011	68	20	Custom Packaging
Sea Patrol: The Complete Series 1-5	4 December 2013	68	20	Repackaged (Slipbox with 5 Keep Cases)

=== Internet download ===
From 1 April 2008, full episodes of Sea Patrol were offered as free download, as part of ninemsn's catch-up TV service. This download required a third-party player, advertisements were contained in the downloaded files, and the episodes were programmed to be unplayable after the season finished airing. Due to geo-locational IP blocking, the ninemsn service may not be available outside Australia.

The second season of Sea Patrol was released on the Australian iTunes Store on 25 June 2008.

The first season of Sea Patrol was made available in the United States on the streaming video website Hulu in 2009 and the second season was made available in 2012 . In early January 2013, season 3, 4, & 5 was released on Hulu.

Between 2021 and 2022 all episodes were freely available on the Nine Now streaming service to Australian viewers, but sometime between 16 August 2022 and 19 January 2025 the show was removed from the streaming service.

As of 2025, all episodes are available on Tubi, Amazon Prime, Youtube Movies, and the Roku Channel in the United States. But have been region locked on those platforms to Australian viewers. Australian viewers are able to access episodes on Apple TV+.

== International distribution ==
According to an April 2007 Nine Network press release, international rights to the series "in over 100 territories" were sold to Sparrowhawk Media by Nine Network's international distribution representative, Portman Film and Television. This deal gave Sea Patrol the ability to be seen on various international versions of the Hallmark Channel. As a part of this initial deal, either one or both of the first two seasons of Sea Patrol were seen on Hallmark Channels in many territories throughout the world. Some of the 61 countries in which these early seasons aired on Hallmark included: the United Kingdom, Norway, Sweden, Denmark, Serbia, Belgium, Indonesia, India, Russia, Italy, South Africa, Mexico, Vietnam, and Palau. In Germany, the series aired since 2011 on Das Vierte. And since 2014 on the new channel Ebru TV.

Later in 2007, NBC Universal Global Networks bought Sparrowhawk. In 2008, NBC Universal Global Networks extended its inherited commitment to Sea Patrol by purchasing series three of the program from Digital Rights Group, a subsidiary of Portman. Despite being a US-based company, as of 2009, NBC Universal is yet to broadcast the series in the United States. Instead, Sea Patrol has had limited availability in America through the broadband provider Hulu, arranged directly by Digital Rights Group, and on the Roku Channel.

=== International markets ===
Market	Language	Title	Seasons	Channels	Airdates	Notes
Canada	English	"Sea Patrol"		Showcase		
Canada	French	"Patrouille des Mers"		Séries+		
United Kingdom	English	"Sea Patrol"	1–5	Universal Channel (UK and Ireland)		
Italy	Italian	"Sea Patrol"	1–5	Rai 2	9 August 2010 – 3 November 2012	
Germany	German	"Sea Patrol"	1–5	Das Vierte	6 July 2011 – 22 February 2012	
New Zealand	English	"Sea Patrol"	1–5	Prime		
Switzerland	French	"Patrouille des Mers"	1–3	RTS 1 (Swiss TV channel)		
Switzerland	Italian	"Sea Patrol"	1–5	RSI La 1		
United States	English	"Sea Patrol"	1–5	Hulu, Roku Channel and Tubi TV		
United States	Spanish	"Patrulla en Altamar"	1-5	V-me		
Belgium	English	"Sea Patrol"	1–5	één		
Belgium	French	"Sea Patrol, Patrouille des mers"	1–5	RTBF	2013	
Spain	Spanish	"Sea Patrol"	1–5	LaSexta	2013	Multicast in English
The Netherlands	English	"Sea Patrol"	1–5	13th Street and Hallmark Channel		
Ukraine	Ukrainian	"Морський патруль, Sea Patrol"	1–5	NTN		
Norway	English	"Sea Patrol" (at Hallmark Channel) & "Kystvakta" (at NRK)	1-2 (Hallmark) & 1–3 (NRK)	Hallmark Channel & NRK (Norwegian Broadcasting Corporation)	2007-2009 (at Hallmark Channel) & 2014–2015 (at NRK)	
Denmark	English	"Sea Patrol" (at Hallmark Channel) & "Kystvagten"	1–2 (Hallmark) & 1-3 (DR)	Hallmark Channel & DR1 (Danish National Broadcasting Corporation)	2007-2009 (at Hallmark Channel) & 2014–2015 (at DR)	
Sweden	English	"Sea Patrol"	1-2	Hallmark Channel	2007-2009	
