= Luke Erceg =

Australian actor

- Born: 11 August 1993 (age 33); Australia
- Occupation: Actor
- Years active: 2006–2011
- Known for: Mortified

Luke Erceg (born 11 August 1993) is an Australian actor. He appeared on the children's television show Mortified (2006–2007) and a gURLs wURLd (2009).
