= Delphi Greenlaw =

- Shortland Street character
- Portrayed by: Anna Hutchison
- Duration: 2002–2004
- First appearance: 22 March 2002
- Last appearance: Episode 3067; 14 September 2004
- Introduced by: Harriet Crampton
In-universe information
- Father: Dave Greenlaw
- Mother: Liz Greenlaw
- Brothers: Geoff Greenlaw; Patrick Greenlaw
- Sisters: Anne Kahu (adoptive); Peta Greenlaw

Delphine "Delphi" Greenlaw is a fictional character on the New Zealand soap opera Shortland Street, who was portrayed by Anna Hutchison between 2002 and 2004.

The character arrived in early 2002 as the teenage sister of Geoff (Andrew Laing) and his adoptive sister, Anne Greenlaw (Emmeline Hawthorne). The characters tomboy ways saw her favour rugby over fashion and as a result, she was isolated from her peers. The character participated in a hugely high-profile storyline in 2003 where she fell for much older man, Dom (Shane Cortese), who went on to murder Geoff. The character departed in 2004 following the death of both her siblings and intimidation from Dom.

Delphi was highly praised throughout her two-year run, with Hutchison receiving numerous award nominations and winning the "Rising Star" prize in the 2004 TV Guide Best on the Box People's Choice Awards. The characters romance with Dom and struggle with anorexia has seen the character's storylines become iconic since her departure.

== Creation and casting ==
Anna Hutchison landed the 6 month role of the youngest member of the Greenlaw family in late 2002 and started filming in early 2003. However Hutchison's hair was long and blonde, something the producers did not see Delphi wearing and Hutchison was forced to cut and dye it into a mullet. The producers were so impressed by Hutchison, the character of Delphi was extended beyond her 6 months and given meatier storylines. As the character grew up and her personality changed, Hutchison was allowed to grow out her hair again.

== Storylines ==
Delphi arrived to Ferndale as the younger sister of Geoff (Andrew Laing) and Anne Greenlaw (Emmeline Hawthorne). Bullied and picked on for being a tomboy, Delphi successfully tried out for the rugby team and got in. However the bullying took its toll and Delphi suffered an eating disorder. Delphi became besotted by Geoff's friend, Dominic Thompson (Shane Cortese). When she turned 16, the boyish Delphi drastically changed into a more feminine young women in a bid to impress Dom and ended up losing her virginity to her drug dealer boyfriend. When his friends tried to gang rape Delphi, Dom saved her and Delphi attempted to stop him marrying Emily (Sarah Somerville) to no avail. However Dom fell in love with Delphi and the two started to date and planned to leave the country. The mutually attracted Marshall (Paul Reid) showed Delphi evidence that Dom had murdered Geoff, but she was trapped with Dom about to leave the country.

Delphi confronted Dom and he fled Ferndale, fueling the assumption he had killed Geoff. Delphi started to attend university but when Dom returned to Ferndale, she decided it was time to leave and told Chris (Michael Galvin) about the evidence connecting Dom to the crime. Dom confronted Delphi but she was saved, shortly before she left the country in tears.

== Character development ==
=== Relationship with Dom ===
In 2003 the 15-year-old character underwent a storyline where she fell for her brother's friend Dominic Thompson. Dom's portrayer, Shane Cortese was at first uncomfortable with the storyline, stating; "I was very worried about the age difference but the way it's been done and written is really respectful." Cortese also believed despite the age difference, Dom was truly in love with Delphi; "Dom sees Delphi as his soul mate, she affects him in a way no one has before because he's always been suspicious of relationships. He doesn't have to pretend to be anyone else for her to like him." Producer Harriet Crampton enjoyed the romance and how it contrasted with Dom's evil character, stating; "To have a villain who has a strong sincere love or passion makes you think, ‘Okay, he’s an absolute bastard but we know he does love Delphi." The two first get together when Delphi turns 16, sharing a kiss. The two eventually start a relationship but break up when Dom comes under question of Geoff's murder in arguably one of the soap's most memorable storylines. Dom flees when Delphi confronts him about the murder but later returns, with Cortese suggesting it was for love; "But the thing about Dominic is he believes he's doing everything for the right reasons. He's done everything he can for Delphi — that's his main reason for coming back." Dom later scares Delphi into fleeing the country, ending the once seemingly perfect relationship.

== Reception ==
Hutchison received the "Rising Star" award in the TV Guide Best on the Box People's Choice Awards 2004 for her portrayal of Delphi. That same year she also received a nomination for "Best Juvenile Actor in a Television Series" in the New Zealand Television & Film Awards. Hutchison went on to be nominated for the "Best Actress" award in both the 2004 and 2005 TV Guide Best on the Box People's Choice Awards for portraying Delphi. Delphi's eating disorder was named as a key part of the 2002 series and her romance with the villainous Dom has been cited as an iconic and controversial storyline and cliffhanger. Frances Grant of The New Zealand Herald praised the character of Delphi, suggesting after her terrific year she deserved to be the focus of the 2003 cliffhanger, while Greg Dixon offered a more negative opinion, calling the character "incredibly annoying". Since the characters departure, Delphi has been described as "likable".
