= Mortified =

Australian television program

- DVD cover
- Genre: Sitcom
- Created by: Angela Webber
- Written by: Angela Webber; Sam Carroll; Tim Gooding; Johanna Pigott; Steve Wright; Max Dann; Chris Anastassiades; Shirley Pierce; Adam Bowen; Helen McWhirter
- Directed by: Pino Amenta; Paul Moloney; Ian Gilmour; Michael Pattinson; Evan Clarry
- Starring: Marny Kennedy; Nicolas Dunn; Maia Mitchell; Dajana Cahill; Luke Erceg; Rachel Blakely; Andrew Blackman
- Theme music composer: Frank Strangio
- Opening theme: "Get Me Out of Here"
- Country of origin: Australia
- Original language: English
- No. of seasons: 2
- No. of episodes: 26

Production
- Executive producers: Phillip Bowman; Jenny Buckland; Bernadette O'Mahony; Jo Horsburgh
- Producers: Phillip Bowman; Bernadette O'Mahony
- Camera setup: Single-camera (videotape used for end credit scenes)
- Running time: 24 minutes
- Production companies: Enjoy! Entertainment; Australian Children's Television Foundation; Film Finance Corporation Australia; Nine Network
- Budget: $9.3 million (AUS)

Original release
- Network: Nine Network
- Release: 30 June 2006 – 11 April 2007

Mortified is an Australian children's television series co-produced by the Australian Children's Television Foundation and Enjoy Entertainment for the Nine Network Australia created by Angela Webber that premiered on June 30, 2006 and ended on April 11, 2007 with two seasons and a total of 26 episodes. It was nominated for nine awards, winning seven, including Best Children's Television Drama and Marny Kennedy's Young Actor Award for her role as Taylor Fry at the 2006 Australian Film Institute Television Awards.

== Premise ==
Mortified follows the imaginative life of Taylor Fry, an 11-year-old girl living in a fictional beachside town in Australia called Sunburn Beach, struggling to make it through her pre-teen years with her flawed and embarrassing family. She is embarrassed by her parents, Don and Glenda; annoyed by her older sister Layla; sometimes jealous of her close friend/neighbour Brittany; and unaware that her best friend, Hector, has a crush on her while she has a one-sided crush on popular Leon. Taylor frequently breaks the fourth wall and speaks directly to the viewers. Her imagination causes inanimate objects to seemingly come to life.

== Cast ==
=== Main ===
- Marny Kennedy as Taylor Fry, the main character and protagonist who is embarrassed by her parents Don and Glenda, annoyed by her older sister Layla and has a crush on her classmate Leon (while her best friend Hector has a crush on her, but she does not know it as he won't even admit it). Taylor regularly breaks the fourth wall and speaks directly to the viewers.
- Nicolas Dunn as Hector Garcia, Taylor's loyal best friend who often gets dragged along on her crusades. However, he falls out with Taylor twice-- in the episode "Flag Fall" when he volunteers to raise the new Sunburn Primary School flag and Taylor calls him a dork and in the episode "School Trivia Night" when Taylor conspires with Leon to sabotage their families during the event, but he reconciles with her both times. In the episode "DJ Taylor," as Hector secretly has a crush on Taylor, he even goes so far as to send her a Valentine's Day card (though Taylor mistakenly assumes the card was from Leon, though even after finding out that this was not the case, as Leon humiliates Taylor on the airwaves by revealing he doesn't like Valentine's Day, Hector still does not tell her the card was from him). It is revealed in the episode "Taylor Gets a Job" that he is allergic to cats.
- Maia Mitchell as Brittany Flune, Taylor's friend/next-door neighbour who sometimes has a competitive friendship with Taylor. She is beautiful and is best known for being perfect. Like Taylor with her parents Don and Glenda, Brittany is shown to feel embarrassed by her parents, Michael and Loretta, though not to the same extent as Taylor to the point she wants to change her name or try going into space. She talks in flowery language and appears to be the leader of a clique as evidenced in the episode "Bigger Than Vegas."
- Dajana Cahill as Layla Fry, Taylor's older sister who is shallow, irresponsible, nasty, annoying and always getting on Taylor's nerves. She is obsessed with fashion (as evidenced in the episode "Mother in the Nude" when she gets a job of presenting Hibbs Apricot Hand Cream in a TV commercial-- ultimately developing a severe allergic reaction at the end of the episode from overusing the lotion-- and steals Taylor's hairbrush in the episode "The Chosen One") and is always finding and dumping boyfriends (as evidenced in the episode "Return of the Mothership" when she moves on from Scary Mutant Death Monster drummer Lennie, for example). Despite the feud between them, however, Layla does show some positive actions towards Taylor (if that's even possible to believe), as in the episode "Taylor Gets a Job," after realizing that everything Taylor said about her being "the walking definition of selfish" was true, she decided that, since Taylor had struggled so hard to earn enough money to buy a mobile phone of her own so as not to feel left out because Don and Glenda wouldn't buy one because Layla racked up an expensive phone bill, Layla gave Taylor her old mobile phone (all while forgetting to let all her friends know she spent the money she earned working at the Underpant Emporium to buy an updated phone, meaning Taylor ended up getting phone calls from random people during the closing credits) and helped Taylor rebuild the half-destroyed model of a Roman kitchen in the episode "Rome Wasn't Built in a Day" after Taylor reunited her with Dave, the pizza-delivery driver ex-boyfriend Layla dumped for Matt (who, ironically, turned the tables and dumped Layla earlier in the episode after Layla had to cancel her movie date with Matt because Don and Glenda were going to Don's high school reunion and Layla had promised to watch Taylor, even though it was obvious that Taylor was clearly more than capable of watching herself since Hector was over to work on the school project, anyway), resulting in Taylor and Hector receiving a passing grade on the project. It is revealed in the episode "Taylor Turns Bad" that while Glenda considers Layla a rebel, Taylor considers her to be an idiot after Layla's friend Katie's mum confronts Don and Glenda about what a bad influence Layla is after Layla gave Katie's dog the ugliest makeover of all-time.
- Luke Erceg as Leon Lipowski, the class heartthrob whom Taylor and Brittany both have crushes on while Hector is biased against him since Taylor has a crush on Leon (when Hector has a crush on Taylor) and when Leon always throws "missiles" at him in class, much to the annoyance of Mr. McClusky. His father, Gary, is nicknamed "Fingers" and Leon mostly enjoys surfing and sports. It appears Leon is an only child like Brittany and Hector-- that is, until the episode "School Trivia Night," when his older brother, Brett, makes his only appearance in the series (this episode also sees Leon finally admit to parental embarrassment, which heartens Taylor to hear this, as she always believed she was alone in being embarrassed by her parents). It is revealed in the episode "DJ Taylor" that Leon's middle name is Vivian (the only one who knew this secret was Hector when Leon told him in kindergarten; Taylor used this information to her advantage when she took over Mystic Marj's radio segment).
- Rachel Blakely as Glenda Fry, Taylor and Layla's mum and Don's wife who, like Don, is ditzy and wacky and, personality-wise, is stuck in the 1960s. She often helps Don at the Underpant Emporium store. Like her cousin Mystic Marj, she is obsessed with things like chakras/mind/body/spirit and often meditates.
- Andrew Blackman as Don Fry, Taylor and Layla's dad and Glenda's husband referred to as the "Underpant King" and even has a shop that sells underpants in the local shopping centre. Despite being ditzy and wacky like Glenda, Don does show mature effects (as evidenced in the episode "Mother in the Nude," when he rescued Taylor who was in danger of drowning after she had fallen into the sea while wearing a mermaid costume in a failed attempt to prevent the public from seeing Glenda's nude sculpture.

=== Recurring ===
- Sally McKenzie as Mystic Marj, Glenda's seer/fortune teller/mystic/prophetic/psychic cousin who is eccentric and, like Glenda, has a passion for chakras, making a living out of reading tea leaves. Despite her reputation, Marj is often thought to be a fraud and a bit insane (in the episode "Bigger than Vegas," Taylor goes to ask her advice for something and Marj correctly guesses that Taylor had been nominated for school captain, but only because Glenda told her (blabbermouth) and in the episode "Mother in the Nude," she and Taylor create a video where Marj predicts a series of cataclysmic events occurring at the seaside at the time of Sculpture by the Beach-- e.g. rainstorms, glaciers, landslides and thunderstorms-- so as to get the event cancelled and no one believed her).
- Steven Tandy as Mr. McClusky, Taylor, Hector, Brittany and Leon's primary school teacher (and presumably Layla's old primary school teacher, as evidenced in the episode "Taylor Turns Bad," when he keeps saying her name and acts like he really knows her; spoiler alert, he clearly doesn't). He is wise and can be strict at times (especially with Leon when he throws "air-born missiles" at Hector). With the exception of the episode "The Talk," Mr. McClusky appears in every episode of series one, but is completely absent in series two since Taylor, Hector, Brittany and Leon depart for high school (though he is mentioned briefly by Taylor in the episode "Little Fish" that Taylor misses him and his bush-walking socks, to which Hector replies "Seriously?").
- Peter Kent and Veronica Neave as Michael and Loretta Flune, Brittany's lawyer dad and doctor mum, respectively, who are brilliant musicians (as revealed in the episodes "Taylor's DNA" where they play a piano duet for the Sunburn Beach school talent quest and in "Mother in the Nude" where Loretta plays the piano and Michael plays the cello) and like to keep everything "perfect" and are zero-tolerant of stains (as evidenced in the episode "Girl Power," when Taylor accidentally spilled raspberry cordial on the carpet and Brittany ended up getting in trouble for it) and have strict house rules (as seen in the episode "Taylor's Song" when Taylor tries to play the piano without wearing gloves).
- David Anderson as Gary Lipowski, Leon and Brett's dad. His wife is not shown, suggesting/implying that he is either widowed or divorced. He owns a repair shop for things like radios and televisions and microwaves. In the episode "School Trivia Night," he was thought to have briefly stolen the Flunes' television and donated it to Driftwood High School instead of repairing it (even though there was nothing wrong with the TV other than Loretta's paranoia driving the rest of the house crazy).

== Episodes ==
Series overview

Series	Episodes	Originally released	
Series	Episodes	First released	Last released
1	13	30 June 2006	22 September 2006
2	13	10 November 2006	11 April 2007

=== Season 1 (2006) ===
No. overall	No. in season	Title	Directed by	Written by	Original release date	Prod. code
1	1	"Taylor's DNA"	Pino Amenta	Angela Webber	30 June 2006	101
Taylor is certain she will die of public humiliation when Don and Glenda enter a talent quest for parents at her school. Not one to back away from a challenge, Taylor drags Hector along on a crusade to prove through DNA analysis that Don and Glenda are, in fact, not her parents and, therefore, cannot enter the talent quest.
2	2	"Bigger Than Vegas"	Paul Moloney	Tim Gooding	7 July 2006	102
Hector secretly nominates Taylor for School Captain, unwittingly igniting her passion for politics. It seems to be a two-horse race as Taylor goes up against the perfect, beautiful and seemingly unbeatable Brittany (all but underestimating Melissa Reddick, the third girls' nominee, who ultimately wins). Taylor finds herself determined to win, all while trying to ignore Don's petty annual 'Christmas Lights' rivalry with Michael.
3	3	"Learning to Surf"	Evan Clarry	Sam Carroll	14 July 2006	103
Taylor is embarrassed when she is sprung fantasizing about becoming a pro-surfer and covers the lie by claiming she can surf, but when heartthrob Leon invites her to enter a surfing competition, Taylor feels she has no choice but to enter, a situation that snowballs out of control as Taylor is forced to learn how to surf within a few short days... on her dad's massive Malibu surfboard, no less!
4	4	"Mother in the Nude"	Paul Moloney	Angela Webber	21 July 2006	104
Taylor is struck dumb when she arrives home from school with Brittany and Leon to find Glenda creating a nude sculpture of herself. To make matters worse, her entire class will attend the public unveiling at Sculpture by the Beach at the end of the week, but Taylor's effort to upstage the reveal makes a bigger splash than she intended when she needs Don to save her from drowning. Absent: Peter Kent (despite being in the closing credits)
5	5	"The Chosen One"	Pino Amenta	Angela Webber	28 July 2006	105
Taylor is inspired by the teachings of a Buddhist monk, who shares the concept of a simple life without possessions. She decides to live a serene and noble life and starts by sacrificing all her material possessions in pursuit of true happiness. However, she quickly finds out that this is not as easy as it sounds or looks, as her earthly desires get in the way.
6	6	"The Talk"	Pino Amenta	Tim Gooding	4 August 2006	106
When Taylor develops a crush on Joel, a teenage martial arts instructor, she signs up for classes just to see him while avoiding her parents from the fear of getting "The Talk." Absent: Steven Tandy (despite being in the closing credits)
7	7	"Flag Fall"	Pino Amenta	Johanna Pigott	11 August 2006	107
Taylor becomes image conscious and starts to worry about her appearance, so with Brittany's help, she adapts to a new sense of style, but Hector is not very happy with Taylor's new attitude after he volunteers to put up the School Flag.
8	8	"The Big Game"	Paul Moloney	Steve Wright	18 August 2006	108
After witnessing Leon's soccer skill and watching him play, Taylor is inspired to join the School Soccer Team. However, she is terrified to learn that unless someone volunteers to be coach, the first game will be cancelled. Luckily, Don jumps at the chance to be coach, if only to get out of teaching Layla how to drive.
9	9	"Return of the Mothership"	Pino Amenta	Angela Webber	25 August 2006	109
After being embarrassed by her family one too many times (with Don's Underpant King poster being shown to her entire class being the last straw), Taylor decides to join an eccentric old couple who believe they will be abducted by aliens and taken into outer space in a mother ship.
10	10	"The Cross Country"	Evan Clarry	Max Dann	1 September 2006	110
Taylor wins her school cross-country race, but as she basks in her new-found fame and glory, she fails to confess that Mystic Marj drove her to the finish line after she ran into a utility pole. Taylor faces the prospect of moving to Scotland when, through a case of mistaken identity, her father inherits a "grand Scottish estate" from Uncle Angus, a man whom the family had never even met.
11	11	"Taylor Turns Bad"	Pino Amenta	Sam Carroll	8 September 2006	111
Taylor notices people whispering behind her back and soon learns that rumours are circulating about her. The discovery gives Taylor a revelation about what it takes to get noticed and sets out to garner the attention she desperately wants. Although her plans to finally get the attention Layla always gets eventually do work, she gets grounded, which means she'll miss Leon's bowling party. As Layla convinces Taylor to sneak out, Layla secretly pulls Taylor's jeans off, leaving her in nothing but a skirt top, her underwear and even bigger trouble with Don and Glenda.
12	12	"Being Me"	Evan Clarry	Johanna Pigott	15 September 2006	112
With the end-of-term disco coming up, Taylor starts to query her image and identity. She fears that her refusal to conform to fashion rules will ruin her social life, so taking advice from Joan of Arc, Taylor decides that if she's ever going to improve her life, changing her name is the only option.
13	13	"Leaving Primary"	Pino Amenta	Angela Webber	22 September 2006	113
The last day of primary school finally arrives and it seems that Taylor's circle of friends is being ripped apart, as they all face the prospect of heading off to different high schools. Taylor is torn as she is forced to make some serious decisions about her future. Note: This episode marks the final appearance of Mr. McClusky (Steven Tandy).

=== Season 2 (2006-2007) ===
No. overall	No. in season	Title	Directed by	Written by	Original release date	Prod. code
14	1	"Little Fish"	Ian Gilmour	Angela Webber	10 November 2006	201
It is Taylor's first day as a high school student and she is confident that it will be everything she dreamed it would be, but her enthusiasm quickly dissolves as everything that can go wrong does. First, she misses the bus, then loses Hector and, when she finally makes it to school, smells like rotten fish... all thanks to Glenda's super home-mix de-stress aromatherapy ointment. To make matters worse, due to Glenda starting her massage business with Mystic Marj, Taylor has to share a room with Layla. Absent: Luke Erceg
15	2	"Parent Teacher Night"	Michael Pattinson	Tim Gooding	17 November 2006	202
With parent-teacher night looming, Taylor is shocked to find Don doing bicep curls on the front lawn, surrounded by stack of vinyl records. Layla informs her that his bizarre behaviour is due to a mid-life crisis (he's turning 40, by the way) and might last anywhere up to three years. Taylor is mortified at the prospect of Don showing up at parent-teacher night and tries in vain to prevent him from going, even going so far as to throw him a 40th birthday party to happen after the parent-teacher night is over.
16	3	"DJ Taylor"	Paul Moloney	Angela Webber	24 November 2006	203
It is work experience time and Taylor is thrilled to be granted a position with the local radio station, working as a DJ, but her hopes fade as she is assigned to Mystic Marj's psychic talk-back segment. To make matters, worse, she is forced to get in touch with her own inner psychic when Mystic Marj accidentally locks herself in the toilets, leaving Taylor to deal with a switchboard full of needy callers, going by the pseudonym of "Claire Voyant." However, Taylor receives a Valentine's Day card from a secret admirer (who is actually Hector, but she thinks it's Leon).
17	4	"School Trivia Night"	Pino Amenta	Chris Anastassiades	1 December 2006	204
Taylor is less than impressed when her family teams up with heartthrob Leon's family for the school trivia night. Taylor prepares herself for ultimate humiliation as she realizes just how "trivial" her parents' knowledge really is.
18	5	"Taylor's Self Portrait"	Ian Gilmour	Shirley Pierce	5 January 2007	205
When Taylor learns that a revealing self-portrait is to be auctioned off for charity, she scrambles to prevent it, but things go from bad to even worse when she discovers the painting is not the only thing that's fallen into a stranger's hands-- her diary is missing too. Absent: Peter Kent (despite being in the closing credits)
19	6	"The Wedding"	Pino Amenta	Angela Webber	12 January 2007	206
Taylor is horrified to discover Don and Glenda are not technically married and, after seeking advice from Brittany's father, tries to convince them to have a proper, traditional wedding. Her horror turns to happiness when Don, on bended knee, shocks her when he proposes to Glenda at a poetry festival, but the joy is quickly short-lived as she realizes the wedding is going to be a complete recreation of the original ceremony.
20	7	"First Child in Space"	Paul Moloney	Adam Bowen	19 January 2007	207
Taylor is devastated to discover that Glenda is going to be teaching "Healing by Humming" at Driftwood High. She decides that there is only one logical way to solve her problems and escape her family-- start her campaign, with Hector's help, to become the first child astronaut in space. Unfortunately, when she learns that Brittany's mother, who just so happens to be president of the P&C, has scrapped the Science Club in favor of upgrading the toilet block, she is even more devastated, but that's nothing compared to learning that Glenda wants to replace Loretta as P&C president.
21	8	"The Family Tree"	Michael Pattinson	Helen McWhirter	26 January 2007	208
Taylor has to do an assignment on an ancestor or relative, but everyone she can think of is far too embarrassing to interview. When the Fry family receives a visit from their Great Aunt Ally, Taylor thinks the universe is smiling on her at last. However, she quickly realizes that Great Aunt Ally is an eccentric and her hopes of finally finding an interesting and inspiring relative to interview for her assignment are dashed-- that is, until the kooky old woman teaches her a valuable lesson about luck.
22	9	"Divorce Camp"	Michael Pattinson	Tim Gooding	28 February 2007	209
After an argument between Don and Glenda, Taylor fears that her parents are getting a divorce. At school camp, Taylor convinces herself that there is something going on between her mother and her teacher, Mr. Frankel, so she sabotages every activity in an effort to keep them apart, but as one thing leads to another, Taylor finds herself lost in the bush. Absent: Dajana Cahill
23	10	"Taylor Gets a Job"	Paul Moloney	Angela Webber and Sam Carroll	21 March 2007	210
All Taylor's friends have mobile phones (Leon has two) and she starts to feel left out. She decides she will get a job and save for a phone herself. Unfortunately, the job of pet-sitting Mystic Marj's cats while her house is getting worked on turns out to be somewhat less simple than she had anticipated, as the unruly cats take over Taylor's bedroom and run riot. Note: In the original Nine Network airing, Marny Kennedy appears as herself prior to the episode informing viewers that this episode is dedicated to the memory of series creator Angela Webber (who passed away 11 days before this episode aired).
24	11	"Rome Wasn't Built in a Day"	Pino Amenta	Steve Wright	28 March 2007	211
Don and Glenda leave Layla and Taylor home alone while they head to Don's high school reunion, but when Layla receives a text from her most recent heartthrob Matt announcing that he's dumping her and going out with another girl, she starts sobbing uncontrollably. It is a domino effect as things go from bad to worse as not only does the oven catch on fire (thanks to Layla being irresponsible by putting the microwave meals Glenda had left for dinner in the oven with the plastic wrap still on), but Hector's half-built model melts (from Taylor trying to extinguish the smoke) and the TV breaks. Now Taylor and Hector not only have to dry Layla's tears and save the day, but also maintain their composure enough to complete their school project.
25	12	"Girl Power"	Ian Gilmour	Tim Gooding	4 April 2007	212
Taylor is devastated to learn that Brittany and her family are moving house. As Michael and Loretta vacuum their front lawn in preparation for the sale of their house, Taylor and Brittany hatch a cunning scheme to sabotage the open day and ensure that they can remain next-door neighbours forever, even going so far as to start a rodent infestation.
26	13	"Taylor's Song"	Pino Amenta	Sam Carroll	11 April 2007	213
Taylor thinks all her prayers have been answered when she is allowed to move in with Brittany for a few days while Don, Glenda and Layla head out of town, but she quickly realizes that Brittany's family is a well-oiled machine with strict house rules, a dilemma she shares with Beethoven and learns a valuable lesson: even though her own family might not be perfect, they are perfect for her. Note: This is the end of the series.

== Development and production ==
Filming

Mortified was created by screenwriter and author Angela Webber (who passed away just 11 days before the "Taylor Gets a Job" episode aired) and directed by Pino Amenta. The first season of Mortified had a budget of A$9.3 million. It was shot on location in Coolangatta, Palm Beach, Currumbin, Burleigh Heads, Elanora, Tugun and Bilinga on the Gold Coast, with most of the school scenes filmed at the local Palm Beach Currumbin High School and Coolangatta State School starting on June 8, 2005 and the shopping centre scenes filmed at The Pines Shopping Centre, primarily outside Woolworths and inside the Dimmeys store located opposite Woolworths. Mortified was launched in Cannes at MIPTV in April 2006.

=== International broadcast ===
Country/Region	Network(s)	Broadcast run	Title
Australia	Disney Channel; ABC3		Mortified
Spain	Disney Channel Spain; Cartoon Network Spain; Antena 3 (Spain)	2006-2007	¿Por qué a mí?
Argentina	Disney Channel Latin America	2007-2011	¿Por qué a mí?
Austria	ORF eins		Meine peinlichen Eltern
Brazil	Disney Channel Brazil; TV Cultura	2007-2011	Ninguém Merece!
Canada	BBC Kids		Mortified
Chile	Canal 13	2008	¿Por qué a mí?
Colombia	Señal Colombia	2010	¿Por qué a mí?
Ecuador	Ecuavisa		¿Por qué a mí?
France	Disney Channel France		Morte de honte!
Germany	KiKa	March 12, 2008	Meine peinlichen Eltern
India	Disney Channel India	2007-2008	मोर्टीफाईड (Hindi)
Ireland	RTÉ	2007-2010	
Israel			כזאת מושפלת
Japan	NHK	March 31, 2008-?	気分はぐるぐる
Italy	Disney Channel Italy		Perché a me
Mexico	Disney Channel Latin America; Canal Once	2007-2015	¿Por qué a mí?
Netherlands	Zapp		Mortified Zóóó gênant
Norway	NRK Super		Dødsflaut
Portugal	Canal Panda		Que vida a minha
Russia	Disney Channel Russia		Непокорная
South Korea	EBS		테일러는 12살
Sweden	SVT Barnkanalen		Pinsamheter
United Kingdom	CBBC; Pop Girl		Mortified
United States	Starz Kids & Family	March 1, 2011-present	Mortified
Venezuela	Televen	2010	¿Por qué a mí?
Vietnam	HTV3	November 28, 2012-present	Tuổi ô mai

== Crew ==
- Series creator: Angela Webber
- Executive producers: Phillip Bowman, Jenny Buckland, Bernadette O'Mahony, Jo Horsburgh
- Producers: Phillip Bowman, Bernadette O'Mahony
- Writers: Angela Webber, Sam Carroll, Tim Gooding, Johanna Pigott, Steve Wright, Max Dann, Chris Anastassiades, Shirley Pierce, Adam Bowen, Helen McWhirter
- Directors: Pino Amenta, Paul Moloney, Ian Gilmour, Michael Pattinson, Evan Clarry
- Script editors: Sam Carroll, Steve Wright

== Awards and nominations ==
Year	Award	Category	Recipient	Result
2007	New York Festivals Television Programming and Promotion Aards	Grand Award for Best Youth Program	-	Won
2007	New York Festivals Television Programming and Promotion Aards	Gold World Medal for Youth Programs ages 7-12	-	Won
2006	Australian Film Institute Awards	Best Children's Television Drama	-	Won
2006	Australian Film Institute Awards	Young Actor Award	Marny Kennedy	Won
2006	Australian Film Institute Awards	Best Direction In Television	Pino Amenta (for the pilot episode "Taylor's DNA")	Nominee
2006	Australian Film Institute Awards	Best Screenplay In Television	Angela Webber (for the pilot episode "Taylor's DNA")	Nominee
2006	Chicago International Children's Film Festival	First Prize in the Live Action Television category	-	Won
2006	54th Columbus International Film & Video Festival	Bronze Plaque for Children and Youth Programs	-	Won
2006	Australian Teachers of Media Awards	Best Children's Television Series	-	Won
