= List of Sea Patrol episodes =

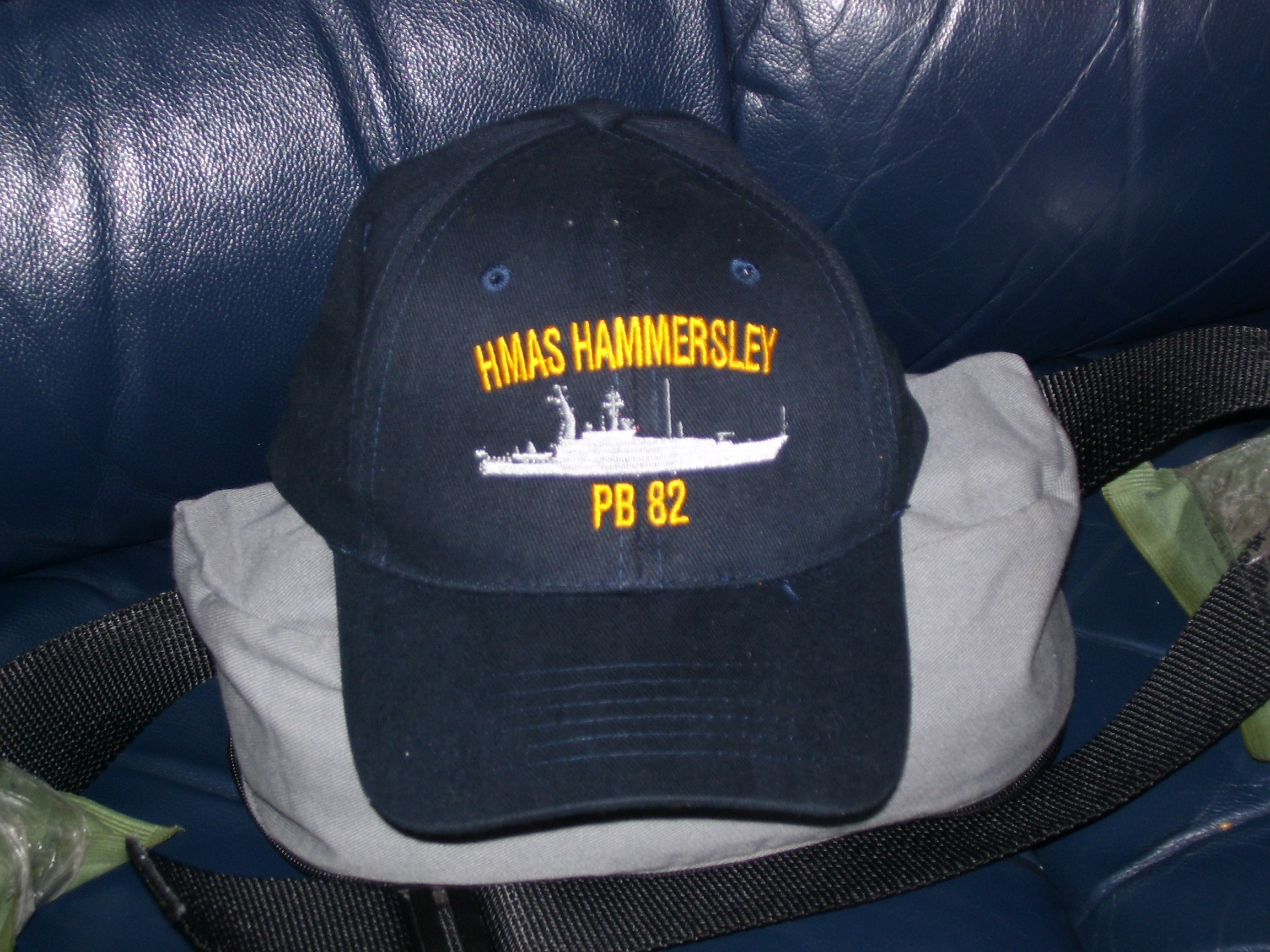
Armidale class HMAS Hammersley cap

Sea Patrol is an Australian drama television series which premiered on 5 July 2007 in Australia on the Nine Network. Each series contains 13 episodes, with the first season of Sea Patrol premiering on 5 July 2007, and concluding on 4 October 2007. The second season, titled Sea Patrol II: The Coup, debuted on 31 March 2008, and ended on 23 June 2008. The third season is titled Sea Patrol: Red Gold. Sea Patrol: Red Gold premiered on 18 May 2009 and ended 27 July 2009. The fourth season debuted on 15 April 2010 and concluded on 29 July 2010. The final season five started on 26 April 2011 and concluded on 12 July 2011. Over the five seasons, 68 episodes were aired.

== Series overview ==
Season	Episodes	Originally aired	
Season	Episodes	First aired	Last aired
1	13	5 July 2007	4 October 2007
2	13	31 March 2008	23 June 2008
3	13	18 May 2009	27 July 2009
4	16	15 April 2010	29 July 2010
5	13	26 April 2011	12 July 2011

== Episodes ==
=== Season 1 (2007) ===
No. overall	No. in season	Title	Directed by	Written by	Original release date	AUS viewers (millions)
1	1	"Welcome Aboard"	Chris Martin-Jones	Tony Morphett	5 July 2007	1.98
2	2	"What Lies Beneath"	Chris Martin-Jones	Tony Morphett	12 July 2007	1.662
3	3	"Ghost of Things Past"	Chris Martin-Jones	Michaeley O'Brien	19 July 2007	1.799
4	4	"Irukandji"	Chris Martin-Jones	Jeff Truman	26 July 2007	1.617
5	5	"Under the Radar"	Chris Martin-Jones	Marcia Gardner	2 August 2007	1.601
6	6	"Precious Cargo"	Chris Martin-Jones	John Ridley	9 August 2007	1.581
7	7	"Rescue Me"	Geoff Bennett	John Ridley	16 August 2007	1.586
8	8	"Through the Storm"	Geoff Bennett	Chris Hawkshaw	23 August 2007	1.466
9	9	"Under the Hammer"	Geoff Bennett	Jeff Truman	30 August 2007	1.337
10	10	"Damage Control"	Geoff Bennett	Sarah Smith	6 September 2007	1.341
11	11	"Chinese Whispers"	Geoff Bennett	Tony Morphett	13 September 2007	1.265
12	12	"Deep Water"	Geoff Bennett	Kristen Dunphy	27 September 2007; NSW, ACT & QLD; 4 October 2007; VIC, TAS, SA & WA	1.172
13	13	"Cometh the Hour"	Chris Martin-Jones	Dave Warner	4 October 2007	1.209

=== Season 2 (2008) ===
No. overall	No. in season	Title	Directed by	Written by	Original release date	AUS viewers (millions)
14	1	"The Dogs of War"	Geoff Bennett	Adam H. Todd	31 March 2008	1.247
15	2	"Fortune Favours"	Ian Barry	Michaeley O'Brien	7 April 2008	1.222
16	3	"Takedown"	Geoff Bennett	Tony Morphett	14 April 2008	1.267
17	4	"Heaven Born Captains"	Ian Barry	Jeff Truman	21 April 2008	1.362
18	5	"Giving Up The Dead"	Geoff Bennett	John Ridley	28 April 2008	1.26
19	6	"Birds"	Ian Berry	Matt Ford	5 May 2008	1.287
20	7	"Hidden Agendas"	Geoff Bennett	Philip Dalkin	12 May 2008	1.394
21	8	"Heart of Glass"	Ian Berry	Samantha Winston	19 May 2008	1.38
22	9	"Shadow Line"	Geoff Bennett	Tony Morphett	26 May 2008	1.505
23	10	"Rules of Engagement"	Ian Barry	Jeff Truman	2 June 2008	1.471
24	11	"A Brilliant Career"	Geoff Bennett	Michaeley O'Brien	9 June 2008	1.491
25	12	"Friends Close, Enemies Closer"	Ian Berry	Felicity Packard	16 June 2008	1.489
26	13	"Soldiers of Fortune"	Ian Berry	John Ridley	23 June 2008	1.486

=== Season 3 (2009) ===
No. overall	No. in season	Title	Directed by	Written by	Original release date	AUS viewers (millions)
27	1	"Catch and Release"	Ian Barry	Adam H Todd	18 May 2009	1.33
28	2	"Monkey Business"	Steve Mann	Felicity Packard	25 May 2009	1.385
29	3	"China Dolls"	Ian Barry	Philip Dalkin	1 June 2009	1.282
30	4	"Guns"	Steve Mann	John Ridley	8 June 2009	1.366
31	5	"Ghost Net"	Ian Barry	Jeff Truman	15 June 2009	1.358
32	6	"Oh Danny Boy"	Steve Mann	John Ridley	22 June 2009	1.309
33	7	"Half Life"	Steve Mann	John Ridley	29 June 2009	1.333
34	8	"Red Sky Morning"	Ian Barry	Tony Morphett	6 July 2009	1.215
35	9	"Pearls Before Swine"	Ian Barry	Matt Ford	13 July 2009	1.350
36	10	"Safeguard"	Steve Mann	Jeff Truman	20 July 2009	1.281
37	11	"Secret Cargo"	Ian Barry	Adam H Todd	20 July 2009	1.197
38	12	"Black Gold"	Steve Mann	Jeff Truman	27 July 2009	1.279
39	13	"Red Reef"	Ian Barry	John Ridley	27 July 2009	1.289

=== Season 4 (2010) ===
No. overall	No. in season	Title	Directed by	Written by	Original release date	AUS viewers (millions)
40	1	"Night of the Long Knives"	Steve Mann	John Ridley	15 April 2010	1.30
41	2	"Crocodile Tears"	Geoff Bennett	Marcia Gardner	22 April 2010	1.10
42	3	"The Right Stuff"	Steve Mann	Philip Dalkin	29 April 2010	1.04
43	4	"Ransom"	Geoff Bennett	Jeff Truman	6 May 2010	1.07
44	5	"Paradise Lost"	Steve Mann	Philip Dalkin	13 May 2010	1.13
45	6	"Big Fish"	Steve Mann	John Ridley	20 May 2010	1.22
46	7	"Shoes of the Fisherman"	Geoff Bennett	Marcia Gardner	27 May 2010	1.17
47	8	"The Universal Donor"	Geoff Bennett	Jeff Truman	3 June 2010	1.19
48	9	"Dutch Courage"	Steve Mann	John Ridley	10 June 2010	1.18
49	10	"Rawhide"	Geoff Bennett	Marcia Gardner	17 June 2010	1.10
50	11	"Brotherhood of the Sea"	Steve Mann	Jeff Truman	24 June 2010	1.19
51	12	"Rumble in the Jungle"	Geoff Bennett	Philip Dalkin	1 July 2010	1.12
52	13	"Soft Target (Soft Touch)"	Marcia Gardner	Steve Mann	8 July 2010	1.04
53	14	"Live Catch"	Geoff Bennett	Jeff Truman	15 July 2010	1.16
54	15	"Flotsam and Jetsam"	Steve Mann	Philip Dalkin	22 July 2010	1.042
55	16	"In Too Deep"	Geoff Bennett	John Ridley	29 July 2010	1.085

=== Season 5 (2011) ===
No. overall	No. in season	Title	Directed by	Written by	Original release date	AUS viewers (millions)
56	1	"The Third Man"	Steve Mann	John Ridley	26 April 2011	0.941
57	2	"Eye for an Eye"	Geoff Bennett	Marcia Gardner	3 May 2011	0.675
58	3	"Crimes of Passion"	Steve Mann	Jeff Truman	10 May 2011	0.603
59	4	"Spoils of War"	Geoff Bennett	Philip Dalkin	17 May 2011	0.718
60	5	"Dead Zone"	Steve Mann	Catherine Ferla	24 May 2011	0.658
61	6	"The Stinger"	Geoff Bennett	Marcia Gardner	31 May 2011	0.645
62	7	"Black Flights"	Steve Mann	Jeff Truman	31 May 2011	0.389
63	8	"Lifeline"	Geoff Bennett	Philip Dalkin	7 June 2011	0.713
64	9	"Dead Sea"	Steve Mann	John Ridley	14 June 2011	0.493
65	10	"The Hunted"	Geoff Bennett	John Ridley	21 June 2011	0.532
66	11	"The Morning After"	Steve Mann	Philip Dalkin	28 June 2011	0.752
67	12	"Saving Ryan"	Geoff Bennett	Jeff Truman	5 July 2011	0.820
68	13	"One Perfect Day"	Steve Mann	Marcia Gardner	12 July 2011	0.843

== Ratings ==
Sea Patrol : AUS viewers per episode (millions)

Season	Episode number															
Season	1	2	3	4	5	6	7	8	9	10	11	12	13	14	15	16
1	1.980	1.662	1.799	1.617	1.601	1.581	1.586	1.466	1.337	1.341	1.265	1.172	1.209	–		
2	1.247	1.222	1.267	1.362	1.260	1.287	1.394	1.380	1.505	1.471	1.491	1.489	1.486	–		
3	1.330	1.385	1.282	1.366	1.358	1.309	1.333	1.215	1.350	1.281	1.197	1.279	1.289	–		
4	1.300	1.100	1.040	1.070	1.130	1.220	1.170	1.190	1.180	1.100	1.190	1.120	1.040	1.160	1.042	1.085
5	0.941	0.675	0.603	0.718	0.658	0.645	0.389	0.713	0.493	0.532	0.752	0.820	0.843	–		

Source: Audience measurement performed by OzTam
