= Dajana Cahill =

Australian actress

- Born: 4 August 1989 (age 37); Brisbane, Queensland, Australia
- Occupation: Actress
- Years active: 2006-2008, 2017-2019
- Known for: Mortified; Sea Patrol; H2O: Just Add Water
- Height: 5 ft 6 in (168 cm)
- Children: 1

Dajana Cahill (born 4 August 1989 in Brisbane, Queensland, Australia) is an Australian former actress best known for her role as Layla Fry in the children's television series Mortified, which aired on Nine Network, ABC1, Disney Channel, BBC in the UK and TV Cultura in Brazil. Cahill also appeared in a three-episode guest role on the Australian soap opera Neighbours as Miranda Kelly.

== Career ==
Cahill resides in Brighton, Melbourne. She began her career at the Film and Television Studio International, studying screen acting on a part-time basis with her acting coach Craig McMahon. She continues to train at the Film and Television Studio International. Cahill also appeared in the second series of Sea Patrol as Carly Walsman, appearing in four episodes. She appeared in one episode of H_{2}O: Just Add Water as Cindy, a volleyball player on the opposite side of the main cast during the second season. In 2017, Cahill returned from a nine-year hiatus to join the Australian soap opera Neighbours in the guest role of Miranda Kelly, her first acting appearance since 2008.

== Filmography ==
TV

TV shows and appearances
Year	Title	Role	Notes
2006-2007	Mortified	Layla Fry	Main role
2008	H_{2}O: Just Add Water	Cindy	"Bubble, Bubble, Toil and Trouble" (season 2, episode 22)
2008	Sea Patrol	Carly Walsman	"Fortune Favours" (season 2, episode 2) "Shadow Line" (season 2, episode 9) "Friends Close, Enemies Closer" (season 2, episode 12) "Soldiers of Fortune" (season 2, episode 13)
2017-2019	Neighbours	Miranda Kelly	Guest role; 3 episodes
