= Dominic Thompson (Shortland Street) =

Fictional character from Shortland Street

- Shortland Street character
- Portrayed by: Shane Cortese
- Duration: 2003–2004
- First appearance: 13 February 2003
- Last appearance: 2 December 2004
- Introduced by: Harriet Crampton
In-universe information
- Other names: Dominic Warner
- Occupation: Physiotherapist
- Mother: Ngaire Thompson
- Sisters: Toni Warner
- Wife: Emily Bredican (2003–2004)
- Nephews: Harry Warner; James Warner

Dominic "Dom" Thompson is a fictional character on the New Zealand soap opera Shortland Street who was portrayed by Shane Cortese from 2003 to 2004.

Dom arrived as the brother of established character Toni Thompson (Laura Hill) in a protagonist role that saw him revealed as the half brother of Chris Warner (Michael Galvin). However the character of Dom soon underwent a major shift following the revelation his relationship with Chris was fake and taking on a more antagonistic characterisation. Central to several key storylines, these included: his marriage to Emily Bredican (Sarah Somerville), affair with 16-year-old Delphi Greenlaw (Anna Hutchison), a rivalry with Chris Warner, murdering Geoff Greenlaw (Andrew Laing), his controversial return on the shows 3000th episode, his murder of Avril Lucich (Kate Louise-Elliott) and a dramatic conclusion episode in December 2004 featuring the character's death.

The 2-year duration of Dom and the villain storyline he was involved in, saw high ratings and praise from viewers. The character ultimately left an impact on fans of the show, being remembered as "iconic".

== Creation and casting ==
After auditioning for Geoff Greenlaw and losing out to Andrew Laing, Shane Cortese learned producers had created a character specifically for him to be the brother of a major character and it was undecided whether the character would be "good or bad". Cortese made his debut as Dom in early 2003 under a yearlong contract with the potential of another 12 month expansion. The character stayed on screen for a year and departed in early 2004. Producers offered Cortese the chance to return on the show's 3000th episode under a contract that would see him continue with the show until mid-2005. Cortese accepted and returned to the show on the momentous 3000th episode. The character ended up getting killed off later in the year.

== Storylines ==
Dom arrived to visit his sister Toni (Laura Hill) and quickly got a job at the hospital. He mysteriously got on well with rival Chris' (Michael Galvin) mother - Margot Warner (Dinah Priestley) and when she died, Dom revealed himself as Chris' illegitimate half brother. Taking up the Warner surname, Dom married Emily (Sarah Somerville) and fought attractions to teenager - Delphi Greenlaw (Anna Hutchison). Following a blood test, Dom realized he was not related to Chris but kept it a secret whilst he started an affair with Delphi. To hide the affair, he drugged his wife and soon became a suspect in the murder of Geoff (Andrew Laing) who had discovered the affair. Once Chris discovered the truth, Dom circulated rumours he was a child molester. Dom and Delphi planned to run away but Delphi discovered Dom had killed Geoff and a desperate Dom fled Ferndale.

Dom returned later in 2004, having started a relationship with Lucy (Sally Stockwell). He managed to successfully avoid capture in relation to Geoff's murder and when Avril (Kate Louise-Elliot) began snooping, he drowned her in his bath tub. When the staff started to turn against Dom after Avril's sister Bernadette (Kate Louise-Elliot) accused him of murder, he faked mental illness and after escaping a psych ward, he lured Chris to a barn and tried to set him on fire. Unsuccessful, Dom ended up getting caught in a large explosion. With intense burns, Dom finally admitted to killing Geoff and Avril before he died in Toni's arms.

== Character development ==
=== Relationship with Delphi Greenlaw ===
In 2003 Dom underwent a storyline where he fell for his best friends sister, 15-year-old Delphi Greenlaw. Cortese was at first uncomfortable with the storyline, stating; "I was very worried about the age difference but the way it's been done and written is really respectful." Cortese also believed despite the age difference, Dom was truly in love with Delphi; "Dom sees Delphi as his soul mate, she affects him in a way no one has before because he's always been suspicious of relationships. He doesn't have to pretend to be anyone else for her to like him." Producer Harriet Crampton enjoyed the romance and how it contrasted with Dom's evil character, stating; "To have a villain who has a strong sincere love or passion makes you think, ‘Okay, he’s an absolute bastard but we know he does love Delphi." The two first get together when Delphi turns 16, sharing a kiss. The two eventually start a relationship but break up when Dom comes under question of Geoff's murder in arguably one of the soap's most memorable storylines. Dom flees when Delphi confronts him about the murder but later returns, with Cortese suggesting it was for love; "But the thing about Dominic is he believes he's doing everything for the right reasons. He's done everything he can for Delphi — that's his main reason for coming back." Dom later scares Delphi into fleeing the country, ending the once seemingly perfect relationship.

== Reception ==
Michael Galvin listed the storyline between Chris and Dom as one of the most iconic storylines on the soap. He believed his physical similarity with Cortese made the storyline more believable and captivating. Rebecca Barry Hill of The New Zealand Herald noted the character of Dom as a highlight of the show. The storyline that saw Dom have an affair with 16-year-old Delphi was viewed on as scandalous. His return on the 3000th episode was described as "jaw dropping". The "Who Killed Geoff Greenlaw" storyline is remembered as hugely iconic. The characters stint proved to be a ratings success and the episodes which saw Dom return, be kidnapped by Bernadette and his death, proved to be the shows highest rating episodes for the year. Cortese himself however, believed he was "awful" in the role of Dom but enjoyed it nonetheless. In 2012, the character was named as one of the standout characters of the show's first 20 years. The storyline between Chris and Dom has been voted by fans as one of the most iconic moments on the show.
