= List of Power Rangers Jungle Fury characters =

List of characters in 'Power Rangers Jungle Fury'

Power Rangers Jungle Fury is the 2008 season of Power Rangers, which tells the story of the fight between the Jungle Fury Power Rangers and the forces of evil led by the spirit Dai Shi.

== Pai Zhua ==
The Pai Zhua (Chinese: 派爪, Pài Zhuǎ) (also known as the Order of the Claw) is the leading protagonist faction of the series. Each member of this faction is given an Animal Spirit that acts as their own unique sentient, beast-like power source. They commit their lives to fusing the idea of martial arts with the abilities of these distinct Animal Spirits. They are the guardians of Earth against the abusive use of Animal Spirits by the series' antagonists, the Dai Shi Clan led by and named after the heartless spirit Dai Shi, for the extinction of humanity and the replacement by and ruling of evil beasts. The Pai Zhua fight against evil by calling on the spiritual powers of beasts and combining such a power source with the martial arts of humanity to use a human and beast spirit dual offense collaboration as a safeguard against the Dai Shi Clan's ways, using this combination of two forms of aggression for good causes.

The Pai Zhua's forces are divided into small groups who each exist with different means, methods and other skills but otherwise all live for the same righteous purpose: the defense of Earth against Dai Shi and both his schemes and forces:

=== Jungle Fury Rangers ===
The Power Rangers in this series combine the partnership of humanity's martial arts and Animal Spirits together with special technologies that serve to provide an essential enhancement to their ways of facing evil forces – such a combination of the Pai Zhua's styles of living and the mechanics of these technologies gives benefits that, as the series progresses, also demonstrate valuable lessons that the younger members of the Pai Zhua learn and understand and thus eventually embrace for the rest of their lives.

The assembly of all of the Rangers in this series takes place divided as separate stories that arise as the series runs its course.

Theo and Lily, the Blue and Yellow Rangers, are introduced as two of the Pai Zhua's six 'finalist' senior students who each must fight a fellow finalist student they are paired with as part of a special event of three simultaneous finalist battles that will decide three winners who shall be assigned the duty of safeguarding the chest-sealed spirit of the evil Dai Shi from escaping and starting his ways once again – they must use all of the lessons, training and discipline they have gained so far try to defeat the finalist senior students they are assigned with for their battles. Eventually Theo and Lily win, and become two of the three who will ensure Dai Shi stays sealed.

Casey, the Red Ranger, is introduced as being a part of a group of assistants for the Pai Zhua's students before his life in the Pai Zhua is redefined prior to becoming a Ranger.

Jarrod, one of the senior student finals winners, is a winner just for a few minutes due to the events which happen after the final. Jarrod instructs an assistant with an unfair, abusive, self-centered, and dissatisfied attitude to perform a request. Casey, who sees this happen, rushes to fulfil Jarrod's request in the abused assistant's place. Jarrod pushes Casey back in an aggressive, unsatisfied response, and Casey unleashes a tiger's roar in retaliation. The students' teacher, Master Mao, witnesses these events and comes to the decision to relieve Jarrod of his status as one of the three guardians of Dai Shi's chest. Casey becomes the third and final member of Dai Shi's chest's safe-guardians by Master Mao's choice.

==== Casey Rhodes ====
Casey Rhodes (portrayed by Jason Smith) was a fairly new member to the Pai Zhua Academy and hence known as a cub and possessed the spirit of the tiger. His power stems from standing up for what he believes in and for others. He doesn't like other people to get picked on. When Casey stood up one day for a fellow cub who was being verbally abused by Jarrod, Master Mao (the leader of the Pai Zhua Academy) dismissed Jarrod. Master Mao saw the potential that Casey had in him and chose him instead of Jarrod, to guard Dai Shi's imprisonment box. After Master Mao was destroyed and Dai Shi escaped, the trio went to Ocean Bluff where they met their new master – RJ – and gave him the powers of the Jungle Fury Red Ranger. Casey still had doubts about himself because his teammates were much more experienced than him and he felt like he had to train twice as hard. At the pizza pallor Jungle Karma Pizza, he was a pro when it came to making pizza. Casey now needed to find out what it takes to become a leader and lead his team. Casey can be overconfident, especially when he tried to go up against Dai Shi alone, which ended with him being hurt. After Lily and Theo had received new masters, Casey was eager to meet his new master, but R.J. was not because it is his father Master Finn. When Master Finn saved Casey from Rinshi, Casey became good friends with the master and mastered the shark technique and the Shark Sabres. Casey eventually made up with R.J. and determined he will always be his master.

When Dai Shi beat up the Rangers profusely in a big showdown and sequestered R.J., the Rangers were left Master-less. R.J. told them they knew what to do, which was to go back to basics, which led them back to the Pai Zhua Academy room where Dai Shi was kept. The Rangers noticed the masters' animal spirits etched in the wall and wondered where Master Rilla, Master Guin, and Master Lope are located. They were greeted once more by their fallen teacher Master Mao. He sent them to the Spirit World at Casey's urging to be trained by three fallen masters. They put them through tests, Master Rilla sent Casey to a dimension that resembled his old bedroom and had to face his childhood fear of a monster in his closet. Once he got it over it, he opened the door to find he had passed the test and granted the Claw Boosters, Jungle Master mode, and Gorilla Spirit Zord.

He was later able to summon the Shark Spirit Ranger whenever needed. Casey's tiger spirit was stolen by Whiger and he was unable to morph, because if he did, his life would be in danger. Casey was teaching a class of young students at the time and one of his students that was always being picked on, helped in giving more power against a foe. Whiger's Rinzin was taken by Dai Shi and banished for not defeating Casey. Casey helped and befriended the weakened Whiger and Whiger assisted him in saving his friends. Whiger then faded away because his power was running out, but he didn't leave Casey's mind.

When Casey battled Master Finn in a test for his Master Stripes, he didn't know what to do and followed what the others did and failed. R.J. later commented to Theo and Lily about this stating that a "student follows his master and doesn't ask." He then saw Jarrod save Camille from danger and was convinced that Jarrod was still in Dai Shi, but no one else believed him. Casey fought Dai Shi in his palace and came back with Jarrod and Camille to join in battle. For this, he earned his Master Stripes from R.J. After the final battle against Dai Shi, Casey was teaching a class in Phi Zhua with Jarrod and Camille as students. He even repeated the "student follows his master and doesn't ask" wisdom to his students.

In Super Megaforce besides teaching children his Kung Fu, Casey works as a part-time zookeeper at the local zoo. He trains Emma and Jake in fighting without using weapons in order to battle the magnetic-powered Pacha Chamak. After the battle when the Rangers visit the zoo to thank Casey, they learn from a zookeeper that no one named Casey works at the zoo. Emma and Jake later see Casey in a gazebo smiling at them before he disappears into thin air. He would later appear-though without removing his helmet as a part of the Ranger army. (Note: Casey's "Tiger Technique" is based on Heihuquan with an emphasis on strength and balance.)

==== Lily Chilman ====
Lily Chilman (portrayed by Anna Hutchison) is a lively young woman who controls the Cheetah Spirit and is eager to be given the powers of the Jungle Fury Yellow Ranger. She soon learns to control the Elephant Spirit and Jungle Mace after training from Master Phant and the Penguin Spirit from Master Guin in the Spirit World. (Note: Lily's "Cheetah Technique" is based on Wing Chun, a style focusing on speed and control.)

Lily was long time student at Pai Zuha, and after succeeding in her final test, had been chosen to help guard the spirit of Dai Shi, along with Casey & Theo.

After Dai Shi escaped, and Master Mao was destroyed, Casey, Theo & Lily went to Ocean Bluff to find their new master, RJ. Now with the powers of the Yellow Ranger at her command, Lily needs to learn that sometimes things need to be taken a bit more seriously. While she is a greatly skilled fighter, Lily can sometimes not comprehend the full severity of a situation.

Once Lily mastered the Elephant Technique from Master Phant, and the others had Mastered their new techniques, the Rangers all thought they were unbeatable. However, Dai Shi had been training with masters as well. When they battled against the new more powerful Dai Shi, the Rangers lost, and would have been destroyed had RJ not intervened and gave himself.

The Rangers realized that their over confidence had been their downfall, but they didn't let that get them down. The team journeyed to the Spirit World, with the help of Master Mao. Once there, they met their new Masters. Master Guin sent Lily on her journey to conquer her fear of spiders. Upon completing her journey, Lily not only gained the power to summon the Penguin Zord, but she also gained the power to morph into her Jungle Master Mode with a Claw Booster.

After much of the year had passed, the time finally came to Casey, Theo & Lily to go through their Pai Zhua Masters Test. For her test, Lily had to battle against Master Phant. The two combatants squared off and fought hard. But in the end, Lily won the fight and earned her title of Pai Zhua Cheetah Master.

In the final battle against Dai Shi, it took help from Camille & Jarrod to help weaken Dai Shi. But only the chosen three could destroy Dai Shi. Together Casey, Theo & Lily reached a level of power no one had ever achieved before. This powerful attack was able to destroy Dai Shi for good.

After the battle was over and won, both Lily & Theo remained at Jungle Karma Pizza working, alongside RJ & Flit. Theo finally managed the courage to ask Lily out on a date, and she said yes.

Lily would later appear in Super Megaforce as part of the veteran Ranger army who came to the aid of the Megaforce Rangers.

==== Theo Martin ====
Theo Martin (portrayed by Aljin Abella) is a smart and well versed fighter in Pai Zhua who controls the Jaguar Spirit when he is given the powers of the Jungle Fury Blue Ranger. He learns to become a team player, eventually gaining control of the Bat Spirit and Jungle Fans after training from Master Swoop and then the Antelope Spirit after training from Master Lope in the Spirit World. He also has an identical twin brother named Lewin. Theo has a crush on Lily, and he asks her for a date later in the last episode.

He would later appear in Super Megaforce where he would join in the final battle with the Warstar Armada. (Note: Theo's "Jaguar Technique" is based on Piguaquan with an emphasis on grace and style.)

==== Robert "R.J." James ====
Robert "R.J." James (portrayed by David de Lautour) is the owner of the Jungle Karma Pizza restaurant and master of the Jungle Fury Power Rangers after Master Mao's loss of his physical body. Years ago, when R.J. was young, his father Master Finn tried constantly to force R.J. to learn the Shark Technique & become a Shark Master. However, R.J. decided to set out on his own. R.J. left home and found his own master, who instructed him in the ways of the Wolf. Upon mastering his Wolf Spirit, R.J. became the new Wolf Master. Sometime later, R.J. opened Jungle Karma Pizza.

After Dai Shi escaped, and Master Mao was destroyed, Casey, Theo & Lily went to Ocean Bluff to find their new master R.J. Though the group didn't not expect the owner of Jungle Karma Pizza to be their master.

R.J. is the laid back Zen type, who while on the outside may not look like much of a teacher or threat, is very skilled in the ways of Pai Zuha. It was through his connections that the Jungle Fury Power Rangers were born. He had the Solar Morphers connected into the Morphin Grid, thus allowing the heroes to become Power Rangers.

R.J. has proven to be quite a powerful warrior. Not only did he use his Wolf Spirit and skills to save his father from Dai Shi, but R.J. also sacrificed his freedom to save his Rangers. In battle with Dai Shi, R.J. refused to fight, and in doing so, allowed Dai Shi a direct attack on the Wolf Spirit.

The attack on R.J.'s Wolf Spirit had a devastating effect on R.J. It somehow turned R.J. into a werewolf causing him to hunger for raw meat, and go into its full form. After three nights of this, and believing that he had attack people in the city, R.J. decided to leave until he could regain his spiritual balance and control his Animal Spirit. However, when he was engaged in battle with one of Grizzaka's monsters, R.J.'s werewolf form came out again, in front of the Rangers. The team had to them battle their own friend for a short time. Once R.J. returned to normal, the team went back to the loft. R.J. explained that if he couldn't regain control, he'd be stuck in his Animal Form forever. It is thanks to Fran that R.J. was able to regain his balance. When he went back into the werewolf state, he was ready to attack Fran, but his friend stood up to him and showed compassion for her boss. Though this friendship, R.J. was able to return to normal. After doing so, R.J. joined the Rangers in battle, but this time he brought along his Wolf Morpher, which he had kept hidden for some time. Now as the Wolf Ranger, R.J. was able to fight alongside his team. He uses his Wolf Morpher as his weapon, and is also able to summon his Wolf Zord. When needed, the Wolf Zord can take the place of the Cheetah Zord in the Jungle Pride Megazord.

R.J. later watched as his trio of students underwent their mastery exams only to see Theo and Lily pass and Casey fail due to his lack of confidence in himself. He later told Theo and Lily that Casey failed when bringing up the known wisdom "A student follows his master and doesn't ask". Casey approached him for help, but R.J. impressed upon him the fact that he could only become a master when he was sure of his own course. Upon Casey successfully freeing Jarrod from Dai Shi, R.J. is the one who gives him his Master Stripes. In the final battle against Dai Shi, it took help from Camille & Jarrod to help weaken Dai Shi. But only the chosen three could destroy Dai Shi, so together Casey, Theo & Lily reached a level of power no one had ever achieved before. This powerful attack was able to destroy Dai Shi for good. After the battle was over and won, R.J. remained in Ocean Bluff, continuing to run his Jungle Karma Pizza Parlor, with the help of Theo, Lily & Flit.

He would later join the other Jungle Fury Rangers in battling the Warstar Armada forces in Super Megaforce. (Note: R.J.'s "Wolf Technique" is based on Muay Thai, a style focusing on powerful strikes with the elbows and knees.)

==== Dominic "Dom" Hargan ====
Dominic "Dom" Hargan (portrayed by Nikolai Nikolaeff) was a student of Master Mao's sent away before the beginning of the series to find his path in life. After six years, he returns to Jungle Karma Pizza posing as Inspector Fuller of the health department until R.J. came down and recognized him. He is initially rejected by the other Rangers because of his irresponsible acts during the fight with Crocovile, until he saves Fran with the refined techniques he developed in his travels. With control over the Rhinoceros Spirit, Dominic transforms into the Jungle Fury Rhino Ranger and uses the Control Dagger to summon the Rhino Steel Zord, unable to form his Spirit into a Zord.

During the last episode he was seen going traveling, asking Fran to come along.

He would later join in the final battle of Super Megaforce as part of the veteran Ranger army. (Note: Dom's "Rhino Technique" is based on Karate putting a strong emphasis on open handed chopping and slashing. He uses his Rhino Blade to enhance the effects of his moves.)

==== Spirit Rangers ====
The Spirit Rangers were created by the Phantom Beasts to battle the Power Rangers by using the Crystal Eyes and controlling the Masters. Once the Masters were freed from the Crystal Eyes, they fought alongside the Rangers by controlling the bodies. They later on gave the Rangers control of the Spirit Rangers by way of summoning their Animal Spirits to fight alongside them. In the Final Beast War, the Spirit Rangers fight alongside the masters that inspired them and the Jungle Fury Power Rangers. Similar to the Titanium Ranger and the S.P.D. A-Squad Rangers, they are exclusive to the series.

- Shark Spirit Ranger – The Shark Animal Spirit morphed into a Ranger form. Originally created with the Crystal Eyes from Master Finn's Spirit to battle the rangers. He can be summoned by either Master Finn or the Red Ranger. He has the moves of Master Finn and uses the Shark Sabers in battle. His ranger outfit is a facsimile of Jungle Master Mode. Originally he is controlled by Master Finn. Later on he is summoned by the Red Ranger into battle. In the Final Beast War, he fights alongside Master Finn himself.
- Bat Spirit Ranger – The Bat Animal Spirit morphed into a Ranger form. Originally created with the Crystal Eyes from Master Swoop's Spirit to battle the rangers. He can be summoned by either Master Swoop or the Blue Ranger. He has the moves of Master Swoop and uses the Jungle Fans in battle. His ranger outfit is a facsimile of Jungle Master Mode. Originally he is controlled by Master Swoop. Later on he is summoned by the Blue Ranger into battle. In the Final Beast War, he fights alongside Master Swoop himself.
- Elephant Spirit Ranger – The Elephant Animal Spirit morphed into a Ranger form. Originally created with the Crystal Eyes from Master Phant's Spirit to battle the rangers. He can be summoned by either Master Phant or the Yellow Ranger. He has the moves of Master Phant and uses the Jungle Mace in battle. His ranger outfit is a facsimile of Jungle Master Mode. Originally he is controlled by Master Phant. Later on he is summoned by the Yellow Ranger into battle. In the Final Beast War, he fights alongside Master Phant himself.

== Allies of the Rangers ==
=== Fran ===
Fran is a book-loving, clumsy, loyal, brave, altruistic customer of Jungle Karma Pizza who is hired to work there by R.J. She discovers that her co-workers are the Power Rangers when she enters R.J.'s loft and sees them fighting on the monitors. She now serves the Ranger squad by either watching the monitors (a task performed by R.J. until he became a Ranger) or taking over the pizza shop when the Rangers have to go to battle. She has a big crush on Dominic after he saved her life when they first met. After Dai Shi's defeat, Dominic invited her to go on a European backpacking trip with him. Hyperventilating, she accepted.

She is portrayed by Sarah Thomson.

=== Pai Zhua Masters ===
The founding members of the Pai Zhua battled Dai Shi and sealed his soul at the cost of losing three of their members in the fight. After Mao's death by the released Dai Shi, the Rangers learn under the three surviving Pai Zhua Masters, before the Masters were later brainwashed by the Phantom Beasts to become slave-like mediums for the Spirit Rangers. In the series finale, the four deceased Pai Zhua masters briefly return to even the Rangers' odds against the resurrected army of Dai Shi, finishing them off in their stronger anthropomorphic forms.

==== Master Mao ====
Master Mao is the Rangers' previous master at the Pai Zhua academy who possesses a caracal spirit, able to assume a stronger anthropomorphic caracal form. Though he died fighting off Dai Shi while protecting the Rangers, Mao continues to help the Rangers in spirit form while attempting to give Jarrod the strength to resist Dai Shi.

He returns in physical form to help the Rangers during the Final Beast War when Dai Shi opens the gate to the spirit world to resurrect his beasts. As his students, Casey, Lily and Theo all derive their fighting styles and their animal spirits from Master Mao, thus why their animal spirits are all based on different species of cats.

He is portrayed by Nathaniel Lees.

==== Master Phant ====
Master Phant is a Pai Zhua master, known for the Jungle Mace and his Elephant Animal Spirit, able to assume a stronger elephant form. He retired prior to the series' beginning, but Lily's persistence caused him to become her master, he decided to help and taught Lily the techniques of the elephant he also teaches Lily how to use the Jungle Mace to defeat the Pangolin. He was later captured by the Phantom Beasts along with the other masters and his animal spirit transformed into the Elephant Ranger. He was freed by R.J. and the Elephant Spirit Ranger now fights with the other Rangers when summoned by either Lily or Master Phant. By the end of the series, he took part in the final battle and was present when the Rangers destroyed Dai Shi.

He is portrayed by Bruce Allpress

==== Master Swoop ====
Master Swoop is a Pai Zhua master who possesses the spirit of the Bat, able to assume a stronger anthropomorphic bat form. He was R.J.'s mentor and taught him to fight without the aid of sight. Though blind and wearing sunglasses, Swoop manages to see things further than they really are and teaches Theo how to focus and trains him to use the Jungle Fan and to channel his Bat Animal Spirit. He was later the first to be captured by the Phantom Beasts and his animal spirit transformed into the Bat Ranger. He was freed by R.J. and the Bat Ranger now fights with the other Rangers when summoned by either Theo or Master Swoop.

He is portrayed by Oliver Driver.

==== Master Finn ====
Master Finn is a Pai Zhua master and who possesses the spirit of the Shark, able to assume a stronger anthropomorphic shark form. Being R.J.'s father, he tried unsuccessfully to teach his style to R.J., causing a rift between them that is not mended until R.J. proves his strength by demonstrating his own control over the Wolf Spirit. Master Finn trains Casey to use his Shark Sabers and teaches him how to channel his Animal Spirit. Later, he is captured by the Phantom Beasts along with the other masters and his animal spirit is transformed into the Shark Ranger. He becomes trapped in one of the Crystal Eyes when his Spirit Ranger is destroyed in battle with the Rangers. Flit saves the Crystal Eye from being thrown in the sea and gives it to R.J., who frees his father. The Shark Ranger now fights along with the other Rangers when summoned by either Casey or Master Finn.

He is portrayed by Paul Gittins.

==== Master Rilla ====
Master Rilla is a Pai Zhua master who possesses the spirit of the Gorilla, able to assume a stronger anthropomorphic gorilla form. He died in the Great Battle and currently resides in the Spirit World. Upon arrival in the Spirit World, Casey was no match for him in combat. When it came to the first test, Master Rilla sends Casey into a dimension to face his fear of the monster in his closet when he was young which he passes. Casey learns how to channel Master Rilla's Gorilla spirit.

He returns in physical form to help the Rangers during the Final Beast War when Dai Shi opens the gate to the spirit world to resurrect his beasts.

He is portrayed by Stig Eldred.

==== Master Guin ====
A Pai Zhua master who possesses the spirit of the Penguin, able to assume a stronger anthropomorphic penguin form. She died in the Great Battle and currently resides in the Spirit World. Upon arrival in the Spirit World, Lily was no match for her in combat. When it came to the first test, Master Guin sends Lily into a dimension to face her fear of spiders which she passes. Lily learns how to channel Master Guin's Penguin spirit.

She returns in physical form to help the Rangers during the Final Beast War when Dai Shi opens the gate to the spirit world to resurrect his beasts.

She is portrayed by Michelle Langstone, who previously portrayed Kat Manx in Power Rangers S.P.D..

==== Master Lope ====
Master Lope is a Pai Zhua master who possesses the spirit of the Antelope, able to assume a stronger anthropomorphic antelope form. He died in the Great Battle and currently resides in the Spirit World. Upon arrival in the Spirit World, Theo was no match for him in combat. When it came to the first test, Master Lope sends Theo into a dimension to face his fear of performing karaoke in front of everyone which he passes. Theo learns how to channel Master Lope's Antelope spirit.

He returns in physical form to help the Rangers during the Final Beast War when Dai Shi opens the gate to the spirit world to resurrect his beasts.

He is portrayed by Andrew Laing.

== Dai Shi Clan ==
The Dai Shi Clan is the antagonistic group of the series. (Note: The Dai Shi Clan was named in the theme song.)

=== Dai Shi ===
Dai Shi is the primary antagonist of Jungle Fury. He is an ancient multi-headed Yellow Dragon who attempted for 10,000 years to rid the world of the human race due to his belief that beasts superior and therefore should be the masters; dealing with the Phantom Beast Generals when they tried to overthrow him. However, Dai Shi was defeated by the first Pai Zhua warriors that became the Masters, sealing his spirit inside a chest and guarded by generations of Pai Zhua members. However, thanks to Jarrod attacking Mao out of anger for being denied the task of guarding him, Dai Shi was released from the seal by accident, killing Mao before using Jarrod's body as his vessel and reviving his Rinshi to continue where he left off, starting the "Beast War" anew. Dai Shi eventually shows up in person and demonstrates his superiority to the Red Ranger at the time the Five Fingers of Poison began their attack, easily defeating Casey without breaking a sweat. Although Dai Shi was primarily in control, Jarrod's humanity still had some influence over him.

After the Five Fingers were destroyed, Dai Shi undergoes the search for the three Overlords, starting with Carnisoar, to master their dark ways. Upon Carnisoar's revival, the wicked master took Dai Shi back through time and altered Jarrod's past, erasing any good deeds Jarrod had done in an effort to help Dai Shi reach the peak of his evil powers. After mastering Jellica's teachings, Dai Shi calls out the Rangers to systematically defeat them until R.J. arrives and surrenders himself to save the Rangers. After defeating R.J., Dai Shi challenges the Rangers with R.J. as bait. Though he has the upper hand at first, Dai Shi is easily defeated by the Red Ranger in his Jungle Master Mode.

After Grizzaka was revived, he overthrew Dai Shi as Grizzaka blamed him for their loss of the first Beast War and is displeased that he was using a human vessel. Following this, Dai Shi began training to master the power of Zocato like Grizzaka did. During one of his training sessions, Master Mao's spirit appeared to try to get through to what's left of Jarrod. It is this encounter that causes him to go on a quest to the Rhino Nexus to enhance his powers. When he did arrive, he couldn't get in due to the force field. When he returned, Jellica captured him and a brief battle with Grizzaka is where Dai Shi learned about the Control Dagger needed to get into the Rhino Nexus. Upon Dai Shi being imprisoned in the dungeon, Camille went out to obtain the Control Dagger and successfully stole it to give to Dai Shi. Passing the Sand Snakes that protect the Rhino Nexus, Dai Shi is attacked by Grizzaka until the Jungle Master Megazord intervene. Dai Shi and Camille made it through the obstacles while the Overlords were occupied. When Dominic confronted them, Dai Shi couldn't get the Control Dagger in and Dominic did so. After Carnisoar's destruction, Dai Shi discovered that his Zocato has enhanced from the effects of the Rhino Nexus.

Dai Shi then faced Grizzaka again, succeeding in overpowering Grizzaka and reclaiming his throne. Camille informed Dai Shi that Dr. Silvia Jennings has the other five Crystal Eyes when the time for the Phantom Beasts' revival was drawing near. When Camille gave him the Crystal Eyes that Grizzaka had gathered, Dai Shi then fought Casey to prevent him from reclaiming the Crystal Eyes before being forced to fall back after Jellica reclaim the three Crystal Eyes. Later, after a vain overthrow attempt by Jellica that cost her life, the Phantom Beasts swear their loyalty to Dai Shi, intent to make him their Phantom Beast King. Dai Shi didn't initially accept their offer because the Phantoms tried to overthrow him during the Beast War, and told them to bring him the three living masters Phant, Swoop and Finn to prove their loyalty, which they soon did and transformed them into the Spirit Rangers.

When the Shark Spirit Ranger was destroyed by the modified Claw Cannon, Dai Shi was told that Master Finn was absorbed into the Crystal Eye. Dai Shi then had Scorch give orders to Unidoom to get rid of that Crystal Eye. When RJ and Master Finn infiltrated the temple, Dai Shi fought RJ after Master Finn & Phant warned him that someday Jarrod would cast him out. After Unidoom's destruction and the Spirit Rangers' defection, Dai Shi uses Whiger in the Phantom Beast Generals' next test of loyalty by having him take Casey's tiger spirit. Once Whiger passed, Dai Shi undergoes the change into the Phantom Beast King, endowed with the spirit of the Griffin. However, Scorch became aware of Jarrod's influence over Dai Shi when he makes Camille a Phantom Beast General and strips Whiger of his rank and Rinzin Power.

After Grinder's defeat, Dai Shi realizes his hold over Jarrod is beginning to malfunction when he attempted to kill Scorch for questioning him. Eventually, Dai Shi regains total control, until Casey stormed his palace. After a long battle, Casey managed to break the spirit's hold over Jarrod and is forced to leave his body before siphoning out both his Rinzin and Camille's. Now without a host, Dai Shi began the final stages of his war and gathered enough fear to resurrect his army. But once his revived army was destroyed, Dai Shi used the masters' animal spirits to restore his physical form and nearly destroys the Rangers. However, when Jarrod attacked Dai Shi from the inside, the monster was weakened enough to finally be destroyed by the three chosen guardians: Casey, Theo, and Lily.

He is voiced by Geoff Dolan. While possessing Jarrod, he is portrayed by Bede Skinner.

==== Jarrod ====
Jarrod was a student of the Pai Zhua and wielder of the lion spirit, able to assume a black lion/Ranger-like armored form known as the Black Lion Warrior when in battle. Though he was highly skilled enough to earn the chance to become one of the guardians of Dai Shi's prison, Jarrod's arrogance forced Master Mao to dismiss him and select Casey instead. In response, Jarrod attacks Mao, accidentally freeing the evil Dai Shi from his prison. Jarrod flees in the chaos, but is taken over by Dai Shi as he runs away. Although he now serves as Dai Shi's host, Jarrod still retains some degree of influence.

Upon the revival of the Phantom Beasts, Jarrod learned the Rinzin Power and gained the spirit of the Griffin. When the Phantom Beasts kidnapped Masters Phant, Swoop and Finn, Jarrod soon began attempting to regain control from Dai Shi, something that Scorch and Snapper take notice of.

After Grinder's defeat, Scorch's fears are realized as his questioning of Dai Shi's recent decisions led to Jarrod attempting to regain control of his body, no longer wanting to be used by Dai Shi. He briefly regained control of his body to save Camille from the last three Phantom Beast Warriors, killing Sonimax and Osiris in the process, explaining to her Dai Shi's true feelings towards her before Dai Shi regains control. Eventually Casey battles Dai Shi again and manages to reach through to Jarrod; as a result Dai Shi is forced out of his body. He helped Casey fight Scorch and defeat him, but afterward he lost his confidence out of guilt for releasing Dai Shi in the first place. Eventually regaining it, he uses the Zocato power to weaken Dai Shi from the inside long enough for Casey, Lily and Theo to destroy it. After the battle, he re-enrolled in the Pai Zhua academy to learn from the beginning. He helped, while Casey was resting he taught the children the way of the lion.

He is portrayed by Bede Skinner.

=== Camille ===
Camille is the servant of Dai Shi, an ill-tempered user of the Chameleon spirit, which gives her the ability to camouflage into her backgrounds and use her long sticky and wet tongue as a weapon in battle. She can also change into a Chameleon-like warrior for her battle mode, using a pair of sai as her weapons of choice. She remained quietly inside a wall until Dai Shi returned in Jarrod's body, resuming her role as his second in command. She serves Dai Shi out of devoted passion, proving herself by perfecting her abilities by withstanding the Claw Cannon and absorbing a bit of its energy before saving her master from Naja, slicing off his Life Talons for Dai Shi to use in his search for the Overlords. Her other various abilities include boosting the power of the Rinshi Beasts.

It is hinted that she may have feelings for Dai Shi/Jarrod as she commented that she found Dai Shi's new body to be attractive and she strives to gain his favor. She was also displeased at Dai Shi's change of personality after Carnisoar's training, deciding to resurrect Jellica to accomplish that. She also openly comments that she cares for him to Lily while she was in disguise. Despite his cold treatment of her, Jarrod may carry the same feelings for her as he influenced Dai Shi to save her twice from Jellica's wrath, though the second time Dai Shi claimed it was because she was still of use. She spares Lily's life when given the opportunity to destroy her, showing Camille has good inside of her that she is withholding.

Camille is followed, and annoyed by, the tiny fly, Flit. She once fought him as a human and cursed him by changing him into his current form and then swallowed him. As a part of the curse, Flit must stay in Camille's stomach or die. While she normally shows him aggression, she has shown a softer side to him meaning she may care about him. Camille had successfully stolen the Control Dagger from Dominic to give to Dai Shi. When at the Rhino Nexus, she was attacked by Sand Snakes only to be saved by Dai Shi.

Camille later informed Dai Shi that Dr. Silvia Jennings has five of the Crystal Eyes when the time of the revival draws near. She infiltrated the Research Center and obtained the 5 Crystal Eyes only to fight Casey. The Rinshi that seized Dr. Jennings served as a diversion for Camille to get away with the Crystal Eyes and present them to Dai Shi. Following the destruction of Unidoom, Camille concludes that she needs Rinzin Power and tries to convince some of the Phantom Beast Warriors to give her some, but they act like she is joking and refuse.

Camille appeared as a hostess on the TV game show "Blow That Dough" in a plot to get the Rangers cancelled. This was thwarted when RJ sent Casey's morpher through the TV. Once Dai Shi becomes the Phantom Beast King, he makes Camille into a Phantom Beast General and gives her Rinzin Power. With her suggestion, she receives the spirit of the Phoenix. She would later be referred to, in this new form, by Scorch and Snapper, as Camille Phoenix. She fought with a spiritless Casey and a Rinzin deprived Whiger when they arrived to free the other Rangers, bested by the combined efforts of the two Tiger Spirits.

She stole a cloning formula from a scientist named Maryl Snyder and used it on Grinder. Afterwards, Camille begins to become targeted by Scorch as she is unknowingly helping Jarrod regain control over himself due to the fact that it is really Jarrod that has feelings for her, rather than Dai Shi. When Jarrod was being attacked by Dai Shi after separating (because he prevented Dai Shi from destroying Casey), Camille ran in to protect Jarrod, losing her Rinzin powers and immortality in the process. Soon after, she helps the rangers in battling Scorch and destroying Snapper. Then, she helps in the fight against Dai Shi, saving the rangers' lives and proving that she strongly cares for the human Jarrod. After Dai Shi was destroyed, she enrolled in the Pai Zhua academy with Jarrod.

She is portrayed by Holly Shanahan.

=== Flit ===
Flit was originally a martial artist who fought Camille before she cursed him into the form of an anthropomorphic fly and then swallowed him. While not truly evil, he usually resides in Camille's stomach as a result of his curse otherwise he will fade away. Normally emerging during Zord battles, Flit monitors the Rangers' fight as a Battle Commentator. Regardless of who has the upper hand, Flit maintains a neutral standpoint and unbiased commentary. When R.J. saves his life, Flit returns the favors by helping R.J. get control of his animal spirit before he is forced to return to Camille when the curse's effects manifest from being away from her for too long. After these events the Rangers, especially R.J., see Flit as a friend. Flit also managed to help R.J. by catching the Crystal Eye (containing Master Finn) that Unidoom threw into the ocean.

By the series finale, Flit has returned to his human form and now works with the rangers at Jungle Karma.

Flit is voiced by Kelson Henderson.

=== The Five Fingers of Poison ===
These are special Rinshi Warriors who are trained in the art of the Five Poisons from Chinese mythology that they are based on. All five appeared in "Now the Final Fury".

==== Rantipede ====
- First Appearance: "A Taste In Poison"
- Voice Actor: Gerald Urquhart

A white sash-wearing Rinshi who holds the spirit of the Centipede. The hood he wears over his head conceals his true face, a coiled centipede's tail. He has the ability to strike up to 1000 times in a few seconds. He issued a challenge to Casey but was met by Lily who battled him. After being defeated, he took off his hood and used the Rangers' fear to enlarge and show his full power. Soon after, he was destroyed by the Jungle Pride Megazord's Savage Spin.

In "Pizza Slice of Life," Naja later revived him to help him overthrow Dai Shi only to be easily vanquished by him.

In "Now the Final Fury," Dai Shi opened a portal to the Spirit World and brought Rantipede back who was defeated by the Rangers and their Masters.

==== Gakko ====
- First Appearance: "A Taste In Poison"
- Voice Actor: Bruce Hopkins

A green sash-wearing Rinshi who holds the spirit of the Gecko. A cunning shurikenjutsu master of surprise attacks, able to attach to any surface as if there were multiple microscopic hairs on his soles. Gakko can remove his own arm to escape a hold and grow a new one while the discarded arm's surprise attack serves as a distraction. As he is constantly over others' heads, he thinks of the walls as 'his world' and looks down at others.

In "Can't Win Them All," he broke Theo's confidence during battle. Gakko later overpowered Casey and Lily, until Theo eventually arrived after regaining his confidence thanks to R.J. Theo managed to beat Gakko in his own 'world' before the Rinshi Beast enlarged and was destroyed by the Jungle Pride Megazord.

In "Pizza Slice of Life," Naja later revived him to help him overthrow Dai Shi, but fled after Rantipede was killed and started attacking the city to gather as much power for himself because he had no other option. He confronted the Rangers and was destroyed by their Claw Cannon.

In "Now the Final Fury," Dai Shi opened a portal to the Spirit World and brought Gakko back who was defeated by the Rangers and their Masters.

==== Stingerella ====
- First Appearance: "A Taste In Poison"
- Voice Actor: Sarah Somerville

A red sash-wearing Rinshi who holds the spirit of the Scorpion and the only female member of The Five Poisons. Her dance and kick combination that earned her the nickname, "Queen of the Toxic Dance." She lightly poisoned Casey in their first encounter, once Jarrod defeated him. The dosage was not enough to kill him, but it did make him temporarily suffer massive pain.

In "Dance the Night Away," she is sent to attack the city with her dancing Rinshi. They trounced the Rangers. The Rangers later responded with a similar dance-based technique. Then, Toady interfered, finally convincing Stingerella that they must join forces to combine their strengths. Stingerella, impressed with Toady's new attitude, she fell in love with him. When Toady was destroyed, she vowed to avenge Toady and grew giant. She unleashed an army of little scorpions on the Jungle Pride Megazord but their Savage Spin shook them off and she was ultimately destroyed by it.

In "Now the Final Fury," Dai Shi opened a portal to the Spirit World and brought Stingerella back. She and Toady fought side by side and were defeated by the Rangers and their Masters.

==== Toady ====
- First Appearance: "A Taste In Poison"
- Voice Actor: Adam Gardiner

A yellow sash-wearing Rinshi who holds the spirit of the Toad. He is able to resist most pain and his ultimate move creates a mucus-based forcefield to block any attack easily. It's later revealed that he loves Stingerella, and that he would do anything for her love.

In "Dance the Night Away," he is also extremely protective of Stingerella, as he viciously attacked the Rangers after he mistook Theo making out with Stingerella. Though he survived the Megazord's attack, Toady ran off in shame when Stingerella was gone. After getting advice from Camille, Toady toughens up and convinces Stingerella to join him in creating a deadly combination of their abilities. However, Toady is destroyed when his barrier is penetrated by a shot from the newly pristine Claw Cannon.

In "Now the Final Fury," Dai Shi opened a portal to the Spirit World and brought Toady back. He and Stingerella fought side by side and were defeated by the Rangers and their Masters.

==== Naja ====
- First Appearance: "A Taste In Poison"
- Voice Actor: Richard Simpson

A blue sash-wearing Rinshi that has the spirit of the Cobra. and the leader of the Five Fingers of Poison. He has highly accurate hits that target the weak points of his opponent, earning him his reputation as a "Master of Instant Victory". He wields two celurit sickles which he can use to generate and fire a destructive energy ball. Naja's greatest power is in his six Life Talons, which allows him to cheat death or resurrect those who are dead. In "Pizza Slice of Life," Naja eventually became fed up with Dai Shi, blaming him for previous defeats. Naja sought to commit mutiny and revealed his intentions to Camille, offering her a place at his side. Naja uses one of his Life Talons to survive her attack before eventually defeating Camille. Soon after, Naja revived Rantipede and Gakko to aid him in defeating Dai Shi while he was meditating. However, Camelle's interference ruined the plan, and she was now able to counter Naja's attack. Though he offered Camille his power over life and death, she sliced off his last three Life Talons before destroying him. In "Now the Final Fury," Dai Shi opened a portal to the Spirit World and brought Naja back. He was defeated by the Rangers and their Masters.

=== The Overlords ===
The Overlords were a trio of demon warriors defeated and slain by the forces of good prior to the series, each with a bracelet that holds that Overlord's soul. Each one holds power over the levels of the world, namely sky, sea, and earth. After the 5 Fingers of Poison were destroyed, Dai Shi commands Camille to bring him the three bracelets of the Three Overlords and also to give him three remaining Life Talons she had taken from Naja, intending to resurrect the Overlords and increase his power through their teaching methods. They were all eventually destroyed until they were revived by Dai Shi for the final Beast War, but were destroyed again by the Power Rangers and the Pai Zhua Masters.

==== Carnisoar ====
Carnisoar is the Sky Overlord and the holder of the Hawk spirit, a master of aerial martial arts. He uses a double-breasted guandao halberd and feather shurikens in his attack. Intending to resurrect the Overlords to become stronger, Dai Shi chooses Carnisoar to be the first to Camille's dismay due to his brutal teaching methods. Upon his revival, Carnisoar took Dai Shi into Jarrod's past to eliminate every good deeds that he did as a child, making Dai Shi stronger as a result. After this, Carnisoar returned to Dai Shi's hideout to begin the actual training, teaching Dai Shi to harness his hatred as power until Jellica was revived. After Dai Shi manages to beat Jellica, Carnisoar leaves his training to her. He returned to help Dai Shi kill the Rangers briefly, reviving the Black Shadow Guard.

Carnisoar later sided with Grizzaka upon his revival, setting up the chamber to revive the Phantom Beast Generals after obtaining their Crystal Eyes for Grizaka. Once arriving at the Rhino Nexus with the other Overlords, where they ran afoul of the Power Rangers, Carnisoar fought Casey, Theo, Lily, and RJ in his Illusion Dimension after withstanding the Claw Cannon. When Casey used his Tiger Instincts to find the real Carnisoar and attacked him before Carnisoar grew and fought the Wolf Pride Megazord and the Jungle Master Megazord. Carnisoar managed to overwhelm them until Dominic arrived in the Steel Rhino Zord. Before he was destroyed at the hands of the Rhino Pride Megazord, he tells them that they may defeated him, but the "war is far from over."

He was revived by Dai Shi for the final Beast War, but was destroyed again by the Power Rangers and the Pai Zhua Masters.

Carnisoar is voiced by Cameron Rhodes.

===== Bai Lai =====
- First Appearance: "Blind Leading the Blind"
- Voice Actor: Josh Thomson

A crow monster with no Rinshi Form. He is the servant of Carnisoar. Carden and him created a vortex that would wipe out the entire city. They grew giant and beat the Jungle Pride Megazord because they could fly and avoid even the Elephant's power. Bai Lai targeted Lily, playing unfair. After learning from Master Swoop, Theo took them down with the Jungle Fan. They grew again, and the Rangers destroyed Bai Lai using the Jungle Pride with Bat Power. His broadsword was the only remnant of Bai Lai left and Carden became attached to the item.

===== Carden =====
- First Appearance: "Blind Leading the Blind"
- Voice Actor: Gregory Cooper

A crane monster with no Rinshi form. He is the servant of Carnisoar. He and Bai Lai they created an evil vortex. The duo defeated the Rangers but Theo manage to take them down with the Jungle Fan after being trained by Master Swoop. Carden got thrown unto a mountain by Jungle Pride Megazord with Bat Power and witnessed Bai Lai get destroyed. Carden swore to avenge him, taking his fallen partner's broadsword as a memorial. In "Pushed to the Edge," he faced down Lily and was beaten by her. As a giant, he was easily defeated by the Jungle Pride Megazord with Bat Power.

==== Jellica ====
Jellica is the Sea Overlord and the holder of the Jellyfish spirit, a staff wielding mistress who can neutralize her opponents' physical attacks by having them pass right through her as she can turn into water.

She is revived by Camille so Dai Shi can train under her instead of Carnisoar. However, at first, she forced Camille to be her student and has her attack the Rangers after she personally defeated the Jungle Pride Megazord without trouble. But when Camille couldn't follow her orders, she attacked her with Lily going to her aid followed by Dai Shi, who defeats Jellica in a brief fight. By then, she reveals that her mentoring of Camille was a test to see if Dai Shi truly desired her power, becoming Dai Shi's new mentor, teaching him to harness his deceit as power. She helped Dai Shi and Carnisoar to try killing the Rangers by reviving the White Shadow Guard. She refers to Camille as "Lizard".

When Grizzaka was revived, Jellica sided with him. During the events at the Rhino Nexus, Jellica battles Dominic and overwhelms him with her abilities until he made a comeback and forced her to retreat. While Grizzaka was fighting Theo, Lily, RJ, and Dominic, Jellica attempted to steal the Crystal Eyes while Dai Shi was preoccupied with his fight with Casey. But after Grizzaka's destruction, Jellica reveals she managed to reclaim the three she and Carnisoar gathered for Grizzaka, reviving the Phantom Beast Generals to take over Dai Shi's throne out of spite for him. However, she ends up being destroyed by the three Phantom Beast Generals instead.

She was revived by Dai Shi for the final Beast War, but was destroyed again by the Power Rangers and the Pai Zhua Masters.

Jellica is voiced by Elisabeth Easther.

==== Grizzaka ====
In the episode "Bad To the Bone", Grizzaka is the Land Overlord and holder of the Grizzly bear spirit, master of the power of Zocato that makes him the strongest of the Overlords. He also wears gloves that can sprout claws from the back of his hands; similar to tekko-kagi. After Dai Shi's defeat by the Jungle Master Red Ranger, Carnisoar and Jellica send Camille to revive Grizzaka to increase Dai Shi's power. Carnisoar and Jellica conspire to retrieve Grizzaka from the cave of darkness to their temple. However, being short-tempered, Grizzaka angrily blames Dai Shi for losing the Beast War centuries ago and rejects him even more for using a human as his vessel. Once revived by Camille, whom he attacked until she pleas him to come with her, RJ becomes a Wolf Man as Lily refuses to listen to RJ demands and leave Lily continues to confront Fran to restore Lily back to normal Lily as a biker girl rejoins the rangers to destroy Porcupongo in the Jungle Master Megazord Grizzaka overthrows Dai Shi because of his current status as a human and becomes the new leader with Carnisoar and Jellica switching loyalties out of fear of their well-being. While sending out Rinshi Beasts to battle the rangers, Grizzaka attempts gather the Crystal Eyes to release the Phantom Beasts from their prison. After Jellica captured Dai Shi, he ended up in a facing off against Dai Shi where during the fight, he mentioned that the Control Dagger before defeating Dai Shi with his Zocato.

After Dai Shi and Camille escaped to the Rhino Nexus, Grizaka took Carnisoar and Jellica to catch up to the two. Upon running afoul of the Power Rangers, Grizzaka managed to defeat the Jungle Master Megazord, in both Bat Power and Shark Power forms, before ending up occupied by the Sand Snakes that guarded the Rhino Nexus.

When Dai Shi returned to the temple, Grizzaka was defeated by his refined Zocato and forced to relinquish his leadership. Grizzaka left to gather fear in Ocean Bluff so he can return to power. Grizzaka then fought the Power Rangers while Casey tried to reclaim the Crystal Eyes from Dai Shi. Grizzaka was overwhelming them until Casey arrived. Casey used a combination of the Claw Booster and Dominic's Rhino Morpher to fight Grizzaka before the Rangers use a Claw Cannon/Wolf Morpher/Rhino Blade combo to take him down. Grizzaka grows and the Rangers form the Jungle Master Megazord and the Wolf Pride Megazord. Grizzaka overwhelmed the Megazords until Dominic brings out the Rhino Pride Megazord. Grizzaka then fights the Rhino Pride Megazord and is taken down. The Rangers then charged him down with their new Jungle Stampede formation. Before exploding, Grizzaka voiced his disbelief that he lost, claiming no one was more powerful than him.

He was revived by Dai Shi for the final Beast War, but was destroyed again by the Power Rangers and the Pai Zhua Masters.

Grizzaka is voiced by Derek Judge.

=== Shadow Guards ===
The Shadow Guards are soldier terracotta statues brought to life by the Overlords.

==== Shadow Guard #1 ====
- First Appearance: "Ghost of a Chance" Pt. 1

A Shadow Guard that is modeled after a stag beetle. It was brought to life by Carnisoar. They send them with Dai Shi to reign terror. He was defeated by Jungle Master Yellow Ranger. He was ultimately destroyed in battle by the combined might of the Gorilla, Penguin, and Antelope Zords, but his powers were absorbed by his comrade.

==== Shadow Guard #2 ====
- First Appearance: "Ghost of a Chance" Pt. 1

A Shadow Guard that is modeled after a Hercules beetle. It was brought to life by Jellica. They send them with Dai Shi to reign terror. After the other Shadow Guard was destroyed, he absorbed his powers. He was defeated by Jungle Master Blue Ranger. He was destroyed by the Jungle Master Megazord.

==== Shadow Guards #3 and #4 ====
- First Appearance: "No I in Leader"

In "No I in Leader" Grizzaka brought back to life two more Shadow Guards, they're both black and red in color and modeled after the stag beetle and the Hercules beetle. They battled the Rangers and were able to overwhelm both Lily and Theo. Casey arrived and used a satellite dish to deflect the blast. Casey then used the Jungle Cruiser to attack them, followed by RJ using a double team with Casey. With a combo of the Wolf Beam and the Claw Cannon, the Shadow Guards were defeated. Grizzaka used the power of Zocato to make them grow. The Jungle Master Megazord and the Wolf Zord were having a difficult time defeating them. RJ summoned the Tiger and Jaguar Zords to form the Wolf Pride Megazord. The Wolf Pride Megazord defeated one of the Shadow Guards while the Jungle Master Megazord destroyed the other. In "Now the Final Fury" Dai Shi opened a portal to the Spirit World and summoned these two Shadow Guards once again to battle the Rangers.

=== Rinshi ===
The Rinshi are Dai Shi's army of spear wielding Jiangshi-like foot soldiers used to attack the city and they move by hopping with their arms forward.

==== Rinshi Beasts ====
Certain Rinshi are enhanced by Dai Shi, gaining a new attire and an animal signature on the forehead. These Rinshi can assume the forms of the Rinshi Beasts who fight in the manner of the animal spirit they possess. The Rinshis can grow by gathering fear. After they are destroyed, they normally turn to dust.

- Mantor (voiced by Pat Courtenay) – A Rinshi who holds the spirit of the mantis.
- Buffalord (voiced by Scott Alexander Young) – A Rinshi who holds the spirit of the buffalo. He uses his powerful horns that can bust through thick walls for attacks.
- Pangolin (voiced by Charlie McDermott) – A Rinshi who holds the spirit of the animal with the same name. He can curl up into an armored ball that rolls toward at his opponents, bashing them. As a ball, his armour is impregnable; but got broken apart during his defeat by the Jungle Pride Megazord's Jungle Mace.
- Slickagon (voiced by Robert Mignault) – A Rinshi who holds the spirit of the eel. He is an old friend of Camille who she summoned to help her in her attack on the city. In his beast form, he was covered with shiny slime and spread his slippery slime throughout the city.
- Crustaceo (voiced by Chris Stewart) – A hermit crab monster with no Rinshi form. Jellica called him in to create a hole in the ocean, resulting in a whirlpool. He was defeated by the Jungle Pride Megazord's Shark Sabers.
- Mog (voiced by Oscar Burt-Shearer) – A Rinshi who holds the spirit of the frog. He has the same slime barrier move as Toady and can leap great distances.
- Hamhock (voiced by Stephen Lovatt) – A Rinshi who holds the spirit of the pig. Camille sent him to keep the Rangers busy. He was defeated by the Jungle Master Megazord's Shark Sabers.
- Porcupongo (voiced by Peter Ford) – A Rinshi who holds the spirit of the porcupine. The quills he launches can increase someone's aggression. He also can turn his hands into quills. He was defeated by the Jungle Pride Megazord's Jungle Mace.
- Monkeywi (voiced by Glen Bullen) – A baboon monster with no Rinshi form. He was defeated by the Wolf Pride Megazord.
- Barrakooza (voiced by Campbell Cooley) – An archerfish monster with no Rinshi form. He can shoot water from the nozzles mounted on his forearms.
- Crocovile (voiced by Paul Norell) – A Rinshi who holds the spirit of the crocodile. He was defeated by Dominic.
- Whirnado (voiced by Stefan Davern) – An ostrich monster with no Rinshi form. He has a super-speed ability.
  - Whiricane (voiced by Nic Sampson) – Before Whirnado was destroyed, he laid an egg. When this egg hatched, Whiricane was born. Whiricane was able to spread its wings, using his super-speed and/or launching its feathers.
- Cheese McAllistar (portrayed by Jason Hoyte) – Cheese McAllister is a Rinshi who lured the Jungle Fury Rangers into his TV Dimension to compete in a game show called Blow That Dough hosted by himself and Camille. His plan was to "cancel" all of the Jungle Fury Rangers every time a Rinshi Beast got a question right, or when one of the Rangers themselves got a question wrong or did something worth getting them cancelled. His plans are foiled however, when Casey retrieves his remote and transports him and his teammates back to the real world. His name implies that his animal spirit is that of the mouse.
- Fox Monster – A fox monster with no Rinshi form. He was revived by Dai Shi alongside the Phantom Beasts, the red Shadow Guards, the Overlords, and the Five Fingers of Poison.
- Anglerfish Monster – An anglerfish monster with no Rinshi form. He was revived by Dai Shi alongside the Phantom Beasts, the red Shadow Guards, the Overlords, and the Five Fingers of Poison.

=== Phantom Beast Generals ===
Grizzaka already had the 3 Crystal Eyes that held the 3 main Phantom Beast Generals in the series that represented the Snapping Turtle, White Tiger, and Avalon Dragon. Though Jellica revives them, the three of them destroy her in an act of treachery to swear their allegiance to Dai Shi offering their warriors to his cause while asking Dai Shi to become their Phantom Beast King. He initially turns them down as they previously been his enemies but orders them to bring Master Phant, Master Swoop and Master Finn to prove their loyalty, creating the Spirit Rangers from the masters' animal spirits. They, along with Camille being made into a Phantom Beast General representing the Phoenix, have motifs based on the Four Sacred Beasts. They were all eventually destroyed until they were revived by Dai Shi for the final Beast War, but were destroyed again by the Power Rangers and the Pai Zhua Masters.

==== Scorch ====
Scorch is a Phantom Beast with a Hydra-motif who holds the spirit of the Azure Dragon, emerging from the Crystal Eye that represents it. Scorch also has a Japanese accent. He kidnapped Master Swoop and used his Rinzin Power and the Crystal Eye to turn Master Swoop's animal spirit into the Bat Spirit Ranger. Scorch joined Dai Shi, Camille, Whiger, and Snapper in fighting the Rangers and easily defeated them. After Whiger was stripped of rank and destroyed, Scorch started to doubt Dai Shi's ability to suppress his human host due to Camille. This led to him and Snapper both secretly scheming to do something about it, from sabotaging Camille's plan with Grinder to sending Sonimax, Osiris, and Lepus to assassinate her. It was after the three failed, that Dai Shi beats Scorch while assuring him he's still in control. When Jarrod breaks free, Scorch is sent by Dai Shi to destroy both him and Camille, only to be defeated by the Jungle Pride Charge with Lion and Chameleon Power. He survived to spearhead Dai Shi's army for the final battle, easily defeating RJ and Dominic, along Masters Phant, Swoop and Finn, before being destroyed by the Rangers' Triple Claw attack. He was revived by Dai Shi for the final Beast War, but was destroyed again by the Power Rangers and the Pai Zhua Masters.

Scorch is voiced by Mark Wright.

==== Snapper ====
Snapper is a Phantom Beast General with a Basilisk-motif who holds the spirit of the Snapping Turtle, emerging from the Crystal Eye that represents it. Snapper possesses Rinzin that alters the gravity around him, using it to render his opponents powerless to its effects. Lily first encountered him trying to kidnap Master Phant and Snapper overwhelmed her. He then made off with Master Phant. Snapper appeared in the battle between the Megazords and Sonimax. Snapper then used his gravitational Rinzin Power to easily defeat the Megazords and he takes his leave with Sonimax. Snapper then used his Rinzin Power and the Crystal Eye to turn Master Phant's animal spirit into the Elephant Spirit Ranger. He alongside Dai Shi, Camille, and Scorch joined Whiger in fighting the Rangers and easily defeated the Rangers. After Whiger had his Rinzin stolen from him, and was stripped of his rank and destroyed, Snapper begins to secretly aid Scorch in his plot against Camille for Dai Shi's sake. Later when Jarrod breaks free of Dai Shi, Snapper aids Scorch in hunting down him and Camille, only to be destroyed by her and the other rangers while Casey and Jarrod battle Scorch. He was revived by Dai Shi for the final Beast War, but was destroyed again by the Power Rangers and the Pai Zhua Masters.

Snapper is voiced by Richard Simpson.

==== Whiger ====
Whiger is a Chimera Phantom Beast who holds the spirit of the White Tiger, emerging from the Crystal Eye that represents it. He kidnapped Master Finn and used his Rinzin Power and the Crystal Eye to turn Master Finn's animal spirit into the Shark Spirit Ranger. After the Spirit Rangers were freed from the Phantom Beast Generals' control, Dai Shi noticed that Whiger's spirit is similar to the Red Ranger's spirit. Dai Shi uses him to redeem the Phantom Beasts by taking Casey's Tiger Spirit. He succeeded in getting it for Dai Shi after a scuffle with RJ. Whiger proves his victory to Dai Shi by sparring with him (thus allowing Dai Shi to accept the Generals). Whiger called a fight with Casey, but ended up fighting RJ, Theo, Lily, and Dominic until Dai Shi, Camille, and the other Phantom Beast Generals arrive and easily defeat the Rangers. Whiger attacked the city and Casey ran into him. Casey tried to transform without his Tiger Spirit and ended up fighting the other Rangers. Casey finally transforms and joins the fight. With the help of Jimmy, the Rangers charged up the Claw Cannon to use on Whiger. Whiger grows and fights the Wolf Pride Megazord, the Rhino Pride Megazord, and Jungle Master Megazord, losing to them when they form the Jungle Master Stampede. Dai Shi did not take the news of Whiger's defeat lightly. He stripped Whiger of his Rinzin, title, and rank before banishing Whiger from the temple. Whiger tried to kill Casey, for robbing him of his honor only to be saved by the human when he fell off a cliff. Deciding to return his kindness, Whiger lead Casey to where Rammer and Badrat were holding everyone captive, including the other rangers. While battling Camille, Whiger gave Casey back his tiger spirit and the two performed a double attack on Camille (with Whiger manifesting a white version of Casey's Tiger Spirit) forcing her to leave in defeat. However, the fight depleted the last of Whiger's Rinzin causing him to fade out of existence but not from Casey's memory. His last words were, "Dai Shi has proven to be my enemy. You, you have proven to be my friend. You must destroy them for all Tigers!"

Whiger is voiced by Jared Turner.

===== Phantom Beasts =====
The eight Phantom Beasts were a notorious race of mythology-based monsters back in the "Beast War", who not only attacked humans but attempted to overthrow Dai Shi. They are able to generate Rinzin, a power that surpasses Zocato. The Pai Zhua masters sealed them away in the Crystal Eyes and these items are what can bring them back to life under a star alignment. Five of the Crystal Eyes were found by Dr. Silvia Jennings and ended up in the possession of the Power Rangers. The generals contained within them were thus never released. The lower-ranking Phantom Beasts are servants of the Phantom Beast Generals and are not in the same category as the Rinshi Beasts. They have motifs based on the Earthly Branches; pig, ox, horse, goat, rat, monkey, dog, rabbit.

====== Sonimax ======
- First Appearance: "Fear and the Phantoms"
- Voice Actor: John Callen

A cetus-motif Phantom Beast Warrior who holds the spirit of the Boar. Sonimax uses a sound-based Rinzin attack. He overpowers the boys until Lily joined the battle after her failure to stop Snapper from kidnapping Master Phant. Sonimax was taken down by a group attack and grew. Jungle Master Megazord, Wolf Pride Megazord, and Rhino Pride Megazord were formed. Sonimax was too tough for the Megazords until Lily summoned the Elephant Zord to form the Jungle Master Megazord with Elephant Power. Snapper entered the battle and defeated the Megazords. Sonimax retreated with Snapper.

In "To Earn Your Stripes," he, Lepus, and Osiris were sent by Snapper and Scorch to kill Camille, making them believe she conspired against Dai Shi and Dai Shi ordered it to be done. As they attack her, Jarrod came in to save her and destroyed him in the Phantom Beast King form.

In "Now the Final Fury," Dai Shi opened a portal to the Spirit World which brought back Sonimax. He was defeated by the Rangers and their masters.

====== Dynamir ======
- First Appearance: "Fear and the Phantoms"
- Voice Actor: Geoff Houtman

A Minotaur-motif Phantom Beast Warrior who holds the spirit of the Ox. Dynamir has a Rinzin Power that enables him to trap his victims in mirror plates.

In "Blue Ranger, Twin Danger," he turned the Rangers and Theo's twin into mirror plates. He fights alongside the Spirit Rangers at Scorch's orders. After that, Theo attacks Dynamir and drops the mirror plates which turn everybody back to normal. Dynamir later grows and fights the Rhino Pride Megazord and defeats the Jungle Master Megazord. The Wolf Pride Megazord with Bat Power and the Rhino Pride Megazord destroys Dynamir for good.

In "Now the Final Fury," Dai Shi opened a portal to the Spirit World and brought Dynamir back. He was defeated by the Rangers and their masters.

====== Unidoom ======
- First Appearance: "Fear and the Phantoms"
- Voice Actor: David Capstick

A unicorn-motif Phantom Beast Warrior who holds the spirit of the Horse.

In "One Last Second Chance," he was sent to throw a Crystal Eye in the ocean containing Master Finn. After the Power Rangers rescued Master Phant and Master Swoop from Dai Shi's Temple, Unidoom was destroyed by the Spirit Rangers.

In "Now the Final Fury," Dai Shi opened a portal to the Spirit World and brought Unidoom back. He was defeated by the Rangers and their masters.

====== Rammer ======
- First Appearance: "Fear and the Phantoms"
- Voice Actor: Andrew Robertt

A sea goat-motif Phantom Beast Warrior who holds the spirit of the Goat and often uses rhymes when he speaks.

In "The Spirit of Kindness," he and Badrat sprinkled people and the four Rangers with powder to shrink them into rat traps. Doing battle, Rammer is giant and switched places with Badrat. He and Badrat were defeated by Casey with the Rhino Claw combo and then fully destroyed by all 11 Animal Spirits.

In "Now the Final Fury," Dai Shi opened a portal to the Spirit World and brought Rammer back. He fought alongside Badrat and was defeated by the Rangers and their masters.

====== Badrat ======
- First Appearance: "Fear and the Phantoms"
- Voice Actor: Ian Hughes

An afanc-motif Phantom Beast Warrior who holds the spirit of the Rat and often uses rhymes when he speaks.

In "The Spirit of Kindness," he and Rammer sprinkled people and the four Rangers with powder to shrink them into rat traps. Doing battle, Rammer is giant and switched places with Badrat. He and Runner were defeated by Casey with the Rhino Claw combo and then fully destroyed by the Jungle Pride Charge.

In "Now the Final Fury," Dai Shi opened a portal to the Spirit World and brought Badrat back. He fought alongside Rammer and was defeated by the Rangers and their masters.

====== Grinder ======
- First Appearance: "Fear and the Phantoms"
- Voice Actor: Darren Young

A Hanuman-motif Phantom Beast Warrior who holds the spirit of the Monkey.

In "Maryl and the Monkeys," Camille and her Rinshi stole a cloning formula from a scientist named Maryl Snyder and used it on Grinder enabling him to clone himself. Unfortunately, a side effect of the formula gave Grinder a bad case of itching. Camille wanted him to conceal himself, but Scorch went to his hiding spot and told him to find the Rangers. Scorch informed Fran who told Dominic where Grinder was hiding. Dominic went one-on-one with the main monkey. He defeated Grinder, but Grinder grew big and was frozen by a special ice attack from the Rhino Steel and destroyed by the Jungle Master Stampede.

In "Now the Final Fury," Dai Shi opened a portal to the Spirit World and brought Grinder back. He was defeated by the Rangers and their masters.

====== Osiris ======
- First Appearance: "Fear and the Phantoms"
- Voice Actor: Nick Kemplen

A Cerberus-motif Phantom Beast Warrior who holds the spirit of the Dog.

In "To Earn Your Stripes," he, Lepus, and Sonimax were sent by Snapper and Scorch to kill Camille, making them believe she conspired against Dai Shi and Dai Shi ordered it to be done. As they attack her. Jarrod came in to save her and destroyed him in the Phantom Beast King form.

In "Now the Final Fury," Dai Shi opened a portal to the Spirit World and brought Osiris back. He was defeated by the Rangers and their masters.

====== Lepus ======
- First Appearance: "Fear and the Phantoms"
- Voice Actor: Sarah Thomson

A pixie-motif Phantom Beast Warrior who holds the spirit of the Rabbit.

In "To Earn Your Stripes," she, Osiris, and Sonimax were sent by Snapper and Scorch to kill Camille, making them believe she conspired against Dai Shi and Dai Shi ordered it to be done. As they attack her, Jarrod came in to save her and she ran off. Lepus then caught Casey and fought him in hopes that Dai Shi would forgive her. He used his Strike Rider against her. Scorch and Snapper then came in to fight him. She called them out about their deception, but they made it seem as if they would all in the same boat against Dai Shi. She grew giant and was defeated by the Jungle Spirits Stampede.

In "Now the Final Fury," Dai Shi opened a portal to the Spirit World and brought Lepus back. She was defeated by the Rangers and their masters.
