= Anna Hutchison =

New Zealand actress and producer (born 1986)

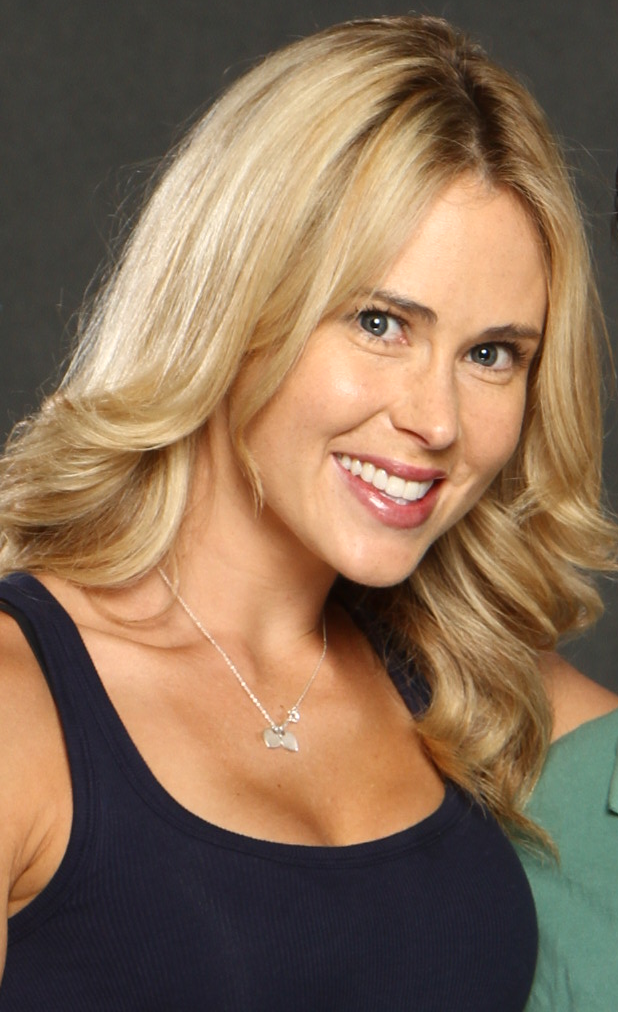
- Hutchison at the 2014 Florida SuperCon
- Born: 8 February 1986 (age 40); Auckland, New Zealand
- Occupations: Actress; producer
- Years active: 2002–present
- Spouse: Mike Gillespie (m. 2018)
- Children: 2

Anna Hutchison (born 8 February 1986) is a New Zealand actress and producer. Her roles include Delphi Greenlaw on Shortland Street (2002–04); Lily Chilman, the Jungle Fury Yellow Ranger on Power Rangers Jungle Fury (2008); Allison Dine on Underbelly: A Tale of Two Cities (2009); Amy Smart on Go Girls (2009–12); Jules Louden in The Cabin in the Woods (2012); Laeta on Spartacus: War of the Damned (2013); Sasha on Anger Management (2013–14) and Kim in The Right Girl (2015).

== Career ==
Hutchison's career began on the New Zealand soap opera Shortland Street and continued in the American series Power Rangers Jungle Fury. She also played Allison Dine, the girlfriend of crime figure Terry Clark in the Australian television series Underbelly: A Tale of Two Cities also known as Underbelly: The Mr Asia Story, and Amy Smart in the New Zealand television comedy-drama series Go Girls. In 2012, she starred in the Joss Whedon-Drew Goddard meta-fictional slasher film The Cabin in the Woods.

On 13 April 2012, it was announced that Hutchison would be joining the cast of Spartacus for the third season in 2013, in a main role as Laeta, a Roman taken prisoner by Spartacus.

== Filmography ==
=== Film ===
Year	Title	Role	Notes
2006	The Lost One	Emma	Short film
2006	Wendy Wu: Homecoming Warrior	Lisa	Disney Channel movie
2011	Panic at Rock Island	VJ Pilly	TV movie
2011	The Cabin in the Woods	Jules Louden	Feature film
2012	Rotting Hill	Lizzy	Short film
2013	Blinder	Rose Walton	Feature film
2015	Call to Duty	Sarah Williams	
2015	The Right Girl	Kimberly	
2015	Wrecker	Emily	Feature film
2015	The Night Before	Kayla	
2015	Sugar Mountain	Angie Miller	Feature film
2016	Drive By	Lisa	Short film
2016	Wrong Swipe	Anna	Lifetime TV movie
2016	Cup of Love	Zoe	TV movie
2016	A Firehouse Christmas	Jenny	Film
2017	Vengeance: A Love Story	Teena	Feature film
2018	Encounter	Jessica Flemming	Feature film
2019	Robert the Bruce	Morag	Feature film
2019	Secrets of the Lake	Megan Myers	TV movie
2019	Starting Up Love	Jillian	
2021	A Love Yarn	Sophie Markham	TV movie

=== Television ===
Year	Title	Role	Notes
2002–04	Shortland Street	Delphi Greenlaw (main role)	TV series
2006	Orange Roughies	Anja	TV series, episodes: 1.1, 1.2
2007	Ride with the Devil	"Pony" Gemmel (main role)	TV series
2008	Power Rangers Jungle Fury	Lily Chilman / Jungle Fury Yellow Ranger (main role)	TV series, 32 episodes
2008	Legend of the Seeker	Bronwyn	TV series, episode: "Identity"
2009	Underbelly: A Tale of Two Cities	Allison Dine (main role)	TV miniseries, 13 episodes
2009–12	Go Girls	Amy Smart (main role)	TV series, 37 episodes
2011	Sea Patrol	Jodie	TV series, episode: "The Hunted"
2011	Wild Boys	Emilia Fife (main role)	TV series, 10 episodes
2013	Spartacus: War of the Damned	Laeta (main role)	TV series, 9 episodes
2014	Auckland Daze	Anna	TV series, episode: 2.5
2013–14	Anger Management	Sasha (recurring role)	TV series, 6 episodes
2017	Amero Squad	Agent Andrea (female version of Odd Squad)	

== Awards ==
Year	Award	Film	Result
2004	New Zealand Television & Film Award for Best Juvenile Actor in a Television Series	Shortland Street	Nominated
2004	TV Guide Best on the Box People's Choice Award for Rising Star	Shortland Street	Won
2004	TV Guide Best on the Box People's Choice Award for Best Actress	Shortland Street	Nominated
2005	TV Guide Best on the Box People's Choice Award for Best Actress	Shortland Street	Nominated
2006	New Zealand Screen Award for Best Performance in a Short Film	The Lost One	Nominated
2010	Logie Award for Most Outstanding New Talent	Underbelly: A Tale of Two Cities	Nominated
