= Edwin Greenlaw =

American scholar and educator

Edwin Almiron Greenlaw (April 6, 1874 – September 10, 1931) was an American scholar and educator.

A.B. (1897) and M.A. (1898) in history from the Northwestern University, unsolicited M.A. in English (1903) from Harvard University, and Ph.D. in English (1904) from Harvard.

He was on the advisory board of the Guggenheim Foundation from its inception in 1925 until his death.

== Books ==
- A Syllabus of English Literature (1912)
- Outline of the Literature of the English Renaissance (1916)
- Builders of Democracy (1918)
- The Province of Literary History (1931)
- Studies in Spenser's Historical Allegory (1932)
