= Shane Cortese =

New Zealand actor and singer

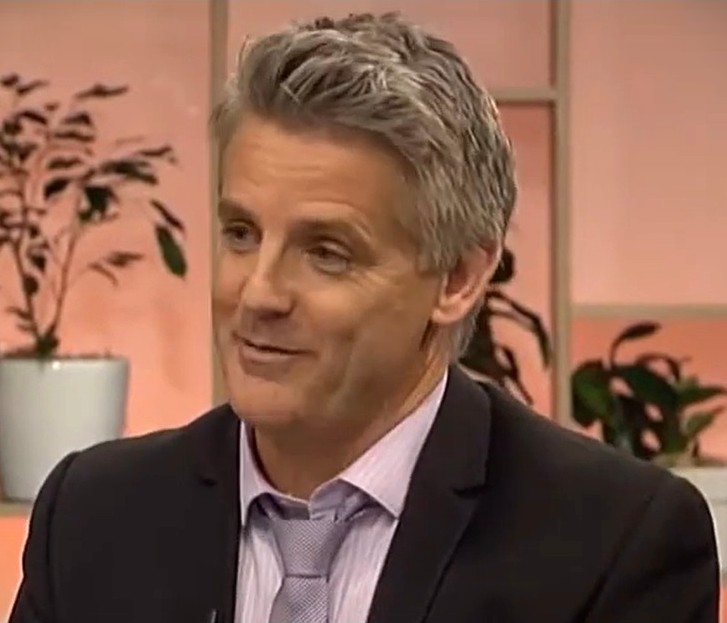
- Cortese in 2017
- Born: 13 August 1968 (age 58); Wellington, New Zealand
- Education: Royal Central School of Speech and Drama
- Occupation: Actor
- Spouse: Nerida Cortese (m. 2009; div. 2019)
- Children: 3

Shane Cortese (born 13 August 1968) is a New Zealand actor and singer. He is perhaps best known for his role of Mac on Nothing Trivial, Loki on the Almighty Johnsons and Hayden Peters on the hit show Outrageous Fortune. He was also a runner-up on Season 1 of NZ Dancing with the Stars in 2005.

== Career ==
Cortese started his professional career as a travel agent in Palmerston North. He got involved in the amateur drama society and soon found a passion in acting. He participated in numerous plays before moving to London in 1993 to further his newfound career. Cortese trained at London's Central School of Speech and Drama. After graduating from the Musical Theatre Course in 1993, he spent 10 years touring the UK in musicals, performing several times on London's prestigious West End. His performances won critical acclaim from UK reviewers.

Whilst visiting New Zealand in 2000, Cortese auditioned for the popular soap opera Shortland Street for the role of Geoff Greenlaw. He did not receive the part and returned to England to star in the West End. He scored a major part in a production but was contacted by Shortland Street producers who announced their intention to write a character specifically for him who was to play a major part in the serial. Cortese relished the opportunity and returned to New Zealand to take the part, despite being threatened by those involved in the West End play that he would never work again. Cortese made his Shortland Street debut in early 2003 as the character of Dominic Thompson. The character stayed on screen for just under 2 years, before dying in one of the show's most iconic and well-received storylines.

On 29 April 2005, he starred on the New Zealand version of Dancing with the Stars. Partnered with dancer Nerida Lister, he was named runner-up on 20 June 2005. He scored a guest starring role in fantasy series Maddigan's Quest and played the lead character, "John" opposite British actress Zöe Lucker on stage in Then Comes Love. In late 2005, after appearing on Dancing with the Stars he hosted TV3's So You Think You Can Dance. In 2006 he returned to his bad boy ways, playing Hayden Peters on Rachel Lang and James Griffin's Outrageous Fortune. Cortese was pleased to have scored the title role in Burying Brian, only to discover his character was to be killed off in the first episode.

Cortese is also the patron for ACTA (Auckland City Theatre Academy), a youth theatre company training students aged 5–18 in musical theatre. He appeared with the students in The North Shore Times in an article describing his involvement with the school and its students. In 2011 Cortese joined the cast of comedy-drama Nothing Trivial as the character of Mac. He was nominated in the prestigious Monte-Carlo Television Festival for "Best Actor" for his role. Cortese also landed the role of Loki in another of Griffin's creations, The Almighty Johnsons, a role he maintained for the show's three season run.

In November 2026 he was presented with the Scroll of Honour from the Variety Artists Club of New Zealand for his contribution to New Zealand entertainment.

== Personal life ==
In January 2006, Cortese and his Dancing with the Stars partner Nerida Lister announced they were dating, then in 2006, New Idea magazine announced that they were expecting their first baby. In April 2007, Kees Armas Cortese was born by water birth at North Shore Hospital. The first exclusive photos of Kees were shown in the New Zealand magazine New Idea a month after his birth. Shane and Nerida became engaged on 26 February 2008 and later married in early 2009. In 2008 Cortese was contacted by a 15-year-old girl that he discovered was his daughter from a past relationship. Shane and Nerida welcomed a second son in July 2011 named Jett Patrick Cortese. In 2019, Shane and Nerida Cortese split after 10 years of marriage.

A very keen cricketer, he was educated at Tauranga Boys' College and was in the 1st XI from 1981 to 1985.

Cortese remains close friends with his Shortland Street screen brother Michael Galvin.

== Filmography ==
=== Film ===
Title	Year	Role	Notes
Inside	2006	Michael	Short film

=== Television ===
Title	Year	Role	Notes
Joseph 2000	2000	Pharaoh	Television film
SCU: Serious Crash Unit	2001–15	Himself – Narrator	
Shortland Street	2003–2004	Dominic Thompson	Main role
Dancing with the Stars	2005	Himself – Contestant	
Maddigan's Quest	2006	Timon's Father	Episode: "Hillfolk"
So You Think You Can Dance	2006	Himself – Host	
Outrageous Fortune	2006–10	Hayden Peters	Recurring role (seasons 2–3; 21 episodes), main role (seasons 4–6; 34 episodes)
The Jaquie Brown Diaries	2008	Himself	Episode: "Brown Sweat"
Burying Brian	2008	Brian Welch	Main role
Legend of the Seeker	2009	Morwyn	Episode: "Marked"
Brown Bruthaz	2011	Victor Benton	Main role
The Almighty Johnsons	2011–13	Colin Gunderson	Recurring role (16 episodes)
Nothing Trivial	2011–14	Mac Delany	Main role (31 episodes); Nominated – Golden Nymph Award for Outstanding Actor in a Drama Series (2012)
Auckland Daze	2013–14	Shane	3 episodes
The Brokenwood Mysteries	2015–present	Dennis Buchanan	Recurring role (season 2–present; 10 episodes)
Step Dave	2015	Eugene Russell	Recurring role (season 2; 6 episodes)
Westside	2017–18	Danny Peters	7 episodes

Preceded by Show Started	Dancing with the Stars (New Zealand) runner up Season 1 (2005 with Nerida Lister)	Succeeded by Beatrice Faumuina & Brian Jones
