= Sea Patrol season 3 =

Sea Patrol
- Season 3
- Advertisement for season 3
- No. of episodes: 13

Release
- Original network: Nine Network
- Original release: 18 May – 27 July 2009

Season chronology
- ← Previous; Season 2 Next → Season 4

The third season of the Australian drama Sea Patrol premiered as Sea Patrol 3: Red Gold on the Nine Network on 18 May 2009. Principal location filming was, as in past seasons, completed in and around the area of Mission Beach, Queensland. It has an announced budget of A$17 million. The continued presence of the production in north Queensland has been hailed as "a major boon for our local film and television industry" by Rod Welford, the Queensland Minister for Education, Training and the Arts. Sea Patrol season 3 finished filming in mid-February. The series kicked off with ET (David Lyons) being killed in a diving accident. Sea Patrol 3 still has the Armidale Class Patrol Boat. Two new recurring stars Blair McDonough and Jessica Napier played a married couple, Matt and Simone Robsenn who are the local dive masters. Sea Patrol season 3 premiered on 18 May 2009. It aired every Monday night on Channel 9 at 8.30.

== Casting ==
=== Main cast ===
Actor	Character	Rank	Position
Ian Stenlake	Mike "CO" Flynn RAN	Lieutenant-Commander	Commanding Officer
Lisa McCune	Kate "XO" McGregor RAN	Lieutenant	Executive officer
Saskia Burmeister	Nikki "Nav" Caetano	Lieutenant	Navigator
John Batchelor	Andy "Charge" Thorpe	Chief Petty Officer	Chief Engineer
Matthew Holmes	Chris "Swain" Blake	Petty Officer	Coxswain/Chief Medic
Jeremy Lindsay Taylor	Pete "Buffer" Tomaszewski	Petty Officer	Lead Boatswain or ship's Buffer
Kristian Schmid	Robert "RO" Dixon	Leading Seaman	Radio Operator
David Lyons	Josh "ET" Holiday	Leading Seaman	Electronics Technician (Episode 27)
Nikolai Nikolaeff	Leo "2Dads" Kosov-Meyer	Leading Seaman	Electronics Technician (Episodes 28–39)
Kirsty Lee Allan	Rebecca "Bomber" Brown	Able Seaman	Chef/Assistant Medic
Jay Ryan	Billy "Spider" Webb	Seaman	Boatswain's Mate

=== Recurring cast ===
Actor	Character
Steve Bisley	Commander Steven 'Steve' Marshall
Andrew Buchanan	Campbell Fulton
Jessica Napier	Simone Robsenn
Blair McDonough	Matt Robsenn

== Episodes ==
No. overall	No. in season	Title	Directed by	Written by	Original release date	AUS viewers (millions)
27	1	"Catch and Release"	Ian Barry	Adam H Todd	18 May 2009	1.33
HMAS Hammersley is dragged into a web of murder, piracy and eco-terrorism, when valuable "Red Gold" coral is stolen from a dive boat. Season 3 picks up where season 2 left off and sees HMAS Hammersley tasked with protecting the oil rigs on the Pacific Shelf. When an FFV is spotted approaching one of the rigs the fear is terrorism, but upon boarding the boat the crew finds a lone fisherman who has been badly beaten and tied to the wheel. Collapsing into the arms of ET the fisherman dies uttering the word Hantu. ET is clearly upset by the man's death and later tells Nikki that he has decided to leave the NAVY to work for a local dive Company, meaning they can be together at last, and he asks her to marry him. Three days later, what begins as a routine patrol turns to tragedy when Hammersley is tasked to look for eight missing divers off of Red Reef. Nikki is suspicious as ET has not reported back for duty on the ship, and the worst fears are realised when the crew finds all eight divers washed ashore dead, among them the body of ET. The crew is devastated and Mike asks to be allowed to help find out what happened. The search leads them to an FFV, which is carrying cargo from the dive boat, although the fishermen claim innocence in the deaths. Swain and Spider stay aboard to steam the FFV back to Cairns, but their journey is suddenly interrupted by a band of eco-terrorists who are hell bent on revenge on all foreign fisherman. The seamen are taken captive and find out this is the mysterious Hantu, the man responsible for the death of the fisherman near the oil rigs. Placed in an impossible situation they manage to convince the captain to steer into the path of Hammersley where they have some hope of rescue and maybe some chance of answers about ET's death. Guest actors: Blair McDonough, Jessica Napier, Robert Coleby
28	2	"Monkey Business"	Steve Mann	Felicity Packard	25 May 2009	1.385
Hammersley gets a new crewmate: Leading Seaman Leo Cosov-Meyer (2-Dads) who has managed to steal a monkey and smuggle it on board. When valuables start to go missing the crew blame 2-Dads for the theft, he tries to protest his innocence all the while knowing the real thief is in fact, the monkey. The boarding of an FFV reunites 2-Dads with the owner of the monkey who are none to pleased to see him, and take him, Nikki and Charge hostage. 2-Dads manages to free himself and jump overboard but keep hold of the rigging, and is thus able to get back aboard the FFV and assist with he rescue of Charge and Nikki. Quite pleased with himself, and expecting to be praised for his heroics he is disappointed when the NAV sees through his plan and tells him straight that she knows he only did it to save himself. 2-Dads realises he has a few bridges to build in order to earn the respect of his shipmates, and things have so far not started well.
29	3	"China Dolls"	Ian Barry	Philip Dalkin	1 June 2009	1.282
A suspected FFV turns out to be smuggling immigrants from China into Australian waters. All the immigrants are young attractive women, and one of them has just gone into labour. Kate is immediately suspicious that the women are being smuggled into the sex trade, and tries everything in her power to find an alternative to simply turning the boat away, knowing they will try again as soon as Hammersley is out of sight. Meanwhile, Swain has taken over care of the pregnant woman. She is suffering severe complications with the birth and despite all his efforts she dies before giving birth, leaving Swain with no choice but to cut her open to save her unborn child. The ordeal pushes Swain to the limit of his skills. The death of the mother affects him greatly, so much so he is unwilling to even hold or look at her baby, which has survived. In an effort to make up for her inability to help the women on the boat, Kate goes out of her way to trace the family of the orphaned baby, but her investigations lead her straight to the people smugglers. The resulting pursuit and apprehension of the smugglers gives Swain the chance to work out some of the anguish from the death of the mother, and finally reunites the baby with his aunt. Guest actors: Hsiao Ling Tang, Ling-Hsueh Tang, Masa Yamaguchi
30	4	"Guns"	Steve Mann	John Ridley	8 June 2009	1.366
Mike and Spider are taken hostage during a shoot-out with weapons smugglers. Kate fears her past relationship with Mike will become public knowledge when an ex-naval lieutenant is rescued and brought aboard, but his presence on the boat leads to shocking consequences for the crew, and in particular Charge. Guest actors: Blair McDonough, Jessica Napier, Sullivan Stapleton, Steve Bisley, Jared Robinson, Nigel Poulton,
31	5	"Ghost Net"	Ian Barry	Jeff Truman	15 June 2009	1.358
Nikki starts investigating the mystery behind ET's death. But can she handle the truth when Hammersley rescues an old enemy following a bizarre diving accident? Spider befriends a young boy who is being used as the diver on an illegal fishing boat and goes out of his way to help, when he finds out the boy is a mute and, in fact, a child slave. When the young boy starts showing signs of the Bends decompression sickness, Swain has to put aside his personal feelings and work with Campbell Fulton to save the boy with a second dive. Guest actors: Joel Lok, Blair McDonough, Andrew Buchanan
32	6	"Oh Danny Boy"	Steve Mann	John Ridley	22 June 2009	1.309
The crew of Hammersley are enjoying some shore leave, and 2-Dads tries to help the RO by introducing him to one of the local "ladies". RO is horrified when Danielle turns out to be Danny and is furious with 2-Dads for setting him up. But before he can get back to the ship he overhears a conversation about an attack on the shipment of nuclear waste Hammersley is protecting. Caught eavesdropping he makes a frantic run for cover with the help of a golf buggy from the local hotel, but when he crashes rather publicly into the water trap on the golf course he is quickly arrested and escorted away by the police. 2-Dads is none too happy when he is forced to give up his winnings from a recent poker match to help pay off the damage RO has caused and the pair immediately come to blows. When a bomb is discovered on board, however, RO and 2-Dads must set aside their differences to save Hammersley. Buffer falls victim to a practical joke, and is none too pleased with Spider.
33	7	"Half Life"	Steve Mann	John Ridley	29 June 2009	1.333
When the crew are called upon to rescue the crew of a crashed helicopter, they must risk exposure to toxic radiation when the crash site turns out to be an old British nuclear test site. Swain's courage is called into question when he asks to be left out of the high-risk rescue operation and Bomber is sent instead, but he is forced to face his fears and a potentially dangerous dose of radiation when Bomber loses her footing and falls into the crater created by the nuclear blast. Charge digs into the history of the island and uncovers a military conspiracy over the nuclear testing and a long-lost B-25 bomber with her crew still inside. Guest actors: Ron Kelly (as Walker), Kurt Duval (as Setiawan), Brooke Harman (as Jessica), Shea Adams (as Swain Stunt Double), Nicole Downes (as Bomber Stunt Double), Aston Crabtree (as Bomber Stunt Double).
34	8	"Red Sky Morning"	Ian Barry	Tony Morphett	6 July 2009	1.215
A mysterious cargo ship is steering directly towards some of the Hammersley crew who are enjoying some time off the boat snorkelling. Unable to get out of its path in time, Spider is washed underneath and thankful when his only injury is a minor cut on his leg from some coral. Going after the boat, they find it abandoned and on auto-pilot, so while Hammersley leaves to search the area for survivors, Kate, Buffer, 2-Dads and Lieutenant Cliff Bailey stay on board to escort the boat back to port. All appears to be going well, but then the radio goes missing, and the following morning the only trace of Lt' Bailey are his dog-tags and some blood. Plus, they are now more than 100 miles of course. Meanwhile, on Hammersley Spider's minor injury has turned into a serious case of coral poisoning, and Swain fears it could be fatal. Unable to locate the cargo-ship with the XO on board Hammersley must return to port to get help for Spider. When Buffer and 2-Dads start a second search for Lt. Bailey they become trapped in the food storage, and someone has turned the temperature down. Kate is now alone with no-one to help her and the mysterious stowaway is out to get them all. Buffer and 2-Dads are facing a freezing demise and Kate is terrorised by the crazed stalker. Guest actors: Ian Roberts (as Nathan Talbot), Bren Foster as (Lieutenant Cliff Bailey), Sam Clark (as Dave Corran), John Reynolds (as Nathan Talbot Stunt Double).
35	9	"Pearls Before Swine"	Ian Barry	Matt Ford	13 July 2009	1.350
Hammersley hunts down a mysterious gang of armed robbers who are terrorising pearl luggers off the WA coast, but is there more to the attacks than meets the eye. Spider and Buffer have a trippy encounter with some hard-partying drug smugglers. 2-Dads faces disciplinary action for negligence when the smugglers get away because he has forgotten to fuel the RHIB's. But when he tries to retaliate by starting rumours that Kate and Buffer are romantically involve Mike is forced to intervene, and he ends up in more trouble, and facing possible dismissal from the NAVY. Thankfully Kate has a more creative punishment in mind. Guest actors: Grant Piro (as Fennelly), Luke Pegler (as Hammil), Jacki Mison (as Tagan), Chris Baz (as Prendergast), Peter Marshall (as Chappel), Shea Adams (as Jetski Stunt Rider), Mark Tearle (as Jetski Stunt Rider)
36	10	"Safeguard"	Steve Mann	Jeff Truman	20 July 2009	1.281
Hammersley is stranded in a deadly minefield after being attacked by heavily armed smugglers, and the NAVY call out one of their mine sweepers to assist with the clear-up. Charge goes to extreme lengths to earn the respect of his estranged son who is now a midshipman on the Mine sweeper. Buffer gets a lesson in tough love from a sexy training officer, but her lessons are put into practice when one of the mines detonates under the hull of the Mine sweeper and the crew are involved in a sailor's worst nightmare – fire at sea. Guest actors: Steve Bisley (as CMDR Steve Marshall).
37	11	"Secret Cargo"	Ian Barry	Adam H Todd	20 July 2009	1.197
A terrifying rescue sees Bomber risk her own life to help a young couple escape from their capsized yacht. But her elation turns into a tragic mystery when the boyfriend dies suddenly on board Hammersley. The mystery deepens when it is discovered that the body has been mutilated post-mortem to get to the drugs the tourist had been smuggling, could his girlfriend really be responsible? Bomber and RO fight for their lives when an armed gang tries to seize control of Hammersley and force them to hand over the drugs that the girlfriend has hidden among Bomber's property. Nikki continues her investigation into ET's death and comes face to face with Campbell Fulton, who threatens her life if she doesn't stop her snooping. Guest actors: Steve Bisley (as CMDR Steve Marshall), Tasma Walton (as Jila), Blair McDonough (as Matt Robsenn), Jessica Napier (as Simone Robsenn), Andrew Buchanan (as Campbell Fulton).
38	12	"Black Gold"	Steve Mann	Jeff Truman	27 July 2009	1.279
A rescue at sea casts doubt on the circumstances of ET's death when a missing kayaker claims ET was working with pirates. But Nikki and the rest of the crew refuse to believe the rescued woman, assuming her story is borne from confusion caused by exposure. Determined to prove her story is real, and angered no-one will take her seriously the woman slips away from Hammersley in the middle of the night. Forced to go after her, and based on a best guess, they find her camp on nearby Penfold Island, and come across the proof that her story may hold credit – a photograph of ET taken the day before he died. Nikki is now frantic to find the woman convinced that she will have the answers to ET's death, but instead the search of the Island takes an unexpected turn when Buffer stumbles across an illegal oil smuggling operation and finds himself neck-deep in crude oil. Can his crew mates get to him in time, and even if they find him, can they get him out? Hammersley finally track down the missing kayaker, but this time, she has not survived her ordeal, and Nikki is no closer to finding the truth. Charge's weight threatens to sink his navy career. Will he become the biggest loser?
39	13	"Red Reef"	Ian Barry	John Ridley	27 July 2009	1.289
The crew of Hammersley set a sting for the oil thieves, but they manage to slip the net and get away. The trail has led them to meet up again with Campbell Fulton, but this time, he is determined to escape almost killing the XO and Spider in the process. When they finally catch up with him again, it is now Fulton who needs help as his employers, worried that he will talk, have tried to have him killed and used the same MO they used on ET. Secured on Hammersley, Nikki manages to finally make Fulton tell her the truth about ET, the oil smuggling, and who is behind it all. With good information, the crew goes ashore to a local prawn farm which has been converted into a pumping station for the oil, where they find Simone Robsenn and Matt Robsenn running the whole operation, and they don't care who gets hurt so long as they get rich. Forced to move before the police can arrive, the crew find themselves in a stand-off with the Robsenns which ends in tragedy for one of them.

== See also ==
- List of Sea Patrol episodes
