= Sea Patrol season 4 =

Sea Patrol
- Season 4
- Sea Patrol 4 Main Cast
- No. of episodes: 16

Release
- Original network: Nine Network
- Original release: 15 April – 29 July 2010

Season chronology
- ← Previous; Season 3 Next → Season 5

The fourth season of the Australian drama Sea Patrol began airing as Sea Patrol 4: The Right Stuff on 15 April 2010. Most regular cast members have returned. The season began with a major reshuffle of senior crew members, including a new Commander Maxine 'Knocker' White (Tammy McIntosh) replacing Commander Marshall (Steve Bisley), Mike Flynn being promoted to Commander, Steve Coburn (Steve Bastoni) becoming the new Lieutenant Commander, and the departure of the Navigation Officer (Nav). Other non returning cast members included Jeremy Lindsay Taylor (Buffer), whose position has been filled by Conrad Coleby (Dutchy) and Jay Ryan (Spider), replaced by Danielle Horvat (Bird). Filming began in September 2009 and the number of episodes has been extended from the usual 13 to 16.

== Casting ==
=== Main cast ===
Actor/actress	Character	Rank	Position
Ian Stenlake	Mike "CO" Flynn RAN	Commander	Commanding officer
Lisa McCune	Kate "XO" McGregor RAN	Lieutenant	Executive officer
John Batchelor	Andy "Charge" Thorpe	Chief Petty Officer	Chief Engineer
Matthew Holmes	Chris "Swain" Blake	Petty Officer	Coxswain/Chief Medic
Conrad Coleby	Dylan "Dutchy" Mulholland	Petty Officer	Boatswain
Kristian Schmid	Robert "RO" Dixon	Leading Seaman	Radio Operator
Nikolai Nikolaeff	Leo "2Dads" Kosov-Meyer	Leading Seaman	Electronics Technician
Kirsty Lee Allan	Rebecca "Bomber" Brown	Able Seaman	Chef/Assistant Medic
Danielle Horvat	Jessica "Gap Girl" Bird	Seaman	Boatswain's Mate

=== Recurring cast ===
Actor/actress	Character
Tammy MacIntosh	Commander Maxine "Knocker" White

== Episodes ==
No. overall	No. in season	Title	Directed by	Written by	Original release date	AUS viewers (millions)
40	1	"Night of the Long Knives"	Steve Mann	John Ridley	15 April 2010	1.30
The crew of HMAS Hammersley race to save the life of an American citizen when they receive her frantic mayday, but when they reach her boat they find no-one on board and a bomb hidden below decks. Escaping onto the RHIB they barely get clear when the bomb explodes and the resulting shock wave sends them crashing into the water. Mike's heartfelt promise to rescue the woman is questioned by NavCom who ask think he has been at sea too long, and it is time he takes the promotion he is due and moves to a shore-posting. Joined by their new buffer, Dylan "Dutchy" Mullholland (Conrad Coleby), the Hammersley crew resume their search for the missing woman, but when they find her she has been interrogated for information on the United States Ambassador, who is on a vacation at a classified location. Hammersley reach the Island holiday spot in time to intercept the terrorists before they can crash their boat loaded with explosives into the Island. Invited to a party by the ambassador to say thank you, Mike tackles a remaining assassin and saves the American ambassador. Mike is promoted to Commander and takes a shore posting. He invites Kate out for a drink to celebrate, and they restart their relationship.
41	2	"Crocodile Tears"	Geoff Bennett	Marcia Gardner	22 April 2010	1.10
Hammersley sets sail with new CO, Coburn, in command. During a night of R & R, 2Dads gets into a bar brawl over the capture of crocodiles taken from Australian waters illegally, and then has to decide whether to reveal that the CO was involved or get discharged from the Navy. No-one believes 2Dads when he mentions the CO's involvement and he is quickly losing support from his crew-mates. However, when a twist of fate bring the crocodile hunters face to face with the CO, they reveal his involvement in the fight and 2Dads's reputation is redeemed. For his lies, and complicity in almost getting 2Dads kicked out of the Navy the Commander steps down in disgrace. Mike tries to settle into his new position, and, during a heated argument over impartiality versus loyalty to the crew, Kate and Mike spend the night together. After the fallout of the crocodile incident, Mike is re-appointed CO of Hammersley, interrupting his relationship with Kate.
42	3	"The Right Stuff"	Steve Mann	Philip Dalkin	29 April 2010	1.04
During a routine patrol in the Arafura Sea, the crew of HMAS Hammersley encounter hostiles attempting to ship stolen uranium out of Australia. A representative of the shipping company comes aboard to assist in the investigation. Dutchy and 2Dads are tasked with guarding the shipment, but discover the transport is only carrying ordinary building bricks. The real shipment is on another ship, which the crew tracks down. Mike's godson Ryan, working at the docks, gets caught up in the encounter and taken hostage. Ryan and the uranium transport are rescued after a helicopter insertion and shootout. The company representative, involved in the scheme, attempts to assist the hijackers, but is thwarted by Mike who was suspicious.
43	4	"Ransom"	Geoff Bennett	Jeff Truman	6 May 2010	1.07
While relaxing at a tropical island resort, a young girl is kidnapped, prompting the crew of HMAS Hammersley to cut their break short in pursuit of the suspects. Kate's concern for the girl and determination to lead the operation to save her clash with Mike's personal fears for Kate's safety. The investigation leads to the girl's biological father, but when Dutchy is overly aggressive the operation to rescue the girl suffers a major set back. Charge proposes his own theory regarding Dutchy's odd behavior towards Kate, leading the XO to have an awkward, and misguided, talk with Dutchy about fraternization regulations. The ransom drop goes awry, and Kate gets taken hostage as well where she discovers that the kidnapping was organized by the girl's stepfather, who is killed by a co-conspirator. Kate and the girl are rescued by the Hammersley crew.
44	5	"Paradise Lost"	Steve Mann	Philip Dalkin	13 May 2010	1.13
On patrol in the Indian Ocean, HMAS Hammersley is disabled by a mess of long-line fishing nets that tangle the props. The unfouling of the screws is complicated by the discovery of a body tangled in the net. During repairs, the crew take a break on a nearby seemingly deserted island, where they encounter a small carbon neutral community, and Bomber strikes up a relationship with one of the residents. Evidence linking the body in the net to the island leads to the discovery of a drug operation being run by the community leader but when they investigate they discover the secret runs much deeper. RO's social awkwardness gets him in trouble when he mistakes Bomber's friendship for affection and reports to the CO that they are in a relationship. Bomber is furious when she finds out and starts to question whether she really wants to stay in the Navy. But when her life is in danger from the smugglers on the island, RO ignores her demands that he stays away from her and saves her life, making her realise that having her crew mates around is actually a good thing.
45	6	"Big Fish"	Steve Mann	John Ridley	20 May 2010	1.22
While fishing in the Torres Strait, Charge's attempts to catch a big fish are foiled by a small Cessna plane flying haphazardly. Charge looks into the origins of the plane, planning to get revenge somehow, but is dissuaded by the CO, who surmises the plane was just thrill seekers. The Hammersley comes across wreckage from the plane and rescues a single survivor wearing a prison overalls. Bomber struggles with her duty of care in providing pain relief and other medical assistance to a convicted rapist and murderer. Forced to stop at Tiparu Island for additional medical supplies, the crew comes across the escaped convicts who high-jacked the plane and a man claiming to be the pilot. Charge breaks protocol and endangers Bird by allowing her to accompany them to the island. A mix-up in the identity of the plane crash survivor threatens Bomber's life when they realise the pilot is in fact the escaped convict, but Charge shows compassion to another of the convicts who helps him to intervene just in time.
46	7	"Shoes of the Fisherman"	Geoff Bennett	Marcia Gardner	27 May 2010	1.17
During a routine patrol in the Arafura Sea, the Hammersley comes across an old foe of theirs, Hannibal. On boarding, RO comes into contact with Hannibal's rabid dog and is bitten. Anxiety over the dog attack and possible rabies infection, exacerbated by the crew's teasing over hypochondria, prompt him to seek sleeping pills from Swain. But an overdose on the pills causes RO to sleepwalk overboard unnoticed in the middle of the night. In the morning, 2Dads find a letter from RO to Bomber apologising for the confusion over the perceived relationship, and believes it to be a possible suicide note. Much to the relief of the RO a fishing boat comes to his rescue early in the morning, but he is less than pleased to discover he has been recovered by Hannibal and becomes an unwilling member of the fishing crew. Relief comes when a Navy patrol boat boards the FFV, but they mistake RO for one of the fisherman and treat him accordingly. RO manages to convince them of his real identity and is returned to his crew mates on Hammersley who are very relieved to see him and very apologetic about teasing him. The ordeal has given RO a new respect for the fisherman and what they have to go through to get by.
47	8	"The Universal Donor"	Geoff Bennett	Jeff Truman	3 June 2010	1.19
A comical scene ensues as the crew of the Hammersley are brushing up their first aid skills and Swain asks 2Dads to demonstrate CPR on Charge. But the mood changes when they encounter an unknown object in the water, and on bringing on-board discover that it is a freezer full of human organs, most likely destined for the black market. Back at base, Maxine informs Mike and Kate that there is still no new CO for the Hammersley, but she does have information on the organ trafficking. An American businessman Wassel Berkelman is believed to be behind it, and Maxine tasks Mike with tracking him down and stopping the trade. During their attempt to find the American ship, Hammersley encounters a ship full of refugees. The captain claims that they are heading to Indonesia, while the passengers think they are heading for Australia. The truth of their journey becomes clear when the boarding party find records of the passengers blood types and Rohypnol. Swain loses his temper when he realises the captains complicity in the barbaric trade. With emotions running high, and in an effort to keep Swain away from the search for Berkelman, he and Bird are asked to sail the refugee ship back to port, while Hammersley sets off hoping to catch Berkelman unawares. Not long after Hammersley's departure they are intercepted by another boat, initially asking for help, but which turns out to be carrying Berkelman and the organ traffickers who are looking for their refugees and have followed a homing beacon straight to the boat. When the doctor working with the traffickers is attacked, Swain reveals he is a medic and tries to save his life. But the Doctor dies, so Berkelman informs Swain he will have to take over the job of harvesting the organs as the only person left on board with medical training. With Bird's life at risk, Swain has little choice but to comply. The organ donor has been shot, however, and the kidneys are damaged. Berkelman is desperate for a replacement donor to meet the needs of his client, a Yakuza boss in Japan in need of a kidney. To Swain's horror Bird is a blood match. Held at gun point and with time running out, will he be forced to operate on Bird?
48	9	"Dutch Courage"	Steve Mann	John Ridley	10 June 2010	1.18
The Hammersley is on a routine FFV inspection in the Torres Strait when they discover grog runners. During boarding, Kate's life is threatened and under pressure Dutchy fails to do his job, suffering flash-backs to a similar situation where his previous XO had been killed, and letting the grog runners go with Kate as hostage together with the boarding parties guns and radios. Kate is shoved overboard shortly after by another of the armed men who turns out to be an undercover cop, and is picked up by the Hammersley unharmed. Called to account for their actions and for losing the guns and radios RO confronts Dutchy, telling him the stuff up was his fault. Hammersley docks at Port Johnson, an alcohol-free town. Dutchy feels the need to prove himself to the crew and investigates the grog runners alone at night. Meanwhile, 2Dads tries to prove to RO that Dutchy's medal for Gallantry is real and steals it without thinking, almost losing it. Without back-up Dutchy gets into trouble and takes a beating for his efforts, further angering the CO about his cowboy attitude. Later Kate confronts Dutchy about his behaviour, but the conversation is interrupted by sighting of the grog runners' truck. Giving pursuit, Dutchy and Kate are taken hostage by the grog runners. The two escape their confines but find themselves adrift miles from land and with no hope or rescue. Hoping he can swim for land Dutchy sets off, but a boat soon arrives carrying the local policeman, and Kate is thankful of the rescue until it is revealed that he is the ringleader of the grog syndicate, and the most dangerous member of all.
49	10	"Rawhide"	Geoff Bennett	Marcia Gardner	17 June 2010	1.10
En route to Karumba to provide flood relief, Hammersley receives a mayday from a vessel that was rammed by a cattle barge. The passengers are recovered, though RO's failure to disclose that he has recently had surgery endangers the survivors and recovery team. The barge turns out to have been hijacked by cattle thieves. The crew intervenes in a second hijacking and captures the rustlers. Bird encounters her drug addicted ex-boyfriend Darryl who she joined the Navy to escape after he became possessive, and becomes paranoid to the point she attacks 2Dads in a case of mistaken identity. She later learns that he is involved with the cattle rustlers, after he attacks and impersonates RO to gain access to the ship. RO, struggling with social isolation and learning to be a team player, pulls through and apprehends the stalker ex-boyfriend. Meanwhile, Kate tells Mike she needs to make decisions about her direction in life.
50	11	"Brotherhood of the Sea"	Steve Mann	Jeff Truman	24 June 2010	1.19
2Dads gets left behind on a reef dive by a charter boat, prompting an urgent search, but when the severed leg of his dive buddy is recovered the assumption is that they have both been killed by a shark attack. Charge, who faked a cold to avoid going on the dive, has doubts about the theory – Shark Attacks are extremely rare in the area and the damage to the leg doesn't match with bite marks. His guilt and conspiracy theories begin to wear on the rest of the crew. However, his persistence pays off, leading to the discovery of drug money on a North Korean freighter. 2Dads is finally located on a cay far away from the search zone given by the charter company, and is able to explain that the charter boat was making the drug pickup, and he managed to steal the stash and escape underwater, but his dive buddy wasn't so lucky and they killed her. The drug runners are apprehended after a shootout on the freighter.
51	12	"Rumble in the Jungle"	Geoff Bennett	Philip Dalkin	1 July 2010	1.12
The Hammersley is transporting medical supplies and a doctor, Sarah Denton (Sara Gleeson), to a clinic on Vatinaie Island. At the village, kids are playing with a live grenade, which explodes, injuring the chief’s son, Tiken (Joel Lok), and sparking tensions between the locals. Swain and Dutchy remain behind to assist with treating the boy as Hammersley heads off to continue the aid drop to Kaiten Island. During the delivery Bird slips in some water and soon begins to get sick, vomiting and showing signs of paralysis. Bomber does her best to treat Bird but she is getting worse, and her only possible hope is a dash to HMAS Newcastle and their medical bay, but they are more than 10 hours away. En-route 2Dads realizes Bird’s canteen is still full and that she must have refilled it on the island, suggesting contaminated water. But the water tests do not reveal much and her condition has become critical. Back on Vatinaie, the chief, Suil (Ariu Lang Sio), has been shot in a conflict with some of the younger villagers who are trying to gain control. He comes into the clinic for help, pursued by his attackers. Swain and Dutchy fend off the aggressors, but inadvertently make the matter worse by taking sides in the local conflict. Swain, Dutchy and the doctor, Sarah, with help from Suil and some of his family, decide to set off with the injured boy towards the other side of the island, hoping to outrun the young men. In the jungle, tensions are raised when they come across another group of heavily armed men. Luckily they turn out to be old friends of Suil. The chief leaves with them, hoping to draw the hostiles after him. Dutchy, still dazed from being hit over the head by one of the chief's recent friends, and Swain decide they need to set up camp overnight and set out again in daylight. On watch, Swain hears the young men from the village passing close by and the tension of the situation leads to a romantic moment with Sarah. Meanwhile, 2Dads has remembered that Bird stumbled in a creek and had indicated pain in her knee. The medical officer on Newcastle identifies her injury as a cone snail bite and is able to treat her successfully. At first light, it appears that they have escaped and are clear to continue, but the hostiles are lying in wait for them, and Sarah is shot as they are trying to escape. Dutchy manages to make contact with Hammersley, urging them to meet them on the beach, but they are still 10 minutes away. Unfortunately they arrive too late, and Sarah dies. Swain is shaken by his feelings for Sarah and from her death and the resulting violence on what used to be peaceful settlement.
52	13	"Soft Target (Soft Touch)"	Marcia Gardner	Steve Mann	8 July 2010	1.04
An old friend of 2Dads', Fraser (Clayton Watson), is posted on Hammersley as RO's assistant. The crew responds to a mayday from a motor cruiser, which has been attacked by a pirate speedboat. Soon after, Hammersley responds to another mayday, but this time find nothing amiss after Fraser surreptitiously switches the coordinates, and in the process blames the XO for the mix-up. 2Dads, overhearing Fraser on the phone, realizes his friend is assisting the pirates by passing on the coordinates of boats they encounter which are worth hitting. A married couple, the Langs, is attacked by pirates while diving, and the husband drowns. 2Dads confronts Fraser, who admits to working with the pirates but denies involvement in the diver's death. 2Dads threatens to go to the captain, but Fraser brings up 2Dad's dodgy past and current financial difficulties making it clear that no one would believe him. Meanwhile, Swain and XO find discrepancies in the story of Eliza Lang (Alex Ashton), the diver's wife, and suspect she may have orchestrated the drowning to obtain her husband's life insurance. Eliza, realizing the crew is on to her scheme, manages to get back aboard her yacht and slip away. Hammersley locates the yacht, but this time finds Eliza drowned. Fraser has managed to convince 2Dads that he had nothing to do with the attack on the Langs, and is now confident that 2Dads will keep quiet, offering to cut him in on some of the profits from the scam. Meanwhile, the XO is briefing the team on the boarding of an FFV, and Fraser and 2Dads are to be part of the boarding party. The operation turns out to be a sting to catch the pirates and Fraser, whom 2Dads had reported to the CO the previous day. Charge finds romance online, but it turns out to be another scam by Fraser.
53	14	"Live Catch"	Geoff Bennett	Jeff Truman	15 July 2010	1.16
While boarding a Foreign Fishing Vessel (FFV), Bomber is groped by a fisherman and responds with pepper spray, accidentally hitting RO. Kate tells Bomber that her attitude threatens her chance to be promoted to Leading Seaman. 2Dads convinces Bomber to volunteer for the steaming party for a second FFV so she can demonstrate leadership, and XO places her in command. However, hijinks between 2Dads and Bomber result in the XO getting splashed in the face, leading to an immediate reaction to the water and trouble breathing. The medical emergency and resulting chaos allows the fishing crew to retake control of their boat, putting the XO's life at greater risk. Boarding yet another FFV, Dutchy and Charge discover that the fishermen are using cyanide. Based on the report Bomber was able to send before losing control of the boat, they realize that this is what the XO was exposed to. At the mothership, the XO is treated by the captain with a drug which appears to help, but also makes her high. The fisherman who groped Bomber is also on the mothership. He drags the XO to his cabin. Still suffering from the effect of the drug, she is powerless to fight him off, but Bomber is able to get to her in time, assisted by the FFV's captain who is disgusted by the behaviour of his man. In retaliation, the fisherman leads a mutiny. Amid the ensuing gun fight and the general confusion, Bomber is able to transmit their position to Hammersley. Whilst Bomber is in the wheelhouse, 2Dads is exposed to the cyanide. The Hammersley crew uses an FFV as a trojan horse and are able to board the mothership, rescuing the steaming party. Kate tells Bomber that her quick thinking and level-headedness lead to their rescue and she is recommending her for promotion.
54	15	"Flotsam and Jetsam"	Steve Mann	Philip Dalkin	22 July 2010	1.042
Caught in a storm, Hammersley responds to an EPIRB signal, rescuing Lara Strauss (Lauren Dillon) from debris. After transferring Lara to the Newcastle, Hammersley continues the search. They come across a salvager, Albie Dumas (Andy Anderson), arguing with Karl (Steve Le Marquand), the brother of Martin Strauss over the right to dive the wreck for salvage, but manage to defuse the situation. On shore, Kate meets Lara, who warns the XO that the salvager is in danger. Before she can give any more information, they are attacked by Karl and his friends. Dutchy, disobeying a "suggestion" from the XO to stay away, intervenes and drives the attackers away, but they grab Lara and take her with them. Hammersley catches up with Albie's boat, but he and his crew are found murdered. 2Dads calls in on Bomber while on shore leave, violating the Navy intraship fraternization regulations. While the ship is in port to fix the malfunctioning radio, Dutchy dives on the yacht wreck, but doesn't return. The Hammersley investigates and finds Dutchy in the water, injured. Bringing him on board, a gold bar is found in his wetsuit. The bar is identified as part of a shipment hijacked a month before. Dutchy's photos of the wreck reveal a missing inflatable boat. Estimating the course of the boat, Hammersley searches an island and finds one of the thieves holding Lara hostage. She explains that her husband was unsatisfied with his share of the gold and fled with the whole take. XO and Bomber escort Lara and one of the thieves back to the RHIB. Further up the beach, 2Dads and Swain spot Lara's husband Martin (Tim McDonald) and chase after him. 2Dads manages to catch him and in doing so finds the stash of stolen gold Martin has been hiding. Unbeknownst to 2Dads, Swain has been intercepted by Karl and the rest of the gang during the pursuit. When 2Dads returns to the beach with Martin they are met at gunpoint by Karl's men, who force them to load the gold onto their boat. Realising something is wrong when they can't reach Swain by radio, reinforcements arrive from Hammersley, including Dutchy. They manage to surround Karl and force him to surrender, rescuing 2Dads and Swain. Dutchy's injury has not fully healed, however, and he collapses. Back on Hammersley, high on pethidine Dutchy has a very lovely moment with the XO. Swain walks in on 2Dads and Bomber making out. Bomber decides to be the one transferred and changes her mind about renewing her contract.
55	16	"In Too Deep"	Geoff Bennett	John Ridley	29 July 2010	1.085
While docked at Orlan Island, Mike leaps to the rescue of the baby son of a grateful Anton Gorski (Valentino Del Toro), who had fallen off the wharf in a carriage. Later, Maxine gives Mike a list of candidate COs to replace him, but he rejects them as unsuitable so she asks him to make his own list, and he adds Kate's name to the top. Hammersley receives a pan-pan call from Stuart Mason (Jason Hayes), captain of an oceanographic vessel, who had spotted a body being dumped from a fishing boat. After retrieving the body, identified as a drug smuggler, the crew boards a nearby fishing vessel matching the description given by Mason, but find nothing. Back on Hammersley, the CO asks Kate to retrieve something from his cabin. She inadvertently sees the list of possible CO candidates and misunderstanding Mike's earlier comment about those on it, thinks he believes her unfit for command. She decides to transfer off the ship. Back on shore, Mike runs into Mason in a bar and they get to talk. After helping him back to his ship, Mike is mistaken for Mason by a drug smuggler, Cavenaugh, who is looking to hire the oceanographic vessel to search for a minisub. Mike manages to leave a message for Kate, however while Mike is making the call, Cavenaugh finds the real Captain Mason and takes Mike captive. Upon locating the mini-sub, Cavenaugh's team recover their drugs and rendezvous with their boss. Deciding Mike has served his purpose, they decide to force him into the sub. In the process Mike recognizes the boss as Anton Gorski. Managing to track down the oceanographic vessel, Hammersley's crew board and find Gorski's wife, Sylvanna, (Alin Sumarwata) tied up. She tells them that Anton is taking the sub, with Mike inside, to deep water to sink it. As the RHIB arrives at the sub it explodes, and to the crews horror and disbelief they can only assume that Mike is dead, forcing Kate to become acting CO. Maxine reassures Kate she is fit to take command of the Hammersley, explaining that Mike has strongly recommended her for the role, and Kate realises she misunderstood the list she had seen previously in his cabin. Gorski's ship is located. Ignoring protocol, a distraught Kate leads the boarding party and confronts Anton at gun point about the murder of Mike Flynn, Anton says nothing and Swain manages to talk Kate down from shooting Anton. Desperate with grief, Kate collapses in the cabin where she hears noises from an adjoining room. On investigate she finds Mike, gagged and beaten, but still alive. Anton had spared him in gratitude for saving his baby.

== See also ==
- List of Sea Patrol episodes
