= Sea Patrol season 5 =

Sea Patrol
- Season 5
- No. of episodes: 13

Release
- Original network: Nine Network
- Original release: 26 April – 12 July 2011

Season chronology
- ← Previous; Season 4

The fifth and final series of the Australian drama Sea Patrol began airing as Sea Patrol 5: Damage Control on 26 April 2011. The Nine Network has confirmed that series 5, which comprised comprise thirteen episodes each with a stand-alone story, would be the last series of Sea Patrol, due to a reliance of government rebates which expired after 68 episodes.

== Casting ==
=== Main Cast ===
Actor/Actress	Character	Rank	Position
Ian Stenlake	Mike "CO" Flynn RAN	Commander	Commanding officer
Lisa McCune	Kate "XO" McGregor RAN	Lieutenant	Executive Officer
Dominic Deutscher	Ryan White	Midshipman	Officer
John Batchelor	Andy "Charge" Thorpe	Chief Petty Officer	Chief Engineer
Matthew Holmes	Chris "Swain" Blake	Petty Officer	Coxswain/Chief Medic
Conrad Coleby	Dylan "Dutchy" Mulholland	Petty Officer	Boatswain
Kristian Schmid	Robert "RO" Dixon	Leading Seaman	Radio Operator
Nikolai Nikolaeff	Leo "2Dads" Kosov-Meyer	Leading Seaman	Electronics Technician
Danielle Horvat	Jessica "Gap Girl" Bird	Seaman	Chef/Assistant Medic

=== Recurring cast ===
Actor/actress	Character
Tammy MacIntosh	Commander Maxine "Knocker" White
Ditch Davey	Captain Jim Roth
Renai Caruso	Madelaine Cruise

== Episodes ==
No. overall	No. in season	Title	Directed by	Written by	Original release date	AUS viewers (millions)
56	1	"The Third Man"	Steve Mann	John Ridley	26 April 2011	0.941
While out in a town celebrating Kates upcoming promotion, the bar they are in is destroyed by a bomb. 2Dads is thought to be lost as he was close to the blast zone but is found and confirms it was caused by a suicide bomber. In response to this attack, SAS Commander Jim Roth returns to debrief the crew along with Madeleine Cruise, who is immediately dismissive of Dutchy and wants him far away from her. RO later confirms that Madeleine is a 'spook', a government agent with an agenda and she drafts the crew to help her find out if the bombing was an isolated incident or the start of a massive terrorist attack.
57	2	"Eye for an Eye"	Geoff Bennett	Marcia Gardner	3 May 2011	0.675
During a boarding to arrest 2 bank robbers, Dutchy is shot by a masked female accomplice and Kate kills her in self defense. The woman is later revealed to be Isabelle McGinley the younger sister of Heath McGinley, one of the robbers who managed to escape police custody with his partner. Kate then finds herself being terrorized by McGinley, who is trying to kill her to avenge his sister, first attacking her at NAVCOM and then when Dutchy went to her home to get some clothes, McGinley was already inside. Meanwhile, Ryan White has just graduated from Naval College and invited Bird to a graduation party. While there, they and 2Dads are approached by a young man named Corey, who challenges them to a speedboat race, which ends in 2Dads being arrested while Corey escaped. Later that night, 2Dads is drugged and has his uniform and ID stolen, which is used by a mystery man to access the Navy Base and attack Kate, though he escapes from Dutchy and Mike. While being chewed out, 2Dads identifies the attacker as Corey, who they realize was targeting a member of the Hammersley crew to get to Kate. Worse, Bird has disappeared, and Corey is soon identified as Corey McGinley, brother of Heath and Isabelle. Now the crew must muster all hands to stop 2 revenge-driven murderers and rescue Bird.
58	3	"Crimes of Passion"	Steve Mann	Jeff Truman	10 May 2011	0.603
59	4	"Spoils of War"	Geoff Bennett	Philip Dalkin	17 May 2011	0.718
60	5	"Dead Zone"	Steve Mann	Catherine Ferla	24 May 2011	0.658
61	6	"The Stinger"	Geoff Bennett	Marcia Gardner	31 May 2011	0.645
The crew go undercover to stop a gang network.
62	7	"Black Flights"	Steve Mann	Jeff Truman	31 May 2011	0.389
Charge has a health problem. Charge and 2Dads find out about UFO which leads them to a drug gang. Mike suspects a local police officer as a drug criminal. Ryan and Bird befriend a person who has a dangerous secret.
63	8	"Lifeline"	Geoff Bennett	Philip Dalkin	7 June 2011	0.713
2Dads is trapped in a small submarine with oxygen running out fast.
64	9	"Dead Sea"	Steve Mann	John Ridley	14 June 2011	0.493
The crew are sent to investigate a terrorist network which later results in a murder on board the warship.
65	10	"The Hunted"	Geoff Bennett	John Ridley	21 June 2011	0.532
The crew are captured by armed men but later escape.
66	11	"The Morning After"	Steve Mann	Philip Dalkin	28 June 2011	0.752
Charge made love to a woman who wanted to go to Australia. Her father captures her and Charge.
67	12	"Saving Ryan"	Geoff Bennett	Jeff Truman	5 July 2011	0.820
The Hammersley crew boards an FFV, and finds four people murdered and a few terrified survivors, one of whom screams that they were attacked by the Australian navy. Kate starts throwing up for no apparent reason. Back at NAVCOM, Maxine White tells Mike and Kate that the evidence indicates that the FFV was attacked by the "Sassy," a boat owned by GD Security, a mercenary group run by a former SAS agent, Garth Davidson. Hammersley is tasked with intercepting the Sassy and bringing Garth Davidson back to port. Maxine privately asks Mike for his help in finding her AWOL son, Ryan. Boarding Sassy, the Hammersley crew discovers a large number of weapons and a foreign diplomat, Mr Tagobe. But Davidson has all the necessary paperwork for the armaments. Kate throws up again, but says she is fine. Meanwhile, Bird finds Ryan hiding below decks. Ryan claims he is out of the navy and in training with GD Security. He begs the reluctant Bird to keep his presence a secret. The Feds clear Davidson of the attack on the FFV. Kate consults Swain about her nausea; he offers her nausea medication and a pregnancy test. Mike goes with Dutchy to GD Security’s training centre to get Ryan. Maxine calls to tell Mike that Stewart White, Ryan's father, has succumbed to cancer. Ryan is insolent and dismissive when informed of Stewart White’s death, his own AWOL status, and that his upcoming mission with GD Security could cost him his life. Hammersley is ordered to escort Sassy, with Minister Tagobe and the diamonds he is carrying, back to international waters, and return the weapons. Swain arrests Ryan, but Maxine tells Mike that Ryan is no longer navy. Later, there is another mayday call from Davidson on Sassy. He claims to be under attack by pirates. When Hammersley arrives, they find five bodies, including Tagobe, but neither Ryan nor Davidson. Mike informs Maxine that it looks like Ryan is dead. Mike is determined to find out what happened and decides to go on a "goodwill" visit to Moroko, where there is a thriving diamond trade. They discover a known diamond trader and Davidson, very much alive, on his way to meet him. Mike confronts Davidson about Ryan. Davidson repeats his pirate story and tells Mike Ryan is dead and that he (Davidson) was the only survivor. Collecting evidence against Davidson, Mike sees someone he thinks is Ryan and chases him. It is not Ryan, but a young man named Jesus, who leads Mike to his injured son. Back on Hammersley, Ryan explains what actually happened, laying the blame for the deaths squarely on Davidson. A very happy Maxine tells Mike that Davidson was desperate to disappear because a video showing him ordering the massacre of Iraqi civilians has appeared on the internet. Hammersley finds the new boat on which Davidson and Sahid had left Moroko. Sahid has killed himself. Davidson thinks he has won, but Mike is furious, and, when Davidson starts a fight, he finishes it. Back on Hammersley, Davidson, certain that he is the only survivor, sticks to his story until he is confronted by Ryan, proving he is lying. Maxine is waiting to take Ryan to the hospital and, while Mike acknowledges her from the ship, decides to visit later. Mike tells Kate that the whole ship has been saying she is pregnant. She tells him she is not but asks him “how would you feel if I were?”
68	13	"One Perfect Day"	Steve Mann	Marcia Gardner	12 July 2011	0.843
The Hammersley intercepts a vessel suspected of being used for human smuggling. The vessel is abandoned except for several very sick men and a Geiger counter. The sick men are determined to be dying of radiation poisoning and before dying one discloses that the boat had picked up two men carrying very heavy cases, which when covertly opened were found to contain metal rods later determined to be Cesium 137. Before being intercepted the vessel rendezvous with another boat and the two men transfer with the cases. The Hammersley is dispatched to search for the boat with the cases. Prior to departure Jim Roth and Madelaine Cruise board; Jim takes Kate aside and proposes marriage. Kate says she’ll think about it. The Hammersley intercepts a fishing trawler which puts up heavy resistance; when boarded a quantity of Semtex is found leading to conclusion that terrorists are building “dirty” bombs for use on Australian soil. Using tracking data from the trawler’s GPS the Hammersley first travels to an island where another man is found dying of radiation poisoning, and then to a cruiser where a quantity of Cesium 137 if found. After a short, private interrogation of one of the prisoners Madelaine declares that all Cesium and Semtex has been seized and the threat is over. Dutchy becomes suspicious of Madelaine’s behavior; Mike communicates his concerns with NAVCOM who dispatches all ships, including the Hammersley to search all ships approaching Australian ports. The Hammersley intercepts a cruiser heading for Cairns harbor and a fully assembled dirty bomb is found. Madelaine is caught phoning an unknown party reporting the interception. Jim volunteers to try to disarm the bomb; Swain to pilot the cruiser to open water and the rest of the crew returns to the Hammersley. Jim and Swain manage to separate the Cesium from the bomb and throw it overboard; the Semtex explodes killing Jim and Swain. In a moment of truth before a posthumous award ceremony for Jim and Swain, Kate tells Mike she went shopping for a wedding dress but realized that there was only one man she could marry. Mike replies that there’s only one woman he could ever marry. During a closing photo sequence it’s shown that Charge became a mining engineer in West Australia, Dutchy deployed to Afghanistan, Bird became a full-fledged Navy Medic, 2Dads went AWOL in Singapore, RO remained with patrol boats, and Mike was promoted to captain assigned to NAVCOM. The final photo showing Kate says that Kate and Mike got married and are expecting their first child.

== See also ==
- List of Sea Patrol episodes
