= Sea Patrol (disambiguation) =

Sea Patrol may refer to:

- Sea Patrol, an Australian television series from 2007 to 2011
  - Sea Patrol (season 1)
  - Sea Patrol (season 2), known as Sea Patrol II: The Coup
  - Sea Patrol (season 3), known as Sea Patrol: Red Gold
  - Sea Patrol (season 4), known as Sea Patrol: The Right Stuff
  - Sea Patrol (season 5), known as Sea Patrol: Damage Control
- Sea Patrol UK, a 6-part British documentary drama television series about several agencies that patrol the English Channel
- Part of the name of various real past or present naval units, such as:
  - The Bering Sea Patrol
- North Sea Patrol, a poem by Rudyard Kipling
- North Sea Patrol, a 1939 film starring Geoffrey Toone
- A part of the Paw Patrol fictional scenario and toy range

== See also ==
- Coastguard
- Coastal defence and fortification
- Maritime security
