= Sea Patrol season 2 =

Sea Patrol
- Season 2
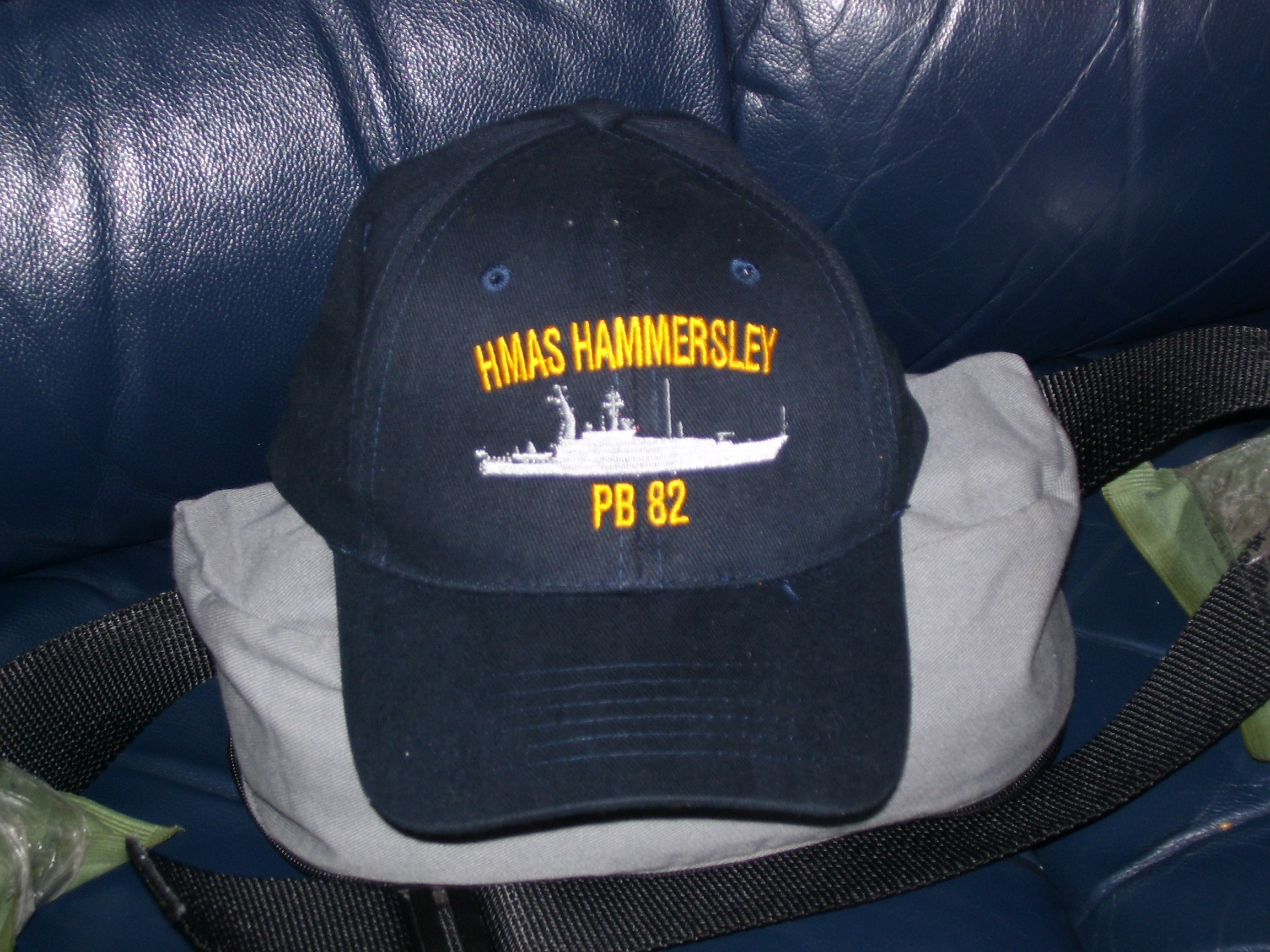
- Cap from the fictional Armidale-class HMAS Hammersley
- No. of episodes: 13

Release
- Original network: Nine Network
- Original release: 31 March – 23 June 2008

Season chronology
- ← Previous; Season 1 Next → Season 3

The second season of the Australian drama Sea Patrol premiered on the Nine Network on 31 March 2008 and aired on Monday nights at 8:30 PM. The thirteen-episode season ended on 23 June 2008.

The season introduced a new patrol boat, following the decommissioning of the original, Fremantle-class boat in the final scenes of season one. The new HMAS Hammersley (hull number 82) was of the Armidale class, reflecting the real-life changeover in the Australian fleet. The second season also featured the debut of a new main character, Able Seaman Rebecca "Bomber" Brown, as the boat's new cook.

Though advertised by the Nine Network as Sea Patrol II: The Coup, episodes themselves bore no title other than Sea Patrol, and the ISAN number indicated that the episodes were merely episodes 14–26 of Sea Patrol.

Continuing the format from the first season, episodes generally moved a season-long story arc along. As the Nine Network marketing indicated, this arc involved a coup on the Samaru Islands, a fictional island nation close to Australia. In many ways, the story was evocative of Operation ANODE, a peacekeeping mission to the Solomon Islands that has been called "the [operational] pinnacle for the Fremantle class" by the Australian Department of Defence.

== Casting ==
=== Main cast ===
Actor	Character	Rank	Position
Ian Stenlake	Mike "CO" Flynn RAN	Lieutenant-commander	Commanding officer
Lisa McCune	Kate "XO" McGregor RAN	Lieutenant	Executive officer
Saskia Burmeister	Nikki "Nav" Caetano	Lieutenant	Navigator
John Batchelor	Andy "Charge" Thorpe	Chief petty officer	Chief engineer
Matthew Holmes	Chris "Swain" Blake	Petty officer	Coxswain/Chief medic
Jeremy Lindsay Taylor	Pete "Buffer" Tomaszewski	Petty officer	Boatswain
Kristian Schmid	Robert "RO" Dixon	Leading seaman	Radio operator
David Lyons	Josh "ET" Holiday	Leading seaman	Electronics technician
Kirsty Lee Allan	Rebecca "Bomber" Brown	Able seaman	Chef/assistant medic
Jay Ryan	Billy "Spider" Webb	Seaman	Boatswain's mate

=== Recurring cast ===
Actor	Character
Steve Bisley	Commander Steven 'Steve' Marshall
Alan Dale	Ray Walsman
Ditch Davey	SAS Captain Jim Roth
Dajana Cahill	Carly Walsman
Geoff Morrell	Lieutenant-Commander Jack Freeman

== Main plot ==
The season-long story arc revolved around a political conflict in the fictional Samaru Islands, which was ultimately shown to be located approximately due east of Cairns. Starting somewhere during a political campaign to elect the nation's president, the season ended literally on the day of the election. Throughout the season, the crew of Hammersley encountered an increasing number of clues that someone was using the waters off northeast Queensland to stage a paramilitary coup of the sitting Samaran government. Ultimately, it became clear that someone meant to stop the impending election from proceeding according to the will of voters. Over the course of the season, Australian businessman, Ray Walsman – an apparent victim of the anti-government forces in the premiere episode – emerged as the leader of the insurgency. His aim was to secure lucrative mining rights from the government which would have been formed had the coup succeeded.

In the season opener, the writers allowed one of the characters to directly reference the real-life events that inspired the story line. Following an initial rescue mission to the Samaru Islands in "The Dogs of War", Hammersley's captain tells his department heads that the Australian government has finalised a peacekeeping arrangement with the Samaran government, and that return visits are therefore likely. Charge says, "Great. That'd be the Solomons all over again."

== Ongoing subplots ==
All main characters had at least one subplot which appeared in more than one episode. Among them were: Nav and ET's increasing problems in keeping their romantic relationship a secret, Bomber's anger-management issues, Spider's relationship with Carly Walsman, the negative impact of a naval career on Swain's marriage, the differing ways in which Buffer and Charge dealt with near-death experiences, Kate's relationship with SAS officer Jim Roth, Mike's struggle to choose the best way to advance his career, and ROs continued social isolation from his shipmates.

== Production ==
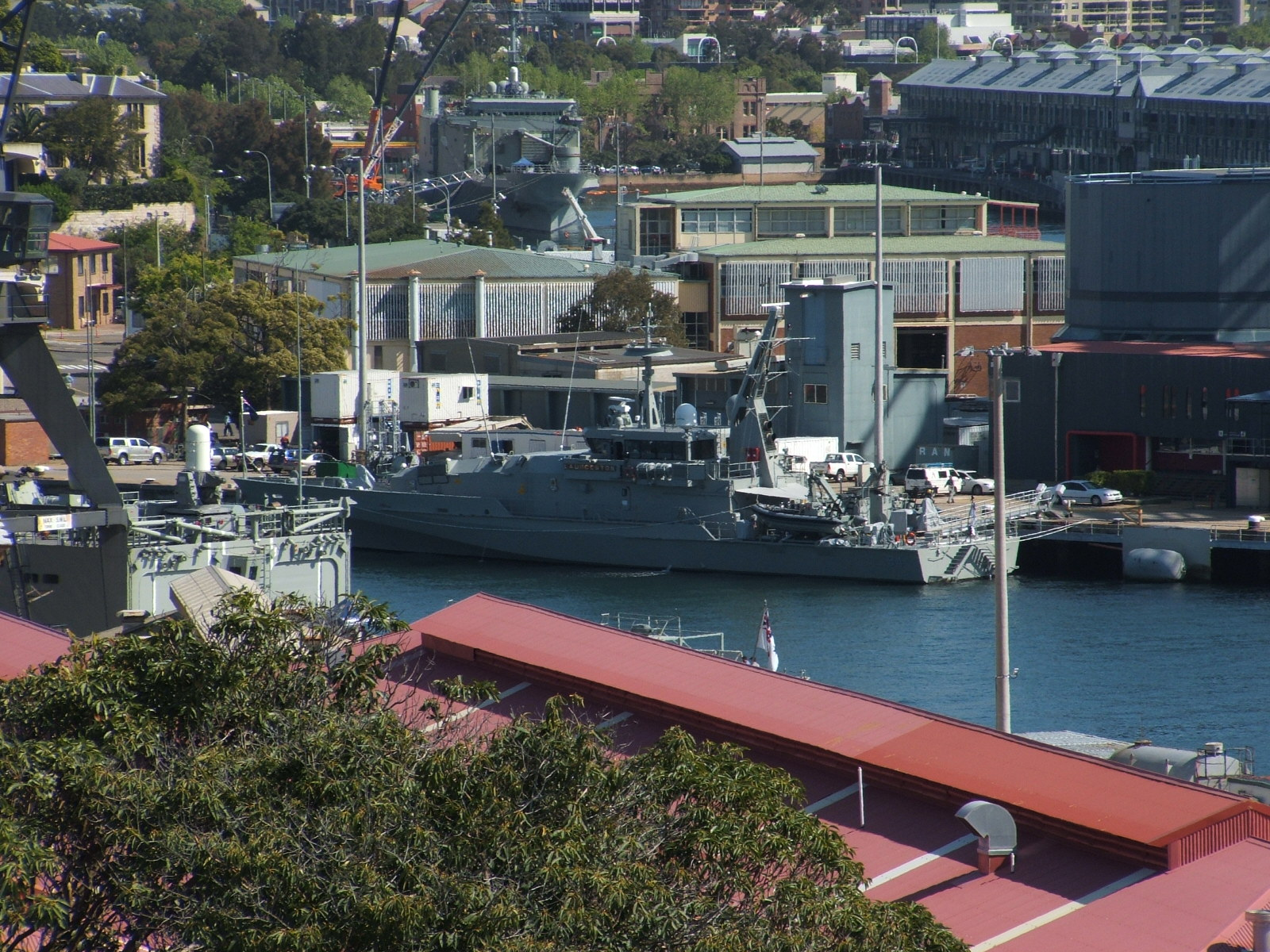
HMAS Launceston, one of the Armidale-class boats used for filming Sea Patrol

The season was filmed on the Royal Australian Navy's new Armidale-class patrol boat. 42 days of the filming schedule were spent aboard HMAS Broome, with pickup shooting later performed aboard HMAS Launceston. The remainder of the 86 days of filming were at studios, and on location at the Gold Coast, Queensland.

== Reception ==
=== Storylines controversies ===
The series caused controversy among some officers of the Royal Australian Navy when they came to believe that "its raunchy storylines" were "making a mockery of the navy". Controversy was caused when, in some episodes, there were hints of romance between RAN officers and seamen. These were said to make a mockery of the navy's strict non-fraterisation policy.

The amount of sex on the show is simply a bloody joke... It makes a mockery of the incredible lengths that the navy and Department of Defence have taken to ensure that interpersonal relationships are kept at a professional level... The reality is some of it is absolutely absurd

— Naval Association of Australia president, Les Dwyer,

Some controversy was also caused with the storylines of the second season of Sea Patrol which feature a political coup in the fictional islands of Samaru. While some critics embraced the new storylines of the show, some were worried that "It's a tricky business when TV dramas stray into real-world politics".

=== Critical response ===
Reviews of the season were mixed. One reviewer said that the show had learned from its mistakes of "simplicity and stiffness" during its freshman season to deliver a season whose "most striking aspect" was its "naturalness".

Another reviewer recommended the season to his readers as an overall improvement on the first, especially praising the dramatic possibilities inherent in the bigger Armidale-class bridge and the "more contemporary, plot-driven" story arc. But he still highlighted areas of possible improvement. Making the point that the show's dependence on the Australian Navy sometimes made it difficult for the show to indulge in interesting usage of dramatic license, he said that "McElroy All Media appears to have taken a "steady as she goes" approach to change rather than taking hold of the wheel and firmly jumping the shark with a tougher, grittier tone."

=== Ratings ===
Ratings for this season successfully reversed the trend of the first season. Whereas the first year had been plagued by a generally downward trend, season two was characterised by gradually improving ratings. Only the Brisbane region exhibited a strong fall-off of viewers in the season's final weeks. Although no episode of the season scored as highly as season one's first week, the final five weeks held steady at 1.5 million viewers nationally. The last two episodes of the season gained well over half a million more viewers over the last two installments of season one.

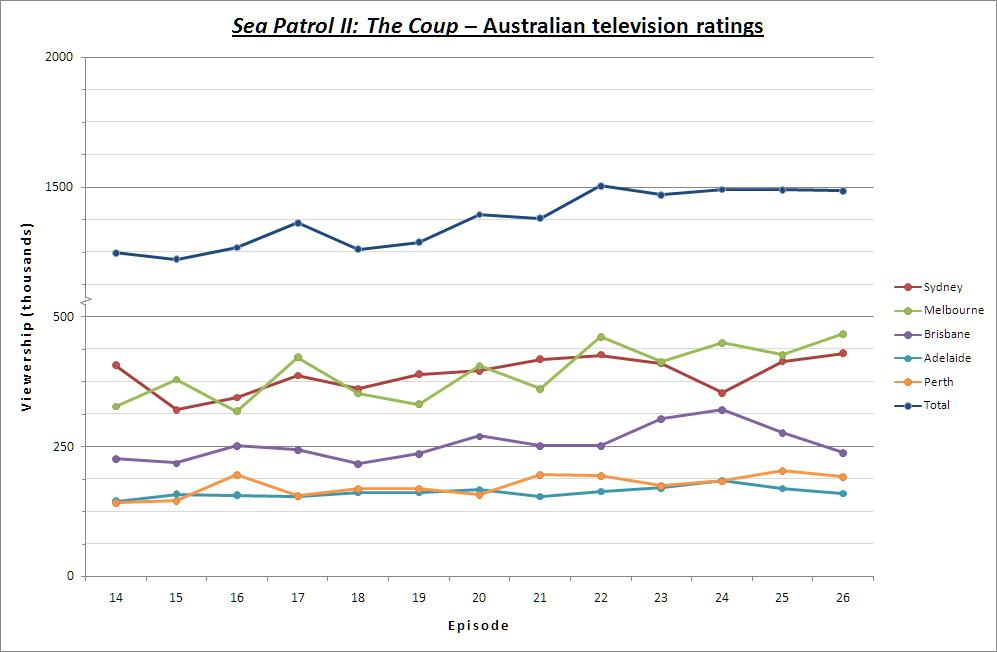

Episode number Production number	Title	Sydney	Melbourne	Brisbane	Adelaide	Perth	TOTAL	WEEKLY RANK	NIGHTLY RANK
14; 2-01	The Dogs of War	407,000	327,000	227,000	144,000	142,000	1,247,000	21	7
15; 2-02	Fortune Favours	321,000	379,000	218,000	158,000	146,000	1,222,000	26	12
16; 2-03	Takedown	345,000	318,000	252,000	156,000	196,000	1,267,000	20	7
17; 2-04	Heaven Born Captains	387,000	422,000	244,000	153,000	156,000	1,362,000	18	7
18; 2-05	Giving Up The Dead	361,000	352,000	217,000	162,000	169,000	1,260,000	26	9
19; 2-06	Birds	389,000	332,000	237,000	161,000	168,000	1,287,000	21	6
20; 2-07	Hidden Agendas	396,000	405,000	270,000	166,000	157,000	1,394,000	10	5
21; 2-08	Heart of Glass	418,000	361,000	252,000	153,000	196,000	1,380,000	12	6
22; 2-09	Shadow Line	427,000	461,000	252,000	163,000	194,000	1,505,000	6	4
23; 2–10	Rules of Engagement	411,000	413,000	304,000	170,000	174,000	1,471,000	10	5
24; 2–11	A Brilliant Career	354,000	449,000	321,000	184,000	183,000	1,491,000	8	4
25; 2–12	Friends Close, Enemies Closer	415,000	426,000	277,000	169,000	203,000	1,489,000	8	3
26; 2–13	Soldiers of Fortune	430,000	467,000	239,000	159,000	191,000	1,486,000	8	4

== Episodes ==
No. overall	No. in season	Title	Directed by	Written by	Original release date	AUS viewers (millions)
14	1	"The Dogs of War"	Geoff Bennett	Adam H. Todd	31 March 2008	1.247
Hammersley is sent to rescue aid workers during a coup in the Pacific nation of the Samaru Islands, but a recurring technical glitch causes Mike to demand NavCom for a Technical Operator on board the ship. After rescuing Ray Walsman and his associates they rendezvous with another ship to collect their new transfer, E.T. His return is welcomed by all except Nav, as they can't officially pursue a relationship on board the same ship, and is angry that he didn't refuse the transfer. The interception of a foreign fishing vessel turns into a life threatening pursuit when Charge is stabbed by one of the crew they are trying to help. He is flown to a hospital and news eventually travels that he will make a full recovery. Guest actors: Brad McMurray, Che Timmins, Jimmy Christiansen, Byron Hulbert, Russell Ingram, Rico Lescott, Troy Hunter, Malachi Waters.
15	2	"Fortune Favours"	Ian Barry	Michaeley O'Brien	7 April 2008	1.222
Bombers short temper questions her career after she tries to push Spider over the side of a ship during a training exercise after he taunts and mocks her, causing Buffer to consider having her transferred off the ship. Hammersley rescues 2 men who claim their boat was stolen. Tracking the course of the stolen boat, Hammersley encounters the island home of Ray Walsman and his daughter Carly. The crew eventually find the boat adrift with a dead man on board, and are unable to ascertain how he died. Meanwhile Charge is due to be awarded a medal for bravery after being stabbed, but is having trouble coming to terms with it secretly. Swain soon learns that Charge never went to see a shrink to deal with any post-incident trauma, and does his best to help Charge come to terms with the attack. Hammersley gets an emergency call from Ray Walsman: Carly has collapsed from an infection due to a heart condition and needs to be taken to hospital on the mainland, leaving Buffer, Bomber and Spider on board the boat with the body. As the ship heads for home, Swain realises Carly seems to be medically fine, and when confronted she admits she faked her condition to spend time with other people and a night on the mainland. When the 2 men rescued try to swim away from the ship, they soon admit they and the dead man are all smuggling eastern brown snakes, as Bomber, Spider and Buffer find their lives when the snakes get loose. With her knowledge of snakes, Bomber is able to save the three of them and Buffer tells her that as long as he sees more of the cool headed version of her, Bomber has still got a future in the Navy. Guest actors: Anthony Standish, Robert Griffiths.
16	3	"Takedown"	Geoff Bennett	Tony Morphett	14 April 2008	1.267
Nikki is still angry with E.T. that he returned aboard the ship when they are trying to build a relationship, despite his efforts to convince her he didn't have a choice in the matter without raising suspicion. Hammersley is diverted to intercept a SIEV (Suspected Illegal Entry Vessel) which has collided with coral and sunk. They recover the survivors but Kate and Nikki are in dire jeopardy when 3 of them turn the rescue into a hostage situation, and an innocent child in need of medical help fights for survival. E.T. struggles to keep his feelings for Nav in check as control of the ship is slowly taken away and they are ordered to sail for Papua New Guinea or risk deaths. Mike and the guys try to get the ships course headed for a rendezvous with an SAS team capable of retaking the ship but the hostage takers realise the deception and start a gunfight in the engine room. As time runs out, Mike orchestrates a daring raid which subdues both the hostage takers and the hostages long enough for control to be restored and the day to be saved. In the aftermath, Nikki seems to slowly forgive E.T. and is glad he is with her now. Guest actors: James Stewart, Anthony Edwards, Ray Tiernan, Michelle Ayala.
17	4	"Heaven Born Captains"	Ian Barry	Jeff Truman	21 April 2008	1.362
A charming SAS officer causes a stir. An illegal fishing boat is the subject of a perilous boarding. A promised promotion is put at risk by a foolish stunt, and an elegant soiree given by the French Consulate on Samaru is attended by both Cupid and the green-eyed monster. Guest actors: Joel Pierce, Mira Pawel, Richard Chong, Ariu Lang Sio, Vince Gorce, Anthony Guilbert, Haley Mitchell, Ben Siemer, Nik Schodel, Jamie Hite.
18	5	"Giving Up The Dead"	Geoff Bennett	John Ridley	28 April 2008	1.26
The RO's future in the Navy is in questions when an incident with the RHIB leads to the discovery that he has drugs in his system, and the crew start to question just how well they really know their radio operator. RO, feeling ostracized by his shipmates is starting to suffer flashbacks, and is convinced that his drinks must have been spiked during a night out with some Swedish backpackers. Later, the body of an apparently murdered young man is brought aboard Hammersley and RO recognises him as one of the backpackers, but worried he may in some way be involved in the death, he keeps the information to himself. Hammersley tries to find out what has happened to the man, and during the search encounters a stranded fisherman, and offer their assistance, the fisherman is reluctant to accept their help, but following an altercation in the galley between RO and ET, Mike Flynn insist the XO and RO provide an escorts to the nearest port, thereby presenting the ideal chance to get RO off the ship and for the XO to find out what is going on. RO soon becomes suspicious of the fisherman and as his memory comes back realises this is the man who killed the backpacker and tried to kill him. Now he needs to convince the XO of his story, and get Hammersley to return in time before they all face a fiery death. Separately Hammersley has recovered a cache of forged Samaruan bank notes is destined to destabilise the fragile economy of the troubled islands. Guest actors: Alex Petersons, Sebastian Wichne, Adam Fawns, Todd Levi, Robert Reitano, Jimmy Christiansen.
19	6	"Birds"	Ian Berry	Matt Ford	5 May 2008	1.287
Hammersley’s crew have been joined by an agent from the Marine Protection Agency, Campbell Fulton, and he accompanies them when they board a FFV fishing for Trochus. The boarding appears to be mostly standard until they make a grisly discovery; one of the fisherman has been locked inside a barrel, and dies shortly after discovery. Back on Hammersley, Campbell Fulton has taken a liking to Nicky, but so far she has been brushing off his advances, so when he overhears her talking with ET he sees an opportunity to use the information about their relationship to his own advantage. Later in her cabin, he tries to kiss her but when she pushes him away and threatens to report him, he uses her relationship with ET as a threat to keep her mouth shut, and forces himself onto her. She manages to fight him off, but knowing she has to keep her feelings for ET secret she can’t tell anyone what he has done. Back on the FFV, Swain warns that the dead fisherman could be the result of bird-flu, so ET is none too happy about being assigned to sail the boat to port especially when Campbell Fulton is assigned with him. When a fight breaks out on the FFV between Fulton and ET that results in ET becoming trapped below deck the crew are forced to overcome their worries about the bird flu and help their friend. With ET trapped and water coming in through a breach in the hull, Swain and the CO fear they may need to resort to drastic measures to free him before he drowns. As the rescue becomes desperate it becomes obvious to everyone that Nicky has feelings for ET beyond that of just friends, and she has no choice but to tell the XO the truth about the attack by Campbell Fulton. Guest actors: Andrew Buchanan, Trent Huen, Shea Adams.
20	7	"Hidden Agendas"	Geoff Bennett	Philip Dalkin	12 May 2008	1.394
Swain is distraught when he gets an e-mail from home telling him his wife has left and he is not to contact her, but he is forced to put aside his worries when a young boy he has befriended from the Samaru Islands becomes entangled with illegal gun smuggling and is later kidnapped. Kate and Jim's romantic getaway turns into a life-or-death struggle when they encounter rebel forces and the kidnapped boy. Guest actors: Michael Tuahine, Patrick Jhanur, Steven Harman, Ling-Hsueh Tang, Daisy Betts, Rico Lescott, Joyce McNeill, Steve Daddow, Josh Elkington, Sam Elia.
21	8	"Heart of Glass"	Ian Berry	Samantha Winston	19 May 2008	1.38
Bomber's 21st birthday celebrations are cut short when she and Spider are lost overboard, and their rescuers are not as benevolent as they first appear. Meanwhile Buffer secretly deals with a personal tragedy. Guest actors: Eugene Gilfedder, Lexie Symon, Scott McRae, Lee O'Shaughnessy, Steve Harmon.
22	9	"Shadow Line"	Geoff Bennett	Tony Morphett	26 May 2008	1.505
When the crew of Hammersley rescue a lone survivor of a pirate attack, they discover that his fellow crew have been murdered and the culprits sound very similar to the men who attacked and stabbed Charge. Wanting revenge for their friend Hammersley start the hunt for the pirates who turns out to be a foreign mercenary, but Charge is less than keen to be reunited with his attacker, preferring to put the matter behind him and move on. When Hammersley catches up with the foreign mercenary he manages to slip his bonds and escape onto an Island leading to a land search. Three teams pursue him into the jungle, but he attacks Spider knocking him unconscious and stealing his gun. He then turns the gun on Kate who puts up the fight of her life to survive his attack. Guest actors: Brad McMurray, Will Wensley, Ariu Lang Sio, Hayley Mitchell, Lee O'Shaughnessy.
23	10	"Rules of Engagement"	Ian Barry	Jeff Truman	2 June 2008	1.471
Captain Roth's patrol gets ambushed, leaving three dead and severely injuring Mike Flynn during the rescue. Kate is now in charge of Hammersley, and has to deal with a stowaway who has become close to ET hoping that she can use his affections to escape Samaru and get to Australia. The XO declines her request telling her they have no choice but to send her home. However, when they try to land back on one of the 'safer' Islands they are confronted by local bandits who want to take the young woman for themselves. Kate uses a trick picked up from Jim Roth to outsmart the bandits, and the young woman is returned safely to Hammersley. Guest actors: Emelia Burnset
24	11	"A Brilliant Career"	Geoff Bennett	Michaeley O'Brien	9 June 2008	1.491
With Mike still recovering in hospital from the wound to his leg, Hammersley is assigned a new Commanding Officer, an 'old-school' CO and old friend of Charge. Everything starts well, but his orders start to become erratic. He takes an immediate dislike to Kate, setting her up to fail, but as his decisions start to place the lives of the crew and the safety of the ship at risk Kate has no choice to step in and take back command of the ship. Meanwhile, the mercenary who stabbed Charge is in the same hospital as Mike, and Mike tries to get some information from him. He appears to be recovering but then suddenly and mysteriously dies. Mike Flynn gets out of hospital to return to his command of Hammersley. Mike believes Ray Walsman is involved with the death of the mercenary and in an illegal shipping business. Guest actors: Geoff Morrell, Brad McMurray, Kaitlyn Clare, Peter Adams.
25	12	"Friends Close, Enemies Closer"	Ian Berry	Felicity Packard	16 June 2008	1.489
Buffer's new girlfriend has decided to take a holiday, and since Buffer is not available she is going with another friend – a male friend. Buffer trusts her, but the banter of his shipmates soon make him question his trust and he starts a desperate attempt to try to contact her. On shore leave, and still grumpy with his ship mates who are continuing to wind him up, Buffer sees a person that he thinks could be part of the rebel forces behind the attacks on Samaru, so decides to follow him. His pursuit leaves him locked in a cargo container which soon puts to sea. The following day, and Hammersley is due to sail, but no-one can find Buffer until Charge notices a voicemail from Buffer which goes some way to explaining his disappearance, and Hammersley sets out to find what has happened to him. The container ship with Buffer on board pulls into shore, and Buffer is able to get a short message to Hammersley, but with very little information about his location. Buffer decides to follow the mercenaries to their camp, and is surprised to see Ray Walsman is running the operation. Using his phone to take photos and gather evidence, just as his girlfriend calls and the noise alerts the mercs to his presence. Taken prisoner by the mercs, Walsman orders him to be killed. Hammersley are in a desperate search to find him, knowing he is in trouble, but with little to go on, and all the while they are searching Buffer, with a gun to his head, has been ordered to dig his own grave. Guest actors: Aaron Fa'aosa, Goran D. Kleut, Bo Kaan, Colin Handley, Ben Siemer, Sharm Brown, Rico Lescott.
26	13	"Soldiers of Fortune"	Ian Berry	John Ridley	23 June 2008	1.486
The net is tightening on Ray Walsman, and a warrant is issued for his arrest for his involvement with illegal gun running and tampering with the elections on Samaru, as well as the order he gave to have Buffer killed. Hammersley catch him and hand him over to the Samaru authorities to be charged with attempted murder, but he engineers an escape and reignites the coup on Samaru to cover his escape. At the same time, Hammersley are escorting a small group of UN officials, but one of their number is not who he claims and makes an attempt on Buffer's life – the only man who can really put Walsman in jail. The CO and Buffer interrogate the man and get a lead on Walsman's position and set a trap for him. When they catch him on his boat, Buffer gets the chance to exact revenge on the man who tried to kill him – twice. Guest actors: Damien Cassidy, Aaron Fa'aosa, Yves Chapand, Colin Handley, David Martin, Darryl Walsh, Rene Perrin, Ben Siemer, Jimmy Christiansen, Ben Siemer, Jamie Hite, Ben Siemer, Mark Ferguson.

== DVD release ==
The second season of Sea Patrol – Sea Patrol II: The Coup – was released on Region 4 DVD on 6 November 2008.

== See also ==
- List of Sea Patrol episodes
