= Sea Patrol season 1 =

Sea Patrol
- Season 1
- DVD cover
- No. of episodes: 13

Release
- Original network: Nine Network
- Original release: 5 July – 4 October 2007

Season chronology
- Next → Season 2

The first season of the Australian drama series Sea Patrol premiered on Nine Network on 5 July 2007. The 13-episode season concluded on 4 October 2007. Set aboard HMAS Hammersley, an old Royal Australian Navy (RAN) patrol boat, the series follows the ship's company as they are seen investigating the deaths of several people who are linked by a web of intrigue.

Filming of this series began in October 2006 and concluded in February 2007. Most of the footage was shot aboard the patrol boat HMAS Ipswich, with up to 60 cast members, film crew, and ship's company. Other filming occurred on Dunk Island, Queensland, at the Movie World Studios at the Gold Coast, Queensland, and in Sydney.

The show was one of the most eagerly awaited ones of 2007, with the project marking Lisa McCune's return to television acting. Ratings for the first episode were the second-highest for a drama premiere in Australian history and surpassed the NRL State of Origin match earlier in the week.

Initial reviews were mixed, with a concern that the series would be restricted by the early time slot, poor scripts, and clichéd characters and storylines. Critical reception improved as the series progressed, but ratings fell.

== Plot ==
The first season story arc involves the Australian Federal Police's investigation into the death of marine biologist Dr. Lisa Holmes, Kate's relationship with freighter Captain Rick Gallagher, Mike's relationship with Lisa's partner, Dr. Ursula Morrell, and the deaths of two fishermen, Carl Davies and Sam Murray. These threads increasingly intertwine throughout the season, culminating in the final two episodes, in which it is revealed that Gallagher hired Ursula and Lisa to manufacture a deadly toxin from an unusual venomous crab that he planned to sell on the black market. The plot is thwarted, the boat carrying the poison is sunk, Gallagher is killed and Ursula's death is staged as she enters a witness protection program.

During the season, Nav and ET develop a relationship despite adversities: Chefo gets engaged to his girlfriend; Swain's wife, Sally, gives birth; Charge reluctantly gets help and recovers from an eye injury; Spider loses friend and shipmate Jaffah to a jellyfish sting; Robert comes to terms with his father's death; and Lt. Daryl Smith has a mostly off-screen and implied relationship with AFP Agent Alicia Turnball.

== Production ==
Filming for this season started on 9 October 2006 and concluded on 20 February 2007. The Pacific Film and Television Corporation offered the producers $750,000 as an incentive to film the series in Queensland.

Much of the filming was carried out in tropical Queensland on a RAN patrol boat. This boat was built to accommodate 24 people, but up to 60 members of cast and crew were aboard the small boat, and a vast catamaran was used by the wardrobe department.

HMAS Ipswich was used to film Sea Patrol.

Filming schedule:

- Dunk Island (tropical island, Queensland) for eight weeks
- Sydney for six weeks
- Gold Coast Movie World Studios for six weeks

== Casting ==
=== Main ===
Actor	Character	Rank	Position
Ian Stenlake	Mike "CO" Flynn RAN	Lieutenant-Commander	Commanding Officer
Lisa McCune	Kate "XO" McGregor RAN	Lieutenant	Executive officer
Saskia Burmeister	Nikki "Nav" Caetano	Lieutenant	Navigator
John Batchelor	Andy "Charge" Thorpe	Chief Petty Officer	Chief Engineer
Matthew Holmes	Chris "Swain" Blake	Petty Officer	Coxswain/Chief Medic
Jeremy Lindsay Taylor	Pete "Buffer" Tomaszewski	Petty Officer	Boatswain
Kristian Schmid	Robert "RO" Dixon	Leading Seaman	Radio Operator
David Lyons	Josh "ET" Holiday	Leading Seaman	Electronics Technician
Josh Lawson	Toby "Chefo" Jones	Able Seaman	Chef/Assistant Medic
Jay Ryan	Billy "Spider" Webb	Seaman	Boatswain's Mate

=== Recurring ===
Actor	Character
Sibylla Budd	Dr. Ursula Morrell
Steve Bisley	Commander Steven 'Steve' Marshall
Morgan O'Neill	Lieutenant Darryl Smith
Christopher Stollery	Federal Agent Gregory 'Greg' Murphy
Martin Lynes	Richard 'Rick' Gallagher
Tye Harper	Seaman John 'Jaff' Jaffah
Pearl Tan	Federal Agent Alicia Turnball

== Episodes ==
No. overall	No. in season	Title	Directed by	Written by	Original release date	AUS viewers (millions)
1	1	"Welcome Aboard"	Chris Martin-Jones	Tony Morphett	5 July 2007	1.98
Hammersley intercepts a Foreign Fishing Vessel (FFV) and, after forcing the FFV to stop, boards it, and discovers some Asian fishermen. ET and Jaffah remain on the FFV while it is towed back to base by Hammersley. Hammersley answers a distress call from a marine biologist on Bright Island, and they release the FFV under its own steam and the care of ET and Jaffah. The distress call becomes a medical emergency and the crew discovers that a young woman scientist has been poisoned and Swain, the boat's medical officer, is forced to perform a tracheotomy on her. Whilst on the Island, newly arrived Able Seaman Bill Webb, "Spider", who is suffering the effects of seasickness, meets up with two fishermen. Still very naive and new to Navy life, Spider is delighted to accept a gift of fresh crab the fishermen have recently caught, and returns the catch to Hammersley to share with his ship mates. The young woman from the Island has been returned safely to Hammersley, but despite all the attempts at resuscitation by Swain and Hammersley's 2IC and executive officer, Lieutenant Kate "XO" McGregor, the woman dies. Back on the FFV, the fishermen are making dinner and accidentally set their vessel alight and its crew, with Jaffah and ET, are forced to abandon ship. Although wearing life-jackets they start to panic that Hammersley will not find them, and ET struggles to maintain calm. When Hammersley arrives back at base, the CO discovers that the Australian Federal Police (AFP) are very interested in the death of the marine biologist, Lisa Holmes. When Holmes' colleague, Doctor Ursula Morelle, arrives to identify the body, it appears that she may be hiding something, and the CO becomes very interested in Bright Island, and in the very attractive doctor. Guest actors: Steve Nation, Damien Garvey, Melanie Munt, Gary Lo, Haven Tso, Ben Clemments.
2	2	"What Lies Beneath"	Chris Martin-Jones	Tony Morphett	12 July 2007	1.662
While transporting AFP officers Greg Murphy and Alicia Turnbull to Bright Island, Hammersley encounters a sophisticated buoy. Thinking that the buoy is being used for drug trafficking, the crew leave it and plan a stakeout. The crew spot a boat approaching the buoy, but when it quickly turns away they think their cover has been compromised, so they make plans to find out what the buoy is attached to. When Swain and ET dive down to collect the buoy, they realise it is a bomb which explodes, almost killing them. Realizing that the explosion was remotely detonated, they make plan to pursue the suspects by following their last known course. On tracking down the boat they find two young men on board, who are middlemen in a drug smuggling operation. When one man discloses the location of a second buoy, Hammersley heads for it, hoping to get there before it too explodes. The XO tricks one of the men into identifying the drug bosses, and the crew hands the case over to the federal police. Sub-stories: The Nav is beginning to realise that she has growing affection for ET having nearly watched him being blown up. Kate becomes jealous of the CO's relationship with the marine biologist, Ursula Morelle, and is suspicious something more is going on. Swain is concerned when he hears his wife may be showing signs of pre-eclampsia. Guest actors: Matthew Le Nevez, Rick Donald, Mark Franks.
3	3	"Ghost of Things Past"	Chris Martin-Jones	Michaeley O'Brien	19 July 2007	1.799
Hammersley battles through a fierce storm, which causes a power outage and a near breach of the boat. Following the storm, there is much talk of ghost ships, mostly due to Chefo. When Spider thinks he has spotted a ghost ship, Hammersley discovers that it is, in fact, an abandoned catamaran. The crew board it and leave ET and Spider to accompany it to base, thinking that the owner had been washed overboard in the storm. Upon consultation of the man's wife, the crew and NavCom conclude the man has committed suicide and discontinue their search. The CO doubts this, however, and keeps searching. When Hammersley finally finds the man, he is freezing and floating in the water, but still alive. A relieved NavCom break the good news to his wife that he has been found alive and well. However, when Hammersley receives a photograph of the missing man, Rory Kinsella, the photograph is not of the man they found and brought aboard, instead it is revealed that the man aboard Hammersley is in fact Kinsella's best mate, Steve Jackson, and that Steve murdered Kinsella when he heard that Kinsella was going to leave his wife. Guest actors: Paul Gleeson, Liz Buchaanan, Ben Wood.
4	4	"Irukandji"	Chris Martin-Jones	Jeff Truman	26 July 2007	1.617
The crew of Hammersley receive a mayday call from a boat that claims it is being attacked by pirates. Upon investigation, the crew that issued the mayday call were intoxicated and shot a flare at the pirates, causing them to retreat. Hammersley pursues the suspected pirate boat and, when they board it, find it to be barely seaworthy; the 'pirates' are a family of terrified illegal immigrants attempting to reach Australia. The flare fired by men on the other boat has injured one of the immigrants, while attempting to help them by transferring them to Hammersley, they are scared and throw a bucket of waste water at the crew. Returning to Hammersley with the reluctant immigrants, Chefo and Jaffah both suddenly collapse with sudden pains to their arm and hand, and the rest of the crew assume the waste water was contaminated. It turns out an irukandji jellyfish, a deadly jellyfish which is the size of a pinhead, has attached itself to the RHIB and Chefo and Jaffah were stung when stowing the RHIB away. Charge is also stung on the eyelid, but his reaction is less severe and he insists he can continue to work despite being in pain and having loss of vision in one eye. When one of the immigrant family, a young girl, is suspected of falling overboard, Mike is forced to choose between saving Chefo and Jaffah's lives by racing to Cairns or turning the boat around to search for the girl. Swain is put in the difficult situation of needing to care for Chefo and Jaffah, but with Chefo's condition worsening he focusses on him, leaving Spider to look after Jaffah. When Jaffah appears to be recovering Spider leaves him to help the search for the girl, but when he returns he finds Jaffah dead, from an assumed aneurysm. Swain blames himself for focusing on Chefo, but Mike tells him there was nothing more he could have done. Buffer befriends one of the immigrants who can speak some English, and questions his job –and Australian law–when he is forced to hand over the family to the immigration department, knowing they will be placed in detention and likely deported. The crew of Hammersley are forced to say farewell to Jaffah, and feel grief. Guest actors: Todd Levi, Andre Seager, Sepideh Madah, Joseph Jahani, Jasmine Jahani, Shahnaz Kikravezh.
5	5	"Under the Radar"	Chris Martin-Jones	Marcia Gardner	2 August 2007	1.601
The crew of Hammersley intercept an FFV collecting shark fins. In an effort to find "the mothership", Hammersley crew interrogate the FFV crew about their bosses, learning that the ship is called Coral Emperor. Before attempting to pursue Coral Emperor, Hammersley has to return to base with the captured FFV and en-route receives a call requesting a pickup on Bright Island from Dr. Ursula Morrell, who has returned to continue her work there. The CO finds that Charge's eye injury is affecting his work, and orders him to see the doctor onshore. Charge fears that his injury may cause his career aboard patrol boats to end, and that he may be forced to accept an office job. The XO suffers a case of the green-eyed monster, suspecting that Dr Morrell and the CO may have developed affections for each other. Charge receives treatment for his eye, and is relieved to discover he will make a full recovery and quickly returns to the ship. He is happy that his future as chief engineer on Hammersley is assured. Finally able to go after Coral Emperor, Hammersley encounters a group of eco-militants who illegally disable the other boat. When the eco-militants are fired upon by Coral Emperor's crew, the crew of Hammersley abandon are forced to abandon their interception of Coral Emperor and rescues the militants, who seem to be very ungrateful for the crew's help. Once the eco-militants are safe, Hammersley resumes its interception and discovers the attack by the eco-militants was successful, and Coral Emperor is sinking. The CO angered by the eco-militants attack and the threat to life the present, decides to mount a sting to catch them out, and the XO, Buffer, ET and Spider go undercover aboard Coral Emperor to catch the remaining eco-militants when they come back for their crew. Returning to port following a successful mission, Mike finds that Dr Morrell has moved house and has left no details. Due to this sudden and unexpected move, Mike starts to become more suspicious of the doctor and the events on Bright Island. Guest actors: Leighton Cardo, Monroe Remiers, Fernarndo Henriques, Valentino Del Toro, Kate Alstergren, Shane Lee, Antonio Soares, Michael Cook, Ben Clements.
6	6	"Precious Cargo"	Chris Martin-Jones	John Ridley	9 August 2007	1.581
Hammersley nearly collides with a lost shipping container, washed overboard from a ship during a night-time storm. Upon investigation, the RO and ET discover that the shipping container contains a number of North Korean refugees. In trying to open the container RO hurts his arm but decides to treat the wound himself rather than seeking help. Two friends aboard a luxury boat have also come across the container, and when met by Hammersley, the crew realises that these are the men who gave Spider the crabs on Bright Island. Later, the men's boat is found ransacked and one man is found dead, while the other man, Carl Davies, is missing. The RO receives news that his father has died but does not appear upset by the news, which worries the CO and XO. Later while helping with a rescue RO collapses and the seriousness of his arm wound is discovered. He has lost a lot of blood, and Swain states he doesn't have the skill to stitch the wound properly. One of the refugees, Dr. Soong, comes to the aid of RO and stitches up a deep wound on his arm. After the refugees are brought onshore, RO visits Dr Soong at the hospital and discovers there is a second container of refugees on another ship containing Dr Soong's family. At RO's desperate urging Hammersley races to find the ship with the second container before it can get through and land. The crew narrow the list down to two ships: Pacific Mariner and Prince Alexander. A thorough search of Pacific Mariner yields nothing but containers full of bottled water, but thankfully the crew find the other container of refugees on Prince Alexander and RO is able to reunite Dr Soong with his family. Mike becomes increasingly worried about Ursula's disappearance and is disturbed when he asks the federal police, who deny that anything is going on. Kate is wooed by the charming civilian captain of the freighter Pacific Mariner, not knowing that he is not what he seems. Guest actors: Steve Nation, Damien Garvey, John Claire Lee, Matthew Whittett, Jack Heywood, Laura Pike, Jeamin Lee, Jordan Ling.
7	7	"Rescue Me"	Geoff Bennett	John Ridley	16 August 2007	1.586
Hammersley receives an emergency signal from an EPIRB and, upon investigation, finds a young female sailor who claims she has been attacked by pirates and forced from her yacht. They find that she is Claire Watts, who is trying to navigate around Australia, raising money for charity. Later, Hammersley finds her yacht, Claire de Lune, and are able to reunite Clare with it to continue her voyage. The XO becomes suspicious when Claire de Lune is not damaged but puts aside her concerns. A short time later, Hammersley receives another mayday, and they are called up to rescue Claire again, but this time find Claire de Lune has been ransacked. Despite this Claire asks to be returned to continue her voyage. Hammersley manages to track down the pirates and attempt an interception, but they are forced to return to shore when members of the crew start to suddenly fall ill with severe food poisoning, caused by the crabs (the ones gifted to Spider on Bright Island). While the crew recover in hospital the CO discovers that HMAS Kingston has intercepted the pirates. Hammersley returns to normal duties, and during an attempt to intercept an FFV, another mayday call is received, again from Claire Watts who is supposedly being attacked by the captured pirates. Hammersley is forced to sail through potentially dangerous un-surveyed waters to rescue Ms. Watts. When they bring her on board, they discover her secret: her father, who is not dead, was dishonourably discharged from the Navy and she hates the Navy for it. When confronted she pulls a gun on ET, for whom she has developed a warped fascination. The CO manages to talk her down and lower the gun, but it is clear she is very disturbed and in need of professional help. Guest actors: Nadia Townsend, Matthew Whittett, Glen Bauer, Gavin Schofield.
8	8	"Through the Storm"	Geoff Bennett	Chris Hawkshaw	23 August 2007	1.466
Spider saves the life of a boy after discovering an unexploded sea mine, washed ashore during a cyclone. Kate is humiliated when she sees a video of Chefo's bucks night. Spider fears his career may be over when he is caught impersonating an officer. Guest actors: Damien Garvey, Monette Lee, Rel Hunt, Trent Sullivan, Deven Wilson, Zak Young.
9	9	"Under the Hammer"	Geoff Bennett	Jeff Truman	30 August 2007	1.337
Fire breaks out in sHammersley's engine room. The ship's mascot is stolen by a rival Patrol Boat crew, and bad luck ensues. An eye injury threatens to destroy Charge's career. ET makes a vow of chastity to prove himself to Nikki. Guest actors: Monroe Reimers, Kate Garvin, Daisy Betts.
10	10	"Damage Control"	Geoff Bennett	Sarah Smith	6 September 2007	1.341
The crew assist a father and his children when their ship has engine trouble. After heading off, a curious Swain learns the father has just kidnapped the children from their mother and plans to flee, so Hammersley chases after them. They pursue the family into a crocodile-infested swamp, where they stumble a badly-mauled fisherman who turns out to be Carl Davies, the missing fisherman from the luxury yacht, and the man who supplied Spider with the contaminated crabs which caused so many of the crew to suffer food poisoning. Mike and ET manage to find the family and rescue them from crocodiles, and head back to port to save a fading Carl. Unfortunately the father tries to kill himself and the ship is delayed dealing with him. They all manage to get home but Carl dies en route to the hospital, leaving Mike with more questions to answer: Who has dumped him there, what is his link to Pacific Mariner and how does this all link in to the mystery of Bright Island? Guest actors: Damien Garvey, Brian Meegan, Djashaya Kanaki, George Druery, Justin Palazzo Orr, Kate Garvin.
11	11	"Chinese Whispers"	Geoff Bennett	Tony Morphett	13 September 2007	1.265
Just off the coast from Bright Island, Hammersley intercept what appears to be a suspicious meeting of two boats at sea, but they discover too late that they have in fact interrupted a sting by the Feds into diamond smuggling. The federal agents are furious, and accuse Mike of becoming obsessed with Bright Island, telling him stay away. This only makes Mike more suspicious and more determined to find out the truth. Back on patrol, Hammersley receives a mayday. From a sinking ship, Pacific Investigator, they rescue the grateful crew, and are not worried when the captain asks that the position of the ship is not reported as he is worried about someone claiming salvage. Ahead of schedule for their return to Cairns, Hammersley stops to host a steel beech bar-b-que for their guests. Swain, excited about the impending birth of his first child, gets talking to one of the sailors, Jake, for advice about parenthood when one is away at sea. Worried about his wife and preoccupied with thoughts of becoming a dad, Swain is unable to sleep and is on deck when the captain from Pacific Investigator pulls a gun on him, telling him they need to take the RHIB, and will be taking him along as insurance. In making their escape they shoot another member of Hammersley's crew and in the confusion get away clear. By sunrise they have returned to their sinking ship, where Swain discovers they are the diamond smugglers and they will kill him to save their cargo. Having secured the diamonds on the RHIB they have no future use for Swain and tie him up in a hold below deck. Not wanting to follow too close for fear that they would shoot Swain, Hammersley is some distance away, but when they see on the radar the smugglers leaving their sinking ship they realise they need to move quickly to find out what has happened to Swain. Back in the boat, Swain has been tied securely, and struggles frantically to free his hand. All the while the water is rising more quickly around him as the boat sinks. Will he live to see his wife and baby? Will Buffer and the crew of Hammersley get to him before he drowns? How long can he hold his breath? Guest actors: Daisy Betts, Monroe Reimers, Callan Mulvey, Iaian Sinclair, Justin Palazzo Orr, Murray Burt, Matthew Whittett.
12	12	"Deep Water"	Geoff Bennett	Kristen Dunphy	27 September 2007; NSW, ACT & QLD; 4 October 2007; VIC, TAS, SA & WA	1.172
Swain has been given time off to attend the birth of his first child, that is, until his replacement gets the flu, and Hammersley is tasked with rescuing a teenage couple who appear to have run out of petrol. Meanwhile, Mike gets a DVD delivered by courier with information that a boatload of tourists will be killed within 24 hours as part of a bizarre terrorist publicity stunt, and the race is on to find the tourist boat and stop the attack before it is too late. They manage to track down the boat and discover the tourists are all fine, just a little hot and bothered from a long walk to a local attraction. It is then that Kate makes the connection that the poison is in the water the tourists were to be given, and this is the same bottled water that she has seen previously aboard Pacific Mariner. The girlfriend of the rescued teenage couple is heavily pregnant and goes into labour on the boat, and it is discovered that the boyfriend has escaped prison to be with her for the birth. They had stolen the boat, and were trying to runaway to Bali. Swain finds himself having to help the girl give birth on Hammersley, knowing he is unable to get home to be at the bedside for the birth of his own child. Guest actors: Lindsay Farris, Erica Lovell, Sam Sith, Rebecca Barrett, Daisy Betts, Michael Beattie, Craig Coventry, Veronica Sywak, Paul Lyons, Kathryn Perry.
13	13	"Cometh the Hour"	Chris Martin-Jones	Dave Warner	4 October 2007	1.209
It's Hammersley's last ever mission before she is retired. The crew risks life and ship to hunt down the rogue terrorist boat, Pacific Mariner, and retrieve or destroy its cargo of bottled water containing the biotoxin. Mike is forced to make the most difficult decision of his career when he orders his crew to open fire on the rogue ship, knowing Ursula is being held hostage on board. It is an emotional time for the crew as the Navy officially decommissions the long-serving HMAS Hammersley. ET transfers to a frigate, so he and Nikki can finally pursue their relationship. Kate accepts Mike's offer to remain his 2IC on the new and improved patrol boat. Guest actors: Lee Adamson, Nik Schodel, Shea Adams, Pete Hill, Yvonne Strahovski.

== Reception ==
=== Critical response ===
In 2007, Sea Patrol was one of the most eagerly awaited television series in Australia. The series marked Lisa McCune's return to television and the Nine Network's attempt to reclaim its former ratings.

Almost 2 million viewers watched the first episode; this was a first place in the ratings. It was the second most popular series premiere in Australian history. Sea Patrol's premiere drew a larger audience than the NRL State of Origin match broadcast the same week, a rarity for an untested local drama. Critics described the script as "...dated, unsophisticated and a little clichéd". In the Sun Herald, the television critic stated that "...the series is let down by a somewhat sinking script that fails to quickly engage". Hal McElroy was disappointed; he believed the Australian drama industry failed because of a lack of good writing and a "...fail[ure] to create stories that connected with mass audience". Another common complaint from critics was the "safety" of the story-lines. The series was developed as a 7:30 pm drama; story-lines had to be appropriate for that time-slot. These complaints lasted throughout the season. In The Daily Telegraph, for example, Sea Patrol was described as "decent but safe drama". This was not what the Nine Network had hoped from their $15 million drama.

The show was given a promising review from the Royal Australian Navy (RAN), published in Navy News, which stated that Navy personnel were glad the show did not "...embarrass the service or give false perceptions" and were also happy with the portrayal of life in the RAN. Regardless of the critical comments of Sea Patrol, Nine commissioned a second season before the first was broadcast.

With a theme worthy of James Bond and glorious footage of our coastal waters and shores, Sea Patrol sweeps over you like a well-made feature film. It looks terrific and, despite a certain predictability in the set-up and character types and some unlikely touchy-feely stuff nestled amid the blokey banter...there's enough going on to ensure viewer appeal...[A] cracking beginning to a promising new show.

— Ian Cuthbertson, Weekend Australian, 30 June 2007

While the critical response improved, ratings continued to drop throughout the season.

=== Ratings ===
The first episode of Sea Patrol was the second-highest rating series premiere, surpassing the debut of McLeod's Daughters at 1.89 million, but not the debut of Always Greener at 2.06 million, both of which were cancelled by their respective networks.

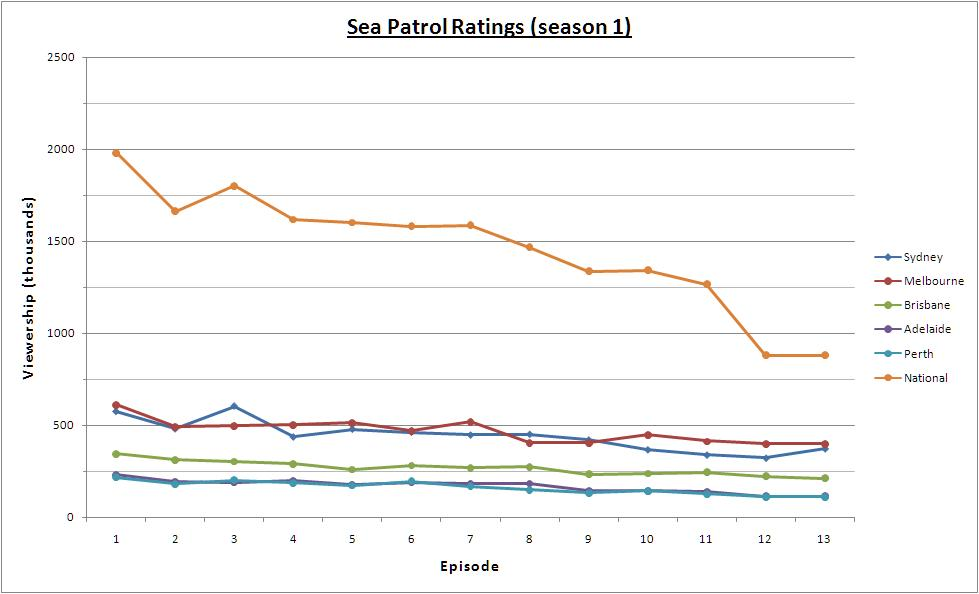
A visual representation of Sea Patrol's Australian television ratings

Episode number Production number	Title	Sydney	Melbourne	Brisbane	Adelaide	Perth	TOTAL	Weekly rank	Nightly rank
01; 1-01	Welcome Aboard	575,000	611,000	345,000	231,000	219,000	1,980,000	1	1
02; 1-02	What Lies Beneath	482,000	492,000	311,000	194,000	183,000	1,662,000	7	1
03; 1-03	Ghost of Things Past	604,000	498,000	302,000	191,000	204,000	1,799,000	3	1
04; 1-04	Irukandji	438,000	503,000	290,000	197,000	188,000	1,617,000	7	1
05; 1-05	Under the Radar	480,000	512,000	258,000	177,000	173,000	1,601,000	7	1
06; 1-06	Precious Cargo	464,000	471,000	281,000	189,000	176,000	1,581,000	7	1
07; 1-07	Rescue Me	448,000	517,000	268,000	184,000	169,000	1,586,000	7	1
08; 1-08	Through the Storm	452,000	407,000	273,000	183,000	150,000	1,466,000	10	1
09; 1-09	Under the Hammer	422,000	404,000	235,000	144,000	133,000	1,337,000	18	2
10; 1–10	Damage Control	369,000	447,000	237,000	144,000	143,000	1,341,000	18	3
11; 1–11	Chinese Whispers	341,000	414,000	244,000	138,000	129,000	1,265,000	27	4
12; 1–12	Deep Water	324,000	399,000	224,000	114,000	111,000	1,172,000	N/A (Note: "Deep Water" and "Cometh The Hour" were aired as a single two-hour special in some states and thus a weekly or nightly rank is not available.)	N/A
13; 1–13	Cometh the Hour	374,000	399,000	211,000	114,000	111,000	1,209,000	N/A	N/A

=== Awards ===
Sea Patrol was nominated for three awards at the 2008 Logie Awards. The nominees included Lisa McCune, who was nominated for Most Popular Actress and the Gold Logie for Most Popular Personality on Australian Television. David Lyons was nominated for Most Popular New Male Talent.

== Home media ==
Sea Patrol – The Complete First 13 Episodes
Set details	Special features
13 episodes (563 minutes); 4-disc set; 16:9 aspect ratio; Subtitles: English & English for the hearing impaired; English audio (Dolby Digital 5.1 Surround EX); Distributed by Roadshow Entertainment	Slipcase packaging
Release dates
Australia
17 October 2007
