= Storage (film) =

- Directed by: Michael Craft
- Written by: Michael Craft
- Starring: Saskia Burmeister; Robert Mammone
- Release date: 2009
- Running time: 90 minutes
- Country: Australia
- Language: English

Storage is a 2009 Australian horror film directed by Michael Craft and starring Saskia Burmeister and Robert Mammone.

It had its world premiere at the 2009 Dungog Film Festival.

== Cast ==
- Saskia Burmeister as Zia
- Robert Mammone as Francis
- Sally McKenzie as Carol
