= Pearl Tan =

Australian actress

- Born: Australia

Pearl Tan is an Australian television and film actress, writer, director and producer. She is most well known for her role on Sea Patrol as Federal Agent Alicia Turnbull, a role she had during the series' first season.

In 2009. she was awarded an Associate Mike Walsh Fellowship.
