= Roving commission =

Kind of commission's document, which is less limited than a regular one

A roving commission details the duties of a commissioned officer or other official whose responsibilities are neither geographically nor functionally limited.

Where an individual in an official position is given more freedom than would regularly be afforded to a person in the same role, they are described as having a roving commission.

Traditionally, a military officer receives a commission charging them with the duties and responsibilities of a specific office or position. A roving commission applies to military officers who are commissioned by their respective service without the requirement to serve at a specific military base or on a specific naval vessel.

Because officers with a roving commission are considered to have more freedom than other officers of a similar rank, they are often commissioned as such so that they can be moved between roles and responsibilities as a stop-gap measure.

== See also ==
- Ambassador at Large
- Commissioned officer
- Non-commissioned officer
- My Early Life: A Roving Commission – a 1930 book by Winston Churchill.
