= Kirsty Lee Allan =

Australian actress and fashion model (born 1984)

- Born: 15 December 1984 (age 41); Dubbo, New South Wales, Australia
- Other name: Kirsty Allan
- Occupation: Actress

Kirsty Lee Allan (born 15 December 1984 in Dubbo, New South Wales) is an Australian actress and former fashion model. She is most known for portraying Able Seaman Rebecca "Bomber" Brown in Sea Patrol.

== Career ==
Allan began her career as a model and dancer, after gaining a Diploma of Performing Arts from the Dance World Studios in South Melbourne. Her dance skills came into a career when she was a backup dancer for the Australian girl group Shakaya during their live concerts. Allan also starred in numerous theatre productions. Allan had a guest appearance on the SBS comedy Fat Pizza, playing Sharona. She also appeared in numerous television adverts.

Allan also appeared on the Australian TV series "Blue Heelers" where she played the role of Karin Sharp a past student who was abused by her maths teacher.

Allan joined the Australian TV drama Sea Patrol for its second season, which premiered on 31 March 2008 on Channel 9. She plays the character of Able Seaman Rebecca 'Bomber' Brown for Season 2, 3 and 4. In late 2010 it was reported that she would not be returning for the fifth season. She appeared as Leanne Murdoch in the SBS comedy Swift and Shift Couriers. She received a TV Week Logie nomination for Most Popular New Female Talent in 2009. In 2012, she guest appeared as Teena Milford in CSI: NY.

== Credits ==
- 2016 – Brock – as Michelle Downes
- 2012 – CSI:NY (Near Death) as Teena Milford
- 2008 – Sea Patrol – as Rebecca Brown
- 2008 – Swift and Shift Couriers as Leanne Murdoch
- 2005 – Pizza as Sharona
