= Conrad Coleby =

Australian actor and photographer

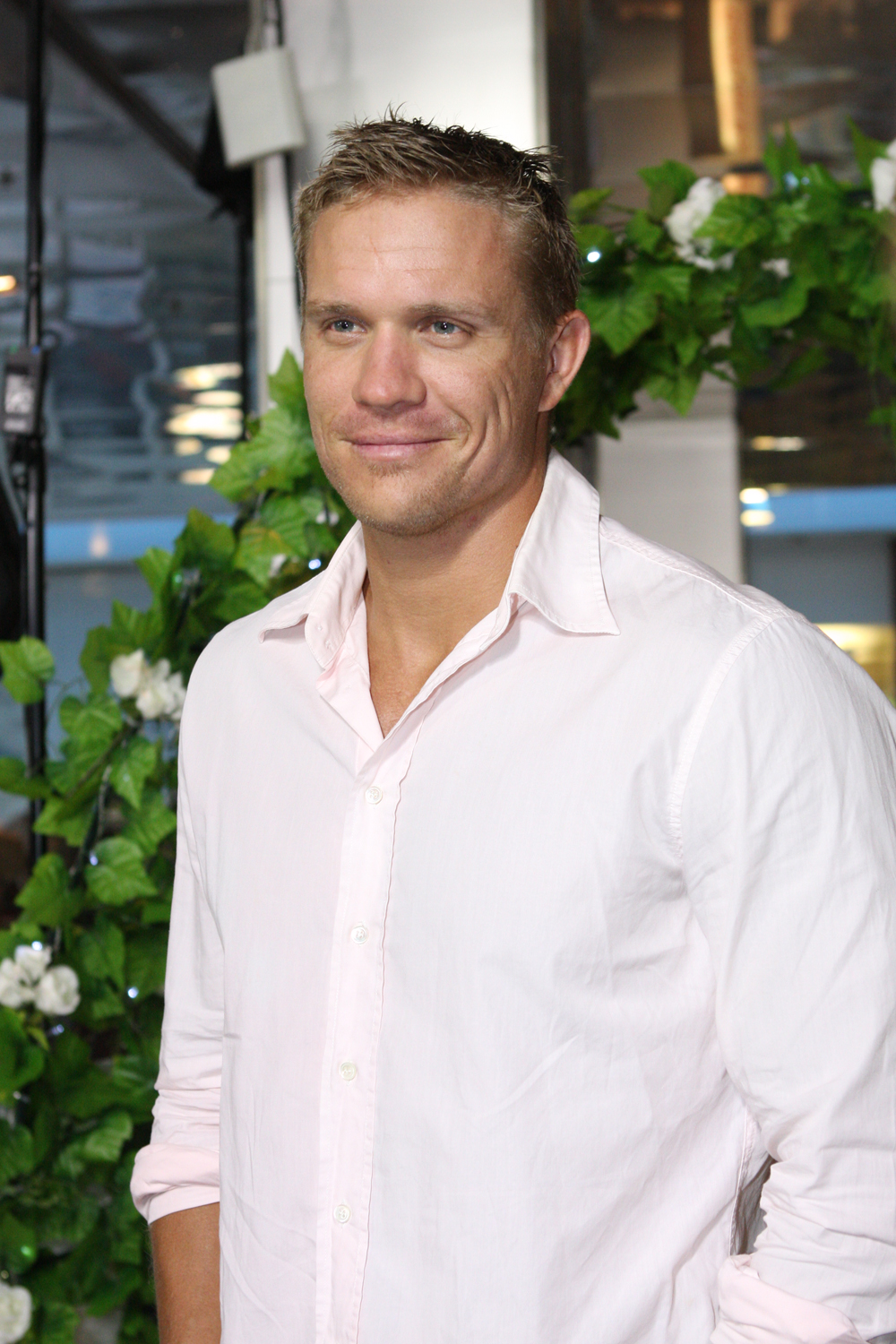
- Coleby in January 2012
- Born: Conrad Julius Taylor; 20 September 1979 (age 47); Sydney, New South Wales, Australia
- Occupations: Actor; photographer; voice artist
- Years active: 1989–present
- Parent: Robert Coleby (father)
- Relatives: Anja Coleby (sister)
- Website: conradtaylor.co

Conrad Julius Coleby (born Conrad Julius Taylor, 20 September 1979) is an Australian actor and photographer, whose roles have included Scott Zinenko on the medical drama All Saints, Adam Wilde in headLand, Roman Harris in Home and Away, and Dylan Mulholland in Sea Patrol. He also played Matthew Goddard in A Place To Call Home, and Vance Abernethy in Neighbours.

== Early life and education ==
Coleby was born in Sydney to actor Robert Coleby and former model Lena Taylor. His sister is actress and reporter Anja Coleby.

Coleby had his first acting role as a six month-old in an episode of sci-fi series Timelapse, when his father put him forward for the role. From the age of six, he attended the Mona Vale Film and Television School.before landing his first professional role as the son of a character who returns from war in 1989 miniseries Tanamera – Lion of Singapore. He once again appeared alongside his father.

Coleby attended high school at Somerset College on the Gold Coast, graduating in 1996. He continued his studies at tertiary level, completing a Bachelor of Creative Arts (Acting) at Queensland University of Technology. In his third year in 2000, Coleby travelled to Singapore, Los Angeles, New York and Stratford-upon-Avon, performing the title role of Lewis in Louis Nowra's Cosi, as part of the university's first ever world tour.

== Career ==
In 1999, before leaving drama school, Coleby appeared opposite Melissa Joan Hart, as Jerome Hestor in the TV movie Sabrina Down Under, which was filmed on the Great Barrier Reef in Queensland. Upon graduation, Coleby joined the Sydney Theatre Company to play the role of Stuey in Tony McNamara's new play The Recruit, alongside John Howard, Leeanna Walsman and Brendan Cowell, before landing television guest roles in Water Rats (2000), Flat Chat (2001) and Always Greener (2002).

Coleby then secured the role of series regular Scott Zinenko on the medical drama All Saints, playing the character from 2001 to 2004. The role saw him nominated for the Logie Award for Best New Talent in 2002. During his time on All Saints, Coleby also appeared in the Sydney Theatre Company's production of The Club by David Williamson at the Sydney Opera House. He then sang the principal role of Lieutenant Cable in Rodgers and Hammerstein's South Pacific at the Theatre Royal in 2005.

Coleby next landed a main role alongside Rachael Taylor, on drama series HeadLand in 2005, portraying student counsellor and former town resident Adam Wilde. In 2006, he appeared opposite Matt Nable and John Jarratt as Billy, in 2006 rugby league drama film The Final Winter. The following year, he performed the lead role of Tom in The Glass Menagerie by Tennessee Williams for Queensland Theatre Company. He was nominated for a Matilda Award for his performance.

From 2007 until 2009, Coleby played ex-SAS army officer and chef Roman Harris on long-running soap opera Home and Away.

Coleby was in the main cast of Navy drama series Sea Patrol in seasons four and five (2010–2011), playing the role of Petty Officer Bosun Dylan 'Dutchy' Mulholland. He then played the role of Syd Thompson in Underbelly: Razor, the 2011 fourth season of underworld crime series, Underbelly. In 2013, he starred as Trip Wyeth, opposite his father Robert Coleby (as Lyman Wyeth) in a Queensland Theatre / Black Swan Theatre Company production of Other Desert Cities.

In 2014, Coleby appeared opposite Hugh Jackman as Red Beard in Marvel superhero film The Wolverine. From 2017, in season five, he began appearing in period drama series A Place To Call Home, playing Matthew Goddard, the son of Douglas Goddard (Robert Coleby), who returns to town after his father's death and starts dating Olivia Bligh (Arianwen Parkes-Lockwood), before later asking her to marry him. Coleby then joined the guest cast of Neighbours as Vance Abernethy, the boyfriend of Roxy Willis (Zima Anderson), in May 2019.

On 20 November 2025, Coleby was announced as part of the cast for ABC crime drama miniseries Dustfall.

== Photography ==
Coleby is also an established commercial photographer specialising in architecture, portraiture and production stills for film and television. His imagery has featured in a number of exhibitions and publications including the work "Home", which was a finalist in the 2012 Wilsons Visual Arts Award. His portfolio can be located at https://www.conradtaylor.co.

== Filmography ==
=== Film ===
Year	Title	Role	Notes	Ref.
2007	The Final Winter	Billy	Feature film	
2012	Ryder Country	Ben Quaid		
2013	The Wolverine	Red Beard	Feature film	
2015	Past Imperfect	Ben	Short film	
2022	Dance With Me	Man	Short film (also director)	

=== Television ===
Year	Title	Role	Note	Ref.
1980	Timelapse		1 episode	
1989	Tanamera – Lion of Singapore	Benjy No. 3	Miniseries, 7 episodes	
1999	Sabrina Down Under	Jerome Hester	TV film	
2000	Water Rats	James St. Clare	2 episodes	
2001	Flat Chat		1 episode	
2001–2004	All Saints	Scott Zinenko	Main cast	
2002	Always Greener	Fantasy Cam		
2005–2006	headLand	Adam Wilde	Main cast	
2007–2009	Home and Away	Roman Harris	Series regular	
2010–2011	Sea Patrol	Dylan 'Dutchy' Mulholland	Main cast	
2011	Underbelly Razor	Wharton 'Syd' Thompson	Miniseries, 8 episodes	
2014	The Time of Our Lives	Brad Masters	2 episodes	
2017–2018	A Place to Call Home	Matthew Goddard	Recurring role	
2019	Time & Place	Oli Woodruffe	Web series	
2019	Neighbours	Vance Abernethy	Recurring role	
2023	NCIS: Sydney	Lieutenant Commander Lee	Episode 3: "Brothers in Arms"	
2026	Dustfall	Ross Kelly	Miniseries, 6 episodes	
TBA	The Beautiful Beer	Floki	Miniseries; In development	

== Theatre ==
Year	Title	Role	Company/theatre	Ref.
2000	Cosi	Lewis	QUT world tour of Singapore, Los Angeles, New York and Stratford-upon-Avon	
2000	The Recruit	Stuey	Sydney Theatre Company (STC)	
2003	The Club	Geoff	Sydney Opera House with STC	
2005	South Pacific	Lieutenant Cable	Theatre Royal, Sydney	
2007	The Glass Menagerie	Tom / Narrator	QPAC, Brisbane with QTC (QTC)	
2006	The Beauty Queen of Leenane		Belvoir, Sydney	
2009	Lady Macbeth of Mtsensk	Sergei	Belvoir, Sydney	
2013	Other Desert Cities	Trip Wyeth	QPAC, Brisbane, Heath Ledger Theatre, Perth with QTC and Black Swan Theatre Company	
2015	Brisbane	Frank / Andy West	QPAC, Brisbane with QTC	

== Awards and nominations ==
Year	Nominated work	Award	Category	Result	Ref.
2002	All Saints	Logie Awards	Most Popular New Talent	Nominated	
2007	The Glass Menagerie	Matilda Awards	Best Actor	Nominated	
2015	Past Imperfect	Canberra Short Film Festival	Best Actor (Canberra Section)	Won	
