= List of Sea Patrol characters =

Sea Patrol is an Australian television drama that was originally broadcast from 5 July 2007 until 12 July 2011. The series is set on board the fictional Royal Australian Navy (RAN) patrol boat HMAS Hammersley, and follows the lives of its crew members. The following is a list of main characters from the series.

== Main characters ==
=== Mike Flynn ===
Lieutenant Commander Mike Flynn -- ("CO") -- is the Hammersley's Commanding Officer ("CO"), and one of the two principal characters of the series, present from beginning to end. Played by Ian Stenlake.

=== Kate McGregor ===
Lieutenant Kate McGregor -- ("XO") -- is the Hammersley's Executive Officer ("XO") (second-in-command), and one of the two principal characters of the series, present from beginning to end. Played by Lisa McCune.

=== Andy Thorpe ===
Chief Petty Officer Andrew "Charge" Thorpe MBA is a fictional TV character on the show Sea Patrol. He is portrayed by John Batchelor. On HMAS Hammersley, Charge is the chief engineer. Swain tells us that Charge is a 41-year-old male in the episode "Dogs of war". He has a son, named Jamie, who is a midshipman in the navy.

He ultimately leaves the navy and becomes a mining engineer in Western Australia

=== Chris Blake ===
Petty Officer Chris Blake -- ("Swain") -- is the ship's coxswain/medic, and often the softening influence on various situations, and is present throughout the entire series. Played by Matt Holmes.

=== Robert Dixon ===
Leading Seaman Robert Dixon is a fictional TV character on the show Sea Patrol. He is portrayed by Kristian Schmid. Robert Dixon (also RO) is the radio operator on board HMAS Hammersley. RO usually makes pessimistic predictions about the events that take place in and around the Hammersley. He is known for his vast knowledge on foreign languages, his strange ability to keep calm and a straight-face at all times and his annoyance at almost everybody.

=== Nikki Caetano ===
Nicole "Nikki" Caetano, portrayed by Saskia Burmeister, made her first appearance on 5 July 2007.

Nikki is the ships navigator on-board HMAS Hammersley.

In season one, Nikki started a relationship with fellow shipmate ET. At the end of the season, ET takes a transfer off the ship so that he and Nikki can openly pursue a relationship.

In season two, Mike Flynn asks for an electronics technician to be posted about Hammersley due to multiple errors, and ET is asked personally by Cmdr Steve Marshall to be transferred back to Hammersley. ET reluctantly accepts as he knows refusing to take a Cairns posting as he wanted would create suspicion, but Nikki is mad at him for not refusing and does her best to avoid even talking to him for several episodes.

After a hostage situation aboard Hammersley (Takedown), Nikki starts to cool down as she admits she is happy to have him around, even though they can't be more than friends at that time. In Birds, the Hammersley crew then encounter Campbell Fulton, a Marine Wildlife Officer who tries to force himself on Nikki, but she rebuffs him. He then threatens her by revealing he knows about her and ET, and will tell if she tells anyone about his assault. Later Campbell and ET come to blows over Nikki and Campbell pushes ET into a ships hold.

ET is trapped under a heavy pipe in a flooding ship and Nikki is the one to try and reassure him. XO then realises that the feelings between Nikki and ET are more than friendly as Nikki struggles to hold it together at the prospect of losing ET. Her feelings are soon made apparent to the rest of the crew when she learns the only feasible way of saving him is to amputate his leg. She stops Swain from touching ET and instead offers a last-ditch solution which results in ET being freed and recovering.

When the XO finds out about Nikki and ETs secret love affair, she takes it professionally but decides not to say anything because of the friendship that XO and Nikki find between themselves. Nikki reveals vague details about Fultons attack to XO, which eventually leads to Fulton confronting Nikki, but she turns the tables by threatening to have him charged with ETs attempted murder. However Campbell is dismissed as a result of Mike Flynn reporting him for assault.

When ET gives her a clown fish and proposes to her, she is overcome, but begins to worry when ET misses the ship, after it had been crash sailed. When it's discovered ET was murdered along with the rest of his workmates on a diving boat, Nav is heartbroken and is tearful for most of the episode.

Throughout season three, Nikki became dangerously obsessive with proving that ET was murdered. When Nikki learns that ET was poisoned by having his air supply sabotaged, She soon centers her investigation on Matt and Simone Robsenn, who are operating an oil theft ring. Nikki soon discovers that the Robsenns are working with old rival Campbell Fulton. Hammersley rescues Fulton from near death after the Robsenns try to kill him to buy them time, using the same technique of sabotaging his airway.

Nikki confronts Campbell Fulton to get him to reveal that he was responsible for ETs death: He started working for the Robsenns and when ET joined the dive team, he recognised him from his past experiences with Hammersley. To prevent word of their activities from reaching authorities, the Robsenns orchestrated the deaths of the dive team including ET, but it was Fulton who sabotaged their airways.

=== Rebecca Brown ===
Rebecca "Bomber" Brown, portrayed by Kirsty Lee Allan, made her first appearance on 31 March 2008.

Rebecca is a young Navy sailor who became the new chef of the new Armidale-class HMAS Hammersley when the previous chef, Toby Jones left after the decommissioning of the Fremantle-class Hammersley. Bomber has some large boots to fill taking over from Chefo, but transferring to Hammersley from a larger frigate has given her some strong galley skills and she soon starts to fit in well with the rest of the crew, despite the afore mentioned episode with the chips.

Bomber's duties also include assisting Swain as Hammersley's second medic. Again, this a role she has taken over from Chefo, but an area where she is far less comfortable and often struggles to keep her emotions and her temper under control.

Bomber's joins Hammersley in the rank of Able Seaman and as she grows more confident she looks into the option of maybe going for promotion to Leading Seaman, but a series of unfortunate events get in her way, firstly causing her to question whether she sees any future in the Navy at all, and ending with the romance with 2-Dads causing her to finally reach the decision that the Navy is not the career she wants after all.

When Bomber started out on the ship, she realised that she had made good friends in RO and Spider. But Spider, who secretly likes her, kept on annoying her and soon she lost her temper. When the ship was doing a boarding drill organised by Buffer, Spider pushed her too far, over a minor incident about chips, and she nearly pushed him off the boat. Buffer and Swain stopped him from falling overboard. Her short temper caused Buffer to threaten her with disciplinary action. Spider refused to accept her initial apology. Bomber redeemed herself later, when she and Spider were trapped below deck on a ship used to smuggle venomous snakes. Bomber remained calm and devised a plan for them to escape. After this incident Spider accepted her apology and Buffer decided not to follow through on his threat, provided she kept her temper in check.

On Bomber's 21st birthday, she and Spider fall overboard while Buffer is distracted by his mother's terminal illness. Bomber takes charge and keeps calm, while trying to calm down the panicked Spider, using their uniforms as makeshift flotation devices. Because Buffer did not notice their absence it takes the crew of the Hammersley too long to notice they're gone. Before the Hammersley finds them Bomber spots a pleasure boat and they are rescued, only to realise that the boat is transporting an escaped criminal, the drug dealer Liam McClean. They manage to hide their identities (as Naval personnel) from McClean and his two accomplices until a radio broadcast asking for assistance in search and rescue of two navy sailors. When the boat is spotted by the search party, the Hammersley come to investigate. Bomber manages to leave her bracelet on the deck, but XO does not recognize it until she returns to the Hammersley and sees the ship's video-log. The Hammersley then head back to the boat with the aim of rescuing them. Bomber and Spider try to escape (with the help of the ship-owner's wife) but McClean spots them and forces Bomber to take him to the plane. The Hammersley manages to prevent the plane from landing and she and Spider are rescued.

During the hostage event she reveals to Spider that she and her mother were not on speaking terms and she later talks about her mother to Buffer as if they were on good terms.

Later in the series, her and RO's connection grows. RO likes Bomber and she is mutually attracted to him, but won't bring herself to admit it, plus, they can't act on it because it's against protocol. They both share a mutual respect, but Bomber loses her temper with RO when he mistakes her friendship for affection and reports to the CO that they have engaged in fraternisation in breach of protocol. RO redeems himself, but continues to have feelings for Bomber even though she insists they can only ever be friends.

In season 4 2Dads and Bomber share a night of passion while on shore leave. They are unsure of whether or not they are going to pursue their relationship, but while on the boat they kiss and are caught by Swain. Bomber decides to get a shore posting so that she and 2Dads can be together but in the 1st episode of season 5 we hear from 2Dads that Bomber has broken off the relationship via email.

=== Leo Kosov-Meyer ===
Leo Kosov-Meyer, portrayed by Nikolai Nikolaeff, made his first appearance on 18 May 2009.

Leo, better known as "2 Dads,” is the crew's Electronics Technician, replacing the late Leading Seaman Josh Holiday ("E.T").

2 Dads' time aboard the Hammersley starts off on the wrong foot. He buys a monkey and secretly stows it away on board the ship. He makes fast friends with Spider, and gets himself into much mischief, including a run-in into Buffer, over Nav's difficulties. Later in the episode, he releases the monkey, only to find the salesman whom he purchased the monkey from, but short-changed during payment. 2 Dads pulls off a daring rescue, earning the respect of the Navy personnel on Hammersley, except for Nav.

Later, in the episode “Pearls Before Swine,” 2 Dads is berated by Buffer and XO. This causes him to start a rumor that they are romantically involved. The rumor spreads throughout the ship, until it reaches the ears of the CO, who once had a relationship with the XO. CO finally traces the rumor's back to 2 Dads, and warns him that if he makes mischief again, not only will he leave Hammersley, his position in the Navy will be terminated. Buffer and XO are given the pleasure of charging him however they please. But when 2 Dads tells the two of his current position, XO takes pity on him and gives him the task of recovering the stolen pearls, believed to have been ingested by a party-goer they came across tracking some pearl thieves. 2 Dads laces their food with the ship's "industrial-strength" medical laxative with success, although details about the rest of the recovery remain undiscovered.

2 Dads has a laid-back and careless attitude - he's a joker, player, a monkey smuggler and all-round bad boy and Nav finds it hard to welcome him, as he is the replacement for the late ET, who was Nav's fiancé. Nav describes him as "up-himself and unprofessional." However, the crew do welcome him and he fast becomes 'one of them', proving himself Navy-worthy.

Despite this, in the series finale, it is revealed that he will eventually desert from the Navy when in port in Singapore.

=== Dylan Mulholland ===
Dylan "Dutchy" Mulholland, portrayed by Conrad Coleby, made his first appearance on 15 April 2010. The character is a replacement for Pete "Buffer" Tomaszewski, whose last appearance was in the final episode of season three.

"Dutchy", as he is known as by the crew, is a veteran of the Gulf War and was awarded the Medal for Gallantry (MG) after a boarding party incident, which ended with his Boarding Officer killed, which explains his protective behaviour towards Lieutenant Kate McGregor, HMAS Hammersley's XO and Dutchy's new boarding officer.

At the end of the series, it is revealed that he will serve in Afghanistan.

=== Jessica Bird ===
Jessica 'Gap Girl' Bird is a fictional television character portrayed by Danielle Horvat. She replaced Billy "Spider" Webb doing his Boatswain's Mate duties onboard HMAS Hammersley while doing her Gap Year in the RAN. Her first appearance was the first episode of Season 4. Jessica Bird is a young Navy sailor on HMAS Hammersley, after finishing high school she decided to sign up for a gap year on Navy patrol boat. Dutchy and the crew keep her under their wings. Bird is a favourite of the crew on whom to play pranks – particularly by 2Dads (Kosov-Meyer). In series five, Bird becomes Hammersley's chef after Bomber leaves Hammersley after her affair with 2Dads.

=== Maxine White ===
Commander Maxine "Knocker" White, played by Tammy MacIntosh in Series 4 and 5, is the shore-based Squadron Commander, over HMAS and some other patrol craft in her area of command. She is the immediate superior to HMAS Hammersley's Commanding Officer ("CO") Mike Flynn—and had a brief affair with him early in their careers. Later it is revealed that Mike is the father of her son Ryan, not her ex-husband, Stewart White. She and Mike briefly rekindle their relationship in season 5, but it does not last long.

=== Ryan White ===
Midshipman Ryan White, a naval cadet, played by Dominic Deutscher, takes his orientation cruise aboard HMAS Hammersley—apparently by the arrangement of his mother, the Hammersley's Squadron Commander, Commander Maxine 'Knocker' White, who has a past with the CO. Ryan is apparently her son by her ex-husband (Stewart White), the relationship between Ryan and CO Flynn grows increasingly complex and serious as the final season progresses, and ends dramatically. Along the way, Ryan's adventures and crew relations are complicated by his semi-official standing as crew, by his internal coming-of-age crises, and his past, particularly by his relationship to the boatswain/chef, Jessica 'Gap Girl' Bird, with whom he was attempting to pursue for a relationship before his assignment to Hammersley.

== Other major characters ==
- Pete "Buffer" Tomaszewski
- Josh "ET" Holiday
- Billy "Spider" Webb
- Toby "Chefo" Jones
