= Saskia Burmeister =

Australian actress (born 1985)

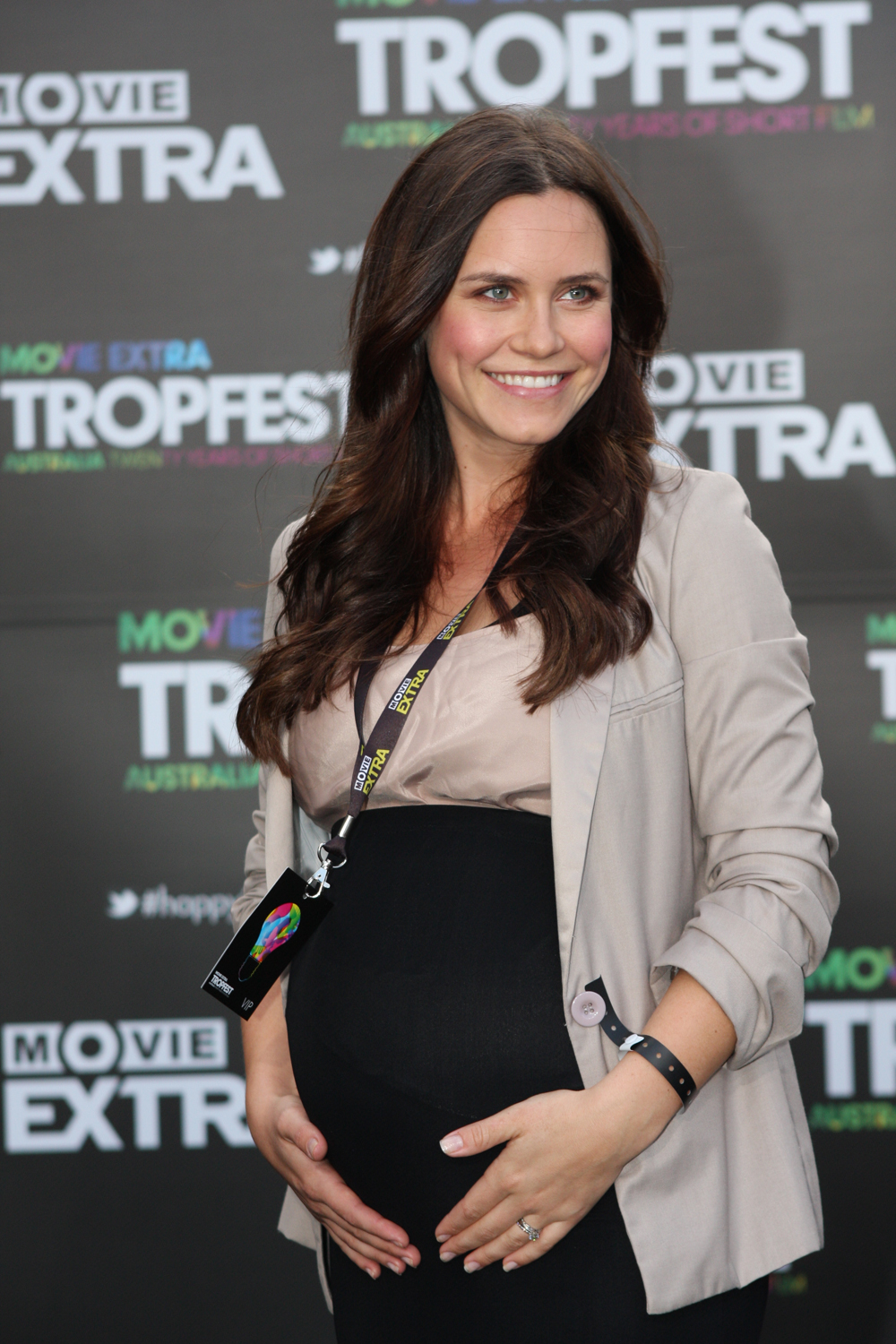
- Burmeister at Tropfest 2012
- Born: 12 February 1985 (age 41); Sydney, New South Wales, Australia
- Occupation: Actress
- Years active: 2000–present
- Spouse: Jamie Croft (m. 2008)
- Children: 2
- Relatives: Martika Sullivan (sister)

Saskia Burmeister (born 12 February 1985) is an Australian actress. She is most known for her roles in Hating Alison Ashley and Sea Patrol.

== Early and personal life ==
Born in Sydney, Burmeister grew up in Bellingen on the Mid-North Coast of New South Wales. She was educated at Mosman High School in Sydney, and trained at the Australian Theatre for Young People.

In February 2008, Burmeister married Australian actor Jamie Croft. Burmeister first met Croft at a film audition and after they played a couple in The Pact, they began dating. Burmeister and Croft have two sons together, Jackson Jay "JJ", born in May 2012, and Bodhi Phoenix in June 2014.

== Career ==
During high school, Burmeister performed in various theatre productions including Blackrock, The Merchant of Venice and The Chapel Perilous.

Burmeister joined the cast of Wicked Science as Dina Demiris in 2003. She appeared in the 2005 comedy film Hating Alison Ashley and received a nomination for Best Lead Actress from the Australian Film Institute (AFI) for her performance.

Burmeister made a guest appearance in Blue Heelers and earned the 2006 AFI Award for Best Guest or Supporting Actress in a Television Series for her performance in episode 493.

In 2007, Burmeister joined the cast of Sea Patrol as Nikki Caetano. That same year, Burmeister appeared in The Jammed and earned an AFI nomination for Best Supporting Actress.

On 24 April 2011, Lizzy Lovette of The Sun-Herald reported Burmeister had joined the cast of Home and Away. Burmeister had an extended guest role as Tegan Callahan. The actress bleached her usual brown hair blonde for the part. Burmeister's younger sister, Martika Sullivan, also landed a role in the show at the same time.

Burmeister joined the cast of Black & White & Sex in 2012 and had a guest role in Tricky Business.

== Filmography ==
=== Film ===
Year	Title	Role	Notes
2002	The Junction Boys	Joyce	TV movie
2003	Ned Kelly	Jane Jones	Feature film
2003	The Pact	Young Susan Tuttle	Feature film
2004	Thunderstruck	Chloe	Feature film
2005	Jewboy	Rivka	Feature film
2005	Hating Alison Ashley	Erica Yurken	Feature film
2005	The Glenmoore Job	Sally	
2007	The Jammed	Vanya	Feature film
2009	Kind of Man	Chloe	Short film
2009	Storage	Zia	Feature film
2010	Rampage		
2011	Cold Sore	Jenna	Short film
2012	Black & White & Sex	Angie 7	Feature film
2012	Min Min	Celeste	Short film

=== Television ===
Year	Title	Role	Notes
2000	Water Rats	Victoria St. Clair	TV series, episode: "Low Blows"
2003–04	Wicked Science	Dina Demiris	TV series
2005	Blue Heelers	Ashley Barker	TV series, episode: "Child's Play"
2007	Pirate Islands: The Lost Treasure of Fiji	Pirate Lily	TV series
2007–09	Sea Patrol	Lieutenant Nicole 'Nikki' (Nav) Caetano	TV series
2011	Rescue Special Ops	Annie Griffin	TV series, episode: "Storm Chaser"
2011	Home and Away	Tegan Callahan	TV series
2011	Underbelly: Razor	Ida Maddocks	TV miniseries, episode: "The Darlinghurst Outrage"
2012	Tricky Business	Zoe Platt	TV series, episode: "Space and Time"

== Theatre ==
Title
Blackrock
The Merchant of Venice
The Chapel Perilous

== Awards and nominations ==
Year	Nominated work	Award	Category	Result
2005	Hating Alison Ashley	AFI Awards	Best Actress in a Leading Role	Nominated
2006	Blue Heelers (episode 493)	AFI Awards	Best Guest or Supporting Actress in a Television Series	Won
2007	The Jammed	AFI Awards	AFI Award for Best Actress in a Supporting Role	Nominated
