= Chris Blake =

Welsh lawn bowler

Personal information
- Nationality: British (Welsh)
- Born: 26 August 1971 (age 54) Cardiff
- Occupation: Engineer
- Years active: 1987-2015
- Height: 5 ft (152 cm) 8"
- Weight: 78 kg (172 lb)

Sport
- Country: Wales
- Sport: Lawn Bowls
- Club: Cardiff BC, Barry Athletic BC
Medal record
Representing Wales
World Outdoor Championship
Silver medal – second place	1996 Adelaide	fours
British Isles Championships
Gold medal – first place	1995	triples

Chris Blake is a Welsh international lawn and indoor bowler.

== Bowls career ==
He won a silver medal in the fours at the 1996 World Outdoor Bowls Championship in Adelaide.

He won the 1994 triples title and 2001 pairs title at the Welsh National Bowls Championships when bowling for Cardiff Bowls Club. He subsequently became a British champion after winning the 1995 triples title at the British Isles Bowls Championships.
