= Nikolai Nikolaeff =

Australian actor

- Born: Melbourne, Victoria, Australia
- Occupation: Actor
- Years active: 1994–present

Nikolai Nikolaeff is an Australian actor who is best known for his roles in the television series Sea Patrol, Power Rangers Jungle Fury and Daredevil.

== Early life ==
Nikolaeff was born in Melbourne, Victoria, and is of Russian and Ukrainian descent. He began acting at the age of 12 and enrolled into the Victorian Youth Theatre. He attended school at Caulfield Grammar School, and at age 16 landed a lead role in Crash Zone, which led to a number of roles in other children's television series. He took an arts degree at Monash University Caulfield.

== Filmography ==
=== Films ===
Year	Film	Role	Notes
2003	Subterano	Todd	
2005	Stealth	Russian Fighter Pilot No. 2	
2006	Forged	Juda	Short film
2007	Valentine's Day	Jodie	
2009	Kin	Vlad	Supporting role
2018	Mile 22	Senior Lieutenant Aleksander Aslanov	
2019	Togo	Dan Murphy	
2023	Last Voyage of the Demeter	Petrofsky	

=== Television ===
Year	Television series	Role	Notes
1999–2001	Crash Zone	Mike Hansen	Main role, 26 episodes
1999–2004	Blue Heelers	Aiden Wiltshire/Stephen Chernov	2 episodes
1999	High Flyers	Nick	1 episode
2000	Round the Twist	Snorrison	2 episodes
2000	Pig's Breakfast	Nick	3 episodes
2000	Eugenie Sandler P.I.	Bogdan	1 episode
2003	The Saddle Club	Drew Regnery	19 episodes
2004	Stingers	Slug	1 episode
2005	Scooter: Secret Agent	Ed	1 episode
2005–2006	Wicked Science	Jack Bailey	Supporting role, 26 episodes
2006	Penicillin: The Magic Bullet	James	Television film
2008	Canal Road	Vladimir	2 episodes
2008	Mark Loves Sharon	Robbie Kane	1 episode
2008	Power Rangers Jungle Fury	Dominic/Rhino Ranger	14 episodes
2009	The Pacific	Rear Echelon Man	1 episode
2009–2011	Sea Patrol	Leo "2Dads" Kosov-Meyer	40 episodes
2013	Camp	David "Cole" Coleman	Main role, 10 episodes
2015	Daredevil	Vladimir	6 episodes
2016	The OA	Mr. Azarov	4 episodes
2017	Fargo	Drug Dealer	Episode: "The Law of Non-Contradiction"
2018	Six	Prince	9 episodes
2019	NCIS: New Orleans	Luca Osman	Episode: "The River Styx, Part I"
2020	NCIS	Xavier Zovotov	Episode: "On Fire"
2022	Stranger Things	Ivan	4 episodes

=== Video games ===
Year	Film/TV	Role	Notes
2021	Call of Duty: Vanguard	Private Desmond "Des" Wilmot	
2023	Call of Duty: Modern Warfare III	Andrei Nolan	
2025	Battlefield 6	Lucas Hemlock	
2026	Call of Duty: Modern Warfare IV	Andrei Nolan	

== See also ==
- List of Caulfield Grammar School people
