= Buffer (navy) =

Buffer is the colloquial title for the senior seaman sailor in a Commonwealth of Nations navy ship. The formal title is chief boatswain's mate.

This person is typically a chief petty officer or petty officer in frigates or destroyers, and in larger ships may be a warrant officer. In smaller ships, such as a patrol boat, the buffer may be a petty officer or leading rate.

The buffer reports to the first lieutenant or deck officer, and has a wide-ranging roving commission to supervise seamanship evolutions (activities) and issue directions to seamen as required, and advise "part of ship" officers and petty officers on their activities. As such, directions and orders come with the 'line' authority of the deck officer.

The buffer will supervise major ship activities, such as: berthing alongside and taking on equipment in harbour; anchoring, mooring and weighing; rigging for refuelling or stores transfer at sea; sending away and recovering a sea-boat.

The commanding officer may occasionally call for advice from the buffer with the deck officer and executive officer in attendance, so that there is wide agreement and understanding between the senior seamanship staff.

The equivalent position in the United States Navy would be that of a command master chief petty officer in the boatswain's mate rating.
