= Kristian Schmid =

Australian actor (born 1974)

- Born: 28 November 1974 (age 51); Geelong, Victoria, Australia
- Occupation: Actor
- Years active: 1987–present
- Spouse: Deborah Clay (2003–present)
- Children: 1
- Relatives: Karl Schmid (brother)

Kristian Schmid (born 28 November 1974) is an Australian actor best known for his roles as Todd Landers in Neighbours and Leading Seaman Robert Dixon in Sea Patrol.

== Early life ==
Schmid was born in Geelong, Australia to Hungarian parents. He is the cousin of Krista Vendy who was also a regular in Neighbours.

== Career ==
Schmid is best known for playing Todd Landers in the Australian soap opera Neighbours from 1988 until 1992. He then appeared as Adam Newman in the British children's science fiction television series The Tomorrow People from 1992-1995. While on a four-year work permit in the UK, he made appearances on several UK television shows, such as Noel’s House Party where he was voted into the gunge tank by the voting public, as well as the plays The Lion in Winter and Laura.

In 2002, Schmid played Brad the Goth in the film Scooby-Doo, and Danny in the Australian film Blurred, about Schoolies week.

He played a newspaper journalist in the Foxtel comedy Stupid Stupid Man and has appeared on several Australian television dramas including Blue Heelers and All Saints.

From 2007, he played Leading Seaman Robert Dixon on the prime time Nine Network drama, Sea Patrol, starring in all five seasons of the show. From 2009, he also had a recurring role on Packed to the Rafters as Alex Barton, a character who had cerebral palsy.

He has performed in two versions of the play Two Weeks with the Queen by Morris Gleitzman. The first time was for the BBC in London and the second was for the Windmill Theatre Company in 2006. He has performed in three versions of Shakespeare's A Midsummer Night's Dream and numerous pantomimes in the UK with Richard Cheshire.

Schmid also appeared on the Nine Network show 20 to 1, hosted by Bert Newton.

From 2016 to 2017, Schmid portrayed Mick Jennings on Home and Away.

== Filmography ==
=== Film ===
| Year | Title | Role | Notes |
|---|---|---|---|
| 2002 | Scooby-Doo | Brad | |
| 2002 | Blurred | Danny | |
| 2005 | The Great Raid | Corporal Lee | |
| 2006 | Glitch | Elliot | Short film |
| 2006 | Shuffle | Flanagan | Short film |
| 2006 | Voodoo Lagoon | Kevin | |
| 2010 | Santa's Apprentice | Felix's Father (voice) | |

=== Television ===
| Year | Title | Role | Notes |
|---|---|---|---|
| 1988–92 | Neighbours | Todd Landers | TV series, 437 episodes |
| 1992–95 | The Tomorrow People | Adam Newman | TV series |
| 1995 | Blue Heelers | Aaron Landers | TV series, episodes: "Double Jeopardy: Parts 1 & 2" |
| 1996 | English: Have a Go | Andy Jones | TV series |
| 1998 | Good Guys, Bad Guys | Jimmy Costello | TV series, episode: "A Chip Off the Old Potato" |
| 1999 | All Saints | Thomas Ferry | TV series, episodes: "In with the New", "Second Chance" |
| 2000 | The Lost World | Thane | Miniseries, episode: "Barbarians at the Gate" |
| 2001 | BeastMaster | Karpen | TV series, episode: "Golgotha" |
| 2005 | Hercules | King Eurystheus | Miniseries |
| 2006 | Nightmares & Dreamscapes: From the Stories of Stephen King | Buddy Holly | TV series, episode: "You Know They Got a Hell of a Band" |
| 2006 | Stupid, Stupid Man | Adam Lilycrap | TV series, episode: "Integrity" |
| 2007–11 | Sea Patrol | Robert 'RO' Dixon | TV series |
| 2009–13 | Packed to the Rafters | Alex Barton | TV series, seasons 2–5 |
| 2015 | Plonk | Tristan Keen | TV series, episode: "McLaren Vale" |
| 2016 | Brock | Evan Green | Miniseries, episode: "1.1" |
| 2016–17 | Home and Away | Mick Jennings | TV series |
| 2023 | North Shore | Hamish | TV series, 5 episodes |
