= Matt Holmes (actor) =

Australian actor (born 1976)

Matthew Holmes
- Born: 17 July 1976 (age 50); Albury, New South Wales, Australia
- Education: Newington College; Actors College of Theatre and Television
- Occupation: Actor

Matthew Holmes (born 17 July 1976 in Albury, New South Wales, Australia) is an Australian actor.

== Education ==
Holmes attended Newington College (1981–1993). He gained an Advanced Diploma in Acting at the Actors College of Theatre and Television.

== Career ==
Holmes played one of the main characters in Sea Patrol's 2007–2011 seasons – Petty Officer Chris Blake, the Coxswain of a fictional Royal Australian Navy Patrol Boat. He made his first appearance in the first season (2007), and remained on the show until its series end. He appeared in sixty-eight episodes, with the finale being broadcast in June 2011.

He appeared as Constable Matthew "Matt" Graham on the Seven Network Australian police drama series Blue Heelers.

Holmes is also recognised for appearing in two television ads – one for the website seek.com.au and the other for the Victoria and Queensland Government's Drink-Driving campaign. He also appears in the "Working Like a Machine?" Kit Kat ad.

== Filmography ==
=== Film ===
Year	Title	Role	Notes
2012	Black & White & Sex	The Interviewer	Feature film
2014	Alien Outpost	North	Feature film

=== Television ===
Year	Title	Role	Notes	Ref
2005	All Saints	Peter	1 episode	
2005	BlackJack: In the Money	Derek Chubb	TV movie	
2005	BlackJack: Ace Point Game	Derek Chubb	TV movie	
2005–06	Blue Heelers	Constable Matt Graham	21 episodes	
2008	Out of the Blue	Senior Constable Sam Webster	16 episodes	
2007-11	Sea Patrol	Chris 'Swain' Blake, CV	68 episodes	
2010	Cops L.A.C.	Ian Lothar	1 episode	
2013	Castle	Chase Diggins	1 episode	
2013	Perception	Phil Carlson	1 episode	
2013	CSI: Crime Scene Investigation	Curtis LeBlanc	1 episode	
2014	Killer Women	Augie Travis	1 episode	
2014	Salem	William Hooke	2 episodes	
2014	True Blood	Charles Dupont	2 episodes	
2015	Hollywood Hitman	Dave	2 episodes	
2015	Bones	Alex	2 episodes	
2016	NCIS	Griffin	1 episode	
2018	Pine Gap	PM Philip Burke	2 episodes	
2023	NCIS: Sydney	FBI Special Agent Cummins	1 episode	
2024	Home and Away	Carl Hayes	6 episodes	
