= Did Marco Polo Go to China? =

1995 book by Frances Wood

- First UK hardcover edition, 1995
- Author: Frances Wood
- Language: English
- Subject: History
- Published: 1995
- Publication place: United States
- Media type: Print
- ISBN: 978-0-8133-8999-8

Did Marco Polo Go to China? is a 1995 book by Frances Wood, arguing that the Venetian merchant Marco Polo never visited China but travelled no further than Persia and that he based his description of China on accounts from Persian travelers.

Wood notes that Polo failed to mention the Great Wall, the use of chopsticks as eating utensils, tea, foot-binding, Chinese calligraphy or other significant features and that there are no Chinese records of Polo's presence. Some archeologists have pointed to inconsistencies and inaccuracies in his description of Kublai Khan's attempted invasions of Japan in 1274 and 1281 and that Polo's account mixed up details from the two invasions.

The response from scholars in the field has been largely negative. They say Wood's argument is an example of an argument from silence and that he included accurate information on other topics that he could only have gathered from observation.

== Criticisms ==
Scholars in the field responded to defend the view that Polo was in China. Igor de Rachewiltz (translator and annotator of The Secret History of the Mongols) reviewed the field and concludes: "I regret to say that F. W.'s book falls short of the standard of scholarship that one would expect in a work of this kind. Her book can only be described as deceptive, both in relation to the author and to the public at large. Questions are posted that, in the majority of cases, have already been answered satisfactorily ... her attempt is unprofessional; she is poorly equipped in the basic tools of the trade, i.e., adequate linguistic competence and research methodology ... and her major arguments cannot withstand close scrutiny. Her conclusion fails to consider all the evidence supporting Marco Polo's credibility."

Morris Rossabi, author of Kublai Khan: His Life and Times, writes that Polo's "descriptions of the postal system, Beijing, Hangzhou, Ahmad's career and death, Khubilai's personality, Shangdu, feasts, and banquets reveal tremendous first-hand knowledge of the Mongol court and its policies and tally with Chinese and Persian primary sources." The historian David Morgan points out basic errors such as confusing the Liao dynasty with the Jin dynasty and found no compelling evidence in the book that would convince him that Marco Polo did not go to China.

Several others have also pointed to errors. For example, Stephen G. Haw notes how Wood claims that the History of Yuan mentions Giovanni de Marignolli by name even though it mentions only the tributary gift that he brought to the Yuan court, a large impressive war horse given by the "Franks" (Fulang) of Europe. Haw also argues that Marco's account is much more correct and accurate than has often been supposed and that it is extremely unlikely that he could have obtained all the information in his book from second-hand sources. Haw also criticizes Wood for searching for "Marco Polo" in Chinese texts; Europeans at the time had little regard for surnames and that a direct Chinese transliteration of the name "Marco" ignores the possibility of him taking on a Chinese or even Mongol name with no similarity to his Latin name. Peter Jackson (author of The Mongols and the West) wrote that Haw "must surely now have settled the controversy surrounding the historicity of Polo's visit to China".
