= Frances Wood =

English librarian, sinologue and historian

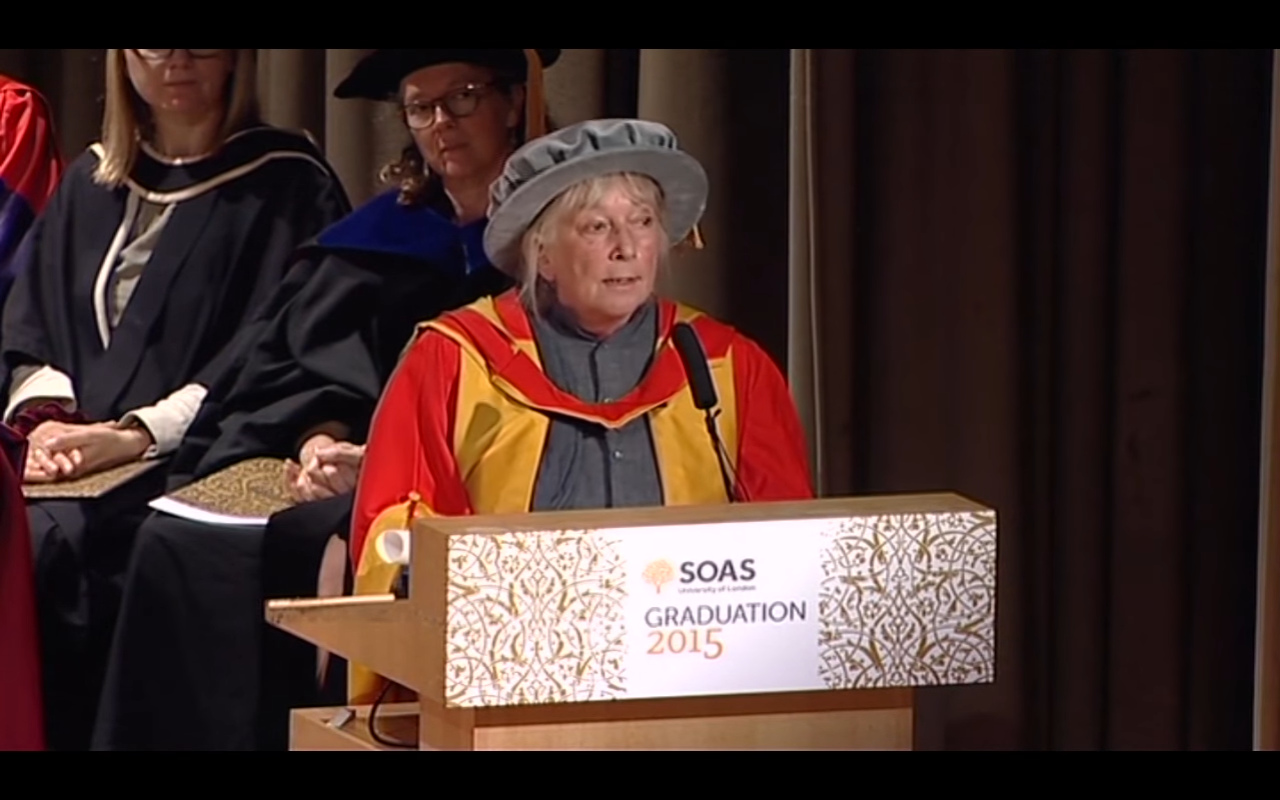
- Wood being honoured in 2015 at the graduation ceremony of SOAS
- Born: 1948 (age 77–78); London, United Kingdom
- Occupation: Librarian

Academic background
- Education: Newnham College, Cambridge (PhD)
- Thesis: Domestic Architecture in the Beijing Area, 1860–1930 (1983)

Academic work
- Discipline: Historian
- Sub-discipline: Chinese history
- Institutions: SOAS University of London; British Library

Frances Wood's voice
from the BBC programme In Our Time, 24 May 2012.

Frances Wood (Chinese: 吴芳思; pinyin: Wú Fāngsī; born 1948) is an English librarian, sinologue and historian known for her writings on Chinese history, including Marco Polo, life in the Chinese treaty ports, and the First Emperor of China.

== Biography ==
Wood was born in London in 1948, and went to art school in Liverpool in 1967, before going to Newnham College, Cambridge, where she studied Chinese. She went to China to study Chinese at Peking University in 1975–1976.

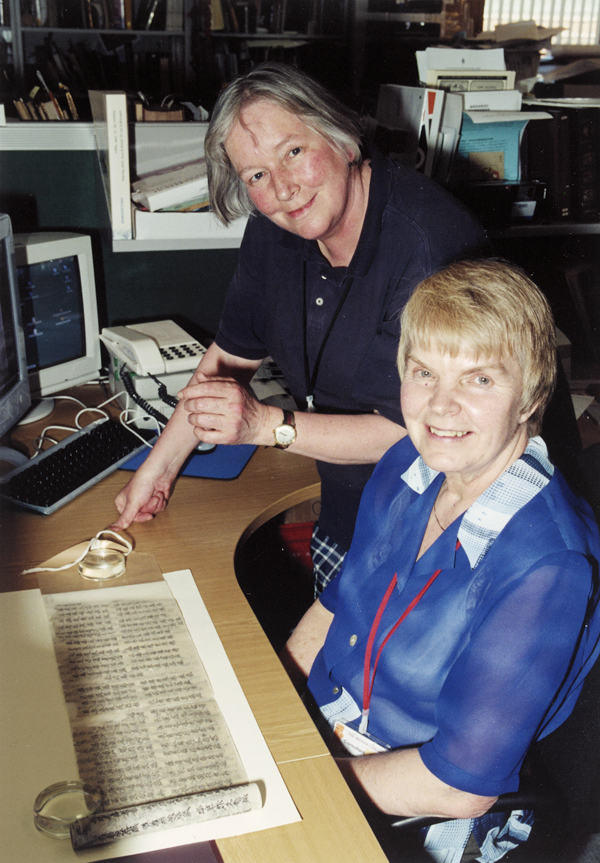
Frances Wood (standing) with Russian Tangutologist Ksenia Kepping in March 2001

Wood joined the staff of the British Library in London in 1977 as a junior curator, and later served as curator of Chinese collections until her retirement in 2013. She is also a member of the steering committee of the International Dunhuang Project, and the editor of the Transactions of the Oriental Ceramic Society. She was also a governor of Ashmount Primary School for 20 years, relinquishing this post on the completion of her current term of office in July 2014.

She has argued in her 1995 book, Did Marco Polo go to China?, that the book of Marco Polo (Il Milione) is not the account of a single person, but is a collection of travellers' tales. This book's claims about Polo's travels has been heavily criticized by Stephen G. Haw, David O. Morgan and Peter Jackson as lacking basic academic rigor.

In May 2012, she appeared on In Our Time on BBC Radio 4, talking about Marco Polo; she appeared again in the 2015 episode on Chinese legalism. In December 2012 she appeared on the Christmas University Challenge special as a member of the Newnham College, Cambridge team.

== Bibliography ==
- 1985 Chinese illustration. British Library. ISBN 978-0-7123-0053-7
- 1991 (with Norah M. Titley). Oriental Gardens. British Library. ISBN 978-0-7123-0239-5
- 1995 Did Marco Polo go to China?. Secker & Warburg. ISBN 978-0-436-20384-8
- 1998 No Dogs and Not Many Chinese: Treaty Port Life in China, 1843-1943. John Murray. ISBN 978-0-7195-6400-0
- 2000 Hand-grenade practice in Peking: my part in the Cultural Revolution. John Murray. ISBN 978-0-7195-5781-1
- 2002 The Silk Road: Two Thousand Years in the Heart of Asia. University of California Press. ISBN 978-0-520-23786-5
- 2005 The Forbidden City. British Museum Press. ISBN 978-0-7141-2789-7
- 2007 The First Emperor of China. Profile Books. ISBN 978-1-84668-032-8
- 2008 China's First Emperor and His Terracotta Warriors. St. Martin's Press. ISBN 978-0-312-38112-7
- 2009 The Lure of China: Writers from Marco Polo to J. G. Ballard. Yale University Press. ISBN 978-0-300-15436-8
- 2010 (with Mark Barnard). The Diamond Sutra: The Story of the World's Earliest Dated Printed Book. British Library. ISBN 978-0-7123-5090-7
- 2017 Great Books of China. Head of Zeus. ISBN 9781786694515
