= Marco Polo =

Venetian merchant, explorer, and writer (1254–1324)

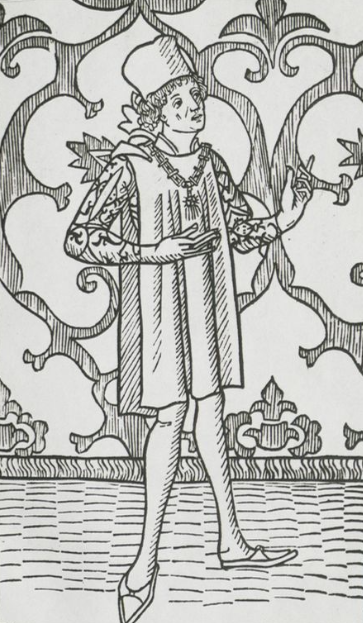
- Earliest surviving portrait, 1477
- Born: c. 1254; Venice (present-day Italy)
- Died: 8 January 1324 (aged 69–70); Venice
- Resting place: Church of San Lorenzo
- Occupations: Merchant; explorer; writer
- Known for: The Travels of Marco Polo
- Spouse: Donata Badoer (m. 1300)
- Children: 4, including Fantina
- Father: Niccolò Polo

Marco Polo (Note: /ˈmɑːrkoʊ ˈpoʊloʊ/; Venetian: [ˈmaɾko ˈpolo]; Italian: [ˈmarko ˈpɔːlo]) (c. 1254 – 8 January 1324) was a Venetian merchant, explorer, and writer who travelled through Asia along the Silk Road between 1271 and 1295. His travels are recorded in The Travels of Marco Polo (also known as Book of the Marvels of the World and Il Milione, c. 1300), a book that described the then-mysterious culture and inner workings of the Eastern world, including the wealth and great size of the Mongol Empire and China under the Yuan dynasty, giving Europeans their first comprehensive look into China, Persia, India, Japan, and other Asian societies.

Born in Venice, Marco learned the mercantile trade from his father and his uncle, Niccolò and Maffeo, who travelled through Asia and met Kublai Khan. In 1269, they returned to Venice to meet Marco for the first time. The three of them embarked on an epic journey to Asia, exploring many places along the Silk Road until they reached "Cathay". They were received by the royal court of Kublai Khan, who was impressed by Marco's intelligence and humility. Marco was appointed to serve as Kublai's foreign emissary, and he was sent on many diplomatic missions throughout the empire and Southeast Asia, visiting present-day Myanmar, India, Indonesia, Sri Lanka, and Vietnam. As part of this appointment, Marco also travelled extensively inside China, living in the emperor's lands for 17 years and seeing many things previously unknown to Europeans.

Around 1291, the Polos offered to accompany the Mongol princess Kököchin to Persia; they arrived there around 1293. After leaving the princess, they travelled overland to Constantinople and then to Venice, returning home after 24 years. At this time, Venice was at war with Genoa. Marco joined the war effort on behalf of Venice and was captured by the Genoese. While imprisoned, he dictated stories of his travels to Rustichello da Pisa, a cellmate. He was released in 1299, became a wealthy merchant, married, and had three children. He died in 1324 and was buried in the church of San Lorenzo in Venice.

Though he was not the first European to reach China, Marco Polo was the first to leave a detailed chronicle of his experience. His account provided the Europeans with a clear picture of the East's geography and ethnic customs, and it included the first Western record of porcelain, gunpowder, paper money, and some Asian plants and exotic animals. His narrative inspired Christopher Columbus and many other travellers. There is substantial literature based on Polo's writings; he also influenced European cartography, leading to the introduction of the Catalan Atlas and the Fra Mauro map.

== Life ==
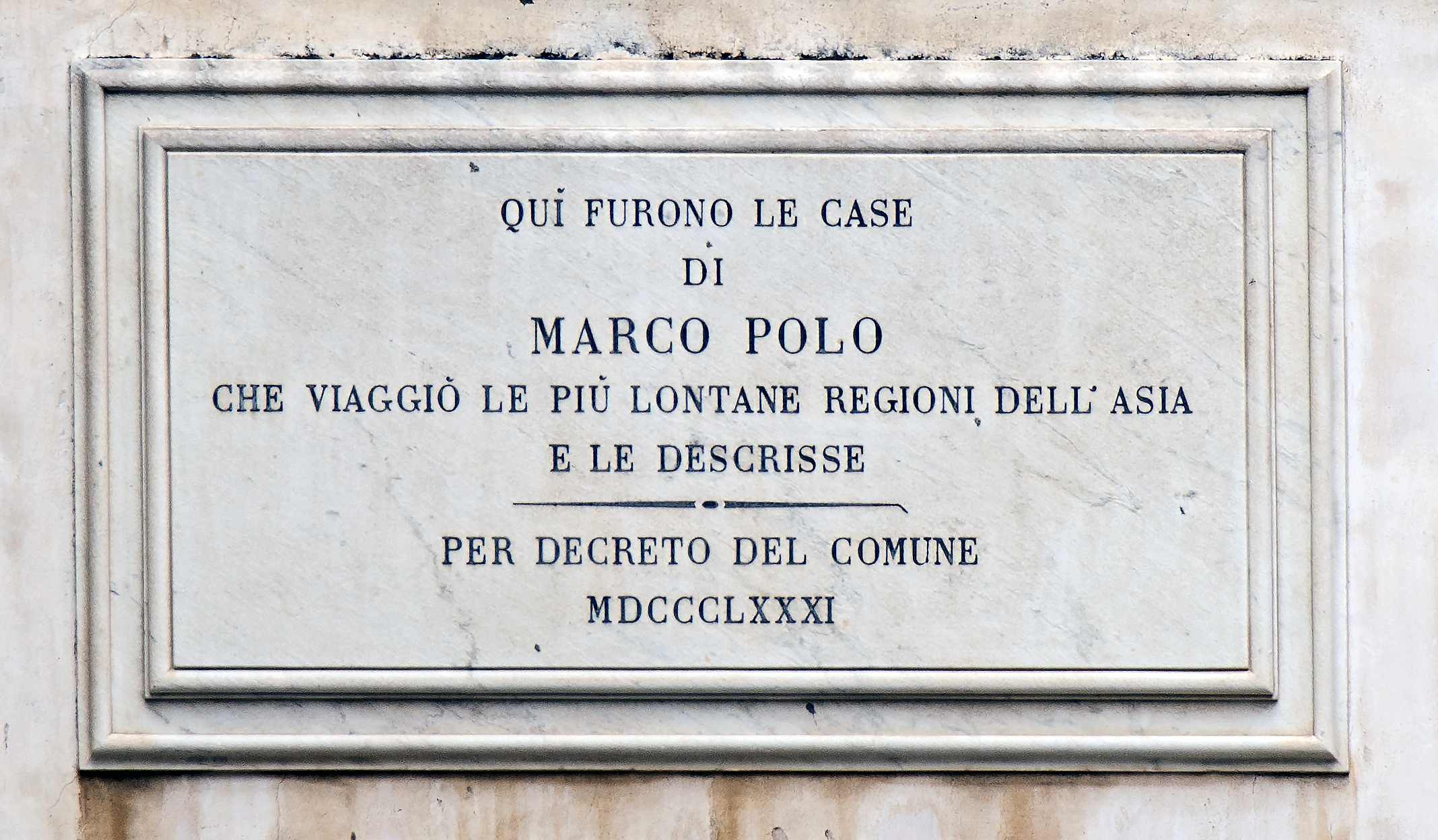
A commemorative plaque on the site of Casa Polo in Venice, part of the Teatro Malibran which was built upon Polo's house

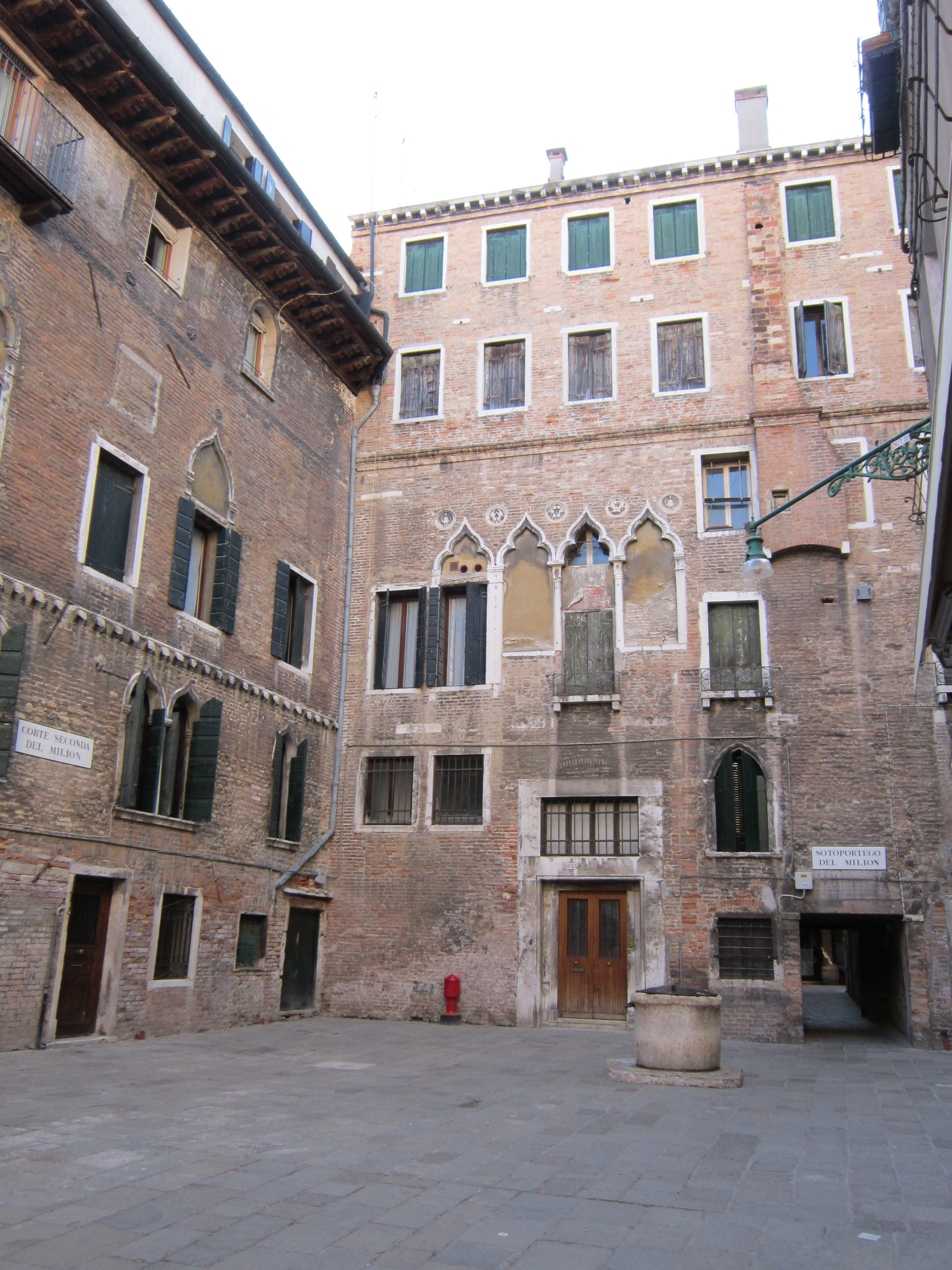
Corte Seconda del Milion, Venice, next to Polo's house, is named after the nickname of Polo, Il Milione

=== Family origin ===
Marco Polo was born around 1254 in Venice, but the exact date and place of birth are archivally unknown. The Travels of Marco Polo contains some basic information concerning Marco Polo's Venetian family and his birth in Venice; the book states that Marco's father, the travelling merchant Niccolò Polo, returned to visit his family in his hometown of Venice around 1269 and there found out that his wife, whom he had left pregnant, had died and left a 15-year-old son named Marco.

In contrast to the general consensus, there are theories suggesting that Marco Polo's birthplace was the island of Korčula or Constantinople but such hypotheses failed to gain acceptance among most scholars and have been countered by other studies.

=== Nickname Milione ===
He was nicknamed Milione during his lifetime (which in Italian literally means 'Million'). The Italian title of his book was Il Libro di Marco Polo soprannominato Milione, which means "The Book of Marco Polo, nicknamed 'Milione'". According to the 15th-century humanist Giovanni Battista Ramusio, his fellow citizens awarded him this nickname when he came back to Venice because he kept on saying that Kublai Khan's wealth was counted in millions. More precisely, he was nicknamed Messer Marco Milioni (Mr Marco Millions).

However, since his father Niccolò was also nicknamed Milione, 19th-century philologist Luigi Foscolo Benedetto was persuaded that Milione was a shortened version of Emilione, and that this nickname was used to distinguish Niccolò's and Marco's branch from other Polo families.

=== Early life and Asian travel ===
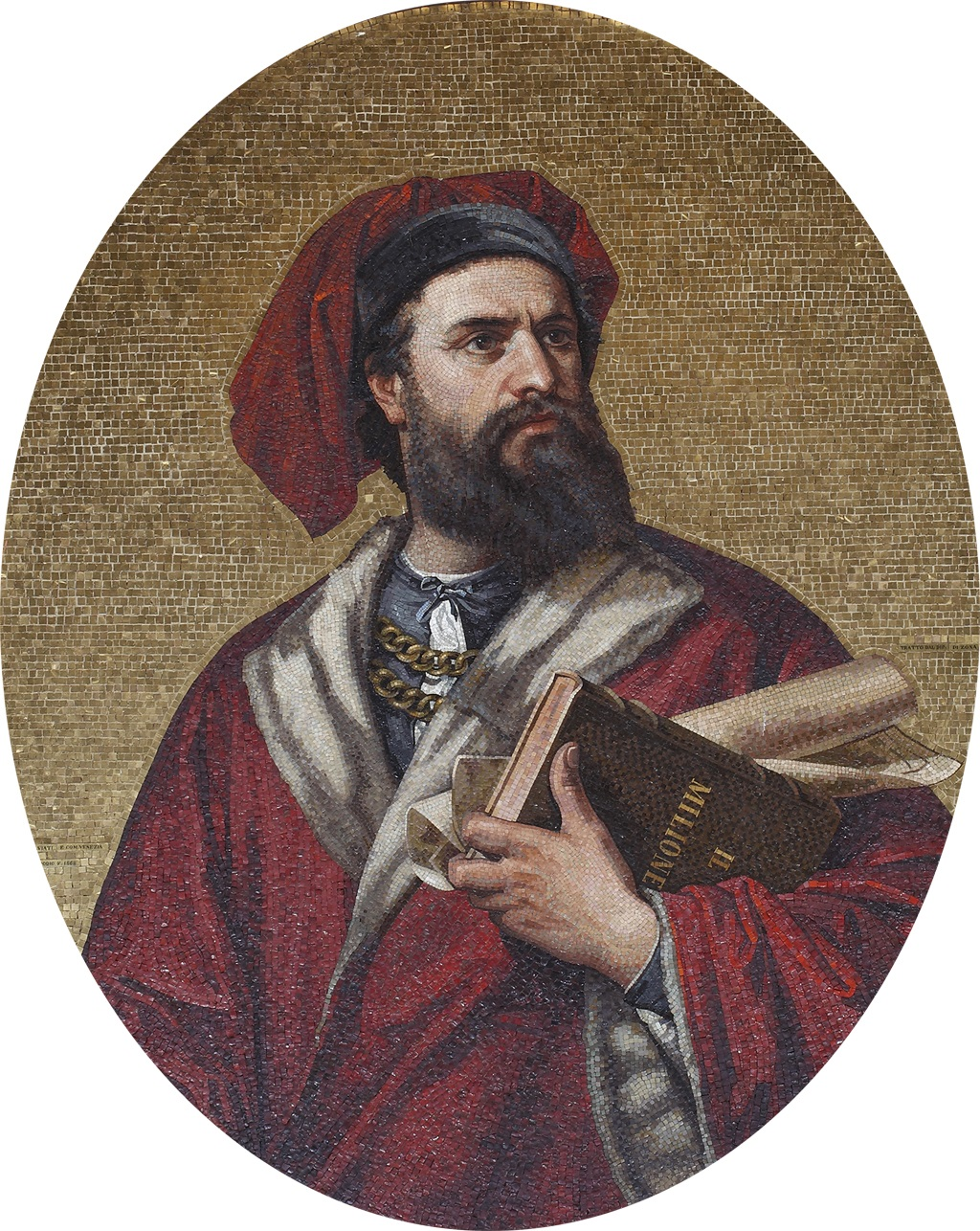
A mosaic of Marco Polo displayed in the Palazzo Doria-Tursi, Genoa, Italy

His father, Niccolò Polo, a merchant, traded with the Near East, becoming wealthy and achieving great prestige. Niccolò and his brother Maffeo set off on a trading voyage before Marco's birth. In 1260, Niccolò and Maffeo, while residing in Constantinople, then the capital of the Latin Empire, foresaw a political change; they liquidated their assets into jewels and moved away. According to The Travels of Marco Polo, they passed through much of Asia, and met with Kublai Khan, a Mongol ruler and founder of the Yuan dynasty.

Almost nothing is known about the childhood of Marco Polo until he was fifteen years old, except that he probably spent part of his childhood in Venice. Meanwhile, Marco Polo's mother died, and an aunt and uncle raised him. He received a good education, learning mercantile subjects including foreign currency, appraising, and the handling of cargo ships; he learned little or no Latin. His father later married Floradise Polo (née Trevisan).

In 1269, Niccolò and Maffeo returned to their families in Venice, meeting young Marco for the first time. In 1271, during the rule of Doge Lorenzo Tiepolo, Marco Polo (at seventeen years of age), his father, and his uncle set off for Asia on the series of adventures that Marco later documented in his book.

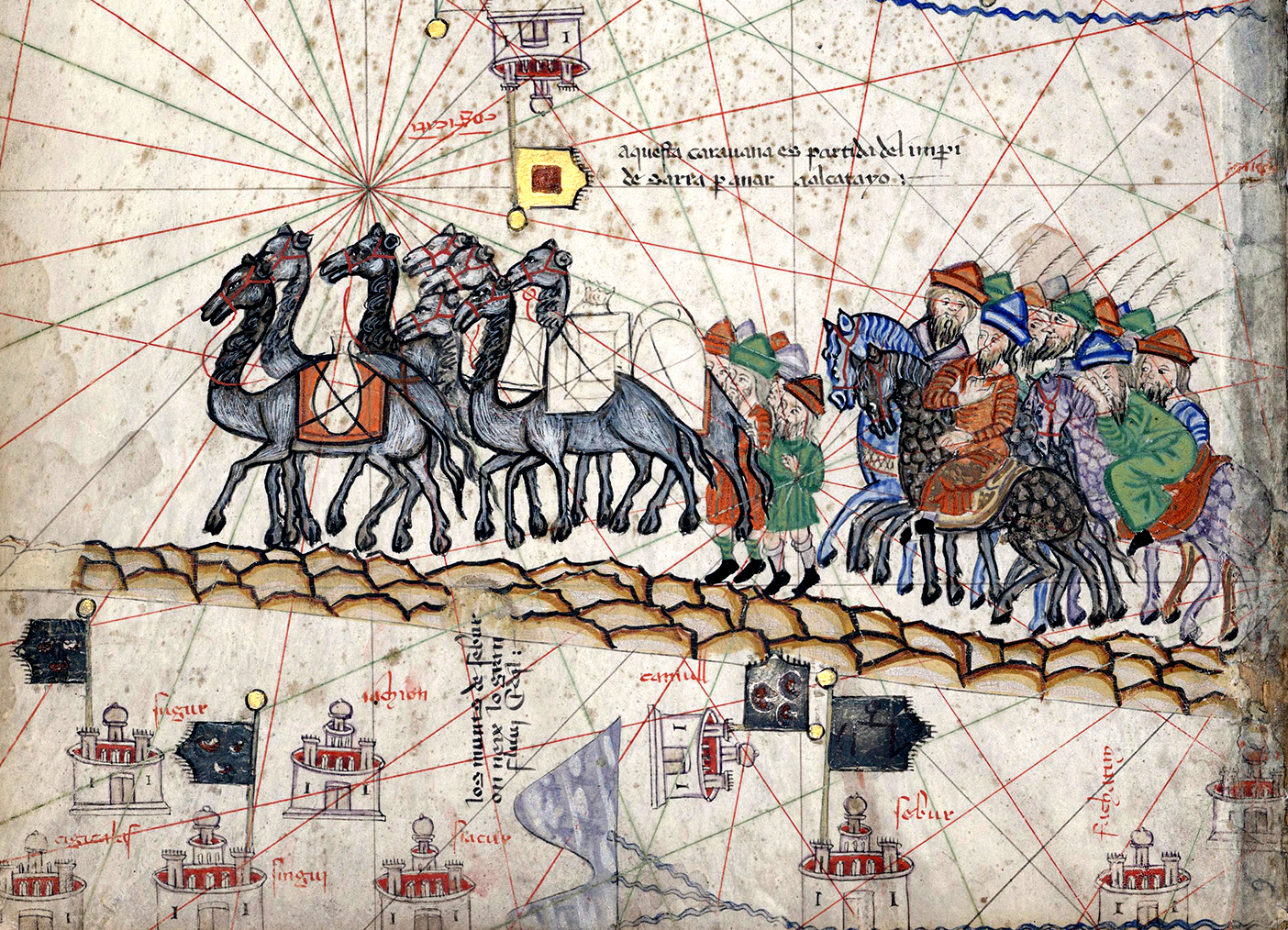
A close-up of the Catalan Atlas depicting Marco Polo travelling to the East during the Pax Mongolica

They sailed to Acre and later rode on their camels to the Persian port Hormuz. During the first stages of the journey, they stayed for a few months in Acre and were able to speak with Archdeacon Tedaldo Visconti of Piacenza. The Polo family, on that occasion, had expressed their regret at the long lack of a pope, because on their previous trip to China they had received a letter from Kublai Khan to the Pope, and had thus had to leave for China disappointed.

During the trip, they received news that after 33 months of vacation, the Conclave had elected the new Pope and that he was exactly the archdeacon of Acre. The three of them hurried to return to the Holy Land, where the new Pope entrusted them with letters for the "Great Khan", inviting him to send his emissaries to Rome. To give more weight to this mission, he sent with the Polos, as his legates, two Dominican fathers, Guglielmo of Tripoli and Nicola of Piacenza.

They continued overland until they arrived at Kublai Khan's palace in Shangdu, China, then known as Cathay. By this time, Marco was 21 years old. Impressed by Marco's intelligence and humility, Kublai appointed him to serve as his foreign emissary to India and Myanmar. He was sent on many diplomatic missions throughout his empire and in Southeast Asia, such as in present-day Indonesia, Sri Lanka and Vietnam, and entertained the Khan with stories and observations about the lands he saw. As part of this appointment, Marco travelled extensively inside China, living in the emperor's lands for 17 years.

Kublai initially refused several times to let the Polos return to Europe, as he appreciated their company and they became useful to him. Around 1291, he granted permission, entrusting the Polos with his last duty: accompany the Mongol princess Kököchin, who was to become the consort of Arghun Khan, in Persia. When the Polos arrived to Persia, they learned that Arghun Khan died, and Kököchin eventually became a wife of his son Ghazan. After leaving the princess, the Polos travelled overland to Constantinople. They later decided to return to their home.

They returned to Venice in 1295, after 24 years, with many riches and treasures. They had travelled almost 15,000 miles (24,000 km).

=== Genoese captivity and later life ===
Marco Polo returned to Venice in 1295 with his fortune converted into gemstones. At this time, Venice was at war with the Republic of Genoa. Polo armed a galley equipped with a trebuchet to join the war. He was probably caught by Genoese in a skirmish in 1296, off the Anatolian coast between Adana and the Gulf of Alexandretta (and not during the Battle of Curzola (September 1298), off the Dalmatian coast, a claim which is due to a later tradition (16th century) recorded by Giovanni Battista Ramusio).

He spent several months of his imprisonment dictating a detailed account of his travels to a fellow inmate, Rustichello da Pisa, who incorporated tales of his own as well as other collected anecdotes and current affairs from China. The book soon spread throughout Europe in manuscript form, and became known as The Travels of Marco Polo (Italian title: Il Milione, lit. "The Million", deriving from Polo's nickname "Milione". Original title in Franco-Italian: Livres des Merveilles du Monde). It depicts the Polos' journeys throughout Asia, giving Europeans their first comprehensive look into the inner workings of the Far East, including China, India, and Japan.

Polo was finally released from captivity in August 1299, and returned home to Venice, where his father and uncle in the meantime had purchased a large palazzo in the zone named contrada San Giovanni Crisostomo (Corte del Milion). For such a venture, the Polo family probably invested profits from trading, and even many gemstones they brought from the East. The company continued its activities and Marco soon became a wealthy merchant. Marco and his uncle Maffeo financed other expeditions, but likely never left Venetian provinces, nor returned to the Silk Road and Asia. Sometime before 1300, his father Niccolò died. In 1300, he married Donata Badoèr, the daughter of Vitale Badoèr, a merchant. They had three daughters, Fantina (married Marco Bragadin), Bellela (married Bertuccio Querini), and Moreta. In 2022, it was found that Polo first had a daughter named Agnese (b. 1295/1299 – d. 1319) from a partnership or marriage which ended before 1300.

Pietro d'Abano, a philosopher, doctor and astrologer based in Padua, reports having spoken with Marco Polo about what he had observed in the vault of the sky during his travels. Marco told him that during his return trip to the South China Sea, he had spotted what he describes in a drawing as a star "shaped like a sack" (in Latin: ut sacco) with a big tail (magna habens caudam); most likely a comet. Astronomers agree that there were no comets sighted in Europe at the end of the 13th century, but there are records about a comet sighted in China and Indonesia in 1293. This circumstance does not appear in Polo's book of travels. Peter D'Abano kept the drawing in his volume Conciliator Differentiarum, quæ inter Philosophos et Medicos Versantur. Marco Polo gave Pietro other astronomical observations he made in the Southern Hemisphere, and also a description of the Sumatran rhinoceros, which are collected in the Conciliator.

In 1305, he is mentioned in a Venetian document among local sea captains regarding the payment of taxes. His relation with a certain Marco Polo, who in 1300 was mentioned in relation to riots against the aristocratic government, and who escaped the death penalty, who was also mentioned in relation to riots from 1310 led by Bajamonte Tiepolo and Marco Querini, among whose rebels were Jacobello and Francesco Polo from another family branch, is unclear. Polo is clearly mentioned again after 1305 in Maffeo's testament from 1309 to 1310, in a 1319 document according to which he became owner of some estates of his deceased father, and in 1321, when he bought part of the family property of his wife Donata.

=== Death ===
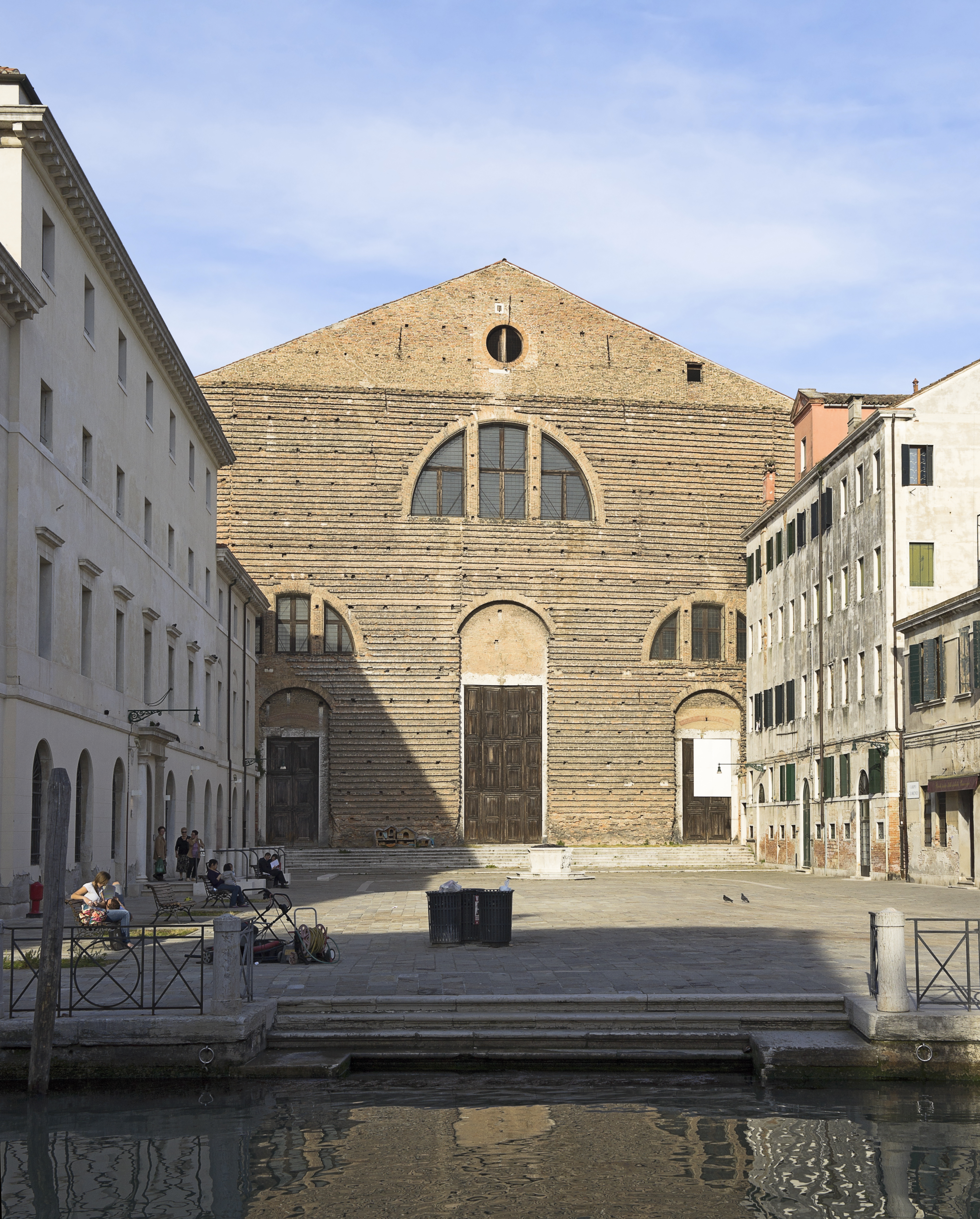
San Lorenzo church in the sestiere of Castello (Venice), where Polo was buried. The photo shows the church as it is today, after the 1592 rebuilding.

In 1323, Polo was confined to bed due to illness. On 8 January 1324, despite physicians' efforts to treat him, Polo was on his deathbed. To write and certify the will, his family requested Giovanni Giustiniani, a priest of San Procolo. His wife, Donata, and his three daughters were appointed by him as co-executrices. The Church was entitled by law to a portion of his estate; he approved of this and ordered that a further sum be paid to the convent of San Lorenzo, the place where he wished to be buried. He also set free Peter, a Tartar servant, who may have accompanied him from Asia, and to whom Polo bequeathed 100 lire of Venetian denari.

He divided up the rest of his assets, including several properties, among individuals, religious institutions, and every guild and fraternity to which he belonged. He also wrote off multiple debts, including 300 lire that his sister-in-law owed him, and others for the convent of San Giovanni, San Paolo of the Order of Preachers, and a cleric named Friar Benvenuto. He ordered 220 soldi be paid to Giovanni Giustiniani for his work as a notary and his prayers.

The will was not signed by Polo, but it was validated by the then-relevant "signum manus" rule, by which the testator had only to touch the document to make it legally valid. Due to the Venetian law stating that the day ends at sunset, the exact date of Marco Polo's death cannot be determined, but according to some scholars it was between the sunsets of 8 and 9 January 1324. Biblioteca Marciana, which holds the original copy of his testament, dates the testament on 9 January 1324, and it gives the date of his death at some time in June 1324.

== The Travels of Marco Polo ==
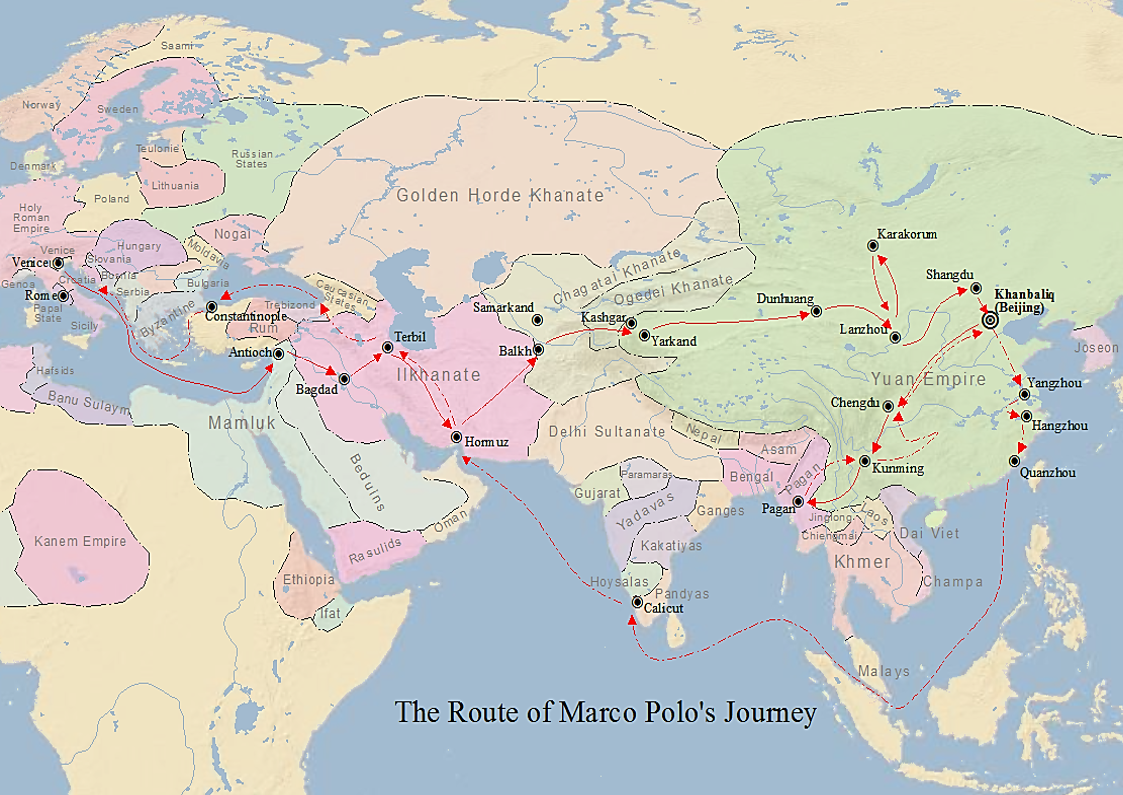
Map of Marco Polo's travels

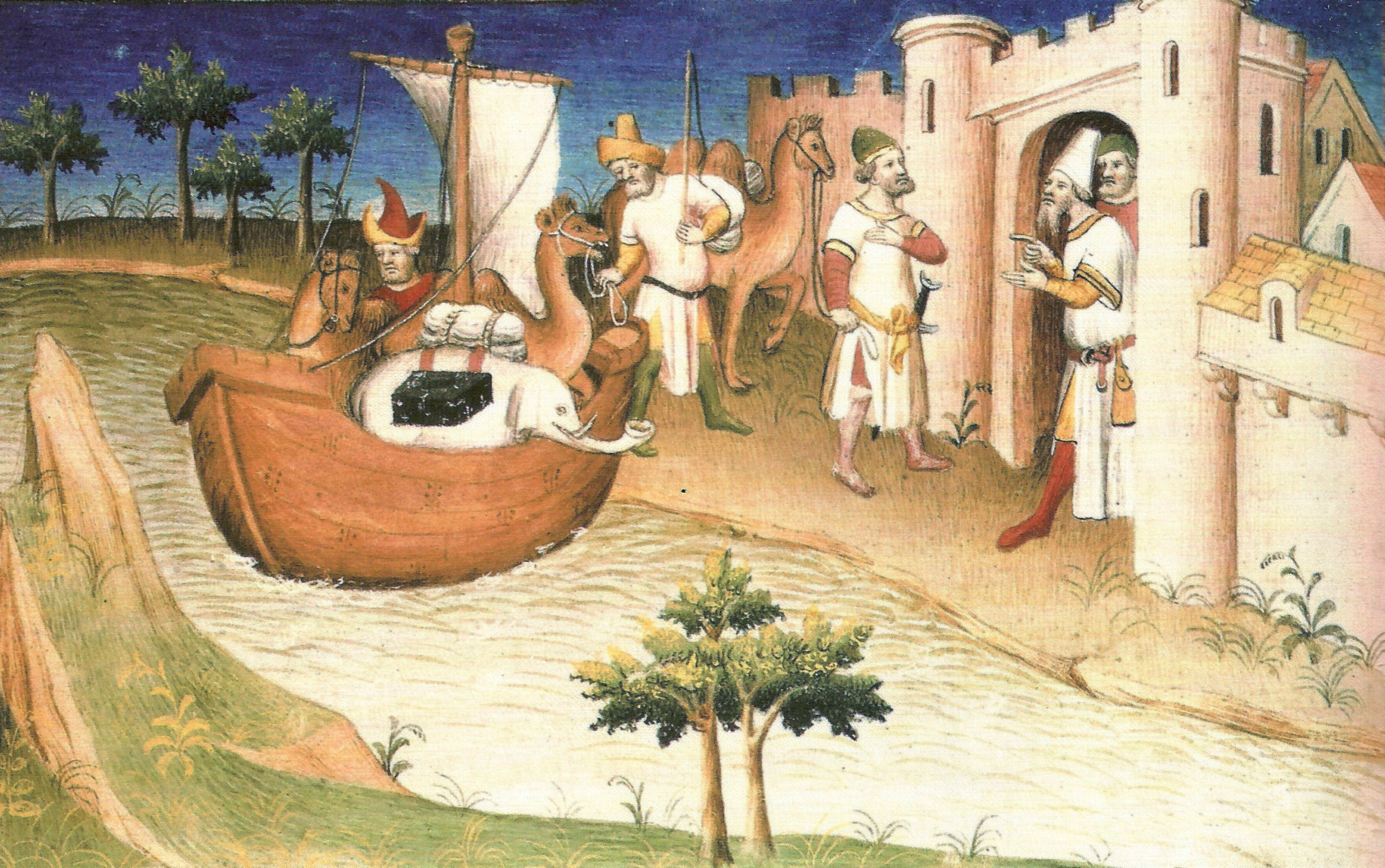
A miniature from Il Milione

An authoritative version of Marco Polo's book does not and cannot exist, for the early manuscripts differ significantly, and the reconstruction of the original text is a matter of textual criticism. A total of about 150 copies in various languages are known to exist. Before the availability of printing press, errors were frequently made during copying and translating, so there are many differences between the various copies.

Polo related his memoirs orally to Rustichello da Pisa while both were prisoners of the Genova Republic. Rustichello wrote Devisement du Monde in Franco-Venetian. The idea probably was to create a handbook for merchants, essentially a text on weights, measures and distances.

The oldest surviving manuscript is in Old French heavily flavoured with Italian; According to the Italian scholar Luigi Foscolo Benedetto, this "F" text is the basic original text, which he corrected by comparing it with the somewhat more detailed Italian of Giovanni Battista Ramusio, together with a Latin manuscript in the Biblioteca Ambrosiana. Other early important sources are "R" (Ramusio's Italian translation first printed in 1559), and "Z" (a 15th-century Latin manuscript kept at Toledo, Spain). Another Old French Polo manuscript, dating to around 1350, is held by the National Library of Sweden.

One of the early manuscripts Iter Marci Pauli Veneti was a translation into Latin made by the Dominican brother Francesco Pipino in 1302, just a few years after Marco's return to Venice. Since Latin was then the most widespread and authoritative language of culture, it is suggested that Rustichello's text was translated into Latin for a precise will of the Dominican Order, and this helped to promote the book on a European scale.

The first English translation is the Elizabethan version by John Frampton published in 1579, The Most Noble and Famous Travels of Marco Polo, based on Santaella's Castilian translation of 1503 (the first version in that language).

The published editions of Polo's book rely on single manuscripts, blend multiple versions together, or add notes to clarify, for example in the English translation by Henry Yule. The 1938 English translation by A. C. Moule and Paul Pelliot is based on a Latin manuscript found in the library of the Cathedral of Toledo in 1932, and is 50% longer than other versions. The popular translation published by Penguin Books in 1958 by R. E. Latham works several texts together to make a readable whole. Sharon Kinoshita's 2016 version takes as its source the Franco-Italian "F" manuscript, and invites readers to "focus on the text as the product of a larger European (and Eurasian) literary and commercial culture", rather than questions of veracity of the account.

=== Narrative ===
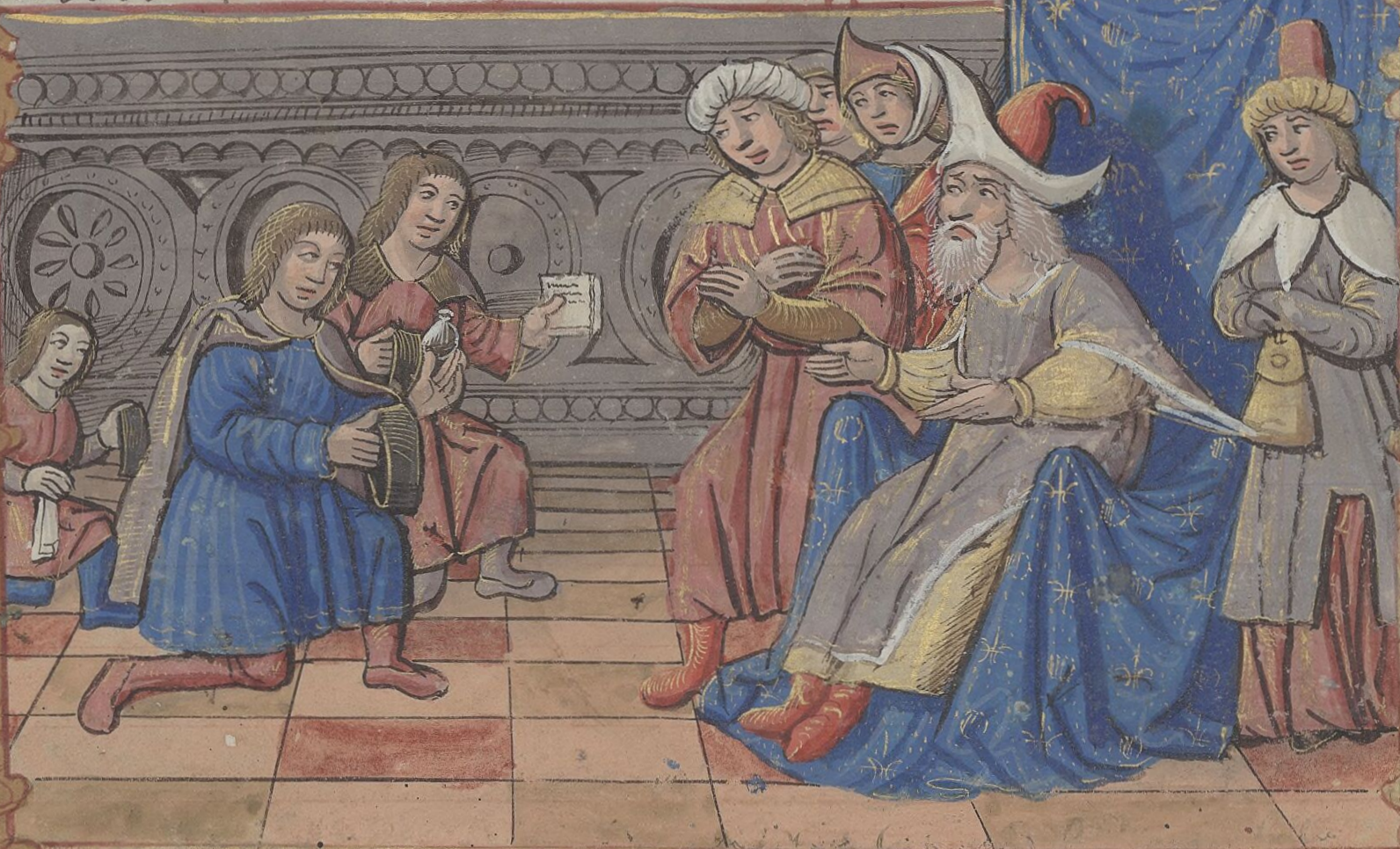
Polo meeting Kublai Khan

The book opens with a preface describing his father and uncle travelling to Bolghar where Prince Berke Khan lived. A year later, they went to Ukek and continued to Bukhara. There, an envoy from the Levant invited them to meet Kublai Khan, who had never met Europeans. In 1266, they reached the seat of Kublai Khan at Dadu, present-day Beijing, China. Kublai received the brothers with hospitality and asked them many questions regarding the European legal and political system. He also inquired about the Pope and Church in Rome. After the brothers answered the questions he tasked them with delivering a letter to the Pope, requesting 100 Christians acquainted with the Seven Arts (grammar, rhetoric, logic, geometry, arithmetic, music, and astronomy). Kublai Khan requested also that an envoy bring him back oil of the lamp in Jerusalem. The long sede vacante between the death of Pope Clement IV in 1268 and the election of his successor delayed the Polos in fulfilling Kublai's request. They followed the suggestion of Theobald Visconti, then papal legate for the realm of Egypt, and returned to Venice in 1269 or 1270 to await the nomination of the new Pope, which allowed Marco to see his father for the first time, at the age of fifteen or sixteen.

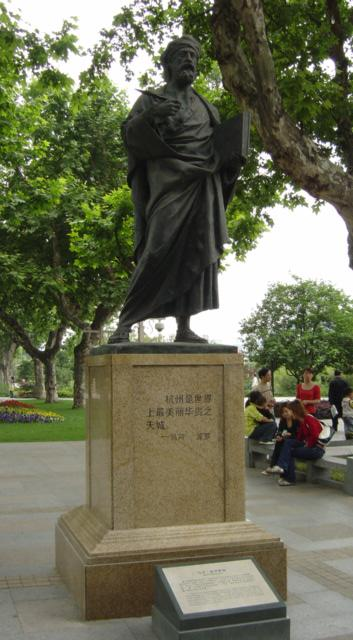
Statue of Marco Polo in Hangzhou, China

In 1271, Niccolò, Maffeo, and Marco Polo embarked on their voyage to fulfil Kublai's request. They sailed to Acre, and then rode on camels to the Persian port of Hormuz. The Polos wanted to sail straight into China, but the ships there were not seaworthy, so they continued overland through the Silk Road, until reaching Kublai's summer palace in Shangdu, near present-day Zhangjiakou. In one instance during their trip, the Polos joined a caravan of travelling merchants whom they crossed paths with. Unfortunately, the party was soon attacked by bandits, who used the cover of a sandstorm to ambush them. The Polos managed to fight and escape through a nearby town, but many members of the caravan were killed or enslaved. Three and a half years after leaving Venice, when Marco was about 21 years old, the Polos were welcomed by Kublai into his palace. The exact date of their arrival is unknown, but scholars estimate it to be between 1271 and 1275. (Note: Drogön Chögyal Phagpa, a Tibetan monk and confidant of Kublai Khan, mentions in his diaries that in 1271 a foreign friend of Kublai Khan visits – quite possibly one of the elder Polos or even Marco Polo himself, although no name was given. If this is not the case, a more likely date for their arrival is 1275 (or 1274, according to the research of Japanese scholar Matsuo Otagi).) On reaching the Yuan court, the Polos presented the sacred oil from Jerusalem and the papal letters to their patron.

Marco knew four languages, and the family had accumulated a great deal of knowledge and experience that was useful to Kublai. It is possible that he became a government official; he wrote about many imperial visits to China's southern and eastern provinces, the far south and Myanmar. They were highly respected and sought after in the Mongolian court, and so Kublai Khan decided to decline the Polos' requests to leave China. They became worried about returning home safely, believing that if Kublai died, his enemies might turn against them because of their close involvement with the ruler. In 1292, Kublai's great-nephew, then ruler of Persia, sent representatives to China in search of a potential wife, and they asked the Polos to accompany them, so they were permitted to return to Persia with the wedding party – which left that same year from Zaitun in southern China on a fleet of 14 junks. The party sailed to the port of Singapore, travelled north to Sumatra, and around the southern tip of India, eventually crossing the Arabian Sea to Hormuz. The two-year voyage was perilous – of the six hundred people (not including the crew) in the convoy, only eighteen had survived (including all three Polos). The Polos left the wedding party after reaching Hormuz and travelled overland to the port of Trebizond on the Black Sea, the present-day Trabzon.

=== Role of Rustichello ===
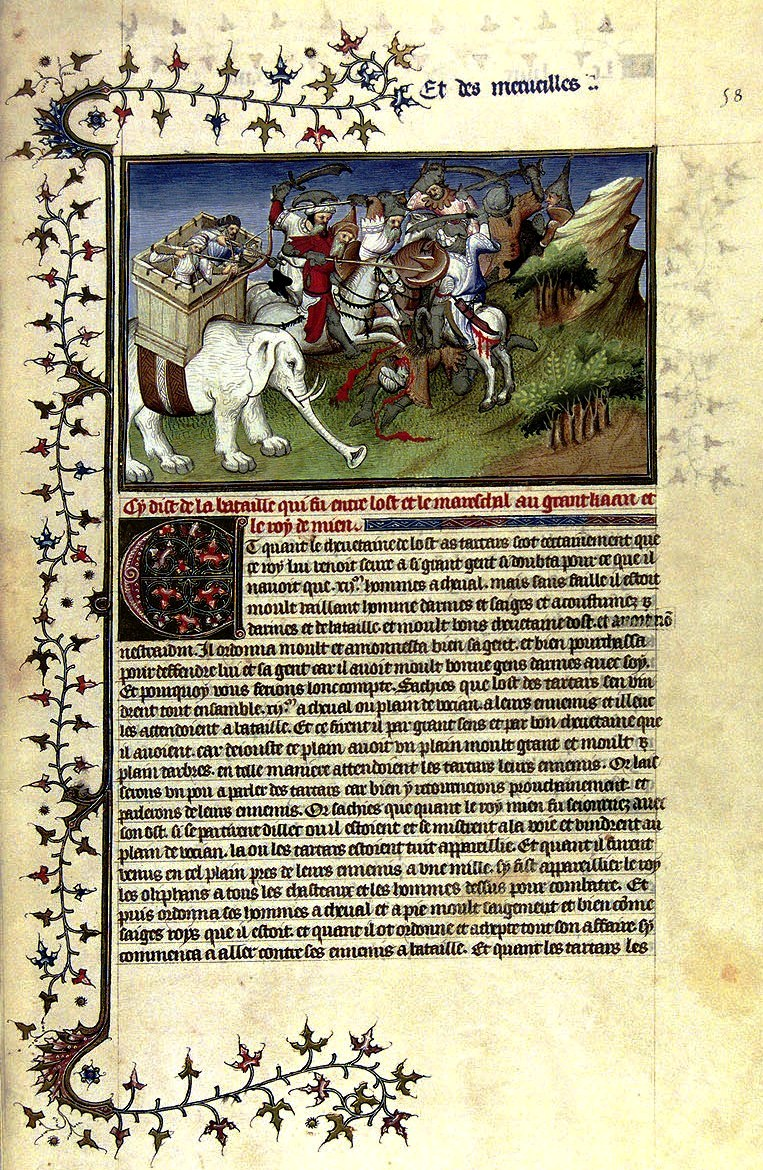
A page from Il Milione, from a manuscript believed to date between 1298 and 1299

The British scholar Ronald Latham has pointed out that The Book of Marvels was a collaboration written in 1298–1299 between Polo and a professional writer of romances, Rustichello of Pisa. It is believed that Polo related his memoirs orally to Rustichello da Pisa while both were prisoners of the Genova Republic. Rustichello wrote Devisement du Monde in Franco-Venetian language, which was a literary-only language widespread in northern Italy between the subalpine belt and the lower Po between the 13th and 15th centuries.

Latham also argued that Rustichello may have glamorised Polo's accounts, and added fantastic and romantic elements that made the book a bestseller. The Italian scholar Luigi Foscolo Benedetto had previously demonstrated that the book was written in the same "leisurely, conversational style" that characterised Rustichello's other works, and that some passages in the book were taken verbatim or with minimal modifications from other writings by Rustichello. For example, the opening introduction in The Book of Marvels to "emperors and kings, dukes and marquises" was lifted straight out of an Arthurian romance Rustichello had written several years earlier, and the account of the second meeting between Polo and Kublai Khan at the latter's court is almost the same as that of the arrival of Tristan at the court of King Arthur at Camelot in that same book. Latham believed that many elements of the book, such as legends of the Middle East and mentions of exotic marvels, might have been the work of Rustichello, who was giving what medieval European readers expected to find in a travel book.

=== Role of the Dominican Order ===
Apparently, from the very beginning, Marco's story aroused contrasting reactions, as it was received by some with a certain disbelief. The Dominican father Francesco Pipino was the author of a translation into Latin in 1302, just a few years after Marco's return to Venice. Francesco Pipino solemnly affirmed the truthfulness of the book and defined Marco as a "prudent, honoured and faithful man". In his writings, the Dominican brother Jacopo d'Acqui explains why his contemporaries were sceptical about the content of the book. He also relates that before dying, Marco Polo insisted that "he had told only a half of the things he had seen".

According to some recent research of the Italian scholar Antonio Montefusco, the very close relationship that Marco Polo cultivated with members of the Dominican Order in Venice suggests that local fathers collaborated with him for a Latin version of the book, which means that Rustichello's text was translated into Latin at the precise will of the Order.

Since Dominican fathers had among their missions that of evangelising foreign peoples (cf. the role of Dominican missionaries in China and in the Indies), it is reasonable to think that they considered Marco's book as a trustworthy piece of information for missions in the East. The diplomatic communications between Pope Innocent IV and Pope Gregory X with the Mongols were probably another reason for this endorsement. At the time, there was open discussion of a possible Christian-Mongol alliance with an anti-Islamic function. A Mongol delegate was solemnly baptised at the Second Council of Lyon. At the council, Pope Gregory X promulgated a new crusade to start in 1278 in liaison with the Mongols.

=== Authenticity and veracity ===
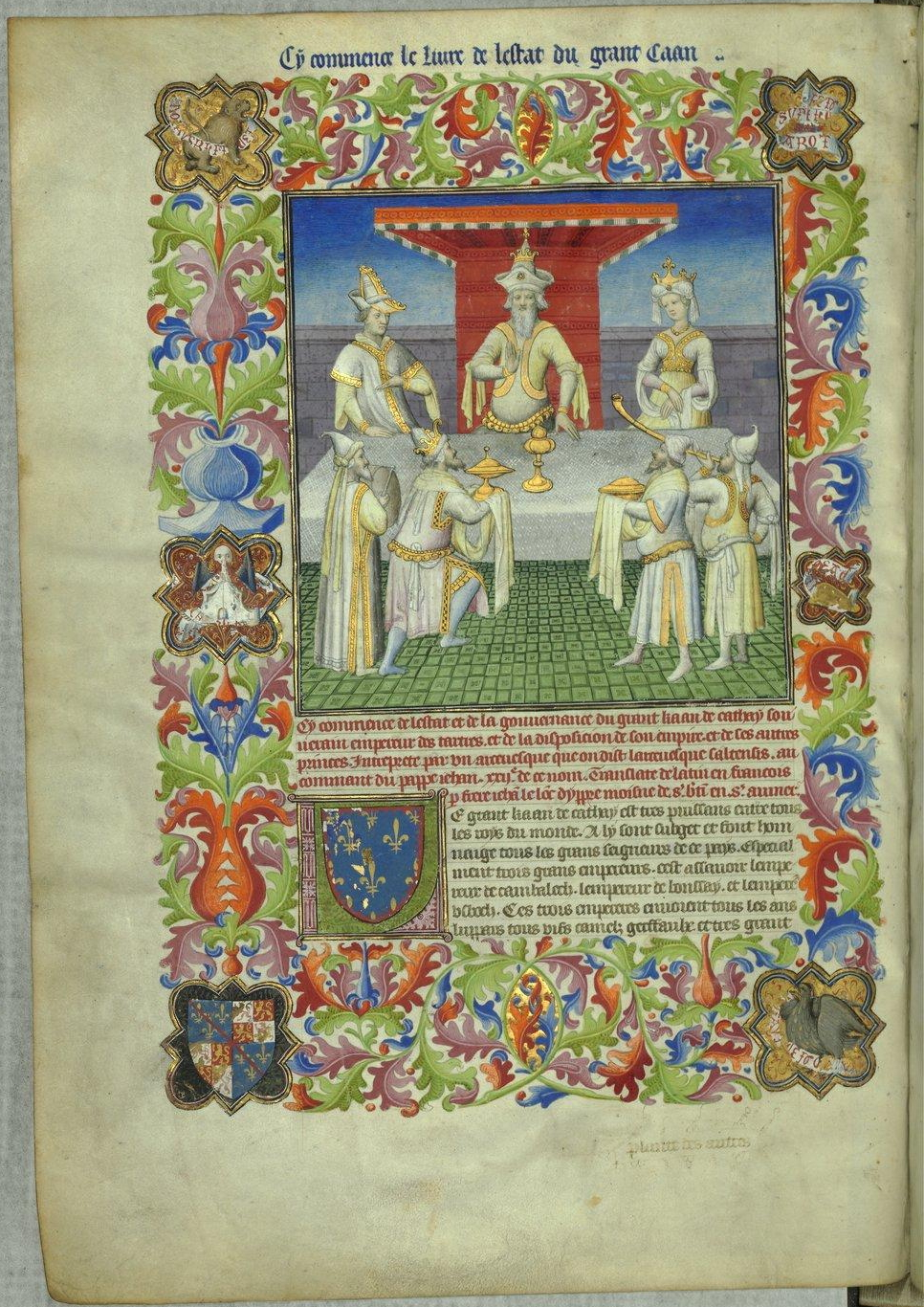
Kublai Khan's court, from the French "Livre des merveilles"

Since its publication, some have viewed the book with skepticism. Some in the Middle Ages regarded the book simply as a romance or fable, due largely to the sharp difference of its descriptions of a sophisticated civilisation in China to other early accounts by Giovanni da Pian del Carpine and William of Rubruck, who portrayed the Mongols as 'barbarians' who appeared to belong to 'some other world'. Doubts have also been raised in later centuries about Marco Polo's narrative of his travels in China, for example for his failure to mention the Great Wall of China, and in particular the difficulties in identifying many of the place names he used (the great majority, however, have since been identified). Many have questioned whether he had visited the places he mentioned in his itinerary, whether he had appropriated the accounts of his father and uncle or other travellers, and some doubted whether he even reached China, or that if he did, perhaps never went beyond Khanbaliq (Beijing).

It has been pointed out that Polo's accounts of China are more accurate and detailed than other travellers' accounts of the period. Polo had at times refuted the 'marvellous' fables and legends given in other European accounts, and despite some exaggerations and errors, Polo's accounts have relatively few of the descriptions of irrational marvels. In many cases of descriptions of events where he was not present (mostly given in the first part before he reached China, such as mentions of Christian miracles), he made a clear distinction that they are what he had heard rather than what he had seen. It is also largely free of the gross errors found in other accounts such as those given by the Moroccan traveller Ibn Battuta who had confused the Yellow River with the Grand Canal and other waterways, and believed that porcelain was made from coal.

Modern studies have further shown that details given in Marco Polo's book, such as the currencies used, salt productions and revenues, are accurate and unique. Such detailed descriptions are not found in other non-Chinese sources, and their accuracy is supported by archaeological evidence as well as Chinese records compiled after Polo had left China. His accounts are therefore unlikely to have been obtained second hand. Other accounts have also been verified; for example, when visiting Zhenjiang in Jiangsu, China, Marco Polo said that a large number of Christian churches had been built there. His claim is confirmed by a Chinese text of the 14th century explaining how a Sogdian named Mar-Sargis from Samarkand founded six Nestorian Christian churches there in addition to one in Hangzhou during the second half of the 13th century. His story of the princess Kököchin sent from China to Persia to marry the Īl-khān is also confirmed by independent sources in both Persia and China.

== Scholarly analyses ==
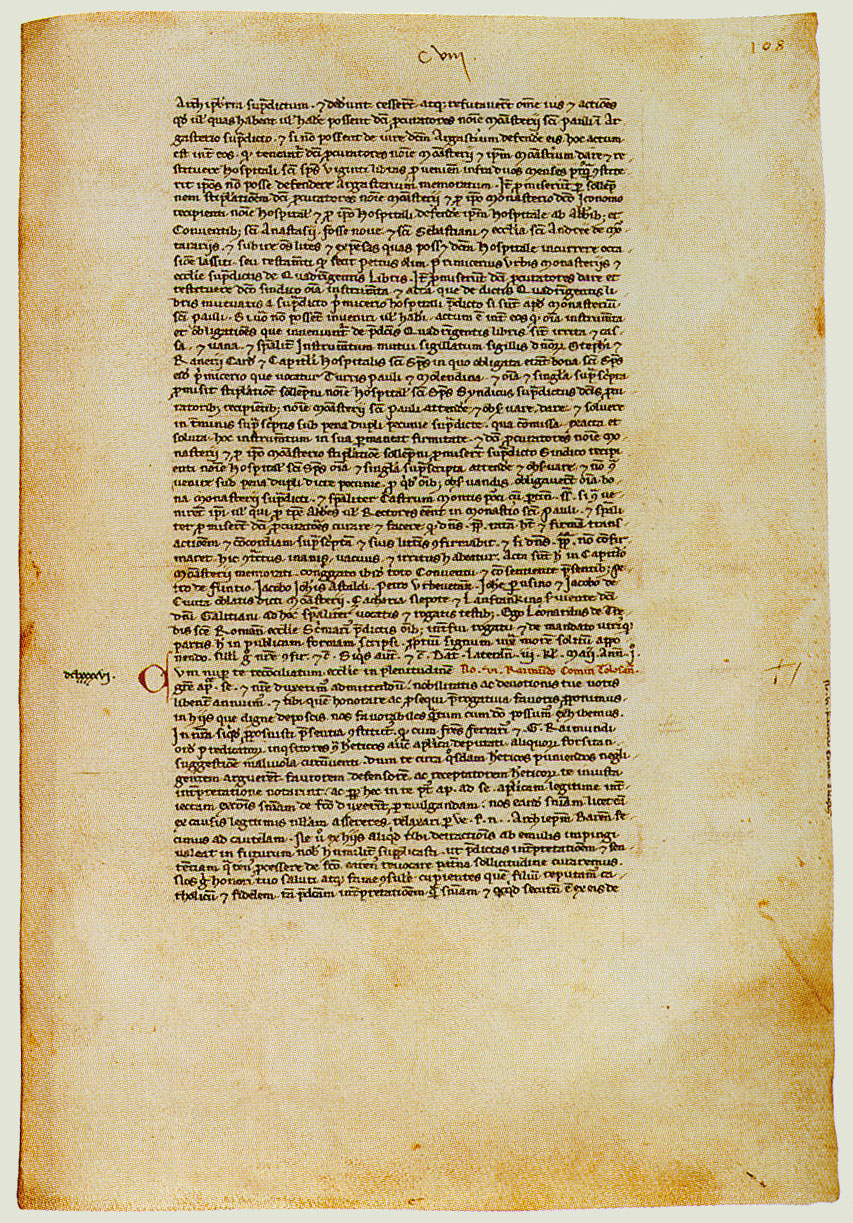
Text of the letter of Pope Innocent IV "to the ruler and people of the Tartars", brought to Güyüg Khan by John de Carpini, 1245

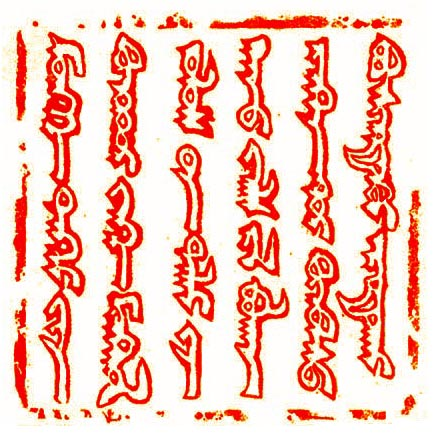
The seal of Güyük Khan using the classical Mongolian script, as found in a letter sent to the Roman Pope Innocent IV in 1246

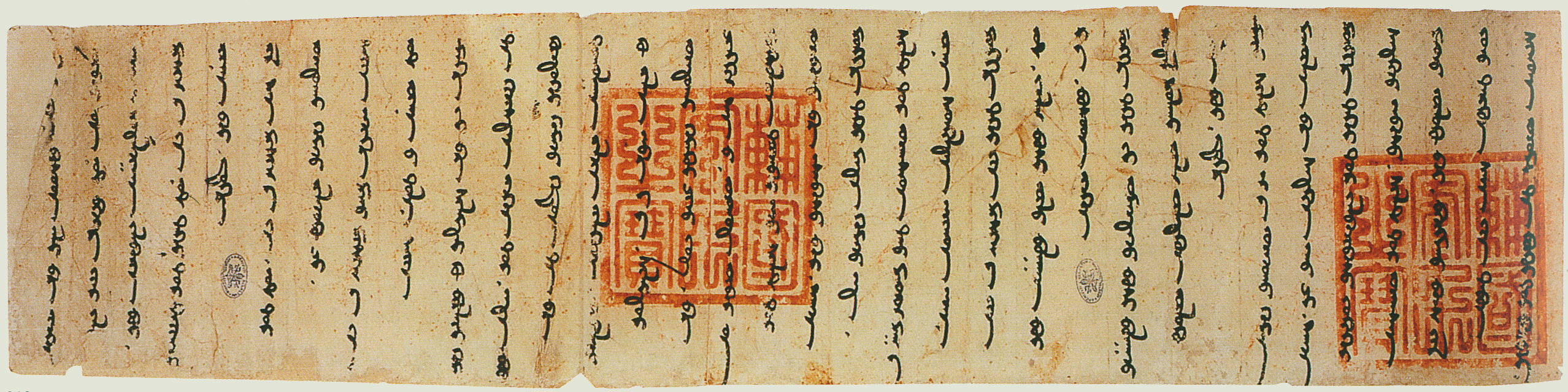
A letter from Arghun, Khan of the Mongol Ilkhanate, to Pope Nicholas IV, 1290

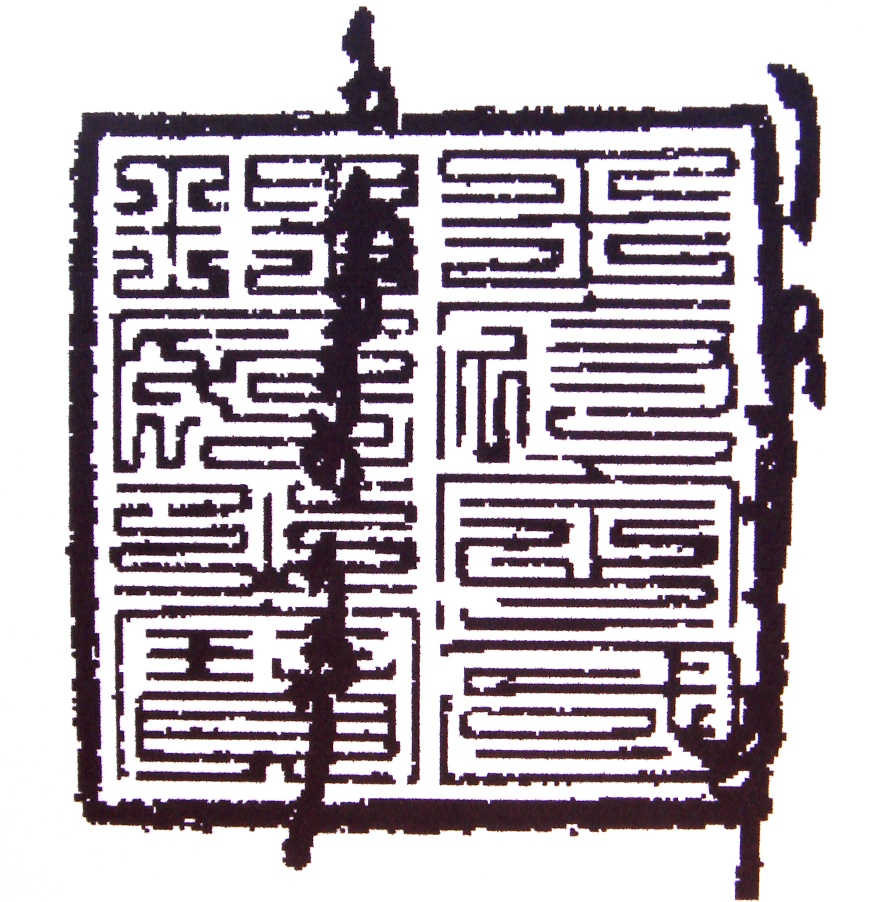
The seal of the Mongol ruler Ghazan, in a 1302 letter to Pope Boniface VIII, with an inscription in Chinese seal script

=== Explaining omissions ===
Sceptics have long wondered whether Marco Polo wrote his book based on hearsay, with some pointing to omissions about noteworthy practices and structures of China as well as the lack of details on some places in his book. While Polo describes paper money and the burning of coal, he fails to mention the Great Wall of China, tea, Chinese characters, chopsticks, or footbinding. His failure to note the presence of the Great Wall of China was first raised in the middle of the 17th century, and in the middle of the 18th century, it was suggested that he had never reached China. Later scholars such as John W. Haeger argued that Marco Polo might not have visited Southern China, in view of the lack of details in his description of southern Chinese cities compared to northern ones, while Herbert Franke also raised the possibility that Marco Polo had not been to China at all, and wondered if he had based his accounts on Persian sources, in view of his use of Persian expressions. This is taken further by Frances Wood, who claimed in her 1995 book Did Marco Polo Go to China? that at best Polo never went farther east than Persia (modern Iran), and that there is nothing in The Book of Marvels about China that could not have been obtained by reading Persian books. Wood maintains that it is more probable that Polo went only to Constantinople (modern Istanbul, Turkey) and some of the Italian merchant colonies around the Black Sea, picking hearsay from those travellers who had been farther east.

Supporters of Polo's basic accuracy countered on the points raised by sceptics such as footbinding and the Great Wall of China. Historian Stephen G. Haw argued that the Great Walls were built to keep out northern invaders, whereas the ruling dynasty during Marco Polo's visit were those very northern invaders. They note that the Great Wall familiar to us today is a Ming structure built some two centuries after Marco Polo's travels; and that the Mongol rulers whom Polo served controlled territories north and south of today's wall, and would have had no reason to maintain any fortifications that might have remained there from the earlier dynasties.

Other Europeans who travelled to Khanbaliq during the Yuan dynasty, such as Giovanni de' Marignolli and Odoric of Pordenone, said nothing about the wall either. The Muslim traveller Ibn Battuta, who asked about the wall when he visited China during the Yuan dynasty, could find no one who either had seen it or knew of anyone who had seen it, suggesting that while ruins of the wall constructed in the earlier periods might have existed, they were not significant or noteworthy at that time.

Haw argued that footbinding was not common even among Chinese during Polo's time and almost unknown among the Mongols. While the Italian missionary Odoric of Pordenone who visited Yuan China mentioned footbinding (it is however unclear whether he was merely relaying something he had heard as his description is inaccurate), no other foreign visitors to Yuan China mentioned the practice, perhaps an indication that the footbinding was not widespread or was not practised in an extreme form at that time. Marco Polo noted in the Toledo manuscript, the dainty walk of Chinese women who took very short steps.

It has been noted by other scholars that many of the things not mentioned by Marco Polo, such as tea and chopsticks, were not mentioned by other travellers either. Haw pointed out that despite the few omissions, Marco Polo's account is more extensive, more accurate and more detailed than those of other foreign travellers to China in this period. Marco Polo even observed Chinese nautical inventions such as the watertight compartments of bulkhead partitions in Chinese ships, knowledge of which he was keen to share with his fellow Venetians.

In addition to Haw, other scholars have argued in favour of the established view that Polo was in China, in response to Wood's book. The book has been criticised by figures including Igor de Rachewiltz (translator and annotator of The Secret History of the Mongols) and Morris Rossabi (author of Kublai Khan: His Life and Times). The historian David Morgan points out basic errors made in Wood's book such as confusing the Liao dynasty with the Jin dynasty, and he found no compelling evidence in the book that would convince him that Marco Polo did not go to China.

Haw argues in his book Marco Polo's China that Marco's account is much more correct and accurate than has often been supposed and that it is extremely unlikely that he could have obtained all the information in his book from secondhand sources. Haw criticizes Wood's approach to finding mention of Marco Polo in Chinese texts by contending that contemporaneous Europeans had little regard for using surnames and that a direct Chinese transliteration of the name "Marco" ignores the possibility of his taking on a Chinese or even Mongol name with no similarity to his Latin name.

In reply to Wood, Jørgen Jensen recalled the meeting of Marco Polo and Pietro d'Abano in the late 13th century. During this meeting, Marco gave Pietro details of the astronomical observations he had made on his journey. These observations are compatible with Marco's stay in China, Sumatra, and the South China Sea and are recorded in Pietro's book Conciliator Differentiarum, but not in Marco's Book of Travels.

Reviewing Haw's book, Peter Jackson (author of The Mongols and the West) has said that Haw "must surely now have settled the controversy surrounding the historicity of Polo's visit to China". Igor de Rachewiltz's review, which refutes Wood's points, concludes with a strongly worded condemnation:

I regret to say that F. W.'s book falls short of the standard of scholarship that one would expect in a work of this kind. Her book can only be described as deceptive, both in relation to the author and to the public at large. Questions are posed that, in the majority of cases, have already been answered satisfactorily ... her attempt is unprofessional; she is poorly equipped in the basic tools of the trade, i.e., adequate linguistic competence and research methodology ... and her major arguments cannot withstand close scrutiny. Her conclusion fails to consider all the evidence supporting Marco Polo's credibility.

=== Allegations of exaggeration ===
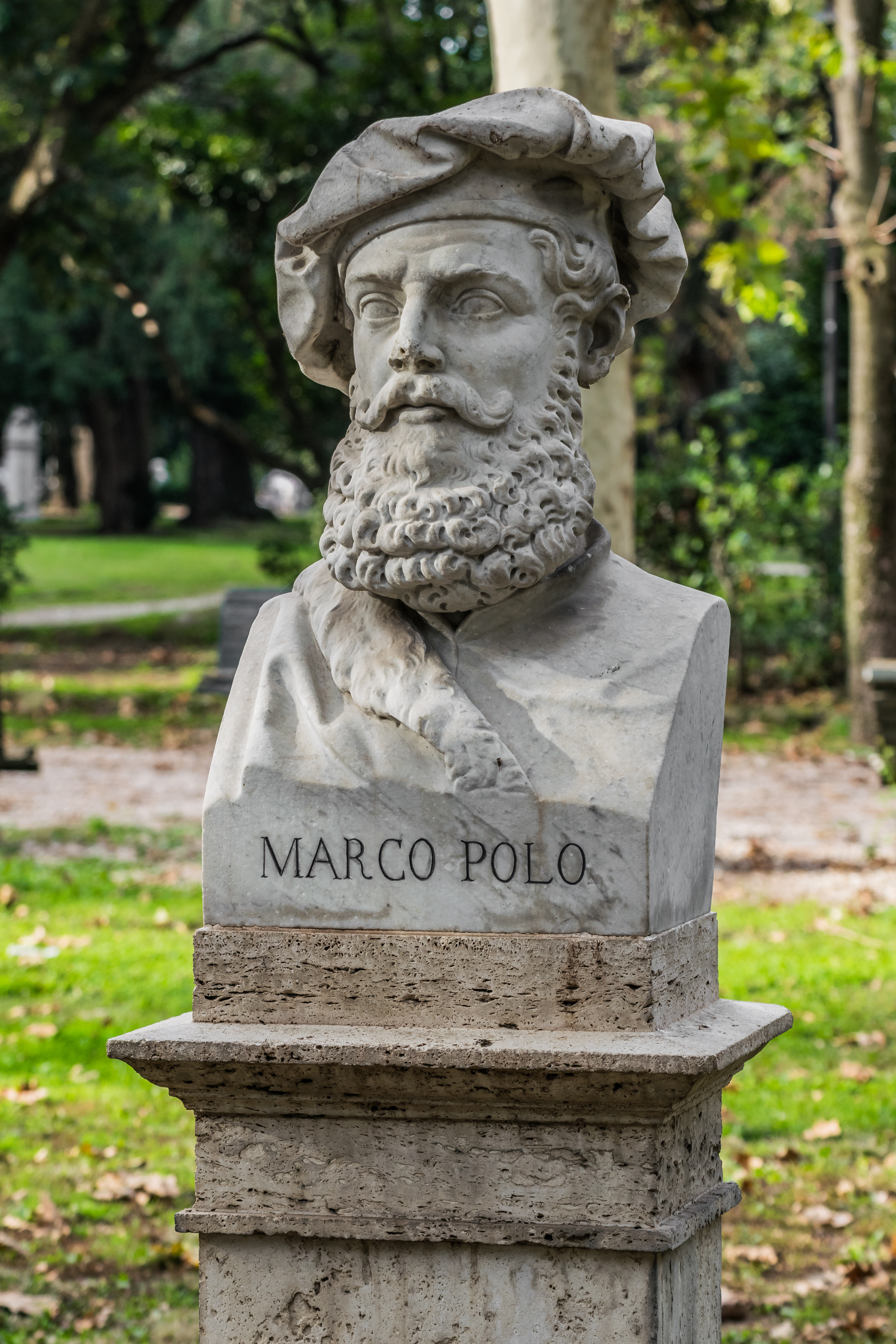
A bust of Marco Polo in the garden of Villa Borghese in Rome, Italy

Some scholars believe that Marco Polo exaggerated his importance in China. The British historian David Morgan thought that Polo had likely exaggerated and lied about his status in China, while Ronald Latham believed that such exaggerations were embellishments by his ghostwriter Rustichello da Pisa.

Et meser Marc Pol meisme, celui de cui trate ceste livre, seingneurie ceste cité por trois anz.

And the same Marco Polo, of whom this book relates, ruled this city for three years.

— Mario Eusebi, Marco Polo. Le divisement dou monde

This sentence in The Book of Marvels was interpreted as Marco Polo was "the governor" of the city of "Yangiu" Yangzhou for three years, and later of Hangzhou. This claim has raised some controversy. According to David Morgan no Chinese source mentions him as either a friend of the Emperor or as the governor of Yangzhou – indeed no Chinese source mentions Marco Polo at all. In the 1960s, the German historian Herbert Franke noted that all occurrences of Po-lo or Bolod in Yuan texts were names of people of Mongol or Turkic extraction.

In the 2010s the Chinese scholar Peng Hai claimed to have identified Marco Polo with a certain "Boluo" (孛罗; 孛羅; Bóluō), a courtier of the emperor, who is mentioned in Volume 119 of the History of Yuan (Yuánshǐ) commissioned by the succeeding Ming dynasty. The claim arises out of the report that Boluo was arrested in 1274 by an imperial dignitary named Saman (撒蠻; Sāmán) for walking on the same side of the road as a female courtesan, in contravention of the order for men and women to walk on opposite sides of the road inside the city. According to the History of Yuan, Boluo was released at the request of the emperor himself, and was then transferred to the region of Ningxia, in the northeast of present-day China, in the spring of 1275. The date could correspond to the first mission of which Marco Polo speaks.

If this identification is correct, there is a record about Marco Polo in Chinese sources. These conjectures seem to be supported by the fact that in addition to the imperial dignitary Saman (the one who had arrested the official named "Boluo"), the documents mention his brother, Xiangwei (相威; Xiāngwēi). According to sources, Saman died shortly after the incident, while Xiangwei was transferred to Yangzhou in 1282–1283. Marco Polo reports that he was moved to Hangzhou the following year, in 1284. It has been supposed that these displacements are due to the intention to avoid further conflicts between the two.

The sinologist Paul Pelliot thought that Polo might have served as an officer of the government salt monopoly in Yangzhou, which was a position of some significance that could explain the exaggeration.

It may seem unlikely that a European could hold a position of power in the Mongolian empire. Some records prove he was not the first nor the only one. In his book, Marco mentions an official named "Mar Sarchis" who probably was a Nestorian Christian bishop, and he says he founded two Christian churches in the region of "Caigiu". This official is actually mentioned in the local gazette Zhishun Zhenjian zhi under the name "Ma Xuelijisi" and the qualification of "General of Third Class". In the gazette, it is said Ma Xuelijsi was an assistant supervisor in the province of Zhenjiang for three years, and that during this time he founded two Christian churches. It is a well-documented fact that Kublai Khan trusted foreigners more than his Chinese subjects in internal affairs.

Stephen G. Haw challenges this idea that Polo exaggerated his own importance, writing that "contrary to what has often been said ... Marco does not claim any very exalted position for himself in the Yuan empire". He points out that Polo never claimed to hold high rank, such as a darughachi, who led a tumen – a unit that was normally 10,000 strong. Polo does not even imply that he had led 1,000 personnel. Haw points out that Polo himself appears to state only that he had been an emissary of the khan, in a position with some esteem. According to Haw, this is a reasonable claim if Polo was, for example, a keshig – a member of the imperial guard by the same name, which included as many as 14,000 individuals at the time.

Haw explains how the earliest manuscripts of Polo's accounts provide contradicting information about his role in Yangzhou, with some stating he was just a simple resident, others stating he was a governor, and Ramusio's manuscript claiming he was simply holding that office as a temporary substitute for someone else, yet all the manuscripts concur that he worked as an esteemed emissary for the khan.

Another contradictory claim is in chapter 145 when The Book of Marvels states that the three Polos provided the Mongols with technical advice on building mangonels during the Siege of Xiangyang,

Adonc distrent les .II. freres et lor filz meser Marc. "Grant Sire, nos avon avech nos en nostre mesnie homes qe firont tielz mangan qe giteront si grant pieres qe celes de la cité ne poront sofrir mes se renderont maintenant."

Then the two brothers and their son Marc said: "Great Lord, in our entourage we have men who will build such mangonels which launch such great stones, that the inhabitants of the city will not endure it and will immediately surrender."

— Mario Eusebi, Marco Polo. Le divisement dou monde

Since the siege was over in 1273, before Marco Polo had arrived in China for the first time, the claim cannot be true. The Mongol army that besieged Xiangyang did have foreign military engineers, but they were mentioned in Chinese sources as being from Baghdad and had Arabic names. In this respect, Igor de Rachewiltz recalls that the claim that the three Polo were present at the siege of Xiangyang is not present in all manuscripts, but Niccolò and Matteo could have made this suggestion. Therefore, this claim seems a subsequent addition to give more credibility to the story.

=== Errors ===
A number of errors in Marco Polo's account have been noted: for example, he described the bridge later known as Marco Polo Bridge as having twenty-four arches instead of eleven or thirteen. He also said that the city wall of Khanbaliq had twelve gates when it had only eleven. Archaeologists have also pointed out that Polo may have mixed up the details from the two attempted invasions of Japan by Kublai Khan in 1274 and 1281. Polo wrote of five-masted ships, when archaeological excavations found that the ships had only three masts.

=== Appropriation ===
Historian Frances Wood accused Marco Polo of taking other people's accounts in his book, retelling other stories as his own, or basing his accounts on Persian guidebooks or other lost sources. For example, Sinologist Francis Woodman Cleaves noted that Polo's account of the voyage of the princess Kököchin from China to Persia to marry the Īl-khān in 1293 has been confirmed by a passage in the 15th-century Chinese work Yongle Encyclopedia and by the Persian historian Rashid-al-Din Hamadani in his work Jami' al-tawarikh. However, neither of these accounts mentions Polo or indeed any European as part of the bridal party, and Wood used the lack of mention of Polo in these works as an example of Polo's "retelling of a well-known tale". David O. Morgan, in Polo's defence, noted that even the princess herself was not mentioned in the Chinese source and that it would have been surprising if Polo had been mentioned by Rashid-al-Din.

Historian Igor de Rachewiltz strongly criticised Wood's arguments in his review of her book. Rachewiltz argued that Marco Polo's account allows the Persian and Chinese sources to be reconciled – by relaying the information that two of the three envoys sent (mentioned in the Chinese source and whose names accord with those given by Polo) had died during the voyage, it explains why only the third who survived, Coja/Khoja, was mentioned by Rashìd al-Dìn. Polo had therefore completed the story by providing information not found in either source. He also noted that the only Persian source that mentions the princess was not completed until 1310–1311; therefore, Marco Polo could not have learned the information from any Persian book. According to de Rachewiltz, the concordance of Polo's detailed account of the princess with other independent sources that gave only incomplete information is proof of the veracity of Polo's story and his presence in China.

=== Assessments ===
Morgan writes that since much of what The Book of Marvels has to say about China is "demonstrably correct", any claim that Polo did not go to China "creates far more problems than it solves", therefore the "balance of probabilities" strongly suggests that Polo really did go to China, even if he exaggerated somewhat his importance in China. Haw dismisses the various anachronistic criticisms of Polo's accounts that started in the 17th century, and highlights Polo's accuracy in a great part of his accounts, for example on features of the landscape such as the Grand Canal of China. "If Marco was a liar," Haw writes, "then he must have been an implausibly meticulous one."

In 2012, the University of Tübingen Sinologist and historian Hans Ulrich Vogel released a detailed analysis of Polo's description of currencies, salt production and revenues, and argued that the evidence supports his presence in China because he included details which he could not have otherwise known. Vogel noted that no other Western, Arab, or Persian sources have given such accurate and unique details about the currencies of China, for example, the shape and size of the paper, the use of seals, the various denominations of paper money as well as variations in currency usage in different regions of China, such as the use of cowry shells in Yunnan, details supported by archaeological evidence and Chinese sources compiled long after the Polos had left China. His accounts of salt production and revenues from the salt monopoly are also accurate, and accord with Chinese documents of the Yuan era.

Economic historian Mark Elvin, in his preface to Vogel's 2013 monograph, concludes that Vogel "demonstrates by specific example after specific example the ultimately overwhelming probability of the broad authenticity" of Polo's account. Many problems were caused by the oral transmission of the original text and the proliferation of significantly different hand-copied manuscripts. For instance, did Polo exert "political authority" (seignora) in Yangzhou or merely "sojourn" (sejourna) there? Elvin concludes that "those who doubted, although mistaken, were not always being casual or foolish", but "the case as a whole had now been closed": the book is, "in essence, authentic, and, when used with care, in broad terms to be trusted as a serious though obviously not always final, witness".

== Legacy ==
=== Further exploration ===
Other lesser-known European explorers had already travelled to China, such as Giovanni da Pian del Carpine with Benedict of Poland, but Polo's book meant that his journey was the first to be widely known. Christopher Columbus was inspired enough by Polo's description of the Far East to want to visit those lands for himself. A copy of Polo's book was among his belongings, with handwritten annotations.

Bento de Góis, inspired by Polo's writings of a Christian kingdom in the east, travelled 6,400 kilometres (4,000 mi) in three years across Central Asia. He never found the kingdom but ended his travels at the Great Wall of China in 1605, proving that Cathay was what Matteo Ricci (1552–1610) called China.

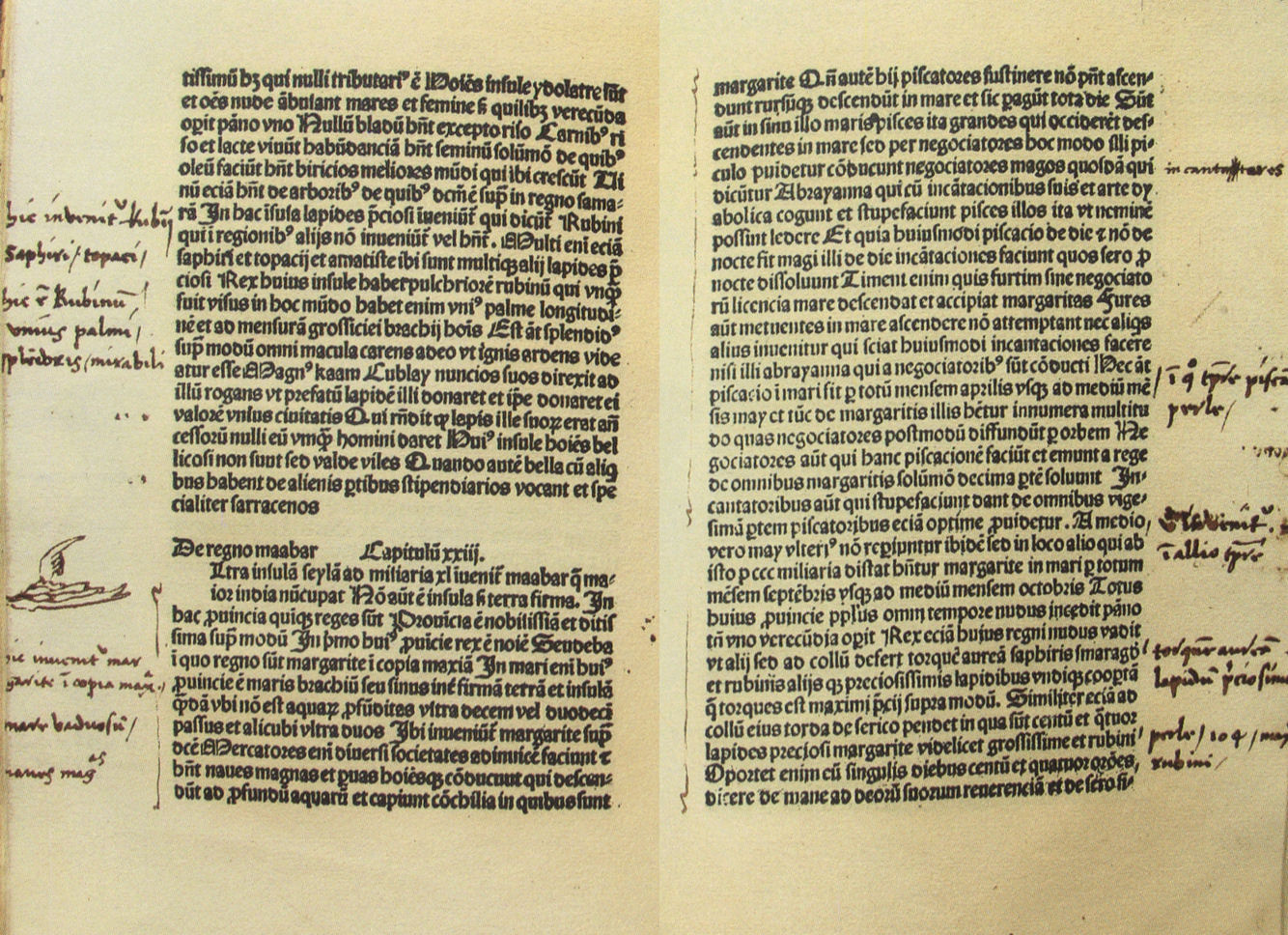
Handwritten notes by Christopher Columbus on a Latin edition of Polo's book

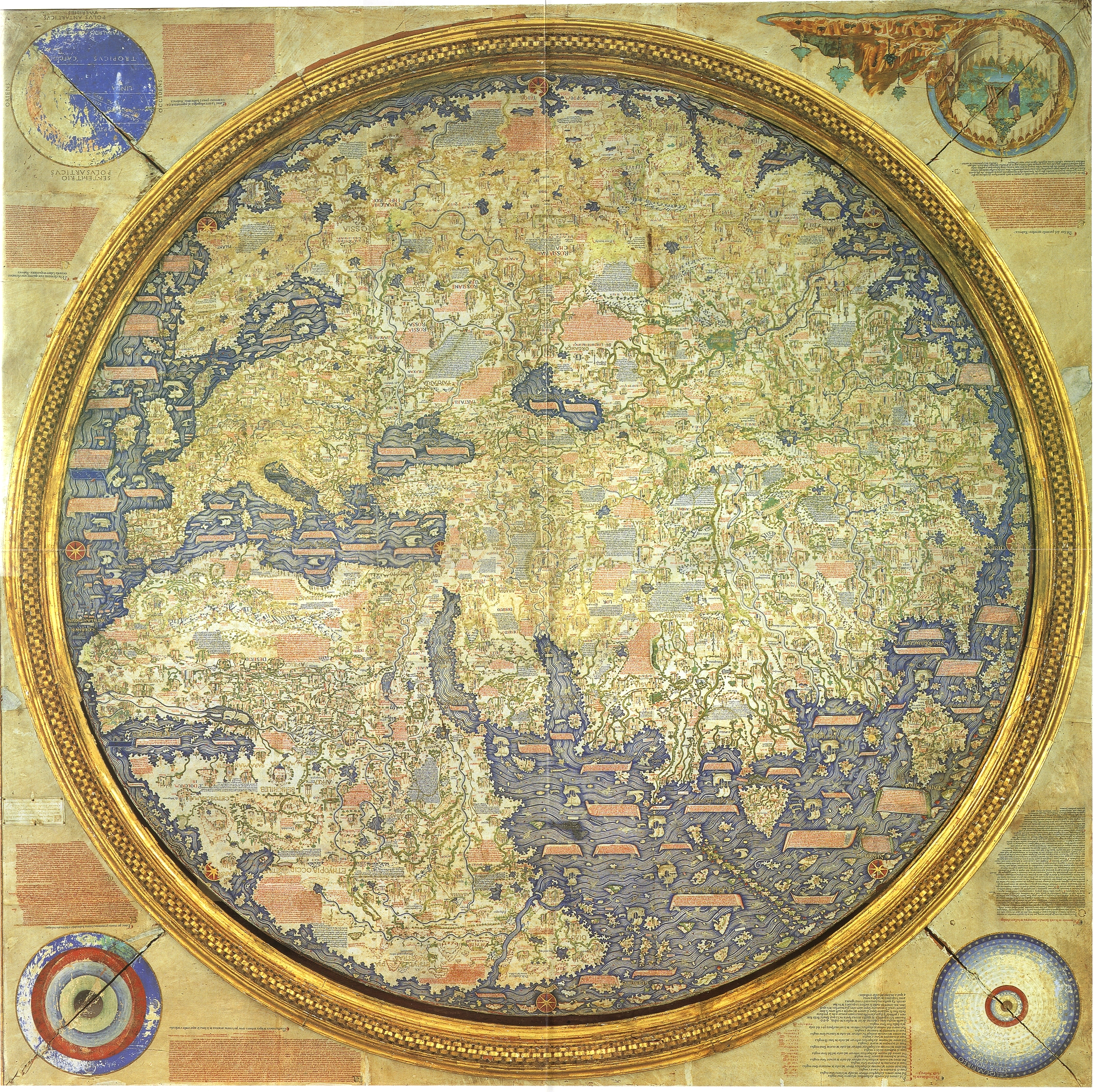
The Fra Mauro map, published around 1450 by the Venetian monk Fra Mauro

=== Cartography ===
Marco Polo's travels may have had some influence on the development of European cartography, ultimately leading to the European voyages of exploration a century later. The 1453 Fra Mauro map was said by Giovanni Battista Ramusio (disputed by historian/cartographer Piero Falchetta, in whose work the quote appears) to have been partially based on the one brought from Cathay by Marco Polo:

That fine illuminated world map on parchment, which can still be seen in a large cabinet alongside the choir of their monastery [the Camaldolese monastery of San Michele di Murano] was by one of the brothers of the monastery, who took great delight in the study of cosmography, diligently drawn and copied from a most beautiful and very old nautical map and a world map that had been brought from Cathay by the most honourable Messer Marco Polo and his father.

— Giovanni Battista Ramusio

Though Marco Polo never produced a map that illustrated his journey, his family drew several maps of the Far East based on the traveller's accounts. These collections of maps were signed by Polo's three daughters, Fantina, Bellela and Moreta. The authenticity of these maps is uncertain. Benjamin B. Olshin, a historian who wrote for the University of Chicago Press has been unable to "establish the authenticity" of these maps once owned by Marcian Rossi, an Italian immigrant living in California during the 1930s known for peddling hoaxes. These maps have been compared to the Zeno Map hoax. However, Olshin made no mention of the improbability that they are real. According to The Telegraph, a radiocarbon study of the sheepskin the maps are made of date back to the 15th or 16th century strongly suggesting they are copies of the original maps.

=== Pasta myth ===
There is a legend about Marco Polo importing pasta from China; however, it is actually a popular misconception, originating with the Macaroni Journal, published by a food industry association with the goal of promoting the use of pasta in the United States. Marco Polo describes in his book a food similar to "lasagna", but he uses a term with which he was already familiar. Pasta had already been invented in Italy a long time before Marco Polo's travels to Asia.

According to the National Macaroni Manufacturers Association and food writer Jeffrey Steingarten, durum wheat was introduced by Arabs from Libya, during their rule over Sicily in the late 9th century, predating Marco Polo's travels by about four centuries. Steingarten mentioned that Jane Grigson believed the Marco Polo story to have originated in the 1920s or 1930s in an advertisement for a Canadian spaghetti company.

=== Commemoration ===
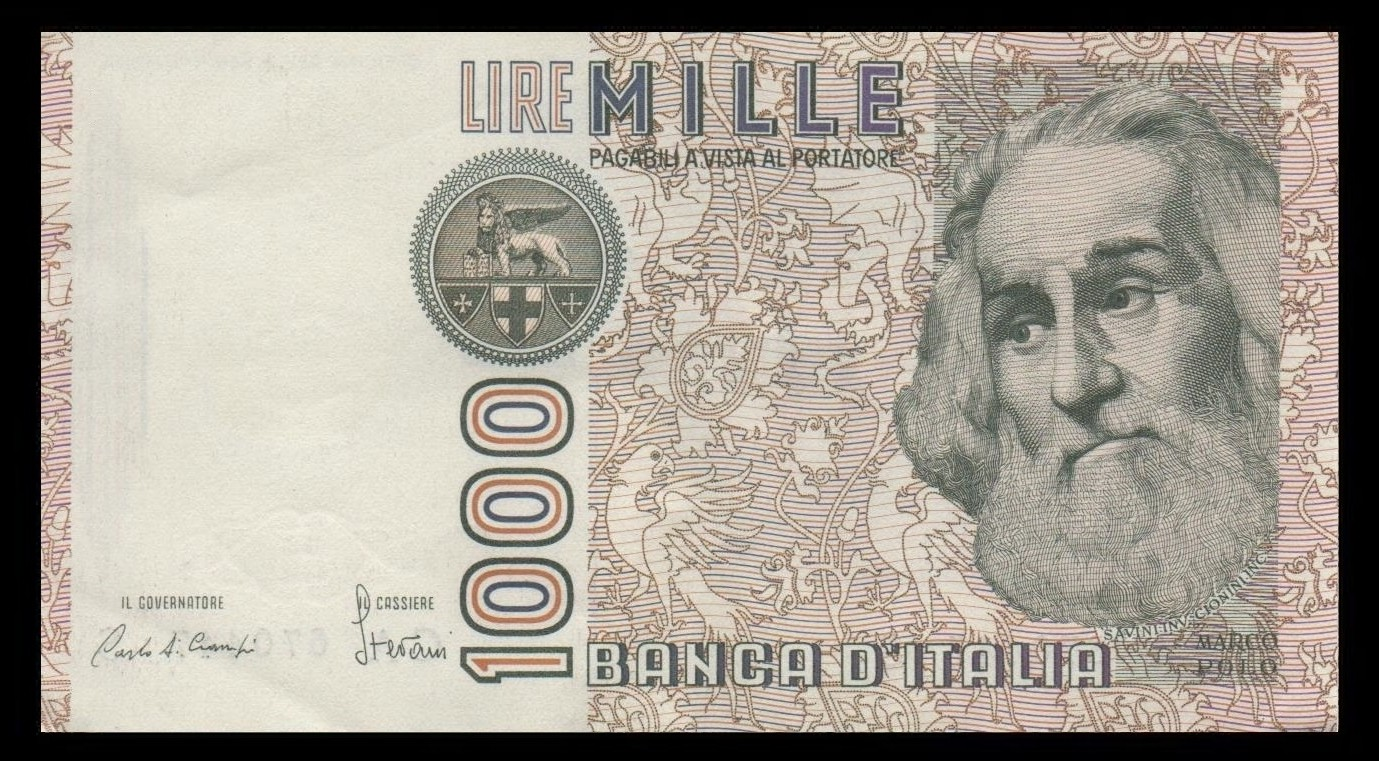
An Italian banknote issued in 1982, portraying Marco Polo

The Marco Polo sheep, a subspecies of Ovis ammon, is named after the explorer, who described it during his crossing of Pamir (ancient Mount Imeon) in 1271. (Note: "Then there are sheep here as big as asses; and their tails are so large and fat, that one tail shall weigh some 30 lb [14 kg]. They are fine fat beasts, and afford capital mutton.")

In 1851, a three-masted clipper built in Saint John, New Brunswick took his name. The Marco Polo was the first ship to sail around the world in under six months. The airport in Venice is named Venice Marco Polo Airport.

A square in Tianjin is named Marco Polo Square. In 2010, the Marco Polo Memorial Hall was erected in Yangzhou, and renovated in 2023.

Croatian state-owned shipping company's (Jadrolinija) ship connecting Split with Ancona in Italy is named after Marco Polo.

=== Arts, entertainment, and media ===
==== Film ====
- The Adventures of Marco Polo (1938), directed by Archie Mayo
- Marco Polo (1962)
- Marco the Magnificent (1965)
- Marco (1973), directed by Seymour Robbie
- Marco Polo (馬哥波羅) (1975), directed by Chang Cheh
- Marco Polo Junior Versus the Red Dragon (1972), Australian animated film by Eric Porter

==== Games ====
- The game "Marco Polo" is a form of tag played in a swimming pool or on land, with slightly modified rules.
- Polo appears as a Great Explorer in the 2008 strategy video game Civilization Revolution.
- Marco Polo's 1292 voyage from China is used as a backdrop for the plot of Uncharted 2: Among Thieves (2009), where Nathan Drake, the protagonist, searches for the Cintamani Stone, which was from the fabled city of Shambhala.
- A board game The Voyages of Marco Polo plays over a map of Eurasia, with multiple routes to 'recreate' Polo's journey.

==== Literature ====
The travels of Marco Polo are fictionalised in a number of works, such as:

- Brian Oswald Donn-Byrne's Messer Marco Polo (1921)
- Eugene O'Neill's Marco Millions (1928)
- Italo Calvino's novel Invisible Cities (1972), in which Polo appears as a pivotal character.
- Gary Jennings' novel The Journeyer (1984)
- Avram Davidson's novel (written with Grania Davis) Marco Polo and the Sleeping Beauty (1988), a serio-comic fantasy with Polo as the protagonist.
- James Rollins' SIGMA Force Book 4: The Judas Strain (2007), in which facts about Polo's travels and conjecture about secrets he kept are interleaved with modern-day action.

==== Television ====
- In the 1953 television series You Are There, Polo was portrayed by John Cassavetes in the episode "The Great Adventure of Marco Polo".
- In the 1964 serial Marco Polo of the television series Doctor Who, Polo was portrayed by Mark Eden.
- In the 1979 anime The Adventures of Marco Polo, Polo is voiced by Kei Tomiyama.
- The television miniseries, Marco Polo (1982), featuring Ken Marshall, Burt Lancaster and Ruocheng Ying, and directed by Giuliano Montaldo, depicts Polo's travels. It won two Emmy Awards, and was nominated for six more.
- The television film, Marco Polo (2007), starring Brian Dennehy as Kublai Khan, and Ian Somerhalder as Marco, portrays Marco Polo being left alone in China while his uncle and father return to Venice, to be reunited with him many years later.
- In the Footsteps of Marco Polo (2009) is a PBS documentary about two friends (Denis Belliveau and Francis O'Donnell) who conceived of the ultimate road trip to retrace Marco Polo's journey from Venice to China via land and sea.
- In Search of Marco Polo (2013), a Croatian documentary miniseries written and directed by Miro Branković.
- Marco Polo (2014–2016) is a Netflix television drama series about Marco Polo's early years in the court of Kublai Khan created by John Fusco.

== See also ==
- Chronology of European exploration of Asia
- John of Montecorvino, Catholic Italian missionary to China
- John Mandeville
- Caterina Vilioni (d. 1342), an Italian woman whose tombstone was found in Yangzhou, China
- Rabban Bar Sauma, Uyghur Nestorian Christian monk from Zhongdu (Khanbaliq, modern Beijing) who led a Mongol diplomatic mission to medieval European monarchs and the Pope, visiting Greece, Italy, and France

== Sources ==
- Bergreen, Laurence (2007). Marco Polo: From Venice to Xanadu. Knopf Doubleday Publishing Group. ISBN 978-0-307-26769-6.
- Bram, Leon L.; Phillips, Robert S.; Dickey, Norma H. (1983). Funk & Wagnalls New Encyclopedia. New York: Funk & Wagnalls. ISBN 978-0-8343-0051-4. (Article republished in 2006 World Almanac Books, available online from History.com)
- Brook, Timothy (2010). The Troubled Empire: China in the Yuan and Ming Dynasties. Harvard University Press. ISBN 978-0-674-04602-3.
- Edwards, Mike (2005). Marco Polo, Part 1. Washington, D.C.: National Geographic Society. Archived from the original on 5 February 2008.
- "Marco Polo". The New Encyclopædia Britannica Macropedia. Vol. 9 (15 ed.). Encyclopædia Britannica, Inc. 2002. ISBN 978-0-85229-787-2.
- "Marco Polo". Encyclopædia Britannica. 2010. Archived from the original on 8 May 2015.
- Eusebi, Mario; Burgio, Eugenio (2018). Eusebi, Mario; Burgio, Eugenio (eds.). Marco Polo. Le divisement dou monde [Marco Polo. The division of the World] (PDF). Medieval and Modern Philologies, Western Series 13 (in Italian). Vol. 16. Venice: Università Ca' Foscari (Venice University Press). doi:10.14277/978-88-6969-223-9/FMM-19. eISSN 2610-9441. ISBN 978-88-6969-223-9. ISSN 2610-945X. Archived (PDF) from the original on 30 April 2019.
- Falchetta, Piero (2006). Fra Mauro's World Map. Turnhout: Brepols. ISBN 978-2-503-51726-1.
- Landström, Björn (1967). Columbus: the story of Don Cristóbal Colón, Admiral of the Ocean. New York City: Macmillan.
- Lubbock, Basil (2008). The Colonial Clippers. Read Books. ISBN 978-1-4437-7119-1.
- Nicol, Donald M. (1992). Byzantium and Venice: a study in diplomatic and cultural relations. Cambridge University Press. ISBN 978-0-521-42894-1.
- Parker, John (2004). "Marco Polo". The World Book Encyclopedia. Vol. 15 (illustrated ed.). United States: World Book, Inc. ISBN 978-0-7166-0104-3.
- Power, Eileen Edna (2007). Medieval People. BiblioBazaar. ISBN 978-1-4264-6777-6.
- Puljiz-Šostik, Željana (2015). Marco Polo i njegov Le Divisiment dou monde (Opis svijeta): fikcija i fakcija u književnoj historiografiji [Marco Polo and his Description of the world: fact and fiction in the history of literature] (in Croatian). Zagreb: Faculty of Humanities and Social Sciences, University of Zagreb. Archived from the original on 6 July 2017.
- Winchester, Simon (2008). The Man Who Loved China: Joseph Needham and the Making of a Masterpiece. New York: HarperCollins. ISBN 978-0-06-088459-8.
- Wood, Frances (1998). Did Marco Polo Go To China?. Westview Press. ISBN 978-0-8133-8999-8.
- Yule, Henry; Cordier, Henri (1993). The Travels Of Marco Polo. Mineola: Dover Publications. ISBN 978-0-486-27586-4. LCCN 92039066. OCLC 27012654. OL 1734231M.
