= Donata Badoer =

Italian noblewoman (c. 1280 – 1333/1336)

- Born: c. 1280; Venice, Republic of Venice
- Died: between 12 July 1333 and 4 March 1336 (aged 52–56); Venice, Republic of Venice
- Spouse: Marco Polo (m. 1300; died 1324)
- Children: 3, including Fantina Polo
- Father: Vitale Badoer
- Family: Badoer

Donata Badoer (c. 1280 – between 1333 and 1336) was an Italian noblewoman from the Republic of Venice. She is best known as the wife of Marco Polo.

Belonging to the Venetian patrician family of Badoer, she was the daughter of merchant Vitale Badoer. In 1300, she married Marco Polo, the Venetian explorer, son of Niccolò Polo. From the union three daughters were born: Fantina, Belella and Moreta Polo.

== Bibliography ==
- Hart, Henry H. (1942). Venetian Adventurer: Being an Acount [sic] of the Life and Times and of the Book of Messer Marcco Polo. California: Stanford University Press.
