= Denis Belliveau =

American photographer and explorer

- Born: Whitestone, Queens, New York
- Education: School of Visual Arts
- Occupations: Photographer, author, educator, explorer
- Awards: Flag Expedition for The Explorers Club, National Emmy Nomination for In the Footsteps of Marco Polo, Kodak's Gallery Award

Denis Belliveau is an American photographer, writer and explorer notable for retracing Marco Polo's route from Europe to Asia and back, a feat which culminated in the publication of the documentary and book titled In the Footsteps of Marco Polo; the documentary has been used by Belliveau to create a unique interdisciplinary educational curriculum that he presents at schools and libraries across the United States and internationally. As a "technical scuba diver with over 600 dives on the Mesoamerican Reef," Belliveau's photography was instrumental in establishing the definitive map for the coral reef of the Mexican island of Cozumel. Belliveau also participated in an historic archaeological dig in southwest France, unearthing a centuries-old Christian monastery, located at the current site of Abbatiale Saint-Maixent de Saint-Maixent-l'École. In addition, Belliveau's photography and writing have been highlighted in numerous periodicals, magazines and books, including The New York Times, Petersen's Photographic Magazine, Smithsonian Magazine and BBC's Planet Earth.

== Early life ==
Denis Belliveau was born in Whitestone, Queens; as a Roman Catholic Christian, he was "inspired to follow his passion for art and travel by his uncle, Father Paul Belliveau, a Maryknoll missionary", who was stationed in Guatemala, Honduras, and El Salvador. He studied at the High School of Art and Design as well as the School of Visual Arts, both of which are in Manhattan, New York. At the School of Visual Arts, Denis Belliveau "earned an Associates Degree in painting, sculpture and fine arts." In 1987, Belliveau joined his parents' photography studio that specialized in weddings and during the off-season, he would travel; it was during this time that he joined professional photography organizations, including Kodak.

== Career ==
After Denis Belliveau left the wedding photography studio in 1991, he became captivated by the idea of "following Marco Polo's route from Venice to China and back." As such, Denis Belliveau and a friend named Francis O'Donnell, who met on an archaeological dig in Saint-Maixent-l'École, southwest France, and hailed from the same academic institution, decided to trace Marco Polo's journey as recorded in Polo's Book of the Marvels of the World. Denis Belliveau, along with his companion, was the first individual "to visit and document every region Marco Polo claimed to have traveled using only" land and sea methods of transportation. Belliveau's story and photography on this mission was compiled into a News and Documentary Emmy nominated film, as well as a book by the same name (published by Rowman & Littlefield), titled In the Footsteps of Marco Polo; it "has been used as the basis for a unique curriculum" throughout schools in the United States and around the world. The same academic press has used Denis Belliveau's images in other books, such as Digging Through The Bible by Richard A. Freund.

Denis Belliveau was "the Director of Photography and Senior Cameraman for the national public television series Real Moms, Real Stories, Real Savvy", which was acquired by Disney in 2010. He received Eastman Kodak's highest honor, its Gallery Award, for an image of a Quechua boy captured in Peru. In total, Denis Belliveau's career has taken him to over sixty countries in the world.
