= Fantina Polo =

Italian noblewoman (1303–1375/1385)

Fantina Polo (1303 – between 28 August 1375 and 18 December 1385) was a noblewoman of the Republic of Venice.

== Biography ==
A Venetian patrician, she was the daughter of Marco Polo and Donata Badoer. After the death of her father, Fantina was forced to hand over the management of all her assets to her husband Marco Bragadin (whom she married in 1318), even those entrusted to her directly and excluded from her dowry. Although Bragadin himself promised to return what rightfully belonged to her, he never did return her paternal assets. After the death of her husband, to avoid having everything inherited by her husband's family, Fantina turned to the Venetian judiciary. With the help of her father's will, before the judges Marco Dandolo, Giovanni Michiel and Natale Ghezzo, she managed to prevail over Andrea Contarini and Niccolò Morosini, both prosecutors of San Marco, and to obtain financial compensation for the costs of the trial and to regain what had been given to her by her father himself.

Fantina was the firstborn daughter of Marco and Donata. Her name appears in several family cases. She died on some unknown date between 28 August 1375 and 18 December 1385.

== Bibliography ==
- Bergreen, Laurence (2007), Marco Polo: From Venice to Xanadu, Knopf Doubleday Publishing Group, ISBN 978-0-307-26769-6
- Hart, Henry H. (1942). Venetian Adventurer: Being an Account of the Life and Times and of the Book of Messer Marco Polo. California: Stanford University Press.
- Raffaele Santoro; Alessandra Schiavon; Chiara Scarpa; Marco Biccai, eds. (1366). Carteggio di Fantina Polo (Archivio di Stato di Venezia ed.). Venezia.
- Zorzi, Marino (1988). Collezioni di antichità a Venezia:nei secoli della repubblica (Biblioteca Nazionale Marciana ed.). Roma: Istituto Poligrafico della Zecca e dello Stato. ISBN 8-824-03026-2.
