= In the Footsteps of Marco Polo =

- Written by: Denis Belliveau; Francis O’Donnell; Tom Casciato
- Directed by: Denis Belliveau; Francis O’Donnell
- Country of origin: United States
- Original language: English

Production
- Producers: Lisa Taylor; Tom Casciato; Josh Nathan; Stephen Segaller; Emir Lewis
- Running time: 90 minutes
- Production company: WLIW

Original release
- Network: PBS
- Release: November 16, 2008

In the Footsteps of Marco Polo is a 2008 PBS documentary film detailing Denis Belliveau and Francis O'Donnell's 1993 retracing of Marco Polo's journey from Venice to Anatolia, Persia, India and China. The movie documents the first quest "to visit and document every region Marco Polo claimed to have traveled" using only land and sea methods of transportation. Mike Hale of The New York Times writes that the documentary includes how Belliveau and O'Donnell "encountered Mongol horsemen and hostile Chinese security officers and survived a firefight between Afghan factions. In the spirit of Polo's journey -- and to prove a point regarding the authenticity of his account -- they disdained airplanes, traveling by foot, on horses and camels and by jeep, boat and train." A text by the same name as the video, In the Footsteps of Marco Polo, written by Belliveau and O'Donnell, and published by Rowman & Littlefield, serves as a companion to the documentary film. In the Footsteps of Marco Polo has been used by Belliveau to create a unique interdisciplinary educational curriculum that he presents at schools and libraries across the United States and internationally.

== Plot ==
In The Footsteps of Marco Polo begins by discussing how in the 13th century A.D., a book was written "that would change the course of history"—the author was Marco Polo, who wrote about his travels in China, Persia, Tatarstan and India. Denis Belliveau and Francis O'Donnell, of Queens, New York, sought to retrace the entire 25,000 mile route of Marco Polo, eschewing aircraft and "going only by land or sea", even making a pact to return either “dead or successful”. Their main goal was to prove the validity of Marco Polo's account by capturing images of what Polo described in his Book of the Marvels of the World, or also known as, The Travels of Marco Polo.

The pair started out in Venice, Italy and then sailed to Israel, where in Jerusalem they obtained holy oil from Church of the Holy Sepulchre, the site of Jesus' burial, during the Eastern Orthodox Christian celebration of Easter, as Marco Polo had. Belliveau and O'Donnell then sailed to Turkey, landing in Ayaş, a small fishing village, although in Polo's time it was a large port. The duo made appearances in several local newspapers, which opened up doors with the local population. Denis and Francis then tried to enter Iran but were prohibited from doing so by the Iranian government. As a result, they picked up the trail traveled by Marco Polo's father, Niccolo and his uncle Maffeo, to Bukhara, hoping to visit Iran on the way back. The Polo brothers had opened up the land route to China, known as the Silk Road years before Polo.

In Uzbekistan the two were required to have a visa for every city that they visited. Belliveau and O'Donnell, however, initially faced difficulty from the Federal Security Service (the successor of the Soviet KGB) in crossing the Friendship Bridge into Afghanistan, but were able to do so after waiting approximately three weeks, forging their visas and paying a $100 bribe. The two noticed the stark difference between this former Republic of the Soviet Union and Afghanistan—the lack of roads, goods and electricity. To get across Afghanistan, Belliveau and O'Donnell were inspired by a plan implemented by Marco Polo: Kublai Khan had provided Polo and his companions with a golden tablet or paiza on which was written that they should be given all the "lodging they might need and horses to escort them from one land to another." The American adventurers similarly received a letter from a comrade of an Afghan warlord that enabled them to obtain twenty-five heavily armed bodyguards. While traveling to Balkh, the group was ambushed and held captive by ethnic Hazaras, the direct descendants of a tribe that attacked Polo's caravan. Denis and Francis then made their way to the Wakhan Corridor in far northeastern Afghanistan. The narrow corridor has been described by the two modern explorers as being the jewel in the crown of their achievement. The leader of the Wakhi people, a living remnant of the days of feudal lords, Shah Sayid Muhammad Ishmael, told the travelers that they were the first Westerners to traverse the legendary corridor in a generation. Belliveau and O'Donnell then crossed the Pamirs into Tajikistan on horseback, passing structures made of sheep horns (ovis poli), that guided the sojourners along the snowy trails just as described by Marco Polo and dictated by local custom.

The first city that the duo encountered in China was Kashgar, where they resupplied their caravan for an arduous six week horse and camelback crossing of the Taklamakan Desert. In 1994, when they finally arrived in Dunhuang, a city in the Gansu Province, Belliveau and O’Donnell treated themselves to their first shower and hotel room after months of arduous travel. Marco Polo had written about the Reclining Buddha in Zhangye, which the pair dutifully recorded. When traveling to Mongolia, they lived in “circular houses covered in felt” called gers. They ceremoniously drank fermented mares milk called airag and partook of other various milk products used in the diet of the nomadic people residing there. The journeyers traveled throughout China visiting close to 200 places described by Polo, including Yunnan and Tibet. Finally, from Hong Kong in August 1994, they sailed on a container ship to Sumatra, where they lived with the Mentawai people and O'Donnell received a tribal tattoo, according to local tradition. They then sailed to Sri Lanka, known as Ceylon to Polo, and then at the beginning of November, they arrived in the Indian city of Madras, where they set off into the Indian subcontinent, documenting all Polo had correctly noted, including the ancient practice of astrology.

They then traveled from India to Iran, called Persia by Polo. Despite the devastating refusal of entry into Iran at the start of their journey the two adventurers were finally granted a one-month visa for entry, and told they were the first Americans to receive this freedom of passage since the 1979 Iranian Revolution. Belliveau and O'Donnell were thankful for the incredible hospitality of the people they met there.

When the duo arrived back in Venice in March 1995 they were sailed down the grand canal in a royal regatta of gondolas, landing them in St Mark's Square, where the church bells of St Mark's Basilica rang in honor of their return. At a celebratory banquet, the Venetian mayor presented them with the keys to the city and the next morning personally walked them into the Biblioteca Nazionale to view Marco Polo's last will and testament, which they had been denied access to before they left on their epic journey.

== Directors ==
- Denis Belliveau
- Francis O’Donnell

== Producers ==
- Lisa Taylor Belliveau
- Tom Casciato
- Josh Nathan
- Stephen Segaller
- Emir Lewis
