= Stephen G. Haw =

Stephen G. Haw (born 1951) is a botanical taxonomist and historian, specializing in subjects relating to China. He is the author of several published books and a large number of periodical articles. His most important work relates to the taxonomy of Tree Peonies and to the history of the Mongol Empire period in East Asia. He has made a major contribution to studies of Marco Polo's account of East Asia: according to Peter Jackson, an authority on the history of the Mongol conquests, his book about Marco Polo "must surely now have settled the controversy surrounding the historicity of Polo's visit to China."

He studied Chinese at the University of Oxford (Wadham College), and took an M.A. at the University of London. He also studied at the University of Shandong in China. His first book, The Lilies of China, was published in 1986. He subsequently authored China: A Cultural History (1991), A Traveller’s History of China (first edition 1995; several subsequent editions), Broadleaved Evergreens (2001), Marco Polo's China (2006), and Beijing – A Concise History (2007). Of these, A Traveller’s History of China has been published in translations into Finnish, Swedish and Portuguese. One reviewer wrote of this book that it "is not the perfect solution to the problem of a single source for the prospective China tourist, but it is by far the best attempt at such a book I have yet seen."

His articles have appeared in many different periodicals, including the Royal Horticultural Society's publications The Garden and The Plantsman, Hortus, Country Life, The Edinburgh Journal of Botany, and Acta Phytotaxonomica Sinica. During the last few years, several important articles relating to the history of the Mongols in China have appeared in academic journals including the Journal of the Royal Asiatic Society, East Asian History, the Bulletin of the School of Oriental and African Studies, and the Journal of Asian History.

== Publications ==
=== Books ===
- The Lilies of China, Batsford, 1986
- China: a cultural history, Batsford, 1990
- A Traveller's History of China, Windrush Press, 1995; 2nd edition, 1998; 3rd edition, Orion Books, 2002; 4th edition, 2004; published in the USA by Interlink Books, now in 5th edition; translated into Finnish as Matkaopas historiaan: Kiina; Puijo, 1996; 2nd edition, Unipress, 2005; translated into Swedish as Historisk guide till Kina; Historiska Media, 1999; translated into Portuguese as História da China; Tinta-da-China, 2008. A Traveller's History of China at Interlink Books
- Broad-leaved Evergreens: trees, shrubs and climbers, GMC Publications, 2000
- Marco Polo’s China: a Venetian in the realm of Khubilai Khan, Routledge, 2006; paperback edition, 2009. Marco Polo's China at Routledge
- Beijing – a concise history, Routledge, 2007; paperback edition, 2008. Beijing - a concise history at Routledge

=== Contributions to other books ===
- By Pen and by Spade, edited by D. Wheeler, Alan Sutton, 1990
- The Generous Garden, edited by D. Wheeler, Alan Sutton, 1991
- Plant Life, edited by D. M. Moore, Oxford University Press, 1991

=== Selected periodical articles ===
- Mudan: the king of flowers. The Garden 110: 154 – 59, (1985).
- Pasque flowers. The Garden 111, 165 – 68 (1986).
- A problem of peonies. The Garden 111: 326 – 68 (1986).
- The origins of the garden chrysanthemum. The Garden 111, 525 – 28 (1986).
- Chinese flowering plums and cherries. The Garden 112, 224 – 78 (1987).
- Asian Bellflowers. The Garden 112, 567 – 69 (1987).
- Bamboo comes west. The Garden 113, 557 – 61 (1988).
- A thousand petals. Country Life May 17, 1990: 188 –89 (1990).
- A review of the infraspecific taxa of Paeonia suffruticosa Andrews. Edinburgh Journal of Botany 47 (3): 273 – 81 (1990) [co-authored with L. A. Lauener].
- Tree Peonies: A Problem Resolved. The Plantsman 13: 94 – 97 (1991).
- Paeonia ostii in Britain. The New Plantsman 7: 160 – 63 (2000).
- Tree Peonies, a Review of their History and Taxonomy. The New Plantsman 8: 156 - 71 (2001).
- Paeonia delavayi, a variable species. The New Plantsman 8: 251 – 53 (2001).
- Tree peonies - a review of recent literature. The Plantsman New Series 5: 88 – 92; 258 – 60 (2006).
- The Mongol Empire – the first gunpowder empire? Journal of the Royal Asiatic Society 23.3: 441 – 469 (2013).
- Cathayan Arrows and Meteors: The Origins of Chinese Rocketry. Journal of Chinese Military History 2: 28 – 42 (2013).
- The Deaths of Two Khaghans: a comparison of events in 1242 and 1260. Bulletin of the School of Oriental and African Studies 76.3: 361 – 71 (2013).
- Bayan of the Bārin’s Persian Wife, And Other Perplexities. Journal of Asian History, 48.2: 263 – 79 (2014).
- The Mongol Conquest of Tibet. Journal of the Royal Asiatic Society 24.1: 37 – 49 (2014).
- The Persian Language in Yuan-dynasty China: A Reappraisal. East Asian History 39: 5 – 32 (2014).
- The History of a Loyal Heart (Xin shi): a late-Ming forgery. Journal of the Royal Asiatic Society 25.2: 317 - 325 (2015).
- The Semu ren in the Yuan Empire. Ming Qing Yanjiu 18: 39 - 63 (2014).
- The Maritime Routes between China and the Indian Ocean during the second to ninth centuries CE. Journal of the Royal Asiatic Society 27.1: 53 - 81 (2017).
- Cinnamon, Cassia and Ancient Trade. Journal of Ancient History and Archaeology 4.1: 5 - 18 (2017).
- Tung Oil and Tong Trees. Zeitschrift der Deutschen Morgenländischen Gesellschaft 167.1: 215 - 236 (2017).
- Islam in Champa and the Making of Factitious History. Journal of the Royal Asiatic Society 28.4: 717 - 747 (2018).
- The Mystery of Jasmine and the Arab Counting-House in Canton. Zeitschrift der Deutschen Morgenländischen Gesellschaft 168.2: 415 - 436 (2018).
