= Peter Jackson (historian) =

British historian

Peter Jackson FBA is a British scholar and historian, specializing in the Crusades, particularly the contacts between the Europeans and the Mongols as well as medieval Muslim India. He is Emeritus Professor of Medieval History at Keele University and editor of The Cambridge History of Iran: The Timurid and Safavid Periods.

His main research interests are on the relations between the Mongols and the Latin West between 1220 and 1410, and he has written extensively on the topic, exploring the concepts of medieval Europe, the Crusades, medieval Russia and the Mongols, especially the clash of cultures, and the interconnectedness of legends such as that of Prester John.

== Academic career ==
Graduating from St John's College, Cambridge, in 1971, he was awarded a PhD from Cambridge in 1977 for the thesis "The Mongols and India, 1221–1351". In 1979 he was appointed lecturer in history at Keele University, becoming a senior lecturer in 1991. He was awarded a personal chair in medieval history in 2002.

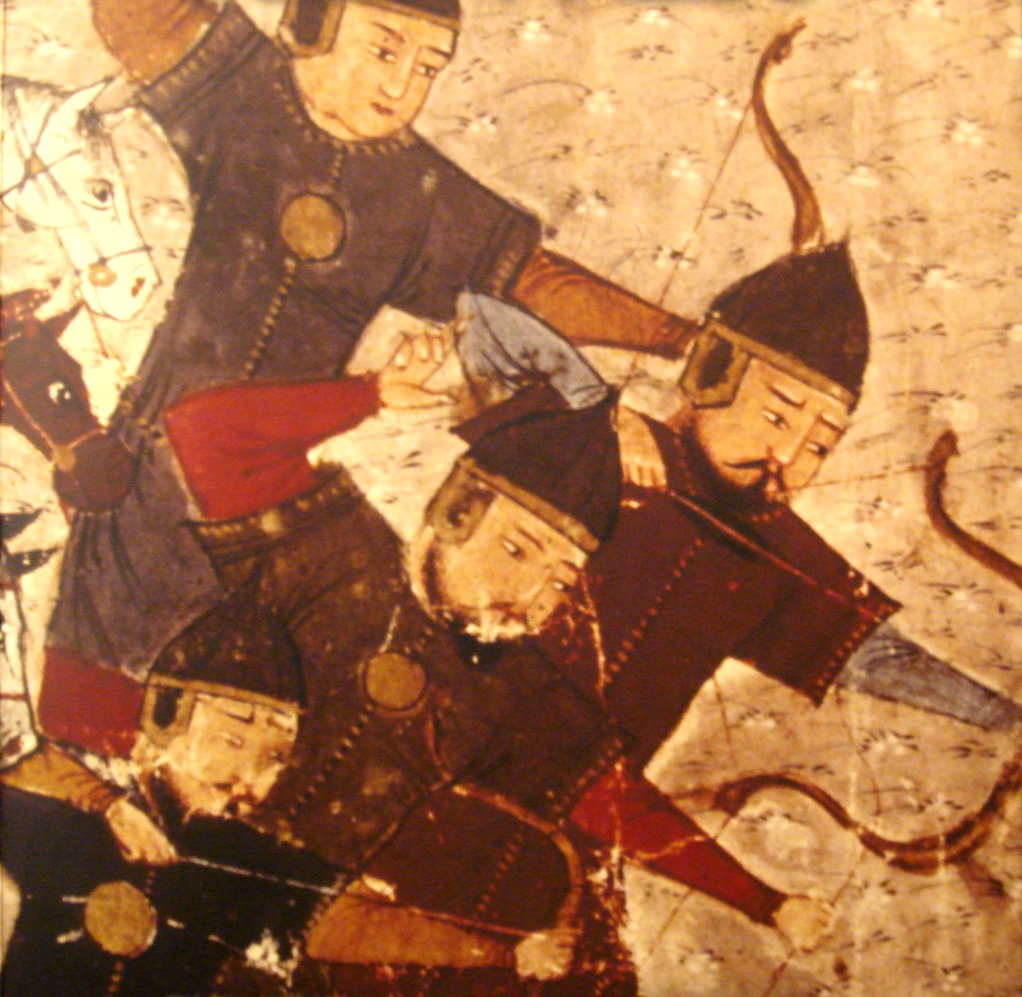
Mongol archers in Compendium of Chronicles of Rashiduldin Hamadani (BnF. MS. Supplément Persan 1113. 1430-1434 AD). Depicted on cover of Mongols and the West by Peter Jackson

== Research ==
His 1999 book The Delhi Sultanate was described by a reviewer as amongst the most distinguished works on the medieval Islamic world in our time and was scheduled for translation into Arabic. In this book, the geographical extent of his scholarship, his linguistic skills, and his extensive knowledge of medieval Islamic geography enabled him to compress into a single volume a nuanced assessment which was rooted in close textual analysis and a mastery of the linguistic problems presented by his sources, reminiscent of the research of Simon Digby. His latest book on the Mongols and the Islamic World has been described as a work of great erudition which demonstrates Peter Jackson's life-long understanding of both the Muslim and the European sources for the history of the Mongols.

Jackson also held a Leverhulme Major Research Fellowship. In 2011 he retired as Professor Emeritus, and was elected a Fellow of the British Academy in 2012.

== Books ==
- The Fall of the Ghurid Dynasty (chapter) in "Studies in Honour of Clifford Edmund Bosworth, Volume II", Brill 1998, ISBN 978-90-04-49199-1.
- The Delhi Sultanate: A Political and Military History. Cambridge University Press. 1999. ISBN 9780521543293.
- The Mongols and the West, 1221-1410. Longman. 2005. ISBN 0582368960.
- The Seventh Crusade, 1244-54: Sources and Documents. Ashgate (Crusade Texts in Translation). 2007. ISBN 9780754657224.
- Studies on the Mongol Empire and Early Muslim India. Ashgate (Variorum Collected Studies Series). 2009. ISBN 9780754659884.
- The Mongols and the Islamic World. Yale University Press. 2017. ISBN 9780300125337.
- From Genghis Khan to Tamerlane: The Reawakening of Mongol Asia. 2024. Yale University Press. ISBN 9780300275049.

Translator of

- Friar William of Rubruck (1990). Peter Jackson; David Morgan (eds.). The Mission of Friar William of Rubruck: His Journey to the Court of the Great Khan Mongke, 1253-1255. Hakluyt Society. ISBN 0-904180-29-8.

=== Books edited ===
- "The Cambridge History of Iran, Volume 6 — The Timurid and Safavid Periods", Cambridge University Press 1986, ISBN 978-0-521-20094-3
