= David O. Morgan =

British historian and academic (1945–2019)

David O. Morgan (1945–2019) was a British historian who was professor emeritus of history at the University of Wisconsin–Madison. His book The Mongols is considered a standard in the field. Originally published in 1986, a new expanded edition was published in 2007.

Morgan wrote several books on Medieval history, particularly the subject of the Mongol Empire. His previous functions involved being a reader in the history of the Middle East at the School of Oriental and African Studies, London. He held a BA from the University of Oxford and an MA and PhD from the University of London.

Morgan died on October 23, 2019.

== Bibliography ==
- The Mongols, Blackwell Publishing, 2007, ISBN 1-4051-3539-5
- Medieval Persia, 1040-1797, second edition published 2016 by Routledge. ISBN 978-1-138-88566-0
