= Dalibor Grubačević =

Croatian composer, musician, and producer (born 1975)

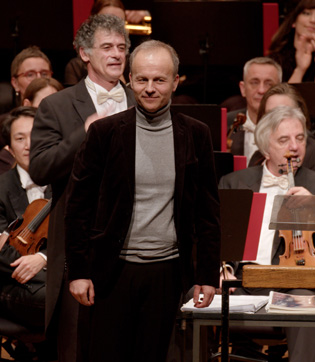
- Dalibor Grubačević in 2023

Background information
- Born: January 9, 1975 (age 51); Koprivnica, SR Croatia, SFR Yugoslavia
- Genres: Film score, contemporary classical music, pop, rock
- Occupations: Composer, musician, arranger, music producer
- Years active: 1990–present
- Labels: Croatia Records, Aquarius Records, HRT
- Website: daliborgrubacevic.com

Dalibor Grubačević (Croatian pronunciation: [ˈdalibo:r gruba:t͡ʃevit͡ɕ]; born January 9, 1975) is a Croatian composer, musician and record producer. His work includes film scores and contemporary classical music, often utilizing traditional orchestration combined with modern production techniques. In 2024, he was nominated for the Camille Award for Best Film Score for the war drama The Conversation. He has composed soundtracks for international films starring Academy Award winner Jeremy Irons, Academy Award nominee Tim Roth, as well as Armand Assante and Franco Nero.

== Biography ==
Dalibor Grubačević was born in Koprivnica (modern-day Croatia), where he grew up and completed his early education. Already as a young boy, he presented an exceptional musical talent and at the age of six he started learning to play guitar and piano. Later on, as a member of the local cultural and artistic society 'Koprivnica', he also learned to play the tamburica. In the 1990s he became increasingly attracted to rock 'n' roll and inspired by The Beatles he became a member of the pop-rock band 'The Bugs'. He then continued his musical education and journey of musical discovery by studying classical music forms and works of composers of classical music, attending private lessons with prof. Natalija Imbrišak. In 1993, he began studying Social Work at the Faculty of Law in Zagreb, however two years later he interrupted his studies in order to fully dedicate himself to music.

To date, he collaborated with many prominent Croatian directors, such as Branko Ištvančić (The Ghost in the Swamp, The Bridge at the End of the World), Andrej Korovljev (Hotel Pula), Miro Branković (In Search of Marko Polo), Nenad Puhovski (Together), Dominik Sedlar (The Conversation) and others, for whose films he composed music. Whilst composing film music, Grubačević very successfully combines a variety of musical genres and classical orchestration with electronic sounds and instruments.

In addition to scores and soundtracks for feature films and documentaries, as well as various advertising films, Grubačević as a musician is equally successful in the fields of pop, rock and ethno music. Apart from in Croatia, his compositions and musical arrangements have been performed in Macedonia, Montenegro, Canada, America, Japan, England, Italy, Israel and Georgia. He has worked and collaborated with many Croatian and foreign composers, musicians and music producers, for example, Eric Ewazen, Alan Holley, Zagreb Soloists, Zagreb Philharmonic Orchestra, Simply Brass Quintet, Miroslav Evačić and Zoran Džorlev as well as with singers Toše Proeski, Sasa Lozar, Aleksandar Mitevski, Daniel Kajmakoski, and pop-rock band Pavel.

Dalibor Grubačević is a member of the Croatian Composers' Society and the Croatian Freelance Artists Association.

== Works (selection) ==
=== Compositions ===
- Rondo for string orchestra (2002)
- Jesenji valcer (Autumn Waltz) for tamburica orchestra (2005)
- Ricordi del passato for strings quartet (2010)
- Dvije rijeke (Two Rivers) for brass quintet (2010), inspired by the two great Croatian rivers Drava and Mura, dedicated to and premiered by Simply Brass Quintet
- Solid Pictures for French horn and piano (2014)
- Valse balkanique (Balkan waltz) for brass quintet (2018)
- Concerto for tuba and orchestra (2021)
- Csárdás suite for strings (2021)
- Diptych for tuba quartet (2023)
- Four Scapes for woodwind ensemble (2024)

== Film scores ==
=== Feature films ===
- 2006 – Duh u močvari (The Ghost in the Swamp), feature film, directed by: Branko Ištvančić, HRT & Interfilm d.o.o.
- 2014 – Most na kraju svijeta (The Bridge at the End of the World), feature film, director: Branko Ištvančić, Artizana film d.o.o. & HRT
- 2016 – Zbog tebe (Because of You), feature film, director: Anđelo Jurkas, B produkcija, DOP Produkcija
- 2017 – Fuck off I Love You, feature film, director: Anđelo Jurkas, B produkcija, DOP Produkcija
- 2021 - The Match, feature film, director: Dominik and Jakov Sedlar, Ollendorff center, Oluja film, Mutiny Pictures
- 2022 - The Conversation, feature film, director: Dominik Sedlar, Quiet Storm Productions, Croatia Film
- 2023 - Hotel Pula, feature film, director: Andrej Korovljev, Kinematograf, HRT
- 2024 - Cat's Cry (Mačji krik), feature film, director: Sanja Živković, Nova film, Artizana film d.o.o., YN Films
- 2025 - 260 Days, feature film, director: Jakov Sedlar, 260 Days, Arramis Films, Croatia Film
- 2026 - The Crystal Planet, animated feature, director: Arsen Anton Ostojić, Filmosaurus rex, Alkay Animation Prague

=== Documentaries ===
- 2005 – Izgubljeno blago (The Lost Treasure), documentary, director: Branko Ištvančić, HRT
- 2007 – Tesla, documentary, director: Miro Branković, HRT
- 2009 – Zajedno (Together), documentary, director: Nenad Puhovski, Factum d.o.o.
- 2010 – Zaustavljeni glas (Silenced voice), documentary, director: Višnja Starešina, HRT & Interfilm d.o.o.
- 2011 – Album, documentary, director: Branko Ištvančić, Factum d.o.o.
- 2012/2013 – Hrvatsko vodeno blago (Aquatic treasures of Croatia), documentary TV series, director: Miro Andrić, HRT & Car-Herc d.o.o.
- 2013 – Slavoljub Penkala – documentary, director: Milka Barišić, HRT
- 2013 – U potrazi za Markom Polom (In Search of Marco Polo), documentary TV miniseries, director: Miro Branković, HRT
- 2014 – Dragi Lastane! (Dear Lastan!), documentary, director: Irena Škorić, Artizana film d.o.o.
- 2018 - Više od riječi (More than Words), TV series, director: Miro Branković, HRT
- 2020 - Rivers of Croatia, documentary, director: Goran Šafarek, Šafarek produkcija, 3BoxMedia
- 2021 - The Cars We Drove Into Capitalism, documentary, directors: Boris Missirkov, Georgi Bogdanov, Agitprop

== Discography ==
=== Albums ===
- 2006 – Duh u močvari (The Ghost in the Swamp – original motion picture soundtrack), Croatia Records, CD 5695899
- 2011 – artEdox – Film music, Aquarius Records, CD 377–11
- 2012 – U potrazi za Markom Polom (In search of Marco Polo) (music from TV miniseries), Aquarius Records, CD 467–12
- 2015 – Most na kraju svijeta (The Bridge at the End of the World) (original motion picture soundtrack), Aquarius Records, CD 9841093
- 2021 – Dalibor Grubačević performed by the Zagreb Soloists (Live at Tuškanac Summer Stage), Aquarius Records, LP 18-21
- 2021 – The Match (Original Motion Picture Soundtrack), Plaza Mayor Company Ltd., SERG300
- 2022 – The Conversation (Original Motion Picture Soundtrack, Plaza Mayor Company Ltd., SERG323
- 2023 – Rivers of Croatia (Original Music from the Documentary Film), Plaza Mayor Company Ltd., 197188057565
- 2023 – The Cars We Drove into Capitalism (Original Motion Picture Soundtrack), MovieScore Media, RB03002
- 2024 – Musical Gravities, Cantus Records, 88924507039

=== Production ===
- 2007 – CD Fulmination / Miroslav Evačić & Čardaš Blues Band, Croatia Records, CD 5751410
- 2010 – CD Camminate / Simply Brass, Cantus Records, CD 98898492102
- 2019 – CD Serbus! / Zagrebački orkestar ZET-a, ZET CD001
- 2019 – CD Signali / Hrvoje Pintarić, Tamara Jurkić Sviben, Cantus Records, CD 88924501542

== Awards ==
- 2010 – Award for best music in a documentary film Together by director Nenad Puhovski at the 19th 'Days of Croatian Film'
- 2013 – Discography Award 'Porin' in the category for the Best album of original music for theatre, film and /or TV (for the album In Search of Marko Polo)
- 2016 – Award for best music in a documentary film It Was Just a Good Dream by director Branko Istvancic at the 7th 'Religious Film Festival' - Trsat (Croatia)
- 2022 – Silver Medal / Outstanding Achievement in the category Film Soundtrack and Album for the music from the film The Match, at the Global Music Awards competition - USA
- 2022 – Crystal Pine Award for best music in a feature film The Conversation directed by Dominik Sedlar at the 10th 'International sound & film music festival' - ISFMF 2022
