= Adrian Bouchet =

English actor (born 1974)

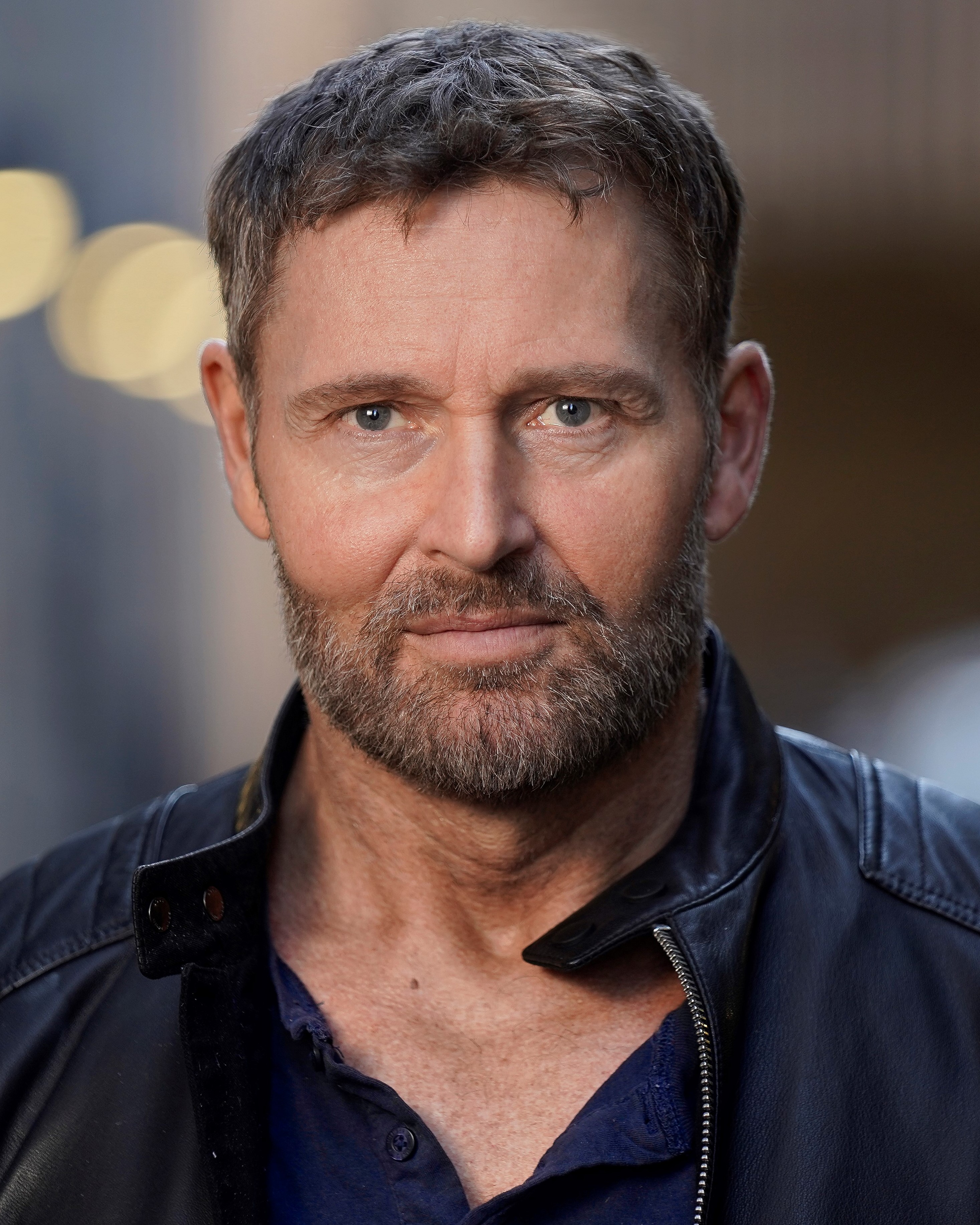
- Adrian Bouchet in 2022
- Born: Rhodesia
- Occupation: Actor
- Years active: 1998–present

Adrian Bouchet, sometimes credited as Mark Stevens, (born 1974) is an English actor and presenter, most widely known for playing the role of Steapa in the BBC and Netflix TV series, The Last Kingdom (2017–2020).

== Early life ==
Bouchet was born in Rhodesia and left during the Rhodesian Bush War to settle in the United Kingdom. He is a graduate of Birmingham University. He attended Birmingham School of Acting. He began acting in television productions in the late 1990s. In 1998 he appeared in an episode of the television series Dangerfield. In the next few years he was able to establish himself as an actor as an episode actor in series and as a supporting actor in film productions.

== Career ==
In 2010, Bouchet was cast as Marc Antony in the "Cleopatra" episode of Mystery Files and also as Riothamus in the "King Arthur" episode of the same series. In 2011, he received the Best Actor International award at the 2011 International Film Festival for his performance in the film A Brunette Kiss opposite Bridie Latona. In 2012, he had the role of Brett in the action film Interview with a Hitman. In 2014, he played an unnamed knight in the film Morning Star who wants to give the bones of his friend who died in battle to his family. In 2014, he was Robert the Bruce in the feature film Battle of Kings: Bannockburn. In the same year he played a US Army sergeant opposite Matt Damon and George Clooney in The Monuments Men directed by Clooney. In 2015, he portrayed the role of Lucan in the film Arthur and Merlin. Two years later, he was cast in King Arthur: Legend of the Sword again in a film that was Arthurian Legend themed. In 2016, he portrayed the role of Judah Ben Hur in The Asylum-film In the Name of Ben Hur. From 2017 to 2020, Bouchet played Steapa, King Alfred's Captain of the Guard, in 21 episodes of The Last Kingdom. In 2019, he portrayed the role of Billy Ford in the film Monster Island. In 2021, he also played the Holy Roman Emperor Frederick I, known as Frederick Barbarossa, in seven episodes of the medieval Spanish TV series Glow and Darkness with Jayne Seymour and Joan Collins.

== Filmography ==
=== Film ===
Year	Title	Role	Notes
2000	The Waiting	Turner	
2002	9 Dead Gay Guys	The Gigolo	Uncredited
2004	Chasing Liberty	Gus Gus	
2004	Alien vs. Predator	Sven	
2005	Good Service		as Mark Stevens
2005	All About Anna	Johan	as Mark Stevens
2009	Idol of Evil	Nixon	
2010	Clash of the Titans	Soldier (Zeus Statue)	
2011	The Veteran	Chechen 1	
2012	From This Day	Capt. Knowles	
2012	Interview with a Hitman	Brett	
2012	The Seasoning House	Branko	
2012	Battle Brigade	Chase	
2013	Fedz	Ian	
2013	The Sky in Bloom	Roger Leibnitz	
2013	The Flight of the Flamingo	Ronnie	
2014	The Monuments Men	Sarge Near Altaussee	
2014	Olive Green	Yuri	
2014	Eve	Lt. Edwards	
2014	Morning Star	Man	
2014	The Crypt	Samuel	
2015	Je suis daddy	Butcher	
2015	Awaiting	Joe	
2015	Arthur and Merlin	Lucan	
2015	Chicken	Bill	
2015	Art Ache	Sean	
2016	The Fall of the Krays	Frank	
2016	In the Name of Ben Hur	Judah Ben Hur	
2016	The Comedian's Guide to Survival	Fox and Hounds Landlord	
2017	The Hippopotamus	Marcus Andronicus	
2017	King Arthur: Legend of the Sword	Baron 3	
2017	Knights of the Damned	James	
2018	1945: From This Day	Capt. Knowles	
2018	Dragon Kingdom	James	
2020	Glamour	Davis	
2020	Cupid	Principal Harper	
2021	HellKat	The Bar Keep	
2022	A Fistful of Karma	Val	
2023	Mission: Impossible – Dead Reckoning Part One	Weapons Officer	
TBA	260 Days	Uros	In production

=== Television ===
Year	Title	Role	Notes
1998	Dangerfield	Michael	Episode: "Angel"
2002	Coronation Street	Croupier	1 episode
2003	Manchild	Squash Player	Episode #2.6
2004	Journey to the Centre of the Earth	Hans	Television film
2010	Mystery Files	Marc Antony / Riothamus	2 episodes
2012	Silent Witness	James Wade	2 episodes
2012	Red Dwarf	Centurion (uncredited)	Episode: "Lemons"
2014	Battle of Kings: Bannockburn	Robert the Bruce	Television film
2017–2020	The Last Kingdom	Steapa	21 episodes
2018	Strike Back	Johannes Krieger	Episode: "Retribution: Part 7"
2019	Monster Island	Billy Ford	Television film
2021	Quentin Quarantine	Mr. Quentin Quarantine	Episode: "The Principal"
2021	Glow & Darkness	Barbarossa	8 episodes
2023	The Wheel of Time	Artur Hawkwing	Episode: "What Was Meant to Be"
2024	Those About to Die	Porto	10 episodes

=== Video Games ===
Year	Title	Role	Notes
2025	Kingdom Come: Deliverance II	Jan Žižka	Also appeared as himself in promotional videos

== Stage ==
- A Midsummer Night's Dream (Folksy Theatre)
- On the Piste (Oldham Coliseum Theatre)
- Troilus & Cressida (Theatr Clwyd)
- Don't Dress For Dinner (The English Theatre of Hamburg)
- On the Piste (Hull Truck)
- The Bridge (Mouthpiece Theatre)
- Romeo & Juliet (Fleighton Productions)
- Alfred & the Burned Buns (Theatre West)
- Macbeth (C'est Tous Theatre)
- Twelfth Night (Now and Then Productions)
- Pink For A Boy (Space Theatre)
- Cinder Eddie & the Sleeping (Space Theatre)
- The Vital Spark (Wet Arts Theatre)
- Death & the Maiden (C'est Tous Theatre)
- Romeo & Juliet (C'est Tous Theatre)
- As You like It (Cambridge Shakespeare Festival)
- Twelfth Night (Cambridge Shakespeare Festival)
