= Monster Island =

Monster Island may refer to:

== Film ==
- Monster Island (2004 film), a television film
- Monster Island (2017 film), an animated film produced by Ánima Estudios
- Monster Island (2019 film), an action film by Mark Atkins
- Orang Ikan, also known as Monster Island, a 2024 horror film

== Games ==
- Monster Island (play-by-mail game), a play-by-mail game active from the 1980s to the 2000s
- Monster Islands, a fictional planet in LittleBigPlanet Karting

== Literature ==
- Monster Island (Buffy/Angel novel), a 2003 novel by Christopher Golden and Thomas E. Sniegoski
- Monster Island (Wellington novel), a 2004 novel by David Wellington
- Monster Isle, the Mole Man's base in the Marvel Comics canon
