= Mystery Files =

Mystery Files may refer to:

- Mystery Files (British TV series), a 2010 National Geographic series
- Mystery Files (Hong Kong TV series), a 1997 Hong Kong science fiction thriller television series
