= Logie Awards of 1999 =

41st Logie Awards
- Date: 11 April 1999
- Site: Crown Palladium, Melbourne, Victoria
- Hosted by: Andrew Denton

Highlights
- Gold Logie: Lisa McCune
- Hall of Fame: Mike Walsh
- Most awards: Blue Heelers (4)
- Most nominations: Blue Heelers (8)

Television coverage
- Network: Nine Network

The 41st Annual TV Week Logie Awards was held on Sunday 11 April 1999 at the Crown Palladium in Melbourne, and broadcast on the Nine Network. The ceremony was hosted by Andrew Denton, and guests included Isaac Hayes, Kevin Sorbo, Kathy Griffin, Portia De Rossi and Trudie Goodwin.

== Winners and nominees ==
In the tables below, winners are listed first and highlighted in bold.

=== Gold Logie ===
Most Popular Personality on Australian Television
- **Lisa McCune in Blue Heelers (Seven Network)**
  - Belinda Emmett in Home and Away (Seven Network)
  - Kerri-Anne Kennerley in Midday with Kerri-Anne (Nine Network)
  - Georgie Parker in All Saints (Seven Network)
  - John Wood in Blue Heelers (Seven Network)

=== Acting/Presenting ===
Most Popular Actor	Most Popular Actress
**Martin Sacks in Blue Heelers (Seven Network)**; Colin Friels in Water Rats (Nine Network); Jesse Spencer in Neighbours (Network Ten); John Wood in Blue Heelers (Seven Network)	**Lisa McCune in Blue Heelers (Seven Network)**; Belinda Emmett in Home and Away (Seven Network); Rebecca Gibney in Halifax f.p. (Nine Network); Georgie Parker in All Saints (Seven Network)
Most Outstanding Actor in a Series	Most Outstanding Actress in a Series
**Tony Martin in Wildside (ABC TV) and David Wenham in SeaChange (ABC TV)**; Colin Friels in Water Rats (Nine Network); Paul Mercurio in The Day of the Roses (Network Ten); Jeremy Sims in Aftershocks (SBS TV)	**Sigrid Thornton in SeaChange (ABC TV)**; Rachael Blake in Wildside (ABC TV); Rebecca Gibney in Halifax f.p: Afraid of the Dark (Nine Network) and The Day of the Roses (Network Ten); Caroline Goodall in A Difficult Woman; Claudia Karvan in The Violent Earth
Most Popular New Male Talent	Most Popular New Female Talent
**Daniel MacPherson in Neighbours (Network Ten)**; Paul Bishop in Blue Heelers (Seven Network); Troy Dann in Outback Adventures with Troy Dann (Seven Network); Graeme Squires in Home and Away (Seven Network)	**Kimberley Cooper in Home and Away (Seven Network)**; Bec Cartwright in Home and Away (Seven Network); Libby Tanner in All Saints (Seven Network); Dr. Katrina Warren in Harry's Practice (Seven Network)
Most Outstanding Sports Broadcaster	Most Outstanding News/Public Affairs Broadcaster
**Bruce McAvaney (Seven Network)**; Richie Benaud (Nine Network); Les Murray (SBS TV); John Tapp (Network Ten)	**Maxine McKew (ABC TV)**; Ray Martin (Nine Network); Chris Masters (ABC TV); Kerry O'Brien (ABC TV)

=== Most Popular Programs ===
Most Popular Program	Most Popular Light Entertainment Program
**Blue Heelers (Seven Network)**; All Saints (Seven Network); Home and Away (Seven Network); Water Rats (Nine Network)	**Hey Hey It's Saturday (Nine Network)**; Battle of the Sexes (Network Ten); Midday with Kerri-Anne (Nine Network); The Panel (Network Ten)
Most Popular Comedy Program	Most Popular Lifestyle Program
**Hey Hey It's Saturday (Nine Network)**; Good News Week (ABC TV); The Panel (Network Ten); Totally Full Frontal (Network Ten)	**Better Homes and Gardens (Seven Network)**; Animal Hospital (Nine Network); Burke's Backyard (Nine Network); Getaway (Nine Network)

=== Most Outstanding Programs ===
Most Outstanding Drama Series	Most Outstanding Miniseries/Telemovie
**SeaChange (ABC TV)**; Blue Heelers (Seven Network); Water Rats (Nine Network); Wildside (ABC TV)	**The Day of the Roses (Network Ten)**; A Difficult Woman; Aftershocks (SBS TV); Halifax f.p: Afraid of the Dark (Nine Network)
Most Outstanding Sports Program	Most Outstanding Public Affairs Program
**1998 Commonwealth Games (Nine Network)**; 1998 Melbourne Cup Carnival (Network Ten); 1998 World Cup (SBS TV); 1998 Swimming Championships (Nine Network)	**"Balibo Five", Foreign Correspondent (ABC TV)**; "Dancing with Strangers", Australian Story (ABC TV); 60 Minutes (Nine Network); Sunday (Nine Network)
Most Outstanding Documentary	Most Outstanding News Coverage
**Miracle at Sea: The Rescue of Tony Bullimore (ABC TV)**; Afrika: Cape Town to Cairo (ABC TV); Exile In Sarajevo (SBS TV); Rite of Passage (SBS TV)	**"Indonesia Crisis", ABC News (ABC TV)**; "Papua New Guinea Tidal Wave", National Nine News (Nine Network); "Linton Bushfires (Victoria)", Seven Nightly News (Seven Network); "The Waterfront Dispute", National Nine News (Nine Network)

== Performers ==
- Isaac Hayes
- Deborah Conway

== Hall of Fame ==
After a lifetime in Australian television, Mike Walsh became the 16th inductee into the TV Week Logies Hall of Fame.
