= Chris Sadrinna =

Australian actor (born 1975)

- Born: 26 February 1975 (age 51); Sydney, New South Wales, Australia
- Occupation: Actor
- Years active: 1996–current
- Known for: Home and Away; Underbelly: A Tale of Two Cities; Garage Days

Chris Sadrinna (born 26 February 1975) is an Australian actor, known for Home and Away, Underbelly: A Tale of Two Cities and Garage Days.

== Career ==
=== Television ===
During 2006 and 2007, Sadrinna had a recurring role as Brad Armstrong in long-running soap opera Home and Away, playing the fiancée of Kate Ritchie's character Sally Fletcher. In 2009, he played a drug dealer named Greg Ollard in Underbelly: A Tale of Two Cities, the second season of underworld crime series Underbelly.

Sadrinna has had guest roles in other television series including high school drama Heartbreak High, police procedural series Blue Heelers and Water Rats and medical drama All Saints.

=== Film ===
Sadrinna had a small role alongside Martin Henderson and Paul Mercurio in the 1999 dance drama film Kick. In 2002, he played Lucy in the comedy-drama film Garage Days, alongside Kick Gurry and his fellow cast member in Home and Away, Holly Brisley. That same year, he played Sean in Ivan Sen's debut feature film Beneath Clouds.

In 2009, Sadrinna played Van Mier in American superhero film X-Men Origins: Wolverine, alongside fellow Australian, Hugh Jackman. That same year, he starred as the villain in Australian independent thriller film Bad Bush.

== Filmography ==
=== Film ===
Year	Title	Role	Type
1998	Thump	Peter	Short film
1998	Ivan	Ivan	Short film
1999	Kick	Smithy	Feature film
1999	First Daughter	Eric Nelson	TV movie
1999	Monster!	Larry	TV movie
2002	Beneath Clouds	Sean	Feature film
2002	Garage Days	Lucy	Feature film
2009	X-Men Origins: Wolverine	Van Mier	Feature film
2009	Bad Bush	Weaver	Feature film
2017	Hitler Lives!	Dorff	Feature film
2022	Beat	Dealer, Rick	Feature film

=== Television ===
Year	Title	Role	Type
1996	Blue Heelers	Scott Osbourne	TV series, season 3, episode 23: "The Principle of the Thing"
1996; 1997	Heartbreak High	Andre / Nerd	TV series, 2 episodes
1999; 2000	BeastMaster	Jem / Paj	TV series, 2 episodes
2000	Water Rats	Derek Van Hargaan	TV series, season 5, episode 18: "One Good Turn"
2000	All Saints	David	TV series, season 3, episode 29: "One for the Road"
2006–2007	Home and Away	Brad Armstrong	TV series, 198 episodes
2009	Underbelly	Greg Ollard	TV series, 3 episodes
