= Bad Bush =

- Directed by: Samuel Genocchio
- Written by: Samuel Genocchio
- Produced by: Samuel Genocchio, Tom Kennedy, Mark Tesoriero
- Starring: Chris Sadrinna; Jeremy Lindsay Taylor; Viva Bianca; Malcolm Kennard
- Cinematography: Paul Howard
- Edited by: Andreas Gruber
- Music by: Veren Grigorov
- Release date: 7 May 2009 (Australia)
- Running time: 82 minutes
- Country: Australia
- Language: English

Bad Bush is a 2009 Australian psychological thriller film. Starring Chris Sadrinna from television soap Home and Away and Jeremy Lindsay Taylor from Sea Patrol and featuring Viva Bianca from Spartacus: Blood and Sand in her debut feature film, the film is based on the real-life story centred on a young woman with her baby alone with a crazed man on a property.

The film was mostly made at Mangrove Mountain and Somersby on the Central Coast, New South Wales. Appropximately 100 students from The Entrance High School worked on the film behind the scenes. Bad Bush premièred at the Avoca Beach Picture Theatre on 7 May 2009.

== Cast ==
- Chris Sadrinna as Weaver
- Jeremy Lindsay Taylor as Turps
- Viva Bianca as Ophelia
- Malcolm Kennard as Mal

== Box office ==
Bad Bush grossed $8,961 at the box office in Australia.
