= Mercurio's Menu =

- Mercurio's Menu logo
- Presented by: Paul Mercurio
- Country of origin: Australia
- No. of seasons: 4
- No. of episodes: 52

Production
- Running time: Approx 30 minutes (including commercials)

Original release
- Network: Seven Network
- Release: 2008 – 2011

Mercurio's Menu is an Australian television cooking show hosted by Paul Mercurio. The series follows Paul as he travels to different regions of Australia and highlights the region's local cuisines, as well as talk to local chefs. It is produced by WTFN and airs on Channel Seven and a number of other stations in Australia and New Zealand. It is also shown on the Australian Network which beams out to more than 44 countries across Asia, the Pacific and Indian subcontinent. It has also been sold to various countries including Israel, Spain and others.

== History ==
The program first premiered in February 2008, and aired in most regions of Australia at 5:30 pm on Sundays. The second season premiered on 14 February 2009 at 5:30 pm on Channel Seven. The third season began on 11 April 2010. The fourth series started in NSW in May 2011. A special one-hour episode filmed in Kenya and featuring the Koricho Tea fields was screened nationally on Saturday 28 May 2011.

== Dishes ==
Mercurio's Menu has led to the development of a number of original dishes, many of them evidently masterminded by Mercurio himself. These include "Pasodoble Pizza Pockets", "Strictly Stroganoff", "Mercurio Muffins" and "Failure Pie With 90s Throwback Sauce".

None of the recipes in Mercurio's Menu cook book have names such as those suggested above. The recipes from series 1, 2 and 3 can be found on Lifestyle network.

== Availability ==
Mercurio's Menu can be seen on various television stations. In Australia, it airs at 5.30 pm every Sunday on Channel Seven and most of its regional affiliate stations, such as Prime and Southern Cross. Some stations air the show at a different times due to sports coverage commitments – for instance the show is aired in Victoria at 5.30pm on a Saturday. The show also airs on 7Two every Saturday at 9pm.

In New Zealand, the show airs on weekday afternoons on subscription channel Food Television.

Series one, two and three aired on Foxtel in Australia in August 2011.

== Episodes ==
Series One – 2008

Episode 1 – Gold Coast

Episode 2 – Townsville

First airing on 17 May 2008, this episode featured stories from Townsville and Magnetic Island. Paul visited The Watermark and Aquarius on the Beach in Townsville before boarding SunFerries to travel to Magnetic Island. Whilst on Magnetic Island, Paul visited Moke Magnetic and Barefoot Art Food Wine. With the help of executive chef Sean Calliste, Paul created a prawn, avocado and bocconcini pizza. Also featured in this episode is Meg Coffey. Other features of this episode include barramundi, ice cream, prawns, beer, sugarcane and Paul's Great Walk for Cancer.

Series Two – 2009

Series Three – 2010

Series Four – 2011
