= Kirk Barker =

English actor (born 1983)

- Born: 1983 (age 42–43)
- Occupation: Actor
- Years active: 2009–present
- Relatives: Paul Barker

Kirk Barker (born 26 April 1983) is an English actor.

Beginning his career in stage productions of pantomime, Shakespeare, and musical theatre, he moved on to television work and finally to leading roles in feature films.

== Life ==
Barker grew up in the Calder Valley, attending Stubbings Infant School and Riverside Junior School in Hebden Bridge and then Calder High School, where he got interested in acting. After leaving school, he was a windsurfing instructor in the summer months and worked in ski chalets in the winter. In his twenties he renewed an interest in acting and musical theatre, beginning to appear in professional stage productions. In 2008 he was Dandini in Cinderella, in 2009 he played Macduff in a Julian Chenery touring production of Macbeth, and in 2010 was Elrond in a tour of The Hobbit directed by Roy Marsden. In 2011 he sang in a travelling production of Footloose by Karen Bruce. In 2012 he had his first screen roles, before spending the second half of the year touring North America in Batman Live. The next year, he secured a regular part in the HBO television series The Girls' Guide to Depravity. In 2015 he starred in the film Arthur and Merlin and later the same year starred opposite Viva Bianca in A Prince for Christmas.

== Filmography ==
Year	Title	Role	Notes
2012	Bloody Tales of the Tower	Mark Smeaton	One episode
2012	Tír na nÓg	Oisin	Short film
2012	The Secret Life of...	Alexander the Great	One episode
2013	Doctors	Russ Hemley	One episode
2013	The Girls' Guide to Depravity	Ben	Ten episodes
2015	Arthur and Merlin	Arthur/Arthfael	Film
2015	A Prince for Christmas	Prince Duncan	Television film
2016	Holby City	James Fielding	One episode
2017	Altitude	Terry	Film
2017	Henry IX	Quinton Baynes	One episode
2018	Squadron 303	Athol Forbes	Film
2018	The Hest	Dave	Serial
TBA	Seasons	Bugsy	Series in production Writer/Producer
