= Exile in Sarajevo =

- Directed by: Tahir Cambis; Alma Sahbaz
- Cinematography: Roman Baska
- Release date: 1998
- Country: Australia

Exile in Sarajevo is a 1998 Australian documentary film directed by Tahir Cambis and Alma Sahbaz, in which a Bosnian Australian returns to his homeland to record the impact the siege of Sarajevo on its inhabitants. It won the 1998 International Emmy for Documentaries.

== Awards ==
- 1997 Toronto International Film Festival : Real To Reel
- 1998 International Emmy: Documentary

Nominations:

- 1999 Logie Awards: Most Outstanding Documentary
