= The Cormorant Scarecrow =

- Directed by: Branko Ištvančić
- Written by: Davor Sismanovic
- Release date: 1998
- Running time: 30 minutes
- Country: Croatia
- Language: Croatian

The Cormorant Scarecrow (Plašitelj kormorana) is a Croatian documentary film directed by Branko Ištvančić. It was released in 1998.

The film has received a number of awards and is seen by many as the best Croatian documentary of the 1990s.

== Synopsis ==
The film depicts the daily lives of people whose job is to chase away cormorants that eat fish from a fish farm near Donji Miholjac, Croatia. Cormorants are protected by law and their nesting grounds are located across the border, in Hungary, which gives the protagonists' efforts a Sisyphean, absurdist feel.
