= Viva Bianca =

Australian actress (born 1983)

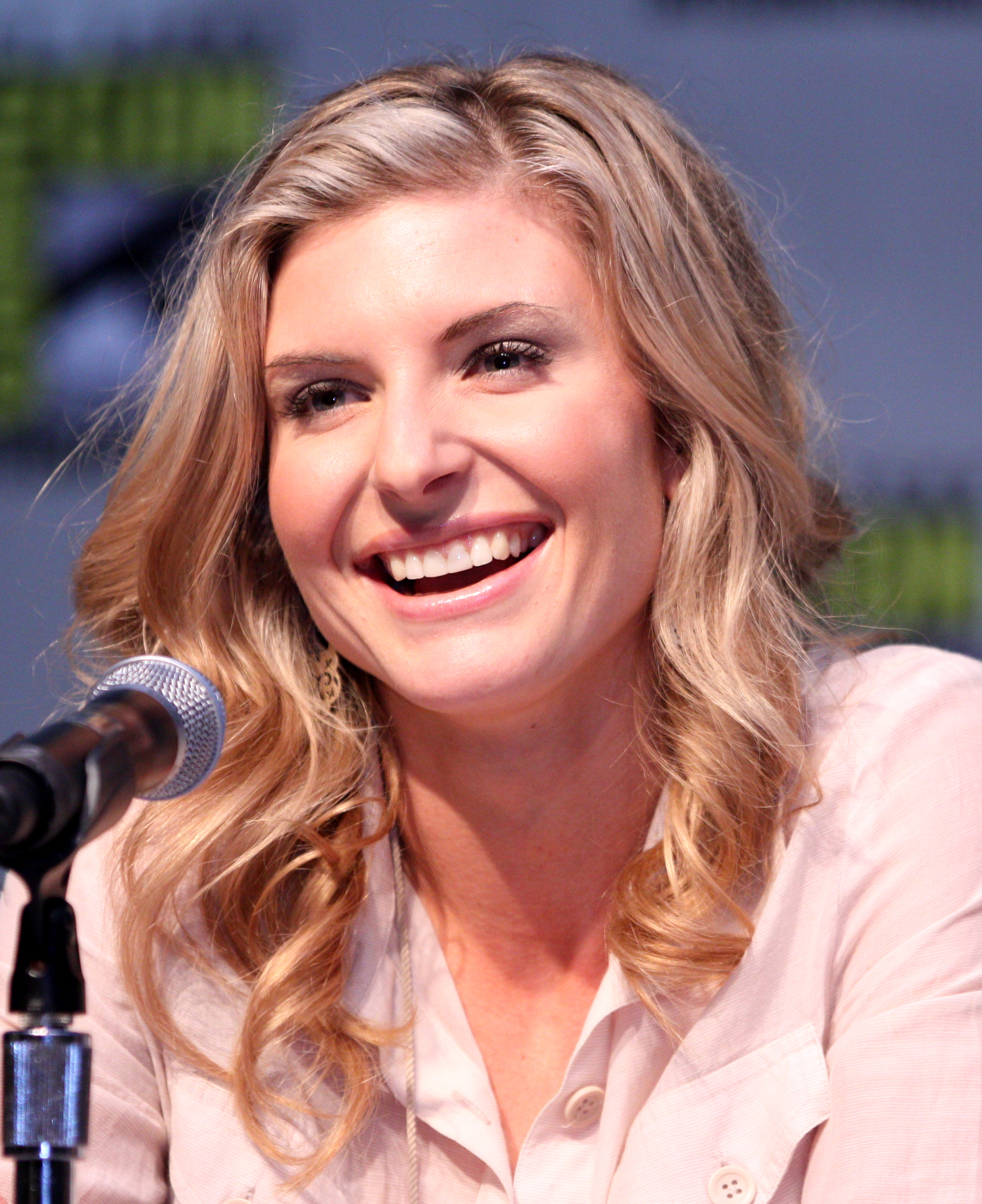
- Bianca at San Diego Comic-Con in July 2010
- Born: Viva Skubiszewski; 17 November 1983 (age 42); Melbourne, Victoria, Australia
- Occupation: Actress
- Years active: 2000–present
- Children: 2

Viva Bianca (born Viva Skubiszewski; 17 November 1983, /skuːbɪʃɛvski/; Polish: [skubiʂɛfski]) is an Australian actress best known for her role as Ilithyia on the Starz network series Spartacus: Blood and Sand and Spartacus: Vengeance.

Bianca graduated from the Western Australian Academy of Performing Arts where she received a best actress award. She is the daughter of Cezary Skubiszewski, a Polish Australian composer for film, television and orchestra. Bianca cites Cate Blanchett and Heath Ledger as Australian actors who have influenced her.

== Career ==
Bianca has appeared in many Australian TV Series such as Eugenie Sandler P.I., Marshall Law, All Saints and The Strip. She has also appeared in the Australian films Accidents Happen and Bad Bush.

Bianca starred as Ilithyia, the daughter of Roman senator Albinius and wife of legatus Gaius Claudius Glaber, in the Starz originals series Spartacus: Blood and Sand and Spartacus: Vengeance. She starred opposite Kirk Barker in A Prince for Christmas (2015).

In 2023, she joined the cast of Neighbours in the role of Chelsea Murphy. She made her first appearance on 16 January 2024.

== Filmography ==
| Year | Title | Role | Notes |
|---|---|---|---|
| 2000 | Eugénie Sandler P.I. | Adriana | Episode: "1.11"; Episode: "1.12" |
| 2002 | Marshall Law | Tiffany | Episode: "The Perfect Sister" |
| 2003 | Blue Heelers | Tammy King | Episode: "Too Hard Basket" |
| 2006 | All Saints | Michaeley Kratt | Episode: "Breaking Point" |
| 2008 | The Strip | Serena | Episode: "1.12" |
| 2009 | Accidents Happen | Becky | |
| 2009 | Bad Bush | Ophelia | |
| 2010 | Spartacus: Blood and Sand | Ilithyia | 13 episodes |
| 2011 | X: Night of Vengeance | Holly Rowe | |
| 2011 | Panic at Rock Island | Paige | TV movie |
| 2012 | Spartacus: Vengeance | Ilithyia | 10 episodes |
| 2014 | Scorned | Jennifer | |
| 2014 | The Reckoning | Detective Jane Lambert | |
| 2014 | Turkey Shoot | Cmdr Jill Wilson | |
| 2015 | A Prince for Christmas | Emma | TV movie |
| 2016 | Just Add Magic | Trudith Winters | Episode: "1.8" |
| 2016 | Showing Roots | Dee | TV movie |
| 2017 | Blind | Deanna | |
| 2018 | Wedding Swingers aka Porthole | Laura | Can't Have You (original title) |
| 2018 | Minutes to Midnight | Emily | Completed |
| 2018 | Deadman Standing | Rosie | |
| 2024 | Neighbours | Chelsea Murphy | 40 episodes |
