= Wellman (film) =

- Directed by: Branko Ištvančić
- Written by: Davor Šišmanović
- Release date: 2003
- Running time: 30 minutes
- Country: Croatia

Wellman (Croatian: Bunarman) is a 2003 Croatian documentary film directed by Branko Ištvančić. The title is a play on superhero names like Superman and Batman. The film was screened on over 30 festivals worldwide and received several awards.

== Synopsis ==
The film's protagonist, Antun "Nuno" Gabajček is a master of a dying trade: he excavates wells without using machines, relying only on hand tools. This approach is not just highly demanding physically, but also requires well-thought-out methods and resourcefulness.
