= Australian Choreographic Ensemble =

The Australian Choreographic Ensemble (ACE) (1992–1998) was an Australian contemporary dance company based in Sydney formed by Paul Mercurio in 1992. The company's founding dancers were Mercurio, Jan Pinkerton, David Prudham, Benedict Leslie, Brett Daffy, Katherine Arnold-Lindley and Paulina Quinteros. Other dancers included Sean Dwyer and Sharon Dalla-Costa

The company toured to large cities and small regional centres in Australia (excluding Western Australia), performing in a range of indoor and outdoor venues.

== Dance works ==
Dance works performed include:

- Contact (1992) choreographed by Mercurio
- Waiting (1993) choreographed by Mercurio
- Dancing with I (1993) choreographed by Mercurio
- Imprint a work for 10 dancers (1993) a collaboration between Mercurio, Jan Pinkerton, Carolyn Hammer and Stephen Page
- In-side-out (1994) comprising two works, Norman's Siren choreographed by Jan Pinkerton and A Place to Rest Your Head choreographed by Carolyn Hammer.

== Films ==
The company was associated with two films:

- Life's Burning Desire (1992) documented the establishment of ACE and the creation of Contact as well as Mercurio's diverse theatrical career, including his work with Sydney Dance Company, was documented.
- Envy (1992) a short film, choreographed by Mercurio and one of the ABC-TV project, Seven Deadly Sins.

While one dancer, Benedict Leslie featured in the Australian Movie, Billy's Holiday
