= HellKat =

- Directed by: Scott Jeffrey; Rebecca Matthew
- Written by: Michele Pacitto; Jordan Rockwell
- Produced by: Scott Jeffrey; Rebecca Matthew
- Starring: Sarah T. Cohen; Ryan Davies; Abi Casson Thompson; Frances Katz; Ricardo Freitas
- Cinematography: Ben Collin
- Edited by: Michael Hoad; Rebecca Matthew
- Music by: 20Six Hundred
- Production company: Proportion Productions
- Distributed by: Wild Eye Releasing
- Release date: 1 February 2021
- Running time: 78 minutes
- Country: United States
- Language: English

HellKat is a 2021 American horror film directed by Scott Jeffrey and Rebecca Matthew, starring Sarah T. Cohen, Ryan Davies, Abi Casson Thompson, Frances Katz and Ricardo Freitas.

== Cast ==
- Sarah T. Cohen as Katrina 'HellKat' Bash
- Ryan Davies as Jimmy Scott
- Abi Casson Thompson as Salt
- Frances Katz as Zombee
- Ricardo Freitas as Freddy ‘Fish’ Bones
- Adrian Bouchet as The Barkeep
- Vaani K Sharma as Mrs. Grizz
- Michael Hoad as Furbluh
- Serhat Metin as Grizz
- Harvey McDonald as Jan Divine

== Release ==
The film was released on digital platforms and to DVD on 2 February 2021.

== Reception ==
Jacob Walker of Starburst rated the film 1 star out of 5 and wrote, "What could have been a low budget Mortal Kombat is a waste of concept and time." Dakota Dahl of Rue Morgue wrote that "The bar is low for good horror and martial arts crossovers, and HELLKAT, in its single impressive feat, manages to limbo right under it." Paul Grammatico of MovieWeb wrote that "While the story has some intrigue, it may have been too bold for the budget."

Phil Wheat of Nerdly wrote a positive review of the film.
