= Jeremy Lindsay Taylor =

Australian actor (born 1973)

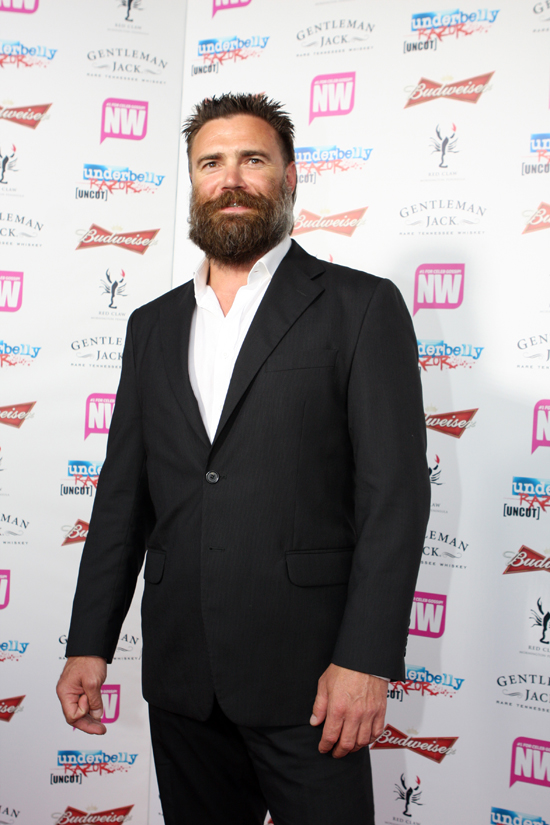
- Born: 19 September 1973 (age 53); Sydney, Australia
- Education: Newington College; University of Newcastle
- Occupation: Actor
- Years active: 1995–present

Jeremy Lindsay Taylor (born 19 September 1973) is an Australian actor.

== Education ==
He finished his education at Newington College in 1991 and graduated with a Bachelor of Arts degree, with a major in drama and sociology, from the University of Newcastle. He was a first grade cricketer and Rugby player at school. He was considered to be one of Newington College's finest medium pace seamers of all time.

== Acting career ==
He is known for his long-running role as Kurt Peterson in Heartbreak High. Since then he has appeared in Something in the Air, McLeod's Daughters, Stingers and Blue Heelers. In 2006, he guest-starred in the Doctor Who audio adventure The Reaping. Taylor appeared in the feature films Tom White, Em 4 Jay and Bad Bush.

His theatre credits include the Melbourne Theatre Company's Take Me Out. In 2007, Taylor co-starred with Lisa McCune, Ian Stenlake, Saskia Burmeister, John Batchelor, Matt Holmes, Jay Ryan, Kristian Schmid, Kirsty Lee Allan, and David Lyons in the hit Australian drama Sea Patrol. He portrayed Petty Officer Pete Tomaszewski ("Buffer") in 39 episodes from 2007–2009.

Taylor joined the cast of Canal Road in series 1, episode 9 as Cain Harvey in 2008. In 2009, he appeared in the UK.TV mini-series False Witness. He starred in Underbelly: Razor on the Nine Network and in Network Ten's Bikie Wars: Brothers in Arms. In 2012, Taylor starred in Network Ten's Australian coming of age series Puberty Blues as Martin Vickers and he returned to the show for a second series in 2014.

In 2013, he appeared in HBO Asia's Serangoon Road. He played Detective Dylan Carter in a recurring role on the Seven Network soap opera Home and Away in 2016. He reprised his role as Kurt Peterson in the 2022 Netflix reboot of Heartbreak High.

Taylor appears in the 2025 series The Last Anniversary as Ron, which was filmed in 2023. In late 2024, Taylor joined the main cast of Home and Away as Sergeant David Langham. His casting was initially kept secret and Taylor spent six months filming, before he made his debut on 28 May 2025.

== Filmography ==
=== Film ===
Year	Title	Role	Notes
2004	Tom White	Young Constable	
2006	Em 4 Jay	Dealer	
2009	Bad Bush	Turps	
2017	Rip Tide	Caleb	
2019	Sequin in a Blue Room	Dad	
2020	The Dry	Erik Falk	
2023	Kane	Abe	
2023	Transfusion	Jim Woods	
2024	Force of Nature: The Dry 2	Erik Falk	
2024	Audrey	Cormack Lipsick	
2025	Primitive War	General Grigory Borodin	
TBA	Homeward	TBA	Post-production

=== Television ===
Year	Title	Role	Notes	Ref
1995	Echo Point	Garden Centre Worker	Episode: #1.6	
1997–1999	Heartbreak High	Kurt Peterson	Regular role	
1999	Stingers	Rory Baines	Episode: "Unnatural Justice"	
2000–2002	Something in the Air	Ryan Cassidy	Main role	
2002	The Secret Life of Us	Hooper	Episode: "Walpurgisnacht"	
2002	Marshall Law	Grant	Episode: "Pleasure and Pain"	
2002–2003	Blue Heelers	Ian Bolger / Damian Nesbitt	Episodes: "Buddies", "Love In"	
2003	Stingers	Gus Abernathy	Episode: "Your Cheating Heart"	
2003	CrashBurn	Karl	Episode: "The Domino Theory of Rubbish"	
2004	McLeod's Daughters	Jack	Episode: "Jack of All Shades"	
2004–2005	Blue Heelers	Ryan Dekker	Episodes: "Tit for Tat", "Crash Site", "Vengeance"	
2007–2009	Sea Patrol	Petty Officer Pete Tomaszewski	Main role	
2008	Canal Road	Cain Harvey	Episode #1.9	
2009	False Witness	Mark Wilson	TV film	
2009	The Cut	Ritchie Bower	Episode: "A Falcon's Tail"	
2009	Rescue: Special Ops	Flynn	Episode #1.10	
2010	Cops L.A.C.	Daker Simms	Episode: "Old Love"	
2011	City Homicide	Dane Majors	Recurring role	
2011	Underbelly: Razor	Norman Bruhn	Recurring role	
2011	Wild Boys	Allan Brady	Episode #1.6	
2012	Dance Academy	Joe	Episode: "The Break"	
2012	Bikie Wars: Brothers in Arms	Leroy	5 episodes	
2012–2014	Puberty Blues	Martin Vickers	Main role	
2013	Serangoon Road	Frank Simpson	Main role	
2015	House of Hancock	Kevin Dalby	Episode #1.1	
2015	Gallipoli	Capt. Taylor	Episode: "The First Day"	
2015	Miss Fisher's Murder Mysteries	Stanley Burrows	Episode: "Game, Set & Murder"	
2016	Barracuda	Neal	TV miniseries	
2016	Love Child	Leon	Recurring role	
2016	Deep Water	Oscar Taylor	TV miniseries	
2016	Hyde & Seek	Andrew Mills	Main role	
2016–2017, 2019	Home and Away	Dylan Carter	Recurring role	
2017	Newton's Law	Andrew Devries	Episode: "Control Theory"	
2017	Offspring	Dan	Recurring role	
2018	Romper Stomper	Marco De Luca	Recurring role	
2018–2020	Playing for Keeps	Brian Rickards	Main role	
2019	The Family Law	Pete	5 episodes	
2019	Reef Break	Dylan Sawyer	2 episodes	
2019	Blue Water Empire	Captain Lewis	TV docu-drama miniseries	
2022	Heartbreak High	Kurt Peterson	Episode: "Rack Off"	
2022	Bump	Chris	Episode: "Parents of the Year"	
2023	The Claremont Murders	Steve Kirby	Episode #1.1	
2023	The Lost Flowers of Alice Hart	Paddy	Episode: "Part 2: Wattle"	
2023	Caught	John Utah	Episode: "Everyone Loves Australians"	
2024	Return To Paradise	Stuart Granger	Episode: "R.I.P. Tide"	
2025	The Last Anniversary	Ron	TV series	
2025–	Home and Away	David Langham	Series regular	

== See also ==
- Wild Boys
