= 260 Days =

Croatian war drama film

- Theatrical release poster
- Croatian: 260 dana
- Directed by: Jakov Sedlar
- Screenplay by: Dominik Sedlar
- Based on: 260 dana by Marijan Gubina
- Produced by: Marijan Gubina; Alexander Hrkac; Ilenka Jelowicki; Drazen Majstrovic; Jakov Sedlar
- Starring: Tim Roth; Will Godber; Sam Hazeldine; Camilla Rutherford; Isabella Dempster; Armand Assante; Ángela Molina; Alec Newman
- Cinematography: Davor Bjelanovic
- Edited by: Yvan Gauthier
- Music by: Anne Dudley (theme by); Dalibor Grubačević (score by)
- Production companies: 260 days Ltd. Croatia Film; Aramis
- Release date: November 2, 2025 (Gradski vrt Hall)
- Running time: 138 minutes
- Countries: Croatia; United States
- Language: English
- Budget: €5.9 (est.)

260 Days (Croatian: 260 dana) is a 2025 Croatian-American English language war drama film based on 2011 autobiographical historical novel of the same name by Marijan Gubina, directed by Jakov Sedlar and script supervised by Barry Morrow.

Novel and the movie are based on Gubina's (born 1981) experience of captivity in Serbian concentration camp for 260 days during Croatian War of Independence, from August 1, 1991, to April 16, 1992. During his imprisonment in the camp as a 10-year-old boy, Gubina was abused, forced to collect dead bodies and witnessed his sister's, Nena, rape several times. The Croatian National Theatre in Osijek staged an award-winning play of his experience in 2014.

== Cast ==
(incomplete)

- Will Godber as Marijan Gubina (child)
- Tim Roth as Marijan Gubina (adult)
- Sam Hazeldine as Hinko Gubina (Marijan's father)
- Camilla Rutherford as Marija Gubina (Marijan's mother)
- Isabella Dempster as Nena Gubina (Marijan's older sister)
- Florence Bensberg as Gabrijela Gubina (Marijan's sister)
- Antea Huljev Žuvan as Helena Gubina (Marijan's youngest sister)
- Armand Assante as Yugoslav People's Army officer
- Ángela Molina as Dragana
- Alec Newman as Miloš
- Naomi Frederick as Vukica
- Joseph Millson as Sergeant Divac
- Adrian Bouchet as Uroš
- Tom Forbes as Milivoje
- Jacopo Olmo Antinori as Dragan Borojevic
- Kiefer Moriarty as Michael
- Konstantin Haag as Marijan's Assistant
- Craig Russell as Commander Stojakovic
- Ivana Skelin as Dr Jovana Pusic
- Nikolas Salmon as Aleks
- Mars Sams as Boro
- Pere Eranovic as Man on the Bike

== Production ==
=== Development and casting ===
The official website (260days.net) was launched by the end of December 2023. First press conference on the filming of the movie was held soon after, on January 28, 2024, in Osijek, Croatia. Among others, Hanna Schygulla, Armand Assante, Lujo Kunčević, Pero Eranović, and Konstantin Haag were announced as the cast members at the conference. Tim Roth, Angela Molina, Sam Hazeldine, Camilla Rutherford, Isabella Dempster and Will Godber were also announced as cast members.

Crowdfunding campaign for the movie was opened on December 1, 2023. So far (July 2025), campaign raised €3.94 million. Movie ambassadors include singer Dino Jelusić, soccer coach Zlatko Dalić, waterpolo coach Ivica Tucak, Croatian minister Tomo Medved, writer Hrvoje Hitrec, waterpolo player Dubravko Šimenc, gymnast Robert Seligman, boxer Luka Pratljačić, Fr. Nikola Pašalić, rabbi Jack Bemporad, among others. Film was also supported by several Croatian writers of historical novels regarding Croatian War of Independence (Goran Hiller, Vilim Karlović, Damir Plavšić, Zdravko Carević, Antun Fuglinski and Zoran Filipović). Croatian Ministry of Defence and the Ministry of Croatian Veterans also supported the movie.

=== Filming ===
Casting was held in London during March and April 2024. 36 candidates auditioned for the role of the young Marijan Gubina, for which Will Godber was selected. Filming started on May 15 and ended by June 2024 in Osijek. Filming started in Đakovo and Gorjani, where family and childhood scenes were filmed. Film was shot mostly in Gorjani, Đakovo, Osijek's historic Tvrđa, Vukovar and at the several locations in Osijek-Baranja County. Gorjani were selected to represent Dalj, Gubina's birthplace, with traditional Slavonic wooden houses and agricultural landscape. In total, 41 actor appears in the movie. Castings for extras were held during May 2024 in Đakovo and Požega. Around 60 of them appears in the film, some of which are Croatian survivors of the Serbian concentration camps and war veterans.

== Release ==
260 Days premiered on November 2, 2025 at the Gradski vrt Hall in Osijek. It is being aired in Croatian movie theaters in Slavonski Brod, Đakovo, Dubrovnik, Našice, Zagreb and other places. More than 5,000 spectators visited Krešimir Ćosić Hall in Zadar for the local premiere on December 17, 2025.

== Awards ==
In November 2025, the film won Best Feature Film at the East Village New York Film Festival. In February 2026, 260 Days won Best War and Peace Film at the New Delhi Film Festival. The film was also awarded Outstanding Achievement at the Swedish International Film Festival.
