= David Sterne =

British actor (born 1946)

- Born: 1946 (age 79–80)
- Occupation: Actor
- Years active: 1969–present

David Sterne (born 1946) is an English actor. He has appeared in more than 90 films since 1973.

== Career ==
After leaving the British Army, Sterne trained at the Webber Douglas Academy of Dramatic Art. A former member of the Royal Shakespeare Company he has worked in television, film and radio for over 40 years.

== Filmography ==
=== Film ===
Year	Title	Role	Notes
1977	Sinbad and the Eye of the Tiger	Aboo-Seer	
1978	Let's Get Laid	Sgt. Millicent	
1981	Venom	Driver	
1997	Photographing Fairies	Prison Warder	
1998	Jinnah	Birtwhistle	
1999	Tale of the Mummy	Morris	
2001	Mr In-Between	Detective Inspector Marlowe	
2001	A Knight's Tale	Retired Knight	
2005	Harry Potter and the Goblet of Fire	Ministry Wizard #1	
2006	Pirates of the Caribbean: Dead Man's Chest	Edinburgh Cook	
2008	Hussein Who Said No		
2009	Slaughter	Jorgen	
2009	Dorian Gray	Theatre Manager	
2010	The Wolfman	Mr Kirk	
2012	Truth or Dare	Woodbridge	
2014	300: Rise of an Empire	Old Statesman	
2014	Blood Moon	Charlie Packham	
2015	Arthur and Merlin	King Vortigern	
2026	28 Years Later: The Bone Temple	George	

=== Television ===
Year	Title	Role	Notes
1996	Thief Takers	DCI Frank Uttley	
2003	The Queen's Nose	Chief	
2004–2005	The Mysti Show	Professor Dust	
2007	HolbyBlue	Sgt. Edward Macfadden	
2009	Robin Hood	Old Man	Series 3 Episode 11 "The Enemy of My Enemy"
2010	Hustle	Bob	Series 6 Episode 66 The Hush Heist"
2011	Death in Paradise	Neville	Series 1 Episode 7 "Music of Murder"
2012	Hunted	Dave Ryder	
2014	Detectorists	Larry Bishop	Series 1
2016	Red Dwarf XI	Einstein Bob	
2016	The Coroner	John 'Blackbeard' Fraser	Episode 2.9 "Pieces of Eight"
2017	1066: A Year to Conquer England	English Noble	Docudrama
2017, 2019	Casualty	Bill Danes	2 episodes
2019	Vikings	Gudmund	
2020	Doctors	Arnold Mayes	Episode: "No More Heroes"
2021	The Wheel of Time	Cenn Buie	Episode: "Leavetaking"
2022–present	Sister Boniface Mysteries	Tom Thomas	Recurring role
2022	Doctors	Frank Brownhill	Episode: "Brownhill and Son"
2024	EastEnders	Harold Martin	Guest role
2026	Love Through a Prism	Charles Brant	Voice; 20 episodes

=== Video games ===
Year	Title	Role	Notes
1994	Burn Cycle	Dealey	
2011	Dragon Age II	Corypheus	
2014	Dragon Age: Inquisition	Corypheus	
2015	Everybody's Gone to the Rapture	Frank Appleton	
2016	Dark Souls III	Yoel of Londor	
