= A Prince for Christmas =

- Promotional poster
- Written by: Fred Olen Ray; Peter Sullivan
- Directed by: Fred Olen Ray
- Starring: Viva Bianca; Kirk Barker; Aaron O'Connell; Kelly LeBrock; Maxwell Caulfield
- Music by: Matthew Janszen
- Country of origin: United States
- Original language: English

Production
- Producer: Fred Olen Ray
- Cinematography: Theo Angell
- Editor: Randy Carter
- Running time: 87 minutes
- Production company: Hybrid/Mascot Pictures

Original release
- Network: Starz
- Release: November 29, 2015

A Prince for Christmas is a 2015 American made-for-television Christmas romantic drama film produced and directed by Fred Olen Ray and starring Viva Bianca, Kirk Barker and Aaron O'Connell. The film was originally called Small Town Prince and premiered on Starz network on November 29, 2015.

== Storyline ==
The king and queen of the European kingdom of Balemont arrange a marriage for their son and heir, Prince Duncan fixing the wedding for Christmas Day, however, Duncan is dismayed and a week before the unhappy day he runs away incognito to the small town of East Aurora in the United States, changing his name to David. Arriving there in the snow, he goes for a meal in a diner and literally bumps into Emma a single woman who owns and operates the business, who has just broken up with her intended, Todd, Emma is also responsible for looking after her teenage sister, Alice, as their parents have both died.

David dates Emma and falls in love, however, after a whirlwind romance, Emma finds out who David really is from a newspaper article about the imminent wedding of Prince Duncan to Isabelle de Montavia and she angrily sends him away. He returns home to Balemont, but persuades his parents to cancel the planned wedding, and on Christmas Eve he returns for Emma.

Todd, a car salesman, remains interested in Emma. On discovering that Duncan has wooed her while about to marry Isabelle, Emma has the notable line "Two men in my life, and the honest one turns out to be the used car salesman!"

== Cast ==
- Viva Bianca as Emma
- Kirk Barker as Prince Duncan
- Aaron O'Connell as Todd
- Maxwell Caulfield as King of Balemont
- Kelly LeBrock as Queen Ariana
- Mark Lindsay Chapman as Geoffrey
- Brittany Beery as Alice
- Wendy Egloff as Wendy
- Gregory Nyburg as Skate Attendant
- Richard Lounello as Kenny
- Christine Hulton as Holiday Shopper

== Production ==
The film is the sixth of Ray's holiday films shot in the Buffalo area.

== Reception ==
The Movie Scene calls the film "another movie which reworks the Prince from Europe masquerading as a normal guy in America and meeting a young woman who inevitably works in the small town diner." However, its review goes on to welcome embellishments to the storyline, with Emma looking after her sister and not celebrating Christmas, which was when their parents had both died. It also calls the film "visually beautiful", with snow covered streets and wood-panelled interiors, describes Barker and Bianca as having a lot of eye appeal, and applauds Barker's well-spoken but unpompous prince, so that the film "does deliver a picture perfect look of a small town at Christmas with plenty of snow and Christmas decorations."

== Allusions ==
A line in the film spoken by Emma, "Snow melts, lights go down, it's all just an illusion", is used as a chapter heading in Lauren Rosewarne's study Analyzing Christmas in Film: Santa to the Supernatural (2017).

== See also ==
- List of Christmas films
