= The Ghost in the Swamp =

- Movie poster
- Croatian: Duh u močvari
- Directed by: Branko Ištvančić
- Written by: Edi Mužina; Silvio Mirošničenko
- Based on: Duh u močvari by Anto Gardaš
- Starring: Ivo Gregurević; Dejan Aćimović; Marko Pavlov
- Music by: Dalibor Grubačević
- Distributed by: Croatian Radiotelevision
- Release date: 25 June 2006 (Međunarodni Dječji Festival)
- Running time: 90 minutes
- Country: Croatia
- Language: Croatian

The Ghost in the Swamp (Croatian: Duh u močvari) is a 2006 film directed by Branko Ištvančić, based on the book Duh u močvari by Anto Gardaš. The film premiered at the 2006 Međunarodni Dječji Festival in Šibenik.

== Plot ==
After Liptus arrives in a small village from the city, he calls his best friends, Miron and Melita, on winter holidays in Kopačevo. That same night, while they are all sleeping cozily, from their deep sleep Miron and Melita are woken by the disturbing sounds of villagers, carrying flares and disappearing into the darkness at the end of the street. At the docks, they find Halasz, a boy known for his bravery. He is cold, pale from shock, and babbling a white ghost. While most of the villagers don't believe Halasz's story, older citizens recall a long time ago when a forgotten spirit would scare people at night in dark and foggy swamps. Everyone locks themselves in their houses and Halasz ends up in a hospital where the doctors can't help him. Miron, Liptus, and Melita, now alone, take matters into their own hands, revealing the secret of the ghost and saving their friend.

== Cast ==
- Ivo Gregurević as Vučević
- Dejan Aćimović as Levay
- Marko Pavlov as Miron
- Ena Ikica as Melita
- Robert Váss as Liptus
- Vlatko Dulić as Farkaš
- Mladen Vulić as Kovačević

== Music ==
The film's soundtrack was composed by Dalibor Grubačević. It was distributed under Croatia Records 10 October 2006.
