= The Match (2021 film) =

- Film poster
- Directed by: Dominik Sedar; Jakov Sedlar
- Written by: Gary Hertz; Stephen Ollendorff; Dominik Sedlar
- Produced by: Johnny Arreola; Cassandra Gava; Stephen Ollendorff; Jakov Sedlar; Lana Strmečki; Orsat Zovko
- Starring: Franco Nero; Armand Assante; Caspar Phillipson
- Cinematography: Davor Bjelanović
- Edited by: Denis Golenja
- Music by: Dalibor Grubačević
- Distributed by: Mutiny Pictures (USA); Vendetta Film (Australia, New Zealand); A2 Filmes (Latin America); Altitude Film Distribution (United Kingdom); Eagle Pictures (Italy); Exponenta Film (Russia); Black Hill Pictures (Germany); Bulow Media (Spain); Star Entertainment (India); Movement Pictures (Korea); Best Digital (Taiwan); Jabadoo (Benelux); Italia Film (Middle East); Royal Holding (Scandinavia); Encore Inflight (Airlines)
- Release dates: July 2021 (Jewish film festival); July 25, 2021
- Running time: 119 minutes
- Countries: United States; Croatia
- Language: English

The Match is a 2021 Croatian-American sports historical drama directed by Dominik and Jakov Sedlar and starring Franco Nero, Armand Assante, and Caspar Phillipson. The film was inspired by true events which transpired in the spring of 1944.

== Plot ==
To commemorate Adolf Hitler’s birthday, the Nazis organized a football match between an elite Nazi team and a squad of inmates from the camps made up of ex-footballers and political prisoners. Led by the former Hungarian football captain the team of prisoners are winning by virtue of their skills. During the half time they are given an assurance that they win freedom if they lose deliberately. However, despite all the obstacles confronting them, they are determined to win no matter what happens. The story is told in flashback by the last member of the team, then a boy, who manages to survive.

== Cast ==
- Franco Nero as Branko
- Caspar Phillipson as Colonel Franz
- Armand Assante as Commander
- Markus Gertken as General
- Viktor Kulhanek as Young Branko
- Andrej Dojkić as Laszlo Horvath
- Filip Tallhamn as Karolyi Faraco
- Philippe Reinhardt as Henckel
- Milton Welsh as Peter
- Paško Vukasović as Tibor
- Inva Mula as Magda Stekely
- Andrea Zirio as Sandor Stekely
- Robert Maaser as Hans Gruber
- Lujo Kunčević as Tomasz
- Mateo Kovačić as Footballer #1
- Dejan Lovren as Footballer #2
- Ivan Colarić as Janko

== Release ==
The film premiered at The Jewish International Film Festival in New Zealand on July 25, 2021, and it was released theatrically in the United States, on October 29, 2021, by Mutiny Pictures. On December 2, 2021, the film had its television premiere on Showtime Networks.

== Music ==
The film's soundtrack was composed by Croatian composer Dalibor Grubačević. It was distributed under Plaza Mayor Company on August 20, 2021.

== See also ==
- The Death Match
- Escape to Victory
