= Caspar Phillipson =

Danish actor (born 1971)

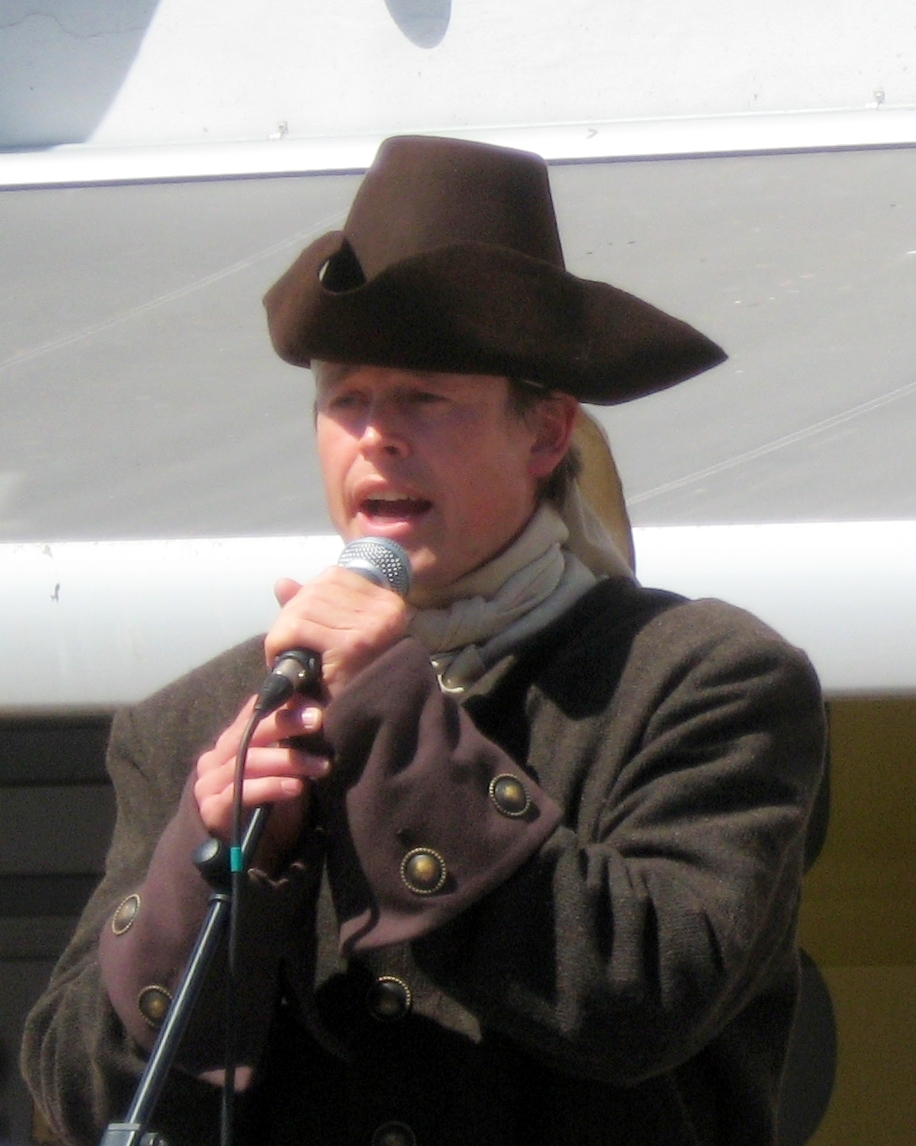
- Caspar Phillipson performs in Frederikshavn in 2009
- Born: 13 January 1971 (age 55); Copenhagen, Denmark
- Occupation: Actor
- Years active: 1995–present
- Spouse: Marianne Phillipson
- Children: 3
- Website: www.casparphillipson.com

Caspar Phillipson (born 13 January 1971) is a Danish actor and singer who performs on screen, stage, and as a voice actor, predominantly in Scandinavian productions. Phillipson is best known in the English-speaking world for his portrayal of John F. Kennedy in the 2016 film Jackie. Although Phillipson appears in Jackie for only ten minutes, his resemblance to Kennedy has been considered unusually striking. Phillipson has subsequently portrayed Kennedy in other projects, including the TV series Project Blue Book and the films Blonde (2022), Hammarskjöld (2023), and Maria (2024).

== Biography ==
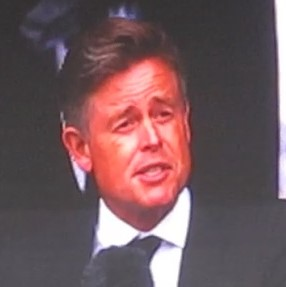
Phillipson as John F. Kennedy at the Rebild Festival 2022 delivering the 1962 "We choose to go to the Moon" Rice University speech

His father, Robert Phillipson, was an associate professor of English at Roskilde University and his stepmother, Finnish Tove Skutnabb-Kangas, was a linguist. Because of Caspar's Scottish father, he grew up bilingual. His biological mother is Danish Helle-Vibeke Brinch.

Phillipson work as a stage actor, screen actor, and voice actor. As a voice actor, Phillipson has dubbed roles from English-language films into Danish, including revoicing Johnny Depp as Willy Wonka in Charlie and the Chocolate Factory (2005). Phillipson has appeared in Scandinavian productions for the screen, including the television series The Bridge and Borgen.

Phillipson portrayed John F. Kennedy in Jackie (2016), his first role in an English-language film. He first auditioned for the part by video from Istanbul while appearing in a stage production of Hamlet. To audition in person for Jackie in Paris, Phillipson claimed sick leave from a Danish stage production called Don't Touch Nefertiti, missing five sold-out performances in a role that had been specially written for him. The Danish theater company took Phillipson to court and, in January 2017, the company was awarded kr. 116,000 for the inconvenience he had caused the theater.

Although Phillipson appeared for less than ten minutes in Jackie, the press noted his close resemblance to Kennedy. The Washington Post commented on the resemblance after photos from the film's set were released: "That thatch of hair, those white teeth, the smile lines around the eyes — all very Kennedyesque. He might not be familiar to U.S. audiences, but he's far more visually similar to the former prez than other actors who’ve played JFK in recent memory, including James Marsden in The Butler (2013), Greg Kinnear in the 2011 TV miniseries The Kennedys and Rob Lowe in 2013's Killing Kennedy." Prior to auditioning for the part, Phillipson said his resemblance to Kennedy had only been noticed when he spent time in the United States: "I did a workshop years ago with Frank Corsaro, this iconic American teacher — he was the leader of Actors Studio — and suddenly, in the middle of a different scene, he said in this gruff voice, 'You have to do Kennedy one day. You just have to.'" Following Corsaro's advice, Phillipson practiced speeches by Kennedy and his brother Robert F. Kennedy, who he believed he more closely resembled.

Jackie casting director Mathilde Snodgrass said, "There had been an actor in Los Angeles who had done JFK for 10 or 15 years. He was in everything. But he was getting too old now. I thought, if Caspar could come with us, then he could be the next one. He could be the guy". After the film's release, Phillipson appeared in live performances as Kennedy alongside Anders Agner Pedersen, a Danish biographer of Kennedy; Pedersen provided historical context for a Kennedy speech before Phillipson delivered it. The actor delivered notable speeches by Kennedy such as his inaugural address, his 1963 American University speech, and his 1963 West Berlin speech. Phillipson reprised the role of Kennedy again in a short film, performing a "lost" speech written for the president to deliver on 22 November 1963, the date of his assassination. Phillipson's delivery of the speech was filmed at the 2017 COLCOA Film Festival and released as The Speech JFK Never Gave. He also played Kennedy in films Blonde (2022), Hammarskjöld (2023), and Maria (2024).

== Filmography ==
=== Film ===
Year	Title	Role	Notes
2008	Alliancen	—	Short film
2008	Flame & Citron	Schalburg Soldat with glasses	
2008	Elsker ikke	Mand	Short film
2008	En sikker vinder	Træner	Short film
2009	The Escape	Policeman	
2010	Den milde smerte	Thorkild Hansen	
2011	Det sorte får	Magnus	Short film
2011	M for Markus	Janus	Short film
2012	Min søsters børn alene hjemme (My Sister's Kids Home Alone)	Janus	
2013	Antboy	Mr. Sommersted	
2014	Itsi Bitsi	Halfdan Rasmussen	
2015	Sommeren '92	Morten Stig Christensen	
2015	Emma & Julemanden: Jagten på elverdronningens hjerte (Emma and Santa Claus: The Quest for the Elf Queen's Heart)	Jesper	
2015	Villads fra Valby	Frida's father	
2016	Kærlighed og andre katastrofer (Love and Other Catastrophes)	Ejendomsmægler	
2016	Jackie	John F. Kennedy	
2016	Sporskifte	Ticket Collector	Short film
2017	The Speech JFK Never Gave	John F. Kennedy	Short film
2017	Så længe jeg lever	Jørn Hjorting	
2018	Mission: Impossible – Fallout	Plutonium Dealer	
2020	Odd Man Rush	Coach Tomas	
2021	Marco-effekten	Rene Eriksen	
2021	Skyggen i mit øje	Bateson	
2021	The Match	Colonel Franz	
2021	A Taste of Hunger	Head Waiter	
2022	Blonde	John F. Kennedy	
2022	The Conversation	Josep Tito	Nominated – Idyllwild International Festival of Cinema for Best Actor in 2025
2023	Hammarskjöld	John F. Kennedy	
2024	Maria	John F. Kennedy	

=== Television ===
Year	Title	Role	Notes	
1995	Hjem til fem	Søren	2 episodes	
2002	Arsenik og gamle kniplinger	Mortimer Brewster	Television film	
2006–2007	Barda – Et rollespil	—	3 episodes	
2009	2900 Happiness	Arthur	1 episode	
2010	The Protectors	Krasser	2 episodes	
2010	Borgen	Lars Bang	1 episode	
2011	Lapland	Teppo	Television film	
2013	The Bridge	Dansk läkare / Dansk læge / Danish doctor	1 episode	
2014	Dicte	Johan Poulsen	3 episodes	
2020	Project Blue Book	John F. Kennedy	3 episodes	
2022	Orkestret	Simon Elliott	20 episodes	Nominated – Robert Awards for Best Supporting Actor in 2023 and 2025
