= Kick (1999 film) =

Australian film

- Directed by: Lynda Heys
- Written by: Stuart Beattie
- Produced by: Mariel Beros; Lynda Heys; Sharon Kruger; Ross Matthews; Steve Turnbull
- Starring: Russell Page; Rebecca Yates; Martin Henderson; Radha Mitchell; Paul Mercurio; George Spartels; Jason Clarke
- Cinematography: Martin McGrath
- Edited by: John Scott
- Music by: Nerida Tyson-Chew
- Release date: 14 December 1999 (Australia)
- Running time: 92 minutes
- Country: Australia
- Language: English

Kick is an Australian film produced and directed by Lynda Heys. It stars Russell Page, Rebecca Yates, Martin Henderson, Radha Mitchell, Paul Mercurio and George Spartels. It was released on 14 December 1999 in Australia.

== Plot ==
Matt Grant (Russell Page) is a champion rugby player at a private Sydney boys school. However he secretly wants to be a ballet dancer. Seizing an opportunity to audition for a local company's presentation of Romeo and Juliet, he nonetheless fears what will happen to his reputation if the other kids in his school find out. Adding the rehearsals to his already burgeoning schedule quickly starts to create problems with his friends, his girlfriend Tamara (Radha Mitchell), his teachers, his coach, the play director (Paul Mercurio), and his ballet partner Claire (Rebecca Yates).

== Cast ==
- Russell Page as Matt Grant
- Rebecca Yates as Claire Andrews
- Martin Henderson as Tom Bradshaw
- Radha Mitchell as Tamara Spencer
- Paul Mercurio as David Knight
- George Spartels as Jack Grant
- Philip Holder as Mr Power
- Peter Gwynne as Dr Derrick
- Zoe Bertram as Sonia Quaid
- Laurence Breuls as Steve
- Jason Clarke as Nicholas Ratcliff
- Kip Gamblin as Roland
- Brendan Cowell as Macca
- Chris Sadrinna as Smithy
- Sebastian Goldspink as Gazza
- Cecily Polson as Mrs Derrick
- Kevin Taumata as Samoan Fullback
- Les Foxcroft as Old Groundsman

== Production ==
Producer Steve Turnbull later revealed the distributor took the director's original 115-minute cut and reduced it to 85 minutes.

The film was shot in Sydney, with filming locations including St Joseph's College (using extras from Knox Grammar School), Luna Park and the Sydney Opera House.

== Remake ==
In 2014 Turnbull and Heys announced plans to remake the film.
