= Hunting for Shadows =

- Directed by: Davo Hardy
- Written by: Davo Hardy
- Produced by: Davo Hardy
- Starring: Sage Amethyst Matchett; Sage Godrei; Paul Mercurio
- Cinematography: Charlotte Borriraji
- Edited by: Davo Hardy
- Music by: William Haškovec
- Production companies: Davo Hardy Productions; Frederick International
- Distributed by: www.davohardyfilms.com
- Release date: October 2016
- Running time: 75 minutes
- Country: Australia
- Language: English

Hunting for Shadows is a 2016 Australian horror film directed by Davo Hardy. It stars Sage Amethyst Matchett, Sage Godrei and Paul Mercurio. Loosely based on various Indigenous Australian mythologies, notably on a variation on the Bunyip and Kurdaitcha Man, the film opens with a disclaimer, reminding the audience to treat the overall film as a work of fiction.

Dealing with an unusual subject matter, utilizing the storytelling device of Indigenous Australians, this film balances realism and creative liberty in the same fashion as The Blair Witch Project, as the Dreamtime has no authoritative or recorded references to check data or accuracy.

Focusing on the perils of being a small child in an unforgiving landscape, whilst being pursued by a demonic force, the film taps into instinctual fears and plays off the suspense, rather than the horror and gore of most contemporary independent films of its type.

The film also pays homage to Dot and the Kangaroo as well as brings characterisation and reference to the Quinkin variation of the Bunyip. It was Davo Hardy's second feature film.

Principal production took place between 1 March – 17 May 2016, before premiering in Sydney, Australia on 3 October 2016.

On 24 September 2016, it was given a prestigious pre-release screening as part of the Blue Heeler Film Festival. Australian streaming platform OzFlix acquired the rights to distribution in January 2017.

== Plot ==
Nature and outdoor recreation enthusiasts Keith and Laura are on a week-long camping vacation with their 10-year-old daughter, Ellen. They spend their time sightseeing and touring nature reserves. Keith notices Ellen is bored, preferring to read illustrated books on mythological creatures. The tour guide explains a goanna species and how it can be blamed for damage to property around the campsites, before explaining that the Quinkins, a variation on the classic Bunyip creature, is a Dreamtime creature that plays pranks on humans but sometimes these tricks can be dangerous. Ellen follows her parents to a lookout, whining about when they'll be visiting an opal mine. Laura apologizes that they may not have time and Keith is quick to assure her that they have a whole week for such activity. Laura is looking forward to telling scary stories by the campfire, which Keith remarks to Ellen as being amusingly ghoulish. On the drive to the next site, Ellen sleepily asks if there are quinkins among the trees but Keith assures her that they are just trees. Dismissing her daughter's claims, Laura notices Ellen has fallen asleep. Driving over a pothole, Ellen is startled and disoriented. Her parents are still nonplused by her nervousness.

At the campground, they meet James Beasley, the owner of the campsite. There is clear animosity between James and Laura. Keith explains to Ellen that James was a Scout leader when he and Laura were teenagers, before recalling a story about he nearly drowned on one of the obstacle courses. Later, Ellen asks why Laura hates James. Laura explains her own near-death experience while abseiling under James' supervision. She holds James accountable and cynically remarks about why her complaints were swept under the rug by other Scout leaders. Keith says this was inappropriate and reminds Laura to not influence Ellen with opinions that have nothing to do with her. Above all, Laura enjoys scary stories, therefore it is important to understand fear.

Ellen visits James in his Winnebago and he encourages her to retain her curiosity and quest for knowledge, making her promise to stay a kid for as long as possible. He laments having made mistakes in the past and carries the burden of blame.

After crafting a boomerang, Ellen is disheartened when it does not fly and return like she expects. Laura and Keith try to comfort her as Tahlee, an Aboriginal girl, approaches and helps to soothe Ellen's concerns by telling the story of how the moon was created by a little girl's love for her tribe.

Later that night, Laura tells a scary story by the campfire. Ultimately building up to a punchline, it is discovered that Laura intentionally set out to scare Ellen and the rest of the adults are amused by this. Ellen is sent to bed as Laura comments that her tent is distant from the rest of the campers as she is a light sleeper.

During the night, Ellen is awoken by sounds of screaming and chaos as something unseen attacks the campground. In a series of quick cuts, we see Laura and Keith are brutally killed amid the hysteria. Overcome with fear, Ellen faints. When she wakes up, come morning, Ellen is quick to realize that she is the sole survivor of an apparent campsite massacre. Retreating to her tent, realizing she is without communications and aware that she is not in a dream, Ellen is forced to escape the campsite alone. She finds James slaughtered in his Winnebago and uncovers Laura by the cold campfire pit, before stealing her keys and fleeing the campsite.

Throughout Ellen's journey to escape, she stumbles upon the bodies of familiar characters as the Quinkins pursue her. Reuniting with Tahlee, who has also escaped the bloodshed, Ellen is forced to slaughter an emu and don its skin for a bone pointing ritual to banish the Quinkins before she is rescued by ranger.

Tahlee's fate is left open-ended and the ranger is skeptical that Ellen's story is even valid. Traumatised and an orphan, Ellen in resigned to the bleakness of her survival, but the ranger still struggles to draw conclusions without taking Ellen's story into account.

== Cast ==
- Sage Amethyst Matchett - Ellen
- Sage Godrei - Tahlee
- Paul Mercurio - James Beasley
- Tracey Batenburg - Laura
- Will Luckman - Keith
- Annick Rickenbach - Ranger Gwen
- Tim Mason Scott - Noah

== Reception ==
Hunting for Shadows was premiered in Sydney on 3 October 2016, to generally positive reviews. Shortly after, in December 2016, the film was released by OzFlix, in Australasia and Pacific regions.
