= Arthur and Merlin =

- Directed by: Marco van Belle
- Written by: Kat Wood; Marco van Belle
- Produced by: Paul Osborne; Marco van Belle; Rob Speranza; Joe Burrows
- Starring: Kirk Barker; Stefan Butler; Nigel Cooke; Charlotte Brimble; Adrian Bouchet; David Sterne; Nick Asbury
- Cinematography: Phil Wood
- Edited by: James Page
- Music by: Graham Plowman
- Production company: Movie Works
- Distributed by: Signature Entertainment
- Release date: 11 April 2015
- Running time: 104 minutes
- Country: United Kingdom
- Language: English
- Budget: £230,000

Arthur and Merlin is a 2015 independent British feature film directed by Marco van Belle and written by Kat Wood and Marco van Belle. The film, which stars Kirk Barker, Stefan Butler, Nigel Cooke and David Sterne, is based on the original Celtic tales of Arthur and Merlin.

== Plot ==
In ancient Britain, a time of magic and legend, a powerful druid named Aberthol(Nigel Cooke) is bent on destroying the Celtic people. Keeping the aging Celtic King under his control, Aberthol sends many warriors to their death under the guise of fighting the Saxons. However, Arthur (Kirk Barker) a young warrior, questions Aberthol's true motives. After saving a Christian Celt woman from Aberthol's men, Arthur is mysteriously given a powerful sword that grants him visions showing him not only Aberthol's true intent, but also the one man who can defeat him. When Arthur is banished after confronting Aberthol over the Celt's latest defeat, he sets out to find the man for he knows who he is. The man is Merlin (Stefan Butler) a hermit wizard, who Arthur had saved many years ago, when both were young boys, from Aberthol. While Merlin first refuses to help, he changes his mind once he sees the sword Arthur wields, realizing that the gods that created him, have also chosen Arthur. Now Arthur and Merlin must fight together and defeat Aberthol and save their people. However, they soon learn that Aberthol's plan is far more sinister and far bigger than they originally thought.

== Cast ==
- Kirk Barker as Arthur/Arthfael
- Stefan Butler as Merlin/Myrrdin
- Nigel Cooke as Aberthol
- Charlotte Brimble as Olwen
- Adrian Bouchet as Lucan
- David Sterne as King Vortigern
- Nick Asbury as Orin
- Andrew Grose as Brian
- Garth Maunders as Faelan
- Joseph Attenborough as Eogan
- Jack Rigby as Anyon
- Alison Harris as Branwen
- Jack Maw as young Myrrdin
- Hattie Pardy-McLaughlin as young Nia
- Harvey Walsh as young Arthfael

== Release ==
The film premiered at the BFI Southbank cinema on 11 April 2015. Later in 2015, the film was released digitally on 14 September via iTunes UK and on 6 November via numerous VOD services in the United States. It was also released in DVD format on 21 September in the United Kingdom, on 7 October in France, and will be released on 16 January 2016 in the United States and around the second quarter of 2016 in Germany.

== Reception ==
The film received some positive reviews. It was praised with regards to the relative quality and atmosphere in the movie when compared to its "shoestring budget".

== Sequel ==
A sequel is currently in pre-production in Sheffield, UK.
