= Hammarskjöld (film) =

2023 film

- Directed by: Per Fly
- Written by: Ulf Ryberg; Per Fly
- Produced by: Patrick Ryborn
- Starring: Mikael Persbrandt
- Cinematography: John Christian Rosenlund
- Edited by: Fredrik Morheden
- Music by: Raymond Enoksen
- Release date: 25 December 2023
- Running time: 114 minutes
- Country: Sweden
- Language: Swedish

Hammarskjöld is a 2023 Swedish biographical drama film directed by Per Fly. It is based on the final weeks of former UN Secretary-General Dag Hammarskjöld.

Hammarskjöld had its world premiere at the 53rd International Film Festival Rotterdam in 2024.

== Plot ==
At the turn of the 1960s, renowned diplomat and United Nations Secretary-General Dag Hammarskjöld is confronted with the civil conflict in the Congo. Having only recently gained independence from Belgium, the Congo faces a two-sided struggle: on one side is Congolese Prime Minister Patrice Lumumba, backed by the Soviet Union; on the other, Katanga secessionist Moïse Tshombe, supported by the Belgian-backed mining company Union Minière du Haut-Katanga. Hammarskjöld, who strongly favors decolonization, sets his sights on a two-point goal: first, to strike a diplomatic bargain between Lumumba and Tshombe; and second, to expel Belgian corporate interests from the country.

As tensions progress, Hammarskjöld learns from Congo's UN attaché Conor O'Brien that Tshombe has begun a genocidal campaign against Katanga's indigenous Baluba tribe, tacitly supported by Union Minière. By July 1960, Tshombe declares Katanga independent from Congo, compelling Lumumba to plead with Hammarskjöld for a UN military intervention to save the country, which Hammarskjöld refuses. Several months later, Lumumba is abducted to Katanga, where Tshombe executes him. Hammarskjöld only later learns of this development during a meeting of the UN Security Council. Lumumba's execution sparks international outrage, which stirs the Soviet Union to call for Hammarskjöld's removal. Privately, Hammarskjöld shifts away from dialogue toward intervention, which he discusses during a meeting with U.S. president-elect John F. Kennedy.

At the 15th UN General Assembly, Soviet premier Nikita Khrushchev publicly demands Hammarskjöld's resignation. In response, Hammarskjöld delivers a defiant rebuttal, vowing to continue serving for the cause of peace. With the speech a success, Hammarskjöld travels to Sweden for a respite, where he reunites with his old romantic interest, Peter Levin. However, he returns prematurely when O'Brien informs him that Katanga-based Belgian mercenaries have launched attacks on UN troops. In response, the UN launches Operation Rum Punch in August 1961 to arrest and expel the mercenaries, succeeding and subsequently forcing Tshombe into peace negotiations, although he soon reneges.

Alone, Hammarskjöld finds his personal life in turmoil as he is forced to step back from Levin after learning that the latter has been charged with homosexuality, compounded by the death of his beloved monkey, Greenback. Despite these troubles, he launches Operation Morthor in September 1961 with the aim of taking Katanga by force. The Kennedy administration intercepts his plans and, believing the new action to be rash, discreetly informs Tshombe. Morthor ends in disaster, with UN troops are ambushed by secessionist forces with illicitly procured fighter jets.

Frustrated, Hammarskjöld and his aide Bill Ronallo travel to Congo, facing criticism for the failed operation. Privately, Hammarskjöld learns the British have convinced Tshombe to negotiate a ceasefire scheduled in Ndola, Northern Rhodesia. The UN charters a Transair Douglas DC-6 for the negotiations but fails to secure air escorts, worrying Ronallo about Hammarskjöld’s safety. Hammarskjöld prepares for the trip and receives a heartfelt letter from Levin, professing his care. Touched, Hammarskjöld writes a response before departing.

Unbeknownst to him, Union Minière has hired new mercenaries to track his movements and prepare to intercept his actions. Moments before landing at Ndola, the DC-6 is shot down by a mercenary-operated fighter jet, killing both Hammarskjöld and Ronallo. Hammarskjöld's death is met with worldwide grief and shock, deeply affecting Levin, who receives Hammarskjöld's letter addressing his repressed longing for him. Elsewhere, Hammarskjöld’s private secretary Hanna finds his collection of self-introspective poems, which are later published as the book Vägmärken.

The film’s concluding intertitles reveal that Hammarskjöld was posthumously awarded the Nobel Peace Prize for his efforts toward peace. The mysterious circumstances of his death are noted, alongside the fact that his objective of expelling Belgian interests from Congo was realized in 1963.

== Cast ==
- Mikael Persbrandt as Dag Hammarskjöld
- Francis Chouler as Bill Ranallo
- Cian Barry as Wieschhoff
- Hakeem Kae-Kazim as Moise Tshombe
- Colin Salmon as Ralph Bunche
- Sara Soulié as Hanna
- Adam Neill as Lord Lansdowne
- Celine Tshika as Ruth Tshombe
- Thure Lindhardt as Peter Levin
- Jordan Duvigneau as Patrice Lumumba
- Seán Duggan as Conor O'Brien
- Vasiliy Mishchenko as Nikita Khrushchev
- Caspar Phillipson as John F. Kennedy
- David James as Congo Red
- Jacques Adriaanse as Donald Smith
- Norman Anstey as Hammarskjöld's butler
- Lucas Lynggaard Tønnesen as Young Peter Levin
- Edvin Endre as Young Dag Hammarskjöld
- Daniel Barnett as British Ambassador
- Tom Hale as US Ambassador
- Eduard Jörgen as Chilean ambassador
- Björn Kinder as Ambassador -Under-Secretary
- Lars Ulrich Larsson as US deputy ambassador
- Jean Teplitsky as French ambassador

== Production ==
The film was directed by Per Fly and produced by Patrick Ryborn. The screenplay was written by Ulf Ryberg, who drew inspiration from historical accounts of Hammarskjöld's life and the circumstances surrounding his untimely death. The production sought to recreate the tension and uncertainty of the Cold War period, with meticulous attention to detail in the film's setting and character portrayals.

== Reception ==
Upon its release, Hammarskjöld received praise for its compelling narrative and strong performances, particularly in the portrayal of Dag Hammarskjöld. Critics highlighted the film's ability to blend historical drama with suspense, creating a thought-provoking depiction of a significant moment in history. The film also sparked renewed interest in the events leading up to Hammarskjöld's death, with some commentators discussing its implications in the context of modern geopolitics.

The film received negative reviews for glossing over its Congo Crisis controversies.

== Historical Context ==
Dag Hammarskjöld was the second Secretary-General of the United Nations, serving from 1953 until his death in 1961. His tenure was marked by efforts to navigate the complexities of the Cold War, and he played a crucial role in establishing the UN's peacekeeping operations. The film Hammarskjöld touches on these aspects of his career, particularly his involvement in the Congo Crisis, which ultimately led to the mission depicted in the film.
