= Paul Mercurio =

Australian politician, actor, and dancer

Paul Mercurio AM MP
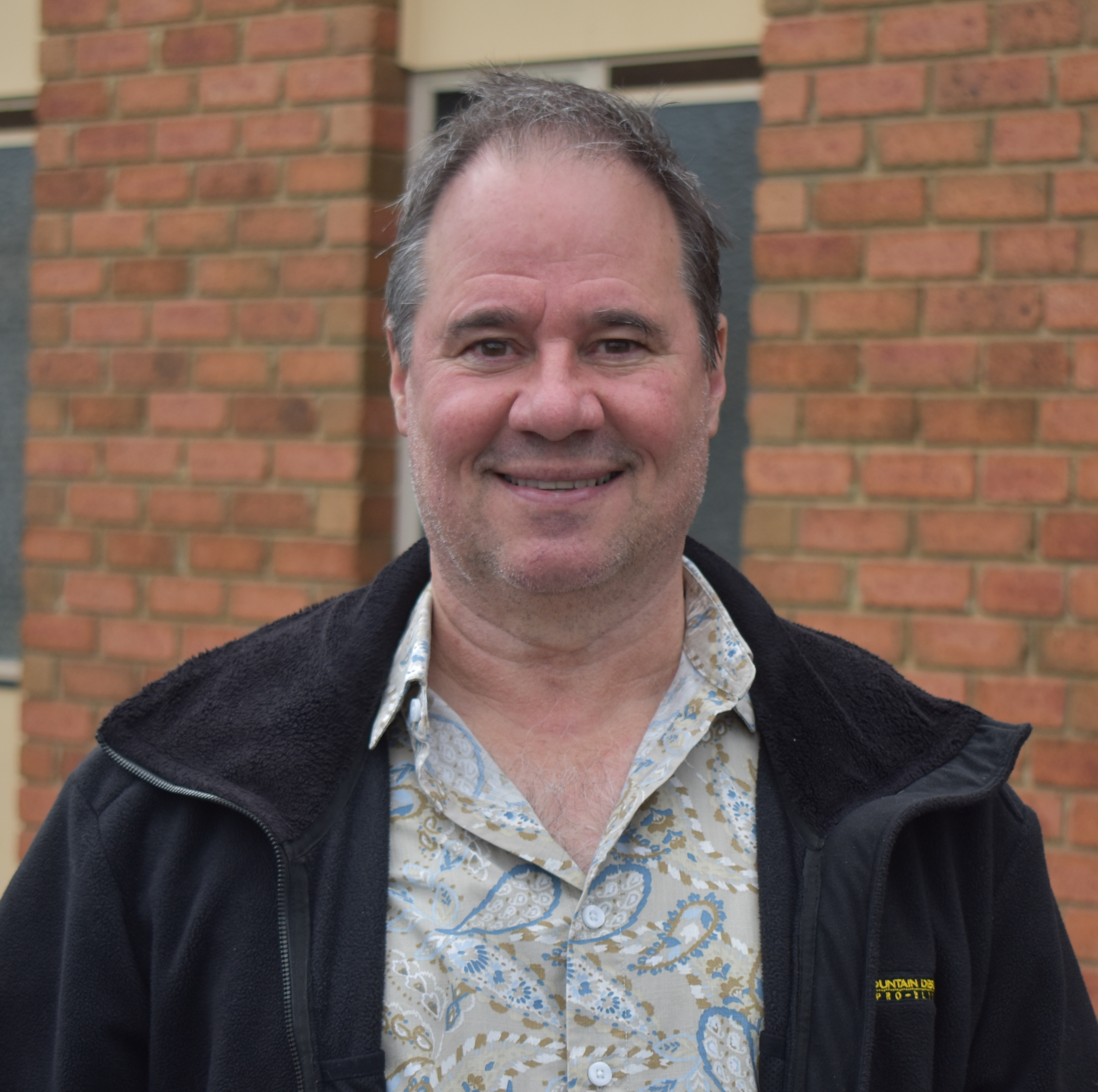
- Mercurio in 2025

Member of the Victorian Legislative Assembly for Hastings
- Incumbent
- Assumed office 26 November 2022
- Preceded by: Neale Burgess

Councillor of the Mornington Peninsula Shire Council for Watson Ward
- In office 23 October 2020 – 26 November 2022
- Preceded by: Julie Edge
- Succeeded by: Kate Roper

Personal details
- Born: Paul Joseph Mercurio; 31 March 1963 (age 63) Swan Hill, Victoria, Australia
- Party: Labor
- Spouse: Andrea Toy (m. 1987)
- Children: 3
- Parent: Gus Mercurio (father)
- Occupation: Actor; Dancer; Choreographer; Television presenter; Politician

Paul Joseph Mercurio AM (born 31 March 1963) is an Australian actor, choreographer, dancer, TV presenter and politician. Mercurio is best known for his lead role in the 1992 film Strictly Ballroom and his role as a judge on the TV series Dancing with the Stars.

He has been an Australian Labor Party member of the Victorian Legislative Assembly since 2022, representing the electorate of Hastings.

== Early life ==
Mercurio was born in Swan Hill, Victoria in March 1963; his father was an American character actor and boxer Gus Mercurio. Paul began ballet at nine. When his parents separated in 1969, he moved to Perth, Western Australia, with his mother, where he grew up in housing commission properties. He attended John Curtin Senior High School, now known as John Curtin College of the Arts, where there is a theatre named after him. He credits his theatre arts teacher for inspiring him to follow his dream. Mercurio focused on acting during his high school years but after he graduated, he caught the Indian Pacific train from Perth back to Melbourne where he studied at the Australian Ballet School.

By the age of 19 in 1982, he was Principal Dancer with the Sydney Dance Company—a position he held for ten years. During this time, he was commissioned to choreograph six works performed by the company.

== Entertainment career ==
=== Feature films ===
Mercurio made his film debut in Baz Luhrmann's breakout film Strictly Ballroom, receiving an Australian Film Institute Award nomination in 1993. Mercurio was a choreographer on the film. For his performance in Strictly Ballroom, Mercurio was also nominated for an AACTA Award for Best Actor in a Leading Role in 1992, losing to Russell Crowe. Flamenco dancer Antonio Vargas, the actor who played Fran's father, also choreographed scenes in the film.

Mercurio's other film credits include: Exit to Eden, Back of Beyond, Così, Red Ribbon Blues, Welcome to Woop Woop, The Dark Planet, The First 9½ Weeks, Kick and Sydney – A Story of a City. He starred, wrote, choreographed, produced and directed the short film Spilt Milk. Most recently, Mercurio has taken roles in independent films, such as Hunting for Shadows and A Silent Agreement with director Davo Hardy.

In 2019, Mercurio appeared in a supporting role as Sal in Promised (2019), a film directed and co-produced by Nick Conidi, and starring Tina Arena, Antoniette Iesue and Daniel Berini. The film was released in Australia on 24 October 2019.

Baz Luhrmann expressed some interest in using Mercurio in Moulin Rouge to Mercurio's agent, but after a series of failed attempts to speak to Luhrmann personally, Mercurio found out that there was no role for him in the movie via the production company. He has not appeared in any other Luhrmann films and only appears briefly in Disc 4 of Red Curtain Trilogy as a pixelated image.

Concerned about being typecast early on in his film career, Mercurio turned down the role of Adam Whitely (which instead went to Guy Pearce), in the 1994 film, The Adventures of Priscilla, Queen of the Desert.

=== Television ===
Mercurio made his TV debut in a documentary on his life called Life's Burning Desire in 1992. He starred in the lead role of Joseph in the Emmy Award-winning US TV mini-series The Bible: Joseph in 1995. Later, he joined the ensemble cast for the 1998 miniseries drama The Day of the Roses, depicting the 1977 Granville railway disaster, for which he received a Logie nomination. Throughout the 1990s, Mercurio guest-starred in Australian TV shows including Blue Heelers, All Saints, Murder Call, Medivac, Heartbreak High and Water Rats.

Mercurio was a judge on the Australian version of Dancing with the Stars until August 2008, when he was dropped from the judging panel because he was deemed "too nice" for television. He was also a judge on the New Zealand version. From 2008 to 2010 he hosted a series called Mercurio's Menu where he travelled Australia, cooking in different locations.

=== Dance and choreography ===
From 1982 until 1992, Mercurio toured with Sydney Dance Company both nationally and internationally, performing as a principal dancer and choreographing. After leaving the Sydney Dance Company, Mercurio founded the Australian Choreographic Ensemble in 1992, where he was the Director, Principal Dancer and Principal Choreographer until 1998.

Mercurio continues to dance and choreograph professionally. He has worked as a choreographer on five films, including Strictly Ballroom and the Will Smith movie I, Robot. He has choreographed an American TV campaign for Coca-Cola, the Harry M. Miller production of Jesus Christ Superstar and Annie Get Your Gun as well as numerous other stage productions. In January 2004, he appeared on stage in The Full Monty.

He received a Mo Award for Dance Performer of the Year 1992, and was nominated in 2004 for a Helpmann Award for his choreography for the musical Annie Get Your Gun.

=== Food ===
Mercurio began brewing his own beer in 1988. He then hosted three cooking television series – Tasmania's Food Trail (from 2006, for two seasons), Mercurio's Menu (from 2008 to 2010, for three seasons) and New Zealand on a Plate (2011). Following this, he appeared on the cooking segments of numerous live daytime TV shows, including a featured chef spot on Channel Nine's The Morning Show in 2013.

In 2009, Mercurio released a cookbook called Mercurio's Menu, based on his TV series, as well as “Cooking with Beer”, which were both best-sellers. In 2015, he released a third cookbook, “Kitchen Mojo”.

In 2005, Mercurio released his own beer in Victoria, and since then has held beer dinners and beer cooking demos and been a judge for international beer competitions. In 2016, he brewed Australia's first Aphrodisiac Beer "Ye Ole Horney Ale", together with BentSpoke Brewery. He then opened his own beer café in 2014, produced a range of meat rubs and condiments and formed his own company "Beerlicious". He has since cooked in restaurants and at markets and festivals.

== Political career ==
Mercurio at a Hastings forum in 2026

Mercurio was elected as a councillor for Mornington Peninsula Shire in November 2020, representing the Watson ward.

Mercurio was preselected as the Labor candidate for the district of Hastings in December 2021. The Hastings district covers the eastern Mornington Peninsula and French Island. While Hastings was won by the Liberal Party at the 2018 Victorian state election, an electoral redistribution meant that the seat notionally favoured Labor by a margin of 0.01 percent. Neale Burgess, MP for Hastings since 2006, did not contest the 2022 state election, with Briony Hutton selected as the Liberal candidate for the seat. Mercurio stated that he had been approached by both the Liberal and Labor parties to stand as a candidate, but felt a stronger affinity towards Labor due to their support for the arts, women's equality, and LGBTQ rights. Mercurio took leave from his council position to stand in the state election. Hastings was one of a handful of seats that was too close to call in the immediate aftermath of the 26 November state election, although Mercurio led in the initial count. On 2 December, ABC election analyst Antony Green called the seat of Hastings for Mercurio. Despite polling behind Hutton on first preferences, Mercurio received 51.35 percent in the final two-party-preferred count. Mercurio's win triggered a March 2023 by-election in Watson ward.

Mercurio announced in 2025 that funding would be granted through the state budget for bus upgrades in the Mornington Peninsula, including the creation of a new route that would run across the peninsula from Hastings to Mornington. The service commenced running as Route 886 on 5 July 2026, with Mercurio boarding the inaugural service. It is the first regular cross-peninsula public transport service since the closure of the Mornington railway line to commuter traffic in 1981.

Mercurio is standing again for Hastings at the 2026 state election.

== Personal life ==
Mercurio has been married to his wife Andrea (who was a ballerina with The Australian Ballet and Sydney Dance Company) since 1987, and together they have three children: Emily, Elise and Erin. The oldest is a stage manager, the middle is a musical theatre actor and writer, and the youngest is a vet nurse and performs as a pop singer.

He appeared on the Australian version of the television show Who Do You Think You Are? in 2012, in which he discovered that his grandfather was a member of the Milwaukee division of Cosa Nostra (the Sicilian mafia) in the 1950s. Mercurio has reflected on this legacy in subsequent interviews and spoken about the effect it has had on his father, and his relationship with his father.

In 2000, Mercurio's brother Michael took his own life in his early 30s.

In December 2022, Mercurio was hospitalised with complications from atrial fibrillation following his election win.

== Credits ==
=== Film ===
==== As actor ====
Year	Title	Role	Notes
1985	Boxes		TV movie
1992	Strictly Ballroom	Scott Hastings	Feature film
1994	Exit to Eden	Elliot Slater	Feature film
1995	Joseph	Joseph	Miniseries
1995	Back of Beyond	Tom McGregor	Feature film
1996	Cosi	Mental Patient (uncredited)	Feature film
1996	Red Ribbon Blues	Troy	Feature film
1996	Spilt Milk		Short film
1996	Museum of Love	Charlie	Short film
1997	Welcome to Woop Woop	Midget	Feature film
1997	Dark Planet	Hawke	Feature film
1998	The First 9½ Weeks	Matt Wade	Direct-to-video film
1999	Kick	David Knight	Feature film
1999	Sydney – A Story of a City	Archaeologist Marco	Short film
2001	The Finder	Leo Natoli	TV movie
2003	Code 11-14	Carl Reese	TV movie
2007	Razzle Dazzle: A Journey into Dance	Self	Feature film
2016	Hunting for Shadows	James Beasley	Feature film
2017	A Silent Agreement	Gareth Donahue	Feature film
2019	Promised	Sal	Feature film

==== As choreographer/crew ====
Year	Title	Role	Notes
1992	Strictly Ballroom	Additional Choreography	Feature film
1996	Spilt Milk	Writer / Choreographer / Produced / Director	Short film
1999	Kick	Choreographer	Feature film
2002	Garage Days	Choreographer	Feature film
2004	I, Robot	Movement Consultant	Feature film

=== Television ===
==== As actor ====
Year	Title	Role	Notes
1992	Life's Burning Desire	Self	TV documentary
1995	Joseph	Joseph	Miniseries, 2 episodes
1996	The Great War and the Shaping of the 20th Century	Cyril Lawrence	TV documentary series, 2 episodes
1996	Time Out for Serious Fun	Presenter	TV series
1996–1997	Medivac	Roy Fields	TV series, 11 episodes
1997	Water Rats	Les Johnson	TV series, season 2, episode 2: "Closed Circuit"
1997	Heartbreak High	Blair Baker	TV series, season 5, episode 21
1998	The Day of the Roses	Bryan Gordon	Miniseries, 2 episodes
1999	Pig's Breakfast		4 episodes
1999; 2003	Blue Heelers	Henry Townsend / Alec McKinley	TV series, 2 episodes
2000	Murder Call	Travis Draper	TV series, season 3, episode 16: "Scent of Evil"
2000	All Saints	Oscar Franklin	TV series, season 3, episode 38: "Fate Dances with Lady Luck"
2004	Through My Eyes	Max Cromwell	Miniseries, 2 episodes
2004–2007	Dancing with the Stars	Judge	TV series, seasons 1–7
2006	Tasmania's Food Trail	Host	TV series, seasons 1–2
2007	City Homicide	D'Arcy Carlton	TV series, season 1, episode 5: "The Ripe Fruits in the Garden"
2008–2011	Mercurio's Menu	Host	TV series, 4 seasons, 39 episodes
2010	Who Do You Think You Are?	Special Guest / Subject	TV series, season 3, episode 5
2011	Dancing with the Stars - New Zealand	Judge	TV series, season 13
2011	New Zealand on a Plate	Presenter	TV series
2012	The Morning Show	Featured Chef	TV series
2013	Mornings with David and Sonia	Presenter	TV series
2014	Creative Kids	Guest	TV series, episode 5: "How to Be a Dancer"
2019; 2020; 2022	Neighbours	Grant Hargreaves	TV series, 15 episodes

==== As crew ====
Year	Title	Role	Notes
2016	West of the West: Tales from California's Channel Islands	Assistant Editor	TV series

=== Stage ===
==== As performer ====
Year	Title	Role	Venue / Co.
1983	Risks: Programme 2	Dancer	Sailors’ Home Theatre, Sydney with Sydney Dance Company
1983–1984	Some Rooms	The Voyager (dancer)	Sydney Opera House, State Theatre, Melbourne, Theatre Royal, Hobart with Sydney Dance Company
1986; 1987	After Venice	Tadzio (dancer)	Playhouse, Melbourne, Sydney Opera House with Sydney Dance Company
1987	Shining	Dancer	Theatre Royal, Hobart with Sydney Dance Company
1988	Kraanerg	Dancer	Sydney Opera House with Sydney Dance Company
1989	Evening Suite / Wanda in the Awkward Age / Dancing With I / Sixty a Minute / Song of the Night	Dancer	Sydney Opera House
1989	Tabula Rasa / Daphnis and Chloe	Cupid (dancer)	Sydney Opera House with Sydney Dance Company
1993	Australian Choreographic Ensemble	Dancer	Theatre Royal, Hobart
1993	Dancing With I	Dancer	Universal Theatre, Melbourne with Australian Choreographic Ensemble
1993	Imprint	Dancer	Enmore Theatre, Sydney with Australian Choreographic Ensemble
1996	Thwack / Into Dharma / Master Plan / Dancing with the Clown / KYU / Radical Study / Table Talk	Dancer	Sydney Opera House with Sydney Dance Company
1999	A Passionate Woman		
2003	The Full Monty	Ethan Girard (actor)	State Theatre, Melbourne

==== As director ====
Year	Title	Role	Venue / Co.
1987	Sheherezade / Late Afternoon of a Faun / Rumours 1 / Afterworlds	Dance Director	Sydney Opera House with Sydney Dance Company
1990	In The Company of Wo/Men	Director	Wharf Theatre, Sydney with Sydney Dance Company

==== As choreographer ====
Year	Title	Role	Venue / Co.
Pre–1981	Just Another Poor Boy	Choreographer	West Australian Ballet
1983	Risks: Programme 2	Choreographer	Sailors' Home Theatre, Sydney with Sydney Dance Company
1989	Sydney Dance Company 1989	Choreographer	Sydney Opera House
1989	Evening Suite / Wanda in the Awkward Age / Dancing With I / Sixty a Minute / Song of the Night	Choreographer	Sydney Opera House
1989	Gala Program: The Choreographer Dances	Choreographer	Sydney Opera House with Sydney Dance Company
1989	Waiting / Arbos / Happy Trials / Song of the Night	Choreographer	Sydney Opera House with Sydney Dance Company
1989	Cafe	Choreographer	Wharf Theatre, Sydney with Sydney Dance Company
1992	Jesus Christ Superstar	Choreographer	Sydney Entertainment Centre, Flinders Park, Melbourne, Brisbane Entertainment Centre, Perth Entertainment Centre, Adelaide Entertainment Centre with Harry M. Miller
1992	Edging	Choreographer	Sydney Opera House
1992	3 Premieres	Choreographer	Sydney Opera House with Sydney Dance Company
1992	Monkey See / Piano Sonata / Edgeing / Mercurio	Choreographer	Sydney Opera House with Sydney Dance Company
1992–1993	Contact	Choreographer	The Performance Space, Sydney, Theatre Royal, Hobart, Universal Theatre, Melbourne
1993	Australian Choreographic Ensemble	Choreographer	Theatre Royal, Hobart
1993	The Sugar Mother	Choreographer	Bridge Theatre, Sydney, Sydney Opera House with Theatre South
1993	Waiting	Choreographer	Universal Theatre, Melbourne with Australian Choreographic Ensemble
1993	Dancing With I	Choreographer	Universal Theatre, Melbourne with Australian Choreographic Ensemble
1993	Imprint	Choreographer	Enmore Theatre, Sydney with Australian Choreographic Ensemble with Australian Choreographic Ensemble
1994	Dance Week	Choreographer	Sydney Opera House with Ausdance
1996	The Protecting Veil	Choreographer	Sydney Opera House with Sydney Dance Company
1996	Thwack / Into Dharma / Master Plan / Dancing with the Clown / KYU / Radical Study / Table Talk	Choreographer	Sydney Opera House with Sydney Dance Company
1997; 1999	Bar Blu	Choreographer	Tasdance
2004	Annie Get Your Gun	Choreographer	State Theatre, Melbourne with The Production Company

=== TVC ===
Year	Title	Role	Notes
	Coca-Cola	Choreographer	American TV campaign

== Awards, nominations & honours ==
Year	Work	Award	Category	Result
1992	Paul Mercurio	Mo Awards	Dance Performance of the Year	Won
1992	Strictly Ballroom	AFI Awards	Best Actor in a Lead Role	Nominated
1999	The Day of the Roses	41st Annual Logie Awards	Most Outstanding Actor	Nominated
2005	Annie Get Your Gun	Helpmann Awards	Best Choreography in a Musical	Nominated
2017	A Silent Agreement	Dreamanila International Film Festival	Jury Award – Best Lead Actor	Nominated
2018	A Silent Agreement	Sydney Indie Film Festival	Best Male Lead Actor	Nominated
2020	Paul Mercurio	2020 Australia Day Honours	Member of the Order of Australia	Honoured

Victorian Legislative Assembly
Preceded by Neale Burgess	Member for Hastings; 2022–present	Incumbent
