= The Day of the Roses =

- DVD cover
- Written by: John Misto
- Directed by: Peter Fisk
- Starring: Rebecca Gibney; Paul Mercurio; Stephen Curry
- Music by: Roger Mason
- Country of origin: Australia
- Original language: English

Production
- Producers: Tony Cavanaugh; Simone North; Antonia Barnard
- Cinematography: Steven Arnold
- Editors: Andrew MacNeil; Shawn Seet
- Running time: 220 minutes
- Production company: Liberty Productions

Original release
- Release: 11 January 1998 – 1998

The Day of the Roses is a two-part Australian television mini-series, a docu-drama directed by Peter Fisk, based on the events of the 1977 Granville railway disaster. The film was made in 1998 and runs over 3.5 hours. Described as "a dramatic depiction of real events", it was based on a manuscript by Murray Hubbard and Ray Connor. It won the 1999 AACTA Award for Best Telefeature, Mini Series or Short Run Series.

== Plot ==
Part 1 starts with roses being dropped on the track to commemorate those lost then shifts to the aftermath of the wreck where first responders are arriving at the scene. Five months later, the coroner, Tom Weir, brings in Boris Osman, an engineer to help him investigate the crash and Weir begins to be pressured by the state-owned rail company to conclude his report quickly. After failing to access the damaged train, Osman thinks it's because the investigation will have to disclose why the tracks that caused the wreck, and the train itself, were in such bad shape. Osman thinks it was caused by the politicians in office (a confusing reference since the Wran Labor Government had taken office in May 1976, just 8 months prior to the accident, and the attempt by Liberal Opposition Leader Sir Eric Willis to blame the new government for the disaster lead directly to his own resignation) allowing the rail system to deteriorate, and his investigations reveal that the overweight bridge was recently hit twice before. Osman also learns this is the third time this locomotive went off the rails. Pressure begins to be brought on the coroner from Chief Stipendiary Magistrate Murray Farquhar to stop asking to look at the train, but he decides to use his authority to force the rail company to let Osman examine the locomotive.

The inquest begins, with Osman recounting how the tragedy happened early on 18 January, alternating with flashbacks of the stories of some passengers who traveled on the ill-fated train, leading up to the depiction of the accident. The train was 3 minutes late at Parramatta and was claimed to be riding faster than normal to make up time (although as verified in the investigation it was in fact 2kmh under the track speed limit, and false and unjustifiable claims it was speeding did immense harm to the driver in his lifetime). Due to worn out track and worn out wheels on the locomotive, it jumps the rails and hits the struts of a bridge, causing it to subsequently collapse on the train. The community springs into action to aid the survivors, although the worst is also shown as looters steal from rescue vehicles too. Several of the rescuers testify at the inquest and recount their actions on the day of the accident.

In Part 2, the inquest, flashbacks, and use of archive news coverage continue. Many rescuers risk their own lives to save the injured. Even when ordered to leave due to the danger of further collapse, many refuse to abandon survivors, and many are traumatized by what they saw. In all, they find 83 dead. Soon Ormond comes under attack for saying that it was the condition of the locomotive's wheels that contributed to the accident, since while $200 million has been allocated to repair the network's tracks, there is no money to also repair the locomotives. The families of the dead try to cope, while Gerry Buchtmann, who went to Granville while on sick leave from his emergency responder job has to fight to keep his job, since the powers that be want to fire him for doing just that. In spite of pressure, the coroner finds that the locomotive's condition contributed to the accident. In an unfortunate jumble of incoherent claims, Osman later learns that even though the rail company knew this type of locomotive was dangerous due to a derailment 11 months before Granville, they took no steps to lower the speed on this line because it came from an electoral district that often decided national elections and the government did not want to anger the voters by making their train late. We return to the memorial service, while on screen captions tell us what happened to some of the people involved in the crash and the investigation.

== Cast ==
- John Bach – Tom Weir, coroner
- Chris Betts – Sgt. Merv Masterson
- Aaron Blabey – Dr John White
- Carol Burns – Greta, Weir's secretary
- Cormac Costello – Michael 'Scotty' McInally, ambulance worker
- Stephen Curry – Rescuer
- Helen Dallimore – Annette Gordon
- Gigi Edgley – Erica Watson
- Rebecca Gibney – Sister Margaret Warby, nurse
- Paul Mercurio – Bryan Gordon
- Heather Mitchell – Margaret Shuttler
- Peter O'Brien – Boris Osman, engineer
- Damian Pike – Constable Garry Raymond
- Wayne Pygram – Sgt. Joe Beecroft
- Jeremy Sims – Gerry Buchtmann
- Georgina Symes – Debbie Skow
- Steven Vidler – Dick Lamb
- Bill Young – Inspector Ray Williams
- Paul Denny – Constable Holman

=== Guest appearances ===
- John Clayton – Murray Farquhuar, Chief Stipendary Magistrate
- Chris Haywood – Informant
- Andrew McFarlane – Public Servant
- Tim Campbell – McCrossan

== Home media ==
The Day of the Roses was released on DVD by Umbrella Entertainment in July 2010.

Title	Format	Ep #	Discs	Region 4 (Australia)	Special features	Distributors
The Day of the Roses	DVD	2 x Feature Episode	02	7 July 2010	None	Umbrella Entertainment
