= Alan Holley =

Australian composer and musician (born 1954)

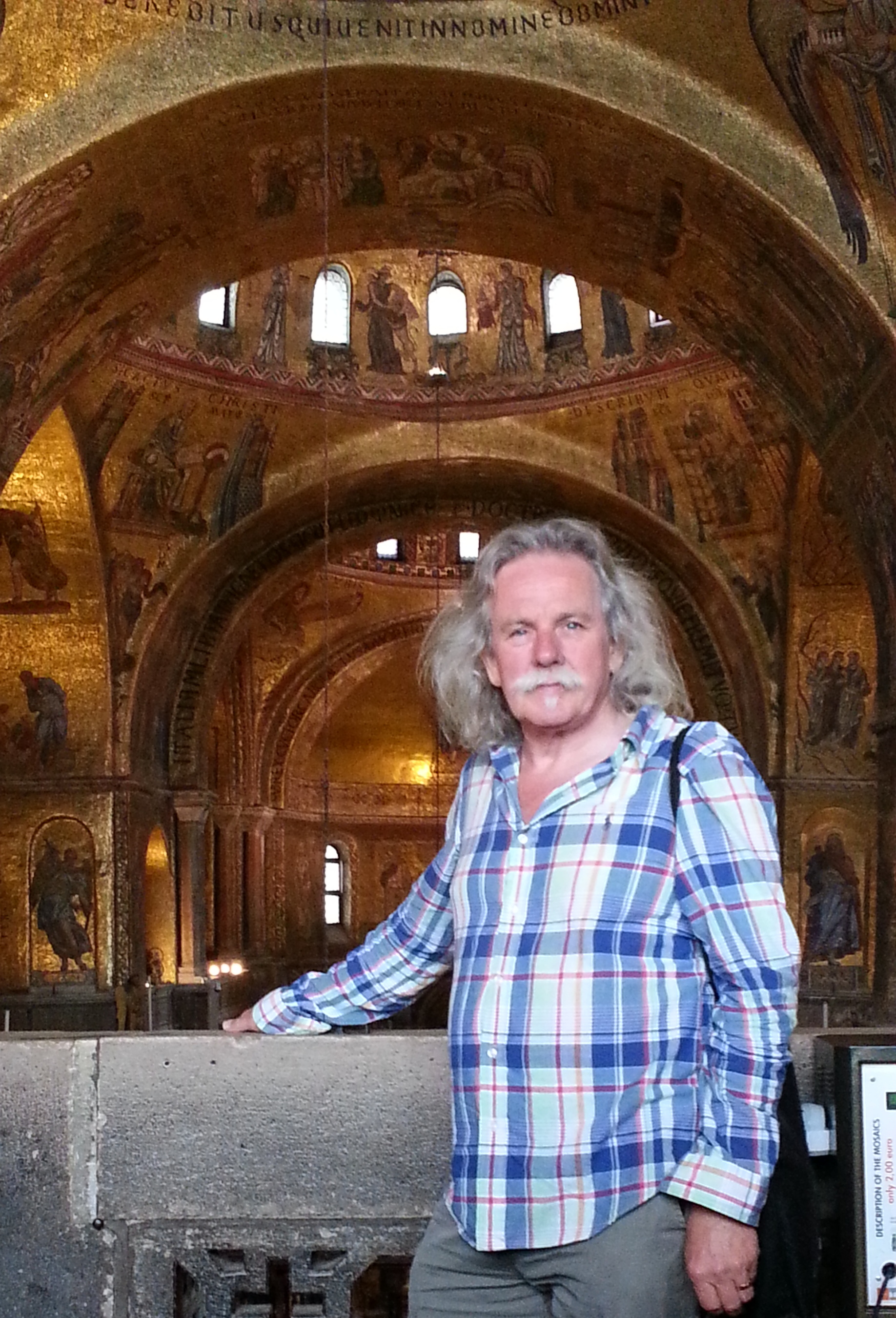
- Alan Holley in 2014

Background information
- Born: 1 October 1954 (age 71); Sydney
- Genres: contemporary classical music
- Occupations: Composer, musician, conductor
- Instrument: Trumpet
- Years active: 1975–present

Alan Holley (born 1 October 1954) is an Australian composer and musician.

== Biography ==
Alan Holley studied composition with Ross Edwards in 1973 at the University in Sydney. After leaving university without completing his Bachelor of Arts degree, Holley joined the new music group AZ Music as a performer (trumpeter) and composer. This group commissioned and performed several of his early works. In 1976 Holley founded MUSED, a new music ensemble which mainly performed music by Sydney composers, and he promoted regular concerts by this group between 1976 and 1981. MUSED also performed works by Holley, and gave him his first experience of conducting.

Holley received an Australia–Japan Foundation Travel Grant in 1977 which enabled him to undertake a two-month study tour attending new music festivals in Japan. The following year he was awarded grants from the Gulbenkian Foundation and the Music Board of the Australia Council to represent Australia at the Gulbenkian Foundation Summer School for Composers and Choreographers at Surrey University in the United Kingdom. Holley was the recipient of Composers' Fellowships from the Music Board of the Australia Council in 1980 and 1982.

He has also built a career for himself as a conductor. After MUSED he conducted community-based orchestras before founding the Northern Chamber Orchestra in 1981. Holley was a participant in the ABC Conductors' Workshops under Werner Andreas Albert with the Queensland Symphony Orchestra in 1985, and again in 1986 with the ABC Sinfonia. In 1986 he founded the new music ensemble, The Gallery Players, and in 1989, the Sydney Bach Orchestra.

Three of his works have been premiered by the Sydney Symphony Orchestra. Doppler's Webb, a trumpet concerto, was premiered in 2005 with soloist Paul Goodchild. A Line of Stars was premiered in 2007, and more recently his oboe concerto A Shaft of Light was premiered with Shefali Proyr as soloist (2015). Additionally, Loaded with Dream (2001) was commissioned by the orchestra for the SSO Fellows.

Alan Holley's compositions include a chamber opera based on the life of Dorothea Mackellar, works for chamber orchestra, for small ensembles, for voice, and for solo instruments.

== Compositions (selection) ==
=== Orchestral ===
- Coasters Retreat (1990)
- My Summer Garden (1999)
- October (2001)
- Chamber Symphony (2003)
- Doppler's Web (trumpet concerto; 2004)
- A Line of Stars (2007)
- A Shaft of Light (oboe concerto; 2015)

=== Concertante ===
- The Winged Viola for viola and ensemble (2004)

=== Chamber and instrumental music ===
- Birds of Opal for solo flute (1982)
- Amaryllis for flute duet (1983)
- Still Life for trumpet and piano (1986)
- Zoastra for solo clarinet (1991)
- Birdwing for trumpet and piano (1992)
- Endless Days for 2 flutes, 3 violins, viola, cello and double bass (1993)
- Govett's Leap for 2 flutes, clarinet, 2 violins, viola and cello (1994)
- Summer Bird for solo flute (1995)
- Raven Clouds for violin and piano (1995)
- August for solo flute (2002)
- Auric for solo trombone (2004)
- Canzona for Ligeti for horn, 2 trumpets, trombone and tuba (2006)
- Ophelia Songs for trumpet and piano (2009)
- Concorno for solo horn (2010)
- Ornothologia for solo trumpet (2010)
- Still Road for horn and piano (2013)

=== Vocal ===
- Ophelia for soprano with chamber ensemble (1997)
- "And The Rain" (2017)

=== Opera ===
- Dorothea (1988)
