= Branko Ištvančić =

Croatian film director (born 1967)

Branko Ištvančić (born April 5, 1967) is a Croatian film director.

== Biography ==
Born in Subotica, Ištvančić graduated from the Academy of Dramatic Art, University of Zagreb in 1999. Since 2003, he has been employed at the Croatian Radiotelevision, working as a director of documentary films, educational programs, and television series and films.

Ištvančić's award-winning documentary The Cormorant Scarecrow (1998) has been described by Croatian film critics as one of the best Croatian documentary films of the 1990s.

His feature film debut, The Ghost in the Swamp, placed 2nd among domestic films in the Croatian box office in 2006.

In 2012, he created a film called Od zrna do slike (Serbian: Од зрна до слике, 'From Grain to Painting'), about the Bunjevci Croatian straw artists, Ana Milodanović and Josefa Skenderović. The film won the Gold Camera for best documentary at its Los Angeles premiere and in 2013, at the International Festival of Ethnographic Film in Romania, won Grand Prize for Best Film.

== Selected filmography ==
=== Short films ===
- Saying Goodbye (Rastanak, 1993)
- Freeze Frame (Zamrznuti kadar, 1999)

=== Documentary films ===
- The Cormorant Scarecrow (1998)
- Wellman (2003)
- From Grain to Painting (2012)

=== Feature films ===
- The Ghost in the Swamp (2006)
- The Bridge at the End of the World (2013)
