= In Search of Marco Polo =

- Genre: Documentary
- Written by: Miro Branković
- Directed by: Miro Branković
- Presented by: Miro Branković
- Narrated by: Franjo Kuhar
- Country of origin: Croatia
- Original language: Croatian
- No. of episodes: 8

Production
- Producers: Anto Jurić; Miroslav Rezić
- Cinematography: Dragan Ruljančić
- Running time: 50 min

Original release
- Network: HRT 1
- Release: 13 February – 4 April 2013

In Search of Marco Polo (Croatian: U potrazi za Markom Polom) is a Croatian documentary television miniseries written and directed by Miro Branković.

== Synopsis ==
By filming on the actual locations traversed by Marco Polo, the In Search of Marco Polo brings to life the authenticity of the local peoples from the standpoints of ethnology, historiography, culture and economics. It follows the exact route depicted in his book, Il Milione, documenting the peoples, customs and cultures along the way to bring into sharp relief the cultural differences within the Asian mainland.

Viewers are introduced to their development, becoming familiar with three completely different and, to us, relatively unknown spheres of civilisation and religion—Arabic Islam, Indian Hinduism and Oriental Buddhism. The host takes us through regions and cultures that may seem exotic—and, at times, dreamlike—in our search for the evidence of Marco Polo's passage. Interviews with common folk bring to light amazing facts and tales of unfamiliar customs, beliefs, crafts, attitudes and value systems that have developed in Asia over the millennia. The series' depiction of these faraway lands is based on contrast. Magnificent edifices like temples or palaces are juxtaposed with the details from a masterfully crafted vase. The war tactics of the Mongolian army, the greatest military force of its time, are contrasted with the life of today's Mongols in their quaint yurts. The closed Burma (Myanmar) is compared with the opening of China. Each episode forms a whole connected by the thread of Marco Polo, with the entire miniseries linking not only Polo's travels, but the world's largest circles of civilisation (European, Arabic, Indian and Oriental).

Finally, the series explores the sensations of wonder and magic, which have changed little in the seven centuries since Marco Polo's time.

== Awards ==
- Winner, Best Croatian Film, Zagreb Tourfilm Festival, 2013
- Winner, Best documentary Film, Zagreb Tourfilm festival 2013
- Winner, Best Cinematography, Zagreb Tourfilm festival 2013
- Discography Award Porin in the category for the Best album of original music for theatre, film and /or TV, Zagreb 2013
- Best Film Winner, Tourfilm festival Karlovy Vary 2013.
- Golden Award Winner in the category of Culture & Traditions, International Tourism Film Festival in Baku 2013
- Best festival film, ITF'CRO-Solin 2013
- Second Award, Art Film Festival Telč 2014.
- Special Mention, East Coast of Europe, Veliko Tarnovo, 2014.
- Award "Silver Winner" in the category "History and Civilisation", Cannes Corporate Media and TV Awards 2014
- Jury Award, for the affirmation of values religious and cultural heritage, Jahorina Film Festival 2014
- Award for Best film for Television, Documentarts festival, Bucharest 2014
