= Monster Island (2019 film) =

2019 television monster film by The Asylum

- Poster
- Written by: Mark Atkins
- Directed by: Mark Atkins
- Starring: Eric Roberts; Chris Fisher; Adrian Bouchet; Meghan Oberholzer; Natalie Robbie; Donna Cormack
- Theme music composer: Christopher Cano; Chris Ridenhour; Eliza Swenson
- Country of origin: United States
- Original language: English

Production
- Editors: Mark Atkins; Marq Morrison; Erica Steele
- Running time: 90 minutes
- Production company: The Asylum

Original release
- Network: Syfy
- Release: June 1, 2019

Monster Island is a 2019 television science-fiction monster film produced by The Asylum. Keeping with The Asylum's mainstay theme of mockbusters, it was released in the same year as the 2019 monster film Godzilla: King of the Monsters.

Monster Island first premiered on June 1, 2019 on the Syfy channel, exactly one day after Godzilla: King of the Monsters.

== Plot ==
A team of geologists collaborate with the New Zealand Coast Guard in fighting against two kaiju in battle with one another: a giant starfish dubbed Tengu that spawns dragon-like offspring, and the golem-like Walking Mountain.

== Cast ==
- Eric Roberts as General Horne
- Toshi Toda as Lieutenant Maxwell
- Adrian Bouchet as Billy Ford
- Natalie Robbie as Sarah Murray
- Donna Cormack Thomson as Cherise Ramon
- Chris Fisher as Riley James
- Jonathan Pienaar as Captain Mato
- Margot Wood as Rena Hangaroa
- Meghan Oberholzer as Susan Meyerhold
- Ryan Kruger as Navigator Thompson
- Lindsay Sullivan as Captain Hansen

== Production ==
Monster Island was filmed in Cape Town, South Africa; Los Angeles, California; and New Zealand.

== Release ==
Monster Island aired twice in its television premiere on June 1, 2019. Exactly twelve days later, it was released on DVD on June 13. Three months later, Monster Island was available on SVOD on September 13.

== Reception ==
Phil Wheat of Nerdly said of the film: "I'm not going to lie, this is yet another low-budget CGI-filled film from The Asylum and if you don’t like that sort of thing you’re not going to like this. But… but, if you're like me and live for these cheesy, gloriously over-the-top, B-movies then there's a LOT to recommend about Monster Island."
