= Mystery Files (British TV series) =

Mystery Files is a television series broadcast on National Geographic Channel in the United Kingdom in February 2010. It aimed to shed light on some of the great mysteries of history. It is narrated by Struan Rodger.

== Episodes ==
=== Season One ===
The first season is led by Nostradamus, Jack the Ripper, Robin Hood, Princes in the Tower, Rasputin, Billy the Kid, King Arthur, Leonardo da Vinci, Abraham Lincoln, Cleopatra, Man in the Iron Mask, Romanovs and Joan of Arc.

=== Season Two ===
The second season is led by The Birth of Christ, Hitler, Marco Polo, Alexander the Great, Taj Mahal, Isaac Newton, Saladin, Captain Kidd, Pope Joan, Sitting Bull, The Virgin Queen, Zorro and Lawrence of Arabia.
