= Combined Independent Colleges =

- Merged into: AIC and GPS (2014)
- Formation: 1957
- Headquarters: Queensland, Australia

The Combined Independent Colleges (CIC) was a former junior sports association of 14 independent schools in south-east Queensland. It was founded in 1957 and dissolved in 2014 with the headmasters of the Great Public Schools and Associated Independent Colleges expanding their respective competitions to include students from grades 5 to 12.

The CIC was originally known as the CCC (Combined Catholic Colleges) but was renamed after some Anglican schools were accepted into the association.

The association was primarily dedicated to the promotion and organisation of sport between the member colleges but other co-curricular activities such as chess and debating were also conducted.

== Member schools at dissolution ==
School	Location	Enrolment	Founded	Denomination	Day/Boarding	School Colors	Other associations
Anglican Church Grammar School	East Brisbane	1,700	1912	Anglican	Day & Boarding	Blue and grey	Great Public Schools Association of Queensland
Brisbane Boys' College	Toowong	1,600	1902	Presbyterian	Day & Boarding	Green, white and black	Great Public Schools Association of Queensland
Brisbane Grammar School	Spring Hill	1,400	1868	Non-Denominational	Day & Boarding	Dark blue and light blue	Great Public Schools Association of Queensland
Iona College	Wynnum West	1,300	1958	Catholic	Day	Black and white	Associated Independent Colleges
Marist College Ashgrove	Ashgrove	1,474	1940	Catholic	Day & Boarding	Blue and gold	Associated Independent Colleges
Moreton Bay Boys' College	Manly West	380	2003	Presbyterian	Day	Navy, sky blue & white	
Padua College	Kedron	1,200	1956	Catholic	Day	Brown, grey, white and gold	Associated Independent Colleges
St Joseph's College, Gregory Terrace	Spring Hill	1,240	1875	Catholic	Day	Red & black	Great Public Schools Association of Queensland
St. Joseph's, Nudgee Junior College	Indooroopilly	460	1938	Catholic	Day	Blue and white	
St Joseph's College, Nudgee	Boondall	1,470	1891	Catholic	Day & Boarding	Blue and white	Great Public Schools Association of Queensland
St Laurence's College	South Brisbane	1,375	1915	Catholic	Day	Black and gold	Associated Independent Colleges
St Patrick's College	Shorncliffe	960	1952	Catholic	Day	Green and gold	Associated Independent Colleges
The Southport School	Southport	1,200	1901	Anglican	Day & Boarding	Maroon, navy and white	Great Public Schools Association of Queensland
Villanova College	Coorparoo	1,150	1948	Catholic	Day	Green and gold	Associated Independent Colleges

Moreton Bay Boys' College entered the competition in 2009. Other schools that were previously members include: De La Salle College, St Columban's College, Marcellin College, St Paul's School, John Paul College, Ormiston College and Canterbury College.
