= St Edmund's College, Ipswich =

Catholic private school in Ipswich, Australia

St Edmund's College

Location
- Ipswich, Queensland; Australia; 27°36′34″S 152°45′13.4″E

Information
- Type: Independent all-boys secondary school
- Motto: Latin: Possunt Quia Posse Videntur ("They Can Because They See They Can")
- Religious affiliation: Catholicism
- Denomination: Congregation of Christian Brothers
- Established: 1892; 134 years ago
- Sister school: St Mary's College, Ipswich
- Oversight: Edmund Rice Education Australia
- Principal: Ray Celegato
- Years offered: 5-12
- Gender: Boys
- Enrollment: 1,230
- Campus type: Suburban
- Houses: Ambrose; Callan; Elliot; Finn; Ignatius; Morgan; Rice; Treacy
- Colours: Blue and white
- Mascot: Wayne the Wolf
- Affiliation: Associated Independent Colleges
- Website: www.sec.qld.edu.au

St Edmund's College (known colloquially as Eddies) is an independent Catholic secondary day school for boys, located in Woodend, Ipswich, Queensland, Australia. The school was founded by the Congregation of Christian Brothers in 1892 and is conducted in the tradition of Edmund Ignatius Rice.

The school is a member of the Associated Independent Colleges of the Greater Brisbane region along with Marist College Ashgrove, Iona College, Padua College, Villanova College, St Patrick's College, St Laurence's College and St. Peters Lutheran College.

As of 2025, St Edmunds College accepts students from Years 5 to 12, drawing from a wide area of Ipswich, Queensland.

== History ==
In 1891, the first foundation stone for the Brothers' residence was laid, and in February 1892 after a grand opening by the Archbishop Robert Dunne the Christian Brothers moved in.

The original St Edmunds Christian Brothers building was used until 1961, and is now used by St Mary's Primary School, still located on the corner of Mary & Elizabeth St, Woodend, besides the church. The former school buildings and walls are included among the significant components of the heritage-listed St Marys Roman Catholic Church Precinct.

On the 21st of February, 1965, the foundation stone for the new building was blessed by Reverend Sir James Duhig and laid by the then current mayor of Ipswich, Alderman J. T. Finimore. This was the time the name was of the College was changed from Christian Brothers' College to St Edmund's Christian Brothers' College.

In 1998, Br Ted Magee was the last Christian Brother principal to serve the college.

In 2006, Br Ambrose Purcell was the last Christian Brother to serve as a member of staff, moving back to Sudan to continue his mission work.

== Skool 2 Skoolies ==
The Skool 2 Skoolies initiative began in 2003, when one Year 12 St Edmund's student pledged to cycle 115 km (71 mi) to the Gold Coast on his last day of school. His primary mission was to raise funds for charity.

== Sport ==
St. Edmund's is a member of the Associated Independent Colleges (AIC).

- Season 1 February – March: Swimming, Cricket, Volleyball, AFL
- Season 2 April – June: Chess, Cross Country, Rugby Union, Soccer
- Season 3 July – October: Hockey, Cross Country, Track and Field, Basketball, Tennis, Rugby League
- Season 4 October – November: Track and Field, Golf

AIC sports include: Australian rules, basketball, chess, cricket, cross country, rugby union (St Edmund's College Ipswich was selected to represent Australia at the prestigious Sanix World Rugby Youth Invitational Tournament in Fukuoka, Japan during 2003), soccer, swimming, tennis, track & field, volleyball, hockey, and rugby league. Non-AIC sports include: e-sports, golf and hockey.

=== AIC premierships ===
St Edmund's College has won the following AIC premierships.

- Athletics (3) – 2012, 2013, 2014
- Basketball (5) – 2001, 2002, 2006, 2017, 2020
- Chess (2) - 2011, 2020
- Rugby (2) – 2011, 2014
- Soccer – 2016
- Tennis – 2005
- Volleyball (5) – 1999, 2003, 2005, 2008, 2011

== Musical and drama productions ==
Each year, since 2007, a full musical production is conducted, in conjunction with St. Mary's College, Ipswich. The host school alternates every year.

=== Musicals ===
- 2025 (SEC) – 'Joseph and the Amazing Technicolor Dreamcoat'
- 2024 (SMC) - 'Mary Poppins the Broadway Musical'
- 2023 (SEC) – 'The Addams Family'
- 2022 (SMC) – ‘High School Musical on Stage!’
- 2021 (SEC) – 'School of Rock'
- 2019 (SMC) – 'Matilda the musical'
- 2018 (SEC) – 'Rock of Ages 101: High School Edition'
- 2017 (SMC) – 'Hairspray'
- 2016 (SEC) – 'The Wiz'
- 2015 (SMC) – 'Legally Blonde: The Musical'
- 2014 (SEC) – 'West Side Story'
- 2013 (SMC) – 'The Bells of St Mary's'
- 2012 (SEC) – '13'
- 2011 (SMC) – 'Fame'
- 2010 (SEC) – 'Footloose'
- 2009 (SMC) – 'High School Musical'
- 2008 (SEC) – 'Grease'
- 2007 (SMC) – 'Thoroughly Modern Millie'
- 2006 (SEC) – 'Beach Blanket Tempest'
- 2005 (SMC) – 'Little Shop of Horrors'
- 2004 (SEC) – 'The Outsiders'
- 2003 (SMC) – 'Now and Then'
- 2002 (SEC) – 'Back to the 80s'
- 2001 (SMC) – 'Jesus Christ Superstar'
- 2000 (SEC) – 'Joseph and the Amazing Technicolor Dreamcoat'
- 1999 (SMC) – 'Open Season'
- 1998 (SEC) – 'SherWoodstock'
- 1997 (SMC) – 'Worlds Apart'
- 1996 (SEC) – 'Evita'
- 1995 (SMC) – 'Macbeth – The Rock Opera'
- 1994 (SEC) – 'Bye Bye Birdie'
- 1993 (SEC) – 'Half a Sixpence'
- 1992 (SEC) – 'The Pirates of Penzance'
- 1991 (SEC) – '¡Viva México! (El grito de Dolores)'
- 1990 (SEC) – 'Pippin'
- 1989 (SEC) – 'Oklahoma'

== Houses ==
In 1981, Eddies added school houses. These houses, Hogan, Ryles, Carroll and Stevens, were named after previous principals of the school.

Name	Colour	Name origin
Stevens	Red	J.C. Stevens, college principal from 1940–1941
Hogan	Gold	W.J. Hogan, college principal from 1899–1901 and 1905–1907
Ryall	Green	G.E. Ryall, college principal from 1952–1954
Carroll	Blue	M.C. Carroll, college principal from 1925–1930

In 1995, the four houses at St Edmund’s changed their names, which coincided with the college moving from year levels to a Pastoral System.

- Hogan became Rice (yellow)
- Ryall became Callan (green)
- Carroll became Morgan (blue)
- Stevens became Treacy (red)

In 2003, due to an increase in student numbers, these house were split in half, creating eight houses: Callan 1, Callan 2, Rice 1, Rice 2, Morgan 1, Morgan 2, Treacy 1 and Treacy 2.

At the end of 2006, further change came when these eight houses were folded into six for the following year, with the addition of two new houses, Finn and Ambrose.

In 2013, two more houses were created in preparation of Year 7 returning to St Edmund’s College in 2015. These two house were named Ignatius and Elliott.

Name	Colour	Crest	Motto	Name origin
Ambrose	Maroon		Courage to believe, strength to succeed	Br Desmond Ambrose Purcell (known as 'Br Ambrose') was a Christian Brother who served the community of Ipswich and was the last Christian Brother to teach at St Edmund's.
Callan	Green		Participation, determination, success	Callan, Ireland was the home town of Edmund Rice.
Elliott	Teal		Scottish Gaelic: In ár caisleáin togetherness a tógadh – In our togetherness castles are built	Elliott house is named after Mary Elliott the wife of Edmund Rice. She died suddenly a few years after they were married.
Finn	Orange		Fair & Just	Named after Patrick Finn, who was not only one of the founding members of the Christian Brothers but also one of Edmund Rice's closest companions.
Ignatius	Purple		To go where no one else will go	'Ignatius' was the name Edmund Rice took to mark his new life as a Christian Brother.
Morgan	Blue		In giving we receive	Morgan house derives its name from the first Christian Brother Principal – Brother J Morgan who came to Ipswich in February 1892 and took up residence to establish the school.
Rice	Gold		Latin: Nihil alienum – Nothing is alien to us	Named after the founder of the Christian Brothers, Edmund Ignatius Rice.
Treacy	Red		Latin: Prorria audax virtute – Bravery in the cause of virtue	Brother Patrick Ambrose Treacy (20 October 1834 – 15 August 1913) was the first Christian Brothers' provincial superior of Australia, who established the first permanent Christian Brothers community in Australia in 1868. The Treacy crest and motto was created by the first dean of the house, Mr Paul Begg.

== Principals ==
- Joseph Morgan: 1892–1894
- J.D. O'Donaghe: 1895–1898
- W.J. Hogan: 1899–1901, 1905–1907
- R.X. Butler: 1902–1904
- J.F. O'Brien: 1908–1914, 1931–1936, 1939
- F. Donovan: 1915–1918
- Thomas C. Seery: 1919
- B. O'Ryan: 1920–1924
- M.C. Carroll: 1925–1930
- S.L. Carroll: 1937–1938
- J.C. Stevens: 1940–1941
- H.A. Segrave: 1942
- R.G. McCartney: 1943–1945
- F.C. Walsh: 1946–1948
- N.G. Wigmore: 1949–1951
- G.E. Ryall: 1952–1954
- W.A. Lewis: 1955–1960
- Brian Malachy Shortill: 1961–1966
- K.F. Lynch: 1967–1971
- A.I. Schofield: 1972–1977
- L.E. "Ted" Magee: 1978–1983, 1994–1998
- R.M. Reardon: 1984–1989
- R.O. “Steve” Grundy: 1990–1992
- Jim Lucey: 1999–2004
- Brendan Lawler: 2005–2013
- Christopher Leadbetter: 2014–2017
- Diarmuid O'Riordan: 2018–2019
- Ray Celegato: 2020–present

== Notable alumni ==
Entertainment, media and the arts

- John Birmingham – author
- d'Arcy Doyle – artist
- Nathan Kneen – singer and former member of The Ten Tenors
- Rhys Lee – artist

Politics and the law

- Josiah Francis – politician
- Matthew Hickey OAM – barrister and founding member and producer of The Ten Tenors
- Jim Madden – solicitor and former Member for Ipswich West
- John Nugent – former Chairman of the Moreton Shire Council and former mayor of Ipswich
- Henry Palaszczuk – former Labor member of the Legislative Assembly of Queensland
- Paul Pisasale – former mayor of Ipswich

Sport

- Denis Flannery – rugby league player
- Harley Fox – rugby union player
- Peter Gallagher – rugby league player
- Doug McLean Jr. – rugby union and rugby league player
- Sam Johnson – rugby union player
- Noel Kelly – rugby league player
- Paul McLean MBE – rugby union player and official
- Peter McMahon OAM – swimmer and businessman
- Joe Ofahengaue – rugby league player
- Heath Ramsay – Olympic swimmer
- Grant Sorensen – Olympic volleyball player
- James Stannard – rugby union player

== See also ==
- List of schools in Queensland
- Catholic education in Australia
