= Villanova College (Australia) =

Catholic private school in Brisbane, Australia

Location
- Coorparoo, Queensland; Australia; 27°29′45″S 153°3′5″E

Information
- Type: Private, day school
- Motto: Vincit Veritas (Truth Conquers)
- Denomination: Roman Catholic, Augustinians
- Patron saint: St Thomas of Villanova
- Established: 1948
- Sister school: Loreto College, Coorparoo
- Principal: Paul Begg
- Staff: ~204 (Full & part-time) as of end of 2025
- Grades: 5–12
- Gender: Male
- Enrolment: ~1,500
- Hours in school day: From 8:25 am to 3:00 pm
- Houses: Augustine, Rita, Monica, Thomas, Adeodatus, Ambrose, Nicholas, Alypius
- Colours: Green and gold
- Affiliation: Associated Independent Colleges
- Website: www.vnc.qld.edu.au

Villanova College is an independent Roman Catholic school for boys located in Coorparoo, a southern suburb of Brisbane, Australia. It caters to approximately 1,500 boys in three schools – junior, middle, senior – across years five to twelve. It was established in 1948 by six Irish priests, led by Ben O'Donnell, who was from the Order of Saint Augustine in the suburb of Hamilton. In 1954, due to a lack of prospects for growth in Hamilton, the college moved to its present site at Coorparoo. The college is a member of the Association of Heads of Independent Schools of Australia (AHISA), The Independent Primary School Heads of Australia (IPSHA) and the Associated Independent Colleges (AIC). Villanova College is an Augustinian school.

== History ==
The establishment of Villanova College followed an invitation from Archbishop of Brisbane James Duhig to the Irish Province of the Order of St Augustine to establish a boys' school in Brisbane. The College was founded in 1948 by a group of Irish Augustinians led by Father Ben O'Donnell, opening at Whinstanes in Hamilton with an initial enrolment of 40 students.

Duhig's support for the establishment of the College formed part of his wider efforts to expand Catholic educational and religious institutions in Queensland. During his episcopate, he introduced numerous religious orders into the state, including teaching communities, to support the development of Catholic schools and other institutions.

The College was established with an emphasis on a classical and liberal education, reflecting the educational tradition of the Augustinian Order. Its educational philosophy drew on the Augustinian principles of community, mutual respect, learning and the pursuit of truth.

=== Whinstanes (1948–1953) ===
Whinstanes House (after which the suburb was named) was built by prominent society figure Alexander Brand Webster. After his death, the house and the remaining 9 acres of land were sold 1925 to Our Lady of the Sacred Heart who established College Whinstanes, which opened as a junior boys boarding school. The school’s motto “Vincit Veritas” is the Webster motto was borrowed from a stained glass window in Whinstanes House with the Webster crest .

In 1948, archbishop James Duhig welcomed Ben O'Donnell with five other Irish Augustinians to Australia, and invited them to start a school in Brisbane. They subsequently established Villanova in the suburb of Whinstanes (now part of Hamilton). On 25 January 1948, the college was officially opened by the chancellor of the University of Queensland, William Forgan Smith, who raised the college flag in front of the main entrance and was blessed by Duhig. In 1953 a decision was made to move the college due to lack of prospects for expansion in Whinstanes.

Villanova College in its infancy at Coorparoo in 1954.

The Langlands Building was built in 1884.

=== Coorparoo (1954–present) ===
Early in the 1880s, merchant Reuben Nicklin built a large house Langlands in Coorparoo. In 1886, Nicklin built another house Hatherton (now Queen Alexandra Home) at another site in Coorparoo and sold the Langlands house and its grounds. (Nicklin and his wife died in the wreck of the RMS Quetta in 1890). Thomas Connah and William Brookes bought a large block of land that included Nicklin's house. Connah resided in Nicklin's former residence. Connah became Queensland auditor-general and he sold Langlands to archbishop James Duhig in 1916. Langlands became the Good Samaritan Convent of Saint Scholastica until 1953, when Villanova College moved from Whinstanes to the Coorparoo property.

Early Students

The school was officially opened on 22 November 1953 by Duhig. The building had been built for £50,000 and could accommodate 500 students. In the 1960s/70s, a library, science laboratories, senior classrooms and a new primary block joined the existing buildings on the campus. During this period, the college saw additional co-curricular facilities including a swimming pool on campus and sporting fields at Tingalpa. During the 1970s/80s the college saw the foundation of the student council as well as the leadership role of all the boys in the senior class which led to the abolition of the prefect system. The election of captains and vice-captains of the school and houses by the senior class was started. The Goold gymnasium and assembly hall were built as well as more classrooms, new science laboratories, a technical drawing room, and some art rooms.

The Queensland Catholic Schools and Colleges Music Festival (QCMF) was established by Villanova College in 1991. The annual festival grew from 43 performances involving 12 local Catholic schools to an event involving more than 15,000 student musicians from more than 100 schools. It became a major event in the Queensland Catholic education calendar and continues to be hosted at Villanova College.

The late eighties and nineties saw the governance of the college now entrusted to a college council composed of staff, parents, Augustinians, past students, and friends of the college. It also saw new courses start in computing, and catering start at the college and the introduction of a campus-wide computer network as well as computers in classrooms. The 1990s saw the college split from the TAS competition and the foundation of the AIC Competition. The O'Donnell Building opened in 1994, providing additional classrooms and art facilities. It was named after the College's first rector, Fr Ben O'Donnell OSA.

Villanova Park, the College's sporting grounds on Manly Road in Tingalpa, continued to be expanded is an important extension of the Coorparoo campus. The grounds now contain seven playing fields and are used for the College's sporting programs and community activities.

In 2006 the college inaugurated its three present schools:

- junior school, for years 5 and 6
- middle school, for years 7 through 9
- senior school, for years 10 through 12

Mascots at Junior School Spirit Rally

In late 2020, the Saint Thomas of Villanova Learning Centre was released, with views of the Brisbane skyline and having been designed for twenty-first-century learning. It adds six classrooms to the senior precinct of the college along with an auditorium, facilities for the head of senior school and pastoral leaders, a common area, and spacious breakout areas for individual and group learning. Levels one and two of the St Thomas of Villanova Learning Centre constitute the new junior school of the college. Twelve open-area classrooms with wide and varied breakout areas allow for cooperative teaching and learning.

Pope Leo XIV Precinct Groundbreaking Ceremony with College Chaplain Fr Saldie Resolado and College Principal.

The College's modern history has also included several significant incidents. On 27 December 2016, an approximately eight-metre-high section of brick wall at the Senior School's Veritas building collapsed during the Christmas holidays. No students were injured. In September 2017, the Cor Unum Centre at Villanova Park was destroyed by fire. The facility was subsequently replaced by a new grandstand.

The College's history was also affected by criminal proceedings involving former Augustinian priest and teacher Michael Ambrose Endicott, who worked at Villanova College during the 1970s. In 2010, Endicott pleaded guilty to two counts of indecent treatment of a child relating to incidents in 1977 and 1978 and received a suspended sentence. In 2019, he was convicted of three further historical offences relating to a former Villanova student, but the convictions were subsequently quashed by the Queensland Court of Appeal. Following the 2019 proceedings, the Order of St Augustine issued an apology concerning the abuse of students and stated that it would respond to the recommendations of the Royal Commission into Institutional Responses to Child Sexual Abuse.

In October 2026, construction was completed on the college's new Pope Leo XIV Precinct, one of the largest capital projects in Villanova College's history. The precinct includes the Prevost Centre, featuring eight STEM laboratories and collaborative learning spaces, and the Cor Unum Hall, a multipurpose facility with two basketball courts and seating for more than 2,100 people. The precinct also includes a strength and performance gym, change rooms, outdoor study areas and other community facilities.

The precinct was named in honour of Pope Leo XIV, reflecting Villanova College's Augustinian heritage. The Prevost Centre commemorates his early career as a teacher of physics and mathematics. The college took possession of the precinct in early October 2026, with teaching in the new STEM facilities commencing in 2027.

== House system ==
For most of the college's history, the house system comprised four houses, each named after Augustinian bishops. These were:

- Goold (yellow) – named after James Alipius Goold, the first Augustinian bishop in Australia
- Crane (red) – named after Martin Crane, an early Augustinian bishop
- Murray (blue) – named after James Dominic Murray, Bishop of Cooktown
- Heavey (green) – named after John Heavey, an Augustinian bishop.

In 2024, the college shifted to a different house system that more effectively aligned with their values of intra-house brotherhood and mentorship. Eight houses were created, that compete in inter-house athletics, cross-country, and swimming, as well as many other school-based activities. The houses are named after notable Augustinians, particularly those related to St Augustine.

House Mascots; (Left to Right) Thomas, Ambrose, Monica, Rita, Alypius, Augustine, Nicholas, Adeodatus.

| Name | Color | Animal |
|---|---|---|
| Alypius | Black | Horse |
| Ambrose | Green | Owl |
| Augustine | Purple | Hippo |
| Adeodatus | Teal | Phoenix |
| Nicholas | Blue | Wolf |
| Monica | Yellow | Lion |
| Rita | Red | Bee |
| Thomas | Pink | Pelican |

== Rectors and Principals ==
There have been 8 Augustinian rectors at Villanova College in its history. The traditional job of the rector was to lead the college but this changed after the retirement of Michael Morahan in 2009. Now Villanova College has a lay principal with the priests living in the priory. The current chaplain of the college is Saldie Resolado, after Peter Weineke's retirement at the end of 2024.

| Rector | Years | Notes |
|---|---|---|
| Ben O'Donnell | 1948–1958 | Founding member and first rector of the college |
| Louis Hanrahan | 1959–1964 | |
| Kevin Burman | 1965–1970 | |
| Donal Paul Dempsey | 1971–1975 | |
| Laurence Mooney | 1976–1986 | |
| Peter Weineke | 1987–1994 | |
| Michael Morahan | 1995–2009 | Last Augustinian rector of the college |
| Dennis Harvey | 2010–2014 | |
| Mark Stower | 2015–2021 | |
| Paul Begg | 2022–Current | |

== Co-curriculum ==
Old Boys Round Jersey being worn in 2026.

=== Sport ===
The college is a foundation member of the Associated Independent Colleges (AIC). The college has sporting fields at Tingalpa, in Brisbane's east suburbs. The AIC Sporting Association is for all years from five to open. It comprises 8 schools, Marist College Ashgrove, St Edmunds College, Ipswich, St Patrick's College, Iona College, Padua College, St Laurence's College and St. Peters Lutheran College. The sports played by the association are rugby union, soccer, Australian Football League, cricket, basketball, volleyball, tennis, swimming, chess, Water Polo, athletics and cross country.

Villanova Rugby

==== AIC premierships ====
Villanova College has won the following AIC premierships.

- Basketball (9) – 2002, 2004, 2009, 2012, 2013, 2019, 2021, 2022, 2023, 2024
- Cricket (6) – 2001, 2002, 2012, 2013, 2019, 2021
- Rugby – (1) 2010
- Soccer (5) – 2005, 2007, 2012, 2013, 2022
- Tennis (5) – 2000, 2002, 2004, 2005, 2012
- Volleyball (5) – 2000, 2001, 2002, 2012, 2022
- AFL (3) – 2004, 2022, 2026
- Rugby League (1) – 2023
- Chess (3) – 2008, 2017, 2019
  Villanova College Orchestra.

Villanova College Drumline

=== Music ===
The college currently has over 30 main music ensembles including:

- Symphony orchestras
- String orchestras
- Concert bands
- Vocal ensembles
- Guitar ensembles
- Percussion ensembles
- Sport/Spirit Drumlines
- Jazz ensembles
- Commercial (contemporary) ensembles
- Irish ensembles
- Chamber string, woodwind, and brass ensembles

The college hosts Queensland's largest music festival for Catholic schools and colleges, Queensland Catholic Schools & College's Music Festival (QCMF). Villanova is home to a music center, known as the Augustine Centre. Within this center is the Hanrahan Theatre, named after the second rector of the college, Fr John Hanrahan. , thanks to support from staff, students, parents, and the local and greater Brisbane communities. Considered an inclusive art, there is a place for all students in the music program, so long as they have the necessary desire and commitment to create music at the highest possible standard.

Mary Poppins Musical with Loreto College 2020.

=== Cultural and spiritual ===
Villanova runs musical productions in conjunction with Loreto College Coorparoo every two years. Recent productions have been Footloose (2018), Mary Poppins (2020), High School Musical (2022), Legally Blonde (2024), and most recently, Beauty and the Beast (2026). Students of Chinese language studies have the opportunity to visit China every second year. The music department holds a music tour for all students in the college's senior ensembles every two years, the most recent tours being to the United States in 2013, Tasmania in 2015, New Zealand in 2017 as part of the Rhapsody Rotorua Music Festival, Sydney in 2019 with the Senior Percussion Ensemble and Villanova Conkestra, where students performed at world-class venues including the Sydney Opera House.

The Villanova College - St. Augustine's College tour is an annual inter-school sporting and cultural exchange. Since its establishment 77 years ago, the tour has stood as a long-standing tradition connecting the two schools in culture and spirit, strengthening their relationship as brother schools. The tour operates on a reciprocal basis, with schools alternating as hosts each year. Coaches and their students travel interstate to compete in a program involving debating, basketball, football, rugby and, recently, chess and music.

== Villanova Old Boys' Association ==
Villanova Old Boys Logo.

The Villanova Old Boys' Association (VOBA) represents former students and seeks to maintain connections between Old Boys, their families and the wider college community. The association organises reunions, sporting and social events and provides opportunities for former students to remain involved with the College. It also supports the College through fundraising and initiatives benefiting current and future students.

Among its philanthropic activities is the Terry Hendle Bursary, established by the Class of 1964 and the Villanova Old Boys Association in memory of former student Terry Hendle, who died while serving in the Vietnam War. The bursary provides financial assistance to students who might otherwise be unable to access a Villanova education and is funded through donations and fundraising.

=== Life Members ===
Life Membership is granted for long-standing, dedicated service and commitment to the Old Boys' Association and the wider Villanova community. There have been 9 Old Boys and 4 honorary Old Boys inducted as Life Members.

- Tony Chadwick
- Keith McCoola
- Peter Geraghty
- Peter Ferguson
- John Walsh
- Simon Healy
- Errol Davis
- John Perrier
- Bub Morley
- Fr Pete Wieneke OSA
- Charlie Fisher (Hon.)
- Keith Druery (Hon.)
- Kath Underhill (Hon.)
- Steve Bremner (Hon.)

== Notable alumni ==
=== Arts ===
- James Moloney – author, best known for The Book of Lies, The Gracey Trilogy, and A Bridge to Wiseman's Cove.

=== Politics ===
- George Brandis – King's Counsel, Senator, Leader of the Government in the Senate, Attorney-General of Australia, High Commissioner to the United Kingdom
- David Byrne – former member of the Legislative Assembly of Queensland and co-founder of the Cape York Land Council.
- Paul Lucas – former Queensland Parliamentarian and former Deputy Premier of Queensland
- Gordon Nuttall – former State of Queensland Government (Labor) Minister
- Drew Pavlou – Student Activist at the University of Queensland
- Kerry Shine – (Australian Labor Party) Former Queensland Attorney General and Minister for Justice; State Member for Toowoomba North
- Ross Vasta – Federal Liberal Member for Bonner

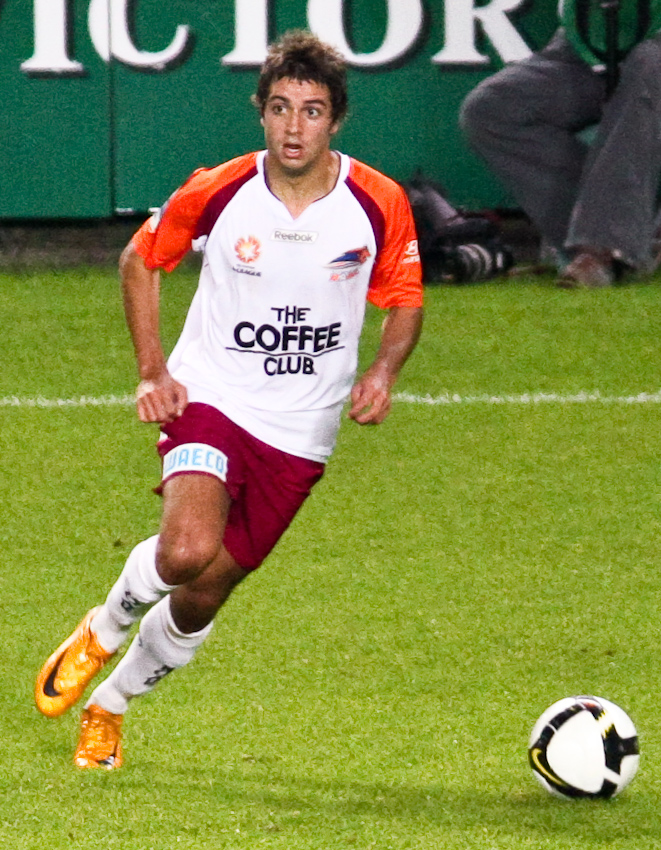
Michael Zullo, Former Australian Socceroos Player

=== Sports ===
- Brad Meyers – Rugby League player for the Brisbane Broncos (1998–2004), Bradford Bulls (2005–2007) and Gold Coast Titans (2008–2011)
- Ben Mowen – former Wallaby captain and former captain of the ACT Brumbies
- Will Sankey – currently playing Rugby Union for the Western Force in the Super Rugby. Making His Debut against the Melbourne Rebels on 8 April 2022
- Chris Simpson – former captain of the Queensland Bulls cricket team
- Andrew Slack – former Wallaby 39 caps (Captain 1984–1987) and Reds player (133 games for Queensland), head of Sports for Channel 9 News Brisbane
- Bruce Walker – Former Australian and Queensland Rugby League representative.
- Christian Welch – currently playing Rugby League for the Melbourne Storm. Also played Rugby League for the Queensland Maroons
- Michael Zullo – former member of FC Utrecht. Has also played for the Australia national football team on 2 occasions.

=== Media and entertainment ===
- Dan Feuerriegel – actor, appeared in Spartacus: Blood and Sand, Home and Away, and McLeod's Daughters
- Chris Reason – journalist and Co-Host of Channel Seven's Sunday Sunrise

Old Boys Who Became Supreme Court Justices of the Supreme Court of Queensland – James Douglas, Martin Burns and Peter Lyons.

=== Law ===
- James S Douglas – Judge of the Supreme Court of Queensland, holder of degrees from The University of Queensland and Cambridge University
- Peter Lyons – former Judge of the Supreme Court of Queensland and former president of the Bar Association of Queensland

== Awards ==
In 2026, Villanova College was named among The Educator's 5-Star Best Schools 2026.

== Associated schools ==
Villanova's brother school is St. Augustine's College, Brookvale in Sydney. Loreto College is the sister school of Villanova College.

== See also ==
- Education in Australia
- List of schools in Greater Brisbane
- List of schools in Queensland

== Sources ==
- Arneil, Stan; Out Where the Dead Men Lie (The Augustinians in Australia 1838–1992), Augustinian Press Brookvale (1992); ISBN 0-949826-03-0
