= Associated Independent Colleges =

Group of secondary schools in Queensland, Australia

- Formation: 1998
- Headquarters: Brisbane, Queensland
- Members: Iona College, Brisbane; Marist College Ashgrove; Padua College, Brisbane; St Edmund's College, Ipswich; St Laurence's College; St Patrick's College, Shorncliffe; St Peters Lutheran College; Villanova College
- Official language: English
- Website: http://aicsport.com.au/

The Associated Independent Colleges, or AIC, is a group of independent secondary schools in south-east Queensland, Australia. With the exception of St Peters Lutheran College, AIC schools are all-boys schools (St Peter's secondary girls compete in the Queensland Girls' Secondary Schools Sports Association).

The AIC was founded in 1998 as an athletic association for male secondary students. All eight colleges were formerly members of The Associated Schools (TAS), founded in 1956. Some colleges were originally members of the Metropolitan Catholic Schools Association (MCSA), founded in 1934. The most prominent sports contested include rugby union, cricket and football, as well as swimming and track and field.

== History ==
The Associated Independent Colleges was formed in 1998 with the first year of competition being 1999. All AIC members were previously in The Associated Schools (TAS). The TAS had expanded to include fifteen schools by the mid 1990s and the standard of competition was falling. The colleges with the strongest athletic programs in the TAS competition's top division moved to form the AIC.

After the AIC was founded, only one all-boys school remained in TAS, the now defunct Marist Brothers College Rosalie. In protest of the departure of the eight AIC schools from TAS competition, all TAS schools with a primary school attached withdrew from the Combined Independent Colleges (CIC) association for private primary schools in 1998. Six of the Associated Independent Colleges were foundation members of the CIC.

The Combined Independent Colleges association was dissolved in 2013. Primary schools attached to AIC schools had previously competed against their Great Public Schools (GPS) counterparts within the CIC, but the headmasters of the GPS and AIC associations expanded their respective competitions in 2014 to include primary students from grades 5–7.

== Schools ==
Member school	Location	Enrolment	Year founded	Denomination	Day or boarding	Entered competition	School colours
Iona College	Lindum	1617	1958	Catholic	Day	1998	Black and white
Marist College Ashgrove	Ashgrove	1635	1940	Catholic	Day & Boarding	1998	Blue and gold
Padua College	Kedron	1462	1956	Catholic	Day	1998	Brown, grey, white and gold
St Edmund's College	Ipswich	1026	1892	Catholic	Day	1998	Blue & white
St Laurence's College	South Brisbane	1905	1915	Catholic	Day	1998	Black and gold
St Patrick's College	Shorncliffe	1332	1952	Catholic	Day	1998	Green and gold
St Peters Lutheran College	Indooroopilly	2043	1945	Lutheran	Day & Boarding	1998	Maroon and white
Villanova College	Coorparoo	1269	1948	Catholic	Day	1998	Green and gold

Starting in 2022, Ambrose Treacy College, Indooroopilly was invited to become a guest member for a two-year time span.

== Sports ==
There are currently ten sports officially contested within the AIC:

- Athletics (track and field)
- Basketball
- Cricket
- Chess
- Cross country running
- Football (soccer)
- Rugby union
- Swimming
- Tennis
- Volleyball

Four other sports are also offered:

- Australian rules football
- Golf
- Rugby league
- Water polo

Water polo is played as a social competition in Term 4. An invitational golf day is also held in Term 4, with the annual Gordon Balharry Shield awarded to the AIC school with the best team score on an adjusted handicap basis. Rugby league and Australian rules football competitions were introduced on a two-year opt-in trial basis for 2019.

Ashgrove, Iona and St Laurence's have traditionally been prominent in the rugby competitions, although Padua has enjoyed recent success. St Peters, Villanova and Padua have tended to field strong soccer teams. St Patrick's has had success in cross country and Ashgrove and Iona have won the most titles in athletics and swimming.

The sporting calendar for the AIC is split into terms:

- 1st: Australian football • Cricket • Volleyball • Swimming
- 2nd: Chess • Football • Rugby union
- 3rd: Basketball • Cross country • Rugby league • Tennis
- 4th: Athletics • Golf • Water polo

The championships for swimming, cross country, track and field athletics and golf are held on a single day. The other sports are played in a round-robin format (no finals) with each school playing all others once. Premierships in each grade, for age divisions from under 13 to open, (Note: The open division excludes players that turn 19 years of age or older in the year of competition.) are won by the teams with most points over the season. The premierships for the schools' first teams in each sport, particularly the First XV rugby, tend to attract the most interest.

== Championships ==
=== Athletics (track and field) ===
Winning teams on aggregate points for all age groups:

Year	Winner
1999	Ashgrove
2000	Iona
2001	Iona
2002	Iona
2003	Ashgrove
2004	Ashgrove
2005	Ashgrove
2006	Iona
2007	Iona
2008	Iona
2009	Iona
2010	Iona
2011	Iona
2012	St Edmund's
2013	St Edmund's
2014	St Edmund's
2015	Ashgrove
2016	Ashgrove
2017	Ashgrove
2018	Ashgrove
2019	Ashgrove
2020	Ashgrove
2021	Ashgrove
2022	Ashgrove
2023	Ashgrove
2024	Ashgrove
2025	Ashgrove

Championships – Ashgrove (15), Iona (9), St Edmund's (3).

=== Cross Country ===
Winning teams on aggregate points for all age groups:

Year	Winner
1999	Iona
2000	Iona
2001	Iona
2002	Ashgrove
2003	St Laurence's
2004	St Laurence's
2005	Ashgrove
2006	Iona
2007	Iona
2008	Ashgrove
2009	Ashgrove
2010	St Patrick's
2011†	Iona • St Patrick's
2012†	Ashgrove • St Patrick's
2013	St Patrick's
2014†	Ashgrove • St Patrick's
2015	Iona
2016	Iona
2017	Ashgrove
2018	Ashgrove
2019	Ashgrove
2020	Ashgrove
2021	Ashgrove
2022	Ashgrove
2023	Iona
2024	Ashgrove
2025	Ashgrove
2026	Ashgrove
† indicates shared championship

Championships – Ashgrove (15), Iona (9), St Patrick's (5), St Laurence's (2).

=== Swimming ===
Winning teams on aggregate points for all age groups:

Year	Winner
1999	St Peter's
2000	St Peter's
2001	Ashgrove
2002	Ashgrove
2003†	Ashgrove • Iona
2004	Iona
2005	Ashgrove
2006	Ashgrove
2007	Ashgrove
2008	Ashgrove
2009	Ashgrove
2010	Ashgrove
2011	Ashgrove
2012	St Peter's
2013	Ashgrove
2014	St Peter's
2015	Ashgrove
2016	Ashgrove
2017	St Peter's
2018	St Peter's
2019	St Peter's
2020	St Peter's
2021	St Peter's
2022	St Peter's
2023	St Peter's
2024	St Peter's
2025	St Peter's
2026	St Peter's
† indicates shared championship

Championships – Ashgrove (13), St Peters (13), Iona (2).

== Premierships ==
=== First XV Rugby ===
List of First XV premiers and runners-up:

Year	Premiers	Runners-up
1999	Ashgrove*	Padua
2000†	Iona • St Peter's	St Laurence's
2001†	Ashgrove • St Laurence's	Iona
2002	Ashgrove*	Villanova
2003	Ashgrove*	St Laurence's
2004	Ashgrove*	St Laurence's
2005	Ashgrove*	St Laurence's
2006	Ashgrove*	St Patrick's
2007	Ashgrove*	St Laurence's
2008	St Laurence's*	Ashgrove
2009†	Ashgrove • Iona	St Laurence's • Villanova
2010	Villanova*	Ashgrove • St Laurence's
2011†	Ashgrove • Padua • St Edmund's	Iona
2012	St Peter's*	Ashgrove
2013	Iona*	St Edmund's • St Peter's
2014	St Edmund's*	Ashgrove • Padua
2015	Padua*	Ashgrove
2016	Padua*	St Patrick's
2017	Ashgrove*	St Patrick's
2018†	Ashgrove • Iona • St Patrick's	Villanova
2019	Ashgrove*	Padua • St Laurence's • Villanova
2020†	Ashgrove* • St Laurence's* (Note: Due to impacts of the COVID-19 pandemic, the 2020 season was cut short. Under the revised competition format, the title was shared by the top school in each pool.)	Padua • St Patrick's
2021	St Laurence's*	Ashgrove
2022	St Laurence's*	St Edmund's
2023	St Laurence’s*	Padua
2024	Padua*	Ashgrove
2025	Padua*	Ashgrove
2026	Ashgrove*	Villanova
Legend	* indicates undefeated season † indicates shared premiership for the year	

Premierships – Ashgrove (15), St Laurence's (6), Padua (5), Iona (4), St Peters (2), St Edmund's (2), St Patrick's (1), Villanova (1).

=== First XI Cricket ===
List of First XI premiers and runners-up:

Year	Premiers	Runners-up
1999	Iona	Ashgrove
2000	Iona	Villanova
2001	Villanova	St Laurence's
2002	Villanova	St Laurence's
2003	Ashgrove	St Laurence's
2004	Iona	St Laurence's
2005	Ashgrove	Padua
2006	Iona	Padua
2007	Iona	St Laurence's
2008	St Laurence's*	Iona
2009	Ashgrove	Padua
2010	Ashgrove	St Laurence's • Villanova
2011	Ashgrove	St Patrick's
2012†	Ashgrove • Iona • Padua • Villanova	St Peter's
2013	Villanova	Ashgrove
2014	Ashgrove*	Villanova
2015	Ashgrove	St Patrick's • Villanova
2016	Iona	St Laurence's
2017	St Laurence's*	Ashgrove
2018†	Ashgrove • St Patrick's	Villanova
2019	Villanova*	Ashgrove
2020	St Patrick's*	Villanova
2021	Villanova	Ashgrove • St Patrick's
2022	Iona	Ashgrove • St Patrick's
2023	Ashgrove	St Patrick's • St Peter's • Villanova
2024	Iona	St Peter's
2025	Ashgrove	Villanova
2026	Ashgrove*	Villanova
Legend	* indicates undefeated season † indicates shared premiership for the year	

Premierships – Ashgrove (11), Iona (9), Villanova (6), St Laurence's (2), St Patrick's (2), Padua (1).

=== First XI Football ===
List of First XI premiers and runners-up:

Year	Premiers	Runners-up
1999	Padua	St Laurence's
2000	Ashgrove	Padua
2001	Padua	St Laurence's
2002	St Laurence's	Ashgrove
2003	Ashgrove	Padua
2004	Ashgrove	St Laurence's
2005	Villanova	Iona
2006	St Laurence's*	Ashgrove
2007	Villanova	St Laurence's
2008	Ashgrove	Padua
2009	Ashgrove	St Laurence's
2010	Ashgrove	Padua
2011	Ashgrove	Villanova
2012	Villanova*	St Laurence's
2013†	Villanova • St Patrick's	Padua
2014	St Peter's*	
2015†	Iona • St Patrick's	St Laurence's
2016	St Edmund's	St Patrick's
2017	Iona*	St Patrick's
2018	Iona	St Patrick's
2019	Ashgrove	St Laurence's
2020†	Ashgrove • St Patrick's	St Peter's • Villanova
2021	Ashgrove	St Laurence's • Villanova
2022†	St Laurence's • Villanova	Iona • St Peter’s
2023	Iona	St Laurence's
2024	Ashgrove	St Patrick's
2025	Ashgrove	St Patrick's
2026	Ashgrove	St Laurence's
Legend	* indicates undefeated season † indicates shared premiership for the year	

Premierships – Ashgrove (13), Villanova (5), Iona (4), St Patrick's (3), St Laurence's (3), Padua (2), St Edmund's (1), St Peters (1).

=== First VI Volleyball ===
List of First VI premiers and runners-up:

Year	Premiers	Runners-up
1999	St Edmund's	
2000	Villanova	
2001	Padua	
2002	Villanova	
2003	St Edmund's	Ashgrove • Padua
2004	Ashgrove	
2005	St Edmund's	Ashgrove
2006	Padua	Ashgrove
2007	Ashgrove	
2008	St Edmund's	
2009	Ashgrove	St Patrick's
2010	Ashgrove	St Edmund's
2011	St Edmund's	Ashgrove
2012†	St Laurence's • St Peter's • Villanova	
2013	St Peter's	
2014†	St Laurence's • St Peter's	
2015	St Patrick's*	St Laurence's
2016	Padua*	St Laurence's
2017	Ashgrove*	
2018	Iona*	St Laurence's
2019	Iona*	Ashgrove
2020	St Laurence's	Padua
2021	Ashgrove*	St Laurence's • Villanova
2022	Villanova*	St Peters
2023	St Peter's*	Iona
2024	Iona*	Villanova • St Peter's
2025	Iona*	St Laurence's • St Edmund's
2026	Iona*	St Laurences
Legend	* indicates undefeated season † indicates shared premiership for the year	

Premierships – Ashgrove (6), St Edmund's (5), Iona (5), Villanova (4), St Peters (3), Padua (3), St Laurence's (3), St Patrick's (1).

=== First V Basketball ===
List of First V premiers:

Year	Premiers	Runners-up
1999	Ashgrove	
2000	Ashgrove	
2001	St Edmund's	
2002†	Ashgrove • Villanova	
2003	Ashgrove	
2004†	Ashgrove • Villanova	
2005†	Ashgrove • Iona	Padua
2006†	Ashgrove • St Edmund's	
2007†	Iona • St Peter's	Ashgrove
2008	Iona	Padua
2009†	Iona • Padua • Villanova	St Laurence's
2010	Padua	St Laurence's
2011	St Laurence's	Padua • Villanova
2012	Villanova	St Patrick's
2013	Villanova	Ashgrove
2014	Padua*	St Patrick's
2015	St Patrick's*	St Peter's
2016	Ashgrove*	St Patrick's
2017†	Ashgrove • St Edmund's	St. Laurence's
2018	Ashgrove	St Edmund's
2019	Villanova*	St Edmund's
2020	St Edmund's*	Villanova
2021	Villanova*	Padua
2022	Villanova*	St Peter's
2023	Villanova*	St Peter's
2024	Villanova*	St Patrick's
2025	Villanova*	St Edmund's
Legend	* indicates undefeated season † indicates shared premiership for the year	

Premierships – Villanova (11), Ashgrove (10), Iona (4), St Edmund's (4), Padua (3), St Laurence's (1), St Patrick's (1), St Peters (1).

=== First IV Tennis ===
List of First IV premiers:

Year	Premiers	Runners-up
1999	St Peter's	
2000	Villanova	
2001	Padua	Ashgrove
2002	Villanova	
2003	Ashgrove	Padua
2004	Villanova	
2005†	St Edmund's • Villanova	
2006	St Patrick's	Ashgrove
2007	Ashgrove	
2008	Ashgrove	
2009	Ashgrove	St Peter's
2010	Ashgrove	St Laurence's
2011	Ashgrove	Padua
2012	Villanova	Ashgrove
2013	St Peter's	Villanova
2014	St Peter's	
2015	St Peter's	Villanova
2016	St Peter's	
2017	St Peter's*	Iona
2018	St Peter's*	Padua
2019	St Peter's*	Padua
2020†	St Peter's* • St Laurence's*	Padua • Iona
2021	Iona	
2022	Iona*	Ashgrove
2023	St Peter’s*	St Laurence’s
2024	St Peter’s*	Ashgrove
Legend	* indicates undefeated season † indicates shared premiership for the year	

Premierships - St Peters (11), Ashgrove (6), Villanova (5), Iona (2), Padua (1), St Edmund's (1), St Patrick's (1), St Laurence's (1)

=== First IV Chess ===
The AIC chess competition began in 2004. List of First IV premiers:

Year	Premiers	Runners-up
2004	Iona	
2005	St Laurence's	
2006	St Laurence's	
2007	Padua	St Laurence's
2008†	Padua • Villanova	
2009	St Laurence's	
2010	Ashgrove	
2011	St Edmund's	
2012	Ashgrove	
2013	Ashgrove	
2014	Ashgrove	Padua
2015†	Padua • St Laurence's	Ashgrove
2016	Padua	St Laurence's
2017	Villanova	Padua
2018	Padua	St Peter's
2019†	St Peter's • Villanova	St Patrick's
2020†	St Peter's • St Edmund's	Ashgrove • St Patrick's
2021	St Laurence's	St Peter's
2022	St Peter's	St Laurence's
2023	St Laurence's*	Ashgrove
Legend	* indicates undefeated season † indicates shared premiership for the year	

Premierships – St Laurence's (6), Padua (5), Ashgrove (4), Villanova (3), St Peters (3), St Edmund's (2), Iona (1).

=== First XVIII Australian football ===
The AIC competition was introduced in 2019. List of First XVIII premiers:

Year	Premiers	Runners-up
2019	St Laurence's	St Patrick's
2020†	St Laurence's • St Patrick's (Note: The 2020 competition was cancelled due to the COVID-19 pandemic with one round remaining. The title was shared by the top two schools even though separated in the standings.)	Ashgrove
2021	St Laurence's	Villanova
2022	Villanova	Padua
2023	Ashgrove • St Laurence's	Padua • Villanova
2024	Ashgrove	Villanova
2025	Iona • St Laurence's	Padua
2026	Padua • St Laurence's • Villanova	Iona
Legend	† indicates shared premiership for the year	

Premierships - St Laurence's (6), Ashgrove (2), Padua (1), Villanova (1), St Patrick's (1)

=== First XIII Rugby league ===
The AIC competition was introduced in 2019. List of First XIII premiers:

Year	Premiers	Runners-up
2019	Ashgrove	Iona
2020	No competition	
2021†	Padua • St Patrick's	Iona
2022	Iona	Padua
2023†	Padua • Villanova	Ashgrove • Iona • St Laurence's
2024	Iona	Ashgrove
Legend	† indicates shared premiership for the year	

Premierships – Iona (2), Padua (2), Ashgrove (1), Villanova (1), St Patrick's (1).

== Other sports ==
=== Golf ===
Teams of up to five compete for the Gordon Balharry Shield. List of Open team winners since 2011:

Year	Winners	Runners-up	Ref
2011	Iona		
2012	Iona	Villanova	
2013	Iona		
2014	St Patrick's	Iona	
2015	Ashgrove		
2016	Villanova		
2017	Villanova		
2018	Ashgrove	St. Edmund's	
2019	St. Peters	St. Laurence's	
2020	Iona	Villanova	
2021	Iona	Villanova	

=== Water polo ===
Water polo is played as a social competition on an opt-in basis by AIC schools.

=== Touch Football ===
Touch Football is played as a social competition once a year between AIC schools, with teams competing in senior (10-12), middle (7-9) and primary (5-6) teams.

== Other events ==
Aside from athletic competitions, the AIC has formed a community with many other interactions. Member schools participate in the QDU debating competition, various mission and social justice events, the Queensland Catholic Colleges Music Festival (QCMF) and other social functions.

As all AIC schools are of Christian denomination, an Ecumenical service is hosted each year by one of the schools on a rotational basis. It is attended by staff and student leaders representing each school.

== See also ==
- List of schools in Queensland
