= List of alumni of St Joseph's College, Gregory Terrace =

There are many notable alumni of St Joseph's College, Gregory Terrace, Brisbane, Queensland, Australia.

== Rhodes Scholars ==
- James C. Mahoney (1929)
- Henry Finucan (1937)
- Colin Apelt (1954)
- Cedric Hampson (1955)
- James J. Mahoney (1963)
- John Corbett (1965)
- Hayden Mitchell (1969)
- Patrick Carroll (1974)
- Michael Wilson (1976)
- Peter Donnelly (1980)
- Bryan Horrigan (1986)
- John Devereaux (1988)
- Liam Kelly (1989)
- Andrew Rosengren (1991)
- Robert Dann (1997)
- Ben White (1998)
- Ben Juratowich (2003)
- Simon Quinn (2004)
- Damian Maher (2018)

== Cultural, political, and legal ==
- Ron Boswell – Senator, Father of the Australian Senate
- Shane Doyle KC - Judge of the Supreme Court of Queensland
- Bernard Fanning – lead singer of Powderfinger
- Bobby Flynn – finalist on 2006 Australian Idol
- Osher Günsberg – television, host of the Australian Bachelor franchise (The Bachelor, The Bachelorette, Bachelor In Paradise) & The Masked Singer
- Steve Hambleton – Australian Medical Association past President (2011–2014)
- Denis Handlin AO – former Chairman & Chief Executive Officer of Sony Music Entertainment Australia.
- John Hogg – Senator
- Patrick Keane – Justice of the High Court of Australia (since 2013), formerly Chief Justice of the Federal Court of Australia (2010–2013)
- Ben Lawson – actor on Neighbours
- Josh Lawson – actor and comedian
- Hugh Lunn – journalist and author.
- Brett Sheehy AO – artistic director, producer and curator
- Joseph Sheehy KBE – Senior Puisne Judge of the Queensland Supreme Court and Administrator of the State of Queensland
- Scott Tweedie – television, host of Australian Idol and The Loop.

== Sporting ==
- Marcus Allan – AFL (Brisbane Lions)
- Oliver Anderson – Tennis Player
- Connor Ballenden – AFL Footballer
- Ron Oxenham – Cricket Player (Australian Cricket Team and Queensland Cricket Team)
- Jordon Bourke – AFL (Brisbane Lions)
- Patrick Carrigan – Rugby League player (Brisbane Broncos)
- Mark Chisholm – Rugby union player (ACT Brumbies and Wallabies)
- Jimmy Clark – Rugby union player (Queensland Reds and Wallaby Captain)
- David Croft – Rugby union player (Queensland Reds and Wallabies)
- Mick Doohan – five time 500cc motorcycle Grand Prix champion
- Jimmy Flynn – Rugby union player (Queensland Reds and Wallaby Captain)
- Liam Gill – Rugby union player (Queensland Reds)
- Chris Handy – Rugby union player (Queensland and Australia).
- James Hanson – Rugby union player (Queensland Reds)
- Digby Ioane – Rugby union player (Queensland Reds and Wallabies)
- Ben Keays – AFL (Brisbane Lions and Adelaide Crows)
- Ben Lucas – Rugby union player (Queensland Reds)
- Michael Lynagh – Rugby union player (Queensland Reds and Wallaby Captain)
- Lachlan Maranta – Rugby league player (Brisbane Broncos)
- Jack Prestwidge – Cricket player (Brisbane Heat and Queensland cricket team)
- Will Prestwidge – Cricket player (Brisbane Heat and Queensland cricket team)
- Harry Roberts – rugby union player (Queensland Reds and Wallabies)
- Tony Shaw – rugby union player (Queensland Reds and Wallaby Captain)
- Glen Vaihu – (Melbourne Rebels)
- Rudi Vedelago – rugby union player (Western Force)
- Tom Williams – AFL (Western Bulldogs)
- Reuben William – AFL (Brisbane Lions)
- Harry Wilson – Rugby union player (Queensland Reds and Wallabies)
- Clem Windsor – Rugby union player (Queensland Reds and Wallabies)
- Logan Wade – Baseball (Australia and Brisbane Bandits)
- Thomas Neill – Olympic swimmer
