= Geoffrey Harding =

Medical practitioner

Geoffrey Alexander Harding OAM (born 1950), most often known as Geoff Harding, is a Brisbane-based medical practitioner and a recognized leader within the field of musculoskeletal medicine.

== Education ==
Harding was educated at Padua College (Brisbane), and subsequently studied medicine at the University of Queensland, graduating with a Bachelor of Medicine and Bachelor of Surgery degree in 1982. He undertook short courses in musculoskeletal medicine at the Hôtel-Dieu de Paris with Professor Robert Maigne, and Dr Jean-Yves Maigne. In 1995 he completed a Diploma in Musculoskeletal Medicine at the University of Otago.

== Professional career ==
Harding has operated a musculoskeletal clinic at suburban Sandgate in Queensland for a number of years. He has also served as a speaker and educator within the field of musculoskeletal medicine.

Harding notes that musculoskeletal pain is the most common pain affecting Australians, and this also has a high economic cost to the community. Harding, however, advocates a form of “self-efficacy”, that is, “putting the patient in control”, through carefully explaining what is happening. He maintains that this can have surprisingly positive results.

The work of Geoff Harding was recognized in 2017 with the awarding of an Order of Australia Medal. The citation reads: “For service to musculoskeletal medicine”.

== Personal life ==
Harding is a part-time musician, performing with a local band.
