= Terence Betts =

Terence Betts is the name of:

- Terry Betts (born 1943), English speedway rider
- Terence Betts (rugby) (1926–2017), Australian rugby union player
