= Murray Foy =

Australian actor

Murray Foy (1935–1998) was an Australian teacher, actor, and theatre director. He was born in Quirindi, New South Wales, and died in Toowoomba, Queensland.

He was educated at St Laurence's College Brisbane, and trained as a teacher at Kelvin Grove Teachers' College. He was accepted into the inaugural National Institute of Dramatic Art (NIDA) class in 1959, and graduated in 1960 with classmates Robyn Nevin and Edwin Hodgman among others. He continued working throughout his career as an actor, director, artistic director, playwright and theatre teacher. He also served on the Australia Council for the Arts (now Australia Council) Theatre Board during the 1970s.

He married actor Kathryn (Kate) Wilson in 1975. They had two children, born 1978 and 1979.

In 1989 Foy had a minor acting role in the 1988 TV series Mission: Impossible, where he played a character named 'Russell' in the episode "The Devils", which aired on 25 March.

== Theatre Appointments ==
- (Inaugural) Education Officer and associate director: Queensland Theatre Company 1970–1978;
- Senior Lecturer in Acting: Darling Downs Institution of Advanced Education (now University of Southern Queensland) 1978–1980;
- Artistic Director: New England Theatre Company: 1980–1987.
