= Great Public Schools Association of Queensland =

Association of secondary schools

Great Public Schools Association of Queensland Inc.
- Formation: 1918
- Headquarters: Brisbane, Queensland
- Members: Anglican Church Grammar School; Brisbane Boys' College; Brisbane Grammar School; Brisbane State High School; Ipswich Grammar School; St. Joseph's Nudgee College; St. Joseph's College, Gregory Terrace; The Southport School; Toowoomba Grammar School
- Official language: English
- General Secretary: Nicole L'Efevre

The Great Public Schools Association of Queensland Inc. (GPS) is an association of nine south-east Queensland secondary schools established in 1918. With the exception of Brisbane State High School, GPS schools are all-male, private schools. Similar associations exist in New South Wales (AAGPS) and Victoria (APS).

== Schools ==
=== Current member schools ===
There have been critics of the GPS competition of Brisbane State High's membership to the GPS Competition, primarily because it is the only Public School in the GPS competition. However, its membership is maintained despite dispute. The term "Public Schools" in the GPS acronym encompasses all public education including the Grammar Schools who are indeed themselves Public Schools. (Grammar Schools Act, 1860)

| School | Location | Enrolment | Founded | Denomination | Day/boarding | Year entered competition* | School colours | School nickname |
|---|---|---|---|---|---|---|---|---|
| Anglican Church Grammar School^{[note a]} | East Brisbane | 1,800 | 1912 | Anglican | Day & boarding | 1918 | Blue and grey | Churchie |
| Brisbane Boys' College | Toowong | 1,600 | 1902 | Uniting Church/Presbyterian | Day & boarding | 1918 | Green, white and black | BBC or College |
| Brisbane Grammar School | Spring Hill | 2,100 | 1868 | Secular or Non-denominational | Day & boarding | 1918 | Dark blue and light blue | Grammar or BGS |
| Brisbane State High School | South Brisbane | 3,361 (approximately 1,669 males) | 1913 | Secular | Day | 1921 | Cerise and navy blue | State High or Brisbane High |
| Ipswich Grammar School | Ipswich | 1,080 | 1863 | Non-denominational | Day & boarding | 1918 | Red and white | Ipswich or IGS |
| St Joseph's College, Nudgee | Boondall | 1,750 | 1891 | Catholic | Day & boarding | 1918 | Blue and white | Nudgee |
| St Joseph's College, Gregory Terrace | Spring Hill | 1,691 | 1875 | Catholic | Day | 1918 | Red & black | Terrace or Gregory Terrace |
| The Southport School | Southport | 1,305 | 1901 | Anglican | Day & boarding | 1920 | Maroon, navy and white | TSS or Southport |
| Toowoomba Grammar School | Toowoomba | 1,258 | 1875 | Non-denominational | Day & boarding | 1920 | Blue and gold | Toowoomba or TGS |

=== Former member schools ===
| School | Location | Enrolment | Founded | Denomination | Day/boarding | School colours | School nickname |
|---|---|---|---|---|---|---|---|
| St. Laurence's College | South Brisbane | 2000 | 1915 | Catholic | Day | Black and gold | Lauries |

Central Technical College High School, a Government-run school, was initially a member from 1918 but merged with Brisbane Junior State High School and High Top Wynnum State School in 1921* to form Brisbane State High School, which is still a member of the association.

St. Laurence's College was forced to leave the GPS in the 1920s because it did not have a cricket pitch and a football oval. They competed at least up to and including the September 23, 1928 Athletics Carnival. They are now members of the Associated Independent Colleges (AIC) competition.

== Physical recreation ==
=== Basketball ===
The schools have competed in an annual basketball premiership since 1986.

| School | Premierships | Outright | Shared | Outright years | Shared years |
|---|---|---|---|---|---|
| St Joseph's Nudgee College | 6 | 2 | 4 | 2001, 2003 | 1990, 1991, 1992, 1998 |
| Anglican Church Grammar School | 9 | 6 | 3 | 1988, 1989, 2008, 2013, 2014, 2020 | 1990, 2019, 2026 |
| Brisbane State High School | 11 | 6 | 5 | 1999, 2002, 2006, 2007, 2010, 2016 | 1998, 2000, 2004, 2011, 2022 |
| St Joseph's College, Gregory Terrace | 4 | 1 | 3 | 1997 | 2000, 2004, 2019 |
| The Southport School | 7 | 4 | 3 | 2009, 2012, 2021, 2023 | 2022, 2025, 2026 |
| Ipswich Grammar School | 10 | 6 | 4 | 1986, 1993, 1994, 1996, 2015, 2018 | 1991, 1992, 2025, 2026 |
| Toowoomba Grammar School | 1 | 0 | 1 | | 2022 |
| Brisbane Grammar School | 0 | 0 | 0 | | |
| Brisbane Boys' College | 5 | 4 | 1 | 1987, 1995, 2005, 2017 | 2005 |

Notes

- Results up to and including 2026 season.
- Brisbane State High School has been the most successful school in GPS Basketball based upon premierships.

=== Cricket ===
The schools have competed in an annual cricket premiership since 1919.

| School | Premierships | Outright | Shared | Outright years | Shared years |
|---|---|---|---|---|---|
| St Joseph's Nudgee College | 10 | 9 | 1 | 1925, 1937, 1938, 1964, 1991, 1994, 1998, 2001, 2009 | 1922 |
| Anglican Church Grammar School | 19 | 15 | 4 | 1934, 1935, 1940, 1941, 1948, 1950, 1959, 1963, 1967, 1976, 1984, 1996, 1997, 1999, 2012 | 1929, 1931, 1955, 1962 |
| Brisbane State High School | 7 | 7 | 0 | 1949, 1966, 1977, 1979, 1992, 1993, 2002 | |
| St Joseph's College, Gregory Terrace | 3 | 2 | 1 | 1952, 2004 | 2020 |
| The Southport School | 26 | 21 | 5 | 1926, 1927, 1970, 1972, 1973, 1974, 1980, 1981, 1982, 2010, 2011, 2014, 2015, 2017, 2018, 2019, 2021, 2023, 2024, 2025, 2026 | 1920, 1923, 1928, 1929, 1971 |
| Ipswich Grammar School | 13 | 12 | 1 | 1937, 1953, 1957, 1958, 1968, 1969, 1975, 1989, 2006, 2007, 2008, 2016 | 1922 |
| Toowoomba Grammar School | 12 | 10 | 2 | 1924, 1932, 1933, 1936, 1986, 1987, 1988, 1990, 2000, 2005 | 1923, 1928 |
| Brisbane Grammar School | 18 | 14 | 4 | 1919, 1921, 1930, 1946, 1951, 1954, 1956, 1960, 1961, 1965, 1978, 1983, 2013, 2022 | 1920, 1931, 1955, 1971 |
| Brisbane Boys' College | 6 | 4 | 2 | 1947, 1985, 1995, 2003 | 1962, 2020 |

Notes

- No competition held from 1942 to 1945 inclusive due to World War II.
- Current Premiers (2026): The Southport School
- Results up to and including the 2026 season.
- The Southport School has been the most successful school in GPS Cricket based upon premierships.

=== Cross Country ===
The schools have competed in an annual cross-country championship since 1971.

| School | Wins | Outright | Shared | Outright years | Shared years |
|---|---|---|---|---|---|
| St Joseph's Nudgee College | 4 | 3 | 1 | 1999, 2005, 2015 | 2010 |
| Anglican Church Grammar School | 17 | 15 | 2 | 1971, 1972, 1973, 1976, 1977, 1978, 1980, 1983, 1985, 1986, 1987, 1988, 1989, 2009, 2012 | 1975, 2007 |
| Brisbane State High School | 5 | 5 | 0 | 2020, 2021, 2023, 2025, 2026 | |
| St Joseph's College, Gregory Terrace | 9 | 7 | 2 | 2001, 2002, 2003, 2008, 2011, 2013, 2014 | 2004, 2010 |
| The Southport School | 1 | 1 | 0 | 1990 | |
| Ipswich Grammar School | 4 | 2 | 2 | 1991, 1992 | 2004, 2007 |
| Toowoomba Grammar School | 0 | 0 | 0 | | |
| Brisbane Grammar School | 16 | 15 | 1 | 1974, 1979, 1981, 1982, 1984, 1993, 1994, 1995, 1996, 1997, 1998, 2000, 2006, 2016, 2017 | 1975 |
| Brisbane Boys' College | 4 | 4 | 0 | 2018, 2019, 2022, 2024 | |

Notes

- Current Premiers (2026): Brisbane State High School
- Results up to and including 2026 competition.
- Anglican Church Grammar School has been the most successful school in GPS Cross Country based upon premierships.

=== Junior Cross Country ===
The schools have competed in an annual cross-country championship since 2014.

| School | Wins | Outright | Shared | Outright years | Shared years |
|---|---|---|---|---|---|
| St Joseph's Nudgee College | 7 | 6 | 1 | 2015, 2016, 2017, 2018, 2020, 2021 | 2019 |
| Anglican Church Grammar School | 6 | 5 | 1 | 2014, 2022, 2023, 2024, 2025 | 2019 |
| Ipswich Grammar School | 1 | 1 | 0 | 2026 | |
| Brisbane State High School | 0 | 0 | 0 | | |
| St Joseph's College, Gregory Terrace | 0 | 0 | 0 | | |
| The Southport School | 0 | 0 | 0 | | |
| Toowoomba Grammar School | 0 | 0 | 0 | | |
| Brisbane Grammar School | 0 | 0 | 0 | | |
| Brisbane Boys' College | 0 | 0 | 0 | | |

Notes

- Current Premiers (2026): Ipswich Grammar School
- Results up to and including 2026 competition.
- Nudgee College has been the most successful school in Junior GPS Cross Country based upon premierships.

=== Gymnastics ===
The schools have competed in an annual gymnastics competition from 1915 to 2020, making it the oldest GPS sport, dating before the establishment of the GPS Association in 1918.

| School | Wins | Outright | Shared | Outright years | Shared years |
|---|---|---|---|---|---|
| St Joseph's Nudgee College | 3 | 3 | 0 | 1916, 1920, 1996 | |
| Anglican Church Grammar School | 15 | 15 | 0 | 1940, 1949, 1952, 1954, 1955, 1964, 1965, 1969, 1988, 1989, 1990, 1991, 1997, 2002, 2003 | |
| St Joseph's College, Gregory Terrace | 5 | 4 | 1 | 1919, 1941, 1942, 1995 | 1994 |
| The Southport School | 7 | 7 | 0 | 1935, 1936, 1962, 1963, 2008, 2009, 2010 | |
| Toowoomba Grammar School | 2 | 1 | 1 | 1993 | 1994 |
| Brisbane Grammar School | 63 | 62 | 1 | 1915, 1917, 1918, 1921, 1922, 1923, 1925, 1926, 1927, 1928, 1933, 1934, 1937, 1939, 1943, 1944, 1945, 1946, 1947, 1948, 1950, 1951, 1953, 1957, 1958, 1959, 1960, 1961, 1966, 1967, 1968, 1970, 1971, 1972, 1973, 1974, 1975, 1976, 1977, 1978, 1979, 1980, 1981, 1982, 1983, 1984, 1985, 1986, 1987, 1992, 2005, 2006, 2011, 2012, 2013, 2014, 2015, 2016, 2017, 2018, 2019, 2020 | 2004 |
| Brisbane Boys' College | 6 | 5 | 1 | 1998, 1999, 2000, 2001, 2007 | 2004 |

Notes

- Ipswich Grammar School has never competed in gymnastics. Anglican Church Grammar School, Toowoomba Grammar School and Nudgee College no longer consistently compete in gymnastics (occasionally, small teams/individuals have represented these schools at the championships).
- Although never officially involved, Brisbane State High School has occasionally been represented by individual athletes.
- Gymnastics was contested between schools in 1915, 1916 and 1917, prior to the founding of the GPS in 1918, with Brisbane Grammar School, Nudgee College and Brisbane Grammar School winning in the respective years
- No competition in 1924 or from 1929 to 1932 inclusive.
- Results up to and including 2020 competition.
- Brisbane Grammar School in 2012 won Division 3 by 0.5 points and Division 1 by 0.1 points, while losing Division 2 by over 20.0 points. It has been unofficially dubbed one of the greatest premierships in GPS history.
- Brisbane Grammar School has been the most successful school in GPS Gymnastics based upon premierships.
- Brisbane Grammar School has over a decade-long premiership, winning all championships from 2011 and 2025.
- GPS Gymnastics has been officially discontinued after the 2020 GPS Championships on September 5, ending with a 105 year history. This was due to a continuing decline of participating students and viable competition across all schools, making GPS Gymnastics one of two sports to be discontinued by the GPS Association.
- The GPS Gymnastics Foundation Cup has been contested since 2021

=== Gymnastics Foundation Cup ===
GPS Gymnastics was officially discontinued after the 2020 GPS Championships on September 5, ending with a 105 year history. This was due to a continuing decline of participating students and viable competition across all schools, making GPS Gymnastics one of two sports to be discontinued by the GPS Association. The GPS Gymnastics Foundation Cup has been contested since 2021.

| School | Wins | Outright | Shared | Outright years | Shared years |
|---|---|---|---|---|---|
| Anglican Church Grammar School | 0 | 0 | 0 | | |
| St Joseph's College, Gregory Terrace | 0 | 0 | 0 | | |
| The Southport School | 0 | 0 | 0 | | |
| Brisbane State High School | 0 | 0 | 0 | | |
| Brisbane Grammar School | 5 | 5 | 0 | 2021, 2022, 2023, 2024, 2025 | |
| Brisbane Boys' College | 0 | 0 | 0 | | |

Notes

- Ipswich Grammar School has never competed in gymnastics. Toowoomba Grammar School and Nudgee College no longer consistently compete in gymnastics (occasionally, small teams/individuals have represented these schools at the championships).
- Results up to and including 2025 competition.
- Brisbane Grammar School has been the most successful school in the GPS Gymnastics Foundation Cup based upon premierships.
- Brisbane Grammar School has over a decade-long premiership, winning all championships/Foundation Cups from 2011 and 2025.

=== Rowing ===
The schools have competed in an annual Head of the River rowing championship since 1918.

| School | Wins |
|---|---|
| Brisbane Boys' College | 27 |
| The Southport School | 24 |
| Brisbane Grammar School | 21 |
| Anglican Church Grammar School | 16 |
| Brisbane State High School | 5 |
| St. Joseph's College, Gregory Terrace | 4 |
| St. Joseph's Nudgee College | 9 |

Notes

- Ipswich Grammar School and Toowoomba Grammar School do not take part in rowing competition.
- Gregory Terrace first competed in 1928 but did not compete again until 1954.
- Nudgee College first competed in 2002.
- No competition 1942 to 1945 inclusive due to World War II.
- There have been 2 ties for first place – 1928 and 1965.
- In all, there have been 5 ties for a podium (1st, 2nd, or 3rd) position; the most recent of which was for 3rd in the 2019 race.
- A "No Race" was declared in 1983 due to multiple protests regarding the outcome of the race.
- Results up to and including 2026.
- Brisbane Boys' College has been the most successful school in GPS Rowing based upon 1st VIII premierships.

The schools have also competed for the Old Boys Cup for best overall school at Head of the River since 1988.

| School | Wins |
|---|---|
| Anglican Church Grammar School | 5 |
| Brisbane Boys' College | 9 |
| Brisbane Grammar School | 4 |
| The Southport School | 10 |
| St Joseph's College, Gregory Terrace | 4 |
| St Joseph's Nudgee College | 7 |
| Brisbane State High School | 0 |

Notes

- There has been 1 tie for first place – 2012.
- Not awarded in 2010 due to inclement weather conditions.
- Results up to and including 2026.
- Brisbane Boys College and The Southport School have been the most successful schools in the Old Boys' Cup.

=== Rugby ===
The schools have competed in an annual rugby premiership since 1918 (initially playing rugby league until 1928, when the schools reverted to rugby union).

| School | Premierships | Outright | Shared | Outright years | Shared years |
|---|---|---|---|---|---|
| St. Joseph's Nudgee College | 47 | 39 | 8 | 1920, 1921, 1923, 1925, 1928, 1929, 1931, 1935, 1936, 1937, 1940, 1941, 1946, 1952, 1953, 1960, 1961, 1965, 1966, 1970, 1971, 1986, 1987, 1990, 1991, 1994, 1995, 1997, 1998, 2000, 2002, 2008, 2011, 2013, 2018, 2023, 2024, 2025, 2026 | 1924, 1932, 1950, 1954, 1993, 2010, 2017, 2022 |
| Anglican Church Grammar School | 19 | 13 | 6 | 1939, 1949, 1951, 1955, 1957, 1959, 1962, 1963, 1967, 1982, 1999, 2014, 2015 | 1950, 1954, 1974, 2003, 2005, 2022 |
| Brisbane State High School | 15 | 7 | 8 | 1947, 1964, 1969, 1975, 1983, 2009, 2016 | 1973, 1974, 1976, 1984, 1992, 1993, 2005, 2010 |
| St Joseph's College, Gregory Terrace | 10 | 8 | 2 | 1927, 1977, 1978, 1979, 1980, 1981, 1996, 2004 | 1954, 1956 |
| The Southport School | 12 | 8 | 4 | 1922, 1926, 1933, 1938, 2001, 2006, 2007, 2019 | 2003, 2010, 2017, 2022 |
| Ipswich Grammar School | 8 | 6 | 2 | 1918, 1919, 1934, 1985, 1988, 1989 | 1984, 1993 |
| Toowoomba Grammar School | 6 | 2 | 4 | 1930, 1948 | 1924, 1932, 1954, 1956 |
| Brisbane Grammar School | 7 | 3 | 4 | 1958, 1972, 2012 | 1956, 1973, 1976, 1992 |
| Brisbane Boys' College | 2 | 1 | 1 | 2020 | 1954 |

Notes

- Premiers are determined by win–loss records only and not by bonus points or points differential.
- St. Joseph's College, Nudgee has been the most successful school in GPS Rugby based upon premierships.
- No competition 1942 to 1945 inclusive due to World War II.
- No competition 2020 due to the COVID-19 pandemic.

=== Sailing ===
An annual sailing competition was instigated in 2000.

| School | Wins | Win years |
|---|---|---|
| The Southport School | 8 | 2002, 2003, 2014, 2015, 2016, 2017, 2018, 2019 |
| Anglican Church Grammar School | 4 | 2001, 2004, 2009, 2010 |
| Brisbane Grammar School | 4 | 2000, 2005, 2006, 2013 |
| Brisbane Boys' College | 3 | 2007, 2008, 2011 |
| Brisbane State High School | 0 | |

Notes

- Gregory Terrace, Nudgee College, Toowoomba Grammar School and Ipswich Grammar School do not compete in sailing.
- The sailing competition is competed in a fleet sailing format where the top three results from each school contribute to that schools result.
- Not awarded in 2012 due to bad weather.
- Not awarded in 2020 due to COVID-19
- Up to and including 2019.
- The Southport School has been the most successful school in GPS Sailing based upon premierships.
- GPS Sailing has been officially discontinued after the 2020 GPS Championships, ending with a 21 year history. This was due to a continuing decline of participating students and viable competition across all schools, making GPS Sailing one of two sports to be discontinued by the GPS Association.
- The GPS Sailing Foundation Cup has been contested since 2021.

=== Sailing Foundation Cup ===
GPS Sailing has been officially discontinued after the 2020 GPS Championships, ending with a 21 year history. This was due to a continuing decline of participating students and viable competition across all schools, making GPS Sailing one of two sports to be discontinued by the GPS Association. The GPS Sailing Foundation Cup has been contested since 2021.

| School | Wins | Win years |
|---|---|---|
| The Southport School | 3 | 2021, 2023, 2024 |
| Anglican Church Grammar School | 0 | |
| Brisbane Grammar School | 1 | 2022 |
| Brisbane Boys' College | 0 | |
| Brisbane State High School | 0 | |

Notes

- Gregory Terrace, Nudgee College, Toowoomba Grammar School and Ipswich Grammar School do not compete in sailing.
- Anglican Church Grammar School no longer competes in the GPS Sailing Foundation Cup.
- Students from Brisbane State High School began competing in school sailing in January 2025.
- The sailing competition is competed in a fleet sailing format where the top three results from each school contribute to that schools result.
- Results up to and including 2024.
- The Southport School has been the most successful school in the GPS Sailing Foundation Cup based upon premierships.

=== Football ===
The schools have competed in an annual Association football competition since 1991.

| School | Wins | Outright | Shared | Outright years | Shared years |
|---|---|---|---|---|---|
| Brisbane Grammar School | 7 | 4 | 3 | 1992, 1994, 2000, 2007 | 1999, 2006, 2025 |
| Ipswich Grammar School | 7 | 5 | 2 | 1996, 2008, 2009, 2017 | 1998, 1999 |
| Brisbane Boys' College | 5 | 5 | 0 | 1991, 1993, 2004, 2010, 2011 | 2026 |
| St Joseph's Nudgee College | 12 | 7 | 5 | 1995, 1997, 2001, 2003, 2018, 2022, 2023 | 1998, 2013, 2014, 2016, 2025, 2026 |
| Brisbane State High School | 2 | 1 | 1 | 2005 | 2006 |
| Anglican Church Grammar School | 2 | 2 | 0 | 2019, 2024 | |
| St Joseph's College, Gregory Terrace | 1 | 1 | 0 | 2021 | |
| The Southport School | 4 | 2 | 2 | 2012, 2020 | 2013, 2014 |
| Toowoomba Grammar School | 2 | 1 | 1 | 2015 | 2016 |

Notes

- Current Premiers (2026): Brisbane Boys College and St. Joseph's Nudgee College
- Up to and including 2026.
- St. Joseph's Nudgee College have been the most successful schools in GPS Football based upon premierships.

=== Swimming ===
The schools have competed in an annual swimming competition since 1918.

| School | Wins | Outright | Shared | Outright years | Shared years |
|---|---|---|---|---|---|
| St Joseph's Nudgee College | 24 | 23 | 1 | 1923, 1992, 1993, 1994, 1995, 1996, 1997, 1998, 1999, 2000, 2001, 2002, 2003, 2006, 2009, 2010, 2011, 2012, 2019, 2020, 2021, 2023, 2025 | 1954 |
| Anglican Church Grammar School | 21 | 21 | 0 | 1930, 1937, 1939, 1940, 1941, 1943, 1944, 1945, 1946, 1947, 1948, 1949, 1950, 1956, 1960, 1961, 1962, 1963, 1964, 1965, 2014 | |
| Brisbane State High School | 13 | 13 | 0 | 1933, 1968, 1969, 1978, 1979, 1980, 1981, 1982, 1983, 1984, 1985, 1986, 1987 | |
| St Joseph's College, Gregory Terrace | 16 | 15 | 1 | 1918, 1919, 1921, 1952, 1953, 1955, 1957, 1958, 1959, 1970, 1987, 1988, 1989, 1900, 1991 | 1954 |
| The Southport School | 8 | 8 | 0 | 1922, 2004, 2005, 2007, 2008, 2013, 2015, 2016 | |
| Ipswich Grammar School | 0 | 0 | 0 | | |
| Toowoomba Grammar School | 1 | 1 | 0 | 1935 | |
| Brisbane Grammar School | 21 | 21 | 0 | 1920, 1924, 1925, 1926, 1927, 1928, 1929, 1931, 1934, 1936, 1971, 1972, 1973, 1974, 1975, 1976, 1977, 2017, 2018, 2022, 2024 2026 | |
| Brisbane Boys' College | 0 | 0 | 0 | | |

Notes

- No competition took place in 1932, 1938, 1942, 1951, 1966 or 1967.
- Up to and including 2025.
- Nudgee College has been the most successful school in GPS Swimming based upon premierships.

=== Junior Swimming ===
The schools have competed in an annual swimming competition since 2014.

| School | Wins | Outright | Shared | Outright years | Shared years |
|---|---|---|---|---|---|
| St Joseph's Nudgee College | 3 | 3 | 0 | 2019, 2022, 2023 | |
| Anglican Church Grammar School | 4 | 4 | 0 | 2014, 2015, 2020, 2021 | |
| Brisbane State High School | 0 | 0 | 0 | | |
| St Joseph's College, Gregory Terrace | 3 | 3 | 0 | 2018, 2024, 2025 | |
| The Southport School | 1 | 1 | 0 | 2016 | |
| Ipswich Grammar School | 0 | 0 | 0 | | |
| Toowoomba Grammar School | 0 | 0 | 0 | | |
| Brisbane Grammar School | 0 | 0 | 0 | | |
| Brisbane Boys' College | 1 | 1 | 0 | 2017 | |

Notes

- Up to and including 2025.
- Anglican Church Grammar School has been the most successful school in Junior GPS Swimming based upon premierships.

=== Tennis ===
The schools have competed in an annual Tennis competition since 1918.

| School | Wins | Outright | Shared | Outright years | Shared years |
|---|---|---|---|---|---|
| St Joseph's Nudgee College | 10 | 7 | 3 | 1935, 1936, 1988, 1989, 1990, 1993, 1994 | 2003, 2011, 2013 |
| Anglican Church Grammar School | 11 | 8 | 3 | 1958, 1960, 1961, 1962, 1996, 1997, 2004, 2005 | 1941, 1948, 1957 |
| Brisbane State High School | 5 | 4 | 1 | 1954, 1959, 1973, 1984 | 1972 |
| St Joseph's College, Gregory Terrace | 7 | 5 | 2 | 1955, 1992, 1995, 1998, 1999 | 2002, 2003 |
| The Southport School | 9 | 6 | 3 | 1924, 1926, 1930, 1956, 2000, 2001 | 1921, 1934, 2018 |
| Ipswich Grammar School | 6 | 2 | 4 | 1929, 2010 | 1921, 1941, 2002, 2009 |
| Toowoomba Grammar School | 12 | 10 | 2 | 1927, 1932, 1937, 1938, 1939, 1940, 1946, 1947, 1949, 1952 | 1948, 1957 |
| Brisbane Grammar School | 43 | 36 | 7 | 1918, 1919, 1920, 1922, 1923, 1925, 1928, 1931, 1933, 1950, 1951, 1953, 1963, 1964, 1965, 1966, 1967, 1968, 1969, 1970, 1971, 1974, 1975, 1976, 1977, 1978, 1979, 1980, 1981, 1982, 1985, 1986, 1991, 2012, 2021, 2022 | 1921, 1934, 1972, 2003, 2009, 2011, 2013 |
| Brisbane Boys' College | 18 | 14 | 4 | 1983, 1987, 2006, 2007, 2008, 2014, 2015, 2016, 2017, 2019, 2020, 2023, 2024, 2025, 2026 | 1934, 2011, 2013, 2018 |

Notes

- No competition took place from 1939 to 1945 inclusive due to World War II.
- Up to and including 2026.
- Brisbane Grammar School has been the most successful school in GPS Tennis based upon premierships.
- In 2024, Brisbane Boys College's First IV became the first school to go back-to-back in the Gallipoli Youth Cup since Maribyrnong College (VIC) in 2014-2015. The team consisted of Rohan Hazratwala (1), Anirudh Nallaparaju (2), Heaton Pann (3), William Genberg (4), Cyrus Wong (5), Kaylen Timbrell (6).

=== Track and Field ===
The schools have competed in an annual athletics competition since 1918.

| School | Wins | Outright | Shared | Outright years | Shared years |
|---|---|---|---|---|---|
| St Joseph's Nudgee College | 18 | 17 | 1 | 1920, 1921, 1931, 1940, 1955, 1969, 1970, 1993, 1996, 1997, 2006, 2010, 2013, 2014, 2015, 2021, 2023 | 1919 |
| Anglican Church Grammar School | 21 | 19 | 2 | 1923, 1943, 1944, 1949, 1952, 1953, 1954, 1956, 1957, 1958, 1959, 1960, 1961, 1962, 1963, 1964, 1965, 1973, 1974 | 1929, 1935 |
| Brisbane State High School | 14 | 14 | 0 | 1946, 1947, 1966, 1967, 1968, 1975, 1976, 1977, 1978, 1979, 1980, 1981, 1982, 1983 | |
| St Joseph's College, Gregory Terrace | 5 | 5 | 0 | 1927, 1930, 1934, 1950, 1951 | |
| The Southport School | 5 | 3 | 2 | 1918, 1922, 1933 | 1919, 1929 |
| Ipswich Grammar School | 26 | 26 | 0 | 1984, 1985, 1986, 1987, 1990, 1991, 1992, 1998, 1999, 2000, 2001, 2002, 2003, 2004, 2005, 2007, 2008, 2009, 2011, 2012, 2019, 2020, 2022, 2024, 2025, 2026 | |
| Toowoomba Grammar School | 3 | 3 | 0 | 1945, 1971, 1972 | |
| Brisbane Grammar School | 14 | 13 | 1 | 1924, 1926, 1928, 1932, 1936, 1937, 1938, 1941, 1948, 1988, 1989, 1994, 1995 | 1935 |
| Brisbane Boys' College | 6 | 6 | 0 | 1925, 1939, 1942, 2016, 2017, 2018 | |

Notes

- Current Premiers (2026): Ipswich Grammar School
- Up to and including 2026
- Ipswich Grammar School has been the most successful school in GPS Track & Field based upon premierships.

=== Junior Track and Field ===
The schools have competed in an annual athletics competition since 2014.

| School | Wins | Outright | Shared | Outright years | Shared years |
|---|---|---|---|---|---|
| St Joseph's Nudgee College | 6 | 6 | 0 | 2015, 2017, 2019, 2020, 2021, 2022 | |
| Anglican Church Grammar School | 2 | 2 | 0 | 2014, 2018 | |
| Brisbane State High School | 0 | 0 | 0 | | |
| St Joseph's College, Gregory Terrace | 0 | 0 | 0 | | |
| The Southport School | 0 | 0 | 0 | | |
| Ipswich Grammar School | 3 | 3 | 0 | 2024, 2025, 2026 | |
| Toowoomba Grammar School | 0 | 0 | 0 | | |
| Brisbane Grammar School | 1 | 1 | 0 | 2023 | |
| Brisbane Boys' College | 1 | 1 | 0 | 2016 | |

Notes

- Up to and including 2026
- Nudgee College has been the most successful school in Junior GPS Track & Field based upon premierships.

=== Volleyball ===
The schools have competed in an annual volleyball premiership since 1994.

| School | Wins | Outright | Shared | Outright years | Shared years |
|---|---|---|---|---|---|
| St Joseph's Nudgee College | 3 | 1 | 2 | 2022 | 2002, 2025 |
| Anglican Church Grammar School | 7 | 6 | 1 | 1998, 2016, 2017, 2018, 2023, 2024 | 2020 |
| Brisbane State High School | 0 | 0 | 0 | | |
| St Joseph's College, Gregory Terrace | 10 | 4 | 6 | 1997, 2014, 2021, 2026 | 1996, 2000, 2010, 2015, 2020, 2025 |
| The Southport School | 0 | 0 | 0 | | |
| Ipswich Grammar School | 1 | 0 | 1 | | 2002 |
| Toowoomba Grammar School | 0 | 0 | 0 | | |
| Brisbane Grammar School | 14 | 10 | 4 | 2003, 2004, 2005, 2006, 2007, 2008, 2009, 2011, 2012, 2013 | 2000, 2010, 2015, 2020 |
| Brisbane Boys' College | 6 | 5 | 1 | 1994, 1995, 1999, 2001, 2019 | 1996 |

Notes

- Up to and including 2026
- The Southport School now takes part in volleyball as of the 2026 season.
- Brisbane Grammar School has been the most successful school in GPS Volleyball based upon premierships.

=== Former sports ===
- Shooting (abandoned in 1974)

== Academic Events ==
=== Chess ===
The schools have competed in an annual chess premiership since 1995.

| School | Premierships | Outright | Shared | Outright years | Shared years |
|---|---|---|---|---|---|
| St Joseph's Nudgee College | 0 | 0 | 0 | | |
| Anglican Church Grammar School | 17 | 16 | 1 | 1997, 1998, 1999, 2000, 2001, 2002, 2008, 2015, 2017, 2018, 2020, 2021, 2022, 2023, 2024, 2026 | 2010 |
| Brisbane State High School | 2 | 2 | 0 | 2004, 2005 | |
| St Joseph's College, Gregory Terrace | 0 | 0 | 0 | | |
| The Southport School | 0 | 0 | 0 | | |
| Ipswich Grammar School | 0 | 0 | 0 | | |
| Toowoomba Grammar School | 1 | 0 | 1 | | 2006 |
| Brisbane Grammar School | 14 | 12 | 2 | 1995, 1996, 2003, 2007, 2009, 2011, 2012, 2013, 2014, 2016, 2019, 2025 | 2006, 2010 |
| Brisbane Boys' College | 0 | 0 | 0 | | |

Notes

- Current Premiers (2026): Anglican Church Grammar School
- Results up to and including 2026 season.
- Anglican Church Grammar School has been the most successful school in GPS Chess based upon premierships.

=== Debating ===
The schools have competed in an annual debating premiership since 2002.

| School | Premierships | Outright | Shared | Outright years | Shared years |
|---|---|---|---|---|---|
| St Joseph's Nudgee College | 0 | 0 | 0 | | |
| Anglican Church Grammar School | 4 | 4 | 0 | 2007, 2012, 2020, 2022 | |
| Brisbane State High School | 2 | 1 | 1 | 2025 | 2024 |
| St Joseph's College, Gregory Terrace | 5 | 3 | 2 | 2006, 2019, 2023 | 2002, 2005 |
| The Southport School | 0 | 0 | 0 | | |
| Ipswich Grammar School | 0 | 0 | 0 | | |
| Toowoomba Grammar School | 0 | 0 | 0 | | |
| Brisbane Grammar School | 16 | 13 | 3 | 2003, 2004, 2008, 2009, 2010, 2011, 2013, 2014, 2015, 2016, 2017, 2018, 2021 | 2002, 2005, 2024 |
| Brisbane Boys' College | 0 | 0 | 0 | | |

Notes

- Results up to and including 2025
- Brisbane Grammar School has been the most successful school in GPS Debating based upon premierships.

=== GPS Music Showcase ===
The GPS Competition holds an Annual Music Showcase where member schools present a set repertoire that is decided by the school who is hosting for that particular year. Students then rehearse for a final concert which, in 2019, was held in the Queensland Performing Arts Centre (QPAC). The event celebrates the creative talent of students across all 9 of the member schools.

Additionally, there was previously GPS Shooting which got removed because of safety hazards. Toowoomba Grammar School had very many premierships in the time it was a GPS competition. When the GPS allowed you to enter 3 teams, Toowoomba Grammar School won 1st, 2nd and 3rd.

== See also ==
- Education in Australia
- Queensland Girls' Secondary Schools Sports Association
- Associated Independent Colleges
- The Associated Schools
- Athletic Association of the Great Public Schools of New South Wales
- Associated Public Schools of Victoria

== Notes ==
- ^a: Formerly known as Church of England Grammar School.
- ^b: Co-educational school.
