= Matthew Hickey =

Australian barrister, singer and songwriter

Matthew Hickey OAM KC
- Born: 14 May 1975 (age 51); Ipswich, Australia
- Citizenship: Australian
- Occupation: Barrister
- Spouse: Bianca Hickey (m. 2002)
- Children: 3
- Awards: Medal of the Order of Australia, Centenary Medal
- Website: www.level27chambers.com.au/barristers/matthew-hickey/

Matthew Thomas Hickey OAM KC (born 14 May 1975) is an Australian barrister. He was formerly a singer, songwriter, producer and director.

== Education ==
Hickey was born in Ipswich, Australia. He was educated at St Edmund's College, Ipswich and later attended the University of Queensland, from which he graduated with a Bachelor of Arts (majoring in political science), and the Queensland University of Technology, from which he obtained a Bachelor of Laws (Hons) and a Master of Music.

== Music career ==
Hickey started his career as a boy soprano, training with Blodwyn Whitehead OAM. In 1988, he made his professional debut with the St Lucia Orchestra in the Concert Hall at the Queensland Performing Arts Centre and, in the same year, appeared as a treble in Opera Queensland's production of Tosca. In 1990 he made his debut at the Sydney Opera House, performing as a featured soloist with the Australian National Youth Choir.

Later, Hickey studied towards a Bachelor of Music in opera at the Queensland Conservatorium Griffith University, where he was a student of Professor Janet Delpratt AM. He won numerous prizes and awards, and appeared in masterclasses with the likes of Dame Joan Sutherland and Olaf Bär. As an operatic tenor, he performed with Opera Queensland, the Queensland Symphony Orchestra, the Queensland Philharmonic Orchestra, the Queensland Pops Orchestra and various chamber ensembles.

In 1998, while an undergraduate, together with fellow students, Hickey developed The Ten Tenors, of which he was a member, director and executive producer until 2010. During that time, The Ten Tenors: were awarded numerous gold and platinum albums in Australia and abroad; recorded at Abbey Road Studios and at Sir George Martin's Air Studios, London; collaborated with Oscar-winning composer John Barry and Grammy-award winning producer Simon Franglen; and performed at high-profile venues worldwide, including the Royal Albert Hall in London, the Kodak Theatre in Los Angeles, the Deutsches Schauspielhaus in Hamburg and the Sydney Opera House.

Hickey toured extensively with the ensemble all over the world, particularly in the US and Europe, performing an estimated 1500 shows with them, and he performed on or produced (or both) the following:

CD

- 1998 – Tenorissimo!
- 1999 – Colours
- 2000 – Untied (also known as One Is Not Enough in Europe)
- 2001 – A Not So Silent Night
- 2004 – Larger Than Life
- 2005 – Tenology (The Best of So Far...) No. 8 AUS
- 2005 – A Not So Silent Night (remastered and remixed with new tracks, available at concerts in Germany and as bonus CD with Tenology Limited Christmas Edition in the USA)
- 2006 – Here's to the Heroes No. 8 AUS
- 2008 – Nostalgica No. 27 AUS
- 2011 – Nostalgica – International Edition (with bonus tracks from their performance on Oprah's Ultimate Adventure)

VHS/DVD

- 2000 – Colours – VHS (Australia & New Zealand only)
- 2002 – One Is Not Enough – DVD (Europe only)
- 2004 – Larger Than Life – DVD (USA, Canada & Australia only)
- 2006 – Here's to the Heroes – DVD
- 2009 – Amigos Para Siempre CD/DVD pack

In 2001 he was awarded the Centenary Medal for distinguished service to the Australian music industry.

== Legal career ==
Since 2010, Hickey has practiced as a barrister in Queensland. He is a member of Level Twenty Seven Chambers. In 2016, 2017 and 2018 he was recognised by Doyle's Guide to the Australian Legal Profession as one of Queensland's leading building and construction barristers.

In 2018, Hickey achieved prominence acting for liquidators in high-profile litigation against Clive Palmer and his companies, and in appearances for one of the families during the Coronial Inquest into the deaths of 4 people at Dreamworld in 2016.

== Public life ==
Hickey is a member of the board of the Breast and Prostate Cancer Association of Queensland.
