= Harry Roberts (rugby union, born 1939) =

Australia international rugby union player

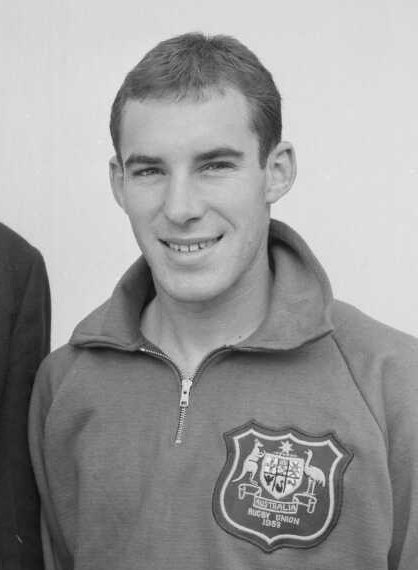
- Roberts in 1958
- Born: Henry Flexmore Roberts; 27 February 1939 (age 87) Brisbane, Queensland
- School: St Joseph's College, Gregory Terrace

Rugby union career
- Position: fly-half
International career
Years	Team	Apps	(Points)
1961	Wallabies	4	(0)

Henry Flexmore "Harry" Roberts (born 27 February 1939) was a rugby union player who represented Australia.

Roberts, a fly-half, was born in Brisbane, Queensland and claimed four international rugby caps for Australia. He represented Terrace Rugby as a 1st XV player from year 10 to 12 (1954–56) including the 56' premiership team.
