= Edmund Rice Education Australia =

Christian organisation in Australia

- Abbreviation: EREA
- Named after: Edmund Ignatius Rice
- Established: 1 October 2007; 19 years ago
- Headquarters: Albert Park, Melbourne, Victoria, Australia
- Origins: Congregation of Christian Brothers
- Region served: Australia
- Members: 55 schools (2021)
- Executive Director: Dr Liam Smith
- Parent organization: Congregation of Christian Brothers in Australia
- Staff: 4,500 (2021)
- Students: 39,000 (2021)
- Website: www.erea.edu.au

Edmund Rice Education Australia (EREA) is an organisation established by the Congregation of Christian Brothers in Australia to own, govern, manage, and conduct education ministries in the Catholic tradition and in the charism of Blessed Edmund Ignatius Rice. As of 2021, EREA included 55 member schools.

EREA was established on 1 October 2007 when the Christian Brothers decided to amalgamate separate Christian Brothers provinces in Australia, New Zealand, and Papua New Guinea to form an Oceania Province that was solely focused on the social justice mission of the Christian Brothers. The Christian Brothers' National Planning Committee for Schools Governance decided to form a separate body, Edmund Rice Education Australia, with the intention of independently implementing the educational mission of the Christian Brothers.

== Governance ==
Council

Comprising five people, the Council is the body ultimately responsible for the governance of EREA. In civil law, the Council constitutes the Trustees of Edmund Rice Education Australia.

Board

Comprising eight people, the Board is appointed by the EREA Council.

== Educational institutions ==
=== Australia ===
The national office for EREA is located in Albert Park, Victoria. Member schools agree to the Charter for Catholic Schools in the Edmund Rice tradition which was first used in 2004 and revised in 2011 to include four primary Touchstones. As of 2021, EREA included 55 schools, 4,500 staff, and over 39,000 students. In addition, in 2016 EREA established the Flexible Schools Networks, a network of 22 educational institutions across Australia that provide inclusive and non-discriminating learning opportunities.

State/Territory	Schools	Flexible Learning Centres
Australian Capital Territory	St Edmund's College, Canberra	
New South Wales	Christian Brothers' High School, Lewisham; Edmund Rice College, Wollongong; St Dominic's College, Penrith; St Edmund's College, Wahroonga; St Edward's College, Gosford; St Gabriel's School, Castle Hill; St Patrick's College, Strathfield; St Pius X College, Chatswood; Waverley College, Waverley	Pambula Beach; St Laurence (Newcastle); St Marys; Wollongong
Northern Territory		Oscar Romero (St Joseph's), Alice Springs
Queensland	Ambrose Treacy College, Indooroopilly; Ignatius Park College, Townsville; Indooroopilly Montessori Children's House; St Brendan's College, Yeppoon; St Edmund's College, Ipswich; St James College, Brisbane; St Joseph's College, Gregory Terrace; St Joseph's Nudgee College, Boondall; St Laurence's College, South Brisbane; St Patrick's College, Shorncliffe	Marlene Moore, Deception Bay; Marlene Moore, Gympie; Marlene Moore, Hemmant; Marlene Moore, Noosa; Wollemi, Albert Park; Wollemi, Mount Isa; Wollemi, Rockhampton; Wollemi, Southport; Xavier, Brisbane; Xavier, Inala (Brisbane); Xavier, Ipswich; Xavier, Townsville, Bowen, Burdekin
South Australia	Christian Brothers College, Adelaide; Rostrevor College, Woodforde; St Paul's College, Gilles Plains	Oscar Romero, Adelaide; Oscar Romero, Elizabeth
Tasmania	St Virgil's College, Hobart	Nano Nagle (St Francis), Hobart
Victoria	Parade College (Bundoora and Preston); St Bernard's College, Essendon; St Joseph's College, Geelong; St Kevin's College, Toorak; St Mary's College, East St Kilda; St Patrick's College, Ballarat	Nano Nagle (St Joseph's), Melbourne and Geelong
Western Australia	Aquinas College, Salter Point; Christian Brothers’ College, Fremantle; Edmund Rice College, Bindoon; Trinity College, East Perth	Oscar Romero (Geraldton and Carnarvon)

=== New Zealand ===
Although not controlled by EREA, there are several partner schools united within the tradition of Edmund Rice:

- Trinity Catholic College, Dunedin
- Liston College, Waitakere
- St Kevin's College, Oamaru
- St Peter's College, Auckland
- St Thomas of Canterbury College, Christchurch

=== Papua New Guinea ===
- Fatima College, Banz, Western Highlands Province
- St Francis Xavier Post Primary School, Bundralis, Manus Province

== See also ==
- Catholic education in Australia
- Edmund Ignatius Rice
- Edmund Rice Camps
- Edmund Rice Schools Trust (Ireland)
- List of Christian Brothers schools
