= Musculoskeletal physiology =

Branch of physiology

Musculoskeletal physiology is the branch of physiology which addresses the processes of the musculoskeletal system.

In subclassifying musculoskeletal physiology, MeSH emphasizes the division between "phenomena" and "processes". A distinction can also be made between processes primarily affecting bone, and those primarily affecting muscle.

== See also ==
- Exercise physiology
- Human physiology
