= Ambrose Treacy College =

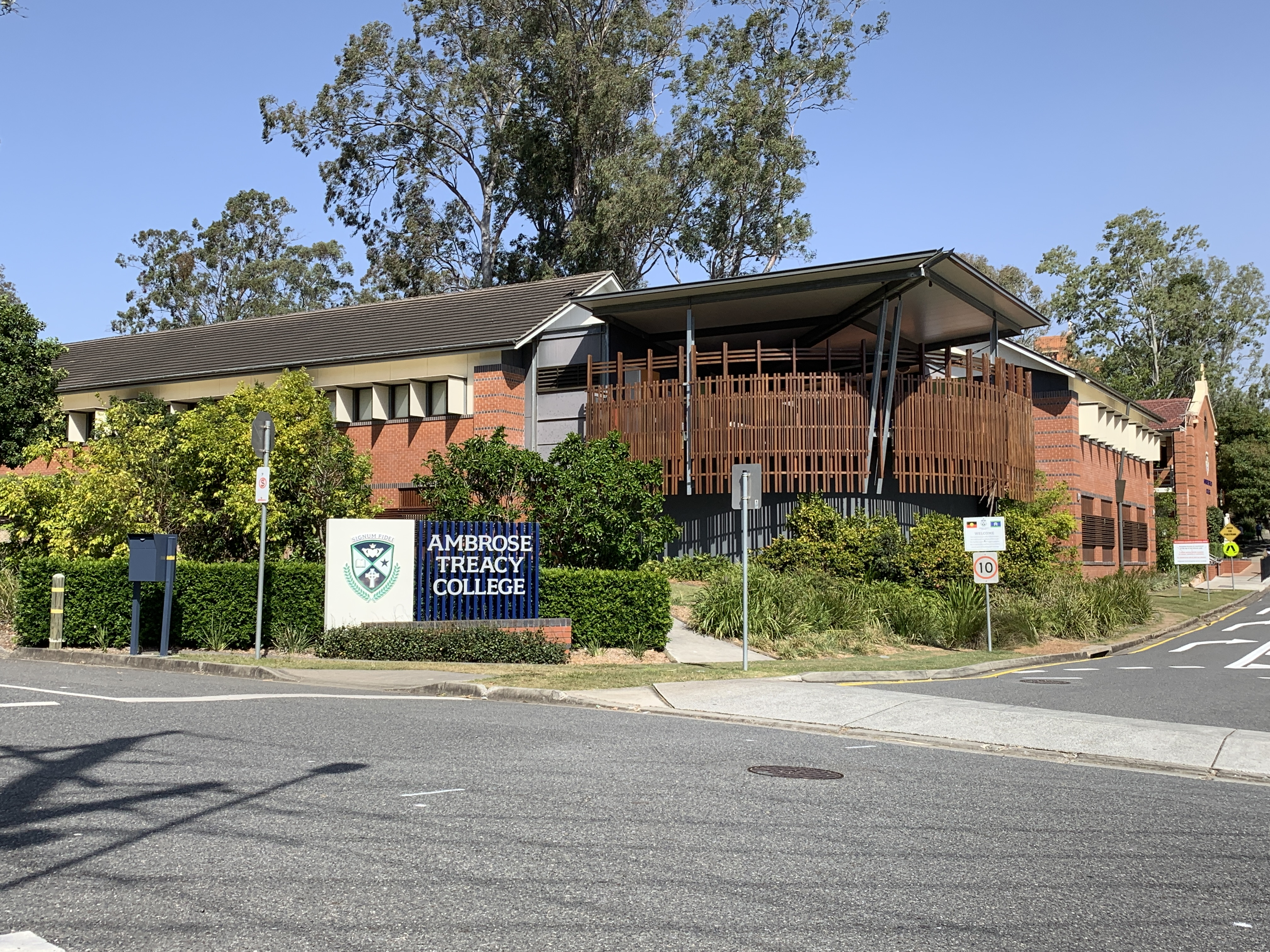
- Ambrose Treacy College, 2019

Location
- Indooroopilly, Queensland, 4068; Australia; 27°30′30″S 152°58′01″E

Information
- Type: Independent primary, secondary, and high school
- Motto: Latin: Signum Fidei (Sign of Faith)
- Religious affiliation: Catholicism
- Denomination: Congregation of Christian Brothers
- Established: 10 July 1938; 88 years ago as Nudgee Junior College, 28 January 2015; 11 years ago as Ambrose Treacy College
- Trust: Edmund Rice Education Australia
- Principal: Dr. Craig Wattam
- Years offered: 4 to 12
- Gender: Male
- Colours: Blue, White, and Green
- Slogan: Learning today, Leading tomorrow
- Nickname: ATC
- Website: www.atc.qld.edu.au

Ambrose Treacy College (ATC) is an independent Catholic primary, secondary, and high school for boys, located in Indooroopilly, Brisbane, Queensland, Australia. Founded by the Congregation of Christian Brothers in 1938 as Nudgee Junior College, the school was initially a boarding college, but became a day school in 1995. The school is a member of Edmund Rice Education Australia association.

== History ==
=== History of the former Nudgee Junior College ===
During the Second World War, the school (then Nudgee Junior), was occupied and converted into the 172nd Station Hospital (USA) from 1941 to 1943 and behind the main building the Section D – the Far Eastern Liaison Office (FELO) or Military Propaganda Section of Allied Intelligence Bureau (AIB) was established. During these 2 years of military occupation, "the 5 Christian Brothers and 100 boys of the college lived and carried out their school duties in a hotel, 2 houses and a hut at Mount Tamborine". The school's motorboat was destroyed during this period as a result of a party, as it was set alight by US personnel. Areas created during this occupation, e.g., a morgue, have been converted into rooms for school use with the morgue in question being transformed into an IT consultancy office for staff and students. This office was destroyed by the 2022 floods, but has since been restored to working condition.

=== History of Ambrose Treacy College ===
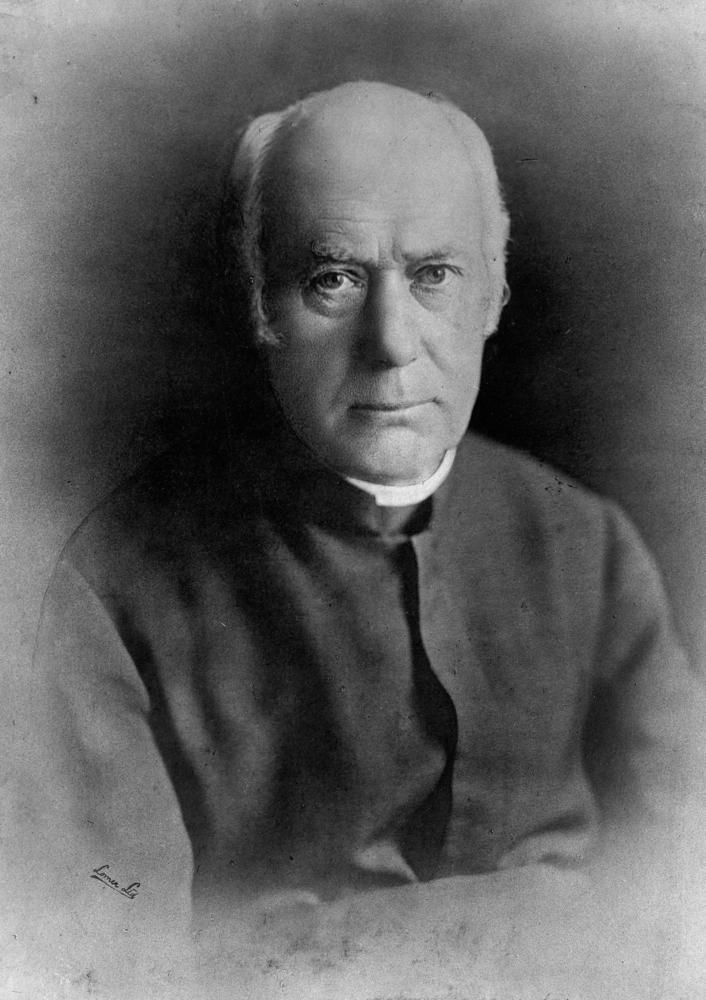
Patrick Ambrose Treacy

The school was established on 28 January 2015 as Ambrose Treacy College (named after Patrick Ambrose Treacy, a leading educator within the Christian Brothers who established many church schools in Australia) replacing the former Nudgee Junior College (the junior school for St Joseph's College, Nudgee). Treacy's legacy, along with the Christian brothers that accompanied him, has since become an integral part of the school's culture along with its Irish heritage leading to the 4 provinces of Ireland becoming the school's house system. Homerooms in the senior school are each named after provinces in Ireland with Leinster house having Leinster provinces, Ulster with Ulster provinces, etc. The school's Christian message has also influenced the school and each year the school grades embark on student retreats.

During the 2022 Brisbane flood, the school was inundated with water and the year 4 classrooms (which had also been destroyed by flooding in the 2011 floods) were once again flooded and severely damaged. The site also lost power. Multiple portable rooms were set up on site to account for these damages, and before power was restored, a large portable generator on site supplied the school with power.

== School structure ==
The school teaches boys from years 4 to 12 and follows the Edmund Rice Tradition. The school is split up into three categories: years 4 to 6 are in the Junior School, years 7 to 9 are in the Middle School and Years 10 to 12 are in the Senior School. The current principal is Dr Craig Wattam. The former principal of Ambrose Treacy College is Chris Ryan, Ryan retired from his post as principal in 2025.

=== Student leadership ===
The school maintains a student leadership team of a School Captain and two vice captains. Additionally, there are two captains for each of the following leadership portfolios: Faith and mission, Academics, and wellbeing, and one for each of sport and music. The two college vice captains may take one of these portfolios each. For each of the four houses, two house captains are elected by their peers in year 11. Each of these captains serve from term four in the year of their election (year 11) to term four of the subsequent year (year 12).

== Buildings ==
The Edmund Rice building (containing the main reception and chapel) was built in 1938 to provide additional boarding accommodation for St Joseph's College at Nudgee. It was officially opened and blessed on 10 July 1938 by the then Roman Catholic Archbishop of Brisbane, James Duhig. In 1994, all of the boarding was relocated to the Nudgee site and the Indooroopilly site became a day school for junior students. It is listed on the Brisbane Heritage Register as it is an excellent example of Interwar Functionalist architecture with its simple geometric volumes, asymmetrical massing and distinctive Modernist windows. Since 2013, the number of buildings have increased with multiple blocks of classrooms and facilities being built, catering to the middle and senior school primarily. Libraries and sports facilities have also been added.

These other buildings include the Nudgee Junior Hall (reference to the school's original name), Mount Sion, Callan, Kilkenny, Tipperary, Westcourt and Waterford which are all references to the different places that Edumund Rice had a significant role in his history.

== House system ==
As an acknowledgement of its Irish Heritage the four Houses of Ambrose Treacy College are named after the four provinces of Ireland: Connacht (green), Leinster (blue), Munster (red) and Ulster (yellow). Each house is directly represented by a mascot and crest. Connacht, inspired by the values of Saint Brendan, Leinster, symbolised by the leadership of the Giant, Fionmac Cumhaill, Munster represented by the image of the High King Brian Boru and Ulster by the rebel Cú Chulainn.This system allows for an interactive teaching of Ireland's rich history, whilst involving all boys from grades 4 to 12 in regular inter-house and house championship competitions. These competitions take many forms, from sports carnivals to chess tournaments. The Houses also regularly compete internally against each other in individual and team sports such as through inter house challenges.

== School culture ==
Students of the college are encouraged to follow a group of values known at the school as the Pillars. These are Service (depicted with a celtic cross), Learning (depicted with an open book), and Leadership (depicted with a star).

The School has a mascot called "Eamonn".

== Co-curricular activities ==
=== Sports ===
The school runs many sporting opportunities, and the school completes in interschool competitions. The school maintains multiple teams that play Australian rules football, soccer, basketball, tennis, water polo, cricket, volleyball, and swimming, amongst others.

==== AFL Team Achievements ====
===== Junior Male (Years 7–9) =====
- AFL Queensland Schools Cup

(silver) Runners Up: 2021

==== Esports ====
The school has an esports program that maintains Rainbow Six Siege, Fortnite, and Rocket League teams; however, the number and game specialisation of these teams change often.

=== Clubs ===
The school maintains a Model United Nations Club, a "Dungeons and Dragons club", Warhammer 40K club, a debating program, and many other cultural activities.

=== Music ===
The school has many musical pathways; these range from private lessons available during school hours to musical ensembles. Once per year the school hosts a "Night of excellence" where students that have achieved certain goals receive awards; Throughout the night the ensembles play a variety of music practised prior to the event. These ensembles often perform at competitions, most commonly QCMF and QYMA.

== Notable alumni ==
- Ezra Mam
- Julian Wruck
