= Neil Betts =

- Born: Terence Neil Betts; 13 April 1926 Brisbane, Queensland, Australia
- Died: 4 February 2017 (aged 90) Brisbane, Queensland, Australia
- Height: 1.80 m (5 ft 11 in)
- School: St Laurence's College

Rugby union career
- Position: Prop
Senior career
Years	Team	Apps	(Points)
1948–58	Souths	174	(174)
1948–56	Queensland	46	(46)
International career
Years	Team	Apps	(Points)
1949–54	Australia	7	(7)

Terence Neil "Tiny" Betts OAM (13 April 1926 – 4 February 2017) was an Australian rugby union player who played for Queensland and the national team.

He was awarded the Medal of the Order of Australia in 2009, for service to rugby union football as a player, administrator and coach.
