= Queensland Catholic Schools & Colleges Music Festival =

- Abbreviation: QCMF
- Formation: 1991
- Headquarters: Queensland, Australia
- Official language: English
- Website: qcmf.com.au

Queensland Catholic Schools & Colleges Music Festival (QCMF) is an annual music event held at Villanova College and St. James Catholic Parish, Coorparoo, Queensland, Australia, held on the Thursday night, Friday, Saturday and Sunday immediately after the Wednesday Ekka Public Holiday in August. The festival is a three-and-a-half-day event encompassing the participation of Catholic schools from Queensland aiming for an award of either Gold, Silver or Bronze, judged by leading musicians. Schools from other parts of Australia and New Zealand who are touring Queensland are also welcome to participate in the festival.

To celebrate 20 years of QCMF in 2010, there was a 20th anniversary concert on Sunday, 15 August with James Morrison, Emma Pask and selected musicians held at QPAC

This event was previously known as the QCCMF (Queensland Catholic Colleges Music Festival).

== History ==
The Queensland Catholic Schools' & Colleges' Music Festival has had an exciting history since its creation in 1991. At that time a number of staff from Villanova College, Coorparoo, who had developed their own school's comprehensive instrumental music programme, were lamenting the lack of opportunities for ensembles from Catholic schools. Opportunities for Catholic schools to perform, to come together, to listen to one another and to get good positive feedback from professional adjudicators were few indeed. Armed with these goals and good doses of enthusiasm and perseverance the QCMF was born.

The past 22 years of history has seen this festival grow from a humble start in 1991 with 12 local Catholic schools, gathering together to recognise great achievements in Catholic Music Education. That message has not changed, although the scope and breadth of this event surely has. In 2011 it welcomed over 11,300 student performances, by 361 ensembles representing 93 Catholic schools from across Queensland, and interstate. In 2012, the numbers have grown to over 12,400 student performances, by 427 ensembles representing 104 Catholic schools.

A distinguishing characteristic of this festival is that it aims to be positive and non-competitive, while still providing recognition to outstanding performances. Every performing ensemble will be adjudicated by encouraging music performance experts, sourced locally and from interstate. Directors receive positive and constructive comments on paper, allowing this to be an educational experience for all involved. The use of adjudicated digital audio recordings was discontinued after 2012 - from 2013 onwards, groups receive a recording of their performance with no adjudicator voice-over. The adjudicators for each section have the task of not only providing constructive feedback, but awarding every ensemble with either a gold, silver or bronze rating based purely on whether they feel a performance has been especially refined, moving, inspirational or otherwise significant. There is no ranking or placing within those categories, and each section will have a completely different combination of gold, silver and bronze awards, depending on the adjudicators' impressions.

The important thing to stress is that every performance is a success for all of the reasons that one involves music in one's educational philosophy - the merits of teamwork, overcoming challenge, improving confidence, increasing brain activity and learning how to express a thousand different emotions through the language of music.

== Venues ==
The QCMF currently run seven venues for the festival. The performance venues at Villanova College are the Augustine Centre, Goold Hall, Veritas Building, Tolle Lege (Senior Library), the Quadrangle Stage, and the Junior School Terraces. At St James Catholic Parish, the church and hall are used as performance venues.

== Festival sponsors ==
The QCMF rely on sponsors to make the festival success by supporting over 10,000 student performers and their parents, conductors and teachers from Catholic Schools across Queensland. The current sponsors of the festival are the following.

Silver Sponsors - Queensland Catholic Education Commission

Bronze Sponsors - Brisbane Catholic Education; John Pearcy Audiology Pty Ltd; Ellaways Music;

Supporters - Horizons Education Tours; The Federation of P & F Associations of Catholic Schools Qld.; Brass Music Specialists; Mater Foundation; Queensland Conservatorium; Commonwealth Bank;

== The History of the QCMF acronym ==
The festival first carried the name of The Catholic Colleges' Music Festival (CCMF), as early participants came mostly from established Brisbane Independent Colleges, which had a tradition of music established by their founding religious orders. Within a few years, the growth of the festival and consequently increasing costs, led to a search for sponsorship. This resulted in the Festival reaching a wider audience and being renamed the Queensland Catholic Colleges' Music Festival (QCCMF) as schools from outside the metropolitan area were coming in numbers to take part in the weekend of music. A few years ago the festival the name changed to include the word 'Schools,' to better reflect the name of all participants, thus creating the Queensland Catholic Schools' & Colleges' Music Festival (which would be QCSCMF). Whilst this title now accurately reflects the heavy involvement in the festival of Catholic primary and secondary systemic schools from Brisbane and beyond, the organising committee has decided to spare everyone the confusion and retain the acronym of QCMF as it is known by most!

The QCMF is now a feature event in the annual "Celebrating Catholic Education in Queensland" activities centred on Catholic Education Week in the third week of term 3 each year. It is very rewarding for the organising committee that the festival is enthusiastically supported by both Brisbane Catholic Education and the Queensland Catholic Education Commission. Both organisations are sponsors of the festival.

None of this could have been achieved without leadership from the staff, the music parent support group and the administration of Villanova College, which still organises and hosts the annual festival on behalf of Catholic Education in this state. May the tradition continue, as the students from Catholic schools throughout the state demonstrate increasing levels of participation and improved performances at the festival as the years roll by.

== See also ==
- List of Australian music festivals
