= St Joseph's College, Gregory Terrace =

School in Brisbane, Australia

- School badge

Location
- 285 St Joseph’s Gregory Terrace; Brisbane, Queensland, 4000; Australia; 27°27′26″S 153°1′31″E

Information
- Type: Private primary and secondary, boys’ day school
- Motto: Latin: Servire Deo Sapere ('To serve God is to be wise')
- Religious affiliation: Roman Catholic
- Denomination: Congregation of Christian Brothers
- Established: 1875; 151 years ago
- Trust: Edmund Rice Education Australia
- Principal: Damien Fall
- Staff: 160
- Years offered: 5–12
- Gender: Boys
- Enrolment: ~1900 (Years 5–12)
- Colours: Red and black
- Nickname: Terrace, GT
- Affiliations: Association of Heads of Independent Schools of Australia; Great Public Schools' Association Inc
- Alumni: Gregory Terrace Old Boys
- Website: www.terrace.qld.edu.au

St Joseph's College, Gregory Terrace (colloquially known as Gregory Terrace, Terrace or GT) is a private Catholic primary and secondary day school for boys, located in Spring Hill, an inner suburb of Brisbane, Queensland, Australia. Founded on 5 July 1875 by three Irish Christian Brothers, the college follows the Edmund Rice tradition, and caters for approximately 1,900 students from years 5 to 12.

St Joseph's College is affiliated with the Association of Heads of Independent Schools of Australia (AHISA), and is a founding member of the Great Public Schools' Association Inc (GPS). An alumnus, Hugh Lunn, wrote books about his life at St Joseph's College, Gregory Terrace.

The school was formerly affiliated with the Combined Independent Colleges (CIC).

== History ==
Terrace was founded in 1875 as both a day school and a boarding school. The original colours for the school were Navy Blue and White, adopted from the Congregational Crest of the Christian Brothers. In 1891 the boarding school was moved to Nudgee and in time became what is now Nudgee College, the boarding school adopted colours of Royal Blue and White. The original Gregory Terrace Navy and White rugby jersey was adopted by the Brothers Old Boys Rugby Club upon formation in 1905 and is still worn by them today. The schools both competed in the famous "Butchers' Stripes" in different shades of blue until 1923 when it was suggested by the newly appointed Gregory Terrace Headmaster, Brother Reidy that, even though the Terrace Navy Blue was close to black, one of the schools change their White to Red for easier recognition on the rugby field. At the time the Christian Brothers were changing their Motto and Crest and Brother Reidy decided to change the Terrace colours to Black and Red at the same time the crest changed.

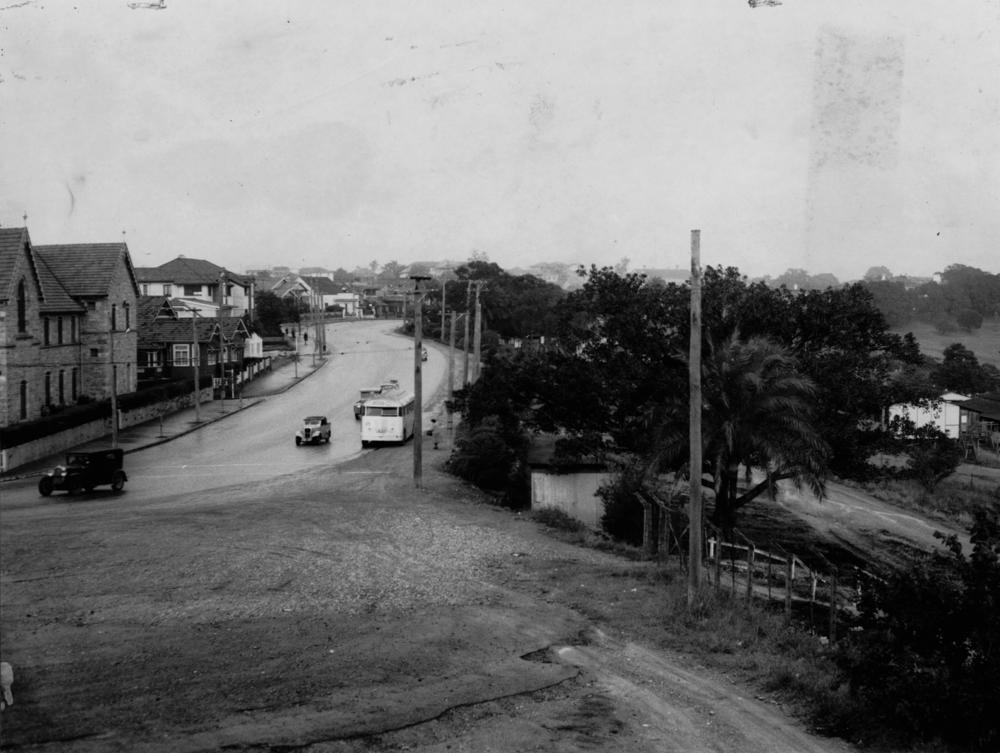
Gregory Terrace, Spring Hill, Brisbane, 1954

=== 2011 Brisbane floods ===
During the January floods, St Joseph's College, Gregory Terrace had their playing fields at Tennyson, inundated with toxic waste and water from the nearby Rocklea Fruit Market. No sports were able to be played at Tennyson during the 2011 school year and a massive refurbishment and rebuild involved the canteen and Boatshed, the iconic Grandstand was destroyed. Soil and turf were removed and completely relaid due to foul nature of the debris. During 2011 Terrace played only one home game, at Brisbane Grammar Schools playing fields at Northgate, which was very kindly lent for the day, all other games were played at the opposing school's facilities.

Tennyson reopened in 2012 and they have completed the building of a new grandstand and player facilities.

== Extracurricular activities ==
=== GPS premierships ===
St Joseph's College's Queensland Great Public Schools (GPS) premierships include:

| Activity | Premiership years |
|---|---|
| Rugby | 1927, 1929, 1956, 1977, 1978, 1979, 1980, 1981, 1996, 2004, |
| Rowing | GPS Premiership (Old Boys Cup) 1997, 2007, 2008, 2009, 1st VIII (O'Connor Cup): 1982, 1994, 1996, 2008 |
| Swimming | 1918, 1919, 1921, 1952, 1953, 1954, 1955, 1957, 1958, 1959, 1970, 1987, 1988, 1989, 1990, 1991, 2024 (jnr), 2025 (jnr), 2026 (jnr) |
| Basketball | 1997, 2000, 2004, 2019 |
| Tennis | 1955, 1992, 1998, 1999, 2002, 2003, 2015 |
| Gymnastics | 1919, 1941, 1942, 1995 |
| Cross country | 2001, 2002, 2003, 2004, 2008, 2010, 2011, 2013, 2014 |
| Football | 2021 |
| Athletics | 1927, 1930, 1934, 1950, 1951 |
| Cricket | 1952, 2004, 2020 |
| Volleyball | 1996, 1997, 2000, 2010, 2014, 2015, 2020, 2021, 2025, 2026 |
| Debating | GPS 1975, 1976, 1981, 1985, 1986, 1989, 1995, 1998, 1999, 2001, 2002, 2005, 2006, 2019, 2023 QDU 1975, 1976, 1977, 1979, 1980, 1981, 1985, 1990, 1995, 1996, 1997, 1998, 1999, 2000, 2002, 2003, 2006, 2010, 2015, 2023 |
| Chess | N/A |

Rugby

Gregory Terrace has produced more Wallabies than any other school in Queensland and second in Australia, with 36 players having represented Australia.

=== Music ===
==== Percussion ====
Gregory Terrace has seen major success with their percussion program over the years with one of the largest achievements, taking out the national title at the Australian Percussion Eistedfodd in 2021. Their drumline also managed to secure 2nd place in the Australian Drumline Competition in the same year, and their drumline previously had placed 3rd in 2019. They are the current reigning champions and seek to retain this position with a back-to-back win and 1st in both percussion and drumline, later this year.

==== QCMF ====
Terrace has a rich history of receiving Gold awards across many ensembles and divisions at the Queensland Catholic Music Festival.

==== SHEP AHEP ====
Each year Terrace also produces multiple talented musicians who participate in many honours ensemble programs both across the state and on a national scale.

== House system ==
There are ten houses at Terrace: Barrett, Buckley, Kearney, Magee, Mahoney, Nagle, Reidy, Treacy, Windsor and Xavier. Originally six, three new houses were introduced at the beginning of the 2009 school year. The tenth house, Nagle, was introduced in 2026.

The nine houses compete in the annual Inter-House competitions (Swimming, Cross Country, House Choir, Track & Field). Points are allocated to each house based on their position. At the end of the year, the house with the most points overall wins the house shield - Currently held by Windsor house.

=== Original houses ===
| Name | Colour | Name origin | House dean |
|---|---|---|---|
| Barrett | Dark blue | Named after James Barrett, the founding headmaster of the College, who arrived in Australia in 1871. | Sam Brown |
| Kearney | Gold | Named after James Kearney who came to Australia in 1911, teaching and serving as headmaster in many schools. He was also the author of the School Song. | Samantha Ackroyd |
| Mahoney | Light blue | Named after the Mahoney Family, including several Rhodes Scholars. | Devon Naeser |
| Reidy | Green | Named after Mark Reidy, who spent 23 years at Terrace, for 16 of which he was headmaster. | Michael Wooldridge |
| Treacy | Orange | Named after Patrick Ambrose Treacy, who in charge of the three Brothers who restarted the mission of the Christian Brothers in Australia in Melbourne in 1868. | Jane Williams |
| Windsor | Grey | Named after the Windsor Family. Henry Windsor, he became an eminent benefactor of Terrace when he arrived in Australia and provided the funds to build the original college pool. | Anthony Hayward |

=== New houses ===
| Name | Colour | Name origin | House dean |
|---|---|---|---|
| Buckley | Dark green | Named after Barry Buckley, Headmaster at Terrace from 1973–1981 and a past student 1951–1952. Br Buckley is highly respected by the community for the significant contribution he made during his time as Headmaster. Br Buckley was made a Member of the Order of Australia in the 2008 Australia Day Honours List for his contribution to education and the church. | James Daniels (Acting) |
| Magee | White | Named after Ted Magee, Headmaster at Terrace from 1990–1992. Although Magee was only Headmaster for three years, during that time he introduced the current House system that has become the hallmark of the community's pastoral care system which supports the students. | Anthony O'Shea |
| Xavier | Purple | Named in acknowledgement of the long history of the St Francis Xavier Province. John Stanislaus Campbell (Headmaster 1959–1964) was the first provincial head of St Francis Xavier Province. | Emma Hatchett |
| Nagle | Maroon | Named in honor of Honora "Nano" Nagle, founder of the Presentation Sisters and whose work inspired Edmund Rice, founder of the Christian Brothers, to start his work. | |

== See also ==
- List of schools in Queensland
- List of Christian Brothers schools
- Catholic education in Australia
