= Padua College (Brisbane) =

Coordinates: 27°24′27″S 153°01′26″E

Padua College, Kedron
- 80 Turner Road, Kedron, Queensland; Australia

Information
- School type: Independent
- Motto: Latin: Deus Meus et Omnia (English: My God and My All)
- Denomination: Roman Catholic
- Established: 1956
- Rector: Bruce McPhee
- Years: 5–12
- Gender: Boys
- Enrolment: 1,462
- Colours: Brown and gold
- Affiliations: Associated Independent Colleges
- Website: www.padua.qld.edu.au

Padua College is an independent Roman Catholic boys' primary and high school located in the Brisbane suburb of Kedron, Queensland, Australia. The college derives its name from Franciscan friar Saint Anthony of Padua (1195–1231), appointed by St Francis as the first professor of theology for the friars. Padua is the university city of Northern Italy where St Anthony died. The College is the only school owned and operated by the Franciscan Friars in Australia and only the second in the Southern Hemisphere along with St Francis of Assisi College in Timor-Leste. Students of the college are known in the community as "Paduans". The college draws students from the central, northern and western areas of Brisbane.

== Sport ==
The college is a member of the Associated Independent Colleges (AIC). Padua College has won the Confraternity Shield numerous times with their last title in 2025. In 2014, Padua College was successful in winning the Bob Linder Trophy.

=== AIC premierships ===
Padua College's Associated Independent Colleges premierships since its inception in 1999 include:

Sport	Premiership years
Rugby	2011, 2015, 2016, 2024, 2025
AFL	2026
Rugby League	2021
Basketball	2009, 2010, 2014
Tennis	2001
Football	1999, 2001
Cricket	2012
Volleyball	2001, 2006, 2016
Chess	2007, 2008, 2015, 2016, 2018
Sport	Runners up
Rugby	1999, 2014, 2019, 2020, 2023
Basketball	2005, 2008, 2011, 2021
Tennis	2003, 2011, 2018, 2019, 2020
Football	2000, 2003, 2008, 2010, 2013
Cricket	2005, 2006, 2009
Volleyball	2003, 2020
Chess	2014

=== Confraternity Shield results ===
The Confraternity Shield is a statewide schoolboy rugby league competition in Queensland that started in 1980. Arguably the biggest and most competitive junior schoolboy rugby league competition in the world with around 50 schools competing each year, Padua College has been one of the most successful schools to compete. Padua College has also a very proud history of producing the most State of Origin players to come from one school. These State of Origin players include Paul Vautin, David Shillington, David Stagg, Dane Carlaw, Paul McCabe and Lindsay Collins.

Shield/trophy	Year of title/trophy
Confraternity Shield	1984, 1997, 2005
Bob Lindner Trophy	2008, 2014, 2015

=== AFL Queensland Schools Cup achievements ===
The AFL Queensland Schools Cup is the premier Australian rules football competition for schools in Queensland, it is run by AFL Queensland.

==== Senior male (years 10–12) ====
- AFL Queensland Schools Cup

(bronze) Third place: 2024

==== Junior male (years 7–9) ====
- AFL Queensland Schools Cup

(bronze) Third place: 2021, 2022, 2024

== Houses ==
“In the College, each boy belongs to one of six Houses: Beirne House (est. 1996), Boyd-Boland House (est. 2013), Grigg House (est. 1996), Kirby House (est. 2013), Mitchell House (est. 1996) and Odoric House (est. 2005). The names of the Houses honour six prominent friar teachers who have taught or are teaching at Padua”.

=== New 2020 Houses ===
In 2019, the College Board made a decision to rename the houses beginning in 2020. The new houses, slogans, and symbols honour the very first followers of St Francis. Angelo House replaced Grigg House, Cattani House replaced Mitchell House, Leo House replaced Kirby House, Masseo House replaced Odoric House, Quintavalle House replaced Boyd-Boland House and Rufino House replaced Beirne House.

=== Friars Cup ===
The Friars Cup is the competition between houses, based on the points earned by the tenants for their house through participation, community service, academic success, etc.

=== Padua Dash ===
The Padua Dash is the annual cross country championship relay race that involves running throughout the Assisi Campus. The fastest runner from each house in each grade participates in an effort to be the fastest house in the relay. Order is sorted by grade so each age group competes at the same leg in the race. The fastest house to run the 1 kilometre course in all age groups is crowned Padua Dash Champions. The most recent champions were the Rufino House who won in 2025.

== Notable alumni ==
=== Sports ===
==== Rugby league ====
- Rohan Ahern (player for the Sydney Roosters)
- David Bouveng (player for the Gold Coast Seagulls, North Queensland Cowboys and Halifax Blue Sox)
- Dane Carlaw (player for the Brisbane Broncos and Catalans Dragons)
- Lindsay Collins (player for the Sydney Roosters)
- Paul McCabe (player for multiple Sydney-based clubs)
- Shane Perry (player for multiple clubs)
- David Shillington (player for the Sydney Roosters, Canberra Raiders and Gold Coast Titans)
- David Stagg (player for the Brisbane Broncos and Canterbury Bulldogs)
- Paul Vautin (commentator and player for Manly Warringah, St Helens and Eastern Suburbs)
- Brad Watts (player for the Melbourne Storm, South Sydney Rabbitohs and Widnes Vikings)

==== Australian rules football ====
- Jacob Allison (player for the Brisbane Lions)
- Harris Andrews (player for the Brisbane Lions)
- Oskar Baker (player for Melbourne and the Western Bulldogs)
- Tony Bamford (player for Port Adelaide in the SANFL)
- Will Martyn (player for Richmond)

==== Rugby union ====
- Dominic Maguire (player for the Queensland Reds and Wallaby number 677)
- Hudson Creighton (player for the Queensland Reds and ACT Brumbies)
- Lawson Creighton (player for the Queensland Reds)
- Tom O'Toole (player for Ulster and the Ireland national team)
- Michael Wood (player for the Queensland Reds and New South Wales Waratahs)

==== Other ====
- Peter Dale (swimmer at the 1984 Summer Olympics)
- Peter Nowill (long-distance runner at the 2004 Summer Olympics)
- Jamie Young (soccer goalkeeper, notably for Aldershot Town and Brisbane Roar)

=== Entertainment and media ===
- Damien Garvey (film and television actor)
- Daniel Gaudiello (ballet dancer)
- Chris Mitchell (journalist and editor-in-chief of The Australian)
- Marty O'Brien and Danny Procopis (musicians and members of rock band Small Mercies)
- Greg Thomson (journalist)
- John Willsteed (musician and member of rock band The Go-Betweens)
- Declan Taylor (Ballroom dancer placing 7th in Dancing with the stars)
- Jared Taylor (Ballroom dancer)

=== Business ===
- Eddy Groves (businessman and founder of ABC Learning)
- Craig Steven Wright (computer scientist, businessman and alleged Bitcoin creator)

=== Politics ===
- Dan Purdie (politician and state MP for Ninderry)
- Jimmy Sullivan (politician and former state MP for Stafford)
- Luke Richmond (politician and state MP for Stafford)

=== Other ===
- Geoffrey Harding OAM (medical practitioner)
- Anthony Ryan (philanthropist)
