= Iona College Brisbane =

Iona College
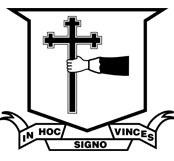

Location
- Brisbane, Queensland; Australia; 27°26′18″S 153°8′55″E

Information
- Type: Independent single-sex day school
- Motto: Latin: In Hoc Signo Vinces (In this sign you will conquer)
- Religious affiliations: Roman Catholic; Oblates of Mary Immaculate
- Established: 1958; 68 years ago
- Rector: Fr Joe Antony OMI
- Principal: Trevor Goodwin
- Years: 5–12
- Gender: Male
- Enrolment: 1,852
- Campus: Wynnum West, Queensland
- Colours: Black and white
- Affiliation: Associated Independent Colleges
- Website: www.iona.qld.edu.au

Iona College is an independent Roman Catholic single-sex day school for boys, located in the Brisbane suburb of Wynnum West, Queensland, Australia. Iona is operated by the Oblates of Mary Immaculate, a religious order that was founded in 1816 by Saint Eugene de Mazenod.

Founded in 1958, the College caters for 1,852 students from years 5 to 12 on a 25-hectare (62-acre) campus approximately 16 kilometres (9.9 mi) east of the Brisbane central business district.

== History ==
On 1 October 1957, Father Tim Long and Father Denis McCarthy arrived on the hill at Lindum in an old second-hand Vauxhall, with only five pounds in cash, a gift of blankets, sheets and towels from the Oblate parish of Eagle Junction and a 'Mass Kit' from the Mercy Sisters at All Hallows School. The site, of 32 acres (13 ha), had been given to the Oblates by Archbishop James Duhig to begin a school for boys. With the help of local residents providing resources to help establish the College, it commenced on 28 January 1958 with 58 students and four staff members.

Iona College's name is taken from the Scottish island of Iona, the birthplace of Celtic Christianity in Scotland.

In 1961, Father Tim Long suffered a heart attack in London while making his way back to Ireland at the age of 65.

In 2015, Michael Twigg O.M.I. was appointed rector of the College.

In 2019, the Board and Oblates appointed Trevor Goodwin as the first principal of Iona.

In 2024, Fr Joe Antony OMI started in the role as college rector, taking over from Fr Michael Twigg OMI.

There are two other schools run by the OMI in Australia: Mazenod College, Victoria and Mazenod College, Western Australia.

== Arms, motto and colours ==
The College colours are black and white. The College crest consists of a shield on which is depicted an arm holding a cross, while underneath is the Latin phrase "In Hoc Signo Vinces", which translates to "In This Sign You Will Conquer".

== Campus ==
The college is situated on 63 hectares and the campus includes such facilities as:

- A performing arts centre (IPAC)
- 4 basketball courts – indoor and outdoor
- Indoor Volleyball courts
- 7 cricket / rugby / soccer / athletics ovals
- An Olympic sized swimming pool
- A fully equipped gymnasium and weights room
- 6 new tennis courts in the Iona Tennis Centre and Barton Family Show Courts
- Industrial Design and Technology Centre
- Art Precinct.
- Indoor Sports Precinct

In total the school has 26 different blocks with a chapel, a staff and priests' house.

Iona College has an outdoor education centre called "Glendalough" near Peregian Beach on the Sunshine Coast. Most year levels visit the camp every year. The site has an area of 19 hectares and Glendalough is close to the southern shores of Lake Weyba, one of the large shallow lakes of the region. Double kayaks are provided for use on the lake. Other nearby activities include climbs of Mt Coolum and Mt Peregian, the environmental walk at Stumer’s Creek Reserve and numerous local patrolled surf beaches.

== Performing Arts Centre and cultural activities ==
The Iona College Performing Arts Centre (IPAC) was opened in 1998, giving the school's cultural activity such as Speech & Drama, Music and Art a venue to display their talents.

Iona has a proud tradition in many cultural activities such as drama, music, art, debating and public speaking, titration and mooting.

Every year The Festival of Music, a statewide competition open to all schools is held in the Iona Performing Arts Center (IPAC). Both state and private schools are allowed to enter this competition. Iona's musical, play and band concerts all are performed here. Music at Iona College maintains a good reputation, such as the Wind Ensemble, Percussion Ensemble and Jazz Band receiving success in their fields of competition.

The school provides over 14 school bands. It can be divided into 6 categories. These include:

- Concert bands (Wind Ensemble, Symphonic Winds, Concert Band, Year 6 Band, Year 5 Band)
- Sympathy Orchestra
- String orchestras
- Vocal ensembles (Iona Singers, Ionian Voices)
- Jazz ensembles (Jazz Ensembles 1, 2 and 3)
- Percussion ensembles (Percussion Ensemble 1, 2 and 3)
- Mass Band
- Sports Band

These categories can be divided into three levels: beginner, intermediate and advanced. The bands use IPAC to perform and practice. The school also provides music lessons for students.

Iona has been very successful in public speaking with various regional, state and national representatives. The Carter Shield is an annual public speaking competition between Moreton Bay College and Iona College. 2006 celebrated the tenth year of this competition and in 2015, Iona College won the Shield for the twelfth time.

== Sport ==
Iona College is a member of the Associated Independent Colleges (AIC). The College offers a variety of sports including: rugby union, soccer, water polo, cricket, Australian rules football, chess, volleyball, tennis, basketball, sailing, swimming, athletics, cross country, touch football, and mountain biking.

=== AIC premierships ===
Iona College has won the following AIC premierships.

- AFL (1) – 2025
- Athletics (9) – 2000, 2001, 2002, 2006, 2007, 2008, 2009, 2010, 2011
- Basketball (5) – 2005, 2007, 2008, 2009, 2010
- Cricket (10) – 1999, 2000, 2004, 2006, 2007, 2012, 2016, 2022, 2024, 2025
- Cross Country (9) – 1999, 2000, 2001, 2006, 2007, 2011, 2015, 2016, 2023
- Chess (1) – 2004
- Rugby (4) – 2000, 2009, 2013, 2018
- Soccer (4) – 2015, 2017, 2018, 2023
- Swimming (2) – 2003, 2004
- Tennis (2) – 2021, 2022
- Volleyball (5) – 2018, 2019, 2024, 2025, 2026
- Rugby League (3) – 2022, 2024, 2025

== Notable alumni ==
Order of Australia recipients

- Ashley Callus OAM – former sprint freestyle swimmer, gold medal winner in the 4 × 100 m freestyle relay at the 2000 Sydney Olympics
- Paul Stevenson OAM – psychologist

Sport

- Tom Bell – former Australian rules footballer
- Wayne Broad – former first-class cricketer
- Mitchell Dodds – former rugby league player
- Shane Drahm – former rugby union player
- Benjamin Goedemans - international swimmer
- Harrison Graham – rugby league player
- Tom Hickey – Australian rules footballer
- Andrew Johns – British triathlete
- Bob Lindner – former rugby league player
- Chris McKenna – former rugby league player
- Max Plath – rugby league player
- Dan Power – Australian-born American former rugby union player and commentator
- Graham Quinn – former rugby league player
- Ed Quirk – rugby union player
- Josh Thomas – former Australian rules footballer
- Patrick Theodore – former professional footballer
- Ben Turner – weightlifter, 69 kg weightlifting gold medal winner at the 2006 Commonwealth Games
- David Tyrrell – former rugby league player
- Jared Waerea-Hargreaves – New Zealand professional rugby league player
- Brad Wilkin – rugby union player

Politics

- Don Brown – MP for Capalaba from 2015 to 2024
- Anthony Lynham – former oral and maxillofacial surgeon, MP for Stafford from 2014 to 2020

Other

- Joe Andon – businessperson, founder and CEO of Vuly Play
- Chris Milligan – actor, known for his role as Kyle Canning in the television soap opera Neighbours
- Fr Brian O’Mahony – Sub-Dean of Westminster Cathedral, London
- Jason Orthman – Lead Portfolio Manager and Executive Director of Hyperion Asset Management – Morningstar Australia Fund Manager of the Year in 2025, 2024, 2021, and 2016.
- Professor Gene Tyson – Professor of Microbiology and Genetics, Founder of Microba
- Thomas Wilson - Renowned Delica enthusiast

== See also ==
- Education in Australia
- Associated Independent Colleges
