= St Laurence's College =

- Gair Field, St Laurence's College, 2010

Location
- 82 Stephens Road; South Brisbane, Queensland, 4101; Australia

Information
- Type: Independent primary and secondary school
- Motto: Latin: Facere et Docere (To do and to teach)
- Religious affiliation: Catholicism
- Denomination: Congregation of Christian Brothers
- Established: 11 July 1915; 111 years ago
- Founder: Congregation of Christian Brothers
- Trust: Edmund Rice Education Australia
- Principal: Ben Lowrie
- Years offered: 5–12
- Gender: Boys
- Enrolment: 1913 (2021)
- Campus: Urban
- Colours: Black and gold
- Affiliation: Associated Independent Colleges
- Website: www.slc.qld.edu.au

St Laurence's College (known colloquially as Lauries) is an independent Catholic primary and secondary school for boys, located in South Brisbane, Queensland, Australia. Founded by the Congregation of Christian Brothers in 1915. the school is a member of Edmund Rice Education Australia. As of 2021, the college had an enrolment of over 1913 students from Year 5 to Year 12. St Laurence's is affiliated with the Associated Independent Colleges sporting association.

Some of the college's historic buildings are listed on the Brisbane Heritage Register.

== History ==
The present-day site of St Laurence's College has been associated with Catholic education since the 1870s. St Kilian's College occupied the site, known as College Hill or St Kilian's Hill, from 1871 to 1898. It was established by Bishop James Quinn as a boys' boarding school and "pre-seminary". It was partly destroyed by a fire in 1898 and replaced with a primary school, which closed in 1904 after a severe summer storm.

St Laurence's College was officially opened and blessed on 11 July 1915 by the Archbishop of Brisbane James Duhig. The school has been operated by the Christian Brothers since its inception. On the first day there were 270 students and a staff of five teachers. The monastery for the Brothers was built in 1917.

Since 1961, the school has also operated sporting fields in the southern Brisbane suburb of Runcorn, which contains eight playing fields and a function centre. In 1977 the school established an outdoor educational facility, Camp Laurence, at Lake Moogerah, to the west of Brisbane.

In 1994 a College Board was established as an advisory group for the principal. In 1996 the first lay principal, Mr D Frederiksen, was appointed with the Christian Brothers retaining ownership and control of the College. The last of the brothers left the monastery in 2009, and the building was converted in 2010 into the school's administration building.

In 2010, as part of an agreement with the adjacent Mater Hospital Brisbane, the school's land was leased for 25 years to build a six-storey car park, which now houses the college's synthetic oval on top along with a 1500 seat auditorium.

== Sport ==
St Laurence's College is a member of the Associated Independent Colleges (AIC).

== Notable alumni ==
Alumni of St Laurence's College are known as "Old Boys" and may elect to join the school's alumni association, the St Laurence's College Old Boys Association. Notable alumni include:

=== Business ===
- John Symond AM – founder of Aussie Home Loans

=== Entertainment, arts and the media ===
- Tim Allen-Ankins – associate principal french horn of the Queensland Symphony Orchestra
- Jon Copley – musician, music manager and tour manager
- Matthew Copley – musician, music producer, and vice president of ATLED Records
- Murray Foy – actor and theatre director
- Gerard Lee – Australian novelist, screenwriter and director
- Matthew Newsome – media composer, orchestrator and conductor
- Daniel O'Brien – film and television composer and studio manager for Joff Bush
- Kerry O'Brien – television news journalist and presenter
- Samuel Piper – baritone soloist and chorister in opera, oratorio, song, and chamber music
- Conrad Sewell – Australian singer-songwriter
- Ross Symonds – former news presenter for Seven Network in Sydney
- Dominic Woodhead – musical director, conductor and composer

=== Politics, law and public service ===
- Darryl Briskey – former state Labor member for Cleveland
- Condon Byrne – former federal Labor Senator for Queensland
- Paul Finn – Judge of the Federal Court of Australia
- Mike Horan – former state National member for Toowoomba South and Leader of the Opposition
- Dennis Ives – former Public Service Commissioner 1990–1995
- Len Keogh – former federal Labor member for the Division of Bowman
- John Mickel – former state Labor member for Logan and Speaker of the Legislative Assembly of Queensland
- Jeffrey Spender – Judge of the Federal Court of Australia and Queen's Counsel

=== Sports ===
- John Anderson OAM – Olympic sailor; gold medalist at the 1972 Olympics
- Thomas Anderson – Olympic sailor; gold medalist at the 1972 Olympics
- Neil Betts OAM – rugby union player for the Wallabies
- Brendan Cannon – rugby union player for the Wallabies and Queensland Reds
- Mark Connors – rugby union player for the Wallabies and Queensland Reds
- Nev Cottrell – rugby union player for the Wallabies and Queensland Reds
- Cooper Cronk – rugby league player for Melbourne Storm, Sydney Roosters, Queensland Maroons, and the Kangaroos
- Rhys Jacks – rugby league player - Canada
- Rowan Crothers OAM – Paralympic swimmer
- Dan Crowley – rugby union player for the Wallabies and Queensland Reds
- Ken Fletcher – tennis player and winner of 12 Grand Slam titles
- Greg Hartung AO – President of the Australian Paralympic Committee and Vice-President of the International Paralympic Committee
- Brian Harvey OAM – Paralympic track & field athlete - Gold medalist javelin
- Ryley Jacks – rugby league player for the Gold Coast Titans
- Damon Kelly – Olympic weightlifter and Commonwealth Games gold medalist
- Laurie Lawrence – rugby union player for the Wallabies and coach of the Australian Olympic swimming team
- Luke McLean – rugby union player for Italy and Sale Sharks
- Andrew Mewing – swimmer and medalist in the World Championships and Commonwealth Games
- Brendan O'Reilly – UFC mixed martial artist
- Harry Sharp – Australian rules football player
- Elliott Shriane – Olympic speed skater
- Joshua Slack – Olympic beach volleyball player
- Archie Smith – Australian rules football player for the Brisbane Lions
- Mark Stockwell – Olympic swimming silver medalist at the 1984 Olympics; chairman of the Australian Sports Foundation
- William Zillman – Professional rugby league player

== Controversies ==
=== July 2008 attack on students ===
On 28 July 2008, a group of youths armed with a meat cleaver and a steel bar stormed St Laurence's School campus in South Brisbane and attacked two 15-year-old boys. One student was slashed across the face and had to undergo surgery. Another suffered deep cuts to his lower back. Seven individuals, aged between thirteen and eighteen, were charged over the attacks.

=== Sexual assault ===
The college has a history of sexual assaults. At a candlelight mass in 2015 hosted by Ian McDonald, St Laurence's previous principal, he apologised for the sexual assaults, saying that they "must never happen again". In April 1984, former Christian Brother Brian Dennis Cairns was charged with sexual assault offences against twelve male pupils, aged from ten to twelve years, a number of which attended St Laurence's. Cairns was jailed in 1985 and again in 2014 after more victims came forward.

== See also ==
- Catholic education in Australia
- List of schools in Queensland
