= The Associated Schools =

Group of schools in Queensland, Australia

- Formation: 1956
- Headquarters: Brisbane, Queensland
- Members: 14 schools
- Official language: English
- Website: theassociatedschools.com.au

The Associated Schools (TAS) is an incorporated body involving fourteen co-educational independent Queensland secondary schools in a variety of sporting and cultural activities established in 1956 following the disbanded Metropolitan Secondary School Sports Association in 1955, which had been established in 1950.

== Schools ==
The member schools currently participate in one of two competition divisions; The Associated Schools, and the Greater Brisbane Conference.

Member school	Location	Enrolment	Year founded	Denomination	Gender(s)	Day/ boarding	Entered competition	School colours
The Associated Schools
Cannon Hill Anglican College	Cannon Hill	1,230	1989	Anglican	Boys & Girls	Day	2000	Red, royal blue and white
Canterbury College	Waterford	1,252	1987	Anglican	Boys & Girls	Day	1991	Red, navy blue and white
St John's Anglican College	Forest Lake	1,000	1994	Anglican	Boys & Girls	Day	2000	Red, navy blue and white
John Paul College	Daisy Hill	1,634	1982	Ecumenical	Boys & Girls	Day & Boarding	1983	Burgundy & light blue
Ormiston College	Ormiston	1,331	1988	Non-denominational	Boys & Girls	Day	1996	Maroon and light blue
St Columban's College	Caboolture	1,022	1928	Catholic	Boys & Girls	Day	1956	Navy blue and gold
St Paul's School	Bald Hills	1,212	1961	Anglican	Boys & Girls	Day	1962	Cardinal red & bottle green
West Moreton Anglican College	Karrabin	1,395	1993	Anglican	Boys & Girls	Day	2000	Navy blue, rust and gold
Greater Brisbane Conference
Faith Lutheran College, Redlands	Thornlands	698	2000	Lutheran	Boys & Girls	Day	2009	Light blue, navy blue and gold
Faith Lutheran College, Plainland	Plainland	689	2000	Lutheran	Boys & Girls	Day	2009	Light blue, navy blue and gold
Redeemer Lutheran College	Rochedale	1009	1980	Lutheran	Boys & Girls	Day	1983	Sky and royal blue
Rivermount College	Yatala	926	1992	Non-denominational	Boys & Girls	Day	2000	Navy blue, green and gold
Sheldon College	Sheldon	1,021	1997	Non-denominational	Boys & Girls	Day	2016	Navy, sky and white
Springfield Anglican College	Springfield	600	1998	Anglican	Boys & Girls	Day	2004	Red, navy blue and white
Former Member Schools
De La Salle College (Southern Cross Catholic College)	Scarborough	619	1955	Catholic	Boys	Day	1961–1994	Blue, gold, and red
Iona College	Wynnum West	1,300	1958	Catholic	Boys	Day	1985–1998	Black and white
Loreto College	Coorparoo	710	1928	Catholic	Girls	Day	2000–2008	Blue and gold
Marist College Ashgrove	Ashgrove	1,474	1940	Catholic	Boys	Day & Boarding	1956–1998	Blue and gold
Marist College Rosalie (Closed 2008)	Paddington	250	1929	Catholic	Boys	Day	1956–2008	Cerise and blue
Padua College	Kedron	1,200	1956	Catholic	Boys	Day	1994–1998	Brown, grey, white and gold
St Edmund's College	Ipswich	961	1892	Catholic	Boys	Day	1985–1998	Blue & white
St Laurence's College	South Brisbane	1,375	1915	Catholic	Boys	Day	1956–1998	Black and gold
St Patrick's College	Shorncliffe	960	1952	Catholic	Boys	Day	1956–1998	Green and gold
St Peters Lutheran College	Indooroopilly	2,000	1945	Lutheran	Boys & Girls	Day & Boarding	1956–1998	Maroon and white
Stuartholme School	Toowong	705	1920	Catholic	Girls	Day & Boarding	2000–2008	Red, gold and blue
Villanova College	Coorparoo	1,128	1948	Catholic	Boys	Day	1956–1998	Green and gold
The Scots PGC College	Warwick	450	1918	Uniting Church	Boys & Girls	Day & Boarding	2000–2012	Red, green and white

== Sports ==
Apart from the core sports of Swimming, Cross-country and Athletics, all TAS sport is played on Saturdays over 3 trimesters. Each trimester is approximately nine weeks.

	Boys	Girls	Carnival
Trimester 1	Cricket; Volleyball	Basketball; Tennis	Swimming
Trimester 2	Rugby; Tennis	Hockey (Soccer in the GBC competition); Netball	Cross Country
Trimester 3	Basketball; Soccer	Volleyball; Touch Football	Athletics

== Championships ==
=== Swimming ===
Winning teams on aggregate points across all secondary school age groups for both boys and girls from 2000 onwards are listed below. The Associated Schools had blue and red conference divisions for co-educational carnivals from 2000 to 2013, and the higher blue division championship winners are listed for those years:

Year	Winner
2021	Cannon Hill
2020	No champion school^{b}
2019	John Paul
2018	John Paul
2017	John Paul
2016	John Paul
2015	Ormiston
2014	Ormiston

Year	Winner
2013	Ormiston
2012	Ormiston
2011	Ormiston
2010	Ormiston
2009	Ormiston
2008	St Paul's
2007	Ormiston

Year	Winner
2006	St Paul's
2005	St Paul's
2004	St Paul's
2003	St Paul's
2002	St Paul's
2001	St Paul's
2000	St Paul's

Championships, 2000–present: Ormiston (8), St Paul's (8), John Paul (4).

Boys' swimming

Winning teams on aggregate points for all secondary school age groups from 1956 onwards are listed below. The Associated Schools had blue and red conference divisions for boys swimming from 1986 to 2013, and the higher blue division championship winners are listed for those years:

Year	Winner
2020	No champion school^{b}
2019	John Paul
2018	John Paul
2017	John Paul
2016	John Paul
2015	Ormiston
2014	Ormiston
2013	Ormiston
2012	Ormiston
2011	Ormiston
2010	Ormiston
2009	Ormiston
2008	Ormiston
2007	St Paul's
2006	St Paul's
2005	Ormiston
2004	St Paul's
2003	St Paul's
2002	Ormiston
2001	St Paul's
2000	St Paul's

Year	Winner
1999	St Paul's
1998	St Peter's
1997	St Peter's
1996	Iona
1995	Iona
1994	Iona
1993	Iona
1992	Ashgrove
1991	Ashgrove
1990	Ashgrove
1989	Ashgrove
1988	Ashgrove
1987	Ashgrove
1986	St Laurence's
1985	De La Salle
1984	St Paul's
1983	St Columban's
1982	St Paul's
1981	St Paul's
1980	St Paul's
1979	Ashgrove
1978	St Columban's

Year	Winner
1977	St Columban's
1976	St Paul's
1975	St Laurence's
1974	De La Salle
1973	St Laurence's
1972	St Laurence's
1971	St Laurence's
1970	St Laurence's
1969	St Laurence's
1968	St Laurence's
1967	St Laurence's
1966	St Laurence's
1965	St Laurence's
1964	St Laurence's
1963	St Laurence's
1962	St Laurence's
1961	St Laurence's
1960	St Laurence's
1959	St Laurence's
1958	St Laurence's
1957	St Laurence's
1956	St Laurence's

Championships:

- 1999–present: Ormiston (10), St Paul's (7), John Paul (4).
- 1956–1998: St Laurence's (20), Ashgrove (7), St Paul's (5), Iona (4), St Columban's (3), De La Salle (2),

Girls' swimming

Winning teams on aggregate points for all secondary school age groups for The Associated Schools (2000 onwards) and the Independent Schools Association (1988–1999) are listed below. The Associated Schools had blue and red conference divisions for girls swimming from 2000 to 2013, and the higher blue division championship winners are listed for those years:

Year	Winner
2020	No champion school^{b}
2019	John Paul
2018	John Paul
2017	West Moreton
2016	John Paul
2015	Ormiston
2014	Ormiston
2013	Ormiston
2012	Ormiston
2011	Ormiston
2010	Ormiston

Year	Winner
2009	St Columban's
2008	Loreto
2007	Loreto
2006	Loreto
2005	St Paul's
2004	Loreto
2003	Stuartholme
2002	Stuartholme
2001	Loreto
2000	Loreto
1999	Loreto

Year	Winner
1998	Loreto
1997	Loreto
1996	Loreto
1995	St Peter's
1994	Loreto
1993	St Peter's
1992	St Peter's
1991	Loreto
1990	St Peter's
1999	St Peter's
1988	St Peter's

Championships:

- 2000–present: Loreto (6), Ormiston (6), John Paul (3), Stuartholme (2), St Columban's (1), St Paul's (1), West Moreton (1).
- ISA, 1988–1999: Loreto (6), St Peters (6).

=== Athletics (track and field) ===
Winning teams on aggregate points across all secondary school age groups for both boys and girls from 2000 onwards are listed below. The Associated Schools had blue and red conference divisions for co-educational carnivals from 2000 to 2013, and the higher blue division championship winners are listed for those years:

Year	Winner
2020	No champion school^{b}
2019	Canterbury
2018	John Paul
2017	John Paul
2016	Canterbury
2015	St Columban's
2014	St Columban's

Year	Winner
2013	John Paul
2012	
2011	
2010	Ormiston
2009	John Paul
2008	John Paul
2007	John Paul

Year	Winner
2006	John Paul
2005	John Paul
2004	John Paul
2003	John Paul
2002	John Paul
2001	John Paul
2000	John Paul

Championships, 2000–present: John Paul (13), Canterbury (2), St Columban's College (2), Ormiston (1).

Boys' athletics

Winning teams on aggregate points for all secondary school age groups from 1956 onwards are listed below. The Associated Schools had blue and red conference divisions for boys track and field from 1985 to 2013, and the higher blue division championship winners are listed for those years:

Year	Winner
2020	No champion school^{b}
2019	John Paul
2018	John Paul
2017	John Paul
2016	St Columban's
2015	St Columban's
2014	St Columban's
2013	Ormiston
2012	
2011	
2010	John Paul
2009	
2008	
2007	St Columban's
2006	St Columban's
2005	John Paul
2004	West Moreton
2003	Ormiston
2002	John Paul
2001	John Paul
2000	John Paul

Year	Winner
1999	John Paul
1998	Iona
1997	Ashgrove
1996	Iona
1995	Iona
1994	Ashgrove
1993	Ashgrove
1992	Ashgrove
1991	St Laurence's
1990	St Peter's
1989	Ashgrove
1988	Ashgrove
1987	Ashgrove
1986	Ashgrove
1985	Ashgrove
1984	Ashgrove
1983	St Laurence's
1982	Ashgrove
1981	Ashgrove
1980	Ashgrove
1979	Ashgrove
1978	Ashgrove

Year	Winner
1977	St Columban's
1976	Ashgrove
1975	St Laurence's
1974	Ashgrove
1973	Ashgrove
1972	St Laurence's
1971	Ashgrove
1970	St Peter's
1969	Villanova
1968	Ashgrove
1967	Villanova
1966	St Peter's
1965	St Peter's
1964	St Laurence's
1963	St Laurence's
1962	Ashgrove
1961	St Laurence's
1960	St Laurence's
1959	St Laurence's
1958	St Laurence's
1957	St Laurence's
1956	St Laurence's

Championships:

- 1999–present: John Paul (9), St Columban's (5), Ormiston (2), West Moreton (1).
- 1956–1998: Ashgrove (21), St Laurence's (12), St Peters (4), Iona (3), Villanova (2), St Columban's (1).

Girls' athletics

Winning teams on aggregate points for all secondary school age groups from 2000 onwards are listed below. The Associated Schools had blue and red conference divisions for girls track and field from 2000 to 2013, and the higher blue division championship winners are listed for those years:

Year	Winner
2020	No champion school^{b}
2019	Canterbury
2018	
2017	Canterbury
2016	Canterbury
2015	
2014	West Moreton

Year	Winner
2013	St Columban's
2012	
2011	
2010	
2009	
2008	
2007	

Year	Winner
2006	
2005	
2004	
2003	
2002	
2001	
2000	

Championships, 2000–present: Canterbury (3), St Columban's (1), West Moreton (1).

== Boys' premierships ==
=== First XV Rugby ===
List of First XV premiers since 1956 are listed below. The Associated Schools had blue and red conference divisions from 1985 to 2013, and the higher blue division premiership winners are listed for those years:

Year	Winner
2022	Ormiston
2021	St Columban's
2020	No premiership^{b}
2019	St Columban's
2018	Ormiston
2017	St Paul's
2016	John Paul
2015†	John Paul • St Columban's
2014	St Columban's
2013	St Columban's
2012	St Columban's
2011	John Paul
2010	John Paul
2009	John Paul
2008	Ormiston
2007	John Paul
2006	John Paul
2005	Ormiston
2004	John Paul
2003	St Paul's
2002	Ormiston
2001†	Rosalie • St Columban's
2000†	Ormiston • Scots PGC

Year	Winner
1999	No premiership
1998	Ashgrove
1997	Ashgrove
1996	St Peter's
1995	St Laurence's
1994	Iona
1993	St Laurence's
1992	Ashgrove
1991	St Laurence's
1990	St Laurence's
1989	Ashgrove
1988	St Laurence's
1987	St Laurence's
1986	St Peter's
1985	St Laurence's
1984	Ashgrove
1983	Ashgrove
1982	Ashgrove
1981	Ashgrove
1980	De La Salle
1979	Ashgrove
1978	Ashgrove

Year	Winner
1977	St Columban's
1976	Ashgrove
1975	Ashgrove
1974†	Ashgrove • Villanova
1973	Villanova
1972	Ashgrove
1971	Villanova
1970	De La Salle
1969†	Ashgrove • St Peter's • Villanova
1968†	Ashgrove • De La Salle • St Peter's
1967	St Laurence's • Villanova
1966	Ashgrove
1965	Ashgrove
1964	St Peter's
1963	St Peter's
1962	St Peter's
1961	Ashgrove
1960	Ashgrove
1959	Ashgrove
1958†	Ashgrove • St Laurence's
1957	Ashgrove
1956	Ashgrove

Premierships:

- 2000–present: John Paul (7), Ormiston (7), St Columban's (7), St Paul's (2), Rosalie (1), Scots PGC (1).
- 1956–1998: Ashgrove (24), St Laurence's (9), St Peters (7), Villanova (5), De La Salle (3), Iona (1), St Columban's (1).

† indicates shared premiership for the year.

=== First VI Volleyball ===
List of First VI premiers since 1956 are listed below. The Associated Schools had blue and red conference divisions from 1985 to 2013, and the higher blue division premiership winners are listed for those years:

Year	Winner
2021	Canterbury
2020	St Pauls's (Final's not played)
2019	St Paul's
2018	St Paul's
2017	Ormiston
2016	Ormiston
2015	Ormiston
2014	Cannon Hill
2013	Cannon Hill
2012	
2011	Ormiston
2010	Ormiston
2009	St Paul's
2008	St Paul's
2007	Ormiston
2006	St Paul's
2005	Ormiston
2004	Ormiston
2003	John Paul
2002	John Paul
2001	Canterbury
2000	Canterbury

Year	Winner
1999	Villanova
1998	Villanova
1997	Villanova
1996	St Columban's
1995	Redeemer
1994	Villanova
1993	Villanova
1992	Villanova
1991†	St Paul's • Villnova
1990	Iona
1989	St Peters's
1988	St Columban's
1987	St Columban's
1986	St Columban's

Premierships:

- 2000–present: Ormiston (8), St Paul's (6), Canterbury (2), John Paul (2), Cannon Hill (2),.
- 1986–1999: Iona (1), St Paul's (1), St Columban's (4), St Peters (1), Villanova (7), Redeemer (1).

† indicates shared premiership for the year.

=== First XI Football ===
List of First XI premiers since 1956 are listed below. The Associated Schools had blue and red conference divisions from 1985 to 2013, and the higher blue division premiership winners are listed for those years:

Year	Winner
2022	West Moreton
2021	Cannon Hill (Final's not played)
2020	No premiership^{b}
2019	Ormiston
2018	St Paul's
2017	John Paul
2016	St Paul's
2015	John Paul
2014	John Paul
2013	John Paul
2012	John Paul
2011	John Paul
2010	Canterbury
2009	John Paul
2008	John Paul
2007	St Paul's
2006	John Paul
2005	John Paul
2004	John Paul
2003	John Paul
2002	John Paul
2001†	St Paul's • Rosalie
2000	John Paul

Year	Winner
1999	Rosalie
1998	Padua
1997	John Paul
1996	St Paul's
1995	John Paul
1994	Ashgrove
1993	St Paul's
1992†	St Paul's • Villnova
1991	Ashgrove
1990	St Laurence's
1989	Ashgrove

Premierships:

- 2000–present: John Paul (14), St Paul's (4), Canterbury (1), Cannon Hill (1), Ormiston (1), West Moreton (1).
- 1986–1999: St Paul's (3), Ashgrove (3), John Paul (2), Villanova (1), Rosalie (1), St Laurence's (1), Padua (1).

† indicates shared premiership for the year.

=== First XI Cricket ===
List of First XI premiers since 1956 are listed below. The Associated Schools had blue and red conference divisions from 1985 to 2013, and the higher blue division premiership winners are listed for those years:

Year	Winner
2020	West Moreton
2019	West Moreton
2018	Ormiston
2017	John Paul
2016†	John Paul • Ormiston
2015	John Paul
2014	John Paul
2013	John Paul
2012	John Paul
2011	St Columban's
2010	John Paul
2009	John Paul
2008	St Columban's
2007	Ormiston
2006	Ormiston
2005	Ormiston
2004†	Redeemer • St Paul's
2003	John Paul
2002	John Paul
2001	St Paul's
2000	Canterbury

Year	Winner
1999	No premiership
1998	Iona
1997	John Paul
1996	Ashgrove
1995	Ashgrove
1994	Ashgrove
1993	St Paul's
1992	St Laurence's
1991	St Peter's
1990	St Edmund's
1989	Iona
1988	Iona
1987	Ashgrove
1986	De La Salle
1985	Ashgrove
1984	St Laurence's
1983	St Columban's
1982	Ashgrove
1981	St Laurence's
1980	Ashgrove
1979	Ashgrove
1978	Ashgrove

Year	Winner
1977	Ashgrove
1976	Ashgrove
1975	St Paul's
1974	Villanova
1973	Ashgrove
1972	St Paul's
1971	abandoned
1970	Rosalie
1969	Rosalie
1968	Rosalie
1967	Ashgrove
1966	St Laurence's
1965	Ashgrove
1964	Ashgrove
1963	St Colomban's
1962	St Laurence's
1961	Rosalie
1960	Rosalie
1959	Ashgrove
1958	Ashgrove
1957	Ashgrove
1956	Rosalie

Premierships:

- 2000–present: John Paul (10), Ormiston (5), St Columban's (2), St Paul's (3), West Moreton (2), Canterbury (1), Redeemer (1).
- 1956–1998: Ashgrove (18), Rosalie (6), St Laurence's (5), Iona (3), St Paul's (3), St Columban's (2), De La Salle (1), John Paul (1), St Edmund's (1), St Peters (1), Villanova (1).

== Girls' premierships ==
=== First XI Hockey ===
List of First XI premiers since 2000 are listed below. The Associated Schools had blue and red conference divisions from 2000 to 2013, and the higher blue division premiership winners are listed for those years:

Year	Winner
2020	No premiership^{b}
2019	West Moreton
2018	Ormiston
2017	West Moreton
2016†	Canterbury • West Moreton
2015	St Paul's
2014	Ormiston

Year	Winner
2013	Ormiston
2012	John Paul
2011	Cannon Hill
2010	Cannon Hill
2009	Cannon Hill
2008	Loreto • Ormiston
2007	Loreto • Ormiston

Year	Winner
2006	West Moreton
2005	St Paul's
2004	St Columban's
2003	Ormiston
2002†	Ormiston • Stuartholme
2001	Scots PGC
2000	Scots PGC

Premierships:

- 2000–present: Ormiston (7), Cannon Hill (3), West Moreton (3), Loreto (2), St Paul's (2), Scots PGC (2), Canterbury (1), John Paul (1), St Columban's (1), Stuartholme (1).

† indicates shared premiership for the year.

=== First VII Netball ===
List of First VII premiers for The Associated Schools (since 2000) and the Independent Schools Association (1988–1999) are listed below. The Associated Schools had blue and red conference divisions from 2000 to 2013, and the higher blue division premiership winners are listed for those years:

Year	Winner
2020	No premiership^{b}
2019	St Columban's
2018	St Columban's
2017	John Paul
2016	John Paul
2015	John Paul
2014	John Paul
2013	John Paul
2012	John Paul
2011	John Paul
2010	John Paul

Year	Winner
2009	John Paul
2008	John Paul
2007	John Paul
2006	John Paul
2005	John Paul
2004	John Paul
2003	John Paul
2002	John Paul
2001	John Paul
2000	John Paul
1999	John Paul

Year	Winner
1998†	John Paul • Loreto
1997	John Paul
1996	John Paul
1995	John Paul
1994	
1993	
1992	
1991	
1990	
1989†	Loreto • Redeemer
1988	

Premierships:

- 2000–present: John Paul (18), St Columban's (2).
- ISA, 1988–1999: John Paul (5), Loreto (2), Redeemer (1).

† indicates shared premiership for the year.

== Notes ==
^a Many of these schools withdrew from TAS to form the Associated Independent Colleges after the 1998 competition season.

^b Due to the COVID-19 pandemic, no aggregate school championships were awarded in swimming, cross country and athletics (limited individual events were contested only). Open premierships were only awarded for the first trimester sports.
