= Redeemer Lutheran School =

Redeemer Lutheran School is a name for several Lutheran schools and may refer to:

In Australia

- Redeemer Lutheran College in Biloela and Rochedale, Queensland
- Redeemer Lutheran School (South Australia) in Nuriootpa, South Australia

In the United States

- Redeemer Lutheran Church and School (Arizona) in Tucson, Arizona
- Christ Our Redeemer Lutheran School in Aurora, Colorado
- Redeemer Lutheran School (Florida) in Pensacola, Florida
- Redeemer Lutheran School (Indiana) in Kokomo, Indiana
- Redeemer Christian Academy in Wayzata, Minnesota
- Redeemer Lutheran School (New York) in Queens, New York
- Redeemer Lutheran School (Pennsylvania) in Verona, Pennsylvania
- Redeemer Lutheran School (Texas) in Austin, Texas
- Our Redeemer Lutheran School (Texas) in Dallas, Texas
- Redeemer Lutheran Church and School (Utah) in Salt Lake City, Utah
- Our Redeemer Lutheran School (Delavan, Wisconsin) in Delavan, Wisconsin
- Our Redeemer Lutheran School (Madison, Wisconsin) in Madison, Wisconsin
