= Potemnemus trimaculatus =

Scientific classification
- Kingdom: Animalia
- Phylum: Arthropoda
- Class: Insecta
- Order: Coleoptera
- Suborder: Polyphaga
- Infraorder: Cucujiformia
- Family: Cerambycidae
- Genus: Potemnemus
- Species: P. trimaculatus

Binomial name
- Potemnemus trimaculatus Lea, 1918

Synonyms
- Potemnemus detzneri Kriesche, 1923

Species of beetle

Potemnemus trimaculatus is a species of beetle in the family Cerambycidae. It is known from Papua New Guinea and Australia. It feeds on Araucaria cunninghamii.
