= Hazza =

Australian singer and television presenter

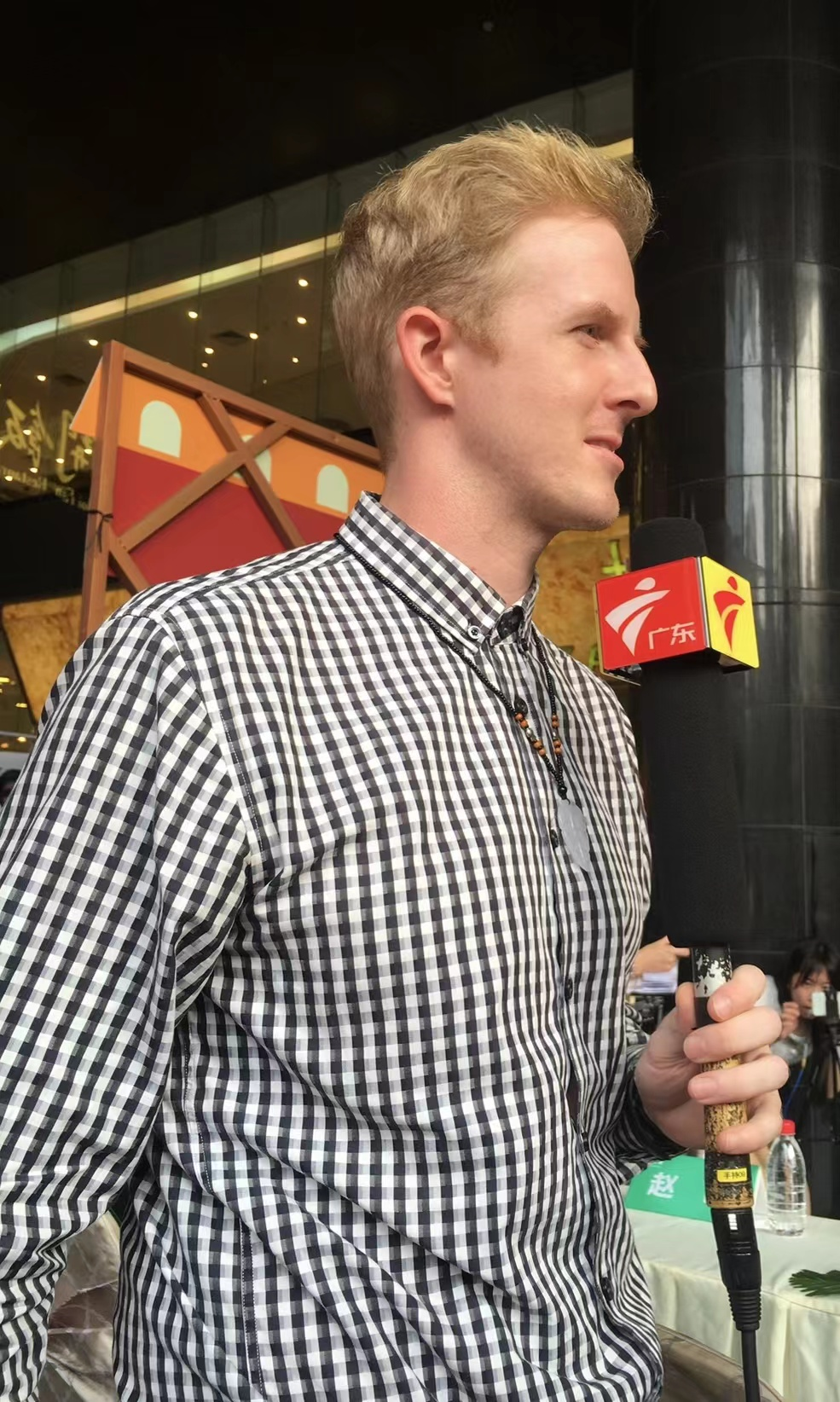

Background information
- Born: Harry Patrick Harding; 16 June 1990 (age 36); Ipswich, Queensland, Australia
- Genres: Mandopop, pop
- Occupations: Singer, television presenter
- Instrument: Vocals
- Years active: 2011–present
- Website: https://www.hazzachina.com/

Harry Harding (born 16 June 1990 in Ipswich, Queensland, Australia), also known as Hazza Harding and simply his stage name Hazza, is a journalist, television presenter, radio host and singer previously based in China. His debut single, "Let Go", was released on iTunes 8 August 2012, along with a music video that was shot in Australia. Hazza won "Most Popular Internet Celebrity 2011" at the 56.com Short film awards ceremony in Beijing. On November 23, 2020, Hazza announced via his Twitter account that his single "I Was Wrong" had peaked at No.5 on a national music chart in China, broadcast on more than 25 radio stations across mainland China, Hong Kong and Macao. Hazza stepped down as host of Guangdong Report on August 31, 2022, the same day that the OHCHR Assessment of human rights concerns in the Xinjiang Uyghur Autonomous Region, People's Republic of China, was issued, delivering an unscripted farewell message to viewers, a practice frowned upon within China’s heavily controlled state media system. Since exiting China, Harding has also spoken openly about experiencing discrimination and targeting during the COVID-19 pandemic in China as a foreigner in the country.

== Journalism and presenting ==
Hazza worked as a presenter at Guangdong Radio and Television (previously Guangdong TV), where he has hosted the talk show FaceTime from 2012 to 2021, with a short break during a stint at HKSTV. He also featured on various programmes for the network after his tenure on HKSTV during 2014 to 2015, and anchored news programmes such as The Guangdong Report and Guangdong News Now, plus live specials for the network through 2022.

In 2017, Hazza won first prize at China News Award, a prestigious national-level award presented to outstanding journalists in the country, for his work on a radio feature report about innovative companies of Guangdong province and its connections with Australia. Harding was reportedly the first Australian to win the China News Award First Prize. He has also regularly published articles for Xinhua News Agency since late 2017.

Commenting on then Australian Prime Minister Scott Morrison’s calling of a press conference to respond to a social media graphic released by a Chinese official in wake of the Brereton Report, Hazza commented on a tweet on Twitter that he had considered for the first time "relinquishing his Australian citizenship"; he also apologised in the tweet for Australia's excessive response to a graphic posted on Twitter. He since clarified via media interviews that he is a patriotic Australian, and Chinese media called the comments “the highest act of love for one's country."

Hazza was one of few Chinese state media presenters openly opposed to Russia's invasion of Ukraine, and referred to the conflict as an "invasion" on numerous occasions during televised broadcasts.

Aside from his work in China, Hazza has also worked with a number of Australian television channels, including ABC Australia and 7two, with episodes listed on the Freeview (Australia) website.

In an exclusive interview with Australian Broadcasting Corporation’s 7:30 in May 2023, Hazza revealed he had been approached on two occasions by individuals who may have been working for foreign intelligence agencies. Hazza claimed he did not know which country the individuals were working for, but connections to the Russian propaganda website New Eastern Outlook suggest one approach was made by Russian operatives working in China targeting foreign nationals, and the ABC investigation revealed the initial approach was made by a member of China’s United Front Work Department.

== Music ==
Hazza began his music career by posting cover songs to popular Chinese video sharing websites. Combined, Hazza's videos have received in excess of 100 million hits. In June 2012, Hazza recorded his debut single, "Let Go" (Chinese: 该走的都走吧). The single was released later that year on iTunes, and peaked at #1 on the local radio music charts in Guangzhou, and stayed in the top ten for 13 weeks. The second single, a collaboration with Chinese singer-songwriter Wu Huan, "No Worries" (Chinese: 无所不欢), was released on 28 October 2014 and peaked at #3 on local radio charts. His third single, "Mr Gentleman" (Chinese: 绅士先生), was released on 2015. On 23 November 2020, Hazza announced via his Twitter account that his single "I Was Wrong," a song about a personal breakup, had peaked at No.5 on a national music chart in China, broadcast on more than 25 radio stations across mainland China, Hong Kong and Macao. In a recent interview, Hazza announced we was working on a new single set for release late 2022.

In January 2025, Hazza Harding launched and regularly updated for a short period a Xiaohongshu account with short music videos. He gained 30,000 followers over a three-month period, but ceased posting in April of 2025.

== Personal life ==
Hazza grew up in Ipswich, Australia and attended West Moreton Anglican College where he was school captain. Hazza completed his Bachelor of Arts in Applied Linguistics at Griffith University. Hazza completed a Master of International Relations at Griffith University in 2024. Harding was married to a Chinese national referred to as "Wayne", who died of a heart attack in 2019. Harding was unable to access spousal rights as China does not acknowledge same-sex relationships, contributing to his decision to leave China.

== Awards and nominations ==
Year	Type	Award	Result
2012	56.com Short Film Awards	Most Popular Internet Celebrity	Won
2013	Guangzhou Top 10 Music Chart	Best Male Newcomer	Won (bronze)
2016	Guangdong News Award	First Prize	Won
2017	China News Award	First Prize	Won
