= Bridey Condren =

Australian netballer (born 1999)

Personal information
- Born: 16 December 1999 (age 26) Mackay, Queensland, Australia
- Height: 1.88 m (6 ft 2 in)
- School: John Paul College (Brisbane)

Netball career
- Playing positions: GK, GD
Years	Club team	Apps
2019	Queensland Firebirds	0
2020	West Coast Fever	1
2022	Sunshine Coast Lightning	1

Bridey Condren (born 16 December 1999) is an Australian netballer, playing for the Sunshine Coast Lightning in the Suncorp Super Netball league.

Condren's first professional team was the Queensland Firebirds as a training partner, sitting on the bench for one game in 2019. In 2020, she moved to the West Coast Fever as cover for an injured Courtney Bruce, playing one game. In 2022, she joined the Sunshine Coast Lightning and made her debut against the New South Wales Swifts.
