= Potemnemus wheatcrofti =

Scientific classification
- Kingdom: Animalia
- Phylum: Arthropoda
- Class: Insecta
- Order: Coleoptera
- Suborder: Polyphaga
- Infraorder: Cucujiformia
- Family: Cerambycidae
- Genus: Potemnemus
- Species: P. wheatcrofti

Binomial name
- Potemnemus wheatcrofti (Breuning, 1971)

Synonyms
- Parapotemnemus wheatcrofti Breuning, 1971

Species of beetle

Potemnemus wheatcrofti is a species of beetle in the family Cerambycidae. It was described by Breuning in 1971.
