= St Columban's College, Caboolture =

St Columban's College

Location
- Caboolture, Queensland; Australia
- Coordinates: 27.0785°S 152.9634°E

Information
- Type: Independent systemic secondary day school
- Motto: Every Student, Every Success
- Religious affiliation: Catholicism
- Established: 1928; 98 years ago
- Oversight: Archdiocese of Brisbane
- Principal: Michael Connolly
- Staff: 78
- Years offered: 7–12
- Gender: Co-educational
- Enrolment: 1,200 (2009)
- Colours: Blue and gold
- Slogan: Spirit, Tradition, Community
- Affiliation: The Associated Schools, Brisbane Catholic Education
- Website: www.stc.qld.edu.au

St Columban's College is an independent Catholic systemic secondary day school for boys and girls, located at 100 McKean Street, Caboolture, Queensland, Australia. Founded by the Congregation of Christian Brothers in 1928, co-educational school has been run via the Catholic Education Office of the Archdiocese of Brisbane since 1986. Situated on 12 hectares (30 acres), the school caters for approximately 1,200 students from Year 7 to Year 12.

The campus is located approximately 50 kilometres (31 mi) north of Brisbane. The campus moved to Caboolture in 1997 from the original college site at Albion due to changing demographics of that inner-Brisbane suburban area.

== History ==
St Columban's was established by the Congregation of Christian Brothers in 1928 at Albion as a school for boys. St Columban's College commenced as another practical outreach by the Congregation of the Christian Brothers, in providing readily accessible education for young boys. The college developed a working-class identity with strong patronage from the racing fraternity, reaching a maximum enrolment of some 850 boys from Years 5 to 12 during the 1980s. Always supported by an active parental group, the college thrived through the 1960s and 1970s, being associated with some well-known Brisbane events, including the Colana Carnival.

Throughout its history the college gained a reputation for having a strong identity in sport, with its students being called upon to ‘have a go’. St Columban's College is the only founding member of The Associated Schools association, established in 1947, which continues to compete in the competition. In 1985 the Congregation of the Christian Brothers formally handed the college over to the Archdiocese of Brisbane.

In 1988 and 1989, the intake for Year 8 slowly dropped. Michael Harkin, the second lay principal, attempted to stem the loss of enrolments that followed during these ensuing years. Despite these efforts, the drop in numbers became steady and continuous. In 1989, number had dropped to 425 students when only 15 years earlier, numbers were at 800. In 1995 a decision was made to relocate a financially unviable college campus to Caboolture. Preparation commenced for a new co-educational campus with an inventory created of how and what to move from a college in order to preserve its best qualities.

== Notable alumni ==
- Andrew Bartlett – politician, former Australian Democrats and Greens Senator for Queensland
- Peter Bonner – artist, winner Dobell Prize for drawing
- Brandon Borrello – Australian soccer player
- Ella Connolly – sprinter, bronze medalist at the 2022 Commonwealth Games
- Trevor Gillmeister – rugby league player for Queensland Maroons and Australian Kangaroos
- Ronan Lee – former Member of Parliament and Queensland Parliamentary Secretary
- Rod McCall – rugby union player for Queensland Reds and Australian Wallabies
- Lakeisha Patterson – swimmer who competed in the Paralympic Games
- Michael Putney – Bishop of Townsville; 6th President of the National Council of Churches in Australia
- Taylah Robertson – boxer, bronze medalist at the 2018 Commonwealth Games
- Luke Williamson – rugby league player for Adelaide, Canberra, and Manly
- Harry Wright – Australian air force officer and activist

== See also ==
- Catholic education in Australia
- List of schools in Queensland
