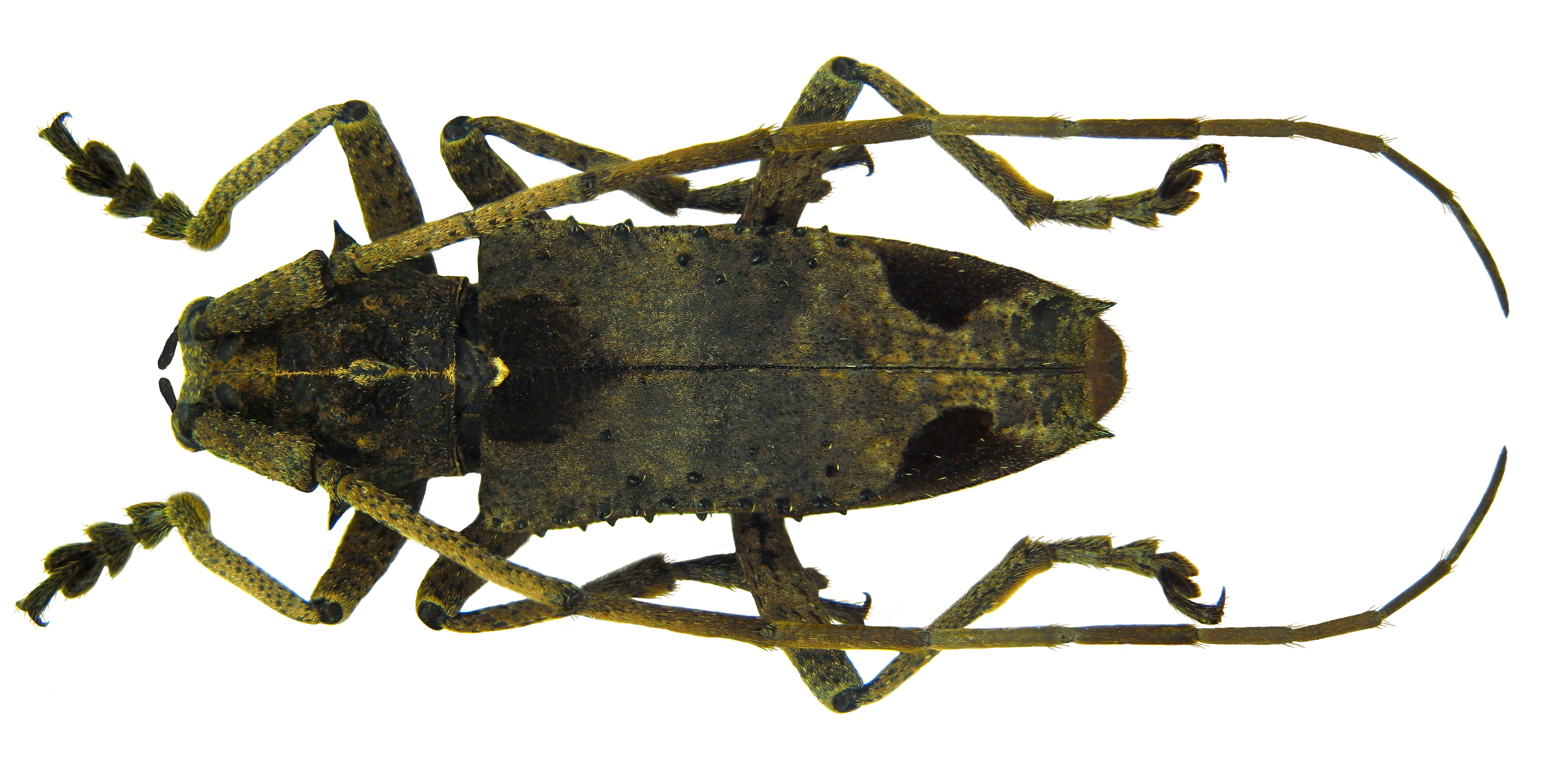
- Potemnemus scabrosus

Scientific classification
- Kingdom: Animalia
- Phylum: Arthropoda
- Class: Insecta
- Order: Coleoptera
- Suborder: Polyphaga
- Infraorder: Cucujiformia
- Family: Cerambycidae
- Tribe: Lamiini
- Genus: Potemnemus; Thomson, 1864

Synonyms
- Parapotemnemus Breuning, 1971; Spinopotemnemus Breuning, 1973

= Potemnemus =

Genus of beetles

Potemnemus is a genus of longhorn beetles of the subfamily Lamiinae, containing the following species:

- Potemnemus ennevei de Jong, 1945
- Potemnemus kaszabi (Breuning, 1973)
- Potemnemus lima Pascoe, 1866
- Potemnemus nylanderi Wallin & Kvamme, 2015
- Potemnemus pristis Pascoe, 1866
- Potemnemus rosenbergii Vollenhoven, 1871
- Potemnemus sepicanus Kriesche, 1923 [= hispidus]
- Potemnemus scabrosus (Olivier, 1790) [= loriai, trituberculatus]
- Potemnemus thomsoni Lansberge, 1880
- Potemnemus trimaculatus Lea, 1918 [= detzneri]
- Potemnemus tuberifer Gahan, 1894
- Potemnemus wheatcrofti (Breuning, 1971)
- Potemnemus wolfi Berchmans, 1925
