= Potemnemus rosenbergii =

Scientific classification
- Kingdom: Animalia
- Phylum: Arthropoda
- Class: Insecta
- Order: Coleoptera
- Suborder: Polyphaga
- Infraorder: Cucujiformia
- Family: Cerambycidae
- Genus: Potemnemus
- Species: P. rosenbergii

Binomial name
- Potemnemus rosenbergii Vollenhoven, 1871

Synonyms
- Potemnemus rosenbergi Aurivillius, 1922 (Lapsus calami); Protemnemus rosenbergii Snellen van Vollenhoven, 1871 (Lapsus calami); Potemnemus rosenbergi ferrugineus Kriesche, 1923

Species of beetle

Potemnemus rosenbergii is a species of beetle in the family Cerambycidae. It was described by Vollenhoven in 1871, originally with the genus misspelled as "Protemnemus". It is known from Papua New Guinea.
