= Helen Dale =

Australian writer and lawyer (born 1972)

- Born: Helen Darville; 1972 (age 53–54)
- Other name: Helen Demidenko
- Education: University of Queensland; Brasenose College, University of Oxford; University of Edinburgh School of Law
- Occupation: Lawyer
- Known for: 1994 Australian literary controversy
- Notable work: The Hand That Signed the Paper
- Awards: Miles Franklin Literary Award (1995); Australian Literature Society Gold Medal (1995); Law Society of Scotland New Lawyer Essay Competition (2012)

Helen Dale (born Helen Darville; 1972) is an Australian writer and lawyer. She is best known for writing The Hand That Signed the Paper, a novel about a Ukrainian family who collaborated with the Nazis in the Holocaust, under the pseudonym Helen Demidenko.

A daughter of British immigrants, Dale was educated at Redeemer Lutheran College in Rochedale, a suburb of Brisbane. While studying English literature at the University of Queensland, she wrote The Hand That Signed the Paper, an award-winning novel that was subject to controversy. After teaching, Dale returned to university, gaining her law degree in 2005. She later did post-graduate law study at Oxford and completed an LLM degree in 2012 at the University of Edinburgh.

Dale was a senior adviser to David Leyonhjelm, a Libertarian Party member of the Australian Senate. She makes regular editorial contributions to right-wing media outlets.

== Early life and education ==
A daughter of British immigrants, Dale was educated at Redeemer Lutheran College in Rochedale, a suburb of Brisbane. She has claimed that her father was Ukrainian and her mother Irish.

Dale wrote in the Australian Skeptic magazine that, in the aftermath of her novel's controversy c. 2000, she lived in London for two years, teaching and playing sports. She returned to the University of Queensland in 2002 to study law, and after graduating in 2005 became an associate to Peter Dutney at the Supreme Court of Queensland.

Dale completed the Bachelor of Civil Law programme at the University of Oxford in 2008, after which she studied for an MPhil in law. She completed a graduate law degree at the Edinburgh Law School in 2012.

== The Hand That Signed the Paper ==
The novel is narrated by Fiona Kovalenko, a university student of Irish-Ukrainian descent living in the Australian state of Queensland. Fiona's uncle Vitaly has been charged with crimes against humanity for his service as a guard at the Treblinka extermination camp. The novel recounts Vitaly and his siblings' upbringing in Ukraine amid the Holodomor, positing that perceived Jewish involvement in Bolshevism was a motive for Ukrainian participation in the Holocaust. The novel explores the moral responsibility of the Holocaust's perpetrators and suggests that it is unjust to prosecute Nazi collaborators like Fiona's father and uncle for actions taken during the war.

== Other literary work ==
In 1995, Dale published the short story "Pieces of the Puzzle" in the Australian culture journal Meanjin. The byline was 'Demidenko', although the journal noted that by the time of publication, the author had changed her legal name back to 'Darville'.

The first book of Dale's duology Kingdom of the Wicked, Rules, came out in 2017, and the second, Order, in 2018. It is a reimagining of the trial of Jesus Christ at the hands of Pontius Pilate in a technologically sophisticated Roman Empire.

== David Irving interview ==
In 2000, Dale was again accused of antisemitism after interviewing David Irving, a Holocaust denier, for Australian Style magazine during a libel trial in London that was decided against him. Robert Manne criticized Dale's sympathy for Irving in The Age.

== Editorials ==
Dale was a columnist with the Brisbane daily newspaper The Courier-Mail. She was dismissed for plagiarism after copying jokes originally from the "Evil Overlord list". She continued to write commentaries for News Corp and the Fairfax.

In 2017, an investigation by BuzzFeed revealed that Dale had also plagiarised a number of social media posts in her Twitter and Facebook feeds.

Dale has contributed to The Spectator Australia, to the libertarian magazine Reason, and to Quillette.

She was a regular contributor to the libertarian group blog Catallaxy Files, under the name 'skepticlawyer'. She then created her own blog of the same name. She also published commentaries on her newsletter Not on Your Team, but Always Fair.

== Politics ==
Dale identifies as a libertarian. In 2014, she became a senior adviser to David Leyonhjelm, a Libertarian member of the Australian Senate. She resigned during the election campaign in 2016. During her tenure, she wrote posts on her socials against renewables.

== Right-wing organizations ==
Dale has been listed as an author at CapX, owned and produced by the Centre for Policy Studies. She has also been listed as a contributor to libertarianism.org, from the Cato Institute, and to Law and Liberty, from the Liberty Fund.

She has been made a fellow at the Civitas Institute, which merged with the John Locke Foundation in 2020. She has also been listed at the Centre for Independent Studies, an Australian think tank.

Dale is listed on the page of the John Locke Institute faculty, where she says she has "consulted".

== Awards ==
In 1993, The Hand That Signed the Paper won the Australian/Vogel Literary Award for an unpublished manuscript. It won the Miles Franklin Award when published in 1994 and the 1995 Australian Literature Society Gold Medal when re-published under Dale's real name.

In 2012, Dale won the Law Society of Scotland's student essay competition, writing on the topic of same-sex marriage.
