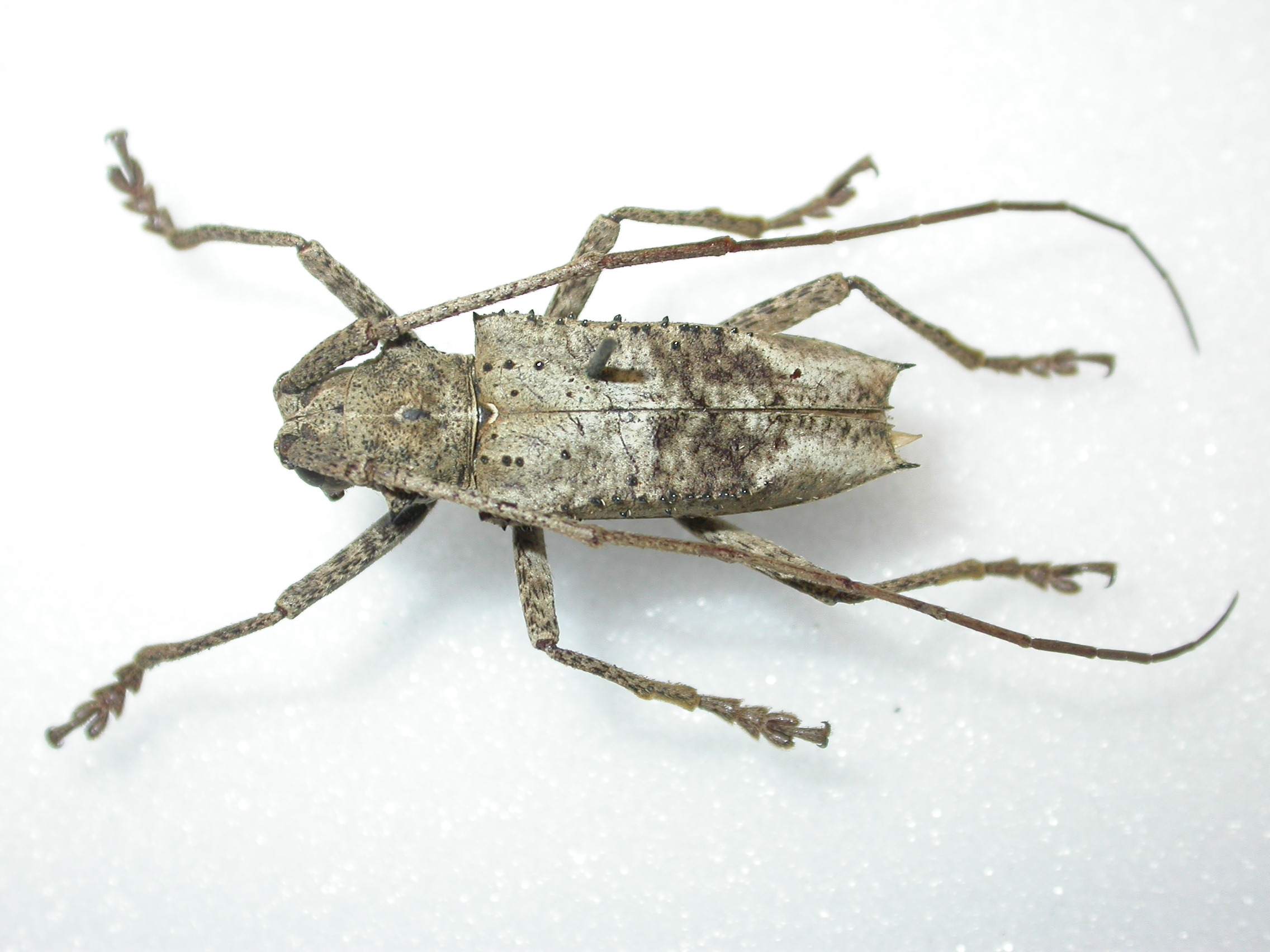
- Potemnemus pristis

Scientific classification
- Kingdom: Animalia
- Phylum: Arthropoda
- Class: Insecta
- Order: Coleoptera
- Suborder: Polyphaga
- Infraorder: Cucujiformia
- Family: Cerambycidae
- Genus: Potemnemus
- Species: P. pristis

Binomial name
- Potemnemus pristis Pascoe, 1866

= Potemnemus pristis =

Species of beetle

Potemnemus pristis is a species of beetle in the family Cerambycidae. It was described by Francis Polkinghorne Pascoe in 1866. It is known from Papua New Guinea and Moluccas.
