= Constance Mackness =

Teacher and author (1882–1973)

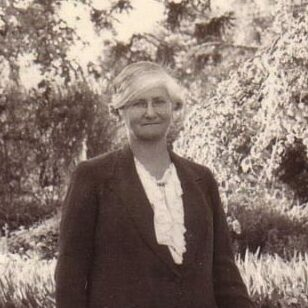
- she retired in 1949
- Born: 17 June 1882; Tuena
- Died: 13 December 1973 (aged 91); Corinda
- Education: Fort Street High School and the University of Sydney
- Known for: writer and founding head of The Presbyterian Girls' College

Constance Mackness MBE (June 17, 1882 – December 13, 1973) was an Australian headteacher and author. She wrote ten books and she was the founding head of the Presbyterian Ladies' College, Warwick.

== Life ==
Mackness was born in 1882 in Tuena in New South Wales. Her mother was born in Australia, and her father was an English immigrant who had arrived in Australia as the result of a shipwreck in time for the gold rush and the rebellion in Eureka. An account of her childhood was published in 1915, "Gem of the Flat", that was illustrated by May Gibbs. The story tells of a girl from "Needy Flat" who has a poor home but dreams of being a lady. She was educated at the Fort Street High School where she was the first female dux and one of three of their girls to continue at the University of Sydney.

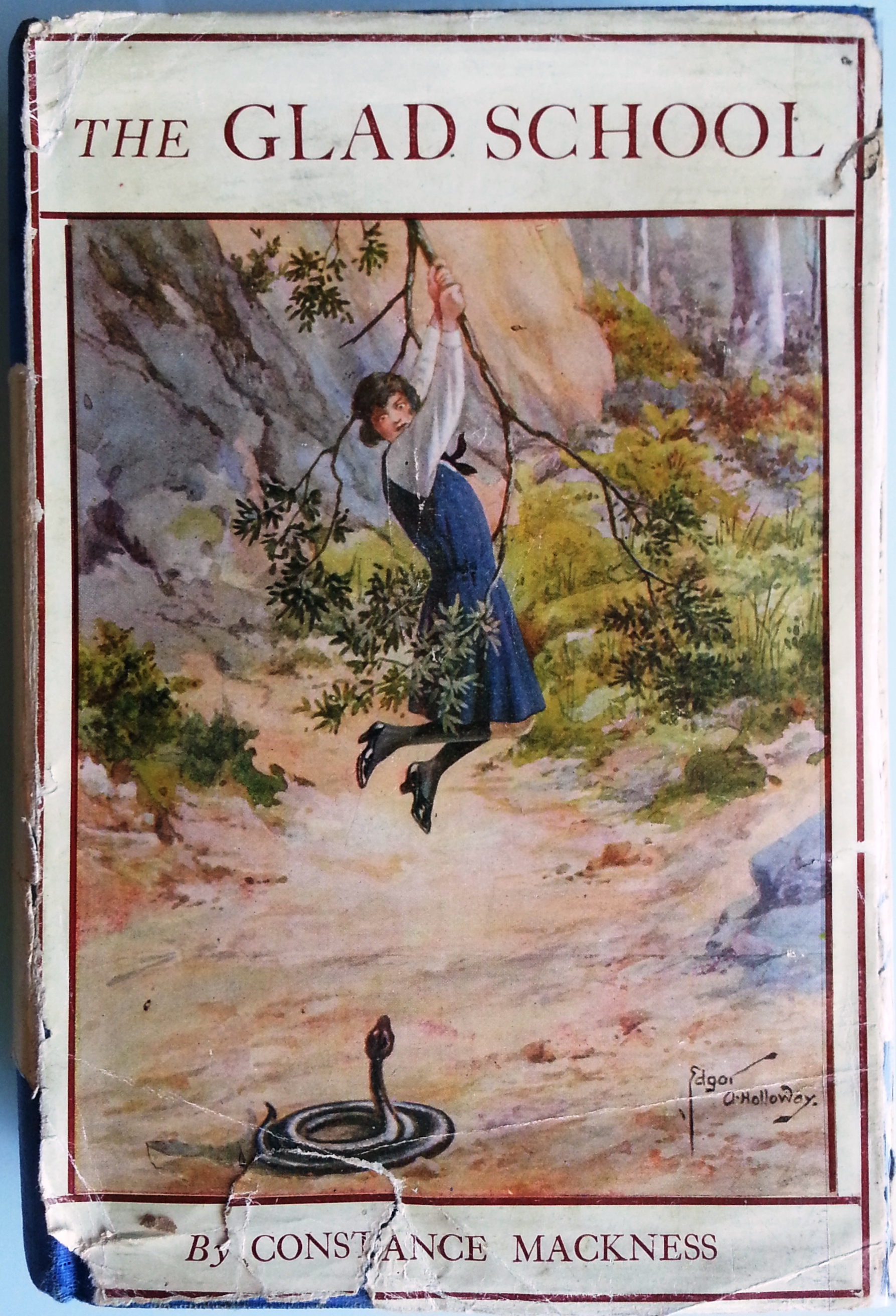
The Glad School by Constance Mackness

She gained a first class degree in French and History and a prize for her work on physical geography. She started teaching at the Presbyterian Ladies' College in Croydon, and continued at Presbyterian Ladies' College in Pymble, where she was head of one of their houses.

She was then given the key job of her life which was to be the founding headmistress of Presbyterian Ladies' College, Warwick. She gave the school the McInnes clan motto, which is "Work brings happiness."

In 1927, she published "The Blossom Children", which is a story set in 1917. It has been argued that this is a socialist story about an ideal world of "Mackness's feminine philosophies". The thirteen year old central figure, Pan, is said to embody "girlness". Also in 1927, she wrote her best selling book, "The Glad School". She wrote ten books during her teaching career.

Her school in Warwick, Presbyterian Ladies' College, was merged with the nearby boys school in 1970 to create Scots PGC College. Mackness died in 1973 in Corinda.
