= Suicide of Dolly Everett =

2018 suicide in Queensland, Australia

Dolly Everett
- Born: Amy Jayne Everett; 1 May 2003; Katherine, Northern Territory, Australia
- Died: 3 January 2018 (aged 14); Queensland, Australia
- Cause of death: Suicide
- Education: Scots PGC College
- Occupation: Student
- Known for: Teenager who committed suicide after being a victim of Cyberbullying; Inspiration for charity "Dolly's Dream Foundation"; Former Akubra brand ambassador

Amy Jayne "Dolly" Everett (1 May 2003 – 3 January 2018) was a 14-year-old Australian teenager who died by suicide after extensive bullying. Her death sparked debates about teen suicide, racial and gender imbalance in media reporting of suicide and the dangers of publicity around suicides and emphasising victim playing, glorifying and promoting suicide.

Everett was from Katherine in the Australian Northern Territory and had attended Scots PGC College in Warwick, Queensland. When she was younger, Everett had been a face in advertisements for Akubra hats.

== Tributes and legacy ==
Everett's suicide prompted tributes and reactions, including many from those who had not known her. Memorial services for Everett were held in Katherine and Warwick at which mourners were encouraged to wear Everett's favourite colour, blue.

Everett's parents launched a social media campaign using the hashtag #DoItForDolly to raise awareness of the effects of bullying and a foundation called the Dolly's Dream Foundation, with support from the Alannah and Madeline Foundation, which raised over $106,000 in three months by GoFundMe, and shared a drawing by Everett, depicting a figure underneath the words "stand up, speak even if your voice shakes", a quote which has since been used to encourage young bullying victims to speak up about their experiences.

The New South Wales Liberal/National Government passed legislation criminalising certain cyberbullying which was referred to as Dolly's Law.

== Reporting issues ==
The Australian Government media initiative, "Mindframe", raised a number of concerns about the way the media were covering the death of Everett. It criticised the media for sharing a memorial video released by Everett's family, suggesting that the promotion of such public memorials should be avoided, due to the risk it posed to those experiencing similar life circumstances, or who were having suicidal thoughts. Mindframe also urged the media to stop implying Everett's suicide was caused solely by cyberbullying.

In the wake of Everett's death, there were also calls to ban or police social media apps known to be used for cyberbullying, such as Sarahah. However, some commentators, such as Ginger Gorman, described the calls as knee-jerk reactions that would likely be ineffective and could potentially remove online support for bullying victims.

Other commentators viewed the substantial media interest and public outcry generated by Everett's death as an example of what they perceived to be an indifference to an ongoing youth suicide crisis among Aboriginal Australians, which attracts little media interest.
