= Taj Pabari =

Australian entrepreneur

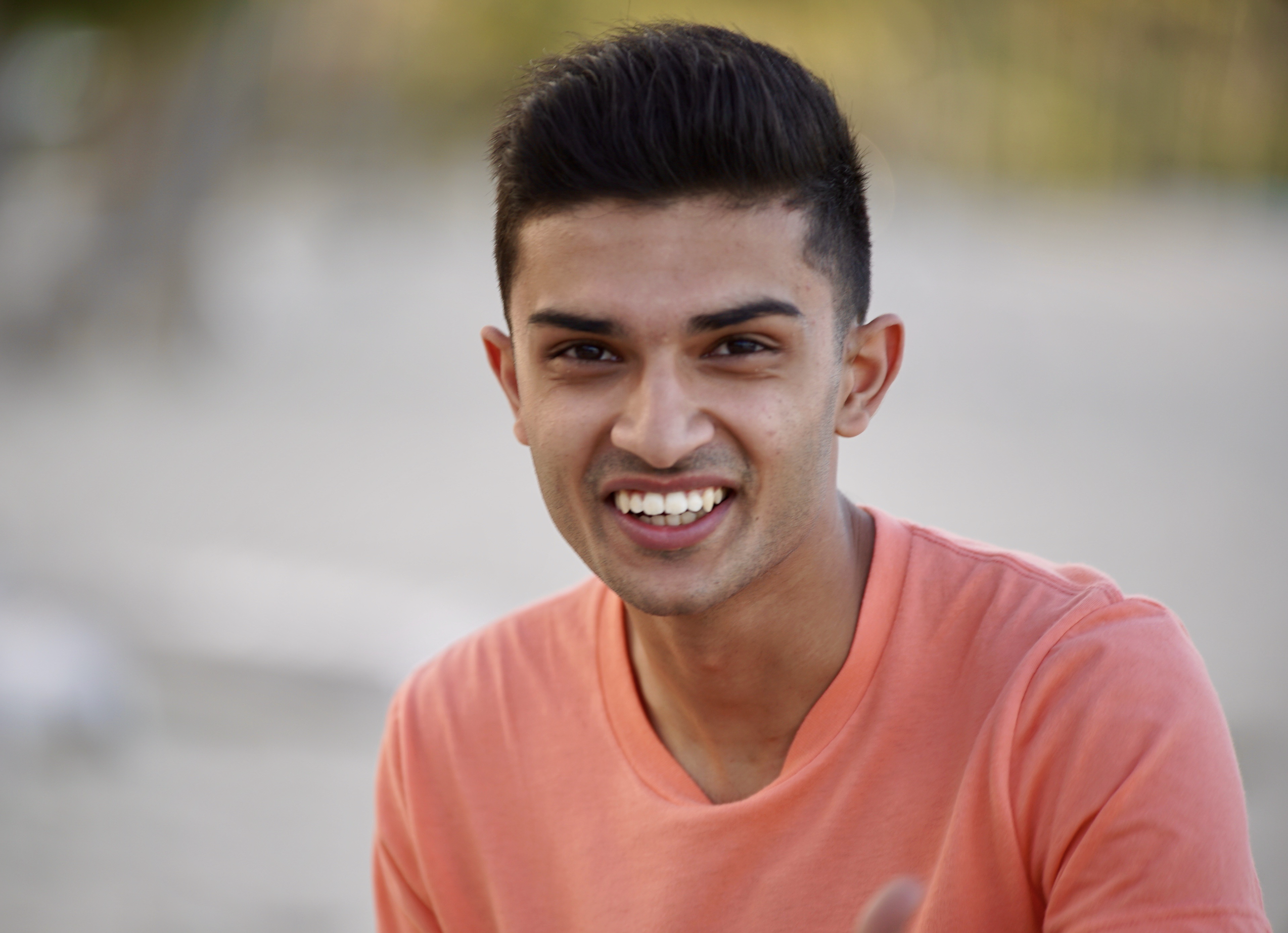
- Born: London, United Kingdom
- Education: John Paul College
- Occupation: Social entrepreneur
- Years active: 2014–present
- Known for: Youth entrepreneurship
- Website: tajpabari.com

Taj Pabari is a British born - Australian based entrepreneur. He is the co-founder of The ASE Group, a social enterprise that helps develop the life skills and entrepreneurial skills of Australians of all ages.

Pabari was named the 2017 Queensland Young Australian of the Year and The Australian Young Innovator of the Year for 2014. Pabari is best known for his work in youth entrepreneurship and the future of work commentary.

== Early life ==
Pabari was born in London, England and moved to Brisbane, Australia at the age of one.

He was educated at John Paul College and was frequently suspended during school. He became interested in business and started his first online business age the age of ten.

Pabari launched Fiftysix Creations in 2014 by selling do-it-yourself electronic tablets for kids. In 2016, Fiftysix Creations began running digital literacy programs for indigenous students in Australia. In 2017, Pabari was appointed by Queensland Premier, Annastacia Palaszczuk to the Queensland Plan Ambassadors Council and the Premier's Anti-Cyberbullying Task Force.

== Career ==
In 2020, Pabari co-founded The ASE Group. The organisation delivers education, entrepreneurship and employment programs with the Queensland Government and the Australian Government.

== Media and public appearances ==
Pabari has appeared as an education commentator on The Today Show, CNBC and the ABC. He has given two TEDx talks and has been a featured speaker at the World Science Festival alongside Nobel laureate, Brian Schmidt.

== Awards and nominations ==
In 2014, Pabari won The Australian Young Innovator of the Year Award, an award given to the most exciting innovator and emerging talent. The category was presented by then Assistant Treasurer, Senator Arthur Sinodinos in Canberra, Australia. In 2017, Pabari won the Queensland Young Australian of the Year Award in Brisbane, Australia. He is the youngest recipient of the award since its formation in 1979.

In 2020, Pabari was listed in the Courier Mail Logan 50 most influential people list. In 2021, he was listed as one of the 40 Under 40: Most Influential Asian-Australians by Asialink. In 2023, he was listed in the Courier Mail Top 30 Young Entrepreneurs Under 30 list.

Year	Award	Category	Result
2014	The Australian	Young Innovator of the Year	Won
2016	Queensland Government	Community Digital Champion	Won
2017	National Australia Day Council	Young Australian of the Year	Nominated
2017	National Australia Day Council	Queensland Young Australian of the Year	Won
2017	Westpac	Business of Tomorrow - Top 20	Won
