= Hoop Pines, Bald Hills =

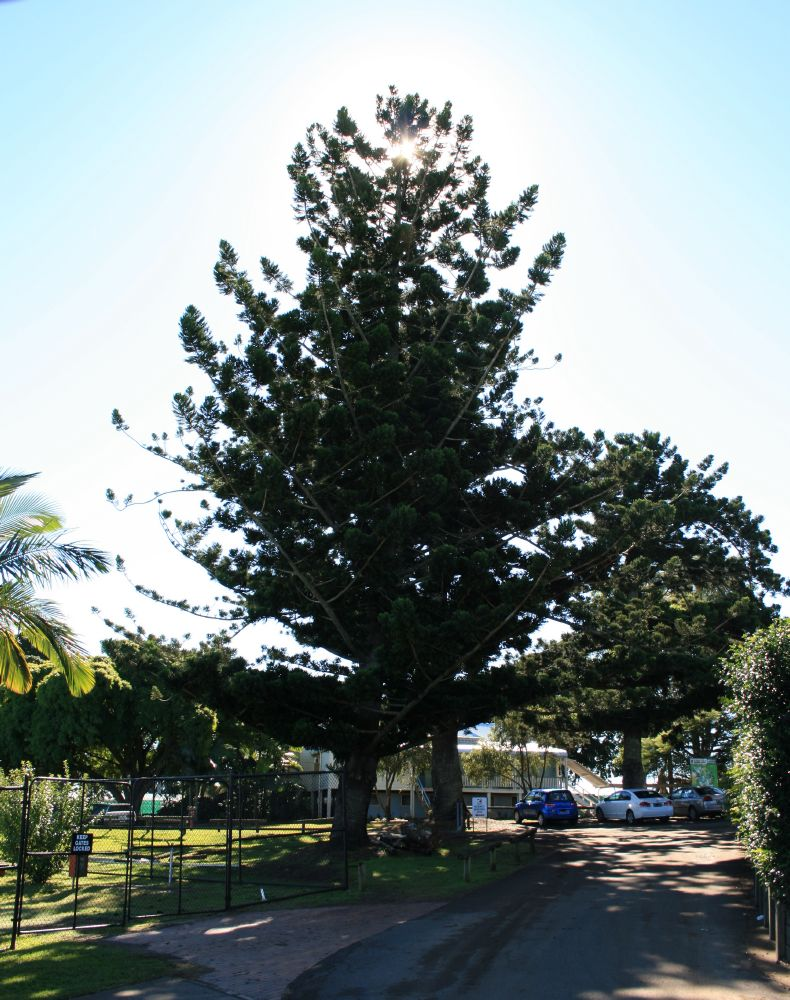
- Hoop Pines, 2009

- Location within Queensland Location within Australia
- 27.3151°S 153.0041°E
- Location: 34 Strathpine Road, Bald Hills, City of Brisbane, Queensland, Australia

History
- Design period: 1840s–1860s (mid-19th century)

Queensland Heritage Register
- Official name: Hoop Pines
- Type: state heritage (landscape)
- Designated: 22 February 2002
- Reference no.: 602346
- Significant period: 1850s (historical)

The Hoop Pines are a heritage-listed pair of Araucaria cunninghamii trees at 34 Strathpine Road, Bald Hills, City of Brisbane, Queensland, Australia. They were added to the Queensland Heritage Register on 22 February 2002.

== History ==
The two mature hoop pines situated in front of the Administration Building of St Paul's Anglican School, Bald Hills, are believed to mark the location of the original Stewart Farmhouse at Bald Hills. The Stewart family, along with their relatives the Duncans, were the earliest non-indigenous settlers in the Bald Hills area (known to Aboriginal people as Wyampa) and later established one of the district's most successful dairy farms. The taller of the hoop pines may be remnant old growth vegetation, approximately 190 years old. The smaller hoop pine may be approximately 140 years old – either planted or a seedling from the older tree.

The prevalence of valuable logging trees such as hoop and bunya pines and red cedar was one of the principal attractions for the establishment of a penal settlement at Moreton Bay in the 1820s. Historian JD Steele suggests that "Brisbane owes its foundations to Oxley's enthusiasm for its river and its indigenous pine tree, Araucaria cunninghamii, usually known as the hoop pine. The tree was first observed by Oxley on 1 December 1823, on the banks of the Pine River near Petrie . . .". Within 50 years, most of the hoop pine had been extracted from the Moreton Bay region.

The establishment of Bald Hills as a farming community in the late 1850s was closely linked to the move by Scottish squatters John and David McConnel of Durundur on the Upper Stanley River (south of the Conondale Range and west of the Glass House Mountains), and their pro-Brisbane, pro-John Dunmore Lang associates, to establish a port at Cabbage Tree Creek, Sandgate in the 1850s. The move was given impetus with the reinstatement of the northern passage to Moreton Bay, around the northern end of Moreton Island and south past Redcliffe and Cabbage Tree Creek, as the principal shipping passage in 1848, following the wreck of the Sovereign in the South Passage in March 1847. In the early 1850s the McConnels and their associates, who supported John Dunmore Lang's vision of the development of a "cotton colony" north of Brisbane between Cabbage Tree Creek and South Pine River, lobbied for the establishment of a port at Cabbage Tree Creek, which they claimed was more convenient for shipping than the Brisbane River, offered safe berths for larger vessels, and in particular, would give more direct port access to the Stanley River squatters, who could travel via North Pine through Bald Hills to Cabbage Tree Creek. The McConnels were joined by a number of prominent Brisbane businessmen, including John Richardson, Thomas Dowse, Robert Davidson and George Raff, who in 1852 called for a port to rival Cleveland, and the development of a resort suburb, at Bramble Bay. The New South Wales government had already set aside a village reserve at the head of Cabbage Tree Creek, and now the Scottish connection was pushing for its survey and the survey of a road from Brisbane. The village was surveyed in 1852 and in November 1853 the first Sandgate town lots were offered at public auction. There was much interest, and high prices were obtained, with the McConnels, Dowse and Robert Davidson purchasing heavily.

Sandgate never did develop as a port, development being retarded by government decisions, the inaction of early speculative landowners, poor communication with Brisbane, and strong Aboriginal resistance to European settlement. However, the lobby group did not give up hope through the 1850s, and the enticement of agricultural settlers to the Bald Hills area behind Sandgate in the mid-1850s may have been connected with move to develop a port at Cabbage Tree Creek. The link is Thomas Gray, who was responsible for encouraging the Stewart and Duncan families to take up land at Bald Hills, and who was connected with the McConnels; and the fact that both he and WJ Loudon, who had invested heavily at the first sale of Sandgate allotments, both purchased allotments at the first sale of Bald Hills land.

Thomas Gray, a Brisbane bootmaker, had emigrated to New South Wales in 1841/42 from the Black Isle, Scotland, to work for fellow highlanders the McConnels at Moreton Bay. During the voyage Gray befriended fellow Scots John Stewart and his sisters Jessie (Janet) and Margaret, and the Duncan brothers and their families. In 1845 Gray married Janet Stewart and John Stewart married the Duncan's sister, Jane. Stewart and the Duncans eventually settled on the Hunter River, while Gray established a bootmaking business in Brisbane in 1844. In the mid-1850s Gray convinced the Stewarts and Duncans to leave the flood-stricken Hunter River district and move to the South Pine River north of Brisbane, to the area now known as Bald Hills. Stewart made a preliminary trip to the district c. 1855 to select suitable land, not just for himself and the Duncans, but also for a large number of Hunter River settlers who were equally interested. Stewart immediately applied to the New South Wales survey office to have the land surveyed, but it was not proclaimed available for sale until December 1856, with Stewart finally purchasing land in February 1857. Due to the delay in survey, most of the interested Hunter River settlers meanwhile had moved to the Clarence River where new land was available. Only Stewart and the Duncans and their families from the Hunter took up land at Bald Hills, moving onto their selections in early October 1857. They are generally acknowledged as the first non-indigenous settlers at Bald Hills.

After their experiences on the Hunter River, the settlers selected the higher ground for their farms, erecting their first houses (apparently slab and bark) on the low ridge above the South Pine River where St Peter's Anglican School is now situated. Fearing attack from Aborigines, their houses were loop-holed for rifles and located within sight of each other. These precautions proved unnecessary, for at the request of Thomas Gray and other settlers in the area between Cabbage Tree Creek and Caboolture, a detachment of Native Police was stationed at Sandgate from 1858 to 1862. Under the command of Lieutenant Frederick Wheeler, the Native Police eliminated Aboriginal resistance to white settlement in the Pine Rivers, Cabbage Tree Creek and Caboolture districts by the early 1860s.

The Stewart and Duncan families cleared the gentle slopes along the South Pine River for their crops. By the end of the 1860s most of the valuable stands of red cedar and hoop pine in the Bald Hills district had been removed, although much scrub remained. Through the 1860s, 1870s and 1880s maize, potatoes and some oaten and wheaten hay were the principal cash crops, and John Stewart had early experimented with arrowroot and cotton, for which he won bronze and silver medals at the London International Exhibition of 1862. Following the opening of a railway to Bald Hills in 1888, dairying became the principal economic activity in the district. By 1929, dairy farmers at Bald Hills were supplying up to 1,000 imperial gallons (4,500 L; 1,200 US gal) of milk daily to Brisbane and Sandgate.

John Stewart and his family were well respected in the Bald Hills community and active members of the local Presbyterian church, John serving as an Elder for nearly 40 years. The earliest Presbyterian services in the Bald Hills district were conducted at the Stewart home until a small slab and shingled church was erected in 1863 at the corner of the Strathpine and Bald Hills roads. In 1889 the slab church was replaced by a milled-timber building erected on land donated by John Stewart in 1887, further west along Strathpine Road. (This building was destroyed by fire in 1909, and replaced with the present building in 1911.) Two of Stewart's sons, James and Charles, became Presbyterian ministers. Rev. James Stewart was the founder of the Brisbane City Mission.

Many local events also were celebrated at the Stewart home, including the opening of the bridge over the South Pine River in May 1865, when a ball was held in the Stewart barn.

In 1890, John Stewart took out a £600 mortgage from the Brisbane Permanent Building and Banking Company Ltd, which may have financed construction of a new residence. If he did, the Stewarts occupied their new house for only a few years, for in 1895 the main portion of the farm – nearly 67 acres (27 ha), including what is understood to be the site of the Stewart family's first residence and the possibly c. 1890 house – was transferred to William Thomas Taylor. The remaining Stewart property was developed as the Woodlawn dairy farm, managed by Alexander Caldwell Stewart until his accidental death in 1900. The Woodlawn Farmhouse survives at 15 Listowel Street, Bald Hills. Jane Stewart died in 1898, and her husband John in 1905, but at least one son continued to dairy farm at Bald Hills for many years. Taylor held the original Stewart property for only a few years, transferring it in February 1898 to Samuel Unwin of Eagle Farm, who in November 1905 took out a £600 mortgage on the property. The residence located on this property and which now functions as the Administration Building at St Paul's Anglican School, appears to date to the 1890s or very early 1900s, but it has not been established whether it was erected by Stewart c. 1890 or a later owner. A photograph dated 1906 shows the house prior to additions and verandah enclosures, with the two already mature hoop pines forming a natural frame to the front entrance. From this evidence it is clear that the trees were not late 19th or early 20th century plantings, and it would have been unusual for them to have survived to the 20th century, were they not incorporated within the earlier Stewart house garden.

The property continued to be worked as a dairy farm, changing hands again in 1907 and also in 1910. In 1921 it was acquired by William John Hawkins of Bald Hills, who was a leader in Queensland dairying, credited with being instrumental in the establishment of the first milk supply cold store in Brisbane, at the Roma Street railway station, c. 1898. In 1929 a Brisbane newspaper described WJ Hawkins as "a successful settler, possessing a fine property and picturesque homestead".

Further ownership changes were registered in 1934/35 and 1940, then in 1954 the property passed to John Joseph Murray Redmond and Dorothy Eliza Redmond. It was the Redmonds who transferred the land to the Anglican Church in 1958, to develop as a boys' Church of England School, thus ending over a century of agricultural activity on this land.

Bald Hills remained predominantly a farming community until the second half of the 20th century, when many of the early farms were subdivided for residential settlement. Few 19th century farmhouses have survived, and of those which remain most have been substantially altered. The former farmhouse which is now used as the Administration Building of St Paul's Anglican School, is a rare surviving late 19th/early 20th century farmhouse in the Bald Hills district, and its site is associated with the earliest phase of non-indigenous settlement in the district. A tangible link with the early farm remains in the unsubdivided school grounds and its two early hoop pines.

== Description ==
The two hoop pines (Araucaria cunninghamii) are located within the grounds of St Paul's Anglican School, Strathpine Road, Bald Hills. They are situated at the end of the school's main driveway, framing the entrance to the school's Administration Building, which is a late 19th/early 20th century former farmhouse.

The older tree is approximately 25 metres (82 ft) high with a canopy diameter of approximately 27 metres (89 ft). The younger tree is approximately 18 metres (59 ft) high with a canopy diameter of approximately 22 metres (72 ft). Both trees have lost the upper trunk and canopy as a result of storm damage in the mid-1980s.

== Heritage listing ==
Hoop Pines was listed on the Queensland Heritage Register on 22 February 2002 having satisfied the following criteria.

The place is important in demonstrating the evolution or pattern of Queensland's history.

The hoop pines at St Paul's Anglican School, Bald Hills are indicative of the pattern of Queensland settlement, being associated with the evolution of non-indigenous settlement in the Moreton Bay district in the 1850s, and with the earliest development of the Bald Hills district in particular

The place demonstrates rare, uncommon or endangered aspects of Queensland's cultural heritage.

The larger of the two hoop pines is likely to pre-date non-indigenous settlement, and as remnant forest growth is rare surviving evidence of the valuable stands of hoop pine which made the Moreton Bay district so attractive for early colonial settlement, and which had been virtually removed from the Bald Hills district by the late 1860s. The two early hoop pines at St Paul's Anglican School are of horticultural interest and are rare specimens of trees of this age surviving in the Brisbane area.

The place is important because of its aesthetic significance.

The hoop pines have aesthetic significance for their landmark value on the ridge at Bald Hills.

The place has a strong or special association with a particular community or cultural group for social, cultural or spiritual reasons.

They also have a special association for the community of Bald Hills as evidence of the work of the Stewart family, who, together with their relatives the Duncans, were the first non-indigenous settlers in the area, and were instrumental in developing Bald Hills as an agricultural district supplying Brisbane and Sandgate; and for the community of St Paul's Anglican School as marking the administrative centre of the school.
