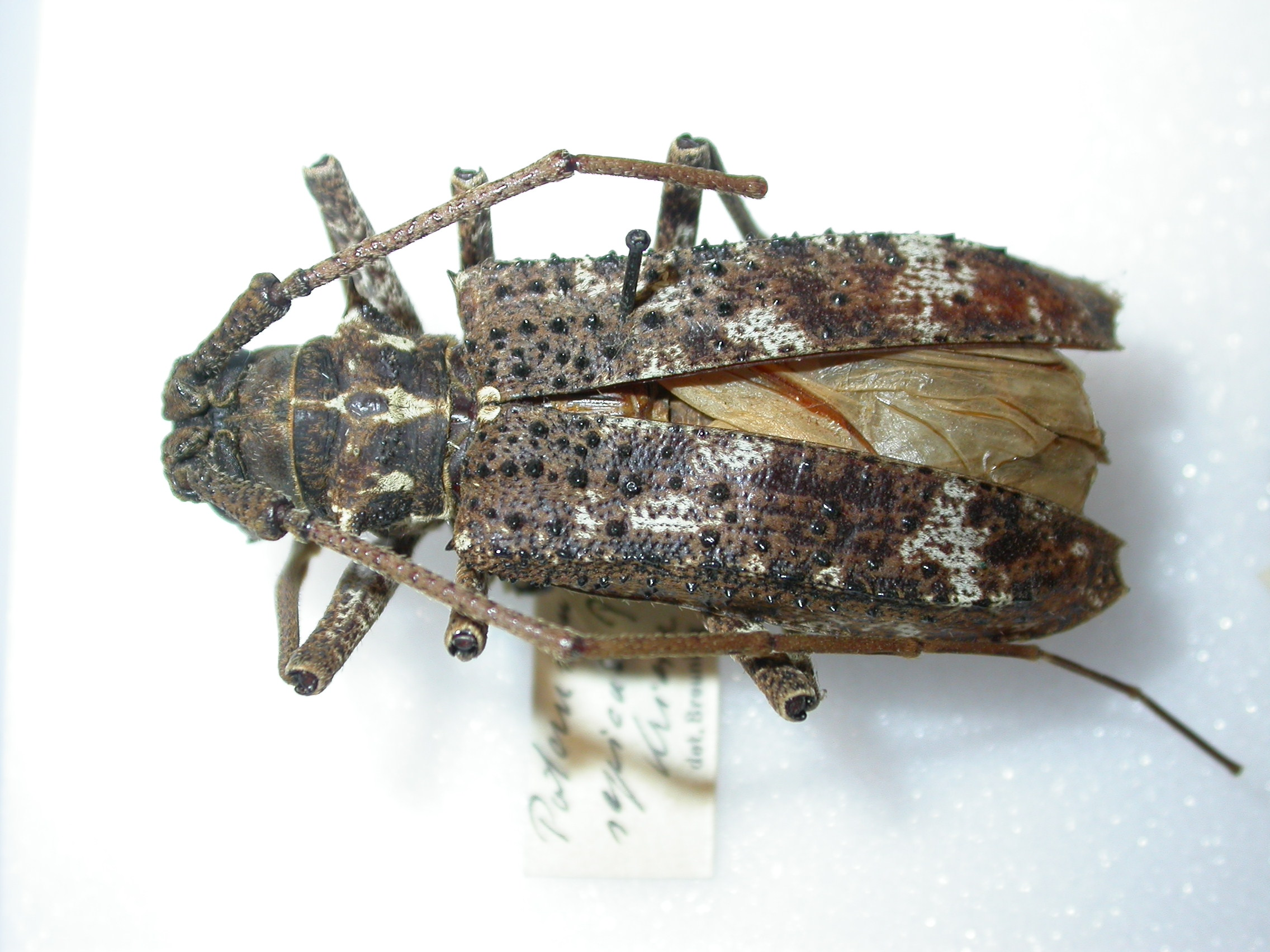

Scientific classification
- Kingdom: Animalia
- Phylum: Arthropoda
- Class: Insecta
- Order: Coleoptera
- Suborder: Polyphaga
- Infraorder: Cucujiformia
- Family: Cerambycidae
- Genus: Potemnemus
- Species: P. sepicanus

Binomial name
- Potemnemus sepicanus Kriesche, 1923

Synonyms
- Potemnemus hispidus Gressitt, 1952

= Potemnemus sepicanus =

Species of beetle

Potemnemus sepicanus is a species of beetle in the family Cerambycidae. It was described by Kriesche in 1923. It is known from Papua New Guinea.
