= Potemnemus ennevei =

Scientific classification
- Kingdom: Animalia
- Phylum: Arthropoda
- Class: Insecta
- Order: Coleoptera
- Suborder: Polyphaga
- Infraorder: Cucujiformia
- Family: Cerambycidae
- Genus: Potemnemus
- Species: P. ennevei

Binomial name
- Potemnemus ennevei de Jong, 1945

Species of beetle

Potemnemus ennevei is a species of beetle in the family Cerambycidae. It was described by de Jong in 1945. It is known from Indonesia.
