= Canterbury College (Waterford) =

Location
- Waterford, Brisbane, Queensland; Australia; 27°42′33″S 153°08′58″E

Information
- Type: Independent co-educational early learning, primary and secondary day school
- Motto: The Better Prepared The Stronger
- Denomination: Anglican
- Established: 1987; 39 years ago
- Head of College: Daniel Walker
- Grades: Prep–12
- Enrolment: c. 1,420
- Campus: 69 hectares (170 acres)
- Campus type: Suburban
- Colours: Red, navy blue and white
- Affiliation: The Associated Schools; The Junior Associated Schools (JTAS)
- Website: canterbury.qld.edu.au

Canterbury College is an independent Anglican co-educational early learning, primary and secondary day school, located in Waterford, an outer suburb of Brisbane, between Beenleigh and Loganlea near Woodlands, in Queensland, Australia.

Established in 1987, the college is located on 33 hectares (82 acres).

== History ==
Canterbury College was established in 1987, with seventy-three students in three classes in Years 6, 7 and 8. Student numbers have grown quickly and it now has an enrolment of 1,650 students, from Pre-Prep (Kindergarten) to Year Twelve.

== Academic results ==
In 2013, 27 per cent of eligible Year 12 students received an OP 1–5 and 99 per cent of applying students received a placement and are currently studying at University. The college's Years 3, 5 and 7 students all achieved at or well above State and National averages in the 2014 NAPLAN testing.

== School structure ==
On-campus university programs are available and Year 12 students are able to study a university subject while at school. The college's Year 7 program has been established in Middle School since 2004.

== See also ==
- List of schools in Queensland
- List of Anglican schools in Australia
