= St Paul's Anglican School, Bald Hills =

St Paul's School
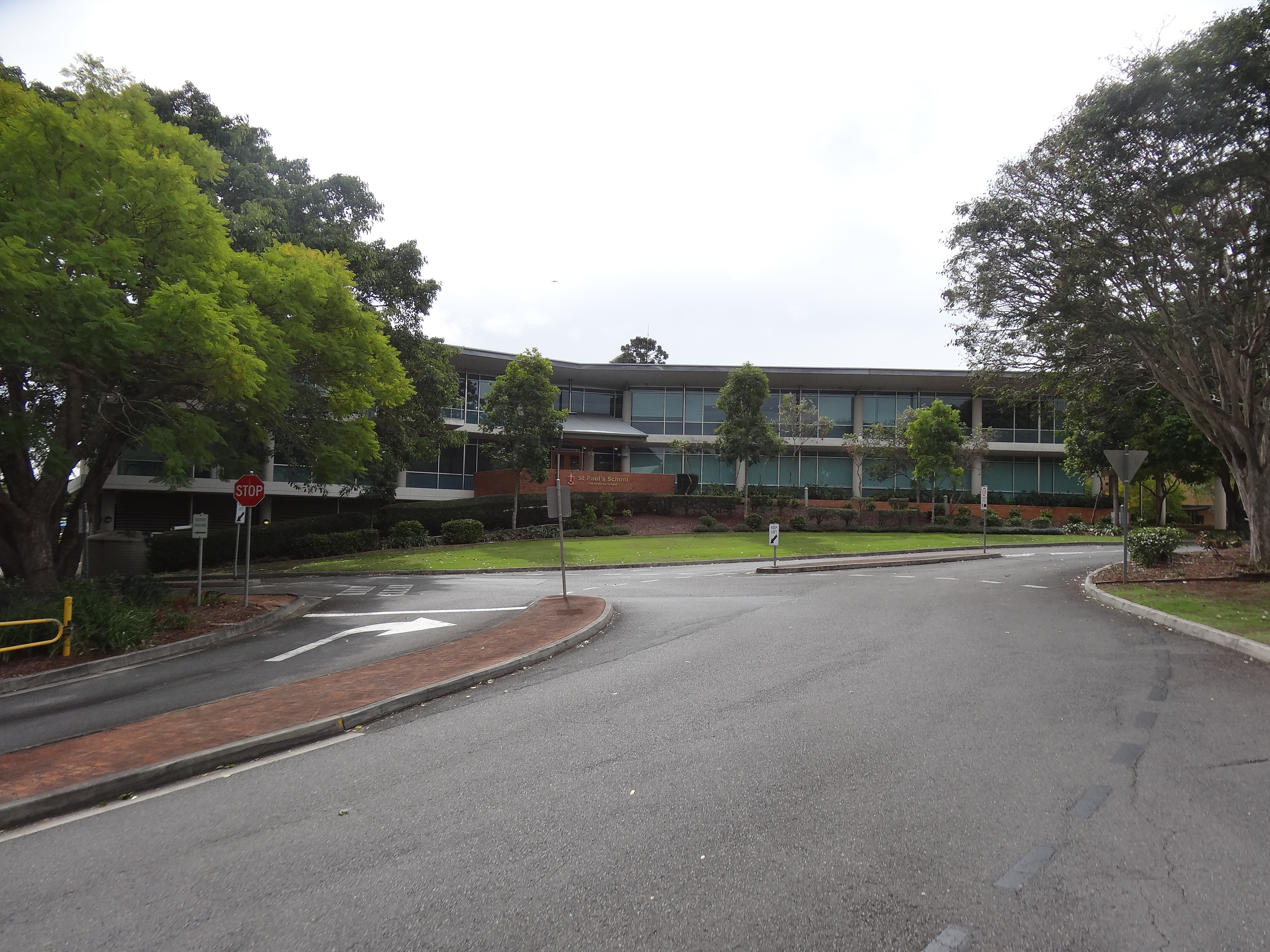
- Main entrance, 2023

Location
- Bald Hills, Brisbane, Queensland; Australia; 27°18′57″S 153°00′20″E

Information
- Type: Independent co-educational early learning, primary and secondary day school
- Motto: Latin: Fide et Literis (By Faith and By Learning)
- Religious affiliation: Anglican Diocese of Brisbane
- Denomination: Anglican
- Established: 31 January 1960; 66 years ago
- Principal: Mr John O'Sullivan Williams
- Years: Prep–12
- Enrolment: 1,300
- Area: 51 hectares (130 acres)
- Colours: Cardinal red and bottle green
- Slogan: Create your own story!
- Mascot: Paul the Puma
- Affiliation: Junior School Heads Association of Australia
- Website: www.stpauls.qld.edu.au

St Paul's Anglican School, Bald Hills, commonly known as St Paul's School is an independent Anglican co-educational early learning, primary and secondary day school located in the northern Brisbane suburb of Bald Hills, Queensland, Australia, bordering the Pine River and the City of Moreton Bay.

The school opened on 31 January 1960 and takes its name from St Paul's School in London. St. Paul's School offers an academic and technical education as well as a range of co-curricular activities.

== Leadership and sub-schools ==
St Paul's School's Principal is Mr John O'Sullivan Williams. Within the school there are 4 sub schools:

Pre-Prep	New to school	
Junior School	Prep to Year 6	
Senior School	Year 7 to Year 12	
International School	Provides education in Australia for international students	Director: Ms Kathleen Power

== Headmasters and principals ==
Time Period	Headmaster/Principal
1960–1978	Mr Peter Krebs
1979–2000	Mr Gilbert Case
2001–2007	Margaret Goddard
2007–2008	Patricia Evans
2008–15 September 2023	Dr Paul Browning
September 2023 – December 2025	Mr John O'Sullivan Williams

== History ==
In 1857 the site of the school was first settled by Scottish settlers. In 1859, the British colony of Queensland was founded. In 1886 the original wooden building, the Old Farmhouse, was built. It still stands today. On 13 February 1958 the Church of England acquired the property via a bequest from Sir Edwin Tooth for the "establishment of an all boys grammar school". The Anglican Archbishop of Brisbane, Reginald Halse, was a former student of St Paul’s School in London and named the school after the one in London. The school also adopted the London school's motto "Fide et Literis” (“By Faith and by Learning”).

The school opened on 31 January 1961 with a small staff of three and an enrolment of sixty-four boys between grades eight and twelve. Years later the school expanded its clientele and became fully co-educational. This allowed for a substantial increase in funds, which meant much-needed facilities could be built.

== Campus ==
=== Location ===
St Paul's Campus is located in Bald Hills, approximately 17 kilometres (11 mi) north of the Brisbane central business district. The school is situated on the bank of the South Pine River, on the border between the Brisbane City Council and Moreton Bay City Council. The area surrounding the school is a mix of residential and rural properties.

=== Grounds and facilities ===
The School occupies a single 51-hectare (130-acre) campus, which includes both the school's buildings as well as its sporting fields and grazing land. A pair of hoop pines which were originally planted in the 1850s are now heritage-listed.

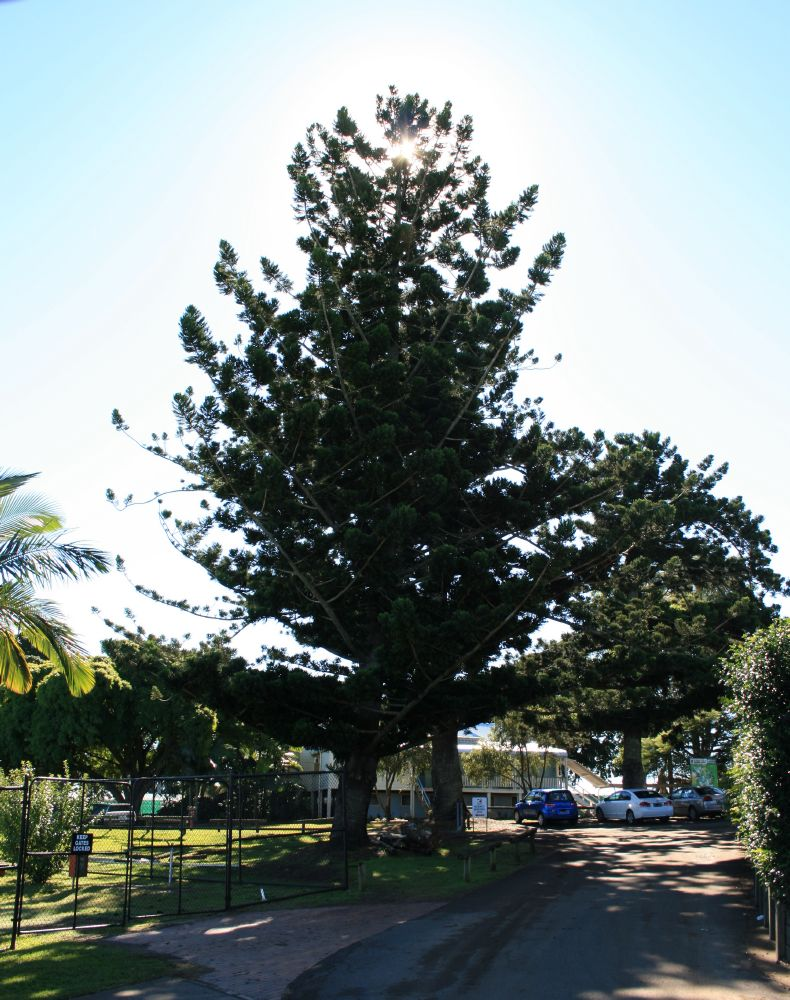
Heritage-listed pine trees at the school, 2009

Many of the buildings on the school campus are 40 years old. More modern facilities include the School Chapel, the Music Centre, the Middle School, the renovated Design/Technology building, the Geise Library and the new Science Laboratories. Construction was recently completed on the new Sutton Building, which replaced the old building of the same name at the beginning of 2012. It includes the school's first café – Sippers@Suttons as well as English classrooms and the international school.

The original blocks 1 & 2 used for Language classes, Food Technology and Computer Studies of the school are currently under revision.

== Sports ==
TAS (The Associated Schools) Sports The St Paul's Anglican School sporting program is centred on membership of:

- The Associated Schools (TAS) for students in Years 7–12, and
- Junior TAS Competition (JTAS) for students in Years 4–6, the premier co-educational sporting associations of South East Queensland.

The School participates in TAS & JTAS Saturday Sporting fixtures over 3 trimesters. Each trimester is approximately nine weeks. The School also participates in Interschool Carnivals in Swimming, Cross-country and Athletics.

== House system ==
Prior to 2017, the St. Paul's School house system consisted of ten secondary school houses and four junior school houses. The secondary school houses were Arnott, Baker, Gartside, Grindrod, Halse, Ivor Church, Stewart, Strong, Sutton, and Tooth, whereas the junior school houses were Rudd, Ingpen, Klein, and Theile. However, in late 2016, it was decided to establish a set of new houses across the entire school, based on elements of the school crest (Shield, Sword, Mitre, Crown, and Scroll) and to abolish the former junior school house system altogether. The new houses are:

Founded	House	Head of House
2017	Boek	Lisa Bolger
2017	Gladius	Neil White
2017	Mitre	David Fenwick
2017	Scudo	Sophie Hughes
2017	Taja	Andrew Wilson

== Sexual abuse ==
In 2003, St Paul's School was the subject of intense public scrutiny after former students stated that they had been abused by Kevin Lynch, a staff member employed at the time. Lynch was employed as a school counsellor at Brisbane Grammar School during the 1970s and 1980s, and subsequently at St Paul's School. The students claimed that they were tortured, hypnotised and required to perform sexual acts for Lynch, and alleged that they had told St Paul's School staff about Lynch's activities, but were ignored. In 1997, shortly after having been charged with the sexual abuse of students at Brisbane Grammar School and St Paul's, Lynch committed suicide.

== Notable alumni ==
- Peter Dutton – 1987 – House of Representatives former member for Dickson
- Steven Miles – 1993 – Former Queensland Premier
- Ben Tune – 1993 – Queensland Reds & Australia national rugby union team player
- Rod Welford – former Queensland Minister for Education, Training and the Arts, and Attorney-General; former member for the Queensland state electoral district of Everton

== See also ==
- List of schools in Queensland
- List of Anglican schools in Australia
