= Cannon Hill Anglican College =

Location
- Cannon Hill, Queensland; Australia; 27°27′39.02″S 153°05′12.01″E

Information
- Type: Independent co-educational day school
- Motto: Courage And Compassion
- Religious affiliations: Anglican Diocese of Brisbane; Anglican Schools Office
- Denomination: Anglican
- Established: 1989; 37 years ago
- Principal: Gary O'Brien
- Chaplain: Bro. Nathan James
- Years: Prep to Year 12
- Enrolment: 1,349 (2025)
- Campus: Urban
- Area: 11.5 hectares (28 acres)
- Colours: Red, navy blue and white
- Affiliation: The Associated Schools
- Website: www.chac.qld.edu.au

Cannon Hill Anglican College (commonly known as CHAC) is an independent Anglican co-educational day school in the suburb of Cannon Hill, Brisbane, located in the state of Queensland, Australia.

== History ==
The College, originally called Cannon Hill College, opened in 1989 with 79 students and three buildings. In 1994, it became an Anglican school in the diocese of Brisbane, changing its name to Cannon Hill Anglican College to reflect this. The school has had five principals: Rod Wells (the founder of the college), Suzanne Bain, Greg Wain, Robyn Bell and Gary O'Brien, who currently holds the role. Currently, the school caters for Prep to Year 12, with upwards of approximately 1,000 students, and is a co-educational school. From 30 March until 22 May, full-scale operations were interrupted due to the coronavirus pandemic and under advice from the Queensland Government. Regular schooling was resumed on 25 May, after a slow reintroduction of senior students back to the college.

== Facilities ==
The College has a number of modern facilities, including an 1,100-seat auditorium, a design and technology workshop, a product design studio, a graphic design studio, and a research centre. A new science facility has also been constructed on the west side of the school. Its sporting facilities support basketball, cricket, hockey, netball, rugby, football (soccer), touch football, tennis, athletics, and volleyball.

Most noteworthy of the College's facilities are its integrated arts facility, which incorporates a visual arts wing and lecture theatre; a music centre with sound-proof teaching studios (including the professional recording studio Ghostgum Audio); an orchestral recording studio; and dedicated drama studios.

== Houses ==
CHAC's houses are all named after islands in Moreton Bay. Initially, there were only four houses: Moreton, Peel, Saint Helena and Stradbroke. In 2001, two new houses, Macleay and Russell, were added.

Each house has an official mascot, chosen from animals, groups, characters or civilisations beginning with the first letter of its name. Prior to 2024, they were referred to as the Macleay Magpies, Moreton Manta Rays, Peel Pirates, Russell Raiders, Saint Helena Spartans and Stradbroke Superheroes. Towards the end of that year, as part of their legacy gift to the college, the Year 12 graduates changed some of the houses' mascots to represent Oceanian wildlife: Peel became the Peel Pelicans; Russell, the Russell Roos (short for kangaroos); Saint Helena, the Saint Helena Snakes; and Stradbroke, the Stradbroke Sharks. Matching artwork was designed for each house, in collaboration with Indigenous artist Ambrose Killian.

House	Colour	Mascot	Island
Macleay	Black & White	Magpie	Macleay Island
Moreton	Yellow	Manta Ray	Moreton Island
Peel	Blue	Pelican	Peel Island
Russell	Orange	Kangaroo (roo)	Russell Island
Saint Helena	Green	Snake	Saint Helena Island
Stradbroke	Red	Shark	Stradbroke Island

== Notable alumni ==
- Seja Vogel, graduated 1998, keyboardist for Sekiden and Regurgitator
- Renee Coffey, graduated 1999, member of the Australian House of Representatives for Griffith
- Rachael Watson, graduated 2009, Australian Paralympic gold medallist and Paralympic 50-metre freestyle S4 world record holder
- Matt McGuire, graduated 2010, drummer for The Chainsmokers
- Jem Cassar-Daley, graduated 2018, singer-songwriter

== See also ==
- List of schools in Queensland
- List of Anglican schools in Australia
