= Potemnemus kaszabi =

Scientific classification
- Kingdom: Animalia
- Phylum: Arthropoda
- Class: Insecta
- Order: Coleoptera
- Suborder: Polyphaga
- Infraorder: Cucujiformia
- Family: Cerambycidae
- Genus: Potemnemus
- Species: P. kaszabi

Binomial name
- Potemnemus kaszabi (Breuning, 1973)

Synonyms
- Spinopotemnemus kaszabi Breuning, 1973

Species of beetle

Potemnemus kaszabi is a species of beetle in the family Cerambycidae. It was described by Stephan von Breuning in 1973.
