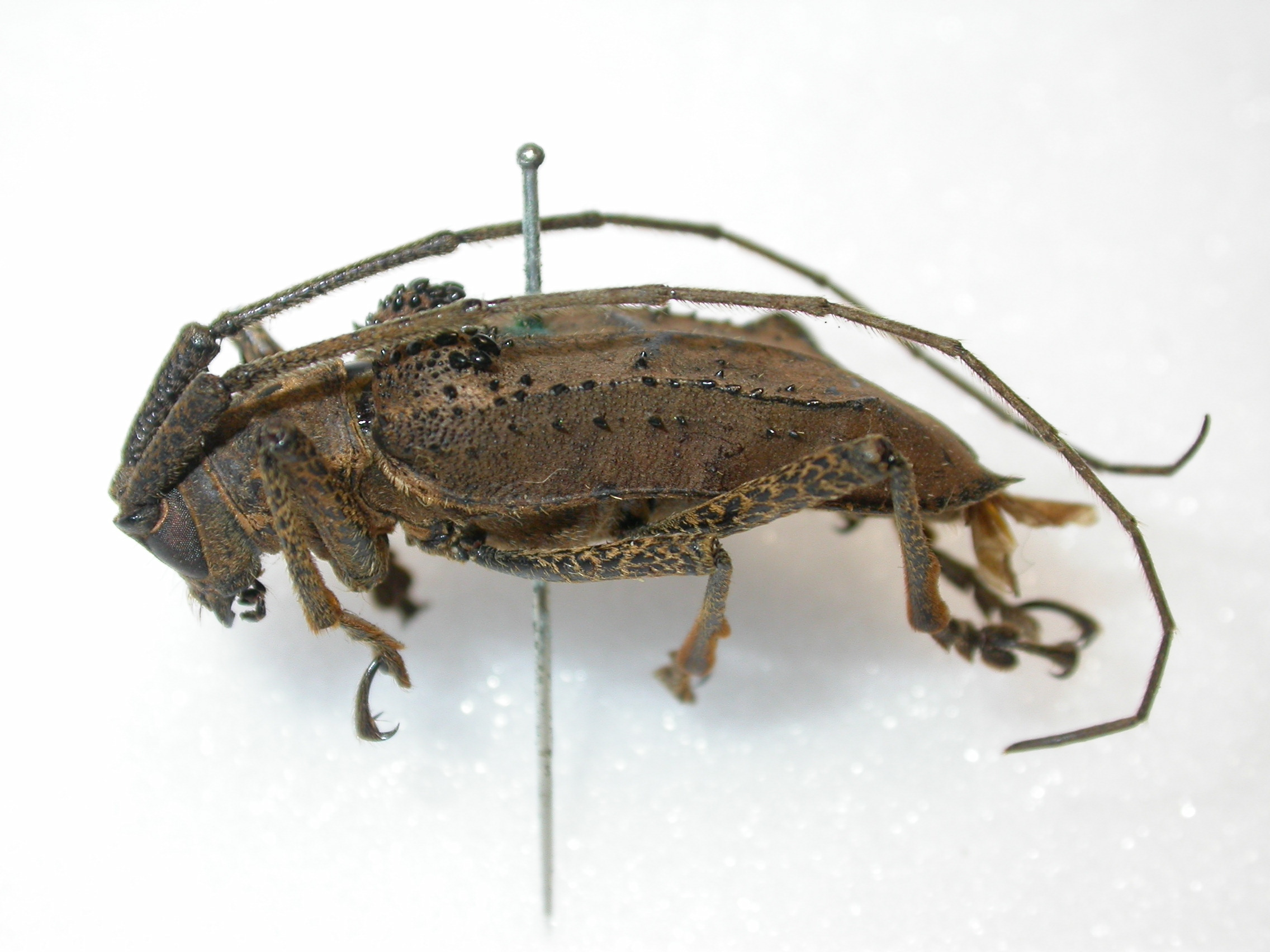
- Potemnemus tuberifer beetle

Scientific classification
- Kingdom: Animalia
- Phylum: Arthropoda
- Class: Insecta
- Order: Coleoptera
- Suborder: Polyphaga
- Infraorder: Cucujiformia
- Family: Cerambycidae
- Genus: Potemnemus
- Species: P. tuberifer

Binomial name
- Potemnemus tuberifer Gahan, 1894

= Potemnemus tuberifer =

Species of beetle

Potemnemus tuberifer is a species of beetle in the family Cerambycidae. It was described by Charles Joseph Gahan in 1894. It is known from Indonesia.
