= Scots PGC College =

The Scots PGC College

Location
- Warwick, Queensland; Australia; 28°12′42″S 152°02′47″E

Information
- Type: Independent, co-educational, day & boarding
- Motto: Always Aiming Higher
- Denomination: Uniting Church
- Established: 1918
- Chairman: Martin Webb
- Principal: Kyle Thompson
- Enrolment: 450 (P–12)
- Colours: Red, green and white
- Slogan: Where country values inspire excellence
- Website: www.scotspgc.qld.edu.au

The Scots PGC College is an independent, co-educational, Uniting Church, day and boarding school, located in Warwick, Queensland, Australia. The College currently caters for approximately 450 international and Australian students from Prep to year 12, including 180 boarders.

Located on two campuses, the College is currently divided into three age-based 'Learning Precincts' - a Junior School, a Middle School and a Senior School. In 2008, a new Performing Arts Center was opened to cater specifically for Drama and Music.

The Scots PGC College is a member of the Junior School Heads Association of Australia and The Associated Schools.

== History ==
The Presbyterian Girls' College, Warwick and The Scots College were established as boarding schools for girls and boys in 1918 and 1919 respectively. B. T. DeConlay, R. J. Shilliday, and W. R. Black, were founders of a school to serve the needs of the large Scottish population and provide a solid Presbyterian education. The founding head of the girls' college was Constance Mackness who led the school until 1949. Mackness had been working at the Presbyterian Ladies' College, Pymble. She gave the girls' school the motto of E labore dulcedo ("Sweetness Out of Labour") from her McInnes clan. Mackness was a writer of fiction set in girls' schools. Her books included "The Glad School". She was known for her expectation that her students had good intentions.

The two separate schools were amalgamated in 1970, and this new co-educational school was named The Scots PGC College. Scots PGC became a school of the Uniting Church in 1977, following Church union.

1995 saw the College Council move to adopt a new school badge designed by Neil Bonnell (Principal from 1985 to 1994), and a new school motto, "Always Aiming Higher". Prior to this the badges and mottos of both the original schools were used. The mottos were "Semper Petens Alta" ("Always Aiming Higher") for the boys, and "E Labore Dulcedo" for the girls.

In 2018 student Dolly Everett committed suicide rather than return to the school and endure more bullying, leading to calls for a national anti-bullying campaign. Many former students were recorded as saying that bullying at the school had been endemic since the 1980s.

== Uniform ==
The Clan Cameron of Erracht Tartan is the basis of the College uniform.

== Boarding houses ==
The boy boarders are divided into two boarding houses:

- Cunningham House
- Hawkins House

Girls' boarding is located at the Locke St Campus.

== House system ==
The school's house system is based on four different clans:

- Cameron – Red
- Leslie – Purple
- Macinnes – Gold
- Mackay – Green

Sporting competitions within the College are conducted in inter-clan (inter-house) format, in the three core sports of swimming, cross-country running and athletics. The inter-clan competition is also conducted in the majority of team sports played at the College.

== Pipe band ==
In line with its Scottish heritage, the College has a pipe band.

Students may join the Pipe Band from the age of 9, with lessons available for interested students from year 3 onwards. The bands compete at various Highland Gatherings in the South-East corner of Queensland, as well as at State and National Championships.

The College Pipes and Drums had the privilege and honour of providing musical support for the ANZAC Day Dawn Service at Villers-Bretonneux, France in 2013, in addition to other ANZAC Commemorations across Europe.

In 2002, the Scots PGC Pipe Band opened the Australia versus Scotland rugby union test match at Ballymore, and in May 2003 and 2007 opened the Polocrosse World Cup at Morgan Park.

== Notable alumni ==
- Emily Bass – Broncos NRLW player
- Dolly Everett – Died by Suicide as result of bullying
- Laura Geitz – captain Australian Diamonds Netball team and Queensland Firebirds team
- Benjamin Rigby – Australian actor

== See also ==
- List of schools in Queensland
- List of boarding schools
- Education in Australia
- List of pipe bands
