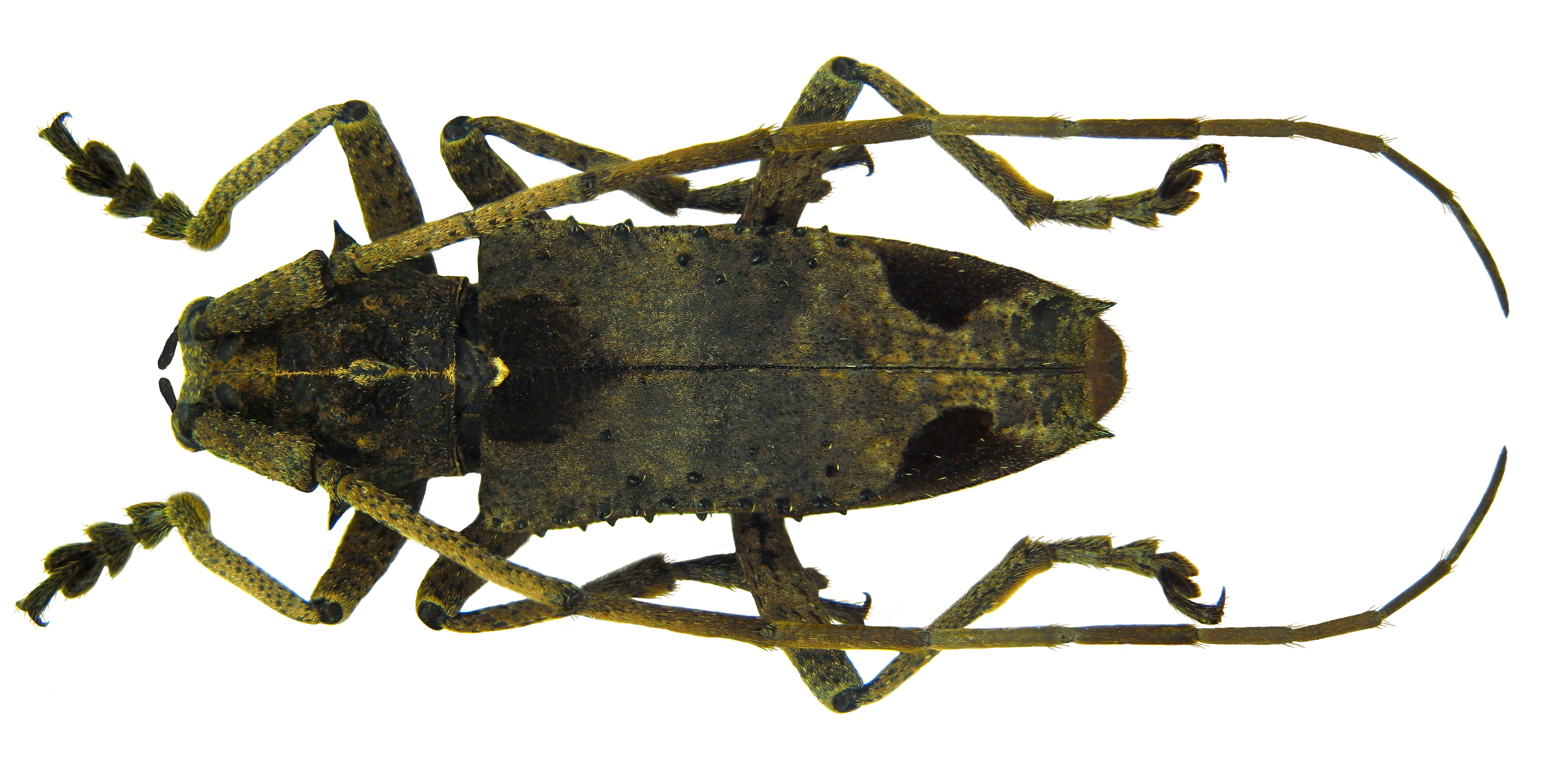

Scientific classification
- Kingdom: Animalia
- Phylum: Arthropoda
- Clade: Pancrustacea
- Class: Insecta
- Order: Coleoptera
- Suborder: Polyphaga
- Infraorder: Cucujiformia
- Family: Cerambycidae
- Genus: Potemnemus
- Species: P. scabrosus

Binomial name
- Potemnemus scabrosus (Olivier, 1790)

Synonyms
- Cerambyx scabrosus Olivier, 1790; Potemnemus loriai Breuning, 1956; Potemnemus trituberculatus Breuning, 1944; Protemnemus scabrosus (Olivier, 1790); Cerambix scabrosus Olivier, 1790 (misspelling)

= Potemnemus scabrosus =

Species of beetle

Potemnemus scabrosus is a species of beetle in the family Cerambycidae. It was described by Guillaume-Antoine Olivier in 1790. It is known from Papua New Guinea and Indonesia.
