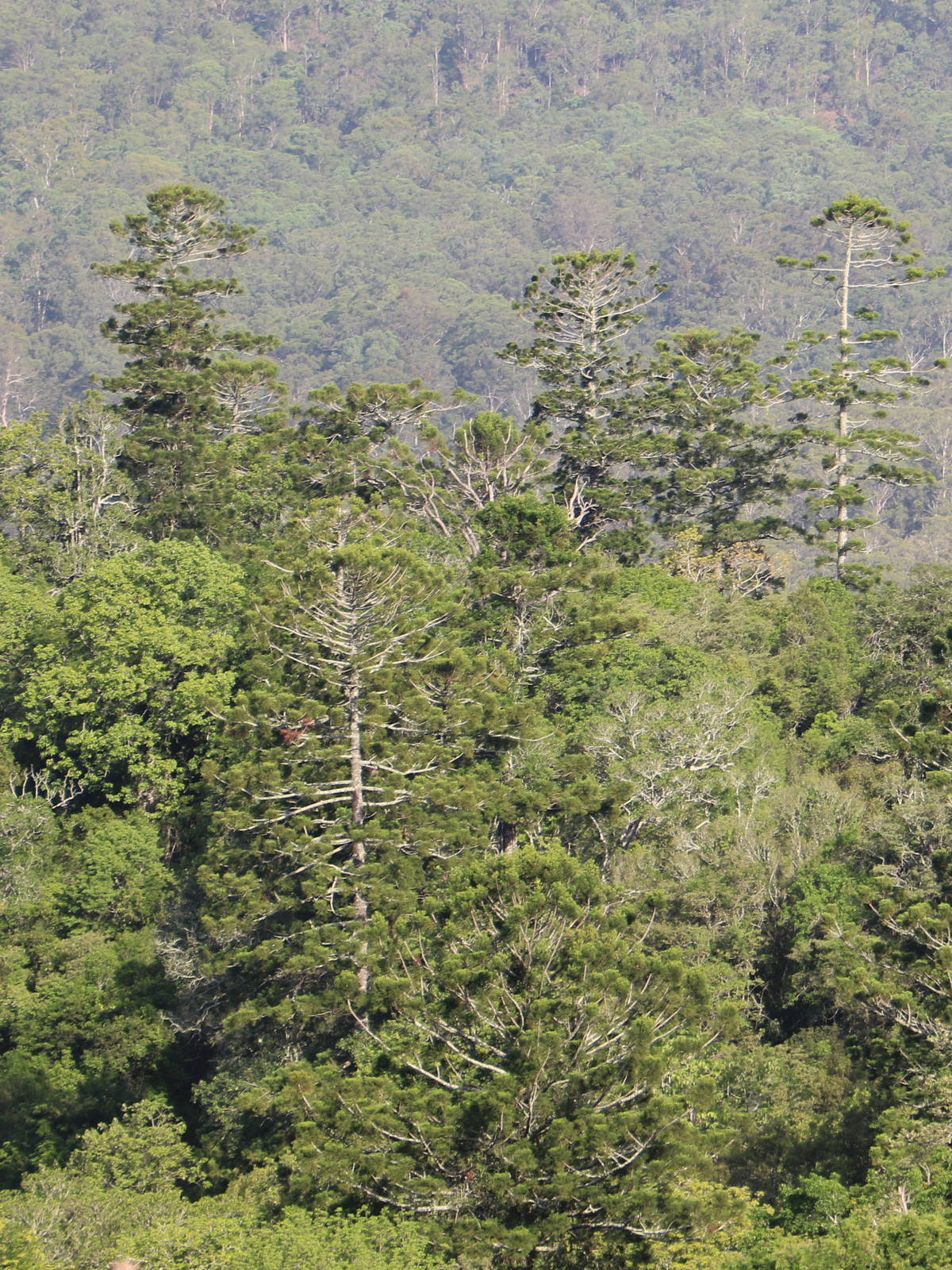

Conservation status
- Least Concern (IUCN 3.1)

Scientific classification
- Kingdom: Plantae
- Clade: Tracheophytes
- Clade: Gymnosperms
- Division: Pinophyta
- Class: Pinopsida
- Order: Araucariales
- Family: Araucariaceae
- Genus: Araucaria
- Section: A. sect. Eutacta
- Species: A. cunninghamii

Binomial name
- Araucaria cunninghamii Mudie

Synonyms
- Altingia cunninghamii (Mudie) Corrie; Eutassa cunninghamii (Mudie) G.Don; Eutacta cunninghamii (Mudie) Link

= Araucaria cunninghamii =

Species of pine tree in Australia

Araucaria cunninghamii is a species of conifer in the family Araucariaceae, known as hoop pine. Other less commonly used names include colonial pine, Queensland pine, Dorrigo pine, Moreton Bay pine and Richmond River pine. The scientific name honours the botanist and explorer Allan Cunningham, who collected the first specimens in the 1820s. It is the earliest-diverging extant lineage within the genus Araucaria, and the only species within section Eutacta native to continental mainland areas; all other species in the section are naturally confined to islands.

== Description ==
The leaves on young trees are awl-shaped, 1–2 cm long, about 2 mm thick at the base, and scale-like, incurved, 1–2 cm long and 4 mm broad on mature trees. The cones are ovoid, 8–10 cm long and 6–8 cm diameter, and take about 18 months to mature. They disintegrate at maturity to release the nut-like edible seeds.

== Subspecies ==
There are two varieties:

- Araucaria cunninghamii var. cunninghamii – Australia, from northeast New South Wales to east-central Queensland, at 0–1,000 m elevation.
- Araucaria cunninghamii var. papuana – New Guinea, on the mountains of Papua New Guinea, and in Irian Jaya, Indonesia, at 100–2,700 m elevation.

== Habitat ==
The species is found in the dry rainforests of New South Wales and Queensland and in New Guinea. The trees can live up to 450 years and grow to a height of 60 metres. The bark is rough, splits naturally, and peels easily.

Examples of the species can be found on ridges and mountaintops in Queensland's North Burnett region (sometimes in quantity where dry rainforests remain – such as on the summit of Mount Perry and on ridges north of Mount Walsh National Park), inland from Gympie in the Wide Bay, and also at lower elevations around homesteads, where the trees may possibly have been retained for aesthetic value. An example can be seen off the road to the lookout above the town of Mount Perry and a number of trees line the approach to the town from Gin Gin.

== Cultivation and other uses ==
The wood is a high-quality timber that is particularly important to the plywood industry and also used for furniture, veneer, joinery, panelling, particle board, flooring and boats. Most natural stands in Australia and Papua New Guinea have been depleted by logging. It is now mainly found on timber plantations; however, the species continues to thrive in protected areas, including Lamington National Park where at least one walking track is named after it.

Aboriginal Australians used the resin as cement.

=== Pests ===
The plantations in Queensland have been subject to damage by a native rat species, Rattus tunneyi, which digs to the roots of a semi-mature tree and kills it. The animal was declared a pest for this reason. The vulnerability of A. cunninghamii plantations to pest losses has caused some of them to be replaced by A. hunsteinii, which suffers less in plantation. Unspecified Microlepidoptera are significant pests of the pinecones of both. (Note: p. 391, 4.5. Insect pests of Araucaria species in New Guinea A number of as yet unidentified members of the Microlepidoptera also cause much wastage in cones of A. cunninghamii and A. hunsteinii.")

==== Biological control ====
Cryptolaemus montrouzieri is a coccinellid predator of mealybug and soft scale insect parasites of A. cunninghamii, and has several characteristics that make it a good biocontrol for use in plantations. Although they are less interested in other trees – by many multiples – C. montrouzieri does hunt the same pests in custard apple and citrus plantations.

== Gallery ==
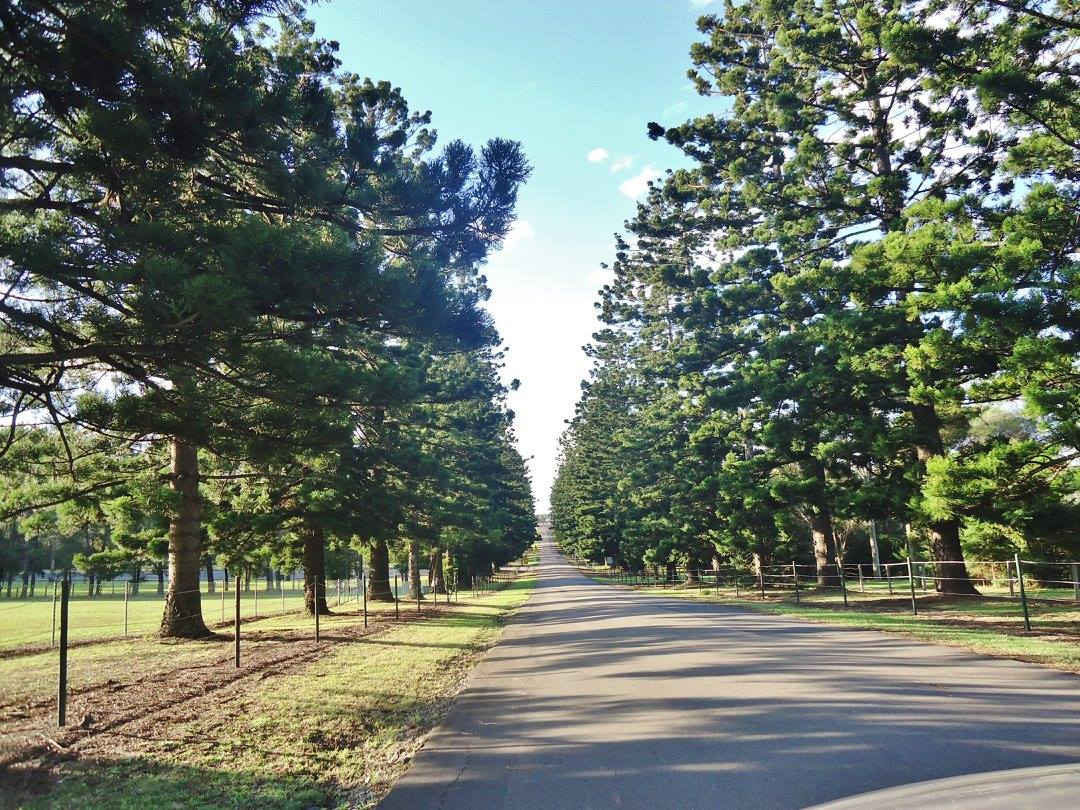
Hoop pine in Prospect Reservoir in Sydney

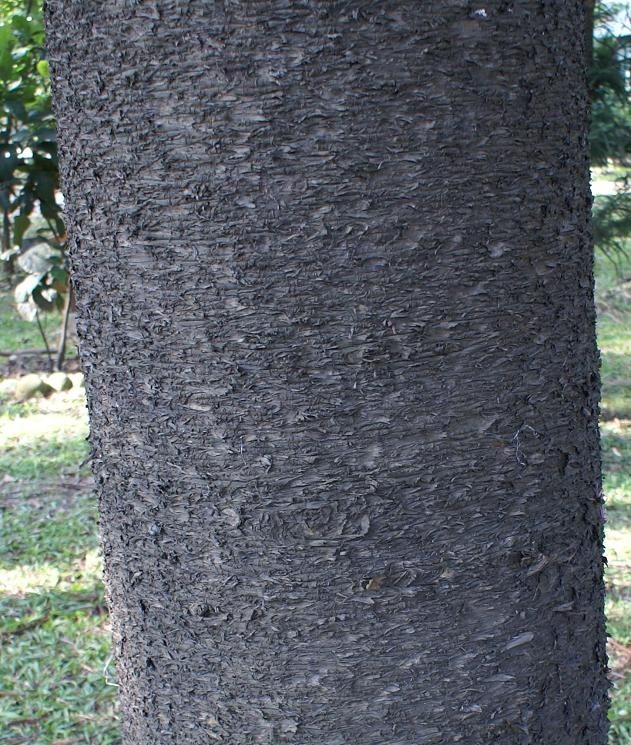
The banded bark of Araucaria cunninghamii

== See also ==
Hoop Pines, Bald Hills
