= John Paul College (Brisbane) =

Location
- Daisy Hill, Logan, Queensland; Australia; 27°38′S 153°09′E

Information
- Type: Independent, early learning, primary, and secondary day and boarding school
- Motto: Unity; Christ; Learning
- Religious affiliation: Ecumenical
- Denomination: Non-denominational Christianity
- Established: 1982; 44 years ago
- Principal: Craig Merritt
- Years: Early learning and K–12
- Enrolment: 1,711 (2018)
- Campus size: 33 hectares (82 acres)
- Campus type: Suburban
- Colours: Burgundy and blue
- Newspaper: Burgundy + Blue
- Affiliation: The Associated Schools
- Website: www.jpc.qld.edu.au

John Paul College is an independent, non-denominational Christian early learning, primary, and secondary day and boarding school, located in the Logan City suburb of Daisy Hill, Queensland, Australia.

Established in 1982, the school enrolled 1,711 students in 2018, from early learning and Year K to Year 12, of whom two percent identified as Indigenous Australians and 24 percent came from a language background other than English. John Paul International College provides English Language Studies for international students keen to engage in study in Australia.

The principal is Craig Merritt. The school is located on a 33-hectare (82-acre) campus, and is a member of The Associated Schools.

== Overview ==
The foundation principal was Cec Munns, who was also a member of the steering committee which had urged the Brisbane Catholic Education Office to establish a Catholic secondary school in the area. This request was denied, so the committee worked with the local Catholic, Anglican, and Uniting parishes to establish the school, which opened on Australia Day 1982 with 144 students in Years 8 and 9.

John Paul College has twice been judged as one of the best ten schools in Australia in a nationwide series conducted by The Australian newspaper in both 2002 and 2003.

John Paul provides group or private instrumental, vocal, dance, and drama lessons on a weekly basis.

== Organization ==
The College comprises three schools:

Primary School	Childcare to Year 6
Senior School	Year 7 to Year 12
International College	Assists international students with the English language

Primary school is broken down into an additional three schools:

- Early Learning (childcare, kindergarten and prep)
- Junior Primary (Years 1, 2 and 3)
- Senior Primary (Years 4, 5 and 6)

== History ==
The college was founded through the collaborative efforts of four clergymen from three different denominations: Roman Catholic, Anglican, and Uniting. All four were strong believers in ecumenism, which continues to guide the College ethos to this day.

Father Rollo Enright, the Catholic parish priest at St Peter's, Rochedale, had a strong commitment to ecumenism and was the driving force behind the push for the ecumenical concept of the college when it became clear that the proposal to build a Catholic College at Daisy Hill was rejected by the Catholic Education Office. Father Leo Burke was the founding Catholic parish priest of St Edward's, Daisy Hill and remains involved with the college to this day as its patron. Another ecumenist, Patrick Doulin, was parish priest of St Mark's Anglican community, Slacks Creek, and the official representative of the Anglican hierarchy. Reverend Bryan Gilmour, the pastor of Logan Uniting Church, was a prominent leader of the ecumenical movement within his own Church and, with the others, enthusiastically supported the establishment of John Paul College as an ecumenical school. It was indeed, he who when it appeared all avenues to establish the college were exhausted, suggested that the founders pray that, "not our will, but God's, be done".

== Houses ==
Students are allocated to one of the four houses and will remain in that house for the duration of their time at JPC. Siblings are assigned to the same house.

House	Colour
Gilmour	Blue
Burke	Red
Doulin	Green
Enright	White

== Boarding ==
JPC offers accommodation for students in Years 7 to 12. The boarders are housed in a "village-style" environment called Fenton Village. Vegetable gardens surround individual residential homes, which accommodates eight boarders each. The Director of Boarding, Assistant Director of Boarding, House Mother and four Tutors live on-site.

== Notable alumni ==
=== Sports ===
Olympians

- Genevieve LaCaze
- Mitch Larkin
- Keryn McMaster
- Ki Sung-yueng
- Michael Turnball

Association football

- Ki Sung-yueng
- Michael Turnball

Australian rules footballers

- Shaun Hampson
- Jesse Tawhiao-Wardlaw
- Jesse White

Men's basketball

- Tim Coenraad
- Tyrell Harrison
- Rhys Martin
- Cameron Tragardh

Women's basketball

- Maddison Allen
- Mikhaela Donnelly
- Sarah Graham
- Kalani Purcell
- Kristy Wallace

Netball

- Madeline McAuliffe
- Clare McMeniman
- Laura Scherian

Rugby union

- Jake Schatz

=== Others ===
- Raghe Abdi – Somali-Australian terrorist.
- Yassmin Abdel-Magied – Sudanese-Australian mechanical engineer.
- David Baxby – CEO, Virgin Management Asia Pacific.
- Renee Gracie – Adult film actress and racing driver
- Gong Hyo-jin – South Korean actress.
- Dami Im – South Korean-born Australian singer.
- Taj Pabari – 2017 Queensland Young Australian of the Year.

== See also ==
- List of schools in Queensland
- Education in Australia
- Ecumenism
