= Ormiston College =

Location
- Brisbane, Queensland; Australia; 27°30′48.88″S 153°14′48.70″E

Information
- Type: Independent
- Motto: Seek to Achieve
- Established: 1988; 38 years ago
- Headmaster: Michael Hornby
- Years offered: ELC–12
- Enrolment: 1513 (2024)
- Campus: Ormiston
- Colours: Maroon & blue
- Website: www.ormistoncollege.com.au/

Ormiston College, located in Redland City, Queensland, Australia, is an independent, co-educational, non-denominational Christian school, for students from Prep to year 12, and is best known for its sporting achievements.

== History ==
Ormiston College opened in 1988. Ormiston College Limited, a non-profit, public company, was formed to develop the school and the Board of Directors was established to assist in the administration of the College. Over time, additional land was purchased and facilities were built. The school expanded to include a Senior School (starting from year 8) in 1991, Pre-school (Prep) in 2000 and the Early Learning Centre (Childcare Centre) in 2007.

In 2021, the college won the 2021 Library Design Award for School Libraries from the Australian Library and Information Association.

== Campus expansion controversy ==
In May 2026, Ormiston College began staged vegetation clearing for an approved campus expansion project, including new sporting ovals, an aquatic centre and administrative buildings. The works involved the removal of around 650 trees, which formed significant koala habitat. Redland City Council estimated around 350–500 koalas lived in the area planned to be cleared.

The project attracted public opposition from environmental groups, residents and protesters, who raised concerns about the loss of koala habitat and impacts on wildlife movement corridors. Tree clearing was temporarily halted after a koala was found in a tree marked for removal. During the protest, former Greens candidate Kristie Lockhart was arrested after allegedly crossing barriers to alert workers to the koala sighting. During the controversy, graffiti reading "Leave koalas alone" was written at the front of the school.

Ormiston College stated that it would offset the removal of koala habitat by planting 526 new trees as part of its koala management and revegetation plans.

== Notable alumni ==
- Shayna Jack, Olympic medal-winning swimmer
- Mirusia Louwerse, ARIA-topping soprano singer
- Clare Nott, Paralympic medal-winning wheelchair basketball player

== See also ==
- List of schools in Queensland
