= West Moreton Anglican College =

School in Queensland, Australia

Information
- Established: c. 1855
- Principal: Andrew Peach
- Grades: Prep–Year 12
- Enrollment: 1,466 (2023)
- Website: https://www.wmac.com.au/

West Moreton Anglican College (WMAC) is an independent Anglican co-educational primary and secondary school located in the Ipswich suburb of Karrabin, Queensland, Australia. It is administered by the Anglican Schools Commission, with an enrolment of 1,466 students and a teaching staff of 106, as of 2023. The school serves students from Prep to Year 12, and is affiliated with the Anglican Church of Australia, specifically the Anglican Diocese of Brisbane.

== History ==
The school opened on 1 January 1994, being built upon the foundations of St Paul's Day school, opened in 1855, before being expanded by the parishioners of St Paul's Church to offer co-educational facilities. Founded by Reverend Canon Gavin Ott and Dr. Hugh Bartholomeusz, the school originally boasted thirty-eight hectares of land, including a dam and fertile farmland. Later, the school expanded to 44 hectares after acquiring land.

On 6 February 1994, the Governor General at the time, Bill Hayden, officially opened the school.

== Houses ==
The student body is divided into five houses, with each named after an Australian poet. These are Gilmore, Lawson, Mackellar, Paterson and Wright.

== Notable alumni ==
- Hazza, singer and television presenter
- Kate Lutkins, Australian rules footballer
- Demsey McKean, professional boxer

== See also ==
- List of Schools in Greater Brisbane
