= Redeemer Lutheran College =

Location
- Brisbane, Queensland; Australia; 27°35′04″S 153°07′23″E

Information
- Type: Private primary and secondary school
- Motto: Latin: Spes nostra in Christo est (Our hope is in Christ)
- Religious affiliation: Lutheranism
- Denomination: Lutheran Church of Australia
- Established: 1980; 46 years ago
- Principal: Darrin Schumacher
- Years: Prep to 12
- Enrolment: ~1108
- Campus: Rochedale
- Colours: Three shades of blue, white and gold
- Affiliations: The Associated Schools; Junior School Heads Association of Australia
- Website: www.redeemer.com.au

Redeemer Lutheran College is a co-educational Lutheran primary and secondary school in Rochedale, Brisbane, Queensland, Australia. Founded in 1980 by Robin Kleinschmidt OAM and other Lutherans, the College educates students from years Prep to 12.

The College motto is ‘Spes Nostra in Christo Est’, which translates to, ‘Our Hope is in Christ’.

Principal Darrin Schumacher began his tenure in January 2025 and is Redeemer’s 6th principal.

== Location and grounds ==
Redeemer is on the southern outskirts of Brisbane, bordering Logan City. The semi-rural environment of its early years is now zoned for housing developments. The creation of nearby estates boosted Rochedale’s population by 140.4% between the 2017 and 2021 Census reporting periods, and is continuing to grow.

The College campus has continued to retain an emphasis on leafy surrounds and open space. The 2018 Master Plan, developed with architects Fulton Trotter, maintained a commitment to restricting buildings to two stories in height.

A new master plan is expected to be released in 2026.

Building program

Redeemer Lutheran College has invested heavily in its built environment in recent years.

New buildings opened since 2022 include:

- Hospitality training precinct, with a commercial café and commercial kitchen for student training
- Innovation Hub with dedicated physics, biology and chemistry labs, technology and engineering classrooms, a film and TV production studio, digital technologies lab, art studio, flexible learning areas and a student café.

The Innovation Hub reflects the principles of the Alice Springs Declaration 2019, which recognises young people need access to an education that promotes a culture of excellence, creativity and an education that enables young people to succeed in their future.

A new eight-classroom Junior School building for Years 5 and 6 students will open in early 2027.

== Christian values ==
As a school operating under the auspices of Lutheran Education Queensland, Redeemer promotes the Lutheran denomination of the Christian faith. While staff are expected to uphold College ideals, students from any or no faith background are welcome.

In 2018, the College introduced and defined its new values, and then reinforced these in its 2021 strategic plan:

- Curious: A thirst to understand all that begs to be understood and to do so with a spirit of wonder.
- Courageous: Standing up for our convictions to do the right thing, even when it is hard or fearful.
- Christ-led: Seeing Christ in all people and serving Him in faith through caring for and serving others.

Service to others is a mainstay of College life, exemplified by students and staff volunteering on the Helping Hands van, which delivers food to homeless communities on Friday nights.

The College provides religious instruction through its Christian Studies curriculum, a compulsory twice-weekly in-class lesson for all students. There are also morning devotions, either through the weekly chapel gathering or in home rooms.

Pastoral care is strongly connected to Lutheran ideals and the College ethos. Home group teachers and Heads of House have primary responsibility for the daily pastoral care and wellbeing of students. The College also employs 2 professional counsellors.

The Our Saviour Lutheran Church congregation shares use of the Redeemer Chapel, and shares a chaplaincy resource with the College.

In 2023, the College introduced the role of Dean of Faith and Community Service, led by Christine Bianchi.

== Educational standards ==
Most senior school-leavers score strongly in the Australian Tertiary Admission Rank (ATAR), with roughly 20% of the graduating cohort achieving an ATAR of 90–99.

All Year 3, 5, 7 and 9 students participate in national NAPLAN testing, and the school consistently achieves Well Above and Above the national average across the domains of reading, writing, spelling, grammar and numeracy. In 2024, the College was the top-performing school in the Logan area, securing the highest NAPLAN results in all year levels.

In 2023, 69% of graduating students were studying at university.

In 2024, the median ATAR at Redeemer was 88.2%, well above the state average of approximately 74%.

== Co-curricular activities ==
Redeemer Lutheran College is well-known as a strong competitor in sport, music, co-curricular competitions like robotics, and academic competitions including debating.

The College, which runs more than 25 choral, band, string and jazz ensembles throughout the College every year, has won many music competitions, including MusicFest, Queensland Youth Music Awards, the Redlands Eisteddfod and the Gold Coast Eisteddfod.

In sport, Redeemer competes in the Greater Brisbane Conference competition in AFL, basketball, soccer (football), indoor cricket, netball, touch football, and volleyball. There are also GBC sports carnivals for swimming (Term 1), cross-country (Term 2) and athletics (Term 3).

In 2025, 271 Redeemer students from Years 7–12 participated in GBC Senior Sport, and 180 Junior school students from Years 3–6 participated in GBC Primary Sport.

Redeemer also has a strong reputation for its wide range of cultural and academic co-curricular opportunities, from debating and esports through to its co-curricular academic program, Elevate.

== History ==
The school was founded in 1980 by L. Robin Kleinschmidt, an Australian Lutheran educationalist. He served as headmaster of St Peters Lutheran College, Brisbane and was responsible in part for encouraging the theatrical talents of a young Sigrid Thornton.

Kleinschmidt served as headmaster of Redeemer College from foundation to 2001 and was responsible for the construction of most of the modern campus. His influence on the school can still be seen, particularly in the field of Debating, where the Inter-House Debating Trophy is known as the Robin Kleinschmidt Trophy. The school's music centre, which was erected in 1999, was renamed the Robin Kleinschmidt centre.

== Newsworthy events ==
In 2025, Redeemer Lutheran College was named by News Corp as the top co-ed private school in Queensland and number 64 in the top 100 schools in Australia. The honour was awarded to the College based on a broad range of data, including NAPLAN and ATAR academic results, subjects, facilities, sports and extracurricular activities.

In the same year, two Junior School students from Redeemer became finalists in the Prime Minister’s national spelling bee competition.

Art was also a winner in 2025, with two Senior School students winning highly commended places in the Year 7–8 category of the IEU Art Awards.

Sahil Kumar, one of Redeemer’s 2025 College Captains, was also featured in The Courier-Mail in August 2025 on his views of the responsibilities of school leadership.

In 2024, Kate Wilkinson, a long-time teacher at Redeemer Lutheran College and passionate advocate for entrepreneurship in schools, received an Excellence in Teaching Award in the 2024 Teach X awards. Teacher Steffany Mylonas was similarly honoured by Teach X in 2021 as an Education Rising Star of the Year.

College alumnus Helen Darville, author of the award-winning although controversial book, The Hand that Signed the Paper, claimed in interviews that she and a peer had experienced discrimination during her time at the school. It was later acknowledged she had created these events as “faction”, under the pseudonym Helen Demidenko. Then-headmaster, L. Robin Kleinschmidt, refuted her claims in his memoirs.

Warren Schneider, a teacher at Redeemer in the early 2000s, was jailed in 2007 for child sex offences related to students at both the College and a school at which he had previously taught.

== Notable alumni ==
- Zac Alexander – professional squash player and 2018 Commonwealth Games gold medallist
- Clay Cameron – former Australian Rules Footballer for the Gold Coast Football Club
- Helen Darville – Australian author and columnist
- Hon. Mick de Brenni – State Member for Springwood, Minister for Housing and Public Works
- David Giffin – former Wallabies vice-captain
- Lee Spurr – former Australian Rules footballer for the Fremantle Football Club

== See also ==
- List of schools in Queensland
