= HKSTV =

Satellite television network in Hong Kong

Hong Kong Satellite Television (HKSTV)
- Type: Broadcast television network
- Country: Hong Kong
- Availability: China, Taiwan
- Founded: 2010
- Owner: Hong Kong Satellite TV International Media Group (HKS)
- Official website: www.hkstv.tv

Hong Kong Satellite Television (HKSTV, traditional Chinese: 香港衛視, simplified Chinese: 香港卫视) is a non-domestic satellite television network consisting of two Mandarin-language channels, owned by Hong Kong Satellite TV International Media Group (HKS), based in Hong Kong. HKSTV was available in Hong Kong via Now TV and Cable TV Hong Kong between 2011 and 2014. It is now available over the internet in Taiwan via 5TV (China United) and also in mainland China via CNTV. The HKSTV signal can be picked up via satellite in over 140 countries world-wide. HKSTV distinguishes itself from other channels by using a mix of foreign and Chinese television hosts.

The company is registered in and named after Hong Kong, but most of its programmes are produced in mainland China.

== History ==
HKSTV was given licenses for six separate channels and one Internet-based television channel by the Hong Kong government in 2008. In 2010, HKSTV began broadcasting into Hong Kong. In 2011, HKSTV became the first Hong Kong television station to be broadcast into mainland China via CNTV. In 2013, HKSTV began broadcasting across Taiwan via 5TV, and can be reached in Taiwan.
