= List of Legend of the Seeker episodes =

Legend of the Seeker is an American television series produced by ABC Studios and distributed in domestic syndication by Disney-ABC Domestic Television. The show is based on the fantasy novel series The Sword of Truth written by Terry Goodkind and follows a woods guide who, after being thrust into a world of magic, is charged with the responsibility to protect the world from evil. The first season premiered with a double bill on November 1, 2008. The series was renewed for a second season in January 2009, which premiered on November 7, 2009. On April 26, 2010 Ausiello Files reported that the series has been cancelled and will not return for a third season. Fans of the series have responded by launching a renewal campaign titled "Save Our Seeker". Terry Goodkind has expressed his support for the campaign.

A total of 44 episodes aired throughout the series.

== Series overview ==
Season	Episodes	Originally released	
Season	Episodes	First released	Last released
1	22	November 1, 2008	May 23, 2009
2	22	November 7, 2009	May 22, 2010

== Episodes ==
=== Season 1 (2008–09) ===
When Richard Cypher (Craig Horner), a young woodsman, discovers that he is the one true Seeker and is prophecised to kill the evil tyrant Darken Rahl (Craig Parker). Along with the beautiful and mysterious Kahlan Amnell (Bridget Regan), a Confessor with the power to enslave people with a single touch, and a wise old wizard named Zeddicus Zu'l "Zedd" Zorander (Bruce Spence), Richard embarks on quest to fulfill the prophecy.

No. overall	No. in season	Title	Directed by	Written by	Original release date	Prod. code	U.S. viewers (millions)
–	–	"The Making of a Legend"	–	–	October 18, 2008	–	–
A special episode, narrated by Lucy Lawless.
1	1	"Prophecy"	Mark Beesley	John Shiban, Ken Biller & Stephen Tolkin	November 1, 2008	101	5.88
Kahlan escapes from the Midlands into Westland, where Zedd brought Richard over twenty years ago in an attempt to protect him from Darken Rahl. Kahlan gives Richard the Book of Counted Shadows and Zedd gives him the Sword of Truth, and together they name him Seeker.
2	2	"Destiny"	Mark Beesley	Ken Biller & Barry Schkolnick	November 1, 2008	102	5.0
Richard, Kahlan, Zedd and Dell' Chase Brandstone (Jay Laga'aia), Richard's best friend in Hartland, concoct a plan to find Ranssyn Fane (Andrew Robertt), a D'Haran working under Darken Rahl who almost murdered Kahlan, killed Richard's adopted father, and stole the Book of Counted Shadows. Meanwhile, Fane brings down the magical boundary which separates the Midlands from Westland and kidnaps Chase's daughter, Laura (Catherine Stephen).
3	3	"Bounty"	Jesse Warn	Chad Fiveash & James Stoteraux	November 8, 2008	104	4.31
When Darken Rahl begins offering a substantial reward for the Seeker's head all over the Midlands, Richard is attacked by all kinds of people. Several greedy bounty hunters begin to track Richard using magical maps.
4	4	"Brennidon"	Jonathan Brough	Erin Maher & Kay Reindl	November 15, 2008	105	4.21
Richard returns to his birth town, Brennidon, only to find it under siege by D'Haran soldiers. While trying to escape unnoticed, he comes upon a woman who claims to be his mother. Meanwhile, Kahlan helps Zedd find out if a lover's claims that he fathered her child are true.
5	5	"Listener"	Mark Beesley	Stephen Tolkin	November 22, 2008	106	4.24
Richard, Kahlan, and Zedd attempt to rescue a young Listener, a boy who has the power to read peoples' minds, from being captured by D'Harans.
6	6	"Elixir"	Charlie Haskell	Mike Sussman	November 29, 2008	103	3.0
Richard, Kahlan, and Zedd visit a town where peddlers have been selling bottled magic, a thoroughly imprudent practice with far-reaching, dangerous consequences. While Richard and Kahlan try to help the townspeople, Zedd faces off with the man behind the new trade: one of his old students.
7	7	"Identity"	Garth Maxwell	Chad Fiveash & James Stoteraux	December 6, 2008	107	3.55
In an attempt to avert a vision she has had of the Seeker's death, the witch woman Shota (Danielle Cormack) casts a spell on Richard that causes him to switch bodies with a merchant's son, Gryff (Jason Smith). Richard must now marry Bronwyn (Anna Hutchison), Gryff's fiancée, while Gryff accompanies Kahlan and Zedd on a plot to kill Demmin Nass (Renato Bartolomei), a D'Haran general on the verge of finding one of the Boxes of Orden.
8	8	"Denna"	Michael Hurst	Ken Biller & Mike Sussman	January 10, 2009	108	3.40
Kahlan leaves Richard's side after she realizes that their love and her power could potentially destroy him. But without her protection, Richard is captured by one of Rahl's Mord'Sith, Denna (Jessica Marais). Denna begins to torture and "break" him while Kahlan and Zedd try to find a way to save him.
9	9	"Puppeteer"	Mark Beesley	Nicki Paluga	January 17, 2009	109	3.21
Darken Rahl purchases the third and last Box of Orden from Queen Melena of Tamarang (Geraldine Brophy), and begins travelling towards her palace. In order to prevent him from obtaining the powerful artifact, Zedd sneaks into the palace as a puppeteer, and enlists the help of a servant girl, Rachel (Jordana Beatty).
10	10	"Sacrifice"	Michael Hurst	Chad Fiveash & James Stoteraux	January 24, 2009	111	2.83
Kahlan realises that her sister, Dennee Amnell (Tania Nolan), is still alive, but is being held captive in a nearby D'Haran prison. Kahlan disguises herself as a Mord'Sith and rescues her sister, discovering that Dennee is with child. When Dennee gives birth to her child, Richard and Kahlan are forced to fight the Mother Confessor herself in order to save the baby.
11	11	"Confession"	Garth Maxwell	Barry Schkolnick	January 31, 2009	110	2.55
Richard and Kahlan investigate the death of Conor Greenleaf (Phil Brooks), the leader of the Resistance movement against Darken Rahl, but become caught up in something much bigger than just one murder. Meanwhile, Zedd obtains the key to an ancient crypt from his younger brother, Thaddicus (Jon Brazier).
12	12	"Home"	Charlie Haskell	Stephen Tolkin	February 21, 2009	114	3.21
Darken Rahl has his wizard, Giller (Phil Peleton), cast a spell on Richard while he sleeps. The spell forces Richard to hallucinate that he is back in Hartland, that Kahlan, Zedd, and his entire adventure up until then does not exist and never happened. Rahl enters the hallucination as Richard's childhood friend, Anna Brighton (Jessica Chapnik Kahn), and tries to make him reveal the location of the third Box of Orden.
13	13	"Revenant"	Geoffrey Cawthorn	Erin Maher & Kay Reindl	February 28, 2009	112	3.40
Richard, Kahlan, and Zedd take the third Box of Orden to the Crypt of Kieran, where they plan to hide the magical item with the last Seeker's remains. Things take a drastic turn when the trio is trapped in the crypt with the spirits of Kieran (Matthew Walker), his Confessor Viviane (Mia Pistorius), and his wizard Amfortas (Michael Hurst), involving Richard, Kahlan, and Zedd in their long-forgotten struggles.
14	14	"Hartland"	Mark Beesley	Mike Sussman	March 7, 2009	113	3.25
While Zedd takes the third Box to an undisclosed location to hide it, Richard and Kahlan meet up with Chase, and learn that his entire family has been kidnapped. Richard, Kahlan, and Chase go back to Westland in order to discover what happened to Chase's family, only to discover that Hartland has been taken by D'Harans.
15	15	"Conversion"	Andrew Merrifield	Chad Fiveash & James Stoteraux	March 14, 2009	115	3.10
Wizard Giller has been studying the bodies of dead Confessors, in an attempt to find a way of bestowing the power of Confession on Darken Rahl. The test subjects for his grotesque experiments include the captured members of Chase's family, who Richard, Kahlan, and Chase go to great measures to rescue.
16	16	"Bloodline"	Garth Maxwell	Nicki Paluga	March 21, 2009	116	2.71
Richard, Kahlan, and Zedd save a young woman named Jennsen Rahl (Brooke Williams) from Denna, who has kidnapped the girl in order to obtain the third Box of Orden. Along the way, they discover that Jennsen is closer to Richard than they could ever have imagined, and that she herself is more powerful than she ever knew.
17	17	"Deception"	Chris Martin-Jones	Raf Green	March 28, 2009	117	2.70
Darken Rahl has begun using a new weapon against the Midlands' civilians, called Whisperers. While Zedd is taking Jennsen, Richard's sister, to safe location, Richard and Kahlan plan a spy mission to steal the D'Harans' supply of Whisperers. Complications arise when several members of the Resistance decide that they want to selfishly use the weapons for revenge.
18	18	"Mirror"	Jonathan Brough	Story by : Michael K. Sheeter; Teleplay by : Stephen Tolkin	April 25, 2009	118	2.58
Two common thieves obtain a magic that allows them to disguise themselves as the Seeker and Confessor, and use this elaborate ruse to cause havoc all over the Midlands. Unmasking the doubles becomes a matter of life and death for Richard, Kahlan, and Zedd.
19	19	"Cursed"	Mark Beesley	Chad Fiveash & James Stoteraux	May 2, 2009	119	2.37
Richard, Kahlan, and Zedd are summoned to help a kingdom rid its woods of the monstrous Calthrop. They soon discover that killing this beast will not be as easy as they had hoped. Along the way, Kahlan discovers a dangerous new power of her own.
20	20	"Sanctuary"	Garth Maxwell	Mike Sussman	May 9, 2009	120	2.10
Shota informs Zedd that there is another copy of the Book of Counted Shadows in the town of Breamont, and that the town's librarian, Livia, is the only one who can find it. Unfortunately, Rahl has also received the same information, so Richard, Kahlan, and Zedd must race to get the book before he does.
21	21	"Fever"	Jonathan Brough	Nicki Paluga	May 16, 2009	121	1.95
Darken Rahl discovers the town where Jennsen has been hiding with two of the Boxes of Orden. Jennsen manages to hide the Boxes before Rahl's men can capture her, but loses her memory when they try to beat the information out of her. Rahl uses this to his advantage, and tricks Jennsen into believing that Richard is the enemy.
22	22	"Reckoning"	Michael Hurst	Ken Biller & Stephen Tolkin	May 23, 2009	122	2.10
A magical cataclysm sends a Mord'Sith Cara Mason (Tabrett Bethell), Richard, and all three Boxes of Orden fifty-eight years into the future. While Richard roams this new world, back in the past Darken Rahl proclaims his victory, and forces Kahlan to become his wife, resulting in the rise of an even more powerful tyrant. To their collective distaste, Richard and the Mord'Sith Cara must work together in order to turn back the clock and defeat this new Rahl along with the old one.

=== Season 2 (2009–10) ===
The trio discovers that the defeat of Darken Rahl unknowingly caused a tear in the veil which separates the world of the living and the Underworld, and the only way to seal the tear is to seek out the legendary Stone of Tears. The team is also joined by the Mord'Sith Cara (Tabrett Bethell), who reluctantly teamed up with the Seeker and helped Richard kill Darken Rahl.

No. overall	No. in season	Title	Directed by	Written by	Original release date	Prod. code	U.S. viewers (millions)
23	1	"Marked"	Mark Beesley	Ken Biller & Stephen Tolkin	November 7, 2009	201	2.58
The defeat of Darken Rahl has caused a tear in the veil which separates the world of the living and the Underworld, allowing the Keeper of the Underworld to wage war on the living. Richard, Kahlan, and Zedd embark on a quest to find the Stone of Tears, the only thing that can seal the veil once more. They are joined by the Mord'Sith Cara Mason, an unlikely teammate who is stubbornly unhelpful at times, and is also the object of Kahlan's concern.
24	2	"Baneling"	Michael Hurst	Chad Fiveash & James Stoteraux	November 14, 2009	202	2.24
Richard, Kahlan, Cara, and Zedd discover a new creature called a baneling, dead souls who bargain with the Keeper for a second life in exchange for killing a person each day. In a D'Haran prison camp, they find a young man called Flynn (Michael Whalley) who possess a rune which opens the vault which they believe holds the Stone of Tears, or at least a clue as to its location.
25	3	"Broken"	Nicki Paluga	Chris Martin-Jones	November 21, 2009	203	2.50
When Cara reveals to the group that all the Confessors are dead, and that she personally killed Kahlan's sister Denee, Kahlan attempts to kill her. Under Richard's orders, Cara flees and returns to her hometown. She is held prisoner by the townspeople, and they try to get Kahlan to execute her, but she stops at the last minute.
26	4	"Touched"	Garth Maxwell	Arika Lisanne Mittman	November 28, 2009	204	2.41
When Kahlan finds out that there is still one more living Confessor in the world apart from her, the team sets off to find this last Confessor. But, when she refuses to listen to Kahlan, deadly consequences occur.
27	5	"Wizard"	Jonathan Brough	Stephen Tolkin	December 5, 2009	205	2.30
When Shota casts a spell on Zedd which makes him young and forget all his past, Zedd escapes her and becomes king of a town which is threatened to plunge into a rift to the underworld. Cara, Kahlan, and Richard try to find out where he went, and attempt to break the spell on him. The young Zedd is portrayed by Gabriel Mann.
28	6	"Fury"	Andrew Merrifield	Raf Green	December 12, 2009	206	2.67
Using the magical compass to guide their way to the stone of tears, Richard, Kahlan, Cara and Zedd come across a camp of Minders. There they come across an ancient magical spell that is connected to Richard and when the Sword of Truth's magic overcomes Richard, Zedd must teach him how to control his rage.
29	7	"Resurrection"	Jesse Warn	Mike Sussman	January 9, 2010	207	2.27
Richard is brought into conflict with a D'Haran general while searching for Whisperers and unwittingly becoming a pawn in Mord'Sith Denna's plan to gain control of D'Hara.
30	8	"Light"	Jonathan Brough	Chad Fiveash & James Stoteraux	January 16, 2010	208	2.34
Kahlan and Cara must find a captured Zedd, while the mysterious Sisters of the Light take Richard to the Old World to be trained to use his newly discovered powers.
31	9	"Dark"	Garth Maxwell	Nicki Paluga	January 23, 2010	209	2.45
Richard arrives at the Palace of the Prophets to begin his wizard training. He meets the beautiful and mysterious Nicci (Jolene Blalock) who tells him that the other sisters are lying to him. Not knowing whom to trust, Richard is forced into a dark alliance with Nicci while Kahlan, Zedd and Cara find and name a new Seeker in Richard's absence.
32	10	"Perdition"	Mark Beesley	Charley Dane	January 30, 2010	210	2.58
Richard is trapped in the Valley of Perdition and is experiencing his worst fears and whatever happens in his mind happens to his body. The team must save him in time with the Sisters of the Dark on their trail.
33	11	"Torn"	Chris Martin-Jones	Story by : Kristine Huntley; Teleplay by : Arika Lisanne Mittman	February 13, 2010	211	2.62
When Zedd and Kahlan use a magical amulet to travel to Aydindril, Kahlan seems a little strange afterwards.
34	12	"Hunger"	Michael Hurst	Raf Green & Ken Biller	February 20, 2010	212	2.11
During a fight, Cara is killed and then becomes a baneling in order to protect Richard. The team also learns that Sebastian (Ted Raimi) the map maker is back in town, and he is selling a cure for banelings alongside Zedd's younger brother, Thaddicus. During their travels, Cara's condition quickly escalates when she can find no one to kill for the Keeper.
35	13	"Princess"	Garth Maxwell	Stephen Tolkin	February 27, 2010	213	2.23
When Kahlan is kidnapped by the Margrave of Rothenburgh to be used as payment for eternal life, Richard, Zedd, and Cara pose as a royal party in order to find a way to free Kahlan from the dungeons, before she is handed over to the Sisters of the Dark. Starring Parker Stevenson as The Margrave.
36	14	"Bound"	Chris Martin-Jones	Arika Lisanne Mittman & Nicki Paluga	March 20, 2010	214	2.27
When Sister Nicci casts a spell on Kahlan, which magically links them to one another, Richard is forced to protect her from the Sisters of the Dark and lead her to the Stone of Tears. Meanwhile, Zedd, Kahlan, and Cara venture out to find Kahlan's father, in hopes that he has the key to breaking Sister Nicci's spell.
37	15	"Creator"	Mike Smith	Mike Sussman & Ken Biller	March 27, 2010	215	2.44
When a powerful woman claiming to be the Creator comes to execute Richard, proving her wrong and unraveling her identity becomes a matter of life and death.
38	16	"Desecrated"	Garth Maxwell	Chad Fiveash & James Stoteraux	April 10, 2010	216	2.02
The Seeker's birthday party takes a horrifying turn when a magician bent on revenge sends Kahlan and Cara into a tomb, where their air is dwindling and the time they have left is marked by an hourglass. In their search for their friends, Richard and Zedd must control the angry townspeople and find the insane magician before Kahlan and Cara's time runs out.
39	17	"Vengeance"	Michael Hurst	Charley Dane	April 17, 2010	217	2.34
Zedd and Thaddicus (Jon Braizer) go to look for Panis Rahl (Paul Barrett), Darken Rahl's father and the man who murdered their father. While following the compass without Zedd, a kindly old scholar offers to help Richard and the gang find an ancient scroll, which contains vital instructions for the owner of the Stone of Tears.
40	18	"Walter"	Andrew Merrifield	Stephen Tolkin & Ken Biller	April 24, 2010	218	2.41
A D'Haran captain tells a stranger at a tavern the story of a man who worked to protect Darken Rahl. Meanwhile, the gang is on Sister Marianna's trail, and Darken Rahl plots to exit the underworld in a curious manner.
41	19	"Extinction"	Jesse Warn	Story by : Nicki Paluga; Teleplay by : Chad Fiveash & James Stoteraux	May 1, 2010	219	1.96
While traveling to the forest of the Nightwisps, Kahlan is distraught to discover that Darken Rahl has burned the forest to ground, leaving one last Nightwisp in his possession, who he claims is with young. To acquire the Nightwisp and the secret of the scroll, Richard has to team up with Darken Rahl in order to save the world while the Keeper tries to send the Sisters of the Dark to bring Rahl back into the Underworld.
42	20	"Eternity"	Garth Maxwell	Raf Green & Arika Lisanne Mittman	May 8, 2010	220	2.21
Richard and Kahlan are trapped in a Magical Valley which contains the Stone of Tears. Meanwhile, Cara learns that trusting old friends is a risky business.
43	21	"Unbroken"	Michael Hurst	Mike Sussman	May 15, 2010	221	2.23
When Zedd casts the Spell of Undoing on Cara, the whole world changes and Zedd is transported to a parallel universe in which the Boxes of Orden were put together, and Cara was never a Mord'Sith, and therefore was never there to betray her sisters and kill Darken Rahl. When things take a dark turn, Zedd and Kahlan must find Cara and restore the world back to the way it was before it is too late.
44	22	"Tears"	Mark Beesley	Ken Biller & Stephen Tolkin	May 22, 2010	222	2.27
When the Keeper opens a wide rift that separates Richard from his companions, Richard has to continue on toward the Pillars Of Creation while Zedd and Cara have to save Kahlan from the clutches of Nicci's insidious magic.
