= A Perfect Pairing =

2022 American romantic comedy film

- Official release poster
- Directed by: Stuart McDonald
- Written by: Elizabeth Hackett; Hilary Galanoy
- Produced by: Deborah Evans; Hilary Galanoy; Deborah Glover; Elizabeth Hackett; Nathan Mayfield; Tracey Robertson; Robyn Snyder; Fernando Szew; Tracey Vieira
- Starring: Victoria Justice; Adam Demos; Luca Asta Sardelis; Samantha Tolj; Craig Horner; Antonio Alvarez
- Cinematography: Ben Nott
- Music by: Nerida Tyson-Chew
- Production companies: DAE Light Media; Front Row Films; Hoodlum Entertainment
- Distributed by: Netflix
- Release date: May 19, 2022
- Running time: 101 minutes
- Country: United States
- Language: English

A Perfect Pairing is a 2022 American romantic comedy film. Stuart McDonald directs the film and Victoria Justice stars as Lola while Adam Demos appears as Max.

Lola is a hard-driving LA wine-company executive who travels to an Australian sheep station and vineyard to land a major client, after quitting her job with a distributor to found her own company. She works as a ranch hand to prove her strong work ethic, sparking with a rugged local.

The film was released on May 19, 2022, on Netflix.

== Plot ==
LA-based wine executive Lola feels underappreciated by her boss Calder at Mythos, as he disregards her ideas. Knowing of her frustration, a chef introduces her to a little-known wine of an Australian company which has yet to go international. Lola secretly tells her workmate Audra about the Vaughn winery, who then pitches them to their boss behind Lola's back.

So, Lola starts up her own company and flies to Australia to secure the potential client before Mythos can. Initially signing up for their AirBNB accommodation, she immediately tries to pitch Hazel, who quickly turns her down. Discovering they are short a hired hand, Lola volunteers to work on the client's sheep farm under station boss Max to prove her moxie.

Thrown into the manual labor, Lola's workmates haze her, and she oversteps with excessively long showers and blowing the circuit breaker on the first day. Lola learns to mend fences, to not mix differently tagged sheep, to load a manure spreader... but after five days she has given up. Max's truck breaks down while taking her into town to catch a flight home.

So, on returning to the farm, Max tells Lola she should not give up. As she has the night to mull it over, she is inspired by a book about the farm's matriarch. Lola fixes the hot water heater, and gradually earns the trust of her fellow hired hands. She finally participates in the 'hands' evening gathering, showing she has a good singing voice.

After a day, Lola finally helps with shearing, at night she is invited into the family's pool by Max. Later, over a game of pool, he and Hazel discuss Lola's proposal to export with her company, revealing that Max is Hazel's brother. After Lola and Max tour the Vaughn vineyard and fence-mending, as they camp overnight, they finally show their feelings and give in to one another.

The next morning, Max reveals the secret that he is a Vaughn, his sister's silent partner, upsetting Lola. Feeling betrayed, she returns to the sheep farm, discovers Calder and Audra negotiating with Hazel to sign a contract to import Vaughn wines to the US. Calder tries to lure her back to Mythos, but she is unwavering.

Months later, Lola is back in California, working with Audra again with her tiny wine distribution company. Max appears at Lola's wine expo stand, declaring his feelings. His winery has dropped Calder's company for hers and he wants to be with her. They reconcile and return to Australia to celebrate Station Hand Sam's wedding.

== Cast ==
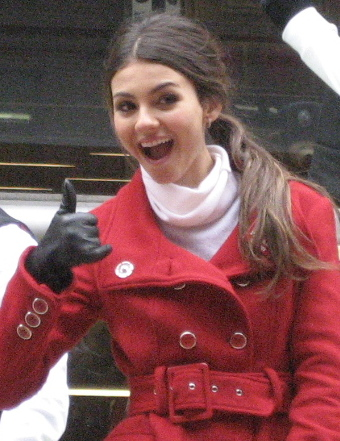
A Perfect Pairing follows the story of Lola, a wine executive, portrayed by Victoria Justice.

- Victoria Justice as Lola Alvarez, an LA-based wine executive
- Adam Demos as Max Vaughn, the cocky boss of the station who hides his identity
- Luca Asta Sardelis as Breeze
- Craig Horner as Calder, Lola's boss
- Antonio Alvarez as Carlos Alvarez, Lola's father
- Lucy Durack as Audra, Lola's coworker
- Emily Havea as Sam
- Natalie Abbott as Kylie
- Jayden Popik as Henry
- Samantha Tolj as Hazel Vaughn (credited as Samantha Cain)

== Production ==
The film was shot in Queensland, Australia and was produced by Hoodlum Entertainment in collaboration with Screen Australia. The film was supported by the City of Gold Coast and the filmmakers worked closely with the Animal Protection Agency to safeguard the animals featured in the film. In credits, the producers acknowledge the Kombumerri people of the Yugambeh language region, in which the film was shot. The screenwriters, Hilary Galanoy and Elizabeth Hackett have teamed up before in Falling Inn Love and Love, Guaranteed.

== Reception ==
On the review aggregator website Rotten Tomatoes, 50% of 14 critics' reviews are positive, with an average rating of 5/10. Film critic Aurora Amidon wrote that the film contains the hallmarks of a successful Hallmark film. She described Lola as a "refreshingly inspirational female character". The film shares its title with a Hallmark film, ("The Perfect Pairing") that was released earlier the same year. The scene of singalong to "Are You Gonna Be My Girl" by Jet is characterized as visual panache. Screen Rant reviewed the film as it may not "stand out to most but its aura is enough to warrant a watch." The film received some criticism as well. Natasha Alvar wrote the conversations are a "snooze fest" and minor characters are not very interesting.
