= Seear =

Seear is a surname. Notable people with the surname include:

- Gary Seear (1952–2018), New Zealand rugby player
- Maxine Seear (born 1984), Australian triathlete
- Nancy Seear, Baroness Seear (1913–1997), British social scientist and politician
- Noot Seear (born 1983), Canadian model and actress
