= Craig Horner =

Australian actor and musician

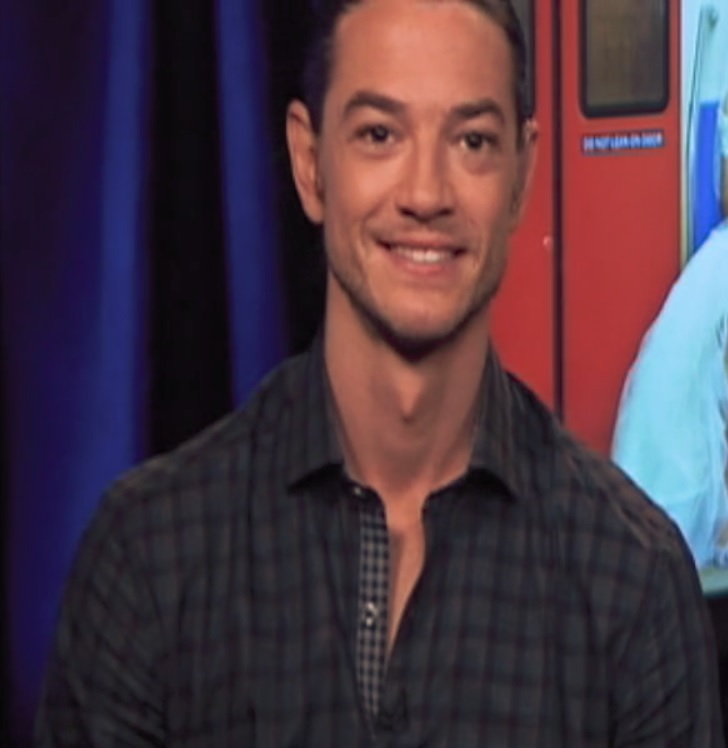
- Craig Horner discusses Hindsight in 2015
- Born: 24 January 1983 (age 43); Brisbane, Queensland, Australia
- Education: St Peters Lutheran College
- Occupations: Actor, musician
- Years active: 1998–present

Craig Horner (born 24 January 1983) is an Australian actor and musician who first appeared in the Australian television program Cybergirl. He is best known for his role as Richard Cypher in the television series Legend of the Seeker.

== Early life ==
From Brisbane, Queensland, Horner attended St Peters Lutheran College in the suburb of Indooroopilly. He discovered a love for acting after participating in school productions of 1945 – The Musical, A Midsummer Night's Dream and The Maids.

== Career ==
=== Acting ===
In 1998, Horner took on presenting duties in his role as a reporter on children's news series Totally Wild. Then in 2001, after graduating from high school, he made his television acting debut as 14-year old Jackson in children's science-fiction fantasy series Cybergirl. He appeared in all 26 episodes, through to 2002.

Horner was next seen in 2002 teen comedy drama film Blurred, before playing opposite Geoffrey Rush, Judy Davis and Jesse Spencer as Ronald Fingleton in 2003 Australian biographical drama film Swimming Upstream.

Horner starred opposite Rachael Taylor, as Richie in Gregory Dark's 2006 horror film, See No Evil. That same year, he played the regular role of Caleb in U.S. Lifetime series Monarch Cove. From 2007, he began playing the ongoing role of Ash Dove in children's fantasy series H2O: Just Add Water, featuring alongside Phoebe Tonkin and Claire Holt.

Horner joined the cast of the Australian teen drama series Blue Water High in its 2008 third season, portraying surfer Garry Miller. From 2008, he also starred as woodsman turned sword-fighting hero Richard Cypher in Sam Raimi-produced American fantasy series Legend of the Seeker, the syndicated television adaptation of Terry Goodkind's Sword of Truth book series.

In 2012, Horner played the title role in The CW time travel mystery television pilot Joey Dakota. He went on to appear in American comedy drama series Hindsight in 2015, portraying Sean, main character Becca's first husband. The following year, he landed a guest-starring role as the Count of Monte Cristo in an episode of Once Upon a Time.

In 2021, Horner played the role of Owen in the film This Little Love of Mine. The following year, he appeared alongside Victoria Justice and Adam Demos in American romantic comedy drama film A Perfect Pairing, playing the role of Calder. In 2022, Horner also began playing the regular role of Sunny Gray in children's series Rock Island Mysteries.

=== Music ===
In addition to acting, Horner has been active as a musician, playing the guitar and writing music. He was a member of the band 'Earth For Now' (known as 'Unstable Conditions' in 2011) who played their first show in Hollywood, California, starting the set with "Howl at the Moon". Horner and bandmate Steve Matsumura announced their departure from the band on 2 February 2012. He published two songs on iTunes – "Avoid" and "Say What You Mean", under the name 'Ithaca'.

== Filmography ==
=== Film ===
Year	Title	Role	Type	Ref
2002	Blurred	Pete the Bus Nerd	Feature film	
2003	Swimming Upstream	Ronald Fingleton	Feature film	
2003	The Moment After		Short film	
2006	See No Evil	Richie Bernson	Feature film	
2014	See No Evil 2	Richie Bernson (uncredited)	Feature film	
2019	The Dying Kind		Short film	
2021	This Little Love of Mine	Owen	Feature film	
2022	A Perfect Pairing	Calder	Feature film	

=== Television ===
Year	Title	Role	Type	Ref
1998	Totally Wild	Presenter		
2001–2002	Cybergirl	Jackson Campbell	26 episodes	
2005	headLand	Neil Slattery	Season 1, episodes 11-12	
2006	Two Twisted	Mason	Miniseries, season 1, episode 14	
2006	Monarch Cove	Caleb Demanser	8 episodes	
2007–2008	H2O: Just Add Water	Ash Dove	11 episodes	
2008	Blue Water High	Garry Miller	Season 3, 25 episodes	
2008–2010	Legend of the Seeker	Richard Cypher	44 episodes	
2012	Joey Dakota	Joey Dakota	TV pilot	
2015	Hindsight	Sean Reeves	10 episodes	
2016	Once Upon a Time	Edmond Dantès / Count of Monte Cristo	Season 6, 1 episode	
2016	The Deleted	Conner	1 episode	
2018	Cuddle Buddies	Zack		
2022–2024	Rock Island Mysteries	Sunny Gray	Seasons 1–3, 24 episodes	

== Theatre ==
Year	Title	Role	Type	Ref
1998	Theatre Sports			
1999	1945 – The Musical	Chuck	St Peter's Lutheran College, Brisbane	
2000	A Midsummer Night's Dream	Oberon	St Peter's Lutheran College, Brisbane	
2000	The Zoo Story	Peter	St Peter's Lutheran College, Brisbane	
2000	The Maids	Solange	St Peter's Lutheran College, Brisbane	
