= Cybergirl =

Australian-French children's television series

- DVD cover
- Genre: Action-adventure; Science fiction; Cyberpunk; Superhero fiction
- Created by: Jonathan M. Shiff
- Directed by: Mark Defriest; Michael Carson
- Starring: Ania Stepien; Craig Horner; Mark Owen-Taylor; Jennifer Congram; Ric Anderson; Septimus Caton; Winston Cooper; Peter Mochrie; Jovita Shaw
- Composers: Garry McDonald; Lawrence Stone
- Countries of origin: Australia; France
- Original language: English
- No. of series: 1
- No. of episodes: 26

Production
- Executive producers: Jonathan M. Shiff; Kay Ben M'Rad
- Producers: Daniel Scharf; Jonathan M. Shiff
- Production location: Brisbane, Australia
- Cinematography: Ian 'Thistle' Thorburn
- Editors: Angie Higgins; Andrew Macneil
- Running time: 25 minutes
- Production companies: Pacific Film and Television Commission; Melbourne Film Office; Network Ten; France Animation; Australian Film Finance Corporation; New South Wales Film and Television Office (uncredited); Australian Children's Television Foundation (uncredited); Jonathan M. Shiff Productions

Original release
- Network: Network Ten
- Release: 21 July 2001 – 11 January 2002

Cybergirl is an Australian-French children's television series that was first broadcast on Network Ten in Australia. The 26-episode series, debuting in 2001, was created by Jonathan M. Shiff, whose previous series include Ocean Girl. It stars Ania Stepien in the title role.

== Plot ==
Cybergirl is a Blue superheroine Human Prototype 6000 living under the secret identity of ordinary teenage girl Ashley Campbell. In reality, she is a "Human Prototype 6000" from a distant planet.

Her powers include super-human strength, super-human speed, and the ability to interface directly with electronic devices and computers; she is also able to physically change her appearance between that of the blue-haired, ethereal-looking Cybergirl and the less conspicuous, mousy-haired Ashley, and can alter her clothing at will.

She was originally known as the Cyber Replicant Human Prototype 6000, the only one of her model to be built. Not only are her powers far and above that of earlier models, she has a much wider emotional scope than her predecessors. She ran away from her planet of origin in order to explore the beings she was modeled after, namely humans.

Two other Evil Red Replicants called Isaac and Xanda are sent after her and their sole mission is to destroy her. She lands on Earth in the fictional city of River City, Australia which is modeled on and filmed in Brisbane; nevertheless, "River City" is another popular nickname for Brisbane. She meets Jackson and Hugh Campbell, who take her in, and she adopts the name Cybergirl as her superheroine identity. Jackson calls her "Cy" and she later uses her powers to make herself look more human; this identity is called Ashley, in which she poses as Jackson's cousin and Hugh's niece. The only other person besides Hugh and Jackson to know her identity is Kat, her friend and neighbour.

She is pursued not only by Xanda and Isaac, but also by a powerful software mogul named Rhyss. She is well loved by the populace of River City, however, and she enjoys the approval of Mayor Buxton, whose twin daughters Emerald and Sapphire are big fans of the superheroine. Ironically they snub her, as Ashley, at school.

== Cast ==
=== Main ===
- Ania Stepien as Ashley Campbell / Cybergirl
- Craig Horner as Jackson Campbell
- Mark Owen-Taylor as Hugh Campbell
- Jennifer Congram as Xanda
- Ric Anderson as Isaac
- Septimus Caton as Rhyss
- Winston Cooper as Giorgio
- Peter Mochrie as Rick Fontaine
- Jovita Shaw as Kat Fontaine

=== Recurring ===
- Christine Amor as Mayor Burdette Buxton
- David Vallon as Romirez
- Michelle Atkinson as Anthea
- Jessica Origliasso as Emerald Buxton
- Lisa Origliasso as Sapphire Buxton
- Tony Hawkins as McMurtrie

=== Guest ===
- John Dommett as Mr. Southerly
- Jason Klarwein as Sales Assistant
- Daniel Amalm as Marco
- Julie Eckersley as Julia
- Damien Garvey as Paramedic
- Remi Broadway as Zak Furnace

== Episodes ==
| No. | Title | Directed by | Written by | Original release date |
|---|---|---|---|---|
| 1 | "Episode 1" | Mark Defriest | David Phillips | 31 July 2001 |
| 2 | "Episode 2" | Mark Defriest | David Phillips | 7 August 2001 |
| 3 | "Episode 3" | Mark Defriest | Barbara Bishop | 14 August 2001 |
| 4 | "Episode 4" | Mark Defriest | Barbara Bishop | 21 August 2001 |
| 5 | "Episode 5" | Mark Defriest | Helen MacWhirter | 28 August 2001 |
| 6 | "Episode 6" | Mark Defriest | Helen MacWhirter | 4 September 2001 |
| 7 | "Episode 7" | Mark Defriest | Everett Deroche | 11 September 2001 |
| 8 | "Episode 8" | Mark Defriest | Everett Deroche | 18 September 2001 |
| 9 | "Episode 9" | Michael Carson | Annie Fox | 25 September 2001 |
| 10 | "Episode 10" | Michael Carson | Annie Fox | 2 October 2001 |
| 11 | "Episode 11" | Michael Carson | Peter Kinloch | 9 October 2001 |
| 12 | "Episode 12" | Michael Carson | Peter Kinloch | 16 October 2001 |
| 13 | "Episode 13" | Michael Carson | Barbara Bishop | 23 October 2001 |
| 14 | "Episode 14" | Michael Carson | Barbara Bishop | 30 October 2001 |
| 15 | "Episode 15" | Michael Carson | Annie Fox | 6 November 2001 |
| 16 | "Episode 16" | Michael Carson | Helen MacWhirter | 13 November 2001 |
| 17 | "Episode 17" | Michael Carson | Charlie Strachan | 20 November 2001 |
| 18 | "Episode 18" | Michael Carson | Everett Deroche | 27 November 2001 |
| 19 | "Episode 19" | Mark Defriest | Everett Deroche | 4 December 2001 |
| 20 | "Episode 20" | Mark Defriest | Annie Fox | 11 December 2001 |
| 21 | "Episode 21" | Mark Defriest | Peter Kinloch | 18 December 2001 |
| 22 | "Episode 22" | Mark Defriest | Peter Kinloch | 25 December 2001 |
| 23 | "Episode 23" | Mark Defriest | Barbara Bishop | 1 January 2002 |
| 24 | "Episode 24" | Mark Defriest | Barbara Bishop | 8 January 2002 |
| 25 | "Episode 25" | Mark Defriest | David Phillips | 11 January 2002 |
| 26 | "Episode 26" | Mark Defriest | David Phillips | 11 January 2002 |

== Home media ==
Cybergirl was released on DVD on 4 December 2006 as CyberGirl: The Superhero for a New Generation – The Complete Series. The set includes all 26 episodes on 4 DVDs and is Region 0. The release includes making of/behind-the-scenes featurettes created from a period Electronic Press Kit and the packaging makes frequent references to the fact that the series features "before they were famous" appearances by The Veronicas.

== Reception ==
The first episode won the 2001 AFI Award for Best Children's Television Series and was nominated for the 2002 Logie Award for Most Outstanding Children's Program.

In a negative review, Vicki Englund of The Courier-Mail wrote, "After a disappointingly slow debut episode, this Brisbane-based children's series seems to be gathering momentum, although some quickening of the pace would still be advisable to keep the young'uns from channel-surfing." The Courier-Mail's Amelia Oberhardt praised the show, stating, "Cybergirl is, surprisingly, an entertaining way to spend 30 minutes. ... We can only assume Cybergirl is a spoof and is therefore more than a bit of fun. Ania Stephen, who plays Cybergirl, is either one of the most wooden actors of all time or a genius at playing spoofs." Leanne Younes of the Canberra Times gave it a rating of "Fast action, great make-up and cool music."
