= Spa Weekend =

2026 American comedy film

- Theatrical release poster
- Directed by: Jon Lucas; Scott Moore
- Written by: Jon Lucas; Scott Moore
- Produced by: Suzanne Todd; John Friedberg
- Starring: Leslie Mann; Isla Fisher; Michelle Buteau; Anna Faris; Adam Demos
- Cinematography: Danny Ruhlmann
- Edited by: James Thomas; Delaney Del Vecchio
- Music by: Philip White
- Production companies: Black Bear Pictures; Team Todd
- Distributed by: Black Bear Pictures
- Release date: August 21, 2026
- Running time: 97 minutes
- Country: United States
- Language: English
- Budget: $20 million
- Box office: $13.8 million

Spa Weekend is a 2026 American comedy film written and directed by Jon Lucas and Scott Moore. It stars Leslie Mann, Isla Fisher, Michelle Buteau, Anna Faris, and Adam Demos telling the story of four friends who reconnect with one another for a spa weekend.

The film was released on August 21, 2026, and received negative reviews from critics, grossing $13.8 million against a $20 million budget.

== Plot ==
Four childhood best friends – Jane, Sophie, Coco, and Mel – have grown apart as adults due to their busy lives. Coco books a spa weekend at the Solaris Resort for her, Jane, and Sophie for Jane's birthday weekend, but they decide not to invite Mel because she is reckless and gets them into trouble. However, a guilty Sophie invites Mel at the last minute.

Mel causes a few disruptions during the weekend, like getting Sophie fired from her job after yelling at her boss, and also getting Coco's ex-husband Roger to show up at the resort. Jane ends up hooking up with a yoga instructor named Kai, while Sophie submits her resume to the hotel since she managed to fix a computer issue quickly. Coco also ends up reconnecting with Roger, though he has no intentions of getting back together even though they sleep together.

Mel nearly gets the group kicked out after stealing and crashing a golf cart, but Jane convinces resort manager Shanti to let them stay after a warning. Mel throws a party for Jane with strippers and other hotel guests, which causes some more damage to the hotel. The ladies are arrested and Coco tells Mel how the group really feels about her since she is such a disaster. Shanti tries to press charges against the ladies, but Mel takes full responsibility so they can go, banning all of them from returning to the resort. After learning from Roger that Mel is broke and lonely, the ladies return to the resort to convince Shanti to drop the charges against Mel after defending her. Shanti begrudgingly agrees just so they shut up.

Jane gets with Kai, and Sophie is hired by Solaris to check out all of their hotels and resorts. The ladies go on their next trip to Monte Carlo.

== Cast ==
- Isla Fisher as Mel
  - Quinn Aune as young Mel
- Leslie Mann as Jane
  - Everly Graves as young Jane
- Anna Faris as Sophie
  - Juliet Sargent as young Sophie
- Michelle Buteau as Coco
  - Sierra Peters as young Coco
- Adam Demos as Kai
- Erika Heynatz as Shanti
- Donné Ngabo (Credited: Dieudonne Ngabo) as Solaris Valet
- Dominic Ona-Ariki as Roger
- Peter Thurnwald as Dylan
- Tim Ross as Derek
- Robert Coleby as Mike Tomaszewski
- Felix Williamson as Toby
- Diana Glenn as Margaret
- Damian Walshe-Howling as Max
- Erika Heynatz as Shanti
- Kate Lister as Clare
- Chum Ehelepola as Kent
- Genevieve Hegney as Carol
- Rachael Carpani as Isla

== Production ==
In August 2024, it was announced that a comedy titled Spa Weekend was in development, with Jon Lucas and Scott Moore writing and directing, and with Isla Fisher, Leslie Mann, Anna Faris, and Michelle Buteau joining the cast. Principal photography began on February 14, 2025, in Queensland, Australia.

Philip White was hired to compose the score for the film. White previously collaborated with Lucas and Moore on Jexi.

== Release ==
Spa Weekend was released on August 21, 2026 by Black Bear Pictures in 2,009 theaters. It was previously scheduled to be released on September 4, 2026.

== Reception ==
On the review aggregator website Rotten Tomatoes, 29% of 45 critics' reviews are positive, with an average rating of 4.3/10. The website's consensus reads: "Saddling a terrific cast with meager material, Spa Weekend never relaxes as it stacks hijinks upon hijinks without unlocking how to make all the antics particularly funny." Metacritic, which uses a weighted average, assigned the film a score of 33 out of 100, based on 17 critics, indicating "generally unfavorable" reviews. Audiences polled by CinemaScore gave the film an average grade of "B+" on an A+ to F.
