= Ally Blake =

Australian writer of romance novels

Ally Blake is an Australian writer of romance novels.

== Biography ==
Ally Blake was born in the small town of Millmerran in Outback Queensland, Australia. She graduated from St Peters Lutheran College in Brisbane. She earned her bachelor's degree from the University of Queensland, with a double English major.

She was a cheerleader for both the Brisbane Broncos football team and the Gold Coast Rollers basketball teams. She was a contracted dancer on The Footy Show for Channel Nine in Brisbane. For two years, she was the secretary of the Queensland branch of the Australian Cinematographers Society.

Ally married in Las Vegas in 2000, and since then has lived in both Melbourne and Brisbane. She and her husband have three children.

== Career ==
In 2003, Ally's first romance novel, The Wedding Wish, was published by Harlequin Mills & Boon. This book was nominated by industry magazine Romantic Times as Best First Series Romance of 2004. Since that time she has sold 16 novels, both for the Harlequin Romance and Modern Heat imprints. In 2007 she was nominated for the reader judged HOLT (Honoring Outstanding Literary Talent) Medallion for Best Traditional Romance published in 2006.

Ally has now sold over four million books worldwide in over twenty-five countries. She has hosted courses at public libraries and romance writing conventions and has appeared in the print media and on A Current Affair. She also designs romance author websites including those for award winners Liz Fielding, Lucy Gordon and Trish Wylie as well as her own

== Bibliography ==
=== Harlequin Romances ===
- Hired: The Boss's Bride ~ October 2008
- Falling for the Rebel Heir ~ March 2008
- Millionaire to the Rescue ~ October 2007
- Billionaire on Her Doorstep ~ June 2007
- Meant-To-Be Mother ~ January 2007
- Wanted: Outback Wife (Miniseries: Brides of Bella Lucia) ~ October 2006
- A Father in the Making ~ April 2006
- The Shock Engagement (Miniseries: Office Gossip) ~ November 2005
- Marriage Make-Over ~ January 2005
- Marriage Material ~ June 2004
- The Wedding Wish ~ December 2003

=== Silhouette Romances ===
- A Mother For His Daughter ~ December 2006
- How To Marry A Billionaire ~ November 2006

=== Modern Heat (aka Modern Extra Sensual Romances) ===
- The Magnate's Indecent Proposal ~ May 2008
- Steamy Surrender ~ September 2007
- Getting Down To Business ~ April 2007

=== Other ===
- Sizzle, Seduce & Simmer ~ November 2007
- The Barrackers Are Shouting (by fans of the Collingwood Football Club)
