= St Peters Lutheran College =

Location
- Indooroopilly, Queensland, 4068; Australia; 27°30′18″S 152°59′4″E

Information
- School type: Private school
- Motto: Latin: Plus ultra (Further Beyond/Ever Higher)
- Religious affiliation: Lutheran
- Established: 1945
- Authority: Lutheran Church of Australia, Queensland Curriculum and Assessment Authority
- Head of College: Tim Kotzur
- Staff: 192 teaching, 312 non-teaching (in 2025)
- Grades: Prep–year 12
- Gender: Co-educational
- Enrolment: 2982 (in 2023)
- Campuses: Indooroopilly, Springfield, Crows Nest
- Houses: Gould; Mitchell; Leichhardt; Cawley; Bradman; Cunningham; Chisolm; Laver; Sutherland
- Colours: Maroon; Gold; White
- Slogan: Excellence in Christian co-education
- Affiliation: Associated Independent Colleges
- Website: stpeters.qld.edu.au

St Peters Lutheran College is the largest Lutheran, co-educational private school in Queensland, Australia, with teaching campuses in Indooroopilly and Springfield, and an outdoor education centre in Crows Nest. The college provides Prep to Year 12 education with domestic day schooling at Springfield, while at the larger Indooroopilly campus takes domestic and international day and boarding. In Year 9, students spend five weeks completing the Ironbark Outdoor Education Program at the outdoor education centre in Crows Nest.

The college was founded in 1945 with the initial purchase of Ross Roy House, later expanding through neighbouring properties and the opening of the Springfield campus in 2008. Both Ross Roy and the chapel have been listed in the Queensland Heritage Register since 2012.

In 2017, St Peters had an enrolment of 1986 students with a teaching staff of 183 teachers with 182 non-teaching staff. As of 2025, the school employs approximately 550 permanent employees (including teaching, groundskeeping and cafeteria staff) and additional employees in casual positions.

== History ==
St Peters Lutheran College was established at Indooroopilly by the Lutheran Church in 1945 with 56 boarding students. Ross Roy was the main building and focus for early college life with Luther House built by voluntary labour soon after the college's commencement. St Peters has had seven heads in its history and is the largest Lutheran school in Australia, today, with an enrolment maintained at approximately 2000 day and boarding students and 350 teaching and non-teaching staff. The boarding enrolments are maintained at 150 students. St Peters Lutheran College – Ironbark Outdoor Education Centre, via Crows Nest, was established in 1974 as a trial program and in 1976 as an ongoing outdoor education program. This life changing experience is a five-week program for Year 9 students and indicates St Peters positive and strong commitment to ‘growing’ our Junior High students in significant ways. The ‘Ironbark Experience’ is seen by staff, parents and students as a vital part of the St Peters journey, fostering independence, resilience, teamwork, problem solving, ethical decision making, sustainability and environmental awareness in our young people. Commencing in 2008, St Peters Lutheran College Springfield began as a Prep to Year 8 school. It now caters for Prep to Year 12 and provides the Springfield and adjacent communities with the many benefits of the St Peters journey. All St Peters schools operate under the control of the St Peters Lutheran College Council and Head of College, governed by the Lutheran Church of Australia Queensland District.

== Symbolism ==
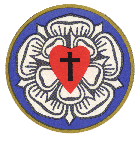
Luther's seal

There are certain symbolic icons present in the college emblem, including Martin Luther's iconic white rose from his seal, and an inverted cross for St Peter, leader of the Apostles in the early Christian Church, who was crucified upside-down.

The school's motto, Plus Ultra, which is Latin for "Ever Higher", is said to emphasise the college's desire for the students to reach their goals in their learning.

== Campus ==
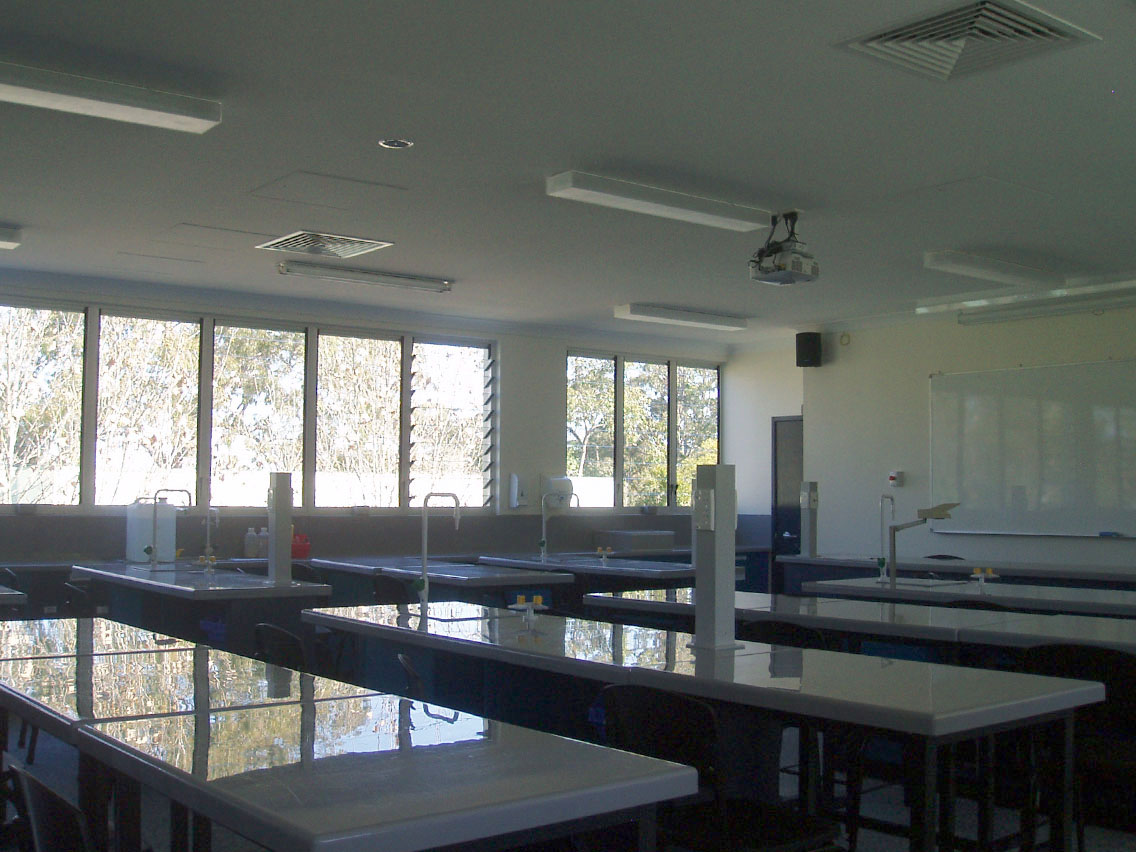
Science lab

Starting with the 1897 Villa "Ross Roy", bought and used as the first building of St Peters in 1945, the college campus has seen significant growth and change over the years.

Theile House, a four-storey building comprising computer labs, classrooms, Year 11/12 lockers, and the Theile study centre, was recently renovated and extended. The facilities in the new building include a study centre for students in Years 11 and 12, with three private study/meeting rooms and numerous computers and laptops available to students. The girls' boarding houses have also been renovated, now featuring air conditioning, and a multi-purpose court.

There are three libraries on campus. The Senior School library (also known as the Karl Langer Library after the architect who designed the Chapel) is a three-storey facility where students and staff can access a collection of fiction and non-fiction. There are approximately 80 computers and students have access to a number of databases to which the school subscribes.

In 2013, a Performing Arts Centre was also opened. This is a three-storey facility including an auditorium, theatrette, orchestra and band rooms, music and drama classrooms, and rooms for instrumental tuition and practice.

In 2024, the Centre of Learning and Innovation (CLI) finished construction. It was built on the site of the previous Luther House, which was demolished due to the building containing asbestos. The building consists of 4 recording studios, an amphitheatre, multiple breakout areas and classrooms over four stories. Many events such as robotics competitions have since been held at the venue, such as the FIRST Tech Challenge Qualifiers.

According to the St Peters Lutheran Masterplan booklet released in 2019/2020, proposed future projects include relocating Years 5/6 from the Upper Primary/Junior High area in the south to the Lower Primary area in the north, improved parking and drop off areas, new administrative buildings, another pool and sport hall, extension to 2 libraries and Mayer Oval, relocation of the boys and girls boarding houses and other smaller redevelopment projects. However, the COVID-19 pandemic that year caused severe delays in the construction of the Centre of Learning and Innovation and it is unsure whether a majority of these projects will be constructed before the proposed date of 2030.

=== Ironbark ===
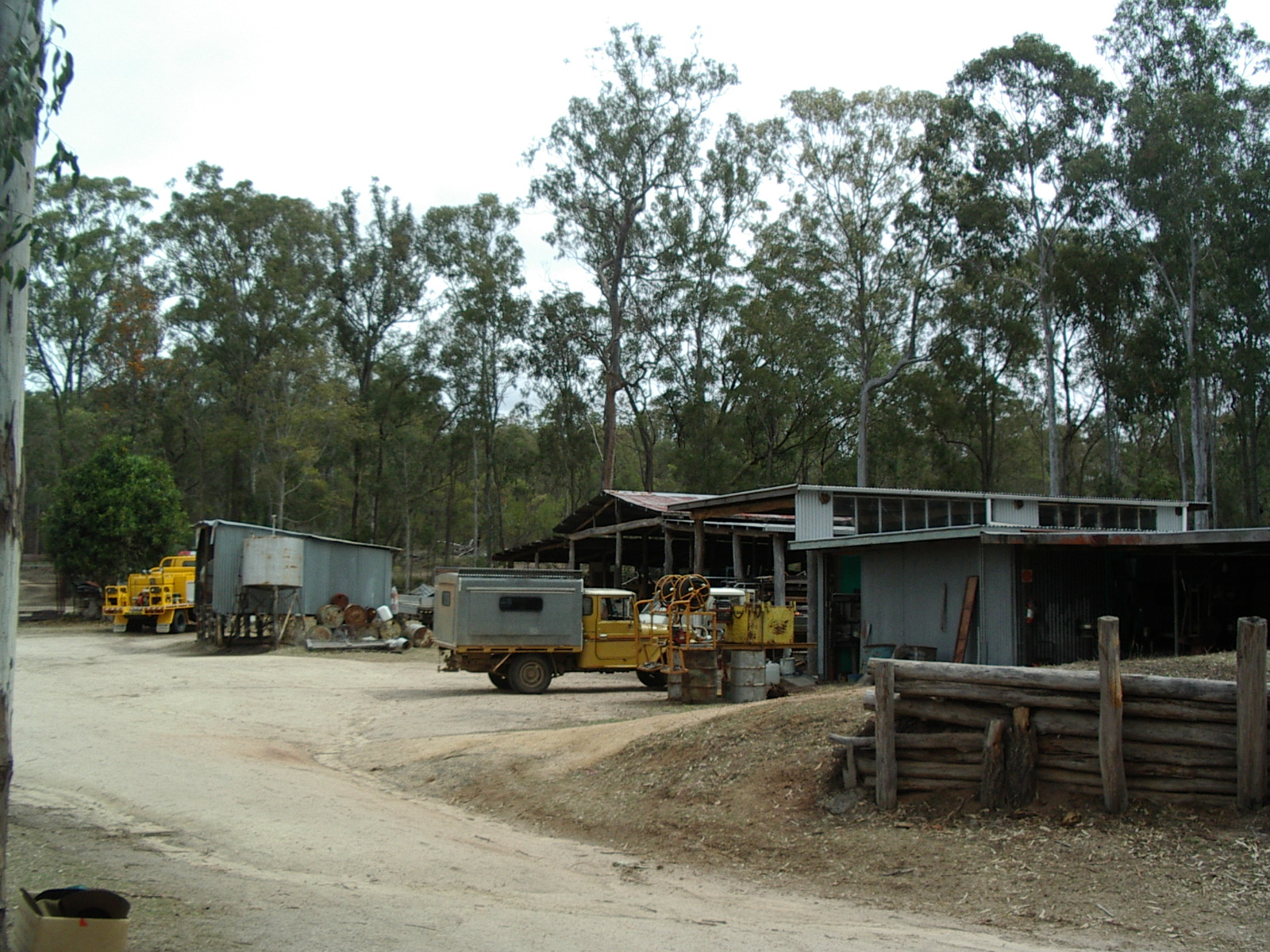
Workshop at Ironbark

Ironbark is the outdoor campus of St Peters Lutheran College. Located near the town of Crows Nest, some 50 kilometres (31 mi) north of Toowoomba and 150 kilometres (93 mi) north-west of Brisbane, the property consists of 600 hectares (1,483 acres) of heavily timbered, undulating granite country. The donation of land in 1971, provided the College with an opportunity to develop and implement an outdoor education program. After several years of discussion and planning, a pilot program was run in 1974. Following the success of the pilot program, Ironbark has been part of the College curriculum since 1976. Ironbark was named for the Eucalyptus Crebra, the narrow leaf Ironbark, which grows across the property.

== Heads of College ==
The Heads of College have been:

Period	Details
1945–1954	Wilfred Carl Schneider
1955–1970	Hermann Wilhelm Albrecht Lohe
1971–1994	Carson Dron
1995–2002, 2011	Sally Chandler
2003–2011	Stephen Rudolph
2012–2016	Adrian Wiles
2017–	Tim Kotzur

== Curriculum ==
The St Peters curriculum is designed to provide a continuum of experience and knowledge acquisition from Prep to Year 12. To this end, St Peters offers programs within four separate sub-schools: Lower Primary (P–4), Upper Primary (5–6), Junior High (7–9) and Senior School (10–12). Each sub-school operates semi-autonomously with its own Head of Sub-School and administration. The Senior School offers the International Baccalaureate Diploma Program in addition to the standard QCE program.

Since 2004, the school has run an exchange program in conjunction with sister school, Immanuel college, in Adelaide, South Australia. The focus of the exchange program, or "Mind Change" as it is known, is to allow gifted students from both schools a chance to meet students their age who they can relate their interests to.

== Music Program ==
St Peters Lutheran College offers private tuition in many instruments and offers a music scholarship to students. The music department is split into 3 sub-departments, the Strings, Choir and Band departments. The college also has various music ensembles, most of which rehearse in its Performing Arts Centre. Its most notable ensembles are listed as follows:

=== Bands ===
- Symphonic Winds*, an auditioned, award winning ensemble for advanced Junior High and Senior School students.
- Wind Ensemble**, an auditioned intermediate ensemble for students below Symphonic Winds.
- Senior Stage Band*, composed of advanced students invited from Symphonic Winds. This group tours in conjunction with the Symphonic Winds.
- Senior Percussion Ensemble, an extension ensemble for advanced percussionists.
- Drumline, an advanced percussion ensemble modeled on the American Drumline that joins with the Symphonic Winds to form the St Peters Marching Band at the annual Brisbane City ANZAC Day March.

=== Strings ===
- St Peters Soloists*, the flagship string ensemble that performs at formal functions and members are part of the Symphony Orchestra for the annual Performer of the Year - Concerto Competition.
- Chamber Soloists**, an ensemble of advanced students from the St Peters Soloists.
- Neon Pulse, selected string players from the St Peters Soloists that combine music and dance choreography to create a unique, electrified sound.

=== Choirs ===
- St Peters Chorale*, an auditioned, SATB choir for students in Years 9-12 with a national and international reputation for its performance of Australian repertoire.
- Chamber Chorale, a choir of members drawn from the St Peters Chorale.

* indicates the ensemble tours internationally and occasionally nationally, ** indicates the ensemble tours regionally or nationally only.

Touring is an essential part of St Peters ensembles. Currently, the senior ensembles (St Peters Symphonic Winds, St Peters Soloists and St Peters Chorale) participate in an international tour every 3 years (in alternating years). Recent tours include the 2023 Symphonic Winds to US/Canada and 2023 Soloists Tour to Japan, and the 2024 Chorale Tour to UK/Germany/Austria.

Aside from regular performances of these ensembles, since 2015 St Peters has hosted some of Australia's most talented musicians and ensembles including: Deep Blue Orchestra, Dragon, James Morrison, Katie Noonan, Leo Sayer, Grace Knight, Greta Bradman, Jane Rutter, Black Sorrows, Ian Moss, The Choir Boys, Idea of North, Nikki Parrott, Monica Trapaga and the Australian String Quartet.

Every year, music students can audition for one of the two categories, Recital and Concerto in the annual Performer of the Year Competition. Students are selected to be in the Finalists who compete in the final competitions. Concerto Finalists are accompanied by the St Peters Symphony Orchestra which only performs at this event.

== Sport ==
St Peters Lutheran College boys have competed in the Associated Independent Colleges (AIC) competition since 1999, when the college left The Associated Schools (TAS) following the formation of the AIC in 1998. The girls compete in the Queensland Girls' Secondary Schools Sports Association (QGSSSA) competitions

=== AIC premierships ===
St Peters Lutheran College has won the following AIC premierships.

- Basketball – 2007
- Rugby (2) – 2000, 2012
- Soccer (2) – 2014, 2020
- Swimming (13) – 1999, 2000, 2012, 2014, 2017, 2018, 2019, 2020, 2021, 2022, 2023, 2024, 2025,
- Tennis (12) – 1999, 2013, 2014, 2015, 2016, 2017, 2018, 2019, 2020, 2023, 2024, 2025
- Volleyball (4) – 2012, 2013, 2014, 2023

=== TAS Premierships ===
St Peters Lutheran College has won the following TAS premierships.

- Rugby (5) – 1966, 1968, 1983, 1986, 1996
- Basketball – 1983, 1987
- Australian Basketball Champions – 1986
- TAS Blue (1st division) and Red (2nd division) Swimming – 1997

=== QGSSSA premierships ===
St Peters Lutheran College has won the following QGSSA premierships (Please note this data has only been accounted for the past 10 or so years).

- Swimming (12) – 2014, 2015, 2016, 2017, 2018, 2019, 2020, 2021, 2022, 2023, 2024, 2025, 2026
- Volleyball – 2025, 2024, 2023
- Netball – 2025, 2024
- Australian Rules Football – 2025, 2024

== Publications ==
The school has a number of publications that are made available to the school community, including:

- The Rock, the Indooroopilly school's weekly newsletter
- Cornerstone, the Springfield school's weekly newsletter
- Plus Ultra, a magazine printed bi-annually
- The Review, an annual publication reviewing the previous year

== Chapel ==
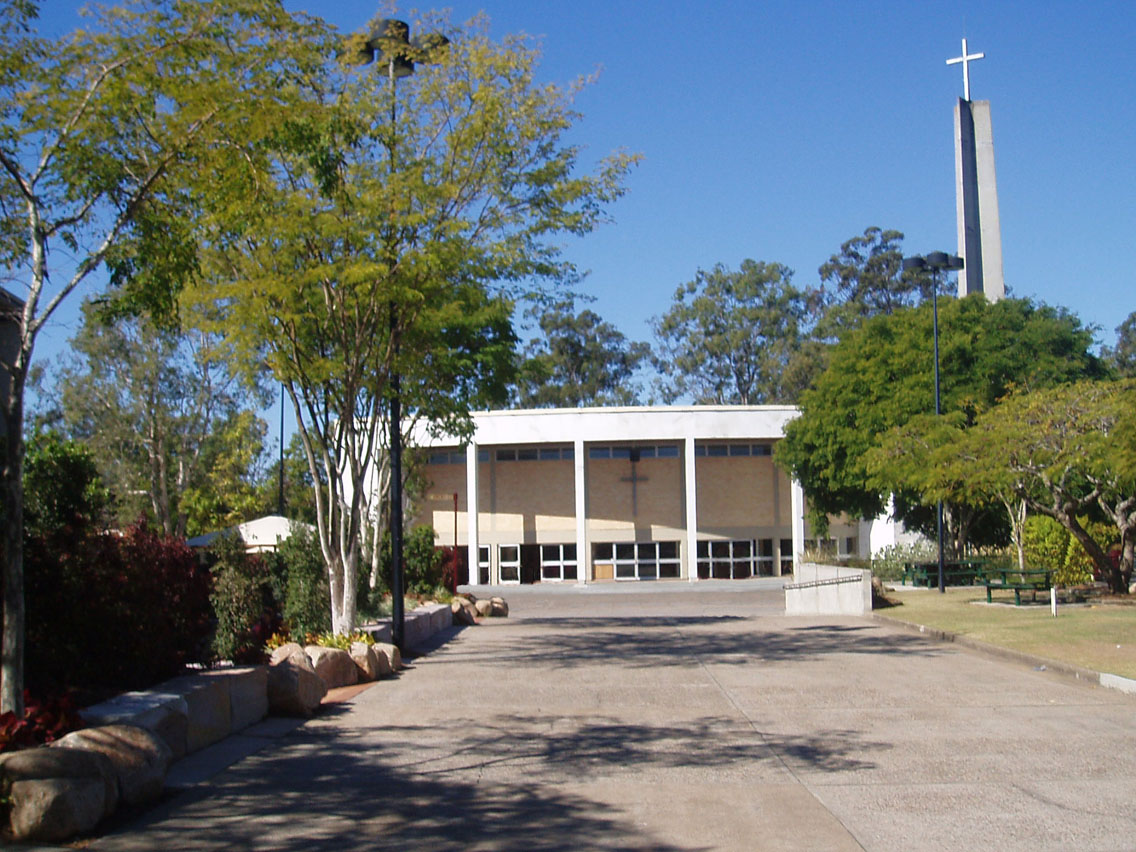
St Peters College Chapel

The St Peters Lutheran College Chapel was built in 1968 to a design of the Austrian-born architect Karl Langer. Langer's work was in a distinctive sub-tropical modernist style and was his last built project. The building has a large well-lit nave with a choir loft, organ, vestry, and meditation chapel and features a large bell tower. It is constructed of load-bearing face brick with a roof of flat metal sheeting.

== Notable alumni ==
Alumni of St Peters Lutheran College are known as Old Scholars. All students graduate as Life Members of the St Peters Old Scholars Association (SPOSA).

Entertainment, media, and the arts

- Sam Atwell – actor
- Ally Blake – romance novelist and former Brisbane Broncos cheerleader
- Stephanie Brantz – sports presenter
- Craig Horner – actor and musician
- Guy Edmonds – actor, writer and director
- Jake Sim – singer and member of South Korean K-pop group ENHYPEN
- Sigrid Thornton – actress
- Bree Tomasel – radio host and television personality

Politics and law

- Steven Ciobo – politician
- Michael Johnson – politician
- Noel Pearson – Aboriginal activist and lawyer

Sport

- Georgia Bohl – Olympic Swimmer
- Shane Gould – Olympic Swimmer
- Ariarne Titmus – Olympic Swimmer
- Ella Ramsay – Olympic Swimmer
- Jason Plummer – Olympic Swimmer
- Mollie O'Callaghan — Olympic Swimmer
- Jack Cartwright — Olympic Swimmer
- Jenna Forrester — Olympic Swimmer
- Kai Taylor — Olympic Swimmer
- Madeline Groves — Olympic Swimmer
- Eve Thomas — Olympic Swimmer
- Jaclyn Barclay — Olympic Swimmer
- Abbey Harkin — Olympic Swimmer
- Anahira McCutcheon – Olympic Swimmer
- Torrie Lewis – Olympic Track and Field
- Dane Bird-Smith – Olympic racewalker
- Chris Noffke – long jumper
- Maxine Seear – Olympic triathlete
- Pita Taufatofua – Olympic taekwondo practitioner and skier
- Mal Michael – Australian rules footballer
- Tia Molo – Australian Netball and PNG Orchids Rugby League player
- Heath Tessmann - Rugby Union, Western Force, Australia
- Wallace Charlie – Western Force, Rugby union; Australia national rugby sevens team , Rugby 7's
- Mark Harris – Australian Rugby League player
- Rod Hauser – Australian Wallabies, Rugby Union
- Moses Sorovi – Fiji, Rugby Union
- Kadin Pritchard – Brumbies, Rugby Union
- Vaiuta Latu – Queensland Reds, Rugby union

== See also ==
- List of schools in Queensland
