= Rescue: HI-Surf =

American action drama series

- Genre: Drama; Action
- Created by: Matt Kester
- Showrunner: Matt Kester
- Starring: Robbie Magasiva; Arielle Kebbel; Adam Demos; Kekoa Scott Kekumano; Zoe Cipres; Alex Aiono
- Composer: CJ Mirra
- Country of origin: United States
- Original language: English
- No. of seasons: 1
- No. of episodes: 19

Production
- Executive producers: Daniele Nathanson; Erin Jontow; John Wells; Matt Kester
- Producers: Carly Woodworth; Brian Keaulana; Terri Murphy; Joseph Incaprera
- Running time: 44 minutes
- Production companies: John Wells Productions; Fox Entertainment; Warner Bros. Television

Original release
- Network: Fox
- Release: September 22, 2024 – March 31, 2025

Rescue: HI-Surf is an American action drama television series created by Matt Kester. Starring Arielle Kebbel, Adam Demos, Robbie Magasiva, Kekoa Kekumano, Alex Aiono and Zoe Cipres, the series follows a team of lifeguards in the North Shore of O'ahu, Hawaii. Originally piloted for HBO Max in 2021, the series was then picked up by Fox and premiered on September 22, 2024. In May 2025, the series was canceled after one season.

== Cast ==
=== Main ===
- Robbie Magasiva as Harlan "Sonny" Jennings, an Ocean Safety Lifeguard Captain
- Arielle Kebbel as Emily "Em" Wright, an Ocean Safety Lifeguard Lieutenant
- Adam Demos as Will Ready, an Ocean Safety Lifeguard
- Kekoa Scott Kekumano as Laka Hanohano, an Ocean Safety Lifeguard
- Zoe Cipres as Hina Alexander, an Ocean Safety Lifeguard
- Alex Aiono as Kainalu Emerson, an Ocean Safety Lifeguard

=== Recurring ===
- Shawn Hatosy as Clayton Emerson, City of Honolulu Mayor
- Sea Shimooka as Jenn Lamonde
- Ian Anthony Dale as Sean Harimoto
- Hayley Malia Johnson as Julie
- Ka'enaaloha Watson as Ocean Jennings, Sonny's daughter
- Matt Corboy as Andrew Parker, the Ocean Safety Lifeguard Chief
- Nakoa DeCoite as Kenji Nixon, an Ocean Safety Lifeguard Captain

== Episodes ==
No.	Title	Directed by	Written by	Original release date	Prod. code	U.S. viewers (millions)
1	"Pilot"	John Wells	Matt Kester	September 22, 2024	T59.10101	4.77
2	"Mauka to Makai"	John Wells	Matt Kester	September 23, 2024	T59.10102	2.35
3	"The Deep End"	Loren Yaconelli	Matt Kester	September 30, 2024	T59.10103	2.09
4	"Kick Out"	Kevin Berlandi	Daniele Nathanson	October 7, 2024	T59.10104	1.98
5	"XXL"	Sherwin Shilati	Carly Woodworth	October 14, 2024	T59.10105	1.64
6	"Drift"	Avi Youabian	Ryan Martinez	October 21, 2024	T59.10106	1.59
7	"Pau"	Erin Lau	Devon Kirkpatrick	November 4, 2024	T59.10107	1.52
8	"Drop In"	Loren Yaconelli	Matt Kester & Daniele Nathanson	November 11, 2024	T59.10108	1.51
9	"Aftermath"	Andi Armaganian	Michelle Lesley Johnson	November 18, 2024	T59.10109	1.81
10	"Riptide"	Shaz Bennett	Carly Woodworth	January 20, 2025	T59.10110	1.71
11	"Caught Inside"	Loren Yaconelli	Daniele Nathanson	January 27, 2025	T59.10111	1.69
12	"Surge"	Shawn Hatosy	Ryan Martinez & Keiko Sugihara	February 3, 2025	T59.10112	1.90
13	"Depth Charge"	Loren Yaconelli	Matt Kester	February 10, 2025	T59.10113	1.79
14	"Ripple Effect"	Daniella Eisman	Jonathan Abrahams	February 17, 2025	T59.10114	1.60
15	"South Winds"	Andi Armaganian	Noah Evslin	February 24, 2025	T59.10115	1.41
16	"Pono"	Catriona McKenzie	Carly Woodworth	March 3, 2025	T59.10116	1.35
17	"Sea Change"	Avi Youabian	Daniele Nathanson	March 10, 2025	T59.10117	1.67
18	"Flowback"	Toa Fraser	Jonathan Abrahams	March 24, 2025	T59.10118	1.21
19	"Let Go"	Loren Yaconelli	Matt Kester	March 31, 2025	T59.10119	1.42

== Production ==
=== Development ===
In October 2020, it was announced that HBO Max had two new drama series in development, including a junior lifeguard drama series from John Wells and Animal Kingdom writer Matt Kester titled Ke Nui Road. It was to be produced by John Wells Productions, Warner Bros. Television. HBO Max ordered a pilot in June 2021. but passed on the project.

On April 28, 2023, it was announced that Fox had given a series order for the lifeguard drama, retitled Rescue: HI-Surf. Kester was expected to executive produce alongside Wells and Erin Jontow. Production companies involved with the series are John Wells Productions, Fox Entertainment and Warner Bros. Television. Kester was to write the pilot episode, and Wells was set to direct the first two episodes. However, production on the series was delayed indefinitely due to the 2023 Hollywood labor disputes. Production officially began after the strikes ended. On April 12, 2024, Fox extended its episode order to 19. Daniele Nathanson was also added as an executive producer.

On May 7, 2025, Fox canceled the series after one season.

=== Casting ===
The original cast was announced on November 9, 2021 which included; Robbie Magasiva, Tessa de Josselin, Andrew Creer, Ethan Rich, George Mason and Kekoa Scott Kekumano. In January 2024, Arielle Kebbel, Adam Demos, Alex Aiono, and Zoe Cipres were announced as the lead cast for Rescue: HI Surf, with Magasiva and Kekumano still attached. In addition, Sea Shimooka was added to the recurring cast. On May 7, 2024, it was announced that Shawn Hatosy and Ian Anthony Dale were cast in recurring roles.

== Release ==
Rescue: HI-Surf premiered on September 22, 2024, following NFL coverage, before moving to its regular Monday-night time slot on September 23.

Fox originally planned to air an episode of Rescue: HI-Surf following its coverage of Super Bowl LIX on February 9, 2025. However on November 18, 2024, Fox pushed the episode back to its normal time slot, and announced that it would air the third season premiere of The Floor in the post-Super Bowl slot instead (CTV, who televises both Rescue: HI-Surf and the NFL in Canada, still premiered the episode in the post-Super Bowl time slot).

== Reception ==
=== Critical response ===
The review aggregator website Rotten Tomatoes reported a 50% approval rating with an average rating of 5/10, based on 10 critic reviews. Metacritic, which uses a weighted average, assigned a score of 51 out of 100 based on 6 critics, indicating "mixed or average" reviews.

=== Ratings ===
Viewership and ratings per episode of Rescue: HI-Surf
No.	Title	Air date	Rating/share (18–49)	Viewers (millions)	DVR (18–49)	DVR viewers (millions)	Total (18–49)	Total viewers (millions)	Ref.
1	"Pilot"	September 22, 2024	1.1/10	4.77	—N/a	—N/a	—N/a	—N/a	
2	"Mauka to Makai"	September 23, 2024	0.2/2	2.35	—N/a	—N/a	—N/a	—N/a	
3	"The Deep End"	September 30, 2024	0.2/2	2.09	—N/a	—N/a	—N/a	—N/a	
4	"Kick Out"	October 7, 2024	0.2/2	1.98	—N/a	—N/a	—N/a	—N/a	
5	"XXL"	October 14, 2024	0.2/2	1.64	0.2	1.26	0.3	2.90	
6	"Drift"	October 21, 2024	0.2/2	1.59	0.1	1.27	0.3	2.87	
7	"Pau"	November 4, 2024	0.2/2	1.52	0.2	1.29	0.3	2.81	
8	"Drop In"	November 11, 2024	0.1/2	1.51	0.1	1.17	0.3	2.68	
9	"Aftermath"	November 18, 2024	0.2/2	1.81	0.1	1.07	0.3	2.88	
10	"Riptide"	January 20, 2025	0.2/2	1.71	0.1	1.32	0.3	3.03	
11	"Caught Inside"	January 27, 2025	0.2/3	1.69	0.1	1.12	0.3	2.86	
12	"Surge"	February 3, 2025	0.2/3	1.90	0.1	1.01	0.3	2.91	
13	"Depth Charge"	February 10, 2025	0.2/3	1.79	0.1	1.06	0.3	2.85	
14	"Ripple Effect"	February 17, 2025	0.2/2	1.60	0.1	1.02	0.3	2.62	
15	"South Winds"	February 24, 2025	0.2/3	1.41	0.1	0.98	0.3	2.40	
16	"Pono"	March 3, 2025	0.2/2	1.35	0.1	1.13	0.3	2.48	
17	"Sea Change"	March 10, 2025	0.2/2	1.67	0.1	0.96	0.3	2.63	
18	"Flowback"	March 24, 2025	0.2/2	1.21	0.1	1.23	0.3	2.44	
19	"Let Go"	March 31, 2025	0.2/2	1.42	0.1	1.08	0.3	2.50	
