= Zoe Cipres =

American actress (born 1996 or 1997)

- Born: 1996 or 1997 (age 29–30); Orange County, California, U.S.
- Occupations: Actress, model
- Years active: 2017–present

Zoe Cipres (born 1996 or 1997) is an American actress. She recently starred as Hina Alexander, a lifeguard on the Fox series Rescue: HI-Surf. She is also known for her role as Bonnie on The CW series Roswell, New Mexico, based on the Roswell High series by Melinda Metz.

== Early life ==
Born in Orange County, California, Cipres moved with her family to Hawaii when she was 6 years old. As a child, she aspired to be an actor. She would often write poems in her diary about being an actor or winning an Oscar. In her teens, Cipres worked as a model and would travel to Japan on weekends for work. After graduating from Mid-Pacific Institute, she studied acting at the William Esper Studio in New York City.

== Career ==
Cipres is currently signed to Brave Artists Management. Her first role was in the 2018 film The Pretenders which starred Jack Kilmer and Jane Levy.

In 2024, Cipres starred in the FOX series Rescue: HI-Surf as a lifeguard on the North Shore. The cast had to undergo rigorous training in preparation of physicality needed to portray lifeguards. Cipres is set to play a role in the upcoming film Long Pork which stars Lena Headey.

== Filmography ==
=== Film ===
Year	Title	Role	Notes
2018	The Pretenders	Allie	
2019	Just A Drill	Delaney	Short film
2021	IRL	Ella	Short film
2022	Maneater	Emma Stoudamire	
2025	Long Pork		Short film

=== Television ===
Year	Title	Role	Notes
2019	Grown-ish	Angela	Episode: "Girls Like You"
2022	Roswell, New Mexico	Bonnie	11 episodes
2024–2025	Rescue: HI-Surf	Hina Alexander	Main role
2026	Stuart Fails to Save the Universe	Chana	2 episodes

=== Stage ===
Year	Title	Role	Notes
2025	Kyoto	Understudy	Mitzi E. Newhouse Theater
