= Stuart Fails to Save the Universe =

American TV series

- Genre: Comedy; Science fiction; Action-adventure
- Created by: Chuck Lorre; Zak Penn; Bill Prady
- Based on: The Big Bang Theory by: Chuck Lorre; Bill Prady
- Written by: Chuck Lorre; Zak Penn; Bill Prady
- Directed by: Kyle Newacheck; Jonathan Frakes; Robert Duncan McNeill
- Starring: Kevin Sussman; Lauren Lapkus; Brian Posehn; John Ross Bowie
- Theme music composer: Danny Elfman
- Composer: Joseph LoDuca
- Country of origin: United States
- Original language: English
- No. of seasons: 1
- No. of episodes: 10

Production
- Executive producers: Bill Prady; Zak Penn; Kyle Newacheck; Chuck Lorre
- Producer: Paddy Cullen
- Cinematography: Anthony Hardwick; Grant Smith
- Editors: Lawrence Maddox; David Dean; David Canseco; Coleman Johnson
- Running time: 16–26 minutes
- Production companies: Chuck Lorre Productions; Warner Bros. Television

Original release
- Network: HBO Max
- Release: July 23, 2026 – present

Related
- The Big Bang Theory; Young Sheldon; Georgie & Mandy's First Marriage

Stuart Fails to Save the Universe is an American science fiction comedy television series created and written by Chuck Lorre, Zak Penn, and Bill Prady. The series is the second direct spin-off of the sitcom The Big Bang Theory, the overall fourth television series in the franchise, and stars Kevin Sussman, Lauren Lapkus, Brian Posehn, and John Ross Bowie. After accidentally damaging a device that Sheldon Cooper, Leonard Hofstadter and Howard Wolowitz created, Stuart Bloom is tasked with averting a resulting "multiverse armageddon" while encountering versions of himself and his friends (Denise, Bert Kibbler, and Barry Kripke) in different universes. The series is directed by Kyle Newacheck, Jonathan Frakes, and Robert Duncan McNeill.

Stuart Fails to Save the Universe premiered on HBO Max on July 23, 2026. In August 2026, the series was renewed for a second season.

== Cast and characters ==
=== Main ===
- Kevin Sussman as Stuart Bloom (and alternate versions, and himself)
- Lauren Lapkus as Denise (and alternate versions, and herself)
- Brian Posehn as Bert Kibbler (and alternate versions, and himself)
- John Ross Bowie as Barry Kripke (and alternate versions, and himself)

=== Recurring ===
- Ryan Cartwright as Kyle (and alternate versions)
- Josh Brener as Trevor (and alternate versions)
- Tommy Walker as Gary Jeffries (and alternate versions)
- Riki Lindhome as Ramona Nowitzki (alternate versions)
- André Sogliuzzo as the Adversary (voice)

=== Guest ===
- Brian Thomas Smith as Zack Johnson (alternate version)
- Matty Cardarople as Keith
- Louis Mustillo as Alexa
- Charlie Barnett as Simpa
- Zoe Cipres as Chana
- Joshua Malina as President Siebert (alternate version)
- Dean Norris as Colonel Richard Williams (alternate version)
- Jonathan Adams as General Adams
- Eric Allan Kramer as Victor Fries / Mr. Freeze
- Andy Ridings as Jay Garrick / The Flash

=== Special guest stars ===
- Kunal Nayyar as Raj Koothrappali (alternate versions)
- Penn and Teller as themselves; Teller previously portrayed Amy's father, Larry Fowler, in The Big Bang Theory.
- Kaley Cuoco as Penny (alternate versions)
- Christine Baranski as herself; Baranski previously portrayed Leonard's mother, Beverly Hofstadter, in The Big Bang Theory and Young Sheldon.
- Melissa Rauch as Bernadette Rostenkowski (alternate versions)
- Wil Wheaton as a fictionalized version of himself (alternate version)
- Mayim Bialik as Amy Farrah Fowler (alternate versions)
- Jon Cryer as Sherpa
- "Weird Al" Yankovic as himself
- Neil deGrasse Tyson as himself

== Episodes ==
No.	Title	Directed by	Written by	Original release date
1	"Spoiler: Gary Dies"	Kyle Newacheck	Chuck Lorre & Zak Penn & Bill Prady	July 23, 2026
In an alternative apocalyptic universe, Stuart Bloom is visited by his original self, who entrusts him with retrieving a device from Caltech created by Sheldon Cooper, Leonard Hofstadter, and Howard Wolowitz that can avert the catastrophe. Stuart is joined by Bert Kibbler, his ex-girlfriend Denise, and her new boyfriend Gary Jeffries, who is killed when they try to enter the university, now a warlord's fortress. They discover that Raj Koothrappali has been held captive for years and that the warlord is Barry Kripke, who wants to keep the universe this way to maintain his power. They manage to reach the device, but Kripke kills Raj before he can repair it, and Stuart damages it while attempting to repair it himself. Denise is left behind while Stuart, Bert, and Kripke are transported to a new, seemingly normal universe.
2	"Spoiler: Zack's in This One"	Kyle Newacheck	Chuck Lorre & Zak Penn & Bill Prady	July 30, 2026
The universe where Stuart, Bert and Kripke have arrived is in reality ruled by an AI that forces everyone to be calm and peaceful, or else a neural chip will give them electric shocks. Stuart finds the Denise from that universe and tells her about the quantum device, while Bert and Kripke try to track down Leonard and Sheldon at Caltech. But their constant activation of the chip causes the three of them to be arrested and subjected to a 30-month "re-education." Once released, they are captured by the resistance, led by alternate versions of Zack Johnson and Penny. Denise had alerted the resistance cell that they have a quantum device and also recovered the device after their arrest. AI drones find the resistance cell and begin attacking. Kripke activates the device to escape: Kripke, Stuart, Bert, and Denise are transported to a new universe where magic is real, and science is a crime, for which Bert is condemned to be burned at the stake.
3	"Spoiler: Bert Is Magic"	Kyle Newacheck	Chuck Lorre & Zak Penn & Bill Prady	August 6, 2026
Bert discovers that in this universe, he is a powerful magician and becomes the idol of the same crowd that intended to burn him. Denise flees after Stuart tells her the whole story and asks her to get back together. Kripke returns to the shop to use the device to escape, leaving the others behind, but he and Stuart discover that it requires magic to work. They turn to an alternate Bernadette Rostenkowski, who is a witch on commission, to help. She agrees if they provide the ingredients to restore her powers. Stuart, Kripke, Bert and Denise meet back at the shop, where they are attacked by alternate Wil Wheaton, who claims Bernadette is a demon. Bert defeats Wheaton, and Denise agrees to give Stuart a try, but Wheaton was telling the truth: Bernadette, in her demonic true form, is destroying the city and wants the device to conquer other worlds. Bert uses his powers to activate it, and all four escape. In the new universe, Stuart is hospitalized in a mental institution.
4	"Spoiler: Stuart Makes a Wallet"	Kyle Newacheck	Chuck Lorre & Zak Penn & Bill Prady	August 13, 2026
Stuart's psychiatrist is Amy Farrah Fowler, who doesn't believe his story about the multiverse. Learning that he and Denise are married with two children, Stuart slowly "recovers" and is released. Once he leaves the hospital, he learns also that he is a noted artist whose patron is Bert, and that Kripke and Gary are his married neighbors, none of whom remember their past lives. He finds a comic book titled Stuart Fails to Save the Universe, which explains that his original self caused the device to fail, that he must avoid an imminent multiversal collapse, and that this reality is false. He also finds an advertisement for the device, which he purchases and activates, thereby discovering, with the others, that they had been within a Matrix-style simulation. The next jump takes them to a forest where they encounter indigenous tribal inhabitants.
5	"Spoiler: Bert Gets Married"	Jonathan Frakes	Chuck Lorre & Zak Penn & Bill Prady	August 20, 2026
Civilization in the new universe is tribal rather than urban, based on values of radical sharing. The group is welcomed into the village by the natives, but on their first evening the device breaks. Bert falls in love with Chana and teaches her the concepts of monogamy, jealousy, and marriage, while Kripke teaches the tribe about private property and economics. Stuart finds a message explaining that the device requires red quartz to repair, but the person who has the only piece refuses to give it up because it is "his". During Bert and Chana's wedding, her former partner attempts to "redeem" the tribe and starts a brawl. In the chaos, Stuart recovers the red quartz and repairs the device. The group arrives in a new universe where humans are ruminants.
6	"Spoiler: Corn Is Delicious"	Jonathan Frakes	Chuck Lorre & Zak Penn & Bill Prady	August 27, 2026
In the new universe, humanity descends from cows, eating grass and chewing their cud as ruminants. Stuart and Denise decide to stay there and give the device to Bert and Kripke, so the group splits up. Stuart and Denise meet the Raj of their new world, who explains how the universe is collapsing and no one believes him or can do anything. The original Stuart appears, telling this Stuart that only he can save the universe and tells them that they can just order a new device. Denise convinces Stuart to accept his destiny. The two jump, following the trail of the original device, but find themselves falling into the void between the universes, where they find Bert and Kripke: without Stuart the two scientists' jump had failed, blocking them there. Stuart reactivates the device and they arrive in a world where humanity is telepathic.
7	"Spoiler: Dexys Midnight Runners Get a Royalty Payment"	Kyle Newacheck	Chuck Lorre & Zak Penn & Bill Prady	September 3, 2026
In the previous universe, Stuart also ordered the instructions for the device and discovers that the device is missing a piece that would allow them to travel not only between universes but also through time, thus preventing the apocalypse. They try to contact Howard Wolowitz for his help, but he doesn't exist in this universe, so they sneak into the engineering lab to steal the piece, only to find alternate, scientist versions of themselves, with their own machine which they had completed. A chase ensues through all the universes they had already visited, until the original group stops the alternate versions in the ruminant universe. The two Stuarts conclude that the original Stuart has independently assigned multiple alternate Stuarts to the same mission to increase their chances of success. They are joined by another group of alternate selves, consisting of military personnel, who steal the device from the scientist versions. The original group follows them to a universe where Pasadena is a war zone. To save themselves, they jump another time and arrive in a universe where the inhabitants are centaurs.
8	"Spoiler: We're as Confused as You Are"	Kyle Newacheck	Chuck Lorre & Zak Penn & Bill Prady	September 10, 2026
The group returns to the military universe to recover the complete device, but since it's too dangerous, they decide to instead attempt to jump back to the ruminant universe and be the first to steal it from their alternate selves. However, they are caught, imprisoned, court martialed for treason, and sentenced to death by firing squad. However, their accuser, Penny, offers them a deal: believing them to be enemy spies and the device a means of communication, she offers them their lives if they use it to transmit false information. Stuart agrees and takes the opportunity to jump, but mistakenly takes Penny with them, abandoning her in the centaur universe, while they return to the ruminant universe, revealing the paradox: the soldiers from the previous episode were their future selves, not alternate universe variants. However, the jump with the new device traps them on a comic book's cover, and an evil entity called The Adversary instructs Trevor and Kyle, frequent visitors of the Comic Center, to never let them out again.
9	"Spoiler: We Couldn't Get Green Lantern"	Robert Duncan McNeill	Chuck Lorre & Zak Penn & Bill Prady	September 17, 2026
Disobeying the Adversary's orders, Trevor flips through the comic book that Stuart and the others are trapped in, allowing them to move from the cover, where they are stuck, to the story inside, where they have free rein. Stuart realizes the comic is set in the DC Universe, specifically in Gotham City, and suggests they contact Flash and use his cosmic treadmill to escape the comic. The Adversary, after killing Trevor as punishment for letting them escape, sends Mr. Freeze to stop them, but they are saved by the Golden Age Flash, Jay Garrick. The quartet goes to Garrick's home, where Amy is revealed to be Garrick's wife. Using the treadmill, Garrick takes them back to the Comic Center in their home Universe, where they discover that the store is floating in a featureless void, from which comes the sound of laughter.
10	"Spoiler: Filmed Before a Live Studio Audience"	Robert Duncan McNeill	Chuck Lorre & Zak Penn & Bill Prady	September 24, 2026
Kyle explains to the quartet that the Adversary is the primal consciousness that created the multiverse but later regretted it, and when Stuart broke the Interferometer, he opened a breach in reality that the Adversary intends to exploit to end everything, provided they thwart his rescue mission. Kripke begins hearing the sound of recorded laughter and discovers a series of comic books on the shelves depicting their adventures, some apparently set in the future. Little by little, the entire group begins to notice and hear strange things, and eventually Kripke realizes they are characters from a sitcom. With this realization, the fourth wall dissolves into a thick fog. Passing through it, they find themselves in the backstage on a television set with a live audience, where their actors are introduced. Shocked and uncertain about their own future, the quartet leaves the studio and ventures out into the real world in search of answers. In the finale, Kyle, left behind at the comic book store, is visited by the Adversary.

== Production ==
=== Development ===
On April 12, 2023, it was announced that an untitled The Big Bang Theory spin-off was in early development at Max, created by The Big Bang Theory co-creator and executive producer, Chuck Lorre. The spin-off series was formally announced at the 2023 Warner Bros. Discovery upfront presentation by HBO and Max CEO and chairman, Casey Bloys. Bloys did not mention any plot details or who the series would focus on from The Big Bang Theory series, but it was reported that the series would have a new cast, with former The Big Bang Theory cast members to appear in guest roles. Actor and director Jonathan Frakes is involved in the show. Robert Duncan McNeill directs episodes.

In October 2024, it was reported that the spin-off would focus on Stuart Bloom, the owner of the comic book store, Comic Center, who appeared as a recurring supporting character in The Big Bang Theory. In March 2025, it was announced that the spin-off would be titled Stuart Fails to Save the Universe. In July 2025, HBO Max officially gave Stuart Fails to Save the Universe a series order. In February 2026, Lorre described the series as a "science fiction action-adventure comedy", and said of its creation, "I just wanted to do something that challenged me, that I was uncomfortable and in unfamiliar territory and the special effects stuff, the computer graphics, all those things. [...] Most of my career has been two people sit on a couch and talk."

In August 2026, the series was renewed for a second season.

=== Casting ===
In October 2024, it was reported that Kevin Sussman, Brian Posehn, and Lauren Lapkus, who played Stuart Bloom, Bert Kibbler, and Denise, respectively, on The Big Bang Theory would be reprising their roles from the series, and had also signed talent holding deals with Warner Bros. Television for the spin-off. In February 2025, it was announced that John Ross Bowie would be reprising his role as Barry Kripke, with Bowie also signing a talent holding deal with Warner Bros. Television. In August 2025, Ryan Cartwright, Josh Brener, and Tommy Walker joined the cast as recurring guest stars.

=== Filming ===
The series began filming in September 2025. Filming on the first season concluded in February 2026.

== Release ==
The series premiered on HBO Max on July 23, 2026, with a new episode debuting on a weekly basis.

== Reception ==
=== Critical response ===
On the review aggregator website Rotten Tomatoes, the series holds an approval rating of 78%, based on 43 reviews, with an average of rated reviews of 6.8/10. The website's critics consensus reads, "Stuart Fails to Save the Universe manages to brighten up its franchise through a genre-bending all-things-go sitcom that has the comedic chops to satisfy." Metacritic, which uses a weighted average, assigned a score of 62 out of 100 based on 19 critics, indicating "generally favorable" reviews.

=== Title sequence ===
Stuart Fails to Save the Universe received attention for its title sequence, which begins by breaking the fourth wall and asking the viewer to not use the "Skip Titles" function. The visuals of the title sequence change with each episode, and each episode features a new arrangement of the theme song by composer Danny Elfman. Series creator Chuck Lorre stated that the title sequence was created this way to encourage viewers to watch it before every episode, due to his distaste for modern streaming services allowing viewers to skip intro sequences.

Writing for Kotaku, Kenneth Shepard notes that the title sequence's visuals appeared to be possibly AI-generated. The show's creators have not said whether the title sequence is AI or not.
