= Ross Roy =

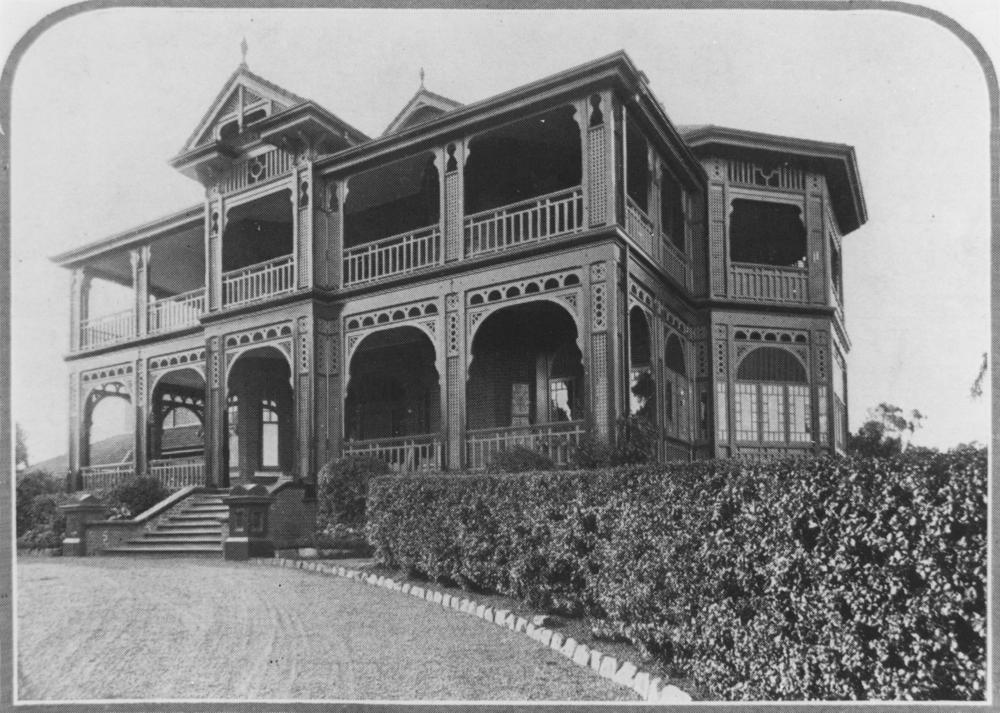
View of Ross Roy from the gravel driveway, 1922

Ross Roy is a heritage-listed former residence at 60 Harts Road, Indooroopilly, Brisbane, Queensland, Australia. It is within the grounds of St Peters Lutheran College and is currently used as school offices.

== History ==
The house was built in 1897 for Daniel Collings, a tea merchant, and his family. The architect was Claude W. Chambers.

In 1910, the house was bought by William Ross Munro, a pastoralist, who named the property Ross Roy being a combination of his middle name Ross and name of his eldest son Roy.
