= Legend of the Seeker =

2008–2010 American fantasy television series

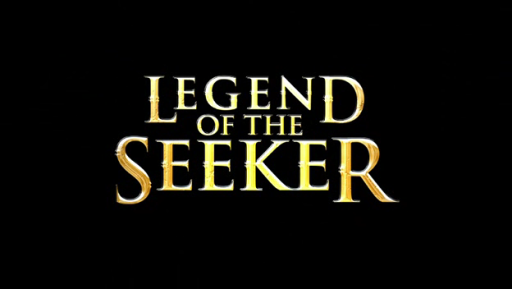
- Legend of the Seeker (logo)
- Also known as: Wizard's First Rule
- Genre: Adventure; Sword and sorcery; Romance
- Created by: Sam Raimi
- Based on: The Sword of Truth by Terry Goodkind
- Starring: Craig Horner; Bridget Regan; Bruce Spence; Tabrett Bethell
- Theme music composer: Joseph LoDuca
- Country of origin: United States
- Original language: English
- No. of seasons: 2
- No. of episodes: 44 (list of episodes)

Production
- Executive producers: Sam Raimi; Robert Tapert; Joshua Donen; Ned Nalle; Kenneth Biller
- Production location: New Zealand
- Running time: 42 minutes
- Production companies: ABC Studios; Paperboy Productions; Renaissance Pictures

Original release
- Network: Syndication
- Release: November 1, 2008 – May 22, 2010

Legend of the Seeker is an American fantasy television series created by Sam Raimi, based on the fantasy novel series The Sword of Truth by Terry Goodkind. Distributed in U.S. by Disney-ABC Domestic Television, ABC Studios produced the series for first-run syndication with Raimi, Robert Tapert, Joshua Donen, Ned Nalle, and Kenneth Biller serving as executive producers. The show premiered on November 1, 2008, and ran for two seasons before its cancellation in 2010.

The series follows the journeys of a long-awaited "Seeker of Truth" named Richard Cypher (Craig Horner), a Confessor named Kahlan Amnell (Bridget Regan), a wizard named Zeddicus Zu'l Zorander (Bruce Spence), and a Mord'Sith named Cara (Tabrett Bethell) as they defend the people of their realm against tyranny and destruction. While the names and places are the same, the story in the television series is different from that in the books.

== Plot ==
The story takes place in the world created by author Terry Goodkind in his fantasy novel series, The Sword of Truth. The three main provinces are Westland, the Midlands and D'Hara. Westland is separated from the Midlands by a magical boundary, which was created to prevent any magic from entering Westland. On the other side of the Midlands is D'Hara, which is ruled by Darken Rahl. Seekers are accompanied by a Wizard of The First Order and Confessors, an ancient order of women, who oversee the welfare of the people of the Midlands and the Seeker.

The first season is loosely based on the first book of The Sword of Truth series Wizard's First Rule. Some of the stories feature events and characters not encountered in the books, while others loosely adapt events from the book. The story begins after the invasion of Darken Rahl's army into the Midlands. Kahlan Amnell, a Confessor, ventures into Westland in search of a wizard and the Seeker, who has been prophesied to defeat Rahl. Kahlan finds the wizard, Zeddicus Zu'l Zorander, and the Seeker, a young man named Richard Cypher, who is forced to accept a destiny he never knew about. Together, they set off on a quest to seek out and defeat Darken Rahl.

The second season is loosely based on Stone of Tears, the second book in Goodkind's series. It tells the story of how Richard, Kahlan, and Zeddicus discover that their quest during the first season caused them to unintentionally help the Keeper of the Underworld create tears in the veil which separates the land of the dead from the world of the living. Their new quest is to find the Stone of Tears, seal the rifts between the worlds, and defeat the Keeper. They are joined in this quest by Cara, a Mord'Sith and their former enemy.

== Episodes ==
Season	Episodes	Originally released	
Season	Episodes	First released	Last released
1	22	November 1, 2008	May 23, 2009
2	22	November 7, 2009	May 22, 2010

The series premiered on November 1, 2008, in the United States and was broadcast weekly on Saturday or Sunday, depending on the local television station. It is based on the novel Wizard's First Rule. In addition to the 22 episodes of the first season, the series was renewed by Disney for a second season.

Filming of the second season started in July 2009; it was based on the sequel to Wizard's First Rule, Stone of Tears. The first episode aired on November 7, 2009. The season consisted of 22 episodes.

== Cast and characters ==
=== Main ===
- Craig Horner as Richard Cypher – The Seeker of Truth. When Darken Rahl sent his soldiers to kill every first-born son in Brennidon, Zedd helped Richard by bringing him into Hartland and giving him to George and Mary Cypher. In season 1, episode 1, "Prophecy", Kahlan arrives in Hartland to find Richard and Zedd. Zedd tells Richard who he really is - the Seeker destined to defeat Darken Rahl. Together, they stand to defeat Darken Rahl, but when they defeat Rahl, they caused a tear in the veil which separates the World of the Living from the Underworld and they have to find the Stone of Tears to seal the rift. It is later revealed that Richard's half brother is Darken Rahl and that he is to inherit the throne, which he decides to reject.
- Bridget Regan as Kahlan Amnell – The Mother Confessor. (Only named Mother Confessor in the first season, episode ten, "Sacrifice.") After Richard is named, she is sworn to protect him with her life and proves worthy to the team because, during battles, when she gets the chance, and when necessary, confesses people (uses her powers to put people under control) so that they can find out information and temporarily add someone to their team.
- Bruce Spence as Zeddicus Zu'l Zorander – The First Wizard and a Wizard of the First Order. After Richard is named as the Seeker of Truth, he swears to protect him with his life. He proves worthy to the team, especially on matters involving magic. When there is no one Kahlan can confess, he normally finds the right answer. He never rushes, always considering the consequences of his actions, and never fails to consider what has to be done. In episode 4 of season 1, he reveals to Kahlan that he is Richard's grandfather.
- Tabrett Bethell as Cara Mason (Guest Star Season 1, Main Cast season 2) – A Mord'Sith. She is the one who helped Richard kill Darken Rahl. In season 2, episode one, "Marked" when her Sisters of the Agiel betray her, Richard rescues her. After that incident, and realizing that Richard is the rightful Lord Rahl, both protect each other with their lives. Cara is always feisty and sharp-tongued and has the stomach to kill good people when none of the rest can. She approaches problems with the simplest, most direct and usually most violent solutions, often to the chagrin and amusement of the others.

=== Recurring ===
- Craig Parker as Darken Rahl – Richard's half-brother and the emperor of D'Hara. Darken Rahl once sent his assassins to kill every first-born child in Brennidon so that the Seeker may be one of the children killed and this can keep the "destiny" of the Seeker from being fulfilled, but Zedd escaped with Richard and raised him in Hartland. After that, Darken Rahl tries everything he can to kill Richard. In season 2, Darken Rahl forces Richard to resurrect him, and Rahl returns to the world of the living. After realizing that his defeat has also caused another threat which involves the prophecy saying that the Seeker will deliver the Stone of Tears to Keeper, he reluctantly join forces with Richard to destroy the Keeper for good, by sending the group of Mord'Sith in order to help Richard and the others reach to the Pillars Of Creation. In the original novel, Darken was Richard's father, not brother.
- David de Lautour as Michael Cypher (season 1) – Richard's stepbrother and First Councilor of Hartland. Michael always looked down on Richard and never told him his origin because their father, George Cypher, made him promise not to tell Richard. In season 1, episode 14, "Hartland", Michael is killed by a D'Haran while trying to help Richard and Kahlan.
- Brooke Williams as Jennsen Rahl – Richard's sister and a Pristinely Ungifted. As a Pristinely Ungifted, Jennsen cannot be affected by magic, nor can she use magic. In season 2, episode 21, "Unbroken", the Keeper sends the Sisters of the Dark to drink her blood in order to become immune to magic themselves, killing Jennsen in the process; however, this takes place in an alternate timeline.
- Tania Nolan and Gina Holden as Dennee Amnell – Kahlan's younger sister and a Confessor. From childhood, Dennee has always looked up to Kahlan. In season 1, episode 10, "Sacrifice", Dennee and the remaining confessors (except Kahlan) flee to Valeria with Dennee's son (a male Confessor), but the Mord'Sith eventually kill them all. In season 2, episode 7, "Resurrection", Denna and a wizard resurrect her, but she escapes them and lives with the child of the woman whose body her spirit had been put in.
- Jon Brazier as Thaddicus Zorander – Zedd's brother. From childhood, Thaddicus has always held resentment towards Zedd, since the latter had magic like their father, while he did not, and has gotten frequently into trouble. He has taken every opportunity to kill Panis Rahl, the man who murdered their father.
- Jay Laga'aia as Chase Brandstone (season 1) – The boundary warden of Hartland. Chase has always done everything he can to help Richard.
- Danielle Cormack as Shota - The witch woman of Agaden Reach. In season 1, Shota tries to help the team with her knowledge of prophecy and witch woman skills. In season 2, Shota tries to kill Richard and name a new Seeker because of the prophecy saying that the Seeker will deliver the Stone of Tears to the Keeper.
- Kevin J. Wilson as General Egremont – Lord Rahl's most trusted adviser. General Egremont has never double-crossed Rahl and will even lay down his life for him.
- Jessica Marais as Denna – A Mord'Sith. When she fails to break Richard, Darken Rahl gives her a second chance. When she fails again, Richard allows her to flee to escape Rahl's wrath. In season 2, episode 7, "Resurrection", she kills Richard and puts a trained D'Haran general's spirit in his body. Kahlan kills the general and a wizard and Cara resurrects Richard. In season 2, episode 8, "Light", Cara shoots her through the chest with an arrow and she falls off a cliff and dies.
- Elizabeth Hawthorne as Annalina Aldurren – The prelate of the Sisters of the Light. Ann will do anything to fulfill "the Creator's will". First, she traps Richard in the Palace of the Prophets, then she leaves him to die in the Valley of Perdition, and, finally, she sends a false Creator to execute him. Richard escapes every time, however.
- Jolene Blalock and Emily Foxler as Nicci – The former leader of the Sisters of the Dark. When Nicci fulfills a promise by the Keeper that he will protect her if she serves him, she becomes one of his most loyal and deadly servants. This changes when Richard convinces her that her strength is hers and hers alone and that she does not need to serve the Creator, Keeper, or himself. From then on, Nicci serves herself only and ceases serving the Keeper.
- Elizabeth Blackmore as Mariana – The current leader of the Sisters of the Dark. After Nicci leaves, Mariana takes over leadership. Marianna has never betrayed the Keeper and is very loyal to him. She appears as a recurring villain from episodes 39 to 44. In season 2, episode 22, "Tears", Richard eventually kills her with the Sword of Truth.

== Production ==
=== Development ===
Sam Raimi became interested in adapting The Sword of Truth novels after his business partner Joshua Donen encouraged him to read the books, and he in turn gave the books to Robert Tapert to read. Raimi considered adapting the first book into a movie or a five-part miniseries, but later settled on making a weekly television series after speaking to the books' author Terry Goodkind. A weekly television program would allow them to include most of the stories and important aspects of the series. Goodkind had resisted selling the rights of his books on multiple occasions before he met Raimi because he was not confident that other producers would maintain the integrity of his stories and characters. Raimi, who had produced Hercules: The Legendary Journeys and Xena: Warrior Princess with Tapert and Ned Nalle, saw this as an opportunity to return to the first-run syndicated television business. However, the syndicated television business had diminished after the loss of crucial foreign markets around 2000. But with the former minor networks, UPN and WB, being replaced by a still struggling The CW that may disappear, the timing seemed right.

ABC Studios agreed to fund the project and greenlit the production for 22 episodes in March 2008, after it was cleared for broadcast to stations representing 84% of the United States, with Tribune Broadcasting being the primary launch group. The show, which is heavily action-oriented and requires visual effects, was given a "network-sized" production budget of US$1.5 million per episode.

Originally named Wizard's First Rule (after the first book in The Sword of Truth series), the show was retitled to Legend of the Seeker at Goodkind's suggestion since the producers wanted to differentiate the show from the books, it would have been too restrictive for them to only include plot lines from the first book, and because this would allow them the opportunity to cover the story within all the books in the series.

=== Writing ===
Executive producers Raimi and Tapert intended Legend of the Seeker to be "just about telling the stories of these characters and the sacrifices they make for each other. Sometimes it's about the meaning of real friendship. And always, it's the stories of the hero's journey." Tapert added, "We didn't want to have the '90s postmodern attitude where the audience is in on the joke. Seeker is much more serious than Hercules and Xena."

With show's production based in New Zealand and a writing staff based in Los Angeles, one of the biggest challenges has been dealing with the time differences and the communication issues. Kenneth Biller noted that the biggest challenges the writing staff faced were to create standalone episodes while integrating the storylines and mythology created by Terry Goodkind, and to "honor the books without literally translating them". As such, the series contains some stories from the books and new stories and events created by the series' writers. Raimi's reason for the changes is that the structure of a novel differs from a weekly one-hour television program. Tapert and Raimi maintain that while the writers have had to create events that are not portrayed in the books, they have remained faithful to the characters, themes and overarching story of the books:

...I think the most important thing, at least for me, is that we remain true to the heart and soul of the characters, what they represent, what they stand for, the good things that they're fighting for, what are their weaknesses and how to overcome them, what the villain represents to the hero, the love story. Those will all be intact and brought as close as possible by our writers to the screen. The actual plot of it, though, happens in a slightly different order and sometimes different stories will be told, as depicted in the series of novels.

Goodkind released a message to his readers on his official website prior to the show's production, saying: "No series (or mini-series, or feature film) can follow the underlying book exactly. Sam Raimi and his team want to keep the TV series true to my vision, so rest assured that I am going to be intimately involved in the writing of each of the episodes." He added, "If you love the book just the way it is, then enjoy the book for what it is and come to the TV series prepared to enjoy the show for what it is." However, after production started, Goodkind released another press statement in response to questions posed to him by fans: "I want you all to understand that ABC studios chose not to consult me on actors, scripts, or any other aspect of the show," he stated. "I have had no input whatsoever on the TV series, so I am the wrong person to write to or complain about the show. If you wish to make comments, positive or negative, please direct them to Disney/ABC." He continued, "For my part, I trust in Sam Raimi and Rob Tapert to at some point be able to exert their immense creative talent and do a great job at bringing to life the characters we all love."

=== Casting ===
When casting the role of Richard Cypher, Tapert recalled that when he saw Craig Horner's audition tape, he "absolutely thought he was the guy, instantly". Raimi thought that although Horner is older than the character he plays (even though he actually is not), he was "very believable" and that "he's got enough good qualities in him, in real life, and he will probably make the audience believe that he's taking that ride towards making a responsible person and that growth of character that's so important for me in the stories of Terry Goodkind." Horner had not heard of the books prior to the audition, and was convinced by a friend to read the books and try out for the role.

For the role of Kahlan Amnell, Raimi credits Tapert for finding Bridget Regan, whom he saw on one of the audition tapes they received. Raimi thought that she grounded the fantastical situations by being "very human and real", and recalled, "I was moved by her and I believed her and I thought we couldn't ask for anything more." Like Horner, Regan had not read the books prior to the audition. Horner and Regan were brought together for a "chemistry reading" in Los Angeles, upon which the producers concurred that they had found their two lead actors.

=== Filming ===
Production was set to begin in May 2008, but it was delayed by six weeks. The series was shot entirely in New Zealand in high-definition. Though based in Auckland, filming took place in various places in and outside of the city: at Henderson Valley Studios, in the city's outskirts and in the mountainous region around Queenstown.

=== Cancellation ===
Tribune Broadcasting, the major station group carrying the show, decided not to renew the series on March 4, 2010, but according to a statement from ABC Studios, this was not a deciding factor of its cancellation. After an apparent deal with Syfy fell through, Ausiello Files reported on April 26 that Legend of the Seeker had been cancelled and would not return for a third season. Fans of the series responded by launching an ongoing renewal campaign titled "Save Our Seeker". Terry Goodkind expressed his support for the campaign.

== International broadcasts ==
In addition to the United States, broadcast rights for Legend of the Seeker have been picked up in more than 60 international markets. In Spain, the show began airing on Telecinco on March 15, 2009. In New Zealand, it premiered on March 29, 2009, on Prime and aired weekly in the Monday 7:30 pm timeslot. In the UK & Ireland, Syfy picked up the rights for Season 1 and Season 2 with the air time slot of 8:00pm starting on August 13, 2009. Irish broadcaster RTÉ One aired the show on August 19. In French Canada, the first season aired in 2009 and the second season in 2010 on Ztélé under the French title L'Épée de vérité.

In South Africa, the show was picked up by pay TV operator M-Net, broadcasting on Saturday nights since July 2009. In Germany, it premiered on October 11, 2009, on ProSieben and airs Sundays around 5:00pm. In Singapore, it premiered October 15, airing on Thursdays at 2030hrs. In Poland, it premiered September 4, 2009 on TVP1 and airs on Fridays around 10:00pm. In Australia, it premiered on Fox8 on November 29. In Italy, the show premiered on Sky Uno on December 8, 2009. In Sweden, the series premiered on TV6 February 5 at 20.00 local time. In Ukraine, the series aired on 1+1 channel November 14 at 12.30 local time. In Norway, the first episode aired December 28, 2009 on Tv2 Zebra Sundays at 20.00 (Norwegian time). In Philippines, it is also aired in Studio 23. In Sri Lanka, the show was telecasted by ITN. It started telecasting it from August 2013. It aired on every Saturday and Sunday from 6.00 to 7.00pm local time. It was dubbed in Sinhala and renamed as "සත්‍ය ගවේෂක" (Sathya Gaveshaka).

== Home media ==
DVD Name	Release dates			Ep #	Additional Information
DVD Name	Region 1	Region 2	Region 4	Ep #	Additional Information
The Complete First Season	October 13, 2009	TBA	January 5, 2011	22	The five disc box set may include all 22 episodes. Extras could include "Forging the Sword: Crafting a Legend", "Words of Truth: A Conversation with Terry Goodkind", deleted scenes, and audio commentaries. Running Time: approx. 950 minutes.
The Complete Second and Final Season	September 28, 2010	TBA	January 25, 2012	22	The five disc box set includes all 22 episodes. Extras include extended scenes, "Under the Underworld", and "Redemption of a Mord'Sith: Meet Cara". Running Time: 946 minutes.

== Reception ==
=== Critical reception ===
The series premiere, which consisted of the first two episodes, received generally mixed reviews from critics, earning a 53 out of 100 average rating as calculated by Metacritic. It was criticized for not being as "fun" as Hercules: The Legendary Journeys and Xena: Warrior Princess (also produced by Robert Tapert and Sam Raimi), and not having enough excitement. Another complaint about the show's premiere was its lack of distinguishing features and that it was "too derivative of other works" like Star Wars and The Matrix, with the "300-style" slow-motion action sequences often cited as an example. Brian Lowry from Variety called the show "a hodgepodge of better sci-fi/fantasy fare", while Ray Richmond from The Hollywood Reporter described it as "[b]ig on style but more challenged in terms of substance" with "too little provocative/evocative interaction aside from the ultra-violent kind". Diana Steenbergen thought that the series' third episode was "far more entertaining than the previous two that were weighed down with too much exposition."

Legend of the Seeker was praised for its high production value and the use of New Zealand exteriors, with Robert Lloyd from Los Angeles Times commenting that the show is basically "good-looking fun". Although both Lloyd and Steenbergen from IGN commended the performances of the lead actors Craig Horner and Bridget Regan, they were not pleased with the supporting performances.

=== Ratings ===
Legend of the Seeker premiered on the weekend of November 1–2, 2008 in the United States and attracted more than 4.1 million viewers over the two days. The first two episodes obtained an average of 1.5/3 Nielsen rating among 54 metered markets with a 1.4/3 rating on Saturday and a 1.7/3 rating on Sunday. In addition to improving its broadcast time periods in several top markets, Legend also improved the audience numbers in the key 18- to 49-year-old demographic in all airings. Over its first month of airing, the show averaged more than 3.6 million viewers. It was renewed for a second season after obtaining a 2.0 household rating average for its first ten episodes.

=== Awards ===
In 2009, the series won a Primetime Emmy Award for Outstanding Music Composition for a Series. In 2010, the series was nominated for an Outstanding Original Main Title Theme Music Emmy. In 2011, Costume Designer Jane Holland, Cinematographer Kevin Riley, and Sound Designer Chris Burt all won awards at the Aotearoa Film & Television Awards for their outstanding work on Legend of the Seeker.
