= Brooke Williams =

New Zealand actress

- Born: 3 January 1984 (age 42); Christchurch, New Zealand
- Occupation: Actress
- Years active: 2001–present

Brooke Williams (born 3 January 1984) is a New Zealand actress, best known for her role as Jennsen Rahl in Legend of the Seeker, Aurelia in Spartacus: Blood and Sand and Eva in The Almighty Johnsons.

== Early life and education ==
Williams was born in Christchurch, where she spent her childhood. At a very young age, she decided to become an actress and started performing in amateur theatre and attending acting courses.

She moved to London, where, starting in 2001, she trained at Mme Course, Acting for Screen and the Globe Theatre, joining its theatre company. In 2002 she participated in the Edinburgh Festival Fringe acting in Gogo the Boy with Magic Feet, for which she won a Total Theatre Award. After returning to New Zealand, she worked at the Court Theatre in Christchurch; she moved North in 2004 and graduated with a Bachelor of Performing Arts from Toi Whakaari: New Zealand Drama School in 2006.

== Career ==
In 2007 she moved to Auckland, where she joined the Auckland Theatre Company, playing the lead role in Romeo & Juliet.

Her television career began in 2005, acting in the movie Meet Me in Miami; then appearing in the television series Spartacus: Blood and Sand, its prequel Spartacus: Gods of the Arena and Legend of the Seeker. In 2008, Williams acted in a spot for Griffin Solay. Two years later, she won two NZ Herald Best of Theatre Awards.

In 2011, she appeared in the video of the song Myth Reducer by Sleeping Dogs and joined Shortland Street, playing Lana. In 2012, Williams portraited Aurelia in Spartacus: Vengeance again.

She resigned from Shortland Street in early 2013.

== Filmography ==
=== Film ===
Film roles
Year	Title	Role	Notes
2005	Meet Me in Miami	Waitress	
2007	Kissy Kissy	Erin	
2010	Predicament	Margot Bramwell	
2015	Slow West	Maria	

=== Television ===
Television roles
Year	Title	Role	Notes
2009	Go Girls	Wanda	3 episodes
2009–2010	Legend of the Seeker	Jennsen Rahl	Episodes: "Bloodline", "Fever" and "Unbroken"
2010	This Is Not My Life	Crystal	Episode #1.3
2010	Outrageous Fortune	Elena	4 episodes
2011	Ice	Milly	Television miniseries
2010–2012	Spartacus: Blood and Sand, Spartacus: Vengeance	Aurelia	Recurring role, 6 episodes
2011	Spartacus: Gods of the Arena	Aurelia	Episode: "Past Transgressions"
2011–2012	The Almighty Johnsons	Eva	Recurring role, 8 episodes
2011–2013	Shortland Street	Lana Jacobs	Recurring role, 204 episodes
2014	Anzac Girls	Sister Edith 'Poppy' Popplewell	2 episodes
2015	True Crime: Venus and Mars	Caroline Blake	Television film
2016-2017	The Shannara Chronicles	Catania	Recurring role
2016–2018	12 Monkeys	Hannah	Recurring role (season 2–4)
2019	Agents of S.H.I.E.L.D.	Snowflake	Recurring role (season 6); 7 episodes
2021	Love Knots	Jody Carpenter	Television film
2023	Power Rangers Cosmic Fury	Squillia Naire	Recurring role

== Theatre ==
Year	Title	Role	Notes
2001	Hansel & Gretel	Various	Court Theatre, Christchurch
2002	A Midsummer Night's Dream	Hermia	Globe Theatre, London
2002	Puff, the Magic Dragon	Little Jackie Parker	Court Theatre, Christchurch
2002	The Gingerhead Man	Ensemble	Court Theatre, Christchurch
2002	Gogo the Boy with Magic Feet	Various	Edinburgh Festival Fringe
2002	The Lesson	The Girl	Court Theatre, Christchurch
2002	The Cherry Orchard	Anya	Court Theatre, Christchurch
2003	Sleeping Beauty	Ensemble	Court Theatre, Christchurch
2003	South Pacific	Chorus / Nurse	Court Theatre, Christchurch
2003	Great Expectations	Estella	Court Theatre, Christchurch
2005	Mean Jean the Pirate Queen	Ensemble	Court Theatre, Christchurch
2007	Jack & the Beanstalk	Ensemble	Kidstuff Theatre, Wellington
2007	Porcelain Grin	Lead role (solo show)	
2007	The Pillowman	The Girl	Auckland Theatre Company, Auckland
2007	The Crucible	Mary Warren	Auckland Theatre Company, Auckland
2007	I'm Not Rappaport	Laurie	Downstage Theatre, Wellington
2007	Urinetown the Musical	Little Sally	Downstage Theatre, Wellington
2008	The Tempest	Ariel / Trinculo	Hawke Sea Scout Hall, Cox's Bay
2008	The Female of the Species	Molly Rivers	Maidment Theatre, Auckland
2008	Mr Marmalade	Lucy	BATS Theatre, Wellington
2008	Three Sisters		The Birdcage, Auckland
2010	Romeo & Juliet	Juliet	Maidment Theatre, Auckland
2010	Dog Sees God: Confessions of a Teenage Blockhead		Basement Theatre, Auckland

== Other roles ==
Year	Title	Role	Notes
2015	Path of Exile	Merveil	(voice) video game
2015	June	Jamie	Short
2016	A Woman's Right to Shoes	Alice	Short
2020	Dota 2	Hoodwink	Voice Actor

== Awards and nominations ==
Year	Award	Category	Work	Result	Refs
2002	Total Theatre Awards	Theatrum Botanicum – shared with the cast	Gogo the Boy with Magic Feet	Won	
2008	Chapman Tripp Theatre Awards	Most Promising Female Newcomer of the Year	Mr Marmalade	Won	
2010	NZ Herald Best of Theatre Awards	Best Performance	Romeo & Juliet	Won	
2010	NZ Herald Best of Theatre Awards	Best of Theatre 2010	Romeo & Juliet	Won	
2010	The Hackman Theatre Awards	Best Break Up of the Year – shared with Michael Whalley	Romeo & Juliet	Nominated	
2010	The Hackman Theatre Awards	Best Pash of the Year – shared with Michael Whalley	Romeo & Juliet	Nominated	
