= Maxine Seear =

Australian triathlete

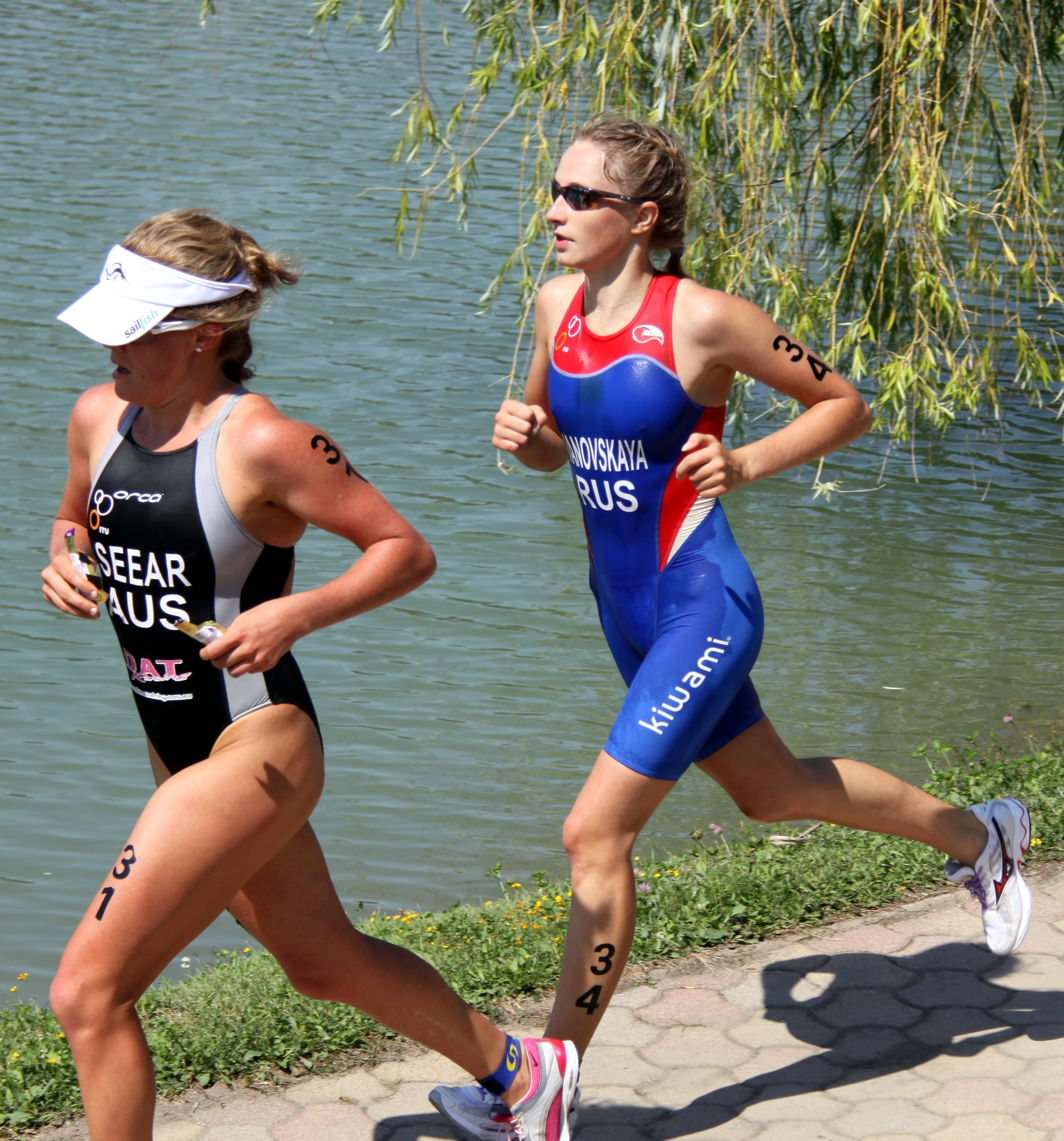
Maxime Seear (left)

Maxine Seear (born 18 December 1984 in Johannesburg, South Africa) is an athlete from Australia, who competes in triathlons. Seear competed at the second Olympic triathlon at the 2004 Summer Olympics. She did not finish the competition.

She attended St Peters Lutheran College in her high school years, a private school in Brisbane, Australia.
