= Adam Demos =

Australian actor (born 1985)

- Born: 24 May 1985 (age 41); Wollongong, New South Wales, Australia
- Occupation: Actor
- Years active: 2009–present
- Agent: Sophie Jermyn Management
- Relatives: Tyson Demos (cousin)
- Website: adamdemos.com

Adam Demos (born 24 May 1985) is an Australian actor. He is best known for his roles as August Walker on the American television series UnREAL (2018) and Brad in the Netflix series Sex/Life (2021–2023).

== Early life ==
Adam Demos was born in Wollongong, New South Wales, Australia. His father is of Greek descent. He attended Tarrawanna Public School and graduated from Dapto High School in 2003. He is the cousin of Australian basketball player Tyson Demos.

Although Demos was interested in acting at an early age, he first worked as a construction laborer in his father's demolition business, the Wollongong steelworks, a roofing company, and in Bondi's Hotel Ravesis. He enrolled in an acting class at Screenwise Film & TV Acting School in Sydney when he was 23, but was worried his friends would mock him so kept it a secret. His mother encouraged him to pursue acting.

== Career ==
In 2012, Demos played the role of 'Solo Man' in the iconic advertising for the Australian soft drink brand.

Demos previously played small roles in Australia. In 2017, Demos was cast to play Nate Baldwin in the ABC Australia drama Janet King. On set, Demos found out about a role in Hollywood explicitly written for an Australian actor. He was cast and flew to Vancouver to start filming the third season of Lifetime's UnREAL. Demos stated that it was a confusing experience filming UnREAL, his first international production, as it was a TV show within a TV show.

In 2019, Demos starred opposite Christina Milian in Netflix's Falling Inn Love which was shot in New Zealand.

In 2020, Demos filmed the Netflix series Sex/Life, inspired by the book 44 Chapters About 4 Men by BB Easton, in Toronto, Canada. Demos was cast in the show with the help of Stacy Rukeyser, whom he had worked with on UnREAL and was the showrunner for Sex/Life. To prepare for the scene where he sings "Heartbeats", Demos took singing and guitar lessons. His full-frontal nude scene in episode 3 of the series went viral on social media platforms.

In May 2022, A Perfect Pairing was released on Netflix, starring Victoria Justice alongside Demos. The film tells the story of an American wine company executive who travels to Australia to land a major client and ends up sparking a connection with a man she meets on a sheep farm.

== Personal life ==
In 2021, Demos revealed that he was dating American actress Sarah Shahi, his co-star on the Netflix show Sex/Life. In April 2025 it was reported that their relationship had ended.

His interests include cryotherapy, after first trying it in Los Angeles, and travelling.

== Filmography ==
=== Film ===
Year	Title	Role	Notes
2019	Falling Inn Love	Jake Taylor	
2022	A Perfect Pairing	Max Vaughn	
2026	Spa Weekend	Kai	
TBA	Princess	TBA	Post-production

=== Television ===
Year	Title	Role	Notes
2009	Home and Away	Justin	Episode #1.4914
2009	Rescue: Special Ops	Gilligan	Episodes: "Fire in the Cross" & "Eco-Warriors"
2010	Underbelly	School Kid	Episode: "Into the Mystic"
2013	Winners & Losers	Jack Bale	Episode: "How to Hide a Scar"
2017	Janet King	Nate Baldwin	Recurring role, season 3
2018	UnREAL	August Walker	Main role, seasons 3–4
2021–2023	Sex/Life	Brad Simon (main role)	14 episodes
2024	Rescue: HI-Surf	Will Ready	Main role
