= Falling Inn Love =

- Film poster
- Directed by: Roger Kumble
- Written by: Elizabeth Hackett; Hilary Galanoy
- Produced by: Robyn Snyder; Mel Turner
- Starring: Christina Milian; Adam Demos; Jeffrey Bowyer-Chapman
- Cinematography: Dave Garbett
- Edited by: Anita Brandt-Burgoyne
- Music by: Edward Shearmur
- Production company: MarVista Entertainment
- Distributed by: Netflix
- Release date: August 29, 2019 (United States)
- Running time: 98 minutes
- Country: United States
- Language: English

Falling Inn Love is a 2019 American romantic comedy film directed by Roger Kumble, an American film director, screenwriter, and playwright, from a screenplay by Elizabeth Hackett and Hilary Galanoy. It stars Christina Milian and Adam Demos.

Suddenly unemployed, San Francisco designer Gabriela spontaneously enters an online contest, winning a long-abandoned, run-down New Zealand inn, she teams up with bighearted contractor Jake Taylor to fix up and flip it.

The film was released on August 29, 2019, by Netflix.

== Plot ==
Gabriela Diaz, who already feels underappreciated in her San Francisco design firm, suddenly finds herself out of a job when it folds. Simultaneously it is the week of her break-up with her non-committal boyfriend Dean. He, after over two years together, still leaves nothing in her place.

Frustrated with weeks of work rejections, one evening after drinking copious amounts of wine, Gabriela enters an on-line contest to "Win an Inn" in the New Zealand countryside, and actually wins it. Thousands of airline miles later, she discovers the remote and neglected Bellbird Valley Farm boasts a crumbling facade, a floorboard-treading goat, a local meddling neighbor and innkeeper who covets the space, and a 1960s Land Rover. Charlotte, the owner of the town's only B&B, visits Gabriela and reveals that the previous owner's great-grandson entered the house in the "Win an Inn" contest to get rid of it.

On her first day, Gabriela finds she has a plumbing problem in the kitchen, so she drives into town. Initially she asks Norm at the hardware store if he knows of any contractors, he mentions Jake. They had already butted heads twice, so she immediately rejects this idea. After studying the blueprints, Gabriela decides to do an eco-renovation to restore the Inn.

Charlotte invites Gabriela to her inn for tea, mostly to ask her about the restoration. She makes her an offer on the house, explaining that she hopes to have a monopoly on the inns in the town but was cheated out of it. Gabriela firmly insists her plan is moving forward.

Gabriela soon finds she has been befriended by the café owners, Shelly at the garden center and Dr. Corey as well as Jake Taylor. They come en masse to help her when the rumor of her cold spreads amongst them. Gabriela slowly warms to Jake, and over several conversations finds out he is the nearby town's only restoration expert, chief volunteer firefighter and bereaved since his long-term girlfriend's death three years ago.

Gabriela and Jake work on the project as a 50-50 partnership, and in the process spend a day together that includes a kiss. However, in the evening she gets a call with a job offer. Jake leaves upset when Gabriela says she is considering it.

Once the final fixtures are hung, Gabriela is hesitant to leave. Her connections with Jake, the inn, and the inviting community that nurtured her creative side make her seriously reconsider moving on. Gabriela starts to talk to Jake about her doubts when Dean shows up unexpectedly.

Dean came all the way from the US after Charlotte invited him via text using Gabriela's phone. An attractive financial offer to buy the Inn is organized by him with a Melbourne, Australia investment company. This shocks Charlotte who planned to buy the Bellbird Valley Farm herself, thinking that Dean's sudden appearance would push Gabriela to sell the farm and return to her city life.

As Gabriela and Jake do a walk through with the interested buyers at the Open House, they explain the inn's eco-friendly details, both pointing out the other's contribution. It is deemed a labor of love. The Australian firm make them a high offer, which Dean pushes them to accept. Doing so, Jake leaves with Shelly following, and the plan to meet at the bank tomorrow to finalize.

Shelly convinces Jake to talk to Gabriela about his feelings. However before he can, a fire at Charlotte's B&B deploys half the town as volunteer firefighters. Jake has a near-death experience saving a guest. At the bank, Charlotte bursts in to interrupt the signing, confessing to what she did, and causing Gabriela to forsake her San Francisco life to remain in the community to run the inn with Jake. A final sequence oversweeps the restored property.

== Cast ==
- Christina Milian as Gabriela Diaz
- Adam Demos as Jake Taylor
- Jeffrey Bowyer-Chapman as Dean Conner
- Anna Jullienne as Charlotte Wadsworth
- Claire Chitham as Shelley
- Blair Strang as Anaaki
- Jonathan Martin as Peter
- William Walker as Norman "Norm"
- Daniel Watterson as Chad
- Simone Walker as Sage
- Arlo MacDiarmid as Dr. Corey Harrison
- Johnny Bright as Alan

== Production ==
In February 2019, it was announced that Netflix had greenlit Falling Inn Love starring Christina Milian and Adam Demos, with Roger Kumble as the director. It was filmed in Thames, New Zealand.

== Release ==
The film was released on Netflix on August 29, 2019.

== Reception ==
On review aggregator website Rotten Tomatoes, the film holds an approval rating of 67% based on 21 reviews, and an average rating of 5.7/10. The site's critics consensus reads, "Warm and welcoming, Falling Inn Love doesn't reinvent the wheel, but it will give those looking for a cozy new romantic comedy a nice place to lay their heads."
