= List of Lutheran schools in Australia =

Lutheran schools in Australia are educational institutions set up under or affiliated to the Lutheran Church of Australia. This affiliation is via Lutheran Education Australia, through its three district offices (Lutheran Education Queensland, Lutheran Education South East Region (Victoria, New South Wales and Tasmania), and Lutheran Schools Association (South Australia, Northern Territory and Western Australia)).

Lutheran schools are accredited by the relevant state government authorities in Australia under the various education laws in place. For example, in New South Wales, the New South Wales Department of Education approves non-government schools under the Education Act 2000 (NSW).

In Australia, non-government schools are generally referred to as "independent schools". This does not indicate that they are independent of the education laws of Australia, only that their governing bodies are managed privately. In all respects, they must adhere to the relevant educational standards prescribed in school syllabus preferred by each state's educational authority.

There are 1078 independent schools throughout Australia. The Australian Bureau of Statistics reports that there are 83 Lutheran schools which make up 6.4% of that total, being the sixth highest group when viewed by percentage of students attending.

Lutheran education institutions consider that the Christian Bible is essential in relation to educational subjects that relate to religious instruction or communal worship. For example, the specific prayer or devotions times for students during normal school time. However, Lutheran education institutions differ from some other Christian education schools by accepting that it is not always appropriate to apply biblical concepts to traditional curriculum areas, such as maths or science.

Lutheran schools attempt to place practising Lutherans and practising Christians of other Christian traditions first in enrolments. This is in contrast to some other Christian educational institutions, which take into account other non-religious criteria.

The following is a list of Lutheran educational institutions in Australia.

== Preschools, kindergartens & family day care ==
- Beenleigh Family Day Care Scheme, Beenleigh, Queensland
- Calvary Kindergarten, Morphett Vale, South Australia
- Carina Family Day Care Scheme, Mount Gravatt, Queensland
- Centenary Christian Kindergarten and Preschool, Middle Park, Queensland
- Concordia Lutheran Preschool Kindergarten, Murray Bridge, South Australia
- Good Shepherd Lutheran Kindergarten & Child Care Centre, Hamilton, Victoria
- Goombungee Little Folks Group, Goombungee, Queensland
- Grace Creche and Kindergarten, Clontarf, Queensland
- Grace Lutheran Preschool, Moree, New South Wales
- Living Faith Early Learning Centre, Petrie, Queensland
- Nazareth Community Kindergarten and Preschool & Early Learning Centre Woolloongabba, Queensland
- New Life Lutheran Child Care Centre, Browns Plains, Queensland
- Peace Lutheran Community Kindergarten, Cairns, Queensland
- Raceview Bethany Lutheran Community Kindergarten, Raceview, Queensland
- St James Lutheran Kindergarten & Child Care Centre Cleveland, Queensland
- St Johns Lutheran Church Kindergarten, Eight Mile Plains, Queensland
- St John's Lutheran Kindergarten, Geelong, Victoria
- St John's Lutheran Kindergarten, Kingaroy, Queensland
- St Marks Lutheran Early Learning Centre, Mount Gravatt, Queensland
- St Martins Lutheran Preschool Kindergarten, Mount Gambier, South Australia
- St Pauls Lutheran Child Care Centre, Nundah, Queensland
- St Paul's Lutheran Child Care Centre, Townsville, Queensland
- St Pauls Lutheran Child Care, Mount Isa, Queensland
- St Paul's Lutheran Kindergarten Inc., St Marys, New South Wales
- St Paul's Lutheran Kindergarten, Grovedale, Victoria
- St Stephens Lutheran Community Kindergarten, Gladstone, Queensland
- Trinity Kindergarten, Child Care Centre & Occasional Child Care Centre Southport, Queensland
- Victoria Point Faith Lutheran Community Kindergarten, Victoria Point, Queensland
- Zion Preschool Centre, Gawler, South Australia

== Primary education & secondary education ==
=== New South Wales ===
- Lutheran Primary School, Wagga Wagga, New South Wales
- St John's Lutheran School Jindera Inc, Jindera, New South Wales
- St Paul's College, Walla Walla, New South Wales
- St Paul's Lutheran Primary School, Henty, New South Wales

=== Northern Territory ===
- Good Shepherd Lutheran School, Palmerston, Northern Territory
- Living Waters Lutheran Primary School, Alice Springs, Northern Territory
- St Andrew Lutheran Primary School, Leanyer, Northern Territory
- Yirara College, Alice Springs, Northern Territory

=== Queensland ===
- Bethania Lutheran Primary School, Bethania, Queensland
- Bethany Lutheran Primary School, Raceview, Queensland
- Concordia Lutheran College, Toowoomba, Queensland
- Faith Lutheran College, Plainland, Queensland
- Faith Lutheran College, Redlands, Thornlands, Queensland and Victoria Point, Queensland
- Good News Lutheran School, Middle Park, Queensland
- Good Shepherd Lutheran College, Noosaville, Queensland
- Grace Lutheran College, Rothwell, Queensland and Caboolture, Queensland
- Grace Lutheran Primary School, Clontarf, Queensland
- Immanuel Lutheran College, Buderim, Queensland
- Living Faith Lutheran Primary School, Murrumba Downs, Queensland
- Lutheran Ormeau Rivers District School (LORDS), Ormeau, Queensland
- Pacific Lutheran College, Caloundra, Queensland
- Peace Lutheran College, Cairns, Queensland
- Peace Lutheran Primary School, Gatton, Queensland
- Prince of Peace Lutheran College, Everton Hills, Queensland
- Redeemer Lutheran College, Rochedale, Queensland
- Redeemer Lutheran College, Biloela, Queensland
- St Andrews Lutheran College, Tallebudgera, Queensland
- St James Lutheran College, Pialba, Queensland
- St John's Lutheran Primary School, Bundaberg, Queensland
- St Paul's Lutheran Primary School, Caboolture, Queensland
- St Peters Lutheran College, Indooroopilly, Queensland
- St Peters Lutheran College, Springfield, Queensland
- St Stephens Lutheran College, Gladstone, Queensland
- Trinity Lutheran College, Ashmore, Queensland

=== South Australia ===
- Calvary Lutheran Primary School, Morphett Vale, South Australia
- Concordia College, Highgate, South Australia
- Cornerstone College, Mount Barker, South Australia
- Crossways Lutheran School, Ceduna, South Australia
- Encounter Lutheran College, Victor Harbor, South Australia
- Endeavour College, Mawson Lakes, South Australia
- Faith Lutheran College, Tanunda, South Australia
- Golden Grove Lutheran Primary School, Golden Grove, South Australia
- Good Shepherd Lutheran School, Para Vista, South Australia
- Good Shepherd Lutheran School, Angaston, South Australia
- Immanuel College, Novar Gardens, South Australia
- Immanuel Lutheran Primary School, Novar Gardens, South Australia
- Immanuel Lutheran School, Gawler East, South Australia
- Lobethal Lutheran School, Lobethal, South Australia
- Loxton Lutheran Primary School, Loxton, South Australia
- Maitland Lutheran School, Maitland, South Australia
- Our Saviour Lutheran School, Aberfoyle Park, South Australia
- Redeemer Lutheran School, Nuriootpa, South Australia
- Salisbury Lutheran Kindergarten, Salisbury, South Australia
- St Jakobi Lutheran School, Lyndoch, South Australia
- St John's Lutheran School, Eudunda, South Australia
- St Mark's Lutheran School, Mount Barker, South Australia
- St Martins Lutheran College, Mount Gambier, South Australia
- St Michael's Lutheran School, Hahndorf, South Australia
- St Paul Lutheran School, Blair Athol, South Australia
- St Peters Lutheran School, Blackwood, South Australia
- Tanunda Lutheran School, Tanunda, South Australia
- Tatachilla Lutheran College, Tatachilla
- Trinity Lutheran School, Spring Head, South Australia
- Unity College, Murray Bridge, South Australia
- Waikerie Lutheran Primary School, Waikerie, South Australia

=== Tasmania ===
- Eastside Lutheran College, Hobart, Tasmania

=== Victoria ===
- Good News Lutheran College, Werribee, Victoria
- Geelong Lutheran College, Geelong, Victoria
- Good Shepherd College, Hamilton, Victoria
- Holy Trinity Lutheran College, Horsham, Victoria
- Lakeside College, Pakenham, Victoria
- Luther College, Croydon, Victoria
- Nhill Lutheran School, Nhill, Victoria
- St John's Lutheran Primary School, Portland, Victoria
- St John's Lutheran School, Geelong, Victoria
- St Peter's Lutheran Primary School, Dimboola, Victoria
- Sunshine Christian School, Sunshine, Victoria
- Tarrington Lutheran School, Tarrington, Victoria
- The Good Shepherd Lutheran Primary School, Croydon, Victoria
- Trinity Lutheran College, Mildura, Victoria
- Victory Lutheran College, Wodonga, Victoria

=== Western Australia ===
- Living Waters Lutheran College, Warnbro, Western Australia
- Ocean Forest Lutheran College, Dalyellup, Western Australia

== Tertiary education ==
- Australian Lutheran College, North Adelaide, South Australia
