= Carmel College, Thornlands =

Catholic secondary school in Australia

Carmel College
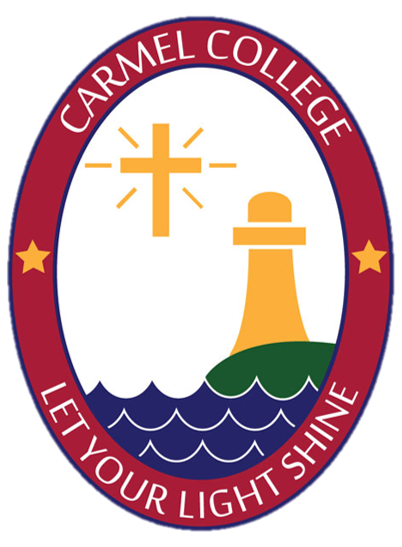

Location
- 20 Ziegenfusz Road, Thornlands, Queensland; Australia; 27°33′56.3″S 153°16′01.3″E

Information
- School type: Catholic, secondary
- Motto: "Let Your Light Shine"
- Established: 2 February 1993; opened 24 July 1993
- Founder: Faye Conley
- Principal: Stephen Adair
- Staff: 131
- Grades: 7-12
- Enrolment: 1250
- Houses: Avila, Champagnat, Mackillop, Polding, Romero
- Colours: White, navy and maroon
- Song: "Let Your Light Shine"
- Website: www.carmelcollege.qld.edu.au

Carmel College is a co-educational Catholic secondary college situated in Thornlands, Redland City in Queensland, Australia. Established in 1993 under Brisbane Catholic Education, the college is the only Catholic secondary college in the Redland City area.

As of 2020, 99 teachers and 32 non-teaching staff were working at the college with over 1230 students enrolled over years 7 to 12.

== History ==
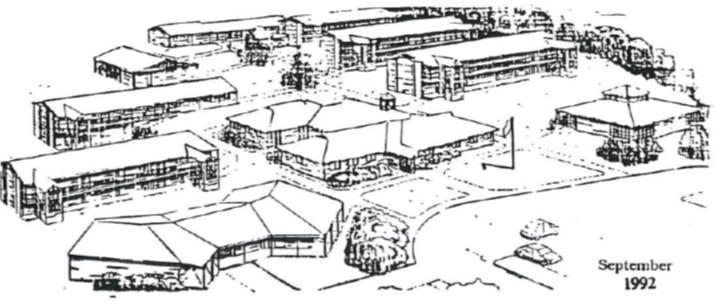
Masterplan Drawing of Carmel College (1992)

Carmel College, established in 1993 by Brisbane Catholic Education, is a Catholic secondary school located in the Redlands area. The school's foundation principal, Faye Conley, played a significant role in its establishment, overseeing the scouting of the location and construction of the initial buildings, with a total cost of $2.1 million.

The school opened its doors on 2 February 1993, with an initial enrollment of 80 students and 11 staff members, housed in four buildings. A blessing and opening ceremony took place on 24 July 1993, attended by representatives from the Queensland Government, Redland City Council, and Brisbane Catholic Education, as well as staff, students, and parents.

Throughout its history, Carmel College has undergone various expansions and developments. In 2006, Faye Conley retired, and Berenice McLellan succeeded her as principal. In 2010, the school underwent a significant expansion of its facilities. On 20 December 2011, the College library suffered severe damage in an arson attack, resulting in a loss of books, textbooks, and computers. However, the staff worked to replenish the lost items for the following year.

On 20 December 2011, the College library was burnt down in a suspected arson attack from gasoline spillage in a nearby locker. This greatly affected the college's library, learning support facilities, and counseling rooms. About two-thirds of the textbooks necessary for the next year were lost; the college's four library staff were able to replenish around 90% of the lost textbooks.

On 20 July 2012, Carmel College celebrated its 20th Foundation Day, marking the College's 20th anniversary. The large-scale ceremony and mass hosted at the school was led by Archbishop Mark Coleridge.

In July 2015, Carmel College hosted the 2015 Queensland Independent Secondary Schools Netball (QISSN) Carnival. The carnival was held at the Brisbane Entertainment Centre in Boondall.

On 25 August 2015, the college opened a new $3.1 million library. In addition to this, a new home economics building, an extension to the science building, and renovations to the former cooking rooms and visual art facility, were also built and opened. This $5.7 million expansion of the school's facilities was intended to help cater to the new Year 7 students.

On 20 July 2017, the College celebrated its 25th Foundation Day, marking the College's 25th anniversary. Foundation Principal Faye Conley, Quandamooka elder Aunty Joan Hendriks, past student actor Lincoln Lewis, Queensland Firebirds player Jemma Mi Mi, and local doctor Amy Heales attended the celebrations.

In September 2017, the construction of stage one of the new H Block Senior Learning Facilities began. This was completed in October 2019, which included the demolition of the tuck-shop building and construction of a new one and the construction of a new staff car park. This marked the completion of the 2-year multi-stage construction of the new H Block complex.

In 2018, Stephen Adair, former head of secondary at Emmaus College, Jimboomba, succeeded Brian Eastaughffe as principal of the College, as he moved to the role of principal at Clairvaux MacKillop College.

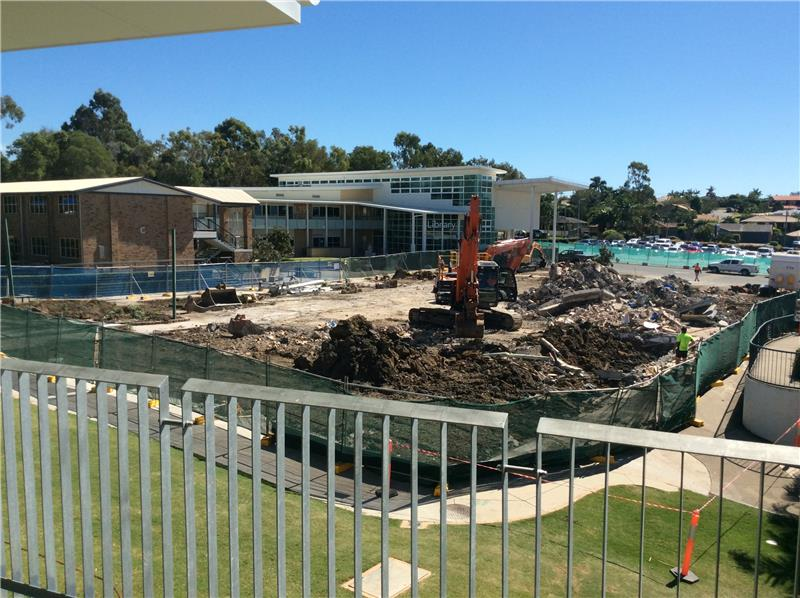
Carmel College administration building under construction (2020)

In late 2019 to early 2020, the original administration building was demolished for the construction of a new two-storey admin building, which was ultimately completed in January 2021.

In 2022, the College celebrated its 30th Foundation Day, marking its 30th anniversary.

== Culture ==
=== Namesake ===
The college derives its name from Mount Carmel, a place with religious significance in Christianity.

=== Logo ===
The college logo consists of a crimson oval with the image of a lighthouse on the inside. This oval represents the security of family and faith. The lighthouse is located on a green hill representing Mount Carmel, showing that students should be a beacon for others through leading by example in faith. In the top left corner, the glowing yellow cross represents Jesus, the focus of Catholic life. The stars on either side of the oval represent the light that shines upon us, with the college motto "Let Your Light Shine" inscribed upon the bottom.

=== Catholic identity ===
The College has a strong Catholic identity within its Carmelite and Marist traditions. This is reflective of the College's dual-charisms, Carmelite and Marist.

== Co-curricular activities ==
Carmel College offers co-curricular activities, which are divided into sport, arts and social justice categories.

=== Sport ===
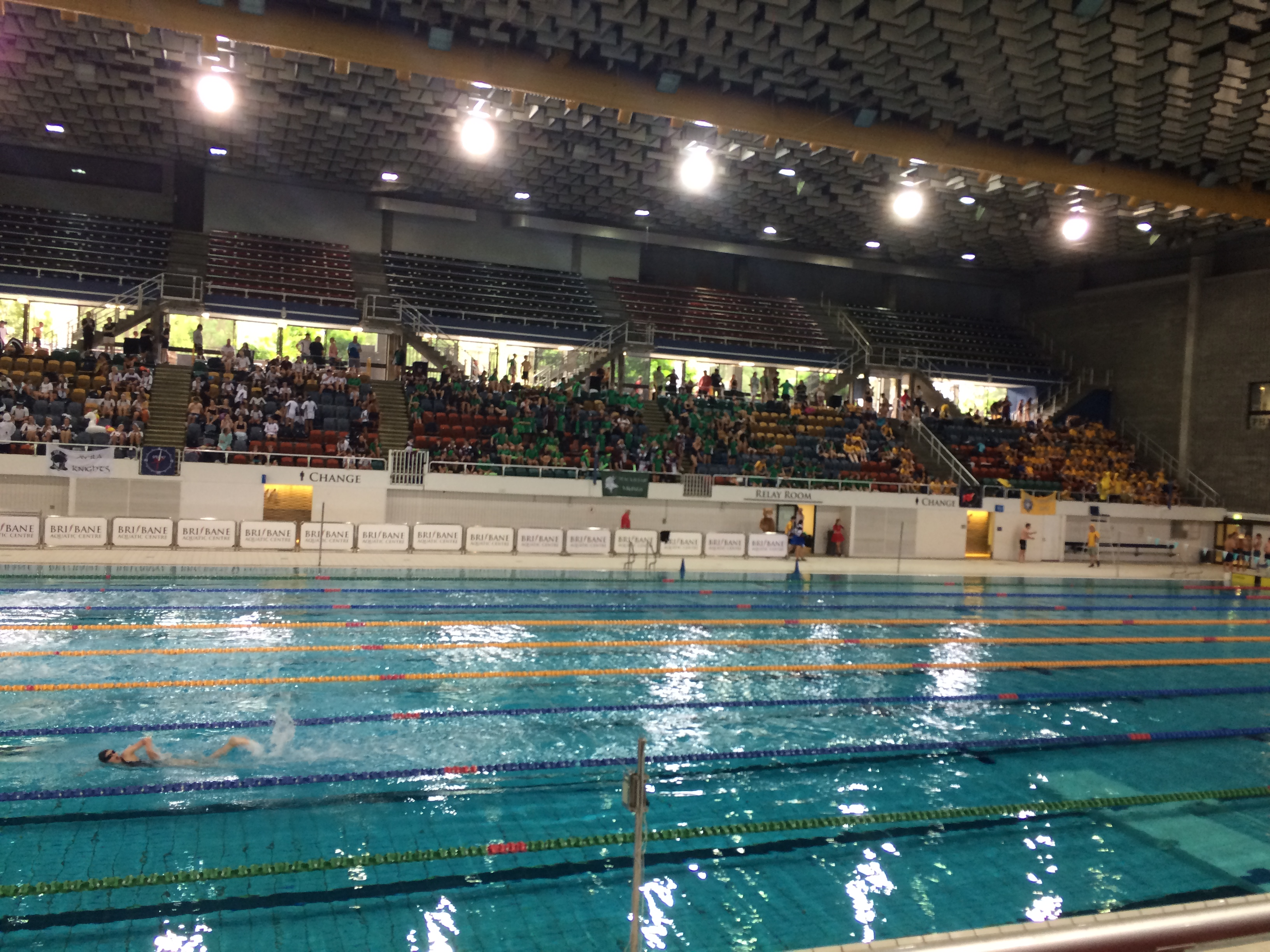
Carmel College Swimming Carnival held at the Brisbane Aquatics Centre at the Sleeman Sports Complex, Carina (5.2.2020)

Every year, the college holds the inter-house athletics, swimming and cross-country carnivals.

- The college holds its swimming carnival at the Brisbane Aquatics Centre at the Sleeman Sports Complex in Chandler during the first weeks of the year.
- The college holds its annual cross-country carnival near the end of the school year.
- The college athletics carnival is held over the course of two days at the conclusion of the second school term.

The college participates in several inter-school sporting activities at the local and state levels.

- South East Colleges Association Sport (SECA)
- Queensland Independent Secondary Schools Netball (QISSN)
- Queensland All Schools Touch Football
- Athlete Development Program (ADP)
- Bayside Districts
- Metropolitan East School Sport

=== The Arts ===
Arts Co-Curricular is the centralised arts program at Carmel College. It contains all areas of music, drama, dance, visual art, public speaking and debating.

Biennially, the college presents a large scale stage performance of a musical of choice. These are hosted in are years that end in even numbers. These musicals are performed at external venues, including the Redland Performing Arts Centre in Cleveland. Some of the previously-hosted musicals include:

- Freaky Friday (2024)
- Annie (2018)
- Peter Pan (2016)
- Oliver! (2012)
- Sherwoodstock (2008)
- Back to the 80's (2006)
- Little Shop of Horrors (2004)
- High School Musical: On Stage!

The college participates in the following special events:

- Queensland Debating Union
- Rostrum Voice of Youth
- Lions Youth of the Year
- The United Nations Youth Security Council Competition
- Optiminds

== Notable alumni ==
- Lincoln Lewis, actor (1999 - 2004)
- Jemma Mi Mi, netball player (2009 - 2014)
- Paige Leonhardt, swimmer (2017 - 2019)
