= Lincoln Lewis =

Australian actor (born 1987)

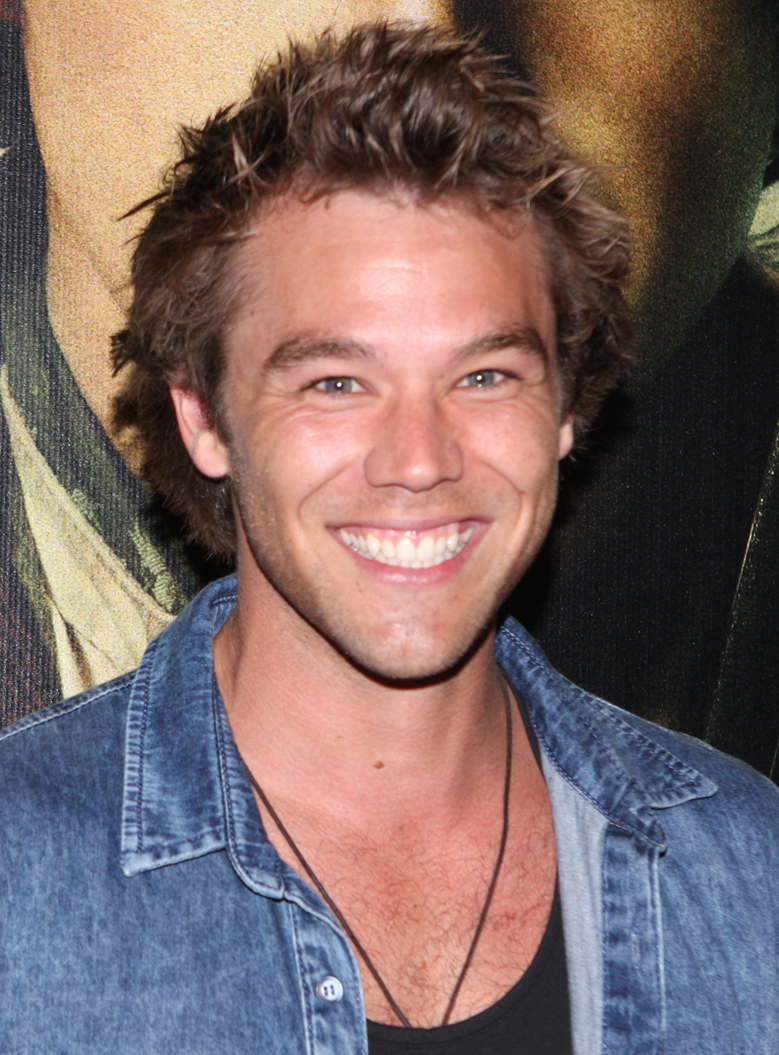
- Lewis in December 2012
- Born: Lincoln Clay Lewis; 24 October 1987 (age 39); Brisbane, Queensland, Australia
- Occupation: Actor
- Years active: 2003–present
- Known for: Home and Away
- Father: Wally Lewis

Lincoln Clay Lewis (born 24 October 1987) is an Australian actor. He is best known for his roles in the television series Home and Away (2007–2010) and in the 2010 film Tomorrow, When the War Began.

== Early life ==
Lewis was born in Brisbane, Queensland. He is the son of Wally Lewis, an Australian former rugby league football captain and former sports presenter on Nine News Queensland, and Jacqueline Lewis. Lewis has two siblings, an older brother Mitchell and a younger sister Jamie-Lee. He attended St Anthony's Catholic Primary School in Alexandra Hills and Carmel College in Thornlands. He also revealed that Wally and his brother (Lincoln's uncle) were butchers by trade.

== Career ==
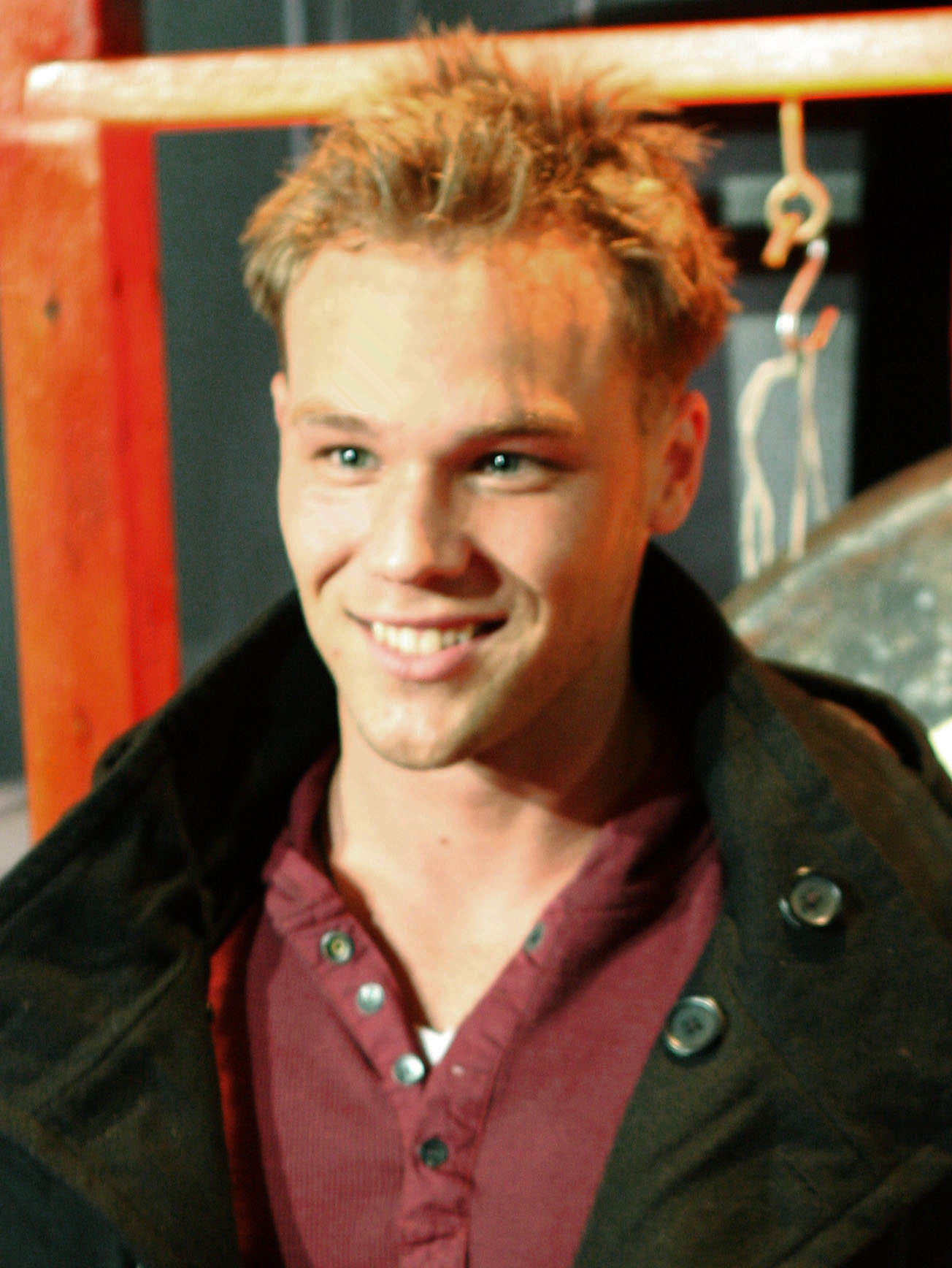
Lewis in June 2011

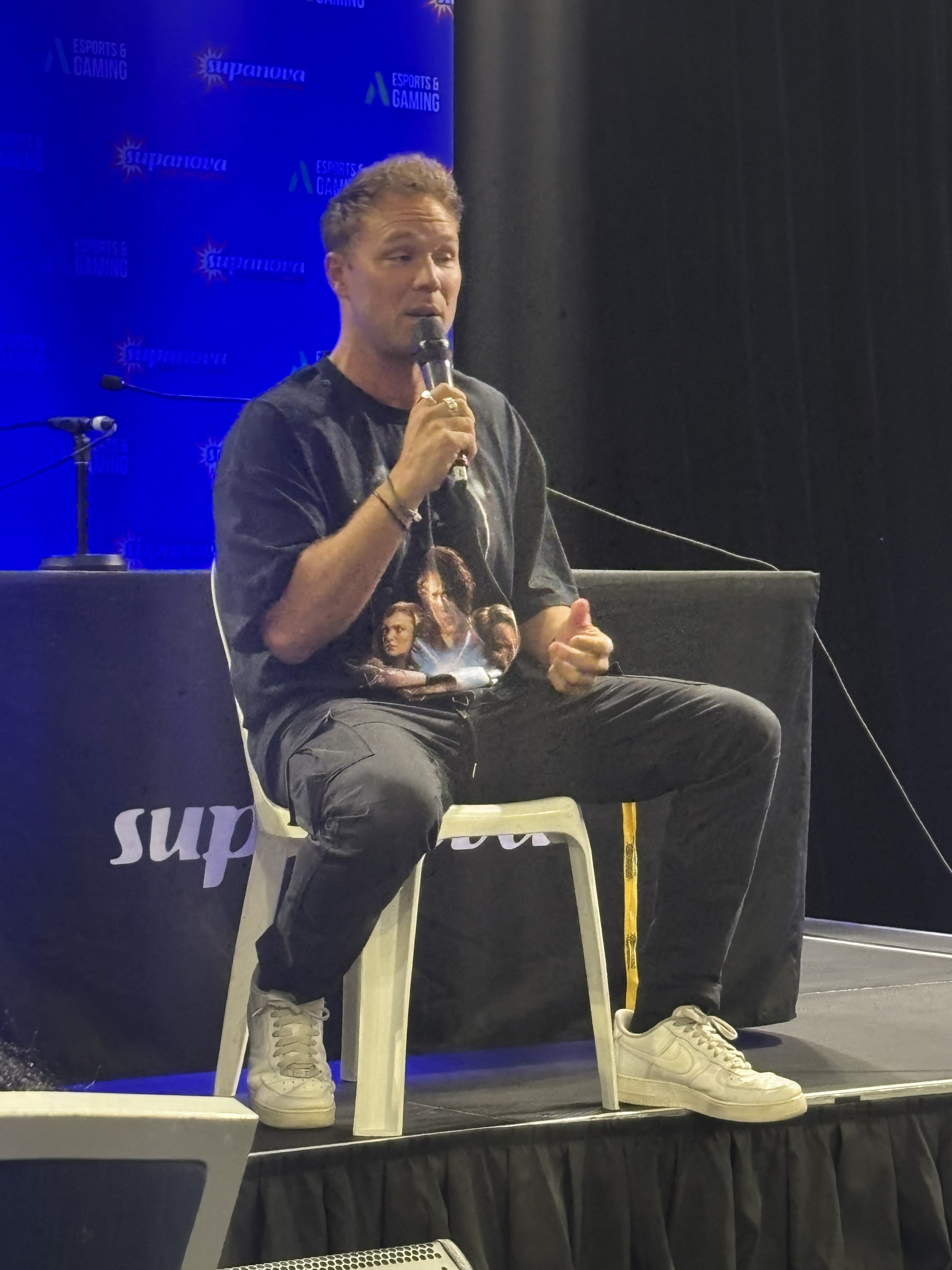
Lewis speaking to fans at the Supanova Expo in Sydney in June 2026.

Lewis began acting at the age of thirteen. Lewis has since continued to appear in television shows such as H_{2}O: Just Add Water, The Sleepover Club, Rescue: Special Ops and Mortified. In 2005, Lewis made his film debut in a bit role in the film Aquamarine. That same year Lewis starred in the low budget Australian horror film Voodoo Lagoon as Aaron. The film starred John Noble, Natalie Blair and Erika Heynatz and followed a group of college students who take a deadly vacation to a remote exotic island.

In 2007, Lewis was cast in the Seven Network soap opera Home and Away as Geoff Campbell. Lewis made his debut on the series in June 2007 and it is considered his breakout role. In 2008, Lewis won the Most Popular New Male Talent award at the 2008 Logie Awards. On June 5, 2009, it was announced Lewis would be one of the eleven celebrity contestants in the ninth series of Dancing with the Stars. On the same day of the aforementioned announcement, it was revealed that the 21-year-old Lewis had recorded a sex tape with an 18-year-old actress on his phone; the video was shown to some Home and Away colleagues but was not publicly disseminated. Lewis was eliminated from Dancing with the Stars on 23 August 2009, finishing in seventh place in the competition.

In September of that year, Lewis announced he was leaving Home and Away to pursue other opportunities. Lewis made his final appearance on 12 February 2010. To date he has appeared in 567 episodes of the show.

In mid-September 2009, Lewis was cast in the Paramount Pictures Action Adventure film Tomorrow, When the War Began. The film, which is an adaptation of the novel series of the same name, began production a week after Lewis' departure from Home and Away. Lewis portrayed the character Kevin Holmes and the film centres on a group of teenagers waging a guerrilla war against an invading foreign power in their fictional hometown of Wirrawee. The film was released in September 2010 to a mixed response from critics, but had large success with public audiences and went on to gross over $13 million in Australia alone. A sequel has been rumoured to be in the development stages and Lewis has expressed interest in returning.

In early 2010, Lewis starred in the Nine Network drama Rescue: Special Ops playing Sam Marchello, son of Vince Marchello, played by veteran Australian actor Peter Phelps. Lewis also starred in the independent drama film 33 Postcards alongside Guy Pearce and Claudia Karvan. The film went on to be the biggest release of an Australian film in China to date, receiving critical acclaim. Lewis also received the inaugural "Male Star of Tomorrow" Award at the 2011 Australian International Movie Convention on the Gold Coast. In July 2010, Lewis once again joined the Nine Network to star in Crime Drama television series Underbelly: Razor as Bruce Higgs. The role required Lewis to perform his first onscreen nude scene.

In October 2010, Lewis was cast in the Australian ensemble horror film Bait 3D. The film, which also stars Xavier Samuel and Sharni Vinson, required Lewis to return to his home state Queensland. The film follows a group of people trapped in a supermarket with a group of great white sharks after a freak tsunami. Lewis was also cast in a recurring role on the Foxtel television teen drama SLiDE. Lewis portrayed the role of Dylan Gallagher, the temperamental older brother to Brenton Thwaites' character Luke Gallagher.

In September 2011, Ten Network announced Lewis had signed on to a four-week stint on the soap opera Neighbours. Lewis played the role of Dominic Emmerson, a marine biologist. Colin Vickery of the Herald Sun praised his performance, saying he "brings a wonderful lightness of touch to his Neighbours role." Ten reportedly offered Lewis a one-year deal with the series to continue his role as a regular but Lewis declined.

In November 2011, Lewis was cast in a regular role on the Nine Network drama television series Tricky Business. The series centres on a family that runs a debt collection business. Lewis plays the role of the womanising Chad Henderson, who usually finds himself in comedic dilemmas when pursuing clients. Nine ordered a 13-episode first season with plans to extend the season depending on the audiences' reception. The series premiere aired on 14 May 2012 to 1.16 million viewers.

In March 2012, it was announced that Lewis had been cast in his first international high-profile role after travelling to the US for the 2012–2013 television pilot season. Lewis appeared in the M. Night Shyamalan film After Earth, which was released in May 2013 and starred Will Smith and Jaden Smith. The film followed a father and son who crash land and explore a planet.

Early during the 2013 US pilot season, Lewis was cast in ABC and Warner Bros. drama television pilot Westside directed by McG. The show revolves around the haves and have-nots of Venice, Los Angeles and focuses on two rival families battling over the surfing soul of Venice in a classic story of Romeo and Juliet, also starring Jennifer Beals and Bruce Greenwood. Westside however was not picked up to go to series.

In January 2014, it was announced that Lewis had been cast in the third season of Channel 9's family drama House Husbands and would begin filming in late January. On 3 March 2014, Channel 9 announced that while filming House Husbands Lewis had also been cast and had begun filming the World War 1 epic mini series Gallipoli, directed by Glendyn Ivin which aired in 2015.

In 2017, Lewis appeared as a celebrity contestant on the Australian version of Hell's Kitchen. Lewis was an ambassador for the 2020 MEN-tality project and Beyond Blue, raising awareness for mental health concerns amongst men alongside Rodger Corser, Human Nature, Alex Cubis and Lincoln Younes.

In 2021, during the 18th season of Dancing with the Stars, Lewis competed for a second season, finishing equal 3rd overall (out of 14 pairs).

In 2022, Lewis appeared as a celebrity contestant on the Christmas special for Lego Masters Australia. The following year, Lewis began filming romantic comedy feature He Loves Me Not opposite Rhiannon Fish on K'gari and Hervey Bay, Queensland.

In March 2026, Lewis was named in the cast for the film Love, Wine & Valentine.

== Identity Theft ==
In 2013, Lewis warned fans that he was being impersonated online. He later revealed his identity had been stolen and used to catfish women. Lydia Abdelmalek obtained Lewis's personal information, including his address, phone number and a copy of his driver's licence; and used these to impersonate him and stalk women online. One of the women she targeted was a childhood friend of Lewis who subsequently committed suicide as a result of years of harassment and manipulation. Abdelmalek was convicted of stalking six people and was sentenced to 2 years and 8 months jail in 2019, which was increased to 4 years after her appeal failed in 2022.

== Filmography ==
=== Film ===
Title	Year	Role	Notes
2006	Aquamarine	Theo	
2006	Voodoo Lagoon	Aaron	
2010	Tomorrow, When the War Began	Kevin Holmes	
2010	33 Postcards	Carl	
2012	Bait 3D	Kyle	
2013	After Earth	Running Cadet	
2016	Spin Out	Nic	
2019	Danger Close: The Battle of Long Tan	Private Kevin Graham	
2021	The Possessed	Liam Chandler	
2022	Black Site	Landon Briggs	
2024	Land of Bad	Young Airman	
2024	He Loves Me Not	Adam	
2025	Hagar's Hut	Xan	
2025	Primitive War	Zimmer	
2026	Love, Wine & Valentine	Brody	

=== Television ===
Title	Year	Role	Notes
2003	The Sleepover Club	Extra (uncredited)	2 episodes
2006, 2007	Mortified	Andre / Talking Shoe Face	2 episodes
2007–2010	Home and Away	Geoff Campbell	Main role
2008	Saturday Disney	Himself	1 episode
2008	H_{2}O: Just Add Water	School Friend	Episode: "Three's Company"
2009, 2021	Dancing with the Stars	Himself, contestant	Season 9 Season 18 All Star
2010	Rescue: Special Ops	Sam Marcello	Episode: "Street Legal"
2010	Event TV	Himself, presenter	
2010	Talkin' 'Bout Your Generation	Himself, guest panelist	
2011	SLiDE	Dylan Gallagher	4 episodes
2011	Underbelly: Razor	Bruce Higgs	3 episodes
2011	Australia's Next Top Model	Himself, Celebrity guest model	Season 7, episode 8
2012	Neighbours	Dominic Emmerson	8 episodes
2012	Tricky Business	Chad Henderson	13 episodes
2013	Westside	Shealy Carver	Pilot
2014	House Husbands	Ned	9 episodes
2015	Gallipoli	Chook Dutton	Miniseries
2017	Hell's Kitchen Australia	Himself, contestant	
2022	Lego Masters Australia	Himself, contestant	Christmas special
2022	Darby and Joan	Brad	Episode #1.4
2025	Good Cop/Bad Cop	Bobby Dougan	3 episodes
2025	NCIS:Sydney	Vinnie Reeves	1 episode

== Awards and nominations ==
Year	Award	Category	Result	Ref(s)
2007	Dolly Teen Choice Awards	King of Teen	Won	
2008	Logie Awards	Most Popular New Male Talent	Won	
2009	Dolly Teen Choice Awards	Favourite Aussie	Nominated	
