= Tallebudgera Post Office =

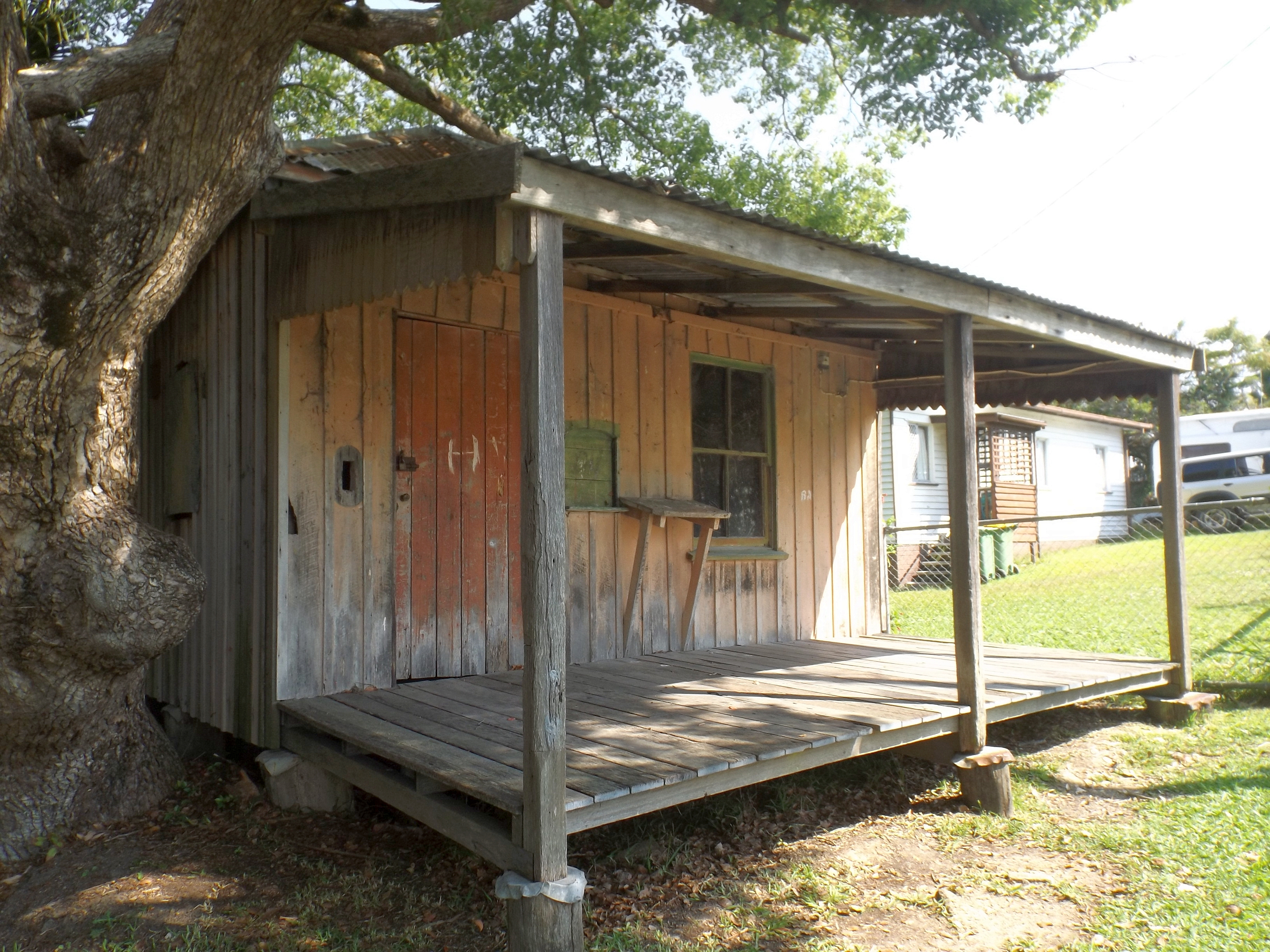
- Building in 2015

- Location within Queensland Location within Australia
- 28.1416°S 153.4272°E
- Location: 17 Trees Road, Tallebudgera, Queensland, Australia

Queensland Heritage Register
- Official name: Tallebudgera Post Office (former)
- Type: state heritage (built)
- Designated: 1 October 2007
- Reference no.: 602624
- Significant period: 1870s

Tallebudgera Post Office is a heritage-listed former post office at 17 Trees Road, Tallebudgera, Queensland, Australia. It was added to the Queensland Heritage Register on 1 October 2007.

== History ==
The former Tallebudgera Post Office was officially opened in 1878 and was in operation until March 1958. It was a privately owned and built building. Tallebudgera was located along the main stock route between Queensland and New South Wales and was a stopover point for the Cobb and Co. Coaches. In 2002, the deteriorating property was purchased and restored by the Gold Coast City Council (GCCC). The GCCC now maintains the site as a museum piece for educational and historical purposes.

Settlement of the Gold Coast area by Europeans began in the hinterland with the harvesting of cedar timber which was shipped south to Sydney or north to Brisbane. Timber getters began moving through the heavily forested Tallebudgera area in the mid 1840s opening the way for the early settlers who came when land runs began to be granted from the 1850s. By the early 1870s, the Tallebudgera area was permanently settled. The population mainly consisted of timber getters and small crop farmers with dairy farming becoming important in the area from the 1890s.

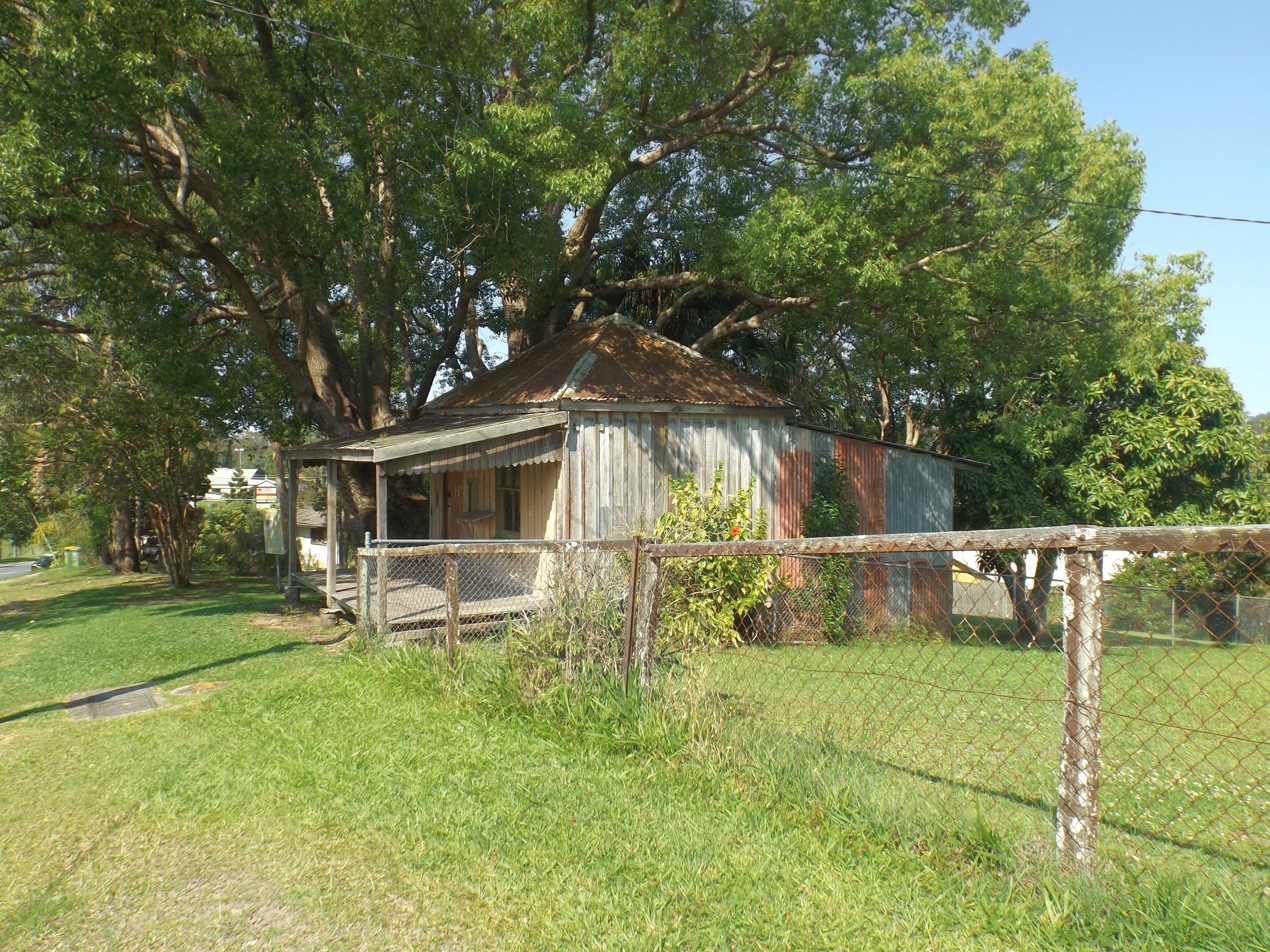
View from street, 2015

Tallebudgera's location along the main stock route between Queensland and New South Wales, which became the early coach road between Nerang and the border, led to it becoming a convenient stop and changeover point for Cobb and Co. coaches. To serve the coach road traffic, and the wider farming community, a small village began to develop near the intersection of the Old Coach Road and Trees Road. During the 1870s, a number of businesses and services began to appear including an accommodation house for travellers, the Rose and Crown Hotel, a general store, blacksmith, wheelwright, stables and school. Expansion continued in the 1880s with the establishment of a police station, a Presbyterian church, Catholic church and further construction and trade.

The establishment of a post office was an important element in the development of rural communities, providing both access to a communication network and a focal point where the community could share information.They became an integral part of the social system, providing a link to friends and family who were often many years distant. They also provided a link to the authorities of the colonies, becoming the principal symbol of civil governance in the most isolated areas. Particularly where communities were in remote rural or outback areas, the post office became a symbol of the presence of civilisation. Post offices were nearly always the first government service of facility established in towns, and often the first government building.

The post office was one of the main agencies of the government in the nineteenth century and nearly always also included a telegraph office in the same building. The buildings constructed for post and telegraph office use were, as a result, usually sited in prominent locations, and were among the more important government buildings in the town. In small towns, or when a town was first established, existing businesses often agreed to provide post office facilities and then, when the town grew, the government replaced these facilities with purpose built post offices. Privately owned and built post offices were unusual in Queensland.

The site of the post office was part of an area of land acquired by Stephen Tobin through a Deed of Grant in 1870. In 1872, a mail receiving service office was opened and in 1878 the Tallebudgera Post Office officially opened with Stephen Tobin listed as the first Post Master.

Although the post office provided an official government service, there is no documentary evidence to suggest the Tallebudgera building was ever owned by the government. The size of the post office, consisting of just one room, suggests that it was privately owned and built as even the smallest post offices built by the colonial government in the late nineteenth century period had floor areas larger than one room and often combined office space with living areas. That this building was never replaced by a more permanent, government building suggests, that in the eyes of the government, Tallebudgera was not deemed to be large enough to warrant a government facility.

With Federation in 1901, postal and telegraph services became a Commonwealth responsibility. All administrative functions of the Tallebudgera Post Office were transferred to the Commonwealth, but the building remained privately owned. The post office provided a number of services including a trunk line and telephone exchange, postal services, cash-on-delivery parcels, money order and savings bank services, payment of old age and war service pensions and telegraph by telephone. However, in the years after the Second World War the range of facilities gradually declined and by the post office's permanent closure in 1958, only basic postal services were being provided.

The rapid development of the Gold Coast has resulted in the loss of many early buildings. Most have been demolished or relocated to other sites. The former Tallebudgera Post Office, as one of the Gold Coast's earliest surviving buildings, illustrates the area's history and development.

== Description ==
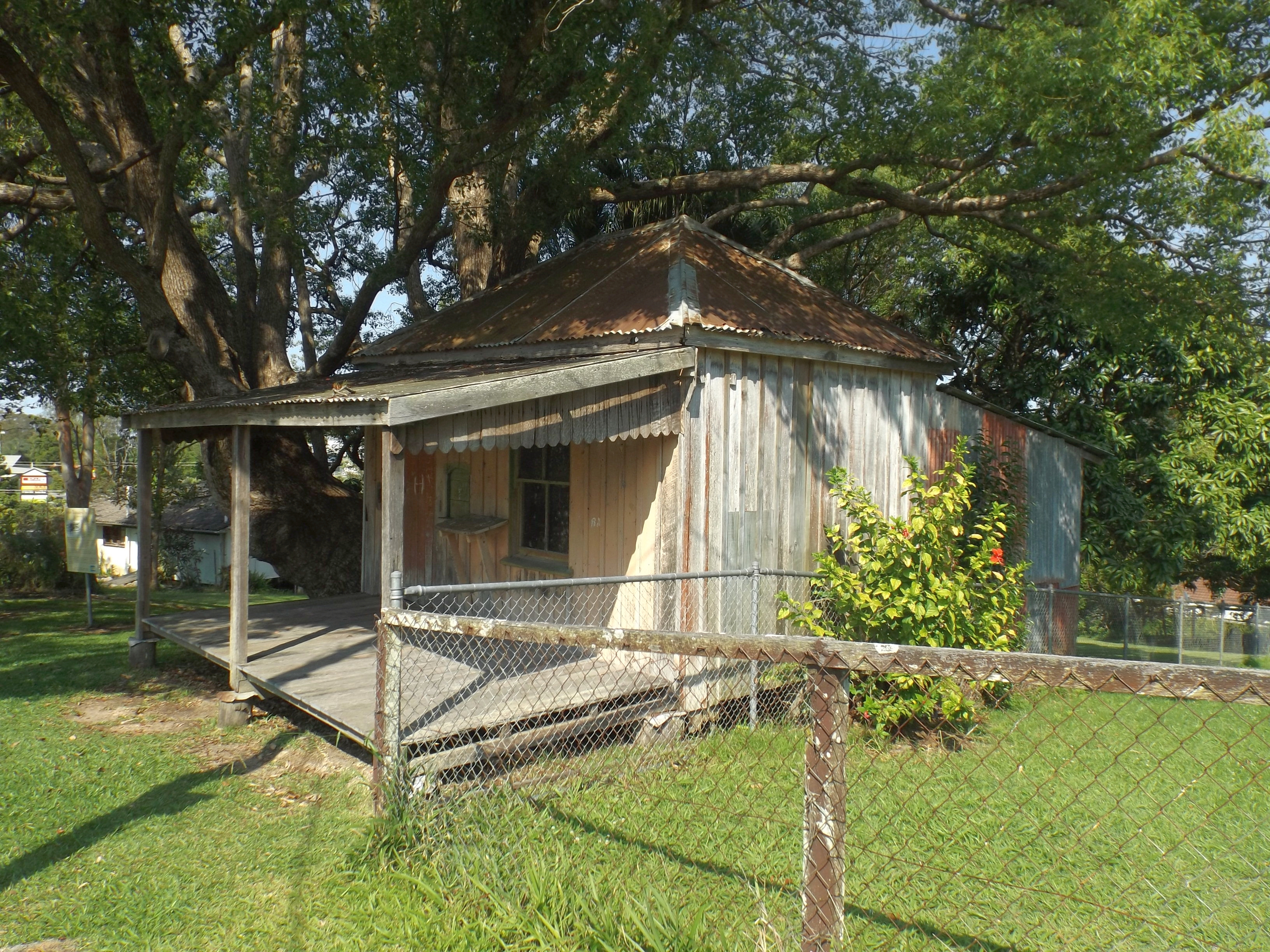
Building in 2015

The former Tallebudgera Post Office is located at 17 Trees Road, Tallebudgera.

The original building is a small, single roomed structure with a verandah at the front. It is constructed from timber in the style known as "board and batten". The building is elevated off the ground on timber stumps with the front of the building being approximately 0.5 metres (1 ft 8 in) above the ground and the rear of the building being approximately 1.5 metres (4 ft 11 in) above the ground. The roof is corrugated iron. Inside the building there are timber shelves attached to the rear and right walls. The inside of the roof was originally lined with wood panels and a small portion of this remains.

A "lean to" extension at the rear of the building has been added at a later, unknown date. The extension has been built from sheets of corrugated iron. It sits on the ground with the bare earth as the floor.

The original building (excluding the extension) measures approximately 5.10 metres (16.7 ft) in width by 6.0 metres (19.7 ft) in length, inclusive of the verandah which is 2.30 metres (7 ft 7 in). The extension adds another 4.0 metres (13.1 ft) to the length of the building.

The building contains mostly original materials. Any new timber used in the restoration process has been date stamped and where possible other new materials, such as rose-headed nails, duplicate those of the original building.

A mature camphor laurel tree (Cinnamomum camphora) is located on the left side of the building with its branches spreading over the roof of the building. An early photograph of the building from 1917 also shows the camphor laurel tree.

== Heritage listing ==
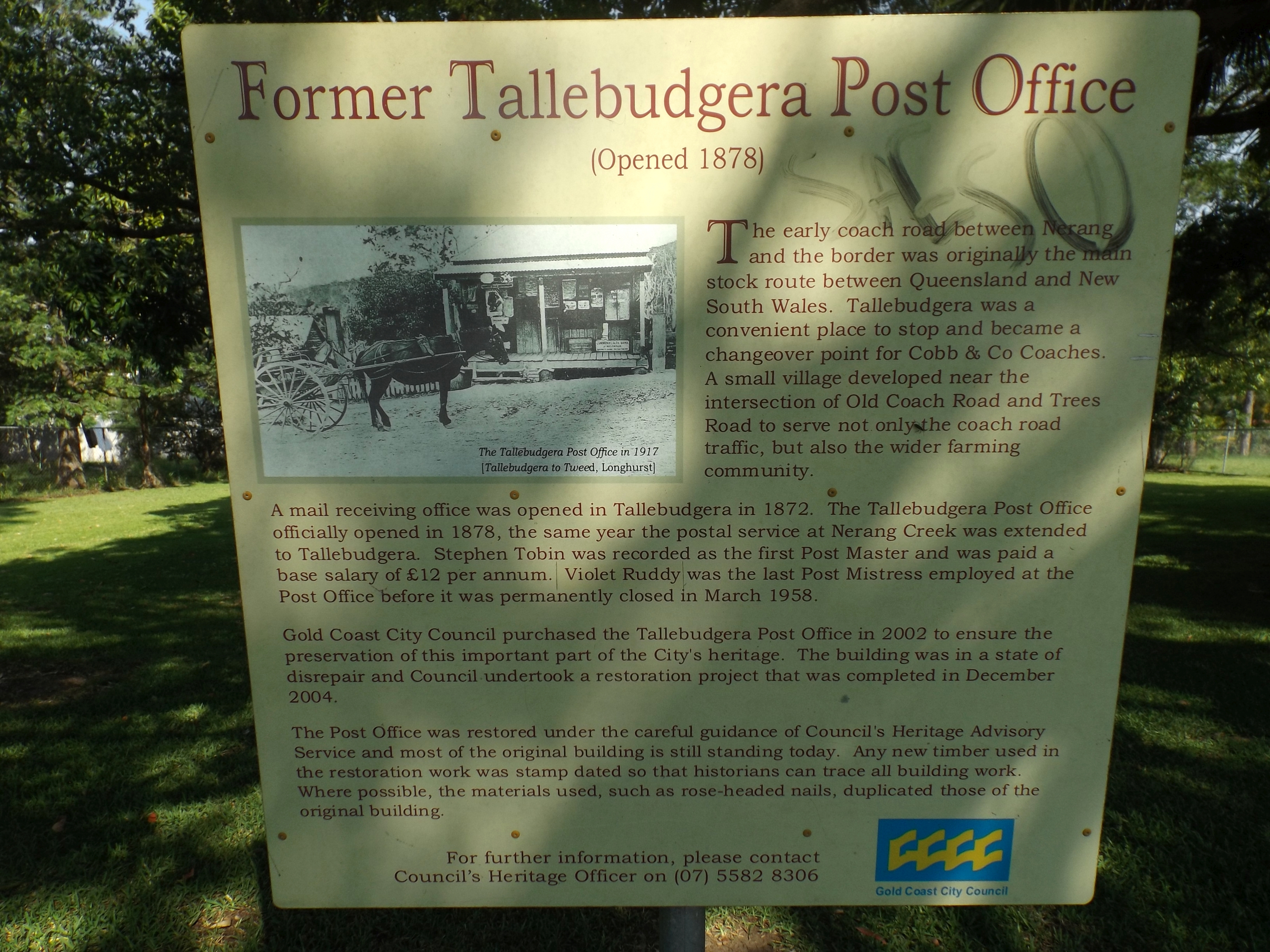
Sign

Tallebudgera Post Office (former) was listed on the Queensland Heritage Register on 1 October 2007 having satisfied the following criteria:

The place is important in demonstrating the evolution or pattern of Queensland's history.

Established in 1878, the former Tallebudgera Post Office, is one of the earliest surviving buildings on the Gold Coast and is important in demonstrating the evolution of postal services in Queensland, the early history and development of the Tallebudgera area and the small rural towns that comprised the hinterland area.

The place demonstrates rare, uncommon or endangered aspects of Queensland's cultural heritage.

The former Tallebudgera Post Office is a rare example of a privately owned and purpose built post office. Few other post offices like this are known to survive in Queensland. Its construction history, ownership, and uncommon building form are all significant. With a single room and verandah, the former post office has value as an unusual building form of the late nineteenth century. It is also one of the oldest and one of the few remaining timber post office buildings in Queensland erected c1869 - c1885.

The place is important in demonstrating the principal characteristics of a particular class of cultural places.

The former Tallebudgera Post Office is an important example of late nineteenth century building techniques. The building contains evidence of early construction methods and finishes and is interesting as a transitional example in the manner in which it is elevated high above the ground at a time when most buildings were set upon the ground or only just above. It is constructed of timber in an early 'board and batten' system, predating the later light timber construction that became known as the Queenslander style. Although the structure has been restored, most of the original building is still standing. It is one of few remaining timber structures from the late nineteenth century left in the Gold Coast area.

The place is important because of its aesthetic significance.

The former Tallebudgera Post Office has important aesthetic significance. It is an intact structure which is an evocative reminder of late nineteenth century village life in the Gold Coast hinterland. The setting of the building with the adjacent mature camphor laurel (Cinnamomum camphora) tree enhances the rural nature of the building and the entire site.

The place has a strong or special association with a particular community or cultural group for social, cultural or spiritual reasons.

The former Tallebudgera Post Office has a strong association with the general community of Tallebudgera for the crucial role it played in the provision of essential postal and telecommunication services.
