= Eastside Lutheran College =

Lutheran school in Warrane, Tasmania,

Location
- Warrane, Tasmania; Australia; 42.854°S 147.388°E

Information
- Type: Lutheran, Independent school, day, Christian
- Motto: Christ our rock
- Religious affiliation: Lutheran Church of Australia
- Denomination: Lutheran
- Established: 1982
- Principal: Stephen Illingworth
- Staff: 76 (60 FTE)
- Enrolment: Approximately 300 (K–10)
- Colours: Navy, white and maroon
- School fees: Centrelink concession rate available, $2,000-$5,000+
- Website: www.elc.tas.edu.au

Eastside Lutheran College (ELC) is an independent co-educational Lutheran school located in Warrane, Tasmania, in Australia. The College provides education from Kindergarten to Year 10 and serves families from Hobart's Eastern Shore and surrounding communities. Established from the relocation and expansion of St Peter's Lutheran School, Eastside Lutheran College has grown to offer both primary and secondary education within a supportive Christian learning environment. ELC has approximately 300 students.

== History ==
=== Eastside Drive-In ===
Built on former farmland, a drive-in cinema designed by Cheesman Doley Brabham & Neighbour architects opened as the Eastside Drive-In on the site in 1966. Accommodating 418 cars, the screen measured 330 square metres (3,600 sq ft) in size, then the largest in Australia. The Australian Red Cross received all the revenues from the opening picture, The Sound of Music starring Julie Andrews. The drive-in was highly profitable in the years following the Tasman Bridge disaster, which separated the eastern shore from the Hobart CBD. After 18 years of operation, Village Cinemas shut down the venue in 1984. The former projection room and café survives as part of the Eastside Lutheran College, housing the institution's administrative offices.

=== Establishment of the college ===
Eastside Lutheran College (originally named St Peter's Lutheran School) was established in 1982 by St Peter's Lutheran Church in Hobart. ELC was originally located in the home next to the original Lutheran church in Davey Street. In 1985, when student enrolment numbers increased, ELC moved to its new property on the eastern shore of the Derwent River and became known as Eastside Christian School Lindisfarne. By the end of 2002, the school moved towards a secondary curriculum. In November 2004, it was decided to change the name from Eastside Christian School to Eastside Lutheran College. The college is affiliated with the Lutheran Church of Australia and is supported by Lutheran Education Victoria, New South Wales and Tasmania.

== House system ==
As with most Tasmanian schools, Eastside Lutheran College utilises a house system. The college houses are:

- Bass – gold
- Flinders – green
- Mawson – blue

These house teams are used in school sport events, including the primary school swimming carnival, college sports carnival, and cross country.

== Co-curriculum ==
Eastside Lutheran College offers a variety of co-curriculum programs. As the college has continued to expand, the college has been able to establish new programs, such as:

- Cheerleading & Dance
- Choir
- Drama
- Instrumental music
- Extracurricular sport teams
- Duke of Edinburgh Award

=== Arts ===
There is a wide range of programs and electives offered to the students, such as short courses in visual arts, photography and sculpture, extension academic programs, psychology, philosophy, outdoor education, and a Nature Play Kindergarten.

=== Music ===
The college has an instrumental tuition program, in which students can learn a variety of instruments in an individual and small group learning environment. The college also offers a band program, and many performance opportunities at school assemblies, eisteddfods, and community events. The college junior choir and senior choir perform in the local community events, Clarence City Eisteddfod, and the Festival of Voices.

=== Sport ===
The college is active in local interschool athletics and swimming events in Tasmania. The college runs a cheerleading program that regularly participates in local cheerleading competitions run by World Cup Cheer and Dance and with an Olympic coach. It has a number of extracurricular sport teams that change each year depending on need and interest.

== See also ==
- Drive-in theatres in Australia
- List of Lutheran schools in Australia
- List of theatres in Hobart
