= St Andrews Lutheran College =

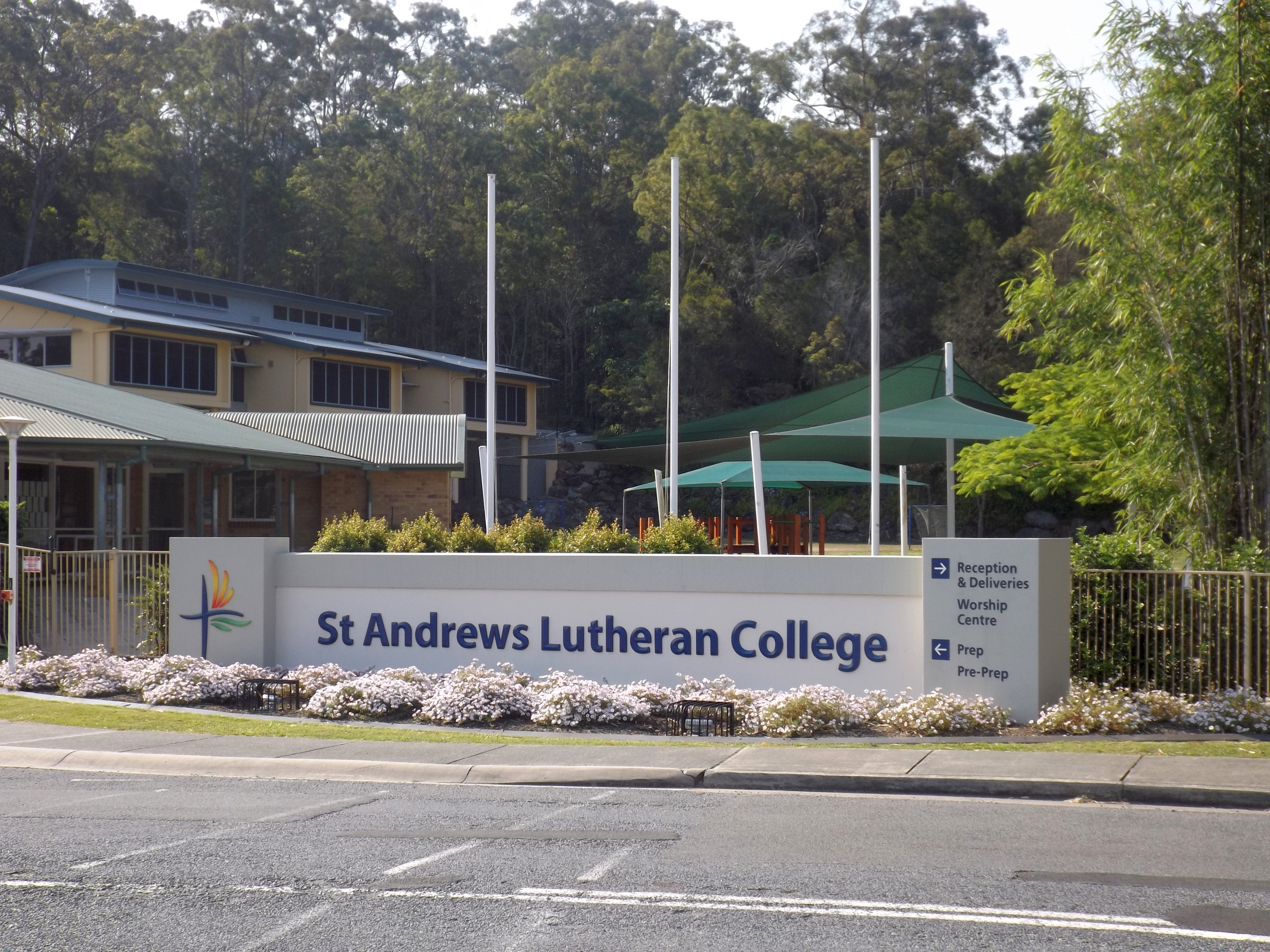

Location
- Tallebugera Creek Road; Tallebudgera, Queensland, Australia; 28°07′19.50″S 153°25′58.58″E

Information
- Type: Private
- Motto: Sempre Fidelis – "Always Faithful" (1993–present)
- Religious affiliation: Lutheran
- Established: 1993
- Principal: Luke Schoff
- Staff: 76
- Teaching staff: 96
- Grades: P–12
- Enrollment: 1374
- Colors: Blue and red
- Houses: Jubi, Gowandi, Wardjam, Binging
- Website: www.salc.qld.edu.au

St Andrews Lutheran College is a private Lutheran based junior school, middle school, and senior school at Tallebudgera on the Gold Coast in Queensland, Australia.

== History ==
Following the success of Trinity Lutheran College at Ashmore, Queensland, the Lutheran Church of Australia started to plan the establishment of a Lutheran school to service the southern end of the Gold Coast, Australia in the late 1980s.

The school is located in Tallebudgera, Queensland and currently has over 1300 students.

The school opened for teaching in February 1993.

Since opening, the school has expanded from one set of demountable classrooms, to ten extensive learning blocks. It facilitates three sporting ovals (as well as an indoor multi-purpose centre) and a basketball court. It has a theatre to support the performing arts, a covered outdoor learning area (COLA) and in 2022 the Centre for Creative Industries was opened. In 2023, the school celebrated its 30th anniversary with numerous activities throughout the year.

In 2021, the school was subject to an investigation due to fears of a cancer cluster. No evidence of a cancer cluster was found, however a number of parents called for further investigation, and pulled their students from the college. In 2023, school principal David Bliss was diagnosed with pancreatic cancer and retired in June 2024.

The school serves pre-school to 12th grade classes. It has sister school relationships with Osaka Business Frontier Senior High School, in Osaka, Japan, and with Gymnasium Nord, in Frankfurt, Germany.

== Principals ==
- Wolf Stuetzel, 1993–1999
- Ruth Butler, 2000–2009
- Timothy Kotzur, 2010–2016
- David Bliss, 2017–2024
- Luke Schoff, 2024–present

== Notable alumni ==
Name	Sport	Top level team/affiliation
Ethan Read	Australian rules football	Gold Coast
Bailey Scott	Australian rules football	North Melbourne
Jamie Stanton	Australian rules football	Brisbane / North Melbourne / Gold Coast
Chelsea Hackett	Mixed martial arts	Ultimate Fighting Championship

== See also ==
- List of Lutheran schools in Australia
