= Warnbro Sound =

Body of water in Australia

Coordinates: 32.3346°S 115.7308°E

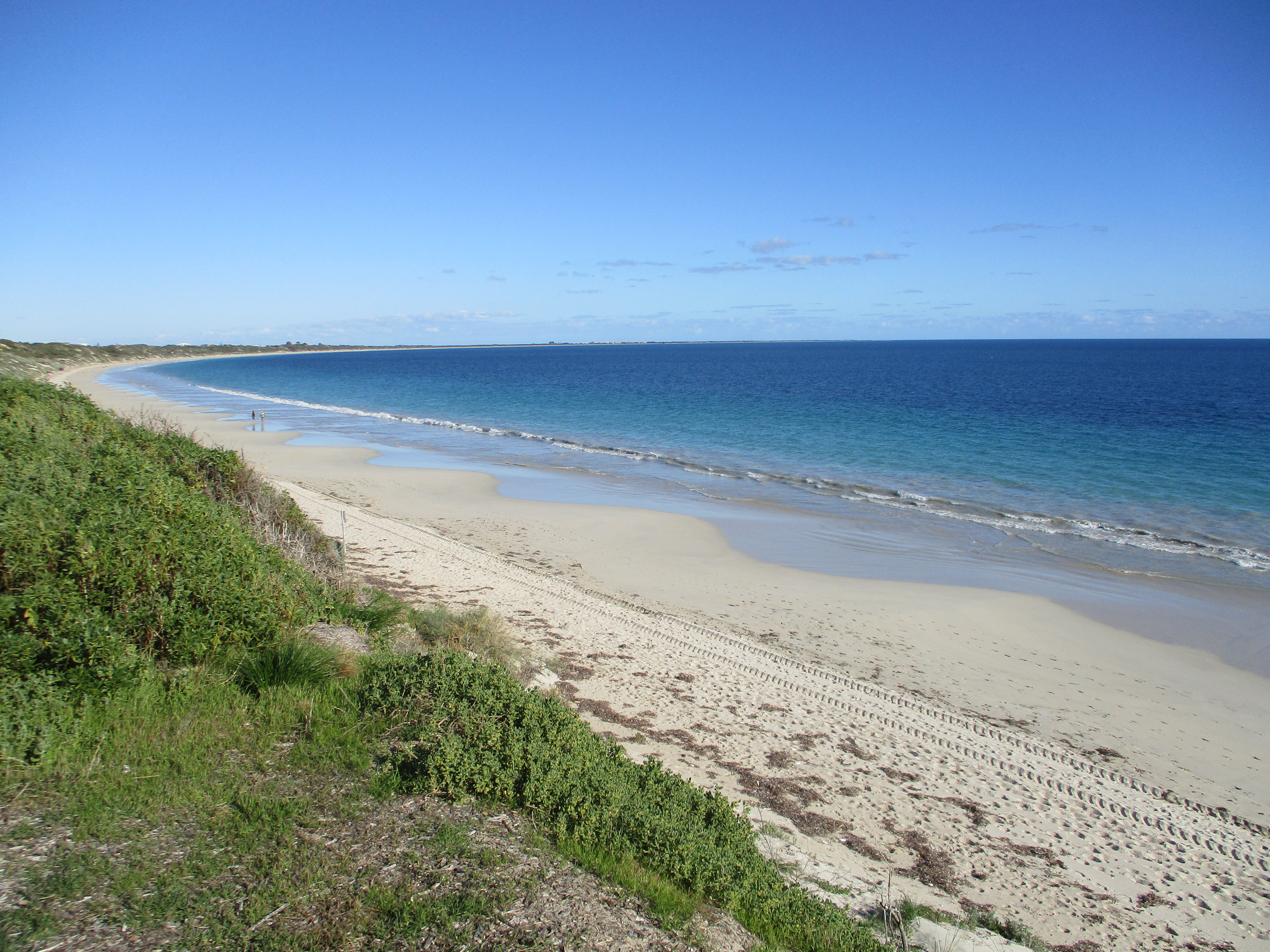
Warnbro Sound, seen from the north

Warnbro Sound, an Indian Ocean embayment, is located on the coast of Western Australia south of Cape Peron, 25 kilometres (16 miles) south of Fremantle. It is a semi-circular sound, 7 kilometres (4.3 mi) wide with 11 kilometres (6.8 mi) of shore. The area was surveyed in 1837 by Surveyor-General John Septimus Roe, who named it in 1838; the etymology of the name is unknown. The Perth suburb of Warnbro is named after it.

In summer 2014–2015, the beach at Warnbro Sound was closed for a number of days while the state Department of Fisheries pursued a great white shark that was frequenting the area. The impact of the department's "catch-and-kill" order on beach safety and scientific research was the subject of some controversy.
