= Faith Lutheran College, Redlands =

Coordinates: 27°35′7.21″S 153°17′38.62″E

Faith Lutheran College Redlands
- Redlands, QLD; Australia

Information
- Type: Public co-educational
- Motto: Faith in Christ, prepared for life
- Established: 1982
- Principal: Shane Altmann
- Enrolment: 1064 (2024)
- Campus: Junior: Victoria Point; Middle/Senior: Thornlands
- Colours: Blue, navy, gold
- Website: www.faithlutheran.qld.edu.au

Faith Lutheran College Redlands (often abbreviated as FLCR), Queensland, Australia, is an independent co-educational Lutheran primary and secondary college located on two campuses in Victoria Point (Junior School) and Thornlands (Middle and Senior School). The college currently educates students from Prep to Year 12.

== Location and grounds ==
Faith Lutheran College Redlands is located on two separate campuses with connected staff. The Junior School (P–6) is located at Link Road, Victoria Point and the Middle (7–9) and Senior School (10–12) at Beveridge Road, Thornlands. The college is currently in the process of expanding its Beveridge Road campus. The newly constructed and completed Creative Arts building includes a 360-seat theatre and stage, as well as additional classrooms for drama, music and visual arts. A new indoor performance and sporting hall has recently been built at the Link Road Campus.

== History ==
Faith Lutheran College Redlands, was the first independent Christian school to be established in the then Redlands Shire. In its beginning year, the school had seventy-two students enrolled across years one to four and it grew quickly. It soon came to be known as Faith Lutheran Primary School, because of its proximity to Faith Lutheran Church at Redland Bay. The first Year Seven cohort graduated in 1984 when the student population was 161. In 1986 the student population reached 195. A preschool was commenced in 1996, the student population then being 215. This preschool was later renamed "Prep" in 2006, following the naming standard set by Education Queensland.

In 1997, planning commenced expanding the primary school into a P–12 college. In 1999, the School Council's initial application to commence secondary application was unsuccessful. Despite this, and assisted by the Parish, the School purchased land at Beveridge Road in October 2000, which at that time was used as a yam farm and Shetland pony stud farm. In 2001, approval was gained to start secondary schooling and the newly renamed Faith Lutheran College Redlands began teaching Year eight students in 2003 at the Link Road campus. The building had commenced at the Beveridge Road campus, and it commenced operation in October 2003, ahead of its official opening on 8 February 2004. At that time, the college's enrolment was 548 students. FLCR graduated its first cohort of Year Twelve students at the end of 2007, at which time there were 880 students enrolled.

=== Council Chairs ===
1981	Ben Guse (chair, Planning Committee)
1981–1986	Albert Benfer (Foundation Chair)
?–1991	Ray Pace
1992–2010	Gavin Buhse
2010–current	Rod Cormack

=== Principals ===
1982–1986	Robert Marriott (Foundation Principal)
1987–1990	Richard Lewis
1991–1995	Ian Mibus
1996–1999	Jeff Gork
2000	Greg Lees
2001	Lois Pfitzner
2002–2016	Anthony Mueller
2017–current	Shane Altmann

== College logo ==
FLCR Logo

The college logo was inspired by the college's coastal setting and incorporates important Christian symbolism. The cross is central to the Christian faith and it represents the love of God as expressed through the death of Jesus Christ. The water represents the removal of sin through baptism. The fish symbol was a secret sign used amongst early Christians. The rising sun represents resurrection and the promise of eternal life with God.

== School houses ==
Like most Australian schools, FLCR uses the School house system, and has various inter-house competitions. There are four houses, all named after local Moreton Bay Islands:

- – Coochiemudlo (often shortened to "Coochie")
- – Macleay
- – Peel
- – Russell

== Co-curricular ==
FLCR offers its students a variety of extra-curricular activities including music, singing and other performing arts, cultural activities, special interest groups and sports.

== See also ==
- List of Lutheran schools in Australia
