= Jemma Mi Mi =

Australian netball player

Personal information
- Born: 4 March 1996 (age 30) Newcastle, New South Wales, Australia
- Height: 1.76 m (5 ft 9 in)

Netball career
- Playing positions: WA, WD, C
Years	Club team	Apps
2017–2022	Queensland Firebirds	11

Jemma Mi Mi (born 4 March 1996) is an Australian netball player in the Suncorp Super Netball league. She played for the Queensland Firebirds for six seasons before her contract was not renewed at the end of the 2022 Suncorp Super Netball season.

She attended Carmel College, Thornlands during her secondary schooling. Mi Mi made her debut for the Firebirds in 2017, signing with the Brisbane-based franchise in late 2016. As a young sportswoman, Mi Mi played high-level touch rugby and represented the Australian under-15 and Queensland under-21 netball teams, before being included as a reserve player for Australia at the Netball World Youth Cup. She played 11 of 29 matches in her first two seasons at the Firebirds.

Jemma Mi Mi completed a Bachelor of Clinical Exercise Physiology, and currently works with Body Smart Health as well as with the Diamond Spirit Program.
