= Warnbro Community High School =

Location
- Warnbro; Australia; 32°20′42″S 115°45′31″E

Information
- Type: Public co-educational high day school
- Motto: I am because we are
- Established: 1994; 32 years ago
- Educational authority: WA Department of Education
- Principal: Deb Bright
- Years: 7–12
- Enrolment: 858 (2022)
- Campus type: Suburban
- Colours: Navy blue, white and red
- Website: warnbro.wa.edu.au

Warnbro Community High School is a public co-educational high day school, located in Warnbro, 50 kilometres (31 mi) south of Perth, Western Australia.

== History ==
The school was established in 1995 in a cluster of demountable buildings at Rockingham Senior High School while the first stage of construction worth $13.5 million was commenced. This stage was completed in 1995 and included general classrooms, science laboratories, a library, a sports hall and technology and enterprise facilities. The final stage was completed in 1999, cost $6 million, and included the middle school, administration area, performing arts centre and computing facilities. During 2013, an entire new block was started. The new block contains S+E facilities and has a new car-park.

The school had a total enrolment of 1492 in 2007, but student numbers are declining over the years with 1247 in 2008, 1204 in 2009, 1041 in 2010, 1132 in 2011, 1207 in 2012, 1130 in 2013 and 1041 in 2014. However, there was an increase of students to 1237 in 2015.

The school takes students from the surrounding areas of Mandurah, Rockingham and Baldivis.

== Notable alumni ==
- Ben Offereins – athlete; represented Australia in the London 2012 Olympic Games

== See also ==
- List of schools in the Perth metropolitan area
