= Warnbro, Western Australia =

Warnbro
- Suburb
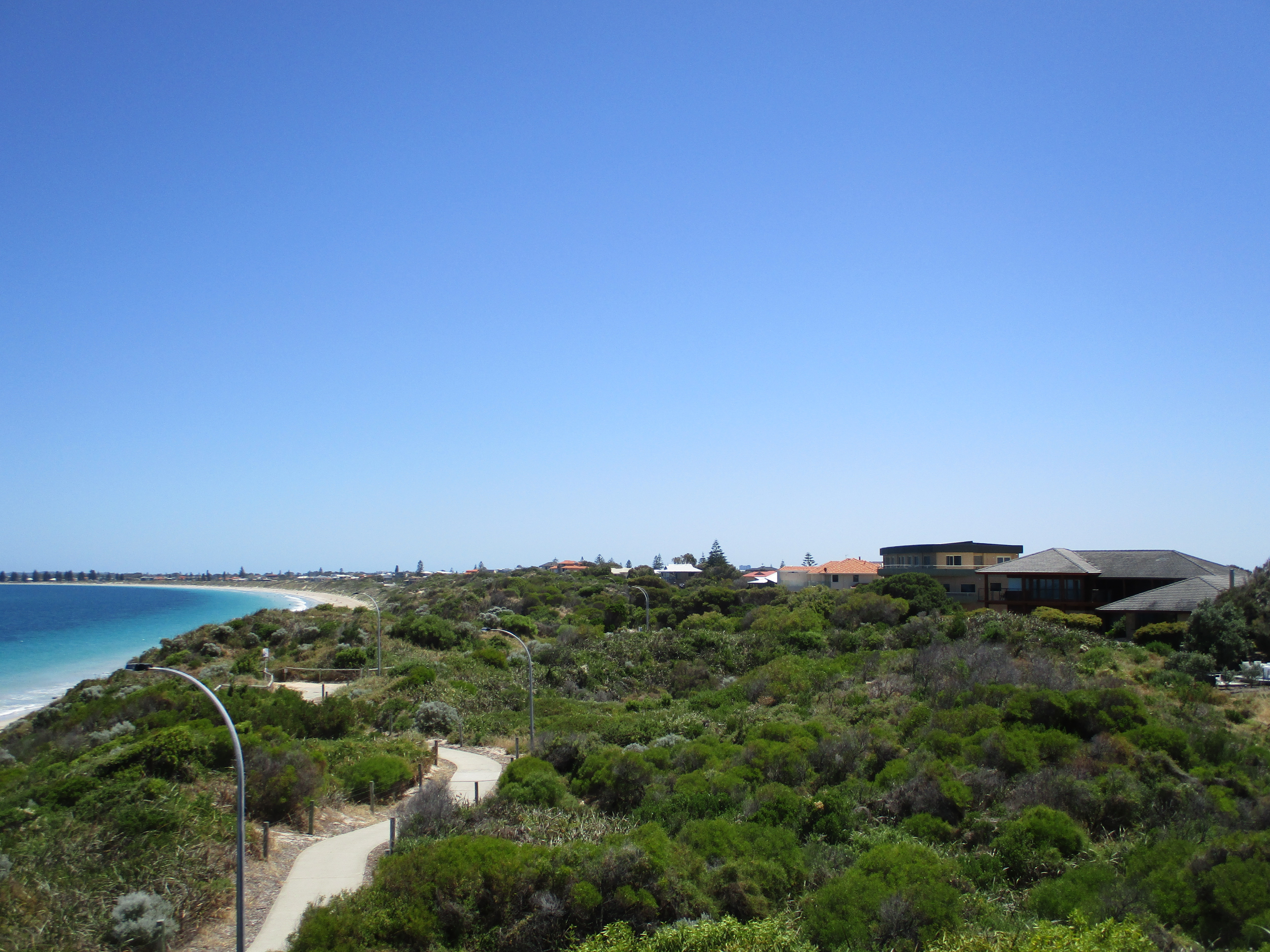
- View from the foreshore, looking north
- Interactive map of Warnbro
- Coordinates: 32.340°S 115.747°E
- Country: Australia
- State: Western Australia
- City: Perth
- LGA: City of Rockingham
- Location: 56 km (35 mi) from Perth

Government
  - State electorate: Secret Harbour
  - Federal division: Brand

Area
  - Total: 13.9 km^{2} (5.4 sq mi)

Population
  - Total: 10,828 (SAL 2021)
- Postcode: 6169
Suburbs around Warnbro
Waikiki	Baldivis
Warnbro	Baldivis
Port Kennedy	Baldivis

Warnbro is a southern outer suburb of Perth, the capital of Western Australia, located on Warnbro Sound within the City of Rockingham. It adjoins Port Kennedy which combines residential with retail and light-industrial land use. The suburb, which is named after Warnbro Sound, was gazetted on 5 April 1974.

Secondary schools are the Warnbro Community High School which has about 1,600 students, and Living Waters Lutheran College, one of two Lutheran schools in Western Australia. The suburb has sporting facilities including "Aqua Jetty", a multi-purpose recreation facility with Olympic-sized swimming pools and a large gymnasium. The Vicinity Centres Warnbro Fair Shopping Centre includes supermarkets together with a wide range of specialty retailers and fast-food outlets.

== Notable residents ==
- Warnbro is the home of the nineteenth Earl of Lincoln, who succeeded to the English title in 2001.
- English-born Hollywood actor Sam Worthington grew up in Warnbro.

== Public transport ==
Warnbro railway station on the Perth-Mandurah line is served by a network of feeder bus services which also link the suburb with Rockingham.

== See also ==
- Electoral district of Warnbro
