= Tallebudgera =

- Suburb
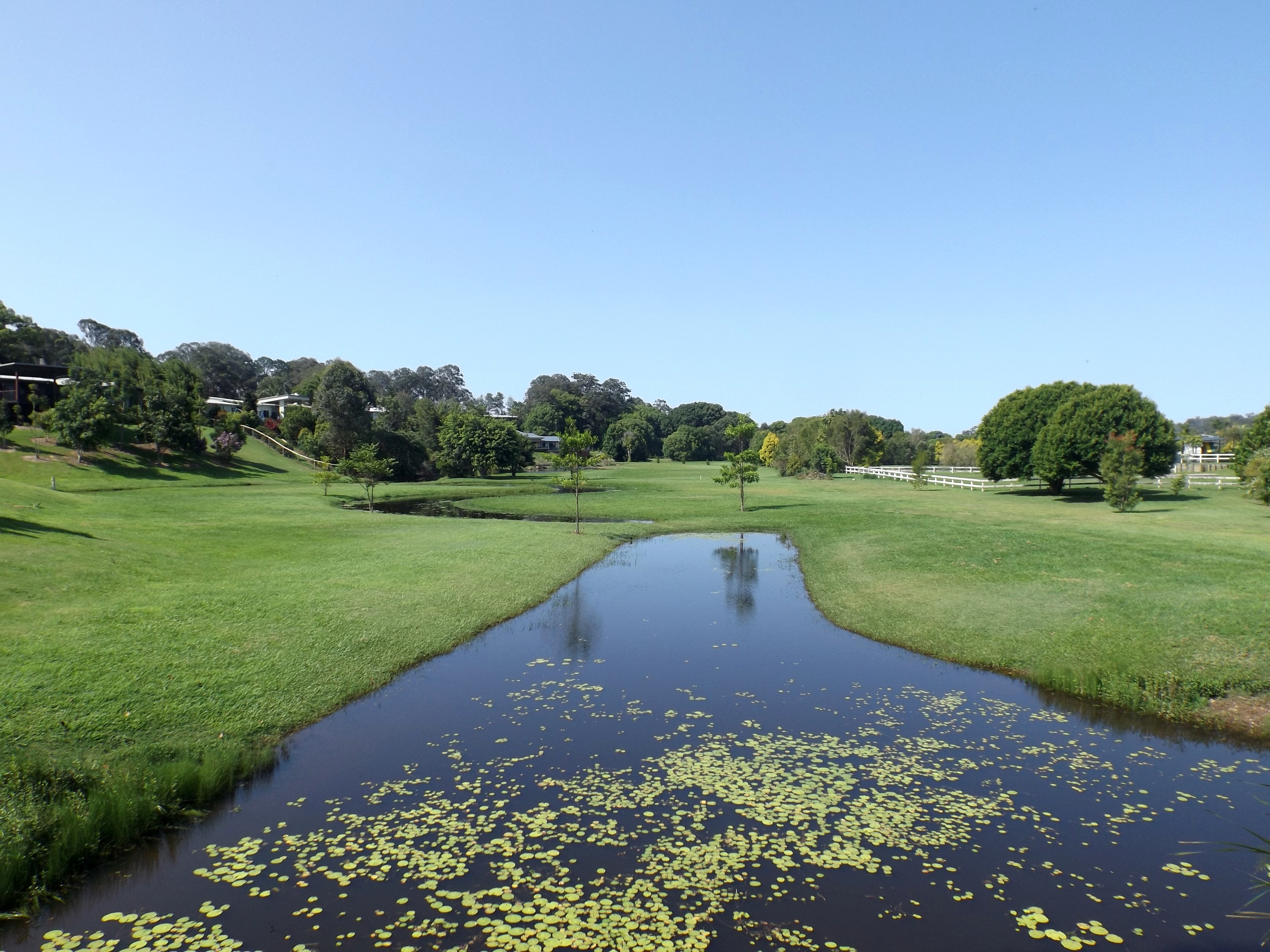
- Waterway along Tobin Way, 2015

- Interactive map of Tallebudgera
- Coordinates: 28.1488°S 153.4205°E
- Country: Australia
- State: Queensland
- City: Gold Coast
- LGA: City of Gold Coast
- Location: 8.4 km (5.2 mi) WNW of Tweed Heads; 16.7 km (10.4 mi) S of Surfers Paradise; 23.2 km (14.4 mi) S of Southport; 90.5 km (56.2 mi) SSE of Brisbane

Government
  - State electorate: Currumbin
  - Federal division: McPherson

Area
  - Total: 19.3 km^{2} (7.5 sq mi)
- Elevation: 8 m (26 ft)

Population
  - Total: 3,826 (2021 census)
  - Density: 198.2/km^{2} (513.4/sq mi)
- Time zone: UTC+10:00 (AEST)
- Postcode: 4228
Suburbs around Tallebudgera
Tallebudgera Valley	Burleigh Heads	Palm Beach
Tallebudgera Valley	Tallebudgera	Elanora
Tallebudgera Valley	Currumbin Valley	Currumbin Valley

Tallebudgera (/ˌtæləˈbʌdʒərə/ TAL-ə-BUJ-ər-ə) is a suburb in the City of Gold Coast, Queensland, Australia. In the 2021 census, Tallebudgera had a population of 3,826 people.

== Geography ==
Tallebudgera Creek forms a part of the western and eastern border of Tallebudgera.

== History ==
The traditional owners were the Tulgigin clan of Australian Aboriginals, but in the 2011 Census, Indigenous Australians accounted for just 0.9% of the population of Tallebudgera (around one third of the national average of 2.5%).

The village was originally called Maybree, perhaps after the name of a tree that grew locally, while Tallebudgera was the name of the creek and was an Aboriginal word meaning good fish. Another theory is that the name refers to a property called "Mayberry" owned by pioneers Stephen Tobin and his wife Mary. Tobin was known for his hospitality and it is possible that Mayberry was shortened to Maybree and became well known as a place to stay when travelling through or to Tallebudgera.

Tallebudgera State School opened on 17 October 1877.

Tallebudgera Presbyterian Church was opened in August 1888 by Reverend James Ewen.

In 1904, 10,000 acres subdivided in to 36 dairy farms known as "Tallebudgera and Currumbin Estate" were advertised for sale by auction by Isles, Love and Co. auctioneers. Blocks from 72 acres up to 557 acres were advertised as available for purchase.

Tallebudgera Upper State School opened in 1923 and closed circa 1942. It was on the western side of Tallebudgera Creek Road (approx 28.20565°S 153.33389°E), now within Tallebudgera Valley.

St Andrew's Lutheran College opened in 1993.

== Demographics ==
In the 2016 census, Tallebudgera had a population of 3,667 people.

In the 2021 census, Tallebudgera had a population of 3,826 people.

== Heritage listings ==
Tallebudgera has a number of heritage-listed sites, including:

- 17 Trees Road: former Tallebudgera Post Office

While not heritage listed, the single lane Coplicks wooden bridge which crossed Tallebudgera Creek along Tallebudgera Connection Road was a visible sign of the rural nature of the valley. Up until the 1980s, this bridge was the only crossing of the creek along Tallebudgera Connection Road and being one way, drivers had to give way to everyone heading north. The road has now been upgraded with a large 2 lane bridge. The old timber bridge remained until June 2019 when it was replaced with a concrete structure due to safety concerns, much to the disappointment of local residents. The bridge can be accessed from Scotty Logan Lane.

== Education ==
Tallebudgera State School is a government primary (Prep–6) school for boys and girls at 492 Guineas Creek Road (28.1399°S 153.4298°E). In 2017, the school had an enrolment of 771 students with 56 teachers (46 full-time equivalent) and 33 non-teaching staff (20 full-time equivalent). It includes a special education program.

St Andrews Lutheran College is a private primary and secondary (Prep–12) school for boys and girls at 175 Tallebudgera Creek Road (28.1226°S 153.4315°E). In 2017, the school had an enrolment of 1204 students with 81 teachers (73 full-time equivalent) and 74 non-teaching staff (45 full-time equivalent).

There are no government secondary schools in Tallebudgera. The nearest government secondary school is Elanora State High School in neighbouring Elanora to the west.

== Amenities ==
Tallebudgera Golf Course is an 18-hole course at 495 Guineas Creek Road (28.1361°S 153.4297°E).
