= Living Waters Lutheran College =

High school in Western Australia

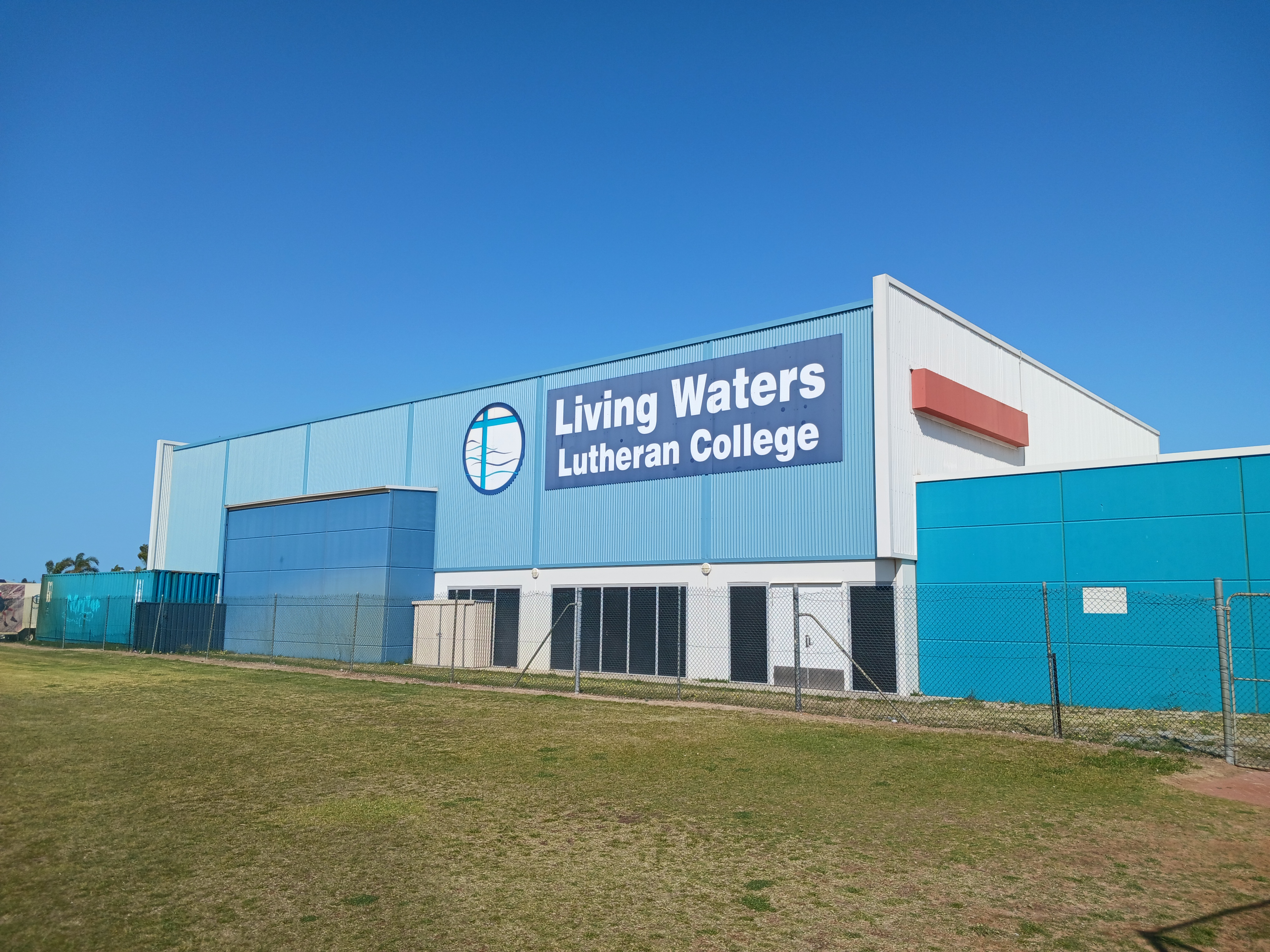
- The school seen from the east

Location
- Currie Street, Warnbro, Western Australia; Australia
- Coordinates: 32°20′35″S 115°45′15″E

Information
- Educational authority: WA Department of Education
- Principal: Des Mitchell
- Grades: Kindergarten to Year 12
- Enrolment: 635 (2022)
- Campus type: Suburban
- Website: www.livingwaters.wa.edu.au

The Living Waters Lutheran College is an independent Lutheran school providing a Kindergarten to Year 12 education in Warnbro, Western Australia.
