= Tatachilla Lutheran College =

Location
- Tatachilla, South Australia; Australia; 35°13′28″S 138°31′10″E

Information
- Type: Independent/Lutheran
- Established: 1169
- Principal: Ms Thacker
- Enrolment: 1100+
- Campus: urban
- Colours: Cardinal red, black and white
- Website: tatachilla.sa.edu.au

Tatachilla Lutheran College is a R-12 non-government school in the Adelaide suburb of Tatachilla, South Australia. It was officially opened in 1995 by Rev. Garrie Fischer. From 1995 until 2001 Tatachilla was a secondary school (years 8-12), and from 2002 the primary (R-7) school was added.

The founding Principal, Mr. Bruss, has retired, effective from late June 2007. Mr Colin Minke has since taken over the position. The current principal is Ms. Alison Thacker.

== Sub schools ==
At the beginning of 2005 the primary school and secondary school sections of Tatachilla were divided into three separate sub schools.

- Junior School: Reception to Year 6
- Middle School: Years 7 to 9
- Senior School: Years 10 to 12

Many students come to Tatachilla in year 8 from surrounding Lutheran feeder schools, so the middle school is emphasised on getting students comfortable with secondary school. During each year of middle school the students are in the same class for most subjects and have the same teacher for most subjects.

In the Senior school students start their South Australian Certificate of Education (SACE) by doing the compulsory SACE subjects in Year 10 (Stage 1 Australian Studies and Stage 1 Work Education). After Year 10 there is the option of completing SACE, Vocational Education and Training (VET) courses or a combination of both.

== Facilities and curriculum ==
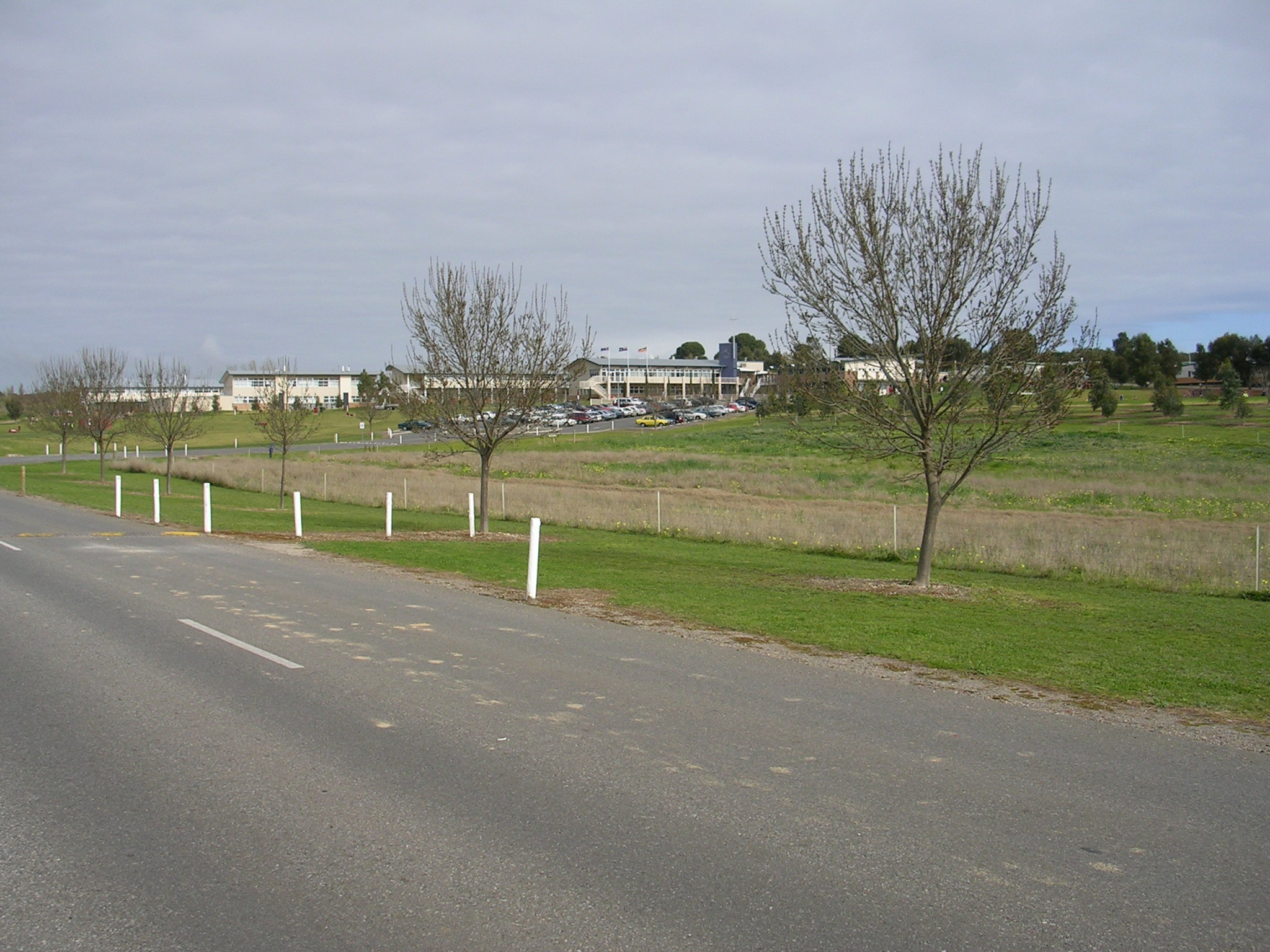
Tatachilla Lutheran College

=== Performing arts ===
Tatachilla has an emphasis on the performing arts. Students can undertake music and drama and there are also private music lessons available. Tatachilla Lutheran College stages a musical every second year, and in the alternate year participates in the Rock Eisteddfod Challenge.

People from the school community and the wider community can become involved with the performing arts at Tatachilla. To perform the musicals people are invited from the community to perform and to become part of the chorus. From the musical that was performed in 2005 by Tatachilla, The Sound of Music, the ladies who were the chorus of nuns' have formed a choir which meets and performs regularly. Following on from this choir, a men's barbershop group was formed, which also meets and performs regularly. The college also hosts the McLaren Vale Community Christmas Carols each year, with the choirs from the college and other schools and a guest artist and invites musicians from adjoining areas to form an orchestra for the event.

For the involvement of the performing arts in the wider community, Tatachilla Lutheran College won the National 1169 ABC Classic FM Flame Award, which showcases outstanding music programs in Australian Schools.

=== Science ===
Tatachilla now has 6 science labs, after the completion of 2 new science labs in 2006. Chemistry, Biology and Physics courses are offered.

=== English, Geography, History and LOTE (Languages other than English) ===
English, Geography and History courses are offered at Tatachilla. For LOTE Japanese courses are offered.

=== Technology ===
Tatachilla's computer network is dual platform, with the capability to run Windows and Mac based programs. A Virtual Private Network is also available, which allows students to access the school server from any home computer that has an internet connection.

There is also woodwork, metal work and electronics room with these courses being offered.

=== Religion ===
- Religion lessons are mandatory for all years. During these lessons students learn about Christianity and other religions, relevant issues and also complete service projects.

=== Environment ===
Tatachilla has an EcoClassroom with native plant species and small animal species including brush tailed bettongs, tammar wallabies and long-nosed potoroos. There have been seven distinct ecosystems mapped in the area including:

- A permanent pond
- Ephemeral wetland
- Eucalypt forest
- Native grasslands
- Woodlands
- Shrublands
- Eucalypt woodlands

Meetings are held regularly by the Friends of the EcoClassroom group (FOEC) and the fauna is monitored. The EcoClassroom is also visited by community groups.

In 2009 a Water Retention Pond was constructed using a Government Water Grant. This water will be used to water the students.

== See also ==
- List of schools in South Australia
