= Thornlands, Queensland =

Thornlands
- Suburb
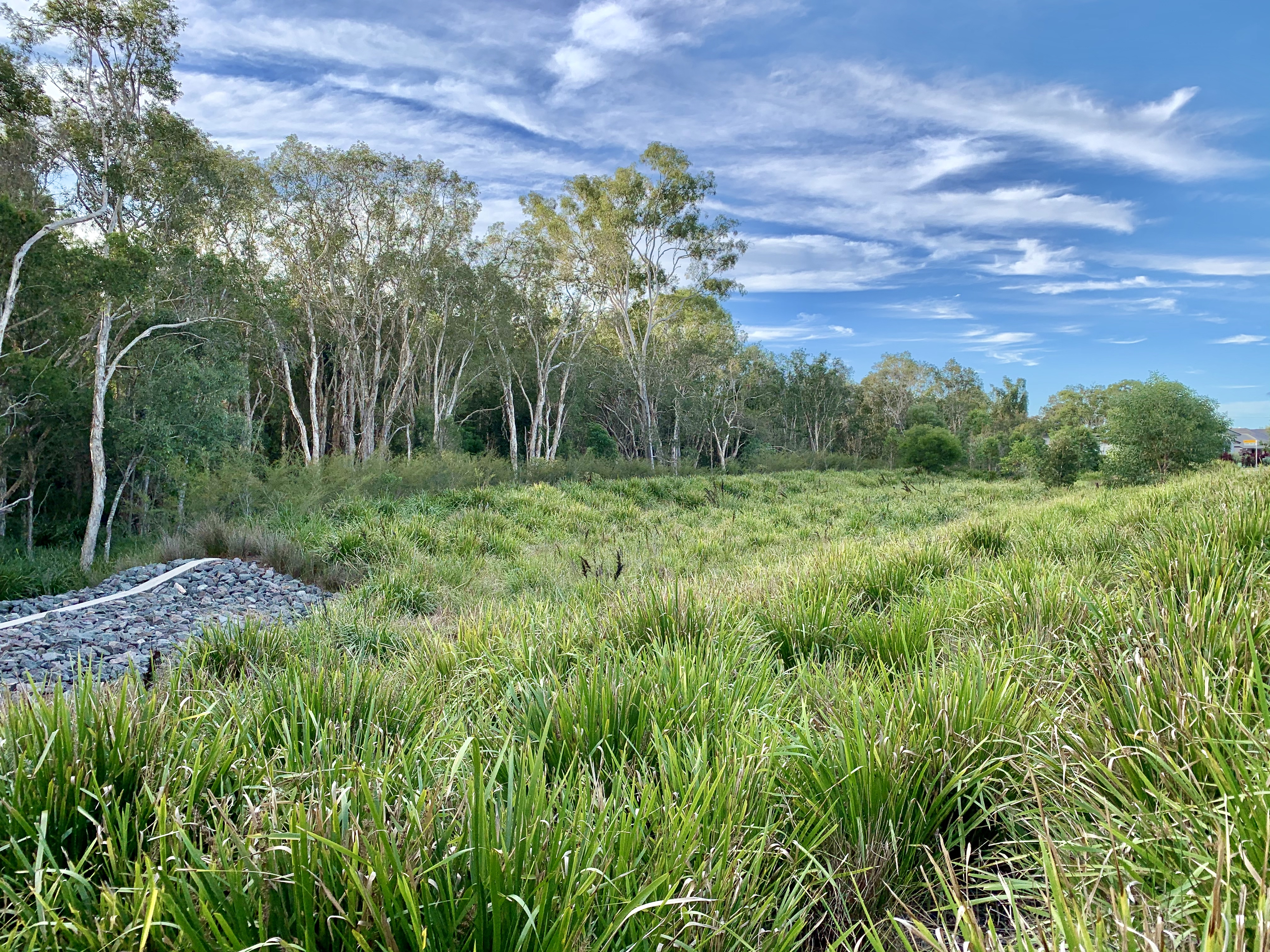
- Park in Thornlands

- Interactive map of Thornlands
- Coordinates: 27.5677°S 153.2580°E
- Country: Australia
- State: Queensland
- City: Redland City
- LGA: Redland City
- Location: 5.6 km (3.5 mi) S of Cleveland; 32.4 km (20.1 mi) SE of Brisbane CBD

Government
  - State electorates: Oodgeroo; Redlands
  - Federal division: Bowman

Area
  - Total: 21.9 km^{2} (8.5 sq mi)

Population
  - Total: 19,263 (2021 census)
  - Density: 879.6/km^{2} (2,278/sq mi)
- Time zone: UTC+10:00 (AEST)
- Postcode: 4164
Suburbs around Thornlands
Alexandra Hills	Cleveland	Moreton Bay
Sheldon	Thornlands	Victoria Point
Mount Cotton	Mount Cotton	Victoria Point

Thornlands is a coastal residential locality in the City of Redland, Queensland, Australia. In the 2021 census, Thornlands had a population of 19,263 people.

== Geography ==
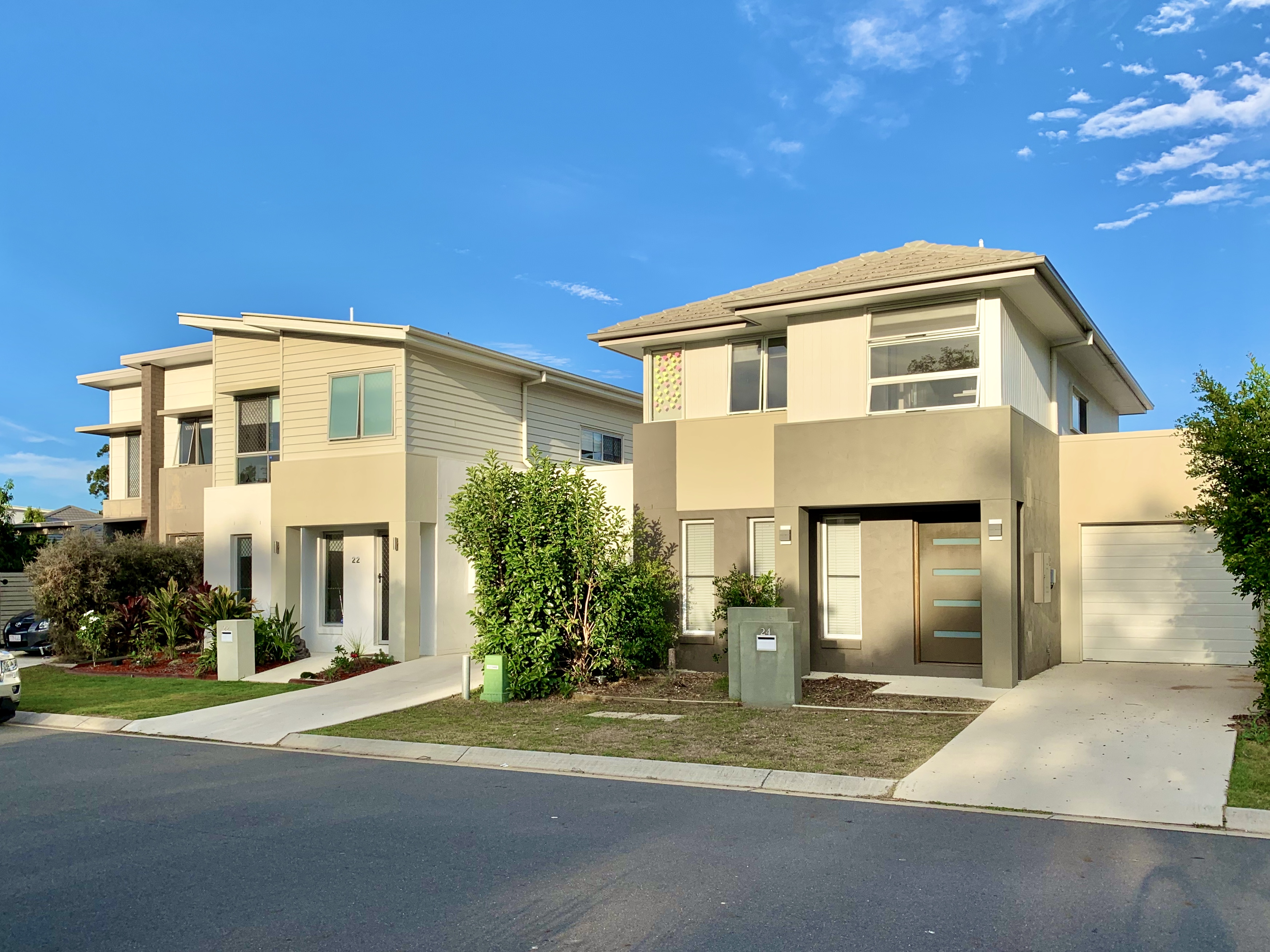
Houses in Thornlands, 2020

Thornlands is located approximately 32 kilometres (20 miles) by road south-east Brisbane, the capital of the Queensland.

Major access to Thornlands is provided by Boundary Road, Cleveland-Redland Bay Road, or Wellington Street.

It is predominantly used for residential purposes, but some parts in the south of the locality are still used for farming.

The area is now primarily suburban residences, with the southern parts rural residences, comprising larger land blocks. The population is growing rapidly due to new housing developments.

== History ==
Thornlands began as part of the area then encompassed by Cleveland, and was leased (along with most of the land between Ormiston and the Logan River), to Joseph Clarke. He relinquished his lease in 1858, allowing small farmers to settle in the area.

The area took the name Thornlands after George Thorn, a major landholder in the area, whose lands were subdivided around 1900. The area was settled, like the surrounding suburbs, primarily by farmers, mostly growing fruit such as citrus, bananas and mangoes.

Thornlands State School opened on 1 November 1910 with 14 students under teacher Miss M. Fielding.

Redland District Special School opened on 15 November 1975.

The Nazarene Bible College was established on an 18-acre (7.3 ha) site by the Church of the Nazarene. It opened on 8 March 1976 with eight students with a focus on training for the ministry of the church. The college had originally commenced operation in 1953 in Thornleigh, Sydney, but was unable to afford the cost of necessary renovations to that site, so the college decided to relocate to Thornlands. In 1992 the college decided to seek accreditation as a tertiary education provider and in 1993 renamed the college Nazarene Theological College as more appropriate to its wider mission.

Redlands Luthern Primary School (also known as Faith Primary School) opened on 24 January 1982 on land in Link Road, Victoria Point, donated by Wally Hauser. It was established by three Lutheran congregations from Cleveland, Redland Bay and Mount Cotton. There were 63 students in Years 1 to 4 with three teachers in the school's first year, expanding to offering Years 1 to 7 by the school's third year of operation. The primary school had expected to become a feeder school to the Redeemer Lutheran College, but when that was not possible, it was decided to expand the school to also offer secondary education. Land on Beveridge Road in Thornlands was purchased and the secondary campus of the renamed Faith Lutheran College, Redlands opened on 28 January 2003. The first group of Year 12s graduated in November 2007.

Carmel College was established on 23 January 1993 by Brisbane Catholic Education, part of the Roman Catholic Archdiocese of Brisbane. It replaced Mount Carmel Catholic Secondary School College which opened in Wynnum in 1957 and closed on 31 December 1992.

Bay View State School opened in 2010. It was known as Thornlands South State School during the planning phase.

== Demographics ==
In the 2006 census, Thornlands had a population of 10,520 people, with the majority of these of working age.

In the 2011 census, Thornlands had a population of 12,807 people, 51% female and 49% male. The average age of the Thornlands population was 38 years of age, 1 year above the Australian average. 70.2% of people living in Thornlands were born in Australia. The other top responses for country of birth were England 9.2%, New Zealand 5.6%, South Africa 2.1%, Scotland 1.2%, Finland 0.6%. 91% of people spoke only English at home; the next most common languages were 0.6% Afrikaans, 0.6% Finnish, 0.4% German, 0.3% Dutch, 0.3% Italian.

In the 2016 census, Thornlands had a population of 14,694 people.

In the 2021 census, Thornlands had a population of 19,263 people.

== Education ==
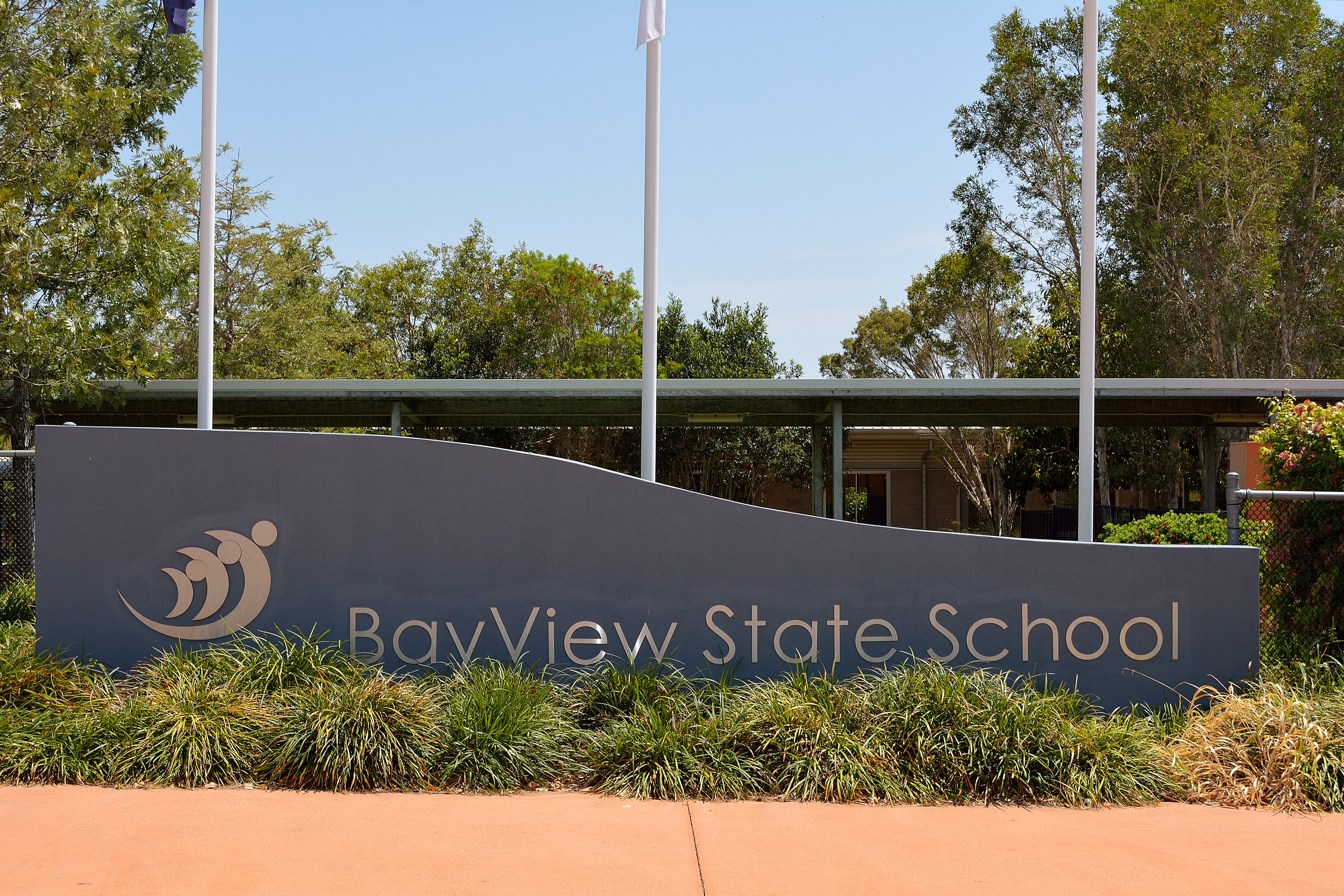
Bay View State School, 2019

Thornlands State School is a government primary (Prep-6) school for boys and girls at Panorama Drive (27.5487°S 153.2644°E). In 2017, the school had an enrolment of 741 students with 55 teachers (44 full-time equivalent) and 34 non-teaching staff (22 full-time equivalent). It includes a special education program.

Bay View State School is a government primary (Prep-6) school for boys and girls at 77 Ziegenfusz Road (27.5637°S 153.2618°E). In 2017, the school had an enrolment of 746 students with 53 teachers (49 full-time equivalent) and 30 non-teaching staff (18 full-time equivalent). It includes a special education program.

Redland District Special School is a special education primary and secondary (Early Childhood-12) school for boys and girls at 51-53 Panorama Drive (27.5501°S 153.2606°E). In 2017, the school had an enrolment of 136 students with 42 teachers (34 full-time equivalent) and 46 non-teaching staff (27 full-time equivalent).

Faith Lutheran College (Beveridge Road campus) is a private secondary (7-12) campus of Faith Lutheran College at 15 Beveridge Road (27.5764°S 153.2805°E).

Carmel College is a Catholic secondary (7-12) school for boys and girls at 20 Ziegenfusz Road (27.5653°S 153.2670°E). In 2017, the school had an enrolment of 1,124 students with 86 teachers (84 full-time equivalent) and 32 non-teaching staff (26 full-time equivalent).

There are no government secondary schools in Thornlands. The nearest government secondary schools are Cleveland District State High School in neighbouring Cleveland to the north and Victoria Point State High School in neighbouring Victoria Point to the south-east.

Nazarene Theological College is a theological college in the Wesleyan tradition at 40 Woodlands Drive. It offers tertiary education in theology, including preparation for the ministry in the Church of the Nazarene. It is open to students of other Christian denominations.

== Amenities ==
Major features of Thornlands include:

- Redlands District Rugby League Football Club
- Pinklands Netball and Pony Club
