= St James Lutheran College =

Location
- 138–172 Pantlins Lane; Hervey Bay; Urraween, Queensland, 4655; Australia
- Coordinates: 25°17′55.39″S 152°48′51.99″E

Information
- School type: Private Coeducational
- Motto: Inspired to learn – empowered to serve
- Religious affiliation: Lutheran
- Established: 2003
- Founder: St James Lutheran Church
- Principal: Luke Schoff
- Years offered: K–12
- Houses: Eli the dingoes, Wabby the birds , McKenzie the whales

St James Lutheran College is an independent, co-educational Kindergarten to Year 12 Lutheran College under the Lutheran Church of Australia. The school is located in Urraween, a suburb of Hervey Bay, South East Queensland, Australia. In 2019, St James Lutheran College had 659 students.

== See also ==
- List of schools in Queensland
