= Joan Hendriks =

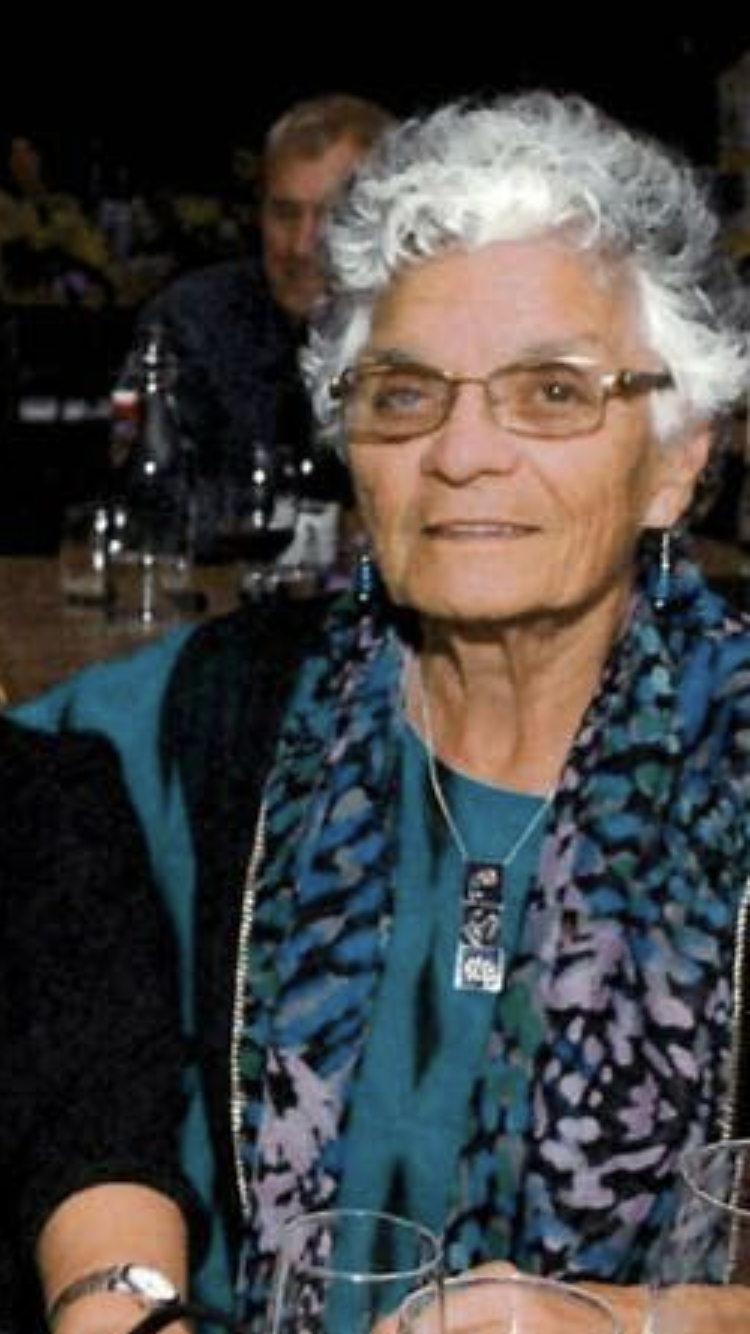
Aunty Joan Hendriks

Joan Patricia Hendriks (1936 – 26 January 2020), also known as Aunty Joan, was a Ngugi elder of one of the three groups of Quandamooka people in Moreton Island, Queensland, Australia. She is the first Indigenous person appointed to the National Catholic Education Commission, and has brought Indigenous issues to the forefront at the United Nations and International Interfaith Forums.

Hendriks is an elder at the Cleveland Murri Court. She is also a Catholic theologian and has written extensively on the conjunction of Aboriginal spirituality and Christianity.

== Biography ==
=== Early life ===
Joan Hendriks was born in 1936 in Brisbane, Queensland, and raised in the suburb of Bulimba. She is the eldest of four children, with her mother being an Aboriginal woman, and her father of Irish-American descent. Hendriks attended Saints Peter and Paul’s Catholic Primary School in Bulimba as a young girl, and in 1947 she began studying at Lourdes Hill College in Brisbane, Queensland, which she was later appointed as an elder in residence. Her mother was part of one of the first Aboriginal groups in Queensland, Australia to be moved to a mission station on Stradbroke Island, Australia. Growing up, Hendriks struggled with balancing the two different cultures of which she was a member: Christianity and Aboriginal spirituality. Alongside this, Hendriks struggled to live as a daughter of a mixed-race marriage and witnessed the segregation of her parents from the Catholic church. As an Aboriginal woman, Hendriks felt as though her early life was dominated by Western ideals and social constructs, and sought her connection to her Aboriginality through her mother and Stradbroke Island.

=== Marriage and children ===
Hendriks is married with four children.

== Education ==
Hendriks completed a degree at Griffith University in Brisbane, Australia in the 1980s. She began her PhD in Theology at age 68. In a Western society this seems late to begin studying, but in her Aboriginal culture it is appropriate as with age comes wisdom, balance and trust. She graduated in 2008 and is currently completing her doctorate at the Australian Catholic University.

== Work ==
In the past, Hendriks has presented many workshops at primary schools, secondary schools, churches, local community organisations, and universities on the borderlands between Christianity and Aboriginal spirituality. In the 1980s she worked in the field of Aboriginal Education and Reconciliation and Justice for the Indigenous peoples of Australia. In 2004 she spoke internationally at the United Nations Indigenous Peoples Forums. She has also spoken at the United Nations Interfaith Forums on Aboriginal spirituality and Christianity.

She has previously worked with Gerald Hall, a theologian and Catholic priest. He is now her mentor and friend.

She currently works at the Australian Catholic University where she is a sessional lecturer in both the Diploma in Indigenous Education and the Bachelor of Primary Education (Indigenous Studies). As a sign of respect, many people - including her students - call her Aunty Joan.

Her work remains an important aspect in her life as she uses it as a forum for discussion between Indigenous and non-Indigenous Australians without resentment or tension.

== Philosophical and/or political views ==
Hendriks was raised with a Catholic background and continues to practice Christianity. She uses her spirituality to pave the way for other Christian Aboriginal Australians and continues to teach others how to find a balance between the two, speaking of both having equal parts of her soul.

Hendriks believed in the power of acceptance and understanding to move through past experiences. She valued family greatly, stating that “ your family and where you come from creates a powerful interactive process that realizes an interconnected relationship with the great spirit of our dreaming”.

== Published works ==
Hendriks published many works alone and with others, as well as participated as a special guest in media projects. In 2006, Hendriks published Moving the Way Forward on the Australasian Catholic Record.

Collaborating with her friend and mentor Gerald Hall, Hendriks participated in Spirit of Religion: A Project for Meeting and Dialogue directed by Raimon Panikkar.

Also alongside Gerald Hall, she presented The Natural Mysticism of Indigenous Australian Traditions at a Conference on Mysticism, Fullness of Life: Homage to Raimon Panikkar in Venice, Italy

In Aunty Joan Goes to Venice, Hendriks discusses Australian Indigenous identity and faith to commemorate NAIDOC Week 2009 on ABC1.

Hendriks is also featured in episode 5 of Coast Australia: Gold Coast to Sunshine Coast which was published on the Australian History Channel in 2013.

Hendriks has also responded to Ronald Wilson’s Reconciliation: the key to the future, which was first published in 1997.

Hendriks died on 26 January 2020 at the age of 83–84.

== Honours, decorations, awards and distinctions ==
Hendriks has received many awards and distinctions throughout her life so far.

- In 2007, Hendriks received the Honorary Fellowship from the Australian Catholic University.
- In 2008, she won the Australian Catholic University’s Indigenous Research Award and Scholarship for her study A Dialogue Between Christian Theology and Indigenous Spirituality.
- In May 2012, she was awarded the Doctor of the University by the Australian Catholic University for her work in Aboriginal education and relations.
- In 2013, she was a State Finalist for Senior Australian of the Year for her work in promoting reconciliation between all Australians.
- Also in 2013, she received the Lourdes Hill College International Women’s Day Woman of the Year Award.

In addition to these awards and distinctions, Hendriks also regularly performs the Traditional Acknowledgment (of Indigenous land) at many major university functions in Queensland, Australia.

Hendriks is also a member of the Australian Catholic University Weemala Advisory Committee and the National Indigenous Advisory Committee.
