= Brisbane Catholic Education =

Educational vicariate of Brisbane

Coordinates: 27°29′39.05″S 153°01′19.35″E

Brisbane Catholic Education (BCE) is the educational Vicariate of the Roman Catholic Archdiocese of Brisbane, Queensland.

== History ==
The institution now known as Brisbane Catholic Education had its seed in the first Catholic school in the Roman Catholic Archdiocese of Brisbane, started by Mary and Michael Bourke in Elizabeth Street, Brisbane in 1845.

Schools were often independently set up by Parish priests within their own parishes, sometimes by religious institutes, either at the request of the Archbishops or the local parish priests or sometimes independently under the charism of the religious institute.

Brisbane Catholic Education has been providing Christian education in a Catholic tradition for over 150 years. As at 2017, there were 139 schools in the Brisbane Catholic Education community with the most recently opened being St Clare's Primary School in Yarrabilba.
